= List of Love Island: All Stars contestants =

The following is a list of contestants that have appeared on the ITV2 reality series Love Island: All Stars. As of the third series, 72 all star islanders have entered the villa, three of whom; Casey O'Gorman, Samie Elishi and Curtis Pritchard entered the villa twice, and six of whom appeared on the American version of the show. The youngest Love Island: All Stars islander is Tommy Bradley, who was 22 years old when he appeared on the third series, whilst Marcel Somerville, who appeared on the second series, is the oldest All Stars contestant, having been 39 years old at the time. The youngest winner is Ciaran Davies, who was 23 at the time of winning the third series, whilst Gabby Allen is the oldest winner, having been 32 when she won the second series.

== Key legend ==
Key

Winner
Runner-up
Third place
Fourth place
Fifth place
Dumped
Walked
Contestant entered for the second time
Contestant previously appeared or played on another version of the show

== Series 1–3 (2024–2026) ==
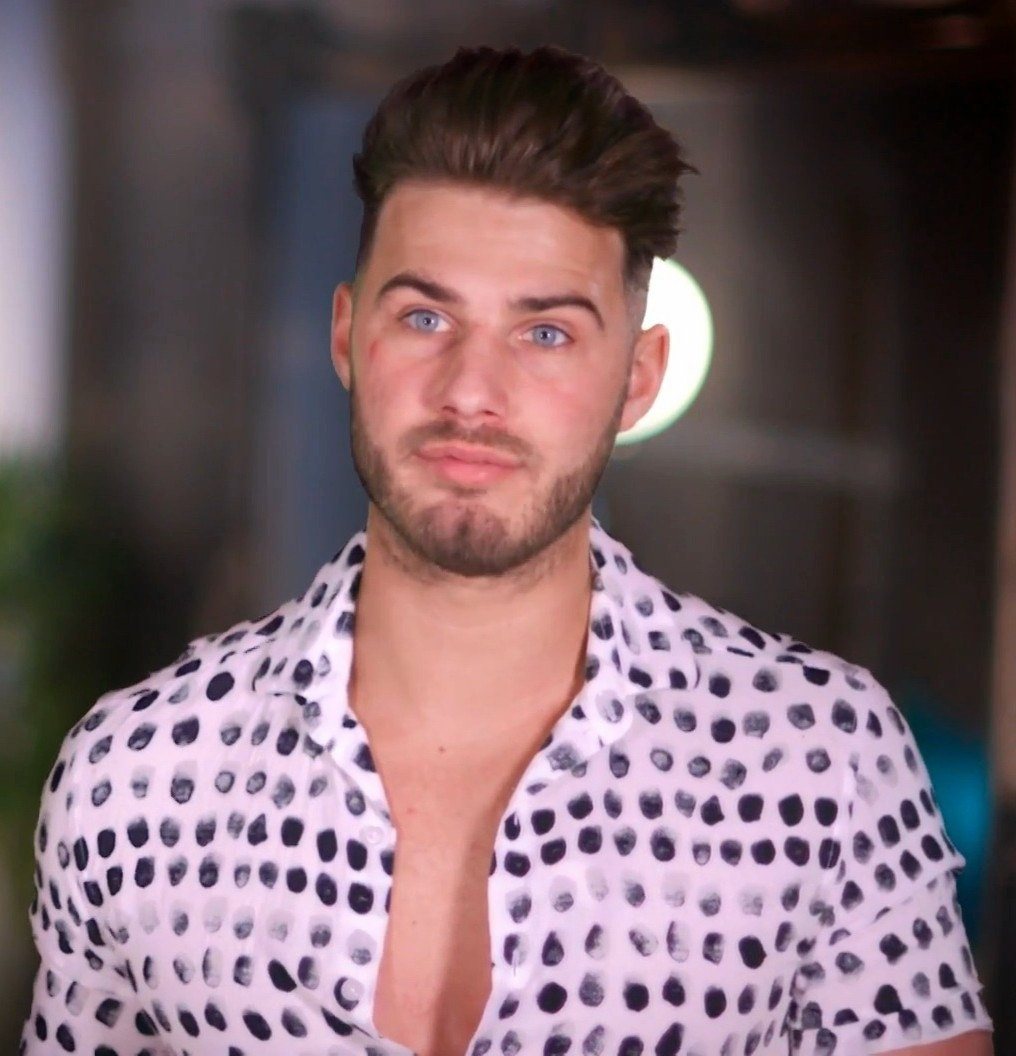
Josh Ritchie, Series 1

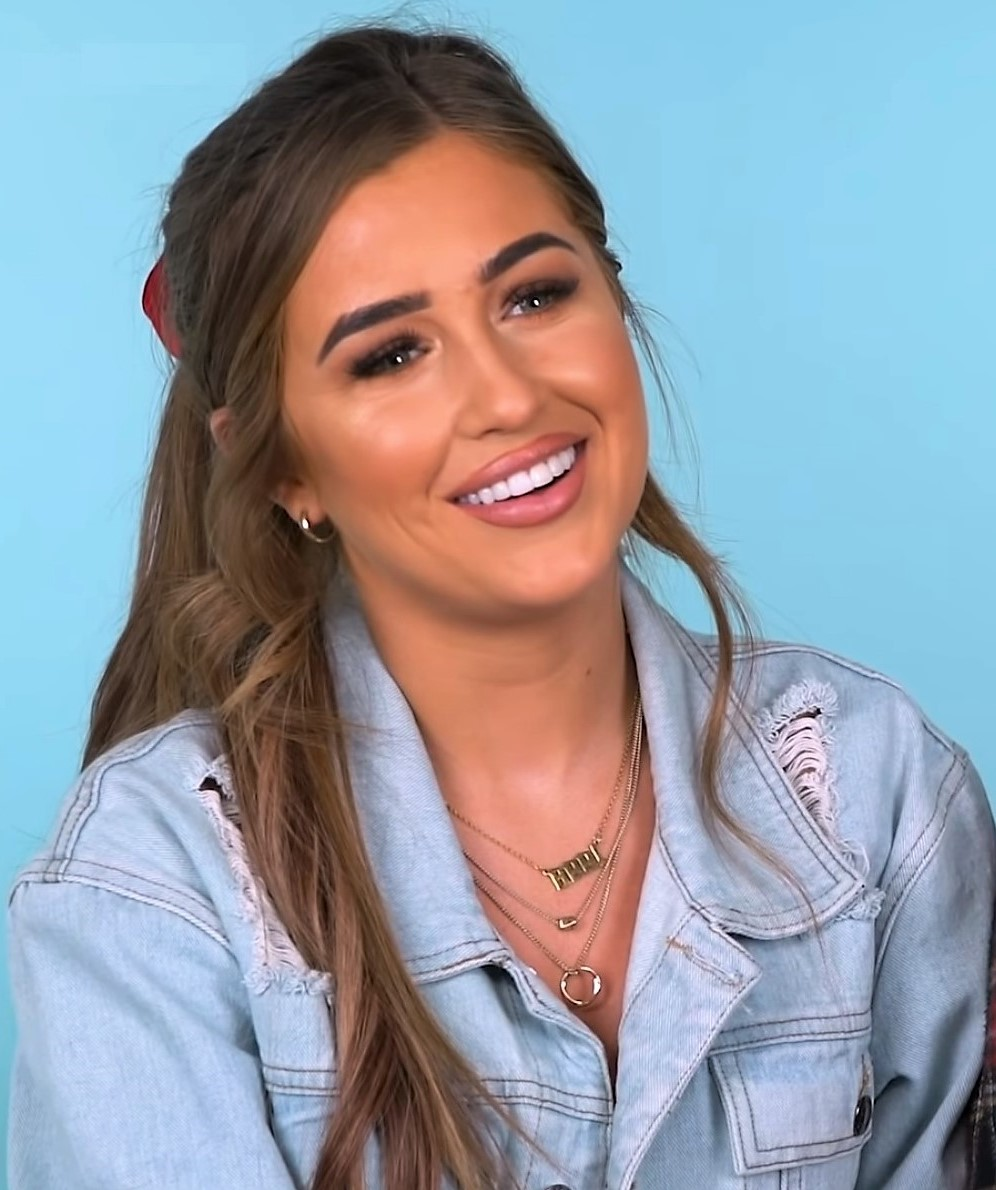
Georgia Steel, Series 1

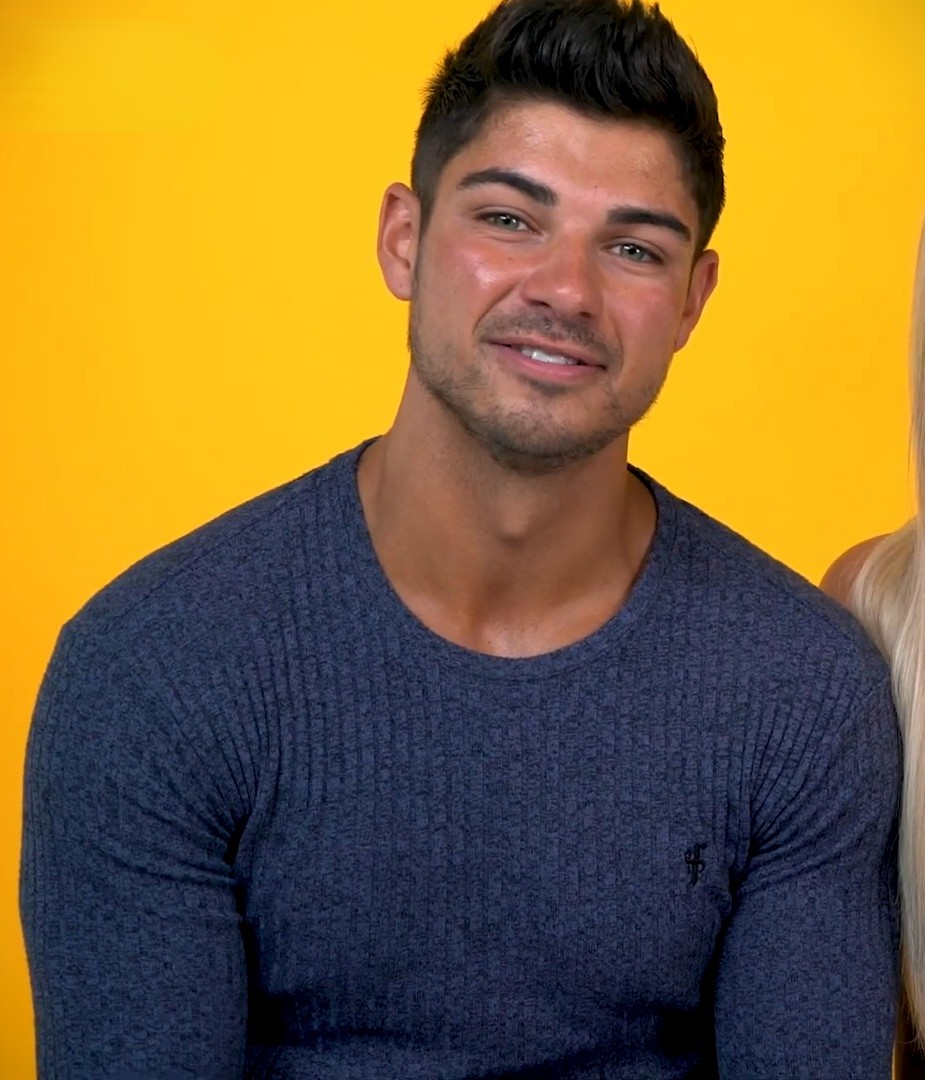
Anton Danyluk, Series 1

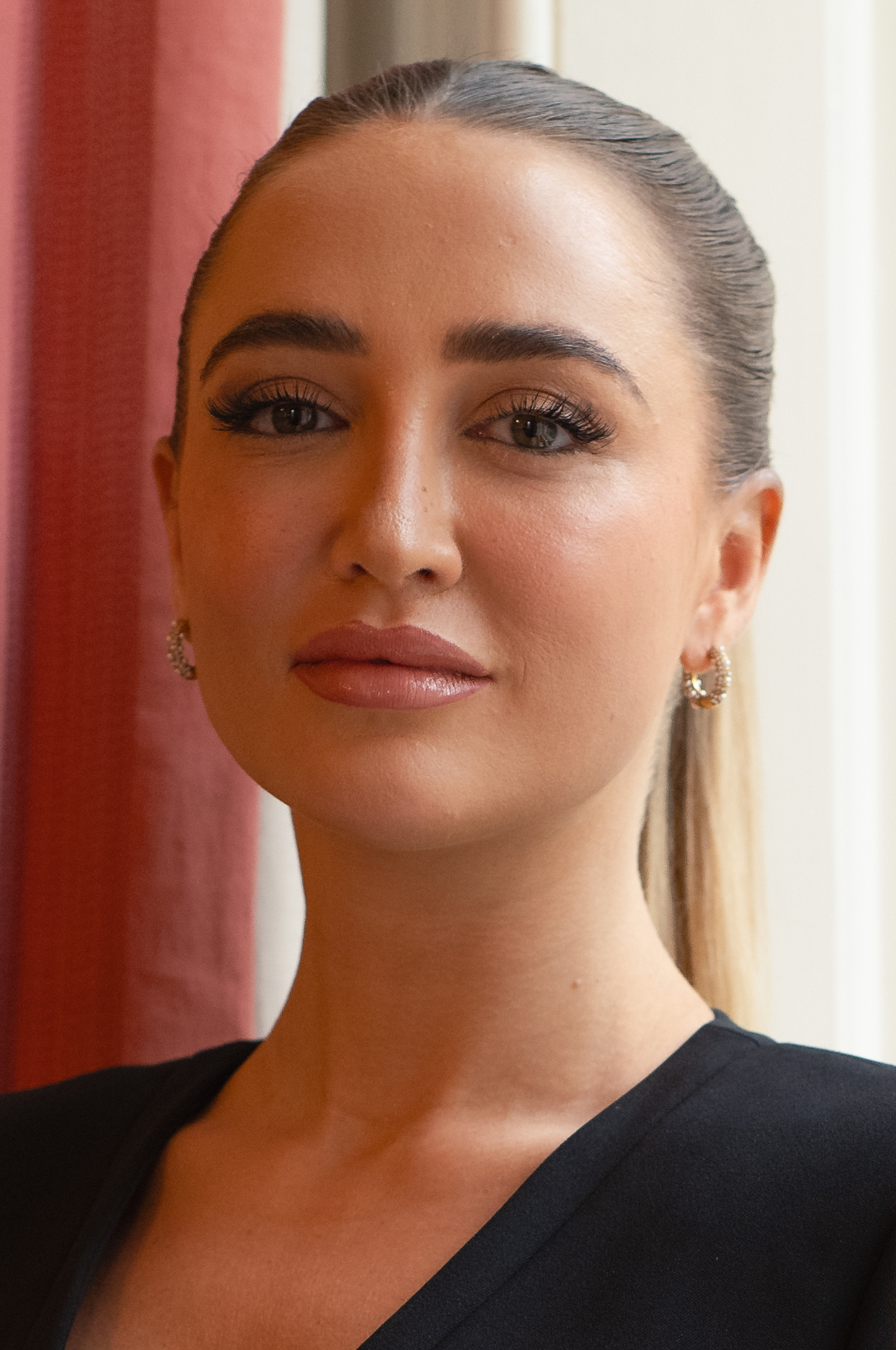
Georgia Harrison, Series 1

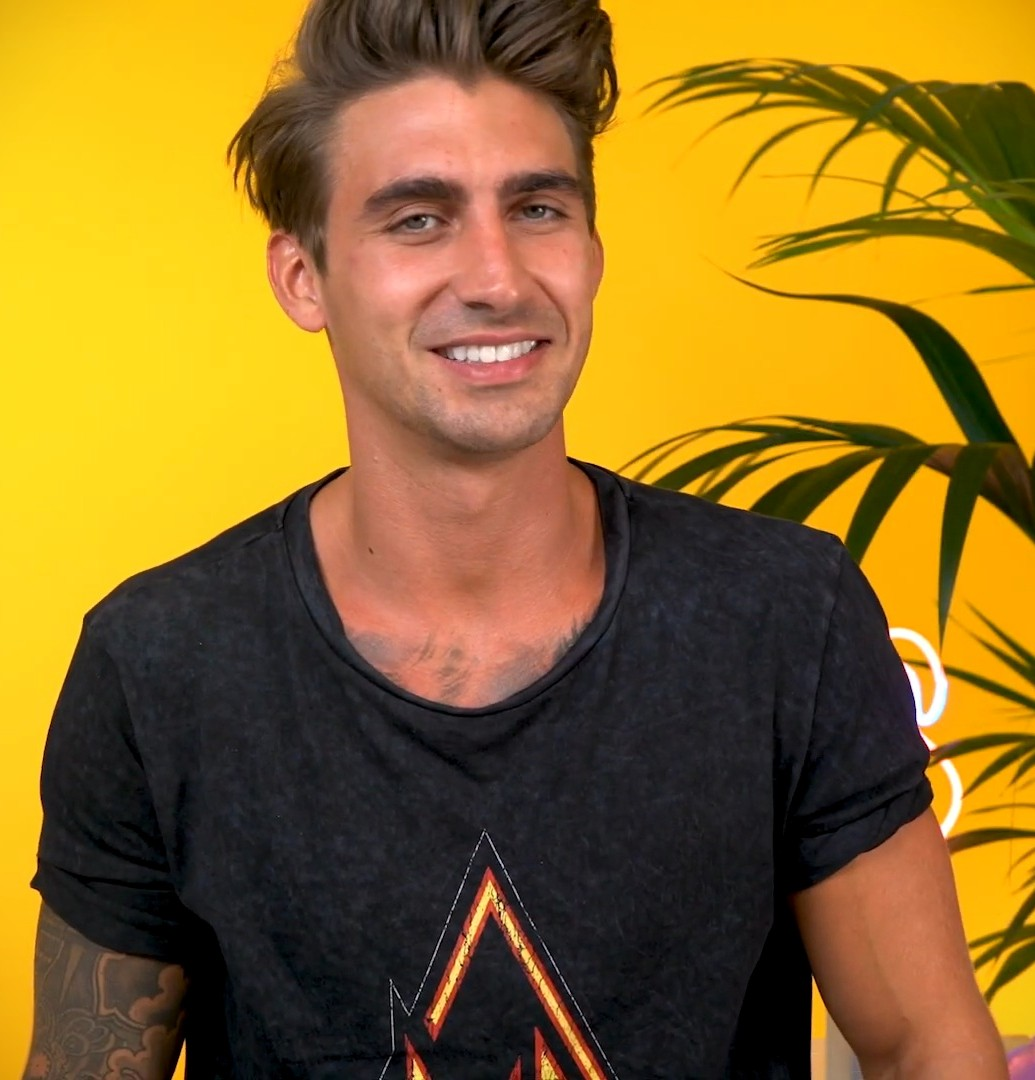
Chris Taylor, Series 1

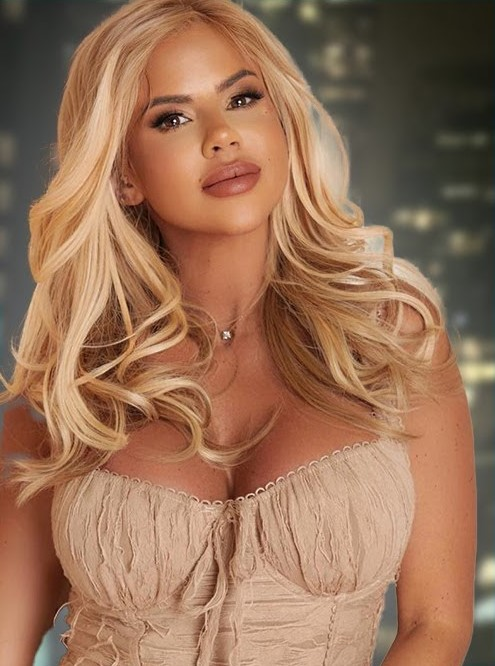
Hannah Elizabeth, Series 1

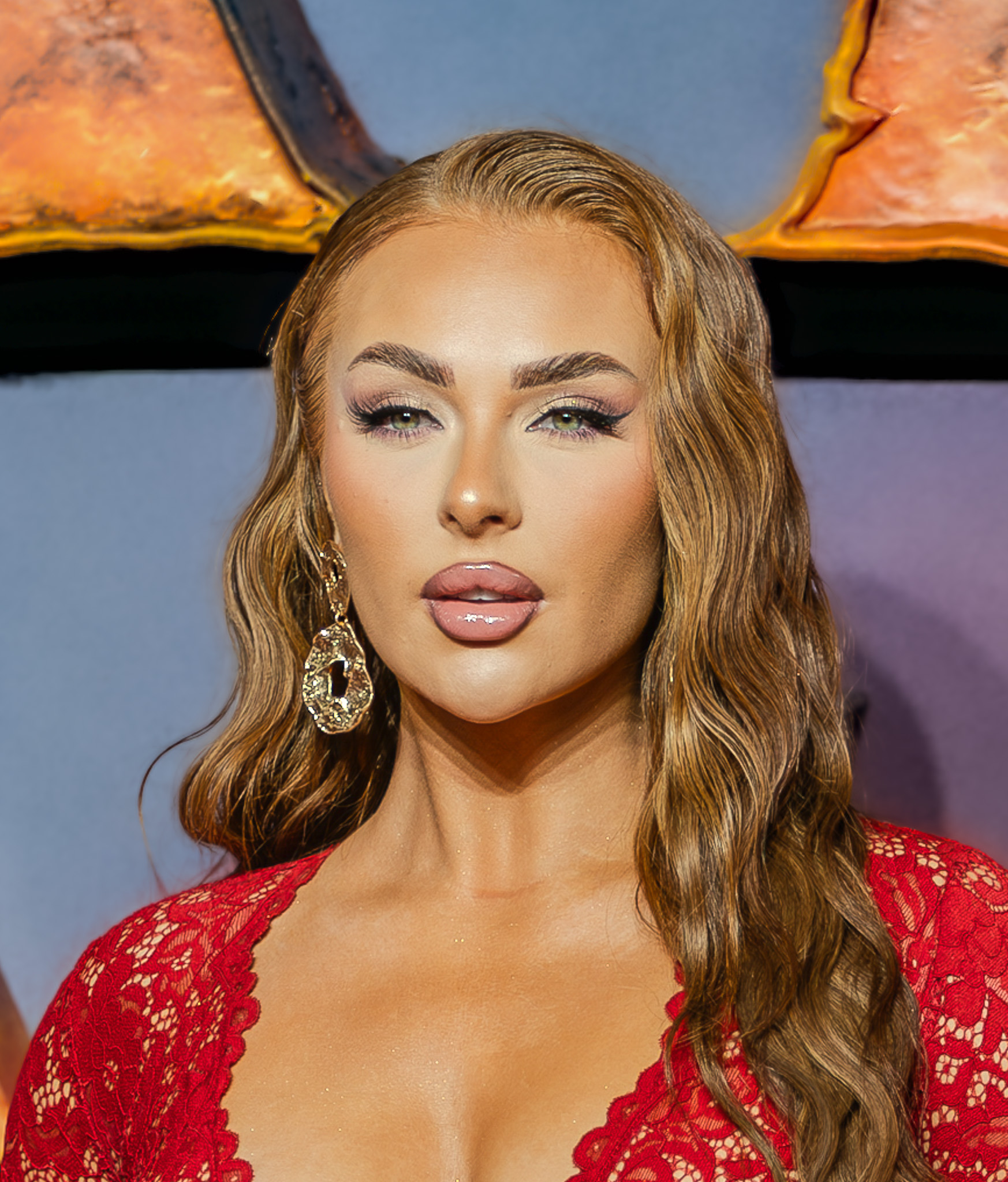
Demi Jones, Series 1

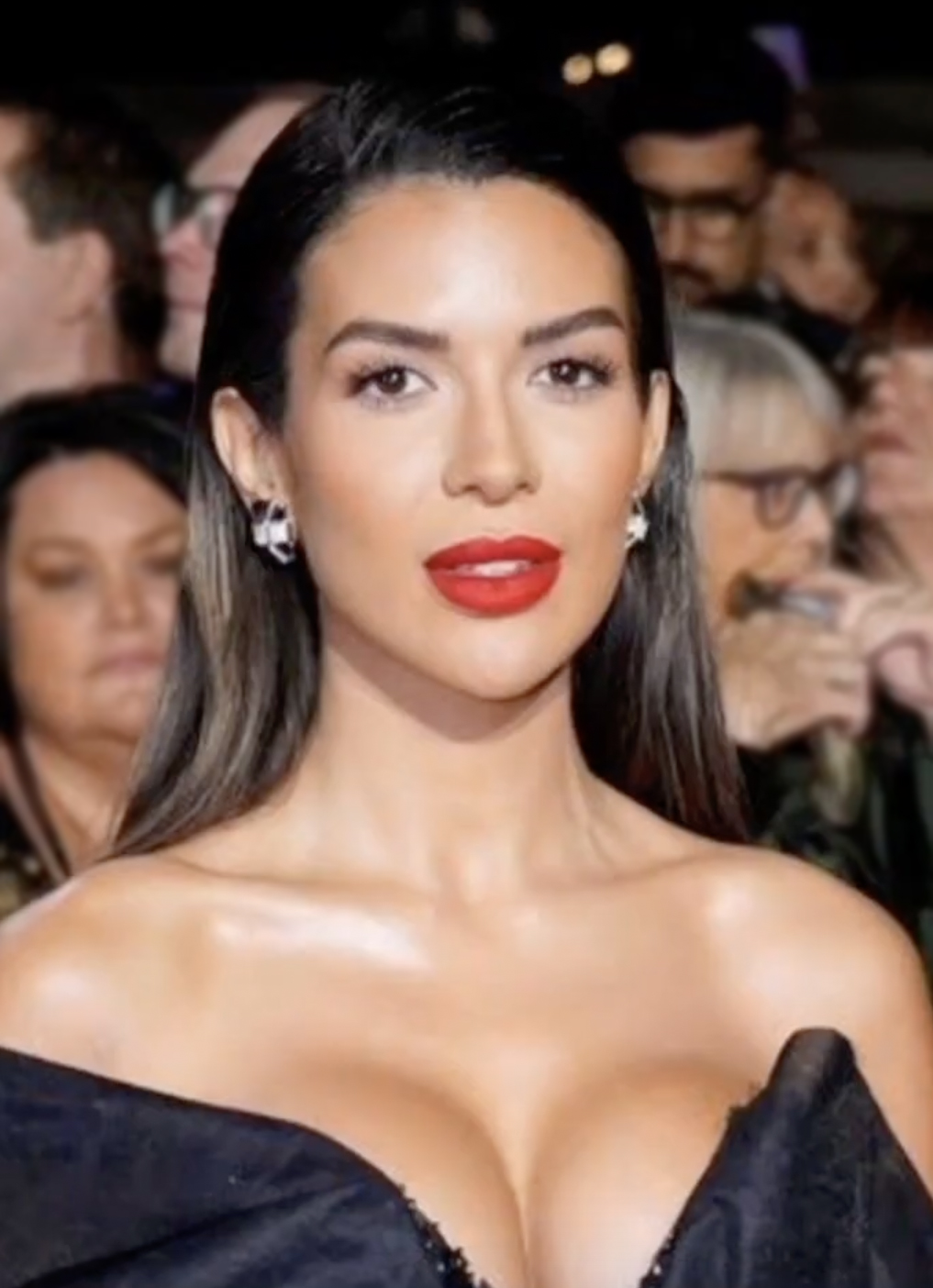
Ekin-Su Cülcüloğlu, Series 2

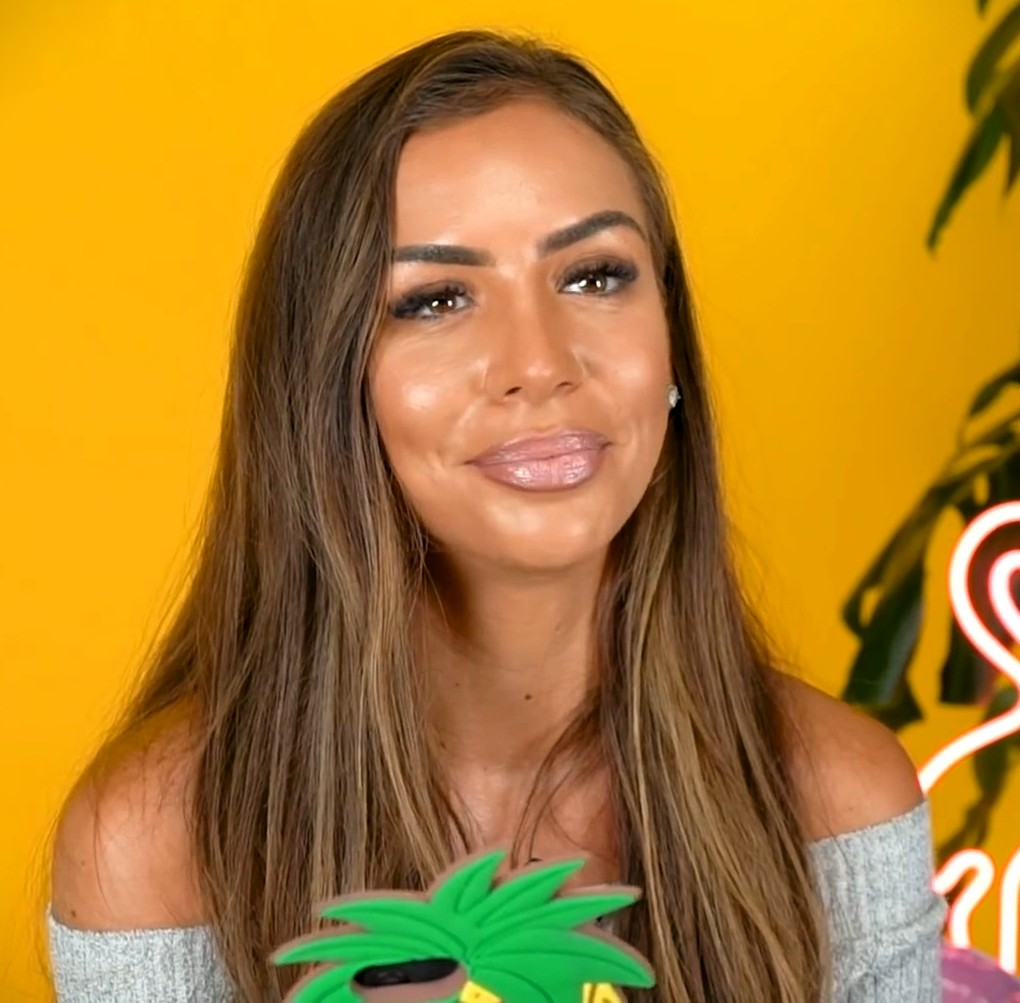
Elma Pazar, Series 2

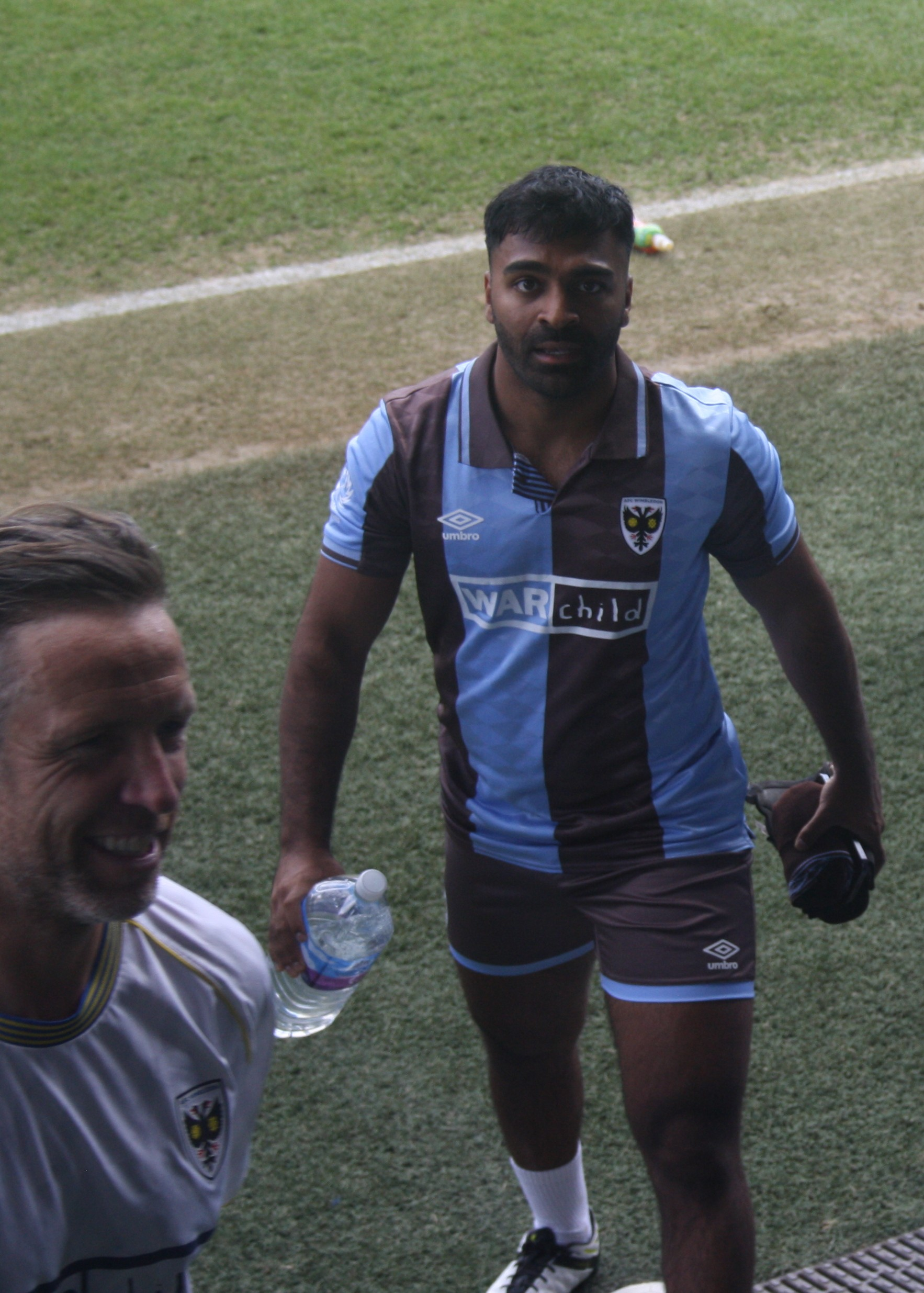
Nas Majeed, Series 2

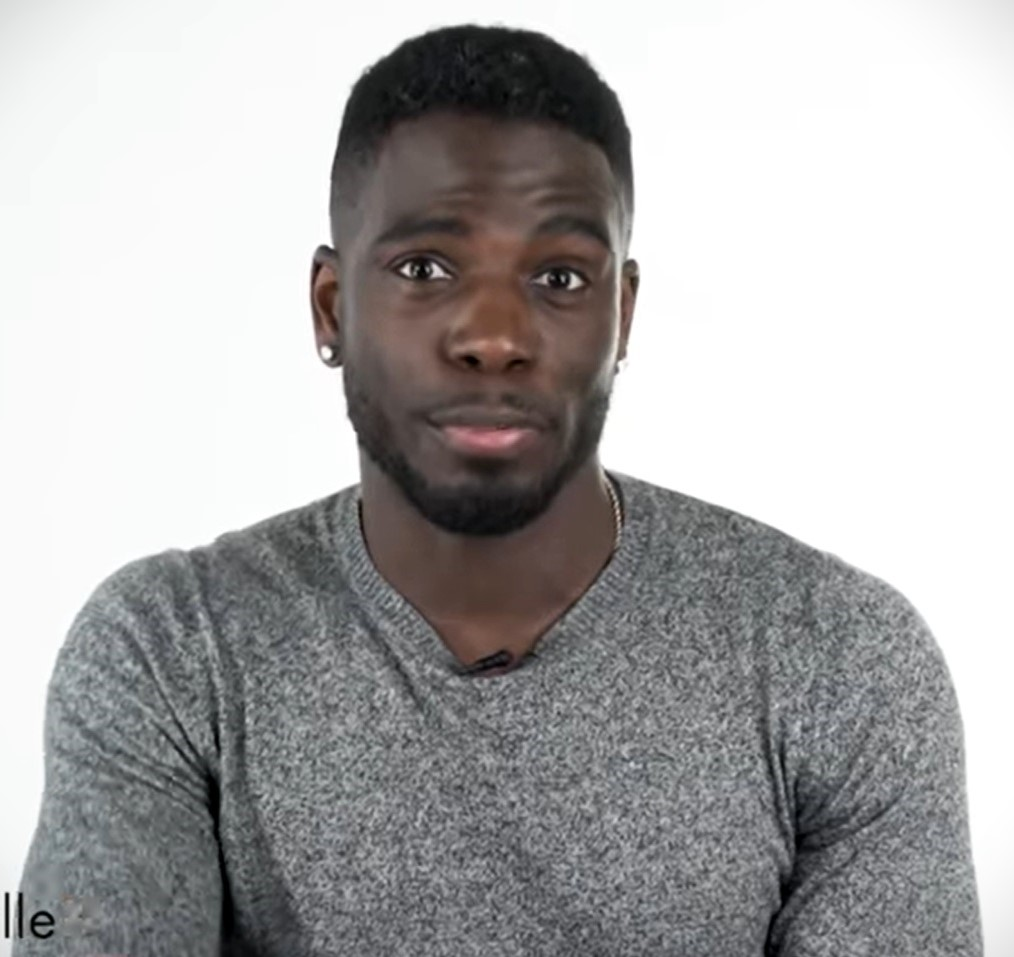
Marcel Somerville, Series 2

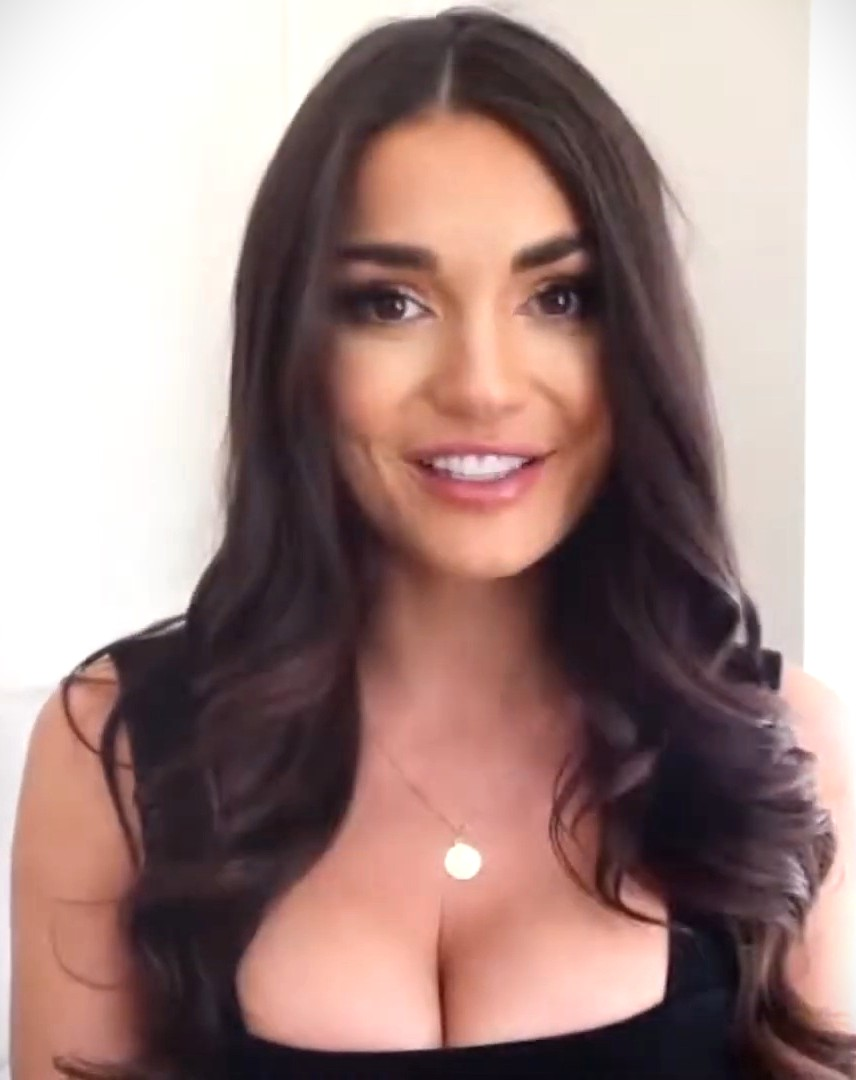
India Reynolds, Series 2

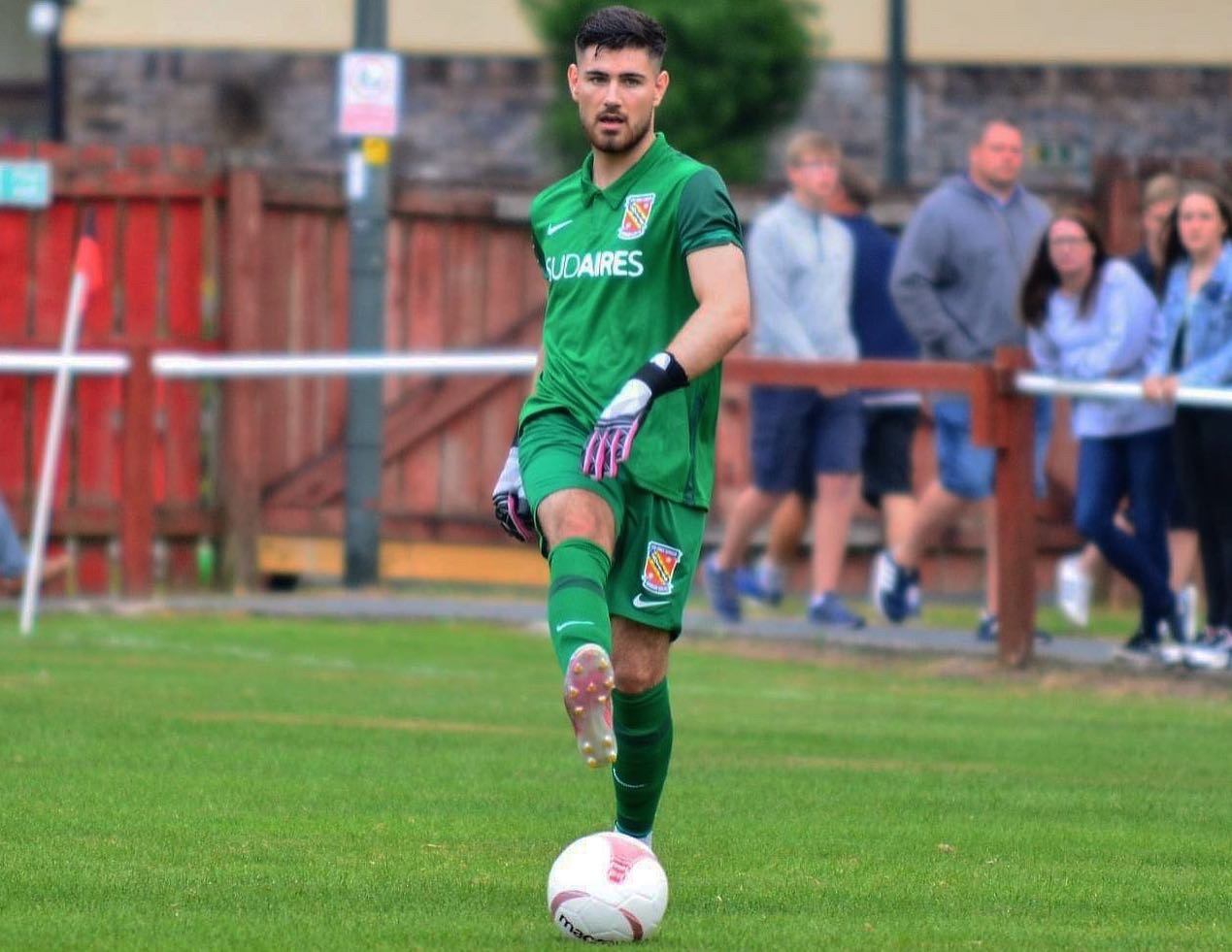
Scott van-der-Sluis, Series 3

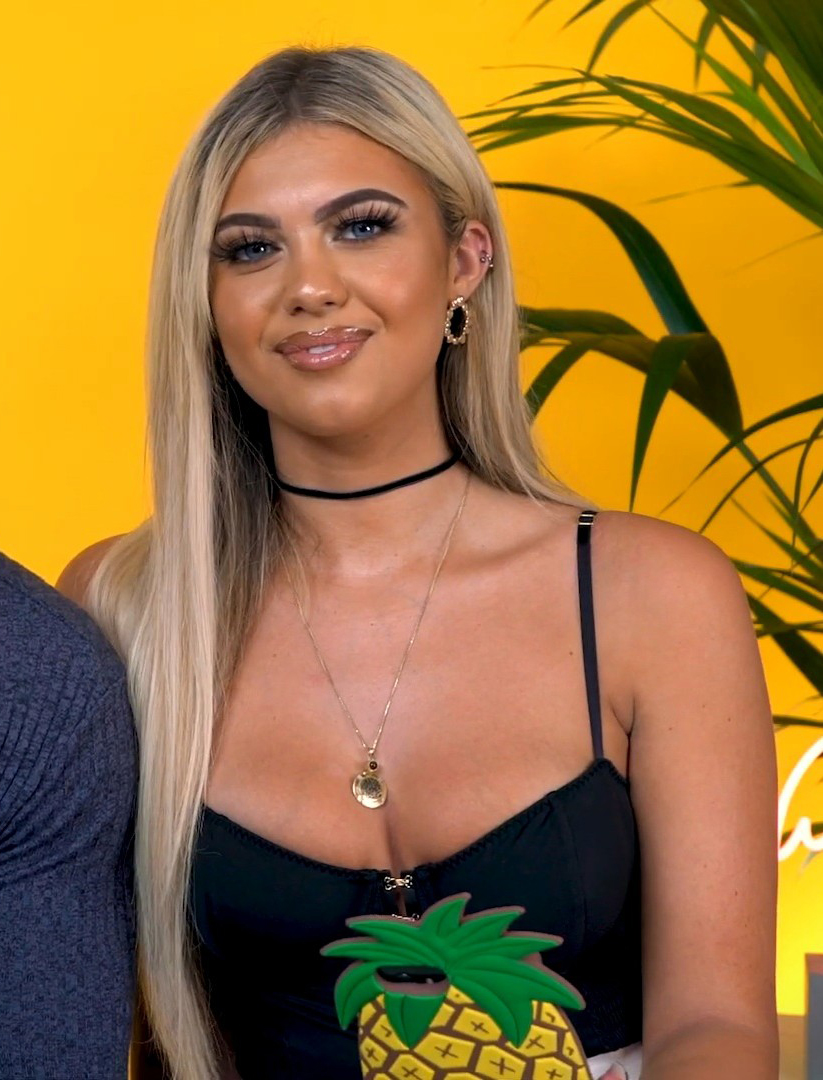
Belle Hassan, Series 3

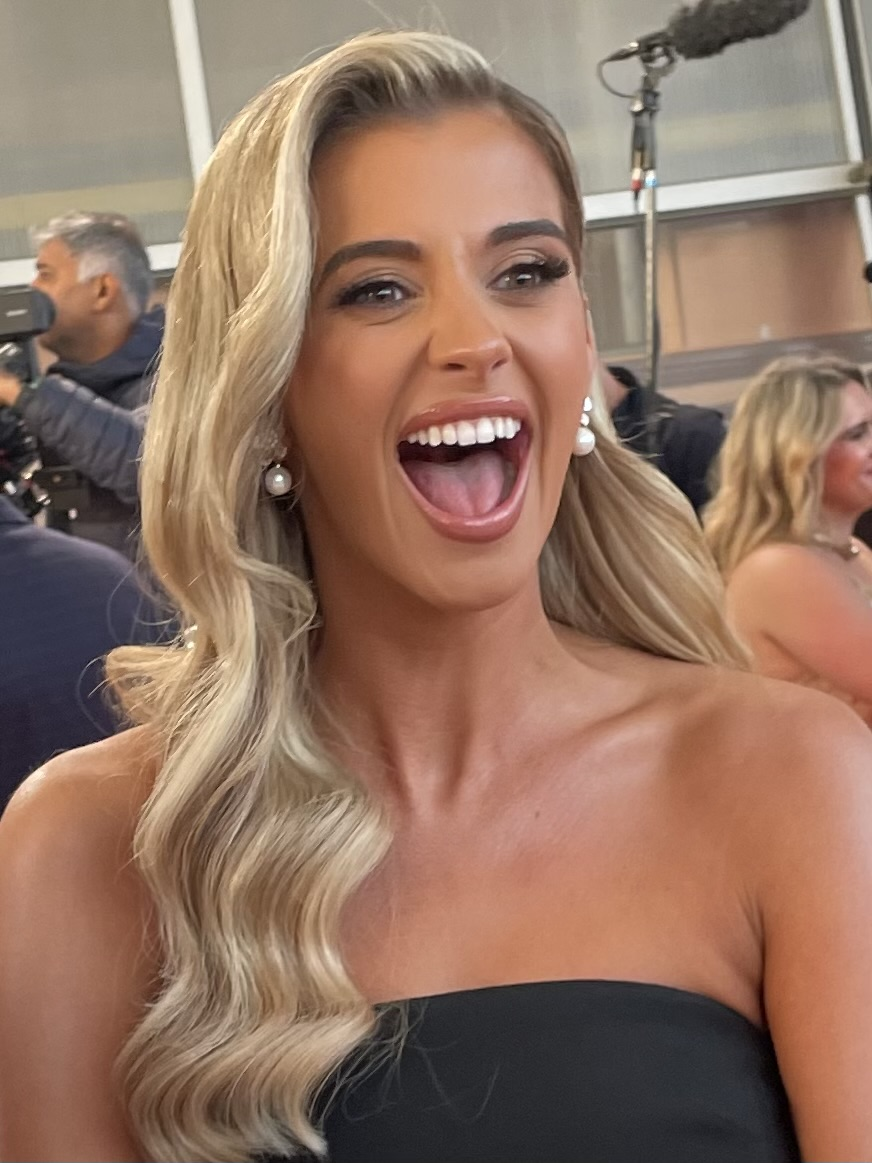
Jessy Potts, Series 3

Name	Age	Hometown	Original series(s)	Occupation	Series	Status	Ref
Molly Smith	29	Manchester	Series 6	Model	1	Winner	
Tom Clare	26	Barnsley	Series 9	Semi-professional footballer	1	Winner	
Callum Jones	27	Manchester	Series 6	Social media influencer	1	Runner-up	
Jess Gale	24	Cambridge	Series 6	Social media influencer	1	Runner-up	
Josh Ritchie	29	Bolton	Series 1	Television personality	1	Third place	
Sophie Piper	25	Essex	Series 6	Social media influencer	1	Third place	
Georgia Steel	25	York	Series 4	Social media influencer	1	Fourth place	
Georgia Steel	25	York	Games season 1	Social media influencer	1	Fourth place	
Toby Aromolaran	24	Chafford Hundred	Series 7	Semi-professional footballer and influencer	1	Fourth place	
Toby Aromolaran	24	Chafford Hundred	Games season 1	Semi-professional footballer and influencer	1	Fourth place	
Anton Danyluk	29	Airdrie	Series 5	Gym owner	1	Fifth place	
Georgia Harrison	29	Essex	Series 3	Social media influencer	1	Fifth place	
Adam Maxted	31	Belfast	Series 2	Professional wrestler	1	Dumped	
Arabella Chi	32	London	Series 5	Model	1	Dumped	
Casey O'Gorman	27	Tring	Series 9	Recruitment consultant	1	Dumped	
Eve Gale	24	Cambridge	Series 6	Social media influencer	1	Dumped	
Chris Taylor	33	Leicester	Series 5	Business development manager	1	Dumped	
Joanna Chimonides	27	London	Series 5	Recruitment consultant	1	Dumped	
Joe Garratt	27	London	Series 5	Catering company owner	1	Dumped	
Kaz Kamwi	29	Witham	Series 7	Fashion blogger	1	Dumped	
Hannah Elizabeth	33	Liverpool	Series 1	Social media influencer	1	Dumped	
Tyler Cruickshank	28	London	Series 7	Estate agent	1	Dumped	
Liberty Poole	24	Birmingham	Series 7	Social media influencer	1	Dumped	
Liberty Poole	24	Birmingham	Games season 1	Social media influencer	1	Dumped	
Mitchel Taylor	27	Sheffield	Series 10	Gas engineer	1	Dumped	
Demi Jones	25	Portsmouth	Series 6	Style advisor	1	Dumped	
Luis Morrison	29	London	Series 1	Footballer	1	Dumped	
Jake Cornish	26	Weston-super-Mare	Series 7	Water engineer	1	Walked	
Casey O'Gorman	28	Tring	Series 9	Recruitment consultant	2	Winner	
Casey O'Gorman	28	Tring	All Stars series 1	Recruitment consultant	2	Winner	
Gabby Allen	32	Liverpool	Series 3	Fitness influencer and business owner	2	Winner	
Grace Jackson	26	Manchester	Series 11	Model and business owner	2	Runner-up	
Luca Bish	25	Brighton	Series 8	Television personality	2	Runner-up	
Curtis Pritchard	28	Stoke-on-Trent	Series 5	Professional dancer	2	Third place	
Curtis Pritchard	28	Stoke-on-Trent	Games season 1	Professional dancer	2	Third place	
Ekin-Su Cülcüloğlu	30	Essex	Series 8	Actress and television personality	2	Third place	
Catherine Agbaje	24	Dublin	Series 10	Social media influencer	2	Fourth place	
Omar Nyame	26	Croydon	Series 11	Social media influencer	2	Fourth place	
Elma Pazar	32	Essex	Series 5	Television personality	2	Fifth place	
Sammy Root	23	Dartford	Series 10	Project manager	2	Fifth place	
Harriett Blackmore	24	Brighton	Series 11	Social media influencer	2	Dumped	
Ronnie Vint	28	London	Series 11	Semi-professional footballer	2	Dumped	
Chuggs Wallis	26	Weybridge	Series 7	Business owner	2	Dumped	
Tina Stinnes	29	London	Series 2	Television personality	2	Dumped	
Danielle Sellers	29	Hastings	Series 3	Social media influencer	2	Dumped	
Samie Elishi	24	London	Series 9	Social media influencer	2	Dumped	
Ron Hall	27	Essex	Series 9	Financial advisor	2	Walked	
Scott Thomas	36	Salford	Series 2	Television personality	2	Walked	
Kaz Crossley	29	London	Series 4	Model	2	Dumped	
Montel McKenzie	27	London	Series 10	Semi-professional footballer	2	Dumped	
Nas Majeed	28	London	Series 6	Content creator and presenter	2	Dumped	
Marcel Somerville	39	London	Series 3	Performer and DJ	2	Dumped	
Olivia Hawkins	29	Essex	Series 9	Social media influencer and actress	2	Dumped	
India Reynolds	34	Reading	Series 5	Model	2	Dumped	
Ciaran Davies	23	Pencoed	Series 11	Rugby player and social media influencer	3	Winner	
Samie Elishi	25	London	Series 9	Social media influencer	3	Winner	
Samie Elishi	25	London	All Stars series 2	Social media influencer	3	Winner	
Millie Court	29	Romford	Series 7	Social media influencer	3	Runner-up	
Zac Woodworth	26	Portland, U.S.	USA season 7	Entrepreneur	3	Runner-up	
Leanne Amaning	28	London	Series 6	Social media influencer	3	Third place	
Scott van-der-Sluis	25	Connah's Quay	Series 10	Social media influencer and footballer	3	Third place	
Scott van-der-Sluis	25	Connah's Quay	USA season 5	Social media influencer and footballer	3	Third place	
Scott van-der-Sluis	25	Connah's Quay	Games season 1	Social media influencer and footballer	3	Third place	
Lucinda Strafford	26	Ditchling	Series 7	Social media influencer	3	Fourth place	
Lucinda Strafford	26	Ditchling	Australia season 5	Social media influencer	3	Fourth place	
Lucinda Strafford	26	Ditchling	Games season 2	Social media influencer	3	Fourth place	
Sean Stone	26	Hertford	Series 11	Sweet salesman	3	Fourth place	
Whitney Adebayo	28	Camden	Series 10	Wig company owner and social media influencer	3	Fifth place	
Yamen Sanders	31	Inglewood, U.S.	USA season 1	Athlete and influencer	3	Fifth place	
Belle Hassan	27	Bromley	Series 5	Social media influencer and make-up artist	3	Dumped	
Harrison Solomon	23	Derby	Series 12	Social media influencer	3	Dumped	
Jessy Potts	26	Leicester	Series 11	Social media influencer	3	Dumped	
Tommy Bradley	22	Hertfordshire	Series 12	Landscape gardener and social media influencer	3	Dumped	
Carrington Rodriguez	28	Salt Lake City, U.S.	USA season 2	TV personality	3	Dumped	
Carrington Rodriguez	28	Salt Lake City, U.S.	Games season 1	TV personality	3	Dumped	
Helena Ford	29	London	Series 12	Social media influencer	3	Dumped	
Jack Keating	26	Dublin	Series 8	Radio presenter	3	Dumped	
Sheribel "Sher" Suarez	27	Orlando, U.S.	USA season 2	TV personality	3	Dumped	
Curtis Pritchard	28	Stoke-on-Trent	Series 5	Professional dancer	3	Dumped	
Curtis Pritchard	28	Stoke-on-Trent	Games season 1	Professional dancer	3	Dumped	
Curtis Pritchard	28	Stoke-on-Trent	All Stars series 2	Professional dancer	3	Dumped	
Imani Ayan Wheeler	24	Sacramento, U.S.	USA season 5	Business woman	3	Dumped	
Imani Ayan Wheeler	24	Sacramento, U.S.	Games season 1	Business woman	3	Dumped	
Konnor Ewudzi	30	Cornwall	Series 11	Barber	3	Dumped	
Kyra Lizama	28	Honolulu, U.S.	USA season 3	TV personality	3	Dumped	
Jess Harding	25	Uxbridge	Series 10	Aesthetics practitioner and social media influencer	3	Dumped	
Shaq Muhammad	27	London	Series 9	Personal trainer	3	Dumped	
Andrea-Jane "AJ" Bunker	33	Dunstable	Series 7	Hair extension technician	3	Dumped	
Charlie Frederick	31	Plymouth	Series 4	Model and fitness influencer	3	Dumped	

== Post filming ==
Season	Islanders	Still Together?	Status	Ref
All Stars 1	Molly Smith; Tom Clare	Yes	Smith and Clare got married in July 2026.	
All Stars 1	Callum Jones; Jess Gale	No	Jones and Gale split in April 2024.	
All Stars 1	Josh Ritchie; Sophie Piper	Yes	Ritchie and Piper are still together as of November 2026.	
All Stars 1	Georgia Steel; Toby Aromolaran	No	Steel and Aromolaran split in March 2024.	
All Stars 1	Anton Danyluk; Georgia Harrison	No	Danyluk and Harrison split in May 2024.	
All Stars 1	Adam Maxted; Arabella Chi	No	Maxted and Chi split in March 2024.	
All Stars 2	Casey O'Gorman; Gabby Allen	No	O'Gorman and Allen split in May 2025.	
All Stars 2	Grace Jackson; Luca Bish	Yes	Jackson and Bish are still together as of November 2026.	
All Stars 2	Curtis Pritchard; Ekin-Su Cülcüloğlu	No	Pritchard and Cülcüloğlu split in May 2025.	
All Stars 2	Catherine Agbaje; Omar Nyame	No	Agbaje and Nyame split in April 2025.	
All Stars 2	Elma Pazar; Sammy Root	No	Pazar and Root split in June 2025.	
All Stars 3	Ciaran Davies; Samie Elishi	No	Davies and Elishi split in March 2026.	
All Stars 3	Millie Court; Zac Woodworth	No	Court and Woodworth split in May 2026.	
All Stars 3	Leanne Amaning; Scott van-der-Sluis	Yes	Amaning and van-der-Sluis are still together as of November 2026.	
All Stars 3	Lucinda Strafford; Sean Stone	Yes	Strafford and Stone are still together as of November 2026.	
All Stars 3	Whitney Adebayo; Yamen Sanders	No	Adebayo and Sanders split in May 2026.	
All Stars 3	Belle Hassan; Harrison Solomon	No	Hassan and Solomon split in April 2026.	
All Stars 3	Carrington Rodriguez; Helena Ford	No	Rodriguez and Ford split in April 2026.	
All Stars 3	Jack Keating; Sher Suarez	No	Keating and Suarez split in June 2026.	
