= Longhill High School =

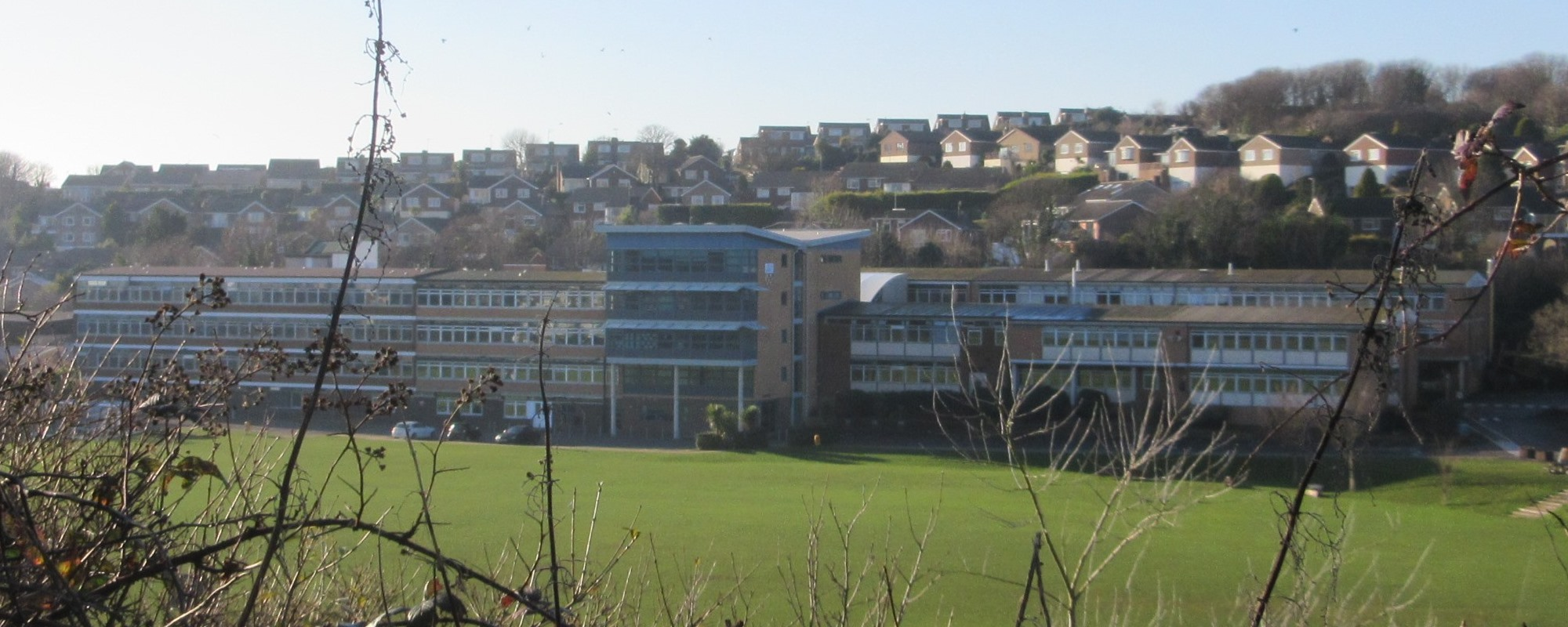

Location
- Falmer Road; Rottingdean, East Sussex, BN2 7FR; England, United Kingdom; 50.8184°N 0.0676°W

Information
- Type: Community school
- Local authority: Brighton and Hove
- Department for Education URN: 114581 Tables
- Ofsted: Reports
- Gender: Mixed
- Age: 11 to 16
- Enrolment: 892
- Website: http://www.longhill.brighton-hove.sch.uk/

Longhill High School is a co-educational secondary school for 11 to 16 year-olds, which is located in Rottingdean, Brighton and Hove, East Sussex. The school grounds are served by Brighton & Hove bus routes 2, 22, 72, 72A and 76, 76A.

== History ==
The school was officially opened in 1964, although took its first intake in 1963. The school originally had six houses named after castles in Sussex: Arundel, Bramber, Chichester, Hastings, Lewes and Pevensey.

On 16 September 2010, officially it opened its new block, named "Vaughan Block" after one of the longest-serving teachers, after a campaign on the social networking site Facebook.

On the hottest day thus far in 2016, several dozen male pupils were excluded from lessons due to wearing school PE shorts instead of trousers. The head teacher said, “Students have access to water in order to keep themselves hydrated" and stated that only around 2 per cent of pupils were involved. Over the next few days, more than a dozen male pupils attended school wearing school uniform skirts instead as a protest, which they were permitted to do after initially being told to remove them. Parents said that the protest should encourage the school to consider changing its uniform policy.

In 2018 the school implemented a new house system named after local landmarks: Brighton Dome, Brighton Lanes, Brighton Pavilion and Brighton Pier. It also changed its motto to “Aspiration, Determination, Success”.

== Initiatives and projects ==
Longhill High School is involved in projects.

- Shortlisted for Learning through Landscapes' Fruit-ful Schools project.
- Pupils are part of the Young Gifted and Talented Programme.
- Pupils are part of the Aim Higher scheme.

== Notable students ==
- John Volanthen, one of the divers in the Tham Luang cave rescue in Thailand.
- Tommy Elphick, a professional football player.
- Saffron Barker, a YouTube vlogger, who was a contestant in Strictly Come Dancing in 2019.
- Fabienne André, British paraathlete.
- Sonay Kartal, tennis player
- Harriet Blackmore, Reality TV Star, who was a contestant in Love Island Series 11 and Love Island: All Stars series 2.
