= Harriett Blackmore =

English television personality and model (born 2000)

- Born: Harriett Mae Blackmore; 4 May 2000 (age 26); Brighton, East Sussex, England
- Occupation: Television personality
- Years active: 2024–present
- Known for: Love Island; Love Island: All Stars

Harriett Mae Blackmore (born 4 May 2000) is an English television personality, known for appearing as a contestant on the eleventh series of the ITV2 dating show Love Island in 2024 and the second series of Love Island: All Stars in 2025.

== Life and career ==
Harriett Mae Blackmore was born on 4 May 2000 in Brighton, East Sussex. Prior to appearing on television, she worked as a dancer and as a personal shopper, including for rapper ArrDee. She is also close friends with social media influencer Saffron Barker. In June 2024, Blackmore entered the Love Island villa to appear as a contestant on the eleventh series of the ITV2 reality show. She entered the villa as an original contestant on Day 1. During her time in the villa, she was coupled up with Ciaran Davies, Sean Stone and Ronnie Vint. She was dumped alongside the latter on Day 26 of the series, after receiving the fewest votes to save from the public. In January 2025, it was announced that Blackmore would return to Love Island, six months after her original appearance, to appear as a contestant on the second series of Love Island: All Stars. She entered the villa as a "bombshell".

== Filmography ==
As herself
Year	Title	Notes	Ref.
2024	Love Island	Contestant; series 11	
2025	Love Island: All Stars	Contestant; series 2	
