= Tina Stinnes =

English television personality (born 1995)

- Born: Christiane Anna Johanna Stinnes; 25 February 1995 (age 31); Slough, Buckinghamshire, England
- Occupation: Television personality
- Years active: 2014–present
- Known for: Made in Chelsea; Love Island; Love Island: All Stars

Christiane Anna Johanna Stinnes (born 25 February 1995) is an English television personality. She appeared in the E4 reality series Made in Chelsea in 2014 and 2017 respectively, before joining as a regular cast member in 2024. In 2016, she appeared on the second series of the ITV2 reality series Love Island, and later returned to compete in the spin-off series Love Island: All Stars in 2025.

== Life and career ==
Christiane Anna Johanna Stinnes was born on 25 February 1995 in Slough, Buckinghamshire. She later relocated to London and prior to her television career was a business student. In 2014, she appeared in seventh series of the E4 reality series Made in Chelsea. In 2016, Stinnes appeared as a contestant on the second series of the ITV2 reality series Love Island. She entered the villa as a "bombshell" on Day 20, and was coupled up with Troy Frith and Adam Maxted respectively during the series. She was dumped from the villa on Day 40, after being left single during the recoupling. In 2017, Stinnes returned in Made in Chelsea for the thirteenth series. She made a permanent return to the show in 2024, appearing as a regular cast member from the twenty-seventh series onwards. In January 2025, Stinnes returned to Love Island to appear as a contestant on the second series of Love Island: All Stars. She ppeared as a guest on the first episode of Vanderpump Villa series 3.

== Filmography ==
As herself
Year	Title	Role	Ref.
2014, 2017, 2024–present	Made in Chelsea	Main role	
2016	Love Island	Contestant; series 2	
2025	Love Island: All Stars	Contestant; series 2	
2026	Vanderpump villa	Guest series 3	
