= Ron Hall (TV personality) =

English television personality (born 1997)

- Born: Ronald Arthur Hall; 20 August 1997 (age 28); Waltham Forest, East London, England
- Occupation: Television personality
- Years active: 2023–present
- Known for: Love Island; Love Island: All Stars

Ronald Arthur Hall (born 20 August 1997) is an English television personality. In 2023, he was runner-up of the ninth series of the ITV2 dating series Love Island, and subsequently returned to appear on the second series of Love Island: All Stars in 2025.

== Life and career ==
Ronald Arthur Hall was born on 20 August 1997 in Waltham Forest, Essex. Hall is partially sighted, having lost sight in his right eye following an injury sustained whilst playing football as a child. Prior to appearing on television, he worked as a financial advisor. In January 2023, Hall became a contestant on the ninth series of the ITV2 reality series Love Island. He was the first blind contestant to appear on the series. After entering the villa on the first day, he was coupled up with Lana Jenkins and Tanyel Rivan during the series, ultimately reaching the final with the former. Hall and Jenkins finished as the runners-up with 30.08% of the vote, behind Kai Fagan and Sanam Harrinanan. Following his appearance on the show, he became an ambassador for the Royal National Institute of Blind People. In January 2025, it was announced that Hall would return to Love Island, two years after his original appearance, to appear as a contestant on the second series of Love Island: All Stars. He entered the villa as a "bombshell" on Day 8 of the series.

== Filmography ==
As himself
Year	Title	Notes	Ref.
2023	Love Island	Contestant; series 9	
2025	Love Island: All Stars	Contestant; series 2	
