= Chuggs Wallis =

English television personality (born 1998)

- Born: Oliver George Lee Wallis; 30 March 1998 (age 28); Weybridge, Surrey, England
- Occupations: Television personality, entrepreneur
- Years active: 2021–present
- Known for: Love Island; Love Island: All Stars

Oliver George Lee "Chuggs" Wallis (born 30 March 1998) is an English television personality, known for appearing as a contestant on the seventh series of the ITV2 dating show Love Island in 2021 and the second series of Love Island: All Stars in 2025. Made in Chelsea Season 30 onwards.

== Life and career ==
Oliver George Lee Wallis was born on 30 March 1998 in Weybridge, Surrey. He is now known as ‘Chuggs’, this is a childhood nickname given by his mum meaning ‘cuddles and hugs’. Prior to appearing on television, In 2019, Wallis founded the clothing brand Booby, a British lifestyle and custom apparel company specialising in university and sports team merchandise. The brand initially gained media attention during his appearance on Love Island and has since expanded its product range and collaborations. In May 2019, Wallis appeared in an episode of the E4 reality series Made in Chelsea during a speed dating night. In June 2021, he became a contestant on the seventh series of the ITV2 reality series Love Island. He entered the villa as a bombshell on Day 4 alongside Liam Reardon. The following day, he was left single at the recoupling and was ultimately dumped from island on Day 6 after not being chosen by bombshell, Rachel Finni. Wallis has been noted in British media for his distinctive nickname and entrepreneurial background prior to appearing on Love Island. In February 2025, it was announced that Wallis would return to Love Island, four years after his original appearance, to appear as a contestant on the second series of Love Island: All Stars. He again entered the villa as a bombshell on Day 22 of the series alongside Samie Elishi.

== Filmography ==
As herself
Year	Title	Notes	Ref.
2019-Present	Made in Chelsea	24 episodes	
2021	Love Island	Contestant; series 7	
2025	Love Island: All Stars	Contestant; series 2	
