= Nas Majeed =

English television personality (born 1996)

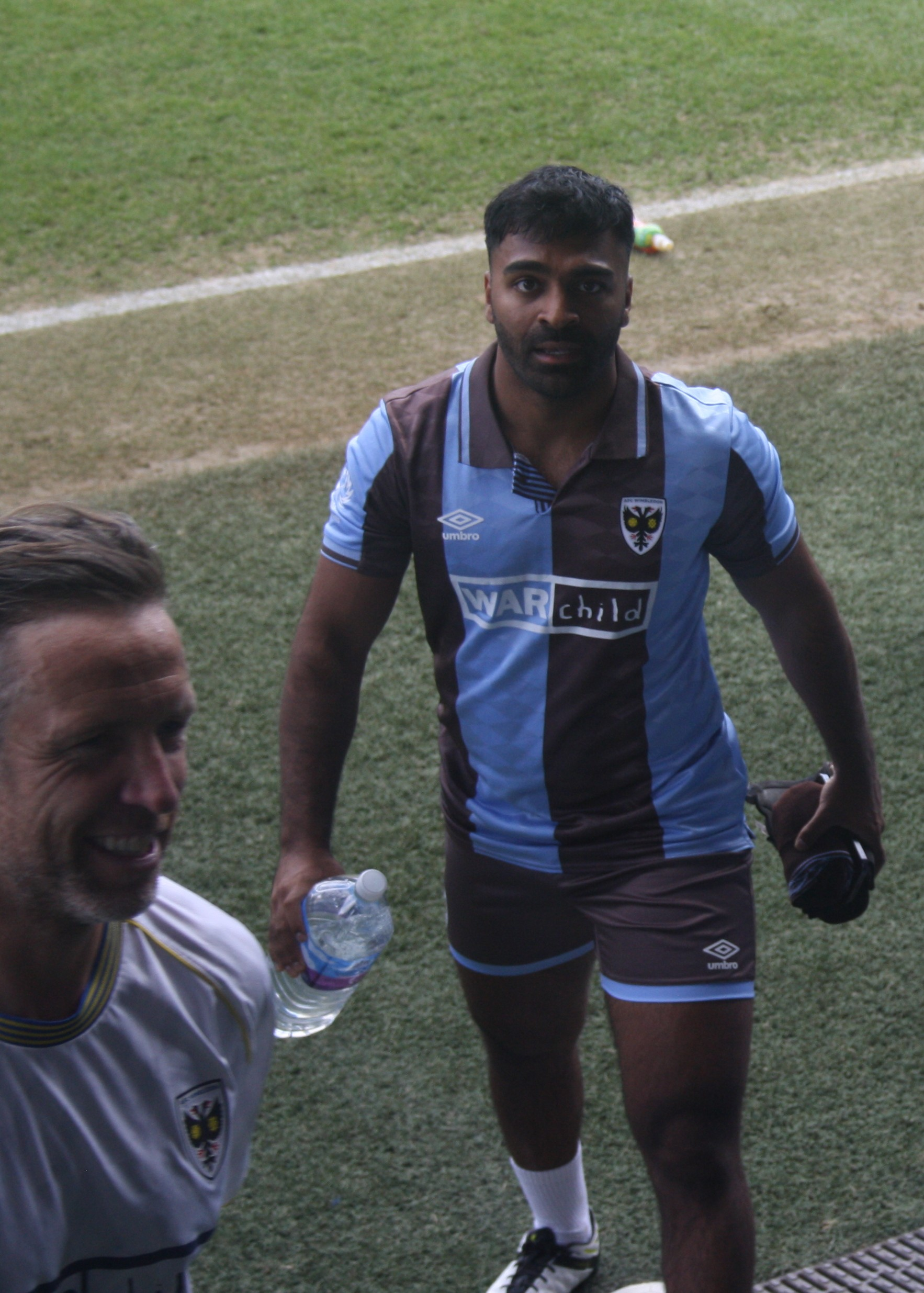
- Majeed in 2025
- Born: Naseem Jan Majeed; 24 February 1996 (age 29); Wandsworth, London, England
- Occupation: Television personality
- Years active: 2020–present
- Known for: Love Island; Love Island: All Stars

Naseem Jan Majeed (born 24 February 1996) is an English television personality, known for appearing as a contestant on the sixth series of the ITV2 dating show Love Island in 2020. He is set to appear on the second series of Love Island: All Stars in 2025.

== Life and career ==
Naseem Jan Majeed was born on 24 February 1996 in Wandsworth, London, to parents of Pakistani and Guyanese descent. Prior to appearing on television, he worked as a builder. In January 2020, he entered the Love Island villa to appear as one of the original contestants on the programme's sixth series, which was the first winter edition of the series and the first to air in South Africa. During his time in the villa, he was coupled up with Siânnise Fudge, Jess Gale and Demi Jones respectively, before coupling up with Eva Zapico during the show's "Casa Amor" twist. The pair were dumped from the villa on Day 30 of the series, after receiving the fewest votes to save from the public. They subsequently began a relationship. In March 2024, Majeed and Zapico announced their split after four years together. The following year, in January 2025, it was announced that Majeed would return to Love Island to appear as a contestant on the second series of Love Island: All Stars.

== Filmography ==
As himself
Year	Title	Notes	Ref.
2020	Love Island	Contestant; series 6	
2021	Where Next with the Stars	Guest; 1 episode	
2025	Love Island: All Stars	Contestant; series 2	
