= Ellie Jackson =

Welsh television personality

- Born: 2000 or 2001 (age 24–25); Cardiff, Wales
- Occupation: Television personality
- Years active: 2024–present

Ellie Jackson (born 2000 or 2001) is a Welsh reality television personality. She is known for appearing in the 11th series of Love Island in 2024.

Ellie Jackson was born in Cardiff, Wales. Prior to appearing in television, she worked as a senior executive assistant. She also started watching Love Island since the series started in 2015.

Jackson first appeared on television in 2024, on the 11th series of Love Island during Casa Amor where she entered on day 29, but was dumped on day 35. After appearing in Love Island, she started a career in accountancy.
