= Jessy Potts =

English television personality (born 1996)

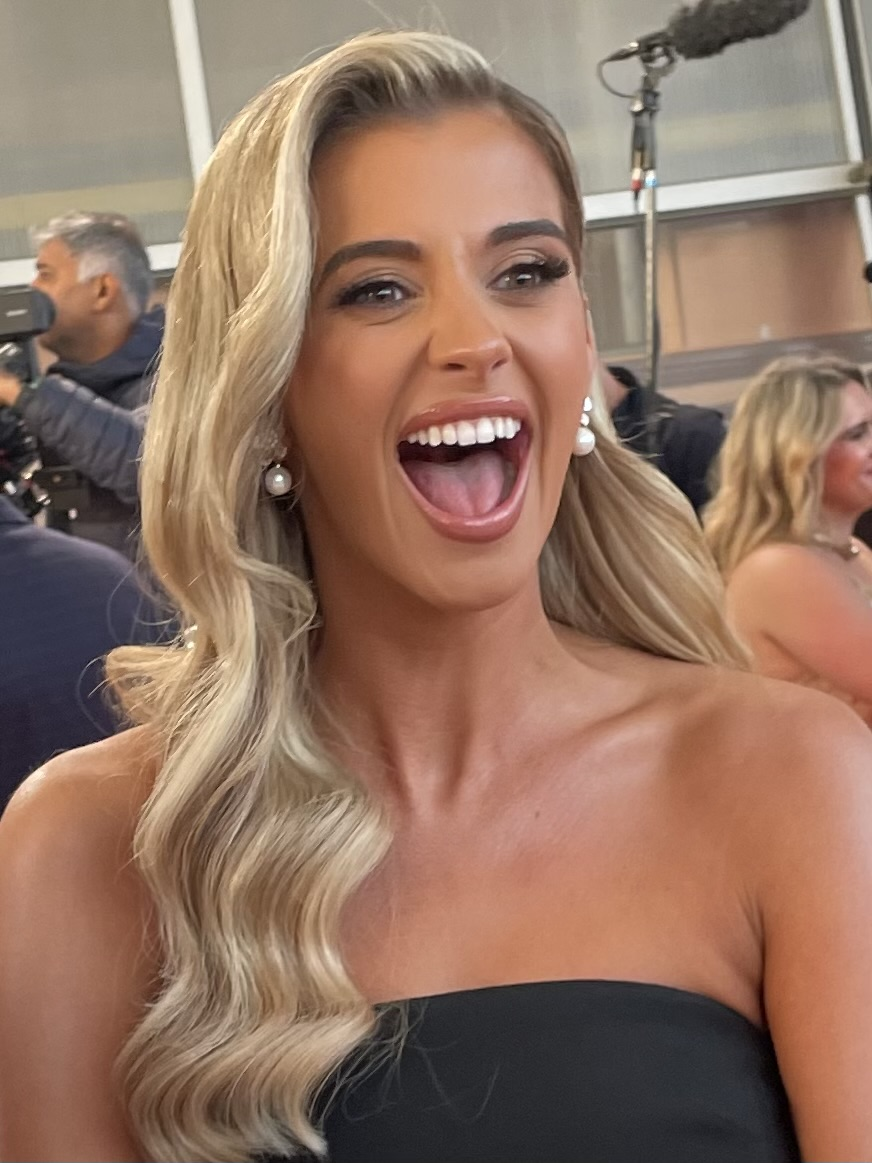
- Potts in 2024
- Born: Jessy Potts; 26 November 1998 (age 27); Leicester, England
- Occupation: Television personality
- Years active: 2024–present
- Known for: Love Island; Love Island: All Stars

Jessy Potts (born 26 November 1998) is an English television personality and social media influencer, known for appearing as a contestant on the eleventh series of Love Island in 2024 and the third series of Love Island: All Stars in 2026.

== Life and career ==
Potts was born on 26 November 1998 in Leicester, England. Prior to appearing on television, she worked as a brand partnerships associate. In June 2024, she became a contestant on the eleventh series of the ITV2 reality dating show Love Island. She entered the villa as a "bombshell" on Day 23 alongside Trey Norman, and subsequently coupled up with Joey Essex. The pair ultimately became the final couple to be dumped from the villa on Day 55. Potts and Essex subsequently entered a relationship, before splitting in September 2024. In February 2026, it was announced that Potts would return to Love Island two years after her original appearance, to appear as a contestant on the third series of Love Island: All Stars. She again entered as a "bombshell" contestant alongside Harrison Solomon.

== Filmography ==
As herself
Year	Title	Notes	Ref.
2024	Love Island	Contestant; series 11	
2026	Love Island: All Stars	Contestant; series 3	
