= Omar Nyame =

English television personality (born 1998)

- Born: 2 September 1998 (age 26); Croydon, London, England
- Occupation: Television personality
- Years active: 2024–present
- Known for: Love Island; Love Island: All Stars

Omar Nyame (born 2 September 1998) is an English television personality, known for appearing on the eleventh series of Love Island in 2024, and the second series of Love Island: All Stars in 2025

== Life and career ==
Omar Nyame was born on 2 September 1998 in Croydon, London. Prior to appearing on television, he worked as a PE teacher. In 2024, he became a contestant on the eleventh series of the ITV2 reality dating show Love Island. He entered the villa as a "bombshell" on Day 5, and during the series was coupled up with Uma Jammeh and Jess White, respectively. He was dumped from the island on Day 21 after being chosen to leave by his fellow islanders, alongside Tiffany Leighton. In January 2025, it was announced that Nyame would return to Love Island to appear as a contestant on the second series of Love Island: All Stars. He entered as a "bombshell" on Day 19 of the series.

== Filmography ==
As himself
Year	Title	Notes	Ref.
2024	Love Island	Contestant; series 11	
2025	Love Island: All Stars	Contestant; series 2	
