= Grace Jackson (TV personality) =

English television personality and model (born 2000)

- Born: Grace Rosà Jackson; 26 August 1998 (age 27); Salford, Greater Manchester, England
- Occupation: Television personality
- Years active: 2024–present
- Known for: Love Island; Love Island: All Stars

Grace Rosà Jackson (born 26 August 1998) is an English television personality, model and entrepreneur, known for appearing as a contestant on the eleventh series of the ITV2 dating show Love Island in 2024 and the second series of Love Island: All Stars in 2025.

== Life and career ==
Grace Rosà Jackson was born on 26 August 1998 in Salford, Greater Manchester. She is from Walkden. Prior to appearing on television, she worked as a model and runs a social media management agency, as well as an events company. In June 2024, she became a contestant on the eleventh series of the ITV2 reality series Love Island. She entered the villa as a "bombshell" on Day 12, and during the series was coupled up with Joey Essex, who was her ex prior to the show, Konnor Ewudzi, Blade Siddiqi and Reuben Collins, respectively. She was dumped from the island on Day 52 of the series. In January 2025, it was announced that Jackson would return to Love Island, six months after her original appearance, to appear as a contestant on the second series of Love Island: All Stars. She again entered the villa as a "bombshell" on Day 8 of the series. She coupled up with Luca Bish and they became favourites to win but the pair eventually finished as runner ups and they began dating.

== Filmography ==
As herself
Year	Title	Notes	Ref.
2024	Love Island	Contestant; series 11	
2025	Love Island: All Stars	Contestant; series 2	
