= Love Island (2015 TV series) series 11 =

2024 series of Love Island

Love Island
- Series 11
- Promotional poster for the series
- Presented by: Maya Jama
- No. of days: 48
- No. of contestants: 39
- Winners: Mimii Ngulube; Josh Oyinsan
- Runners-up: Ciaran Davies; Nicole Samuel
- Companion show: Love Island: Aftersun
- No. of episodes: 57

Release
- Original network: ITV2; ITV1 (launch show)
- Original release: 3 June – 29 July 2024

Series chronology
- ← Previous; Series 10 Next → Series 12

The eleventh series of Love Island began broadcasting on 3 June 2024, with the launch episode airing across both ITV1 and ITV2. Maya Jama returned to present the series, as well as the companion show Love Island: Aftersun. Iain Stirling again returned as the show's narrator.

On 29 July 2024, the series was won by Josh Oyinsan and Mimii Ngulube, who received 41% of the public vote, with Ciaran Davies and Nicole Samuel finishing as the runners-up.

== Production ==
In August 2023, during the broadcast of the tenth series, it was confirmed that Love Island would return for two series in 2024, the first of which was Love Island: All Stars, a spin-off series that aired from January to February earlier in the year and featured former contestants from previous series.

Applications for the eleventh series opened hours before the final episode of the tenth series. The first teaser for the series aired in April 2024, depicting a person in a silver boiler suit using a flamethrower, accompanied by the words "This summer's going to be fire." A further trailer released in May 2024 reveals the person to be presenter Maya Jama, who uses the flamethrower to set fire to a hanging heart before announcing the tagline "Where there's love, there's fire" and taking a sip from a Love Island water bottle which bears her name. The companion show Love Island: Aftersun returned for this series, after being shelved for the All Stars series, where the interviews were conducted during the show's broadcast. The social media ban was introduced as part of the new duty of care protocols in the ninth series, which returned, in which the contestants' friends and family will not be able to post on their behalf while they're in the villa. The eleventh series began on 3 June 2024 and was filmed in Sant Llorenç des Cardassar, Mallorca. Similar to the All Stars series, the launch episode aired simultaneously on both ITV1 and ITV2, with the remainder of the series broadcasting solely on the latter channel.

== Islanders ==
The original Islanders for the eleventh series were announced on 27 May 2024, one week before the series launch. Joey Essex entered the villa as a "bombshell" on the evening of Day 1, making him the first celebrity to appear on the revived version of the show.

Islander	Age	Hometown	Entered	Exited	Status	Ref
Josh Oyinsan	29	South London	Day 30	Day 48	Winner	
Michelle "Mimii" Ngulube	24	Portsmouth	Day 1	Day 48	Winner	
Ciaran Davies	21	Pencoed	Day 1	Day 48	Runner-up	
Nicole Samuel	24	Aberdare	Day 1	Day 48	Runner-up	
Matilda Draper	24	Beckenham	Day 15	Day 48	Third place	
Sean Stone	24	Hertford	Day 1	Day 48	Third place	
Ayo Odukoya	25	Canning Town	Day 1	Day 48	Fourth place	
Jess Spencer	25	London	Day 25	Day 48	Fourth place	
Jessy Potts	25	Leicester	Day 20	Day 46	Dumped	
Joey Essex	33	Chigwell	Day 1	Day 46	Dumped	
Grace Jackson	25	Manchester	Day 11	Day 43	Dumped	
Reuben Collins	23	Chertsey	Day 30	Day 43	Dumped	
Harry Baker	25	Birmingham	Day 37	Day 40	Dumped	
Lola Deluca	22	Surrey	Day 37	Day 40	Dumped	
Konnor Ewudzi	28	Cornwall	Day 15	Day 37	Dumped	
Lauren "Lolly" Hart	30	Loughborough	Day 33	Day 37	Dumped	
Blade Siddiqi	29	Stevenage	Day 24	Day 32	Dumped	
Emma Milton	30	Manchester	Day 25	Day 32	Dumped	
Hugo Godfroy	24	Southampton	Day 24	Day 32	Dumped	
Jess White	25	Stockport	Day 1	Day 32	Dumped	
Uma Jammeh	23	Islington	Day 3	Day 31	Walked	
Wil Anderson	23	Whitley Bay	Day 11	Day 31	Dumped	
Ellie Jackson	22	Cardiff	Day 25	Day 35	Dumped	
Trey Norman	24	Doncaster	Day 20	Day 35	Dumped	
Diamanté Laiva	21	Beckenham	Day 25	Day 27	Dumped	
Jake Spivey	25	Rayleigh	Day 24	Day 27	Dumped	
Joel Kirby	22	Devon	Day 24	Day 27	Dumped	
Lionel Awudu	24	Reading	Day 24	Day 27	Dumped	
Lucy Graybill	26	Gourock	Day 25	Day 27	Dumped	
Moziah Pinder	29	Brighton	Day 24	Day 27	Dumped	
Ruby Dale	23	Surrey	Day 25	Day 27	Dumped	
Harriett Blackmore	24	Brighton	Day 1	Day 23	Dumped	
Ronnie Vint	27	Greenwich	Day 1	Day 23	Dumped	
Omar Nyame	25	Croydon	Day 5	Day 18	Dumped	
Tiffany Leighton	25	Royston	Day 11	Day 18	Dumped	
Samantha Kenny	26	Liverpool	Day 1	Day 14	Dumped	
Munveer Jabbal	30	Surbiton	Day 1	Day 9	Dumped	
Patsy Field	29	Orpington	Day 1	Day 9	Dumped	
Sam Taylor	23	Chesterfield	Day 1	Day 2	Dumped	

=== Future appearances ===
In 2025, Harriett Blackmore, Grace Jackson, Omar Nyame and Ronnie Vint all returned for series two of Love Island: All Stars.

In 2026, Ciaran Davies, Konnor Ewudzi, Jessy Potts and Sean Stone all returned for series three of Love Island: All Stars. Vint competed on the fourth series of Celebrity Ex on the Beach.

== Coupling and elimination history ==
The couples were chosen shortly after the islanders entered the villa. For the first time in the show's history, the couples were determined by the islanders, unbeknownst to them in a challenge where they had to rank themselves from "Most to Least" boyfriend/girlfriend material.

	Week 1				Week 2			Week 3		Week 4			Week 5				Week 6				Week 7				Week 8
	Day 1	Day 2	Day 5	Day 7	Day 9	Day 10	Day 14	Day 18	Day 19	Day 22	Day 23	Day 27	Day 29	Day 31	Day 32	Day 34	Day 37	Day 38	Day 39	Day 40	Day 43	Day 45	Day 46		Final
Josh	Not in Villa													Mimii	Immune	Mimii	Safe	Mimii	Mimii	Safe	Safe	Jessy & Joey; Ayo & Jess S to dump	Vulnerable	Finalist	Winner (Day 48)
Mimii	Munveer		Single	Ayo	Safe	Ayo	Ayo	Safe	Ayo		Safe	Single	Immune	Josh	Safe	Josh	Safe	Josh	Josh	Safe	Safe	Jessy & Joey; Ayo & Jess S to dump	Vulnerable	Finalist	Winner (Day 48)
Ciaran	Harriett		Nicole		Safe	Nicole	Nicole	Safe	Nicole		Safe	Nicole	Safe	Nicole	Safe	Nicole	Konnor & Lolly to dump	Nicole	Nicole	Safe	Safe	Jessy & Joey; Ayo & Jess S to dump	Finalist		Runner-up (Day 48)
Nicole	Sean		Ciaran		Safe	Ciaran	Ciaran	Safe	Ciaran		Safe	Ciaran	Safe	Ciaran	Safe	Ciaran	Konnor & Lolly to dump	Ciaran	Ciaran	Safe	Safe	Jessy & Joey; Ayo & Jess S to dump	Finalist		Runner-up (Day 48)
Matilda	Not in Villa							Immune	Sean		Safe	Sean	Safe	Sean	Safe	Sean	Safe	Sean	Sean	Safe	Safe	Ayo & Jess S Josh & Mimii to dump	Vulnerable	Finalist	Third place (Day 48)
Sean	Nicole		Harriett		Vulnerable	Jess W	Harriett	Safe	Matilda		Safe	Matilda	Safe	Matilda	Safe	Matilda	Safe	Matilda	Matilda	Safe	Safe	Ayo & Jess S Josh & Mimii to dump	Vulnerable	Finalist	Third place (Day 48)
Ayo	Patsy		Uma	Mimii	Safe	Mimii	Mimii	Safe	Mimii		Safe	Jess S	Safe	Jess S	Vulnerable	Jess S	Vulnerable	Jess S	Jess S	Vulnerable	Safe	Matilda & Sean; Jessy & Joey to dump	Vulnerable	Finalist	Fourth place (Day 48)
Jess S	Not in Villa											Ayo	Safe	Ayo	Vulnerable	Ayo	Vulnerable	Ayo	Ayo	Vulnerable	Safe	Matilda & Sean; Jessy & Joey to dump	Vulnerable	Finalist	Fourth place (Day 48)
Jessy	Not in Villa									Joey	Immune	Joey	Safe	Joey	Safe	Joey	Safe	Joey	Joey	Safe	Safe	Josh & Mimii; Matilda & Sean to dump	Vulnerable	Eliminated	Dumped (Day 46)
Joey	Not in Villa	Samantha	Samantha		Safe	Samantha	Grace	Vulnerable	Jess W	Jessy	Immune	Jessy	Safe	Jessy	Safe	Jessy	Safe	Jessy	Jessy	Safe	Safe	Josh & Mimii; Matilda & Sean to dump	Vulnerable	Eliminated	Dumped (Day 46)
Grace	Not in Villa						Joey	Vulnerable	Konnor		Vulnerable	Blade	Safe	Blade	Safe	Reuben	Vulnerable	Harry	Reuben	Vulnerable	Eliminated	Dumped (Day 43)	Jessy & Joey to dump		Dumped (Day 43)
Reuben	Not in Villa													Uma	Immune	Grace	Vulnerable	Lola	Grace	Vulnerable	Eliminated	Dumped (Day 43)	Jessy & Joey to dump		Dumped (Day 43)
Harry	Not in Villa																	Grace	Lola	Eliminated	Dumped (Day 40)				
Lola	Not in Villa																	Ruben	Harry	Eliminated	Dumped (Day 40)				
Konnor	Not in Villa							Immune	Grace		Vulnerable	Emma	Safe	Emma	Safe	Lolly	Vulnerable	Dumped (Day 37)							
Lolly	Not in Villa															Konnor	Vulnerable	Dumped (Day 37)							
Blade	Not in Villa											Grace	Safe	Grace	Eliminated	Dumped (Day 32)									
Emma	Not in Villa											Konnor	Safe	Konnor	Eliminated	Dumped (Day 32)									
Hugo	Not in Villa											Jess W	Safe	Jess W	Eliminated	Dumped (Day 32)							Jessy & Joey to dump		Dumped (Day 32)
Jess W	Ronnie		Ronnie		Safe	Sean	Omar	Vulnerable	Joey	Trey	Immune	Hugo	Safe	Hugo	Eliminated	Dumped (Day 32)							Ayo & Jess S to dump		Dumped (Day 32)
Uma	Not in Villa		Ayo	Omar	Vulnerable	Omar	Wil	Vulnerable	Wil		Vulnerable	Wil	Safe	Reuben	Walked (Day 31)								Ayo & Jess S to dump		Walked (Day 31)
Wil	Not in Villa						Uma	Vulnerable	Uma		Vulnerable	Uma	Safe	Single	Dumped (Day 31)								Ayo & Jess S to dump		Dumped (Day 31)
Ellie	Not in Villa											Trey	Eliminated	Dumped (Day 29)											
Trey	Not in Villa									Jess W	Immune	Ellie	Eliminated	Dumped (Day 29)											
Diamanté	Not in Villa											Single	Dumped (Day 27)												
Jake	Not in Villa											Single	Dumped (Day 27)												
Joel	Not in Villa											Single	Dumped (Day 27)												
Lionel	Not in Villa											Single	Dumped (Day 27)												
Lucy	Not in Villa											Single	Dumped (Day 27)												
Moziah	Not in Villa											Single	Dumped (Day 27)												
Ruby	Not in Villa											Single	Dumped (Day 27)												
Harriett	Ciaran		Sean		Vulnerable	Ronnie	Sean	Safe	Ronnie		Eliminated	Dumped (Day 23)											Ayo & Jess S to dump		Dumped (Day 23)
Ronnie	Jess W		Jess W		Safe	Harriett	Tiffany	Vulnerable	Harriett		Eliminated	Dumped (Day 23)											Matilda & Sean to dump		Dumped (Day 23)
Omar	Not in Villa			Uma	Vulnerable	Uma	Jess W	Vulnerable	Dumped (Day 18)														Matilda & Sean to dump		Dumped (Day 18)
Tiffany	Not in Villa						Ronnie	Vulnerable	Dumped (Day 18)																
Samantha	Sam	Joey	Joey		Safe	Joey	Single	Dumped (Day 16)															Jessy & Joey to dump		Dumped (Day 16)
Munveer	Mimii		Patsy		Vulnerable	Dumped (Day 9)																	Jessy & Joey to dump		Dumped (Day 9)
Patsy	Ayo		Munveer		Vulnerable	Dumped (Day 9)																	Jessy & Joey to dump		Dumped (Day 9)
Sam	Samantha	Single	Dumped (Day 2)																				Jessy & Joey to dump		Dumped (Day 2)
Notes	none	1	none	2	3	none		4	none	5	6	7	8	9	10	none	11	12	none	13	14	15			16
Walked	none													Uma	none										
Dumped	No; Dumping	Sam; Failed to couple up	No; Dumping		Patsy; Boys' choice to dump	No; Dumping	Samantha; Failed to couple up	Omar, Tiffany; Islanders' choice to dump	No; Dumping		Harriett & Ronnie; Public's choice to dump	Diamanté, Jake, Joel, Lionel, Lucy, Moziah, Ruby; Failed to couple up	Ellie & Trey; Public's choice to dump	Wil; Failed to couple up	Blade, Emma, Hugo, Jess W Public's choice to dump	No; Dumping	Konnor & Lolly; Ciaran & Nicole's choice to dump	No; Dumping		Harry & Lola; Public's choice to dump	Grace & Reuben; Public's choice to dump	No; Dumping	Jessy & Joey; 7 of 13 votes to dump		Ayo & Jess S 10% to win
Dumped	No; Dumping	Sam; Failed to couple up	No; Dumping		Patsy; Boys' choice to dump	No; Dumping	Samantha; Failed to couple up	Omar, Tiffany; Islanders' choice to dump	No; Dumping		Harriett & Ronnie; Public's choice to dump	Diamanté, Jake, Joel, Lionel, Lucy, Moziah, Ruby; Failed to couple up	Ellie & Trey; Public's choice to dump	Wil; Failed to couple up	Blade, Emma, Hugo, Jess W Public's choice to dump	No; Dumping	Konnor & Lolly; Ciaran & Nicole's choice to dump	No; Dumping		Harry & Lola; Public's choice to dump	Grace & Reuben; Public's choice to dump	No; Dumping	Jessy & Joey; 7 of 13 votes to dump		Matilda & Sean; 14% to win
Dumped	No; Dumping	Sam; Failed to couple up	No; Dumping		Munveer; Girls’ choice to dump	No; Dumping	Samantha; Failed to couple up	Omar, Tiffany; Islanders' choice to dump	No; Dumping		Harriett & Ronnie; Public's choice to dump	Diamanté, Jake, Joel, Lionel, Lucy, Moziah, Ruby; Failed to couple up	Ellie & Trey; Public's choice to dump	Wil; Failed to couple up	Blade, Emma, Hugo, Jess W Public's choice to dump	No; Dumping	Konnor & Lolly; Ciaran & Nicole's choice to dump	No; Dumping		Harry & Lola; Public's choice to dump	Grace & Reuben; Public's choice to dump	No; Dumping	Jessy & Joey; 7 of 13 votes to dump		Ciaran & Nicole; 35% to win
Dumped	No; Dumping	Sam; Failed to couple up	No; Dumping		Munveer; Girls’ choice to dump	No; Dumping	Samantha; Failed to couple up	Omar, Tiffany; Islanders' choice to dump	No; Dumping		Harriett & Ronnie; Public's choice to dump	Diamanté, Jake, Joel, Lionel, Lucy, Moziah, Ruby; Failed to couple up	Ellie & Trey; Public's choice to dump	Wil; Failed to couple up	Blade, Emma, Hugo, Jess W Public's choice to dump	No; Dumping	Konnor & Lolly; Ciaran & Nicole's choice to dump	No; Dumping		Harry & Lola; Public's choice to dump	Grace & Reuben; Public's choice to dump	No; Dumping	Jessy & Joey; 7 of 13 votes to dump		Josh & Mimii; 41% to win

=== Notes ===
- ^Note 1: Joey arrived after the coupling on Day 1, but was told he would be able to steal a girl for himself on Day 2. He picked Samantha, leaving Sam single and dumped.
- ^Note 2: On Day 8, as single islanders, Mimii and Omar were given the opportunity to either recouple with each other, or steal an islander of their choice. They opted to steal and chose Ayo and Uma respectively.
- ^Note 3: On Day 9, after receiving the fewest public votes, Harriett and Sean, Patsy and Munveer, and Uma and Omar were all in danger of leaving. The safe islanders had to choose one boy and one girl to dump from the island. The boys chose Patsy, whilst the girls chose Munveer.
- ^Note 4: On Day 18, after receiving the fewest public votes, Jess W and Omar, Grace and Joey, Tiffany and Ronnie, and Uma and Wil were all in danger of leaving. The safe couples subsequently had to choose one boy and one girl to dump from the island. They collectively decided to dump Omar and Tiffany.
- ^Note 5: On Day 22, new islanders Jessy and Trey were told they could steal an islander of their choice. Jessy chose Joey, whilst Trey picked Jess W.
- ^Note 6: On Day 23, Harriett and Ronnie were dumped from the island after receiving the fewest public votes.
- ^Note 7: As the final part for the Casa Amor twist in week 4, Casa Amor and the villa held two separate re-coupling ceremonies for the original islanders to choose whether to return to their previous partner or pick any new partner. Any of the 11 new islanders that remained single by the end of either ceremony was dumped from the villa. However, if one of the 14 original islanders remained single at the end of both ceremonies, they would still remain in the villa, but as a single islander. Diamanté, Jake, Joel, Lionel, Lucy, Moziah, and Ruby remained single at the end the night, and were all dumped from the villa.
- ^Note 8: On Day 29, after receiving the fewest public votes for least compatible couple, Ellie and Trey were dumped from the island.
- ^Note 9: On Day 31, new islanders Josh and Reuben were told they could steal a girl of their choice. Josh chose Mimii, whilst Reuben picked Uma. As Wil was left single, he was therefore dumped from the villa.
- ^Note 10: On Day 32, following a public vote for the viewers' favourite boy and favourite girl, Ayo, Blade and Hugo, and Emma, Jess S and Jess W were all at risk of leaving. Blade, Emma, Hugo, and Jess W received the fewest votes and were therefore dumped from the island.
- ^Note 11: On Day 37, following a public vote for the viewer's most compatible couple, Lolly and Konnor, Grace and Reuben, and Jess S and Ayo, were all at risk of being dumped. It was then down to Ciaran and Nicole, who had received the most public votes, to decide which couple to dump. They chose Lolly and Konnor, who were therefore dumped from the island.
- ^Note 12: On Day 39, new islanders Harry and Lola were able to steal an islander of their choice. Harry chose Grace, whilst Lola picked Reuben.
- ^Note 13: On Day 40, following a public vote, Harry and Lola received the fewest votes and were therefore dumped from the island.
- ^Note 14: On Day 43, after being ranked the couple "least likely to work on the outside" by the public, Grace and Reuben were dumped from the island.
- ^Note 15: On Day 46, the couples voted for the couple they wanted to dump from the island. The couples who received the most votes were vulnerable of being dumped from the island. The islanders who did not receive any votes were safe and became finalist. On Day 47, the dumped islanders from the season returned to the villa to dump one couple from the villa. Omar and Ronnie voted for Matilda and Sean, Harriet, Jess W, Uma and Wil voted for Ayo and Jess S, and Grace, Hugo, Munveer, Patsy, Reuben, Sam and Samantha voted for Jessy and Joey. As Jessy and Joey received the most votes, they were dumped from the island.
- ^Note 16: The public voted for which couple they think should win Love Island. The couple with the most votes were declared the winners of Love Island and received the grand prize money.

== Weekly summary ==
The main events in the Love Island villa are summarised in the table below.

Week 1	Entrances	On Day 1, Ayo, Ciaran, Harriett, Jess W, Mimii, Munveer, Nicole, Patsy, Ronnie, Sam, Samantha and Sean entered the villa. Joey Essex entered the villa as the first bombshell the same evening.; On Day 3, Uma entered the villa.; On Day 5, Omar entered the villa.
Week 1	Coupling	On Day 1, following a challenge in which islanders were ranked based on who was "Most to Least" boyfriend/girlfriend material, the couples were determined as follows. Munveer was paired with Mimii, Sean with Nicole, Ronnie with Jess W, Ayo with Patsy, Sam with Samantha, and Ciaran with Harriett.; On Day 2, Joey was able to steal a girl of his choice. He stole Samantha, leaving Sam single and dumped.; On Day 5, the islanders recoupled for the first time with the boys picking which girl they'd like to be with. As a new islander, Uma was given the first choice and picked Ayo. Elsewhere, Ronnie and Jess W, and Joey and Samantha remained together, whilst Ciaran picked Nicole, Munveer chose Patsy, and Sean went with Harriett. As Mimii was not picked, she was left single.; On Day 7, single islanders Mimii and Omar were given the opportunity to either recouple with each other, or steal an islander of their choice. They opted to steal and chose Ayo and Uma respectively.
Week 1	Challenges	On Day 1, the islanders were asked to rank themselves in a challenge which unbeknownst to them would ultimately decide who would be coupled up with who. The girls had to rank the boys from who was "Most to Least" boyfriend material, whilst the boys had to rank the girls from who was "Most to Least" girlfriend material. The couples were then determined by who was placed in which position in both rankings. The boy ranked the "Most" boyfriend material would couple up with the girl ranked the "Most" girlfriend material and so on down the ranking until the boy ranked the "Least" boyfriend material and the girl ranked the "Least" girlfriend material were coupled up together.; On Day 1, the islanders competed in a game of dares, in which they had to pick up another islander's phone from the box before reading out a dare for them to complete.; On Day 3, the girls had to blindfold their boys unbeknownst to them that new islander, Uma, would kiss each of the boys before choosing two to take to the hideaway. She chose Ayo and Joey respectively.; On Day 6, the islanders took part in a game where they had to pop a balloon with their bodies using another islander and a sex position. They then had to perform the dare written inside the balloon.
Week 1	Dates	On Day 5, as the latest single islander, Mimii left the villa to go on a date with new islander Omar.; On Day 6, Ciaran and Nicole left the villa to go on their first date.
Week 1	Exits	On Day 2, following Joey's decision to couple up with Samantha, Sam was left single and dumped from the island.
Week 2	Entrances	On Day 11, Grace, Tiffany and Wil entered the villa.
Week 2	Coupling	On Day 10, the islanders recoupled for the second time with the girls picking which boy they'd like to be with. Ciaran and Nicole, Joey and Samantha, Ayo and Mimii, and Omar and Uma remained together, whilst Harriett picked Ronnie and Jess W picked Sean.; On Day 14, the islanders recoupled again, with the boys picking which girl they'd like to be with. As new islanders, Grace, Tiffany and Wil were given first choice and picked Joey, Ronnie and Uma respectively. Ayo and Mimii and Ciaran and Nicole remained together, whilst Sean chose Harriett and Omar coupled up with Jess W. Samantha was left single and therefore dumped from the island.
Week 2	Challenges	On Day 8, the islanders took part in "On Job", in which the girls were dressed as office bosses and had two folders; green and red. The green folder contained a sex position which they had to act out with a boy of their choice, whilst the red folder contained a negative statement and the girls had to choose which boy suited the statement best, before throwing a cup of tea in their face.; On Day 11, islanders played a game of beer pong in which they separated into boys and girls and had to throw a ping pong ball across a table and if it landed in a cup, a member of the opposing team would have to complete the dare written on the bottom of said cup.
Week 2	Dates	On Day 10, Joey and Samantha left the villa to go on their first date.; On Day 11, all couples had a breakfast date in the garden.; On Day 12, new islanders Grace, Tiffany and Wil were each able to choose an islander to spend a night away with in a separate villa. They chose Joey, Ronnie and Uma respectively.
Week 2	Exits	On Day 9, after receiving the fewest public votes, Harriett and Sean, Patsy and Munveer, and Uma and Omar were all in danger of leaving. The safe islanders had to choose one boy and one girl to dump from the island. The boys chose Patsy, whilst the girls chose Munveer.; On Day 14, Samantha was dumped from the island after failing to couple up.
Week 3	Entrances	On Day 15, Konnor and Matilda entered the villa.; On Day 20, Jessy and Trey entered the villa.
Week 3	Coupling	On Day 19, the islanders recoupled again, with the girls picking which boy they'd like to be with. As new islanders, Matilda and Konnor were given first choice and picked Sean and Grace respectively. Ciaran and Nicole, Ayo and Mimii and Uma and Wil remained together, whilst Harriett chose Ronnie, leaving Jess W to couple up with Joey.
Week 3	Challenges	On Day 16, the islanders competed in "Suck and Blow" in which they had to pass a card to the next person using only their mouth. Any islander who dropped the card would have to complete a dare.; On Day 20, the boys and girls went head-to-head to raise their opposing team's heart rate. At the end of the game they were each told who raised their heart rate the most.; On Day 21, the islanders played a game of "Never Have I Ever".
Week 3	Dates	On Day 15, Ayo and Mimii left the villa to go on their first date.; On Day 15, new islanders Konnor and Matilda were asked to choose three other islanders to take on dates with each of them preparing a starter, a main course and a dessert. Konnor picked Grace, Nicole and Mimii, whilst Matilda chose Omar, Sean and Wil.; On Day 19, Harriett and Ronnie left the villa to go on their first date.; On Day 20, Joey and Jess W left the villa to go on a date with new islanders Jessy and Trey.
Week 3	Exits	On Day 18, after receiving the fewest public votes, Jess W and Omar, Grace and Joey, Tiffany and Ronnie, and Uma and Wil were all in danger of leaving. The safe couples subsequently had to choose one boy and one girl to dump from the island. They collectively decided to dump Tiffany and Omar.
Week 4	Entrances	On Day 24, Blade, Hugo, Jake, Joel, Lionel and Moziah entered Casa Amor.; On Day 25, Diamanté, Ellie, Emma, Jess S, Lucy and Ruby entered the Main Villa.
Week 4	Coupling	On Day 22, new islanders Jessy and Trey were told they could steal an islander of their choice. Jessy chose Joey, whilst Trey picked Jess W.; On Day 27, the original Islanders were told that they would be re-coupling. They were only given the option to remain in their current couple or to choose one of the new Islanders. However, as the boys and the girls were living in separate villas, they were not aware of what the other one chose. If one decided to re-couple and the other did not, then they would be single but still remain on the island. If both re-coupled then they would both remain in the villa with their new partner, and any remaining single new islanders would be dumped. Konnor recoupled with Emma, Ciaran and Nicole remained together, as did Matilda and Sean, Uma and Wil, and Jessy and Joey, whilst Trey picked Ellie, Grace chose Blade, Jess W chose Hugo, and Ayo decided to recouple with Jess S. As Mimii's original partner failed to recouple with her, she remained single. The new single islanders were then dumped from the villa.
Week 4	Challenges	On Day 24, the islanders in Casa Amor played a game of "Truth or Dare".; On Day 25, the Main Villa and Casa Amor competed in "Raunchy Races" where they had to complete a certain task quicker than the other villa. The game was won by the Main Villa, who subsequently won a party for that evening.
Week 4	Exits	On Day 23, Harriett and Ronnie were dumped from the island after receiving the fewest public votes.; On Day 27, new islanders Diamanté, Jake, Joel, Lionel, Lucy, Moziah and Ruby were dumped from the island after failing to couple up.
Week 5	Entrances	On Day 30, Josh and Reuben entered the villa.; On Day 33, Lolly entered the villa.
Week 5	Coupling	On Day 31, new islanders Josh and Reuben were told they could steal a girl of their choice. Josh chose Mimii, whilst Reuben picked Uma, the latter decision of which left Wil single and therefore dumped.; On Day 34, the islanders recoupled with the girls choosing which boy they wanted to couple up with. As the newest islander, Lolly was able to choose first and went with Konnor. Grace chose Reuben, whilst all other couples remained together, with Ciaran and Nicole, Jessy and Joey, Matilda and Sean and Jess S and Ayo coupling up again, and Mimii opted to couple with Josh after he chose her three days prior.
Week 5	Challenges	On Day 32, the girls competed in "Sauciest Snogger", in which they had to kiss each boy in turn. The boys, who were blindfolded, would subsequently give each of the girls a score out of ten. Matilda received the most points and ultimately won the challenge.; On Day 35, the islanders took part in "Game, Sex, Match", hosted by Lolly and Konnor, in which the islanders were dressed as tennis players and had to answer a series of questions about themselves and the other islanders, and if they got the question right, they would take a step forward towards the net, however if they got it wrong, they would have squash thrown in their face. Grace and Reuben, and Josh and Mimii answered the most questions correctly and won the challenge.
Week 5	Dates	On Day 30, Jessy, Mimii and Uma were chosen to go on a date with new islanders Josh and Reuben.; On Day 33, new islander Lolly went on dates in the hideaway with three boys of her choice. She chose Joey, Konnor and Ciaran respectively.; On Day 34, Matilda and Sean left the villa to go on their first date.
Week 5	Exits	On Day 29, after receiving the fewest public votes for least compatible couple, Ellie and Trey were dumped from the island.; On Day 31, following Reuben's decision to couple up with Uma, Wil was left single and was therefore dumped from the island. However, Uma decided to voluntarily leave the villa also, and subsequently left the villa alongside Wil.; On Day 32, following a public vote for the viewers' favourite boy and favourite girl, Ayo, Blade and Hugo, and Emma, Jess S and Jess W were all at risk of leaving. Blade, Hugo, Emma and Jess W received the fewest votes and were therefore dumped from the island.
Week 6	Entrances	On Day 37, Harry and Lola entered the villa.
Week 6	Coupling	On Day 38, new islanders Harry and Lola were able to steal an islander of their choice to couple up with. Harry chose Grace, whilst Lola picked Reuben.; On Day 39, the islanders recoupled for the final time. Ciaran and Nicole, Jessy and Joey, Matilda and Sean, Jess S and Ayo, and Josh and Mimii all remained together, whilst Grace and Reuben recoupled together again after being stolen by new islanders Harry and Lola two days prior, who in turn coupled up with each other.
Week 6	Challenges	On Day 36, the islanders competed in the "Snog, Marry, Pie" challenge where each islander had to snog, marry and pie an islander of the opposite gender.; On Day 37, the islanders played a game in which they had to transfer an ice cube using only their mouths across the group, and whoever dropped the ice cube would have to complete a dare.; On Day 39, the couples took part in "Couple Goals", in which they were given a series of questions and had to write down the name of the couple they believed the question most applied to, before revealing their answers to the group.; On Day 42, the islanders took part in a talent show, after which they had to collectively decide who was the winner. They chose Jessy.
Week 6	Dates	On Day 40, Josh and Mimii left the villa to go on their first date.
Week 6	Exits	On Day 37, following a public vote for the viewer's most compatible couple, Lolly and Konnor, Grace and Reuben, and Jess S and Ayo, were all at risk of being dumped. It was then down to Ciaran and Nicole, who had received the most public votes, to decide which couple to dump. They chose Lolly and Konnor, who were therefore dumped from the island.; On Day 40, during the "Grafties" awards, Grace and Reuben, Jess S and Ayo and Lola and Harry were announced as the "Least Favourite" couples following a viewer's vote. Lola and Harry received the fewest votes and were therefore dumped from the island.
Week 7	Challenges	On Day 43, the islanders took part in "Couple of Sorts, in which they had to correctly guess the order the public had ranked each couple in a series of categories by placing themselves on "1st", "2nd" and "3rd" podiums. The final question was "Which couple is least likely to work on the outside?". As the public ranked Grace and Reuben least likely, they were subsequently dumped as a result.; On Day 45, the islanders were split into two teams and competed against each other in a number of sports day events. Jessy and Nicole were appointed team captains of the Pink and Blue team respectively. The Pink team was made up of Jessy, Matilda, Mimii, Ayo and Joey, whilst the Blue team consisted of Nicole, Ciaran, Jess S, Josh, and Sean. The Blue team succeeded in the majority of events and were declared the winners.
Week 7	Dates	On Day 44, the remaining couples each went on their final dates in the garden.
Week 7	Exits	On Day 43, after being ranked the couple "least likely to work on the outside" by the public, Grace and Reuben were dumped from the island.; On Day 46, several of the ex-islanders re-entered the villa to decide which of the vulnerable couples would be dumped. Harriett, Jess W, Uma and Wil voted to dump Jess S and Ayo, whilst Omar and Ronnie chose Matilda and Sean. Meanwhile, Grace, Hugo, Munveer, Patsy, Reuben, Sam and Samantha chose to dump Jessy and Joey, who were ultimately dumped from villa after receiving the most votes.; On Day 48, Jess S and Ayo finished in fourth place and Matilda and Sean finished third. Mimii and Josh were then announced as the winners, leaving Nicole and Ciaran as runners-up.

== Episodes ==
No. overall	No. in series	Title	Day(s)	Original release date	Prod. code
Week 1
414	1	"Episode 1"	Day 1	3 June 2024	1101
415	2	"Episode 2"	Days 1–2	4 June 2024	1102
416	3	"Episode 3"	Days 2–3	5 June 2024	1103
417	4	"Episode 4"	Days 3–4	6 June 2024	1104
418	5	"Episode 5"	Days 4–5	7 June 2024	1105
419	6	"Episode 6: Unseen Bits"	N/A (Note: This episode showcased events from the previous days in the week. No new or present days were featured.)	8 June 2024	1106
420	7	"Episode 7"	Days 5–6	9 June 2024	1107
421	8	"Episode 8"	Days 6–7	10 June 2024	1108
Week 2
422	9	"Episode 9"	Days 7–8	11 June 2024	1109
423	10	"Episode 10"	Days 8–9	12 June 2024	1110
424	11	"Episode 11"	Days 9–10	13 June 2024	1111
425	12	"Episode 12"	Days 10–11	14 June 2024	1112
426	13	"Episode 13: Unseen Bits"	N/A	15 June 2024	1113
427	14	"Episode 14"	Days 11–12	16 June 2024	1114
428	15	"Episode 15"	Days 12–13	17 June 2024	1115
429	16	"Episode 16"	Days 13–14	18 June 2024	1116
Week 3
430	17	"Episode 17"	Days 14–15	19 June 2024	1117
431	18	"Episode 18"	Days 15–16	20 June 2024	1118
432	19	"Episode 19"	Days 16–17	21 June 2024	1119
433	20	"Episode 20: Unseen Bits"	N/A	22 June 2024	1120
434	21	"Episode 21"	Days 17–18	23 June 2024	1121
435	22	"Episode 22"	Days 18–19	24 June 2024	1122
436	23	"Episode 23"	Days 19–20	25 June 2024	1123
437	24	"Episode 24"	Days 20–21	26 June 2024	1124
Week 4
438	25	"Episode 25"	Days 21–22	27 June 2024	1125
439	26	"Episode 26"	Days 22–23	28 June 2024	1126
440	27	"Episode 27: Unseen Bits"	N/A	29 June 2024	1127
441	28	"Episode 28"	Days 23–24	30 June 2024	1128
442	29	"Episode 29"	Days 24–25	1 July 2024	1129
443	30	"Episode 30"	Day 25	2 July 2024	1130
444	31	"Episode 31"	Day 26–27	3 July 2024	1131
445	32	"Episode 32"	Day 27	4 July 2024	1132
446	33	"Episode 33"	Day 28	5 July 2024	1133
Week 5
447	34	"Episode 34: Unseen Bits"	N/A	6 July 2024	1134
448	35	"Episode 35"	Days 28–29	7 July 2024	1135
449	36	"Episode 36"	Days 29–30	8 July 2024	1136
450	37	"Episode 37"	Days 30–31	9 July 2024	1137
451	38	"Episode 38"	Days 31–32	10 July 2024	1138
452	39	"Episode 39"	Days 32–33	11 July 2024	1139
453	40	"Episode 40"	Days 33–34	12 July 2024	1140
454	41	"Episode 41: Unseen Bits"	N/A	13 July 2024	1141
455	42	"Episode 42"	Day 34–35	14 July 2024	1142
Week 6
456	43	"Episode 43"	Day 35–36	15 July 2024	1143
457	44	"Episode 44"	Day 36–37	16 July 2024	1144
458	45	"Episode 45"	Day 37–38	17 July 2024	1145
459	46	"Episode 46"	Day 38–39	18 July 2024	1146
460	47	"Episode 47"	Day 39–40	19 July 2024	1147
461	48	"Episode 48: Unseen Bits"	N/A	20 July 2024	1158
462	49	"Episode 49"	Day 40	21 July 2024	1149
463	50	"Episode 50"	Days 40–41	22 July 2024	1150
464	51	"Episode 51"	Days 41–42	23 July 2024	1151
Week 7
465	52	"Episode 52"	Days 42–43	24 July 2024	1152
466	53	"Episode 53"	Days 43–44	25 July 2024	1153
467	54	"Episode 54"	Days 44–45	26 July 2024	1154
468	55	"Episode 55: Unseen Bits"	N/A	27 July 2024	1155
469	56	"Episode 56"	Day 46	28 July 2024	1156
470	57	"Episode 57"	Days 47–48	29 July 2024	1157

== Ratings ==
Official ratings are taken from BARB. Because the Saturday episodes are "Unseen Bits" episodes rather than nightly highlights, these are not included in the overall averages. Viewing figures are consolidated 7-day viewing figures with pre-broadcast viewing and viewing on tablets, PCs and smartphones included. Figures marked N/A were not included in the top 50 weekly ratings.

	Viewers (millions)								
	Week 1	Week 2	Week 3	Week 4	Week 5	Week 6	Week 7	Week 8	Week 9
Sunday		N/A	2.40	2.39	2.26	2.40	2.44	2.44	2.25
Monday	2.73	N/A	2.36	2.26	2.37	2.39	2.52	2.22	N/A
Tuesday	2.50	N/A	2.30	2.41	2.49	N/A	2.35	2.36	
Wednesday	2.53	2.38	2.34	2.44	2.49	2.43	2.53	N/A	
Thursday	2.41	N/A	N/A	2.30	2.41	2.44	2.31	N/A	
Friday	N/A	N/A	N/A	N/A	N/A	N/A	N/A	N/A	
Series average	N/A								
