= Ronnie Vint =

English television personality and footballer (born 1996)

Personal information
- Full name: Ronnie Christopher Vint
- Date of birth: 17 July 1996 (age 30)
- Place of birth: Greenwich, London, England
- Position: Centre-back

Team information
- Current team: Ashford United

Youth career
- 2013–2014: Dartford

Senior career*
Years	Team	Apps	(Gls)
2013–2020	Dartford		
2020–2021	Dulwich Hamlet		
2020–2021	Dartford		
2021–2022	Dulwich Hamlet		
2021–2022	Dartford		
2021–2022	Dulwich Hamlet		
2023–2024	Lewes		
2024–2025	Margate		
2024–	Ashford United		
- * Club domestic league appearances and goals

Ronnie Christopher Vint (born 17 July 1996) is an English television personality and semi-professional footballer, currently plays as a centre-back for Ashford United, having previously appeared for clubs including Dartford and Dulwich Hamlet. He is known for appearing as a contestant on the eleventh series of the ITV2 dating show Love Island in 2024, as well as appearing on the second series of Love Island: All Stars in 2025.

== Life and career ==
=== Early life and football career ===
Ronnie Christopher Vint was born on 17 July 1996 in Greenwich, London. He began his youth career in football playing for Dartford as a centre-back, and has subsequently gone on to play for the club in his senior career. He later went on to play for Dulwich Hamlet and Lewes. In 2024, he joined Margate and Ashford United.

=== Television ===
In June 2024, he entered the Love Island villa to appear as one of the original contestants on the show's eleventh series. During his time in the villa, he was coupled up with Jess White and Tiffany Leighton respectively, before ultimately coupling up with Harriett Blackmore. Vint and Blackmore were dumped from the villa on Day 26 of the series, after receiving the fewest votes to save from the public. In January 2025, it was announced that Vint would return to Love Island to appear as a contestant on the second series of Love Island: All Stars.

== Filmography ==
As himself
Year	Title	Notes	Ref.
2024	Love Island	Contestant; series 11	
2024	Love Island: Aftersun	Guest	
2025	Love Island: All Stars	Contestant; series 2	
