= Love Island: All Stars series 2 =

2025 series of Love Island: All Stars

Love Island: All Stars
- Series 2
- Presented by: Maya Jama
- No. of days: 32
- No. of contestants: 24
- Winners: Gabby Allen; Casey O'Gorman
- Runners-up: Luca Bish; Grace Jackson
- No. of episodes: 36

Release
- Original network: ITV2
- Original release: 13 January – 17 February 2025

Series chronology
- ← Previous; Series 1 Next → Series 3

The second series of Love Island: All Stars, a spin-off of the reality series Love Island, began broadcasting on ITV2 on 13 January 2025. It features former contestants from previous series. Maya Jama returned to present the series, with Iain Stirling returning as narrator. The series ended after 36 days on 17 February 2025. It was won by Casey O'Gorman and Gabby Allen, who were previously contestants on the ninth and third series respectively.

== Production ==
In May 2024, it was confirmed that Love Island: All Stars would return for a second series to commemorate the ten-year anniversary of Love Island on ITV2. Prior to the beginning of the series, several former contestants were rumoured to be appearing on the show. Ovie Soko, who appeared on the fifth series of Love Island, said in response to the rumours that he was "never going on Love Island: All Stars", adding that he [loved] the show but that he felt he was too old to return. Meanwhile Gemma Owen, a contestant on the eighth series who was also rumoured to be returning for All Stars, denied she would be appearing.

Maya Jama was confirmed to be returning as presenter, whilst Iain Stirling, who has narrated the show since its inception, returned also. eBay returned as the sponsor for this series. The first trailer for the series aired on 21 December 2024, depicting snippets of paintings featuring body parts of this year's islanders. An artist subsequently states "Madame it's finished" [sic], before host Maya Jama responds "Finished? We're just getting started." The series began airing on 13 January 2025.

== Islanders ==
The original returning Islanders for the second All Stars series were announced on 7 January 2025.

Islander	Age	Hometown	Original series	Entered	Exited	Status	Ref.
Casey O'Gorman	28	Tring	Series 9	Day 2	Day 32	Winner	
Gabby Allen	32	Liverpool	Series 3	Day 1	Day 32	Winner	
Grace Jackson	26	Manchester	Series 11	Day 7	Day 32	Runner-up	
Luca Bish	25	Brighton	Series 8	Day 1	Day 32	Runner-up	
Curtis Pritchard	28	Whitchurch	Series 5	Day 1	Day 32	Third place	
Ekin-Su Cülcüloğlu	30	Essex	Series 8	Day 1	Day 32	Third place	
Catherine Agbaje	24	Tyrrelstown	Series 10	Day 1	Day 32	Fourth place	
Omar Nyame	26	Croydon	Series 11	Day 17	Day 32	Fourth place	
Elma Pazar	32	Essex	Series 5	Day 1	Day 32	Fifth place	
Sammy Root	23	Kent	Series 10	Day 14	Day 32	Fifth place	
Harriett Blackmore	24	Brighton	Series 11	Day 10	Day 30	Dumped	
Ronnie Vint	28	Greenwich	Series 11	Day 1	Day 30	Dumped	
Oliver "Chuggs" Wallis	26	Weybridge	Series 7	Day 19	Day 25	Dumped	
Tina Stinnes	29	London	Series 2	Day 5	Day 25	Dumped	
Danielle Sellers	29	Hastings	Series 3	Day 14	Day 23	Dumped	
Samie Elishi	24	Camden	Series 9	Day 19	Day 23	Dumped	
Ron Hall	27	Essex	Series 9	Day 7	Day 19	Walked	
Scott Thomas	36	Manchester	Series 2	Day 1	Day 18	Walked	
Kaz Crossley	29	London	Series 4	Day 1	Day 14	Dumped	
Montel McKenzie	27	London	Series 10	Day 10	Day 14	Dumped	
Nas Majeed	28	London	Series 6	Day 1	Day 14	Dumped	
Marcel Somerville	39	London	Series 3	Day 1	Day 9	Dumped	
Olivia Hawkins	29	Brighton	Series 9	Day 1	Day 9	Dumped	
India Reynolds	34	Reading	Series 5	Day 1	Day 6	Dumped	

=== Future appearances ===
In 2025, Casey O'Gorman and Gabby Allen competed on season two of Love Island Games.

In 2026, Samie Elishi and Curtis Pritchard returned for series three of Love Island: All Stars. Danielle Sellers and Ronnie Vint competed on the fourth series of Celebrity Ex on the Beach.

== Coupling and elimination history ==
	Week 1				Week 2			Week 3			Week 4			Week 5		Final
	Day 1	Day 2	Day 4	Day 6	Day 8	Day 9	Day 11	Day 14	Day 16	Day 17	Day 21	Day 23	Day 25	Day 30		Final
Casey	Not in Villa		Gabby			Safe	Gabby	Safe	Gabby	Gabby		Gabby	Safe	Finalist		Winner (Day 32)
Gabby	Marcel		Casey			Safe	Casey	Safe	Casey	Casey		Casey	Safe	Finalist		Winner (Day 32)
Grace	Not in Villa				Luca	Immune	Luca	Safe	Luca	Luca	Single	Luca	Safe	Finalist		Runner-up (Day 32)
Luca	Olivia		Kaz		Grace	Immune	Grace	Tina to save	Grace	Grace	Samie	Grace	Safe	Finalist		Runner-up (Day 32)
Curtis	Kaz	Ekin-Su	Ekin-Su			Safe	Ekin-Su	Safe	Danielle	Ekin-Su		Ekin-Su	Vulnerable	Finalist		Third place (Day 32)
Ekin-Su	Not in Villa	Curtis	Curtis			Safe	Curtis	Safe	Single	Curtis		Curtis	Vulnerable	Finalist		Third place (Day 32)
Catherine	Nas		Nas			Vulnerable	Nas	Safe	Nas	Omar		Omar	Safe	Vulnerable	Finalist	Fourth place (Day 32)
Omar	Not in Villa									Catherine		Catherine	Safe	Vulnerable	Finalist	Fourth place (Day 32)
Elma	Ronnie		Ronnie			Vulnerable	Ronnie	Tina to save	Sammy	Sammy		Sammy	Safe	Vulnerable	Finalist	Fifth place (Day 32)
Sammy	Not in Villa								Elma	Elma		Elma	Safe	Vulnerable	Finalist	Fifth place (Day 32)
Harriett	Not in Villa						Ron	Safe	Ron	Ronnie		Ronnie	Vulnerable	Vulnerable	Eliminated	Dumped (Day 30)
Ronnie	Elma		Elma			Vulnerable	Elma	Safe	Single	Harriett		Harriett	Vulnerable	Vulnerable	Eliminated	Dumped (Day 30)
Chuggs	Not in Villa										Danielle	Tina	Vulnerable	Harriett & Ronnie to dump		Dumped (Day 25)
Tina	Not in Villa			Scott		Safe	Scott	Vulnerable	Scott	Scott	Single	Chuggs	Vulnerable	Harriett & Ronnie to dump		Dumped (Day 25)
Danielle	Not in Villa								Curtis	Ron	Chuggs	Single	Dumped (Day 23)	Harriett & Ronnie to dump		Dumped (Day 23)
Samie	Not in Villa										Luca	Single	Dumped (Day 23)	Harriett & Ronnie to dump		Dumped (Day 23)
Ron	Not in Villa				Kaz	Immune	Harriett	Safe	Harriett	Danielle	Walked (Day 19)			Elma & Sammy to dump		Walked (Day 19)
Scott	India		India	Tina		Safe	Tina	Safe	Tina	Tina	Walked (Day 18)					
Kaz	Curtis	Single	Luca		Ron	Immune	Montel	Vulnerable	Dumped (Day 14)					Elma & Sammy to dump		Dumped (Day 14)
Montel	Not in Villa						Kaz	Vulnerable	Dumped (Day 14)					Harriett & Ronnie to dump		Dumped (Day 14)
Nas	Catherine		Catherine			Vulnerable	Catherine	Vulnerable	Dumped (Day 14)					Elma & Sammy to dump		Dumped (Day 14)
Marcel	Gabby		Olivia			Eliminated	Dumped (Day 9)							Elma & Sammy to dump		Dumped (Day 9)
Olivia	Luca		Marcel			Eliminated	Dumped (Day 9)							Harriett & Ronnie to dump		Dumped (Day 9)
India	Scott		Scott	Single	Dumped (Day 6)									Elma & Sammy to dump		Dumped (Day 6)
Notes	1	2	none	3	4	5	6	7	8	none	9	none	10	11		12
Walked	none									Scott, Ron	none					
Dumped	No; Dumping			India; Failed to couple up	No; Dumping	Marcel & Olivia; Public's choice to dump	No; Dumping	Kaz, Montel, Nas; Elma and Luca's choice to dump	No; Dumping			Danielle, Samie; Failed to couple up	Chuggs & Tina; Public's choice to dump	Harriett & Ronnie; 6 of 11 votes to dump		Elma & Sammy; 6.34% to win
Dumped	No; Dumping			India; Failed to couple up	No; Dumping	Marcel & Olivia; Public's choice to dump	No; Dumping	Kaz, Montel, Nas; Elma and Luca's choice to dump	No; Dumping			Danielle, Samie; Failed to couple up	Chuggs & Tina; Public's choice to dump	Harriett & Ronnie; 6 of 11 votes to dump		Catherine & Omar; 8.14% to win
Dumped	No; Dumping			India; Failed to couple up	No; Dumping	Marcel & Olivia; Public's choice to dump	No; Dumping	Kaz, Montel, Nas; Elma and Luca's choice to dump	No; Dumping			Danielle, Samie; Failed to couple up	Chuggs & Tina; Public's choice to dump	Harriett & Ronnie; 6 of 11 votes to dump		Curtis & Ekin-Su; 21.74% to win
Dumped	No; Dumping			India; Failed to couple up	No; Dumping	Marcel & Olivia; Public's choice to dump	No; Dumping	Kaz, Montel, Nas; Elma and Luca's choice to dump	No; Dumping			Danielle, Samie; Failed to couple up	Chuggs & Tina; Public's choice to dump	Harriett & Ronnie; 6 of 11 votes to dump		Grace & Luca; 30.38% to win
Dumped	No; Dumping			India; Failed to couple up	No; Dumping	Marcel & Olivia; Public's choice to dump	No; Dumping	Kaz, Montel, Nas; Elma and Luca's choice to dump	No; Dumping			Danielle, Samie; Failed to couple up	Chuggs & Tina; Public's choice to dump	Harriett & Ronnie; 6 of 11 votes to dump		Casey & Gabby; 33.37% to win

=== Notes ===
- ^Note 1: Ahead of the show's launch, voting opened for the public to decide the first couplings of the series. After the couples were revealed, Ekin-Su entered the villa and was informed that in 24 hours, she would choose which boy she would like to steal.
- ^Note 2: On Day 2, Ekin-Su, who entered after the initial coupling, had to steal one boy for herself. She ultimately chose Curtis, leaving Kaz single
- ^Note 3: On Day 6, Tina was able to choose one boy she wanted to couple up with. She picked Scott, leaving India single and dumped.
- ^Note 4: On Day 8, Grace and Ron were able to choose an islander they would like to steal. They chose Luca and Kaz respectively.
- ^Note 5: On Day 9, the public voted for the most compatible couple. The couple with the fewest votes, Marcel and Olivia, were dumped from the island.
- ^Note 6: On Day 11, Harriett and Montel were able to choose an islander they would like to steal. They chose Ron and Kaz respectively.
- ^Note 7: On Day 14, the public voted for their favourite islanders. The islanders with the fewest votes, Kaz, Montel, Nas and Tina were all vulnerable and at risk of being dumped. It was then down to Elma and Luca, who received the most votes for favorite islander, to decide who to save. They ultimately decided to save Tina, leaving Kaz, Montel and Nas dumped from the island.
- ^Note 8: On Day 16, Danielle and Sammy were able to choose an islander they would like to steal. They chose Curtis and Elma respectively, leaving Ekin-Su and Ronnie single and vulnerable.
- ^Note 9: On Day 21, the public voted for who they wanted new islanders Chuggs and Samie to be coupled up with. They picked Danielle and Luca, leaving Grace and Tina single and vulnerable.
- ^Note 10: On Day 25, after receiving the most votes in the "To Be Honest" challenge, Chuggs and Tina, Curtis and Ekin-Su, and Harriett and Ronnie were all vulnerable and in danger of leaving the villa. Following a public vote, Chuggs and Tina were dumped from the island.
- ^Note 11: On Day 29, following a public vote, Harriett and Ronnie, Catherine and Omar, and Elma and Sammy were voted as the least compatible couples. On Day 30, the dumped islanders returned to the villa to decide who should be dumped. Harriett and Ronnie received the most votes and were ultimately dumped from island.
- ^Note 12: The public voted for which couple they think should win Love Island: All Stars. The couple with the most votes were declared the winners of Love Island: All Stars and received the grand prize money.

== Weekly summary ==
The main events in the Love Island villa are summarized in the table below.

Week 1	Entrances	On Day 1, Catherine, Curtis, Ekin-Su, Elma, Gabby, India, Kaz, Luca, Marcel, Nas, Olivia, Ronnie and Scott entered the villa.; On Day 2, Casey entered the villa.; On Day 5, Tina entered the villa.
Week 1	Coupling	On Day 1, following a public vote to decide the first couples of the series, Kaz was paired with Curtis, India coupled up with Scott, Catherine was chosen to be with Nas, Olivia was given Luca, Elma with Ronnie, and Gabby was picked to couple up with Marcel.; On Day 2, Ekin-Su, who entered after the initial coupling, had to steal one boy for herself. She ultimately chose Curtis, leaving Kaz single.; On Day 4, the islanders recoupled for the first time. As the newest islander, Casey chose first and decided to couple up with Gabby. Scott and India, Curtis and Ekin-Su, Nas and Catherine, and Ronnie and Elma all remained together, meanwhile Marcel chose Olivia, and Luca coupled up with Kaz.; On Day 7, new islander Tina got to choose which boy she would like to couple up with. She picked Scott, leaving India single and dumped.
Week 1	Challenges	On Day 1, the girls had to hand a red flag to one of the boys they thought was a "red flag" and explain their reasoning.; On Day 2, the islanders played a game where they had to pick a dare out of a box and complete what is written on the card.; On Day 5, the islanders played a game of suck and blow where they had to complete a truth or a dare.
Week 1	Dates	On Day 1, Ekin-Su was able to choose three boys to go on a date with. She chose Ronnie, Curtis and Scott.; On Day 5, Tina chose three boys to go on a date with before her official arrival to the villa. She picked Luca, Nas and Scott.
Week 1	Exits	On Day 6, new islander Tina got to choose which boy she would like to couple up with. She picked Scott, leaving India single and dumped.
Week 2	Entrances	On Day 7, Grace and Ron entered the villa.; On Day 10, Harriett and Montel entered the villa.
Week 2	Coupling	On Day 8, new islanders Grace and Ron were able to steal an islander of their choosing. Ron chose Kaz, while Grace chose Luca.; On Day 11, new islanders Harriett and Montel were able to steal an islander of their choosing. Harriett chose Ron, while Montel chose Kaz.
Week 2	Challenges	On Day 7, the islanders played a game of It's Giving Gifted where they had to open a gift box with a sash in it, read it out and give it to islander they think meets the description on it.; On Day 10, the islanders completed a challenge of Saucy Snog. Each boy was blindfolded and had headphones on while each girl kissed every boy. The boys then had to rate each kiss on a scale of 1-10. Ekin-Su was picked as the winner after receiving the highest score.; On Day 12, the islanders had a Vegas night where they played a game of roulette and had to do a truth or a dare depending on what the dice landed on.
Week 2	Dates	On Day 8, Curtis and Ekin-Su left the villa to go on their first date.
Week 2	Exits	On Day 9, after receiving the fewest public votes for the most compatible couple, Marcel and Olivia were dumped from the island.
Week 3	Entrances	On Day 14, Danielle and Sammy entered the villa.; On Day 17, Omar entered the villa.; On Day 19, Chuggs and Samie entered the villa.
Week 3	Coupling	On Day 16, new islanders Danielle and Sammy were able to steal an islander of their choosing. Sammy chose Elma, while Danielle chose Curtis.; On Day 17, the islanders recoupled. As the newest arrival, Omar was able to choose first and coupled up with Catherine. Luca and Grace, Casey and Gabby, Sammy and Elma, and Scott and Tina all remained together, while Ronnie picked Harriett, Curtis reunited with Ekin-Su, and Ron chose Danielle.
Week 3	Challenges	On Day 18, the boys and girls competed in a challenge where they had to raise their opposing team's heart rate. At the end of the game they found out who raised their heart rate the most.; On Day 20, the islanders played a game of Spin the Bottle Truth or Dare where the islanders had to spin a bottle and whichever islander it landed on had to pick a card and complete a truth or a dare on it.
Week 3	Dates	On Day 14, Danielle and Sammy were able to pick two islanders to have an overnight date with in the hideaway. They chose Curtis and Elma respectively.; On Day 17, Omar picked Catherine and Grace to go on a date.
Week 3	Exits	On Day 14, following a public voting for the viewer's favorite islander, Kaz, Montel, Nas and Tina were all vulnerable and at risk of being dumped. It was then down to Elma and Luca, who received the most votes for favorite islander, to decide who to save. They ultimately decided to save Tina, leaving Kaz, Montel and Nas dumped from the island.; On Day 18, Scott decided to voluntarily leave the villa.; On Day 19, Ron decided to voluntarily leave the villa.
Week 4	Coupling	On Day 21, the public voted for who they wanted new islanders Chuggs and Samie to be coupled up with. They chose Danielle and Luca.; On Day 27, the islanders recoupled. Ronnie and Harriett, Curtis and Ekin-Su, Omar and Catherine, Sammy and Elma, and Casey and Gabby all remained together, while Luca reunited with Grace, and Chuggs chose Tina, leaving Danielle and Samie single and dumped from the island.
Week 4	Challenges	On Day 22, the islanders competed in the "Snog, Marry, Pie" challenge where each islander had to snog, marry and pie an islander of the opposite gender.; On Day 24, the islanders competed in "To Be Honest" where a series of questions were asked and each couple had to pick who matched the question.
Week 4	Dates	On Day 22, Chuggs and Danielle, and Luca and Samie went on a double date.; On Day 23, Casey and Gabby left the villa to go on their first date.
Week 4	Exits	On Day 23, Danielle and Samie were dumped after failing to couple up.; On Day 25, after receiving the most votes in the "To Be Honest" challenge, Chuggs and Tina, Curtis and Ekin-Su, and Harriett and Ronnie were all vulnerable and in danger of leaving the villa. Following a public vote, Chuggs and Tina were dumped from the island.
Week 5	Challenges	On Day 28, the islanders took part in a talent show, after which they had to collectively decide who was the winner. They chose Curtis and Ekin-Su as a couple.
Week 5	Dates	On Day 29, the remaining couples each went on their final dates in the villa.
Week 5	Exits	On Day 30, following a public vote, Harriett and Ronnie, Catherine and Omar, and Elma and Sammy were voted as the least compatible couples. The dumped islanders returned to the villa to decide who should be dumped. Catherine and Omar did not receive any votes, whilst Ron, India, Marcel, Nas, and Kaz all voted for Elma and Sammy. Meanwhile, Olivia, Samie, Montel, Danielle, Chuggs and Tina all voted for Harriett and Ronnie, who were ultimately dumped from villa after receiving the most votes.; On Day 32, Elma and Sammy finished in fifth place and Catherine and Omar finished fourth, whilst Curtis and Ekin-Su finished third. Casey and Gabby were announced as the winners, leaving Grace and Luca as runners-up.

== Episodes ==
No. overall	No. in series	Title	Day(s)	Original release date	Prod. code
Week 1
37	1	"Episode 1"	Day 1	13 January 2025	201
38	2	"Episode 2"	Days 1–2	14 January 2025	202
39	3	"Episode 3"	Days 2–3	15 January 2025	203
40	4	"Episode 4"	Days 3–4	16 January 2025	204
41	5	"Episode 5"	Days 4–5	17 January 2025	205
42	6	"Episode 6: Unseen Bits"	N/A (Note: This episode showcased events from the previous days in the week. No new or present days were featured.)	18 January 2025	206
43	7	"Episode 7"	Days 5–6	19 January 2025	207
44	8	"Episode 8"	Days 6–7	20 January 2025	208
Week 2
45	9	"Episode 9"	Days 7–8	21 January 2025	209
46	10	"Episode 10"	Days 8–9	22 January 2025	210
47	11	"Episode 11"	Days 9–10	23 January 2025	211
48	12	"Episode 12"	Days 10–11	24 January 2025	212
49	13	"Episode 13: Unseen Bits"	N/A	25 January 2025	213
50	14	"Episode 14"	Days 11–12	26 January 2025	214
51	15	"Episode 15"	Days 12–13	27 January 2025	215
52	16	"Episode 16"	Days 13–14	28 January 2025	216
Week 3
53	17	"Episode 17"	Days 14–15	29 January 2025	217
54	18	"Episode 18"	Days 15–16	30 January 2025	218
55	19	"Episode 19"	Days 16–17	31 January 2025	219
56	20	"Episode 20: Unseen Bits"	N/A	1 February 2025	220
57	21	"Episode 21"	Days 17–18	2 February 2025	221
58	22	"Episode 22"	Days 18–19	3 February 2025	222
59	23	"Episode 23"	Days 19–20	4 February 2025	223
60	24	"Episode 24"	Days 20–21	5 February 2025	224
Week 4
61	25	"Episode 25"	Days 21–22	6 February 2025	225
62	26	"Episode 26"	Days 22–23	7 February 2025	226
63	27	"Episode 27: Unseen Bits"	N/A	8 February 2025	227
64	28	"Episode 28"	Days 23–24	9 February 2025	228
65	29	"Episode 29"	Days 24–25	10 February 2025	229
66	30	"Episode 30"	Days 25–26	11 February 2025	230
67	31	"Episode 31"	Days 26–27	12 February 2025	231
68	32	"Episode 32"	Days 27–28	13 February 2025	232
Week 5
69	33	"Episode 33"	Day 29	14 February 2025	233
70	34	"Episode 34: Unseen Bits"	N/A	15 February 2025	234
71	35	"Episode 35"	Days 29–30	16 February 2025	235
72	36	"Episode 36"	Days 30–32	17 February 2025	236

== Ratings ==
Official 7-day consolidated ratings in the table below are taken from Thinkbox and include +1, but exclude viewership on devices.

	Viewers (millions)					
	Week 1	Week 2	Week 3	Week 4	Week 5	Week 6
Sunday		1.52	1.55	1.62	1.78	1.64
Monday	1.21	1.50	1.56	1.56	1.56	1.42
Tuesday	1.69	1.49	1.58	1.71	1.59	
Wednesday	1.58	1.38	1.54	1.70	1.52	
Thursday	1.54	1.50	1.54	1.67	1.61	
Friday	1.55	1.70	1.63	1.64	1.55	
Weekly average	1.51	1.52	1.57	1.65	1.60	1.53
Running average	1.51	1.52	1.53	1.56	1.57	1.56
Series average	1.56					
Unseen Bits		0.36	0.43	0.40	0.37	0.28
