= Love Island: All Stars =

- Genre: Reality
- Created by: Brent Baker; Mark Busk-Cowley; Tom Gould; Joe Scarrat
- Written by: Iain Stirling; Mark Busk-Cowley; Steve Parry
- Creative directors: Richard Cowles; Tom Gould; Mike Spencer
- Presented by: Maya Jama (2024-2026); TBC (2027-)
- Starring: Love Island: All Stars contestants
- Narrated by: Iain Stirling
- Music by: Andrei Basirov; Toby Jarvis
- Country of origin: United Kingdom
- Original language: English
- No. of series: 3
- No. of episodes: 111

Production
- Executive producers: Richard Cowles; Tom Gould; Sarah Tyekiff; Becca Walker; Martin Oxley; Mandy Morris; Kat Lennox; Andy Cadman; Lauren Hicks; Mike Spencer; Iona MacKenzie; Oli Head; Louise Walls; Lewis Evans; Justin Saculles; Sophie Bush; Charlotte Smith
- Running time: 60–95 minutes (incl. adverts)
- Production company: GroupM Motion Entertainment

Original release
- Network: ITV2
- Release: 15 January 2024 – present

Related
- Celebrity Love Island; Love Island; Love Island (franchise)

Love Island: All Stars is a spin-off of the dating show Love Island featuring former contestants from previous series. It began airing on 15 January 2024 on ITV and ITV2. It was presented by Maya Jama until 2026, with a new host to be announced and has been narrated by Iain Stirling since its inception. The show is filmed in a villa in Franschhoek, South Africa, and to date, has aired for three series.

== History ==
In August 2023, after ITV had aired two series of Love Island in the same year for the first time, it was reported that the winter series had been axed for 2024 and that an "All Stars" version was set to serve as its replacement. Several rumours of an "All Stars" series being in development had been reported in various news outlets. In September 2023, the commissioning of Love Island: All Stars was officially announced by ITV. Filming is based in Franschhoek, South Africa, which was the former filming spot for the winter series.

Love Island has included returning contestants before, with Adam Collard, who was a contestant on the fourth series and Kady McDermott who was a contestant on the second series returning as "bombshells" in the eighth and tenth series of the show respectively. This series is the first to feature a line-up consisting of only returning contestants.

In May 2024, it was confirmed that the show would return for a second series that aired in 2025. In August 2025, it was confirmed that the show would return the following year. The third series was due to begin airing on 12 January 2026, however was postponed due to wildfires in South Africa. It eventually premiered three days later on 15 January 2026.

In November 2026, Maya Jama announced her exit from the series. A host for the upcoming fourth series, set to air in 2027, is yet to be announced.

== Format ==
Love Island involves a group of contestants, referred to as Islanders, living in isolation from the outside world in a villa in Mallorca, constantly under video surveillance. To survive in the villa the Islanders must be coupled up with another Islander, whether it be for love, friendship, or money, and the overall winning couple receives a combined £50,000. On the first day, the Islanders couple up for the first time based on first impressions, but over the duration of the series they are forced to "re-couple" where they can choose to remain in their current couple or swap partners.

Any Islander who remains single after a re-coupling is eliminated and dumped from the island. Islanders can also be eliminated via public vote, as throughout the series, the public can vote online for their favourite couple or contestant. Pairs who receive the fewest votes risk being eliminated. During the final week, the public vote towards which couple they want to win the series and therefore take home £50,000.

== Hosts ==
Hosts	Series		
Hosts	1	2	3
Maya Jama			
Iain Stirling (narrator)			

== Series overview ==
Series	Islanders	Days	Location	Host	Episodes	Originally released		Winners	Runners-up	Average viewers (millions)
Series	Islanders	Days	Location	Host	Episodes	First released	Last released	Winners	Runners-up	Average viewers (millions)
1	25	37	Franschhoek, South Africa	Maya Jama	36	15 January 2024	19 February 2024	Molly Smith & Tom Clare	Callum Jones & Jess Gale	1.71
2	24	32	Franschhoek, South Africa	Maya Jama	36	13 January 2025	17 February 2025	Casey O'Gorman & Gabby Allen	Grace Jackson & Luca Bish	1.56
3	26	34	Franschhoek, South Africa	Maya Jama	40	15 January 2026	23 February 2026	Ciaran Davies & Samie Elishi	Millie Court & Zac Woodworth	TBA
