= Love Island (2015 TV series) series 9 =

2023 series of Love Island

Love Island
- Series 9
- Presented by: Maya Jama
- No. of days: 58
- No. of contestants: 35
- Winners: Kai Fagan; Sanam Harrinanan
- Runners-up: Ron Hall; Lana Jenkins
- Companion show: Love Island: Aftersun
- No. of episodes: 49

Release
- Original network: ITV2
- Original release: 16 January – 13 March 2023

Series chronology
- ← Previous; Series 8 Next → Series 10

The ninth series of Love Island began broadcasting on 16 January 2023 to 13 March 2023 on ITV2. It is the second winter edition of the series and the first to be presented by Maya Jama, who took over from Laura Whitmore. Iain Stirling returned to narrate the series.

On 13 March 2023, the series was won by Kai Fagan and Sanam Harrinanan with 43.75% of the final vote, becoming the first couple formed during the Casa Amor twist to win the series. Lana Jenkins and Ron Hall finished as runners-up.

== Production ==
In June 2022, prior to the conclusion of the previous series, it was confirmed that the show would return for two series to be broadcast in 2023, with ITV announcing that the show would air a winter edition for the first time since 2020, and as in the sixth series, the ninth series would be filmed in Cape Town, South Africa. It was broadcast in January 2023. On 22 August 2022, Laura Whitmore announced she would be stepping down as presenter after three series. Citing her reasons for leaving, Whitmore said she had found "certain elements of the show very difficult" [...] and that flying back and forth to South Africa "conflicted with [her] new projects".

Following media speculation, ITV confirmed Maya Jama as the new presenter on 12 October. Upon her appointment as presenter, Jama said: "I’ve always been such a massive Love Island fan and I'm so excited to be hosting one of the nation's favourite shows! I can't wait to get into the villa to meet all of the Islanders." The winner of the previous series, Ekin-Su Cülcüloğlu, said she was approached to present the show, but turned it down due to other work commitments. However, a show insider denied the reports and claimed that Jama was the "first pick" to host the series.

The first trailer for the series aired on 26 December 2022, which featured a five-second clip of a spinning bejewelled pink velvet mechanical bull. A full-length trailer was released on 1 January 2023, which included host Jama riding the bull and teasing the series with the tagline "It's time to grab love by the horns, I'm ready, are you?". The series premiered on ITV2 on 16 January 2023, exclusively in the UK and was later available on Hulu in the US after two weeks of broadcast.

== Islanders ==
The original Islanders for the ninth series were announced on 9 January 2023, one week before the series launch. For the first time Love Island welcomed its first contestant with sight-loss. Ron Hall is a financial advisor who is blind in one eye as a result of a football injury he sustained when he was 8 years old.

On 12 January, it was announced that the public would decide the first "bombshell" of the series and a vote was opened for the viewers to choose between Ellie Spence, a 25-year-old business development executive from Norwich and Tom Clare, a 23-year-old semi-professional footballer from Barnsley. The winner of the vote, and therefore the first ''bombshell'' was Tom.

On 20 January, for the first time it was confirmed that the latest two "bombshells" would be islanders that have already previously appeared on the Australian version of the show. Aaron Waters, who had taken part in the third series, as well as Jessie Wynter who had appeared in the second series.

This series has become the first series since the third series where an islander has not walked or been removed from the villa.

Islander	Age	Hometown	Entered	Exited	Status	Ref
Kai Fagan	24	Manchester	Day 1	Day 58	Winner	
Sanam Harrinanan	24	Bedford	Day 29	Day 58	Winner	
Lana Jenkins	25	Luton	Day 1	Day 58	Runner-up	
Ron Hall	25	Essex	Day 1	Day 58	Runner-up	
Samie Elishi	23	Camden	Day 14	Day 58	Third place	
Tom Clare	23	Barnsley	Day 1	Day 58	Third place	
Shaq Muhammad	24	London	Day 1	Day 58	Fourth place	
Tanya Manhenga	23	Liverpool	Day 1	Day 58	Fourth place	
Jessie Wynter	26	Hobart, Australia	Day 7	Day 56	Dumped	
Will Young	23	Aylesbury	Day 1	Day 56	Dumped	
Casey O'Gorman	26	Tring	Day 17	Day 51	Dumped	
Rosie Seabrook	24	Bledlow Ridge	Day 39	Day 51	Dumped	
Claudia Fogarty	28	Blackburn	Day 23	Day 45	Dumped	
Keanan Brand	24	Wigan	Day 39	Day 45	Dumped	
Maxwell Samuda	23	London	Day 28	Day 45	Dumped	
Olivia Hawkins	27	Brighton	Day 1	Day 45	Dumped	
Martin Akinola	27	Dublin	Day 28	Day 40	Dumped	
Bayley Mummery	25	Addlestone	Day 28	Day 32	Dumped	
Cynthia Otseh-Taiwo	25	London	Day 29	Day 32	Dumped	
Frankie Davey	22	Ipswich	Day 28	Day 32	Dumped	
Kain Reed	21	Gateshead	Day 28	Day 32	Dumped	
Layla Al-Momani	28	London	Day 29	Day 32	Dumped	
Lydia Karakyriakou	22	Glasgow	Day 29	Day 32	Dumped	
Lynda Flix	22	Salford	Day 29	Day 32	Dumped	
Ryan Weekley	22	Nottingham	Day 28	Day 32	Dumped	
Sammy James	27	Leicester	Day 29	Day 32	Dumped	
Ellie Spence	25	Norwich	Day 10	Day 26	Dumped	
Jordan Odofin	28	London	Day 17	Day 26	Dumped	
Tanyel Revan	26	London	Day 1	Day 24	Dumped	
Aaron Waters	25	Melbourne, Australia	Day 7	Day 19	Dumped	
Spencer Wilks	24	Bournemouth	Day 10	Day 19	Dumped	
Zara Lackenby-Brown	25	London	Day 3	Day 16	Dumped	
Anna-May Robey	20	Swansea	Day 1	Day 9	Dumped	
Haris Namani	21	Doncaster	Day 1	Day 9	Dumped	
David Salako	24	Little Oakley	Day 3	Day 5	Dumped	

== Future appearances ==
In 2023, Haris Namani appeared on series 1 of Love Island Albania.

In 2024, Tom Clare and Casey O'Gorman appeared on series one of Love Island: All Stars.

In 2025, Samie Elishi, Ron Hall, Olivia Hawkins, and O'Gorman all returned for series two of Love Island: All Stars. O'Gorman also competed on season two of Love Island Games.

In 2026, Elishi and Shaq Muhammad returned for series three of Love Island: All Stars.

== Coupling and elimination history ==
	Week 1			Week 2		Week 3		Week 4			Week 5	Week 6	Week 7	Week 8			
	Day 1	Day 2	Day 5	Day 9	Day 10	Day 16	Day 19	Day 21	Day 24	Day 26	Day 32	Day 40	Day 45	Day 51	Day 56		Final
Kai	Tanyel		Anna-May	Vulnerable	Tanyel	Samie	Vulnerable	Olivia	Olivia	Vulnerable	Sanam	Sanam	Safe	Safe	Jessie & Will; Least compatible	Finalist	Winner (Day 58)
Sanam	Not in Villa										Kai	Kai	Safe	Safe	Jessie & Will; Least compatible	Finalist	Winner (Day 58)
Lana	Ron		Will	Safe	Aaron	Aaron	Immune	Casey	Ron	Safe	Ron	Ron	Safe	Safe	Jessie & Will; Least compatible	Finalist	Runner-up (Day 58)
Ron	Lana		Tanyel	Safe	Ellie	Tanyel	Safe	Tanyel	Lana	Safe	Lana	Lana	Safe	Safe	Jessie & Will; Least compatible	Finalist	Runner-up (Day 58)
Samie	Not in Villa					Kai	Immune	Tom	Tom	Vulnerable	Tom	Tom	Safe	Safe	Kai & Sanam; Least compatible	Finalist	Third place (Day 58)
Tom	Not in Villa	Olivia	Zara	Vulnerable	Zara	Ellie	Safe	Samie	Samie	Vulnerable	Samie	Samie	Safe	Safe	Kai & Sanam; Least compatible	Finalist	Third place (Day 58)
Shaq	Tanya		Tanya	Safe	Tanya	Tanya	Safe	Tanya	Tanya	Safe	Single	Tanya	Vulnerable	Vulnerable	Lana & Ron; Least compatible	Finalist	Fourth place (Day 58)
Tanya	Shaq		Shaq	Vulnerable	Shaq	Shaq	Immune	Shaq	Shaq	Safe	Martin	Shaq	Vulnerable	Vulnerable	Lana & Ron; Least compatible	Finalist	Fourth place (Day 58)
Jessie	Not in Villa			Anna-May & Haris to dump	Will	Will	Immune	Will	Will	Safe	Will	Will	Safe	Vulnerable	Lana & Ron; Least compatible	Eliminated	Dumped (Day 56)
Will	Olivia	Single	Lana	Safe	Jessie	Jessie	Safe	Jessie	Jessie	Safe	Jessie	Jessie	Safe	Vulnerable	Lana & Ron; Least compatible	Eliminated	Dumped (Day 56)
Casey	Not in Villa						Immune	Lana	Claudia	Safe	Claudia	Rosie	Vulnerable	Eliminated	Dumped (Day 51)		
Rosie	Not in Villa											Casey	Vulnerable	Eliminated	Dumped (Day 51)		
Claudia	Not in Villa								Casey	Safe	Casey	Keanan	Vulnerable	Dumped (Day 45)			
Keanan	Not in Villa											Claudia	Vulnerable	Dumped (Day 45)			
Maxwell	Not in Villa										Olivia	Olivia	Eliminated	Dumped (Day 45)			
Olivia	Will	Tom	Haris	Safe	Spencer	Spencer	Immune	Kai	Kai	Vulnerable	Maxwell	Maxwell	Eliminated	Dumped (Day 45)			
Martin	Not in Villa										Tanya	Single	Dumped (Day 40)				
Bayley	Not in Villa										Single	Dumped (Day 31)					
Cynthia	Not in Villa										Single	Dumped (Day 31)					
Frankie	Not in Villa										Single	Dumped (Day 31)					
Kain	Not in Villa										Single	Dumped (Day 31)					
Layla	Not in Villa										Single	Dumped (Day 31)					
Lydia	Not in Villa										Single	Dumped (Day 31)					
Lynda	Not in Villa										Single	Dumped (Day 31)					
Ryan	Not in Villa										Single	Dumped (Day 31)					
Sammy	Not in Villa										Single	Dumped (Day 31)					
Ellie	Not in Villa				Ron	Tom	Immune	Jordan	Jordan	Eliminated	Dumped (Day 26)						
Jordan	Not in Villa						Immune	Ellie	Ellie	Eliminated	Dumped (Day 26)						
Tanyel	Kai		Ron	Vulnerable	Kai	Ron	Immune	Ron	Single	Dumped (Day 24)							
Aaron	Not in Villa			Anna-May & Haris to dump	Lana	Lana	Vulnerable	Dumped (Day 19)									
Spencer	Not in Villa				Olivia	Olivia	Vulnerable	Dumped (Day 19)									
Zara	Not in Villa		Tom	Safe	Tom	Single	Dumped (Day 16)										
Anna-May	Haris		Kai	Vulnerable	Dumped (Day 9)												
Haris	Anna-May		Olivia	Vulnerable	Dumped (Day 9)												
David	Not in Villa		Single	Dumped (Day 5)													
Dumped	No; Dumping		David; Failed to couple up	Anna-May & Haris; Aaron & Jessie's choice to dump	No; Dumping	Zara; Failed to couple up	Aaron, Spencer; Girls' choice to dump	No; Dumping	Tanyel; Failed to couple up	Ellie & Jordan; Public's choice to dump	Bayley, Cynthia, Frankie, Kain, Layla, Lydia, Lynda, Ryan, Sammy; Failed to couple up	Martin; Failed to couple up	Maxwell & Olivia; Public's choice to dump	Casey & Rosie; Public's choice to dump	Jessie & Will; Public's choice to dump		Shaq & Tanya; 2.52% to win
Dumped	No; Dumping		David; Failed to couple up	Anna-May & Haris; Aaron & Jessie's choice to dump	No; Dumping	Zara; Failed to couple up	Aaron, Spencer; Girls' choice to dump	No; Dumping	Tanyel; Failed to couple up	Ellie & Jordan; Public's choice to dump	Bayley, Cynthia, Frankie, Kain, Layla, Lydia, Lynda, Ryan, Sammy; Failed to couple up	Martin; Failed to couple up	Maxwell & Olivia; Public's choice to dump	Casey & Rosie; Public's choice to dump	Jessie & Will; Public's choice to dump		Samie & Tom; 23.65% to win
Dumped	No; Dumping		David; Failed to couple up	Anna-May & Haris; Aaron & Jessie's choice to dump	No; Dumping	Zara; Failed to couple up	Aaron, Spencer; Girls' choice to dump	No; Dumping	Tanyel; Failed to couple up	Ellie & Jordan; Public's choice to dump	Bayley, Cynthia, Frankie, Kain, Layla, Lydia, Lynda, Ryan, Sammy; Failed to couple up	Martin; Failed to couple up	Claudia & Keanan; Maxwell & Olivia's choice to dump	Casey & Rosie; Public's choice to dump	Jessie & Will; Public's choice to dump		Lana & Ron; 30.08% to win
Dumped	No; Dumping		David; Failed to couple up	Anna-May & Haris; Aaron & Jessie's choice to dump	No; Dumping	Zara; Failed to couple up	Aaron, Spencer; Girls' choice to dump	No; Dumping	Tanyel; Failed to couple up	Ellie & Jordan; Public's choice to dump	Bayley, Cynthia, Frankie, Kain, Layla, Lydia, Lynda, Ryan, Sammy; Failed to couple up	Martin; Failed to couple up	Claudia & Keanan; Maxwell & Olivia's choice to dump	Casey & Rosie; Public's choice to dump	Jessie & Will; Public's choice to dump		Kai & Sanam; 43.75% to win

== Weekly summary ==
The main events in the Love Island villa are summarised in the table below.

Week 1	Entrances	On Day 1, Anna-May, Haris, Kai, Lana, Olivia, Ron, Shaq, Tanya, Tanyel, Tom and Will entered the villa.; On Day 3, David and Zara entered the villa.
Week 1	Coupling	On Day 1, the Islanders coupled up for the first time. After all of the boys entered, the girls were asked to choose a boy to pair up with. Anna-May coupled up with Haris, Lana paired up with Ron, Olivia with Will, Tanya with Shaq, and Tanyel with Kai.; On Day 2, Tom, who entered after the coupling, had to steal one girl for himself. He chose Olivia, leaving Will single.; On Day 5, the islanders recoupled for the first time with the girls picking which boy they'd like to be with. Tanya and Shaq remained together, meanwhile Anna-May chose Kai, Zara coupled up with Tom, Olivia went with Haris, Tanyel picked Ron, and Lana opted with Will. As David was the only boy not picked he was dumped from the island.
Week 1	Challenges	On Day 2, the girls and the boys competed against each other in "Dirty Laundry", in which they had to guess which islander a fact was about. To make their guess they had kiss the islander they believe is the answer.
Week 1	Dates	On Day 3, new islanders David and Zara each picked an islander to take on a date. David chose Tanya, whilst Zara dated Ron.
Week 1	Exits	On Day 5, David was dumped from the island after failing to couple up.
Week 2	Entrances	On Day 7, Aaron and Jessie entered the villa.; On Day 10, Ellie and Spencer entered the villa.
Week 2	Coupling	On Day 10, the islanders recoupled again with the boys picking which girl they'd like to be with. However, as new islanders, both Ellie and Spencer were given first choice. Ellie picked Ron, whilst Spencer coupled up with Olivia. As well as this, Shaq and Tanya, and Tom and Zara remained together, meanwhile Kai chose Tanyel, Will picked Jessie, and Aaron went with Lana.
Week 2	Challenges	On Day 9, the girls competed against each other in "Space Raunch", in which the boys picked which girl was the most "out of this world". Zara won the challenge.
Week 2	Dates	On Day 8, new islanders Aaron and Jessie each picked two islanders to take on a date. Aaron chose Olivia and Lana, whilst Jessie chose Will and Tom.; On Day 12, new islanders Ellie and Spencer each went on a date with their new partners, Ron and Olivia.
Week 2	Exits	On Day 9, after receiving the fewest public votes, Anna-May, Tanya and Tanyel, and Haris, Kai and Tom were in danger of being dumped. New islanders Aaron and Jessie then had to choose one boy and one girl to dump from the island. They chose Anna-May and Haris.
Week 3	Entrances	On Day 14, Samie entered the villa.; On Day 17, Casey and Jordan entered the villa.
Week 3	Coupling	On Day 16, the islanders recoupled again with the boys picking which girl they'd like to be with. Aaron and Lana, Shaq and Tanya, Spencer and Olivia, and Will and Jessie all remained together, meanwhile Kai chose Samie, Ron coupled up with Tanyel, and Tom went with Ellie. As Zara was the only girl not picked she was dumped from the island.
Week 3	Challenges	On Day 18, the girls competed in a snogging challenge. The girls kissed each boy in turn whilst the boys were blindfolded and gave them a score out of ten.
Week 3	Dates	On Day 15, Jessie and Will left the villa to go on a date.; On Day 17, new Islanders Casey and Jordan were asked to choose three other islanders to take on dates. Casey chose Lana, Olivia and Jessie, whilst Jordan picked Tanyel, Samie and Olivia.
Week 3	Exits	On Day 16, Zara was dumped from the island after failing to couple up.; On Day 19, after receiving the fewest public votes, Aaron, Kai and Spencer were in danger of being dumped. It was then up to the girls to choose one boy to save. They saved Kai, therefore dumping Aaron and Spencer.
Week 4	Entrances	On Day 23, Claudia entered the villa.
Week 4	Coupling	On Day 21, the islanders recoupled again with the girls picking which boy they'd like to be with. Jessie and Will, Tanyel and Ron, and Tanya and Shaq all remained together, meanwhile Ellie chose Jordan, Olivia coupled up with Kai, Samie went with Tom, and Lana picked Casey.; On Day 24, the islanders recoupled with the boys picking which girl they'd like to couple with. Will and Jessie, Shaq and Tanya, Kai and Olivia, Tom and Samie, Jordan and Ellie all remained together, meanwhile Casey chose Claudia, and Ron picked Lana. As Tanyel was the only girl not picked, she was dumped from the island.
Week 4	Challenges	On Day 22, the boys took part in a Gladiator themed game, "Ladiators". The girls then picked Shaq as the winner of the challenge.; On Day 23, the boys and girls went head-to-head to raise their opposing team's heart rate. At the end of the game they found out who raised their heart rate the most. During the challenge, Claudia entered the villa.
Week 4	Dates	On Day 24, new girl Claudia was able to take two boys on dates. She chose Casey and Tom.
Week 4	Exits	On Day 24, Tanyel was dumped from the island after failing to couple up.; On Day 26, Ellie and Jordan were dumped from the island after receiving fewest public votes for the most compatible couple.
Week 5	Entrances	On Day 28, Bayley, Frankie, Kain, Martin, Maxwell and Ryan entered Casa Amor.; On Day 29, Cynthia, Layla, Lydia, Lynda, Sammy and Sanam entered the villa.
Week 5	Coupling	On Day 32, the original Islanders were told that they would be re-coupling. They were only given the option to remain in their current couple or to choose one of the new Islanders. However, as the boys and the girls were living in separate villas, they were not aware of what the other one chose. If one decided to re-couple and the other did not, then they would be single but still remain on the island. If both re-coupled then they would both remain in the villa with their new partner, and any remaining single new islanders would be dumped. Casey and Claudia, Ron and Lana, Tom and Samie, and Will and Jessie remained together, whilst Kai picked Sanam, Olivia chose Maxwell, and Tanya coupled up with Martin. As Shaq chose not to recouple, he was now single. New islanders Bayley, Cynthia, Frankie, Kain, Layla, Lydia, Lynda, Ryan and Sammy were all dumped from the island after failing to couple up.
Week 5	Challenges	On Day 29, the Main Villa and Casa Amor competed in "Raunchy Races" where they had to complete a certain task quicker than the other villa. The game was won by the villa, therefore they won a party for that evening.
Week 5	Exits	On Day 32, new islanders Bayley, Cynthia, Frankie, Kain, Layla, Lydia, Lynda, Ryan and Sammy were dumped from the island after failing to couple up.
Week 6	Entrances	On Day 39, Keanan and Rosie entered the villa.
Week 6	Coupling	On Day 40, the islanders recoupled again with the girls picking which boy they'd like to be with. However, as new islanders, both Keanan and Rosie were given first choice. Keanan picked Claudia, whilst Rosie coupled up with Casey. As well as this, Jessie and Will, Lana and Ron, Olivia and Maxwell, Samie and Tom, and Sanam an Kai all remained together, meanwhile Tanya and Shaq reunited. This left Martin single and dumped from the island.
Week 6	Challenges	On Day 37, the islanders competed in a couple's quiz "Knowing Me, Knowing You", hosted by Shaq, where they had to answer questions about the person they are coupled up with.; On Day 38, the Islanders took part in Movie Night in a Boys vs Girls pub quiz challenge where they had to answer sex related questions. The team who answered correctly were able to select a movie from the list which featured a clip of another Islander.
Week 6	Dates	On Day 36, Kai and Sanam left the villa to go on their first date.; On Day 39, ahead of entering the villa, new Islanders Keanan and Rosie each chose two islanders to take on dates. Keanan chose Jessie and Samie, whilst Rosie picked Casey and Kai.
Week 6	Exits	On Day 40, Martin was dumped from the island after failing to couple up.
Week 7	Challenges	On Day 42, the boys and girls went head-to-head in "Saints vs Sinners" with the girls transforming into angels, and the boys becoming devils.; On Day 43, the islanders competed in the "Snog, Marry, Pie" challenge where each islander had to snog, marry and pie an islander of the opposite gender.; On Day 46, the islanders split into two teams and competed against each other in a number of sports day events.; On Day 47, the islanders were asked to predict where the public ranked them in a series of categories.
Week 7	Exits	On Day 45, Maxwell and Olivia were dumped from the island after receiving fewest public votes for the most compatible couple. It was then down to Maxwell and Olivia to choose another couple to dump. They chose Claudia and Keanan.
Week 8	Challenges	On Day 50, the islanders took part in a talent contest.; On Day 51, the couples competed in "Cocktail Shake-up" where they had to transfer their cocktails across a slip and slide using an empty tray of glasses strapped to their heads. Kai and Sanam won the challenge.; On Day 52, the couples were challenged with becoming parents and looking after a doll. The challenge was won by Tom and Samie.
Week 8	Dates	On Day 53, Ron and Lana, Tom and Samie, and Shaq and Tanya went on their final dates.; On Day 54, Will and Jessie, and Kai and Sanam went on their final dates.
Week 8	Exits	On Day 51, Casey and Rosie were dumped from the island after receiving fewest public votes for the most compatible couple.
Week 9	Exits	On Day 56, following the islanders votes for their least compatible couple, Kai and Sanam, Ron and Lana and Will and Jessie, who all received votes went head-to-head with each other in a public vote. It was then revealed that having received the most public votes, Will and Jessie had been dumped.; On Day 58, Shaq and Tanya finished in fourth place and Tom and Samie finished third. Kai and Sanam were then voted the winners, leaving Ron and Lana as runners-up.

== Ratings ==
Official ratings are taken from BARB. Because the Saturday episodes are "Unseen Bits" episodes rather than nightly highlights, these are not included in the overall averages. Viewing figures are consolidated 7-day viewing figures with pre-broadcast viewing and viewing on tablets, PCs and smartphones included.

	Viewers (millions)								
	Week 1	Week 2	Week 3	Week 4	Week 5	Week 6	Week 7	Week 8	Week 9
Sunday		1	2	3	4	2.87	6	7	8
Monday	3.38	2	3	3.01	5	6	7	8	9
Tuesday	3.11	2	3	2.95	5	6	7	8	
Wednesday	1	2	3	4	5	6	7	8	
Thursday	1	2	2.90	4	5	6	7	8	
Friday	1	2	3	4	2.89	6	7	8	
Series average	N/A								

=== Notes ===
- ^Note 1:This episode wasn’t included in the weekly Top 50 ratings and was watched by Under 2.93m viewers.
- ^Note 2:This episode wasn’t included in the weekly Top 50 ratings and was watched by Under 2.95m viewers.
- ^Note 3:This episode wasn’t included in the weekly Top 50 ratings and was watched by Under 2.90m viewers.
- ^Note 4:This episode wasn’t included in the weekly Top 50 ratings and was watched by Under 2.94m viewers.
- ^Note 5:This episode wasn’t included in the weekly Top 50 ratings and was watched by Under 2.73m viewers.
- ^Note 6:This episode wasn’t included in the weekly Top 50 ratings and was watched by Under 2.79m viewers.
- ^Note 7:This episode wasn’t included in the weekly Top 50 ratings and was watched by Under 2.73m viewers.
- ^Note 8:This episode wasn’t included in the weekly Top 50 ratings and was watched by Under 2.95m viewers.
- ^Note 9:This episode wasn’t included in the weekly Top 50 ratings and was watched by Under 2.73m viewers.
