= Samie Elishi =

English television personality (born 2000)

- Born: Samie Caroline W. Elishi; 15 February 2000 (age 26); Islington, London, England
- Occupation: Television personality
- Years active: 2023–present
- Known for: Love Island; Love Island: All Stars

Samie Caroline W. Elishi (born 15 February 2000) is an English television personality, known for appearing as a contestant on the ninth series of the ITV2 dating show Love Island in 2023 and the second series and third series of Love Island: All Stars in 2025 and 2026, winning the latter.

== Life and career ==
Samie Caroline W. Elishi was born on 15 February 2000 in Islington, London to a Moroccan father and an English-Welsh mother. Prior to appearing on television, Elishi worked as a senior estate agent coordinator. In January 2023, she became a contestant on the ninth series of the ITV2 reality series Love Island. She entered the villa as a "bombshell" on Day 12, and during the series was coupled up with Kai Fagan and Tom Clare, the latter of whom she reached the final alongside and finished in third place. They entered a relationship during the show, however announced their split in April 2023. In May 2023, Elishi underwent tests for thyroid cancer after Love Island viewers spotted a lump on her neck during her time in the villa. She subsequently had the lump removed and was ultimately informed it was a benign tumour and was not cancerous.

In February 2025, it was announced that Elishi would return to Love Island, two years after her original appearance, to appear as a contestant on the second series of Love Island: All Stars. She again entered the villa as a "bombshell" on Day 22 of the series alongside Chuggs Wallis. She returned a year later for the third series, entering as a bombshell on Day 3 and ultimately winning the show with Ciaran Davies. The couple announced the end of their relationship just three weeks after the final. The same year, she began a relationship with fellow former Love Island contestant Tyrique Hyde, and in October 2026, announced they were expecting their first child together.

== Filmography ==
As herself
Year	Title	Notes	Ref.
2023	Love Island	Contestant; series 9	
2025	Love Island: All Stars	Contestant; series 2	
2026	Love Island: All Stars	Winner; series 3	
