= Demi Jones =

English television personality (born 1998)

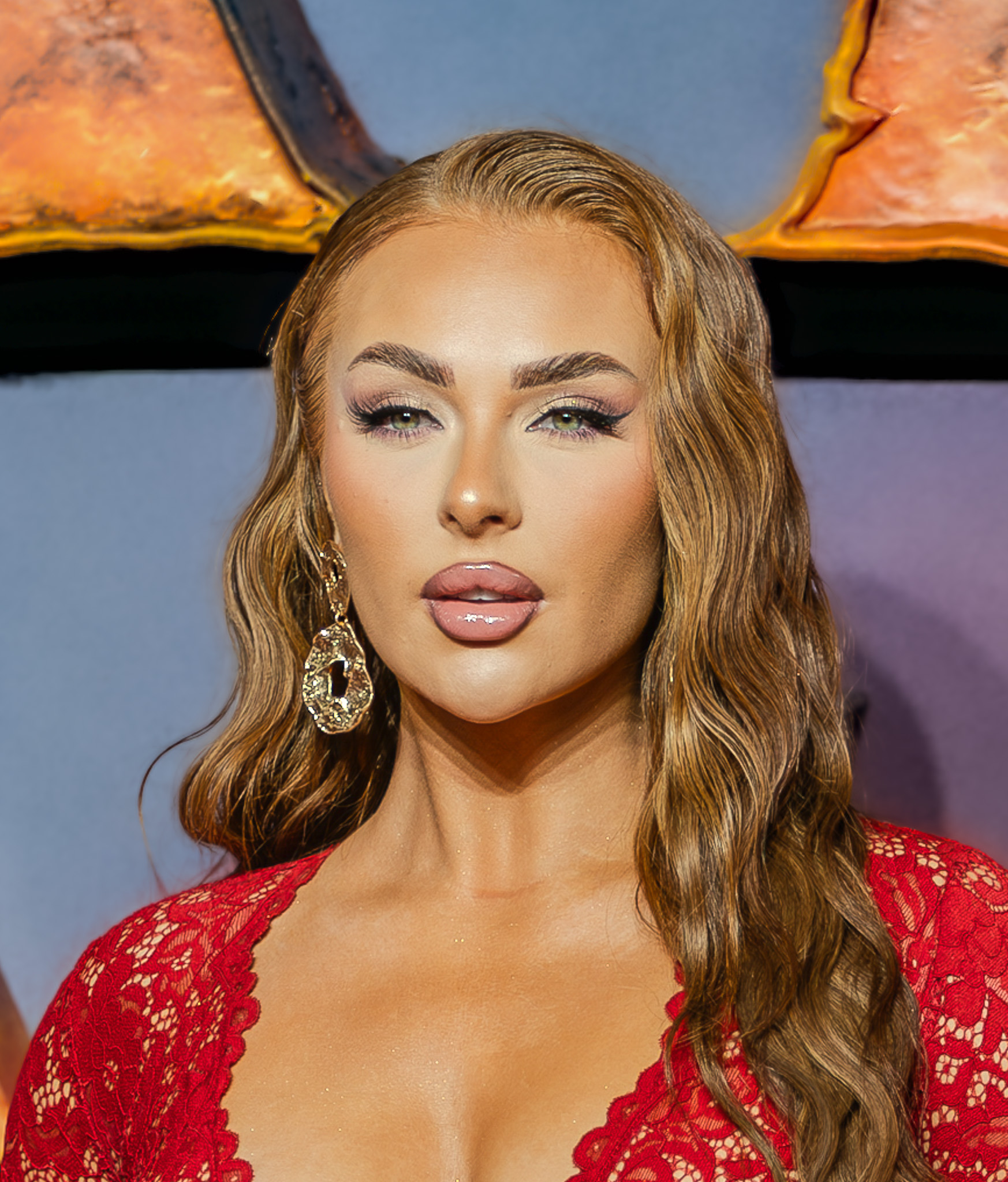
- Jones in 2025
- Born: 2 July 1998 (age 27); Portsmouth, Hampshire, England
- Occupation: Television personality
- Years active: 2020–present
- Known for: Love Island; The Real Full Monty; Love Island: All-Stars

Demi Jones (born 2 July 1998) is an English television personality. In 2020, she was a contestant on the sixth series of the ITV2 reality series Love Island and finished in third place. After being diagnosed with thyroid cancer, she signed up for The Real Full Monty in 2021. She returned to compete in the spin-off series Love Island: All-Stars in 2024.

== Life and career ==
Demi Jones was born on 2 July 1998 in Portsmouth, Hampshire. Prior to appearing on television, she studied history and archaeology at the University of Winchester and worked as a style advisor at a fashion boutique. In January 2020, Jones entered the Love Island villa as a contestant on the sixth series. She entered as a "bombshell" on Day 16 alongside Wallace Wilson. During the series, she was coupled up with Nas Majeed and Luke Mabbott, the latter of whom she reached final with and finished in third place. They dated for three months after the series ended, however Jones confirmed that they had split during the COVID-19 pandemic.

In May 2021, Jones announced that she had been diagnosed with thyroid cancer. She had to undergo surgery to have her thyroid removed. In December 2021, following her diagnosis, she took part in the ITV series Strictly The Real Full Monty in which a group of celebrities strip to raise awareness for cancer. Later that month, Jones announced that she was "cancer free" and said that despite it being a "difficult year mentally and physically for [her] with [her] surgeries and treatment" [...] said she was "beyond grateful for everyone's kindness and support". Queen Alexandra Hospital, where Jones received her cancer treatment revealed that following the announcement of Jones' diagnosis, cancer screenings had increased. Former Hollyoaks actress Abi Phillips credited Jones' cancer journey for helping her discover her own diagnosis.

In January 2024, Jones returned to Love Island four years after her original appearance to compete in the spin-off Love Island: All-Stars. Jones entered the villa as an original islander on Day 1.

== Filmography ==
As herself
Year	Title	Role	Ref.
2020	Love Island	Contestant; series 6	
2021	Strictly The Real Full Monty	Participant	
2024	Love Island: All-Stars	Contestant	
