= Jessie Wynter =

Australian social media personality (born 1996)

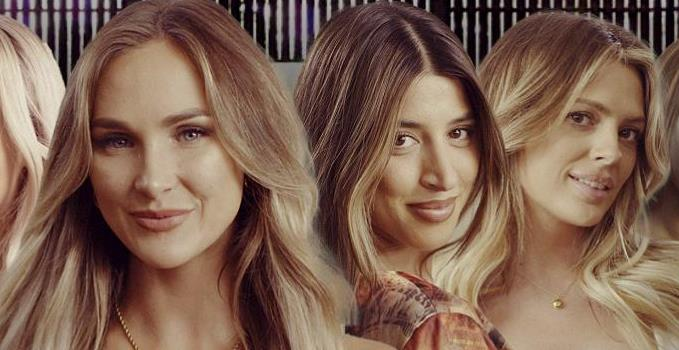
- Wynter, Shannon Singh, and Danielle Sellers in 2022
- Born: 28 September 1996 (age 30); Tasmania, Australia
- Occupations: Model; television personality
- Years active: 2019–present
- Known for: Love Island; Love Island: All Stars

Jessie Renee Wynter (born 28 September 1996) is a social media personality and reality television participant from Hobart in Tasmania. She appeared on the second series of Love Island Australia in 2019, the winter 2023 run of the British version, and on the OFTV agriculture show Model Farmers. She was also a finalist in the 2019 edition of Miss Universe Australia.

== Life and career ==
Jessie Renee Wynter was born 28 September 1996 and is from Hobart in Tasmania. She was diagnosed with body dysmorphia aged 19 and had to give up a job in banking due to the effects of an eating disorder. In 2019, she reached that year's finals of Miss Universe Australia and appeared on the second series of Love Island Australia. At the time of the latter, she was working as a waitress for the Pub Banc Group. While on the programme, she dated Maurice Salib, Eoghan Murphy, Gerard Majda, and then Todd Elton, with whom she finished fourth and remained in a relationship for around three months. She later created the podcast Just Winging It with Jessie.

In 2022, Wynter, fellow Love Island alumni Shannon Singh and Danielle Sellers, and three other models learned how to run a dairy farm for Model Farmers, a reality series aired on OFTV, a derivative of OnlyFans created as part of efforts to diversify into non-explicit content. At the time, all six participants were on OnlyFans. The following January, she and Aaron Waters from different series of Love Island Australia joined that winter's cast of the British version of Love Island as bombshells, becoming the first international contestants to do so. While on the programme, searches for "Love Island Australia Jessie before surgery" increased by 70% as part of a theme that also affected that series's Tanyel Revan and previous series's Faye Winter, Megan Barton-Hanson, and Ekin-Su Cülcüloğlu.

Wynter coupled up with Will Young while on Love Island, who cheated on her during that series's Casa Amor and enlisted the entire villa to read out things he loved about her in an effort to win her back. The pair ultimately finished fifth and were the last couple to be dumped during their series; their departure was spoiled by the host Maya Jama on her Instagram story and by an advert for Love Island: Aftersun that aired during the programme. Within a year of their departure from the series, Wynter had moved into Young's Buckinghamshire farm and had suffered an eating disorder relapse; she has credited professional help and the Love Island production team for her recovery.

Jessie and Will have made their debut movie appearance in The Worst Film Festival Ever |url=https://WWW.IMDB.COM/title/tt27720675/ The story of recently dumped filmmaker, who dreams of producing his own movies, but when his father suffers a heart attack, he is forced into running the Bargain basement Film Festival that his father uses as a cynical money maker. Jessie and Will both play themselves as Celebrities at the festival.
