= Stage School Australia =

Melbourne-based performing arts training provider for young people

Information
- Other names: Australian Youth Theatre (AYT); Young Australian Broadway Chorus (YABC); Australian Boys Dance Academy (ABDA)
- Former names: Victorian Youth Theatre (VYT); Children's Performing Company of Australia (CPCA)
- Established: 1984
- Faculty: 200+
- Website: stageschool.com.au

Stage School Australia is a performing arts training organisation for young people founded in 1984. Based in Melbourne and Brisbane, its performing arm is known as the Young Australian Broadway Chorus. The school also operates the Australian Boys Dance Academy. Classes are offered for children as young as 4 years of age, up to age 18.

== History ==
Young Australian Broadway Chorus
- Type: Theatre group
- Location(s): Melbourne and Brisbane, Australia
- Website: stageschool.com.au/course/yabc/

Established in 1984 in Melbourne, the group was known as the Victorian Youth Theatre (VYT) for many years. It later became known as the Children's Performing Company of Australia (CPCA). It has operated as Stage School Australia since 2014.

In 1999, the school's performing ensembles became known as the Young Australian Broadway Chorus (YABC). Recognised by The Age as "Melbourne's leading musical-theatre training organisation", the YABC offers classes in singing, dancing, and acting, and stages several shows a year. Many YABC alumni have gone on to pursue professional careers.

In response to strong interest from the community, the school opened the Australian Boys Dance Academy (ABDA) in 2014. In the early years, its motto was "No tutus. No tights. We dance in pants." The ABDA offers classes in hip-hop, jazz, and tap dance.

In 2022, Stage School Australia expanded to Brisbane. According to the school, as of 2025, it operates across 30 venues across Melbourne and Brisbane, with more than 200 teachers and over 5,800 students. The organisation also hires out its stage sets, props, and costumes for external shows.

As of 2025, the artistic director is Robert Coates, who started working for Stage School in 1995, and has directed most major YABC productions.

== Productions ==
Stage School Australia students perform at least twice a year. The Young Australian Broadway Chorus students perform in professionally staged productions, and can audition for school holiday productions and tours.

In 2010, the Young Australian Broadway Chorus performed Pure Imagination at the National Theatre in St Kilda, Melbourne. The show featured musical theatre classic songs from Willy Wonka and the Chocolate Factory, Oliver!, Guys and Dolls, and Wicked.

In 2011, YABC acquired the rights to stage the Broadway musical Spring Awakening. A cast with 24 members, all between the ages of 16 and 18, performed the full 2-hour musical at the National Theatre in St. Kilda, with signed permission from their parents.

In 2016, a cast of 74 performers from YABC appeared in the school's production of Disney's Beauty and the Beast at the University of Melbourne Union Theatre.

Stage School Australia's first production in Brisbane was The Wizard of Oz at the Draney Theatre, Ashgrove in 2024. In April 2025, it is staging the musical Seussical, also at the Draney Theatre. A review in The Scoop called it "a joyful, high-energy celebration of imagination".

=== Tours ===
Since 1996, Stage School Australia has conducted tours in Australia and internationally to countries including France, Germany, Italy, Singapore, the United Kingdom, and the United States.

In 1999, 15 performers from the Victorian Youth Theatre went on a three-week tour in the United States, with performances at venues including Disneyworld in Florida and the Lincoln Center in New York.

In 2010, 40 performers from the YABC performed at the Adelaide Fringe festival. A review in The Advertiser called their Broadway Junior Collection musical "fabulous", presenting "a torrent of foot-tapping big numbers, some good solo spots to showcase rising star material, some spirited dance routines and a bit of a story".

== Notable alumni ==
- Actor Deniz Akdeniz was discovered while performing with the Victorian Youth Theatre and was offered a role in the Disney Channel's As the Bell Rings.
- Actor Darcy Bryce, best known for his role in Furiosa: A Mad Max Saga, is a Triple Threat alumnus of YABC.
- Actor and media personality Maria Thattil, who was crowned Miss Universe Australia 2020, trained at Stage School Australia as a teen.
- Actor Samantha Tolj, best known for her role as police constable Kelly O'Rourke on the television series Blue Heelers, was enrolled in weekend and holiday workshops at Victorian Youth Theatre for six years from age 10.
- Film and television actor Alex Tsitsopoulos trained at Victorian Youth Theatre.
- Actor Matthew Werkmeister who played Zeke on Neighbours trained with Children's Performing Company of Australia.
