= The Real Full Monty =

British television series

- Presented by: Ashley Banjo; Coleen Nolan
- Country of origin: United Kingdom
- Original language: English
- No. of series: 6
- No. of episodes: 10

Production
- Camera setup: Multi-camera

Original release
- Network: ITV
- Release: 15 June 2017 – 12 December 2023

The Real Full Monty is a series of British television specials that began airing on ITV on 15 June 2017. The series airs annual specials that feature celebrities stripping to raise money for cancer charities. Ashley Banjo appears in every special to coach the celebrities and choreograph. Since 2018, local versions of the franchise have also been produced in Australia, Italy and Spain, with a United States version planned for release in 2024. On 30 September 2024, ITV announced that the show had been cancelled and will not return.

== Production ==
In 2017, ITV announced the commissioning of The Real Full Monty. A television special in which a group of male celebrities would be stripping to raise awareness for cancer and money for charity. In 2018, the show aired a Ladies Night special. The show has since aired one-off specials annually, with several of the episodes being themed around television shows including Dancing on Ice and Strictly Come Dancing.

== Series overview ==
=== The Real Full Monty (2017) ===
The first episode, titled The Real Full Monty aired on 15 June 2017 featuring eight male celebrities.

Celebrity	Known for
Alexander Armstrong	Actor & television presenter
Danny John-Jules	Stage & screen actor
Dominic Littlewood	Journalist & television presenter
Elliott Wright	The Only Way Is Essex star
Harry Judd	McFly drummer
Mark Foster	Former Olympic swimmer
Matthew Wolfenden	Emmerdale actor
Wayne Sleep	Dancer & choreographer

=== The Real Full Monty and The Real Full Monty: Ladies' Night (2018) ===
The Real Full Monty and The Real Full Monty: Ladies' Night aired on 28 and 29 March 2018.

Celebrity	Known for
Ainsley Harriott	Chef & television presenter
Alexander Armstrong	Actor & television presenter
Coleen Nolan	Singer & Loose Women panellist
Helen Lederer	Actress & comedian
James "Arg" Argent	The Only Way Is Essex star
Jeff Brazier	Television presenter
John Hartson	Former Wales footballer & pundit
John Partridge	Former EastEnders actor
Megan McKenna	Television personality & singer
Michelle Heaton	Former Liberty X singer
Ruth Madoc	Hi-de-Hi! actress
Sally Dexter	Stage & screen actress
Sarah-Jane Crawford	Television & radio presenter
Tom Parker	The Wanted singer
Ugo Monye	Former England rugby player & pundit
Victoria Derbyshire	Journalist & television presenter

=== The All New Monty: Who Bares Wins (2019) ===
The All New Monty: Who Bares Wins aired on 6 and 7 May 2019.

Celebrity	Known for
Coleen Nolan	Singer & Loose Women panellist
Crissy Rock	Benidorm actress & comedian
Danielle Armstrong	The Only Way Is Essex star
Gorka Márquez (Note: Márquez pulled out before the show due to an injury. He was replaced by Matt Evers.)	Strictly Come Dancing professional
Jack Fincham	Love Island winner
Jason Cundy	Former footballer
Joe Pasquale	Comedian
Kelvin Fletcher	Former Emmerdale actor & racing driver
Laurie Brett	Former EastEnders & Waterloo Road actress
Lisa Maffia	Former So Solid Crew singer
Martina Navratilova	Former tennis player
Matt Evers	Dancing on Ice professional
Megan Barton Hanson	Love Island finalist
Rav Wilding	Television presenter
Victoria Derbyshire	Journalist & television presenter
Willie Thorne	Former snooker player

=== The Real Full Monty on Ice (2020) ===
The Real Full Monty on Ice featured two specials aired on 14 and 15 December 2020, themed around Dancing on Ice.

Celebrity	Known for
Bob Champion	Former jump jockey
Chris Hughes	Love Island finalist
Gareth Thomas	Former Wales rugby player
Hayley Tamaddon	Former Emmerdale & Coronation Street actress
Jake Quickenden	Singer & reality television star
Jamie Lomas	Hollyoaks actor
Jenni Murray	Journalist & broadcaster
Linda Lusardi	Model & actress
Perri Kiely	Diversity dancer
Shaughna Phillips	Love Island contestant
Zoe Williams	Television doctor

=== Strictly The Real Full Monty (2021) ===
Strictly The Real Full Monty featured two specials aired on 13 and 14 December 2021, themed around Strictly Come Dancing.

Celebrity	Known for
Brenda Edwards	Singer & Loose Women panellist
Christine McGuinness	Model & The Real Housewives of Cheshire star
Colin Jackson	Former Olympic hurdler
Demi Jones	Love Island finalist
Duncan James	Blue singer & actor
James Jordan	Former Strictly Come Dancing professional
Laila Morse	Former EastEnders actress
Martin Roberts	Homes Under the Hammer presenter
Ola Jordan	Former Strictly Come Dancing professional
Teddy Soares	Love Island finalist

=== The Real Full Monty: Jingle Balls (2023) ===
The Real Full Monty returned for a new series in December 2023. Coleen Nolan returned alongside Banjo to coach the celebrities.

Celebrity	Known for
Ashley Cain	Former footballer
Ben Cohen	Former England rugby player
Ella Vaday	Drag queen & RuPaul's Drag Race UK finalist
Gemma Collins	Media personality & businesswoman
Julia Bradbury	Television presenter
Paul Burrell	Former Royal Household butler & author
Pete Wicks	Former The Only Way Is Essex star
Sherrie Hewson	Actress & television personality
Vanessa Bauer	Dancing on Ice professional
Victoria Ekanoye	Former Coronation Street actress

== Reception ==
The Real Full Monty was ranked 3 out of 5 stars by Michael Hogan of the Daily Telegraph, who described the 2018 special as not being "the slickest production" adding that "hats fell off, red G-strings malfunctioned, and awkward pauses occurred". However noted that the special was "whole-hearted" and [struck] the right balance between worthy and entertaining". Barbara Ellen of The Guardian described The Real Full Monty: Ladies Night as "brave", but argued that the message a female charity striptease [sent] out was "complicated and unhelpful". The Real Full Monty on Ice was described as an "excellent cause" by Carol Midgley of The Times.

== International versions ==
The TV format created in the United Kingdom, was exported in four countries around the world.

Country	Name	Host(s)	Network	Year aired
Australia	The Real Full Monty	Shane Jacobson	Seven Network	2018–2020
Italy	Nudi per la vita	Mara Maionchi	Rai 2	2022
Spain	Desnudos por la vida	Jesús Vázquez	Telecinco	2023
United States	The Real Full Monty	Anthony Anderson	Fox	2024

Versions have also sold in the Netherlands, Belgium, France, Germany and other countries.
