= Miss Universe Australia 2019 =

Beauty pageant edition

- Date: June 27, 2019
- Presenters: Ash Williams; Olivia Wells
- Venue: Sofitel Melbourne on Collins, Melbourne, Victoria
- Entrants: 28
- Placements: 15
- Winner: Priya Serrao; Victoria

Miss Universe Australia 2019, the 15th edition of the Miss Universe Australia pageant, was held on June 27, 2019, at Sofitel Melbourne on Collins, Melbourne, Victoria. crowned Priya Serrao of Victoria at the end of the event. Serrao represented Australia at Miss Universe 2019, but was unplaced.

== Results ==
=== Placements ===
Placement	Contestant
Miss Universe Australia 2019	Victoria – Priya Serrao
1st Runner-Up	Western Australia –
2nd Runner-Up	Victoria – Marijana Radmanović
3rd Runner-Up	Western Australia – Julia Edwards
4th Runner-Up	Queensland – Madeline Cowe
Top 10	Capital Territory – Veena Wijewickrema; New South Wales – Lilly Moreau; Queensland – Isabella Epstein; South Australia – Hànni Rose Howe; Victoria – Danielle Collis
Top 15	New South Wales – Claire Elizabeth Parker; New South Wales – Rosy Mae Reilly; Queensland – Monica Przybylek; South Australia – Jessica Dover; Tasmania – Jessie Wynter

=== Special awards ===
Award	Contestant
Miss Amity	New South Wales – Claire Elizabeth Parker
Miss Photogenic	New South Wales – Claire Elizabeth Parker

== Official Delegates ==
Meet the 28 national delegates competing for the title of Miss Universe Australia 2019:

States/Territories	Contestant	Age	Height	Hometown
Victoria	Eleanor Baillieu	24	1.88 m (6 ft 2 in)	Melbourne
New South Wales	Veronica Cloherty	26	1.70 m (5 ft 7 in)	Sydney
South Australia	Nicole Kelly Cocks	25	1.74 m (5 ft 8 1/2 in)	Adelaide
Victoria	Danielle Jaimi Collis	25	1.69 m (5 ft 6 1/2 in)	Melbourne
Queensland	Madeline Cowe	26	1.79 m (5 ft 10 1/2 in)	Brisbane
South Australia	Jessica Ellen Dover	26	1.73 m (5 ft 8 in)	Adelaide
South Australia	Alexandra Duggan	22	1.73 m (5 ft 8 in)	Adelaide
Western Australia	Julia Edwards	21	1.74 m (5 ft 8 1/2 in)	Perth
Queensland	Isabella Epstein	21	1.65 m (5 ft 5 in)	Brisbane
Western Australia	Justine Heron	21	1.68 m (5 ft 6 in)	Perth
New South Wales	Diana Hills	21	1.80 m (5 ft 11 in)	Central Coast
Queensland	Johanna Holzmann	23	1.74 m (5 ft 8 1/2 in)	Brisbane
South Australia	Hànni Rose Howe	19	1.78 m (5 ft 10 in)	Adelaide
Victoria	Brooke McAuley	26	1.79 m (5 ft 10 1/2 in)	Melbourne
Victoria	Tyra McNeill	20	1.79 m (5 ft 10 1/2 in)	Melbourne
New South Wales	Lilly Moreau	18	1.69 m (5 ft 6 1/2 in)	Central Coast
New South Wales	Claire Elizabeth Parker	27	1.70 m (5 ft 7 in)	Sydney
Victoria	Ariel Ploszaj-Russell	18	1.68 m (5 ft 6 in)	Melbourne
Queensland	Monica Przybylek	20	1.70 m (5 ft 7 in)	Gold Coast
Queensland	Kate Radin	21	1.78 m (5 ft 10 in)	Gold Coast
Victoria	Marijana Radmanović	27	1.78 m (5 ft 10 in)	Melbourne
New South Wales	Rosy Mae Reilly	23	1.78 m (5 ft 10 in)	Sydney
New South Wales	Tasha Laraine Ross	22	1.80 m (5 ft 11 in)	Sydney
Victoria	Priya Serrao	26	1.70 m (5 ft 7 in)	Melbourne
Western Australia	Isabel Stewart-Kasimba	20	style="text-align:center;" |1.74 m (5 ft 8 1/2 in)	Perth
Western Australia	Shivon Sweet	22	1.79 m (5 ft 10 1/2 in)	Perth
Capital Territory	Veena Wijewickrema	19	1.79 m (5 ft 10 1/2 in)	Canberra
Tasmania	Jessie Renée Wynter	22	1.76 m (5 ft 9 1/2 in)	Hobart
