= Aaron Simpson (footballer, born 1997) =

Recruitment Consultant

Personal information
- Date of birth: 7 March 1997 (age 29)
- Place of birth: Canterbury, England
- Position: Full back

Team information
- Current team: Gainsborough Trinity

Youth career
- –2014: Whitstable Town
- 2014–2015: Maidstone United
- 2015–2017: Wolverhampton Wanderers

Senior career*
Years	Team	Apps	(Gls)
2014–2015	Maidstone United	9	(0)
2017–2018	Wolverhampton Wanderers	0	(0)
2017	→ Portsmouth (loan)	0	(0)
2017	→ AFC Telford United (loan)	13	(0)
2018	→ Kilmarnock (loan)	4	(0)
2018	→ FC Jumilla (loan)	6	(0)
2019	Waterford	8	(0)
2019–2020	Dover Athletic	20	(0)
2020–2021	Sutton United	12	(1)
2021–2022	Hemel Hempstead Town	10	(0)
2022–2023	Chippenham Town	6	(0)
2023–2024	Salisbury	27	(2)
2024–	Gainsborough Trinity	39	(0)

International career
2014	England U18 Schoolboys		
- * Club domestic league appearances and goals as of 19:51, 13 July 2025 (UTC)

Aaron Simpson (born 7 March 1997) is an English footballer who currently plays as a full back for Gainsborough Trinity. He has previously played for Maidstone United and on loan at Portsmouth, AFC Telford United, Kilmarnock and FC Jumilla.

In 2021, he was a contestant on the seventh series of Love Island.

== Career ==
=== Maidstone United ===
Simpson began his career at Maidstone United. For the first half of the 2014–15 season, Simpson featured for Maidstone eight times in the league and five times in the FA Cup as Maidstone, then of the Isthmian League beat league opposition in Stevenage to set up a second round proper tie with Wrexham. Maidstone lost this match 3–1 and Simpson was also sent off.

=== Wolverhampton Wanderers ===
In February 2015, he signed for Wolverhampton Wanderers on a two-year contract.

==== Portsmouth (loan) ====
On 31 January 2017, Simpson joined Portsmouth on loan until the end of the season. On 17 March however, he returned to his parent club after failing to make a single appearance on the south-coast.

==== AFC Telford United (loan) ====
In August 2017, Simpson joined National League North side AFC Telford United on loan. He made his debut for the club on the opening day of the season, playing the duration of a 1–0 victory at York City.

==== Kilmarnock (loan) ====
In January 2018, Simpson joined Kilmarnock on loan.

=== Dover Athletic ===
On 23 July 2019, Simpson returned to English football, signing for National League side Dover Athletic. Simpson made 22 appearances in all competition for the Kent side during the 2019–20 season, before he was released at the end of a campaign that was cut short due to the coronavirus pandemic.

=== Sutton United ===
Simpson joined fellow National League side Sutton United just before the commencement of the 2020–21 season. He made his debut for the club on the opening day of the season, coming off of the bench in the 38 minute of a 3–0 victory over Maidenhead United. Simpson only appeared twelve times as Sutton won the National League title to gain promotion to the Football League for the first time in their history.

=== Hemel Hempstead Town ===
Following his release from Sutton, Simpson joined National League South side Hemel Hempstead Town in September 2021.

=== Gainsborough Trinity ===
On 1 August 2024, Simpson joined Northern Premier League Premier Division side Gainsborough Trinity following a successful trial period.

== Personal life ==
In 2021, Simpson appeared as a contestant on Series 7 of Love Island.

== Career statistics ==
As of end of 2020–21 season

Appearances and goals by club, season and competition
Club	Season	League			Domestic Cup (Note: All appearances in the FA Cup)		League Cup (Note: All appearances in the League of Ireland Cup)		Other		Total	
Club	Season	Division	Apps	Goals	Apps	Goals	Apps	Goals	Apps	Goals	Apps	Goals
Maidstone United	2014–15	Isthmian League Premier Division	9	0	5	0	—		0	0	14	0
Wolverhampton Wanderers U23	2016–17	—			—		—		4 (Note: Appearance(s) in EFL Trophy.)	0	4	0
Wolverhampton Wanderers U23	2017–18	—			—		—		0	0	0	0
Wolverhampton Wanderers U23	2018–19	—			—		—		0	0	0	0
Wolverhampton Wanderers U23	Total				—		—		4	0	4	0
AFC Telford United (loan)	2017–18	National League North	13	0	2	0	—		1 (Note: Appearance(s) in FA Trophy.)	0	16	0
Kilmarnock (loan)	2017–18	Scottish Premiership	4	0	0	0	0	0	0	0	4	0
FC Jumilla (loan)	2018–19	Segunda División B Group 4	6	0	0	0	0	0	0	0	6	0
Waterford	2019	League of Ireland Premier Division	8	0	0	0	1	0	0	0	9	0
Dover Athletic	2019–20	National League	20	0	1	0	—		1	0	22	0
Sutton United	2020–21	National League	12	1	0	0	—		1	0	13	1
Career total			72	1	8	0	1	0	7	0	88	1
