= Millie Court =

English television personality and influencer (born 1996)

- Born: Millie Grace Court; 4 December 1996 (age 29); Romford, East London, England
- Occupation: Television personality
- Years active: 2021–present
- Known for: Love Island; Love Island: All Stars

Millie Grace Court (born 4 December 1996) is an English television personality and social media influencer, known for winning the seventh series of Love Island in 2021 and appearing as a contestant on the third series of Love Island: All Stars in 2026.

== Life and career ==
Millie Grace Court was born on 4 December 1996 in Romford, East London. Prior to appearing on television, Court worked as a fashion buyer's administrator for ASOS.

In 2021, she became a contestant on the seventh series of the ITV2 reality dating show Love Island. She entered the villa as a "bombshell" on Day 9 and coupled up with Liam Reardon. They ultimately won the series with 42.02% of the final vote, becoming the first pair of late entrants to win a series. Reardon and Court initially split in July 2022, however rekindled the following year before splitting again in September 2025. After leaving the villa, Court began working as an influencer, and set up her own jewellery business Saith. In January 2026, it was announced that Court would return to Love Island to appear as a contestant on the third series of Love Island: All Stars. She entered the villa as an original contestant on Day 1.

== Filmography ==
As herself
Year	Title	Notes	Ref.
2021	Love Island	Winner; series 7	
2026	Love Island: All Stars	Contestant; series 3	
