= Madeline Cowe =

Australian model and beauty pageant titleholder

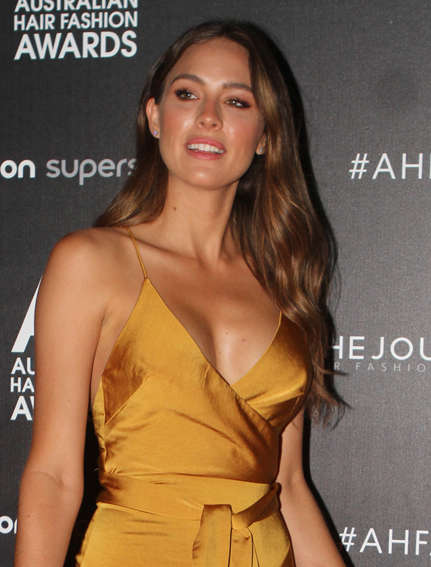
- Cowe in 2019 Australian Hair Fashion Awards
- Born: Cairns, Australia
- Height: 1.79 m (5 ft 10 in)
- Beauty pageant titleholder
- Title: Miss World Australia 2016
- Hair color: Brown
- Eye color: Green
- Major competitions: Miss Tourism Australia 2014; (2nd Runner-Up); Miss Universe Australia 2015; (1st Runner-Up); Miss World Australia 2016; (Winner); Miss World 2016; (Top 20); (Miss World Oceania); Miss Universe Australia 2019; (4th Runner-Up)

Madeline Cowe is an Australian TV Host, model, and beauty pageant titleholder. She won Miss World Australia 2016 and placed 1st Runner-up at Miss Universe Australia 2015. She represented Australia at Miss World 2016 pageant.

== Personal life ==
Cowe works as a model and TV host in Australia. She also was a contestant on Australia's Next Top Model.

== Pageantry ==
=== Miss Universe Australia 2015 ===
On 5 June 2015, Cowe placed 1st Runner-up at Miss Universe Australia 2015 in the ballroom at the Sofitel on Collins in Melbourne.

=== Miss World Australia 2016 ===
Cowe was crowned Miss World Australia 2016 on 22 July 2016 in the ballroom at the Sofitel on Collins in Melbourne and competed at Miss World 2016 on 18 December 2016 in Washington, D.C., United States.

=== Miss World 2016 ===
Cowe represented Australia at Miss World 2016 and placed Top 20 and earned the Miss World Oceania title.

=== Miss Universe Australia 2019 ===
On 27 June 2019, Cowe placed 4th Runner-up at Miss Universe Australia 2019 in the Sofitel Melbourne on Collins, Melbourne, Victoria.

Awards and achievements
Preceded by (Queensland) Tess Alexander	Miss World Australia; 2016	Succeeded by (Victoria (state)) Esma Voloder
