= OFTV =

Video streaming platform founded by OnlyFans

- Website type: OTT streaming platform
- Available in: English
- Country of origin: United Kingdom
- Industry: Entertainment; mass media
- Products: Streaming media; video on demand; digital distribution
- Services: Film production; film distribution; television production; television distribution
- Website: https://of.tv/
- Commercial: Yes
- Current status: Active

OFTV is an on-demand streaming service founded by the social media platform OnlyFans. Soft launched in January 2021 but announced in August 2021, the service differed from its parent firm as it made no attempt to monetise or run advertising. Its creators include large numbers of OnlyFans creators and alumni of Love Island and Married at First Sight and its works include the interview series In Real Life, fashion and comedy editions of OnlyFans Creative Fund, the agriculture shows Model Farmers and There's a Catch, the documentary series House of Sims, and the game shows This is Fire and The Quiet Games. Reviewers disagreed on the content's safeness for work and its quality.

== Background ==
The social media platform OnlyFans was founded in 2016 by Tim Stokely. While not intended to house adult content, its permissibility towards such content meant that it became known for it; Lucas Shaw of Bloomberg News wrote in August 2021 that the last time he wrote about the firm, "a few people criticized OnlyFans for trying to distance itself from the women that made it a success". In March 2021, OnlyFans announced a Creative Fund, which awarded four prizes of $20,000 each to aspiring musicians. By August 2021, the platform had around 130,000,000 subscribers and its most popular creators included Bhad Bhabie, Cardi B, Jordyn Woods, Bella Thorne, Tyga, Amber Rose, Blac Chyna, Rubi Rose, Tana Mongeau, and Trey Songz.

== History ==
OnlyFans soft launched OFTV in January 2021, though did not promote it until August 2021. The service differed from OnlyFans in that it did not allow pornographic content as neither Google Play nor Apple Inc.'s App Store allowed adult content, though this did not stop the latter from assigning the service a 17+ rating for among other things "infrequent/mild sexual content and nudity" and "frequent/intense mature/suggestive themes". OFTV made no attempt to monetise and did not run advertising. The announcement came in conjunction with the premiere of the second series of Unlocked, a series in which Casey Boonstra interviewed creators while they took part in mini-challenges such as making margaritas. Participants included Mia Khalifa, Holly Madison and Bella Thorne. Boonstra would later present In Real Life for the channel, a show with a similar premise featuring Kerry Katona, Sarah Jayne Dunn, Lottie Moss, Elle Brooke, Ebanie Bridges, and Eliza Watson. By the time of its announcement, the service hosted more than 800 videos from more than 100 channels.

OFTV aired OnlyFans Creative Fund: Fashion Edition, a fashion competition featuring Rebecca Minkoff and judged by Law Roach, Sir John, and Maeve Reilly. Francesca Farago was initially announced as sole host, though Grace Bukunmi was later hired as well; the winner received $50,000 and second and third place were awarded $25,000. OnlyFans had previously announced a similar competition for musicians with an £80,000 prize. OFTV also aired a four-part Comedy Edition of the programme, which sported a similar prize fund; judged by London Hughes, Jamali Maddix and Mae Martin, the programme was hosted by Jack Guinness and recorded in November 2022. The contestants were mentored by Sofie Hagen and included Mary O'Connell, who won the series. From September 2023, OFTV aired LMAOF, a series of standup comedy sets, some of which were recorded at Hoxton Hall in London and some of which were recorded in America; some episodes recorded in August 2024 were filmed at Monkey Barrel at the Edinburgh Festival Fringe. Other comedic content to have appeared on the platform included ribaldry from Whitney Cummings, who joined in November 2022, roasts of Cummings and Bert Kreischer, and comedy shows by Cummings and Hannah Stocking, who joined after hosting Cummings's roast.

Model Farmers trailer

In June 2022, OFTV announced Model Farmers, a show featuring six OnlyFans creators including the Love Island alumni Danielle Sellers, Jessie Wynter, and Shannon Singh putting in shifts at Becky Houzé's dairy farm in St Saviour, Jersey. The show was reviewed by Boots and Heels and was recommissioned for a second series set in a sheep farm in the Outback, which premiered in April 2023. Participants for the second series featured Love Island alumni Phoebe Thompson and Millie Fuller and Married at First Sight Australia bride Kate Laidlaw. In July 2022, Chloe, Frankie, and Demi Sims of The Only Way Is Essex were signed for House of Sims, a Keeping Up with the Kardashians-style documentary series that also featured their brother Charlie Sims and his girlfriend and their manager Georgia Shults. The first episode aired in May 2023, with subsequent episodes airing weekly and a second series airing in March 2024. In April 2024, Ben Pulsford of Closer wrote that the second series "somehow went from a wholesome postcard from LA to Big Brother's Fight Night" and Netflix aired the first series; Mike Piggott of Mediacat.uk wrote that the latter "effectively legitimis[ed OFTV] as a bona fide streamer". Chloe stated in March 2025 that there would not be a third series.

OFTV announced the second series of cooking competition This is Fire in January 2023, having released the first in 2022; the two series were hosted by Grandmaster Chef Jojo and won by Kazumi and Nathan Webb. By the following month, London Hughes and Tyler Posey had filmed for OFTV. By November, Amouranth had aired four episodes of The Quiet Games, a game show where OnlyFans creators had to compete challenges in a nursing home without disturbing its residents, and was in discussion to make other shows on the platform such as a cookery show and a take on American Ninja Warrior. They released There's a Catch in January 2024, which involved creators such as Love Island alumnus Rebecca Gormley and Married at First Sight alumnus Whitney Hughes working on traditional fishing boats, and which had previously been known as Off the Hook. From April 2025, OFTV aired Hannah Elizabeth's eight-episode series "Cooking with Hannah Elizabeth", which later changed its name to "Hans Scrans" [sic].

== Reception ==
Writing in August 2021 Lucas Shaw of Bloomberg News wrote that many of its creators left "little to the imagination in their videos" and Mark Stenburg of Adweek opined that the service was not particularly family friendly due to the presence of adult creators and series such as "Coffee and Cleavage", describing the latter as halfway between "talk show and peep show". Carly Tennes of Cracked.com wrote that "the old adage of “I can change him” may actually come true for the first time in all of recorded history" in OnlyFans entertaining "the pious overlords at Google and Apple", while Nick Hall of Man of Many described it as "surprisingly safe for work". Jyoti Mann of Business Insider reviewed the service's content in February 2023 and was unimpressed, describing the content as "chaotic and mediocre at best", though Piggott described the service in April 2024 as a "superb marketing exercise" and wrote that the site was "dominated by OF creators".
