= Finn Tapp =

English footballer and television personality (born 1999)

Finley Tapp
Personal information
- Full name: Finley Tapp
- Date of birth: 9 November 1999 (age 26)
- Place of birth: Milton Keynes, England
- Position: Defender

Youth career
- 2008–2016: Milton Keynes Dons

Senior career*
Years	Team	Apps	(Gls)
2016–2019	Milton Keynes Dons	0	(0)
2018–2019	→ Staines Town (loan)	9	(2)
2019–2020	Oxford City	20	(1)
2023	Banbury United	3	(0)
- * Club domestic league appearances and goals as of 19:35, 27 November 2023 (UTC)

Finley Tapp (born 9 November 1999) is an English television personality and semi-professional footballer who most recently played for Banbury United.

In 2020, Tapp won the sixth series of the ITV2 reality series Love Island. Prior to appearing on the show, Tapp was a semi-professional football player for non-league club Oxford City, having previously played as a professional for Milton Keynes Dons. He returned to football in 2023 with Banbury United.

== Club career ==
=== Milton Keynes Dons ===
Tapp joined Milton Keynes Dons' academy at the age of 8, progressing through various age groups and into the club's development squad. On 10 November 2016, whilst still an academy player, Tapp was named as a substitute for the first team's EFL Trophy group stage fixture against Norwich City. After coming on as a 76th-minute substitute, Tapp scored in the 84th-minute in an eventual 4–1 defeat.

Tapp signed professional terms with the club on 17 May 2018, signing a one-year deal with an option of a further year. He made his professional debut for the club on 28 August 2018, coming on as a second-half substitute in a 3–0 EFL Cup second round defeat away to Premier League side Bournemouth. Following limited first team opportunities during the first half of the 2018–19 season, Tapp joined seventh-tier club Staines Town until January 2019. Tapp was later one of ten players released by Milton Keynes Dons at the end of the season.

=== Oxford City ===
On 19 July 2019, following a successful trial, Tapp joined National League South club Oxford City.

=== Banbury United ===
In July 2023, Tapp returned to football when he joined National League North club Banbury United, reuniting with manager Mark Jones whom he had played under at Oxford City. He departed the club in November 2023.

== Media career ==
=== Love Island ===
In January 2020, it was announced that Tapp would join the sixth series of ITV2 dating programme Love Island, the first series to feature a winter villa, located in Cape Town, South Africa. Tapp entered the villa on Day 5.

On 23 February 2020, Tapp along with fellow participant Paige Turley were voted the show's winning couple by the UK public and shared a £50,000 prize. Tapp contested the show without permission from Oxford City, which the club's commercial director said though there was no formal breach of contract, but to avoid such situations, the club will introduce formal clauses inhibiting appearances on TV shows for players in future contract forms.

=== Celebrity Coach Trip ===
In January 2022, Tapp alongside partner Paige Turley featured in the seventh series of E4's Celebrity Coach Trip.

== Personal life ==
Tapp was in a relationship with Paige Turley, whom he met during the sixth series of Love Island, from 2020 to 2023.

== Career statistics ==
As of matches played 21 November 2023

Appearances and goals by club, season and competition
Club	Season	League			FA Cup		League Cup		Other		Total	
Club	Season	Division	Apps	Goals	Apps	Goals	Apps	Goals	Apps	Goals	Apps	Goals
Milton Keynes Dons	2016–17	League One	—		—		—		1 (Note: Appearances in EFL Trophy.)	1	1	1
Milton Keynes Dons	2018–19	League Two	0	0	0	0	1	0	2	0	3	0
Milton Keynes Dons	Total		0	0	0	0	1	0	3	1	4	1
Staines Town (loan)	2018–19	Southern Premier South	9	2	—		—		—		9	2
Oxford City	2019–20	National League South	20	1	2	0	—		0	0	22	1
Banbury United	2023–24	National League North	3	0	0	0	—		1	0	4	0
Career total			32	3	2	0	1	0	4	1	39	4
