= Mike Boateng =

British TV Personality

- Born: Michael Boateng; London, England
- Occupation: Actor
- Television: Love Island (2015 TV series, series 6) (2020)

Michael Boateng is a reality TV personality. Boateng first came to public attention in 2020 when he appeared on the sixth series of reality dating show Love Island. Boateng was eliminated on day 41 from the show, narrowly missing the opportunity to participate in the finals. Boateng then went on to appear on Celebrity Ex on the Beach in 2022.

== Career ==
=== Football ===
Boateng joined Sheffield United Academy in 2013 signing from non-league side Handsworth FC, where he was team-mates with Dominic Calvert-Lewin. He went on to sign a third-year scholarship at Sheffield United. During his time at Sheffield United, Boateng was loaned out to Emley A.F.C. before returning to Sheffield United at the end of his scholarship and then released from the club.

=== Love Island ===
Boateng was employed by Greater Manchester Police where he served two years as a police constable. After two years of police service, Boateng ventured into television, becoming a cast member on the first winter series of Love Island in 2020. He then went on to appear on Celebrity Ex on the Beach in 2022.

== Awards ==
In 2020, Boateng was nominated for a National Reality TV Award in the "Best Male Personality of the Year" category. In 2022, Boateng was again nominated for a National Reality TV Award, this time in the "Reality Personality of the Year" category.

== Personal life ==
Boateng's brother, who changed his name to Samuel Brooksworth, has also participated in reality television. In 2016, he competed as a contestant on the popular reality series, 'The Apprentice'.
