= Maria Thattil =

Australian activist, media personality, and beauty pageant titleholder (born 1992/93)

- Born: 1992 or 1993 (age 33–34); Melbourne, Victoria, Australia
- Occupations: Actor; Media personality; author
- Partner: Single
- Beauty pageant titleholder
- Title: Miss Universe Australia 2020
- Years active: 2020–present
- Hair color: Brown
- Eye color: Brown
- Major competitions: Miss Universe Australia 2020 (Winner); Miss Universe 2020 (Top 10)
- Website: mariathattil.com

Maria Thattil (born 1992 or 1993) is an Australian actress, media personality, beauty pageant titleholder and authoress. She was crowned Miss Universe Australia 2020 and then represented Australia at Miss Universe 2020, where she was placed in the top 10.

== Early life and education ==
Maria Thattil is an Indian Australian woman. She was born in 1992 or 1993 in Melbourne after her parents emigrated from India to Australia in the 1980s or early 1990s. Her father is from Kerala and her mother from West Bengal.

She went to a private girls' school, and was bullied growing up, and thought that she would have to rid herself of her Indian identity in order to blend in as an Australian. As a teen, she took performing arts classes at Stage School Australia.

She has two degrees: a bachelor's degree in applied science, majoring in psychology, from RMIT and a Master of Management (Human Resources) from the University of Melbourne in 2017. She had intended to become a clinical psychologist, but halfway through the psychology honours program, felt that it was not right for her. After working in fashion retail for two years and enjoying managing a team, she had changed course to management. She did night classes till 9:45pm Mondays to Fridays, and worked retail every weekend for two years.

Thattil was nominated for a Harvard fellowship program, which she turned down after deciding that her focus would go wider than the business world.

== Career ==
After graduating, Thattil did a lot of contract work, including HR roles, until she won a corporate role as a "talent acquisition partner" at the Victoria State Government's North East Link Project.

=== Miss Universe ===
Thattil was named Miss Universe Australia in October 2020, and was placed in the top 10 of the global competition as only the third non-white woman to represent Australia. She said that she had entered the competition partly "to redefine Australian beauty standards" in Australia, which were focused on tall white women (she is just 5'3"), and to defy bullies and trolls who had targeted her on social media. Upon winning the competition, she was only the third non-white woman to win in its nearly 70-year history. She was interviewed by media and it started conversations about racism, as well as barriers for women and young people.

=== Media appearances ===
She has had many appearances on Australian television, as a presenter, frequent commentator, and actress. She has appeared on Channel 9's Today Extra, and Talking Honey, Seven Network's The Morning Show, ABC's News Breakfast and India Now; and Network 10's Studio 10.

In January 2022, Thattil appeared as a contestant on the eighth season of I'm a Celebrity...Get Me Out of Here! Australia. She was the second contestant to be eliminated. While in the jungle, she came out as bisexual.

In 2023 she began making occasional appearances as a co-host on Network 10's current affairs news show The Project. In July of that year, she became the host of her own podcast The Maria Thattil Show.

On 4 August 2023, Thattil was a guest judge in an episode of RuPaul's Drag Race Down Under.

On 2 September 2024 she appeared on ABC Television's current affairs panel show Q+A, in a special event filmed in Dandenong, Victoria.

=== Acting ===
In August 2023 Thattil made her acting debut in a guest role in the remake of Mother and Son on ABC Television.

In December 2023, Thattil joined the cast of Neighbours in the guest role of Amira Devkar, the first South Asian queer character in the show. She made her first appearance in May 2024, and appeared in six episodes of the show.

She has created a series on TikTok called Lets Get Ducking Famous!, in which her character, Naomi, and her friend try to make their duck famous on social media.

=== Writing ===
After securing a book deal with Penguin in August 2021, she started writing the following year. In 2023, she published Unbounded, a book that navigates the complexities of identity. It is describes the book as "part memoir, part inspiration", and is grounded in academic research.

== Other activities ==
Thattil is a supporter of diversity, inclusion and equality. She is an advocate for women and the LGBTQIA+ community and stands against racism. She has built a social media following of over 70,000 by 2024.

She said in 2022 that she may consider a career in politics when she's older.

Thattil has been ambassador for the Witchery White Shirt campaigns, which raises money for the Ovarian Cancer Research Foundation, since at least 2022 and as of 2024.

In October 2023, she gave a talk at TedX Sydney, titled "The 6 Words You Need To Change Your Life", in which she spoke about embracing her authentic self, and using her voice and platform to speak out about issues that are important to her.

She has also represented many well-known brands, including Olay, Alfa Romeo, Clinique, Myer, Tommy Hilfiger, and others. She has been keynote speaker and host at many events for international conglomerates and other institutions, such as Microsoft, Westpac, Are Media, Verizon Media, and the major Melbourne universities.

== Recognition ==
- 2023: "Voice of Now", at Marie Claire's Women of the Year Awards, "for her work as a trailblazing Australian who has broken barriers and championed for change"
- 2024: Named by as one of six honorees of Elle magazine's "BOLD, BRIGHT, BRAVE" event

== Personal life ==
Thattil is bisexual, and has campaigned for acceptance of LGBTQI people. She came out on national television (onI'm A Celebrity...Get Me Out Of Here!), having been working for an LGBTQIA+ youth charity called Minus18 on behalf of her brother, who is gay. She said that coming out to her parents was made easier by her brother having come out as gay eight years earlier. They were previously part of a culturally conservative community, but had changed their views considerably since. Her parents are completely supportive of both her and her brother now. She had a relationship with a man in her 20s, starting to explore her sexual identity after they split.

She revealed that she had an abortion at age 21, and is of the view that abortion is part of healthcare, and "a fundamental human right".

As of 2022 she lives in Melbourne. In September 2023 she revealed her relationship with former AFLW player and Survivor contestant Moana Hope. The couple split in February 2025.

== Television ==
Show	Role	Year	Notes
I'm a Celebrity...Get Me Out of Here!	Contestant	2022	Eliminated second
The Project	Guest Co-host	2023–present	
Mother and Son	Priya	2023	Guest; episode 2
Neighbours	Amira Devkar	2024	Recurring; 6 episodes

Awards and achievements
Preceded by (Victoria (state)) Priya Serrao	Miss Universe Australia; 2020	Succeeded by (Victoria (state)) Daria Varlamova
