= Miss Universe Australia 2020 =

Beauty pageant edition

- Date: 28 October 2020
- Venue: Sofitel Melbourne on Collins, Melbourne, Victoria
- Entrants: 26
- Placements: 15
- Winner: Maria Thattil; Victoria
- Congeniality: Maria Thattil; Victoria
- Photogenic: Emily Tokić (Australian Capital Territory) Capital Territory

Miss Universe Australia 2020 was the 16th edition of the Miss Universe Australia pageant held on 28 October 2020 at Sofitel Melbourne on Collins, Melbourne, Victoria. The pageant finals were originally scheduled for 25 June 2020, but was postponed to 28 October 2020 due to COVID-19 pandemic.

Priya Serrao of Victoria crowned Maria Thattil of Victoria at the end of the event. Thattil represented Australia at Miss Universe 2020 in Florida, and placed in the Top 10.

== Final results ==
Final results	Contestant
Miss Universe Australia 2020	Victoria – Maria Thattil
1st Runner-Up	Queensland – Miné Coetser
2nd Runner-Up	New South Wales – Tash Galgut
3rd Runner-Up	New South Wales – Maddison Coluccio
4th Runner-Up	Victoria – Daria Varlamova
Top 10	(Australian Capital Territory) Capital Territory – Emily Tokić; Queensland – Jacqui Scheiwe; Victoria – Brooke McAuley; Victoria – Mimi Bullkoch; Western Australia – Kya Pedrick
Top 15	Queensland – Narah Baptista; Queensland – Summah Taylor; Western Australia – Diana Coniglio; Western Australia – Zara Edgar; Western Australia – Tasha Marciano

=== Special awards ===
Award	Contestant
Miss Amity	Victoria – Maria Thattil
Miss Photogenic	(Australian Capital Territory) Capital Territory – Emily Tokić

== Delegates ==
State/Territory	Contestant	Age	Hometown
(Australian Capital Territory) Capital Territory	Emily Tokić	22	Canberra
New South Wales	Anneliese Zanchetta	20	Sydney
New South Wales	Maddison Coluccio	23	Sydney
New South Wales	Mikayla Schnabel	23	Sydney
New South Wales	Rebecca Portugall	23	Johannesburg
New South Wales	Tash Galgut	22	Sydney
New South Wales	Taylor Davey	19	Sydney
Queensland	Bianca Black	22	Gold Coast
Queensland	Jacqui Scheiwe	26	Brisbane
Queensland	Madison Reinhardt	19	Gold Coast
Queensland	Miné Coetser	18	Pretoria
Queensland	Narah Baptista	24	Brisbane
Queensland	Summah Taylor	23	Byron Bay
South Australia	Isabella Newman	21	Adelaide
South Australia	Keava Hopper	23	Adelaide
South Australia	Molly Ferguson	21	Adelaide
Tasmania	Brooke Rogers	23	Hobart
Tasmania	Elsie Killick	25	Hobart
Victoria	Ashlyn Paraskevas	23	Melbourne
Victoria	Brooke McAuley	27	Melbourne
Victoria	Daria Varlamova	25	Bryansk
Victoria	Hanan Ibrahim	26	Melbourne
Victoria	Holly Dexter	23	Ballarat
Victoria	Kristen Czyszek	24	Melbourne
Victoria	Maria Thattil	26	Melbourne
Western Australia	Diana Coniglio	21	Perth
Western Australia	Kya Pedrick	23	Perth
Western Australia	Tasha Marciano	25	Perth
Western Australia	Zara Edgar	19	Melbourne
