= Olivia Hawkins =

English television personality and actress (born 1995)

- Born: Olivia Dominique Hawkins; 20 June 1995 (age 31); Brighton, England
- Occupations: Television personality; actress
- Years active: 2016–present
- Known for: Love Island; Love Island: All Stars

Olivia Dominique Hawkins (born 20 June 1995) is an English television personality and actress. After portraying minor roles in television shows including Top Boy, Queens of Mystery and Grace, she appeared as a contestant on the ninth series of the ITV2 dating show Love Island in 2023. She also appeared on the second series of Love Island: All Stars in 2025, as well as Celebs Go Dating.

== Life and career ==
Olivia Dominique Hawkins was born on 20 June 1995 in Brighton, England. After graduating with BA Hons in professional dance and musical theatre, she went on to work as an actress, model and a ring girl, appearing in various television shows, films and music videos. In 2016, she appeared in the short film My Dolly as Rachel. In 2017, Hawkins appeared as a body double for Michelle Keegan in an advert for Very and appeared in music videos for Chip, Matt Terry and Craig David. In 2018, she portrayed a young Elizabeth Taylor in the episode Autopsy: The Last Hours of.... The same year, she appeared in music videos for Tom Zanetti, Krept and Konan, Yungen and Dapz. In 2019, she appeared in the introduction of the fifth series of the ITV2 dating series Love Island as a woman at the sandwich van owned by contestant Joe Garratt. In 2021, Hawkins appeared as a waitress in the film No Time to Die.

In 2023, she became a contestant on the ninth series of Love Island. She entered the villa as an original islander on Day 1, and was dumped from the villa on Day 45 alongside Maxwell Samuda after the pair received the fewest votes from the public. She also appeared in an episode of the BBC soap opera EastEnders and the ITV2 comedy Buffering. In 2025, it was announced that Hawkins would return to Love Island to appear as a contestant on the second series of Love Island: All Stars. Later that year, she was cast on the fourteenth series of Celebs Go Dating on E4.

== Filmography ==
=== Television and film ===
Year	Title	Role	Notes	Ref.
2016	My Dolly	Rachel	Short film	
2018	Autopsy: The Last Hours of...	Young Elizabeth Taylor	Episode: "Elizabeth Taylor"	
2019	Love Island	Woman at Sandwich Van	Series 5	
2019	Top Boy	Party Girl	Episode: "Bruk Up"	
2021	No Time to Die	Waitress	Film role	
2021	Queens of Mystery	Lady Overshaw	2 episodes	
2022	Harry Potter 20th Anniversary: Return to Hogwarts	Emma Watson's body double	Stand-in role	
2022	Grace	Air Hostess	Episode: "Dead Man's Footsteps"	
2023	Love Island	Herself	Contestant; series 9	
2023	EastEnders	Woman in club	1 episode	
2023	Buffering	Girl at Bar	Episode: "The Ick"	
2025	Love Island: All Stars	Herself	Contestant; series 2	
2025	Celebs Go Dating	Herself	Main cast; series 14	

=== Stage ===
Year	Title	Role	Ref.
2016	Hello, Dolly!	Irene Molloy	

=== Music videos ===
Year	Song	Artist	Ref.
2017	"Honestly" (feat. 67)	Chip	
2017	"For the Gram"	Craig David	
2017	"Try"	Matt Terry	
2018	"Judgement Day" (feat. Suspect)	Deli Bricks	
2018	"Athlete"	Boy Better Know	
2018	"Make You Look Good"	Tom Zanetti	
2018	"Pour Me Another One"(feat. Tabitha)	Krept and Konan	
2018	"Intimate" (feat. Craig David)	Yungen	
2020	"Take You Away"	Dapz	
