= Shannon Singh =

Reality TV personality

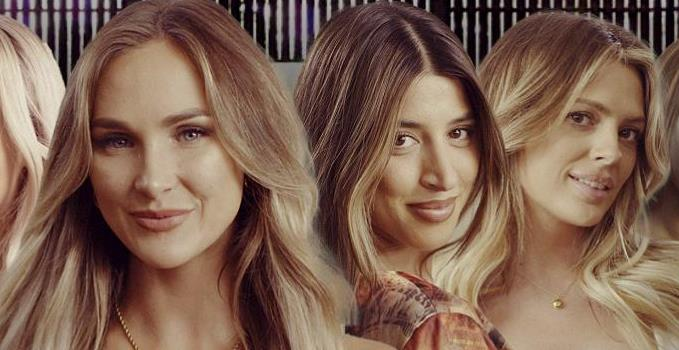
- Jessie Wynter, Singh, and Danielle Sellers in 2022
- Born: 1998 or 1999 (age 27–28); Glenrothes, Scotland
- Occupations: Glamour model; TV personality
- Television: Love Island

Shannon Singh is a Scottish reality TV personality. She appeared on the 2021 series of Love Island, but was eliminated just one day into the series. She now resides in Glenrothes, Scotland.

== Life and career ==
Singh was born in Glenrothes, Scotland. Her father was an Indian Punjabi mechanic from Birmingham. She started modelling at age 18 when her mother sent photos of her to an agency in London. She has modelled for Nastygal, Savage X Fenty, and Pretty Little Thing. She expresses some regret over her treatment early in her modelling career, signing release forms that give up all rights to the photos, allowing people to distribute them as they wish. She recommends that newcomers to the industry educate themselves about their rights as workers and seek legal representation when signing documents relating to their career.

Singh had a large following on OnlyFans before she decided to cancel her account due to pictures being leaked to the public. She also maintains YouTube and Instagram channels and has been a DJ. She appeared on the 2021 edition of Love Island and was given the highest odds of winning; despite this, she was the first contestant to leave the show, being dumped after just one day on the island. Singh was the shortest-lived contestant in the show's history. After her departure, fans had hoped she would come back later in the series in a surprise twist; this was not to be. She was approached by producers of the show after coming out of a relationship via message on one of her social media channels and decided to give the show a try. Singh prepared for 15 days before filming started and was required to quarantine for 48 hours to be on the show. In 2022, Singh, fellow Love Island alumni Danielle Sellers and Jessie Wynter, and three other models learned how to run a dairy farm for Model Farmers, a reality series aired on OFTV.

== Influence ==
She is cited as a positive example of minorities in the media and admits to having taken much verbal abuse from men in her ethnic community over her overt sexuality. During her modelling career, she describes that "my race was constantly questioned and undermined". Since overcoming these difficulties, she uses her social media channels to advocate for female empowerment. She admits to being selective about what offers she accepts as an influencer. She feels OnlyFans is a positive experience as creators own the content and have more control over who gets to see it. Some have accused her of "bringing disgrace to the brown community" before appearing on Love Island, but she has generally responded with positivity to the backlash. Singh has received many negative comments online, mostly from Asian men, "about "not looking Indian enough" and about how she "doesn't deserve" to have Singh in her name". Many were quick to point out that Singh's dismissal from the Island, one of the first four who were all women of colour, is symptomatic of the modern dating world "where white beauty standards are the default."
