= Danielle Sellers =

English model and television personality (born 1995)

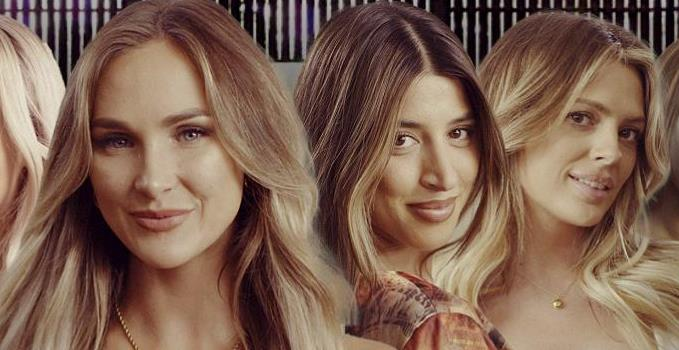
- Jessie Wynter, Shannon Singh, and Sellers in 2022
- Born: 14 May 1995 (age 31); Hastings, East Sussex, England
- Occupations: Model; television personality
- Years active: 2016–present
- Known for: Love Island; Love Island: All Stars

Danielle Sellers (born 14 May 1995) is an English model and television personality. Born in Hastings in East Sussex, she modelled for Page 3 before taking part in the third series of Love Island in 2017 and the second series of Love Island: All Stars in 2025. She also operates the Instagram account "Delicious Danielle", in which she posts about food, and appeared on OFTV's Model Farmers in 2022.

== Life and career ==
Danielle Sellers was born on 14 May 1995 in Hastings, East Sussex. By 2017, she had appeared as a Page 3 model. That year, she became a contestant on the third series of the ITV2 reality dating show Love Island, entering the villa as a bombshell during Casa Amor. She appeared on the programme due to the successful relationships and careers formed by those who had appeared on previous series. She was chosen by Jonny Mitchell at the recoupling and was brought back to the main villa, however was subsequently dumped five days later after Marcel Somerville chose her to leave the island following a public vote. She and numerous other contestants from that series subsequently appeared on This Morning.

Sellers then dated Jack Maynard after being introduced by his brother Conor Maynard; that relationship lasted seven months. She made a further appearance on This Morning in June 2018. She stated in 2019 that she had struggled with dating after leaving the programme due to an inability to trust subsequent partners. In 2022, Sellers, fellow Love Island alumni Shannon Singh and Jessie Wynter, and three other models learned how to run a dairy farm for Model Farmers, a reality series aired on OFTV, a derivative of OnlyFans created as part of efforts to diversify into non-explicit content. At the time, all six participants were on OnlyFans.

By January 2025, she had moved to London and had begun uploading food content to the Instagram account "Delicious Danielle", which had 150,000 followers, and to a TikTok account. That month, it was announced that Sellers would return to Love Island to appear as a contestant on the second series of Love Island: All Stars. She again entered the series as a bombshell shortly after Somerville's departure and coupled up with Curtis Pritchard, Ron Hall, and Chuggs Wallis before being dumped following a recoupling. She returned to the programme with ten other Islanders from that series to choose a couple to eliminate; both she and five others decided to eliminate Ronnie Vint and Harriett Blackmore.

== Filmography ==
As herself
Year	Title	Notes	Ref.
2017	Love Island	Contestant; series 3	
2022	Model Farmers	Participant	
2025	Love Island: All Stars	Contestant; series 2	
