= Andrea-Jane Bunker =

British influencer & boxer (born 1992)

A. J. Bunker
- Born: Andrea-Jane Bunker; 9 December 1992 (age 33); Hertfordshire, England
- Occupations: Reality television personality, boxer
- Years active: 2021–present
- Known for: Love Island

Andrea-Jane "AJ" Bunker (born 9 December 1992) is a British reality television personality, social media influencer, and amateur boxer. known for appearing as a contestant on the seventh series of the ITV2 dating show Love Island. After the show, she got into influencer boxing, competing in events with Misfits Boxing and Kingpyn.

== Early life ==
Andrea-Jane Bunker was born on 9 December 1992, in Hertfordshire, England. She worked as a hair extensions technician.

== Career ==
Bunker took part in the seventh season of Love Island in 2021, joining the show as a late arrival. She was voted off after her arrival on the show.

After leaving reality television. She joined the influencer boxing scene in 2022, competing under the Misfits and Kingpyn promotions. She made her professional debut on 16 July 2022 at The O₂ in London, where she came up against British influencer Elle Brooke.

On 26 November 2022, she made her return to the ring against Natasha Sweeney at the Battle of Thrones event in London and won by unanimous decision following four rounds.

In March 2023, Bunker competed for the inaugural Misfits women’s flyweight title against social media personality Astrid Wett at Misfits & DAZN: X Series 005 in Telford. After three rounds, Wett won the match by majority decision.

Bunker later faced Elle Brooke again on 20 January 2024 at Misfits Boxing 12. The rematch ended in a third-round knockout victory for Brooke, who went on to claim a Misfits title belt.

In January 2026, Bunker returned to Love Island, as a contestant on the third series of Love Island: All Stars.

== Personal life ==
Bunker resides in Hertfordshire, England, she has two brothers, including Lance Bombardier and Tom, who are part of the King's Troop Royal Horse Artillery in Woolwich.

== Filmography ==
=== Television ===
As herself
Year	Title	Role
2021	Love Island	Contestant; series 7
2022	Kingpyn Boxing	Participant
2026	Love Island: All Stars	Contestant; series 3

== Boxing record ==
=== MF–Exhibition Boxing ===
5 fights	2 wins	3 losses
By disqualification	2	3

No.	Result	Opponent	Type	Date	Location
1	Loss	Elle Brooke	UD	16 July 2022	Indigo at The O2, London
2	Win	Natasha Sweeney	UD	26 November 2022	The Willows London
3	Loss	Astrid Wett	UD	4 March 2023	Telford International Centre
4	Win	Arabella del Busso	UD	23 November 2023	Vertu Motors Arena
5	Loss	Elle Brooke	UD	20 January 2024	First Direct Arena
