= Love Island (2015 TV series) series 7 =

2021 series of Love Island

Love Island
- Series 7
- Presented by: Laura Whitmore
- No. of days: 58
- No. of contestants: 37
- Winners: Millie Court; Liam Reardon
- Runners-up: Toby Aromolaran; Chloe Burrows
- Companion show: Love Island: Aftersun
- No. of episodes: 49

Release
- Original network: ITV2
- Original release: 28 June – 23 August 2021

Series chronology
- ← Previous; Series 6 Next → Series 8

The seventh series of Love Island began broadcasting on 28 June 2021 and was hosted by Laura Whitmore on ITV2. Iain Stirling returned to narrate the series. The series was originally planned to air in the summer of 2020, but was postponed due to the ongoing COVID-19 pandemic.

Singer Mabel made a cameo appearance at a Spotify party in the villa performing some of her hits including her new single "Let Them Know".

On 23 August 2021, the series was won by Liam Reardon and Millie Court with 42.02% of the final vote, becoming the first couple of late entrants to win a series. Chloe Burrows and Toby Aromolaran finished as runners-up. This series was watched by an average of 4.17 million viewers which includes catch up figures.

== Production ==
During the final of the previous series on 23 February 2020, it was confirmed that Love Island would return for a seventh series due to air later in the year. However, on 4 May 2020, Love Island announced the cancellation of the summer 2020 show due to the COVID-19 pandemic." It was later confirmed that the show would not be airing a winter version of the series in 2021 due to uncertainties regarding the pandemic and international travel. On 4 March 2021, ITV confirmed that the show would return in the summer after an 18-month hiatus. In April 2021, during the application process, it was reported that LGBT contestants were being encouraged to apply for the first time, via dating app Tinder, however in June, ITV commissioner Amanda Stavri stated that the inclusion of LGBT contestants presents "logistical difficulties". The first 10-second trailer for the series aired on 29 May 2021 featuring presenter Laura Whitmore breaking a heart-shaped fire alarm with a hammer, followed by the tagline "This is not a drill". A full length trailer was released on 5 June 2021. On 16 June 2021, ITV released details of its duty of care protocols for the new series, with detailed welfare plans in place to support participants before, during and after filming. Some of the episodes in this series were aired outside of the usual 9pm timeslot due to Euro 2020.

== Islanders ==
The Islanders for the seventh series were released on 21 June 2021, just one week before the launch. The series was won by Liam Reardon and Millie Court.

Islander	Age	Hometown	Entered	Exited	Status	Ref.
Liam Reardon	21	Merthyr Tydfil	Day 4	Day 58	Winner	
Millie Court	24	Romford	Day 9	Day 58	Winner	
Chloe Burrows	25	Bicester	Day 1	Day 58	Runner-up	
Toby Aromolaran	22	Chafford Hundred	Day 1	Day 58	Runner-up	
Faye Winter	26	Exeter	Day 1	Day 58	Third place	
Teddy Soares	26	Manchester	Day 12	Day 58	Third place	
Kaz Kamwi	26	Witham	Day 1	Day 58	Fourth place	
Tyler Cruickshank	26	London	Day 23	Day 58	Fourth place	
Jake Cornish	24	Weston-super-Mare	Day 1	Day 54	Walked	
Liberty Poole	21	Birmingham	Day 1	Day 54	Walked	
Aaron Simpson	24	Canterbury	Day 42	Day 52	Dumped	
Mary Bedford	22	Wakefield	Day 29	Day 52	Dumped	
Brett Staniland	27	Draycott	Day 44	Day 50	Dumped	
Priya Gopaldas	23	London	Day 42	Day 50	Dumped	
Matthew MacNabb	26	Downpatrick	Day 29	Day 45	Dumped	
Abigail Rawlings	27	Bournemouth	Day 23	Day 42	Dumped	
Dale Mehmet	24	Glasgow	Day 29	Day 42	Dumped	
Amy Day	25	West Molesey	Day 29	Day 38	Dumped	
Clarisse Juliette	23	London	Day 29	Day 38	Dumped	
Hugo Hammond	24	Alton	Day 1	Day 38	Dumped	
Sam Jackson	23	Clitheroe	Day 29	Day 38	Dumped	
Harry Young	24	Wishaw	Day 29	Day 32	Dumped	
Jack Barlow	26	Pett	Day 29	Day 32	Dumped	
Kaila Troy	28	Malahide	Day 29	Day 32	Dumped	
Lillie Haynes	22	South Shields	Day 29	Day 32	Dumped	
Medhy Malanda	24	Luton	Day 29	Day 32	Dumped	
Salma Naran	20	Dublin	Day 29	Day 32	Dumped	
Aaron Francis	24	London	Day 1	Day 28	Dumped	
Lucinda Strafford	21	Ditchling	Day 9	Day 28	Dumped	
Georgia Townend	28	Maldon	Day 23	Day 25	Dumped	
Andrea-Jane "AJ" Bunker	28	Dunstable	Day 17	Day 23	Dumped	
Danny Bibby	25	Leigh	Day 18	Day 23	Dumped	
Sharon Gaffka	25	Didcot	Day 1	Day 19	Dumped	
Brad McClelland	26	Amble	Day 1	Day 16	Dumped	
Rachel Finni	29	Barnet	Day 5	Day 14	Dumped	
Oliver "Chuggs" Wallis	23	Weybridge	Day 4	Day 6	Dumped	
Shannon Singh	22	Glenrothes	Day 1	Day 2	Dumped	

== Future appearances ==
In 2023, Lucinda Strafford appeared on season five of Love Island Australia. Toby Aromolaran and Liberty Poole appeared on season one of Love Island Games.

In 2024, Aromolaran, Jake Cornish, Tyler Cruickshank, Kaz Kamwi, and Poole returned for series one of Love Island: All Stars.

In 2025, Oliver "Chuggs" Wallis returned for series two of Love Island: All Stars. Aromolaran and Strafford competed on season two of Love Island Games.

In 2026, AJ Bunker, Strafford and Millie Court returned for series three of Love Island: All Stars. Aromolaran competed on the fourth series of Celebrity Ex on the Beach.

== Coupling and elimination history ==
	Week 1			Week 2	Week 3			Week 4		Week 5		Week 6		Week 7		Week 8			
	Day 1	Day 2	Day 5	Day 6	Day 14	Day 16	Day 19	Day 23	Day 25	Day 28	Day 32	Day 37	Day 38	Day 42	Day 45	Day 50	Day 52	Day 54	Final
Liam	Not in Villa		Faye		Millie	Safe	Millie	Safe	Millie	Safe	Millie	Millie	Safe	Safe	Millie	Faye & Teddy; Brett & Priya; Least compatible	Safe	Finalist	Winner (Day 58)
Millie	Not in Villa				Liam	Safe	Liam	Safe	Liam	Safe	Liam	Liam	Safe	Safe	Liam	Faye & Teddy; Brett & Priya; Least compatible	Safe	Finalist	Winner (Day 58)
Chloe	Not in Villa	Aaron F	Hugo		Toby	Safe	Toby	Vulnerable	Hugo	Safe	Dale	Toby	Safe	Safe	Toby	Brett & Priya; Jake & Liberty; Least compatible	Safe	Finalist	Runner-up (Day 58)
Toby	Kaz		Kaz		Chloe	Safe	Chloe	Vulnerable	Abigail	Immune	Mary	Chloe	Safe	Safe	Chloe	Brett & Priya; Jake & Liberty; Least compatible	Safe	Finalist	Runner-up (Day 58)
Faye	Brad		Liam		Teddy	Safe	Teddy	Safe	Teddy	Vulnerable	Sam	Teddy	Safe	Safe	Teddy	Brett & Priya; Aaron S & Mary; Least compatible	Safe	Finalist	Third place (Day 58)
Teddy	Not in Villa				Faye	Safe	Faye	Vulnerable	Faye	Vulnerable	Single	Faye	Safe	Safe	Faye	Brett & Priya; Aaron S & Mary; Least compatible	Safe	Finalist	Third place (Day 58)
Kaz	Toby		Toby		Aaron F	Safe	Aaron F	Safe	Tyler	Immune	Matthew	Matthew	Safe	Vulnerable	Tyler	Aaron S & Mary; Faye & Teddy; Least compatible	Safe	Finalist	Fourth place (Day 58)
Tyler	Not in Villa								Kaz	Immune	Clarisse	Clarisse	Vulnerable	Vulnerable	Kaz	Aaron S & Mary; Faye & Teddy; Least compatible	Safe	Finalist	Fourth place (Day 58)
Jake	Liberty		Liberty		Liberty	Safe	Liberty	Safe	Liberty	Safe	Liberty	Liberty	Safe	Vulnerable	Liberty	Faye & Teddy; Brett & Priya; Least compatible	Safe	Walked (Day 54)	
Liberty	Jake		Jake		Jake	Safe	Jake	Safe	Jake	Safe	Jake	Jake	Safe	Safe	Jake	Faye & Teddy; Brett & Priya; Least compatible	Safe	Walked (Day 54)	
Aaron S	Not in Villa														Mary	Jake & Liberty; Brett & Priya; Least compatible	Eliminated	Dumped (Day 52)	
Mary	Not in Villa										Toby	Sam	Vulnerable	Vulnerable	Aaron S	Jake & Liberty; Brett & Priya; Least compatible	Eliminated	Dumped (Day 52)	
Brett	Not in Villa														Priya	Jake & Liberty; Aaron S & Mary; Least compatible	Dumped (Day 50)		
Priya	Not in Villa														Brett	Jake & Liberty; Aaron S & Mary; Least compatible	Dumped (Day 50)		
Matthew	Not in Villa										Kaz	Kaz	Safe	Safe	Single	Dumped (Day 45)			
Abigail	Not in Villa								Toby	Immune	Single	Dale	Safe	Vulnerable	Dumped (Day 42)				
Dale	Not in Villa										Chloe	Abigail	Safe	Vulnerable	Dumped (Day 42)				
Amy	Not in Villa										Hugo	Hugo	Vulnerable	Dumped (Day 38)					
Clarisse	Not in Villa										Tyler	Tyler	Vulnerable	Dumped (Day 38)					
Hugo	Sharon		Chloe		Sharon	Safe	AJ	Safe	Chloe	Safe	Amy	Amy	Vulnerable	Dumped (Day 38)					
Sam	Not in Villa										Faye	Mary	Vulnerable	Dumped (Day 38)					
Harry	Not in Villa										Single	Dumped (Day 32)							
Jack	Not in Villa										Single	Dumped (Day 32)							
Kaila	Not in Villa										Single	Dumped (Day 32)							
Lillie	Not in Villa										Single	Dumped (Day 32)							
Medhy	Not in Villa										Single	Dumped (Day 32)							
Salma	Not in Villa										Single	Dumped (Day 32)							
Aaron F	Shannon	Chloe	Sharon		Kaz	Safe	Kaz	Safe	Lucinda	Eliminated	Dumped (Day 28)								
Lucinda	Not in Villa				Brad	Brad to dump	Danny	Vulnerable	Aaron F	Eliminated	Dumped (Day 28)								
Georgia	Not in Villa								Single	Dumped (Day 25)									
AJ	Not in Villa						Hugo	Vulnerable	Dumped (Day 23)										
Danny	Not in Villa						Lucinda	Vulnerable	Dumped (Day 23)										
Sharon	Hugo		Aaron F		Hugo	Safe	Single	Dumped (Day 19)											
Brad	Faye		Single	Rachel	Lucinda	Brad to dump	Dumped (Day 16)												
Rachel	Not in Villa			Brad	Single	Dumped (Day 14)													
Chuggs	Not in Villa		Single		Dumped (Day 6)														
Shannon	Aaron F	Single	Dumped (Day 2)																
Walked	none																	Jake & Liberty	none
Dumped	No; Dumping	Shannon; Failed to couple up	No; Dumping	Chuggs; Failed to couple up	Rachel; Failed to couple up	Brad; Brad & Lucinda's choice to dump	Sharon; Failed to couple up	AJ; Boys' choice to dump	Georgia; Failed to couple up	Aaron F & Lucinda; Public's choice to dump	Harry, Jack, Kaila, Lillie, Medhy, Salma; Failed to couple up	No; Dumping	Amy, Clarisse; Boys' choice to dump	Abigail; Boys' choice to dump	Matthew; Failed to couple up	Brett & Priya; Public's choice to dump	Aaron S & Mary; Public's choice to dump	No; Dumping	Kaz & Tyler; 12.27% to win
Dumped	No; Dumping	Shannon; Failed to couple up	No; Dumping	Chuggs; Failed to couple up	Rachel; Failed to couple up	Brad; Brad & Lucinda's choice to dump	Sharon; Failed to couple up	AJ; Boys' choice to dump	Georgia; Failed to couple up	Aaron F & Lucinda; Public's choice to dump	Harry, Jack, Kaila, Lillie, Medhy, Salma; Failed to couple up	No; Dumping	Amy, Clarisse; Boys' choice to dump	Abigail; Boys' choice to dump	Matthew; Failed to couple up	Brett & Priya; Public's choice to dump	Aaron S & Mary; Public's choice to dump	No; Dumping	Faye & Teddy; 14.85%% to win
Dumped	No; Dumping	Shannon; Failed to couple up	No; Dumping	Chuggs; Failed to couple up	Rachel; Failed to couple up	Brad; Brad & Lucinda's choice to dump	Sharon; Failed to couple up	Danny; Girls' choice to dump	Georgia; Failed to couple up	Aaron F & Lucinda; Public's choice to dump	Harry, Jack, Kaila, Lillie, Medhy, Salma; Failed to couple up	No; Dumping	Hugo, Sam; Girls' choice to dump	Dale; Girls' choice to dump	Matthew; Failed to couple up	Brett & Priya; Public's choice to dump	Aaron S & Mary; Public's choice to dump	No; Dumping	Chloe & Toby; 30.85% to win
Dumped	No; Dumping	Shannon; Failed to couple up	No; Dumping	Chuggs; Failed to couple up	Rachel; Failed to couple up	Brad; Brad & Lucinda's choice to dump	Sharon; Failed to couple up	Danny; Girls' choice to dump	Georgia; Failed to couple up	Aaron F & Lucinda; Public's choice to dump	Harry, Jack, Kaila, Lillie, Medhy, Salma; Failed to couple up	No; Dumping	Hugo, Sam; Girls' choice to dump	Dale; Girls' choice to dump	Matthew; Failed to couple up	Brett & Priya; Public's choice to dump	Aaron S & Mary; Public's choice to dump	No; Dumping	Liam & Millie; 42.02% to win

== Weekly summary ==
The main events in the Love Island villa are summarised in the table below.

Week 1	Entrances	On Day 1, Aaron F, Brad, Chloe, Faye, Hugo, Jake, Kaz, Liberty, Shannon, Sharon and Toby entered the villa.; On Day 4, Liam and Chuggs entered the villa.; On Day 5, Rachel entered the villa.
Week 1	Coupling	On Day 1, the Islanders coupled up for the first time. After all of the girls entered, the boys were asked to choose a girl to pair up with. Faye coupled up with Brad, Kaz paired up with Toby, Liberty with Jake, Shannon with Aaron F and Sharon with Hugo.; On Day 2, Chloe, who entered after the coupling, had to steal one boy for herself. She chose Aaron F, leaving Shannon single.; On Day 5, the islanders re-coupled. This time it was the girls who had to pick a boy to pair up with. Kaz and Toby, and Liberty and Jake remained together, while Sharon chose Aaron F, Faye picked Liam, and Chloe coupled with Hugo, leaving Brad and Chuggs single. New islander Rachel then entered the villa and was told she would couple up with one of them.
Week 1	Challenges	On Day 2, the girls and the boys competed against each other in "Horny Devils", in which they had to guess which islander a fact was about. To make their guess they had to kiss that islander.
Week 1	Dates	On Day 3, Kaz and Toby left the villa to go on their first date.; On Day 4, the public voted for who they wanted new boys Chuggs and Liam to go on dates with. They picked Sharon to date Chuggs, and Faye to date Liam.
Week 1	Exits	On Day 2, following Chloe's decision to couple up with Aaron F, Shannon was left single and dumped from the island.
Week 2	Entrances	On Day 9, Lucinda and Millie entered the villa.; On Day 12, Teddy entered the villa.
Week 2	Coupling	On Day 6, Rachel had to couple up with either Brad or Chuggs, the two single islanders. She chose Brad.
Week 2	Challenges	On Day 6, the boys competed in "Undercover Lover" where they had to rescue the girl in their couple and then make them a cocktail while lying on a vibrating machine. The girls chose Brad as the winner.; On Day 8, the islanders competed in a couple's quiz, hosted by Chloe and Hugo, where they had to answer questions about the person they are coupled up with.; On Day 11, the girls competed in "Line of Booty", in which they had to perform a strip tease dressed as a police officer and then interrogate a boy of their choice by guessing what object they had hidden down their shorts and then kissing them before putting them in jail. The boys chose Kaz as the winner.
Week 2	Dates	On Day 8, all of the couples had a breakfast date in the garden.; On Day 9, new Islanders Lucinda and Millie were asked to choose three other Islanders to take on dates with each of them preparing a starter, a main course and a dessert. Lucinda chose Brad, Hugo, and Aaron F while Millie picked Aaron F, Liam, and Hugo.; On Day 12, Liberty and Jake went on their first date.; On Day 12, the islanders chose four girls to speed-date new boy Teddy. They chose Kaz, Rachel, Sharon and Faye.
Week 2	Exits	On Day 6, following Rachel's decision to couple up with Brad, Chuggs remained the only single islander and was therefore dumped.
Week 3	Entrances	On Day 17, AJ entered the villa.; On Day 18, Danny entered the villa.
Week 3	Coupling	On Day 14, the islanders recoupled. This time it was the boys turn to pick which girl they wanted to couple up with. Jake and Liberty remained together, while Aaron F picked Kaz, Brad chose Lucinda, Hugo went with Sharon, Liam coupled up with Millie, Teddy paired with Faye, and Toby picked Chloe. With Rachel being the only single islander, she was dumped.; On Day 19, the islanders recoupled. As new islanders, AJ and Danny had first pick, and chose Hugo and Lucinda respectively. It was then down to the remaining boys to pick a girl to couple up with. Jake and Liberty, Aaron F and Kaz, Liam and Millie, Teddy and Faye, and Toby and Chloe all remained together, leaving Sharon single and dumped.
Week 3	Challenges	On Day 15, the couples took part in "Spit the Roast" where they had to transfer food to each other using just their mouths.; On Day 17, the boys and girls went head-to-head in "Stags vs Hens" in a series of Stag and Hen do games. As the boys won the challenge, they were rewarded with a new female islander.
Week 3	Dates	On Day 16, Brad and Lucinda left the villa to go on their first date.; On Day 18, before entering the villa, new boy Danny chose two girls to take on dates. He picked Kaz and Sharon.
Week 3	Exits	On Day 14, Rachel was dumped from the island after failing to couple up.; On Day 16, after receiving the fewest public votes, Brad and Lucinda then had to decide amongst themselves which one of them should be dumped. They chose Brad.; On Day 19, Sharon was dumped from the island after failing to couple up.
Week 4	Entrances	On Day 23, Abigail, Georgia and Tyler entered the villa.
Week 4	Coupling	On Day 25, the islanders recoupled. This time it was the boys choosing which girl they'd like to be coupled up with. Jake and Liberty, Liam and Millie, and Teddy and Faye remained together, while Aaron F picked Lucinda, Hugo chose Chloe, Toby went for Abigail, and Tyler coupled up with Kaz. As Georgia was the only single islander, she was dumped.
Week 4	Challenges	On Day 21, the islanders took part in "Cattitude" in a game of cat and mouse, where the girls became the cats and the boys became the mice. The girls had to take their coupled boy and put them in a giant mouse trap.; On Day 22, the islanders competed in the "Snog, Marry, Pie" challenge where each islander had to snog, marry and pie an islander of the opposite gender.
Week 4	Dates	On Day 23, Faye and Teddy left the villa to go on a date.; On Day 26, Liam and Millie left the villa to go on their first date.
Week 4	Exits	On Day 23, after receiving the fewest public votes, AJ, Chloe and Lucinda, and Danny, Teddy and Toby were in danger of being dumped. The remaining Islanders had to choose one boy and one girl to dump from the island. The boys chose AJ, while the girls chose Danny.; On Day 25, Georgia was dumped from the island after failing to couple up.
Week 5	Entrances	On Day 29, Dale, Harry, Jack, Matthew, Medhy and Sam entered the Main Villa, while Amy, Clarisse, Kaila, Lillie, Mary and Salma entered Casa Amor.
Week 5	Coupling	On Day 32, the original Islanders were told that they would be re-coupling. They were only given the option to remain in their current couple or to choose one of the new Islanders. However, as the boys and the girls were living in separate villas, they were not aware of what the other one chose. If one decided to re-couple and the other did not, then they would be single but still remain on the island. If both re-coupled then they would both remain in the villa with their new partner, and any remaining single new islanders would be dumped. Jake and Liberty, and Liam and Millie remained together, while Chloe picked Dale, Faye went with Sam, Hugo coupled with Amy, Kaz decided on Matthew, Toby picked Mary, and Tyler went with Clarisse. As Abigail and Teddy's original partners failed to couple with them, they remained single. The new single islanders were then dumped from the villa.
Week 5	Challenges	On Day 28, the islanders split into two teams and competed against each other in a number of sports day events.; On Day 30, the Main Villa and Casa Amor competed in "Raunchy Races" where they had to complete a certain task quicker than the other villa. The game resulted in a draw and therefore both villas won a party for that evening.
Week 5	Exits	On Day 28, the public voted for their favourite couple. As Aaron F and Lucinda received the fewest votes, they were dumped from the island.; On Day 32, new islanders Harry, Jack, Kaila, Lillie, Medhy and Salma were dumped from the island after failing to couple up.
Week 6	Coupling	On Day 37, the islanders recoupled. This time it was the girls choosing which boy they'd like to be coupled up with. Amy and Hugo, Clarisse and Tyler, Jake and Liberty, Kaz and Matthew, and Liam and Millie all remained together, while Abigail chose Dale, Chloe reunited with Toby, Faye coupled up with Teddy, and Mary picked Sam.
Week 6	Challenges	On Day 38, the couples took part in "Playing the Field". The girls were dressed as cheerleaders, while the boys were dressed as American football players. In the first round, the boys had to defend their girl from the other islanders throwing condiments, while she attempted to score a goal. In the second round, each couple had to snog for as long as they could before the bell rang.; On Day 39, the Islanders took part in "Mad Movies" in a Boys vs. Girls pub quiz challenge where they had to answer sex related questions. The team who answered correctly were able to select a movie from the list which featured a clip of another Islander. The girls answered the most questions correctly and were therefore crowned the winners.
Week 6	Exits	On Day 38, after receiving the fewest public votes, Amy and Hugo, Clarisse and Tyler, and Mary and Sam were at risk of being dumped. It was then up to the remaining girls to choose a boy to save, while the remaining boys saved a girl. Mary and Tyler were saved from their fellow islanders, therefore Amy, Clarisse, Hugo and Sam were all dumped from the island.
Week 7	Entrances	On Day 42, Aaron S and Priya entered the villa.; On Day 44, Brett entered the villa.
Week 7	Coupling	On Day 45, the islanders recoupled. This time it was the girls choosing which boy they'd like to be coupled up with. Chloe and Toby, Faye and Teddy, Jake and Liberty, Liam and Millie all remained together, while Kaz reunited with Tyler, Mary picked Aaron S, and Priya chose Brett. As Matthew was left single, he was dumped from the island.
Week 7	Challenges	On Day 44, the boys took part in "Sex Gods". while dressed as Greek Gods, they first had to strip before carrying a large globe above their head across a pool of "lava". Finally they had to rescue the girl of their choice by doing a number of pull ups and kissing her after each rep.; On Day 46, the boys and girls went head-to-head to raise their opposing team's heart rate. At the end of the game they found out who raised their heart rate the most.; On Day 47, the islanders were asked to predict where the public ranked them in a series of categories.
Week 7	Dates	On Day 42, new islanders Aaron S and Priya each picked two people to take on dates. Aaron S chose Mary and Chloe, while Priya picked Teddy and Matthew.; On Day 44, new islander Brett was asked to take one of the girls on a date. He chose Priya.
Week 7	Exits	On Day 42, after receiving the fewest public votes, Abigail, Kaz and Mary, and Dale, Jake and Tyler were in danger of being dumped. The remaining Islanders had to choose one boy and one girl to dump from the island. The boys chose Abigail, while the girls chose Dale.; On Day 45, Matthew was dumped after failing to couple up.
Week 8	Challenges	On Day 52, the islanders were challenged with looking after a baby doll. The challenge was won by Aaron S and Mary.
Week 8	Dates	On Day 53, Faye and Teddy, and Kaz and Tyler, and Liam and Millie went on their final dates.; On Day 54, Jake and Liberty, and Chloe and Toby went on their final dates.
Week 8	Exits	On Day 50, following the islanders voted for the two least compatible couples the previous day, Faye and Teddy, Liberty and Jake, Mary and Aaron S, and Priya and Brett, who all received votes went head-to-head with each other in a public vote to save. It was then revealed that having received the fewest public votes, Priya and Brett had been dumped.; On Day 52, after receiving the fewest public votes, Aaron S and Mary were dumped from the island.; On Day 54, Jake and Liberty decided to voluntarily leave the villa following their break-up.

== Ratings ==
Official ratings are taken from BARB which include ITV2 +1 and any playback within 7 days of the original broadcast. Because the Saturday episodes are "Unseen Bits" episodes rather than nightly highlights, these are not included in the overall averages. Week 3’s Sunday episode which aired on 11 July went up against 30 million viewers watching the UEFA Euro 2020 Final.

	Viewers (millions)								
	Week 1	Week 2	Week 3	Week 4	Week 5	Week 6	Week 7	Week 8	Week 9
Sunday		3.94	2.97	3.80	4.10	4.46	4.38	3.44	3.80
Monday	4.81	4.17	4.24	4.02	4.05	4.40	4.62	4.17	4.08
Tuesday	4.99	4.09	4.03	3.86	4.25	4.74	4.17	4.27	
Wednesday	4.55	3.79	4.22	3.95	4.10	4.51	3.93	3.98	
Thursday	4.34	4.15	3.97	4.10	4.25	4.46	4.02	4.29	
Friday	4.36	4.23	3.65	4.02	4.74	4.91	4.19	4.26	
Weekly average	4.61	4.06	3.85	3.95	4.25	4.58	4.22	4.07	3.94
Running average	4.61	4.33	4.17	4.11	4.14	4.22	4.22	4.20	4.17
Series average	4.17								
Unseen Bits		0.98	0.96	0.61	0.88	0.87	1.31	0.96	1.01
Aftersun		0.70	0.52	0.82	0.97	1.35	1.25	0.77	1.01
