= Faye Winter =

English television personality

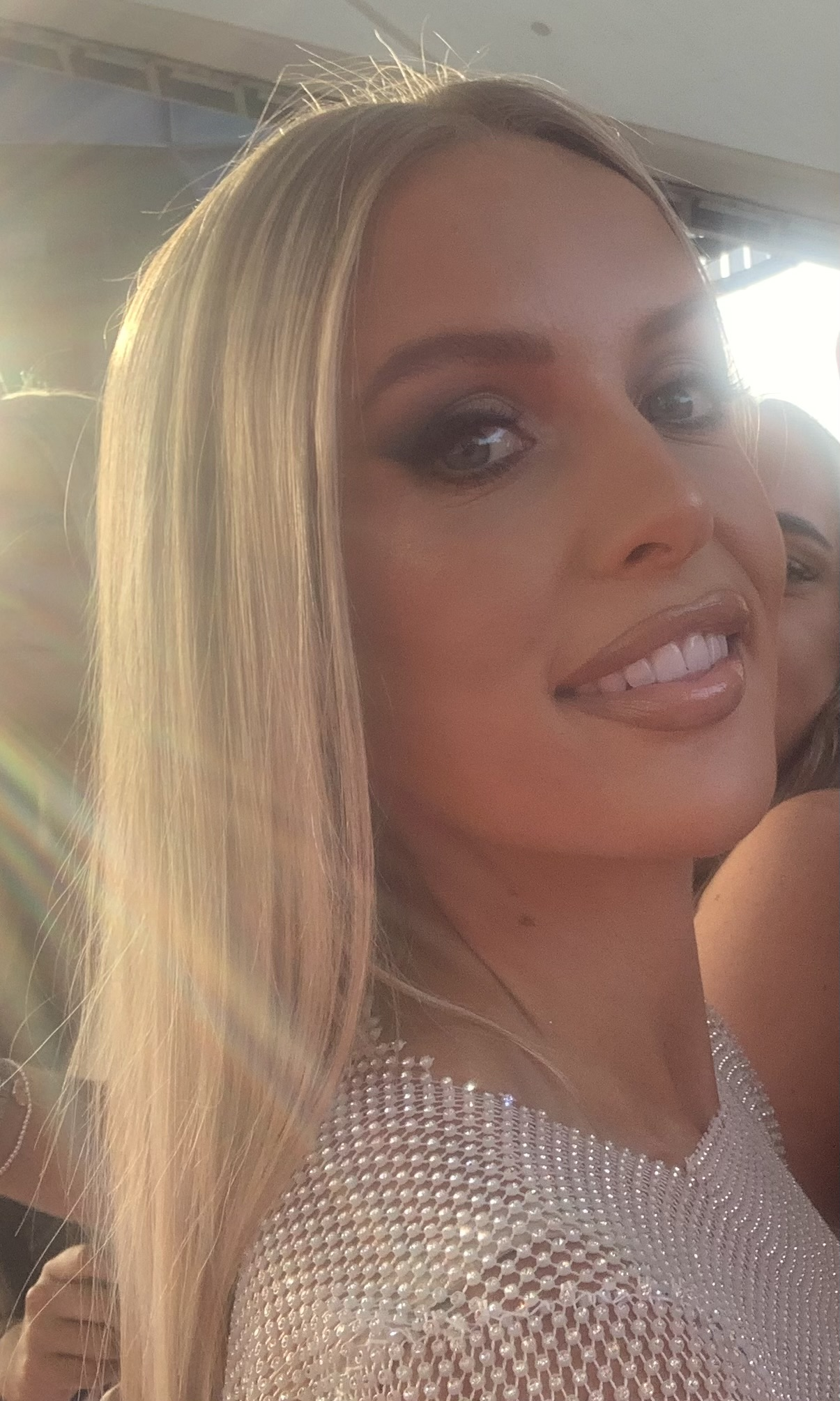
- Winter in 2023
- Born: Faye Nicole Winter; 21 June 1995 (age 30); Exeter, Devon, England
- Occupation: Television personality
- Years active: 2021–present
- Television: Love Island; Celebrity MasterChef

Faye Nicole Winter (born 21 June 1995) is an English television personality. In 2021, she was a finalist on the seventh series of Love Island and in 2022, she appeared as a contestant on Celebrity MasterChef.

== Life and career ==
Winter was born on 21 June 1995 in Exeter, Devon. Prior to fame, she worked as an estate agent and lettings manager for the three-branch agency East of Exe. In June 2021, she became a contestant on the seventh series of Love Island. Earlier in the series, she was paired with Brad McClelland and Liam Reardon before coupling up with Teddy Soares on Day 14, whom she remained with until the Casa Amor episode when she briefly coupled up with Sam Jackson, before returning to Soares and ultimately finishing in third place with him. Winter's behaviour during the series sparked numerous complaints to Ofcom, with one argument between her and Soares culminating 25,000 complaints. After leaving the series, Winter and Soares appeared on Love Island: Aftersun and Lorraine to discuss their experience, with Winter apologising for her behaviour. Winter later revealed she had been attending therapy due to the comments viewers had made about her following the show. In August 2022, Winter began appearing as a contestant on Celebrity MasterChef. Following two successful rounds, she made it through to the semi-finals.

== Filmography ==
As herself
Year	Title	Notes	Ref.
2021	Love Island	Contestant; series 7	
2021	Love Island: Aftersun	Guest appearance	
2021	Lorraine	Guest appearance	
2022	Celebrity MasterChef	Contestant	
