= Priya Serrao =

Australian lawyer of Indian origin and beauty queen (born 1992)

- Born: 22 June 1992 (age 34); Belmannu, India
- Citizenship: Australia
- Education: The Mac.Robertson Girls' High School; Melbourne Law School
- Occupation: Lawyer
- Beauty pageant titleholder
- Title: Miss Universe Australia 2019
- Major competitions: Miss Universe Australia 2019 (Winner); Miss Universe 2019 (Unplaced)

Priya Olivia Serrao (born 22 June 1992) is an Australian lawyer, public policy and beauty pageant titleholder who was crowned Miss Universe Australia 2019 living in Melbourne. She represented Australia in the Miss Universe 2019 competition. She is the first Indian-born Miss Universe Australia.

== Early life ==
Serrao was born in Belmannu, Karnataka, to a Mangalorean Catholic family, and spent most of her early childhood living in Oman and the United Arab Emirates. When she was 11, the family immigrated to Australia and settled in Melbourne and attended high school in the Mac.Robertsons' High School. She has two university degrees: one in arts from Monash University and one in law from Melbourne Law School. In 2016, she completed an internship in Timor-Leste with the UN Development Programme. Serrao works as a policy adviser for the Government of Victoria, and was to be admitted to the Supreme Court of Victoria as a lawyer in 2019.

== Pageantry ==
Serrao began her pageantry career at the Miss Universe Australia 2019 competition. She was later selected as one of the national finalists in the competition for the state of Victoria on 10 March 2019. Serrao competed in the final on 27 June 2019, and won, beating first runner-up Bella Kasimba of Western Australia. She then represented Australia in the Miss Universe 2019 competition on 9 December 2019, but was unplaced.

Awards and achievements
Preceded by (New South Wales) Francesca Hung	Miss Universe Australia; 2019	Succeeded by (Victoria (state)) Maria Thattil
