= Tom Clare (footballer) =

English footballer (born 1999)

Thomas Clare
Personal information
- Date of birth: 2 September 1999 (age 27)
- Place of birth: Barnsley, England
- Position: Forward

Team information
- Current team: Hyde United

Youth career
- 2007–2018: Barnsley
- 2018–2019: Bradford City

Senior career*
Years	Team	Apps	(Gls)
2018–2019	Bradford City	0	(0)
2018–2019	→ Boston United (loan)	7	(3)
2019	Boston United	5	(0)
2019	→ Frickley Athletic (loan)		
2020	Bradford (Park Avenue)	10	(5)
2020	Buxton		
2020–2021	Pontefract Collieries	10	(17)
2021–2023	Macclesfield	47	(27)
2024–2026	Macclesfield	18	(3)
2026–	Hyde United	0	(0)
- * Club domestic league appearances and goals as of 13:40, 1 July 2026 (UTC)

Thomas Patrick Clare (born 2 September 1999) is an English footballer and reality TV contestant who plays as a forward for Hyde United.

In 2023, he came third place on the ninth series of Love Island. In 2024, he won the first series of Love Island: All Stars, alongside his girlfriend Molly Smith. In February 2026, the couple became the new hosts of the NearlyWeds podcast, succeeding Jamie Laing and Sophie Habboo.

== Football career ==
Clare came through the academy at Barnsley and joined Bradford City in 2018 but never made an appearance for the first team. He joined Boston United initially on loan from Bradford, before signing a contract with them in June 2019. After a loan spell with Frickley Athletic, Clare left Boston in November 2019. Having spent time at Bradford (Park Avenue), Buxton and Pontefract Collieries, Clare was one of Macclesfield FC's first signings when the club reformed and he signed a contract with the club in June 2021. He was top scorer during Macclesfield's 2021–22 season with 23 goals and he signed a new 2-year contract in the spring of 2022.

In March 2024 he returned to former club Macclesfield.

On 1 July 2026, Clare joined Northern Premier League Premier Division club Hyde United.

== Love Island ==
Clare was given permission by his club to leave Macclesfield mid-season in January 2023 to appear as a contestant on the ninth series of the ITV2 reality dating television show, Love Island. Macclesfield director of football Robbie Savage reportedly gave his support and advice to Clare about the television appearance.

In January 2024, Clare won the first series of Love Island: All Stars, alongside girlfriend Molly Smith. In September 2025, the couple became engaged.

== Honours ==
Macclesfield

- NPL Division One West 2022–23
- NWCFL Premier Division: 2021–22
