= Love Island (2015 TV series) series 6 =

2020 series of Love Island

Love Island
- Series 6
- Presented by: Laura Whitmore
- No. of days: 44
- No. of contestants: 32
- Winners: Finn Tapp; Paige Turley
- Runners-up: Siânnise Fudge; Luke Trotman
- Companion show: Love Island: Aftersun
- No. of episodes: 36

Release
- Original network: ITV2
- Original release: 12 January – 23 February 2020

Series chronology
- ← Previous; Series 5 Next → Series 7

The sixth series of Love Island began broadcasting on 12 January 2020, on ITV2. The series was announced on 24 July 2019, when it was confirmed that two seasons would air in 2020, and this is also the first winter edition of the seasons. Unlike the summer edition, the luxury villa is located in Cape Town. This series is also the first to be hosted by Laura Whitmore, who has taken over from Caroline Flack. The series is narrated by Iain Stirling.

On 15 February 2020, following the death of former presenter Caroline Flack, the Unseen Bits episode due to air that day was not broadcast; but was made available on the ITV Hub. The regular episode did not air the following day either. The show returned on 17 February with a tribute to Flack. On the same day, ITV2 confirmed that the companion series Love Island: Aftersun, which was set to air after that episode's main show, would not be broadcast. A further tribute to Flack aired during the final on 23 February, which featured a compilation of her time throughout her five series as host.

On 23 February 2020, the series was won by Finn Tapp and Paige Turley, who received 44.52% of the final vote. Siânnise Fudge and Luke Trotman finished as runners-up with 43.61% of the vote, making it the closest voting percentage between the final two couples ever with less than 1% between them.

Musician Sean Paul makes an appearance in the Villa during the season.

== Production ==
The first 10-second trailer for the series aired on 2 December 2019, featured the tagline "Do one, winter." It was then followed by a full-length trailer that used the song "Lose Control" by Meduza, Becky Hill & Goodboys which was released on 6 December 2019, and featured Caroline Flack. On 17 December 2019, Flack announced that she would be standing down as host following allegations of assault against her boyfriend. On 20 December, it was announced that fellow TV presenter Laura Whitmore would be her replacement. She also took on the role of presenting Love Island: Aftersun, which for the first time aired every Monday after the main show rather than its usual Sunday slot.

=== Villa ===
For the first winter edition of the show, the Islanders stayed at the Midden Cottage, located in the "ultra-wealthy" Constantia suburb of Cape Town.

== Islanders ==
The Islanders for the sixth series were released on 6 January 2020, just six days before the launch. These include Eve and Jess Gale, who are the second set of twins to compete in the show following John and Tony Alberti in 2015. The series was won by Finn Tapp and Paige Turley.

Islander	Age	Hometown	Entered	Exited	Status	Ref
Finn Tapp	20	Milton Keynes	Day 5	Day 44	Winner	
Paige Turley	22	Fauldhouse	Day 1	Day 44	Winner	
Luke Trotman	22	Luton	Day 12	Day 44	Runner-up	
Siânnise Fudge	25	Bristol	Day 1	Day 44	Runner-up	
Demi Jones	21	Portsmouth	Day 16	Day 44	Third place	
Luke Mabbott	24	Redcar	Day 12	Day 44	Third place	
Ched Uzor	23	Bury St Edmunds	Day 23	Day 44	Fourth place	
Jess Gale	20	Cambridge	Day 1	Day 44	Fourth place	
Mike Boateng	24	London	Day 1	Day 41	Dumped	
Priscilla Anyabu	25	Battersea	Day 23	Day 41	Dumped	
Callum Jones	23	Manchester	Day 1	Day 38	Dumped	
Molly Smith	25	Manchester	Day 23	Day 38	Dumped	
Jamie Clayton	28	Edinburgh	Day 31	Day 38	Dumped	
Natalia Zoppa	20	Manchester	Day 23	Day 38	Dumped	
Shaughna Phillips	25	London	Day 1	Day 33	Dumped	
Eva Zapico	21	Bromley	Day 23	Day 30	Dumped	
Nas Majeed	23	London	Day 1	Day 30	Dumped	
Jordan Waobikeze	24	London	Day 23	Day 30	Dumped	
Rebecca Gormley	21	Newcastle	Day 9	Day 30	Dumped	
Alexi Eraclides	23	Essex	Day 23	Day 26	Dumped	
Biggs Chris	27	Glasgow	Day 23	Day 26	Dumped	
George Day	27	Southampton	Day 23	Day 26	Dumped	
Jade Affleck	25	Yarm	Day 23	Day 26	Dumped	
Jamie McCann	25	Stevenston	Day 23	Day 26	Dumped	
Josh Kempton	21	Camberley	Day 23	Day 26	Dumped	
Sophie Piper	21	Essex	Day 1	Day 22	Dumped	
Wallace Wilson	24	Inverness	Day 16	Day 22	Dumped	
Leanne Amaning	22	London	Day 1	Day 18	Dumped	
Connor Durman	25	Brighton	Day 1	Day 15	Dumped	
Connagh Howard	27	Cardiff	Day 5	Day 13	Dumped	
Eve Gale	20	Cambridge	Day 1	Day 6	Dumped	
Ollie Williams	23	Lanhydrock	Day 1	Day 4	Walked	

=== Future appearances ===
In 2023, Mike Boateng appeared on season one of Love Island Games.

In 2024, Eve Gale, Jess Gale, Callum Jones, Demi Jones, Sophie Piper, and Molly Smith all returned for series one of Love Island: All Stars.

In 2025, Nas Majeed appeared on series two of Love Island: All Stars.

In 2026, Leanne Amaning returned for series three of Love Island: All Stars.

== Coupling and elimination history ==
	Week 1			Week 2	Week 3		Week 4		Week 5		Week 6		
	Day 1	Day 2	Day 6	Day 13	Day 15	Day 18	Day 22	Day 26	Day 30	Day 33	Day 38	Day 41	Final
Finn	Not in Villa		Paige	Paige	Safe	Paige	Safe	Paige	Safe	Paige	Safe	Finalist	Winner (Day 44)
Paige	Ollie		Finn	Finn	Safe	Finn	Safe	Finn	Safe	Finn	Safe	Finalist	Winner (Day 44)
Luke T	Not in Villa			Rebecca	Safe	Siânnise	Saved	Siânnise	Safe	Siânnise	Safe	Finalist	Runner-up (Day 44)
Siânnise	Nas		Connor	Nas	Safe	Luke T	Saved	Luke T	Safe	Luke T	Safe	Finalist	Runner-up (Day 44)
Demi	Not in Villa					Nas	Safe	Single	Immune	Luke M	Vulnerable / Safe	Finalist	Third place (Day 44)
Luke M	Not in Villa			Jess	Safe	Jess	Saved	Natalia	Safe	Demi	Vulnerable / Safe	Finalist	Third place (Day 44)
Ched	Not in Villa							Jess	Vulnerable	Jess	Vulnerable / Safe	Finalist	Fourth place (Day 44)
Jess	Not in Villa	Mike	Nas	Luke M	Safe	Luke M	Saved	Ched	Vulnerable	Ched	Vulnerable / Safe	Finalist	Fourth place (Day 44)
Mike	Leanne	Jess	Leanne	Leanne	Safe	Sophie	Vulnerable	Priscilla	Safe	Priscilla	Vulnerable	Eliminated	Dumped (Day 41)
Priscilla	Not in Villa							Mike	Safe	Mike	Vulnerable	Eliminated	Dumped (Day 41)
Callum	Shaughna	Eve	Shaughna	Shaughna	Safe	Shaughna	Safe	Molly	Safe	Molly	Vulnerable	Dumped (Day 38)	
Molly	Not in Villa							Callum	Safe	Callum	Vulnerable	Dumped (Day 38)	
Jamie C	Not in Villa									Natalia	Eliminated	Dumped (Day 38)	
Natalia	Not in Villa							Luke M	Safe	Jamie C	Eliminated	Dumped (Day 38)	
Shaughna	Callum	Single	Callum	Callum	Safe	Callum	Safe	Single	Immune	Single	Dumped (Day 33)		
Eva	Not in Villa							Nas	Eliminated	Dumped (Day 30)			
Nas	Siânnise		Jess	Siânnise	Safe	Demi	Safe	Eva	Eliminated	Dumped (Day 30)			
Jordan	Not in Villa							Rebecca	Eliminated	Dumped (Day 30)			
Rebecca	Not in Villa			Luke T	Safe	Wallace	Vulnerable	Jordan	Eliminated	Dumped (Day 30)			
Alexi	Not in Villa							Single	Dumped (Day 26)				
Biggs	Not in Villa							Single	Dumped (Day 26)				
George	Not in Villa							Single	Dumped (Day 26)				
Jade	Not in Villa							Single	Dumped (Day 26)				
Jamie M	Not in Villa							Single	Dumped (Day 26)				
Josh	Not in Villa							Single	Dumped (Day 26)				
Sophie	Connor		Connagh	Connor	Vulnerable	Mike	Vulnerable	Dumped (Day 22)					
Wallace	Not in Villa					Rebecca	Vulnerable	Dumped (Day 22)					
Leanne	Mike	Single	Mike	Mike	Safe	Single	Dumped (Day 18)						
Connor	Sophie		Siânnise	Sophie	Vulnerable	Dumped (Day 15)							
Connagh	Not in Villa		Sophie	Single	Dumped (Day 13)								
Eve	Not in Villa	Callum	Single	Dumped (Day 6)									
Ollie	Paige		Walked (Day 4)										
Walked	none		Ollie	none									
Dumped	No; Dumping		Eve; Failed to couple up	Connagh; Failed to couple up	Connor; Islanders' choice to dump	Leanne; Failed to couple up	Sophie, Wallace; Islanders' choice to dump	Alexi, Biggs, George, Jade, Jamie M, Josh; Failed to couple up	Eva & Nas, Jordan & Rebecca; Public's choice to dump	Shaughna; Failed to couple up	Jamie C & Natalia; Public's choice to dump	Mike & Priscilla; Public's choice to dump	Ched & Jess; 2.25% to win
Dumped	No; Dumping		Eve; Failed to couple up	Connagh; Failed to couple up	Connor; Islanders' choice to dump	Leanne; Failed to couple up	Sophie, Wallace; Islanders' choice to dump	Alexi, Biggs, George, Jade, Jamie M, Josh; Failed to couple up	Eva & Nas, Jordan & Rebecca; Public's choice to dump	Shaughna; Failed to couple up	Jamie C & Natalia; Public's choice to dump	Mike & Priscilla; Public's choice to dump	Demi & Luke M 9.62% to win
Dumped	No; Dumping		Eve; Failed to couple up	Connagh; Failed to couple up	Connor; Islanders' choice to dump	Leanne; Failed to couple up	Sophie, Wallace; Islanders' choice to dump	Alexi, Biggs, George, Jade, Jamie M, Josh; Failed to couple up	Eva & Nas, Jordan & Rebecca; Public's choice to dump	Shaughna; Failed to couple up	Callum & Molly; Islanders' choice to dump	Mike & Priscilla; Public's choice to dump	Luke T & Siânnise; 43.61% to win
Dumped	No; Dumping		Eve; Failed to couple up	Connagh; Failed to couple up	Connor; Islanders' choice to dump	Leanne; Failed to couple up	Sophie, Wallace; Islanders' choice to dump	Alexi, Biggs, George, Jade, Jamie M, Josh; Failed to couple up	Eva & Nas, Jordan & Rebecca; Public's choice to dump	Shaughna; Failed to couple up	Callum & Molly; Islanders' choice to dump	Mike & Priscilla; Public's choice to dump	Finn & Paige; 44.52% to win

== Weekly summary ==
The main events in the Love Island villa are summarised in the table below.

Week 1	Entrances	On Day 1, Callum, Connor, Eve, Jess, Leanne, Mike, Nas, Ollie, Paige, Shaughna, Siânnise and Sophie entered the villa.; On Day 5, Connagh and Finn entered the villa.
Week 1	Coupling	On Day 1, the Islanders coupled up for the first time. After all of the girls entered, the boys were asked to choose a girl to pair up with. Leanne coupled up with Mike, Paige paired up with Ollie, Shaughna with Callum, Siânnise with Nas and Sophie with Connor.; On Day 2, Eve and Jess were each allowed to steal a boy from a couple. Eve chose Callum, whereas Jess chose Mike, leaving Leanne and Shaughna single.; On Day 6, the islanders re-coupled. This time it was the boys who had to pick a girl to pair up with. Callum and Shaughna, and Mike and Leanne reunited, while Connagh chose Sophie, Connor picked Siânnise, Finn went with Paige, and Nas coupled with Jess. As Eve remained single, she was dumped from the island.
Week 1	Challenges	On Day 2, the girls and the boys competed against each other in "Spill the Tea", in which they had to guess which islander a fact was about. To make their guess they had to kiss that islander.; On Day 6, the girls competed in a "Booty-camp" challenge where they had to take on an obstacle course then finish by kissing a boy of their choice. Siânnise won the challenge.
Week 1	Dates	On Day 2, as the newest couples, Jess and Mike, and Eve and Callum went on a double date.; On Day 5, new Islanders Connagh and Finn were asked to choose two other Islanders to take on dates. Connagh chose Sophie and Shaughna, whilst Finn picked Siânnise and Paige.
Week 1	Exits	On Day 4, Ollie decided to voluntarily leave the villa.; On Day 6, Eve was dumped from the island after failing to couple up.
Week 2	Entrances	On Day 9, Rebecca entered the villa.; On Day 12, Luke M and Luke T entered the villa.
Week 2	Coupling	On Day 13, the islanders re-coupled. This time it was the girls who had to pick a boy to couple up with. Callum and Shaughna, Finn and Paige, and Mike and Leanne remained together, while Connor and Sophie, and Nas and Siânnise reunited. Jess went with Luke M, and Rebecca coupled with Luke T. As Connagh remained single, he was dumped from the island.
Week 2	Challenges	On Day 8, the islanders competed in a couples quiz where they had to answer questions about the person they are coupled up with. The quiz was won by Finn and Paige.; On Day 9, the boys and girls competed in a challenge where they had to raise their opposing team's heart rate. At the end of the game they found out who raised their heart rate the most. Rebecca also entered the villa during this challenge as a surprise to the islanders.
Week 2	Dates	On Day 9, Leanne and Mike left the villa to go on their first date.; On Day 9, after raising their heart rate the most, Rebecca dated both Callum and Connor in the hideaway.; On Day 12, the public voted for who they wanted new boys Luke M and Luke T to go on dates with. They picked Jess to date Luke M, and Siânnise to date Luke T.; On Day 13, new Islanders Luke M and Luke T were asked to choose two other Islanders to take on dates. Luke M chose Paige and Sophie, whilst Luke T picked Leanne and Rebecca.
Week 2	Exits	On Day 13, Connagh was dumped from the island after failing to couple up.
Week 3	Entrances	On Day 16, Demi and Wallace entered the villa.
Week 3	Coupling	On Day 18, the islanders re-coupled. This time it was the boys who had to pick a boy to couple up with. Callum and Shaughna, Finn and Paige, and Luke M and Jess remained together, while Luke T went with Siânnise, Wallace coupled with Rebecca, Nas chose Demi, and Mike picked Sophie. As Leanne remained single, she was dumped from the island.
Week 3	Challenges	On Day 16, the islanders competed in "Getting Trollied" where they had to transfer food to each other using their mouths. Callum and Shaughna won the challenge.; On Day 19, the islanders competed in the "Speedy Sex Positions" challenge. It was won by Nas and Demi.; On Day 20, the islanders competed in the "Oktobersesh" challenge featuring Oktoberfest inspired games. It was won by Paige and Finn.
Week 3	Dates	On Day 15, Callum and Shaughna left the villa to go on their first date.; On Day 16, new islanders Demi and Wallace were asked to choose three other islanders to take on dates. Demi chose Finn, Luke M and Nas, whilst Wallace chose Siânnise, Paige and Sophie.
Week 3	Exits	On Day 15, after the public voted for their favourite couple, it was announced that Connor and Sophie were the couple with the fewest votes. It was then up to the safe islanders to pick which of the two to dump. They chose Connor.; On Day 18, Leanne was dumped from the island after failing to couple up.
Week 4	Entrances	On Day 23, Alexi, Biggs, Ched, George, Jordan and Josh entered the Main Villa, whilst Eva, Jade, Jamie M, Molly, Natalia and Priscilla joined the boys in Casa Amor.
Week 4	Challenges	On Day 22, the islanders competed in the "Snog, Marry, Pie" challenge where each islander had to snog, marry and pie an islander of the opposite gender.; On Day 23, the Main Villa and Casa Amor competed in a game to make cocktails by passing ingredients from one end of a line to the other by mouth alone. The challenge was won by Casa Amor.; On Day 24, the Main Villa and Casa Amor competed in "Raunchy Races" where they had to complete a certain task quicker than the other villa. The Main Villa won the challenge and won a party for that evening.
Week 4	Coupling	On Day 26, the original Islanders were told that they would be re-coupling. They were only given the option to remain in their current couple or to choose one of the new Islanders. However, as the boys and the girls were living in separate villas, they were not aware of what the other one chose. If one decided to re-couple and the other did not, then they would be single but still remain on the island. If both re-coupled then they would both remain in the villa with their new partner, and any remaining single new islanders would be dumped. Already single, islanders Rebecca and Mike chose to couple up with Jordan and Priscilla respectively. Finn and Paige, and Luke T and Siânnise remained together. Callum picked Molly, Jess chose Ched, Luke M coupled up with Natalia, and Nas went with Eva. As Demi and Shaughna's original partners failed to recouple with them, they were now single. The new single islanders were then dumped from the villa.
Week 4	Exits	On Day 22, the islanders voted anonymously for the two least compatible couples. As Jess and Luke M, Rebecca and Wallace, Siânnise and Luke T, Sophie and Mike all received votes, they went head-to-head with each other in a public vote to save. It was then revealed that Rebecca and Wallace, and Sophie and Mike had received the fewest and were therefore at risk. It was then up to the safe islanders to decide which one from each at risk couple to dump. They chose Sophie and Wallace.; On Day 26, new islanders Alexi, Biggs, George, Jade, Jamie M and Josh were dumped from the island after failing to couple up.
Week 5	Entrances	On Day 31, Jamie entered the villa.
Week 5	Coupling	On Day 33 there was a recoupling where the boys chose. Finn and Paige, Luke T and Siânnise, Callum and Molly, Mike and Priscilla and Jess and Ched remained together. Jamie chose Natalia and Luke M chose Demi. As a result, Shaughna remained single and was dumped.
Week 5	Challenges	On Day 30 the girls competed in the "Girl Racers" challenge where the girls had to complete a course blindfolded guided by a boy. The challenge was won by Paige and Finn.; On Day 31, the islanders competed in "Rumpy Pumpy" where islanders competed against each other to pump up balloons with their bodies and answer a sexy question. The Blue team won which consisted of Callum, Ched, Luke M, Paige, Priscilla, Shaughna and Siânnise.; On Day 32, the islanders competed in "News Splash" where they had to fill in the blanks in news headlines with incorrect answers resulting in getting dunked in a water tank.; On Day 34, the islanders competed in the 'Valentines Bae' challenge where they had to complete an obstacle course whilst carrying a romantic meal. The challenge was won by Luke M and Demi.
Week 5	Dates	On Day 31, new islander Jamie had to take two girls on dates. He chose Shaughna and Demi.; On Day 32, Jess and Ched went on their first date.; On Day 34, Luke M and Demi went on their first date.
Week 5	Exits	On Day 30, the public voted for their favourite couple. As Rebecca and Jordan, and Nas and Eva received the fewest votes they were dumped from the villa.; On Day 33, Shaughna was dumped from the villa for failing to couple up.
Week 6	Challenges	On Day 37, the islanders had to vote for another couple in a number of different categories. For every vote a couple received, they earned a point. As the categories were negative traits, the couple with the lowest votes won the challenge. This was Ched and Jess.; On Day 40, the boys had to collectively complete five undercover assignments without the girls knowing.
Week 6	Dates	On Day 39, Mike and Priscilla, Finn and Paige, Ched and Jess went on their final dates.; On Day 40, Demi and Luke M, and Siânnise and Luke T went on their final dates.
Week 6	Exits	On Day 38, following the islanders voted for the two least compatible couples the previous day, Demi and Luke M, Jess and Ched, Molly and Callum, Natalia and Jamie, and Priscilla and Mike who all received votes went head-to-head with each other in a public vote to save. It was then revealed that having received the fewest votes, Natalia and Jamie had been dumped. Molly and Callum, and Mike and Priscilla were also still at risk, and it was up to the safe islanders to decide which couple to save. They ultimately chose to dump Molly and Callum.; On Day 41, the public voted for their favourite couple. Mike and Priscilla received the fewest votes and were therefore dumped from the villa.

== Ratings ==
Official ratings are taken from BARB and include ITV2 +1. Catch-up service totals are added to the official ratings. Because the Saturday episodes are weekly catch-up episodes rather than nightly highlights, these are not included in the overall averages. The week 6 Sunday episode did not air due to the passing of former host Caroline Flack.

	Viewers (millions)						
	Week 1	Week 2	Week 3	Week 4	Week 5	Week 6	
Sunday	4.84	4.00	3.97	4.17	4.00		3.62
Monday	4.58	4.08	3.76	4.01	3.81	3.80	
Tuesday	4.38	3.98	3.71	3.92	3.96	3.37	
Wednesday	4.18	3.93	3.96	4.16	4.00	3.25	
Thursday	4.18	3.81	3.78	4.20	3.89	3.34	
Friday	4.05	4.01	3.71	4.63	4.13	3.30	
Weekly average	4.37	3.97	3.82	4.18	3.97	3.45	
Running average	4.37	4.17	4.05	4.09	4.06	3.96	
Series average	3.96						
Unseen Bits		1.05	1.00	1.02	1.19		1.02
Aftersun	0.93	1.04	0.91	1.39	1.03		

== Controversy ==
Viewers called for contestant Ollie Williams to be axed after pictures were obtained by The Sun showing him posing next to animal corpses from endangered species in South Africa. A representative of Williams claimed he is a "conservationist and worked with an anti-poaching unit in Mozambique" culling sick animals, while Metro reported Williams is the director of Cornish Sporting Agency, a hunting business. In since-deleted images on his social media, Williams posed with dead animals alongside his clients. A Change.org petition was started to remove Williams from the series. Regulator Ofcom received 272 complaints after the first airing, 231 of which regarding Williams inclusion on the show.
