= India Reynolds =

English model and television personality (born 1998)

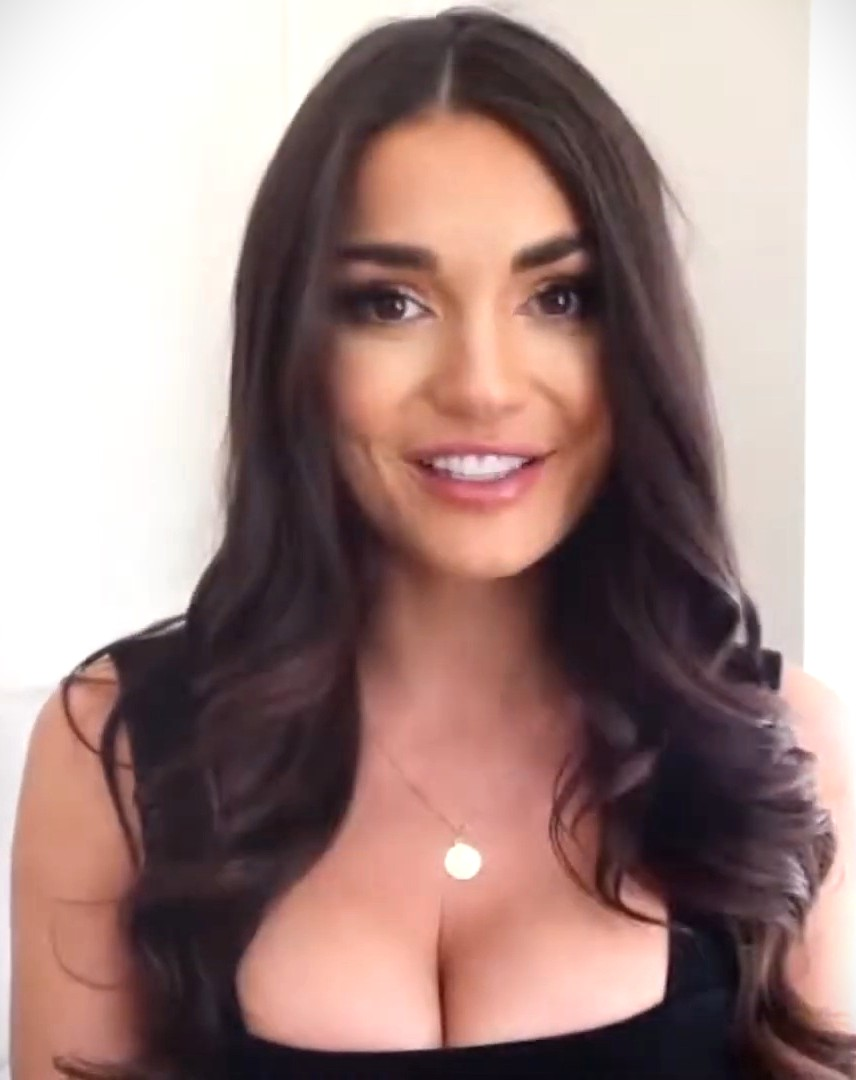
- Reynolds on OnlyFans in 2021
- Born: 20 December 1990 (age 35); Reading, Berkshire, England
- Occupations: Model; television personality
- Years active: 2009–present
- Known for: The Sun Page 3 Love Island; Love Island: All Stars

India Reynolds (born 20 December 1990) is an English model and television personality. She began her career as a glamour model, appearing in shoots for Page 3, as well as lad mags including Nuts, FHM and Zoo, before taking part in the fifth series of Love Island in 2019. In 2025, she appeared on the second series of Love Island: All Stars.

== Life and career ==
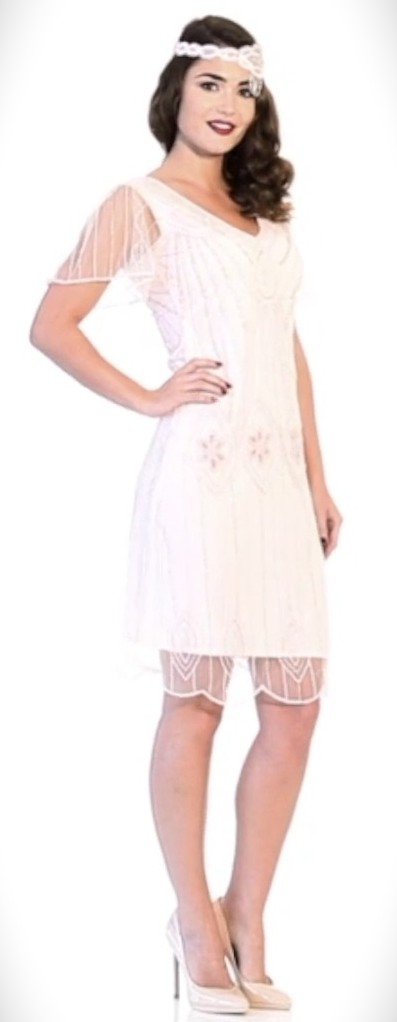
Reynolds modeling in 2017

India Reynolds Painter was born on 20 December 1990 in Reading, Berkshire. Whilst studying her A-levels at Thames Valley University, she embarked on a career as a glamour model and became The Sun's Page 3 idol in 2009, after which she dropped out of university to model full time. She subsequently went on to appear in various lads' mags including Nuts, FHM, Loaded and Zoo.

In 2019, she became a contestant on the fifth series of the ITV2 reality dating show Love Island, entering the villa as one of the final "bombshells" on Day 44, two weeks before the series concluded. She subsequently coupled up with Ovie Soko, and the pair reached the final, finishing in third place. Reynolds and Soko subsequently began a relationship and appeared in an episode of Supermarket Sweep, featuring several of their other Love Island co-stars. They split however three months later. In 2025, it was announced that Reynolds would return to Love Island to appear as a contestant on the second series of Love Island: All Stars.

== Filmography ==
As herself
Year	Title	Notes	Ref.
2019	Love Island	Contestant; series 5	
2019	Supermarket Sweep	Guest; 1 episode	
2025	Love Island: All Stars	Contestant; series 2	
