= Love Island: All Stars series 1 =

2024 series of Love Island: All Stars

Love Island: All Stars
- Series 1
- Presented by: Maya Jama
- No. of days: 37
- No. of contestants: 25
- Winners: Tom Clare; Molly Smith
- Runners-up: Jess Gale; Callum Jones
- No. of episodes: 36

Release
- Original network: ITV2; ITV (launch show)
- Original release: 15 January – 19 February 2024

Series chronology
- Next → Series 2

The first series of Love Island: All Stars is a spin-off of the dating game show Love Island featuring former contestants from previous series. It began broadcasting on 15 January 2024 with the launch episode airing across both ITV and ITV2 for the first time in the show's history. Maya Jama returned to present the series, with Iain Stirling again returning as narrator. The series is the shortest in the show's history, ending after 36 days on 19 February 2024. It was won by Molly Smith and Tom Clare, who were previously contestants on the sixth and ninth series respectively.

== Production ==
In August 2023, after ITV had aired two series of Love Island in the same year for the first time, it was reported that the winter series had been axed for 2024 and that an "All Stars" version was set to serve as its replacement. Several rumours of an "All Stars" series being in development had been reported in various news outlets. In September 2023, the commissioning of Love Island: All Stars was officially announced by ITV. The show was filmed in the same villa as the ninth series in Franschhoek, South Africa and featured a line-up consisting of former contestants from the previous ten series. The programme has included returning contestants before, with Adam Collard, who was a contestant on the fourth series and Kady McDermott who was a contestant on the second series returning as "bombshells" in the eighth and tenth series of the show respectively. This series is the first to feature a line-up consisting of only returning contestants.

The first teaser for the series aired in December 2023, during the final of the twenty-third series of I'm a Celebrity...Get Me Out of Here! and featured a shadow of host Jama walking out onto a set dimly lit by spotlights, followed by a red curtain covering the screen accompanied by the show's theme tune, which revealed the new Love Island: All Stars. Further trailers were released throughout the month, the first of which featured Jama being fitted into a dress and having hair spray applied accompanied by the song "The Second Time Around" by Frank Sinatra before speaking the words "it's happening" whilst a full-length trailer included Jama teasing the return of former islanders with the tagline "Who will be back for amor[e]?". Following the announcement of the returning contestants, a further trailer featuring the cast posing on a red carpet began broadcasting across ITV channels. The series began on 15 January 2024, with a launch episode that aired simultaneously on ITV1 and ITV2 for the first time in the show's history.

== Islanders ==
The original returning Islanders for the All Stars series were announced on 8 January 2024, one week before the series launch.

Islander	Age	Hometown	Original series	Entered	Exited	Status	Ref.
Molly Smith	29	Manchester	Series 6	Day 1	Day 37	Winner	
Tom Clare	24	Barnsley	Series 9	Day 10	Day 37	Winner	
Callum Jones	27	Manchester	Series 6	Day 1	Day 37	Runner-up	
Jess Gale	24	Cambridge	Series 6	Day 22	Day 37	Runner-up	
Josh Ritchie	29	Bolton	Series 1	Day 4	Day 37	Third place	
Sophie Piper	25	Essex	Series 6	Day 10	Day 37	Third place	
Georgia Steel	25	York	Series 4	Day 1	Day 37	Fourth place	
Toby Aromolaran	24	Chafford Hundred	Series 7	Day 1	Day 37	Fourth place	
Anton Danyluk	29	Airdrie	Series 5	Day 1	Day 37	Fifth place	
Georgia Harrison	29	Essex	Series 3	Day 1	Day 37	Fifth place	
Adam Maxted	31	Belfast	Series 2	Day 26	Day 35	Dumped	
Arabella Chi	32	London	Series 5	Day 5	Day 35	Dumped	
Casey O'Gorman	27	Tring	Series 9	Day 16	Day 28	Dumped	
Eve Gale	24	Cambridge	Series 6	Day 22	Day 28	Dumped	
Chris Taylor	33	Leicester	Series 5	Day 1	Day 26	Dumped	
Joanna Chimonides	27	London	Series 5	Day 16	Day 25	Dumped	
Joe Garratt	27	London	Series 5	Day 22	Day 25	Dumped	
Kaz Kamwi	29	Witham	Series 7	Day 1	Day 23	Dumped	
Hannah Elizabeth	33	Liverpool	Series 1	Day 1	Day 16	Dumped	
Tyler Cruickshank	28	London	Series 7	Day 8	Day 16	Dumped	
Liberty Poole	24	Birmingham	Series 7	Day 1	Day 16	Dumped	
Mitchel Taylor	27	Sheffield	Series 10	Day 1	Day 16	Dumped	
Demi Jones	25	Portsmouth	Series 6	Day 1	Day 8	Dumped	
Luis Morrison	29	London	Series 1	Day 1	Day 8	Dumped	
Jake Cornish	26	Weston-super-Mare	Series 7	Day 1	Day 3	Walked	

=== Future appearances ===
In 2025, Casey O'Gorman returned for series 2 of Love Island: All Stars. He later competed on season two of Love Island Games alongside Toby Aromolaran.

In 2026, Toby Aromolaran and Anton Danyluk competed on the fourth series of Celebrity Ex on the Beach.

== Coupling and elimination history ==
The original couples were chosen by the voting public. On 11 January, four days before the launch, a vote opened on the app for viewers to decide which boy each girl should couple up with.

	Week 1		Week 2		Week 3		Week 4					Week 5	Final
	Day 1	Day 4	Day 8	Day 11	Day 16	Day 18	Day 23	Day 25		Day 26	Day 28	Day 35	Final
Molly	Callum	Callum		Tom	Vulnerable	Tom	Tom	Safe	Tom		Safe	Finalist	Winner (Day 37)
Tom	Not in Villa			Molly	Vulnerable	Molly	Molly	Safe	Molly		Safe	Finalist	Winner (Day 37)
Callum	Molly	Molly		Georgia S	Vulnerable	Arabella	Jess	Vulnerable	Jess		Safe	Finalist	Runner-up (Day 37)
Jess	Not in Villa						Callum	Vulnerable	Callum		Safe	Finalist	Runner-up (Day 37)
Josh	Not in Villa	Georgia H		Sophie	Vulnerable	Sophie	Sophie	Safe	Sophie		Vulnerable	Finalist	Third place (Day 37)
Sophie	Not in Villa			Josh	Vulnerable	Josh	Josh	Safe	Josh		Vulnerable	Finalist	Third place (Day 37)
Georgia S	Toby	Toby		Callum	Vulnerable	Toby	Toby	Safe	Toby		Vulnerable	Finalist	Fourth place (Day 37)
Toby	Georgia S	Georgia S		Arabella	Vulnerable	Georgia S	Georgia S	Safe	Georgia S		Vulnerable	Finalist	Fourth place (Day 37)
Anton	Hannah	Hannah		Georgia H	Vulnerable	Georgia H	Georgia H	Safe	Georgia H		Safe	Finalist	Fifth place (Day 37)
Georgia H	Luis	Josh		Anton	Vulnerable	Anton	Anton	Safe	Anton		Safe	Finalist	Fifth place (Day 37)
Adam	Not in Villa									Arabella	Immune	Eliminated	Dumped (Day 35)
Arabella	Not in Villa		Chris	Toby	Vulnerable	Callum	Joe	Vulnerable	Chris	Adam	Immune	Eliminated	Dumped (Day 35)
Casey	Not in Villa					Kaz	Eve	Vulnerable	Eve		Vulnerable	Anton & Georgia H to dump	Dumped (Day 28)
Eve	Not in Villa						Casey	Vulnerable	Casey		Vulnerable	Adam & Arabella to dump	Dumped (Day 28)
Chris	Demi	Demi	Arabella	Kaz	Vulnerable	Joanna	Joanna	Vulnerable	Arabella	Single	Dumped (Day 26)	Anton & Georgia H to dump	Dumped (Day 26)
Joanna	Not in Villa					Chris	Chris	Vulnerable	Dumped (Day 25)			Adam & Arabella to dump	Dumped (Day 25)
Joe	Not in Villa						Arabella	Vulnerable	Dumped (Day 25)			Adam & Arabella to dump	Dumped (Day 25)
Kaz	Mitchel	Luis	Tyler	Chris	Vulnerable	Casey	Single	Dumped (Day 23)				Anton & Georgia H to dump	Dumped (Day 23)
Hannah	Anton	Anton		Tyler	Vulnerable	Dumped (Day 16)						Adam & Arabella to dump	Dumped (Day 16)
Tyler	Not in Villa		Kaz	Hannah	Vulnerable	Dumped (Day 16)						Anton & Georgia H to dump	Dumped (Day 16)
Liberty	Jake	Mitchel		Mitchel	Eliminated	Dumped (Day 16)						Adam & Arabella to dump	Dumped (Day 16)
Mitchel	Kaz	Liberty		Liberty	Eliminated	Dumped (Day 16)						Anton & Georgia H to dump	Dumped (Day 16)
Demi	Chris	Chris	Single	Dumped (Day 8)								Adam & Arabella to dump	Dumped (Day 8)
Luis	Georgia H	Kaz	Single	Dumped (Day 8)								Molly & Tom to dump	Dumped (Day 8)
Jake	Liberty	Walked (Day 3)										Georgia S & Toby to dump	Walked (Day 3)
Notes	1	none	2	3	4	none	5	6	7	8	9	10	11
Walked	none	Jake	none										
Dumped	No; Dumping		Demi, Luis; Failed to couple up	No; Dumping	Liberty & Mitchel; Public's choice to dump	No; Dumping	Kaz; Failed to couple up	Joanna, Joe; Islanders' choice to dump	No; Dumping	Chris; Failed to couple up	Casey & Eve; Public's choice to dump	Adam & Arabella; 6 of 13 votes to dump	Anton & Georgia H 7% to win
Dumped	No; Dumping		Demi, Luis; Failed to couple up	No; Dumping	Hannah; Boys' choice to dump	No; Dumping	Kaz; Failed to couple up	Joanna, Joe; Islanders' choice to dump	No; Dumping	Chris; Failed to couple up	Casey & Eve; Public's choice to dump	Adam & Arabella; 6 of 13 votes to dump	Georgia S & Toby; 10% to win
Dumped	No; Dumping		Demi, Luis; Failed to couple up	No; Dumping	Hannah; Boys' choice to dump	No; Dumping	Kaz; Failed to couple up	Joanna, Joe; Islanders' choice to dump	No; Dumping	Chris; Failed to couple up	Casey & Eve; Public's choice to dump	Adam & Arabella; 6 of 13 votes to dump	Josh & Sophie; 15% to win
Dumped	No; Dumping		Demi, Luis; Failed to couple up	No; Dumping	Tyler; Girls' choice to dump	No; Dumping	Kaz; Failed to couple up	Joanna, Joe; Islanders' choice to dump	No; Dumping	Chris; Failed to couple up	Casey & Eve; Public's choice to dump	Adam & Arabella; 6 of 13 votes to dump	Callum & Jess; 33% to win
Dumped	No; Dumping		Demi, Luis; Failed to couple up	No; Dumping	Tyler; Girls' choice to dump	No; Dumping	Kaz; Failed to couple up	Joanna, Joe; Islanders' choice to dump	No; Dumping	Chris; Failed to couple up	Casey & Eve; Public's choice to dump	Adam & Arabella; 6 of 13 votes to dump	Molly & Tom; 35% to win

=== Notes ===
- ^Note 1: Ahead of the show's launch, voting opened for the public to decide the first couplings of the series. After the couples were revealed, Callum entered the villa and was given the option to couple up with a girl of his choice. However, before he made his decision, Molly entered. He ultimately chose to couple up with Molly.
- ^Note 2: On Day 8, Arabella was given the option to couple up with a boy of her choice. However, before she made her decision, Tyler entered. She ultimately chose to couple up with Chris. As Tyler entered single, he also had to choose a girl to steal. He chose Kaz. Newly single Demi and Luis were then dumped from the island.
- ^Note 3: Prior to the recoupling on Day 11, the public voted for who they wanted new islanders Sophie and Tom to couple up with. They paired Sophie with Josh, and Tom with Molly.
- ^Note 4: On Day 16, after receiving the fewest public votes for their favourite couple, Liberty and Mitchel were dumped from the island. It was then down the remaining islanders to pick another boy and girl to dump. The boys chose to dump Hannah, whilst the girls picked Tyler.
- ^Note 5: As new islanders, Eve, Jess and Joe were given first choice and decided to couple up with Callum, Casey and Arabella respectively. Meanwhile, Tom and Molly, Toby and Georgia S, Anton and Georgia H, Josh and Sophie, and Chris and Joanna all remained together, leaving Kaz single and therefore dumped from the island
- ^Note 6: On Day 25, following a villa vote for least compatible couple, Arabella and Joe, Casey and Eve, Callum and Jess, and Chris and Joanna were left vulnerable after receiving votes. It as then up to the safe islanders who dump one boy and one girl. They chose Joe and Joanna.
- ^Note 7: On Day 25, after Joanna and Joe were dumped, Arabella and Chris coupled up as the two remaining single islanders.
- ^Note 8: On Day 26, following Adam's arrival he was given the opportunity to steal a girl of his choice. He stole Arabella which ultimately left Chris single and dumped.
- ^Note 9: The public voted for their favorite couples. The couple who received the least votes would be immediately dumped from the island. As a new couple, Adam and Arabella were immune from the vote. Casey and Eve received the fewest votes and was dumped from the island.
- ^Note 10: On Day 35, previous dumped Islanders voted to dump one couple from the island. The one couple who received the most votes was dumped from the villa. Adam and Arabella received the most votes and was therefore dumped from the villa.
- ^Note 11: The public voted for which couple they think should win Love Island: All Stars. The couple with the most votes were declared the winners of Love Island: All Stars and received the grand prize money.

== Weekly summary ==
The main events in the Love Island villa are summarised in the table below.

Week 1	Entrances	On Day 1, Anton, Callum, Chris, Demi, Georgia H, Georgia S, Hannah, Jake, Kaz, Liberty, Luis, Mitchel, Molly and Toby entered the villa.; On Day 4, Josh entered the villa.; On Day 5, Arabella entered the villa.
Week 1	Coupling	On Day 1, following a public vote to decide the first couples of the series, Demi was paired with Chris, Georgia H coupled up with Luis, Georgia S was chosen to be with Toby, Hannah was given Anton, Liberty with Jake, and Kaz was picked to couple up with Mitchel. However, in a twist, Callum, who entered after the coupling, was told he had to steal one girl for himself. Molly then entered the villa and Callum was told he had the option to couple up with one of the girls already in an existing couple, or could choose to couple up with Molly instead. He chose Molly.; On Day 4, the islanders recoupled for the first time with the girls picking which boy they'd like to be with. As the newest islander, Josh chose first and decided to couple up with Georgia H. Hannah and Anton, Demi and Chris, Georgia S and Toby, and Molly and Callum remained together, meanwhile Kaz chose Luis, and Liberty coupled up with Mitchel.
Week 1	Challenges	On Day 2, the Islanders competed in a game of dares, in which they had to drink a glass of champagne and complete the dare written on the bottom of the glass.
Week 1	Dates	On Day 4, new islander Josh had to choose three girls to take on a date. He chose Georgia S, Hannah and Georgia H respectively.
Week 1	Exits	On Day 3, Jake decided to voluntarily leave the villa.
Week 2	Entrances	On Day 8, Tyler entered the villa.; On Day 10, Sophie and Tom entered the villa.
Week 2	Coupling	On Day 8, new girl Arabella was given the option to couple up with a boy of her choice. However, before she made her decision, Tyler entered. She ultimately chose to couple up with Chris. As new boy Tyler entered single, he also had to choose a girl to steal. He chose Kaz. Newly single Demi and Luis were then dumped from the island.; On Day 11, the islanders recoupled for the second time, in which the boys chose which girl they wanted to couple up with. However prior to the recoupling, the public voted for who they wanted new islanders Sophie and Tom to couple up with. They paired Sophie with Josh, and Tom with Molly. Tyler then coupled up with Hannah, Callum chose Georgia S, Chris went with Kaz, Toby coupled up with Arabella, and Anton chose Georgia H, whilst Mitchel and Liberty remained together.
Week 2	Challenges	On Day 9, the islanders took part in a game where they had to pop a balloon with their bodies using another islander and a sex position. They then had to answer a question based on their fellow islanders.; On Day 12, the islanders competed in a game of truth or dares, in which they had to transfer the a card using only their mouths, with the islander who dropped it having to complete a truth or dare decided by their fellow islanders.
Week 2	Dates	On Day 9, Chris and Arabella left the villa to go on their first date.; On Day 10, new Islanders Sophie and Tom were asked to choose three other islanders to take on dates with each of them preparing a starter, a main course and a dessert. Sophie picked Chris, Toby and Josh and whilst Tom chose Arabella, Molly and Georgia S.
Week 2	Exits	On Day 8, new islanders Arabella and Tyler chose to couple up Chris and Kaz, which ultimately left Demi and Luis single and dumped from the island.
Week 3	Entrances	On Day 16, Casey and Joanna entered the villa.
Week 3	Coupling	On Day 18, the islanders recoupled again, with the boys choosing which girl they wanted to couple up with. However, as new islanders, Casey and Joanna were given first choice and decided to couple up with Kaz and Chris respectively. Tom and Molly, and Anton and Georgia H remained together meanwhile Toby chose Georgia S and Josh chose Sophie, leaving Callum to couple up with Arabella.
Week 3	Challenges	On Day 15, the islanders competed in the "Snog, Marry, Pie" challenge where each islander had to snog, marry and pie an islander of the opposite gender.
Week 3	Dates	On Day 14, Hannah and Tyler left the villa to go on a date.
Week 3	Exits	On Day 16, after receiving the fewest public votes for their favourite couple, Liberty and Mitchel were dumped from the island. It was then down the remaining islanders to pick another boy and girl to dump. The boys chose to dump Hannah, whilst the girls picked Tyler.
Week 4	Entrances	On Day 22, Eve, Jess and Joe entered the villa.; On Day 26, Adam entered the villa.
Week 4	Coupling	On Day 23, the islanders recoupled for the fourth time, with the boys choosing which girl they wanted to couple up with. However, as new islanders, Eve, Jess and Joe were given first choice and decided to couple up with Callum, Casey and Arabella respectively. Meanwhile, Tom and Molly, Toby and Georgia S, Anton and Georgia H, Josh and Sophie, and Chris and Joanna all remained together, leaving Kaz single and therefore dumped from the island.; On Day 25, after Joanna and Joe were dumped, Chris and Arabella coupled up as the two remaining single islanders.; On Day 26, following Adam's arrival he was given the opportunity to steal a girl of his choice. He stole Arabella which ultimately left Chris single and dumped.
Week 4	Challenges	On Day 22, the Islanders competed in a game of dares, in which they had to pick a dare out of the box which they either had to complete, or choose another islander to complete it.; On Day 25, the islanders had to vote for another couple in a number of different categories. Unbeknownst to them, every couple who received a vote in the least compatible couple category was at risk of being dumped.
Week 4	Dates	On Day 26, Molly and Tom left the villa to go on a date.
Week 4	Exits	On Day 23, Kaz was dumped from the island after failing to couple up.; On Day 25, following a villa vote for least compatible couple, Arabella and Joe, Eve and Casey, Jess and Callum, and Joanna and Chris were left vulnerable after receiving votes. It as then up to the safe islanders who dump one boy and one girl. They chose Joe and Joanna.; On Day 26, following Adam's decision to steal Arabella, Chris was left single and dumped from the island.; On Day 28, after receiving the fewest public votes for their favourite couple, Casey and Eve were dumped from the island.
Week 5	Challenges	On Day 29, the boys and girls competed in a challenge where they had to raise their opposing team's heart rate. At the end of the game they found out who raised their heart rate the most.; On Day 30, the islanders were asked to predict where the public ranked them in a series of categories.
Week 5	Exits	On Day 35, following a vote by all of the ex-islanders, Adam and Arabella were dumped from the island.
Week 6	Exits	On Day 37, Georgia H and Anton finished in fifth place and Georgia S and Toby finished fourth, whilst Sophie and Josh finished third. Molly and Tom were announced as the winners, leaving Jess and Callum as runners-up.

== Ratings ==
Official 7-day consolidated ratings in the table below are taken from Thinkbox and include +1, but exclude viewership on devices.

The first episode was simulcast on ITV1 and ITV2; the rating listed is both added together (1.607m and 0.802m respectively)

	Viewers (millions)					
	Week 1	Week 2	Week 3	Week 4	Week 5	Week 6
Sunday		1.77	1.66	1.76	1.72	1.74
Monday	2.41	1.81	1.52	1.74	1.73	1.50
Tuesday	1.87	1.74	1.50	1.71	1.83	
Wednesday	1.77	1.59	1.52	1.78	1.72	
Thursday	1.70	1.64	1.56	1.83	1.87	
Friday	1.63	1.60	1.62	1.70	1.66	
Weekly average	1.88	1.69	1.56	1.75	1.76	1.62
Running average	1.88	1.79	1.71	1.72	1.73	1.71
Series average	1.71					
Unseen Bits		0.60	0.40	0.37	0.52	0.42
blue-coloured boxes denote shows aired on ITV1 and ITV2.
