= Belle Hassan =

English TV personality and influencer (born 1998)

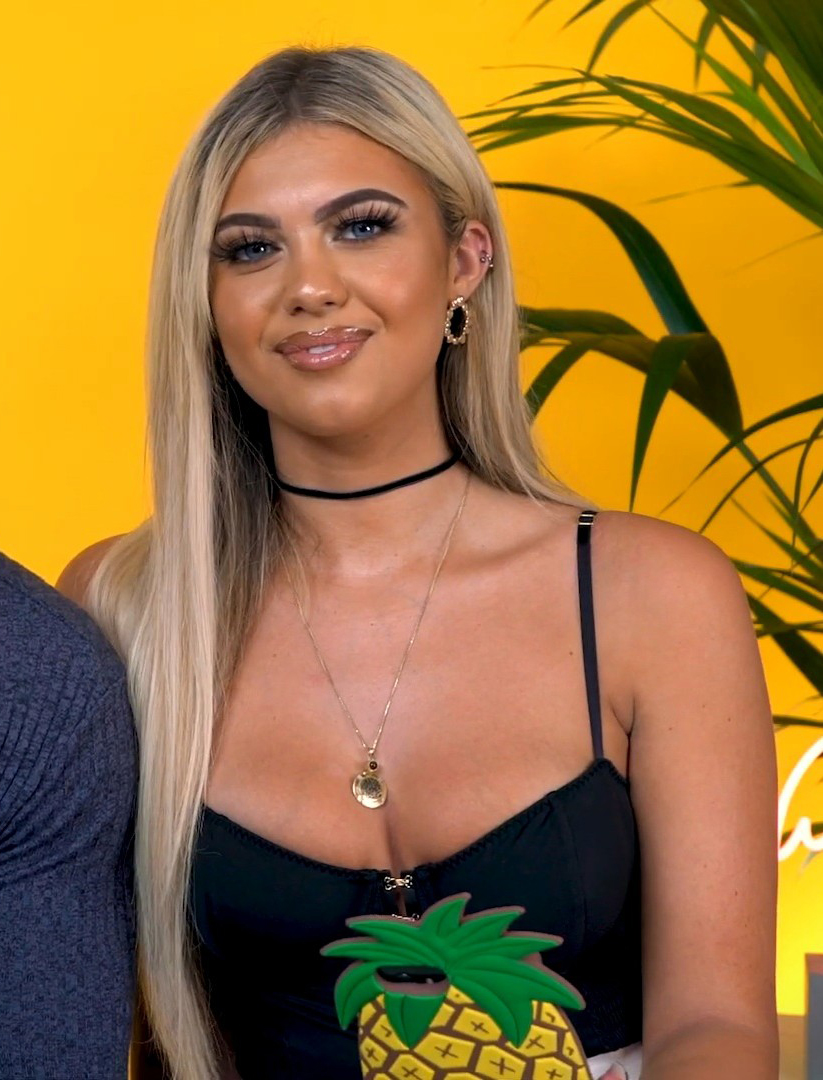
- Hassan in 2019
- Born: Belize Rita Hassan; 6 March 1998 (age 28); Bromley, London, England
- Occupations: Television personality; influencer
- Years active: 2019–present
- Television: Love Island; Love Island: All Stars

Belize Rita Hassan (born 6 March 1998) is an English television personality and social media influencer. Born in Bromley, London, she is the daughter of actor Tamer Hassan and spent time working as a professional make-up artist.

In June 2019, Hassan entered the fifth series of the ITV2 reality dating show Love Island as a "bombshell" contestant during the "Casa Amor" twist on Day 26, having been put forward for the show by a friend of her father. While on the show, she coupled up with fellow contestant Anton Danyluk and took him for a date in which the pair milked goats. The pair became the final couple to be dumped before the final on Day 56. Following their exit from the villa, they appeared on a Love Island special of the ITV2 game show Supermarket Sweep together and split in September 2019. Hassan later expressed regret at appearing on the show after being assaulted.

By February 2024, Hassan had moved to Edinburgh and had started dating rugby player Luke Crosbie; that November, she opened a salon in the area. She split up with him in early 2025, following which she took a break from social media and later alleged emotional abuse. In January 2026, Hassan returned to the Love Island franchise as a contestant on the third series of Love Island: All Stars, entering the villa on Day 1 and coupling up with Sean Stone. She also dated Jack Keating and Harrison Solomon, with whom she was dumped on Day 32. She has stated that she auditioned for EastEnders but was rejected for not being "rough" enough.

== Filmography ==
Year	Title	Role	Notes
2004	The Football Factory	Lydia	Film role
2005	The Business	Mandy	Film role
2011	The Last Seven	Isaac's Daughter	Film role
2017	Bitter Harvest	Katya	Film role
2019	Love Island	Herself	Contestant; series 5
2019	Supermarket Sweep	Herself	Contestant
2026	Love Island: All Stars	Herself	Contestant; series 3
