= Amber Gill =

English television personality and author (born 1997)

- Born: Amber Rose Gill; 4 August 1997 (age 28); Newcastle upon Tyne, England
- Occupations: Television personality; author
- Television: Love Island; Celebrity SAS: Who Dares Wins
- Writing career
- Genre: Romance
- Notable works: Until I Met You

Amber Rose Gill (born 4 August 1997) is an English television personality and author. In 2019, she won the fifth series of Love Island. She has since presented the ITV series The Full Treatment (2021), as well as competing on the Channel 4 survival series Celebrity SAS: Who Dares Wins (2022). Also in 2022, Gill released her debut romance novel, Until I Met You.

== Life and career ==
Amber Rose Gill was born on 4 August 1997 in Newcastle upon Tyne, England. Prior to her television career, she worked as a beauty therapist at a salon which she ran alongside her aunt. In June 2019, Gill became a contestant on the fifth series of Love Island. She entered the villa on Day 1 and throughout the series, coupled up with Callum Macleod, Anton Danyluk, Michael Griffiths and Ovie Soko. However, it was with rugby union player Greg O'Shea, who entered on Day 44, that she went on to win the series with on 29 July, beating the bookies' favourites Tommy Fury and Molly-Mae Hague in the final. Despite initially proving unpopular with the public, opinions on Gill later changed with viewers stating that they "judged [her] too quickly". Since her appearance on Love Island, she has gone on to make guest appearances on various different television series including Love Island: Aftersun, This Morning, Good Morning Britain, Loose Women, Strictly Come Dancing: It Takes Two, Lorraine and Ant & Dec's Saturday Night Takeaway. She has also released a clothing line with Misspap.

In April 2021, Gill appeared as a contestant on Celebrity Mastermind and answered questions on her specialist subject, the film How to Train Your Dragon. In June 2021, it was announced that Gill would present The Full Treatment on ITV2 alongside fellow Love Island winner Kem Cetinay. The series partnered with the mental health charity Campaign Against Living Miserably and featured Gill and Cetinay giving celebrities makeovers whilst discussing their mental health and wellbeing. Gill was asked to judge a writing competition held by Mills & Boon that was searching for stories from underrepresented ethnic backgrounds. She was later asked if she would like to write her own book, which Gill said was a surprising opportunity for her. She had felt underrepresented in media during her youth and wanted the book to be based around a Black love story. The book, Until I Met You, co-written with Nadine Gonzalez, a US romantic fiction author, is set in Tobago, where part of her heritage originates. It was released in July 2022 and she has said that she wants to release more books in the future. In 2022, she came out and said that she is open to dating women. She was dating Scottish international footballer Jen Beattie until their split in late 2023.

In 2022, Gill appeared on the Channel 4 survival series Celebrity SAS: Who Dares Wins. She quit the show after just two days.

In 2025, Gill took part in The Festive Pottery Throwdown 2025 alongside Colin Murray, Sarah Hadland and Tim Vine.

== Filmography ==
As herself
| Year | Title | Notes | Ref. |
|---|---|---|---|
| 2019 | Love Island | Contestant; winner | |
| 2019 | Love Island: Aftersun | Guest; 2 episodes | |
| 2019, 2022 | This Morning | Guest; 2 episodes | |
| 2019–2021 | Loose Women | Guest panellist; 4 episodes | |
| 2019 | Strictly Come Dancing: It Takes Two | Guest; 1 episode | |
| 2019 | Good Morning Britain | Guest; 1 episode | |
| 2020–2021 | Lorraine | Guest; 4 episodes | |
| 2020 | Ant & Dec's Saturday Night Takeaway | Guest; 2 episodes | |
| 2021 | The Full Treatment | Presenter | |
| 2021 | Celebrity Mastermind | Contestant | |
| 2022 | CelebAbility | Guest; 1 episode | |
| 2022 | Celebrity SAS: Who Dares Wins | Withdrew | |
| 2026 | Celebrity Catchphrase | Contestant; 1 episode | |

== Bibliography ==
- Until I Met You (2022)
- One Summer in Miami (2025)
