= Love Island series 1 =

Love Island series 1 may refer to:

- Love Island (2005 TV series) series 1
- Love Island (2015 TV series) series 1
