= Luke Crosbie =

Scotland international rugby union player

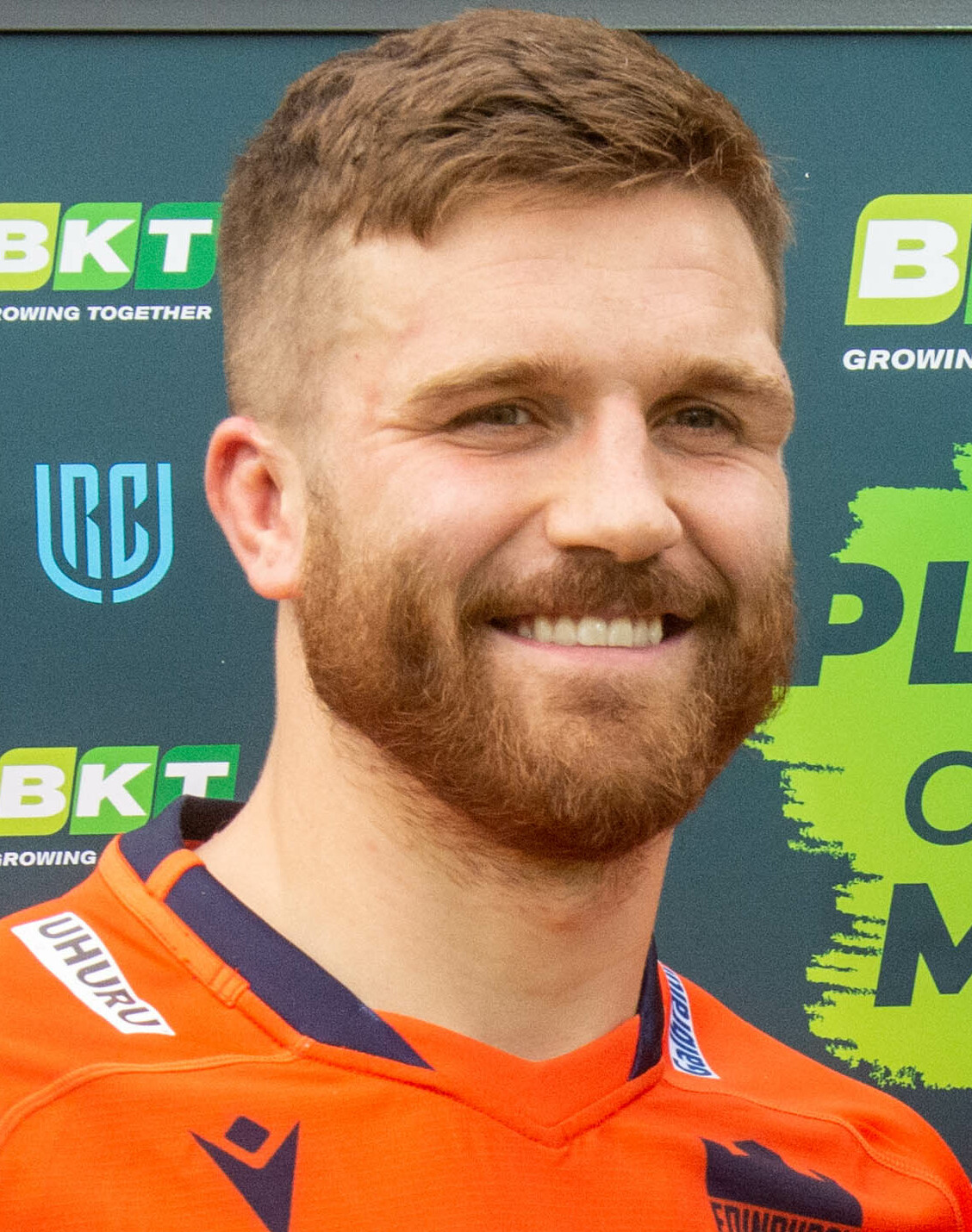
- Crosbie representing Edinburgh during the United Rugby Championship
- Full name: Luke William Crosbie
- Born: 22 April 1997 (age 29) Livingston, West Lothian, Scotland
- Height: 1.96 m (6 ft 5 in)
- Weight: 111 kg (245 lb; 17 st 7 lb)
- School: West Calder High School

Rugby union career
- Position: Flanker
- Current team: Edinburgh
Senior career
| Years | Team | Apps | (Points) |
| 2017– | Edinburgh | 99 | (45) |
- Correct as of 29 May 2024
International career
| Years | Team | Apps | (Points) |
| 2017 | Scotland U20 | 8 | (0) |
| 2022– | Scotland | 12 | (5) |
| 2022 | Scotland 'A' | 1 | (0) |
- Correct as of 25 November 2024

Luke William Crosbie (born 22 April 1997) is a Scottish professional rugby union player who plays as a flanker for United Rugby Championship club Edinburgh and the Scotland national team.

== Early life ==
Crosbie's early life was defined by his passion for sports, initially gravitating towards football before finding his stride in rugby with Livingston Rugby Club. Rising through the ranks in West Lothian, Crosbie's talent caught the eye of Currie in Edinburgh, where he seized an opportunity to further hone his skills. His dedication and talent earned him spots on the Scotland under-20 and under-18 teams, culminating in a standout performance at the World Rugby U20 Championship in Georgia. Despite a loss to New Zealand, Crosbie's team secured victories against formidable opponents like Ireland, Italy, and Australia, showcasing his potential on the international stage.

== Club career ==
He made his debut for Edinburgh off the bench against the Italian outfit Zebre coming on for Cornell du Preez in 64th minute.

In December 2017 after impressing with a physical and abrasive style of style of play allied with a rare turn of pace for a player of his stature, Crosbie signed his first professional deal with the club which will keep him at Edinburgh for at least the next two-and-a-half years.

== International career ==
He was called up to Scotland's squad for the 2019 Six Nations Championship. He was called up again to the 2020 Six Nations Championship squad.

He made his Scotland debut against Tonga on 30 October 2021. Scotland won the match 60–14.

He captained a Scotland 'A' side against Chile on 25 June 2022 in Santiago.

In 2023 Crosbie was selected in Scotland's 33 player squad for the 2023 Rugby World Cup in France.

== Personal life ==
In February 2024, Crosbie started dating Belle Hassan, a make-up artist, daughter of actor Tamer Hassan, and contestant on the fifth series of reality dating show Love Island. The couple split in early 2025, with Hassan implicitly alleging that Crosbie had emotionally abused her.

Awards and achievements
| Previous: Rory Darge | Sir Willie Purves Quaich; 2023 | Next: Harry Paterson |
