= Amy Hart (TV personality) =

English media personality (born 1992)

- Born: Amy Louise Hart; 17 July 1992 (age 34); Worthing, West Sussex, England
- Occupations: Television personality; presenter
- Years active: 2019–present
- Spouse: Sam Rason (m. 2024)
- Children: 2

Amy Louise Hart (born 17 July 1992) is an English media personality who appeared as a contestant on the fifth series of Love Island in 2019. Afterwards, she appeared on Loose Women, Love Island: Aftersun and co-presented Love Island: The Morning After between 2024 and 2026.

== Early and personal life ==
Hart was born on 17 July 1992 in Worthing, West Sussex. She attended Worthing High School. Her father is a funeral director.

In 2021, Hart began dating Sam Rason, the founder of a technology company called Viva City. The pair got engaged in 2023 after Rason proposed to her on a cruise ship, as well as having their first child, a son. Hart and Rason got married in 2024. In 2025, they announced that they were expecting a second child following two miscarriages. Hart gave birth to their second son in March 2026.

== Career ==
In 2011, Hart became a flight attendant at British Airways, going on to become a cabin crew manager. Hart also won Miss West Sussex at a local competition in 2013, and was titled Miss United Kingdom in the 2017 Miss Beautiful International Pageant. She had endorsed a marketing campaign for the brand Wombat Leather.

In 2019, Hart left her job and joined the fifth series of ITV2's Love Island as one of the original cast members. She was coupled with Curtis Pritchard; however, after a few weeks on the series, Pritchard decided he wanted to get to know another contestant romantically. Subsequently, Hart decided to leave the series to cure her mental health, as she said she had therapy "12 times" while she was there. Soon afterwards, she was booked as a guest panellist on ITV1's Loose Women.

In 2021, she appeared on Question Time to urge for police reform following the murder of Sarah Everard. The same year, she spoke to British parliament's Digital, Culture, Media and Sport Committee, detailing the abusive online messages she had received and highlighting the inaction of social media platforms in preventing such abuse.

In 2024, Hart started co-hosting Love Island: The Morning After visual podcast alongside Indiyah Polack, and became a rotating panellist on Love Island: Aftersun. In 2026, she announced her departure from both.

In 2025, she also started hosting her own podcast Mum's Club. Previously in 2024, she had hosted Hart to Heart podcast as an ambassador of P&O Cruises.

== Filmography ==
As herself
Year	Title	Notes
2019	Love Island	Contestant; series 5
2019–present	Loose Women	Guest panellist
2021	Question Time	Guest
2024–2025	Love Island: Aftersun	Panellist
2024–2026	Love Island: The Morning After	Co-presenter
