= Love Island: Aftersun =

British television aftershow

- Genre: Aftershow
- Presented by: Caroline Flack; Laura Whitmore; Maya Jama
- Starring: Indiyah Polack; Sam Thompson; Jordan Stephens; Amy Hart; Chris Taylor; Ash Holme; Joe Baggs; Toni Laites; Yasmin Pettet; Shakira Khan; Casey O'Gorman; Tyrique Hyde
- Music by: Andrei Basirov; Toby Jarvis
- Country of origin: United Kingdom
- Original language: English
- No. of series: 11
- No. of episodes: 86

Production
- Production location: Elstree Studios
- Running time: 60 minutes (incl. adverts)
- Production companies: ITV Studios; Lifted Entertainment; Motion Content Group

Original release
- Network: ITV2
- Release: 11 June 2017 – present

Related
- Love Island; Love Island: The Debrief

Love Island: Aftersun is a British television aftershow that discusses episodes and events regarding that of its main series, Love Island. It airs on Sundays, following episodes of the main series. Having aired on ITV2 since 2017 for the third series of Love Island, it is presented by the host of the main show. Initially Caroline Flack, Laura Whitmore briefly took over, before the position was assumed by current presenter Maya Jama in 2023. Love Island: Aftersun initially featured a panel of celebrities and former contestants that varied weekly, but since 2024, Jama has been joined by a fixed weekly panel.

== History ==
Celebrity Love Island aired on ITV1 from 2005 to 2006 and was accompanied by a companion show, Celebrity Love Island: Aftersun. The main series was later revived in 2015 as Love Island, instead featuring regular contestants. In 2017, ahead of the third series Love Island, it was announced that ITV2 had greenlit a companion show to air weekly, still under the name Aftersun. Despite the main series being set abroad, Aftersun is filmed at Elstree Studios in Elstree, Borehamwood. It airs on Sunday nights following Love Island, but does not air for its spin-off, Love Island: All Stars.

Since its premiere on 11 June 2017, Aftersun has been hosted by the presenter of the main show. This was initially Caroline Flack, who stepped down from hosting duties in 2019 due to her being charged with assaulting boyfriend Lewis Burton. She explained: "Love Island has been my world for the last five years, it's the best show on telly. In order to not detract attention from the upcoming series I feel the best thing I can do is to stand down". Laura Whitmore then hosted the main show as well as Aftersun from 2020 to 2022, before stepping down. She explained that she found elements of hosting the programmes difficult, particularly due to flying between South Africa and London regularly. Maya Jama has assumed the position of presenter since 2023.

== Hosts ==
Hosts	Series										
Hosts	1	2	3	4	5	6	7	8	9	10	11
Hosts	Companion series										
Hosts	3	4	5	6	7	8	9	10	11	12	13
Caroline Flack											
Laura Whitmore											
Maya Jama											

== Format and panel ==
Ahead of the premiere for Aftersun, ITV stated: "Aftersun promises to be packed to the rafters with the very latest gossip from the villa, exclusive interviews with the Islanders and a celebrity panel desperate to have their say on all things Love Island". The cast and crew are also joined by a live studio audience.

From its launch until 2024, the celebrity panel of Aftersun varied weekly but typically featured a recurring panellist. Comedian Darren Harriott appeared in a recurring capacity throughout 2022, In 2023, former contestant Indiyah Polack and television personality Sam Thompson appeared in each episode as special guests, amongst various celebrities. Then from 2024, the celebrity guest panel was scrapped and a fixed rotating panel was introduced instead. The panel consisted of Polack and Thompson, musician Jordan Stephens and former contestants Amy Hart and Chris Taylor. In 2025, Taylor and Stephens were replaced by social media personalities Ash Holme and Joe Baggs. In 2026, Thompson, Polack, Hart and Holme all announced their departures from the programme, with a new lineup set to be announced. Ahead of series 13 the new rotating panel was confirmed to consist of Baggs, series 12 finalists Toni Laites, Shakira Khan and Yasmin Pettet, series 10 contestant Tyrique Hyde as well as series 9 and two-time All Stars contestant Casey O’Gorman.

== Episodes ==
=== Series 5 ===
No. overall	No. in series	Title	Original release date	Guest(s)
33	1	"Episode 1"	4 July 2021	TBA
34	2	"Episode 2"	11 July 2021	Munya Chawawa, Clara Amfo, Sam Thompson
35	3	"Episode 3"	18 July 2021	AJ Odudu, HRVY, Mollie King
36	4	"Episode 4"	25 July 2021	Kem Cetinay, Jonas Blue, Ella Eyre
37	5	"Episode 5"	1 August 2021	Darren Harriott, Becky Hill, Amber Gill
38	6	"Episode 6"	8 August 2021	Roman Kemp, RAYE, Babatunde Aleshe
39	7	"Episode 7"	15 August 2021	Ella Henderson, Will Njobvu, Arielle Free
40	8	"Episode 8"	22 August 2021	TBA

=== Series 6 ===
No. overall	No. in series	Title	Original release date	Guest(s)
41	1	"Episode 1"	12 June 2022	TBA
42	2	"Episode 2"	19 June 2022	Rosie Jones, Sonny Jay, Nella Rose
43	3	"Episode 3"	26 June 2022	Darren Harriott
44	4	"Episode 4"	3 July 2022	TBA
45	5	"Episode 5"	10 July 2022	Darren Harriott, Mabel, Kae Kurd
46	6	"Episode 6"	17 July 2022	Darren Harriott
47	7	"Episode 7"	24 July 2022	Darren Harriott, Rosie Jones, Dean McCullough
48	8	"Episode 8"	31 July 2022	Joanne McNally, Scarlett Moffatt, Darren Harriott

=== Series 7 ===
No. overall	No. in series	Title	Original release date	Guest(s)
49	1	"Episode 1"	22 January 2023	TBA
50	2	"Episode 2"	29 January 2023	Babatunde Aléshé
51	3	"Episode 3"	5 February 2023	Leomie Anderson
52	4	"Episode 4"	12 February 2023	Mae Muller
53	5	"Episode 5"	19 February 2023	Jordan Stephens, Sam Thompson, Indiyah Polack
54	6	"Episode 6"	26 February 2023	TBA
55	7	"Episode 7"	5 March 2023	Elz the Witch, Davide Sanclimenti, Ekin-Su Cülcüloğlu
56	8	"Episode 8"	12 March 2023	TBA

=== Series 8 ===
No. overall	No. in series	Title	Original release date	Guest(s)
57	1	"Episode 1"	11 June 2023	Amelia Dimoldenberg
58	2	"Episode 2"	18 June 2023	Chunkz
59	3	"Episode 3"	25 June 2023	Stefflon Don
60	4	"Episode 4"	2 July 2023	Sam Thompson, Indiyah Polack, Sugababe Keisha
61	5	"Episode 5"	9 July 2023	Calum Scott, Sam Thompson, Indiyah Polack
62	6	"Episode 6"	16 July 2023	TBA
63	7	"Episode 7"	23 July 2023	Gareth Kelly
64	8	"Episode 8"	30 July 2023	TBA

=== Series 9 ===
No. overall	No. in series	Title	Original release date	Guest(s)
65	1	"Episode 1"	9 June 2024	Indiyah Polack, Amy Hart, Chris Taylor
66	2	"Episode 2"	16 June 2024	Will Young, Jessie Wynter
67	3	"Episode 3"	23 June 2024	Indiyah Polack, Amy Hart, Jordan Stephens
68	4	"Episode 4"	30 June 2024	Sam Thompson, Amy Hart, Hannah Elizabeth, Anton Danyluk
69	5	"Episode 5"	7 July 2024	Sam Thompson, Indiyah Polack, Jordan Stephens, Georgia Harrison, Arabella Chi
70	6	"Episode 6"	14 July 2024	Indiyah Polack, Sam Thompson, Chris Taylor
71	7	"Episode 7"	21 July 2024	Sam Thompson, Amy Hart, Chris Taylor
72	8	"Episode 8"	28 July 2024	Sam Thompson, Indiyah Polack, Chris Taylor, Amy Hart, Jordan Stephens

=== Series 10 ===
No. overall	No. in series	Title	Original release date	Guest(s)
73	1	"Episode 1"	15 June 2025	Indiyah Polack, Joe Baggs, Ash Holme
74	2	"Episode 2"	22 June 2025	Sam Thompson, Amy Hart, Ash Holme
75	3	"Episode 3"	29 June 2025	Sam Thompson, Indiyah Polack, Joe Baggs
76	4	"Episode 4"	6 July 2025	Amy Hart, Joe Baggs, Ash Holme
77	5	"Episode 5"	13 July 2025	Sam Thompson, Indiyah Polack, Amy Hart, Josh Ritchie, Sophie Piper
78	6	"Episode 6"	20 July 2025	Indiyah Polack, Sam Thompson, Ash Holme
79	7	"Episode 7"	27 July 2025	Indiyah Polack, Amy Hart, Joe Baggs, Toby Aromolaran, Kaz Kamwi
80	8	"Episode 8"	3 August 2025	Sam Thompson, Amy Hart, Indiyah Polack, Joe Baggs, Ash Holme

=== Series 11 ===
No. overall	No. in series	Title	Original release date	Guest(s)
81	1	"Episode 1"	7 June 2026	TBA
82	2	"Episode 2"	14 June 2026	TBA
83	3	"Episode 3"	21 June 2026	TBA
84	4	"Episode 4"	28 June 2026	TBA
85	5	"Episode 5"	5 July 2026	TBA
86	6	"Episode 6"	12 July 2026	TBA
87	7	"Episode 7"	19 July 2026	TBA
88	8	"Episode 8"	26 July 2026	TBA

== Ratings ==
Official ratings are taken from Thinkbox. Viewing figures are consolidated 7-day viewing figures with pre-broadcast viewing and viewing on tablets, PCs and smartphones included.

	Viewers (millions)							
	Week 1	Week 2	Week 3	Week 4	Week 5	Week 6	Week 7	Week 8
Series 11 (13)	0.29	0.25	0.32	—N/a	0.33	0.42	0.25	0.43
