= Chris Taylor (TV personality) =

English television personality (born 1990)

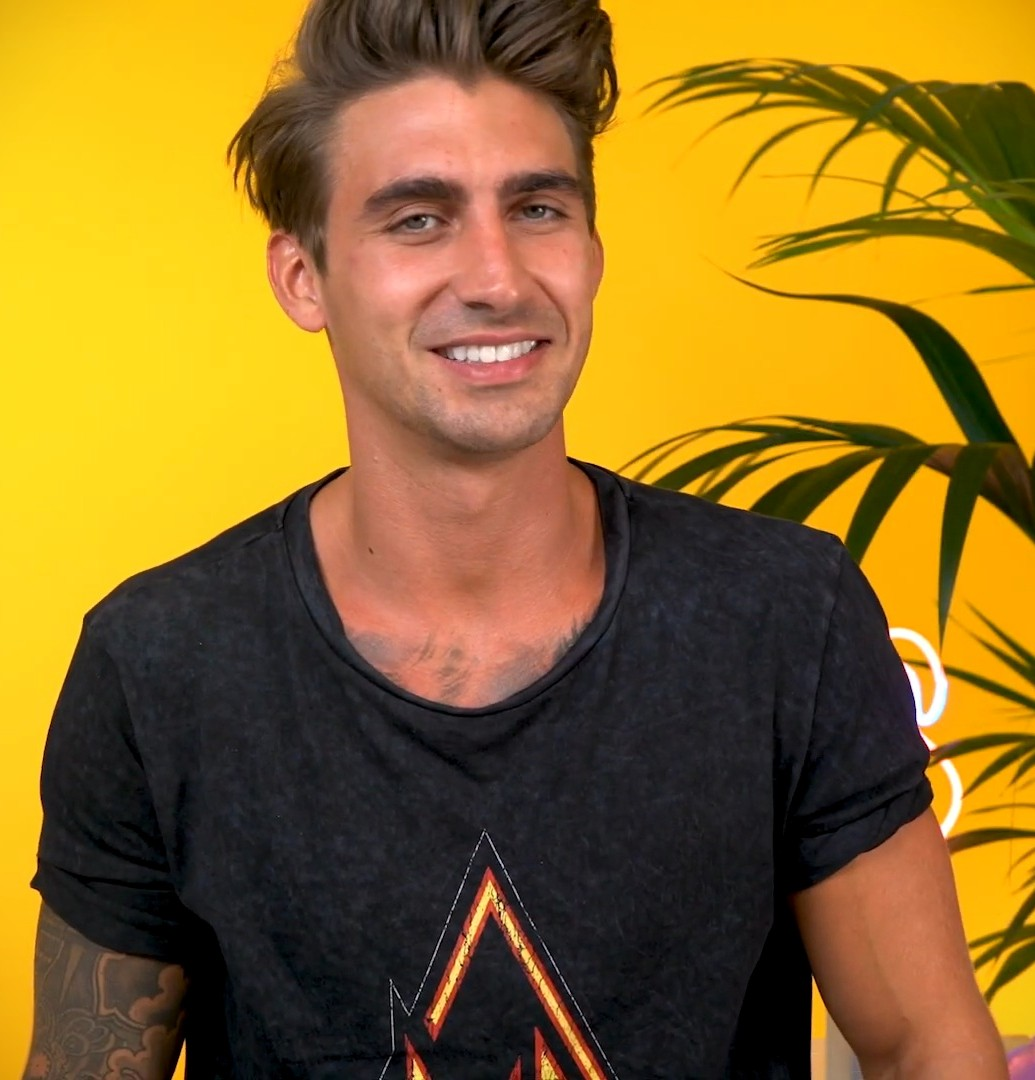
- Taylor in 2019
- Born: Christopher James Taylor; 31 July 1990 (age 36); Leicester, Leicestershire, England
- Occupation: Television personality
- Known for: Love Island; Barbie; Love Island: All-Stars; Celebs Go Dating; Dancing on Ice

Christopher James Taylor (born 31 July 1990) is an English television personality, known for his appearances as a contestant on the fifth series of Love Island (2019) and the spin-off Love Island: All-Stars (2024). He also had a cameo role in the Greta Gerwig film Barbie (2023). He appeared on reality dating show Celebs Go Dating (2024). He also competed on Dancing on Ice (2025).

== Life and career ==
Christopher James Taylor was born on 31 July 1990 in Leicester, Leicestershire. Prior to appearing on television, he worked as a business development manager. In 2019, Taylor entered the Love Island villa on Day 37 of the fifth series. He was dumped from the series two weeks later alongside Harley Brash. Later that year, Taylor and Brash appeared on a Love Island special of the ITV2 game show Supermarket Sweep, before announcing their split. Taylor went on to appear on a celebrity version of Dinner Date and was a guest on the game show Hey Tracey!. In 2021, he co-starred in the MTV series Living the Dream which focused on Taylor and his Love Island co-stars Michael Griffiths, Danny Williams and Jordan Hames moving in together.

In 2023, Taylor appeared as Ken Emcee in the Greta Gerwig film Barbie. Taylor secured the cameo role after meeting Margot Robbie at an after party in which Robbie, who is a fan of Love Island, struck up a conversation with him. Following this, Warner Bros invited him to audition for the part. In 2024, Taylor returned to Love Island five years after his original appearance to compete in the spin-off series Love Island: All-Stars. He entered the villa as an original islander on Day 1, and was dumped on Day 26. He then appeared on reality dating show Celebs Go Dating. Taylor was a co-host for the Love Island: The Morning After podcast and a panellist on Love Island: Aftersun from 2024 until 2025. In 2025, Taylor was announced as a contestant on Dancing on Ice.

== Filmography ==
Year	Title	Role	Notes	Ref.
2019	Love Island	Himself	Contestant; series 5	
2019	Supermarket Sweep	Himself	Contestant; 2 episodes	
2020	Celebrity Dinner Date	Himself	Participant	
2020	Hey Tracey!	Himself	Guest	
2021	MTV's Living the Dream	Himself	Cast member	
2023	Laura Whitmore's Breakfast Show	Himself	Contestant	
2023	Barbie	Ken Emcee	Cameo role	
2024	Love Island: All-Stars	Himself	Contestant	
2024	Celebs Go Dating	Himself	Contestant	
2024	Love Island: Aftersun	Himself	Rotating panellist	
2025	Dancing on Ice	Himself	Contestant; series 17	
