= Joe Baggs =

English social media influencer (born 1997)

- Occupations: Content creator and television personality
- Years active: 2020–present

Instagram information
- Page: joebxggs

TikTok information
- Page: Joseppi Baggzelini
- Followers: 2.2 million

YouTube information
- Channel: Not My Bagg
- Genre: Podcast
- Subscribers: 125,000
- Views: 24 million
- Last updated: 27 February 2026

Joe Baggs is an English TikToker and television personality. He first gained attention through his appearances with his family on the Channel 4 series Gogglebox and has since built a significant online presence, particularly on TikTok. He also hosts his own podcast, Not My Bagg.

== Biography ==
Baggs was born to Terry and Lisa Baggs and attended The Hertfordshire and Essex High School. He has a brother, George, and a half-brother. While at school, he created a music video for Lady Gaga's "Applause" that was nominated for the WJEC Moving Image Award. Baggs is gay and has credited Lady Gaga with giving him the confidence to come out. He started working as a recruiter for Spencer Ogden after leaving school and started uploading footage to TikTok after the COVID-19 pandemic hit. One video, in which Baggs rated each member of his family out of ten, went viral and brought them to the makers of Channel 4's Gogglebox, a programme in which families comment on television programmes. At the time, Baggs was living in Great Dunmow with George and his parents Terry and Lisa; all four began appearing on the show in September 2020. They took a break after one series due to the COVID-19 pandemic in the United Kingdom but returned for a further two; their May 2022 departure came from a desire to focus on other media and entertainment opportunities. Among the programmes they watched as part of the show was Naked Attraction, a dating show featuring large amounts of full-frontal nudity.

Baggs launched the drag queen persona Designa Baggs in late 2021 and shared a half hour BBC Radio 1 presenting slot with George on 25 December 2022 for the station's TikTok Takeover. By March 2023, he had started the podcast Not My Bagg with The Fellas Studios, which he has co-hosted with George and Lisa Baggs. Guests have included Kerry Katona, Melanie C, Coleen Nolan, The Only Way Is Essex's Ella Rae Wise and Freddie Bentley, and Love Island alumni Chloe Burrows, Millie Court, Uma Jammeh, Lauren Wood, and Harry Cooksley. A clip of Wood's episode was shown during the finale of the 2026 series of Love Island: All Stars shortly after it was broadcast. Joe became an ambassador for PrettyLittleThing in May 2024 and appeared on Lorraine in December 2024, the latter to talk about his friend GK Barry and the series of I'm a Celebrity...Get Me Out of Here! that she was participating in.

Baggs was one of several celebrities rumored to appear in the 2025 series of Celebrity Big Brother. By June 2025, he and had made appearances on Lorraine and I'm a Celebrity: Unpacked. That month, he and Ash Holme became regular panellists on Love Island: Aftersun, a companion programme to ITV2's Love Island. He signed to YMU management in August, by which time he was in a relationship with actor and content creator Kaine Ruddach. He then took at a shift at a London café with Olivia Attwood in September 2025 to promote NationFried, a vehicle for the Nationwide Building Society, and filmed vox-pop interactions with Joe Marler and members of the public in March 2026 to promote The Social Snacking Experiment, a vehicle for Pringles. By May 2026, Baggs had hosted a Britain's Got Talent spin-off show and competitions and vox-pop footage for ITV daytime shows.

== Filmography ==
=== Television ===
Year	Title	Role	Production	Notes	Ref.
2020–2022	Gogglebox	Self	Channel 4	Series 16, 18–19	
2024	BGT Reacts	Guest	ITVX		
2024	Lorraine	Guest	ITV		
2025–present	Love Island: Aftersun	Panellist	ITV2	Series 12–present	
2026	The Weakest Link	Contestant	BBC One	Series 5, Episode 7	
2026	The Inner Circle	Contestant	BBC One	Series 2, Episode 5	

=== Podcasts ===
Year	Title	Role	Notes	Ref.
2022–	Not My Bagg	Host/co-host		
2022–	Saving Grace	Guest	Seven episodes	
2023	The Useless Hotline	Guest		
