= Casey O'Gorman =

English television personality (born 1996)

- Born: Casey Thomas O'Gorman; 31 October 1996 (age 29); Tring, Hertfordshire, England
- Occupation: Television personality
- Years active: 2023–present
- Known for: Love Island; Love Island: All Stars; Made in Chelsea; Love Island Games

Casey Thomas O'Gorman (born 31 October 1996) is an English television personality. In 2023, he appeared as a contestant on the ninth series of the ITV2 dating show Love Island. He subsequently went on to appear on the first and second series of Love Island: All Stars in 2024 and 2025, respectively. He has also appeared on the E4 reality series Made in Chelsea.

== Life and career ==
Casey Thomas O'Gorman was born on 30 October 1996 in Tring, Hertfordshire. Prior to appearing on television, he worked as a recruitment consultant and attended Berkhamsted School, in the nearby town of Berkhamsted, Hertfordshire. In 2023, O'Gorman entered the Love Island villa to appear as a contestant on the ninth series. He entered as a "bombshell" on Day 17 of the series alongside Jordan Odofin. During his time on the show, he was coupled up with Lana Jenkins, Claudia Fogarty and Rosie Seabrook, the latter of whom he was dumped from the villa alongside on Day 51, a week before the show's final.

In 2024, O'Gorman returned to Love Island to appear as a contestant on the first series of Love Island: All Stars. He entered as a "bombshell" on Day 16 alongside Joanna Chimonides. During the series, he was coupled up with Kaz Kamwi and Eve Gale. He was dumped from the villa alongside the latter on Day 28, after the receiving the fewest votes from the public. He subsequently went on to join the cast of the E4 reality series Made in Chelsea. In 2025, it was announced that O'Gorman would return to Love Island for a third time, to appear as a contestant on the second series of Love Island: All Stars. He entered the villa as a "bombshell" on the second day of the series.

In 2026, O’Gorman joined Love Island: Aftersun as a permanent panellist.

== Filmography ==
As himself
| Year | Title | Notes | Ref. |
|---|---|---|---|
| 2023 | Love Island | Contestant; series 9 | |
| 2024 | Love Island: All Stars | Contestant; series 1 | |
| 2024 | Made in Chelsea | Cast member | |
| 2025 | Love Island: All Stars | Contestant; series 2 | |
| 2025 | Love Island Games | Contestant; season 2 | |
| 2026 | Love Island: Aftersun | Panellist | |
