= Greg O'Shea (rugby union) =

Irish former rugby union player (born 1995)

- Born: Gregory O'Shea; 23 March 1995 (age 31) Limerick, Ireland
- Height: 5 ft 7 in (170 cm)
- Weight: 145 lb (66 kg)
- School: Crescent College
- University: University of Limerick

Rugby union career
- Position(s): Wing (15s), Fly-half (7s)
Amateur team(s)
Years	Team	Apps	(Points)
- Young Munster
Senior career
Years	Team	Apps	(Points)
- Munster
International career
Years	Team	Apps	(Points)
2015	Ireland U20	1	(5)
- Correct as of 11 July 2019
National sevens team
Years	Team		Comps
2017–	Ireland 7s		

Gregory O'Shea (born 23 March 1995) is a former Irish rugby union player. He played for the Ireland national rugby sevens team, usually as a fly-half, retiring in 2021. In July 2019, O'Shea partnered with Amber Gill won the fifth series of Love Island.

== Early life and education ==
O'Shea is from Limerick, Ireland. His father Niall O'Shea and mother Carol O'Shea (née Ho) were both sprinters for Ireland. O'Shea's family is from Limerick, except his maternal grandfather who is from Hong Kong. O'Shea's maternal grandfather, Peter Ho, emigrated to Limerick from Hong Kong after World War II, opening up Limerick's second Chinese restaurant New Star.

O'Shea started playing rugby with local club Young Munster when he was seven years old later saying his love and pride for the club encouraged him to contintue to play rugby into his senior days "I love Young Munster, Shannon are a bunch of foids". O'Shea went to Scoil Íde in Corbally. He then attended Crescent College Comprehensive.

In 2017, O'Shea graduated from the University of Limerick School of Law with a law degree.

== Sports career ==
At Crescent College, O'Shea won a Munster Schools Rugby Senior Cup with the school in 2013 when they defeated Rockwell College in the final, having also won Junior Cups in 2010 and 2011. In addition to playing rugby, he was also a sprinter; when he was 16 he competed for Ireland at the 2011 European Youth Olympics 100m where he finished sixth. It was O'Shea's last competitive race, as he decided to leave athletics behind and focus on rugby.

O'Shea joined the Munster academy in 2013, playing mostly wing and fullback. O'Shea encountered a setback in 2015 when he fell off a bicycle and lacerated his achilles tendon, which took him a year until returning to full health. Despite the injury, Munster extended his academy place for an additional year. O'Shea was unable to earn a place on the Munster senior team, and he left the province.

O'Shea then began playing with the Ireland national sevens team. He played for Ireland at the 2017 Rugby Europe Sevens Grand Prix Series, where Ireland finished in second behind Russia. O'Shea struggled with injuries and missed the 2018 Hong Kong Sevens qualifying tournament, although he did make the 2018 Rugby World Cup Sevens squad.

O'Shea made the Ireland squad for the 2019 Hong Kong Sevens qualifier, helping the team win the tournament and qualify for the World Rugby Sevens Series. In June 2019, O'Shea played on the Paris 7s team. He was part of Ireland's Rugby Sevens squad which began training in August 2019 for the 2020 Summer Olympics in Tokyo.

In November 2019 he was named in Ireland's squad for the World Sevens.

== Television ==
In 2019, O'Shea won the fifth series of Love Island alongside Amber Gill, with 49% of the final public vote.

O'Shea joined Virgin Media Television in November 2022 as a presenter on The 6 O'Clock Show.

== Leadership ==
- 2019–2021: Rugby Players Ireland, Executive Board Member
