= Anton Danyluk =

Scottish television personality and fitness influencer (born 1994)

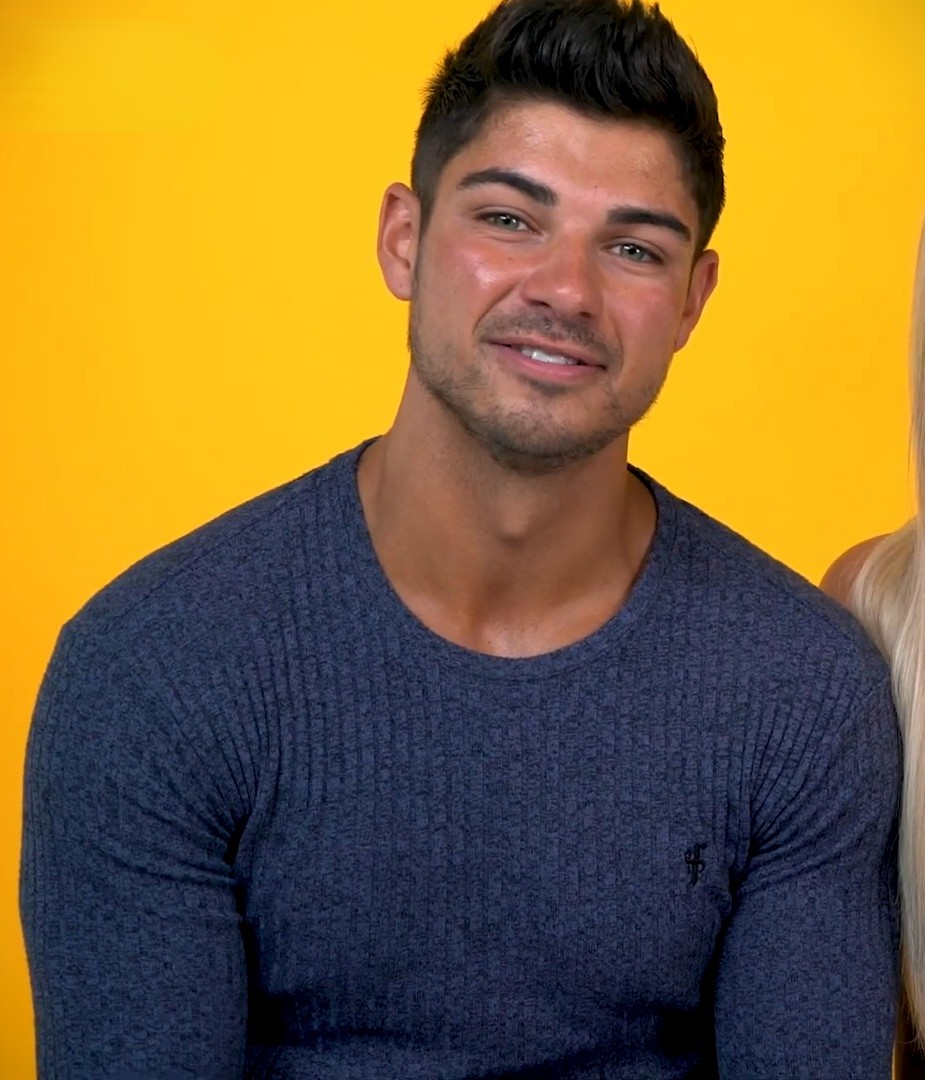
- Danyluk in 2019
- Born: 7 September 1994 (age 31); Blackridge, West Lothian, Scotland
- Occupations: Television personality; fitness influencer
- Television: Love Island; Anton Danyluk on Body Shame; Love Island: All Stars

Anton Danyluk (born 7 September 1994) is a Scottish television personality and fitness influencer, known for appearing as a contestant on the fifth series of Love Island in 2019. Following his exit from the show, he became a bodybuilder and fronted a BBC documentary Anton Danyluk on Body Shame in 2023. In 2024, he returned for the first series of the spin-off Love Island: All Stars.

== Life and career ==
Anton Danyluk was born on 7 September 1994 in Blackridge, West Lothian. At the time of appearing on television, he ran his own gym and worked as a fitness influencer. In June 2019, Danyluk became a contestant on the fifth series of Love Island. He entered the villa on Day 1 and was dumped on Day 56 alongside Belle Hassan, two days before the final. Following their exit from the villa, they entered a relationship and appeared on a Love Island special of the ITV2 game show Supermarket Sweep together. They split in September 2019.

Danyluk announced he was training to become a professional bodybuilder in 2021, and the following year he finished in third place in a bodybuilding contest. In 2023, Danyluk announced his retirement from bodybuilding after stating it was the "worst [he had] ever felt". He subsequently went on to front a documentary for the BBC titled Anton Danyluk on Bodyshame. In January 2024, Danyluk returned to Love Island villa to compete in the spin-off Love Island: All Stars. He entered the villa as an original Islander on Day 1, and finished in fifth place alongside Georgia Harrison during the final.

== Filmography ==
As himself
Year	Title	Notes	Ref.
2019	Love Island	Contestant; series 5	
2019	Love Island: Aftersun	Guest	
2019	Supermarket Sweep	Contestant	
2023	Anton Danyluk on Body Shame	Documentary	
2023	Good Morning Britain	Guest	
2024	Love Island: All Stars	Contestant; series 1	
