= Love Island (2015 TV series) series 1 =

2015 series of Love Island

Love Island
- Series 1
- Presented by: Caroline Flack
- No. of days: 41
- No. of contestants: 23
- Winners: Jess Hayes; Max Morley
- Runners-up: Jon Clark; Hannah Elizabeth
- No. of episodes: 29

Release
- Original network: ITV2
- Original release: 7 June – 15 July 2015

Series chronology
- Next → Series 2

The first series of Love Island began on 7 June 2015 with a live special of the show hosted by Caroline Flack on ITV2, and ended on 15 July 2015. It is the first from the revived series, but third overall. The series was narrated by Iain Stirling. The series aired every night of the week except Friday, however the Saturday episode was used as a weekly catch-up entitled Love Island: The Weekly Hot List rather than a nightly highlights episode. The average viewers for this series was 570,000.

On 15 July 2015, the series was won by Jess Hayes and Max Morley, with Hannah Elizabeth and Jon Clark as runners-up.

Clark later went onto appear as a cast member in The Only Way Is Essex, whilst both Morley and Josh Ritchie made appearances in Ex on the Beach. After finishing in fourth place, Cally Beech and Luis Morrison became the first couple to have a baby, with their first child in May 2017.

== Production ==
The first one-minute trailer for the series aired on 12 May 2015, confirming that the series would begin in June. Pictures of the villa were unveiled on 5 June 2015. The villa is located in Mallorca with 69 cameras watching the Islander's every move. It only includes double beds forcing them to share with each other, but has a special Hideaway bedroom for couples to spend the night away from the others similar to the Love Shack in the 2005 and 2006 version.

== Islanders ==
The Islanders for the first series were revealed on 2 June 2015, just days before the launch. However, throughout the series, more Islanders entered the villa to find love. Some Islanders were dumped from the island for either failing to couple up, some were voted off by their fellow Islanders, and others for receiving the fewest votes in public eliminations. The series was won by Jess and Max on 15 July 2015 after receiving 42% of the final vote, beating Hannah and Jon who received 36%, Lauren and Josh with 12%, and finally Cally and Luis who received 10%.

Islander	Age	Hometown	Entered	Exited	Status	Ref
Jess Hayes	22	Oxford	Day 1	Day 41	Winner	
Max Morley	22	Huddersfield	Day 14	Day 41	Winner	
Hannah Elizabeth	25	Liverpool	Day 1	Day 41	Runner-up	
Jon Clark	25	Essex	Day 1	Day 41	Runner-up	
Josh Ritchie	21	Bolton	Day 1	Day 41	Third place	
Lauren Richardson	26	East London	Day 1	Day 41	Third place	
Cally Jane Beech	23	Hull	Day 21	Day 41	Fourth place	
Luis Morrison	20	London	Day 1	Day 41	Fourth place	
Jordan Ring	31	Gloucester	Day 1	Day 35	Dumped	
Zoe Basia Brown	24	South London	Day 1	Day 35	Dumped	
Ben Porter	24	Wakefield	Day 32	Day 33	Dumped	
Poppy Farnan	22	Chester	Day 32	Day 33	Dumped	
Naomi Ball	23	East London	Day 7	Day 28	Dumped	
Travis Almond	22	Essex	Day 21	Day 28	Dumped	
Omar Sultani	22	Leamington Spa	Day 1	Day 21	Dumped	
Bethany Rogers	19	Leeds	Day 14	Day 21	Dumped	
Daisy Muller	24	Birmingham	Day 7	Day 19	Dumped	
Chris Williamson	27	Newcastle	Day 1	Day 19	Dumped	
Chris Baxter	20	London	Day 11	Day 14	Dumped	
Danielle Pyne	23	London	Day 1	Day 14	Dumped	
Rachel Christie	26	London	Day 1	Day 11	Dumped	
John Alberti	29	Manchester	Day 3	Day 6	Dumped	
Tony Alberti	29	Manchester	Day 3	Day 6	Dumped	

=== Future appearances ===
In 2024, Hannah Elizabeth, Luis Morrison, and Josh Ritchie returned for series one of Love Island: All Stars.

== Coupling and elimination history ==
The couples were chosen shortly after the Islanders entered the villa. After all of the boys entered, the girls were asked to choose a boy to pair up with. Jon was paired with Hannah, Chris was paired with Danielle, Omar and Rachel paired up, Josh and Lauren coupled up, whilst Jess paired herself with Jordan and Luis got with Zoe. They were competing in their pairs for £50,000. However, throughout the series the couples swapped and changed as the islanders re-coupled.

	Week 1			Week 2			Week 3			Week 4	Week 5		Final	
	Day 1	Day 2	Day 6	Day 8	Day 11	Day 14	Day 15	Day 19	Day 21	Day 28	Day 33	Day 35	Final	
Jess	Jordan	Josh	Josh	Single	Omar	Vulnerable	Single	Chris W to dump	Safe	Safe	Max	Finalist	Split the £50k	Winner (Day 41)
Max	Not in Villa						Single	Daisy to dump	Safe	Vulnerable	Jess	Finalist	Split the £50k	Winner (Day 41)
Hannah	Jon		Jon	Single	Jon	Chris B & Danielle to dump	Jon	Chris W to dump	Safe	Safe	Jon	Finalist	Runner-up (Day 41)	
Jon	Hannah		Hannah	Single	Hannah	Chris B & Danielle to dump	Hannah	Daisy to dump	Safe	Safe	Hannah	Finalist	Runner-up (Day 41)	
Josh	Lauren	Jess	Jess	Naomi		Vulnerable	Naomi	Daisy to dump	Safe	Safe	Lauren	Finalist	Third place (Day 41)	
Lauren	Josh	Jordan	Chris W	Single	Luis	Vulnerable	Single	Chris W to dump	Safe	Safe	Josh	Finalist	Third place (Day 41)	
Cally	Not in Villa									Safe	Luis	Finalist	Fourth place (Day 41)	
Luis	Zoe		Danielle	Single	Lauren	Vulnerable	Single	Daisy to dump	Safe	Safe	Cally	Finalist	Fourth place (Day 41)	
Jordan	Jess	Lauren	Zoe	Daisy		Vulnerable	Single	Daisy to dump	Safe	Safe	Zoe	Eliminated	Dumped (Day 35)	
Zoe	Luis		Jordan	Single	Chris W	Vulnerable	Single	Chris W to dump	Safe	Vulnerable	Jordan	Eliminated	Dumped (Day 35)	
Ben	Not in Villa										Single	Dumped (Day 33)		
Poppy	Not in Villa										Single	Dumped (Day 33)		
Naomi	Not in Villa			Josh		Vulnerable	Josh	Chris W to dump	Safe	Eliminated	Dumped (Day 28)			
Travis	Not in Villa									Eliminated	Dumped (Day 28)			
Beth	Not in Villa						Single	Chris W to dump	Eliminated	Dumped (Day 21)				
Omar	Rachel		Rachel	Single	Jess	Vulnerable	Single	Daisy to dump	Eliminated	Dumped (Day 21)				
Chris W	Danielle		Lauren	Single	Zoe	Vulnerable	Single	Zoe to dump	Dumped (Day 19)					
Daisy	Not in Villa			Jordan		Vulnerable	Single	Jordan to dump	Dumped (Day 19)					
Chris B	Not in Villa				Danielle	Vulnerable	Dumped (Day 14)							
Danielle	Chris W		Luis	Single	Chris B	Vulnerable	Dumped (Day 14)							
Rachel	Omar		Omar	Single		Dumped (Day 11)								
John	Not in Villa		Single	Dumped (Day 6)										
Tony	Not in Villa		Single	Dumped (Day 6)										
Notes	none	1	none	2	none	3	4	5	6	7	none	8	9	
Dumped	No; Dumping		John, Tony; Failed to couple up	No; Dumping	Rachel; Failed to couple up	Chris B & Danielle; Hannah & Jon's choice to dump	No; Dumping	Chris W 6 of 7 votes to dump	Beth, Omar; Public's choice to dump	Naomi, Travis; Public's choice to dump	Ben, Poppy; Failed to couple up	Jordan & Zoe; Public's choice to dump	Cally & Luis; 10% to win	
Dumped	No; Dumping		John, Tony; Failed to couple up	No; Dumping	Rachel; Failed to couple up	Chris B & Danielle; Hannah & Jon's choice to dump	No; Dumping	Chris W 6 of 7 votes to dump	Beth, Omar; Public's choice to dump	Naomi, Travis; Public's choice to dump	Ben, Poppy; Failed to couple up	Jordan & Zoe; Public's choice to dump	Josh & Lauren; 12% to win	
Dumped	No; Dumping		John, Tony; Failed to couple up	No; Dumping	Rachel; Failed to couple up	Chris B & Danielle; Hannah & Jon's choice to dump	No; Dumping	Daisy; 6 of 7 votes to dump	Beth, Omar; Public's choice to dump	Naomi, Travis; Public's choice to dump	Ben, Poppy; Failed to couple up	Jordan & Zoe; Public's choice to dump	Hannah & Jon; 36% to win	
Dumped	No; Dumping		John, Tony; Failed to couple up	No; Dumping	Rachel; Failed to couple up	Chris B & Danielle; Hannah & Jon's choice to dump	No; Dumping	Daisy; 6 of 7 votes to dump	Beth, Omar; Public's choice to dump	Naomi, Travis; Public's choice to dump	Ben, Poppy; Failed to couple up	Jordan & Zoe; Public's choice to dump	Jess & Max; 42% to win	

=== Notes ===
- ^Note 1: On Day 2, after Jess and Jordan won a challenge they were given the opportunity to swap two couples. Jess decided to couple up with Josh, leaving Jordan in a new couple with Lauren.
- ^Note 2: On Day 8, the islanders were told that they were all single, but new girls Daisy and Naomi would get the chance to couple up with a boy of their choice after going on three dates. Daisy chose Jordan and Naomi chose Josh.
- ^Note 3: On Day 14, the public voted for which couple they wanted to become the power couple. Hannah and Jon became the power couple and had to choose one couple to be dumped from the island. They chose to dump Chris B and Danielle.
- ^Note 4: On Day 15, the islanders were told that once again they were all single, unless they wanted to announce that they are officially boyfriend and girlfriend. The only couples to do this were Hannah and Jon, and Naomi and Josh.
- ^Note 5: On Day 19, the girls were asked to vote for the boy islander they wanted to dump. They chose Chris W to dump from the island. The boys were then asked to vote for the girl islander they wanted to dump. They chose Daisy to dump from the island.
- ^Note 6: On Day 21, the public voted for which girl islander and which boy islander they did not want to stay. The public chose Beth and Omar and they were dumped from the island.
- ^Note 7: On Day 28, the public voted for their favourite islanders. The boy and girl islanders with the fewest votes would be vulnerable and at risk of being dumped. As the boy and girl islander with the fewest votes, Naomi and Travis were dumped from the island.
- ^Note 8: On Day 35, the public voted for which couple they wanted to be dumped. The couple who received the most votes, Jordan and Zoe, was dumped from the island.
- ^Note 9: The public voted for which couple they think should win Love Island. The couple with the most votes were declared the winner of Love Island and received the grand prize money.

== Guests ==
During the series a number of guests entered the villa.

- On 25 June 2015 it was announced that Calum Best would be returning to the series. On Day 24, he briefly entered to take the boys on a night out in Magaluf. This was Calum's third appearance on the show having previously appeared on the original series in 2005. He later returned for 2006 series where he was voted the winner alongside Bianca Gascoigne. Paul Danan also appeared on the series as part of the panel on the penultimate episode.
- On 12 July 2015, it was announced that Mark Wright would be briefly entering the villa. He entered on Day 38 to become the DJ for Lauren's birthday party, he departed shortly after the party.

== Weekly summary ==
The main events in the Love Island villa are summarised in the table below.

Week 1	Entrances	On Day 1, Chris W, Danielle, Hannah, Jess, Jon, Jordan, Josh, Lauren, Luis, Omar, Rachel and Zoe entered the villa.; On Day 3, John and Tony entered the villa.; On Day 7, Daisy and Naomi entered the villa.
Week 1	Coupling	On Day 1, the Islanders coupled up for the first time. After all of the boys entered, the girls were asked to choose a boy to pair up with. Jon was paired with Hannah, Chris was paired with Danielle, Omar and Rachel paired up, Josh and Lauren coupled up, whilst Jess paired herself with Jordan and Luis got with Zoe.; On Day 2, after Jess and Jordan won a challenge they were given the opportunity to swap two couples. Jess decided to couple up with Josh, leaving Jordan in a new couple with Lauren.; On Day 6, the Islanders were told that they had to re-couple. Hannah and Jon, Omar and Rachel, and Jess and Josh remained with each other, whilst Jordan coupled with Zoe, Luis paired with Danielle, and Chris W chose Lauren. As John and Tony remained single, they were dumped from the island.
Week 1	Challenges	On Day 2, Rachel and Omar hosted "Getting Intimate", where members of each couple stood at opposite ends of the pool and were asked questions about their partner. Every correct answer moved them a step towards their partner. The winning couple was the pair that met in the middle first. This was Jordan and Jess.; On Day 3, the girls took part in "The Perfect Man" where they had to choose the best abs, guns, legs, face and heart from cutouts of the boys.; On Day 5, the boys competed in the "Mega LADS Championship" where they took part in a number of LAD related tasks. The girls then decided that Luis was the overall winner.
Week 1	Dates	On Day 3, Hannah and Jon left the villa to go on a date.; On Day 3, shortly after entering, John and Tony each chose a girl they'd like to date in the Hideaway. John chose Danielle, and Tony chose Jess. At the end of the date, each girl was given the option to stay the night. They both declined and returned to the villa.; On Day 4, Zoe and Rachel both dated their partners; Luis and Omar, and then dated John and Tony. After the dates the girls were given the option of who the spend the night with. They chose John and Tony respectively.
Week 1	Exits	On Day 6, John and Tony were eliminated after failing to couple up.
Week 2	Entrances	On Day 11, Chris B entered the villa.; On Day 14, Bethany and Max entered the villa.
Week 2	Coupling	On Day 8, the Islanders were told that they were all single, but new girls Daisy and Naomi would get the chance to couple up with a boy of their choice after going on three dates. Daisy chose Jordan, and Naomi chose Josh respectively.; On Day 11, the Islanders were asked to couple up again, apart from Naomi and Josh, and Daisy and Jordan who were already coupled up. Newest Islander Chris B got first pick and chose Danielle, whilst Omar chose Jess, Luis paired with Lauren, and Chris W coupled with Zoe. Hannah and Jon also remained a couple. After failing to couple up with anybody, Rachel was dumped from the island.
Week 2	Challenges	On Day 11, to decide the re-coupling order, the boys took part in "Heart Makers" where they had to solve an equation to unlock a chest, then complete a puzzle that was inside.; On Day 13, the couples had to transfer cocktails from one large fishbowl to another small fishbowl using only their mouths. Jon and Hannah won the challenge and were rewarded with messaged from home.
Week 2	Dates	On Day 8, as the new girls, Daisy and Naomi dated three boys each before being asked to couple with one of them. Daisy dated Chris W, Jordan and Omar before coupling with Jordan, whilst Naomi dated Chris W, Josh and Luis before coupling with Josh.; On Day 11, Jon and Hannah spent the night in the Hideaway.; On Day 12, Chris W and Zoe left the villa to go on a date.
Week 2	Exits	On Day 11, Rachel was eliminated after failing to couple up.; On Day 14, Chris B and Danielle were eliminated after being chosen by Power Couple Hannah and Jon.
Week 3	Entrances	On Day 21, Cally and Travis entered the villa, as chosen by the Islanders on Day 20.
Week 3	Coupling	On Day 15, the Islanders were told that once again they were all single, unless they wanted to announce that they are officially boyfriend and girlfriend. The only couples to do this were Hannah and Jon, and Naomi and Josh.
Week 3	Challenges	On Day 15, the Islanders took part in a game of "Truth or Dare".; On Day 16, the Islanders took part in "Kissing Contest" where the girls had to individually kiss each of the boys and then rate them. Jordan won the contest.; On Day 17, Jon and Hannah competed against Naomi and Josh in the "Compatibility Test".; On Day 19, the Islanders took part in "Love is Blind" where the boys had to instruct the girls round an obstacle course whilst they were blindfolded. Luis and Lauren won this challenge and were rewarded with a phone call from home.; On Day 20, the girls took part in a video call with three potential new boys and had to choose one of them to become and new Islander. They chose Travis. Following this, the boys took part in a video call with another three potential new girls, then chose Cally to enter the villa. These then entered on Day 21.
Week 3	Dates	On Day 16, after winning the kissing challenge, Jordan was rewarded with a date with the girl of his choice. He chose with Zoe.; On Day 16, as new Islanders, Bethany and Max were given the opportunity to go on a date with a fellow Islander. Bethany chose to date Luis, whilst Max chose Zoe.; On Day 18, Hannah and Jon left the villa to go on a shopping date.
Week 3	Exits	On Day 19, the girls were asked to vote for the male Islander they wanted to eliminate, and the boys were asked to vote for the female Islander they wanted to dump. They chose Chris W and Daisy.; On Day 21, Bethany and Omar were dumped from the island after receiving the fewest votes to stay in the villa from the public.
Week 4	Challenges	On Day 24, Lauren hosted "In Hot Water" as the Islanders had to work out who said what about each other.; On Day 24, Calum Best entered the villa to take the boys on a night out in Magaluf whilst the girls had strippers to entertain them back at the villa.; On Day 25, the girls were shown footage from the boys night out in Magaluf and had to guess what happened next, whilst the boys had to do the same with videos from the girl's night in with the strippers.; On Day 26, the Islanders took part in "Take a Selfie" where they had to guess what the public thought of them by working out who is the most and least from each category. To lock in their answer they had to take a selfie with that chosen filter.; On Day 27, the couples took part in a general knowledge quiz called "Pied Off" where each incorrect answer meant a pie to the face.
Week 4	Dates	On Day 22, as new Islanders, Cally and Travis were given the opportunity to go on a date with a fellow Islander. Cally chose to date Luis, whilst Travis chose Lauren.; On Day 26, Lauren and Josh, and Jess and Travis left the villa to go on a double date.
Week 4	Exits	On Day 28, Naomi and Travis were eliminated after receiving the fewest public votes.
Week 5	Entrances	On Day 32, Ben and Poppy entered the villa after being chosen by the Islanders. They were instantly given a secret mission to couple up with somebody at the next re-coupling or they would be eliminated.
Week 5	Coupling	On Day 33, the Islanders coupled up for the final time. Hannah and Jon remained together, whilst Jordan coupled up with Zoe for the second time. Max paired with Jess, Luis went with Cally and Josh with Lauren. After failing to couple up, Ben and Poppy failed their secret mission and were dumped from the island.
Week 5	Challenges	On Day 29, Cally and Luis hosted a White Party in the villa.; On Day 30, Max and Josh cooked dinner for five potential new Islanders, including Jordan's ex-girlfriend.; On Day 32, the Islanders were asked to collect a number of items to build a "relation ship". The winners were the couple who made their boat float.; On Day 33, the couples took part in "Bucking Hell" and had to compete to stay on a Mechanical bull whilst hitting a number of targets.; On Day 34, the boys got a lie detector test with the girls asking the questions.
Week 5	Dates	On Day 31, Lauren and Jess speed dated five potential new Islanders, including John and Tony who returned hoping for another chance. Omar also returned to be the waiter for the dates.; On Day 32, as new Islanders, Ben and Poppy were given the opportunity to go on a date with a fellow Islander. Ben chose to date Lauren, whilst Poppy chose Josh.; On Day 33, Jess and Max left the villa to go on a horse riding date.
Week 5	Punishments	On Day 35, Jon was given a warning for pulling the sheets off Luis and Cally's bed exposing them.
Week 5	Exits	On Day 33, Ben and Poppy were eliminated after failing their secret mission.; On Day 35, Jordan and Zoe were eliminated after receiving the most public votes to dump.
Week 6	Entrances	On Day 37, the Islander's friends and family briefly entered the villa.
Week 6	Challenges	On Day 36, the remaining couples were told they'd go head-to-head against each other in a number of challenges to win a special prize.; On Day 37, the Islanders were told there are 4 keys and 4 hearts hidden in the villa for them to find. The girl's heart must match the boy's lock, and it would then decide the teams for the next challenge where they had to mark body parts with paint based on the Latin word for them.; On Day 38, the couples had their parenting skills tested by looking after dolls. Any couple who failed the challenge would not be invited to Lauren's birthday party. Mark Wright entered the host the party.; On Day 40, the girls left the villa to go wedding dress shopping, whilst the boys stayed in to write vows. The couples then hosted their own ceremony.; On Day 41, winners Max and Jess were asked if they were in their couple for "Love" or "Money". If both chose Love they would share the £50,000 prize, however if both chose Money they would receive nothing. If one chose Love and the other chose Money then Love would receive nothing but Money would receive the whole £50,000. The pair both chose Love and ultimately earned £25,000 each.
Week 6	Exits	On Day 41, Luis and Cally left the villa in fourth place, whilst Lauren and Josh finished third. Max and Jess were then voted the winners, leaving Hannah and Jon as runners-up.

== Ratings ==
Official ratings are taken from BARB but do not include +1. Because the Saturday episodes are weekly catch-up episodes rather than nightly highlights, these are not included in the overall averages.

	Viewers (millions)					
	Week 1	Week 2	Week 3	Week 4	Week 5	Week 6
Sunday	0.64	0.43	0.54	0.55	0.60	0.67
Monday	0.49	0.46	0.55	0.62	0.75	0.61
Tuesday	0.38	0.47	0.56	0.70	0.59	0.60
Wednesday	0.39	0.49	0.54	0.62	0.61	0.91
Thursday	0.41	0.40	0.56	0.56	0.74	
Weekly average	0.46	0.45	0.55	0.61	0.66	0.70
Running average	0.46	0.46	0.49	0.52	0.55	0.57
Series average	0.57					
