= Love Island (2015 TV series) series 5 =

2019 series of Love Island

Love Island
- Series 5
- Presented by: Caroline Flack
- No. of days: 58
- No. of contestants: 36
- Winners: Amber Gill; Greg O'Shea
- Runners-up: Tommy Fury; Molly-Mae Hague
- Companion show: Love Island: Aftersun
- No. of episodes: 49

Release
- Original network: ITV2
- Original release: 3 June – 29 July 2019

Series chronology
- ← Previous; Series 4 Next → Series 6

The fifth series of Love Island began airing on 3 June 2019 on ITV2, and concluded on 29 July 2019. The show was presented by Caroline Flack and narrated by Iain Stirling. It is the fifth from the current revived series, but seventh overall. Singer Craig David made a cameo appearance at a Ministry of Sound pool party as a DJ performing his new single "When You Know What Love Is".

On 29 July 2019, the winners of the series were by Amber Gill and Greg O'Shea, having received 48.82% of the final vote. Molly-Mae Hague and Tommy Fury finished as runners-up.

Series five is the highest-rated series ever; with a series average of 5.61 million viewers, up 1.65 million on the previous 2018 series.

== Production ==
During the final of the previous series on 30 July 2018, it was confirmed that Love Island would return for a fifth season due to air the following year. The first 10-second trailer for the series was released on 20 May 2019, featuring "#DayDotIsComing" and confirming the new start date. This was the first series not to feature "Love Island: The Weekly Hotlist," which previously aired on a Saturday featuring highlights from that week. Instead, it was replaced by "Love Island: Unseen Bits."

On 22 May 2019, ITV released a statement that outlined the duty of care processes ahead of the series following the suicides of former contestants Sophie Gradon and Mike Thalassitis. It highlights the care offered before, during, and after the series for each of the contestants. The programme announced that they will offer counseling to all contestants in hopes of preventing further incidents that concern the mental welfare of contestants.

In December, it was announced that Caroline Flack would not return due to her assault charge. This series marked the last since its revival in 2015 to be hosted by Flack.

== Islanders ==
The islanders for the fifth series were released on 27 May 2019, just one week before the launch. However, throughout the series, more islanders entered the villa to find love. On 11 June 2019, it was announced that Sherif Lanre had been removed from the villa, due to "breaking villa rules." Lanre later said, "I feel that the people in charge of the show have an unconscious bias around the regulations for boys and girls, and maybe different races." On 9 July 2019, it was announced that Amy Hart had decided to leave the villa for "personal reasons." After being dumped by her "half boyfriend," Curtis, she said she knew she could not find love again while in the villa. The series was won by Amber Gill and Greg O'Shea, who received 48.82% of the final vote.

Islander	Age	Hometown	Entered	Exited	Status	Ref
Amber Gill	21	Newcastle	Day 1	Day 58	Winner	
Greg O'Shea	24	Limerick	Day 44	Day 58	Winner	
Molly-Mae Hague	20	Hitchin	Day 4	Day 58	Runner-up	
Tommy Fury	20	Manchester	Day 1	Day 58	Runner-up	
India Reynolds	28	Reading	Day 44	Day 58	Third place	
Ovie Soko	28	London	Day 26	Day 58	Third place	
Curtis Pritchard	23	Whitchurch	Day 1	Day 58	Fourth place	
Maura Higgins	28	Ballymahon	Day 10	Day 58	Fourth place	
Anton Danyluk	24	Airdrie	Day 1	Day 56	Dumped	
Belle Hassan	21	Bromley	Day 26	Day 56	Dumped	
Anna Vakili	28	London	Day 1	Day 52	Dumped	
Jordan Mainoo-Hames	24	Manchester	Day 14	Day 52	Dumped	
Chris Taylor	28	Leicester	Day 37	Day 52	Dumped	
Harley Brash	20	Newcastle	Day 44	Day 52	Dumped	
Francesca Allen	23	Loughton	Day 37	Day 49	Dumped	
Michael Griffiths	27	Liverpool	Day 1	Day 49	Dumped	
Joanna Chimonides	22	London	Day 26	Day 42	Dumped	
Marvin Brooks	29	Poole	Day 26	Day 39	Dumped	
Amy Hart	26	Worthing	Day 1	Day 37	Walked	
George Rains	22	Saffron Walden	Day 26	Day 36	Dumped	
Lucie Donlan	21	Newquay	Day 1	Day 36	Dumped	
Danny Williams	21	Hull	Day 7	Day 36	Dumped	
Jourdan Riane Hammond	24	Essex	Day 26	Day 36	Dumped	
Dan Rose	21	Nuneaton	Day 26	Day 30	Dumped	
Dennon Lewis	22	Watford	Day 26	Day 30	Dumped	
Lavena Back	23	Croydon	Day 26	Day 30	Dumped	
Maria Wild	22	Cheltenham	Day 26	Day 30	Dumped	
Nabila Badda	29	London	Day 26	Day 30	Dumped	
Stevie Bradley	21	Isle of Man	Day 26	Day 30	Dumped	
Arabella Chi	28	London	Day 18	Day 25	Dumped	
Tom Walker	29	Leeds	Day 14	Day 25	Dumped	
Yewande Biala	23	Enfield	Day 1	Day 22	Dumped	
Joe Garratt	22	London	Day 1	Day 16	Dumped	
Elma Pazar	26	Essex	Day 10	Day 16	Dumped	
Sherif Lanre	20	London	Day 1	Day 9	Removed	
Callum Macleod	28	Bridgend	Day 1	Day 5	Dumped	

=== Future appearances ===
In 2023, Curtis Pritchard appeared on season one of Love Island Games.

In 2024, Arabella Chi, Joanna Chimonides, Anton Danyluk, Joe Garratt and Chris Taylor returned for series one of Love Island: All Stars.

In 2025, Elma Pazar, Pritchard, and India Reynolds appeared on series two of Love Island: All Stars.

In 2026, Belle Hassan and Pritchard returned for series three of Love Island: All Stars. Pritchard and Danyluk competed on the fourth series of Celebrity Ex on the Beach.

Maura Higgins has appeared as a guest host on Love Island Games, season five of Love Island USA, and as the host of Love Island USA: Aftersun since season six.

== Coupling and elimination history ==
The first couples were chosen shortly after the contestants entered the villa. After all the girls entered, the boys were asked to choose a girl to pair up with. Anton was paired with Amy, Callum with Amber, Joe and Lucie paired up, Michael and Yewande coupled up, and Sherif paired up with Anna. Curtis and Tommy then entered the villa and were told they would be stealing a girl each the following day.

	Week 1			Week 2	Week 3	Week 4		Week 5	Week 6			Week 7		Week 8			Final	
	Day 1	Day 2	Day 5	Day 14	Day 16	Day 22	Day 25	Day 30	Day 36	Day 39	Day 42	Day 46	Day 49	Day 52	Day 54	Day 56	Final	
Greg	Not in Villa											Amber	Anna & Jordan to save	Safe	Curtis & Maura to dump	Finalist	Split the £50k	Winner (Day 58)
Amber	Callum		Anton	Michael	Joe & Lucie; Anton & Elma; Least compatible	Michael	Safe	Single	Immune	Ovie	Anna & Jordan to save	Greg	Anna & Jordan to save	Safe	Curtis & Maura to dump	Finalist	Winner (Day 58)	
Molly-Mae	Not in Villa		Tommy	Tommy	Joe & Lucie; Anton & Elma; Least compatible	Tommy	Safe	Tommy	Amy & Curtis to save	Tommy	Anna & Jordan to save	Tommy	Anna & Jordan to save	Safe	Anton & Belle to dump	Finalist	Runner-up (Day 58)	
Tommy	Not in Villa	Lucie	Molly-Mae	Molly-Mae	Joe & Lucie; Anton & Elma; Least compatible	Molly-Mae	Safe	Molly-Mae	Amy & Curtis to save	Molly-Mae	Anna & Jordan to save	Molly-Mae	Anna & Jordan to save	Safe	Anton & Belle to dump	Finalist	Runner-up (Day 58)	
India	Not in Villa											Ovie	Harley & Chris to save	Safe	Curtis & Maura to dump	Finalist	Third place (Day 58)	
Ovie	Not in Villa							Anna	Amy & Curtis to save	Amber	Anna & Jordan to save	India	Harley & Chris to save	Safe	Curtis & Maura to dump	Finalist	Third place (Day 58)	
Curtis	Not in Villa	Amy	Amy	Amy	Joe & Lucie; Anton & Elma; Least compatible	Amy	Vulnerable	Amy	Vulnerable	Francesca	Joanna & Michael to save	Maura	Anna & Jordan to save	Safe	India & Ovie to dump	Finalist	Fourth place (Day 58)	
Maura	Not in Villa			Single	Immune	Tom	Vulnerable	Marvin	George & Lucie to save	Chris	Anna & Jordan to save	Curtis	Anna & Jordan to save	Safe	India & Ovie to dump	Finalist	Fourth place (Day 58)	
Anton	Amy	Single	Amber	Elma	Molly-Mae & Tommy; Danny & Yewande; Least compatible	Lucie	Safe	Belle	Amy & Curtis to save	Belle	Joanna & Michael to save	Belle	Anna & Jordan to save	Safe	India & Ovie to dump	Eliminated	Dumped (Day 56)	
Belle	Not in Villa							Anton	Amy & Curtis to save	Anton	Joanna & Michael to save	Anton	Anna & Jordan to save	Safe	India & Ovie to dump	Eliminated	Dumped (Day 56)	
Anna	Sherif		Sherif	Single	Immune	Jordan	Vulnerable	Ovie	Amy & Curtis to save	Jordan	Vulnerable	Jordan	Vulnerable	Eliminated	Dumped (Day 52)			
Jordan	Not in Villa				Immune	Anna	Vulnerable	Single	Immune	Anna	Vulnerable	Anna	Vulnerable	Eliminated	Dumped (Day 52)			
Chris	Not in Villa									Maura	Anna & Jordan to save	Harley	Vulnerable	Eliminated	Dumped (Day 52)			
Harley	Not in Villa											Chris	Vulnerable	Eliminated	Dumped (Day 52)			
Francesca	Not in Villa									Curtis	Joanna & Michael to save	Michael	Vulnerable	Dumped (Day 49)				
Michael	Yewande		Yewande	Amber	Joe & Lucie; Anton & Elma; Least compatible	Amber	Safe	Joanna	Amy & Curtis to save	Joanna	Vulnerable	Francesca	Vulnerable	Dumped (Day 49)				
Joanna	Not in Villa							Michael	Amy & Curtis to save	Michael	Vulnerable	Dumped (Day 42)						
Marvin	Not in Villa							Maura	George & Lucie to save	Single	Dumped (Day 39)							
Amy	Anton	Curtis	Curtis	Curtis	Joe & Lucie; Anton & Elma; Least compatible	Curtis	Vulnerable	Curtis	Vulnerable	Walked (Day 37)								
George	Not in Villa							Lucie	Vulnerable	Dumped (Day 36)								
Lucie	Joe	Tommy	Joe	Joe	Anton & Elma; Danny & Yewande; Least compatible	Anton	Safe	George	Vulnerable	Dumped (Day 36)								
Danny	Not in Villa			Yewande	Molly-Mae & Tommy; Anton & Elma; Least compatible	Arabella	Vulnerable	Jourdan	Eliminated	Dumped (Day 36)								
Jourdan	Not in Villa							Danny	Eliminated	Dumped (Day 36)								
Dan	Not in Villa							Single	Dumped (Day 30)									
Dennon	Not in Villa							Single	Dumped (Day 30)									
Lavena	Not in Villa							Single	Dumped (Day 30)									
Maria	Not in Villa							Single	Dumped (Day 30)									
Nabila	Not in Villa							Single	Dumped (Day 30)									
Stevie	Not in Villa							Single	Dumped (Day 30)									
Arabella	Not in Villa					Danny	Vulnerable	Dumped (Day 25)										
Tom	Not in Villa				Immune	Maura	Vulnerable	Dumped (Day 25)										
Yewande	Michael		Michael	Danny	Molly-Mae & Tommy; Anton & Elma; Least compatible	Single	Dumped (Day 22)											
Elma	Not in Villa			Anton	Molly-Mae & Tommy; Danny & Yewande; Least compatible	Dumped (Day 16)												
Joe	Lucie	Single	Lucie	Lucie	Anton & Elma; Danny & Yewande; Least compatible	Dumped (Day 16)												
Sherif	Anna		Anna	Removed (Day 9)														
Callum	Amber		Single	Dumped (Day 5)														
Notes	none	1	none		2	none	3	4	5	none	6	none	7	8	9	10	11	
Removed	none			Sherif	none													
Walked	none									Amy	none							
Dumped	No; Dumping		Callum; Failed to couple up	No; Dumping	Elma, Joe; Public's choice to dump	Yewande; Failed to couple up	Tom; Girls' choice to dump	Dan, Dennon, Lavena, Maria, Nabila, Stevie; Failed to couple up	Danny & Jourdan; Public's choice to dump	Marvin; Failed to couple up	Joanna; Safe islanders' choice to dump	No; Dumping	Francesca & Michael; Safe islanders' choice to dump	Anna & Jordan, Chris & Harley; Public's choice to dump	No; Dumping	Anton & Belle; Public's choice to dump	Curtis & Maura; 7.40% to win	
Dumped	No; Dumping		Callum; Failed to couple up	No; Dumping	Elma, Joe; Public's choice to dump	Yewande; Failed to couple up	Tom; Girls' choice to dump	Dan, Dennon, Lavena, Maria, Nabila, Stevie; Failed to couple up	Danny & Jourdan; Public's choice to dump	Marvin; Failed to couple up	Joanna; Safe islanders' choice to dump	No; Dumping	Francesca & Michael; Safe islanders' choice to dump	Anna & Jordan, Chris & Harley; Public's choice to dump	No; Dumping	Anton & Belle; Public's choice to dump	India & Ovie; 18.21% to win	
Dumped	No; Dumping		Callum; Failed to couple up	No; Dumping	Elma, Joe; Public's choice to dump	Yewande; Failed to couple up	Arabella; Boys' choice to dump	Dan, Dennon, Lavena, Maria, Nabila, Stevie; Failed to couple up	George & Lucie; 1 of 5 votes to save	Marvin; Failed to couple up	Joanna; Safe islanders' choice to dump	No; Dumping	Francesca & Michael; Safe islanders' choice to dump	Anna & Jordan, Chris & Harley; Public's choice to dump	No; Dumping	Anton & Belle; Public's choice to dump	Molly-Mae & Tommy; 25.56% to win	
Dumped	No; Dumping		Callum; Failed to couple up	No; Dumping	Elma, Joe; Public's choice to dump	Yewande; Failed to couple up	Arabella; Boys' choice to dump	Dan, Dennon, Lavena, Maria, Nabila, Stevie; Failed to couple up	George & Lucie; 1 of 5 votes to save	Marvin; Failed to couple up	Joanna; Safe islanders' choice to dump	No; Dumping	Francesca & Michael; Safe islanders' choice to dump	Anna & Jordan, Chris & Harley; Public's choice to dump	No; Dumping	Anton & Belle; Public's choice to dump	Amber & Greg; 48.82% to win	

=== Notes ===
- ^Note 1: Curtis and Tommy arrived after the coupling on Day 1, but were told they would be able to steal girls for themselves on Day 2. Curtis chose Amy, and Tommy picked Lucie.
- ^Note 2: On Day 14, the islanders voted anonymously for the two least compatible couples. As single and new islanders, Anna, Jordan, Maura and Tom were immune from this vote. Anton and Elma, and Joe and Lucie received the most votes, they went head-to-head with each other in a public vote with only one islander from each couple being able to stay. On Day 16, it was revealed that Joe and Elma received the fewest votes and were therefore dumped from the island.
- ^Note 3: On Day 25, after receiving the fewest public votes, Amy and Curtis, Anna and Jordan, Arabella and Danny, and Maura and Tom were at risk of being dumped. The remaining islanders had to choose one boy and one girl to dump from the island. The boys chose Arabella and the girls chose Tom.
- ^Note 4: As the final part for the Casa Amor twist in weeks 4 and 5, Casa Amor and the villa held two separate re-coupling ceremonies for the original islanders to choose whether to return to their previous partner or pick any new partner. Any of the new islanders that remained single by the end of either ceremony was dumped from the villa. However, if one of the original islanders remained single at the end of both ceremonies, they would still remain in the villa, but as a single islander. Dan, Dennon, Lavena, Maria, Nabila and Stevie remained single at the end the night, and were all dumped from the villa.
- ^Note 5: On Day 36, after the public voted for their favourite couple, it was announced that Amy and Curtis, Danny and Jourdan, and Lucie and George were the three couples with the fewest votes. Danny and Jourdan were then immediately dumped having been told they had received the fewest. It was then up to the safe islanders to pick a second couple to dump. They chose Lucie and George.
- ^Note 6: On Day 42, after receiving the fewest votes to be saved from their fellow islanders, Joanna and Michael were told that only one of them could stay in the villa.
- ^Note 7: On Day 49, the public voted for their favourite islanders. The couple who received the fewest votes was therefore in danger of being dumped. It was then up to the safe islanders to decide which of them should leave.
- ^Note 8: The public voted for their favorite couples. The top couples who received the most votes were granted safety. The couple who received the fewest votes were dumped from the villa.
- ^Note 9: On Day 54, the couple voted for the couple they wanted to dump from the island. The couples who received the most votes were vulnerable of being dumped from the island. The couple who did receive any votes were safe and became finalist.
- ^Note 10: The public voted for their favorite couples. The couple with the fewest votes was dumped from the island.
- ^Note 11: The public voted for which couple they think should win Love Island. The couple with the most votes were declared the winners of Love Island and received the grand prize money.

== Weekly summary ==
The main events in the Love Island villa are summarised in the table below.

Week 1	Entrances	On Day 1, Amber, Amy, Anna, Anton, Callum, Curtis, Joe, Lucie, Michael, Sherif, Tommy and Yewande entered the villa.; On Day 4, Molly-Mae entered the villa.
Week 1	Coupling	On Day 1, the Islanders coupled up for the first time. After all of the girls entered, the boys were asked to choose a girl to pair up with. Amy coupled up with Anton, Amber paired up with Callum, Lucie with Joe, Anna with Sherif and Yewande with Michael.; On Day 2, Curtis and Tommy were each allowed to steal a girl from a couple. Curtis chose Amy, whereas Tommy chose Lucie, leaving Anton and Joe single.; On Day 5, the islanders re-coupled. This time it was the girls who had to pick a boy to pair up with. Anna and Sherif, Michael and Yewande and Amy and Curtis remained together, while Amber chose Anton, Lucie left Tommy to get back with Joe, and new girl Molly-Mae went for Tommy. As Callum remained single, he was dumped from the island.
Week 1	Challenges	On Day 2, the girls and the boys competed against each other in "Sliding Into The DMs", in which they had to guess which islander a fact was about, To make their guess they had to kiss that islander. The girls won the challenge.; On Day 5, the boys competed in "The Good, the Bad and the Sexy" where they had to complete several cowboy themed challenges before rescuing the girl in their couple. The girls chose Michael as the winner.
Week 1	Dates	On Day 2, as the newest couples, Curtis and Amy, and Tommy and Lucie went on a double date.; On Day 4, Tommy was chosen by the public to go on a date with new girl Molly-Mae. Following their date Molly-Mae had to choose another boy to have a second date with. She chose Curtis.
Week 1	Exits	On Day 5, Callum was dumped from the island after failing to couple up.
Week 2	Entrances	On Day 7, Danny entered the villa.; On Day 10, Elma and Maura entered the villa.
Week 2	Challenges	On Day 6, in "Tower of Truths" each islander had to pull out blocks from a tower, each containing questions They then had to ask that question to the islander in their couple.; On Day 12, the girls competed in the Bridezillas challenge where they had to drag their man up the aisle then compete in a food fight. Anna won the challenge.
Week 2	Dates	On Day 7, new islander Danny was asked to choose two girls to take on dates. He picked Amber and Yewande.; On Day 9, Lucie and Joe left the villa to go paddle boarding.; On Day 10, new Islanders Elma and Maura were asked to choose three other Islanders to take on dates. Elma chose Danny, Anton, and Tommy. Maura picked Tommy, Danny, and Michael.
Week 2	Exits	On Day 9, Sherif was removed from the villa for "breaking villa rules".
Week 3	Entrances	On Day 14, Jordan and Tom entered the villa.; On Day 18, Arabella entered the villa.
Week 3	Coupling	On Day 14, the islanders re-coupled with the boys choosing the girls. Curtis and Amy, Joe and Lucie, and Tommy and Molly-Mae all remained together. Whilst Michael chose to couple up with Amber, Danny chose Yewande, and Anton picked Elma, leaving both Anna and Maura single.
Week 3	Challenges	On Day 15, the Islanders competed in the 'Suck and Blow' challenge where they had to pass cards with dares on them to each other from mouth to mouth. The islander who dropped the card had to complete the dare.; On Day 16, the Islanders competed in the 'Eyes on the Fries' challenge where in their couples they had to transfer a fast food meal from one table to another only using their mouths. Michael and Amber judged Maura and Tom to be the winners.; On Day 19, the girls competed in the 'Snogathon'. The girls kissed each boy in turn. The boys were blindfolded and gave them a score out of ten. Anna won the challenge.; On Day 21, the girls competed in the 'Gym Bunnies' challenge where they had to race to complete an array of gym themed challenges in the quickest time. Maura won the challenge and won a night in the hideaway.
Week 3	Dates	On Day 14, single girls Anna and Maura left the villa to go on dates with new boys Jordan and Tom.; On Day 17, Amber and Michael left the villa to go on their first date.; On Day 18, new girl Arabella took Danny and Anton on dates.; On Day 19, Amy and Curtis went on a date.
Week 3	Exits	On Day 14, the islanders voted anonymously for the two least compatible couples. As Anton and Elma, and Joe and Lucie received the most votes, they went head-to-head with each other in a public vote with only one islander from each couple being able to stay. On Day 16, it was revealed that Joe and Elma received the fewest votes and were therefore dumped from the island.
Week 4	Entrances	On Day 26, Lavena, Nabila, Joanna, Belle, Jourdan, and Maria entered the main villa whilst Stevie, Marvin, Dennon, George, Dan and Ovie joined the original girls in Casa Amor.
Week 4	Coupling	On Day 22, there was a recoupling with the boys choosing the girls. Curtis and Amy, Michael and Amber and Tommy and Molly-Mae remained together. Single boys Tom, Jordan, and Anton chose Maura, Anna, and Lucie respectively. Danny chose to couple up with Arabella which left Yewande single and dumped from the island.
Week 4	Challenges	On Day 23, the Islanders competed in the "Sex Pop Quiz". The Islanders were split into two teams and the team that popped balloons between couples quickest got to answer the sex-based questions. The quiz was won by the green team consisting of Michael, Amber, Curtis, Amy, Danny, and Arabella.; On Day 24, the Islanders competed in the "Online Buzz" challenge where they had to guess the blanks in tweets by the public. The winner was a tie between Michael and Amber, and Anna and Jordan.
Week 4	Dates	On Day 25, Tommy and Molly-Mae left the villa to go horse riding.
Week 4	Exits	On Day 22, Yewande was dumped from the villa for failing to couple up.; On Day 25, after receiving the fewest public votes, Amy and Curtis, Anna and Jordan, Arabella and Danny, and Maura and Tom were in danger of leaving. The remaining islanders, Amber, Michael, Anton, Lucie, Tommy and Molly-Mae, had to choose one boy and one girl to dump from the island. The boys chose Arabella, and the girls chose Tom.
Week 5
Week 5	Coupling	On Day 31, the original Islanders were told that they would be re-coupling. They were only given the option to remain in their current couple or to choose one of the new Islanders. However, as the boys and the girls were living in separate villas, they were not aware of what the other one chose. If one decided to re-couple and the other did not, then they would be single but still remain on the island. If both re-coupled then they would both remain in the villa with their new partner, and any remaining single new islanders would be dumped. Already single, islanders Danny and Maura chose to couple up with Jourdan and Marvin respectively. Tommy and Molly-Mae, and Curtis and Amy remained together. Lucie picked George, Anton chose Belle, Michael coupled up with Joanna, and Anna went with Ovie. As Jordan and Amber's original partners failed to recouple with them, they were now single.
Week 5	Challenges	On Day 28, the Main Villa and Casa Amor competed in a game of "Sexy Charades". The challenge was won by Casa Amor.; On Day 29, the Main Villa and Casa Amor competed in "Raunchy Races" where they had to complete a certain task quicker than the other villa. The Main Villa won the challenge and won party for that evening.
Week 5	Dates	On Day 33, single islanders Amber and Jordan were given the opportunity to take another islander on a date. They chose Ovie and Anna respectively.
Week 5	Exits	On Day 30, new islanders Dan, Dennon, Stevie, Lavena, Maria and Nabila were dumped from the villa after failing to couple up.
Week 6	Entrances	On Day 37, Chris and Francesca entered the villa.
Week 6	Coupling	On Day 39, there was a recoupling where the girls chose the boys. Belle and Anton, Molly-Mae and Tommy and Joanna and Michael remained together. Francesca chose Curtis, Anna got back with Jordan, Amber chose Ovie and Maura chose Chris. Marvin was left single and therefore dumped from the villa.
Week 6	Challenges	On Day 38, the boys and girls competed in the 'Dirty Dancing' challenge where they had to raise the opposing teams heart rate the most. The challenge was won by the girls.; On Day 39, the boys competed in the 'Lad Points' challenge where they had to compete in a series of lad-culture based challenges. It was won by Anton and Marvin.; On Day 42, the islanders competed in the 'Snog, Marry, Pie' challenge where each islander had to snog, marry and pie an islander of the opposite gender.
Week 6	Dates	On Day 36, Anton and Belle left the villa to go on their first date.; On Day 38, new islanders Chris and Francesca were given the opportunity to take two islanders on dates. Chris chose Belle and Maura, whilst Francesca chose Ovie and Curtis.
Week 6	Exits	On Day 36, after the public voted for their favourite couple, it was announced that Amy and Curtis, Danny and Jourdan, and Lucie and George were the three couples with the fewest votes. Danny and Jourdan were then immediately dumped having been told they had received the fewest. It was then up to the safe islanders to pick a second couple to dump. They chose Lucie and George.; On Day 37, Amy decided to voluntarily leave the villa after Curtis left her for Maura.; On Day 39, Marvin was dumped from the island after failing to couple up.
Week 7	Entrances	On Day 44, Greg, Harley and India entered the villa.
Week 7	Coupling	On Day 46, there was a recoupling where the girls chose. Belle and Anton, Anna and Jordan and Molly-Mae and Tommy stayed together. India chose Ovie, Harley chose Chris, Maura chose Curtis, Amber chose Greg and Francesca was left with Michael.
Week 7	Challenges	On Day 44, the islanders competed in the 'Doggy Style' challenge where the boys were blindfolded and guided round a dog agility course by a girl. The challenge was won by Chris and Francesca.; On Day 46, the boys competed in the 'Men at Work' challenge where they had to complete a builder-themed obstacle course with a girl of their choice in the sexiest manner possible. The girls decided Ovie was the sexiest and therefore the winner.; On Day 47, the islanders competed in the 'Couples Quiz' where they had to answer questions about the person they are coupled up with. The quiz was won by Tommy and Molly-Mae.
Week 7	Dates	On Day 44, new islanders India, Harley and Greg were allowed to take an islander of their choice on a date. They chose Chris, Ovie and Amber respectively.; On Day 45, new islanders Greg, Harley and India got to take an islander on a breakfast date. They chose Maura, Michael and Ovie respectively.
Week 7	Exits	On Day 42, following a public vote for their favourite couple, Anna and Jordan, and Joanna and Michael were told that they had received the fewest votes and were at risk of being dumped. The remaining couples then had to vote for one of the at risk couples to save. Anna and Jordan were saved by their fellow islanders leaving Joanna and Michael at further risk. The islanders then had to pick which of these two to dump from the island. They chose Joanna.
Week 8	Challenges	On Day 50, the islanders competed in the 'Sidebar of Shame' where they were given a newspaper headline and the islanders had to throw drinks over the people they thought the newspaper headline was about.; On Day 52, the islanders were challenged with looking after a pretend baby. The challenge was won by Ovie and India and Tommy and Molly-Mae.; On Day 54, Curtis, Ovie, Greg and Tommy competed in the 'Undercover Lovers' challenge where they had to complete a series of peculiar tasks. The boys completed the challenge and won a cocktail party.
Week 8	Dates	On Day 49, Curtis and Maura left the villa to go on their first date.; On Day 50, Harley and Chris left the villa to go on their first date.; On Day 53, Greg and Amber, Curtis and Maura and Ovie and India went on their final dates.; On Day 54, Anton and Belle and Tommy and Molly-Mae went on their final dates.
Week 8	Exits	On Day 49, following a public vote, Anna and Jordan, Francesca and Michael, and Chris and Harley were announced as the three couples with the fewest votes. Each of the remaining couples had to vote to save one of the couples in danger. Having received the fewest votes from the fellow islanders, Francesca and Michael were dumped from the villa.; On Day 52, Anna and Jordan, and Chris and Harley were dumped from the island having received the fewest votes in a public vote.; On Day 56, after a secret vote by their fellow islanders, Anton and Belle, Curtis and Maura and Ovie and India were at risk from leaving the villa. After a public vote, Anton and Belle were dumped from the villa.

== Ratings ==
Official ratings are taken from BARB and include ITV2 +1. For the first time, catch-up service totals are added to the official ratings. Because the Saturday episodes are weekly catch-up episodes rather than nightly highlights, these are not included in the overall averages.

	Viewers (millions)								
	Week 1	Week 2	Week 3	Week 4	Week 5	Week 6	Week 7	Week 8	Week 9
Sunday		5.44	5.62	5.36	5.69	5.85	5.70	5.70	5.36
Monday	5.90	5.45	5.70	5.44	5.78	5.86	6.00	5.91	5.25
Tuesday	5.60	5.34	5.33	5.60	6.04	5.85	5.60	6.02	
Wednesday	5.74	5.53	5.31	5.02	6.15	5.93	5.73	5.76	
Thursday	5.55	5.49	5.37	5.37	5.96	5.71	5.71	5.36	
Friday	5.69	5.50	5.50	5.53	6.03	5.70	5.67	5.29	
Weekly average	5.70	5.46	5.47	5.39	5.94	5.81	5.73	5.67	5.31
Running average	5.70	5.58	5.54	5.51	5.59	5.62	5.64	5.65	5.61
Series average	5.61								
Unseen Bits		1.89	1.78	1.66	1.69	1.78	1.83	1.94	1.69
Aftersun		1.32	1.56	1.78	1.92	1.82	1.98	2.41	1.92

== Controversies ==
After ITV announced The Jeremy Kyle Show was cancelled following guest Steve Dymond's suicide, some fans called Love Island to be cancelled as well since former contestants Sophie Gradon and Mike Thalassitis also committed suicide. Fans also noted the show's negative portrayal of body image.

Some contestants, including Tommy Fury and Maura Higgins, have been criticised for using homophobic slurs on past social media posts. Higgins has also made unwanted sexual advances toward Fury, including using the term 'fanny flutters'. Regulator Ofcom received 486 complaints regarding Higgins's unwanted sexual advances toward Fury. Another 302 complaints were recorded about Lucie Donlan's poor treatment from other contestants, including partner Joe Garratt and islander Amy Hart reportedly gaslighting and bullying her respectively. Between 14 and 18 June, Ofcom heard 1,215 complaints.

=== Sherif Lanre's removal ===
On 11 June 2019, Sherif Lanre was removed for "breaking the rules" with no further explanation. His exit was not shown on screen. Fans speculated that producers were attempting to avoid further scandal.
