= Jon Clark =

British television personality

Jonathan Clark
- Born: 6 September 1989 (age 36); Essex, England
- Occupation(s): Reality television personality, builder
- Years active: 2015–present
- Known for: Love Island

Jonathan Clark is a British reality television personality and builder from Essex, who first rose to fame in 2015 by appearing on the first series of the ITV2 reality series Love Island where he came runner-up with fellow contestant Hannah Elizabeth. In 2016, he joined the cast of The Only Way Is Essex with his brother Chris Clark.

== Career ==
On 2 June 2015 it was announced that Jon would be starring in the revival series of Love Island. Shortly after joining the show he was coupled up with playboy bunny Hannah Elizabeth, where they came runner-up during the final on 15 July 2015. In February 2016, Jon joined the cast of semi-reality television programme The Only Way is Essex for the seventeenth series along with his brother Chris.

== Filmography ==
Year	Title	Role	Note
2015	Love Island	Himself	Contestant (Runner-up)
2016–2018	The Only Way Is Essex	Himself	Cast member
