= Indiyah Polack =

English media personality (born 1998)

- Born: 11 December 1998 (age 27); London, England
- Occupations: Television personality; presenter
- Years active: 2022–present

Indiyah Polack (born 11 December 1998) is an English media personality. Whilst working as a hotel waitress, she applied for the eighth series of the ITV2 dating series Love Island. She reached the final, finishing in third place. After the series, she was cast as a co-host of the Love Island: The Morning After podcast, as well as a regular panellist on Love Island: Aftersun. Polack has also competed on Cooking with the Stars in 2023 and Inside in 2026.

== Early and personal life ==
Polack was born on 11 December 1998 in London. Growing up, she attended an all-girls school. Polack has been vocal about suffering from acne growing up, admitting that it affected her confidence. Her career history includes working for Waitrose, as well as working as a hotel waitress.

Since 2022, Polack had been in a relationship with Dami Hope, with whom she partnered on Love Island. They split up in 2025. In 2025, Polack revealed that she had been diagnosed with ADHD. She stated that she was unsure of whether to talk about it publicly, afraid it would affect her career opportunities.

== Career ==
In 2022, Polack auditioned for the eighth series of the ITV2 dating series Love Island. She was successful and was cast as one of the original "islanders" for the series, entering on day one. Alongside Dami Hope, she reached the final and the pair finished in third place. In late August, weeks after her Love Island stint ended, Polack announced her first brand deal as a beauty ambassador for Boots. She also made a deal with fashion retailer PrettyLittleThing; Polack became the first ambassador chosen to front their marketplace scheme, which allowed shoppers to buy and sell preloved clothing. Towards the end of 2022, she appeared on an episode of ITV's Don't Hate the Playaz.

In January 2023, Polack was announced as a co-presenter of the Love Island: The Morning After podcast, alongside Sam Thompson. The pair were also contracted as regular panellists on Love Island companion series Love Island: Aftersun. In April of that year, she was announced as a contestant for the third series of the ITV1 competition series Cooking with the Stars. She was the third to be eliminated from the series.

In May 2023, Polack began co-presenting the PrettyLittleThing online series The Pink Courtroom alongside media personality Nella Rose. In July 2024, Polack was a guest presenter for Capital Xtra's breakfast show alongside Robert Bruce, standing in temporarily for regular host Shayna Marie. In December 2024, she appeared as a contestant on The Weakest Link. Polack served as one of the co-hosts for the MOBO Awards in 2024 and 2025. In 2026, she competed on the third series of Netflix's Inside. Polack announced her departure from Love Island: Aftersun and The Morning After podcast ahead of the 2026 series of Love Island.

== Filmography ==
=== Television ===
Year	Title	Role	Notes
2022	Love Island	Contestant	Series 8; third place
2023–2025	Love Island: Aftersun	Panellist	Main cast
2023	Cooking with the Stars	Contestant	Series 3; sixth place
2023	CelebAbility	Contestant	Series 7 Episode 4
2023–2025	The Pink Courtroom	Co-presenter	Main cast
2024–2025	MOBO Awards	Co-host	Hosted the 26th and 27th ceremonies
2024	The Weakest Link	Contestant	Christmas special
2026	Inside	Contestant	Series 3

=== Audio ===
Year	Title	Role
2023–2026	Love Island: The Morning After	Co-presenter
2024	Capital Xtra	Guest co-presenter
