= Hannah Elizabeth (TV personality) =

English model and television personality (born 1990)

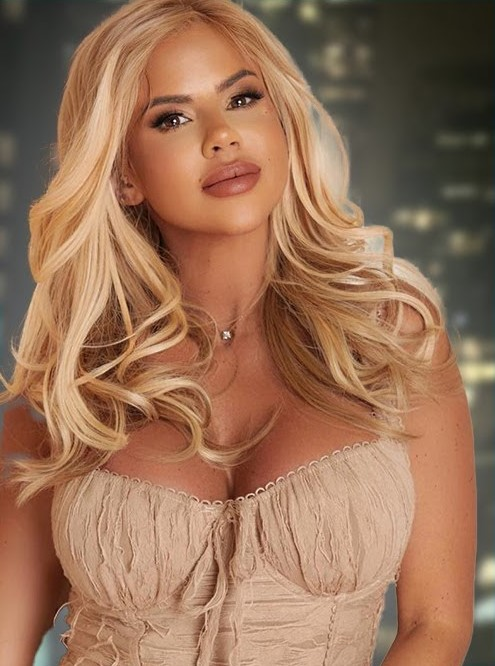
- Born: Hannah Elizabeth Owens; 9 March 1990 (age 36); Woolton, Liverpool, England
- Occupations: Model; television personality
- Years active: 2015–present
- Known for: Love Island; Love Island: All-Stars
- Children: 1

Hannah Elizabeth Owens (born 9 March 1990) is an English model and television personality. After embarking on a career as a model and beauty queen, she later became a Playboy Bunny and was runner-up of the first series of the ITV2 reality series Love Island alongside Jon Clark in 2015. Nine years later, she returned to compete in the spin-off series Love Island: All-Stars.

== Life and career ==
Hannah Elizabeth Owens was born on 9 March 1990 in Woolton, Liverpool. She began her career working as a beauty consultant, before embarking on a modelling career in which she entered various beauty pageants and was crowned Miss American Dream Europe 2011. Owens subsequently became a Playboy Bunny. In June 2015, Owens was announced as one of the contestants on the first series of the revived version of Love Island. Owens said her reason for signing up for the show was because she'd had the "[worst] luck with [men]" [...] and that she was going [on Love Island] to try and find someone adding that if she did then "that [would be] amazing", but if not it [would be] an amazing experience in the sun". Throughout the series, Owens became romantically involved with Jon Clark, who later proposed to her on the show. They reached the final and finished as runners-up behind Jess Hayes and Max Morley. They called off their engagement three months after the series ended.

Owens became engaged to her partner George Andreetti in March 2018, however they split in October 2019. A week after their split, Owens gave birth to the couple's first child, a son.

In January 2024, Owens returned to Love Island nine years after her initial appearance to appear on the spin-off Love Island: All-Stars.

== Filmography ==
As herself
Year	Title	Role	Ref.
2015	Love Island	Contestant; series 1	
2024	Love Island: All-Stars	Contestant	
