= Ovie Soko =

British basketball player (born 1991)

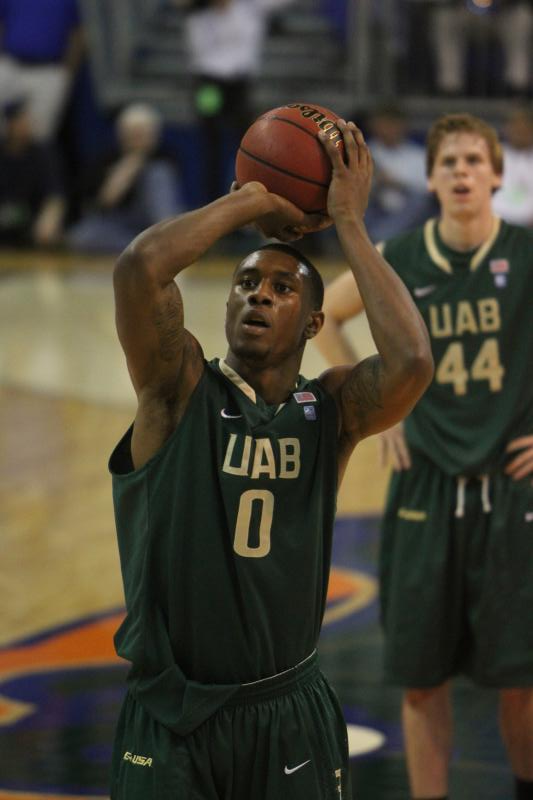
- Soko taking a free throw for UAB

Personal information
- Born: 7 February 1991 (age 35) Worcester Park, England
- Listed height: 6 ft 7 in (2.01 m)
- Listed weight: 220 lb (100 kg)

Career information
- High school: Bethel (Hampton, Virginia); Hampton Roads Academy (Newport News, Virginia)
- College: UAB (2009–2012); Duquesne (2013–2014)
- NBA draft: 2014: undrafted
- Playing career: 2014–2026
- Position: Small forward / power forward

Career history
- 2014–2015: Boulazac Dordogne
- 2015–2016: Trikala Aries
- 2016: Enel Brindisi
- 2016–2019: Murcia
- 2019–2020: London Lions
- 2020–2021: Le Mans Sarthe
- 2021–2022: Shiga Lakestars
- 2022–2026: London Lions

Career highlights
- French Basketball League Best Five (2021); All-Champions League First Team (2018); All-Champions League Second Team (2019); Third-team All-Atlantic 10 (2014)

Ovie Soko (born 7 February 1991) is a former British professional basketball player. Soko played college basketball for the University of Alabama at Birmingham and Duquesne University. He entered the 2014 NBA draft but he was not selected in the draft's two rounds.

In 2019, he joined the fifth series of British reality show Love Island. He placed third in the show.

== Early life ==
Soko attended at the Bethel High School in Hampton, Virginia where he averaged 14.5 points, 7.5 rebounds, 4.0 assists and 1.0 blocks per game during his lone season. He led the team field goal percentage (60%) and lead the Bruins to a 23-4 overall mark and district championship (16-2) as a wit. As a junior, Soko played at Hampton Roads Academy where he averaged 17.1 points, 8.6 rebounds, 2.3 steals and 1.5 blocks per game.

== College career ==
=== Alabama-Birmingham ===
In his freshman season at UAB, Soko played in 28 games with six starts as a true freshman. He averaged 1.5 points and 1.9 rebounds.

In his sophomore season, Soko played in 30 games with 29 starts being one of UAB's most improved players, averaging 9.1 points and 5.8 rebounds per game. He ranked second on the team in rebounding, field goal percentage (.505) and blocked shots (26) and closed the year by averaging 10.9 points and 6.1 rebounds while shooting 59.0 percent from the floor (33-of-56) over the Blazers final eight games.

In his junior season, he played in 30 games with 24 starts, averaging 8.3 points and 6.8 rebounds per game and led the team with 28 steals tied for second with 51 assists. He also changed from jersey number 32 to number 0 prior to the season.

=== Duquesne ===
In his senior season, Soko transferred to Duquesne where he started in all 30 games averaging a team-high 18.4 and 8.0 rebounds per game. He became the first Duquesne player since Bryant McAllister (19.7 ppg. in 2006) and seventh player in Duquesne history to lead the Atlantic 10 in scoring (18.4 ppg.). He was the only Atlantic 10 player ranked in the Top 10 in scoring and rebounding as well as the only forward ranked among the Atlantic 10's top 12 scorers.

== Professional career ==
=== Boulazac ===
Soko went undrafted in the 2014 NBA draft. On 2 August 2014 he signed a one-year deal with Boulazac Dordogneof the LNB Pro B.

=== Aries Trikala ===
On 24 August 2015 he signed with Aries Trikala of Greece for the 2015–16 season. He appeared in 19 games for Aries Trikala, averaging 16.5 points, 7.9 rebounds, 2.6 assists and 1.9 steals per game. On 10 April he signed a one-month deal with Enel Brindisi of the Serie A.

=== Murcia ===
On 5 August 2016 Soko joined UCAM Murcia of the Liga ACB. During the season, he averaged 6.3 points and 3.2 rebounds per game. On 1 July 2017 he renewed his contract for another season with Murcia. With Murcia, Soko played at the Champions League where he averaged 13 points and 7.4 rebounds per game, and he was named to the Basketball Champions League Star Lineup. On 11 July 2018 Soko re-signed with UCAM Murcia of the Liga ACB.

=== London Lions ===
On 20 November 2019 Soko signed with London Lions. He averaged 20.2 points and 8.2 rebounds per game.

=== Le Mans Sarthe ===
On 9 July 2020 Soko signed with Le Mans Sarthe of the LNB Pro A.

=== London Lions ===
On 8 July 2022, Soko signed with London Lions of the British BBL and the EuroCup Basketball. He re-signed with the club on 18 July 2025.

== Career statistics ==
=== BBL statistics ===
Year	Team	GP	GS	MPG	FG%	3P%	FT%	RPG	APG	SPG	BPG	PPG
2019-2020	London Lions	12	8	25.8	47.3	12.5	78	8.6	2.0	1.1	0.0	19.9

== National team career ==
Soko made his debut for the Great Britain Men's national team in a closed international test match against New Zealand on 24 July 2015. He led Great Britain to an 81–73 victory over No. 18 Germany in FIBA EuroBasket 2021 Qualifying on 24 February 2020. Soko scored 18 points and 10 rebounds.

== Love Island ==
Soko entered the fifth series of British reality show Love Island. Soko went on to finish in third place with India Reynolds.

== Modelling ==
Ovie announced on 26 August 2019 that he is partnering with ASOS.com along with his father, Raymond Soko, for an upcoming collection.

== Personal life ==
Soko was born in England to Nigerian parents.
