= Supermarket Sweep (British game show) =

British television game show

- Also known as: Dale's Supermarket Sweep (1998–2001, 2007)
- Genre: Game show
- Created by: Jamie Hardwick; Al Howard
- Based on: Supermarket Sweep by Al Howard
- Presented by: Dale Winton; Rylan Clark-Neal
- Announcer: Bobby Bragg; Gary King; Jennie McAlpine
- Composers: Richard Jacques; Marc Sylvan
- Country of origin: United Kingdom
- Original language: English
- No. of series: 10
- No. of episodes: 549 (original); 40 (20 unaired, 2007 revival); 45 (2019 revival)

Production
- Production locations: Television House (1993–2001); The Maidstone Studios (2007, 2019–20)
- Running time: 30 minutes (1993–2001, 2007); 60 minutes (2019–20)
- Production companies: Central in association with Talbot Television (1993–99); Grundy and Carlton (2000–01); Talkback Thames (2007); Thames (2019–20)

Original release
- Network: ITV
- Release: 6 September 1993 – 6 September 2001
- Release: 12 February – 31 August 2007
- Network: ITV2 (2019); ITV (2020)
- Release: 9 September 2019 – 19 December 2020

Supermarket Sweep is a British game show that is based on the original American version. Originally hosted by Dale Winton, it ran for eight years from 6 September 1993 to 6 September 2001 and then revived from 12 February to 31 August 2007 on ITV.

On 13 October 2017, it was announced that FremantleMedia had acquired the global rights to the format and confirmed that the series would return. A Fremantle representative stated that "the time is ripe to bring back this all-time favourite game show which has travelled with such success over the years." The company also stated that the new incarnation of the show would incorporate "modern technology" into the program which reflects 21st-century shopping habits. On 9 July 2019, it was officially confirmed that Rylan Clark-Neal would host a new revival of the show on ITV2 later that year.

== Format ==
The game consists of three teams of two, each with a clock that starts with 60 seconds on it. The teams then attempt to add as much time as possible to their clock by answering questions and riddles posed by the host. The time they accumulate determines how long they have in the 'Big Sweep' round to run around a studio mock-up of a supermarket, collecting shopping items. The team with the shopping trolley filled with items of the most value wins the chance to enter the final 'Super Sweep' prize round. Within the game there were a number of rounds.

=== Mini Sweep ===
The Mini Sweep is a question round. On answering a question correctly, they have 10 seconds added to their clock. The winning contestants are given a clue as to which item is required. The contestants then have to find the item with a "Supermarket Sweep" logo on within the supermarket and return to the start with it within 30 seconds for a bonus of £25 (£50 in the 2007 revival) to their sub total. In the 2019 revival, a spot prize is won if the contestants find the item with the "Supermarket Sweep" logo within 30 seconds.

=== Games ===
There are a variety of possible games each episode. Each correctly answered question or riddle is rewarded with 5 or 10 seconds added to the contestants' clock. Some games (such as Pick a Pair) offer a bonus 30 seconds if all contestants agree on an answer and that answer is correct.

Original games were: Counting Calories, Rhyme Time, In Betweens, Totals, Memory Game, Higher or Lower?, Pick a Pair, Random Reveal, Reverse Reveal, Scrambled Letters, and Dale's Bluff (renamed Rylan's Bluff in the 2019 version). These games were introduced later in the series: Wordsearch, Alphabet Soup, and Odd One Out.

New games were introduced in the 2019 version, which often feature guest appearances by other ITV-associated celebrities (usually those from Love Island), include: Stars and their Buys (guessing a celebrity from items on a receipt), Shop till you Drop (guessing how many of a particular item a celeb picks up before dropping any) and Rylan's Rummage (guessing an answer with a product from those provided)

=== Express Sweep ===
In the 2019 revival, one member of each team has 45 seconds to find all the items on Rylan's shopping list which have a "Supermarket Sweep" logo and put them into their basket. Each item is worth 5 seconds apart from one which is worth 10 seconds.

=== Scanagram ===
Introduced in 2020, this game, based on Scrambled Letters, sees one member of each team remain at their podium, whilst their partners each position themselves in the supermarket with a handheld scanner. The podium players are given an anagram of a product, followed by clues pointing to the answer. Once a contestant buzzes in with a correct answer, their partner has 15 seconds to find this item on the shelves and 'scan' it with their device. Players receive five seconds on their clock for a correctly solved anagram, and a further five for a fulfilled scan.

=== Round Robin/Dale's Daily/Supermarket Swap ===
If a team answer a question correctly, it wins 10 seconds, right or wrong, contestants then switch with their partners tasked with answering the next question. The categories can be: TV, Movies, Music, or Hot Gossip. In the 2019 revival, each correct answer wins the teams 5 seconds for their clocks and there were also "Supermarket Steal" questions in which if answered correctly allows a team to steal 5 seconds from an opposing team.

=== Big Sweep ===
This is the round where the contestants enter the aisles, starting with the team with the most time on their clocks and followed by the other two teams according to their times. The aim of this round is to gain as much value in their trolleys as possible in order to go on to the Super Sweep for the chance to win a cash prize (£2,000 in the original series, £5,000 for the 2007 series, £3,000 in the 2019 revival and £10,000 in the 2020 celebrity series), at the end of this round the value of the shopping is calculated. Contestants however, were not allowed to take more than three of any one item when loading their trollies unless a shopping list item called for more (for instance, six oranges or six bottles of tonic water). Various bonuses are available to boost their totals and there are penalties for dropped or broken items. The lowest ever total was recorded in a 1997 episode and constituted a "sub-total" of £0. However, they did some shopping. This resulted in a grand total of £56.

=== Bonuses ===
- Pick 'n' Mix: Introduced in series two. Players weigh 500g of five different varieties of sweets worth £50 on their subtotal.
- Free range: Fill up a carton of eggs for a £50 bonus. If a contestant breaks an egg while filling up the cartons, the bonus is no longer counted.
- Pricing gun: Players price up 12 cans or 12 juice cartons for a £50 bonus.
- Dale's Display: Players stack up a set of cans into a pyramid for a £50 bonus.
- Dale's Sale/Manager's Special: Introduced in series 3. The teams must find a tin (or other items on some occasions) marked with their own team colour for a bonus worth £50.
- Shopping List: A shopping list of 3 items is given to the contestants to find. All three must be collected for a bonus of £100. No partial credit can be given. This is the only circumstance in which more than three of an item can be allowed, and then only the amount dictated by the item.
- Inflatable bonuses: They are worth £25, £50, £75, or £100. Contestants are only allowed to collect one per team and do not know its value until after the sweep is complete. As discovered in the 2019 revival, if an inflatable had for some reason deflated, its value is rendered null and void.
- Loyalty Card: As was added in 2020, if contestants pick up a loyalty card from the gift card section of the supermarket, they could boost their shopping total by 5% or 10% or 15%. Just like with the inflatables, it was one per team and do not know its value until after the sweep is complete.

=== Inflatables ===
Every episode featured a shopping list and inflatable bonuses as standard. By series 3, two of the other aforementioned bonuses would also be featured on each episode. However, in the revived version, the bonuses were just Pick-n-Mix, Managers Special, the shopping list and inflatables. Inflatables included a Wine Bottle, Bunch of Bananas, Single Banana, Burger, Plant, Guitar, Cake, Hammer, Microphone, Crayon, Carrot, Jukebox, Saxophone, Fish, Lollipop, Devils Trident, Golf Club and Cactus which were added in 2007. In the 2019 revival, some of the inflatables that were added were Pizza, Ice Lolly, Mobile Phone, Monkey, Flamingo, Palm Tree, Watermelon, Keyboard, Pineapple, Stereo, Doughnut, Champagne Bottle and Cherries. Each inflatable had a price range from £25 to £100. The money would not be added in if a contestant deflates/pops the inflatable.

=== Penalties ===
A penalty of £25 (£10 in the 2019 version) is given by the host to teams who:

- Leave dropped items
- Break store items
- Knock over a display of stacked product (in this case, the player would be assessed a single penalty and not be penalized for each individual item)

The regular joke in the original was that there would also be a penalty for "banging into a cameraman". This would be added to the rules for the 2019 revival.

=== Super Sweep ===
The team with the higher Big Sweep total (added with their sub total from bonuses and previous rounds) keeps their money and advances to the Super Sweep. The team has 60 seconds to find the money (£2,000 in the original series, £5,000 in the 2007 revival, £3,000 in the 2019 revival, and £10,000 in the 2020 celebrity series), by solving three clues. The first clue is given and time does not start until the clue has been read. The team must find the item from the clue to get the next clue. The third clue leads the contestants to the final item, behind which the money is found. The team has to find all three items and have their hands on the money before time expires. If they are unsuccessful, they leave with the cash equivalent of the value of the goods in their trolley.

== Transmissions ==
Series	Start date	End date	Episodes	Presenter	Channel
1	6 September 1993	17 December 1993	75	Dale Winton	ITV
2	5 September 1994	16 December 1994	75	Dale Winton	ITV
3	4 September 1995	15 December 1995	75	Dale Winton	ITV
4	2 September 1996	13 December 1996	75	Dale Winton	ITV
5	2 September 1997 (Note: Season 5 was scheduled to debut on 1 September 1997, but was postponed to the following day due to news coverage of the death of Diana, Princess of Wales.)	19 December 1997	80	Dale Winton	ITV
6	1 September 1998	1 March 1999	84	Dale Winton	ITV
7	2 May 2000	6 September 2001	85	Dale Winton	ITV
8	12 February 2007	31 August 2007	40 (Note: Sixty episodes were produced, but 20 were left unaired after the show was taken off the air, and would not air until Challenge acquired the rights to Series 8 in 2009.)	Dale Winton	ITV
9	9 September 2019	4 October 2019	20	Rylan Clark-Neal	ITV2
10	1 September 2020	19 December 2020	25	Rylan Clark-Neal	ITV
