= Erik Jørgensen =

Erik Jørgensen may refer to:

== People ==
- Erik Jørgensen (athlete) (1920–2005), Danish middle-distance runner
- Erik Jørgensen (gunsmith) (1848–1896), Norwegian gunsmith
- Erik B. Jørgensen, Danish author and adventurer
- Erik M. Jorgensen, American biologist
- Erik Jorgensen (forester), Danish-Canadian forester and professor, pioneer in the field of urban forestry
- Erik Jorgensen (politician), Maine state representative

== Other ==
- Erik Jørgensen (brand), a Danish furniture company
