= Special Forces: World's Toughest Test =

American reality television series

- Also known as: Celebrity SAS: Who Dares Wins USA
- Genre: Reality television
- Based on: SAS: Who Dares Wins
- Presented by: Rudy Reyes; Jason 'Foxy' Fox; Mark 'Billy' Billingham; Remi Adeleke; Jovon Quarles
- Narrated by: Shaun Dooley
- Country of origin: United States
- Original language: English
- No. of seasons: 5
- No. of episodes: 45

Production
- Executive producers: Sophie Leonard; Alicia Kerr; Becky Clarke
- Production locations: Jordan (season 1); South Island (season 2); Wales (season 3); Morocco (season 4); Malaysia (season 5)
- Production companies: Banijay; Minnow Films

Original release
- Network: Fox
- Release: January 4, 2023 – present

Special Forces: World's Toughest Test is an American reality series that is quasi-military training television series that premiered on Fox on January 4, 2023. It is an adaptation of the British reality series SAS: Who Dares Wins and reuses Directing Staff (DS) instructors from that series.

== Format ==
Like the original British series, Special Forces: World's Toughest Test pits contestants, dubbed "recruits", against harsh environments all around the world in a shortened training course that is designed to replicate a number of elements of the actual United States Special Forces selection course, which is notoriously difficult and affects the lives of people who particiate in it. The show's Directing Staff (DS) take the recruits through hostile and unforgiving warfare environments, while testing their mental and physical ability through a series of tests. Unlike many reality competition series, there are no formal elimination points; instead, contestants may voluntarily withdraw or be medically withdrawn at any point prior to completion. They may also be disqualified for failing to complete specific steps of the course.

Through the order and variety of training exercises varies from season to season, the final two episodes of each season follow the remaining recruits as they train on escape and evasion during enemy attacks, followed by resistance to interrogation when captured by enemy forces. The latter portion of this stage reuses the same interrogation staff from the original British series, overseen by an anonymous former senior chief intelligence officer referred to as "the Umpire".

== Production ==
On September 7, 2022, it was announced that Fox had ordered the series, originally titled Special Forces: The Ultimate Test, with Sophie Leonard, Alicia Kerr and Becky Clarke as the executive producers. Youssef Louchi served as production supervisor on the series. The series premiered on January 4, 2023. Special Forces: World's Toughest Test season 1 was filmed in Jordan (Wadi Rum Desert). On May 15, 2023, Fox renewed the series for a second season which was filmed in New Zealand's South Island and premiered on September 25, 2023. On May 13, 2024, Fox renewed the series for a third season which was filmed in Wales, the home of British Special Forces Selection, and premiered on January 8, 2025 with 2-hour episodes over five weeks. On May 12, 2025, Fox renewed the series for a fourth season which was filmed in Morocco and premiered on September 25, 2025. On May 11, 2026, Fox renewed the series for a fifth season which was filmed in Malaysia and premiered on September 24, 2026.

== Cast ==
The Directing Staff (DS) instructors consist of British and American Special Forces veterans who have also presented ''SAS: Who Dares Wins'': Rudy Reyes, a former United States Recon Marine; Jason 'Foxy' Fox, a former SBS operator; Mark 'Billy' Billingham, an ex-SAS Sergeant Major; and Remi Adeleke, a veteran Navy SEAL Senior Chief. Adeleke did not return for Season 2, and was replaced by Jovon 'Q' Quarles, another veteran Navy SEAL. The series is narrated by Shaun Dooley, the same narrator for the original British series.

=== Recruits ===
==== Season 1 ====
Recruit	Celebrity	Known for	Status (Episode number)
4	Hannah Brown	The Bachelorette star	Passed (10)
8	Carli Lloyd	Former professional soccer player	Passed (10)
13	Dwight Howard	NBA player	Disqualified (10)
16	Danny Amendola	Former NFL wide receiver	Voluntarily Withdrawn (10)
10	Gus Kenworthy	Former Olympic freestyle skier	Medically Withdrawn (8)
5	Mike Piazza	Former MLB catcher	Voluntarily Withdrawn (8)
14	Kenya Moore	The Real Housewives of Atlanta star	Voluntarily Withdrawn (6)
6	Anthony Scaramucci	Former White House Communications Director	Voluntarily Withdrawn (6)
1	Beverley Mitchell	Actress & singer	Voluntarily Withdrawn (4)
9	Mel B	Spice Girls singer	Voluntarily Withdrawn (3)
15	Nastia Liukin	Former Olympic artistic gymnast	Voluntarily Withdrawn (3)
2	Jamie Lynn Spears	Actress & singer	Voluntarily Withdrawn (3)
7	Montell Jordan	Singer	Medically Withdrawn (2)
12	Tyler Florence	Chef & television host	Voluntarily Withdrawn (2)
3	Dr. Drew Pinsky	Media personality & physician	Medically Withdrawn (1)
11	Kate Gosselin	Reality television personality	Medically Withdrawn (1)

==== Season 2 ====
Recruit	Celebrity	Known for	Status (Episode number)
5	Tyler Cameron	The Bachelorette star	Passed (8)
6	Erin Jackson	Olympic speed skater	Passed (8)
12	Nick Viall	The Bachelor & The Bachelorette star	Passed (8)
3	JoJo Siwa	Dancer, singer & actress	Voluntarily Withdrawn (8)
4	Tom Sandoval	Vanderpump Rules star	Disqualified (8)
9	Bode Miller	Olympic alpine ski racer	Voluntarily Withdrawn (7)
1	Jack Osbourne	The Osbournes star	Medically Withdrawn (6)
14	Kelly Rizzo	Influencer & widow of Bob Saget	Voluntarily Withdrawn (4)
7	Savannah Chrisley	Chrisley Knows Best star	Voluntarily Withdrawn (3)
8	Robert Horry	Former NBA player	Voluntarily Withdrawn (3)
10	Brian Austin Green	Actor	Voluntarily Withdrawn (3)
13	Dez Bryant	Former NFL wide receiver	Voluntarily Withdrawn (2)
11	Blac Chyna	Model & actress	Voluntarily Withdrawn (2)
2	Tara Reid	Actress	Voluntarily Withdrawn (2)

==== Season 3 ====
Recruit	Celebrity	Known for	Status (Episode number) (Note: Episode numbers are based on the single one-hour episodes rather than the televised combined two-hour episodes.)
8	Kayla Nicole	Influencer & model	Passed (10)
12	Brody Jenner	The Hills star	Passed (10)
9	Golden Tate	Former NFL wide receiver	Disqualified (10)
16	Cam Newton	Former NFL quarterback	Disqualified (10)
11	Alana Blanchard	Surfer	Voluntarily Withdrawn (10)
2	Christy Carlson Romano	Actress & podcaster	Disqualified (8)
15	Kyla Pratt	Actress	Voluntarily Withdrawn (8)
10	Carey Hart	Former freestyle motocross racer	Medically Withdrawn (7)
14	Landon Donovan	Former professional soccer player	Medically Withdrawn (4)
1	Nathan Adrian	Olympic swimmer	Medically Withdrawn (3)
6	Marion Jones	Former Olympic track-and-field athlete	Medically Withdrawn (3)
7	Jordyn Wieber	Former Olympic gymnast	Voluntarily Withdrawn (3)
13	Trista Sutter	The Bachelorette star	Voluntarily Withdrawn (3)
4	Ali Manno	The Bachelorette star	Medically Withdrawn (2)
3	Denise Richards	Actress	Voluntarily Withdrawn (2)
5	Stephen Baldwin	Actor	Disqualified (2)

==== Season 4 ====
Recruit	Celebrity	Known for	Status (Episode number)
10	Shawn Johnson East	Former Olympic gymnast (Wife of Andrew East)	Passed (9)
18	Gia Giudice	Podcaster & Next Gen NYC star (Daughter of Teresa Giudice)	Passed (9)
2	Brianna "Chickenfry" LaPaglia	Podcaster & social media influencer	Disqualified (9)
4	Kody Brown	Sister Wives star	Disqualified (9)
11	Andrew East	Former NFL long snapper (Husband of Shawn Johnson East)	Disqualified (9)
14	Randall Cobb	Former NFL wide receiver	Voluntarily Withdrawn (8)
3	Mark Estes	TikTok influencer	Medically Withdrawn (7)
9	Christie Pearce Rampone	Former professional soccer player	Medically Withdrawn (7)
5	Jessie James Decker	Singer (Wife of Eric Decker)	Voluntarily Withdrawn (6)
6	Eric Decker	Former NFL wide receiver (Husband of Jessie James Decker)	Medically Withdrawn (6)
8	Chanel Iman	Supermodel	Disqualified (6)
7	Ravi V. Patel	Actor	Voluntarily Withdrawn (5)
13	Nick Young	Former NBA player	Voluntarily Withdrawn (5)
12	Johnny Manziel	Former NFL quarterback	Voluntarily Withdrawn (4)
16	Jussie Smollett	Actor & singer	Medically Withdrawn (3)
15	Eva Marcille	Actress & America's Next Top Model Season 3 winner	Disqualified (2)
17	Teresa Giudice	The Real Housewives of New Jersey star (Mother of Gia Giudice)	Voluntarily Withdrawn (2)
1	Brittany Cartwright	The Valley star	Voluntarily Withdrawn (1)

==== Season 5 ====
Recruit	Celebrity	Known for	Status (Episode number)
7	Collin Gosselin	Jon & Kate Plus 8 star	Passed (8)
8	Candace Cameron Bure	Actress	Passed (8)
15	Alexia Umansky	Buying Beverly Hills star (Daughter of Mauricio Umansky)	Passed (8)
11	Matt Barnes	Former NBA Player and Podcaster	Disqualified (8)
2	Hannah Stocking	Comedian	Disqualified (8)
9	David Charvet	Entrepreneur and Actor	Disqualified (8)
12	Alycia Baumgardner	World Champion Boxer	Voluntarily Withdrawn (8)
10	Maxim Naumov	Olympic Figure Skater	Medically Withdrawn (6)
3	Oliver Hudson	Actor	Voluntarily Withdrawn (6)
13	Breana Tiesi	Selling Sunset star	Voluntarily Withdrawn (6)
14	Mauricio Umansky	Buying Beverly Hills star (Father of Alexia Umansky)	Voluntarily Withdrawn (4)
1	Ruby Rose	Actress	Voluntarily Withdrawn (2)
4	George Santos	Former Politician	Voluntarily Withdrawn (2)
6	LeSean McCoy	Former NFL running back	Voluntarily Withdrawn (2)
5	Brandi Glanville	The Real Housewives of Beverly Hills star	Medically Withdrawn (1)

== Episodes ==
=== Series overview ===
Season	Episodes	Originally released	
Season	Episodes	First released	Last released
1	10	January 4, 2023	March 1, 2023
2	8	September 25, 2023	November 27, 2023
3	10	January 8, 2025	February 5, 2025
4	9	September 25, 2025	November 20, 2025
5	8	September 24, 2026	November 12, 2026

=== Season 1 (2023) ===
No. overall	No. in season	Title	Original release date	Prod. code	U.S. viewers (millions)
1	1	"Test of Character"	January 4, 2023	SFT-101	2.06
2	2	"Weakness"	January 4, 2023	SFT-102	2.06
3	3	"Mindset"	January 11, 2023	SFT-103	1.81
4	4	"Trust"	January 18, 2023	SFT-104	1.70
5	5	"Pressure"	January 25, 2023	SFT-105	1.73
6	6	"Fear"	February 1, 2023	SFT-106	1.77
7	7	"Resilience"	February 8, 2023	SFT-107	1.74
8	8	"Courage"	February 15, 2023	SFT-108	1.89
9	9	"Survival"	February 22, 2023	SFT-109	1.82
10	10	"Interrogation"	March 1, 2023	SFT-110	1.62

=== Season 2 (2023) ===
No. overall	No. in season	Title	Original release date	Prod. code	U.S. viewers (millions)
11	1	"Far from Home"	September 25, 2023	SFT-201	1.52
12	2	"Exposure"	October 2, 2023	SFT-202	1.36
13	3	"Panic"	October 9, 2023	SFT-203	1.29
14	4	"Character"	October 16, 2023	SFT-204	1.29
15	5	"Pressure"	November 6, 2023	SFT-205	1.17
16	6	"Survival"	November 13, 2023	SFT-206	1.23
17	7	"Grit"	November 20, 2023	SFT-207	1.16
18	8	"Capture"	November 27, 2023	SFT-208	1.17

=== Season 3 (2025) ===
No. overall	No. in season	Title	Original release date	Prod. code	U.S. viewers (millions)
19	1	"Ocean Warfare"	January 8, 2025	SFT-301	1.86
20	2	"Survival"	January 8, 2025	SFT-302	1.86
21	3	"Terror"	January 15, 2025	SFT-303	1.64
22	4	"Brotherhood"	January 15, 2025	SFT-304	1.64
23	5	"Panic"	January 22, 2025	SFT-305	1.39
24	6	"Trust"	January 22, 2025	SFT-306	1.39
25	7	"Duty"	January 29, 2025	SFT-307	1.44
26	8	"Resilience"	January 29, 2025	SFT-308	1.44
27	9	"On the Run"	February 5, 2025	SFT-309	1.40
28	10	"Capture"	February 5, 2025	SFT-310	1.40

=== Season 4 (2025) ===
No. overall	No. in season	Title	Original release date	Prod. code	U.S. viewers (millions)
29	1	"Behind Enemy Lines"	September 25, 2025	SFT-401	1.17
30	2	"Survival"	October 2, 2025	SFT-402	1.30
31	3	"Warzone"	October 9, 2025	SFT-403	1.17
32	4	"Mind Set"	October 16, 2025	SFT-404	1.22
33	5	"Trust"	October 23, 2025	SFT-405	1.10
34	6	"Grit"	October 30, 2025	SFT-406	1.38
35	7	"Composure"	November 6, 2025	SFT-407	1.07
36	8	"Evasion"	November 13, 2025	SFT-408	1.18
37	9	"Interrogation"	November 20, 2025	SFT-409	1.11

=== Season 5 (2026) ===
No. overall	No. in season	Title	Original release date	Prod. code	U.S. viewers (millions)
38	1	"Jungle Warfare"	September 24, 2026	SFT-501	N/A
39	2	"Duty"	October 1, 2026	SFT-502	N/A
40	3	"Trust"	October 8, 2026	SFT-503	1.22
41	4	"Leadership"	October 15, 2026	SFT-504	N/A
42	5	"Grit"	October 22, 2026	SFT-505	TBD
43	6	"Breaking Point"	October 29, 2026	SFT-506	TBD
44	7	"Survival"	November 5, 2026	SFT-507	TBD
45	8	"Interrogation"	November 12, 2026	SFT-508	TBD

== Ratings ==
Viewership and ratings per episode of Special Forces: World's Toughest Test
No.	Title	Air date	Timeslot (ET)	Rating (18–49)	Viewers (millions)	DVR (18–49)	DVR viewers (millions)	Total (18–49)	Total viewers (millions)	Ref.
1	"Test of Character"	January 4, 2023	Wednesday 8:00 p.m.	0.4	2.06	TBD	TBD	TBD	TBD	
2	"Weakness"	January 4, 2023	Wednesday 9:00 p.m.	0.4	2.06	TBD	TBD	TBD	TBD	
3	"Mindset"	January 11, 2023	Wednesday 9:00 p.m.	0.4	1.81	TBD	TBD	TBD	TBD	
4	"Trust"	January 18, 2023	Wednesday 9:00 p.m.	0.3	1.70	TBD	TBD	TBD	TBD	
5	"Pressure"	January 25, 2023	Wednesday 9:00 p.m.	0.3	1.73	TBD	TBD	TBD	TBD	
6	"Fear"	February 1, 2023	Wednesday 9:00 p.m.	0.3	1.77	TBD	TBD	TBD	TBD	
7	"Resilience"	February 8, 2023	Wednesday 9:00 p.m.	0.3	1.74	TBD	TBD	TBD	TBD	
8	"Courage"	February 15, 2023	Wednesday 9:00 p.m.	0.4	1.89	TBD	TBD	TBD	TBD	
9	"Survival"	February 22, 2023	Wednesday 9:00 p.m.	0.4	1.82	TBD	TBD	TBD	TBD	
10	"Interrogation"	March 1, 2023	Wednesday 9:00 p.m.	0.3	1.62	TBD	TBD	TBD	TBD	

== Syndication ==
In 2023, Season 1 was syndicated to E4, part of Channel 4 in the UK, where the series is known as Celebrity SAS: Who Dares Wins USA.
