= Celebrity Sabotage =

2026 British TV series

- Genre: Reality
- Created by: Ed Daggett
- Starring: Joel Dommett; Judi Love; Sam Thompson; GK Barry
- Country of origin: United Kingdom
- Original language: English
- No. of series: 1
- No. of episodes: 6

Production
- Running time: 60 minutes
- Production company: Lifted Entertainment

Original release
- Network: ITV
- Release: 21 March 2026 – present

Celebrity Sabotage is a British hidden camera reality television series which premiered on 21 March 2026 on ITV1 and ITVX. This show was produced by Lifted Entertainment, who also produced Ant & Dec's Saturday Night Takeaway.

== Format ==
The series follows the concept of a hidden camera prank show, similar to that of Impractical Jokers. Celebrities have to prank contestants in a fake game show in order to win them a cash prize which will be split equally between them. Many of the show's pranks include disrupting a wedding photoshoot, and sabotaging a wellness retreat face mask session. The four main saboteurs are Joel Dommett, Judi Love, Sam Thompson and GK Barry and each episode they are joined by a celebrity guest saboteur, including Jill Scott, Fay Ripley, Olivia Attwood, Jo Brand, Guz Khan and Harry Redknapp. the fake game show hosts include Emma Willis, Matt Willis, Sara Davies and Clare Balding.

== Production ==
The series was announced by ITV Studios in 2025. Each episode is 1 hour long.

== Episodes ==
Series 1
Episode	Date	Show	Host	Guest saboteur
1	21 March 2026	The Applicant	Sara Davies	Jo Brand
2	28 March 2026	Couple Goals	Matt and Emma Willis	Olivia Attwood
3	4 April 2026	The Great Kitchen Cook Off	Monica Galetti	Jill Scott
4	11 April 2026	SOS: Survive Or Surrender	Jason Fox	Guz Khan
5	18 April 2026	The Perfect Pooch	Clare Balding	Harry Redknapp
6	25 April 2026	The Backstabber	Rylan Clark	Fay Ripley

== Reception ==
The programme received mixed reception. The "chaotic format" was described as messy, with other viewers suggesting the show would have been better suited to an earlier timeslot.
