= Sam Thompson (TV personality) =

English television personality and radio presenter (born 1992)

Samuel Thompson
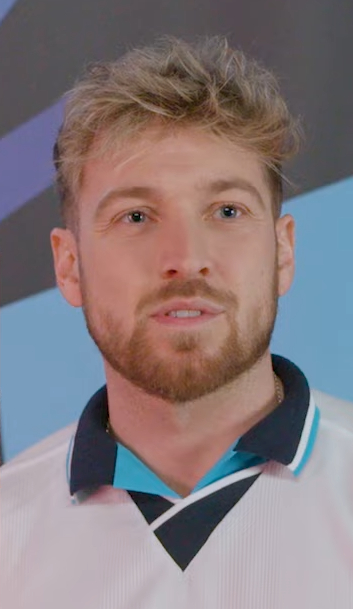
- Thompson in 2024
- Born: Samuel Robert De Courcy Thompson; 2 August 1992 (age 34); London, England
- Occupations: Television personality; radio presenter
- Partner: Zara McDermott (2019–2024) Talitha Balinska (2026–present)
- Relatives: Louise Thompson (sister)

Sam Robert De Courcy Thompson (born 2 August 1992) is a British television personality and radio presenter from London.

Between 2013 and 2021, he appeared in Made in Chelsea. He is also known for appearing as a contestant on Celebrity Big Brother, Celebrity SAS: Who Dares Wins, finishing in third place, on Celebrity Coach Trip, and several times on Celebs Go Dating. In 2022, he started hosting a Sunday radio show on Hits Radio. In 2023, he began appearing as a regular panellist on Love Island: Aftersun, as well as co-hosting the Love Island: The Morning After podcast. He won the 23rd series of I'm a Celebrity...Get Me Out of Here!. Since 2024, he has presented I'm a Celebrity... Unpacked alongside Joel Dommett and Kemi Rodgers.

== Career ==
=== Television ===
In 2013, he was cast on the E4 reality series Made in Chelsea. Thompson left the show for a time but later returned.

In 2017, he was a housemate on Celebrity Big Brother 20. He finished in third behind Sarah Harding and Amelia Lily. In 2018, 2019 and 2020, he appeared on the fourth, sixth and the ninth series for guest appearance on Celebs Go Dating, making Thompson the most frequent cast member on the show. In 2019, Sam was a contestant on the Celebrity Coach Trip 4. He was also on Celebrity SAS: Who Dares Wins, where he was shouted at by Ant Middleton.

In 2021, Thompson was on The Celebrity Circle with Pete Wicks, and they came second. Thompson also posts regularly on TikTok, partaking in pranks, dances and creates various other videos.

In January 2023, it was announced that Thompson would be a regular panellist on Love Island: Aftersun, alongside Indiyah Polack, as well as the new hosts of the podcast Love Island: The Morning After. Thompson left the podcast in 2024, but remained as a rotating panellist on Aftersun until he announced his departure ahead of the 2026 series.

In December 2023, Thompson won the twenty-third series of I'm a Celebrity...Get Me Out of Here!.

In 2024, Thompson cameos in the UK version of Inside Out 2 as Security Man Sam, a character who finds himself on a chase with the emotions.

=== Radio ===
In February 2022, Thompson joined Hits Radio, initially presenting the Sunday breakfast show. From January 2023 until March 2025 he presented the Monday to Thursday evening shows. Additionally, as of May 2023, he currently presents the Sunday chart show. Since April 2025 he presents the Saturday morning show.

== Charity Work ==
In June 2025, Thompson took part in the UNICEF Match Ball Relay as part of Soccer Aid, completing a 260-mile journey from Stamford Bridge in London to Old Trafford in Manchester. The challenge combined running and cycling over five days and was broadcast in segments on ITV's This Morning. Despite sustaining a calf injury during the journey, Thompson completed the route and helped raise over £2 million for UNICEF. He garnered support from public figures, including Prime Minister Keir Starmer.

== Personal life ==
Thompson was born to Michael and Karen Thompson. He is a Chelsea F.C. supporter. He was educated at Bradfield College. His mother is a property developer, and has featured in cameos with his sister, Louise Thompson, in the reality TV series, Made in Chelsea. In 2023, he was diagnosed with ADHD, tic disorder and autism. He was in a relationship with Zara McDermott for 5 years until January 2025. He revealed that he needed therapy following his break-up. He is close friends with fellow television personality Pete Wicks, since meeting in 2018. Sam is now dating DJ and model Talitha Balinska. The pair first met in 2023 at a photo shoot before meeting later.

== Filmography ==
Television
Year	Title	Notes
2013–2021	Made in Chelsea	Cast member
2015	Celebrity Fifteen to One	Contestant
2017	Celebrity Big Brother	Housemate; 3rd place
2017	Sunday Brunch	Guest
2018	Celebs Go Dating	Cast member
2018	I'm a Celebrity: Extra Camp	
2018	CelebAbility	Guest
2018	Celebrity Ghost Hunt	Contestant
2019	Celebrity Coach Trip	Contestant
2019	Celebs Go Dating	Cast member
2019	Celebrity SAS: Who Dares Wins	Contestant
2020	The Wheel	Celebrity expert
2020	I'm a Celebrity...The Daily Drop	Guest
2021	The Celebrity Circle	Contestant; 2nd place
2021	Steph's Packed Lunch	
2021	Tipping Point: Lucky Stars	Contestant
2021	CelebAbility	
2021	Take Off with Bradley & Holly	
2021	Football Focus	
2023–2025	Love Island: Aftersun	Regular panellist
2023	I'm a Celebrity...Get Me Out of Here!	Contestant; Winner
2024	Ant & Dec's Saturday Night Takeaway	Guest on Singalong Live with JLS
2024	I'm A Celebrity... Unpacked	Co-presenter, roving reporter
2024	Celebrity Deal or No Deal (British game show)	Player
2025 -2026	Gladiators	Contestant, runner-up
2026	Celebrity Sabotage	Presenter/Celebrity Saboteur

Audio
Year	Title	Notes
2022	Sunday breakfast	Hits Radio presenter
2023–2024	Love Island: The Morning After	Co-host, with Indiyah Polack
2023–2025	The Hits Radio Evening Show with Sam Thompson	Hits Radio presenter
2023–	The Hits Radio UK Chart Show	Hits Radio presenter
2025–	Saturday morning	Hits Radio presenter

Preceded by Jill Scott	I'm a Celebrity... Get Me Out of Here! Winner & King of the Jungle; 2023	Succeeded by Danny Jones
