= SAS Australia =

SAS Australia may refer to:

- Special Air Service Regiment, a special forces unit of the Australian Army
- SAS Australia: Who Dares Wins, a reality TV show that features military-style training
