= SAS UK =

SAS UK may refer to:

- Special Air Service – a special forces unit of the British Army
- SAS: Who Dares Wins – a reality television show that features military-style training
