= SAS Australia: Who Dares Wins =

Reality television show

- Also known as: SAS Australia
- Genre: Reality
- Created by: Minnow Films
- Based on: SAS: Who Dares Wins
- Directed by: Nick Davies; Jo Siddiqui
- Starring: Ant Middleton; Mark Billingham; Jason Fox; Matthew Ollerton; Clint Emerson; Dean Stott; Anthony Stazicker; Jay Morton; Rudy Reyes; Chris Oliver
- Country of origin: Australia
- Original language: English
- No. of seasons: 4 (Celebrity edition); 1 (Civilian edition)
- No. of episodes: 50 (Celebrity edition); 4 (Civilian edition)

Production
- Executive producer: Matt Apps
- Running time: 60 minutes
- Production company: Screentime

Original release
- Network: Seven Network
- Release: 19 October 2020 – present

SAS Australia, originally called SAS Australia: Who Dares Wins, is a reality quasi-military training television programme based on the original British SAS: Who Dares Wins that was broadcast on Seven Network between 19 October 2020 and 1 November 2023. Upon release of the first season, the show's name was changed to simply SAS Australia. The series featured four ex-Special Forces soldiers acting as the directing staff (DS), with Ant Middleton as the chief instructor.

In June 2024 it was announced, that the production of the show was halted or "cancelled" for the year by Seven Network. The series was not mentioned at Seven’s 2025 upfronts and the future of the series is unknown. In October 2025, a celebrity version was renewed with a Australia vs United Kingdom format which aired in 2026.

== Cast ==
The Directing Staff instructors for the most recent domestic season included Ant Middleton, ex-UK Special Forces operator and Royal Marine Commando; Matthew 'Ollie' Ollerton, former Special Boat Service-operator; Anthony 'Staz' Stazicker and Jay Morton.

Former staff instructors included Jason 'Foxy' Fox, ex-SBS operator; Mark 'Billy' Billingham, an ex-SAS Sergeant Major; former Navy SEAL-operator Clint Emerson and Dean Stott, former SAS-operator.

Name	Position	Series				
Name	Position	1 (2020)	2 (2021)	3 (2022)	4 (2023)	Vs UK (2026)
Ant Middleton	Chief Instructor (1-4)	Main				
Matthew Ollerton	Directing Staff	Main				
Jason Fox	Directing Staff	Main				Main
Mark Billingham	Directing Staff / Chief Instructor (5)	Main				Main
Clint Emerson	Directing Staff			Main		
Dean Stott	Directing Staff			Main		
Anthony Stazicker	Directing Staff				Main	
Jay Morton	Directing Staff				Main	
Rudy Reyes	Directing Staff					Main
Chris Oliver	Directing Staff					Main

== Celebrity edition ==
Series	Episodes	Originally released	
Series	Episodes	First released	Last released
1	12	19 October 2020	24 November 2020
2	14	13 September 2021	13 October 2021
3	14	21 February 2022	29 March 2022
4	10	9 October 2023	1 November 2023
5	TBA	29 April 2026	TBA

=== Season 1 (2020) ===
Production began in March 2020 on location in Queenstown, New Zealand, however production was halted due to the COVID-19 pandemic. They recommenced filming on a property on the outskirts of Berridale in the Snowy Mountains of New South Wales in Australia at GPS Coordinates 36°28′44″S 149°0′37″E. Production crew stayed locally in Jindabyne while filming.

Olympian Jana Pittman was reported to be a contestant in the March 2020 production, but with her pregnancy in the intervening months, was replaced by former The Biggest Loser Australia trainer Shannan Ponton. Pittman subsequently appeared, as a contestant in Season 2, six months after giving birth.

- Full list of confirmed celebrities:

Recruit	Celebrity	Known for	Episode left	Status
1	Roxy Jacenko	Businesswoman & socialite	1	Voluntarily Withdrawn
2	Candice Warner	Retired Ironwoman	10	Culled
3	Jackson Warne	Poker player & son of Shane Warne	8	Voluntarily Withdrawn
4	Arabella Del Busso	Con Woman to Josh Reynolds	2	Voluntarily Withdrawn
5	Molly Taylor	Rally car driver	12	Voluntarily Withdrawn
6	Nick Cummins	Former rugby player and former Bachelor	12	Passed
7	Erin McNaught	Miss Universe Australia 2006	11	Voluntarily Withdrawn
8	Shannan Ponton	Fitness professional	11	Voluntarily Withdrawn
9	Schapelle Corby	Former convicted drug trafficker	2	Voluntarily Withdrawn
10	Merrick Watts	Comedian & former radio host	12	Passed
11	Firass Dirani	Actor	10	Culled
12	James Magnussen	Retired swimmer	12	Culled
13	Shayna Jack	Suspended swimmer	5	Voluntarily Withdrawn
14	Sabrina Frederick	AFLW player	12	Passed
15	Mitchell Johnson	Retired cricketer	4	Voluntarily Withdrawn
16	Ali Oetjen	The Bachelorette Australia bachelorette	6	Voluntarily Withdrawn
17	Eden Dally	Love Island Australia star	5	Voluntarily Withdrawn

==== Ratings ====
No.	Title	Air date	Timeslot	Overnight ratings		Consolidated ratings		Total viewers	Ref(s)
No.	Title	Air date	Timeslot	Viewers	Rank	Viewers	Rank	Total viewers	Ref(s)
1	Character	19 October 2020	Monday 7:30 pm	834,000	5	118,000	4	952,000	
2	Fear	20 October 2020	Tuesday 7:30 pm	795,000	5	100,000	5	895,000	
3	Mindset	26 October 2020	Monday 7:30pm	770,000	8	109,000	8	879,000	
4	Teamwork	27 October 2020	Tuesday 7:30pm	676,000	8	106,000	7	782,000	
5	Resilience	2 November 2020	Monday 7:30pm	671,000	8	126,000	7	797,000	
6	Focus	3 November 2020	Tuesday 7:30pm	654,000	11	107,000	10	761,000	
7	Pressure	9 November 2020	Monday 7:30pm	584,000	14	118,000	14	702,000	
8	Strength	10 November 2020	Tuesday 7:30pm	502,000	9	121,000	8	703,000	
9	Trust	16 November 2020	Monday 7:30 pm	676,000	6	105,000	5	781,000	
10	Determination	17 November 2020	Tuesday 7:30 pm	668,000	7	109,000	6	777,000	
11	Survival	23 November 2020	Monday 7:30 pm	728,000	5	90,000	5	818,000	
12	Courage	24 November 2020	Tuesday 7:30 pm	737,000	5	93,000	4	830,000	

=== Season 2 (2021) ===
In October 2020, the series was renewed for a second season. The second season began airing on 13 September 2021.

The season was filmed in the Capertee Valley in NSW, with the camp being constructed in the Glen Davies Ruins. The Ruins are the remains of the Oil Shale Ruins, which began operation in 1938 and ceased operation in 1952. The Glen Davis Ruins are on private property, but is available to visitors on a Saturday at 2pm.

Full list of confirmed celebrities:

Recruit	Celebrity	Known for	Episode left	Status
1	Emma Husar	Former politician	3	Voluntarily Withdrawn
2	Koby Abberton	Bra Boy	9	Voluntarily Withdrawn
3	Brynne Edelsten	Socialite	1	Voluntarily Withdrawn
4	Jana Pittman	Dual Olympian in athletics and bobsleigh	13	Culled
5	Pete Murray	Singer-songwriter	4	Medically Withdrawn
6	Manu Feildel	Celebrity chef	3	Voluntarily Withdrawn
7	Jett Kenny	Ironman	10	Voluntarily Withdrawn
8	Isabelle Cornish	Actor	9	Voluntarily Withdrawn
9	Dan Ewing	Actor	13	Culled
10	Erin Holland	TV Presenter	2	Voluntarily Withdrawn
11	Mark Philippoussis	Former tennis player	13	Culled
12	Bonnie Anderson	Singer/actor	6	Voluntarily Withdrawn
13	Kerri Pottharst	Beach volleyball Olympian	6	Voluntarily Withdrawn
14	John Steffensen	Olympic runner	13	Culled
15	Heath Shaw	AFL Star	10	Voluntarily Withdrawn
16	Sam Burgess	Former rugby league player	13	Passed
17	Alicia Molik	Former tennis player	4	Voluntarily Withdrawn
18	Jessica Peris	Sprinter	10	Voluntarily Withdrawn

==== Ratings ====
No.	Title	Air date	Timeslot	Overnight ratings		Consolidated ratings		Total viewers	Ref(s)
No.	Title	Air date	Timeslot	Viewers	Rank	Viewers	Rank	Total viewers	Ref(s)
1	Ego	13 September 2021	Monday 7:30 pm	647,000	10	111,000	6	749,000	
2	Courage	14 September 2021	Tuesday 7:30 pm	626,000	9	125,000	6	751,000	
3	Control	15 September 2021	Wednesday 7:30 pm	654,000	8	127,000	6	781,000	
4	Aggression	20 September 2021	Monday 7:30 pm	620,000	12	76,000	7	696,000	
5	Leadership	21 September 2021	Tuesday 7:30pm	586,000	11	107,000	9	693,000	
6	Mindset	22 September 2021	Wednesday 7:30pm	606,000	11	78,000	8	684,000	
7	Fear	27 September 2021	Monday 7:30pm	599,000	14	107,000	8	706,000	
8	Confidence	28 September 2021	Tuesday 7:30pm	592,000	10	95,000	8	687,000	
9	Oppo	29 September 2021	Wednesday 7:30 pm	643,000	8	80,000	6	723,000	
10	Grit	4 October 2021	Monday 7:30 pm	597,000	12	79,000	8	676,000	
11	Pressure	5 October 2021	Tuesday 7:30 pm	565,000	12	90,000	10	655,000	
12	Drive	11 October 2021	Monday 7:30 pm	585,000	12	81,000	8	666,000	
13	Determination	12 October 2021	Tuesday 7:30 pm	631,000	8	99,000	6	730,000	
14	Debrief	13 October 2021	Wednesday 7:30 pm	474,000	13	84,000	11	558,000	

=== Season 3 (2022) ===
The third season began airing on 21 February 2022.

Full list of celebrities were confirmed in October 2021:

Recruit	Celebrity	Known for	Episode left	Status
1	Ebanie Bridges	Champion boxer	11	Culled
2	Paul Fenech	Comedian	9	Voluntarily Withdrawn
3	Melissa Tkautz	Singer/Actor	2	Voluntarily Withdrawn
4	Barry Hall	Retired AFL player	7	Voluntarily Withdrawn
5	Geoff Huegill	Olympic swimmer	10	Voluntarily Withdrawn
6	Melissa Wu	Olympic diver	12	Voluntarily Withdrawn
7	Riana Crehan	Motorsports presenter	13	Passed
8	Darius Boyd	Retired NRL player	13	Passed
9	Orpheus Pledger	Actor	2	Voluntarily Withdrawn
10	Locky Gilbert	Reality TV star	13	Culled
11	Simone Holtznagel	Model	4	Voluntarily Withdrawn
12	Anna Heinrich	TV personality	11	Voluntarily Withdrawn
13	Richard Buttrose	Convicted drug dealer	6	Culled
14	Ellia Green	Rugby player	5	Voluntarily Withdrawn
15	Millie Boyle	NRLW player	13	Passed
16	Wayne Carey	AFL commentator	5	Voluntarily Withdrawn
17	Michael Zerafa	Professional boxer	2	Medically Withdrawn

==== Ratings ====
No.	Title	Air date	Timeslot	Overnight ratings		Consolidated ratings		Total viewers	Ref(s)
No.	Title	Air date	Timeslot	Viewers	Rank	Viewers	Rank	Total viewers	Ref(s)
1	Guts	21 February 2022	Monday 7:30 pm	467,000	14	122,000	9	589,000	
2	Panic	22 February 2022	Tuesday 7:30 pm	378,000	14	139,000	10	517,000	
3	Adaptability	23 February 2022	Wednesday 7:30 pm	365,000	15	127,000	10	492,000	
4	Mindset	28 February 2022	Monday 7:30 pm	372,000	17	93,000	14	465,000	
5	Leadership	1 March 2022	Tuesday 7:30pm	422,000	12	110,000	9	532,000	
6	Aggression	7 March 2022	Monday 7:30pm	383,000	16	114,000	13	497,000	
7	Fear	8 March 2022	Tuesday 7:30pm	345,000	15	91,000	11	436,000	
8	Pressure	14 March 2022	Monday 7:30pm	362,000	17	88,000	15	450,000	
9	Courage	15 March 2022	Tuesday 7:30pm	393,000	14	80,000	9	473,000	
10	Resilience	21 March 2022	Monday 7:30pm	313,000	20	98,000	14	411,000	
11	Focus	22 March 2022	Tuesday 7:30pm	373,000	14	82,000	9	455,000	
12	Strength	28 March 2022	Monday 7:30pm	329,000	20	97,000	15	426,000	
13	Selection	29 March 2022	Tuesday 7:30pm	350,000	15	71,000	12	421,000	
14	Debrief	29 March 2022	Tuesday 8:40pm	276,000	—N/a	70,000	15	346,000	

=== Season 4 (2023) ===
The fourth season began airing on 9 October 2023.

It was the first season of SAS Australia to be filmed outside Australia, on Wadi Rum Desert at Jordan. The camp was set on an abandoned Military Outpost at the Valley.

Full list of celebrities were confirmed in March 2023:

Recruit	Celebrity	Known for	Episode left	Status
4	Abbey Holmes	AFL Field Commentator	10	Culled
5	Anthony Mundine	World Champion Boxer	5	Voluntarily Withdrawn
8	Boyd Cordner	Retired NRL star	2	Medically Withdrawn
1	Cassie Sainsbury	Convicted drug smuggler	2	Voluntarily Withdrawn
7	Craig Challen	Thai Cave rescue hero	10	Culled
9	Craig McLachlan	Actor	8	Voluntarily Withdrawn
3	Jason Akermanis	AFL Hall of Famer	1	Voluntarily Withdrawn
12	Lindy Klim	Balinese Princess	2	Voluntarily Withdrawn
6	Mahalia Murphy	International Rugby Star	9	Voluntarily Withdrawn
13	Matthew Mitcham	Olympic Gold Diver	10	Passed
10	Peter Bol	Olympic Runner	6	Voluntarily Withdrawn
11	Stephanie Rice	Olympic Gold Swimmer	4	Medically Withdrawn
14	Tim Robards	OG Bachelor	10	Passed
2	Zima Anderson	Actress	7	Medically Withdrawn

==== Ratings ====
No.	Title	Air date	Timeslot	Overnight ratings		Consolidated ratings		Total viewers	Ref(s)
No.	Title	Air date	Timeslot	Viewers	Rank	Viewers	Rank	Total viewers	Ref(s)
1	Surrender	9 October 2023	Monday 7:30 pm	464,000	13	—N/a	—N/a	894,000	
2	Panic	10 October 2023	Tuesday 7:30 pm	458,000	9	—N/a	—N/a	889,000	
3	Precision	11 October 2023	Wednesday 7:30 pm	402,000	12	—N/a	—N/a	861,000	
4	Survival	16 October 2023	Monday 7:30 pm	430,000	14	—N/a	—N/a	819,000	
5	Trust	17 October 2023	Tuesday 7:30 pm	401,000	11	—N/a	—N/a	786,000	
6	Aggression	23 October 2023	Monday 7:30 pm	413,000	16	—N/a	—N/a	807,000	
7	Pressure	24 October 2023	Tuesday 7:30 pm	426,000	10	—N/a	—N/a	843,000	
8	Courage	30 October 2023	Monday 7:30 pm	381,000	14	—N/a	—N/a	738,000	
9	Grit	31 October 2023	Tuesday 7:30 pm	384,000	11	—N/a	—N/a	733,000	
10	Bravery	1 November 2023	Wednesday 7:30 pm	351,000	12	—N/a	—N/a	747,000	

=== Season 5: Australia vs England (2026) ===
In October 2025, a fifth celebrity season was renewed by Seven during their annual upfronts titled "SAS: Australia vs England", which will see seven Australian celebrities and seven UK celebrities go against each other in the Moroccan desert, the Australian celebrities were revealed on the day. In December 2025, the UK celebrities taking part were announced alongside confirmation that the show would be aired on Channel 4 in January 2026 as the UK's eighth celebrity series. The series began airing in Australia on 29 April 2026.

Recruit	Celebrity		Known for	Status (Episode Number)
10	(Australia)	Emily Seebohm	Retired Olympic swimmer	Passed (8)
4	(United Kingdom)	Dani Dyer	Reality TV star	Passed (8)
5	(United Kingdom)	Gabby Allen	Love Island contestant	Passed (8)
14	(Australia)	Mack Horton	Retired Olympic swimmer	Voluntarily Withdrawn (8)
7	(United Kingdom)	Ben Cohen	Retired rugby player	Voluntarily Withdrawn (8)
2	(United Kingdom)	Toby Olubi	UK Gladiators star, Phantom	Culled (5)
6	(United Kingdom)	Graeme Swann	Retired cricketer	Medically Withdrawn (5)
12	(Australia)	Ryan Moloney	Neighbours actor	Voluntarily Withdrawn (5)
9	(Australia)	Brad Hodge	Retired cricketer	Voluntarily Withdrawn (4)
1	(United Kingdom)	Cole Anderson-James	YouTuber	Voluntarily Withdrawn (4)
11	(Australia)	Axle Whitehead	Musician	Medically Withdrawn (4)
3	(United Kingdom)	Jack Joseph	Social media personality	Voluntarily Withdrawn (4)
13	(Australia)	Natalie Bassingthwaighte	Actress and singer	Voluntarily Withdrawn (3)
8	(Australia)	Jessika Power	Reality TV star	Voluntarily Withdrawn (2)

=== Australian Ratings ===
No.	Title	Air date	Timeslot	National total viewers	Night rank	Ref(s)
1	Behind Enemy Lines	29 April 2026	Wednesday 7:30 pm	522,000	9	
2	Misfits	6 May 2026	Wednesday 7:30 pm	451,000	10	
3	Composure	13 May 2026	Wednesday 7:30 pm	479,000	10	
4	Breaking Point	20 May 2026	Wednesday 7:30 pm	442,000	13	
5	Family	27 May 2026	Wednesday 7:30 pm	291,000	14	
6	Control	3 June 2026	Wednesday 7:30 pm	390,000	13	

== Civilian edition ==
=== Season 1 (2021) ===
In March 2021, Seven commissioned a miniseries featuring civilian contestants in addition to the second main season. Titled SAS: Hell Week, the mini-season was filmed back to back with the second celebrity season in the Blue Mountains.

==== Ratings ====
No.	Title	Air date	Timeslot	Overnight ratings		Consolidated ratings		Total viewers	Ref(s)
No.	Title	Air date	Timeslot	Viewers	Rank	Viewers	Rank	Total viewers	Ref(s)
1	Without Warning	18 October 2021	Monday 7:30 pm	387,000	18	49,000	18	436,000	
2	The New Normal	19 October 2021	Tuesday 7:30 pm	366,000	16	54,000	14	420,000	
3	Breaking Point	25 October 2021	Monday 7:30 pm	348,000	18	36,000	18	384,000	
4	Beyond Limits	26 October 2021	Tuesday 7:30 pm	328,000	15	36,000	15	364,000	

=== Civilian winners ===
Series	Winners
1	James Fenwick and Sarah Jeavons
