= CelebAbility =

British game show

- Genre: Panel show
- Presented by: Iain Stirling
- Starring: Marek Larwood; Scarlett Moffatt; Stacey Solomon
- Narrated by: Jarred Christmas
- Country of origin: United Kingdom
- Original language: English
- No. of series: 7
- No. of episodes: 52

Production
- Executive producers: Phil Mount; Michael Kelpie; Les Keen; Aaron Morgan; Luke Shiach
- Production locations: The London Studios (2017–18); Elstree Studios (2019–23)
- Running time: 60 minutes (inc. adverts)
- Production company: Potato

Original release
- Network: ITV2
- Release: 15 June 2017 – 27 July 2023

CelebAbility was a British panel show that aired on ITV2 from 15 June 2017 to 27 July 2023 and is presented by Iain Stirling.

== Format ==
CelebAbility featured two teams, one consisting of celebrities and the other, a group of challengers which feature members of the public. The captain of the challengers selects a member of their team to take on a celebrity in a challenge which consists of the celebrity's expert subject. Since 2019, Scarlett Moffatt has served has captain of the challengers team, except the fourth series, which featured Stacey Solomon instead, due to Moffatt having other commitments. The seventh series featured Moffatt, as well as various guest team captains including Katherine Ryan, Will Best, Snoochie Shy and Pete Wicks. Marek Larwood also appears in every episode as the adjudicator.

== Production ==
In May 2017, ITV announced the commissioning of the CelebAbility, a new physical comedy entertainment game show. It is produced by Potato, the same company behind game shows such as The Chase and Ninja Warrior UK. The show is broadcast weekly on ITV2 and airs directly after Love Island.

== Episodes ==
=== Series 1 (2017) ===
Episode	First broadcast	Celebrities
1x01	15 June 2017	Mikey North, Olivia Buckland, Pete Wicks, Rickie Haywood-Williams, Vicky Pattison
1x02	22 June 2017	Ed Gamble, Laura Whitmore, Louis Smith, Sair Khan, Stephanie Pratt
1x03	29 June 2017	Lydia Bright, Luisa Omielan, Jake Quickenden, Matt Richardson, Vogue Williams
1x04	6 July 2017	Keith Duffy, Megan McKenna, Ola Jordan, Stephen Bailey, Will Best
1x05	13 July 2017	AJ Odudu, Ampika Pickston, Jade Jones, Joey Essex, Josh Cuthbert
1x06	20 July 2017	David Morgan, Joe Swash, Laura Norton, Jonnie Peacock, Maya Jama

=== Series 2 (2018) ===
Episode	First broadcast	Celebrities
2x01	20 June 2018	James Argent, Jennifer Metcalfe, Jordan Davies, Marcel Somerville, Paisley Billings
2x02	27 June 2018	Ben Hanlin, Desiree Burch, Ellie Taylor, Georgia Kousoulou, Jamie Laing
2x03	4 July 2018	Adam Gemili, Bobby Norris, Charlotte Crosby, Chris Hughes, Vick Hope
2x04	18 July 2018	Duncan James, Ollie Locke, Olivia Attwood, Scott Mills, Vanessa White
2x05	25 July 2018	Amber Davies, Ashley Roberts, Matthew Wolfenden, Nathan Henry, Perri Shakes-Drayton
2x06	1 August 2018	Jordan Banjo, Lauren Simon, Montana Brown, Sam Thompson, Tom Read Wilson
2x07	8 August 2018	Ferne McCann, Laura Jackson, Perri Kiely, Roman Kemp, Tanya Bardsley
2x08	15 August 2018	AJ Pritchard, CiCi Coleman, Charlotte Dawson, Deano Baily, Melvin Odoom

=== Series 3 (2019) ===
Episode	First broadcast	Celebrities
3x01	5 June 2019	Helen Flanagan, Lee Ryan, Matt Evers, Nathan Caton
3x02	12 June 2019	Alice Perrin, Tommy Mallett, Tez Ilyas, Una Healy
3x03	19 June 2019	Jack Fincham, Natasia Demetriou, Richard Arnold, Yasmin Evans
3x04	26 June 2019	Chris Ramsey, Darren Harriott, David Potts, Lilah Parsons
3x05	3 July 2019	Harriet Kemsley, Lloyd Griffith, Mark-Francis Vandelli, Snoochie Shy
3x06	10 July 2019	Amelia Lily, Arron Crascall, Liam "Gatsby" Blackwell, Luke Kempner
3x07	17 July 2019	Brennan Reece, London Hughes, Samira Mighty, Tom Parker
3x08	24 July 2019	Danielle Armstrong, Lady Leshurr, Suzi Ruffell, Ross Adams

=== Series 4 (2020) ===
Episode	First broadcast	Celebrities	Viewers (millions)
4x01	16 January 2020	Ade Adepitan, Judi Love, Katherine Ryan, Roman Kemp	N/A
4x02	23 January 2020	Helen Bauer, Jack P. Shepherd, Joe Swash, Nikki Sanderson	N/A
4x03	30 January 2020	Baga Chipz, Demi Sims, Ivo Graham, Tom Read Wilson	0.265
4x04	6 February 2020	Chelcee Grimes, Dane Baptiste, Greg Shepherd, Jenny Ryan	N/A
4x05	13 February 2020	Aljaž Škorjanec, Janette Manrara, Jayde Adams, Matt Richardson	N/A
4x06	20 February 2020	Denise van Outen, Katherine Ryan, Kieron Richardson, Lauren Steadman	0.329

=== Series 5 (2021) ===
Episode	First broadcast	Celebrities
5x01	3 June 2021	Katherine Ryan, Megan Barton-Hanson, Melvin Odoom, Sonny Jay
5x02	10 June 2021	Joel Dommett, Kemah Bob, Liam Charles, The Vivienne
5x03	17 June 2021	AJ Odudu, Pete Wicks, Sam Thompson, Stephen Bailey
5x04	24 June 2021	Chris Hughes, Jorgie Porter, Kae Kurd, Suzi Ruffell
5x05	1 July 2021	Barney Walsh, Finn Tapp, Judi Love, Lady Leshurr
5x06	15 July 2021	Chloe Ferry, Joanne McNally, Jordan North, Ore Oduba
5x07	22 July 2021	Donna Preston, Josh Jones, Matt Richardson, Vicky Pattison
5x08	29 July 2021	David Potts, Dianne Buswell, Joey Essex, Sophie Duker

=== Series 6 (2022) ===
Episode	First broadcast	Celebrities	Viewers (millions)
6x01	16 June 2022	Jamie Laing, Josh Jones, Megan McKenna, Melvin Odoom	0.227
6x02	23 June 2022	Eyal Booker, Lou Sanders, Seann Walsh, Sophie Hermann	0.344
6x03	30 June 2022	Amy Childs, Maisie Adam, Arielle Free, Luke Kempner	0.205
6x04	7 July 2022	Rickie Haywood-Williams, Amy Dowden, Janine Harouni, Darren Harriott	0.369
6x05	14 July 2022	Alex George, Maisie Smith, The Vivienne, Dane Baptiste	0.269
6x06	21 July 2022	Sam Thompson, Chelsee Healey, Kiri Pritchard-McLean, Lianne Sanderson	0.280
6x07	28 July 2022	Rachel Riley, James Lock, Amber Gill, Kae Kurd	0.251
6x08	4 August 2022	Verona Rose, Naughty Boy, Shaughna Phillips, Stephen Bailey	N/A

=== Series 7 (2023) ===
Episode	First broadcast	Celebrities	Viewers (millions)
7x01	8 June 2023	Jorgie Porter, Josh Jones, Will Best, Roman Hackett	0.143
7x02	15 June 2023	Amber Turner, Kimberly Wyatt, Seann Walsh, Yasmin Evans	0.153
7x03	22 June 2023	Danielle Harold, Dean McCullough, Kemah Bob, Max George	0.129
7x04	29 June 2023	Indiyah Polack, Katherine Ryan, Luke Kempner, Rickie Haywood-Williams	N/A
7x05	6 July 2023	GK Barry, Janine Harouni, Owen Warner, Tyler West	N/A
7x06	13 July 2023	Donna Preston, Karim Zeroual, Seann Walsh, Tasha Ghouri	0.133
7x07	20 July 2023	Angellica Bell, Bobby Mair, Bobby Norris, Danny Miller	0.170
7x08	27 July 2023	Babatunde Aléshé, Harriet Kemsley, Harry Derbidge, Snoochie Shy	TBA
