= Pete Wicks =

English television personality (born 1988)

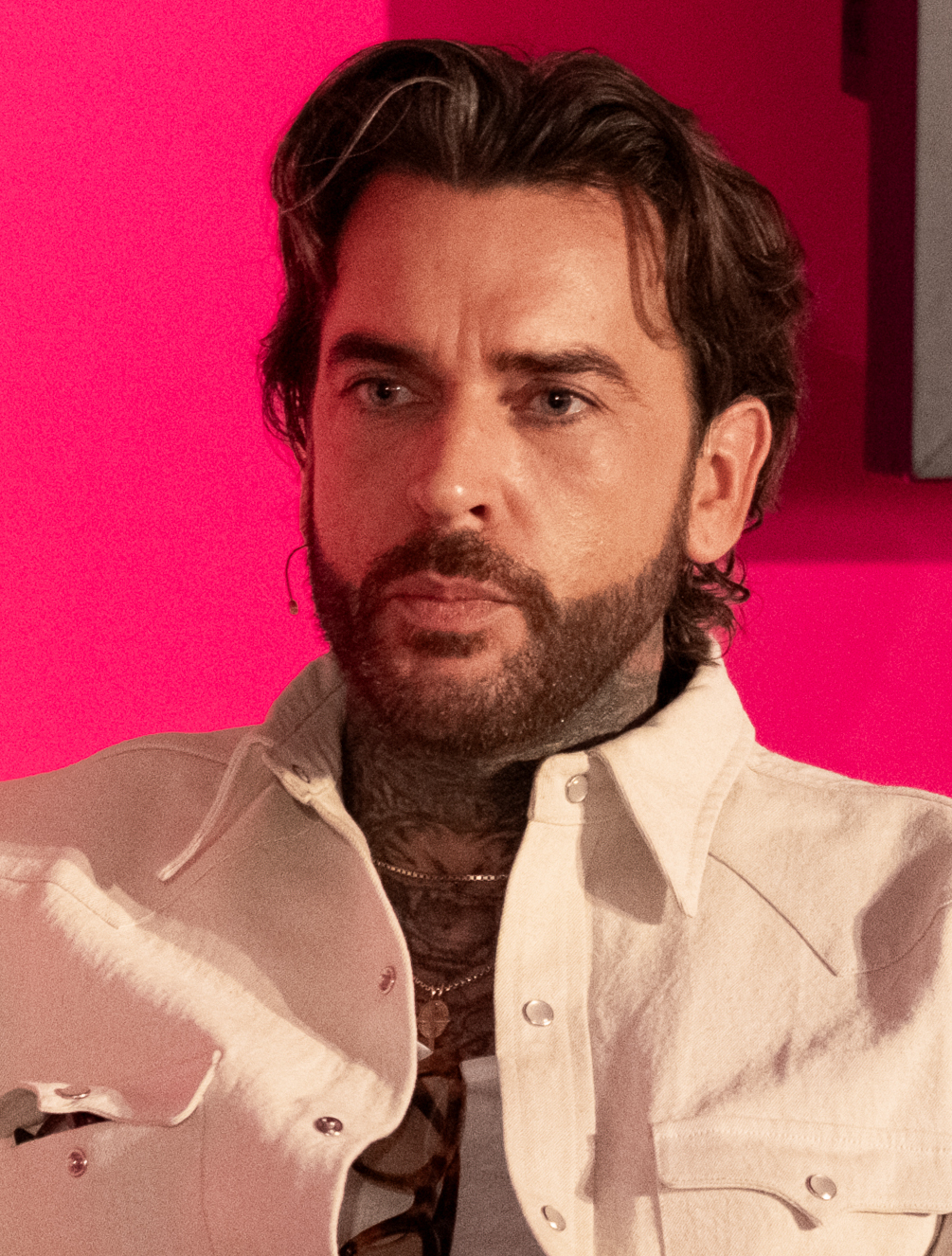
- Wicks in 2026
- Born: Peter James Wicks; 1 November 1988 (age 37); Harlow, Essex, England
- Occupation: Television personality
- Television: The Only Way Is Essex (2015–2022); Celebs Go Dating (2019, 2020, 2022); Celebrity MasterChef (2020); The Celebrity Circle (2021); The Underdog: Josh Must Win (2024); Strictly Come Dancing (2024)

Peter James Wicks (born 1 November 1988) is an English television personality who was a cast member on the ITVBe reality series The Only Way Is Essex. Between September and December 2024, he was a contestant on the twenty-second series of Strictly Come Dancing, partnered with professional dancer Jowita Przystał, who he then dated in 2025. After the breakup at the end of 2025, Pete briefly dated Amber Ward before officially launching his relationship with Olivia Attwood in mid/late 2026.

== Life and career ==
Peter James Wicks was born on 1 November 1988 in Harlow, Essex. In 2015, Wicks joined the cast of The Only Way Is Essex for its fifteenth series. From 2016 to 2017, he was in a relationship with Ex on the Beach star Megan McKenna.

In 2018, Wicks was a contestant on Celebrity Island with Bear Grylls. In 2019, Wicks appeared on the sixth series of Celebs Go Dating. He later returned to the series the following year during the COVID-19 pandemic to appear on Celebs Go Virtual Dating. Later in 2020, Wicks was a contestant on Celebrity MasterChef. In April 2021, Wicks joined The Celebrity Circle alongside his best friend Sam Thompson to play for money for charity by catfishing as Countdown presenter Rachel Riley. They were runners-up of the series. In 2022, Wicks appeared on an episode of Tipping Point: Lucky Stars and appeared on the fourth series of Celebrity SAS: Who Dares Wins. He was medically withdrawn due to injury. He has also made guest appearances on television series including Joe Lycett's Got Your Back, CelebAbility, Sunday Brunch, Celebrity Juice, and Supermarket Sweep. He appeared on Celebs Go Dating for his third time in 2022. In 2023, Wicks participated in the Christmas edition of The Real Full Monty.

Since 2022, Wicks has been co-host of the podcast Staying Relevant with Sam Thompson. A live tour is due to take place in 2024. In June 2025, the podcast won its first award at the annual Television and Radio Industries Club.

Between March and April 2024, Wicks appeared on The Underdog: Josh Must Win, aired on Channel 4 alongside Nick Grimshaw, Vicky Pattinson and Amber Rose Gill. Between September and December 2024, Wicks was a contestant on the twenty-second series of Strictly Come Dancing, partnered with professional dancer Jowita Przystał. and reached the semi-final in week 12.

In 2025, Wicks presented docuseries For Dogs' Sake for U&W, which was filmed at the Dogs Trust rehoming centre in Basildon. He also began co-hosting the KISS radio show The Sunday Roast alongside Olivia Attwood, whom he been dating since 2026.

== Filmography ==
As himself
Year	Title	Notes
2015–2022	The Only Way Is Essex	Series regular
2018	Celebrity Island with Bear Grylls	Contestant
2019, 2022	Celebs Go Dating	Cast member; series 6 & 11
2020	Celebrity MasterChef	Contestant; series 15
2020	Celebs Go Virtual Dating	Virtual; due to COVID-19 pandemic
2021	The Celebrity Circle	Contestant; third place
2022	Celebrity SAS: Who Dares Wins	Contestant; series 4
2023	The Real Full Monty: Jingle Balls	Cast member
2024	Celebrity SAS: Who Dares Wins	Contestant; series 6
2024	The Underdog: Josh Must Win	Panellist
2024	Strictly Come Dancing	Contestant; series 22
2025–	For Dogs' Sake	Docuseries; U&W

== Books ==
- Never Enough: My words unfiltered (September 2024)
- Wicks, Pete (22 February 2018). For the Love of Frenchies: The Dogs that Changed my Life. Random House. ISBN 978-0-7535-4900-1.
