= Peru Two =

British drug traffickers

- Born: Michaella McCollum and Melissa Reid; Northern Ireland and Scotland, respectively
- Known for: Drug smuggling
- Status: Both discharged. McCollum and Reid returned home to the United Kingdom
- Motive: Financial
- Conviction: Yes
- Criminal charges: Smuggling cocaine
- Penalty: 6 years, 8 months' imprisonment (served 2 years, 6 months)

The Peru Two are two women from Ireland and Scotland, Michaella McCollum and Melissa Reid, who were arrested on 6 August 2013 on suspicion of drug smuggling at Jorge Chávez International Airport, Lima, Peru, after their luggage was found to contain 12 kg (26 lb) of cocaine.

They had flown from Ibiza, Spain, where they were on holiday. McCollum was a native of Dungannon, Northern Ireland while Reid was from Lenzie, Scotland. The two initially claimed they had been coerced by an armed gang but subsequently pleaded guilty. On 17 December 2013, the pair were sentenced to six years and eight months' imprisonment. In the Ancón 2 prison, they took up coveted training positions in beauty therapy in a bid to become hair stylists.

In early 2016, both women sought to return to the United Kingdom. McCollum applied to be freed on parole, and was released on 31 March 2016, with the prospect of having to remain in Peru for up to six years. In April, the Peruvian authorities agreed to expel Reid from the country; she was released from prison on 21 June and immediately returned to Britain, arriving at Glasgow airport the following day. McCollum returned to Europe two months later, arriving at Dublin airport in Ireland on 13 August 2016.

The women have received extensive press coverage in Peru, the United Kingdom, Ireland and other countries since their arrest. They were featured on the Channel 4 documentary Brits Behind Bars: Cocaine Smugglers, which aired on 10 October 2015, and detailed how drug mules are trained.

McCollum has written a book about her experiences entitled You'll Never See Daylight Again.

In October 2022, the documentary High: Confessions of an Ibiza Drug Mule, based on Michaella McCollum's experiences, became available for streaming on Netflix. This documentary contains some factual differences and omissions from previous quotes from her book.

In July 2023, ten years after her arrest, McCollum graduated from the University of Ulster with a Bachelor of Business Administration degree in Business Management, Marketing and Related Support Services.

In 2025, McCollum passed selection for Celebrity SAS: Who Dares Wins.
