= Montana Brown =

English television personality (born 1995)

- Born: Montana Rose Brown; 29 August 1995 (age 30); Watford, Hertfordshire, England
- Occupation: Television personality
- Years active: 2017–present
- Known for: Love Island; Celebrity Island with Bear Grylls; Celebrity SAS: Who Dares Wins
- Partner(s): Mark O'Connor (2020–present; engaged)
- Children: 2

Montana Rose Brown (born 29 August 1995) is an English television personality, known for appearing as a contestant on the third series of Love Island in 2017. She also appeared on the third series of Celebrity Island with Bear Grylls in 2018, and Celebrity SAS: Who Dares Wins in 2023.

== Life and career ==
Montana Rose Brown was born on 29 August 1995 in Watford, Hertfordshire. She is of Japanese and Jamaican descent. Prior to appearing on television, she studied economics at the University of Bournemouth. In June 2017, she became a contestant on the third series of the ITV2 reality dating show Love Island. During her time in the villa, she was coupled up with various contestants including Dom Lever, Marcel Somerville, Sam Gowland, Simon Searles and Alex Beattie, the latter of whom she was dumped from the villa alongside on Day 50 of the series. Brown and Beattie dated briefly before splitting shortly after the series finished.

After leaving the villa, Brown presented a fashion segment on This Morning. She also appeared on shows including Loose Women, I'm a Celebrity: Extra Camp, CelebAbility, All-Star Netball for Sport Relief and Celebrity Mastermind. In 2018, she appeared as a contestant on the third series of Celebrity Island with Bear Grylls. She ultimately decided to leave the island after three days due to finding it "too hard". In 2023, Brown appeared as a contestant on the fifth series of Celebrity SAS: Who Dares Wins. She was medically withdrawn from the show during the fifth episode of the series. Brown has been engaged to Mark O'Connor since 2023, after three years of dating. They have a son, born in 2023, and a daughter, born in 2025.

== Filmography ==
As herself
Year	Title	Notes	Ref.
2017	Love Island	Contestant; series 3	
2017	Loose Women	Guest; 1 episode	
2017	I'm a Celebrity: Extra Camp	Guest; 3 episodes	
2018	CelebAbility	Guest; 1 episode	
2018	Celebrity Island with Bear Grylls	Contestant; series 3	
2018	Celebrity Mastermind	Contestant; 1 episode	
2019	All-Star Netball for Sport Relief	Television special	
2017, 2019	This Morning	Guest; 6 episodes	
2020	Greatest Celebrity Wind-Ups Ever	Guest; 1 episode	
2023	Celebrity SAS: Who Dares Wins	Contestant; series 5	
