= Celebrity Island with Bear Grylls =

British reality television show

- Titles cards from the second series
- Starring: Bear Grylls
- Narrated by: Bear Grylls
- Country of origin: United Kingdom
- Original language: English
- No. of series: 3
- No. of episodes: 16

Production
- Executive producer: Rod Williams
- Producer: John Joe Bardsley
- Running time: 60 minutes (inc. adverts)
- Production companies: Shine Television; Bear Grylls Ventures

Original release
- Network: Channel 4
- Release: 18 September 2016 – 7 October 2018

Related
- The Island with Bear Grylls

Celebrity Island with Bear Grylls is a spin-off series of The Island with Bear Grylls. It was first broadcast on Channel 4 as part of a charity campaign for Stand Up to Cancer UK in September 2016. The show has the same format as The Island with Bear Grylls, in which the participants are left on a remote uninhabited Pacific island with only limited water, some basic tools and training and are expected to find their own food, water and shelter. The celebrities, however, stayed on the island for a shorter period of two weeks. A second series began airing on 29 August 2017. The second series saw the celebrities stay on the island for a longer amount of time, four weeks.

It was announced in July 2018 that a third and final series would be produced, and it aired starting on 9 September 2018.

== Series overview ==
Series	Episodes	Originally released	
Series	Episodes	First released	Last released
1	4	18 September 2016	9 October 2016
2	6	29 August 2017	26 September 2017
3	6	9 September 2018	7 October 2018

== Series 1 (2016) ==
At the end of the third series, a celebrity series was confirmed, and was broadcast in September and October 2016 in aid of Cancer Research UK's Stand Up to Cancer campaign. The first series consisted of four 60 minutes episodes. The series saw 10 celebrities live on the island for two weeks. Aston Merrygold could not cope with living on the island and left in the first episode, while Thom Evans left the following after finding the lack of food difficult.

=== Celebrities ===
The ten celebrities participating on the series were:

Name	Known for
Aston Merrygold (walked)	Former JLS singer
Dr. Dawn Harper	Presenter of Embarrassing Bodies
Dom Joly	Comedian & star of Trigger Happy TV
Josie Long	Stand up comedian & presenter
Karen Danczuk	Television personality
Lydia Bright	The Only Way Is Essex personality
Mark Jenkins	of The Hotel
Ollie Locke	Former Made in Chelsea personality
Thom Evans (walked)	Former rugby Player & model
Zöe Salmon	Former Blue Peter presenter

== Series 2 (2017) ==
It was confirmed on This Morning on ITV that a second series of Celebrity Island with Bear Grylls would be produced. The second series started airing on 29 August 2017 on Channel 4. The second series is longer with the celebrities staying on the island for 4 weeks, 2 weeks more than series one.

In the second episode, RJ Mitte decided to leave after the safety team arrived to help the group cope with torrential rain. Mitte was unhappy with the disorganisation of the group, suggesting that the other participants would be "eaten" within days had the survival situation been "real". Both Sharron Davies and Jordan Stephens left in the following episode unable to cope with the conditions on the island. Mark Watson left after suffering from severe chest pains and insomnia in the final episode, and claimed after the show that he almost died and that his stay on the island had left him in a poor state.

=== Celebrities ===
Name	Known for
Iwan Thomas	The One Show reporter & retired sprinter
Jordan Stephens (walked)	Rizzle Kicks member
Lucy Mecklenburgh	Model & former The Only Way Is Essex personality
Mark Watson (walked)	Comedian & author
Melody Thornton	Former The Pussycat Dolls singer
RJ Mitte (walked)	Actor & former Breaking Bad actor
Ryan Thomas	Former Coronation Street actor
Dr. Sara Kayat	This Morning doctor
Sharron Davies (walked)	Retired swimmer
Shazia Mirza	Stand-up comedian

== Series 3 (2018) ==
It was confirmed on This Morning on ITV that a third series of Celebrity Island with Bear Grylls would be produced. The series was also now not part of Stand Up to Cancer, but a standalone series. Roxanne Pallett left in the first episode (day 5) after a panic attack due to smoke from the camp fire that reminded her of a childhood house fire. Next to leave was Paris Lees after she was criticised for her effort on the island as well as conflict with Eric Roberts. Montana Brown then left not being able to cope, criticising Bear Grylls and other participants. The rest stayed until the end, although Pete Wicks refused to allow his fellow participants to eat a pig, and he was bitten on his finger by a nurse shark he had caught in his net.

=== Celebrities ===
Name	Known for
Anthony Ogogo	Former professional boxer
Eric Roberts	Actor
James Cracknell	Olympic rower
Jo Wood	Model & ex-wife of Ronnie Wood
Martin Kemp	Former EastEnders actor & Spandau Ballet bassist
Montana Brown (walked)	Former Love Island personality
Paris Lees (walked)	Journalist
Pete Wicks	The Only Way Is Essex personality
Roxanne Pallett (walked)	Former Emmerdale actress
Saleyha Ahsan	Doctor & journalist

== Episodes ==
All figures are the total including +1.

=== Series 1 (2016) ===
No. overall	No. in series	Title	Original release date	UK viewers (millions)
1	1	Episode 1	18 September 2016	3.16
2	2	Episode 2	25 September 2016	2.98
3	3	Episode 3	2 October 2016	2.55
4	4	Episode 4	9 October 2016	2.74

=== Series 2 (2017) ===
No. overall	No. in series	Title	Original release date	UK viewers (millions)
5	1	Episode 1	29 August 2017	2.66
6	2	Episode 2	5 September 2017	2.50
7	3	Episode 3	12 September 2017	2.49
8	4	Episode 4	19 September 2017	2.29
9	5	Episode 5	26 September 2017	2.35
10	6	Surviving the Island	26 September 2017	1.13

=== Series 3 (2018) ===
No. overall	No. in series	Title	Original release date	UK viewers (millions)
11	1	Episode 1: Arrival	9 September 2018	2.59
12	2	Episode 2: Conflict and Storms	16 September 2018	2.47
13	3	Episode 3: Meat or Fish?	23 September 2018	2.21
14	4	Episode 4: Hunger & a Pig	30 September 2018	2.21
15	5	Episode 5: The End	7 October 2018	2.47
16	6	Episode 6: Surviving The Island	7 October 2018	N/A
