= Apocalypse Man =

Apocalypse Man is an American television series that premiered on January 6, 2010 on the History Channel. Hosted by U.S. Marine and martial artist Rudy Reyes, the show is based on how to survive the aftermath of the end of the world.

== Format ==
Reyes demonstrates various techniques for surviving interesting post-apocalyptic scenarios. In the pilot, Reyes uses a bike pump to siphon diesel fuel to power a hospital's generator, creates a makeshift grappling hook to scale over a part-way raised bridge, demonstrates how to create fire with a battery and steel wool, and shows the proper technique to break down a door in a breaching siege. The pilot was filmed in Detroit.
