= Inside the Real Narcos =

- Genre: Documentary
- Starring: Jason Fox
- Country of origin: United States
- Original language: English
- No. of seasons: 1
- No. of episodes: 3

Production
- Running time: 45-46 min.

Original release
- Network: Netflix
- Release: December 14, 2018

Inside the Real Narcos is a television documentary series starring the former member of the British Special Forces Jason Fox. It follows the real narcos performing drug trade in Mexico, Colombia and Peru.

== Premise ==
Inside the Real Narcos stars the former member of the British Special Forces Jason Fox, and follows real narcos performing the drug trade in Mexico, Colombia and Peru, and interviewing members of the drug trade in Latin America.

== Cast ==
- Jason Fox

== Release ==
It was released on December 14, 2018 on Netflix streaming.
