= Jason Fox =

British television personality

- Born: Jason Carl Fox; 31 August 1976 (age 50); Plymouth, England
- Other name: Sheppo
- Occupations: Television personality; Adventurer; Mental health advocate; Soldier
- Years active: 2015–present
- Known for: SAS: Who Dares Wins, Inside the Real Narcos
- Military career
- Allegiance: United Kingdom
- Branch: Royal Marines (1992–2001); Special Boat Service (2001–2012)
- Service years: 20
- Rank: Sergeant

Jason Carl Fox (born 31 August 1976), often referred to by his nickname 'Foxy', is a British television personality, adventurer and a former Royal Marine Commando and UK Special Forces soldier. He is best known as the longest serving Directing Staff (DS) member on the Channel 4 television series SAS: Who Dares Wins and its international adaptations since its first series, and as the presenter of the investigative documentary series Meet the Drug Lords: Inside the Real Narcos.

== Career ==
=== Military service ===
Fox joined the Royal Marines Commandos in 1992 at the age of 16. In 2001, he joined the Special Boat Service and reached the rank of Sergeant. After 20 years of military service, Fox was medically discharged on 5 April 2012 having been diagnosed with post-traumatic stress disorder (PTSD).

=== Television ===
Fox is one of the original presenters and directing staff on SAS: Who Dares Wins, a reality television programme where contestants experience a gruelling training course loosely based on a condensed version of the special forces selection process. Fox initially starred alongside fellow former special forces soldiers Ant Middleton, Matthew 'Ollie' Ollerton, and Colin MacLachlan. His subsequent co-presenters have included Melvyn Downes, Jay Morton, Anthony Stazicker, and Mark 'Billy' Billingham, as well as American special forces veterans Rudy Reyes and Remi Adeleke. The programme first broadcast in 2015 is produced by Channel 4, and aired its fifth season in February 2020. In 2019, the first season of Celebrity SAS: Who Dares Wins aired which also stars Fox. In winter 2023, the concept was adapted for the United States television market as Special Forces: World's Toughest Test, with Fox returning once again.

In 2018, Fox presented a three-part docuseries, Meet the Drug Lords: Inside the real Narcos. He spent time in Mexico, Colombia and Peru, talking to people in, or affected by, drug cartels. Fox's interviews in the series included Popeye (Jhon Jairo Velásquez) – one of Pablo Escobar's Colombian hitmen.

In 2019, Fox presented the documentary The Final Mission: Foxy's War which saw him return to Afghanistan where he had served in the military.

In January 2026, Fox was featured in Arctic Adventure: Ultimate Survival; a Channel 4 documentary in which he joins a group of military veterans taking on a 500KM ultra marathon in Swedish Lapland. In April 2026 he parodied SAS: Who Dares Wins in a fake programme SOS for Celebrity Sabotage on itv.

=== Publications and other media ===
In 2017, Fox co-authored the book SAS: Who Dares Wins: Leadership Secrets from the Special Forces, with his fellow TV presenters and Special Forces soldiers Anthony Middleton, Matthew "Ollie" Ollerton and Colin Maclachlan. The book triggered an investigation by the British Ministry of Defence for alleged admissions of war crimes by the authors.

In 2019, he released an autobiography, Battle Scars, in which he discussed his military career and struggle with mental health issues following his discharge from the Royal Marines in 2012, after he was diagnosed with PTSD. The book became a Sunday Times best-seller.

His second book Life Under Fire: How to Build Inner Strength and Thrive Under Pressure was released October 15, 2020.

Fox became the host of the podcast Jason Fox Wild Tales in 2018, in conjunction with the Book of Man, with whom he is a regular columnist. In each episode, Fox interviews people who have experienced a variety of adventures in their life, touching on their background, and the mental and physical challenges they have faced.

=== Other ===
Since leaving the military, Fox has had several public appearances talking about mental health, and is involved in supporting several charities. Fox is a co-founder of Rock2Recovery with fellow ex royal marine Jamie Sanderson. The pair set it up to assist returning servicemen, veterans and their families.

Outside of his military career, some of Fox's bigger adventures include rowing across the Atlantic Ocean from Lagos, Portugal to Macuro, Venezuela in 2016 with four of his friends including Oliver Bailey. Known as Team Essence, their expedition took the crew 50 days over 3,308 nautical miles, and landed them a record for becoming the first team to row unsupported, crossing the Atlantic Ocean from east to west - from mainland Europe to South America, non-stop from mainland to mainland. Across the journey, Team Essence also raised money for the NSPCC.

In April 2018, a team of ten adventurers, including Fox, embarked on an expedition to the North Pole. They made this journey in aid of the charity Borne to raise awareness of premature birth, and also raised £750,000 for new research into its prevention.

In 2019, Fox alongside Sean Johnson kayaked the length of the Yukon river over 1,980 miles in Alaska. The adventure started with a 49-mile hike from Skagway to Lake Bennet, where the kayak journey stretched from Lake Bennett to the Bering Sea, across 48 days. The expedition was unsupported, with Johnson and Fox raising awareness and funds for Royal Navy and Royal Marines Charity.

Fox, with his co-star of SAS: Who Dares Wins, Matthew "Ollie" Ollerton, co-founded a corporate team building, training and events company. In 2019, Fox and Ollerton went on to launch the fitness and wellbeing app Battle Ready 360 – which focuses on personalised plans for individuals looking to balance mind, body and nutrition.

Fox is also an ambassador of Veterans 4 Wildlife, which campaigns against wildlife crime.
