= Erik M. Jorgensen =

American biologist

Erik M. Jorgensen is an American biologist, currently teaching and running a microbiology and genetics lab at the University of Utah. He is a Distinguished Professor. He has been a Howard Hughes Medical Institute Investigator since 2005.
