= Yasmin Evans =

British radio and television presenter

- Born: 27 October 1990 (age 36); Stockport, Greater Manchester, England
- Education: University of Salford
- Occupation: Radio presenter · Television presenter
- Years active: 2010s–present
- Known for: Presenting on BBC Radio 1Xtra
- Television: Saturday Mash-Up!, Celebrity SAS: Who Dares Wins, BRITs

Yasmin Evans (born 27 October 1990) is an English television and radio presenter. She is best known for presenting on BBC Radio 1Xtra (2012–2021). She's also known for presenting on CBBC's Saturday Mash-Up! (2017–2019), Heart Radio (from 2022) and more.

== Early life and education ==
Evans was born in Stockport, an area of Greater Manchester. She began her radio career at the age of just 15 presenting on one of Manchester's most prominent community stations: All Fm 96.9 www.allfm.org. She studied Radio BA (Hons) at the University of Salford where she was approached by the BBC to take part in their piloting scheme.

== Career ==
In September 2012 Evans was offered the BBC Radio 1Xtra Weekend Breakfast show and after just nine months in that slot she became the co-host of the 1Xtra Weekday Breakfast Show which she presented for three years alongside Twin B. In 2016, she moved to weekday afternoons and swapped timeslots with Dotty.

In Summer 2017, it was announced that Evans and Jonny Nelson would be presenting CBBC's Saturday Mash-Up!. Saturday Mash-Up is a mix of celebrity guests, games, sketches and CBBC shows and it is recorded in MediaCityUK in Salford. Evans and Nelson hosted two series between 2017 and 2019 before they were replaced by Harpz Kaur of BBC Asian Network and YouTuber Joe Tasker.

In 2018, Evans presented The Brit Awards' first International Live Stream in 2018. She also presented in 2019 and 2020.

In 2020, Evans appeared in Channel 4's Celebrity SAS: Who Dares Wins. The programme was aired in April 2020 in the middle of the coronavirus lockdown.

In December 2021, Evans announced that she would be leaving 1Xtra after spending her nine years on the station. Her last show was on Christmas Eve 2021. It was also announced that she will join Heart from the beginning of 2022.

== Personal life ==
In May 2022 it was reported that Evans had been the victim of an assault; Evans posted on her Instagram account that she had been grabbed, punched and knocked out twice while walking near to Liverpool Street station in Bishopsgate.
