= Ant Middleton =

English television personality (born 1980)

- Born: Anthony Middleton; 22 September 1980 (age 46); Portsmouth, Hampshire, England
- Occupations: Political personality; television personality; former special forces soldier
- Years active: 2015–present
- Criminal charges: Unlawful wounding; common assault
- Criminal penalty: 14 months' imprisonment; served 4 months
- Criminal status: Released in 2013
- Spouse: Emilie Middleton
- Children: 5
- Military career
- Allegiance: United Kingdom
- Branch: British Army (1998–2002); Royal Marines (2005–2008); Special Boat Service (2008–2012)
- Rank: Corporal
- Units: 9 Parachute Squadron Royal Engineers; 40 Commando; Special Boat Service
- Conflicts: Operation Banner (1 tour); Operation Essential Harvest; War in Afghanistan (3 tours)
- Website: antmiddleton.com

Anthony Middleton (born 22 September 1980) is a British political and television personality, former UK Special Forces soldier, Royal Marines Commando, and Royal Engineer in the British Army. He is best known as the former chief instructor on the Channel 4 television series SAS: Who Dares Wins, a role he held from 2015 until 2021. Middleton also appeared as the captain in the adventure/reality-show Mutiny and the survival show Escape. In 2018, he climbed Mount Everest for the TV show Extreme Everest with Ant Middleton. Middleton lives in Dubai.

== Early life ==
Middleton was born in Portsmouth, Hampshire, England. In his youth Middleton's family moved from Portsmouth to the Norman village of Saint-Lô in Northern France following the death of his father. In France Middleton attended a local Catholic school and became fluent in French. Middleton has said that France is "a great place to grow up and grow old".

== Career ==
=== Military service and security roles ===
Middleton joined the army in 1998 at the age of 17 where he served in 9 Parachute Squadron Royal Engineers and served tours of duty in Northern Ireland in 1999 during Operation Banner, and in the Republic of North Macedonia in 2001 during Operation Essential Harvest.

After leaving the army in 2002, he later enlisted in the Royal Marines on 2 May 2005. He passed the 32 week commando course on 20 January 2006 with 898 troop, winning the King's Badge for best all-round recruit, and was posted to D Company, 40 Commando. In 2007 he did his first tour in Afghanistan.

In 2008 he joined the Special Boat Service, serving for four years as a point man and as a sniper, in two further tours of Afghanistan.

After leaving the armed forces, Middleton worked as a security guard for VIPs, and later as a security expert in South Africa and for various west African governments.

In November 2019, Middleton was appointed as chief cadet and honorary captain in the Royal Navy's Volunteer Cadet Corps. He left the position nine months later amidst controversy surrounding a comment he made on Twitter, which appeared to compare Black Lives Matter protesters with the English Defence League as extremists and "scum", though he clarified that he was not equating the two groups.

=== Television ===
Middleton was the chief instructor on SAS: Who Dares Wins, a reality high-fitness television programme simulating realistic special forces-type military training and produced by Minnow Films for Channel 4, which was first broadcast in 2015. The show propelled Middleton into the celebrity limelight.

Mutiny, an adventure/reality crossover show, was screened on UK television in February 2017, with Middleton starring as boat captain alongside eight volunteer participants. The show was a re-enactment of the Mutiny on the Bounty and Middleton described the experience as "mentally speaking, the hardest thing I've ever done". In March 2021, Middleton was dropped by Channel 4 over the channel's objections to his personal conduct.

Middleton then repeated his SAS hosting position on the Australian version of the show for the Seven Network.

Additionally, he was the host of the reality adventure show Million Dollar Island, also for Seven.

Middleton and his brother Dan were announced as contestants for a Celebrity Edition of The Amazing Race Australia in March 2025 for Network 10. However, on 18 April 2025, the Herald Sun reported that Ant and Dan were removed following an off-camera verbal altercation with another team after filming of the first episode. According to the tabloid, Dan Middleton made remarks and gestures that were homophobic, offensive, intimidatory and disturbing towards social media personalities and brothers, Luke and "Sassy" Scott O'Halloran following a night out during a break in between filming episodes. A representative for Network 10 stated, "Following a breach of the production's code of conduct by one contestant, on a day off during production, a team from The Amazing Race Australia was disqualified and swiftly sent home."

=== Publications ===
In 2017, Middleton co-authored his first book, SAS: Who Dares Wins: Leadership Secrets from the Special Forces, with his fellow TV presenters and Special Forces colleagues Jason Fox, Matthew "Ollie" Ollerton and Colin Maclachlan. Middleton's autobiography, First Man In: Leading from the Front, was published in 2018, becoming a number 1 Sunday Times best-seller. His second book, The Fear Bubble: Harness Fear and Live Without Limits, was published in 2019, and was also number 1 on The Sunday Times bestseller chart. His third book, Zero Negativity, was published in 2020. Middleton features in coach Mike Chadwick's audiobook The Red On Revolution, published in 2022.

=== Climbing ===
On 14 May 2018, Middleton reached the summit of Mount Everest with Ed Wardle, completing the ascent over a five and a half week period. The pair almost perished when they were caught in a blizzard behind a group of 10 climbers who hampered their progress during the descent.

In 2023, Middleton climbed to the summit of K2, second highest in the world after Everest.

=== Politics ===
On 20 September 2024, Middleton gave his support to Reform UK and he spoke at the party's conference in Birmingham.

On 8 January 2025, Middleton hinted on X (formerly Twitter) that he would run for Mayor of London for Reform UK in 2028, stating "My country is calling me once again! I've fought for it once and I WILL come back and serve it again! Standby, standby...".

On 20 January 2025, Middleton was part of Reform UK's delegation to the second inauguration of Donald Trump in Washington, D.C., in the United States, along with leader Nigel Farage and party treasurer Nick Candy.

On 13 September 2025, Middleton took part in the far-right 'Unite the Kingdom' rally in London. He was a speaker at the rally announcing his intention to run for mayor of London as an independent in 2028. He led the march near Waterloo station alongside Tommy Robinson and fellow TV personalities Katie Hopkins and Laurence Fox. He appeared at a repeat of the rally alongside the same two personalities in May 2026.

He spoke on video in support of the Reform UK candidate in the 2026 Makerfield by-election, which The Guardian reported included saying "You can’t be a Muslim and be in charge of a Christian nation/city" and that "1st, 2nd & 3rd generation immigrants should not hold top-tier government positions".

== Legal issues ==
Middleton was convicted of the unlawful wounding of a male police officer and the common assault of a female police officer in a nightclub in Chelmsford, Essex in 2013, the year he left the Special Boat Service. He described the incident as being "alcohol-fuelled", saying "Once I realised what I’d done, I thought, 'Oh my God'". He gave himself up to the police after a short initial search. He was sentenced to 14 months in prison, of which he served four months.

In March 2025, the Insolvency Service announced that Middleton and his wife had been banned from being company directors for four years following the failure of his company to pay over £1 million in tax. The Insolvency Service said £385,000 in VAT and £869,000 in corporation tax was owed on £4.5 million in income of the company between 2019 and 2022.

In October 2025, the Ministry of Defence filed legal action against Middleton in the High Court alleging breach of contract. The Sun newspaper reported that the alleged breach was linked to social media posts about Middleton’s experience in the special forces.

== Filmography ==
=== Television ===
| Year | Television series | Role | Channel | Notes | Ref |
|---|---|---|---|---|---|
| 2015–2021 | SAS: Who Dares Wins | Chief Instructor | Channel 4 | 6 series | |
| 2017 | Mutiny | Captain Bligh | Channel 4 | 1 series | |
| 2017 | Escape | Himself | Channel 4 | 1 series | |
| 2018 | Extreme Everest with Ant Middleton | Himself | Channel 4 | 1 Series | |
| 2019–2021 | Celebrity SAS: Who Dares Wins | Chief Instructor | Channel 4 | 3 series | |
| 2019 | Ant Middleton and Liam Payne: Straight Talking | Presenter | Sky One | One episode | |
| 2020–present | SAS Australia: Who Dares Wins | Chief Instructor | Seven Network | 4 series | |
| 2021 | Ant Middleton & Rebel Wilson: Straight Talking | Presenter | Sky One | One episode | |
| 2023–present | Million Dollar Island | Presenter | Seven Network | 1 series | |
| 2024 | Dancing with the Stars Australia | Contestant | Seven Network | 1 series | |
| 2024 | Killer K2 | Himself | 7plus | Documentary | |
| 2025 | The Amazing Race Australia 9 | Himself | Network 10 | 1 episode | |

=== Live Tours ===
| Year | Title | Notes | Shows |
|---|---|---|---|
| 2018 | An Evening with Ant Middleton | | 44 shows |
| 2019 | Mind Over Muscle | —N/a | 31 UK shows |
| 2021 | Zero Negativity | | 27 UK shows |
| 2020–2021 | Mind Over Muscle - Aus/ Nz Tour | —N/a | 7 shows |
| 2025 | The Trilogy Tour | Fireside Chat | Australia |
| 2025 | The Emotions of Man | postponed from 2024 | UK (TBC) |

== Works ==
=== Non-fiction ===
- SAS: Who Dares Wins: Leadership Secrets from the Special Forces (Headline, 2016) ISBN 978-1472240736
- Leader et soldat d'élite: Leçons des forces spéciales (Talent Editions, 2019) ISBN 978-2378150587
- Mental Fitness: 15 Rules to Strengthen Your Body and Mind (HarperCollins, 2021) ISBN 978-0008472276
- Mission: Total Resilence (Red Shed, 2022) ISBN 9780755503810
- The Wall (HarperCollins, 2022) ISBN 978-0008472351
- Mission: Total Confidence (Red Shed, 2023) ISBN 9780755503803
- Military Mindset: Lessons from the Battlefield (Hodder and Stoughton/Hachette, October 2024) ISBN 9781399737005

==== The Mindset Trilogy ====
- First Man In: Leading from the Front (HarperCollins, 2018) ISBN 978-0008245719
- The Fear Bubble: Harness Fear and Live Without Limits (HarperCollins, 2019) ISBN 978-0008194680
- Zero Negativity: The Power of Positive Thinking (HarperCollins, 2020) ISBN 978-0008336516

=== Fiction ===
- Cold Justice (Sphere, 2021) ISBN 978-0751580433
- Red Mist (Sphere, 2023) ISBN 978-0751580471

== Medals ==

| Ribbon | Description | Notes |
|---|---|---|
| | General Service Medal | With "NORTHERN IRELAND" Clasp |
| | NATO Medal for Macedonia | |
| | Operational Service Medal for Afghanistan | With "AFGHANISTAN" Clasp |
| | Queen Elizabeth II Diamond Jubilee Medal | 2012; UK version of this medal |
