= Cole Anderson-James =

British YouTuber (born 1997)

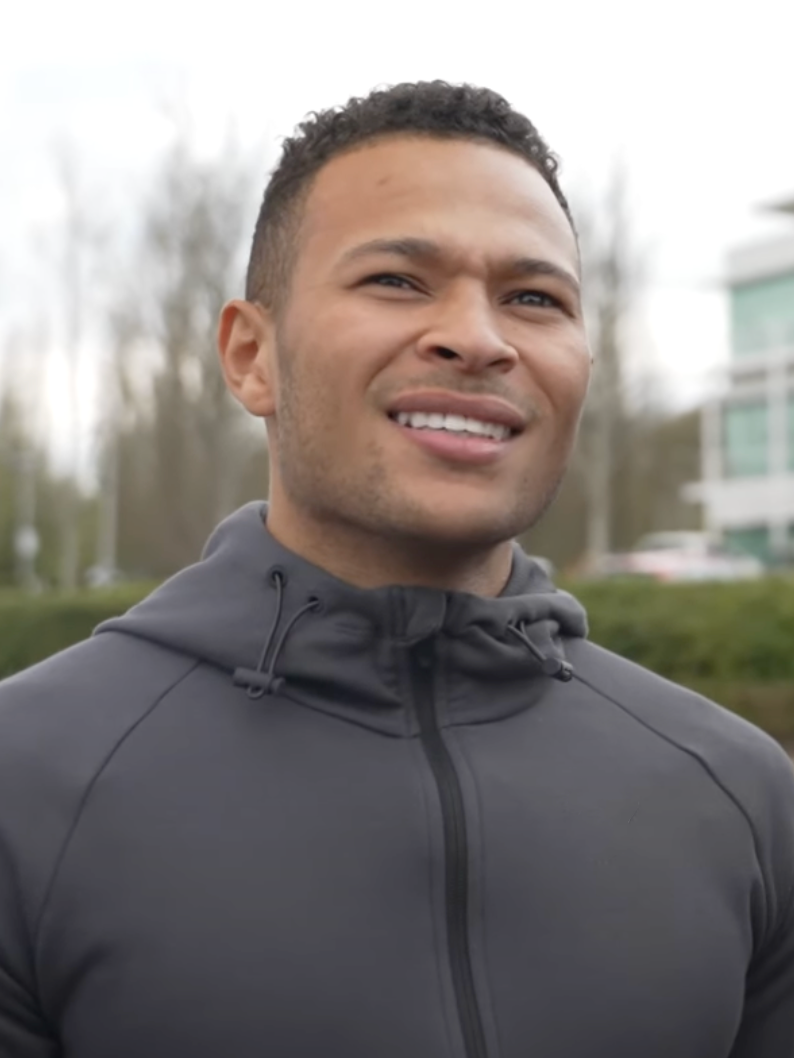
- Anderson-James in 2022
- Born: 10 May 1997 (age 29); Colchester, England
- Occupation: YouTuber
- Years active: 2010–present

TikTok information
- Page: Cole Anderson James
- Followers: 2.9 million
- Last updated: 2 January 2026

Cole Anderson-James (born 10 May 1997) is a British YouTuber, social media personality, and actor.

== Early life ==
Cole Anderson-James was born and raised in Colchester, England. Before achieving internet notability and starting a career as an actor, he was working in sales; "I got made redundant and it was probably one of the best things that has actually happened to me because I had way more time to spend doing the videos".

== Career ==
=== 2020-present ===
During the 2020 COVID-19 lockdowns in the United Kingdom, Anderson-James began releasing videos on TikTok and YouTube of himself lip-synching to Ricky Gervais' The Office character David Brent. He was soon spotted by Gervais, who followed Anderson-James on Twitter. In 2021, after directly contacting Gervais, asking if there were any cameo roles available on the third (and final) series of After Life, Gervais created a guest role for Anderson-James. "On the premise you don't ask, you don't get, [...] months went past and I didn't hear anything. I thought 'it's not happening', and then I got an email saying 'audition for After Life [season] 3' and my head exploded." Anderson-James' videos also caught the attention of Emily Atack, who cast him in her eponymously titled comedy series, as her love-interest "Fit Jason".

Later in 2022, Anderson-James appeared as Darren in the BBC comedy Murder, They Hope, alongside Johnny Vegas and Sian Gibson.

In December 2025, it was announced that Anderson-James would compete in the eighth series of Celebrity SAS: Who Dares Wins. The series premiered on Channel 4 in January 2026.

== Personal life ==
=== Legal issues ===
In October 2025, Anderson-James was fined more than £1,000 and disqualified from driving for eight months, after he was caught speeding in April 2025; he admitted the offence.

== Filmography ==
=== Film ===
Year	Title	Role	Notes
2011	Mercenaries	Deano	

=== Television ===
Year	Title	Role	Notes
2010	The Big I Am	Stinger	Uncredited
2016	The Contract	Simon	Uncredited
2020-2021	The Emily Atack Show	Fit Jason	8 episodes
2022	After Life	Yoga instructor	Series 3 episode 6
2022	Murder, They Hope	Darren	Series 2 episode 1: Can't See The Blood For The Trees
2022	At The End Of The Day (It's Not That Funny)	Shop keeper	Video
2026	Celebrity SAS: Who Dares Wins	Contestant	Series 8
