= Erik Jørgensen (brand) =

Danish furniture company

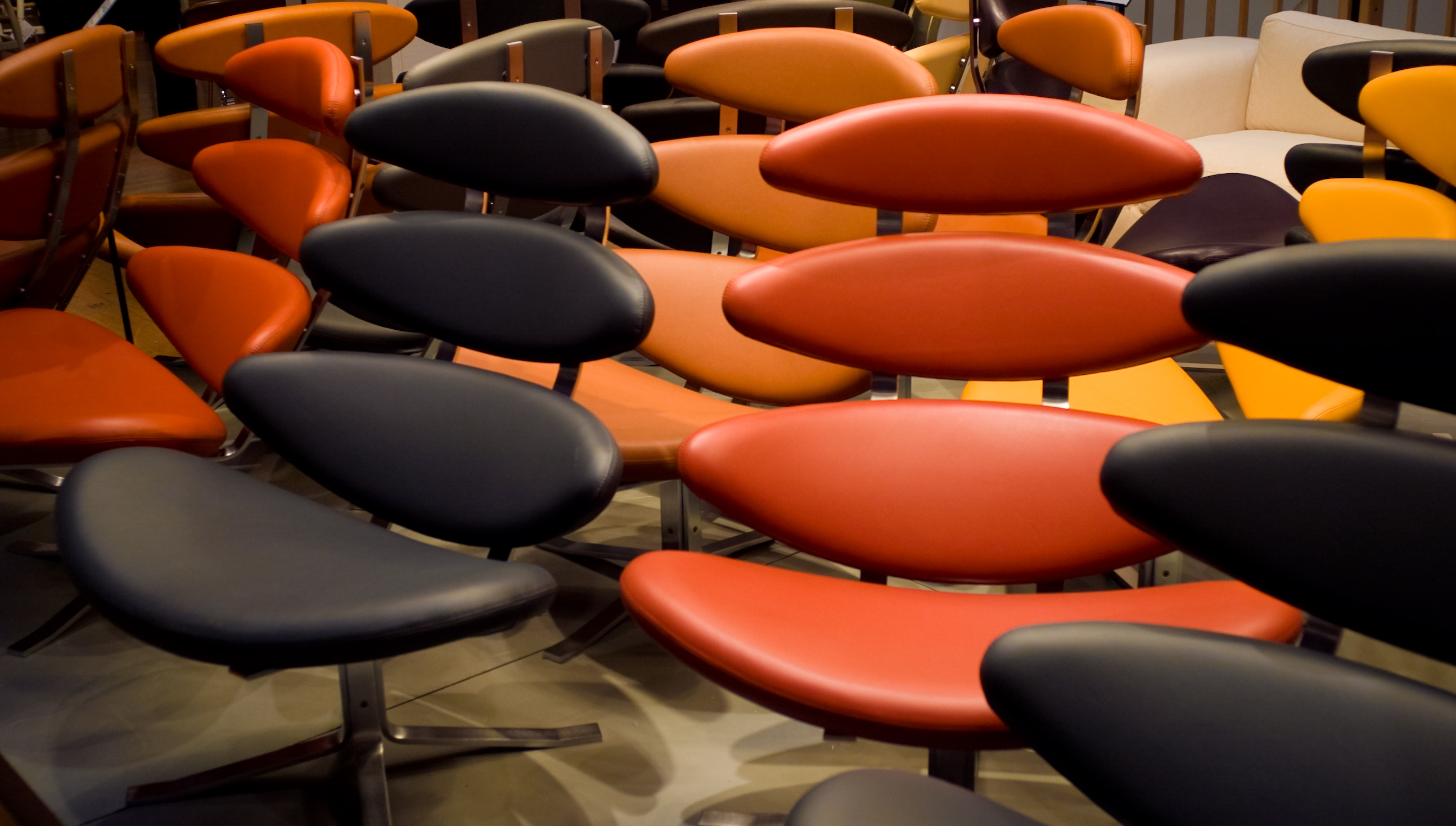
Corona chairs

Erik Jørgensen is a Danish furniture company. It has its own design team and also works with external designers.

== History ==
Erik Jørgensen founded his company as a small workshop in Svendborg in 1954. Within a few years, the company developed into a reputable furniture upholstering company.

== Designers ==
- Foersom and Hiort-Lorenzen
- Louise Campbell
- Poul M. Volther
- Anne-Mette Jensen and Morten Ernst
- Niels Gammelgaard
- Hans Wegner
- David Lewis
- Erik Ole Jørgensen
- Jørgen Gammelgaard
- Tine Mouritsen and Mia Sinding
- Hannes Wettstein

== Furniture ==
- Ox chair (Wegner)
- Corona chair (Volther)
- In Duplo sofa (Jensen & Ernst)

== Awards ==
- Wallpaper Design Award (sofa category) for *In Duplo sofa
