= Battle of Ramadi (2004) =

Battle in 2004 as part of the Iraq War

- Part of the Iraq War
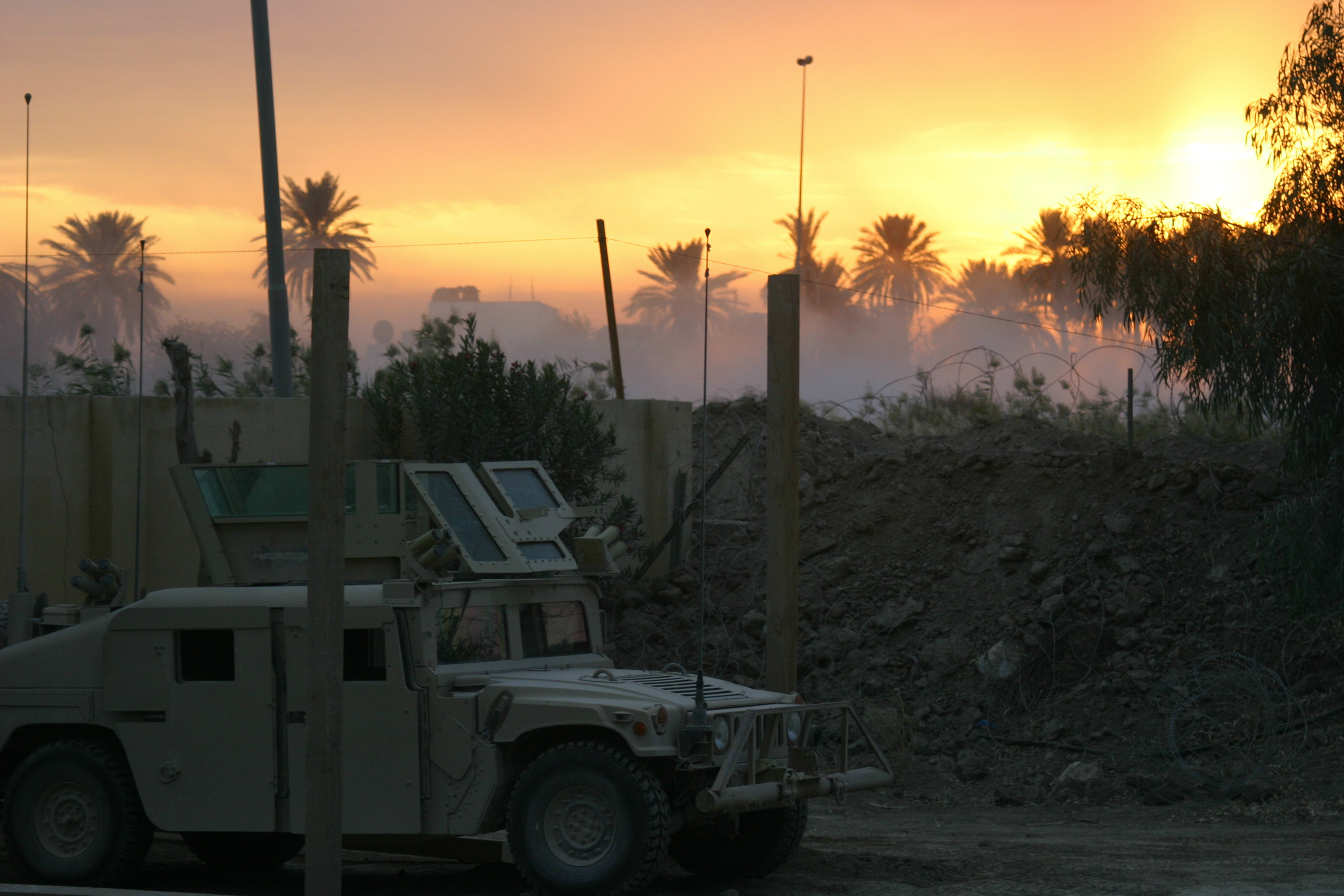
Date	April 6–10, 2004 (4 days)
Location	Ramadi, Iraq 33°21′N 43°47′E
Result	U.S. victory

Belligerents
United States	Jama'at al-Tawhid wal-Jihad; Islamic Army in Iraq 1920 Revolution Brigades Ansar al-Sunnah

Commanders and leaders
(United States) Paul Kennedy; (United States) Robert Weiler; (United States) Christopher J. Bronzi; (United States) John S. Anthony	Unknown

Units involved
2nd Battalion, 4th Marines, NMCB 14, Navy Seabees	Unknown

Strength
1,800 troops	1,000 insurgents

Casualties and losses
34 killed 269 wounded	250 killed

The Battle of Ramadi was fought in the spring of 2004, during the same time as the First Battle of Fallujah, for control of the capital of the Al Anbar Governorate in western Iraq. A coalition military force consisting of the 2nd Battalion, 4th Marines were stationed to defend the city from an insurgent assault.

In April 2004, Fallujah was under siege by Coalition Forces and insurgents were looking to relieve pressure on the city by attempting an offensive of their own. Ramadi, the capital of Al Anbar Province, was seen as a center of gravity to coalition forces, and thus a critical city in western Iraq.

Before the battle started, insurgents cut off the highway out of Al Anbar to Baghdad.

On April 6, 2004, Marines fought with insurgents throughout the city in running gun battles that day. At the end of the first day of fighting, 12 Marines had been killed in action. The following day fighting continued. Over the course of a four-day period, 250 insurgents were killed.

After six months of fighting in Ramadi, 34 Marines and a Navy corpsman had been KIA, and 269 Marines had been wounded. The city remained an unstable environment throughout the course of the 2000s which led to the subsequent battle in 2006. Five NMCB Seabees were killed in action and 31 were wounded.

== Battle ==
=== April 4th ===
Beginning at 10:48, Company G received small arms and RPG fire in the al-Maab District. The insurgents were pursued to a nearby building where two squads and a quick reaction force continued fighting from 11:45 to 12:05. From there the squads were pinned down and the quick reaction force move to a support position where they were engaged one block east of Company G's position. Captain Christopher J. Bronzi, commander of the company, led his Marines in 24 hours of action. At one point he led a team onto the street to recover the body of a fallen Marine.

At approximately 13:30, an explosives device was reported in Company E’s sector, on the eastern outskirts of the city, and while cordoning off the area the company received small arms fire. At approximately the same time just to the east, one of the battalion’s sniper teams set up near the Euphrates River was attacked by 12 to 15 men. At approximately 14:00, a Company E patrol was ambushed. A quick reaction force was dispatched to reinforce the patrol when it engaged with the enemy still further to the east of the city. Two Humvees were hit, and its platoon commander was critically wounded.

== See also ==
- Battle of Ramadi (2006)
