= Erik B. Jørgensen =

Danish author and adventurer

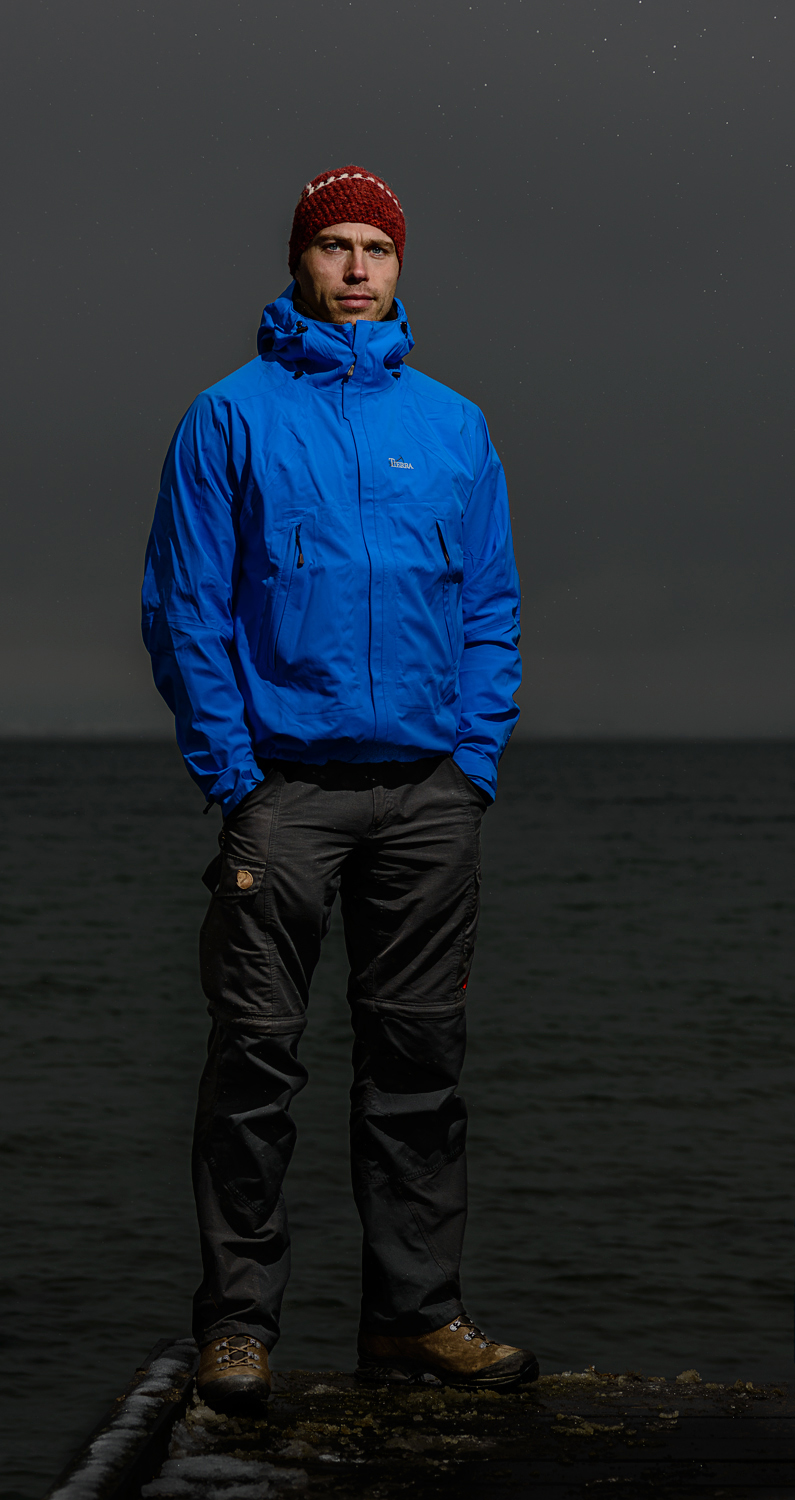

Erik B. Jørgensen is a Danish author, adventurer and television personality. He is known as being an instructor on the Danish television show Korpset, a programme based on the British SAS: Who Dares Wins format.

== Biography ==
Jørgensen was born and raised on a farm in Alkeshave on the island of Funen. After graduation, he served in the Sirius Sled Patrol and later in the Hunter Corps (the Danish army Special Forces). Since then, he has made numerous expeditions, which he details in his books. He is a member of the Adventurers Club of Denmark.

== Bibliography ==
As sole author

- Skandinavian rundt i kajak [Around Scandinavia by kayak]. Kom ud (2013)
- Danmark rundt i kayak: isvinteren 2009-10 [Around Denmark by kayak: Winter 2009-10]. Glyndendal (2010)
- Oplevelser i ukendt land, I Knud Rasmussens fodspor [Experiences in uncharted lands, in the footsteps of Knud Rasmussen]. Glyndenal (2009)

As contributor

- "Grønlands vildmark – brug den" ["Greenland's Wilderness"] in Lauridsen, Lena (2015). Inussuk, pejling mod Grønland [Inussuk: Heading to Greenland]. Culture Crossing.
- "Den helt store tur med ski, pulk og drage" ["Grand Tour by ski and sled"] in Magical Greenland: Death and Drama on the Glacier. Tales of the Adventurers Club. Glyndendal (2014)
