= SAS: Who Dares Wins =

2015 British reality television series

- Genre: Reality television
- Starring: Ant Middleton; Jason 'Foxy' Fox; Matthew 'Ollie' Ollerton; Mark 'Billy' Billingham; Jay Morton; Colin Maclachlan; Melvyn Downes; Anthony Stazicker; Rudy Reyes; Remi Adeleke; Chris Oliver
- Narrated by: Shaun Dooley
- Country of origin: United Kingdom
- Original language: English
- No. of series: 8 (regular); 8 (celebrity)
- No. of episodes: 45 (regular); 56 (celebrity)

Production
- Producers: Phil Turner; Freddie Foss-Smith
- Editor: Joss Maines
- Running time: 60 minutes
- Production company: Minnow Films

Original release
- Network: Channel 4
- Release: 19 October 2015 – 21 February 2023
- Release: 7 April 2019 – present

SAS: Who Dares Wins is a reality quasi-military training television programme broadcast by Channel 4 in the United Kingdom since 19 October 2015. It features civilians, and later celebrities, attempting to complete a modified version of Special Air Service (SAS) training. The financial success of the celebrity series led Channel 4 to drop the original civilian series after its 2023 season.

== Format ==
The show pits contestants against harsh environments all around the world, in a shortened training course designed to simulate a condensed version of the actual United Kingdom Special Forces selection course. The show's Directing Staff take the recruits through hostile and unforgiving warfare environments, while testing their mental and physical ability through a series of realistic training exercises. Each series ends with a simulated experience of being captured and interrogated, which is overseen by an anonymous former senior chief intelligence officer referred to as "the Umpire". This is sometimes followed by an additional stage.

Unlike many reality competition series, there are no formal elimination points. Instead, each contestant is given a numbered armband, which they can hand in to the DS to 'voluntarily withdraw' (VW) themselves if they feel they cannot continue. They can also be culled by the DS or be medically withdrawn.

== History ==
The fourth series, which aired in early 2019, allowed female recruits to take part for the first time, in line with the Ministry of Defence's announcement that women would now be able to serve in all areas of the UK military, including the Special Forces.

A celebrity version aired for the first time in 2019 in aid of Stand Up to Cancer. Chief instructor Ant Middleton said of the concept, ‘Celebrities go through their lives showing the public a front and face they want them to see but this process stripped all that away.’

After the eighth series of the civilian version concluded in 2023, the civilian version was shelved indefinitely to prioritise the celebrity version, which Channel 4 deemed a 'huge success'.

== Cast ==
The original Chief Instructor was Ant Middleton, an ex-United Kingdom Special Forces Corporal who served in the Royal Marines, British Army, and Special Boat Service. The other Directing Staff (DS) consisted of Jason 'Foxy' Fox, a former SBS Sergeant; Colin Maclachlan, an ex-SAS operator; and Matthew 'Ollie' Ollerton, another ex-SBS operator. Mark 'Billy' Billingham, an ex-SAS Sergeant Major, replaced Maclachlan in the second civilian series and has been featured in every civilian and celebrity series since, whereas Fox is the only original DS member to have appeared in all seasons.

In 2021, Middleton was dismissed from the show over his 'personal conduct'. It was speculated that this was linked to Middleton's controversial tweets about the Black Lives Matter movement. Middleton subsequently claimed 'the woke patrol have kicked in to the point where we can't say anything, we can't be ourselves'.

In October 2021, former United States Recon Marine Rudy Reyes was announced as the series's new Chief Instructor. In 2023, the Directing Staff were joined by Chris Oliver, a former Royal Marine Mountain Leader and ex-Special Boat Service operator.

Other DS have included Melvyn Downes in 2021, who served in the SAS for 12 years and was the first DS member of colour, and Veteran Navy SEAL Senior Chief Remi Adeleke in 2022.

| Name | Position | Civilian series | | | | | | | | Celebrity series | | | | | | |
| Name | Position | 1 (2015) | 2 (2016) | 3 (2018) | 4 (2019) | 5 (2020) | 6 (2021) | 7 (2022) | 8 (2023) | 1 (2019) | 2 (2020) | 3 (2021) | 4 (2022) | 5 (2023) | 6 (2024) | 7 (2025) |
|---|---|---|---|---|---|---|---|---|---|---|---|---|---|---|---|---|
| Jason "Foxy" Fox | Directing Staff (1–) | Main | | | | | | | | Main | | | | | | |
| Mark "Billy" Billingham | Directing Staff (2–7); Chief Instructor (8–) | | Main | | | | | | | Main | | | | | | |
| Remi Adeleke | Directing Staff (7) | | | | | | | Main | | | | | Main | | | |
| Rudy Reyes | Chief Instructor (7); Directing Staff (8–) | | | | | | | Main | | | | | Main | | | |
| Ant Middleton | Chief Instructor (1–6) | Main | | | | | | | | Main | | | | | | |
| Matthew "Ollie" Ollerton | Directing Staff (1–5) | Main | | | | | | | | Main | | | | | | |
| Colin Maclachlan | Directing Staff (1) | Main | | | | | | | | | | | | | | |
| Jay Morton | Directing Staff | | | | | Guest | | | | | Main | | | | | |
| Melvyn Downes | Directing Staff (6) | | | | | | Main | | | | | Main | | | | |
| Anthony Stazicker | Directing Staff | | | | | | Guest | | | | | Main | | | | |
| Chris Oliver | Directing Staff (8–) | | | | | | | | Main | | | | | Main | | |

== Regular series ==
Series overview
| Series | Start date | End date | Episodes | Location | Winners |
|---|---|---|---|---|---|
| 1 | 19 October 2015 | 16 November 2015 | 5 | Wales | Freddie Iron and Ryan Roddy |
| 2 | 17 October 2016 | 14 November 2016 | 5 | Ecuador | Moses Adeyemi |
| 3 | 7 January 2018 | 4 February 2018 | 5 | Morocco | Jonathan Davis and Matt Sallis |
| 4 | 6 January 2019 | 10 February 2019 | 6 | Chile | Mark Peart, Louise McCullough and Milo Mackin |
| 5 | 5 January 2020 | 9 February 2020 | 6 | Scotland | James Priestley and Chris O |
| 6 | 9 May 2021 | 14 June 2021 | 6 | Scotland | Connor Smyth and Kieran Lang |
| 7 | 10 April 2022 | 15 May 2022 | 6 | Jordan | Shylla Duhaney and Paige Zima |
| 8 | 23 January 2023 | 21 February 2023 | 6 | Vietnam | Grant, Hilary and Joshua |

== Celebrity series ==
Series overview
| Series | Start date | End date | Episodes | Location | Winners |
|---|---|---|---|---|---|
| 1 | 7 April 2019 | 5 May 2019 | 5 | Chile | Wayne Bridge |
| 2 | 20 April 2020 | 25 May 2020 | 6 | Scotland | Lauren Steadman and DJ Locksmith |
| 3 | 29 August 2021 | 3 October 2021 | 6 | Scotland | Alexandra Burke, Aled Davies and Wes Nelson |
| 4 | 4 September 2022 | 16 October 2022 | 7 | Jordan | Calum Best, Ferne McCann, AJ Pritchard and Maisie Smith |
| 5 | 26 September 2023 | 5 November 2023 | 7 | Vietnam | Gareth Gates |
| 6 | 22 September 2024 | 14 October 2024 | 8 | New Zealand | Georgia Harrison and Lani Daniels |
| 7 | 3 August 2025 | 25 August 2025 | 8 | Wales | Troy Deeney, Michaella McCollum and Lucy Spraggan |
| 8 | 4 January 2026 | 26 January 2026 | 8 | Morocco | Emily Seebohm, Dani Dyer and Gabby Allen |

=== Series 1 (2019) ===
In April 2019, a special series in which all of the recruits were celebrities was aired as Celebrity SAS: Who Dares Wins, for Stand Up to Cancer UK. Among the celebrity recruits were Victoria Pendleton, Ben Foden, Heather Fisher, AJ Odudu, Jeff Brazier, Wayne Bridge, Sam Thompson, Andrea McLean, Jeremy Irvine, Dev, Louise Mensch and Camilla Thurlow (Love Island). Unlike previous series, this celebrity version was filmed in the Andes Mountains in Chile.

| Recruit | Celebrity | Known for | Status (Episode number) |
|---|---|---|---|
| 8 | Wayne Bridge | Former Premier League footballer | Passed (5) |
| 11 | AJ Odudu | Television presenter | Culled (5) |
| 3 | Jeff Brazier | Television presenter | Culled (5) |
| 5 | Victoria Pendleton | Former Olympic track cyclist | Culled (5) |
| 12 | Sam Thompson | Television & radio personality | Voluntarily Withdrawn (5) |
| 9 | Ben Foden | England rugby union player | Voluntarily Withdrawn (5) |
| 10 | Heather Fisher | Rugby union and rugby sevens player | Culled (5) |
| 6 | Jeremy Irvine | Actor | Voluntarily Withdrawn (5) |
| 2 | Dev | BBC Radio 1 presenter | Voluntarily Withdrawn (4) |
| 7 | Camilla Thurlow | Love Island finalist & humanitarian worker | Voluntarily Withdrawn (4) |
| 4 | Andrea McLean | Former Loose Women panellist | Voluntarily Withdrawn (2) |
| 1 | Louise Mensch | Blogger, novelist & former Conservative MP | Voluntarily Withdrawn (1) |

=== Series 2 (2020) ===
A second celebrity series began airing on Monday 20 April 2020. Among the celebrity recruits were: Katie Price, Joey Essex, Anthea Turner, Helen Skelton, Brendan Cole, John Fashanu, Nikki Sanderson, Jack Maynard (YouTube star), Lauren Steadman, Locksmith (DJ of Rudimental), Tony Bellew and Yasmin Evans. This series was filmed on the island of Raasay in Scotland.

| Recruit | Celebrity | Known for | Status (Episode number) |
|---|---|---|---|
| 6 | Locksmith | DJ of Rudimental | Passed (6) |
| 7 | Lauren Steadman | Paralympic athlete | Passed (6) |
| 10 | Helen Skelton | Television presenter | Culled (6) |
| 8 | Nikki Sanderson | Actress | Culled (6) |
| 1 | Joey Essex | Former The Only Way Is Essex cast member | Voluntarily Withdrawn (6) |
| 11 | Tony Bellew | Former professional boxer | Culled (6) |
| 2 | Brendan Cole | Former Strictly Come Dancing professional | Culled (4) |
| 12 | Yasmin Evans | Radio & television presenter | Culled (3) |
| 4 | John Fashanu | Former England footballer & television presenter | Culled (3) |
| 9 | Jack Maynard | YouTube personality & DJ | Voluntarily Withdrawn (2) |
| 5 | Anthea Turner | Television presenter | Voluntarily Withdrawn (2) |
| 3 | Katie Price | Model, media & TV personality | Voluntarily Withdrawn (2) |

=== Series 3 (2021) ===
A third celebrity series began airing on 29 August 2021. Among the celebrity recruits were: Ulrika Jonsson, Kerry Katona, Alexandra Burke, Wes Nelson, James Cracknell, Shanaze Reade, Ore Oduba, Aled Davies, Vicky Pattison, Saira Khan, Kieron Dyer and Jake Quickenden. The series was filmed on the island of Raasay in Scotland.

| Recruit | Celebrity | Known for | Status (Episode number) |
|---|---|---|---|
| 7 | Alexandra Burke | Singer, songwriter & actress | Passed (6) |
| 8 | Aled Davies | Paralympic athlete | Passed (6) |
| 9 | Wes Nelson | Singer & television personality | Passed (6) |
| 2 | Ore Oduba | Television & radio presenter | Culled (6) |
| 6 | James Cracknell | Former Olympic rower | Voluntarily Withdrawn (6) |
| 12 | Kieron Dyer | Former Premier League footballer | Medically Withdrawn (4) |
| 4 | Jake Quickenden | Singer & television personality | Medically Withdrawn (3) |
| 10 | Shanaze Reade | Former BMX racer | Medically Withdrawn (3) |
| 11 | Vicky Pattison | Television & media personality | Voluntarily Withdrawn (3) |
| 5 | Saira Khan | Television & media personality | Voluntarily Withdrawn (3) |
| 3 | Ulrika Jonsson | Television presenter | Medically Withdrawn (2) |
| 1 | Kerry Katona | Television & media personality | Voluntarily Withdrawn (2) |

=== Series 4 (2022) ===
A fourth series began airing on 4 September 2022. Among the celebrity recruits were: Calum Best, Maisie Smith, Jonathan Broom-Edwards, Ashley Cain, Dwain Chambers, Shannon Courtenay, Jennifer Ellison, Jade Jones, Amber Gill, AJ Pritchard, Curtis Pritchard, Ferne McCann, Pete Wicks and Fatima Whitbread; she was 60 years old when the series was filmed and is the show's oldest recruit. The series was set in Wadi Rum Desert in Jordan and filmed in October 2021; the former set of French game show The Desert Forges was used as the base.

| Recruit | Celebrity | Known for | Status (Episode number) |
|---|---|---|---|
| 8 | AJ Pritchard | Former Strictly Come Dancing professional | Passed (7) |
| 3 | Calum Best | Television personality | Passed (7) |
| 4 | Ferne McCann | Former The Only Way Is Essex cast member | Passed (7) |
| 12 | Maisie Smith | Former EastEnders actress | Passed (7) |
| 10 | Jade Jones | Olympic taekwondo athlete | Culled (7) |
| 14 | Ashley Cain | Footballer & television personality | Voluntarily Withdrawn (7) |
| 11 | Shannon Courtenay | Professional boxer | Voluntarily Withdrawn (7) |
| 6 | Jonathan Broom-Edwards | Paralympic athlete | Voluntarily Withdrawn (6) |
| 1 | Jennifer Ellison | Former Brookside actress | Culled (5) |
| 5 | Fatima Whitbread | Olympic javelin thrower | Culled (5) |
| 9 | Curtis Pritchard | Professional dancer & Love Island finalist | Culled (4) |
| 13 | Dwain Chambers | Olympic sprinter | Culled (4) |
| 2 | Pete Wicks | The Only Way Is Essex cast member | Medically Withdrawn (2) |
| 7 | Amber Gill | Love Island winner & author | Culled (2) |

=== Series 5 (2023) ===
The line-up for the fifth series was announced on 14 September 2023. The series was set in Thung Ui, Northern Vietnam and began airing on 26 September 2023. Among the celebrity recruits were: Danielle Lloyd, Michelle Heaton, Amber Turner, Melinda Messenger, Gareth Gates, Matt Hancock, Gareth Thomas, James Argent, Jermaine Pennant, Siva Kaneswaran, Jon-Allan Butterworth, Teddy Soares, Montana Brown, Kirsty-Leigh Porter, Perri Shakes-Drayton and Zoe Lyons.

| Recruit | Celebrity | Known for | Status (Episode number) |
|---|---|---|---|
| 7 | Gareth Gates | Singer-songwriter & actor | Passed (7) |
| 11 | Danielle Lloyd | Model & television personality | Culled (7) |
| 1 | Matt Hancock | Conservative Party politician | Culled (7) |
| 6 | Perri Shakes-Drayton | Olympic athlete | Culled (7) |
| 3 | Teddy Soares | Love Island contestant | Culled (7) |
| 10 | Amber Turner | The Only Way Is Essex cast member | Voluntarily Withdrawn (6) |
| 13 | Zoe Lyons | Comedian | Culled (5) |
| 2 | James Argent | Former The Only Way Is Essex cast member | Voluntarily Withdrawn (5) |
| 8 | Montana Brown | Love Island contestant | Medically Withdrawn (5) |
| 5 | Jermaine Pennant | Footballer | Medically Withdrawn (4) |
| 14 | Siva Kaneswaran | The Wanted singer | Medically Withdrawn (4) |
| 9 | Jon-Allan Butterworth | Paralympic cyclist | Medically Withdrawn (4) |
| 12 | Gareth Thomas | Former Wales rugby player | Medically Withdrawn (3) |
| 15 | Melinda Messenger | Model & television personality | Culled (3) |
| 4 | Michelle Heaton | Liberty X singer | Culled (3) |
| 16 | Kirsty-Leigh Porter | Hollyoaks actress | Voluntarily Withdrawn (2) |

=== Series 6 (2024) ===
An eight-part sixth series began airing in September 2024; the filming took place in New Zealand. The line-up for the series was reported in July 2023, with Pete Wicks set to feature as the first returning recruit following his medical evacuation from the fourth series.

| Recruit | Celebrity | Known for | Status (Episode number) |
|---|---|---|---|
| 10 | Georgia Harrison | Television personality | Passed (8) |
| 9 | Lani Daniels | New Zealand Professional boxer | Passed (8) |
| 3 | Bianca Gascoigne | Model & television personality | Voluntarily Withdrawn (8) |
| 8 | Anthony Ogogo | Olympic boxer & Professional Wrestler | Culled (8) |
| 7 | Ovie Soko | Love Island finalist & basketball player | Voluntarily Withdrawn (7) |
| 15 | Bobby Norris | Former The Only Way Is Essex cast member | Medically Withdrawn (7) |
| 12 | Cherry Healey | Television presenter | Voluntarily Withdrawn (7) |
| 5 | Pete Wicks | Former The Only Way Is Essex cast member | Voluntarily Withdrawn (6) |
| 14 | Shazia Mirza | Stand-up comedian & actress | Culled (5) |
| 2 | Rachel Johnson | Journalist & television presenter | Voluntarily Withdrawn (4) |
| 1 | Ellie Downie | Olympic artistic gymnast | Voluntarily Withdrawn (4) |
| 11 | Chris Robshaw | Former England rugby player | Medically Withdrawn (3) |
| 6 | Tez Ilyas | Stand-up comedian | Culled (3) |
| 4 | Marnie Simpson | Geordie Shore cast member | Voluntarily Withdrawn (3) |
| 13 | John Barrowman | Actor & singer | Voluntarily Withdrawn (1) |

=== Series 7 (2025) ===
In June 2024, it was reported that filming of the seventh series would take place that summer in Wales. The series was filmed on the island of Anglesey and began airing on 3 August 2025.

| Recruit | Celebrity | Known for | Status (Episode number) |
|---|---|---|---|
| 10 | Troy Deeney | Former professional footballer | Passed (8) |
| 3 | Michaella McCollum | Convicted drug smuggler | Passed (8) |
| 4 | Lucy Spraggan | Singer-songwriter | Passed (8) |
| 1 | Bimini Bon-Boulash | Drag queen | Culled (8) |
| 8 | Adam Collard | Love Island contestant | Voluntarily Withdrawn (8) |
| 11 | Conor Benn | Professional boxer | Medically Withdrawn (6) |
| 13 | Rebecca Loos | Former glamour model and media personality | Voluntarily Withdrawn (5) |
| 9 | Lady Leshurr | Rapper & singer | Voluntarily Withdrawn (5) |
| 6 | Harry Clark | The Traitors winner | Culled (4) |
| 2 | Adebayo "The Beast" Akinfenwa | Former professional footballer | Voluntarily Withdrawn (4) |
| 5 | Tasha Ghouri | Love Island contestant | Voluntarily Withdrawn (2) |
| 12 | Chloe Burrows | Love Island contestant | Voluntarily Withdrawn (2) |
| 14 | Louie Spence | Dancer & choreographer | Voluntarily Withdrawn (1) |
| 7 | Hannah Spearritt | Singer and actress | Voluntarily Withdrawn (1) |

=== Series 8 (2026) ===
In December 2025, it was announced that the next series would see seven Australian celebrities and seven UK celebrities go against each other in Morocco and would begin airing in January 2026.

| Recruit | Celebrity | | Known for | Status (Episode Number) |
|---|---|---|---|---|
| 10 | (Australia) | Emily Seebohm | Retired Olympic swimmer | Passed (8) |
| 4 | (United Kingdom) | Dani Dyer | Reality TV star | Passed (8) |
| 5 | (United Kingdom) | Gabby Allen | Love Island contestant | Passed (8) |
| 14 | (Australia) | Mack Horton | Retired Olympic swimmer | Voluntarily Withdrawn (8) |
| 7 | (United Kingdom) | Ben Cohen | Retired rugby player | Voluntarily Withdrawn (8) |
| 2 | (United Kingdom) | Toby Olubi | Gladiators star, Phantom | Culled (5) |
| 6 | (United Kingdom) | Graeme Swann | Retired cricketer | Medically Withdrawn (5) |
| 12 | (Australia) | Ryan Moloney | Neighbours actor | Voluntarily Withdrawn (5) |
| 9 | (Australia) | Brad Hodge | Retired cricketer | Voluntarily Withdrawn (4) |
| 1 | (United Kingdom) | Cole Anderson-James | YouTuber | Voluntarily Withdrawn (4) |
| 11 | (Australia) | Axle Whitehead | Musician | Medically Withdrawn (4) |
| 3 | (United Kingdom) | Jack Joseph | Social media personality | Voluntarily Withdrawn (4) |
| 13 | (Australia) | Natalie Bassingthwaighte | Actress and singer | Voluntarily Withdrawn (3) |
| 8 | (Australia) | Jessika Power | Reality TV star | Voluntarily Withdrawn (2) |

=== Series 9 (2027) ===
In May 2026, the cast for the upcoming ninth series was revealed with the show returning to its original format. Filmed in Malaysia, it is expected to be aired in early 2027.

The cast was revealed to be made up of:

- Former Strictly Come Dancing professional dancer Giovanni Pernice
- Social media star JoJo Siwa. Siwa previously participated in the second season of the American version of the series, Special Forces: World's Toughest Test.
- Olympic boxing champion Nicola Adams
- Former rugby captain Phil Vickery
- TV personality Amy Childs
- Love Island star Tyrique Hyde
- Married at First Sight UK contestant Ella Morgan
- Social media star George Baggs
- The Apprentice star Thomas Skinner
- Farrier Sam Wolfenden
- 'Ibiza final boss' Jack Kay
- Model & TV personality Adeola Patronne
- Sportscaster Anna Woolhouse
- Actor Dominic Wilson

== International versions ==
Banijay holds the international rights to the show, and a total of six international adaptions have currently been produced around the globe; amongst the first ones were Australia, Denmark and Sweden.

An Australian version of the show is currently being produced for Seven Network as SAS Australia: Who Dares Wins. Its first season was Australia's most watched new show of the year. It aired for four series, before being cancelled in 2024. The Swedish version, Elitstyrkans hemligheter (English: Secrets of the Elite Force), is broadcast on TV4 and premiered on 24 January 2021. It won the reality show category award at Kristallen 2021.

The Dutch version, Special Forces VIPS: Wie durft wint (English: Special Forces VIP: Who dares wins), premiered on 19 December 2021 on RTL's streaming platform Videoland. The Finnish version, Erikoisjoukot (English: Special Forces), premiered on 30 May 2022, on Nelonen and its streaming service Ruutu. It was also nominated at the Golden Venla awards in 2022.

An American version, Special Forces: World's Toughest Test, premiered on 4 January 2023 on Fox. The Belgium version, titled Special Forces: Wie Durft Wint (English: Special Forces: Who Dares Wins), premiered in summer 2023 on VTM network.

Legend: Currently airing Upcoming version/season No longer airing Current status unknown

| Country | Title | Narrated by | Current Directing Staff | Network | First aired |
|---|---|---|---|---|---|
| Australia | SAS Australia: Who Dares Wins | Gerard Dunning | Ant Middleton; Matthew "Ollie" Ollerton; Anthony "Staz" Stazicker; Jay Morton | Seven Network | 19 October 2020 |
| Belgium (Flanders) | Special Forces: Wie Durft Wint (Special Forces: Who Dares Wins) | Unknown | Unknown | VTM | 1 May 2023 |
| Netherlands | Special Forces VIPS: Wie durft wint (Special Forces VIP: Who Dares Wins) | Gijs Scholten van Asschat | Erik Wegewijs; Bas Kremer; Mitchell Ossenbaar; Nikki Koppedraaijer | Videoland | 19 December 2021 |
| Denmark | Korpset – Gjort af det rette stof (The Corps – Made of the right stuff) | —N/a | Thomas Rathsack; Erik B. Jørgensen; Rune Krogh Danielsen; Rune Viborg | TV2 | 4 January 2017 |
| Finland | Erikoisjoukot (Special Forces) | Mikko Leskelä | Janne „Janezkyy" Lehtonen; Jan Knutti; Matias Petäistö; Robin Hendry | Nelonen | 2 January 2023 |
| Hungary | A Kiképzés (The Training) | Stohl András | Oravecz Kristóf; Molnár Attila; Farkas András; Nagy Ádám | TV2 | 2025 |
| Poland | Siły specjalne Polska (Special Forces Poland) | Unknown | Wojciech „Zachar" Zacharków; Marek „Włóczykij" Stan; Piotr „Gniady" Hajkowski; Piotr „Soyers" Soyka | Polsat | 3 September 2024 |
| Sweden | Elitstyrkans hemligheter (The Secrets of Elite Forces) | Stefan Sauk | Jesper Berlin; Anders Eriksson; Johan Reispass; Petra Malm | TV4 | 24 January 2021 |
| United Kingdom | SAS: Who Dares Wins (Flagship/Original) | Shaun Dooley | Mark "Billy" Billingham; Jason "Foxy" Fox; Rudy Reyes; Chris Oliver | Channel 4 | 19 October 2015 |
| United States | Special Forces: World's Toughest Test | Shaun Dooley | Rudy Reyes; Jason "Foxy" Fox; Mark "Billy" Billingham; Jovon "Q" Quarles | Fox | 4 January 2023 |

== See also ==
- SAS: Are You Tough Enough?, similar British TV show aired by the BBC from 2002 to 2004.
- Special Forces: Ultimate Hell Week (2015–2017)
- Who Dares Wins, a 1982 British action film on the SAS.
