= Rudy Reyes (actor) =

American actor and marine (born 1971)

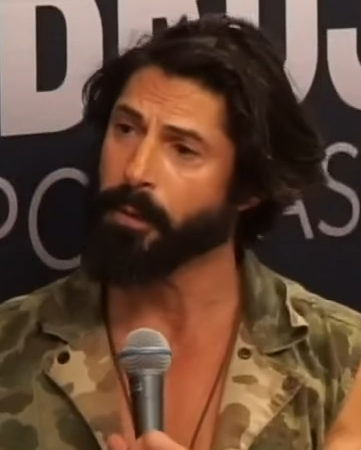
- Reyes in 2019
- Born: December 3, 1971 (age 54); Kansas City, Missouri, U.S.
- Military career
- Allegiance: United States
- Branch: United States Marine Corps
- Service years: 1998–2005
- Rank: Sergeant
- Nicknames: Fruity Rudy, the Associate
- Unit: 1st Reconnaissance Battalion
- Conflicts: War in Afghanistan; 2001 invasion of Afghanistan; Iraq War; 2003 invasion of Iraq; First Battle of Fallujah; Battle of Ramadi
- Other work: Presenter, actor, martial arts instructor

Rodolfo "Rudy" Reyes (born December 3, 1971) is an American martial arts instructor, actor, and United States Marine Corps veteran. His role in the 2003 invasion of Iraq was detailed in the book Generation Kill by the journalist Evan Wright, and as an actor Reyes is best known for portraying himself in its 2008 HBO TV adaptation.

== Early years ==
Rodolfo "Rudy" Reyes was born on December 3, 1971 at Richards-Gebaur Air Force Base, Kansas City, Missouri, to a United States Marine father, Rodolfo Reyes Sr., en route to Vietnam. Reyes was raised by his grandparents until 1976 when both his grandmother and grandfather died in the same year. He spent the next few years being shuffled between relatives and eventually the Omaha Home for Boys. At 15, Reyes started studying kung fu. At 17, Reyes emancipated himself and took custody of his two younger brothers, after which he moved to Kansas City, Missouri. There, he continued to study and teach kung fu with his brothers.

He continued training martial arts, including sanda (kickboxing and judo), while working various jobs, from construction to bussing tables, before he decided to join the military. By then he had become an accomplished martial artist, winning over 20 medals.

== Military career ==
Reyes enlisted in the United States Marine Corps as an infantryman in 1998, attended the Marine Corps School of Infantry, and was ultimately selected for (and passed) Marine Recon training. The process included a three-year training period as a paratrooper, combat diver, demolition expert, survival expert, close quarters combatant, and mountain warfare expert, before he became part of the 15th Marine Expeditionary Unit. Reyes served on the USS Dubuque and often led platoon PT sessions on ship. He was on the ship during the 9/11 attacks, and was among the first American troops deployed for the 2001 invasion of Afghanistan, serving as a point man and scout sniper. He was part of a combat reconnaissance mission during the invasion, first in Pakistan and then in Afghanistan.

After that, during the 2003 invasion of Iraq, Reyes was a team leader within the 1st Reconnaissance Battalion, which became the tip of the spear as the 1st Marine Division advanced on Baghdad; journalist Evan Wright embedded within Reyes' platoon and later wrote Generation Kill, a book depicting the events of the invasion from the perspective of the Recon Marines. Reyes later fought in the battles of Fallujah and Ramadi in 2004. He served three tours in Iraq and Afghanistan during his two enlistments in the Marine Corps.

== Stunts, actor, and writer ==
After leaving the military in 2005, Reyes became a fitness trainer at a gym in San Diego. He has since worked as an actor, martial arts and survival instructor, and brand ambassador, and has also worked in Africa training wildlife preserve rangers in anti-poaching tactics.

Reyes has had several film and television acting roles, including as himself in Generation Kill (2008) and the TV series Apocalypse Man (2010), Ultimate Survival Alaska (2013–2014), and Spartan Race (2016–2017). He is also one of the interviewees of the 2020 documentary series Once Upon a Time in Iraq; in the latter, he detailed the killing of civilians during the invasion by himself and others. He played Penny in The Demeter, Rick in Beach Massacre, "Solomon Goodblood" in the 2021 film The Secret of Sinchanee. In 2022, he became the lead instructor on SAS: Who Dares Wins. He also portrays the playable character "Enzo Reyes" in the Call of Duty: Modern Warfare II multiplayer.

Reyes wrote the book, Hero Living: Seven Strides to Awaken Your Infinite Power (2009), with Angela Smith. He has also authored articles for OFFGRID magazine.

== Personal life ==
In 2016, Rudy Reyes was a co-founder of the Force Blue Team, a non-profit which seeks to address post-traumatic stress disorder in the veteran community by connecting former special operations personnel with marine scientists involved in coral reef conservation efforts.

== See also ==
- List of U.S. Marines
