= Billy Billingham =

British soldier, author and TV personality (born 1965)

Mark "Billy" Billingham
- Born: June 10, 1965 (age 61); England, United Kingdom
- Known for: Former SAS soldier, author, television personality, motivational speaker
- Military career
- Allegiance: United Kingdom
- Branch: British Army
- Service years: 1983–2003
- Rank: Warrant Officer Class 1 (Sergeant Major)
- Units: Parachute Regiment; 22 Special Air Service
- Awards: MBE; Queen’s Commendation for Bravery
- Other work: Chief Instructor on SAS: Who Dares Wins; Bodyguard for Brad Pitt and Angelina Jolie; Author of The Hard Way and Survive to Fight; Motivational speaker
- Website: www.gordonpoole.com/talent/mark-billy-billingham/

Mark Anthony Billingham MBE QCB (born 10 June 1965), often referred to by his nickname 'Billy', is a British former soldier, author, television personality, and security consultant. He is best known as the Chief Instructor on the Channel 4 series SAS: Who Dares Wins and its international adaptations, as well as for his decorated career in the Special Air Service (SAS).

== Early life ==
Billingham was born in England and joined the British Army at the age of 17.

== Military career ==
Billingham enlisted in the Parachute Regiment in 1983, serving as a Patrol Commander on worldwide operational tours and later as a training instructor.

In 1991, Billingham passed SAS selection and joined 22nd Special Air Service Regiment (22 SAS), B Squadron, as a Mountain Troop specialist. He rose to the rank of Warrant Officer Class 1 (Sergeant Major), serving for over 20 years in the SAS. Billingham was involved in operations across Iraq, Afghanistan, South America, and Africa, and led numerous hostage rescues. He received the MBE and the Queen's Commendation for Bravery.

Billingham was appointed a Member of the Order of the British Empire (MBE) in recognition of his distinguished service with the Special Air Service. The honour was awarded for his leadership in multiple high‑risk operations, including hostage rescues and counter‑terrorism missions, and for his contribution to British military capability over two decades.

== Post‑military career ==
After leaving the SAS, Billingham worked as a bodyguard for clients including Brad Pitt and Angelina Jolie.

Billingham became a directing staff (DS) on Channel 4’s SAS: Who Dares Wins in 2015, later serving as Chief Instructor. He also appears on Fox TV's 'Special Forces: World's Toughest Test', on Seasons 1 and 2 of SAS Australia and presented his own BBC One series SAS: Catching the Criminals.

Billingham has written several books, including:

- The Hard Way: Adapt, Survive and Win (2019)
- Call to Kill (2021)
- Survive to Fight (2022)
- Further - 10 lessons the SAS taught me about life (2025)

Billingham also works as a motivational speaker, delivering talks on leadership, resilience, and overcoming adversity.

== Personal life ==
Billingham is married and lives in the United Kingdom. He continues to work as a motivational speaker and television personality.
