= TOWIE Live =

- The Only Way Is Essex episode
- Episode no.: Series 7 Episode 12
- Directed by: Tony Gregory; Iain Patrick (assistant); Mark Sinton (2nd assistant)
- Editing by: Jan Deas
- Original air date: 3 December 2012
- Running time: 50 minutes

Guest appearances
- Pat Sharp; 2 Shoes

Episode chronology
← Previous; Series 7, Episode 11	Next → "The Only Way Is Essexmas 2012"
- The Only Way Is Essex (series 7)

"TOWIE Live" is the second episode of a series of special episodes airing throughout December 2012 of The Only Way Is Essex. The episode originally aired live on the ITV2 television network in the United Kingdom on 3 December 2012, becoming the first reality television series to ever broadcast a live episode.

== Cast ==
- Joey Essex
- Jessica Wright
- James "Arg" Argent
- Kirk Norcross
- Mick Norcross
- Lydia Rose Bright
- Lucy Mecklenburgh
- Sam Faiers
- Chloe Sims
- Gemma Collins
- Lauren Pope
- Mario Falcone
- Patricia "Nanny Pat" Brooker
- Billie Faiers
- Debbie Douglas
- Carol Wright
- Billi Mucklow
- Cara Kilbey
- Tom Pearce
- Ricky Rayment
- James "Diags" Bennewith
- Bobby-Cole Norris
- Charlie King
- Chris "Little Chris" Drake
- Danni Park-Dempsey
- Joan Collins
- Jasmin Walia

== Storylines ==
The episode begins with pre-recorded footage of cast members and guests arriving on a red carpet to Arg's charity talent show. Arg, who can't seem to find his trousers, walks through the theatre hallways with Diags. Arg and Diags walk into the girls' dressing room where Carol is giving a horrified Debbie a spray tan. Nanny Pat begins to call for Arg to come to the stage over the intercom. Lucy, Billie, Sam, Jess, Carol and Debbie wish Arg good luck as he leaves to go to the stage. It is revealed that Nanny Pat has been hiding Arg's trousers as punishment for him not inviting the Wrights to the barn party in the previous episode. Arg puts his trousers on and walks out on stage to begin the show with Gemma, Bobby, Cara and Billie watching from the audience. The scene then cuts to a conversation between Joey and Chloe. Joey asks Chloe for some advice on proposing to Sam.

Meanwhile, Debbie and Carol perform a skit on stage. In the audience, Bobby expresses his disappointment to Gemma at not being asked to be part of the show. The conversation then turns to the mystery man Bobby has been texting and the genuineness of Jasmin and Charlie's relationship. Cara and Billie, sitting behind them, eventually asks them to be quiet. Back to the skit, Carol accidentally falls off her chair during the performance. The scene then cuts to a conversation between Sam and Kirk, with Kirk revealing he's nervous about his upcoming performance. The two then discuss Kirk's date with Jasmin Walia (featured in the previous episode), with Kirk expressing his disappointment with Jasmin after she had dates with both himself and Charlie in the same night. Sam then goes on to talk about comments Chloe made about Joey possibly proposing to her. The scene cuts back to the stage again, with Jess now performing her new single, "Dominoes". The scene then abruptly cuts back to Sam and Kirk, who are waiting to start their scene. A voice can be heard in the background, telling Kirk to talk about Lauren Pope and then Kirk begins talking to Sam about Lauren. He then reveals that the two have been speaking to each other again and also reveals that they had slept together. Arg runs into the room, stressing that Charlie has five minutes to get ready to perform.

The show returns with Diags introducing Charlie, who performs the Jennifer Lopez song "On the Floor" with back-up dancers. The scene then cuts away to a conversation between Chloe, Frankie and Lauren, with Lauren confirming she slept with Kirk. The show then returns to the end of Charlie's performance. Diags then goes to find Joey and the two chat about Sam and Joey's relationship. Arg returns to the stage to perform "Singin' in the Rain". The scene then shortly cuts to backstage, where Lydia is praising her mother Debbie's performance in her skit earlier in the show. The show then goes back to the stage for the end of Arg's performance.

The scene then cuts to Mario, Joey and Tom in the dressing room, getting ready for their One Direction performance later in the show. After what seems to be a false start, the conversation begins again. Nanny Pat then introduces Chloe and Diags to the stage to perform Aqua's "Barbie Girl" with Frankie and Lauren in the background. The scene then abruptly cuts to Charlie and Jasmin arguing about Jasmin having a date with Kirk before seeing him for their date. Danni can be seen briefly walking into the scene, but quickly walks back.

The show returns with the One Direction performance featuring Mario, Joey, Tom, Arg, Diags, Sam, Gemma, Danni, Lucy and Billie. Pat Sharp and 2 Shoes can be seen in the audience during the performance. The performance then finishes and cuts to backstage where an argument between Lydia and Arg starts, with Debbie trying to be mediator and Nanny Pat looking on. The show then returns to the stage, with Kirk performing Dean Martin's "Ain't That a Kick in the Head". Sam and Joey sit down to talk about their relationship and marriage, with Joey revealing he feels pressured. Jess, Arg and Gemma return to the stage to perform Wham!'s "Last Christmas", with all the cast of the show in the background.

== Production ==
ITV announced on 13 November 2012 that a series of three Christmas specials of The Only Way Is Essex would air throughout December 2012, with one episode being broadcast live. Former X Factor contestant, Rylan Clark, was reportedly set to make an appearance during the special, but dropped out after reports of conflict between Clark and several cast members, with Mario Falcone branding Clark "a douchebag". Falcone threatened to leave the series altogether if Clark were to join the show full time.

== Reception ==
The episode was met mostly with unfavourable reviews. Alex Fletcher of Digital Spy called the episode "monstrous", adding "TOWIE Live wasn't car crash TV. It was a car crashed into the side of a train that had been knocked off the rails by a Boeing 717. With a trouser-less James 'Arg' Argent dancing on top of the wreckage." Fletcher also believed the argument between Lydia and Arg to be "fake". Stuart Heritage of The Guardian was mainly critical of the episode in his review, comparing it to EastEnders' own live episode back in 2010, stating "Compared with TOWIE Live, that was Citizen Kane."
