= The Only Way Is Essex series 11 =

The Only Way Is Essex
- Season 11
- No. of episodes: 12

Release
- Original network: ITV2
- Original release: 23 February – 2 April 2014

Series chronology
- ← Previous; Series 10 Next → Series 12

The eleventh series of the British semi-reality television programme The Only Way Is Essex was confirmed on 30 January 2014 when it had been announced that it had renewed for a further three series, the eleventh, twelfth and thirteenth. The series premiered on 23 February 2014 with a 60-minute special, and was followed by another 11 episodes. This was also the first series not to include Lucy Mecklenburgh after her departure during the Christmas special after the tenth series. The series also saw the return of Lydia Bright. This was the penultimate series to feature on ITV2

== Cast ==
- Billie Faiers
- Bobby Cole Norris
- Carol Wright
- Charlie Sims
- Chloe Sims
- Dan Osborne
- Danni Armstrong
- Elliott Wright
- Gemma Collins
- Georgia Kousoulou
- Grace Andrews
- Ferne McCann
- Fran Parman
- James "Arg" Argent
- James "Diags" Bennewith
- James "Lockie" Lock
- Jasmin Walia
- Jess Wright
- Joan Collins
- Lauren Pope
- Leah Wright
- Lewis Bloor
- Lydia Bright
- Mario Falcone
- Mark Wright Snr
- Patricia "Nanny Pat" Brooker
- Ricky Rayment
- Sam Faiers
- Tom Pearce

== Episodes ==
No. overall	No. in series	Title	Original release date	Duration	UK viewers
122	1	"Episode 1"	23 February 2014	60 minutes	1,459,000
Billie has some celebrating to do when she goes for a baby scan and discovers she's having a girl, but there's worries for Sam as she's diagnosed with Crohn's disease. Mario introduces his new love interest Grace and invites her to his birthday party, however he's unaware that Grace has another mystery man on the go. Following the split of Charlie and Ferne, Chloe tells Charlie that there has been rumours that Ferne cheated on him. Bobby and Gemma finally make peace, and Lewis is revealed as Grace's mystery man. Charlie angrily confronts Ferne over the rumours.
123	2	"Episode 2"	26 February 2014	50 minutes	1,191,000*
After Charlie and Ferne spend the night together, she finally confesses to cheating on him with Frank, a new boy in Essex. Danni and Lockie discuss buying a house, but it all ends in tears as Danni confides in Jess over rumours that Lockie has cheated. As Diags admits he has feelings for his new flatmate Fran, he's jealous when he sees her and Tom flirting with each other. Lewis tries his luck with Grace but is heartbroken when she goes on a date with Mario. Frank arrives at Gemma's party and offers Ferne a relationship.
124	3	"Episode 3"	2 March 2014	50 minutes	1,474,000
Tom hatches a plan to get Diags to open up about his feelings towards Fran by deliberately making him jealous and taking her out on a date himself. Lockie isn't happy with Jess' advice towards Danni over the cheating rumours. Billie hosts a shake party for everyone to support Sam through her Crohn's disease. Tom's plan backfires as Fran wants another date. Grace backs off from Mario, and Lockie confesses to texting other girls causing Danni to realise she doesn't want to move in with him anymore.
125	4	"Episode 4"	5 March 2014	50 minutes	1,155,000*
Tom begins to feel guilty for hurting Diags and is forced to apologise to an angry Fran. Ferne announces that her and Charlie have cut all ties with each other to avoid temptation. As the girls all go to a spa together, Danni isn't impressed that Lockie has gone on a boys night out. Bobby's questions about secrets in relationships raise Gemma and Jess' suspicions. A jealous Charlie comes face-to-face with Frank, and Diags continues to keep Fran in the dark over his feelings.
126	5	"Episode 5"	9 March 2014	50 minutes	1,263,000*
Charlie tweets screenshots of his texts to Ferne causing tension between her and Frank, and as she tries to explain herself the pair end up splitting. Tom asks Fran on another date, while Arg asks Diags out for dinner in an attempt to get them both together and talking. At the meal, Diags finally admits his feelings towards Fran. With Lockie trying to prove himself towards Danni, they're unaware that Bobby knows the truth about their relationship. As Bobby shows her proof that Lockie is a cheat, he's no choice but to confess leaving Danni devastated.
127	6	"Episode 6"	12 March 2014	50 minutes	1,203,000
Fran admits to Georgia that Tom has made it awkward for her and Diags as she moves out, but a visit from Tom leaves her more angry over the situation. Danni questions Bobby further over the girl Lockie cheated with, but when things don't add up she sides with Lockie again. Arg hosts a food themed party where Frank has another confrontation with Charlie. Diags and Fran have a heart to heart as she admits she also has feelings towards him and asks to move back in. Danni and Lockie hit back at Bobby and Gemma causing another big argument at the party.
128	7	"Episode 7"	16 March 2014	50 minutes	1,558,000
With everyone gossiping about Gemma and Arg spending the night together, Gemma realises that she has feelings for him. Bobby gives Danni the number of the girl who supposedly cheated with Lockie, but she decides to do nothing about it as she trusts her boyfriend. After Carol and Elliott make their feelings towards Ricky clear, Jess gets upset thinking that everyone wants her to break up with him. Diags takes Fran on a first date, whilst Grace and Lewis continue to flirt. Gemma takes matters into her own hands and confesses her love for Arg.
129	8	"Episode 8"	19 March 2014	50 minutes	1,171,000*
Jasmin is hurt to hear that Dan has been spending time with Georgia. Jess continues to get upset after comments from Carol and Elliott about her relationship with Ricky. Grace and Lewis go on their first date, and agree to see each other again. After thinking about all the recent events in her relationship with Lockie, Danni decides to end things. Ricky declares war with Elliott, and Charlie attempts to put an end to Mario's celibacy by taking him to a sex yoga class.
130	9	"Episode 9"	23 March 2014	50 minutes	1,552,000
Chloe reveals that she's recently kissed Mario, as Charlie worries his friend might end up hurting his sister. Lockie isn't impressed to hear that Danni has gone on a singles night with the girls. The rivalry between Ricky and Elliott continues as their families get involved. Jasmin competes for Dan confusing Georgia of her intentions, and Lewis and Grace hit the rocks when his attention turns elsewhere. The Wright's civil chat with the Rayment's suddenly descends into an angry confrontation when Elliott and Ricky lose their temper.
131	10	"Episode 10"	26 March 2014	50 minutes	1,524,000
Lauren gets emotional when it hits home that her best friend Chloe has betrayed her by going with Mario. Dan surprises Jasmin by offering to take her out on a date, and Grace is heartbroken to see that Lewis is talking to his ex-girlfriend Olivia again. On the night of the big fight, Ricky and Elliott call a truce, before Elliott takes to the ring with Lewis. Elliott wins the boxing match as Lockie finally confesses to Danni that he cheated. A guilty Chloe lets Mario down gently.
132	11	"Episode 11"	30 March 2014	50 minutes	1,591,000
Jasmin implies that she has slept with Dan leaving him confused and Georgia jealous, but as they go on their first date together the pair get closer. There's a clear atmosphere between Ferne and Fran at Billie's baby shower, and Bobby admits that he's started seeing someone. Lockie surprises Danni by writing her an apology letter, and she considers taking him back. Mario's attempt to clear the air between Chloe and Lauren backfires as Lauren reveals some of his dirty secrets. Jess is delighted that her family have finally accepted her relationship with Ricky.
133	12	"Episode 12"	2 April 2014	50 minutes	1,568,000
Bobby and Charlie take matters into their own hands in order to get Chloe and Lauren talking again. Dan tells Georgia that nothing is going on between him and Jasmin. Lockie continues to impress Danni in an attempt to win her back, whilst Diags and Fran finally make their relationship official. Sam gets emotional as she announces she's taking a break from Essex to focus on her health, and Lydia's shock return has huge consequences for Gemma's feelings towards Arg.

== Reception ==
=== Ratings ===
Episode	Date	Official ITV2 rating	ITV2 weekly rank	Official ITV2+1 rating	Total ITV2 viewers
Episode 1	23 February 2014	1,272,000	2	187,000	1,459,000
Episode 2	26 February 2014	1,191,000	2		
Episode 3	2 March 2014	1,207,000	1	267,000	1,474,000
Episode 4	5 March 2014	1,155,000	2		
Episode 5	9 March 2014	1,263,000	1		
Episode 6	12 March 2014	969,000	4	234,000	1,203,000
Episode 7	16 March 2014	1,325,000	2	233,000	1,558,000
Episode 8	19 March 2014	1,171,000	3		
Episode 9	23 March 2014	1,342,000	1	210,000	1,552,000
Episode 10	26 March 2014	1,274,000	2	250,000	1,524,000
Episode 11	30 March 2014	1,354,000	1	237,000	1,591,000
Episode 12	2 April 2014	1,320,000	2	248,000	1,568,000
Series average		1,237,000	2	233,000	1,491,000
