= The Only Way Is Essex series 8 =

The Only Way Is Essex
- Season 8
- No. of episodes: 12

Release
- Original network: ITV2
- Original release: 24 February – 3 April 2013

Series chronology
- ← Previous; Series 7 Next → Series 9

The eighth series of The Only Way Is Essex, a British semi-reality television programme, began airing on 24 February 2013 on ITV2. The series consisted of 12 episodes. Series 8 marked the first series not to feature Lydia Bright, after her departure from the series in December 2012. The series also saw the departure of numerous supporting cast members and introduced new supporting cast members.

On 7 March 2013, Mecklenburgh confirmed via her Twitter account that Amy and Sally Broadbent had been used by the show and had been dropped from the cast. On 8 March 2013 Mick Norcross who has appeared from the second series announced his departure from the show. This series also saw the departure of Kirk Norcross for the second time after announcing on Twitter that he had quit the show on 21 March 2013. Cast member Debbie Douglas also announced her departure from the show via Twitter on 29 March 2013.

== Storylines ==
Series 8 of The Only Way Is Essex includes Lucy and Mario's turbulent relationship temporarily coming to an end following numerous cheating allegations. Little Chris' brother, Ben, tells his version of events on the night of the alleged cheating leaving Mario angry as Little Chris sides with his brother over him. Mario and Lucy then decide to take a break from Essex to work things out between them. They return together again but still angry at Little Chris. Ricky attempts to get Mario and Little Chris on speaking terms again but it all ends in arguments as Lucy gets involved again.

Joey also announced that he would be opening his new shop, Fusey, before giving job interviews. The shop opening was a success. At the end of the series he revealed to Billie that he is going to propose to Sam in Dubai. Sam accepted the proposal and they returned for their engagement party.

== Cast ==
- Abi Clarke
- Billi Mucklow
- Billie Faiers
- Bobby Cole Norris
- Carol Wright
- Charlie King
- Chloe Sims
- Chris "Little Chris" Drake
- Dan Osborne
- Danni Park-Dempsey
- Danny Walia
- Darrell Privett
- Debbie Douglas
- Frankie Essex
- Gemma Collins
- Jack Bennewith
- James "Arg" Argent
- James "Diags" Bennewith
- James "Lockie" Lock
- Jamie Reed
- Jasmin Walia
- Jess Wright
- Joan Collins
- Joey Essex
- Kirk Norcross
- Lauren Pope
- Lucy Mecklenburgh
- Mario Falcone
- Mark Wright Snr
- Mick Norcross
- Patricia "Nanny Pat" Brooker
- Ricky Rayment
- Sam Faiers
- Tom Pearce

== Cast Departures ==
=== Mick Norcross ===
On 8 March 2013 it was announced that Mick Norcross had left the series and had banned cameras from filming in his nightclub, Sugar Hut following his departure feeling the show had given the club a negative reputation. Norcross only appeared in episode 1 of the series before departing following the airing of the fourth episode.

=== Kirk Norcross ===
On 21 March 2013, Kirk announced on Twitter that he had left the series due to the show changing too much.

=== Debbie Douglas ===
On 29 March 2013, Debbie announced her departure from the show on Twitter saying, "For everyone who has been asking me where I have been on recent episodes of TOWIE, I have made the decision to leave the show." Douglas only appeared during episodes 2–4 during this series.

=== Billi Mucklow ===
On 24 May 2013, it was announced that Billi had been axed from the show following shake-ups of the cast. Billi had appeared in the show from series 3–8, although after the departure best friend and former cast member Cara Kilbey, she didn't feature in the series as often. During her time on the show she had a brief fling with Kirk Norcross and then dated Tom Kilbey.

=== Danni-Park Dempsey ===
On 24 May 2013, it was confirmed that Danni had been axed from the show. Danni had appeared in the show from series 5–8. Following the departure of her best friend and former cast member Lydia Bright, Danni didn't feature in the show as often as she had previously. During her time on the show she briefly dated Charlie King.

=== Darrell Privett ===
On 24 May 2013, it was revealed that Darrell had been axed from the show. Darrell had featured in the show briefly from series 6–8. During his time on the show he briefly dated Chloe Sims but previously dated Lauren Pope off screen.

== Episodes ==
No. overall	No. in series	Title	Original release date	Duration	UK viewers
85	1	"Episode 1"	24 February 2013	50 minutes	1,470,000
Lauren fears that she could be pregnant. Mario celebrates his 25th birthday without Lucy, meanwhile newcomer Amy reveals that the only reason Mario hasn't cheated on her was because she turned him down. Bobby announces he wants a "gayby". Diags, Tom and Arg help Joey decorate his new shop. This was the last episode to feature Mick Norcross.
86	2	"Episode 2"	27 February 2013	50 minutes	1,128,000*
Gemma launches her new dieting club but is disappointed to hear that Arg and Jasmin are getting close. Lauren tells Kirk that she's taken a pregnancy test and it's negative. Lucy's upset continues as she tries to find out what really happened between Mario and Amy. Bobby finds out that Gemma disapproves of his plans for a "gayby".
87	3	"Episode 3"	3 March 2013	50 minutes	1,189,000*
Arg invites Jasmin round for dinner at Sam's where Sam and Jess question Arg's feelings towards Gemma. Joey holds job interviews for his new shop. Mario refuses to make the first move with Lucy after claiming he's not a cheat. Kirk gets emotional in front of Lauren.
88	4	"Episode 4"	6 March 2013	50 minutes	1,370,000
Joey breaks down during a conversation with Sam about his mum. Lucy finds out what really happened between Amy and Mario, then agrees to give the relationship another go. Little Chris has doubts over Mario. Gemma and Arg continue to flirt. This was the last episode to feature Debbie Douglas.
89	5	"Episode 5"	10 March 2013	50 minutes	1,274,000*
Jasmin's friend, Abi, takes an interest in Tom as Diags reveals that she was a former love interest of his. Joey visits his mum's grave with Sam. Mario and Lucy decide to take a break from Essex. After a meeting about the surrogacy, Bobby realises he's not ready financially to be a dad.
90	6	"Episode 6"	13 March 2013	50 minutes	1,234,000
Bobby and Charlie talk about their new business ideas. Ricky hosts a comedy night for everyone. Arg and Gemma discuss their situation with each other. Tom takes Abi fishing for their first date. Gemma and Bobby come to blows once again.
91	7	"Episode 7"	17 March 2013	50 minutes	1,239,000
Arg hosts a St Patrick's Day themed party arranged by Bobby and Charlie. Abi and Tom go on their second date. Danny and Jasmin confront Ricky over what he's been saying about them. Gemma goes to see a hypnotist. Joey, Diags, Kirk, Sam, Chloe and Frankie go indoor skydiving. This was the last episode to feature Kirk Norcross, Billi Mucklow and Danni-Park Dempsey.
92	8	"Episode 8"	20 March 2013	50 minutes	1,276,000
Gemma attempts to clear the air with Bobby and Charlie but it leads to another argument as Charlie sides with Gemma. Frankie's nervous as she cooks a meal for Joey and Sam. Joey sticks up for Danny and stands up to Ricky.
93	9	"Episode 9"	24 March 2013	50 minutes	949,000*
Joey finally opens his new shop, Fusey, with the help of Sam. Bobby gathers his friends to say goodbye to his car before putting it in a car crusher. Abi, Jasmin, James and Dan agree to go on a double date. Chloe gets emotional trying to protect Joey from getting hurt. Mario returns.
94	10	"Episode 10"	27 March 2013	50 minutes	1,366,000
Chloe confronts Sam about her arguments with Joey. Arg is thrown out of Gemma's dieting club. Bobby is forced to choose between Gemma and Charlie after she offers him a job. Dan, James, Abi and Jasmin go on their double date. Mario and Little Chris attempt to call a truce. Jess and Ricky discuss their future.
95	11	"Episode 11"	31 March 2013	50 minutes	1,526,000
Joey tells Billie of his plans to propose to Sam in Dubai. Abi's not happy with James after seeing him talking to Lauren. Dan and James arrange a five-a-side football match, making Arg a little over competitive. Bobby tries to impress Gemma on his first day working for her. Lucy returns.
96	12	"Episode 12"	3 April 2013	50 minutes	1,547,000
The day of the five-a-side football match arrives and Mario is there to support Arg's team leaving Little Chris and Ricky on the other team angry. Later, Little Chris and Ricky confront Mario and Lucy as they try to resolve their issues. This however leads to more arguments. Joey proposes to Sam in Dubai and she accepts. They then return to Essex for their engagement party.

== Reception ==
=== Ratings ===
Episode	Date	Official ITV2 rating	ITV2 weekly rank	Official ITV2+1 rating	Total ITV2 viewers
Episode 1	24 February	1,304,000	1	166,000	1,470,000
Episode 2	27 February	1,128,000	3		
Episode 3	3 March	1,189,000	2		
Episode 4	6 March	1,172,000	3	198,000	1,370,000
Episode 5	10 March	1,274,000	2		
Episode 6	13 March	1,044,000	3	190,000	1,234,000
Episode 7	17 March	1,075,000	2	164,000	1,239,000
Episode 8	20 March	1,076,000	2	200,000	1,276,000
Episode 9	24 March	0,949,000	3		
Episode 10	27 March	1,157,000	4	209,000	1,366,000
Episode 11	31 March	1,311,000	2	215,000	1,526,000
Episode 12	3 April	1,334,000	2	213,000	1,547,000
Series average		1,188,000	2	194,000	1,379,000
