= Shenfield High School =

Secondary school in Brentwood, Essex, England

Location
- Alexander Lane; Shenfield, Essex, CM15 8RY; England; 51°38′17″N 0°19′49″E

Information
- Type: Academy
- Motto: Learning for Life
- Established: 1962; 64 years ago
- Department for Education URN: 137877 Tables
- Ofsted: Reports
- Headteacher: C Costello
- Gender: Coeducational
- Age: 11 to 18
- Enrolment: 1,500
- Website: www.shenfield.essex.sch.uk

Shenfield High School is a coeducational 11-18 secondary school located in Shenfield, Essex, England. It has over 1200 students on roll, including 300 in the sixth form. It opened in 1962, celebrating its 50th anniversary in 2012. It converted to academy status in February 2012.

== School buildings ==
The school has a number of buildings, having one of the largest total areas of any school in the local area in order to cope with its 1,500 pupils. It has a total of 10 academic buildings, as well as a large sports centre, formerly owned by Brentwood Borough Council.

=== School grounds ===
The school itself has over 20 acres (81,000 m^{2}) of playing fields, which are used for breaktime recreation and physical education, as well as extracurricular activities. The school also has a gymnasium, 25 meter indoor swimming pool, a fitness room, 8 indoor rowing ergs and a 5 badminton court sports hall. As well as being host to local basketball club Champions Academy, EBL division 1 side the London Leopards also play fixtures in the sports hall on occasions. The school also has an expansive playground, which includes facilities for tennis nets to be erected for P.E. or club use. A large 3G astroturf pitch with associated changing and hospitality facilities was completed in 2010 and officially opened by England Women's football manager Hope Powell.

The school has a number of buildings as well as a large sports centre. An extension to one block was completed in September 2013 housing study facilities for the school's 6th Form as well as a new drama studio.

== Academic ==
Shenfield High School was rated as "Good" (Level 2) overall by OFSTED, when the previous inspection happened on 11 November and 12 November 2014. The previous OFSTED inspection took place on 23 September and 24 September 2009, at which point the overall performance was rated as "Satisfactory" (Level 3). The school's specialist status as a Business and Enterprise school has opened a wider range of business-oriented subjects within the school, including Business Studies (at GCSE, A-level and BTEC level 2 & 3), Accounting, Law and Economics. Many subjects are also encouraged to relate aspects of their teaching to business life. The schools' specialist status is confirmed until 2010.

=== Key Stage 3 ===
Key Stage 3 at Shenfield High School enjoys above average academic success, with an aggregate average score of 246 in 2005, with the Essex Local Authority average at 224, and national average at 217. This is a trend that has continued on from previous years. Students are examined in English, Science, and Maths at KS3 level, in the National Curriculum assessment exams. Around 80% of students passed each of these exams in 2005.

=== Key Stage 4 ===
At Key Stage 4, the schools' policy of splitting boys and girls only applies to English, Maths and Religious Education. All other subjects become mixed groups. In 2005, 58% of students obtained Level 2 (5 or more A* to C grades) in their GCSE examinations, only slightly above par with the Essex LA and national averages of 56%.

=== Key Stage 5 / sixth form ===
The sixth form at Shenfield High School has an average UCAS point score of 283.8 per student. The average score per examination entry is 70.2 across the AS Level, A Level, and GNVQ examinations offered by the school.

== Physical education and sport ==
Since 2004, the school has won six national titles (two for basketball, two for football and two for futsal) as well as numerous county titles in cricket, basketball, futsal and football.

The school offers a variety of other competitive sports including netball, swimming, rowing, badminton, cross-country running, athletics, table-tennis, trampolining and volleyball.

In 2011 Shenfield High School formed a football academy in conjunction with Colchester United Football Club. Pupils on the academy are trained for up to 2 hours a day by a UEFA qualified coach alongside their academic studies, as well as competing in the weekly county academy league and national competition framework.

== Notable former pupils ==
- Sarah Champion, television presenter and disc jockey
- Billie Faiers, star of The Only Way Is Essex
- Sam Faiers, star of The Only Way Is Essex
- Philip Hammond, MP, former Chancellor of the Exchequer
- Sarah Kane, playwright
- Ross Kemp, actor
- Frankie Kent, footballer for Heart of Midlothian
- Richard Madeley, television presenter
- Ferne McCann, star of The Only Way Is Essex
- Lucy Mecklenburgh, star of The Only Way Is Essex
- Russell Tovey, actor
