= The Only Way Is Essex series 7 =

The Only Way Is Essex
- Season 7
- No. of episodes: 10

Release
- Original network: ITV2
- Original release: 30 September – 31 October 2012

Series chronology
- ← Previous; Series 6 Next → Series 8

The seventh series of The Only Way Is Essex, a British semi-reality television programme, began airing on 30 September 2012 on ITV2. The series concluded on 31 October 2012 after ten episodes. Following the series, three festive special episodes aired from 2 December to 19 December 2012, including one live episode. The Only Way Is Essexmas special episode is included on the Series 7 DVD and Britbox, however for unknown reasons the other two specials were are not on this DVD. This was the first series to include brand new cast members and siblings Jasmin and Danny Walia. Jasmin had previously appeared during the Essexmas special of the first series auditioning for girl band LOLA.

This series also featured the return of original cast member Kirk Norcross following his departure at the end of the third series, as well as Mark Wright, who returned for the Essexmas special. The series also featured many cast departures including Cara and Tom Kilbey, and Lydia Bright. McFly band member Tom Fletcher also made a cameo appearance during this series when his brother-in-law Mario Falcone visited him seeking advice. This series heavily focused on the on/off relationship between Arg, and realising there's no way back for them, he launches a rescue mission for his PlayStation and his Kenny Award from her flat. It also includes the turbulent relationships of Jess and Ricky, Joey and Sam as well as Lucy and Mario whom eventually call their engagement off.

== Cast ==
- Billi Mucklow
- Billie Faiers
- Bobby Cole Norris
- Cara Kilbey
- Carol Wright
- Charlie King
- Chloe Sims
- Chris "Little Chris" Drake
- Danni Park-Dempsey
- Danny Walia
- Darrell Privett
- Debbie Douglas
- Frankie Essex
- Gemma Collins
- James "Arg" Argent
- James "Diags" Bennewith
- Jasmin Walia
- Jess Wright
- Joan Collins
- Joey Essex
- Kirk Norcross
- Lauren Pope
- Lucy Mecklenburgh
- Lydia Bright
- Mario Falcone
- Mark Wright
- Mark Wright Snr
- Mick Norcross
- Patricia "Nanny Pat" Brooker
- Ricky Rayment
- Sam Faiers
- Tom Kilbey
- Tom Pearce

== Episodes ==
No. overall	No. in series	Title	Original release date	Duration	UK viewers
72	1	"Episode 1"	30 September 2012	45 minutes	1,397,000
Whilst Danni and Charlie take their new relationship to the next step, Bobby is heartbroken to find out about the pair on social media. Newly single Gemma desperately tries to find out what Arg has been up to in Ibiza so hires some spies to investigate. Kirk returns to Essex to make amends with his dad, Mick, and Arg finds out that Gemma is back with Rami. Joey and Sam see a psychic in order to find out if they should move in together, meanwhile Gemma discovers Mario has gone behind her back and given Rami a warning about her, and Lydia feels that Tom K is the one.
73	2	"Episode 2"	3 October 2012	45 minutes	1,271,000
Chloe breaks down at the thought of being lonely for the rest of her life. Cara tells Tom K that she feels she’s not seeing him much since his relationship with Lydia started, and Bobby feels out of the loop when he confronts Danni over her new romance with Charlie. Kirk faces an awkward reunion with Lauren when it becomes clear there’s still bad blood between them, and Arg becomes desperate to remain friends with Gemma for the sake of getting his PlayStation back. Elsewhere Danni and Charlie hit the rocks after a conversation about Bobby.
74	3	"Episode 3"	7 October 2012	45 minutes	1,672.000
Lucy reveals her brand new look but is left disappointed by Mario’s negative reaction. Tom K receives a text from Arg explaining that he could easily have Lydia back, which ruffles Debbie’s feathers. Charlie tells Danni that he is still keeping his options open after she tells him she’s not ready for a relationship yet, Billie and Sam host trials for a girls netball team, and Arg and Tom K end up in a huge fist fight. Elsewhere Kirk gets a lesson in business from Mick, and Danni and Bobby’s discussion about Charlie ends in an almighty row.
75	4	"Episode 4"	10 October 2012	45 minutes	1,388,000
Fearing Lucy is being more negative than positive about their engagement, Mario seeks advice from his brother-in-law Tom Fletcher. Arg launches a mission to get back his Kenny Award from Gemma’s flat and uses Joey as bait. Determined to cheer Chloe up, Diags takes her out to a farm to take her mind off things. Up to no good, Joey joins Sam on a girl’s night at Gemma’s flat, whilst Mick holds auditions for new Sugar Hut Honeys, and Lucy finally opens up to Mario about her lack of trust in him causing him to fly off the handle.
76	5	"Episode 5"	14 October 2012	45 minutes	1,457,000
Mario apologises to Lucy for his behaviour but admits he proposed for all the wrong reasons, and Mick faces a dilemma when one of his Sugar Hut Honeys Jess confides in him about Mario persistently messaging her. Frankie fears Diags may have taken the date with Chloe too seriously, and Joey signs Arg up on a dating website. Elsewhere Tom K seeks engagement advice from Cara, and Jess tells Lucy about Mario’s messages, only for her to confess that she already knows about them – but Lucy quickly realises that it’s a different girl.
77	6	"Episode 6"	17 October 2012	45 minutes	1,444,000
Gemma defends herself when she hears that Mick has been slagging her off behind her back, and he has some defending of his own to do when he reassures Debbie that the Sugar Hut Honeys are for his business, not for his pleasure. Mario turns against Lydia when she tries to patch his relationship up with Lucy, whilst Joey sets Arg up on a blind date with Jasmin. Kirk decides to make big changes in his life and seeks help from Mick, and Ricky returns home with a big gesture for Jess as he gives her a key to his new house.
78	7	"Episode 7"	21 October 2012	45 minutes	1,606,000
Chloe begins her new career as a DJ and seeks lessons from Darrell, but as the pair grow closer it’s clear that Diags is jealous. Arg pours his heart out to Gemma before asking Jasmin out on another date, and Mario apologises to Lydia. Gemma is gobsmacked when Danni meets her out of the blue to lecture her for tarnishing the Sugar Hut’s name. Arg runs with fear after meeting Jasmin’s parents, whilst Joey and Kirk bump into Lydia and Lucy at a spa. The news reaches Mario and Tom K that their girls have been in a hot tub with the other boys leaving them livid, and Billi and Cara pick their christening outfit.
79	8	"Episode 8"	24 October 2012	45 minutes	1,341,000
Mario feels he’s letting everybody down one by one so visits his Mum for advice on how to fix things. Little Chris shows off his new girlfriend to his friends, but Ricky has fears that he’s about to lose his friend to her. Debbie hosts a night to raise money for breast cancer where Danni and Bobby clash once again, meanwhile Joey breaks down in tears after another argument with Sam. Elsewhere there’s trouble in paradise when Jess and Ricky meet to discuss where their relationship is going, and Gemma leaves a love confession on Arg’s phone.
80	9	"Episode 9"	28 October 2012	45 minutes	1,527,000
Chloe puts her friendship with Lauren at risk when she agrees to go on a date with Darrell, whilst Jess and Ricky’s meeting to clear the air isn’t successful. Heading out, Diags secretly texts Jasmin from Arg’s phone inviting her out – but things quickly turn awkward when she interrupts his and Gemma’s heart-to-heart. Elsewhere Joey believes he can run on water, and Mario agrees to sell Lucy’s engagement ring. On a James Bond themed night for the boys, Joey installs some spy devices and overhears Charlie confiding in Kirk about not ruling out a same sex relationship.
81	10	"Episode 10"	31 October 2012	45 minutes	1,308,000
Billie and Cara realise the stress of planning their christening is too much for them, and the netball girls face a thrashing when they take on England national ladies. Bobby’s feelings for Charlie are brought to the surface again when he confides in him over his sexuality, Ricky and Jess reunite, and Arg shaves his head. Ricky turns against Little Chris when he realises he isn’t fully supporting the reunion with Jess, meanwhile Mick bans Gemma from attending his Halloween night at the Sugar Hut. Elsewhere Bobby and Danni call a truce, and Kirk offers a friendship to Lauren.
82	11	"Episode 11"	2 December 2012	50 minutes	1,564,000
83	12	"TOWIE Live"	3 December 2012	50 minutes	1,291,000
84	13	"The Only Way Is Essexmas"	19 December 2012	60 minutes	1,153,000

== Reception ==
=== Ratings ===
Episode	Date	Official ITV2 rating	ITV2 weekly rank	Official ITV2+1 rating	Total ITV2 viewers
Episode 1	30 September 2012	1,168,000	2	229,000	1,397,000
Episode 2	3 October 2012	1,111,000	4	160,000	1,271,000
Episode 3	7 October 2012	1,472,000	3	200,000	1,672,000
Episode 4	10 October 2012	1,247,000	2	141,000	1,388,000
Episode 5	14 October 2012	1,217,000	3	240,000	1,457,000
Episode 6	17 October 2012	1,196,000	4	248,000	1,444,000
Episode 7	21 October 2012	1,362,000	3	244,000	1,606,000
Episode 8	24 October 2012	1,164,000	3	177,000	1,341,000
Episode 9	28 October 2012	1,366,000	2	161,000	1,527,000
Episode 10	31 October 2012	1,151,000	3	157,000	1,308,000
Episode 11	2 December 2012	1,319,000	2	245,000	1,564,000
TOWIE Live	3 December 2012	1,088,000	4	203,000	1,291,000
Essexmas	19 December 2012	1,983,000	2	170,000	1,153,000
Series average		1,245,000	3	196,000	1,441,000
