= The Only Way Is Essex series 9 =

The Only Way Is Essex
- Season 9
- No. of episodes: 12

Release
- Original network: ITV2
- Original release: 2 June – 10 July 2013

Series chronology
- ← Previous; Series 8 Next → Series 10

The ninth series of the British semi-reality television programme The Only Way Is Essex began airing on 2 June 2013 and included the 100th episode of the series which aired 12 June 2013. This was the first series not to feature both Mick Norcross and Debbie Douglas after their departure from the show during the previous series although Douglas made a cameo appearance in Episode 11. Both appeared in the show from series 2–8. It was also the first series not to include Kirk Norcross since he returned to the cast in series 7. On 12 April 2013, ahead of series, Lucy Mecklenburgh announced on Twitter that her relationship with Mario Falcone had ended. The series began with two The Only Way Is Marbs specials.

== Cast ==
- Abi Clarke
- Billie Faiers
- Bobby Cole Norris
- Carol Wright
- Charlie King
- Charlie Sims
- Chloe Sims
- Chris "Little Chris" Drake
- Dan Osborne
- Debbie Douglas
- Ferne McCann
- Frankie Essex
- Gemma Collins
- James "Arg" Argent
- James "Diags" Bennewith
- James "Lockie" Lock
- Jasmin Walia
- Jess Wright
- Joan Collins
- Joey Essex
- Lauren Pope
- Leah Wright
- Lucy Mecklenburgh
- Lydia Bright
- Mario Falcone
- Mark Wright Snr
- Patricia "Nanny Pat" Brooker
- Ricky Rayment
- Sam Faiers
- Tom Pearce

== Episodes ==
No. overall	No. in series	Title	Original release date	Duration	UK viewers
97	1	"The Only Way Is Marbs, Part 1"	2 June 2013	50 minutes	1,510,000*
As the group arrive in Marbs, Mario starts to enjoy single life. When Jasmin goes all out to impress him, Lucy gatecrashes the party. Wayne tries to charm Lauren by taking her on a date but gets angry when Chloe tags along. Arg gets chatting to a girl at the club but later finds out she's with Mario. Gemma ditches Bobby and Charlie K to join the others and is shocked when Arg opens up to her about his feelings, but she stands by the fact that she's over him. Ferne and Billie doubt Joey and Sam's relationship whilst Tom admits to fancying Lucy.
98	2	"The Only Way Is Marbs, Part 2"	5 June 2013	50 minutes	1,527,000
Mario asks new girlfriend Beth to come to Essex when they return home, and it's revealed that Lucy and Dan spent the night together. Arg is disappointed when Gemma's boyfriend Rami arrives in Marbs to see her. Ricky shocks Jess by asking her to move in with him but Lucy soon puts a spanner in the works with her negative thoughts. On a night out, Lucy and Mario clash before Lucy throws her drink at him, and after several arguments and both getting emotional over their relationship, Joey and Sam decide to take a break from each other.
99	3	"Episode 3"	9 June 2013	50 minutes	1,483,000
Back in Essex, Lucy goes on a date with Dan, meanwhile Mario plots to find out who told Lucy the truth about him cheating. Arg hosts a BBQ and plans to get closer to Gemma but isn't happy when Rami gets in the way. Ferne and Charlie S' relationship is on the rocks after they're caught in the middle of Sam and Joey's problems, and Lucy apologises to Little Chris. Billie and Ferne take Sam to a spa to brighten her mood whilst Joey confides in his family. Mario finally confesses to his mum about cheating on Lucy, and Carol finds it hard to let go of Jess.
100	4	"Episode 4"	12 June 2013	50 minutes	1,148,000*
Wayne apologises to Chloe in an attempt to impress Lauren, whilst Charlie K and Bobby's meeting with a potential client doesn't go to plan. After a day with the boys in the zoo, Joey agrees to meet Sam but he suggests having another week to make a decision about their relationship. Diags admits to wanting to be more than friends with Abi. Mario continues to investigate who told Lucy about his cheating and confronts Little Chris about it, but then Dan reveals to James that Ricky is the guilty one.
101	5	"Episode 5"	16 June 2013	50 minutes	1,152,000*
Billie and Chloe clash over their family situation, whilst Ferne and Charlie S' relationship remains rocky when Ferne takes sides with Sam and Charlie sides with Joey. Mario confronts Ricky but he denies telling Lucy about him cheating and blames everything on Little Chris. Dan reveals that he's going to be a dad to his ex-girlfriend. Diags takes Abi out on a romantic date in a rowboat in the middle of a lake in an attempt to impress her.
102	6	"Episode 6"	19 June 2013	50 minutes	1,355,000
Lucy meets up with Lydia to discuss the relationship with Dan and how it's now complicated with the father-to-be. Mario's accusations towards Ricky leave Jess confused over her feelings. Ferne and Charlie S' party causes tension between the Faiers family and the Essex/Sims family, but then Joey and Sam finally speak to each other but agree that the relationship is going nowhere with the constant arguing. Lucy gets emotional when she talks to Dan about their situation, and Ricky confesses to Jess about cheating.
103	7	"Episode 7"	23 June 2013	50 minutes	1,556,000
As Joey celebrates being officially single, James tries to charm Sam and asks her out for a drink leaving Joey feeling jealous and betrayed. Abi goes all out to impress Diags and cooks a romantic meal for him. Lucy tells Jess that she already knew about Ricky's cheating, but it was more than once. A shocked Jess plots to find out the truth about Ricky's infidelity but doesn't get the answers she wants when Ricky's revelations don't match Mario's version of events. Gemma tells Bobby that her relationship with Rami has ended.
104	8	"Episode 8"	26 June 2013	50 minutes	1,207,000
Jess remains upset over Ricky and is certain he's cheated more than once. Dan feels awkward after Lucy receives a text from Mario asking her to meet with him. Bobby tries to impress a man when him, Gemma and Charlie K hit Essex Pride. James attempts to charm Sam at the races and asks her out on a date with just the two of them. An angry Ferne clashes with Chloe after a confrontation with Joey over recent comments he's made towards her, leaving Charlie S in an awkward situation. Arg is convinced that Gemma wants him back.
105	9	"Episode 9"	30 June 2013	50 minutes	1,282,000*
Chloe enjoys her first day in her new job while Joey and Ferne clear the air at Charlie K's Michael Jackson themed party. Lucy agrees to meet Mario but it ends in arguments as Mario reveals Lucy made a sex tape with Dan in Marbella. James continues to annoy Joey as he pursues Sam. Chris confesses to Dan about telling Mario about the sex tape which causes bickering. As Dan and Lucy discuss the recent events, Dan announces he wants to meet with Mario. Ricky attempts to win Jess back by taking her to a spa.
106	10	"Episode 10"	3 July 2013	50 minutes	1,357,000
107	11	"Episode 11"	7 July 2013	50 minutes	1,276,000
108	12	"Episode 12"	10 July 2013	50 minutes	1,325,000

== Reception ==
=== Ratings ===
Episode	Date	Official ITV2 rating	ITV2 weekly rank	Official ITV2+1 rating	Total ITV2 viewers
Marbs 1	2 June 2013	1,510,000	1		
Marbs 2	5 June 2013	1,352,000	1	175,000	1,527,000
Episode 3	9 June 2013	1,322,000	3	161,000	1,483,000
Episode 4	12 June 2013	1,148,000	2		
Episode 5	16 June 2013	1,152,000	1		
Episode 6	19 June 2013	1,174,000	3	181,000	1,355,000
Episode 7	23 June 2013	1,383,000	1	173,000	1,556,000
Episode 8	26 June 2013	1,036,000	4	171,000	1,207,000
Episode 9	30 June 2013	1,282,000	2		
Episode 10	3 July 2013	1,116,000	1	241,000	1,357,000
Episode 11	7 July 2013	1,062,000	2	214,000	1,276,000
Episode 12	10 July 2013	1,121,000	1	204,000	1,325,000
Series average		1,222,000	2	190,000	1,386,000
