= The Only Way Is Essex series 16 =

The Only Way Is Essex
- Season 16
- No. of episodes: 12

Release
- Original network: ITVBe
- Original release: 4 October – 11 November 2015

Series chronology
- ← Previous; Series 15 Next → Series 17

The sixteenth series of the British semi-reality television programme The Only Way Is Essex was confirmed on 3 June 2015 when it was announced that it had renewed for at least a further six series, taking it up to 21 series. It is therefore the first series to be included in its current contract. The series launched on 4 October 2015 with two Marbella specials. After the launch of the new series, it was immediately followed by another one-off special "TOWIE: All Back to Essex", hosted by Mark Wright. Ahead of the series it was announced that cast member Gemma Collins had quit the show having appeared since the second series, however she later returned for the Essexmas special. This was also the final series to feature original cast member Lauren Pope, who quit mid-way through the series, Jess Wright and Ferne McCann who both announced their departures from the show ahead of the seventeenth series. This was also the final series to include Patricia "Nanny Pat" Brooker following her death. A Christmas special of the show aired on 16 December 2015 which featured the brief return of former cast members Gemma Collins, Lauren Goodger and Mario Falcone.

== Cast ==
- Billie Faiers
- Bobby Cole Norris
- Carol Wright
- Chloe Lewis
- Chloe Sims
- Dan Edgar
- Danni Armstrong
- Debbie Douglas
- Ferne McCann
- Fran Parman
- Gemma Collins
- Georgia Kousoulou
- Jess Wright
- Jake Hall
- James "Arg" Argent
- James "Diags" Bennewith
- James "Lockie" Lock
- Kate Wright
- Lauren Goodger
- Lauren Pope
- Lewis Bloor
- Liam Blackwell
- Lydia Bright
- Mario Falcone
- Mark Wright Snr.
- Mike Hassini
- Nicole Bass
- Patricia "Nanny Pat" Brooker
- Pete Wicks
- Tommy Mallet
- Vas Morgan

== Episodes ==
| No. overall | No. in series | Title | Original release date | Duration | UK viewers |
|---|---|---|---|---|---|
| 183 | 1 | "The Only Way Is Marbs, Part 1" | 4 October 2015 | 50 minutes | 941,000 |
With the group in Marbella to celebrate Jess's 30th birthday, Carol and Debbie get a bit carried away with the partying. Dan gets a shock when he sees his ex-girlfriend Kate out with the Essex girls but quickly attempts to clear the air with her leaving Lauren P confused as to where she stands. Chloe L and Ferne clash over new boy Mike, but which Essex girl has caught his eye? Danni puts her foot in it with Chloe S by telling her about Elliott's new girlfriend, and Arg is forced to step in when Vas and Lydia's ongoing feud continues. Elsewhere, Ferne and Jake team up against Chloe L.
| – | – | "TOWIE: All Back to Essex" | 4 October 2015 | 60 minutes | – |
Mark Wright and Denise van Outen host a live after party following the launch of the new series.
| 184 | 2 | "The Only Way Is Marbs, Part 2" | 7 October 2015 | 50 minutes | 1,048,000 |
Jake returns home to Essex after accusing Mike of flirting with Chloe L, but the girls fail to understand his problem as they aren't together anymore. A spark between Liam and Ferne grows as they agree to go on a date once they're back in England, whilst Lewis's ex-girlfriend turns up in Marbella. When Tommy invites Mike on a trip out, Jake and Lewis are both left raging as they fear he could crack on with their respective exes, leading them to question where Tommy's loyalty lies. Elsewhere, Arg fails his driving theory test once again.
| 185 | 3 | "Episode 3" | 11 October 2015 | 50 minutes | 1,176,000 |
Mike has some explaining to do when rumours fly around that he has kissed Nicole, whilst Liam is on hot pursuit of Ferne. Bobby channels his butch side by going to play rugby with the boys, and Ferne is caught in an awkward situation when Chloe L catches her talking about her leading to a head-to-head. With Mike and Nicole growing loser, she meets with Lewis to explain everything, who tries his best to control his temper. Elsewhere, Ferne tears up after personal comments from Chloe L, Tommy makes peace with Jake, and Debbie and Carol create a bucket list.
| 186 | 4 | "Episode 4" | 14 October 2015 | 50 minutes | 1,052,000 |
Diags is on a mission to get into Fran's good books, whilst Arg is left in a dilemma with Lydia following an innocent misunderstanding. Ferne gets the first date of her dreams from Liam as she's whisked away in a helicopter, leaving the girls in Essex jealous. Jake finally has a stand-off with Mike but is left fuming when Georgia and Lydia fail to take his side. Bobby and Chloe S host a bingo night, but there's drama when Lewis and Mike come to blows over their past feud and Nicole. Reality sets in for Nicole as she realises Lewis and Mike are chasing after her to score points.
| 187 | 5 | "Episode 5" | 18 October 2015 | 50 minutes | 1,122,000 |
Lydia fears that Diags is covering for Arg when more lies begin to surface. Dan tells Kate he wants to be with her again but she admits he would have to earn her trust again if he has any hope. Pete and Jess join Ferne and Liam on a date, but the atmosphere turns sour when Jess reveals she's not quite ready for a relationship yet. Debbie is drained from Arg and Lydia's problems, whilst Carol milks a cow for part of her bucket list. Lewis attacks Pete following a harsh opinion of his situation with Mike, and Vas bickers about the other group in Essex.
| 188 | 6 | "Episode 6" | 21 October 2015 | 50 minutes | 978,000 |
Dan desperately tries to think of ways to win round Kate and comes up with an idea involving Diags and Lockie. Liam is confused by the mixed signals given by Ferne, and Jess feels regret after the way she was with Pete during their date. Tommy is there for Arg as his recovery begins to slip, and Georgia fears that the situation could get worse without Lydia by his side. Elsewhere, Lewis takes Nicole to play basketball on their date but things immediately turn frosty as they discuss their past, and Vas agrees to be civil with Chloe L.
| 189 | 7 | "Episode 7" | 25 October 2015 | 50 minutes | 1,166,000 |
Danni and Lockie's relationship looks set to blossom again as news spreads that the pair ended up kissing, but things fizzle out between Ferne and Liam when she takes him to her neck of the woods. Lewis gives Nicole the green light to date Mike if she wants, whilst Jess takes Pete ice skating. Debbie begins to lose hope for Arg as she fears he will never change, and Lydia gives him a peace of her mind when he tries to win her round again. Elsewhere Ferne's attempt to let Liam down gently backfires when he accuses her of leading him on.
| 190 | 8 | "Episode 8" | 28 October 2015 | 50 minutes | 932,000 |
Tommy, Diags and Dan team up to take Arg's mind off Lydia and takes him camping, but they controversially don't invite Jake to minimise the agg. The girls fear that Chloe L and Jake have isolated themselves by not attending as many group events anymore, whilst Danni and Lockie continue to flirt. Nicole reels from Mike kissing Amy Childs but when he tries to apologise, there's a shock as Lewis takes his side accusing her of playing both boys. Dan takes Kate to the zoo on their date in an attempt to rekindle thing, and Danni agrees to let Lockie take her out again.
| 191 | 9 | "Episode 9" | 1 November 2015 | 50 minutes | 1,029,000 |
Vas makes it his mission to make amends with everybody he's crossed in Essex and begins with Chloe S, whilst Ferne feels disrespected when Liam shows off another girl in front of her. Bobby visits an animal psychic and is shocked by the readings, leaving Nicole and Pete questioning their latest romances. Debbie welcomes Vas with open arms, the tension grows between Jake and Mike, and Lydia is grateful for Tommy's support towards Arg. At the Halloween party, Ferne is confronted by Liam who is far from happy about the comments she made about him.
| 192 | 10 | "Episode 10" | 4 November 2015 | 50 minutes | 927,000 |
Vas makes it his mission to make amends with everybody he's crossed in Essex and begins with Chloe S, whilst Ferne feels disrespected when Liam shows off another girl in front of her. Bobby visits an animal psychic and is shocked by the readings, leaving Nicole and Pete questioning their latest romances. Debbie welcomes Vas with open arms, the tension grows between Jake and Mike, and Lydia is grateful for Tommy's support towards Arg. At the Halloween party, Ferne is confronted by Liam who is far from happy about the comments she made about him.
| 193 | 11 | "Episode 11" | 8 November 2015 | 50 minutes | 1,181,000 |
Liam prepares for his Devarly night at the Sugarhut in memory of his grandmother, he feels he needs to apologise to Ferne for his behaviour first. Danni and Lockie go on another date and agree to continue dating to see how things progress. There's more tension between Ferne and Chloe L following another big bust-up, and Arg recruits Liam for a big performance for his band. Elsewhere, Jake struggles to see why Ferne is giving his girlfriend so much agg, and Lewis has a confession to make as he tells Pete that he and Jess have kissed.
| 194 | 12 | "Episode 12" | 11 November 2015 | 50 minutes | 1,183,000 |
Jess has a lot of explaining to do when Pete demands to know the truth about her kiss with Lewis, but both have a very different version of events. Dan wins round Kate by revealing he has kept their old photo album from when they were together previously, gossip spreads about Lewis still trying to pursue Jess, and Danni and Lockie share another moment leaving them both questioning if they have a future together. Nanny Pat gets a royal 80th birthday party which has everybody in tears as the family reminisce, and Jess and Pete finally kiss.
| 195 | 13 | "The Only Way Is Essexmas" | 16 December 2015 | 60 minutes | 1,159,000 |
Some of the group take a trip to Scotland and Jess and Danni are happy to have a relaxing drama-free break for a change until Gemma urges Lockie and Pete to gate crash and get their respective women. Lewis attempts to make amends after feeling isolated by everybody in Essex, and Mario returns to give Nelly a Christmas gift. Danni isn't happy at Lockie returning to his old ways, whilst Arg isn't happy with Arg for grassing him up to Jess. Lauren G is back to give all important advice to Danni, and Arg promises Lydia that 2016 will be their year.

== Reception ==
=== Ratings ===
| Episode | Date | Official ITVBe rating | ITVBe weekly rank | ITVBe+1 viewers | Total ITVBe viewers |
|---|---|---|---|---|---|
| Marbs 1 | 4 October 2015 | 908,000 | 1 | 33,000 | 941,000 |
| Marbs 2 | 7 October 2015 | 981,000 | 2 | 67,000 | 1,048,000 |
| Episode 3 | 11 October 2015 | 1,084,000 | 1 | 92,000 | 1,176,000 |
| Episode 4 | 14 October 2015 | 998,000 | 2 | 54,000 | 1,052,000 |
| Episode 5 | 18 October 2015 | 1,045,000 | 1 | 77,000 | 1,122,000 |
| Episode 6 | 21 October 2015 | 917,000 | 2 | 61,000 | 978,000 |
| Episode 7 | 25 October 2015 | 1,094,000 | 1 | 72,000 | 1,166,000 |
| Episode 8 | 28 October 2015 | 846,000 | 2 | 86,000 | 932,000 |
| Episode 9 | 1 November 2015 | 952,000 | 1 | 77,000 | 1,029,000 |
| Episode 10 | 4 November 2015 | 867,000 | 2 | 60,000 | 927,000 |
| Episode 11 | 8 November 2015 | 1,078,000 | 1 | 103,000 | 1,181,000 |
| Episode 12 | 11 November 2015 | 1,132,000 | 1 | 51,000 | 1,183,000 |
| Essexmas | 16 December 2015 | 1,142,000 | 1 | 17,000 | 1,159,000 |
| Series average | | 1,003,000 | 1 | 65,000 | 1,069,000 |
