= The Only Way Is Essex series 10 =

The Only Way Is Essex
- Season 10
- No. of episodes: 12

Release
- Original network: ITV2
- Original release: 6 October – 13 November 2013

Series chronology
- ← Previous; Series 9 Next → Series 11

The tenth series of the British semi-reality television programme The Only Way Is Essex was confirmed on 10 July 2013 by cast member Bobby-Cole Norris on Twitter. The series began on 6 October 2013 with two The Only Way Is Vegas specials and was followed by a regular run of the series from 13 October 2013 until 13 November 2013. This was the last series to feature Joey Essex, with him making his final appearance in the series finale, and Lucy Mecklenburgh after she departed the series during the Christmas special at the end of the series. This series also marked the arrival of new cast member Elliott Wright, cousin of Mark and Jess Wright.

== Cast ==
- Abi Clarke
- Billie Faiers
- Bobby Cole Norris
- Carol Wright
- Charlie Sims
- Chloe Sims
- Chris "Little Chris" Drake
- Dan Osborne
- Danni Armstrong
- Debbie Douglas
- Elliott Wright
- Ferne McCann
- Frankie Essex
- Gemma Collins
- James "Arg" Argent
- James "Diags" Bennewith
- James "Lockie" Lock
- Jasmin Walia
- Jess Wright
- Joan Collins
- Joey Essex
- Lauren Pope
- Lewis Bloor
- Lucy Mecklenburgh
- Mario Falcone
- Mark Wright Snr
- Patricia "Nanny Pat" Brooker
- Ricky Rayment
- Sam Faiers
- Tom Pearce

== Episodes ==
No. overall	No. in series	Title	Original release date	Duration	UK viewers
109	1	"The Only Way Is Vegas, Part 1"	6 October 2013	60 minutes	1,450,000
The gang arrive in Vegas, but news of Charlie getting close to Jasmin is on Ferne's mind. A girl's night out to the strippers has big consequences for Ricky and Jess as their relationship comes to an end. With Lucy considering reuniting with Mario, she discovers he's recently kissed Lauren. Jess' cousin, Elliott arrives in Vegas to surprise her, and Joey and Arg get competitive at a casino.
110	2	"The Only Way Is Vegas, Part 2"	9 October 2013	60 minutes	1,202,000
Sam and Elliott's kiss has people talking, and Arg notices a connection between the pair during a meal together. Worried at how Joey would react, Arg questions Elliott over his future with Sam. Ferne forces Charlie to choose between herself and Jasmin, and it all ends in tears after she discovers he's seen her again. Ricky and Jess call a truce as he surprises her with a helicopter tour of Vegas, and news of Tom and Lucy getting together spreads, but she admits she's still in love with Mario.
111	3	"Episode 3"	13 October 2013	50 minutes	1,339,000*
Elliott makes his feelings known about Jess' decision to stay with Ricky causing a heated argument. Ferne confesses to spending the night with Charlie in Vegas, but claims she needs to forget about him and move on. Lucy and Tom's date is ruined when they bump into Lauren and Mario, and Lauren confronts Lucy over the rumours she's been spreading. As Elliott and Sam get closer, Joey reveals that she's been sending secret texts telling him she still loves him.
112	4	"Episode 4"	16 October 2013	50 minutes	1,379,000
Sam has some explaining to do when Elliott questions her about her texts with Joey. Ferne and Jasmin come face-to-face and attempt to settle their differences. Jess forces Ricky and Elliott to spend the day together to bond with each other. Ferne struggles to accept the relationship is over with Charlie as he walks out on her. At Little Chris' party, Gemma asks Bobby to move in with her, Tom clears the air with Mario over his new relationship with Lucy, and Mario and Lauren agree to just be friends.
113	5	"Episode 5"	20 October 2013	50 minutes	1,394,000
Arg and Diags go to a life drawing class in an attempt to meet girls. Joey and Sam meet up to discuss their situation, and as Sam admits she still has feelings for him, Joey tells her they both need to move on. Gemma is horrified to hear that Arg has been telling people that they slept together in Vegas and has no choice but to confront him leading to a big argument. Lucy feels anxious as Tom and Mario go to the pub together, and Sam tells Elliott she doesn't want a relationship with him.
114	6	"Episode 6"	23 October 2013	50 minutes	1,338,000
With Gemma still denying anything happening in Vegas, Arg uses Bobby to try to get to the truth. Sam bumps into her ex-boyfriend Lewis and invites him to her wine and cheese party. Ferne gets relationship advice from Mario, leaving Lucy confused over his intentions, and Tom angry that he's gotten into Lucy's head again. Elliott urges Sam to be more brutally honest with her feelings towards Joey, and Arg makes an unwelcome apology to Gemma.
115	7	"Episode 7"	27 October 2013	50 minutes	1,482,000
Abi and Jasmin become distant from each other leaving them both confused and upset. Ferne confesses to sleeping with Charlie again as Lewis admits he wants to get to know Sam again. James introduces his new girlfriend, Danielle. Bobby hosts a charity auction night, and Charlie is left hurt as Ferne wins her bid for Dan. Tom surprises Lucy by taking her for a romantic night, but as he asks her to be his girlfriend, she has her doubts. Sam is shocked when Joey turns up at the charity auction and wins the bid for her.
116	8	"Episode 8"	30 October 2013	50 minutes	1,330,000
Jasmin gets jealous as Dan prepares for his date with Ferne, whilst Charlie admits he's also hurt by the pair. Gemma tells Elliott that she's considering getting back together with Rami. Debbie returns to give Lucy some relationship advice, but puts more doubts in her mind over Tom. At the Halloween party there's clear tension between Elliott and Lewis, and Lauren tells Mario that they need to avoid each other to stop the awkwardness. Joey and Sam attempt to rekindle their relationship, but decide to take things step-by-step.
117	9	"Episode 9"	3 November 2013	50 minutes	1,334,000
Elliott and Lewis get competitive at 5-a-side bubble football. Lucy secretly confides in Mario over her feelings towards Tom, but as Tom catches them together, he decides to end things with Lucy. As Ferne and Dan go on a second date, she's not happy when he invites Danielle and James along too. Charlie announces that he's still sleeping with Ferne as Jasmin reveals she and Dan got cosy in Vegas. After the date ends in disaster, Ferne arrives at Arg's bonfire party to have a heated argument with Jasmin. Sam gives Joey an ultimatum.
118	10	"Episode 10"	6 November 2013	50 minutes	1,365,000
Despite Lewis urging Joey to give things another go with Sam, he tells her that they can't be together. Charlie visits Ferne's Mum to apologise for hurting her daughter. Mario isn't impressed when Lucy and Tom continue to spend time together and isn't happy to hear that Lola has been dyed pink. With Gemma and Rami back together, she asks Bobby to move out and give them their own space. Charlie finally admits his true feelings for Ferne and the pair rekindle their relationship.
119	11	"Episode 11"	10 November 2013	50 minutes	1,469,000
A flirty comment from Elliott towards Lucy angers Tom. Bobby and Gemma face an emotional goodbye as he moves out. Charlie and Ferne go on a double date with Mario and his new girlfriend, Pascal, who they are impressed with. Arg, Diags and Joey go to Popchoir in another attempt to meet girls. With Tom and Lucy happy on a date, they're rocked as Elliott makes an appearance and starts to flirt with Lucy giving Tom no choice but to start a fight. Meanwhile, Lewis takes Sam out on a friendly date.
120	12	"Episode 12"	13 November 2013	50 minutes	1,424,000
Lewis hosts an 80's themed party. Dan questions Charlie over one of his tweets about him, but it's Jasmin and Ferne who end up having the argument. Lucy finds it difficult as she comes face-to-face with Mario's new girlfriend, and doubts her feelings towards Tom. Following an honest discussion, Tom decides it's best to let Lucy go. Joey arrives to the party to say a final goodbye to Sam before leaving Essex. Elsewhere, Mario offers Lucy another chance to make their relationship work.
121	13	"The Only Way Is Essexmas"	11 December 2013	60 minutes	1,271,000

== Reception ==
=== Ratings ===
Episode	Date	Official ITV2 rating	ITV2 weekly rank	Official ITV2+1 rating	Total ITV2 viewers
Vegas 1	6 October 2013	1,290,000	2	160,000	1,450,000
Vegas 2	9 October 2013	1,053,000	3	149,000	1,202,000
Episode 3	13 October 2013	1,339,000	2		
Episode 4	16 October 2013	1,155,000	3	224,000	1,379,000
Episode 5	20 October 2013	1,212,000	2	182,000	1,394,000
Episode 6	23 October 2013	1,139,000	3	199,000	1,338,000
Episode 7	27 October 2013	1,285,000	2	197,000	1,482,000
Episode 8	30 October 2013	1,124,000	2	206,000	1,330,000
Episode 9	3 November 2013	1,088,000	3	246,000	1,334,000
Episode 10	6 November 2013	1,161,000	5	204,000	1,365,000
Episode 11	10 November 2013	1,199,000	4	270,000	1,469,000
Episode 12	13 November 2013	1,209,000	3	215,000	1,424,000
Essexmas	11 December 2013	1,103,000	3	168,000	1,271,000
Series average		1,188,000	3	205,000	1,379,000
