= The Only Way Is Essex series 14 =

The Only Way Is Essex
- Season 14
- No. of episodes: 13

Release
- Original network: ITVBe
- Original release: 22 February – 5 April 2015

Series chronology
- ← Previous; Series 13 Next → Series 15

The fourteenth series of the British semi-reality television programme The Only Way Is Essex was confirmed on 26 November 2014 when it had been announced that it had renewed for at least a further two series, the fourteenth and fifteenth. It is therefore the first series to be included in its current contract. The series launched on 22 February 2015 and was immediately followed by a one-off special "TOWIE: All Back to Essex" hosted by Mark Wright. It is the second series to feature on ITV's new channel ITVBe. It was the first series to include new cast members Dan Edgar, Jake Hall and Chloe Lewis, and the last to feature Charlie Sims, Dan Osborne, Jasmin Walia, Leah Wright and Ricky Rayment. Frankie Essex also made a brief return to the series having last appeared during the tenth series.

== Cast ==
- Billie Faiers
- Bobby Cole Norris
- Carol Wright
- Charlie Sims
- Chloe Lewis
- Chloe Sims
- Dan Edgar
- Dan Osborne
- Danni Armstrong
- Debbie Douglas
- Elliott Wright
- Ferne McCann
- Fran Parman
- Frankie Essex
- Gemma Collins
- Georgia Kousoulou
- Jake Hall
- James "Arg" Argent
- James "Diags" Bennewith
- James "Lockie" Lock
- Jasmin Walia
- Jess Wright
- Lauren Pope
- Leah Wright
- Lewis Bloor
- Lydia Bright
- Mario Falcone
- Patricia "Nanny Pat" Brooker
- Ricky Rayment
- Tommy Mallet
- Vas Morgan

== Episodes ==
No. overall	No. in series	Title	Original release date	Duration	UK viewers
158	1	"Episode 1"	22 February 2015	60 minutes	1,025,000
As the girls holiday in Tenerife, Ferne is already on edge over a recent fallout with Danni. Gemma apologises to Ferne for their previous dramas and vows to move forward with their friendship. Lydia is quick to jump to Ferne's defence after overhearing Danni talking about her. Following more rumours, Leah interferes with Chloe S and Elliott's drama. Back in Essex, Ferne and Danni finally come face-to-face and attempt to rebuild their friendship, whilst Gemma tries to set Jess up with new boy Dan Edgar. The night ends in disaster following another public brawl with Elliott and Chloe S.
–	–	"TOWIE: All Back to Essex"	22 February 2015	60 minutes	342,000
Mark Wright and Denise van Outen host a live after party following the launch of the new series.
159	2	"Episode 2"	25 February 2015	50 minutes	815,000
Chloe S laughs off the rumours Leah has been spreading about her until she finds out they were actually started from Lauren. Dan O celebrates the birth of his second daughter Ella, whilst Bobby is determined to find out who the snake in the group is. Lydia opens up about her recent dramas with Arg, before her attempt to make peace with Danni goes horribly wrong. News of Jess and Ricky's kiss before Christmas comes to light but both have different version of events. Lewis reveals he want to find a girlfriend and settle down, and Lauren feels left out by Chloe S and Vas.
160	3	"Episode 3"	1 March 2015	50 minutes	1,053,000
Arg is back in Essex following his stint in rehab and is determined to make it up to Lydia. Charlie and Chloe S's family drama continues and Ferne seems to be the root of the problems, whilst Vas rages at Lydia after feeling she is involved in everybody's arguments. Tommy and Georgia clash over their different opinions of Arg and Lydia, and Jess and Ricky's war escalates when she catches him bad mouthing her on social media. Chloe S isn't happy to find out someone's been stirring up rumours between her and Lauren, and Arg makes a big apology to Lydia.
161	4	"Episode 4"	4 March 2015	50 minutes	853,000
Georgia tears up when she realises she wants more attention from Tommy. Charlie fears his family issues won't progress until he receives an apology from Chloe S, and Danni attempt to make her see sense. Following the revelation that Vas tried it on with Jasmin, he breaks down confessing he will never be able to accept himself or his sexuality. Arg makes another apology to an emotional Gemma, whilst Chloe S agrees to make the first move with Charlie. Meanwhile the rift between Lydia and Debbie grows, and Ricky finally gives Jess some closure.
162	5	"Episode 5"	8 March 2015	50 minutes	1,028,000
Lydia and Debbie have a heart-to-heart and Debbie agrees to support her daughter more, and Chloe S finally makes the first step into fixing the family dramas between her and Charlie. Gemma hosts an international women's night. Elsewhere, Jake is introduced as the new boy of Essex, but as he sets his sights on Lauren, there's tension when his ex-girlfriend Chloe L arrives on the scene. Meanwhile Debbie finally sets some boundaries between herself and Arg, and Tommy woos Georgia with a romantic gesture.
163	6	"Episode 6"	11 March 2015	50 minutes	953,000
An isolated Chloe S meets up with Frankie for support, and is delighted to hear that Elliott is standing by her. Tommy and Lockie go to war as their club events fall on the same night, but who will have the most guests? With the revelation that Jake may have kissed Lauren, Chloe L turns her attention to Mario. Things get awkward between Georgia and Fran when they come face-to-face following weeks of ignoring each other, and Danni feels annoyed by Georgia and Tommy thinking they're the "power couple" of Essex. Elsewhere, Lauren lays into Jake when she hears he is denying they have kissed.
164	7	"Episode 7"	15 March 2015	50 minutes	1,143,000
Dan E takes it on himself to ask Jess out on a date; whilst Mario confesses his own relationship is on the rocks. Jake continues to deny kissing Lauren leaving Chloe L furious with him following a dramatic confrontation. Diags reveals that Tommy may have cheated on Georgia recently in Newcastle, and the rumours are quick to spread around Essex. Jake and Lauren clash when they're forced to discuss their encounter in front of Chloe L, and Tommy gets defensive when Georgia quizzes him about the night he supposedly cheated on her.
165	8	"Episode 8"	18 March 2015	50 minutes	948,000
Jake finally admits that he kissed Lauren and sends both her and Chloe L flowers to apologise. Georgia blames Fran for causing the troubles in her relationship despite Diags claiming Tommy is the one who's lying. Dan E takes Jess out for their second date, Mario tries his luck with Chloe L, and Ferne reveals that her and Charlie have split up. Ricky confesses that he's happy that Jess has moved on, whilst Chloe L believes her whole relationship with Jake was a sham. Diags, Fran, Tommy and Georgia end up in a public brawl when tempers flare between the couples.
166	9	"Episode 9"	22 March 2015	50 minutes	1,057,000
The rivalry between Jake and Mario escalates when both continue to bicker behind each other's backs, and Chloe L reveals to Ferne that she's still been getting grief off Jake to the point where she's had to block his number. Diags backtracks when Georgia confronts him over his night in Newcastle with Tommy, and she becomes more determined to get to the truth. Chloe S fears her feelings for Elliott are returning as the pair spend more time together, whilst Bobby and Gemma plan a singles night. Jake's night goes from bad to worse following run-ins with both Ferne and Mario.
167	10	"Episode 10"	25 March 2015	50 minutes	957,000
Elliott agrees to take a step back from Chloe S after the pair have another argument, but he later drops a bombshell on her when he reveals he's had an opportunity to leave Essex. Will he take it? Gemma gets emotional as she opens up about getting back with her ex-boyfriend, but her friends attempt to talk her out of it. Fran makes the first move and attempts to patch things up between herself and Georgia, and Lydia confronts Arg after hearing he could win her back at any time. Chloe L returns home and is immediately rocked when Jake tells her he wants her back.
168	11	"Episode 11"	29 March 2015	50 minutes	1,054,000
The latest rumour spreads around Essex that Jake and Lauren slept together, but as both deny it, Chloe L doesn't know what to believe. Chloe S is torn as she has a huge decision to make over Elliott and whether a new life in Marbella with him is for the best. As the group visit Wales, Danni has some harsh words to say about Lauren, and Jess and Dan E are the talk of the group. Bobby worries that Gemma doesn't know what she wants out of life, and Georgia worries that Arg and Lydia are getting too close. Jake tries proves himself to Chloe L, but has he won her round?
169	12	"Episode 12"	1 April 2015	50 minutes	1,007,000
Ferne disapproves of Chloe L not having her back during the rivalry between her and Jake, whilst Jess isn't happy with the way things are moving with Dan E. Lydia starts to have doubts over her relationship with Ben and starts to wonder whether Arg is actually the right man for her. Danni apologises to Lauren following her slur of words about her, meanwhile Jess tells Dan E that they're probably better off as friends. Ferne and Jake bicker again until she agrees not to interfere anymore, and Chloe S and Elliott try to reach a compromise.
170	13	"Episode 13"	5 April 2015	50 minutes	1,008,000
Jess starts to regret her decision to just be friends with Dan E as she admits she would find it difficult to see him with another girl. Arg takes advantage of Lydia being newly single and tries to win her round, but is left in a spin when she asks for a list of everybody he slept with when they were together. Elliott finally confesses his love for Chloe S and asks her to pack her bags and move to Marbella with him, whilst Jess and Dan E find themselves locking lips. Lydia and Arg give into temptation and get back together with each other, and Chloe L wants a break from Jake.

== Reception ==
=== Ratings ===
Episode	Date	Official ITVBe rating (millions)	ITVBe weekly rank	ITVBe+1 weekly rank	Total ITVBe viewers (millions)
Episode 1	22 February 2015	997,000	1	28,000	1,025,000
Episode 2	25 February 2015	815,000	2		
Episode 3	1 March 2015	1,012,000	1	41,000	1,053,000
Episode 4	4 March 2015	838,000	2	15,000	853,000
Episode 5	8 March 2015	978,000	1	50,000	1,028,000
Episode 6	11 March 2015	890,000	2	63,000	953,000
Episode 7	15 March 2015	1,082,000	1	61,000	1,143,000
Episode 8	18 March 2015	918,000	2	30,000	948,000
Episode 9	22 March 2015	1,023,000	1	34,000	1,057,000
Episode 10	25 March 2015	912,000	2	45,000	957,000
Episode 11	29 March 2015	1,019,000	1	35,000	1,054,000
Episode 12	1 April 2015	963,000	1	44,000	1,007,000
Episode 13	5 April 2015	946,000	2	62,000	1,008,000
Series average		953,000	1	42,000	992,000
