= The Only Way Is Essex series 13 =

The Only Way Is Essex
- Series 13
- No. of episodes: 11

Release
- Original network: ITVBe
- Original release: 8 October – 12 November 2014

Series chronology
- ← Previous; Series 12 Next → Series 14

The thirteenth series of the British semi-reality television programme The Only Way Is Essex was confirmed on 30 January 2014 when it had been announced that it had renewed for a further three series; the eleventh, twelfth and thirteenth. The series launched on 8 October 2014 with two The Only Way Is Ibiza specials. It was the first series to feature on ITV's new channel ITVBe, which also launched on 8 October 2014. The first episode of The Only Way Is Ibiza featured a live afterparty straight after the episode hosted by ex-cast member Mark Wright and narrator of the show Denise van Outen.

== Cast ==
- Billie Faiers
- Bobby Cole Norris
- Carol Wright
- Charlie Sims
- Chloe Sims
- Dan Osborne
- Danni Armstrong
- Debbie Douglas
- Elliott Wright
- Ferne McCann
- Fran Parman
- Gemma Collins
- Georgia Harrison
- Georgia Kousoulou
- James "Arg" Argent
- James "Diags" Bennewith
- James "Lockie" Lock
- Jasmin Walia
- Jess Wright
- Lauren Pope
- Leah Wright
- Lewis Bloor
- Lydia Bright
- Mario Falcone
- Patricia "Nanny Pat" Brooker
- Ricky Rayment
- Tom Pearce
- Tommy Mallet
- Vas Morgan

== Episodes ==
No. overall	No. in series	Title	Original release date	Duration	UK viewers
146	1	"The Only Way Is Ibiza, Part 1"	8 October 2014	60 minutes	924,000
The group arrive in Ibiza and Lauren receives an early shock when Vas explains that Lewis has been cheating on her leaving her no choice but to question him. Lewis confesses to cheating on different occasions causing Lauren to be heartbroken. Mario returns and Chloe is worried how it will affect her and Elliott's relationship but is surprised when the pair seem to be getting on. Georgia's friend George is revealed as Lewis's mystery fling, and Danni reveals her recent troubles including a miscarriage and feels Lockie hasn't been there for her when she's needed him.
–	–	"TOWIE: All Back to Essex"	8 October 2014	60 minutes	513,000
Mark Wright and Denise van Outen host a live after party following the launch of the new series.
147	2	"The Only Way Is Ibiza, Part 2"	12 October 2014	60 minutes	1,093,000
Mario gives Ferne advice over Chloe telling her she needs to sort the differences out or risk losing Charlie. Georgia gives Tommy rules for their new romance but he breaks them immediately as he's rude to her in front of his friends. George and Lauren team up discuss Lewis, but as George gets closer to Tom, it's revealed that she might not be fully over Lewis yet. Elsewhere, Danni and James meet up and arrange to work on their relationship, and Ferne and Elliott clash once again, and it's Mario and Jess left picking up the pieces.
148	3	"Episode 3"	15 October 2014	50 minutes	916,000
George tells Tom he will have to wait at least three months before she will get into bed with him, but he admits to enjoying the challenge, whilst Tommy takes Georgia for some pie and mash for their first date. Chloe and Elliott's relationship problems are the talk of Essex as both feel as though they're pushing each other away. Ferne revels in Elliott's misfortune as he goes to Jess for some advice. Lockie arranges for himself and Danni to see a relationship counsellor, and Lewis attempts to apologise to Lauren. Elliott and Chloe agree to take a break from each other.
149	4	"Episode 4"	19 October 2014	50 minutes	1,180,000
Chloe confides in Gemma over her relationship problems and is shocked to hear about Elliott's single attitude. Georgia finds out that Jasmin has been stirring things between her and Tommy in a bid to split them up causing the pair to have a blazing row. Tom is far from impressed when George meets Lewis to hear his apology, whilst Chloe breaks down because of the lack of support from her brother. Elliott starts to wonder whether taking a break from Chloe was the right decision, and Lockie and Danni visit a relationship counsellor in an attempt to put things right between them.
150	5	"Episode 5"	22 October 2014	50 minutes	1,027,000
Elliott admits he still wants to be with Chloe and regrets agreeing to go on a break with her, and Chloe feels she's been portrayed as the bad one in the relationship. Lewis interrupts the girl's day at the theme park causing Fran to storm off upset following another argument. Tom tries to convince George that Lewis is playing a sly game with her. Lydia struggles with Arg feeling she's more of a mother to him rather than a girlfriend, and as Chloe and Elliott meet up to discuss their future, Elliott confesses to having another girl sleeping in his bed leaving Chloe no choice but to end it.
151	6	"Episode 6"	26 October 2014	50 minutes	1,118,000
With the real reason as to why Chloe and Elliott split up spreading around Essex, everyone has different opinions. Gemma goes out of her way to confront Elliott over the way he's been treating Chloe but he implies that they are back together. Fran loses her temper with Diags, and Bobby hosts an "Essex's Strongest Man Competition". Jess sides with Elliott as the rumours continue to mount, and Gemma questions Chloe over her feelings towards him still. Elliott receives abuse from Chloe after she finds out he's been revealing their private life, and Dan is announced as the strongest man.
152	7	"Episode 7"	29 October 2014	50 minutes	1,077,000
Lauren decides to make an effort and rekindle her friendship with Chloe and is delighted when she agrees to discuss everything with her, and Gemma is determined to do something about her weight after hearing more abusive comments. George and Tom agree that their relationship is going nowhere, whilst Fran ends things with Diags after finding pictures of girls on his phone. As Ricky plans his future with Jess, he's unaware that she has been sent messages of Ricky flirting with another girl. Deciding to question him about it, Jess explodes and ends the relationship.
153	8	"Episode 8"	2 November 2014	50 minutes	1,169,000
Diags and Fran work on their relationship, and Jess exposes more of Ricky's lies when he turns things around and tries to blame her for his reckless behaviour. Chloe and Lauren agree to put the past behind them and attempt to move on with their lives and be friends, then Chloe has a run-in with Elliott where they agree to cut all contact. Lewis and Fran's ongoing rivalry continues and Tom and Diags have no choice but to get involved to try and fix things. Elsewhere, Tommy and Georgia make their relationship official, and Jess and Ricky have another public row during a Halloween party.
154	9	"Episode 9"	5 November 2014	50 minutes	1,071,000
Ricky's mum Jan returns to Essex for her son to push him into apologising to Jess, but she comes face-to-face with Carol and the pair clash about their children. Fran is determined to have it out with Lewis after finding out more things he has said about her and her relationship with Diags. Elliott surprises Chloe on her birthday by unexpectedly turning up with presents and flowers but she feels it's too little too late as they could never go back to how things were before. Jess agrees to meet Ricky where he finally apologises for the way he's treated her, but will she take him back?
155	10	"Episode 10"	9 November 2014	50 minutes	1,359,000
After hearing about Gemma and Ferne's fallout, the girls of Essex are torn over who's in the wrong. Ricky writes a letter of apology to Carol after there's a clear rivalry between the Rayments and the Wrights. Danni feels she needs to spice things up in her relationship with Lockie so plans a night he will never forget. Georgia and Tommy's relationship hits an obstacle as they both take different sides between Fran and Lewis' ongoing drama. Elsewhere, Carol visits Ricky to discuss his and Jess' breakup, and Ferne faces the wrath of Gemma as their feud explodes.
156	11	"Episode 11"	12 November 2014	50 minutes	1,103,000
Bobby arranges a charity night for his mum. Ferne and Gemma finally make up after their argument but Danni doesn't agree with their friendship branding it fake. Ricky goes to Lydia and Debbie for support but is disappointed when they stick up for Jess and vent their anger towards him. As Ricky jets off to Florida, revelations begin to spill as Jess reveals that Mario has been flirting with her since her break up, and both Chloe and Lauren reveal that he's tried it on with them recently also. The girls receive a shock when the boys get on stage and strip for them.
156	11	"Episode 11"	12 November 2014	50 minutes	1,103,000
Bobby arranges a charity night for his mum. Ferne and Gemma finally make up after their argument but Danni doesn't agree with their friendship branding it fake. Ricky goes to Lydia and Debbie for support but is disappointed when they stick up for Jess and vent their anger towards him. As Ricky jets off to Florida, revelations begin to spill as Jess reveals that Mario has been flirting with her since her break up, and both Chloe and Lauren reveal that he's tried it on with them recently also. The girls receive a shock when the boys get on stage and strip for them.
157	12	"The Only Way Is Essexmas"	10 December 2014	60 minutes	1,061,000

== Ratings ==
Episode	Date	ITVBe weekly rank	Official ITVBe rating (millions)
Ibiza 1	8 October 2014	2	924,000
Ibiza 2	12 October 2014	1	1,093,000
Episode 3	15 October 2014	2	916,000
Episode 4	19 October 2014	1	1,180,000
Episode 5	22 October 2014	2	1,027,000
Episode 6	26 October 2014	1	1,118,000
Episode 7	29 October 2014	2	1,077,000
Episode 8	2 November 2014	1	1,169,000
Episode 9	5 November 2014	2	1,071,000
Episode 10	9 November 2014	1	1,359,000
Episode 11	12 November 2014	1	1,103,000
Essexmas	10 December 2014	1	1,061,000
Series average		1	1,092,000
