= The Only Way Is Essex series 12 =

The Only Way Is Essex
- Season 12
- No. of episodes: 12

Release
- Original network: ITV2
- Original release: 22 June – 30 July 2014

Series chronology
- ← Previous; Series 11 Next → Series 13

The twelfth series of the British semi-reality television programme The Only Way Is Essex was confirmed on 30 January 2014 when it had been announced that it had renewed for a further three series, the eleventh, twelfth and thirteenth. The series began on 22 June 2014 and started with two The Only Way Is Marbs specials. This series focused on the blossoming relationship between Chloe and Elliott, Bobby ending the romance between Harry after finding out he's still seeing his ex-boyfriend, the rivalry between Chloe and Ferne after cheating rumours came to light, and Arg's attempts to win back Lydia. This was the last series to feature on ITV2 before moving to ITVBe later that year.

== Cast ==
- Billie Faiers
- Bobby Cole Norris
- Carol Wright
- Charlie Sims
- Chloe Sims
- Dan Osborne
- Danni Armstrong
- Debbie Douglas
- Elliott Wright
- Ferne McCann
- Fran Parman
- Gemma Collins
- Georgia Kousoulou
- Grace Andrews
- Harry Derbidge
- James "Arg" Argent
- James "Diags" Bennewith
- James "Lockie" Lock
- Jasmin Walia
- Jess Wright
- Joan Collins
- Lauren Pope
- Leah Wright
- Lewis Bloor
- Lydia Bright
- Patricia "Nanny Pat" Brooker
- Ricky Rayment
- Tom Pearce
- Vas Morgan

== Episodes ==
| No. overall | No. in series | Title | Original release date | Duration | UK viewers |
|---|---|---|---|---|---|
| 134 | 1 | "The Only Way Is Marbs, Part 1" | 22 June 2014 | 60 minutes | 1,582,000 |
The group arrive in Marbella, and Bobby and Harry's new relationship is hot topic. The tension between Chloe and Lauren increases as old friend Vas gets involved. Gemma puts a spanner in the works as she reveals that Harry went to Tenerife to see his ex-boyfriend. Charlie comes across some footage of Ferne with another man in Vegas and immediately doubts their relationship. Grace and Tom get close but fears he may be looking elsewhere. Bobby is horrified when he goes through Harry's phone and sees some messages, and Lydia and Arg reminisce.
| 135 | 2 | "The Only Way Is Marbs, Part 2" | 25 June 2014 | 60 minutes | 1,433,000 |
Bobby is determined to find out what really happened between Harry and his ex-boyfriend in Tenerife and questions Gemma further. As more secrets are revealed, Harry accuses Gemma of lying to sabotage his relationship. Dan finds out that Jasmin has been back stabbing him so angrily confronts her causing a heated argument. Ferne clashes with both Chloe and Fran as they defend Charlie, and Harry finally confesses to cheating on Bobby before returning to Essex. Charlie agrees to work on his relationship with Ferne, whilst Elliott and Chloe discuss their future.
| 136 | 3 | "Episode 3" | 29 June 2014 | 50 minutes | 1,608,000 |
Arg hopes he and Lydia can be friends again and confides in Debbie over his feelings, but Lydia feels he's only going to her Mum to worm his way back into her life. Georgia reveals she stayed at Dan's in Marbella but slept on the sofa leaving Jasmin upset that her friend would go behind her back. Gemma continues to meddle in Bobby's life and phones Harry's ex-boyfriend, and there are consequences as she investigates further. Ferne reaches out and apologises to Chloe but she refuses to forgive her, and Grace and Tom get closer. Elsewhere, Georgia and Jasmin clash over Dan.
| 137 | 4 | "Episode 4" | 2 July 2014 | 50 minutes | 1,454,000 |
As Charlie stresses over the opening of his deli, Ferne worries her feud with Chloe is causing more pressure for him. Danni feels that Gemma needs to stop getting involved in Bobby's love life, and urges Harry to fight for his man. Lydia reveals her concerns to Debbie over her friendship with Arg and makes it clear that she and Arg will just be remaining friends. Tom takes Grace on a date, whilst Lewis takes Lauren for some fish and chips. Harry interrupts Bobby's movie night with Gemma to confess all of his mistakes with his ex-boyfriend, but will Bobby forgive him?
| 138 | 5 | "Episode 5" | 6 July 2014 | 50 minutes | 1,556,000 |
The tension between Chloe and Ferne increases and Charlie admits he's had enough of arguments in his family. Harry and Bobby spend the day together in an attempt to make amends for recent situations. Lewis asks for Vas' approval to ask Lauren out on a date and admits he feels awkward around her. As Jess moves into her new home, she explains to her friends that she wishes that Ricky was moving in with her. Charlie tells Chloe that he will be with Ferne regardless of her opinions towards her, and asks Ferne to not cause trouble between him and his sister.
| 139 | 6 | "Episode 6" | 9 July 2014 | 50 minutes | 1,515,000 |
After a discussion with her family, Jess worries about Ricky's commitment in their relationship and fears they might not have a future together. Chloe hears rumours that Ferne has cheated on Charlie once again and reveals she will never forgive her, whilst Elliott exposes another secret as it comes to light she's made a pass at him. Tom backs off from Grace after finding out she's gone back to her ex-boyfriend, whilst Gemma and Harry have an angry confrontation over each other's lies. Grace feels let down by Fran and Georgia and is quick to pull them up on it.
| 140 | 7 | "Episode 7" | 13 July 2014 | 50 minutes | 1,580,000 |
Grace has a lot of explaining to do when Tom questions her about her ex-boyfriend. Bobby finally ends the relationship with a heartbroken Harry but when Gemma goes to comfort Harry, Bobby is angry at where her loyalties lie. Chloe is annoyed at the rift Ferne has caused between her and her brother, and Elliott tries to put things right for the Sims. Elsewhere, Lydia becomes Arg's driving instructor, and Lauren and Vas host a fashion show where Georgia tries to make amends with Grace. Elliott's attempts at fixing problems backfires as he ends up in another argument with Ferne.
| 141 | 8 | "Episode 8" | 16 July 2014 | 50 minutes | 1,427,000 |
Fran is confused as Grace refuses to make amends with her due to the lack of trust. Gemma and Bobby make peace and team up to urge Ferne to sort her issue out with Chloe for Charlie's sake. Lydia and Arg revisit the past, but when he asks her to be his plus-one at Leah's wedding, Ricky feels she may be leading him on. Diags isn't happy when Lewis takes Grace's side of the argument over Fran's, and Danni is far from impressed to discover Vas has been tweeting about her. As Fran tries to fix things with Grace, she's shocked when she accuses her of cheating on Diags.
| 142 | 9 | "Episode 9" | 20 July 2014 | 50 minutes | 1,722,000 |
When Arg and Lydia wake up next to each other, Arg is overjoyed and is quick to spread his happiness around Essex by telling everyone. Elliott and Chloe decide to make their relationship official and announce they're looking to buy a house together already. Elsewhere, Charlie takes Ferne camping, and Lewis and Diags try to clear the air. Vas and Danni clash over their recent back stabbing causing Vas to get upset, and Gemma breaks down after finding out about Arg and Lydia's night together. Shocked by the rumour Grace has started, Georgia ends their friendship.
| 143 | 10 | "Episode 10" | 23 July 2014 | 50 minutes | 1,542,000 |
Lauren isn't impressed that Lewis has told everyone that they slept together, whilst Lydia starts to have second thoughts about getting so close to Arg again. Ferne goes on a mission to set Gemma up on a double date but she ends up horrified as she comes face-to-face with someone she kissed in Vegas. As the Wright's attend Leah's wedding in Spain, Ricky reveals he'd like to marry Jess in the near future. Vas opens up to Danni about his past leaving him in an emotional state. Elsewhere, there's trouble in paradise as Lydia tells Arg not to tell everyone about their private life.
| 144 | 11 | "Episode 11" | 27 July 2014 | 50 minutes | 1,873,000 |
Another cheating allegation against Arg from the past comes to light bringing back bad memories for Lydia, but as she promises not to go anywhere near him again, she questions Debbie's loyalties when she can't see the bad in him still. With the Wright's at war following arguments at the wedding, Carol and Jess are quick to point the finger at Arg for causing them. There's tension between Lauren and Danni which leads to a confrontation between the pair. Meanwhile Elliott sticks up for Arg when Jess tells him he should take full responsibility for the drama in her family.
| 145 | 12 | "Episode 12" | 30 July 2014 | 50 minutes | 1,684,000 |
Carol makes it clear she isn't happy by comments made by Chloe regarding their family situation, whilst Jess and Leah go out of their way to resolve the matter. Grace refuses to back down as Fran continues to call her a liar, and Georgia admits she's sick of the pair bickering. Elsewhere, Chloe and Ferne finally put their rivalry behind them and agree to be friends again, whilst Bobby and Harry remember the good times they shared together. Arg makes a grand gesture to Lydia and confesses his love her, and he's delighted at the mutual feeling as they agree to take things slowly.

== Reception ==
=== Ratings ===
| Episode | Date | Official ITV2 rating (millions) | ITV2 weekly rank | Official ITV2+1 rating (millions) | Total ITV2 viewers (millions) |
|---|---|---|---|---|---|
| Marbs 1 | 22 June 2014 | 1,421,000 | 1 | 161,000 | 1,582,000 |
| Marbs 2 | 25 June 2014 | 1,244,000 | 2 | 189,000 | 1,433,000 |
| Episode 3 | 29 June 2014 | 1,319,000 | 1 | 289,000 | 1,608,000 |
| Episode 4 | 2 July 2014 | 1,201,000 | 2 | 253,000 | 1,454,000 |
| Episode 5 | 6 July 2014 | 1,347,000 | 1 | 209,000 | 1,556,000 |
| Episode 6 | 9 July 2014 | 1,329,000 | 1 | 186,000 | 1,515,000 |
| Episode 7 | 13 July 2014 | 1,301,000 | 2 | 279,000 | 1,580,000 |
| Episode 8 | 16 July 2014 | 1,208,000 | 2 | 219,000 | 1,427,000 |
| Episode 9 | 20 July 2014 | 1,544,000 | 1 | 178,000 | 1,722,000 |
| Episode 10 | 23 July 2014 | 1,306,000 | 2 | 236,000 | 1,542,000 |
| Episode 11 | 27 July 2014 | 1,654,000 | 1 | 219,000 | 1,873,000 |
| Episode 12 | 30 July 2014 | 1,475,000 | 1 | 209,000 | 1,684,000 |
| Series average | | 1,362,000 | 1 | 219,000 | 1,581,000 |
