= The Only Way Is Essex series 15 =

The Only Way Is Essex
- Season 15
- No. of episodes: 12

Release
- Original network: ITVBe
- Original release: 14 June – 22 July 2015

Series chronology
- ← Previous; Series 14 Next → Series 16

The fifteenth series of the British semi-reality television programme The Only Way Is Essex was confirmed on 26 November 2014 when it had been announced that it had renewed for at least a further two series, the fourteenth and fifteenth. The series launched on 14 June 2015 with two Marbella specials. After the launch of the new series, it will be immediately followed by another one-off special "TOWIE: All Back to Essex" hosted by Mark Wright. It is the third series to feature on ITV's new channel ITVBe. As well as confirming the new launch date, it was confirmed that ITV had renewed their contract keeping the show for a further six series, taking it to Series 21. Ahead of the series it was announced that cast member Ricky Rayment had taken a short break from the show but would be back, however he did not return. It was also confirmed that Mario Falcone had been suspended from the show for the second time, this time after promoting slimming pills on social media. He returned during the fourth episode. This was the final series to feature long-running cast member Gemma Collins until her brief return for the Essexmas special, and first to include new cast member Pete Wicks.

== Cast ==
- Billie Faiers
- Bobby Cole Norris
- Carol Wright
- Chloe Sims
- Chloe Lewis
- Dan Edgar
- Danni Armstrong
- Debbie Douglas
- Elliott Wright
- Ferne McCann
- Fran Parman
- Gemma Collins
- Georgia Kousoulou
- Jake Hall
- James "Arg" Argent
- James "Diags" Bennewith
- James "Lockie" Lock
- Jess Wright
- Lauren Pope
- Lewis Bloor
- Lydia Bright
- Mario Falcone
- Patricia "Nanny Pat" Brooker
- Pete Wicks
- Tommy Mallet
- Vas Morgan

== Episodes ==
No. overall	No. in series	Title	Original release date	Duration	UK viewers
171	1	"The Only Way Is Marbs, Part 1"	14 June 2015	50 minutes	945,000
The group arrive in Marbella, but there's still shockwaves from Chloe S and Elliott's split. Danni confesses that her relationship is on the rocks and fears that there's no way back for her and Lockie, but she's completely unaware he is planning to propose. Pete is introduced to the gang and immediately takes a shine to both Jess and Ferne who battle for his attention. Jake gets the hump when he realises Chloe L and Pete have a past, and Arg and Lydia reminisce. With Lockie in two minds whether to pop the question, Danni puts him out of his misery by ending their turbulent relationship.
–	–	"TOWIE: All Back to Essex"	14 June 2015	60 minutes	–
Mark Wright and Denise van Outen host a live after party following the launch of the new series.
172	2	"The Only Way Is Marbs, Part 2"	17 June 2015	50 minutes	840,000
Vas arrives in Marbella but there's animosity when he refuses to share a villa with Gemma and Bobby. Danni is shaken when she discovers Lockie had planned to propose and seeks comfort from Chloe S, whilst Chloe L finally agrees to be Jake's girlfriend. Pete reveals that Jess is more his type than the other girls but Dan warns him off her, and Georgia is in an awkward position when the girls think Tommy isn't treating her right. Elliott feels Danni has been stirring things between him and Chloe S, and an almighty row erupts when Lockie jumps to her defence.
173	3	"Episode 3"	21 June 2015	50 minutes	981,000
Debbie hosts a memorial service for Lewis's dog Alfie and Georgia's cat Snowy, but it's Dan who's the one with grief when Jess questions his motives for warning Pete off her. Danni breaks down as she tells Lockie that she would rather end their relationship altogether rather than be on a break. Tommy lays into Ferne after feeling she's involving herself in his relationship too much, and Gemma and Vas fail to clear the air. Jake and Chloe L hit the rocks when he makes it clear he isn't happy with who she is following on social media.
174	4	"Episode 4"	24 June 2015	50 minutes	820,000
Debbie hosts a memorial service for Lewis's dog Alfie and Georgia's cat Snowy, but it's Dan who's the one with grief when Jess questions his motives for warning Pete off her. Danni breaks down as she tells Lockie that she would rather end their relationship altogether rather than be on a break. Tommy lays into Ferne after feeling she's involving herself in his relationship too much, and Gemma and Vas fail to clear the air. Jake and Chloe L hit the rocks when he makes it clear he isn't happy with who she is following on social media.
175	5	"Episode 5"	28 June 2015	50 minutes	1,023,000
Lockie brands Danni a hypocrite when she criticises his posts about nights out on social media, and he goes to counselling to sort out his anger. Jake plans to sort things out with Chloe L once and for all but Vas drips poison in his ear. Meanwhile Dan uses a group activity in order to get closer to Lauren, and Ferne and the girls plot to take over Essex by becoming feminists, with their first venture being going clubbing without any makeup. Pete picks up on tension between him and Tommy, and Georgia rages when she finds out Ferne has called her a doormat.
176	6	"Episode 6"	1 July 2015	50 minutes	979,000
Jess feels betrayed by Lauren for agreeing to go on a date with Dan, and believes the false rumours that they have been secretly meeting behind her back, whilst Gemma also announced her disappointment with Lauren for talking about her behind her back. Pete is annoyed by Lewis for involving himself in the argument between him and Tommy, and Lydia urges the boys to speak to Jake about his behaviour towards Chloe L. Gemma plots to get rid of the GC tag and holds a ceremony to put her alter ego to rest.
177	7	"Episode 7"	5 July 2015	50 minutes	792,000
As the group gather to play rounders, there's clear tension between Arg and Lydia following an earlier argument where she found out he had been drinking again. Jake meets Chloe L at the airport with flowers and suggests they move into together, but isn't happy when she admits they aren't at that stage yet. Lauren is far from impressed by Gemma's personal comments about her and when the pair come face-to-face, they end up having a huge bust up. Bobby's attempt at making peace backfires when Gemma turns on him instead.
178	8	"Episode 8"	8 July 2015	50 minutes	963,000
Gemma is still upset that Bobby didn't stick up for her against Vas and Lauren, but Bobby realises that she wouldn't have reacted the way she did if they had an equal friendship. With rumours flying around that Lockie kissed Lauren's friend Verity, they are all unaware that it was actually Pete she kissed. Arg surprises Lydia on their seven year anniversary, and Lockie trades the engagement ring in to pay for a holiday to Vegas. Elsewhere, Danni breaks down when she sees Verity flirting with Lockie, and Bobby is drained by the situation with Gemma.
179	9	"Episode 9"	12 July 2015	50 minutes	776,000
The girls of Essex take a stand against Verity to defend Danni, but are all unaware of the true events. An isolated Lauren tears up in front of Mario and she's left confused by Jess telling her one thing, and another to the girls. Chloe L reaches breaking point with Jake after hearing he has a past with Verity and kissed her when they were together. Jess makes an attempt to put her differences aside with Lauren but it only causes more animosity when neither girl admits that they were in the wrong. Elsewhere, Pete sings Verity's praises but fails to change opinions, and it's over for Chloe L and Jake.
180	10	"Episode 10"	15 July 2015	50 minutes	1,014,000
Verity is still public enemy number one but finally takes it on herself to meet Danni and apologise for her wrong-doings but it all backfire when Danni shoots her down. Lockie is forced to explain himself after Verity reveals the truth about their night together and Pete is torn by the feud. Meanwhile, Lewis becomes Arg's personal trainer, and Bobby is taken aback when Gemma demands an apology from him. Elsewhere, Dan is let down gently as Lauren feels the only way her and Jess can move forward is if her and Dan ends things for the time being.
181	11	"Episode 11"	19 July 2015	50 minutes	833,000
Arg feels the pressure from Lewis as his new wedding band manager and tries to think of a way to let him down gently and fire him. Nanny Pat hosts a Great British Bake Off themed day where Chloe S produces the winning cake, whilst Danni has a run-in with Vas over Verity. Tommy begins to see that Verity has been treated unfairly so invites her out with them so that she can clear the air with the girls, but Danni refuses any sort of olive branch. Following another disagreement with Jess, Lauren admits she's fed up of the girls ostracising her so tells Vas to release an incriminating video.
182	12	"Episode 12"	22 July 2015	50 minutes	951,000
Vas shares a video around Essex to clear Verity's name but it horribly backfires on Lockie as he's seen trying it on with her. Arg makes a public apology to Lewis, and news spreads that Chloe L has spent the night with Jake again. Pete's attention slips to Jess as he sees a side of Verity he doesn't like, whilst Jake confronts Chloe L over her mixed signals. Bobby and Gemma settle their differences, Danni is shocked when Lockie tells her how he really feels about their past relationship, and Lauren and Dan finally give into temptation and share a kiss.

== Reception ==
=== Ratings ===
Episode	Date	Official ITVBe rating	ITVBe weekly rank	ITVBe+1 viewers	Total ITVBe viewers
Marbs 1	14 June 2015	881,000	1	64,000	945,000
Marbs 2	17 June 2015	766,000	2	74,000	840,000
Episode 3	21 June 2015	922,000	1	59,000	981,000
Episode 4	24 June 2015	757,000	2	63,000	820,000
Episode 5	28 June 2015	986,000	1	37,000	1,023,000
Episode 6	1 July 2015	959,000	1	20,000	979,000
Episode 7	5 July 2015	730,000	2	62,000	792,000
Episode 8	8 July 2015	911,000	1	52,000	963,000
Episode 9	12 July 2015	749,000	2	27,000	776,000
Episode 10	15 July 2015	948,000	1	66,000	1,014,000
Episode 11	19 July 2015	769,000	2	64,000	833,000
Episode 12	22 July 2015	883,000	1	68,000	951,000
Series average		855,000	1	55,000	910,000
