= The Only Way Is Essex series 2 =

The Only Way Is Essex
- Season 2
- No. of episodes: 14

Release
- Original network: ITV2
- Original release: 20 March – 4 May 2011

Series chronology
- ← Previous; Series 1 Next → Series 3

The second series of The Only Way Is Essex, a British semi-reality television programme, began airing on 20 March 2011 on ITV2. The series concluded on 4 May 2011 and consisted of fourteen episodes. This is the first series to include Carol Wright, Chloe Sims, Debbie Douglas, Frankie Essex, Gemma Collins, Joey Essex, Mick Norcross and Nicola Goodger, and briefly included Leah Wright, the cousin of Mark and Jess Wright, before she later returned in the ninth series. It is the last series to include Amy Childs before her return in 2020. The series heavily focused on the relationship between Lauren G and Mark, where the pair celebrate an engagement, failed to win over the support from the Wright family, before splitting when Mark puts his club promoting before his fiancée. It also featured the demise of Arg and Lydia's relationship, the blossoming romance between Joey and Sam, and Kirk and Lauren P taking things to the next step despite the disapproval from her best friend Maria.

== Cast ==
- Amy Childs
- Billie Faiers
- Carol Wright
- Chloe Sims
- Debbie Douglas
- Frankie Essex
- Gemma Collins
- Harry Derbridge
- James "Arg" Argent
- Jess Wright
- Joey Essex
- Kirk Norcross
- Lauren Goodger
- Lauren Pope
- Leah Wright
- Lucy Mecklenburgh
- Lydia Rose Bright
- Maria Fowler
- Mark Wright
- Mick Norcross
- Nicola Goodger
- Patricia "Nanny Pat" Brooker
- Sam Faiers

== Episodes ==
No. overall	No. in series	Title	Original release date	Duration	UK viewers
12	1	"Episode 1"	20 March 2011	45 minutes	1,547,000
Amy introduces her new client Chloe to the group where Mark encourages his little cousin Joey to make a move with Lucy. As Arg and Lydia look for a flat together she is appalled when he suggests living in the flat below Mark, feeling he is always the strain on their relationship. Kirk attempts to set Gemma up with his dad, but his attention wanders elsewhere towards Chloe. Elsewhere Sam and Billie host a launch party for their new shop, Jess seeks advice over getting a boob job, and Mark announces his plans to give his relationship with Lauren G another go.
13	2	"Episode 2"	23 March 2011	45 minutes	807,000
Harry has a work trial at Amy’s salon but it doesn’t go well when his first job is to give Gemma a vajazzle. Lauren G gets her tattoo of Mark’s name removed to cut him out of her life – but she has a sudden change of heart when he proposes to her, where she accepts. Arg struggles when Debbie, the mother-in-law from hell takes him for a driving lesson, and Lauren G and Mark’s engagement news has mixed reactions from the group. Feeling guilty, Lucy reveals to Lauren G that she has slept with Mark recently sparking trouble in paradise already.
14	3	"Episode 3"	27 March 2011	45 minutes	1,404,000
Lauren G packs her bags to move in with Mark but faces disapproval from her family when they feel she’s rushing into things after her sudden change of heart. Just as Lauren P gets smitten with Kirk, she has no idea he is thinking about breaking up with her and is left in bits when he tells her he needs to be single. Elsewhere Harry and Gemma help Amy find a new assistant for the salon, Arg fails his driving theory test, Chloe is recruited to work for Sugarhut and Joey and Lucy hit it off until he tells her he looks up to Mark.
15	4	"Episode 4"	30 March 2011	45 minutes	1,219,000
Lydia demands Arg to go on a diet but it doesn’t go to plan when she catches him secretly snacking, whilst Amy gives Paloma a glamorous new look. Lauren P still reels from her break-up with Kirk unaware he’s already set his sights on Chloe when they have a heart-to-heart about their past. Lauren G tries to impress the Wright’s by cooking a meal for them, but she is left red faced when Mark abandons her to spend time with Arg. Joey and Lucy clash again over Mark until he turns his attention to Sam.
16	5	"Episode 5"	3 April 2011	45 minutes	1,344,000
Just as Joey is about to bite the bullet and ask out Lucy, he sees her flirting with Kirk instead leaving both him and Chloe confused. Arg tries to surprise Lydia by revealing he’s bought a ruined house for them to do up together but is surprised by her reaction when she breaks down over feeling second best to Mark. Kirk and Lucy’s first date doesn’t go to plan when they bump into Lauren P, and Maria turns nasty with Lucy as she defends her friend. Kirk has no choice but to apologise to Lauren P when emotions run high, whilst Arg struggles with his new diet.
17	6	"Episode 6"	6 April 2011	45 minutes	1,352,000
Joey is still torn between Lucy and Sam and is determined to ask one of them out at Harry’s 17th birthday party. Lauren P meets with Kirk to clear the air but end up getting back together much to Maria’s disgrace, whilst Mark and Lauren G take their relationship to the next step by going to the kennels to look for dogs. Arg desperately attempts to get back into Lydia’s good books as Kirk reduces Maria to tears as he tries to defend his relationship. Meanwhile Joey and Sam get frisky at the party as a distressed Mark looks on.
18	7	"Episode 7"	10 April 2011	45 minutes	1,385,000
Lauren G is raging when Mark suggests to her he starts a modelling agency and tries anything to mark her stamp on him. Maria is disappointed when Lauren P chooses Kirk’s side rather than hers, and they face an awkward meeting at Gemma’s pub quiz. Sam is far from impressed when she receives a lecture from Mark for kissing Joey as he lists what she can and can’t do, whilst Arg becomes increasingly desperate to win Lydia round but instead she tells him she can’t be with him anymore.
19	8	"Episode 8"	13 April 2011	45 minutes	1,686,000
Mark and Lauren G attend a wedding fair where it’s clear they both have very different ideas of the type of wedding they want, but things take a turn when they catch Sam modelling one of the wedding dresses. Arg visits Mr Darcy the pig as an excuse to see Lydia, whilst Amy hosts a botox party where Jess isn’t happy to hear Lauren G slag her brother off. Elsewhere Joey and Sam go on their first date but she isn’t impressed when it appears to be a bike ride showing her all the places he used to hang round when he was a kid, including a dump.
20	9	"Episode 9"	17 April 2011	45 minutes	1,401,000
The day of Mark and Lauren G’s big engagement party arrives and the guests are shocked at the scale of it comparing it to an actual wedding. Lauren G is shocked to discover that Mark has had a secret meeting with Sam to discuss his new modelling agency idea, whilst Chloe, Gemma and Maria go on the hunt for an Essex hunk. As Carol makes her feelings towards the wedding known, Lauren G lashes out by blaming the Wright’s for the recent drift between them and Mark. Elsewhere Sam and Mark have another heart-to-heart.
21	10	"Episode 10"	20 April 2011	45 minutes	1,755,000
Joey has a proposition for Mick as he plans to be the face of one of the nights at Sugarhut, whilst Mark encourages Lauren G to become more involved with his family and make an effort with Carol. Billie and Lucy break some heart-breaking news to Lydia after rumours surface that Arg cheated on her, and Arg has no choice but to protest his innocence. Amy, Harry, Gemma, Sam and Joey go glamping where Joey asks Sam to be his girlfriend, meanwhile Debbie forces Lydia to get to the bottom of the rumours surrounding Arg.
22	11	"Episode 11"	24 April 2011	45 minutes	1,481,000
Mark thinks of a way of taking Arg’s mind off of Lydia so plans a game of tennis doubles with him, Lauren G and Amy, and things get interesting when they decide the loser has to do a forfeit. Mick invites Chloe to Kirk’s birthday party as his plus one leaving Gemma jealous, and there’s tension between the two girls as they discuss the future. Arg confronts Sam and Billie as he accuses them of starting the rumour which caused the demise of his relationship with Lydia, whilst Mark streaks naked as a forfeit for losing the tennis match.
23	12	"Episode 12"	27 April 2011	45 minutes	1,759,000
Lydia starts to wonder if Amy is the girl in the rumour who slept with Arg but Debbie assures her otherwise, whilst Kirk makes a big gesture to Lauren P by asking her to move in with him. Gemma makes a bold move by baking a pie for Mick and leaving it on his doorstep in an attempt to win him over, and Lauren G is disappointed when she doesn’t have Maria’s support. As Joey’s big reem night turns out to be a success, a jealous Mark leaves early and promises he will be back on the Essex scene with a bang.
24	13	"Episode 13"	1 May 2011	45 minutes	1,607,000
With Joey now taking over Essex with his club nights, Mark is determined to get back on the scene and reclaim his title, but faces obstacles when Lauren G disapproves. Lydia decides to confront Amy on the rumours surround Arg cheating but despite denying them, the pair get nasty with each other. Gemma is head over heels with Mick and gets a royal vajazzle in yet another attempt to woo him, meanwhile Mark and Lauren G apologise to the Wrights for the recent rift in the family. Elsewhere Joey helps Harry choose his first car.
25	14	"Episode 14"	4 May 2011	60 minutes	1,858,000
Lauren G is infuriated to discover she isn’t invited to Mark’s pool party in case she makes the female guests feel uncomfortable, whilst Amy also learns some shock truths when she finds out Arg has been telling Lydia that they have slept together. After finding out Mick holds a torch for somebody, Gemma prepares herself to get her man but is left bitterly disappointed to learn it’s actually Nicola he has feelings for. Elsewhere Lydia invites a date to the pool party, and Lauren G arrives intending to cause havoc as she ends the relationship with Mark and pushes him in the pool.

== Reception ==
=== Ratings ===
Episode	Date	Official ITVBe rating	ITVBe weekly rank	ITVBe+1 viewers	Total ITVBe viewers
Episode 1	20 March 2011	1,370,000	2	177,000	1.547,000
Episode 2	23 March 2011	737,000	3	70,000	807,000
Episode 3	27 March 2011	1,239,000	2	165,000	1,404,000
Episode 4	30 March 2011	1,010,000	3	209,000	1,219,000
Episode 5	3 April 2011	1,161,000	2	183,000	1,344,000
Episode 6	6 April 2011	1,146,000	3	206,000	1,352,000
Episode 7	10 April 2011	1,246,000	2	139,000	1,385,000
Episode 8	13 April 2011	1,409,000	2	277,000	1,686,000
Episode 9	17 April 2011	1,178,000	3	223,000	1,401,000
Episode 10	20 April 2011	1,467,000	2	288,000	1,755,000
Episode 11	24 April 2011	1,255,000	3	226,000	1,481,000
Episode 12	27 April 2011	1,551,000	2	208,000	1,759,000
Episode 13	1 May 2011	1,367,000	3	240,000	1,607,000
Episode 14	4 May 2013	1,574,000	2	284,000	1,858,000
Series average		1,265,000	2	207,000	1,466,000
