= Jay Conroy =

English footballer (born 1986)

Personal information
- Full name: Jay Michael Conroy
- Date of birth: 2 March 1986 (age 40)
- Place of birth: Redhill, Surrey, England
- Position: Right-back

Team information
- Current team: Three Bridges

Youth career
- 2002–2005: Crystal Palace

Senior career*
Years	Team	Apps	(Gls)
2004–2005	Crystal Palace	0	
2004–2005	→ AFC Wimbledon (loan)	22	(0)
2005–2006	Canvey Island	10	(0)
2005–2006	→ Sutton United (loan)		
2006–2007	Chelmsford City	31	(2)
2007–2008	Lewes	35	(0)
2008–2009	Havant & Waterlooville	15	(0)
2009	Northwich Victoria		
2009–2010	AFC Wimbledon	46	(0)
2010–2011	Farnborough	28	(0)
2011–2012	Sutton United		
2016	Redhill		
2016	Walton Casuals	1	(0)
2016–	Three Bridges	1	(0)
- * Club domestic league appearances and goals as of 14:45, 24 September 2016 (UTC)

Jay Michael Conroy (born 2 March 1986) is an English semi-professional footballer, model and actor who plays for Isthmian Division One South side Three Bridges.

Having started his footballing career as a trainee at Crystal Palace, he spent almost ten years in non-league football with his most notable spells coming for AFC Wimbledon, Chelmsford City, Lewes and Farnborough. He has won the Isthmian League Division One and Conference South during his career.

As a part-time model, Conroy has worked alongside brands including Nivea, Gillette and Abercrombie & Fitch, while fronting a national Breast Cancer campaign and featuring on Men's Health, Men's Fitness and GQ Fitness magazine covers.

He also appeared in Series 1 of The Only Way Is Essex, building a close relationship with TV personality Amy Childs.

== Football career ==
=== Crystal Palace ===
Conroy began his career as a trainee at Crystal Palace, but was unable to break into the first team and failed to make his professional debut. On 11 May 2004, he lined-up at Selhurst Park as part of a Crystal Palace XI for Steve Kember's testimonial.

=== AFC Wimbledon (loan) ===
After appearing for AFC Wimbledon during pre-season, Conroy joined the club on loan during the 2004–05 season. Extending his initial short-term deal with the Dons, he totalled 22 appearances for the club in the season which saw them crowned champions of the Isthmian League Division One.

His successful spell at the club was hindered in his final game before being recalled by Iain Dowie, which saw the youngster suffer a broken fibula, fractured tibia and ruptured ankle ligaments against Croydon. The injury kept Conroy out of action for 11 months.

=== Canvey Island ===
In August 2005, Conroy completed a move to Canvey Island following his release from Crystal Palace. Despite lining-up for Aldershot Town on trial during the summer, he signed a one-year deal with the Gulls in the Conference National. However, after struggling to break into the first team the 19-year-old was placed on the transfer list in November. He managed 10 appearances before his release at the end of the season.

=== Sutton United (loan) ===
Unable to seal a permanent move away from Park Lane, Conroy joined Conference South club Sutton United on a one-month loan in December 2005.

=== Chelmsford City ===
He later signed for Chelmsford City, where he spent the complete 2006–07 season. Netting his first and second goals in senior football, the defender made 31 appearances as he finished third in the Isthmian League Premier Division.

=== Lewes ===
Conroy joined Lewes ahead of the 2007–08 season, and went on to make 35 appearances as his side clinched the Conference South title.

On 20 October, Conroy was involved in an incident which saw Lewes manager Steven King "fear for his player's life". Playing in a 3–0 defeat to Eastleigh, Conroy was knocked unconscious and suffered convulsions following an aerial challenge with striker Paul Sales.

=== Havant & Waterlooville ===
In May 2008, Conroy became one of five players to join Havant & Waterlooville from Lewes. However, his contract was terminated by mutual consent in January 2009, having made 15 appearances in his second season with the club.

=== Northwich Victoria ===
Shortly after his departure from West Leigh Park, Conroy agreed terms with Northwich Victoria and completed a move on 23 January. He remained with the club for two months as The Vics were later relegated to the Conference North at the end of the 2008–09 season.

=== AFC Wimbledon ===
Conroy then re-joined AFC Wimbledon on a permanent basis in March 2009, after Luke Garrard and Andy Sambrook were ruled out of action due to injury. He made eight appearances in the closing weeks of the Conference South winning season, before become a first-team regular during the 2009–10 season.

Making 37 appearances for the first team, as well as a single game for the reserves, he picked up two red cards during the club's inaugural season in the Conference National. During his time at the club, he also worked as a fitness coach and nutritionist for the first team.

In April 2010, manager Terry Brown announced that Conroy would be one of 12 players released by the club at the end of the season. Following his departure, he admitted he would have liked to have remained with the club. Conroy also thanked Brown for "rescuing his career" after his former club's financial difficulties.

=== Farnborough ===
He joined Farnborough for the 2010–11 season, but suffered a broken ankle in the opening weeks of the campaign. After a short spell on the sidelines, Conroy returned and went on to make 28 appearances for Boro. His final appearance came in a 1–0 victory over Woking in the Conference South play-offs.

=== Sutton United ===
Conroy then made a return to Conference South side Sutton United for the 2011-12 campaign, and saw the club finish fourth before falling to Welling United in the play-off semi-finals.

== Modelling career ==
Joining Select Model Management in December 2009, Conroy has gone on to model for a variety of TV advertisements and health magazines. He has worked alongside Nivea, Gillette and Abercrombie & Fitch.

In 2013, he was selected as Jeff Banks' Pink Pants Breast Cancer Campaign model. He featured on the cover of UK Men's Health in January and February 2013, as well as the Italian Men's Health Cover in May 2013. In September 2013, Conroy was the cover model for UK Men's Fitness, and worked as a GQ Fitness model between August 2013 and January 2014.

== Acting career ==
Conroy featured in Series 1 of The Only Way Is Essex, and first appeared in Episode 2.

He also played the role of Roger in 2012 Indian romantic drama film Jab Tak Hai Jaan.

== Personal life ==
Conroy is the older brother of footballer Dion Conroy. Following the success of his modelling career, he has over 100,000 followers on social networking application Instagram. Conroy was named Surrey National Golf Champion between 2001 and 2004, and also won the South England Brighton Open Swimming Champion 100m Breaststroke in 2003. He completed the UK London Triathlon in 2013.
