= The Only Way Is Essex series 1 =

The Only Way Is Essex
- Season 1
- No. of episodes: 10 + Christmas special

Release
- Original network: ITV2
- Original release: 10 October – 10 November 2010

Series chronology
- Next → Series 2

The first series of The Only Way Is Essex, a British semi-reality television series, began airing on 10 October 2010 on ITV2. The series concluded on 10 November 2010 after ten episodes. An Essexmas special aired on 24 December 2010 and is included on the Series 1 DVD. This is the first series to include cast members Amy Childs, Billie and Sam Faiers, Harry Derbidge, James "Arg" Argent, Jess and Mark Wright, Kirk Norcross, Lauren Goodger, Lauren Pope, Lucy Mecklenburgh, Lydia Bright, Maria Fowler and Patricia "Nanny Pat" Brooker, and the only series to feature Candy Jacobs and Michael Woods. The series focused heavily on the aftermath of Mark and Lauren G's break-up and his attempts to get over her by turning to both Lucy and Sam. It also featured Arg trying to win back his ex-girlfriend Lydia, and Kirk's brief romance with Amy before getting with Lauren P.

== Cast ==
- Amy Childs
- Billie Faiers
- Candy Jacobs
- Harry Derbidge
- James "Arg" Argent
- Jess Wright
- Kirk Norcross
- Lauren Goodger
- Lauren Pope
- Louyisa Faires
- Lucy Mecklenburgh
- Lydia Bright
- Maria Fowler
- Mark Wright
- Michael Woods
- Patricia "Nanny Pat" Brooker
- Sam Faiers

== Episodes ==
No. overall	No. in series	Title	Original release date	Duration	UK viewers
1	1	"Episode 1"	10 October 2010	60 minutes	1,144,000
In the aftermath of Lauren G and Mark’s breakup, he is torn whether to attend her big birthday bash or not, and his attention wanders elsewhere into the direction of Sam. Kirk hits the gym in an attempt to impress Amy, whilst she seeks advice on how to woo her love interest. The pressure is on for girl band LOLA as they perform at Lauren G’s birthday party in front of a Universal representative, and Lauren G is sickened to see Mark and Sam together. The exes give each other some cold truths before Mark gives Lauren G a shock ultimatum over their relationship.
2	2	"Episode 2"	13 October 2010	30 minutes	781,000
Lauren G plans to turn her life around after her breakup with Mark and starts with looking for a new place to live as well as following a new career path. The gang head to a speed dating event where Kirk is jealous to see Amy flirting with other boys, before asking her out on a date to the zoo. Arg struggles to chat up girls despite Mark’s best efforts at giving advice, and Lauren G lashing out at Mark when they come face-to-face with him once more.
3	3	"Episode 3"	17 October 2010	30 minutes	896,000
Amy is far from impressed that Kirk is taking her to the zoo on their first date, but he uses it as an excuse to show off his interests. Sam faces an awkward confrontation with Lauren G as she quizzes her over her kiss with Mark, and Jess is over the moon when LOLA have a successful meeting with Universal. Elsewhere Amy goes up in the world as her modelling career takes off, Mark agrees to be LOLA’s new manager, and Kirk has a heart to heart with his Mum over the men in her life.
4	4	"Episode 4"	20 October 2010	30 minutes	N/A
Before Kirk takes Amy on their first date he seeks advise from Candy over what girls expect from dates, and Mark announces that he has a new girlfriend; Lucy. As Lauren G interviews some hopefuls for a fashion event, she comes face-to-face with Lucy but the pair fail to realise who each other are. Amy and Kirk’s date turns out to be a success, Arg is depressed as he comes up with a plan to win his ex-girlfriend back, and Mark receives a shock when he takes Lucy out on a date - only to bump into Lauren G.
5	5	"Episode 5"	24 October 2010	30 minutes	675,000*
Arg prepares for his performance at the 1960s themed party but is thrown to hear that Lydia will be making an appearance. Amy rages when Kirk tells her he is taking another girl to the party but receives a welcome surprise when he shows up with his Mum for her to meet. A bitter Lauren G resorts to insults when she’s faced with Lucy, and Kirk and Amy bicker again when he catches her dancing with Arg. Arg has a heart to heart with Lydia where he finally apologises for cheating on her – but he’s left broken when she tells him they have no future together.
6	6	"Episode 6"	27 October 2010	30 minutes	954,000
Lauren G panics as her fashion night approaches and is urged by her boss to allow Lucy to have her designs on the catwalk. Mark announces the plans for his new club to rival Kirk’s Sugarhut, and Sam has it out with her old friend Lucy about her new romance with Mark. With a model down Lauren G snaps up Mark to help her out knowing it would rub Lucy up the wrong way. Amy begins to have second thoughts about her blossoming relationship with Kirk, whilst Lauren G gives a nod to all the designers at her event but deliberately leaves Lucy out.
7	7	"Episode 7"	31 October 2010	30 minutes	1,015,000
With Mark’s club Deuces’ launch night round the corner, he becomes desperate to make sure it runs smoothly so hires Sam and Lydia to help out. Kirk refuses to apologise to Amy for his jealous outbursts, whilst Lydia agrees to put the past behind her and see where things go with Arg. Elsewhere LOLA are told that there are big things ahead but need to ditch Mark. And Lucy forces Mark to choose between her and Lauren G when she catches them speaking again. Mark is left heartbroken when the launch night descends into chaos and his new bar burns down.
8	8	"Episode 8"	3 November 2010	30 minutes	852,000
Kirk has a business meeting with Lauren P to entice her to DJ at the Sugarhut, but is soon interrupted when Sam catches them together and reports back to Amy. After letting Mark go as their manager LOLA celebrate their recent success. Amy hosts an Indian night with bad blood between her and Kirk when she finds out that he’s planning on taking Lauren P out on a date. Meanwhile, Arg is delighted when he and Lydia make it official again.
9	9	"Episode 9"	7 November 2010	30 minutes	1,009,000
Amy is on a mission to find a man and even joins a dating site, whilst Kirk takes Lauren P out on a date but has to bite his tongue when she receives attention off another man recognising her from her DJing. Lydia is fuming when she walks in on Arg hosting auditions for ring girls for Mark and Kirk’s big fight, and Julian consoles Lauren G as he tells her there’s still chemistry between her and Mark, and predicts Lucy is going to get hurt. Meanwhile Amy and Sam are smitten as they go on a double date.
10	10	"Episode 10"	10 November 2010	60 minutes	975,000
Mark and Kirk get some last minute training before their big fight. Lauren G is faced with a huge dilemma when she’s offered a job in Dubai, will she put her job before her feelings for Mark? Lucy has it out with Lauren G as it’s revealed that Mark is still in regular contact with her, and Amy invites her date to the boxing match. Mark is victorious over Kirk but his celebrations are short lived when Lauren G tells him about her job opportunity. Amy consoles a bruised Kirk in the aftermath of the fight.
11	11	"The Only Way Is Essexmas"	24 December 2010	60 minutes	973,000
Arg is faced with an impossible task of winning Lydia back when she feels he’s spending far too much time being led astray by Mark. Lauren G and Lucy clash again until they realise that Mark has been playing them both against each other, whilst Sam tells Amy she’s also slept with Mark. After LOLA lose a band member they host auditions for a replacement, and Arg goes all out to make it up to Lydia, buying her a pig for Christmas. Mark ends his short lived romance with Lucy and cuts all ties with Lauren G before leaving the Christmas party with Sam.

== Ratings ==
Episode	Date	Official ITV2 rating	ITV2 weekly rank	Official ITV2+1 rating	Total ITV2 viewers
Episode 1	10 October 2010	988,000	6	156,000	1,144,000
Episode 2	13 October 2010	590,000	8	191,000	972,000
Episode 3	17 October 2010	729,000	6	167,000	896,000
Episode 4	20 October 2010				
Episode 5	24 October 2010	675,000	8		
Episode 6	27 October 2010	697,000	8	257,000	954,000
Episode 7	31 October 2010	814,000	6	201,000	1,015,000
Episode 8	3 November 2010	661,000	9	191,000	852,000
Episode 9	7 November 2010	835,000	6	174,000	1,009,000
Episode 10	10 November 2010	778,000	4	197,000	975,000
Essexmas	24 December 2010	717,000	7	256,000	973,000
Series average		752,000	7	192,000	977,000
