= Billie Shepherd =

English television personality

- Born: Billie Leigh Faiers; 15 January 1990 (age 36); Brentwood, Essex, England
- Occupation: Television personality
- Years active: 2010–present
- Television: The Only Way Is Essex; Sam & Billie: The Mummy Diaries; Dancing on Ice
- Spouse: Greg Shepherd (m. 2019)
- Children: 3
- Relatives: Sam Faiers (sister)

Billie Leigh Shepherd (née Faiers; born 15 January 1990) is an English television personality who appeared on the ITVBe reality series The Only Way Is Essex from 2010 to 2016 and Sam & Billie: The Mummy Diaries from 2016 to 2021.

== Career ==
In 2010, Faiers began appearing in the ITV2 (now ITVBe) series The Only Way Is Essex. She made a brief appearance in the first series before becoming a regular cast member in series 2. Shepherd departed the show during the eighteenth series in 2016. Following her departure from The Only Way Is Essex, she began appearing in Sam Faiers: The Mummy Diaries (later renamed Sam & Billie: The Mummy Diaries in series 3) which documents Shepherd and her sister Sam bringing up their children. In October 2020, it was announced that Shepherd would be competing in the thirteenth series of the ITV competition programme Dancing on Ice. She was paired with Mark Hanretty. Shepherd withdrew from the competition on 6 February 2021 after suffering a head injury in training.

Since November 2021, Shepherd has co-hosted The Sam & Billie Show podcast with her sister Sam Faiers.

Shepherd's work includes advertising products on social media as an influencer. In May 2022, she was added to the UK's Advertising Standards Agency list of "non-compliant social media influencers" for improperly advertising products without adding requisite "ad" tags or labels to the adverts.

== Personal life ==
The family live in Brentwood, Essex.

== Filmography ==
Year	Title	Notes
2010–2016	The Only Way Is Essex	Series regular 1-18
2016–2021	Sam & Billie: The Mummy Diaries	Main cast 1-9
2021	Dancing on Ice	Contestant; Withdrew on week 4
2021–present	The Sam and Billie show	Podcast series 1-present
2021–present	Billie and Greg - The Family Diaries	Main cast 1-present
