= Sam Faiers =

English television personality and model

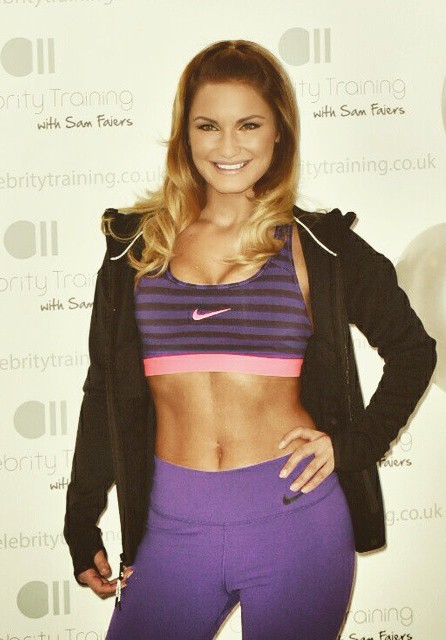
- Faiers in 2015
- Born: Samantha Elizabeth Faiers; 31 December 1990 (age 35); Brentwood, Essex, England
- Occupations: Television personality; model
- Years active: 2010–present
- Children: 3
- Relatives: Billie Shepherd (sister)

Samantha Elizabeth Faiers (born 31 December 1990) is an English television personality. She starred in the ITV2 reality series The Only Way Is Essex from 2010 to 2014, after which she competed in the thirteenth series of Celebrity Big Brother. Following this, Faiers fronted her own reality series, The Mummy Diaries, from 2016 to 2021.

== Career ==
On 10 October 2010, Faiers appeared in the first episode of The Only Way Is Essex and in total starred in eleven series of the show. The second series of the programme saw Faiers' sister Billie join the cast. During this series, Faiers also began a relationship with cast member Joey Essex. However, their relationship came to an end again months later in the ninth series.

In January 2014, Faiers entered the Celebrity Big Brother house to compete in the thirteenth series. She entered handcuffed to fellow housemate, American starlet Jasmine Waltz, as part of a task. It was revealed that Faiers had been meeting a journalist from OK! during her stay in the house, so that she could continue writing her weekly column for the magazine. Faiers made the final on Day 27 and finished in fifth place. While in the house, Faiers was unwell and stated that she 'couldn't keep food down' and was later diagnosed with Crohn's disease.

Faiers has made guest appearances on chat shows such as Loose Women, This Morning and Daybreak. She was a panellist on the fifth episode of series 8 of Shooting Stars and starred on the eleventh series of The Real Hustle, going undercover as a bitter ex-wife to help the Hustlers con a mark.

In March 2014, Faiers announced her exit from The Only Way Is Essex after the end of its eleventh series, due to her Crohn's disease diagnosis and to work on her relationship with Essex. In 2016, Faiers began starring in her own reality series on ITVBe, titled Sam Faiers: The Baby Diaries. Sister Billie was later added to the main cast, and the programme was retooled into Sam and Billie Faiers: The Mummy Diaries. In 2018, Faiers founded Revive Collagen, a company offering ready-to-drink collagen supplements. After the end of The Mummy Diaries in 2021, Faires began co-hosting The Sam & Billie Show podcast with her sister. Also in 2021, Faiers, as well as her son, voiced a character in Paw Patrol: The Movie.

== Personal life ==
Faiers was engaged to fellow The Only Way Is Essex cast member Joey Essex, but later split up. They reconciled later in 2012. Essex then proposed to Faiers again in March 2013 and Faiers accepted. However, the couple split up again on-screen in June 2013 following several arguments between the pair. In October 2014, they announced they had split up "for good".

In February 2014, Faiers was diagnosed with Crohn's disease. She displayed symptoms during her time in the Celebrity Big Brother house and was admitted to hospital twice for tests, which continued into February once she had left the house. She came under criticism in June 2024 after posting misinformation on Instagram regarding her "natural healing" to Crohn's.

== Filmography ==
As herself
Year	Title	Notes
2010–2014	The Only Way Is Essex	Main cast
2011–2013, 2017	Loose Women	Guest; 6 episodes
2011	Shooting Stars	Panellist; 1 episode
2011, 2013	Celebrity Juice	Panellist; 2 episodes
2012	Daybreak	Guest; 1 episode
2012	The Real Hustle	Guest; 1 episode
2012	The Million Pound Drop Live	Contestant; 1 episode
2013	All Star Mr & Mrs	Contestant; 1 episode
2013–2018	This Morning	Guest
2014	Celebrity Big Brother	Series 13 housemate
2014	Celebrity Big Brother's Bit on the Side	Series 13 housemate
2014	Big Brother's Bit on the Side	Guest; 1 episode
2014	Celebrity Big Brother's Bit on the Side	Guest; 1 episode
2016	Sam Faiers: The Baby Diaries	One-off special
2016–2021	Sam Faiers: The Mummy Diaries	Main cast

=== As actress ===
Film
Year	Title	Role	Ref.
2021	Paw Patrol: The Movie	Freed Puppy	
