= Lewis Bloor =

English television personality

Lewis Bloor is a British television personality known for his roles in two notable shows, The Only Way is Essex and Celebrity Big Brother.

== Career ==
Bloor was in eighty-three episodes of The Only Way is Essex, from 2013 where he joined the tenth series to 2016 where he quit during the seventeenth series. In 2016, he took part in the eighteenth series of Celebrity Big Brother, where he was the fifth housemate to be evicted – coming tenth overall.

In August 2019, Bloor was charged with conspiracy to defraud. Bloor was alleged to have dishonestly marketed coloured diamonds for investment purposes. He was acquitted of all charges.
