= Lucy Mecklenburgh =

English television personality and model (born 1991)

- Born: 24 August 1991 (age 35); Havering, London, England
- Occupations: Television personality; model
- Years active: 2010–present
- Partner(s): Mario Falcone (2010–2012); Ryan Thomas (2017–present; engaged)
- Children: 2

Lucy Mecklenburgh (born 24 August 1991) is an English television personality and model known for her appearances in the ITV2 reality series The Only Way Is Essex from 2010 to 2013. She later appeared in Tumble and Tour de Celeb.

== Career ==
=== The Only Way Is Essex ===
Mecklenburgh rose to fame as one of the cast members in the ITV2 reality series The Only Way is Essex. She remained on the series for three years, leaving after the tenth series.

=== Other work ===
In 2013, she was announced as a regular columnist for New! magazine. She is signed to Select modelling agency.

In 2014, Mecklenburgh appeared on Ladies of London (season 1, episode 7) modelling Caprice Bourret's line, By Caprice.

Also in 2014, Mecklenburgh also took part in the BBC One talent show Tumble with professional partner, Billy George.

In 2015, Mecklenburgh released a clothing range with PrettyLittleThing and modelled in their advertising campaign. She also put her name to a collection for Ellesse sportswear. She opened her own shop, called Lucy's Boutique, and began a fitness business named Results With Lucy.

Also in 2015, her debut book, Be Body Beautiful, was published by Penguin. In 2016, she did a modelling campaign for Barry M.

== Personal life ==
Between 2010 and 2012, Mecklenburgh dated and was engaged to Mario Falcone, but this relationship ended in 2012. In 2017, she started dating actor Ryan Thomas, after they met participating in Celebrity Island with Bear Grylls together. They have been engaged since June 2019.

She gave birth to her first child, a boy on 7 March 2020 with fiancé Ryan. She gave birth to her second child, a girl, on 29 May 2022. Ryan has a daughter Scarlett from a previous relationship with his former Coronation Street co-star Tina O'Brien.
