= The Only Way Is Essex =

British reality series

- Title card from series 28 onwards.
- Also known as: TOWIE
- Genre: Reality television
- Created by: Ruth Wrigley; Tony Wood
- Starring: Current and former cast
- Narrated by: Denise van Outen
- Opening theme: "The Only Way Is Up" by Yazz
- Country of origin: United Kingdom
- Original language: English
- No. of series: 37
- No. of episodes: 455 (list of episodes)

Production
- Camera setup: Multiple-camera setup
- Running time: 30-35 mins (1–20); 60 mins (specials, series 22–present)
- Production companies: Lime Pictures (series 1–32); Objective Entertainment (series 33–)

Original release
- Network: ITV2
- Release: 10 October 2010 – 30 July 2014
- Network: ITVBe
- Release: 8 October 2014 – 4 May 2025
- Network: ITV2
- Release: 17 August 2025 – present

The Only Way Is Essex (often abbreviated as TOWIE /ˈtaʊi/) is a British reality television series based in Brentwood, Essex, England. It shows "real people in modified situations, saying unscripted lines but in a structured way." Broadcast on ITV2 from 2010, the series was moved to ITVBe in October 2014 and moved back to ITV2 in 2025. The first series consisted of 10 episodes and ran for 30 minutes, with a Christmas special following later in the year. Due to popularity, the runtime was extended to 45-minute episodes and renewed for a year's airing. On 22 May 2011, the series won the Audience Award at the 2011 BAFTA Awards.

On 13 March 2016, ITVBe aired a one-off documentary hosted by former cast member Mark Wright, discussing the history of the series. On 28 February 2017, with the announcement of the cast for the show's twentieth series, it was confirmed that instead of the usual three series per year, ITVBe would only be airing two series, but with more episodes.

== Series ==
Year	Series	Number of episodes	Average viewers	Channel
2010	Series 1	10	977,000	ITV2
2011	Series 2	14	1,466,000	ITV2
2011	Series 3	14	1,772,000	ITV2
2012	Series 4	10	1,518,000	ITV2
2012	Series 5	10	1,576,000	ITV2
2012	Series 6	10	1,267,000	ITV2
2012	Series 7	10	1,441,000	ITV2
2013	Series 8	12	1,379,000	ITV2
2013	Series 9	12	1,386,000	ITV2
2013	Series 10	12	1,379,000	ITV2
2014	Series 11	12	1,491,000	ITV2
2014	Series 12	12	1,581,000	ITV2
2014	Series 13	11	1,092,000	ITVBe
2015	Series 14	13	992,000	ITVBe
2015	Series 15	12	910,000	ITVBe
2015	Series 16	12	1,069,000	ITVBe
2016	Series 17	14	1,123,000	ITVBe
2016	Series 18	10	1,056,000	ITVBe
2016	Series 19	10	1,044,000	ITVBe
2017	Series 20	18	1,047,000	ITVBe
2017	Series 21	18	898,000	ITVBe
2018	Series 22	10	996,000	ITVBe
2018	Series 23	11	1,112,000	ITVBe
2019	Series 24	11	956,000	ITVBe
2019	Series 25	11	991,000	ITVBe
2020	Series 26	18	746,000	ITVBe
2021	Series 27	11	575,000	ITVBe
2021	Series 28	10	401,000	ITVBe
2022	Series 29	11	600,000	ITVBe
2023	Series 30	10	125,000	ITVBe
2023	Series 31	11	—N/a	ITVBe
2024	Series 32	11	—N/a	ITVBe
2024	Series 33	11	400,000	ITVBe
2025	Series 34	11	—N/a	ITVBe
2025	Series 35	12	—N/a	ITV2
2026	Series 36	10	—N/a	ITV2
2026	Series 37	12	—N/a	ITV2

== Cast ==
This is a list of the main and supporting cast members currently appearing in the series. From series 1 to 3, the main cast received star billing in the opening credits and were credited by their first names.

Cast member	Duration
Lauren Goodger	2010–2012, 2015–2016; 2024–present
Amy Childs	2010–2011; 2020–present
Harry Derbidge	2010–2011, 2014; 2020–present
Billy Childs	2010, 2025–present
James "Diags" Bennewith	2012–present
Dan Edgar	2015–present
Amber Turner	2017–present
Jordan Brook	2017, 2022–present
Saffron Lempriere	2018–present
Ella Rae Wise	2019–present
Dani Imbert	2021–present
Bill Delbosq	2021–present
Elma Pazar	2022–present
Junaid Ahmed	2022–present
Sophie Kasaei	2023–present
Joe Blackman	2023–present
Jodie Wells	2023–present
Livvy Jay	2024–present
Joe Gurie	2026–present
Jonnie Gurie	2026–present

== Broadcast ==
From the programme's inception in 2010 until 2014, it was broadcast on ITV2. The Only Way Is Essex was one of many series that were moved to the newly-created channel, the target demographic of which was women. They still aimed to target 16-34 year olds with the channel move. After eleven years of the channel, it was announced that ITVBe would be closing down. As part of its closure, The Only Way Is Essex was moved back to ITV2.

== Production ==
The show was initially filmed just a few days in advance and has been narrated by Denise van Outen since its inception. The first series ran for four weeks, airing every Wednesday and Sunday. The show has been described by the Daily Mirror as Britain's answer to The Hills and Jersey Shore. Series 2 began on 20 March 2011, once again airing every Wednesday and Sunday, but with longer episodes than Series 1. Series 2 also saw the departure of original cast member Amy Childs. The second series consisted of 14 episodes, ending on 4 May 2011. The series returned for a third series on 25 September 2011 and was the final series to feature two of the original cast members Mark Wright whose departure was seen in the final episode while Kirk Norcross departed off-screen like Childs. The series ended on 9 November 2011. On 2 December 2011, it was revealed that many of the cast would not be returning for the fourth series in 2012 but would feature in the 2011 Christmas Special. The fourth series began in January 2012.

Digital Spy reported that the series had been renewed for a further four series following the Christmas Special and would air four 10-episode runs in 2012.

On 20 March 2020, it was announced that filming for the forthcoming twenty-sixth series had been postponed due to the impact of the COVID-19 pandemic on television. ITV said the move was to ensure the "safety of the cast and crew". Whilst off air, it was announced that the show would return later in the air with an extended series for the show's 10th anniversary and would include the return of old cast members, as well as going back to two episodes per week. The show returned for its twenty-seventh series on 14 March 2021 where it once again reverted to just one episode per week. Despite filming for this series taking place during a national lockdown, some restaurants and pubs opened especially for the show.

Two months after the twenty-seventh series had aired, the production team announced that the cast would face an overhaul, with several cast members having been axed. They described the change as an evolution of the series and explained that it would allow for the remaining cast to be featured more. They also assured axed cast members that they would be able to receive welfare support from ITV if needed and thanked them for appearing on the series.

In September 2024, when The Only Way Is Essex producer Lime Pictures shuttered its London production office, Objective Media Group (which is owned by Lime Pictures' parent All3Media) under its unscripted entertainment label Objective Entertainment had taken over Lime Pictures' reality state including The Only Way Is Essex with Objecitve Entertainment would produce future series starting with series 33.

== Music ==
In December 2011, the cast of the series released a cover of the Wham! song "Last Christmas", with their own version of the theme song "The Only Way Is Up" as the single's B-side. All profits from the single went to Text Santa. The song charted at number 33 on the UK Singles Chart.

Three years later, a 61-song compilation album titled The Only Way Is Marbs – Marbella Sessions was released on 23 June 2014 to coincide with the start of series 12 which saw the return of The Only Way Is Marbs. The album was mixed by cast member and DJ Lauren Pope. The Only Way Is Essex – Dance Anthems was then released on 13 October 2014. The album was the second to be mixed by Pope.

== Reception ==
The genre of "scripted reality" has attracted much criticism for a lack of authenticity, or indeed outright deception.

The show has been criticised for its negative and stereotypical representation of Essex, and there have been a number of complaints to ITV2. It contributed to the popularity of Essex girl jokes. Some Essex residents felt it was not a true representation of the area and the people who live there. Kirk Norcross responded to this criticism by saying, "We are all from Essex, so this is Essex. It's not acting. It's not like they've got people from America and said 'Right, act like you think you know where Essex is.' We are Essex people so what you're watching is Essex.". It is worth noting however, that at the time of this statement a significant number of cast members were not from Essex as claimed, including Norcross himself.

In April 2011, it was reported that Big Brother 8 winner Brian Belo intended to sue the makers of The Only Way Is Essex, claiming they "stole his idea". Belo was in the original pilot of the show – provisionally titled Totally Essex – alongside current stars Mark Wright, Sam Faiers, Kirk Norcross and Amy Childs. Belo planned to sue his former manager and Lime Pictures, which makes the show, for lost earnings of up to £100,000 a series.

On 24 October 2011, it was reported that sisters Sam and Billie Faiers had been attacked by a group of girls on a night out in London: "The sisters were first targeted inside the club when the girls made off with Billie's handbag ... When they left, the gang followed them back to Essex." An insider also commented saying "Both Sam and Billie later went to A&E to get checked out. They are fine now, just a bit shocked, although Sam has been left with two black eyes." A video of the attack leaked online a day later. The aftermath of the attack was aired during series 3 episode 10.

In May 2012, it was reported that original cast member Lauren Goodger had fallen out with the show's director for her bad timekeeping on set and her diva demands. Goodger appeared in the first four episodes of series 5, and was suspended from appearing in the show, however on 18 May 2012, it was confirmed that the issues had been resolved and that Goodger would be returning to the programme. She returned in episode 9 and her absence from the show was not mentioned on screen.

On 1 December 2012, it was reported that The X Factor finalist Rylan Clark would appear on the TOWIE Live special episode and later return as a full-time cast member in 2013. Mario Falcone reacted to the rumours by saying, "If he comes on Monday's live show, that's fine because it's all for charity, but if he comes on TOWIE as a main character, I'll leave. We hate him. He's a douche bag." Kirk Norcross commented, "I've met Rylan before and he's actually a really nice boy but when people think of Essex they just think of the abbreviation, the 'Shut-up', the 'Oh my god' – that was all Amy Childs and we don't want that." On 3 December, following Falcone and Norcross's comments, Clark pulled out of his one-off appearance for the live episode, later saying: "TOWIE's a great programme and I wish them all the best of luck, but I can't do the show because I’ve got commitments to the X Factor tour and I’ve got to be in rehearsals. I've never met Mario in my life, so I find it very unprofessional and ungentlemanly for him to go around talking about people he hasn't even met, Anyone who cheats on his girlfriend that much isn't worth my time."

The live episode was called "an utter car crash" and "possibly the worst TV show ever".
