= Bobby Norris =

English television personality (born 1986)

- Born: Bobby Norris; 22 August 1986 (age 39); Essex, England
- Occupations: Television personality and tv/radio presenter
- Years active: 2012–present
- Television: The Only Way Is Essex; Celebs Go Dating; Celebs on the Farm

Bobby Norris (born 22 August 1986) is an English television personality, known for his appearances on the ITVBe reality series The Only Way Is Essex from 2012 until Norris announced his departure from the series in 2021.

== Career ==
Norris made his television debut in the fourth series of the ITV2 (now ITVBe) series The Only Way Is Essex in 2012. During his tenure on the series, Norris has made appearances in various other British reality series, including Celebs Go Dating, Celebrity Ghost Hunt and Celebs on the Farm.

Having been presenting Access All Areas on FUBAR Radio from 2020, in July 2025 Norris began co-presenting (with Hawa Kassam) a weekday breakfast show for Kube Media Group.

== Personal life ==
Norris is gay. In an interview with Victoria Derbyshire, he stated that people send him death threats and "wish cancer" on him because of his sexuality. In 2019, he began a petition to make homophobia a criminal offence, and spoke in parliament about his campaign.

== Filmography ==
Year	Title	Notes
2012–2021	The Only Way Is Essex	Series regular
2012, 2014	I'm a Celebrity, Get Me Out of Here! NOW!	Guest appearances
2013–2018	Big Brother's Bit on the Side	Panelist
2017	Celebs Go Dating	Main cast
2018	Celebs on the Farm	Main cast; runner-up
2018	Celebrity Ghost Hunt	Main cast
2019	Celebs On The Ranch	Main cast; runner-up
2022	Celebrity Karaoke	Main cast; finalist
2024	Celebrity SAS: Who Dares Wins	Main cast
