= Chloe Sims =

English television personality

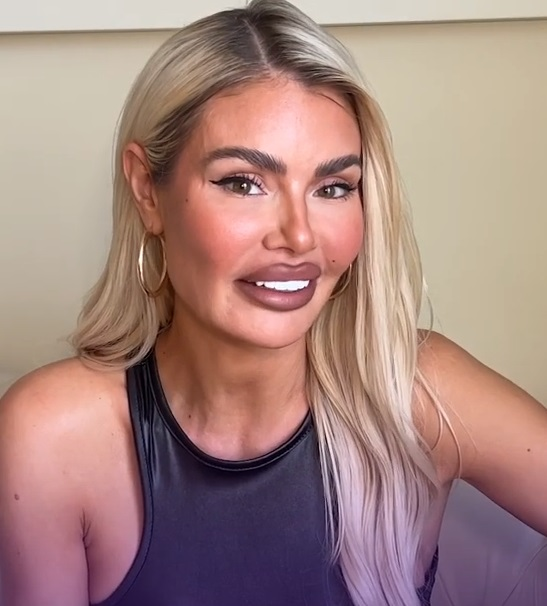
- Sims in 2022
- Born: Chloe Linda Daisy Margaret Sims; 2 November 1981 (age 44); Ilford, London, England
- Occupation: Television personality
- Years active: 2011–present
- Children: 1
- Relatives: Joey Essex (cousin); Demi Sims (half-sister)

Chloe Linda Daisy Margaret Sims (born 2 November 1981) is an English television personality. From 2011 to 2021, she appeared in the ITVBe reality series The Only Way Is Essex. Following her exit, she has gone on to appear in Celebrity Karaoke Club (2022) and fronted a reality show, House of Sims (2023), alongside her relatives.

== Early life ==
Sims was raised by her father, Tony Sims, following her mother leaving when she was three years old. Sims has three siblings, all of whom appeared alongside her on The Only Way Is Essex.

== Career ==
In 2011, Sims began appearing in the ITVBe reality series The Only Way Is Essex. She is the cousin of fellow cast members Joey Essex and Frankie Essex. In 2018, Sims appeared in the fifth series of Celebs Go Dating; and in 2019 in the seventh series, alongside her sister, Demi Sims. In July 2022, Sims announced that she had left The Only Way Is Essex; her two sisters, Frankie and Demi, announced their departure alongside her. At the time of her departure, Sims was the longest serving cast member. In 2022, she appeared in the ITV2 series Celebrity Karaoke Club, and the following year began starring in House of Sims, a series on the OnlyFans streaming network OFTV, alongside her family members. She confirmed in 2025 that she series would not be continuing past the first and only series.

== Personal life ==
She has a daughter, Madison Green, born in 2005. She appeared alongside her in The Only Way Is Essex.

== Filmography ==
As herself
Year	Title	Notes
2011–2021	The Only Way Is Essex	Main cast
2014	The Hooligan Factory	Ice Cream Van Girl
2018–2019	Celebs Go Dating	Main cast
2018–2020	Gemma Collins: Diva	Guest
2022	Celebrity Karaoke Club	Contestant
2023	House of Sims	Main cast
