= List of The Only Way Is Essex cast members =

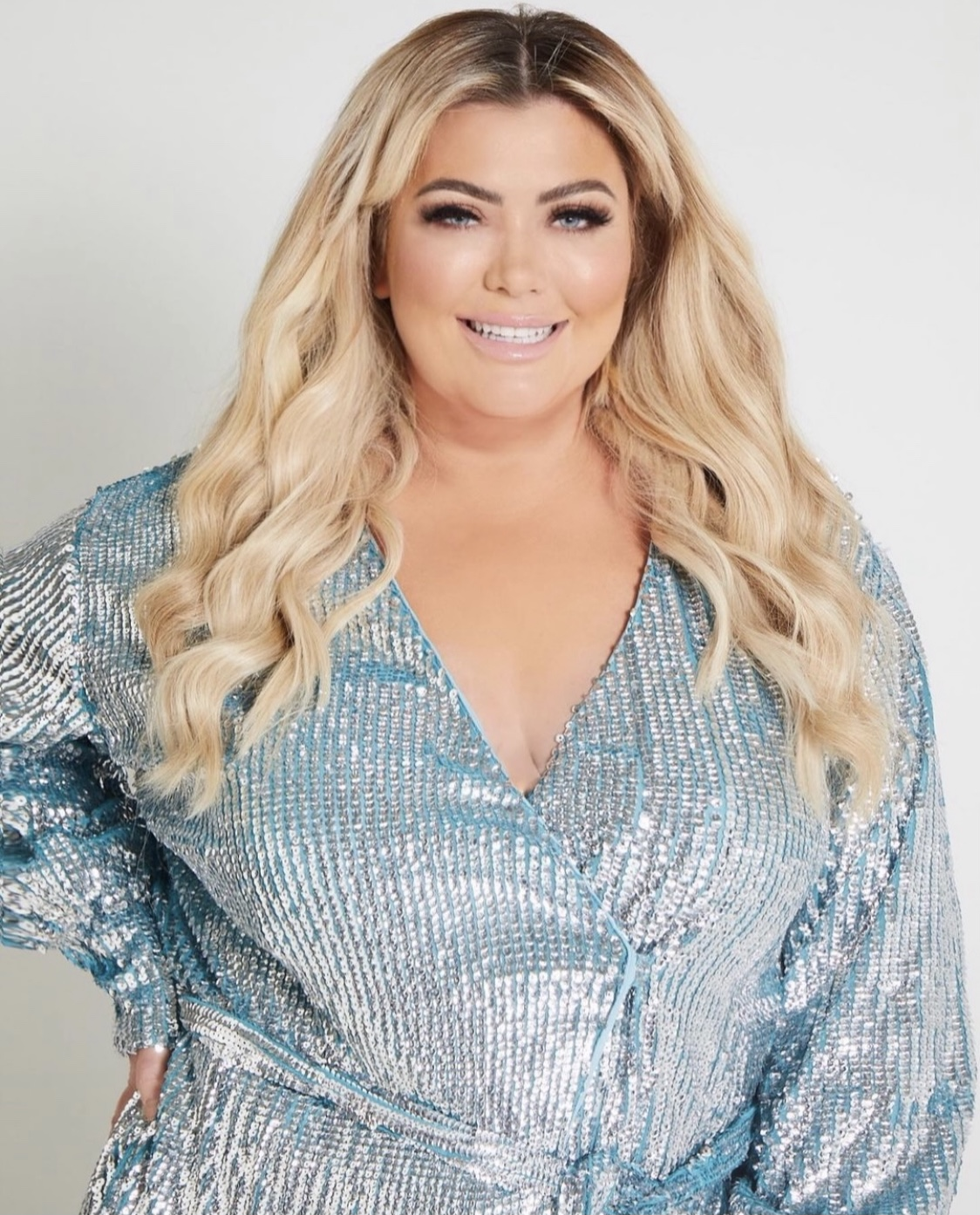
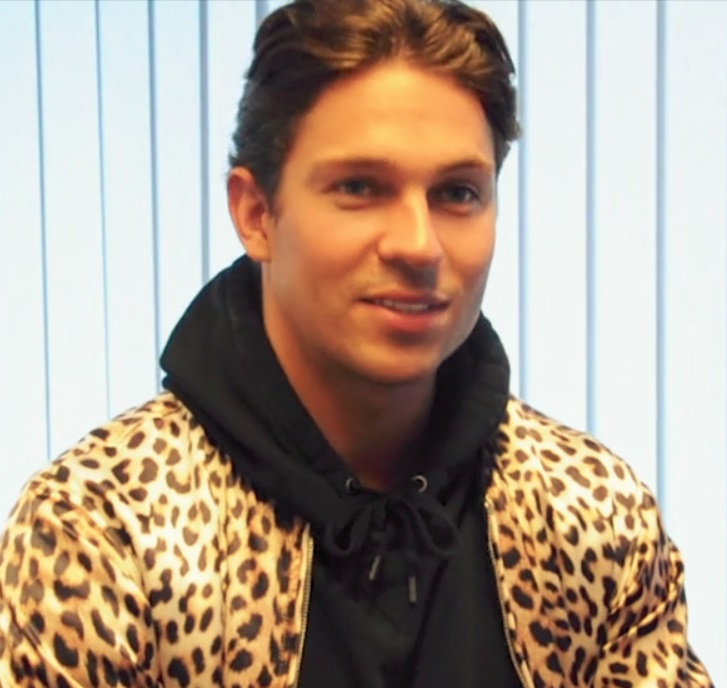
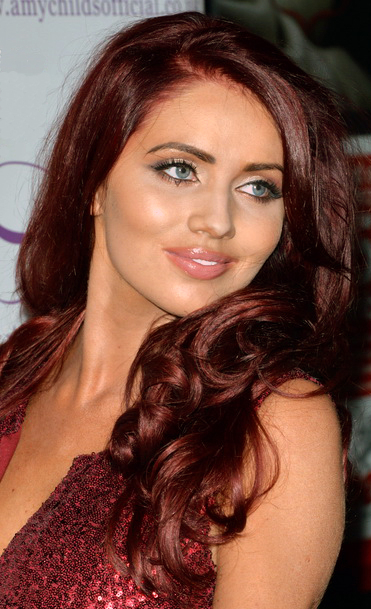
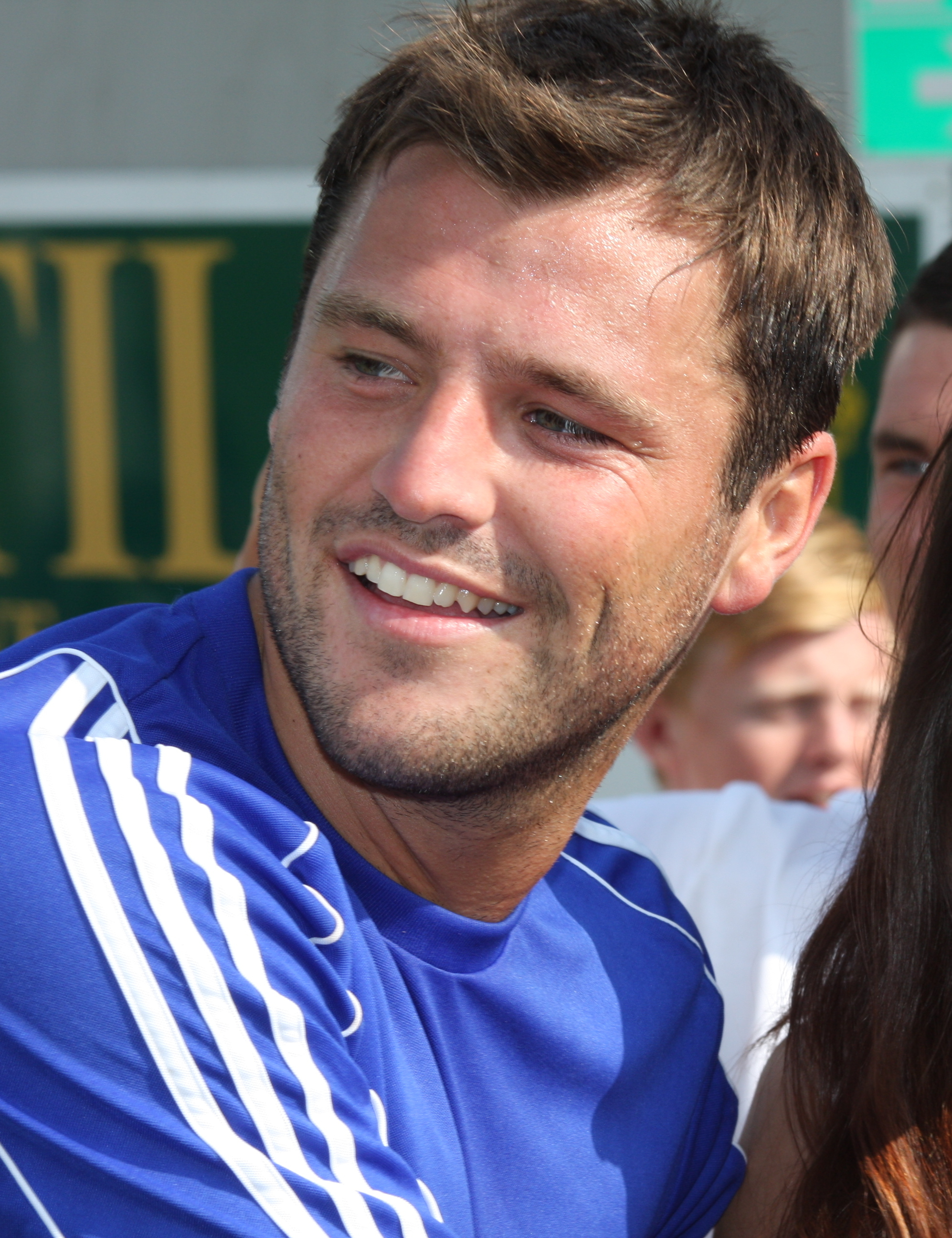
Gemma Collins, Joey Essex, Amy Childs and Mark Wright are cast members who have gone on to front their own television series after appearing on the show.

The following is a list of the cast members of the British semi-reality television programme The Only Way Is Essex.

== Current cast ==
This is a list of the current cast members appearing in the show in order of their first appearance.

Cast member	Series	Episode count*	Duration	Ref.
Lauren Goodger	1–6, 16, 19, 32–present	109	2010–2012, 2015–2016, 2024–present	
Amy Childs	1–2, 26–present	139	2010–2011, 2020–present	
Harry Derbidge	1–3, 12, 26–present	157	2010–2011, 2014, 2020–present	
Billy "Wills" Childs Jr.	1, 35–present	15	2010, 2025–present	
James "Diags" Bennewith	4–present	392	2012–present	
Dan Edgar	14–present	280	2015–present	
Amber Turner	20–present	182	2017–present	
Jordan Brook	20–21, 29–present	108	2017, 2022–present	
Saffron Lempriere	23–present	157	2018–present	
Ella Rae Wise	24–present	141	2019–present	
Dani Imbert	27–present	109	2021–present	
Bill Delbosq	28–present	53	2021–present	
Elma Pazar	29–present	83	2022–present	
Junaid Ahmed	29–present	86	2022–present	
Sophie Kasaei	30–present	54	2023–present	
Joe Blackman	31–present	57	2023–present	
Jodie Wells	31–present	52	2023–present	
Freddie Bentley	32–present	46	2024–present	
Livvy Jay	32–present	36	2024–present	
Joe Gurie	36–present	7	2026–present	
Jonnie Gurie	36–present	7	2026–present	

- ^*: All episode counts are correct as of Series 36, Episode 10.

== Former cast ==
This is a list of the former cast members appearing in the show in order of their last appearance.

Cast member	Series	Episode count	Duration	Ref.
Michael Woods	1	3	2010	
Candy Jacobs	1	6	2010	
Maria Fowler	1–3	26	2010–2011	
Nicola Goodger	2–4	15	2011–2012	
Peri Sinclair	3–4	11	2011–2012	
Georgio Georgiades	3–4	15	2011–2012	
Dino Georgiades	3–4	15	2011–2012	
Jon Bates	3–4	04	2011–2012	
Georgina Dorsett	4–5	15	2012	
Tom Kilbey	4–7	34	2012	
Cara Kilbey	3–7	49	2011–2012	
Mark Wright	1–3, 7	42	2010–2012	
Mick Norcross	2–8	53	2011–2013	
Danni Park-Dempsey	5–8	21	2012–2013	
Kirk Norcross	1–3, 7–8	54	2010–2013	
Darrell Privett	6–8	13	2012–2013	
Jack Bennewith	8	8	2013	
Danny Walia	7–8	12	2012–2013	
Chris "Little Chris" Drake	4–10	59	2012–2013	
Joey Essex	2–10	110	2011–2013	
Abi Clarke	8–10	26	2013	
Lucy Mecklenburgh	1–10	107	2010–2013	
Sam Faiers	1–11	129	2010–2014	
Grace Andrews	11–12	22	2014	
Tom Pearce	5–13	105	2012–2014	
Georgia Harrison	13	11	2014	
Leah Wright	2, 9, 11–14	22	2011, 2013–2015	
Dan Osborne	8–14	67	2013–2015	
Ricky Rayment	4–14	114	2012–2015	
Jasmin Walia	1, 7–14	78	2010, 2012–2015	
Mark Wright Snr.	3, 6–11, 16	25	2011, 2012–2015	
Patricia "Nanny Pat" Brooker	1–16	117	2010–2015	
Lewis Bloor	10–17	83	2013–2016	
Jake Hall	14–17	46	2015–2016	
Ferne McCann	9–18	101	2013–2016	
Jess Wright	1–16, 18	184	2010–2016	
Billie Faiers	1–18	184	2010–2016	
Ben Shenel	19–20	11	2016–2017	
Ercan Ramadan	19–20	12	2016–2017	
Milly McKenna	18–20	12	2016–2017	
Debbie Douglas	2–10, 12–20	131	2011–2013, 2014–2017	
Jamie Reed	3, 6, 8, 20	18	2011–2013, 2017	
Kate Wright	16–20	62	2015–2017	
Lydia Bright	1–7, 9, 11–20	186	2010–2017	
Carol Wright	2–21	154	2011–2017	
Charlie King	4–9, 20–21	63	2012–2013, 2017	
Tanya McKenna	18–21	17	2016–2017	
Megan McKenna	1, 17–21	60	2010, 2016–2017	
Ruby Lacey	21	9	2017	
Jack Rigden	20–21	23	2017	
Amber Dowding	18–21	49	2016–2017	
Taylor Barnett	21	14	2017	
Joan Collins	5–12, 20–23	38	2012–2014, 2017–2018	
Mike Hassini	16–18, 21, 23	52	2015–2018	
Dean Ralph	22–23	14	2018	
Jon Clark	17–23	83	2016–2018	
Jordan Wright	22–23	16	2018	
Billi Mucklow	3–8, 23	50	2011–2013, 2018	
Chris Clark	17–23	72	2016–2018	
Adam Oukhellou	22–23	10	2018	
Chloe Lewis	14–23	119	2015–2018	
Kady McDermott	23	5	2018	
Myles Barnett	20–23	47	2017–2018	
Lauren Pope	1–16, 20–23	201	2010–2015, 2017–2018	
Nathan Massey	18–22, 24	11	2016–2019	
Cara De La Hoyde	18–22, 24	9	2016–2019	
Vas J Morgan	12–19, 21–22, 25	73	2014–2019	
Sam Mucklow	23–25	24	2018–2019	
Gemma Collins	2–25	236	2011–2019	
Jayden Beales	24–25	20	2019	
Chloe Ross	24–25	22	2019	
Olivia Attwood	24–26	16	2019–2020	
Fran Parman	11–16, 20, 26	62	2014–2015, 2017, 2020	
Mario Falcone	3–11, 13–16, 19–21, 26	154	2011–2017, 2020	
Danielle Armstrong	10–19, 21, 25–26	119	2013–2017; 2019–2020	
Elliott Wright	1, 9–16, 21, 25–26	72	2010, 2013–2015, 2017, 2019–2020	
Shelby Tribble	22–26	38	2018–2020	
Matt Snape	25–26	15	2019–2020	
Charlie Sims	9–14, 25–27	59	2013–2015; 2019–2021	
Rem Larue	27	11	2021	
Joey Turner	24–27	48	2019–2021	
Kelsey Stratford	24–27	47	2019–2021	
Tom McDonnell	24–27	51	2019–2021	
Harry Lee	24–27	51	2019–2021	
Clelia Theodorou	22–27	70	2018–2021	
Nicole Bass	16–17, 26–27	45	2015–2016, 2020–2021	
Bobby Cole Norris	4–27	300	2012–2021	
Frankie Essex	2–10, 14, 19, 26, 28	79	2011–2013, 2015–2016, 2020–2021	
Georgia Kousoulou	11–28	218	2014–2021	
Clare Brockett	24–26, 28	19	2019–2021	
Chloe Sims	2–28	325	2011–2021	
Hannah Voyan	29	5	2022	
Mia Sully	29	5	2022	
Nikki Blackwell	17–21, 23, 25, 28–29	25	2016–2019, 2021–2022	
Liam "Gatsby" Blackwell	16–29	175	2015–2022	
Yazmin Oukhellou	20–26, 28–29	95	2017–2022	
Pete Wicks	15–29	181	2015–2022	
James "Lockie" Lock	8–30	256	2013–2023	
Tommy Mallet	13–27, 31	182	2014–2021, 2023	
Chloe Brockett	24–31	91	2019–2023	
Demi Sims	12, 23–28, 33	67	2014, 2018–2021, 2024	
Frankie Sims	25–28, 33	54	2019–2021, 2024	
James Argent	1–19, 21–23, 33	234	2010–2018, 2024	
Chloe Meadows	17–35	225	2016–2025	
Matilda Draper	34–35	11	2025	
Roman Hackett	27–35	95	2021–2025	
Sammy Root	33–35	23	2024–2025	
Courtney Green	17–37	234	2016–2026	
Josh Francis	36–37	7	2026	
Becks Bloomberg	32–36	37	2024–2026	

== Duration of cast ==
Current	Series																																				
Current	2010	2011		2012				2013			2014			2015			2016			2017		2018		2019		2020	2021		2022	2023		2024		2025		2026	
Current	1	2	3	4	5	6	7	8	9	10	11	12	13	14	15	16	17	18	19	20	21	22	23	24	25	26	27	28	29	30	31	32	33	34	35	36	37
Lauren G																																					
Amy																																					
Harry D																																					
Wills																																					
Diags																																					
Dan E																																					
Courtney																																					
Amber T																																					
Jordan B																																					
Saffron																																					
Ella																																					
Dani																																					
Bill																																					
Elma																																					
Junaid																																					
Sophie																																					
Joe B																																					
Jodie																																					
Freddie																																					
Livvy																																					
Becks																																					
Joe G																																					
Jonnie																																					
Josh																																					
Former	Series																																				
Former	2010	2011		2012				2013			2014			2015			2016			2017		2018		2019		2020	2021		2022	2023		2024		2025		2026	
Former	1	2	3	4	5	6	7	8	9	10	11	12	13	14	15	16	17	18	19	20	21	22	23	24	25	26	27	28	29	30	31	32	33	34	35	36	37
Michael																																					
Candy																																					
Maria																																					
Nicola																																					
Peri																																					
Georgio																																					
Dino																																					
Georgina																																					
Tom K																																					
Cara K																																					
Mark																																					
Mick																																					
Danni P-D																																					
Kirk																																					
Darrell																																					
Jack B																																					
Danny																																					
Little Chris																																					
Joey E																																					
Abi																																					
Lucy																																					
Sam F																																					
Grace																																					
Tom P																																					
George																																					
Leah																																					
Dan O																																					
Ricky																																					
Jasmin																																					
Mark Snr.																																					
Nanny Pat																																					
Lewis																																					
Jake																																					
Ferne																																					
Jess																																					
Billie																																					
Ben																																					
Ercan																																					
Milly																																					
Debbie																																					
Jamie																																					
Kate																																					
Lydia																																					
Carol																																					
Charlie K																																					
Tanya																																					
Megan																																					
Ruby																																					
Jack R																																					
Amber D																																					
Taylor																																					
Joan																																					
Mike																																					
Dean																																					
Jon																																					
Jordan W																																					
Billi																																					
Chris C																																					
Adam																																					
Chloe L																																					
Kady																																					
Myles																																					
Lauren P																																					
Nathan																																					
Cara DLH																																					
Vas																																					
Sam M																																					
Gemma																																					
Jayden																																					
Chloe R																																					
Olivia																																					
Fran																																					
Mario																																					
Danni A																																					
Elliott																																					
Shelby																																					
Matt																																					
Charlie S																																					
Rem																																					
Joey T																																					
Kelsey																																					
Tom M																																					
Harry L																																					
Clelia																																					
Nicole																																					
Bobby																																					
Frankie E																																					
Georgia																																					
Clare																																					
Chloe S																																					
Hannah																																					
Mia																																					
Nikki																																					
Gatsby																																					
Yaz																																					
Pete																																					
Lockie																																					
Tommy M																																					
Chloe B																																					
Demi																																					
Frankie S																																					
Arg																																					
Chloe M																																					
Matilda																																					
Roman																																					
Sammy																																					
