= The Only Way Is Essex series 32 =

The Only Way Is Essex
- Series 32
- No. of episodes: 11

Release
- Original network: ITVBe
- Original release: 24 March – 2 June 2024

Series chronology
- ← Previous; Series 31 Next → Series 33

The thirty-second series of the British reality television programme The Only Way Is Essex began airing on 24 March 2024 on ITVBe. The series concluded on 2 June 2024.

Filming for the series began in February 2024, with several episodes set in Bali. Chloe Brockett announced she would not be returning to the show via a statement in which she said she had decided to "take to step back" from the series. The series featured the return of original cast member Lauren Goodger, who departed at the end of the sixth series, before making brief returns in the sixteenth series and nineteenth series. It also featured the debuts of new cast members Becks Bloomberg, Freddy Bentley and Livvy Jay.

== Cast ==
- Amber Turner
- Amy Childs
- Becks Bloomberg
- Bill Delbosq
- Chloe Meadows
- Courtney Green
- Dan Edgar
- Dani Imbert
- Ella Wise
- Elma Pazar
- Freddie Bentley
- Harry Derbidge
- James "Diags" Bennewith
- Jodie Wells
- Joe Blackman
- Jordan Brook
- Junaid Ahmed
- Lauren Goodger
- Livvy Jay
- Roman Hackett
- Saffron Lempriere
- Sophie Kasaei

== Episodes ==
No. overall	No. in series	Title	Original release date	Duration
386	1	"Episode 1"	24 March 2024	60 minutes
387	2	"Episode 2"	31 March 2024	60 minutes
388	3	"Episode 3"	7 April 2024	60 minutes
389	4	"Episode 4"	14 April 2024	60 minutes
390	5	"Episode 5"	21 April 2024	60 minutes
391	6	"Episode 6"	28 April 2024	60 minutes
392	7	"Episode 7"	5 May 2024	60 minutes
393	8	"Episode 8"	12 May 2024	60 minutes
394	9	"Episode 9"	19 May 2024	60 minutes
395	10	"Episode 10"	26 May 2024	60 minutes
396	11	"Episode 11"	2 June 2024	60 minutes
