= The Only Way Is Essex series 22 =

The Only Way Is Essex
- Series 22
- No. of episodes: 10

Release
- Original network: ITVBe
- Original release: 25 March – 27 May 2018

Series chronology
- ← Previous; Series 21 Next → Series 23

The twenty-second series of the British reality television programme The Only Way Is Essex began on 25 March 2018 with the cast heading to Barcelona. It concluded on 27 May 2018 after ten episodes. The series was confirmed on 21 December 2017, when it was announced that a further two series had been commissioned for 2018. It was also confirmed that the series will only air once a week, unlike past series which aired twice a week. Ahead of the series, it was confirmed that a number of cast members had been axed including Chris Clark, Amber Dowding, Vas J Morgan, Mike Hassini, Jordan Brook, Jack Rigden, Taylor Barnett and Ruby Lacey. As well as this, Mario Falcone and Megan McKenna also confirmed that they would not be returning to the show. This was the final series to feature James Argent. New cast members for this series include Dean Ralph and Jordan Wright, who both previously appeared on Ex on the Beach, as well as Clelia Theodorou and Shelby Tribble.

This series focused heavily on the love triangle between Dan, Amber and Clelia, as well as Myles and Courtney's relationship troubles after cheating rumours coming to light and involvement from third parties.

== Cast ==
- Adam Oukhellou
- Amber Turner
- Bobby Cole Norris
- Chloe Lewis
- Chloe Meadows
- Chloe Sims
- Chris Clark
- Clelia Theodorou
- Courtney Green
- Dan Edgar
- Dean Ralph
- Gemma Collins
- Georgia Kousoulou
- James "Arg" Argent
- James "Diags" Bennewith
- James "Lockie" Lock
- Joan Collins
- Jon Clark
- Jordan Wright
- Lauren Pope
- Liam Blackwell
- Myles Barnett
- Pete Wicks
- Shelby Tribble
- Tommy Mallet
- Vas J Morgan
- Yazmin Oukhellou

== Episodes ==
No. overall	No. in series	Title	Original release date	Duration	UK viewers
268	1	"The Only Way Is Barcelona"	25 March 2018	60 minutes	986,000
Some of the group arrive in Barcelona, where Yaz is forced to confront the aftermath of Lockie’s outburst with her friends. Elsewhere, Amber discovers that Dan has been playing her once again, and Jon and Lauren come to blows. Back in Essex, Gemma and Arg make a big commitment. Diags feels heartbroken when he realises his crush is getting close to Pete, whilst Clelia contacts Amber to find out the truth about Dan. Jordan admits to fancying Courtney, and Chloe L makes it clear to Lockie that she thinks his behaviour is unacceptable.
269	2	"Episode 2"	1 April 2018	60 minutes	976,000
With Yaz needing time out from her relationship, Lockie faces a difficult chat with her Mum and Nan over their recent troubles. Elsewhere Myles hears that Jordan has been flirting with Courtney in Barcelona so desperately tries to figure out exactly what happened. Amber finally agrees to draw a line under her toxic feud with Dan, but their continuous rowing dents his chances of anything with Clelia. Pete introduces his new girlfriend to the group, much to the despair of Liam, and Myles lashes out at Jordan and Courtney before calling time on his relationship. Arg finally asks Gemma to be his girlfriend.
270	3	"Episode 3"	8 April 2018	60 minutes	1,087,000
Liam makes it his mission to make sure Pete finds out about him dancing with Shelby, whilst Pete laughs it off. Meanwhile Chloe M and Myles go head-to-head when he blames her for the breakdown of his relationship. After agreeing to start things fresh with Clelia, Dan starts to realise he still has feelings for Amber. Elsewhere Myles clears the air with Jordan, and reunites with Courtney, whereas Pete and Liam’s old feud is reignited. Amber and Clelia find common ground when they realise Dan has been playing them off against each other, and Dean has his sights set on one of the Essex girls.
271	4	"Episode 4"	15 April 2018	60 minutes	971,000
Pete and Liam come to blows once again when they come face-to-face in the street, whilst Amber promises to Dean that things are over between her and Dan. Gemma becomes increasingly desperate to have kids, but Arg expresses his fears. Elsewhere Clelia finds it difficult to mingle with the girls, and Jon tells Dean that Amber has recently slept with Dan. Chloe S plants a seed of doubt in Gemma’s head about her relationship with Arg, Dan confronts Jon over the rumours he’s been spreading, and Lockie and Yaz reach a good place.
272	5	"Episode 5"	22 April 2018	60 minutes	1,021,000
In order to clear some of the tension between the boys, Lockie organises a boat race. Lauren and Amber decide to call Jon out on his ongoing rivalry with Dan, whilst Courtney puts an end to her relationship with Myles. Clelia and Liam fail to move forward when both refuse to apologise to each other, a strong Courtney bypasses any hope of getting back with Myles, and Gemma and Arg are forced into a difficult conversation. Elsewhere Tommy thinks Shelby has an ulterior motive for wanting to fix things with Liam, and Chloe M gives Myles some crushing home truths.
273	6	"Episode 6"	29 April 2018	60 minutes	1,036,000
The group head to Brighton where Liam and Jon are quick to reveal that they’ve heard that Myles cheated on Courtney whilst they were together. There’s more strain on Yaz and Lockie’s relationship, and Pete and Shelby hit a bump in the road. Elsewhere, with everybody gossiping, Courtney announces she already knew about Myles’ infidelity, whereas Myles rages when he learns that it was Jon who started the rumour. Chloe S lashes out at Jon when she disagrees with a crude joke, and Yaz and Lockie confront each other.
274	7	"Episode 7"	6 May 2018	60 minutes	1,014,000
Dean admits that Chloe S is ticking all his boxes as the pair get closer, whilst Jon continues to ruffle feathers around Essex. Bobby hosts a booty party which ends in disaster following an altercation with Arg. After another fallout with Myles, Jon seeks advice from Chris, and Pete feels betrayed to hear that Shelby has gone for lunch with Liam. Arg’s comments spread around the group as the girls feel he’s getting malicious, and Chloe M confronts Amber after hearing what she’s been saying behind her back. Shelby is distraught as Pete takes a break from Essex.
275	8	"Episode 8"	13 May 2018	60 minutes	1,000,000
Arg is public enemy number one following his comments, but he feels that everybody is blowing things out of proportion. Dean wows Chloe S by taking her on a romantic date, but she’s left red faced when she hears he went home with Clelia instead. Amber and Dan’s spark is reignited, but Clelia’s involvement plays on her mind. Elsewhere Arg tries to make amends with Bobby, and Amber and Clelia clash once again. Liam makes it clear that he doesn’t agree with Dean’s treatment of Chloe S, Jordan is shut down by Courtney, and Dan and Amber are put on the spot.
276	9	"Episode 9"	20 May 2018	60 minutes	1,030,000
Everyone has an opinion on Amber and Dan’s situation, but she gets increasingly annoyed by Diags who fails to support her the way she’d hoped. Dean pulls Jordan up on a recent betrayal, but is more concerned about Chloe S moving on quickly with Adam. Myles is baffled when Jordan tries to interfere once again in his relationship with Courtney, whilst Yaz arranges some counselling for Amber and Dan. Elsewhere Chloe S refuses to accept Arg’s apology, and Clelia confronts Jordan with some home truths after news reaches her about rumours he’s spread.
277	10	"Episode 10"	27 May 2018	60 minutes	841,000
Myles has a huge gesture for Courtney as he tries to get their relationship back on track. Gemma and Arg hit the rocks following miscommunication at the airport. Lockie and Yaz discuss the future and the possibility of marriage, whilst Dan finally asks Amber to be his girlfriend. Courtney is torn whether to go to Mexico with Myles, but Chloe M encourages her to follow her heart rather than fear what everybody else might think. Adam and Chloe S continue to grow closer, whilst Gemma and Arg patch things up before heading for a summer in Spain.

== Reception ==
=== Ratings ===
Episode	Date	Official ITVBe rating	ITVBe weekly rank	ITVBe+1 viewers	Total ITVBe viewers
Barcelona	25 March 2018	920,000	1	66,000	986,000
Episode 2	1 April 2018	902,000	1	74,000	976,000
Episode 3	8 April 2018	1,059,000	1	28,000	1,087,000
Episode 4	15 April 2018	953,000	1	18,000	971,000
Episode 5	22 April 2018	966,000	1	55,000	1,021,000
Episode 6	29 April 2018	971,000	1	65,000	1,036,000
Episode 7	6 May 2018	934,000	1	80,000	1,014,000
Episode 8	13 May 2018	945,000	1	55,000	1,000,000
Episode 9	20 May 2018	972,000	1	58,000	1,030,000
Episode 10	27 May 2018	792,000	1	49,000	841,000
Series average		941,000	1	55,000	996,000
