= The Only Way Is Essex series 33 =

The Only Way Is Essex
- Series 33
- No. of episodes: 11

Release
- Original network: ITVBe
- Original release: 25 August – 3 November 2024

Series chronology
- ← Previous; Series 32 Next → Series 34

The thirty-third series of the British reality television programme The Only Way Is Essex began airing on 25 August 2024 on ITVBe. The series concluded on 3 November 2024. Filming began in July 2024, with the premiere episode filmed in Cyprus. All cast members from the previous series returned for this series. Love Island winner Sammy Root joined the cast during the series. Frankie and Demi Sims also returned in the final episode.

== Cast ==
- Amber Turner
- Amy Childs
- Becks Bloomberg
- Bill Delbosq
- Chloe Meadows
- Courtney Green
- Dan Edgar
- Dani Imbert
- Ella Wise
- Elma Pazar
- Freddie Bentley
- Harry Derbidge
- James "Diags" Bennewith
- Jodie Wells
- Joe Blackman
- Jordan Brook
- Junaid Ahmed
- Lauren Goodger
- Livvy Jay
- Roman Hackett
- Saffron Lempriere
- Sammy Root
- Sophie Kasaei

== Episodes ==
No. overall	No. in series	Title	Original release date	Duration
397	1	"Episode 1"	25 August 2024	60 minutes
398	2	"Episode 2"	1 September 2024	60 minutes
399	3	"Episode 3"	8 September 2024	60 minutes
400	4	"Episode 4"	15 September 2024	60 minutes
401	5	"Episode 5"	22 September 2024	60 minutes
402	6	"Episode 6"	29 September 2024	60 minutes
403	7	"Episode 7"	6 October 2024	60 minutes
404	8	"Episode 8"	13 October 2024	60 minutes
405	9	"Episode 9"	20 October 2024	60 minutes
406	10	"Episode 10"	27 October 2024	60 minutes
407	11	"Episode 11"	3 November 2024	60 minutes
