= The Only Way Is Essex series 21 =

The Only Way Is Essex
- Series 21
- No. of episodes: 17

Release
- Original network: ITVBe
- Original release: 10 September – 5 November 2017

Series chronology
- ← Previous; Series 20 Next → Series 22

The twenty-first series of the British reality television programme The Only Way Is Essex was confirmed on 3 June 2015 when it was announced that it had renewed for at least a further six series, taking it up to 21 series. The series began on 10 September 2017 with the cast going to Marbella, and concluded after seventeen episodes on 5 November 2017, making it the second longest series to date after it was confirmed that the lengths of each series would be extended. Ahead of the series it was announced that James Argent would be returning to the series following his break from the show. It was also confirmed that after making brief appearances during the previous series, Lauren Pope and Mario Falcone would be returning to the series as a full-time cast member. With this announcement, it was revealed that Mike Hassini would also be returning to the series having previously left the show after the eighteenth series.

Former cast member Elliott Wright also made an appearance during the second episode of the series, whilst Vas J Morgan also returned to the show mid-way through the series. This was also the first series to include new cast members Ruby Lacey and Taylor Barnett. Former cast member Danielle Armstrong also made a brief return to the series, appearing in the Halloween special episode airing on 29 October 2017. During the series, it was announced that Carol Wright had quit the show. A further Essexmas episode aired on 17 December 2017.

== Cast ==
- Amber Dowding
- Amber Turner
- Bobby Cole Norris
- Carol Wright
- Charlie King
- Chloe Lewis
- Chloe Meadows
- Chloe Sims
- Chris Clark
- Courtney Green
- Dan Edgar
- Danielle Armstrong
- Elliott Wright
- Gemma Collins
- Georgia Kousoulou
- Jack Rigden
- James "Arg" Argent
- James "Diags" Bennewith
- James "Lockie" Lock
- Joan Collins
- Jon Clark
- Jordan Brook
- Lauren Pope
- Liam Blackwell
- Mario Falcone
- Megan McKenna
- Mike Hassini
- Myles Barnett
- Nikki Blackwell
- Pete Wicks
- Ruby Lacey
- Tanya McKenna
- Taylor Barnett
- Tommy Mallet
- Vas J Morgan
- Yazmin Oukhellou

== Episodes ==
No. overall	No. in series	Title	Original release date	Duration	UK viewers
250	1	"The Only Way Is Marbs, Part 1"	10 September 2017	60 minutes	844,000
With Dan adamant that the relationship between him and Amber T is just casual, he’s unaware of her growing feelings for him. After a summer of bickering, the girl’s meddling finally brings Tommy and Lockie together again as the pair agree to make amends. Elsewhere Chloe S clashes with Pete when she comes face-to-face with him, whilst Courtney lets her insecurities get in the way of her happiness with Myles. Lockie has a proposition for Yaz, and Bobby helps Gemma see another side of Marbella.
251	2	"The Only Way Is Marbs, Part 2"	13 September 2017	50 minutes	778,000
Lauren is delighted when Jon arrives in Marbella to surprise her, as news spreads about their recent date. Chloe S feels Megan and Pete have isolated themselves from the group out of stubbornness, whilst Chloe M introduces her new boyfriend to everybody. Amber T and Megan finally reach out to Chloe M to make amends, but tongues get wagging when Georgia and Amber D feel the extended olive branch is from an ulterior motive. Elsewhere Lockie has an apology to make, and Megan goes to her Mum for advice.
252	3	"Episode 3"	17 September 2017	50 minutes	921,000
Jon surprises Lauren with a romantic picnic date in the woods, but is shocked when she confronts him of rumours she’s heard about his ex-girlfriend. Lockie is faced with the difficult task of winning the approval from Yaz’s father when he’s invited to their family meal. Elsewhere at Bobby’s birthday party, Gemma announces her new plans to save the animals, and Jon discovers it was Mario who started the rumour about him. As Megan and Georgia come face-to-face to discuss the current rift between them, the pair end up clashing over further underlying issues.
253	4	"Episode 4"	20 September 2017	50 minutes	752,000
Jack and Jordan plan a team bonding session for the girls in an attempt to bring Megan and Chloe M back together again. Mario offers support to both Jon and Lauren as both struggle to make the first move with each other. Georgia feels she’s not quite ready to make amends with Megan yet, leaving Yaz and Lockie stuck in the middle of the bickering pair. Elsewhere Bobby isn’t very confident about Gemma’s changed lifestyle, and Jon and Lauren finally agree to give things a go. Amber T breaks down when she fears she’s lost Dan for good.
254	5	"Episode 5"	24 September 2017	50 minutes	826,000
Myles and Courtney’s relationship hits the rocks when her insecurities continue to get in the way, meanwhile the boys take on the girls in a charity baseball event hosted by Gemma. A jealous Dan hears a rumour about Amber T, and he’s forced to make a huge decision about their future. Courtney and Myles face a difficult chat about their recent dramas, as Dan is finally honest with Amber T about his feelings for her.
255	6	"Episode 6"	27 September 2017	50 minutes	656,000
Lauren goes on a date with Jon to decide whether he’s the one for her or not, but is left wary over his ex when she’s enlightened about secret texts he’s been having with her. Courtney is torn as Myles continues to blame Chloe M for their relationship issues, whilst Amber T and Dan take the next step and go on their first date. Bobby decides to become an author, seeking advice from Carol and Joan over what his debut book could be about, and Jordan finds out that Jon has been speaking about him behind his back.
256	7	"Episode 7"	1 October 2017	60 minutes	928,000
With Gemma finding her new vegan lifestyle difficult to stick to, Bobby is there to support her, however she feels she isn’t returning the favour when she’s not interested in hearing about his next new adventure. Jordan confronts Jon over messages he’s seen about him, and Pete and Chloe S finally put an end to the awkwardness. Fed up of the way he’s treating Courtney, Chloe M has no choice but to challenge Myles but is left devastated by personal comments he makes about her relationship. Elsewhere Lauren and Jon reach a good place.
257	8	"Episode 8"	4 October 2017	50 minutes	817,000
Taylor confronts Myles over the rumours he’s been spreading about his relationship with Chloe M, whilst Lockie has some making up to do of his own after upsetting Yaz on a night out. Gemma apologises to Bobby for their recent misunderstanding, meanwhile Lauren fears that her and Jon aren’t as suited together as she originally thought. Liam and Nikki reminisce over the old days, and Chloe M and Courtney have a heart-to-heart. Myles finally offers an olive branch to Chloe M who feels it’s too early for them to move on from the drama.
258	9	"Episode 9"	8 October 2017	50 minutes	868,000
Chloe S gets emotional when her guru tells her she needs to get rid of her tattoo of her ex-boyfriend’s name in order to be free of him completely. Lauren sees a side to Jon she doesn’t like so tells him they’re better off as just friends for now, whilst Dan and Amber T face some difficult questions about their relationship. Elsewhere Liam realises he needs to be more independent, and Myles and Courtney finally get their relationship back on track.
259	10	"Episode 10"	11 October 2017	50 minutes	907,000
Arg returns to Essex with old scores to settle, but Gemma is adamant that she wants nothing more to do with him. Chloe M finally accepts Myles’s apology but makes it clear that they still aren’t friends. Elsewhere Chloe S urges Arg to speak to Gemma and sort out their differences, and Amber T is far from impressed to hear that Dan has arranged a boys trip to Dublin. Lauren gives Jon some hope for their future after hearing that he’s beginning to change his lifestyle, and Gemma and Arg have an emotional reunion.
260	11	"Episode 11"	15 October 2017	50 minutes	945,000
As some of the group head to Dublin, the girls are shocked that Dan didn’t invite Amber T. Jon is left raging after hearing that Mario has been badmouthing his relationship with Lauren, and Pete’s feud with Tommy and Liam is reignited. Amber T’s worst nightmares become reality when she discovers that Dan has been playing around, whilst Gemma and Arg finally call a truce. Elsewhere Jon and Mario come face-to-face, Amber D and Chris hit the rocks, and Dan faces the wrath of Amber T.
261	12	"Episode 12"	18 October 2017	50 minutes	837,000
There’s shockwaves around Essex as news of Pete and Megan’s break-up spreads, and Lockie is there to support his friend. Dan is confronted by Amber T’s angry mother, and Jon isn’t happy with Lauren for taking Mario’s side. Meanwhile Bobby fears that he and Gemma are drifting apart, Pete and Megan finally accept that there’s no going back, and Arg and Diags fight Dan’s corner. Dan finally gets the chance to apologise to Amber T, and time apart makes Lauren realise how much she’s fallen for Jon.
262	13	"Episode 13"	22 October 2017	50 minutes	989,000
Pete’s misery increases when he hears that Megan is possibly back with her ex-boyfriend. Chris and Amber D get their relationship back on track when he surprises her with a trip to New York for Christmas. Words from Charlie bring Gemma and Bobby closer together, whilst Jon has another confrontation with Mike. Elsewhere Pete is delivered another heart-breaking blow when further rumours about Megan surface, and Arg, Dan and Diags learn how to treat ladies properly.
263	14	"Episode 14"	25 October 2017	50 minutes	820,000
Arg is worried that Gemma may want him back after she invites him over for a sleepover. Lauren and Jon hit the rocks again when she realises he may not be the one for her, and Tommy reaches out to Pete in his time of need. Chloe M finally makes amends with Myles for the sake of her friendship with Courtney, whilst Nathan and Cara ask Tommy to be the godfather of their child. Lauren and Jon agree to put their turbulent relationship to rest, and Megan strongly denies the cheating rumours against her.
264	15	"Episode 15"	29 October 2017	60 minutes	910,000
As the group gather at a spooky location for a Halloween party, they’re shocked to discover that it’s actually been arranged by Danni, sending Lockie and Yaz into a spin. Chloe S worries for Gemma and Arg as she notices the pair get even closer, and Pete and Liam finally clear the air. Georgia and Tommy celebrate their anniversary, but she’s worried about spending the rest of her life with him. Elsewhere Danni and Yaz have an awkward confrontation, and Gemma offers herself on a plate to Arg but is sad when he turns down the opportunity for a relationship.
265	16	"Episode 16"	1 November 2017	50 minutes	869,000
After getting back on track with Dan, Amber T begins to panic as she thinks she’s going to get hurt again. Tommy isn’t impressed that Georgia has confided in the girls about her problems rather than coming to him first, whilst Bobby uses his presenting skills to arrange a debate night for Arg, Dan and Diags. Amber T comes to a realisation before telling Dan that they need to cut all ties with each other, and Gemma plans a trip to Tenerife to clear her head but is left more confused when Arg seeks her out for a heart-to-heart.
266	17	"Episode 17"	5 November 2017	50 minutes	970,000
Pete decides he wants to fix things with Chloe S but she tells Tommy that she isn’t ready for his apology just yet. Chris defends Jon when he hears Lauren talk about him behind his back, unaware that what she was saying was the truth, and that Jon has gone back to his ex-girlfriend. Amber T promises to have a more positive outlook on life without Dan, and Lauren is far from impressed when Jon tries to explain his actions. Elsewhere, after months of animosity, Pete and Chloe S finally call a truce.
267	18	"The Only Way Is Essexmas"	17 December 2017	60 minutes	768,000

== Reception ==
=== Ratings ===
Episode	Date	Official ITVBe rating	ITVBe weekly rank	ITVBe+1 viewers	Total ITVBe viewers
Marbs 1	10 September 2017	876,000	1	40,000	916,000
Marbs 2	13 September 2017	794,000	2	47,000	841,000
Episode 3	17 September 2017	948,000	1	42,000	990,000
Episode 4	20 September 2017	824,000	2	44,000	868,000
Episode 5	24 September 2017	843,000	1	48,000	891,000
Episode 6	27 September 2017	715,000	2	22,000	737,000
Episode 7	1 October 2017	957,000	1	36,000	993,000
Episode 8	4 October 2017	838,000	2	33,000	871,000
Episode 9	8 October 2017	855,000	1	43,000	898,000
Episode 10	11 October 2017	889,00	2	19,000	907,000
Episode 11	15 October 2017	874,000	1	71,000	945,000
Episode 12	18 October 2017	782,000	2	55,000	837,000
Episode 13	22 October 2017	923,000	1	66,000	989,000
Episode 14	25 October 2017	781,000	2	39,000	820,000
Episode 15	29 October 2017	858,000	1	52,000	910,000
Episode 16	1 November 2017	780,000	2	89,000	869,000
Episode 17	5 November 2017	923,000	1	47,000	970,000
Essexmas	17 December 2017	741,000	1	27,000	768,000
Series average		851,000		47,000	898,000
