= The Only Way Is Essex series 29 =

The Only Way Is Essex
- Series 29
- No. of episodes: 11

Release
- Original network: ITVBe
- Original release: 21 August – 30 October 2022

Series chronology
- ← Previous; Series 28 Next → Series 30

The twenty-ninth series of the British reality television programme The Only Way Is Essex began airing on 21 August 2022. Filming for the series commenced in June 2022 and was set to begin months prior, but due to the impact of the COVID-19 pandemic on television, it was postponed. For the first time in the show's history, the series was filmed entirely before the series had begun airing, as opposed to filming days prior to transmission. The series will consist of 11 episodes, with two episodes filmed in the Dominican Republic. Filming ended on 18 August 2022 with an episode filmed in Hythe, Kent, that focused on a party for the cast members. Lime Pictures, the show's production company, recruited extras to appear in the background of the episode.

Liam "Gatsby" Blackwell quit The Only Way Is Essex at the conclusion of this series to pursue a career in the United States. Elma Pazar, Hannah Voyan, Junaid Ahmed and Mia Sully were cast on The Only Way Is Essex for the series. Jordan Brook also returned during the series, having previously appeared in 2017. Nine of the cast members who had appeared in the Dominican Republic episodes were thrown off their flight back to the UK and met by police officers, since they had refused to wear masks and were vaping on board. An insider for the series said that the involved cast members were set to receive "short shrift from ITV bosses". The series was the first since 2011 not to feature mainstay Chloe Sims, who quit prior to filming began. Her sisters, Demi and Frankie, quit alongside her.

== Cast ==
- Amber Turner
- Amy Childs
- Bill Delbosq
- Chloe Brockett
- Chloe Meadows
- Clare Brockett
- Courtney Green
- Dan Edgar
- Dani Imbert
- Ella Wise
- Elma Pazar
- Hannah Voyan
- Harry Derbidge
- James "Diags" Bennewith
- James "Lockie" Lock
- Jordan Brook
- Junaid Ahmed
- Liam "Gatsby" Blackwell
- Mia Sully
- Pete Wicks
- Polly Childs-Wright
- Roman Hackett
- Saffron Lempriere
- Yaz Oukhellou

== Episodes ==
No. overall	No. in series	Title	Original release date	Duration
354	1	"Episode 1"	21 August 2022	60 minutes
355	2	"Episode 2"	28 August 2022	60 minutes
356	3	"Episode 3"	4 September 2022	60 minutes
357	4	"Episode 4"	11 September 2022	60 minutes
358	5	"Episode 5"	18 September 2022	60 minutes
359	6	"Episode 6"	25 September 2022	60 minutes
360	7	"Episode 7"	2 October 2022	60 minutes
361	8	"Episode 8"	9 October 2022	60 minutes
362	9	"Episode 9"	16 October 2022	60 minutes
363	10	"Episode 10"	23 October 2022	60 minutes
364	11	"Episode 11"	30 October 2022	60 minutes
