= The Only Way Is Essex series 23 =

The Only Way Is Essex
- Series 23
- No. of episodes: 11

Release
- Original network: ITVBe
- Original release: 2 September – 11 November 2018

Series chronology
- ← Previous; Series 22 Next → Series 24

The twenty-third series of the British reality television programme The Only Way Is Essex began airing on 2 September 2018 with an Italian special as the cast flew off to Sardinia.

Ahead of the series, it was announced that James Argent would be taking a break from the show after recently returning to rehab; however, he never returned to the series. New cast members for this series included Saffron Lempriere, a friend of Gemma Collins', and Sam Mucklow, who is the brother of former cast member Billi Mucklow. Former Love Island contestant Kady McDermott also made her debut during this series, as well as Demi Sims, the sister of Chloe Sims.

== Cast ==
- Adam Oukhellou
- Amber Turner
- Billi Mucklow
- Bobby Cole Norris
- Chloe Lewis
- Chloe Meadows
- Chloe Sims
- Chris Clark
- Clelia Theodorou
- Courtney Green
- Dan Edgar
- Dean Ralph
- Demi Sims
- Gemma Collins
- Georgia Kousoulou
- James "Arg" Argent
- James "Diags" Bennewith
- James "Lockie" Lock
- Joan Collins
- Jon Clark
- Jordan Wright
- Kady McDermott
- Lauren Pope
- Liam Blackwell
- Mike Hassini
- Myles Barnett
- Nikki Blackwell
- Pete Wicks
- Saffron Lempriere
- Sam Mucklow
- Shelby Tribble
- Tommy Mallet
- Yazmin Oukhellou

== Episodes ==
No. overall	No. in series	Title	Original release date	Duration	UK viewers
278	1	"TOWIE: Italia"	2 September 2018	60 minutes	993,000
With some of the group jetting off to Sardinia, Courtney stays at home and mends her broken heart following her recent split from Myles. Tommy opens up to Georgia about his anxiety fears, and Yaz and Lockie remain at each other’s throats. Amber confronts Myles over his treatment towards Courtney, and learns that he’s actually seeing somebody new. Gemma struggles in the absence of Arg, whilst Chloe S reveals that her and Adam never really hit it off. In order to get some closure, Courtney burns all of her memories of Myles. Elsewhere Dan is stuck in the middle of Amber and Myles’s feud.
279	2	"Episode 2"	9 September 2018	60 minutes	1,027,000
Diags and Dan encourage Myles to apologise to Amber, but she feels it’s Courtney who deserves the apology more. Clelia tears up after feeling isolated by the other girls, and fears that Shelby is spending more time with her former love rival Amber rather than with her. Elsewhere Myles and Courtney’s have an emotional confrontation, Gemma decides to plan open auditions for new members of staff, and Chris’s hatred for Myles continues to boil over. Shelby is shocked to hear from Sam that she’s unintentionally been upsetting Clelia.
280	3	"Episode 3"	16 September 2018	60 minutes	1,091,000
Sam is furious to hear that Pete has been talking about him behind his back, whilst Yaz and Lockie feel that Amber only speaks to her when she’s going through some problems with Dan. Elsewhere Shelby has a heart to heart with Clelia before confronting Pete over his treatment of her recently. Myles is confused by Chris’s sudden vendetta against him, Amber and Dan feel Lockie has been negative about their relationship on social media, and Courtney is determined to move on from Myles. Meanwhile Amber and Dan, and Lockie and Yaz go head-to-head as their air their differences.
281	4	"Episode 4"	23 September 2018	60 minutes	1,214,000
The girls turn against Yaz when she hurls personal abuse at Courtney and Chloe M. Chloe S and Lauren make it their mission to get Diags a girlfriend at a singles night, whilst Chris gets closer to Courtney. Lockie meets with Dan to apologise for his actions, where he agrees that Yaz is to blame for their recent problems. Elsewhere Shelby finally confronts Pete over his behaviour before putting drawing a line on their relationship, and Yaz and Amber clash once again. Sam’s hatred towards Pete grows when he learns about the Shelby drama.
282	5	"Episode 5"	30 September 2018	60 minutes	1,133,000
Gemma tries to play match maker by setting Jon and Saffron up on a date, but it doesn’t go to plan when he fails to turn up. With her stress increasing, Yaz decides to leave Essex and go away with he Mum. Pete and Sam finally come face-to-face to settle their differences, whilst Myles’ new girlfriend Kady introduces herself to an emotional Courtney. Yaz makes a heartfelt apology to both Courtney and Chloe M over her recent actions, whilst Lockie worries that her issues are putting strain on their relationship. Elsewhere Diags plans a group trip to Newcastle.
283	6	"Episode 6"	7 October 2018	60 minutes	1,088,000
The Essex gang head to Newcastle where Tommy creates a campaign to get men to open up about their feelings. Elsewhere Adam confronts Amber over the drama with his sister, much to the annoyance of Dan, and Pete is far from happy to hear that Shelby has been bad mouthing him. Courtney’s anger boils over when she comes face-to-face with Myles and lectures him about her chat with Kady, whilst Saffron is underwhelmed with Shelby. Jordan ruffles feathers when he interferes with Amber’s problems, and an emotional Liam reaches out to his Mum after a long separation.
284	7	"Episode 7"	14 October 2018	60 minutes	1,229,000
Gemma gives Jonathan Cheban a tour of Essex. Chloe M opens up about her insecurities and her quest to work on her confidence. Amber feels like she’s betraying Courtney when she heads out on a double date with Myles and Kady, whilst Pete finally clears the air with Shelby following a lecture from Clelia. The men continue to show support for Tommy’s campaign, and Sam admits to fancying Shelby. Gemma plans for the future with Arg after the purchase of a new house goes through, meanwhile Amber makes it clear where her loyalties lie.
285	8	"Episode 8"	21 October 2018	60 minutes	1,016,000
Yaz is welcomed back to Essex but she knows she’s got some making up to do with some of the girls. Amber rages to hear that Dan and Diags have been calling her clingy, and Chloe M takes to the catwalk in an attempt to boost her self-esteem. Elsewhere Saffron and Shelby clash, Kady plays Cupid and helps find Diags a date, and Tommy and Georgia discuss their future. Dan has some explaining to do to Amber, and Yaz is forced into an uncomfortable conversation with Lockie when he discusses their ongoing issues, before she shocks him with an ultimatum.
286	9	"Episode 9"	28 October 2018	60 minutes	1,152,000
Sam visits his sister Billi for some much needed dating advice where he reveals that it may not be Shelby he currently has his eye on. Yaz and Amber have an emotional reunion where they iron out their differences, and Diags’ date doesn’t go to plan when he realises there’s no chemistry. Yaz and Lockie decide to make a list of rules to follow in their relationship. Elsewhere Tommy sets up a number of surprises for Georgia on their anniversary, Liam and Pete decide to put an end to their long-running feud, and Diags is hit with the fact that he will have to let his date down gently.
287	10	"Episode 10"	4 November 2018	60 minutes	1,128,000
Kady and Courtney’s feud is reignited when Courtney’s comments about Jodie become public knowledge, and Dan is torn over which rival friends to invite to his and Amber’s dinner party. Saffron receives some driving lessons from Pete, but Bobby feels there’s more than meets the eye. Sam assures Shelby that they’re nothing more than friends before asking Lauren out on a date, meanwhile Pete gives Courtney some tough love when her recent problems come to light. At the bonfire, things turn nasty between the girls when Kady confronts Courtney leaving Myles to pick up the pieces.
288	11	"Episode 11"	11 November 2018	60 minutes	1,166,000
Liam receives a huge shock when his Mum briefly returns home to surprise him. Amber feels she’s being mistreated when Dan fails to stand by her during her recently arguments, unaware he just wants the quiet life. Lauren is wined and dined by Sam during their first date. Courtney and Kady agree to squash their feud she Kady reveals her problem is now more with Amber, and Chloe S introduces her sister to the Essex gang at Pete’s 30th birthday party. Elsewhere Lauren agrees to go on a secret date with Sam, and Chloe S and Pete reminisce.

== Reception ==
=== Ratings ===
For the first time, catch-up service totals were added to the official ratings.

Episode	Date	Total ITVBe viewers
TOWIE: Italia	2 September 2018	993,000
Episode 2	9 September 2018	1,027,000
Episode 3	16 September 2018	1,091,000
Episode 4	23 September 2018	1,214,000
Episode 5	30 September 2018	1,133,000
Episode 6	7 October 2018	1,088,000
Episode 7	14 October 2018	1,229,000
Episode 8	21 October 2018	1,016,000
Episode 9	28 October 2018	1,152,000
Episode 10	4 November 2018	1,128,000
Episode 11	11 November 2018	1,166,000
Series average		1,112,000
