= The Only Way Is Essex series 27 =

The Only Way Is Essex
- Series 27
- No. of episodes: 11

Release
- Original network: ITVBe
- Original release: 14 March – 23 May 2021

Series chronology
- ← Previous; Series 26 Next → Series 28

The twenty-seventh series of the British reality television programme The Only Way Is Essex began airing on 14 March 2021, and concluded following eleven episodes on 23 May. This series returned to airing just one episode per week, and like the previous series, it was filmed with social distancing measures in place to protect both cast and crew from Coronavirus. Despite filming for this series taking place during a national lockdown, some restaurants and pubs opened especially for the show. Ahead of the series it was announced that cast member Yazmin Oukhellou had quit the show to focus on a new career. It was also confirmed that Rem Larue had joined the cast instead. This series also features the arrivals of new cast members Dani Imbert and Roman Hackett. as well as the departures of Georgia Kousoulou, Tommy Mallet and Joey Turner.

== Cast ==
- Amber Turner
- Amy Childs
- Bobby Cole Norris
- Charlie Sims
- Chloe Brockett
- Chloe Meadows
- Chloe Sims
- Clelia Theodorou
- Courtney Green
- Dan Edgar
- Demi Sims
- Dani Imbert
- Ella Wise
- Frankie Sims
- Georgia Kousoulou
- Harry Derbidge
- Harry Lee
- James "Diags" Bennewith
- James "Lockie" Lock
- Joey Turner
- Kelsey Stratford
- Liam Blackwell
- Nicole Bass
- Pete Wicks
- Polly Childs-Wright
- Rem Larue
- Roman Hackett
- Saffron Lempriere
- Tom McDonnell
- Tommy Mallet

== Episodes ==
No. overall	No. in series	Title	Original release date	Duration	UK viewers
331	1	"Episode 1"	14 March 2021	60 minutes	592,000
Harry D feels uneasy with Amy spending so much time with Bobby, meanwhile Harry L announces he’s turning celibate. Chloe S reveals she’s over Pete and just wants to move on with her life, Clelia has eyes on new boy Rem, and Diags trains to break a world record. Saffron and Chloe B go head-to-head in another explosive row, whilst Georgia and Tommy prepare Monkey for the birth of their child, and Demi reveals her new relationship. Saffron is hurt by Chloe B’s personal comments, and Ella opens up about a spark between her and Pete following a recent kiss.
332	2	"Episode 2"	21 March 2021	60 minutes	524,000
Ella spills the tea on her flirtatious friendship with Pete, but she’s unaware the feelings aren’t reciprocated. Liam reconnects with an old flame on his blind date, whilst Clelia and Rem hit it off on their first date. Chloe B takes Harry L to feed the tigers in order to build trust with each other again, Kelsey cuts Ella out of her life, and Saffron confronts Chloe M over alleged comments made about her. Elsewhere Harry D is wary of Amy’s friendship with Bobby, and she desperately tries to resolve the issue between the warring exes.
333	3	"Episode 3"	28 March 2021	60 minutes	595,000
Bobby feels that Amy should stand by the truth about Harry D’s past infidelity rather than stand by her family, but Chloe S defends her decision. Amber feels betrayed by Courtney and Chloe M spending time with Clelia, and declines their invitation to join them. Liam and Dani get closer on their second date, whilst Ella confronts Pete over him playing down their relationship to others. Bobby tells Amy he’s taking a break from Essex to escape the drama, and Clelia feels that Amber is causing more problems by not putting the past behind her. Elsewhere Nicole has a failed attempt at getting Ella and Kelsey to reconnect.
334	4	"Episode 4"	4 April 2021	60 minutes	618,000
Kelsey comes under fire when the girls accuse her of going from group to group, whilst Amy makes it her mission to find out the truth from Harry D about his feud with Bobby. Elsewhere Amber dismisses any chance of being civil with Clelia, and Saffron offers Ella some friendly advice regarding Pete. Harry D makes a confession to Amy, Frankie confronts Pete for not being entirely honest about his relationship with Ella, and Demi tries to integrate her new girlfriend Frankie into the Essex clan. Nicole feels stuck between warring friends, and Clelia and Amber have another explosive encounter during an Easter egg hunt.
335	5	"Episode 5"	11 April 2021	60 minutes	607,000
Courtney and Chloe M feel guilty for inadvertently reigniting the feud between Amber and Clelia. Dani tries to set Ella up with her friend Roman despite Pete still being firmly in the picture. Elsewhere Amber questions Courtney and Chloe M’s loyalties, and Kelsey isn’t sure which of the girls she can trust. Nicole challenges Chloe B over tweets made about her, Harry D celebrates his birthday in style, and Chloe S begins the next chapter of her life by going house hunting. Courtney and Chloe M reassure Amber that their friendship with her won’t be affected by Clelia.
336	6	"Episode 6"	18 April 2021	60 minutes	606,000
Lockie returns for a long overdue catch-up with Pete. Chloe S decides to seek help for her anxiety after turning down a big business opportunity due to her fears. Frankie becomes lost without Demi when she spends more and more time with Francesca, and Liam and Dani make their relationship official. Saffron takes matter into her own hands to find out what Harry D has been hiding, whilst sparks fly during Ella and Roman’s date. Elsewhere, Diag’s opens up about his brother’s recent health scare, Frankie pours her heart out to Demi, and Harry D continues to deny being a cheat.
337	7	"Episode 7"	25 April 2021	60 minutes	541,000
Clelia worries that the initial spark with Rem has fizzled out so is left with a big decision to make. Elsewhere Saffron isn’t happy with indirect comments Amy’s made about her, and Chloe B and Frankie finally lay their feud to rest. Harry L and Tom visit a mortgage advisor before realising a joint mortgage isn’t right for them. Clelia feels she’s dodged a bullet when Rem reacts badly to her calling it a day, whilst Demi has news to share about her breakup with Francesca. Battle lines are drawn between Bobby and the Sims sisters when he lashes out at Frankie for defending Harry D.
338	8	"Episode 8"	2 May 2021	60 minutes	538,000
Georgia plans her baby shower ahead of her C-section. Nicole lays into Rem for his behaviour towards Clelia, whilst Bobby fears the wrath of the Sims sisters. Chloe M worries Ella may be using Roman to make Pete jealous, and warns him to be wary of her, meanwhile new boy Tommy C catches Frankie’s eye. Bobby is under attack when Chloe S confronts him over comments made about her family, Ella challenges Chloe M about what she’s told Roman, and Nicole makes amends with Kelsey. Georgia is overcome with emotion as she enters the next chapter in her life.
339	9	"Episode 9"	9 May 2021	60 minutes	570,000
Chloe M is frustrated to hear that Liam hasn’t been defending her against Ella’s allegations. Saffron makes amends with Amy in an attempt to end all the drama in her life, whilst Rem and Clelia put the past behind them and agree to be friends again. Courtney lets slip a piece of damning information about Liam’s relationship, Frankie enjoys her first date with Tommy C, and Amy hosts a birthday party for her daughter Polly. Chloe S stands her ground and refuses to accept Bobby’s olive branch, meanwhile Ella is on the receiving end of Chloe M’s rage when tension between the pair increases.
340	10	"Episode 10"	16 May 2021	60 minutes	591,000
Nicole encourages Kelsey to allow Ella to build bridges with her. Courtney defends herself when accused of maliciously targeting Liam’s relationship, whilst Roman reassures Chloe M that her passing comment about him has been blown out of proportion. Amy and Bobby come to blows once again, Diags reattempts a World Record, and Saffron arranges an art class for the girls. Joey makes a big decision regarding his career, revealing to Chloe B that he’s leaving Essex to start a new adventure. Elsewhere Liam lashes out at Courtney, and Kelsey and Ella clear the air.
341	11	"Episode 11"	23 May 2021	60 minutes	539,000
Chloe S stresses about organising Diags’ 30th birthday party, meanwhile a toast is raised in Joey’s honour ahead of his departure from Essex. Dan is concerned that Liam is letting his fallout with the girls come between their friendship after hearing he’s taken swipe at Amber. Kelsey is forced into the middle of a feuding Chloe B and Ella once again, whilst Courtney questions Dani as to why she’s posted about her on social media. Following an emotional chat, Chloe S finally gets the closure she needed from Pete, and Diags discovers he’s a Guinness World Records holder.

== Ratings ==
Catch-up service totals were added to the official ratings.

Episode	Date	Total ITVBe viewers
Episode 1	14 March 2021	592,000
Episode 2	21 March 2021	524,000
Episode 3	28 March 2021	595,000
Episode 4	4 April 2021	618,000
Episode 5	11 April 2021	607,000
Episode 6	18 April 2021	606,000
Episode 7	25 April 2021	541,000
Episode 8	2 May 2021	538,000
Episode 9	9 May 2021	570,000
Episode 10	16 May 2021	591,000
Episode 11	30 May 2021	539,000
Series average		575,000
