= The Only Way Is Essex series 30 =

Episodes of the thirtieth series of the British reality television programme

The Only Way Is Essex
- Series 30
- No. of episodes: 10

Release
- Original network: ITVBe
- Original release: 26 March – 28 May 2023

Series chronology
- ← Previous; Series 29 Next → Series 31

The thirtieth series of the British reality television programme The Only Way Is Essex began airing on 26 March 2023. Filming for the series commenced in January 2023, with a number of episodes set in Thailand.

Pete Wicks and Liam "Gatsby" Blackwell, who had appeared as main cast members since the fifteenth and sixteenth series' respectively, announced their departure from the show after seven years. Yaz Oukhellou also departed from the series after being involved in a car accident that resulted in the death of her boyfriend, Jake McLean. Mia Sully and Hannah Voyan, who made their debut in the previous series, did not return either after reportedly being axed from the show. Former Geordie Shore cast member and television personality Sophie Kasaei joined the cast as the girlfriend of Jordan Brook.

== Cast ==
- Amber Turner
- Amy Childs
- Bill Delbosq
- Chloe Brockett
- Chloe Meadows
- Clare Brockett
- Courtney Green
- Dan Edgar
- Dani Imbert
- Ella Wise
- Elma Pazar
- Harry Derbidge
- James "Diags" Bennewith
- James "Lockie" Lock
- Jordan Brook
- Junaid Ahmed
- Polly Childs-Wright
- Roman Hackett
- Saffron Lempriere
- Sophie Kasaei

== Episodes ==
No. overall	No. in series	Title	Original release date	Duration
365	1	"Episode 1"	26 March 2023	60 minutes
366	2	"Episode 2"	2 April 2023	60 minutes
367	3	"Episode 3"	9 April 2023	60 minutes
368	4	"Episode 4"	16 April 2023	60 minutes
369	5	"Episode 5"	23 April 2023	60 minutes
370	6	"Episode 6"	30 April 2023	60 minutes
371	7	"Episode 7"	7 May 2023	60 minutes
372	8	"Episode 8"	14 May 2023	60 minutes
373	9	"Episode 9"	21 May 2023	60 minutes
374	10	"Episode 10"	28 May 2023	60 minutes
