= The Only Way Is Essex series 28 =

The Only Way Is Essex
- Series 28
- No. of episodes: 12

Release
- Original network: ITVBe
- Original release: 12 September – 14 November 2021

Series chronology
- ← Previous; Series 27 Next → Series 29

The twenty-eighth series of the British reality television programme The Only Way Is Essex began airing on 12 September 2021, and concluded on 14 November following 10 episodes. A further two "Essexmas" special episodes aired on 15 and 16 December. Ahead of the series, it was announced that the show would be evolving with some changes, including axing a number of cast members to therefore focus on a smaller group of cast and allow more time to film their real lives, such as their bonds between family and friends. Cast members confirmed to be axed were Chloe Meadows, Clelia Theodorou, Courtney Green, Ella Wise, Harry Derbidge, Harry Lee, Kelsey Stratford, Nicole Bass, Rem Larue, and Tom McDonnell; joining Georgia Kousoulou, Tommy Mallett, and Joey Turner, who had already previously announced they had quit. Bobby Cole Norris also announced that he had quit the series but would be presenting "TOWIE: The Official After Party", a new online spin-off series.

Yazmin Oukhellou also made her return to the series during the premiere. Despite having been axed from the show, Meadows, Green, Wise and Derbidge made brief guest appearances throughout the series alongside Frankie Essex, Georgia Kousoulou, Tommy Mallet, and Nikki Blackwell, who also made minor appearances. The series included appearances from two former Love Island stars Joe Garett and Jack Fincham, and new cast members Angel Bo-Stanley and Bill Delbosq also made their debut.

== Cast ==
- Amber Turner
- Amy Childs
- Angel Bo-Stanley
- Bill Delbosq
- Chloe Brockett
- Chloe Meadows
- Chloe Sims
- Clare Brockett
- Courtney Green
- Dan Edgar
- Demi Sims
- Dani Imbert
- Ella Wise
- Frankie Essex
- Frankie Sims
- Georgia Kousoulou
- Harry Derbidge
- James "Diags" Bennewith
- James "Lockie" Lock
- Liam Blackwell
- Nikki Blackwell
- Pete Wicks
- Polly Childs-Wright
- Roman Hackett
- Saffron Lempriere
- Tommy Mallet
- Yazmin Oukhellou

== Episodes ==
No. overall	No. in series	Title	Original release date	Duration	UK viewers
342	1	"Episode 1"	12 September 2021	60 minutes	394,000
The clan head to Sandbanks for some sun by the coast with rumours of Chloe B’s recent fling with Lockie spreading through the group. Diags and Roman compete for Demi’s attention, whilst Amy reflects on being newly single. Saffron questions Chloe B’s loyalties to Lockie’s ex-girlfriend Yaz, and Amber and Liam agree to put their past feud behind them. Liam opens up to the girls about wanting to ask Dani to be his girlfriend, meanwhile Chloe B heads back home to Essex to confront Lockie over his version of events.
343	2	"Episode 2"	19 September 2021	60 minutes	422,000
Chloe B meets up with Lockie to find out whether he really regrets their night together. Dan continues to feel awkward in the presence of the Sims sisters, and Diags comes up with a tactical plan to get them on good terms again. Elsewhere, Saffron searches for love at a singles night, Roman pursues Demi, and Liam teaches Dani how to ride a bike. Lockie is floored when Yaz makes a surprise appearance at the singles night, and Chloe S rejects Diags’ attempts at mending the rift between her and Amber.
344	3	"Episode 3"	26 September 2021	60 minutes	447,000
Following a family tragedy, Liam looks to the future and how he’d love for Dani to be in it. Saffron confides in Amy about her worries about getting back on the dating scene, whilst Lockie receives an opportunity of a lifetime regarding his new career. Demi reaches out to invite Amber and Dan to her pride birthday party, but Chloe S isn’t too keen. Elsewhere Roman and Diags up the ante in their competition to win Demi’s heart, and Dan tells the Sims sisters he’s grateful for their olive branch towards him.
345	4	"Episode 4"	3 October 2021	60 minutes	424,000
Chloe B revels in telling the girls that she’s heard from the grapevine that Dani and Liam have been having problems in their love life. Demi fears she’s not ready to put a label on her sexuality, whilst Diags offers his full support either way. Elsewhere, Saffron’s confidence is boosted following a date with Phil, Chloe B’s anxious about not feeling accepted by the group, and Frankie S and Demi take their first step to becoming professional DJs. Liam pulls out all the stops to wow Dani before finally asking her to be his girlfriend.
346	5	"Episode 5"	10 October 2021	60 minutes	355,000
Dani and Liam accuse Chloe B of attempting to tear their relationship apart by spreading false rumours about them, whilst Roman has a plan to keep the peace within the group. Pete comes up with a solution to help Chloe S overcome her fears, and Amy sets the wheels in motion for her new business venture. Elsewhere, Frankie S enjoys her first date with Joe, Diags arranges a photo shoot to promote his business, and Chloe B and Dani come to blows following Roman’s failed effort at getting the pair to see eye to eye.
347	6	"Episode 6"	17 October 2021	60 minutes	430,000
Chloe S is overjoyed when she’s offered a role as a make-up artist in Paris Fashion Week. Elsewhere Pete plans a retreat for the singles in the group where Demi struggles to come to terms with her sexuality. Amber and Dan’s respective parents meet for the first time, and Demi worries if Chloe B’s vendetta against Liam is to do with her chequered past with him. The boys show off their new skills during speed dating, Frankie S admits she wants to explore her options despite her date with Joe, and Chloe B is baffled by Demi’s accusation.
348	7	"Episode 7"	24 October 2021	60 minutes	490,000
Yaz is back and instantly clears the air with Chloe B following her recent fling with Lockie. Saffron meets up with her ex-boyfriend for some closure in order to move on with her life, and Frankie S is unsure on whether to take things further with Joe after mixed reviews from her family. There’s tension during Diags and Roman’s double date, whilst Chloe B questions Amy’s loyalties, and Saffron hosts a breast cancer awareness night for charity. Dani integrates herself into Liam’s friendship group, and Lockie announces he’s met somebody new.
349	8	"Episode 8"	31 October 2021	60 minutes	434,000
Yaz admits she’s got no intention of making up with Amber anytime soon. Frankie S decides to call it day with Joe, and Amy suspects that Lockie is still in love with Yaz following a mysterious phone call. Frankie S and Chloe B’s feud reaches new heights when messages from a shared ex come to light. Elsewhere Dani spends time with Liam’s friends in an attempt to get to know them better, Angel catches Diags’ eye, and Jack’s arrival instantly stirs up trouble between an already warring Chloe B and Frankie S.
350	9	"Episode 9"	7 November 2021	60 minutes	411,000
Chloe and Frankie S’s latest bust-up is the talk of Essex. Amber accuses Jack of selling dreams to Frankie S, whilst Chloe B urges him to tell Frankie S the truth. Dani is delighted to be accepted by Liam’s mother Nikki, Harry opens up to Amy about his recent breakup, and Pete has some bad news regarding Chloe S’s upcoming birthday party. Jack finally holds his hands up to Frankie S and admits he hasn’t been completely honest, and Amy tells Chloe B she’s fed up of being stuck in the middle of the bickering girls.
351	10	"Episode 10"	14 November 2021	60 minutes	431,000
Chloe B decides it’s time to explore life outside of Essex and work on herself and her new business. Dani regrets confiding in Roman about her recent arguments with Liam when he tells Saffron they’re not right for each other. Chloe S is overcome with emotions following Diags’ speech at her 40th birthday party, and Pete has a surprise of his own for her. Amber and Dan feel it’s nice they can be included in a Sims celebration for a change, Amy introduces her new boyfriend to the gang, and Liam and Roman come to blows.
352	11	"The Only Way is Essexmas, Part 1"	15 December 2021	60 minutes	305,000
Amy feels blessed as everything in her life continues to fall into place. Dani meets up with Ella to confide in her about the recent dramas in her life, whilst Courtney and Chloe M return for a catch-up with Amber and Chloe B. Tongues wag as news of Dani and Roman’s past kiss comes to light much to Liam’s dismay, and Chloe S and Lockie visit the elderly for Christmas at Age UK. Dani questions why Saffron is getting involved in her relationship problems, meanwhile Diags enjoys another fun date with Angel.
353	12	"The Only Way is Essexmas, Part 2"	16 December 2021	60 minutes	265,000
Chloe M and Courtney refuse to accept Liam’s olive branch as they doubt the sincerity of his apology. The boys worry that Liam doesn’t know the full extent of Dani and Roman’s romantic past but Dani assures them he’s just saving face. Amy prepares for her first Christmas with her new boyfriend, whereas Diags questions whether there’s a spark between him and Angel. Dani sees red when she realises her love life is the talk of Essex again, and Diags and Angel finally share their first kiss.

== Ratings ==
Catch-up service totals were added to the official ratings.

Episode	Date	Total ITVBe viewers
Episode 1	12 September 2021	394,000
Episode 2	19 September 2021	422,000
Episode 3	26 September 2021	447,000
Episode 4	3 October 2021	424,000
Episode 5	10 October 2021	355,000
Episode 6	17 October 2021	430,000
Episode 7	24 October 2021	490,000
Episode 8	31 October 2021	434,000
Episode 9	7 November 2021	411,000
Episode 10	14 November 2021	431,000
Essexmas 1	15 December 2021	305,000
Essexmas 2	16 December 2021	265,000
Series average		401,000
