= The Only Way Is Essex series 20 =

The Only Way Is Essex
- Series 20
- No. of episodes: 18

Release
- Original network: ITVBe
- Original release: 5 March – 3 May 2017

Series chronology
- ← Previous; Series 19 Next → Series 21

The twentieth series of the British reality television programme The Only Way Is Essex was confirmed on 3 June 2015 when it was announced that it had renewed for at least a further six series, taking it up to 21 series. The series launched on 5 March with the cast going to Tenerife, and concluded on 3 May 2017 after eighteen episodes, making this the longest series to date. Mario Falcone, Jamie Reed and Charlie King all returned during the series. Lauren Pope also made a return to the series during the final episode. This was the final series of original cast member Lydia Bright as well as her mother, Debbie Douglas. This is also the final series of Carole Wright.

This was the first series to include new cast members Amber Turner, Myles Barnett, Yazmin Oukhellou, Jack Rigden, Jordan Brook and Jade Lewis. This was the final series to include cast members Ben Shenel and Ercan Ramadan, as well as Kate Wright who announced her departure ahead of the final episode. This series focused on the end of the line for the relationship between Megan McKenna and Pete Wicks, a divide forming following the fallout between Chloe Sims and Megan, as well as Gemma Collins focusing her attention on having a baby.

== Cast ==
- Amber Dowding
- Amber Turner
- Ben Shenel
- Bobby Cole Norris
- Carol Wright
- Charlie King
- Chloe Lewis
- Chloe Meadows
- Chloe Sims
- Chris Clark
- Courtney Green
- Dan Edgar
- Debbie Douglas
- Ercan Ramadan
- Fran Parman
- Gemma Collins
- Georgia Kousoulou
- Jack Rigden
- Jade Lewis
- James "Diags" Bennewith
- James "Lockie" Lock
- Jamie Reed
- Jordan Brook
- Joan Collins
- Jon Clark
- Kate Wright
- Lauren Pope
- Liam Blackwell
- Lydia Bright
- Mario Falcone
- Megan McKenna
- Milly McKenna
- Myles Barnett
- Nikki Blackwell
- Pete Wicks
- Tommy Mallet
- Yazmin Oukhellou

== Episodes ==
No. overall	No. in series	Title	Original release date	Duration	UK viewers
232	1	"Episode 1"	5 March 2017	60 minutes	1,107,000
The group head to Tenerife where new girl Amber T is thrown into drama when rumours transpire that she has slept with Dan despite having a boyfriend back at home. There’s tension between Liam and Chloe S following a recent fling, and the pair have an emotional heart-to-heart where he reveals he wants to be more than friends. Chris advises his friend Myles against getting into a relationship with Courtney, Gemma spends her birthday in hospital, and Megan is furious to hear Liam spreading rumours about Amber T and Dan causing a big bust-up between the boys when Pete defends his girlfriend.
233	2	"Episode 2"	8 March 2017	50 minutes	1,055,000
Courtney is far from impressed to hear that Chris has been bad mouthing her to Myles, and the girls are embarrassed by the boy’s recent behaviour in Tenerife. Gemma expresses her desperate desire to have a baby before it’s too late. Following more rumours that Dan and Amber T have spent the night together back in Essex, Jamie reaches the final straw, and Megan is fed up of supporting her friend. Lockie grills Dan in an attempt to find out what really happened, and Courtney feels rejected by Myles as she makes a big gesture towards him.
234	3	"Episode 3"	12 March 2017	50 minutes	1,166,000
The boys receive a shock when Dan admits to kissing Amber T, and feels he needs to have a chat with Jamie to clear the air. Chloe S is the voice of reason for Pete and Megan as they try to work through more troubles, meanwhile Courtney is still gutted as she thinks Myles has rejected her. Lydia is furious when she returns to Essex to learn that Gemma slept with Arg behind her back last year, Dan meets Jamie to give him an explanation, and Liam and Pete clash again after both refusing to apologise to each other. Elsewhere Liam feels Chloe S gave him mixed signals, and Amber T fails to convince Jamie that nothing happened between her and Dan – unaware that he already knows the truth.
235	4	"Episode 4"	15 March 2017	50 minutes	1,102,000
Megan finally offers Amber T the support she needs. Myles goes one better than Courtney and makes a huge gesture to ask her to be his girlfriend, and Chloe M is a shoulder to cry on for Jamie. Mario gives Chloe S some much needed advice over her drama with Liam, whilst Gemma is nervous when she hears that Lydia has found about her fling with Arg. Lockie reveals that he’s liking where things are going with Yaz, elsewhere Gemma and Lydia agree to let their past with Arg go. Tommy and Georgia host a St Patrick’s Day themed party where Nathan Massey and Cara De La Hoyde attend.
236	5	"Episode 5"	19 March 2017	60 minutes	1,087,000
The gang head to London for the day where Bobby faces another fear by scaling the O2 Arena, and Courtney plans a bonding session for herself, Myles, Jon and Chris in an attempt to clear the air. After hearing that Yaz is already thinking about settling down together, Lockie fears that the relationship may be moving too quickly, and gossip about Chloe M and Jamie’s meeting spreads around the group. Elsewhere Gemma gives Jon a shock proposition, Amber T and Chloe M have an almighty confrontation about Jamie, and Kate makes her feelings towards Amber T clear as she catches her having breakfast with Dan.
237	6	"Episode 6"	22 March 2017	50 minutes	968,000
Amber T feels uncomfortable with the group, whilst the girls think she owes Kate an apology for going with Dan with no explanation. Yaz arranges for the couples to go out for a meal together but is left hurt when Georgia and Tommy don’t show up, fearing she could never be friends with them due to Georgia being so close to Lockie’s ex. Elsewhere Myles begins to think Courtney is high maintenance, Megan and Pete clash on their anniversary, Gemma visits a specialist over her mission to freeze her eggs, and Chloe L reveals a shock secret about Dan.
238	7	"Episode 7"	26 March 2017	60 minutes	1,022,000
Megan and Pete reach breaking point as their bickering continues during their romantic meal together. Charlie returns to Essex to offer support to Gemma, whilst Georgia learns that Yaz and Amber T have had a lot to say about her. Elsewhere, Kate feels uneasy after Chloe L’s confession about her past kiss with Dan, and Liam isn’t sure what to make of Jon and Chloe S going stargazing together. Georgia has no choice but to confront Amber T and Yaz, whilst Megan seeks help from her Mum when she fears that there’s no way back for her and Pete.
239	8	"Episode 8"	29 March 2017	50 minutes	929,000
With Chloe L’s recent revelation about her and Dan becoming the talk of Essex, Kate decides she wants nothing more to do with her. Elsewhere Jon has some explaining to do to Liam, and Chloe S feels all friendship with Liam is destroyed by him dictating who she can and can’t speak to. Courtney isn’t happy with Myles going on a boys holiday, and Gemma’s new fitness regime begins. Charlie and Bobby’s reunion doesn’t go to plan when they realise things will never be the same again, and Pete and Megan finally call it a day on their relationship.
240	9	"Episode 9"	2 April 2017	50 minutes	1,017,000
Lockie makes plans with the boys to try and cheer Pete up following his break up from Megan. Jamie is back in Essex and agrees to meet with Amber T to get some closure, but the pair end up bickering instead. Elsewhere Chloe L feels that her confession has been blown massively out of proportion by Kate and attempts to clear the air with her, and Bobby is offended by a comment made by Charlie about his body. Meanwhile Jon expresses hatred about Dan, and Chloe S finally loses patience with Liam when he comes round for a chat.
241	10	"Episode 10"	5 April 2017	50 minutes	1,000,000
As Gemma seeks advice from Debbie about fostering a child, Joan breaks down after thinking about her past. Lockie’s recent night out with Pete is the talk of Essex as Yaz fears her boyfriend may have cheated on her. Meanwhile Charlie apologises to Bobby for upsetting him, and rumours spread about Megan going back to an after party with her ex. Courtney plays nurse to Myles after dislocating his shoulder, Chloe L tries to get her head around her fallout with Kate, and Dan finally apologises to Jamie for his new relationship with Amber T.
242	11	"Episode 11"	9 April 2017	50 minutes	1,139,000
When pictures of Chloe S and Pete in a compromising position come to light, Megan feels her friend owes her an explanation. The group head to Amsterdam where Gemma uses it as an opportunity to take her mind off the egg freezing, and Yaz and Georgia clear the air. Back in Essex Chris urges Courtney to tell Myles the truth about her contacting her ex again, but Myles is more hurt that his friends kept the information from him for weeks. Amber T receives a shock when she catches Jamie out on a date, and Chloe S fears Megan has the wrong end of the stick.
243	12	"Episode 12"	12 April 2017	50 minutes	1,039,000
Dan’s comments about being single causes animosity between him and Amber T, and Mario gives Chloe S some much needed advice on how to handle Megan. Chloe M meets with Myles in order to explain Courtney’s actions to him. Megan and Pete have another explosive argument as they agree that they can’t even be civil with each other, and Chloe S rages that Megan has dragged her into the equation. Elsewhere Bobby hosts an Essex related quiz, Jamie reveals he’s now happy with Jade, and Myles tells Courtney he still needs some space.
244	13	"Episode 13"	16 April 2017	50 minutes	994,000
Gemma hosts an Easter ball as a further distraction to the issues in her life but Charlie worries over her choice of food at the party. The boys are startled to learn that Lockie is already house hunting with Yaz, whilst Chris and Myles call a truce. Lockie gives Yaz some tough love when she fears that people think their relationship is moving too quickly. Courtney seeks help from Jack and Jordan in order to win Myles back, and Chloe S and Megan finally come face-to-face, but their attempt to settle their differences goes terribly wrong.
245	14	"Episode 14"	19 April 2017	50 minutes	967,000
Some of the group go glamping but it’s not long before Gemma packs her bags and heads home, whilst Courtney and Myles get cosy again. Tommy offers support to Nathan when he reveals he’s recently split from Cara. Chloe M realises she might have the hots for Jack, and Yaz tears up after hearing what some of the boys have been saying about her. Lockie assures Yaz that she can trust him, a divide forms between the group as battle lines are drawn between Chloe S and Megan, and Lydia shares some ghost stories.
246	15	"Episode 15"	23 April 2017	50 minutes	1,041,000
Despite being civil again with Pete, Megan still doesn’t understand why other people are having opinions on her decisions. Tommy does all he can to cheer Nathan up, whilst Courtney vows to get a job in order to distract herself from Myles. Amber T confronts Jamie after hearing he’s still been talking about her, and Debbie celebrates her birthday with a 60s themed party. Elsewhere Chloe S is drained over her recent dramas and decides against rebuilding her friendship with Megan. Old feelings for Chris and Amber D return, and Amber T and Chloe M face off again.
247	16	"Episode 16"	26 April 2017	50 minutes	1,080,000
Pete turns his back on Chloe S as she refuses to have any sort of contact with Megan. Amber D is smitten following a date with Chris, and Lydia walks in on Debbie and Carol drawing a naked Bobby. Georgia and Tommy infuriate Megan by defending Chloe S. Meanwhile Pete has some harsh words for Tommy, Courtney goes job hunting, and Chloe M reveals she’s finally ready to make amends with Megan after months of feuding. Mario is there for Chloe S in her time of need, and Chris fears his family won’t fully support his decision to get back with Amber D.
248	17	"Episode 17"	30 April 2017	50 minutes	1,125,000
As the launch of Megan’s new bar approaches, everybody receives an invite but Chloe M doesn’t feel that she’ll be welcome. Gemma, Lydia and Bobby get lessons on dating in order to find Mr Right, whilst Pete admits he regrets ever turning to Chloe S for advice. Tommy’s argument with Pete is the talk of Essex as the boys are torn over whom to side with, whilst Megan is upset that Courtney rejects her launch party invite in order to spend the night with Chloe M. Pete decides to bite the bullet and meet Chloe S only to receive some harsh home truths from her.
249	18	"Episode 18"	3 May 2017	50 minutes	1,003,000
Chloe L tries to rekindle an old friendship. Megan fails to understand Courtney’s reasons for not attending her launch night. Liam reaches out to Chloe S to let her know that he is supporting her, whilst Yaz and Georgia are shocked by their feuding boyfriends. Lauren Pope arrives at Dan’s birthday party where it’s clear they have unfinished business leaving Amber T raging. Jon learns that Lockie has been bitching about him, Kate and Dan are finally civil with each other, and Chloe M reaches out to Megan but the pair end up bickering again.

== Reception ==
=== Ratings ===
Episode	Date	Official ITVBe rating	ITVBe weekly rank	ITVBe+1 viewers	Total ITVBe viewers
Episode 1	5 March 2017	1,050,000	1	57,000	1,107,000
Episode 2	8 March 2017	970,000	2	85,000	1,055,000
Episode 3	12 March 2017	1,105,000	1	61,000	1,166,000
Episode 4	15 March 2017	992,000	2	110,000	1,102,000
Episode 5	19 March 2017	1,015,000	1	72,000	1,087,000
Episode 6	22 March 2017	904,000	2	64,000	968,000
Episode 7	26 March 2017	950,000	1	72,000	1,022,000
Episode 8	29 March 2017	877,000	2	52,000	929,000
Episode 9	2 April 2017	946,000	1	71,000	1,017,000
Episode 10	5 April 2017	920,000	2	80,000	1,000,000
Episode 11	9 April 2017	1,076,000	1	63,000	1,139,000
Episode 12	12 April 2017	977,000	1	62,000	1,039,000
Episode 13	16 April 2017	918,000	2	76,000	994,000
Episode 14	19 April 2017	888,000	2	79,000	967,000
Episode 15	23 April 2017	965,000	1	76,000	1,041,000
Episode 16	26 April 2017	996,000	2	84,000	1,080,000
Episode 17	30 April 2017	1,021,000	1	104,000	1,125,000
Episode 18	3 May 2017	924,000	1	79,000	1,003,000
Series average		972,000	1	75,000	1,047,000
