= The Only Way Is Essex series 5 =

The Only Way Is Essex
- Series 5
- No. of episodes: 10 + Marbs special

Release
- Original network: ITV2
- Original release: 15 April – 27 May 2012

Series chronology
- ← Previous; Series 4 Next → Series 6

The fifth series of The Only Way Is Essex, a British semi-reality television programme, began airing on 15 April 2012 on ITV2. The series concluded on 27 May 2012 and consisted of ten episodes. A special, "The Only Way Is Marbs", aired on 13 June 2012 and is included on the Series 5 DVD. This is the first series to include new cast members Danni Park-Dempsey, Tom Pearce and Joan Collins, the latter of which is the mother of cast member Gemma Collins. It is the last series to include Georgina Dorsett, who made her debut during the previous series. The series mainly focused on the bitter fallout between Charlie and Gemma following their break-up and her spreading rumours about his sexuality, as well as the rekindled romance between Joey and Sam, and new relationships for Tom K and Lydia, Ricky and Jess, and Lauren P and Tom P. It also included a divide between the boys of Essex, and Lucy and Mario getting engaged.

== Cast ==
- Billi Mucklow
- Billie Faiers
- Bobby Cole Norris
- Cara Kilbey
- Carol Wright
- Charlie King
- Chloe Sims
- Chris "Little Chris" Drake
- Danni Park-Dempsey
- Debbie Douglas
- Frankie Essex
- Gemma Collins
- Georgina Dorsett
- James "Arg" Argent
- James "Diags" Bennewith
- Jess Wright
- Joan Collins
- Joey Essex
- Lauren Goodger
- Lauren Pope
- Lucy Mecklenburgh
- Lydia Bright
- Mario Falcone
- Mick Norcross
- Patricia "Nanny Pat" Brooker
- Ricky Rayment
- Sam Faiers
- Tom Kilbey
- Tom Pearce

== Episodes ==
No. overall	No. in series	Title	Original release date	Duration	UK viewers
51	1	"Episode 1"	15 April 2012	45 minutes	1,658,000
The Essex gang are in shock as Arg shows off his new skinny look in preparation for the London Marathon. Gemma is faced with more worries about Charlie when she realises there is no passion between the pair, but when he finally asks her to get naked, she’s unimpressed when he expresses his desire to draw her instead. Sam opens up about her recent kiss with Joey, whilst Lauren G struggles to accept her weight. Elsewhere at a charity auction, Lucy isn’t happy when Mario kids for a day with Cara, and Jess agrees to go on a date with Ricky.
52	2	"Episode 2"	18 April 2012	45 minutes	1,571,000
Gemma delivers some home truths to Charlie about their relationship as she becomes fed up at him not paying her enough attention, whilst Lydia fumes at Arg for telling people he could easily win her back. At Joey’s Reem Relaunch party, Tom P is torn between the two Laurens, and Frankie fears that her brother is being used when she sees Joey and Sam getting close again. Elsewhere Gemma is embarrassed by Charlie’s outrageous dancing, Ricky reveals he’s received flirty texts from a mystery female, and Little Chris makes a failed attempt at asking Frankie out.
53	3	"Episode 3"	22 April 2012	45 minutes	1,599,000
Ricky’s mystery texter is the talk of Essex, but how long until the news reaches Jess? With still no luck in the bedroom, Gemma fears the real reason is that he’s spending too much time with Bobby. The boys bet on how Arg will do in the London Marathon, whilst Tom K announces his relationship worries with Billi. Lauren G is deleted when Tom P asks her to join him on a night out, whilst Sam gives Ricky a shock ultimatum over the texts. Taking Sam’s advice into account, Ricky confronts the mystery woman and tells her to stop contacting him – where it’s revealed to be Gemma.
54	4	"Episode 4"	25 April 2012	45 minutes	1,686,000
Arg makes plans to ask Lydia out at the finish line of the London Marathon but soon changes his mind when he learns of her recent one night stand, whilst Cara and Billi glam up for the run. Gemma makes sure she gets to Charlie first before he finds out from somebody else about her texts with Ricky, but he quickly ends their relationship when the truth is revealed. Tom K confides in Tom P over his worries about Billi always putting Cara before him, and Lydia is distraught after receiving abusive text messages from Arg.
55	5	"Episode 5"	29 April 2012	45 minutes	1,600,000
Billi and Tom K are forced to face the music when they discuss where their relationship is going, and Cara is put in an awkward situation following the break-up. A divide is forming between the boys after Mario hears Diags has made personal comments about him, whilst Joey takes Sam on a tour of Essex in a helicopter on their date. Lucy defends Lydia and has it out with Arg – leaving Mario no choice but to step in when it turns sour. Meanwhile Charlie confronts Ricky over his texts to Gemma, and Mick’s life is turned upside down after a house fire.
56	6	"Episode 6"	13 May 2012	45 minutes	1,738,000
Jess hears that Billi and Cara has been talking about her and Carol behind her back leaving her raging. After a conversation with the boys about how many girls they’ve been with, Charlie then confides in Little Chris over his amount, whilst Tom P asks Lauren P out on a date to a vineyard. Mick celebrates his birthday with a Vegas themed party where Jess angrily confronts the girls over their bitching, and accidentally drops Gemma and Arg in it when she reveals that they are their sources. Joey and Sam grow even closer, and Ricky sits on Arg’s new designer sunglasses.
57	7	"Episode 7"	16 May 2012	45 minutes	1,430,000
After having another run-in with Charlie over her comments about him, Gemma introduces her new boyfriend Rami to the group and also reveals that Arg has been asking her to do sexual favours for him. Lauren P and Tom P have a successful date where she breaks her rule by kissing him on their first date. Cara and Billi angrily confront Arg for going to Jess and telling her what they said about her, whilst Sam hosts a dinner party for the couples of Essex where he makes peace with Ricky. Mario and Diags’ feud continues.
58	8	"Episode 8"	20 May 2012	45 minutes	1,456,000
Arg is left crushed when Diags tells him that Tom K has been recently texting Lydia, and Sam fumes to hear that Joey has taken another girl home with him after a night out. Feeling betrayed by his friend, Arg goes to meet Tom K to find out why he’s been texting Lydia, but he faces more shocks when Tom tells him that the boys have been encouraging it. Elsewhere Mick shows off his new man cave, and despite denying the rumours Joey breaks things off with Sam. Lydia welcomes her best friend Danni into the group, and Tom P surprises Lauren P with flowers.
59	9	"Episode 9"	23 May 2012	45 minutes	1,514,000
Diags makes another enemy when Lydia expresses her hatred for him for telling Arg about her and Tom K, whilst the girls have an inkling that Gemma may have the hots for Arg. Sam is torn over what to do about Joey when he pleads for her forgiveness, and Jess has some good news to share with the group. Fed up of the gay remarks towards him, Charlie confronts Gemma at Bobby’s shop opening causing an almighty row between the pair. Lauren G feels annoyed with Tom P for moving on so quickly with Lauren P.
60	10	"Episode 10"	27 May 2012	45 minutes	1,506,000
The rivalry between the boys escalates and Diags is determined to confront Mario. Lauren comes face-to-face with Tom P questioning him over his decision to choose Lauren P over her. Gemma apologises to Bobby for ruining his open night, Joey is back in Sam’s good books after he writes her a love letter, and Arg confesses to Debbie that he was unfaithful to Lydia. Gossip quickly spreads around Essex that Gemma and Arg have recently got together, and Mario and Diags face off. Gemma tells Arg that she is in love with him before the pair share a kiss.
61	11	"The Only Way Is Marbs"	13 June 2012	60 minutes	1,498,000
As the group jet off to Marbella, Lucy isn’t impressed with Mario’s stand-off attitude. Gemma tells the girls that Arg has told her she is too fat to be his girlfriend, and Tom K and Billi finally discuss his new romance with Lydia. Lauren G gives Arg some advice as he wallows in his own self-pity, meanwhile Ricky and Jess spend the night together. Mario whisks Lucy off on a boat where he plans a romantic proposal – to which she says yes, but when the pair announce it to the group, Sam discusses rumours that could jeopardise their happiness.

== Reception ==
=== Ratings ===
Episode	Date	Official ITV2 rating	ITV2 weekly rank	Official ITV2+1 rating	Total ITV2 viewers
Episode 1	15 April 2012	1,392,000	2	266,000	1,658,000
Episode 2	18 April 2012	1,382,000	3	189,000	1,571,000
Episode 3	22 April 2012	1,428,000	2	171,000	1,599,000
Episode 4	25 April 2012	1,441,000	2	245,000	1,686,000
Episode 5	29 April 2012	1,346,000	3	254,000	1,600,000
Episode 6	13 May 2012	1,513,000	2	225,000	1,738,000
Episode 7	16 May 2012	1,191,000	1	239,000	1,430,000
Episode 8	20 May 2012	1,176,000	2	280,000	1,456,000
Episode 9	23 May 2012	1,179,000	2	335,000	1,514,000
Episode 10	27 May 2012	1,211,000	1	295,000	1,506,000
Marbs	13 June 2012	1,303,000	1	195,000	1,498,000
Series average		1,326,000	2	250,000	1,576,000
