= The Only Way Is Essex series 4 =

The Only Way Is Essex
- Season 4
- No. of episodes: 10

Release
- Original network: ITV2
- Original release: 29 January – 29 February 2012

Series chronology
- ← Previous; Series 3 Next → Series 5

The fourth series of The Only Way Is Essex, a British semi-reality television programme, began airing on 29 January 2012 on ITV2. The series concluded on 29 February 2012 and consisted of ten episodes. This is the first series to include Bobby Cole Norris, Charlie King, Chris "Little Chris" Drake, Georgina Dorsett, James "Diags" Bennewith, Ricky Rayment and Tom Kilbey. It is the last series to include twins Dino and Georgio Georgiades, and Peri Sinclair who had appeared since the third series, and Nicola Goodger who first appeared during the second series. The series heavily focuses on new boy Ricky causing a stir in Essex by going behind the boy's backs and trying to get with many of the girls, as well as the strain between friendships when Billi finds love with Cara's brother Tom, and Jess finally cuts Lauren G out of her life. It also features the aftermath of Arg and Lydia's break-up, and Lucy and Mario hitting another rough patch in their turbulent relationship.

== Cast ==
- Billi Mucklow
- Billie Faiers
- Bobby Cole Norris
- Cara Kilbey
- Carol Wright
- Charlie King
- Chloe Sims
- Chris "Little Chris" Drake
- Debbie Douglas
- Dino Georgiades
- Frankie Essex
- Gemma Collins
- Georgina Dorsett
- Georgio Georgiades
- James "Arg" Argent
- James "Diags" Bennewith
- Jessica Wright
- Joey Essex
- Lauren Goodger
- Lauren Pope
- Lucy Mecklenburgh
- Lydia Bright
- Mario Falcone
- Mick Norcross
- Nicola Goodger
- Patricia "Nanny Pat" Brooker
- Peri Sinclair
- Ricky Rayment
- Sam Faiers
- Tom Kilbey

== Episodes ==
No. overall	No. in series	Title	Original release date	Duration	UK viewers
41	1	"Episode 1"	29 January 2012	45 minutes	1,502,000
New girl Georgina has heads turning as Joey instantly takes a liking to her, but she isn’t impressed when he gets his best friend Diags to talk to her for him instead. In the wake of Arg and Lydia’s split, Debbie gives Arg some much needed advice as he makes it his mission to win back her daughter. Mario makes it known that he has history with Georgina, whilst Billi and Cara attempt some doggy yoga. Arg interrupts Lydia’s birthday meal to make a bold statement to her, whilst Lauren P reels from the news that her PIP implants could explode.
42	2	"Episode 2"	1 February 2012	45 minutes	1,492,000
Debbie is in Lydia’s bad books for being a shoulder to cry on for Arg, and Carol gives her some friendly advice on how to patch things up with her daughter. Elsewhere Mario seeks solace from his father when he realises he hasn’t quite forgiven Lucy yet, and Sam and Billie clash over their business. Lucy receives a huge shock when she stumbles across messages from other girls on Mario’s iPad, and Cara is torn over whether to tell her that he has been messaging her as well. Joey hosts a poker night, and Gemma cleanses her third eye.
43	3	"Episode 3"	5 February 2012	45 minutes	1,506,000
Cara faces the difficult task of telling Lucy that Mario has been messaging her leaving her broken, and she feels his revenge plot has gone too far. Elsewhere Georgina also reveals that he has been messaging her, and accidentally puts her foot in it when Lucy overhears her confiding in Lauren P about it. Chloe reveals her brand new look but doesn’t get the reaction she was hoping for, and Gemma celebrates her 31st birthday in style. Joey makes another attempt at wooing Georgina, whilst Sam moves in with her new boyfriend.
44	4	"Episode 4"	8 February 2012	45 minutes	1,478,000
Georgina and Lauren P finally agree to go out with Joey and Diags leaving Chloe worried for her cousin being led astray, but the girls are far from impressed when the boys take them to an arcade. Meanwhile some of the Essex females visit a clairvoyant where Gemma is keen to know exact dates for her future wedding. Mario makes it his mission to win back Lucy, but has she forgiven him already? Lydia faces fresh heartbreak when more rumours surface that Arg cheated on her whilst they were together.
45	5	"Episode 5"	12 February 2012	45 minutes	1,328,000
Sam is put in an awkward position as she plans a swimwear house warming party but doesn’t want to cause tension by inviting both Lydia and Arg. Lauren G breaks down about her weight, whilst Mario asks Lucy out on a first date for Valentine’s Day. Some of the boys go to Mick’s caravan whilst Sam hosts her party. Arg is upset to see a shared photo of Lydia in her bikini next to another boy, and Georgina and Lucy attempt to clear the air. The girls have their heads turned by new hunk Ricky who reminisces with Lydia over their childhood memories.
46	6	"Episode 6"	15 February 2012	45 minutes	1,576,000
A depressed Arg buys Lydia some £1,000 shoes in a last bid attempt to sway her, whilst Lauren G and Cara both express their desire to woo Ricky. Mario and Lucy head out on their first date where they agree to wipe the slate clean and not use their past mistakes against each other. Billi is put in a difficult position when she finds herself getting close to Cara’s brother Tom, whilst Arg reveals to Joey that he has slept with Lydia again, but is now being ignored by her completely. Elsewhere the group celebrate Valentine’s Day with a Sex and the City party.
47	7	"Episode 7"	19 February 2012	45 minutes	1,447,000
Lauren G reels from recent events after her shop is destroyed by vandals. There is strain on Billi and Tom’s new romance already as Cara fails to support the pair, and Debbie delivers some harsh home truths to Arg. Ricky makes enemies as Joey feels he’s stepping on Arg’s toes, and Tom isn’t happy with him kissing his sister in front of him. Lydia and Arg break down after a heart-to-heart about their last five years together, and Billi is forced to make a choice after Tom and Cara’s sibling rivalry gets heated.
48	8	"Episode 8"	22 February 2012	45 minutes	1,488,000
With Arg still convinced Ricky is after Lydia, the boys are there to lift his spirits, unaware that it’s actually Cara who Ricky is dating. Bobby introduces himself to Lydia, whilst some of the Essex girls celebrate Pancake Day. Arg interrupts Ricky’s date with Cara to lecture him over what the boys have told him about him and Lydia, leaving Ricky infuriated and taking his anger out on Cara – causing Jess to step in to calm the situation down. Frankie tears up as she realises she’s still alone, whilst Lydia announces her desires for the next man in her life.
49	9	"Episode 9"	26 February 2012	45 minutes	1,593,000
Joey is far from impressed to hear that Ricky has been talking behind his back, whilst Gemma reveals to the group that she has a new man on the scene. Elsewhere Lauren P is delighted with her new boobs, and Gemma is sceptical on her date with Charlie as starts to wonder if he is actually gay. Jess and Lauren G fallout again over their past, but both are revealed to be texting Ricky. Lauren G hosts the opening night for her new shop where Ricky’s behaviour is the talk of Essex, and Joey confronts him over what he’s been saying about him, which leads to a fist-up between the pair.
50	10	"Episode 10"	29 February 2012	45 minutes	1,768,000
Ricky and Joey make up following their almighty row, whilst both Lauren G and Jess see no way bac for their friendship and refuse to speak to each other. Elsewhere Mario celebrates his birthday by hosting an “M” themed party where he asks Lucy to move in with him again, and Cara isn’t happy when Billi shows up as Mrs Kilbey. Jess and Lauren G come face-to-face and immediately clash as their past is dragged up, whilst Charlie puts an end to the gay rumours by making a grand entrance and swooping Gemma off her feet.

== Reception ==
=== Ratings ===
Episode	Date	Official ITV2 rating	ITV2 weekly rank	Official ITV2+1 rating	Total ITV2 viewers
Episode 1	29 January 2012	1,339,000	1	163,000	1,502,000
Episode 2	1 February 2012	1,295,000	1	197,000	1,492,000
Episode 3	5 February 2012	1,290,000	2	216,000	1,506,000
Episode 4	8 February 2012	1,277,000	2	201,000	1,478,000
Episode 5	12 February 2012	1,089,000	4	239,000	1,328,000
Episode 6	15 February 2012	1,353,000	3	223,000	1,576,000
Episode 7	19 February 2012	1,374,000	2	173,000	1,447,000
Episode 8	22 February 2012	1,272,000	3	216,000	1,488,000
Episode 9	26 February 2012	1,345,000	2	218,000	1,593,000
Episode 10	29 February 2012	1,526,000	2	242,000	1,768,000
Series average		1,316,000	2	209,000	1,518,000
