= The Only Way Is Essex series 19 =

The Only Way Is Essex
- Season 19
- No. of episodes: 10

Release
- Original network: ITVBe
- Original release: 9 October – 9 November 2016

Series chronology
- ← Previous; Series 18 Next → Series 20

The nineteenth series of the British reality television programme The Only Way Is Essex was confirmed on 3 June 2015 when it was announced that it had renewed for at least a further six series, taking it up to 21 series. It is the fourth series to be included in its current contract. The series premiered on 9 October 2016 with a The Only Way is Marbs special. It includes the first appearances of new cast members Ben Shenel and Ercan Ramadan. Mario Falcone and Frankie Essex also made a surprise one-off return to the series during the final episode of the series to celebrate Chloe Sims's 35th birthday. Love Island winners Nathan Massey and Cara De La Hoyde both made another guest appearance during the eighth episode. Original cast member James Argent was also absent for most of this series. A further two Essexmas specials aired in December 2016, where Danni Armstrong announced her departure from the series.

The series focused heavily on Bobby Cole Norris' mission to conquer his fears and the breakdown of Amber and Chris' relationship causing a divide between the boys and the girls,

== Cast ==
- Amber Dowding
- Ben Shenel
- Bobby Cole Norris
- Carol Wright
- Chloe Lewis
- Chloe Meadows
- Chloe Sims
- Chris Clark
- Courtney Green
- Dan Edgar
- Danni Armstrong
- Debbie Douglas
- Ercan Ramadan
- Frankie Essex
- Gemma Collins
- Georgia Kousoulou
- James "Arg" Argent
- James "Diags" Bennewith
- James "Lockie" Lock
- Jon Clark
- Kate Wright
- Lauren Goodger
- Liam Blackwell
- Lydia Bright
- Mario Falcone
- Megan McKenna
- Nikki Blackwell
- Pete Wicks
- Tommy Mallet
- Vas J Morgan

== Episodes ==
No. overall	No. in series	Title	Original release date	Duration	UK viewers
220	1	"The Only Way Is Marbs, Part 1"	9 October 2016	60 minutes	1,051,000
The gang arrive in Marbella with fresh tension between Arg and Lydia over an abusive email he sent to her, and Chloe S is enraged with Courtney’s comments about Danni and Lockie’s recent breakup. Chloe L firmly places herself in Chloe M and Courtney’s friendship group leaving Megan feeling she’s been replaced by her old rival, and Kate dreads coming face-to-face with both Dan and Jon. Meanwhile after a shock night together, Lydia tells Arg she needs to return home to think about her feelings, Megan celebrates her birthday in style, and Lockie tells Danni he has to let her go.
221	2	"The Only Way Is Marbs, Part 2"	12 October 2016	50 minutes	1,154,000
Debbie expresses her disappointment when Lydia returns to Essex with all the gossip from Marbella. Danni delivers some devastating news to Megan that Pete has been texting other girls, leaving her no choice but to erupt on her boyfriend. In need of a friend, Pete flies home to see Lockie, but back in Marbs, the breakup is on everybody’s mind. Georgia has it out with Chloe L after hearing her making a comment about Dan being back on the market, feeling she has no loyalty to her friends, whilst Pete is determined to fight to win Megan back.
222	3	"Episode 3"	16 October 2016	50 minutes	1,036,000*
Lydia is upset when Danni hangs her dirty laundry out to dry, but it’s Danni who is left more hurt when she faces backlash from an angry Debbie. Amber hosts a breast cancer charity night to raise money for the cause close to her heart, whilst Courtney, Ercan, Chloe L and Ben go on a successful double date at a vineyard. Megan struggles to forgive Pete for his wrongdoings and Lauren Goodger returns to give her advice in her time of need. Elsewhere Chloe L feels ganged up on by the other girls, and Arg aims to turn his life around.
223	4	"Episode 4"	19 October 2016	50 minutes	1,105,000
Pete still pesters Megan in a desperate attempt to win her round, and meets up with her parents to apologise to them for causing their daughter pain. Danni and Debbie have it out in the street as they both say sorry for making each other upset, whilst Tommy announces his desire to have an OBE. Elsewhere Bobby faces one of his biggest fears, Chris and Amber split following a disagreement, and Kate and Chloe L fail to make amends. Lydia calls an intervention and arranges a meeting between Chloe L and Georgia in order to get them on speaking terms again.
224	5	"Episode 5"	23 October 2016	50 minutes	1,049,000
Amber feels angered by Chris for not supporting her over his brother, and the girls think Jon is out of order for his treatment of Amber. Chloe L is still public enemy number one as she continues to protest her innocence, and Georgia attempts to aid her back into the friendship group. Meanwhile Chloe M accuses Amber of stirring the pot, and Kate’s heartfelt conversation with Dan ends in disaster. Megan’s family urge her to give Pete one more chance, and she’s faced with a huge dilemma when he pleads for her forgiveness.
225	6	"Episode 6"	26 October 2016	50 minutes	1,062,000
The girls arrange a night out to lift Kate’s spirits, whilst Dan confides in the boys about her getting the wrong end of the stick from their conversation. Megan is whisked off her feet as she spends some quality time with Pete, and the pair finally agree to start from scratch. Amber reaches out to Jon to make peace with him, whilst Gemma returns to Essex to find out the latest gossip. Elsewhere Diags unveils his 2017 plumbing calendar, Chloe L and Ben go on another date, and Lockie tells the boys that he doesn’t approve of Megan’s new rules for Pete.
226	7	"Episode 7"	30 October 2016	50 minutes	1,180,000
The gang head to Thorpe Park to celebrate Halloween where Chloe S and Liam compete to see who can scare each other the most, and Chris faces an awkward heart to heart with Amber. The girls finally put their feud to rest as Chloe L makes an emotional plea for forgiveness, whilst Megan confronts Lockie over his comments over her newly rekindled relationship with Pete. Elsewhere Tommy and Georgia celebrate their second anniversary, Dan struggles to see anyway back for him and Kate, and Bobby faces another of his fears.
227	8	"Episode 8"	2 November 2016	50 minutes	1,103,000
Megan turns to Lauren for support when she feels that everybody is viewing her relationship in a negative light, whilst Georgia plans an anniversary party for her and Tommy. Bobby and Lydia fail to conquer their fears of snakes, and Gemma tries her luck again with Jon. Chloe M’s rivalry with Georgia is reignited following another Twitter bust-up, Pete questions Lockie over his loyalties, and Chris struggles to keep it together following his break-up with Amber. Meanwhile Nathan Massey and Cara De La Hoyde arrive at Georgia and Tommy’s party.
228	9	"Episode 9"	6 November 2016	50 minutes	1,019,000
As Pete celebrates his birthday by the bonfire, he’s hit with emotion as Megan gives him a memory book. Ben feels rejected when Chloe L tells him she doesn’t want to put a label on them, but then takes a swipe at her ex on social media. Elsewhere Chris struggles to move on following a phone call from Amber, and the girls encourage Chloe L not to let Ben go. Megan and Pete’s happiness is short lived when she discovers an intimate photo shoot he’s done recently, Danni and Lockie finally agree to be civil with each other, and Nikki educates Bobby, Carol and Debbie on her religion.
229	10	"Episode 10"	9 November 2016	50 minutes	1,084,000
Chloe S gets a huge birthday surprise when Frankie and Mario return to Essex to celebrate it with her. The tension between Kate and Jon intensifies when they come face-to-face and clash over Amber and Chris’s recent break-up, and Ben and Chloe L clear the air following the rocky start to their relationship. Megan is torn between her head and her heart as she has an important decision to make regarding Pete, whilst Tommy delivers an inspirational speech to a local school. Pete is delighted when Megan agrees to start over once again.
230	11	"The Only Way is Essexmas, Part 1"	18 December 2016	60 minutes	967,000
Lockie plans a trip to Liverpool with the boys for his 30th birthday, but the girls decide to gate crash. Elsewhere Danni is faced with a huge dilemma as she contemplates telling Lockie about the new man in her life. Chloe M announces she has growing feelings for Jon, unaware that it’s Chloe L that has his attention. Gemma and Bobby clash over a disagreement of an old pact, Carol and Debbie reminisce over their memories with Nanny Pat, and Ben clashes with Chloe L again. Danni finally plucks up the courage to tell Lockie the truth – but things soon turn sour between the pair.
231	12	"The Only Way Is Essexmas, Part 2"	19 December 2016	60 minutes	714,000
Danni leaves Liverpool early following her confrontation with Lockie. Chloe L is put in an awkward situation when she’s forced to discuss the texts Jon has sent her with Chloe M, and Bobby reaches out to Gemma with an apology. Dan finally declares his love for Kate before the pair reconcile, but there’s less happiness for Chris and Amber when they awkwardly run into each other. Danni tells the girls she’s leaving Essex before being forced into another argument with Lockie. Elsewhere Chloe L rejects Jon’s offer for a date.

== Reception ==
=== Ratings ===
Episode	Date	Official ITVBe rating	ITVBe weekly rank	ITVBe+1 viewers	Total ITVBe viewers
Marbs 1	9 October 2016	1,021,000	1	31,000	1,051,000
Marbs 2	12 October 2016	1,128,000	1	26,000	1,154,000
Episode 3	16 October 2016	1,036,000	2		
Episode 4	19 October 2016	1,081,000	1	24,000	1,105,000
Episode 5	23 October 2016	1,020,000	2	29,000	1,049,000
Episode 6	26 October 2016	1,027,000	1	35,000	1,062,000
Episode 7	30 October 2016	1,115,000	2	65,000	1,180,000
Episode 8	2 November 2016	1,068,000	1	35,000	1,103,000
Episode 9	6 November 2016	972,000	2	47,000	1,019,000
Episode 10	9 November 2016	1,010,000	1	74,000	1,084,000
Essexmas 1	18 December 2016	937,000	1	30,000	967,000
Essexmas 2	19 December 2016	685,000	1	29,000	714,000
Series average		1,008,000	1	39,000	1,044,000
