= The Only Way Is Essex series 6 =

The Only Way Is Essex
- Season 6
- No. of episodes: 10

Release
- Original network: ITV2
- Original release: 22 July – 22 August 2012

Series chronology
- ← Previous; Series 5 Next → Series 7

The sixth series of The Only Way Is Essex, a British semi-reality television programme, began airing on 22 July 2012 on ITV2. The series concluded on 22 August 2012 after ten episodes. This is the first series to include new cast members Darrell Privett, who is the ex-boyfriend of Lauren Pope, and was the only series to feature Jamie Reed, who later returned for two cameo appearances during the eighth series. It also included the brief return of original cast member Mark Wright, who made an appearance without a speaking part. His dad, Mark Wright Snr also returned to the series having previously appeared briefly in the third series. This was the final series to feature Lauren Goodger until her return during The Only Way Is Essexmas special in 2015. The series focused heavily on the rivalry between Lucy and Sam when Sam investigates rumours that Mario has been cheating, it also includes a love triangle between Lauren G, Lauren P and Tom P, and a declaration of love as Bobby realises the extent of his feelings towards Charlie.

== Cast ==
- Billi Mucklow
- Billie Faiers
- Bobby Cole Norris
- Cara Kilbey
- Carol Wright
- Charlie King
- Chloe Sims
- Chris "Little Chris" Drake
- Danni Park-Dempsey
- Darrell Privett
- Debbie Douglas
- Frankie Essex
- Gemma Collins
- James "Arg" Argent
- James "Diags" Bennewith
- Jamie Reed
- Jess Wright
- Joan Collins
- Joey Essex
- Lauren Goodger
- Lauren Pope
- Lucy Mecklenburgh
- Lydia Bright
- Mario Falcone
- Mark Wright Snr
- Mick Norcross
- Patricia "Nanny Pat" Brooker
- Ricky Rayment
- Sam Faiers
- Tom Kilbey
- Tom Pearce

== Episodes ==
No. overall	No. in series	Title	Original release date	Duration	UK viewers
62	1	"Episode 1"	22 July 2012	45 minutes	1,484,000
Lucy and Mario go full steam ahead and plan their engagement party but leave Joey and Sam off the guest list because of their negativity towards their news. Gemma fumes with Lydia over her comments about her and Arg’s sex life, and Danni reveals that she fancies Tom P despite him not knowing where he stands with Lauren P. Little Chris is hurt when Mario admits he’s not sure who he wants to be his best man, Billi and Cara announce they want to be christened just to they can have a church wedding in the future, and Joey and Sam turn up at the engagement party prepared for a fallout.
63	2	"Episode 2"	25 July 2012	45 minutes	1,078,000
Joey and Sam’s relationship is rocked by rumours started by Mario as an act of revenge, whilst there’s trouble in paradise for Gemma and Arg when she gets tired of his constant putdowns. Charlie sets his sights on Lauren G but is left gutted when Tom P gets there first. Mick and Debbie host a sports day event where Lauren P and Chloe are exhausted watching from the side lines, and the tension between Lucy and Sam escalates. Little Chris confesses to the boys that he likes the look of Danni. Arg seeks much needed advice from Mark Wright Snr.
64	3	"Episode 3"	29 July 2012	45 minutes	1,115,000
Billie fears that Gemma may be pregnant after realising she is getting increasingly emotional by the day, but she admits that her confidence is being knocked by Arg. Joey celebrates his birthday in style with an 80’s themed party, and Arg is delighted to surprise him with a retro chopper until he makes a grand entrance on an even better one. There’s tension between the two Lauren’s when home truths are spilled, Tom P confides in Mark Snr over his blossoming romance with Lauren G, and Arg accuses Lydia of being two faced when he catches her being friendly with Gemma.
65	4	"Episode 4"	1 August 2012	45 minutes	1,258,000
Tom K is annoyed with Lydia for getting involved in the relationship drama between Gemma and Arg, Tom P takes Lauren G to the cinema for their first date, and Carol worries that Jess’s past trust issues with men could jeopardise her romance with Ricky. Arg receives a lecture from Mick for upsetting the girls so takes it upon himself to make a grand gesture to earn forgiveness from Gemma. Lucy isn’t happy with the negativity spread about their relationship, and Jess and Ricky face a tough conversation as they realise they aren’t as happy as they seem.
66	5	"Episode 5"	5 August 2012	45 minutes	1,515,000
Lucy and Sam finally clear the air but refuse to believe the rumours brought up by one another, and Mario isn’t happy with Jess for planting further seeds in Lucy’s head. Bobby is jealous when he feels that Charlie has ditched him to spend time with the boys, and Jess and Lauren G’s feud is dragged up once again when Tom P reveals he’s been receiving flirty text messages from Jess. Gemma tells Arg that her pregnancy test has come back negative, and Bobby opens up to Lydia about his recent struggles and confesses that he’s fallen in love with Charlie.
67	6	"Episode 6"	8 August 2012	45 minutes	1,304,000
Lauren G causes atmosphere between the girls when she tells them about the secret texts between Jess and Tom P, whilst Diags goes to a clinic to get tested for STDs. Jamie Reed, the ex of Frankie, Billie and Lydia, makes his presence known on Charlie’s birthday night out – causing Arg and Gemma to clash as the past is brought up. Jess confronts Tom P for blowing things out of proportion, and Ricky is angry to hear when he hears from somebody else what Jess has been up to. Elsewhere Bobby makes a declaration of love to Charlie.
68	7	"Episode 7"	12 August 2012	45 minutes	958,000
Jess is convinced that Tom P is on a mission to split her a Ricky up, but stops the gossiping by revealing the pair are still solid. Jamie is the talk of Essex when it transpires that he’s claimed he’s slept with a number of the girls in a bid to ruin things for them in their current relationships. Elsewhere Charlie reaches out to Bobby, but instead he pushes him away and seeks support from Gemma, whilst Ricky is left red faced when he hears about further messages sent between Tom P and Jess. Lydia arouses suspicion by questioning the girls who has slept with Jamie.
69	8	"Episode 8"	15 August 2012	45 minutes	1,298,000
Arg finally calls a truce between him and Tom K but drops a spanner in the works by telling him what Cara has said about the relationship with Lydia. Gemma is adamant that Charlie has given Bobby mixed signals, whilst Jamie continues to ruffle feathers leaving Joey no choice but to confront him over what he’s said about Frankie. Lucy rages with Sam for bringing up more rumours, Lauren G is banned from attending Jess’s singing party, and Gemma betrays Bobby following another clash with Charlie. Elsewhere Ricky and Jess reunite.
70	9	"Episode 9"	19 August 2012	45 minutes	1,564,000
Some of the group visit Southend to celebrate Bobby’s birthday, whilst Lauren G weighs up the pros and cons of being with Tom P. Bobby is gutted when he sees no way back for his friendship with Charlie, and Mario offers some friendly advice to Jamie for making amends with the girls. Arg encourages Lauren G to settle her differences with Jess. Sam and Lucy finally call a truce, and whilst trying to break off their brief romance, things get heated between Tom P and Lauren G. Elsewhere Charlie and Danni get flirty, and Gemma and Arg attend a singing lesson.
71	10	"Episode 10"	22 August 2012	45 minutes	1,092,000
Gemma receives a lecture from her mother for her behaviour towards Bobby and Charlie. Lauren G finally draws the line under her rivalry with Jess and Carol, whilst Jamie’s attempt to clear the air with Frankie turns sour as drinks are spilled and fruit punch bowls are thrown. At Lucy’s prom themed party, Arg is gutted to announce Tom K and Lydia have been voted prom king and queen, Mario asks Little Chris to be his best man, and Lauren G has a heart-to-heart with Arg before revealing she’s taking a break from Essex.

== Reception ==
=== Ratings ===
Episode	Date	Official ITV2 rating	ITV2 weekly rank	Official ITV2+1 rating	Total ITV2 viewers
Episode 1	22 July 2012	1,236,000	1	248,000	1,484,000
Episode 2	25 July 2012	849,000	4	229,000	1,078,000
Episode 3	29 July 2012	933,000	2	182,000	1,115,000
Episode 4	1 August 2012	1,080,000	3	178,000	1,258,000
Episode 5	5 August 2012	1,257,000	2	258,000	1,515,000
Episode 6	8 August 2012	1,159,000	1	145,000	1,304,000
Episode 7	12 August 2012	793,000	3	165,000	958,000
Episode 8	15 August 2012	1,038,000	2	260,000	1,298,000
Episode 9	19 August 2012	1,342,000	1	222,000	1,564,000
Episode 10	22 August 2012	878,000	3	214,000	1,092,000
Series average		1,057,000	2	210,000	1,267,000
