= The Only Way Is Essex series 3 =

The Only Way Is Essex
- Season 3
- No. of episodes: 14 + Christmas Special

Release
- Original network: ITV2
- Original release: 25 September – 9 November 2011

Series chronology
- ← Previous; Series 2 Next → Series 4

The third series of The Only Way Is Essex, a British semi-reality television programme, began airing on 25 September 2011 on ITV2. The series concluded on 9 November 2011 and consisted of fourteen episodes. An Essexmas special aired on 20 December 2011 and is included on the Series 3 DVD. This is the first series to include Billi Mucklow, Cara Kilbey, Mario Falcone, Peri Sinclair, twins Dino and Georgio Georgiades and briefly included Mark Wright Snr, the father of Mark and Jess Wright, before he later returned in the sixth series. It is the last series to include Harry Derbidge, Kirk Norcross, Maria Fowler and Mark Wright having all appeared since the first series. The series heavily focused on the romance of Mark and Sam despite obstacles like their respective exes Lauren G and Joey, the beginning of Lucy and Mario, and Arg and Lydia facing rocky patches in their relationship.

== Cast ==
- Billi Mucklow
- Billie Faiers
- Cara Kilbey
- Carol Wright
- Chloe Sims
- Debbie Douglas
- Dino Georgiades
- Frankie Essex
- Gemma Collins
- Georgio Georgiades
- Harry Derbridge
- James "Arg" Argent
- Jess Wright
- Joey Essex
- Kirk Norcross
- Lauren Goodger
- Lauren Pope
- Lucy Mecklenburgh
- Lydia Bright
- Maria Fowler
- Mario Falcone
- Mark Wright
- Mick Norcross
- Nicola Goodger
- Patricia "Nanny Pat" Brooker
- Peri Sinclair
- Sam Faiers

== Episodes ==
No. overall	No. in series	Title	Original release date	Duration	UK viewers
26	1	"Episode 1"	25 September 2011	45 minutes	2,102,000
Determined to put the bachelor rumours to rest following his split with Lauren G, Mark bets Arg he can be celibate for 14 nights. Lucy introduces her new boyfriend Mario and he forbids her from going to Jess’s birthday party in case she bumps into Mark. Elsewhere Joey and Sam confront each other over their break-up, and Kirk feels awkward following his split with Lauren P. Arg and Gemma make a pact to get fit, whilst new boys Dino and Georgio settle into the group by turning to the females. Mark is devastated when he feels Arg isn’t fully supporting him.
27	2	"Episode 2"	28 September 2011	45 minutes	1,474,000
Mark faces his first temptation when he goes to yoga and realises it’s full of girls, almost breaking his promises celibacy, whilst Debbie takes Joey and Lydia to a car boot sale. Gemma plans a singles night for all those looking for love leading to awkwardness as Jess and Kirk are matched together as well as Maria and Mick. A lonely Mark interrupts Arg and Lydia’s romantic meal together, and Nicola lashes out at Lucy as she demands that she apologises to Lauren G for the trouble she’s caused her in the past with Mark.
28	3	"Episode 3"	2 October 2011	45 minutes	1,631,000
Kirk feels betrayed when Mick expresses his desire to ask Maria out on a date following the singles night, whilst Frankie is crushed when Joey reveals he wants to move out. Mario admits to Lucy that he’d feel uncomfortable with her speaking to Mark’s family leaving her unsure what to say to Jess when she invites her to model her lingerie. Maria agrees to go on a date with Mick before trying to patch things up with Kirk. Elsewhere Mark and Mario come face-to-face, and Arg tries a career as a radio presenter but it doesn’t go to plan.
29	4	"Episode 4"	5 October 2011	45 minutes	1,646,000
Joey and Sam meet up to discuss their break-up and agree to be civil with each other, but it ends with both of them getting emotional. Tired of her putting his best friend down all the time, Arg asks Lydia to make more of an effort with Mark. Mario and Kirk’s gossip about Mark gets back to him leaving him no choice but to confront his love rival. Elsewhere despite setting the pair up thinking they wouldn’t get on, Gemma is infuriated with Maria as she goes on a date with Mick. Lucy finally apologises to Lauren G for her past mistakes.
30	5	"Episode 5"	9 October 2011	45 minutes	1,869,000
Sam plans a girls night in where Gemma promises there will be no drama between her and Maria, but she can’t help but to confront her over her feelings for Mick. Lydia and Lucy go on a double date with Arg and Mario where Mario reveals he’s bought a new apartment and would like Lucy to move in with him. Arg angers Lydia by leaving the date to spend time with Mark, and Mario agrees to take both girls out for a good night. Things take a twist when Lydia, Mario and Lucy interrupt Mark and Arg speaking to other girls in a club where Mark defends himself and tells Mario that he recently slept with his girlfriend. Sam and the girls happily gossip about the boys, whilst Mario calls it time with Lucy, and Lydia can’t forgive Arg.
31	6	"Episode 6"	12 October 2011	45 minutes	1,576,000
Lucy desperately tries to salvage her relationship with Mario and protests her innocence against Mark’s rumours. Gemma confides in Frankie about her weight issues and her desire to be thin, whilst Dino and Georgio plan a Greek night in order to cheer her up. Jess has her brother’s back as she reveals Lucy asked her to lie for her over where she stayed recently, and Lydia meets with Mark to discuss the strain he adds on her relationship. Sam meets Mario’s ex Peri and is shocked by her opinions of his new romance.
32	7	"Episode 7"	16 October 2011	45 minutes	1,686,000
Kirk meets Billi at a petrol station and immediately takes a liking to her, asking her to come to his karaoke night at the Sugarhut and to bring a friend along. Lydia rages with Arg once again, this time after he accuses her of bullying Mark. Elsewhere Mick confides in Kirk about feeling lonely, and the girls think Maria is with Mick because of lust rather than love. Billi and Cara agree to go on a double date fishing with Joey and Kirk, whilst Chloe consults a plastic surgeon about her bum implants. At the karaoke party, Mark texts a guest asking to meet him outside – but who is it?
33	8	"Episode 8"	19 October 2011	45 minutes	1,676,000
Sam is revealed as Mark’s mystery texter as she agrees to go on a double date with him, Arg and Lydia when Lydia also decides to make an effort with him for the sake of Arg. Mick draws the line under his brief romance with Maria when rumours surface that she used to be an escort, whilst Joey plans an animal themed pool party. Mario and Lucy rage when they discover what Peri has said about their relationship, and Lauren P is jealous to see Kirk flirting with Billi. Lauren G announces that she has recently gone back to Mark before having a heart-to-heart with Joey about their exes.
34	9	"Episode 9"	23 October 2011	45 minutes	1,749,000
Harry shocks his friends by revealing he has met somebody, whilst Lydia hosts a vintage theme day for the opening of her shop. Mario plans an Italian family night for Lucy to give her the chance to meet his family, and Carol urges Mark to get closer to Sam much to the annoyance of Lauren G. Joey and Kirk take Cara and Billi out again but as the night draws in Kirk reveals he’s not as attracted to Billi as Joey is with Cara. Debbie throws some digs at Arg at Mario’s Italian night, and Lucy is welcomes into her new family.
35	10	"Episode 10"	26 October 2011	45 minutes	1,680,000
Carol bumps into Lauren G where she reveals she’s cooking a meal for the family and Sam is coming along, leaving Lauren G distraught that somebody has taken her place. Lucy clashes with Peri when they discuss Mario, and Gemma plays nurse to an ill Dino. Sam and Mark’s relationship is the talk of Essex, whilst Gemma urges Arg to join her at bootcamp to shift some weight, and his self-conscience is knocked during a conversation with Lydia. Sam and Billie are in turmoil after they’re attacked on a night out.
36	11	"Episode 11"	30 October 2011	45 minutes	1,739,000
Billi feels mugged off to hear that Kirk has been stringing her along so angrily confronts him at his home, and Lucy goes through Mario’s phone to discover he’s missing going out with the boys. Elsewhere Mark and Jess join Arg and Gemma at bootcamp where Arg is caught attempting to smuggle in pizza, and during a tense game of truth or dare Gemma opens up to Arg about her feelings, and Jess puts an end to the rumours by showing evidence that Lucy has slept with Mark. Harry invites his new boyfriend round for a meal, and Lauren G meets Mario for the first time.
37	12	"Episode 12"	2 November 2011	45 minutes	1,910,000
It’s the morning after the night before at bootcamp and Gemma has regrets about her drunk confession to Arg, whilst Lydia is horrified when the news gets back to her. Lucy and Mario clash due to the lack of trust in their relationship and he takes back his offer of moving in together. Gemma is startled when she takes Harry out for a driving lesson. At Sam’s Halloween party Joey finally confronts Mark over his new blossoming romance with Sam, and Lauren G’s heart sinks when she witnesses Mark and Sam kissing.
38	13	"Episode 13"	6 November 2011	45 minutes	1,853,000
Chloe plans a wedding themed birthday party with herself being the bride and Joey playing the groom. Following another argument with Lucy, Mario is determined to get to the bottom of the cheating rumours and asks to meet up with Jess to see the proof. A desperate Lucy makes sure she gets to Mario first and makes a big confession signalling the end of the relationship. Despite Lauren G claiming she’s over Mark, her jealous side emerges as she unleashes her temper on both him and Sam, and Gemma faces up to Lydia over her feelings for Arg.
39	14	"Episode 14"	9 November 2011	60 minutes	2,210,000
Full of regret, Lucy vows to win Mario back but he’s in two minds whether to forgive her so seeks advice from Carol and Debbie. Sam confides in Billie over her trust issues with Mark and constantly having to look over her shoulder for Lauren G. Arg visits Joey for some fashion advice before Lydia tells him he shouldn’t change his look for her. Elsewhere Mark prepares to leave Essex but has one last goodbye for Lauren G, and gives Sam the opportunity to leave with him – but she declines. As Mark bids farewell, Lucy has a shock public speech for Mario, whilst Jess and Joey share a kiss.
40	15	"The Only Way Is Essexmas"	20 December 2011	60 minutes	1,893,000
Some of the group take a trip to Lapland to visit Father Christmas but there’s tension when Mario is invited without Lucy. Sam isn’t happy after witnessing Joey and Jess’s kiss as the realisation that he’s finally moved on sinks in. Lucy fears Mario hasn’t quite forgiven her after being hit with some comments about her cheating, whilst Debbie arranges a stripper surprise for the girls. Frankie gets emotional at the thought of visiting her Mum’s grave. Arg hosts a tudor themed party for his birthday where Joey and Jess face an awkward reunion, and Lydia is over the moon by her gift from Arg.

== Ratings ==
Episode	Date	Official ITV2 rating	ITV2 weekly rank	Official ITV2+1 rating	Total ITV2 viewers
Episode 1	25 September 2011	1,885,000	1	217,000	2,102,000
Episode 2	28 September 2011	1,309,000	3	165,000	1,474,000
Episode 3	2 October 2011	1,468,000	2	163,000	1,631,000
Episode 4	5 October 2011	1,437,000	3	209,000	1,646,000
Episode 5	9 October 2011	1,685,000	2	184,000	1,869,000
Episode 6	12 October 2011	1,369,000	3	207,000	1,576,000
Episode 7	16 October 2011	1,566,000	2	120,000	1,686,000
Episode 8	19 October 2011	1,453,000	3	223,000	1,676,000
Episode 9	23 October 2011	1,554,000	2	195,000	1,749,000
Episode 10	26 October 2011	1,533,000	3	147,000	1,680,000
Episode 11	30 October 2011	1,577,000	2	162,000	1,739,000
Episode 12	2 November 2011	1,706,000	2	194,000	1,910,000
Episode 13	6 November 2011	1,572,000	3	276,000	1,853,000
Episode 14	9 November 2011	1,926,000	2	284,000	2,210,000
Essexmas	20 December 2011	1,615,000	2	278,000	1,893,000
Series average		1,574,000	3	196,000	1,772,000
