= Jordan Brook =

English television personality (born 1995)

- Born: Jordan Mark Brook; 3 March 1995 (age 31); Barking and Dagenham, London, England
- Occupation: Television personality
- Television: The Only Way Is Essex; The Voice UK

Jordan Mark Brook (born 3 March 1995) is an English television personality, known for appearing as cast member on the ITV reality series The Only Way Is Essex in 2017, and again since 2022. He was also a contestant on The Voice UK in 2022.

== Life and career ==
Jordan Mark Brook was born on 3 March 1995 in the London Borough of Barking and Dagenham. In 2017, he joined the cast of the ITVBe reality series The Only Way Is Essex. He appeared in the twentieth and twenty-first series before initially departing after being axed from the show. In 2022, Brook auditioned for the eleventh series of the ITV singing competition The Voice UK. At his audition, he performed the song "Amazed" by the band Lonestar, but failed to get a turn from the coaches. That same year, Brook returned to The Only Way Is Essex for its twenty-ninth series and has appeared continuously since. During his time on the show, he dated co-star Chloe Brockett. Since 2022, he has been in a relationship with former Geordie Shore cast member Sophie Kasaei, who subsequently began starring alongside him on The Only Way Is Essex. In December 2025, the couple announced that they were expecting their first child. In March 2026, Brook was admitted to hospital with a swelling on the brain.

== Filmography ==
As himself
| Year | Title | Notes | Ref. |
|---|---|---|---|
| 2017, 2022–present | The Only Way Is Essex | Main role | |
| 2022 | The Voice UK | Contestant; series 11 | |
