= Demi Sims =

English television personality (born 1996)

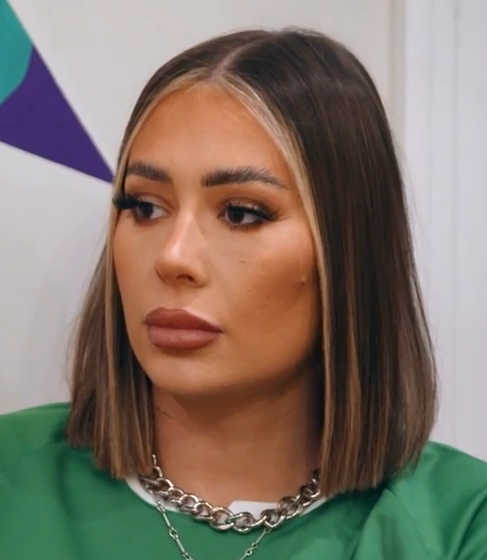
- Sims in House of Sims season 2, episode 1: "A House Divided"
- Born: 6 September 1996 (age 30)
- Occupation: Television personality
- Notable work: The Only Way Is Essex; Celebs Go Dating; Celeb Ex in the City; House of Sims
- Relatives: Chloe Sims (half-sister); Joey Essex (cousin)

Demi Sims (born 6 September 1996) is an English television personality. She appeared on The Only Way Is Essex in 2014, between November 2018 and July 2022, and in late 2024. She has also appeared on Celeb Ex in the City, Celebs Go Dating, CelebAbility, and House of Sims. In December 2020, Sims was described by Emma Garland of Vice as one of the "very few openly bisexual women in mainstream reality TV".

== Early life ==
Demi Sims was born on 6 September 1996. She came out as bisexual in her late teens and has vitiligo. Her father and uncle have trained the boxers Conor Benn and Anthony Joshua. Sims, her sister Frankie Sims, their brother Charlie Sims, their half-sister Chloe Sims, and their cousin Joey Essex have all appeared on The Only Way Is Essex; (Note: Joey from 2011 to 2013, Chloe from 2011 to 2022, Charlie from 2013 to 2015, and Frankie from 2019 to 2022.) Demi appeared on the programme in 2014 and from November 2018.

== Career ==
In 2019, she appeared on that year's series of Celebs Go Dating. She later dated that series' Megan Barton-Hanson and made a December 2020 appearance on her podcast You Come First. That month, the pair were described by Emma Garland of Vice as two of the "very few openly bisexual women in mainstream reality TV" alongside Chloe Ferry and the cast of The Bi Life. The pair later appeared on Eating With My Ex. Sims also made solo appearances on CelebAbility and Celeb Ex in the City and dated Leonie McSorley of Ex on the Beach and Francesca Farago of Too Hot to Handle. Shortly after breaking up with the latter, Sims was involved in a love triangle on The Only Way Is Essex and then did not date for about three years.

Sims left The Only Way Is Essex in July 2022, by which time she was being managed by Georgia Shults, Charlie's girlfriend. Later that month, Demi, Chloe, Frankie, Charlie, and Shults were signed for House of Sims, a Keeping Up with the Kardashians-style documentary series aired on OFTV. By the end of that year, Demi had launched an OnlyFans account in preparation for the series. The first episode of House of Sims aired in May 2023, with subsequent episodes airing weekly. Demi and Frankie moved to Los Angeles to film the series but moved back to Essex after filming following an argument with Chloe and Charlie, which featured on the second series of House of Sims, broadcast in March 2024. In April 2024, Ben Pulsford of Closer wrote that the second series "somehow went from a wholesome postcard from LA to Big Brother's Fight Night" and Netflix aired the first series. Chloe stated in March 2025 that House of Sims had been cancelled.

Demi and Frankie presented a podcast together, Sims Squared, between March and July 2024, and reappeared on The Only Way Is Essex in late 2024 for a one-off appearance supporting Harry Derbidge, who had split up with Joe Blackman. Demi subsequently dated Eve Gale from Love Island and Jazz Saunders from Made in Chelsea. Fans of reality television worked out her romance with Saunders before either announced it after Saunders announced she was dating her first woman and both uploaded footage to social media filmed on same balcony. The pair split in December 2025.

Sims announced in February 2025 that she would be participating on the undercard of KSI vs Dillon Danis, though this event was later postponed. She eventually made her debut at Misfits 22 – Ring of Thrones in August, where she beat Nadeshi Hopkins.

== Personal life ==
Sims began began dating Love Island Australia's Gabby McCarthy in April 2026.
