= Saffron Lempriere =

English television personality

- Born: 3 June 1992 (age 33); Barking and Dagenham, London, England
- Occupation: Television personality
- Years active: 2018–present
- Television: The Only Way Is Essex

Saffron Lempriere (born 3 June 1992) is an English television personality. After making a guest appearance in an episode of Gemma Collins: Diva España, she joined the cast of the ITV reality series The Only Way Is Essex in 2018.

== Life and career ==
Lempriere was born on 3 June 1992 in the London Borough of Barking and Dagenham. She later relocated to Hornchurch, and in 2021, appeared as a celebrity guest at a Christmas light switch-on in Romford.

Lempriere made her television in an episode of Gemma Collins: Diva in 2018. She appeared in a guest role in the series, since she was a friend of lead cast member Gemma Collins. Later that year, she was cast in the ITVBe series The Only Way Is Essex, which Collins also starred in. She debuted in the twenty-third series. In 2019, she ran the London Marathon to raise funds for Children with Cancer UK.

In 2020, Lempriere experienced a miscarriage. She did not talk about it publicly until 2023, during Baby Loss Awareness Week, encouraging people to seek support if they had a similar experience. In 2021, Lempriere launched a company selling upcycled furniture. In 2025, she stated that she would like to appear on Celebs Go Dating so that she could receive professional dating advice.

== Filmography ==
As herself
Year	Title	Notes	Ref.
2018	Gemma Collins: Diva España	Cameo	
2018–present	The Only Way Is Essex	Main cast	
