= Mario Falcone =

English television personality

- Born: Mario Lorenzo Falcone; Essex, England
- Occupations: Television personality; tailor
- Years active: 2011–present
- Television: The Only Way Is Essex; Celebrity Big Brother
- Spouse: Becky Meisner (m. 2022)
- Partner: Lucy Mecklenburgh (2010–2012)
- Children: 2
- Relatives: Giovanna Fletcher (sister); Tom Fletcher (brother-in-law)

Mario Lorenzo Falcone is an English television personality and tailor. He is known for his appearances in the reality programme The Only Way Is Essex.

== Career ==
Falcone made his debut appearance on The Only Way Is Essex during the third series in 2011 and stayed until the sixteenth series, before returning for the nineteenth series and departing again after the twenty-first series. He was suspended for promoting slimming pills on social media.

On 22 August 2013, Falcone entered the Celebrity Big Brother house, competing in the twelfth series. He was the third TOWIE cast member to appear on the show, following Amy Childs in 2011 and Kirk Norcross in 2012. On 13 September, he finished fifth and left the house with fellow housemate and sixth place Vicky Entwistle.

== Personal life ==
Brought up in Shenfield, Essex, Falcone is English of Italian descent. He has two sisters: Giorgina and author Giovanna Fletcher, who is married to McFly's Tom Fletcher. Falcone was previously engaged to Lucy Mecklenburgh; they split in 2012.

== Filmography ==
Year	Title	Role	Notes
2011–2018, 2020	The Only Way Is Essex	Himself	Cast member
2012	Loose Women	Himself	Guest, 1 episode
2013	Celebrity Big Brother	Himself	Series 12 housemate
2013, 2014	Celebrity Big Brother's Bit on the Side	Himself	Series 12 housemate, Series 13 guest
