= Amber Turner (TV personality) =

English television personality (born 1993)

- Born: Amber Louise Turner; 29 June 1993 (age 32); Barking and Dagenham, England
- Occupation: Television personality
- Television: The Only Way Is Essex; Celebrity SAS: Who Dares Wins

Amber Louise Turner (born 20 July 1993) is an English television personality, known for appearing as cast member on the ITV reality series The Only Way Is Essex since 2017. She also appeared on Celebrity SAS: Who Dares Wins in 2019.

== Life and career ==
Amber Louise Turner was born on 20 July 1993 in Barking and Dagenham. In 2017, she joined the cast of the ITV reality series The Only Way Is Essex, and has appeared as a cast member since the show's twentieth series. She was in a six-year relationship with her co-star Dan Edgar until their split in 2023. In 2023, Turner appeared on an episode of CelebAbility, as well as taking part in the fifth series of Celebrity SAS: Who Dares Wins. She voluntarily withdrew from the course in the sixth episode.

== Filmography ==
As herself
Year	Title	Notes	Ref.
2017–present	The Only Way Is Essex	Series regular	
2022	Eating with My Ex	Guest; 1 episode	
2023	CelebAbility	Guest; 1 episode	
2023	Celebrity SAS: Who Dares Wins	Contestant; series 5	
