= Lauren Pope =

English television personality (born 1982)

- Born: Lauren Grace Pope; 29 September 1982 (age 44); Torquay, England
- Occupations: Television personality; DJ; model
- Years active: 2001–present
- Television: The Only Way Is Essex (2010–2015, 2017–2019)
- Children: 2

Lauren Grace Pope (born 29 September 1982) is an English model, television personality and DJ. In 2010, she began appearing in the ITVBe reality series The Only Way Is Essex and left in March 2019.

== Career ==
In 2004, Pope appeared in the second series of Mile High for two episodes. In 2007, Pope began a career as a DJ. Nuts magazine named her the "world's sexiest DJ". She then also became involved in producing. Pope also appears in the music video for the song "Ready for the Weekend" by Calvin Harris.

In 2007, Pope designed and launched her own brand of clip-in hair extensions, Hair Rehab London, appearing on the ITV reality series Tycoon. The show saw Peter Jones search for entrepreneurs with ideas that he helped turn into profitable companies, while the eventual winner was chosen by the public. Although she placed fourth out of six contestants, she continued working with Jones, which helped expand her business. In 2018, she released another range of hair extensions with her brand, Hair Rehab London.

In October 2010, she began appearing in the ITVBe reality series The Only Way Is Essex. She left the series in October 2015 to pursue business endeavours, but announced her return 18 months later. She returned to the series in 2017, but announced her departure again in 2019.

== Personal life ==
Pope is in a relationship with businessman Tony Keterman. In March 2020, Pope announced that she was pregnant with her first child. She announced that she had given birth on 11 July 2020 to a daughter named Raine Anais Keterman. In February 2022, Pope announced that she was pregnant with her second child. She announced that she had given birth on 15 June 2022, to a daughter named Leni Star Keterman.

== Filmography ==
Year	Title	Role	Notes
2004	Mile High	Jodie Wilkes	2 episodes
2007	Tycoon	Herself	5 episodes
2007	The Weakest Link	Herself	"Wags and Glamour" special
2007	Rise of the Footsoldier	Beautiful Girl	Film
2010–2015, 2017–2019	The Only Way Is Essex	Herself	Series regular, 201 episodes
