= Dan Edgar =

English television personality (born 1990)

- Born: Daniel Michael Edgar; 12 May 1990 (age 36); Thurrock, Essex, England
- Occupation: Television personality
- Television: The Only Way Is Essex; Dancing on Ice

Daniel Michael Edgar (born 12 May 1990) is an English television personality, known for appearing as cast member on the ITVBe reality series The Only Way Is Essex since 2015. He also appeared as a contestant on the seventeenth series of Dancing on Ice in 2025.

== Life and career ==
Edgar was born on 12 May 1990 in Thurrock, Essex. Prior to appearing on television, he worked as an electrician.

In 2015, Edgar joined the ITVBe reality series The Only Way Is Essex, and has appeared as a cast member since the show's fourteenth series. During his time on the show, he has been involved in relationships with several cast members including Kate Wright, Lauren Pope, Jess Wright, Amber Turner, Clelia Theodorou, Chloe Sims and Ella-Rae Wise, all of which have been documented on-screen. Edgar appeared in a promotional photo shoot for The Real Housewives of Cheshire. In 2025, Edgar is set to appear as a contestant on the seventeenth series of Dancing on Ice. Edgar is currently in a relationship with his ex-TOWIE co-star, Chloe Lewis.

== Filmography ==
As himself
Year	Title	Role	Ref.
2015–present	The Only Way Is Essex	Series regular	
2025	Dancing on Ice	Contestant; series 17	
