= Chloe Meadows =

English TV personality (born 1991)

- Born: 2 October 1991 (age 35); Barking and Dagenham, England
- Occupation: Television personality
- Television: The Only Way Is Essex; Celebrity Ghost Hunt

Chloe Jane Meadows (born 2 October 1991) is an English television personality, known for appearing as cast member on the ITV reality series The Only Way Is Essex since 2016.

== Life and career ==
Chloe Jane Meadows was born on 2 October 1991 in London Borough of Barking and Dagenham. She suffers from ulcerative colitis. In 2016, she joined the cast of the ITV reality series The Only Way Is Essex. She has appeared as a cast member since the show's seventeenth series. She is close friends with her co-star Courtney Green. In 2018, Meadows appeared on Celebrity Ghost Hunt alongside her co-stars. Following the thirty-fifth series of The Only Way Is Essex, Meadows announced she would be taking a break from the show.

== Filmography ==
As herself
Year	Title	Notes	Ref.
2016–present	The Only Way Is Essex	Main role	
2018	Celebrity Ghost Hunt	Guest; 1 episode	
