= Courtney Green =

English TV personality (born 1995)

- Born: Courtney Megan Green; 29 June 1995 (age 31); Waltham Forest, London, England
- Occupation: Television personality
- Television: The Only Way Is Essex; Celebrity Ghost Hunt; Celebs on the Ranch

Courtney Megan Green (born 29 June 1995) is an English television personality, known for appearing as a cast member on the ITV reality series The Only Way Is Essex since 2016. She also appeared on Celebs on the Ranch in 2019.

== Life and career ==
Green was born on 29 June 1995 in Waltham Forest, London. In 2016, she joined the cast of the ITV reality series The Only Way Is Essex. She has appeared as a cast member since the show's seventeenth series. In 2018, Green appeared on Celebrity Ghost Hunt. She was in relationship with Callum Bushby for seven years, prior to their split in 2025. In 2019, Green appeared as a contestant on Celebs on the Ranch. During her time on the show, Green was awarded two "horse shoes" as well as a "golden horse shoe", granting her immunity until the show's final. She ultimately finished as joint runner-up alongside Jenny Powell and Siva Kaneswaran.

== Filmography ==
As herself
Year	Title	Notes	Ref.
2016–2026	The Only Way Is Essex	Main role	
2018	Celebrity Ghost Hunt	Guest; 1 episode	
2019	Celebs on the Ranch	Contestant	
