= Ferne McCann =

English television personality (born 1990)

- Born: Ferne Alice McCann; 6 August 1990 (age 36); Brentwood, Essex, England
- Occupation: Television personality
- Years active: 2013–present
- Television: The Only Way Is Essex; I'm a Celebrity...Get Me Out of Here! This Morning; Ferne McCann: First Time Mum
- Children: 2

Ferne Alice McCann (born 6 August 1990) is an English television personality. She was a cast member of the ITVBe reality series The Only Way Is Essex, joining in the ninth series and leaving in the eighteenth. In 2015, she participated in the fifteenth series of I'm a Celebrity...Get Me Out of Here! and finished in third place.

In early 2016, she became a regular showbiz reporter on This Morning. Between 2017 and 2023, McCann starred in the ITVBe reality series Ferne McCann: First Time Mum. The series was rebranded to Ferne McCann: My Family & Me in September 2023 following the birth of her second child earlier that year. In 2024, McCann announced that her reality series would be coming to an end, before being announced as a contestant on the seventeenth series of Dancing on Ice in 2025.

== Career ==
In 2001, aged 10, McCann auditioned for S Club Juniors, but did not make the band. In 2007, McCann auditioned to play Lavender Brown in the Harry Potter film series, but lost out to Jessie Cave.

McCann was the winner of Miss Essex 2012 and in the Top 15 in Miss England in 2012.

In 2013, McCann became a regular cast member on the ITV2 (now ITVBe) reality show The Only Way Is Essex making her debut in the ninth series in June 2013. She quit the show in 2016 and made her last appearance in the seventeenth series. On 15 November 2015, it was confirmed that McCann would be participating in the fifteenth series of I'm a Celebrity...Get Me Out of Here!. She arrived as a late arrival alongside Vicky Pattison and Spencer Matthews. She finished in third place on 6 December. During the final, McCann had to eat a live water spider as part of a bushtucker trial, which generated nearly 1,500 complaints to Ofcom. These were later cleared in January 2016.

In March 2016, it was announced that McCann would star as Myrtle Wilson in the Union Theatre's production of The Great Gatsby. From May 2016, McCann began making regular appearances on the Channel 5 chat-show Up Late with Rylan hosted by Rylan Clark-Neal. In February 2017, she began appearing in Celebs Go Dating on E4 alongside her TOWIE co-star Joey Essex and I'm a Celebrity campmate Jorgie Porter. As of 2017, McCann stars in the ITVBe documentary series Ferne McCann: First Time Mum, a series about her experiences as a single mother with her child. In 2022, McCann was one of four finalists who completed series 4 of Celebrity SAS: Who Dares Wins. In 2023, McCann's reality series rebranded as Ferne McCann: My Family & Me, following the birth of her second child. In September 2024, McCann announced that her reality series would be ending following her decision to leave Later that month, she was announced to be competing as a contestant on the seventeenth series of Dancing on Ice in 2025. She was paired with Brendyn Hatfield and the pair were the second couple to be eliminated.

== Personal life ==
McCann was in a relationship with The Only Way Is Essex co-star Charlie Sims for six years. She was linked with George Shelley on I'm a Celebrity...Get Me Out of Here! and praised him a few months later when he came out as bisexual in February 2016 claiming 'it was his way of taking control'. She also holds a PCV licence after completing training in an effort to encourage more female bus drivers.

In January 2019, it was reported that McCann had been questioned by police after an altercation took place at the 24th National Television Awards between Love Island star Adam Collard and his partner Zara McDermott. Collard later stated that he planned to release the CCTV of the incident to show that McCann was at fault.

McCann began a relationship and soon announced her engagement to businessman Lorri Haines in 2022. She gave birth to a daughter in July 2023. McCann and Haines co-founded the mental well being app shoorah and, according to the charity website NACoA, have married.

=== Relationship with Arthur Collins ===
McCann was dating former businessman and scaffolder Arthur Collins when in April 2017 he was arrested and charged in connection with a nightclub acid attack in London. In November 2017, she gave birth to their first child, a daughter. On 13 November 2017, Collins was found guilty of five counts of grievous bodily harm and nine of actual bodily harm at Wood Green Crown Court. On 19 December 2017, Collins was jailed for twenty years, with another five years on licence. He later admitted to smuggling a mobile phone into prison so that he could speak to her. In January 2018, it was reported that McCann had liked a photo on Instagram which called for Collins' release.

In November 2022, voice notes featuring a woman's voice were leaked anonymously, allegedly revealing McCann making derogatory comments about Arthur Collins's acid attack victims. McCann published a public apology on Instagram, apologising to "all the victims of Arthur Collins's abhorrent actions in 2017" and adding that the voice messages were "manipulated, edited and taken entirely out of context."

== Filmography ==
As herself
Year	Title	Role	Notes
2013–2016	The Only Way Is Essex	Herself	Series 9-Series 17
2015	I'm a Celebrity...Get Me Out of Here!	Contestant	Series 15
2015	Loose Women	Guest panellist	
2016–2018	This Morning	Showbiz reporter	
2016	Up Late with Rylan	Regular role	
2016	Ferne and Vicky on the Road	Herself	
2017	Celebs Go Dating	Participant	Series 2
2017–2023	Ferne McCann: First Time Mum	Herself	
2021	Celebrity Best Home Cook	Contestant	
2022	Celebrity SAS: Who Dares Wins	Contestant	Series 4
2023-2024	Ferne McCann: My Family & Me	Herself	
2025	Dancing on Ice	Herself	Contestant; series 17
