= Quickenden =

Quickenden is a surname. Notable people with the surname include:

- Bob Quickenden (1923–2010), New Zealand footballer
- Jake Quickenden (born 1988), English singer, footballer, and reality television personality
