= George Shelley (singer) =

English singer and presenter

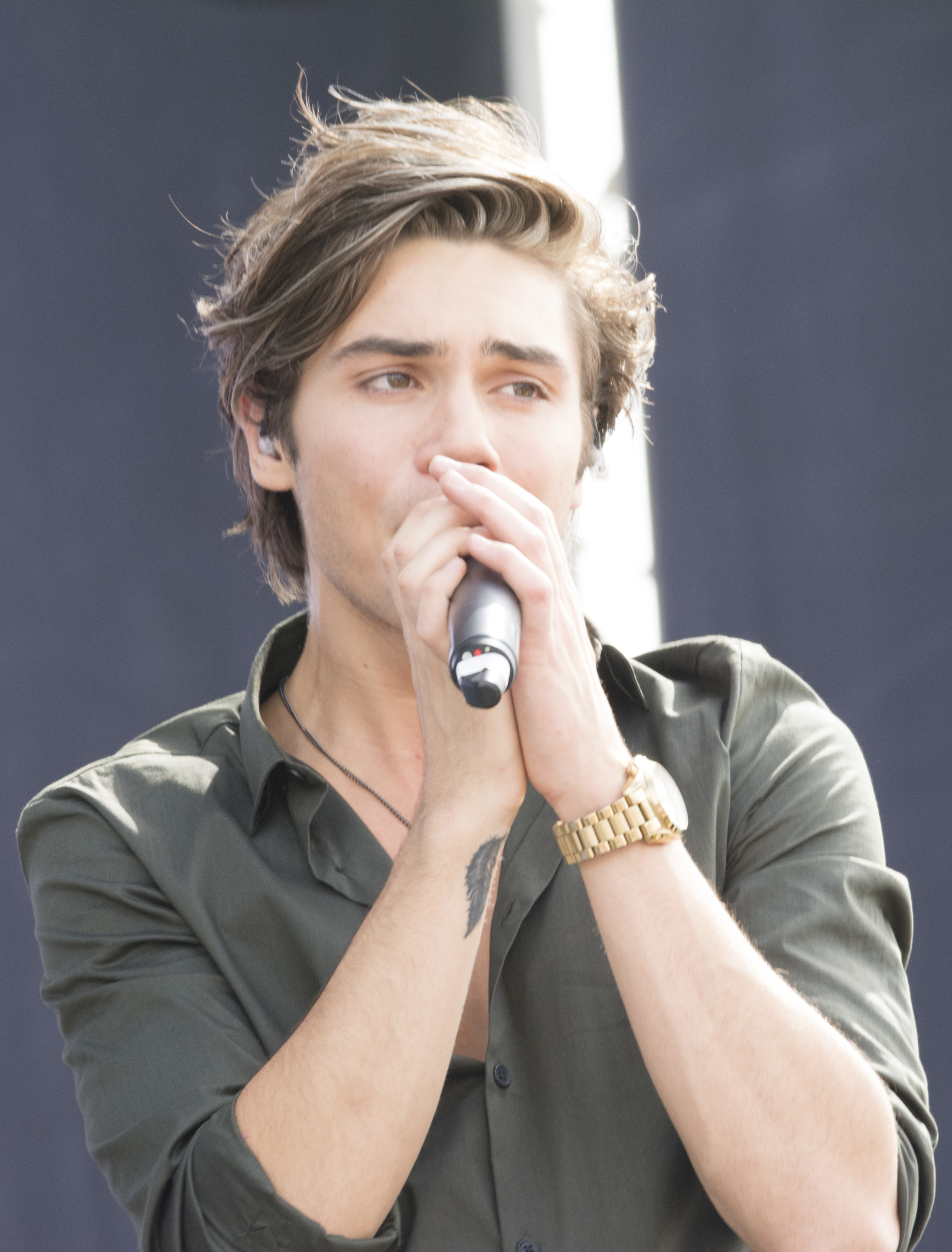
- Shelley performing in 2015
- Born: George Paul Shelley; 27 July 1993 (age 33); Clevedon, Avon, (Note: (now in North Somerset, England)) England
- Education: St Andrew's C of E Junior School The King Alfreds School
- Occupations: Singer; actor; presenter
- Years active: 2012–present
- Musical career
- Genres: Pop; pop rock
- Labels: Sony; Epic; RCA; Fearless

George Paul Shelley (born 27 July 1993) is an English singer, actor and presenter, and former member of the boy band Union J.

In 2015, he competed in the fifteenth series of the ITV reality show I'm a Celebrity...Get Me Out of Here! and finished as a runner-up to Vicky Pattison. He co-presented The Capital Breakfast Show alongside Dave Berry and Lilah Parsons.

== Early life ==
Shelley was born to Toni Harris of part Scottish descent in Clevedon, North Somerset (then in Avon). He attended Kings of Wessex Academy in Cheddar before graduating from Weston College in 2011. Shelley has two brothers, two step-sisters Anabelle and Louisa, four half-brothers. He had a younger sister, Harriet, who died after being hit by a car in 2017. Shelley attended Weston College in Weston-super-Mare from 2010 until 2011, where he completed a BTEC Extended Diploma in Graphic Design.

== Career ==
=== Union J ===
In 2012, Shelley was part of British band Only the Young, but left the band to audition for the ninth series of The X Factor as a solo artist singing "Toxic" and was eliminated during the bootcamp stage, as were boy band Triple J. However, due to Rough Copy having to withdraw from the show, an extra spot was opened up in Louis Walsh's category for judges' houses. Triple J's manager, Blair Dreelan, was contacted by The X Factor producers with an offer for the group to return, on the basis that Shelley was added to the three-piece. All parties accepted the offer and the band – now a four-piece – became Union J and advanced to judges' houses alongside fellow recalled group Times Red. Union J went on to progress to the live shows and finished fourth, behind Christopher Maloney, Jahméne Douglas and eventual winner James Arthur.

On 3 March 2016, Shelley left the band so he could focus on his acting and broadcasting career. On 31 January 2022 it was announced Union J would be reforming with Shelley rejoining the band.

=== Television and radio ===
Shelley signed to MN2S agency in 2015, but left for Coalition Talent where he is represented by agent Vinesh Patel for his live work and Ashley Vallance at Cole Kitchenn for management. In 2016, George joined the radio station The Capital Breakfast Show as a regular presenter alongside broadcaster Lilah Parsons and Dave Berry. In early 2016, George hosted the Brits Red Carpet live show alongside Lilah Parsons, and E!'s Golden Globes coverage alongside Sarah-Jane Crawford.

In April 2017, Shelley left The Capital Breakfast Show.

In July 2016, Shelley made his acting debut by guest-starring in an episode of the British sitcom series Murder in Successville in series 2, episode 4 as Sidekick. In 2017, Shelley made his second acting appearance in Benidorm. He played Giles in series 9, episode 4.

On 5 November 2022 Shelly appeared in 'Queens for the Night', a TV show presented by Lorraine Kelly, where celebrities transformed into drag queens for a night and performed on stage in front of a live audience. Shelly's Drag mentor was 'La Voix'. Shelly's drag name was 'Dame Shelly Sassy' and they sung a medley of tunes. Fellow 'Union J' member Jaymi Hensley was in the audience in drag too.

=== After Union J and Originals ===
In 2016, Shelley announced that he would be releasing his debut EP, with a series of music videos to accompany it. The lead single from the EP, titled "360", was released on 20 November 2016. Shelley has also modelled and released a calendar in 2017. In December 2017, Shelley returned to the fourteenth series of The X Factor, where he co-presented alongside Stacey Solomon. He interviewed the friends and families of the finalists at the live finals from the ExCeL London on things such as how they feel about their finalist who is competing in the competition and to send good luck messages to finalists.

In 2019, Shelley released a cover of "Put Your Records On". On 17 December 2021, Shelley released his single "Lose to Find". produced by Ofer Shabi and Yaniv Fridel at Soho Sonic Studios.

== Personal life ==
On 3 February 2016, in response to rumours regarding his sexuality, Shelley uploaded a video to YouTube, in which he stated that he is attracted to both men and women. However, he also stated that he does not want to be labelled as bisexual: "I've had girlfriends that I've loved and they've been amazing periods of my life. But I've also had boyfriends. And I just want you to know that whether I decide to be with a girl next or a guy next, it's because I love them and it shouldn't be a big deal."

In July 2018, upon the release of his debut single "Technicolour", the singer came out as gay. In an interview for Celebmix.com, he said: "I was scared for a long time, terrified of coming out. But when I did everyone was just like 'yeah'."

In February 2022, it was announced he was dating medical student and Out of the Blue singer Rory Naylor.

== Discography ==
=== Extended plays ===
- Originals (2016)

=== Singles ===
| Title | Year | Album |
|---|---|---|
| "360" | 2016 | Originals |
| "Soldier" | 2016 | Originals |
| "Scars" | 2016 | Originals |
| "Make it Better" | 2016 | Originals |
| "Poltergeist" | 2016 | Originals |
| "Prove Me Wrong" | 2016 | Originals |
| "Technicolour" | 2018 | Non-album singles |
| "Put Your Records On" | 2019 | Non-album singles |
| "Lose to Find" | 2021 | Non-album singles |

== Filmography ==
| Year | Show | Role | Notes |
|---|---|---|---|
| 2012 | The X Factor | Contestant | Series 9 |
| 2013–2018 | Loose Women | Panellist | 5 episodes |
| 2015 | I'm a Celebrity...Get Me Out of Here! | Contestant | Series 15 |
| 2016 | The Celebrity Chase | Contestant | 1 episode |
| 2016 | Murder in Successville | Sidekick | 1 episode |
| 2017 | Benidorm | Giles | Series 9, episode 4 |
| 2017 | The X Factor | Co-host | Series 14 |
| 2018 | George Shelley: Learning to Grieve | Subject | |
| 2019 | Celebrity Painting Challenge | Himself | |
| 2022 | Queens for the Night | Participant | |
