= Nadia Forde =

Irish model and TV personality

- Born: Nadia Forde; 3 May 1989 (age 37); Dublin, Ireland
- Occupations: Model, singer, TV personality
- Known for: Nadia Goes to Hollywood (2014); I'm a Celebrity... Get Me Out of Here! (2014)
- Spouse: Dominic Day (m. 2019)
- Modelling information
- Hair colour: Brown
- Eye colour: Hazel
- Website: nadiaforde.com

Nadia Forde (born 3 May 1989) is an Irish model, singer and TV personality of Italian descent. She participated in the fourteenth series of the hit British ITV show I'm a Celebrity...Get Me Out of Here!, starting on 16 November 2014 and ending on 2 December, finishing in ninth place. and has appeared in her own show Nadia Goes to Hollywood.

== Early life ==
Forde was born in Dublin 3 May 1989; her mother was Berenice Paolozzi and she has one, younger, brother. Her parents separated when she was 7, with one re-marrying and the other unable to bring up the two children. She lived for a year with aunts in Clontarf and Leopardstown in Dublin, and was subsequently brought up in Clontarf by her grandmother, Bernadette Paulozzi. She attended Holy Faith Secondary School, Clontarf. Her mother died from lymphoma in June 2015.

== Career ==
In 2013, Forde appeared on Ireland's The Late Late Show and presented Irish morning television. She has also appeared on nationwide radio stations, made theatrical appearances at Dublin's Tivoli Theatre, been a regular guest on RTE's The Republic of Telly and a contestant on TV3's Celebrity Salon in 2012.

During 2014, Forde starred in her own TV3 show Nadia Goes to Hollywood, documenting her time recording her first single and capturing her first acting role in the United States.

In August 2014, Forde made an appearance on the Oliver Callan spoof sketch show,Callan's Kicks. In November 2014, it was announced that she would be taking part in the fourteenth series of the ITV hit show I'm a Celebrity...Get Me Out of Here!. On 2 December she became the second celebrity to be evicted from the jungle.

In April 2015, a pilot for a reality show "Chasing The Dream" was broadcast in Ireland on 3e.

In 2021 Forde played the daughter of a recovering pain relief addict in a short, The Wall.

In 2023 Forde was cast in a Finnish political drama, Conflict.

== TV appearances ==
| Year | Title | Type | Role | Notes |
|---|---|---|---|---|
| 2013 | The Late Late Show | TV | Herself | 1 Episode, guest |
| 2014 | Nadia Goes to Hollywood | TV | Herself | TV documentary series |
| 2014 | I'm a Celebrity...Get Me Out of Here! | TV | Herself | Contestant/Participant |
| 2017 | Once Upon a Time in London | Film | Rita | |
| 2024–2025 | Conflict | TV | Claire Belfort | Miniseries; 3 episodes |
