= Judge Geordie =

British reality television series

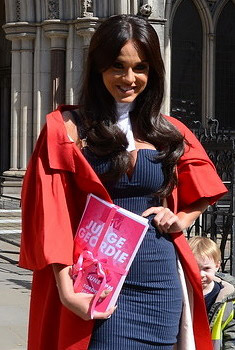
- Genre: Reality
- Created by: MTV
- Starring: Vicky Pattison
- Country of origin: United Kingdom
- Original language: English
- No. of series: 1
- No. of episodes: 10

Production
- Running time: 42 minutes (excluding adverts)
- Production company: Lime Pictures

Original release
- Network: MTV
- Release: 3 June – 5 August 2015

Judge Geordie is a British reality television series broadcast on MTV. The series was first announced in March 2015 and premiered on 3 June 2015. It features Vicky Pattison, a former cast member of Geordie Shore, settling feuds between friends, couples and family members.

== Ratings ==
Episode	Date	Official MTV rating	MTV weekly rank
Episode 1	3 June 2015	224,000	2
Episode 2	10 June 2015	222,000	2
Episode 3	17 June 2015	241,000	2
Episode 4	24 June 2015	59,000	3
Episode 5	1 July 2015	164,000	2
Episode 6	8 July 2015	131,000	2
Episode 7	15 July 2015	131,000	3
Episode 8	22 July 2015	128,000	3
Episode 9	29 July 2015	149,000	3
Episode 10	5 August 2015	125,000	3
