= I'm a Celebrity...Get Me Out of Here! (British TV series) series 14 =

I'm a Celebrity...Get Me Out of Here!
- Series 14
- Presented by: Anthony McPartlin; Declan Donnelly
- No. of days: 23
- No. of castaways: 12
- Winner: Carl "Foggy" Fogarty
- Runner-up: Jake Quickenden
- Companion show: I'm a Celebrity...Get Me Out of Here! NOW!
- No. of episodes: 20

Release
- Original network: ITV
- Original release: 16 November – 7 December 2014

Series chronology
- ← Previous; Series 13 Next → Series 15

I'm a Celebrity...Get Me Out of Here! returned for its fourteenth series on 16 November 2014 on ITV and ended on 7 December 2014.

The show was confirmed to be returning to ITV at the end of the previous series. On 22 October 2014, the trailer was revealed for the new series, which was broadcast on air across the ITV network in the run up to the series' premiere.

Ant & Dec both returned as presenters of the show, whilst Joe Swash, Laura Whitmore and Rob Beckett returned to present the ITV2 spin-off show, I'm a Celebrity...Get Me Out of Here! NOW!.

The series was won by Superbike champion Carl "Foggy" Fogarty, with Jake Quickenden and Melanie Sykes finishing in second and third places respectively.

Craig Charles, Gemma Collins and Jimmy Bullard would return to the series twelve years later to participate in the second series of I'm a Celebrity... South Africa, alongside other returning campmates to try become the second I'm a Celebrity legend. Collins would be eliminated alongside series 12 contestant David Haye, finishing in 10th place. Bullard would finish in 8th place after quitting in the middle of a survival trial. Charles would make the final but finish in fourth place.

== Celebrities ==
The celebrity cast line-up for the fourteenth series was confirmed on 11 November 2014.

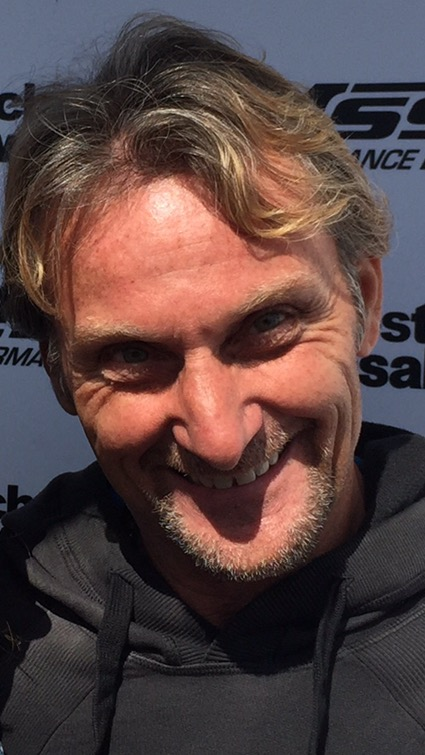
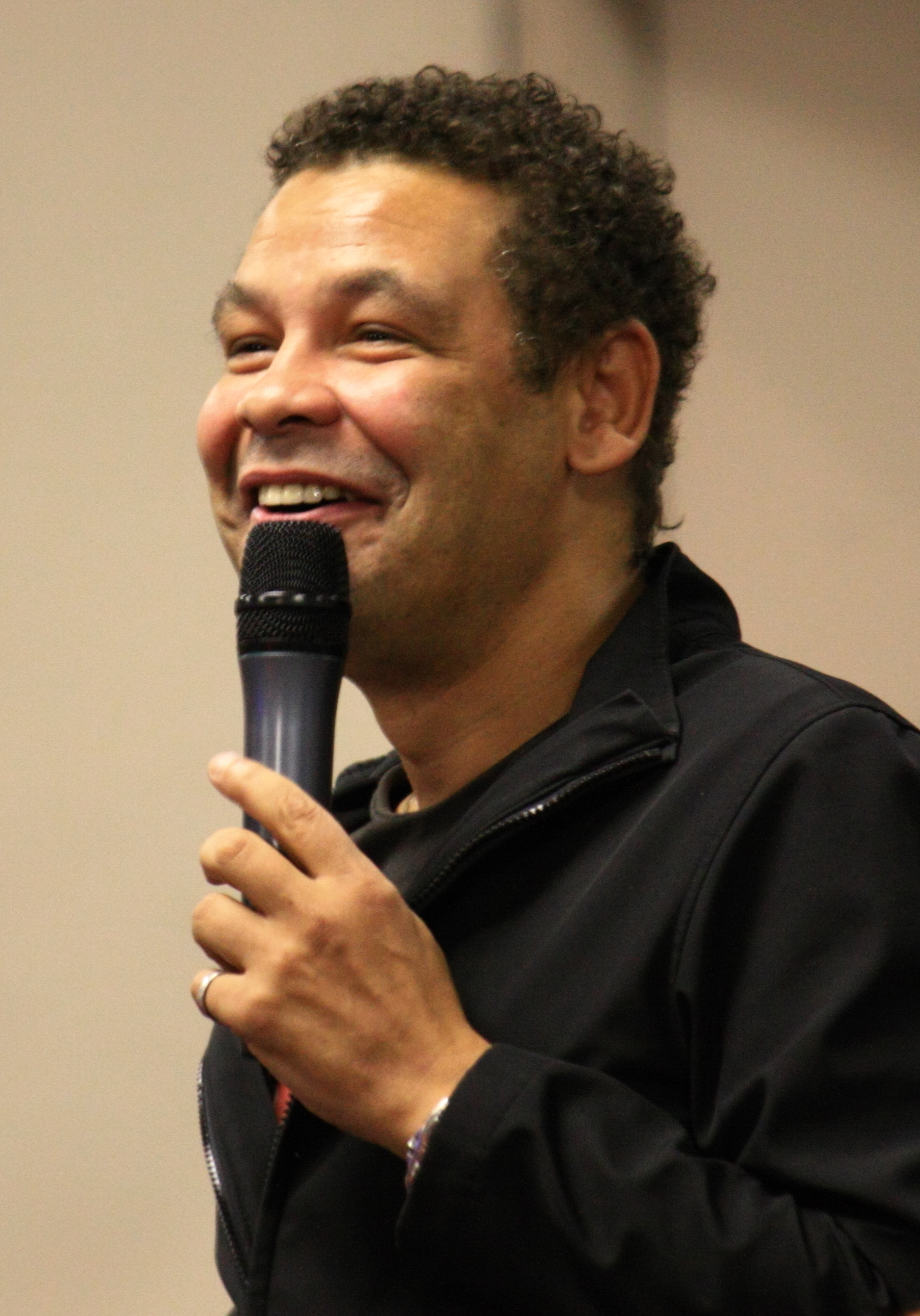
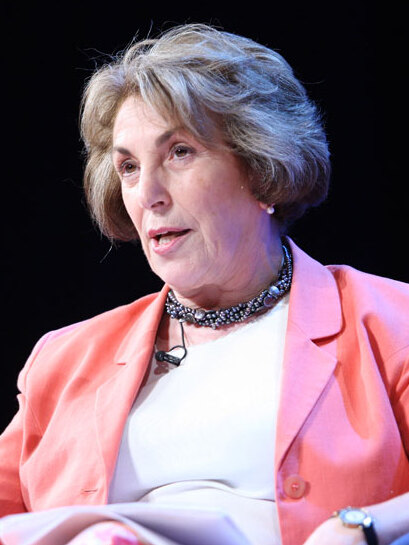
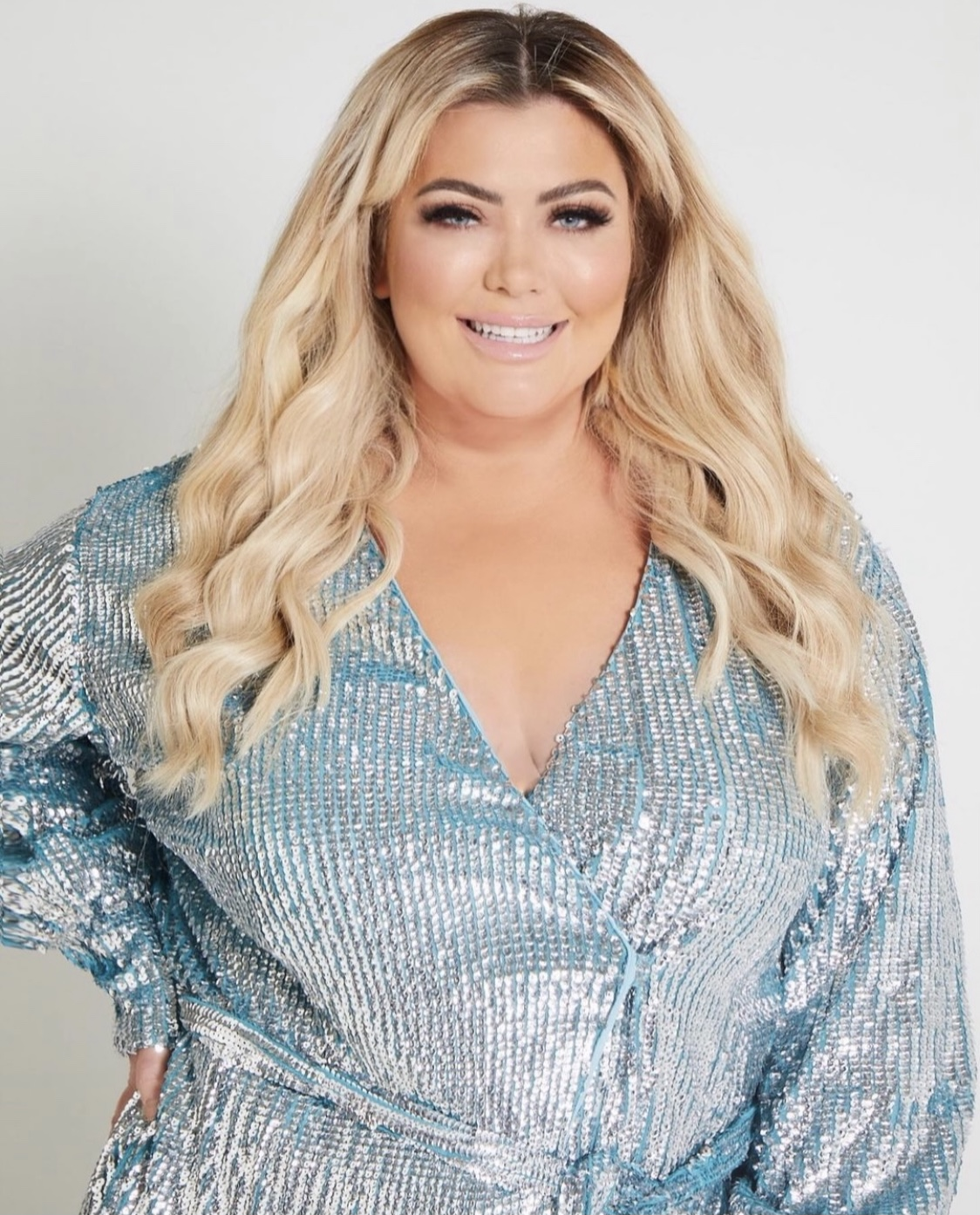
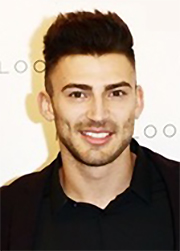
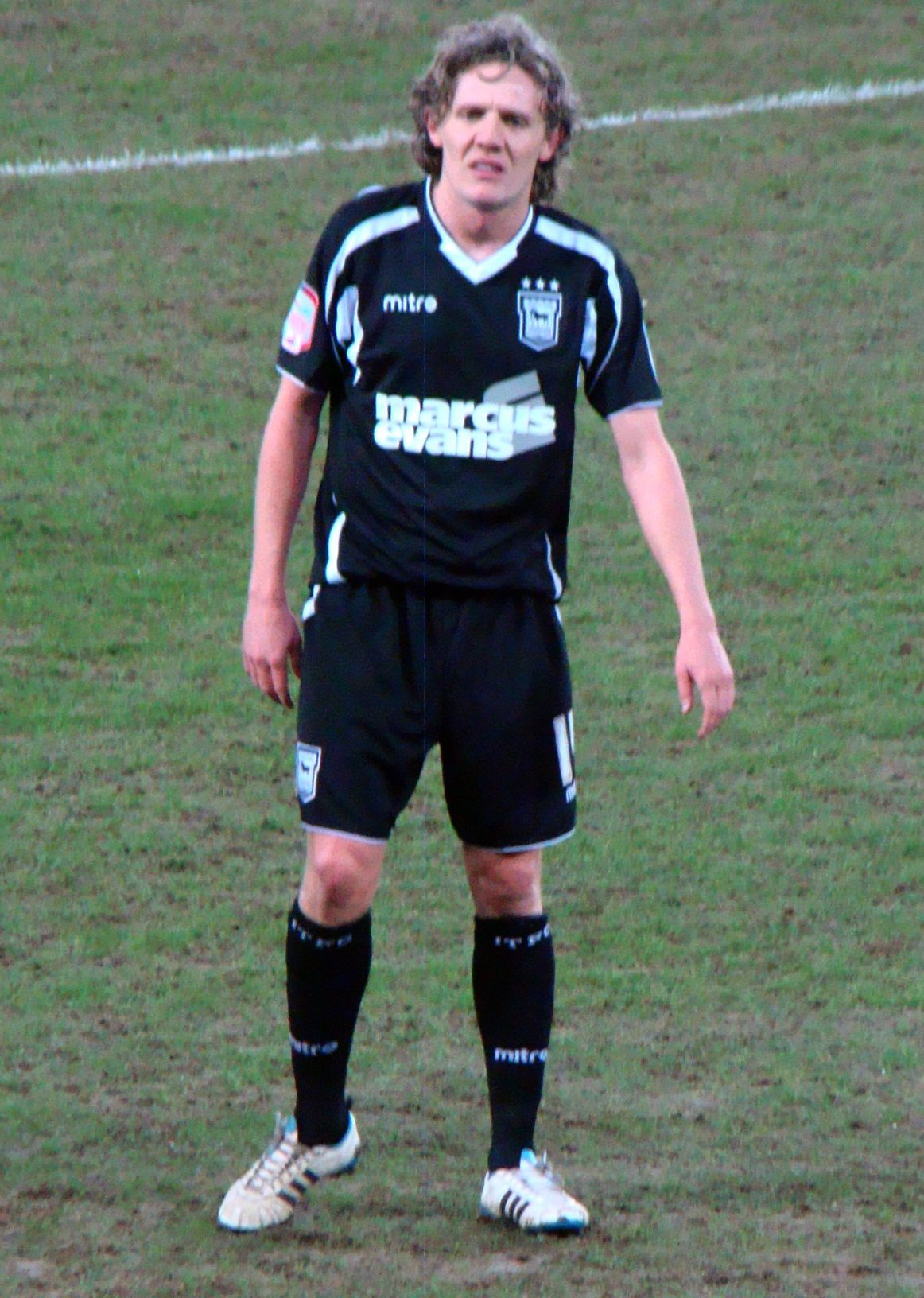
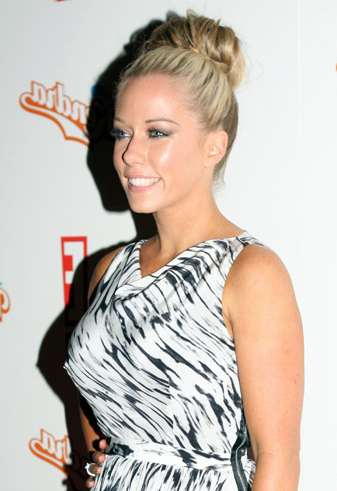
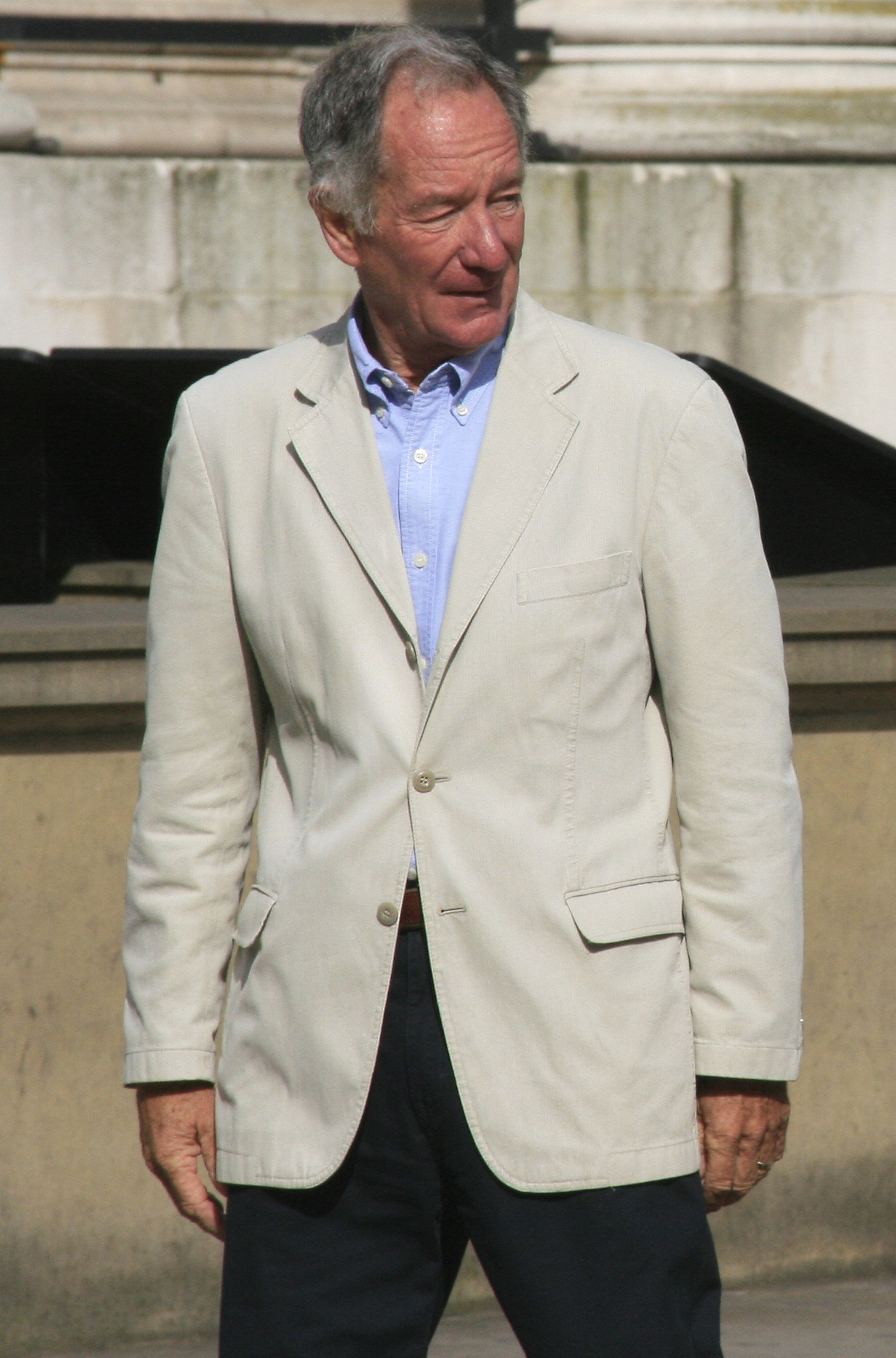
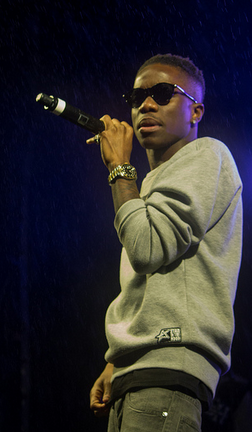
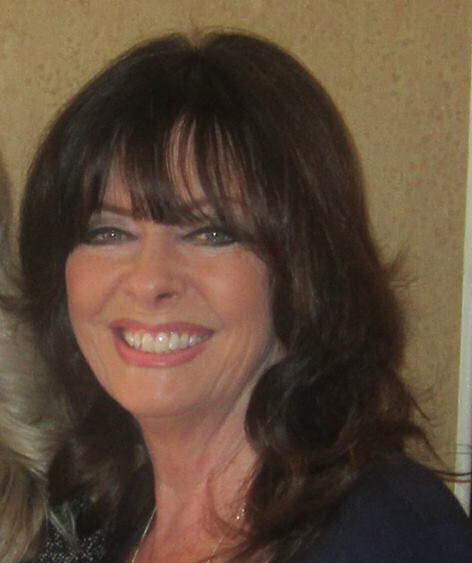
From left to right: Carl Fogarty, Craig Charles, Edwina Currie, Gemma Collins, Jake Quickenden, Jimmy Bullard, Kendra Wilkinson, Michael Buerk, Tinchy Stryder, and Vicki Michelle.
Not pictured: Melanie Sykes, and Nadia Forde.

Celebrity	Known for	Status
Carl "Foggy" Fogarty	Superbike racer	Winner on 7 December 2014
Jake Quickenden	The X Factor contestant	Runner-up on 7 December 2014
Melanie Sykes	Television presenter & model	Third place on 7 December 2014
Edwina Currie	Former Conservative Party politician	Eliminated 7th on 6 December 2014
Tinchy Stryder	Rapper	Eliminated 6th on 5 December 2014
Kendra Wilkinson	Reality television star & Playboy model	Eliminated 5th on 5 December 2014
Vicki Michelle	'Allo 'Allo! actress	Eliminated 4th on 4 December 2014
Michael Buerk	Newsreader & war journalist	Eliminated 3rd on 3 December 2014
Nadia Forde	Model & singer	Eliminated 2nd on 2 December 2014
Jimmy Bullard	Former Premier League footballer	Eliminated 1st on 1 December 2014
Craig Charles	Coronation Street & Red Dwarf actor	Withdrew on 19 November 2014
Gemma Collins	The Only Way Is Essex star	Withdrew on 18 November 2014

== Results and elimination ==
Indicates that the celebrity was immune from the vote
Indicates that the celebrity received the most votes from the public
Indicates that the celebrity received the fewest votes and was eliminated immediately (no bottom two)
Indicates that the celebrity was named as being in the bottom two
Indicates that the celebrity received the second fewest votes and were not named in the bottom two

Daily results per celebrity
Celebrity	Day 17	Day 18	Day 19	Day 20	Day 21	Day 22	Day 23		Trials	Dingo Dollar challenges
Celebrity	Day 17	Day 18	Day 19	Day 20	Day 21	Day 22	Round 1	Round 2	Trials	Dingo Dollar challenges
Foggy	2nd 23.59%	1st 23.59%	1st 28.30%	1st 26.0%	1st 26.54%	1st 38.54%	1st 46.71%	Winner; 59.91%	7	1
Jake	Immune	3rd 15.74%	3rd 15.20%	2nd 21.35%	2nd 21.46%	2nd 27.94%	2nd 37.62%	Runner-up; 40.09%	4	4
Melanie	1st 34.00%	2nd 18.44%	2nd 19.73%	3rd 16.06%	3rd 16.61%	3rd 18.57%	3rd 15.67%	Eliminated (Day 23)	5	2
Edwina	Immune	7th 6.34%	4th 9.82%	5th 11.21%	4th 14.73%	4th 14.91%	Eliminated (Day 22)		3	2
Tinchy	3rd 22.86%	4th 10.88%	5th 9.29%	4th 12.89%	5th 12.10%	Eliminated (Day 21)			3	1
Kendra	Immune	8th 5.05%	6th 8.13%	6th 7.07%	6th 8.56%	Eliminated (Day 21)			7	2
Vicki	Immune	6th 6.37%	7th 4.81%	7th 5.43%	Eliminated (Day 20)				1	2
Michael	Immune	5th 6.61%	8th 4.72%	Eliminated (Day 19)					1	4
Nadia	Immune	9th 4.64%	Eliminated (Day 18)						1	0
Jimmy	4th 19.55%	Eliminated (Day 17)							5	1
Craig	Withdrew (Day 4)								1	0
Gemma	Withdrew (Day 3)								0	0
Notes	1	None					2			
Bottom two (named in)	Jimmy, Tinchy	Kendra, Nadia	Edwina, Michael	Kendra, Vicki	Kendra, Tinchy	None				
Eliminated	Jimmy; 19.55% to save	Nadia; 4.64% to save	Michael; 4.72% to save	Vicki; 5.43% to save	Kendra; 8.56% to save	Edwina; 14.91% to save	Melanie; 15.67% to win	Jake; 40.09% to win		
Eliminated	Jimmy; 19.55% to save	Nadia; 4.64% to save	Michael; 4.72% to save	Vicki; 5.43% to save	Tinchy; 12.10% to save	Edwina; 14.91% to save	Melanie; 15.67% to win	Foggy; 59.91% to win		

=== Notes ===
- ^Note 1: As part of the Terror Tombs challenge the winners of this would gain immunity from the first elimination. The Galahs (Edwina, Jake, Kendra, Michael, Nadia and Vicki) won this and immunity.
- ^Note 2: The public were voting for who they wanted to win rather than to save.

== Bushtucker trials ==
The contestants take part in daily trials to earn food. These trials aim to test both physical and mental abilities. The winner is usually determined by the number of stars collected during the trial, with each star representing a meal earned by the winning contestant for their camp mates. From 2014, the public can vote on iOS devices, as well as voting via phone.

The public voted for who they wanted to face the trial
The contestants decided who did which trial
The trial was compulsory and neither the public nor celebrities decided who took part

Trial number	Air date	Name of trial	Celebrity participation	Public vote %	Winner/Number of stars	Notes
1	16 November	Snakes in a Drain	Foggy	—N/a	6/6 stars	1
2	17 November	Tunnel of Terror	Jimmy	51.87%	4/6 stars	2
3	19 November	Chamber of Horrors	Tinchy	33.68%	4/7 stars	3
4	19 November	Bush Bunker	Craig; Nadia	—N/a	7/10 stars	None
5	20 November	Terror Tavern	Jimmy; Kendra	19.62% 21.99%	10/10 stars	None
6	21 November	Cockroach Shaker	Kendra	16.79%	1/10 stars	4
7	22 November	The Catacombs of Doom	Kendra	30.60%	2/10 stars	5
8	23 November	Hell's Kitchen	Melanie	31.08%	9/10 stars	6
9 (Live)	23 November	The Critter Cube	Jake	18.82%	10/10 stars	None
10	24 November	The Critter Cube (Misery Match)	Jimmy	14.72%	1/1 star	7
11	26 November	Grim Gallery	Kendra	31.97%	1/10 stars	None
12	26 November	The Shed of Dread	Jimmy; Foggy	—N/a	10/10 stars	8
13	27 November	Little House on the Scary	Kendra	36.68%	10/10 stars	9
14	28 November	Pipes of Peril	Edwina; Kendra	32.12% 19.21%	6/10 stars	None
15	29 November	Cabin Fever	Edwina	18.97%	8/10 stars	None
16	30 November	Down the Chain	Foggy; Jake	—N/a	Jake	10
17	1 December	Vile Vineyard	Foggy; Jimmy; Melanie; Tinchy	—N/a	10/10 stars	None
18	2 December	The Deadly Dunker	Michael; Vicki	—N/a	7/9 stars	None
19	3 December	Boulder Dash	Foggy	—N/a	8/8 stars	None
20	4 December	The Catacombs of Doom – The Return	Tinchy	—N/a	6/7 stars	11
21	5 December	Critter Conveyor	Kendra; Melanie	—N/a	6/6 stars	None
22	6 December	Celebrity Cyclone	Edwina; Foggy; Jake; Melanie	—N/a	4/4 stars	None
23	7 December	Fill Your Face	Jake	—N/a	5/5 stars	None
24	7 December	Bushtucker Bonanza	Foggy	—N/a	5/5 stars	None
25	7 December	Drown and Out	Melanie	—N/a	5/5 stars	None

=== Notes ===
- ^1 The "Rescue Squad" (Jimmy, Kendra, Melanie, Michael and Tinchy) had to select one of the camp mates from the Slammer (Craig, Foggy, Gemma, Nadia and Vicki) to free. They chose Foggy, however he was automatically selected to take part in the first trial of the series.
- ^2 The campmates from the Slammer were excluded from this trial.
- ^3 Gemma, who was a late arrival in Croc Creek, and the camp mates from the Slammer, were excluded from this trial.
- ^4 Jake and Edwina were excluded from this trial due to being new arrivals in the camp.
- ^5 Jake, Jimmy and Edwina were excluded from this trial due to being involved in the secret mission of the "CIA".
- ^6 Jake, Jimmy, Edwina and Kendra were excluded from this trial due to being involved in the "CIA".
- ^7 The celebrity with the second highest number of votes for the live trial was given the opportunity to take part in a bonus trial, with the chance to win drinks for the camp. Jimmy came second to Jake in the public vote and took part in the bonus trial.
- ^8 Jimmy and Foggy were chosen by the producers to take part in the overnight challenge to win stars for the celebrities. Jimmy and Foggy endured the trial for 3 hours (reduced due to the other camp mates sacrificing their luxury items and postcards) and in the morning a rescue team of Tinchy and Nadia had to locate the boys at their secret camp to guarantee the meals for camp. They were directed to their position by their camp mates in Snake Rock (previously the Celebrity Slammer), competing tasks such as locating bottles and opening chests with keys to gain co-ordinates. Ultimately the trial was ended when bad weather prevented the use of helicopters, but the celebrities were still awarded the full ten stars.
- ^9 Edwina was excluded from this trial on medical grounds.
- ^10 This trial between Jake (from the Galahs) against Foggy (from the Wombats) decided which tribe would be given a meal for every member before the final immunity challenge, Terror Tombs.
- ^11 This trial was originally attempted by Kendra, but it was decided for it to be re-attempted by Tinchy.

== Star count ==
Celebrity	Number of stars earned	Percentage
Carl "Foggy" Fogarty	43/43 stars	100%
Craig Charles	7/10 stars	70%
Edwina Currie	18/24 stars	75%
Gemma Collins	—N/a	—N/a
Jake Quickenden	19/19 stars	100%
Jimmy Bullard	35/37 stars	95%
Kendra Wilkinson	36/66 stars	55%
Melanie Sykes	34/35 stars	97%
Michael Buerk	7/9 stars	78%
Nadia Forde	7/10 stars	70%
Tinchy Stryder	20/24 stars	83%
Vicki Michelle	7/9 stars	78%

== Dingo Dollar challenges ==
Members from camp will take part in the challenge to win 'Dingo Dollars'. If they win them then they can then take the dollars to the 'Outback Shack', where they can exchange them for camp luxuries with Kiosk Keith. Two options are given and the celebrities can choose which they would like to win. However, to win their luxury, a question is asked to the celebrities still in camp via the telephone box. If the question is answered correctly, the celebrities can take the items back to camp. If wrong, they receive nothing and Kiosk Keith will close the shack. The second and third challenges had a twist with them, and was sabotaged by members of the "Celebrity Intelligence Agency " (CIA).

The celebrities got the question correct
The celebrities got the question wrong

Episode	Air date	Celebrities	Prizes available	Prize chosen
4	20 November	Melanie; Michael	Crisps; Brownies	Brownies
5	21 November	Michael; Tinchy; Vicki	Marshmallows; Strawberries	N/A (sabotaged by "CIA" team)
6	22 November	Edwina; Jake; Jimmy; Kendra	—N/a	The "CIA" team got to sit in a hot tub with drinks, but they then had to dunk their clothing in gunk.
14	1 December	Michael; Vicki	Cheese and crackers Crumpets and butter	Cheese and crackers
15	2 December	Jake; Kendra	Digestive biscuits Crisps	Digestive biscuits
16	3 December	Michael; Melanie	Coffee; Tea	Coffee
17	4 December	Jake; Foggy	Mini choc ices Kendra and Vicki's letters from home	Kendra and Vicki's letters from home
18	5 December	Edwina; Jake	Small sausage rolls Scones, butter and strawberry jam	Scones, butter and strawberry jam

== Ratings ==
Official ratings are taken from BARB. There were no shows on the 18 and 25 November due to live Champions League football being shown On ITV, but Get Me Out of Here! NOW! still aired as normal.

Episode	Airdate	Official ITV rating (millions)	ITV Weekly rank	Official ITV HD rating (millions)	Official ITV +1 rating (millions)	Total ITV viewers (millions)	Overnight share
1	16 November	9.45	1	2.17	0.35	11.97	41.2%
2	17 November	8.70	1	2.18	0.54	11.42	38.2%
3	19 November	7.92	3	1.83	0.60	10.35	34.3%
4	20 November	7.75	5	1.93	0.56	10.24	35.6%
5	21 November	7.50	8	1.77	0.50	9.77	34.5%
6	22 November	7.80	4	1.77	0.44	10.01	37.3%
7	23 November	8.44	2	2.05	0.47	10.96	37.4%
8	24 November	8.13	2	1.87	0.64	10.64	35.0%
9	26 November	7.53	7	1.80	0.68	10.01	32.0%
10	27 November	7.73	4	1.84	0.70	10.27	34.6%
11	28 November	7.62	5	1.81	0.48	9.91	33.6%
12	29 November	7.86	3	1.87	0.35	10.08	38.5%
13	30 November	8.57	1	1.98	0.38	10.93	36.0%
14	1 December	7.82	2	1.96	0.49	10.27	35.3%
15	2 December	7.00	10	1.84	0.53	9.37	29.6%
16	3 December	7.12	6	1.67	0.42	9.21	30.5%
17	4 December	7.04	8	1.85	0.39	9.28	32.6%
18	5 December	7.02	9	1.92	0.38	9.32	33.5%
19	6 December	7.41	4	1.84	0.38	9.63	35.4%
20	7 December	8.89	1	2.26	0.32	11.47	40.7%
Series average	2014	7.87	—N/a	1.91	0.48	10.26	35.29%
Coming Out	10 December	5.51	12				25.9%
