= The Only Way Is Essex series 17 =

The Only Way Is Essex
- Season 17
- No. of episodes: 14

Release
- Original network: ITVBe
- Original release: 28 February – 13 April 2016

Series chronology
- ← Previous; Series 16 Next → Series 18

The seventeenth series of the British semi-reality television programme The Only Way Is Essex was confirmed on 3 June 2015 when it was announced that it had renewed for at least a further six series, taking it up to 21 series. It is the second series to be included in its current contract. The series will launch on 28 February 2016. Ahead of the series it was announced that cast member Jess Wright had quit the show having appeared since the first series in 2010. Ferne McCann also confirmed that she would be taking a break from the show but would be back. It was the first series to include new cast members Chloe Meadows, Courtney Green, and Chris and Jon Clark. Jon previously appeared on ITV2's Love Island.

This series also featured the show's 200th episode. On 9 March 2016, it was announced that former Ex on the Beach star and Celebrity Big Brother housemate Megan McKenna has joined the cast and would be making her debut during the 200th episode. However, Megan previously made a brief appearance on the first Essexmas special in 2010 where she originally auditioned for Jess Wright's new girl group. On 13 March 2016, ahead of the show's milestone 200th episode, a special episode titled "The Power of TOWIE" aired hosted by Mark Wright, where cast past and present united to discuss the show's history.

== Cast ==
- Billie Faiers
- Bobby Cole Norris
- Carol Wright
- Chloe Lewis
- Chloe Meadows
- Chloe Sims
- Chris Clark
- Courtney Green
- Dan Edgar
- Danni Armstrong
- Debbie Douglas
- Ferne McCann
- Gemma Collins
- Georgia Kousoulou
- Jake Hall
- James "Arg" Argent
- James "Diags" Bennewith
- James "Lockie" Lock
- Jon Clark
- Kate Wright
- Lewis Bloor
- Liam Blackwell
- Lydia Bright
- Megan McKenna
- Mike Hassini
- Nicole Bass
- Nikki Blackwell
- Pete Wicks
- Tommy Mallet
- Vas Morgan

== Episodes ==
No. overall	No. in series	Title	Original release date	Duration	UK viewers
196	1	"Episode 1"	28 February 2016	50 minutes	982,000
With Carol still mourning Nanny Pat, Debbie decides to take her out to celebrate her late Mother's life, whilst Gemma confesses to Billie that she knows Lockie has been seeing somebody but is scared to mention it to Danni. Courtney and Chloe M introduce themselves to the Essex gang and Lockie instantly takes a shine to Courtney, whilst Mike flirts with Chloe M. A revealing text from Gemma causes upset for Danni as she is forced to confront Lockie about the girl he's been seeing, however he denies all knowledge. Elsewhere the boys continue to isolate Lewis.
197	2	"Episode 2"	2 March 2016	50 minutes	911,000
As Danni tries to get to the bottom of the rumours, she begins to realise Gemma is the only source and maybe she wasn't telling the whole truth. With Lewis still public enemy number one, he makes amends with the boys he's upset. Pete has a peace offering for Chloe S after upsetting her daughter and breaking a promise to her, whilst Lockie has some celebrating to do after the launch of his new restaurant. Elsewhere, Chloe M dates Mike, and Courtney dates Chris, and Courtney reveals the bombshell that she had the opportunity to get with Lockie but turned him down.
198	3	"Episode 3"	6 March 2016	50 minutes	1,107,000
Georgia hears a rumour that Courtney and Lockie have slept together and decides to do some digging to get to the truth before she tells Danni. Jon opens up to Chloe S about his past relationships, then admits to Bobby that he wants to ask her out on a date. Tommy and Georgia find themselves bickering when she accuses him of staying quiet about Lockie, questioning his loyalties. Carol breaks down at the Mother's Day auction when Debbie gives her a sentimental gift, and Courtney is shocked when Georgia outright quizzes her about the rumours she's heard.
199	4	"Episode 4"	9 March 2016	50 minutes	1,158,000
The Danni and Courtney feud is on everybody's mind and Chris and Jon refuse to clean Courtney's windows having agreed to do it in the Mother's Day auction. Chloe M realises the extent of her feelings towards Mike when she gets jealous of him speaking to another girl, and the boys get competitive during the football match. Bobby attempts to get more manly and meets a potential new love interest, and Team Real win the football match 6-0. Courtney and Chloe M end up isolating themselves further following another confrontation with the girls.
–	–	"The Power of TOWIE"	13 March 2016	60 minutes	482,000
A one-off documentary hosted by former cast member Mark Wright discussing the history of the show. Celebrities as well as cast members past and present unite to talk about the Essex look, the popularity of the show, the fame the cast members have achieved from appearing in the series as well as the influence it has had on the economy.
200	5	"TOWIE: The 200th episode"	13 March 2016	60 minutes	1,121,000
Lydia and Arg plan a 1920's themed party to celebrate Essex. Courtney is fed up of her treatment from the other girls and vows to put a stop to it, whilst the boys think the football match has broken the divide between them. At the dinner party, Pete introduces Megan McKenna as his date, who is quick to stand up for her friend Courtney. Kate gives Dan an earful for not paying her enough attention, and Chloe M is annoyed that Mike has been dating somebody else. Elsewhere, an almighty row erupts as Chloe S mishears a conversation about her, and she's torn when both Liam and Jon compete for her affection.
201	6	"Episode 6"	16 March 2016	50 minutes	1,135,000
A video is released of Danni all over a boy and she brings it on herself to explain herself to Lockie, but can she be completely honest with her feelings towards him? Jon admits he doesn't remember the kiss he and Chloe S shared but still asks her out on a date, unaware she's already agreed to go on a date with Liam. Kate and Dan's relationship hits the rocks when she becomes increasingly jealous of him spending more time with the boys rather than her, and Georgia gets emotional when she realises the damage she has caused for Courtney.
202	7	"Episode 7"	20 March 2016	50 minutes	1,115,000
Megan is far from happy to hear what Kate has said about her behind her back, but Pete assures her that it was said as a joke instead of maliciously. Georgia plans a Greek themed party, inviting Courtney and Chloe M to prove there's no animosity between the girls. The boys plan an SAS training day to prove which group is the most macho and Arg is left gutted when Team Real want him as their manager rather than competing for them. Jon takes Chloe S to a museum for their first date then the pair get cosy at Georgia's party. Stavros Fratley arrive as party guests.
203	8	"Episode 8"	23 March 2016	50 minutes	1,070,000
Chris admits he doesn't think it's getting serious between him and Courtney just yet, but has she other ideas? Pete is disappointed with some of the boys when he finds out they've been badmouthing him and Megan, and Tommy is the one who gets it in the neck. Team Real are victorious once again during the SAS challenge, but the girls think their competitiveness is going a bit too far. Megan and Kate have it out as they come face-to-face for the first time since their drama, and Jon surprises Chloe S by taking her on another romantic date.
204	9	"Episode 9"	27 March 2016	50 minutes	1,095,000
Lockie is made to be Team Real's bitch as he takes one for the team and takes the forfeit. Whilst Jon admits he's liking the way things are going with Chloe S, she has a few concerns about their age gap. The Bright's host an Easter egg hunt for the group and Lydia makes it her mission to help keep Arg away from the chocolate and to support him on his new weight loss plans. Chloe L seeks advice from Danni when her relationship with Jake begins to fizzle out, and the boys feel that Tommy is offloading his problem with Megan onto Pete instead.
205	10	"Episode 10"	30 March 2016	50 minutes	1,033,000
Jake finds it difficult to keep his cool around Danni after hearing she's been giving Chloe L unwanted advice about their relationship, and she finds herself in Lockie's bad books too when he rages with her about comparing other people's relationship to theirs. Kate confronts Courtney over their Twitter feud, and Megan is angry to be dragged further into the drama. Chloe S fears there is no chemistry between her and Jon, and Liam gets a record deal. Elsewhere, Chloe and Chloe M's attempts to clear the air with the girls backfire when they end up clashing with Danni and Kate.
206	11	"Episode 11"	3 April 2016	50 minutes	1,242,000
Chloe S celebrates her graduation and leaves her party planning in the capable hands of Diags, and wants to invite Jon despite their recent fling coming to an end. Courtney and Chloe M continue to isolate themselves and Chris is the one to tell them that they're in the wrong, but they feel there are double standards when Mike gets away with venting on Twitter about them. Kate rages to hear that Chloe M has tried to come between her and Dan, and Tommy and Jake clash over Liam's loyalties with the girls. Megan suggests the girls all go away for a weekend to bond without a club environment but Kate refuses.
207	12	"Episode 12"	6 April 2016	50 minutes	1,197,000
The girl's trip away features a lot of awkwardness as Chloe M and Courtney once again attempt to clear the air. Lockie and Jake clash again in an ultimate contest of Connect 4 to find out who the real "alpha" is. Elsewhere, a game of "I Have Never" descends into chaos when Chloe L accuses Megan of sleeping with Jake, and Chloe S urges Lockie to be honest about his feelings towards Danni. Chloe L digs for the truth surrounding the rumours about Jake but is more confused when Chloe M's story doesn't add up, is this the final nail in the coffin for her relationship?
208	13	"Episode 13"	10 April 2016	50 minutes	1,261,000
Everybody is torn over whom to believe as Jake and Megan continue to deny sleeping together, but Chloe M's slip-up may have confirmed that they have. Lockie admits that he wants to get back with Danni, and tries to be honest with her over his feelings. Elsewhere, Liam shoots his new music video, and Georgia gets emotional being caught in the middle of the Jake and Chloe L drama. An angry Courtney confronts Mike over his abusive retweets about her, and Chloe L meets up with Chloe M and Megan to get the whole truth.
209	14	"Episode 14"	13 April 2016	50 minutes	1,292,000
It's make or break for three couples in Essex following recent troubles, and Debbie prepares to celebrate her birthday with a huge punk party. Bobby introduces his new boyfriend to the group and receives approval from Gemma. Jake and Chloe L finally have it out with each other and put their relationship to bed, whilst Kate begins to feel sorry for Chloe M after all the latest drama with Mike. Despite the rumours, Pete and Megan make their relationship official, and Danni and Lockie are finally honest with each other over their feelings and agree to take things slow.

== Reception ==
=== Ratings ===
Episode	Date	Official ITVBe rating	ITVBe weekly rank	ITVBe+1 viewers	Total ITVBe viewers
Episode 1	28 February 2016	951,000	1	33,000	982,000
Episode 2	2 March 2016	884,000	2	27,000	911,000
Episode 3	6 March 2016	1,075,000	1	32,000	1,107,000
Episode 4	9 March 2016	1,118,000	1	40,000	1,158,000
The Power of TOWIE	13 March 2016	452,000	3	30,000	482,000
TOWIE: The 200th episode	13 March 2016	1,063,000	2	58,000	1,121,000
Episode 6	16 March 2016	1,104,000	1	31,000	1,135,000
Episode 7	20 March 2016	1,064,000	2	51,000	1,115,000
Episode 8	23 March 2016	996,000	2	74,000	1,070,000
Episode 9	27 March 2016	1,019,000	1	76,000	1,095,000
Episode 10	30 March 2016	978,000	2	55,000	1,033,000
Episode 11	3 April 2016	1,143,000	1	99,000	1,242,000
Episode 12	6 April 2016	1,150,000	2	47,000	1,197,000
Episode 13	10 April 2016	1,199,000	1	62,000	1,261,000
Episode 14	13 April 2016	1,232,000	1	60,000	1,292,000
Series average		1,070,000	1	53,000	1,123,000
