= I'm a Celebrity...Get Me Out of Here! (British TV series) series 15 =

I'm a Celebrity...Get Me Out of Here!
- Series 15
- Presented by: Anthony McPartlin; Declan Donnelly
- No. of days: 22
- No. of castaways: 13
- Winner: Vicky Pattison
- Runner-up: George Shelley
- Companion show: I'm a Celebrity...Get Me Out of Here! NOW!
- No. of episodes: 21

Release
- Original network: ITV
- Original release: 15 November – 6 December 2015

Series chronology
- ← Previous; Series 14 Next → Series 16

I'm a Celebrity...Get Me Out of Here! returned for its fifteenth series on 15 November 2015 on ITV.

On 11 October 2015, a 5-second teaser aired on ITV for the first time, with more short trailers following, with Ant & Dec yelling "Let's get ready to jungle!", a pun on their well-known song "Let's Get Ready to Rhumble".

Geordie Shore's Vicky Pattison won the show on 6 December 2015, with Union J singer George Shelley finishing runner up. This was the second time that a late-entry contestant had won the show, the first being Christopher Biggins in 2007.

Ant & Dec both returned as presenters of the main show, whilst Joe Swash and Laura Whitmore returned to present the ITV2 spin-off show, I'm a Celebrity...Get Me Out of Here! NOW!, alongside David Morgan, who replaced Rob Beckett.

== Celebrities ==
The celebrity cast line-up for the fifteenth series was confirmed on 9 November 2015. Spencer Matthews withdrew on 20 November, because of health issues. Lady Colin Campbell also withdrew on 1 December, also for medical reasons.

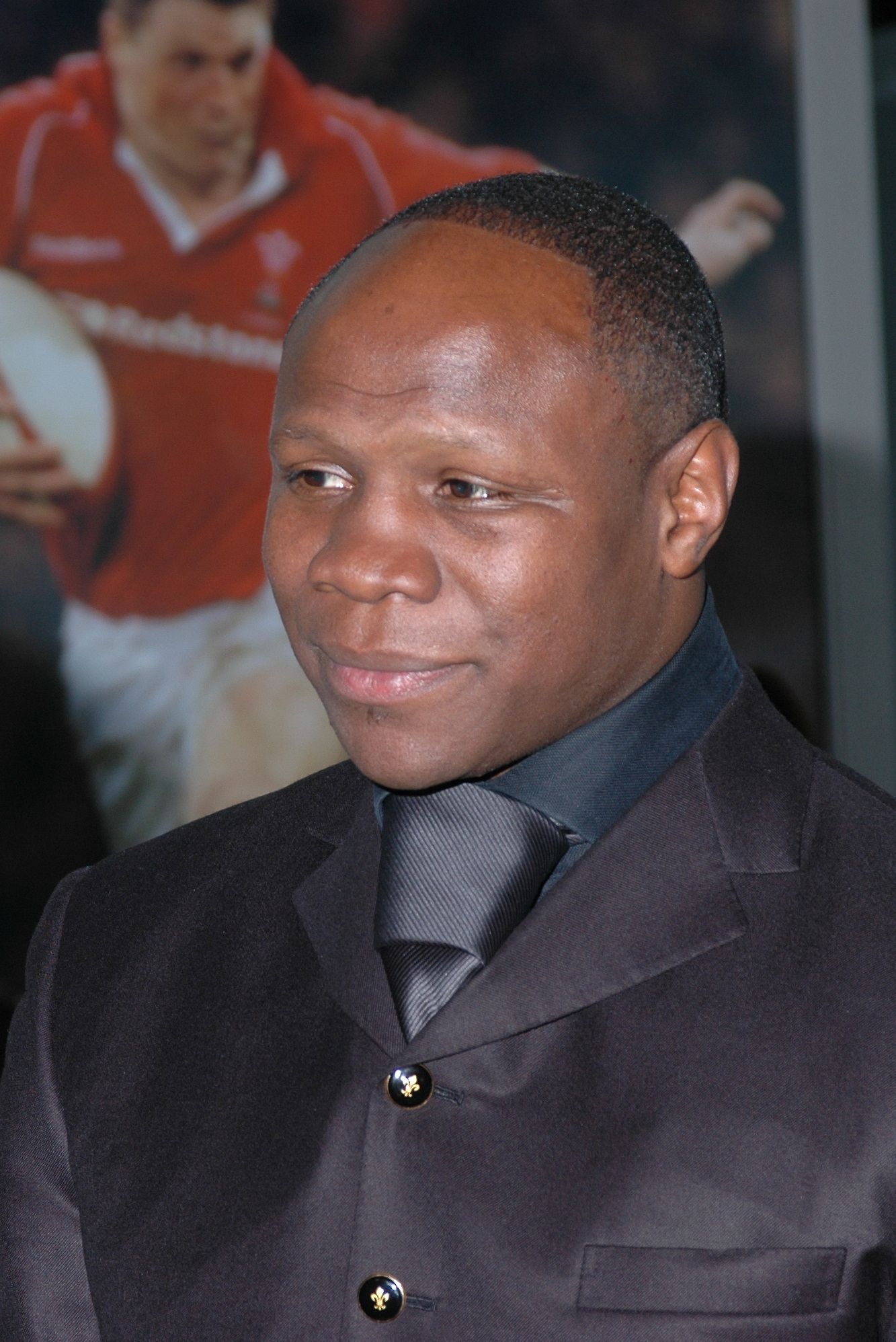
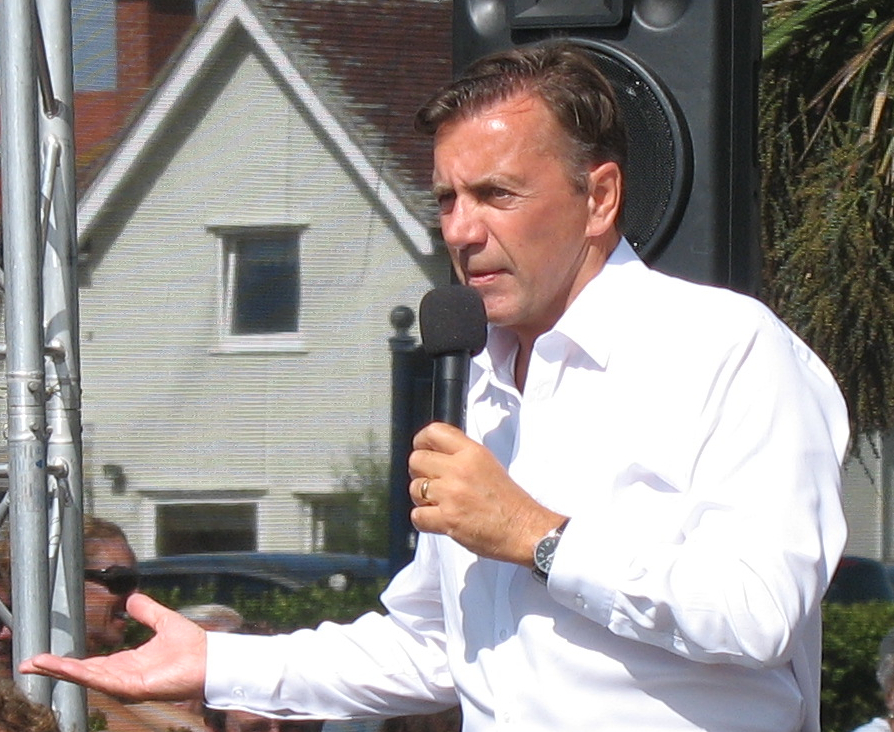
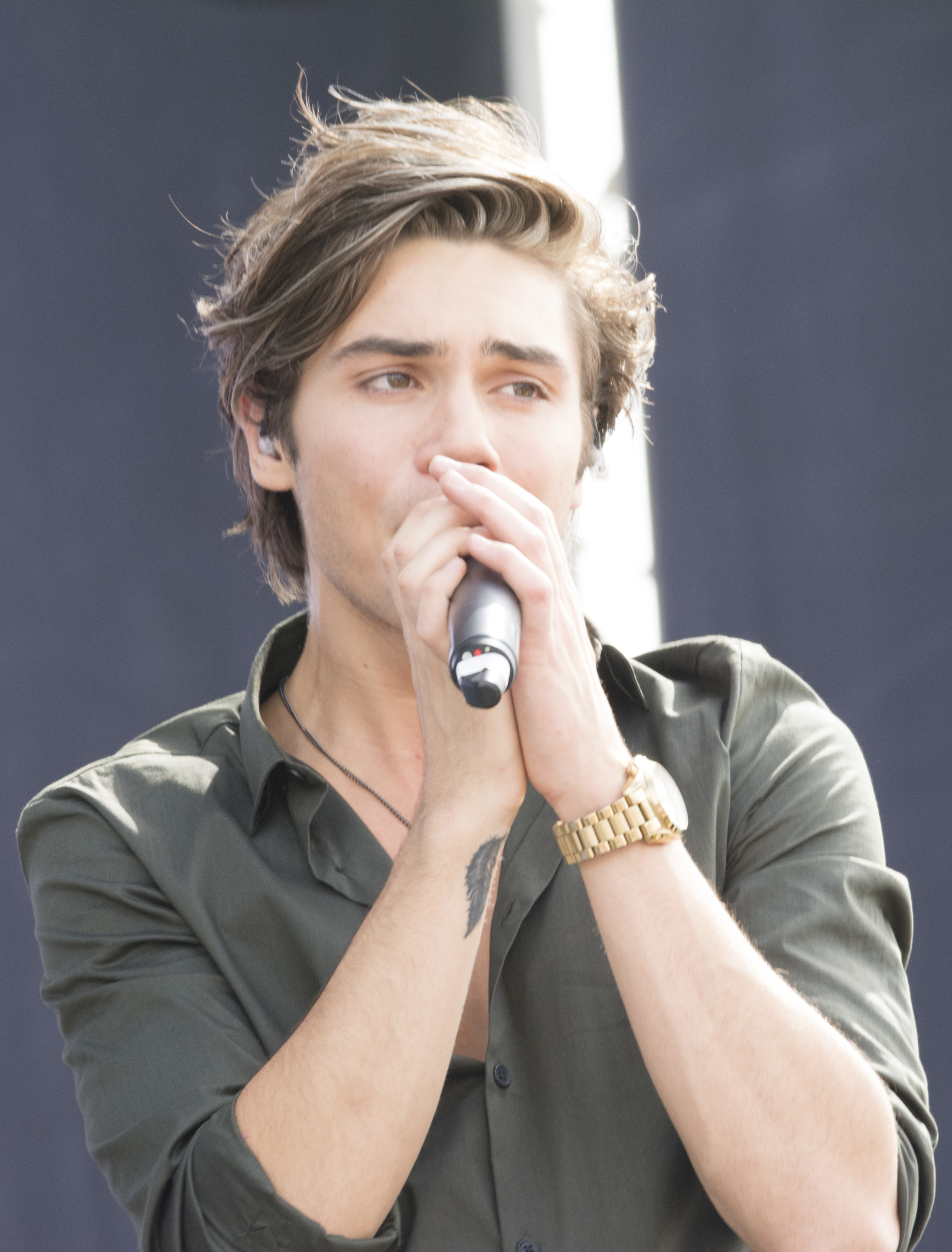
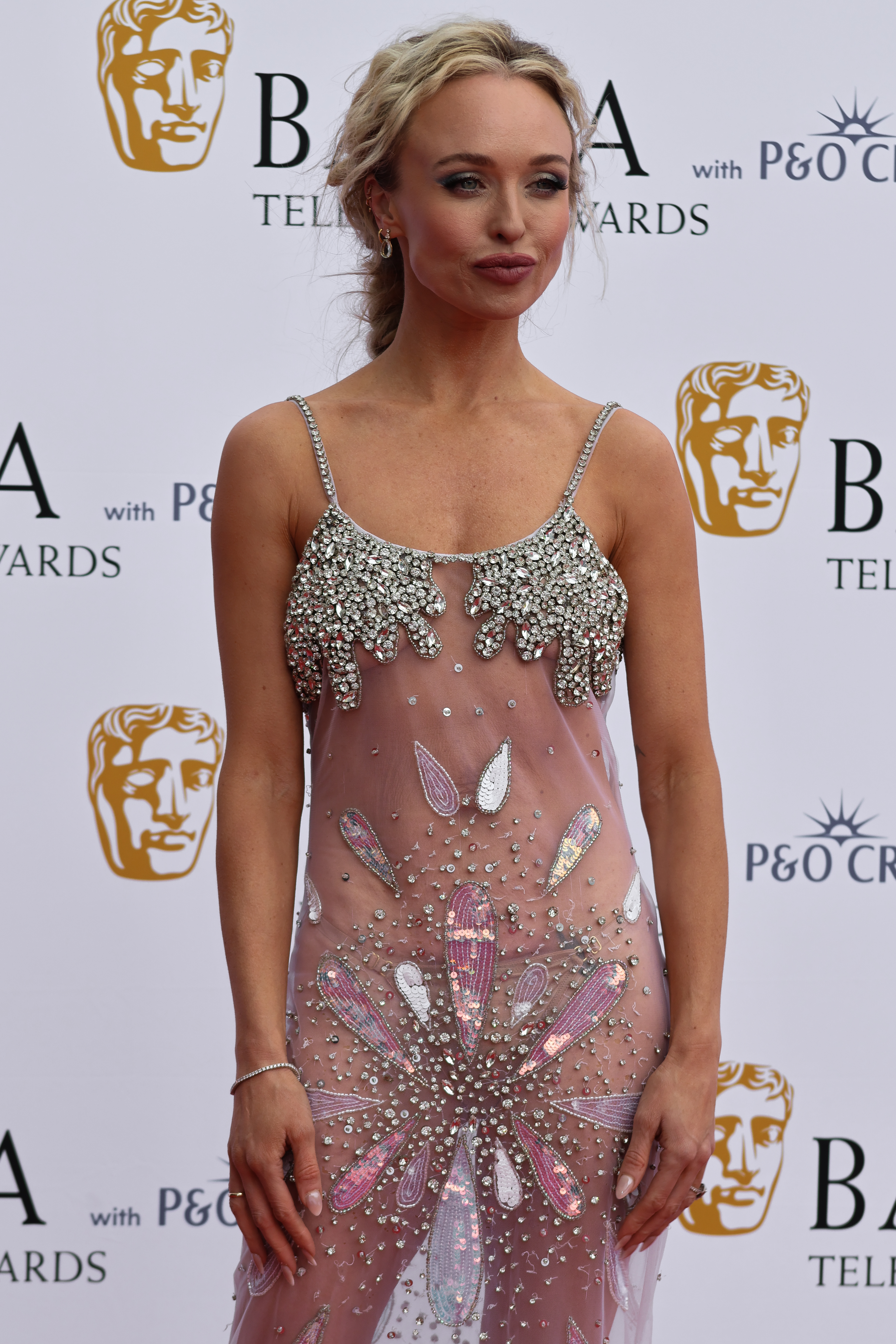
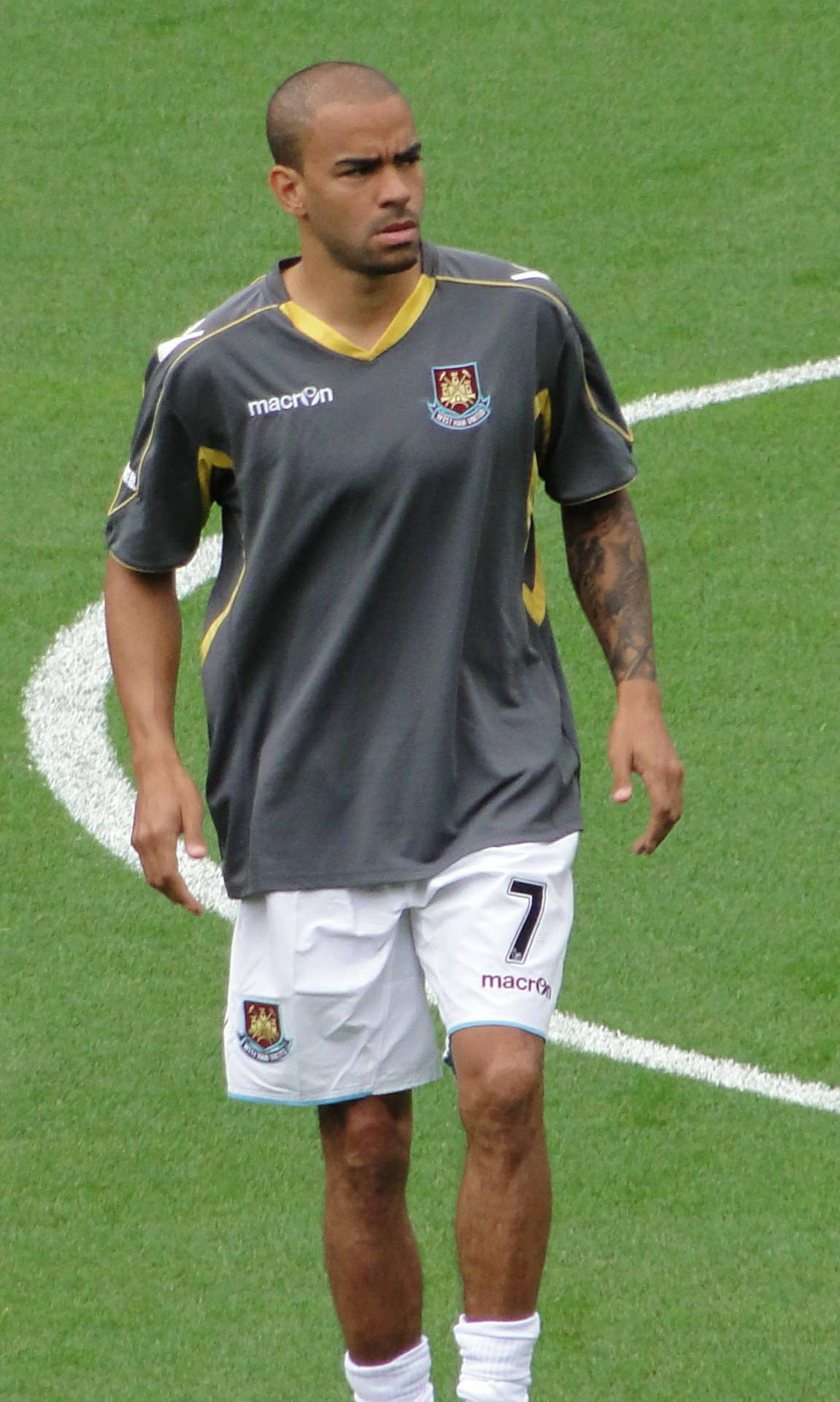
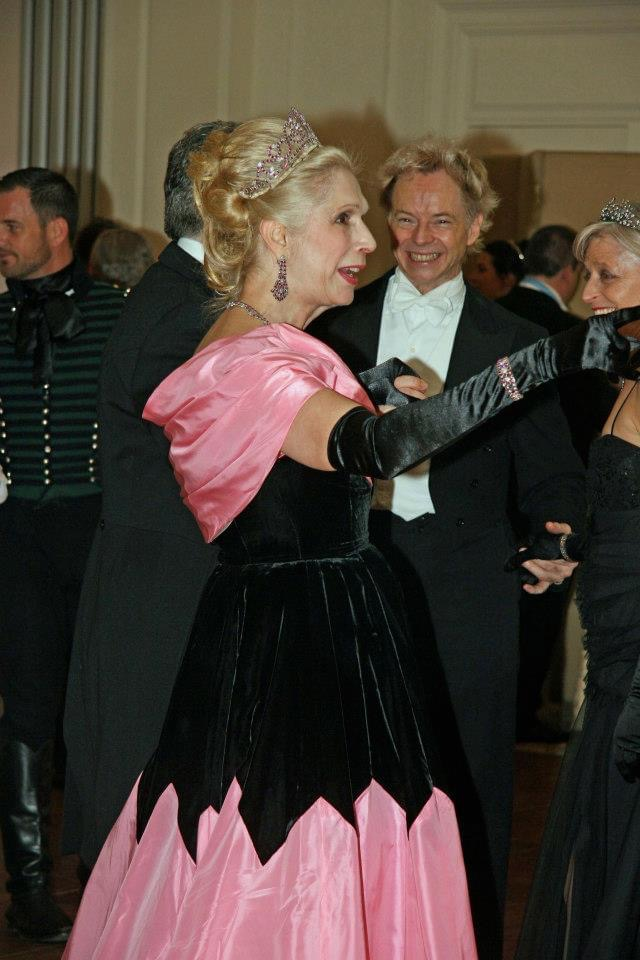
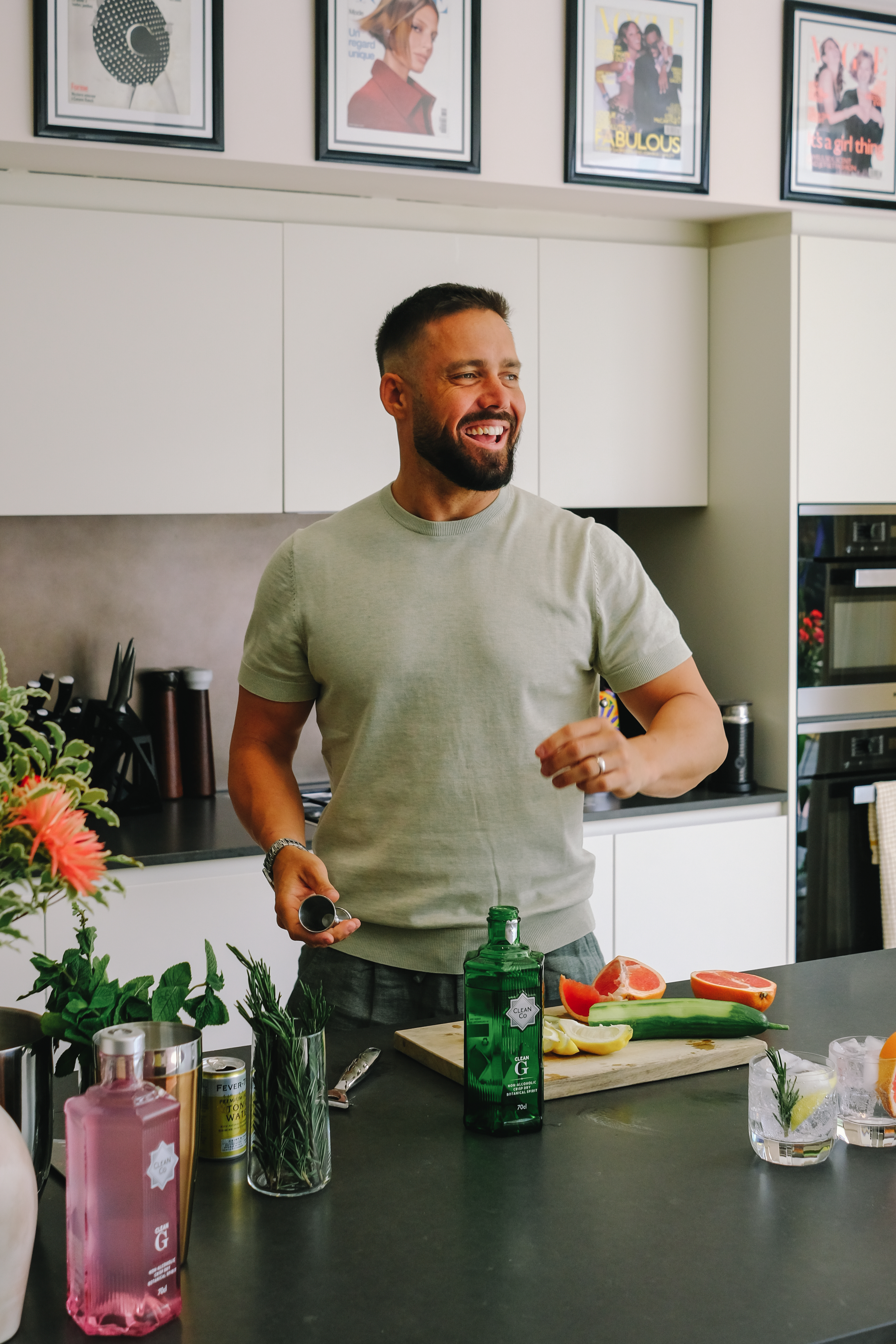
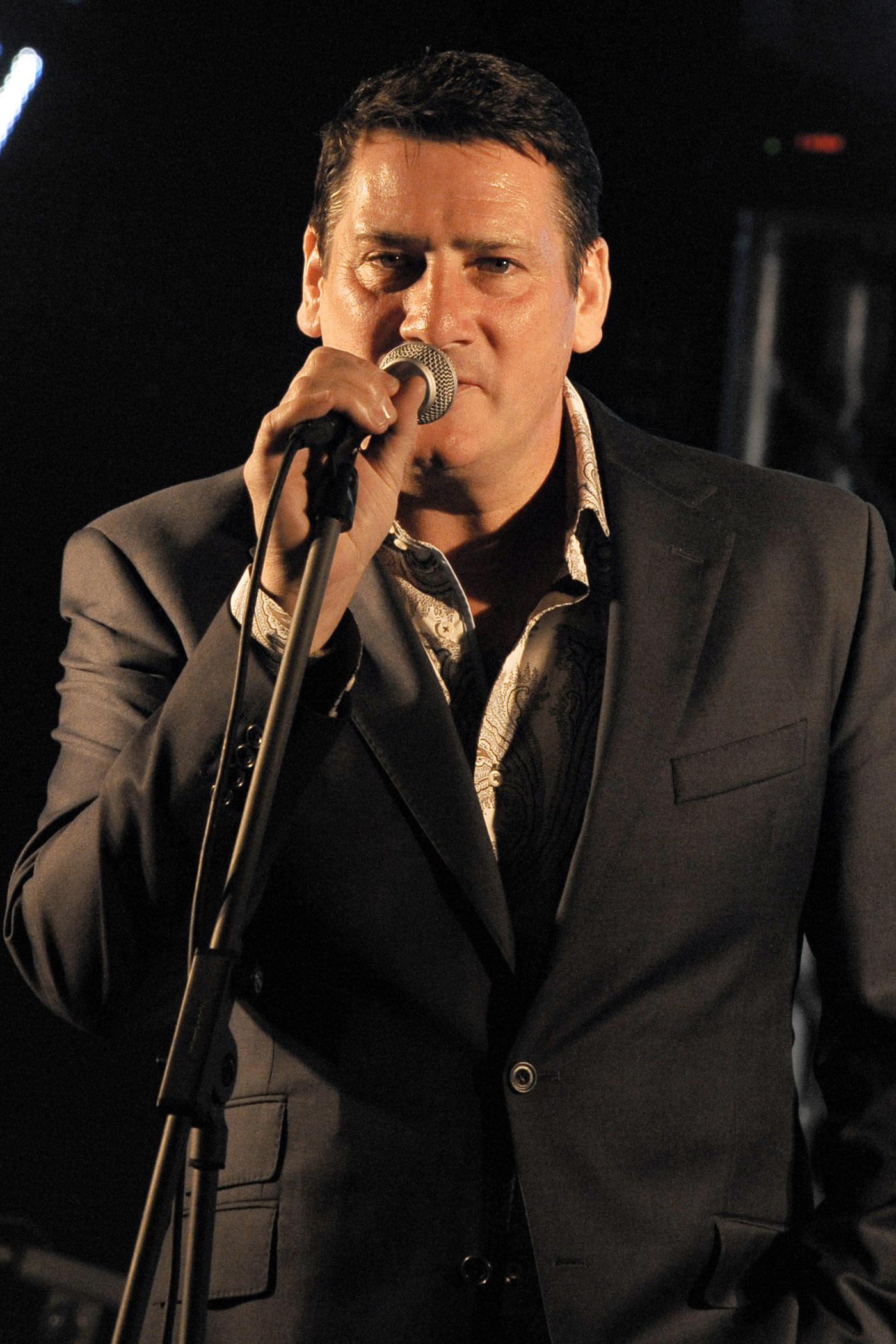
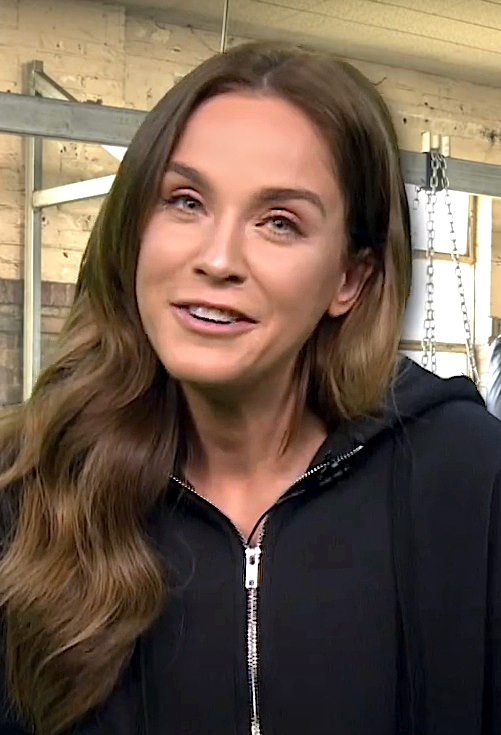
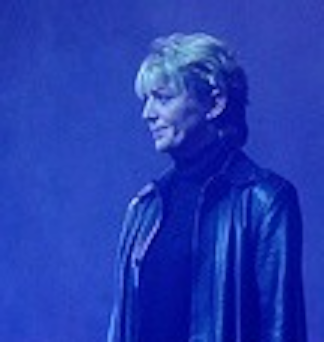
From left to right: Chris Eubank, Duncan Bannatyne, George Shelley, Jorgie Porter, Kieron Dyer, Lady Colin Campbell, Spencer Matthews, Tony Hadley, Vicky Pattison, and Yvette Fielding.
Not pictured: Brian Friedman, Ferne McCann, and Susannah Constantine.

Celebrity	Known for	Status
Vicky Pattison	Geordie Shore star	Winner on 6 December 2015
George Shelley	Union J singer	Runner-up on 6 December 2015
Ferne McCann	The Only Way Is Essex star	Third place on 6 December 2015
Kieron Dyer	Former England footballer	Eliminated 8th on 5 December 2015
Jorgie Porter	Hollyoaks actress	Eliminated 7th on 5 December 2015
Tony Hadley	Spandau Ballet singer	Eliminated 6th on 4 December 2015
Duncan Bannatyne	Dragon's Den panelist & entrepreneur	Eliminated 5th on 3 December 2015
Lady Colin "Lady C" Campbell	Royal biographer & socialite	Withdrew on 1 December 2015
Chris Eubank	Retired professional boxer	Eliminated 4th on 1 December 2015
Yvette Fielding	Television presenter	Eliminated 3rd on 30 November 2015
Brian Friedman	Dancer & choreographer	Eliminated 2nd on 29 November 2015
Susannah Constantine	Fashion journalist & television presenter	Eliminated 1st on 27 November 2015
Spencer Matthews	Made in Chelsea star	Withdrew on 20 November 2015

== Results and elimination ==
Indicates that the celebrity was immune from the vote
Indicates that the celebrity received the most votes from the public
Indicates that the celebrity received the fewest votes and was eliminated immediately (no bottom two
Indicates that the celebrity was named as being in the bottom two
Indicates that the celebrity received the second fewest votes and were not named in the bottom two

Daily results per celebrity
	Day 13	Day 15	Day 16	Day 17	Day 19	Day 20	Day 21	Day 22		Trials	Dingo Dollar challenges
	Day 13	Day 15	Day 16	Day 17	Day 19	Day 20	Day 21	Round 1	Round 2	Trials	Dingo Dollar challenges
Vicky	Immune	1st 24.05%	1st 24.09%	1st 26.68%	1st 29.81%	1st 34.03%	1st 37.01%	1st 52.92%	1st 70.17%	8	3
George	Immune	2nd 16.08%	2nd 17.01%	2nd 15.49%	3rd 13.93%	3rd 16.1%	3rd 16.42%	2nd 24.53%	2nd 29.83%	7	1
Ferne	3rd 13.33%	6th 6.89%	4th 9.02%	4th 9.47%	2nd 17.9%	2nd 16.63%	2nd 18.41%	3rd 22.55%	Eliminated (Day 22)	7	1
Kieron	4th 10.16%	7th 6.48%	6th 7.65%	7th 7.35%	5th 12.09%	4th 12.54%	4th 15.48%	Eliminated (Day 21)		8	1
Jorgie	2nd 19.17%	3rd 11.38%	3rd 11.68%	3rd 13.76%	4th 12.31%	5th 12.16%	5th 12.68%	Eliminated (Day 21)		8	3
Tony	7th 7.4%	5th 7.01%	5th 7.72%	6th 7.5%	6th 7.07%	6th 8.55%	Eliminated (Day 20)			5	3
Duncan	Immune	8th 6.32%	7th 7.34%	5th 9.42%	7th 6.89%	Eliminated (Day 19)				3	2
Lady C	1st 20.73%	4th 9.41%	8th 7.31%	8th 6.25%	Withdrew (Day 17)					8	0
Chris	8th 6.37%	9th 4.67%	9th 4.43%	9th 4.07%	Eliminated (Day 17)					3	1
Yvette	6th 8.28%	10th 4.36%	10th 3.75%	Eliminated (Day 16)						3	0
Brian	5th 8.97%	11th 3.34%	Eliminated (Day 15)							5	1
Susannah	9th 5.58%	Eliminated (Day 13)								3	0
Spencer	Withdrew (Day 5)									1	0
Notes	1	2	None		3	None		4			
Bottom two (named in)	Chris, Susannah	Brian, Yvette	Duncan, Yvette	Chris, Tony	Duncan, Tony	Ferne, Tony	Jorgie, Kieron	None			
Eliminated	Susannah; 5.58% to save	Brian; 3.34% to save	Yvette; 3.75% to save	Chris; 4.07% to save	Duncan; 6.89% to save	Tony; 8.55% to save	Jorgie; 12.68% to save	Ferne; 22.55% to win	George; 29.83% to win		
Eliminated	Susannah; 5.58% to save	Brian; 3.34% to save	Yvette; 3.75% to save	Chris; 4.07% to save	Duncan; 6.89% to save	Tony; 8.55% to save	Kieron; 15.48% to save	Ferne; 22.55% to win	Vicky; 70.17% to win		

=== Notes ===
- ^Note 1: The celebrities were split into four teams for a set of challenges to earn immunity; Green (Lady C, Susannah and Yvette), Pink (Duncan, George and Vicky), Purple (Brian, Jorgie and Tony) and Yellow (Chris, Ferne and Kieron). The Pink team won, earning immunity.
- ^Note 2: There was no elimination on Day 14, with the votes being carried over and added to the next day's results.
- ^Note 3: There was no elimination on Day 18, due to Lady C's withdrawal. Viewers were given refunds for their votes for Day 18 and lines were reopened for the impending Day 19 eviction.
- ^Note 4: The public were voting for who they wanted to win rather than to save.

== Bushtucker trials ==
The contestants take part in daily trials to earn food. These trials aim to test both physical and mental abilities. The winner is usually determined by the number of stars collected during the trial, with each star representing a meal earned by the winning contestant for their camp mates. As of 2014, the public can vote for who takes part in the trials via the I'm a Celebrity... app, from iOS devices.

All Trials

The public voted for who they wanted to face the trial
The contestants decided who would face the trial
The trial was compulsory and neither the public nor celebrities decided who took part

Trial number	Air date	Name of trial	Celebrity participation	Public vote	Winner/Number of stars	Notes
1	15 November	Hell-evated	Chris; George; Jorgie; Kieron; Lady C Tony	—N/a	10/10 stars	1
2	16 November	Disaster Chef	Jorgie; Lady C	16.30% 21.52%	10/10 stars	None
3	18 November	Panic Pit	Lady C	25.12%	0/10 stars	2
4	18 November	Jungle Ghost Train	Brian; George; Jorgie; Kieron; Yvette	—N/a	3/5 stars	None
5	18 November	Scare Fair	Chris; Duncan; Lady C Susannah; Tony	—N/a	3/5 stars	None
6	19 November	Dicing With Danger	Ferne; Spencer; Vicky	—N/a	Ferne	3
7	20 November	Every Critter Counts	Brian; Jorgie; Lady C	—N/a	Lady C	4
8 (Live)	20 November	Cocktails and Screams	Brian; Chris; Duncan; Ferne; George; Jorgie; Kieron; Lady C Susannah; Tony; Vicky; Yvette	—N/a	Chris; Duncan; Ferne; Kieron; Lady C Tony; Vicky	None
9	21 November	The Trailer of Torment	Brian; George; Jorgie; Susannah; Yvette	—N/a	5/5 stars	None
10	22 November	Horri-flying Circus	Ferne; Vicky	24.33% 20.46%	6/12 stars	5
11	23 November	Helmets of Hell	Lady C	31.02%	9/12 stars	None
12	24 November	Floods of Fear	Ferne	18.93%	10/12 stars	6
13	25 November	The Critter Shop of Horrors	Brian	37.53%	12/12 stars	None
14	26 November	Scarier 51	Lady C	28.11%	0/12 stars	2
15	27 November	Steps to Hell	Kieron; Tony; Vicky	—N/a	Kieron	None
16	28 November	Saturday Fright at the Movies	George	—N/a	10/11 stars	None
17	29 November	Depths of Despair	Duncan; Tony	—N/a	9/11 stars	None
18	30 November	Scarier 52	Kieron	—N/a	9/10 stars	7
19	1 December	Badvent Calendar	Vicky	—N/a	9/9 stars	None
20	2 December	Panic Pit Part 2	Ferne	—N/a	8/8 stars	7
21	3 December	Horrible Heist	Jorgie; Kieron	—N/a	3/7 stars	None
22	4 December	Twisted Tombola	Kieron; Vicky	—N/a	5/6 stars	8
23	5 December	Celebrity Cyclone	Ferne; George; Jorgie; Kieron; Vicky	—N/a	5/5 stars	None
24	6 December	Surf and Turf	Vicky	—N/a	4/4 stars	None
25	6 December	Bushtucker Bonanza	Ferne	—N/a	4/4 stars	None
26	6 December	Critter Attack	George	—N/a	4/4 stars	None

=== Notes ===
^1 The celebrities were split up into two teams, Red (George, Jorgie, Kieron, Lady C and Tony) and Yellow (Brian, Chris, Duncan, Susannah and Yvette), with Tony and Susannah picking the teams as captains. The teams then faced a series of challenges, which the yellow team won 2–1, therefore moving straight into 'Croc Creek', while the red team automatically faced the first bushtucker trial. Chris, ejected after the yellow team's challenge loss, joined them for the trial. The losing team also were up for the 2nd and 3rd Bushtucker Trials.
^2 Lady C refused to take part in this bushtucker trial.
^3 This was a head-to-head trial. Since Ferne won, she was allowed to immediately enter the camp; she chose Vicky to join her, meaning Spencer was forced to return to Snake Rock.
^4 This was a head-to-head trial. Since Lady C won, she was allowed to return to Croc Creek, choosing George to take her place in Snake Rock.
^5 Chris, Lady C and Tony were excluded from the trial on medical grounds.
^6 Brian and Lady C were excluded from the trial on medical grounds.
^7 This trial was previously meant for Lady C, however she refused to take part.
^8 Tony was excluded from this trial on medical grounds.

Public Votes

Indicates that the celebrity was immune from the vote due to medical reasons
Indicates that the celebrity received the most votes from the public
Indicates that the celebrity was named as being in the bottom two and took part in the trial
Indicates that the celebrity was named as being in the bottom two
Indicates that the celebrity received the second fewest votes and was not named in the bottom two
Indicates that the celebrity had not yet entered the show
Indicates that the celebrity had withdrawn from the show

Daily results per celebrity
	Trial 2	Trial 3	Trial 10	Trial 11	Trial 12	Trial 13	Trial 14
Brian	3rd 16.15%	2nd 12.93%	6th 7.70%	7th 6.25%	Immune	1st 37.53%	2nd 11.62%
Chris	7th 7.05%	6th 7.66%	Immune	4th 9.42%	3rd 12.68%	4th 7.70%	2nd 11.62%
Duncan	8th 6.17%	7th 7.32%	3rd 12.77%	3rd 10.58%	4th 10.47%	7th 5.38%	4th 8.42%
Ferne	Not Entered		1st 24.33%	2nd 11.45%	1st 18.93%	11th 3.37%	11th 2.96%
George	5th 7.90%	3rd 11.37%	4th 9.64%	9th 4.55%	7th 9.03%	5th 5.66%	8th 5.67%
Jorgie	2nd 16.30%	9th 5.18%	7th 6.10%	10th 3.17%	8th 5.51%	9th 4.16%	10th 3.19%
Kieron	10th 2.97%	10th 4.07%	5th 9.16%	8th 5.26%	6th 9.56%	8th 5.18%	5th 8.38%
Lady C	1st 21.52%	1st 25.21%	Immune	1st 31.02%	Immune	2nd 11.44%	1st 28.11%
Spencer	Not Entered		Withdrawn				
Susannah	6th 7.15%	5th 8.68%	8th 5.81%	12th 2.37%	9th 5.07%	12th 2.70%	12th 2.53%
Tony	9th 4.84%	8th 6.78%	Immune	5th 6.96%	5th 10.44%	6th 5.51%	3rd 10.95%
Vicky	Not Entered		2nd 20.46%	6th 6.31%	2nd 13.66%	10th 3.54%	7th 6.04%
Yvette	4th 9.93%	4th 10.90%	9th 4.03%	11th 2.65%	10th 4.66%	3rd 7.83%	9th 4.08%
Notes	None						1
Bottom two (named in)	Jorgie, Lady C	Brian, Lady C	Ferne, Vicky	Ferne, Lady C	Chris, Ferne	Brian, Ferne	Brian, Lady C, Tony
Chosen	Lady C 21.52% voted for	Lady C 25.12% voted for	Ferne; 24.33% voted for	Lady C 31.02% voted for	Ferne; 18.93% voted for	Brian; 37.53% voted for	Lady C 28.11% voted for
Chosen	Jorgie; 16.30% voted for	Lady C 25.12% voted for	Vicky; 20.46% voted for	Lady C 31.02% voted for	Ferne; 18.93% voted for	Brian; 37.53% voted for	Lady C 28.11% voted for

=== Notes ===
- ^Note 1: There was a bottom 3 for this trial

== Star count ==
Celebrity	Number of stars earned	Percentage
Brian Friedman	20/22 stars	91%
Chris Eubank	13/15 stars	87%
Duncan Bannatyne	12/16 stars	75%
Ferne McCann	33/41 stars	80%
George Shelley	37/40 stars	93%
Jorgie Porter	36/42 stars	86%
Kieron Dyer	35/43 stars	81%
Lady Colin Campbell	32/59 stars	54%
Susannah Constantine	8/10 stars	80%
Spencer Matthews	—N/a	—N/a
Tony Hadley	22/26 stars	85%
Vicky Pattison	29/36 stars	81%
Yvette Fielding	8/10 stars	80%

== Dingo Dollar challenges ==
Members from camp will take part in the challenge to win 'Dingo Dollars'. If they win them then they can then take the dollars to the 'Outback Shack', where they can exchange them for camp luxuries with Kiosk Keith. Two options are given and the celebrities can choose which they would like to win. However, to win their luxury, a question is asked to the celebrities still in camp via the telephone box. If the question is answered correctly, the celebrities can take the items back to camp. If wrong, they receive nothing and Kiosk Keith will close the shack.

The celebrities got the question correct
The celebrities got the question wrong

Episode	Air date	Celebrities	Prizes available	Prize chosen	Notes
6	21 November	Tony; Vicky	Mixed nuts 6 doughnuts	6 doughnuts	None
7	22 November	Brian; Kieron	Bar of milk chocolate Crisps	Bar of milk chocolate	None
14	29 November	Ferne; Jorgie	Bread, butter and jam Cheese and crackers	Bread, butter and jam	1
15	30 November	Chris; Vicky	Chocolate chip cookies Chocolate brownies	Chocolate chip cookies	None
16	1 December	Duncan; Jorgie	Twiglets; Marshmallows	Marshmallows	None
17	2 December	George; Vicky	Chocolate cake Chips and tomato sauce	Chocolate cake	None
18	3 December	Duncan; Tony	Crumpets, butter and jam Meat & veg pasties	Meat & veg pasties	None
19	4 December	Jorgie; Tony	Pick 'n' Mix; Corn chips and salsa	Pick 'n' Mix	None

=== Notes ===
^1 A storm hit the jungle during the challenge and the celebrities were evacuated to the Bush Telegraph, so Ferne and Jorgie were unable to complete the challenge. However, they were given the Dollars and went to the Outback Shack to spend them once the storm had passed.

== Jungle Vending Machine ==
This year was the first ever time that a jungle vending machine was introduced. It was also the final time, as it has not returned since (2016–present). It was introduced in the 2nd episode, which Lady C and Yvette took part in. Lady C refused to take part, but Yvette was still allowed to. Due to her success in spelling out the correct word, which was later confirmed as 'Kangaroo', the celebrities received a key to unlock a door, which revealed a vending machine.

Records of Vending Machine Uses
Celebrity	Episode	Date	Item Chosen	
Tony	Series 15, Episode 2	16-11-2015	Hammocks	Majority
Lady C			Can of Soup	Non-Majority

== Ratings ==
Official ratings are taken from BARB.

Episode	Airdate	Official ITV rating (millions)	ITV weekly rank	Official ITV HD rating (millions)	Official ITV +1 rating (millions)	Total ITV viewers (millions)	Overnight share
1	15 November	8.29	1	2.64	0.39	11.32	42.8%
2	16 November	7.52	2	2.42	0.62	10.56	34.6%
3	18 November	7.05	5	2.18	0.52	9.75	33.3%
4	19 November	7.12	4	2.28	0.54	9.94	35.4%
5	20 November	6.77	6	2.04	0.48	9.29	30.8%
6	21 November	7.29	3	1.99	0.36	9.64	34.6%
7	22 November	7.74	1	2.33	0.43	10.50	36.9%
8	23 November	7.60	2	2.07	0.51	10.18	
9	24 November	6.79	7	2.13	0.48	9.40	32.0%
10	25 November	6.61	9	2.00	0.82	9.43	30.2%
11	26 November	7.06	4	2.26	0.52	9.84	35.2%
12	27 November	6.78	8	2.13	0.47	9.38	33.8%
13	28 November	7.18	3	2.08	0.49	9.75	35.6%
14	29 November	7.61	1	2.36	0.33	10.30	38.5%
15	30 November	7.23	3	2.29	0.41	9.93	
16	1 December	6.45	9	1.96	0.47	8.88	30.1%
17	2 December	7.25	2	2.23	0.45	9.93	33.0%
18	3 December	6.79	7	2.20	0.41	9.40	33.7%
19	4 December	7.00	5	1.94	0.39	9.33	
20	5 December	6.87	6	2.12	0.42	9.41	32.8%
21	6 December	8.12	1	2.49	0.33	10.94	40.6%
Series average	2015	7.20	—N/a	—N/a	0.47	9.86	—N/a
Coming Out	9 December	5.57	7				26.8%
