= Lilah Parsons =

English broadcast journalist (born 1988)

- Born: Lilah Veronica Parsons; 18 February 1988 (age 38); Hammersmith, London, England
- Occupations: Broadcast journalist; model; TV presenter; radio presenter

Lilah Veronica Parsons (born 18 February 1988) is an English broadcast journalist. She was formerly a model, as well as formerly being a TV and radio presenter. She is best known for previously being a presenter on MTV, co-presenting Capital Breakfast with Dave Berry and George Shelley, hosting a solo radio show on Heart, and her current job role of being a broadcast journalist for BBC News.

== Career ==
Parsons was scouted as a model at a party at the age of 20. She modelled for brands such as Chanel, Make Jewellery Magazine, Peacocks, Harper’s Bazaar, Vivienne Westwood, and Swatch before getting a job at MTV and moving into presenting.

She is represented by Select Model London.

=== Media ===
Parsons hosted several shows at MTV UK, such as MTV Essentials, MTV Asks and This Week’s MTV Top 20, as well as MTV's coverage of Snowbombing Festival in Austria in 2013 and 2014; some of these programmes also aired elsewhere on MTV Live HD. Parsons also hosted a weekly programme on Fridays and co-hosted Hoxton Fashion Show on Shoreditch web radio station, Hoxton Radio, in 2014 and 2015.

In February 2016, along with George Shelley, Parsons was confirmed as a new co-presenter of Capital Breakfast, joining Dave Berry and replacing Lisa Snowdon, who left the show at the end of 2015. In early 2016, she hosted the Brits Red Carpet live show alongside George Shelley. The duo also hosted the Brit Awards Red Carpet in 2017, interviewing Ed Sheeran, Katy Perry, Little Mix, Dua Lipa and more.

In December 2017, Parsons began to cover radio shows on Heart Radio, a sister network of Capital (both are owned and operated by Global). On 9 January 2018, it was announced that she would be hosting her own late show Friday to Sunday nights from 10pm, Heart's Feel Good Weekend. The first episode aired four days later. Parsons stepped down from Sunday nights in July 2018.

Parsons left Heart in December 2021 and was replaced by Rezzy Ghadjar.

Parsons co-hosted the first season (2017–2018) of PopBuzz Presents, a weekly entertainment show from PopBuzz (now Capital Buzz) that was live-streamed on Twitter with guests such as Meghan Trainor, Craig David, Louis Tomlinson and P!nk with Will Hardy.

Since May 2024, Parsons has switched to working in journalism and has since been a broadcast journalist for BBC News after studying and completing a Master of Arts degree at City, University of London in Television Journalism. At BBC News, she mainly focuses on coverage for BBC News Streaming, which goes out on the BBC News app, the BBC News website, and BBC iPlayer.

== Personal life ==
Parsons is the daughter of Sir John Christopher Parsons, KCVO and The Hon. Lady Parsons (formerly The Hon. Anne Constance Manningham-Buller). Her maternal grandfather was Reginald Manningham-Buller, 1st Viscount Dilhorne, and is the niece of Eliza Manningham-Buller. She attended Oundle School in Northamptonshire and briefly studied French at the University of Exeter.

Parsons also studied fashion at City and Guilds of London Art School, before getting scouted as a model at a party.

Between September 2023 and June 2024, Parsons studied for a Master of Arts degree for Television Journalism at City, University of London, leading her to her career at BBC News.
