= Only the Young (band) =

British mixed pop group

- Origin: London, United Kingdom
- Genre: Pop
- Years active: 2012–2015
- Label: The Qworkz
- Past members: Parisa Tarjomani; Charlie George; Betsy-Blue English; Mikey Bromley; George Shelley
- Website: otyofficial.com

Only the Young were a British pop group consisting of Mikey Bromley, Betsy-Blue English, Charlie George and Parisa Tarjomani. They were created and managed by Jo Perry. The group previously featured George Shelley, who auditioned for the ninth series of The X Factor as a soloist, was later added to Union J who made the live shows and were the tenth contestant eliminated in the semi-final. This was when Shelley was later replaced by Bromley. In 2014, Only the Young entered the eleventh series of The X Factor and made the live shows, where they were the tenth contestant eliminated.

On 6 November 2015, Tajormani announced her departure from the group via her blog. Only the Young then announced their disbandment later that month.

== Career ==
=== Early career ===
Parisa Tarjomani and Charlie George had known each other since they were children, Only the Young cast Betsy-Blue English to the band and George Shelley in 2012. Shelley went on to audition for the ninth series of The X Factor UK that same year. He auditioned as a solo artist but was later added to Union J who made the live shows finishing in fourth place in the semi-final. After Shelley's departure, he was later replaced by Mikey Bromley. Before auditioning for The X Factor, Only the Young auditioned for Capital's Summertime Ball on 21 June 2014, and were chosen to perform at Wembley Stadium alongside Pharrell Williams, Miley Cyrus, David Guetta, Enrique Iglesias, Little Mix and many other artists.

=== 2014: The X Factor ===
Only The Young auditioned for eleventh series of The X Factor. While on the series, Only the Young released their version of Bobby "Boris" Pickett's "Monster Mash" in aid of Teenage Cancer Trust. Only The Young made the live shows and were mentored by Louis Walsh. Additionally Walsh mentored Union J when Shelley was on the show in 2012. They were in the bottom two with Jake Quickenden in week three, but they were saved after receiving only Mel B's vote against them. They were automatically eliminated in week seven as the contestant with the fewest public votes on Saturday, been the tenth contestant sent home. Two weeks after being voted off the show, the group announced their first headlining show which would be held in London's Under the Bridge on 28 December 2014, thus becoming the first act of the series to be successful after leaving the show. However, the group had to pull out of the event following the death of Tarjomani's mother on 21 December.

The X Factor performances and results
Stage	Song	Theme	Result
Room audition	"Something About the Way You Look Tonight"	Free choice	Through to arena
Arena audition	"We Can't Stop"	Free choice	Through to bootcamp
Six-chair challenge (bootcamp)	"9 to 5"	Free choice	Through to judges' houses
Judges' houses	"Ghost"	Free choice	Through to live shows
Live week 1	"Twist n' Shout" / "Jailhouse Rock"	Number ones	Safe (13th)
Live week 2	"Come on Eileen"	80's Night	Safe (9th)
Live week 3	"Boom Clap"	Saturday night at the movies	Bottom two (11th)
Live week 3	"The Winner Takes It All"	Free choice	Safe (3/4 majority vote)
Live week 4	"Monster Mash"	Fright Night (Halloween)	Safe (7th)
Live week 5	"Blame It on the Boogie"	Michael Jackson vs. Queen	Safe (7th)
Live week 6	"I Wanna Be Like You"	Big band	Safe (6th)
Live week 7	"Something About the Way You Look Tonight"	Whitney Houston vs. Elton John	Eliminated (seventh place)

=== 2015: "I Do" and split ===
On 30 April 2015, they were guests at the 10th Young Scot Awards. On 19 May 2015, they announced that they had signed a deal with Warner Music, with their debut single to be released during summer 2015. The music video of their debut single "I Do" was released on 8 June 2015, but their YouTube account was hacked four days later, which led to its deletion. It was re-uploaded the next day (13 June), losing all its previous views. "I Do" was originally to be released on 31 July, but due to the migrant crisis in Calais preventing a lorry containing copies of their single coming into the UK, it had to be delayed by a week, instead being released on 7 August. "I Do" debuted at number 53 on the UK Singles Chart on 14 August, but was the most physically purchased song of the week. The single also hit Number 41 in the Irish Single Charts On 18 August, the band announced their first headlining UK tour, which started on 1 September.

On 6 November 2015, Tarjormani announced her departure from the band via her blog. Only The Young then announced their split in November 2015.

=== 2017: First and final album ===
On 4 October 2017 the group released their self-titled debut album, featuring songs they originally planned to release, to please their fanbase.

== Discography ==
Studio album
Title	Details
Only the Young	Released: 4 September 2017; Label: THE QWORKZ; Format: Digital download

Singles
Title	Year	Peak chart positions		Album
Title	Year	UK	IRE	Album
"I Do"	2015	53	41	Non-album single
"The Monster Mash"	2015	—	—	Only the Young
"—" denotes a recording that did not chart or was not released in that territory.
