= Jake Quickenden =

English singer, footballer

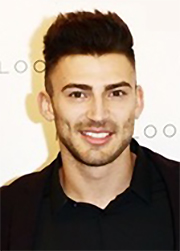
- Quickenden in 2014
- Born: Jacob Quickenden; 3 September 1988 (age 38); Scunthorpe, North Lincolnshire, England
- Occupations: Singer, television personality, footballer, influencer
- Years active: 2012–present
- Television: The X Factor (2012, 2014); I'm a Celebrity...Get Me Out of Here! (2014); Dancing on Ice (2018); Hollyoaks (2019); Ninja Warrior UK (2019); The Real Full Monty On Ice (2020); Celebrity SAS: Who Dares Wins (2021)
- Spouse: Sophie Church (m. 2022; sep. 2026)
- Partner: Danielle Fogarty (2014-2018)
- Children: 2

Jacob Quickenden (born 3 September 1988) is an English singer, ex-footballer and reality television personality. He was a contestant on the ninth series of The X Factor, being eliminated at the Judges' houses, and the eleventh series in 2014, being the fifth contestant eliminated. Later in 2014, he was the runner-up in series 14 of I'm a Celebrity...Get Me Out of Here!.

== Football career ==
Jake Quickenden
Personal information
- Full name: Jacob Quickenden
- Date of birth: 3 September 1988 (age 38)
- Place of birth: Scunthorpe, North Lincolnshire, England
- Position: Forward

Youth career
- Scunthorpe United

Senior career*
Years	Team	Apps	(Gls)
	Sunshine George Cross		(30)
2012–2013	Frickley Athletic	128	(65)
2013–2015	Bottesford Town	466	(534)
2017–2018	Ossett Town		
- * Club domestic league appearances and goals

Quickenden played football, mainly as a winger or forward. He began his football career as a youth player for Scunthorpe United but suffered a broken leg, ending his chances with his hometown club. Following recovery he was offered trials in Australia with Bentleigh Greens and Sunshine George Cross, eventually playing professionally in Australia for two years. He then returned to England and went on to play for Frickley Athletic in the Evo-Stik Northern Premier League, Premier Division. Most recently he played for Lincolnshire club Bottesford Town in the Northern Counties East Football League. In 2015, he was rumoured to have been offered the opportunity to play for Gainsborough Trinity, but denied it. He joined Ossett Town in 2017.

== Media career ==
Quickenden began his media career by appearing on the talent show The X Factor. After his 2012 departure, he has made a number of other media appearances since, including working as a presenter on the Chart Show TV channel.

His current work includes advertising products on social media as an influencer. Between May and July 2022 the Advertising Standards Agency reprimanded Quickenden for failing to disclose commercial relationships with advertisers on his channels, including his Instagram account.

=== The X Factor ===
In 2012, Quickenden auditioned for the ninth series of The X Factor, where he sang "Use Somebody" and received four yesses from the judges. At bootcamp, along with fellow contestants Adam Burridge and Robbie Hance, he sang "How to Save a Life". The judges decided to put him through to judges' houses where he was in the Boys category along with Burridge, Nathan Fagan-Gayle, Rylan Clark, Jahméne Douglas, and the series' eventual winner James Arthur and their mentor was Nicole Scherzinger. Quickenden sang "Back for Good" in front of Scherzinger and her guest, Ne-Yo. The next day, Scherzinger decided not to put Quickenden through to the live shows, choosing Clark, Douglas, and Arthur instead.

The X Factor performances and results (2012)
Episode	Theme	Song	Result
First audition	Free choice	"Use Somebody"	Through to bootcamp
Bootcamp – Stage 1	Free choice	"How to Save a Life" with Adam Burridge and Robbie Hance	Through to stage 2
Bootcamp – Stage 2	Free choice	Unknown	Through to judges' houses
Judges' houses	Free choice	"Back for Good"	Eliminated

In 2014, Quickenden once again auditioned for the eleventh series of The X Factor, where he sang "All of Me", but was stopped and asked to perform his second song, "Say Something". Quickenden received positive comments from the judges for his second song and gave him four yeses to proceed to the next round. In the arena audition, he performed "Who You Are" by Jessie J. Quickenden received good comments from the judges. Head judge Simon Cowell commented that he was not a big fan of previous contestants returning since there was usually a reason for them being sent home, but said that he was not judging in the 2012 series and that Quickenden should not have been eliminated. The judges decided to put Quickenden through to bootcamp. He was again in the "Boys" category with Mel B as his mentor. In the six-chair challenge of bootcamp, Quickenden sang "A Thousand Years" and his mentor gave him a chair and proceeded to the next round. At judges' houses, he sang "Every Little Thing She Does Is Magic" and was put through to the live shows along with Andrea Faustini and Paul Akister.

On 27 October, Quickenden landed in the bottom two in week 3 against Only the Young and was eliminated, with only his mentor Mel B voting to save him.

The X Factor performances and results (2014)
Episode	Theme	Song	Result
Room Audition	Free choice	"All of Me" / "Say Something"	Through to bootcamp
Arena Audition	Free choice	"Who You Are"	Through to stage 2
Bootcamp – Six Chair Challenge	Free choice	"A Thousand Years"	Through to judges' houses
Judges Houses	Free choice	"Every Little Thing She Does Is Magic"	Through to live shows
Live Show 1	Number ones	"She's the One"	Safe (8th)
Live Show 2	1980s music	"Total Eclipse of the Heart"	Safe (11th)
Live Show 3	Songs from films	"She's Like the Wind"	Bottom two (12th)
Live Show 3	Final showdown	"Red"	Eliminated

=== I'm a Celebrity...Get Me Out of Here! ===
Beginning on 20 November 2014, Quickenden took part in 14th series of I'm a Celebrity...Get Me Out of Here!, entering the jungle on Day 5 of the competition with former politician Edwina Currie. Jake finished the show as runner-up to World Superbike racer Carl 'Foggy' Fogarty.

=== Dancing on Ice ===
Quickenden was a contestant in the 10th series of Dancing on Ice, where he was partnered with professional German figure skater Vanessa Bauer. On 11 March 2018, he and Bauer won the competition over Brooke Vincent and Max Evans.

== Filmography ==
Year	Title	Role	Notes
2012, 2014	The X Factor	Himself	Contestant
2014	I'm a Celebrity...Get Me Out of Here!	Himself	Contestant
2015	Dish Up: An Easier Way to Cook	Himself	Guest, 4 episodes
2018	Dancing on Ice	Himself	Contestant
2019	Ninja Warrior UK	Himself	Contestant
2019	Hollyoaks	Woody	Guest, 3 episodes
2020	The Real Full Monty on Ice	Himself	Contestant
2021	Celebrity SAS: Who Dares Wins	Himself	Contestant
2022	Celebrity Help! My House Is Haunted	Himself	Homeowner

=== Theatre ===
Year	Show
2018	Dreamboys
2019	Hair: The Musical
2022	Footloose: The Musical
2023-2024	The Full Monty

== Discography ==
=== Extended plays ===
List of EPs
Title	Details
I Want You	Released: 9 August 2015; Label: Independent; Format: Digital download
New Chapter	Released: 1 April 2016; Label: Independent; Format: Digital download

=== Singles ===
List of singles, with selected chart positions
Title	Year	Peak chart position	Album
Title	Year	UK Indie Breakers	Album
"I Want You"	2015	10	I Want You EP
"Blindfold"	2016	—	New Chapter
"Can't Stand the Rain"	2016	—	New Chapter
"Feel My Love"	2016	—	Non-album singles
"Get Away with Me" (featuring Bailey McConnell)	2016	—	Non-album singles
"Black Mirror"	2017	—	Non-album singles
"Ineffable"	2017	—	Non-album singles
"When You Kissed Him"	2018	—	Non-album singles
"Afraid to Be Lonely"	2019	—	Non-album singles
"Tearing Me Apart"	2019	—	Non-album singles
"Quarantine Song"	2020	8	Non-album singles
"Where I'll Wait"	2020	—	Non-album singles
"Drunk on You"	2020	—	Non-album singles
"Have Yourself a Merry Little Christmas" (live charity single)	2020	—	Non-album singles
"When I'm Gone"	2021	7	Non-album singles
"Love Don't Feel the Same"	2021	—	Non-album singles

== See also ==
- List of Dancing on Ice contestants
- List of I'm a Celebrity...Get Me Out of Here! (British TV series) contestants
- List of The X Factor (British TV series) finalists
