= Vicky Pattison =

British television personality (born 1987)

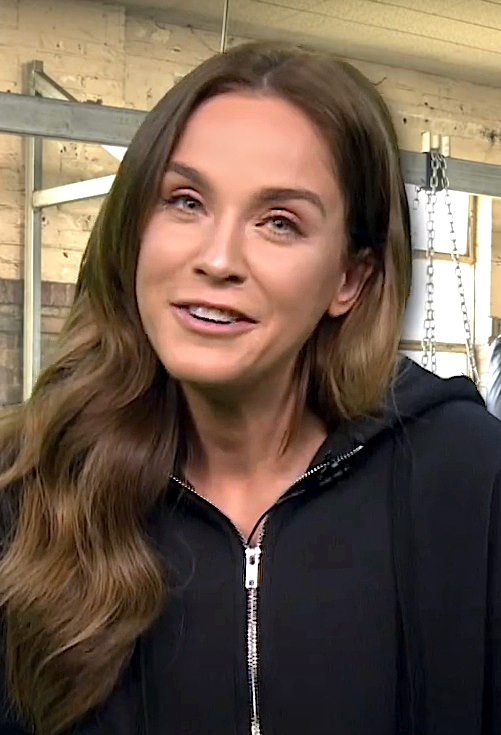
- Pattison in 2018
- Born: 16 November 1987 (age 38); Newcastle upon Tyne, England
- Education: Burnside Business and Enterprise College; Liverpool John Moores University
- Occupations: Television and media personality; author; radio presenter
- Years active: 2011–present
- Spouse: Ercan Ramadan (m. 2024)

Victoria Pattison-Ramadan (born 16 November 1987) is a British television personality, media personality, radio presenter and author. She is best known for appearing in the MTV shows Geordie Shore from 2011 until 2014, Ex on the Beach in 2014 and 2015 and her own show, Judge Geordie, in 2015.

Pattison won the fifteenth series of I'm a Celebrity...Get Me Out of Here! in December 2015 and became a permanent member on the panel of the ITV daytime chat show Loose Women in January 2016. She was also a team captain on the Channel 5 panel show It's Not Me, It's You and co-presented I'm a Celebrity: Extra Camp in 2016. She was partnered with Kai Widdrington in the twenty-third series of Strictly Come Dancing (2025).

== Early life ==
Before Geordie Shore, Pattison enjoyed drama in school. She had various jobs, including working on the door of some of Newcastle's nightclubs and in telesales. She has a degree in drama from Liverpool John Moores University.

== Media career ==
=== Geordie Shore ===
Pattison appeared in the MTV show Geordie Shore from 2011 to 2014 in the first series of the show. She had a short relationship with the fellow co-star Jay Gardner, which ended following an incident during the first series finale in which she spat in his face. After her appearance on the show, she was featured on the front cover of Loaded magazine in October 2011 with The Only Way Is Essex star Jess Wright and the Made in Chelsea star Binky Felstead. She also appeared in Nuts magazine with another Geordie Shore star, Holly Hagan. In the second series of the show, Pattison began a turbulent on/off relationship with a new cast member, Ricci Guarnaccio. She and a former cast member, Rebecca Walker, were shown not to get on with each other, leading to constant conflict in the Geordie Shore house. Her catchphrase "tash on" became a new entry in the online Collins Dictionary. Her peculiar speech style became the object of much public attention: the use of words like "ostentatious" and "euphoric" "in a Geordie Shore context of expletives" was described "as a 'stretch', a way of testing expressive limits, that is a form of catachresis". Pattison was in Cancun, Mexico, during the third series where, during filming, Guarnaccio proposed to her.

In the fifth series, Pattison calls off her engagement with Guarnaccio and ultimately ends the relationship. Guarnaccio later decided to leave the show following the break-up. In December 2013, she released her own fitness DVD entitled Vicky's 7 Day Slim. Before the beginning of the ninth series, she announced that it would be her last, making her final appearance during the series's finale.

Get A Grip Love

Pattison co-hosts a regular podcast, Get A Grip with Irish broadcaster Angela Scanlon, in which they discuss topical issues.

Legal issues

In July 2013, during filming for the seventh series of Geordie Shore, Pattison was arrested after throwing a high-heeled shoe at another club goer whom she incorrectly believed had thrown ice at her, and injuring a member of the venue's security staff who had intervened. She later pleaded guilty to two counts of assault and was sentenced to 180 hours of unpaid community service and ordered to pay compensation to the two victims.

== Personal life ==
In 2023, Pattison spoke about her experience of oocyte cryopreservation, and said she would donate any eggs she did not use.

Pattison married Ercan Ramadan, the owner of a clothing brand, at Marylebone Town Hall in August 2024. A second ceremony took place in Italy in September. The wedding was the subject of the E4 programme Vicky Pattison: My Big Fat Geordie Wedding.

Pattison wrote the book The Secret to Happy talking about her struggles with body image and childhood trauma.

== Television career ==
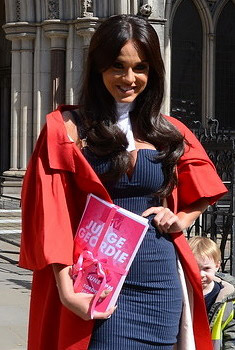
Pattison attending a photocall for MTV show Judge Geordie on May 13, 2015

In 2014 and 2015, Pattison starred in the MTV reality television show Ex on the Beach. She has appeared and made guest appearances on Big Brother's Bit on the Side, This Morning, Safeword, Murder in Successville, TV's 50 Greatest Magic Tricks, Most Shocking Celebrity Moments 2011, Virtually Famous, Ant and Dec's Saturday Night Takeaway, Celebrity Juice live special and Through the Keyhole.

Starting from June 2015, Pattison presented and starred in her own MTV show, in which she tries to sort out feuds and problems between families, friends and relationships in Judge Geordie.

Since mid-2015, Pattison has had her name on a weekly column in the magazine new!. She released her autobiography, entitled Nothing But The Truth, in August 2014 and updated it in March 2016. She signed a deal to write two novels which were published in July (All That Glitters) and October 2015 (A Christmas Kiss).

On 2 July 2015, Pattison appeared on BBC Radio 1's Innuendo Bingo. In 2015, Despite struggling to cope with the smell of the jungle, she went on to win fifteenth series of I'm a Celebrity...Get Me Out of Here!.

Pattison was appearing as a regular panellist on ITV's lunchtime discussion show Loose Women from January 2016. In January, she also speaking about her time on the show, appeared in a special two-part Geordie Shore.

In June 2016, she became a team captain on the Channel 5 panel show It's Not Me, It's You, hosted by Eamonn Holmes. Also starting from September 2016, she has regularly appeared in a new segment on This Morning with Ferne McCann where they go on a road trip together. In September 2016, it was announced that she would co-present I'm a Celebrity...Get Me Out of Here! NOW! from November 2016 with Joe Swash, replacing Laura Whitmore, but it was also later announced that the show would be retitled as I'm a Celebrity: Extra Camp and that Chris Ramsey and Stacey Solomon would be presenting with Pattison and Swash. In April 2017, Pattison announced that she would not be returning to present I'm a Celebrity: Extra Camp.

On 12 February 2018 (day 17 of the series), Pattison became a contestant on the fourth season of the Australian version of I'm a Celebrity...Get Me Out of Here!. On 11 March 2018 (day 44), she was evicted after spending 28 days in the jungle, finishing in fourth place. On 16 October 2018, Pattison partnered with Dom Joly in a show that saw them going "on the run" as "fugitives" in Channel 4's Celebrity Hunted.

In 2023, Pattison appeared in the fifth series of the BBC show in which celebrities from different faiths walk together on an historical pilgrimage. It was filmed in Portugal, where the group followed the northern route of the Fatima Way in Pilgrimage. In August 2024, she presented the E4 television programme Second-Hand Showdown.

In January 2025, it was announced that Pattison would appear in a documentary called Vicky Pattison: My Deepfake Sex Tape. The programme, in which Pattison released her own AI-generated deepfake porn video, was criticised by campaigners and abuse survivors' groups as "insulting", "pointless" and "gross".

In August 2025, Pattison was announced as a contestant on the upcoming twenty-third series of Strictly Come Dancing. Her partner in the series was Kai Widdrington. She was eliminated from the competition on 16 November 2025.

== Radio career ==
On 16 August 2023, it was confirmed that Pattison would join Heart North East to present the weekday drivetime show with Adam Lawrance.

Since 1 March 2025, Pattison has presented Saturday afternoons on the Heart network, replacing Mark Wright.

== Filmography ==
=== Television ===
Year	Title	Role	Notes
2011–2014	Geordie Shore	Herself	Series 1–9 - Main cast
2013, 2015	Big Brother's Bit on the Side	Herself	Guest, 2 episodes
2014, 2015	Ex on the Beach	Herself	Series 1 - Main cast; 8 episodes, Series 3 - Ex; 3 episodes
2015	Celebrity Dinner Date	Herself	1 episode
2015	Judge Geordie	Herself	Presenter, 10 episodes
2015	I'm a Celebrity...Get Me Out of Here! (UK)	Herself	Series 15 - Contestant; winner
2015–2019, 2022	Loose Women	Herself	Regular panellist (2015–2019), Guest panellist (2022)
2016	Geordie Shore: Their Journey	Herself	Discussing the history of Geordie Shore
2016	It's Not Me, It's You	Herself	Team captain; 7 episodes
2016	World of Weird	Herself	Co-presenter
2016	Strip Date	Herself	Narrator / voice-over
2016	I'm a Celebrity: Extra Camp	Herself	Co-presenter; 20 episodes
2016	Murder in Successville	Herself	Series 2 - Guest sidekick; Episode: "Vigilante"
2016	Drunk History: UK	Disgusted Lady / Wellington's Mistress	Series 2; 2 episodes: "Richard III / Mary Shelly's Frankenstein" and "Battle of Waterloo / Arthur Conan Doyle"
2016–2017	Virtually Famous	Herself	Panellist / Team captain; 8 episodes
2016–2017	Celebrity Juice	Herself	Panellist; 8 episodes
2016, 2018–2020, 2022-present	This Morning	Herself	Road trip segment along with Ferne McCann (2016), Showbiz reporter (2018–2020, 2022-present)
2017	Who Shot Simon Cowell?	Herself	TV film; Party guest
2018	Ex on the Beach: Body SOS	Herself	Presenter; 8 episodes
2018	Say Yes to the Dress: UK	Herself	Participant
2018	I'm a Celebrity...Get Me Out of Here! (Aus)	Herself	Season 4 - Contestant; fourth place
2018	Celebrity Hunted	Herself	Series 2 - Contestant, paired with Dom Joly; 5 episodes
2018	Impossible Celebrities	Herself	Contestant; series regular; 6 episodes
2019	Vicky Pattison: The Break Up	Herself	Documentary following Pattison's life
2019	Celebrity Coach Trip	Herself	Series 5
2019–2022	Celebrity Masterchef	Herself	Series 14 - Contestant; 3 episodes, Series 15–17 - Guest judge; 3 episodes
2020	Ant & Dec's Saturday Night Takeaway	Herself	Series 16 - Segment presenter
2021	Celebrity SAS: Who Dares Wins	Herself	Series 3 - Contestant; 3 episodes
2021	Buffering	Herself	Series 1; Episode: "Screen Test"
2022	Vicky Pattison: Alcohol, Dad and Me	Herself	Documentary
2023	Pilgrimage: The Road through Portugal	Herself	Participant; 3 episodes
2024	The Underdog: Josh Must Win	Herself	
2024	My Big Fat Geordie Wedding	Herself	Documentary following Pattison's wedding
2024	Second-Hand Showdown	Herself	Series 2 - Presenter
2025	The Honesty Box	Host	With Lucinda Light
2025	Strictly Come Dancing	Herself	Contestant; series 23
2026	The Great Stand Up to Cancer Bake Off	Herself	Contestant; series 9
2026	Vicky Pattison: Maybe, Baby?	Herself	Two-part documentary

Preceded by Carl Fogarty	I'm a Celebrity... Get Me Out of Here! Winner & Queen of the Jungle; 2015	Succeeded by Scarlett Moffatt
