= The Only Way Is Essex series 18 =

The Only Way Is Essex
- Season 18
- No. of episodes: 10

Release
- Original network: ITVBe
- Original release: 17 July – 17 August 2016

Series chronology
- ← Previous; Series 17 Next → Series 19

The eighteenth series of the British semi-reality television programme The Only Way Is Essex was confirmed on 3 June 2015 when it was announced that it had renewed for at least a further six series, taking it up to 21 series. It is the third series to be included in its current contract. The series launched on 17 July 2016 with a special entitled The Only Way is Mallorca. Ahead of the series, it was announced that cast member Jake Hall had quit the show, having appeared since the fourteenth series. Despite quitting the show at the end of the sixteenth series, Jess Wright made a one-off appearance to support Bobby Cole Norris over the loss of his dog. It was also the first series not to include long-running cast member Lewis Bloor, who quit during the previous series. New cast member Amber Dowding joined the show for this series. Love Island winners Nathan Massey and Cara De La Hoyde also made guest appearances during the ninth episode of the series. This was the final series to include Billie Faiers after it was announced she had quit the show.

== Cast ==
- Amber Dowding
- Billie Faiers
- Bobby Cole Norris
- Carol Wright
- Chloe Lewis
- Chloe Meadows
- Chloe Sims
- Chris Clark
- Courtney Green
- Dan Edgar
- Danni Armstrong
- Debbie Douglas
- Gemma Collins
- Georgia Kousoulou
- James "Arg" Argent
- James "Diags" Bennewith
- James "Lockie" Lock
- Jess Wright
- Jon Clark
- Kate Wright
- Liam Blackwell
- Lydia Bright
- Megan McKenna
- Mike Hassini
- Nikki Blackwell
- Pete Wicks
- Tommy Mallet
- Vas Morgan

== Episodes ==
No. overall	No. in series	Title	Original release date	Duration	UK viewers
210	1	"The Only Way Is Mallorca, Part 1"	17 July 2016	60 minutes	1,114,000
The group head to Mallorca, but Dan and Kate’s recent break-up is still fresh in mind when the pair come face-to-face again. After another split, Lydia tells Arg that they have to keep their distance from each other and become strangers, whilst Courtney and Chloe M go on a mission to get to know Pete for Megan’s sake. Elsewhere, the Chloe L and Megan feud continues, Kate and Dan get their old spark back, and Chloe M reveals she may like Mike. Bobby agrees to help find John a girlfriend, and after Chloe L reveals she’s seen Megan grinding on another boy, she prepares herself for a showdown.
211	2	"The Only Way Is Mallorca, Part 2"	20 July 2016	60 minutes	1,045,000
Pete decides he’s had enough of the drama so meets with Chloe L to tell her to drop her vendetta against Megan, but it only causes more trouble as when the girls come face-to-face an almighty argument erupts. Mike is stuck in the middle when Courtney and Chloe M both fight for his attention on a night out, and Lydia is forced to explain herself when rumours begin to surface. Elsewhere back in Essex the group celebrate Nelly’s second birthday, Chris introduces his new girlfriend Amber, and Tommy breaks some unwelcome news to Arg about Lydia’s Mallorca antics.
212	3	"Episode 3"	24 July 2016	50 minutes	1,110,000
Newly single Arg has a proposition for Dan regarding their living situations as he asks him to move in with him, but then seeks advice from Kate on how to lure him in. Mike involves himself in Megan and Pete’s troubles as he makes his opinions known about a photo of Megan that comes to light, but it only leaves Pete questioning his friend’s loyalty. Meanwhile Bobby mourns the loss of his dog as Gemma returns to support her best friend, and Dan and Tommy’s friendship hits the rocks. Elsewhere tempers flare in Sugar Hut as Megan and Pete declare war on Mike.
213	4	"Episode 4"	27 July 2016	50 minutes	1,004,000
Dan weighs up the pros and cons of living with Arg before finally making a decision, whilst the couples of Essex decide to show off their cooking skills to each other. The tension between Tommy and Dan increases as Georgia gets upset, but both men agree to bury the hatchet for the sake of others, but there’s no going back for Pete and Mike as they square up to each other once more. Megan is hurt to discover Chloe M and Courtney have gone behind her back to meet with Lydia and Chloe L, and Bobby announces his plans for his future career.
214	5	"Episode 5"	31 July 2016	50 minutes	1,037,000
Danni organises a fashion show to celebrate the second anniversary of her shop opening but it only leads to awkwardness as Megan and Chloe L both agree to walk down the catwalk. Mike finally makes an apology towards Megan, Liam and Debbie go on a mission to help find Nikki the man of her dreams, and Gemma does her best to remove Jim, a ghostly presence in Billie’s new house. Megan and Chloe M’s attempts to clear the air ends up with the pair screaming at each other, and Chris and Amber take their relationship to the next step.
215	6	"Episode 6"	3 August 2016	50 minutes	1,190,000
Kate becomes jealous when she hears rumours that Dan has been with girls, whilst Lockie and Danni reminisce in Southend. With Chloe M isolating herself from the girls to not rile Megan up further, Tommy advises her to be her own person and wash her hands of her old friend for good. Jess is back to give Bobby the support he needs, and Pete fails to understand Chloe M’s point of view after an awkward meeting. Elsewhere Debbie and Carol prepare Nikki for her first date in 20 years, and Lockie urges Pete to make amends with Mike.
216	7	"Episode 7"	7 August 2016	50 minutes	1,012,000
The Clark’s organise an Essex sports day where Gemma confides in Bobby over her secret crush on Jon; Mike and Pete finally clear the air, and Kate feels that the boys are rubbing it in that Dan is now single. Meanwhile Courtney fails to win over Megan for the sake of Chloe M; Georgia and Danni offer some advice to loved up Chris and Amber, and Carol shows off her hidden talents. Things turn heated as it’s revealed that Jon has tried it on with Kate recently, but when confronted by Dan, further truths come to light about his ex.
217	8	"Episode 8"	10 August 2016	50 minutes	1,031,000
Kate rages with Jon over starting rumours about her sleeping with somebody behind Dan’s back, but despite knowing he’s in the wrong, Chris is put in an awkward situation when he backs up his brother. Megan’s family offer her advice over her drift with Chloe M before the pair finally have a chat about their broken friendship, whilst Dan shoots Kate down as she tries to explain herself to him. Elsewhere Jon finds himself in another drama as Diags stands up for his friend, Lydia celebrates her sister’s birthday, and Tommy and Georgia discuss the future.
218	9	"Episode 9"	14 August 2016	50 minutes	988,000
Chris confides in his mum over Jon’s recent reckless behaviour, the group continue to take Kate’s side, and Chloe S gives Jon a piece of her mind for the way he handled the argument with Diags. Tommy and Georgia double date with ‘’Love Island’’ winners Cara and Nathan, whilst Liam celebrates his birthday in style. Debbie and Arg face an emotional reunion as they discuss their recent drift, and finally realising he’s in the wrong, Jon offers an olive branch to Kate and apologises to her. Meanwhile Megan and Chloe M begin to grow closer again.
219	10	"Episode 10"	17 August 2016	50 minutes	1,024,000
Bobby celebrates his 30th birthday in style with a huge circus themed party, but there’s still a clear atmosphere as Jon has different versions of events to tell Dan and Kate during his apologies. Chloe L and Megan finally agree to be civil to each other, and randy Gemma offers herself on a plate to Jon. Arg is put in an awkward situation when he comes face-to-face with Lydia again, Chloe M and Courtney feel a weight is lifted from their shoulders, and Dan begs Kate for the truth as the pair realise they can’t even just be friends.

== Reception ==
=== Ratings ===
Episode	Date	Official ITVBe rating	ITVBe weekly rank	ITVBe+1 viewers	Total ITVBe viewers
Mallorca 1	17 July 2016	1,078,000	1	36,000	1,114,000
Mallorca 2	20 July 2016	987,000	2	58,000	1,045,000
Episode 3	24 July 2016	1,065,000	1	45,000	1,110,000
Episode 4	27 July 2016	947,000	1	57,000	1,004,000
Episode 5	31 July 2016	941,000	2	96,000	1,037,000
Episode 6	3 August 2016	1,132,000	1	58,000	1,190,000
Episode 7	7 August 2016	973,000	2	39,000	1,012,000
Episode 8	10 August 2016	996,000	1	35,000	1,031,000
Episode 9	14 August 2016	953,000	2	35,000	988,000
Episode 10	17 August 2016	971,000	1	53,000	1,024,000
Series average		1,004,000	1	51,000	1,056,000
