= The Only Way Is Essex series 25 =

The Only Way Is Essex
- Series 25
- No. of episodes: 11

Release
- Original network: ITVBe
- Original release: 1 September – 10 November 2019

Series chronology
- ← Previous; Series 24 Next → Series 26

The twenty-fifth series of the British reality television programme The Only Way Is Essex began airing on 1 September 2019, and concluded on 10 November 2019 following 11 episodes. The first episode of the series marks the 300th overall episode of the show. Ahead of the series, it was announced that former Love Island star Olivia Attwood had joined the cast, having already made an appearance during the previous series. Frankie Sims and Matt Snape also joined the cast for this series. This series also featured one-off appearances from former cast members Charlie Sims, Danni Armstrong, Elliott Wright, Gemma Collins and Vas J Morgan. In October 2019, it was announced that Sam Mucklow and Shelby Tribble had quit the series. During the final episode, it was confirmed that a "The Only Way Is Essexmas" special would return having not aired the previous year.

This series included newly single Lockie and Yaz attempting to move on with their lives, Frankie and Harry beginning their relationship but hitting some hurdles on the way, and Bobby looking for love. It also featured the breakdown of Clelia and Shelby's friendship as well as the ongoing feud between Ella Wise and Chloe Brockett.

== Cast ==
- Amber Turner
- Bobby Cole Norris
- Charlie Sims
- Chloe Brockett
- Chloe Meadows
- Chloe Ross
- Chloe Sims
- Clare Brockett
- Clelia Theodorou
- Courtney Green
- Dan Edgar
- Danni Armstrong
- Demi Sims
- Ella Wise
- Elliott Wright
- Frankie Sims
- Gemma Collins
- Georgia Kousoulou
- Harry Lee
- James "Diags" Bennewith
- James "Lockie" Lock
- Jayden Beales
- Joey Turner
- Kelsey Stratford
- Liam Blackwell
- Matt Snape
- Olivia Attwood
- Pete Wicks
- Saffron Lempriere
- Sam Mucklow
- Shelby Tribble
- Tom McDonnell
- Tommy Mallet
- Vas J Morgan
- Yazmin Oukhellou

== Episodes ==
No. overall	No. in series	Title	Original release date	Duration	UK viewers
300	1	"Episode 1"	1 September 2019	60 minutes	1,009,000
Amber makes it clear to Dan that he’s still in the probation period of their rekindled relationship, whilst Shelby knows that getting back together with Sam has ruffled feathers for Tom. The feud between Chloe B and Kelsey is reignited when she discovers that ex-boyfriend Harry may have been playing the field, and the Sims family declare war on Amber and Dan. Elsewhere Harry is soaked following a confrontation with Chloe B, Lockie denies cheating on Yaz, and Clelia fails to understand how her friendship with Shelby broke down. Sam and Tom come to blows at Bobby’s birthday party, and Olivia clashes with Chloe M.
301	2	"Episode 2"	8 September 2019	60 minutes	983,000
Bobby is on a mission to find a man, whilst Shelby makes it her aim to find out the real reason her and Clelia have drifted. Diags’ loyalty is questioned when he spends more time with Dan and Amber, whilst Chloe B reaches out to Joey. Meanwhile Frankie sets her sights on Harry, Clare gives her daughter some tough love, and Sam and Tom lay their feud to rest. Clelia and Shelby share more cross words when the pair fail to clear the air, Amber comes face-to-face with Frankie, and Shelby is confused to hear that Olivia hasn’t been supporting her relationship with Sam.
302	3	"Episode 3"	15 September 2019	60 minutes	913,000
Yaz hits rock bottom but her spirit is lifted by encouraging words of Lockie’s ex-girlfriend Danni. Joey causes friction within the group by badmouthing Chloe M behind her back, whilst Dan questions why Pete is so against his relationship with Amber. Frankie agrees to go on a date with Harry, and Olivia and Shelby finally call a truce. Clelia discovers that Sam hasn’t been the loyal friend she thought he was, meanwhile Amber and Dan confront Pete over their comments made about them. Following much needed advice from the girls, Yaz gives Lockie some brutal home truths.
303	4	"Episode 4"	22 September 2019	60 minutes	967,000
Joey lays into Courtney and Chloe M when they all come face-to-face at the cinema, whilst Yaz lashes out at some of the girls by accusing them of flirting with Lockie. Harry takes Frankie out on a date, much to the disappointment of Chloe B, and Bobby attempts to find a man at a gay football event. Clelia feels she needs to rebuild her life starting with a conversation with Sam. Elsewhere Yaz dreads having to spend time with Lockie in the group’s upcoming trip to Marbella, Olivia tells Joey to be careful with his words, and Pete and Diags make it their mission to put a smile on Chloe S’s face.
304	5	"Episode 5: Marbella"	29 September 2019	60 minutes	1,099,000
In Marbella, there’s a huge divide between the girls in the aftermath of Olivia’s fight with Courtney. Kelsey begins to see Tom in a romantic light, whilst Frankie is confused by Harry’s past with Chloe B. Elsewhere Joey opens up to Olivia about his sexuality, Yaz gets an early flight home to get away from Lockie, and Frankie lays into Chloe B after discovering she has given him an ultimatum over their future. Joey clears the air with the girls, and Courtney and Chloe M admit they’re disappointed with Clelia for not defending them during their drama with Olivia.
305	6	"Episode 6: Marbella"	6 October 2019	60 minutes	977,000
Lockie admits that he feels more comfortable in Marbella now that Yaz has flown home, whilst Saffron has some explaining to do to the Sims sisters when Harry calls her out. Georgia consoles Liam when he breaks down, Dan and Pete have a catch-up with Elliott, and Amber feels that none of Dan’s friends like her. Elsewhere Saffron lashes out at Harry, and Clelia makes amends with Courtney and Chloe M. Speaking from how own experience, Dan gives Harry some much needed advice over how to deal with the two women in his life.
306	7	"Episode 7"	13 October 2019	60 minutes	990,000
News gets back to Amber that Diags still isn’t fully supportive of her relationship with Dan. Chloe S seeks answers when she believes her and Pete were married in a past life, and Ella opens up about her flirty conversations with Harry. Bobby is delighted when he meets a new man at a dance class and wastes no time in inviting him to Liam’s party, whilst Pete tries to trip Harry up when he quizzes him on his feelings towards Frankie. Diags tells Amber that she finally has his approval, meanwhile Chloe S is disappointed in Pete when he defends Ella’s behaviour.
307	8	"Episode 8"	20 October 2019	60 minutes	980,000
Ella and Harry’s different versions of events are the talk of Essex and Frankie doesn’t know who the believe. Bobby is smitten during his first date with Matt, and Tommy and Georgia celebrate their 5 year anniversary. Dan comes up with a cunning plan to get Diags and Amber talking again, meanwhile Frankie and Ella have it out as the pair come face-to-face. Lockie is stunned to hear that Yaz has hurled abuse at a girl he’s been dating, Olivia lets her feelings about Chloe B known, and Frankie kicks Harry to the curb following a further revelation. Elsewhere Courtney has her smear test.
308	9	"Episode 9"	27 October 2019	60 minutes	926,000
Diags encourages Dan to smooth things over with Chloe S, feeling the ongoing tension between them has been going on for long enough. Frankie is touched by Harry’s efforts to win her round and finally agrees to go to Amsterdam with him. Elsewhere Chloe B and Ella’s feud is reignited at the Halloween party as Harry’s lies continue to cause ructions, and Yaz and Lockie agree to be civil with each other. Olivia loses her temper with Joey for going from group to group with gossip, Saffron plans a chilling night for the girls, and Dan makes peace with Chloe S.
309	10	"Episode 10"	3 November 2019	60 minutes	1,058,934
Yaz sees red when she catches Lockie having a drink with Ella and Kelsey. Bobby and Chloe S have a catch up with Gemma, and Olivia and Amber clash on social media. Lockie realises that it’s better that he cuts all ties with Yaz, whilst Gemma announces she’s single, and a lonely Liam has a new project. Diags announces that he’s planning a birthday party for Chloe S which leaves Dan in awkward position with Amber, meanwhile the girls gate crash Bobby’s date with Matt. Yaz has some apologising to do, and Olivia and Amber’s bickering continues.
310	11	"Episode 11"	10 November 2019	60 minutes	996,000
Dan and Amber decide to decline Diags’ invitation to Chloe S’s birthday party which only causes more aggro in the group. Kelsey defends Ella as Joey continues to badmouth her to the girls, and Charlie returns to question Harry’s intentions with his sister. Yaz begins her new adventure away from Lockie, Bobby plans a trip to Paris with Matt, and Amber and Dan’s absence sets tongues wagging. Elsewhere, Harry asks Frankie to be his girlfriend, Olivia reaches out and apologises to Chloe M and Courtney, and Dan and Amber discuss the future.
311	12	"The Only Way Is Essexmas"	15 December 2019	60 minutes	610,000
Gemma returns one last time to celebrate Christmas with the group. Lockie and Yaz continue to fight and disrupt the Christmas spirit. Chloe B confronts Clelia in a heated confrontation. Saffron tries to comfort Chloe B who breaks down about her broken relationship with Harry. Tensions continue between Chloe S and Amber when she and Dan arrive late to the Christmas getaway. Bobby and Gemma have a heart to heart about Bobbys new relationship. A big argument erupts between Amber and Chloe S. Bobby and Matt make it official. This episode marks the final appearances from Gemma, Chloe R and Jayden.

== Ratings ==
Catch-up service totals were added to the official ratings.

Episode	Date	Total ITVBe viewers
Episode 1	1 September 2019	1,009,000
Episode 2	8 September 2019	983,000
Episode 3	15 September 2019	913,000
Episode 4	22 September 2019	967,000
Episode 5: Marbella	29 September 2019	1,099,000
Episode 6: Marbella	6 October 2019	977,000
Episode 7	13 October 2019	990,000
Episode 8	20 October 2019	980,000
Episode 9	27 October 2019	926,000
Episode 10	3 November 2019	1,058,000
Episode 11	10 November 2019	996,000
Essexmas	15 December 2019	610,000
Series average		991,000
