= The Only Way Is Essex series 26 =

The Only Way Is Essex
- Series 26
- No. of episodes: 18

Release
- Original network: ITVBe
- Original release: 13 September – 11 November 2020

Series chronology
- ← Previous; Series 25 Next → Series 27

The twenty-sixth series of the British reality television programme The Only Way Is Essex began airing on 13 September 2020. This series was due to air earlier in the year, but in March 2020, it was announced that filming had been postponed due to the COVID-19 pandemic in the United Kingdom. Whilst off air, it was announced that the series would return later in the year and would go back to airing two episodes per week, and that filming would take place with social distancing to protect cast and crew. Ahead of the series, it was announced that cast members Chloe Ross and Jayden Beales had been axed from the show. It was also confirmed that original cast member Amy Childs would be returning. Nicole Bass, Harry Derbidge and Fran Parman also returned.

During the series, the show celebrated its tenth anniversary, kicking off on 6 September 2020 with a special episode entitled "TOWIE Turns 10: All Back to Essex". The ninth episode, airing on 11 October 2020, was extended and featured a number of flashbacks as well as one-off appearances from former cast members including Danni Armstrong, Elliott Wright, Frankie Essex and Mario Falcone. As well as this, a spin-off series entitled The Towie Years aired for ten episodes across five weeks beginning on 10 October 2020. The series focused on the most memorable moments from each year. A festive special, "The Only Way Is Essexmas" aired on 16 December 2020, where cast members Georgia and Tommy announced they were expecting a baby.

== Cast ==
- Amber Turner
- Amy Childs
- Bobby Cole Norris
- Charlie Sims
- Chloe Brockett
- Chloe Meadows
- Chloe Sims
- Clare Brockett
- Clelia Theodorou
- Courtney Green
- Dan Edgar
- Danni Armstrong
- Demi Sims
- Ella Wise
- Elliott Wright
- Fran Parman
- Frankie Essex
- Frankie Sims
- Georgia Kousoulou
- Harry Derbidge
- Harry Lee
- James "Diags" Bennewith
- James "Lockie" Lock
- Joey Turner
- Kelsey Stratford
- Liam Blackwell
- Mario Falcone
- Matt Snape
- Nicole Bass
- Olivia Attwood
- Pete Wicks
- Polly Childs-Wright
- Saffron Lempriere
- Tom McDonnell
- Tommy Mallet
- Yazmin Oukhellou

== Episodes ==
No. overall	No. in series	Title	Original release date	Duration	UK viewers
–	–	"TOWIE Turns 10: All Back to Essex"	6 September 2020	60 minutes	389,000
312	1	"Episode 1"	13 September 2020	60 minutes	821,000
With lockdown restrictions easing off, the Essex gang are back together at a social distance. Lockie reveals him and Yaz are trying to give their relationship another go, whilst Chloe S and Pete worry their drifted friendship can’t be salvaged. Frankie S lashes out when she hears that Chloe B has been spreading rumours about her, meanwhile Amy returns to Essex and instantly makes amends with Bobby following a past feud. Ella is on the warpath after hearing that Chloe B has slept with her ex-boyfriend, and Liam struggles with isolation.
313	2	"Episode 2"	16 September 2020	60 minutes	693,000
Yaz worries when Lockie disappears without any contact after a night out. Georgia organises a welcome home part for Liam, whilst Ella clashes with Courtney and Chloe M over their friendship with Chloe B. Lockie has some making up to do with Yaz, and Chloe S is upset that Pete didn’t reach out to her during lockdown. Chloe B reveals there’s more than what meets the eye in Frankie S and Harry L’s relationship, and Demi announces she’s no longer single. Elsewhere Ella and Chloe B fail to make amends as their rivalry creates divided opinions in Essex.
314	3	"Episode 3"	20 September 2020	60 minutes	790,000
Chloe S and Pete finally meet to discuss the problems in their friendship. Meanwhile Amy starts a book club, and Harry D announces he has postponed his wedding. Chloe B rages when she finds out that Olivia and Nicole have been bad mouthing her, whilst Courtney breaks down after feeling that her life isn’t going in the direction she hoped for. Pete suggests couples therapy to Chloe S in order to get things back to how they were, Chloe B confronts those who have wronged her, and Chloe M arranges a friendship ceremony in order to raise Courtney’s spirits.
315	4	"Episode 4"	23 September 2020	60 minutes	831,000
Olivia is torn between her life in Essex and her fiancé in Manchester. Diags realise that life is too short and wants to complete a series of challenges before he turns 30, whilst the group reel from a fallout between Clelia and Bobby. Frankie S lays into Chloe B when the pair come face to face, Liam celebrates his birthday in style, and it’s Yaz’s turn to come up with a romantic gesture for Lockie. Tom admits to wanting to pursue Ella again, meanwhile Bobby and Clelia clear the air, and Olivia decides to leave Essex for a new life.
316	5	"Episode 5"	27 September 2020	60 minutes	798,000
Yaz has shocks Lockie by announcing she could be pregnant. Ella agrees to go on a date with Tom, whilst Chloe S fears that Pete isn’t making enough effort with her despite recently rekindling their friendship. Harry L organises axe throwing in a bid to bond with the Sims family, meanwhile Courtney and Chloe M arrange cocktail making to cheer up Chloe B. Amber confronts Harry L over his accusations made about Chloe B, Yaz discovers the pregnancy scare was a false alarm, and Kelsey opens up about her tough home life during lockdown. Elsewhere Liam suggest a group trip to London.
317	6	"Episode 6"	30 September 2020	60 minutes	848,000
As the group head to London, Diags is shocked to come face-to-face with a ghost from his past. Bobby has a risky conversation with Matt as he becomes broody, whilst Georgia feels there’s more than meets the eye with Chloe S and Pete’s issues. Meanwhile Frankie S lashes out at Amber, Chloe B is adamant that Harry L will screw up his relationship again, and Chloe S loses patience with Pete. Fran is disappointed over the frosty reception Diags gives her, whilst Demi shares news of trouble in paradise between Amber and Dan. Elsewhere, back in Essex, Tom takes Ella out on a date.
318	7	"Episode 7"	4 October 2020	60 minutes	885,000
Amber isn’t happy with Dan after finding out he’s confided in Demi about their relationship struggles during lockdown, and Matt makes plans to celebrate Bobby’s birthday in style. Elsewhere Amber accuses Demi of bending the truth, Ella and Tom agree to go on a second date, and Pete reaches out to Chloe S. Ella and Tom admit to the difficulties of getting to know each other under the social distancing rules, whilst Frankie S jumps to her sister’s defence when she comes under scrutiny from Dan. Pete and Chloe S confess the real reason behind their turbulent friendship.
319	8	"Episode 8"	7 October 2020	60 minutes	759,000
Yaz is caught in the middle when her close friend Nicole goes head-to-head with Amber. Elsewhere, news of the blurred lines in Chloe S and Pete’s friendship spreads around Essex, and Ella fears Chloe B has a hidden agenda for trying to reach out to Kelsey. Liam announces he’s releasing new music, whilst Georgia and Tommy celebrate Monkey’s birthday in style. Saffron opens up about her struggles with loneliness this year, Harry L has an idea for Tom to keep Ella keen, and Chloe S and Pete take some more time apart from each other.
320	9	"Episode 9"	11 October 2020	75 minutes	727,000
The group take a trip down memory lane and discuss their last 10 years in Essex with some familiar faces. Amy and Demi compete to be Harry D’s head maid of honour at his wedding, whilst Diags takes on his biggest challenge yet as he jumps from a plane. Danni introduces her new baby girl, Mario takes his son for a kick about, and Lockie has a catch-up with Elliott. Yaz is drained when Nicole and Amber’s feud continues, meanwhile Bobby and Harry D have an awkward reunion, and Pete tells Chloe S he wants to be fully committed to her.
321	10	"Episode 10"	14 October 2020	60 minutes	683,000
Amy comes up with a cunning plan to bring Kelsey and Chloe B together. Chloe S organises a birthday party for Demi, and Liam is back in the studio recording new material. Elsewhere Clelia feels Yaz is being unfair for not siding with Nicole during her bickers with Amber, and Ella isn’t happy to discover that Kelsey and Chloe B have agreed to be civil with each other. Harry L and Diags team up to perform Puppet Cinderella at Demi’s party, Yaz waits for Lockie to make their relationship official, and Nicole and Amber come to blows once again.
322	11	"Episode 11"	18 October 2020	60 minutes	716,000
Amy feels out of her comfort zone during the school run as she worries she doesn’t fit in with the other Mums. Amber becomes wary of Yaz’s loyalties, whilst Nicole also fears that Yaz may be siding with the enemy. Bobby sets himself a mission to educate children about online trolling, and Ella feels betrayed by Kelsey for becoming civil with Chloe B despite her only finding a common ground with her to end the animosity between the girls. Elsewhere Dan thinks Pete may resent him for his past with Chloe S, and Ella and Chloe B have another blazing row.
323	12	"Episode 12"	21 October 2020	60 minutes	830,000
Pete returns and is determined to win back Chloe S’s trust. Elsewhere Amy and Demi compete to bake the best cake for Harry D’s wedding, but are both left upstaged by Saffron, whilst Bobby’s concerns about his future are confirmed during a tarot reading. Harry L sets up a romantic date with Frankie to celebrate their first anniversary, Ella lays into Joey, and Chloe M worries about how her family’s fertility problems may affect her chances of having children. Dan addresses an issue with Pete, and Diags and Courtney learn to tap dance.
324	13	"Episode 13"	25 October 2020	60 minutes	781,000
Amber is furious that Dan’s past with Chloe S is dragged back up, whilst Liam worries his music video isn’t being taken seriously when Diags and Tommy sabotage it. Elsewhere, Yaz organises a couples retreat to relieve some tension, and Chloe B reaches out to Kelsey for a long overdue catch-up, but both fear how Ella may react. Dan feels a previous comment to Chloe S has been taken out of context, Yaz and Lockie make their relationship official, and Bobby is forced to address his worries with Matt. Pete continues to work on making things right with Chloe S.
325	14	"Episode 14"	28 October 2020	60 minutes	677,000
Bobby reveals that Matt has moved back to Reading so they can work on their relationship at a slower pace. Chloe B is racked with guilt and is determined to fix her past mistakes, and Amber is concerned that something isn’t quite right between herself and Yaz. A rift is formed between Harry L and Frankie following an argument between the couple, Diags apologises to Liam, and Chloe M organises a spelling bee. Frankie and Harry L sit down and have a heart-to-heart, whilst Amber and Yaz agree to go their separate ways.
326	15	"Episode 15"	1 November 2020	60 minutes	726,000
Dan and Lockie fear they’ll be dragged into their girlfriend’s feud, and Chloe S lets Pete know how much she appreciates the effort he’s put into rebuilding their friendship. Ella becomes under scrutiny when Chloe B accuses her of seeing somebody behind Tom’s back. Harry L and Frankie see no way back for their relationship following an emotional conversation, whilst Ella turns the tables on Tom after he questions her about a rumour. Tommy and Georgia celebrate their sixth anniversary, and Chloe S and Demi urge Harry L to fight for Frankie.
327	16	"Episode 16"	4 November 2020	60 minutes	614,000
Harry L gets emotional when opening up to Tom about his break-up with Frankie, meanwhile Chloe S admires how strong Frankie is in handling it. Courtney plans a surprise birthday party for Chloe M – where the tension between Amber and Yaz increases. Ella and Tom agree to forget about their mistakes and focus on their future instead. Diags, Dan and Liam give Chloe M a birthday performance she will never forget, Ella is angry with Chloe B meddling in her business again, and Harry L asks Demi to pass on a message to Frankie.
328	17	"Episode 17"	8 November 2020	60 minutes	659,000
Nicole decides to remove all the negativity from her life and starts by clearing the air with Chloe B, but Clelia fails to see why she would side with the enemy. Kelsey hosts a charity to raise awareness of Spinal muscular atrophy, a condition which her sister lives with. Bobby comes to a realisation that his relationship may not be working after all, whilst Amber prepares to move into Dan’s bachelor pad. Amy and Tommy go head-to-head to become ping pong champion, Chloe S helps Diags to better himself, and Chloe B assures Harry that he has her support.
329	18	"Episode 18"	11 November 2020	60 minutes	590,000
Bobby announces he’s split with Matt, whilst Lockie prepares to meet with Yaz’s parents for the first time since their original break-up. Demi and Amy agree to work together on Harry D’s stag party, Frankie is irritated by Chloe B’s actions towards Harry, and Tom asks Ella to be in his Support Bubble, as per government guidelines. Saffron calls Chloe B out on her behaviour, and Diags and Chloe S go head-to-head to host rival 1920’s themed parties. Lockie receives a frosty reception from Yaz’s family, and Harry reaches out to Frankie.
330	19	"The Only Way Is Essexmas"	11 November 2020	80 minutes	781,000
Frankie is overwhelmed when she comes face-to-face with Harry for the first time since their break-up. Pete realises he can’t give Chloe S what she wants so is forced to take a step back from her, whilst Tom makes a discovery about Ella. Liam introduces his new girlfriend Sophie onto the scene, Frankie lashes out at Chloe B, and Ella admits to Tom that she’s been dating other people behind his back. Elsewhere Amber and Dan celebrate their first Christmas living together, Kelsey struggles with self-isolation, and Georgia and Tommy announce to the group that they’re expecting a baby.

== Ratings ==
Catch-up service totals were added to the official ratings.

Episode	Date	Total ITVBe viewers
TOWIE Turns 10: All Back to Essex	6 September 2020	389,000
Episode 1	13 September 2020	821,000
Episode 2	16 September 2020	693,000
Episode 3	20 September 2020	790,000
Episode 4	23 September 2020	831,000
Episode 5	27 September 2020	798,000
Episode 6	30 September 2020	848,000
Episode 7	4 October 2020	885,000
Episode 8	7 October 2020	759,000
Episode 9	11 October 2020	727,000
Episode 10	14 October 2020	683,000
Episode 11	18 October 2020	716,000
Episode 12	21 October 2020	830,000
Episode 13	25 October 2020	781,000
Episode 14	28 October 2020	677,000
Episode 15	1 November 2020	726,000
Episode 16	4 November 2020	614,000
Episode 17	8 November 2020	659,000
Episode 18	11 November 2020	590,000
Essexmas	16 December 2020	781,000
Series average		746,000
