= Lewis Ellis =

British media personality

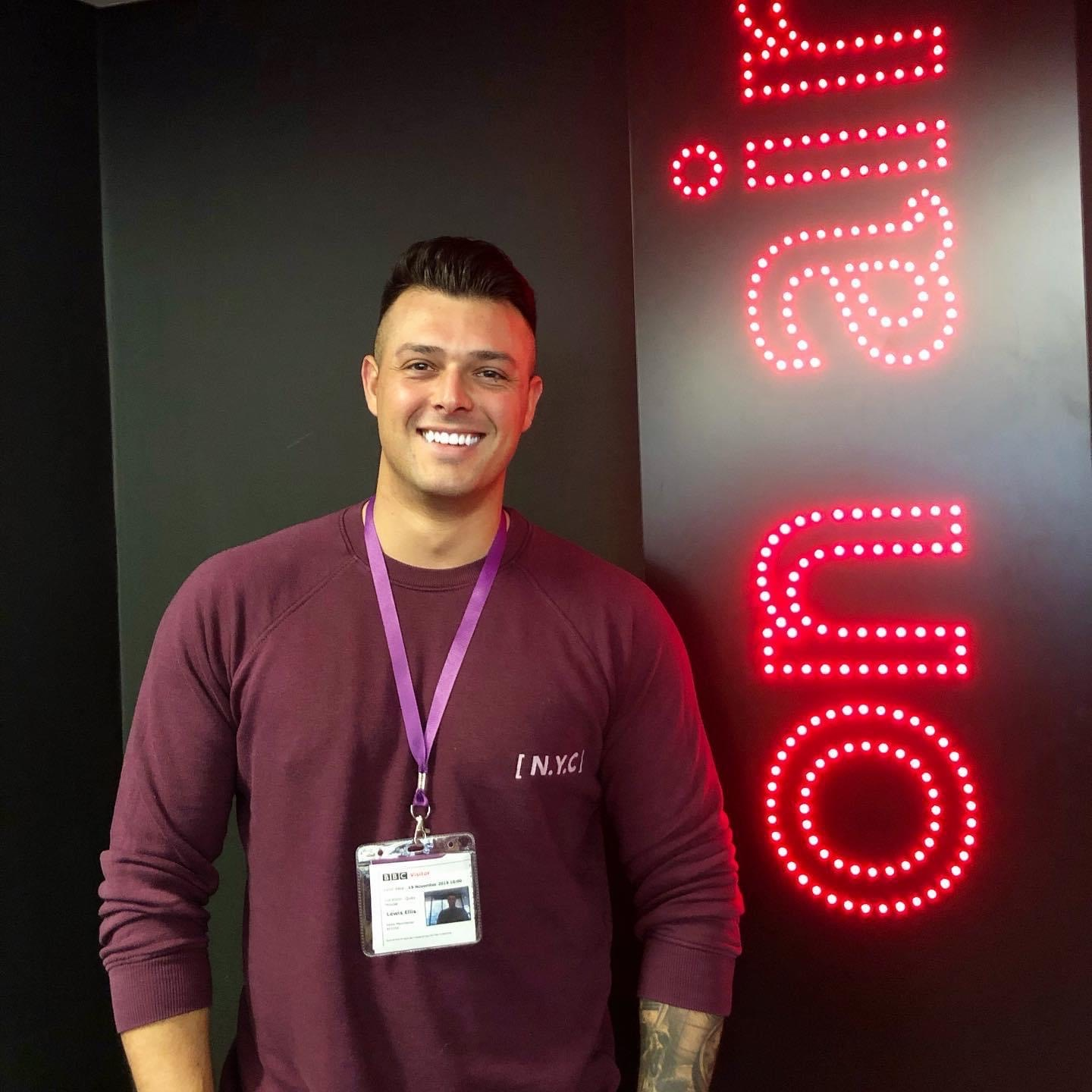
- Lewis at BBC Radio Media City Manchester
- Born: 27 August 1990 (age 36); Manchester, England
- Education: University of Chester
- Occupations: Entrepreneur media personality
- Television: The Apprentice; The Apprentice: You're Fired!

Lewis Ellis (born 27 August 1990) is a British media personality and entrepreneur, featured on the BBC One show The Apprentice and Open House, the Great Sex Experiment on Channel 4.

== Early life ==
Ellis was born in Manchester, He had his BA and MSc from the University of Chester.

== Career ==
In 2019, Ellis joined the 15th season of BBC One Television Series The Apprentice to win a £250,000 investment from Alan Sugar, his business idea during the show was to go into a Travel business with Alan Sugar, the show host. He was evicted from the house in week eleven, he got to the interview stage of the show and came fourth.

Ellis also appeared as a guest on the BBC Two spin-off show The Apprentice: You're Fired! with BGT star Daliso Chaponda and comedian Tom Allen in Episode Eight. He was also invited to participate in the filming of BBC Two's You're Hired!, which is the spin-off show for The Final.

Before appearing on The Apprentice, Ellis was a YouTube Prankster most notable for jumping into a pool at the Manchester's Trafford Centre food court in 2016. He went into entrepreneurship and started a Travel company after his stay in the house.

In 2022 he appeared in six episodes of Channel 4's Open House, the Great Sex Experiment. He founded Hiddn Travel Ltd in 2019 and Hussel Marketing Ltd. In 2020.

== Controversy ==
During Ellis's tenure on The Apprentice, there were allegations of a romantic encounter with fellow contestant Lottie Lion while they were in Finland for a task. The pair reportedly grew closer while staying in the show's house.

Ellis also faced criticism from British businessman Alan Sugar for his tattoo, which Sugar described as "horrific", after Ellis stripped down to his swimming shorts for a campaign promoting summertime in Finland. In response, Ellis defended his tattoo and even got another tattoo of the businessman holding a gun. He was further criticised for creating a disruptive marketing campaign in Liverpool using a faux Elton John.

== Radio appearances ==
Year	Radio	Program	Notes
2019	BBC Radio Manchester	Becky Want	Guest
2019	BBC Radio Manchester	Drivetime with Phil Trow	Guest
2019	BBC Radio Lancashire	Weekly Guest Graham Liver	Guest
2019	BBC Asian Network	Breakfast Show	Guest
2019	BBC Radio 5 Live	Wake Up to Money	Guest
2019	London Live	Entertainment with Alicia Edwards	Guest
2020	BBC Manchester	Drivetime with Phil Trow	Guest
2020	BBC Radio Lancashire	Thursday Night Takeover	Guest
2022	Heart (radio network)	Heart Breakfast with Jamie Theakston and Amanda Holden	Guest
2022	Virgin Radio Dubai	Kris Fade Show	Guest

== Filmography ==
Year	Title	Role
2019	The Apprentice	appeared in 14 episodes
2019	The Apprentice: You're Fired! 2019	appeared in 1 episode
2022	Open House, the Great Sex Experiment' Channel 4 series, 2022.	appeared in 6 episodes

== Airpod Adventure ==
Ellis went viral when he flew 4000 miles to Qatar to recover his lost Airpod. He found it with Apple's "Find my Device" service.

== Charity ==
In April 2020, Ellis and Ryan-Mark Parsons said they would aim to complete a skydive to raise money for the NHS in light of the COVID-19 pandemic, explaining in an interview with Daily Star "all of the money raised now is going straight to the NHS, and we'll do the skydive after lockdown.

== See also ==
- The Apprentice (British series 15)
