= The Only Way Is Essex series 24 =

The Only Way Is Essex
- Series 24
- No. of episodes: 11

Release
- Original network: ITVBe
- Original release: 17 March – 26 May 2019

Series chronology
- ← Previous; Series 23 Next → Series 25

The twenty-fourth series of the British reality television programme The Only Way Is Essex began airing on 17 March 2019 with a special episode as the cast visited Thailand. Ahead of the series, it was announced that a large number of cast members had quit the series or had been axed from the show. These include Adam Oukhello, Chloe Lewis, Chris and Jon Clark, Dean Ralph, James Argent, Jordan Wright and Myles Barnett. Original cast member Lauren Pope also quit the show before the launch, despite appearing in promo images for the new series. Therefore, no original cast members appeared in this series. The new cast members replacing them were Chloe and Clare Brockett, Chloe Ross, Ella Wise, Harry Lee, Jayden Beales, Joey Turner, Kelsey Stratford and Tom McDonnell. Despite announcements that Amber Turner and Gemma Collins would not be returning for this series, they both made appearances. Former cast members and Love Island winners Cara De La Hoyde and Nathan Massey also made a brief appearance during this series.

The series focused on the feud between childhood friends Chloe B, Ella and Kelsey, a love triangle between Shelby, Sam and Tom, as well as the brief relationship between Chloe S and Dan until his ex-girlfriend Amber returned to throw a spanner in the works. It also focused on Bobby attempting to put a stop to homophobic abuse online, and Pete and Liam putting the past behind them to become friends again.

== Cast ==
- Amber Turner
- Bobby Cole Norris
- Cara De La Hoyde
- Chloe Brockett
- Chloe Meadows
- Chloe Ross
- Chloe Sims
- Clare Brockett
- Clelia Theodorou
- Courtney Green
- Dan Edgar
- Demi Sims
- Ella Wise
- Gemma Collins
- Georgia Kousoulou
- Harry Lee
- James "Diags" Bennewith
- James "Lockie" Lock
- Jayden Beales
- Joey Turner
- Kelsey Stratford
- Liam Blackwell
- Nathan Massey
- Pete Wicks
- Saffron Lempriere
- Sam Mucklow
- Shelby Tribble
- Tom McDonnell
- Tommy Mallet
- Yazmin Oukhellou

== Episodes ==
No. overall	No. in series	Title	Original release date	Duration	UK viewers
289	1	"TOWIE: Thailand Part 1"	17 March 2019	60 minutes	913,000
In Thailand, Dan explains the breakdown of his relationship with Amber before catching the eye of Chloe R. Shelby prepares to open up to Sam about her growing feelings for him, only to be left red faced when she overhears a conversation about him wanting to pursue Demi instead. The girls rally round to support a furious Shelby, whilst Chloe S questions Sam’s intentions with her sister. Dan, Diags and Liam play tit for tat. Back in Essex Harry sets his sights on Chloe B, while Kelsey is also on the lookout for a new man in her life. Elsewhere Joey upsets Chloe B with comments about her lips.
290	2	"TOWIE: Thailand Part 2"	24 March 2019	60 minutes	938,000
Shelby is overwhelmed by the comfort she’s receiving from Pete, whilst Sam continues to impress Demi with his romantic gestures. Kesley admits to Chloe B that she has her eye on Jayden, and Chloe S confesses that she has recently seen Dan in a different light. Diags breaks down when offering Chloe S some much needed advice regarding the Dan situation, whereas in Essex, Ella and Chloe B clash over the ongoing drift in their friendship. Elsewhere Sam and Clelia clear the air, Harry fights for Chloe B’s attention, and Chloe S and Dan finally agree to give romance a go.
291	3	"Episode 3"	31 March 2019	60 minutes	919,000
The stakes are high between Dan and Chloe S as they contemplate trying to make a relationship work or just remaining friends. Kelsey desperately tries to fix the divide between Chloe B and Ella as their fallout continues. Sam and Shelby make swipes at each other on social media, whilst Chloe S is hurt that Diags isn’t considering her feelings during the situation with Dan. Chloe B plays cupid by attempting to set Kelsey and Jayden up, and Dan and Chloe S go against advice and decide to take things at their own pace. Elsewhere Ella and Chloe B resolve their issues, and Demi catches the eyes of Tom.
292	4	"Episode 4"	7 April 2019	60 minutes	1,067,000
Tommy organises a charity football match between the Essex boys to raise mental health awareness. Chloe B and Harry’s date ends in disaster when the pair clash over his wandering eyes, and his attention quickly turns to Chloe R instead. Georgia gives Courtney some home truths as she continues to meddle in Dan and Chloe S’s new romance by revealing he’s still in contact with his ex-girlfriend. Elsewhere Lockie returns to bring some positive energy to the group, Tom admits that Shelby would be his ideal date, and Chloe S and Diags finally clear the air following their recent animosity.
293	5	"Episode 5"	14 April 2019	60 minutes	1,032,000
Bobby makes it his mission to stop homophobia online by attempting to make it a criminal offence. Chloe S is knocked for six when Dan tells her they need to cool things off, whilst Harry is furious to hear that Chloe B has been slagging him off. Yaz returns in a better frame of mind following her break from Essex, Liam has his eyes on an older woman, and Michelle Visage surprises Bobby by turning up at his event. Georgia seeks help from Diags to ensure that it’s not the end for Chloe S and Dan, whilst Harry and Chloe B clash, and Tom agrees to take Shelby on a date. Meanwhile Demi is forced to let Sam down gently.
294	6	"Episode 6"	21 April 2019	60 minutes	1,058,000
Clare panics when Liam asks her out on a date. Chloe S reveals she’s walked away from Dan but it doesn’t stop the girls from gossiping about the possibility of him going out and kissing girls. Shelby prepares to draw the line under her feud with Sam, whilst Chloe B advises Liam about how to handle her Mum when it comes to dating her. Sam has a proposal for Chloe M, Harry continues to graft Chloe R, and Georgia tears up at the lack of recent quality time she’s spent with Tommy. Chloe seeks some much needed advice from Olivia before calling out the gossips in the group.
295	7	"Episode 7"	28 April 2019	60 minutes	1,031,000
Georgia gets some much needed help regarding her skin insecurities, and Tommy is by her side offering his full support. Chloe B’s friends turn against her when news spreads of her kiss with Harry despite him planning a date with Chloe R. Bobby raises more awareness for his campaign by appearing on Loose Women, whilst Amber returns to Essex to get to the bottom of what’s been going on between Chloe S and Dan. Chloe B and Chloe R team up against Harry when they realise they’ve been mugged off, Clelia tears up as she confides in Sam about the breakdown of her relationship, and Amber realises that Dan has been playing her for a fool.
296	8	"Episode 8"	5 May 2019	60 minutes	960,000
A rift is formed between the girls when Kelsey turns her back on Chloe B for getting close with Harry, whilst Chloe S meets up with Dan to draw a line under their relationship and to salvage their friendship instead. Bobby is delighted to receive 100,000 signatures on his petition, and Kelsey realises Chloe B has been trying to flirt with Jayden. Elsewhere Amber has some harsh home truths for Dan, Chloe B faces the wrath of Kesley and Ella, and Liam and Clare agree that they’re better off as friends. Courtney attempts to prove herself as grown up, and Harry is there to support a lonely Chloe B.
297	9	"Episode 9"	12 May 2019	60 minutes	879,000
Dan reaches out to Diags in order to get their friendship back to how it used to be. Chloe S is overwhelmed by Pete’s attempts to boost her spirits, whilst Tom and Shelby got cosy on their date unaware that Sam is getting growing feelings for her again. Harry tells Kelsey and Ella that they’re being unfair with the way their treating Chloe B, whilst Gemma catches up on all the recent Essex gossip with Chloe S. The girls come to blows again when Chloe B overhears Ella badmouth her, and the boys are divided over whom to support. Elsewhere after the success of his campaign, Bobby sets his sights higher.
298	10	"Episode 10"	19 May 2019	60 minutes	835,000
Gemma decides she needs somebody to look after her shop whilst she’s in LA, and picks Joey as the perfect candidate. Sam continues to pursue Shelby despite her going on dates with Tom, whilst Chloe S, Demi and Pete go camping to clear their heads of all negativity. Meanwhile, Dan has a lot of making up to do to Diags, Joey and Kelsey come to blows, and Tommy and Georgia help Cara and Nathan plan their dream wedding. Tom lays all his card on the table when he fears that Sam is breathing down his neck, and Georgia organises a no make-up photoshoot for the girls. Kelsey realises that her and Jayden are better off as friends.
299	11	"Episode 11"	26 May 2019	60 minutes	879,000
As the group head off to Southend-on-Sea, Kelsey is worried about an inevitable conversation with Jayden, whilst Chloe B worries that Harry is starting to distance himself from her. Bobby is distraught following more homophobic abuse online, Shelby is torn over two boys, and Demi rekindles a relationship with her ex-girlfriend. Elsewhere Chloe B calls a truce with Kelsey and Ella, Harry reassured Chloe B that he’s committed, and Dan and Chloe S are happy with their friendship situation. Shelby tells Sam that they need to stop flirting with each other so she can concentrate on getting to know Tom more.

== Reception ==
=== Ratings ===
Catch-up service totals were added to the official ratings.

Episode	Date	Total ITVBe viewers
TOWIE: Thailand 1	17 March 2019	913,000
TOWIE: Thailand 2	24 March 2019	938,000
Episode 3	31 March 2019	919,999
Episode 4	7 April 2019	1,067,000
Episode 5	14 April 2019	1,032,000
Episode 6	21 April 2019	1,058,000
Episode 7	28 April 2019	1,031,000
Episode 8	5 May 2019	960,000
Episode 9	12 May 2019	879,000
Episode 10	19 May 2019	835,000
Episode 11	26 May 2019	879,000
Series average		956,000
