= Jordan Wright (TV personality) =

English television personality (1992–2026)

- Wright in 2018
- Born: July 1992; Stanford-le-Hope, Essex, England
- Died: 14 March 2026 (aged 33); Phuket, Thailand
- Occupation: Television personality

Jordan Wright (27 July 1992 – 14 March 2026) was an English television personality, known for appearing as a cast member on the seventh series of Ex on the Beach in 2017 and the ITV reality series The Only Way Is Essex in 2018.

== Life and career ==
Jordan Wright was born in July 1992 in Stanford-le-Hope, Essex. Prior to appearing on television, he worked as a firefighter, as well as a DJ. He was in a relationship with television personality Vicky Pattison in 2016. In 2017, Wright became a cast member on the seventh series of Ex on the Beach, in which he was reunited with his ex-girlfriend, Sydney Longmuir. In 2018, he joined the cast of the ITV reality series The Only Way Is Essex. He appeared as a cast member during the show's twenty-second and twenty-third series, departing during the latter after being axed from the show.

=== Death ===
On 14 March 2026, Wright was found dead lying face down in a drainage canal in Phuket, Thailand, having relocated to the country several months previously. He was 33. Wright had earlier been seen acting erratically outside a nearby hotel, in acquired CCTV footage. A statement from Choeng Thale police station stated that Wright's body had subsequently been transported to Vachira Phuket Hospital for an autopsy. Tributes were paid to him by a spokesperson from The Only Way Is Essex, as well as several of the show's cast members including Chloe Brockett and Liam "Gatsby" Blackwell.

== Filmography ==
As himself
Year	Title	Notes	Ref.
2017	Ex on the Beach	Cast member; series 7	
2018	The Only Way Is Essex	Main role	
