= Ryan-Mark Parsons =

British media personality and columnist

Ryan-Mark Parsons FRSA
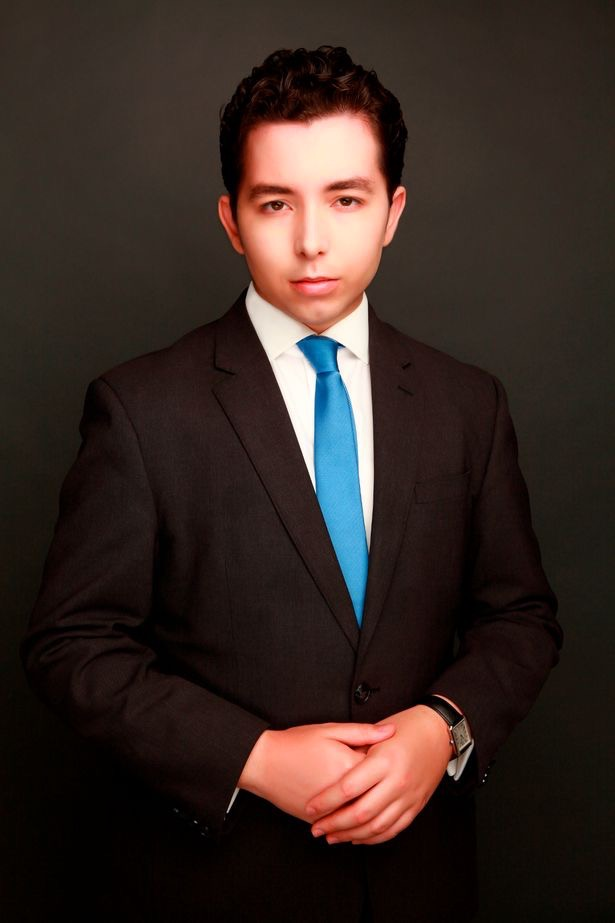
- Parsons in 2020
- Born: 4 April 2000 (age 26); London, United Kingdom
- Education: Babington House School
- Occupations: Media personality; columnist; commentator; political advisor
- Years active: 2019–present
- Employers: Daily Star (2020–2023); Daily Express (2024–present); The Daily Telegraph (2026–present)
- Television: The Apprentice; Good Morning Britain; Newsnight; Sky News; TalkTV; GB News; Celebrity Eating with My Ex (BBC Three); Celebs Go Dating; Celebrity Hot Property (BBC Three); More than Daffs and Taffs (S4C)

Ryan-Mark Parsons (born 4 April 2000) is a British media personality, columnist, commentator and political advisor. Parsons is best known for being the youngest-ever candidate on the BBC One reality series The Apprentice (2019) and starring in E4's Celebs Go Dating.

Parsons has also featured in viral and controversial debates on Good Morning Britain. In September 2020, he was named a columnist for the Daily Star and later for the Daily Express in 2024, and The Daily Telegraph in 2026.

== Early life ==
Parsons was born on 4 April 2000 in London, United Kingdom. He was educated at Babington House School, a private school in Chislehurst, southeast London, and claimed that he chose not to go to university. Before his media career, Parsons worked at Harrods in retail sales for Gucci as a 'brand ambassador'; alongside internships at the Palace of Westminster, Matrix Chambers, 5 King's Bench Walk, AIG and NHS.

== Career ==
=== 2019–2020: The Apprentice and the Daily Star ===
Parsons joined The Apprentice, aged 19, as the youngest-ever candidate since the show began in 2005. Parsons' performance was praised by Sean O'Grady, Associate Editor of The Independent, stating the "cherubic Ryan-Mark Parsons is the real winner of this series." Similarly in The Telegraph, Anita Singh wrote: "Technically, there are a dozen contestants in the show. Really, there are only three: Thomas Skinner and Lottie Lion, and Ryan-Mark."

During Week Six, Parsons tested one of the rollercoasters at Thorpe Park, which caused thousands of viewers to react online. According to Hello!, 13,000 X (Twitter) mentions and 10,000 hashtags were used, which made this scene one of the most talked about TV moments of 2019.

Parsons later appeared on The Apprentice: You're Fired! hosted by Tom Allen on BBC Two, alongside guests Dominic Holland, Tomeka Empson and Claudine Collins.

In 2020, Parsons featured in The Apprentice Best Bits, which was a six-part compilation series across fifteen series of the show. It was created to replace the 2020 series, which was cancelled due to the COVID-19 pandemic.

Parsons was fired 'with regret' in Week Eight of The Apprentice and the episode overall gained 6.6 million viewers. In his exit interviews, Parsons caused controversy after calling fellow candidates "desperate."

Various pictures surfaced of Parsons in December 2019, including at McDonald's in one of their London restaurants eating with a knife and fork. The story was subsequently reported by a number of online newspapers and became viral. US-based celebrity podcast, Who? Weekly, addressed the story in the episode: 'British reality star Ryan-Mark Parsons (he likes McDonald's)'.

On 23 January 2020, Parsons featured as a panellist in a Good Morning Britain debate over whether Australia should 'sell koala fur' to fund bushfire aid. Parsons made the argument that dead koala fur could be sold "to raise money for the injured animals in the rescue centres." This was criticised by animal rights activist, Wendy Turner Webster, who called his idea "grotesque", alongside presenter Susanna Reid labelling the suggestion as "sick." He was met with widespread public and media backlash from UK, Australian and New Zealand press, denouncing Parsons for his views.

At the start of September 2020, it was announced Parsons would join the Daily Star as a weekly columnist. The newspaper described him: "Often controversial, Parsons will bring his no-holds-barred opinions to Daily Star Online, talking about the biggest events in television."

Parsons made several radio appearances in 2019, including TalkRadio with Julia Hartley-Brewer, BBC Radio 5 Live: Wake Up to Money, and BBC Asian Network.

=== 2021–2022: Media appearances, Celebs Go Dating and presenting ===
Parsons appeared on the celebrity series of BBC Three's Eating with My Ex, which aired on 14 February 2021.

From March 2021, it emerged Parsons joined RT as a regular contributor, first featuring in a report on Oprah with Meghan and Harry. He has since presented a series of reports for the Russian-funded network, including covering Prince Harry's remarks on First Amendment to the United States Constitution.

On 3 June 2021, Parsons was also involved in a highly contentious Good Morning Britain debate with Richard Madeley, Charlotte Hawkins, and Dr Hilary Jones over whether under-30s should be punished for not taking the COVID-19 vaccine. Parsons argued under-30s should be punished, including bans from public venues. He claimed in his Daily Star column, death threats made after the debate were being investigated by the Metropolitan Police. The clip of the debate on X (Twitter) received over 500,000 views.

Parsons appeared on 'Andrew Neil Live' on 23 June 2021 to debate whether employers could force staff to take COVID-19 vaccines before being allowed to return to the office. Morgan Stanley announced staff would need to be double-vaccinated to enter their New York offices, to which Parsons argued in favour of this action during the debate.

ITV announced on 14 October 2021, Parsons would take part in an online Good Morning Britain spin-off called Off The Table, hosted by Julie Adenuga. The channel said: "The new series will feature four hot topic 15 minute episodes which will be published across a month, including money, climate change, cancel culture and life after Covid."

On 27 October 2021, Channel 4 announced Parsons would be taking part in the tenth series of Celebs Go Dating on E4. Parsons and the show were criticised by The Independent's Sean O'Grady, calling Celebs Go Dating "sadistic" and claiming "he should be at school." According to dating agent Anna Williamson, Parsons received the worst score in Celebs Go Dating history and was put on hold from further dates.

On 14 February 2022, BBC announced Parsons would feature in the new celebrity series of Hot Property on BBC Three, which sees celebrities visit the homes of potential matches and eventually landing a blind date.

Parsons started presenting for boohooMAN in March 2022, alongside Love Island series seven contestant Toby Aromolaran and series eight winner Davide Sanclimenti, in a series of videos published online.

On 24 November 2022, Parsons announced a digital series for Channel 4 which was produced by Lime Pictures and 4Studios, which followed Parsons around the UK asking the public about love and relationships.

=== 2023–present: Welsh documentary, The Daily Telegraph and House of Commons ===
In March 2023, Parsons appeared in More than Daffs and Taffs, premiering on BBC iPlayer and S4C's Hansh. The series followed reality stars, including Gemma Collins, challenge clichés attached to Wales, presented by Miriam Isaac.

An interview in March 2023 revealed Parsons would be taking part in Tony n' Tina's Wedding, playing Joey Vitale at the ArcelorMittal Orbit in London, produced by Paul Gregg.

Parsons returned to series twelve of Celebs Go Dating, which aired in August 2023, where he dated Made in Chelsea's Mark-Francis Vandelli on the request of agents Anna Williamson and Paul Brunson.

On 1 February 2024, Parsons started writing for the Daily Express, first covering the return of series eighteen of The Apprentice. In 2026, he began writing for The Daily Telegraph, starting with a piece on Young Conservatives following high-profile defections to Reform UK.

== Views ==
Since Parsons' appearance on The Apprentice, he has expressed controversial viewpoints in his newspaper columns, on television and radio.

=== Fur trade ===
Parsons supports the trade of animal fur. During his appearance on Good Morning Britain, he argued that the fur from koalas killed in the Australian bushfire could be used to "capitalise on and cater to" strong global demand for fur products. Also explaining the fur could be used for "a scarf for example. It could be something someone could wear."

=== Political correctness ===
Parsons is anti-PC and has criticised the removal of shows like Come Fly With Me, which was pulled from streaming services Netflix and BBC iPlayer. He claimed there is a rise of a "snowflake movement" and is "excited we have [Spitting Image] on our screens that could offend people and pushes the boundaries beyond the sanitised and soporific 'entertainment' that we see nowadays."

=== Royal Family ===
In an article published in response to Oprah with Meghan and Harry, Parsons supported the Queen and other members of the British royal family. He called the interview "Oscar-worthy" and "a shameless, callous, and brutal character assassination on the Royal Family", which aimed to "fatally destroy the reputation of the Queen."

=== Vaccinations ===
Across several appearances in 2021, Parsons argued for COVID-19 vaccines. Debating on shows such as Good Morning Britain and GB News, Parsons strongly supported schemes that encouraged vaccinations against the virus.

=== National service ===
During a Good Morning Britain debate on 25 January 2024, Parsons advocated for the return of national service after General Sir Patrick Sanders said Britain should train a "citizen army." Parsons' views garnered over five million views on X (Twitter) and millions more across other social media platforms.

== Filmography ==
=== Television ===
Year	Title	Notes	Ref.
2019	The Apprentice	Contestant; Series 15	
2020	The Apprentice Best Bits	Contestant; Special	
2019–present	Various shows (TalkRadio & TalkTV)	Regular contributor	
2020–present	Good Morning Britain	Regular contributor	
2021	Celebrity Eating with My Ex (BBC Three)	Participant; Series 3	
2021–present	Various shows (GB News)	Regular contributor	
2022	Celebs Go Dating	Participant; Series 10	
2022	Celebrity Hot Property (BBC Three)	Participant; Series 3	
2023	More than Daffs and Taffs (S4C)	Participant; Series 1	
2023	Celebs Go Dating	Participant; Series 12	
2024–2025	Breakfast with Kay Burley (Sky News)	Regular contributor	

=== Digital ===
Year	Title	Notes	Ref.
2021	Off The Table (ITV)	Participant; Series 1	
2022	Street Dating with boohooMAN	Presenter; Series 1	
2022	Love & Relationships (Channel 4)	Presenter; Short Series	
2023	Davide vs. with boohooMAN	Participant; Series 1	

=== Theatre ===
Year	Title	Role	Theatre	Location	Ref.
2023	Tony n' Tina's Wedding	Joey Vitale	ArcelorMittal Orbit	London	

=== Guest appearances ===
- The Apprentice: You're Fired! (20 November 2019, 18 December 2019)
- Married at First Sight: One Year On (29 August 2022)
- Sunday Morning Live (13 August 2023)
- Newsnight (25 November 2024)

== Charity ==
In December 2020, Parsons switched on the Christmas lights for the London Borough of Bromley, raising money for children's charity Go Beyond. He said, "I’m really looking forward to helping Bromley get festive and raising money for this brilliant cause".

It was announced on 28 June 2021, Parsons would become Go Beyond's patron, joining the likes of Kate Winslet, Jennifer Saunders and Alan Titchmarsh.

== Publications ==
- Daily Star (2020—2023)
- Daily Express (2024—present)
- The Daily Telegraph (2026—present)
