= The Dark Side of Married at First Sight =

- Panorama episode
- Episode no.: Series 74; Episode 17
- Presented by: Noor Nanji
- Editing by: Karen Wightman
- Original air date: 18 May 2026
- Running time: 29 minutes

Episode chronology
← Previous "Scams, Lies and AI"	Next → —

"The Dark Side of Married at First Sight" is an episode of the BBC current affairs programme Panorama that aired on 18 May 2026. Presented by Noor Nanji, it features three female cast members of the reality television show Married at First Sight UK detailing their allegations of rape and sexual misconduct.

== Reception ==
Since the documentary aired, Channel 4 removed all episodes of Married at First Sight UK from its video on demand service. The travel company Tui also ended its sponsorship of the series.

In July 2026, the Metropolitan Police said an unnamed MAFS UK star was arrested and bailed on suspicion of rape, adding it "relates to an ongoing investigation".

On 5 November 2026, Channel 4 announced that it had cancelled the programme and said it would reinvest its budget in "distinctive new programming". Its chief executive Priya Dogra also apologised to the women involved in the Panorama investigation for "the distress they have clearly felt".
