= Jay Howard (TV personality) =

British disability advocate

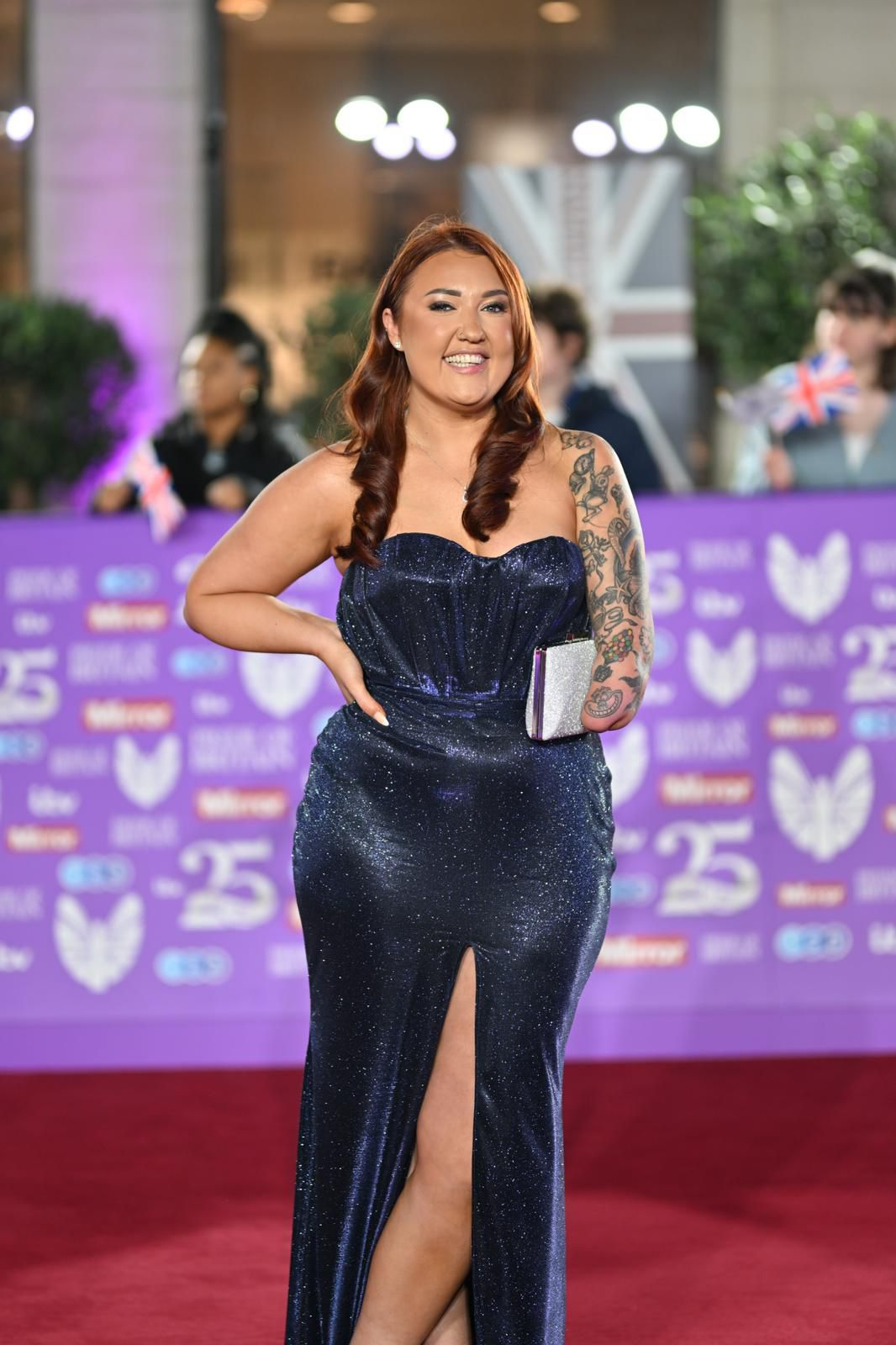
- Born: September 29, 1991 (age 34)
- Citizenship: British
- Occupations: Disability advocate, TV personality and presenter

Jay Howard is a British disability advocate and TV personality, best known for appearing on Channel 4 dating series Married At First Sight UK in 2023 and on the ITV panel series Unfiltered Women in 2024. Howard was the first disabled cast member to appear on Married At First Sight.

== Career ==
In 2024, Howard joined the first disability-led female panel show for a major UK broadcaster. Featuring alongside two other disabled public figures, the trio explored topics including dating with a disability, public attitudes towards the disabled community and travelling as a disabled person. She received an award at the Power of Women 2024 in recognition of her disability advocacy work. She also joined the Pride of Britain judging panel for their Regional Fundraiser of the Year 2024.

Howard partnered with Channel 4 for the Paris 2024 Paralympics and interviewed Strictly Come Dancing champion Chris McCausland for the channel's Alternative Christmas message.

Howard is a disability advocate and a charity ambassador for Reach, a UK limb difference charity. She is also a guest speaker sharing her lived experiences as someone with a physical disability.
