= Nadia Essex =

English media personality (born 1981)

- Born: Nadia Christina Samantha Essex; 16 December 1981 (age 44); Sutton, Greater London, England
- Other name: Lady Nadia Essex
- Occupations: Studio manager, businesswoman, dating coach, television personality
- Years active: 2008–present
- Television: Celebs Go Dating (2016–2018)
- Children: 1

Nadia Essex (born 16 December 1981) is an English television personality and dating expert. She is best known for appearing as a dating coach on the reality series Celebs Go Dating from 2016 until her departure in 2018, which followed reports that she had created anonymous social media accounts.

== Early life ==
Nadia Christina Samantha Essex was born in Sutton, Greater London, England on 16 December 1981, as the only daughter to Douglas John Essex (born 1955), a carpet fitter, and his wife, Nadia J (née Hyde; born 1958), a housewife. She has two brothers, James Douglas Samual Essex (born 1979) and Arran David Essex (born 1986). She grew up in Epsom, a market town in Surrey, and attended Rosebery School for Girls. Her parents later divorced, and, in 2000, her father married Jane V Bulman (née Hallpike; born 1955).

== Career ==
Essex first appeared on television as a dating expert on Celebs Go Dating when the programme launched in 2016, alongside Eden Blackman and later Paul Carrick Brunson.

Outside of Celebs Go Dating, she has appeared on programmes including Loose Women.

In 2019, Essex launched a mobile app called Kidfluence, which was described in the press as a platform aimed at helping parents manage their children’s involvement in social media and online brand promotion. In April 2024, she was appointed a director of Kidfluence Ltd, the company behind the app.

She was also a director of New Image London Limited, incorporated in 2008 and dissolved in 2010, of IRL Agency Ltd, incorporated in 2015 and dissolved in 2019, and of Safely Ltd, incorporated in 2019 and dissolved in 2021.

== Personal life ==
Essex was the subject of a death hoax in September 2017.

In 2021, she revealed that she has been permanently banned from the dating social media networks, Tinder and Hinge.

In September 2019, Essex announced that she was 14 weeks pregnant with her first child. She said that is no longer with the baby's father, who lives in the United States, but hopes to co-parent their child. She described her child as a 'miracle baby'. The following month, she revealed that she was expecting a baby boy. She gave birth to her son in March 2020, whom she named Ezekiel Michael Essex.

=== Harassment and legal action ===
In 2018, Essex was suspended from Celebs Go Dating for trolling her former co-host Eden Blackman on social media. She was removed from the show midway through filming of the fifth series in September 2018, reportedly due to "improper use of social media". Lime Pictures issued a statement confirming her suspension, saying she was "found to be setting up fake accounts to troll certain users – which is something that won't be tolerated". Despite admitting to setting up several trolling Twitter accounts, she subsequently started legal proceedings against Blackman and Lime Pictures; her case against Blackman was thrown out of court. In a 2020 interview, Blackman said he had issued legal harassment proceedings against Essex, and in return had obtained a signed agreement that she would cease all harassment of him online and in the press.

In October 2025, Byline Times reported that Essex said she had raised concerns with production company Lime Pictures in 2017 about alleged inappropriate behaviour by her Celebs Go Dating co-presenter, Eden Blackman, towards women. According to the report, Lime Pictures investigated her concerns and both presenters subsequently entered mediation, after which Essex’s contract was renewed. In 2018, the production company’s lawyers said Essex had given written assurances that she was not connected to anonymous Twitter (now X) accounts that had posted critical comments about Blackman; she later admitted to running the accounts, was suspended, and resigned soon after. Essex signed an undertaking agreeing to remove negative posts and not engage in harassment against Blackman, later saying she had made “errors of judgment” but was motivated by what she believed were safeguarding concerns. She subsequently attempted to bring an employment-tribunal case for sexual discrimination against Lime Pictures and Blackman, which was ruled out of time.

== Filmography ==
Year	Title	Notes
2013	First Dates	1 episode
2014–2015, 2018	This Morning	3 episodes
2016–2018	Celebs Go Dating	Series regular; series 1–5
2017–2018	Good Morning Britain	3 episodes
2018	Loose Women	1 episode
2018	The Independent Republic	1 episode
2018	Celebrity Ghost Hunt	3 episodes
2019	Celebrity Coach Trip	2 episodes
2019	Live Debate: Are Our Politicians Up to the Job?	Television special
2022	Friday Night Feast	1 episode
2022	Tonight LIVE with Mark Dolan	6 episodes
2022	Real Britain with Darren Grimes	1 episode

== Bibliography ==
- Essex, Nadia (2021). 101 Tips for Dating After A Pandemic. Independently published. ISBN 9798500951038.
