= Nicole Bass (television personality) =

English television personality

- Born: October 20, 1991 (age 34); Essex, England
- Occupation: Television personality
- Years active: 2015–present
- Television: The Only Way Is Essex; Ex on the Beach

Nicole Bass (born 1991) is an English television personality, known for appearing in the ITVBe reality series The Only Way Is Essex. In 2017, she appeared in the sixth series of Ex on the Beach.

== Career ==
Bass is a qualified personal trainer. She qualified with Focus Fitness UK in 2019. In October 2015, Nicole joined the cast of the ITVBe reality television series The Only Way is Essex for the sixteenth series. In January 2017, she appeared in the sixth series of Ex on the Beach. In 2019, she was a contestant on MTV's The Challenge. In 2020, it was announced that Bass has rejoined The Only Way Is Essex for the twenty-sixth series.

== Filmography ==
Year	Title	Note
2015–16, 2020–21	The Only Way Is Essex	Cast member
2017	Ex on the Beach	Ex of Josh Ritchie
2019	The Challenge: War of the Worlds 2	Contestant
