= Ella Morgan (television personality) =

English TV presenter, model and campaigner

- Born: Bristol, England
- Other name: Ella-Morgan
- Occupations: Television personality; presenter; model; campaigner
- Years active: 2023–present

Ella Morgan Clark is an English television personality, presenter, model and campaigner. She was the first openly transgender bride on the E4 reality series Married at First Sight (2023). She has since appeared on Celebs Go Dating (2024).

== Early life ==
Clark was born in Bristol to parents Amanda and Chris and grew up in Portishead, Somerset. She has three brothers.

== Career ==
Clark began her career working as a cosmetic surgery consultant and surgical assistant. Upon applying, she was accepted to star as a bride in series 8 of the E4 reality dating series Married at First Sight. Paired with Nathanial Valentino, who was informed in advance with Clark's consent, she came out to her co-stars as transgender in an episode of the series, the first bride in the franchise to do so. Clark paired with JJ Slater later in the series.

In October 2023, Clark signed her first modeling contract with PrettyLittleThing. She revealed her intention to become a presenter; she had her first gig introducing Girls Aloud at the 2024 Brighton Pride. Clark landed her first television live broadcast presenting gig as a main presenter for London Pride 2025 alongside co host Richie Anderson and Michael Gunning.

In 2024, Clark was cast in Celebs Go Dating, also on Channel 4, in which she was paired with Alex James Ali. The pair continued to date for a few months after their tenure on the series ended before splitting at the end of the year. Also that December, Clark was a special guest in the Brighton performances of the pantomime Snow White and the Seven Drag Queens, which also featured Scarlett Moffatt, David Potts, Michael Marouli and Tomara Thomas.

Representing MUA Academy, Clark became the first trans celebrity to represent Superdrug in 2025, fronting a major campaign for the high-street beauty retailer. She featured at a number of Pride events, including as part of Katie Price's set in Portsmouth.

== Personal life ==
Clark came out to her family when she was 18, though she had known from a young age and been bullied in school. She also opened up on Paul Brunson's podcast about her struggles with bulimia, suicide and sexual assault. As of 2023, she lived with her grandmother in Weston-super-Mare.
