= Celebs Go Dating =

British dating reality series

- Genre: Dating; Reality
- Starring: Eden Blackman; Nadia Essex; Tom Read Wilson; Paul Carrick Brunson; Anna Williamson; Dr Tara Suwinyattichaiporn
- Narrated by: Rob Beckett
- Country of origin: United Kingdom
- Original language: English
- No. of series: 14
- No. of episodes: 259

Production
- Executive producers: Kalpna Patel-Knight; Phil Harris; Sharon Powers
- Editors: Justin Saculles; Lyndon Tovey; Nick Walker
- Camera setup: Multi camera
- Running time: 60 minutes (inc. adverts)
- Production companies: Lime Pictures (series 1–14); Objective Entertainment (series 15–)

Original release
- Network: E4
- Release: 29 August 2016 – present

Celebs Go Dating is a British dating reality series. It began broadcasting on 29 August 2016 on E4, with the first series having 15 episodes. Paul Carrick Brunson, Anna Williamson and Dr Tara Suwinyattichaiporn appear as the dating agents, with Tom Read Wilson as a client coordinator. Rob Beckett narrates the series. Following the conclusion of the eighth series, two special editions of Celebs Go Dating were commissioned due to the impact of the COVID-19 pandemic on television: Celebs Go Virtual Dating and Celebs Go Dating: The Mansion. The series has since resumed its regular format.

== Development and production ==
It was announced in March 2016 that E4 had commissioned a new reality dating series which sees celebrities go on dates with members of the public. Filming for the first series started in August 2016, with the programme premiering later that month. The first series was made up of 15 episodes, airing every weekday. In 2017, a second and third series was confirmed to air in early and late 2017, with 20 episodes per series. Series two saw the return of Joey Essex who broke the rules in the first series when he started dating a celebrity on the series. During the filming of series two, Stephen Bear brought many problems to the dating agency, breaking the rules of the show by dating another celebrity outside of the series; this led to his removal from the programme.

It was announced on the official Celebs Go Dating Twitter account that the third series of the show will feature same-sex relationships for the first time. In September 2017, it was confirmed that the series would return for a fourth series in 2018. The fourth series also features same-sex relationships. The series was renewed for a fifth and sixth series in 2018. In 2019, the Celebs Go Dating was renewed for a seventh and eighth series. In June 2020, it was announced that due to the COVID-19 pandemic, the programme would return with a special series titled Celebs Go Virtual Dating. With five 30-minute episodes, the series began airing on 27 July 2020. The ninth series of Celebs Go Dating aired in early 2022.

In September 2024, when producer Lime Pictures shuttered its London production office, Objective Media Group under its unscripted entertainment label Objective Entertainment had taken over Lime Pictures' reality state including Celebs Go Dating with Objecitve Entertainment would produce future series.

== Broadcast ==
The first and second series of Celebs Go Dating aired every weeknight on E4 with a repeat at the weekend on Sunday morning. The third series was due to end on 29 September 2017, however an episode that was due to be aired on 15 September 2017 did not air, seemingly pulled from broadcast moments before its scheduled starting time. The show's social media accounts even posted the trailer for the evening's episode hours before airing. An E4 spokesman cited "editorial reasons" and said the show would return the following week. In the fourth series, Celebs Go Dating began to air during the week and weekend, but there was no episode on Fridays or Saturdays. The Celebs Go Virtual Dating series was aired weekly on Monday evenings, marking it as the first time the programme had been transmitted weekly.

== Series overview and cast ==
Series	Episodes	First aired	Last aired
1	15	29 August 2016	16 September 2016
2	20	13 February 2017	10 March 2017
3	19	4 September 2017	29 September 2017
4	20	4 February 2018	1 March 2018
5	20	14 October 2018	8 November 2018
6	20	24 February 2019	21 March 2019
7	20	5 August 2019	29 August 2019
8	20	24 February 2020	19 March 2020
VD	5	27 July 2020	24 August 2020
9 (TM)	20	25 January 2021	19 February 2021
10	20	17 January 2022	17 February 2022
11	20	28 November 2022	23 December 2022
12	20	20 August 2023	14 September 2023
13	20	19 August 2024	19 September 2024
14	20	11 August 2025	11 September 2025
15	20	4 May 2026	29 May 2026

=== Series 1 (2016) ===
The first series of the show was confirmed in March 2016 and began airing on 29 August 2016. It concluded after fifteen episodes on 16 September 2016. Shortly after the first series, it was announced that E4 had commissioned a further two series to air in 2017. The following is a list of celebrities who appeared in the first series.

Celebrity	Notability
Paisley Billings	Tattoo Fixers star
Charlotte Crosby	Former Geordie Shore cast member
Tyger Drew-Honey	Outnumbered actor
Joey Essex	Former The Only Way Is Essex cast member
Jack Jones	YouTuber
Stephanie Pratt	Television personality

=== Series 2 (2017) ===
The second series of the show was confirmed on 7 November 2016, and began on 13 February 2017. It concluded after twenty episodes on 10 March 2017. Along with the announcement of the cast for the series, it was confirmed that Joey Essex would be returning, having previously appeared in the first series. Stephen Bear was also removed from the series during the eighteenth episode for breaking the show rules by dating a celebrity outside of the agency. The following is a list of celebrities who appeared in the second series.

Celebrity	Notability
Stephen Bear	Television personality
Jonathan Cheban	Keeping Up with the Kardashians star
Joey Essex	Former The Only Way Is Essex cast member
Perri Kiely	Diversity member
Ferne McCann	Former The Only Way Is Essex cast member
Jorgie Porter	Hollyoaks actress
Melody Thornton	The Pussycat Dolls member

=== Series 3 (2017) ===
The third series of the show was confirmed on 7 November 2016 along with the announcement of the second series, and began airing on 4 September 2017. It concluded after nineteen episodes on 29 September 2017. Bobby Cole Norris also became the first gay cast member to take part in the series. The following is a list of celebrities who appeared in the third series.

Celebrity	Notability
James Argent	The Only Way Is Essex cast member
Calum Best	Model & television personality
Bobby Cole Norris	The Only Way Is Essex cast member
Sarah-Jane Crawford	Television presenter
Charlotte Dawson	Ex on the Beach cast member
Frankie Cocozza	Singer & The X Factor contestant
Courtney Stodden	Media personality
Georgia Toffolo	Made in Chelsea cast member

=== Series 4 (2018) ===
The fourth series of the show was confirmed on 28 September 2017, and began airing on 4 February 2018. It was the first series to have aired at the weekends, however there was no episode on Fridays or Saturdays. The following is a list of celebrities who appeared in the fourth series.

Celebrity	Notability
Gemma Collins	The Only Way Is Essex cast member
London Hughes	Television presenter
Jade Jones	Taekwondo athlete
Jonathan Lipnicki	Actor
Ollie Locke	Made in Chelsea cast member
Seb Morris	Racing driver
Tallia Storm	Singer
Mike Thalassitis	Love Island contestant
Sam Thompson	Made in Chelsea cast member

=== Series 5 (2018) ===
The following is a list of celebrities who appeared in the fifth series, which was broadcast from 14 October 2018 to 8 November 2018.

Celebrity	Notability
Alik Alfus	Former Made in Chelsea cast member
Olivia Attwood	Love Island contestant
Eyal Booker	Love Island contestant
Mutya Buena	Sugababes singer
Sam Craske	Diversity member
Callum Izzard	Ibiza Weekender cast member
Vas J Morgan	Former The Only Way Is Essex cast member
Chloe Sims	The Only Way Is Essex cast member
Amy Tapper	Gogglebox star

=== Series 6 (2019) ===
The following is a list of celebrities appeared in the sixth series, which was broadcast from 24 February 2019 to 21 March 2019.

Celebrity	Notability
Jack Fowler	Love Island contestant
Chelsee Healey	Waterloo Road & Hollyoaks actress
Kerry Katona	Atomic Kitten singer & media personality
Megan McKenna	Television personality & singer
David Potts	Ibiza Weekender cast member
Georgia Steel	Love Island contestant
Sam Thompson	Made in Chelsea cast member
Pete Wicks	The Only Way Is Essex cast member

=== Series 7 (2019) ===
For the first time in Celebs Go Dating, the series will feature couples, with Charlotte Crosby and Josh Ritchie receiving couples therapy as well as Jermaine Pennant and his wife Alice Goodwin. Katie Price and boyfriend Kris Boyson were initially revealed as part of the show in the cast announcement but due to conflict of interest on Price's behalf, they didn't appear on the series. The following is a list of celebrities appeared in the seventh series, which was broadcast from 5 to 29 August 2019.

Celebrity	Notability
Megan Barton Hanson	Love Island contestant
Lady Colin Campbell	Royal biographer & socialite
Jack Fincham	Love Island contestant
Lauren Goodger	Former The Only Way Is Essex cast member
Nathan Henry	Geordie Shore cast member
Lee Ryan	Blue singer & actor
Chloe Sims	The Only Way Is Essex cast member
Demi Sims	The Only Way Is Essex cast member
Couples
Charlotte Crosby; Josh Ritchie	Television personalities
Katie Price; Kris Boyson (Note: Scenes with Price and Boyson were removed from the series due to a conflict of interest.)	Media personality; personal trainer
Jermaine Pennant; Alice Goodwin	Footballer; Model

=== Series 8 (2020) ===
The eighth series, along with the line-up, was announced on 20 November 2019. The series aired from 24 February 2020 to 19 March 2020. Midway through the series, Charlotte Dawson and Matt Sarsfield joined for couples therapy.

Celebrity	Notability
Olivia Bentley	Made in Chelsea cast member
Amy Childs	Former The Only Way Is Essex cast member
Dean Gaffney	Former EastEnders actor
Alison Hammond	This Morning reporter
Amy Hart	Love Island contestant
James "Lockie" Lock	The Only Way Is Essex cast member
Josh Ritchie	Love Island contestant
Malique Thompson-Dwyer	Hollyoaks actor
Couples
Charlotte Dawson; Matt Sarsfield	Ex on the Beach cast member; Rugby player

=== Special - Celebs Go Virtual Dating (2020) ===
E4 announced that due to the COVID-19 pandemic, they would air a socially distanced series, titled Celebs Go Virtual Dating. The lineup for the series was announced on 15 July 2020. The series consists of five 30-minute episodes that began airing from 27 July 2020. The series was aired weekly.

Celebrity	Notability
Levi Davis	Rugby union player
Chloe Ferry	Geordie Shore cast member
Shaughna Phillips	Love Island contestant
Pete Wicks	The Only Way Is Essex cast member

=== Series 9 - Celebs Go Dating: The Mansion (2021) ===
Celebs Go Dating: The Mansion was announced on 25 November 2020, alongside the lineup. Unlike prior series, it was announced that the celebrities would be cohabiting together. The premiere date was later confirmed to be 25 January 2021.

Celebrity	Notability
Joey Essex	The Only Way Is Essex cast member
Chloe Ferry	Geordie Shore cast member
Kimberly Hart-Simpson	Actress
Sophie Hermann	Made in Chelsea cast member
Wayne Lineker	Businessman & brother of footballer Gary Lineker
Curtis Pritchard	Love Island contestant
Tom Zanetti	DJ & music producer
Karim Zeroual	CBBC presenter & actor

=== Series 10 (2022) ===
The tenth series was announced on 27 October 2021. The series launched in January 2022. According to dating agent Anna Williamson, Ryan-Mark Parsons received the worst score in Celebs Go Dating history and was put on hold from further dates.

Celebrity	Notability
Abz Love	Five singer & rapper
Chloe Brockett	The Only Way Is Essex cast member
Nikita Jasmine	Married at First Sight contestant
Ulrika Jonsson	Television presenter & model
Jessika Power	Married at First Sight Australia contestant
Marty McKenna	Geordie Shore cast member
Miles Nazaire	Made in Chelsea cast member
Ryan-Mark Parsons	The Apprentice contestant

=== Series 11 (2022) ===
The eleventh series was confirmed in August 2022 after cast members were spotted and photographed filming for the series. Love Island cast member Laura Anderson was scouted for the series "hours after" the end of her four-year long relationship with Dane Bowers.

Celebrity	Notability
Laura Anderson	Love Island contestant
Cecilie Fjellhøy	The Tinder Swindler cast member
Bethan Kershaw	Geordie Shore cast member
Gary Lucy	Hollyoaks actor
Sinitta	Singer & television personality
Navid Sole	The Apprentice contestant
Pete Wicks	The Only Way Is Essex cast member
Liam Reardon	Love Island contestant

=== Series 12 (2023) ===
The twelfth series was confirmed in June 2023 and the celebrities were announced thereafter.

Celebrity	Notability
Adam Collard	Love Island contestant
Chloe Burrows	Love Island contestant
Mark-Francis Vandelli	Made in Chelsea cast member
Lottie Moss	Model
Spuddz	Comedian & internet personality
Vanessa Feltz	Television & radio presenter

=== Series 13 (2024) ===
The thirteenth series was confirmed in March 2024 and the celebrities were announced thereafter.

Celebrity	Notability
Chris Taylor	Love Island contestant
Helen Flanagan	Former Coronation Street actress
Ella Morgan	Married at First Sight cast member
Jamelia	Singer & Hollyoaks actress
Stephen Webb	Former Gogglebox cast member
Lauryn Goodman	Social media influencer
Tristan Phipps	Made in Chelsea cast member

=== Series 14 (2025) ===
The fourteenth series was confirmed in April 2025 and the celebrities were announced thereafter. Christine McGuinness left before filming had finished because of personal reasons.

Celebrity	Notability
Mark Labbett	The Chase quizzer
Jon Lee	S Club singer & actor
Olivia Hawkins	Love Island contestant
Kerry Katona	Atomic Kitten singer & media personality
Christine McGuinness	Television personality & model
Sam Prince	Made In Chelsea cast member
Donna Preston	Actress & comedian
Louis Russell	Television personality

=== Series 15 (2026) ===
The cast for the fifteenth series was announced on 21 January 2026.

Celebrity	Notability
Coleen Nolan	Singer & Loose Women panellist
David Potts	Television personality
Gabby Allen	Television personality
James Haskell	Former England rugby player
Lucinda Light	Married at First Sight Australia star
PK Humble	Content Creator
Professor Green	Rapper

== Agents, psychologists and presenters ==
Cast member	Role	Series														
Cast member	Role	1	2	3	4	5	6	7	8	VD	TM	11	12	13	14	15
Eden Blackman	Dating agent (series 1–4)															
Nadia Essex	Dating agent (series 1–5)															
Paul Carrick Brunson	Dating agent (series 5–present)															
Anna Williamson	Dating agent (series 6–present)															
Dr Tara Suwinyattichaiporn	Dating agent (series 12–present)															
Tom Read Wilson	Receptionist (series 1–3); Junior client coordinator (series 4–TM); Senior client coordinator (series 11–present)															
Rob Beckett	Narrator															
Joey Essex	Online presenter															
Dr Pam Spurr	Psychologist															
Judi James	Psychologist															

= Agent/psychologist/presenter is a main cast member
= Agent/psychologist/presenter is a recurring cast member
= Agent/psychologist/presenter does not feature in this series
= Presenter was a cast member in this series
= Narrator features in this series

== Reception ==
The series regularly attracted audiences of over one million viewers in its early runs on E4, but ratings declined in later years.

Critical responses to the format have been mixed. A review in The Guardian described the show as “fizzy and fun, but ultimately shallow,” while also noting its popularity with younger viewers.

== Controversies ==
The programme has occasionally been the subject of regulatory complaints. In August 2019, Ofcom received complaints about episodes of Celebs Go Dating concerning race discrimination and sexual orientation discrimination.

Also in 2018, dating agent Nadia Essex was suspended from the show after it emerged that she had used anonymous social media accounts to post critical comments about other individuals involved in production.
