= Vas J Morgan =

English television personality and magazine editor

- Born: Savvas Morgan; 3 December 1988 (age 36); London, England
- Occupations: Television personality; magazine editor
- Years active: 2010–present
- Television: The Only Way Is Essex (2014–2018); Celebs Go Dating (2018)
- Website: tingsmagazine.com

Savvas Morgan (born 3 December 1988), known professionally as Vas J Morgan, is an English television personality, magazine editor and activist. He is known as a former cast member of the ITVBe BAFTA Award winning reality series The Only Way Is Essex.

== Career ==
=== Magazine editor ===
Morgan started his career as a blogger, and in 2010, he launched a celebrity gossip website, which ran for 7 years until he closed it down to focus on his fashion magazine, Tings. The first issue came out in 2017 and had Sofia Richie on its cover.

=== Television ===
In 2014, Morgan joined the cast of The Only Way Is Essex, an ITVBe reality television series. Morgan left the series at the end of the 19th series, and made a guest appearance during the 21st series.

In August 2018, Morgan participated in the fifth series of E4 dating series Celebs Go Dating.

=== Activism ===
In March 2020, Morgan launched the WE MATTER platform to allow a safe space for people to discuss mental health issues without judgement and stigma.

Following the murder of George Floyd, Morgan used his platform to raise over £50,000 to provide free mental health support to black communities.

== Personal life ==
Morgan is from London, England. He has an older brother and two older sisters. Morgan currently lives in Essex, England.

== Filmography ==
As himself
| Year | Title | Notes |
|---|---|---|
| 2014–2019 | The Only Way Is Essex | Series regular |
| 2018 | Celebs Go Dating | Series 5; main cast |
