= Olivia Attwood =

English television presenter and model (born 1991)

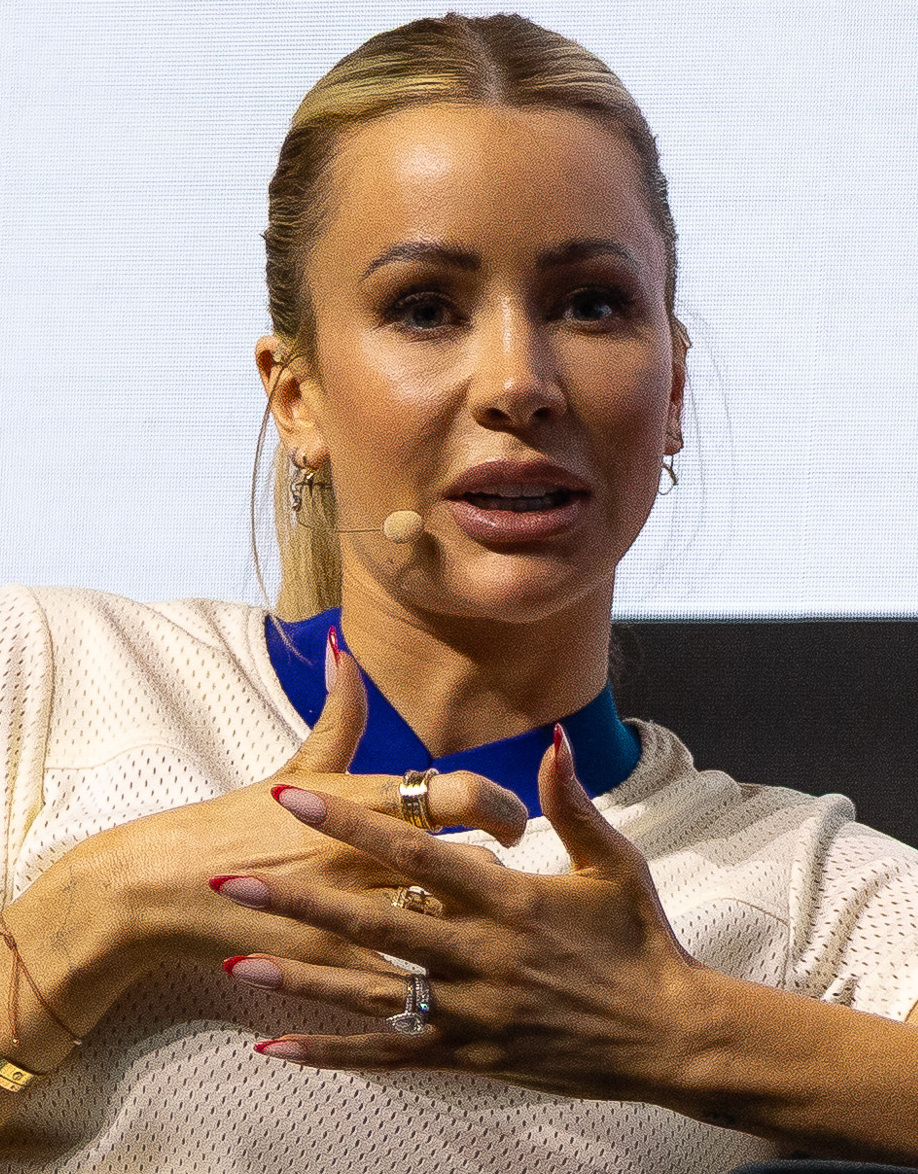
- Attwood in 2025
- Born: Olivia Jade Attwood; 2 May 1991 (age 35); London, England
- Occupations: Television personality; presenter; model
- Years active: 2017–present
- Television: Love Island; I'm a Celebrity...Get Me Out of Here!; The Only Way Is Essex; Olivia Meets Her Match; Olivia Attwood: Getting Filthy Rich; Olivia Attwood: Bad Boyfriends; Loose Women; This Morning
- Partner(s): Bradley Dack (2019–2026); Pete Wicks (2026–present)

YouTube information
- Channel: Olivia's House with Olivia Attwood
- Years active: 2024–present
- Genre: Podcast
- Subscribers: 82.3 thousand
- Views: 10.8 million
- Last updated: February 12, 2026

Olivia Jade Attwood (born 2 May 1991) is an English television personality, presenter and model. In 2017, she appeared on the third series of Love Island, and later became a regular cast member on the ITVBe reality series The Only Way Is Essex. In November 2022, she participated in the twenty-second series of I'm a Celebrity...Get Me Out of Here! but withdrew on medical grounds two days after arriving. In 2023, Attwood joined Loose Women as a panellist.

== Early life ==
Attwood was born on 2 May 1991 in London to Jennifer and Kai Attwood. She has two younger siblings, a sister, Georgia, and a brother, Max. Her younger years were spent living in London, Surrey, England and Alberta, Canada for five years. She attended Tormead School and Cranleigh School.

== Career ==
Attwood began her career as a model and a motorsport grid girl. In 2017, she became a contestant on the third series of the ITV2 reality dating show Love Island. Along with Chris Hughes, she reached the final and the pair finished in third place. The following year, Attwood and Hughes starred in their own spin-off series Chris & Olivia: Crackin' On.

In 2018, Attwood appeared on series five of Celebs Go Dating. Attwood reportedly lied about being single in order to appear on the show. However, she denied the claims. In 2019, Attwood joined the cast of The Only Way Is Essex for its twenty-fourth series. She appeared in 16 episodes before leaving at the end of series 26 in 2020.

In 2020, Attwood began starring in her own reality series on ITVBe titled Olivia Meets Her Match, which followed her life with footballer Bradley Dack. She and Dack also appeared in ITV's Drama vs. Reality advertisement alongside Anna Friel. In 2021, she appeared on the ITV2 series Celebrity Karaoke Club. She has also made appearances on Lorraine, Tipping Point: Lucky Stars, The Crystal Maze, The Real Housewives of Cheshire and Loose Women.

In 2022, Attwood began presenting documentary series on ITV, the first of which was Olivia Attwood: Getting Filthy Rich, exploring the online adult-content industry. Later in 2022, she appeared in the ITV competition series I'm a Celebrity...Get Me Out of Here!, but withdrew on medical grounds shortly after arriving.

In June 2023, ITV commissioned Olivia Marries Her Match, a four-part reality show focusing on Attwood's and fiancé Bradley Dack's wedding. In August 2023, she became a regular panellist on Loose Women.

In 2024, she fronted Olivia Attwood: The Price of Perfection and hosted Olivia Attwood’s Bad Boyfriends.

In 2025, she began co-hosting the KISS radio show The Sunday Roast alongside Pete Wicks.

In 2026, she began hosting the ITV2 reality series The Heat.

== Personal life ==
In 2019, she became engaged to footballer Bradley Dack. They were reported to have married on 3 June 2023. The couple separated in January 2026, revealing that they were never legally married, as the hotel where the ceremony took place did not have a licence to carry out weddings and an appointment to complete the required paperwork at a registry office was cancelled. Since 2026, she has been in a relationship with television personality Pete Wicks.

== Filmography ==
As herself
Year	Title	Notes
2017	Love Island	Contestant; series 3
2018	Chris & Olivia: Crackin' On	Lead role
2018	Celebs Go Dating	Main role
2019–2020	The Only Way Is Essex	Regular role; series 25–26
2020–2022	Olivia Meets Her Match	Lead role
2022–present	Olivia Attwood: Getting Filthy Rich	Presenter; documentary series
2022	I'm a Celebrity...Get Me Out of Here!	Contestant; series 22
2022	The Games	Contestant; 11th place
2023	Olivia Marries Her Match	Lead role
2023	Olivia Attwood vs The Trolls	Presenter
2023–present	Loose Women	Regular panellist
2024–present	Olivia Attwood: The Price of Perfection	Presenter
2024–present	Olivia Attwood’s Bad Boyfriends	Presenter
2025–present	This Morning	Relief presenter
2026	The Heat	Host
2026	Celebrity Sabotage	One episode

== See also ==
- List of I'm a Celebrity...Get Me Out of Here! (British TV series) contestants
- List of Love Island (2015 TV series) contestants
