= Married at First Sight (British TV series) =

Reality television series

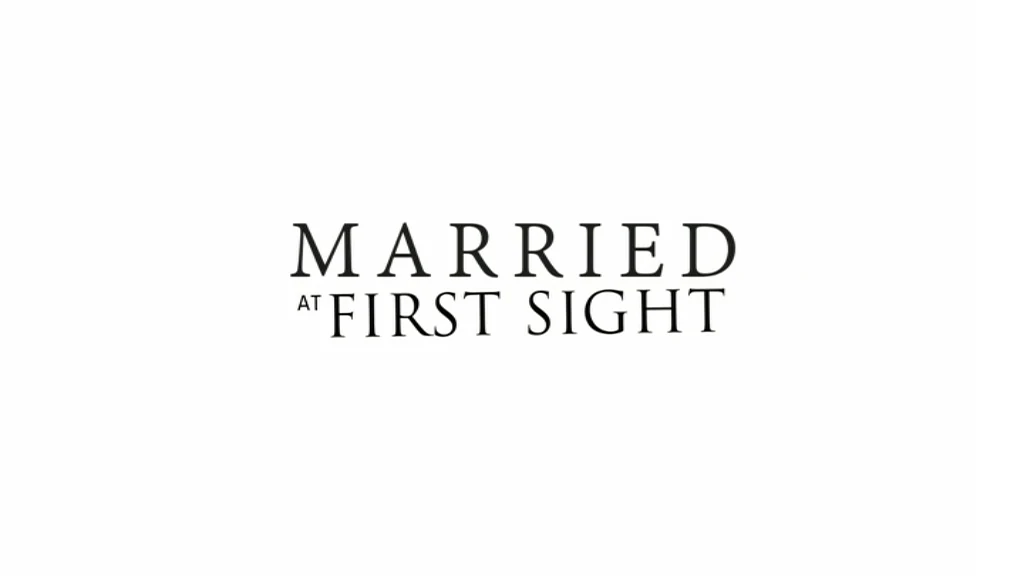
- Genre: Reality television
- Created by: Michael Von Würden
- Based on: Gift Ved Første Blik (Danish TV series)
- Country of origin: United Kingdom
- Original language: English
- No. of series: 10

Production
- Production company: CPL Productions

Original release
- Network: Channel 4 (2015–2020); E4 (2021–2025)
- Release: 9 July 2015 – 14 November 2025

Related
- Married at First Sight

Married at First Sight was a British reality television programme where strangers start a marriage-like relationship with each other, meeting only minutes before the ceremony and then going on honeymoon. Upon returning, they live together for a period of time, during which they meet at commitment ceremonies and choose whether or not they will continue their relationship. On 14 March 2021, Owen and Michelle from the fifth series became the first couple to celebrate their 1st wedding anniversary together.

The programme was the British version of the Married at First Sight franchise which originated in Denmark in 2013.

On 24 November 2020, it was announced that the programme would move to Channel 4's sister channel E4 in 2021, and would use the format of its Australian counterpart following the highly successful broadcast of the latter on E4.

In May 2026, the programme was the subject of a Panorama episode titled The Dark Side of Married at First Sight, after two of the female contestants on the show alleged that they were the victims of rape, with a third alleging a non-consensual act. Episodes of the show were subsequently removed from Channel 4's streaming platforms, with its international counterparts continuing to air. On 5 November 2026, Channel 4 announced that it had cancelled the show and that it would reinvest its budget in "distinctive new programming".

== Series 1 (2015) ==
First aired in July 2015. The couples were:

#	Couple	Age	Occupation	Final decision	Current status
1	Emma Rathbone	32	Businesswoman	Yes	Divorced
1	James Ord-Hume	33	University administrator	Yes	Divorced
2	Sam McDonald	30	Chartered surveyor	Did not marry	N/A
2	Jack Finn-Kelcey	29	Security consultant	Did not marry	N/A
3	Kate Stewart	31	Personal trainer	No	Annulled
3	Jason Knowles	34	Financial adviser	No	Annulled

== Series 2 (2016) ==
First aired in October and November 2016. The couples were:

#	Couple	Age	Occupation	Final decision	Current status
1	Lucie	27	Marketing executive	Yes	Divorced
1	Steven Griffiths	30	Writer	Yes	Divorced
2	Sara	30	Personal assistant	Yes	Divorced
2	Adam	32	Trainee counsellor	Yes	Divorced
3	Caroline	28	Operations coordinator	Yes	Divorced
3	Adam Donoghue	34	Train manager	Yes	Divorced
4	Melissa	27	Student nurse	Yes	Divorced
4	Clark Sherwood	26	Business development manager	Yes	Divorced

== Series 3 (2018) ==
First aired in February and March 2018. The couples were:

#	Couple	Age	Occupation	Final decision	Current status
1	Richard	28	Police sergeant	No	Divorced
1	Harriet	32	Financial director	No	Divorced
2	Ben Jardine	36	Property	Yes	Separated
2	Stephanie	32	Police officer	Yes	Separated
3	Wayne	31	Insurance broker	Did not marry	N/A
3	Carrie	35	Estate agent	Did not marry	N/A

== Series 4 (2019) ==
First aired in March and April 2019. The couples were:

#	Couple	Age	Occupation	Final decision	Current status
1	Steph	28	Nurse	No	Annulled
1	Jonathan	39	Property manager	No	Annulled
2	Verity	28	Office manager	Yes	Separated
2	Jack	25	IT consultant	Yes	Separated

== Series 5 (2020) ==
First aired in October 2020. The couples were:

#	Couple	Age	Occupation	Final decision	Current status
1	Shareen	47	Events manager	No	Divorced
1	David	54	Wholeseller	No	Divorced
2	Michelle	25	Teacher	Yes	Married with children
2	Owen	31	Global account manager	Yes	Married with children

== Series 6 (2021) ==
After the success of the Australian version, the Australian format was adopted. In Episode 1, two couples (Bob & Megan and Ant & Nikita) were matched and married. In Episode 2, two couples (Matt & Dan and Luke & Morag) were matched and married. In Episode 4, two couples (Josh & Amy and Franky & Marilyse) met and were married. In Episode 5, the final two couples (Adam & Tayah and Jordon & Alexis) met and were married.

This series began on 30 August 2021. The final scheduled for 30 September 2021 was postponed after technical problems prevented it from being shown. The final episode was rescheduled the following day.

=== Ceremony history (2021) ===
Episode:	8	11	14	19/20
Ceremony:	1	2	3	Final decision
Luke	Stay	Stay	Stay	Yes
Morag	Stay	Stay	Stay	Yes
Amy	Stay	Stay	Stay	Yes
Josh	Stay	Stay	Stay	Yes
Adam	Stay	Stay	Stay	Yes
Tayah	Stay	Stay	Stay	Yes
Dan	N/A^{3}	Stay	Stay	Yes
Matt	N/A^{3}	Stay	Stay	Yes
Franky	Stay	Stay	Stay	Yes
Marilyse	Stay	Stay	Stay	Yes
Bob	Stay	Stay	Leave	Left
Megan	Stay	Stay	Leave	Left
Alexis	Leave^{2}	Stay^{4}	Leave	Left
Ant	N/A (Leave)^{1}	Stay^{4}	Leave	Left
Jordon	Leave^{2}	Left		
Nikita	N/A (Leave)^{1}	Removed		
Notes	1, 2, 3	4	none	
Ejected	Nikita	none		
Left	Jordon	none	Alexis & Ant	none
Left	Jordon	none	Bob & Megan	none

This couple left the experiment outside of commitment ceremony.
This couple elected to leave the experiment during the commitment ceremony.
This couple was removed from the experiment by the experts or Production.

- ^1: Due to an altercation off-camera at the first Dinner Party, the Production team removed Nikita from the experiment. As a result, Ant also had to leave.
- ^2: Jordon originally chose to stay in the experiment to pursue an extra-marital romance with Megan, following the two sharing a kiss at the first dinner party. However, he changed his mind during the first commitment ceremony and chose to leave. As a result, Alexis & Jordon left the experiment.
- ^3: Due to a delay with returning from their honeymoon in Mexico, Matt & Dan were unable to attend the first dinner party or commitment ceremony.
- ^4: After forming a romantic connection following the end of their previous marriages, Alexis & Ant were allowed to return to the experiment as a new couple.

=== Couple profiles (2021) ===
No.	Couple	Age	Home	Occupation	Honeymoon	Final Decision	Status
1	Robert Voysey	26	Bournemouth	Business Protection Specialist	Dominican Republic	Broke up before final decision	Separated
1	Megan Wolfe	26	Stoke-on-Trent	Wellness Coach	Dominican Republic	Broke up before final decision	Separated
2	Anthony Poole	28	Manchester	Business Development	Mexico	Removed from experiment	Separated
2	Nikita Jasmine	26	County Durham	Sales	Mexico	Removed from experiment	Separated
3	Matt Jameson	39	Leeds	Charity Worker	Mexico	Yes	Separated
3	Daniel Mckee	27	Northern Ireland	Sales	Mexico	Yes	Separated
4	Luke Dawson	36	Cardiff	Care Home Manager/Fireman	Switzerland	Yes	Separated
4	Morag Crichton	31	Essex	Veterinary Nurse	Switzerland	Yes	Separated
5	Joshua Christie	26	West London	Insurance Worker	Mexico	Yes	Separated
5	Amy Christophers	34	Cornwall	Sports Journalist	Mexico	Yes	Separated
6	Franky Spencer	47	Dubai	Strength & Conditioning Coach	Lake District	Yes	Separated
6	Marilyse Corrigan	36	Beverley	Personal Trainer	Lake District	Yes	Separated
7	Adam Aveling	26	Doncaster	Electrician	Antigua	Yes	Married with children
7	Tayah McCreith	25	Welwyn Garden City	Estate Agent	Antigua	Yes	Married with children
8	Jordon Mundell	27	Cardiff	Personal Trainer	Maldives	Broke up before final decision	Separated
8	Alexis Economou	28	London	Model	Maldives	Broke up before final decision	Separated
9	Anthony Poole	28	Manchester	Business Development	N/A^{1}	Broke up before final decision	Separated
9	Alexis Economou	28	London	Model	N/A^{1}	Broke up before final decision	Separated

- ^1: After forming a romantic connection following the end of their previous marriages, Alexis & Ant were allowed to return to the experiment as a new couple.

=== Viewing figures (2021) ===
Official, 28-day consolidated ratings are taken from BARB and include E4 +1. Catch-up service totals are added to the official ratings.

	Viewers (millions)				
	Week 1	Week 2	Week 3	Week 4	Week 5
Monday	2.42	2.27	2.68	2.75	2.35
Tuesday	2.17	2.37	2.47	2.52	2.47
Wednesday	2.46	2.24	2.51	2.46	2.28
Thursday	2.36	2.41	2.62	2.60	
Friday					1.87 (Note: Technical issues led to the accidental repeat of part of episode 19 during the scheduled Thursday night broadcast of the final. The episode was rescheduled for the following day after efforts to show the correct episode failed.)
Weekly average	2.35	2.32	2.57	2.58	2.24
Running average	2.35	2.34	2.41	2.46	2.41
Series average	2.41				

==== "Afters" specials ====
For this series, a special aftershow was broadcast on Thursdays at 10 pm, after the final Married at First Sight episode of the week.

Episode	Airdate	Guests	UK viewers (millions)
1	2 September 2021	Nick Grimshaw, Suzi Ruffell	0.44
2	9 September 2021	Paul C Brunson, Tom Read Wilson	0.47
3	16 September 2021	Sam Thompson, Tom Read Wilson, Olga Koch	0.43
4	23 September 2021	Joel Dommett, Hannah Cooper-Dommett, Snoochie	0.36
5	1 October 2021 (Note: This episode was delayed as the final was unable to be broadcast in its intended Thursday slot, with the programme rescheduled for the day after. On the intended airdate, First Dates occupied most of its slot as E4 opted to show it as filler.)		0.44

== Series 7 (2022) ==
After the success of the sixth series, an extended thirty-episode version using the same format was commissioned. This time, the cast included two same-sex couples - one male and one female. In each of Episodes 1, 2, 4 & 5, two couples were matched and married. In a franchise first, two additional couples were married and joined the experiment in Episode 12. The series began on 29 August 2022, the first episode being followed by a "One Year Later" special episode with some of Series 6's cast. For this series, the Dinner Parties and Commitment Ceremonies moved from Brighton to Trinity Quay Wharf in London's Docklands.

=== Ceremony history (2022) ===
Episode:	8	11	15	19	24	27/28
Ceremony:	1	2	3	4	5	Final Decision
Chanita	Stay	Stay	Stay	Stay	Stay	Yes
Jordan	Stay	Stay	Stay	Stay	Stay	Yes
April	Stay	Stay	Stay	Stay	Stay	Yes
George	Stay	Stay	Stay	Stay	Stay	Yes
Jenna	Stay	Stay	Stay	Stay	Stay	Yes
Zoe	Stay	Stay	Stay	Stay	Stay	Yes
Johnathan	Not in Experiment		Stay	Stay	Stay	Yes
Sophie	Not in Experiment		Stay	Stay	Stay	Yes
Matt	Not in Experiment		Stay	Leave^{2}	Stay	Yes
Whitney	Leave	Stay	Leave	Leave^{2}	Stay	Yes
Adrian	Stay	Stay	Stay	Stay	Stay	Left^{5}
Thomas	Stay	Leave	Stay	Stay	Stay^{3}	Left^{5}
Kwame	Stay	Stay	Stay	Stay	Leave^{4}	Left
Kasia	Stay	Stay	Stay	Stay	Leave	Left
Duka	Stay	Stay	Stay	Leave	Left	
Gemma	Not in Experiment		Stay	Leave	Left	
Pjay	Stay	Leave^{1}	Left			
Jess	Stay	Leave	Left			
Richie	Stay	Leave	Left			
Lara	Stay	Leave	Left			
Notes	none	1	none	2	3 & 4	5
Left	none	Pjay & Jess	none	Duka	Kasia & Kwame	Thomas & Adrian
Left	none	Lara & Richie	none	Gemma	Kasia & Kwame	Thomas & Adrian

This couple left the experiment outside of commitment ceremony.
This couple elected to leave the experiment during the commitment ceremony.
This couple was removed from the experiment by the experts or Production.

- ^1: Pjay wrote Stay, but agreed to leave the show based on Jess' answer on the couch.
- ^2: After beginning an affair at the Couples' Retreat, Whitney & Matt asked the experts if they could re-enter the experiment as a couple - removing Gemma & Duka from the experiment. Rather than going through the traditional Commitment Ceremony process for these two couples, the experts spoke to them as a combined group before their respective decisions were revealed.
- ^3: Thomas wrote Leave but after hearing Adrian's reasons for wanting to remain in the experiment changed his mind to stay and work on their relationship.
- ^4: Kwame wrote Stay but agreed to leave the experiment as he didn’t want to keep Kasia in the experiment against her will and that she was adamant the relationship was over.
- ^5: Thomas & Adrian decided to mutually separate during the final dinner party and forgo taking part in Final Vows.

=== Couple profiles (2022) ===
No.	Couple	Age	Home	Occupation	Honeymoon	Final Decision	Status
1	Jordan Emmett-Connelly	29	Darlington	Account Manager	Mauritius	Yes	Separated before reunion
1	Chanita Stephenson	29	Derby	Social Worker	Mauritius	Yes	Separated before reunion
2	Duka Cavolli	31	Birmingham	Recruitment HR Coordinator	South Africa	Broke up before final decision	Separated
2	Whitney Hughes	31	St Albans	PA	South Africa	Broke up before final decision	Separated
3	Adrian Sanderson	37	Manchester	Digital Designer	Mexico	Broke up before final decision	Separated
3	Thomas Hartley	31	Liverpool	Mental Health Care Assistant	Mexico	Broke up before final decision	Separated
4	George Roberts	40	Worcester	Financial Advisor	Jamaica	Yes	Separated - Unusual Circumstances
4	April Banbury	32	London	Dress Designer	Jamaica	Yes	Separated - Unusual Circumstances
5	Pjay Finch	31	Birmingham	Dancer/Performer	The Maldives	Broke up before final decision	Separated
5	Jess Potter	31	Cambridgeshire	Dental Hygienist	The Maldives	Broke up before final decision	Separated
6	Richie Dews	51	Sheffield	Sales Advisor	Bavaria, Germany	Broke up before final decision	Separated
6	Lara Eyre	49	Nottingham	Waitress	Bavaria, Germany	Broke up before final decision	Separated
7	Jenna Robinson	32	Blackpool	Zero Waste Shop Owner	Iceland	Yes	Married
7	Zoe Clifton	30	West Midlands	Quantity Surveyor	Iceland	Yes	Married
8	Kwame Badu	42	London	Business Consultant	The Maldives	Broke up before final decision	Separated
8	Kasia Martin	36	London	Businesswoman	The Maldives	Broke up before final decision	Separated
9	Gemma Rose	30	Newton Abbot	Hair Salon Owner	Portugal	Broke up before final decision	Separated
9	Matt Murray	32	Huddersfield	Barber	Portugal	Broke up before final decision	Separated
10	Johnathan Wileman	32	Selby	Carpenter	Saint Lucia	Yes	Separated before reunion
10	Sophie Brown	26	Manchester	Head of Partnerships	Saint Lucia	Yes	Separated before reunion
11	Matt Murray	32	Huddersfield	Barber	N/A (Note: After beginning an affair at the Couples' Retreat, Whitney & Matt asked the experts if they could re-enter the experiment as a couple - removing Gemma & Duka from the experiment.)	Yes	Separated before reunion
11	Whitney Hughes	31	St Albans	PA	N/A	Yes	Separated before reunion

=== Viewing figures (2022) ===
Official, 7-day consolidated ratings are taken from Thinkbox and include E4 +1. From this series, 28-day ratings with viewership on devices other than televisions are no longer available, and so cannot be directly compared with the previous series.

	Viewers (millions)							
	Week 1	Week 2	Week 3	Week 4	Week 5	Week 6	Week 7	Week 8
Monday	1.84	1.79	1.91	1.98 (Note: 2.20, including devices.)	2.13	2.26	2.14	1.98
Tuesday	1.70	1.80	1.96	1.86 (Note: 2.10, including devices.)	2.21	2.25	2.01	2.07
Wednesday	1.84	1.86	1.89	1.82	2.19	2.12	1.85	
Thursday	1.78	1.80	1.74	2.01 (Note: 2.24, including devices.)	2.13	2.05	1.98	
Weekly average	1.79	1.81	1.87	1.92	2.17	2.16	2.00	2.03
Running average	1.79	1.80	1.82	1.85	1.91	1.95	1.96	1.96
Series average	1.965							

A "One Year On" special, broadcast after the first episode on 29 August, consolidated to 729,000 viewers.

==== "Unveiled" specials ====
"Married at First Sight UK: Afters" returned for Series 7 - now rebranded as "Unveiled".

Episode	Airdate	Guests	UK viewers (millions)	Refs
1	4 September 2022	Joel Dommett, Verona Rose, Paul Carrick Brunson and Series 6's Nikita and Morag	0.29	
2	11 September 2022	Grace Dent, Suzi Ruffell and Miles Nazaire	0.15	
3	18 September 2022	Michelle Visage, Sam Thompson and Yinka Bokinni	0.19	
4	25 September 2022	Judi Love, Jamie Laing and Josh Jones	0.23	
5	2 October 2022	Rosie Jones, Larry Dean and Pete Wicks	0.34	
6	9 October 2022	Rickie Haywood Williams, Melvin Odoom and Lou Sanders	0.23	
7	16 October 2022	Vogue Williams, Tom Read Wilson and Catherine Bohart	0.35	
8	18 October 2022	Judi Love, Paul Carrick Brunson and Charlene Douglas	0.44	

== Series 8 (2023) ==
After the success of the sixth and seventh series, an extended thirty-six episode version using the same format was commissioned, starting on 18 September 2023. The cast included the show's first transgender bride Ella Morgan Clark, and the first limb deficient bride, Jay. In each of Episodes 1, 2, 4 & 5, two couples were matched and married. In Episode 12, a further two couples were matched and married before the final two weddings occurred in Episodes 17 & 18.

=== Ceremony history (2023) ===
Episode:	8	11	15	21	25	30	33/34
Ceremony:	1	2	3	4	5	6	Final Decision
Georges	Stay	Stay	Stay	Stay	Stay	Stay	Yes
Peggy	Stay	Stay	Stay	Stay	Leave	Stay	Yes
Paul	Stay	Stay	Stay	Stay	Stay	Stay	Yes
Tasha	Stay	Stay	Stay	Stay	Stay	Stay	Yes
Erica	Not in Experiment		Stay	Stay	Stay	Stay	Yes
Jordan	Not in Experiment		Stay	Stay	Stay	Stay	Yes
Adrienne	Not in Experiment			Stay	Stay	Stay	Yes
Matt	Not in Experiment			Stay	Stay	Stay	Yes
Ella	Stay	Stay	Stay	N/A^{5}	Stay	Stay	No
JJ	Not in Experiment		Stay	Leave	Stay	Stay	No
Arthur	Stay	Stay^{1}	Stay	Stay	Stay	Stay	Yes
Laura	Stay	Stay	Stay	Stay	Stay	Stay	No
Rozz	Stay	Stay	Stay	Stay	Stay	Leave	Left
Thomas	Stay	Stay	Stay	Stay	Stay	Leave	Left
Mark	Not in Experiment			Stay	Stay	Left^{8}	
Sean	Not in Experiment			Stay	Stay	Left^{8}	
Luke	Stay	Stay	Stay	Stay	Removed ^{7}		
Jay	Stay	Stay	Stay	Stay	Removed ^{7}		
Bianca	Not in Experiment		Stay	Leave	Left		
Nathanial	Stay	Stay	Stay	Left^{5}			
Brad	Stay	Stay	N/A^{2}	Removed ^{4}			
Shona	Stay	Stay	N/A^{2}	Removed ^{4}			
Porscha	Stay	Stay	Stay	Left^{3}			
Terence	Leave	Stay	Leave	Left^{3}			
Notes	none	1	2, 3	4, 5	6, 7	8	none
Ejected	none			Brad & Shona	Luke & Jay	none	
Left	none		Terence & Porscha	Bianca	none	Mark & Sean	Laura & Arthur
Left	none		Terence & Porscha	Nathanial	none	Thomas & Rozz	Ella & JJ

This couple left the experiment outside of commitment ceremony.
This couple elected to leave the experiment during the commitment ceremony.
This couple was removed from the experiment by the experts or Production.

- ^1: Arthur was unwell for the second Dinner Party and Commitment Ceremony, so his decision was delivered by Expert Mel in the form of a letter.
- ^2: Brad & Shona did not attend the third Commitment Ceremony, due to their relationship challenges.
- ^3: Despite Porscha writing Stay at the third Commitment Ceremony, Terence decided to leave the experiment - and as a result, Porscha also left.
- ^4: Brad & Shona were removed from the experiment by the experts at the start of the fourth week.
- ^5: Nathanial decided to leave the experiment during the fourth dinner party, after an argument with Ella over her relationship with JJ. Ella left the experiment after the commitment ceremony.
- ^6: Ella & JJ re-entered the experiment as a couple at the couple's retreat.
- ^7: Luke was ejected from the experiment after an altercation with Jordan before the fifth Commitment Ceremony. As a result, Jay also had to leave.
- ^8: Sean decided to leave during the sixth Dinner Party. As a result, Mark also left the experiment.

=== Couple profiles (2023) ===
No.	Couple	Age	Home	Occupation	Honeymoon	Final Decision	Status
1	Luke Worley	30	Clacton	Sales Executive	Grenada	Removed from experiment	Separated
1	Jay Howard	31	Accrington	Sales Team Leader	Grenada	Removed from experiment	Separated
2	Arthur Poremba	34	London	Tennis Coach	Mexico	No	Separated
2	Laura Vaughan	34	Portsmouth	Finance Manager	Mexico	No	Separated
3	Thomas Kriaras	27	Wiltshire	Investment Communications	Austria	Broke up before final decision	Separated
3	Rosaline Darlington	28	Crewe	Florist	Austria	Broke up before final decision	Separated
4	Nathanial Valentino	36	Manchester	Events Marketing Manager	Mexico	Broke up before final decision	Separated
4	Ella Morgan Clark	29	Weston-Super-Mare	Clinic Consultant	Mexico	Broke up before final decision	Separated
5	Georges Berthonneau	30	Surrey	Sports Rehabilitator	Thailand	Yes	Separated after experiment
5	Peggy Rose	32	Kent	Technology Risk Partner	Thailand	Yes	Separated after experiment
6	Paul Liba	26	Chesham	Account Manager	Costa Rica	Yes	Separated after experiment
6	Tasha Jay	25	Leeds	Childcare Assistant	Costa Rica	Yes	Separated after experiment
7	Brad Skelly	27	Grimsby	Model	The Maldives	Removed from experiment	Separated
7	Shona Manderson	31	Nottingham	Performing Arts Teacher	The Maldives	Removed from experiment	Separated
8	Terence Edwards	40	Reading	Youth Worker/DJ	Morocco	Broke up before final decision	Separated
8	Porsha Pernnelle	36	London	Executive Assistant	Morocco	Broke up before final decision	Separated
9	John Joe "JJ" Slater	30	Essex	Fashion Brand Owner	Mauritius	Broke up before final decision	Separated
9	Bianca Petronzi	29	Buxton	Hair Extension Specialist	Mauritius	Broke up before final decision	Separated
10	Jordan Gayle	26	Sheffield	Personal Trainer	Antigua	Yes	Separated after experiment
10	Erica Roberts	25	Edinburgh	Dance Teacher	Antigua	Yes	Separated after experiment
11	Matt Pilmoor	29	Harrogate	Window Cleaner	Tenerife	Yes	Separated before reunion
11	Adrienne Naylor	26	Cumbria	Project Support Worker	Tenerife	Yes	Separated before reunion
12	Mark Kiley	36	London	Customer Service Manager	Lapland	Broke up before final decision	Separated
12	Sean Malkin	31	Durham	Store Manager	Lapland	Broke up before final decision	Separated
13	John Joe "JJ" Slater	30	Essex	Fashion Brand Owner	N/A^{6}	No	Separated
13	Ella Morgan Clark	29	Weston-Super-Mare	Clinic Consultant	N/A^{6}	No	Separated

=== Viewing figures (2023) ===
Official, 7-day consolidated ratings are taken from Thinkbox and include E4 +1, but exclude viewership on devices.

	Viewers (millions)								
	Week 1	Week 2	Week 3	Week 4	Week 5	Week 6	Week 7	Week 8	Week 9
Monday	1.58	1.81	1.95	1.81	2.13	2.23	2.09	2.02	2.14
Tuesday	1.74	1.76	1.77	1.81	2.09	2.34	2.05	2.04	2.02
Wednesday	1.66	1.82	1.94	1.86	2.26	2.27	2.16	2.05	2.35
Thursday	1.48	1.82	1.85	1.97	2.34	2.12	2.32	2.15	2.01
Weekly average	1.62	1.80	1.88	1.86	2.21	2.26	2.16	2.06	2.13
Running average	1.62	1.71	1.77	1.79	1.87	1.94	1.97	1.98	2.00
Series average	1.996								

== Series 9 (2024) ==
After the success of the sixth, seventh & eighth series, another thirty-six episode version using the same format was commissioned, starting on 16 September 2024. In each of Episodes 1, 2, 4 & 5, two couples were matched and married. In each of Episodes 12, 13 & 14, a further couple was married.

=== Ceremony history (2024) ===
Episode:	8	11	17	21	25	30	33
Ceremony:	1	2	3	4	5	6	Final Decision
Lacey	Stay	Stay	Stay	Stay	Stay	Stay	Yes
Nathan	Stay	Stay	Stay	Stay	Stay	Stay	Yes
Sacha	Stay	Stay	Stay	Stay	Stay	Leave	Yes
Ross	Stay	Stay	Stay	Stay	Stay	Stay	Yes
Adam	Stay	Stay	Stay	Stay	Stay	Stay	N/A^{4}
Polly	Stay	Stay	Stay	Stay	Stay	Stay	No
Amy	Not in Experiment		Stay	Stay	Stay	Stay^{3}	No
Luke	Not in Experiment		Stay	Stay	Stay	Stay^{3}	Yes
Kieran	Stay	Stay	Stay	Stay	Stay	Leave	Left
Kristina	Stay	Stay	Stay	Stay	Stay	Leave	Left
Caspar	Stay	Stay	Leave	Stay	Leave	Left	
Emma	Stay	Stay	Stay	Stay	Leave	Left	
Alex	Stay^{1}	Stay	Stay	Stay	Leave	Left	
Holly	Stay^{1}	Stay	Stay	Stay	Leave	Left	
Ryan	Not in Experiment		Stay	Stay	Left^{2}		
Sionainn	Not in Experiment		Stay	Stay	Left^{2}		
Hannah	Not in Experiment		Stay	Leave	Left		
Stephen	Not in Experiment		Leave	Leave	Left		
Orson	Stay	Stay	Stay	Leave	Left		
Richelle	Stay	Stay	Stay	Leave	Left		
Charlie	Stay	Leave	Left				
Eve	Stay	Leave	Left				
Notes	1	none			2	3	4
Left	none	Charlie & Eve	none	Hannah & Stephen; Orson & Richelle	Ryan & Sionainn	Kieran & Kristina	Amy & Luke; Polly & Adam
Left	none	Charlie & Eve	none	Hannah & Stephen; Orson & Richelle	Emma & Caspar	Kieran & Kristina	Amy & Luke; Polly & Adam
Left	none	Charlie & Eve	none	Hannah & Stephen; Orson & Richelle	Alex & Holly	Kieran & Kristina	Amy & Luke; Polly & Adam

This couple left the experiment outside of commitment ceremony.
This couple elected to leave the experiment during the commitment ceremony.

- ^1: Holly offered to change her decision to Leave, but Alex decided to stay in the process for another week and work on their relationship.
- ^2: Ryan & Sionainn decided to leave the experiment during Love/Hate Week after an argument.
- ^3: Luke offered to change his decision to Leave, but Amy decided to stay in the process for another week and work on their relationship.
- ^4: Adam left his & Polly's Vow Renewal without offering a decision.

=== Couple profiles (2024) ===
No.	Couple	Age	Home	Occupation	Honeymoon	Final Decision	Status
1	Kieran Chapman	28	Newcastle upon Tyne	Mobile Mechanic	Ko Samui, Thailand	Broke up before final decision	Separated
1	Kristina Goodsell	31	Bexhill-on-Sea	Dog Walker	Ko Samui, Thailand	Broke up before final decision	Separated
2	Caspar Todd	34	New Forest	Head Gardener	Montego Bay, Jamaica	Broke up before final decision	Separated
2	Emma Barnes	31	Bristol	Sales Manager	Montego Bay, Jamaica	Broke up before final decision	Separated
3	Eve Reid	31	Omagh	Lifeguard & Personal Trainer	Mexico	Broke up before final decision	Separated
3	Charlie Curtis	30	Surrey	Lettings Operations Coordinator	Mexico	Broke up before final decision	Separated
4	Nathan Campbell	24	Somerset	Engineer	The Gambia	Yes	Separated after experiment
4	Lacey Martin	27	Cheshunt	Office Manager	The Gambia	Yes	Separated after experiment
5	Ross McCarthy	32	Salford	Painter & Decorator	Barbados	Yes	Separated after experiment
5	Sacha Jones	29	Walsall	Aesthetics Practitioner	Barbados	Yes	Separated after experiment
6	Adam Nightingale	33	Nottingham	Barber	Trentino	No	Separated
6	Polly Sellman	28	Maidstone	Careers Advisor	Trentino	No	Separated
7	Alex Henry	28	Birmingham	Aviation Operations	The Maldives	Broke up before final decision	Separated
7	Holly Ditchfield	29	Huddersfield	Beautician	The Maldives	Broke up before final decision	Separated
8	Orson Nurse	41	Birmingham	Project Engineer	Mauritius	Broke up before final decision	Separated
8	Richelle Case	48	London	Head of Alternative Investments	Mauritius	Broke up before final decision	Separated
9	Luke Debono	30	Maidstone	Prison Education Manager	The Bahamas	No	Separated
9	Amy Kenyon	27	Blackburn	Wedding Planner	The Bahamas	No	Separated
10	Stephen Nolson	33	Berkshire	Medical Technology Technician	Punta Cana, Dominican Republic	Broke up before final decision	Separated
10	Hannah Norburn	32	Altrincham	Health & Fitness Business Owner	Punta Cana, Dominican Republic	Broke up before final decision	Separated
11	Ryan Livesey	28	Manchester	Bin Man	Copenhagen, Denmark	Broke up before final decision	Separated
11	Sionainn Carmichael	29	Glasgow	Make Up Artist	Copenhagen, Denmark	Broke up before final decision	Separated

=== Viewing figures (2024) ===
Official, 7-day consolidated ratings are taken from Thinkbox and include E4 +1, but exclude viewership on devices.

	Viewers (millions)								
	Week 1	Week 2	Week 3	Week 4	Week 5	Week 6	Week 7	Week 8	Week 9
Monday	1.79	2.07	2.12	2.01	2.11	2.03	2.16	2.12	2.26
Tuesday	1.91	2.15	2.14	2.04	2.17	2.09	2.04	1.93	2.06
Wednesday	1.96	2.32	2.18	2.18	2.16	2.18	2.03	1.88	1.86
Thursday	1.91	2.30	2.22	2.15	2.10	2.40	2.09	1.93	2.07
Weekly average	1.89	2.21	2.16	2.09	2.13	2.17	2.08	1.96	2.06
Running average	1.89	2.05	2.09	2.09	2.10	2.11	2.11	2.09	2.09
Series average	2.09								

== Series 10 (2025) ==
=== Ceremony history (2025) ===
Episode:	8	11	17	21/22	24	29	33/34
Ceremony:	1	2	3	4	5	6	Final Vows
Keye	Stay	Stay	Stay	Stay	Stay	Stay	Yes
Davide	Stay^{1}	Stay	Stay	Stay	Stay	Stay	Yes
Rebecca	Stay	Stay	Stay	Stay	Stay	Stay	Yes
Bailey	Stay	Stay	Stay	Stay	Stay	Stay	Yes
Abigail	Not in Experiment		Stay	Stay	Stay	Stay	Yes
John	Not in Experiment		Stay	Stay	Stay	Stay	Yes
Leisha	Stay	Stay	Stay	Stay	Stay	Stay	Yes
Reiss	Stay	Stay	Stay	Stay	Stay	Stay	Yes
Leigh	Not in Experiment		Stay	Stay	Stay	Stay	No
Leah	Not in Experiment		Stay	Stay	Stay	Stay	No
Grace	Stay	Stay	Stay	Stay	Stay	N/A^{5}	Left
Ashley	Stay	Stay	Stay	Stay	Stay	N/A^{5}	Left
Nelly	Stay	Stay	Stay	Stay	Stay	Leave	Left
Steven	Stay	Stay	Stay	Stay	Stay	Leave	Left
April	Not in Experiment		Stay	Stay	Stay	Leave	Left
Leo	Not in Experiment		Stay	Stay	Stay	Leave	Left
Julia-Ruth	Stay	Stay	Stay	Stay	Leave	Left	
Divarni	Stay	Stay	Stay	Stay	Leave	Left	
Maeve	Stay	Stay	Stay	Stay	Leave^{4}	Left	
Joe	Stay^{1}	Stay	Stay	N/A^{3}	Leave^{4}	Left	
Sarah	Stay	Stay	Leave^{2}	Left			
Dean	Stay	Stay	Leave^{2}	Left			
Anita	Leave	Leave	Left				
Paul	Stay	Leave	Left				
Notes	1	none	2	3	4	5	
Left	none	Anita & Paul	Sarah & Dean	none	Julia-Ruth & Divarni; Maeve & Joe	Grace & Ashley	Leigh & Leah
Left	none	Anita & Paul	Sarah & Dean	none	Julia-Ruth & Divarni; Maeve & Joe	Nelly & Steven	Leigh & Leah
Left	none	Anita & Paul	Sarah & Dean	none	Julia-Ruth & Divarni; Maeve & Joe	April & Leo	Leigh & Leah

- ^1: Davide and Joe did not attend the first commitment ceremony (CC) due to illness. Expert Charlene provided a letter to Keye written by Davide. Keye read the letter to the experts and the group which revealed that Davide had chosen to stay. Later, expert Paul told Maeve and the group that Joe had chosen to stay.
- ^2: Sarah and Dean wrote stay on their CC cards. While on the couch at the CC, the couple discussed their relationship with the experts. The experts provided feedback and recommendations. After reflecting on the expert's advice, Sarah and Dean decided to leave the experiment.
- ^3: Joe did not attend the fourth CC as he was at his grandfather's funeral. There was no mention during the CC whether Joe would continue in the experiment.
- ^4: Joe did not attend the fifth CC. He made a brief appearance in episode 23 at the retreat to speak with Maeve about their relationship but did not subsequently attend the retreat dinner party. At the CC, expert Mel read a letter written by Joe to Maeve and the group in which Joe expressed his hope for the experiment, his gratitude for Maeve and regret on how things were left. He also wrote that he was adamant in his decision to leave.
- ^5: Grace and Ashley did not attend the sixth CC as they separated right before Home Stay week. They attended separately a session with the experts discussing their relationship, after which they left the experiment.

=== Couple profiles (2025) ===
No.	Couple	Age	Home	Occupation	Honeymoon	Final Decision	Status
1	Sarah Gillanders	31	Aberdeen	Recruitment Consultant	Ayada Maldives Resort, Magudhuva Island, Gaafu Dhaalu Atoll, Maldives	Broke up before final decision	Separated
1	Dean Vary	31	Feltham	Team Building Host	Ayada Maldives Resort, Magudhuva Island, Gaafu Dhaalu Atoll, Maldives	Broke up before final decision	Separated
2	Keye-Luke Tortice-Lunn	31	London	Marketing Manager	Madikwe Safari Lodge, Madikwe Game Reserve, South Africa	Yes	Separated after experiment
2	Davide Anica	33	Portugal	Cabin Crew	Madikwe Safari Lodge, Madikwe Game Reserve, South Africa	Yes	Separated after experiment
3	Grace Law	31	Norwich	Midwife	NH Collection Samui Peace Resort, Ko Samui, Thailand	Broke up before final decision	Separated
3	Ashley Dommett	35	Bridgend	Operations Director	NH Collection Samui Peace Resort, Ko Samui, Thailand	Broke up before final decision	Separated
4	Neelima (Nelly) Patel	30	Manchester	Cosmetic Dentist	Ocean Eden Bay Resort, Trelawny Parish, Jamaica	Broke up before final decision	Separated
4	Steven Springett	34	Essex	Investment Banking Manager	Ocean Eden Bay Resort, Trelawny Parish, Jamaica	Broke up before final decision	Separated
5	Leigh Harris	30	Romford	NHS Clinical Coder	Nendaz, Switzerland	No	Separated
5	Leah Marie Tyrer	35	Liverpool	Business Owner	Nendaz, Switzerland	No	Separated
6	Maeve Mathieson	29	Newcastle	Aesthetics Practitioner	Antigua, Antigua and Barbuda	Broke up before final decision	Separated
6	Joe Wood	31	Huddersfield	Personal Trainer	Antigua, Antigua and Barbuda	Broke up before final decision	Separated
7	Julia-Ruth Smith	29	New Zealand	Professional Dancer	Dar Sabra Resort, Marrakesh, Morocco	Broke up before final decision	Separated
7	Divarni A. Groce-Balogun (Ashley Wright)	29	London	Musician	Dar Sabra Resort, Marrakesh, Morocco	Broke up before final decision	Separated
8	Rebecca Fenney	32	Liverpool	Aesthetics Nurse and clinic owner	La Plantation d'Albion Club Med, Mauritius	Yes	Separated after experiment
8	David Bailey “Smith”	36	St Albans	Sales Manager	La Plantation d'Albion Club Med, Mauritius	Yes	Separated after experiment
9	Anita Barker	54	Durham	Operations Manager	Melia Llana Beach Resort & Spa, Sal, Cape Verde	Broke up before final decision	Separated
9	Paul Richardson	60	Edinburgh	Retired	Melia Llana Beach Resort & Spa, Sal, Cape Verde	Broke up before final decision	Separated
10	Abigail Callahan	34	Bournemouth	Veterinary Nurse	Seychelles	Yes	Together
10	John Shepard	38	Flintshire	Social Media Manager	Seychelles	Yes	Together
11	Leisha Lightbody	31	Edinburgh	Digital Marketing	Away Bangkok Riverside Kene, Bangkok, Thailand	Yes	Separated before reunion
11	Reiss Boyce	33	Essex	Painter & Decorator	Away Bangkok Riverside Kene, Bangkok, Thailand	Yes	Separated before reunion
12	April Holmes	31	Weymouth	Business Owner	Levi, Finland	Broke up before final decision	Separated
12	Leo Stanley	31	Chichester	Graphic Designer	Levi, Finland	Broke up before final decision	Separated

=== Viewing figures (2025) ===
Official, 7-day consolidated ratings are taken from BARB and include E4 +1, but exclude viewership on devices.

	Viewers (millions)							
	Week 1	Week 2	Week 3	Week 4	Week 5	Week 6	Week 7	Week 8
Sunday	2.50	2.30	N/A	N/A	2.60	2.60	2.63	
Monday	2.75	2.61	2.52	2.68	2.68	2.73		
Tuesday	2.41	2.60	2.41	2.56	2.56	2.58		
Wednesday	2.35	2.40	N/A	2.74	2.74	2.62		
Thursday	2.45	2.58						
Friday								
Weekly average	2.49	2.50	2.47	2.66	2.65	2.63		
Running average	2.49	2.49	2.49	2.53	2.55	2.57		
Series average								

== Allegations of sexual misconduct and Panorama investigation ==
In May 2026, Panorama aired an episode titled "The Dark Side of Married at First Sight", after two of the brides on the show alleged that they had been raped during filming of the show, with another describing an allegation of a non-consensual sex act. Channel 4 subsequently removed all episodes from streaming and linear services, alongside social media channels.

Responding to the allegations, Channel 4's outgoing chief content officer, Ian Katz, said he had not seen the Panorama documentary, adding: "They are obviously very serious allegations. We want to see the show and when we see the show we will respond." Channel 4's CEO, Priya Dogra, said that she was "deeply sorry".

Following the allegations, holiday company TUI ended its sponsorship of the programme.

A cross-party group of MPs, the Culture, Media and Sport Committee, wrote to Channel 4 and regulator Ofcom saying that both bodies "have urgent questions to answer".

The Metropolitan Police issued an appeal to anyone who had allegations of abuse during the show to come forward.

In November 2026, Priya Dogra, Channel 4's chief executive, announced that the show would be cancelled and that its budget would be reinvested in "distinctive new programming".
