= Chloe Brockett =

English television personality (born 2000)

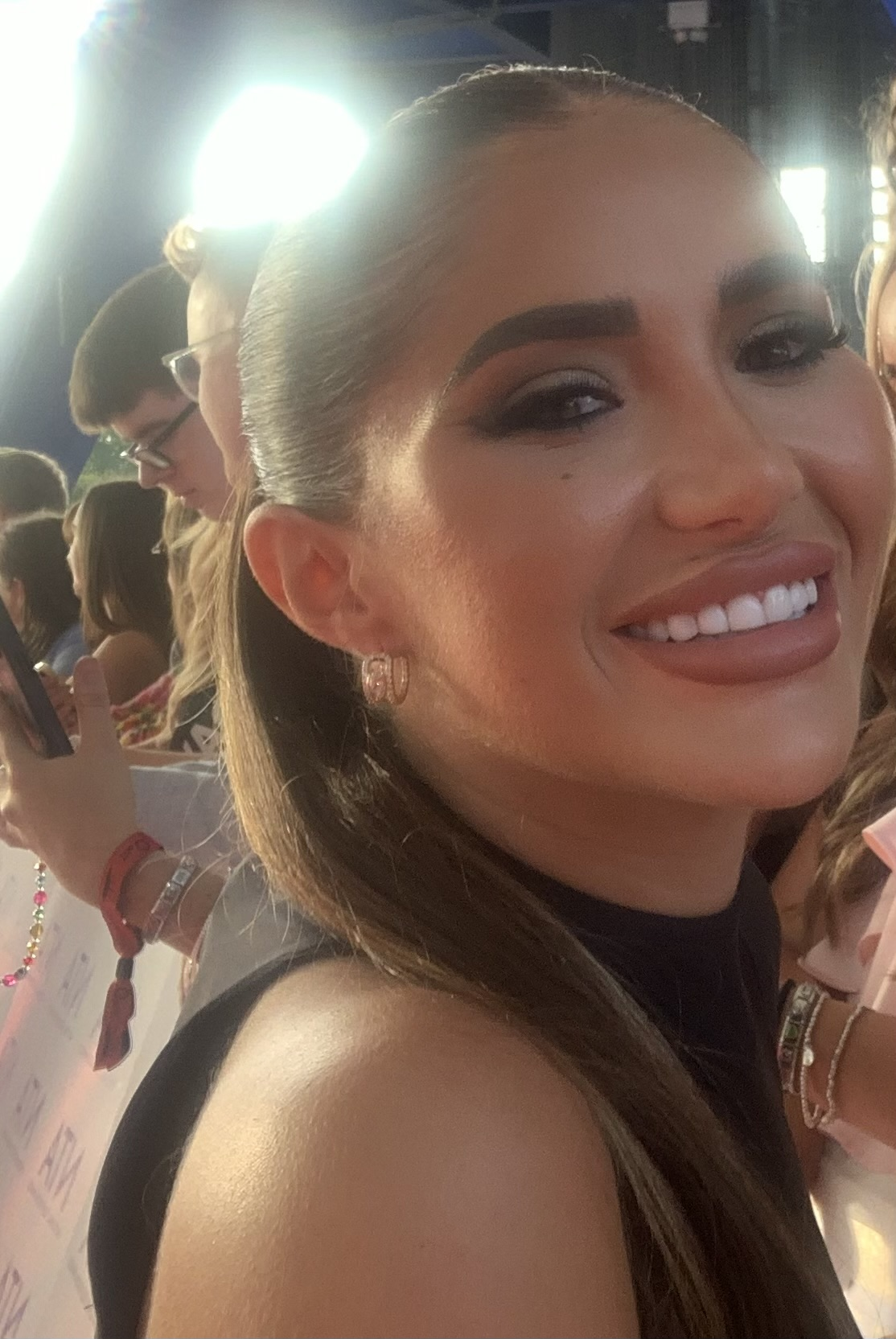
- Brockett in 2023
- Born: 3 December 2000 (age 25); Newham, London, England
- Occupation: Television personality
- Years active: 2019–present
- Television: The Only Way Is Essex; Celebs Go Dating

Chloe Brockett (born 3 December 2000) is an English television personality. After moving to Chafford Hundred, Essex, at a young age, she began acting with various appearances in television advertisements. Whilst working as a hairdresser, she was cast in the ITVBe reality series The Only Way Is Essex in 2019. As well as appearing on the series, she has also made appearances on Dinner Date and Celebs Go Dating, as well as owning two businesses.

== Life and career ==
Brockett was born on 3 December 2000 in Newham, London. She was born a month earlier than expected to black cab driver mother Clare Brockett. Due to being born prematurely and weighing 4 lbs 4 oz, she was placed into intensive care; her mother also had pre-eclampsia during the pregnancy. Doctors thought that the birth would lead to the death of one or both of them, which Brockett has said gave the two a close relationship throughout their lives. At the age of one, Brockett and her mother moved to Chafford Hundred, Essex. As a child, Brockett attended gymnastics, horse-riding and ballet classes, but she did not enjoy them and preferred to sit with the adults and drink lattes. At the age of eight, Brockett began acting and attended singing, dancing and acting classes. She did television advertisements for E.ON UK and the NSPCC, but stated that she had to stop due to looking too old for the child roles. After she had finished secondary school, Brockett began attending college, where she studied hair and media makeup due to enjoying the atmosphere of being on a set when she was younger. Since she did not enjoy the course, she left after two weeks and got a job in a hair salon in London in 2018.

Brockett left her position in the hair salon in December 2018 due to being cast in the ITVBe reality series The Only Way Is Essex. Brockett and her mother were pictured filming for the series in February 2019, ahead of their casting announcement. She made her first appearance on the series alongside her mother in the twenty-fourth series, first broadcast in March 2019. Shortly after her casting in The Only Way Is Essex, Brockett appeared on the ITVBe series Dinner Date. In 2020, 176 complaints were made to Ofcom about the way Brockett had been spoken to by co-star Olivia Attwood, with many viewers feeling that she had been bullied by Attwood. In 2020, she launched a false eyelash brand, which she followed up by launching a clothing company, Miss Babe, in 2021. Also in 2021, it was announced that she had been cast in the E4 reality dating series Celebs Go Dating. She appeared in the tenth series at the beginning of 2022.

In 2022, Brockett guest starred in the fourth series of Eating with My Ex: Celebrity Specials which aired on BBC Three. Whilst filming for a series of The Only Way Is Essex in 2023, Brockett was suspended mid-series due to throwing numerous drinks at co-star Roman Hackett. A year later, she appeared on the third series of MTV's Celebrity Ex On The Beach.

== Filmography ==
As herself
Year	Title	Notes
2019–2023	The Only Way Is Essex	Main role
2019	Dinner Date	Guest star
2022	Celebs Go Dating	Main role; series 10
2022	Celebrity Eating with My Ex	Guest star
2024	Celebrity Ex On The Beach	Recurring role; series 3
