= List of Love Island (2015 TV series) contestants =

The following is a list of contestants that have appeared on the ITV2 reality series Love Island. As of the thirteenth series, 442 islanders have entered the villa, two of whom; Adam Collard and Kady McDermott entered the villa twice, returning in the eighth and tenth series respectively. The youngest islander is Amelia Peters, who was 18 years old when she took part in the third series, whereas the oldest islander is Joey Essex, who was 33 years old when he entered the eleventh series.

The youngest winners are Amber Davies and Finn Tapp, who were 20 years old when they won the third and sixth series, respectively. Ekin-Su Cülcüloğlu and Josh Oyinsan are the oldest winners, who were 27 and 29 years old when they won the eighth and eleventh series, respectively.

== Key legend ==
Key

Winner
Runner-up
Third place
Fourth place
Dumped
Walked
Removed
Contestant entered for the second time
Contestant previously appeared or played on another version of the show

== Series 1–5 (2015–2019) ==
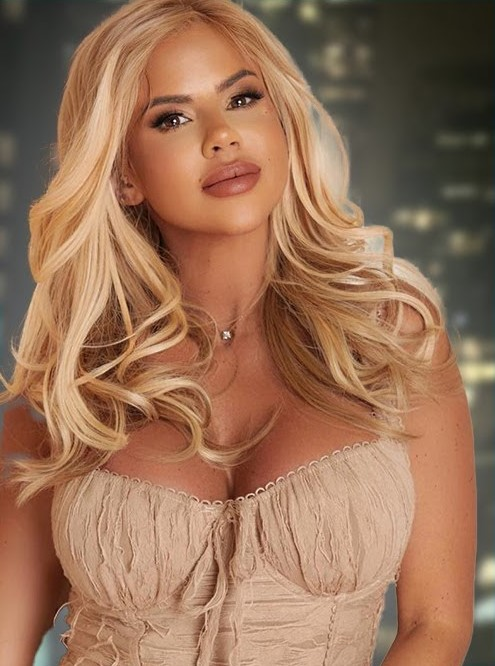
Hannah Elizabeth, Series 1

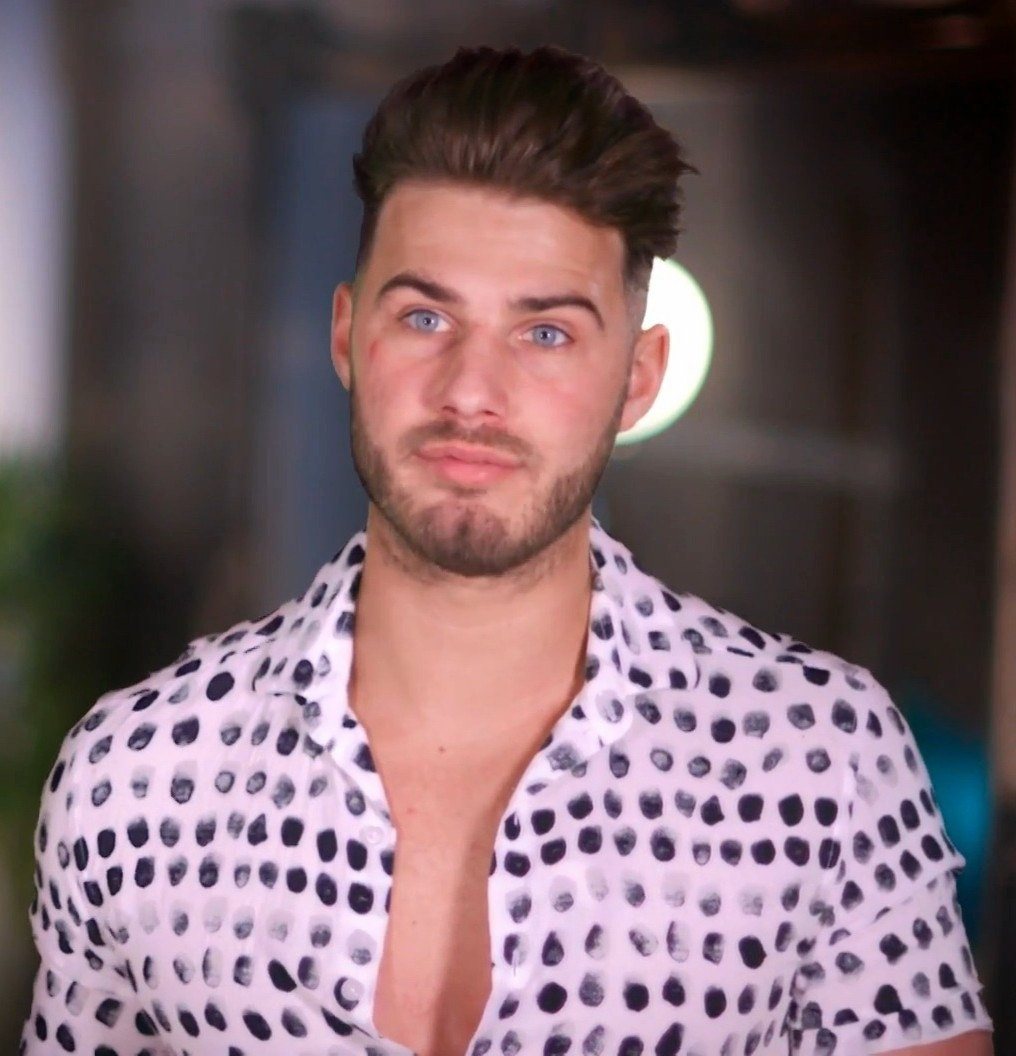
Josh Ritchie, Series 1

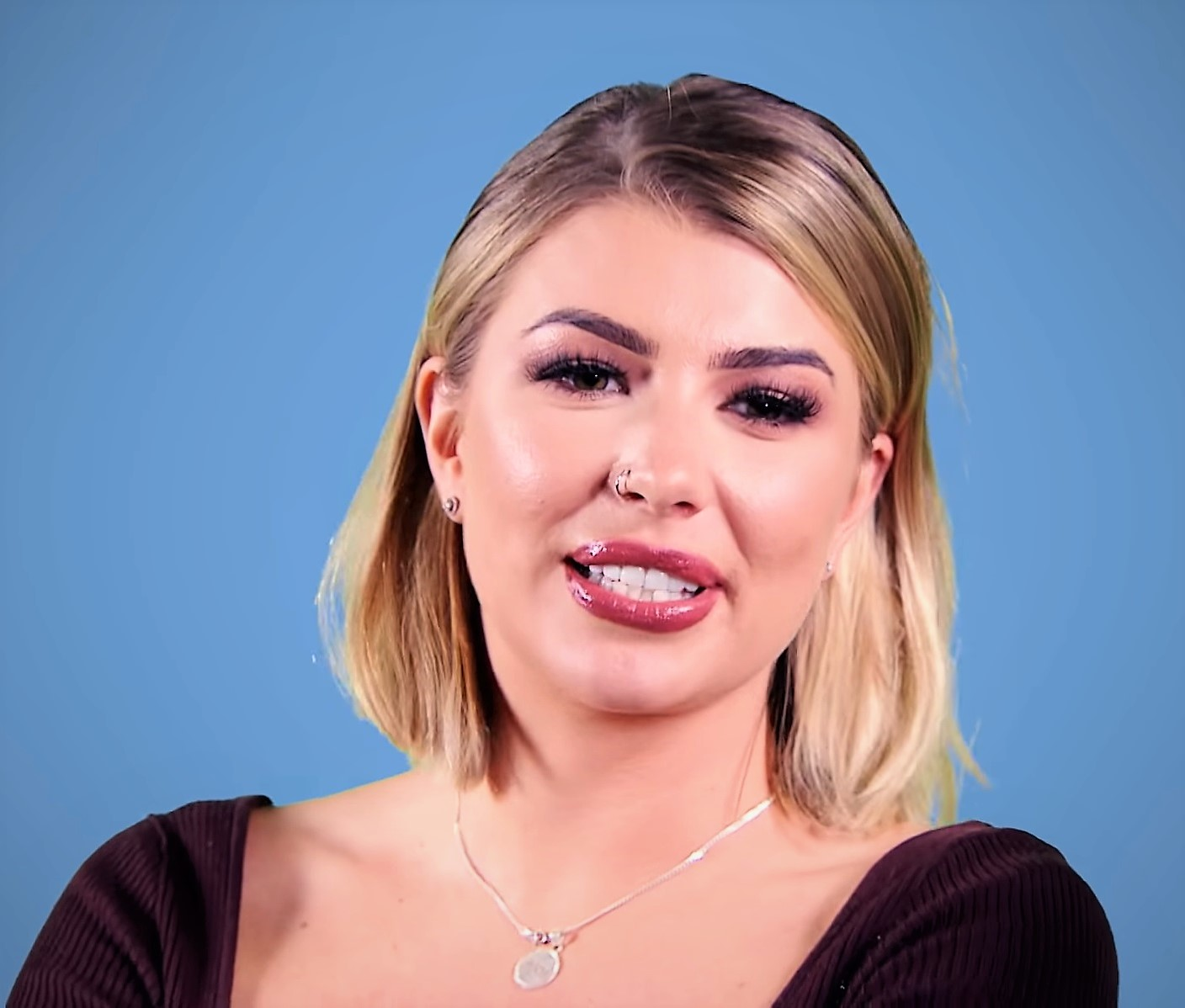
Olivia Bowen, Series 2

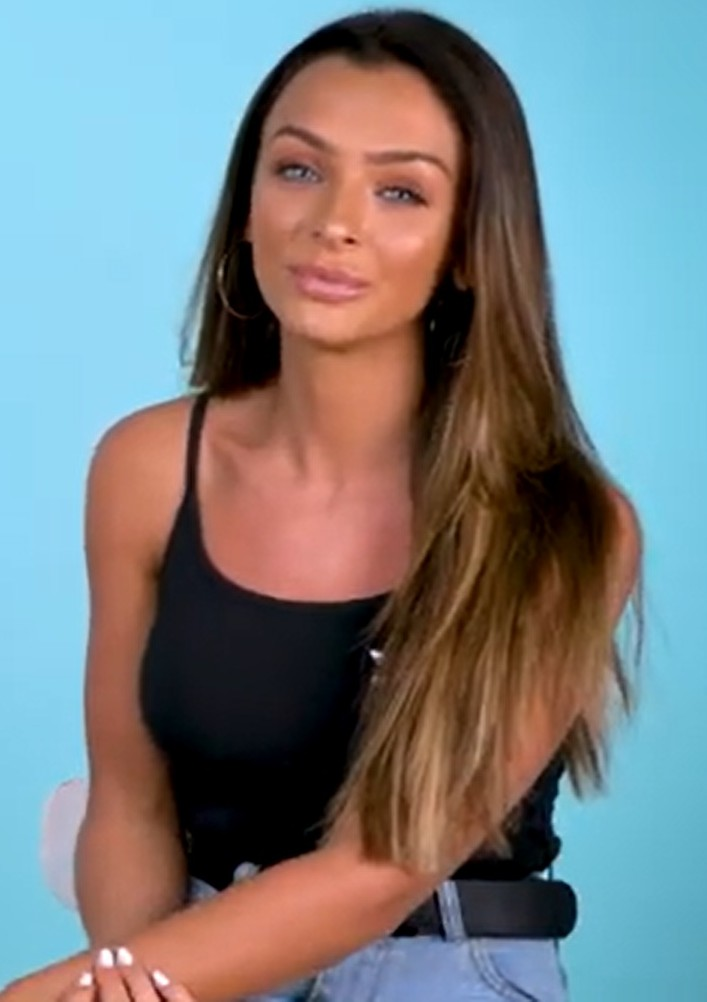
Kady McDermott, Series 2, Series 10

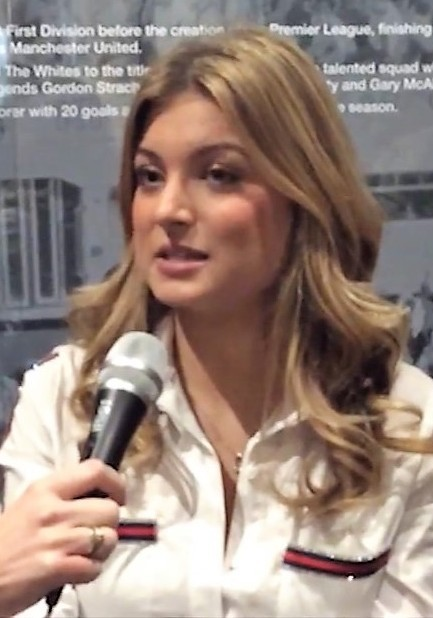
Zara Holland, Series 2

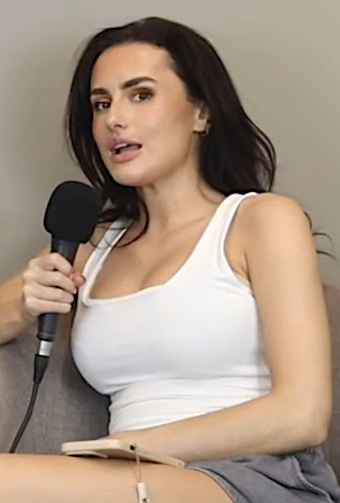
Amber Davies, Series 3

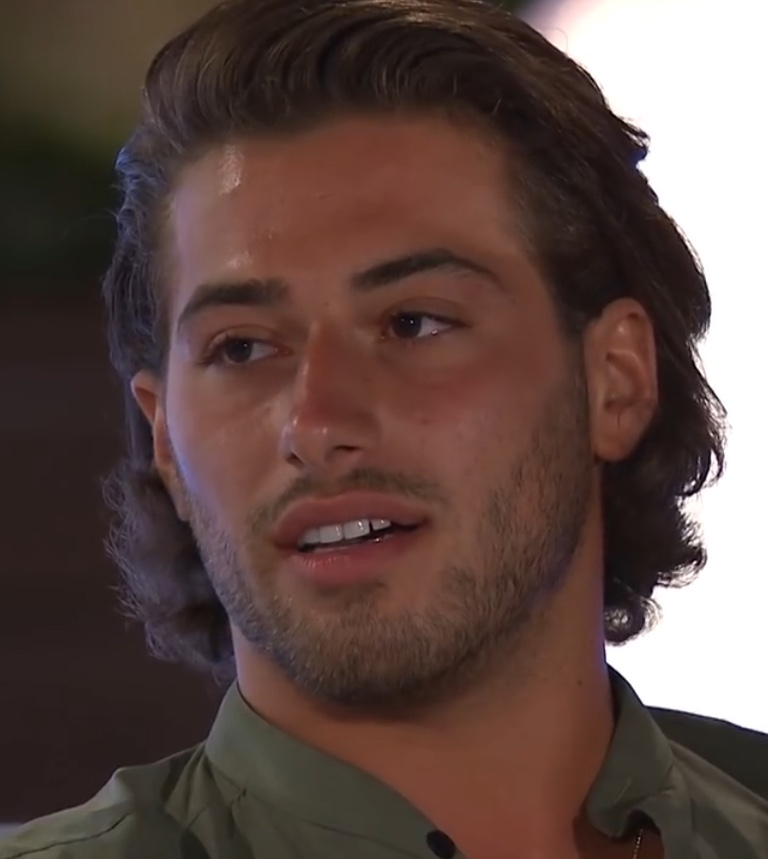
Kem Cetinay, Series 3

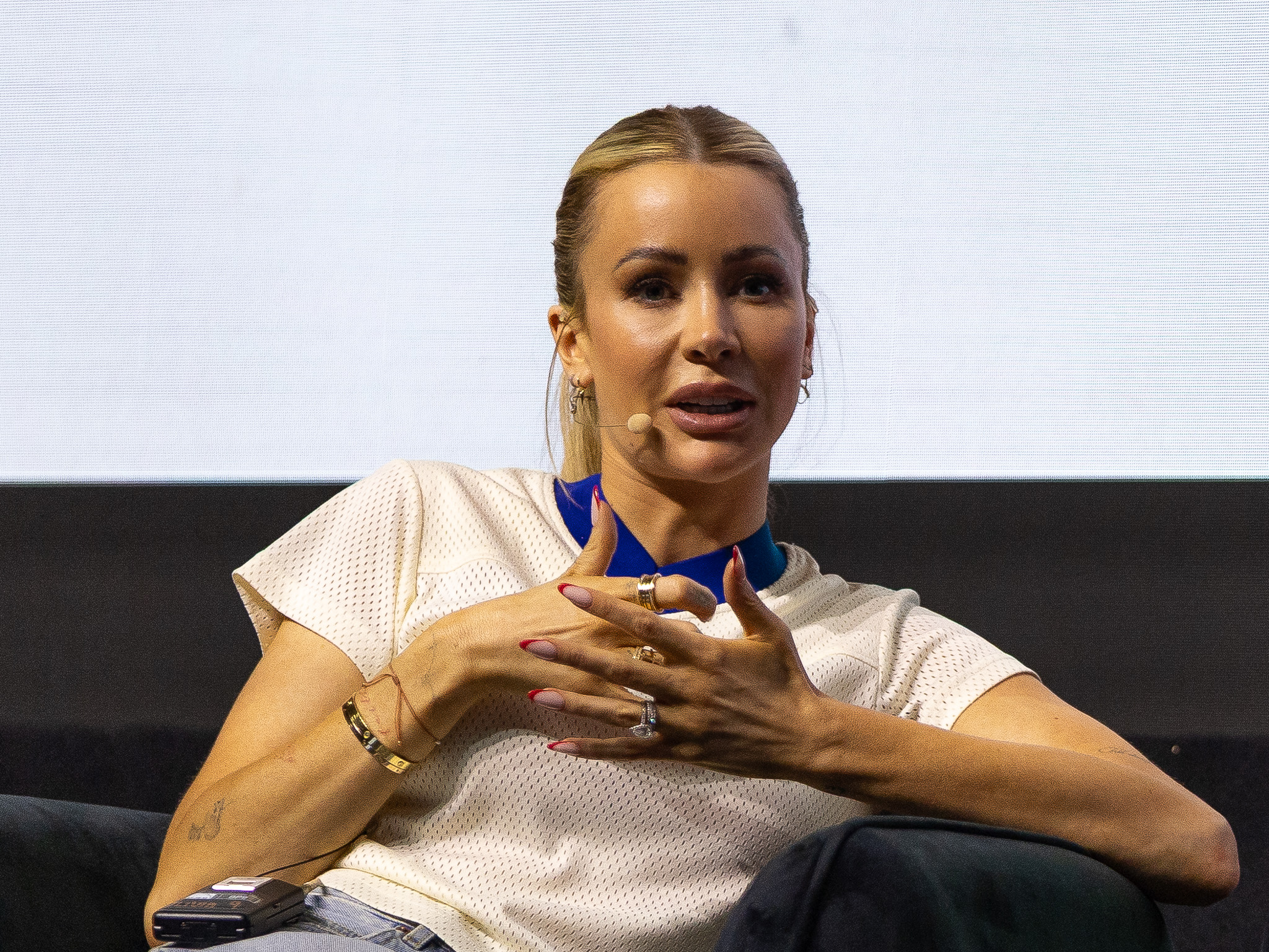
Olivia Attwood, Series 3

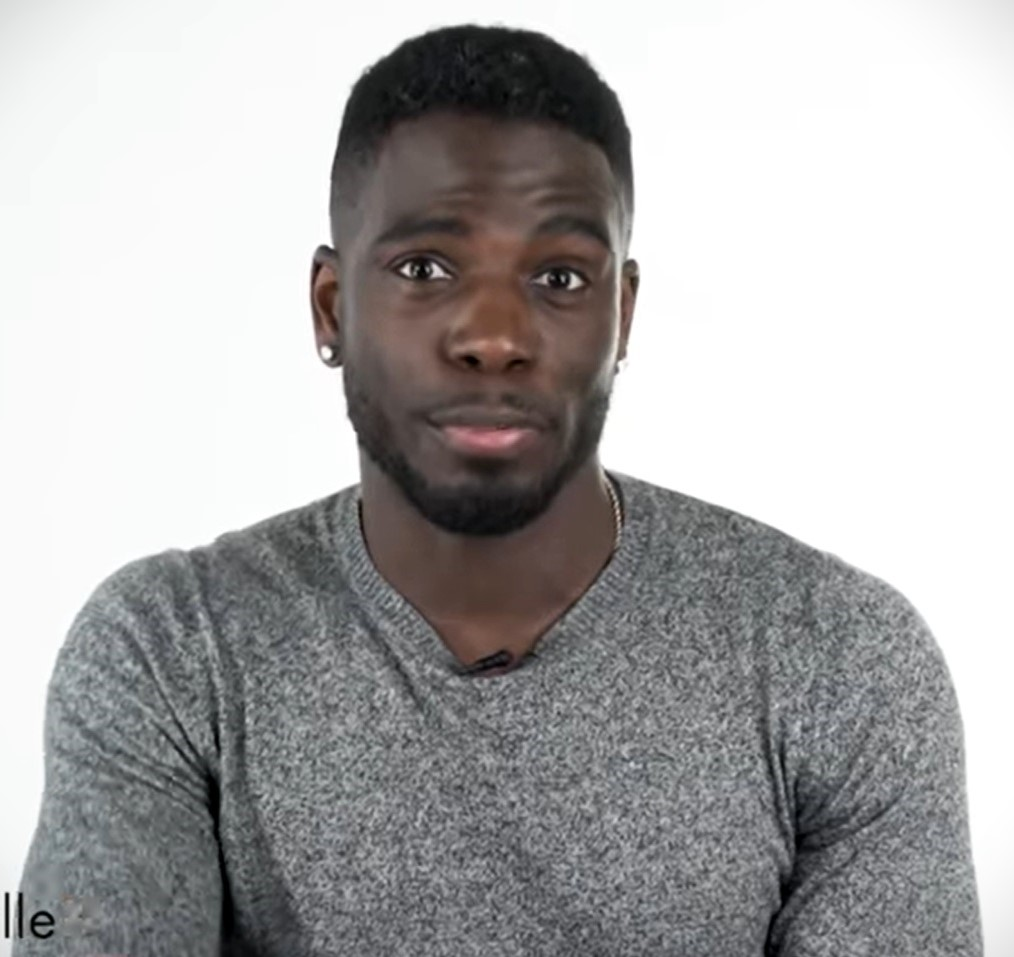
Marcel Somerville, Series 3

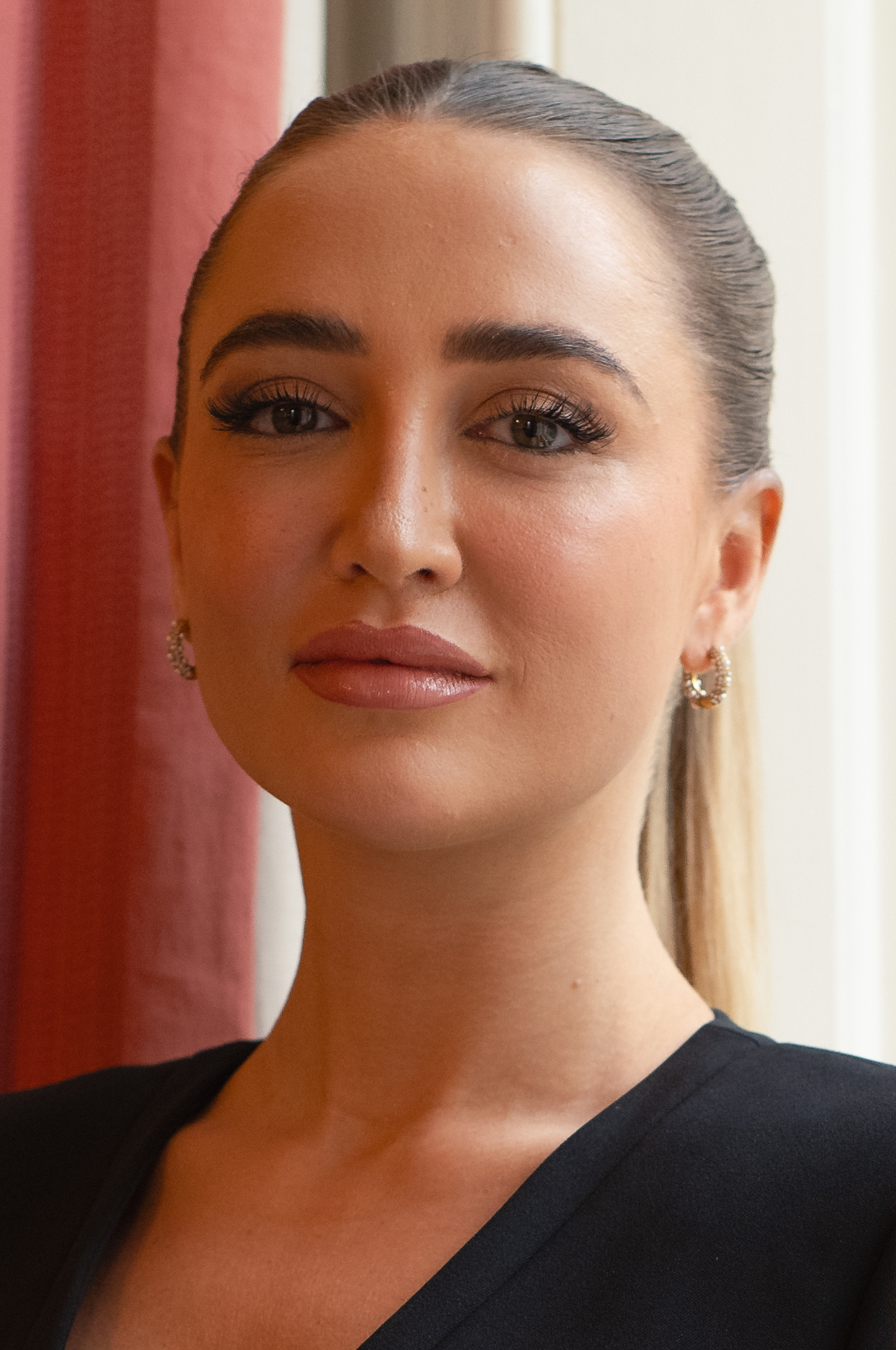
Georgia Harrison, Series 3

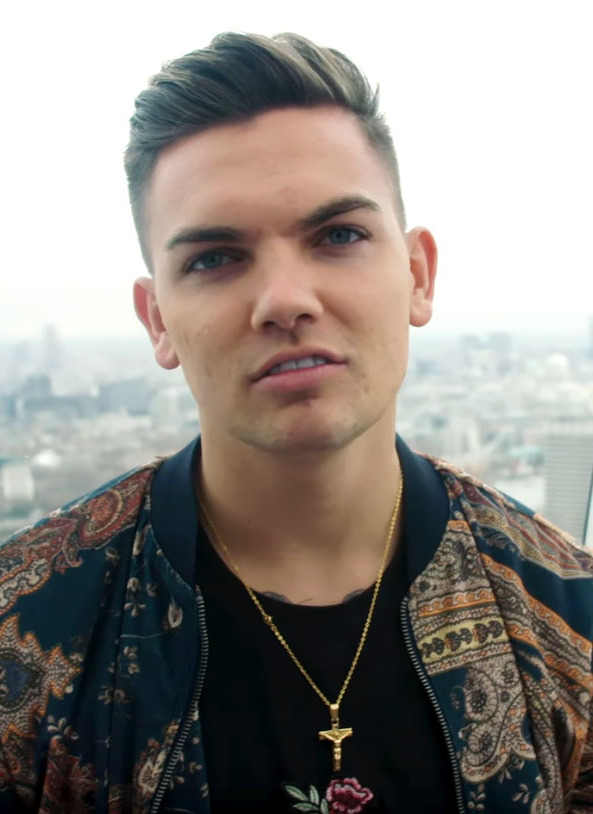
Sam Gowland, Series 3

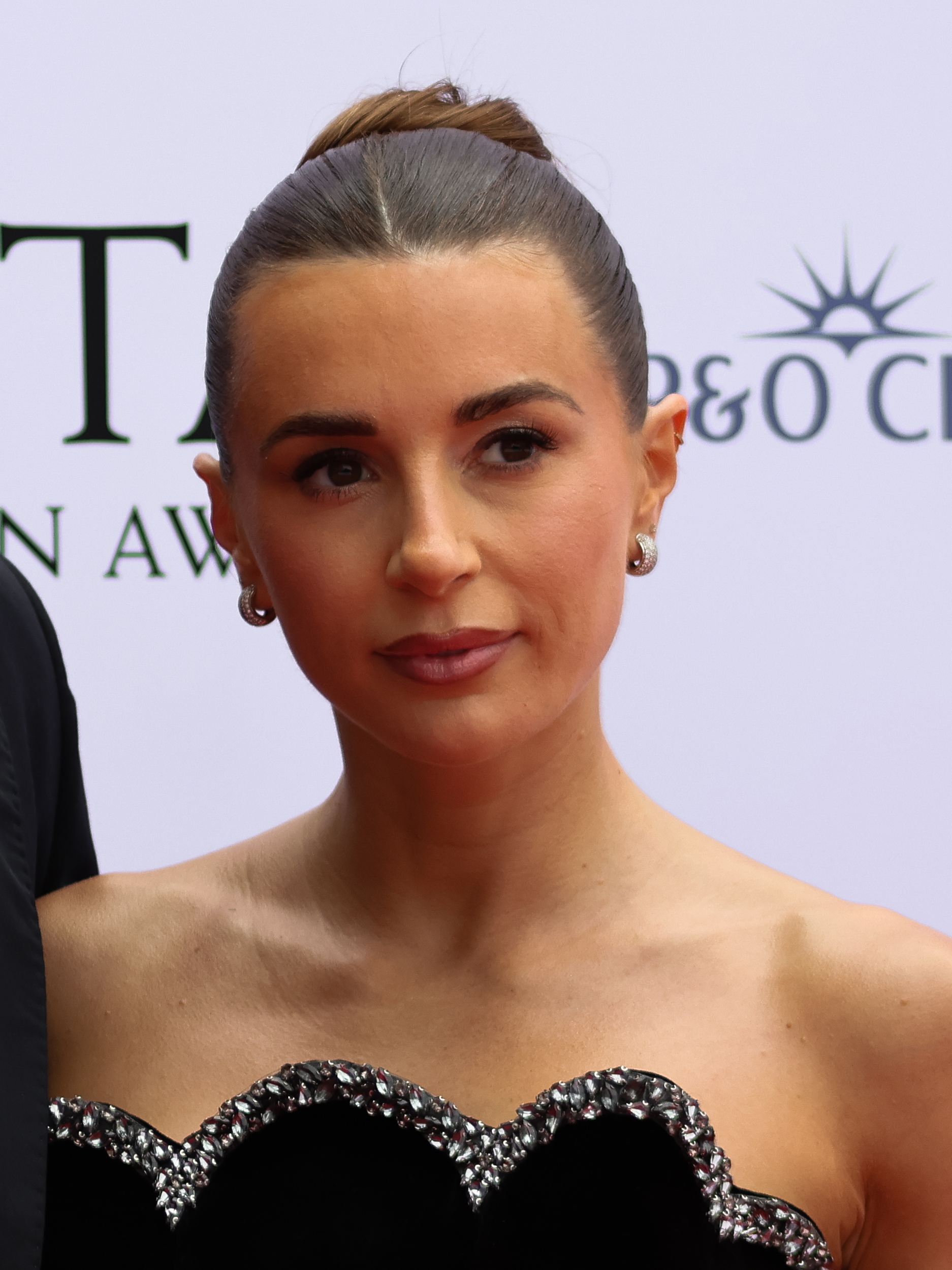
Dani Dyer, Series 4

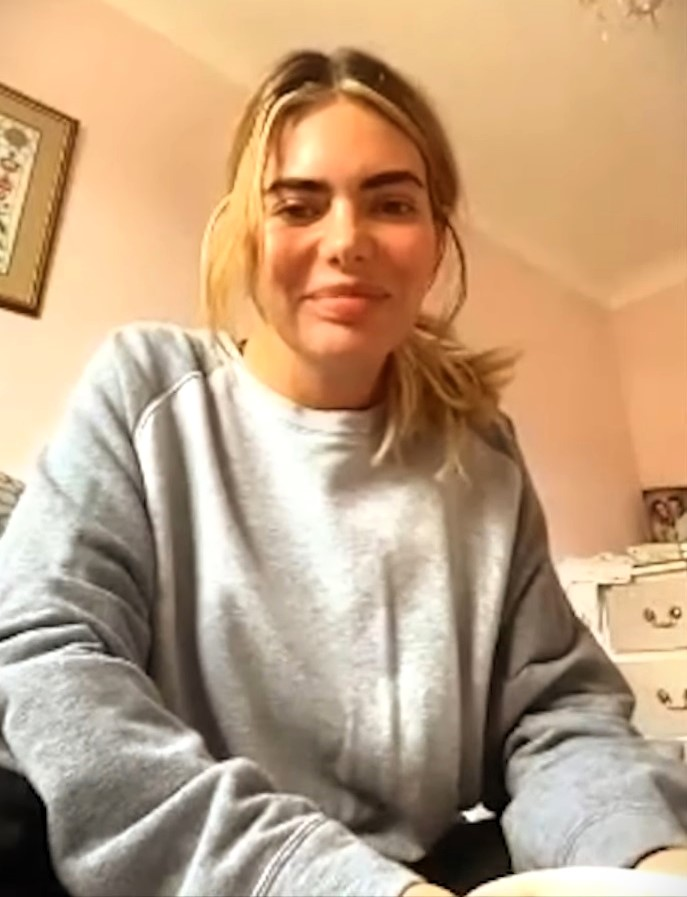
Megan Barton-Hanson, Series 4

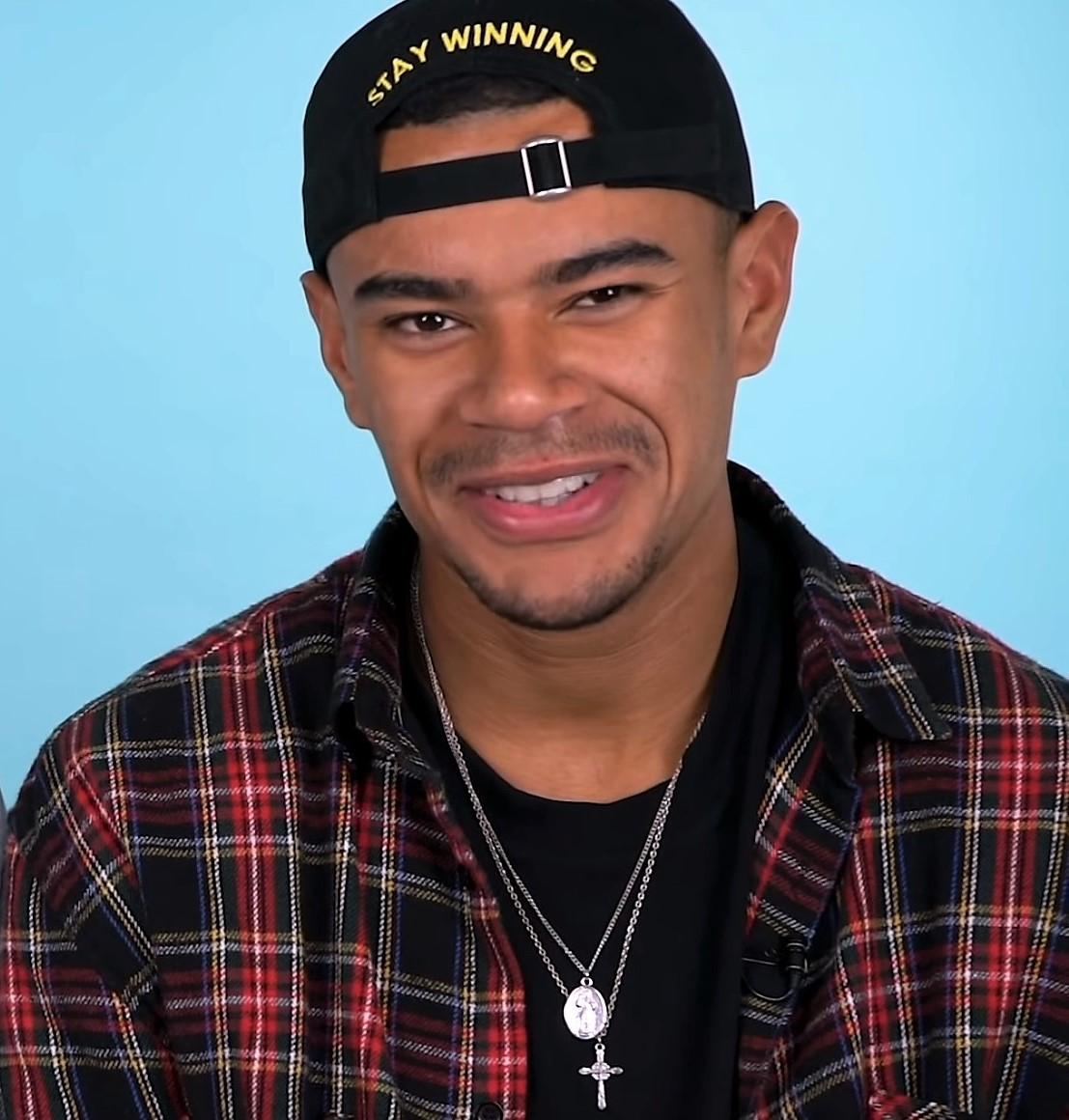
Wes Nelson, Series 4

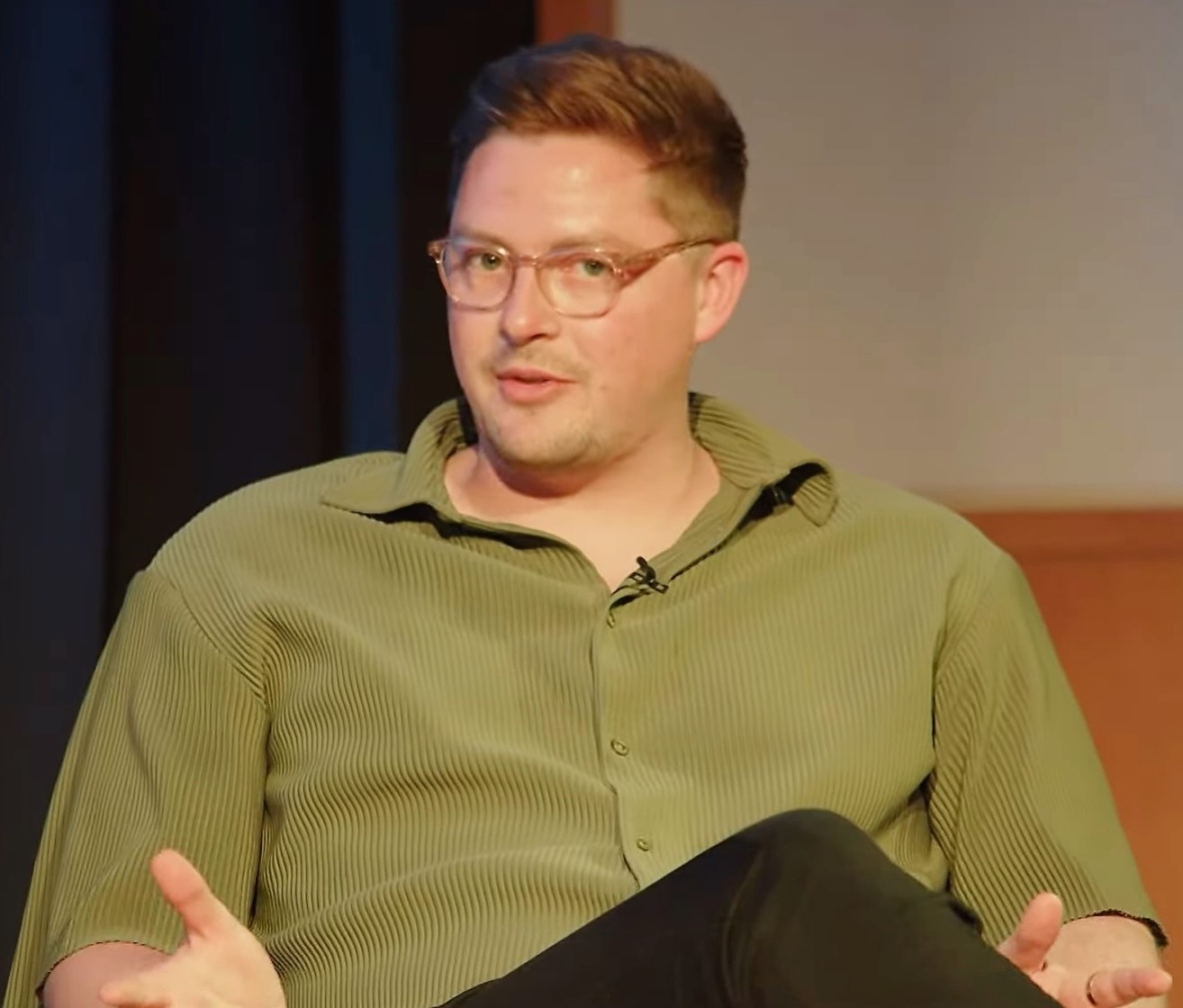
Alex George, Series 4

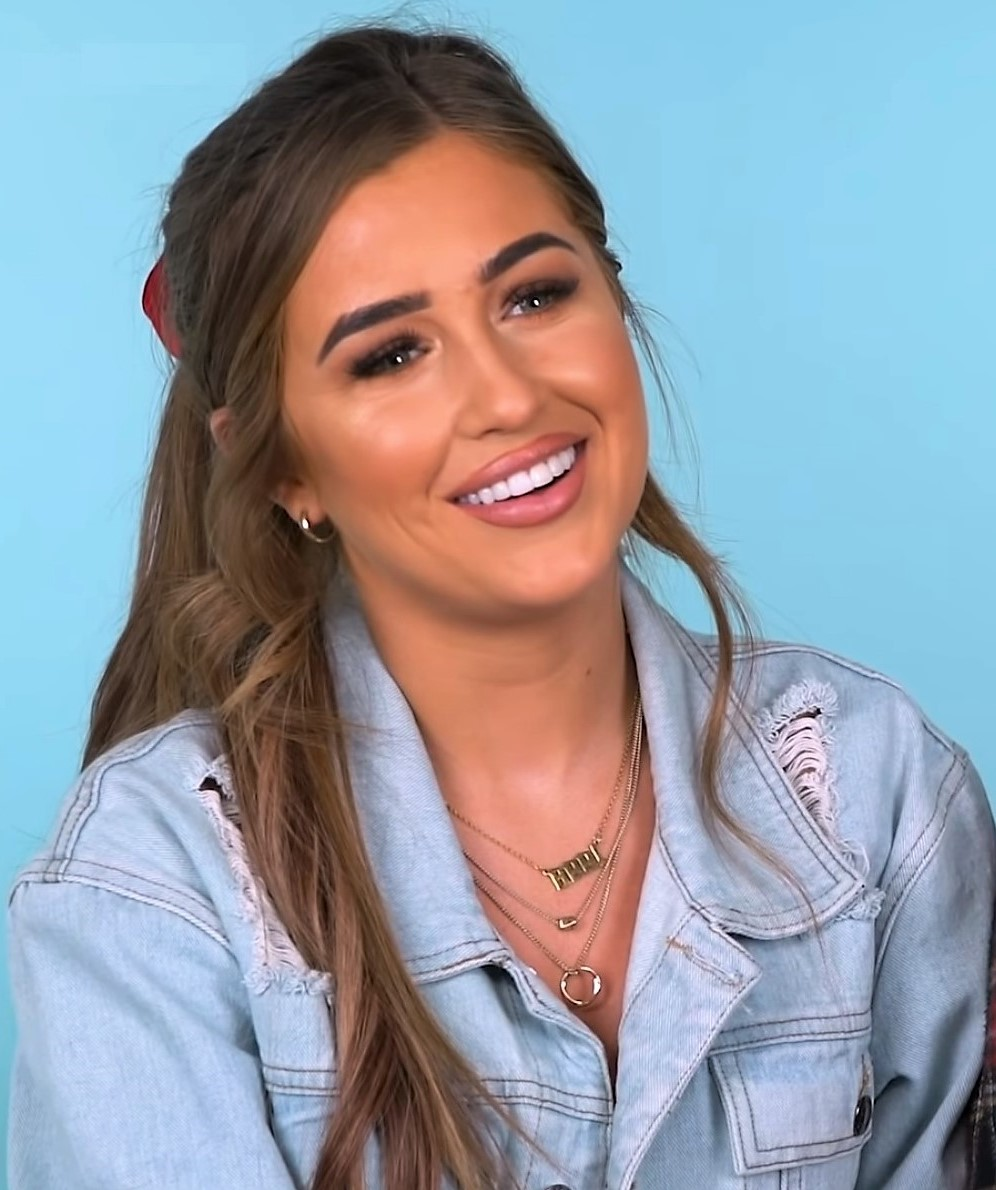
Georgia Steel, Series 4

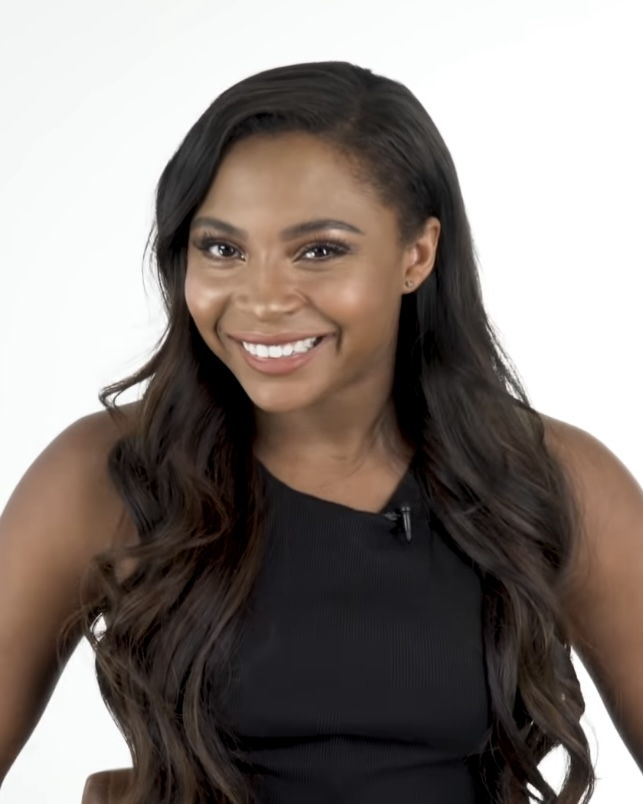
Samira Mighty, Series 4

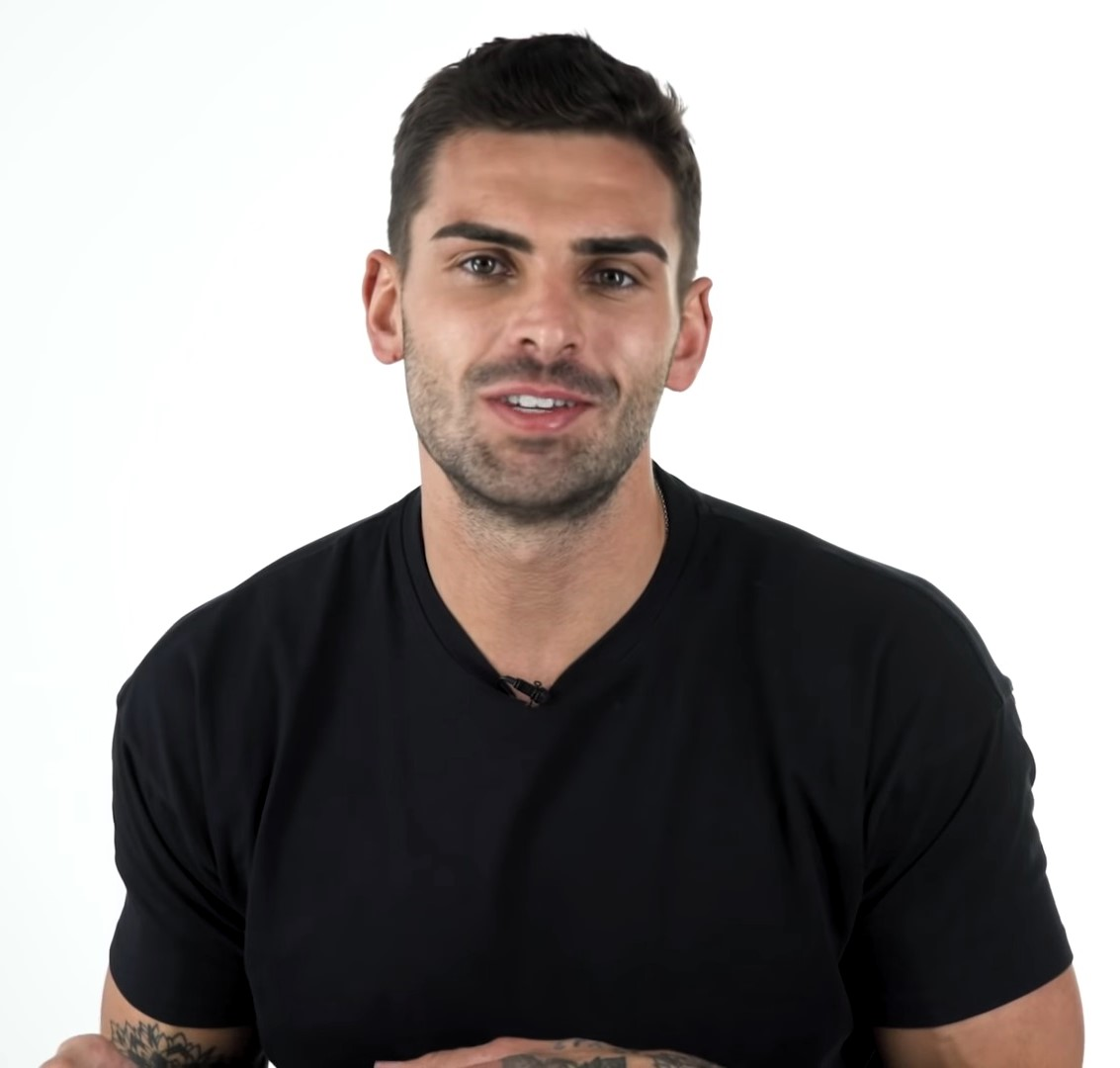
Adam Collard, Series 4, Series 8

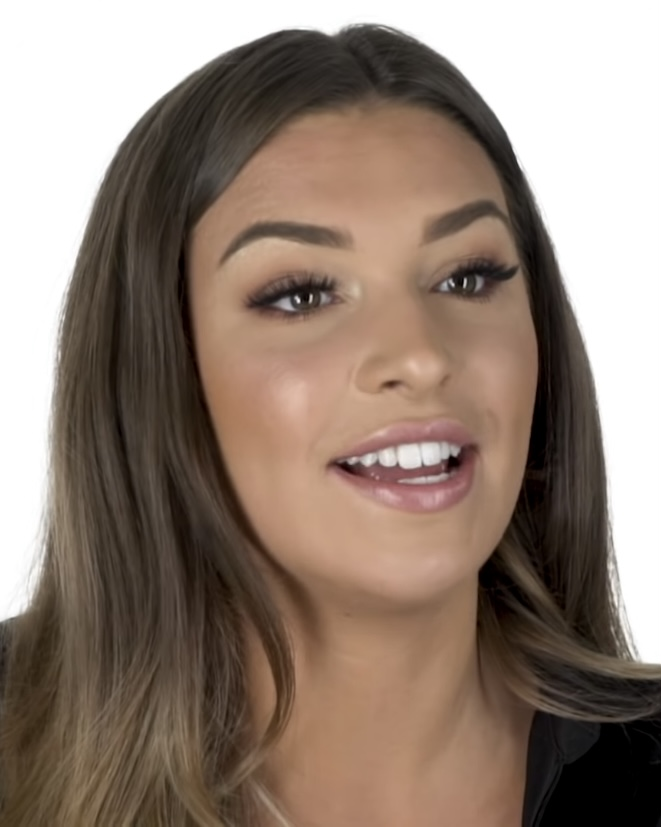
Zara McDermott, Series 4

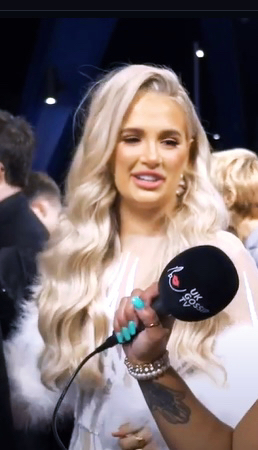
Molly-Mae Hague, Series 5

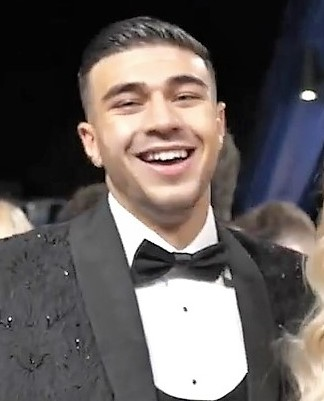
Tommy Fury, Series 5

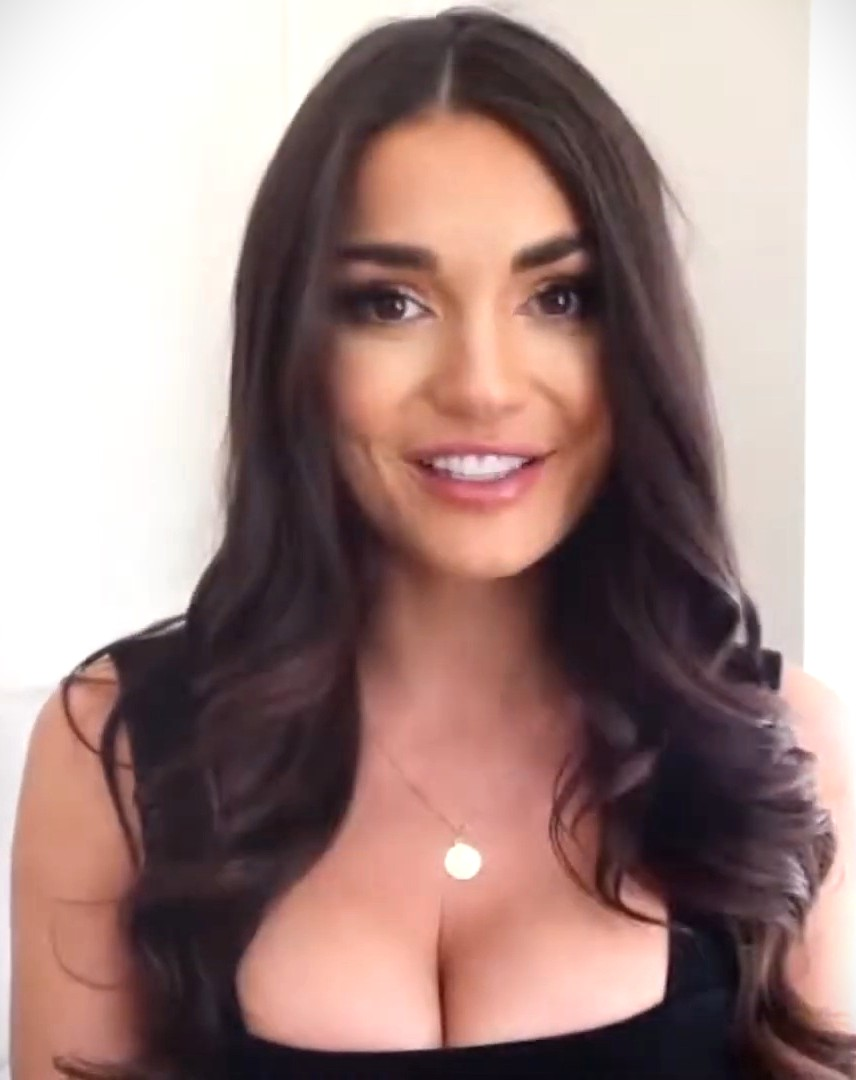
India Reynolds, Series 5

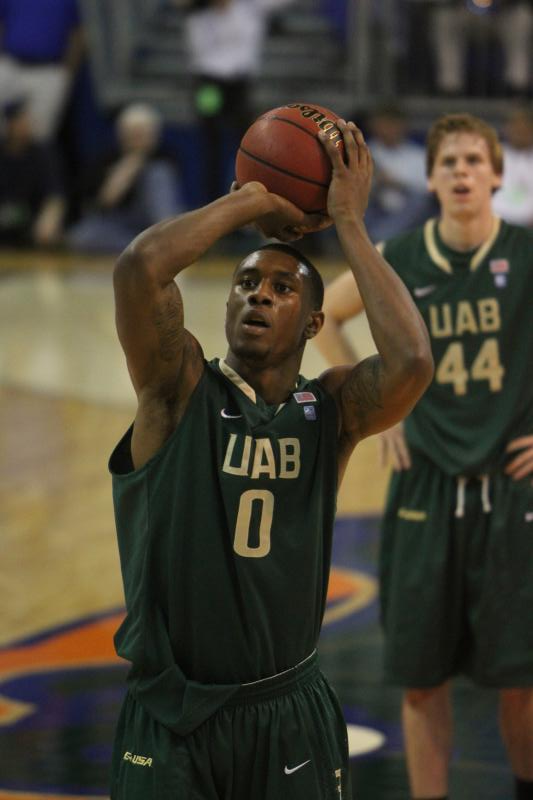
Ovie Soko, Series 5

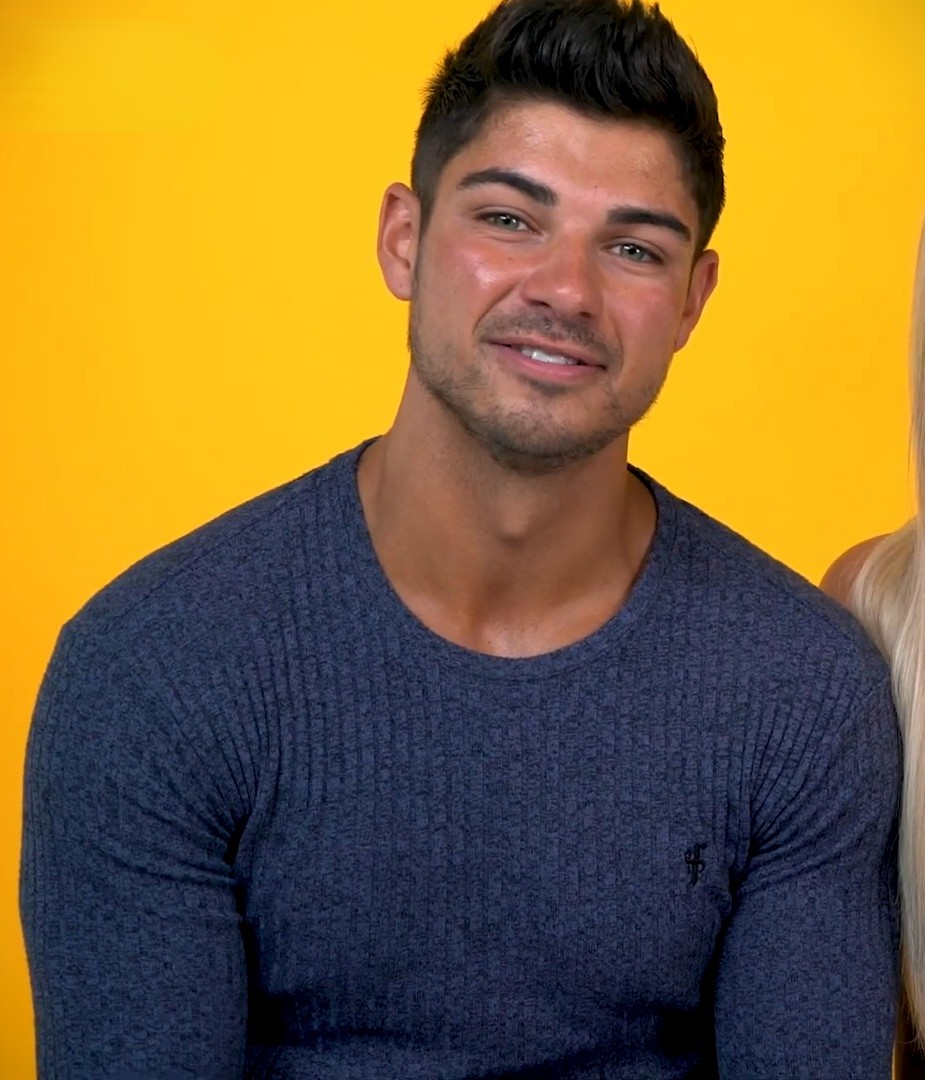
Anton Danyluk, Series 5

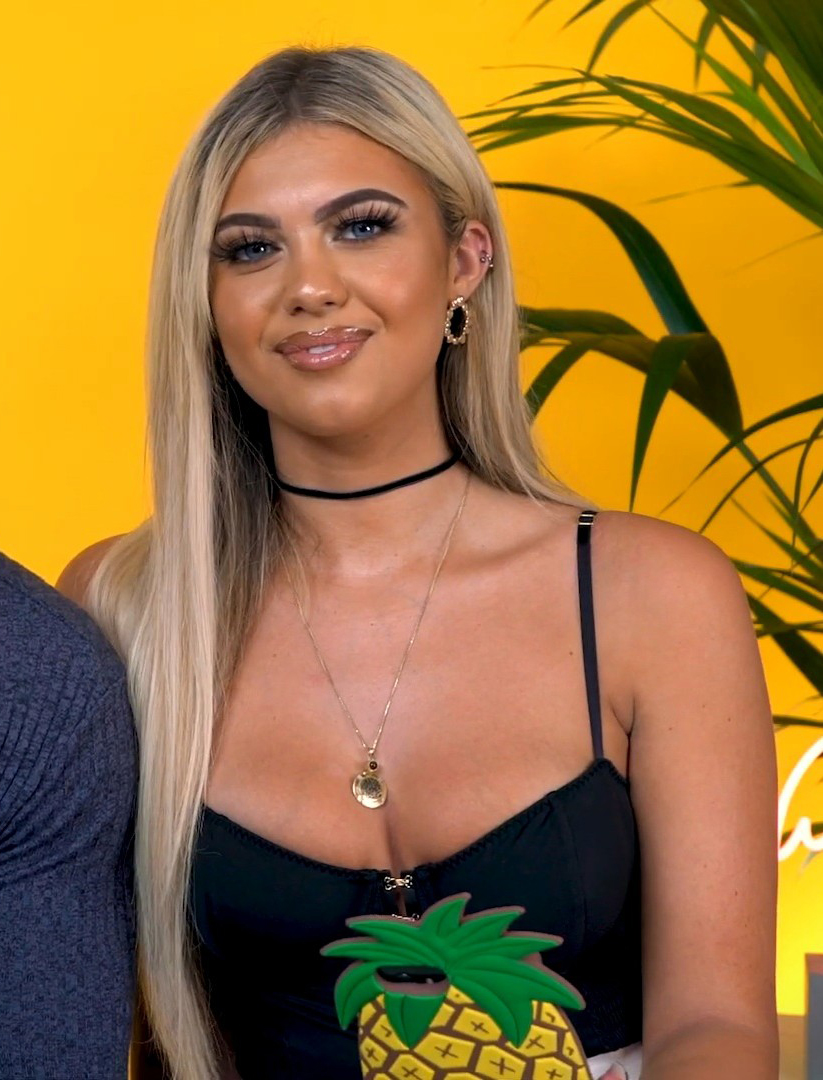
Belle Hassan, Series 5

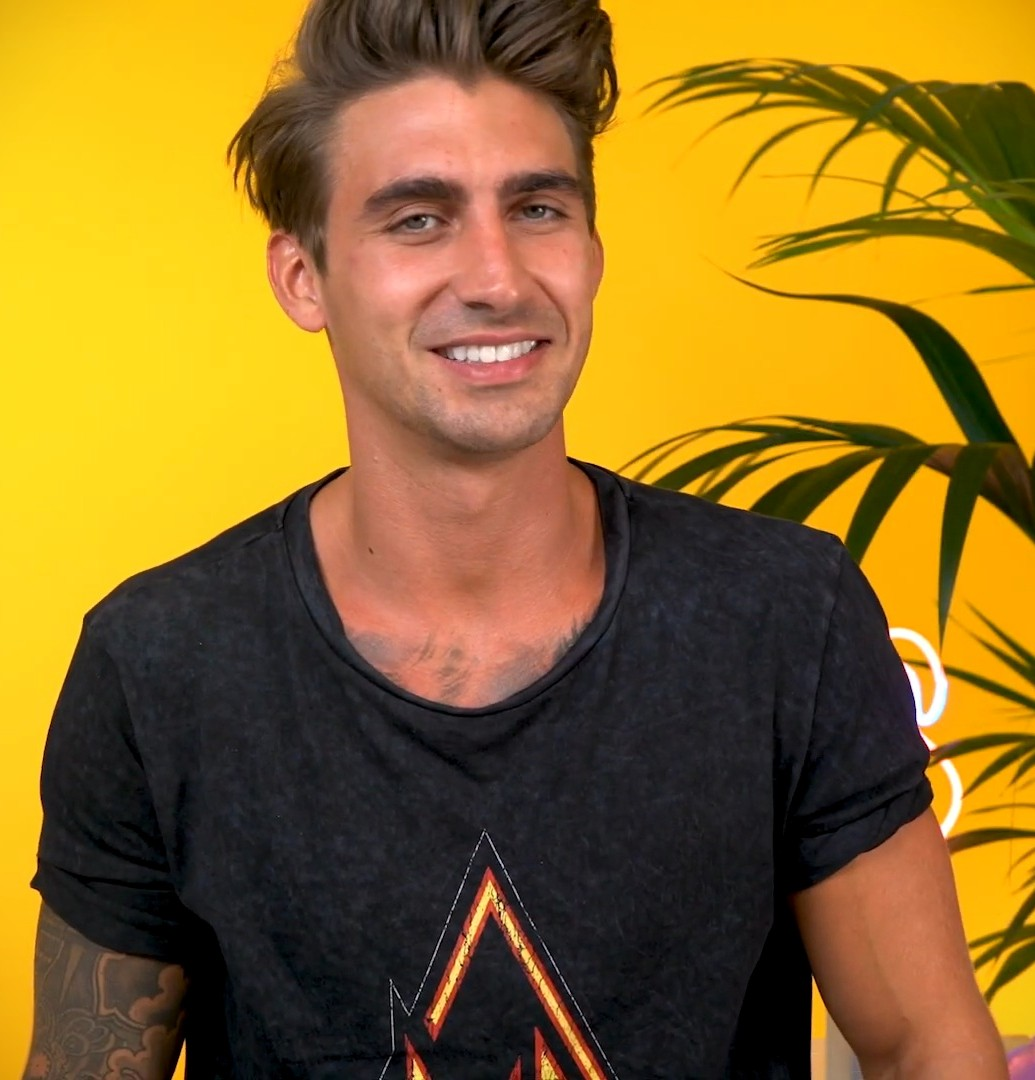
Chris Taylor, Series 5

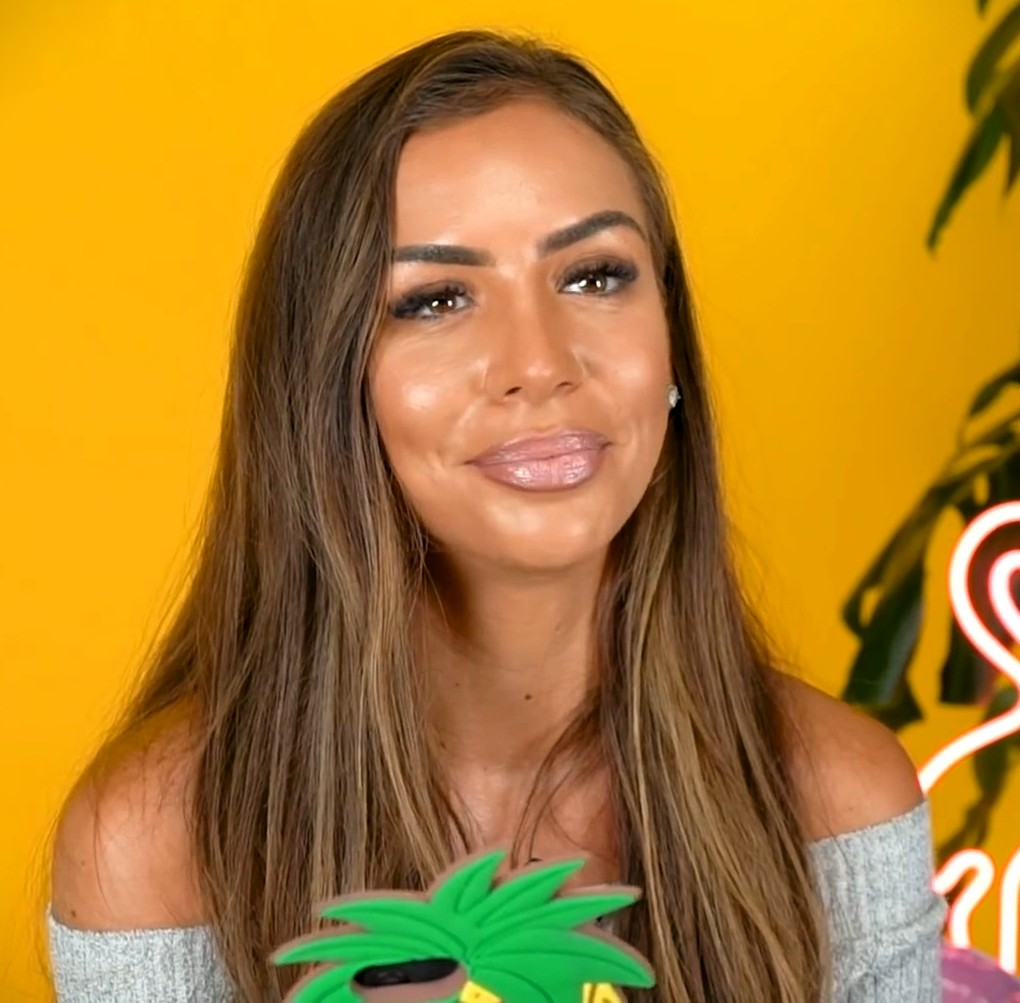
Elma Pazar, Series 5

Name	Age	Hometown	Occupation	Series	Status	Ref.
Jess Hayes	22	Oxford	Glamour model	1	Winner	
Max Morley	22	Huddersfield	Professional cricketer	1	Winner	
Hannah Elizabeth	25	Liverpool	Playboy bunny	1	Runner-up	
Jon Clark	25	Essex	Builder	1	Runner-up	
Josh Ritchie	21	Bolton	Joiner	1	Third place	
Lauren Richardson	26	East London	Community sports officer	1	Third place	
Luis Morrison	20	London	Events company owner	1	Fourth place	
Cally Jane Beech	23	Hull	Dental nurse	1	Fourth place	
Jordan Ring	31	Gloucester	Hotel groundsman	1	Dumped	
Zoe Basia Brown	24	South London	Model	1	Dumped	
Ben Porter	24	Wakefield	Junior manager	1	Dumped	
Poppy Farnan	22	Cheshire	Online boutique owner	1	Dumped	
Naomi Ball	23	East London	Operations manager	1	Dumped	
Travis Almond	22	Essex	Personal trainer and builder	1	Dumped	
Bethany Rogers	19	Leeds	Dancer	1	Dumped	
Omar Sultani	22	Warwickshire	Former IT recruiter	1	Dumped	
Daisy Muller	24	Birmingham	Glamour model	1	Dumped	
Chris Williamson	27	Newcastle	Model and club promoter	1	Dumped	
Chris Baxter	20	London	Personal trainer	1	Dumped	
Danielle Pyne	23	London	Marketing executive	1	Dumped	
Rachel Christie	26	London	Model and former athlete	1	Dumped	
John Alberti	29	Manchester	Property developer	1	Dumped	
Tony Alberti	29	Manchester	Property developer	1	Dumped	
Cara De La Hoyde	26	Kent	Circus performer	2	Winner	
Nathan Massey	25	Essex	Carpenter	2	Winner	
Alex Bowen	24	Birmingham	Scaffolder and model	2	Runner-up	
Olivia Buckland	22	Essex	Sales executive	2	Runner-up	
Kady McDermott	20	Stevenage	Make-up artist	2	Third place	
Scott Thomas	28	Manchester	Club promoter	2	Third place	
Adam Maxted	24	Belfast	Wrestler and personal trainer	2	Fourth place	
Katie Salmon	20	The Wirral	Glamour model	2	Fourth place	
Emma Jane Woodham	19	Oxford	Trainee project manager	2	Dumped	
Terry Walsh	28	Surrey	Carpenter	2	Dumped	
Adam Jukes	23	Manchester	Recruitment consultant	2	Dumped	
Lauren Whiteside	25	Blackpool	Events manager	2	Dumped	
Tina Stinnes	21	London	Business student	2	Dumped	
Sophie Gradon	30	Newcastle	Marketing manager	2	Walked	
Troy Frith	23	Kent	Salesman	2	Dumped	
Tom Powell	24	Port Talbot	Barman	2	Dumped	
Liana Isadora Van Riel	20	Exeter	Stripper	2	Dumped	
Oliver Maxwell Fernandez	25	Hertfordshire	Model	2	Dumped	
Malin Andersson	23	Milton Keynes	Make-up artist	2	Dumped	
Zara Holland	20	Hull	Model	2	Walked	
James Khan	20	Teddington	Newsagent and personal trainer	2	Dumped	
Rykard Jenkins	25	Kent	Personal trainer	2	Walked	
Daniel Lukakis	23	London	Physiotherapist	2	Dumped	
Rachel Fenton	23	Hampshire	Nurse	2	Dumped	
Malia Arkian	26	Manchester	Singer/songwriter	2	Removed	
Javi Shephard	27	York	Surveyor	2	Dumped	
Amber Davies	20	North Wales	Dancer	3	Winner	
Kem Cetinay	21	Essex	Hairdresser	3	Winner	
Camilla Thurlow	27	Dumfries	Explosive ordnance disposal	3	Runner-up	
Jamie Jewitt	27	Essex	Model	3	Runner-up	
Chris Hughes	24	Cheltenham	Golf clothing ambassador	3	Third place	
Olivia Attwood	26	Guildford	Motorsport grid girl	3	Third place	
Gabby Allen	25	Liverpool	Fitness instructor	3	Fourth place	
Marcel Somerville	31	London	Singer	3	Fourth place	
Alex Beattie	22	Newcastle	Personal trainer	3	Dumped	
Montana Brown	21	Hertfordshire	Student	3	Dumped	
Georgia Harrison	22	Essex	Personal assistant	3	Dumped	
Sam Gowland	21	Middlesbrough	Oil rig worker	3	Dumped	
Mike Thalassitis	24	North London	Footballer	3	Dumped	
Tyla Carr	23	Surrey	Model	3	Dumped	
Theo Campbell	24	Bath	Athlete	3	Dumped	
Jonny Mitchell	26	Essex	Business director	3	Dumped	
Craig Lawson	27	London	Personal trainer	3	Dumped	
Nathan Joseph	25	Essex	Salesman	3	Dumped	
Danielle Sellers	22	Hastings	Glamour model	3	Dumped	
Chyna Ellis	22	Essex	Fashion stylist	3	Dumped	
Amelia Peters	18	London	Teaching assistant and model	3	Dumped	
Dom Lever	26	Manchester	Careers adviser	3	Dumped	
Ellisha-Jade White	22	Southampton	Entrepreneur	3	Dumped	
Marino Katsouris	22	Brighton	Personal trainer	3	Dumped	
Rob Lipsett	25	Dublin	Entrepreneur and public speaker	3	Dumped	
Shannen McGrath	23	Dublin	Dental nurse and model	3	Dumped	
Steve Ball	25	Wiltshire	Plumber	3	Dumped	
Simon Searles	28	Leeds	Barber	3	Dumped	
Chloë Crowhurst	22	Essex	Executive assistant	3	Dumped	
Jessica Shears	23	Devon	Glamour model	3	Dumped	
Tyne-Lexy Clarson	20	Birmingham	Student	3	Dumped	
Harley Judge	22	Norwich	Groundsworker	3	Dumped	
Dani Dyer	21	East London	Barmaid	4	Winner	
Jack Fincham	26	Kent	Sales manager	4	Winner	
Laura Anderson	29	Stirling	Cabin crew	4	Runner-up	
Paul Knops	31	Bournemouth	Carpenter and model	4	Runner-up	
Josh Denzel	26	London	Social media host	4	Third place	
Kazimir Crossley	23	London	Make-up artist	4	Third place	
Megan Barton-Hanson	24	Essex	Model	4	Fourth place	
Wes Nelson	20	Staffordshire	Design engineer	4	Fourth place	
Alex George	27	Carmarthen	Doctor	4	Dumped	
Alexandra Cane	27	Hertfordshire	Make-up artist	4	Dumped	
Jack Fowler	22	London	Semi professional footballer	4	Dumped	
Laura Crane	23	Devon	Surfer	4	Dumped	
Josh Mair	21	Birmingham	DJ	4	Dumped	
Stephanie Lam	23	Hertfordshire	Accounts manager	4	Dumped	
Georgia Steel	20	York	Student	4	Dumped	
Sam Bird	25	Norwich	Entrepreneur	4	Dumped	
Charlie Brake	23	Chelsea	Socialite	4	Dumped	
Ellie Brown	20	Newcastle	Business development manager	4	Dumped	
Idris Virgo	25	Birmingham	Professional boxer	4	Dumped	
Kieran Nicholls	26	London	Personal trainer	4	Dumped	
Samira Mighty	22	London	West End performer	4	Walked	
Frankie Foster	22	Cheltenham	Student and fitness coach	4	Dumped	
Grace Wardle	25	London	Hairdresser	4	Dumped	
Darylle Sargeant	24	Watford	Eyebrow technician	4	Dumped	
Ellie Jones	22	Kent	Office administrator	4	Dumped	
Adam Collard	22	Newcastle	Personal trainer	4	Dumped	
Alex Miller	28	Essex	Structural glazier	4	Dumped	
Charlie Williams	24	Bath	Tanning shop assistant	4	Dumped	
Dean Overson	25	Burnley	Car sales executive	4	Dumped	
Jordan Adefeyisan	23	Stockport	Model	4	Dumped	
Savanna Darnell	22	Sheffield	Singer and dancer	4	Dumped	
Zara McDermott	21	Essex	Government advisor	4	Dumped	
Eyal Booker	22	London	Model	4	Dumped	
Rosie Williams	26	South Wales	Lawyer	4	Dumped	
Charlie Frederick	23	Plymouth	Model	4	Dumped	
Hayley Hughes	21	Liverpool	Model	4	Dumped	
Niall Aslam	23	Coventry	Student and construction worker	4	Walked	
Kendall Rae-Knight	26	Blackpool	Retail manager	4	Dumped	
Amber Gill	21	Newcastle	Beauty therapist	5	Winner	
Greg O'Shea	24	County Limerick	Professional rugby sevens player	5	Winner	
Molly-Mae Hague	20	Hertfordshire	Social media influencer	5	Runner-up	
Tommy Fury	20	Manchester	Professional boxer	5	Runner-up	
India Reynolds	28	Reading	Model	5	Third place	
Ovie Soko	28	London	Professional basketball player	5	Third place	
Curtis Pritchard	23	Shropshire	Ballroom dancer	5	Fourth place	
Maura Higgins	28	County Longford	Model and grid girl	5	Fourth place	
Anton Danyluk	24	Airdrie	Gym owner	5	Dumped	
Belle Hassan	21	Bromley	Make-up artist	5	Dumped	
Anna Vakili	28	London	Pharmacist	5	Dumped	
Jordan Hames	24	Manchester	Model	5	Dumped	
Chris Taylor	28	Leicester	Business developer	5	Dumped	
Harley Brash	20	Newcastle	Estate agent	5	Dumped	
Francesca Allen	23	Essex	Clothing store manager	5	Dumped	
Michael Griffiths	27	Liverpool	Firefighter	5	Dumped	
Joanna Chimonides	22	London	Recruitment consultant	5	Dumped	
Marvin Brooks	29	Poole	Personal trainer	5	Dumped	
Amy Hart	26	Worthing	Air hostess	5	Walked	
George Rains	22	Essex	Builder	5	Dumped	
Lucie Donlan	21	Newquay	Surfer	5	Dumped	
Danny Williams	21	Hull	Model	5	Dumped	
Jourdan Riane	24	London	Model and actress	5	Dumped	
Dan Rose	21	Nuneaton	Bathroom salesman	5	Dumped	
Dennon Lewis	22	Watford	Footballer	5	Dumped	
Lavena Back	23	Croydon	Business developer	5	Dumped	
Maria Wild	22	Cheltenham	VIP host	5	Dumped	
Nabila Badda	29	London	Hostess	5	Dumped	
Stevie Bradley	21	Isle of Man	Student	5	Dumped	
Arabella Chi	28	London	Model	5	Dumped	
Tom Walker	29	Leeds	Model	5	Dumped	
Yewande Biala	23	Dublin	Scientist	5	Dumped	
Joe Garratt	22	London	Catering company owner	5	Dumped	
Elma Pazar	26	Essex	Eyelash technician	5	Dumped	
Sherif Lanre	20	London	Chef	5	Removed	
Callum Macleod	28	South Wales	Aircraft engineer	5	Dumped	

== Series 6–10 (2020–2023) ==
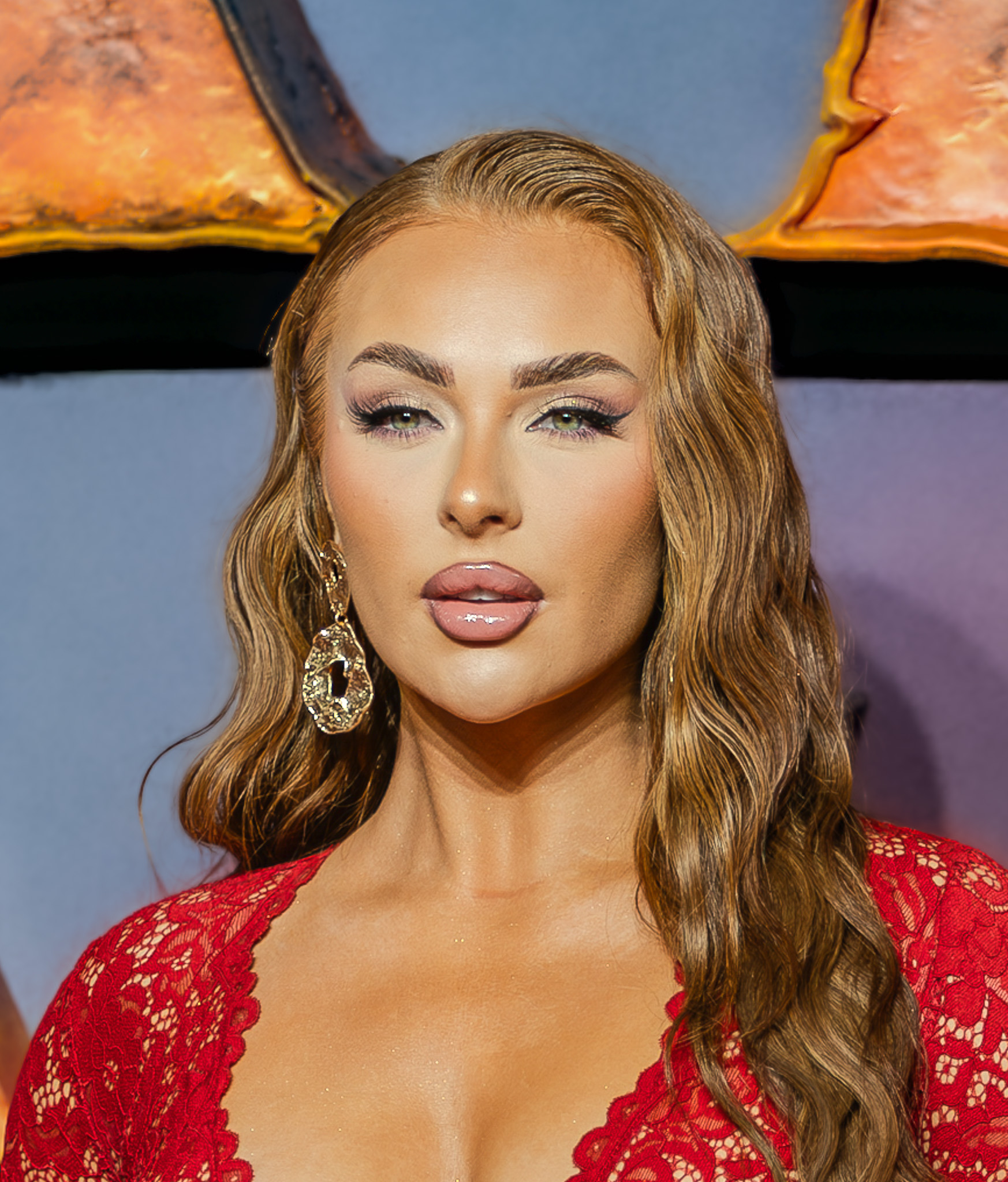
Demi Jones, Series 6

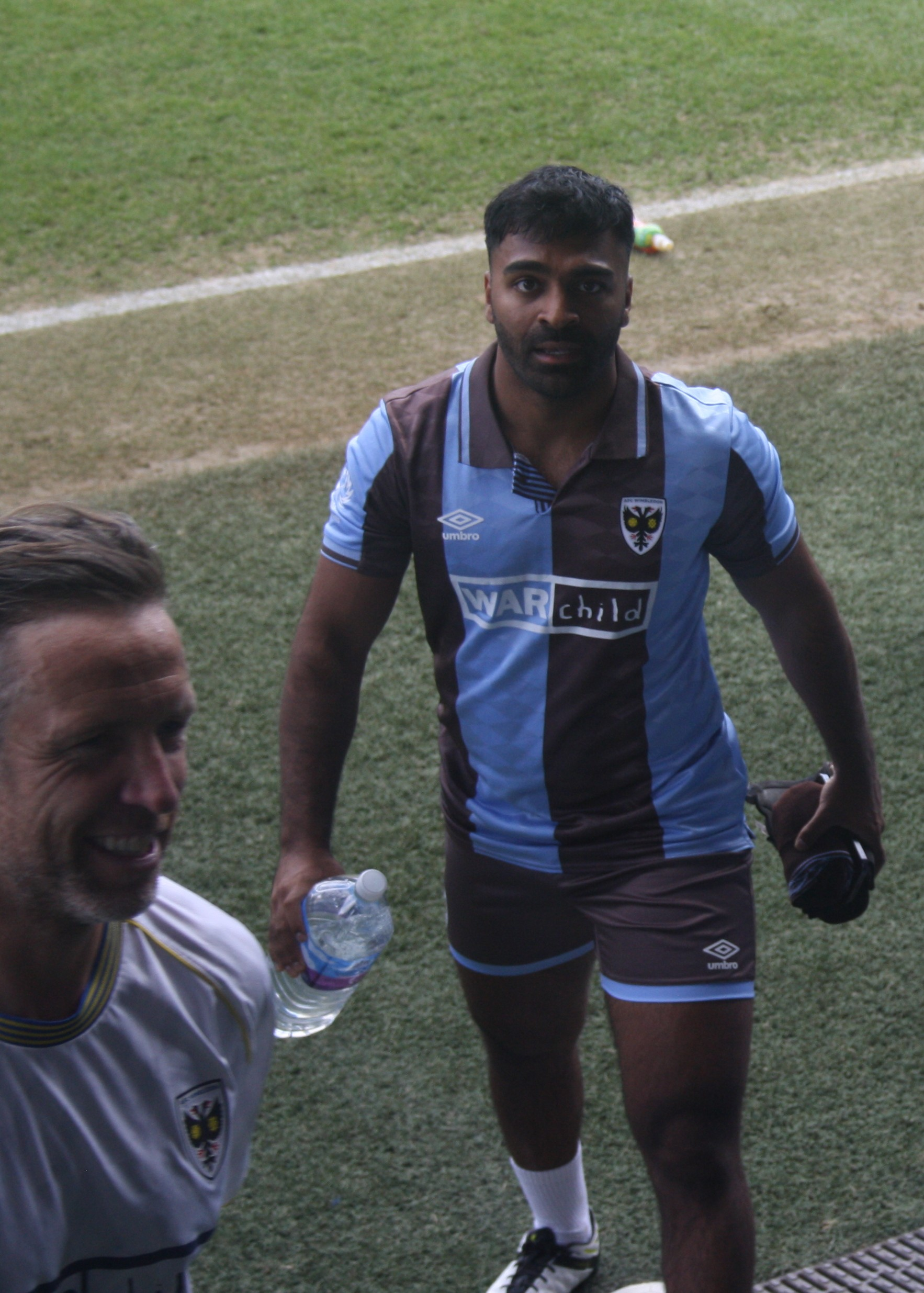
Nas Majeed, Series 6

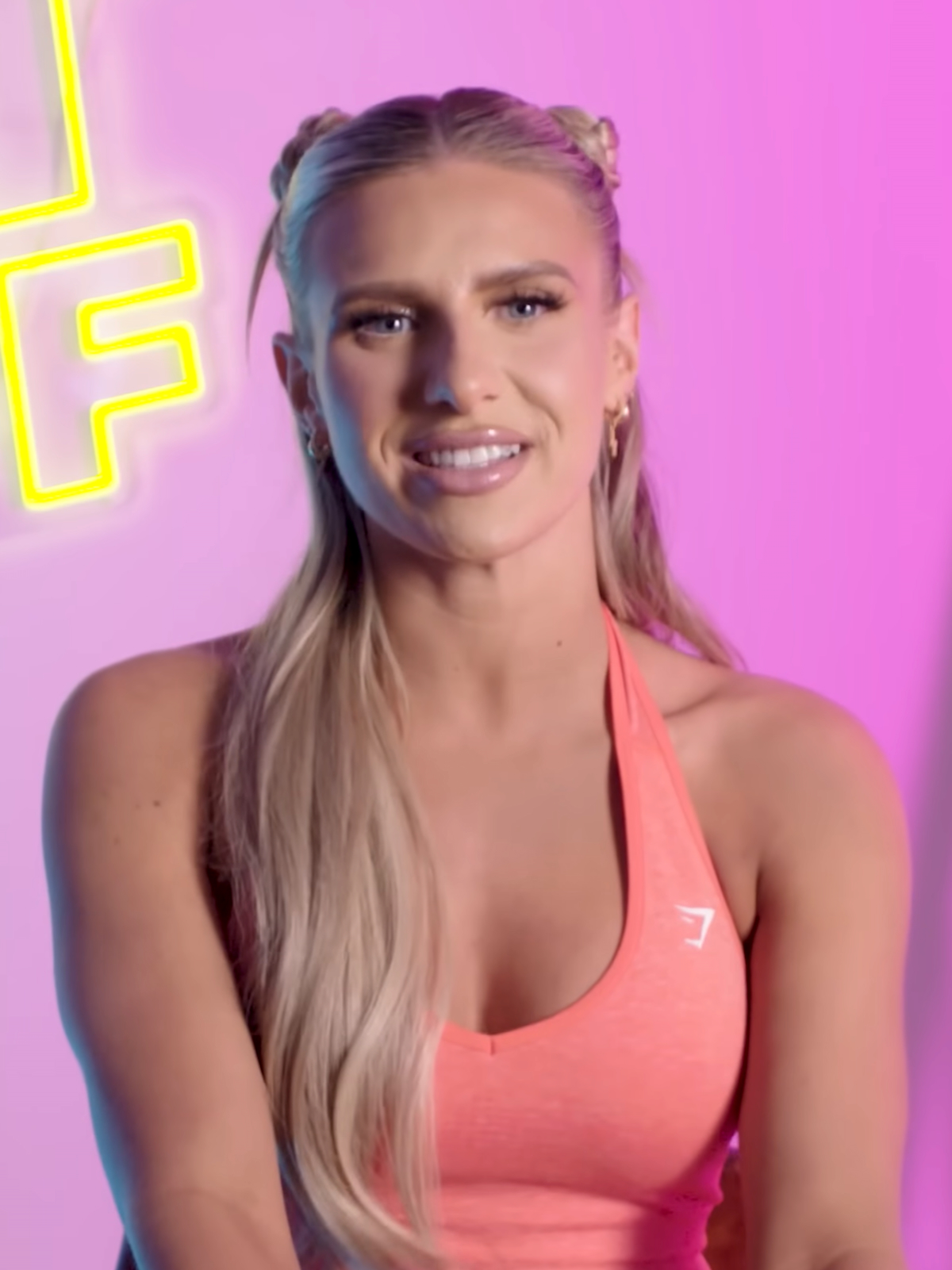
Chloe Burrows, Series 7

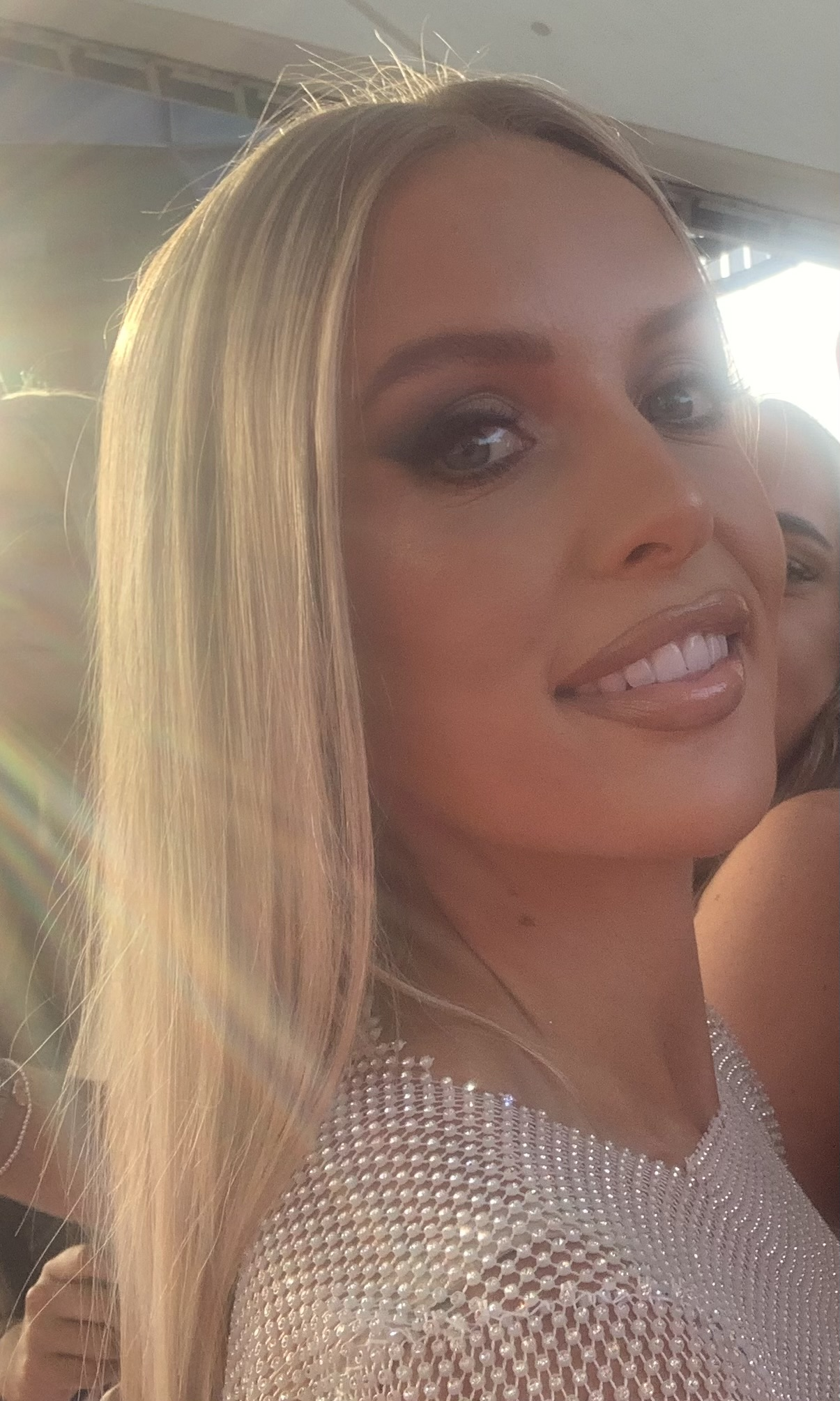
Faye Winter, Series 7

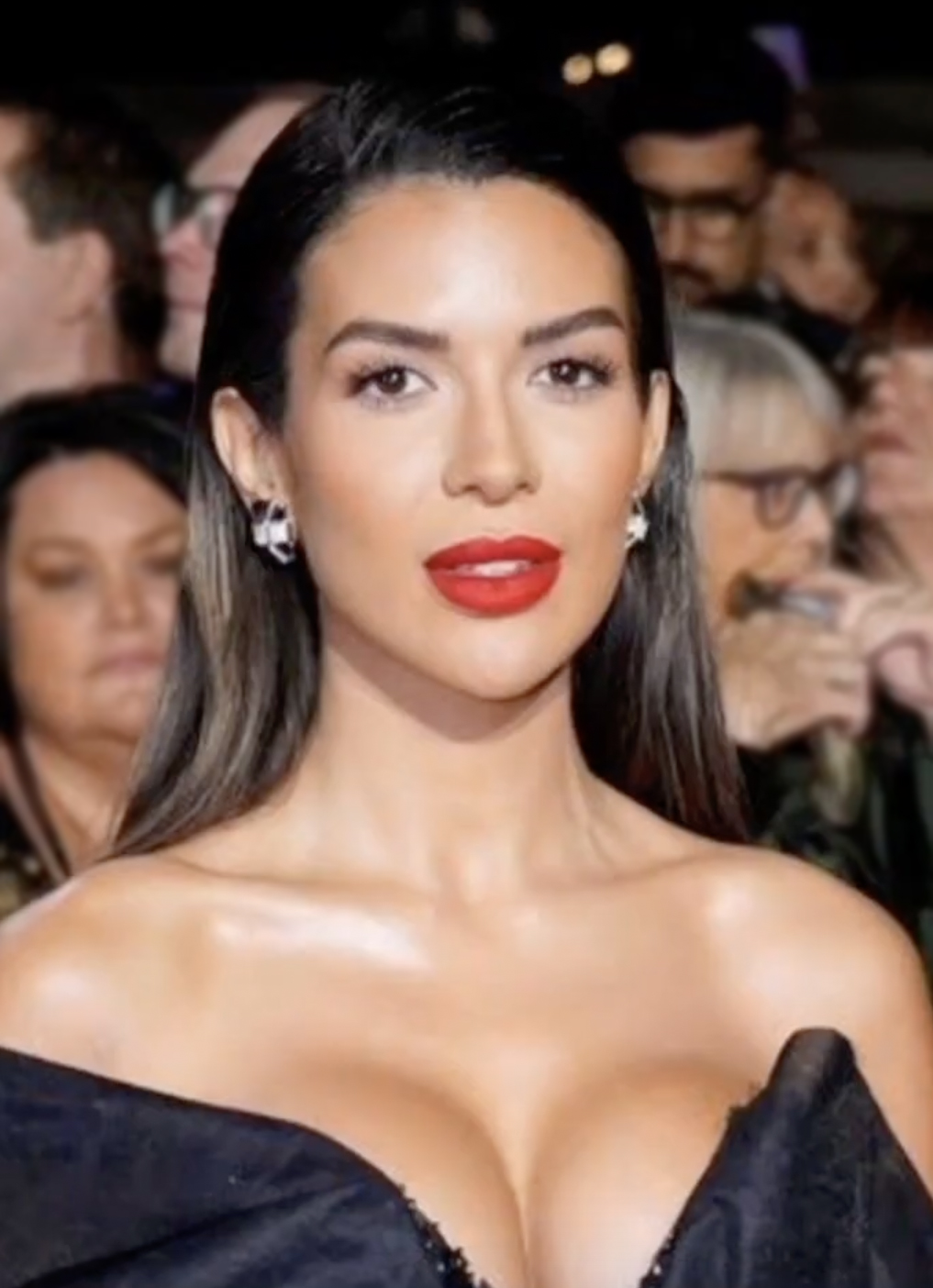
Ekin-Su Cülcüloğlu, Series 8

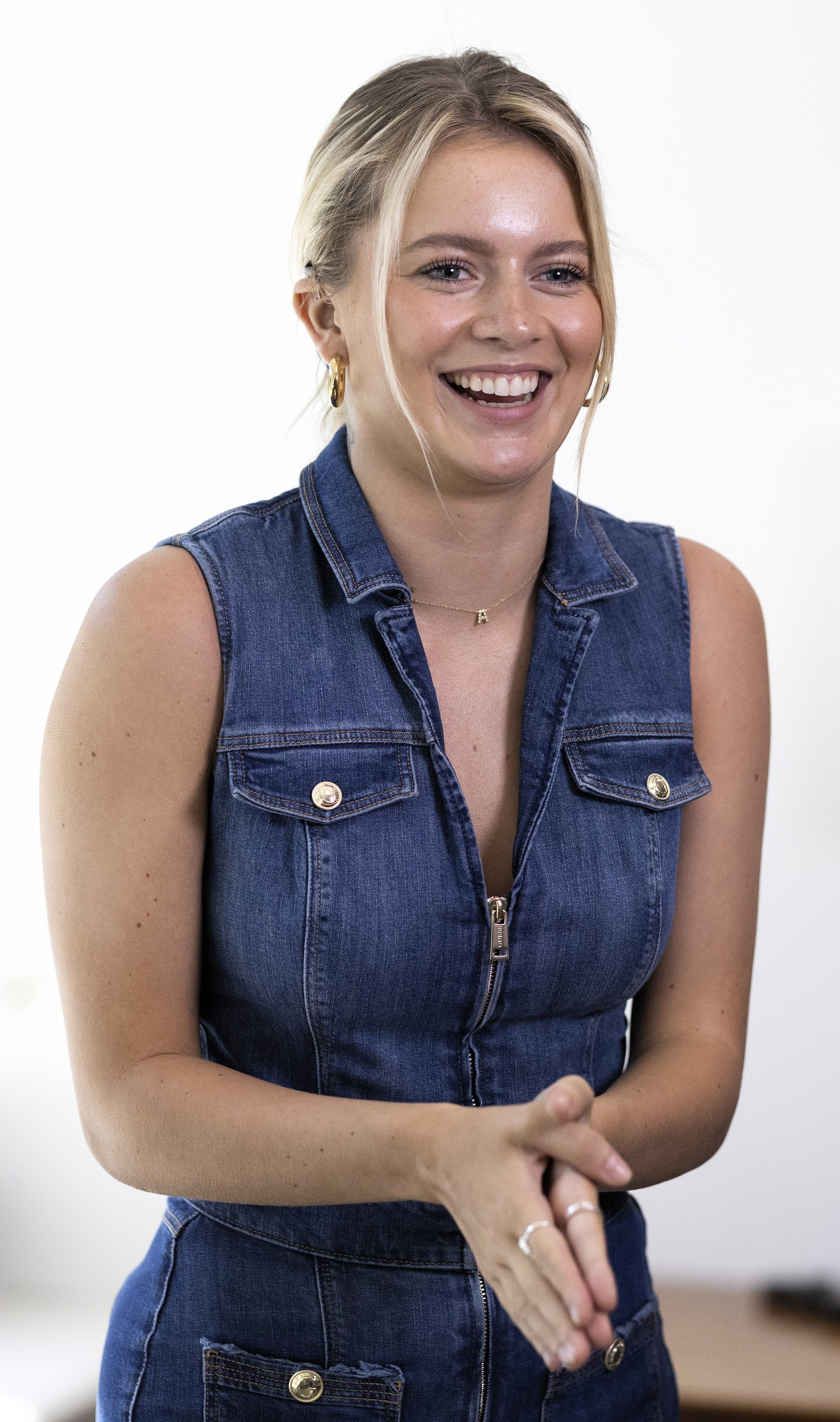
Tasha Ghouri, Series 8

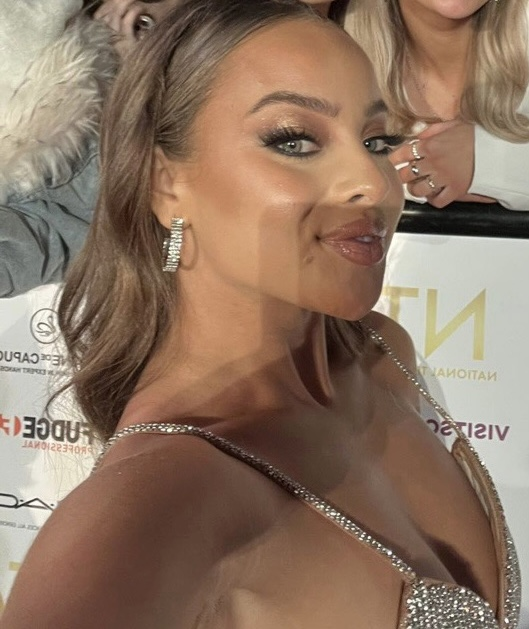
Danica Taylor, Series 8

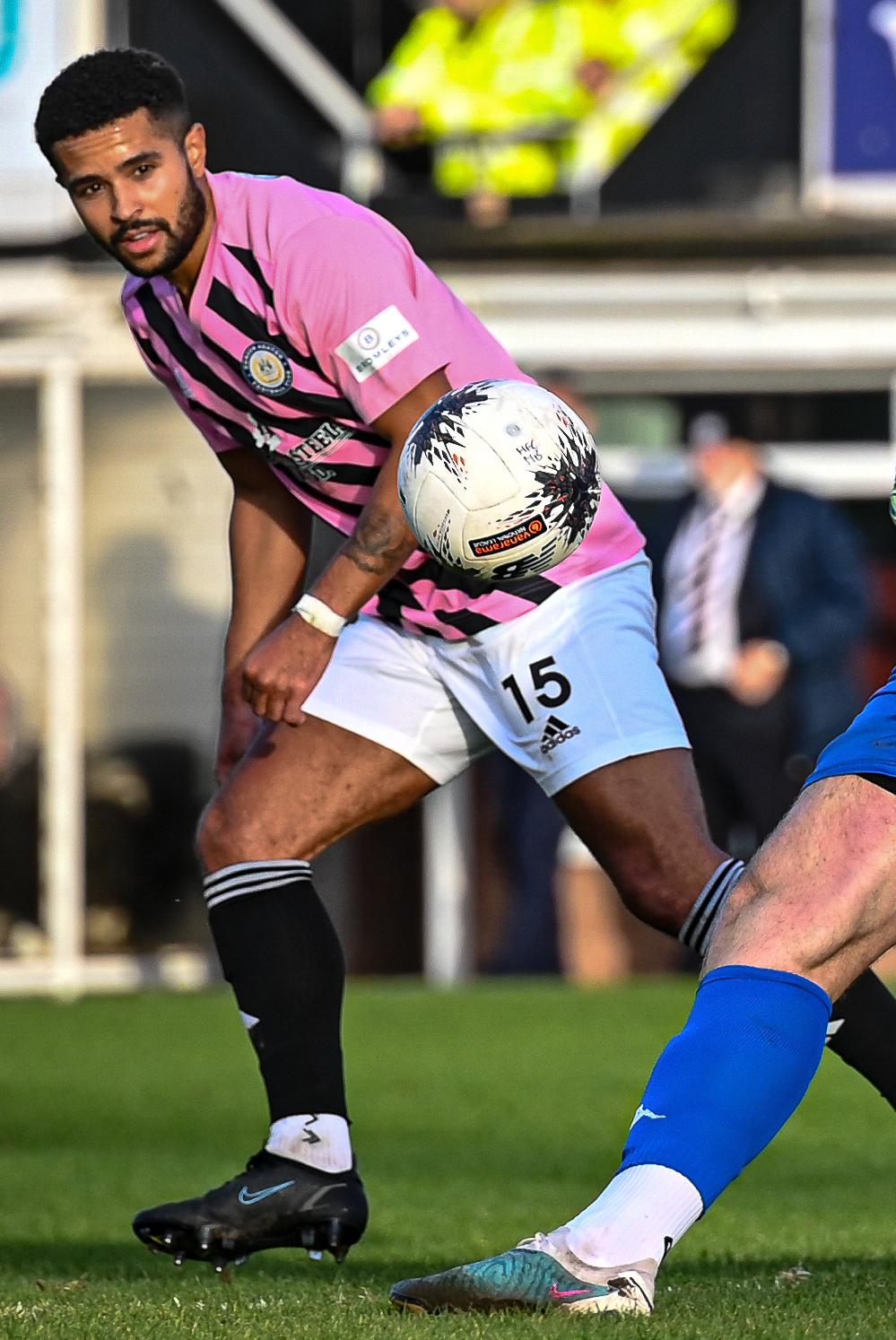
Jamie Allen, Series 8

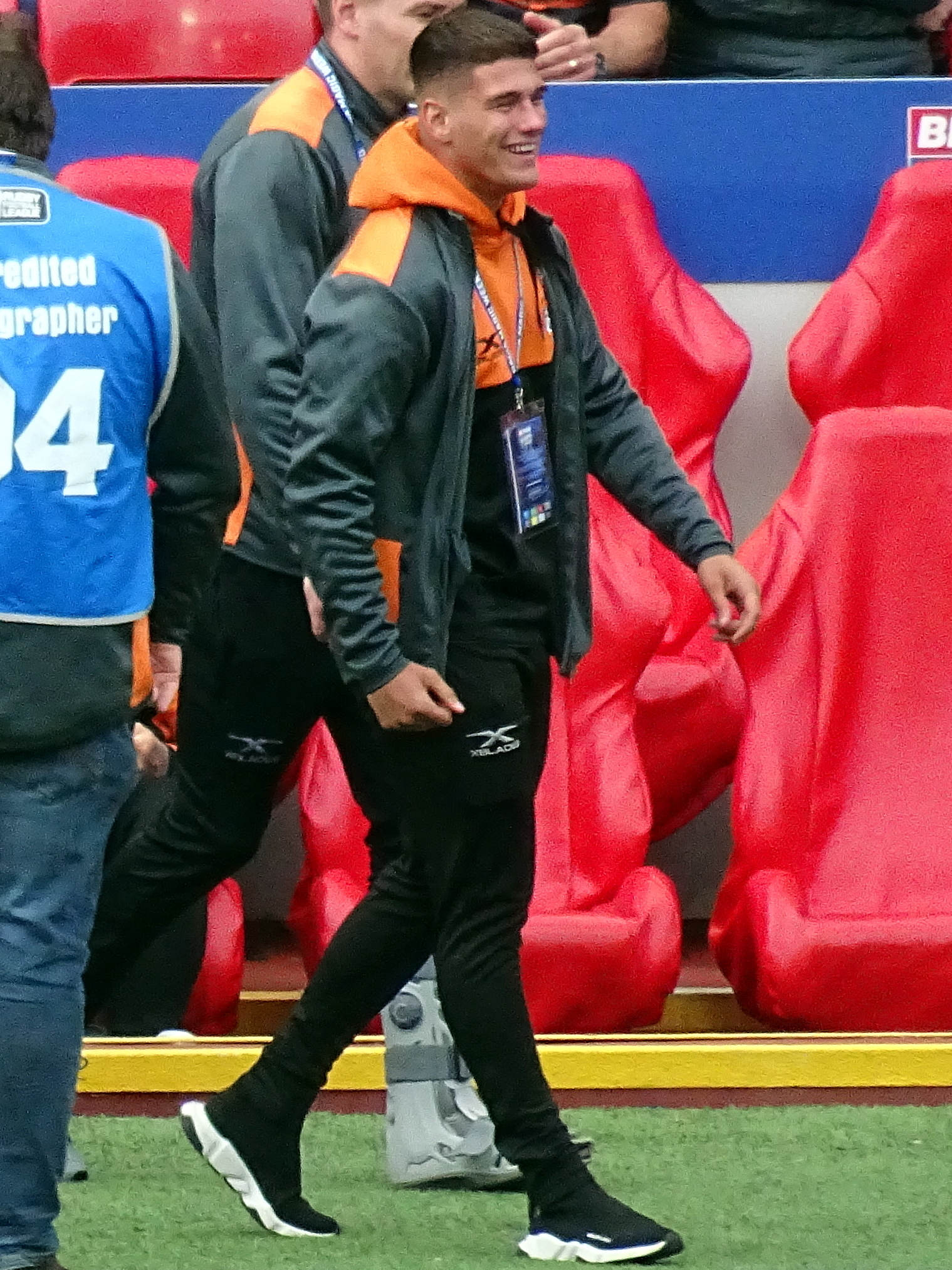
Jacques O'Neill, Series 8

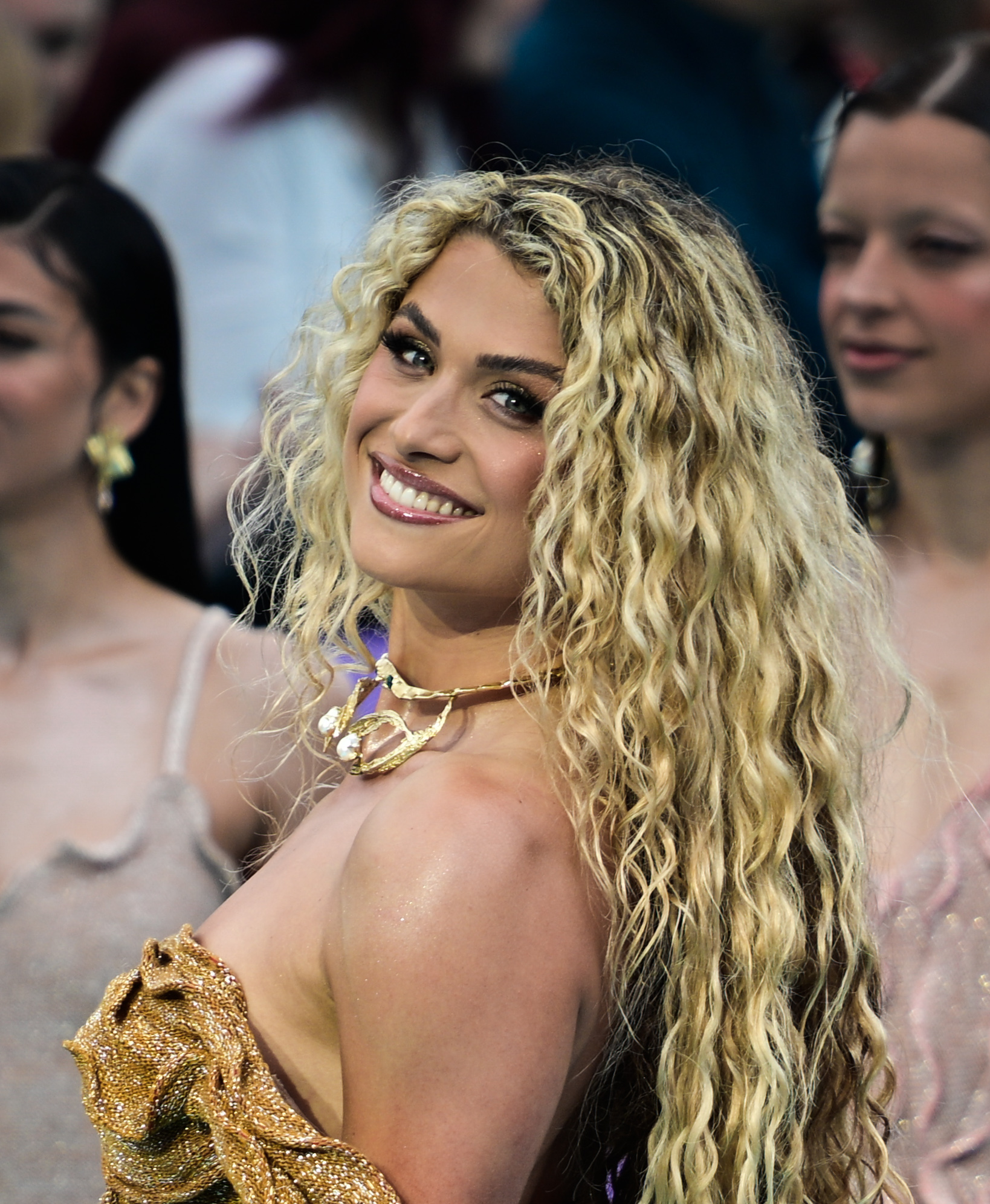
Antigoni Buxton, Series 8

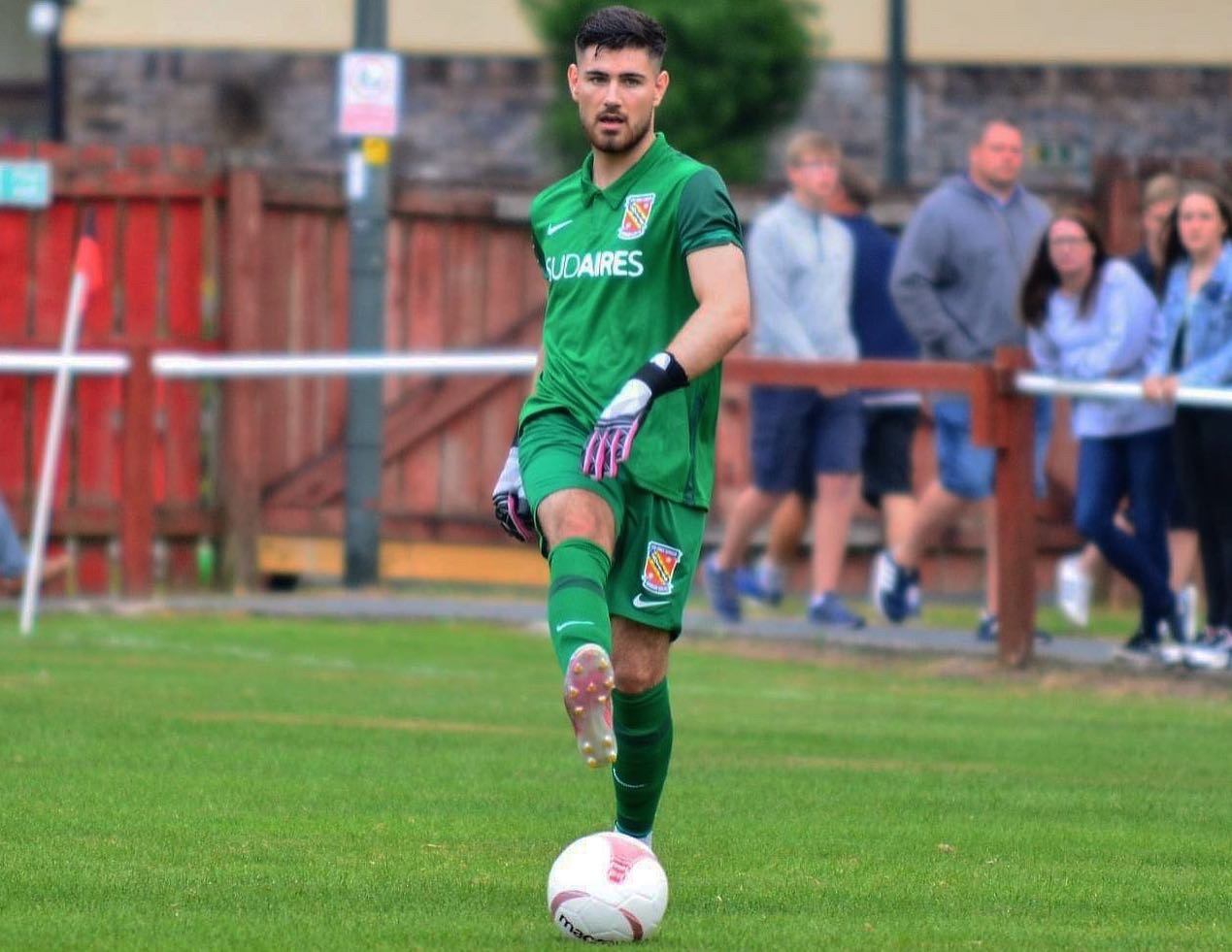
Scott van-der-Sluis, Series 10

Name	Age	Hometown	Occupation	Series	Status	Ref.
Finn Tapp	20	Milton Keynes	Recruitment consultant	6	Winner	
Paige Turley	22	West Lothian	Singer	6	Winner	
Luke Trotman	22	Luton	Semi-pro footballer	6	Runner-up	
Siânnise Fudge	25	Bristol	Beauty consultant	6	Runner-up	
Demi Jones	21	Portsmouth	Style advisor	6	Third place	
Luke Mabbott	24	Redcar	Heating engineer	6	Third place	
Ched Uzor	23	Suffolk	Scaffolder	6	Fourth place	
Jess Gale	20	London	VIP hostess	6	Fourth place	
Mike Boateng	24	London	Police officer	6	Dumped	
Priscilla Anyabu	25	Battersea	Operations manager	6	Dumped	
Callum Jones	23	Manchester	Scaffolder	6	Dumped	
Molly Smith	25	Manchester	Model	6	Dumped	
Jamie Clayton	28	Edinburgh	Recruitment consultant	6	Dumped	
Natalia Zoppa	20	Manchester	Student	6	Dumped	
Shaughna Phillips	25	London	Democratic services officer	6	Dumped	
Eva Zapico	21	Bromley	Recruitment consultant	6	Dumped	
Nas Majeed	23	London	Builder	6	Dumped	
Jordan Waobikeze	24	London	Administrator	6	Dumped	
Rebecca Gormley	21	Newcastle	Model and carer	6	Dumped	
Alexi Eraclides	23	Essex	Professional butler	6	Dumped	
Biggs Chris	27	Glasgow	Car-body repair specialist	6	Dumped	
George Day	27	Southampton	Estate agent	6	Dumped	
Jade Affleck	25	Yarm	Sales professional	6	Dumped	
Jamie McCann	24	North Ayrshire	Eyelash technician	6	Dumped	
Josh Kempton	21	Surrey	Model	6	Dumped	
Sophie Piper	21	Essex	Medical PA	6	Dumped	
Wallace Wilson	24	Inverness	Personal trainer	6	Dumped	
Leanne Amaning	22	London	Customer service advisor	6	Dumped	
Connor Durman	25	Brighton	Salesman	6	Dumped	
Connagh Howard	27	Cardiff	Model	6	Dumped	
Eve Gale	20	London	Student and VIP hostess	6	Dumped	
Ollie Williams	23	Cornwall	Estate owner	6	Walked	
Liam Reardon	21	Merthyr	Bricklayer	7	Winner	
Millie Court	24	Romford	Fashion buyer's admin	7	Winner	
Chloe Burrows	25	Bicester	Marketing executive	7	Runner-up	
Toby Aromolaran	22	Essex	Footballer	7	Runner-up	
Faye Winter	26	Devon	Estate agent	7	Third place	
Teddy Soares	26	Manchester	Senior financial consultant	7	Third place	
Kaz Kamwi	26	Essex	Fashion blogger	7	Fourth place	
Tyler Cruickshank	26	Croydon	Estate agent	7	Fourth place	
Jake Cornish	24	Weston-super-Mare	Plumber	7	Walked	
Liberty Poole	21	Birmingham	Waitress	7	Walked	
Aaron Simpson	24	Canterbury	Footballer	7	Dumped	
Mary Bedford	22	Leeds	Model	7	Dumped	
Brett Staniland	27	Derbyshire	Student and model	7	Dumped	
Priya Gopaldas	23	London	Student	7	Dumped	
Matthew MacNabb	26	Belfast	Strategic marketing executive	7	Dumped	
Abigail Rawlings	27	Bournemouth	Tattoo artist	7	Dumped	
Dale Mehmet	24	Glasgow	Barber	7	Dumped	
Amy Day	25	Surrey	Actress	7	Dumped	
Clarisse Juliette	23	London	Brand owner	7	Dumped	
Hugo Hammond	24	Hampshire	PE teacher	7	Dumped	
Sam Jackson	23	Clitheroe	Maintenance engineer	7	Dumped	
Harry Young	24	Wishaw	Car Salesman	7	Dumped	
Jack Barlow	26	Pett	Racing driver	7	Dumped	
Kaila Troy	28	Malahide	International DJ	7	Dumped	
Lillie Haynes	22	South Shields	Trainee accountant	7	Dumped	
Medhy Malanda	24	Luton	American football player	7	Dumped	
Salma Naran	20	Dublin	Influencer	7	Dumped	
Aaron Francis	24	London	VIP events host	7	Dumped	
Lucinda Strafford	21	Bristol	Online fashion boutique owner	7	Dumped	
Georgia Townend	28	Essex	Market executive	7	Dumped	
Andrea-Jane "AJ" Bunker	28	Hemel Hempstead	Hair extension technician	7	Dumped	
Danny Bibby	25	Wigan	Plumber	7	Dumped	
Sharon Gaffka	25	Didcot	Civil servant	7	Dumped	
Brad McClelland	26	Northumberland	Labourer	7	Dumped	
Rachel Finni	29	London	Luxury travel specialists	7	Dumped	
Oliver "Chuggs" Wallis	23	Surrey	Business owner	7	Dumped	
Shannon Singh	22	Fife	Model	7	Dumped	
Davide Sanclimenti	27	Manchester	Business owner	8	Winner	
Ekin-Su Cülcüloğlu	27	Essex	Actress	8	Winner	
Gemma Owen	19	Chester	International dressage rider and business owner	8	Runner-up	
Luca Bish	23	Brighton	Fishmonger	8	Runner-up	
Dami Hope	26	Dublin	Senior microbiologist	8	Third place	
Indiyah Polack	23	London	Hotel waitress	8	Third place	
Andrew Le Page	27	Guernsey	Real estate agent	8	Fourth place	
Tasha Ghouri	23	Thirsk	Model and dancer	8	Fourth place	
Adam Collard	26	Newcastle	Personal trainer	8	Dumped	
Paige Thorne	24	Swansea	Paramedic	8	Dumped	
Danica Taylor	21	Leicester	Dancer	8	Dumped	
Jamie Allen	27	Preston	Footballer	8	Dumped	
Deji Adeniyi	25	Bedford	Accounts manager	8	Dumped	
Lacey Edwards	25	Swindon	Professional dancer	8	Dumped	
Nathalia Campos	23	London	Operations manager and content creator	8	Dumped	
Reece Ford	23	Coventry	Model	8	Dumped	
Billy Brown	23	Surrey	Roofing company director	8	Dumped	
Summer Botwe	22	Hertfordshire	Events decor business co-owner	8	Dumped	
Coco Lodge	27	Surrey	Graphic designer, ring girl and shot girl	8	Dumped	
Josh Le Grove	22	Essex	Model	8	Dumped	
Jacques O'Neill	23	Walney	Rugby league footballer	8	Walked	
Chyna Mills	23	Leeds	Youth support worker	8	Dumped	
Jay Younger	28	Edinburgh	Investment analyst	8	Dumped	
Cheyanne Kerr	23	Barnsley	Cabin crew member	8	Dumped	
George Tasker	23	Cotswolds	Labourer	8	Dumped	
Jack Keating	23	Dublin	Social media marketer	8	Dumped	
Jazmine Nichol	21	Newcastle	Nightclub manager	8	Dumped	
Mollie Salmon	23	Southampton	Make-up artist	8	Dumped	
Samuel Agbiji	22	Manchester	Labourer	8	Dumped	
Antigoni Buxton	26	London	Singer-songwriter	8	Dumped	
Charlie Radnedge	28	London	Real estate developer	8	Dumped	
Amber Beckford	24	London	Nanny	8	Dumped	
Ikenna Ekwonna	23	Nottingham	Pharmaceutical salesman	8	Dumped	
Remi Lambert	22	Manchester	Model	8	Dumped	
Afia Tonkmor	25	London	Lounge host	8	Dumped	
Liam Llewellyn	22	Newport	Student	8	Walked	
Kai Fagan	24	Manchester	Science and P.E. teacher	9	Winner	
Sanam Harrinanan	24	Bedford	Social worker	9	Winner	
Lana Jenkins	25	Luton	Make-up artist	9	Runner-up	
Ron Hall	25	Essex	Financial advisor	9	Runner-up	
Samie Elishi	22	London	Senior estate agent coordinator	9	Third place	
Tom Clare	23	Barnsley	Semi-professional footballer	9	Third place	
Shaq Muhammad	24	London	Airport security officer	9	Fourth place	
Tanya Manhenga	22	Liverpool	Biomedical science student and influencer	9	Fourth place	
Jessie Wynter	26	Hobart	Personal trainer and influencer	9	Dumped	
Will Young	23	Aylesbury	Farmer	9	Dumped	
Casey O'Gorman	26	Tring	Recruitment consultant	9	Dumped	
Rosie Seabrook	24	Buckinghamshire	Industry placement advisor	9	Dumped	
Claudia Fogarty	28	Blackburn	Fashion boutique owner	9	Dumped	
Keanan Brand	24	Wigan	Professional rugby player	9	Dumped	
Maxwell Samuda	23	London	Finance student and restaurant host	9	Dumped	
Olivia Hawkins	27	Brighton	Ring girl and actress	9	Dumped	
Martin Akinola	27	Dublin	Senior software engineer	9	Dumped	
Bayley Mummery	25	Surrey	Operations manager	9	Dumped	
Cynthia Otseh-Taiwo	25	London	Dental receptionist and baker	9	Dumped	
Frankie Davey	22	Ipswich	Professional boxer	9	Dumped	
Kain Reed	21	Gateshead	Energy consultant	9	Dumped	
Layla Al-Momani	28	London	Brand managing director	9	Dumped	
Lydia Karakyriakou	22	Glasgow	Retail customer assistant	9	Dumped	
Lynda Flix	22	Salford	Healthcare assistant and singer	9	Dumped	
Ryan Weekley	22	Nottingham	Steel erector	9	Dumped	
Sammy James	27	Leicester	Beauty buyer	9	Dumped	
Ellie Spence	25	Norwich	Business development executive	9	Dumped	
Jordan Odofin	28	London	Senior HR advisor	9	Dumped	
Tanyel Revan	26	North London	Hair stylist	9	Dumped	
Aaron Waters	25	Melbourne	Model and content creator	9	Dumped	
Spencer Wilks	24	Bournemouth	E-commerce business owner	9	Dumped	
Zara Lackenby-Brown	25	London	Model and property developer	9	Dumped	
Anna-May Robey	20	Swansea	Payroll administrator	9	Dumped	
Haris Namani	21	Doncaster	Television salesman	9	Dumped	
David Salako	24	Little Oakley	Money adviser	9	Dumped	
Jess Harding	22	Uxbridge	Aesthetics practitioner	10	Winner	
Sammy Root	22	Kent	Project manager	10	Winner	
Lochan Nowacki	25	Bermondsey	Account manager	10	Runner-up	
Whitney Adebayo	25	Camden	Wig company owner	10	Runner-up	
Ella Thomas	23	Glasgow	Model	10	Third place	
Tyrique Hyde	24	Grays	Semi-professional footballer	10	Third place	
Molly Marsh	21	Doncaster	Musical theatre performer and social media creator	10	Fourth place	
Zachariah Noble	25	Lewisham	Personal trainer and basketball player	10	Fourth place	
Ella Barnes	23	Ashford	Championship dancer and model	10	Dumped	
Mitchel Taylor	26	Sheffield	Gas engineer	10	Dumped	
Abi Moores	25	Hampshire	Flight attendant	10	Dumped	
Scott van-der-Sluis	22	Connah's Quay	Footballer	10	Dumped	
Kady McDermott	27	Stevenage	Social media influencer	10	Dumped	
Ouzy See	28	Edinburgh	Footballer, model and tradesman	10	Dumped	
Amber Wise	19	Kensington	Graphic design student	10	Dumped	
Josh Brocklebank	26	Essex	Financial advisor	10	Dumped	
Leah Taylor	27	Manchester	Social media marketing business owner	10	Dumped	
Montel McKenzie	25	London	Account manager and semi-professional footballer	10	Dumped	
Catherine Agbaje	22	Tyrrelstown	Commercial real estate agent	10	Dumped	
Elom Ahlijah-Wilson	22	Enfield	Masseuse and fitness trainer	10	Dumped	
Benjamin Noel	26	London	Fitness business owner	10	Dumped	
Danielle Mazhindu	25	Liverpool	Recruitment assistant and occupational therapy student	10	Dumped	
Gabby Jeffery	24	Tyneside	Creative assistant	10	Dumped	
Kodie Murphy	20	Birmingham	Social media marketer	10	Dumped	
Tink Reading	26	Birmingham	Project manager	10	Dumped	
Zachary Ashford	27	Manchester	Senior sales executive	10	Dumped	
Mal Nicol	25	Edinburgh	Picture researcher	10	Dumped	
Mehdi Edno	26	Bordeaux	Communications manager	10	Dumped	
André Furtado	21	Dudley	Business owner	10	Dumped	
Charlotte Sumner	30	Bournemouth	Dental nurse	10	Dumped	
Ruchee Gurung	24	Sutton	Beautician	10	Dumped	
George Fensom	24	Bedford	Business development executive	10	Dumped	

== Series 11–present (2024–2026) ==
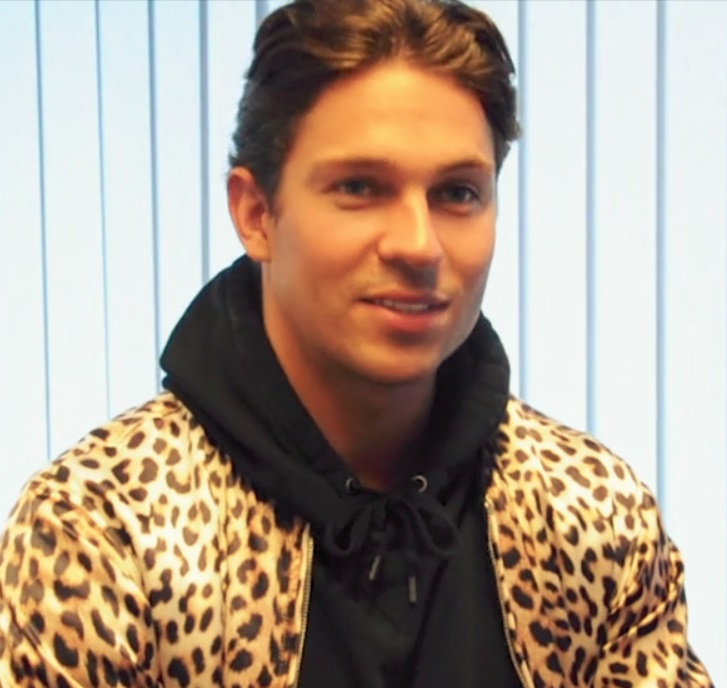
Joey Essex, Series 11

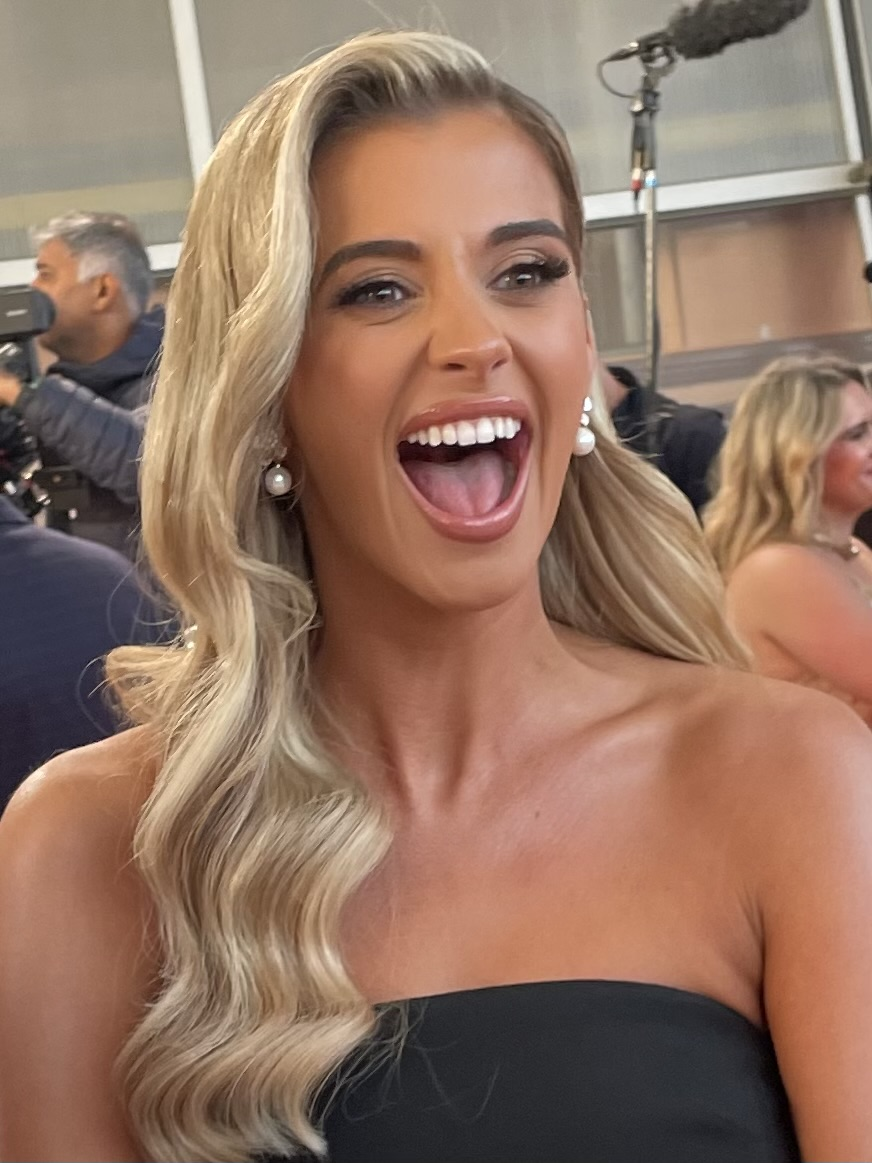
Jessy Potts, Series 11

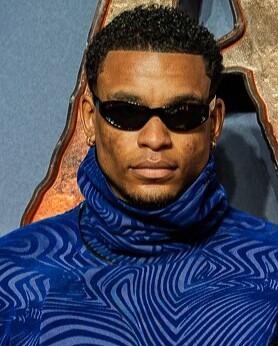
Cach Mercer, Series 12

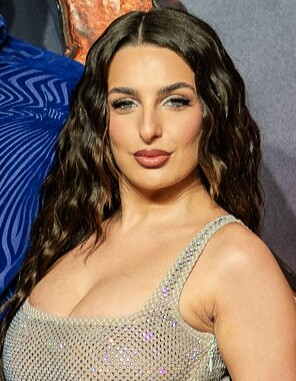
Toni Laites, Series 12

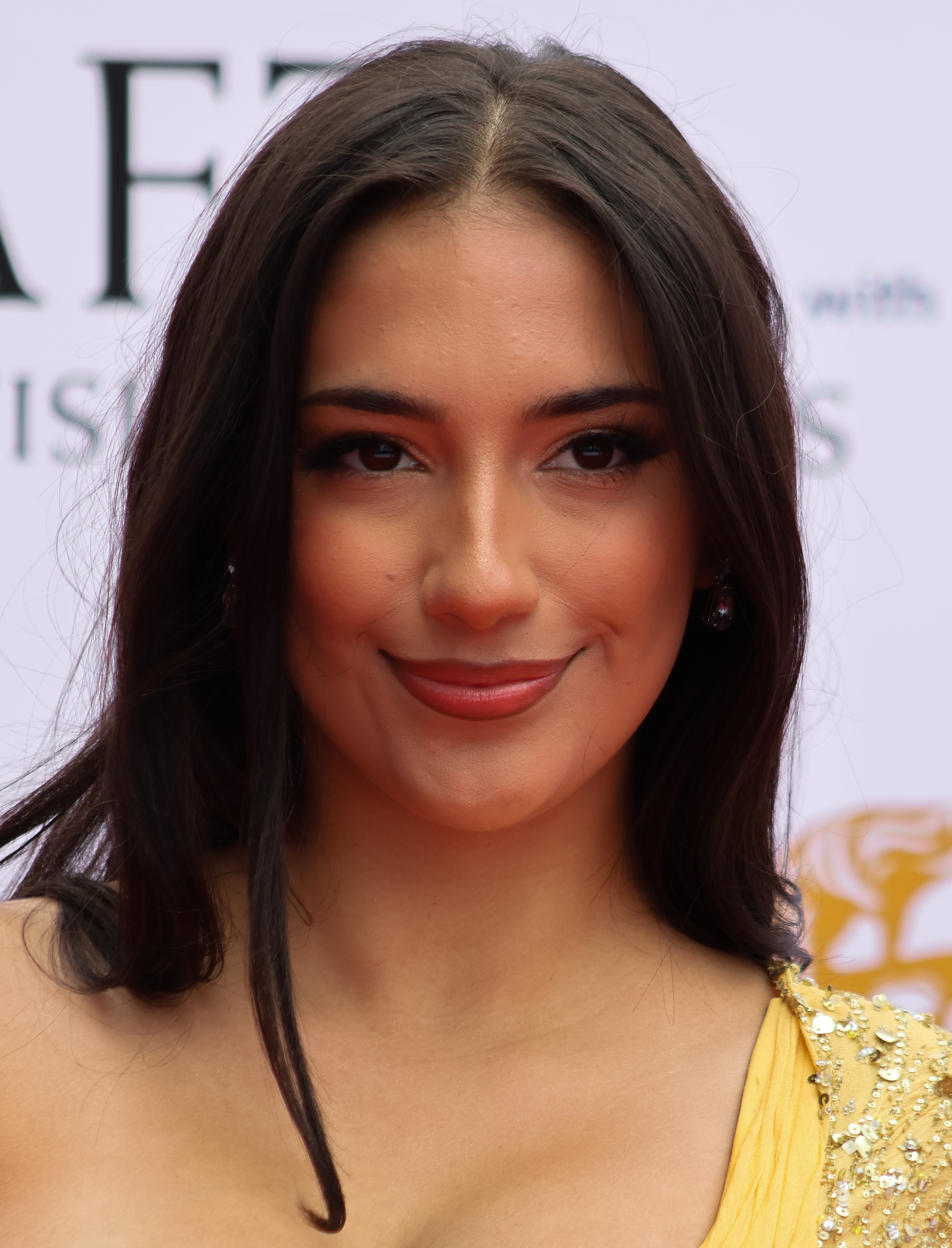
Shakira Khan, Series 12

Name	Age	Hometown	Occupation	Series	Status	Ref.
Mimii Ngulube	24	Portsmouth	Mental health nurse	11	Winner	
Josh Oyinsan	29	South London	Semi-professional footballer and model	11	Winner	
Ciaran Davies	21	Pencoed	Surveyor	11	Runner-up	
Nicole Samuel	24	Aberdare	Accounts manager	11	Runner-up	
Sean Stone	24	Hertford	Sweet salesman	11	Third place	
Matilda Draper	24	Beckenham	Recruitment consultant	11	Third place	
Ayo Odukoya	25	Canning Town	Model	11	Fourth place	
Jessica Spencer	25	London	Fashion stylist	11	Fourth place	
Joey Essex	33	Essex	Television personality	11	Dumped	
Jessy Potts	25	Leicester	Brand partner associate	11	Dumped	
Grace Jackson	25	Manchester	Model and business owner	11	Dumped	
Reuben Collins	23	Surrey	Account assistant	11	Dumped	
Harry Baker	25	Birmingham	Engineer	11	Dumped	
Lola Deluca	22	Surrey	Model	11	Dumped	
Konnor Ewudzi	28	Cornwall	Barber	11	Dumped	
Lolly Hart	30	Loughborough	Long haul cabin crew	11	Dumped	
Jess White	25	Stockport	Retail manager	11	Dumped	
Blade Siddiqi	29	Stevenage	Butler in the buff	11	Dumped	
Hugo Godfroy	24	Southampton	Electrician	11	Dumped	
Emma Milton	30	Manchester	Fashion content creator	11	Dumped	
Uma Jammeh	23	London	VIP host and model	11	Walked	
Wil Anderson	23	Whitley Bay	Quantity surveyor	11	Dumped	
Trey Norman	24	Doncaster	Commercial insurance broker	11	Dumped	
Ellie Jackson	22	Cardiff	Senior executive assistant	11	Dumped	
Jake Spivey	25	Rayleigh	Electrician	11	Dumped	
Joel Kirby	22	Devon	Post-graduate and content creator	11	Dumped	
Lionel Awudu	24	Reading	Financial advisor	11	Dumped	
Moziah Pinder	29	Brighton	Personal trainer	11	Dumped	
Diamanté Laiva	21	Beckenham	Natural beauty business owner	11	Dumped	
Lucy Graybill	26	Gourock	Retail store manager	11	Dumped	
Ruby Dale	23	Surrey	Social media content creator	11	Dumped	
Ronnie Vint	27	London	Semi- professional footballer	11	Dumped	
Harriett Blackmore	24	Brighton	Dancer and personal shopper	11	Dumped	
Omar Nyame	25	Croydon	P.E. teacher	11	Dumped	
Tiffany Leighton	25	Hertfordshire	HR co-ordinator	11	Dumped	
Samantha Kenny	26	Liverpool	Make-up artist	11	Dumped	
Patsy Field	29	Orpington	Office administrator	11	Dumped	
Munveer Jabbal	30	Surbiton	Recruitment manager	11	Dumped	
Sam Taylor	23	Chesterfield	Hair stylist	11	Dumped	
Antonia "Toni" Laites	24	Connecticut, U.S.	Las Vegas Pool Cabana server	12	Winner	
Cacherel "Cach" Mercer	24	East London	Professional dancer	12	Winner	
Harry Cooksley	30	Guildford	Gold trader, semi-professional footballer and model	12	Runner-up	
Shakira Khan	22	Burnley	Marketer	12	Runner-up	
Jamie Rhodes	26	Barking	Electrical engineer	12	Third place	
Yasmin Pettet	24	London	Commercial banking executive	12	Third place	
Angelique "Angel" Swift	26	Maidstone	Aesthetics practitioner	12	Fourth place	
Ty Isherwood	23	Barnsley	Site engineer	12	Fourth place	
Dejon Noel-Williams	26	Watford	Professional footballer and personal trainer	12	Dumped	
Megan "Meg" Moore	25	Southampton	Payroll specialist	12	Dumped	
Conor Phillips	25	Limerick	Professional rugby player	12	Dumped	
Megan Forte Clarke	24	Dublin	Musical theatre performer and energy broker	12	Dumped	
Blu Chegini	26	London	Construction project manager	12	Dumped	
Helena Ford	29	Devon	Cabin crew member	12	Dumped	
Bilikis "Billykiss" Azeez	28	Dublin	Content creator	12	Dumped	
Boris Vidović	28	Ljubljana, Slovenia	Model	12	Dumped	
Emma Munro	30	Norwich	Hydrogeologist	12	Dumped	
Harrison Solomon	22	Derby	U.S. college soccer player	12	Walked	
Lauren Wood	26	York	Dog walker	12	Dumped	
Lucy Quinn	21	Liverpool	Make-up artist	12	Dumped	
Tommy Bradley	22	Hertfordshire	Landscape gardener	12	Dumped	
Andrada Pop	27	Balbriggan	Personal trainer	12	Dumped	
Ben Holbrough	23	Gloucester	Private hire taxi driver	12	Dumped	
Chris Middleton	29	Manchester	Commercial real estate asset manager	12	Dumped	
Emily Moran	24	Aberdare	Insurance development executive	12	Dumped	
Giorgio Russo	30	Maidstone	Account manager	12	Dumped	
Martin Enitan	23	South London	Graduate	12	Dumped	
Rheo Parnell	26	Nuneaton	Ring girl	12	Dumped	
Yasmin "Yaz" Broom	26	Manchester	DJ & singer	12	Dumped	
Alima Gagio	23	Glasgow	Wealth management client services executive	12	Dumped	
Ryan Bannister	27	Chesterfield	Office retail support	12	Dumped	
Remell Mullings	24	Essex	Self improvement content creator	12	Dumped	
Caprice Alexandra	26	Romford	Nursery owner	12	Dumped	
Poppy Harrison	22	Stoke-on-Trent	Dental nurse	12	Dumped	
Shea Mannings	25	Bristol	Footballer	12	Dumped	
Will Means	25	Norfolk	Personal trainer	12	Dumped	
Malisha Jordan	24	Broxbourne	Teaching assistant	12	Dumped	
Sophie Lee	29	Darwen	Motivational speaker and author	12	Dumped	
Julia Majchrzak	26	London	Insurance broker	13	Winner	
Lorenzo Alessi	28	Hertfordshire	Business owner	13	Winner	
Jasmine Müller	27	Dubai (Note: Jasmine Müller is originally from Dubai but was residing in London at the time of casting and filming.)	Fashion business owner	13	Runner-up	
Kavan Murphy	21	Sevenoaks	Electrician	13	Runner-up	
Angelista Gunda	24	Staffordshire	Nurse	13	Third place	
Simbarashe "Simba" Kudyiwa	24	Enfield	Neurological rehabilitation assistant	13	Third place	
Tommy Stagg	23	Witham	Event owner and semi-professional footballer	13	Dumped	
Yasmin Hadlow	23	Broadstairs	Recruitment consultant	13	Dumped	
Mica Harris	21	Barbados (Note: Mica Harris is originally from Barbados but was residing in London at the time of casting and filming.)	Student	13	Dumped	
Samraj Toor	25	Birmingham	Model	13	Dumped	
Aidan Murphy	23	Kent	Property broker	13	Dumped	
Priya Jaswal	25	Surrey	Business development manager	13	Dumped	
Ethan Ellis	28	Nottingham	Fitness coach	13	Dumped	
Ellie Chadwick	24	West Lothian	Real estate videographer	13	Walked	
Finley Maddock	23	Bridgend	Builder	13	Dumped	
Martha Rothwell	25	London	Personal shopper	13	Dumped	
Elicia Bailey	23	Rotherham	Team organiser	13	Dumped	
Jordon Wilson	28	Surrey	Video editor	13	Dumped	
Lola Deal	28	Kent	Detective	13	Dumped	
Seán ''Fitzy'' Fitzgerald	25	Galway	Primary school teacher	13	Dumped	
Charleen Murphy	27	Dublin	Content creator	13	Dumped	
Marà Pirez	25	Luton	Nursery teacher	13	Dumped	
Aaron Badibo	26	East London	Basketball player	13	Dumped	
Carlos Borges	22	New Forest	Tarmac reinstatement	13	Dumped	
Nevaeh David	22	Gloucester	Student nurse	13	Dumped	
Olivia Sanderson	23	Doncaster	Marketing coordinator	13	Dumped	
Will Bessant	23	Barnsley	Model	13	Dumped	
Gabriel Garland	24	London	Model	13	Removed	
Tina Ghalei	25	Newcastle	Shot girl	13	Dumped	
Tommy Murphy	28	Newcastle	Builder	13	Dumped	
Chidi Ogandu	27	Milton Keynes	Civil engineer	13	Dumped	
Halle Brown	23	Altrincham	Dancer	13	Dumped	
Namibia Olpherts	25	Leeds	Customer service officer	13	Dumped	
Samuel "Sam" Workman	25	Dudley	Electrician	13	Dumped	
Ope Sowande	27	Lincolnshire	West End performer	13	Dumped	
Victoria Onanusi	25	Kildare	Personal assistant	13	Dumped	
Robyn Langton	21	Liverpool	Quantity surveyor and DJ	13	Dumped	
George Knight	28	Winchester	Semi-professional footballer	13	Removed	

== Post filming ==
Islanders	Series	Still Together?	Status	Ref
Jessica Hayes; Max Morley	1	No	Hayes and Morley split in August 2015.	
Hannah Elizabeth; Jon Clark	1	No	Elizabeth and Clark got engaged on the show, but split in October 2015.	
Cally Jane Beech; Luis Morrison	1	No	Beech and Morrison welcomed their first child in May 2017. They split in September 2018.	
Cara De La Hoyde; Nathan Massey	2	Yes	De La Hoyde and Massey got married in June 2019. They have two children.	
Alex Bowen; Olivia Buckland	2	Yes	Bowen and Buckland got married in September 2018. They have two children.	
Kady McDermott; Scott Thomas	2	No	McDermott and Thomas split in August 2017.	
Emma Jane Woodham; Terry Walsh	2	No	Woodham and Walsh split in February 2017.	
Rykard Jenkins; Rachel Fenton	2	No	Jenkins and Fenton split in December 2017.	
Amber Davies; Kem Cetinay	3	No	Davies and Cetinay split in December 2017.	
Camilla Thurlow; Jamie Jewitt	3	Yes	Thurlow and Jewitt got married in September 2021. They have three children.	
Chris Hughes; Olivia Attwood	3	No	Hughes and Attwood split in February 2018.	
Gabby Allen; Marcel Somerville	3	No	Allen and Somerville split in May 2018.	
Dom Lever; Jessica Shears	3	Yes	Lever and Shears got married in October 2018. They have two children.	
Dani Dyer; Jack Fincham	4	No	Dyer and Fincham split in April 2019.	
Laura Anderson; Paul Knops	4	No	Anderson and Knops split in September 2018.	
Josh Denzel; Kaz Crossley	4	No	Denzel and Crossley split in January 2019.	
Megan Barton-Hanson; Wes Nelson	4	No	Barton-Hanson and Nelson split in January 2019.	
Georgia Steel; Sam Bird	4	No	Steel and Bird split in October 2018.	
Charlie Brake; Ellie Brown	4	No	Brake and Brown split in October 2018.	
Samira Mighty; Frankie Foster	4	No	Mighty and Foster split in August 2018.	
Adam Collard; Zara McDermott	4	No	Collard and McDermott split in February 2019.	
Amber Gill; Greg O'Shea	5	No	Gill and O'Shea split in September 2019.	
Molly-Mae Hague; Tommy Fury	5	Yes	Hague and Fury got engaged on 23 July 2023, but broke up in August 2024. The couple got back together in May 2025. They have two children.	
India Reynolds; Ovie Soko	5	No	Reynolds and Soko split in October 2019.	
Curtis Pritchard; Maura Higgins	5	No	Pritchard and Higgins split in March 2020.	
Anton Danyluk; Belle Hassan	5	No	Danyluk and Hassan split in September 2019.	
Joe Garratt; Lucie Donlan	5	No	Garratt and Donlan split in December 2019.	
Danny Williams; Jourdan Riane	5	No	Williams and Riane split in October 2019.	
Chris Taylor; Maura Higgins	5	No	Taylor and Higgins began dating in November 2020. They split in May 2021.	
Finn Tapp; Paige Turley	6	No	Tapp and Turley split in June 2023.	
Luke Trotman; Siânnise Fudge	6	No	Trotman and Fudge split in November 2021.	
Demi Jones; Luke Mabbott	6	No	Jones and Mabbott split in May 2020.	
Ched Uzor; Jess Gale	6	No	Uzor and Gale split in June 2020.	
Mike Boateng; Priscilla Anyabu	6	No	Boateng and Anyabu split in June 2021.	
Callum Jones; Molly Smith	6	No	Jones and Smith split in September 2023.	
Eva Zapico; Nas Majeed	6	No	Zapico and Majeed split in March 2024.	
Rebecca Gormley; Biggs Chris	6	No	Gormley and Chris started dating after their season, but split in August 2021.	
Liam Reardon; Millie Court	7	No	Reardon and Court originally spilt in July 2022 before getting back together in April 2023. They split again in September 2025.	
Chloe Burrows; Toby Aromolaran	7	No	Burrows and Aromolaran split in October 2022.	
Faye Winter; Teddy Soares	7	No	Winter and Soares split in February 2023.	
Kaz Kamwi; Tyler Cruickshank	7	No	Kamwi and Cruickshank split in November 2022.	
Davide Sanclimenti; Ekin-Su Cülcüloğlu	8	No	Sanclimenti and Cülcüloğlu split in June 2023 before getting back together. They broke up again in January 2024.	
Gemma Owen; Luca Bish	8	No	Owen and Bish split in November 2022.	
Dami Hope; Indiyah Polack	8	No	Hope and Polack split in December 2025.	
Andrew Le Page; Tasha Ghouri	8	No	Le Page and Ghouri split in January 2025.	
Adam Collard; Paige Thorne	8	No	Collard and Thorne split in October 2022.	
Danica Taylor; Jamie Allen	8	No	Taylor and Allen split in August 2022.	
Kai Fagan; Sanam Harrinanan	9	Yes	Fagan and Harrinanan got married in August 2025.	
Lana Jenkins; Ron Hall	9	No	Jenkins and Hall split in July 2023.	
Samie Elishi; Tom Clare	9	No	Elishi and Clare split in April 2023.	
Shaq Muhammad; Tanya Manhenga	9	No	Muhammad and Manhenga split in August 2024.	
Jessie Wynter; Will Young	9	Yes	Wynter and Young got engaged in December 2025.	
Casey O'Gorman; Rosie Seabrook	9	No	O'Gorman and Seabrook split in March 2023.	
Maxwell Samuda; Olivia Hawkins	9	No	Samuda and Hawkins split in April 2023.	
Jess Harding; Sammy Root	10	No	Harding and Root split in October 2023.	
Lochan Nowacki; Whitney Adebayo	10	No	Nowacki and Adebayo split in April 2025.	
Ella Thomas; Tyrique Hyde	10	No	Thomas and Hyde originally split in November 2023 before getting back together. They broke up in February 2024.	
Molly Marsh; Zachariah Noble	10	No	Marsh and Noble originally split in March 2024 before getting back together a month later. They broke up again in July 2025.	
Ella Barnes; Mitchel Taylor	10	No	Barnes and Taylor Split in September 2023.	
Kady McDermott; Ouzy See	10	No	McDermott and See split in August 2023.	
Leah Taylor; Montel McKenzie	10	No	Taylor and McKenzie split in July 2023.	
Mimii Ngulube; Josh Oyinsan	11	No	Ngulube and Oyinsan split in August 2024.	
Ciaran Davies; Nicole Samuel	11	No	Davies and Samuel split in December 2024.	
Sean Stone; Matilda Draper	11	No	Stone and Draper split in August 2024.	
Ayo Odukoya; Jessica Spencer	11	No	Odukoya and Spencer split in October 2024.	
Joey Essex; Jessy Potts	11	No	Essex and Potts split in September 2024.	
Grace Jackson; Reuben Collins	11	No	Jackson and Collins split in August 2024.	
Jess White; Hugo Godfroy	11	No	White and Godfroy split in August 2024.	
Uma Jammeh; Wil Anderson	11	Yes	Jammeh and Anderson got engaged in July 2025.	
Harriett Blackmore; Ronnie Vint	11	No	Blackmore and Vint originally split in September 2024. They got back together on All Stars 2, before splitting again in June 2025.	
Cach Mercer; Toni Laites	12	No	Mercer and Laites split in March 2026.	
Harry Cooksley; Shakira Khan	12	Yes	Cooksley and Khan are still together as of November 2026.	
Jamie Rhodes; Yasmin Pettet	12	No	Rhodes and Pettet split in September 2025.	
Angel Swift; Ty Isherwood	12	Yes	Swift and Isherwood are still together as of November 2026.	
Dejon Noel-Williams; Meg Moore	12	Yes	Noel-Williams and Moore split in December 2025. They got back together in August 2026.	
Conor Phillips; Megan Forte Clarke	12	No	Phillips and Forte Clarke split in August 2026.	
Harrison Solomon; Lauren Wood	12	No	Solomon and Wood split in November 2025.	
Lucy Quinn; Tommy Bradley	12	No	Quinn and Bradley split in July 2025.	
Andrada Pop; Ben Holbrough	12	No	Pop and Holbrough split in July 2025.	
Julia Majchrzak; Lorenzo Alessi	13	No	Majchrzak and Alessi split in September 2026.	
Jasmine Müller; Kavan Murphy	13	Yes	Müller and Murphy are still together as of November 2026.	
Angelista Gunda; Simba Kudyiwa	13	Yes	Gunda and Kudyiwa are still together as of November 2026.	
Tommy Stagg; Yasmin Hadlow	13	No	Stagg and Hadlow split in September 2026.	
Mica Harris; Samraj Toor	13	Yes	Harris and Toor are still together as of November 2026.	
Aidan Murphy; Priya Jaswal	13	No	Murphy and Jaswal split in September 2026.	
Ellie Chadwick; Finley Maddock	13	Yes	Chadwick and Maddock are still together as of November 2026.	
Lola Deal; Seán Fitzgerald	13	Yes	Deal and Fitzgerald are still together as of November 2026.	
