= The Only Way Is Essex series 36 =

The Only Way Is Essex
- Series 36
- No. of episodes: 10

Release
- Original network: ITV2
- Original release: 26 April – 25 May 2026

Series chronology
- ← Previous; Series 35 Next → Series 37

The thirty-sixth series of the British reality television programme The Only Way Is Essex began airing on ITV2 on 26 April 2026 and concluded on 25 May 2026. Filming began in January 2026, with several of the episodes being filmed in Vietnam.

Prior to the beginning of the series, it was announced that Roman Hackett, Sammy Root and Matilda Draper would all be departing the show after appearing in nine, three and two series, respectively. It was also confirmed that Chloe Meadows would not appear in this series after announcing she would be taking a break from the show. In February 2026, it was announced that Freddie Bentley would be leaving the programme after five series, having flown home early whilst the cast were filming in Vietnam. Three new male cast members joined during the series: Josh Francis and identical twins Joe and Jonnie Gurie.

== Cast ==
- Amber Turner
- Amy Childs
- Becks Bloomberg
- Bill Delbosq
- Courtney Green
- Dan Edgar
- Dani Imbert
- Ella Rae Wise
- Elma Pazar
- Freddie Bentley
- Josh Francis
- Joe Gurie
- Jonnie Gurie
- Harry Derbidge
- James "Diags" Bennewith
- Jodie Wells
- Joe Blackman
- Jordan Brook
- Junaid Ahmed
- Lauren Goodger
- Livvy Jay
- Saffron Lempriere
- Sophie Kasaei

== Episodes ==
No. overall	No. in series	Title	Original release date	Duration
434	1	"Episode 1"	26 April 2026	60 minutes
435	2	"Episode 2"	27 April 2026	60 minutes
436	3	"Episode 3"	3 May 2026	60 minutes
437	4	"Episode 4"	4 May 2026	60 minutes
438	5	"Episode 5"	10 May 2026	60 minutes
439	6	"Episode 6"	11 May 2026	60 minutes
440	7	"Episode 7"	17 May 2026	60 minutes
441	8	"Episode 8"	18 May 2026	60 minutes
442	9	"Episode 9"	24 May 2026	60 minutes
443	10	"Episode 10"	25 May 2026	60 minutes
