= The Only Way Is Essex series 34 =

The Only Way Is Essex
- Series 34
- No. of episodes: 11

Release
- Original network: ITVBe
- Original release: 23 February – 4 May 2025

Series chronology
- ← Previous; Series 33 Next → Series 35

The 34th series of the British reality television programme The Only Way Is Essex began airing on 23 February 2025 on ITVBe and concluded on 4 May 2025. Filming began in January 2025, with several of the episodes being filmed in Bali. All cast members from the previous series returned. Love Island finalist Matilda Draper joined the cast for the series. Elma Pazar and Sammy Root appeared in fewer episodes due to their appearance on the second series of Love Island: All Stars. This was the last series to feature on ITVBe before returning to ITV2 later that year.

== Cast ==
- Amber Turner
- Amy Childs
- Becks Bloomberg
- Bill Delbosq
- Chloe Meadows
- Courtney Green
- Dan Edgar
- Dani Imbert
- Ella Wise
- Elma Pazar
- Freddie Bentley
- Harry Derbidge
- James "Diags" Bennewith
- Jodie Wells
- Joe Blackman
- Jordan Brook
- Junaid Ahmed
- Lauren Goodger
- Livvy Jay
- Matilda Draper
- Roman Hackett
- Saffron Lempriere
- Sammy Root
- Sophie Kasaei

== Episodes ==
No. overall	No. in series	Title	Original release date	Duration
408	1	"Episode 1"	23 February 2025	60 minutes
409	2	"Episode 2"	2 March 2025	60 minutes
410	3	"Episode 3"	9 March 2025	60 minutes
411	4	"Episode 4"	16 March 2025	60 minutes
412	5	"Episode 5"	23 March 2025	60 minutes
413	6	"Episode 6"	30 March 2025	60 minutes
414	7	"Episode 7"	6 April 2025	60 minutes
415	8	"Episode 8"	13 April 2025	60 minutes
416	9	"Episode 9"	20 April 2025	60 minutes
417	10	"Episode 10"	27 April 2025	60 minutes
418	11	"Episode 11"	4 May 2025	60 minutes
