= The Only Way Is Essex series 35 =

The Only Way Is Essex
- Series 35
- No. of episodes: 12

Release
- Original network: ITV2
- Original release: 17 August – 22 September 2025

Series chronology
- ← Previous; Series 34 Next → Series 36

The thirty-fifth series of the British reality television programme The Only Way Is Essex began airing on 17 August 2025 and concluded on 22 September 2025. In April 2025, it was announced that the programme would move back to its original channel ITV2, following the closure of ITVBe in June 2025. It is the first series to air on ITV2 since the twelfth series in 2014. Filming began in June 2025, with several of the episodes being filmed in Portugal. In a schedule change for this series, the programme aired on Sunday and Monday.

== Cast ==
- Amber Turner
- Amy Childs
- Becks Bloomberg
- Bill Delbosq
- Chloe Meadows
- Courtney Green
- Dan Edgar
- Dani Imbert
- Ella Rae Wise
- Elma Pazar
- Freddie Bentley
- Harry Derbidge
- James "Diags" Bennewith
- Jodie Wells
- Joe Blackman
- Jordan Brook
- Junaid Ahmed
- Lauren Goodger
- Livvy Jay
- Matilda Draper
- Roman Hackett
- Saffron Lempriere
- Sammy Root
- Sophie Kasaei

== Episodes ==
No. overall	No. in series	Title	Original release date	Duration
419	1	"Episode 1"	17 August 2025	60 minutes
420	2	"Episode 2"	18 August 2025	60 minutes
421	3	"Episode 3"	24 August 2025	60 minutes
422	4	"Episode 4"	25 August 2025	60 minutes
423	5	"Episode 5"	31 August 2025	60 minutes
424	6	"Episode 6"	1 September 2025	60 minutes
425	7	"Episode 7"	7 September 2025	60 minutes
426	8	"Episode 8"	8 September 2025	60 minutes
427	9	"Episode 9"	14 September 2025	60 minutes
428	10	"Episode 10"	15 September 2025	60 minutes
429	11	"Episode 11"	21 September 2025	60 minutes
430	12	"Episode 12"	22 September 2025	60 minutes
