= Tricked (British TV series) =

- Starring: Ben Hanlin
- Country of origin: United Kingdom
- Original language: English
- No. of series: 3
- No. of episodes: 22

Production
- Production location: United Kingdom
- Running time: 60 minutes (inc. adverts)
- Production company: ITV Studios

Original release
- Network: ITV2
- Release: 10 October 2013 – 27 October 2016

Tricked is a British television show presented by magician Ben Hanlin and first broadcast on ITV2 on 10 October 2013. The show features him pranking various celebrity guests with illusions.

In March 2014, it was confirmed that a second series of Tricked had been commissioned which began on 23 September 2014. In 2014, ITV confirmed that a third series of Tricked had been commissioned. The series began on 6 October 2015.

On 20 February 2019, Hanlin confirmed on an Instagram live story that the series will not return.

A Canadian adaptation hosted by Eric Leclerc, also titled Tricked, was created by Force Four Entertainment for YTV in 2016.

== Episodes ==
Series	Episodes	Start date	End date
1	7	10 October 2013	21 November 2013
2	7	23 September 2014	3 November 2014
3	7	6 October 2015	24 November 2015
Special		27 October 2016	

=== Series 1 (2013) ===
Show	Original air date	Guests
1	10 October 2013	Michelle Heaton, Rylan Clark, Christine Bleakley and Blue
2	17 October 2013	Joe Swash, Kate Garraway and Stacey Solomon
3	24 October 2013	Joe Calzaghe, Natasha Hamilton, Brian McFadden and Vogue Williams
4	31 October 2013^{A}	Jody Latham, Oritsé Williams and Helen Flanagan
5	7 November 2013	Robbie Savage and Amy Childs
6	14 November 2013	Luke Campbell and TOWIE's Arg and Diags
7	21 November 2013	Compilation episode – best of series 1

^{A}This episode was a Halloween edition of the show

=== Series 2 (2014) ===
Show	Original air date	Guests
1 (8)	23 September 2014	Charlotte Crosby, Lethal Bizzle, Brooke Vincent, Amy Kelly and Joey Essex
2 (9)	30 September 2014	The Vamps, Sam Bailey, Jorgie Porter and Louie Spence
3 (10)	7 October 2014	Kerry Katona and Kym Marsh
4 (11)	14 October 2014	Amy Willerton and David Haye
5 (12)	21 October 2014	Tinchy Stryder, Natalie Anderson and Matthew Wolfenden
6 (13)	28 October 2014	Dan Osborne, Ella Eyre, Peter Andre and Perry Fenwick
7 (14)	3 November 2014	Compilation episode – More Favourite Tricks

=== Series 3 (2015) ===
Show	Original air date	Guests
1 (15)	6 October 2015	
2 (16)	13 October 2015	Bobby-Cole Norris
3 (17)	20 October 2015	
4 (18)	27 October 2015	Gemma Collins
5 (19)	3 November 2015	
6 (20)	10 November 2015	
7 (21)	24 November 2015	Compilation episode – Tricked Top 30

=== Halloween Special (2016) ===
Show	Original air date	Guests
House of Horrors	27 October 2016	Jamie Laing, Marnie Simpson, Danni Armstrong, Scott Thomas, Kady McDermott, Megan McKenna, Lee Ryan, Simon Webbe
