= The Only Way Is Essex series 37 =

The Only Way Is Essex
- Series 37
- No. of episodes: 12

Release
- Original network: ITV2
- Original release: 2 August – 7 September 2026

Series chronology
- ← Previous; Series 36

The thirty-seventh series of the British reality television programme The Only Way Is Essex began airing on ITV2 on 2 August 2026 and concluded on 7 September 2026. Filming began in May 2026, following the conclusion of the previous series, with several of the episodes being filmed in Albania. All of the cast from previous series returned, including Freddie Bentley who departed during the series. The series was accompanied by the podcast You Alright, Hun?, with Billie Shepherd taking over from Denise van Outen as host. Prior to the beginning of the series, it was rumoured that former Little Mix member Jesy Nelson would be joining the cast. However, she subsequently denied the reports.

== Cast ==
- Amber Turner
- Amy Childs
- Becks Bloomberg
- Bill Delbosq
- Courtney Green
- Dan Edgar
- Dani Imbert
- Ella Rae Wise
- Elma Pazar
- Freddie Bentley
- Josh Francis
- Joe Gurie
- Jonnie Gurie
- Harry Derbidge
- James "Diags" Bennewith
- Jodie Wells
- Joe Blackman
- Jordan Brook
- Junaid Ahmed
- Lauren Goodger
- Livvy Jay
- Saffron Lempriere
- Sophie Kasaei

== Episodes ==
No. overall	No. in series	Title	Original release date	Duration
444	1	"Episode 1"	2 August 2026	60 minutes
445	2	"Episode 2"	3 August 2026	60 minutes
446	3	"Episode 3"	9 August 2026	60 minutes
447	4	"Episode 4"	10 August 2026	60 minutes
448	5	"Episode 5"	16 August 2026	60 minutes
449	6	"Episode 6"	17 August 2026	60 minutes
450	7	"Episode 7"	23 August 2026	60 minutes
451	8	"Episode 8"	24 August 2026	60 minutes
452	9	"Episode 9"	30 August 2026	60 minutes
453	10	"Episode 10"	31 August 2026	60 minutes
454	11	"Episode 11"	6 September 2026	60 minutes
455	12	"Episode 12"	7 September 2026	60 minutes
