= The Only Way Is Essex series 31 =

The Only Way Is Essex
- Series 31
- No. of episodes: 11

Release
- Original network: ITVBe
- Original release: 3 September – 12 November 2023

Series chronology
- ← Previous; Series 30 Next → Series 32

The thirty-first series of the British reality television programme The Only Way Is Essex began airing on 3 September 2023 on ITVBe.

Filming for the series began in August 2023. The series saw the introduction of Amy Childs' twins after she gave birth in April 2023. It was reported that Chloe Brockett had been suspended from the series after throwing numerous glasses at co-star Roman Hackett. It was also reported that Tommy Mallet would return to make an appearance in the series after he was spotted filming. Bianca Gascoigne also appeared in the series, as well as new cast members Joe Blackman and Jodie Wells making their respective debuts.

== Cast ==
- Amber Turner
- Amy Childs
- Bianca Gascoigne
- Billy Delbosq
- Chloe Brockett
- Chloe Meadows
- Courtney Green
- Dan Edgar
- Dani Imbert
- Ella Wise
- Elma Pazar
- Harry Derbidge
- James "Diags" Bennewith
- James "Lockie" Lock
- Jordan Brook
- Junaid Ahmed
- Polly Childs-Wright
- Roman Hackett
- Saffron Lempriere
- Sophie Kasaei
- Tommy Mallet

== Episodes ==
No. overall	No. in series	Title	Original release date	Duration
375	1	"Episode 1"	3 September 2023	60 minutes
376	2	"Episode 2"	10 September 2023	60 minutes
377	3	"Episode 3"	17 September 2023	60 minutes
378	4	"Episode 4"	24 September 2023	60 minutes
379	5	"Episode 5"	1 October 2023	60 minutes
380	6	"Episode 6"	8 October 2023	60 minutes
381	7	"Episode 7"	15 October 2023	60 minutes
382	8	"Episode 8"	22 October 2023	60 minutes
383	9	"Episode 9"	29 October 2023	60 minutes
384	10	"Episode 10"	5 November 2023	60 minutes
385	11	"Episode 11"	12 November 2023	60 minutes
