= Wes Barker =

Canadian magician and YouTuber (born 1986)

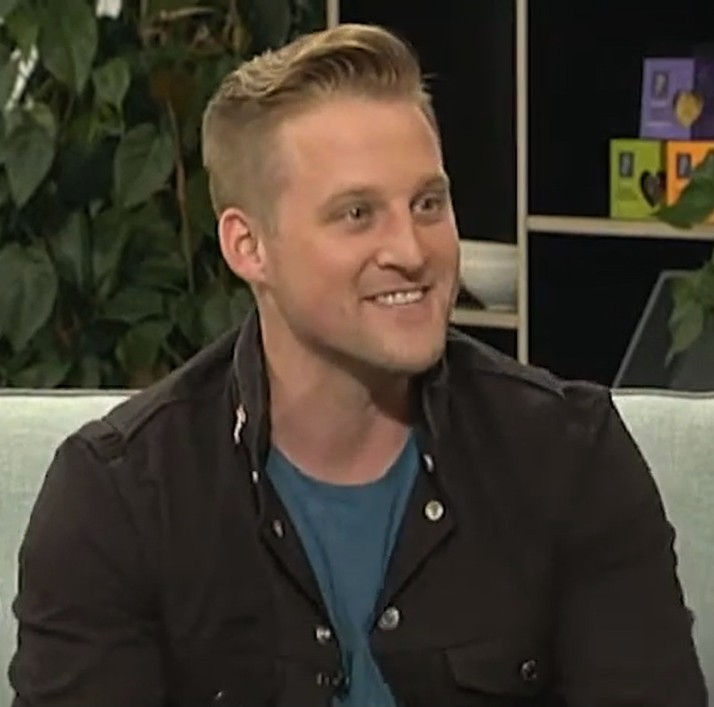
- Barker in 2016
- Born: April 16, 1986 (age 40); Langley, British Columbia, Canada
- Occupation: Comic Stunt Magician
- Spouse: Kristen Gillett

YouTube information
- Channel: WES Barker
- Years active: 2009–present
- Genre: Magic
- Subscribers: 277 thousand
- Views: 163 million
- Last updated: 21 February 2026
- Website: wesbarker.ca

Wesley Barker (born April 16, 1986) is a Canadian magician and YouTuber, known for starring in the TruTV stunt magic show Big Trick Energy. He has appeared on Ellen and America's Got Talent as well as Penn & Teller: Fool Us. His YouTube and Facebook channels have received hundreds of millions of views. He is also the co-host of the Bottom of the Barrel Podcast with Chris Ramsay.

== Career ==
Barker has competed in both the Canadian and American versions of Got Talent. He appeared on the second season of Fool Us in 2015, and managed to fool Penn and Teller with a trick involving a phonebook and a sword. He has received awards such as "Variety Performer of the Year", and "Comedian of the Year" from the Canadian Organization for Campus Activities (COCA).

== Personal life ==
Barker was born in Langley, British Columbia. He is a friend and neighbour of fellow YouTube magician Chris Ramsay, and they have collaborated on YouTube and as part of Big Trick Energy.

== Appearances ==
Barker has appeared, alongside friends and Big Trick Energy co-stars Alex Boyer, Eric Leclerc and Chris Ramsay, on WNCN in Raleigh, North Carolina, to discuss the show and their friendship. A video of a comedic skit he did, starring alongside his wife Kristen Gillett, was featured in an online article for Travel + Leisure; the article goes over a funny day in the life of a flight attendant working from home (Kristen Gillett is mentioned as a flight attendant for WestJet).
