= Jess Harding =

English television personality and influencer (born 2000)

- Born: Jessica Sydney Harding; 12 September 2000 (age 25); Slough, England
- Occupation: Television personality
- Years active: 2023–present
- Known for: Love Island; Love Island: All Stars

Jessica Sydney Harding (born 12 September 2000) is an English television personality and social media influencer, known for winning the tenth series of Love Island in 2023 and appearing as a contestant on the third series of Love Island: All Stars in 2026.

== Life and career ==
Jessica Sydney Harding was born on 12 September 2000 in Slough, Buckinghamshire. Prior to appearing on television, she worked as an aesthetics practitioner and owns her own company Candy Aesthetics.

In June 2023, she became a contestant on the tenth series of the ITV2 reality dating show Love Island. She was initially coupled up with George Fensom, before coupling up with Sammy Root. Harding was then coupled up with Mitchel Taylor, before reuniting with Root and the pair ultimately won the series with 34.57% of the final vote. The pair split the following month. In January 2026, it was announced that Harding would return to Love Island to appear as a contestant on the third series of Love Island: All Stars, three years after her original appearance. She entered the villa as an original contestant on Day 1.

== Filmography ==
As himself
Year	Title	Notes	Ref.
2023	Love Island	Winner; series 10	
2026	Love Island: All Stars	Contestant; series 3	
