= Love Island series 2 =

Love Island series 2 may refer to:

- Love Island (2005 TV series) series 2
- Love Island (2015 TV series) series 2
