= Catherine Agbaje =

Irish television personality (born 2000)

- Born: Catherine Funmilayo Agbaje; 23 June 2000 (age 26); Tyrrelstown, County Dublin, Ireland
- Education: Maynooth University (BA); University of Greenwich (MSc)
- Occupation: Television personality
- Years active: 2023–present
- Known for: Love Island; Love Island: All Stars

Catherine Funmilayo Agbaje (born 23 June 2000) is an Irish television personality, known for appearing as a contestant on the tenth series of the ITV2 dating show Love Island in 2023 and appearing on the second series of Love Island: All Stars in 2025.

== Life and career ==
Catherine Funmilayo Agbaje was born on 23 June 2000 in Tyrrelstown, County Dublin to parents of Nigerian descent. She obtained a BA in psychology and sociology from Maynooth University, before going on to get an MSc in real estate from the University of Greenwich. Prior to appearing on television, she worked as a commercial real estate agent.

In June 2023, she entered the Love Island villa to appear as one of the original contestants on the tenth series of the show. She was initially coupled up with André Furtado on the first day of the series, and subsequently featured in couples with Zachariah Noble and Scott van-der-Sluis, before deciding to couple up with Elom Ahlijah-Wilson during the show's "Casa Amor" twist. She was dumped from the island alongside the latter on Day 38 of the series, after the pair received the fewest votes to save from the public. In January 2025, it was announced that Agbaje would return to Love Island to appear as a contestant on the second series of Love Island: All Stars. She subsequently placed fourth place and left with Omary Nyame but their romance ended shortly after leaving the villa

== Filmography ==
As herself
Year	Title	Notes	Ref.
2023	Love Island	Contestant; series 10	
2025	Love Island: All Stars	Contestant; series 2	
