= Scott Thomas (TV personality) =

English television personality (born 1988)

- Born: Scott Alexander Thomas; 11 August 1988 (age 37); Salford, Greater Manchester, England
- Occupation: Television personality
- Years active: 2016–present
- Known for: Love Island (2016); Loose Women (2021); Love Island: All Stars (2025)
- Partner: Kady McDermott (2016–2017)
- Relatives: Ryan Thomas (brother); Adam Thomas (twin brother)

Scott Alexander Thomas (born 11 August 1988) is an English television personality, known for appearing on the second series of the ITV2 reality series Love Island (2016), and later returned to compete in the spin-off series Love Island: All Stars (2025).

== Early life ==
Scott Alexander Thomas was born on 11 August 1988 in Salford, Greater Manchester, England.

== Career ==
In June 2016, Thomas was announced as one of the contestants on the series 2 of Love Island. Throughout the series, Thomas coupled up with Zara Holland on the first day, before coupling up with Kady McDermott, whom he reached the final alongside and finished in third place. During the series, they entered a relationship and dated for a year before splitting up in August 2017.

Thomas has since gone on to make several appearances on the daytime show Lorraine, and has served as a competition presenter on Loose Women.

In 2018, he appeared in his brother Adam's episode of Big Star's Bigger Star.

In 2020, he starred alongside his brothers and father in the ITV documentary Absolutely India: Mancs in Mumbai, in which they visited India to trace their family roots.

In 2022, he appeared on a celebrity edition of the BBC Three programme Hot Property.

In 2023, he appeared on The Chris & Rosie Ramsey Show.

In January 2025, Thomas returned to Love Island nine years after his initial appearance to appear on the second series of the spin-off Love Island: All Stars.

== Personal life ==
Thomas is the younger brother of former Coronation Street actor Ryan Thomas, and younger non identical twin brother of Waterloo Road and former Emmerdale actor, Adam Thomas.

He is of English, Indian and Caribbean ancestry. His paternal grandfather is from Mumbai, India, and emigrated to Manchester, England, in 1947. His paternal great-grandmother was a West Indian who had Caribbean ancestry.

In June 2016 Thomas met Kady McDermott while being a contestant on Love Island series 2 while on the show they entered a relationship and dated for a year before splitting up in August 2017

In August 2020, Thomas admitted that he and his twin have a drinking problem; he got sober and celebrated six months of sobriety at the time.

== Filmography ==
Year	Title	Role	Notes	Ref.
2016	Love Island	Contestant	series 2	
2016	Lorraine	Guest	22 November 2016	
2018	Big Star's Bigger Star	Guest	1 episode	
2018	Lorraine	Guest	3 September 2018	
2019	Celebrity Coach Trip	Contestant	series 5	
2020	This Morning	Guest	1 episode	
2020	Lorraine	Guest	20 May 2020	
2020	Absolutely India: Mancs in Mumbai	Documentary series	Self	
2021	Loose Women	Guest	1 episode	
2021	Loose Women	Competition presenter	4 episodes	
2022	Hot Property: Celeb Edition	Guest	1 episode	
2023	The Chris & Rosie Ramsey Show	Guest	1 episode	
2025	Love Island: All Stars	Contestant	series 2	
