= Montel McKenzie =

English television personality and footballer (born 1997)

Personal information
- Full name: Montel Brian McKenzie
- Date of birth: 31 December 1997 (age 28)
- Place of birth: Waltham Forest, London, England
- Position: Right-back

Team information
- Current team: AFC Whyteleafe

Senior career*
Years	Team	Apps	(Gls)
2022–2023	Woodford Town		
2023–2024	Hemel Hempstead Town	51	(1)
2024–2025	Billericay Town	28	(1)
2025–2026	Folkestone Invicta	29	(2)
2026–	AFC Whyteleafe	2	(0)
- * Club domestic league appearances and goals as of 17:52, 30 June 2026 (UTC)

Montel Brian McKenzie (born 31 December 1997) is an English television personality and semi-professional footballer. He currently plays as a right-back for club AFC Whyteleafe.

He is known for appearing as a contestant on the tenth series of the ITV2 dating show Love Island in 2023, as well as the second series of Love Island: All Stars in 2025.

== Early life ==
Montel Brian McKenzie was born on 31 December 1997 in Waltham Forest, London. McKenzie previously worked as an account manager.

== Football career ==
McKenzie has played as right-back for Woodford Town and Hemel Hempstead Town respectively

In August 2024, McKenzie joined Isthmian League Premier Division side Billericay Town. In June 2025, McKenzie joined fellow Isthmian League Premier Division side Folkestone Invicta.

On 14 March 2026, It was announced that McKenzie would be the captain of YouTuber KSI's Baller League team, Prime FC.

In June 2026, he returned to the Isthmian League Premier Division following Folkestone's promotion the previous season, joining newly promoted AFC Whyteleafe.

In his second league appearance for Whyteleafe, McKenzie was sent off for dissent during a 3–0 loss to Burgess Hill Town.

== Television career ==
In June 2023, he entered the Love Island villa to appear as a contestant on the show's tenth series. He entered the villa as a "bombshell" on Day 16, alongside Mal Nicol. During his time in the villa, he coupled up with fellow contestant Leah Taylor, and the pair were subsequently dumped from the island on Day 38 of the series after receiving the fewest votes from the public. In January 2025, two years after his original appearance, it was announced that McKenzie would return to Love Island to appear as a contestant on the second series of Love Island: All Stars. He again entered the series as a "bombshell" on Day 11 of the series, alongside Harriett Blackmore.

== Honours ==
Folkestone Invicta

- Isthmian League Premier Division: 2025–26

== Personal life ==
In June 2026, McKenzie became engaged to Swiss footballer Alisha Lehmann.

== Filmography ==
As himself
Year	Title	Notes	Ref.
2023	Love Island	Contestant; series 10	
2023	Love Island: Aftersun	Guest	
2025	Love Island: All Stars	Contestant; series 2	
