= Big Trick Energy =

American comedy television series

- Genre: Hidden camera Magic; Comedy
- Created by: Chris Ramsay
- Starring: Chris Ramsey; Eric Leclerc; Alex Boyer; Wes Barker
- Country of origin: United States
- Original language: English
- No. of seasons: 1
- No. of episodes: 10

Production
- Running time: 24 minutes
- Production company: Diga Studios

Original release
- Network: TruTV
- Release: April 22 – June 24, 2021

Big Trick Energy is an American comedy television series starring Chris Ramsay, Eric Leclerc, Alex Boyer and Wes Barker. The series premiered on TruTV on April 22, 2021.

== Episodes ==
No.	Title	Original release date	US viewers (millions)
1	"A Car Is Torn"	April 22, 2021	0.413
2	"Roadtrip to Whiskey Castle"	April 29, 2021	0.181
3	"Mom and Pop-Up Magic Shop"	May 6, 2021	0.245
4	"Ramsay's Birthday Surprise"	May 13, 2021	0.145
5	"Wes-Defying Stunt"	May 20, 2021	0.147
6	"Magic Man's Best Friend"	May 27, 2021	0.155
7	"Introducing David Blane"	June 3, 2021	0.152
8	"Cold Turkey"	June 10, 2021	0.146
9	"Magic Mountain"	June 17, 2021	0.113
10	"Paintball Bullet Catch"	June 24, 2021	0.131
