= Leanne Amaning =

English television personality and influencer (born 1997)

- Born: 31 May 1997 (age 28); Waltham Forest, London, England
- Education: University of Nottingham (MSc)
- Occupation: Television personality
- Years active: 2020–present
- Known for: Love Island; Love Island: All Stars

Leanne Savannah Amaning (born 31 May 1997) is an English television personality and content creator, known for appearing as a contestant on the sixth series of Love Island in 2020 and the third series of Love Island: All Stars in 2026, where she finished in third place.

== Life and career ==
Leanne Savannah Amaning was born on 31 May 1997 in the London Borough of Waltham Forest, and is of Ghanaian descent. Prior to appearing on television, she worked as a customer service advisor, and graduated in 2019 with a Master of Science degree in Occupational Psychology with Distinction from the University of Nottingham. In January 2020, she became a contestant on the sixth series of the ITV2 reality dating show Love Island, entering the villa on Day 1 and departing on Day 18. In January 2026, it was announced that she would return to Love Island to appear as a contestant on the third series of Love Island: All Stars, six years after her original appearance. Amaning again entered the villa as an original contestant on Day 1, reaching the final alongside partner Scott van-der-Sluis and finishing in third place.

== Filmography ==
As herself
| Year | Title | Role | Notes | Ref. |
|---|---|---|---|---|
| 2020 | Love Island | Contestant | Series 6 | |
| 2026 | Love Island: All Stars | Contestant | Series 3; Third place | |
