= Love Island: All Stars series 3 =

2026 series of Love Island: All Stars

Love Island: All Stars
- Series 3
- Presented by: Maya Jama
- No. of days: 34
- No. of contestants: 26
- Winners: Ciaran Davies; Samie Elishi
- Runners-up: Millie Court; Zac Woodworth
- No. of episodes: 40

Release
- Original network: ITV2
- Original release: 15 January – 23 February 2026

Series chronology
- ← Previous; Series 2

The third series of Love Island: All Stars, a spin-off of the reality series Love Island, began broadcasting on ITV2 on 15 January 2026. It again featured former contestants from previous series. Maya Jama returned to present the series, with Iain Stirling returning as narrator. The series was originally scheduled to begin on 12 January 2026, however production was paused and broadcasting of the show was postponed for three days due to wildfires near the villa in South Africa. The series ended on 23 February 2026. It was won by Ciaran Davies and Samie Elishi, who were previously contestants on the eleventh and ninth series respectively.

In addition to ITV2, the show is available for streaming through the ITVX platform and internationally on 9Now (Australia), TVNZ+ (New Zealand), and Peacock (United States).

== Production ==
In August 2025, it was announced that Love Island: All Stars would return for a third series. It is set to begin in January 2026, with Maya Jama returning as presenter, whilst Iain Stirling will continue to narrate the series. It was also confirmed that the series would be extended by a week, making it the longest series of the spin-off to date. The first trailer began airing in December 2025, and depicted an evidence board with various Love Island related objects and teasers including the villa entrance, a ticket and a map, as well as the words "Who's got unfinished business". A further trailer featuring host Jama began airing the following month, with her teasing clues to the returning islanders on the same evidence board.

== Islanders ==
The original returning Islanders for the third All Stars series were announced on 5 January 2026. Numerous "bombshells" subsequently entered the villa over the course of the series, including six islanders who appeared on the American version of Love Island.

Islander	Age	Hometown	Original series	Entered	Exited	Status	Ref
Ciaran Davies	23	Pencoed	Series 11	Day 1	Day 34	Winner	
Samie Elishi	25	Camden	Series 9	Day 3	Day 34	Winner	
Millie Court	29	Romford	Series 7	Day 1	Day 34	Runner-up	
Zac Woodworth	26	Portland, U.S.	USA season 7	Day 14	Day 34	Runner-up	
Leanne Amaning	28	Waltham Forest	Series 6	Day 1	Day 34	Third place	
Scott van-der-Sluis	25	Connah's Quay	Series 10	Day 1	Day 34	Third place	
Lucinda Strafford	26	Ditchling	Series 7	Day 9	Day 34	Fourth place	
Sean Stone	26	Hertford	Series 11	Day 1	Day 34	Fourth place	
Whitney Adebayo	28	Camden	Series 10	Day 1	Day 34	Fifth place	
Yamen Sanders	31	Inglewood, U.S.	USA season 1	Day 14	Day 34	Fifth place	
Belle Hassan	27	Bromley	Series 5	Day 1	Day 32	Dumped	
Harrison Solomon	23	Derby	Series 12	Day 22	Day 32	Dumped	
Jessy Potts	26	Leicester	Series 11	Day 22	Day 31	Dumped	
Tommy Bradley	22	Potters Bar	Series 12	Day 1	Day 31	Dumped	
Carrington Rodriguez	28	Salt Lake City, U.S.	USA season 2	Day 14	Day 29	Dumped	
Helena Ford	29	Barnstaple	Series 12	Day 1	Day 29	Dumped	
Jack Keating	26	Dublin	Series 8	Day 1	Day 26	Dumped	
Sheribel "Sher" Suarez	27	Orlando, U.S.	USA season 2	Day 14	Day 26	Dumped	
Curtis Pritchard	29	Whitchurch	Series 5	Day 9	Day 20	Dumped	
Imani Ayan Wheeler	24	Sacramento, U.S.	USA season 5	Day 14	Day 20	Dumped	
Konnor Ewudzi	30	Cornwall	Series 11	Day 3	Day 20	Dumped	
Kyra Lizama	28	Honolulu, U.S.	USA season 3	Day 14	Day 20	Dumped	
Jess Harding	25	Ruislip	Series 10	Day 1	Day 13	Dumped	
Shaq Muhammad	27	London	Series 9	Day 1	Day 13	Dumped	
Andrea-Jane "AJ" Bunker	33	Dunstable	Series 7	Day 3	Day 7	Dumped	
Charlie Frederick	31	Plymouth	Series 4	Day 1	Day 7	Dumped	

=== Future appearances ===
In 2026, Curtis Pritchard competed on the fourth series of Celebrity Ex on the Beach. Yamen Sanders appeared on season four of Perfect Match. Sher also appears in the recent seasons of Vanderpump Villa.

== Coupling and elimination history ==
	Week 1					Week 2		Week 3		Week 4		Week 5				Final
	Day 1	Day 3		Day 6	Day 7	Day 10	Day 13	Day 18	Day 20	Day 25	Day 26	Day 29	Day 31	Day 32		Final
Ciaran	Millie	Single		Samie	Safe	Lucinda	Safe	Samie	Safe	Samie	Safe	Safe	Safe	Vulnerable	Finalist	Winner (Day 34)
Samie	Not in Villa			Ciaran	Safe	Shaq	Safe	Ciaran	Safe	Ciaran	Safe	Safe	Safe	Vulnerable	Finalist	Winner (Day 34)
Millie	Ciaran	Charlie	Konnor	Charlie	Charlie to dump	Curtis	Safe	Zac	Safe	Zac	Safe	Safe	Safe	Vulnerable	Finalist	Runner-up (Day 34)
Zac	Not in Villa							Millie	Safe	Millie	Safe	Safe	Safe	Vulnerable	Finalist	Runner-up (Day 34)
Leanne	Shaq	Scott		Scott	Safe	Scott	Vulnerable	Tommy	Safe	Scott	Safe	Safe	Safe	Vulnerable	Finalist	Third place (Day 34)
Scott	Not in Villa	Leanne		Leanne	AJ to dump	Leanne	Safe	Sher	Vulnerable	Leanne	Safe	Safe	Safe	Vulnerable	Finalist	Third place (Day 34)
Lucinda	Not in Villa					Ciaran	Vulnerable	Sean	Vulnerable	Sean	Safe	Safe	Safe	Vulnerable	Finalist	Fourth place (Day 34)
Sean	Belle	Belle		Helena	Vulnerable	Belle	Safe	Lucinda	Vulnerable	Lucinda	Safe	Safe	Safe	Vulnerable	Finalist	Fourth place (Day 34)
Whitney	Jack	Jack		Konnor	Vulnerable	Konnor	Safe	Yamen	Safe	Yamen	Safe	Safe	Safe	Vulnerable	Finalist	Fifth place (Day 34)
Yamen	Not in Villa							Whitney	Safe	Whitney	Safe	Safe	Safe	Vulnerable	Finalist	Fifth place (Day 34)
Belle	Sean	Sean		Jack	Safe	Sean	Safe	Jack	Safe	Harrison	Safe	Safe	Safe	Vulnerable	Eliminated	Dumped (Day 32)
Harrison	Not in Villa									Belle	Safe	Safe	Safe	Vulnerable	Eliminated	Dumped (Day 32)
Jessy	Not in Villa									Tommy	Safe	Safe	Eliminated	Lucinda & Sean to dump		Dumped (Day 31)
Tommy	Jess	Jess		Jess	Safe	Helena	Safe	Leanne	Safe	Jessy	Safe	Safe	Eliminated	Belle & Harrison to dump		Dumped (Day 31)
Carrington	Not in Villa							Helena	Safe	Helena	Safe	Eliminated	Dumped (Day 29)	Belle & Harrison to dump		Dumped (Day 29)
Helena	Charlie	Shaq		Sean	Safe	Tommy	Safe	Carrington	Safe	Carrington	Safe	Eliminated	Dumped (Day 29)	Leanne & Scott to dump		Dumped (Day 29)
Jack	Whitney	Whitney		Belle	Safe	Jess	Safe	Belle	Safe	Sher	Eliminated	Dumped (Day 26)		Lucinda & Sean to dump		Dumped (Day 26)
Sher	Not in Villa							Scott	Vulnerable	Jack	Eliminated	Dumped (Day 26)		Belle & Harrison to dump		Dumped (Day 26)
Curtis	Not in Villa					Millie	Vulnerable	Kyra	Eliminated	Dumped (Day 20)				Leanne & Scott to dump		Dumped (Day 20)
Kyra	Not in Villa							Curtis	Eliminated	Dumped (Day 20)				Belle & Harrison to dump		Dumped (Day 20)
Imani	Not in Villa							Konnor	Eliminated	Dumped (Day 20)				Belle & Harrison to dump		Dumped (Day 20)
Konnor	Not in Villa		Millie	Whitney	Vulnerable	Whitney	Vulnerable	Imani	Eliminated	Dumped (Day 20)				Leanne & Scott to dump		Dumped (Day 20)
Jess	Tommy	Tommy		Tommy	Vulnerable	Jack	Eliminated	Dumped (Day 13)						Belle & Harrison to dump		Dumped (Day 13)
Shaq	Leanne	Helena		AJ	Safe	Samie	Eliminated	Dumped (Day 13)						Lucinda & Sean to dump		Dumped (Day 13)
AJ	Not in Villa			Shaq	Vulnerable	Dumped (Day 7)								Belle & Harrison to dump		Dumped (Day 7)
Charlie	Helena	Millie	Single	Millie	Vulnerable	Dumped (Day 7)								Leanne & Scott to dump		Dumped (Day 7)
Notes	1	2		none	3	none	4	none	5	none	6	7	8	9		10
Dumped	No; Dumping				AJ; Scott's choice to dump	No; Dumping	Jess, Shaq; Public's choice to dump	No; Dumping	Curtis & Kyra; Imani & Konnor; Public's choice to dump	No; Dumping	Jack & Sher; Lost challenge	Carrington & Helena; Public's choice to dump	Jessy & Tommy; Public's choice to dump	Belle & Harrison; 7 of 14 votes to dump		Whitney & Yamen; 9.23% to win
Dumped	No; Dumping				AJ; Scott's choice to dump	No; Dumping	Jess, Shaq; Public's choice to dump	No; Dumping	Curtis & Kyra; Imani & Konnor; Public's choice to dump	No; Dumping	Jack & Sher; Lost challenge	Carrington & Helena; Public's choice to dump	Jessy & Tommy; Public's choice to dump	Belle & Harrison; 7 of 14 votes to dump		Lucinda & Sean; 12.77% to win
Dumped	No; Dumping				AJ; Scott's choice to dump	No; Dumping	Jess, Shaq; Public's choice to dump	No; Dumping	Curtis & Kyra; Imani & Konnor; Public's choice to dump	No; Dumping	Jack & Sher; Lost challenge	Carrington & Helena; Public's choice to dump	Jessy & Tommy; Public's choice to dump	Belle & Harrison; 7 of 14 votes to dump		Leanne & Scott; 19.41% to win
Dumped	No; Dumping				Charlie; Millie's choice to dump	No; Dumping	Jess, Shaq; Public's choice to dump	No; Dumping	Curtis & Kyra; Imani & Konnor; Public's choice to dump	No; Dumping	Jack & Sher; Lost challenge	Carrington & Helena; Public's choice to dump	Jessy & Tommy; Public's choice to dump	Belle & Harrison; 7 of 14 votes to dump		Millie & Zac; 23.38% to win
Dumped	No; Dumping				Charlie; Millie's choice to dump	No; Dumping	Jess, Shaq; Public's choice to dump	No; Dumping	Curtis & Kyra; Imani & Konnor; Public's choice to dump	No; Dumping	Jack & Sher; Lost challenge	Carrington & Helena; Public's choice to dump	Jessy & Tommy; Public's choice to dump	Belle & Harrison; 7 of 14 votes to dump		Samie & Ciaran; 35.22% to win

=== Notes ===
- ^Note 1: Ahead of the show's launch, voting opened for the public to decide the first couplings of the series.
- ^Note 2: On Day 3, immediately following the recoupling, new bombshell Konnor entered the villa. He had to steal a girl of his choice. He picked Millie, leaving Charlie and Ciaran single.
- ^Note 3: On Day 7, following a public vote for their favourite girl and their favourite boy, Millie and Scott received the most votes. The bottom three girls and bottom three boys were vulnerable and at risk of being dumped from the island. As the most popular islanders, Scott had to decide which girl to dump, whilst Millie had to decide which boy. They ultimately chose to dump AJ and Charlie from the villa respectively.
- ^Note 4: On Day 13, following a public vote for their favourite girl and their favourite boy, Samie and Sean received the most votes. The bottom three girls and bottom three boys were vulnerable and at risk of being dumped from the island. The islanders with the fewest votes, Jess and Shaq, were dumped from the island.
- ^Note 5: On Day 20, following a public vote for their favourite couple, the four bottom couples were vulnerable and at risk of being dumped from the island. The two couples with the fewest votes, Kyra and Curtis and Imani and Konnor, were dumped from the island.
- ^Note 6: On Day 26, following the challenge, as the couple coming in last place, Sher and Jack were immediately dumped from the villa.
- ^Note 7: On Day 29, following a public vote for their favourite couples, Lucinda and Sean received the most votes. The couple with the least public votes, Helena and Carrington, was then dumped from the villa.
- ^Note 8: On Day 31, after receiving the fewest public votes for most compatible couple, Jessy and Tommy were dumped from the island.
- ^Note 9: On Day 32, the dumped islanders returned to the villa to decide who is the least compatible. Belle and Harrison received the most votes and were ultimately dumped from island.
- ^Note 10: The public voted for which couple they think should win Love Island: All Stars. The couple with the most votes were declared the winners of Love Island: All Stars and received the grand prize money.

== Weekly summary ==
The main events in the Love Island villa are summarised in the table below.

Week 1	Entrances	On Day 1, Belle, Ciaran, Charlie, Helena, Jack, Jess, Leanne, Millie, Sean, Shaq, Tommy and Whitney entered the villa. Scott entered the villa as the first bombshell the same evening.; On Day 3, AJ, Konnor and Samie entered the villa.
Week 1	Coupling	On Day 1, following a public vote to decide the first couples of the series, Belle was paired with Sean, Whitney coupled up with Jack, Helena was chosen to be with Charlie, Jess was paired with Tommy, Leanne with Shaq, and Millie was picked to couple up with Ciaran.; On Day 3, the islanders recoupled for the first time. As the newest islander, Scott chose first and decided to couple up with Leanne. The girls then chose which boy they wanted to couple up with. Millie chose Charlie, whilst Helena coupled up with Shaq. Meanwhile, Whitney and Jack, Belle and Sean, and Jess and Tommy remained together. New islander Konnor subsequently entered and chose to steal Millie, leaving Charlie single, alongside Ciaran.; On Day 6, the islanders recoupled again. As new islanders, AJ and Samie chose first and decided to couple up with Shaq and Ciaran respectively. The boys then chose which girl they wanted to couple up with. Scott decided to remain with Leanne, Charlie chose Millie, Sean chose to couple up with Helena, Konnor opted for Whitney, and Jack chose Belle, leaving Tommy to remain with Jess.
Week 1	Challenges	On Day 1, the islanders took part in a game in which the girls had to award a sash with "Good" written on for to the boy they thought would be good for them, and a sash with "No Good" written on to the boy they thought would be no good for them. Upon bombshell Scott's entrance, he had to choose which two boys he thought were no good for their respective girls. He chose Sean and Shaq, who ultimately had to spend the night in the hideaway.; On Day 1, the islanders took part in a game of "Dicey Dares", in which they pick a dare and then roll a dice to determine whether they would have to complete the dare, or choose someone else to complete it instead.; On Day 2, the islanders competed in a game where one of them had to sit in a "hot seat" and answer a series of quick fire questions from their fellow islanders. If they wanted to pass on a question, they instead had to kiss an islander of their choice.
Week 1	Dates	On Day 3, single islanders Charlie and Ciaran went on a date with new islanders AJ and Samie.
Week 1	Exits	On Day 7, following a public vote for their favourite girl and their favourite boy, Millie and Scott received the most votes. The bottom three girls were revealed to be AJ, Jess, and Whitney, whilst the bottom three boys were Charlie, Konnor, and Sean. As the most popular islanders, Scott had to decide which girl to dump, whilst Millie had to decide which boy. They ultimately chose to dump AJ and Charlie from the villa respectively.
Week 2	Entrances	On Day 9, Curtis and Lucinda entered the villa.
Week 2	Coupling	On Day 10, the islanders recoupled. As the newest arrivals, Curtis and Lucinda were able to choose first and coupled up with Millie and Ciaran respectively. The girls then chose which boy they wanted to couple up with. Leanne and Scott remained together, whilst Belle chose Sean, Whitney chose Konnor, Helena chose Tommy, Jess chose Jack, leaving Samie to couple up with Shaq.
Week 2	Challenges	On Day 11, the islanders took part in a game of "It's Giving", in which each islander will choose a box, each with a characteristic hidden inside, and gift it to the All Star they think best suits the trait.
Week 2	Dates	On Day 8, Leanne and Scott left the villa to go on their first date.
Week 2	Exits	On Day 13, following a public vote for their favourite girl and their favourite boy, Samie and Sean received the most votes. The bottom three girls were revealed to be Leanne, Lucinda and Jess, whilst the bottom three boys were Curtis, Konnor, and Shaq. The two islanders with the least public votes, Jess and Shaq, were dumped from the villa.
Week 3	Entrances	On Day 14, USA bombshells Carrington, Imani, Kyra, Sher, Yamen and Zac entered villa USA.
Week 3	Coupling	On Day 18, the islanders recoupled. As the newest arrivals, the USA islanders were able to choose first. For the USA girls, Kyra chose Curtis, Imani chose Konnor and Sher chose Scott. For the USA boys, Zac chose Millie, Yamen chose Whitney and Carrington chose Helena. The boys then chose which girl they wanted to couple up with. Sean chose Lucinda, Ciaran chose Samie, Jack chose Belle and Tommy chose Leanne.
Week 3	Challenges	On Day 14, islanders in villa USA played a game of beer pong.; On Day 14, following the entrance of the USA bombshells, Belle, Ciaran, Helena, Jack, Millie, Scott, Tommy, and Whitney were chosen to enter villa USA to get to know them. The USA bombshells subsequently had to pick three girls and three boys to stay at villa USA with them. Helena and Scott were not chosen and returned to the main villa.; On Day 17, islanders played a game of spin the bottle where they had to complete a truth or a dare.; On Day 19, the Islanders took part in a game of "Snog, Marry, Pie", where both the boys and girls were tasked with choosing an islander of the any gender, to snog, marry and pie, using wedding rings and pies.
Week 3	Exits	On Day 20, following a public vote for their favourite couples, the bottom four couples were revealed to be Imani and Konnor, Kyra and Curtis, Lucinda and Sean and Sher and Scott. As they were the bottom two couples, Imani and Konnor and Kyra and Curtis were dumped from the villa.
Week 4	Entrances	On Day 22, Harrison and Jessy entered the villa.
Week 4	Coupling	On Day 25, the islanders recoupled. As the newest arrivals, Harrison and Jessy were able to choose first and coupled up with Belle and Tommy respectively. The girls then chose which boy they wanted to couple up with. Millie chose Zac, Leanne chose Scott, Sher chose Jack, Whitney chose Yamen, Lucinda chose Sean, Helena chose Carrington and Samie chose Ciaran.
Week 4	Challenges	On Day 22, the boys and girls competed in a challenge where they had to raise their opposing team's heart rate. At the end of the game they found out who raised their heart rate the most.; On Day 26, the couples competed in a game of "To Be Honest", where the Islanders in their couples will be asked a question and they must decide between themselves which other couple fits the bill.; On Day 28, the islanders took part in "Knowing Me, Knowing You", where the couples had to see how well they knew their partner.
Week 4	Dates	On Day 28, Whitney and Yamen left the villa to go on their first date.
Week 4	Exits	On Day 26, following the challenge, as the couple coming in last place, Sher and Jack were immediately dumped from the villa.
Week 5	Dates	On Day 31, the remaining couples each went on their final dates in the villa.
Week 5	Exits	On Day 29, following a public vote for their favourite couples, Lucinda and Sean received the most votes. The couple with the least public votes, Helena and Carrington, was then dumped from the villa.; On Day 31, after receiving the fewest public votes for most compatible couple, Jessy and Tommy were dumped from the island.; On Day 32, the dumped islanders returned to the villa to decide who should be dumped. Ciaran and Sammy, Millie and Zac and Whitney and Yamen did not receive any votes, whilst Shaq, Jack and Jessy all voted for Lucinda and Sean. Charlie, Curtis, Konnor and Helena all voted for Scott and Leanne. Meanwhile, Imani, AJ, Jess, Sher, Carrington, Kyra and Tommy all voted for Belle and Harrison, who were ultimately dumped from villa after receiving the most votes.; On Day 34, Whitney and Yamen finished in fifth place and Lucinda and Sean finished fourth, whilst Scott and Leanne finished third. Samie and Ciaran were announced as the winners, leaving Millie and Zac as runners-up.

== Episodes ==
No. overall	No. in series	Title	Day(s)	Original release date	Prod. code
Week 1
73	1	"Episode 1"	Day 1	15 January 2026	301
74	2	"Episode 2"	Days 1–2	16 January 2026	302
75	3	"Episode 3"	Days 2–3	17 January 2026	303
76	4	"Episode 4"	Days 3–4	18 January 2026	304
77	5	"Episode 5"	Days 4–5	19 January 2026	305
78	6	"Episode 6"	Days 5–6	20 January 2026	306
79	7	"Episode 7"	Days 6–7	21 January 2026	307
Week 2
80	8	"Episode 8"	Day 7–8	22 January 2026	308
81	9	"Episode 9"	Days 8–9	23 January 2026	309
82	10	"Episode 10: Unseen Bits"	N/A (Note: This episode showcased events from the previous days in the week. No new or present days were featured.)	24 January 2026	310
83	11	"Episode 11"	Days 9–10	25 January 2026	311
84	12	"Episode 12"	Days 10–11	26 January 2026	312
85	13	"Episode 13"	Days 11–12	27 January 2026	313
86	14	"Episode 14"	Days 12–13	28 January 2026	314
87	15	"Episode 15"	Days 13–14	29 January 2026	315
Week 3
88	16	"Episode 16"	Days 14–15	30 January 2026	316
89	17	"Episode 17: Unseen Bits"	N/A	31 January 2026	317
90	18	"Episode 18"	Days 15–16	1 February 2026	318
91	19	"Episode 19"	Days 16–17	2 February 2026	319
92	20	"Episode 20"	Day 17	3 February 2026	320
93	21	"Episode 21"	Day 18	4 February 2026	321
94	22	"Episode 22"	Day 19	5 February 2026	322
95	23	"Episode 23"	Day 20	6 February 2026	323
96	24	"Episode 24: Unseen Bits"	N/A	7 February 2026	324
97	25	"Episode 25"	Days 20–21	8 February 2026	325
Week 4
98	26	"Episode 26"	Day 22	9 February 2026	326
99	27	"Episode 27"	Days 22–23	10 February 2026	327
100	28	"Episode 28"	Days 23–24	11 February 2026	328
101	29	"Episode 29"	Day 25	12 February 2026	329
102	30	"Episode 30"	Day 26	13 February 2026	330
103	31	"Episode 31: Unseen Bits"	N/A	14 February 2026	331
104	32	"Episode 32"	Day 27	15 February 2026	332
105	33	"Episode 33"	Day 28	16 February 2026	333
Week 5
106	34	"Episode 34"	Days 28–29	17 February 2026	334
107	35	"Episode 35"	Day 30	18 February 2026	335
108	36	"Episode 36"	Days 30–31	19 February 2026	336
109	37	"Episode 37"	Days 31–32	20 February 2026	337
110	38	"Episode 38: Unseen Bits"	N/A	21 February 2026	338
111	39	"Episode 39"	Day 32	22 February 2026	339
112	40	"Episode 40"	Days 32–34	23 February 2026	340

== Ratings ==
Official 7-day consolidated ratings in the table below are taken from Thinkbox and include +1, but exclude viewership on devices.

	Viewers (millions)						
	Week 1	Week 2	Week 3	Week 4	Week 5	Week 6	Week 7
Sunday		1.19	1.21	1.20	1.34	1.30	1.26
Monday		1.16	1.23	1.20	1.24	1.38	1.01
Tuesday		1.09	1.19	1.24	1.18	1.27	
Wednesday		1.18	1.19	1.27	1.23	1.28	
Thursday	1.11	1.20	1.22	1.17	1.23	1.19	
Friday	1.25	1.12	1.21	1.29	1.31	1.12	
Saturday	1.15						
Weekly average	1.17	1.16	1.21	1.23	1.26	1.26	1.14
Running average	1.17	1.17	1.18	1.19	1.21	1.22	1.20
Series average	1.20						
Unseen Bits		0.30	0.20	0.22	0.26	0.22	
