= Olivia Bowen =

English reality television personality (born 1994)

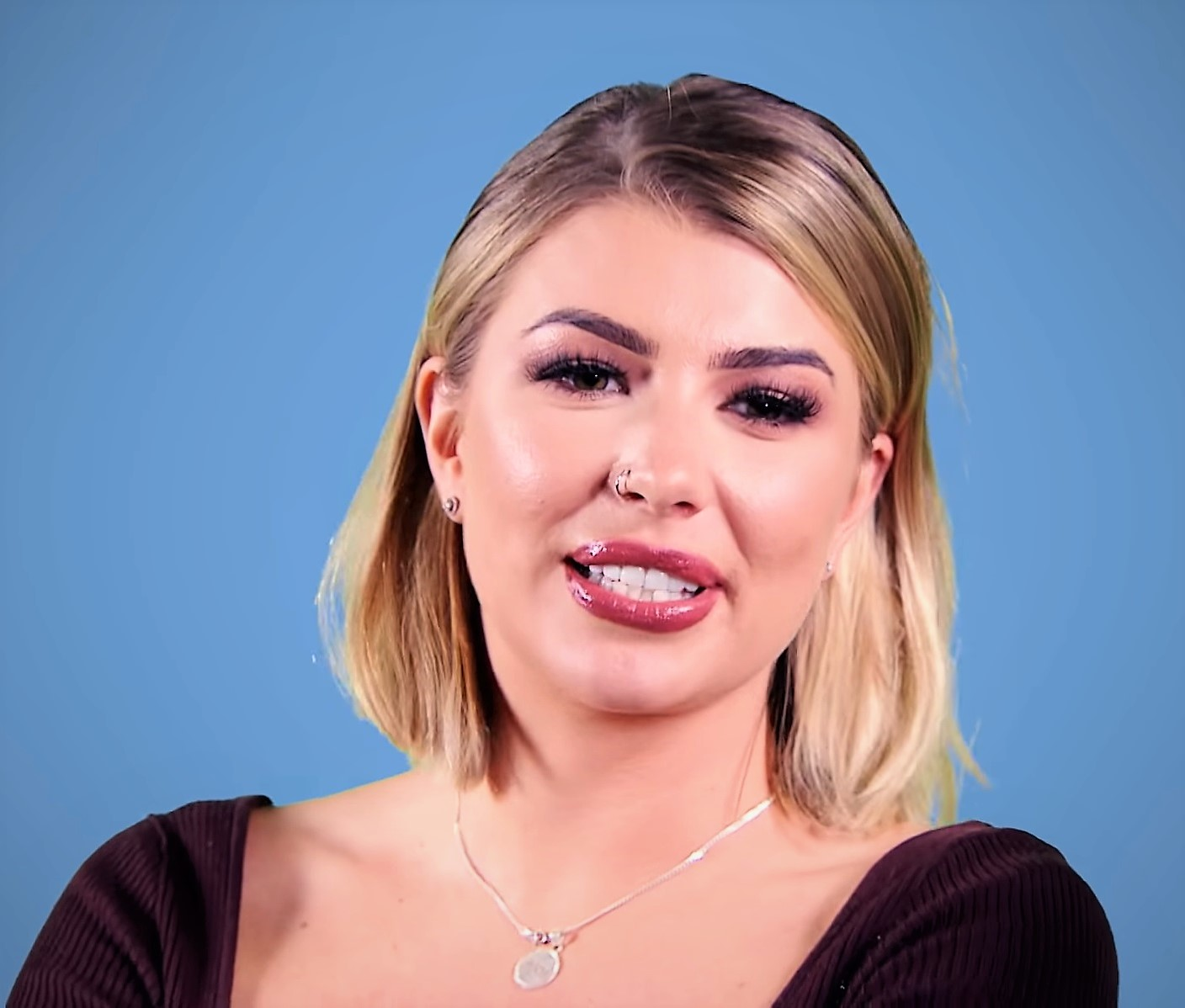
- Bowen in 2018
- Born: 3 January 1994 (age 32); Chelmsford, Essex, England
- Other name: Olivia Buckland
- Occupation: Television personality
- Spouse: Alex Bowen (m. 2018)
- Children: 2

Olivia Bowen (née Buckland; born 3 January 1994) is an English reality television personality.

Bowen was runner-up on the second series of Love Island in 2016, with Alex Bowen. In 2017, they became engaged and she featured on an episode of Say Yes to the Dress.

In 2017, she launched her own clothing range with MissPap. From July 2017, Buckland started maternity cover for Ferne McCann on This Morning, presenting different features throughout the summer as well as being the resident Love Island reporter alongside Chloe Crowhurst. Bowen also covered for Rylan Clark-Neal on Fridays throughout the summer for the showbiz section of the show whilst he presented the main show.

In 2018, they filmed the TLC programmes, Olivia and Alex Said Yes.

== Personal life ==
Bowen married Alex Bowen on 15 September 2018 in Essex. In June 2022, she gave birth to their son. In August 2025, she gave birth to their second child, a daughter.

Bowen has discussed her postpartum fitness journey after giving birth to her son in June 2022.

In February 2025, People Magazine reported about the Bowens' traumatic loss due to vanishing twin syndrome (VTS). The condition "occurs when a twin or multiple disappears in the uterus during pregnancy as a result of a miscarriage of one twin or multiple. The fetal tissue is absorbed by the other twin, multiple, placenta, or the mother. This gives the appearance of a “vanishing twin.”"

== Interior Design ==
Bowen developed an interest in interior design during the COVID-19 lockdown, when she completed an interior design course. She has said her interest grew partly from followers asking for advice after seeing work she had done on her own home. In 2026, she launched an interior design application called Interior Design Clinic, in which users describe a desired room, receive a generated design, and can shop for the items featured.
