= Scott van-der-Sluis =

Welsh footballer (born 2001)

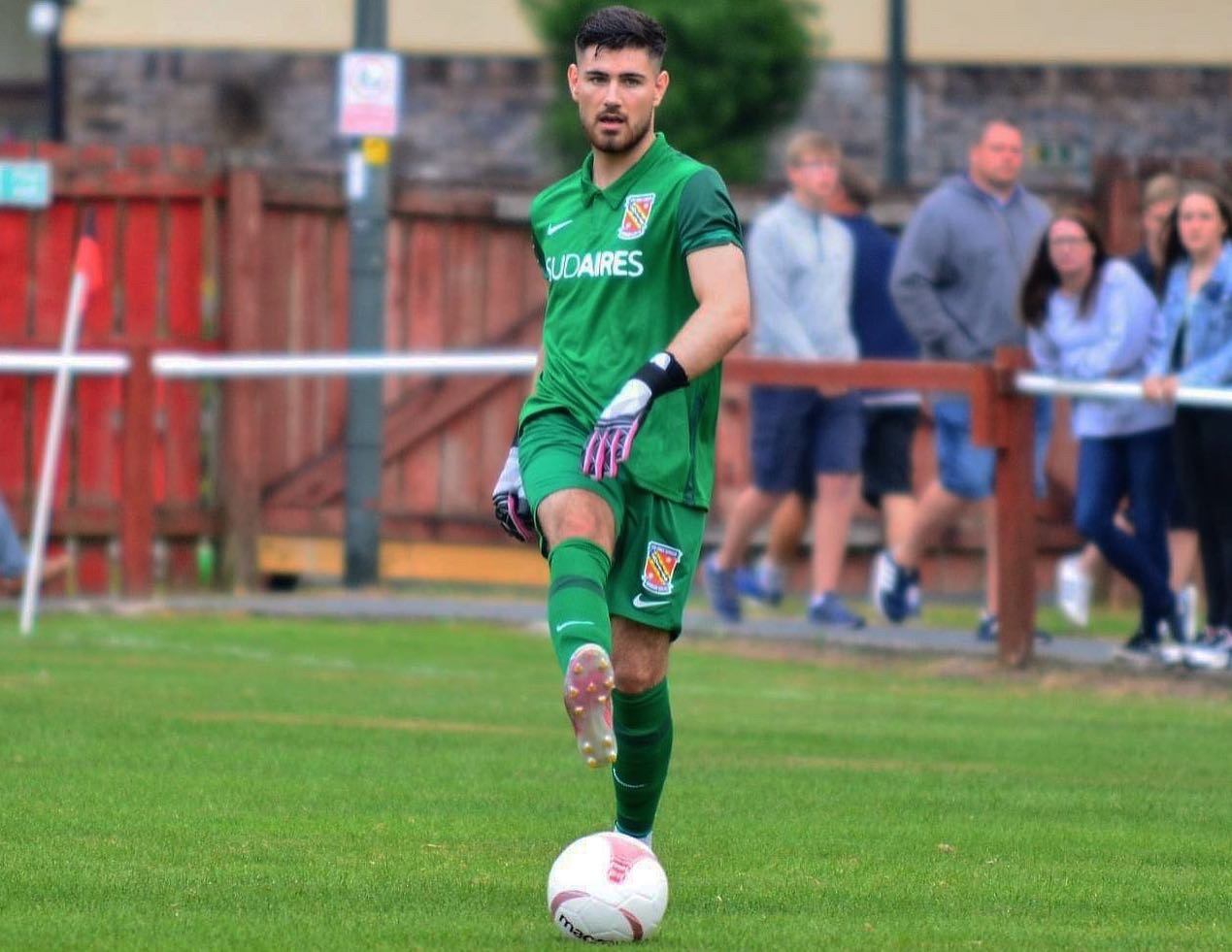
- Van-der-Sluis playing for Bangor City in 2021

Personal information
- Birth name: Scott van-der-Sluis
- Date of birth: 9 January 2001 (age 25)
- Place of birth: Connah's Quay, Wales
- Position: Goalkeeper

Youth career
- 2009–2010: Manchester United
- 2010–2014: Liverpool
- 2015–2018: Swansea City

Senior career*
Years	Team	Apps	(Gls)
2018–2019	Swansea City	0	(0)
2019	→ Merthyr Town (loan)	10	(0)
2020	Northwich Victoria	11	(0)
2020	Runcorn Linnets	6	(0)
2020–2021	City of Liverpool	1	(0)
2021–2022	Bangor City	8	(0)
2022	Runcorn Linnets	5	(0)
2022–2023	Shelbourne	0	(0)
2024	Widnes		
2025	Bangor City 1876		

International career
2014–2016	Wales U15	6	(0)
2016	Wales U16	3	(0)
2017	Wales U17	1	(0)
- * Club domestic league appearances and goals as of 18:43, 17 August 2023 (UTC)

Scott van-der-Sluis (born 9 January 2001) is a Welsh professional footballer, who plays as a goalkeeper. In 2023, he appeared as a contestant on the tenth series of Love Island and the fifth series of Love Island USA, as well as the spin-off Love Island Games. In 2026, he appeared on the third series of Love Island: All Stars, finishing in third place.

== Club career ==
=== Early career ===
Van-der-Sluis signed for Manchester United as an eight-year-old in 2009. A boyhood Liverpool fan, he moved to the Reds' academy in 2010 and spent five seasons with the club.

After leaving Liverpool in 2015, Van-der-Sluis joined Swansea City and moved to South Wales for four years, leaving at the expiration of his contract in 2019.

He also played in the English non-league system, for Northwich Victoria, Runcorn Linnets and Merthyr Town.

=== Bangor City ===
In 2021, Van-der-Sluis came back to his native North Wales and signed for Cymru Leagues club Bangor City, quickly establishing himself as club-captain. However, following a Football Association of Wales league suspension that stopped the club from playing matches, Van-der-Sluis left the club in early 2022.

=== Shelbourne ===
On 16 June 2022, Van-der-Sluis signed for League of Ireland Premier Division club Shelbourne. On 26 August 2022, he made his debut for Shelbourne, keeping a clean sheet in a 4-0 FAI Cup win against Bonagee United. On 30 November 2022, he renewed his contract with Shelbourne for the upcoming 2023 season.

In June 2023, it was announced that he had left the club without making a league appearance, in order to participate on Love Island. Shelbourne manager Damien Duff said Van-der-Sluis would not be returning to the club.

In late 2025 he joined Bangor City 1876 but did not make a first-team appearance.

== International career ==
Van-der-Sluis has represented Wales at U15, U16 and U17 level a total of 10 times, winning the Victory Shield in 2015.

== Personal life ==
Van-der-Sluis is the younger brother of former footballer Jamie Reed.

== Love Island ==
In 2023, Van-der-Sluis was confirmed as a contestant on the tenth series of Love Island, entering the villa as a bombshell on Day 11 and departing on Day 52.. Less than a month after leaving the British version, Van-der-Sluis joined the fifth series of Love Island USA where he was eliminated after just one week. He then took part in the spin-off Love Island Games, where he was dumped after three days. Since he appeared on three different versions of the Love Island franchise in under three months, he became one of the most frequent contestants to appear in the show's history. In 2026, Van-der-Sluis entered the third series of Love Island: All Stars as the first bombshell on Day 1, reaching the final alongside partner Leanne Amaning and finishing in third place.
