= Zara Holland =

English television personality

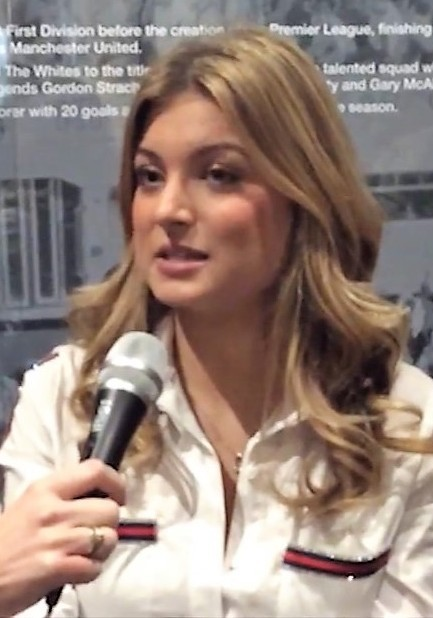
- Holland in 2018
- Born: Kingston upon Hull, England
- Occupation: Television personality
- Years active: 2014–present
- Television: Love Island (2016)
- Spouse: Elliott Love (m. 2023)

Zara Holland is an English television personality best known for taking part in the second series of the reality show Love Island on ITV2. She formerly held the title of Miss Great Britain.

== Life and career ==
In June 2016 she took part in ITV2's Love Island; while on the show she went on a date with contestant Alex Bowen and had sex with him. She was subsequently stripped of her Miss Great Britain title, a decision that proved controversial.

In January 2021 Holland was arrested by police in Barbados and charged with breaching coronavirus laws during the COVID-19 pandemic. Holland was alleged to have breached a mandatory period of quarantine upon arrival to the country. On 6 January, she was found guilty and fined Bds$12,000 (£4,417).

In 2023, she married Elliott Love in a ceremony hosted in Greece.
