= Kady McDermott =

English television personality and social media influencer (born 1995)

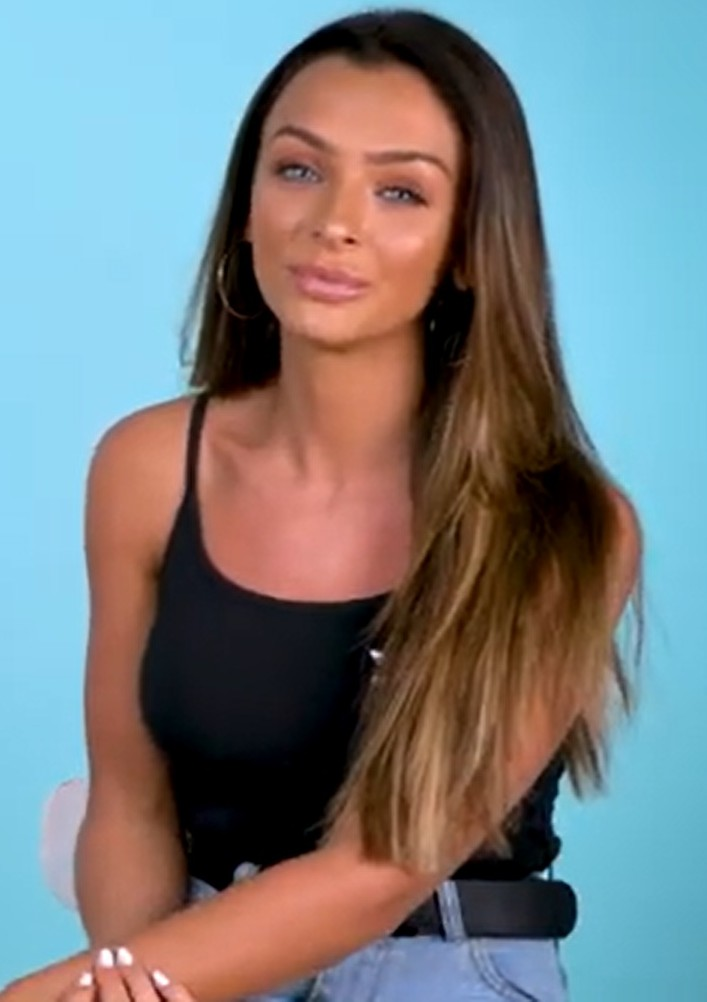
- McDermott in 2019
- Born: Kady Harriet McDermott; 4 September 1995 (age 30); Stevenage, Hertfordshire, England
- Occupations: Television personality; social media influencer
- Television: Love Island; The Only Way Is Essex
- Partner: Scott Thomas (2016–2017)

Kady Harriet McDermott (born 4 September 1995) is an English television personality and social media influencer, known for her appearances as a contestant on the second and tenth series of Love Island, in 2016 and 2023 respectively.

== Life and career ==
Kady Harriet McDermott was born on 4 September 1995 in Stevenage, Hertfordshire, and prior to appearing on television, she worked as a make-up artist. In 2016, McDermott became a contestant on the second series of Love Island. She was voted into the villa by the public as a "bombshell" on the third day of the series and eventually coupled up with Scott Thomas, with whom she reached the final and finished in third place. Following her appearance on the show, McDermott began working as an influencer. In 2017, she was scheduled to switch on the Christmas lights in Welwyn Garden City, the town she grew up in, however angry residents started a petition arguing that having a contestant from Love Island switching on the lights was "setting a bad example", a point McDermott argued against on an episode of Good Morning Britain. McDermott was later dropped from the light switch-on, with organisers stating that they didn't expect such a "strong reaction".

In 2018, McDermott joined the cast of the ITVBe reality series The Only Way Is Essex for the show's twenty-third series, as she was dating cast member Myles Barnett at the time. In 2022, McDermott was signed up to appear on Celebs Go Dating but was later "dropped from the series".

In 2023, McDermott returned to the Love Island villa as a "bombshell" in the tenth series, seven years after her original appearance. She became the second contestant in the show's history to participate in another series, after Adam Collard. McDermott was dumped from the island on Day 44 alongside Ouzy See at the VIP Beach Party.

== Filmography ==
As herself
Year	Title	Notes	Ref.
2016	Love Island	Contestant; series 2	
2017	Good Morning Britain	Guest	
2018	The Only Way Is Essex	Cast member; series 23	
2023	Love Island	Contestant; series 10	
