= Tricked (Canadian TV series) =

Canadian television series

- Starring: Eric Leclerc
- Countries of origin: Canada (Season 1); United States (Season 2-3)
- Original language: English
- No. of series: 3
- No. of episodes: 44

Production
- Running time: 30 minutes (inc. adverts)
- Production companies: Force Four Entertainment; ITV Studios Global Entertainment

Original release
- Network: YTV; BYUtv; Universal Kids
- Release: September 5, 2016

Tricked is a Canadian television series that originally premiered on YTV in September 2016 and BYUtv in October 2016. Starring magician and YouTube personality Eric Leclerc, the series features Leclerc performing magic tricks as hidden-camera pranks. In addition to BYUtv the series has also aired in the US on Universal Kids.

During season 1 YTV helped produce the episodes in conjunction with ITV Studios. For season 2 YTV was replaced in the credits by BYUtv. Season 2 also saw a shift from occurring in Canada to occurring in New York City.

The series is based on Ben Hanlin's British television program Tricked, which premiered in 2013.

== Series overview ==
Season	Episodes	Originally released	
Season	Episodes	First released	Last released
1	20	September 5, 2016	October 6, 2016
2	12	October 8, 2018	March 25, 2019
3	12	September 30, 2019	January 20, 2020

== Episodes ==
=== Season 1 (2016) ===
No. overall	No. in season	Title	Original release date
1	1	"Food"	September 5, 2016 (YTV); October 1, 2016 (BYUtv)
Watch as Eric Leclerc blends food and magic together in unpredictable ways. Some of the tricks include turning a salad into a chicken, hiding an orange in a watermelon, hiding a ring inside an eclair, and turning table scraps into compost.
2	2	"Creativity"	September 6, 2016 (YTV); October 10, 2016 (BYUtv)
Eric shows off the new Drinkomatic 5000, a coffee pot that can make any drink fresh as long as it's not hot. He also creates the freshest cookie imaginable, lets kids set him up in a unique art post that has a statue copying him, and repairs a torn $1200 picture as though it were new.
3	3	"Health"	September 7, 2016 (YTV); October 17, 2016 (BYUtv)
Eric turns bread into food for ducks and geese, a new health trend called internal flossing is created, and endless items like chips, cream, and sugar bewilder spectators at restaurants and in a food court.
4	4	"Technology"	September 8, 2016 (YTV); October 24, 2016 (BYUtv)
Eric illustrates new technology by showing off DNA gum that can reveal a person's thoughts, ways to recover a phone when it has been lost on a public street (even if it's lost in the sewer), and teleportation of drivers licenses.
5	5	"Family"	September 12, 2016 (YTV); October 31, 2016 (BYUtv)
Eric brings kids toys to them in the park through an interdimensional portal, he shows a group in the park how friends and family support each other, he takes pictures of families in a local cafe that come out slightly different than expected, and he takes a couple through the experience of Cafe Leclerc.
6	6	"Fashion"	September 13, 2016 (YTV); November 7, 2016 (BYUtv)
Eric makes accessories appear from paper and attends the London School to cause some mischief among upcoming designers. Additionally kids try to figure how he gets a crayon through a quarter.
7	7	"Sports"	September 14, 2016 (YTV); November 14, 2016 (BYUtv)
Eric shows off games of chance at a golf putt practice game, with a soccer club throwing balls at random boxes, and with a sailor and his friend showing how easily knots and rope can pass through someone if they've been properly trained.
8	8	"Travel"	September 15, 2016 (YTV); November 21, 2016 (BYUtv)
Eric has people use the power of their minds to determine different travel locations through postcards, snow globes, and even a random picture. What makes it even crazier is when they randomly produce items of travel blind folded to said locations.
9	9	"Music"	September 19, 2016 (YTV); November 28, 2016 (BYUtv)
In his latest magic show Eric displays a new shoe cleaner that works by sound until it goes awry, he cuts a teenagers earphones, and he visits the Nimbus School of Recording Arts to display how magic and sound can work together to confound the mind.
10	10	"Work"	September 20, 2016 (YTV); December 5, 2016 (BYUtv)
Eric performs magic tricks at a local office featuring everyday items like a pen, paper, a copier, money, and even a moving box and duct tape. However, none of the individuals know they're his latest magic show guests.
11	11	"Money"	September 21, 2016 (YTV); December 12, 2016 (BYUtv)
Eric visits the local mall to introduce e-money, or programmable money. Other tricks include multiplying a $5 to become a $50 bill and making one individual's ring appear in an unexpected location.
12	12	"Emotions"	September 22, 2016 (YTV); February 6, 2017 (BYUtv)
For his latest set of tricks Eric has people write down the strongest negative emotions they can think of. Imagine their shock when those words of emotion change into the exact opposite emotion, handwriting and all. In an additional trick Eric shows how fear can be a worthwhile magic tool when it's unexpected.
13	13	"Energy"	September 26, 2016 (YTV); February 13, 2017 (BYUtv)
Eric and the Tricked team focus on the four forms of energy: Positive Energy, Negative Energy, Emotional Energy, and Physical Energy. Among the magic tricks shown are Eric creating a photograph in his mouth, recycling a light bulb by eating it, purifying salt water with two regular cups, and creating a comfortable yoga mat with glass inside of it.
14	14	"Farm"	September 27, 2016 (YTV); February 20, 2017 (BYUtv)
Eric lets kids randomly select toy animals from a bag before roping them out. Also at a farm house he lets someone draw a random color before copying it identically in the bag and then making 8 people appear with the exact same outfit, including himself under a jumpsuit. It's all part of farm themed magic tricks that'll blow your mind.
15	15	"Entertainment"	September 28, 2016 (YTV); February 27, 2017 (BYUtv)
Eric performs random tricks at a house party, has rope appear up his sleeve that rips something unexpected, and performs some surprise unbirthday tricks at the TRKD Cafe.
16	16	"School"	September 29, 2016 (YTV); March 6, 2017 (BYUtv)
Eric displays a chalkboard that can solve math problems by itself to school kids, he turns flash cards into solid steel at a school library, and he leads an old fashioned family rivalry (big brother vs. little sister) in an unexpected school activity.
17	17	"Secrets"	October 3, 2016 (YTV); March 13, 2017 (BYUtv)
Eric introduces a special lite popcorn that is so lite it can float into your mouth. Next Eric plays some tricks on some ladies at the photo studio. What other spooky tricks will cause the heart to pound on unexpected spooky episode of Tricked?
18	18	"Games & Luck"	October 4, 2016 (YTV); March 20, 2017 (BYUtv)
Eric tries to solve a rubik cube behind his back with unsuspecting fans only to mystify them when they have the same pattern. Meanwhile at the cafe Eric produces a bag that contains unexpected random items people name. How is it water moves from one cup to another without sleight of hand? Eric produces unexpected magic with rubber bands. He also shows how an individual can win a free soda, and at the bowling alley he has people determine if games are determined by skills, trick, or luck.
19	19	"Weather"	October 5, 2016 (YTV); March 27, 2017 (BYUtv)
Eric changes a soda can from ice cold to boiling hot. At the garden center he uses a spray to magically repair broken items as it protects it against the elements. At the mall he conjures water out of thin air from a hand drawn ice cube. Meanwhile Cafe Leclerc has made up charities that they donate people's money to without asking. Finally random card tricks are performed with candy and gum.
20	20	"Friends"	October 6, 2016 (YTV); April 3, 2017 (BYUtv)
Eric creates friendship bracelets from random letters in his mouth. He also has never ending gum appear in his mouth, and some mischief at Cafe Leclerc causes people to think friends that mysteriously appear inside the magic board. Also what happens when people sign a blank sheet of paper that turns into a check addressed to Eric, and what random mischief will he pull at the library this time?

=== Season 2 (2018–19) ===
On September 8, 2018 Tricked announced on their Facebook page that season 2 would premiere on BYUtv October 8, 2018. For season 2 YTV is removed from the production credits and is replaced by BYUtv.

No. overall	No. in season	Title	Original release date
21	1	"Mouse Multiplication"	October 8, 2018
Some families and friends decide to set up their loved ones. Among the tricks are pizzas that fall on the floor before reappearing in the box brand new, ice cream made in a bag, and a DNA multiplying machine that turns one mouse into a dozen mice.
22	2	"Moving Magic"	October 15, 2018
In his latest set of magical tricks Eric debuts a new ice cream app that costs $1.50 and will place any topping you want on your ice cream. Up next some young shoppers are introduced to the newest puzzle- a puzzle that will change randomly based on the DNA of the individual who touches it. Finally what happens to a pizza delivery man when a lady magically disappears in front of him, and what will the reaction be of some friendly pedestrians who agree to watch Eric's moving supplies?
23	3	"Balloon Donut"	October 22, 2018
Eric is once again up to his trickery as he introduces a new lighter than air donut, a donut trapped inside a balloon that appears when it's popped. Later on Eric performs some jelly bean magic where he guesses exactly how many jelly beans are pulled out of a jar and the colors each of them have. Finally Eric plays some cupcake magic on one girl who's always pranking her father.
24	4	"Phone Meltdown"	October 29, 2018
Eric explodes a phone that has been brought in for repair, he conducts interviews in the park for a special newscast with individuals who are willing to help only to watch his shirt rip into many pieces, he introduces some new special technology at a pet store, and what happens when Eric lets people in the park create his new bands nickname?
25	5	"Big Burger"	November 5, 2018
In this episode a pair of brothers watches a burger get upsized before their eyes, a new toy fish is introduced that seems rather lifelike, a new cell phone theft app plays havoc with unsuspecting customers, and some people watch as posters are turned back into their rain forest roots.
26	6	"Tube Chips"	November 12, 2018
Eric's newest set of tricks include creating a refillable set of Pringles, saving cellphone from a mail-in rebate that requires the phone, reforming a newspaper from scraps, refilling a can of ginger ale as part of a new recycling method, introducing a new waterproof cellphone method for rainy days, and teasing some pizza delivery drivers when he makes their freshly made pizzas turn ice cold.
27	7	"Necklace Bust"	November 19, 2018
Eric's newest tricks include reassembling an antique necklace after it has fallen apart, attempting to watch kids dump water on their friends heads, assembling a new tie from the mere description, tricking a bunch of people in the bookstore, and watching customers be mystified as their credit cards and assets appear to be frozen.
28	8	"Key Hanger"	November 26, 2018
A free key copy promotion has unexpected effects when one key gets caught on a hanger, cleaning art has unexpected side effects when the compressed air turns into spray paint, Eric turns coins into strange tattoos on kids in the park, some Tic Tacs and then some change go astray when they fall out of the container and then get caught underneath the glass counter, a custom set of cards becomes life like, and a new system creates an entire book based solely off the cover.
29	9	"Book Worm"	December 3, 2018
Eric displays a new type of pop-up book where fishing becomes lifelike, kids get up close and personal with a balloon animal dog that is able to perform tricks and gets magically reassembled after getting popped. a new chocolate machine turns everything in the store into a chocolate surprise, phones float in midair at a local bookstore, and a local grocery store has a special fruit loot promotion with cash prizes hidden inside free unopened fruit.
30	10	"Broken Tray"	December 10, 2018
Trouble arises when a handle breaks off of a $21,000 vase causing it to fall to the ground and shatter. Will Eric have the steam to restore it? Meanwhile chaos is caused in a hot dog shop when Eric uses instant heat sheets on an uncooked hot dog and raw dough. Meanwhile at an art exhibit opening Renaldo brings in people to help clean up, but problems occur when one exhibit isn't supposed to be dusted. Finally Eric makes names appear on a sheet of paper that people call out, and finally Eric helps make gems with a new chemistry experiment, but when smoke appears in a container unexpected consequences occur.
31	11	"Big Golf"	December 17, 2018
Eric introduces the little caddy for mini golf beginners, a fake plant made of metal somehow produces real flowers, a random game of chance allows Eric to change garbage juice into pure water, clairvoyant powers are explored, and a scorpion is restored from amber in a school lab.
32	12	"Bag of Treats"	March 25, 2019
In the season finale Eric uses instant refill bags to provide an endless supply of gummy bears with both sizes and colors varying. In other tricks Eric smokes names onto hot dogs for unsuspecting customers, a random card trick is performed with Eric having his mouth taped shut, gold is produced on various objects at a new exhibit, bubbles are turned into bouncing balls, and random id's are lost in some bread batter but then randomly appear in the middle of freshly baked bread.

=== Season 3 (2019–20) ===
No. overall	No. in season	Title	Original release date
33	1	"Already Been Chewed"	September 30, 2019
The new season begins with Eric in a candy shop where he introduces the chew undo, a new machine that restores any candy that has been chewed to its original form. However, when Eric combines multiple candies together, it has some unexpected consequences. Up next Eric heads to a flower shop where he shows a new flower delivery method that has guests flabbergasted, floral portation, a special machine that instantly transports floral deliveries. When Eric poses as a comic book seller, some chaos occurs when he shows a guest the extremely rare issue #1 of Smash-Man that ends up ripping. Finally Eric does a random survey at an office where those doing the survey experience writer's block. First people are unable to open the pen. Then they're unable to write with it. Finally a set of papers that has been filed falls off the cabinet and freaks out everyone when his assistant Raquel appears behind a large paper map.
34	2	"Instant Instrument"	October 7, 2019
The Tricked team heads to a music school where the team attempts to outplay a young man with some special tools and a very special new method, the music marker. Up next Eric decides to spice things up at a local fast food restaurant where a brand new hot sauce is being introduced, the Face Melter. Eric decides to test it in front of customers, but things go crazy when smoke begins to come out of his mouth. Up next flames begin spitting out of the sauce, and finally the sauce melts a plate of fries straight through a tray. Up next Eric shows some kids in the park a very special custom card that moves to the top or bottom when people yell up or down at it. The fun continues when Eric debuts a new banana that cuts up itself and a special cup that turns cut fruit into an environmentally safe smoothie. Finally Eric introduces the brand new self cushioning bag that keeps all food from being crushed.
35	3	"Really Sticky Glue"	October 14, 2019
Eric introduces a new product, Invisi-Glue, to a young upcoming magician Thomas, but can Thomas figure out Eric's tricks when his phone and his hand get suck to the table? Up next Eric provides some unexpected treats to unexpected customers in the candy store. For his third trick Eric brings a bowling ball to the grocery store through unexpected means. Then Eric goes to a jewelry store where an unexpected guest watches her boyfriends watch get destroyed before her eyes. Finally Eric heads to White Castle Burgers where he gives away free onion rings, but when two come out together a new untangling salt may be the very solution needed for amazement.
36	4	"Prize Surprise"	October 21, 2019
37	5	"Mouth to Mouse"	October 28, 2019
38	6	"Jungle Board Games"	November 4, 2019
39	7	"Lights Out"	November 11, 2019
40	8	"Quick Change"	November 18, 2019
41	9	"Time Travel Cooking"	November 25, 2019
42	10	"Concessions Through Glass"	December 3, 2019
Eric's tricks include rescuing a set of keys from a locked concession stand, investigating kids bowling balls to make sure they haven't been rigged with hamsters to always get a strike, testing a hot sauce that catches things on fire, and saling a tent that seems to turn a husband back into a kid.
43	11	"Bag Name Change"	January 13, 2020
44	12	"Origami Dove"	January 20, 2020
