= Love Island (2015 TV series) series 10 =

2023 series of Love Island

Love Island
- Series 10
- Presented by: Maya Jama
- No. of days: 58
- No. of contestants: 32
- Winners: Jess Harding; Sammy Root
- Runners-up: Whitney Adebayo; Lochan Nowacki
- Companion show: Love Island: Aftersun
- No. of episodes: 49

Release
- Original network: ITV2
- Original release: 5 June – 31 July 2023

Series chronology
- ← Previous; Series 9 Next → Series 11

The tenth series of Love Island began broadcasting on 5 June 2023 on ITV2. Maya Jama returned to present the series, with Iain Stirling again returning as narrator.

On 31 July 2023, the series was won by Jess Harding and Sammy Root with 34.57% of the final vote. Lochan Nowacki and Whitney Adebayo finished as runners-up.

== Production ==
In June 2022, during the broadcasting of the eighth series, it was confirmed that the show would return for two series in 2023, the first of which was the ninth series which aired earlier in 2023 between January and March. It is the first time in the show's history that two series have aired in the same year. The tenth series began on 5 June 2023 and was filmed in Sant Llorenç des Cardassar, Mallorca. Applications for the series opened hours prior to the final episode of the ninth series. Maya Jama was announced to be returning for her second series as presenter, whilst Iain Stirling who has narrated the show since its inception in 2015, again returned as narrator. Further duty of care procedures were implemented by ITV and as in the previous series, contestants were asked to "pause their social media accounts" to "shield [the contestants] and their families' from trolls' abuse".

== Islanders ==
The original Islanders for the tenth series were announced on 29 May 2023, one week before the series launch. The series featured returning contestant Kady McDermott, who previously appeared in the second series back in 2016.

Islander	Age	Hometown	Entered	Exited	Status	Ref
Jess Harding	22	Uxbridge	Day 1	Day 58	Winner	
Sammy Root	22	Dartford	Day 4	Day 58	Winner	
Lochan Nowacki	25	Bermondsey	Day 26	Day 58	Runner-up	
Whitney Adebayo	25	Camden	Day 3	Day 58	Runner-up	
Ella Thomas	23	Glasgow	Day 1	Day 58	Third place	
Tyrique Hyde	24	Grays	Day 1	Day 58	Third place	
Molly Marsh	21	Doncaster	Day 27 (Note: Dumped Islander Molly re-entered the villa during Casa Amor.)	Day 58	Fourth place	
Molly Marsh	21	Doncaster	Day 1	Day 19	Dumped	
Zachariah Noble	25	Lewisham	Day 1	Day 58	Fourth place	
Ella Barnes	23	Ashford	Day 39	Day 56	Dumped	
Mitchel Taylor	26	Sheffield	Day 1	Day 56	Dumped	
Abi Moores	25	Hampshire	Day 27	Day 52	Dumped	
Scott van-der-Sluis	22	Connah's Quay	Day 11	Day 52	Dumped	
Kady McDermott	27	Stevenage	Day 19	Day 44	Dumped	
Ousman "Ouzy" See	28	Edinburgh	Day 26	Day 44	Dumped	
Amber Wise	19	Kensington	Day 27	Day 44	Dumped	
Josh Brocklebank	26	Brentwood	Day 39	Day 44	Dumped	
Leah Taylor	27	Manchester	Day 8	Day 38	Dumped	
Montel McKenzie	25	London	Day 16	Day 38	Dumped	
Catherine Agbaje	22	Tyrrelstown	Day 1	Day 38	Dumped	
Elom Ahlijah-Wilson	22	Enfield	Day 26	Day 38	Dumped	
Benjamin Noel	26	London	Day 26	Day 31	Dumped	
Danielle Mazhindu	25	Liverpool	Day 27	Day 31	Dumped	
Gabrielle "Gabby" Jeffery	24	Tyneside	Day 27	Day 31	Dumped	
Kodie Murphy	20	Birmingham	Day 26	Day 31	Dumped	
Tink Reading	26	Birmingham	Day 27	Day 31	Dumped	
Zachary Ashford	27	Manchester	Day 26	Day 31	Dumped	
Mal Nicol	25	Edinburgh	Day 16	Day 23	Dumped	
Mehdi Edno	26	Bordeaux, France	Day 1	Day 23	Dumped	
André Furtado	21	Dudley	Day 1	Day 12	Dumped	
Charlotte Sumner	30	Bournemouth	Day 8	Day 12	Dumped	
Ruchee Gurung	24	Sutton	Day 1	Day 9	Dumped	
George Fensom	24	Bedford	Day 1	Day 5	Dumped	

== Future appearances ==
In 2023, Scott van-der-Sluis appeared on Love Island USA season 5 and season 1 of Love Island Games.

In 2024, Mitchel Taylor appeared on season 1 of Love Island: All Stars.

In 2025, Catherine Agbaje, Montel Mckenzie and Sammy Root appeared on season 2 of Love Island: All Stars. Tyrique Hyde competed on season two of Love Island Games.

In 2026, Jess Harding, Whitney Adebayo and van-der-Sluis returned for series three of Love Island: All Stars.

== Coupling and elimination history ==
	Week 1			Week 2			Week 3				Week 4	Week 5	Week 6			Week 7		Week 8	Week 9		
	Day 1	Day 2	Day 5	Day 9		Day 12	Day 14	Day 16	Day 18	Day 19	Day 23	Day 31	Day 36	Day 38	Day 39	Day 42	Day 44	Day 52	Day 56		Final
Jess	George		Sammy	Sammy	Safe	Safe	Sammy	Leah & Mitchel; Catherine & Scott; Least compatible	Mitchel		Safe	Single	Sammy	Vulnerable	Josh	Sammy	Safe	Safe	Ella B & Mitchel; Least compatible	Finalist	Winner (Day 58)
Sammy	Not in Villa		Jess	Jess	Safe	Vulnerable	Jess	Leah & Mitchel; Catherine & Scott; Least compatible	Mal		Safe	Amber	Jess	Vulnerable	Single	Jess	Safe	Safe	Ella B & Mitchel; Least compatible	Finalist	Winner (Day 58)
Lochan	Not in Villa											Whitney	Whitney	Safe	Whitney	Whitney	Ella B & Mitchel to save	Safe	Ella B & Mitchel; Least compatible	Finalist	Runner-up (Day 58)
Whitney	Not in Villa		Mehdi	Mehdi	Safe	Safe	Mehdi	Jess & Sammy; Leah & Mitchel; Least compatible	Mehdi		Safe	Lochan	Lochan	Safe	Lochan	Lochan	Ella B & Mitchel to save	Safe	Ella B & Mitchel; Least compatible	Finalist	Runner-up (Day 58)
Ella T	Tyrique		Tyrique	Single	Vulnerable	Safe	Tyrique	Catherine & Scott; Leah & Mitchel; Least compatible	Tyrique		Safe	Ouzy	Tyrique	Safe	Tyrique	Tyrique	Safe	Safe	Ella B & Mitchel; Least compatible	Finalist	Third place (Day 58)
Tyrique	Ella T		Ella T	Leah	Safe	Safe	Ella T	Catherine & Scott; Leah & Mitchel; Least compatible	Ella T		Safe	Single	Ella T	Safe	Ella T	Ella T	Safe	Safe	Ella B & Mitchel; Least compatible	Finalist	Third place (Day 58)
Molly	Mitchel		Mitchel	Mitchel	Safe	Safe	Zachariah	Jess & Sammy; Leah & Mitchel; Least compatible	Zachariah	Single	Dumped (Day 19)	Zachariah	Zachariah	Safe	Zachariah	Zachariah	Safe	Vulnerable	Ella B & Mitchel; Least compatible	Finalist	Fourth place (Day 58)
Zachariah	Not in Villa	Catherine	Catherine	Charlotte	Safe	Vulnerable	Molly	Jess & Sammy; Leah & Mitchel; Least compatible	Molly	Kady	Safe	Molly	Molly	Safe	Molly	Molly	Safe	Vulnerable	Ella B & Mitchel; Least compatible	Finalist	Fourth place (Day 58)
Ella B	Not in Villa														Mitchel	Mitchel	Vulnerable	Vulnerable	Lochan & Whitney; Least compatible	Eliminated	Dumped (Day 56)
Mitchel	Molly		Molly	Molly	Safe	Safe	Leah	Jess & Sammy; Mehdi & Whitney; Least compatible	Jess		Safe	Abi	Abi	Safe	Ella B	Ella B	Vulnerable	Vulnerable	Lochan & Whitney; Least compatible	Eliminated	Dumped (Day 56)
Abi	Not in Villa											Mitchel	Mitchel	Safe	Single	Scott	Safe	Vulnerable	Dumped (Day 52)		
Scott	Not in Villa					Immune	Catherine	Jess & Sammy; Leah & Mitchel; Least compatible	Catherine		Safe	Single	Amber	Safe	Amber	Abi	Safe	Vulnerable	Dumped (Day 52)		
Kady	Not in Villa									Zachariah	Safe	Single	Ouzy	Vulnerable	Ouzy	Ouzy	Vulnerable	Dumped (Day 44)			
Ouzy	Not in Villa											Ella T	Kady	Vulnerable	Kady	Kady	Vulnerable	Dumped (Day 44)			
Amber	Not in Villa											Sammy	Scott	Safe	Scott	Josh	Eliminated	Dumped (Day 44)			
Josh	Not in Villa														Jess	Amber	Eliminated	Dumped (Day 44)			
Leah	Not in Villa			Tyrique	Safe	Vulnerable	Mitchel	Jess & Sammy; Mehdi & Whitney; Least compatible	Montel		Safe	Montel	Montel	Eliminated	Dumped (Day 38)						
Montel	Not in Villa								Leah		Safe	Leah	Leah	Eliminated	Dumped (Day 38)						
Catherine	André	Zachariah	Zachariah	André	Safe	Vulnerable	Scott	Jess & Sammy; Leah & Mitchel; Least compatible	Scott		Safe	Elom	Elom	Eliminated	Dumped (Day 38)						
Elom	Not in Villa											Catherine	Catherine	Eliminated	Dumped (Day 38)						
Benjamin	Not in Villa											Single	Dumped (Day 31)								
Danielle	Not in Villa											Single	Dumped (Day 31)								
Gabby	Not in Villa											Single	Dumped (Day 31)								
Kodie	Not in Villa											Single	Dumped (Day 31)								
Tink	Not in Villa											Single	Dumped (Day 31)								
Zachary	Not in Villa											Single	Dumped (Day 31)								
Mal	Not in Villa								Sammy		Eliminated	Dumped (Day 23)									
Mehdi	Ruchee		Whitney	Whitney	Safe	Safe	Whitney	Jess & Sammy; Leah & Mitchel; Least compatible	Whitney		Eliminated	Dumped (Day 23)									
André	Catherine	Single	Ruchee	Catherine	Safe	Vulnerable	Dumped (Day 12)														
Charlotte	Not in Villa			Zachariah	Safe	Vulnerable	Dumped (Day 12)														
Ruchee	Mehdi		André	Single	Vulnerable	Dumped (Day 9)															
George	Jess		Single	Dumped (Day 5)																	
Dumped	No; Dumping		George; Failed to couple up	No; Dumping	Ruchee; Islanders' choice to dump	André; Girls' choice to dump	No; Dumping			Molly; Failed to couple up	Mal, Mehdi; Public's choice to dump	Benjamin, Danielle, Gabby, Kodie, Tink, Zachary; Failed to couple up	No; Dumping	Catherine & Elom, Leah & Montel; Public's choice to dump	No; Dumping		Amber & Josh; Public's choice to dump	Abi & Scott; Islanders' choice to dump	Ella B & Mitchel; Public's choice to dump		Molly & Zachariah; 14.37% to win
Dumped	No; Dumping		George; Failed to couple up	No; Dumping	Ruchee; Islanders' choice to dump	André; Girls' choice to dump	No; Dumping			Molly; Failed to couple up	Mal, Mehdi; Public's choice to dump	Benjamin, Danielle, Gabby, Kodie, Tink, Zachary; Failed to couple up	No; Dumping	Catherine & Elom, Leah & Montel; Public's choice to dump	No; Dumping		Amber & Josh; Public's choice to dump	Abi & Scott; Islanders' choice to dump	Ella B & Mitchel; Public's choice to dump		Ella T & Tyrique; 24.21% to win
Dumped	No; Dumping		George; Failed to couple up	No; Dumping	Ruchee; Islanders' choice to dump	Charlotte; Boys' choice to dump	No; Dumping			Molly; Failed to couple up	Mal, Mehdi; Public's choice to dump	Benjamin, Danielle, Gabby, Kodie, Tink, Zachary; Failed to couple up	No; Dumping	Catherine & Elom, Leah & Montel; Public's choice to dump	No; Dumping		Kady & Ouzy; Lochan & Whitney's choice to dump	Abi & Scott; Islanders' choice to dump	Ella B & Mitchel; Public's choice to dump		Lochan & Whitney; 26.85% to win
Dumped	No; Dumping		George; Failed to couple up	No; Dumping	Ruchee; Islanders' choice to dump	Charlotte; Boys' choice to dump	No; Dumping			Molly; Failed to couple up	Mal, Mehdi; Public's choice to dump	Benjamin, Danielle, Gabby, Kodie, Tink, Zachary; Failed to couple up	No; Dumping	Catherine & Elom, Leah & Montel; Public's choice to dump	No; Dumping		Kady & Ouzy; Lochan & Whitney's choice to dump	Abi & Scott; Islanders' choice to dump	Ella B & Mitchel; Public's choice to dump		Jess & Sammy; 34.57% to win

== Weekly summary ==
The main events in the Love Island villa are summarised in the table below.

Week 1	Entrances	On Day 1, André, Catherine, Ella T, Jess, George, Mehdi, Mitchel, Molly, Ruchee, Tyrique and Zachariah entered the villa.; On Day 3, Whitney entered the villa.; On Day 4, Sammy entered the villa.
Week 1	Coupling	On Day 1, following a public vote to decide the first couples of the series, André was paired with Catherine, George coupled up with Jess, Mehdi was chosen to be with Ruchee, Mitchel with Molly, and Tyrique was picked to couple up with Ella T.; On Day 2, Zachariah, who entered after the coupling, had to steal one girl for himself. He chose Catherine, leaving André single.; On Day 5, the islanders recoupled for the first time with the girls picking which boy they'd like to be with. Catherine and Zachariah, Ella T and Tyrique, and Molly and Mitchel remained together, meanwhile Jess chose Sammy, Ruchee coupled up with André, and Whitney went with Mehdi. As George was the only boy not picked he was dumped from the island.
Week 1	Challenges	On Day 2, the girls and the boys competed against each other in "Wary Tales", in which they had to guess which islander a fact was about. To make their guess they had kiss the islander they believe is the answer.
Week 1	Dates	On Day 2, after Zachariah chose to steal Catherine, they had a date on the terrace.; On Day 3, new islander Whitney had to pick an islander to take on a date. She chose André.; On Day 4, new islander Sammy had to choose three girls to take on a date in the hideaway. He chose Ella T, Molly and Jess respectively.
Week 1	Exits	On Day 5, George was dumped from the island after failing to couple up.
Week 2	Entrances	On Day 8, Charlotte and Leah entered the villa.; On Day 11, Scott entered the villa.
Week 2	Coupling	On Day 9, the islanders recoupled again with the boys picking which girl they'd like to be with. However, as new islanders, both Charlotte and Leah were given first choice. Charlotte picked Zachariah, whilst Leah coupled up with Tyrique. As well as this, Mehdi and Whitney, Mitchel and Molly, and Sammy and Jess remained together, meanwhile André chose Catherine. As Ella T and Ruchee were not picked, they became single and vulnerable.
Week 2	Challenges	On Day 7, the boys took part in "Absolute Bankers" where they had to strip, collect as many bank notes as possible, then buy a gift for the girl of their choice. The girls declared André as the winner of the challenge.; On Day 11, the girls took part in "She's a Keeper" where they had to show off their football skills before giving a boy of their choice a red card. They then had to defend penalty kicks against the boys, then reward their star player with a kiss.
Week 2	Dates	On Day 8, new Islanders Charlotte and Leah were asked to choose three other islanders to take on dates with each of them preparing a starter, a main course and a dessert. Both picked Mitch, Tyrique and Zachariah.; On Day 9, Mehdi and Whitney left the villa to go on a date.
Week 2	Exits	On Day 9, after failing to couple up, Ella T and Ruchee became vulnerable of being dumped. It was then up to the remaining islanders to decide which of the two girls to save. They saved Ella T, which ultimately sent Ruchee home.; On Day 12, after receiving the fewest public votes, Catherine, Charlotte and Leah, and André, Sammy and Zachariah were in danger of being dumped. The remaining islanders then had to choose one boy and one girl to dump from the island. The girls chose André, and the boys chose Charlotte.
Week 3	Entrances	On Day 16, Mal and Montel entered the villa.; On Day 19, Kady entered the villa.
Week 3	Coupling	On Day 14, the islanders recoupled again with the boys picking which girl they'd like to be with. Mehdi and Whitney, and Sammy and Jess remained together, meanwhile Mitchel chose Leah, Scott coupled up with Catherine, Zachariah went with Molly, and Tyrique got back together with Ella T.; On Day 16, the islanders voted for their least compatible couples. As Jess and Sammy, and Leah and Mitchel received the most votes, they were all now single and unable to recouple together at the next recoupling.; On Day 18, the islanders recoupled with the girls picking which boy they'd like to couple up. Following a previous twist, Jess and Sammy, and Leah and Mitchel were banned from coupling up together. As new islanders, both Mal and Montel were given first choice. Mal chose Sammy, whilst Montel coupled up with Leah. As well as this, Catherine and Scott, Ella T and Tyrique, Molly and Zachariah, and Whitney and Medhdi remained together. Jess also chose to couple up with Mitchel.; On Day 19, new islander Kady was able to couple up with a boy of her choice. She picked Zachariah, which ultimately left Molly single and dumped.
Week 3	Challenges	On Day 15, the islanders took part in "Situationship". Hosted by Mitchel and Leah, the other couples answered a series of questions in which they had to match their partner's answer in order to progress further in the game.
Week 3	Dates	On Day 16, new islanders Mal and Montel each dated the newly single islanders who were split during a least compatibility vote. Mal dated Mitchel and Sammy, whereas Montel went on dates with Jess and Leah.; On Day 18, Molly and Zachariah left the villa to go on their first date.
Week 3	Exits	On Day 19, new islander Kady was able to couple up with a boy of her choice. She picked Zachariah, which ultimately left Molly single and dumped.
Week 4	Entrances	On Day 26, Benjamin, Elom, Kodie, Lochan, Ouzy and Zachary entered Casa Amor.
Week 4	Challenges	On Day 21, the boys and girls went head-to-head to raise their opposing team's heart rate. At the end of the game they found out who raised their heart rate the most.; On Day 23, the girls competed in a snogging challenge. The girls kissed each boy in turn whilst the boys were blindfolded and gave them a score out of ten.
Week 4	Dates	On Day 22, Ella T and Tyrique left the villa to go on their first date.; On Day 25, single islanders Sammy and Whitney were each able to pick another islander to take on a date. Sammy picked Jess, whilst Whitney chose Zachariah.
Week 4	Exits	On Day 23, after receiving the fewest public votes for favourite girl and favourite boy, both Mal and Mehdi were dumped from the island.
Week 5	Entrances	On Day 27, Abi, Amber, Danielle, Gabby and Tink entered the villa. Molly also re-entered the villa as part of a Casa Amor twist.
Week 5	Coupling	On Day 31, the original Islanders were told that they would be re-coupling. They were only given the option to remain in their current couple or to choose one of the new Islanders. However, as the boys and the girls were living in separate villas, they were not aware of what the other one chose. If one decided to re-couple and the other did not, then they would be single but still remain on the island. If both re-coupled then they would both remain in the villa with their new partner, and any remaining single new islanders would be dumped. Leah and Montel remained together, meanwhile Catherine coupled up with Elom, Ella T went with Ouzy, Mitchel picked Abi, Sammy chose Amber, Whitney opted with Lochan, and Zachariah reunited with Molly following her return. As Jess, Kady, Scott and Tyrique's original partners failed to couple with them, they remained single. The new single islanders were then dumped from the villa.
Week 5	Challenges	On Day 27, the Main Villa and Casa Amor competed in "Raunchy Races" where they had to complete a certain task quicker than the other villa. The game was won by the Main Villa, therefore they won a party for that evening.
Week 5	Exits	On Day 31, new islanders Benjamin, Danielle, Gabby, Kodie, Tink and Zachary were dumped from the island after failing to couple up.
Week 6	Entrances	On Day 39, Ella B and Josh entered the villa.
Week 6	Coupling	On Day 36, the islanders recoupled with the boys picking which girl they would like to couple up. Zachariah and Molly, Elom and Catherine, Lochan and Whitney, Montel and Leah, and Mitchel and Abi all remained together. Tyrique and Ella T, and Sammy and Jess got back together, whereas Ouzy chose Kady, and Scott opted for Amber.; On Day 39, new islanders Ella B and Josh were able to steal a boy and girl of their choice. Ella B chose Mitchel, whilst Josh picked Jess, which resulted in Abi and Sammy becoming single.
Week 6	Challenges	On Day 35, the Islanders took part in "Mad Movies" in a Boys vs Girls pub quiz challenge where they had to answer sex related questions. The team who answered correctly were able to select a movie from the list which featured a clip of another Islander.
Week 6	Dates	On Day 35, Abi and Mitchel left the villa to go on their date.; On Day 38, Lochan and Whitney left the villa to go on their first date.
Week 6	Exits	On Day 38, after receiving the fewest public votes for least compatible couple, Catherine and Elom, and Leah and Montel were dumped from the island.
Week 7	Coupling	On Day 42, the islanders recoupled with the girls picking which boys they would like to couple up. Ella T and Tyrique, Kady and Ouzy, Molly and Zachariah, Whitney and Lochan all remained together. Jess and Sammy got back together, whereas Abi chose Scott, and Amber opted for Josh, and Ella B went for Mitchel.
Week 7	Challenges	On Day 43, the islanders competed in the "Snog, Marry, Pie" challenge where each islander had to snog, marry and pie an islander of the opposite gender.; On Day 46, the couples took part in "Couple Goals", where they were given a series of questions and had to write down another couple they believe the question most applies to, before revealing their answers to the group.
Week 7	Exits	On Day 44, following a public vote for the viewer's favourite couple, Amber and Josh, Ella B and Mitchel, and Kady and Ouzy were all in danger of being dumped from the island. Amber and Josh were immediately dumped having received the fewest votes, leaving Ella B and Mitchel, and Kady and Ouzy still at risk. It was then down to Lochan and Whitney, who had received the most public votes, to pick a couple to save. They chose Ella B and Mitchel, which left Kady and Ouzy dumped.
Week 8	Challenges	On Day 50, the islanders took part in a talent contest.
Week 8	Dates	On Day 53, Ella B and Mitchel, Molly and Zachariah, and Ella T and Tyrique went on their final dates.; On Day 54, Whitney and Lochan, and Jess and Sammy went on their final dates.
Week 8	Exits	On Day 52, following a public vote for the most compatible couple, Abi and Scott, Ella B and Mitchel, and Molly and Zachariah were all in danger of being dumped from the island. It was then up to the remaining islanders to choose who to dump. They picked Abi and Scott.
Week 9	Challenges	On Day 56, the islanders split into two teams and competed against each other in a number of sports day events.
Week 9	Exits	On Day 56, following the islanders votes for their least compatible couple, Ella B and Mitchel, and Whitney and Lochan, who all received votes went head-to-head with each other in a public vote. It was then revealed that having received the fewest public votes, Ella B and Mitchel had been dumped.; On Day 58, Molly and Zachariah finished in fourth place and Ella T and Tyrique finished third. Jess and Sammy were then voted the winners, leaving Whitney and Lochan as runners-up.

== Ratings ==
Official ratings are taken from BARB. Because the Saturday episodes are "Unseen Bits" episodes rather than nightly highlights, these are not included in the overall averages. Viewing figures are consolidated 7-day viewing figures with pre-broadcast viewing and viewing on tablets, PCs and smartphones included. Figures marked N/A were not included in the top 50 weekly ratings.

	Viewers (millions)								
	Week 1	Week 2	Week 3	Week 4	Week 5	Week 6	Week 7	Week 8	Week 9
Sunday		N/A	2.57	2.43	2.76	2.47	2.55	N/A	N/A
Monday	3.02	2.26	N/A	2.43	2.64	2.52	2.68	2.54	N/A
Tuesday	2.51	2.25	2.30	2.37	2.34	N/A	2.54	2.59	
Wednesday	2.40	N/A	N/A	N/A	2.73	N/A	N/A	N/A	
Thursday	2.42	2.32	N/A	2.37	2.56	2.39	2.50	N/A	
Friday	N/A	N/A	2.35	N/A	2.38	2.58	2.61	N/A	
Series average	N/A								
