= Ben Hanlin =

English magician and presenter (born 1986)

- Born: Benjamin Scott Hanlin; 26 March 1986 (age 38); Birmingham, England
- Education: Warwick School, Warwickshire
- Alma mater: University of Reading
- Occupations: Magician; presenter
- Years active: 2012–present
- Spouse: Briony Hanlin
- Children: 2
- Website: Official website

Benjamin Scott Hanlin (born 26 March 1986) is an English magician and presenter, known for presenting the ITV2 series Tricked from 2013 to 2016. In 2020, Hanlin competed in the twelfth series of Dancing on Ice, where he finished in fourth place.

== Education ==
Hanlin was educated at Warwick School, a boarding and day private school in the market town of Warwick, in Warwickshire, followed by the University of Reading.

== Career ==
Hanlin presented a series called Breaking Magic for the Discovery Channel, as well as being a continuity presenter for CBBC. From 2013 to 2016, Hanlin presented three series of Tricked on ITV2. In January 2016, Hanlin joined Capital Birmingham hosting a Saturday afternoon show, which was later cancelled. However, he still covers Capital Breakfast on Capital Birmingham.

In January 2020, Hanlin began competing in the twelfth series of Dancing on Ice. On 1 March 2020, he finished in fourth place, alongside professional partner Carlotta Edwards.
