= Chris Ramsay =

German–Canadian magician and YouTuber

- Occupations: Magician; puzzler; UFO/UAP/Extraterrestrial beings researcher and communicator

YouTube information
- Channels: Chris Ramsay; Area52
- Years active: 2011–present
- Genres: Magic; puzzle solving; Extraterrestrial life
- Subscribers: 7.09 million
- Views: 1.79 billion
- Last updated: 21 February 2026
- Website: chris-ramsay.com

Chris Ramsay - professional puzzle solver and magic Olympian

Chris Ramsay is a Canadian magician, television producer who created and starred in the TruTV stunt magic show Big Trick Energy and currently a UFO/UAP and extraterrestrial life researcher and communicator. His YouTube channel, featuring puzzle solves, cardistry and magic has over 7 million subscribers. He is one of the subjects of a book by Ian Frisch, Magic Is Dead: My Journey into the World's Most Secretive Society of Magicians (2019). In May 2020, he was discussed in an article by The New Yorker which showed one of his puzzle-solving videos and included his work among diversions that "offer the rare sensation of absolute focus and the joy of accomplishment".

In December 2020, he was interviewed for Kind Magazine.

He appeared in the 2021 film Spiral in the role of Speez, and some of his scenes were shown in 21 Savage's music video for his song Spiral.

Besides his magician career-related YouTube channel, Ramsay also has a YouTube channel "Area52" dedicated to investigations of UAP and anomalous experiences (with over 590.000 subscribers as of Oct 2, 2026).
