= Matilda Draper =

English television personality (born 2000)

- Born: Matilda-June Draper; 26 May 2000 (age 25); Beckenham, Bromley, England
- Occupation: Television personality
- Years active: 2024–present

Matilda-June Draper (born 26 May 2000) is an English television personality. She rose to prominence after appearing on the eleventh series of the ITV2 dating series Love Island, reaching the final alongside Sean Stone. She subsequently appeared on the ITV2 reality series The Only Way Is Essex.

== Life and career ==
Matilda-June Draper was born on 26 May 2000 in Beckenham, Bromley. She is a Christian. Prior to appearing on television, she worked as a recruitment consultant.

In 2024, she became a contestant on the eleventh series of the ITV2 dating series Love Island, entering as a "bombshell" on Day 17. She reached the final alongside Sean Stone, where the couple finished in third place.

Following her appearance on Love Island, Draper began dating Roman Hackett, who was appearing as a cast member on the ITV2 reality series The Only Way Is Essex at the time. During their relationship, she starred on the programme alongside Hackett, appearing in the thirty-fourth and thirty-fifth series in 2025. The pair were baptised together as part of their scenes for the series. She departed from the cast of the series following the end of her relationship with Hackett.

== Filmography ==
As herself
Year	Title	Notes	Ref.
2024	Love Island	Finalist; series 11	
2025	The Only Way Is Essex	Main cast	
