= Whitney Adebayo =

English television personality (born 1997)

- Born: Whitney Adeshola Adebayo; 20 November 1997 (age 28); Camden Town, Camden, England
- Education: University of Hertfordshire
- Occupations: Television personality; businessowner
- Television: Love Island

Whitney Adeshola Adebayo (born 20 November 1997) is a British television personality and businessowner. After setting up a wig business in Camden Town, she was cast on the tenth series of the ITV2 dating series Love Island. She reached the final alongside partner Lochan Nowacki, where they finished in second place. She competed in the second series of the Netflix reality series Inside, finishing in seventh place.

== Life and career ==
Whitney Adeshola Adebayo was born in November 1997 in Camden Town, in North West London. She is of Nigerian descent. She studied at the University of Hertfordshire between 2016 and 2020, obtaining a 2:1 BSc in internet technology and multimedia. She then became an entrepreneur and owns a wig business. She set up the business, CC Hair, whilst studying in her second year at university. The name stands for Candy Corner.

In June 2023, she was announced as a "bombshell" cast member for the tenth series of the ITV2 dating series Love Island. She entered on the third day of the series. In the series, she coupled up with Lochan Nowacki, The pair reached the final and became the bookies favourite to win, but finished in second place. In March 2025, she began competing in the second series of the Netflix reality series Inside.

== Filmography ==
As herself
Year	Title	Role	Notes	Ref.
2023	Love Island	Contestant	Series 10 runner-up	
2025	Inside	Contestant	Series 2, 7th place	
2026	Love Island All Stars	Contestant	Series 3	
