= Love Island (2015 TV series) series 2 =

2016 series of Love Island

Love Island
- Series 2
- Presented by: Caroline Flack
- No. of days: 45
- No. of contestants: 26
- Winners: Cara De La Hoyde; Nathan Massey
- Runners-up: Alex Bowen; Olivia Buckland
- No. of episodes: 37

Release
- Original network: ITV2
- Original release: 30 May – 11 July 2016

Series chronology
- ← Previous; Series 1 Next → Series 3

The second series of Love Island began on 30 May 2016 hosted by Caroline Flack on ITV2, and ended on 11 July 2016. It's the second from the revived series, but fourth overall. The series was narrated by Iain Stirling. The series was extended to air every night of the week, as opposed to the previous series where it only aired six nights. However the Saturday episode was used as a weekly catch-up entitled Love Island: The Weekly Hot List rather than a nightly highlights episode. The average viewers for this series was 1,470,000, up 900,000 on the first series.

The series included the first time an Islander was removed from the villa, as Malia Arkian was removed just hours after she entered the villa following an altercation with Kady McDermott. It also featured a number of voluntarily exits from the series, as Rykard Jenkins decided to leave the villa after his new love interest Rachel Fenton was eliminated. Zara Holland also decided to leave after discovering her mum is in the hospital and she was stripped of her title Miss Great Britain. Sophie Gradon also decided to voluntarily leave the villa. Sophie was a former Miss Great Britain. Sophie and Katie Salmon were also the first same-sex couple to feature in Love Island.

On 11 July 2016, the series was won by Cara De La Hoyde and Nathan Massey, with Alex Bowen and Olivia Buckland as runners-up.

== Production ==
On Valentine's Day, 14 February 2016, it was confirmed that Love Island would return for a second series due to air later in the year. On 18 May 2016 it was confirmed that the series would begin on 30 May 2016, but had scrapped the live eliminations. A one-minute trailer for the series aired on 23 May 2016. Pictures of the villa were unveiled on 28 May 2016. The villa is located in Mallorca with 69 cameras watching the Islanders' every move. It only includes double beds forcing them to share with each other, but has a special Hideaway bedroom for couples to spend the night away from the others.

== Islanders ==
The Islanders for the second series were revealed on 24 May 2016, just a week before the launch. However, throughout the series, more Islanders entered the villa to find love. Some Islanders were dumped from the island for either failing to couple up, some were voted off by their fellow Islanders, and others for receiving the fewest votes in public eliminations. The series was won by Cara and Nathan on 11 July 2016 having received 54% of the vote.

Islander	Age	Hometown	Entered	Exited	Status	Ref
Cara De La Hoyde	26	Kent	Day 1	Day 45	Winner	
Nathan Massey	25	Essex	Day 1	Day 45	Winner	
Alex Bowen	24	Wolverhampton	Day 18	Day 45	Runner-up	
Olivia Buckland	22	Chelmsford	Day 1	Day 45	Runner-up	
Kady McDermott	20	Stevenage	Day 3	Day 45	Third place	
Scott Thomas	27	Manchester	Day 1	Day 45	Third place	
Adam Maxted	24	Belfast	Day 11	Day 45	Fourth place	
Katie Salmon	20	The Wirral	Day 34	Day 45	Fourth place	
Emma Jane Woodham	19	Oxford	Day 27	Day 41	Dumped	
Terry Walsh	28	Surrey	Day 3	Day 41	Dumped	
Adam Jukes	23	Manchester	Day 34	Day 41	Dumped	
Lauren Whiteside	25	Blackpool	Day 37	Day 41	Dumped	
Tina Stinnes	21	London	Day 20	Day 40	Dumped	
Sophie Gradon	30	Newcastle	Day 1	Day 39	Walked	
Troy Frith	23	Kent	Day 30	Day 37	Dumped	
Tom Powell	24	Port Talbot	Day 1	Day 33	Dumped	
Liana Isadora Van Riel	20	Exeter	Day 20	Day 33	Dumped	
Oliver Maxwell Fernandez	25	Hertfordshire	Day 30	Day 31	Dumped	
Malin Andersson	23	Milton Keynes	Day 1	Day 25	Dumped	
Zara Holland	20	Hull	Day 1	Day 22	Walked	
James Khan	20	Teddington	Day 18	Day 20	Dumped	
Rykard Jenkins	25	Kent	Day 1	Day 15	Walked	
Daniel Lukakis	23	London	Day 1	Day 15	Dumped	
Rachel Fenton	23	Hampshire	Day 7	Day 15	Dumped	
Malia Arkian	26	Manchester	Day 7	Day 7	Removed	
Javi Shephard	27	York	Day 1	Day 6	Dumped	

=== Future appearances ===
In 2023, Kady McDermott returned as a bombshell on series 10.

In 2024, Adam Maxted appeared on series one of Love Island: All Stars.

In 2025, Tina Stinnes and Scott Thomas returned for series two of Love Island: All Stars.

== Coupling and elimination history ==
The couples were chosen shortly after the contestants entered the villa. After all of the girls entered, the boys were asked to choose a girl to pair up with. Sophie was paired with Tom, Cara with Nathan, Malin and Rykard paired up, Zara and Scott coupled up, whilst Olivia paired up with Daniel and Javi remained single. However, throughout the series the couples swapped and changed.

	Week 1		Week 2	Week 3		Week 4	Week 5			Week 6			Final	
	Day 1	Day 6	Day 13	Day 15	Day 20	Day 25	Day 31	Day 32	Day 33	Day 37	Day 40	Day 41	Final	
Cara	Nathan	Nathan	Nathan	Safe	Nathan	Safe	Oliver to dump	Nathan	Safe	Nathan	Nathan	Finalist	Split the £50k	Winner (Day 45)
Nathan	Cara	Cara	Cara	Safe	Cara	Immune	Immune	Cara	Safe	Cara	Cara	Finalist	Winner (Day 45)	
Alex	Not in Villa				Olivia	Immune	Immune	Olivia	Safe	Olivia	Olivia	Finalist	Runner-up (Day 45)	
Olivia	Daniel	Rykard	Adam M	Immune	Alex	Safe	Oliver to dump	Alex	Safe	Alex	Alex	Finalist	Runner-up (Day 45)	
Kady	Not in Villa	Scott	Scott	Safe	Scott	Safe	Oliver to dump	Scott	Safe	Scott	Scott	Finalist	Third place (Day 45)	
Scott	Zara	Kady	Kady	Safe	Kady	Immune	Immune	Kady	Safe	Kady	Kady	Finalist	Third place (Day 45)	
Adam M	Not in Villa		Olivia	Immune	Zara	Immune	Immune	Liana	Vulnerable	Tina	Katie	Finalist	Fourth place (Day 45)	
Katie	Not in Villa									Sophie	Adam M	Finalist	Fourth place (Day 45)	
Adam J	Not in Villa									Lauren		Eliminated	Dumped (Day 41)	
Lauren	Not in Villa									Adam J		Eliminated	Dumped (Day 41)	
Emma	Not in Villa						Oliver to dump	Terry	Safe	Terry	Terry	Eliminated	Dumped (Day 41)	
Terry	Not in Villa	Malin	Malin	Safe	Malin	Immune	Immune	Emma	Safe	Emma	Emma	Eliminated	Dumped (Day 41)	
Tina	Not in Villa					Vulnerable	Oliver to dump	Troy	Immune	Adam M	Single	Dumped (Day 40)		
Sophie	Tom	Tom	Tom	Safe	Tom	Safe	Oliver to dump	Tom	Vulnerable	Katie	Walked (Day 39)			
Troy	Not in Villa						Vulnerable	Tina	Immune	Single	Dumped (Day 37)			
Liana	Not in Villa					Vulnerable	Oliver to dump	Adam M	Eliminated	Dumped (Day 33)				
Tom	Sophie	Sophie	Sophie	Safe	Sophie	Immune	Immune	Sophie	Eliminated	Dumped (Day 33)				
Oliver	Not in Villa						Vulnerable	Dumped (Day 31)						
Malin	Rykard	Terry	Terry	Safe	Terry	Eliminated	Dumped (Day 25)							
Zara	Scott	Daniel	Daniel	Vulnerable	Adam M	Walked (Day 22)								
James	Not in Villa				Single	Dumped (Day 20)								
Rykard	Malin	Olivia	Rachel	Vulnerable	Walked (Day 15)									
Daniel	Olivia	Zara	Zara	Vulnerable	Dumped (Day 15)									
Rachel	Not in Villa		Rykard	Vulnerable	Dumped (Day 15)									
Malia	Not in Villa		Removed (Day 7)											
Javi	Single		Dumped (Day 6)											
Notes	none			1	none	2	3	none	4	none		5	6	
Removed	none		Malia	none										
Walked	none			Rykard	none	Zara	none				Sophie	none		
Dumped	No; Dumping	Javi; Failed to couple up	No; Dumping	Daniel, Rachel; Islanders' choice to dump	James; Failed to couple up	Malin; Public's choice to dump	Oliver; 7 of 7 votes to dump	No; Dumping	Liana, Tom; Public’s choice to dump	Troy; Failed to couple up	Tina; Failed to couple up	Adam J & Lauren, Emma & Terry; Public’s choice to dump	Adam M & Katie; Fewest votes to win	
Dumped	No; Dumping	Javi; Failed to couple up	No; Dumping	Daniel, Rachel; Islanders' choice to dump	James; Failed to couple up	Malin; Public's choice to dump	Oliver; 7 of 7 votes to dump	No; Dumping	Liana, Tom; Public’s choice to dump	Troy; Failed to couple up	Tina; Failed to couple up	Adam J & Lauren, Emma & Terry; Public’s choice to dump	Kady & Scott; Third–most votes to win	
Dumped	No; Dumping	Javi; Failed to couple up	No; Dumping	Daniel, Rachel; Islanders' choice to dump	James; Failed to couple up	Malin; Public's choice to dump	Oliver; 7 of 7 votes to dump	No; Dumping	Liana, Tom; Public’s choice to dump	Troy; Failed to couple up	Tina; Failed to couple up	Adam J & Lauren, Emma & Terry; Public’s choice to dump	Alex & Olivia; Second–most votes to win	
Dumped	No; Dumping	Javi; Failed to couple up	No; Dumping	Daniel, Rachel; Islanders' choice to dump	James; Failed to couple up	Malin; Public's choice to dump	Oliver; 7 of 7 votes to dump	No; Dumping	Liana, Tom; Public’s choice to dump	Troy; Failed to couple up	Tina; Failed to couple up	Adam J & Lauren, Emma & Terry; Public’s choice to dump	Cara & Nathan; Most votes to win	

=== Notes ===
- ^Note 1: On Day 15, the public voted for which couples they think is the 'perfect couple'. The couples with the fewest votes would be vulnerable and at risk of being dumped from the villa. The safe islanders then have to choose one member of each of the bottom two couples to be dumped from the island.
- ^Note 2: The public voted for their favourite girl islanders. The islanders with the fewest votes would be vulnerable and at risk of leaving the villa. Malin received fewest votes and was dumped from the island.
- ^Note 3: On Day 31, the girl islanders had to choose one of the new bombshells to dump. Oliver received the most votes and was dumped from the island.
- ^Note 4: The islanders voted who they thought were the weakest couples. The two couples with the most votes were vulnerable. The public then voted for which member of each vulnerable couple they wanted to be dumped from the island. As the newest couple, Troy and Tina were immune.
- ^Note 5: On Day 41, the public voted for which couples they wanted to save. The two couple who received the fewest votes, Adam J and Lauren and Emma and Terry, was dumped from the island.
- ^Note 6: The public voted for which couple they think should win Love Island. The couple with the most votes were declared the winners of Love Island and received the grand prize money.

== Weekly summary ==
The main events in the Love Island villa are summarised in the table below.

Week 1	Entrances	On Day 1, Cara, Daniel, Javi, Malin, Nathan, Olivia, Rykard, Scott, Sophie, Tom and Zara entered the villa.; On Day 3, Kady and Terry entered the villa.
Week 1	Coupling	On Day 1, the Islanders coupled up for the first time. After all of the girls entered, the boys were asked to choose a girl to pair up with. Sophie was paired with Tom, Cara with Nathan, Malin and Rykard paired up, Zara and Scott coupled up, whilst Olivia paired up with Daniel and Javi remained single.; On Day 6, the Islanders re-coupled. This time it was the girls who had to pick a boy to pair up with. Cara and Nathan, and Sophie and Tom were the only couples to remain together, whilst Olivia picked Rykard, Kady went with Scott, Malin chose Terry, and Zara coupled up with Daniel. As Javi remained single he was dumped from the island.
Week 1	Challenges	On Day 2, the boys went up against the girls in a game of Beer pong with a twist. A secret about an Islander was in each cup, and if the ball landed in the cup, the Islander who threw the ball would have to guess who the secret is about. To lock in their answer they had to kiss that chosen Islander.; On Day 6, the boys competed in "Love Island's Strongest Man", where they took part in a number of physical activities in order to prove their strength. At the end of the competition Daniel was announced as the winner.
Week 1	Dates	On Day 3, Cara and Nathan left the villa to go on their first date.; On Day 4, Javi was asked to choose one of the girls to go on a date with him. He chose Kady.; On Day 5, Terry had to choose two girls to cook him dinner then date separately. He chose Malin and Olivia, whilst Kady had to choose two boys to do the same. She chose Daniel and Scott.
Week 1	Exits	On Day 6, Javi was eliminated after failing to couple up.
Week 2	Entrances	On Day 7, Malia and Rachel entered the villa.; On Day 11, Adam M entered the villa.
Week 2	Coupling	On Day 13, the Islanders re-coupled once again. They were told that whoever new Islander Adam M coupled up with would be safe from the next elimination. Nathan and Cara, Scott and Kady, Terry and Malin, Tom and Sophie, Zara and Daniel remained coupled together, whilst Rykard picked Rachel, and Adam M chose Olivia.
Week 2	Challenges	On Day 7, Tom and Sophie hosted "A Trifling Matter" where the other couples competed to pass trifle ingredients from one bowl to another by passing with their mouths only. Olivia and Rykard won this challenge.; On Day 9, the boys competed against each other to sweat the most after doing physical exercise, then place their sweaty clothes into a bag. The girls then had to judge the scent of the boys without knowing which bag belonged to who, and then choose the most attractive scent. As most of the girls chose Rykard, he won the challenge.; On Day 11, Rachel hosted as the Islanders took part in "Size Matters" where the girls had to use clay to make models of their partner's penis. The boys then had to make models of their own penis. The couple with the most similar models won the challenge. This was Tom and Sophie.
Week 2	Dates	On Day 7, Scott left the villa to go on a date with new Islander Malia, whilst Daniel left to date new Islander Rachel.; On Day 9, Daniel and Zara left the villa to go on a date feeding ostriches.; On Day 9, after winning a challenge, Rykard chose to spend the night with Rachel in the Hideaway.; On Day 10, the girls speed dated four potential new Islanders.; On Day 12, as the new Islander, Adam M was given the opportunity to take three girls out of the villa and date them separately. He chose Olivia, Sophie and Zara.
Week 2	Exits	On Day 7, Malia was removed from the villa following an altercation with Kady.
Week 3	Entrances	On Day 18, Alex and James entered the villa.; On Day 20, Liana and Tina entered the villa.
Week 3	Coupling	On Day 20, the Islanders re-coupled again, where the girls chose the boy they wanted to be in a couple with. Cara and Nathan, Kady and Scott, Malin and Terry, and Sophie and Tom remained together, whilst Zara chose Adam M, and Olivia picked Alex. As James remained single, he was dumped from the island.
Week 3	Challenges	On Day 16, the Islanders had to do dares that they randomly picked from a cup.; On Day 17, the Islanders were tested on how well they knew their other half. As the only single girl, Zara hosted the quiz. Tom and Sophie were announced as the winners of this challenge, and were rewarded with a video call home.; On Day 18, Alex and James rated the other Islanders from most to least in a number of categories. The Islanders had to guess what Alex and James voted.; On Day 19, the girls went head-to-head against each other in a pool of gunge. To win the game they had to be the first one to take the socks from their opponent. As Olivia was the fastest winner, she won the challenge overall.
Week 3	Dates	On Day 17, the public voted Malin and Terry to go on a date.; On Day 18, the public voted Zara to date one of the new Islanders. She then chose Alex to spend the night in the Hideaway with her.; On Day 19, new Islanders Alex and James were asked to choose one girl each to take on a date. Alex chose Olivia, and James chose Kady.
Week 3	Exits	On Day 15, after receiving the fewest public votes, Daniel and Zara, and Rykard and Rachel were in danger of leaving. The remaining couples had to choose one member of each couple to dump from the island. They chose Daniel and Rachel.; On Day 15, following Rachel's elimination, Rykard decided to leave the villa.; On Day 20, James was eliminated after failing to couple up.
Week 4	Entrances	On Day 27, Emma entered the villa.
Week 4	Coupling	On Day 21, Liana and Tina were asked to put two coupled on a break, and couple up with that boy for the night. Liana chose Alex and Olivia, whilst Tina chose Scott and Kady.
Week 4	Challenges	On Day 21, new Islanders Liana and Tina were asked to put two couples on a break and separate them for the night. They chose Alex and Olivia, and Kady and Scott. As a result, Scott became coupled up with Tina for the night, and Liana was coupled with Alex.; On Day 24, the boys had to revise on a subject to do with love, with the girls testing them afterwards. Scott was the winner of the quiz, and was rewarded with a video call home.; On Day 24, the girls took part in a "Miss Love Island 2016" competition where they each had to show off their talents. The boys chose Sophie as the winner.; On Day 25, the Islanders were given quotes which had been said about them in the villa. The Islanders had to throw a mug of cold tea over the Islander they thought said the quote.; On Day 26, the boys each had to complete an undercover assignment without the girls knowing. They completed their missions and were rewarded with a football and goal posts.; On Day 27, the girls had to attempt to raise their partners heart rate. The girl who raised their boy's heart rate the most would win the challenge. Scott and Kady were the winners.
Week 4	Dates	On Day 23, Tom and Sophie left the villa to go on a date.; On Day 23, Cara and Nathan spent the night in the Hideaway following a date.; On Day 27, Scott and Kady left the villa to go on a shopping date to buy food to cook for their fellow Islanders that night.; On Day 27, Adam M and Terry went on a date with new Islander Emma before she entered the villa.
Week 4	Exits	On Day 22, Zara decided to leave the villa due to a family emergency.; On Day 25, the public voted for their favourite girl in the villa. As Malin received the fewest votes, she was eliminated.
Week 5	Entrances	On Day 30, Oliver and Troy entered the villa, but were instantly told that only one of them would be staying.; On Day 34, Adam J and Katie entered the villa after being chosen by the other Islanders.
Week 5	Coupling	On Day 32, the Islanders re-coupled again, where the boys chose which girls they'd like to couple up with. They were told that Troy and the girl he chose would be immune from the next dumping. Cara and Nathan, Alex and Olivia, Scott and Kady and Sophie and Tom decided to remain together, whilst Terry chose to couple up with Emma, Adam M picked Liana, and Troy chose Tina.
Week 5	Challenges	On Day 30, the Islanders were all blindfolded and had to find their partner. During the task, Oliver and Troy entered the villa to join in.; On Day 32, the girls had to build some flat pack furniture. However it was the boys who had the instructions. The girls had to phone their partner who would explain how to build it over the phone. As Emma and Sophie ditched the boys and built it themselves, they won champagne.; On Day 34, potential new Islanders entered the villa and were put through a number of tests by the original Islanders. The boys chose Katie to stay, whilst the girls chose Adam J to stay.
Week 5	Dates	On Day 29, as a new Islander, Emma was asked to choose one boy to go on a date with. She chose Terry.; On Day 30, as new Islanders, Oliver and Troy were able to take three girls on a date. Oliver chose Kady, Sophie and Tina, whilst Troy chose Liana, Tina and Kady.; On Day 31, for Nathan's birthday, he left the villa to go on a date with Cara.; On Day 32, Troy and Tina left the villa to go on a date.
Week 5	Exits	On Day 31, the girls were asked to choose one of the new Islanders; Oliver and Troy to be dumped from the island. They chose to eliminate Oliver.; On Day 33, Liana and Tom were dumped from the island following the Islander's decision to vote for Tom and Sophie, and Adam M and Liana as the weakest couples. The public then voted to save one Islander from each couple. They saved Sophie and Adam M leaving Liana and Tom eliminated.
Week 6	Entrances	On Day 37, Lauren entered the villa.
Week 6	Coupling	On Day 37, the Islanders re-coupled once again, where the girls had to choose who they wanted to couple up with. Nathan and Cara, Terry and Emma, Scott and Kady, and Alex and Olivia all remained with each other, whilst Tina chose to be with Adam M, and Katie decided to couple up with Sophie. This left Adam J and Troy single. Lauren then entered the villa and was asked to couple up with one of the single boys. She chose Adam J, which caused Troy to be dumped from the island.; On Day 40, due to Sophie's exit from the villa, the Islanders re-coupled for the final time. As Lauren and Adam J were already immune, they were automatically coupled up. Cara and Nathan, Scott and Kady, Terry and Emma, Alex and Olivia all remained together, whilst Adam M chose Katie. This left Tina single who was therefore dumped from the island.
Week 6	Challenges	On Day 36, the couples took part in a quiz hosted by Adam J and Katie. The answers to the questions were either A, B or C and the Islanders had swim to the correct answer in order to score a point. Alex and Olivia were the winners of the quiz.; On Day 38, the Islanders were shown a number of tweets from viewers. They had to then guess who each tweet was about by finding the answer in a pool.; On Day 39, the couples were given a dog for the day to look after.; On Day 40, the boys took a lie detector test with the girls asking the questions.; On Day 40 and 41, the couples had their parenting skills tested by looking after dolls.
Week 6	Dates	On Day 35, as new Islanders, Adam J and Katie were asked to choose three other Islanders to take on dates. Adam J chose Sophie, Olivia and Tina, whilst Katie chose Alex, Adam M and Sophie.; On Day 37, Scott and Terry left the villa to go on a mates date. They were then interrupted by Malin who returned to confront Terry.; On Day 37, having failed to couple up, Adam J and Troy were given a final opportunity to save themselves by dating new Islander Lauren. She then chose which of the two should remain in the villa.; On Day 40, Adam M and Katie left the villa to go on a date.; On Day 41, as a reward for winning the parenting challenge, Cara and Nathan left the villa to go on a date.
Week 6	Exits	On Day 37, Troy was eliminated after failing to couple up.; On Day 39, Sophie decided to leave the villa.; On Day 40, Tina was eliminated after failing to couple up.; On Day 41, Adam J and Lauren, and Emma and Terry were eliminated after receiving the fewest public votes to save.
Week 7
Week 7	Entrances	On Day 42, the Islander's friends and family briefly entered the villa.
Week 7	Challenges	On Day 44, the Islanders were told that they'd be hosting "Love Island Summer Ball". The boys had to learn how to dance to impress the girls, whilst they left the villa to go shopping for dresses.; On Day 45, as winners, Cara and Nathan were given the choice of two envelopes. One containing £50,000 and the other containing nothing. As Cara picked the one with the money in, she was given the choice to keep it for herself of split the money with Nathan. She chose to share.
Week 7	Dates	On Day 43, the Islanders chose Adam M and Katie to spend the night in the Hideaway.
Week 7	Exits	On Day 45, Adam M and Katie left the villa in fourth place, whilst Scott and Kady finished third. Cara and Nathan were then voted the winners, leaving Alex and Olivia as runners-up.

== Ratings ==
Official ratings are taken from BARB and include ITV2 +1. Because the Saturday episodes are weekly catch-up episodes rather than nightly highlights, these are not included in the overall averages.

	Viewers (millions)						
	Week 1	Week 2	Week 3	Week 4	Week 5	Week 6	Week 7
Sunday		1.21	1.36	1.62	1.61	1.60	1.32
Monday	1.23	1.21	1.40	1.54	1.66	1.73	1.69
Tuesday	1.16	1.13	1.36	1.58	1.66	1.80	
Wednesday	1.22	1.48	1.36	1.53	1.54	1.54	
Thursday	1.25	1.34	1.46	1.66	1.66	1.42	
Friday	1.40	1.31	1.55	1.63	1.63	1.47	
Weekly average	1.25	1.28	1.42	1.59	1.63	1.59	1.51
Running average	1.25	1.27	1.32	1.39	1.43	1.46	1.47
Series average	1.47						

== Couples still together ==
- Nathan Massey and Cara De La Hoyde – married in 2019. They have two children, born 2017 and 2020.
- Alex Bowen and Olivia Buckland – married in 2018. They have two children together, born 2022 and 2025.
