= Mal Nicol =

Scottish television personality (born 1997)

- Born: Malissa Nicol; 9 October 1997 (age 27); Edinburgh, Scotland
- Occupation: Television personality
- Television: Love Island

Malissa Nicol (born 9 September 1997) is a Scottish television personality. She rose to prominence when she was cast on the tenth series of the ITV2 dating series Love Island.

== Life and career ==
Malissa Nicol was born on 9 September 1997 in Edinburgh. She is of Scottish and Thai descent. Nicol was in a brief relationship with 2022 Love Island contestant and fellow Edinburgh resident Jay Younger. After relocating to London, Nicol began working as a picture researcher, with her credits including the BBC property series Homes Under the Hammer. She also worked for Bauer Media Group, working for magazines Heat and Closer, up until her casting on Love Island. She did not tell her colleagues that she had been cast, and when she left the workplace, they guessed that she would appear on Love Island.

In 2023, it was announced that Nicol had been cast on the tenth series of the ITV2 dating series Love Island. She entered as a "bombshell" on day 16 of the series. During her time on the series, Nicol participated in the annual "heart rate challenge", in which she danced to "Greedy" by Ariana Grande. Her dance went viral on social media due to her awkwardness, with Grazia calling it "relatable yet cringey". Nicol was voted out of the series on day 23, with viewers of the show missing her following her exit. Nicol has been in a relationship with investment banker Harvey Thrower since 2024. She was approached for Married at First Sight numerous times but declined due to their relationship.

== Filmography ==
Year	Title	Notes	Ref.
2022	Homes Under the Hammer	Researcher	2 episodes
2023	Love Island	Herself	Contestant
2023	Love Island: The Morning After	Herself	Guest
