= Sammy Root =

English television personality (born 2001)

- Born: Samuel Lewis Root; 10 May 2001 (age 25); Dartford, Kent, England
- Occupation: Television personality
- Years active: 2023–present
- Known for: Love Island; The Only Way Is Essex; Love Island: All Stars

Samuel Lewis Root (born 10 May 2001) is an English television personality. After winning on the tenth series of Love Island in 2023, he became a regular cast member on the ITVBe reality series The Only Way Is Essex the following year. In 2025, he appeared on the second series of Love Island: All Stars.

== Life and career ==
Samuel Lewis Root was born on in Dartford, Kent. Prior to appearing on television, he worked as a project manager. In 2023, he became a contestant on the tenth series of the ITV2 reality dating show Love Island. He entered the villa as a "bombshell" on Day 4, and during the series was coupled up with Jess Harding, Mal Nicol and Amber Wise respectively. He ultimately reunited with the former, and Root and Harding went on to win the series with 34.57% of the final vote, beating Whitney Adebayo and Lochan Nowacki. The pair entered a relationship, however they split two months later. In 2024, Root joined the cast of The Only Way Is Essex for its thirty-third series and has appeared regularly since. In January 2025, it was announced that Root would return to Love Island to appear as a contestant on the second series of Love Island: All Stars.

== Filmography ==
As himself
Year	Title	Notes	Ref.
2023	Love Island	Winner; series 10	
2024–2025	The Only Way Is Essex	Series regular	
2025	Love Island: All Stars	Contestant; series 2	
