= Elma Pazar =

English television personality (born 1992)

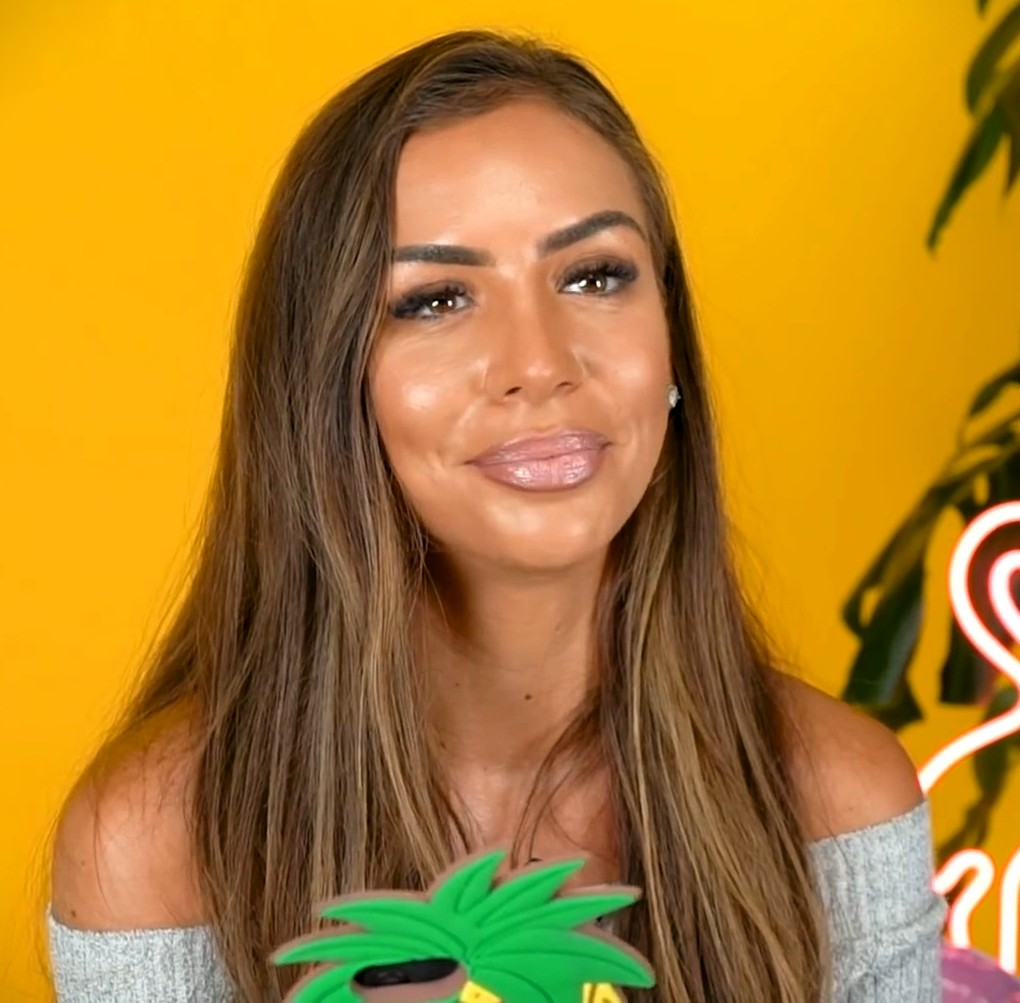
- Pazar in 2019
- Born: Elmaziye Pazar; 7 July 1992 (age 34); Hackney, London, England
- Occupation: Television personality
- Years active: 2019–present
- Known for: Love Island; The Only Way Is Essex; Love Island: All Stars

Elmaziye Pazar (born 7 July 1992) is an English television personality. After appearing on the fifth series of Love Island in 2019, she became a regular cast member on the ITVBe reality series The Only Way Is Essex in 2022. In 2025, she appeared on the second series of Love Island: All Stars.

== Life and career ==
Elmaziye Pazar was born on 7 July 1992 in Hackney, London to Turkish Cypriot parents. Prior to appearing on television, she worked as an eyelash technician. In 2019, she became a contestant on the fifth series of the ITV2 reality dating show Love Island. She entered the villa as a "bombshell" on Day 10, alongside Maura Higgins. After coupling up with Anton Danyluk, they were voted one of least compatible couples and Pazar was subsequently chosen to be dumped from the island by her fellow contestants. Following her departure from the villa, she appeared on the daytime programme Lorraine. In 2022, Pazar joined the cast of The Only Way Is Essex for its twenty-ninth series and has appeared regularly since. In 2025, it was announced that Pazar would return to Love Island to appear as a contestant on the second series of Love Island: All Stars.

== Filmography ==
As herself
Year	Title	Notes	Ref.
2019	Love Island	Contestant; series 5	
2019	Lorraine	Guest; 1 episode	
2022–present	The Only Way Is Essex	Series regular	
2025	Love Island: All Stars	Contestant; series 2	
