= Dani Imbert =

English television personality (born 1998)

- Born: Dani Kara Imbert; 3 April 1998 (age 27); Havering, England
- Occupation: Television personality
- Television: The Only Way Is Essex; Celebrity Ex on the Beach

Dani Kara Imbert (born 3 April 1998) is an English television personality, known for appearing as a cast member on the ITV reality series The Only Way Is Essex since 2021. She also appeared on Celebrity Ex on the Beach in 2026.

== Life and career ==
Dani Kara Imbert was born on 3 April 1998 in Havering. In 2021, she joined the cast of the ITV reality series The Only Way Is Essex. She originally joined as the girlfriend of Liam "Gatsby" Blackwell and has appeared as a cast member since the show's twenty-eighth series. In March 2026, Imbert is set to appear as a cast member on the fourth series of Celebrity Ex on the Beach, during which she will be reunited with ex-partners Blackwell and Reiss Boyce.

== Filmography ==
As herself
Year	Title	Notes	Ref.
2021–present	The Only Way Is Essex	Series regular	
2026	Celebrity Ex on the Beach	Cast member; series 4	
