= Diags =

English television personality (born 1991)

- Born: James Lawrence Bennewith; 15 May 1991 (age 34); Waltham Forest, Greater London, England
- Occupation: Television personality
- Television: The Only Way Is Essex; Celebrity Ghost Hunt; Celebrity Coach Trip

James Lawrence Bennewith (born 15 May 1991), better known as Diags, is an English television personality. He is the longest serving cast member on the ITVBe reality series The Only Way Is Essex, having appeared in the show on a continuous basis since 2012. He also appeared as a contestant on the fifth series of Celebrity Coach Trip in 2019.

== Life and career ==
Bennewith was born on 15 May 1991 in Waltham Forest, Greater London. In 2012, Bennewith joined the cast of The Only Way Is Essex, and has been appearing regularly since the show's fourth series. He gained the nickname "Diags" due to his diagonal smile in photos. Bennewith ranked 5th in a Digital Spy readers poll to determine the favourite cast member. His time on the show has documented his relationships with Fran Parman and Elma Pazar, as well as his friendship with Chloe Sims. Following the departure of mainstay Chloe Sims in 2021, Bennewith became the show's longest serving cast member. In 2017, he was ranked number 1 on a Digital Spy list of "underwhelming reality television stars".

Bennewith has made various guest appearances on television shows including Sunday Side Up in 2013, Keep It in the Family in 2015 and FHM: The Last of the Lads' Mags in 2016.

In 2018, Bennewith appeared as a contestant on Celebrity Ghost Hunt alongside Roxanne Pallett and Georgia Harrison. In 2019, Bennewith was a contestant on the fifth series of Celebrity Coach Trip, alongside The Only Way Is Essex co-star James Argent. The pair were voted off on the penultimate day of the trip. In 2020, Bennewith appeared on the BBC dating series Eating with My Ex alongside ex-girlfriend Fran Parman. Outside of television, Bennewith works for his family plumbing business.

== Filmography ==
As himself
Year	Title	Notes
2012–present	The Only Way Is Essex	Series regular
2013	Sunday Side Up	Guest
2014	This Morning	Guest
2015	Keep It in the Family	Guest
2016	FHM: The Last of the Lads' Mags	Guest
2018	Celebrity Ghost Hunt	Contestant
2018	Celebrity Dinner Date	Himself
2019	Celebrity Coach Trip	Contestant; series 5
2020	Eating with My Ex	Guest
