= Love Island (2015 TV series) series 13 =

Love Island
- Series 13
- Promotional poster for the series
- Presented by: Maya Jama
- No. of days: 48
- No. of contestants: 38
- Winners: Julia Majchrzak; Lorenzo Alessi
- Runners-up: Jasmine Müller; Kavan Murphy
- Companion shows: Love Island: Aftersun; Love Island: The Debrief
- No. of episodes: 57

Release
- Original network: ITV2
- Original release: 1 June – 27 July 2026

Series chronology
- ← Previous; Series 12

The thirteenth series of Love Island began broadcasting on 1 June 2026 on ITV2. Maya Jama returned to present the series, with Iain Stirling again returning as narrator. Jama also returned to host companion show Love Island: Aftersun, whilst Toni Laites, Shakira Khan and Yasmin Pettet began fronting a new visualised podcast, Love Island: The Debrief. It is the last series to be hosted by Maya Jama.

On 27 July 2026, the series was won by Julia Majchrzak and Lorenzo Alessi, who received 62.4% of the public vote, with Jasmine Müller and Kavan Murphy placing as the runner-ups.

== Production ==
Following the third series of the spin-off Love Island: All Stars, which aired between January and February 2026, it was confirmed that the thirteenth series of Love Island would air later in the year. Applications for the show opened whilst the twelfth series was airing the previous year. The series is set to begin on 1 June 2026, with Maya Jama returning as host, and will again be filmed in Mallorca.

The first teaser for the series aired in May 2026. A FIFA World Cup themed teaser, with the series set to air at the same time as the 2026 FIFA World Cup, it featured a beach ball bouncing into and landing in the pool of a love heart shaped neon themed football stadium, with the words "crack on" written above the entrance, and a model of the Love Island villa inside it. Meanwhile an audience can be heard football chanting the theme tune, prior to narrator Iain Stirling saying "Love Island 2026." An extended version of the trailer began airing the following week, in which Stirling says "Get ready for the hottest competition of the summer" before Jama adds "We've got a squad of worldies and a bench full of bombshells, giving more fire pit drama, deeper post match up analysis and spicier villa action reviews". Jama then calls on Stirling, who is seen commentating from above the stadium in a blimp and adds "Who's got zero game, "good morning islanders" and who'll go all the way". Jama concludes by stating "Love Island, it's all kicking off".

Following Amy Hart and Indiyah Polack's departure from the programme's spin-off visualised podcast, Love Island: The Morning After, it was announced in May 2026 that a new visualised podcast would replace it and would air after Love Island on ITV2 and ITVX. The podcast is titled Love Island: The Debrief and is hosted by Toni Laites, Shakira Khan and Yasmin Pettet who finished first, second and third in the previous series, respectively. It airs Monday to Friday from 10 pm to 10:30 pm, and marks the first time that the podcast spin-off has aired on television also.

== Islanders ==
The original islanders for the thirteenth series were announced on 26 May 2026. Islanders Kavan and Aidan Murphy are brothers. Islander Halle Brown is the daughter of retired footballer Wes Brown. George Knight left the villa on Day 5, initially citing a family problem as the reason for his exit, however it was subsequently revealed he had been removed due to the use of offensive language. Casa Amor islander Gabriel Garland was removed on Day 24, due to his alleged involvement in a stabbing.

Islander	Age	Hometown	Entered	Exited	Status	Ref.
Julia Majchrzak	26	London (Note: Julia Majchrzak is originally from Poland but was residing in London at the time of casting and filming.)	Day 23	Day 48	Winner	
Lorenzo Alessi	28	Hertfordshire	Day 1	Day 48	Winner	
Jasmine Müller	27	Dubai, UAE (Note: Jasmine Müller is originally from Dubai but was residing in London at the time of casting and filming.)	Day 1	Day 48	Runner-up	
Kavan Murphy	21	Sevenoaks	Day 4	Day 48	Runner-up	
Angelista Gunda	24	Luton	Day 1	Day 48	Third place	
Simbarashe "Simba" Kudyiwa	24	Enfield	Day 7	Day 48	Third place	
Thomas "Tommy" Stagg	23	Witham	Day 23	Day 46	Dumped	
Yasmin Hadlow	23	Broadstairs	Day 2	Day 46	Dumped	
Mica Harris	21	Barbados (Note: Mica Harris is originally from Barbados but was residing in London at the time of casting and filming.)	Day 1	Day 46	Dumped	
Samraj Toor	25	Birmingham	Day 1	Day 46	Dumped	
Aidan Murphy	23	Sevenoaks	Day 1	Day 45	Dumped	
Priya Jaswal	25	Surrey	Day 4	Day 45	Dumped	
Ethan Ellis	28	Nottingham	Day 32	Day 40	Dumped	
Ellie Chadwick	24	Fauldhouse	Day 1	Day 38	Walked	
Finley Maddock	23	Bridgend	Day 14	Day 38	Dumped	
Martha Rothwell	25	London	Day 23	Day 38	Dumped	
Elicia Bailey	23	Rotherham	Day 32	Day 38	Dumped	
Jordon Wilson	28	Surrey	Day 23	Day 38	Dumped	
Lola Deal	28	Margate	Day 1	Day 33	Dumped	
Seán ''Fitzy'' Fitzgerald	25	Galway	Day 1	Day 33	Dumped	
Charleen Murphy	27	Dublin	Day 23	Day 30	Dumped	
Marà Pirez	25	Luton	Day 23	Day 30	Dumped	
Aaron Badibo	26	East London	Day 23	Day 26	Dumped	
Carlos Borges	22	New Forest	Day 23	Day 26	Dumped	
Nevaeh David	22	Gloucester	Day 23	Day 26	Dumped	
Olivia Sanderson	23	Doncaster	Day 23	Day 26	Dumped	
Will Bessant	23	Barnsley	Day 23	Day 26	Dumped	
Gabriel Garland	24	London	Day 23	Day 24	Removed	
Tina Rad	25	Newcastle	Day 14	Day 20	Dumped	
Tommy Murphy	28	Newcastle	Day 7	Day 20	Dumped	
Chidi Ogandu	27	Milton Keynes	Day 14	Day 17	Dumped	
Halle Brown	23	Altrincham	Day 14	Day 17	Dumped	
Namibia Olpherts	25	Leeds	Day 5	Day 16	Dumped	
Samuel "Sam" Workman	25	Dudley	Day 1	Day 16	Dumped	
Ope Sowande	27	Boston	Day 1	Day 10	Dumped	
Victoria Onanusi	25	Kildare	Day 5	Day 10	Dumped	
Robyn Langton	21	Liverpool	Day 1	Day 7	Dumped	
George Knight	28	Winchester	Day 2	Day 5	Removed	

== Coupling and elimination history ==
The couples were chosen shortly after the islanders enter the villa.

	Week 1				Week 2		Week 3			Week 4		Week 5			Week 6			Week 7					Week 8
	Day 1	Day 3	Day 4	Day 7	Day 10	Day 13	Day 16	Day 17	Day 20	Day 22	Day 26	Day 30	Day 33	Day 34	Day 36	Day 38	Day 40	Day 44	Day 46				Final
Julia	Not in Villa										Lorenzo	Lorenzo	Lola & Seán to dump	Lorenzo		Safe	Lorenzo	Aidan & Priya; Jasmine & Kavan; Least compatible	Vulnerable	Safe	Vulnerable	Finalist	Winner (Day 48)
Lorenzo	Jasmine	Safe	Jasmine	Priya	Safe	Yasmin		Tina & Aidan to dump	Tina & Tommy M. to dump	Yasmin	Julia	Julia	Lola & Seán to dump	Julia		Safe	Julia	Aidan & Priya; Jasmine & Kavan; Least compatible	Vulnerable	Safe	Vulnerable	Finalist	Winner (Day 48)
Jasmine	Lorenzo	Safe	Lorenzo	Kavan	Safe	Kavan		Halle & Tommy M. to dump	Safe	Kavan	Single	Kavan	Safe	Kavan		Safe	Kavan	Julia & Lorenzo; Aidan & Priya; Least compatible	Vulnerable	Safe	Vulnerable	Finalist	Runner-up (Day 48)
Kavan	Not in Villa		Ellie	Jasmine	Safe	Jasmine		Halle & Tommy M. to dump	Safe	Jasmine	Charleen	Jasmine	Safe	Jasmine		Safe	Jasmine	Julia & Lorenzo; Aidan & Priya; Least compatible	Vulnerable	Safe	Vulnerable	Finalist	Runner-up (Day 48)
Angelista	Ope	Safe	Ope	Simba	Safe	Simba		Mica & Chidi to dump	Safe	Simba	Single	Simba	Safe	Simba		Safe	Simba	Aidan & Priya; Tommy S. & Yasmin; Least compatible	Vulnerable	Safe	Vulnerable	Finalist	Third place (Day 48)
Simba	Not in Villa			Angelista	Safe	Angelista		Mica & Chidi to dump	Vulnerable	Angelista	Marà	Angelista	Safe	Angelista		Safe	Angelista	Aidan & Priya; Tommy S. & Yasmin; Least compatible	Vulnerable	Safe	Vulnerable	Finalist	Third place (Day 48)
Tommy S.	Not in Villa										Yasmin	Yasmin	Safe	Yasmin		Safe	Yasmin	Aidan & Priya; Mica & Samraj; Least compatible	Vulnerable	Safe	Vulnerable	Eliminated	Dumped (Day 46)
Yasmin	Not in Villa	Ellie & Samraj to dump	Aidan	Aidan	Safe	Lorenzo		Tina & Aidan to dump	Safe	Lorenzo	Tommy S.	Tommy S.	Safe	Tommy S.		Safe	Tommy S.	Aidan & Priya; Mica & Samraj; Least compatible	Vulnerable	Safe	Vulnerable	Eliminated	Dumped (Day 46)
Mica	Samraj	Safe	George	Samraj	Safe	Sam	Chidi	Halle & Tommy M. to dump	Safe	Samraj	Samraj	Samraj	Vulnerable	Samraj		Vulnerable	Samraj	Aidan & Priya; Julia & Lorenzo; Least compatible	Vulnerable	Eliminated	Tommy S. & Yasmin to dump	Dumped (Day 46)	
Samraj	Mica	Vulnerable	Priya	Mica	Safe	Priya		Halle & Tommy M. to dump	Safe	Mica	Mica	Mica	Vulnerable	Mica		Vulnerable	Mica	Aidan & Priya; Julia & Lorenzo; Least compatible	Vulnerable	Eliminated	Tommy S. & Yasmin to dump	Dumped (Day 46)	
Aidan	Ellie	Safe	Yasmin	Yasmin	Safe	Namibia	Tina	Mica & Chidi to dump	Vulnerable	Priya	Martha	Priya	Safe	Single	Elicia	Safe	Priya	Julia & Lorenzo; Mica & Samraj; Least compatible	Dumped (Day 45)				
Priya	Not in Villa		Samraj	Lorenzo	Safe	Samraj		Halle & Tommy M. to dump	Vulnerable	Aidan	Jordon	Aidan	Safe	Ethan		Safe	Aidan	Julia & Lorenzo; Mica & Samraj; Least compatible	Dumped (Day 45)				
Ethan	Not in Villa												Immune	Priya		Safe	Single	Dumped (Day 40)	Mica & Samraj to dump		Dumped (Day 40)		
Ellie	Aidan	Vulnerable	Kavan	Tommy M.	Safe	Tommy M.	Finley	Mica & Chidi to dump	Tina & Tommy M. to dump	Finley	Finley	Finley	Safe	Single	Finley	Safe	Walked (Day 38)		Tommy S. & Yasmin to dump		Walked (Day 38)		
Finley	Not in Villa						Ellie	Mica & Chidi to dump	Safe	Ellie	Ellie	Ellie	Safe	Elicia	Ellie	Vulnerable	Dumped (Day 38)		Mica & Samraj to dump		Dumped (Day 38)		
Martha	Not in Villa										Aidan	Jordon	Vulnerable	Jordon		Vulnerable	Dumped (Day 38)		Mica & Samraj to dump		Dumped (Day 38)		
Elicia	Not in Villa												Immune	Finley	Aidan	Eliminated	Dumped (Day 38)		Mica & Samraj to dump		Dumped (Day 38)		
Jordon	Not in Villa										Priya	Martha	Vulnerable	Martha		Eliminated	Dumped (Day 38)		Mica & Samraj to dump		Dumped (Day 38)		
Lola	Seán	Safe	Seán	Seán	Safe	Seán		Halle & Tommy M. to dump	Vulnerable	Seán	Seán	Seán	Vulnerable	Dumped (Day 33)					Julia & Lorenzo to dump		Dumped (Day 33)		
Seán	Lola	Safe	Lola	Lola	Safe	Lola		Halle & Tommy M. to dump	Safe	Lola	Lola	Lola	Vulnerable	Dumped (Day 33)					Julia & Lorenzo to dump		Dumped (Day 33)		
Charleen	Not in Villa										Kavan	Single	Dumped (Day 30)						Jasmine & Kavan to dump		Dumped (Day 30)		
Marà	Not in Villa										Simba	Single	Dumped (Day 30)						Jasmine & Kavan to dump		Dumped (Day 30)		
Aaron	Not in Villa										Single	Dumped (Day 26)											
Carlos	Not in Villa										Single	Dumped (Day 26)											
Nevaeh	Not in Villa										Single	Dumped (Day 26)											
Olivia	Not in Villa										Single	Dumped (Day 26)											
Will	Not in Villa										Single	Dumped (Day 26)											
Gabriel	Not in Villa										Removed (Day 24)												
Tina	Not in Villa						Aidan	Mica & Chidi to dump	Vulnerable	Dumped (Day 20)									Tommy S. & Yasmin to dump		Dumped (Day 20)		
Tommy M.	Not in Villa			Ellie	Safe	Ellie	Halle	Mica & Chidi to dump	Vulnerable	Dumped (Day 20)									Mica & Samraj to dump		Dumped (Day 20)		
Chidi	Not in Villa						Mica	Halle & Tommy M. to dump	Dumped (Day 17)										Jasmine & Kavan to dump		Dumped (Day 17)		
Halle	Not in Villa						Tommy M.	Mica & Chidi to dump	Dumped (Day 17)										Mica & Samraj to dump		Dumped (Day 17)		
Namibia	Not in Villa			Sam	Safe	Aidan	Single	Dumped (Day 16)											Tommy S. & Yasmin to dump		Dumped (Day 16)		
Sam	Robyn	Safe	Robyn	Namibia	Safe	Mica	Single	Dumped (Day 16)											Tommy S. & Yasmin to dump		Dumped (Day 16)		
Ope	Angelista	Safe	Angelista	Victoria	Eliminated	Dumped (Day 10)													Tommy S. & Yasmin to dump		Dumped (Day 10)		
Victoria	Not in Villa			Ope	Eliminated	Dumped (Day 10)													Tommy S. & Yasmin to dump		Dumped (Day 10)		
Robyn	Sam	Safe	Sam	Single	Dumped (Day 7)														Mica & Samraj to dump		Dumped (Day 7)		
George	Not in Villa	Ellie & Samraj to dump	Mica	Removed (Day 5)																			
Notes	none	1	2	3	4	none	5	6	7	none	8	none	9	none		10	none	11	12		13		14
Removed	none			George	none						Gabriel	none											
Walked	none															Ellie	none						
Dumped	No; Dumping	Ellie & Samraj; George & Yasmin's choice to dump	No; Dumping	Robyn; Failed to couple up	Victoria & Ope; Islanders' choice to dump	No; Dumping	Namibia, Sam; Failed to couple up	Chidi, Halle; Islanders' choice to dump	Tina, Tommy M. Ellie & Lorenzo's choice to dump	No; Dumping	Aaron, Carlos, Nevaeh, Olivia, Will; Failed to couple up	Charleen, Marà; Failed to couple up	Lola & Seán; Julia & Lorenzo's choice to dump	No; Dumping		Elicia, Jordon; Public's choice to dump	Ethan; Failed to couple up	Aidan & Priya; Public's choice to dump	Mica & Samraj; 8 of 19 votes to dump		Tommy S. & Yasmin; Mica and Samraj's choice to dump		
Dumped	No; Dumping	Ellie & Samraj; George & Yasmin's choice to dump	No; Dumping	Robyn; Failed to couple up	Victoria & Ope; Islanders' choice to dump	No; Dumping	Namibia, Sam; Failed to couple up	Chidi, Halle; Islanders' choice to dump	Tina, Tommy M. Ellie & Lorenzo's choice to dump	No; Dumping	Aaron, Carlos, Nevaeh, Olivia, Will; Failed to couple up	Charleen, Marà; Failed to couple up	Lola & Seán; Julia & Lorenzo's choice to dump	No; Dumping		Elicia, Jordon; Public's choice to dump	Ethan; Failed to couple up	Aidan & Priya; Public's choice to dump	Mica & Samraj; 8 of 19 votes to dump		Tommy S. & Yasmin; Mica and Samraj's choice to dump		Angelista & Simba; 26% to win
Dumped	No; Dumping	Ellie & Samraj; George & Yasmin's choice to dump	No; Dumping	Robyn; Failed to couple up	Victoria & Ope; Islanders' choice to dump	No; Dumping	Namibia, Sam; Failed to couple up	Chidi, Halle; Islanders' choice to dump	Tina, Tommy M. Ellie & Lorenzo's choice to dump	No; Dumping	Aaron, Carlos, Nevaeh, Olivia, Will; Failed to couple up	Charleen, Marà; Failed to couple up	Lola & Seán; Julia & Lorenzo's choice to dump	No; Dumping		Finley, Martha; Islanders' choice to dump	Ethan; Failed to couple up	Aidan & Priya; Public's choice to dump	Mica & Samraj; 8 of 19 votes to dump		Tommy S. & Yasmin; Mica and Samraj's choice to dump		Jasmine & Kavan; 37.6% to win
Dumped	No; Dumping	Ellie & Samraj; George & Yasmin's choice to dump	No; Dumping	Robyn; Failed to couple up	Victoria & Ope; Islanders' choice to dump	No; Dumping	Namibia, Sam; Failed to couple up	Chidi, Halle; Islanders' choice to dump	Tina, Tommy M. Ellie & Lorenzo's choice to dump	No; Dumping	Aaron, Carlos, Nevaeh, Olivia, Will; Failed to couple up	Charleen, Marà; Failed to couple up	Lola & Seán; Julia & Lorenzo's choice to dump	No; Dumping		Finley, Martha; Islanders' choice to dump	Ethan; Failed to couple up	Aidan & Priya; Public's choice to dump	Mica & Samraj; 8 of 19 votes to dump		Tommy S. & Yasmin; Mica and Samraj's choice to dump		Julia & Lorenzo; 62.4% to win

=== Notes ===
- ^Note 1: On Day 2, George and Yasmin arrived after the initial coupling. They were told that in 24 hours they would have dump a boy and a girl from the island. They chose Ellie and Samraj. However, they were both given a second chance after leaving the villa and were not dumped.
- ^Note 2: On Day 4, Kavan and Priya got to recouple first. Since Ellie and Samraj were given a second chance with them, if Kavan or Priya did not choose them, they would be dumped. Kavan chose to couple up with Ellie, and Priya chose Samraj. As a result, both of them were safe.
- ^Note 3: On Day 7, Angelista, Ellie, and Robyn were left single following the recoupling. Two new bombshells, Simba and Tommy M., were able to choose which single girl to couple with. They ultimately chose Angelista and Ellie, respectively, leaving Robyn dumped.
- ^Note 4: On Day 10, following a dare to rank the couples from strongest to weakest connection, Victoria and Ope were dumped from the villa.
- ^Note 5: On Day 16, the sleepover bombshells had to steal an islander of their choosing. Halle chose to steal Tommy M., Finley stole Ellie, Chidi stole Mica and Tina stole Aidan. This left Namibia and Sam single and dumped from the island.
- ^Note 6: On Day 17, islanders had to vote on the least compatible couple. As Mica & Chidi and Halle & Tommy M. received the most votes, they became vulnerable. They had to come to decision on which two islanders out of the four to dump. They chose Halle and Chidi.
- ^Note 7: On Day 20, following a public vote for the viewer's most favourite boy and girl islanders, Aidan, Lola, Priya, Simba, Tina and Tommy M., were all at risk of being dumped. It was then down to Ellie and Lorenzo, who had received the most public votes, to decide which boy and girl islanders to dump. They chose Tina and Tommy M., who were therefore dumped from the island.
- ^Note 8: As the final part for the Casa Amor twist in week 4, Casa Amor and the villa held two separate re-coupling ceremonies for the original islanders to choose whether to return to their previous partner or pick any new partner. Any of the 11 new islanders that remained single by the end of either ceremony was dumped from the villa. However, if one of the 14 original islanders remained single at the end of both ceremonies, they would still remain in the villa, but as a single islander. Aaron, Carlos, Nevaeh, Olivia, and Will remained single at the end the night, and were all dumped from the villa.
- ^Note 9: On Day 33, following a public vote, Julia and Lorenzo were voted as favorite couple. Together, they had to decide to dump one couple with the least votes. After receiving the least amount of votes, Martha and Jordon, Lola and Seán, and Mica and Samraj, were all vulnerable. Before Julia and Lorenzo make their decision, Lola volunteered herself and Seán to be dumped. Julia and Lorenzo ultimately decided to dump Lola and Seán.
- ^Note 10: On Day 38, following a public vote, it was announced that Martha, Elicia and Mica, and Jordon, Finley and Samraj had received the fewest votes from the public and were therefore vulnerable and at risk of being dumped. Elicia and Jordon received the fewest votes and were dumped immediately. The safe islanders had to collectively decide which of the remaining vulnerable islanders would be dumped. They chose Martha and Finley.
- ^Note 11: On Day 44, the islanders voted for the two couples they thought were the least compatible. The three couples who received the most votes, Aidan and Priya, Mica and Samraj, and Julia and Lorenzo, became vulnerable. On Day 45, the public voted for the couple they wanted to save. The couple with the fewest votes, Aidan and Priya, were dumped from the island.
- ^Note 12: On Day 46, the dumped islanders from the season returned to the villa to dump one couple from the villa. Ope, Sam, Tina, Victoria, Namibia and Ellie voted for Yasmin and Tommy S., Lola and Seán voted for Julia and Lorenzo, and Chidi, Charleen, Marà voted for Jasmine and Kavan. Tommy M., Robyn, Ethan, Elicia, Finley, Halle, Jordon, and Martha voted for Mica and Samraj. As Mica and Samraj received the most votes, they were dumped from the island.
- ^Note 13: Following Mica and Samraj's dumping, they had to decide which couple would be dumped and miss the finale.
- ^Note 14: The public voted for which couple they think should win Love Island. The couple with the most votes were declared the winners of Love Island and received the grand prize money.

== Weekly summary ==
The main events in the Love Island villa are summarised in the table below.

Week 1	Entrances	On Day 1, Aidan, Angelista, Ellie, Jasmine, Lola, Lorenzo, Mica, Ope, Robyn, Sam, Samraj, and Seán entered the villa.; On Day 2, George and Yasmin entered the villa.; On Day 4, Kavan and Priya entered the villa.; On Day 5, Namibia and Victoria entered the villa.; On Day 7, Simba and Tommy M. entered the villa.
Week 1	Coupling	On Day 1, the islanders coupled up for the first time by deciding who they wanted to couple up with. Mica picked Samraj, Jasmine chose Lorenzo, Ellie coupled up with Aidan, Angelista with Ope, Seán chose Lola, leaving Robyn with Sam.; On Day 4, the islanders recoupled for the first time. As the newest islanders, Kavan and Priya got to choose who they wanted to couple up with first. However, since Ellie and Samraj were given a second chance with them, if Kavan or Priya did not choose them, they would be dumped. Kavan chose to couple up with Ellie, and Priya chose Samraj. As a result, both of them were safe. Lola and Seán, Angelista and Ope, Jasmine and Lorenzo, and Robyn and Sam all remained together, whilst Yasmin picked Aidan, and Mica picked George.; On Day 7, the islanders recoupled with the boys choosing which girl they wanted to couple up with. However as the newest islanders, Namibia and Victoria were the first to pick. They picked Sam and Ope respectively. Seán and Lola and Aidan and Yasmin remained together, whilst Samraj reunited with Mica, Kavan chose Jasmine, and Lorenzo picked Priya. Angelista, Ellie, and Robyn were left single. New bombshells Simba and Tommy M. had to choose who to couple up with. They picked Angelista and Ellie, respectively. As a result, Robyn was left single and dumped from the island.
Week 1	Challenges	On Day 1, the islanders took part in an icebreaker game in which Maya asked them questions where they took a sip of their drink if they agreed with the question being asked. They had to answer the question if they took a sip.; On Day 2, the islanders took part in phone roulette. Each of the islanders phones were placed into a box, with one islander choosing a phone from the box. Whoever's phone was selected would receive a text with a task, with the chosen islander having to complete it.
Week 1	Dates	On Day 4, dumped islanders Ellie and Samraj went on dates with new bombshells Kavan and Priya.; On Day 5, following the entrance of Namibia and Victoria, they were able to each pick two boys they would like to explore on a date. Namibia chose Lorenzo and Sam, while Victoria dated Ope and Samraj.
Week 1	Exits	On Day 3, following George and Yasmin's arrival, they chose Ellie and Samraj to dump from the island. However, they were both given a second chance to remain in the villa and unbeknownst to their fellow islanders, spent the night in the hideaway before returning the following day.; On Day 5, George left the villa, initially citing a family problem as the reason for his exit, however it was subsequently revealed he had been removed due to the use of offensive language.; On Day 7, Robyn was dumped from the island after failing to couple up.
Week 2	Entrances	On Day 14, Chidi, Finley, Halle and Tina entered the sleepover villa.
Week 2	Coupling	On Day 13, the islanders recoupled with the girls choosing which boy they wanted to couple up with. Lola and Seán, Angelista and Simba, Jasmine and Kavan and Ellie and Tommy M. remained together, whilst Priya reunited with Samraj, Yasmin chose Lorenzo, Namibia chose Aidan and Mica chose Sam.
Week 2	Challenges	On Day 9, the islanders competed in It's Not That Deep where the girl or boy islanders slide into a pool, then grabbed a card with a fact about the opposite gender. They answered who they thought the comment was about by throwing a cocktail at that islander.; On Day 10, the islanders played a game of Truth or Dare.; On Day 12, the girls competed in a kissing challenge. They kissed each boy in turn while the boys were blindfolded and rated the kisses out of ten. Mica won the challenge after receiving the highest score.; On Day 14, the islanders at the sleepover villa played a game where they had to complete a dare if they dropped an ice block.
Week 2	Dates	On Day 11, Lola and Seán left the villa to go on their first date.
Week 2	Exits	On Day 10, following a dare to rank the couples from strongest to weakest connection, Victoria and Ope were dumped from the villa.
Week 3	Coupling	On Day 16, the sleepover bombshells had to steal an islander of their choosing. Halle chose to steal Tommy M., Finley stole Ellie, Chidi stole Mica and Tina stole Aidan.
Week 3	Challenges	On Day 19, the islanders took part in the heart rate challenge. Angelista and Simba won the challenge for raising their partners heart rate the most.; On Day 21, the islanders took part in game where islanders could choose between "Public Tea: or "Villa Receipts". When choosing receipts, they must decide who said the quote. When choosing tea, they decided who the social media posts were about.
Week 3	Exits	On Day 16, following the new bombshells stealing their current couple, Namibia and Sam were single and dumped from the villa.; On Day 17, islanders had to vote on the least compatible couple. As Mica & Chidi and Halle & Tommy M. received the most votes, they became vulnerable. They had to come to decision on which guy islander and which girl islander to dump. They chose Chidi and Halle.; On Day 20, following a public vote, Ellie and Lorenzo were voted as the favorite girl and favorite boy. Together, they had to decide to dump one of the vulnerable boys and one of the vulnerable girls. After receiving the least amount of votes, Lola, Priya, and Tina, and Aidan, Simba, and Tommy M. were all vulnerable. Ellie and Lorenzo decided to dump Tina and Tommy M.
Week 4	Entrances	On Day 23, Aaron, Carlos, Gabriel, Jordon, Tommy S., and Will entered the main villa.; On Day 23, Charleen, Julia, Marà, Martha, Nevaeh, and Olivia entered Casa Amor.
Week 4	Coupling	On Day 22, the islanders recoupled again with the boys choosing who they wanted to recouple with. Simba and Angelista, Finley and Ellie, Seán and Lola, Lorenzo and Yasmin, and Kavan and Jasmine all remained together, whilst Samraj reunited with Mica, and Aidan picked Priya.; On Day 26, as the final part for the Casa Amor twist, Casa Amor and the main villa held two separate re-coupling ceremonies for the original islanders to choose whether to return to their previous partner or pick any new partner. Ellie and Finley, Lola and Seán and Mica and Samraj all remained loyal to one another. Priya chose to recouple with Jordon and Yasmin chose Tommy S.. Aiden brought Martha to the main villa, Kavan brought Charleen, Lorenzo brought Julia and Simba brought Marà.
Week 4	Challenges	On Day 24, Casa Amor and the main villa went head-to-head in a game of "Don't Bottle It", a version of spin-the-bottle. The main villa ultimately and were rewarded with a cocktail party.; On Day 25, the girls in Casa Amor were tasked with taking secret selfies of the boys they felt fit a series of a categories. These images were then sent to the girls in the main villa.
Week 4	Exits	On Day 24, Gabriel was removed from the villa due to information that had come to light outside of the villa, regarding his alleged involvement in a stabbing case.; On Day 26, Casa Amor islanders, Aaron, Carlos, Nevaeh, Olivia, and Will remained single at the end of the night, and were all dumped from the villa.
Week 5	Entrances	On Day 32, Elicia and Ethan entered the villa.
Week 5	Coupling	On Day 30, the islanders recoupled with the boys choosing which girl they wanted to couple up with. Seán and Lola, Finley and Ellie, Lorenzo and Julia, Samraj and Mica, and Tommy S. and Yasmin remained together, whilst Aidan reunited with Priya, Kavan reunited with Jasmine, Simba reunited with Angelista, and Jordon chose Martha.; On Day 34, as the newest arrivals, Elicia and Ethan got to steal a boy and girl to couple up with. Elicia chose Finley and Ethan chose Priya, leaving Ellie and Aidan single.
Week 5	Challenges	On Day 33, the islanders competed in the "Snog, Marry, Pie" challenge where each islander had to snog, marry and pie an islander of their choice.
Week 5	Dates	On Day 32, new islanders Elicia and Ethan were each able to choose 3 islanders for a breakfast date. Elicia chose Finley, Lorenzo, and Tommy S., while Ethan chose Jasmine, Martha, and Priya.
Week 5	Exits	On Day 30, Charleen and Marà were dumped from the island after failing to couple up.; On Day 33, following a public vote, Julia and Lorenzo were voted as favorite couple. Together, they had to decide to dump one couple with the least votes. After receiving the least amount of votes, Martha and Jordon, Lola and Seán, and Mica and Samraj, were all vulnerable. Before Julia and Lorenzo make their decision, Lola volunteered herself and Seán to be dumped. Julia and Lorenzo decided to dump Lola and Seán.
Week 6	Coupling	On Day 36, the islanders recoupled again. Yasmin and Tommy S., Martha and Jordon, Simba and Angelista, Julia and Lorenzo, Mica and Samraj and Jasmine and Kavan remained together. Meanwhile Elicia chose Aidan, Priya chose Ethan, and Ellie coupled up with Finley.; On Day 40, the islanders recoupled with the girls choosing which boy they wanted to couple up with. Priya chose to recouple with Aiden, while Yasmin and Tommy S. Mica and Samraj, Julia and Lorenzo, Jasmine and Kavan and Angelista and Simba remained together. As a result, Ethan was left single and dumped from the island.
Week 6	Challenges	On Day 38, islanders competed in a game titled "If You Know, You Know", in which each couple stood behind a podium and had headphones and blindfolds on. One a time, a couple's phone would vibrate and they would have to choose a statement from the box and place it on the podium of the couple they felt best fitted the statement.; On Day 39, islanders competed in "Knowing Me, Knowing You", hosted by single islander Aidan, in which each couple were asked a question and had to write on their board which of their couple felt the question best related to.
Week 6	Dates	On Day 35, Elicia and Finley, and Priya and Ethan went on a double date.
Week 6	Exits	On Day 38, it was announced that Martha, Elicia and Mica, and Jordon, Finley and Samraj had received the fewest votes from the public and were therefore vulnerable and at risk of being dumped. Elicia and Jordon received the fewest votes and were dumped immediately. The safe islanders had to collectively decide which of the remaining vulnerable islanders would be dumped. They chose Martha and Finley respectively, after which Ellie decided to voluntarily leave the villa.
Week 7	Exits	On Day 45, following the islanders votes for their least compatible couple, Aidan and Priya, Julia and Lorenzo and Mica and Samraj, who all received votes, went head-to-head with in a public vote. It was then revealed that having received the fewest public votes, Aidan and Priya had been dumped.; On Day 46, dumped islanders from the season returned to the villa to pick what couple should be dumped from the villa. Ope, Sam, Tina, Victoria, Namibia and Ellie voted for Yasmin and Tommy S., Lola and Seán voted for Julia and Lorenzo, and Chidi, Charleen, Marà voted for Jasmine and Kavan. Tommy M., Robyn, Ethan, Elicia, Finley, Halle, Jordon, and Martha voted for Mica and Samraj. As Mica and Samraj received the most votes, they were dumped from the island.; On Day 46, following Mica and Samraj's dumping, they were told to dump one more couple from the island. They decided on Tommy S. and Yasmin, leaving them dumped from the villa.
Week 8	Exits	On Day 48, after receiving the least amount of votes, Angelista and Simba finished in third place. Julia and Lorenzo received the most votes and were crowned the winners of Love Island, leaving Jasmine and Kavan as the runners-up.

== Episodes ==
No. overall	No. in series	Title	Day(s)	Original release date	Prod. code
Week 1
538	1	"Episode 1"	Days 1–2	1 June 2026	1301
539	2	"Episode 2"	Day 2	2 June 2026	1302
540	3	"Episode 3"	Day 3	3 June 2026	1303
541	4	"Episode 4"	Days 3–4	4 June 2026	1304
542	5	"Episode 5"	Day 4	5 June 2026	1305
543	6	"Episode 6: Unseen Bits"	N/A (Note: This episode showcased events from the previous days in the week. No new or present days were featured.)	6 June 2026	1306
544	7	"Episode 7"	Day 5	7 June 2026	1307
545	8	"Episode 8"	Days 5–6	8 June 2026	1308
546	9	"Episode 9"	Days 6–7	9 June 2026	1309
Week 2
547	10	"Episode 10"	Days 7–8	10 June 2026	1310
548	11	"Episode 11"	Days 8–9	11 June 2026	1311
549	12	"Episode 12"	Day 10	12 June 2026	1312
550	13	"Episode 13: Unseen Bits"	N/A	13 June 2026	1313
551	14	"Episode 14"	Days 10–11	14 June 2026	1314
552	15	"Episode 15"	Days 11–12	15 June 2026	1315
553	16	"Episode 16"	Days 12–13	16 June 2026	1316
554	17	"Episode 17"	Day 14	17 June 2026	1317
Week 3
555	18	"Episode 18"	Days 14–15	18 June 2026	1318
556	19	"Episode 19"	Days 15–16	19 June 2026	1319
557	20	"Episode 20: Unseen Bits"	N/A	20 June 2026	1320
558	21	"Episode 21"	Days 16–17	21 June 2026	1321
559	22	"Episode 22"	Days 17–18	22 June 2026	1322
560	23	"Episode 23"	Days 18–19	23 June 2026	1323
561	24	"Episode 24"	Days 19–20	24 June 2026	1324
562	25	"Episode 25"	Days 20–21	25 June 2026	1325
Week 4
563	26	"Episode 26"	Days 21–22	26 June 2026	1326
564	27	"Episode 27: Unseen Bits"	N/A	27 June 2026	1327
565	28	"Episode 28"	Day 23	28 June 2026	1328
566	29	"Episode 29"	Days 23–24	29 June 2026	1329
567	30	"Episode 30"	Days 24–25	30 June 2026	1330
568	31	"Episode 31"	Days 25–26	1 July 2026	1331
569	32	"Episode 32"	Day 26	2 July 2026	1332
570	33	"Episode 33"	Day 27	3 July 2026	1333
571	34	"Episode 34: Unseen Bits"	N/A	4 July 2026	1334
572	35	"Episode 35"	Day 28	5 July 2026	1335
Week 5
573	36	"Episode 36"	Days 28–29	6 July 2026	1336
574	37	"Episode 37"	Days 29–30	7 July 2026	1337
575	38	"Episode 38"	Days 30–31	8 July 2026	1338
576	39	"Episode 39"	Days 31–32	9 July 2026	1339
577	40	"Episode 40"	Days 32–33	10 July 2026	1340
578	41	"Episode 41: Unseen Bits"	N/A	11 July 2026	1341
579	42	"Episode 42"	Days 33–34	12 July 2026	1342
580	43	"Episode 43"	Days 34–35	13 July 2026	1343
Week 6
581	44	"Episode 44"	Days 35–36	14 July 2026	1344
582	45	"Episode 45"	Days 36–37	15 July 2026	1345
583	46	"Episode 46"	Days 37–38	16 July 2026	1346
584	47	"Episode 47"	Days 38–39	17 July 2026	1347
585	48	"Episode 48: Unseen Bits"	N/A	18 July 2026	1348
586	49	"Episode 49"	Day 40	19 July 2026	1349
587	50	"Episode 50"	Day 40	20 July 2026	1350
588	51	"Episode 51"	Days 41–42	21 July 2026	1351
Week 7
589	52	"Episode 52"	Days 42–43	22 July 2026	1352
590	53	"Episode 53"	Days 43–44	23 July 2026	1353
591	54	"Episode 54"	Days 44–45	24 July 2026	1354
592	55	"Episode 55: Unseen Bits"	N/A	25 July 2026	1355
593	56	"Episode 56"	Days 45–46	26 July 2026	1356
594	57	"Episode 57"	Days 46–48	27 July 2026	1357

== Ratings ==
Official ratings are taken from Thinkbox. Because the Saturday episodes are "Unseen Bits" episodes rather than nightly highlights, these are not included in the overall averages. Viewing figures are consolidated 7-day viewing figures with pre-broadcast viewing and viewing on tablets, PCs and smartphones included.

	Viewers (millions)								
	Week 1	Week 2	Week 3	Week 4	Week 5	Week 6	Week 7	Week 8	Week 9
Sunday		1.39	1.27	1.22	—N/a	1.31	1.37	1.08	1.32
Monday	1.26	1.34	1.22	—N/a	1.31	1.29	1.35	1.11	1.09
Tuesday	1.38	1.32	1.18	—N/a	1.30	1.27	1.25	1.25	
Wednesday	1.33	1.32	1.12	—N/a	1.38	1.42	1.26	1.27	
Thursday	1.32	1.32	1.25	—N/a	1.35	1.23	1.33	1.27	
Friday	1.20	1.30	1.24	—N/a	1.35	1.43	1.30	1.36	
Weekly average	1.30	1.33	1.21	1.22	1.34	1.33	1.31	1.22	1.21
Running average	1.30	1.32	1.28	1.27	1.28	1.29	1.29	1.28	1.27
Series average	1.29								
Unseen Bits	0.26	0.32	0.22	—N/a	0.26	0.27	0.21	0.25	
