= Helena Ford =

English television personality (born 1996)

- Born: 27 February 1996 (age 30); Barnstaple, Devon, England
- Education: University of Gloucestershire
- Occupation: Television personality
- Years active: 2025–present
- Known for: Love Island; Love Island: All Stars

Helena Ford (born 27 February 1996) is an English television personality and social media influencer, known for appearing as a contestant on the twelfth series of Love Island in 2025 and the third series of Love Island: All Stars in 2026.

== Life and career ==
Helena Ford was born on 27 February 1996 in Barnstaple, Devon. Ford graduated from the University of Gloucestershire in 2017 with a degree in journalism. Prior to appearing on television, she worked as cabin crew for British Airways. In June 2025, she became a contestant on the twelfth series of the ITV2 reality dating show Love Island. During her time in the villa, she was coupled up with various contestants including Conor Phillips, Shea Mannings, Ben Holbrough, Blu Chegini, and Harry Cooksley, the latter of whom she was most involved with during her appearance. She and Chegini were coupled up together when they were dumped from the villa a week before the final.

In January 2026, it was announced that Ford would return to Love Island to appear as a contestant on the third series of Love Island: All Stars, six months after her original appearance. She again entered the villa as an original contestant on Day 1 and was dumped from the villa on Day 29. During her time in the villa, Helena was initially coupled up with Sean Stone and later recoupled with Carrington Rodriguez.

== Filmography ==
As herself
Year	Title	Notes	Ref.
2025	Love Island	Contestant; series 12	
2026	Love Island: All Stars	Contestant; series 3	
