= Harry Cooksley =

English footballer

Personal information
- Full name: Harry Edward Cooksley
- Date of birth: 15 November 1994 (age 32)
- Place of birth: Guildford, Surrey, England
- Position: Midfielder

Youth career
- 2002–2011: Reading
- 2011–2012: Queens Park Rangers

College career
| Years | Team | Apps | (Gls) |
| 2014–2015 | Limestone Saints | 37 | (17) |
| 2016–2017 | St. John's Red Storm | 31 | (9) |

Senior career*
| Years | Team | Apps | (Gls) |
| 2012–2013 | Aldershot Town | 1 | (0) |
| 2013–2014 | AFC Wimbledon | 0 | (0) |
| 2018 | Mallorca B | 3 | (0) |
| 2019 | Farnborough | 12 | (1) |
| 2019 | → Badshot Lea (loan) | 4 | (1) |
| 2019–2020 | Pinzgau Saalfelden | 27 | (10) |
| 2021–2022 | Farnborough | 7 | (0) |
| 2022 | → Hartley Wintney (loan) | 15 | (3) |
| 2022–2023 | Hartley Wintney | 24 | (8) |
| 2023–2026 | Farnham Town | 111 | (19) |
| 2026 | Bracknell Town | 12 | (2) |
- * Club domestic league appearances and goals as of 22:10, 16 November 2026 (UTC)

Harry Edward Cooksley (born 15 November 1994) is an English professional footballer who plays as a midfielder.

Cooksley previously played for Limestone College in NCAA Division II, St. John's University in NCAA Division I as well as senior football for Aldershot Town, AFC Wimbledon, Farnborough, Hartley Wintney and most recently, Farnham Town.

== Career ==
Cooksley joined the Academy of Football League Championship side Reading at the age of eight and progressed through the youth system of The Royals up until his release at the age of sixteen, at which point he joined the Academy of Queens Park Rangers. Following his release from QPR in January 2012, he joined the Academy of Football League One side Brentford on trial, but was ultimately unsuccessful in his pursuit to earn a contract with The Bees. However, on 10 August 2012, he was able to sign his first professional contract with Football League Two side Aldershot Town on a one–year deal.

The 17–year–old midfielder made his league debut for Aldershot Town on 18 August 2012 in a 2–0 victory over Plymouth Argyle as an injury time substitute for Josh Payne, in what would prove to be his first and last appearance for the club. Aldershot Town struggled throughout the season and were eventually relegated to the Conference National after finishing 24th in the league. On 1 May 2013 it was revealed that the club had failed to pay players their wages for the previous month. On 2 May 2013 Aldershot entered administration. On 16 May 2013, the administrators of Aldershot Town, Quantuma Restructuring, were forced to make 13 players redundant. Thus with the club in a state of financial turmoil and the possibility of a new contract rendered unfeasible, Cooksley left Aldershot Town.

The 18–year–old midfielder subsequently joined League Two side AFC Wimbledon on trial, making his first appearance for the Development squad in a 2–1 win over Portsmouth on 13 August 2013. On 19 September 2013 it was announced that Cooksley had signed a professional one–year contract with The Dons after impressing during his month on trial.

After four years playing college soccer in America, Cooksley signed for Segunda División B side Mallorca. Cooksley made three appearances for the club's B team in the Tercera División during his time with the club.

In January 2019, Cooksley joined Southern League Premier Division South club Farnborough and was subsequently sent out on a short-term loan deal to Combined Counties Premier Division side Badshot Lea. He returned to his parent club a month later and went on to make 12 appearances, scoring once.

In July 2019, Cooksley joined Austrian Regionalliga club Pinzgau Saalfelden. In December 2020 was released by Austrian side Pinzgau.

On 6 June 2021, it was announced that Cooksley would return to Farnborough ahead of the 2021–22 campaign. Cooksley later joined league rivals, Hartley Wintney in January 2022 on loan. On 29 May 2022, it was announced that Cooksley would leave the club at the end of his contract in June.

On 11 June 2022, Cooksley agreed to return to Hartley Wintney following his release from Farnborough. Upon his arrival he was appointed club captain.

On 27 May 2023, Cooksley made the switch to Combined Counties League Premier Division South side, Farnham Town ahead of the 2023–24 campaign. Throughout that season, Cooksley was a mainstay in the Farnham Town side that broke the British football record for most consecutive wins to start a league campaign (25), appearing in all 38 league games that season as the Town secured the league title and promotion to the Isthmian League South Central Division without defeat, scoring 14 goals along the way. Cooksley continued with Farnham Town for the 2024–25 season following their promotion, and enjoyed more success, appearing 40 times in the Isthmian League South Central Division en route to their clinching of back-to-back promotions. On 29 June 2026, it was announced that Cooksley would leave the club, despite signing a new contract in May for the club's debut season in the National League South after three successive promotions. He left Farnham Town after making over 130 appearances and scoring 23 goals during his three-year spell at the club.

On 8 August 2026, Cooksley agreed to join Southern League Premier Division South side, Bracknell Town following his departure from Farnham Town. A few days later, he went onto score on his debut during a 3–2 victory over Gloucester City. Cooksley left the Robins by mutual consent in November 2026.

== Reality television ==
On 3 June 2025, Cooksley was announced as a contestant on the twelfth series of the ITV2 dating show, Love Island. He made it to the finale alongside Shakira Khan, where they finished as runner-up.

Love Island Series 12 Final Voting Results
| Place | Couple | Vote Share |
|---|---|---|
| Winner | Toni & Cach | 33.5% |
| Runner-up | Shakira & Harry | 26.2% |
| Third place | Yasmin & Jamie | 22.0% |
| Fourth place | Angel & Ty | 18.3% |

== Career statistics ==
As of match played 3 November 2026

Appearances and goals by club, season and competition
| Club | Season | League | | | National Cup | | League Cup | | Other | | Total | |
| Club | Season | Division | Apps | Goals | Apps | Goals | Apps | Goals | Apps | Goals | Apps | Goals |
|---|---|---|---|---|---|---|---|---|---|---|---|---|
| Aldershot Town | 2012–13 | League Two | 1 | 0 | 0 | 0 | 0 | 0 | 0 | 0 | 1 | 0 |
| AFC Wimbledon | 2013–14 | League Two | 0 | 0 | 0 | 0 | 0 | 0 | 0 | 0 | 0 | 0 |
| Mallorca B | 2017–18 | 3ª – Group 11 | 3 | 0 | — | | — | | — | | 3 | 0 |
| Farnborough | 2018–19 | Southern League Premier Division South | 12 | 1 | — | | — | | — | | 12 | 1 |
| Badshot Lea (loan) | 2018–19 | Combined Counties League Premier Division | 4 | 1 | — | | — | | — | | 4 | 1 |
| Pinzgau Saalfelden | 2019–20 | Austrian Regionalliga Salzburg | 17 | 8 | — | | — | | — | | 17 | 8 |
| Pinzgau Saalfelden | 2020–21 | Austrian Regionalliga Salzburg | 10 | 2 | — | | — | | — | | 10 | 2 |
| Pinzgau Saalfelden | Total | | 27 | 10 | — | | — | | — | | 27 | 10 |
| Farnborough | 2021–22 | Southern League Premier Division South | 7 | 0 | 0 | 0 | — | | 3 (Note: Appearances in the FA Trophy) | 1 | 10 | 1 |
| Hartley Wintney (loan) | 2021–22 | Southern League Premier Division South | 15 | 3 | — | | — | | — | | 15 | 3 |
| Hartley Wintney | 2022–23 | Southern League Premier Division South | 24 | 8 | 3 | 0 | — | | 0 | 0 | 27 | 8 |
| Farnham Town | 2023–24 | Combined Counties League Premier Division South | 38 | 14 | 3 | 0 | — | | 5 (Note: Appearances in the FA Vase) | 2 | 46 | 16 |
| Farnham Town | 2024–25 | Isthmian League South Central Division | 40 | 4 | 2 | 0 | — | | 2 | 1 | 44 | 5 |
| Farnham Town | 2025–26 | Southern League Premier Division South | 33 | 1 | 4 | 0 | — | | 5 (Note: Three appearances in the FA Trophy, two in the Southern League Premier Division South) | 1 | 42 | 2 |
| Farnham Town | Total | | 111 | 19 | 9 | 0 | — | | 12 | 4 | 132 | 23 |
| Bracknell Town | 2026–27 | Southern League Premier Division South | 12 | 2 | 1 | 0 | — | | 0 | 0 | 13 | 2 |
| Career total | | | 216 | 44 | 13 | 0 | 0 | 0 | 15 | 5 | 244 | 49 |

== Honours ==
Farnham Town

- Combined Counties League Premier Division South: 2023–24
- Isthmian League South Central Division: 2024–25
- Surrey Senior Cup: 2025–26
- Southern League Premier Division South play-offs: 2025–26
