= Love Island: The Debrief =

British television aftershow

- Genre: Aftershow; vodcast
- Presented by: Shakira Khan; Toni Laites; Yasmin Pettet
- Music by: Lewis Hazzard; A-Mnemonic
- Country of origin: United Kingdom
- Original language: English
- No. of series: 1
- No. of episodes: 33

Production
- Executive producers: Lewis Evans; Justin Saculles
- Production location: Elstree Studios
- Editor: Gordon Barrance
- Running time: 30 minutes (incl. adverts)
- Production companies: Lifted Entertainment; Motion Content Group

Original release
- Network: ITV2
- Release: 1 June 2026 – present

Related
- Love Island; Love Island: Aftersun

Love Island: The Debrief is a British television aftershow that discusses episodes and events regarding that of its main series, Love Island. It airs following episodes of the main series and is formatted as a visual podcast. Having aired on ITV2 since 2026 for the thirteenth series of Love Island, it is presented by former contestants Shakira Khan, Toni Laites and Yasmin Pettet.

== History ==
From 2018 to 2025, the ITV2 dating reality series Love Island was accompanied by an online podcast, Love Island: The Morning After. The podcast saw various presenting line-ups throughout its tenure and was cancelled in 2026 after final hosts Amy Hart and Indiyah Polack announced they were quitting the series. It was then announced ahead of the thirteenth series of Love Island that The Morning After had been replaced by The Debrief. Still filmed as a visual podcast, the series airs on weeknights following episodes of the main series. It marked the first time Love Island's podcast spin-off had aired on linear television.

The Debrief is presented by former contestants Shakira Khan, Toni Laites and Yasmin Pettet, all of whom appeared on the twelfth series of the main programme and became "fan favourites". Speaking on their casting, Laites said that it was the perfect opportunity for the trio since with each Love Island episode, there would "automatically something to talk about every day". She added that despite the trio being close friends, they never tend to agree on things, especially dating and as a result, would each bring different opinions to the series. Ahead of the launch of the series, it was stated that viewers could expect "villa gossip, hot takes [and] chaotic group chat energy". Producers of the Love Island franchise confirmed that Khan, Laites and Pettet would be interviewing the dumped contestants.

== Episodes ==
=== Series 1 ===
| No. overall | No. in series | Title | Original release date | UK viewers (millions) |
|---|---|---|---|---|
| 1 | 1 | "Episode 1" | 1 June 2026 | 0.37 |
| 2 | 2 | "Episode 2" | 2 June 2026 | 0.24 |
| 3 | 3 | "Episode 3" | 3 June 2026 | 0.19 |
| 4 | 4 | "Episode 4" | 4 June 2026 | 0.19 |
| 5 | 5 | "Episode 5" | 5 June 2026 | 0.20 |
| 6 | 6 | "Episode 6" | 8 June 2026 | N/A |
| 7 | 7 | "Episode 7" | 9 June 2026 | N/A |
| 8 | 8 | "Episode 8" | 10 June 2026 | N/A |
| 9 | 9 | "Episode 9" | 11 June 2026 | N/A |
| 10 | 10 | "Episode 10" | 12 June 2026 | N/A |
| 11 | 11 | "Episode 11" | 15 June 2026 | N/A |
| 12 | 12 | "Episode 12" | 16 June 2026 | N/A |
| 13 | 13 | "Episode 13" | 17 June 2026 | N/A |
| 14 | 14 | "Episode 14" | 18 June 2026 | N/A |
| 15 | 15 | "Episode 15" | 19 June 2026 | N/A |
| 16 | 16 | "Episode 16" | 22 June 2026 | N/A |
| 17 | 17 | "Episode 17" | 23 June 2026 | N/A |
| 18 | 18 | "Episode 18" | 24 June 2026 | N/A |
| 19 | 19 | "Episode 19" | 25 June 2026 | N/A |
| 20 | 20 | "Episode 20" | 26 June 2026 | N/A |
| 21 | 21 | "Episode 21" | 29 June 2026 | N/A |
| 22 | 22 | "Episode 22" | 30 June 2026 | N/A |
| 23 | 23 | "Episode 23" | 1 July 2026 | N/A |
| 24 | 24 | "Episode 24" | 2 July 2026 | N/A |
| 25 | 25 | "Episode 25" | 3 July 2026 | N/A |
| 26 | 26 | "Episode 26" | 6 July 2026 | N/A |
| 27 | 27 | "Episode 27" | 7 July 2026 | N/A |
| 28 | 28 | "Episode 28" | 8 July 2026 | N/A |
| 29 | 29 | "Episode 29" | 9 July 2026 | N/A |
| 30 | 30 | "Episode 30" | 10 July 2026 | N/A |
| 31 | 31 | "Episode 31" | 13 July 2026 | N/A |
| 32 | 32 | "Episode 32" | 14 July 2026 | TBD |
| 33 | 33 | "Episode 33" | 15 July 2026 | TBD |
| 34 | 34 | "Episode 34" | 16 July 2026 | TBD |
| 35 | 35 | "Episode 35" | 17 July 2026 | TBD |
| 36 | 36 | "Episode 36" | 20 July 2026 | TBD |
| 37 | 37 | "Episode 37" | 21 July 2026 | TBD |
| 38 | 38 | "Episode 38" | 22 July 2026 | TBD |
| 39 | 39 | "Episode 39" | 23 July 2026 | TBD |
| 40 | 40 | "Episode 40" | 24 July 2026 | TBD |

== Ratings ==
Official ratings are taken from Thinkbox. Viewing figures are consolidated 7-day viewing figures with pre-broadcast viewing and viewing on tablets, PCs and smartphones included.

| | Viewers (millions) | | | | | | | |
| | Week 1 | Week 2 | Week 3 | Week 4 | Week 5 | Week 6 | Week 7 | Week 8 |
|---|---|---|---|---|---|---|---|---|
| Monday | 0.37 | 0.19 | 0.14 | —N/a | 0.17 | 0.20 | 0.25 | 0.18 |
| Tuesday | 0.24 | 0.22 | 0.16 | —N/a | 0.19 | 0.17 | 0.22 | 0.20 |
| Wednesday | 0.19 | 0.20 | 0.12 | —N/a | 0.25 | 0.22 | 0.13 | 0.20 |
| Thursday | 0.19 | 0.17 | 0.22 | —N/a | 0.20 | 0.15 | 0.20 | 0.24 |
| Friday | 0.20 | 0.21 | 0.17 | —N/a | 0.21 | 0.21 | 0.20 | 0.20 |
| Weekly average | 0.24 | 0.20 | 0.16 | —N/a | 0.20 | 0.19 | 0.20 | 0.20 |
| Running average | 0.24 | 0.22 | 0.20 | 0.20 | 0.20 | 0.20 | 0.20 | 0.20 |
| Series average | 0.20 | | | | | | | |
