= The Box (2026 game show) =

British TV game show

- Genre: Game show
- Created by: Aleksander Herresthal
- Presented by: Gary Lineker
- Country of origin: United Kingdom
- Original language: English
- No. of series: 1
- No. of episodes: 8

Production
- Running time: 60–75 minutes
- Production company: Twofour

Original release
- Network: ITV
- Release: 5 September 2026 – present

The Box is a British game show airing on ITV since 5 September 2026. Presented by Gary Lineker, the series sees ten celebrity contestants locked in yellow containers and released to face physical and mental challenges, with little instruction. After a duel between two losing contestants, one contestant is eliminated at the end of each episode. The series received mixed reviews, with reviewers criticising the format's lack of instruction and the limited involvement of Lineker.

== Background ==
The Box was created by Aleksander Herresthal of Norwegian company Seefood TV, and was first presented at the MIPCOM trade show in Cannes in October 2024. It was first broadcast on 9 January 2025 on Norway's TV 2 Direkte. Unusually for a game show, the concept was sold to other countries before its initial broadcast; Herresthal said that it had been sold to five countries and negotiations existed in 20 others by that point. In February 2025, ITV acquired the British rights and sought out a production company. The tender was won by Twofour in April 2025.

In August 2025, it was announced that The Box in the UK would be presented by Gary Lineker in his first role since leaving the BBC's Match of the Day in May 2025. In September 2025, the ten contestants were announced: Joey Essex, John Bercow, Jenny Ryan, JB Gill, Danny Aarons, Ranvir Singh, Sara Davies, Graeme Souness, Ellie Taylor and Shakira Khan.

The show was filmed in the UK in late 2025 and was announced to be broadcast the following year. It was scheduled for April to June 2026, alongside Britain's Got Talent and prior to the 2026 FIFA World Cup, but this slot was instead taken by Celebrity Sabotage, and The Box was delayed. Lineker made a surprise appearance at ITV's coverage of the World Cup to promote the series. On 14 August, the debut date was set for 5 September. It was later revealed that the series had been re-edited, with all but one episode cut down to fit a 60 minute timeslot. Additionally, the show would be broadcast on Saturday and Sunday for its first two weekends, before changing to Sunday only as a way to avoid competition with Strictly Come Dancing.

== Format ==
Celebrities are packed in yellow boxes and sent to different locations, where they face physical and mental challenges. In the majority of cases, the contestants are given limited instructions on what they need to do to complete the challenges and must figure the goal out themselves by using clues provided at the locations.

Each episode typically features three distinct challenges; an Individual challenge, a Team challenge and a Duel. The Individual challenge is a free-for-all between all the celebrities, with the winner gaining immunity from the Duel. In the Team challenge, the bottom-two placed contestants of the Individual challenge are assigned as team captains and recruit the remaining celebrities into their teams, which may also involve a "Mystery Box" competitor if the teams are uneven. The winning team all gain immunity, whilst the losing team captain competes in the Duel against another celebrity chosen by the winning team. The loser of the Duel is eliminated from the competition.

In Episode 5, the rules were changed so that only the winning captain of the Team challenge would gain immunity from the Duel. Starting from Episode 6, Team challenges were removed, and the winner of the first Individual challenge would get an advantage in the second challenge, whilst also giving another contestant a disadvantage.

== Contestants ==
Celebrity	Notability	Status
JB Gill	JLS singer & television presenter	Winner (Episode 8)
Joey Essex	Television personality	Runner-up (Episode 8)
Ranvir Singh	Good Morning Britain presenter & journalist	Eliminated (Episode 8)
Shakira Khan	Love Island finalist	Eliminated (Episode 7)
Danny Aarons	YouTube personality	Eliminated (Episode 6)
Ellie Taylor	Comedian, actress & television presenter	Eliminated (Episode 5)
Graeme Souness	Former Scotland footballer	Withdrew (Episode 5) (Note: Graeme was previously eliminated in episode 1. In episode 4, Joey had the chance to bring back either Graeme or Sara, and choose Graeme to return.)
Jenny Ryan	The Chase quizzer	Eliminated (Episode 4)
John Bercow	Former Speaker of the House of Commons	Eliminated (Episode 3)
Sara Davies	Dragons' Den investor & businesswoman	Eliminated (Episode 2)

== Episodes ==
=== Episode progress ===
Contestants	Episodes							
Contestants	1	2	3	4	5	6	7	8
JB	WIN	SAFE	WIN	SAFE	WIN	WIN	DUEL	WINNER
Joey	SAFE	DUEL	WIN	WIN	SAFE	DUEL	WIN	RUNNER-UP
Ranvir	WIN	WIN	WIN	DUEL	SAFE	WIN	SAFE	OUT
Shakira	WIN	WIN	DUEL	WIN	SAFE	DUEL	OUT	
Danny	DUEL	SAFE	WIN	WIN	DUEL	OUT		
Ellie	WIN	WIN	SAFE	WIN	OUT			
Graeme	OUT			RTRN	OUT			
Jenny	SAFE	WIN	WIN	OUT				
John	SAFE	WIN	OUT					
Sara	WIN	OUT						

Competition key
The contestant won The Box
The contestant was the runner up on The Box
The contestant won the individual challenge and was immune
The contestant was selected to return to the game and was immune
The contestant was on the winning team and was safe
The contestant was on the losing team and not selected for the Duel
The contestant won the elimination in the Duel
The contestant withdrew from the competition
The contestant won the individual challenge and the team challenge but lost in the Duel and was eliminated
The contestant lost in the Duel and was eliminated

=== Challenges ===
==== Episode 1 ====
Challenge	Task	Winner(s)	Loser(s)
Individual	The celebrities are tasked with finding ten hidden tokens and placing them in a central table with ten numbered slots. The numbers dictate the celebrities' finishing positions, not the order they place them in.	Ranvir	Graeme, JB
Team	The celebrities have ten minutes to carry an egg on a spoon as far away from a wall as possible. The distance is not counted if the egg is dropped or held on the spoon, or if the celebrities don't make it back to their box within the time limit	JB, Sara, Shakira, Ellie, Ranvir	Graeme, Danny, Joey, Jenny, John
Duel	The celebrities play a three-round game of Rock, Paper, Scissors. In each round, one celebrity will pick an object and tell their opponent what it is. The opponent must then decide if they are bluffing or not.	Danny	Graeme

==== Episode 2 ====
- Mystery Box competitor: Peter Andre

Challenge	Task	Winner(s)	Loser(s)
Individual	The celebrities must sit down on a chair for as long as possible until a timer runs out. If a celebrity leaves their chair at any point, their time is reset	Shakira	John, Joey
Team	The celebrities perform a musical number at a Butlin's resort.	John, Ellie, Jenny, Ranvir, Shakira	Joey, Danny, JB, Sara, Peter
Duel	The celebrities take turns to get a ball through a tilt-maze whilst avoiding holes in the floor. If they succeed, play is passed on to their opponent. Each competitor has a timer that depletes whilst they are in control of the maze, and the first celebrity to have their timer expire loses.	Joey	Sara

==== Episode 3 ====
Challenge	Task	Winner(s)	Loser(s)
Individual	The celebrities are split into pairs and participate in a debate at the Oxford Union.	Ranvir	John, Danny
Team	The celebrities are split into pairs and are tasked with completing the longest table tennis rally possible within two minutes, with the total score of each pair being added for their respective teams. In order to participate in the challenge, they must first obtain the rackets, one of which is tied to a buoy in the sea, whilst the other is suspended over the Brighton i360.	Danny, Jenny, Joey, JB	John, Ellie, Ranvir, Shakira
Duel	The celebrities play Spot the Difference with a group of dancers. The first player to make three incorrect guesses is eliminated.	Shakira	John

==== Episode 4 ====
Challenge	Task	Winner(s)	Loser(s)
Individual	The celebrities must find and answer a series of telephones. Only the first celebrity to answer each telephone may use it, where they may be given a series of random instructions. Amongst the instructions provided are assigning the captains for the team challenge and selecting a previously eliminated celebrity to rejoin the game with immunity from the Duel.	N/A, Graeme returned.	Ranvir, Danny
Team	The celebrities are split into pairs and participate in a football match. Instead of scoring the most goals, the aim is to commit a yellow card offense as quickly as possible. The team with the fastest combined time wins.	Danny, Ellie, Joey, Shakira	Ranvir, Graeme, Jenny, JB
Duel	The celebrities compete on a giant Buzz Wire course and are tasked with removing a tag off of their opponent. If their ring touches the wire, they incur a 10 second time penalty.	Ranvir	Jenny

==== Episode 5 ====
- Mystery Box competitor: Tom Allen

Challenge	Task	Winner(s)	Loser(s)
Individual	The celebrities play a game of Sardines inside a haunted mansion. Unlike previous episodes, the winner of the challenge does not win immunity.	Ellie	Danny, JB
Team	The celebrities participate in three speed dates and have to get their chosen dates to answer as many questions about themselves as possible. Only the winning captain gains immunity.	JB, Ellie, Shakira	Danny, Joey, Ranvir, Tom
Duel	The celebrities are tasked with picking three categories each that best describe themselves, based on a poll their opponents took on them prior to the duel. The results are added to a wheel, which is then spun to determine who stays in the game.	Danny	Ellie

==== Episode 6 ====
Challenge	Task	Winner(s)	Loser(s)
Individual 1	The celebrities attempt to stack a tower of blocks of their designated colour in a warehouse where the lights periodically go out.	JB	Shakira (disadvantaged)
Individual 2	The celebrities take a test at a primary school on a subject of their choosing. The subjects are determined in order of placement of the previous challenge, with that challenge's winner getting to pick another celebrity's subject as a disadvantage.	JB, Ranvir	Danny, Joey, Shakira
Duel	The celebrities take turn inflating a balloon. The first to make the balloon pop is eliminated.	Joey, Shakira	Danny

==== Episode 7 ====
Challenge	Task	Winner(s)	Loser(s)
Individual 1	The celebrities have twenty minutes to form the largest conga line they possibly can. They then take part in a series of events with assistance from their conga line participants, with the winner of each round getting to eliminate an opponent of their choosing.	Ranvir	JB (disadvantaged)
Individual 2	The celebrities have to take one of three rugby balls down the pitch as far as they can whilst being chased by a team of players. The celebrity chosen by the previous round's winner to get the disadvantage competes in a chicken costume.	Joey	JB
Duel	The celebrities have to create a line on a grid using a series of tokens, which they must retrieve from a narrow container. The first to place five tokens in a row wins, but the players can also block their opponents.	JB	Shakira

==== Episode 8 ====
Challenge	Task	Winner(s)	Loser(s)
Individual 1	The celebrities are placed on a London tour boat and have to push a button that is locked inside a box. The code for the locks is represented by a certain number of colour-coded items the tourists are wearing.	JB	Joey, Ranvir
Individual 2	The celebrities are paired up with an eliminated contestant of their choice, with the order of the previous challenge determining who gets to pick first. They must work together to determine a specific task, which is identified by throwing basketballs through a hoop to unlock clues. The competitor who figures out and performs the designated task in the slowest time is eliminated.	Joey and Danny, JB and Shakira	Ranvir and Ellie
Duel	The celebrities are given 100 marbles and must place as many as they can in a box so that the total amount weighs more than their opponent's box. The Duel consists of five rounds and the marbles are not replenished at the start of each round. The first competitor to win three rounds is the champion.	JB	Joey

== Reception ==
=== Critical reception ===
The Box received three-star reviews from Sarah Dempster in The Guardian and Anita Singh in The Daily Telegraph, a two-star review from Katie Rosseinsky in The Independent, and a half-star review from Patrick Stacey in the Irish Independent. Several reviews found the series to be entertaining, and some found the contestants' shared living space and discussions on who to eliminate to resemble The Traitors, both positively and negatively. A criticism by several reviewers was that the show's format, in which the contestants are given tasks without being given instructions, was difficult to follow; Dempster and Rosseinsky compared it negatively to Taskmaster. A frequent observation by critics was that this format meant that Lineker had little involvement, and that his level-headed presenting style was not a match with the programme. Stacey called it "genuinely one of the worst things I've ever clapped eyes on" and believed that Lineker was following Bruce Forsyth and Morecambe and Wise by moving from the BBC to an inferior programme on ITV.

=== Ratings ===
The first episode received an audience of 2,253,900, making it the 15th most watched ITV programme of the week, and 47th overall. From its fourth episode onwards, it fell out of the top 50.
