= Julia Majchrzak =

Polish television personality (born 2000)

- Born: Julia Karolina Majchrzak; 25 April 2000 (age 26); Poland
- Citizenship: Poland; United Kingdom
- Occupation: Television personality
- Years active: 2026–present

Julia Karolina Majchrzak (Polish pronunciation: [ˈjulja ka.rɔˈli.na ˈmai̯xʂak]; is a Polish television personality and model, known for appearing on, and winning the thirteenth series of Love Island in 2026, which she won with her partner Lorenzo Alessi.

== Early and personal life ==
Julia Karolina Majchrzak was born in Poland on 25 April 2000. She eventually moved to London, where she worked as an insurance broker. On 20 August 2026, Majchrzak announced via her social media channels that she had obtained British citizenship.

== Career ==
In June 2026, it was confirmed that she had been cast as a contestant on the thirteenth series of the ITV2 dating reality television series Love Island. She entered the villa as one of the "Casa Amor" bombshells halfway through the series. Majchrzak then coupled up with Lorenzo Alessi. During her time on the show, she had disagreements with various fellow contestants including Jasmine Müller, Lola Deal and Priya Jaswal. Majchrzak was involved in numerous arguments and dramatic situations. She and Alessi were crowned the winners on 27 July 2026. Alessi and Majchrzak broke up one month later.

== Filmography ==
As herself
Year	Title	Notes	Ref.
2026	Love Island	Winner; series 13	
2026	This Morning	Guest; 1 episode	
2026	The 6 O'Clock Show	Guest; 1 episode	
