= Cach Mercer =

English media personality (born 2001)

- Mercer at Television BAFTAs 2026
- Born: Cacherel Damani Mirjah Mercer; 28 February 2001 (age 25); Islington, London, England
- Occupations: Television personality; dancer; model
- Years active: 2025-present

Cacherel Damani Mirjah Mercer (born 28 February 2001) is a British television personality, dancer and model. After appearing on the MTV reality series Are You the One? UK and amassing a following on TikTok, he won the twelfth series of Love Island in 2025 and is a contestant on the twenty-fourth series of Strictly Come Dancing in 2026.

== Life and career ==
Cacherel Damani Mirjah Mercer was born on 28 February 2001 in Islington, London. He is of Caribbean heritage, with his mother being of Grenadian and Jamaican descent, whilst his father is of Saint Kitts and Nevis and Antiguan descent. He has a brother, D'Shae and a sister, Ayjah. Prior to appearing on television, Mercer worked as a professional dancer, specialising in Hip Hop and Afrobeats, regularly posting videos dancing on his TikTok account, of which he has amassed over a million followers. He has also worked as model. In 2022, Mercer appeared on the British version of the MTV reality series Are You the One?.

In July 2025, Mercer was announced as one of the Casa Amor "bombshells" on the twelfth series of the ITV2 dating series Love Island. He coupled up with Toni Laites after she chose him during a recoupling. Laites later recoupled with someone else, whilst Mercer coupled up with Emma Munro. Mercer and Laites subsequently reunited and went on to win the series with 33.5% of the vote. Mercer made subsequent appearances on This Morning alongside his Love Island co-stars and became an ambassador for the mental health charity YoungMinds. Mercer and Laites continued their relationship outside of the villa until splitting in March 2026.

In July 2026, Mercer was announced as a contestant on the twenty-fourth series of Strictly Come Dancing. On joining the show, Mercer said: "I have grown up watching the show with my family and am so excited to now be part of the cast. Dancing is a huge passion of mine and I can’t wait to learn Ballroom and do the Foxtrot for the first time!".

== Filmography ==
As himself
| Year | Title | Notes | Ref. |
|---|---|---|---|
| 2022 | Are You the One? UK | Contestant | |
| 2025 | Love Island | Winner; series 12 | |
| 2025 | This Morning | Guest; 1 episode | |
| 2025 | Good Morning Britain | Guest; 1 episode | |
| 2026 | Strictly Come Dancing | Contestant; series 24 | |
