= Shakira Khan =

English television personality (born 2002)

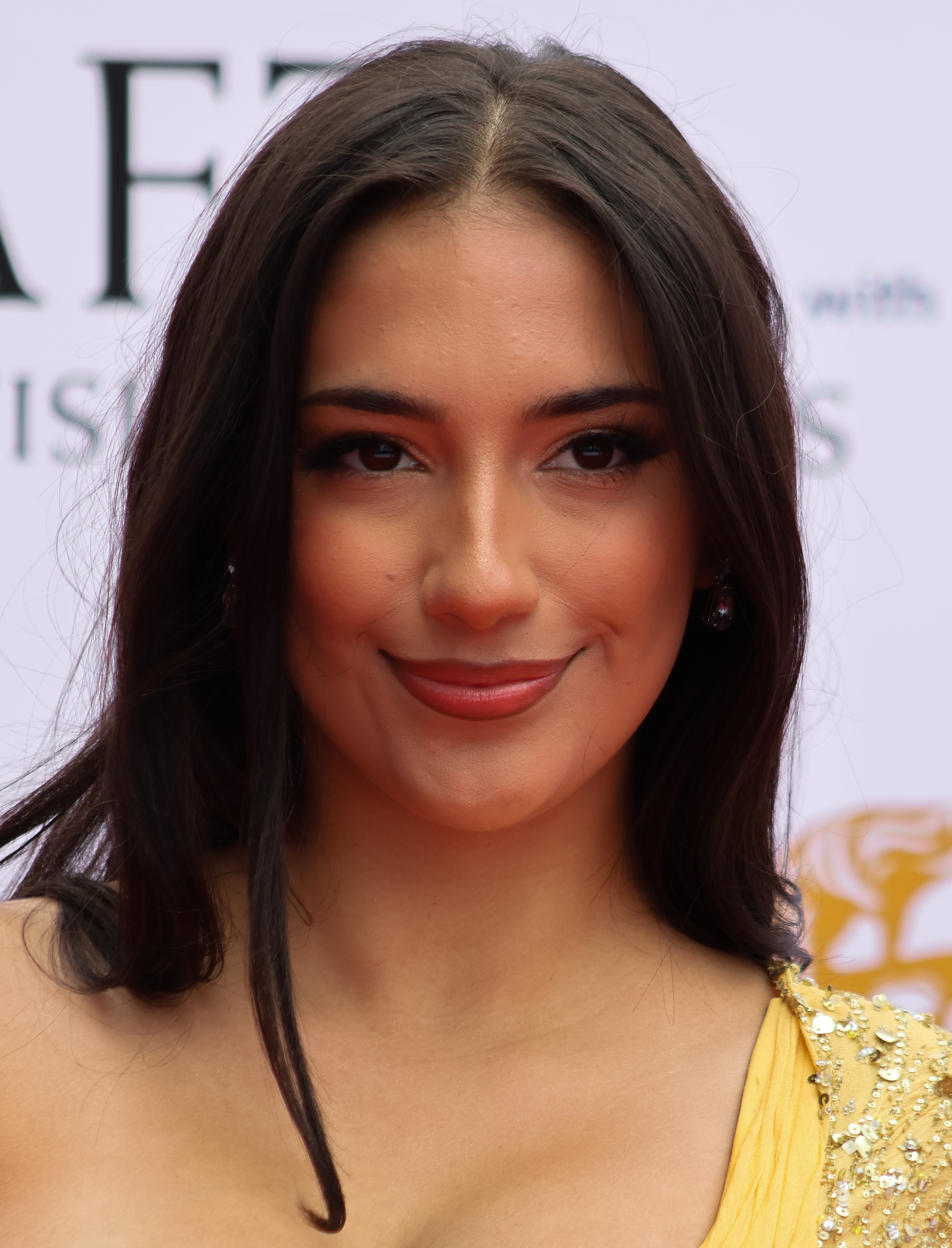
- Khan in 2026
- Born: 16 December 2002 (age 23); Burnley, Lancashire, England
- Education: Blessed Trinity Roman Catholic College
- Occupation: Television personality
- Television: Love Island; Love Island: The Debrief; The Box; Celebrity Masterchef

Shakira Khan (born 16 December 2002) is an English television personality, known for appearing as a contestant on the twelfth series of the ITV2 dating series Love Island in 2025. In 2026, she began fronting Love Island: The Debrief, as well as appearing as a contestant on The Box and Celebrity MasterChef.

== Life and career ==
Shakira Khan was born on 16 December 2002 in Burnley, Lancashire, and attended Blessed Trinity Roman Catholic College, where she served as head girl. She is of English and Pakistani descent. Prior to appearing on television, Khan worked as a marketing engineer, as well as a children's entertainer in which she dressed up as Disney princesses.

In June 2025, Khan was announced as a contestant on the twelfth series of the ITV2 dating show Love Island. She entered the villa on Day 1 of the series, coupling up with Ben Holbrough, before stealing Harry Cooksley the following day in a coupling twist. Throughout her time on the show, Khan went on to couple up with both Holbrough and Cooksley on further occasions, as well as Ty Isherwood and Conor Phillips, prior to reuniting with Cooksley in the final week of the series. Khan and Cooksley finished as runners-up.

In September 2025, Khan was confirmed as a contestant on ITV's upcoming game show, The Box.

In 2026, alongside fellow Love Island series 12 contestants Yasmin Pettet and Toni Laites, Khan was announced as the co-host for the new Love Island companion vodcast The Debrief. Khan also joined Love Island: Aftersun as a permanent panellist. In August 2026, Khan was a contestant on series 21 of Celebrity MasterChef.

== Filmography ==
As herself
Year	Title	Role	Notes	Ref.
2025	Love Island	Contestant	Series 12 runner-up	
2025	This Morning	Guest	1 episode	
2025	Lorraine	Guest	1 episode	
2025	Loose Women	Guest	1 episode	
2026	Love Island: Aftersun	Panellist	Main cast	
2026	Love Island: The Debrief	Co-host	Main cast	
2026	The Box	Contestant	Series 1	
2026	Celebrity MasterChef	Contestant	Series 21	
