= Love Island (2015 TV series) series 12 =

2025 series of Love Island

Love Island
- Series 12
- Promotional poster for the series
- Presented by: Maya Jama
- No. of days: 50
- No. of contestants: 38
- Winners: Toni Laites; Cach Mercer
- Runners-up: Harry Cooksley; Shakira Khan
- Companion show: Love Island: Aftersun
- No. of episodes: 57

Release
- Original network: ITV2
- Original release: 9 June – 4 August 2025

Series chronology
- ← Previous; Series 11 Next → Series 13

The twelfth series of Love Island began broadcasting on 9 June 2025 on ITV2, following a one-off special episode, Love Island: A Decade of Love, which aired a week prior, commemorating the show's 10th anniversary. Maya Jama returned to present the series, as well its spin-off Love Island: Aftersun, whilst Iain Stirling again returned as narrator.

On 4 August 2025, the series was won by Toni Laites and Cach Mercer, who received 33.5% of the public vote, with Harry Cooksley and Shakira Khan finishing as the runners-up.

== Production ==
Following the second series of the spin-off Love Island: All Stars, which aired between January and February 2025, it was confirmed that the twelfth series of Love Island would air later in the year. Alongside confirmation of the series, ITV announced that a one-off special episode Love Island: A Decade of Love, featuring former contestants reflecting on their time in the villa, would air a week prior to the series launch to commemorate the programme's 10th anniversary. Applications for the show opened whilst the eleventh series was airing the previous year. The series began on 9 June 2025 and was again being filmed in Mallorca.

The first teaser for the series aired in May 2025, and featured a printer with the Love Island logo on, printing out a piece of paper reading "Attn: Love Island is coming soon. Attendance is mandatory. Signed, Maya x CEO of Love" [sic]. A further full-length trailer aired later that month, which featured host Maya Jama and a team of production members coming up with ideas for the new series in a Love Island-themed boardroom, Jama asks the team for "something bigger and bolder", and is presented with comical answers including "moving the show to the Isle of Wight", turning it into a musical, and rebranding to "Love Island on Ice." Unimpressed by their ideas, Jama stands and teases "more drama, more bombshells, more breakups, more makeups [...] and more twists than ever."

== Islanders ==
The original islanders for the twelfth series were announced on 3 June 2025. Kyle Ashman, a 23-year-old water operative from Stafford, was initially announced for the series, however he was removed from the cast due to a legal issue that came to light prior to entering the villa. The following day, he was replaced by 25-year-old professional rugby player Conor Phillips from Limerick, who entered the villa in his place. A day before the launch, ITV confirmed 24-year-old Las Vegas Pool Cabana server Toni Laites from Connecticut, United States as the first "bombshell" of the series.

Islander	Age	Hometown	Entered	Exited	Status	Ref.
Antonia "Toni" Laites	24	Connecticut, U.S.	Day 1	Day 50	Winner	
Cacherel "Cach" Mercer	24	East London	Day 25	Day 50	Winner	
Harry Cooksley	30	Guildford	Day 1	Day 50	Runner-up	
Shakira Khan	22	Burnley	Day 1	Day 50	Runner-up	
Jamie Rhodes	26	Barking	Day 25	Day 50	Third place	
Yasmin Pettet	24	London	Day 5	Day 50	Third place	
Angelique "Angel" Swift	26	Maidstone	Day 34	Day 50	Fourth place	
Ty Isherwood	23	Barnsley	Day 25	Day 50	Fourth place	
Dejon Noel-Williams	26	Watford	Day 1	Day 48	Dumped	
Megan "Meg" Moore	25	Southampton	Day 1	Day 48	Dumped	
Conor Phillips	25	Limerick	Day 1	Day 47	Dumped	
Megan Forte Clarke	24	Dublin	Day 39 (Note: Dumped Islanders Blu and Megan re-entered the villa.)	Day 47	Re-dumped	
Megan Forte Clarke	24	Dublin	Day 1	Day 17	Dumped	
Blu Chegini	26	London	Day 39	Day 45	Re-dumped	
Blu Chegini	26	London	Day 1	Day 4	Dumped	
Helena Ford	29	London	Day 1	Day 45	Dumped	
Bilikis "Billykiss" Azeez	28	Dublin	Day 20	Day 38	Dumped	
Boris Vidović	28	Ljubljana, Slovenia	Day 25	Day 38	Dumped	
Emma Munro	30	Norwich	Day 24	Day 38	Dumped	
Harrison Solomon	22	Derby	Day 8	Day 35	Walked	
Lauren Wood	26	York	Day 24	Day 34	Dumped	
Lucy Quinn	21	Liverpool	Day 24	Day 31	Dumped	
Tommy Bradley	22	Potters Bar	Day 1	Day 31	Dumped	
Andrada Pop	27	Balbriggan	Day 24	Day 31	Dumped	
Ben Holbrough	23	Gloucester	Day 1	Day 31	Dumped	
Chris Middleton	29	Manchester	Day 25	Day 27	Dumped	
Emily Moran	24	Aberdare	Day 5	Day 27	Dumped	
Giorgio Russo	30	Maidstone	Day 13	Day 27	Dumped	
Martin Enitan	23	South London	Day 25	Day 27	Dumped	
Rheo Parnell	26	Nuneaton	Day 24	Day 27	Dumped	
Yasmin "Yaz" Broom	26	Stretford	Day 24	Day 27	Dumped	
Alima Gagigo	23	Glasgow	Day 1	Day 21	Dumped	
Ryan Bannister	27	Chesterfield	Day 20	Day 21	Dumped	
Remell Mullings	24	Essex	Day 3	Day 17	Dumped	
Caprice Alexandra	26	Romford	Day 13	Day 15	Dumped	
Poppy Harrison	22	Stoke-on-Trent	Day 13	Day 15	Dumped	
Shea Mannings	25	Bristol	Day 3	Day 15	Dumped	
Will Means	25	Terrington St Clement	Day 13	Day 15	Dumped	
Malisha Jordan	24	Broxbourne	Day 5	Day 8	Dumped	
Sophie Lee	29	Darwen	Day 1	Day 2	Dumped	

=== Future appearances ===
In 2026, Tommy Bradley, Helena Ford and Harrison Solomon all returned for series three of Love Island: All Stars.

== Coupling and elimination history ==
The couples were chosen shortly after the islanders entered the villa. The girls were given each of the boys' dating profiles listed on podiums which featured their name, age, height and a quote from them, and had to decide their couple by standing next to the podium of their choice based solely on their profiles prior to meeting them face-to-face.

	Week 1					Week 2		Week 3				Week 4		Week 5			Week 6		Week 7				Week 8
	Day 1		Day 2	Day 4		Day 8	Day 12	Day 15	Day 17	Day 18	Day 21	Day 23	Day 27	Day 31	Day 32	Day 34	Day 38	Day 42	Day 45	Day 47	Day 48		Final
Cach	Not in Villa												Toni	Safe	Emma		Billykiss to dump	Toni	Safe	Safe	Finalist		Winner (Day 50)
Toni	Not in Villa	Ben		Conor	Shea to save	Harrison	Harrison		Vulnerable	Harrison		Harrison	Cach	Safe	Harrison		Billykiss to dump	Cach	Safe	Safe	Finalist		Winner (Day 50)
Harry	Sophie		Shakira	Helena	Shea to save	Helena	Shakira		Vulnerable	Shakira		Helena	Helena	Safe	Helena		Vulnerable	Shakira	Safe	Safe	Finalist		Runner-up (Day 50)
Shakira	Ben	Single	Harry	Ben	Blu to save	Ben	Harry		Vulnerable	Harry		Ben	Ty	Lucy & Tommy to dump	Conor		Safe	Harry	Safe	Safe	Finalist		Runner-up (Day 50)
Jamie	Not in Villa												Yasmin	Safe	Yasmin		Safe	Yasmin	Safe	Safe	Finalist		Third place (Day 50)
Yasmin	Not in Villa					Shea	Ben		Safe	Giorgio		Conor	Jamie	Safe	Jamie		Billykiss to dump	Jamie	Safe	Safe	Finalist		Third place (Day 50)
Angel	Not in Villa															Ty	Vulnerable	Ty	Safe	Safe	Vulnerable	Finalist	Fourth place (Day 50)
Ty	Not in Villa												Shakira	Lucy & Tommy to dump	Lauren	Angel	Billykiss to dump	Angel	Safe	Safe	Vulnerable	Finalist	Fourth place (Day 50)
Dejon	Meg			Meg	Blu to save	Meg	Meg		Safe	Meg		Meg	Meg	Safe	Meg		Safe	Meg	Safe	Safe	Vulnerable	Eliminated	Dumped (Day 48)
Meg	Dejon			Dejon	Blu to save	Dejon	Dejon		Safe	Dejon		Dejon	Dejon	Safe	Dejon		Safe	Dejon	Safe	Safe	Vulnerable	Eliminated	Dumped (Day 48)
Conor	Helena			Toni	Shea to save	Emily	Emily		Safe	Alima	Billykiss	Yasmin	Emma	Vulnerable	Shakira		Vulnerable	Megan	Safe	Eliminated	Dumped (Day 47)		
Megan	Tommy			Tommy	Shea to save	Tommy	Tommy		Eliminated	Dumped (Day 15)								Conor	Safe	Eliminated	Re-dumped (Day 47)		
Blu	Alima			Single	Vulnerable	Dumped (Day 4)												Helena	Eliminated	Re-dumped (Day 45)	Angel & Ty to dump		Re-dumped (Day 45)
Helena	Conor			Harry	Shea to save	Harry	Shea	Giorgio	Safe	Ben		Harry	Harry	Safe	Harry		Safe	Blu	Eliminated	Dumped (Day 45)	Angel & Ty to dump		Dumped (Day 45)
Billykiss	Not in Villa										Conor	Giorgio	Boris	Safe	Boris		Vulnerable	Dumped (Day 38)			Dejon & Meg to dump		Dumped (Day 38)
Boris	Not in Villa												Billykiss	Safe	Billykiss		Eliminated	Dumped (Day 38)			Dejon & Meg to dump		Dumped (Day 38)
Emma	Not in Villa												Conor	Vulnerable	Cach		Eliminated	Dumped (Day 38)			Dejon & Meg to dump		Dumped (Day 38)
Harrison	Not in Villa					Toni	Toni		Safe	Toni		Toni	Lauren	Vulnerable	Toni		Walked (Day 35)				Angel & Ty to dump		Walked (Day 35)
Lauren	Not in Villa												Harrison	Vulnerable	Ty	Single	Dumped (Day 34)				Angel & Ty to dump		Dumped (Day 34)
Lucy	Not in Villa												Tommy	Vulnerable	Dumped (Day 31)						Angel & Ty to dump		Dumped (Day 31)
Tommy	Megan			Megan	Shea to save	Megan	Megan		Safe	Emily		Emily	Lucy	Vulnerable	Dumped (Day 31)						Angel & Ty to dump		Dumped (Day 31)
Andrada	Not in Villa												Ben	Eliminated	Dumped (Day 31)						Dejon & Meg to dump		Dumped (Day 31)
Ben	Shakira	Toni		Shakira	Blu to save	Shakira	Yasmin		Vulnerable	Helena		Shakira	Andrada	Eliminated	Dumped (Day 31)						Dejon & Meg to dump		Dumped (Day 31)
Chris	Not in Villa												Single	Dumped (Day 27)									
Emily	Not in Villa						Conor		Safe	Tommy		Tommy	Single	Dumped (Day 27)							Angel & Ty to dump		Dumped (Day 27)
Giorgio	Not in Villa							Helena	Immune	Yasmin		Billykiss	Single	Dumped (Day 27)							Angel & Ty to dump		Dumped (Day 27)
Martin	Not in Villa												Single	Dumped (Day 27)									
Rheo	Not in Villa												Single	Dumped (Day 27)									
Yaz	Not in Villa												Single	Dumped (Day 27)									
Alima	Blu			Remell	Shea to save	Remell	Remell		Safe	Conor	Single	Dumped (Day 19)									Dejon & Meg to dump		Dumped (Day 19)
Ryan	Not in Villa										Single	Dumped (Day 19)											
Remell	Not in Villa			Alima	Shea to save	Alima	Alima		Eliminated	Dumped (Day 17)											Dejon & Meg to dump		Dumped (Day 17)
Caprice	Not in Villa							Single	Dumped (Day 15)														
Poppy	Not in Villa							Single	Dumped (Day 15)														
Shea	Not in Villa			Single	Vulnerable	Yasmin	Helena	Single	Dumped (Day 15)												Dejon & Meg to dump		Dumped (Day 15)
Will	Not in Villa							Single	Dumped (Day 15)														
Malisha	Not in Villa					Single	Dumped (Day 8)														Dejon & Meg to dump		Dumped (Day 8)
Sophie	Harry		Single	Dumped (Day 2)																	Dejon & Meg to dump		Dumped (Day 2)
Notes	none	1		2		3	none	4	5	none	6	none	7	8	none	9	10	none	11	12	13		14
Walked	none																Harrison	none					
Dumped	No; Dumping		Sophie; Failed to couple up	No; Dumping	Blu; 2 of 6 votes to save	Malisha; Failed to couple up	No; Dumping	Caprice, Poppy, Shea, Will; Failed to couple up	Megan, Remell; Public's choice to dump	No; Dumping	Alima, Ryan; Failed to couple up	No; Dumping	Chris, Emily, Giorgio, Martin, Rheo; Yaz; Failed to couple up	Andrada & Ben; Public's choice to dump	No; Dumping	Lauren; Failed to couple up	Boris, Emma; Public's choice to dump	No; Dumping	Blu & Helena; Public's choice to dump	Conor & Megan; Public's choice to dump	Dejon & Meg; 10 of 18 votes to dump		Angel & Ty; 18.3% to win
Dumped	No; Dumping		Sophie; Failed to couple up	No; Dumping	Blu; 2 of 6 votes to save	Malisha; Failed to couple up	No; Dumping	Caprice, Poppy, Shea, Will; Failed to couple up	Megan, Remell; Public's choice to dump	No; Dumping	Alima, Ryan; Failed to couple up	No; Dumping	Chris, Emily, Giorgio, Martin, Rheo; Yaz; Failed to couple up	Andrada & Ben; Public's choice to dump	No; Dumping	Lauren; Failed to couple up	Boris, Emma; Public's choice to dump	No; Dumping	Blu & Helena; Public's choice to dump	Conor & Megan; Public's choice to dump	Dejon & Meg; 10 of 18 votes to dump		Jamie & Yasmin; 22% to win
Dumped	No; Dumping		Sophie; Failed to couple up	No; Dumping	Blu; 2 of 6 votes to save	Malisha; Failed to couple up	No; Dumping	Caprice, Poppy, Shea, Will; Failed to couple up	Megan, Remell; Public's choice to dump	No; Dumping	Alima, Ryan; Failed to couple up	No; Dumping	Chris, Emily, Giorgio, Martin, Rheo; Yaz; Failed to couple up	Lucy & Tommy; Shakira & Ty's choice to dump	No; Dumping	Lauren; Failed to couple up	Billykiss; Islander's choice to dump	No; Dumping	Blu & Helena; Public's choice to dump	Conor & Megan; Public's choice to dump	Dejon & Meg; 10 of 18 votes to dump		Harry & Shakira; 26.2% to win
Dumped	No; Dumping		Sophie; Failed to couple up	No; Dumping	Blu; 2 of 6 votes to save	Malisha; Failed to couple up	No; Dumping	Caprice, Poppy, Shea, Will; Failed to couple up	Megan, Remell; Public's choice to dump	No; Dumping	Alima, Ryan; Failed to couple up	No; Dumping	Chris, Emily, Giorgio, Martin, Rheo; Yaz; Failed to couple up	Lucy & Tommy; Shakira & Ty's choice to dump	No; Dumping	Lauren; Failed to couple up	Billykiss; Islander's choice to dump	No; Dumping	Blu & Helena; Public's choice to dump	Conor & Megan; Public's choice to dump	Dejon & Meg; 10 of 18 votes to dump		Cach & Toni; 33.5% to win

=== Notes ===
- ^Note 1: Toni arrived after the coupling on Day 1 but was told she would be able to steal a boy for herself. She picked Ben, leaving Shakira single. She had until Day 2 to find another boy to couple up with, or else she would dumped. Shakira subsequently recoupled with Harry, leaving Sophie dumped from the villa.
- ^Note 2: Blu and Shea were left single following a recoupling on Day 4. The two of them had to decide which one would stay single in the villa and which would be dumped from the island. After not being able to come to a decision, the islanders chose to dump Blu from the island.
- ^Note 3: Malisha and Toni were left single following the recoupling and had the chance to date new bombshell Harrison. He was able to choose which girl to bring back to the villa. He ultimately chose Toni, leaving Malisha dumped.
- ^Note 4: Caprice, Giorgio, Poppy, and Will entered the villa on Day 13 and chose, Dejon, Emily, Helena, and Remell for a sleepover. On Day 15, the four islanders had to decide if they wanted to couple up with one of the bombshells or return to the villa and remain coupled up with their original partner. Helena chose to recouple with Giorgio, while Dejon, Emily, and Remell decided to remain coupled up with Meg, Conor, and Alima, respectively. Caprice, Poppy, Shea, and Will were all dumped from the island as a result.
- ^Note 5: On Day 17, the public voted for their favourite boy and girl. The islanders with the fewest votes were immediately dumped from the island.
- ^Note 6: The islanders were given the chance to leave their current couple and recouple with new islanders Billykiss and Ryan. As Conor recoupled with Billykiss and no girl coupled up with Ryan, Alima and Ryan were left single and dumped from the island.
- ^Note 7: Original islanders were only given the option to remain in their current couple, or re-couple with one of the new islanders.
- ^Note 8: On Day 31, after receiving the fewest public votes for least compatible couple, Andrada & Ben were immediately dumped from the island. Lauren & Harrison, Emma & Conor, and Lucy ^ Tommy were the remaining couples who received the fewest votes and were at risk of being dumped. It was then down to Shakira & Ty, who had received the most public votes, to decide which couple to dump. They chose Lucy & Tommy
- ^Note 9: Angel entered the villa on Day 38 and ranked her top three boys. She ranked Ty number one, resulting in them being officially coupled up. As a result, Lauren was left single and dumped from the island.
- ^Note 10: On Day 38, the public voted for their favorite girl and their favorite boy. Toni and Yasmin, and Cach and Ty received the most votes. The bottom three girls were revealed to be Billykiss, Emma, and Angel, while the bottom three boys were Boris, Conor, and Harry. Since Emma and Boris received the fewest votes, they were dumped from the island immediately. As there were seven girls and six boys remaining in the villa, Billykiss and Angel were at risk of being dumped. As they were voted the favorite islanders, Cach, Toni, Ty, and Yasmin had to decide which girl to dump. They ultimately chose to dump Billykiss from the island.
- ^Note 11: On Day 45, following a public vote for their favourite couple, Blu and Helena received the fewest votes and were dumped from the island.
- ^Note 12: On Day 47, following a public vote, Megan and Conor were voted as the least compatible couple.
- ^Note 13: On Day 48, following a vote for the public's favorite couple, Meg and Dejon, and Angel and Ty received the fewest votes and were at risk of being dumped from the island. Dumped islanders returned to the villa to decide which of the two couples was the least compatible and would be dumped from the island. Blu, Tommy, Lucy, Harrison, Emily, Lauren, Giorgio, and Helena voted for Angel and Ty, whilst Sophie, Shea, Remell, Ben, Alima, Boris, Malisha, Emma, Andrada, and Billykiss all voted for Meg and Dejon. Since Meg and Dejon received the most votes, they were dumped from the island.
- ^Note 14: The public voted for which couple they think should win Love Island. The couple with the most votes were declared the winner of Love Island and received the grand prize money.

== Weekly summary ==
The main events in the Love Island villa are summarized in the table below.

Week 1	Entrances	On Day 1, Alima, Ben, Blu, Conor, Dejon, Harry, Helena, Meg, Megan, Shakira, Sophie and Tommy entered the villa. Toni entered the villa as the first bombshell the same evening.; On Day 3, Remell and Shea entered the villa.; On Day 5, Emily, Malisha, and Yasmin entered the villa.
Week 1	Coupling	On Day 1, the girls were given each of the boys' dating profiles listed on podiums which featured their name, age, height, and a quote from them. The girls had to decide their couple by standing next to the podium of their choice based solely on their profiles. They were determined as follows; Ben was paired with Shakira, Dejon with Meg, Conor with Helena, Harry with Sophie, Blu with Alima, and Tommy with Megan. After Toni entered the villa that evening, she was able to steal a boy of her choice. She stole Ben, leaving Shakira single. Shakira was told she had until the following night to ensure she was coupled up with another boy otherwise she would be dumped, however, if she was able to couple up, whichever girl was left single would be dumped from the villa instead.; On Day 2, each of the boys was asked to stand if they wished to recouple with Shakira. Blu, Conor, and Harry did so, leaving Alima, Helena, and Sophie at risk of being dumped. Shakira subsequently chose to recouple with Harry, leaving Sophie single and therefore dumped from the villa.; On Day 4, the islanders recoupled for the first time with the girls choosing who they would like to couple up with. Megan and Tommy and Meg and Dejon stayed together, while Alima chose Remell, Toni went with Conor, Helena picked Harry, and Shakira reunited with Ben. Blu and Shea were left single and had to decide between the two of them which would stay in the villa and which would be dumped from the island. After not reaching a decision, the islanders chose to keep Shea, leaving Blu dumped.
Week 1	Challenges	On Day 3, the islanders completed a game of dares where they would pick a card out of a box and complete the dare written on it.; On Day 7, the islanders competed in Got The Receipts where an islander was given a statement about another islander and they had to decide who that statement belonged to by kissing them.
Week 1	Dates	On Day 5, following the entrance of Emily, Malisha, and Yasmin, they were able to each pick one boy they would like to explore on a date. Emily chose Conor, Malisha dated Dejon, and Yasmin picked Harry.
Week 1	Exits	On Day 2, following Shakira's decision to couple up with Harry, Sophie was left single and dumped from the island.; On Day 4, following a recoupling, Blu and Shea were left single and had to decide which one of them would stay in the villa and which would be dumped from the island. As they couldn't make a decision, Blu was then voted out by the islanders and dumped from the island.
Week 2	Entrances	On Day 8, Harrison entered the villa.; On Day 13, Caprice, Giorgio, Poppy, and Will entered the sleepover villa.
Week 2	Coupling	On Day 8, the islanders recoupled for a second time with the boys picking which girl they would like to couple up with. Ben and Shakira, Tommy and Megan, Remell and Alima, Harry and Helena, and Dejon and Meg all remained together, whilst Conor picked Emily, and Shea chose Yasmin. Malisha and Toni were left single and got to date new bombshell Harrison, who would decide which one would return to the villa following their dates. He chose Toni, leaving Malisha dumped from the island.; On Day 12, the islanders recoupled again with the girls picking which boy they would like to couple up with. Meg and Dejon, Alima and Remell, Megan and Tommy, and Emily and Conor all remained together, whilst Toni coupled up with Harrison, Shakira chose Harry, Yasmin went with Ben, and Helena picked Shea.
Week 2	Challenges	On Day 9, the islanders played a game of beer pong in which they separated into boys and girls and had to throw a ping pong ball across a table and if it landed in a cup, a member of the opposing team would have to complete the dare written on the bottom of said cup.; On Day 10, the islanders played a game of Look Who’s Talking where an islander would take a card, read the quote written on it, and the group would guess which islander said the quote.; On Day 12, the islanders played a game of Spin the Bottle, where whoever the bottle lands on, must take a card which will read either truth or dare and the other islanders come up with a truth or dare for that specific person.; On Day 14, the islanders at the sleepover played a game of truth or dare.
Week 2	Dates	On Day 8, new bombshell Harrison got to date both Malisha and Toni and decide which one would return to the villa with him. He chose Toni, leaving Malisha dumped.
Week 2	Exits	On Day 8, single islanders Malisha and Toni each got to date new bombshell Harrison before he decided which one would return to the villa with him. He ultimately chose Toni, leaving Malisha dumped from the island.
Week 3	Entrances	On Day 20, Billykiss and Ryan entered the villa.
Week 3	Coupling	On Day 15, following a sleepover with new bombshells Caprice, Giorgio, Poppy, and Will, islanders Dejon, Emily, Helena, and Remell had to decide if they wanted to recouple with one of the bombshells or stay with their current partner in the villa. Helena chose to recouple with Giorgio, Emily decided to stay coupled up with Conor, Dejon stayed coupled up with Meg, and Remell returned to Alima. The decision left Caprice, Poppy, Shea, and Will dumped from the island.; On Day 18, the islanders recoupled with the boys choosing which girl they wanted to couple up with. Harry and Shakira, Dejon and Meg, and Harrison and Toni all remained together, whilst Tommy coupled up with Emily, Giorgio picked Yasmin, Ben chose Helena, and Conor coupled up with Alima.; On Day 21, each boy was asked to stand if they wished to recouple with Billykiss, while each girl was asked to stand if they wanted to couple up with Ryan. As Conor stood for Billykiss, they became a couple and left Alima single. As no one stood for Ryan, he was also left single. As a result, they were both dumped from the island.
Week 3	Challenges	On Day 18, the islanders competed in the "Snog, Marry, Pie" challenge where each islander had to snog, marry and pie an islander of the opposite gender.; On Day 19, the boys and girls went head-to-head to raise their opposing team's heart rate. At the end of the game they were each told who raised their heart rate the most.
Week 3	Dates	On Day 16, Harrison and Toni left the villa to go on a date.; On Day 20, Ryan chose Shakira and Toni to go on a date, while Billykiss chose Conor and Dejon.
Week 3	Exits	On Day 15, Dejon, Emily, Helena, and Remell had to decide if they wanted to recouple with one of the bombshells following their sleepover or stay with their current partner. Helena recoupled with Giorgio, while Dejon, Emily, and Remell decided to stay coupled up with Meg, Conor, and Alima, respectively. The decision left Caprice, Poppy, Shea, and Will dumped from the island.; On Day 17, after receiving the fewest public votes, Ben, Remell, and Harry, and Toni, Shakira, and Megan were all in danger of leaving. Remell and Megan were dumped from the island after receiving the fewest public votes.; On Day 21, Alima and Ryan were left single and dumped from the island.
Week 4	Entrances	On Day 24, Andrada, Emma, Lauren, Lucy, Rheo, and Yaz entered Casa Amor.; On Day 25, Boris, Cach, Chris, Jamie, Martin, and Ty entered the villa.
Week 4	Coupling	On Day 23, the islanders recoupled again with the boys choosing which girl they wanted to couple up with. Tommy and Emily, Dejon and Meg, and Harrison and Toni all remained together, whilst Harry reunited with Helena, Ben got back with Shakira, Conor chose Yasmin, and Giorgio coupled up with Billykiss.; On Day 27, the original Islanders were told that they would be re-coupling. They were only given the option to remain in their current couple or to choose one of the new Islanders. However, as the boys and the girls were living in separate villas, they were not aware of what the other one chose. If one decided to re-couple and the other did not, then they would be single. Unlike previous seasons, these single islanders would not remain in the villa and were dumped from the island. If both re-coupled then they would both remain in the villa with their new partner, and any remaining single new islanders would be dumped. Meg and Dejon remained together, as did Helena and Harry, whilst Billykiss recoupled with Boris, Shakira chose Ty, Ben picked Andrada, Toni recoupled with Cach, Harrison picked Lauren, Yasmin chose Jamie, Conor recoupled with Emma, and Tommy picked Lucy. As Giorgio and Emily's original partners failed to recouple with them, they remained single. The single islanders were then dumped from the villa.
Week 4	Challenges	On Day 22, the islanders competed in a Superman challenge where the boys had to fly across the sky to grab their couple, then lift up an item to reveal a newspaper. The newspaper featured a statement and the couple would decide which boy matched the statement the most and the least.; On Day 24, the boys and the Casa Amor girls played a game of truth or dare.; On Day 25, the Main Villa and Casa Amor competed in "Raunchy Races" where they had to complete a certain task quicker than the other villa. The game was won by the Main Villa, who subsequently won a party for that evening.
Week 4	Dates	On Day 24, all couples had a brunch date in the garden.
Week 4	Exits	On Day 27, original islanders Emily and Giorgio, and new islanders Chris, Martin, Rheo, and Yaz were dumped from the island after failing to couple up.
Week 5	Entrances	On Day 34, Angel entered the villa.
Week 5	Coupling	On Day 32, the islanders recoupled with the girls choosing which boy they wanted to couple up with. Helena and Harry, Meg and Dejon, and Yasmin and Jamie, and Billykiss and Boris all remained together, whilst Shakira picked Conor, Toni reunited with Harrison, Lauren coupled up with Ty, and Emma chose Cach.; On Day 34, Angel ranked her top boys with Ty in first, Harry in second, and Conor in third. For ranking Ty first, they were coupled up, leaving Lauren single and therefore dumped from the island.
Week 5	Challenges	On Day 34, the islanders took part in "Couple of Sorts, in which they had to correctly guess the order the public had ranked each couple in a series of categories by placing themselves on "1st", "2nd" and "3rd" podiums.
Week 5	Dates	On Day 32, Jamie and Yasmin left the villa to go on their first date.
Week 5	Exits	On Day 31, after receiving the fewest public votes for least compatible couple, Andrada and Ben were immediately dumped from the island. Lauren and Harrison, Emma and Conor, and Lucy and Tommy were the remaining couples who received the fewest votes and were at risk of being dumped. It was then down to Shakira and Ty, who had received the most public votes, to decide which couple to dump. They chose Lucy and Tommy.; On Day 34, after Angel ranked Ty as her top boy, they were coupled up leaving Lauren single and therefore dumped from the island.; On Day 35, Harrison decided to voluntarily leave the villa.
Week 6	Entrances	On Day 39, dumped islanders Blu and Megan returned to the villa.
Week 6	Coupling	On Day 42, the islanders recoupled again with the boys choosing which girl they wanted to couple up with. Jamie and Yasmin, Dejon and Meg, and Ty and Angel all remained together, whilst Cash reunited with Toni, Conor chose Megan, Harry got back with Shakira, ultimately leaving Blu to couple up with Helena.
Week 6	Challenges	On Day 36, the girls competed in "Sauciest Snogger", in which they had to kiss each boy. The boys, who were blindfolded, would subsequently give each of the girls a score out of ten. Toni received the most points and ultimately won the challenge.
Week 6	Dates	On Day 37, Dejon and Meg left the villa to go on their first date.; On Day 39, dumped islanders Blu and Megan returned to the villa and each got to pick an islander to take on a date. They chose Angel and Conor, respectively.
Week 6	Exits	On Day 38, the public voted for their favorite girl and their favorite boy. Toni and Yasmin, and Cach and Ty received the most votes. The bottom three girls were revealed to be Billykiss, Emma, and Angel, while the bottom three boys were Boris, Conor, and Harry. Since Emma and Boris received the fewest votes, they were dumped from the island immediately. As there were seven girls and six boys remaining in the villa, Billykiss and Angel were at risk of being dumped. As they were voted the favorite islanders, Cach, Toni, Ty, and Yasmin had to decide which girl to dump. They ultimately chose to dump Billykiss from the island.
Week 7	Challenges	On Day 44, the islanders competed in "Couple Goals". For each question that was asked, each couple had to answer with their opinion on which couple best fit that question.; On Day 45, the islanders took part in a talent show, after which they had to collectively decide who was the winner. They chose Helena.; On Day 46, the couples were challenged with becoming parents and looking after a doll.; On Day 46, the islanders took part in "Knowing Me, Knowing You", where the couples had to see how well they knew their partner. Dejon and Meg and Shakira and Harry both won after getting the most joint questions correct.
Week 7	Dates	On Day 47, the couples had their final dates in the villa.
Week 7	Exits	On Day 45, following a public vote, Blu and Helena received the fewest votes and were dumped from the island.; On Day 47, following a public vote, Megan and Conor were voted as the least compatible couple.; On Day 48, following a vote for the public's favorite couple, Meg and Dejon, and Angel and Ty received the fewest votes and were at risk of being dumped from the island. Dumped islanders returned to the villa to decide which of the two couples was the least compatible and would be dumped from the island. Blu, Tommy, Lucy, Harrison, Emily, Lauren, Giorgio, and Helena voted for Angel and Ty, whilst Sophie, Shea, Remell, Ben, Alima, Boris, Malisha, Emma, Andrada, and Billykiss all voted for Meg and Dejon. Since Meg and Dejon received the most votes, they were dumped from the island.
Week 8	Exits	On Day 50, Angel and Ty finished in fourth place and Yasmin and Jamie finished third. Toni and Cach were then announced as the winners, leaving Shakira and Harry as runners-up.

== Episodes ==
No. overall	No. in series	Title	Day(s)	Original release date	Prod. code
Week 1
471	1	"Episode 1"	Day 1	9 June 2025	1201
472	2	"Episode 2"	Days 1–2	10 June 2025	1202
473	3	"Episode 3"	Days 2–3	11 June 2025	1203
474	4	"Episode 4"	Days 3–4	12 June 2025	1204
475	5	"Episode 5"	Days 4–5	13 June 2025	1205
476	6	"Episode 6: Unseen Bits"	N/A (Note: This episode showcased events from the previous days in the week. No new or present days were featured.)	14 June 2025	1206
477	7	"Episode 7"	Days 5–6	15 June 2025	1207
478	8	"Episode 8"	Days 6–7	16 June 2025	1208
Week 2
479	9	"Episode 9"	Days 7–8	17 June 2025	1209
480	10	"Episode 10"	Days 8–9	18 June 2025	1210
481	11	"Episode 11"	Days 9–10	19 June 2025	1211
482	12	"Episode 12"	Days 10–11	20 June 2025	1212
493	13	"Episode 13: Unseen Bits"	N/A	21 June 2025	1213
494	14	"Episode 14"	Days 11–12	22 June 2025	1214
495	15	"Episode 15"	Days 12–13	23 June 2025	1215
496	16	"Episode 16"	Days 13–14	24 June 2025	1216
Week 3
497	17	"Episode 17"	Days 14–15	25 June 2025	1217
498	18	"Episode 18"	Days 15–16	26 June 2025	1218
499	19	"Episode 19"	Days 16–17	27 June 2025	1219
500	20	"Episode 20: Unseen Bits"	N/A	28 June 2025	1220
501	21	"Episode 21"	Days 17–18	29 June 2025	1221
502	22	"Episode 22"	Days 18–19	30 June 2025	1222
503	23	"Episode 23"	Days 19–20	1 July 2025	1223
504	24	"Episode 24"	Days 20–21	2 July 2025	1224
Week 4
505	25	"Episode 25"	Days 21–22	3 July 2025	1225
506	26	"Episode 26"	Days 22–23	4 July 2025	1226
507	27	"Episode 27: Unseen Bits"	N/A	5 July 2025	1227
508	28	"Episode 28"	Day 24	6 July 2025	1228
509	29	"Episode 29"	Days 24–25	7 July 2025	1229
510	30	"Episode 30"	Days 25–26	8 July 2025	1230
511	31	"Episode 31"	Day 27	9 July 2025	1231
512	32	"Episode 32"	Days 27–28	10 July 2025	1232
Week 5
513	33	"Episode 33"	Days 28–29	11 July 2025	1233
514	34	"Episode 34: Unseen Bits"	N/A	12 July 2025	1234
515	35	"Episode 35"	Days 29–30	13 July 2025	1235
516	36	"Episode 36"	Days 30–31	14 July 2025	1236
517	37	"Episode 37"	Days 31–32	15 July 2025	1237
518	38	"Episode 38"	Days 32–33	16 July 2025	1238
519	39	"Episode 39"	Days 33–34	17 July 2025	1239
520	40	"Episode 40"	Days 34–35	18 July 2025	1240
Week 6
521	41	"Episode 41: Unseen Bits"	N/A	19 July 2025	1241
522	42	"Episode 42"	Day 35–36	20 July 2025	1242
523	43	"Episode 43"	Day 36–37	21 July 2025	1243
524	44	"Episode 44"	Day 37–38	22 July 2025	1244
525	45	"Episode 45"	Day 38–39	23 July 2025	1245
526	46	"Episode 46"	Day 39–40	24 July 2025	1246
527	47	"Episode 47"	Day 40	25 July 2025	1247
528	48	"Episode 48: Unseen Bits"	N/A	26 July 2025	1258
529	49	"Episode 49"	Days 41–42	27 July 2025	1249
Week 7
530	50	"Episode 50"	Days 42–43	28 July 2025	1250
531	51	"Episode 51"	Days 43–44	29 July 2025	1251
532	52	"Episode 52"	Days 44–45	30 July 2025	1252
533	53	"Episode 53"	Days 45–46	31 July 2025	1253
534	54	"Episode 54"	Days 46–47	1 August 2025	1254
535	55	"Episode 55: Unseen Bits"	N/A	2 August 2025	1255
536	56	"Episode 56"	Days 47–48	3 August 2025	1256
Week 8
537	57	"Episode 57"	Days 48–50	4 August 2025	1257

== Ratings ==
Official ratings are taken from BARB. Because the Saturday episodes are "Unseen Bits" episodes rather than nightly highlights, these are not included in the overall averages. Viewing figures are consolidated 7-day viewing figures with pre-broadcast viewing and viewing on tablets, PCs and smartphones included.

	Viewers (millions)								
	Week 1	Week 2	Week 3	Week 4	Week 5	Week 6	Week 7	Week 8	Week 9
Sunday		2.12	2.46	2.45	2.46	1.77	2.49	2.40	2.30
Monday	2.25	2.21	2.33	2.50	2.37	2.60	2.40	2.53	3.40
Tuesday	2.32	2.31	2.40	2.62	2.46	2.57	2.33	2.43	
Wednesday	2.26	2.30	2.35	2.56	2.37	2.47	2.33	2.47	
Thursday	2.15	2.24	2.38	2.43	2.50	2.52	2.60	2.28	
Friday	N/A	2.33	2.40	2.29	2.72	2.52	2.37	2.33	
Weekly average	2.24	2.25	2.39	2.48	2.48	2.41	2.42	2.41	2.85
Running average	2.24	2.25	2.29	2.34	2.37	2.38	2.38	2.39	2.44
Series average	2.44								
