= Jasmine Müller =

British television personality (born 26 September 1998)

- Born: Jasmine Gaziza Müller; 26 September 1998 (age 28); Dubai, United Arab Emirates
- Citizenship: British, Danish
- Education: University College London
- Occupations: Television personality, influencer
- Years active: 2018-present
- Height: 1.67 m (5 ft 6 in)
- Partner: Kavan Murphy (2026-present)
- Parent(s): Steen Müller, Husna Gaziza
- Relatives: Isabella Müller

Jasmine Müller (born 26 September 1998) is a British-Danish television personality, influencer, model and businesswoman.

== Early life & career ==
Jasmine Gaziza Müller was born in Dubai, United Arab Emirates on 26 September 1998 to Husna Gaziza and Steen Müller. Her mother is British-Indian and her father is Danish. Her parents are separated. Müller would spend time as a child with her family in Denmark, often skiing. Müller holds British and Danish citizenship. In 2018, Müller starred on the YouTube reality program NAYVA.

Müller moved to London, where she studied anthropology at University College London. She has a younger sister, Isabella Müller, with whom she is the co-founder of the fashion brand Mahila Intimates.

Müller was in a relationship with former Arsenal player Héctor Bellerín from 2018 to 2021. Bellerín has a tattoo of Müller's face on his hand.

Love Island

On 27 May 2026, Müller was announced as part of the main cast for the thirteenth series of Love Island, entering on Day 1. Müller attracted media attention for her outspoken views on feminism, gender roles and relationships.

In June 2026, The Independent published an article examining her influence on the programme, particularly her discussions of gender expectations and her willingness to challenge other contestants. Her appearance prompted wider discussion of feminism and female representation in reality television.

Whilst initially paired up with Lorenzo Alessi, she later went on to place as the runner-up of the season alongside fellow contestant Kavan Murphy. Following the conclusion of Love Island, Müller continued her relationship with Murphy. In September 2026, the couple publicly confirmed that they had become boyfriend and girlfriend. They subsequently appeared together on the podcast Newly Parents, hosted by Jamie Laing and Sophie Habboo, where they discussed their relationship and experiences following the programme. Müller revealed in an interview with Cosmopolitan that she had developed a friendship with British actress Millie Bobby Brown following her appearance on Love Island. Brown had supported Müller during the series.

== Filmography ==
=== Television ===
As herself
Year	Title	Notes	Ref.
2026	Love Island	Contestant; series 13	
2026	This Morning	Guest; 1 episode	

=== Music videos ===
Year	Title	Artist(s)	Ref.
2025	"In Your Skin"	Mac Wetha	
