= Yasmin Pettet =

English television personality and model (born 2001)

- Born: Yasmin Rahmani Pettet; 17 February 2001 (age 25); Hackney, London, England
- Occupations: Television personality; Model
- Years active: 2025–present
- Known for: Love Island
- Modeling information
- Height: 5 ft 5 in (1.65 m)
- Agency: Storm Management (2025–2026)

Yasmin Rahmani Pettet (born 17 February 2001) is an English television personality and model known for appearing as a contestant on the twelfth series of the ITV2 dating series Love Island in 2025.

== Life and career ==
Yasmin Rahmani Pettet was born on 17 February 2001 in Hackney, London, and has a twin sister named Zara. She is of English and Persian descent. Pettet was diagnosed with Crohn's disease as a teenager. Prior to appearing on television, she worked as a commercial banking executive at Arbuthnot Latham, a private and merchant bank in London.

In June 2025, she was announced as a "bombshell" contestant on the twelfth series of the ITV2 dating show Love Island. After entering the villa on Day 5 of the series, alongside Emily Moran and Malisha Jordan respectively, she gained popularity with the programme's viewers for her posture and behaviour, which was described as AI generated, leading to her being given the nickname "YasGPT", a play on the OpenAI chatbot ChatGPT. Pettet was described by the show's narrator Iain Stirling as an "elite islander" whilst Cosmopolitan magazine said she was "bombshelling like no other". Throughout her time on the show, Pettet was coupled up with fellow islanders Shea Mannings, Ben Holbrough, Giorgio Russo and Conor Phillips. She met and subsequently coupled up with Jamie Rhodes during the "Casa Amor" segment of the show. Pettet and Rhodes finished in third place. Pettet's pet cat, Miaow Miaow, died whilst she was on Love Island, unbeknownst to her until the show's conclusion.

Since 2025, Pettet and fellow Love Island contestant Toni Laites have been ambassadors for Crohn's and Colitis UK.

In 2026, Pettet was announced as a co-host for the new Love Island companion vodcast The Debrief alongside fellow series 12 finalists Toni Laites and Shakira Khan. Pettet also joined Love Island: Aftersun as a permanent panellist.

== Filmography ==
As herself
Year	Title	Role	Notes	Ref.
2025	Love Island	Contestant	Series 12; third place	
2025	This Morning	Guest	1 episode	
2026	Love Island: Aftersun	Panellist	Main cast	
2026	Love Island: The Debrief	Co-host	Main cast	
