= Love Island (2015 TV series) =

British television series

Coordinates: 39.6232°N 3.2498°E

- Genre: Reality
- Created by: Brent Baker; Jo Scarratt; Mark Busk-Cowley; Tom Gould
- Written by: Iain Stirling; Mark Busk-Cowley; Steve Parry
- Creative directors: Richard Cowles; Tom Gould; Mike Spencer
- Presented by: Caroline Flack (2015–2019); Laura Whitmore (2020–2022); Maya Jama (2023–2026); TBC (2027–)
- Starring: Love Island contestants
- Narrated by: Iain Stirling
- Music by: Andrei Basirov; Toby Jarvis
- Country of origin: United Kingdom
- Original language: English
- No. of series: 13
- No. of episodes: 610

Production
- Executive producers: Richard Cowles; Tom Gould; Sarah Tyekiff; Becca Walker; Martin Oxley; Mandy Morris; Kat Lennox; Andy Cadman; Lauren Hicks; Simon Martin; Katrina Morrison; Mike Spencer; Iona MacKenzie; Oli Head; Louise Walls; Lewis Evans; Justin Saculles; Sophie Bush; Charlotte Smith
- Running time: 60–95 minutes (incl. adverts)
- Production companies: ITV Studios (2015–2020); Lifted Entertainment (2021–present); WPP Motion Entertainment (2023–present)

Original release
- Network: ITV2
- Release: 7 June 2015 – present

Related
- Celebrity Love Island; Love Island (franchise); Love Island: Aftersun; Love Island: All Stars; Love Island: The Debrief

Love Island is a British reality show. It is a revival of the earlier celebrity series of the same name, which aired for two series in 2005 and 2006. The series is the originator of the international Love Island franchise, with twenty-two versions of it having been produced so far worldwide. Love Island was presented by Maya Jama until 2026, with a new host to be announced and has been narrated by Iain Stirling since its inception. The show was previously hosted by Caroline Flack and Laura Whitmore, in order. Each presenter has also hosted its companion show, Love Island: Aftersun.

The show has been highly successful and influential in British popular culture; it became ITV2's most watched show in the network's history in 2018, and as of 2020 was the most watched TV show among its target audience of 16- to 34-year-olds. However, it has attracted a considerable amount of controversy, with four people linked to the show having died by suicide. Contestants Sophie Gradon and Mike Thalassitis died by suicide after appearing on the program; Gradon's boyfriend died by suicide about 20 days after her death. The following year, the show's original presenter, Caroline Flack, also died by suicide. Due to this and the negative effects that contestants deal with on and after the show, there have been calls from some to cancel the programme.

== Format ==
Love Island involves a group of contestants, referred to as "Islanders", living in isolation from the outside world in a villa in Mallorca, constantly under video surveillance. To survive in the villa the Islanders must be coupled up with another Islander, whether it be for love, friendship, or money, and the overall winning couple receives a combined £50,000. On the first day, the Islanders couple up for the first time based on first impressions, but over the duration of the series they are forced to "re-couple" where they can choose to remain in their current couple or swap partners.

Any Islander who remains single after the re-coupling is eliminated and dumped from the island. Islanders can also be eliminated via public vote, as during the series the public votes through the Love Island app available on smartphones for their favourite couple or prospective couple. Pairs who receive the fewest votes risk being eliminated. Often a twist has occurred where it has been up to the Islanders to vote one of their own off the island. During the final week, the public vote towards which couple they want to win the series and therefore take home £50,000.

During the first series, the Thursday episode was presented live by Caroline Flack where eliminations often took place and new Islanders entered the villa. However, from the second series onwards the live episodes were axed except for the final. Whilst in the villa, each Islander has their own phone in which they can only contact other Islanders via text – or receive texts informing them of the latest challenges, dumpings or recouplings. Islanders and couples are typically faced with many games and challenges to take part in designed to test their physical and mental ability, with the winners getting special prizes afterwards. Some Islanders are also sent on dates outside the villa, or can win dates by winning challenges.

== History ==
=== Development, Caroline Flack era (2015–2019) ===
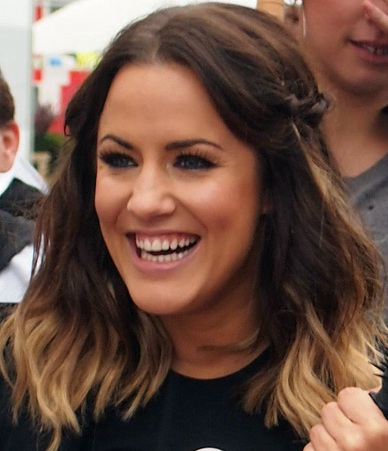
Original host Caroline Flack hosted Love Island for the first five series until her death on 15 February 2020.

On 13 February 2015, it was confirmed that Love Island would be returning, and would be aired on ITV2. However this series would include members of the public rather than celebrities. On 18 April 2015, it was announced that Caroline Flack would be hosting the show. The series began airing on 7 June 2015, with a live special showing the new Islanders enter the villa. During the series, celebrity guests entered the villa including Calum Best who won the second and final series of the first iteration of Love Island in 2006. Mark Wright also appeared to DJ at contestant Lauren Richardson's 27th birthday party. The first series ended on 15 July 2015 and was won by Jess Hayes and Max Morley. In 2017, fourth-placed finalists Cally Jane Beech and Luis Morrison became the first couple from the show to have a baby together.

Iain Stirling, narrator of Love Island since its inception in 2015.

The second series was confirmed on 14 February 2016, and began airing on 30 May 2016. This series featured the first Islander to be removed from the villa. Malia Arkian only spent a matter of hours in the villa before she was removed from the series by the producers after an altercation with Kady McDermott. It also included a number of Islanders who decided to voluntarily leave the villa, the first being Rykard Jenkins.

Also during this series, Islander Zara Holland was stripped of her Miss Great Britain title due to her behaviour in the villa. The second series also included Sophie Gradon and Katie Salmon becoming the first same-sex couple on the show. The series was eventually won by Cara De La Hoyde and Nathan Massey on 11 July 2016. On 15 September 2018, the series runners-up Olivia Buckland and Alex Bowen married, becoming the first couple from Love Island to marry.

The third series was confirmed on 14 February 2017, and began airing on 5 June 2017. This series was the first series to include a second villa, which was brought into the series during a twist set to put the couples to the ultimate test. This series also featured dumped Islanders Mike Thalassitis and Sam Gowland returning to the villa after being voted back in by the public; a first for the show. The series ended on 24 July 2017 and was won by Amber Davies and Kem Cetinay. During the final Aftersun episode of the series, which was presented live from outside the villa, it was announced that there would be a one-off reunion special airing on 30 July 2017 which included all of the Islanders from the series.

The fourth series began on 4 June 2018, and launched with a record 4,050,000 viewers making it the most watched multichannel TV programme since the 2012 Summer Olympics were broadcast on BBC Three, and the most watched ever on ITV2. The series included the reintroduction of "Casa Amor" following its success in the previous series. The series concluded on 30 July 2018 and was won by Dani Dyer and Jack Fincham, who received a record-breaking 79.66% of the final vote.

It was also confirmed that another one-off reunion special would air a week after the final. As the fourth series began, the Islanders experienced tragedy with the suicides of Gradon and her boyfriend Aaron Armstrong, as well as the suicide of Thalassitis months after the series concluded. After the latter's death, the programme announced that they would offer counselling to all contestants in hopes of preventing further suicides.

A fifth series was confirmed on 30 July 2018, which started broadcasting on 3 June 2019. The series increased upon the previous success of the fourth, gaining a record-breaking 4,700,000 viewers on TV sets and a further 1,400,000 viewers on other devices for the episode following Casa Amor, the most for any ITV2 broadcast. Furthermore, more than half of the viewers were in the 16 to 34 age bracket. The series concluded on 29 July 2019 and was won by Amber Gill and Greg O'Shea with a 48.82% share of the vote.

=== Launch of Winter series, Caroline Flack steps down (2019) ===
On 24 July 2019, ITV announced that two series of Love Island would air in 2020 – one in the winter and another in the traditional summer slot. The winter series would be broadcast in January 2020 from a new villa in South Africa. On 17 December 2019, Flack announced that she would be standing down as host for the sixth series following allegations of assault towards her boyfriend, Lewis Burton. On 20 December, it was announced that fellow TV presenter Laura Whitmore would be standing in as the new host.

=== Suicide of Caroline Flack (2020) ===
On 15 February 2020, Flack was found dead in her London home, after committing suicide by hanging, prompting ITV to pull two episodes from airing out of respect for the former host at the weekend. Series 6 continued from 17 February and Iain Stirling, the show's narrator, paid tribute to Flack saying he was devastated by the loss of his "true friend". Sponsorship adverts for fast-food company Just Eat were replaced by a message telling people to be kind, with a contact number for the Samaritans.

=== Laura Whitmore era (2020–2022) ===
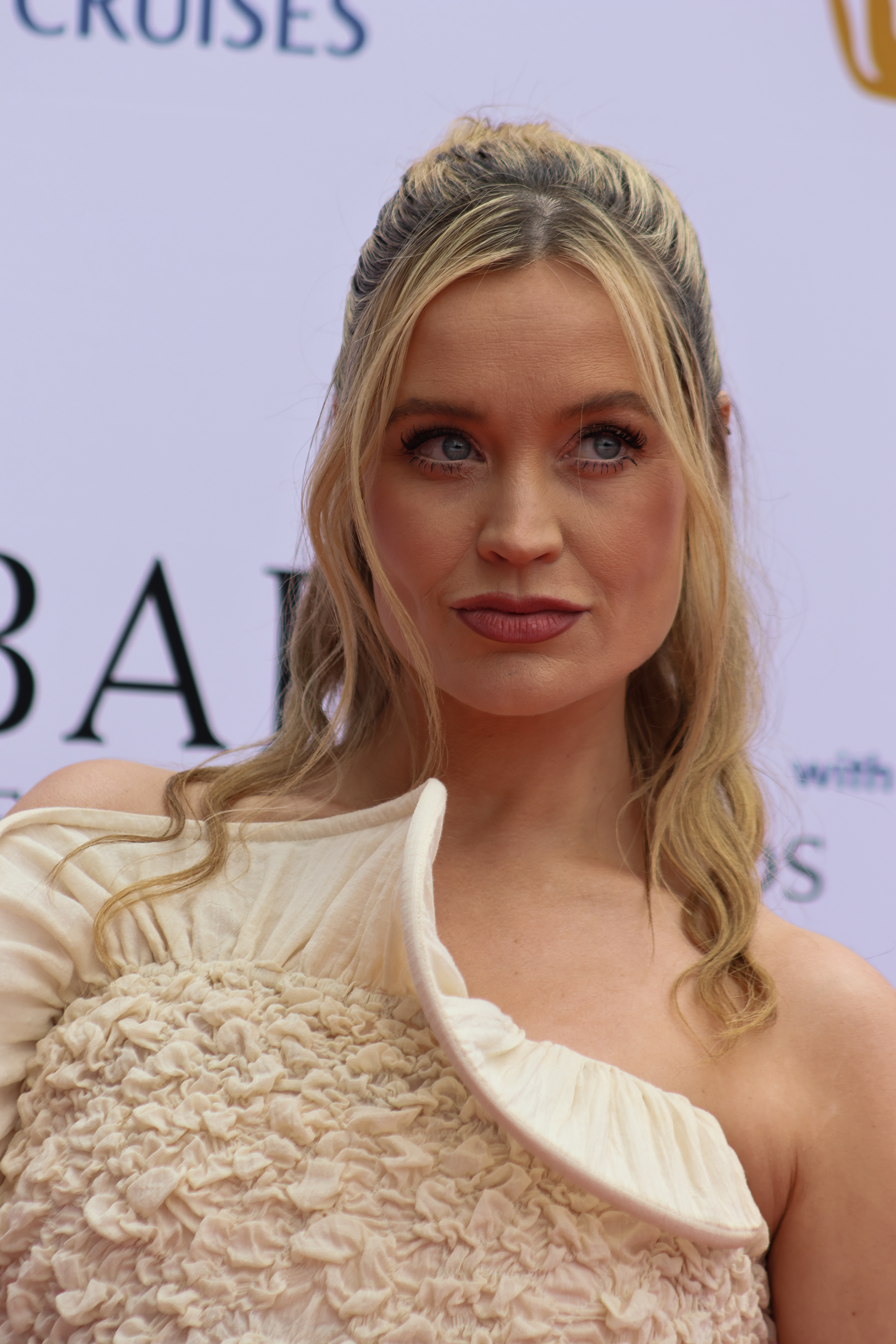
Laura Whitmore took over as host starting with the sixth series in 2020.

On 20 December 2019, it was announced that fellow TV presenter Laura Whitmore would be taking over as the new host, after Caroline Flack stood down from hosting the show.

On 4 May 2020, Love Island announced the cancellation of the summer 2020 show due to the COVID-19 pandemic. Kevin Lygo, ITV's Director of Television said in a statement: "We have tried every which way to make Love Island this summer but logistically it's just not possible to produce it in a way that safeguards the wellbeing of everyone involved and that for us is the priority. In normal circumstances we would be preparing very soon to travel out to the location in Mallorca to get the villa ready but clearly that's now out of the question." It was later confirmed that the show would not be airing a winter version of the series in 2021 due to uncertainties regarding the pandemic and international travel.

On 4 March 2021, ITV confirmed that Love Island would return in the summer after an 18-month hiatus. An eighth series was announced at the end of series seven in August 2021 and began airing the following summer on 6 June 2022. Also in June 2022, ITV announced that two series would air in 2023, with one airing in the New Year in South Africa and the second returning to Mallorca in its usual summer slot. On 22 August, Whitmore announced that she would not be returning to host the show's ninth series in January 2023.

=== Maya Jama era (2022–2026) ===
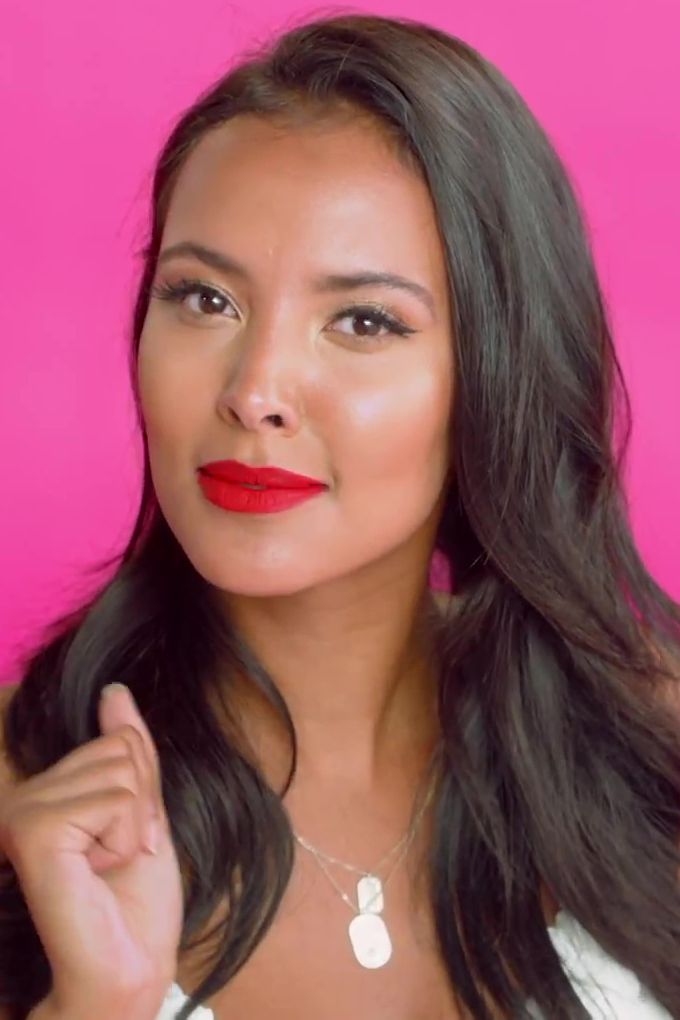
Maya Jama was host from 2022 to 2026.

On 12 October 2022, ITV2 announced that Maya Jama would be taking over from Whitmore as Love Island host. On 5 September 2023, ITV confirmed they had ordered Love Island: All Stars, with the spin-off taking place in South Africa from 2024 onwards. On 8 November 2026, Jama announced her exit from the series.

== Hosts ==
Hosts	Series												
Hosts	1	2	3	4	5	6	7	8	9	10	11	12	13
Caroline Flack													
Laura Whitmore													
Maya Jama													
Iain Stirling (narrator)													

== Series overview ==
Series	Islanders	Days	Location	Host	Episodes	Originally released		Winners	Runners-up	Average viewers (millions)
Series	Islanders	Days	Location	Host	Episodes	First released	Last released	Winners	Runners-up	Average viewers (millions)
1	23	41	Santanyí	Caroline Flack	29	7 June 2015	15 July 2015	Jess Hayes & Max Morley	Hannah Elizabeth & Jon Clark	0.57
2	26	45	Santanyí	Caroline Flack	37	30 May 2016	11 July 2016	Cara De La Hoyde & Nathan Massey	Alex Bowen & Olivia Buckland	1.47
3	32	52	Sant Llorenç des Cardassar	Caroline Flack	43	5 June 2017	24 July 2017	Amber Davies & Kem Cetinay	Camilla Thurlow & Jamie Jewitt	2.52
4	38	59	Sant Llorenç des Cardassar	Caroline Flack	49	4 June 2018	30 July 2018	Dani Dyer & Jack Fincham	Laura Anderson & Paul Knops	3.96
5	36	58	Sant Llorenç des Cardassar	Caroline Flack	49	3 June 2019	29 July 2019	Amber Gill & Greg O'Shea	Molly-Mae Hague & Tommy Fury	5.61
6	32	44	Constantia, Cape Town	Laura Whitmore	36	12 January 2020	23 February 2020	Finn Tapp & Paige Turley	Luke Trotman & Siânnise Fudge	3.96
7	37	58	Sant Llorenç des Cardassar	Laura Whitmore	49	28 June 2021	23 August 2021	Liam Reardon & Millie Court	Chloe Burrows & Toby Aromolaran	4.17
8	36	58	Sant Llorenç des Cardassar	Laura Whitmore	49	6 June 2022	1 August 2022	Davide Sanclimenti & Ekin-Su Cülcüloğlu	Gemma Owen & Luca Bish	4.46
9	35	58	Franschhoek	Maya Jama	49	16 January 2023	13 March 2023	Kai Fagan & Sanam Harrinanan	Lana Jenkins & Ron Hall	N/A
10	32	58	Sant Llorenç des Cardassar	Maya Jama	49	5 June 2023	31 July 2023	Jess Harding & Sammy Root	Lochan Nowacki & Whitney Adebayo	N/A
11	39	48	Sant Llorenç des Cardassar	Maya Jama	57	3 June 2024	29 July 2024	Josh Oyinsan & Mimii Ngulube	Ciaran Davies & Nicole Samuel	N/A
12	38	50	Sant Llorenç des Cardassar	Maya Jama	57	9 June 2025	4 August 2025	Cach Mercer & Toni Laites	Harry Cooksley & Shakira Khan	2.38
13	38	48	Sant Llorenç des Cardassar	Maya Jama	57	1 June 2026	27 July 2026	Julia Majchrzak & Lorenzo Alessi	Jasmine Müller & Kavan Murphy	N/A

== Spin-offs ==
=== Current ===
==== Love Island: Aftersun ====
In May 2017, it was confirmed that a new spin-off show, Love Island: Aftersun, would air during the third series. It airs live on Sundays after the highlights episode and is presented by the host of the main show, currently Maya Jama. Love Island: Aftersun does not air during Love Island: All Stars, with Jama instead interviewing dumped contestants from the South Africa villa, rather than from the London studio.

==== Love Island: Unseen Bits ====
Love Island: Unseen Bits began in the fifth series, when it replaced The Weekly Hotlist. Unseen Bits consists of unaired footage from the preceding week in the villa, with narration from Iain Stirling.

==== Love Island Games ====
A spin-off, Love Island Games, premiered on Peacock in November 2023. It features previous Love Island contestants from various countries competing in challenges.

==== Love Island: All Stars ====
In September 2023, the commissioning of Love Island: All Stars was officially announced by ITV. The show featured a line-up of former contestants from the previous ten series. The show had included returning contestants before, with Adam Collard, who was a contestant on the fourth series and Kady McDermott who was a contestant on the second series returning as "bombshells" in the eighth and tenth series of the show respectively. However, All Stars was the first to feature a line-up consisting of only returning contestants.

==== Love Island: The Debrief ====
Announced to accompany series 13, The Debrief airs as a nightly companion vodcast after the main programme. It replaces The Morning After which previously served as the programme's accompanying podcast. The Debrief is hosted by series 12 finalists Toni Laites, Shakira Khan and Yasmin Pettet.

=== Former ===
==== Love Island: The Weekly Hot List ====
For the first four series, a weekly re-cap episode entitled Love Island: The Weekly Hot List aired every Saturday and included a round-up of events in the villa over the past week. This also included unseen footage.

==== Love Island: The Reunion ====
Beginning in 2017, Love Island: The Reunion was broadcast on ITV2, interviewing the islanders and remembering the most memorable moments from the preceding series. It was presented by the host of the main series. Comedian Darren Harriott co-hosted the series 8 reunion. The reunion typically featured musical performances from artists including Becky Hill and Switch Disco.

The programme ran every series until August 2024, when it was confirmed that the programme had been axed. In 2025, despite speculation, it was announced that Love Island: The Reunion had not been renewed. However, there was a private, unfilmed wrap party for series 12 contestants.

==== Chris & Kem: Straight Outta Love Island ====
On 1 and 2 October 2017, Chris Hughes and Kem Cetinay starred in their own spin-off show, Chris & Kem: Straight Outta Love Island, which followed the popular double act as they write a rap song to perform at a Ministry of Sound club night. The two-part series also starred Chris and Kem's girlfriends from Love Island, Olivia Attwood and Amber Davies. It was broadcast on ITV2.

==== Love Island: The Morning After ====
Ahead of the fourth series in 2018, it was revealed that former islander Kem Cetinay and Scottish DJ Arielle Free would be presenting Love Island: The Morning After, a new daily podcast show delivering the freshest gossip to fans. The pair left after the 2022 season and in January 2023 Sam Thompson and series 8 contestant Indiyah Polack were announced as the show's new hosts. Amy Hart, who was previously a contestant on the fifth series, joined the podcast in January 2024. Thompson left the show in May 2024 and was replaced by Chris Taylor, who was a contestant on the fifth series and the first series of Love Island: All Stars. From 2025, the show was solely hosted by Polack and Hart. The podcast also aired during Love Island: All Stars. Polack and Hart continued to host the podcast during All Stars series 3, but announced their joint departure ahead of the main series, set to air later in 2026. The Morning After did not return to accompany series 13 and was instead replaced by Love Island: The Debrief.

==== Chris and Olivia: Crackin' On ====
In March 2018, a fly-on-the-wall documentary spin-off titled Chris and Olivia: Crackin' On was aired and followed the life about contestants; Chris Hughes and Olivia Attwood after Love Island and their dramatic split. Unlike the other spin-offs and the main show, it was broadcast on ITVBe.

==== The Boxer & The Ballroom Dancer ====
Tommy Fury and Curtis Pritchard starred in The Boxer & The Ballroom Dancer in December 2019, which saw the pair step out of their comfort zones as they swapped jobs.

==== Jack & Dani: Life After Love Island ====
Series 4 winners Dani Dyer and Jack Fincham starred in Jack & Dani: Life After Love Island in January 2019. The series followed the pair as they moved in together, got a puppy and took on life outside the villa.

==== Ekin-Su and Davide: Homecomings ====
Ekin-Su Cülcüloğlu and Davide Sanclimenti starred in Ekin-Su and Davide: Homecomings in November 2022. Following their Series 8 win, the new couple embarked on two trips of a lifetime to Davide's beloved Italy and Ekin-Su's hometown in Turkey.

== Locations ==
=== Summer series: Mallorca ===
The main Mallorcan villa for the UK version of Love Island is Sa Vinyassa in Sant Llorenç des Cardassar, Casa Amor is the nearby Alchemy Villa, and the Vibe Club is the Shiva Beach Club in Llucmajor.

Between 2017 and 2021, the main villa was Diseminado Poligono 5 near Sant Llorenç des Cardassar.

=== Winter series: South Africa ===
The villa for the 2023 winter series was the 25-acre Ludus Magnus estate in the Franschhoek wine valley. The previous winter series in 2020 was filmed at Midden Cottage in the Constantia suburb of Cape Town.

== Reception ==
In 2018, Love Island received the BAFTA TV Award for the Best Reality and Constructed Factual category. The writer George Gillett has suggested that the show's success is a consequence of allowing viewers to explore taboos around dating and relationships through shared, communal, vicarious experience.

=== Complaints ===
The show has received numerous complaints, with 4,100 people lodging official complaints about the 2018 series over issues such as the footage aired and how contestants have treated one another. The charity Women's Aid has criticized the treatment of female contestants by "controlling" and "abusive" male contestants, highlighting concerns about emotionally manipulative behavior such as gaslighting (a form of psychological manipulation that causes individuals to question their own reality). Additional criticism has focused on how these behaviors are portrayed, with some arguing that existing broadcasting regulations were not fully effective in preventing or addressing such content. The Mental Health Foundation charity has also criticized the show for the negative impact it can have on viewers who feel insecure about their bodies. The show has also received criticism for its lack of body and ethnic diversity. The show's producers responded to this criticism by stating that the show was "aspirational" and that they "make no excuses" about having a cast of 'attractive' people on the show.

=== Mental health concerns ===
Concerns of mental health impacts of Love Island participants has been noted following the deaths of original host Caroline Flack and contestants Sophie Gradon and Mike Thalassitis all within a 20-month period by suicide. Gradon's boyfriend also died by suicide about 20 days after her death. After the suicides of Gradon and Thalassitis, concerns were raised about the pressures of reality television. Before her death, Gradon had spoken of the attacks she had received from online trolls as a result of appearing on the programme.

Ian Hamilton, a senior lecturer at the University of York on addiction and mental health, described the programme as one that "thrives on manufacturing conflict" and that "unfortunately it's the contestants who bear the brunt of this". After Flack's death in February 2020, there were calls from some social media users to cancel the programme. Questions were raised about the pressures of the show, and some drew attention to how The Jeremy Kyle Show had recently been cancelled after the suicide of a participant. In response, producers of the show provided training on handling negativity, financial management, and social media.

Some contestants have had revenge porn containing explicit images of them posted online and have received death threats.

In May 2024, ITV announced that it was reintroducing its ban on families and friends posting on contestants' social media accounts ahead of the 2024 summer series. The ban had originally been introduced in 2023 as part of the show's new duty of care protocols, with a commitment to protecting islanders and their families from the harmful effects of social media having been cited. However, the ban was lifted during Love Island All Stars.

From the audience perspective, health professionals have raised concerns about the potential harm to young viewers regarding the increase in advertisements that promote cosmetic surgery and the program's frequent portrayal of contestants who have undergone such procedures. Critics argue that this may contribute to unrealistic beauty standards and negatively impact viewers' body image and self-esteem.

== Merchandise ==
Love Island Pool Party compilation albums have been released by Ministry of Sound since 2018. A Love Island app was released in 2017 by ITV Studios Global Entertainment, and Love Island: The Game was released in 2018 by Fusebox Games. It was reported by the Evening Standard in May 2020 that 12 million people globally had played the game.
