= Toni Laites =

American television personality (born 2000)

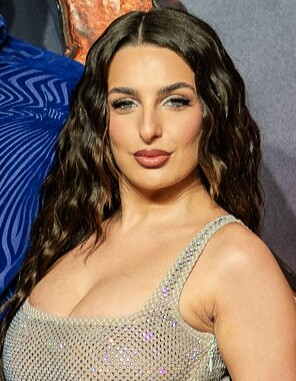
- Laites in 2025
- Born: Antonia Laites; July 1, 2000 (age 26); Newington, Connecticut, U.S.
- Education: Florida Atlantic University
- Occupation: Television personality
- Years active: 2025–present
- Television: Love Island (Winner); Love Island: The Debrief

Antonia "Toni" Laites (born July 1, 2000) is an American television personality, known for winning the twelfth series of Love Island in 2025.

== Life and career ==
Antonia Laites was born on July 1, 2000 in Connecticut, U.S. Laites graduated from Florida Atlantic University in 2021, and earned a bachelor's degree in public management. Prior to appearing on television, she worked as a model and pool cabana server at Fontainebleau Las Vegas. While she was a teenager, she was diagnosed with ulcerative colitis.

In June 2025, she was announced as the first bombshell on the twelfth series of the ITV2 dating series Love Island. She also became the first American bombshell on the series. Upon entering the villa, she immediately had to pick one of the boys to couple up with. She ultimately chose Ben Holbrough, which left Shakira Khan single and vulnerable. She later coupled up with Conor Phillips before being left single, along with Malisha Jordan, following a recoupling on day eight. The two of them got to date new bombshell Harrison Solomon and he would choose which one to bring back to the villa, ultimately choosing Laites who was able to return to the villa. The two of them remained in a couple until Casa Amor, before she recoupled with Cach Mercer. She later decided to get back together with Solomon and was coupled up with him until he decided to voluntarily leave the villa, and she got back together with Mercer. Laites and Solomon were shown having arguments over his actions with other islanders Helena Ford and Lauren Wood. She gained popularity with the show's viewers due to her quick wit and comebacks, and due to her friendship with Khan and Yasmin Pettet. The trio were often involved in conflict with fellow islanders Ford and Meg Moore, which left viewers to "choose sides" between the two groups. Laites and Mercer went on to be crowned the winners.

In October 2025, Laites revealed she was homeless following her Love Island win as she was having visa issues. Her visa was approved later that month and she officially moved to the United Kingdom.

Since 2025, Laites and fellow Love Island contestant Yasmin Pettet have been ambassadors for Crohn's and Colitis UK.

In 2026, Laites was announced as a contestant in the first full length series of The Celebrity Apprentice. Laites was also announced as a co-host of the new Love Island companion vodcast, The Debrief alongside fellow series 12 finalists Yasmin Pettet and Shakira Khan. Additionally, Laites joined Love Island: Aftersun as a permanent panellist.

== Filmography ==
Key
| † | Denotes films that have not yet been released |

As herself
| Year | Title | Role | Notes | Ref. |
|---|---|---|---|---|
| 2025 | Love Island | Contestant | Series 12 winner | |
| 2025 | This Morning | Guest | 1 episode | |
| 2025 | Loose Women | Guest | 1 episode | |
| 2025 | Big Brother: Late & Live | Guest | 1 episode | |
| 2026 | Love Island: Aftersun | Panellist | Main cast | |
| 2026 | Love Island: The Debrief | Co-host | Main cast | |
| 2026 | The Celebrity Apprentice † | Contestant | Series 1 | |
