= Crohn's and Colitis UK =

British health charity

Crohn's & Colitis UK (formerly NACC) is a UK charity dedicated to Crohn's disease, ulcerative colitis, and other forms of inflammatory bowel disease (IBD). It was founded in 1979 as the National Association for Colitis and Crohn's Disease.

Crohn's & Colitis UK brings together people of all ages who have Crohn's or colitis, their families, and the health professionals involved in their care. These two illnesses are both forms of Iinflammatory bowel disease (IBD) and they affect over 500,000 people in the UK.

Crohn's & Colitis UK provides information and support to enable people to manage their conditions. They work with the UK health sector to improve diagnosis, treatment and management of IBD. They fund research to increase knowledge of the causes and the best treatments for Crohn's and colitis, and they campaign for greater awareness, better services and more support for Crohn's and colitis patients.

== See also ==
- Crohn's and Colitis Canada
- Crohn's & Colitis Foundation of America
- Guts UK
