= Opinion polling for the 2010 United Kingdom general election =

Opinion polling for the 2010 United Kingdom general election was carried out by various organisations to gauge voting intention. Most of the polling companies listed are members of the British Polling Council (BPC) and abide by its disclosure rules. The opinion polls listed range from the previous election on 5 May 2005 to the election on 6 May 2010.

== Graphical summaries ==
Immediately following the previous general election, the Labour Party held a double-digit lead in opinion polls. However, in the latter part of 2005, this lead was eroded somewhat. By December, the Conservative Party showed its first small leads in opinion polls following the controversial 90 days detention proposals and the election of David Cameron as Conservative leader.

In early 2006, opinion polls were increasingly mixed with small leads given alternately to Labour and Conservative. From the 2006 local elections in May, in which Labour suffered significant losses, the Conservatives took a small single-digit lead in opinion polls. This was the first consistent lead of the opinion polls that the Conservatives had enjoyed for 14 years.

Labour regained the lead in June 2007, following the resignation of Tony Blair as prime minister after 10 years and the selection of Gordon Brown as his successor. Brown resisted calls from his party to hold a general election, despite opinion polls suggesting that Labour was capable of being re-elected at this stage.

The Conservatives took the lead once again in November 2007. This grew wider in spring 2008, particularly in response to the onset of the great recession along with the increased unemployment that resulted from it. After a brief narrowing between Labour and the Conservatives in late 2008, the latter's lead widened again following the emergence of the MPs' expenses scandal in 2009. Though Labour slightly recovered in the latter half of 2009, the Conservatives maintained their lead through to election day. In the campaign period, the Liberal Democrats enjoyed a significant and unprecedented surge following the first televised debate of the party leaders, in which their leader Nick Clegg was widely seen as the strongest performer.

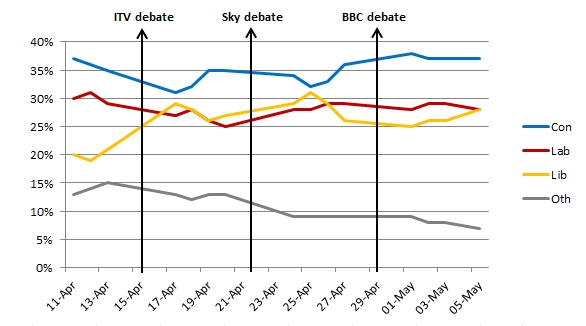

== Guide to tables ==
Poll results are listed in the tables below in reverse chronological order. The highest percentage figure in each poll is displayed in bold, and its background is shaded in the leading party's colour. The "lead" column shows the percentage point difference between the two parties with the highest figures. When a poll result is a tie, the figures with the highest percentages are shaded and displayed in bold.

== National poll results ==
Most national opinion polls do not cover Northern Ireland, which has different major political parties from the rest of the United Kingdom. As mentioned prior, most of the polling companies listed are members of the BPC; however, BPIX is not a BPC member and does not publish detailed methodology and findings.

=== 2010 ===
Date(s) conducted	Pollster	Client	Sample size	Lab	Con	LD	UKIP	SNP	Grn	BNP	Others	Lead
6 May 2010	2010 general election		–	29.7%	**36.9%**	23.6%	3.2%	1.8%	1.0%	2.0%	1.7%	7.2
5 May	Ipsos MORI	Evening Standard	1,216	29%	**36%**	27%	3%	2%	1%	1%	2%	7
4–5 May	YouGov	The Sun	6,483	28%	**35%**	28%	3%	1%	1%	2%	2% PC on 1% Other on 1%	7
4–5 May	Harris Interactive	Daily Mail	4,014	29%	**35%**	27%	–	–	–	–	7%	6
4–5 May	Populus	The Times	2,505	28%	**37%**	27%	2%	2%	1%	2%	2%	9
4–5 May	Angus Reid Public Opinion	PoliticalBetting.com	2,283	24%	**36%**	29%	4%	2%	1%	2%	3% PC on 1% Other on 2%	7
4–5 May	Opinium	Daily Express	1,383	27%	**35%**	26%	–	–	–	–	12%	8
4–5 May	ComRes	ITV News/The Independent	1,025	28%	**37%**	28%	3%	1%	1%	1%	1% PC on <1% Other on <1%	9
3–4 May	ICM	The Guardian	1,527	28%	**36%**	26%	–	–	–	–	10%	8
3–4 May	YouGov	The Sun	1,461	30%	**35%**	24%	5%	2% (Note: Includes Plaid Cymru)	2%	1%	1%	5
29 Apr – 4 May	TNS-BMRB	N/A	1,864	27%	**33%**	29%	3%	2%	2%	2%	2% PC on 1% Other on 1%	4
28 Apr – 4 May	Harris Interactive	The Metro	786	26%	**36%**	28%	–	–	–	–	10%	8
2–3 May	ComRes	ITV News/The Independent	1,024	29%	**37%**	26%	–	–	–	–	8%	8
2–3 May	YouGov	The Sun	1,455	28%	**35%**	28%	3%	2%	1%	2%	1% Rsp on 0% Other on 1%	7
30 Apr – 3 May	Opinium	Daily Express	1,870	28%	**33%**	27%	–	–	–	–	12%	5
1–2 May	YouGov	The Sun	1,475	28%	**34%**	29%	–	–	–	–	9%	5
1–2 May	ComRes	ITV News/The Independent	1,024	29%	**37%**	26%	–	–	–	–	8%	8
30 Apr – 2 May	ICM	The Guardian	1,026	28%	**33%**	28%	4%	3%	2%	1%	3% PC on 1% Other on 2%	5
30 Apr – 1 May	YouGov	The Sunday Times	1,483	27%	**35%**	28%	–	–	–	–	10%	7
30 Apr – 1 May	ComRes	Sunday Mirror/The Independent	1,019	28%	**38%**	25%	–	–	–	–	9%	10
30 Apr	YouGov	The Sun	1,412	28%	**34%**	28%	–	–	–	–	10%	6
30 Apr	ICM	The Sunday Telegraph	1,019	29%	**36%**	27%	3%	2%	1%	–	1%	7
29–30 Apr	Angus Reid Public Opinion	Sunday Express	1,874	23%	**35%**	29%	5%	1%	1%	3%	2% PC on 1% Other on 1%	6
28–29 Apr	YouGov	The Sun	1,623	27%	**34%**	28%	4%	2%	1%	3%	1% Rsp on 0% Other on 1%	6
27–28 Apr	YouGov	The Sun	1,530	27%	**34%**	31%	3%	2%	1%	1%	1% Rsp on 0% Other on 1%	3
26–27 Apr	YouGov	The Sun	1,598	29%	**33%**	28%	–	–	–	–	10%	4
26–27 Apr	ComRes	ITV News/The Independent	1,006	29%	**36%**	26%	–	–	–	–	9%	7
26–27 Apr	Populus	The Times	1,510	27%	**36%**	28%	3%	2%	2%	1%	1% PC on <1% Other on <1%	8
21–27 Apr	TNS-BMRB	N/A	2,078	27%	**34%**	30%	2%	2%	2%	2%	2% PC on 1% Other on 1%	4
25–26 Apr	YouGov	The Sun	1,491	28%	**33%**	29%	3%	3%	2%	2%	1% Rsp on 0% Other on 1%	4
25–26 Apr	ComRes	ITV News/The Independent	1,005	29%	**33%**	29%	3%	1%	2%	1%	1% PC on <1% Other on 1%	4
23–26 Apr	Opinium	Daily Express	1,942	25%	**34%**	28%	–	–	–	–	13%	6
23–26 Apr	Angus Reid Public Opinion	The Economist	2,433	23%	**33%**	30%	5%	1%	2%	2%	4% PC on 1% Other on 3%	3
20–26 Apr	Harris Interactive	The Metro	1,678	25%	**32%**	30%	–	–	–	–	13%	2
24–25 Apr	YouGov	The Sun	1,466	28%	**34%**	30%	3%	2%	1%	2%	1% Rsp on 0% Other on 1%	4
24–25 Apr	ComRes	ITV News/The Independent	1,003	28%	**32%**	31%	–	–	–	–	9%	1
23–25 Apr	ICM	The Guardian	1,031	28%	**33%**	30%	2%	3%	1%	2%	1% PC on <1% Other on 1%	3
23–24 Apr	YouGov	The Sunday Times	1,412	27%	**35%**	28%	4%	2%	1%	2%	1% Rsp on 0% Other on 1%	7
23–24 Apr	ComRes	Sunday Mirror/The Independent on Sunday	1,006	28%	**34%**	29%	3%	2%	1%	2%	1% PC on 1% Other on <1%	5
23 Apr	ICM	The Sunday Telegraph	1,020	26%	**35%**	31%	–	–	–	–	8%	4
23 Apr	Ipsos MORI	News of the World	1,245	30%	**36%**	23%	–	–	–	–	11%	6
22–23 Apr	YouGov	The Sun	1,381	29%	**34%**	29%	3%	2%	1%	1%	1% Rsp on 0% Other on 1%	5
21–22 Apr	YouGov	The Sun	1,576	29%	**34%**	28%	–	–	–	–	9%	5
20–21 Apr	YouGov	The Sun	1,545	27%	**33%**	31%	3%	2%	1%	2%	9%	2
19–20 Apr	YouGov	The Sun	1,595	26%	31%	**34%**	–	–	–	–	9%	3
19–20 Apr	Angus Reid Public Opinion	PoliticalBetting.com	1,953	23%	32%	**33%**	4%	2%	2%	3%	1% PC on 1% Other on 0%	1
19–20 Apr	ComRes	ITV News/The Independent	1,015	25%	**35%**	27%	2%	3%	1%	2%	5% PC on <1% Other on 5%	8
19–20 Apr	Populus	The Times	1,501	28%	**32%**	31%	–	–	–	–	9%	1
18–20 Apr	Ipsos MORI	Evening Standard	1,253	28%	**32%**	**32%**	–	–	–	–	8%	Tie
14–20 Apr	TNS-BMRB	N/A	1,953	29%	**34%**	30%	2%	2%	1%	1%	1% PC on <1% Other on <1%	4
18–19 Apr	ComRes	ITV News/The Independent	1,012	26%	**35%**	26%	1%	2%	1%	2%	7% PC on <1% Other on 7%	9
18–19 Apr	YouGov	The Sun	1,509	27%	**33%**	31%	2%	2%	1%	2%	0% Rsp on 0% Other on 0%	2
16–19 Apr	Opinium	Daily Express	1,957	26%	**32%**	29%	–	–	–	–	13%	3
16–19 Apr	Angus Reid Public Opinion	PoliticalBetting.com	2,004	24%	**32%**	**32%**	4%	2%	2%	2%	2% PC on 1% Other on 1%	Tie
14–19 Apr	Harris Interactive	The Metro	1,792	26%	**31%**	30%	–	–	–	–	13%	1
17–18 Apr	ComRes	ITV News/The Independent	1,003	28%	**32%**	28%	1%	1%	1%	1%	8% PC on <1% Other on 8%	4
17–18 Apr	YouGov	The Sun	1,433	26%	32%	**33%**	3%	2%	1%	2%	1% Rsp on 0% Other on 1%	1
16–18 Apr	ICM	The Guardian	1,024	28%	**33%**	30%	2%	2%	1%	1%	3% PC on 2% Other on 1%	3
16–17 Apr	YouGov	The Sunday Times	1,490	30%	**33%**	29%	–	–	–	–	8%	3
16–17 Apr	ComRes	Sunday Mirror/The Independent on Sunday	1,006	27%	**31%**	29%	1%	1%	<1%	1%	9% PC on 1% Other on 8%	2
15–16 Apr	YouGov	The Sun	1,290	28%	**33%**	30%	–	–	–	–	9%	3
15 Apr	The first ever televised Prime Ministerial debate is held											
15 Apr	ComRes	ITV News	4,032	28%	**35%**	24%	–	–	–	–	13%	7
14–15 Apr	ICM	The Sunday Telegraph	1,033	29%	**34%**	27%	3%	2%	2%	1%	2% PC on 1% Other on 1%	5
14–15 Apr	YouGov	The Sun	1,490	31%	**37%**	22%	4%	2%	1%	2%	1% Rsp on 0% Other on 1%	6
13–14 Apr	YouGov	The Sun	1,578	32%	**41%**	18%	4%	2%	1%	2%	0% Rsp on 0% Other on 0%	9
12–13 Apr	ComRes	ITV News/The Independent	1,001	29%	**35%**	21%	2%	1%	2%	1%	8% PC on <1% Other on 8%	6
12–13 Apr	YouGov	The Sun	1,583	31%	**39%**	20%	4%	2%	1%	2%	1% Rsp on 0% Other on 1%	8
8–13 Apr	Harris Interactive	The Metro	1,523	27%	**36%**	23%	–	–	–	–	14%	9
7–13 Apr	TNS-BMRB	N/A	1,916	33%	**36%**	22%	–	–	–	–	9%	3
12 Apr	Dissolution of Parliament and the official start of the election campaign											
12 Apr	Populus	The Times	1,525	33%	**36%**	21%	3%	1%	2%	3%	1% PC on <1% Other on 1%	3
11–12 Apr	ComRes	ITV News/The Independent	1,002	31%	**36%**	19%	–	–	–	–	14%	5
11–12 Apr	Angus Reid Public Opinion	PoliticalBetting.com	2,006	28%	**38%**	22%	5%	2%	2%	3%	2% PC on 1% Other on 1%	10
11–12 Apr	YouGov	The Sun	1,493	33%	**39%**	20%	2%	3%	1%	2%	0% Rsp on 0% Other on 0%	6
9–12 Apr	Opinium	Daily Express	1,825	31%	**39%**	17%	–	–	–	–	13%	8
10–11 Apr	ComRes	ITV News/The Independent	1,004	30%	**37%**	20%	–	–	–	–	13%	7
10–11 Apr	YouGov	The Sun	1,455	31%	**37%**	20%	4%	3%	2%	2%	1% Rsp on 0% Other on 1%	6
9–11 Apr	ICM	The Guardian	1,024	31%	**37%**	20%	3%	3%	2%	2%	3% PC on 1% Other on 2%	6
9–10 Apr	YouGov	The Sunday Times	1,431	32%	**40%**	18%	4%	2%	1%	2%	0% Rsp on 0% Other on 0%	8
9–10 Apr	ComRes	Sunday Mirror/The Independent on Sunday	1,001	32%	**39%**	16%	2%	–	3%	1%	7%	7
8–9 Apr	YouGov	The Sun	1,527	30%	**40%**	20%	–	–	–	–	10%	10
7–8 Apr	Harris Interactive	Daily Mail	1,012	27%	**37%**	22%	–	–	–	–	14%	10
7–8 Apr	YouGov	The Sun	1,626	31%	**40%**	18%	4%	3%	1%	2%	1% Rsp on 0% Other on 1%	9
7 Apr	ICM	The Sunday Telegraph	1,032	30%	**38%**	21%	–	–	–	–	10%	8
6–7 Apr	YouGov	The Sun	1,484	32%	**37%**	19%	3%	3%	2%	3%	1% Rsp on 0% Other on 1%	5
6–7 Apr	Angus Reid Public Opinion	PoliticalBetting.com	2,193	26%	**37%**	22%	5%	2%	2%	3%	2% PC on 1% Other on 1%	11
6 Apr	Populus	The Times	1,507	32%	**39%**	21%	3%	2%	2%	2%	2% PC on 1% Other on 1%	7
5–6 Apr	YouGov	The Sun	1,456	32%	**40%**	17%	4%	3%	2%	2%	1% Rsp on 0% Other on 1%	8
31 Mar – 6 Apr	Harris Interactive	The Metro	2,080	28%	**37%**	20%	–	–	–	–	15%	9
4–5 Apr	YouGov	The Sun	1,620	31%	**41%**	18%	4%	3%	2%	2%	0% Rsp on 0% Other on 0%	10
2–5 Apr	Opinium	Daily Express	1,903	29%	**39%**	17%	6%	2%	3%	2%	1% PC on 0% Other on 1%	10
1–3 Apr	ICM	The Guardian	1,001	33%	**37%**	21%	2%	2%	2%	2%	2% PC on 1% Other on 1%	4
1–2 Apr	YouGov	The Sunday Times	1,503	29%	**39%**	20%	4%	3%	2%	2%	1% Rsp on 0% Other on 1%	10
31 Mar – 1 Apr	Angus Reid Public Opinion	Sunday Express	1,991	27%	**38%**	20%	5%	–	3%	4%	3%	11
31 Mar – 1 Apr	YouGov	The Sun	1,552	31%	**39%**	19%	5%	2%	2%	1%	1% Rsp on 0% Other on 1%	8
30–31 Mar	ICM	The Guardian	1,003	29%	**38%**	23%	3%	3%	1%	1%	1% PC on <0% Other on 1%	9
30–31 Mar	YouGov	The Sun	1,615	32%	**38%**	19%	4%	2%	2%	2%	1% Rsp on 0% Other on 1%	6
30–31 Mar	Angus Reid Public Opinion	PoliticalBetting.com	2,013	28%	**37%**	22%	5%	2%	2%	3%	1% PC on 0% Other on 1%	9
29–30 Mar	YouGov	The Sun	1,681	31%	**38%**	19%	4%	3%	2%	2%	1% Rsp on 0% Other on 1%	7
24–30 Mar	TNS-BMRB	N/A	1,819	33%	**38%**	19%	–	–	–	–	10%	5
28–29 Mar	YouGov	The Sun	1,614	32%	**39%**	18%	4%	2%	2%	2%	1% Rsp on 0% Other on 1%	7
26–29 Mar	Opinium	Daily Express	1,780	28%	**38%**	18%	–	–	–	–	16%	10
23–29 Mar	Harris Interactive	The Metro	1,133	27%	**37%**	19%	–	–	–	–	17%	10
26–28 Mar	ComRes	The Independent	1,001	30%	**37%**	20%	3%	2%	4%	2%	1% PC on 1% Other on <1%	7
25–26 Mar	YouGov	The Sunday Times	1,533	32%	**37%**	19%	4%	2%	2%	3%	1% Rsp on 0% Other on 1%	5
24–25 Mar	ICM	News of the World	1,003	31%	**39%**	19%	2%	2%	2%	2%	2% PC on 1% Other on 1%	8
24–25 Mar	YouGov	The Sun	1,483	33%	**37%**	18%	3%	3%	1%	3%	1% Rsp on 0% Other on 1%	4
23–24 Mar	YouGov	The Sun	1,554	34%	**36%**	17%	5%	2%	2%	3%	1% Rsp on 0% Other on 1%	2
22–23 Mar	YouGov	The Sun	1,756	33%	**37%**	18%	4%	2%	2%	3%	1% Rsp on 0% Other on 1%	4
21–22 Mar	YouGov	The Sun	1,560	32%	**36%**	20%	3%	3%	2%	2%	1% Rsp on 0% Other on 1%	4
19–22 Mar	Ipsos MORI	Daily Mirror	1,503	30%	**35%**	21%	6%	2%	3%	2%	1%	5
19–22 Mar	Opinium	Daily Express	1,975	30%	**37%**	15%	–	–	–	–	18%	7
17–22 Mar	Harris Interactive	The Metro	2,117	28%	**35%**	17%	–	–	–	–	20%	7
18–19 Mar	YouGov	The Sunday Times	1,547	31%	**38%**	19%	5%	2%	2%	3%	1% Rsp on 0% Other on 1%	7
17–18 Mar	ICM	News of the World	1,002	32%	**38%**	19%	2%	2%	2%	1%	3% PC on 2% Other on 1%	6
17–18 Mar	YouGov	The Sun	1,671	32%	**36%**	20%	4%	3%	1%	3%	1% Rsp on 0% Other on 1%	4
16–17 Mar	YouGov	The Sun	1,676	32%	**36%**	20%	3%	2%	2%	2%	1% Rsp on 0% Other on 1%	4
15–16 Mar	Angus Reid Public Opinion	PoliticalBetting.com	2,003	26%	**39%**	21%	5%	2%	2%	4%	2% PC on 1% Other on 1%	13
15–16 Mar	YouGov	The Sun	1,460	32%	**37%**	19%	3%	3%	2%	3%	1% Rsp on 0% Other on 1%	5
10–16 Mar	Harris Interactive	The Metro	1,934	28%	**36%**	18%	–	–	–	–	18%	8
14–15 Mar	YouGov	The Sun	1,466	32%	**37%**	21%	3%	2%	2%	3%	0% Rsp on 0% Other on 0%	5
12–15 Mar	Opinium	Daily Express	1,951	28%	**39%**	16%	–	–	–	–	17%	11
12–14 Mar	ICM	The Guardian	1,002	31%	**40%**	20%	2%	2%	2%	1%	2% PC on 1% Other on 1%	9
11–12 Mar	YouGov	The Sunday Times	1,507	33%	**37%**	17%	5%	3%	2%	3%	1% Rsp on 0% Other on 1%	4
10–11 Mar	ICM	The Sunday Telegraph	1,007	31%	**38%**	21%	2%	3%	2%	2%	2% PC on 1% Other on 1%	7
10–11 Mar	YouGov	The Sun	1,434	34%	**37%**	17%	5%	2%	2%	3%	0% Rsp on 0% Other on 0%	3
9–10 Mar	YouGov	The Sun	1,473	32%	**37%**	17%	4%	3%	2%	4%	1% Rsp on 0% Other on 1%	5
9–10 Mar	Angus Reid Public Opinion	PoliticalBetting.com	2,003	26%	**39%**	18%	6%	3%	3%	3%	2% PC on 1% Other on 1%	13
8–9 Mar	YouGov	The Sun	1,524	32%	**36%**	20%	4%	3%	2%	3%	1% Rsp on 0% Other on 1%	4
7–8 Mar	YouGov	The Sun	1,747	34%	**39%**	16%	4%	3%	2%	2%	1% Rsp on 0% Other on 1%	5
5–8 Mar	Opinium	Daily Express	1,960	30%	**37%**	16%	–	–	–	–	16%	7
3–8 Mar	Harris Interactive	The Metro	1,498	29%	**37%**	18%	–	–	–	–	16%	8
4–5 Mar	YouGov	The Sunday Times	1,558	33%	**38%**	17%	3%	4%	2%	2%	1% Rsp on 0% Other on 1%	5
3–4 Mar	ICM	News of the World	1,005	31%	**40%**	18%	3%	2%	3%	1%	2% PC on 1% Other on 1%	9
3–4 Mar	YouGov	The Sun	1,640	32%	**38%**	17%	4%	3%	2%	3%	1% Rsp on 0% Other on 1%	6
2–3 Mar	YouGov	The Sun	1,661	32%	**38%**	19%	4%	3%	2%	3%	1% Rsp on 0% Other on 1%	6
25 Feb – 3 Mar	TNS-BMRB	N/A	1,973	31%	**39%**	19%	2%	3%	3%	3%	1% PC on 1% Other on <1%	8
1–2 Mar	YouGov	The Sun	1,479	33%	**38%**	16%	4%	3%	3%	3%	1% Rsp on 0% Other on 1%	5
28 Feb – 1 Mar	YouGov	The Sun	1,505	32%	**39%**	17%	4%	2%	2%	2%	1% Rsp on 0% Other on 1%	7
26–28 Feb	ComRes	The Independent	1,005	32%	**37%**	19%	2%	3%	3%	3%	2% PC on 1% Other on 1%	5
25–26 Feb	YouGov	The Sunday Times	1,436	35%	**37%**	17%	4%	2%	2%	3%	1% Rsp on 0% Other on 1%	2
24–25 Feb	YouGov	The Sun	1,472	33%	**39%**	16%	5%	2%	3%	2%	1% Rsp on 0% Other on 1%	6
23–24 Feb	YouGov	The Sun	1,473	32%	**38%**	19%	3%	3%	1%	2%	10%	6
18–24 Feb	TNS-BMRB	N/A	1,954	32%	**36%**	21%	–	–	–	–	12%	4
22–23 Feb	YouGov	The Sun	1,469	32%	**38%**	17%	4%	2%	2%	3%	1% Rsp on 0% Other on 1%	6
21–22 Feb	YouGov	The Sun	1,578	33%	**39%**	17%	3%	2%	2%	3%	1% Rsp on 0% Other on 1%	6
19–22 Feb	Ipsos MORI	The Daily Telegraph	1,533	32%	**37%**	19%	2%	3%	2%	2%	1%	5
16–22 Feb	Harris Interactive	The Metro	918	30%	**39%**	22%	–	–	–	–	9%	9
19–21 Feb	ICM	The Guardian	1,004	30%	**37%**	20%	3%	4%	3%	2%	1% PC on 1% Other on <1%	7
18–19 Feb	YouGov	The Sunday Times	1,472	33%	**39%**	17%	4%	2%	2%	2%	1% Rsp on 0% Other on 1%	6
16–19 Feb	Angus Reid Public Opinion	PoliticalBetting.com	4,004	26%	**38%**	19%	6%	2%	3%	4%	2% PC 1% Other 1%	12
17–18 Feb	YouGov	The Sun	1,558	32%	**39%**	18%	4%	3%	2%	2%	0% Rsp on 0% Other on 0%	7
17–18 Feb	ComRes	Theos	1,085	30%	**38%**	20%	2%	3%	3%	2%	1% PC on 1% Other on <1%	8
16–17 Feb	Angus Reid Public Opinion	PoliticalBetting.com	2,002	26%	**40%**	18%	6%	2%	2%	4%	2% PC on 1% Other on 1%	14
16–17 Feb	YouGov	The Sun	2,145	30%	**39%**	18%	5%	3%	2%	3%	1% Rsp on 0% Other on 1%	9
10–11 Feb	ComRes	The Independent	1,009	29%	**40%**	21%	2%	3%	3%	2%	2% PC on 1% Other on 1%	11
9–10 Feb	Angus Reid Public Opinion	PoliticalBetting.com	2,002	25%	**38%**	20%	6%	2%	3%	3%	2% PC on 1% Other on 1%	13
5–7 Feb	Populus	The Times	1,502	30%	**40%**	20%	2%	2%	4%	1%	2% PC on 1% Other on 1%	10
3–4 Feb	ICM	The Sunday Telegraph	1,001	30%	**39%**	20%	1%	3%	2%	3%	1% PC on <1% Other on 1%	9
29–31 Jan	ComRes	The Independent	1,001	31%	**38%**	19%	4%	2%	3%	2%	2% PC on 1% Other on 1%	7
29–30 Jan	BPIX (Note: Pollster is not a member of the British Polling Council.)	Mail on Sunday	1,524	30%	**39%**	18%	–	–	–	–	13%	9
28–29 Jan	YouGov	The Daily Telegraph	2,054	31%	**38%**	19%	3%	3%	3%	3%	1% Rsp on 0% Other on 1%	7
26–28 Jan	YouGov	The People	2,044	31%	**40%**	18%	3%	4%	2%	2%	1% Rsp on 0% Other on 1%	9
26–28 Jan	Ipsos MORI	Daily Mirror	1,001	32%	**40%**	16%	–	–	–	–	12%	8
26–27 Jan	Angus Reid Public Opinion	PoliticalBetting.com	2,004	24%	**40%**	19%	5%	2%	3%	4%	2% PC on 1% Other on 1%	16
22–24 Jan	ICM	The Guardian	1,000	29%	**40%**	21%	2%	3%	3%	1%	1% PC on 1% Other on <1%	11
20–21 Jan	ComRes	Sunday Mirror	1,004	29%	**38%**	19%	–	–	–	–	14%	9
14–15 Jan	YouGov	The Sunday Times	2,033	31%	**40%**	18%	3%	3%	2%	3%	1% Rsp on 0% Other on 1%	9
13–14 Jan	ComRes	The Independent on Sunday	1,005	29%	**42%**	19%	–	–	–	–	10%	13
9–10 Jan	Angus Reid Strategies	PoliticalBetting.com	2,010	24%	**40%**	20%	–	–	–	–	17%	16
8–10 Jan	Populus	The Times	1,509	28%	**41%**	19%	–	–	–	–	12%	13
6–10 Jan	ICM	The Sunday Telegraph	1,003	30%	**40%**	18%	3%	3%	3%	2%	2% PC on 1% Other on 1%	10
6–7 Jan	YouGov	The Sun	2,832	30%	**42%**	16%	4%	3%	2%	3%	1% Rsp on 0% Other on 1%	12
5–6 Jan	YouGov	The Sun	4,167	31%	**40%**	17%	4%	3%	2%	3%	1% Rsp on 0% Other on 1%	9

=== 2009 ===
Date(s) conducted	Pollster	Client	Sample size	Lab	Con	LD	UKIP	SNP	Grn	BNP	Others	Lead
29–30 Dec	YouGov	The Daily Telegraph	1,848	30%	40%	17%	3%	2%	3%	3%	1% Rsp on 0% Other on 1%	10
19–20 Dec	ComRes	The Independent	1,006	29%	38%	19%	4%	3%	3%	2%	1% PC on 1% Other on <1%	9
16–18 Dec	Angus Reid Strategies	PoliticalBetting.com	2,010	24%	40%	20%	6%	1%	3%	3%	2% PC on 1% Other on 1%	16
15–17 Dec	YouGov	The People	2,052	28%	40%	18%	5%	2%	3%	4%	1% Rsp on 0% Other on 1%	12
11–13 Dec	ICM	The Guardian	1,009	31%	40%	18%	3%	2%	2%	3%	3% PC on 1% Other on 2%	9
11–13 Dec	Ipsos MORI	The Observer	1,017	26%	43%	20%	4%	2%	3%	2%	2% PC on 1% Other on 1%	17
10–11 Dec	YouGov	The Sunday Times	2,044	31%	40%	16%	4%	3%	2%	3%	1% Rsp on 0% Other on 1%	9
9–10 Dec	ComRes	The Independent on Sunday	1,001	24%	41%	21%	–	–	–	–	14%	17
8–10 Dec	Angus Reid Strategies	PoliticalBetting.com	2,002	23%	40%	19%	7%	3%	3%	4%	2% PC on 1% Other on 1%	17
4–6 Dec	Populus	The Times	1,505	30%	38%	20%	4%	3%	3%	2%	1% PC on 1% Other on <1%	8
3–4 Dec	YouGov	The Sunday Times	2,095	27%	40%	18%	5%	3%	3%	3%	1% Rsp on 0% Other on 1%	13
2–3 Dec	ICM	The Sunday Telegraph	1,001	29%	40%	19%	3%	3%	3%	2%	2% PC on 1% Other on 1%	11
27–29 Nov	ComRes	The Independent	1,003	27%	37%	20%	6%	3%	4%	1%	3% PC on 1% Other on 2%	10
24–26 Nov	YouGov	The Daily Telegraph	2,004	29%	39%	19%	4%	3%	2%	3%	1% Rsp on 0% Other on 1%	10
20–23 Nov	Angus Reid Strategies	PoliticalBetting.com	2,004	22%	39%	21%	6%	2%	3%	5%	2% PC on 1% Other on 1%	17
13–15 Nov	Ipsos MORI	The Observer	1,006	31%	37%	17%	3%	2%	3%	2%	3% PC on 1% Other on 2%	6
13–15 Nov	ICM	The Guardian	1,010	29%	42%	19%	2%	4%	2%	–	3% PC on 1% Other on 2%	13
12–13 Nov	YouGov	The Sunday Times	2,026	27%	41%	18%	4%	3%	3%	3%	1% Rsp on 0% Other on 1%	14
12 Nov	Glasgow North East by-election (Lab gain from Spk) (Note: Michael Martin was originally elected as Labour, but resigned his party membership upon becoming Speaker in 2000, as per Parliamentary custom.)											
11–12 Nov	ComRes	The Independent on Sunday	1,007	25%	39%	17%	–	–	–	–	19%	14
6–8 Nov	Populus	The Times	1,504	29%	39%	18%	4%	2%	4%	2%	2% PC on 1% Other on 1%	10
4–6 Nov	Angus Reid Strategies	PoliticalBetting.com	2,000	24%	38%	20%	–	–	–	–	17%	14
4–5 Nov	YouGov	Channel 4 News	1,021	27%	41%	17%	–	–	–	–	16%	14
28–29 Oct	ICM	The Sunday Telegraph	1,007	25%	42%	21%	2%	3%	4%	2%	2% PC on 1% Other on 1%	17
27–29 Oct	YouGov	The Daily Telegraph	2,024	28%	41%	16%	4%	3%	3%	4%	1% Rsp on 0% Other on 1%	13
23–25 Oct	ComRes	The Independent	1,004	27%	40%	18%	–	–	–	–	15%	13
22–23 Oct	YouGov	The Daily Telegraph	1,314	27%	40%	19%	4%	3%	2%	3%	1% Rsp on 0% Other on 1%	13
16–18 Oct	ICM	The Guardian	1,002	27%	44%	18%	3%	2%	2%	–	5% PC on 1% Other on 4%	17
16–18 Oct	Ipsos MORI	N/A	996	26%	43%	19%	2%	3%	2%	1%	3% PC on 1% Other on 2%	17
15–16 Oct	Angus Reid Strategies	PoliticalBetting.com	2,077	23%	40%	20%	–	–	–	–	15%	17
15–16 Oct	YouGov	The Sunday Times	2,025	30%	41%	17%	4%	3%	2%	2%	1% Rsp on 0% Other on 1%	11
14–15 Oct	ComRes	The Independent on Sunday	1,008	28%	40%	19%	2%	1%	5%	1%	3% PC on 2% Other on 1%	12
9–11 Oct	Populus	The Times	1,509	30%	40%	18%	2%	2%	4%	2%	2% PC on 1% Other on 1%	10
8–9 Oct	YouGov	The Sun	2,161	28%	42%	18%	4%	3%	2%	2%	0% Rsp on 0% Other on 0%	14
8–9 Oct	YouGov	Sky News	1,064	27%	44%	17%	–	–	–	–	12%	17
7–9 Oct	ICM	News of the World	1,008	26%	45%	18%	3%	2%	2%	–	2% PC on <1% Other on 3%	19
7–8 Oct	YouGov	Sky News	1,074	31%	40%	18%	–	–	–	–	11%	9
6–7 Oct	YouGov	Sky News	1,039	29%	43%	17%	–	–	–	–	11%	14
5–6 Oct	YouGov	Sky News	1,223	28%	41%	18%	–	–	–	–	13%	13
4–5 Oct	YouGov	Sky News	1,102	27%	40%	20%	–	–	–	–	13%	13
3 Oct	YouGov	The People	2,027	28%	40%	18%	–	–	–	–	14%	12
1–2 Oct	YouGov	Sky News	1,053	29%	41%	17%	–	–	–	–	13%	12
30 Sep – 1 Oct	ComRes	The Independent on Sunday	1,022	28%	40%	19%	–	–	–	–	13%	12
30 Sep – 1 Oct	YouGov	Sky News	1,085	26%	40%	20%	–	–	–	–	15%	14
29–30 Sep	YouGov	Sky News	1,078	30%	37%	21%	–	–	–	–	12%	7
28–29 Sep	YouGov	Sky News	1,024	29%	40%	18%	–	–	–	–	13%	11
27–28 Sep	YouGov	Sky News	1,051	29%	39%	20%	4%	3%	2%	2%	2% Rsp on 0% Other on 2%	10
25–27 Sep	Ipsos MORI	N/A	1,003	24%	36%	25%	4%	3%	3%	1%	4%	11
25–27 Sep	ComRes	The Independent	1,003	23%	38%	23%	–	–	–	–	16%	15
24–25 Sep	YouGov	Sky News	1,059	24%	40%	21%	–	–	–	–	14%	16
23–24 Sep	YouGov	Sky News	1,057	25%	38%	23%	–	–	–	–	14%	13
23–24 Sep	ICM	News of the World	1,003	26%	40%	23%	2%	3%	3%	3%	<1% PC on <1%	14
22–24 Sep	YouGov	The Daily Telegraph	2,026	26%	39%	20%	4%	4%	3%	3%	1% Rsp on 0% Other on 1%	13
22–23 Sep	YouGov	Sky News	1,036	28%	38%	19%	–	–	–	–	15%	10
21–22 Sep	YouGov	Sky News	1,062	27%	39%	20%	–	–	–	–	13%	12
20–21 Sep	YouGov	Sky News	1,081	30%	39%	17%	4%	3%	4%	3%	1% Rsp on 0% Other on 1%	9
18–20 Sep	ICM	The Guardian	1,001	26%	43%	19%	4%	2%	3%	1%	2% PC on 1% Other on 1%	17
11–13 Sep	Populus	The Times	1,506	27%	41%	18%	2%	3%	4%	3%	3% PC on 1% Other on 2%	14
10–11 Sep	YouGov	The Sunday Times	2,009	27%	41%	17%	–	–	–	–	15%	14
4–6 Sep	ComRes	The Independent	1,005	24%	40%	21%	4%	2%	6%	2%	1% PC on <1% Other on 1%	16
4–6 Sep	YouGov	The Daily Telegraph	1,573	27%	40%	18%	–	–	–	–	15%	13
27–28 Aug	YouGov	The Sun	1,996	28%	42%	17%	5%	3%	2%	3%	1% Rsp on 0% Other on 1%	14
25–27 Aug	YouGov	The Daily Telegraph	2,199	26%	42%	18%	5%	3%	2%	3%	1% Rsp on 0% Other on 1%	16
21–23 Aug	Ipsos MORI	N/A	1,013	26%	43%	17%	4%	2%	4%	1%	2% PC on <1% Other on 2%	17
21–23 Aug	ICM	The Guardian	1,004	25%	41%	19%	3%	5%	3%	3%	1%	16
19–20 Aug	ComRes	The Independent on Sunday	1,013	24%	41%	18%	5%	3%	4%	3%	1%	17
13–14 Aug	YouGov	The Sunday Times	2,007	28%	42%	18%	–	–	–	–	13%	14
12–13 Aug	ICM	Sunday Mirror	1,005	26%	43%	19%	3%	3%	2%	1%	2% PC on 2%	17
28–30 Jul	YouGov	The Daily Telegraph	2,334	27%	41%	18%	6%	3%	3%	2%	1% Rsp on 0% Other on 1%	14
24–26 Jul	ComRes	The Independent	1,008	24%	42%	18%	–	–	–	–	16%	18
23 Jul	Norwich North by-election (Con gain from Lab)											
21–23 Jul	YouGov	The People	2,218	25%	40%	20%	5%	3%	3%	4%	1% Rsp on 0% Other on 1%	15
17–19 Jul	Ipsos MORI	N/A	1,012	24%	40%	18%	5%	2%	5%	3%	3% PC on 1% Other on 2%	16
17–19 Jul	Populus	The Times	1,504	26%	38%	20%	5%	3%	5%	3%	1% PC on 1%	12
16–17 Jul	YouGov	The Sunday Times	1,956	25%	42%	18%	6%	3%	4%	2%	1% Rsp on 0% Other on 1%	17
15–16 Jul	ComRes	The Independent on Sunday	1,010	23%	38%	22%	–	–	–	–	16%	15
10–11 Jul	ICM	The Guardian	1,000	27%	41%	20%	3%	2%	4%	2%	2% PC on 1% Other on 1%	14
1–3 Jul	YouGov	Fabian Society	2,001	26%	39%	19%	6%	3%	4%	3%	1% Rsp on 0% Other on 1%	13
26–28 Jun	ComRes	The Independent	1,007	25%	36%	19%	6%	4%	7%	1%	2% PC on 1% Other on 1%	11
24–26 Jun	YouGov	The People	2,017	24%	40%	17%	6%	3%	3%	4%	2% Rsp on 0% Other on 2%	16
23–25 Jun	YouGov	The Daily Telegraph	2,233	25%	38%	18%	7%	3%	4%	3%	1% Rsp on 0% Other on 1%	13
19–21 Jun	Ipsos MORI	N/A	1,004	21%	38%	19%	8%	3%	5%	5%	2%	17
17–18 Jun	ComRes	The Independent on Sunday	1,012	22%	39%	18%	–	–	–	–	21%	17
10–17 Jun	Harris Interactive	The Metro	2,081	20%	35%	16%	–	–	–	–	29%	15
12–14 Jun	Ipsos MORI	UNISON	1,252	25%	39%	19%	6%	3%	4%	2%	2%	14
12–14 Jun	ICM	The Guardian	1,006	27%	39%	18%	6%	3%	4%	1%	2% PC on 1% Other on 1%	12
11–12 Jun	YouGov	The Sunday Times	1,902	24%	40%	18%	8%	4%	4%	3%	1% Rsp on 0% Other on 1%	16
9–10 Jun	Populus	The Times	1,001	24%	36%	19%	7%	2%	5%	2%	4% PC on 2% Other on 2%	12
5–7 Jun	ComRes	The Independent	1,001	22%	38%	20%	–	–		–	20%	16
4 Jun	Local elections in England; European Parliament election											
2–3 Jun	YouGov	The Daily Telegraph	4,014	21%	37%	19%	8%	4%	5%	4%	3% Rsp on 0% Other on 3%	16
29–31 May	ComRes	The Independent	1,005	22%	30%	18%	7%	2%	8%	3%	10% PC on 1% Other on 9%	8
29–31 May	Ipsos MORI	N/A	1,001	18%	40%	18%	7%	–	6%	4%	7%	22
27–29 May	YouGov	The Daily Telegraph	5,016	22%	39%	18%	7%	3%	4%	5%	2% Rsp on 0% Other on 2%	17
27–28 May	ICM	The Sunday Telegraph	1,013	22%	40%	25%	4%	2%	3%	–	4% PC on 1% Other on 3%	15
27–28 May	Populus	The Times	1,001	21%	41%	15%	8%	3%	5%	4%	3% PC on 1% Other on 2%	20
19–20 May	Populus	ITV News	1,000	27%	39%	17%	6%	4%	2%	4%	3% PC on 1% Other on 2%	12
15–17 May	ICM	The Guardian	1,002	28%	39%	20%	5%	3%	3%	4%	<1% PC on <1%	11
14–16 May	YouGov	The Daily Telegraph	2,235	23%	39%	19%	6%	4%	4%	4%	1% Rsp on 0% Other on 1%	16
13–14 May	ComRes	The Independent on Sunday	1,010	21%	40%	18%	–	–	–	–	21%	19
13–14 May	YouGov	The Sun	1,814	22%	41%	19%	6%	4%	3%	4%	1% Rsp on 0% Other on 1%	19
8–10 May	Populus	The Times	1,504	26%	39%	22%	3%	3%	2%	3%	2% PC on 1% Other on 1%	13
8–9 May	BPIX	Mail on Sunday	Unknown	23%	45%	17%	–	–	–	–	15%	22
7–8 May	YouGov	The Sunday Times	2,209	27%	43%	18%	3%	3%	2%	3%	1% Rsp on 0% Other on 1%	16
24–26 Apr	ComRes	The Independent	1,003	26%	45%	17%	<1%	3%	2%	2%	4% PC on 1% Other on 3%	19
23–24 Apr	YouGov	Sunday People	1,855	27%	45%	17%	–	–	–	–	12%	18
22–23 Apr	YouGov	The Daily Telegraph	1,896	27%	45%	18%	–	–	–	–	10%	18
17–19 Apr	Ipsos MORI	N/A	1,011	28%	41%	22%	1%	3%	2%	1%	2%	13
17–19 Apr	ICM	The Guardian	1,005	30%	40%	19%	2%	3%	3%	–	3% PC on 1% Other on 2%	10
15–16 Apr	Marketing Sciences	The Sunday Telegraph	1,007	26%	43%	21%	–	–	–	–	10%	17
3–5 Apr	Populus	The Times	1,512	30%	43%	18%	2%	3%	1%	2%	2% PC on 1% Other on 1%	13
3–4 Apr	YouGov	The Sunday Times	2,125	34%	41%	16%	–	–	–	–	10%	7
27–29 Mar	ComRes	The Independent	1,002	28%	40%	18%	–	–	–	–	14%	12
25–26 Mar	ICM	The Sunday Telegraph	1,003	31%	44%	18%	1%	3%	1%	–	3% PC on 1% Other on 2%	13
24–26 Mar	YouGov	The Daily Telegraph	2,104	31%	41%	17%	–	–	–	–	11%	10
18–19 Mar	ComRes	The Independent on Sunday	1,002	30%	41%	17%	2%	3%	3%	1%	3% PC on <1% Other on 3%	11
13–15 Mar	ICM	The Guardian	1,004	30%	42%	20%	<1%	3%	3%	–	8%	12
13–15 Mar	Ipsos MORI	N/A	1,007	32%	42%	14%	1%	4%	3%	–	4%	10
12–13 Mar	YouGov	The Sunday Times	1,840	31%	41%	17%	–	–	–	–	11%	10
6–8 Mar	Populus	The Times	1,504	30%	42%	19%	1%	4%	3%	1%	2% PC on 1% Other on 1%	12
27 Feb – 1 Mar	ComRes	The Independent	1,006	28%	44%	17%	1%	3%	2%	2%	4% PC on 1% Other on 3%	16
24–26 Feb	YouGov	The Daily Telegraph	2,063	31%	41%	15%	2%	4%	2%	4%	2% Rsp on 0% Other on 1%	10
20–22 Feb	ICM	The Guardian	1,004	30%	42%	18%	2%	3%	1%	–	5% PC on 2% Other on 3%	12
13–15 Feb	Ipsos MORI	N/A	1,001	28%	48%	17%	1%	2%	1%	–	3%	20
12–13 Feb	YouGov	The Sunday Times	1,711	32%	44%	14%	–	–	–	–	10%	12
11–12 Feb	ComRes	The Independent on Sunday	1,002	25%	41%	22%	–	–	–	–	12%	16
6–8 Feb	Populus	The Times	1,504	28%	42%	18%	2%	4%	2%	2%	2% PC on 1% Other on 1%	14
4–5 Feb	ICM	The Sunday Telegraph	1,010	28%	40%	22%	1%	3%	2%	–	4% PC on 2% Other on 2%	12
27–29 Jan	YouGov	The Daily Telegraph	2,338	32%	43%	16%	–	–	–	–	10%	11
23–25 Jan	ICM	The Guardian	1,003	32%	44%	16%	1%	3%	2%	–	3% PC on 1% Other on 2%	12
21–22 Jan	ComRes	The Independent	1,012	28%	43%	16%	–	–	–	–	13%	15
16–18 Jan	Ipsos MORI	N/A	1,005	30%	44%	17%	1%	4%	2%	–	2%	14
15–16 Jan	YouGov	The Sunday Times	2,077	32%	45%	14%	–	–	–	–	9%	13
14–15 Jan	ComRes	The Independent on Sunday	1,009	32%	41%	15%	–	–	–	–	12%	9
9–11 Jan	Populus	The Times	1,500	33%	43%	15%	1%	3%	3%	2%	1% PC on 1% Other on 1%	10
7–8 Jan	YouGov	The Sun	1,835	34%	41%	15%	–	–	–	–	10%	7

=== 2008 ===
Date(s) conducted	Pollster	Client	Sample size	Lab	Con	LD	UKIP	SNP	Grn	BNP	Others	Lead
19–21 Dec	ComRes	The Independent	1,000	34%	**39%**	16%	–	–	–	–	11%	5
16–18 Dec	YouGov	The Daily Telegraph	2,241	35%	**42%**	14%	1%	4%	2%	2%	1% Rsp on 0% Other on 1%	7
12–14 Dec	Ipsos MORI	N/A	1,000	35%	**39%**	15%	–	–	–	–	11%	4
12–14 Dec	ICM	The Guardian	1,003	33%	**38%**	19%	1%	3%	3%	–	3% PC on 2% Other on 1%	5
11–12 Dec	YouGov	The Sunday Times	2,098	35%	**41%**	15%	2%	4%	1%	2%	1% Rsp on 0% Other on 1%	6
10–11 Dec	ComRes	The Independent on Sunday	1,003	36%	**37%**	14%	–	–	–	–	12%	1
10–11 Dec	Ipsos MORI	N/A	1,007	36%	**41%**	11%	–	–	–	–	12%	5
5–7 Dec	Populus	The Times	1,505	35%	**39%**	17%	1%	3%	1%	1%	3%	4
28–30 Nov	ComRes	The Independent	1,005	36%	**37%**	17%	1%	3%	2%	1%	3% PC on 1% Other on 2%	1
27–28 Nov	Ipsos MORI	The Observer	1,017	32%	**43%**	15%	–	–	–	–	10%	11
25–26 Nov	ICM	The Guardian	1,027	30%	**45%**	18%	–	–	–	–	7%	15
24–25 Nov	YouGov	The Daily Telegraph	1,556	36%	**40%**	14%	2%	4%	1%	3%	1% Rsp on 0% Other on 1%	4
19–20 Nov	ICM	Sunday Mirror	1,010	31%	**42%**	19%	1%	3%	1%	–	2% PC on 1% Other on 1%	11
14–16 Nov	Ipsos MORI	N/A	1,002	37%	**40%**	12%	–	–	–	–	11%	3
13–14 Nov	YouGov	The Sunday Times	2,080	36%	**41%**	14%	2%	3%	1%	3%	1% Rsp on 0% Other on 1%	5
12–13 Nov	ComRes	The Independent on Sunday	1,010	32%	**43%**	12%	–	–	–	–	13%	11
7–9 Nov	Populus	The Times	1,503	35%	**41%**	16%	1%	2%	2%	1%	2% PC on 1% Other on 1%	6
5–6 Nov	ICM	The Sunday Telegraph	1,005	30%	**43%**	18%	1%	3%	3%	–	3% PC on 1% Other on 2%	13
6 Nov	Glenrothes by-election (Lab hold)											
2 Nov	BPIX	N/A	?	31%	**45%**	13%	–	–	–	–	11%	14
27–29 Oct	YouGov	The Daily Telegraph	2,271	33%	**42%**	15%	2%	4%	1%	2%	1% Rsp on 0% Other on 1%	9
24–26 Oct	ComRes	The Independent	1,001	31%	**39%**	16%	–	–	–	–	14%	8
17–19 Oct	Ipsos MORI	N/A	1,004	30%	**45%**	14%	–	–	–	–	11%	15
17–19 Oct	ICM	The Guardian	1,007	30%	**42%**	21%	<1%	3%	1%	–	2%	12
16–18 Oct	BPIX	N/A	2,046	30%	**46%**	13%	–	–	–	–	11%	16
15–17 Oct	YouGov	The Daily Mirror	2,029	34%	**42%**	14%	–	–	–	–	10%	8
15–16 Oct	ComRes	The Independent on Sunday	1,005	31%	**40%**	16%	–	–	–	–	14%	9
9–10 Oct	YouGov	The Sunday Times	1,941	33%	**43%**	14%	–	–	–	–	10%	10
3–5 Oct	Populus	The Times	1,503	30%	**45%**	15%	1%	4%	2%	2%	2% PC on 1% Other on 1%	15
1–3 Oct	YouGov	The Daily Telegraph	2,048	31%	**45%**	15%	–	–	–	–	9%	14
26–28 Sep	ComRes	The Independent	1,017	29%	**41%**	18%	–	–	–	–	12%	12
24–26 Sep	BPIX	N/A	2,020	31%	**43%**	17%					9%	12
24–25 Sep	ICM	The Guardian	1,012	32%	**41%**	18%					9%	9
23–24 Sep	YouGov	The Sun	1,536	31%	**41%**	16%					12%	10
17–18 Sep	ComRes	The Independent on Sunday	1,010	27%	**39%**	21%					12%	12
17–19 Sep	YouGov	The Daily Telegraph	2,227	24%	**44%**	20%					12%	20
12–14 Sep	Ipsos MORI	N/A	1,017	24%	**52%**	12%					12%	28
10–12 Sep	YouGov	The Sunday Times	2,161	27%	**46%**	16%					11%	19
3–4 Sep	ComRes	The Independent	1,013	25%	**44%**	17%					14%	19
29–31 Aug	Populus	The Times	1,506	27%	**43%**	18%					12%	16
26–27 Aug	YouGov	The Daily Telegraph	2,267	26%	**45%**	16%					13%	19
20–21 Aug	ComRes	The Independent	1,014	25%	**46%**	16%					13%	21
15–17 Aug	ICM	The Guardian	1,002	29%	**44%**	19%					8%	15
15–17 Aug	Ipsos MORI	N/A	1,005	24%	**48%**	16%					12%	24
14–15 Aug	YouGov	The Sunday Times	1,745	25%	**45%**	18%					12%	20
6–8 Aug	YouGov	News of the World	2,031	26%	**46%**	17%					11%	20
31 Jul – 2 Aug	BPIX	N/A	1,333	24%	**47%**	16%					13%	23
30 Jul – 1 Aug	ICM	Sunday Express	1,001	29%	**45%**	16%					10%	16
29–31 Jul	YouGov	The Daily Telegraph	1,949	25%	**47%**	16%					12%	22
25–27 Jul	Populus	The Times	1,002	27%	**43%**	18%					12%	16
23–25 Jul	YouGov	The Daily Telegraph	2,120	26%	**45%**	17%					12%	19
23–24 Jul	ComRes	The Independent	1,021	24%	**46%**	18%					12%	22
24 Jul	Glasgow East by-election (SNP gain from Lab)											
18–20 Jul	Ipsos MORI	N/A	1,016	27%	**47%**	15%					11%	20
18–20 Jul	ICM	The Guardian	1,007	28%	**43%**	19%					10%	15
16–17 Jul	ComRes	The Independent on Sunday	1,016	24%	**45%**	16%					15%	21
10–11 Jul	YouGov	The Sunday Times	1,832	25%	**47%**	16%					12%	22
10 Jul	Haltemprice and Howden by-election (Con hold)											
4–6 Jul	Populus	The Times	1,507	28%	**41%**	19%					12%	13
25–26 Jun	ComRes	The Independent	1,007	25%	**46%**	18%					11%	21
23–25 Jun	YouGov	The Daily Telegraph	2,163	28%	**46%**	15%					11%	18
26 Jun	Henley by-election (Con hold)											
20–22 Jun	ICM	The Guardian	1,000	25%	**45%**	20%					10%	20
18–20 Jun	BPIX	N/A	2,385	26%	**49%**	14%					11%	23
13–15 Jun	Ipsos MORI	N/A	1,012	28%	**45%**	16%					11%	17
11–12 Jun	ComRes	The Independent on Sunday	1,012	26%	**44%**	17%					13%	18
12–13 Jun	YouGov	The Sunday Times	1,769	25%	**47%**	18%					10%	22
6–8 Jun	Populus	The Times	1,508	25%	**45%**	20%					10%	20
4–5 Jun	ICM	The Sunday Telegraph	1,023	26%	**42%**	21%					11%	16
30 May – 1 Jun	ComRes	The Independent	1,006	30%	**44%**	16%					10%	14
27–29 May	YouGov	The Daily Telegraph	2,241	23%	**47%**	18%					12%	24
22 May	Crewe and Nantwich by-election (Con gain from Lab)											
16–18 May	ICM	The Guardian	1,008	27%	**41%**	22%					10%	14
15–16 May	YouGov	The Sunday Times	1,854	25%	**45%**	18%					12%	20
14–15 May	ComRes	The Independent on Sunday	1,004	26%	**43%**	19%					12%	17
7–8 May	YouGov	The Sun	1,571	23%	**49%**	17%					11%	26
2–4 May	Populus	The Times	1,509	29%	**40%**	19%					11%	11
1 May	Local elections in England and Wales											
25–27 Apr	ComRes	The Independent	1,005	26%	**40%**	20%					14%	14
23–24 Apr	ICM	The Sunday Telegraph	1,010	29%	**39%**	20%					12%	10
21–23 Apr	YouGov	The Daily Telegraph	2,073	26%	**44%**	17%					13%	18
17–22 Apr	Ipsos-MORI	The Observer	1,059	31%	**40%**	19%					10%	9
18–20 Apr	ICM/The Guardian	N/A	1,000	34%	**39%**	19%					8%	5
16–17 Apr	Populus	Sunday Mirror	1,006	30%	**40%**	19%					11%	10
10–11 Apr	YouGov	The Sunday Times	1,755	28%	**44%**	17%					11%	16
8–10 Apr	Populus	The Times	1,502	33%	**39%**	17%					6%	6
2–3 Apr	ICM	The Sunday Telegraph	1,010	32%	**43%**	18%					7%	11
28–30 Mar	ComRes	The Independent	1,004	31%	**38%**	17%					14%	7
25–27 Mar	YouGov	The Daily Telegraph	1,926	29%	**43%**	17%					11%	14
13–18 Mar	Ipsos MORI	N/A	1,983	35%	**40%**	18%					7%	5
14–16 Mar	ICM	The Guardian	1,003	29%	**42%**	21%					8%	13
13–14 Mar	YouGov	The Sunday Times	2,311	27%	**43%**	16%					13%	16
12–13 Mar	ICM	News of the World	1,002	31%	**40%**	20%					9%	9
7–9 Mar	Populus	The Times	1,502	34%	**37%**	19%					10%	3
25–27 Feb	YouGov	The Daily Telegraph	2,011	33%	**40%**	16%					11%	7
21–26 Feb	Ipsos MORI	N/A	2,063	37%	**39%**	16%					8%	2
22–24 Feb	ComRes	The Independent	1,010	30%	**41%**	17%					12%	11
18–20 Feb	YouGov/The Economist	The Economist	2,118	34%	**40%**	16%					11%	6
15–17 Feb	ICM	The Guardian	1,003	34%	**37%**	21%					8%	3
14–15 Feb	YouGov	The Sunday Times	2,469	32%	**41%**	16%					11%	9
1–3 Feb	Populus	The Times	1,504	31%	**40%**	17%					12%	9
30–31 Jan	ICM	The Sunday Telegraph	1,012	32%	**37%**	21%					10%	5
25–27 Jan	ComRes	The Independent	1,003	30%	**38%**	17%					15%	8
21–23 Jan	YouGov	The Daily Telegraph	1,992	33%	**41%**	16%					10%	8
17–22 Jan	Ipsos MORI	N/A	2,045	**38%**	37%	16%					9%	1
18–20 Jan	ICM	The Guardian	1,009	35%	**37%**	20%					8%	2
10–11 Jan	YouGov	The Sunday Times	2,139	33%	**43%**	14%					11%	10
9–10 Jan	ICM	The Sunday Telegraph	1,011	33%	**40%**	18%					9%	7
9–10 Jan	Ipsos MORI	The Sun	1,006	32%	**42%**	15%					11%	10
4–6 Jan	Populus	The Times	1,509	33%	**37%**	19%					11%	4

=== 2007 ===
Date(s) Conducted	Pollster	Client	Sample size	Lab	Con	LD	Others	Lead
18–19 Dec	ICM	The Guardian	1,034	34%	**39%**	18%	9%	5
17–19 Dec	YouGov	The Daily Telegraph	2,060	31%	**43%**	16%	11%	12
18 Dec	Nick Clegg is elected leader of the Liberal Democrats							
14–16 Dec	ComRes	The Independent	1,004	30%	**41%**	16%	12%	11
13–14 Dec	YouGov	The Sunday Times	1,481	32%	**45%**	14%	10%	13
7–9 Dec	Populus	The Times	1,506	32%	**40%**	16%	11%	8
29 Nov – 7 Dec	Ipsos MORI	N/A	1,859	35%	**42%**	14%	9%	7
28–29 Nov	ICM	News of the World	1,011	30%	**41%**	19%	10%	11
26–29 Nov	YouGov	The Daily Telegraph	4,004	32%	**43%**	14%	11%	11
23–27 Nov	Ipsos MORI	N/A	1,933	32%	**41%**	17%	10%	9
23–25 Nov	ComRes	The Independent	1,009	27%	**41%**	18%	15%	13
21–22 Nov	ICM	The Guardian	1,005	31%	**37%**	21%	10%	6
21–22 Nov	YouGov	Channel 4 News	1,600	32%	**41%**	14%	13%	9
14–16 Nov	YouGov	The Sunday Times	1,983	35%	**41%**	13%	11%	6
8–10 Nov	ICM	Sunday Express	1,001	35%	**43%**	15%	7%	8
2–4 Nov	Populus	The Times	1,503	**37%**	36%	16%	11%	1
31 Oct – 1 Nov	Ipsos MORI	The Sun	1,013	35%	**40%**	13%	12%	5
26–28 Oct	ICM	The Guardian	1,011	35%	**40%**	18%	7%	5
26–28 Oct	ComRes	The Independent	1,002	33%	**42%**	15%	10%	8
22–24 Oct	YouGov	The Daily Telegraph	2,105	38%	**41%**	11%	10%	3
18–23 Oct	Ipsos MORI	The Observer	1,987	**41%**	40%	13%	6%	1
15 Oct	Menzies Campbell resigns as leader of the Liberal Democrats							
10–11 Oct	ICM	The Sunday Telegraph	1,010	36%	**43%**	14%	8%	7
10 Oct	Ipsos MORI	The Sun	1,007	38%	**41%**	11%	10%	3
5–6 Oct	YouGov	The Sunday Times	1,757	38%	**41%**	11%	10%	3
5–7 Oct	Populus	The Times	1,008	**40%**	38%	12%	10%	2
3–4 Oct	YouGov	Channel 4 News	1,741	**40%**	36%	13%	11%	4
3–4 Oct	ICM	The Guardian		**38%**	**38%**	16%	8%	Tie
2–3 Oct	Populus	The Times	1,000	**39%**	36%	15%	10%	3
26–28 Sep	YouGov	The Daily Telegraph	2,165	**43%**	32%	15%	10%	11
27–28 Sep	Ipsos MORI	The Observer	1,000	**41%**	34%	16%	9%	7
26–27 Sep	Populus	The Times	1,002	**41%**	31%	17%	10%	10
20–26 Sep	Ipsos MORI	N/A	1,964	**44%**	31%	15%	10%	13
24–25 Sep	YouGov	Channel 4 News	1,341	**44%**	33%	13%	11%	11
20–22 Sep	Ipsos MORI	The Sun	1,009	**42%**	34%	14%	10%	8
19–21 Sep	YouGov	The Daily Telegraph	2,085	**39%**	33%	16%	12%	6
19–20 Sep	ICM	Sunday Mirror	1,029	**39%**	33%	19%	9%	6
13–16 Sep	ICM	The Guardian	1,005	**40%**	32%	20%	8%	8
13–14 Sep	YouGov	The Sunday Times	1,942	**39%**	34%	15%	12%	5
11–12 Sep	ComRes	The Independent	1,005	**37%**	34%	15%	14%	3
31 Aug – 2 Sep	Populus	The Times	1,506	**37%**	36%	18%	9%	1
29–31 Aug	YouGov	GMTV	2,154	**38%**	35%	15%	12%	3
29–30 Aug	ComRes	The Independent	1,016	35%	**36%**	14%	14%	1
23–29 Aug	Ipsos MORI	The Sun	1,941	**41%**	36%	16%	7%	5
25–28 Aug	Populus	Conservative Party	530	**37%**	36%	16%	10%	1
24–28 Aug	YouGov	The Daily Telegraph	2,266	**41%**	33%	14%	12%	8
22–23 Aug	ICM	The Guardian	1,016	**39%**	34%	18%	9%	5
9–10 Aug	YouGov	The Sunday Times	1,966	**42%**	32%	14%	12%	10
8–10 Aug	ICM	Sunday Mirror	1,007	**39%**	33%	18%	10%	6
8–9 Aug	Ipsos MORI	The Sun	531	**38%**	33%	15%	14%	5
27–29 Jul	Populus	The Times	1,511	**39%**	33%	15%	13%	6
27–29 Jul	Communicate	The Independent	1,006	**37%**	34%	16%	14%	3
23–25 Jul	YouGov	The Daily Telegraph	1,877	**41%**	32%	16%	11%	9
20–22 Jul	ICM	The Guardian	1,005	**38%**	32%	20%	10%	6
19–20 Jul	YouGov	The Sunday Times	1,664	**40%**	33%	15%	12%	7
19 Jul	Ealing Southall by-election and Sedgefield by-election (both Lab holds)							
12–17 Jul	Ipsos MORI	The Observer	1,919	**41%**	35%	15%	9%	6
4–5 Jul	ICM	Sunday Mirror	1,006	**37%**	35%	17%	10%	2
1 Jul	Populus	The Times	1,504	**37%**	34%	18%	11%	3
28–29 Jun	YouGov	The Daily Telegraph	1,886	**38%**	35%	15%	12%	3
27–28 Jun	ICM	The Guardian	1,005	**39%**	35%	18%	8%	4
24–27 Jun	Gordon Brown is elected leader of the Labour Party and subsequently becomes Prime Minister							
22–24 Jun	Communicate	The Independent	1,005	32%	**37%**	18%	13%	5
14–20 Jun	Ipsos MORI	The Observer	1,970	**39%**	36%	15%	10%	3
14–15 Jun	YouGov	The Sunday Times	1,753	35%	**37%**	14%	14%	2
1–3 Jun	Populus	N/A	1,503	33%	**36%**	17%	14%	3
30–31 May	ICM	The Sunday Telegraph	1,014	32%	**37%**	21%	10%	5
25–28 May	Communicate	The Independent	1,003	31%	**35%**	19%	15%	4
21–23 May	YouGov	The Daily Telegraph	2,050	33%	**39%**	15%	13%	6
18–20 May	ICM	The Guardian	1,003	32%	**34%**	21%	12%	2
11–13 May	Populus	The Times	1,504	33%	**37%**	17%	13%	4
10–11 May	YouGov	The Sunday Times	1,962	34%	**38%**	15%	14%	4
10 May	Tony Blair announces his pending resignation as leader of the Labour Party and Prime Minister							
3 May	Local elections in England and Scotland; Scottish Parliament election; National Assembly for Wales election							
23–25 Apr	YouGov	The Daily Telegraph	2,019	32%	**37%**	18%	14%	5
19–25 Apr	Ipsos MORI	The Observer	1,163	31%	**38%**	20%	11%	7
20–22 Apr	ICM	The Guardian	1,005	30%	**37%**	21%	12%	7
13–15 Apr	Populus	The Times	1,503	29%	**37%**	20%	14%	8
4–5 Apr	YouGov	The Sunday Times	2,218	31%	**39%**	16%	14%	8
26–28 Mar	YouGov	The Daily Telegraph	2,042	32%	**39%**	17%	13%	7
23–25 Mar	Communicate	N/A	1,002	31%	**35%**	20%	14%	4
21–22 Mar	YouGov	The Daily Telegraph	2,752	31%	**39%**	16%	14%	8
16–18 Mar	ICM	The Guardian	1,011	31%	**41%**	18%	10%	10
15–16 Mar	YouGov	The Sunday Times	1,897	32%	**38%**	16%	14%	6
9–15 Mar	Ipsos MORI	N/A	1,983	33%	**41%**	17%	9%	8
2–4 Mar	Populus	The Times	1,509	30%	**38%**	18%	14%	8
23–25 Feb	Communicate	N/A	1,001	29%	**40%**	17%	14%	11
19–21 Feb	YouGov	The Daily Telegraph	2,292	32%	**37%**	17%	14%	5
16–18 Feb	ICM	The Guardian	1,000	31%	**40%**	19%	10%	9
8–9 Feb	YouGov	The Sunday Times	2,019	32%	**37%**	18%	14%	5
2–4 Feb	Populus	The Times	1,509	33%	**36%**	19%	12%	3
19–29 Jan	Ipsos MORI	N/A	949	35%	**39%**	19%	7%	4
26–28 Jan	Communicate	N/A	1,008	29%	**34%**	21%	16%	5
22–24 Jan	YouGov	The Daily Telegraph	2,245	31%	**38%**	18%	13%	7
19–21 Jan	ICM	The Guardian	1,004	31%	**37%**	23%	9%	6
5–7 Jan	Populus	The Times	1,507	32%	**39%**	18%	11%	7

=== 2006 ===
Date(s) conducted	Pollster	Client	Sample size	Lab	Con	LD	UKIP	SNP	Grn	BNP	Others	Lead
20–22 Dec	YouGov	The Sunday Times	1,918	32%	**37%**	15%	–	–	–	–	15%	5
18–20 Dec	YouGov	The Daily Telegraph	1,874	33%	**37%**	17%	3%	4%	1%	4%	1% Rsp: 0% Ver: 0% Other: 1%	4
19–20 Dec	ComRes	The Independent	1,009	**37%**	36%	14%	–	–	–	–	14%	1
15–17 Dec	ICM	The Guardian	1,006	32%	**40%**	18%	1%	2%	3%	–	2%	8
7–12 Dec	Ipsos MORI	N/A	1,938	36%	**37%**	18%	–	–	–	–	9%	1
8–10 Dec	Populus	The Times	1,513	33%	**34%**	19%	2%	3%	4%	2%	4% PC: 1% NL: <1% Rsp: <1% SA: <1% Other: 3%	1
28–30 Nov	YouGov	The Daily Telegraph	1,979	32%	**37%**	16%	3%	4%	3%	3%	2% Rsp: 1% Ver: 0% Other: 1%	5
29–30 Nov	ICM	News of the World	1,006	31%	**39%**	20%	1%	3%	2%	–	4% PC: 1% Other: 3%	8
24–26 Nov	ComRes	The Independent	1,004	**36%**	34%	17%	–	–	–	–	12%	2
17–19 Nov	ICM	The Guardian	1,000	32%	**37%**	22%	1%	3%	2%	–	3% PC: <1% Other: 3%	5
9–14 Nov	Ipsos MORI	The Observer	1,115	33%	**35%**	20%	–	–	–	–	12%	2
3–5 Nov	Populus	The Times	1,510	33%	**36%**	20%	1%	2%	3%	2%	3% PC: 1% NL: <1% Rsp: <1% SA: <1% SSP: 0% Other: 2%	3
24–26 Oct	YouGov	The Daily Telegraph	1,722	32%	**39%**	16%	4%	2%	2%	3%	1% Rsp: 0% Ver: 0% Other: 1%	7
20–22 Oct	ComRes	Independent on Sunday	977	32%	**38%**	14%	–	–	–	–	16%	6
20–22 Oct	ICM	The Guardian	1,019	29%	**39%**	22%	2%	2%	1%	–	3% PC: 1% Other: 2%	10
12–16 Oct	Ipsos MORI	Financial Times	1,113	**37%**	35%	18%	–	–	–	–	10%	2
6–8 Oct	Populus	The Times	1,515	35%	**36%**	18%	1%	2%	4%	1%	2% PC: 1% NL: <1% Rsp: <1% SA: <1% SSP: <1% Other: 1%	1
4–5 Oct	ICM	The Sunday Telegraph	1,005	32%	**38%**	20%	1%	2%	3%	–	4% PC: 1% Other: 3%	6
28–30 Sep	ICM	Sunday Mirror	1,029	35%	**36%**	19%	3%	2%	2%	–	5% PC: 1% Other: 4%	1
27–29 Sep	YouGov	The Daily Telegraph	1,849	**36%**	**36%**	16%	–	–	–	–	12%	Tie
21–22 Sep	YouGov	The Sunday Times	1,546	33%	**37%**	18%	–	–	–	–	12%	4
19–22 Sep	YouGov	The Daily Telegraph	1,733	31%	**38%**	18%	4%	3%	2%	3%	1% Rsp: 0% Other: 1%	7
19–20 Sep	ICM	The Guardian	1,066	32%	**36%**	22%	1%	3%	2%	–	3% PC: 1% Other: 2%	4
13–14 Sep	ICM	Sunday Mirror	1,003	33%	**37%**	21%	1%	4%	2%	–	3% PC: <1% Other: 3%	4
13–14 Sep	YouGov	The Sun	1,519	31%	**38%**	18%	–	–	–	–	14%	7
9 Sep (Note: End date of fieldwork; full dates not given.)	BPIX	Mail on Sunday	–	30%	**40%**	14%	–	–	–	–	16%	10
6–7 Sep	YouGov	The Daily Telegraph	1,504	32%	**40%**	17%	–	–	–	–	11%	8
31 Aug – 6 Sep	Ipsos MORI	The Sunday Times	1,886	**36%**	35%	19%	–	–	–	–	10%	1
1–3 Sep	Populus	The Times	1,504	32%	**36%**	20%	1%	3%	3%	1%	5% PC: 1% SA: 1% SSP: <1% Rsp: <1% NL: <1% Other: 2%	4
22–24 Aug	YouGov	The Daily Telegraph	1,757	31%	**38%**	18%	–	–	–	–	13%	7
18–20 Aug	ICM	The Guardian	1,007	31%	**40%**	22%	<1%	2%	2%	–	3% PC: 1% Other: 2%	9
24–26 Jul	YouGov	The Daily Telegraph	1,633	33%	**38%**	18%	–	–	–	–	11%	5
20–24 Jul	Ipsos MORI	Financial Times	1,897	32%	**36%**	24%	–	–	–	–	8%	4
21–23 Jul	ICM	The Guardian	1,001	35%	**39%**	17%	1%	4%	2%	–	2% PC: <1% Other: 2%	4
7–9 Jul	Populus	The Times	1,512	34%	**36%**	19%	1%	4%	4%	1%	4% PC: 1% Rsp: <1% SA: <1% SSP: <1% Ver: <1% Other: 1%	2
6–8 Jul	BPIX	Mail on Sunday	–	31%	**41%**	15%	–	–	–	–	13%	10
29 Jun	Blaenau Gwent by-election (BGPV gain from Ind) and Bromley & Chislehurst by-election (Con hold)											
28–29 Jun	ICM	The Sunday Telegraph	1,003	35%	**36%**	18%	1%	2%	5%	–	5% PC: 1% Other: 4%	1
26–28 Jun	YouGov	The Daily Telegraph	1,962	33%	**39%**	18%	–	–	–	–	10%	6
20–26 Jun	Ipsos MORI	N/A	1,931	33%	**36%**	21%	–	–	–	–	10%	3
21–23 Jun	YouGov	The Daily Telegraph	2,009	32%	**39%**	17%	–	–	–	–	12%	7
16–18 Jun	ICM	The Guardian	1,005	32%	**37%**	21%	–	–	–	–	9%	5
8–12 Jun	Ipsos MORI	The Observer	1,975	34%	**41%**	18%	–	–	–	–	7%	7
2–4 Jun	Populus	The Times	1,505	34%	**37%**	18%	1%	2%	4%	2%	2% PC: <1% SA: <1% SSP: <1% Rsp: <1% Other: 2%	3
25–30 May	Ipsos MORI	The Sun	1,984	31%	**41%**	18%	–	–	–	–	10%	10
23–25 May	YouGov	The Daily Telegraph	2,102	32%	**38%**	16%	4%	3%	3%	4%	0% Rsp: 0% Ver: 0% Other: 0%	6
19–21 May	ICM	The Guardian	1,001	34%	**38%**	20%	1%	3%	3%	1%	<1% PC: <1% Other: <1%	4
8–9 May	YouGov	The Daily Telegraph	1,910	31%	**37%**	17%	3%	2%	3%	6%	1% Rsp: 0% Ver: 0% Other: 1%	6
5–7 May	Populus	The Times	1,516	30%	**38%**	20%	<1%	3%	3%	3%	3% PC: 1% SSP: <1% Rsp: <1% NL: 0% Other: 2%	8
4 May	Local elections in England											
27 Apr – 2 May	Ipsos MORI	Financial Times	1,078	32%	**36%**	21%	–	–	–	–	11%	4
28–29 Apr (Note: Projected date by PollBase; exact fieldwork dates not available.)	BPIX	Mail on Sunday	–	32%	**35%**	19%	–	–	–	5%	9%	3
27–28 Apr	YouGov	The Sunday Times	1,930	32%	**35%**	18%	3%	2%	3%	6%	1% Rsp: 0% Ver: 0% Other: 1%	3
21–23 Apr	ICM	The Guardian	1,006	32%	**34%**	24%	1%	4%	2%	2%	1% PC: <1% Other: 1%	2
20–22 Apr	Ipsos MORI	The Sun	1,006	**30%**	**30%**	25%	–	–	–	–	15%	Tie
18–20 Apr	YouGov	The Daily Telegraph	2,075	**35%**	33%	17%	3%	2%	2%	7%	1% Rsp: 0% Other: 1%	2
6–8 Apr (Note: Projected date by PollBase; exact fieldwork dates not available.)	BPIX	Mail on Sunday	–	36%	**37%**	17%	–	–	–	–	10%	1
5–6 Apr	ICM	Channel 4	1,009	**35%**	**35%**	21%	–	–	–	–	9%	Tie
31 Mar – 2 Apr	Populus	The Times	1,503	**36%**	34%	21%	1%	3%	3%	1%	2% PC: 1% SSP: <1% NL: <1% Rsp: 0% Other: 1%	2
27–29 Mar	YouGov	The Daily Telegraph	1,873	**36%**	**36%**	18%	–	–	–	–	10%	Tie
16–21 Mar	Ipsos MORI	N/A	1,155	**39%**	34%	19%	–	–	–	–	8%	5
16–18 Mar	ICM	The Sunday Telegraph	1,003	**37%**	33%	21%	1%	3%	3%	–	2% PC: 1% Other: 1%	4
16–17 Mar	YouGov	The Sunday Times	1,811	35%	**38%**	19%	–	–	–	–	8%	3
10–12 Mar	ICM	The Guardian	1,006	**37%**	34%	21%	1%	2%	2%	–	3% PC: 1% Other: 2%	3
3–5 Mar	Populus	The Times	1,509	**35%**	**35%**	20%	1%	2%	2%	1%	4% PC: 1% Ver: 1% Rsp: <1% SA: <1% SSP: <1% Other: 2%	Tie
3–4 Mar	BPIX	Mail on Sunday	–	37%	**39%**	16%	–	–	–	–	8%	2
2 Mar	Menzies Campbell is elected leader of the Liberal Democrats											
21–22 Feb	YouGov	The Daily Telegraph	2,019	36%	**38%**	18%	–	–	–	–	9%	2
16–20 Feb	Ipsos MORI	The Sun	1,143	**38%**	35%	20%	–	–	–	–	7%	3
17–19 Feb	ICM	The Guardian	1,002	34%	**37%**	21%	1%	3%	2%	–	3% PC: 1% Other: 2%	3
9–10 Feb	YouGov	The Sunday Times	1,617	**39%**	37%	15%	–	–	–	–	10%	2
9 Feb	Dunfermline and West Fife by-election (LD gain from Lab)											
3–5 Feb	Populus	The Times	1,508	36%	**37%**	18%	1%	3%	2%	1%	3% PC: 1% Rsp: <1% SA: <1% SSP: <1% Ver: <1% NL: 0% Other: 1%	1
26–28 Jan	ICM	The Sunday Telegraph	1,041	36%	**37%**	19%	–	3%	1%	–	3% PC: 2% Other: 1%	1
24–26 Jan	YouGov	The Daily Telegraph	2,096	**40%**	39%	13%	–	–	–	–	9%	1
19–23 Jan	Ipsos MORI	Financial Times	1,163	38%	**40%**	17%	–	–	–	–	5%	2
20–22 Jan	ICM	The Guardian	1,009	36%	**37%**	19%	–	3%	1%	–	3% PC: 2% Other: 1%	1
12–17 Jan	Ipsos MORI	The Sun	541	**39%**	**39%**	15%	–	–	–	–	7%	Tie
11–12 Jan	ICM	News of the World	1,015	35%	**39%**	20%	–	–	–	–	5%	4
6–8 Jan	Populus	The Times	1,509	**39%**	36%	16%	1%	2%	2%	1%	3% PC: 1% Rsp: <1% SA: <1% SSP: <1% Ver: <1% Other: 1%	3
7 Jan	Charles Kennedy resigns as leader of the Liberal Democrats											
5–7 Jan	BPIX	Mail on Sunday	–	**38%**	**38%**	16%	–	–	–	–	8%	Tie

=== 2005 ===
Date(s) conducted	Pollster	Client	Sample size	Lab	Con	LD	UKIP	SNP	Grn	Others	Lead
15–18 Dec	ICM	The Guardian	1,004	36%	**37%**	21%	1%	3%	1%	2% PC on 1% Other on 1%	1
13–15 Dec	YouGov	The Daily Telegraph	2,071	36%	**38%**	18%	–	–	–	8%	2
9–12 Dec	Ipsos MORI	The Observer	1,000	31%	**40%**	20%	–	–	–	9%	9
9–11 Dec	Populus	The Times	1,521	**38%**	35%	19%	1%	1%	1%	4% BNP: 1% PC: <1% SA: <1% SSP: <1% Rsp: <1% Other: 2%	3
8–9 Dec	BPIX	Mail on Sunday	–	**38%**	37%	17%	–	–	–	8%	1
7–8 Dec	ICM	The Guardian	1,003	35%	**37%**	21%	<1%	2%	1%	3% PC on 1% Other on 2%	2
6–8 Dec	YouGov	The Sunday Times	2,089	36%	**37%**	18%	–	–	–	8%	1
6 Dec	David Cameron is elected leader of the Conservative Party										
5–6 Dec	YouGov	Sky News	1,612	**36%**	**36%**	18%	–	–	–	10%	Tie
22–24 Nov	YouGov	The Daily Telegraph	2,616	**37%**	35%	20%	–	–	–	8%	2
17–22 Nov	Ipsos MORI	N/A	1,089	**42%**	32%	19%	–	–	–	7%	10
18–20 Nov	ICM	The Guardian	1,013	**38%**	33%	19%	1%	2%	3%	3% PC on 2% Other on 1%	5
4–6 Nov	Populus	The Times	1,512	**40%**	32%	19%	<1%	2%	2%	4% BNP: 1% PC: 1% SA: <1% SSP: <1% Rsp: 0% Other: 2%	8
2–3 Nov	ICM	The Sunday Telegraph	1,010	**39%**	33%	21%	1%	3%	1%	2% PC on <1% Other on 2%	6
2 Nov (Note: Projected date by PollBase; exact fieldwork dates not available.)	BPIX	Mail on Sunday	–	**37%**	35%	20%	–	–	–	8%	2
25–27 Oct	YouGov	The Daily Telegraph	1,947	**40%**	32%	19%	–	–	–	9%	8
20–25 Oct	Ipsos MORI	N/A	1,904	**40%**	34%	21%	–	–	–	5%	6
19–20 Oct	ICM	The Guardian	1,007	**36%**	33%	22%	1%	3%	2%	2% PC on 1% Other on 1%	3
15 Oct	BPIX	N/A	–	**41%**	33%	18%	–	–	–	8%	8
7–9 Oct	Populus	The Times	1,509	**40%**	30%	21%	1%	3%	2%	4% PC: 1% BNP: 1% SSP: <1% Rsp: 0% Other: 2%	10
5–6 Oct	ICM	News of the World	1,015	**38%**	32%	22%	1%	2%	1%	3% PC on 1% Other on 2%	5
29 Sep	Livingston by-election (Lab hold)										
27–29 Sep	YouGov	The Daily Telegraph	2,183	**40%**	32%	20%	–	–	–	9%	8
22–26 Sep	MORI	N/A	1,132	**39%**	29%	25%	–	–	–	7%	10
16–17 Sep	ICM	The Guardian	1,013	**40%**	31%	21%	1%	2%	2%	4% PC on 1% Other on 3%	9
8–9 Sep	YouGov	The Sunday Times	1,856	**37%**	32%	21%	–	–	–	10%	5
2–4 Sep	Populus	The Times	1,506	**37%**	35%	20%	1%	2%	2%	3% PC: 1% BNP: <1% SSP: <1% Rsp: <1% Other: 1%	2
19–24 Aug	YouGov	The Daily Telegraph	–	**40%**	33%	20%	–	–	–	7%	7
11–15 Aug	MORI	N/A	1,191	**39%**	31%	24%	–	–	–	6%	8
12–14 Aug	ICM	The Guardian	1,006	**38%**	31%	22%	1%	3%	2%	3% PC on 2% Other on 1%	7
26–28 Jul	YouGov	The Daily Telegraph	–	**40%**	31%	21%	–	–	–	8%	9
22–24 Jul	Populus	The Times	1,506	**40%**	28%	22%	2%	2%	2%	4% PC on 2% BNP: 1% Other on 1%	12
14–18 Jul	MORI	The Observer	1,227	**41%**	28%	25%	–	–	–	6%	13
15–17 Jul	ICM	The Guardian	1,005	**39%**	31%	23%	1%	3%	1%	3% PC on 1% Other on 2%	8
14 Jul	Cheadle by-election (LD hold)										
28–30 Jun	YouGov	The Daily Telegraph	3,717	**38%**	33%	20%	–	–	–	9%	5
16–20 Jun	MORI	Social Research Institute	1,227	**42%**	29%	21%	–	–	–	8%	13
17–19 Jun	ICM	The Guardian	1,005	**38%**	31%	23%	1%	3%	2%	2% PC on <1% Other on 2%	7
24–26 May	YouGov	The Daily Telegraph	–	**38%**	31%	23%	–	–	–	8%	7
19–23 May	MORI	First Tuesday	–	**40%**	27%	26%	–	–	–	7%	13
19–23 May	MORI	Financial Times	1,274	**37%**	30%	26%	–	–	–	7%	7
5 May 2005	2005 general election		–	**36.2%**	33.2%	22.7%	2.3%	1.6%	1.0%	3.0%	3.0

== Seat projections ==
326 seats were required for a majority in the House of Commons.

Date(s) conducted	Pollster	Client	Sample size	Lab	Con	LD	Others	Majority
6 May 2010	2010 general election		–	258	306	57	29	Hung (Con −20)
5 May 2010	Ipsos MORI (Note: Calculated from seat change figures.)	Evening Standard	1,216	261	277	79	15 (Note: Figure does not include the 18 seats in Northern Ireland.)	Hung (Con −49)
4–5 May 2010	ComRes	ITV News/The Independent	1,025	233	299	87	13 (Note: Figure does not include the 18 seats in Northern Ireland.)	Hung (Con −27)
29 Apr – 4 May 2010	TNS-BMRB	N/A	1,864	204	292	114	22 (Note: Figure does not include the 18 seats in Northern Ireland.)	Hung (Con −34)
28 Apr – 4 May 2010	Harris Interactive	The Metro	786	250	290	78	14 (Note: Figure does not include the 18 seats in Northern Ireland.)	Hung (Con −36)
2–3 May 2010	ComRes	ITV News/The Independent	1,024	251	294	74	13 (Note: Figure does not include the 18 seats in Northern Ireland.)	Hung (Con −32)
1–2 May 2010	ComRes	ITV News/The Independent	1,024	251	294	74	13 (Note: Figure does not include the 18 seats in Northern Ireland.)	Hung (Con −32)
30 Apr – 1 May 2010	ComRes	Sunday Mirror/The Independent	1,019	236	315	69	12 (Note: Figure does not include the 18 seats in Northern Ireland.)	Hung (Con −11)
26–27 Apr 2010	ComRes	ITV News/The Independent	1,006	259	282	77	14 (Note: Figure does not include the 18 seats in Northern Ireland.)	Hung (Con −44)
25–26 Apr 2010	ComRes	ITV News/The Independent	1,024	277	248	93	14 (Note: Figure does not include the 18 seats in Northern Ireland.)	Hung (Lab −49)
20–26 Apr 2010	Harris Interactive	The Metro	1,678	246	259	113	14 (Note: Figure does not include the 18 seats in Northern Ireland.)	Hung (Con −67)
24–25 Apr 2010	ComRes	ITV News/The Independent	1,003	268	238	112	14 (Note: Figure does not include the 18 seats in Northern Ireland.)	Hung (Lab −58)
23–24 Apr 2010	ComRes	Sunday Mirror/The Independent on Sunday	1,006	254	271	93	14 (Note: Figure does not include the 18 seats in Northern Ireland.)	Hung (Con −55)
19–20 Apr 2010	Angus Reid Public Opinion	PoliticalBetting.com	1,953	160	270	186	16 (Note: Figure does not include the 18 seats in Northern Ireland.)	Hung (Con −56)
19–20 Apr 2010	ComRes	ITV News/The Independent	1,015	226	301	91	14 (Note: Figure does not include the 18 seats in Northern Ireland.)	Hung (Con −25)
18–19 Apr 2010	ComRes	ITV News/The Independent	1,012	233	299	86	14 (Note: Figure does not include the 18 seats in Northern Ireland.)	Hung (Con −27)
16–19 Apr 2010	Angus Reid Public Opinion	PoliticalBetting.com	2,004	193	271	153	15 (Note: Figure does not include the 18 seats in Northern Ireland.)	Hung (Con −55)
17–18 Apr 2010	ComRes	ITV News/The Independent	1,003	279	245	94	14 (Note: Figure does not include the 18 seats in Northern Ireland.)	Hung (Lab −47)
12–13 Apr 2010	ComRes	ITV News/The Independent	1,001	270	286	61	15 (Note: Figure does not include the 18 seats in Northern Ireland.)	Hung (Con −40)
11–12 Apr 2010	ComRes	ITV News/The Independent	1,002	283	281	53	15 (Note: Figure does not include the 18 seats in Northern Ireland.)	Hung (Lab −43)
10–11 Apr 2010	ComRes	ITV News/The Independent	1,004	266	295	57	14 (Note: Figure does not include the 18 seats in Northern Ireland.)	Hung (Con −31)
26–28 Feb 2010	ComRes	The Independent	1,005	294	277	46	33	Hung (Lab −32)
26–28 Jan 2010	Ipsos MORI	Daily Mirror	1,001	268	317	31	16 (Note: Figure does not include the 18 seats in Northern Ireland.)	Hung (Con −9)
11–21 Sep 2009	YouGov	PoliticsHome	33,610	199	**360**	55	36	Con 70
22 Jul – 4 Aug 2008	YouGov	PoliticsHome	34,634	160	**398**	44	48	Con 146
5 May 2005	2005 general election (Note: 324 seats were needed for a majority at the 2005 general election. Boundary changes took effect in 2010 increasing the number of seats from 646 to 650; as a result, the majority threshold was raised from 324 to 326.)		–	**355**	198	62	31	Lab 66

== Exit poll ==
An exit poll, collected by Ipsos MORI and GfK NOP for the BBC, ITN and Sky News, was published at 22:00 at the end of voting. Data was gathered from 130 polling stations across the country.

Parties	Seats	Change
Conservative Party	307	▲97
Labour Party	255	▼94
Liberal Democrats	59	▼3
Others (Note: This includes the 18 seats in Northern Ireland.)	29	Steady
Hung Parliament (Conservatives 19 seats short of majority)

Initial reaction to the exit poll by various commentators was of surprise at the apparent poor prospects for the Liberal Democrats because it was odds with many opinion polls undertaken in the previous weeks. However, the actual results showed that the exit poll was a good predictor.

A later BBC forecast (05:36 BST) predicted the Conservatives on 306, 20 short of an overall majority, Labour on 262, and Liberal Democrats on 55.

== Sub-national poll results ==
=== Scotland ===
Date(s) conducted	Pollster	Client	Sample size	Lab	LD	SNP	Con	Others	Lead
6 May 2010	2010 general election		–	**42.0%**	18.9%	19.9%	16.7%	2.5%	22.1
3 May 2010	YouGov	The Scotsman	1,507	**37%**	22%	21%	17%	3%	15
21–27 Apr 2010	TNS-BMRB	Scottish Mail on Sunday	1,029	**44%**	16%	23%	13%	4%	21
23–26 Apr 2010	Populus	The Times	1,000	**37%**	24%	19%	16%	4%	13
14–17 Apr 2010	Ipsos MORI	STV	1,005	**36%**	20%	26%	14%	4%	10
24–26 Mar 2010	YouGov	Scottish Mail on Sunday	1,008	**37%**	14%	24%	18%	7%	13
3–10 Mar 2010	YouGov	The Scottish Sun	720	**39%**	12%	26%	18%	5%	13
24 Feb – 3 Mar 2010	YouGov	The Scottish Sun	821	**39%**	14%	24%	18%	5%	15
24–26 Feb 2010	YouGov	The Scotsman	1,002	**35%**	15%	24%	20%	6%	11
24–26 Feb 2010	YouGov	Scottish Mail on Sunday	1,002	**38%**	15%	21%	20%	6%	17
17–24 Feb 2010	YouGov	The Scottish Sun	667	**42%**	14%	20%	19%	5%	22
18–21 Feb 2010	Ipsos MORI	–	1,006	**34%**	12%	32%	17%	5%	2
15–17 Feb 2010	YouGov	The Scottish Sun	562	**37%**	15%	21%	21%	6%	16
19–23 Nov 2009	Ipsos MORI	–	1,009	32%	12%	**34%**	15%	7%	2
18–20 Nov 2009	YouGov	The Daily Telegraph	1,141	**39%**	12%	24%	18%	7%	15
28 Oct – 3 Nov 2009	TNS-BMRB	Herald	983	**39%**	12%	25%	18%	6%	14
20–31 Aug 2009	Ipsos MORI	Holyrood Magazine	1,000	27%	14%	**33%**	18%	9% SGr: 4% BNP: 1% UKIP: 1% SSP: 1% Ind: <0.5% Others: <0.5%	6
26–28 Aug 2009	YouGov	Mail on Sunday	1,183	**30%**	18%	26%	20%	6%	4
24–26 Aug 2009	YouGov	Daily Mail	1,078	**33%**	16%	25%	19%	7%	8
2–4 Jun 2009	YouGov	Sunday Times	1,048	28%	16%	**31%**	17%	8%	3
22–28 Apr 2009	TNS System 3	–	986	**36%**	9%	19%	32%	4%	4
12–13 Mar 2009	YouGov	Sunday Times	1,380	**37%**	11%	27%	20%	5%	10
29–30 Jan 2009	YouGov	Sunday Times	1,498	**37%**	12%	27%	20%	4%	10
22–24 Oct 2008	YouGov	Sunday Times	1,266	**38%**	11%	29%	20%	2%	9
3–5 Sep 2008	YouGov	Sunday Times	1,355	32%	13%	**34%**	17%	4%	2
8–10 Jul 2008	YouGov	The Daily Telegraph	1,131	29%	14%	**33%**	20%	4%	4
26–29 Apr 2008	TNS System 3	–	1,086	**39%**	10%	31%	17%	3%	8
24–28 Apr 2008	YouGov	The Daily Telegraph	1,175	**34%**	14%	30%	17%	5%	4
2–4 Apr 2008	YouGov	The Sun	1,070	**35%**	12%	31%	17%	5%	4
3–8 Jan 2008	YouGov	Daily Express	1,343	**36%**	12%	30%	18%	4%	6
15–17 Aug 2007	YouGov	Sunday Times	1,118	**40%**	11%	31%	14%	4%	9
10–12 Jan 2007	YouGov	Sunday Times	1,005	**35%**	15%	28%	16%	6%	7
4–8 Jan 2007	YouGov	Channel 4	1,061	**34%**	15%	27%	19%	5%	7
17–22 Nov 2006	YouGov	The Daily Telegraph	1,016	**36%**	16%	25%	18%	5%	11
1 Apr – 30 Jun 2006	Ipsos MORI	–	520	**36%**	17%	24%	17%	6%	12
1 Jan – 31 Mar 2006	Ipsos MORI	–	526	**44%**	17%	16%	19%	4%	25
5 May 2005	2005 general election		–	**39.5%**	22.6%	17.7%	15.8%	4.4%	16.9

=== Wales ===
Date(s) conducted	Pollster	Client	Sample size	Lab	Con	LD	PC	Others	Lead
6 May 2010	2010 general election		–	**36.2%**	26.1%	20.1%	11.3%	6.3%	10.1
1–3 May 2010	YouGov	ITV Wales	Unknown	**35%**	27%	23%	10%	5%	8
Late Apr 2010	R&MP	Western Mail	Unknown	**37.5%**	23.5%	21%	10.8%	7.2%	14
16–19 Apr 2010	YouGov	ITV Wales	1,070	**33%**	23%	29%	9%	6%	4
Mar 2010	NAW	ITV Wales	Unknown	**39%**	27%	13%	13%	9%	12
Mar 2010	YouGov	ITV Wales	Unknown	**37%**	29%	12%	14%	7%	8
Jan 2010	YouGov	ITV Wales	Unknown	**35%**	32%	13%	13%	7%	3
Nov 2009	YouGov	ITV Wales	Unknown	**34%**	31%	14%	14%	7%	3
21–23 Oct 2009	YouGov	University of Aberystwyth	1,078	**34%**	31%	12%	15%	7%	3
Jul 2009	YouGov	IWP-WGC	Unknown	28%	**33%**	14%	14%	11%	5
Mar 2009	Beaufort	Plaid Cymru	Unknown	**41%**	22%	13%	17%	7%	19
5 May 2005	2005 general election		–	**42.7%**	21.4%	18.4%	12.6%	4.9%	16.9

=== Marginal constituencies ===
YouGov conducted polls on select series of marginal constituencies for PoliticsHome's Electoral Index.

==== "Inner London" ====
The constituencies polled were Battersea, Bethnal Green and Bow, Hammersmith, Poplar and Limehouse, Tooting and Westminster North.

Dates conducted	Pollster	Client	Sample size	Lab	Con	LD	Others	Lead
6 May 2010	2010 general election		–	**41.5%**	33.6%	15.1%	9.8% Rsp: 5.7% Other: 4.1%	8.0
11–21 Sep 2009	YouGov	PoliticsHome	Unknown	36%	**37%**	18%	9%	1
22 Jul – 4 Aug 2008	YouGov	PoliticsHome	Unknown	34%	**41%**	17%	7%	7
5 May 2005	2005 general election		–	**40%**	29%	16%	15%	11

==== "Outer London" ====
The constituencies polled were Brentford and Isleworth, Croydon Central, Dagenham and Rainham, Ealing Central and Acton, Ealing North, Eltham, Enfield North, Feltham and Heston, Finchley and Golders Green, Harrow East, Harrow West, Hendon and Bromley and Chislehurst.

Dates conducted	Pollster	Client	Sample size	Lab	Con	LD	Others	Lead
6 May 2010	2010 general election		–	36.9%	**41.3%**	14.8%	7.0%	4.4
11–21 Sep 2009	YouGov	PoliticsHome	Unknown	32%	**42%**	16%	10%	10
22 Jul – 4 Aug 2008	YouGov	PoliticsHome	Unknown	30%	**46%**	16%	7%	16
5 May 2005	2005 general election		–	**42%**	36%	17%	5%	6

==== "London Commuter Belt" ====
The constituencies polled were Bedford, Castle Point, Chatham and Aylesford, Crawley, Dartford, Gillingham and Rainham, Gravesham, Harrow, Hemel Hempstead, Kettering, Luton North, Luton South, Milton Keynes North, Milton Keynes South, Northampton North, Northampton South, Reading West, Rochester and Strood, Sittingbourne and Sheppey, Slough, South Basildon and East Thurrock, Stevenage and Thurrock.

Dates conducted	Pollster	Client	Sample size	Lab	Con	LD	Others	Lead
6 May 2010	2010 general election		–	30.7%	**50.3%**	16.8%	2.2%	19.6
11–21 Sep 2009	YouGov	PoliticsHome	Unknown	26%	**46%**	15%	12%	20
22 Jul – 4 Aug 2008	YouGov	PoliticsHome	Unknown	27%	**52%**	14%	8%	25
5 May 2005	2005 general election		–	**42%**	38%	15%	5%	4

==== Seaside towns ====
The constituencies polled were Blackpool North and Cleveleys, Blackpool South, Brighton Kemptown, Brighton Pavilion, Cleethorpes, Dorset South, Great Yarmouth, Hastings and Rye, Hove, Morecambe and Lunesdale and Thanet South.

Dates conducted	Pollster	Client	Sample size	Lab	Con	LD	Others	Lead
6 May 2010	2010 general election		–	34.8%	**42.2%**	16.6%	6.4%	7.4
11–21 Sep 2009	YouGov	PoliticsHome	Unknown	32%	**36%**	14%	19%	4
22 Jul – 4 Aug 2008	YouGov	PoliticsHome	Unknown	30%	**44%**	14%	11%	14
5 May 2005	2005 general election		–	**43%**	34%	15%	8%	9

==== "Labour's southern bastions" ====
The constituencies polled were Bristol East, Bristol North West, Dover, Exeter, Gloucester, Ipswich, Kingswood, Norwich North, Plymouth Moor View, Plymouth Sutton and Devonport, Portsmouth North, North East Somerset, Southampton Itchen, Southampton Test, Stroud, Swindon North, Swindon South and Waveney.

Dates conducted	Pollster	Client	Sample size	Lab	Con	LD	Others	Lead
6 May 2010	2010 general election		–	32.9%	**38.7%**	22.4%	6.0%	5.8
11–21 Sep 2009	YouGov	PoliticsHome	Unknown	29%	**39%**	19%	12%	10
22 Jul – 4 Aug 2008	YouGov	PoliticsHome	Unknown	29%	**44%**	19%	8%	15
5 May 2005	2005 general election		–	**43%**	33%	18%	6%	10

== Individual constituency poll results ==
=== Blaenau Gwent ===
Blaenau Gwent maintained its 2005 boundaries at the 2010 general election.

Dates conducted	Pollster	Client	Sample size	Law (Ind)	Lab	LD	PC	Con	BGPV	Others	Lead
6 May 2010	2010 general election		–	–	**52.4%**	10.1%	4.1%	7.0%	19.9%	6.4%	32.5
29 Jun 2006	2006 by-election		–	–	37.0%	5.4%	6.5%	3.7%	**46.7%**	1.2%	9.7
1 Jun 2006	NOP	–	?	–	**47%**	6%	6%	5%	35%	–	12
5 May 2005	2005 general election		–	**58.2%**	32.3%	4.3%	2.4%	2.4%	–	0.5%	25.9

=== Brighton Pavilion ===
Between the 2005 and 2010 general elections the boundaries of Brighton Pavilion were changed. The Green Party candidate was its leader, Caroline Lucas.

Dates conducted	Pollster	Client	Sample size	Lab	Con	Grn	LD	UKIP	Others	Lead
6 May 2010	2010 general election		–	28.9%	23.7%	**31.3%**	13.8%	1.8%	1.4%	2.4
16–21 Dec 2009	ICM	Green Party of England and Wales	533	25%	27%	**35%**	11%	–	2%	8
5 May 2005	2005 general election		–	**35.4%**	23.9%	21.9%	16.5%	1.2%	1.1%	11.5

=== Crewe and Nantwich ===
Between the 2005 and 2010 general elections the boundaries of Crewe and Nantwich were changed.

Dates conducted	Pollster	Client	Sample size	Lab	Con	LD	Others	Lead
6 May 2010	2010 general election		–	34.0%	**45.8%**	15.0%	5.1%	11.8
22 May 2008	2008 by-election		–	30.6%	**49.5%**	14.6%	5.5%	18.9
15–18 May 2008	ComRes	The Independent	?	35%	**48%**	12%	–	13
May 2008	ICM	News of the World	?	37%	**45%**	14%	–	8
7–8 May 2008	ICM	Mail on Sunday	?	39%	**43%**	16%	–	4
5 May 2005	2005 general election		–	**48.8%**	32.6%	18.6%	–	16.2

=== Glasgow East ===
Glasgow East maintained its 2005 boundaries at the 2010 general election.

Dates conducted	Pollster	Client	Sample size	Lab	SNP	LD	Con	SSP	Others	Lead
6 May 2010	2010 general election		–	**61.6%**	24.7%	5.0%	4.5%	1.4%	2.7%	36.9
24 Jul 2008	2008 by-election		–	41.7%	**43.1%**	3.5%	6.3%	2.1%	3.4%	1.4
14–17 Jul 2008	Progressive Scottish Opinion	–	?	**52%**	35%	7%	3%	–	–	17
10–11 Jul 2008	ICM	Sunday Telegraph	?	**47%**	33%	9%	7%	–	4%	14
5 May 2005	2005 general election		–	**60.7%**	17.0%	11.8%	6.9%	3.5%	–	43.7

=== Glasgow North East ===
Glasgow North East maintained its 2005 boundaries at the 2010 general election.

Dates conducted	Pollster	Client	Sample size	Spk	SNP	SLP	SSP	BNP	Lab	Con	LD	Others	Lead
6 May 2010	2010 general election		–	–	14.1%	0.5%	0.9%	2.7%	**68.3%**	5.3%	7.7%	0.6%	54.2
12 Nov 2009	2009 by-election		–	–	20.0%	0.2%	0.7%	4.9%	**59.4%**	5.2%	2.3%	7.3%	39.4
31 May 2009	Scottish Opinion	Sunday Times	?	–	33%	–	–	–	**51%**	6%	3%	7%	18
5 May 2005	2005 general election		–	**53.3%**	17.7%	14.2%	4.9%	3.2%	–	–	–	6.7%	35.6

=== Glenrothes ===
Glenrothes maintained its 2005 boundaries at the 2010 general election.

Dates conducted	Pollster	Client	Sample size	Lab	SNP	LD	Con	Others	Lead
6 May 2010	2010 general election		–	**62.3%**	21.7%	7.7%	7.2%	1.0%	40.6
6 Nov 2008	2008 by-election		–	**55.1%**	36.5%	2.6%	3.8%	1.9%	18.6
17 Sep 2008	ICM	Mail on Sunday	?	**43%**	**43%**	8%	5%	1%	Tie
5 May 2005	2005 general election		–	**51.9%**	23.4%	12.7%	7.1%	5.0%	28.5

=== Norwich North ===
Between the 2005 and 2010 general elections the boundaries of Norwich North were changed.

Dates conducted	Pollster	Client	Sample size	Lab	Con	LD	Grn	UKIP	Others	Lead
6 May 2010	2010 general election		–	31.4%	**40.6%**	18.3%	2.9%	4.4%	2.4%	9.2
23 Jul 2009	2009 by-election		–	18.2%	**39.5%**	14.0%	9.7%	11.8%	6.8%	21.3
19–21 Jun 2009	ICM	University of East Anglia	?	30%	**34%**	15%	14%	7%		4
5 May 2005	2005 general election		–	**44.9%**	33.2%	16.2%	2.7%	2.4%	0.7%	11.7

== Other polling ==
=== Public sector workers ===
Ipsos MORI conducted a poll for UNISON sampling public sector workers only.

Dates conducted	Pollster	Client	Sample size	Con	Lab	LD	Grn	SNP / PC	UKIP	BNP	Others	Lead
12–14 Jun 2009	Ipsos MORI	UNISON	494	**32%**	29%	19%	8%	4%	3%	2%	3%	3

== Hypothetical scenarios ==
=== Alternative Labour Party leaders ===
ComRes produced a poll for The Independent to gauge how people would vote under a different Labour leader than Gordon Brown.

Dates conducted	Pollster	Client	Sample size	Hypothetical Labour leader	Lab	Con	LD	Others	Lead
5–7 Jun 2009	ComRes	The Independent	1,001	Alan Johnson	26%	36%	19%	19%	10
5–7 Jun 2009	ComRes	The Independent	1,001	Jack Straw	25%	36%	19%	20%	11
5–7 Jun 2009	ComRes	The Independent	1,001	David Miliband	25%	37%	19%	19%	12
5–7 Jun 2009	ComRes	The Independent	1,001	Jon Cruddas	22%	37%	21%	21%	15
5–7 Jun 2009	ComRes	The Independent	1,001	Ed Balls	23%	38%	20%	19%	15
5–7 Jun 2009	ComRes	The Independent	1,001	Harriet Harman	22%	38%	20%	20%	16
5–7 Jun 2009	ComRes	The Independent	1,001	James Purnell	21%	38%	21%	20%	17

=== With Gordon Brown as Labour leader ===
It was widely expected that Tony Blair would step down as leader of the Labour Party and Prime Minister at some point during this parliament and be succeeded by Gordon Brown. Before this eventually happened in June 2007, some polling companies conducted hypothetical polls with the condition of Brown as Labour leader.

Dates conducted	Pollster	Client	Sample size	Lab	Con	LD	Others	Lead
24–27 Jun 2007	Gordon Brown is elected leader of the Labour Party and subsequently becomes Prime Minister							
7–9 Jul 2006	Populus	The Times	1,512	35%	**40%**	15%	9%	5
16–17 Mar 2006	YouGov	The Sunday Times	1,811	37%	**39%**	17%	8%	2

== See also ==
- Opinion polling for the 2015 United Kingdom general election
- Opinion polling for the 2005 United Kingdom general election
- 2009 European Parliament election in the United Kingdom
- List of political parties in the United Kingdom
