= Gemma Garrett =

British model (born 1981)

- Born: 25 September 1981 (age 45); Belfast, Northern Ireland, United Kingdom
- Height: 5 ft 6 in (1.68 m)

Gemma Dawn Garrett (born 25 September 1981, Belfast, Northern Ireland) is a former holder of the titles Miss Great Britain and Miss Ulster. She was also the official face of the Formula One 2008 British Grand Prix at Silverstone.

== Life and career ==
Gemma Garrett was born on 25 September 1981 in Belfast, Northern Ireland. Her mother and father worked as a classroom assistant and a security manager respectively. She has an older sister and a younger brother, Stephen, a footballer who has played for local clubs including Newry City and Cliftonville. Garrett spent her early years in the Ballybeen estate in Dundonald, around 10 kilometres (6.2 mi) from Belfast, before moving into the East Belfast area of the city at the age of seven. She achieved ten GCSEs, but left school at the age of sixteen after experiencing bullying. In a 2018 interview she told the Belfast Telegraph that she had been bullied, sometimes physically, because she was "obsessed by beauty queens and models".

After leaving school Garrett began modelling, signing with the Style Academy agency in Belfast. She took part in the Miss Ulster contest in 2000, going on to win the event. She returned briefly to education, studying a college course in applied science and sports massage with the intention of eventually studying physiotherapy, but at age 20 she decided to devote her career to modelling. She spent the subsequent years in London, with modelling assignments including lingerie shoots.

After a brief spell back in Belfast working for Budweiser, Garrett in 2007 entered the Miss Great Britain pageant. She came second in the contest itself, behind winner Rachael Tennant, but in February 2008 inherited the title herself after Tennant resigned her title.

She appeared with Dolph Lundgren in the film Direct Contact, which was scheduled for release in 2008. She was cast as a character called Creech due to her "distinctive" looks. She stood as a candidate in the Crewe and Nantwich by-election on 22 May 2008, representing the "Beauties for Britain" party, formed recently by herself, in the intention, in her own words, of "making Westminster less dowdy and down-trodden". She came in tenth with 113 votes, 0.27% of the total.

She contested the 2008 Haltemprice and Howden by-election following the resignation of its MP, David Davis, representing the Miss Great Britain Party. Her candidacy attracted 521 votes, placing her in fifth position behind the Conservative Party, Green Party, English Democrats and National Front Britain for the British.

Honorary titles
Preceded by Rachael Tennent	Miss Great Britain; 2007	Succeeded by Sophie Gradon
