= 2008 Crewe and Nantwich by-election =

UK parliamentary by-election

- 22 May 2008

Crewe and Nantwich parliamentary seat
- Turnout: 58.2%
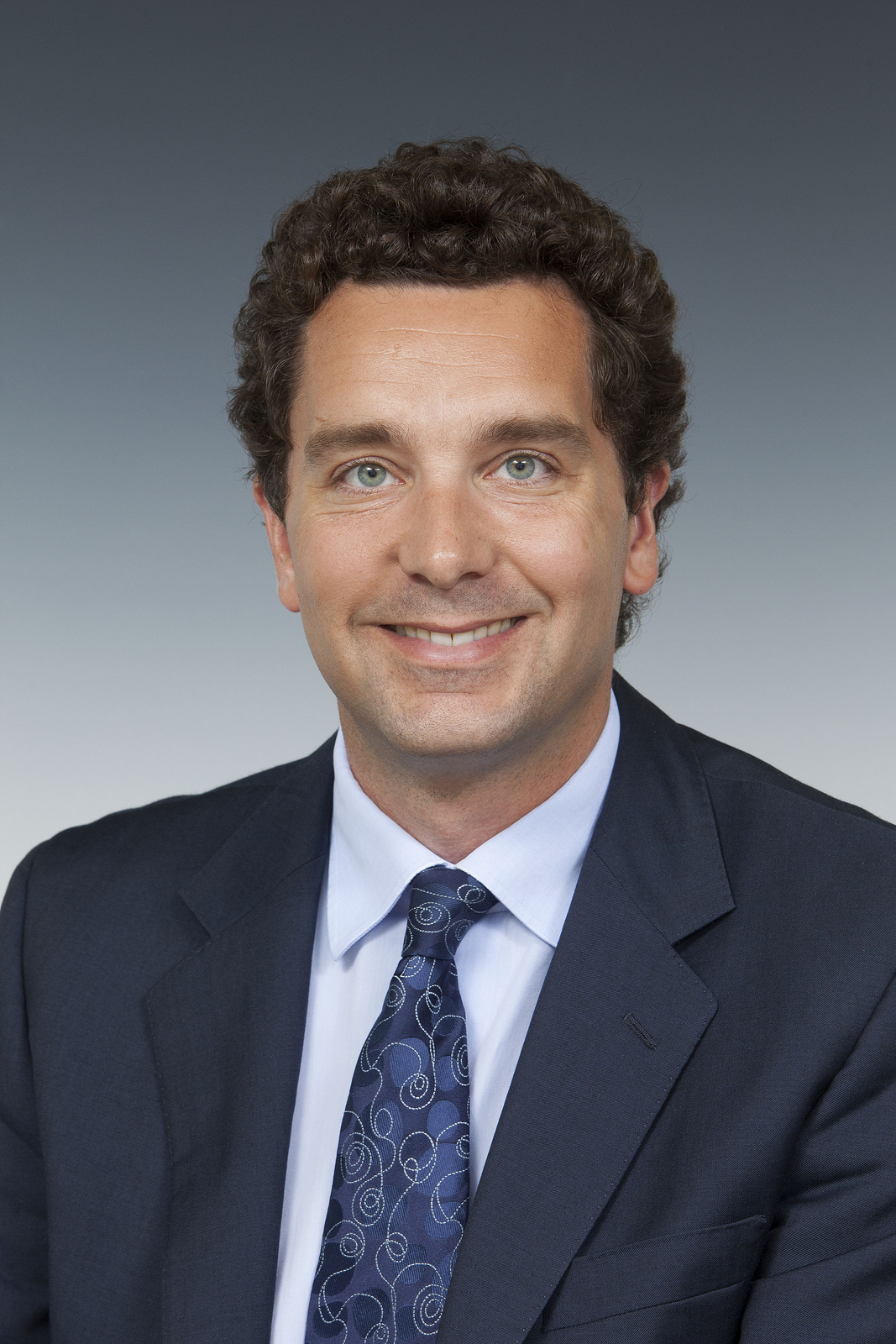

	First party	Second party	Third party
			LD
Candidate	Edward Timpson	Tamsin Dunwoody	Elizabeth Shenton
Party	Conservative	Labour	Liberal Democrats
Popular vote	20,539	12,679	6,040
Percentage	49.5%	30.6%	14.6%
Swing	▲16.9%	▼18.2%	▼4.0%
- Location of Crewe and Nantwich within Cheshire
MP before election
Gwyneth Dunwoody
Labour
Subsequent MP
Edward Timpson
Conservative

A by-election for the United Kingdom parliamentary constituency of Crewe and Nantwich was held on 22 May 2008, triggered by the death of incumbent Labour Party MP Gwyneth Dunwoody. It was won by the Conservative Party candidate Edward Timpson, who defeated the Labour candidate Tamsin Dunwoody—Gwyneth's daughter—on a large swing of Conservative of 17.6%.

This was the first seat gained by the Conservatives in a by-election since the 1982 Mitcham and Morden by-election and the first seat they had taken from Labour in a by-election since the 1978 Ilford North by-election thirty years earlier.

== Overview ==
The by-election was called following the death of the sitting MP Gwyneth Dunwoody on 17 April 2008. The timing of the election caused controversy as, by convention, by-elections are not moved until after the funeral of the deceased Member of Parliament, which drew protests from Conservative and Liberal Democrat members in the House of Commons. However the writ was moved with the approval of the Dunwoody family.

The election had attracted high media and public interest following heavy defeats for the incumbent Labour party in the local elections held earlier that same month, and the fact it followed the controversial removal by the Labour government of the 10 pence national income tax band, which had seen a backbench rebellion against Prime Minister Gordon Brown, causing an announcement in the same month of a recovery package to help the people left worse off by the move.

Immediately following the announcement of the result following the speeches, the defeated Tamsin Dunwoody speaking live to the BBC blamed the swing on a higher turn-out than usual due to the high interest in the election, despite both the turnout and winning vote being lower than the 2005 general election result for this seat. Telling the BBC the Labour vote "held up" in a "democratic decision", defeated candidate Dunwoody called herself a "fighter". New MP Edward Timpson said in his victory speech that he would "not let you down", whilst Prime Minister Brown attributed the defeat to rising petrol prices, and the recent increases in the cost of living.

== Result ==
2008 Crewe and Nantwich by-election
Party	Candidate	Votes	%	±%
Conservative	Edward Timpson	20,539	49.5	▲16.9
Labour	Tamsin Dunwoody	12,679	30.6	▼18.2
Liberal Democrats	Elizabeth Shenton	6,040	14.6	▼4.0
UKIP	Mike Nattrass	922	2.2	New
Green	Robert Smith	359	0.9	New
English Democrat	David Roberts	275	0.7	New
Monster Raving Loony	The Flying Brick	236	0.6	New
No label	Mark Walklate	217	0.5	New
Cut Tax on Diesel and Petrol	Paul Thorogood	118	0.3	New
No label	Gemma Garrett	113	0.3	New
Majority		7,860	18.9	N/A
Turnout		41,856	58.2	▼1.8
Rejected ballots		67	0.2	
Conservative gain from Labour		Swing	▲17.6	

=== Opinion polling ===
An ICM poll from mid-May gave the Conservative candidate 43% to Labour's 39% and the Lib Dems' 16%; a second ICM poll from a week after gave the Conservatives 45% to Labour's 37%.

== Candidates ==
On 3 May 2008, incumbent Gwyneth Dunwoody's daughter Tamsin, a former member of the National Assembly for Wales, was selected as the Labour candidate. Prior to Dunwoody's death, the Conservatives and Liberal Democrats had already selected candidates to contest the seat at the general election. The Conservative Party candidate Edward Timpson was a barrister practising in Chester. Since 2006, he had been the Conservative Party's campaigns co-ordinator for the Eddisbury constituency. The Liberal Democrat candidate Elizabeth Shenton had worked as a senior manager for the RBS and NatWest, where she was an active member of the trade union. At the time of the election she was also a councillor in Newcastle-under-Lyme.

The UK Independence Party candidate was Mike Nattrass, MEP for the nearby West Midlands and a former deputy party leader. Robert Smith, a 23-year-old town planner (and transport planning specialist) educated at the University of Liverpool stood for the Green Party of England and Wales and particularly campaigned to reverse the privatisation of British Rail (and associated fare increases).

The Official Monster Raving Loony Party stood "The Flying Brick" (his legal name, although he was formerly known as Nick Delves), the party's treasurer and Shadow Minister for the Abolition of Gravity. Independent candidate Mark Walklate was a locally educated salesperson (with a business degree) who stood for the Conservatives in the 2006 and 2007 council elections. Paul Thorogood's party, Cut Tax on Petrol and Diesel, was registered with the Electoral Commission on 23 March 2008, with Thorogood as its Leader, Nominating Officer and Treasurer, although his party is listed on the nomination paper as "Cut Tax on Diesel and Petrol" (the fourth and sixth words reversed). The newly formed Beauties for Britain Party fielded Gemma Garrett, the then-Miss Great Britain, as a candidate in what was their first election campaign, announcing that they wanted to "help make Westminster as glamorous a place as its fellow European legislatures, where beautiful women abound in the higher echelons of government". The party was not, however, registered with the Electoral Commission, so she had to stand as an independent. Garrett and fellow independent Mark Walklate are recorded as having no party name or description at all on the official record of candidates as opposed to having the word, 'Independent' by their names on the ballot paper.

== Campaign ==
The Labour Party ran a personal class-based campaign against the Conservative candidate, calling him "the Tarporley Toff", "Lord Snooty", "Tory Boy Timpson". Labour supporters donned top hats to mock Timpson, whose family own Timpson, a national shoe repair and key-cutting business. This has been viewed by some social commentators as a form of reverse snobbery. Dunwoody, who arrived for the campaign from her 6-acre (24,000 m^{2}) holding in Wales, was termed "One of us", as she was daughter of the deceased Labour MP. The campaign was criticised by a number of national newspapers, including the left-leaning Guardian as well as The Times, while Dunwoody herself was confronted by Jeremy Paxman on Newsnight over the fact that she has an entry in Burke's Peerage and Baronetage.

On the last day of the campaign, the accidental communication by a Conservative party worker of voting intention data of 8,000 people to a radio station sparked an investigation by the Information Commissioner into possible breaches of data protection laws.

== History ==
The constituency had been held by Gwyneth Dunwoody for Labour since its creation in 1983. Just three parties contested the seat at the 2005 UK general election. Dunwoody held the seat with a reduced majority, while both the Conservative Party and Liberal Democrats enjoyed an increase in their vote share.

General election 2005: Crewe and Nantwich
Party	Candidate	Votes	%	±%
Labour	Gwyneth Dunwoody	21,240	48.8	▼5.5
Conservative	Eveleigh Moore-Dutton	14,162	32.6	▲2.2
Liberal Democrats	Paul Roberts	8,083	18.6	▲5.1
Majority		7,078	16.3	▼7.7
Turnout		43,485	60.0	▼0.2
Labour hold		Swing	▼3.8	
