= Miss Great Britain =

National beauty contest in Britain

- Formation: 1945
- Type: Beauty pageant
- Headquarters: London
- Location: United Kingdom
- Official language: English

Miss Great Britain is a national beauty pageant in the Great Britain with origins dating back to the post–World War II era. First held in 1945, the competition has evolved over the decades and remains one of the country's longest-running beauty contests. The pageant is currently owned by John Singh and continues to feature sub-brands such as Ms Great Britain and Ms Great Britain Classic.

== History ==
In the years following World War II, a number of British seaside resorts began hosting bathing beauty contests. The first event that evolved into Miss Great Britain took place in Morecambe in 1945, organised by the local council in partnership with the Sunday Dispatch newspaper.

Miss Great Britain was based in Morecambe from 1956 to 1989. The first final attracted over 4,000 spectators despite heavy rain. The prize fund increased steadily during the 1950s, reflecting the contest’s growing popularity, and at the time it offered one of the largest prize totals run by a local authority. Heats were later held across Mecca dance halls, and between 1951 and 1957, winners also qualified to compete in Miss World.

During the 1970s, the contest gained national exposure through televised broadcasts. A production by Yorkshire Television for ITV in 1971 drew an audience of several million viewers. The BBC later acquired rights to the event, but in 1984 announced its final broadcast, citing changing public attitudes toward beauty pageants. Following the 1989 final, Miss Great Britain went on hiatus.

== Present Day ==
Today Miss Great Britain continues to operate as a national competition with regional heats across Great Britain. The pageant focuses on personal development, public engagement, and charity work alongside traditional beauty contest elements.

== Notable Miss Great Britain Contestants ==
Notable contestants in the Miss Great Britain contest have included:

- Anne Heywood, a film actor during the 1950s–80s, won the title in 1950 under her real name of Violet Pretty.
- Leila Williams, a presenter of the children's television programme Blue Peter between 1958 and 1962, won the title in 1957.
- Marti Caine, a comedian, competed in 1961 under her real name of Lynne Shepherd.
- Nina Carter, a future Page 3 girl, appeared in the 1971 final under her real name of Penny Mallett.
- Debbie Greenwood, who later became a breakfast television presenter, won the title in 1984.
- Danielle Lloyd, a model and TV personality, won the title in 2006. Controversy led to Preeti Desai replacing Lloyd in 2006. However, Lloyd was reinstated in 2010 by the owner of the Miss Great Britain pageant between 2009 to 2011.
- Sophie Gradon, a model and TV personality, won the title in 2009.
- Zara Holland won the title in 2015 and was stripped of it in 2016 after having sex on the TV dating show Love Island.
- Leilani Dowding, an activist, TV personality, and former Page 3 girl and glamour model, became the first woman of Asian descent to win when she took the title in 1998.

== 2006 event ==
In November 2006, the original winner, Danielle Lloyd, was stripped of her title due to allegations of her involvement with one of the judges and her agreement to pose for Playboy magazine. A poll of readers of The Sun newspaper selected Preeti Desai as Lloyd’s replacement. This made Desai the first woman of Indian heritage to hold the Miss Great Britain title, albeit for only six months. However, in 2010, the pageant organizer Liz Fuller reversed this decision, reinstating Danielle Lloyd as the rightful winner and thereby annulling Desai's title.

== 2007 event ==
Rachael Tennent, a project co-ordinator, was awarded the crown of Miss Great Britain. Along with the crown, the new titleholder was gifted a car, jewellery and a modelling contract. Tennent had previously competed for the Miss Scotland 2006 title which she placed 2nd runner-up. The event was held in Grosvenor House in Park Lane, London. Tennent did not complete her reign which resulted in Gemma Garrett (Miss Great Britain 1st Runner Up 2007) taking over the title of Miss Great Britain for the rest of the year.

== 2009 event ==
The event took place on 12 May 2009 at the Café de Paris in Central London. A strong PR campaign was orchestrated to re-brand the event to the nation, with some 70,000 online entrants being whittled down through national heats to the final 12 girls. Heavily covered by the media, the eventual winner was Miss Newcastle - Sophie Gradon who won Miss Great Britain at the age of 23 years old.

== Title holders ==
Year	Miss Great Britain	Ms Great Britain	Ms Great Britain Classic
1945	Lydia Reid		
1946	June Rivers		
1947	June Mitchell		
1948	Pamela Bayliss		
1949	Elaine Pryce		
1950	Violet Pretty		
1951	Marlene Dee		
1952	Dorothy Dawn		
1953	Brenda Mee		
1954	Patricia Butler		
1955	Jennifer Chimes		
1956	Iris Waller		
1957	Leila Williams		
1958	Christine Mayo		
1959	Valerie Martin		
1960	Eileen Sheridan†		
1961	Libby Walker		
1962	Joy Black		
1963	Gillian Taylor		
1964	Carole Redhead		
1965	Diane Hickinbotham		
1966	Carole Fletcher		
1967	Sheila Forrest		
1968	Yvonne Ormes		
1969	Wendy Anne George		
1970	Kathleen Winstanley		
1971	Carolyn Moore		
1972	Elizabeth Robinson		
1973	Gay Spink		
1974	Marilyn Ward		
1975	Susan Cuff		
1976	Dinah May		
1977	Susan Hempel		
1978	Patricia Morgan		
1979	No contest		
1980	Sue Berger		
1981	Michelle Hobson		
1982	Tracy Dodds (resigned); Viviennne Farnen (replacement)		
1983	Rose McGrory		
1984	Debbie Greenwood		
1985	Jill Saxby		
1986	Lesley Ann Musgrave		
1987	Linzi Butler		
1988	Gillian Bell		
1989	Amanda Dyson		
1990	No contest		
1991	Zoe Charlesworth		
1992	No contest		
1993	Kathryn Middleton		
1994	Michaela Pyke		
1995	Sarah Jane Southwick		
1996	Anita St. Rose		
1997	Liz Fuller		
1998	Leilani Dowding		
1999	Cherie Pisani		
2000	Michelle Walker		
2001	Michelle Evans		
2002	Yana Booth		
2003	Nicki Lane		
2004	Emma Spellar		
2005	No contest		
2006	Danielle Lloyd (stripped); Preeti Desai (replacement)		
2007	Rachael Tennent (resigned); Gemma Garrett (replacement)		
2008	No contest		
2009	Sophie Gradon		
2010	Amy Carrier		
2011	No contest		
2012	Charlotte Perkins		
2013	Ashley Powell		
2014	Shelby Tribble		
2015	Zara Holland (stripped); Deone Robertson (replacement)		
2016	Ursula Carlton		
2017	Saffron Hart		
2018	Kobi-Jean Cole		
2019	No contest		
2020	Jen Atkin	April Banbury	
2021	Eden McAllister	Kat Henry	Kirsty Fletcher
2022	Amy Meisak	Charlotte Casie Clemie	Nicoll Moss
2023	Madeleine Wahdan	Larissa Palmer-Hirst	Gina Broadhurst
2024	Ava Morgan	Emma Powell	Debbie Hughes
2025	Alice Cutler	Kirstie Haysman	Laura White
2026			

== Archives ==
Archives of Miss Great Britain are held at The Women's Library at the Library of the London School of Economics. Most surviving material is held at Lancashire Archives as part of the Morecambe and Heysham Borough Council collection.
