= Sophie Gradon =

English model (1985–2018)

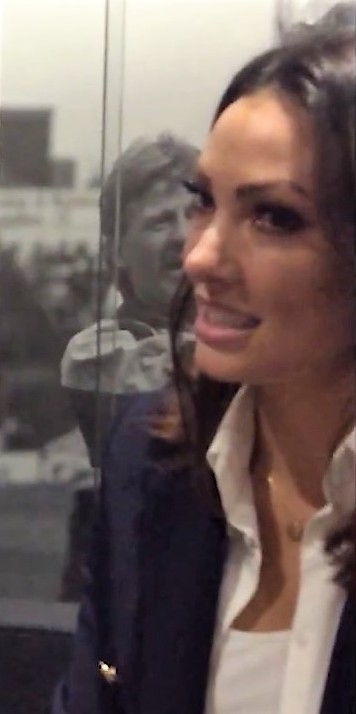
- Gradon in 2018
- Born: Sophie Hannah Gradon; 25 October 1985; Newcastle upon Tyne, England
- Died: 20 June 2018 (aged 32); Ponteland, Northumberland, England
- Occupation: Model
- Years active: 2008–2018
- Television: Love Island (2016)

Sophie Hannah Gradon (25 October 1985 – 20 June 2018) was an English model. In 2008, she won Miss Newcastle. In 2009, Gradon won the title Miss Great Britain. In 2016, she was a contestant on the second series of ITV2's Love Island.

== Early life and education ==
Gradon was born in Newcastle. She was educated at Dame Allan's School and she went on to complete her GCE Advanced Levels at Ponteland High School. She obtained a 2:1 degree in media, culture and society from Northumbria University.

== Career ==
In 2008, Gradon won the Miss Newcastle title. In 2009, she won the Miss Great Britain title. Gradon worked as a marketing manager. She was a promoter of the NE1 campaign in Newcastle City Centre, through which she raised money for charities. In this capacity, Gradon successfully solicited financial support from Calum Best for the Great North Run in 2011. Thousands of pounds were raised to send children with cancer on a trip to Crete. Chronicle Live reported that Calum agreed to support this charity after he saw the work Gradon did for the Sara's Hope Foundation. In 2011, Gradon appeared on Sky Sports in support of the campaign "The Great North Fitness Revolution".

She was a contestant on Love Island in 2016. During her time on the reality TV series, Love Island, Gradon began a relationship with barman Tom Powell before coupling up with glamour model Katie Salmon, Love Island's first same-sex pairing. She decided to leave the villa on day 39.

In 2018, Gradon was part of a talk on social media and its impact on children. In a March 2018 interview with Radio Aire, Gradon revealed that she was the victim of intense cyberbullying and internet trolls.

She reported in the interview:

"It was horrific. I think when you get so many comments on the scale we did coming out of thousands of followers."

She added:

"There are fans and positive comments but people would focus on the negatives. Sometimes I would look for it...There would be so many negative comments. They are commenting on the way you look, the way you talk. They would come up with an opinion of you on a TV show where they've watched you for 45 minutes."

== Personal life ==
In 2008, Gradon dated Wayne Lineker, brother of Gary Lineker. In 2013, Gradon dated rugby player Danny Cipriani. In 2016, reports stated that Gradon was "openly bisexual". She was widely known among the social scene in Newcastle.

== Death ==
On 20 June 2018, at the age of 32, Gradon was found dead by her boyfriend and his brother at her parents' house in Medburn. A spokesperson for the Northumbria Police reported that there did not appear to be suspicious circumstances and a cause of death was not initially revealed. Officials later stated the cause of death was likely suicide. Her death sparked a response among media outlets, with the organisation of Miss Great Britain and several members of the cast of Love Island expressing condolences. Her funeral was held on 5 July 2018.

According to an inquest in April 2019, Gradon died by suicide after taking cocaine and alcohol. About 20 days after her death, Gradon's boyfriend Aaron Armstrong also died by suicide as inquest revealed 'he couldn't cope without her'.

Honorary titles
Preceded by Amy Carrier	Miss Great Britain; 2009	Succeeded by Rachael Tennent
