= Sudanese Greeks =

Ethnic group in Sudan

Έλληνες του Σουδάν
- (Greece) (Sudan)
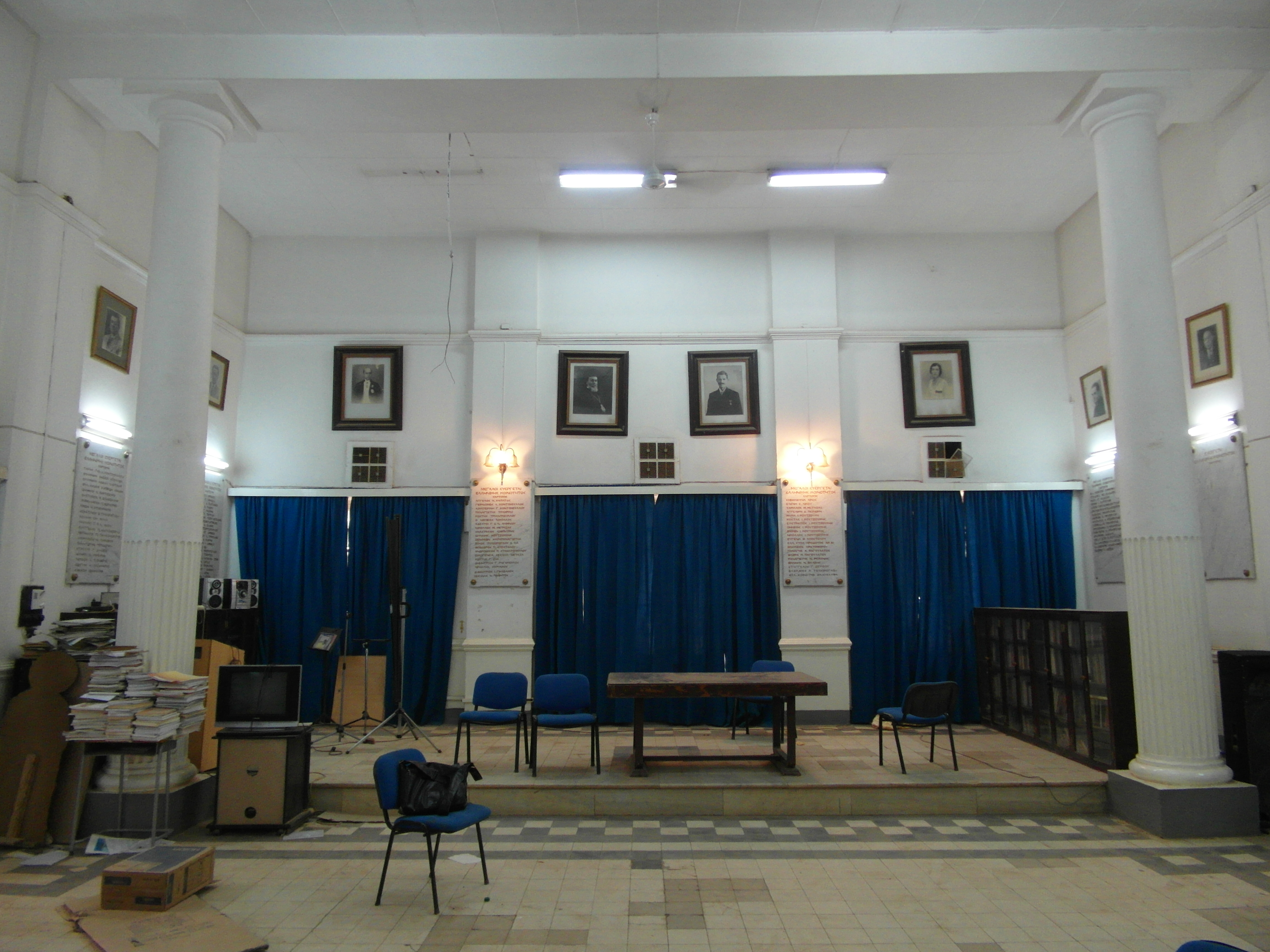
- The ceremony hall of the Hellenic Community in Khartoum (2015)

Total population
- 150 + unknown number of descendants.

Regions with significant populations
- Khartoum, Port Sudan, El Obeid

Languages
- Greek · Sudanese Arabic · English

Religion
- Predominantly Greek Orthodox Church

Related ethnic groups
- African Greeks · Egyptian Greeks · Ethiopian Greeks

The Sudanese Greeks, or Greeks in Sudan, are ethnic Greeks from modern-day Sudan; they are small in number (estimated at around 150 in 2015), but still a very prominent community in the country. Historically, this diverse group has played a significant role in the political, economic, cultural, and sporting life of Sudan, as they have been one of the few European immigrant communities of considerable size and economic power.

Following cultural exchanges in ancient and medieval times, a few hundred Greeks – mostly military officers and traders – settled in the six decades after the 1820 Egyptian-Turkish conquest of what became modern Sudan. About one hundred of them stayed, either forcedly or deliberately, when the Ottoman occupiers were defeated by the local Mahdist forces in 1885. With the establishment of the Anglo-Egyptian Sudan in 1898, Greek merchants, administrators and artisans de facto became the stalwarts of the British-dominated colonial regime. By the time Sudan gained independence in 1956, their numbers had increased to around 6,000-7,000, but soon afterwards decreased, especially after the nationalisation of many businesses in 1969 and the introduction of Sharia law in 1983.

The Greek anthropologist Gerasimos Makris, who is related to the Greeks of Sudan through marriage, stresses that "neutrality and a 'clean hands' ideology has always been central to the Greek settlers' self-image, though it is difficult to be reconciled with political developments". While the members of this community have been "proud for being Greeks 'more than the Greeks of Greece'", he concedes at the same time a hybrid identity, because they, "in the long run, have proven to be culturally and sentimentally surprisingly close to the Sudanese".

== History ==
=== Ancient times ===
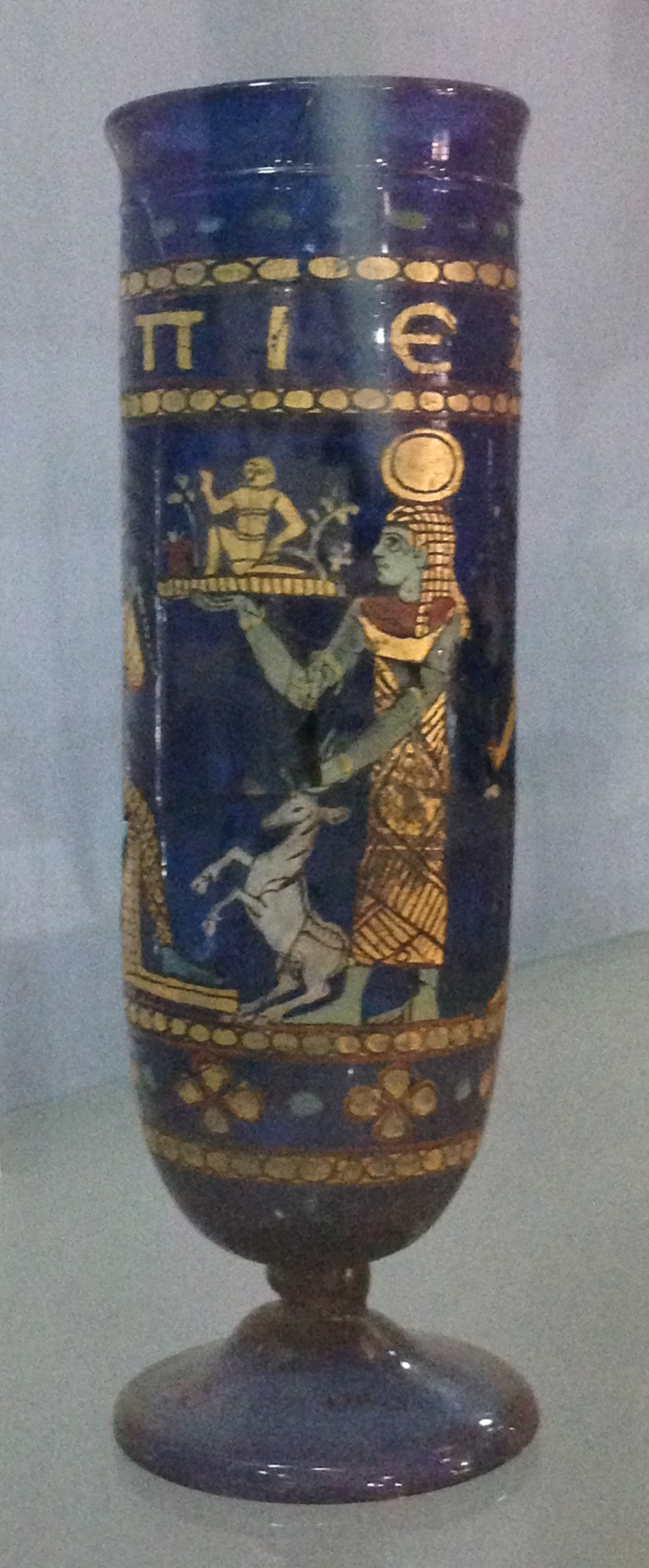
Polychromatic, gilded glass vase of Meroitic manufacture excavated in Sedeinga, on display at the National Museum of Sudan. The Greek letters read "Drink and you shall live"

Intercultural exchange between the Hellenic and Nubian civilizations started at least two and a half millennia ago. The Greek presence in the Nile Valley and its considerable impact on ancient Nubia have long been recognized by scholars. The first recorded contact took place in 593 BC: graffiti at Abu Simbel reveal that large numbers of Greek mercenaries served under Psamtik II in his invasion of what is now Sudan.

Vice versa, ancient Nubia also had an influence on Greek culture from those early times onwards, as it was well known by scholars throughout the Hellenic world, where several of the classical writers mentioned it. It evidently inspired curiosity about the exotic lands South of Egypt and particularly about the sources of the Nile river. Hence, the pioneering historian Herodotus (circa 484 – circa 425 BC) made references to Nubia as a land of "burned faces" (Aethiopians) and the source of the Nile. Though he is assumed to have been personally familiar with the river only as far as Aswan, he did identify a "city of Ethiopians" at Meroë, apparently from reports by Psamtik II and Cambyses II.

A new era of Greek-Nubian relations began in 332 BC, when Alexander the Great conquered Egypt and soon dispatched reconnaissance expeditions into Nubia, possibly to find the sources of the Nile. Scholars assume that the potential Ptolemaic threat contributed to the decision by the Kushitic king Nastasen to move the capital from Napata to Meroë. Greek language and culture were introduced to the Kushitic ruling classes, which may have triggered the creation of an alphabetic Meroitic writing. Hellenic influences are also evident from changes in art styles.

Nubian contact with the Greek world remained sporadic until Ptolemy II's Nubian campaign for Meroë in the 270s BC. Ptolemy's interest in Nubia was to secure a source of war elephants from Meroë, and to gain access to Meroitic gold mines. At the same time, Ergamenes (Arkamani II), King of Kush at the time, studied Greek language and customs at the Alexandrian court in the Ptolemaic Empire.

Eratosthenes (circa 276–194 BC), the Greek geographer and librarian at Alexandria, sketched "with fair accuracy" the course of the Nile as far south as what is now Khartoum, based on the accounts of various travellers. Pliny listed a number of Greeks who had travelled to Meroë and sometimes beyond: Dalion, Aristocreon, Bion, Basilis, and Simonides the Younger, who apparently lived at Meroe for five years.

Relations between Kush and Ptolemaic Egypt thereafter remained tense, but stable. By the time of Ptolemy VIII (170-163 BC), Greek ships regularly sailed on the Red Sea and to Meroitic ports. The Nubian upper class traded with Greek merchants and adopted certain Hellenic styles of life. However, following the death of Cleopatra VII in 30 BC and an unsuccessful attempt by the Romans to conquer the kingdom, Greek influences withered in Nubia. The account of Strabo, the geographer and historian of Greek descent, in his Geographia is one of the last references to Nubia from that time.

==== Axumite conquest of Meroe ====
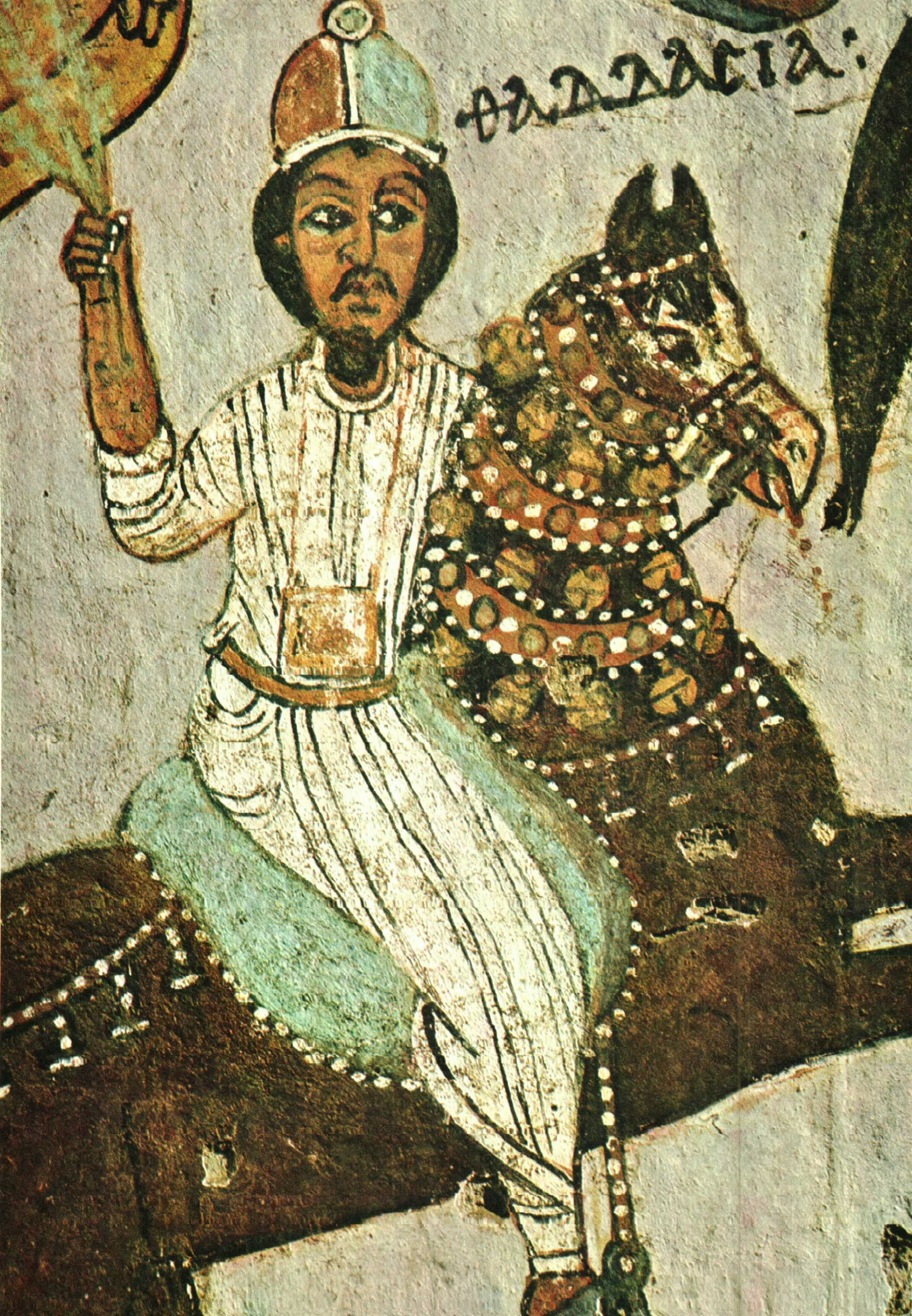
A Nubian Greek fresco in Faras

The Axumite Empire engaged in a series of invasions that culminated in the capture of the Nubian capital of Meroë in the middle of the 4th century AD, signaling the end of independent Nubian Pagan kingdom of kush. It was the Byzantine missionaries that helped established the authority of Christianity In the area, and as a result converted the new Nubian Christian kingdoms, Nobatia, Alodia, and Makuria.

Tribal nomads like the Beja, Afar, and Saho managed to remain autonomous due to their uncentralized nomadic nature. These tribal peoples would sporadically inflict attacks and raids on Axumite communities. The Beja nomads eventually Hellenized and integrated into the Nubian Greek society that had already been present in Lower Nubia.

==== Nubian Greeks ====
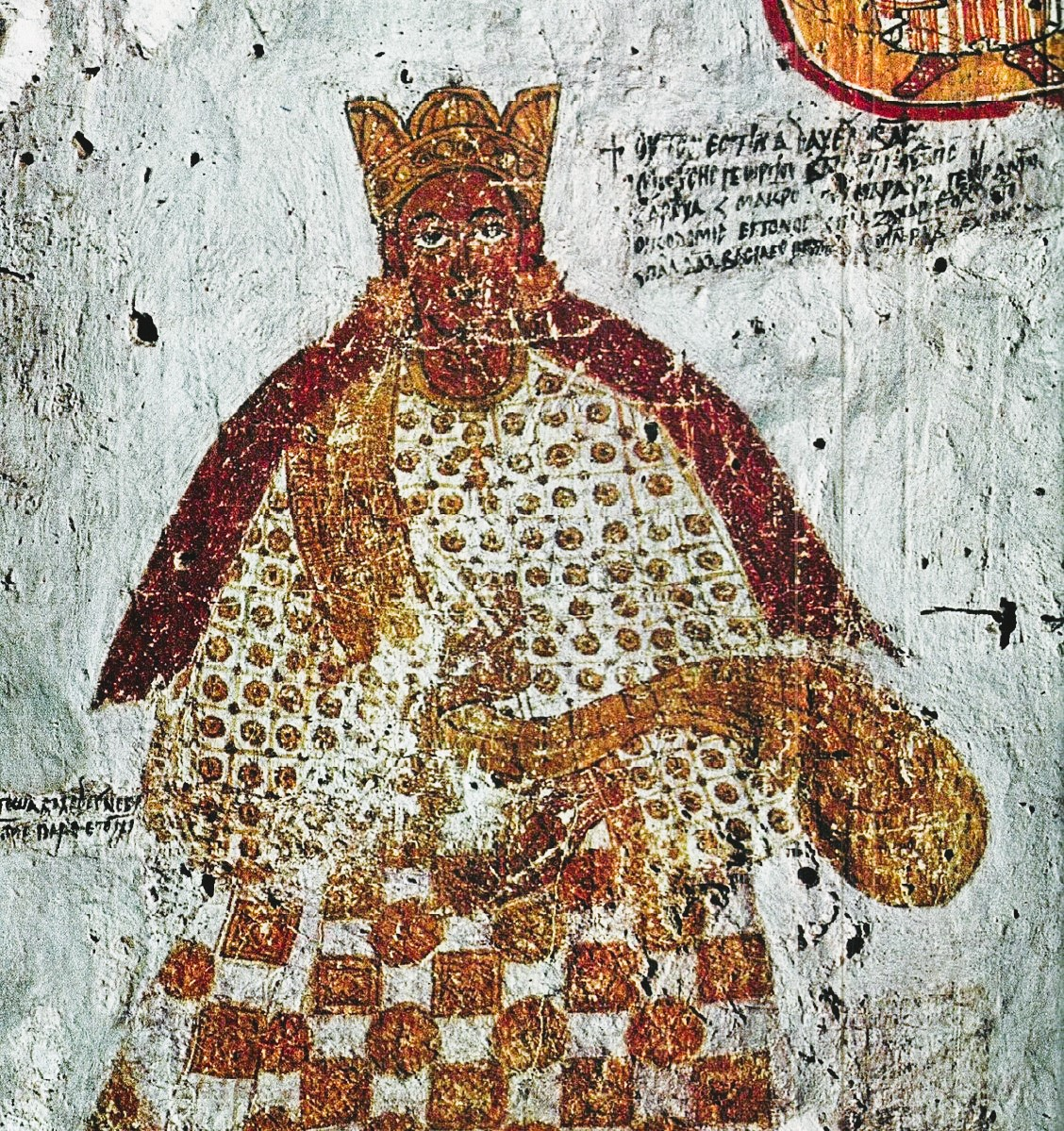
King Moses Georgios of Makuria

Nubian Greek culture followed the pattern of Egyptian Greek and Byzantine Greek civilization, expressed in Nubian Greek art and Nubian Greek literature. The earliest attestations of Nubian Greek literature come from the 5th century; the Nubian Greek language resembles Egyptian and Byzantine Greek; it served as a lingua franca throughout the Nubian Kingdoms, and had a creolized form for trade among the different peoples in Nubia.

Nubian Greek was unique in that it adopted many words from both Coptic Egyptian and Nubian; Nubian Greek's syntax also evolved to establish a fixed word order.

The following is an example of Nubian Greek language:

ⲟⲩⲧⲟⲥ ⲉⲥⲧⲓⲛ ⲁⲇⲁⲩⲉⲗ ⲃⲁⲥⲓⲗⲉⲩ ⲙⲱⲥⲉⲥ ⲅⲉⲱⲣⲅⲓⲟⲩ, ⲃⲁⲥⲓⲗⲉⲩ ⲛⲟⲩⲃⲇⲏⲥ, ⲁⲣⲟⲩⲁ, ⲙⲁⲕⲣⲟ

Οὗτός ἐστιν ἀδαύελ Βασιλεύ Μώσες Γεωργίου, Βασιλεύ Νουβδῆς, Ἀρουά, Μακρό

This is the great King Moses Georgios, the King of Nobatia, Alodia, Makuria

A plethora of frescoes created between 800–1200 AD in Nubian cities such as Faras depicted religious life in the courts of the Nubian Kingdoms; they were made in Byzantine art style.

Nubian Greek titles and government styles in Nubian Kingdoms were based on Byzantine models; even with Islamic encroachments and influence into Nubian territory, the Nubian Greeks saw Constantinople as their spiritual home. Nubian Greek culture disappeared after the Muslim conquest of Nubia around 1450 AD.

=== Medieval times ===
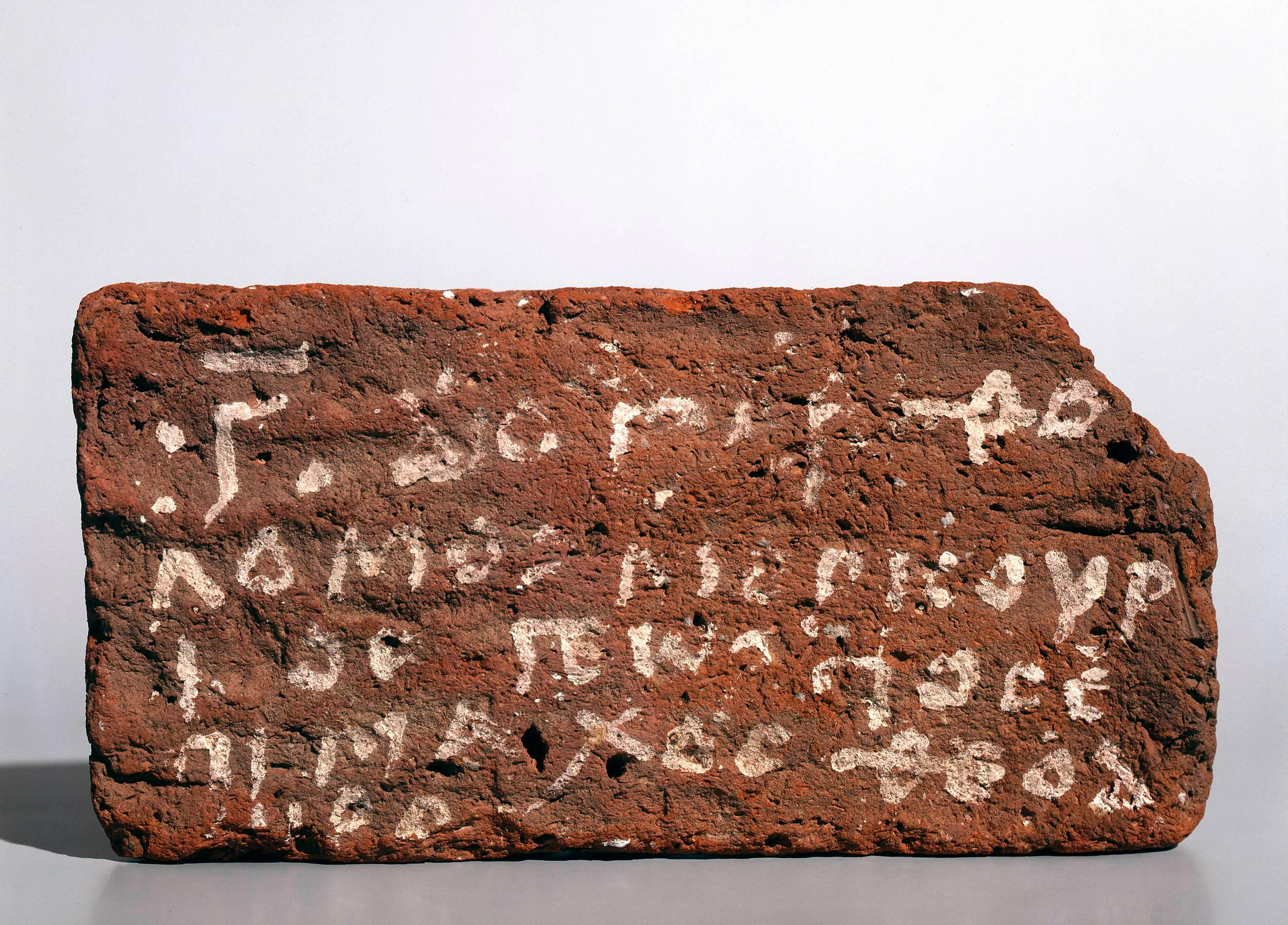
Brick with Greek letter from Faras, between the 9th and 12th century, exhibited in the Faras Gallery at the National Museum in Warsaw

Half a millennium later, Hellenic influence became all the stronger, when Byzantium reached out to Nubia, which consisted of the three kingdoms of Nobadia, Makuria and Alodia . Around 540 AD, the Empress Theodora sent Greek-speaking missionaries to these lands, which had already been in the process of evangelisation earlier and went on to adopt Christianity as their official religion. The two northern states of Nobatia and Makuria later merged, with the former ruled by an Eparch of the latter. Its king was based at Old Dongola and its culture showed especially strong elements of Byzantine Greek influence. These cultural changes are not believed to have been forced upon the indigenous population, but rather adopted as a conscious cultural choice to use elements from the cultures in the North.

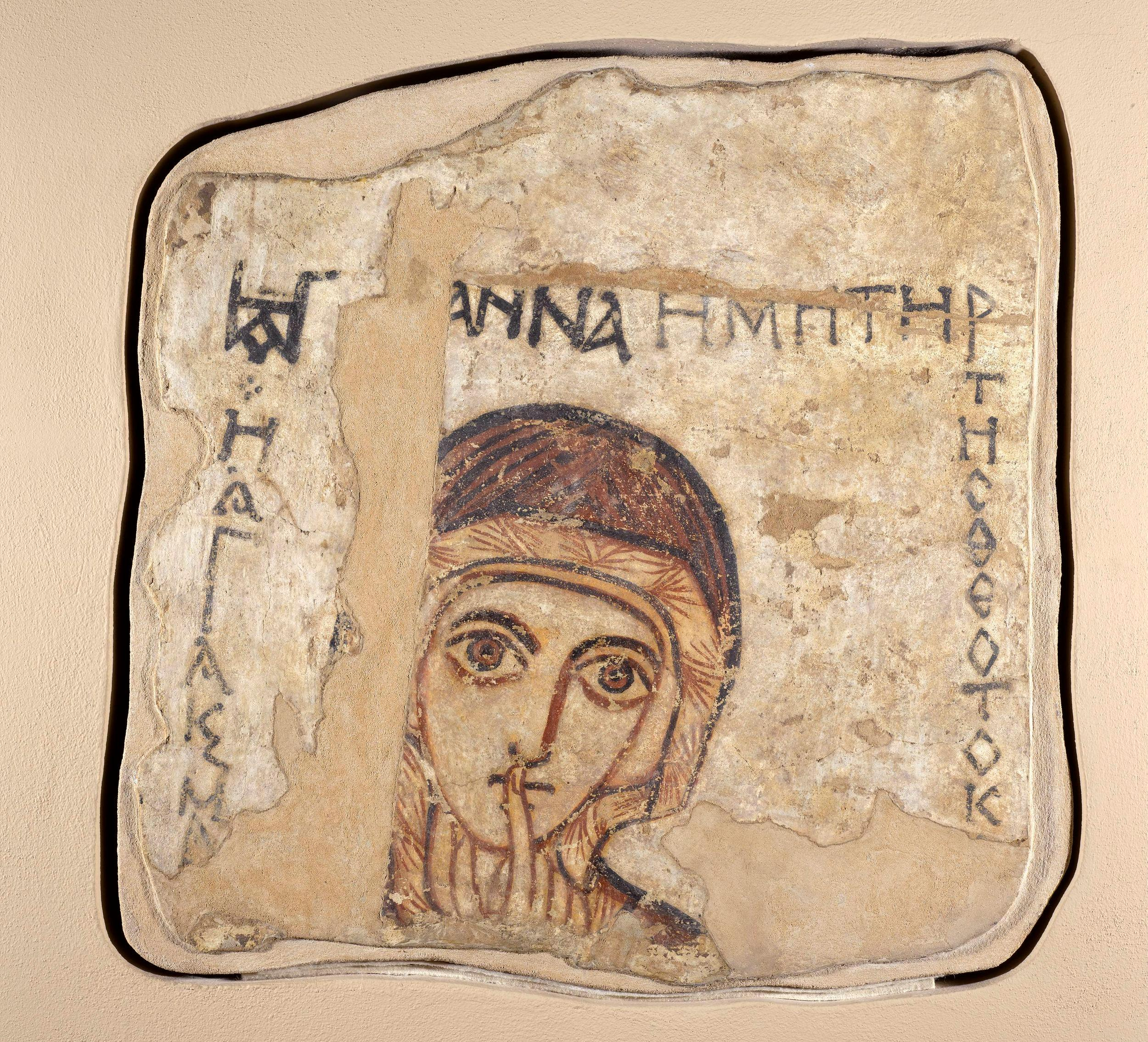
Wall painting of Saint Anne, 8th – first half of 9th century, found in Faras, National Museum in Warsaw

The Greek alphabet was adopted from neighbouring Coptic Egypt and the local language was rendered by using Greek letters. By 700 AD, a combination of Greek, Arabic, and Coptic prevailed over the Meroitic language and writing. Thus, Greek became the main language of the Church in Christian Nubia at least for the first five centuries and was used for expressing both official and private piety. Greek texts have been mostly found in epitaphs and liturgical manuscripts, as well as in wall paintings of Nubian churches and other places of religious importance, such as the monastery in Ghazali. The language was apparently widely used in those contexts until the fifteenth century, but it is assumed that around the 10th / 11th century, it was increasingly replaced by Nubian.

Analysis of Greek inscriptions on terracotta and stone shows regional differences though: in the kingdom of Makuria, the Greek language was the main linguistic vehicle for the "Byzantine-like royal court at Old Dongola", whereas in the Kingdom of Nobatia the Coptic language played a similarly important role. Hence, for example, the foundation stele of the Faras Cathedral was carved in both languages.

There is also evidence of interaction during the times of the Mamluk rule over Egypt: a Greek Eunuch from their court was exiled to the Nubian port of Suakin at the Red Sea coast in the late 15th century. However, the end of Christianity in Nubia around that time did not necessarily mean the end of contact with Greeks in what is now Sudan, since at least in the late 17th century, some Greek merchants settled in the Funj Sultanate of Sennar.

One century later, the Scottish explorer James Bruce was accompanied by two Greeks during his travels, when he traced the source of the Blue Nile. Another Greek is reported to have travelled to Darfur in 1796, but to have been executed there for attempting to assassinate the Sultan, who had refused him permission to return to Egypt.

=== Modern times ===
==== Turkiya (1821–1885) ====
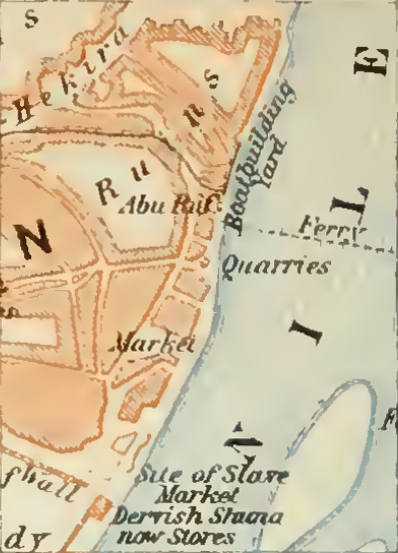
The Abu Ruf quarter on a 1914 map

When the Turkish-Egyptian forces of the Ottoman Khedive Mohamed Ali conquered the Funj kingdom in 1821, the invading army reportedly included Greek mercenaries of Arvanite origin. The chief military doctor was a Greek named Dimitrios Botsaris. In 1822, he was killed along with the Khedive's son Ismail in an ambush by Mek Nimr. Ali himself is reported to have taken some of his Greek business partners to Sudan, for instance in 1838 a certain Michalis Tossitsas on a mission in search of gold mines, as well as his personal physician Spiros Laskaris Bey.

More Greeks followed in subsequent years from Egypt, not only as military officers and soldiers, but also as interpreters, some of whom guided expeditions further southward, as well as medical doctors and pharmacists, who opened several drug stores. However, there were especially Greek merchants who came through Egypt with its established Greek trading-houses to trade in ivory, leather, ostrich feathers, and gum arabic.

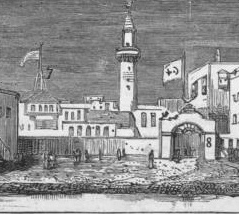
The Greek Consulate in Suakin, 1871 illustration

Their commercial activity and the number of merchants greatly increased after the monopoly of trade was abolished in 1849 and the White Nile was opened for navigation. Some also became involved in the trade of slaves from what was later to become South Sudan. The Greek historian Antonios Chaldeos, who wrote his PhD thesis about the history of the Greek communities in Sudan, suggested from the local histories of Omdurman residents that one of those slave-traders was actually George Averoff, who is still widely considered a "philanthropist" and "one of the great national benefactors of Greece". The Omdurman quarter of Abu Ruf is still today named after Averoff. Moreover, Greek entrepreneurs in Kassala and Gedaref used slaves on their cotton plantations in the 1870s.

Photos taken in Khartoum by the French diplomat Louis Pierre Vossion in 1882

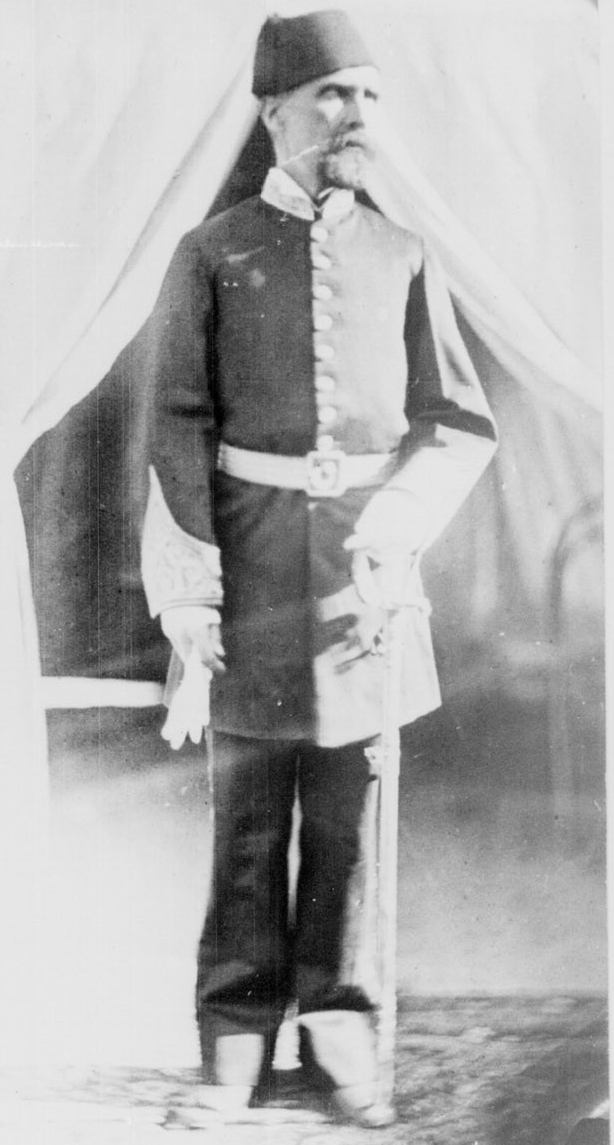
Marcopoli Bey

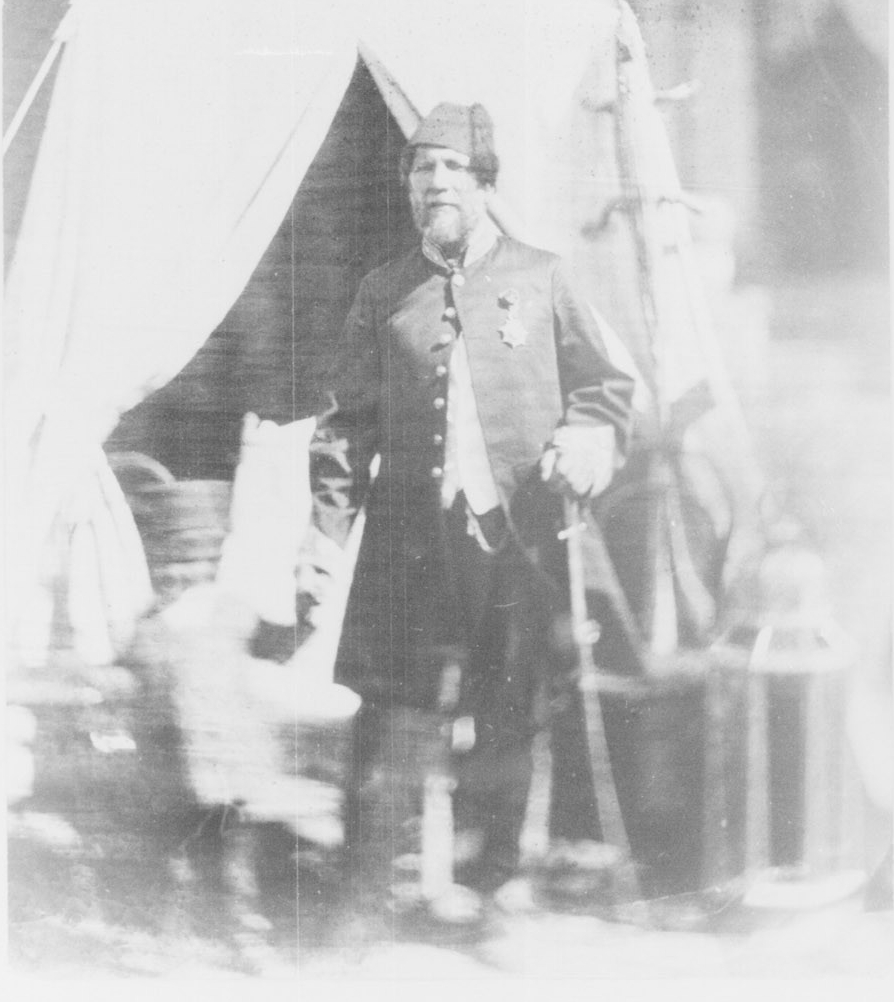
Georgios Douloghlu

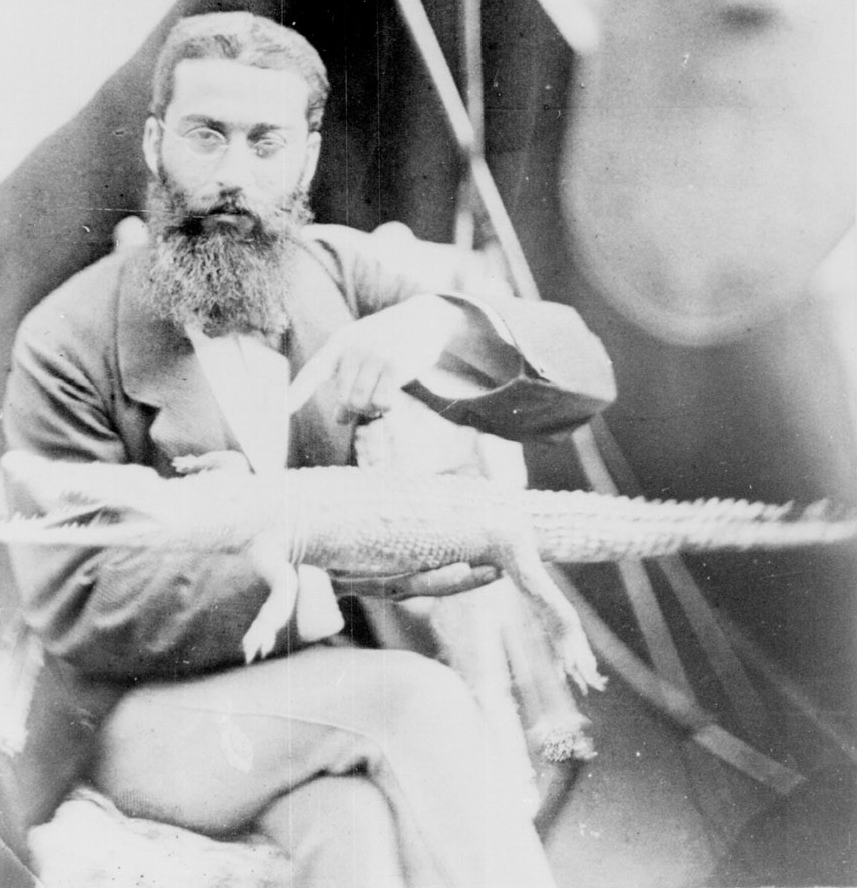
Xenophon Xenoudakis

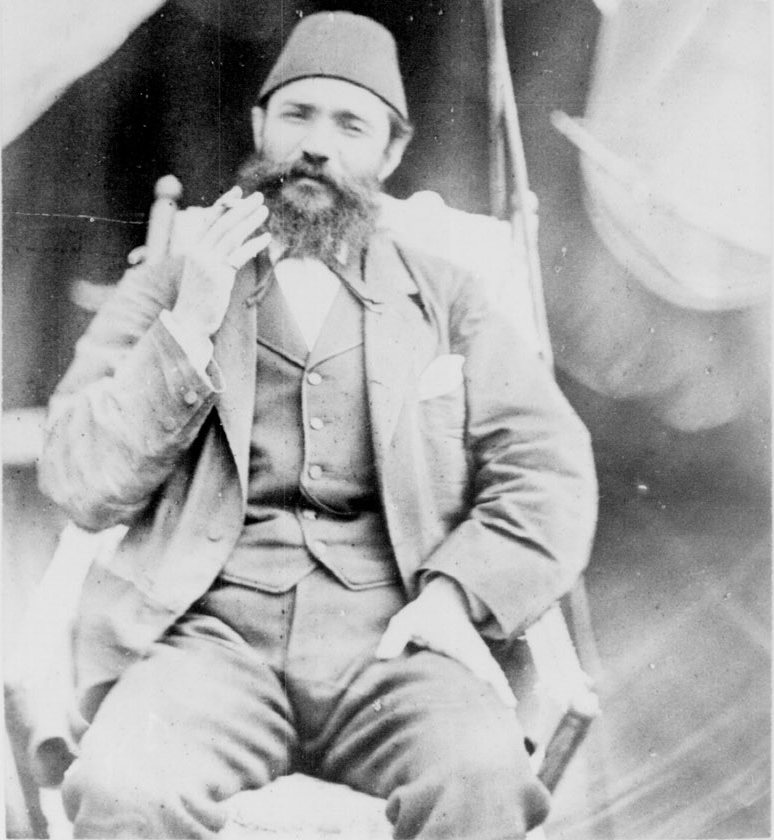
Consul Leontides

While for the first five decades of the Turkiya most of the Greeks settled in Omdurman, the port town of Suakin on the Red Sea coast became another favourite destination after the opening of the Suez Canal in 1869. El Obeid and Bara in Kordofan also had large and stable Greek communities. In 1871, the Kingdom of Greece apparently established a consulate in Suakin (see illustration) and a vice-consulate in Khartoum, mainly to cater to the needs of Greek merchants. These were among the very first diplomatic representations in Sudan. According to the written account by one of the Greek settlers, there were 193 Greeks in Sudan in 1881, of whom 132 were based in Khartoum and Omdurman. However, there were apparently no Greek-Orthodox churches or established priests during the Turkiya.

Other Greeks did not come to Sudan for commercial reasons though. For instance, Panayotis Potagos, a Greek traveller and physician, explored southern Darfur and Bahr El Ghazal in 1876–77.

The indigenous Mahdist insurrection against the colonial rule of the Turkiya was apparently partly sparked by Marcopoli Bey, the Greek private secretary to the Governor General Muhammad Raouf Pasha: according to Reginald Wingate, Marcopoli – also known as Marcopoulis – advocated for bringing Muhammad Ahmad, the self-proclaimed redeemer (Mahdi) of the Islamic world, to Khartoum for an investigation into his intentions. As a result of the failed expedition, Ahmad went into open rebellion, and Marcopoli went on to become sub-governor of Massawa.

His fellow countrymen and -women were soon affected by the Mahdist uprising as well. In early 1883, five Greeks took part in the defense of El Obeid. After the fall of the city, ten Greeks were taken captive by the insurgents and forced to convert to Islam, but got altogether treated in a rather "friendly" manner. Three Greeks agreed to marry Catholic nuns pro forma in order to protect them. The newly appointed Governor-General Charles Gordon later ironically wrote in his diary:

«The union of the Greek and Latin Church came true through these marriages».

At least five Greeks, who fought on the side of the Ottoman forces, were killed in various battles against the Mahdists. One of them was the Ottoman surgeon-general of Sudan Georgios Douloghlu, a Greek born in Egypt. He died when a Turco-Egyptian force was annihilated by the rebels in November 1883. A Greek trader reportedly played a key role in this crucial event as a guide of this ill-fated expedition, led by William Hicks Pasha, and was later suspected of misleading it on purpose. Allegedly, some Greek merchants also joined the camp of the Mahdi deliberately as renegades and served in important positions of his army.

More Greeks were taken captive in the course of the rebellion, for instance a grocer at El Fasher after the capitulation of Darfur at the end of 1883. Five Greeks served in the army units commanded by Rudolf Slatin in Darfur, who surrendered after Hicks' defeat. Three of them were killed during previous battles, while two were captured and taken to Omdurman.

In the wake of these events, more than half of the 132 Greeks who used to live in Khartoum evacuated from the city, before the Mahdist forces started their siege in March 1884. A few months later, the Mahdi reportedly sent a Greek merchant, who had converted to Islam after his capture, to negotiate with Gordon, but the British Pasha refused to meet him.

In September 1884, a group of Europeans – including 16 Greeks – made an attempt to evacuate from Khartoum on the riverboat Abbas, but the vessel ran aground. According to some sources, its passengers were massacred, whereas others claim that the Greeks were taken as prisoners.

By January 1885, 54 Greeks still remained in Khartoum. Gordon appointed the Greek Consul Nicos Leontides as Deputy Governor and the medical doctor Xenophon Xenoudakis as consultant to his office. Several other Greeks volunteered as soldiers, particularly as the personal guard of Gordon, who likened them to the 300 Spartan fighters at the battle of Thermopylae.

==== Mahdiya (1885–1898) ====
Greek families in Omdurman (1898)
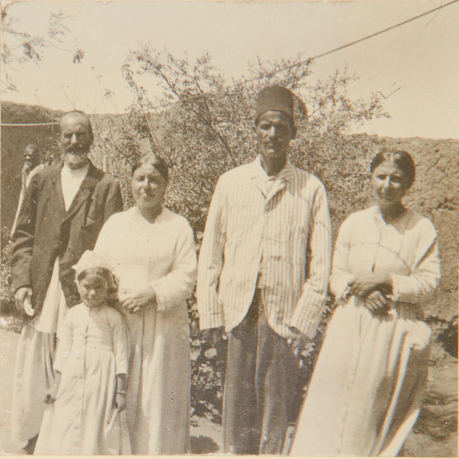
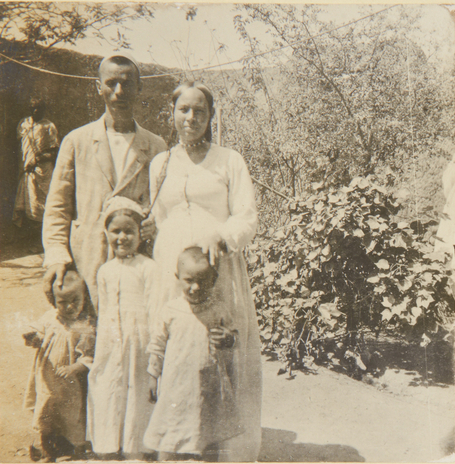

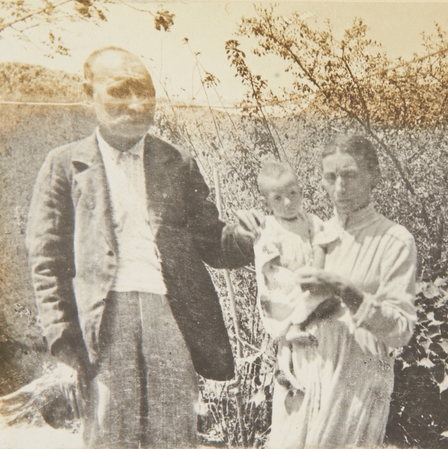
Kokorembas and Grigolini with one of their two sons in Omdurman (1898)

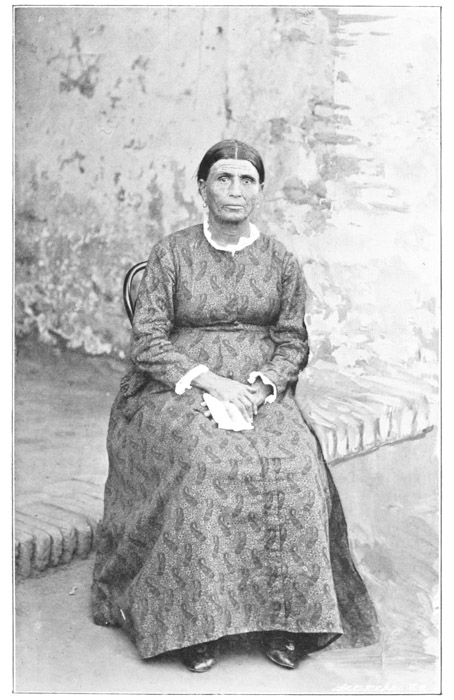
Katarina Kakou in 1899

When the Mahdists finally conquered Khartoum in January 1885, several Greeks were amongst those killed by the victorious dervishes. Most of them died during combat near the ammunition depot, and one of these victims was the doctor Xenoudakis. Consul Leontides was brutally executed. Of the 54 Greeks, who had remained in the city until the end of the siege, only seven survived. One of them managed to hide Gordon's diary.

Eight months later, shortly after the death of the Mahdi, Mahdist commander Osman Digna had two Greeks executed in Kassala. The other Greeks who had lived there had earlier been evacuated to Abyssinia by forces of the Ethiopian Emperor Yohannes IV upon the request of the Greek Consul in Suez.

Those Greeks, who had been captured and kept alive, were forced to convert to Islam. Altogether though, it seems that the Mahdi's successor, the Khalifa, had them treated relatively mildly, especially in the beginning. By the account of the Austrian missionary Josef Ohrwalder, who managed to escape after ten years, many Greeks continued to do "fairly well in business". They were even allowed to travel, but were restricted to Omdurman after a number of Europeans escaped, including three Greeks, two of whom fled along with two nuns. Over the years, ten Greeks died in prison.

There were about twenty Greek captives in Omdurman: those who had survived the siege of Khartoum and others who had been captured in other towns. The representative of the group became Dimitris Kokorembas who had been living in El Obeid. He married the Catholic Sister Teresa Grigolini, who had been the Lady Superior of the monastery in Kordofan. Altogether five Greeks married nuns in order to protect them. Kokorembas and Grigolini had two sons, reportedly after Father Ohrwalder had decided that she should make the sacrifice in order to pretend to the Mahdists that the marriages between the Greeks and the nuns were not just fake. Panayotis Trampas was later decorated by the Austrian Emperor Franz Josef for protecting a nun, whom he took pro forma as his wife. Other Greeks married Sudanese women.

One of the Greek captives succeeded in producing gunpowder for the Mahdi and started construction of a luxurious home, but was killed along with another Greek, when the powder keg exploded in 1891.

Another one, Nicolas Papadam, wrote his memoir after the end of the Mahdist State, painting an extraordinarily humanising portrait of the Mahdi, the Khalifa and the Mahdist movement, especially in contrast to "the arrogant, tyrannical and hated Turkish rule." Makris concludes:

«The Mahdi's label of the Greeks as 'men of trade' with no responsibility for political and social developments summarizes the way the Sudanese have always seen the Greek settlers. Naturally, this conception has been warmly embraced by the Greeks themselves although, strictly speaking, it has never corresponded to reality.»

Thus, the Greek captives held out in Omdurman for more than 13 years, though it may be argued that some of them might have had no particular desire to leave, especially those who had been born and brought up in Sudan. The German Charles Neufeld, who was held as a prisoner in Omdurman for twelve years before being freed after the Battle of Omdurman, praised in his memoirs especially "the old Greek lady, Catarina—who was a ministering angel alike to prisoners and captives". Still today, Katarina Street near the International airport of Khartoum is named after Katarina Kakou.

Meanwhile, more Greek merchants moved to Suakin, which stayed under Egyptian and, respectively, British control. Its harbour became a strategic hub for plans to re-take the Sudan. The traders mainly engaged in catering to the needs of the military. There were fourteen canteens run by Greeks like Angelo Capato, who went on to become one of the most eminent businessmen in Sudan. He also started the first ice factory and was contracted to supply meat to the troops.

Likewise, when an Anglo-Egyptian army under Herbert Kitchener's command began moving up the Nile in 1896 to defeat the Mahdists, Greek traders followed the expedition to provide those forces with supplies, especially food and drinking water for the workers involved in the construction of the railway network, thus literally paving the way for the British-led re-conquest. Amongst them were Capato, John Cutsuridis, Theocharis Kotsikas and Nicola Loiso, who all became famous business tycoons in Sudan. The Sudanese historian Hassan Dafalla writes that

«there was a saying, during those imperialistic days, that whenever a British officer was sent for military conquest, a Greek grocer always accompanied him with his whisky ration.»

==== Anglo-Egyptian Condominium (1899–1955) ====
===== Colonial stalwarts (1899–1938) =====
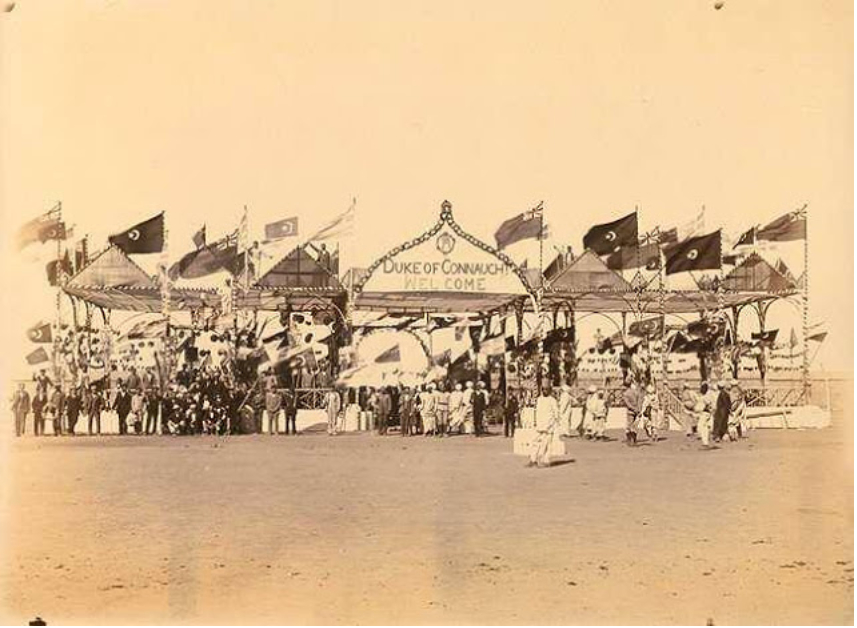
Grandstand erected by the Greeks of Khartoum with British, Egyptian, and Greek flags to welcome the Duke of Connaught in 1899

When Kitchener's forces defeated the Mahdist army in 1898, they counted a community of 87 Greeks in Omdurman, including non-Greek family members. Many of them, like their dean Dimitri Kokorembas and the later chronicler Nicolas Papadam, chose to remain in the British-dominated Anglo-Egyptian Sudan.

This nucleus of the Greek community was immediately enlarged by interpreters and merchants, who entered the Sudan with the invading army, either from the Red Sea or along the Nile. The latter specialized as contractors in supplying logistics to the military and the newly established government. Some Greeks also officially served in the Anglo-Egyptian administration, particularly in the Railways and Steamers Department, as clerks and technical staff. Altogether, the symbiotic association between the colonial regime and the Greek settlers essentially defined the Hellenic presence in Sudan during the first half of the 20th century.

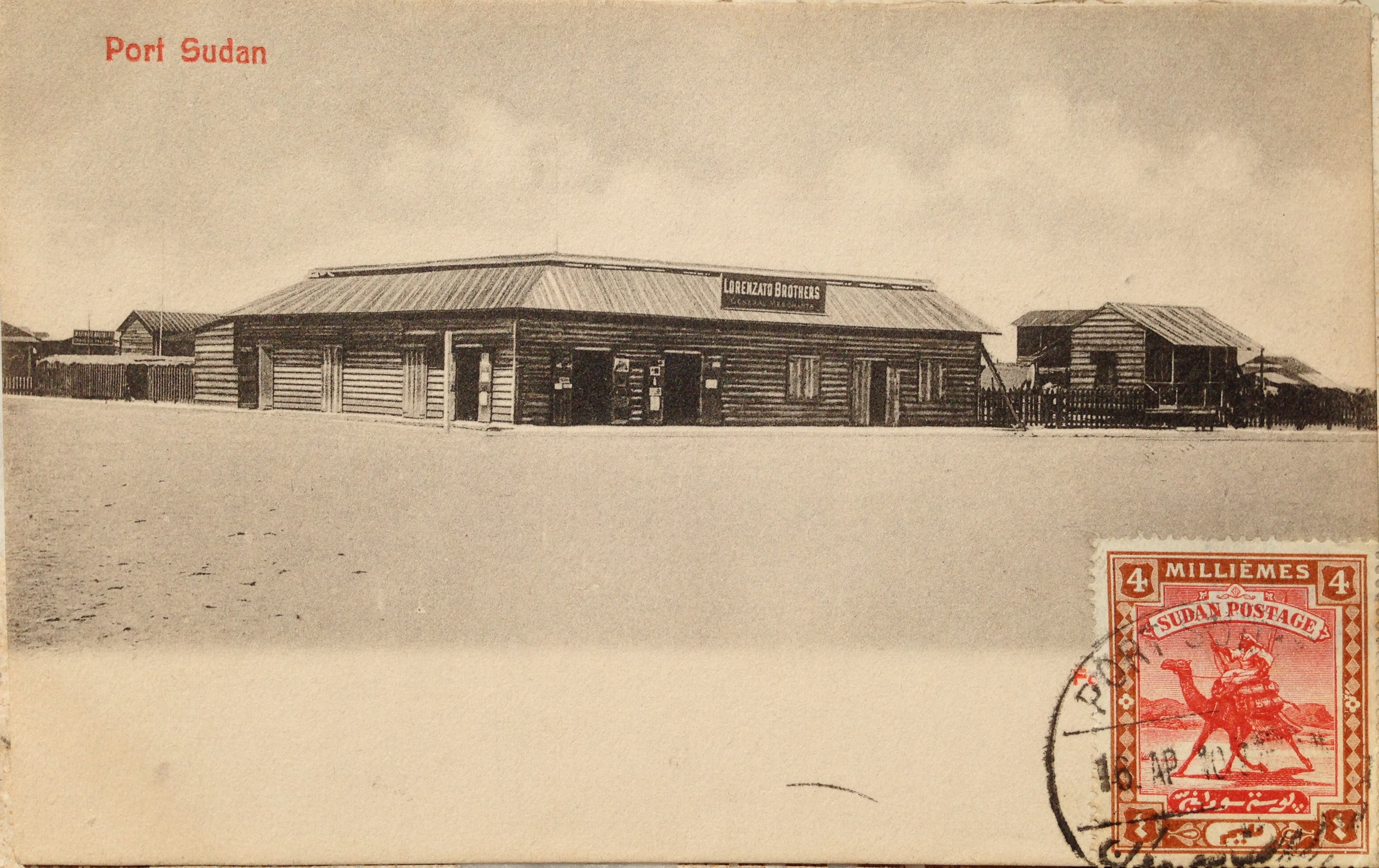
George Lorenzato from Cephalonia, who worked for Capato in Suakin until 1901 and his brother ran this store and bar – especially popular with Europeans – until 1937 in Port Sudan

Makris and the Norwegian historian Endre Stiansen conclude that from the point of view of the British-dominated government the Greeks were the ideal expatriates: "Capato – and probably many other Greeks – saw themselves as stalwarts of the 'colonial' order." Makris has also found that "Greeks from Sudan remembered and emphasized the good relations they had with the Sudanese because, unlike the British, they were not 'colonialists', but rather people of a humble background. This, however, did not prevent them from having racist attitudes towards non-Greek Sudanese, or even people of mixed origin, similar to those other Europeans had." However, Makris does concede "a healthy scepticism towards the British, the French and the other 'Big Powers' and their political schemes".

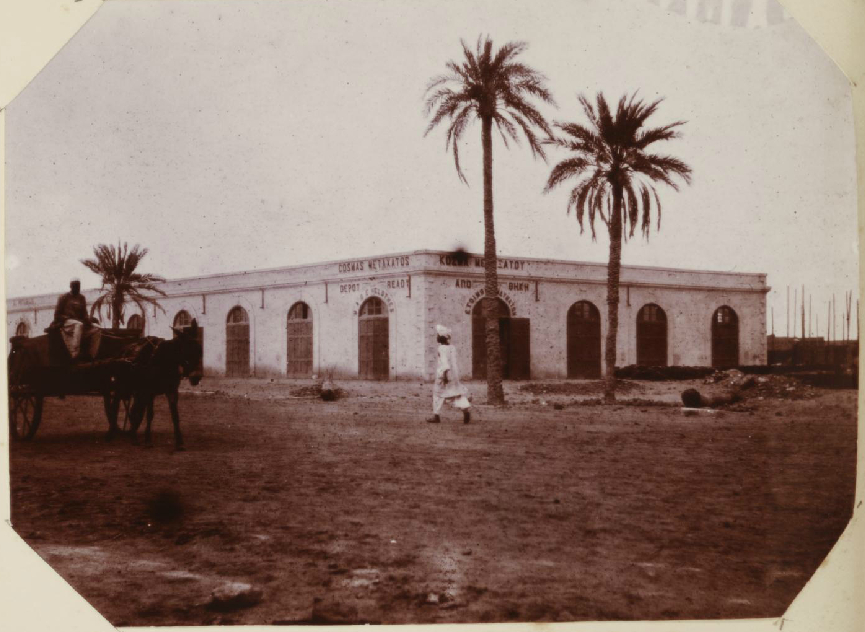
"Cosmos Metaxatos ready made clothes depot" in Khartoum, 1903

While the Sudanese middle classes struggled to recover from the crushing defeat of 1898, the Greek traders effectively dominated the market for more than two decades. Already during the first months, Greek speculators purchased land "for trifling sums" in the Khartoum area, so that "much of the most valuable land in the new city passed thus at once into the hands of a few wealthy capitalists". The same happened in the fertile Gezira until the introduction of regulation in 1905. One of those who acquired large estates was Capato. This buying spree, until it was curbed by the government, led to a substantial increase in prices, which in turn induced many urban residents to sell their land.

However, not all of the Greeks who came to Sudan were stereotypically merchants and shopkeepers, but there were many other professions as well, including teachers, physicians, pharmacists, scientists, and engineers. During the 1900s and 1910s, many Greeks, particularly from the island of Karpathos, came to work as builders, carpenters, masons, and other craftsmen. Greek contractors and subcontractors constructed governmental buildings in Khartoum – including the reconstruction of the Governor-General's palace – the new port and town of Port Sudan. They also constructed churches such as the All Saints' Anglican Cathedral on Gordon Avenue in Khartoum, designed by Polychronis Zavolas, as well as the mosque in Ed Dueim. Moreover, they were involved in setting up irrigation canals for cotton plantations and in the expansion of the railway network. Some of them worked even in remote places like Darfur. Most prominently, Dimitrios Fabricius, a Greek of German ancestry, who was the chief architect of the Khedive, designed landmark buildings like the Gordon Memorial College, the historic main building of today's University of Khartoum.

It is still possible to identify a broad pattern of Greek immigration into Sudan that applies also to the Greek diaspora in other parts of Africa: as soon as a Greek, like Capato, had established his business, he would bring in younger compatriots from Greece or Egypt, preferably from his family network. The newly arrived would often work as employees for the first years and then open their own businesses. In this way, it came about that many of the Greeks in Sudan at the beginning of the 20th century originated from the islands of Karpathos (see above), Lesbos, Cephalonia, and Cyprus.

Thus the number of Greeks grew rapidly: in 1902, there were already about 150 in the Khartoum area. In the same year the 'Hellenic Community' of the capital was officially established. Among its founding fathers were businessmen like Capato, John Cutsuridis, and Panayotis Trampas, who had survived the Mahdiya as a captive. Very soon after that, a branch of the Community was founded in Atbara, where many Greeks worked in the headquarters of the Sudan railways network or ran bars. The Greek community school of Khartoum was established in 1906 with 30 students. Their number doubled within the first decade. Also in 1906, the Hellenic Community of Port Sudan was founded. These societies not only undertook educational functions, but also religious ones, as well as offering assistance to their poorer members.

Already in 1901, the Condominium government had given a free grant of land in Khartoum to the Greek Orthodox community to build a church. The design was provided by the architect Nikolaos Pothitos and its foundation stone was laid in 1903, but construction got only completed in 1908. The consecration took place in 1910, yet only two decades later did the Greek Orthodox synod of bishops elect a Metropolitan of Nubia, who remained based in Cairo.

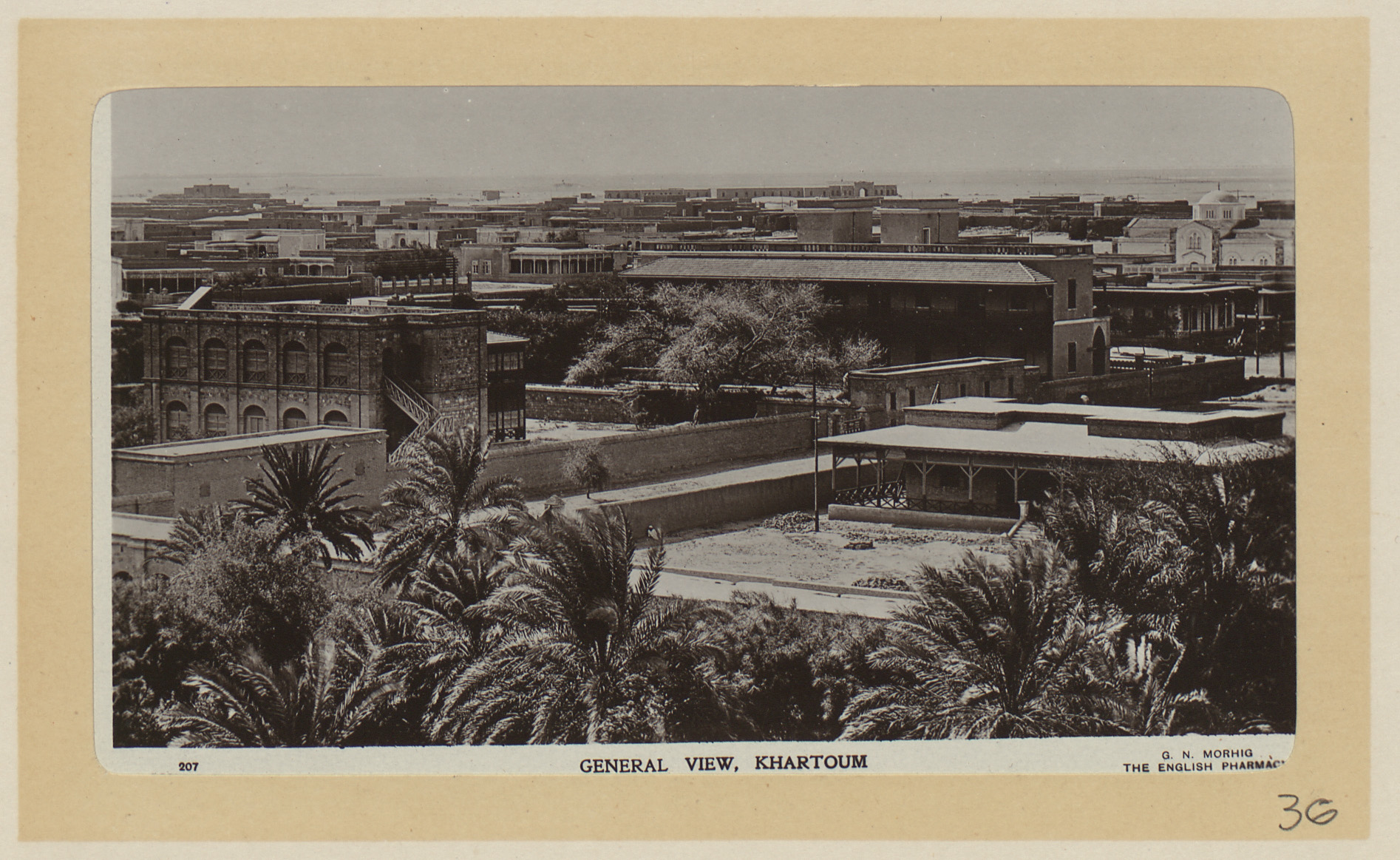
View of Khartoum with the Greek Orthodox Church of the Annunciation in the background on the far right, c. 1907

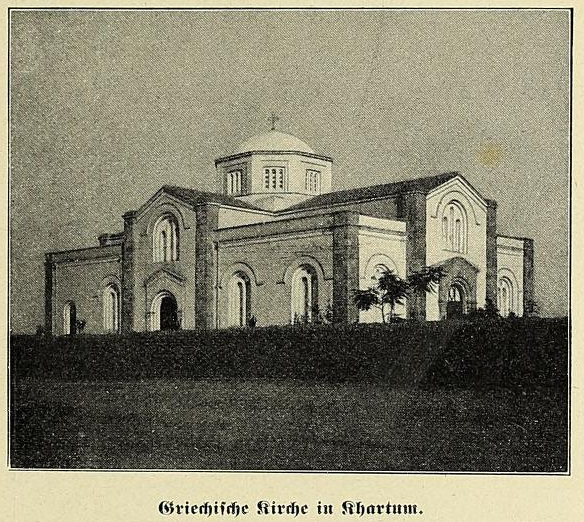
The church around 1910

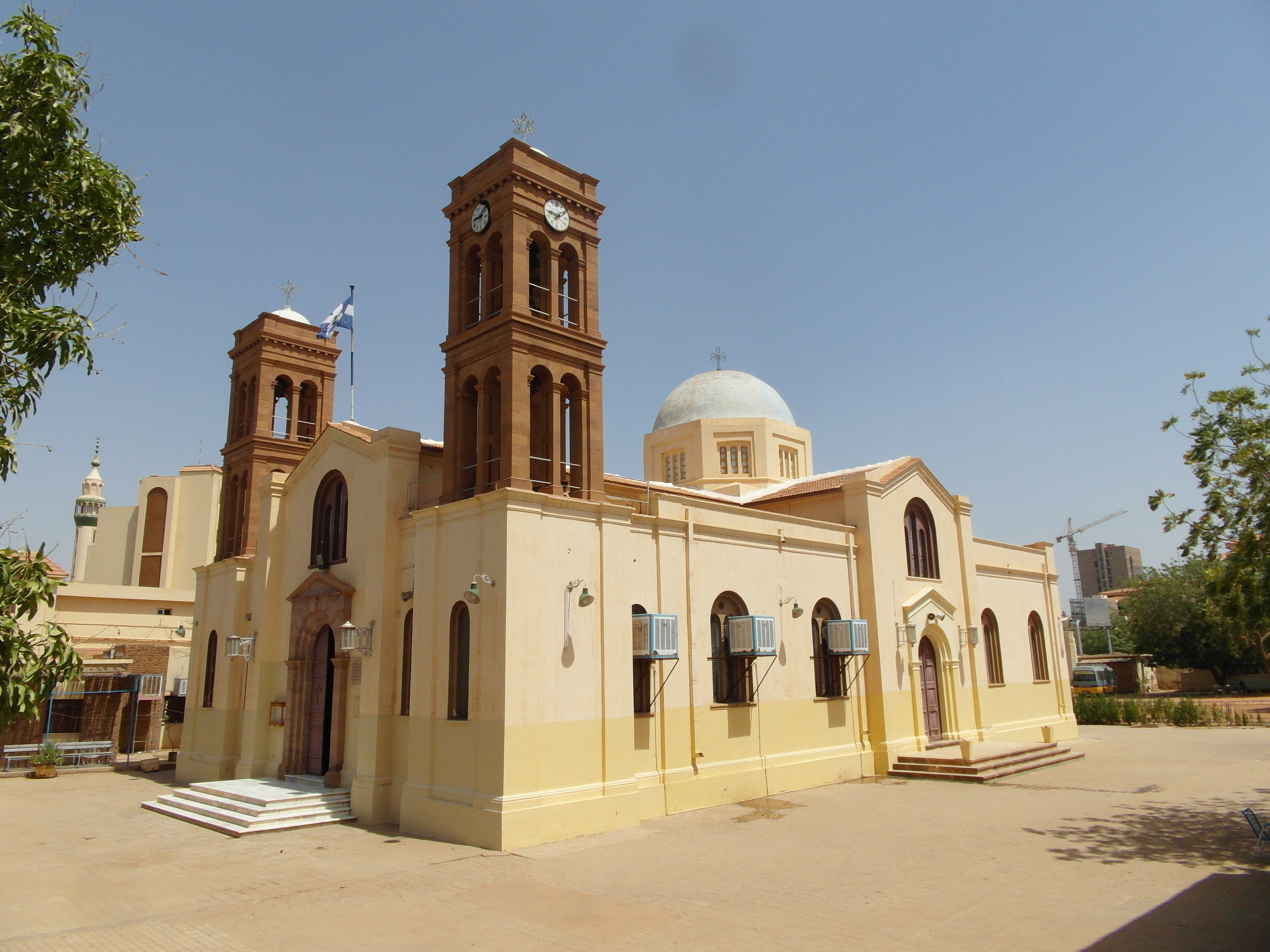
The church in 2015

Some 130 Greek volunteers from Sudan – thirty from Khartoum and a hundred from the rest of the country – fought during the Balkan wars of 1912 and 1913 against the Ottoman Empire. Fifteen of them were killed.

In 1913, the "Hellenic Shooting Club" and the "Hellenic Gymnastics Club", which had been founded five years earlier, were merged to form the "Hellenic Athletic Club" (H.A.C.) under the chairmanship of the lawyer George Fragoudis, who later went on to become a member of the Greek parliament and the founder of the Panteion School of Political Sciences of Athens.

At the beginning of World War I in 1914, there were over 800 Greeks in Sudan, by far the largest foreign community. About 500 of them were members in the former Hellenic Shooting Club, which was viewed by the administration as potentially "a very valuable supplementary European force". Some Greeks in Sudan were famous hunters and Capato, for instance, specialized in fitting out big-game hunting parties.

In 1921, the Hellenic Athletic Club participated in a local football championship, which is considered the oldest in Africa. Until today, the H.A.C. has remained active for more than a century and is still one of the most prominent Greek places in Khartoum, located in premises granted in 1947 for a long-term lease.

After the forced displacement of the Greeks from Asia Minor and the 1923 population exchange between Greece and Turkey, many of the Greek newcomers to Sudan originated from Constantinople and Smyrna, escaping abject poverty. By 1929 – when Greek businessmen built the first commercial cinema in Khartoum – the number of Greeks in Khartoum had risen to 1,455. The total number in all of Sudan at that time was at around 4,000 – up from about 2,500 in 1920. The Greek school in Khartoum had 170 students in 1925 and 270 in 1936.

During the 1930s, a multitude of private cotton growing irrigation schemes in the agricultural areas of the Gezira and Gedaref were owned by Greeks. The Hellenic Community of Wad Medani in the Gezira had already been established in 1919. From 1933 to 1937, many Greek masons and craftsmen worked in the construction of the Jebel Aulia Dam irrigation scheme, which became the largest dam in the world at the time.

Beyond the places, where Greeks had already settled before the Mahdiya, the newcomers also gradually moved to the most remote corners of the country, like En Nahud in Western Kordofan, Talodi in the Nuba Mountains and Deim Zubeir in Bahr El Ghazal. Business tycoon Capato soon expanded his business into Kordofan for gum Arabic and southern Sudan for ivory, before going bankrupt after a series of misfortunes in 1912. Some Greek traders also moved on to settle in the Belgian Congo, French Central Africa and other African lands.

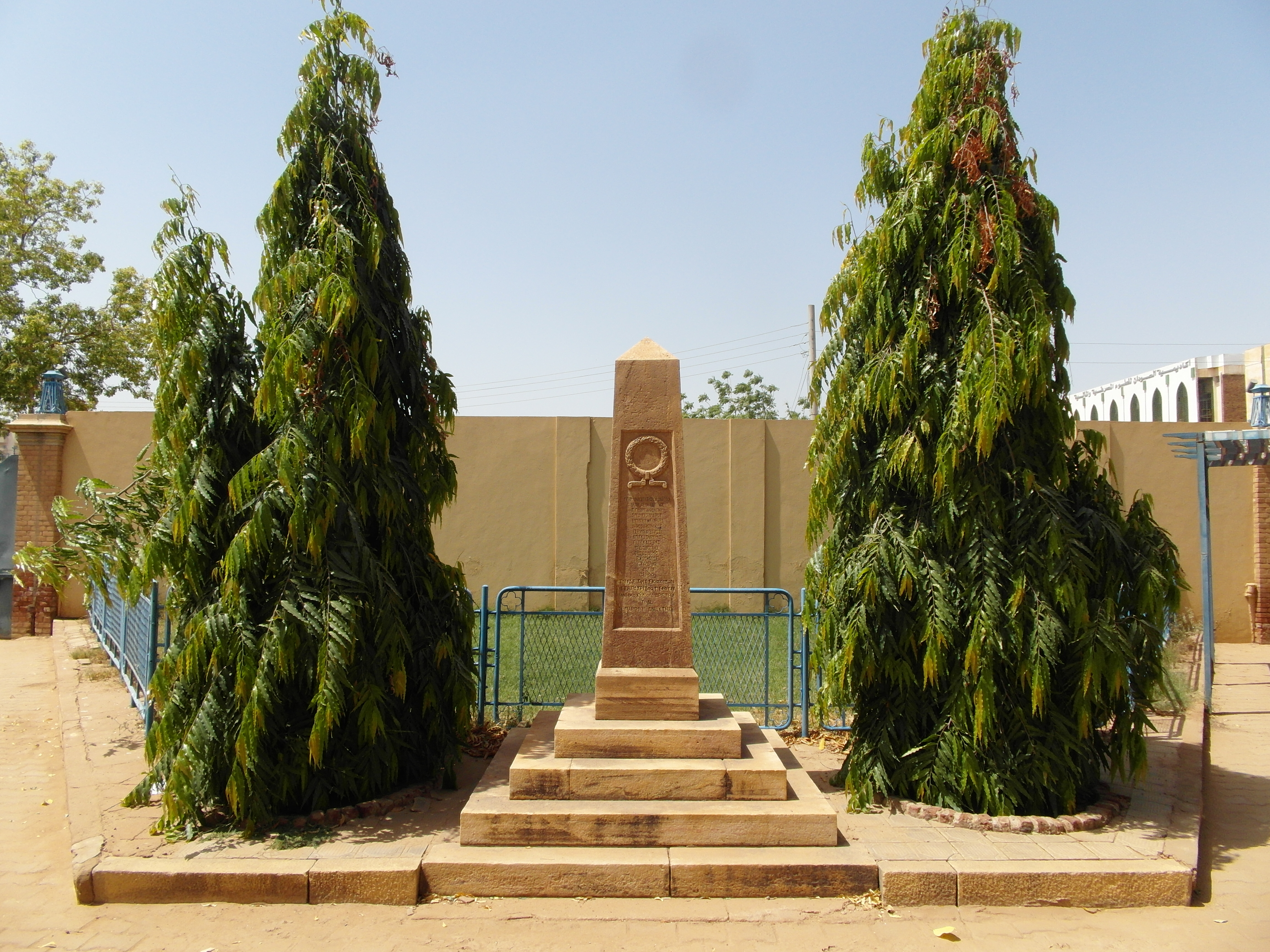
Memorial at the compound of the Hellenic Community in Khartoum for volunteers killed in the 1912 and 1913 Balkan Wars

In southern Sudan, the colonial government preferred giving licences to Greek merchants, who would go to remote places like Jonglei, rather than to northern Sudanese Jellaba traders. Juba, now the national capital of South Sudan, is said to have been established in 1922 by Greek traders. Another center was Wau, where already in 1910 fifteen Greek merchants were based and reportedly made large profits. The Comboni missionary priest Stefano Santandrea, who served in Wau from 1928 to 1948, stressed though that "their competition prevented their [Northern] rivals from exploiting the natives." The Wau-based Hellenic Community of Bahr El Ghazal was founded in 1939.

One major Sudanese city is still named after a Greek trader, over a century after he settled there: Kosti. Konstantinos "Kostas" Mourikis set up a store in this city on the White Nile, where pilgrims from West Africa to Mecca and Southern trade routes crossed, soon after he had arrived in Sudan in 1899 along with his brother.

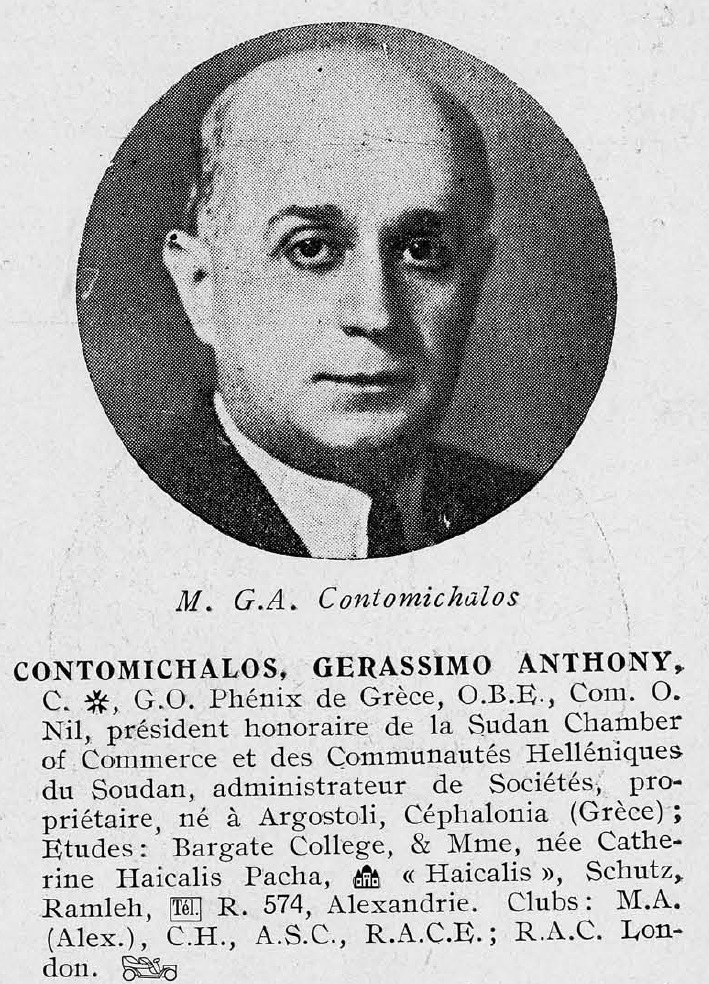

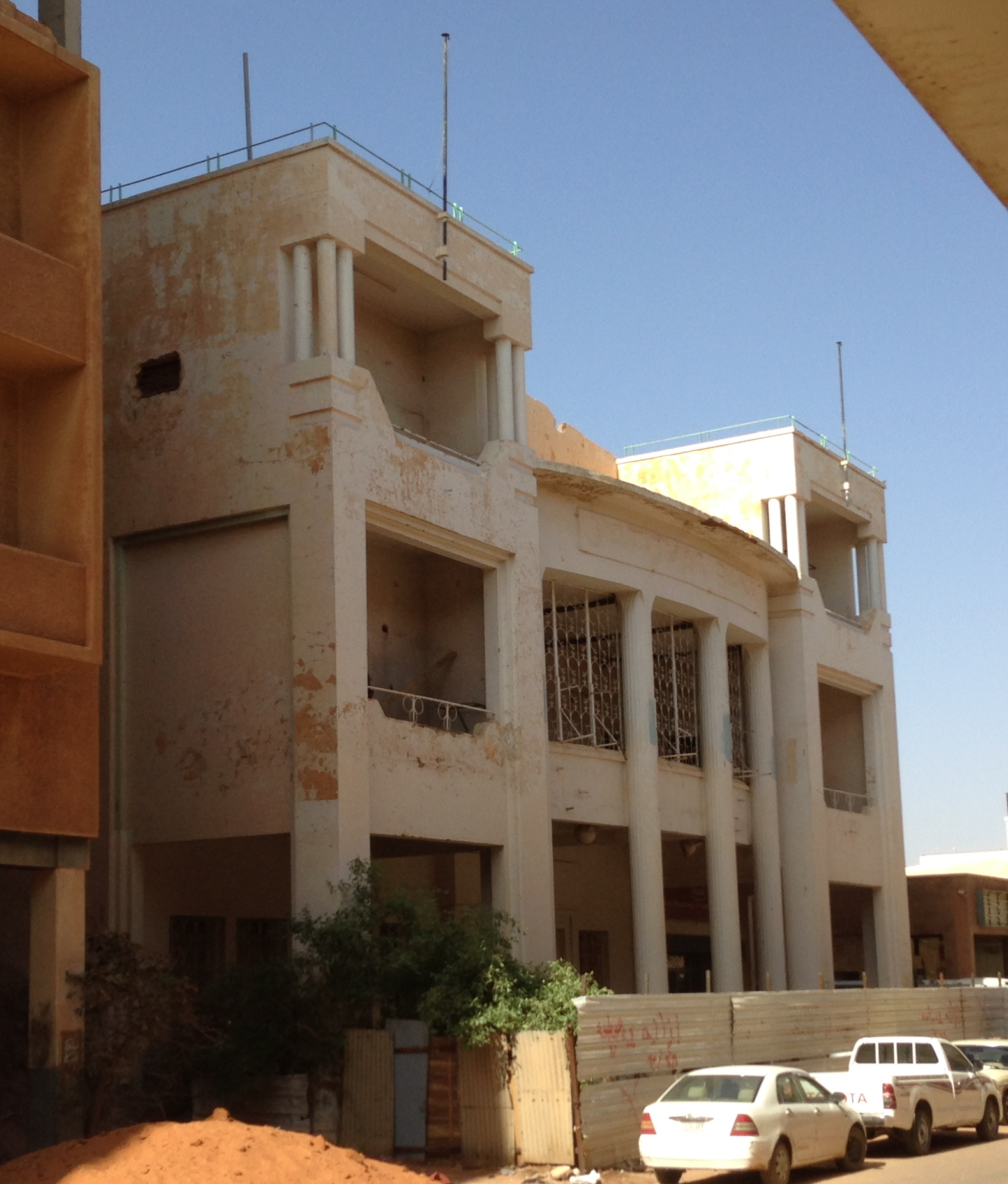
The building in Barlaman Ave in Khartoum that housed Contomichalos' company (2018)

With regard to the socio-economic composition of the Greeks in Sudan during the Condominium, Makris and Stiansen conclude:

«A small number of Greek merchants climbed up the social ladder and became founders of a 'high class' who held decisive influence over a 'middle class' or what could perhaps more aptly be called the 'salariat'. [..] With the exception of Gerasimos Contomichalos, all members of the Greek 'high class' were well-off merchants and shopkeepers, but no more than that. [...] Always mindful of developments in the political arena, Contomichalos cultivated his relations with the Government and the Palace, while at the same time supporting community leaders with nationalist aspirations. Like Capato, he served as president of the Greek community for long periods of time, but had much more impact than the former – founding churches, schools and other community buildings and offering large sums of money to assist in the establishment of smaller communities in the provinces.»

===== Alliances with Sudanese nationalists (1938–1955) =====
Contomichalos, who was a nephew of Capato developed "particularly close" ties with Abd-al-Raḥman Al Mahdi, a son of the Mahdi and one of the pro-independence nationalist leaders. He thus followed a strategy that other Greeks also pursued in order to arrange themselves with the local elites: already in 1912, two Greek merchants had founded one of the first newspapers in Sudan, the Sudan Herald and its Arabic supplement Raid Al Sudan (the "Sudan Leader"). Though it was under strong government influence and considered by the Sudanese as foreign, it still served for a few years as an early forum for Sudanese views.

In this context, it is noteworthy that when the colonial regime in 1938 allowed the formation of the Graduates Congress – a consultative assembly exclusively for educated Northern Sudanese men and the predecessor of the first political parties – many of its members had been active in the Abu Ruf group of intellectuals, which was named after the Abu Ruf quarter in Omdurman – which in turn was and still is named after the Greek merchant Averoff, who was apparently involved in slave-trade (see above). Also still today, a street in downtown Khartoum is named after Contomichalos.

Contomichalos also wielded considerable influence on politics in Greece, as he entertained a "close relationship" with Eleftherios Venizelos, the eminent leader of the Greek liberation movement. Already during World War I, Contomichalos had supported Venizelos in his power struggle with King Constantine, who favoured an alliance with the Central Powers, and secured the following of the Greek community in Sudan. This close relationship also led to the establishment of an air connection between Sudan and Greece in the early 1930s, which had been a major priority for many Greeks in Sudan.

In 1935, it seems that Contomichalos literally played the role of kingmaker: The Nile Pilot claims that "he was the one who reinstated royalism in Greece". According to Greek historians, he was invited by James Henry Thomas, the Secretary of State for the Colonies of the National Government of the United Kingdom, and successfully mediated between General Georgios Kondylis, a former Venizelist who had overthrown the government in October of that year, and King George II of Greece in his London exile. In 1936, shortly after he had regained his throne, the King endorsed the conservative totalitarian and staunchly anti-communist 4th of August Regime under the leadership of General Ioannis Metaxas. The same year, Contomichalos was awarded with several medals of the Greek state and the Orthodox Church.

As the Metaxas Regime took inspiration from Fascist Italy, Contomichalos advocated for a cooperation with the Fascist Italian regime in Ethiopia after the 1935/36 Second Italo-Ethiopian War started by dictator Benito Mussolini. Contomichalos' interest was the promotion of trade through Kassala, where almost one hundred Greeks lived at the time, and Gedaref, where his own company branch was active in the cross-border trade.

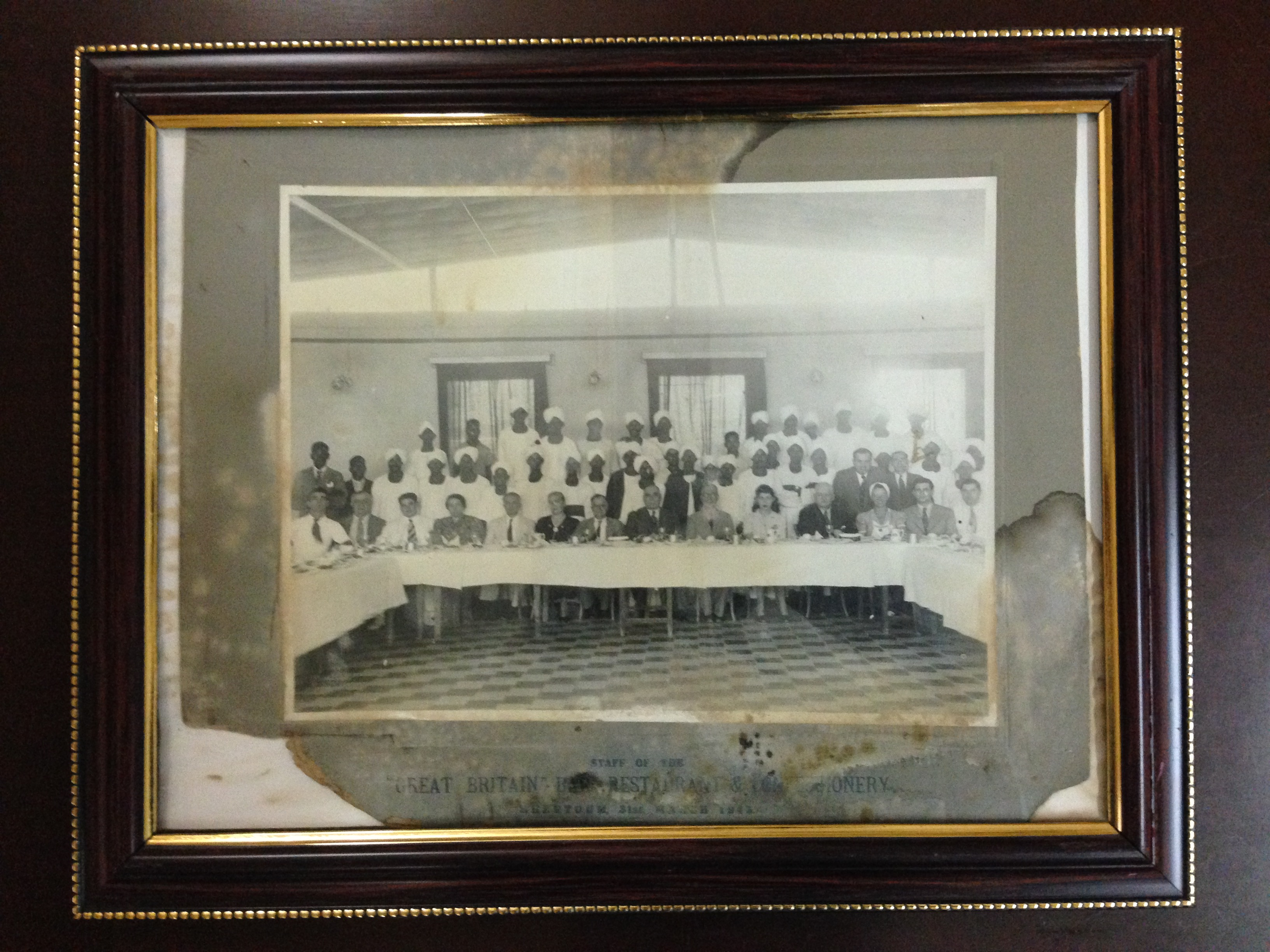
Staff of the Greek-owned "Great Britain Bar" in 1943

By the beginning of World War II, the number of Greeks in Sudan had risen to around 4,500. Those who originated from the Italian-ruled Dodecanese, and were thus Italian citizens, were excluded from imprisonment after an intervention from the Hellenic community. When the Fascist-Italian forces seized Kassala in 1940, several Greeks, who lived there, were forced into detention in Ethiopia.

Subsequently, the Sudan Defence Force, which was supporting the Allies in North Africa, was opened to Greeks as to other expatriates. Moreover, the British authorities allowed volunteers to join the Greek army on the same battlefront. According to some sources, 141 men were recruited from the Hellenic community in Sudan, while others put the number at 250. Eight were killed.

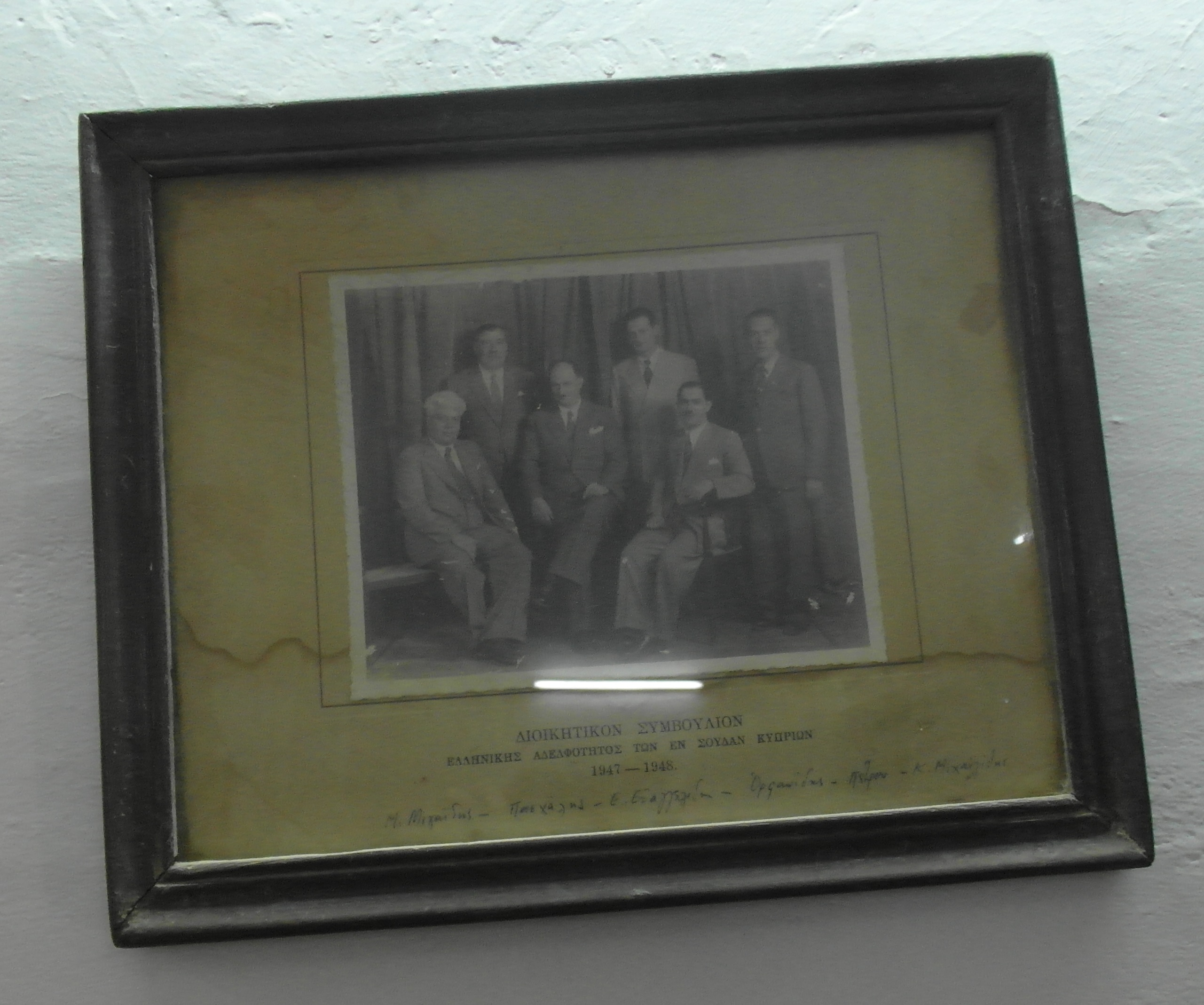
A photo from 1947 on the walls of the Hellenic Community centre in Khartoum (2015)

Meanwhile, a "National Committee of the Greeks of Sudan" was founded in order to raise funds for the exiled Greek government in Cairo, the Greek and British sections of the Red Cross, and especially to support the families of those who volunteered to join the fighting forces against the Axis powers.

Five years after the end of WW II, the number of Greeks in Sudan had grown to over 5,000. Khartoum East by that time had become known as "Little Greece" with Greek "medical clinics, clubs, retail shops, groceries, bakeries, bars, schools, and churches". Reportedly, even street signs bore Greek letters in addition to Arabic and Latin ones. The residential area was, in fact, divided into an upper and middle class.

This class-system was also characteristic for the two Greek community clubs in the capital: the Grand Club was reserved for the wealthy merchants, whereas the Apollo Club was frequented by the "salariat". This divide remained in place until the 1970s.

Likewise, voting rights in the community institution of Khartoum were not democratic, but plutocratic: in 1919 its statute had been changed to the effect that members could cast more votes if they were able and willing to pay a higher annual subscription fee. As a result, only a fraction of those Greeks who lived in Khartoum were members of the body which officially represented them. Chaldeos concludes therefore:

«Gradually the community institution turned into a closed club of rich Greeks. Additionally, women were not allowed to register.»

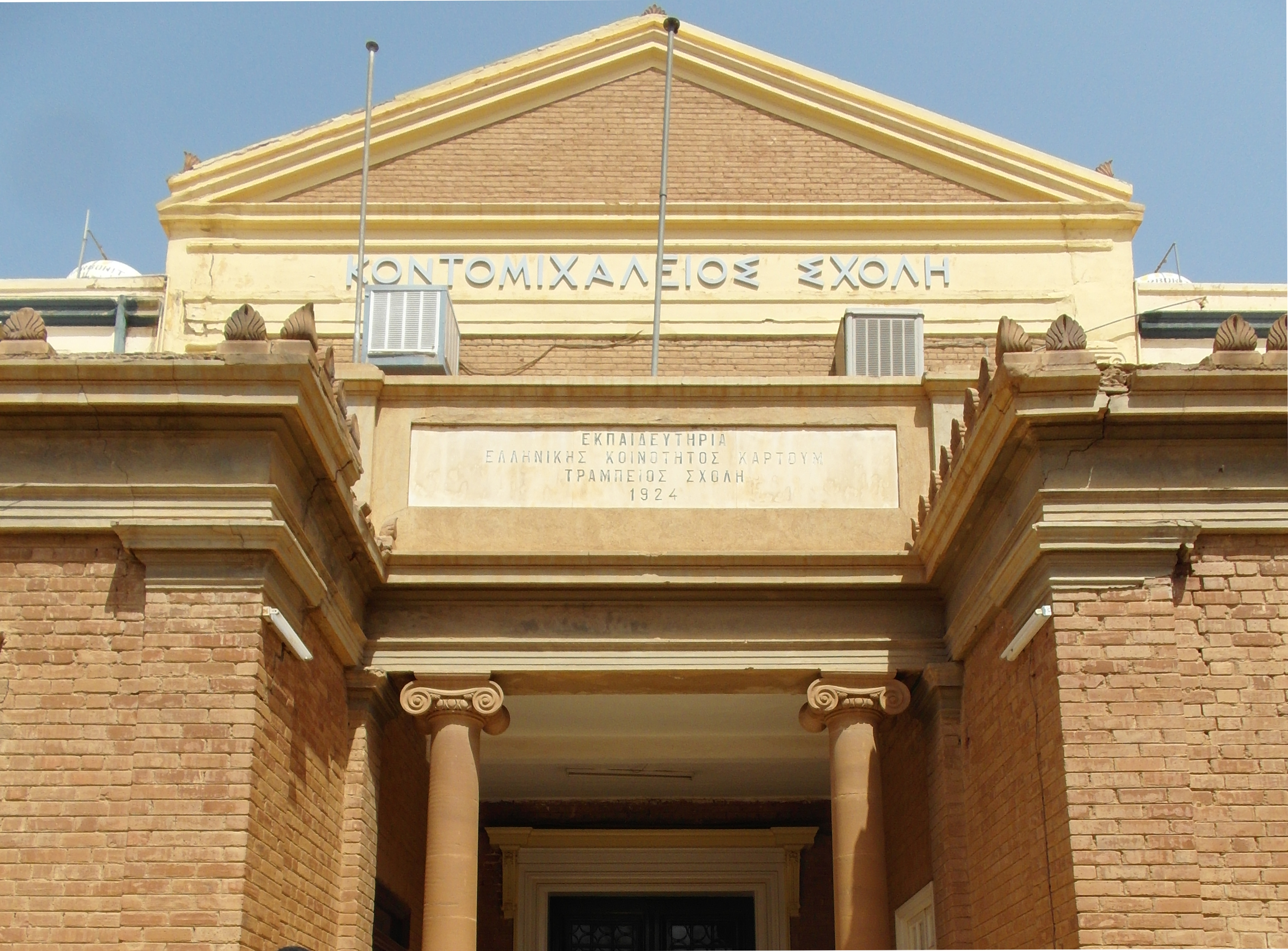
The Kontomichaleios High School and Lyceum in Khartoum (2015)

Moreover, the Greek community was divided like Greece: between anti-communists and communists. Remarkably, some Greek industrialists supported the Sudanese Communist Party (SCP). The SCP had one of its strongholds in the railways headquarters of Atbara, where also many Greeks worked until the Sudanisation of the transport system.

In contrast, some Greek businessmen kept close relations with the ruling class in Greece, especially with Sofoklis Venizelos, the second-born son of Eleftherios (see above), who served in major government positions – including as Prime Minister and Minister of Foreign Affairs respectively – during the 1940s and early 1950s. He personally held, for instance, shares in the Greek-owned "Sudan Oil Mills Ltd".

Following the Egyptian revolution of 1952 and Gamal Abdel Nasser's subsequent policies of nationalizing commercial enterprises, many members of the Greek diaspora in Egypt moved to Sudan.

In 1954, the year that Contomichalos died, his son Eleftherios donated a substantial amount of money on behalf of the family to expand the primary Trampeios School. The Kontomichaleios High School and Lyceum was opened in 1957, one year after Sudan's independence:

==== Independent Sudan (since 1956) ====
===== Peak time (1956–1969) =====
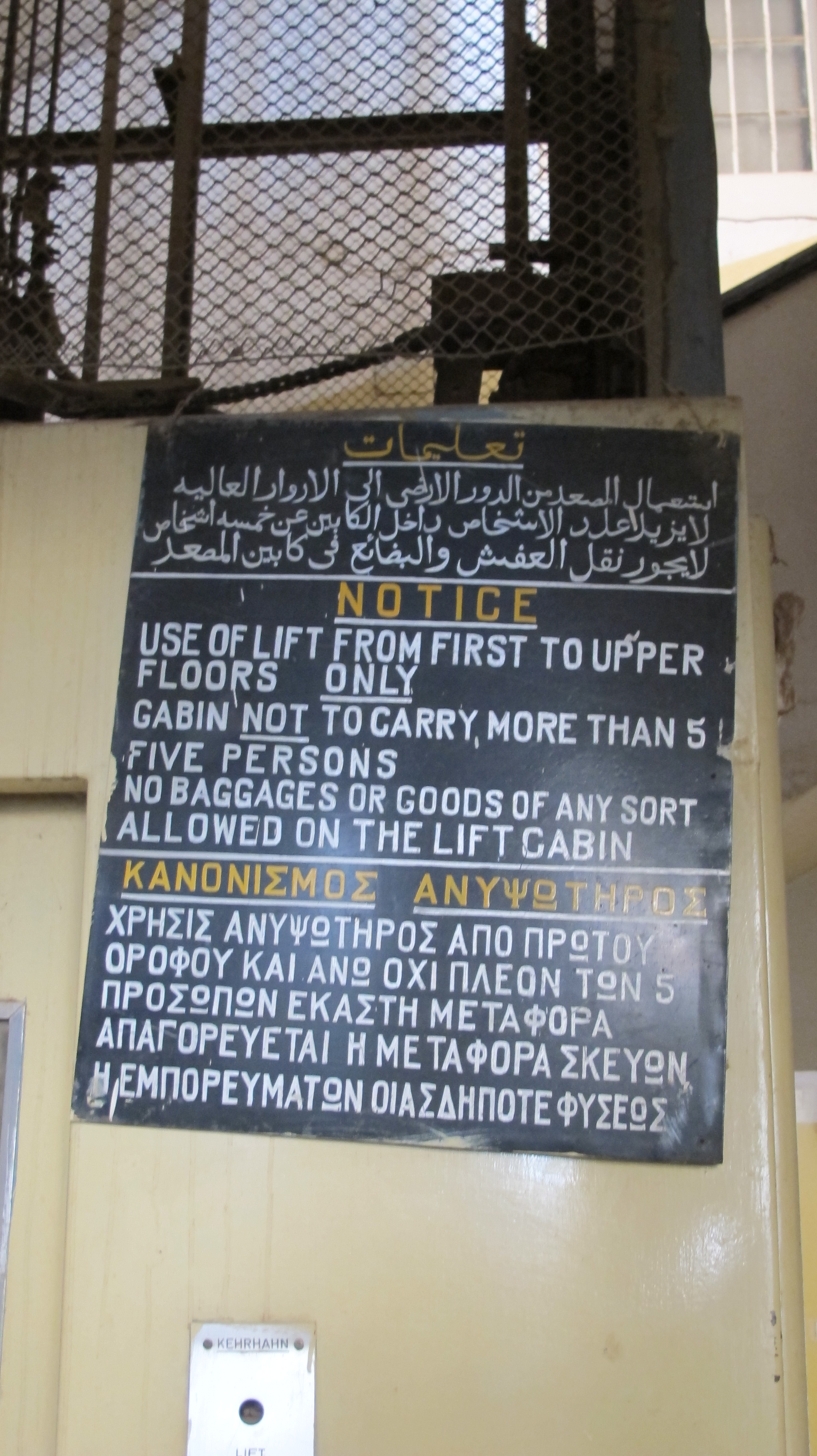
Sign at the oldest elevator in Khartoum, in the Greek-owned Slavos Building, constructed in the early 1950s

When Sudan obtained sovereignty from the Anglo-Egyptian Condominium on 1 January 1956, the Greek settlers in the country were issued Sudanese nationality certificates and generally continued to thrive in the first few years of independence. According to Chaldeos, the community reached its greatest number in 1957 at around 6,000. Makris puts the estimate at 7,000 in the 1950s. Tsakos concludes that during the first one and a half decades after independence

«the Greeks were the main (foreign) agents supporting the transition of the Sudanese society from 'former' to 'new' times. They occupied many posts in the public sector, they controlled production centres as important as the Gezira Cotton Scheme, and they influenced substantial parts of the urban economy and its everyday activities.»

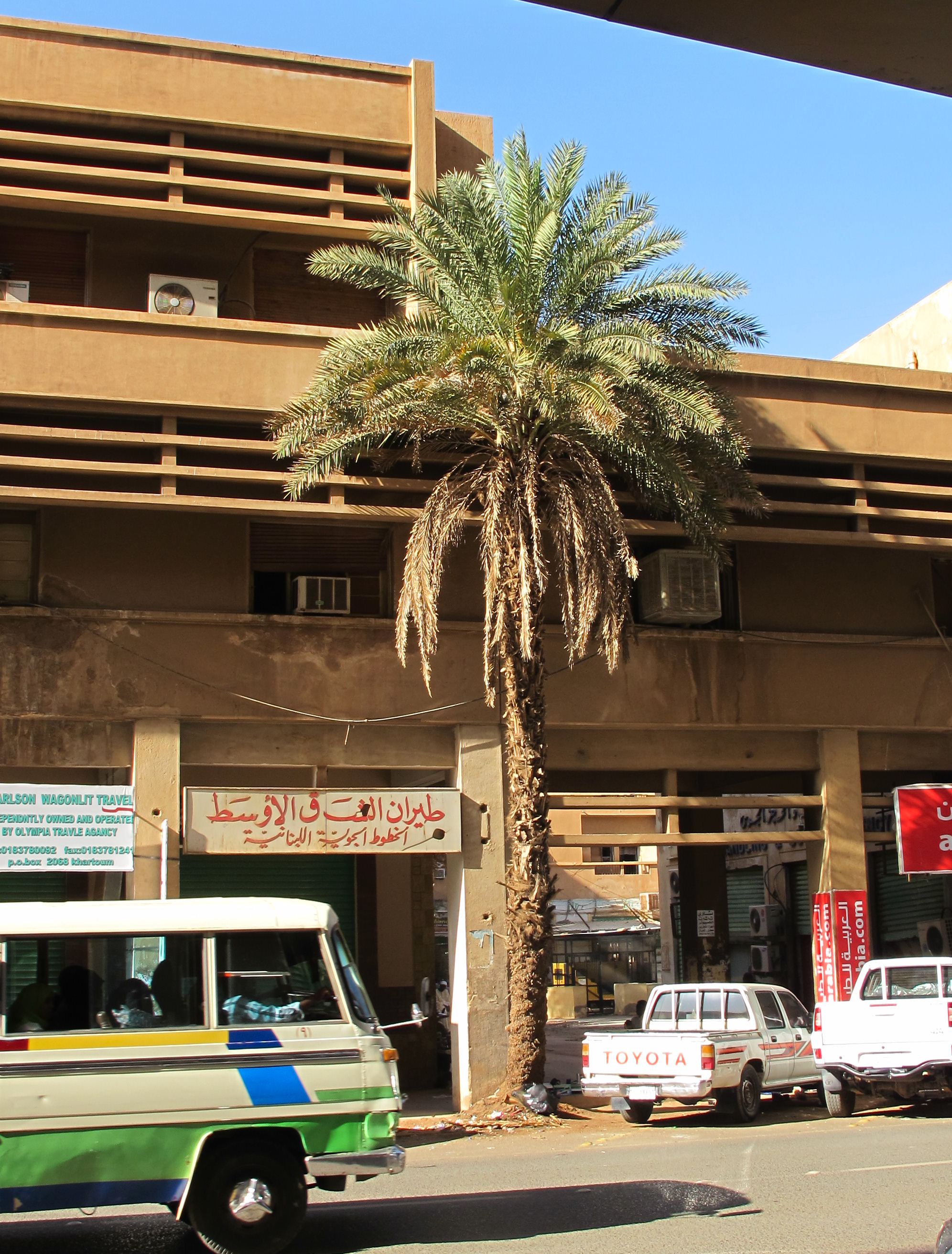
The Southern side of the Aboulela Building at Gamhurriya Street, designed by George Stefanides

Immediately after Independence, the Sudanese government commissioned the Greek architect and town planner Constantinos Apostolou Doxiadis, who also designed Islamabad, to set up the 1958 master plan for developing urban Khartoum. It espoused the concept of the Dyna-metropolis according to Doxiadis' philosophy of Ekistics and advocated unidirectional growth southwards. While the plan was never systematically implemented, Doxiades has been credited as the father of the new extension of Amarat.

Another Greek architect, the Khartoum-based George Stefanides, designed many villas in Amarat. For this, he "used a mixed vocabulary of tropical architecture together with features of his own Mediterranean culture such as balconies, window shutters and sun-breakers and white-washed facades." Stefanides also designed a lasting landmark symbol of the Greek influence on shaping the immediate post-independence era: the Aboulela Commercial Building, which was opened in 1956 just opposite the Republican Palace and "exhibits the characteristics that came to define modern architecture in Sudan".

However, following those "golden years", Chaldeos' figures show that the number of Greeks in Sudan diminished by 1965 to 4,000. One reason for this exodus was apparently the escalation of the Anyanya-rebellion in southern Sudan and the brutal counter-insurgency of successive governments in Khartoum. Still in 1960, the community in the South had given refuge to Greeks, who fled the turmoil in neighbouring Congo.

Yet, a few years later, they themselves came under pressure: after an Anyanya assault on Wau in early 1964, the military regime of Ibrahim Abboud reportedly "announced that foreign traders would only be allowed to reside in provincial or district capitals in the South, where they could be kept under surveillance, and not in villages. This restriction was aimed at Syrian and Greek traders, who were suspected of helping the rebels."

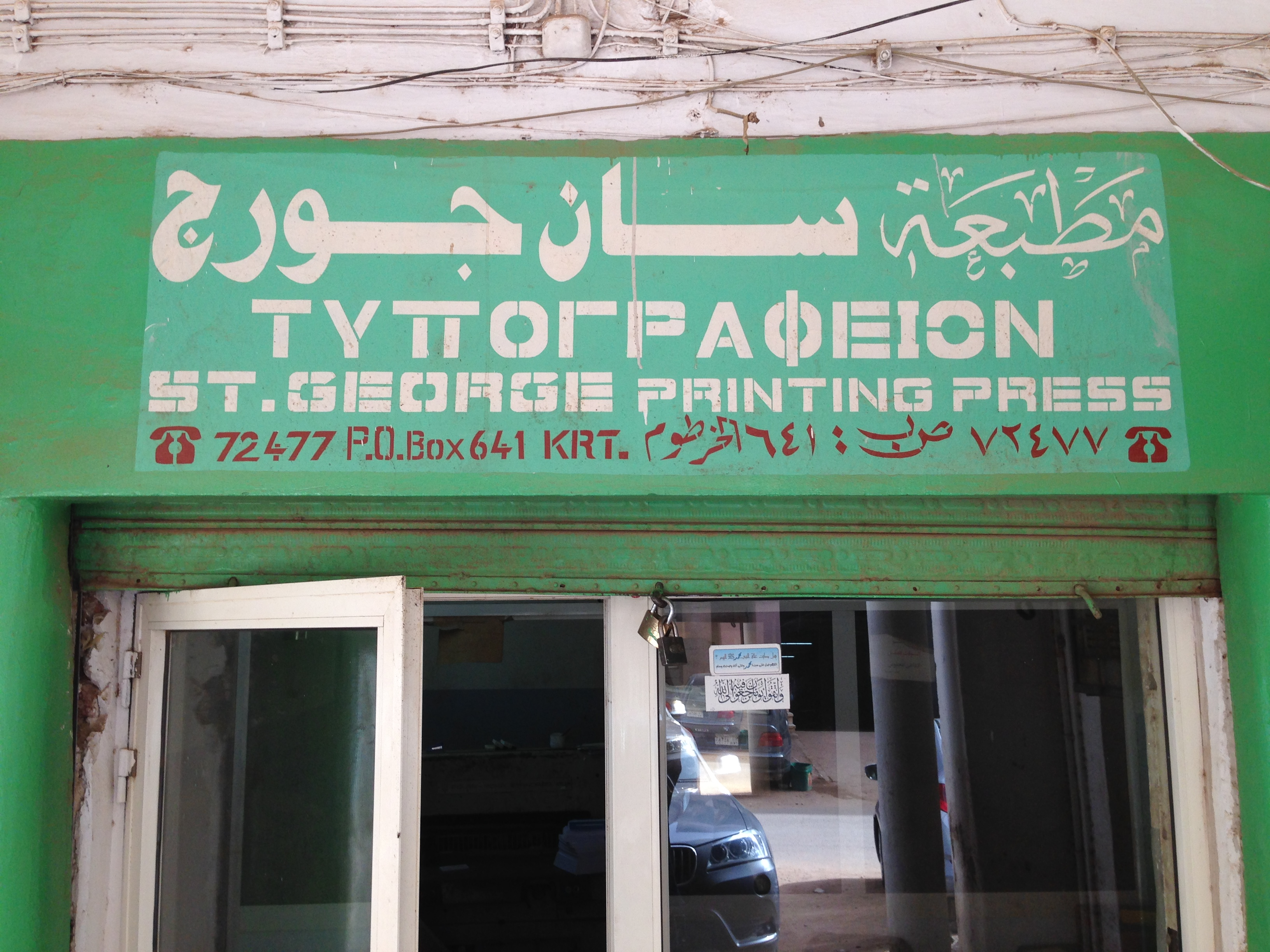
Printing press Typographeion in Zubeir Pasha Street (2018), until the 1970s run by three Greek sisters

Shortly afterwards, four Greek merchants were taken to court for charges of having collected donations for the insurgents, but got acquitted. At the end of 1964, two Greek traders in Bahr El-Ghazal and Equatoria respectively were arrested on charges of acting as a link between rebels and the outside world. In fact, an internal Anyanya paper claimed that "Greek merchants of Tambura helped by providing supplies" to a rebel camp in the Central African Republic.

When southern and northern Sudanese clashed in the streets of Khartoum on the "Black Sunday" of 6 December 1964, one Greek was amongst those who were killed by the mob, though it is unclear, whether he had been targeted for any political reasons.

In 1967, two grandsons of Dimitri Yaloris, a Greek formerly based in Gogrial, and his Dinka wife, were killed in Bahr El-Ghazal, after having been accused of supporting the Anyanya rebels. According to Chaledos, they were targeted by the army in a special operation, since they had indeed supplied arms to the insurgents through their enterprise.

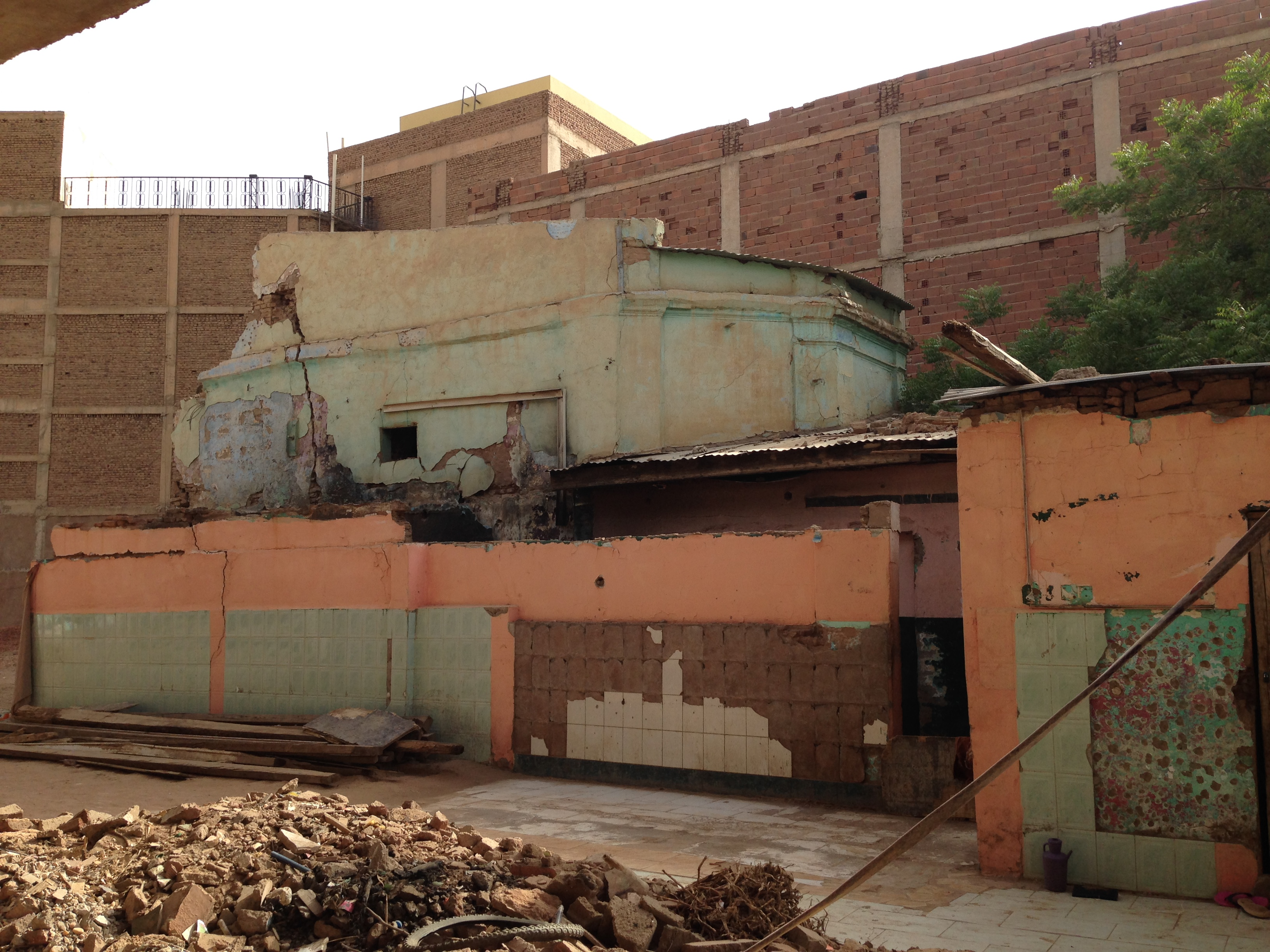
The ruins of the formerly Greek-owned St. James Music Hall in Jamhuriya Street (2018)

Moreover, the Greeks of southern Sudan, many of whom had married locals, came under pressure from both warring sides: while the accusations from Khartoum continued, southern opposition forces accused Greek monopolists of keeping the prices of animals "as low as possible to their own advantage" for export to the Middle East. Thus, the Greek community in the South further diminished, after its numbers had already decreased before 1956.

At the same time, the communities in the North started to shrink dramatically, especially outside of Khartoum, where the Greek School reached its highest level with 611 students in 1966. The reasons for the decline in the peripheries varied though: the long-established community in Wadi Halfa was dissolved already in 1964, after most of the city was flooded due to the construction of the Aswan Dam. The community of Atbara, where many Greeks had worked in the railways headquarters before independence, disbanded itself in 1968 and transferred its properties to the community of Khartoum.

===== Exodus (1969–1999) =====
The big exodus of the Greeks from northern Sudan started in 1969 after the May Revolution of the military regime under Gaafar Nimeiry, which in its early phase pursued a policy of nationalization. Big companies like Contomichalos and Tsakirolglou were hard hit and most of the disowned entrepreneurs emigrated, many of them to the Apartheid states of Rhodesia and South Africa.

By 1970, the number of Greeks had come down to around 2,000. The culture of Greek newspapers, which had been published in Sudan since 1911, ceased to exist. In 1972, the "Greek Club" was disbanded. However, some Greek industrialists, who had supported the Communist Party, were allowed to keep their factories.

In the context of this demographic decline, the once-populous Greek community in Port Sudan disbanded itself in 1974 and transferred the funds from selling its properties to the community in Khartoum. The local church of St. Mark was assigned to the Coptic Patriarchate. Likewise, the community in Wad Medani dissolved itself in 1982. By that time, the number of Greeks had further shrunk to about 1,800.

Another hard hit for the Greek community was the introduction of the draconian "September Laws" as an interpretation of Sharia by Nimeiry in 1983, who ordered all alcoholic beverages in Khartoum spectacularly dumped into the Blue Nile overnight. Until this prohibition, the trade in such goods as well as ownership of nightclubs and bars had traditionally been dominated by Greek merchants, who controlled around 80% of the market. Most prominently, the John G. Cutsuridis company had been the exclusive distributor of Camel beer produced by the Blue Nile Brewery.

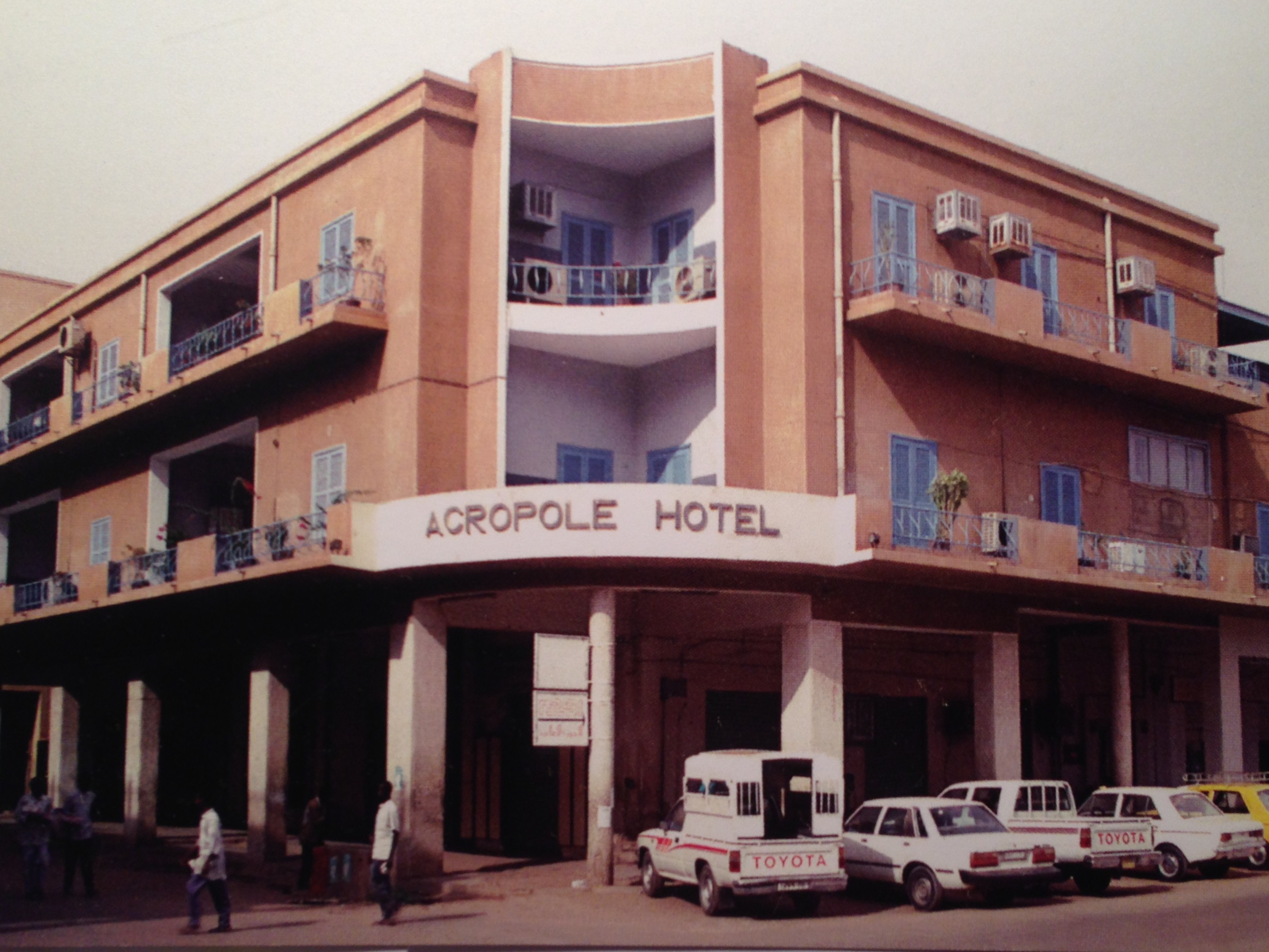
The Acropole Hotel in 2015

Since then, the Acropole Hotel in Khartoum has all the more become one of the most prominent places of Greek presence in Sudan. It was founded in 1952 by Panagiotis Pagoulatos from Cephalonia, who had left war-torn Greece in 1944, and his wife Flora, an Egyptian-Greek from Alexandria. The Washington Post wrote: "During the day, he was employed by the British government. After hours, he worked as a private accountant, soon amassing enough capital to open a night club just opposite the governor's palace." When the governor had it closed because of the noise, the couple took over a liquor dealership, opened a wine store, a confectionery shop, and then the Acropole Hotel, that soon expanded. The three sons took over the hotel, when Panagiotis died in 1967: "With their mother's guidance and their hard work, they managed to turn the hotel into an actual treasure of the city's cultural and touristic life."

Following the devastating 1984/85 famines in Darfur and Ethiopia, the Acropole became the base for many international non-governmental organizations, since it was the only hotel with reliable telephone, telex and fax lines. A framed letter from the Band Aid founder Bob Geldof on the wall of the hotel's office gives evidence of his appreciation ("Love + Thanks") for the support by the Pagoulatos family and their staff.

On 15 May 1988, the Acropole was shocked by tragedy, when a terrorist commando of the Abu Nidal group bombed the restaurant, killing a British couple with their two children, another Briton, and two Sudanese workers, and leaving many injured behind. Yet, the Pagoulatos brothers managed to restore the hotel in a building just opposite the ruins of the old one. It has remained since then one of the most popular places for Western visitors, particularly journalists, archaeologists, and staff of NGO and international organisations.

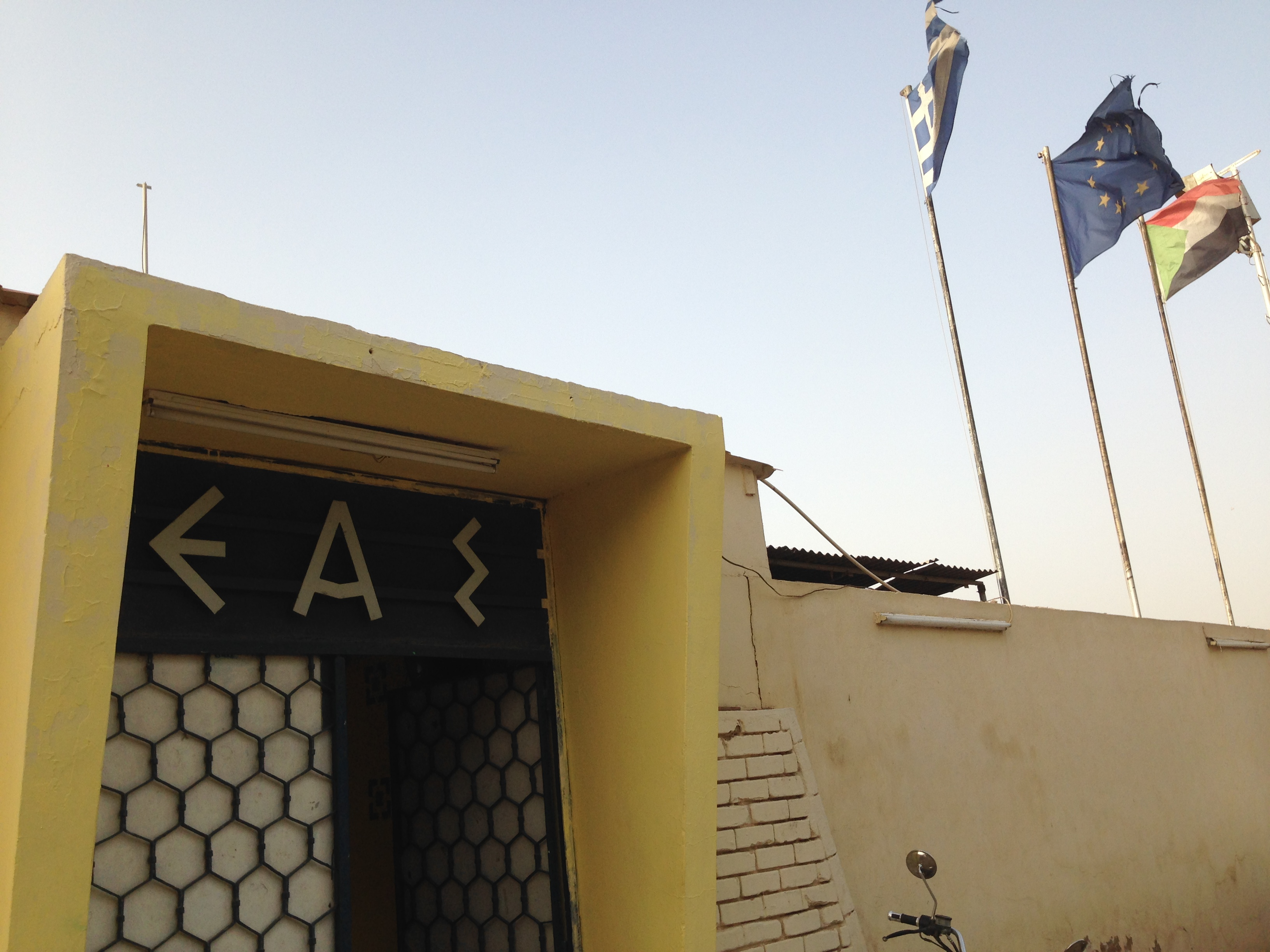
The Hellenic Athletics Club in 2018

By the end of the 1980s, the number of Greeks in Sudan had shrunk to less than 1,000. Following the 1989 coup d'état of General Omar al-Bashir, who was backed by Islamist forces under Hassan Al Turabi, and due to the long-term crisis of the economy, the number dropped to around 500 in 1992 and to about 300 in 1996. While in 1995, there were still 29 students in the Greek high school of Khartoum, it was down to just 11 in 2000. Most of the emigrants settled in Greece, after having obtained Greek nationality.

In 1994, the estates of the dissolved Greek community in Juba were taken over by the community of Khartoum, which leased the club and the Greek Orthodox church to the Catholic archdiocese.

Two years later, the facilities of the Apollo Club were nationalized by the regime. Yet, there were still ten Greek-owned small and medium-sized factories in Khartoum at that time that continued operating.

===== Transformation (since 2000) =====
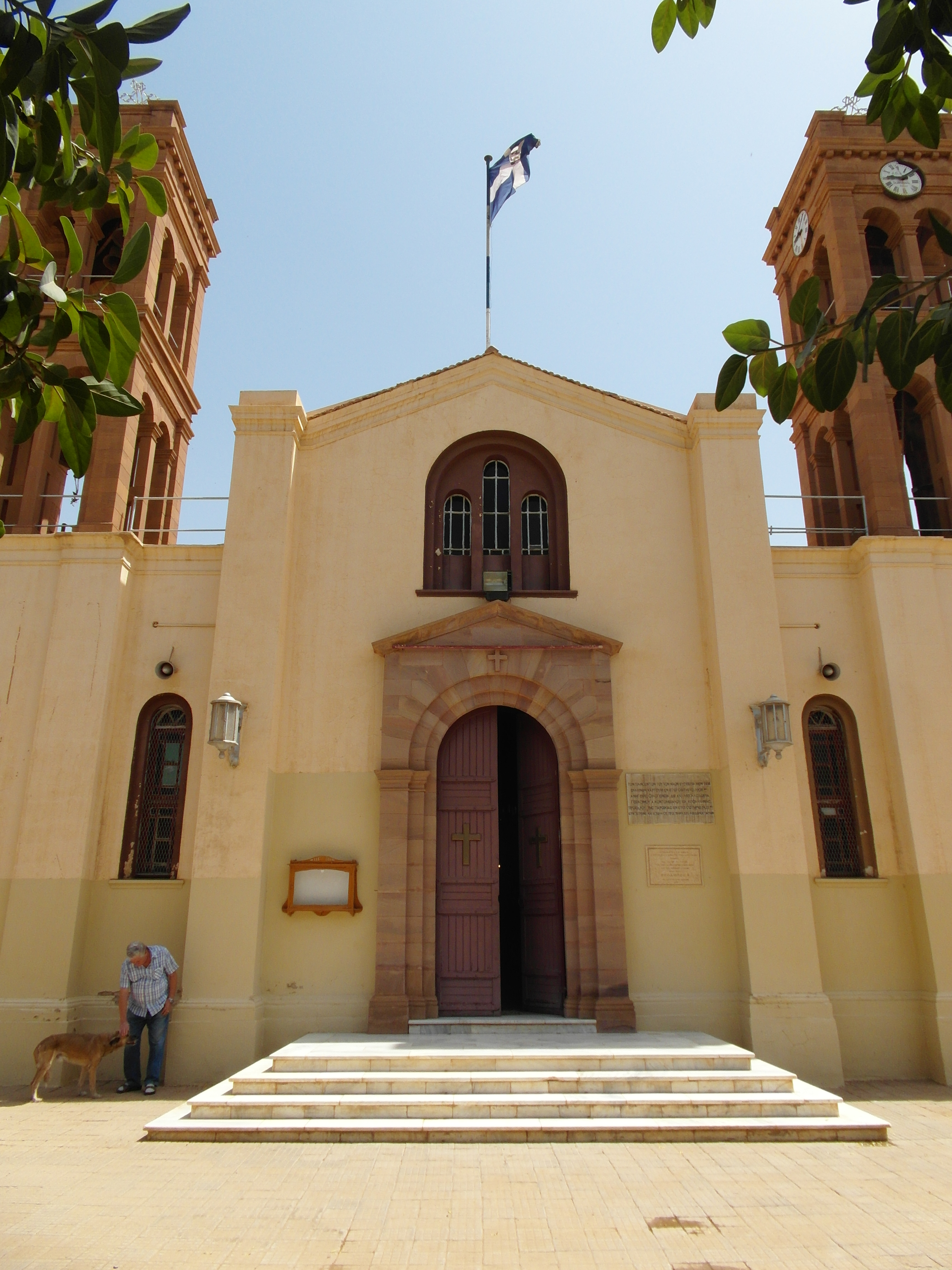
Tryfonas Kalidakis, former board member of the Hellenic Community, in front (left) of the church of the Annunciation in 2015

In July 2000, the Greek community suffered another tragedy, when the Greek Orthodox bishop of Khartoum, Titos Karantzalis, was murdered at his residence. According to Catholic sources, four Sudanese-Greek men were arrested on murder charges, but one year later acquitted. Chaldeos, however, writes that a former Vice-President of the Hellenic Community and the then President of the Hellenic Athletic Club were detained for about two months without any charges, though a British-Canadian man had been arrested and confessed to the murder.

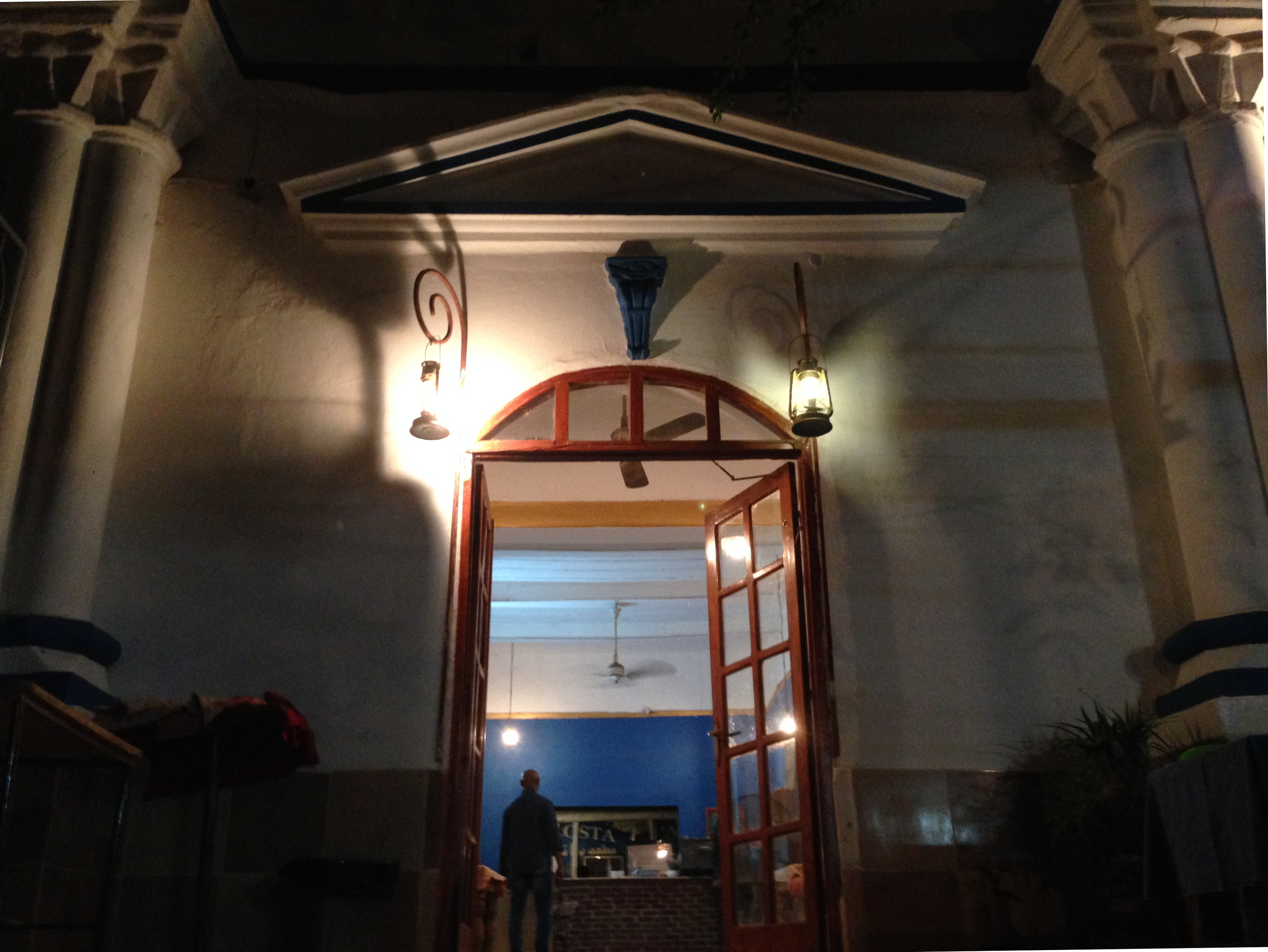
Papa Costa in 2018

With the economic boom of Sudan after the beginning of the oil production in 1999 and particularly after the 2005 Comprehensive Peace Agreement (CPA), some Sudan-born Greeks returned to the country – especially to the northern part – for employment and business activities. During that period, the Hellenic Community in Khartoum experienced another revival thanks to the establishment of the "Ergamenis" Cultural Center on its premises and the renovation of its library. These efforts were headed by the Greek-Norwegian historian, archaeologist and scholar of Nubian studies Alexandros Tsakos, who was also responsible for the only major rehabilitation of a gallery in the Sudan National Museum, i.e. the historical wall paintings in the Faras Gallery .

The CPA also offered a new start for the Greek community of southern Sudan, which was officially re-registered by the semi-autonomous government in Juba in 2006. The initiative was headed by Giorgos Ginis, whose father had been the last president of the community. In the 2000s, some 30 members are reportedly based in Juba, while about 60 live in Wau. Most of them are descendants of Greek merchants, who married southern Sudanese spouses. The community has some highly prominent members: General Gregory Vasili Dimitry, whose father Vassilis was assassinated in 1967 by the Sudanese army for his support of the Anyanya rebels (see above), was appointed as the commissioner of Gogrial East in 2005. He had already in 1984 joined the rebel Sudan People's Liberation Army (SPLA), and his sister Mary Ayen, is the wife of President Salva Kiir and First Lady of South Sudan.

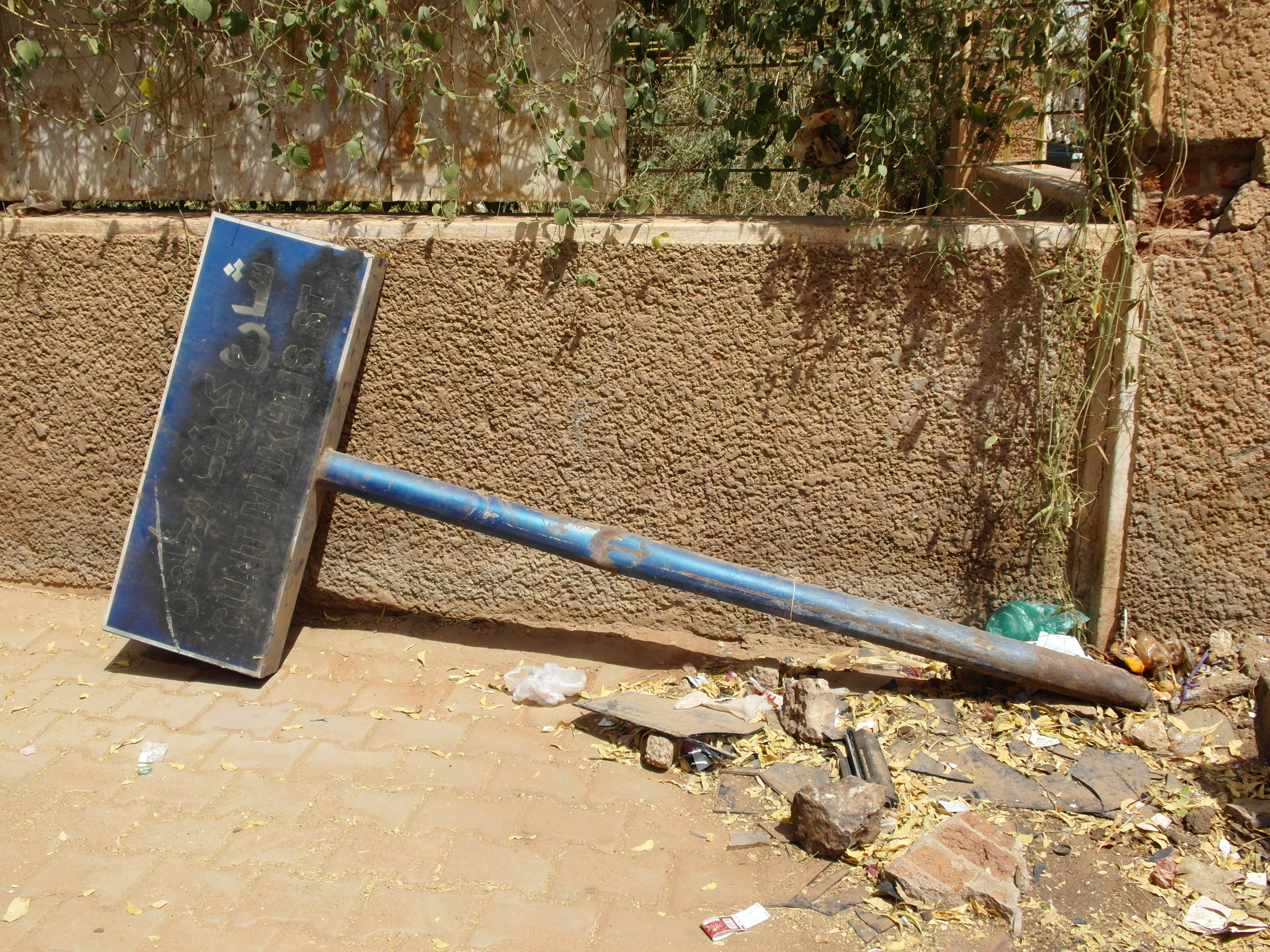
Sign of Contomichalos Street in Khartoum, name misspelled as "Cunt Mukhlis" (2015)

In 2010, the arguably internationally most prominent Greek from Sudan died: actor and theatre director Andréas Voutsinas, who is best known for his roles in Mel Brooks and Luc Besson films, as well as for his coaching of Jane Fonda. Voutsinas was born in Khartoum around 1931 to parents from Kefalonia, who set up a spaghetti factory, "reputedly supplying spaghetti to Italian forces" during the Fascist invasion of Abyssinia. After the collapse of the business during WW II, Voutsinas moved with his mother to Athens.

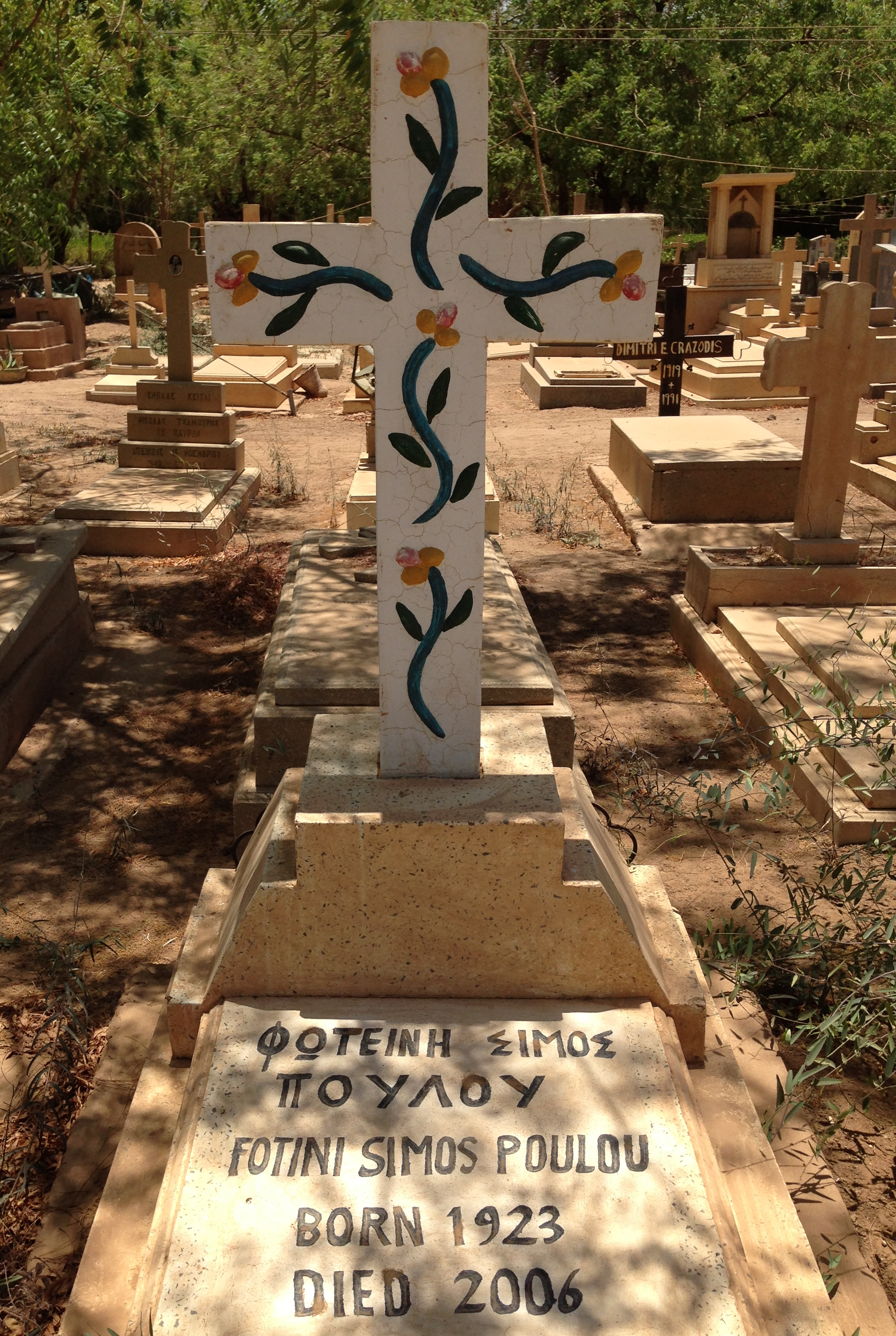
The grave of Photini Poulou-Maistrelli (1923-2006) at the Christian cemetery of Khartoum.

While the trend of re-immigration by Sudan-born Greeks reversed again after the 2011 secession of South Sudan – which also meant the separation of the Greeks in South Sudan from the Hellenic Community in Khartoum – and the subsequent plunge of the Sudanese economy, Greece's financial crisis did continue to motivate some to return and/or stay in Sudan. New membership of the Greek community though has particularly come from an increase in intermarriage: whereas reportedly up to 90% of Greeks in what was then southern Sudan married locals, such relationships used to be rare in the former northern part of the country.

In the new millennium, however, many such family bonds have grown, especially between Sudanese Copts who went to study in Greece and returned with Greek spouses. Thus, the number of Greeks in Sudan stabilised by 2015 at around 150 – which amounts to the same level of the Hellenic Community at its foundation in 1902.

However, Tsakos concludes that the relationship between the "class" of "pure" Greeks and those, "who sarcastically call themselves bazramit – "the half-castes", has historically not just been "fruitful", but also "difficult". He illustrates this through a biographical portray of Photini Poulou-Maistrelli's life as a "paradigm" for the latter. Poulou was born in the southern Sudanese town of Aweil to a Greek father and a Kresh mother from Raja in 1923. She spent most of her life in Wau and married a Greek merchant, but got into ever-growing feuds both with other Bazramit and the community in Khartoum: for her and the descendants of other intermarriages "the main issue is to be recognized as Greek."

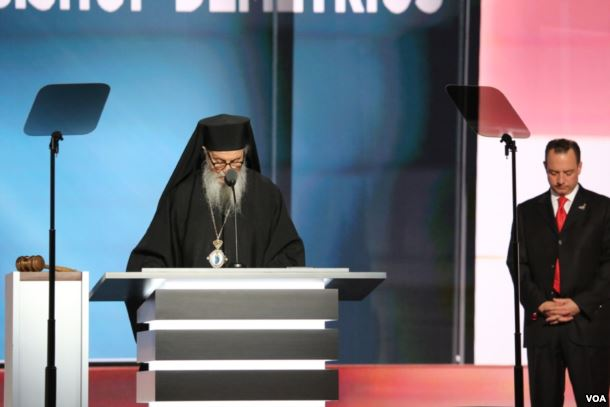
Priebus (right) and Archbishop Demetrios of the Greek Orthodox Archdiocese of America at the 2016 Republican National Convention.

Ironically in August 2015, the enforcement by the European Union of austerity packages in Greece led to the closure of the Greek School in Khartoum. Its premises were then taken over by the newly established Confluence International School. Only one month later, the embassy of the Hellenic Republic was closed – almost one and a half centuries after it was founded. Greece's new diplomatic representative as Honorary Consul became Gerasimos Pagoulatos, with the Honorary Consulate based at the Acropole Hotel.

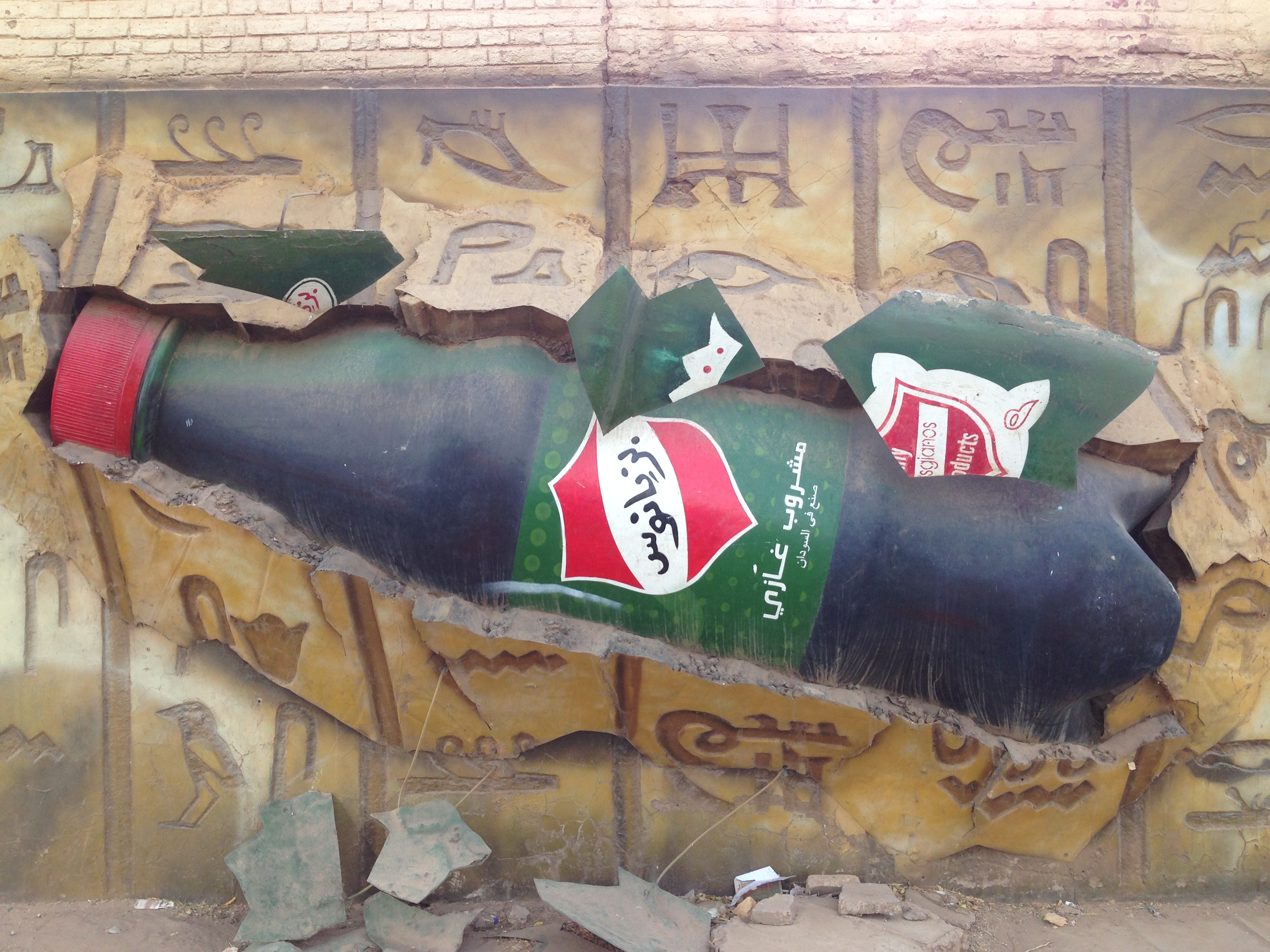
Pasgianos advertisement on the wall of the Hellenic Athletics Club

With the election of Donald Trump as US-President in November 2016 and the naming of Reince Priebus as his first Chief of Staff, the Greeks of Sudan briefly hit international news as well: Priebus' mother Dimitra – née Pitsiladis – was born in Sudan. She met his father, who is of German-English descent, in Khartoum when he served in the US Army on a mission in Ethiopia. When Trump issued a travel ban just one week after his inauguration in January 2017, global press outlets accused Priebus of hypocrisy, since his own mother's country of birth was included in the list.

Greek presence and inspiration is still visible in other Sudanese places, apart from the Acropole, Abu Ruf, Contomichalos and Katarina Streets, the Hellenic compound in Khartoum, the Mediterranean architecture of Greek buildings in the capital, and Kosti. Two of them are restaurants close to the Acropole: Greek Pitta, run by a Greek couple, and Papa Costa restaurant, founded in the 1950s by a Greek immigrant and named after him. After the 2005 CPA, it sparked a kind of "Old Khartoum" revival by regularly staging live music. Two important scenes of the drama film "Goodbye Julia", which was released in May 2023 at the Cannes Film Festival, were shot at Papa Costa.

In the neighbourhood of Khartoum Two, the Hellenic Athletic Club still operates, and is popular with Western expats and commonly known as the Greek Club. Its basketball team has continued to participate in the Sudanese championship. Alexandra Pateraki is the president of both the Hellenic Community and the Hellenic Athletic Club.

The most present Greek legacy in Sudanese culture, however, is "the classic childhood drink" of Pasgianos, an ultra-sweet carbonated soft drink that is only available in Sudan. The unique flavour was invented by George Dimitri Pasgianos, who immigrated around 1930 and merged Greek and Sudanese tastes in the recipe of the fizzy drink. Throughout the decades, it proved resilient against global competitors of soft drinks in the countrywide market and was sold in 1999 by its Greek-Sudanese owners to the Haggar Holding Company, one of the biggest trading corporations of Sudan. Leila Aboulela, the award-winning doyenne of Sudanese literature, whose father's trading company was based in the Greek-designed landmark Aboulela Building (see above), has immortalised Pasgianos in her 2015 novel The Kindness of Enemies:

«The bottle was warm and I drank it all in one go.»

===== Another exodus (since 2023) =====
When an armed conflict between rival factions of the military government of Sudan began on 15 April 2023, there were reportedly 150 Greeks in Sudan. Two of them were injured by a rocket as they left the church of the Annunciation in Khartoum where the Orthodox Easter was being celebrated. The Orthodox Metropolitan of Nubia and all of Sudan, Bishop Savvas Cheimonettos, and 15 others - Greeks, Ethiopians, Sudanese and Russians, amongst them three small children - remained locked inside the church building for days. According to media reports referring to diplomats in Athens, the United Arab Emirates, which is the main backer of the paramilitary Rapid Support Forces (RSF), and Egypt, which supports the Sudanese Armed Forces (SAF), helped to temporarily stop attacks around the church of the Annunciation and other locations where Greeks were known to be trapped, so that they could evacuate to the Wadi Seidna Air Base. Bishop Savvas later added that a senior Muslim cleric had played a key role.

Like the Greek compound, the nearby Acropole Hotel was at the epicentre of heavy fighting between SAF and RSF for the control over the political centre of Sudan in downtown Khartoum. Two members of the Pagoulatos-family, who has owned the business since 1952, were holed up in the hotel building with four guests and three staff for ten days, until they managed to escape for evacuation by the French Armed Forces. Thus, the Acropole closed its doors for the first time in 71 years. While some press reports called it the end of an era, the then 79-year-old director Thanasis Pagoulatos in a Reuters interview expressed firm hope for a return.

On April 25, a C-27 cargo plane of the Hellenic Air Force (HAF) evacuated 17 people from Djibouti via Aswan to Greece. This first group consisted of 13 Greeks and 4 non-Greek spouses of Greek nationals, including three children. One of the Greeks was injured and needed leg surgery. The second wounded Greek, who was in a more serious condition and received surgery in a French military hospital, was to be repatriated in a special plane for air medical services. On April 27, a C-130 Hercules HAF transport plane arrived in Athens carrying 20 Greeks and 19 foreign nationals from Sudan.

== Gallery: The Greek section of the Christian cemetery in Khartoum (2018) ==
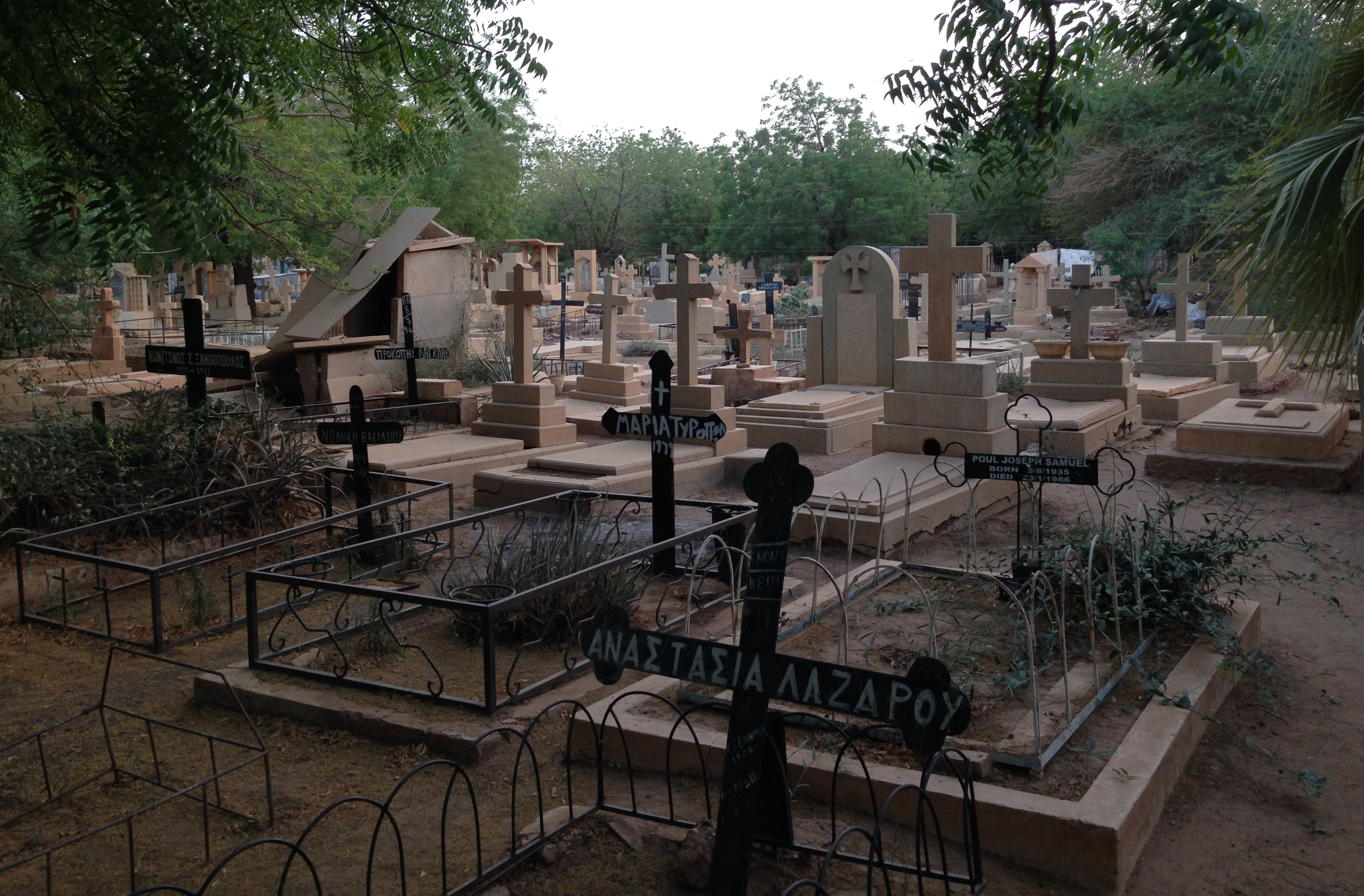
Overview

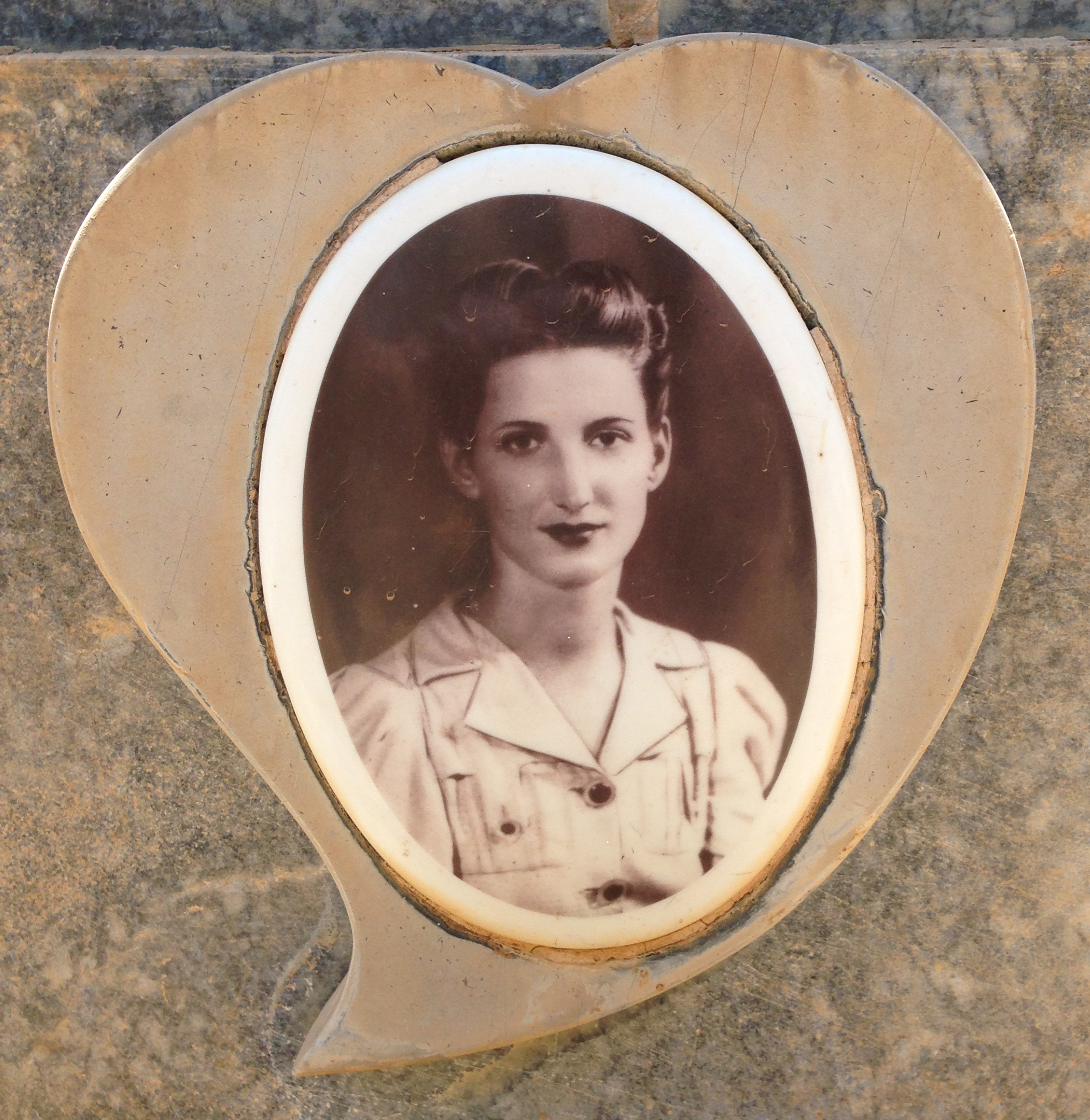
ΣΟUΓΑ ΡΕΒΙΝΘΗ, who died on 23 July 1945 aged 22

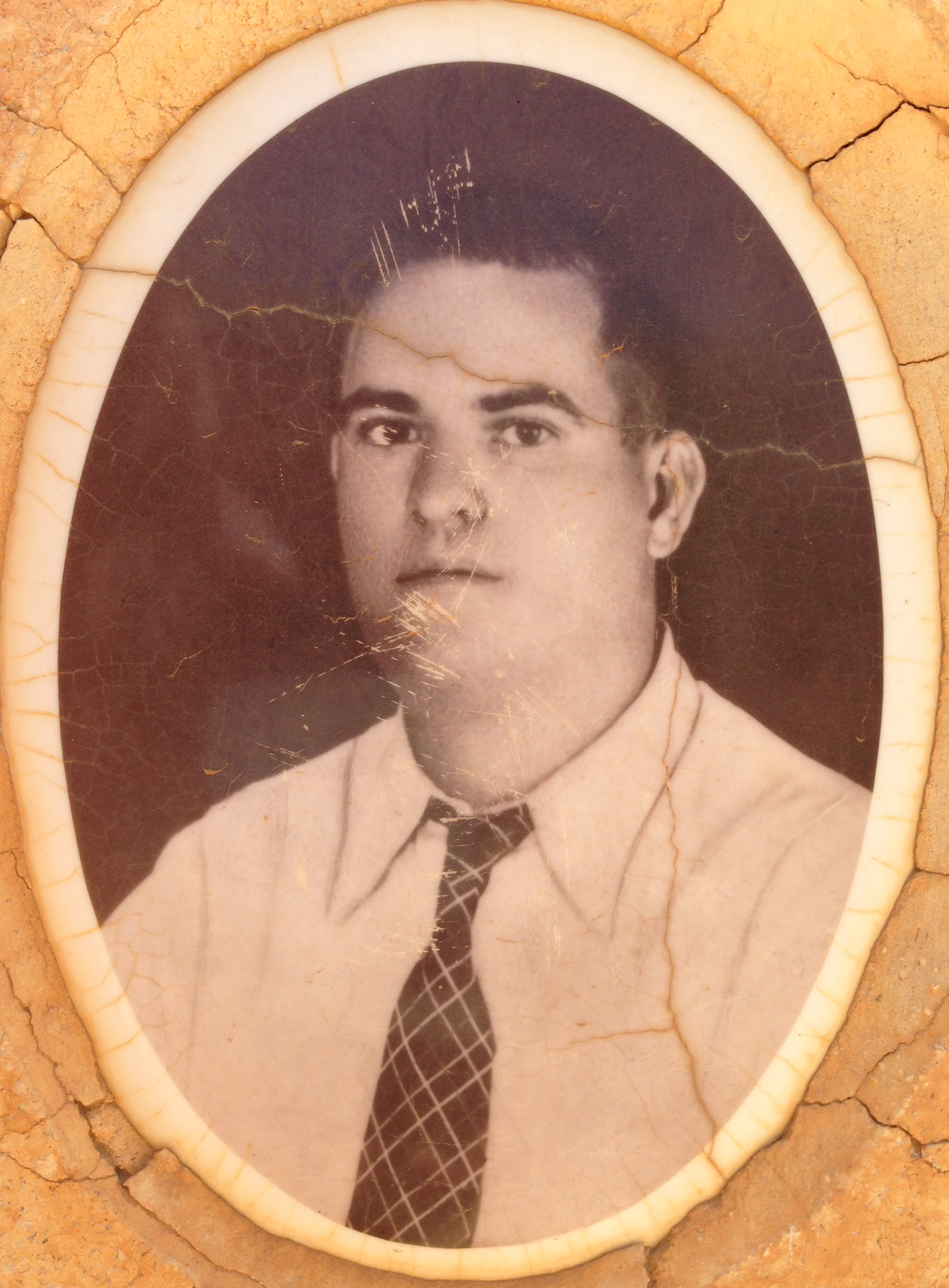
ΔΙΜΗΤΡΙΟΣ ΧΡΑΜΠΑΝΗ, who was born in 1919 and died at the age of 26

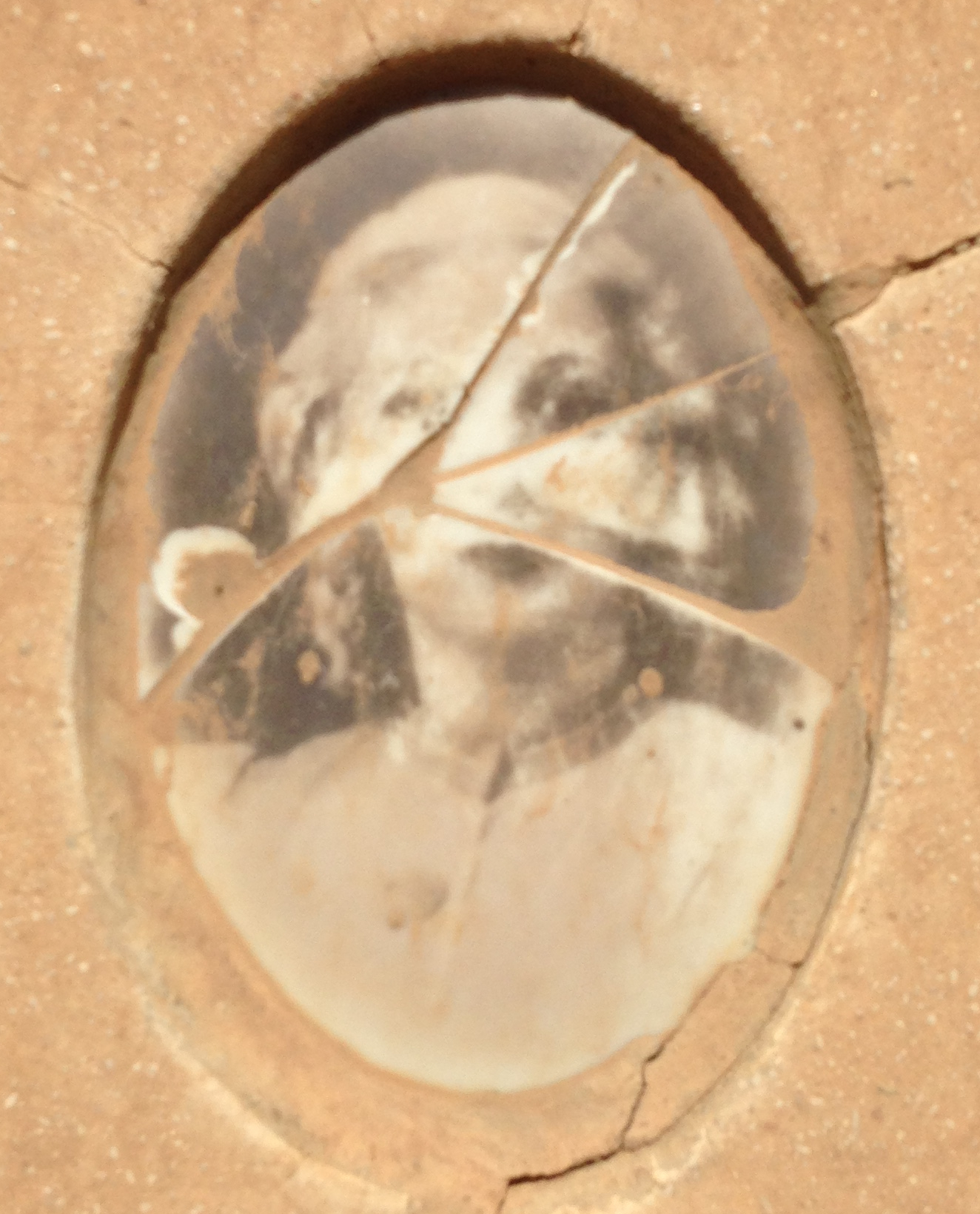
ΣΟΦΙΑ ΒΟΓΙΑΖΙΔΑΚΗ, who died in 1946 aged 48

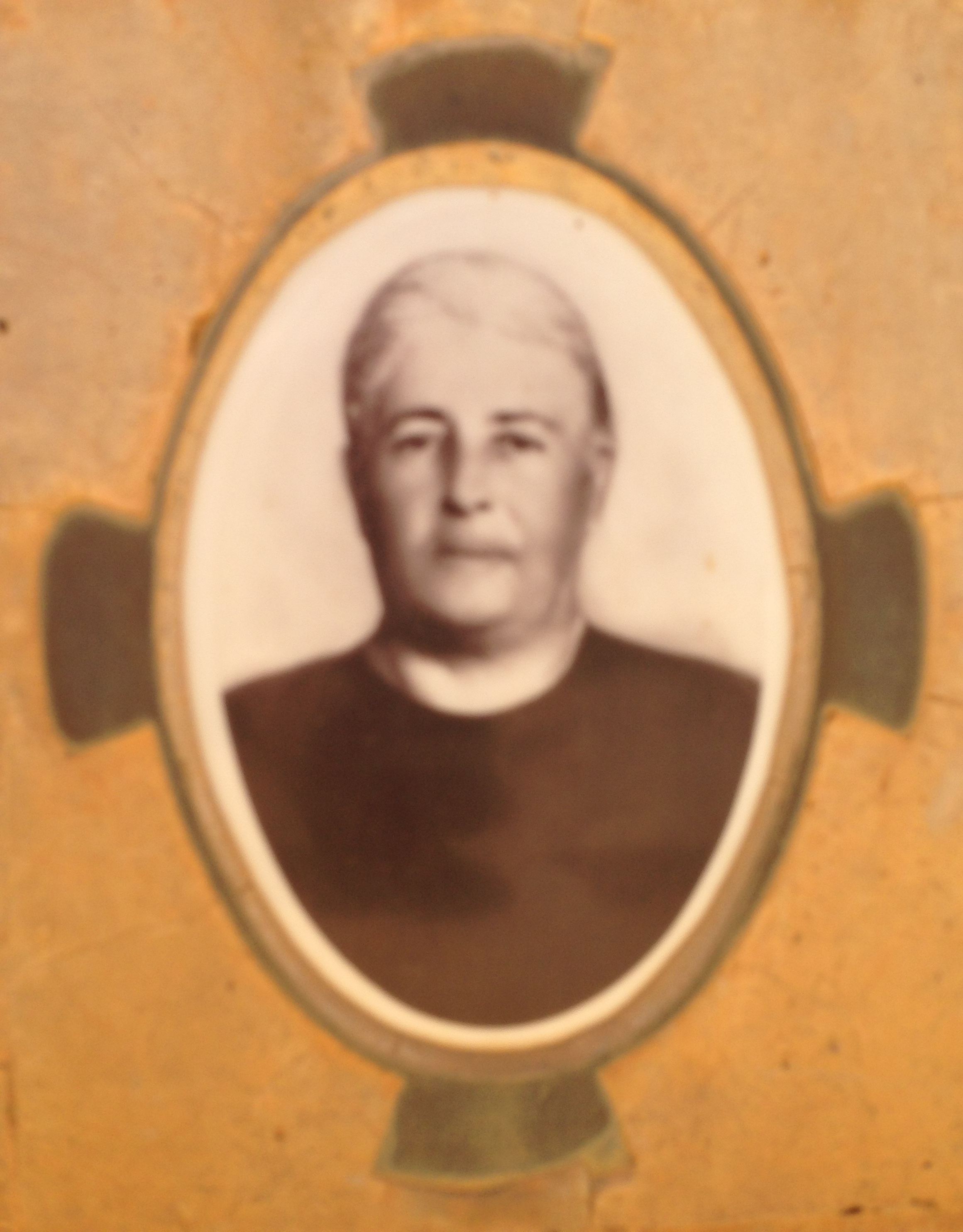
ΑΙΚΑΤΕΡΙΝΗ Α. ΚΡΥΣΤΑΛΛΙΔΟΥ (1888–1948)

== See also ==
- History of Sudan
- Reince Priebus, mother is of Greek-Sudanese descent
