= 2023 in British television =

This is a list of events that took place in 2023 relating to television in the United Kingdom.

== Events ==
=== January ===
Date	Event
1	BBC One's New Year schedule includes Sam Ryder Rocks New Year's Eve from 11.30pm on 31 December 2022, with a break at midnight for London's annual New Year fireworks display. Het Grote Songfestivalfeest (renamed The Big Eurovision Party for UK viewers) follows Sam Ryder at 12.45am and is presented by Rylan Clark.
1	BBC Four begins showing old editions of Come Dancing, beginning with an edition from 1979 presented by Terry Wogan. Seven editions of the show are planned for repeat on a weekly basis.
1	ITV airs No Time to Die as part of its New Year's Day schedule.
2	The BBC News channel airs the final edition of The Papers, its nightly review of the following morning's newspaper headlines. From the following day, discussion of newspaper headlines will form part of its news content.
3	School drama Waterloo Road returns to BBC One following an eight-year hiatus.
4	Culture Secretary Michelle Donelan has written to the Prime Minister recommending the government reverse its plans to privatise Channel 4. The recommendation is criticised by her predecessor, Nadine Dorries, who describes it as one of a number of "progressive" policies that are being "washed down the drain".
5	The UK government confirms it will not go ahead with a plan to privatise Channel 4.
5	BBC World News broadcasts coverage of the funeral of Pope Benedict XVI.
5	The Apprentice returns for Series 17, with a new receptionist, Khadeejah Khan, who is the first to wear a hijab.
7	The ITC Entertainment series The Four Just Men makes its Talking Pictures TV debut.
7	Ahead of the merger in April, the BBC News Channel stops producing its weekend opt-out from BBC World News between 13:00–19:00. All network bulletins expect Breakfast and Sunday with Laura Kuenssberg stop being simulcast on the channel.
8	ITV and ITVX air Harry: The Interview, a 95-minute programme in which Prince Harry talks to Tom Bradby ahead of the release of his autobiography, Spare, on 10 January. According to Deadline, the programme is watched by an average audience of 4.1 million, peaking at 4.5 million, but is beaten in the ratings by Episode 2 of the third series of Happy Valley on BBC One, which draws an audience of 5.2 million.
9	Talking Pictures TV begins re-running the 1970s ITV drama Crown Court on Mondays, Thursdays and Fridays at 2.30pm. Unusually for a series from the era, all of its 879 episodes still exist.
9	GB News have hired comedian Daniel O'Reilly as a commentator on their late night newspaper review show, Headliners.
9	Amanda Lovett, a contestant on BBC One's The Traitors apologises on social media after drawing criticism for making an appearance on GB News the previous week, and posing for photographs with fellow contestant Kieran Thompsett alongside presenters Tatiana Sanchez and Calvin Robinson (who has faced criticism for his views on LGBTQ issues). Lovett blames her agent for arranging her appearance on the channel, saying that she "had no idea what the news channel was about".
12	The nominees are announced for the 2023 Brit Awards. There are no female nominations in the British Artist of the Year category for the first time, and British singer Sam Ryder, is the first Eurovision artist to be nominated for Best New Artist and K-pop girl group Blackpink is the first Kpop girl group to be nominated for International Group. The ceremony was hosted by Mo Gilligan for the second year running, and aired on ITV on 11 February.
13	The US version of The Traitors is made available as a box set on BBC iPlayer.
13	Former GB News presenter Mercy Muroki has been hired by the UK government to advise Kemi Badenoch, the Minister for Women and Equalities, on gender policy.
13	The BBC's F1 correspondent and co-commentator for the English language world feed of Extreme E Jennie Gow, announces on social media that she had suffered a stroke, affecting her speech and ability to write.
15	Ski Sunday celebrates its 45th anniversary.
16	The critically acclaimed TV adaptation of the video game, The Last of Us, makes its UK television debut on Sky Atlantic, airing at 2.00am.
16	The BBC have partnered with the European Broadcasting Union and Warner Bros. Discovery to provide coverage of the Olympic Games, with every Games up to and including 2032 free-to-air across the BBC.
16	Love Island returns to ITV2 for a ninth series with a change of rules regarding contestants' social media accounts, which ITV now requests remain dormant during the series. Contestants' friends and relatives had previously managed their social media accounts while they participated in the series.
16	Birmingham City Council have approved BBC plans to use the old Banana Warehouse in Digbeth as the new MasterChef studios.
17	BBC Breakfast celebrates its 40th anniversary of Breakfast Time with guest appearances from some former presenters, including Francis Wilson, Russell Grant and Debbie Rix.
17	The BBC apologises to viewers after sexual noises were heard during coverage of an FA Cup third-round replay.
17	Amazon Prime Video has reportedly cut ties with Jeremy Clarkson following his controversial remarks about Meghan Markle.
17	GB News Head of Television, Helen Warner, leaves her post after four months with the channel.
18	Piers Morgan attracts criticism on social media after comments made on his show, Piers Morgan Uncensored, about Madonna ahead of the Celebration Tour, her 40th anniversary world tour. Morgan criticised the singer for "the whole trying to be a sex kitten thing when you're in your sixties" and suggested she should be "put out to pasture".
19	BBC One airs an edition of Question Time focused entirely on the health service.
23	William Shawcross, the Commissioner for Public Appointments, is to hold a review into the process of hiring Chairman of the BBC Richard Sharp following claims he helped then Prime Minister Boris Johnson secure a loan guarantee shortly before his appointment.
23	Ofcom says it will not investigate comments about Qatar made by Gary Neville on ITV before the 2022 FIFA World Cup final. Neville had called working conditions in the country "abhorrent", attracting 705 complaints from viewers, but Ofcom have concluded the remarks were part of "a wider discussion about policies and actions of the Qatari Government, which gave due weight to a range of views".
23	Ant & Dec have signed a three-year contract extension with ITV.
24	Bruno Tonioli replaces David Walliams as a judge on Britain's Got Talent.
25	Made in Manchester announces a partnership with Workerbee to generate new content ideas for radio and television.
26	BBC newsreader Joanna Gosling makes her final appearance on the BBC News channel, having decided to leave the broadcaster after 23 years, and ahead of the planned merger of BBC News and BBC World News.
26	GB News have hired Conservative MP and former Leader of the House of Commons Jacob Rees-Mogg to present a chat show that will travel round the country.
28	Eric Pickles, chair of the Advisory Committee on Business Appointments, says that Nadine Dorries, the former Secretary of State for Culture, has breached the ministerial code by not consulting the watchdog about her appointment as a presenter on TalkTV, where she is to present a weekly show from 3 February.
30	William Shawcross, the commissioner for public appointments, steps back from the planned investigation into how Richard Sharp got the job as BBC chairman because of previous contact between them. Another investigator will be appointed to take on the inquiry.
30	Analysis carried out by market researchers Kantar Group shows the number of paid-for video streaming subscriptions in the UK fell by two million during 2022 as people made cutbacks because of the cost of living crisis, with the number falling from 30.5m to 28.5m.
31	BBC Two broadcasts the ceremony at which the "official keys of Eurovision" are handed from the previous year's host city to the present year's host city (in this case from Turin to Liverpool). The event is presented by Rylan Clark and AJ Odudu.

=== February ===
Date	Event
1	STV Player begins streaming classic soap opera Brookside as the first streaming service to provide every episode.
2	The BBC announces that Matthew Amroliwala, Christian Fraser, Yalda Hakim, Lucy Hockings, and Maryam Moshiri will be chief presenters on the BBC's news channel. However Amroliwala's Global, Hakim's Impact and Live With Lucy Hockings are not confirmed as staying on air.
2	The evening's edition of Piers Morgan Uncensored includes an interview with Prime Minister Rishi Sunak, was live at 10 Downing Street. The programme is watched by an average audience of 120,500, putting TalkTV ahead of its rivals, BBC News, Sky News, and GB News, during the 8.00–9.00pm timeslot.
3	Former Secretary of State for Culture Nadine Dorries begins presenting a weekly Friday evening show, Friday Night with Nadine, for Talkradio and TalkTV. Her first guest is the former Prime Minister Boris Johnson.
5	The final episodes of His Dark Materials and Happy Valley are shown on BBC One.
5	BBC World News America presenter Laura Trevelyan and her family apologise to the people of the Caribbean island of Grenada, where its ancestors had more than 1,000 slaves in the 19th Century. Trevelyan says that seven members of her family will travel to Grenada later in February to issue a public apology.
6	Mark Steyn, who used his GB News show to cast doubt on the safety of Coronavirus vaccines, quits the news channel after claiming its bosses tried to make him pay fines issued by the media regulator Ofcom following two investigations into his programme.
7	Lucy Frazer replaces Michelle Donelan as Culture Secretary following a cabinet reshuffle.
7	Castle Rock Entertainment announces a deal with John Cleese to revive the sitcom Fawlty Towers, with Cleese reprising his role as Basil Fawlty and his daughter Camilla also starring.
8	The BBC pulls several episodes of Doctors that depict an explosion at a medical conference, deeming they would be inappropriate for transmission after the 2023 Turkey–Syria earthquake.
8	The Board of Deputies of British Jews and the All-Party Parliamentary Group against Antisemitism have urged the media regulator Ofcom and GB News to tackle what it describes as the channel's indulgence in conspiracy theories. The comments follow the 4 February edition of Neil Oliver's programme in which he described a "silent war" by generations of politicians to take "total control of the people" by creating a "one-world government".
9	BBC Three celebrates its 20th anniversary.
9	Reece Donnelly leaves Series 17 of The Apprentice, later saying that he did so for health reasons.
10	An inquest into the death of Cherry Valentine, a contestant on the second series of RuPaul's Drag Race UK records a verdict of suicide after hearing how he had struggled to deal with fame before taking his life in September 2022.
11	The 2023 Brit Awards are broadcast live. The ceremony was shown on ITV, ITV2 and ITVX.
13	The BBC have commissioned Grenfell, a three-part series telling the story of the Grenfell Tower fire. The series will be written and directed by Peter Kosminsky.
13	Sky Kids launches and is aimed at children aged 1–7. Apart from promos, the channel doesn't carry any advertisements. It is the first in-house children's network to be programmed and directly operated by Sky as until October 2022, Sky had held a stake in Nickelodeon UK Ltd which had contained a non-compete clause that otherwise restricted Sky and Comcast from launching a children's television network.
13	The BBC Welsh Service (now BBC Cymru Wales) marks the 100th anniversary of the BBC's first broadcast in Wales.
13	S Club 7 make an appearance on The One Show, having announced plans to reunite for their 25th anniversary.
14	It is reported that former Loose Women presenter Saira Khan will join Eamonn Holmes on GB News on the Monday and Tuesday editions of The Great British Breakfast.
17	Originally scheduled for 2020, but delayed due to the Coronavirus pandemic, series seven of Still Open All Hours is completely cancelled by the BBC, with no plans for any further series.
17	Buckinghamshire Council approves proposals for an £800m expansion of Pinewood Studios near Iver Heath.
18	The Persian language TV network Iran International announces it is suspending its UK operation because of threats against its London-based journalists.
18	Bulgarian journalist Christo Grozev, who appeared in Navalny, a BAFTA-nominated film about the poisoning of Alexei Navalny, claims he has been banned from the awards ceremony because he is a security risk.
19	The 2023 BAFTA Film Awards are held at London's Southbank Centre.
20	Channel 5 presenter Dan Walker is taken to hospital after being struck by a car while riding his bike.
21	Warner Bros. Discovery EMEA announces that BT Sport will rebrand as TNT Sports in July 2023, ahead of the 2023–24 football season; the branding is derived from WBD's U.S. television channel TNT (which has historically carried sports coverage such as the NBA), and has also been used by WarnerMedia sports networks in Latin America. The Eurosport UK channels will be folded into TNT Sports at a later date, expected to be no sooner than the 2024 Summer Olympics, but no later than the 2026 Winter Olympics.
21	Ofcom have written to both ITV News and Sky News to ask them for an explanation of their actions following complaints made by the family of Nicola Bulley, who disappeared while walking her dog, and whose body was later found by police. Bulley's family had been contacted by both outlets despite asking for privacy.
21	ITV confirms that You've Been Framed will not be returning for another series and the comedy clip show has been axed after 33 years on air.
21	The Telegraph journalist Christopher Hope announces he is joining GB News as head of politics and political editor later in the year.
22	The presenting line up for the 2023 Eurovision Song Contest is revealed. Hannah Waddingham, star of Ted Lasso, will co-present alongside singer Alesha Dixon and Ukrainian singer Julia Sanina, with Graham Norton joining them to present the grand final.
24	The UK Government is to give £10m to the Eurovision Song Contest to help pay for operational costs such as security and visas, as well as ensuring the event "showcases Ukrainian culture".
24	A voiced aid appeal for victims of the 2023 Turkey–Syria earthquake narrated by Daniel Craig airs simultaneously on across 29 UK channels.
27	Stephen Fry confirms he will present a revival of Jeopardy! on ITV.

=== March ===
Date	Event
1	More details of the 2023 Eurovision Song Contest are released. The run up to the event will include a submarine parade through the streets of Liverpool, as well as a rave held simultaneously in Liverpool and Kyiv.
1	TalkTV launches a livestream on Amazon Freevee.
2	Plans are announced for BBC Breakfast to relaunch the 500 Words children's writing competition previously run by Radio 2. The competition will return in September.
3	Reality television star Stephen Bear is sentenced to 21 months imprisonment for sharing a video of himself having sex with an ex-partner on the OnlyFans website.
5	BBC One airs an edition of Antiques Roadshow featuring Queen Camilla, which was filmed at Cornwall's Eden Project in 2022, and sees Camilla have two of her own personal items valued, a rare snuffbox from the Royal Collection made from Cornish silver and a copy of Thomas Gray's poem, Elegy in a Country Churchyard.
5	It is announced that Arlene Foster will expand her role at GB News, taking on further presenting duties alongside making documentaries for the channel. Her first documentary, looking at the role of faith in politics, will air later in the year.
6	Media regulator Ofcom finds that the GB News programme Mark Steyn, which aired on 21 April 2022, was in breach of broadcasting rules, as it presented misinformation on Coronavirus and vaccines.
6	World Business Report begins to be shown on the BBC News Channel as part of extended programme sharing between the channel and BBC World News.
6	GB News confirms it will air coverage of the Twelfth of July parade from Belfast for the second year running. Foster will again present coverage of the parade.
6	Falkirk wheelchair racer Abby Cook will be the new presenter as the 42nd on the long-running children's show Blue Peter.
7	Tickets for the Eurovision Song Contest go on sale, and sell out in 90 minutes due to high demand.
7	As part of budget cuts the BBC announces plans to scrap the BBC Singers, the UK's only full-time professional chamber choir, later in the year.
7	STV hosts the first televised debate of the 2023 Scottish National Party leadership election.
7	GB News announces that Conservative MP Lee Anderson is to host a show on the channel.
8	BBC sports presenter Gary Lineker has said he will continue to speak up for those who have "no voice" following criticism from the Home Secretary over a series of tweets posted the previous day on the UK government's Illegal Migration Bill, the language of which he described as "not dissimilar to that used by Germany in the 30s".
9	Mae Muller is chosen to represent the UK at the 2023 Eurovision Song Contest with her song "I Wrote a Song".
9	GB News reports a loss of £30m for its first year on air, from June 2021 to June 2022. It also had a turnover of £3.6m over the same period.
10	The BBC confirms Gary Lineker is to step back as presenter of Match of the Day until an agreement can be reached over his social media use. Ian Wright and Alan Shearer subsequently announce they will not appear on the show either, in solidarity with Lineker. After other presenters, including Jermaine Jenas, refuse to act as stand-in presenter, the BBC announces the following day's edition of Match of the Day will go ahead without in-studio presenters or pundits.
10	ITV plc announces that their children's channel, CITV, will close in Autumn 2023 and be replaced by "ITVX Kids", a new dedicated destination for kids on ITVX to launch in July. The LittleBe pre-school segment on ITVBe will continue, while some children's content will air on ITV2 in the early mornings from September.
11	BBC One axes the day's editions of Football Focus and Final Score after their respective presenters, Alex Scott and Jason Mohammad, say they will not appear on the programmes in solidarity with Gary Lineker. Kelly Somers, who was rumoured to be standing in for Scott on Football Focus, also confirms she will not appear on BBC television. 5 Live Sport and Fighting Talk are also pulled from the day's schedule on BBC Radio 5 Live after their presenters say they will not be going on air. Match of the Day goes ahead, but as a 20 minute programme without its familiar theme music. GB News airs what it describes as an Alternative Match of the Day which includes its presenters making a number of digs at Lineker but does not show any actual football coverage, something for which it is widely mocked on social media, with comparisons drawn to The Day Today. Both Match of the Day and Match of the Day 2, broadcast the following day, follow a shortened format with no studio presentation, punditry, or interviews.
12	Endeavour aired its final episode titled Exeunt on ITV after nine series.
13	Gary Lineker is reinstated as presenter of Match of the Day and will present again from Saturday 18 March. BBC Director-General Tim Davie also announces a review of social media policy for BBC presenters is to be carried out.
13	BBC Question Time presenter Fiona Bruce announces she will relinquish her role as an ambassador for domestic violence charity Refuge following comments made on the 9 March edition of Question Time which led to her being accused of "minimising" and trivialising abuse. Bruce faced the allegations after intervening in a debate during which Stanley Johnson was described by one panellist as a "wife-beater". Bruce says her intervention was "mischaracterised" by a "social media storm".
14	BBC Scotland hosts the final televised debate of the SNP leadership election.
15	Lucy Illingworth is named as the winner of the first series of Channel 4's The Piano.
17	Alison Hammond confirms she will replace Matt Lucas as co-presenter of The Great British Bake Off.
17	BBC One airs Red Nose Day 2023, with the evening raising a total of £34m for Comic Relief.
18	Gary Lineker returns to BBC One as he presents the channel's live coverage of the FA Cup match between Manchester City and Burnley. But he is forced to cancel his appearance on the following day's coverage of the quarter-final between Brighton & Hove and Grimsby Town after losing his voice. Coverage of that match is instead presented by Alex Scott.
19	The BBC urges its staff to delete the TikTok app from its official devices amid concerns about its security.
22	Sky Sports announces plans to axe Soccer AM after 28 years, with the final edition planned for Saturday 27 May.
22	Newsreader Alastair Stewart announces his retirement after 50 years in broadcasting.
22	Ofcom has received 2,250 complaints about Channel 5's Jeremy Vine programme following a debate about strikes by junior doctors on the 13 March edition of the show. Ofcom says it is deciding whether to launch an investigation.
23	The BBC confirms it has halted production on Series 34 of Top Gear after presenter Freddie Flintoff was injured in an accident while filming in December 2022.
23	Marnie Swindells wins Series 17 of The Apprentice.
23	Channel 4 confirms its game show Moneybags will not be renewed for a third series.
23	GB News announce plans to expand their political coverage and establish a new studio at Westminster. It is also reported that Conservative Party Deputy Chairman Lee Anderson will be paid £100,000 a year in his new presenting role with the channel.
24	The BBC pauses its decision to scrap the BBC Singers while it explores alternative funding for the chamber choir, and after a number of organisations came forward to offer funding.
25	BBC Two airs The MI5 Spy and the IRA: Operation Chiffon, a programme in which journalist Peter Taylor reveals the story of an MI5 spy who helped bring about the Northern Ireland Peace Process after defying government orders not to hold talks with Provisional IRA representatives in 1993.
27	ITV announces the return of Deal or No Deal, with new presenter Stephen Mulhern.
29	Vicki Michelle makes her EastEnders debut as Jo Cotton.
29	Ofcom have received 52 complaints about the 24 March edition of TalkTV's Friday Night with Nadine Dorries after its presenter commented on the ongoing Commons Privileges Committee investigation into former Prime Minister Boris Johnson.
30	The BBC confirms it will broadcast 1,000 fewer hours of new television programmes during 2023 as part of spending cuts.
30	BBC soap opera Doctors airs the final appearance of mainstay Karen Hollins (Jan Pearson) after fourteen years in an announced shock death storyline.
30	ITV airs Jason & Clara: In Memory of Maude, a documentary in which Jason Watkins and his wife, Clara Francis, talk about the death of their daughter, Maude, who died from sepsis in 2011.
31	John Hardie, a former chief executive at ITN, is named as the chair of a review into the BBC's social media guidelines following the Gary Lineker controversy.

=== April ===
Date	Event
3	The BBC News Channel is merged with BBC World News to form a single worldwide news channel called BBC News, which launches at 9.00am. The channel is based on BBC World News output, but retains the ability to break away from international programming for a major UK news story. The weekday simulcasts of the BBC One news bulletins and BBC Breakfast continue to be shown on the channel and a simulcast of Newsnight is launched. The channel is launched by Ben Thompson who presents the first three hours, followed by Lucy Hockings from 12.00pm. There are also some minor glitches with the new logo. The first breakaway for UK news comes in the afternoon with coverage of the sentencing of Thomas Cashman for the murder of Olivia Pratt-Korbel, while international viewers continue with coverage of the Russian invasion of Ukraine, and the arrest of Donald Trump in the United States, which is presented by Matthew Amroliwala.
3	Ofcom launches an investigation into GB News over potential impartiality following a programme in which Chancellor Jeremy Hunt was interviewed by presenters and Conservative MPs Esther McVey and Philip Davies. Ofcom will look at whether the programme, aired on 11 March, broke its rules "requiring news and current affairs to be presented with due impartiality".
3	Ofcom finds that Nadine Dorries' interview with former Prime Minister Boris Johnson on TalkTV in February did not breach impartiality rules.
6	More4 have commissioned a six-part television version of the radio quiz PopMaster which will be presented by Ken Bruce and will be produced by 12 Yard.
6	ITV airs the 2023 Women's Finalissima between the Lionesses and Brazil live from Wembley Stadium. England eventually win the competition on penalties, thus achieving their second title in less than a year.
8–9	GB News airs The GB News Easter Special, a programme in which Calvin Robinson, an Anglican transitional deacon, discusses faith and contemporary issues with four Christian academics. The programme also includes singing and readings from religious text.
9	At 8pm ITV airs For the Love of Paul O'Grady, a tribute to Paul O'Grady, who died suddenly the previous month.
10	Netflix adds the S4C Welsh language crime drama Dal y Mellt (retitled Rough Cut) to its streaming service, the first time the platform has streamed a Welsh language series.
11	The BBC confirms its presenting line-up for its coronation coverage, with Kirsty Young and Huw Edwards fronting the coverage. David Dimbleby will also be part of the presenting team.
11	Jodie Whittaker, Bella Ramsey and Tamara Lawrance are to star in a second series of Jimmy McGovern's prison drama Time, with the second series set in a women's prison.
12	Rylan Clark-Neal announces he is stepping down as co-host of Strictly Come Dancing spin-off show It Takes Two after four years.
12	Elon Musk changes the BBC's Twitter description from "government funded media" to "publicly funded" after the broadcaster complained about its use.
13	Representatives from BBC Scotland, STV, Viaplay and the Scottish FA meet to discuss the broadcasting of men's football in Scotland, the rights of which are owned by Viaplay until 2028. The meeting, to discuss showing free-to-air matches, ends without resolution, but is described by Gavin Newlands MP as encouraging.
14	Television presenter Sarah Beeny confirms she has been given the all-clear from breast cancer following treatment.
17	The scheduled live episode of the US reality dating series Love Is Blind, due to air worldwide at 01:00 BST, is postponed after technical problems require it to be pre-recorded instead. Netflix apologises for the delay, and says the episode will be available from 18:00 BST.
17	The 2023 Eurovision Song Contest's final will include performances by Ukraine's Kalush Orchestra, winners of the 2022 contest, and runner-up Sam Ryder. Liverpool singer Sonia will also perform.
24	The final batch of tickets for the 2023 Eurovision Song Contest are released, with the majority selling out within an hour.
24	Stuart Field wins the 2022–23 series of Mastermind.
24	Murray Gold is to return as composer of Doctor Who for the programme's 60th anniversary specials.
25	AJ Odudu and Will Best are to present a revival of Big Brother on ITV2.
26	King Charles III and Queen Camilla officially reveal the set of the 2023 Eurovision Song Contest during a visit to Liverpool's M&S Bank Arena.
27	James Corden presents his final edition of The Late Late Show in the US, having decided to return to the UK. He is also joined by Adele for the final edition of Carpool Karaoke.
28	Richard Sharp resigns as Chairman of the BBC over his breach of the rules regarding public appointments after failing to declare his connection to a loan secured by former Prime Minister Boris Johnson worth £800,000.
29	Jeff Stelling announces he will step down from presenting Soccer Saturday on Sky Sports in May, having previously announced he would do so in 2022, then staying for another season.
29	David Dimbleby calls for a "cross party" public commission to decide the appointment of the next BBC chairman.

=== May ===
Date	Event
2	While broadcasting live from Buckingham Palace on GB News, Jacob Rees-Mogg is told to evacuate by police as a controlled explosion is carried out following the arrest of a man for throwing shotgun cartridges into the palace grounds.
2	An independent investigation is launched after the broadcasting union BECTU makes allegations of "bullying and a toxic culture" at Welsh-language TV channel S4C.
3	Bradley Walsh and his son Barney Walsh are to present a revival of Gladiators. The first two of the new Gladiators, Fury (Jodie Ounsley) and Steel (Zack George) were announced on The One Show.
3	Love Island contestant Samie Elishi, who appeared in the winter 2023 series, is having tests for thyroid cancer after viewers spotted a lump on her neck while she was on the show.
3	Former US President Donald Trump is a guest on Nigel Farage's GB News show.
5	In a joint statement, UK broadcasters and publishers, including Local TV Limited, TalkTV and GB News, criticise the BBC for what they claim to be a restriction on the access to pooled footage of the coronation, claiming it is preventing viewers from watching the event on the "platform of their choice".
6	The coronation of Charles III and Camilla takes place at Westminster Abbey and is the first ever coronation to air live on multiple television channels in the UK. Overnight viewing figures indicate it to have had a collective audience of 18 million, peaking at 20.4 million at the moment the King was crowned.
7	The BBC broadcasts the concert and lightshow from Windsor Castle to celebrate the coronation, on BBC One, BBC iPlayer, BBC Radio 2 and BBC Sounds. The concert includes performances by Lionel Richie and Katy Perry, both of which are livestreamed to an edition of American Idol in the United States. Overnight viewing figures indicate an average audience of 10.1 million, peaking at 12.3 million.
9	The first Eurovision 2023 semi-final takes place in Liverpool, and is broadcast on BBC One.
9	Ofcom finds GB News in breach of broadcasting regulations over its October 2021 edition of Mark Steyn's programme in which it was claimed the COVID-19 vaccination programme in the United Kingdom amounted to "mass murder". The regulator finds that GB News did not do enough to protect its viewers from harmful content, and rules that GB News must now attend a meeting with Ofcom.
10	Catherine Tate is announced as the person who will reveal the UK's results for the Eurovision Song Contest final once the voting has closed.
10	A Deadline Hollywood article suggests the UK's BBC News Channel has lost a million viewers since its merger with BBC World News. Figures collected by BARB indicated an audience of 10.7m for March 2023, compared with 9.7m for April 2023. The figure is also down on the 12.6m audience from April 2022.
11	BBC Radio 2 presenter Scott Mills makes a cameo appearance in Channel 4's Hollyoaks.
11	The second Eurovision 2023 semi-final is broadcast on BBC One.
12	Myleene Klass wins I'm a Celebrity... South Africa, ultimately becoming an official show legend in the process.
13	The grand final of the 2023 Eurovision Song Contest takes place in Liverpool. It is also broadcast live in cinemas around the UK for the first time. The contest is won by Sweden's Loreen with the song "Tattoo", who becomes only the second person to win the contest twice (and the first female winner). The United Kingdom's Mae Muller finishes 25th which is second to last with her song "I Wrote a Song". The event is watched by an average audience of 9.9 million, peaking at 11 million.
14	The 2023 British Academy Television Awards are held in London. Winners include the Channel 4 drama I Am Ruth (which wins awards for Best Single Drama, Best Actress for its star, Kate Winslet, and the Craft Award for Best Photography & Lighting for a work of Fiction) and BBC One's short comedy When Paddington Met the Queen (which wins the Memorable Moment Award).
16	Arqiva begins testing the replacement Bilsdale transmitter, and warns viewers in the area may face some interruption to their signal.
17	A set of stamps is released to celebrate the 40th anniversary of the release of The Black Adder. A programme called Blackadder: The Lost Pilot will also be broadcast by UKTV in June and feature Tony Robinson investigate the origins of the series, as well as screening a previously unknown pilot episode.
17	BBC One airs Matt Willis: Fighting Addiction, a documentary in which Matt Willis of Busted discusses his addiction to alcohol and drugs.
18	Ant McPartlin and Declan Donnelly announce they will take a break from Saturday Night Takeaway after the 2024 series.
18	Giant (Jamie Christian Johal), Fire (Montell Douglas) and Legend (Matt Morsia) are announced as 3 more of the new Gladiators for the upcoming BBC One revival as revealed on This Morning.
18	Global Radio have signed a deal with ITV to show highlights of the Capital Summertime Ball and Capital Jingle Bell Ball.
19	The BBC Board commissions a review of the BBC's coverage of topics relating to migration.
19	Diamond (Livi Sheldon) and Nitro (Harry Aikines-Aryeetey) are announced as two more of the new Gladiators for the upcoming BBC One revival as revealed on BBC Breakfast.
19	Channel 5 airs Episode 8,000 of Home and Away, the episode having previewed on 5STAR the previous day.
20	Phillip Schofield announces he is stepping down as co-host of This Morning after 21 years, and following rumours about a difficult relationship with his co-presenter, Holly Willoughby.
21	ITV confirms that Dermot O'Leary and Alison Hammond will present the 22 May edition of This Morning following the departure of Phillip Schofield. Schofield's former co-presenter, Holly Willoughby, who was scheduled to take a break from 29 May to coincide with the May Bank Holiday half-term, will instead be absent during the coming week.
22	Following the building of a new transmitter mast at Bilsdale, Transmission equipment at the Bilsdale transmitting station is switched on in the early hours of this day, thereby fully restoring Standard Definition TV signals to the area previously achievable prior to the August 2021 fire which resulted in the demolition of the original mast.
22	The first new news shows to launch on the BBC News Channel since the UK and global channels were merged begin. Running back-to-back on weekdays between 12noon and 8pm, they are BBC News Now, Verified Live and The Daily Global.
24	Netflix begins notifying UK customers they must pay an extra £4.99 a month in subscription fees if they wish to share their account with anyone outside their household.
25	Sabre (Sheli McCoy), Apollo (Alex Gray) and Dynamite (Emily Steel) are announced as 3 more of the new Gladiators for the upcoming BBC One revival as revealed on Steph's Packed Lunch.
26	Phillip Schofield announces his immediate resignation from ITV after admitting he lied about an affair he had with a young male ITV employee while he was still married. ITV confirms that his final scheduled ITV gig, the British Soap Awards, will go ahead and will be presented by someone else.
26	Springwatch presenter Iolo Williams announces he is stepping down from the series 19 due to a health issue.
27	ITV confirms that it investigated "rumours" of a relationship between Phillip Schofield and a younger male employee in 2020, but that both parties "categorically and repeatedly denied" it.
28	ITV confirms that the following day's edition of This Morning will run as scheduled, and that there are "no plans" to axe it.
29	Durham University wins the 2022–23 series of University Challenge, with Jeremy Paxman's final episode as presenter.
30	Derek Thompson, Casualty's longest-serving cast member, announces that he is leaving his role as Charlie Fairhead after 37 years.
30	Athena (Karenjeet Kaur Bains) and Comet (Ella-Mae Rayner) are announced as 2 more of the new Gladiators for the upcoming BBC One revival as revealed on Morning Live. Bionic (Matty Campbell), Electro (Jade Packer), Phantom (Toby Olubi) and Viper (Quang Luong) were also revealed later in The Sun completing the full Gladiators line-up bringing a total of 16 new gladiators.
30	A gang of five men who set up an illegal streaming operation to show cut-price live football are sentenced to prison following a trial at Derby Crown Court.
31	Two commercials for the alcoholic drink Litty Liquor and featuring the rapper ArrDee are banned by the Advertising Standards Authority for breaching rules due to the rapper's age.
31	With 50 days remaining until the start of the 2023 FIFA Women's World Cup, the sports ministers from the UK, France, Germany, Spain and Italy have urged broadcasters and FIFA to secure the unsold broadcasting rights to the competition.
31	Mark Clattenburg, Sonia Mkoloma and Lee Phillips are revealed as the new referees for the upcoming BBC One revival of Gladiators.
31	ITV confirms it has asked a barrister to hold an inquiry into its handling of the relationship between Phillip Schofield and a male employee.
31	Danielle Harold makes her final EastEnders appearance as Lola Pearce-Brown. The character is killed off following a storyline that saw her battle a Glioblastoma brain tumour.

=== June ===
Date	Event
1	Jane McDonald is announced as the new host of the 2023 British Soap Awards, after previous host Phillip Schofield stepped down on 26 May.
2	Phillip Schofield gives his first interview since the scandal which led to his resignation from This Morning, and describes his affair with a younger man as a "grave error", while blaming homophobia for fuelling coverage of the controversy.
2	Presenter Alison Hammond cries about Schofield's departure from ITV during an edition of This Morning, urging viewers not to blame Schofield and instead be compassionate.
4	Comedian Viggo Venn wins the 2023 series of Britain's Got Talent.
5	Love Island returns to ITV2 for a new series. Overnight viewing figures indicate the opening episode is seen by an average audience of 1.3 million, a million less than the same time in 2022.
6	The 2023 British Soap Awards (held on 3 June) are broadcast on ITV1. Winners include EastEnders, which is named Best British Soap, awhile Coronation Street wins the most awards of the evening.
7	Scott Brand, the husband of former Coronation Street actress Julie Goodyear, reveals the 81-year-old has been diagnosed with dementia.
7	The BBC announces that Bonnie Langford is reprising her role as Melanie Bush in the upcoming series of Doctor Who.
9	ITV confirms plans to launch My Mum, Your Dad, a Love Island-style show for middle aged single parents, as part of its Autumn 2023 schedule. Unlike Love Island, the show will take place at a country house rather than at a tropical location.
9	Mirror Group Newspapers apologises to the former Coronation Street actress Nikki Sanderson after admitting during an ongoing court case that it hired private investigators to get stories about her.
9	Television presenter Anne Diamond reveals she has been undergoing treatment for breast cancer.
9	Katie Waissel, a contestant on the 2010 series of The X Factor, has claimed her mental health was mocked by the show's staff during her time on the series.
12	The broadcasting regulator Ofcom announces it is conducting research into public attitudes towards current affairs programmes presented by politicians with a view to a potential change in the rules regarding such shows.
14	ITV chief executive Dame Carolyn McCall appears before the House of Commons Committee on Culture, Media and Sport, where she tells MPs the affair between Phillip Schofield and a young male employee was "deeply inappropriate", but that she had not had evidence of its existence until recently.
14	The BBC and ITV confirm they will broadcast the 2023 FIFA Women's World Cup, five weeks before the start of the Tournament.
15	It is announced that Lenny Rush will portray Morris in the upcoming series of Doctor Who.
16	Among those from the world of television and entertainment to be recognised in the 2023 Birthday Honours (the first issued by King Charles III) are Celia Imrie and Kenneth Cranham, who are made CBEs, and Vicky McClure and Davina McCall, who become MBEs.
18	Adolfo Corrado is named 2023 Cardiff Singer of the World.
20	Welsh language channel S4C apologises after presenters on its afternoon show, Prynhawn Da, confused two Welsh rappers.
21	Michelle Collins returns to EastEnders as the character Cindy Beale 25 years after producers killed her off in a storyline in which she was said to have died in prison. Producers also confirm that Adam Woodyatt will also return to the soap to reprise the role of Ian Beale.
21	Disney warns that UK prices for Disney+ may increase because of a change in regulations requiring them to remind customers about their streaming subscription every six months.
21	Former Brookside actor Louis Emerick is given a 26-week suspended prison sentence by Wirral Magistrates' Court after hitting two girls with his car in October 2022.
21	Ofcom have received 61 complaints about the 18 June edition of GB News's Headliners in which Lewis Schaffer made a string of claims about Coronavirus, including that it was not a real virus.
22	On the eve of the seventh anniversary of the EU referendum, BBC One airs a special edition of Question Time consisting exclusively of Leave voters. The UK government is not represented on the panel of guests after the government declines to send someone on to the programme.
22	Former MasterChef contestant Carwyn Ash is sentenced to three years in prison following a trial at Cardiff Crown Court in which he was convicted of possessing indecent images of children and extreme pornography, and attempting to blackmail police into having the charges against him dropped.
23	Debut of Lee Anderson's new show, Lee Anderson's Real World, on GB News. The first edition sees him joined by fellow MP Brendan Clarke-Smith, who he spoon feeds baked beans as part of a taste test.
24	The Sun reports that Ross Kemp had planned to mark the 110th anniversary of the sinking of RMS Titanic by recording a documentary for Sky History in which he would undertake a dive to the wreckage using the Titan, the submersible which disappeared during a voyage to the ocean floor. But the project was shelved after production company Atlantic Productions deemed the Titan to be unsafe and not "fit for purpose".
25	Elton John plays the final UK concert of his farewell tour at Glastonbury 2023, headlining the Pyramid Stage on the festival's final day. The concert, televised on BBC One, draws an audience of 7.3 million, giving the BBC's Glastonbury coverage its largest number of viewers, and an almost 50% audience.
26	ITN appoints Katie Storry as deputy editor of the Jeremy Vine programme.
26	Ryan Reynolds and S4C agree a deal to broadcast Welsh language programmes in the United States on Reynolds's Fubo channel under the banner of Welsh Wednesdays.
26	The TV version of Ken Bruce's pop music quiz, PopMaster, makes its debut on More4.
27	Professor Dame Elan Closs Stephens takes up the role of Acting Chair of the BBC following the departure of Richard Sharp.
27	Graham Norton is to present a revival of Wheel of Fortune on ITV.
27	Nigel Farage is heckled and booed as he accepts an award for best news presenter for his GB News programme at the 2023 TRIC Awards.
29	A third party software glitch leads to incorrect weather information being displayed on BBC weather forecasts on television, online and via the BBC Weather app.
29	Gareth Lewis, the drivetime presenter on BBC Radio Wales, is appointed Political Editor at BBC Cymru Wales.
29	Conservative MP Lee Anderson faces censure from the Serjeant at Arms of the House of Commons for filming a promotional video for his GB News programme on Parliamentary property without permission.

=== July ===
Date	Event
1	BBC Two airs a special edition of Later... with Jools Holland dedicated entirely to Noel Gallagher to coincide with the release of Council Skies, the fourth studio album by his band, Noel Gallagher's High Flying Birds.
3	Sky News makes major changes to its weekday line-up. Sky News Today now airs from 10am until 4.30pm with Ian King Live renamed Business Live and broadcasting in two half-hour slots at 11.30am and 4.30pm.
3	Ofcom launches investigations into an episode of Jacob Rees-Mogg's State of the Nation that aired on GB News on 9 May, and an edition of Richard Tice presented by Alex Salmond on TalkTV on 2 April, both of which covered news stories, but were presented by politicians. The State of the Nation investigation will establish whether the edition of the programme, which covered a jury verdict on former US President Donald Trump, complies with broadcast regulations, while the Richard Tice investigation will look at whether the programme was presented with due impartiality. The former received 40 complaints after airing, while the latter received two.
3	Vicky Richardson wins the first series of More4's PopMaster TV.
4	It is announced that Ant and Dec will produce a reboot of BBC children's television series Byker Grove.
4	Ideal World temporarily suspended TV broadcasts and website until further notice. It was later revealed that the channel had collapsed into administration.
4	Broadcaster and journalist Fiona Phillips, 62, reveals that she has been diagnosed with Alzheimer's disease.
5	A spokesman for News UK, owners of TalkTV, says there are no plans to close the channel despite low viewing figures, and reports Rupert Murdoch was planning to shut it down by the end of the year.
5	Media expert Chris Banatvala, who drew up the UK's broadcasting rules, urges Ofcom to decide whether politicians should be allowed to present programmes on news channels.
5	Sky and Virgin Media announce that TCM Movies is to close and will no longer be available on its platforms.
7	Ofcom launches an investigation into a GB News campaign that urges the UK government to introduce legislation to stop "Britain becoming a cashless society" following a complaint. The "Don't Kill Cash" petition, which has been signed by more than 166,000 people, potentially breaches Ofcom's rules that require broadcasters to not comment on "matters of political and industrial controversy or current public policy".
7	A story printed in The Sun alleges that a yet-to-be-named BBC presenter paid a teenage girl for sexually explicit photos when she was 17. In response the BBC says it is investigating and that the presenter is not scheduled to be on air in the coming days.
8	Channel 4 shows the final of the 2023 UEFA European Under-21 Championship between England and Spain.
9	The Sun prints fresh allegations about a yet-to-be-named BBC presenter, alleging that he stripped down to his underpants during a video call to the girl. Several male public figures associated with the BBC speak out to say they are not the individual concerned. Culture Secretary Lucy Frazer holds an urgent meeting with BBC Director General Tim Davie at which he tells her the BBC is investigating the matter "swiftly and sensitively". The BBC subsequently confirms it has suspended the presenter and referred the matter to the police.
10	A lawyer representing the young person who was allegedly paid by a BBC presenter for indecent photographs has cast doubt on the story. In a letter to the BBC the lawyer says that his client contacted The Sun on 7 July to tell the newspaper there was "no truth in it". The paper is said to have subsequently printed the "inappropriate article" containing allegations made by the client's mother.
10	The Parliamentary Commissioner for Standards opens an investigation into Conservative MP Lee Anderson for using the roof of his Westminster office to film a promotional video for his GB News show.
11	A second young woman comes forward to make allegations about the BBC presenter at the centre of a scandal, claiming that she was contacted by him on a dating app and sent abusive and threatening messages. The woman, in her early 20s, also says she felt under pressure to meet up, although she did do so.
12	Huw Edwards is identified by his wife as the BBC presenter being investigated for allegedly paying a 17 year old for sexually explicit photos. His wife also says that Edwards is receiving in-patient hospital care after an episode of depression following the publication of the allegations.
12	Following an investigation into the Edwards allegations, the Metropolitan Police releases a statement to say detectives have determined criminal offence has been committed.
13	The BBC resumes its investigation into Huw Edwards after the police concluded the newsreader had been involved in any illegal activity.
14	The First Night of the Proms is briefly interrupted by two protestors from Just Stop Oil, who climb on stage at the Royal Albert Hall and unfurl an orange banner, before being removed by security staff. The group also interrupts Channel 4's The Last Leg while it is live on air.
15	Lucy Spraggan, who withdrew as a contestant from the 2012 series of The X Factor, tells The Guardian she was raped by a hotel porter during the filming of the series. In a subsequent BBC News interview she describes taking part in the show as like being in "an abusive relationship".
17	Richard Curtis, writer of the 2003 Christmas film Love Actually, announces plans for Christmas Actually, a stage production featuring music, performance poetry and comedy in aid of Comic Relief.
17	Amol Rajan presents his first edition of University Challenge after taking over the role from Jeremy Paxman.
18	A technical glitch leads to sound problems during a BBC Breakfast report from Melbourne, Australia on Victoria's decision to cancel its plans to host the 2026 Commonwealth Games.
18	GB News presenter Dan Wootton says that he has made "errors of judgement in the past" but denied any criminality following allegations he offered to pay colleagues several thousand points for explicit pictures of themselves.
18	Following the BBC's revival of the British version of Gladiators, the Australian version of the show is confirmed to return for the second time and is set to be revived by Warner Bros. Television Studios.
24	BBC News apologises to Nigel Farage for inaccurate reporting during a 4 July report into the closure of his Coutts bank account, blaming a source close to the matter for the mistake.
24	Futurama returns for a second revival exclusively on Disney+.
25	The Culture, Media and Sport Committee writes to The Sun and the BBC to gain a better understanding of their handling of allegations made against BBC newsreader Huw Edwards.
26	Cardiff-based surgeon Asmaa Al-allak wins the 2023 series of The Great British Sewing Bee.
26	TV chef James Martin is asked to change his behaviour at work after ITV received complaints about his treatment of production staff during filming of his series James Martin's Spanish Adventure.
27	Former BBC News presenter Yalda Hakim announces she is to join Sky News.
28	BBC News Online reports that a clip of GB News presenter Neil Oliver accusing the BBC "and others" of "driving fear" over climate change by using "supposedly terrifying temperatures", has been viewed more than two million times on social media since Oliver made the comments four days earlier during a discussion about the 2023 Rhodes wildfires.
29	It is reported that Shona McGarty is set to leave her role of Whitney Dean in EastEnders after fifteen years, while Lorraine Stanley, who plays Karen Taylor, is axed from the soap after six years.

=== August ===
Date	Event
1	Virgin Media becomes the first UK television provider to launch FAST channels on its EPG. However, these channels are only available to customers who have Virgin Media's newest set-top boxes.
2	The BBC tells television presenter Chris Hughes that his description of a female cricketer as a "little Barbie" was not appropriate. The comment was made when he interviewed Maitlan Brown during BBC Two's coverage of The Hundred.
3	Media Nation 2023, Ofcom's annual report into viewing and listening habits, is published, and indicates a significant fall in the proportion of people watching linear television, from 83% in 2021 to 79% in 2022.
3	The Media Nation report also indicates that Channel 4 comedy Derry Girls was the most watched programme in Northern Ireland during 2022. Northern Ireland is the only region of the UK where a Channel 4 programme featured in the top ten most watched programmes.
3	DMG Media confirms it has suspended the Mail Online column written by GB News presenter Dan Wootton while it investigates "a series of allegations" against him.
3	Following a protest by Greenpeace activists, who climbed on to the roof of Rishi Sunak's house, GB News stages a stunt in retaliation for the demonstration. Reporter Ben Leo is sent to Greenpeace's London offices without invitation. During the visit he speaks to Greenpeace officials, wanders around the premises, and makes himself a cup of tea.
4	UTV presenter Pamela Ballantine reveals to the Belfast Telegraph that she was diagnosed with breast cancer in 2022 and has undergone successful chemotherapy, and urges women to have breast screening tests.
4	Angela Rippon is confirmed as a contestant on Series 21 of Strictly Come Dancing, becoming the show's oldest contestant at the age of 78.
5	The Sun reports that Lucy Fallon is returning to Coronation Street to reprise her role as Bethany Platt, with the character appearing on screen shortly after Christmas.
7	Ofcom launches four separate investigations into impartiality at GB News, three of them relating to programmes presented by Jacob Rees-Mogg, Phillip Davies and Esther McVey, and the fourth concerning an edition of Laurence Fox's show presented by Martin Daubney. The investigations concern politicians presenting news coverage.
7	Midlands Today presenter Nick Owen reveals that he has undergone surgery following a diagnosis of prostate cancer.
9	Caroline Dinenage, chair of the House of Commons Culture, Media and Sport Committee, says the Committee has received a "large number" of complaints from past and present members of staff at ITV's This Morning about allegations of harassment, bullying and discrimination at the programme.
9	Comedian Hardeep Singh Kohli is arrested and charged in connection with "non-recent" sexual offences.
9	BBC Scotland's Political Editor, Glenn Campbell, announces he is undergoing treatment for a brain tumour.
9	Bosses at Welsh language channel S4C have said they will not apologise for introducing some English language content on the channel as they wish to encourage people to speak English and reflect how it is used throughout Wales.
10	Disney+ announce plans to launch a new streaming service with adverts in November, which will have a cheaper subscription price.
10	Byline Times reports several allegations of "racism, sexism and misogyny" involving staff and senior figures at GB News.
14	The BBC's Maida Vale Studios, which have been the venue for performances by artists including The Beatles and Adele, are sold to a group led by composer Hans Zimmer.
14	EastEnders producer Chris Clenshaw announces the series will feature a storyline in which the character Alfie Moon (played by Shane Richie) will be diagnosed with prostate cancer. The soap's writers have consulted cancer charities including Macmillan Cancer Support and Prostate Cancer UK for the storyline.
14	Drama begins screening classic episodes of the BBC medical soap opera Doctors.
17	Comedian Tom Binns, creator of the fictional hospital radio presenter Ivan Brackenberry, is sentenced to 10 months imprisonment, suspended for 15 months, after admitting charges relating to 35,000 indecent images of children found on his computer at Derby Crown Court.
20	BBC One broadcasts the 2023 FIFA Women's World Cup final which sees England defeated by Spain 1–0. Overnight viewing figures indicate the match to have had a peak audience of 12 million, with 3.9 million watching online.
22	Radio Caroline launches on Freeview channel 277 via the radio portal, and is available throughout England.
22	BBC Look East's Louise Priest presents her final lunchtime bulletin for the BBC after 40 years with the broadcaster, having decided to retire.
23	Louis Theroux delivers the prestigious MacTaggart Lecture at the Edinburgh International Television Festival.
23	UKTV launches its first four FAST channels – UKTV Play Heroes, UKTV Play Laughs, UKTV Play Full Throttle and UKTV Play Uncovered.
24	Shop Extra starts broadcasting.
24	Matt Willis and Emma Willis are revealed as the presenters of Love Is Blind: UK.
25	Producers of The Crown say they have recreated the death of Diana, Princess of Wales "delicately" and with sensitivity ahead of the series final season.
27	ITV1 aired the CITV block for the last time, before CITV closes. However the following weekend, some of its shows would later start showing on ITV2.
28	Ted Lasso star Hannah Waddingham, who was scheduled to present the BBC Fantasy, Myths And Legends Prom at the Royal Albert Hall, pulls out of the event hours before it is due to take place saying she is doing so in solidarity with those participating in the 2023 SAG-AFTRA strike in the United States. Her role is taken by BBC Radio 3 presenter Katie Derham and Radio 1 critic Ali Plumb.
30	Sir Mark Thompson, former Director-General of the BBC, is appointed chief executive of CNN, succeeding Chris Licht.

=== September ===
Date	Event
1	CITV closes for the final time at 9.00pm. Its programming moved to ITVX Kids and ITV2, and all its shows are now available to watch on ITVX. However, a daily four-hour breakfast block of children's programmes will launch on ITV2 and the pre-school linear output will continue to air on ITVBe.
1	Ahead of the launch of its 14th series, The Great British Bake Off announces it is scrapping its national themed weeks following complaints from some viewers.
1	Channel 5 begins adding episodes of Prisoner; Cell Block H to its streaming service My5.
4	Who Wants to Be a Millionaire? celebrates its 25th anniversary.
5	The 28th National Television Awards are held in London, with BBC drama Happy Valley winning best drama. Sarah Lancashire also wins two awards.
5	ITV confirms Love Island: All-Stars, with the new series set to take place in South Africa in 2024.
6	BBC Sport director Barbara Slater announces she will retire in 2024.
6	The Glasgow Herald reports that controversial GB News presenter Neil Oliver has resigned from the Royal Society of Edinburgh.
6	Gogglebox stars Stephen and Daniel Lustig-Webb announce they have left the show after 10 and 4 years respectively. Stephen previously appeared with friend Chris and mum Pat.
7	Crime drama Top Boy comes to an end, after 12 years.
8	Wynne Evans wins the 2023 series of Celebrity MasterChef.
8	Channel 4 announces changes to the broadcast of its soap opera Hollyoaks, with daily episodes no longer airing in their early evening slot on Channel 4 from 25 September. Daily episodes will continue to be broadcast on E4, with a "streaming-first" policy seeing episodes available to livestream the day before, then made available on YouTube a week after airing. The Sunday omnibus edition will continue on Channel 4.
9	A clip of GB News presenter Martin Daubney presenting a breaking news article about the arrest of prison escapee Daniel Khalife goes viral after Daubney becomes flustered while trying to report the story.
10	Alastair Stewart reveals he has been diagnosed with dementia and has had a series of strokes, describing how the diagnosis was made after he felt "discombobulated".
11	Ofcom finds the TV channel Drama in breach of its regulations after two expletives were included in subtitling of an episode of Casualty that aired on 12 June at 10.30am. UKTV, Drama's parent company, responds that responsibility for subtitling was outsourced and that the matter has been addressed by the company concerned.
12	ITV secures exclusive UK broadcasting rights to the Academy Awards ceremony after the 20-year deal between Disney and Sky to show the event expires. It will begin its coverage with the 2024 ceremony.
13	It is reported that former BBC News presenter Joanna Gosling is to join the family law firm Irwin Mitchell as a senior associate and mediator, helping couples to resolve disputes without going to court.
14	It is confirmed that Miriam Margolyes will voice Beep the Meep in the Doctor Who 60th anniversary specials.
14	The BBC have acquired the rights to AMC Network's series Interview with the Vampire.
14	As part of a general schedule shake up, News UK announce a new weekday breakfast show for TalkTV and TalkRadio presented by Jeremy Kyle and Nicola Thorp, with a start date to be confirmed.
14	John Ryley, the former head of Sky News who stood down from the role in May, delivers the Royal Television Society's prestigious Steve Hewlett Memorial Lecture, and accuses Buckingham Palace spin doctors of censoring coverage of the King's coronation.
16	Comedian and actor Russell Brand is accused by four women of rape, sexual assaults, and emotional abuse between 2006 and 2013, following a joint investigation by the Sunday Times and Channel 4's Dispatches. Brand releases a video denying "serious criminal allegations".
16	The twenty-first series of Strictly Come Dancing begins on BBC One.
17	The BBC says it is "urgently looking into the issues raised" by allegations about Russell Brand, while Channel 4 launches an internal investigation.
18	Neighbours returns to UK television via Amazon Freevee, showing four episodes a week from Mondays to Thursdays.
18	An Ofcom investigation into a GB News programme during which Esther McVey and Phillip Davies interviewed Chancellor Jeremy Hunt before the 2023 budget finds the programme failed to include an "appropriately wide range of significant views".
19	The BBC removes content featuring Russell Brand from its streaming services, while Director-General Tim Davie review of complaints against Brand during his time at the BBC.
19	Tasha Stones, a 27-year-old participation officer from Bristol, is named as the first deaf contestant to appear on The Great British Bake Off.
20	Guy Mowbray is confirmed as the new commentator for the upcoming BBC One revival of Gladiators.
20	Alex Mahon, the chief executive of Channel 4, describes the allegations against Russell Brand as "horrendous" and says the entertainment industry must confront bad behaviour.
21	Government plans to tighten online safety could include extending Ofcom's remit to cover online television channels, with recent figures finding that 70% of households have access to Smart TVs that allow access to as many as 900 online television channels.
21	GB News says it is continuing to "monitor" allegations against Dan Wootton, but that they have not been "proved by an independent body".
21	Former Labour Party adviser Scarlet Mccgwire is the victim of mistaken identity after a mix up leads to her being booked as a guest on TalkTV, where presenter Ian Collins believes he is talking to Scarlet Maguire, a director of polling company JL Partners.
22	Amazon is to begin including adverts in its Prime Video streaming service from 2024 as a way of generating more money for its shows.
26	Alison Hammond makes her debut as co-presenter of The Great British Bake Off alongside Noel Fielding.
26	David Walliams files a High Court case against Fremantle, makers of Britain's Got Talent, over data protection.
27	GB News suspends Laurence Fox and Dan Wootton after comments made on the previous evening's edition of Tonight with Dan Wootton during which Fox asked "what self-respecting man" would "climb into bed" with journalist Ava Evans. GB News says it will formally apologise to Evans for the remarks.
28	Following the BBC sports presenter crisis in March, a BBC report recommends that high-profile presenters should be allowed to express views on issues and policies but stop short of political campaigning.
28	Ofcom launches an investigation into the 26 September edition of the GB News programme Dan Wootton Tonight after receiving 7,300 complaints about comments made by Laurence Fox, while MailOnline terminates its contract with Wootton, who wrote a twice weekly column for the newspaper.
28	The final ever episode of Paul O'Grady: For the Love of Dogs is broadcast on ITV1 following his death earlier in the year.
29	GB News boss Angelos Frangopoulos tells the BBC Laurence Fox's comments about Ava Evans were "way past the limits of acceptance" and that GB News is conducting its own investigation into what happened, which he expects "to be resolved very quickly".
29	Laurence Fox apologises for his comments about Ava Evans, describing them as "demeaning" and "not representative of who I am".
29	Calvin Robinson, who presents a religious affairs programme for GB News, becomes the third presenter to be suspended by the news channel after voicing his support for Dan Wootton in an online post. Robinson said he would not appear on Dan Wootton Tonight without Wootton, claiming "if he falls, we all fall".
29	Ahead of the broadcast of an interview with Conservative Home Secretary Suella Braverman conducted by Conservative deputy chair and GB News presenter Lee Anderson, the chief executive of Ofcom, Melanie Dawes, says there are no present rules to prevent GB News using Anderson to interview Braverman.

=== October ===
Date	Event
2	Allegations surface that GB News is employing at least five people who have faced allegations of sexual impropriety, including one accused of rape.
3	The BBC's royal correspondent, Nicholas Witchell, announces he will retire in 2024 after five decades with the BBC and 25 years as its royal correspondent.
3	TalkTV appoints Lucy Johnston as editor of its new breakfast show, Talk Today.
4	Laurence Fox and Calvin Robinson are sacked from GB News following the controversy over comments made by Fox about journalist Ava Evans.
4	The number of Ofcom complaints received about the edition of Dan Wootton Tonight in which Fox made his comments about Ava Evans has passed 8,000.
6	A man is charged with attempting to solicit murder over an alleged plot to kidnap This Morning presenter Holly Willoughby.
8	Following a five-year break from transmission, Big Brother returns with a simulcast on ITV1 and ITV2 following the network's acquistion of its rights. AJ Odudu and Will Best make their debuts as double hosts instead of a single-host format for the past nineteen series of Big Brother. Overnight viewing data indicates the episode is watched by an audience of 2.5 million.
9	BBC One airs the first episode of its series The Reckoning, starring Steve Coogan as Jimmy Savile. The programme wins praise from critics, particularly for Coogan's portrayal of Savile.
10	Holly Willoughby announces that she is quitting This Morning after 14 years presenting the programme.
11	Defence Secretary Grant Shapps criticises the BBC for its choice not to refer to Hamas militants as "terrorists" during reports about the Gaza war, describing the policy as "verging on disgraceful" and urging the BBC to find its "moral compass".
11	Sports presenter Steve Rider reveals he has been diagnosed with prostate cancer and is to undergo treatment.
12	Television presenter Yvette Fielding, who joined the BBC's Blue Peter as its youngest presenter in 1987 when she was 18, makes allegations that she was bullied while working on the programme and almost left as a result of it.
12	Llinos Griffin-Williams steps down as S4C's chief content officer following allegations of "inappropriate incidents" involving heated exchanges with production staff at a bar in France during the Rugby World Cup match between Wales and Georgia. S4C subsequently confirms she has been dismissed, and it is alleged that during the incidents she told former Wales scrum half Mike Phillips, who is part of the presenting team, that his Welsh skills were not good enough and that she could end his career.
13	The Sun reports that Freddie Flintoff has agreed a compensation package with BBC Studios worth £9m after being injured while filming an episode of Top Gear.
14	Red paint is sprayed over the BBC headquarters in central London. A pro-Palestinian group claims responsibility, citing the broadcaster's coverage of the Israel-Hamas war, but the Metropolitan police confirms the incident is linked to a protest group and says at least five arrests have been made.
17	GB News is removed from the internal television system of the Senedd following comments made by Laurence Fox, which a spokesman for the Presiding Officer describes as "deliberately offensive".
18	Pick rebrands as Sky Mix. The relaunch sees the channel return to its original Freeview channel number on channel 11.
18	The BBC announces that Doctors has been cancelled and will air its final episode in December 2024, after 24 years on air. The decision was made due to the financial strain of moving the set from Selly Oak to Digbeth as part of BBC Birmingham's ventures to create a new base for their productions.
18	Local TV Limited's eight stations are rebranded as Talk TV, followed by the individual channel's broadcast area. TalkTV now broadcasts on these channels for 15 hours each day.
19	Kirsty Wark announces she will leave BBC Two's Newsnight after 30 years as a presenter, departing after the next general election.
19	Channel 4 announces it will not renew its contract for Steph's Packed Lunch, and the show will finish in December.
19	Appearing before the Senedd Culture Committee, former Culture Secretary Sir John Whittingdale suggests that Welsh rugby could be added to the list of sporting events that must be available free-to-air on television if the Senedd requested it.
20	The BBC axes its Match of the Day spin-off programme, MOTDx, after four years on air.
23	Ofcom finds GB News breached its regulations on impartiality during a programme which aired on 16 June. Former Brexit Party MEP Martin Daubney was standing in for Laurence Fox when he interviewed Reform Party leader Richard Tice and discussed immigration. Ofcom finds Tice was not "sufficiently challenged" on his views and "the limited alternative views presented were dismissed". However, Ofcom decides that Lee Anderson's interview with Home Secretary Suella Braverman did not breach their impartiality rules as it was a current affairs programme.
23	The BBC confirms that actress Amanda Abbington has withdrawn from the twenty-first series of Strictly Come Dancing following reports she had quit the contest because of personal reasons.
23	Coronation Street confirms that comedian Jack Carroll will join the soap in early 2024 as Bobby, a nephew of the character Carla Connor.
25	BBC Director General Tim Davie attends a meeting with Conservative MPs, where there is a heated discussion about the BBC's controversial decision not to describe Hamas as a terrorist organisation in its news reports of the Israel–Hamas conflict.
25	Welsh Conservative leader Andrew RT Davies appears on Nigel Farage's GB News programme, later facing criticism from a senior Welsh Government minister for "appalling misogyny" for suggesting that Senedd Convenor Elin Jones was too "busy doing her hair" to appear on the programme.
27	GB News have hired former Prime Minister Boris Johnson to present a series "showcasing the power of Britain around the world"; he will also help to provide coverage of the next UK and US elections.
27	A report produced by MPs on the Welsh Affairs Committee calls for the Six Nations Championship to be included on the list of free-to-air sporting events. Although the contest is aired on terrestrial television, it is not currently on the list of sporting events guaranteed to remain free.
31	An Ofcom study has pinpointed a 2003 Little Britain sketch in which a character played by David Walliams uses racist slurs against an Asian character as "explicitly racist and outdated".

=== November ===
Date	Event
7	Disney have defended their decision to recreate the aftermath of the 7 July 2005 London bombings for their drama Suspect: The Shooting of Jean Charles de Menezes after survivors of the terrorist attacks described it as "shameful".
10	ITV announce that they will be reviving Celebrity Big Brother in early 2024, following the success of ITV2's civilian series revival. The series will air on ITV1 and ITVX, with the spin off series, Late and Live, remaining on ITV2, and live streaming remaining on ITVX.
12	Ofcom chair Michael Grade tells Sunday with Laura Kuenssberg that Ofcom does not "want to be in the business of telling broadcasters, licensees, who they can employ, who they can't employ". The comment comes in response to questions as to whether GB News should be allowed to employ politicians as presenters on its channel.
12	After homophobic and racist social media posts made a decade ago by Big Brother contestant Trish Balusa emerge, producers of the reality show launch an investigation into why they were not identified before she took part in the series.
14	Iceland says it will not run a Christmas advertising campaign for 2023, but will instead spend the money on supporting its customers.
15	Senedd Presiding Officer Elin Jones announces an independent review of television channels that will be available in the Senedd building following her previous ban of GB News.
16	Media including The Telegraph and Press Gazette report that in response to an advertiser boycott, GB News have introduced an online paywall with three membership tiers. This it part of a strategy to obtain fresh income streams following substantial financial losses in its first year.
17	BBC One broadcasts the 2023 Children in Need telethon, which includes a Doctor Who special starring David Tennant as the Fourteenth Doctor. The night raises £33.5m for charity.
17	Jordan Sangha wins the twentieth series of Big Brother, becoming ITV2's first ever Big Brother winner.
20	Deal or No Deal returns on ITV1 and ITVX.
20	Llinos Griffin-Williams launches legal proceedings against S4C for unfair dismissal.
21	The BBC shelves its motoring series Top Gear "for the foreseeable future" following Freddie Flintoff's accident during the filming of an edition of the show in 2022.
21	Amazon Studios announces it is producing A Very Royal Scandal, a three-part dramatization centred around the 2019 Emily Maitlis interview with Prince Andrew over his relationship with Jeffrey Epstein. Ruth Wilson has been cast as Maitlis and Michael Sheen as the prince.
23	Doctor Who celebrates its 60th anniversary.
24	Sian Doyle is sacked from the role of chief executive of S4C following a review into allegations of "bullying and a toxic culture" at the Welsh broadcaster.
25	David Tennant makes his full-length return to Doctor Who, as the Fourteenth Doctor in the first 60th anniversary special "The Star Beast", the first episode to be written and produced by Russell T Davies since leaving the show after "The End of Time" on New Year's Day 2010. The episode also sees the return of Catherine Tate as Donna Noble and watched by an overnight audience of 5.08 million viewers, the highest overnight viewership since "Resolution" (2019), which received 5.15 million overnight viewers, and the biggest launch for a British television drama series of 2023 so far.
26	France's Zoé Clauzure wins the Junior Eurovision Song Contest 2023 with her song "Cœur", making France the second country to win the contest twice in a row. Stand Uniqu3, representing the United Kingdom, finishes in fourth place, achieving the BBC's best result at the contest since taking over participation from ITV, and the UK's best result since returning to the contest in 2022.
27	Fremantle, the producer of Britain's Got Talent, have reached an "amicable resolution" with David Walliams, whose private comments about contestants were leaked to the media in 2022.
27	ITV announces that Grace Dent has left series 23 of I'm a Celebrity...Get Me Out of Here! due to medical grounds.
28	The Radio Today website reports that Bauer Media is to remove all of its radio stations from Sky, Virgin Media and Freesat by 13 December.
29	BBC News announces plans to make £500m of savings, which includes shortening Newsnight to a 30-minute "interview, debate and discussion show", and moving the BBC One O'Clock News to Manchester and extending the programme to an hour.
29	ITV announces that Jamie Lynn Spears has left series 23 of I'm a Celebrity...Get Me Out of Here! due to medical grounds.
29	UKTV announces that in 2024 all of UKTV's free-to-air channels and UKTV Play will be rebranded with the new name of "U". For example Dave will become "U&Dave". UKTV also said they plan to rebrand their pay channels in the same way, but at a later date.

=== December ===
Date	Event
1	The BBC pulls an edition of Christmas University Challenge after two contestants complained about a lack of provision for their disabilities.
2	Nigel Harman withdraws from the quarter final of Strictly Come Dancing after suffering an injury.
2	Producers of I'm a Celebrity...Get Me Out of Here! apologise after the series' Instagram account liked a post that "contained unacceptable language" about contestant Nella Rose.
2	Bernard Cribbins makes his final appearance as the Doctor Who character Wilfred Mott, the scenes featuring him filmed before his death in July 2022.
3	UEFA have launched an investigation after sex noises were transmitted during the broadcast of the previous day's Euro 2024 draw. YouTube prankster Daniel Jarvis has claimed responsibility for the incident.
4	The Premier League announces broadcasting arrangements for the four seasons from 2025/26, and will see all matches not kicking off at 3pm on a Saturday shown live for the first time. The number of matches that Sky will televise will almost double, increasing from 128 games per season to a minimum of 215 games. The increase is partly due to Sky taking over the midweek rounds previously shown by Amazon and by showing all ten fixtures from the final day of the season. Highlights will continue to be broadcast by the BBC.
5	More than £42,000 has been raised for a Deal or No Deal contestant living with Motor Neurone Disease after he won £5 on the show. Brad Wale had talked about wanting to fulfil a bucket list during his edition of the game show, and the fundraiser was started by a fellow contestant to raise his target of £20,000.
6	Television executive Samir Shah is appointed as the new chairman of the BBC.
6	A report by the BECTU trade union claims that former S4C boss Sian Doyle behaved like a dictator and created a "culture of fear" at the Welsh language broadcaster.
6	Television and radio presenter Carol Vorderman discloses that she rejected an offer from GB News after leaving BBC Radio Wales over the BBC's new social media guidelines.
7	Culture Secretary Lucy Frazer confirms the TV licence fee will increase by £10.50 from £159 to £169.50 from 1 April 2024.
7	An ITV investigation concludes that the broadcaster made "considerable efforts" to find the truth about rumours of a relationship between Phillip Schofield and a colleague in 2019, but could prove nothing until he admitted to the affair.
7	Former S4C chief executive Sian Doyle is reported to have been admitted to hospital after taking an overdose.
7	The BBC has launched dedicated news pages on its website for Wolverhampton, Peterborough, Bradford and Sunderland.
9	Ncuti Gatwa makes his onscreen debut as the Fifteenth Doctor in the Doctor Who episode "The Giggle", which sees him feature alongside David Tennant's Fourteenth Doctor when the character bi-generates.
10	The BBC says it is considering a judgement criticising it for not releasing documents relating to Martin Bashir's 1995 interview with Diana, Princess of Wales.
10	Sam Thompson wins the 23rd series of I'm A Celebrity...Get Me Out Of Here!. The final is watched by an average of 6.6 million viewers.
11	Gary Lineker comes under fresh criticism after putting his signature to a letter opposing the UK government's Rwanda asylum plan, with Defence Secretary Grant Shapps questioning whether he should be expressing political views.
11	Sky News reports that GB News has asked its investors for a further £30m in capital.
15	The BBC confirms it has stopped production of Question of Sport, citing financial pressures, but says the series will return in the future.
16	Olly Alexander has been chosen to represent the UK at the 2024 Eurovision Song Contest in Sweden; his participation is announced during the final of Strictly Come Dancing.
16	Ellie Leach and dance partner Vito Coppola win the twenty-first series of Strictly Come Dancing, beating runners-up Bobby Brazier and Dianne Buswell and Layton Williams and Nikita Kuzmin.
16	Matthew Haywood wins Survivor 2023.
17	The Information Commissioner's Office says its criminal investigations team is looking into claims the BBC withheld documents relating to Martin Bashir's 1995 interview with Diana, Princess of Wales.
17	Ian Wright announces he is to leave his role as a pundit on Match of the Day at the end of the 2023–24 football season.
18	Speaking on BBC Radio 4's The Today Podcast, television presenter Dame Esther Rantzen, who has been diagnosed with stage four lung cancer, reveals that she has joined the Dignitas organisation and plans to "buzz off to Zurich" if her treatment does not work. Her comments reopen the debate about assisted dying in the United Kingdom.
18	Ofcom rules that GB News broke impartiality rules with an edition of The Live Desk that promoted its "Don't Kill Cash" campaign.
19	England goalkeeper Mary Earps is voted the 2023 BBC Sports Personality of the Year.
19	Mel Schilling, the dating coach on Married at First Sight, reveals that she has been diagnosed with colon cancer and will be undergoing treatment in hospital over Christmas.
20	Ofcom reveals that the edition of Dan Wootton Tonight featuring Laurence Fox's comments about journalist Ava Evans was the most complained about TV show of 2023, with 8,867 viewer complaints received by the watchdog.
22	Actor Jason Momoa becomes the latest celebrity to appear on CBeebies Bedtime Stories, reading Julia Donaldson's book Tiddler.
25	A long-running EastEnders story arc that began with a flashforward in February 2023 reaches its conclusion on Christmas Day, with the death of the character Keanu Taylor (played by Danny Walters). The original flashforward scene had shown a body lying on the floor, which is revealed to be that of Nish Panesar (Navin Chowdhry), who had been knocked unconscious, with Keanu's death revealed as a plot twist when he is stabbed by Linda Carter (Kellie Bright). The Christmas Day episode of Coronation Street (as also of Emmerdale) is just 30 minutes long.
26	Actor Chris Gascoyne makes his final appearance as the Coronation Street character Peter Barlow after two decades with the soap.
26	Overnight viewing figures for Christmas Day show the most watched programme of the day was the King's Christmas Message, with a collective audience of 7.48 million, while the BBC had nine of the top ten most watched programmes. Coronation Street and Emmerdale fail to make the top ten, but EastEnders enjoys its best audience for four years. The only programme from ITV1 to reach the top ten was The 1% Club.
28	EastEnders confirms that Alan Ford has been cast as the character Stevie Mitchell, the estranged father of Billy Mitchell (Perry Fenwick).
29	Those from the world of television to be recognised in the 2024 New Year Honours include chef Paul Hollywood (CBE), actress Emilia Clarke (MBE), broadcaster Mary Portas (OBE), Sky Sports presenter Jeff Stelling (MBE) and BBC presenter Hazel Irvine (MBE).
30	Busking duo Jen & Liv win Series 12 of The Voice.
31	BBC One ends 2023 with the concert Rick Astley Rocks New Year's Eve. Rick Astley is joined by various guests, including Rylan Clark with whom he performs a rendition of the Dead of Alive track "You Spin Me Round (Like a Record)".
31	STV's Bringing in the Bells is hosted by Alex Norton, Blythe Duff, Martin Compston and others to see in the New Year.

== Debuts ==
=== BBC ===
Date	Debut	Channel
2 January	Make It at Market	BBC One
2 January	Young MasterChef	BBC Three
14 January	Celebrity Bridge of Lies	BBC One
17 January	India: The Modi Question	BBC Two
20 January	The i-Word	BBC Two Wales
12 February	The Gold	BBC One
13 February	Better	BBC One
24 February	Beyond Paradise	BBC One
5 March	We Need to Talk About Cosby	BBC Two
12 March	Wild Isles	BBC One
21 March	Phoenix Rise	BBC Three
21 March	Anton & Giovanni's Adventures in Sicily	BBC One
26 March	Great Expectations	BBC One
27 March	Blue Lights	BBC One
31 March	A Kind of Spark	CBBC
4 April	Rain Dogs	BBC One
17 April	Dr Xand's Con or Cure	BBC One
11 April	Colin from Accounts	BBC Two
1 May	Clive Myrie's Italian Road Trip	BBC Two
5 May	Black Ops	BBC One
9 May	Turkey: Empire of Erdogan	BBC Two
13 May	I Kissed a Boy	BBC Three
14 May	Ten Pound Poms	BBC One
15 May	Steeltown Murders	BBC One
22 May	Once Upon a Time in Northern Ireland	BBC Two
31 May	The Gallows Pole	BBC Two
4 June	Spy in the Ocean	BBC One
8 June	A Wright Family Holiday	BBC One
12 June	Best Interests	BBC One
16 June	Queen of Oz	BBC One
1 July	Champion	BBC One
17 July	The Sixth Commandment	BBC One
17 July	Earth	BBC Two
24 July	Dreaming Whilst Black	BBC Three
28 July	The Power of Parker	BBC One
31 July	Wolf	BBC One
8 August	Ultimate Wedding Planner	BBC Two
15 August	Henpocalypse!	BBC Two
20 August	Boot Dreams: Now or Never	BBC Three
21 August	The Finish Line	BBC One
27 August	The Woman in the Wall	BBC One
29 August	The Following Events Are Based on a Pack of Lies	BBC One
11 September	State of Chaos	BBC Two
16 September	Alan Carr's Picture Slam	BBC One
18 September	Juice	BBC Three
20 September	Nadiya's Simple Spices	BBC Two
25 September	The Vintage French Farmhouse	BBC One
28 September	The Aftershave with Danny Beard	BBC Three
1 October	Boiling Point	BBC One
2 October	Union with David Olusoga	BBC Two
5 October	Soldier	BBC One
8 October	Big Little Journeys	BBC Two
9 October	The Reckoning	BBC One
12 October	Uncanny	BBC Two
22 October	Planet Earth III	BBC One
5 November	Liz Bonnin's Wild Caribbean	BBC Two
13 November	Grime Kids	BBC Three
14 November	Secrets of the Aquarium	BBC Two
19 November	Boat Story	BBC One
22 November	Such Brave Girls	BBC Three
25 November	Doctor Who: Unleashed	BBC Three
27 November	Julius Caesar: The Making of a Dictator	BBC Two
9 December	The Famous Five	CBBC
10 December	Killing Sherlock: Lucy Worsley on the Case of Conan Doyle	BBC Two
24 December	Lot No. 249	BBC Two
25 December	Tabby McTat	BBC One
27 December	Murder is Easy	BBC One
29 December	Men Up	BBC One
31 December	Wild Scandinavia	BBC Two

=== ITV ===
Date	Debut	Channel
2 January	Stonehouse	ITV1
5 January	A Murder in the Family	ITVX
11 January	Next Level Chef UK	ITV1
12 January	Britain's Notorious Prisons	ITV1
12 January	The Reunion	ITVX
16 January	Maternal	ITV1
17 January	The Family Pile	ITV1
26 January	Deep Fake Neighbour Wars	ITVX
2 February	Nolly	ITVX
9 February	Ghislaine Maxwell: Partner in Crime	ITVX
9 February	Cold Case Forensics	ITV1
16 February	The Twelve	ITVX
23 February	You & Me	ITVX
30 March	Six Four	ITVX
8 April	In with a Shout	ITV1
15 April	Oti Mabuse's Breakfast Show	ITV1
16 April	Laura Whitmore's Breakfast Show	ITV1
16 April	The Hunt for Raoul Moat	ITV1
23 April	Malpractice	ITV1
24 April	I'm a Celebrity... South Africa	ITV1
4 May	Tom Jones	ITVX
22 May	Maryland	ITVX
1 June	Changing Ends	ITVX
8 June	Significant Other	ITVX
15 June	Count Abdulla	ITVX
22 June	Ruby Speaking	ITVX
6 July	The Effects of Lying	ITVX
3 August	Vanishing Act	ITVX
11 September	My Mum, Your Dad	ITV1
25 September	The Long Shadow	ITV1
4 October	Payback	ITV1
22 October	Mamma Mia! I Have a Dream	ITV1
22 October	Three Little Birds	ITV1
23 November	Archie	ITVX
7 December	Platform 7	ITVX
21 December	The Winter King	ITVX

=== Channel 4 ===
Date	Debut	Channel
4 January	The Light in the Hall	Channel 4
13 January	Jon and Lucy's Odd Couples	Channel 4
23 January	Everyone Else Burns	Channel 4
7 February	Consent	Channel 4
15 February	The Piano	Channel 4
19 March	Rise and Fall	Channel 4
26 March	Tempting Fortune	Channel 4
30 March	The Dog Academy	Channel 4
31 March	Late Night Lycett	Channel 4
3 April	Strangers on a Plane	Channel 4
4 April	Naked Education	Channel 4
16 April	Scared of the Dark	Channel 4
21 April	The Big Interiors Battle	Channel 4
21 May	Depp v. Heard	Channel 4
19 June	Wonders of the World I Can't See	Channel 4
21 June	The Change	Channel 4
26 June	PopMaster TV	More4
24 July	Gregg Wallace: The British Miracle Meat	Channel 4
24 July	The Unique Boutique	Channel 4
4 August	Millionaire Hoarders	Channel 4
6 August	Alone UK	Channel 4
29 August	Selling Super Houses	Channel 4
20 September	Sex Rated	E4
3 October	Partygate	Channel 4
10 October	Don't Look Down	Channel 4
17 October	Bangers: Mad for Cars	Channel 4
12 November	Bill Bailey's Australian Adventure	Channel 4
27 November	The Couple Next Door	Channel 4
7 December	Fur Babies	Channel 4
24 December	Mog's Christmas	Channel 4

=== Channel 5 ===
Date	Debut	Channel
25 January	The Catch	Channel 5
20 February	The Challenge UK	Channel 5
5 June	For Her Sins	Channel 5
21 June	Puzzling with Lucy Worsley	Channel 5
4 July	Blindspot	Channel 5
11 July	Heat	Channel 5
4 September	The Inheritance	Channel 5
13 October	The Good Ship Murder	Channel 5
4 November	Mixmups	Channel 5
24 November	The Toy Hospital	Channel 5

=== Sky ===
Date	Debut	Channel
1 January	Romantic Getaway	Sky Comedy
4 January	Hold the Front Page	Sky Max
9 February	Funny Woman	Sky Max
24 February	Ama's Story	Sky Kids
16 March	A Town Called Malice	Sky Max
6 April	Dreamland	Sky Atlantic
7 July	Then You Run	Sky Max
5 August	Game4Ukraine	Sky Max
7 September	The Lovers	Sky Atlantic
18 September	Ready Eddie Go!	Sky Kids
November	Lockerbie	Sky Documentaries
7 December	Smothered	Sky Comedy
24 December	The Heist Before Christmas	Sky Max

=== Other channels ===
Date	Debut	Channel
6 January	The Rig	Amazon Prime Video
9 January	The Twisted Timeline of Sammy & Raj	Nicktoons
13 January	Break Point	Netflix
13 January	Slave Market	MBC 4 / MBC Action / MBC+ Variety / MBC Persia / Shahid
19 January	The Chemistry of Death	Paramount+
25 January	Extraordinary	Disney+ / Star
27 January	Lockwood & Co.	Netflix
24 February	Liaison	Apple TV+
24 February	The Reluctant Traveler	Apple TV+
28 February	The Diplomat	Alibi
1 March	Cheat	Netflix
1 March	Dirty Water	STV Player
8 March	MH370: The Plane That Disappeared	Netflix
31 March	The Power	Amazon Prime Video
5 April	The Good Mothers	Disney+ / Star
13 April	Obsession	Netflix
18 May	No Escape	Paramount+
14 June	The Full Monty	Disney+ / Star
28 June	Hijack	Apple TV+
21 July	Fifteen-Love	Amazon Prime Video
16 August	Say Yes to the Dress with Tan France	Really
16 August	At Home with the Furys	Netflix
24 August	Who Is Erin Carter?	Netflix
7 September	The Killing Kind	Paramount+
15 September	Wilderness	Amazon Prime Video
18 September	Mrs Sidhu Investigates	Acorn TV
22 September	Still Up	Apple TV+
26 September	Who Killed Jill Dando?	Netflix
5 October	Everything Now	Netflix
7 October	Nickelodeon Slimetime UK	Nickelodeon
19 October	The Burning Girls	Paramount+
19 October	Bodies	Netflix
20 October	Surviving Paradise	Netflix
8 November	The Buccaneers	Apple TV+
8 November	Culprits	Disney+ / Star
10 November	007: Road to a Million	Amazon Prime Video
22 November	Squid Game: The Challenge	Netflix
27 November	The Doll Factory	Paramount+
15 December	The Serial Killer's Wife	Paramount+
26 December	The Castaways	Paramount+
30 December	Captains of the World	Netflix

== Channels and streaming services ==
=== New channels ===
Date	Channel
5 January	That's 70s
5 January	That's 80s
5 January	That's 90s
13 February	Sky Kids
3 April	BBC News (relaunch)
24 August	Shop Extra
29 September	Ideal World (relaunch)

=== New streaming services ===
Date	Channel
22 July	ITVX Kids
22 November	Watch Free UK
22 November	True Crime UK

=== Defunct channels/streaming services ===
Date	Channel
3 April	BBC News (original)
3 April	BBC World News
27 April	Trace Hits
6 July	Ideal World (original)
7 July	TCM Movies
1 September	CITV
28 September	AMC (European TV channel)
14 December	Trace Vault
31 December	E!

=== Rebranding channels/streaming services ===
Date	Old name	New name
5 January	Great! Movies Classic	Great! Romance
6 January	Classic Hits	That's 60s
22 March	Great! Movies Action	Great! Action
17 April	All 4	Channel 4
18 July	BT Sport	TNT Sports
18 October	Pick	Sky Mix
22 November	CBS Reality	True Crime
22 November	RealityXtra	True Crime Xtra
22 November	HorrorXtra	Legend Xtra

== Television programmes ==
=== Changes of network affiliation ===
Programme	Moved from	Moved to
Bel-Air	Peacock	Sky Max
Warrior	Sky One	Sky Max
Intelligence	Sky One	Sky Max
Futurama	Sky One	Disney+
Dave	BBC Two	Disney+
Snowfall	BBC Two	Disney+
King of the Hill	Fox	Disney+
Good Trouble	BBC Three	Disney+
Neighbours	Channel 5	Amazon Freevee
Beyblade X	CITV	CBBC
Your Honor	Sky Atlantic	Paramount+
Billions	Sky Atlantic	Paramount+
Dexter	Sky Atlantic	Paramount+
Star Trek: Picard	Prime Video	Paramount+
Star Trek: Lower Decks	Prime Video	Paramount+
South Park	Comedy Central	Paramount+
Frasier	Channel 4	Paramount+
Hollyoaks	Channel 4	E4
Most Dangerous Game	Quibi	Roku Channel
The Sex Lives of College Girls	ITV2	ITVX
All American	ITV2	ITVX
Sanditon	Britbox	ITVX
Crime	Britbox	ITVX
Magpie Murders	Britbox	BBC One
Eurovision Song Contest Semi-Finals	BBC Three	BBC One
The Chris & Rosie Ramsey Show	BBC Two	BBC One
Kevin Can F**k Himself	Prime Video	AMC Global

=== Returning this year after a break of one year or longer ===
Programme	Date(s) of original removal	Original channel(s)	Date of return	New channel(s)
Happy Valley	15 March 2016	BBC One	1 January 2023	N/A (same channel as original)
Waterloo Road	9 March 2015	BBC One; BBC Three	3 January 2023	N/A (same channels as original)
Kavos Weekender	29 March 2020	ITV2	3 January 2023	N/A (same channel as original)
Michael McIntyre's Big Show	25 December 2019	BBC One	14 January 2023	N/A (same channel as original)
Challenge Anneka	15 October 1995; 6 June 2007	BBC One; ITV1	18 March 2023	Channel 5
Race Across the World	26 April 2020	BBC Two	22 March 2023	BBC One
Trooping the Colour	17 June 1939; 15 June 2019	BBC One; BBC Two	17 June 2023	N/A (same channels as original)
Classic Doctors	2005	UKTV Gold	14 August 2023	Drama
Big Brother	10 September 2010; 5 November 2018	Channel 4 Channel 5	8 October 2023	ITV2
Survivor	29 May 2002	ITV1	28 October 2023	BBC One
Deal or No Deal	23 December 2016	Channel 4	20 November 2023	ITV1
The Famous Five	8 August 1979; 16 February 1997; 27 September 2008	ITV1; CITV; Disney Channel	9 December 2023	CBBC; BBC One

== Continuing television programmes ==
=== 1920s ===
Programme	Date
BBC Wimbledon	1927–1939, 1946–2019, 2021–present

=== 1930s ===
Programme	Date
The Boat Race	1938–1939, 1946–2019, 2021–present
BBC Cricket	1939, 1946–1999, 2020–present

=== 1950s ===
Programme	Date
Panorama	1953–present
Eurovision Song Contest	1956–2019, 2021–present
The Sky at Night	1957–2023
Blue Peter	1958–present

=== 1960s ===
Programme	Date
Coronation Street	1960–present
Points of View	1961–present
Songs of Praise	1961–present
University Challenge	1962–1987, 1994–present
Doctor Who	1963–1989, 1996, 2005–present
Horizon	1964–present
Match of the Day	1964–present
Top of the Pops	1964–2006, 2006–present
Gardeners' World	1968–present
Question of Sport	1968, 1970–2023

=== 1970s ===
Programme	Date
Emmerdale	1972–present
Mastermind (including Celebrity Mastermind)	1972–1997, 2003–present
Newsround	1972–present
Football Focus	1974–1988, 1992–present
One Man and His Dog	1976–present
Ski Sunday	1978–present
Blankety Blank	1979–1990, 1997–2002, 2016, 2020–present
Antiques Roadshow	1979–present
Question Time	1979–present

=== 1980s ===
Programme	Date
Children in Need	1980–present
Countdown	1982–present
ITV Breakfast	1983–present
EastEnders	1985–present
Comic Relief	1988–present
Catchphrase	1986–2002, 2013–present
Casualty	1986–present
This Morning	1988–present
Countryfile	1988–present

=== 1990s ===
Programme	Date
Have I Got News for You	1990–present
MasterChef	1990–2001, 2005–present
ITV News Meridian	1993–2023
Top of the Pops 2	1994–present
National Television Awards	1995–2008, 2010–present
Silent Witness	1996–present
Midsomer Murders	1997–present
Classic Emmerdale	1998–2004, 2019–present
Who Wants to Be a Millionaire?	1998–2014, 2018–present
The British Soap Awards	1999–2019, 2022–2023, 2025
Loose Women	1999–present

=== 2000s ===
Programme	Date
2000
Bargain Hunt	2000–present
BBC Breakfast	2000–present
Big Brother	2000–2018, 2023–present
Click	2000–2025
Doctors	2000–2024
A Place in the Sun	2000–present
Unreported World	2000–present
2001
BBC South East Today	2001–present
Survivor	2001–2002, 2023
2002
Escape to the Country	2002–present
I'm a Celebrity...Get Me Out of Here!	2002–present
Ant & Dec's Saturday Night Takeaway	2002–2009, 2013–2018, 2020–2024
River City	2002–2026
Saturday Kitchen	2002–present
2003
Eggheads	2003–2023
Homes Under the Hammer	2003–present
2004
Match of the Day 2	2004–2025
Strictly Come Dancing	2004–present
The Big Fat Quiz of the Year	2004–present
Live at the Apollo	2004–present
Newswatch	2004–present
Strictly Come Dancing: It Takes Two	2004–present
Who Do You Think You Are?	2004–present
2005
The Apprentice	2005–2019, 2022–present
Classic Doctors	2005, 2023–present
Dragons' Den	2005–present
The Hotel Inspector	2005–present
Pocoyo	2005–present
Springwatch	2005–present
2006
The Apprentice: You're Fired!	2006–present
Dancing on Ice	2006–2014, 2018–present
Monkey Life	2006–present
Not Going Out	2006–present
The One Show	2006–present
2007
Britain's Got Talent	2007–2020, 2022–present
Would I Lie to You?	2007–present
The Graham Norton Show	2007–present
2008
An Là	2008–present
Police Interceptors	2008–present
Soccer Aid	2008, 2010, 2012, 2014, 2016, 2018–present
2009
Pointless	2009–present
The Chase	2009–present
Kate Garraway's Life Stories	2009–present

=== 2010s ===
Programme	Date
2010
The Great British Bake Off	2010–present
Great British Railway Journeys	2010–present
Lorraine	2010–present
The Only Way Is Essex	2010–present
Sunday Morning Live	2010–present
2011
Junior Bake Off	2011, 2013, 2015–2016, 2019, 2021–present
Made in Chelsea	2011–present
Death in Paradise	2011–present
24 Hours in A&E	2011–present
Scotland Tonight	2011–present
The Jonathan Ross Show	2011–present
Vera	2011–2025
2012
8 Out of 10 Cats Does Countdown	2012–present
Call the Midwife	2012–present
Stand Up To Cancer	2012–present
The Voice UK	2012–present
Tipping Point	2012–present
2013
The Dumping Ground	2013–present
Father Brown	2013–present
Two Doors Down	2013, 2016–present
2014
Agatha Raisin	2014–present
GPs: Behind Closed Doors	2014–present
Good Morning Britain	2014–present
Grantchester	2014, 2016–2017, 2019–present
STV News at Six	2014–present
The Great British Bake Off: An Extra Slice	2014–present
2015
Hunted	2015–present
SAS: Who Dares Wins	2015–present
Travel Man	2015–present
2016
Bake Off: The Professionals	2016–present
Marcella	2016–present
Naked Attraction	2016–present
Sorry, I Didn't Know	2016, 2020–present
2017
Love Island: Aftersun	2017–present
The Repair Shop	2017–present
Richard Osman's House of Games	2017–present
Strike	2017–present
2018
Peston	2018–present
2019
Glow Up: Britain's Next Make-Up Star	2019–present
The Hit List	2019–present
RuPaul's Drag Race UK	2019–present

=== 2020s ===
Programme	Date
2020
Beat the Chasers	2020–present
The Wheel	2020–present
Malory Towers	2020–present
The Masked Singer	2020–present
McDonald & Dodds	2020–2024
2021
Cooking with the Stars	2021–present
Hope Street	2021–present
2022
The 1% Club	2022–present
The Andrew Neil Show	2022–2023
Katie Price's Mucky Mansion	2022–2023
Limitless Win	2022–present
Celeb Cooking School	2022–2024
Heartstopper	2022–2026
The John Bishop Show	2022–2023
National Comedy Awards	2022–2023
Trigger Point	2022–present

== Ending this year ==
Date	Programme	Channel(s)	Debut(s)
2 January	The Papers	BBC News	2013
4 January	Stonehouse	ITV1	2023
18 January	Messy Goes to OKIDO	CBeebies	2015
27 January	Lockwood & Co.	Netflix	2023
3 February	Lingo	ITV1	1988 & 2021
5 February	His Dark Materials	BBC One	2019
5 February	Happy Valley	BBC One	2014, 2016 & 2023
16 February	The Chemistry of Death	Paramount+	2023
20 February	Maternal	ITV1	2023
21 February	You've Been Framed!	ITV1	1990
23 February	You & Me	ITVX & ITV2	2023
2 March	Next Level Chef	ITV1	2023
7 March	Kavos Weekender	ITV2	2013
12 March	Endeavour	ITV1	2012
14 March	Katie Price's Mucky Mansion	Channel 4	2022
19 March	The Gold	BBC One	2023
31 March	The Beaker Girls	CBBC	2021
8 April	Starstruck	ITV1	2022
9 April	Wild Isles	BBC One	2023
13 April	Rise and Fall	Channel 4	2023
16 April	BBC News at Nine	BBC News & BBC Two	2013
18 April	The Hunt for Raoul Moat	ITV1	2023
30 April	Great Expectations	BBC One	2023
2 May	The Architecture the Railways Built	Yesterday	2020
12 May	Unbeatable	BBC One	2021
16 May	Guilt	BBC Two	2019
22 May	Wheeler Dealers	Discovery Real Time & Discovery Channel	2003
27 May	Soccer AM	Sky Sports	1994
28 May	BT Sport Score	BT Sport	2016
4 June	Family Fortunes	ITV1	1980, 1987, 2006 & 2020
5 June	Steeltown Murders	BBC One	2023
14 June	The Gallows Pole	BBC Two	2023
19 June	Once Upon a Time in Northern Ireland	BBC Two	2023
20 June	Best Interests	BBC One	2023
9 July	Sitting on a Fortune	ITV1	2021
15 July	The Voice Kids	ITV1	2017
25 July	The Sixth Commandment	BBC One	2023
27 July	CelebAbility	ITV2	2017
15 August	Wolf	BBC One	2023
26 August	Moneyball	ITV1	2021
7 September	Top Boy	Channel 4 & Netflix	2011
8 September	A Question of Sport	BBC One	1968 & 1970
10 September	Alone UK	Channel 4	2023
19 September	Henpocalypse!	BBC Two	2023
21 September	Sex Education	Netflix	2019
24 September	The Woman in the Wall	BBC One	2023
25 September	The Inheritance	Channel 5	2023
5 October	Everything Now	Netflix	2023
17 October	The Reckoning	BBC One	2023
20 October	MOTDx	BBC Two	2019
22 October	Big Little Journeys	BBC Two	2023
22 October	Boiling Point	BBC One	2023
6 November	The Long Shadow	BBC One	2023
26 November	Handmade: Britain's Best Woodworker	Channel 4	2021
26 November	Junior Eurovision Song Contest	ITV1, ITV2, BBC One, BBC Two & CBBC	2003 & 2022
4 December	Boat Story	BBC One	2023
8 December	Steph's Packed Lunch	Channel 4	2020
10 December	Planet Earth III	BBC One	2023
11 December	Julius Caesar: The Making of a Dictator	BBC Two	2023
25 December	Ghosts	BBC One	2019
28 December	Murder is Easy	BBC One	2023
Undated	The British Soap Awards	ITV1	1999 & 2022

== Deaths ==
Date	Name	Age	Broadcast credibility
4 January	Wyllie Longmore	82	Actor (Coronation Street, Love Actually)
10 January	Shirley Dynevor	89	Actress (Charlesworth, Rogue Male, The Wednesday Play)
11 January	Piers Haggard	83	Television director (Pennies from Heaven, Play for Today, Thirty-Minute Theatre, Quatermass)
15 January	Bruce Gowers	82	Television director (American Idol)
27 January	Sylvia Syms	89	Actress (Peak Practice, EastEnders, Thatcher: The Final Days)
10 February	Hugh Hudson	86	Director (Chariots of Fire)
13 February	Zia Mohyeddin	91	British-Pakistani actor (Lawrence of Arabia, Immaculate Conception).
14 February	Christine Pritchard	79	Actress (Pobol y Cwm, Cara Fi)
17 February	Lee Whitlock	54	Actor (Shine on Harvey Moon, Casualty, Grange Hill, London's Burning, The Bill)
19 February	Dickie Davies	94	Television presenter (World of Sport)
23 February	John Motson	77	Football commentator (BBC Sport)
5 March	Bob Goody	71	Actor and screenwriter (Smith and Goody, The Blackheath Poisonings, Blue Heaven)
9 March	Mystic Meg	80	Astrologer (The National Lottery Draws)
11 March	Bill Tidy	89	Television personality (Countdown, Countryfile)
23 March	Dafydd Hywel	77	Actor (We Are Seven, Stella, Pobol y Cwm, Keeping Faith/Un Bore Mercher)
24 March	Christopher Gunning	78	Theme tune composer (Agatha Christie's Poirot, Middlemarch)
28 March	Paul O'Grady	67	Comedian and television presenter (Blankety Blank, The Paul O'Grady Show, Paul O'Grady: For the Love of Dogs, Blind Date)
6 April	Paul Cattermole	46	Singer (S Club 7) and actor (Miami 7, L.A.7)
6 April	Nicola Heywood-Thomas	67	News presenter and broadcaster (HTV News, BBC Wales Today)
8 April	Judith Miller	71	Television presenter (Antiques Roadshow)
14 April	Murray Melvin	90	Actor (The Avengers, Torchwood)
19 April	Peter Martin	81	Actor (The Royle Family, Emmerdale)
21 April	Kate Saunders	62	Actress and journalist (Angels, Only Fools and Horses, Have I Got News for You)
22 April	Len Goodman	78	Ballroom dancer and judge (Strictly Come Dancing, Dancing with the Stars)
22 April	Barry Humphries	89	Comedian, actor and author (Dame Edna Everage, Bedazzled, Finding Nemo)
27 April	Jerry Springer	79	British-born American talk show presenter (The Springer Show, Jerry Springer)
27 April	Barbara Young	92	Actress (Coronation Street, I, Claudius, Last of the Summer Wine, Family Affairs)
8 May	Terrence Hardiman	86	Actor (Crown Court, Secret Army, The Demon Headmaster)
10 May	Rolf Harris	93	Australian-born television entertainer (Animal Hospital, Rolf's Cartoon Club, Rolf Harris Cartoon Time)
13 May	Frankie Jules-Hough	38	Actress (Hollyoaks)
21 May	Ray Stevenson	58	Actor (Rome, Black Sails, Vikings, Ahsoka)
26 May	Emily Morgan	45	Journalist (ITV News)
31 May	Patricia Dainton	93	Actress (Sixpenny Corner)
8 June	Kerri-Anne Donaldson	38	Dancer and choreographer (Britain's Got Talent, The Masked Singer)
15 June	Glenda Jackson	87	Actress (Z-Cars, Elizabeth R, Elizabeth Is Missing)
16 June	Angela Thorne	84	Actress (To the Manor Born, Three Up, Two Down)
16 June	Paxton Whitehead	85	Actor (Friends, Mad About You)
1 July	Meg Johnson	86	Actress (Emmerdale, Brookside, Coronation Street)
7 July	Yvonne Littlewood	95	Television producer and director (Eurovision Song Contest 1963)
11 July	George Armstrong	60	Actor (Grange Hill, Tucker's Luck)
12 July	John Nettleton	94	Actor (Yes Minister, The New Statesman)
14 July	Tony Butler	88	Broadcaster (BBC Midlands Today)
16 July	Jane Birkin	76	British-French actress, singer and fashion designer
19 July	Anita Carey	75	Actress (Coronation Street, Doctors)
19 July	Mark Thomas	67	Theme tune composer (Episodes)
24 July	George Alagiah	67	Newsreader (BBC News at Six)
28 July	Jim Parker	88	Theme tune composer (Mapp & Lucia, House of Cards, The House of Eliott, Moll Flanders, Ground Force, Changing Rooms, Midsomer Murders)
2 August	Tom Kempinski	85	Actor (Dixon of Dock Green, Z-Cars)
3 August	Carl Davis	86	American-born British theme tune composer (Pride and Prejudice)
9 August	Doreen Mantle	97	Actress (One Foot in the Grave, Coronation Street, Doctors)
August (Reported on 10 August)	Simon Carlyle	48	Writer (Two Doors Down)
13 August	Patricia Bredin	88	Singer and actress (represented the United Kingdom at the Eurovision Song Contest 1957)
16 August	Sir Michael Parkinson	88	Television and radio presenter (Parkinson, Give Us a Clue, Desert Island Discs, Going for a Song)
August (Reported on 21 August)	Robert Alun Evans	86	Sports reporter and presenter (Heddiw)
5 September	John Stevenson	86	Screenwriter (Brass, Coronation Street)
6 September	John Cairney	93	Actor (This Man Craig, Scotch on the Rocks)
8 September	Mike Yarwood	82	Comedian and impressionist
12 September	Jean Boht	91	Actress (Bread, I Woke Up One Morning, The Brighton Belles, Boys from the Blackstuff)
13 September	Maddy Anholt	35	Comedian, actor and author
23 September (Reported on 10 October 2024)	Cheryl Murray	71	Actress (Coronation Street, Hi-de-Hi!, Sorry!)
25 September	David McCallum	90	Actor (The Man from U.N.C.L.E., NCIS) and musician
28 September	Sir Michael Gambon	82	Actor (Faith, Longitude, Maigret, Perfect Strangers, The Singing Detective, Wives and Daughters)
1 October	Jake Abraham	56	British actor (Blonde Fist, Lock, Stock and Two Smoking Barrels, The 51st State)
7 October	Terence Davies	77	Screenwriter, director and novelist
19 October	Alan J. W. Bell	85	Television producer and director (Last of the Summer Wine, Ripping Yarns, The Hitchhiker's Guide to the Galaxy)
20 October	Haydn Gwynne	66	Actress (Drop the Dead Donkey, The Windsors, Peak Practice, Merseybeat)
22 October	Dave Courtney	64	Gangster, actor and author
23 October	Bill Kenwright	78	Actor (Coronation Street) and judge (Any Dream Will Do)
29 October	Trevor Hill	98	British radio and television producer (Children's Hour, Round Britain Quiz, Sooty), director and writer
9 November	Tim Woodward	70	Actor (Wings, Piece of Cake, Agatha Christie's Poirot, Murder City)
19 November	Joss Ackland	95	Actor (White Mischief, Lethal Weapon 2, The Mighty Ducks)
20 November	Annabel Giles	64	Actress (Firelight) and psychotherapist
23 November	Russell Norman	57	Restaurateur and chef (Saturday Kitchen)
29 November	Dean Sullivan	68	Actor (Brookside)
30 November	Sophie Anderson	36	Pornographic actress and internet personality (Slag Wars: The Next Destroyer)
30 November	John Byrne	83	Scottish playwright (The Slab Boys Trilogy, Tutti Frutti, Your Cheatin' Heart) and designer
1 December	Brigit Forsyth	83	Scottish actress (Whatever Happened to the Likely Lads?, Boon, Still Open All Hours)
7 December	Benjamin Zephaniah	65	Actor (The Bill, EastEnders, Peaky Blinders) and poet
11 December	Shirley Anne Field	87	English actress (The Entertainer, The Damned, Alfie)
15 December	Steve Halliwell	77	Actor (Emmerdale, Heartbeat, Coronation Street)
22 December	Ian Pepperell	53	Actor (EastEnders)
24 December	David Leland	82	Television director (Band of Brothers, The Borgias)
25 December	Richard Franklin	87	Actor (Doctor Who, Emmerdale)
25 December	Henry Sandon	95	Antiques expert (Antiques Roadshow)
30 December	Tom Wilkinson	75	Actor (Inspector Morse, Screen Two, Prime Suspect, Belgravia)
