= Pasgianos =

Sudanese carbonated soft drink

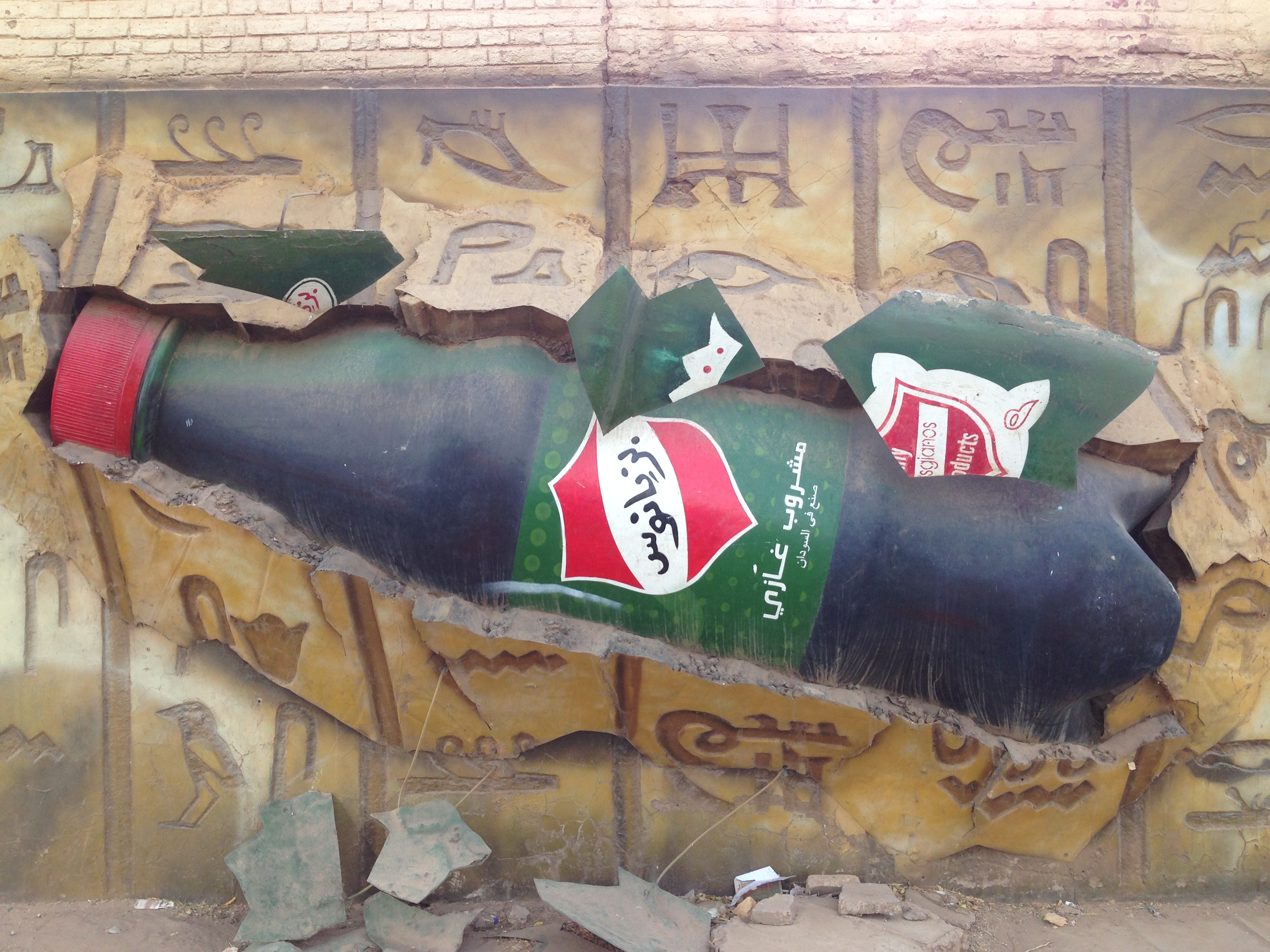
- Mural advertisement for the Pasgianos soft drink at the Greek Club in Khartoum, Sudan
- Type: Soft drink
- Manufacturer: Haggar Group (since 1999); Pasgianos Food & Beverages (1920s–1999)
- Origin: Sudan, Sudan; also distributed in regional markets including the GCC and Egypt
- Introduced: 1920s
- Colour: Dark red
- Flavour: Sweet fruit flavour with notes described as cinnamon and liquorice
- Ingredients: Undisclosed proprietary formula
- Variants: Frutto; orange
- Website: haggar-pfb.com

Pasgianos (Arabic: بزيانوس) is a Sudanese carbonated soft drink that is manufactured by Haggar Group. The drink is known for its dark red colour, sweet fruit flavour and aromatic notes that have been compared to cinnamon and liquorice.

== History ==
Pasgianos is named after George Dmitri Pasgianos, a Greek merchant who settled in Sudan during the Anglo-Egyptian Sudan period. According to a 2014 feature by The World, Pasgianos experimented with fizzy drinks for the Sudanese market, including lemon and ginger-lemon flavours, before creating the drink that carried his name.

The Haggar Group, which later acquired the brand, states that Pasgianos Food & Beverages was established in the 1920s and became the first soft drink bottled in Sudan. The company says that it acquired the brand in 1999 and invested in expanding its production capacity.

In 2014, The World reported from the Pasgianos factory in Khartoum North and stated that the factory was producing 55,000 bottles an hour. Haggar Group states that Pasgianos is now bottled in both the United Arab Emirates and Egypt and distributed across regional markets.

== Flavour and cultural significance ==
The drink has been described as dark red and very sweet, with a fruity flavour and hints of cinnamon and liquorice. Its exact formula has not been publicly disclosed. In 2014, a Pasgianos operations manager in Khartoum told The World that the ingredients responsible for the flavour were a trade secret.

Pasgianos has been described as a nostalgic Sudanese drink. Rushaa Hamid, writing for 500 Words Magazine, described it as a classic childhood drink and discussed it as part of the legacy of the Greek-Sudanese community. A Goethe-Institut Sudan cultural project also referred to Pasgianos as a fizzy drink created through the combination of Greek techniques and Sudanese ingredients.

Leila Aboulela, the award-winning Sudanese writer, has immortalised Pasgianos in her book stating:

The bottle was warm and I drank it all in one go

— Leila Aboulela, The Kindness of Enemies

== See also ==
- Sudanese cuisine
