= All Arms Commando Course =

British military training course

Commando dagger badge

The All Arms Commando Course (AACC) lasts for 16 weeks and is run by the Royal Marines at the Commando Training Centre Royal Marines (CTCRM), Lympstone. Members from any of the United Kingdom's Regular Armed Forces (e.g. personnel from units attached to the Marines) and overseas exchange personnel can attend to serve with UK Commando Force (UKCF). On completion of the course the successful candidate earns the right to wear the green beret, and to wear the "commando dagger" on their uniform. The Royal Marines expect that nearly half of the volunteers will drop out or be dismissed before completing the AACC. The primary aim of the course is to give service personnel the core military skills necessary for Extremely and Very High readiness Commando and Littoral Strike operations.

== History ==
The first formal commando training course was established at Achnacarry in 1942 and some elements remain the same, such as the "rope regain" and the "Tarzan course", designed to test the courage, agility and determination of candidates. Others have changed in times and distances, such as speed-marching and the endurance course. The basis of the commando ethos can be summed as unity (unselfishness), adaptability, humility (as in non-arrogance), high professional standards, fortitude and humour (cheerfulness in the face of adversity).

Since the Second World War, all the Army Commando units have been disbanded leaving the Royal Marines Commandos to carry on the tradition. Nevertheless, these commando units are supported by a variety of non Royal Marines personnel. In the year 2000, over 1,000 British Army soldiers wore the green beret and supported 3 Commando Brigade. About 30 per cent of UK Commando Force, performing vital support roles, were not Royal Marines in 2004, such as 29 Commando Regiment Royal Artillery and 24 Commando Regiment Royal Engineers.

The course is open to both men and women. In 2002 Major Philippa Tattersall of the Adjutant General's Corps became the first woman to successfully complete it.

== Course aims ==
To prepare Navy, Army or Air Force personnel for service with 3 Cdo Bde RM (now UK Commando Force) by developing the temperament, mental resolve, physical robustness and core military skills necessary in the demanding environment of expeditionary and littoral operations

— All Arms Commando

== Course content ==
Volunteers attend a 4-week preparation course, prior to the AACC, which brings them from a broad range of backgrounds up to a common standard of basic skills and fitness needed to start the AACC. The AACC is for trained military ranks only and is not open to new recruits outside the Royal Marines (all Royal Marines, with the exception of members of the Royal Marines Band Service, are trained as commandos). Core military skills are covered during the AACC, including fieldcraft, tactics, patrolling, defence and section and troop level attacks, troop weapons, signals, map reading, navigation, first aid, health, hygiene and physical training. The course then covers the following Commando skills: amphibious assault drills, cliff assault drills, helicopter drills and small-unit tactics. The course concludes with a week-long confirmatory test exercise followed by "Test Week". There is no specific age limit for the AACC itself, as it's intended for serving individuals. However, there are age restrictions for the Royal Marines, as they have a recruitment age limit of 16–32.

== Tests ==
=== During the course ===
The following tests must be passed by the volunteers:

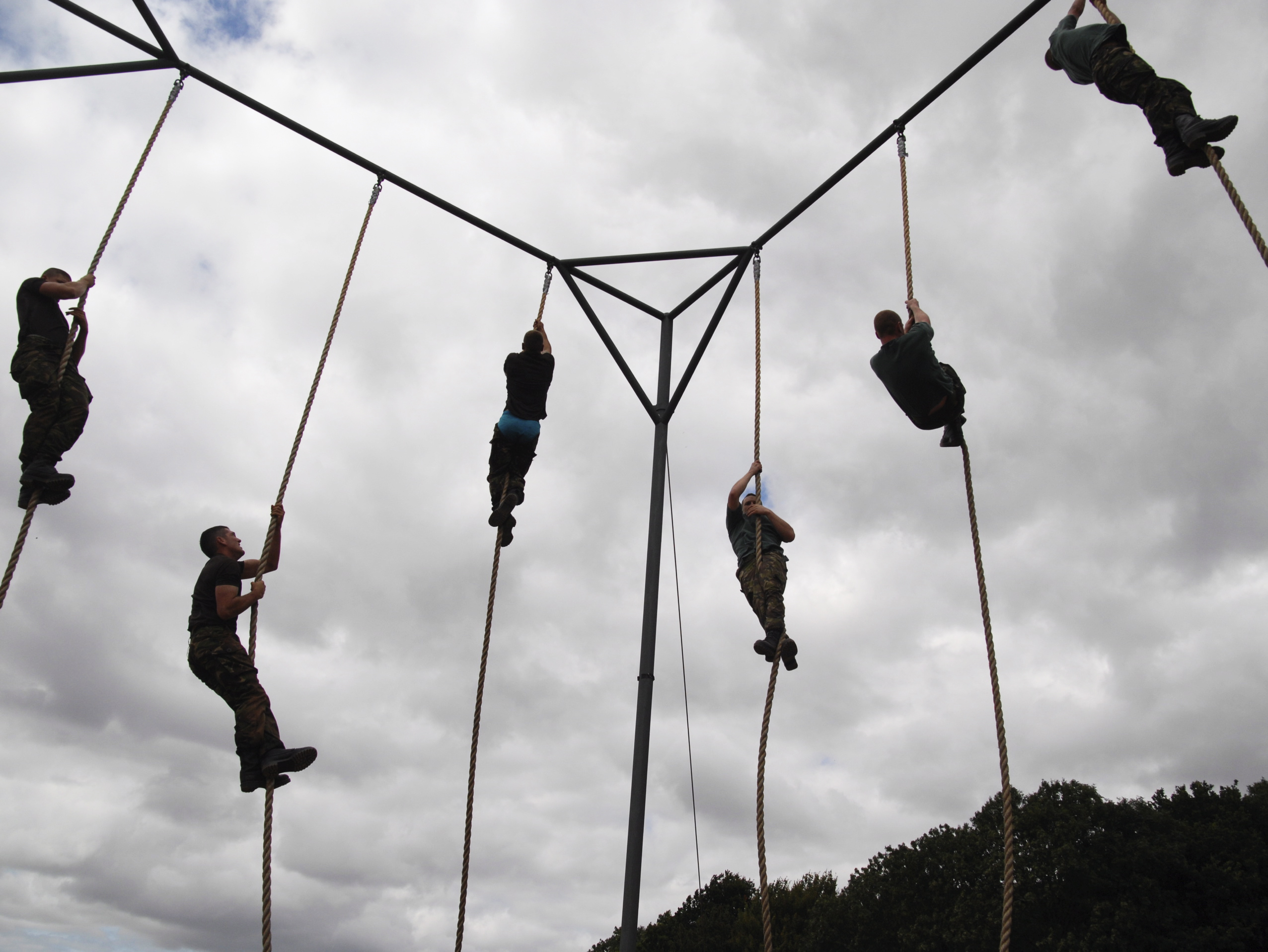
Rope climbing

Wearing boots, trousers and smock, carrying fighting order and personal weapon:

- 30 ft (9.1 m) rope climb
- Bottom Field assault course in under 5 minutes
- Fireman's carry, over 200m carrying own and colleague's equipment and weapon (combined weight of 62 lb (28 kg)), in 90 seconds
- Full regain, over a tank filled with water as protection from falling. Candidates do a Tyrolean traverse using no technical climbing equipment, only using skill and strength to cross along the rope strung between two towers. The technique is to balance the torso on the top of the rope whilst pushing across using an ankle from one leg hooked over the rope and using the other leg as balance. During the traverse candidates are required to halt the traverse and to hang by hands from the rope. Candidates then have to "regain" the traverse position on top of the rope; this move requires both technique and strength.
- 12-mile (19 km) load carry – at night, as a formed body carrying 69 lb (31 kg) marching order and personal weapon within 4 hours. A formed body is a group route-marching in rough rank and file with no specific pace or step length.

=== Commando tests ===
Completed on consecutive days during the final test week:

Endurance course. This is an individual test comprising a challenging 6-mile (9.65 km) course whilst carrying 21 lb (9.5 kilograms (kg)) fighting order and personal weapon. The first two miles consist of undulating woodland terrain featuring obstacles such as tunnels, pipes, wading pools and an underwater culvert. The latter four miles (6.43 km) remain an obstacle-free metalled road return run back to CTCRM. Candidates are to complete this in 73 minutes. This is followed by a marksmanship test where the candidate must hit 6 out of 10 shots at a target simulating a man at a range of 200 metres.

9-mile speed march. This is a 9-mile (14 km) speed march, as a formed body, which is to be completed in 90 minutes (at an average pace of 6 miles per hour (mph)) whilst carrying fighting order and personal weapon.

Tarzan assault course. Starting at 1-minute intervals on the Cdo slide (a zip line), this is an individual test that commences with a number of "high aerial apparatuses" followed immediately by the "bottom field assault course", and then finishing with a rope climb up a 30-foot (ft) near-vertical wall. It must be completed whilst carrying fighting order and personal weapon in 13 minutes.

30-miler. This is a tactical navigation endurance march to be completed as a syndicate whilst carrying personal load carry equipment, weapon, spare clothing and rations. Candidates must achieve this in 8 hours.

Retests. If a candidate fails a commando test, then they will get an opportunity to retake it again in the four-day window that follows the 30-miler. If a candidate fails two or more of the tests, it is unlikely that a chance to re-attempt them will be offered.

== Reserve Forces Commando Course ==
There is also a Reserve forces commando course run for members of the Royal Marines Reserve and Commando units of the Army Reserve. The tests are the same as for the AACC above.

It differs from the AACC in the format of the build up training, Reserve volunteers must train themselves to pass the physically arduous tests in their own time and be available at weekends to develop their infantry skills. This typically requires a commitment of one weekend a month for a period of 9 to 18 months, depending on which sub-unit the volunteer is part of.

The Army Reserve was previously known as the Territorial Army (TA).
