= Philippa Tattersall =

British female commando

- Born: 1975 (age 50–51); London, UK
- Known for: First woman to complete the All Arms Commando Course

Philippa "Pip" Joan Angel Delamere-Wright (née Tattersall; born 1975) is an English former army officer. She was the first woman to succeed in the nine-week All Arms Commando Course, joining the main manoeuvre formation, 3 Commando Brigade.

Tattersall was born in London, and moved to Aberdeenshire when she was two after her father got an engineering job in the Scottish oil industry. She attended to Roedean School in East Sussex, then took on a temporary Army commission in order to have a bursary for studying sports science at Chester College, before subsequently undergoing officer training at RMA Sandhurst. Following her training, she taught for six months in a Kosovan school.

Tattersall successfully completed the Commando Course in May 2002 after two previous failed attempts. She served in the Educational and Training Services Branch of the Adjutant General's Corps.

Tattersall swam the English Channel in 2006 and won a silver medal in the 2009 British Snowboarding championships, as well as being a runner in the 2008 CaniX Championship and the 2009 London Marathon. In 2023, Tattersall was a contestant on Alone UK, by which point she was a mother of two and working as a wild swimming coach and outdoor instructor.
