= Alone UK =

- Genre: Reality
- Narrated by: Tony Hirst
- Composer: Wayne Roberts
- Country of origin: United Kingdom
- Original language: English
- No. of series: 1
- No. of episodes: 6

Production
- Running time: 60 minutes (inc. adverts)
- Production company: The Garden

Original release
- Network: Channel 4
- Release: 6 August – 10 September 2023

Related
- Alone

Alone UK is a British survival reality television competition show based on the original U.S. show of the same name and has aired on Channel 4 from 6 August to 10 September 2023.

It follows the self-documented daily struggles of 11 individuals as they survive alone in Canadian wilderness for as long as possible using a limited amount of survival equipment. The participants are isolated from each other and all other humans, with the participants having to self-document and film their experiences themselves. They may "tap out" at any time or be removed due to failing a medical check-in. The contestant who remains the longest wins a grand prize of £100,000.

On 17 April 2024, Channel 4 confirmed the cancellation of the programme after airing just one series.

== Reception ==
The second episode debuted on Channel 4's catch-up service straight after the first episode aired on television and received 40.3 million streaming minutes by the end of 2023.

== Episodes ==
No.	Title	Original release date
1	"Episode 1"	6 August 2023
2	"Episode 2"	13 August 2023
3	"Episode 3"	20 August 2023
4	"Episode 4"	27 August 2023
5	"Episode 5"	3 September 2023
6	"Episode 6"	10 September 2023

== Results ==
Name	Age	Residence	Occupation	Status	Reason they tapped out	Ref.
Tom Williams	39	Portsmouth	Expedition Company Director	Winner - 34 days	N/A	
Elise Wortley	32	London	PR Executive	32 days	Lack of food	
Naomi Aldwyn‑Allsworth	26	London	Clothing Designer	31 days	Missed family	
Alan Bale	43	Birmingham	Woodland Manager	28 days	Lack of food	
Eva Outram	25	Leeds	NHS Project Manager	23 days	Isolation and past trauma	
Javed Bhatti	58	Ripon	Business Coach & Mentor	23 days	Lack of food	
Louie Seddon	28	Wallasey	Builder	17 days	Missed family	
Pip Delamere-Wright	47	Tarland, Scotland	Wild Swimming Coach	15 days	Missed family	
Laura Try	40	Stamford	Entrepreneur	8 days	Felt sad	
Kian Baig	19	London	War Studies Student	3 days	Fear of bears	
Mike	49	Manchester	Joiner & Master Craftsman	1 day (medically evacuated)	Axe injury to leg	
