= Turkey: Empire of Erdogan =

2023 British documentary TV series

- Narrated by: David Morrissey
- Country of origin: United Kingdom
- Original language: English
- No. of episodes: 2

Original release
- Network: BBC Two
- Release: 23 May 2023

Turkey: Empire of Erdogan is a 2023 two-part documentary series aired by BBC Two before the 2023 Turkish general election. It explores the 20-year political career of President of Turkey Recep Tayyip Erdoğan, and the impact on Turkey. Events covered include the Gezi Park protests and the Susurluk car crash. The two episodes were narrated by David Morrissey.

== See also ==
- India: The Modi Question
