= University Challenge 2022–23 =

Season of a television programme

The 52nd series of University Challenge began on 29 August 2022 on BBC Two. A special programme commemorating the show's 60th anniversary was broadcast on the same night.

This was the final series hosted by Jeremy Paxman, who then stood down from the role after 29 years. From July 2023 onwards, Amol Rajan succeeded Paxman as host for the 53rd series of the long-running student quiz show.

Paxman’s last-ever appearance as host aired on 29 May 2023 at the end of the series, when the University of Durham won their third title by defeating the University of Bristol in the final, which was coincidentally a rematch of the very first game back in August.

In this series, the universities of Coventry and Roehampton made their debut appearances, while Robert Gordon University made only their second appearance since 1994 in Jeremy Paxman's inaugural series.

== Results ==
- Winning teams are highlighted in **bold**.
- Teams with green scores (winners) returned in the next round, while those with red scores (losers) were eliminated (as it was impossible for them to be in the highest scoring losers).
- Teams with orange scores had to win one more match to return in the next round.
- Teams with yellow scores indicate that two further matches had to be played and won (teams that lost their first quarter-final match).
- A score in italics indicates a match decided on a tie-breaker question.

=== First round ===
Team 1	Score		Team 2	Total	Broadcast date
University of Bristol	185	195	**Durham University**	380	29 August 2022
The Open University	115	195	**Newcastle University**	310	5 September 2022
London School of Economics	110	175	**University College, Oxford**	285	12 September 2022
Coventry University	50	230	**Cardiff University**	280	19 September 2022
Cranfield University	110	155	**Royal Holloway, University of London**	265	26 September 2022
University of Glasgow	105	165	**Queen's University Belfast**	270	3 October 2022
Gonville and Caius College, Cambridge	120	140	**University of St Andrews**	260	10 October 2022
University of Sheffield	170	180	**University College London**	350	17 October 2022
Oriel College, Oxford	130	150	**Christ's College, Cambridge**	280	25 October 2022
**Jesus College, Cambridge**	225	105	St Catherine's College, Oxford	330	1 November 2022
Balliol College, Oxford	115	210	**University of Southampton**	325	8 November 2022
**Bangor University**	135	125	University of Nottingham	260	15 November 2022
Newnham College, Cambridge	160	175	**The Courtauld Institute of Art**	335	21 November 2022
**Robert Gordon University**	210	90	University of Roehampton	300	28 November 2022

==== Highest scoring losers play-offs ====
Team 1	Score		Team 2	Total	Broadcast date
University of Sheffield	110	175	**Newnham College, Cambridge**	285	5 December 2022
**University of Bristol**	185	150	Oriel College, Oxford	335	12 December 2022

=== Second round ===
Team 1	Score		Team 2	Total	Broadcast date
University of St Andrews	90	145	**Royal Holloway, University of London**	235	2 January 2023
**Robert Gordon University**	180	75	The Courtauld Institute of Art	255	9 January 2023
**Newnham College, Cambridge**	150	140	Cardiff University	290	16 January 2023
**University of Bristol**	205	90	Queen's University Belfast	295	23 January 2023
University College, Oxford	85	160	**Jesus College, Cambridge**	245	30 January 2023
**University College London**	180	170	Newcastle University	350	6 February 2023
Christ's College, Cambridge	90	175	**University of Southampton**	265	13 February 2023
**Durham University**	240	35	Bangor University	275	20 February 2023

=== Quarter-finals ===
Team 1	Score		Team 2	Total	Broadcast date
University of Southampton	135	165	**Durham University**	300	27 February 2023
**Royal Holloway, University of London**	170	85	Robert Gordon University	255	6 March 2023
Newnham College, Cambridge	110	205	**University of Bristol**	315	13 March 2023
Jesus College, Cambridge	115	185	**University College London**	300	20 March 2023
Durham University	100	125	**Royal Holloway, University of London**	225	27 March 2023
**University of Southampton**	180	65	Robert Gordon University	245	3 April 2023
**University of Bristol**	205	70	University College London	275	10 April 2023
**Newnham College, Cambridge**	215	115	Jesus College, Cambridge	330	17 April 2023
**Durham University**	160	145	University College London	305	24 April 2023
Newnham College, Cambridge	120	135	**University of Southampton**	255	8 May 2023

=== Semi-finals ===
Team 1	Score		Team 2	Total	Broadcast date
Royal Holloway, University of London	90	160	**Durham University**	250	15 May 2023
**University of Bristol**	200	70	University of Southampton	270	22 May 2023

This was the first time since the 2006-07 series that there were no Oxbridge teams in the semi-finals.

=== Final ===
Team 1	Score		Team 2	Total	Broadcast date
**Durham University**	155	120	University of Bristol	275	29 May 2023

- The trophy and title were awarded to the Durham team of Harry Scully, Chloe Margaux, Alex Radcliffe, and Bea Bennett, who beat the Bristol team of Sam Kehler, Jacob McLaughlin, Tess Richardson, and Alejandro Ortega.
- The trophy was presented by Jung Chang.
- This was the last regular series to be hosted by Jeremy Paxman after 29 years.

== Spin-off: Christmas Special 2022 ==
=== First round ===
Each year, a Christmas special sequence is aired featuring distinguished alumni. Out of 7 first-round winners, the top 4 highest-scoring teams progress to the semi-finals. The teams consist of celebrities who represent their alma maters. This was the last Christmas special to be hosted by Jeremy Paxman after 11 years.

- Winning teams are highlighted in **bold**.
- Teams with green scores (winners) returned in the next round, while those with red scores (losers) were eliminated.
- Teams with grey scores won their match but did not achieve a high enough score to proceed to the next round.
- A score in italics indicates a match decided on a tie-breaker question.

Team 1	Score		Team 2	Total	Broadcast date
SOAS University of London	75	155	**Balliol College, Oxford**	230	19 December 2022
University College, Oxford	75	110	**University of Glasgow**	185	20 December 2022
Durham University	45	200	**University of York**	245	21 December 2022
**Exeter College, Oxford**	150	70	Queen Mary University of London	220	22 December 2022
**University of Hull**	135	35	University of the West of England	170	23 December 2022
University College London	85	115	**University of Aberdeen**	200	26 December 2022
**University of Bristol**	125	105	Cardiff University	230	27 December 2022

==== Standings for the winners ====
Rank	Team	Team captain	Score
1	University of York	Tom Scott	200
2	Balliol College, Oxford	Martin Edwards	155
3	Exeter College, Oxford	Reeta Chakrabarti	150
4	University of Hull	Sian Reese-Williams	135
5	University of Bristol	Dominic Waghorn	125
6	University of Aberdeen	Jon S. Baird	115
7	University of Glasgow	Chris Brookmyre	110

=== Semi-finals ===
Team 1	Score		Team 2	Total	Broadcast date
University of York	100	155	**University of Hull**	255	28 December 2022
**Balliol College, Oxford**	215	125	Exeter College, Oxford	340	29 December 2022

=== Final ===
Team 1	Score		Team 2	Total	Broadcast date
University of Hull	70	165	**Balliol College, Oxford**	235	30 December 2022

The winning Balliol College, Oxford team consisted of Elizabeth Kiss, Andrew Copson, Martin Edwards and Martin O’Neill, who beat the University of Hull and their team of Katharine Norbury, James Graham (Note: As the opening weekend of Graham's musical Tammy Faye clashed with the recording of the Final, Sarah Peverley took his place.), Sian Reese-Williams and Graeme Hall.
