= Captains of the World =

British documentary television series

- Promotional poster showing Lionel Messi with the FIFA World Cup Trophy
- Genre: Docudrama
- Starring: Lionel Messi; Kylian Mbappé; Harry Kane; Neymar; Luka Modrić; Thiago Silva; Cristiano Ronaldo; Gary Lineker
- Country of origin: United Kingdom
- Original languages: English; Arabic; Croatian; Danish; Dutch; French; German; Italian; Japanese; Persian; Portuguese; Spanish (Note: With a few dialogue in Korean and Welsh.)
- No. of seasons: 1
- No. of episodes: 6

Production
- Executive producers: Ben Turner; Gabe Turner
- Producers: Christian Cerami; Neil Housley
- Production location: Qatar
- Cinematography: Diego Rodriguez
- Running time: 41–55 minutes
- Production companies: Fulwell 73; FIFA+

Original release
- Network: Netflix
- Release: 30 December 2023

Captains of the World is a television documentary series produced in a collaboration between Netflix, Fulwell 73 and FIFA+ to give a behind-the-scenes look at the 2022 FIFA World Cup. It is a follow-up to the 2022 co-produced series Captains, which documented players' efforts as their teams fought to qualify for the highly anticipated sporting event that took place in Qatar.

The documentary features behind-the-scenes footage and exclusive interviews with captains, prominent players, coaches and more – including Harry Kane, Gareth Bale, Lionel Messi, Cristiano Ronaldo, Kylian Mbappé and Simon Kjær; and revisits the tragedies and triumphs of the 2022 FIFA World Cup. From Messi's records with Argentina's big win to the biggest upsets of players like Ronaldo, Harry Kane and Thiago Silva, the story covers every angle of the journey.

== Cast ==
- Lionel Messi
- Kylian Mbappé
- Harry Kane
- Neymar
- Luka Modrić
- Thiago Silva
- Cristiano Ronaldo
- Kalidou Koulibaly
- Tyler Adams
- Gareth Bale
- Simon Kjær
- Romain Saïss
- Gary Lineker
- Lionel Scaloni
- Didier Deschamps
- Louis van Gaal

== Episodes ==
No. in series	Title	Featured matches	Original release date
1	"Great Expectations"	Brazil 2–0 Serbia; Argentina 1–2 Saudi Arabia; Portugal 3–2 Ghana; United States 1–1 Wales	30 December 2023
Messi remembers Maradona, Thiago Silva recalls his battle with tuberculosis and Tyler Adams tries to change the world's view of football in America.
2	"Where Is Messi?"	Denmark 0–0 Tunisia; Qatar 1–3 Senegal; France 2–1 Denmark; Argentina 2–0 Mexico; Australia 1–0 Denmark; Ecuador 1–2 Senegal	30 December 2023
Simon Kjær discusses Kylian Mbappé's star power and the politics of playing in Qatar. Kalidou Koulibaly reflects on African solidarity at the Cup.
3	"Against All Odds"	Japan 2–1 Spain; Costa Rica 2–4 Germany; Wales 0–2 Iran; Iran 0–1 United States; Argentina 2–1 Australia; Japan 1–1 (1–3 pen.) Croatia; Morocco 0–0 (3–0 pen.) Spain; Brazil 4–1 South Korea	30 December 2023
The Round of 16 looms large. Australia aims to take out a god; Maya Yoshida tries to rewrite Japan's legacy in the knockout stage; Morocco makes history.
4	"The Harder They Fall"	Croatia 1–1 (4–2 pen.) Brazil; Morocco 1–0 Portugal	30 December 2023
Friction finds Ronaldo benched; Silva braces for backlash when Croatia eliminates Brazil; Morocco captain Romain Saïss discusses the energy in Qatar.
5	"Mind Games"	England 1–2 France; Netherlands 2–2 (3–4 pen.) Argentina (Battle of Lusail); Argentina 3–0 Croatia; France 2–0 Morocco	30 December 2023
Club friends turn to foes as France faces England; Argentina reopens old wounds for the Netherlands; Luka Modrić's Cup career comes to a close.
6	"The Greatest"	Argentina 3–3 (4–2 pen.) France (2022 FIFA World Cup final)	30 December 2023
With half of the world's population watching and his legacy on the line, Messi takes on Mbappé and France in a final, epic clash of football titans.

== Reception ==
For the first season, the review aggregator website Rotten Tomatoes reported a 98% approval rating . In the first week of its release, it ranked as the 4th most watched TV show worldwide with 348M hours watched, and ended the first week in Netflix's Top 10 list in over 89 countries.
