= The Sudanist =

Sudanese online publication, from 2012

- Editor-in-Chief: Ola Diab
- Writers: Omnia Shawkat; Leena Badri; Samar Bengawi; Thuraya Salih; Moayad Mutwalli; Ola Khalil; Muathal Hisham
- Format: Online
- Founder: Moez Ali; Mohamed Mahmoud; Ola Diab
- Founded: 1 June 2012; 13 years ago
- Country: Sudan; South Sudan
- Language: English
- Website: thesudanist.com//

The Sudanist, previously known as 500 Words Magazine, is a non-profit independent online publication that provides coverage on a variety of topics related to Sudan and South Sudan. The magazine features articles on arts and culture, society, science and technology, business and economy, and more. The magazine's mission is to present in-depth stories about Sudan and South Sudan in 500 words or more.

The magazine was founded by Moez Ali and Mohamed Mahmoud on 1 June 2012, but relaunched on 1 October 2018 by Ola Diab.
