= Kiir =

Kiir is a surname of multiple origins. Notable people with the surname include:

- Adut Salva Kiir, South Sudanese politician
- Avo Kiir (born 1952), Estonian Lutheran clergyman and politician
- Mayan Kiir (born 1998), South Sudanese-American professional basketball player
- Philip Akot Akok Kiir (born 1937), South Sudanese pastor, former educator, and politician
- Salva Kiir (born 1951), President of South Sudan
- Sylvester Madut Abraham Ayuel Kiir (born 1933), South Sudanese educationist

== Fictional characters ==
- Georg Adniel Kiir, in several Estonian films, played by Margus Lepa
