= Adut Salva Kiir =

South Sudanese politician

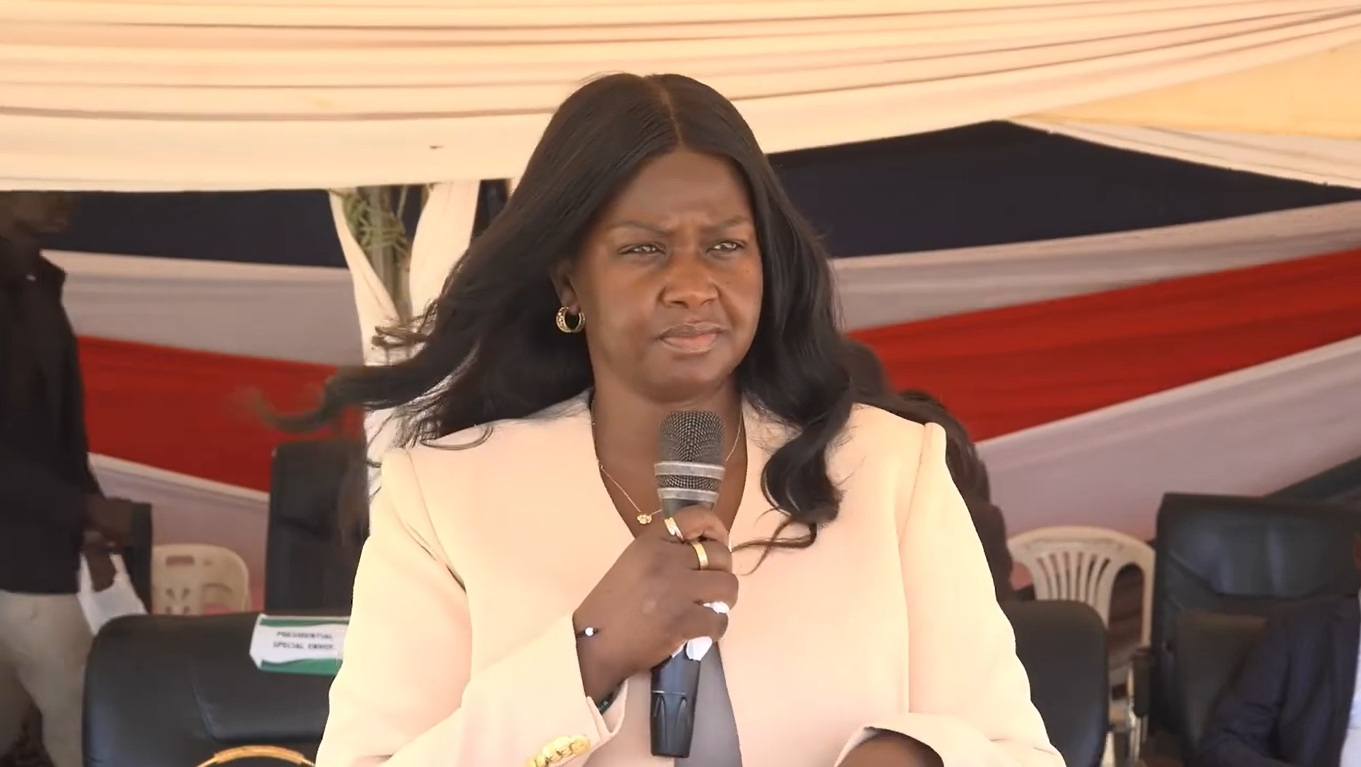

Presidential Envoy on Special Programs
- Incumbent
- Assumed office 21 August 2025
- President: Salva Kiir Mayardit
- Preceded by: Benjamin Bol Mel

Personal details
- Parents: Salva Kiir Mayardit (father); Mary Ayen Mayardit (mother)
- Occupation: Politician
- Known for: Adut Kiir Foundation (ASK)

Adut Salva Kiir is a South Sudanese politician. She is the current Presidential Envoy for Special Programs for South Sudan, the founder and Chairperson of the Adut Salva Kiir Foundation also known as the ASK Foundation. She is the eldest child of President Salva Kiir Mayardit and First Lady Mary Ayen Mayardit.

== Career ==
Before entering the government role, Adut was already active in public service through the Adut Salva Kiir Foundation (ASK), which she founded in 2022. The organisation focuses on supporting communities in need, with efforts ranging from food donations to schools and hospitals, to the drilling of boreholes across the country.

=== Presidential Envoy for Special Programs ===
On August 19, 2025, president Salva Kiir Mayardit, appointed Adut Salva Kiir as Senior Presidential Envoy on Special Programmes, a role previously held by Former Vice President, Benjamin Bol Mel.

Adut took the oath of the office at the State House in Juba on August 22, 2025. Her tasks are not clearly defined but may include facilitating various government initiatives and managing international partnerships.

==== Activities as Presidential Envoy ====
Humanitarian support: Returnees from Sudan Shortly after her appointment, a delegation from her office visited Renk County in Upper Nile State to assess the humanitarian and living conditions of returnees and displaced populations from Sudan. They toured Protection of Civilians (POC) camp sites and transit centres.

The National Prayer Breakfast Adut chaired the organising committee for a National Prayer Breakfast on December 20, 2025, hosted by President Kiir at the State House. She described the event as "historic" and welcomed the president's decision to make it an annual observance.

Scholarship Awards In February 2026, Adut Salva Kiir announced that she would provide scholarships to about 200 students and children of veterans of the liberation struggle. She said the scholarship is a symbolic gestiure to those that fought for the independence of South Sudan.

Donations Adut's office has been giving food donations and other items to hospitals or orphanage. In December, 2025, her office donated food items, cloth and matresses to Giada hospital and Orphanage. Her office donated relief supplies to Juba Milary Hospital in June 2026.
