= Robert Hobart Davis =

American journalist

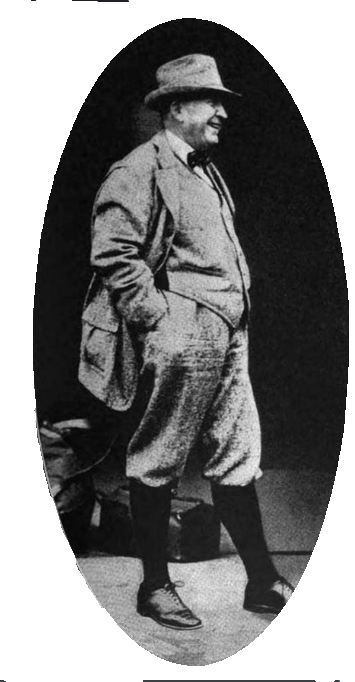
Robert H. Davis, circa 1924

Robert Hobart Davis (March 23, 1869 – 1942) was a dramatist, journalist, and photographer from the U.S. He edited Munsey's Magazine from 1904 until 1925 and was a columnist for The New York Sun from 1925 to 1942 The New York Public Library has a collection of his papers. His photographs include portraits of prominent people.

Davis was born in Brownsville, Nebraska, to Sylvia Nichols and George Ransome Davis. He grew up in Carson City, Nevada, and began his career in newspapers there as a compositor at the Carson City Daily Appeal. He also lived in San Francisco where he reported for the San Francisco Examiner and the Call and Chronicle before moving to New York City in 1895 and joining the New York World and New York Journal. He joined Frank A. Munsey Company papers in 1904.

He was an influence on several authors who became famous and corresponded with many prominent people.

He was part of the Stevenson Society of America.

He interviewed Mussolini in Rome in 1926. He interviewed Angelo Capato.

== Bibliography ==
- We Are French! with Perley Poore Sheehan (1914)
- The Bugler of Algiers with Perley Poore Sheehan, George H. Doran Company, 1916
- Efficiency: a play in one act (1917)
- Man Makes His Own Mask a book of his photographs
- Over my left shoulder : a panorama of men and events, burlesques and tragedies, cabbages and kings and sometimes W and Y
- Bob Davis recalls : Sixty true stories of love and laughter and tears
- Irvin S. Cobb, storyteller : with biographical particulars and notes on his books and who's Cobb and why? (1924)
- I Am the Printing Press (1930)
- Bob Davis at large
- Tree Toad; the autobiography of a small boy
- The caliph of Bagdad : being Arabian nights flashes of the life, letters, and work of O. Henry, William Sydney Porter, co-wrote (1931)
- People, people everywhere; footprints of a wanderer (1936)
- Oriental odyssey; people behind the sun (1937)
- Canada cavalcade; the maple leaf dominion from Atlantic to Pacific (1937)
- Hawaii, U.S.A. illustrated with photographs with George Thomas Armitage (1941)

== Discography ==
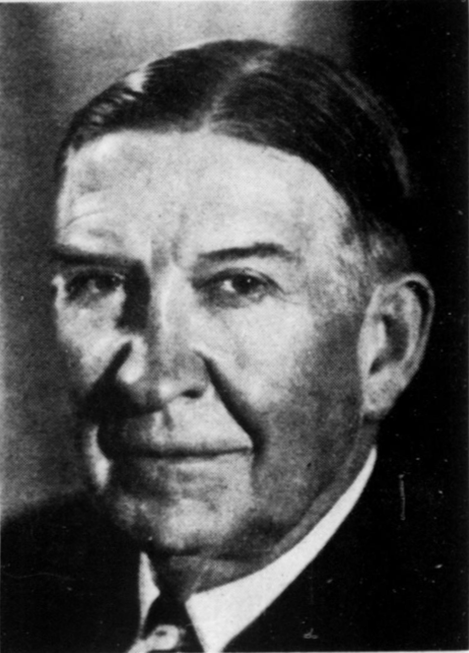
Bob Davis

- "The Woodchuck Song" (1902), source of the phrase "How much wood would a woodchuck chuck" written for Fay Templeton in the musical 'The Runaways and rewritten by Theodore Morse for a 1904 song.
- "Paradox"
- "Lady Bountiful", lyrics

== Filmography ==
- Whoopee! (film), co-wrote screenplay
- The Miracle Man (1932 film), co-wrote screenplay, an adaptation of George M. Cohan's 1914 play.
