= Angelo Capato =

Business magnate on the island of Cephalonia, Greece (1854–1936)

Imprint of a 1908 postcard

Angelo Capato, born Angelos Helia Kapatos (Άγγελος Ήλιος Καπάτος) on the Ionian island of Cephalonia in western Greece (1854–1937), was the most eminent business magnate and "one of the most powerful persons" in the Anglo-Egyptian Sudan at the beginning of the 20th century.

== Life ==
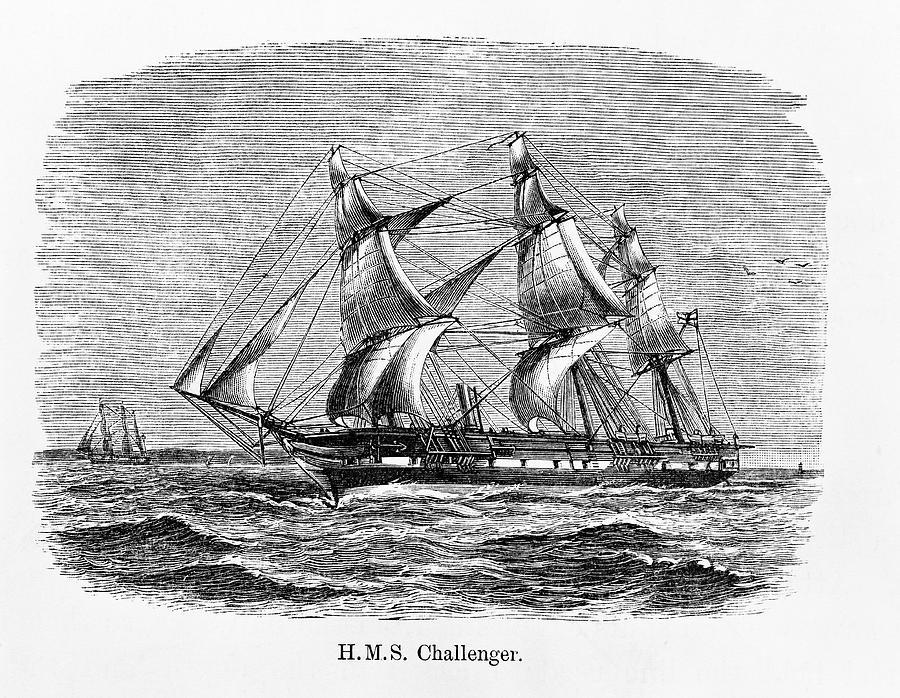
H.M.S. Challenger in 1874

Capato hailed from a naval family on Cephalonia, which had been a British protectorate since 1815. Both his grandfather and his father participated in several military campaigns of the British Royal Navy. He left his home "while still a boy" and joined the British Navy at some point. He arrived in the Egyptian port town of Suez in 1870. Two years later he joined the crew of John Murray's Challenger expedition, a pioneering scientific mission in oceanography that went on until 1876. In 1882 he followed a British Nile exploration mission as a small merchant.

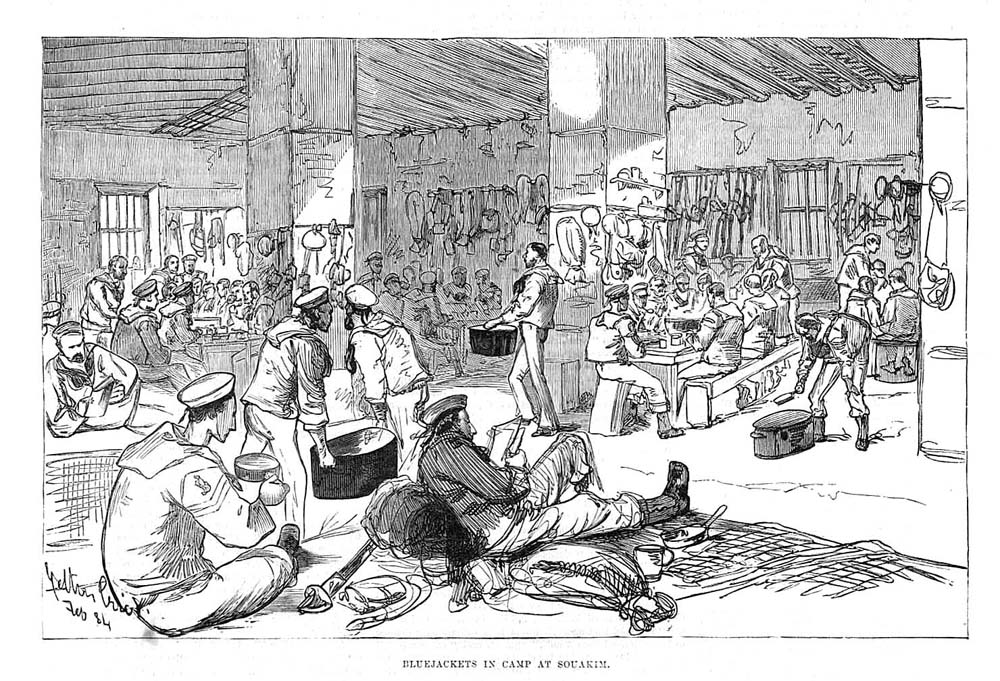
Navy canteen in Suakin, 1884

In 1883, Capato arrived in the Sudanese port town of Suakin at the Red Sea as an agent of the Alexandria-based merchant house John Ross & Co. In 1884, while the indigenous Mahdist rebellion escalated in most of Sudan, he started supplying provisions to the British Army and Navy. After the fall of Khartoum in 1885 to the Mahdist forces, Suakin remained under British control and became an all the more strategically important outpost.

In 1886, the partnership with Ross ended and Capato started his own enterprise. According to Antonis Chaldeos, who has written his PhD thesis about the history of the Greeks in Sudan, Capato in the same year obtained British citizenship. He became the main caterer of the Anglo-Egyptian forces, especially in fresh meat, set up a network of canteens, run by Greeks, and an ice factory. The business offered huge profits, but Capato also suffered heavy losses at times, especially due to animal diseases. At one point, he also recruited some 3.000 contract workers from Yemen for the British authorities in order to fortify Suakin:

"Capato parlayed supplying cattle into supplying men."

When an Anglo-Egyptian army under Herbert Kitchener started the reconquest of Sudan in 1896, Capato and other Greek merchants followed the invading forces from Wadi Halfa and again specialised in catering to the troops and officers. Once more, profit margins for supplying "highly-priced imports" were huge – as were the risks: after the defeat of the Mahdist regime in 1898 and the withdrawal of most of the foreign soldiers, Capato was left "with large stores of 'luxury products' that proved impossible to sell to Egyptian and Sudanese subalterns." While the Sudanese merchant class struggled to recover from the shock of the defeat, the establishment of the Anglo-Egyptian Condominium in 1899 opened vast business opportunities to foreign traders, mainly Greeks like Capato, Lebanese, and Syrians. Capato was especially well-positioned: he apparently not only spoke English and Arabic, but also nine local dialects. And according to Chaldeos,

"he was the closest partner of the government and General Commander itself."

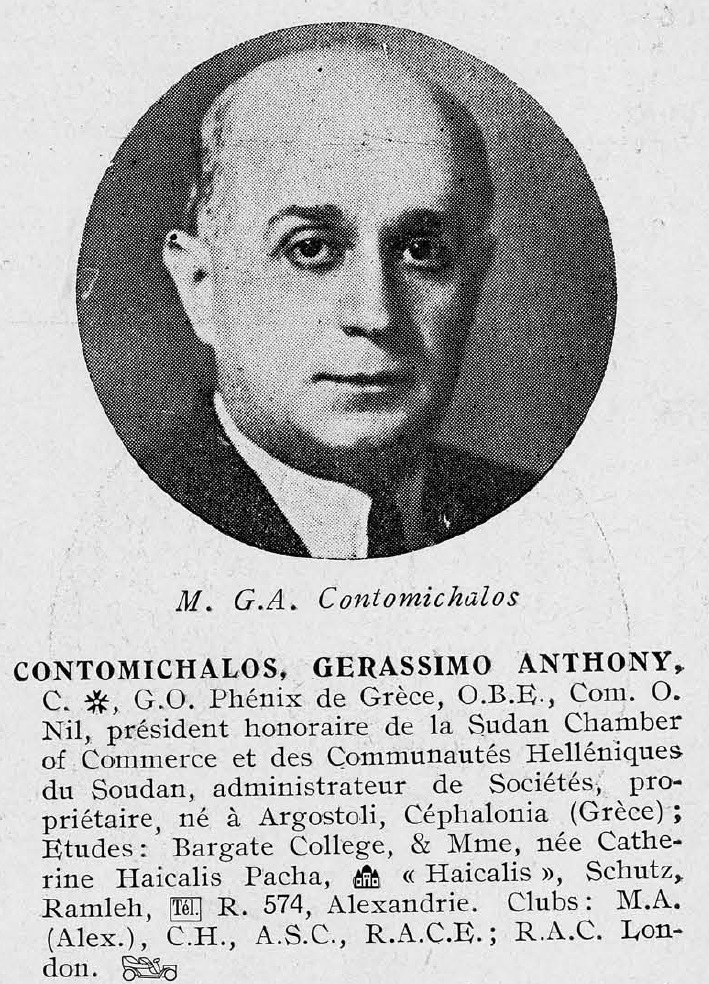
Capato's nephew Contomichalos

Thus, Capato quickly expanded his business activities beyond providing supplies to the colonial regime. In Khartoum, he became one of the "pioneers of construction." He got engaged in the trade with ivory from what was then Southern Sudan and Gum arabic from Kordofan. For this, he set up a network of trading posts across the country with Greek agents, who bought ivory and gum while also catering to colonial officials. One of the boats owned by Capato and used for transporting goods on the White Nile was named after his home-island Cephalonia.

Soon his business activities expanded into the Congo Free State as well, where he also set up a network of Greek agents - thereby contributing to the creation of a Greek community in Congo which still exists today. Likewise it may be argued that he was one of the founding father's of the Greek community in South Sudan.

At the same time, Capato owned hotels, started a publishing company for postcards (see header photo), and ran a service for fitting out Big-game hunting parties. In addition, "he acquired large estates in the Gezira and around Khartoum" for cotton cultivation. According to Chaldeos, he leased some 6,000 hectares, which yielded 100,000 pounds of cotton in 1907.

For his manyfold business activities, Capato recruited large numbers of Greeks, preferably family members like his nephew Gerasimos Contomichalos, who went on to succeed his uncle as the most eminent merchant magnate for almost half a century:

"This recruitment profile ensured the employment of trustworthy men to fill important positions such as managers of store-houses or branches of the firm. These young men usually stayed with the firm for a few years in order to gain a working knowledge of Arabic, familiarise themselves with the new environment and learn their jobs from the inside. Having completed their 'apprenticeship,' many decided to try their luck on their own by setting up a small canteen in a different part of the country."

As the number of Greeks in Sudan grew rapidly, Capato played a key role in establishing the Hellenic Community of Khartoum in 1902. He became its first deputy chairman and a few years later its president as well. Also in 1902, he was one of the founding members of the Omdurman Chamber of commerce and – in 1908 – of the Greek Chamber of Commerce of Khartoum. In 1907, another relative of Capato's – Paraskevas Capatos – became the founding chairman of the Hellenic Community of Port Sudan. Also in 1907, when the British strategists worried that an insurgency in Egypt could spread to Sudan, Capato founded upon the request by Governor-general Reginald Wingate the Greek Rifle Club,

"which could serve as the venue for covert military exercises. Whatever the nature of this episode, it says something about how Capato – and probably many other Greeks – saw themselves as stalwarts of the 'colonial' order."

At the height of Capato's wealth and power – in 1906 – the British archaeologist Reginald Campbell Thompson met Sudan's "Napoleon of finance" in Suakin and noted:

"so great was his name that one was inclined to think of Pope Gregory, Non Anglo Sudan, Sed Angelo."

In the same year, however, Capato's fortunes started turning in the fashion of an Ancient-Greek tragedy:

"A string of bad luck began when a storm sank a large number of his boats (some sailing northwards carrying gum, others going south with salt and general merchandise) between Shellal and Wadi Halfa. Nothing was insured and the combined loss totalled £46,200. Just after this misfortune, a fire at Port Sudan caused losses of £33,000 or more; then fire (probably arson) in his Khartoum stores caused £55,800 in damage, and, finally, a fire in his storehouse in Gondokoro destroyed goods worth £47,000."

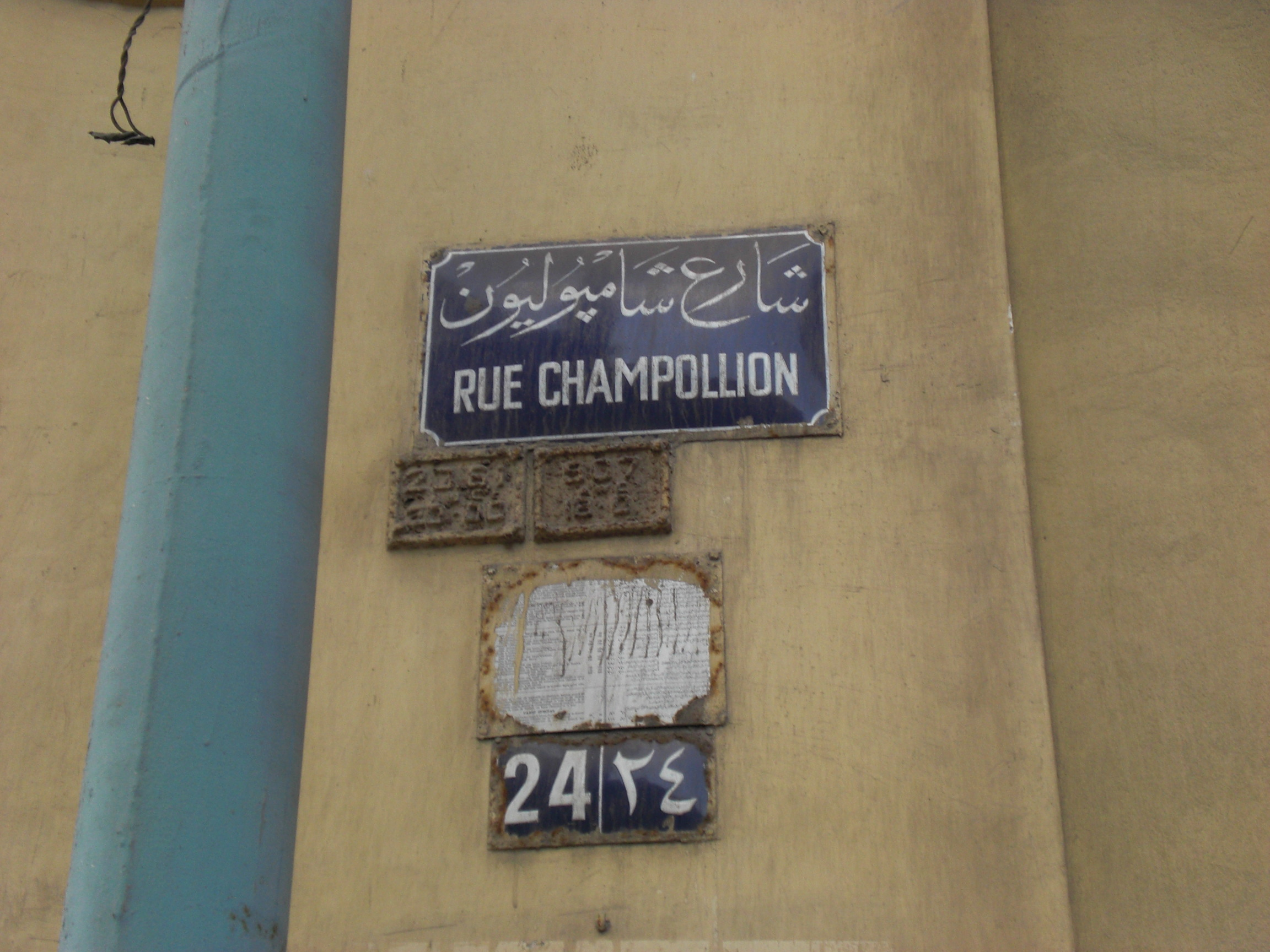
Rue Champollion in Alexandria, where Capato spent his final years.

In the following years those misfortunes continued, while his Creditors grew ever more nervous about their dues. By 1912 the debt burden had grown so huge that Capato had to declare bankruptcy. Two years later, with support from his nephew Contomichalos, Capato made a comeback by starting a small canteen.

In 1926, Capato received the Order of the British Empire.

When his small business collapsed as well two years later, Capato moved to Alexandria, since there was a considerable community of Greeks in Egypt at the time. The US-dramatist Robert Hobart Davis interviewed him there in his eightieth year and found him

"with both legs broken, [..] writing his memoirs and contemplating his dramatic past."

Little has been published about Capato's private life, except that he was "the father of a large family." In his final years, he lived in 19 Rue Champollion of Alexandria with a monthly allowance of £55 from Contomichalos, who pledged to pay this sum until Capato's financial situation improved. Shortly before his death in 1937, Capato commented though laconically:

"better days never came."

== Legacy ==
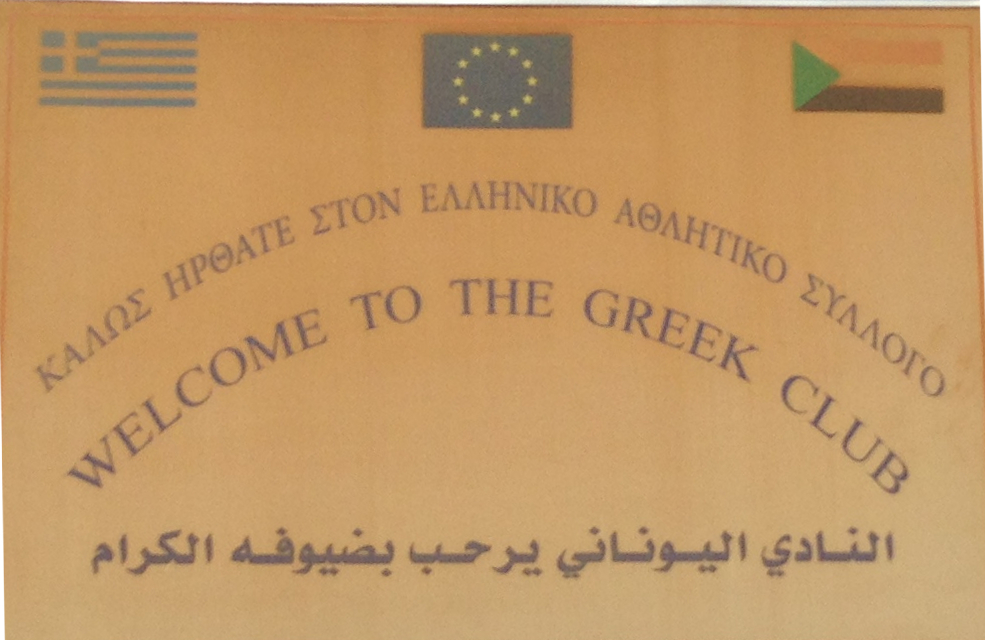
The Hellenic Athletics Club in Khartoum (2018)

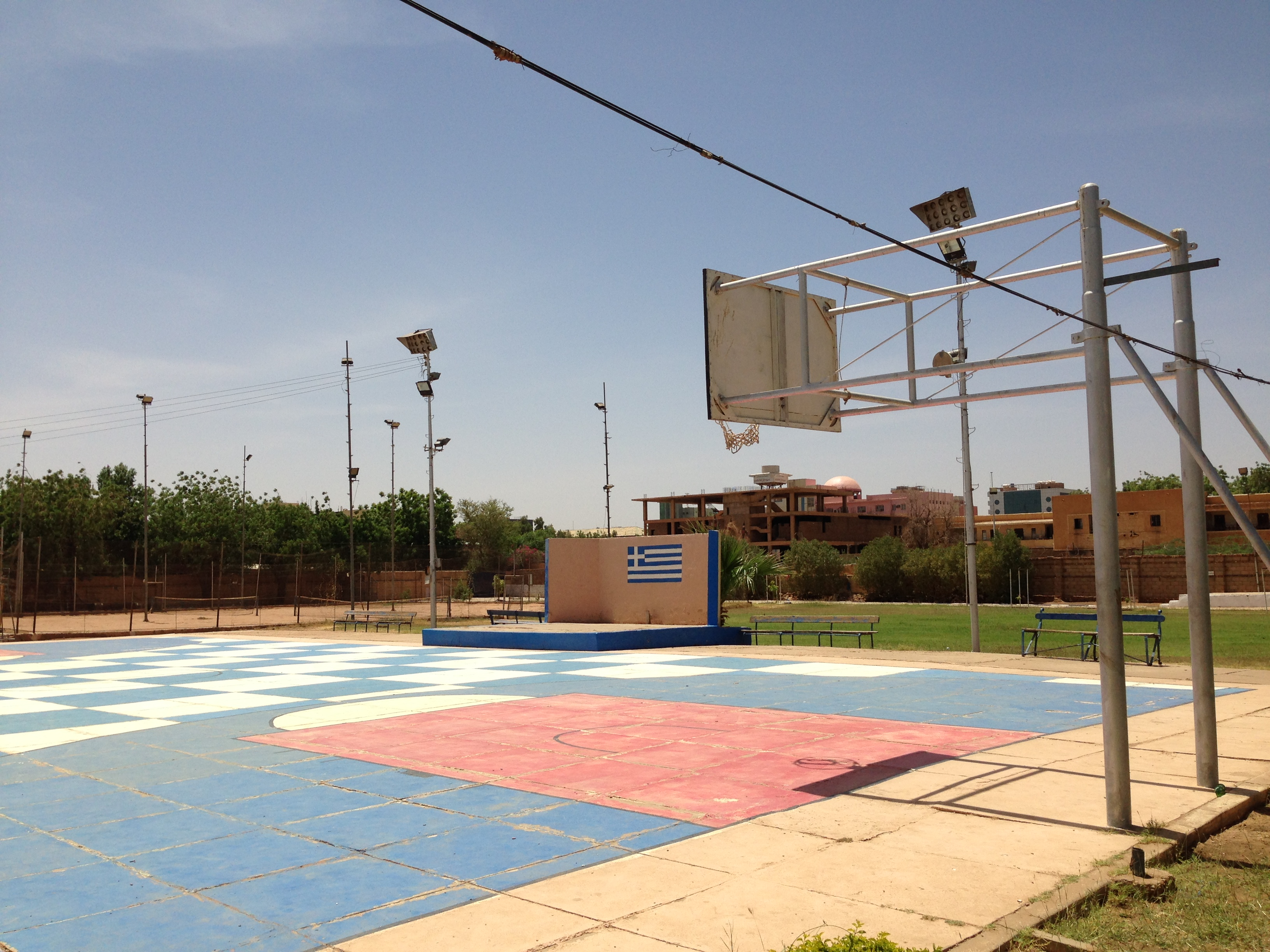
The club premises (2018)

The Greek Rifle Club, which Capato founded, continues to exist one century later as one of the most prominent places of Greek presence in Sudan in the form of the Hellenic Athletics Club (H.A.C.), since the Greek Rifle Club merged with the Hellenic Gymnastics Club in 1913. H.A.C. is especially popular with expatriates for its swimming pool. The Hellenic Community of Khartoum, which Capato co-founded, continues to exist as well, though its membership numbers dropped to about 150 in the mid-2010s – about the same level as at its creation in 1902.

For Sudan academia, Capato's life-story is especially interesting, since he wrote – or dictated – his memoirs a few years before his death. The unpublished manuscript in English language was given by Edwin Geoffrey Sarsfield-Hall, who entered the colonial Sudan Political Service in 1909 and retired in 1936 as Governor of Khartoum, to the Sudan Archive of Durham University. The Greek anthropologist Gerasimos Makris, who is related to the Greeks of Sudan through marriage, and the Norwegian historian Endre Stiansen conclude:

"Capato's career demonstrates how a Greek trader (carrying a British passport) of no private means exploited economic opportunities to build his own business and become a pillar of the society. Moreover, his life history provides an interesting perspective both on social and economic changes in the Sudan during the first part of the Condominium period, as well as the formation of a strong foreign community."

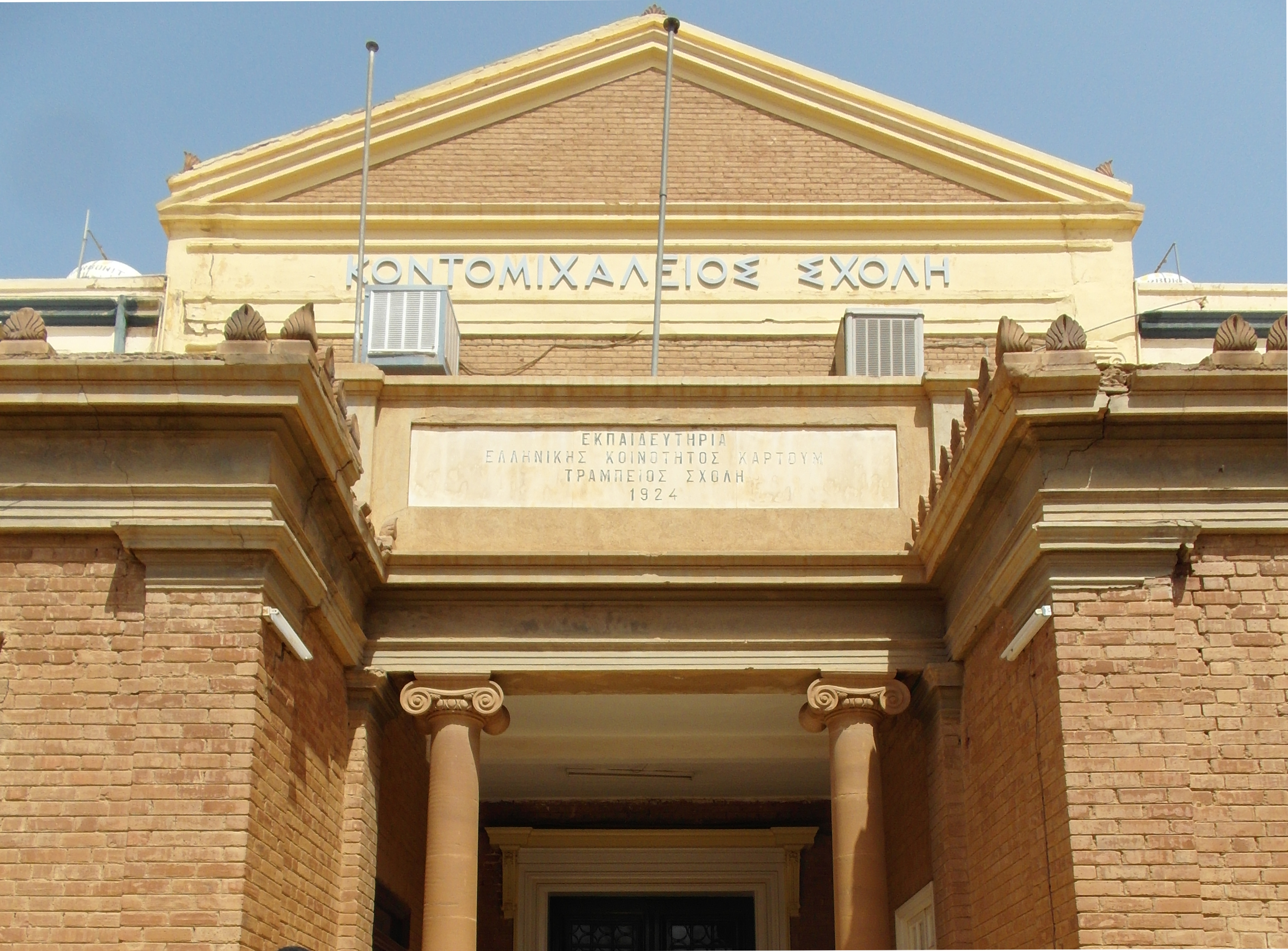
The Kontomichaleios High School and Lyceum in Khartoum (2015), named after Capato's nephew

And:

"Capato belonged to the 'high class' of Greek settlers, but after the collapse of his business ventures he did not have the means to play a leading role in the society. In a certain sense, he continued to influence the development of the Greek community through his nephew, Gerasimos Contomichalos. By contrasting the two men, it is possible to see how the community had changed from 1900 to 1920. While Capato was an energetic daredevil who thrived on chaos, Contomichalos came to the Sudan as a well-educated young man who distinguished himself by working hard and methodically. If Capato represented the colourful and adventurous past of the Greek presence in the Sudan, Contomichalos personified the accomplishments of the mature community."
