= Philip Akot Akok Kiir =

South Sudanese pastor and politician

Personal details
- Born: January 1, 1937 (age 89)
- Occupation: pastor and politician

Philip Akot Akok Kiir (born January 1, 1937) is a South Sudanese pastor, former educator and politician.

== Life and career ==
Kiir is an educator and a politician in South Sudan. A graduate of University of Khartoum, Bachelor of Arts in History & Arts. He worked as a teacher in various provinces of Sudan, including El Fashir in Darfur. From 1973 to 1977 he was a member of Sudan's National Parliament. And from 1978 to 1979 he was the Controller of Parliament in the autonomous government of South Sudan. He was a member of the SANU (Sudan African National Union).

Philip Akot Akok Kiir quit politics in 1982 and became the Director General (Deputy Minister) for the Ministry of Education & Social Services in Wau, Bahr El Ghazal province (which later became four States; Warrap State, Western Bahr el Ghazal, Northern Bahr el Ghazal, and Lakes). He undertook the greatest establishment of schools in South Sudan, particularly in Bahr el Ghazal.

In the early 1990s when Omar al-Bashir came to power, he was arrested and went missing for six months. He was believed to have been tortured by the Bashir regime.

Kiir migrated to the United States at the end of 1999. Five years later, he enrolled in Houston Baptist University and is now a pastor. He continues to preach in Kuajok, Warrap State.
