= Nile Pilot =

- Type: Daily newspaper
- Political alignment: Umma Party (Sadiq Wing)
- Language: English language
- Headquarters: Khartoum

Nile Pilot was an English-language daily newspaper published from Khartoum, Sudan. The newspaper was founded in 1965. It was linked to Sadiq wing of the Umma Party.
