= Mary Ayen Mayardit =

First Lady of South Sudan

First Lady of South Sudan
- Incumbent
- Assumed office 9 July 2011 Serving with Aluel William Nyuon Bany
- President: Salva Kiir Mayardit
- Preceded by: position established

Personal details
- Spouse: Salva Kiir Mayardit

Mary Ayen Mayardit is a South Sudanese politician and the current First Lady of South Sudan.

She became the First Lady following the independence of South Sudan in 2011, when her husband, Salva Kiir Mayardit, assumed office as President.

== Advocacy and initiatives ==
Mary Ayen Mayardit has advocated for education and welfare initiatives targeting children and vulnerable groups. She has supported programs focused on women’s welfare and promoted girls’ education, including efforts to address early marriage in South Sudan. She has participated in charitable activities, such as distributing aid materials, including food and school supplies to disadvantaged communities.

== Personal life ==
She is married to Salva Kiir Mayardit, the President of South Sudan. They have children together.

== See also ==
- South Sudan
- Salva Kiir Mayardit
