= Gemma Collins: Self-Harm & Me =

British television documentary

- Genre: Television documentary
- Directed by: Philip McCreery
- Starring: Gemma Collins
- Original language: English

Production
- Executive producers: Rachel Arnold; Jon Green
- Running time: 60 minutes (inc. adverts)
- Production company: Definitely

Original release
- Network: Channel 4
- Release: 16 February 2022

Gemma Collins: Self-Harm & Me is a British television documentary fronted by media personality and businesswoman Gemma Collins. The documentary follows Collins as she gives an intimate and personal account of her struggles with self-harm and how it has impacted her life. The special aired on 16 February 2022 on Channel 4. The documentary received mostly positive reviews from critics writing for newspapers including The Guardian, The Independent and The Daily Telegraph, who praised the different side that Collins had shown to her personality and accredited her with raising awareness for self-harm.

== Production ==
The commissioning of the documentary was announced by Channel 4 in July 2021 and was described as a raw and candid documentary revealing Gemma Collins' "painful experience" with self-harm. The film was produced by Definitely, which is part of the production company Banijay UK who worked with Collins alongside mental health charity Mind to investigate what is behind the rise in cases of self-harm in the United Kingdom. Upon the announcement, Lee McMurray, the commissioning editor for Channel 4, said: "Gemma Collins has taken the brave decision to open up about her own experience with self-harm. As an instantly recognisable and relatable figure we applaud her courage in revealing her own struggles, and hope this film and her insight will spark vitally important conversations around young people and self-harm." Collins described the documentary as the "best television [she's] ever made", because she is "not [her alter ego] the GC on there – she is very much herself". She also added that she was keen to tackle the subject of self-harm following the suicide of her friend Rhys the previous year.

== Content ==
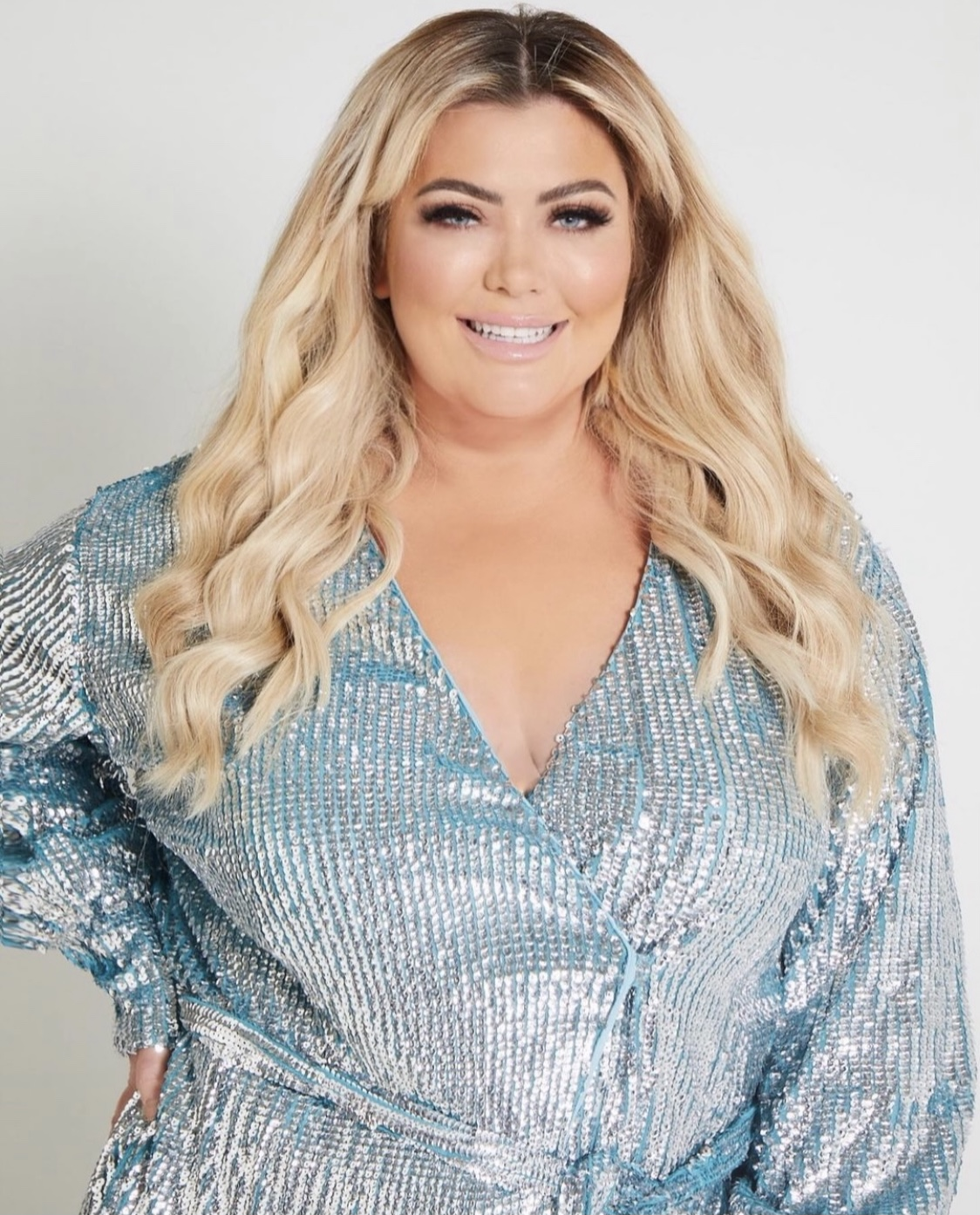
The documentary sees Gemma Collins exploring the root of her self-harm.

Gemma sits down with therapist Mandy Saligari, whom she first met when she appeared on In Therapy in 2016; and tells her that she began self-harming at the age of 13, confessing that she felt scared and ashamed and never told anybody due to the fear of being admitted to a mental health hospital. She admits that the first time she self-harmed was in front of her parents, who were shocked but continued as normal and the incident wasn't spoken about again. Gemma meets her school friend Vicky, who tells her she knew "something wasn't right" and that [Gemma] never opens up about how she is feeling. Gemma then visits a pharmacy and demonstrates the type of plasters she would use to hide her scars before attending a self-harm support group in Essex, where she speaks to three women about their experiences. Her fiancé Rami recalls the time he had caught Gemma self-harming and her subsequent reaction of reassuring him that it wouldn't happen again. She discusses her future plans to have a baby with him and reveals her fears about revisiting self-harm once she's a mother. Gemma tells Mandy she feels very "settled" with Rami, that he loves her for her and showed her compassion throughout her struggle with self-harm. She also discusses how her mother's upbringing contributed to the way she herself was raised, stating that because her mother was adopted and felt abandoned, she grew up with no confidence and therefore pushed [Gemma] to always be confident and perform. Gemma says as a result of this she struggled to open up about her emotions but says she doesn't blame her mother.

Gemma speaks to her mother Joan who struggles to understand what was behind the reason for her self-harming, because she didn't have any stress in her life at a young age. When Gemma asks her why she didn't opt to seek help, her mum says that she didn't feel the need to because she always kept her eye on her. Gemma visits Harmless, a self-harm prevention centre in Nottingham where she speaks to its founder Caroline Harroe about the support they provide and the statistics of self-harm and suicide. She gets emotional when discussing her friend Rhys' suicide and attends the weekly drop-in session at the centre, where she meets two people who have self-harmed. Mandy suggests that the reason Gemma has struggled to open up about how she feels, may be because she has put her parents' feelings first in fear of upsetting them by talking about her own emotions. In the concluding scenes, Gemma and Joan reminisce watching her old stage productions and have an honest and frank discussion about why she self-harmed. Gemma shuts down her mother when she suggests that her self-harming was influenced by something she saw on television. Joan adds that her way of dealing with things was to "carry on and keep everything happy" and that she never thought [Gemma] was depressed, to which Gemma responds that those who self-harm can appear to be "happy" and "normal", but tells her mother she understands why she has struggled to deal with it. Gemma concludes by saying that she has "no grievances with her parents and loves them more than ever", stating that she is ready for the next chapter in her life and has "made peace" with her past.

== Reception ==
Professional ratings
Review scores
Source	Rating
The Daily Telegraph	4/5 stars
The Independent	3/5 stars

Gemma Collins: Self-Harm & Me was nominated within the Authored Documentary category at the 27th National Television Awards. The documentary received praise for tackling the subject of self-harm, with Anita Singh of the Daily Telegraph describing it as "a superb takedown of the stiff upper lip". Singh said the programme demonstrated that "Collins was brought up in a family which, although loving, involved a level of artifice: everyone required to be smiling and strong, sailing through life without a care". She felt that many viewers would relate to the family dynamic shown in the documentary. Despite her critique of Joan Collins' attitude, Singh noted her compassion for the upbringing that she had experienced and felt that this contributed to her attitude when raising Gemma. Singh explained: "Collins's mother was a sweet woman who had buried her own pain at being abandoned as a baby and brought up in foster care. No wonder she attempted to create a perfect childhood of dance lessons and day trips for her daughter."

Nicole Vassell of The Independent felt that the programme showed "a different side" to Collins. She wrote that an important thing for viewers to take away from it was that Collins is "a completely different entity" to her on her other television appearances, and that in the documentary, she comes across as "sensitive, softly spoken and fiercely protective of her loved ones". However, Vassell felt that Collins had an inability to fully address her issues and that it stopped the documentary from reaching its full potential. She felt that Collins sometimes talked about self-harm as though it had not affected her, writing: "this sense of detachment is frustrating: if Collins shies away from going beneath the surface, there’s only so much this project can explore". However, Vassell understood that this could be accredited to the mindset of Collins' mother, as well as noting that Collins' lifelong struggles cannot be "succinctly wrapped up" in a television special. Writing for The Guardian, Hollie Richardson described Collins as a "nice, normal person [...] who talks to people with genuine empathy". She praised Collins for the candid conversations she has with her mother about the past and for highlighting the difficulty many people have in speaking about mental health, especially across the generational divide.
