= Gemma Collins: Everything. All At Once. =

British reality television series

- Genre: Reality television
- Starring: Gemma Collins; Rami Hawash
- Country of origin: United Kingdom
- Original language: English
- No. of series: 1
- No. of episodes: 8

Production
- Running time: 42 minutes (inc. adverts)
- Production company: Navybee

Original release
- Network: Sky One
- Release: 15 September – 20 October 2026

Gemma Collins: Everything. All At Once. is a British reality television series starring media personality and businesswoman Gemma Collins and her fiancé Rami Hawash. The series premiered on Sky One and the streaming service Now on 15 September 2026, and follows the couple, as they embark on IVF treatment and plan their upcoming nuptials, as well as documenting Collins' fertility struggles and Hawash's alcohol dependence. The series also documented the death of Collins' mother Joan, who died during the final episode of which was dedicated to her.

== Production ==
In August 2025, Sky announced the commissioning of Gemma Collins: Four Weddings and a Baby at the Edinburgh International Television Festival. The series was described as "pulling back the curtain on Gemma Collins' life as she enters a pivotal chapter: the road to marriage and motherhood." It is produced by Navybee, a subsidiary of the production company Banijay UK. Following the commissioning of the series, Collins said "This really is the most important year of my life, and for the first time people will get to see the Gemma behind the GC. Over the next year I will be planning my wedding and beginning the steps into starting a family. I've always felt natural in front of the cameras, but now I want to let the world see the real raw me sharing the most intimate and personal times in my life. I feel ready to truly open up, not just about the present, but about my past and everything I've been through to become the woman I am today.

Speaking on the commissioning of the series, creative director of Navybee, Demi Doyle said: "Over the years I've had the privilege of getting to know [Collins] beyond the headlines and the glamour, and I've come to love her for her honesty, humour and heart. This brand new series will capture her at her most real and most vulnerable, as she steps into the biggest chapter of her life yet. We couldn't be more excited to share this journey with her." Whilst Sky's commissioning editor Shirley Jones added "We're thrilled to be working with [Collins] on such an intimate and emotional journey. Audiences know her for her humour and sparkling personality, but this show will reveal a more personal side as she plans her wedding and embarks on the journey to start a family. It promises to be compelling, relatable, heartfelt, surprising, and of course, full of [Collins'] inimitable energy."

In September 2026, it was announced that the series had been renamed to Gemma Collins: Everything. All At Once. and that its premise would differ to how it was initially planned. Sky teased that the series would "show [Collins'] personal life's "very real challenges" and said "filming began as Gemma and partner Rami Hawash are preparing to get married and start a family while being in the public eye" as well as facing "the deeply personal and emotional world of fertility" adding that Rami faces "challenges that put pressure on their relationship." [...] It outlines how Gemma worries putting her career first could mean she's left it too late to start the family she says she's always wanted. Sky also said they were given "extraordinary access" to Collins behind closed doors" and show her when "her bravado drops and she's vulnerable and exhausted."

Speaking at the Edinburgh International Television Festival, Philip Edgar-Jones, Executive Director of Unscripted Originals at Sky said: "There's a wonderful show coming out with Gemma Collins. She's a character that really resonates with a specific audience. We announced the show last year but it's not the show we've ended up with", adding that Collins had had a very different year than the one she planned and it's quite unexpected, quite surprising, very moving and a powerful piece of television. We're just finishing it off at the moment that's due to come out on September and it's really interesting." Collins said ahead of the premiere: "For the past year, I've let the cameras into my life in a way I never have before, it's been a year I could never have predicted. A rollercoaster of emotions, with some of the happiest moments, some of the hardest, and times where I've felt more vulnerable than I ever thought I would. I've shared parts of myself and my life that I've always kept private, and looking back now, this film means more to me than I could ever put into words. Thank you to Sky and Navybee for treating my story with so much care, kindness and sensitivity, and for allowing me to tell it in my own way. I want to thank you all for baring with me and I hope you look forward to watching the show. This is me, my family, my life... everything, all at once. The eight-episode series premiered on 15 September 2026 on Sky One and was also released on Now, with the first three episodes being released on the same day, and the remaining episodes airing weekly until concluding on 20 October 2026.

== Episodes ==
No. overall	No. in series	Title	Original release date
1	1	"Episode 1"	15 September 2026
The episode begins with Gemma reading a hate mail letter she has received in the post. She prepares to fly out to appear on the second series of I'm a Celebrity... South Africa, and explains the reason she left her original series was because she had been attacked by a former boyfriend the day prior to her appearance. She expresses her reservations about leaving her mother Joan who is ill, and missing her father Alan's birthday, both of whom are now living with her. Gemma arrives in South Africa and is excited when she spots some monkeys during her journey. She subsequently competes in the series and returns home, after lasting three times as long as her original stint and taking on various trials. Rami welcomes Gemma home, as she begins the process of IVF by providing a blood sample and is optimistic when she sees angel numbers. Gemma and Rami go on holiday to Cyprus, where they speculate over why they have been unable to conceive and plan their wedding. Upon returning home, Gemma's PA Alexis reveals she has received more hate mail in the post, and is subsequently being investigated by the police. Gemma and Rami return to the Collins' family home to collect some of her mother's belongings, and prays to the moon for her mum. Joan is subsequently taken into hospital with pneumonia, and Gemma shares her concerns over Rami's drinking.
2	2	"Episode 2"	15 September 2026
Following Joan's admission to hospital, Gemma shares her concerns on the phone to her agent Mark. She tells how her mother shaped her life and created their strong family unit, and expresses how she would love to have a child and give them the same love as Joan gave her. Gemma and Rami go to view a new property which they intend to buy, and discuss arrangements for the house and for their potential baby. Gemma receives a call from her PA Alexis who tells her that Joan has a do not resuscitate order, which Gemma is not happy about. She discusses her mother's recent admissions to hospital, and that the most recent visit was the worst. She tells how Rami understands as he had cared for his father, to which Rami subsequently shares his experiences of the impact his father had on him, and his subsequent passing. Gemma receives word that her blood results are in, and plans and appointment for the next step of her IVF journey. She talks about the relationship with her stepson Tristan, and how she deals with his ADHD and ASD. Gemma and Rami take Tristan to a farm, where they pet goats. At home, Rami cooks Gemma dinner and they talk about the stress he is under, and how he turns to drinking, with Gemma suggesting he have therapy. Gemma heads to a personal appearance, where she is fronting an event for AliExpress, and shares how work takes her mind off events. Gemma prepares a meal for Rami, however notices that he is drunk and an argument ensues, concluding with Gemma walking out to go and see her mother in hospital, as she questions their relationship.
3	3	"Episode 3"	15 September 2026
Following their argument, Gemma ponders over events before announcing that their previous house has fallen through, and goes to view a property in Hampstead Heath. She calls Rami, hoping for a fresh start, however he has decided to move out and tells Gemma he wants to take a break from their relationship, to her dismay. Rami confides in his friend Kyri over his drinking problem, who encourages him to talk. Gemma goes to visit her friend DJ Fat Tony, who has also suffered with addiction issues, and expresses her concerns about starting a family during Rami's alcohol dependence. Gemma makes sure preparations are in place as Joan returns from hospital. DJ Fat Tony speaks to Rami on the phone, and offers to get him help, which Rami is willing to accept. After spending several days in a hotel, Rami returns home, and Gemma makes him dinner, as they declare their love for each other and discuss moving forward. They spend Christmas with family which is not filmed, before visiting St. Moritz for Gemma's birthday, where she tells she is glad of the break and Rami gifts her some jewellery. They speak about what's next for them when they return home, and Gemma shares her hopes for Rami to get sober, before heading up the mountains, where she shouts out and asks them to give her a baby.
4	4	"Episode 4"	22 September 2026
Gemma and Rami head to the Portland Hospital to begin their fertility journey. Rami is asked to provide a sperm sample for testing, whilst Gemma orders a baby book online. The couple sit down with gynaecologist Rehan Salim and discuss their struggles to conceive thus far with Gemma detailing an earlier miscarriage. Gemma undergoes a scan, and is informed that her advanced age gives her a low chance of conceiving naturally, however she remains optimistic and shuts down Mr Salim's suggestion of egg donation. The following morning, Gemma and Rami discuss the previous days events, and are upset at the news they received. Gemma phones her psychic in hope of hearing that she'll become pregnant. Rami shares an update on his alcohol issues, and his new techniques for coping. Gemma's stepson Tristan's mother Fernanda is round the family home, and they and Rami discuss their blended family and positive relationship whilst cooking. After her car breaks down and she's forced to get an Uber, Gemma returns to hospital for a follow up appointment, after which she begins taking clomifene to try and help her get pregnant. Gemma and Rami discuss the difficulties they have getting alone time in their busy house and with her mother's illness. Following a further appointment ahead of ovulation, Gemma is told she has a 1% chance of conception, and she stresses to Rami the importance of them making love regularly. Rami expresses his desire for Gemma to become a mum, however that she is beginning to face the reality of the situation. Gemma heads to the Cotswolds with her friends, where she talks through her fears at leaving having children too late.
5	5	"Episode 5"	29 September 2026
Gemma prepares a spread for Mother's Day which she celebrates with her family as they discuss the importance of them all being together. The family are optimistic about Joan's health after spending several months out of hospital. Rami FaceTimes his mum in Israel and talks about the difficulties where they discuss the difficulties of being long distance due to the war over there. Gemma discusses her concerns about Rami's drinking again whilst she prepares a meal for their dinner, over which they express their love for one another, and Gemma expresses her concerns for their future unless Rami receives help. The following day, they attend a couple's therapy session where they discuss the stresses of their relationship and the impact of Rami's drinking. Gemma discusses her past relationship with James Argent which broke down due to his addiction issues. The therapist concludes that they are both on the same page and are willing to fight for their relationship. Gemma clears out her clothing, some of which she puts on Vinted and sends to the charity shop, whilst reminiscing on times she has worn them. Gemma looks through photos as Rami heads to a health and wellness retreat. Gemma is happy whilst visiting a garden centre, and discusses the struggle of having a relationship in the public eye, however begins to feels at peace that Rami is finally getting help. Rami begins work with a sober coach.
6	6	"Episode 6"	6 October 2026
Gemma prepares to leave for Thailand on a soul searching mission, as Rami begins his therapy with a sober coach at the retreat. Upon arriving at the elephant camp in Chiang Mai, she is enthusiastic and shares pictures of her wooden elephant sculptures with the hotel staff. Rami discusses his dependence on alcohol with the coach and how it has become a medicine for him. The following morning, Gemma heads out to see the elephants, and has the opportunity to feed and walk with them, which she describes as dream come true. After a difficult night, Gemma wakes and struggles with being on her own, calling several of her contacts to no avail. She discusses how she gets her fear of abandonment from her mother Joan, who was adopted at birth and also struggles with being alone. Joan looks at old photos with Gemma's PA Alexis and gets emotional. Rami begins to feel positive about the effects of his stay. Meanwhile, Gemma heads to the temple, where she struggles with the silence and feelings of being alone and ultimately leaves. She subsequently heads to another temple where she practices meditation and is happy of the relief, whilst Rami embarks on a similar technique at the retreat. As they both return home, Gemma prepares some of Rami's favourite foods and notices the improvement. Gemma reflects on her and her mother Joan's childhoods, before her and Rami begin looking into egg donation.
7	7	"Episode 7"	13 October 2026
Gemma surprises Rami with the arrival of some new chickens in the garden. They attend the Portland Hospital to enquire about egg donation, as Gemma realises it may be her only hope. They leave feeling positive, and subsequently have a counselling meeting with the fertility team which is confidential. Gemma and Rami invite friends round for a barbecue, where they discuss their upcoming nuptials. Gemma talks about her parents' marriage, and how she wants the same. Joan is back in hospital after Gemma phoned for an ambulance, and she shares her concerns over how much longer her mum may have left. Her PA Alexis worries over the stress Gemma's under, as Gemma has doubts over whether she's doing the right thing proceeding with the egg donation. Gemma FaceTimes Joan, who is eager to get out of hospital. Gemma reflects on her opportunites and meeting Charles III and Queen Camilla at Clarence House. Gemma and Rami return to the Portland Hospital to select an egg donor, however upon leaving the appointment, realise it isn't right for them. Gemma faces the reality that she will not have a child naturally. The following day, Gemma reflects on recent events and decides she is no longer going through with the fertility treatment.
8	8	"Episode 8"	20 October 2026
Gemma and Rami get emotional watching their proposal video, and plan to have a wedding blessing, before they FaceTime Joan in hospital. Gemma and Rami make some adjustments to their garden alongside gardener Ken, as Joan returns home and Alexis talks about Gemma's resilience. Gemma and Rami set a date for their blessing, however their ideas of the ceremony they want is vastly different. Gemma catches up with her friend Vicky, telling her she has accepted that she won't have a child, but is happy with the family she has. They go to meet a celebrant after Gemma decides she wants a pagan wedding. Rami talks to his friend about their future, and how he plans to accommodate his sobriety. Gemma goes to choose a dress, before reading through her vows. Days before the ceremony is due to take place, Joan is rushed back into hospital, and dies peacefully surrounded by the family. A grieving Gemma tells of her mum's final moments, as Alexis discusses plans for a shrine for her. Gemma plants a rose for her mum in the garden, and reflects on her life. She walks the dogs with Tristan and Rami and emphasises the importance of family and how the year has shaped her for the better. The episode concludes with a tribute to Joan.

== Reception ==
Adam Miller of the Metro ranked the series 5 out 5 stars, describing it as a "gut-punch" documentary and a "rare, if not completely unique, glimpse into what it's really like when life hits you hardest". Miller also noted it was "quite moving" getting to see Collins outside of her alter-ego. He said of the series: "This is the Gemma reserved for home; everything we imagine her to be behind closed doors is so far removed from the soft, effortlessly maternal woman who pours her entire heart into her [stepson], managing his tantrums with such calm and care. There will always be a place for The GC, but it's genuinely quite moving getting to meet the real Gemma Collins."
