= Gemma Collins =

English media personality and businesswoman (born 1981)

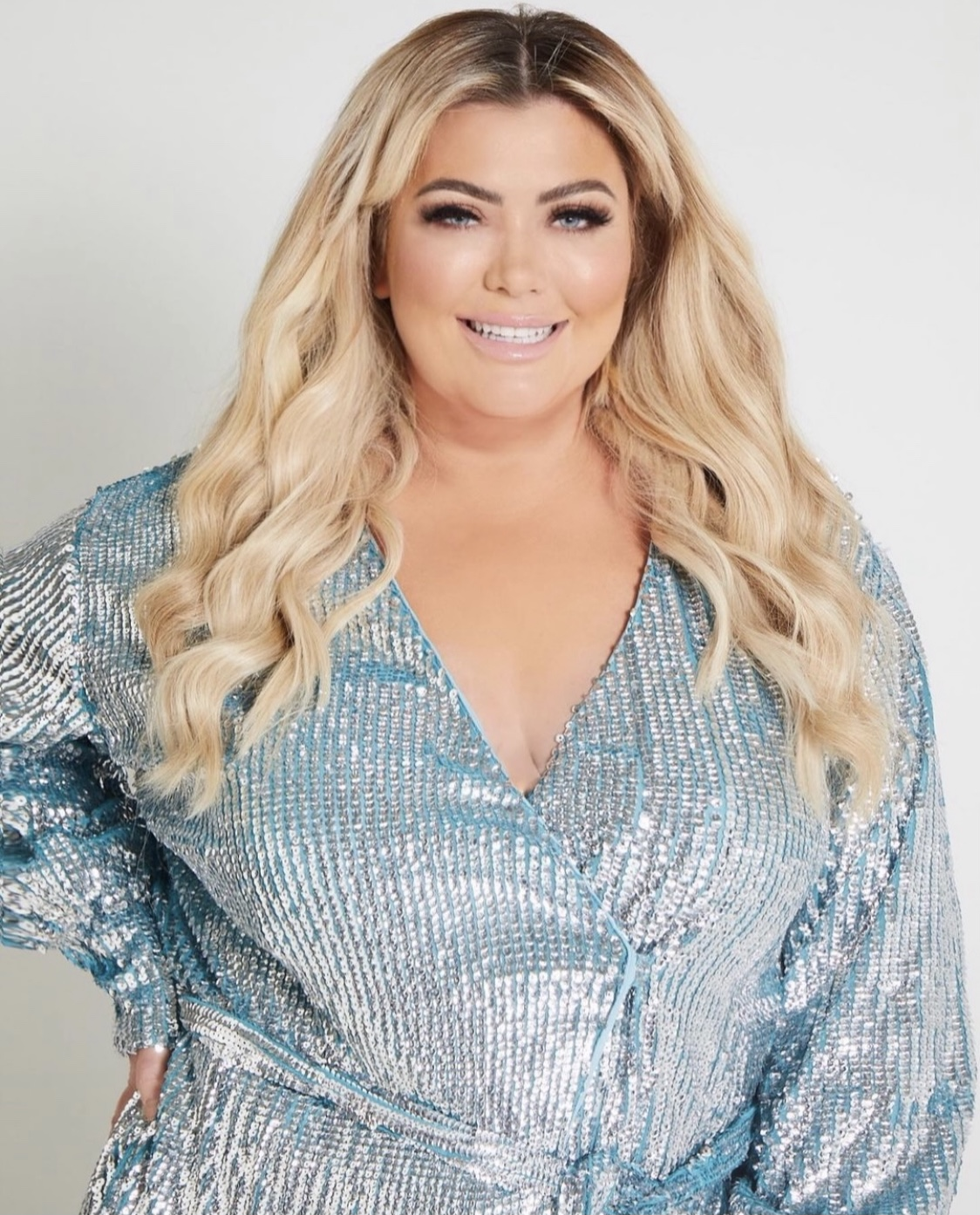
- Collins in 2021
- Born: Gemma Clair Collins; 31 January 1981 (age 45); Romford, East London, England
- Other name: The GC
- Education: Sylvia Young Theatre School
- Occupations: Media personality; businesswoman
- Years active: 2011–present
- Partner(s): Rami Hawash (2011–2014; 2020–present; engaged)
- Website: gemmacollins.com

Gemma Clair Collins (born 31 January 1981) is an English media personality and businesswoman. She rose to prominence whilst appearing on the ITV reality series The Only Way Is Essex (2011–2019) and went on to appear on various other reality television shows, including I'm a Celebrity...Get Me Out of Here! (2014), Celebrity Big Brother (2016), Celebs Go Dating (2018) and Dancing on Ice (2019). Known for her diva persona and alter-ego "the GC", she became the subject of several internet memes and is considered a prominent figure within the British hun subculture.

A sales executive by trade, Collins created her own plus-size clothing brand and owned a fashion boutique in Brentwood, Essex, as well as releasing a fragrance and a line of cosmetics. She has also collaborated with numerous brands to endorse their products alongside her own. Collins published two autobiographies and starred in her own ITV reality television franchise Gemma Collins: Diva (2018–2020). She went on to host the eponymous The Gemma Collins Podcast (2019–2024), as well as its spin-off The Gemma Collins Love Lounge (2020–2021).

In 2022, she fronted a Channel 4 television documentary, Gemma Collins: Self-Harm & Me, based on her personal experiences and embarked on a theatre tour, The GC's Big Night Out. In 2026, she appeared as a contestant on the second series of I'm a Celebrity... South Africa and starred in the Sky One reality series Gemma Collins: Everything. All At Once.

== Early life ==
Gemma Clair Collins was born on 31 January 1981 at Oldchurch Hospital in Romford, East London. She is the daughter of Joan Collins (née Williams; 21 February 1955 — 29 July 2026), who worked as a part-time hairdresser, and Alan Collins, the director of Unisystems Freight, an import-export shipping company. She has an older brother named Russell, who is also a director of their father's company. Shortly after her birth, the family moved from a house in Collier Row and Collins was raised in Rise Park where she attended Rise Park Infant School. Collins described her childhood as being "filled with love" and said that although money was "tight", her father still managed to take them on family holidays and said she has "very happy memories" of her early years.

Collins then went on to attend Frances Bardsley Academy for Girls. She enjoyed performing arts from a young age and attended dance lessons and stage school. At the age of 14, she began attending the Sylvia Young Theatre School and successfully auditioned for a part in The Sound of Music. Collins' mother was encouraging and said she knew that her daughter would one day become famous. Collins was bullied at school for being outgoing and confident, and so following the success of her father's business, her parents decided to move her to Raphael Independent School, a private school, for her final year of education. She left school at the age of 16 with a G in GCSE Maths. Reflecting on her time at school, Collins said "I remember sitting in the exam room for my maths GCSE and thinking, "I'm going to be famous, I don't need maths."

Collins had various Saturday jobs as a teenager, including working in a sweet shop and at the clothes shop Warehouse, before becoming a waitress at a local pub called The Orange Tree. After leaving school, she subsequently signed up to a media studies course at South Essex College but stopped attending after a few weeks as she found it boring. Collins also held a job at the clothes shop Benetton and spent several weeks working in a care home, looking after those who were suffering from mental illnesses. Her first appearance on television was in the ITV documentary Snobs, which aired in January 2000. The series focused on people who believed they were a different class. Following her appearance on the show, Collins, aged 18 at the time, visited an agent who told her that she "had charisma but was too fat to be on TV" and suggested that she should lose two stone. Collins held various admin jobs and roles working on reception during her twenties, as well as being an assistant to a senior executive at stockbrokers Cantor Fitzgerald which Collins said she "blagged" by being confident in interviews. She subsequently worked at a recruitment agency in London before becoming a receptionist at a BMW showroom in Harold Wood, where she retrained to become a sales executive.

== Career ==
=== 2011–2017: The Only Way Is Essex, I'm a Celebrity...Get Me Out of Here! and Celebrity Big Brother ===
In January 2011, Julie Childs, mother of Collins' friend Amy, suggested to producers of the ITV2 reality series The Only Way Is Essex that Collins would be an appropriate subject. They visited Collins' house and subsequently filmed her and her friends for two weeks. After returning to work as a car sales executive for a week, she was cast in the programme and began appearing in The Only Way Is Essex from its second series beginning in March 2011. Her first scene saw her attempting to sell a car to Kirk Norcross and taking him for a test drive. Collins ultimately quit her job to appear on the programme full time, and was paid £50 a day for her early appearances on the show, which she described as a "massive risk". Her mother Joan joined the programme during the fifth series in April 2012. From September 2011 until March 2013, Collins wrote a regular column in the tabloid magazine Closer. In April 2013, she released her debut autobiography Basically...: My Life as a Real Essex Girl, which became a bestseller in its first week of release.

In January 2014, Collins took part in the second series of the ITV diving competition Splash!. During training, Collins suffered severe bruising and admitted she had to overcome a fear of water. She became the third celebrity to be eliminated after losing the splash-off to Michaela Strachan in the first heat. In November 2014, she took part in the fourteenth series of I'm a Celebrity...Get Me Out of Here! on ITV. During the first episode of the series, Collins and her campmates were required to travel into the jungle via helicopter, however she refused to do so, becoming hysterical before the helicopter had taken off and was instead driven into camp. She and her fellow campmates Carl Fogarty, Craig Charles, Nadia Forde and Vicki Michelle were sent to live in the basic camp, "Celebrity Slammer", following a public vote prior to the series launch. After believing she had caught malaria and struggling with the lack of food, Collins withdrew from the series on the third day after spending 72 hours in the jungle. She was subject to online trolling and ridicule from the show's viewers after her exit, later revealing that she was attacked and robbed by a former boyfriend the day prior to flying out to Australia, as well as her mother's health issues, which contributed towards her reasons for quitting the show. Collins received a reduced fee for her appearance, the entirety of which she donated to the charity Save the Children. In August 2015, following the conclusion of the fifteenth series of The Only Way Is Essex, Collins announced she would be leaving the show after four years. However, she subsequently returned for the Christmas special episode of the sixteenth series and continued to appear on the programme sporadically for the next four years, with her appearances becoming less frequent in latter series due to her other commitments. She made her final appearance on the show during the twenty-fifth series in November 2019. Collins was voted the show's "Most Iconic Cast Member" in the special anniversary episode TOWIE Turns 10: All Back to Essex in September 2020, for which she made a cameo appearance in a video acceptance message.

In January 2016, she entered the Celebrity Big Brother house to participate as a housemate in the seventeenth series. Collins became known for her "diva outbursts" on the show, one of which saw her refuse to be locked inside a cage as part of a shopping task and proclaim to fellow housemate Darren Day that she was "claustrophobic", which would become one of her most well known memes. Her other notable moments in the house included gifting Tiffany Pollard a pair of Dolce & Gabbana shoes for her birthday, before taking them back, resulting in a confrontation, as well as confiding in the former that she believed she was pregnant, ultimately discovering she was not. Collins also struggled with being unable to maintain her hair within the house, exclaiming to Big Brother that her "hair was frazzled" and berated them for not providing heated rollers. She would later sacrifice the hot water in the house to receive a blow dry as part of an immunity prize. Collins received nine nominations from her housemates throughout the series, facing a total of three evictions, two of which she survived on days 11 and 18 respectively. She also won immunity from the fifth eviction after receiving a "gold mask" during the "Forgotten Theatre" task. Three days prior to the final, after being nominated against soap actresses Danniella Westbrook and Stephanie Davis, she became the seventh housemate to be evicted, having received the fewest votes to be saved, spending a total of 29 days in the house. In October 2016, Collins appeared on Sky News where she was interviewed by Kay Burley about the campaign to remove the word "Essex girl" from the Oxford English Dictionary. Collins described the definition, which stereotypes Essex girls as "unintelligent, promiscuous, and materialistic", as derogatory and suggested that the meaning be changed. The expression was removed from the Oxford Advanced Learner's Dictionary following the campaign in December 2020.

In January 2017, Collins took part in the second series of Sugar Free Farm, alongside five other celebrities as they attempted to live on a sugar-free diet. During the show she attempted fishing and despite the strict detox plan, Collins said she actually gained weight during the process. In June 2017, Collins returned to Big Brother, as a special guest for a shopping task on the eighteenth civilian series, spending four days in the house alongside fellow ex-housemates Marnie Simpson and Nicola McLean. In October 2017, Collins presented the BBC Radio 1 Teen Award for Best TV Show to Love Island and, after announcing the winner, fell through an opening in the stage. The clip later went viral on social media. In an interview with Irish News, Collins said "the seriousness of it is, it could have been really fatal". After the video's widespread attention, further videos of Collins were used as memes, including scenes from her appearances on The Only Way Is Essex and Celebrity Big Brother.

=== 2018–2021: Dancing on Ice and Diva ===
In January 2018, Collins appeared on Celebrity 100% Hotter in an attempt to change her style. Collins admitted she was "terrified" about having a makeover but said she was keen to try out some different trends. In February 2018, she took part in the fourth series of Celebs Go Dating. During her time on the show, Collins walked out on one of her dates within the first few minutes after he branded her a "diva" due to her being late, whilst she was also reprimanded by the dating experts after she failed to turn up to her date with Laurence, who was planning to take her to Paris. In June 2018, she released her second book, titled The GC: How to Be a Diva, in which she provides advice and self help for women to gain confidence. In an interview on Loose Women, she admitted to using a ghostwriter. She also guest starred in a promotional advert for Netflix's Orange Is the New Black.

Collins went on to appear in Gemma Collins: Diva España, a one-off reality television special which aired in August 2018. In September 2018, Collins took part in the thirteenth series of Celebrity MasterChef. She was eliminated in the second round of the third heat after her sea bass served in greaseproof paper failed to impress the judges. In November 2018, Collins was the subject of a song released by Tallia Storm, titled "It's the GC (Diva Forever)". The song was featured in one of Collins' clothing advertisements for Boohoo.com and later became the theme song of her television franchise Gemma Collins: Diva. In December 2018, Collins took part in a one-off celebrity special of All Together Now. Collins first performed "Big Spender" by Shirley Bassey where she received a score of 88 after impressing the judges with her vocal ability, which secured her a place in the top 3. She then sang "This Is Me" by Keala Settle and The Greatest Showman ensemble and subsequently finished in third place with a score of 39.

Between January and February 2019, Collins took part in the eleventh series of the ITV skating competition Dancing on Ice, alongside professional partner Matt Evers. Her debut performance saw her skate to "Crazy in Love" by Beyoncé, in which she performed the splits on ice and attempted to lift her partner Evers at the end of the routine. She scored 16.0 out of 40.0 points, ultimately receiving the most votes from the public and got through to the next week, with 28.23% of the vote. Following her performance to "Diamonds Are a Girl's Best Friend" in Musicals Week, in which Collins was dressed as Marilyn Monroe and concluded with her being suspended in the air on a giant diamond ring, saw the couple receive 13.0 out of 40.0, the lowest marks of that year's series. Collins subsequently had an on-screen argument with judge Jason Gardiner, who made comments about her weight and lack of commitment to the series, and accused him of selling stories about her to the press. Despite finishing bottom of the leaderboard, they made it through to the following week, where Collins showed notable improvement during her routine to Celine Dion's "It's All Coming Back to Me Now, however she suffered a fall towards the end of the performance, catching her toe pick on the ice and ultimately falling flat on her face, causing her significant injuries and enduring damage to her knee. Despite the fall, the couple received 16.5 points out of 40.0, their highest scores of the competition and subsequently progressed to the next week. For week five, Collins skated to "Look What You Made Me Do" by Taylor Swift, whilst dressed as the Evil Queen for that week's Fairy Tale themed episode. She scored 13.5 points out of 40.0, after which she broke down in tears and admitted her loss of confidence after her fall the previous week. Despite finishing bottom of the leaderboard again, Collins was voted through by the public. In week six, they skated to "Survivor" by Destiny's Child, with Collins attempting the three required elements for that week's routine. They scored 15.5 points out of 40.0, before ending up in the skate-off for the first time against Ryan Sidebottom and his professional partner Brandee Malto. After their skate-off performance to Whitney Houston's "Queen of the Night", which Collins admitted they "hadn't practiced for weeks", they became the fifth couple to be eliminated from the competition, after the judges unanimously voted to save Sidebottom and Malto, ultimately finishing in eighth place.

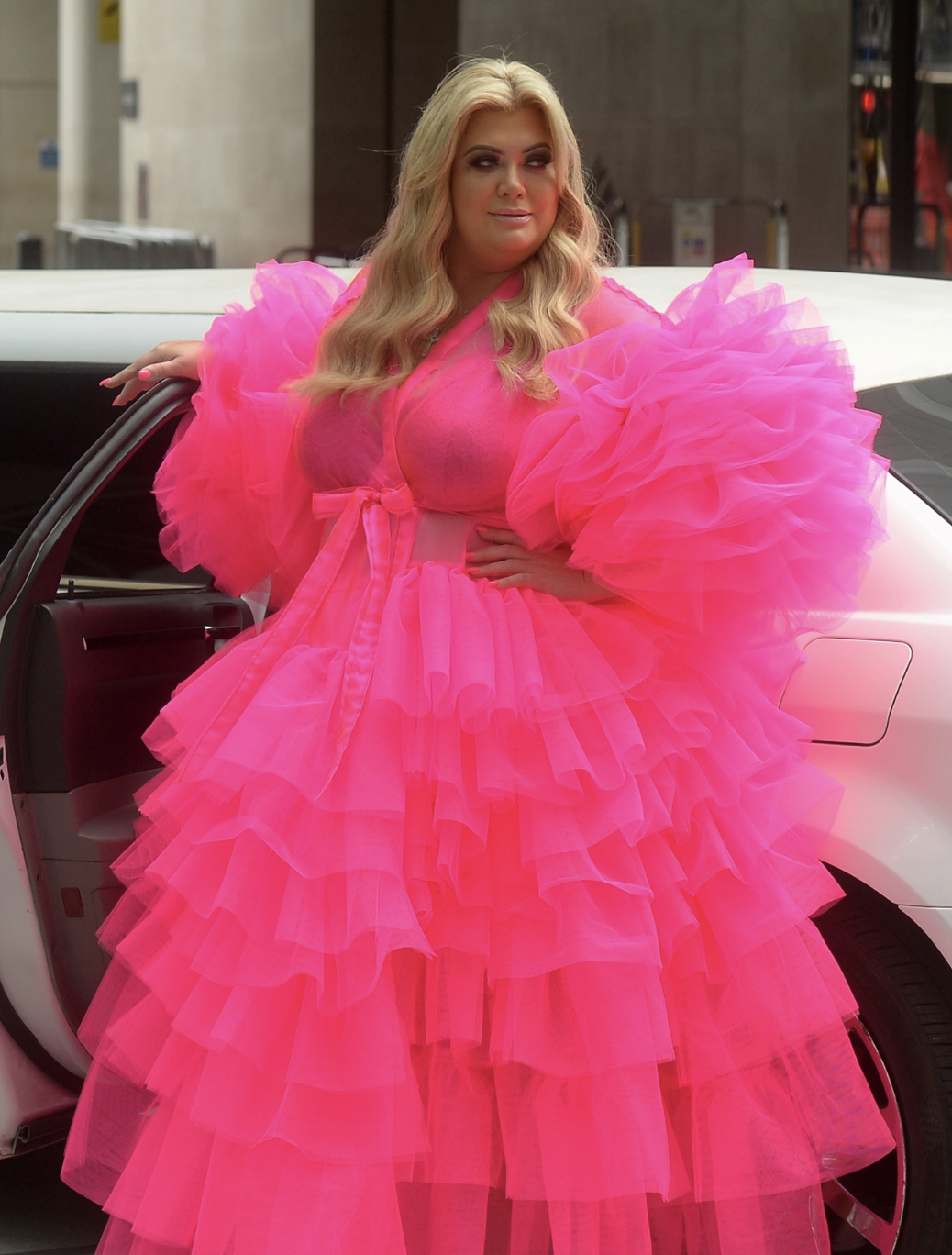
Collins outside the BBC Broadcasting House filming a trailer for The Gemma Collins Podcast in August 2019

In April 2019, Collins began filming for her own reality series, Gemma Collins: Diva Forever. The series premiered in August 2019 on ITVBe. The pilot episode premiered to a total of 673,038 viewers, and was the most watched episode on ITVBe in that week. The same month, Collins began hosting a podcast on BBC Sounds, titled The Gemma Collins Podcast. It was also reported that Collins had signed a record deal with Universal Music Group, and was set to release a single with Naughty Boy after the pair met at the BRIT Awards 2019 and had been impressed by Collins' vocal ability, however plans for this never materialised. Diva Forever was subsequently renewed by ITV for a second series, but due to the COVID-19 pandemic, production was suspended. As a result, Collins filmed a new reality series, Gemma Collins: Diva on Lockdown, which featured Collins and her family in lockdown and aired between April and May 2020. In August 2020, Collins began hosting a second podcast on BBC Sounds entitled The Gemma Collins Love Lounge. In September 2020, Collins hosted a drive-in bingo event for the company PlayOJO at EventCity in Manchester. In October 2020, Gemma Collins: Diva Forever & Ever premiered on ITVBe.

In December 2020, Collins released a charity single, a cover of "Baby, It's Cold Outside" alongside her Celebrity Big Brother co-star Darren Day, with proceeds from the single going towards Rethink Mental Illness. The music video was released at the end of Gemma Collins: Diva for Xmas, which aired two days prior to the single's release and transpired to be the final episode of the show. In February 2021, Collins appeared on Piers Morgan's Life Stories, where she discussed her early life, career, relationships, and miscarriages, as well as her struggles with her weight and online trolling. Collins also appeared as a special guest on the second series of RuPaul's Drag Race UK to participate in the Snatch Game segment of the show.

In December 2021, the final episode of Collins' podcast on BBC Sounds aired after six series, as well as four series of the Love Lounge spin-off, prior to the former's move to Acast the following year. The same month, she appeared on the Christmas Special episode of The Weakest Link, and was voted off in the second round after incorrectly answering a question about the number of beds in a twin room. Collins also returned to Celebrity MasterChef to compete in the Christmas Cook-Off episode, along with other former contestants Joe Swash, Les Dennis, Mica Paris and Rev. Richard Coles. She first cooked a sticky figgy pudding in which she mistook cranberries for chillies, but was praised for her second dishes of smoked mackerel pâté and festive gnocchi. She did not win the episode, however judge Gregg Wallace described her mushroom, chestnut and brandy sauce as "magnificent".

=== 2022–2023: Self-Harm & Me and The GC's Big Night Out ===
In February 2022, Collins fronted a documentary on Channel 4 titled Gemma Collins: Self-Harm & Me. The documentary followed Collins as she opened up for the first time about her personal relationship with self-harm and saw her speak to experts as they investigated what was behind the rise in cases of self-harm in the United Kingdom. It received positive reviews and Collins was credited for raising the subject of self-harm and for showing audiences a different side to her. It was subsequently nominated within the Authored Documentary category at the 27th National Television Awards. Collins said she was "blown away" by the nomination, reflecting that "it was the scariest thing to be so honest with [herself], however the response [she] got from the show was totally overwhelming. In March 2022, Collins visited her former school Frances Bardsley Academy for Girls, as part of BBC 100's Share Your Story in which various celebrities returned to their old schools to share their experiences and inspire pupils.

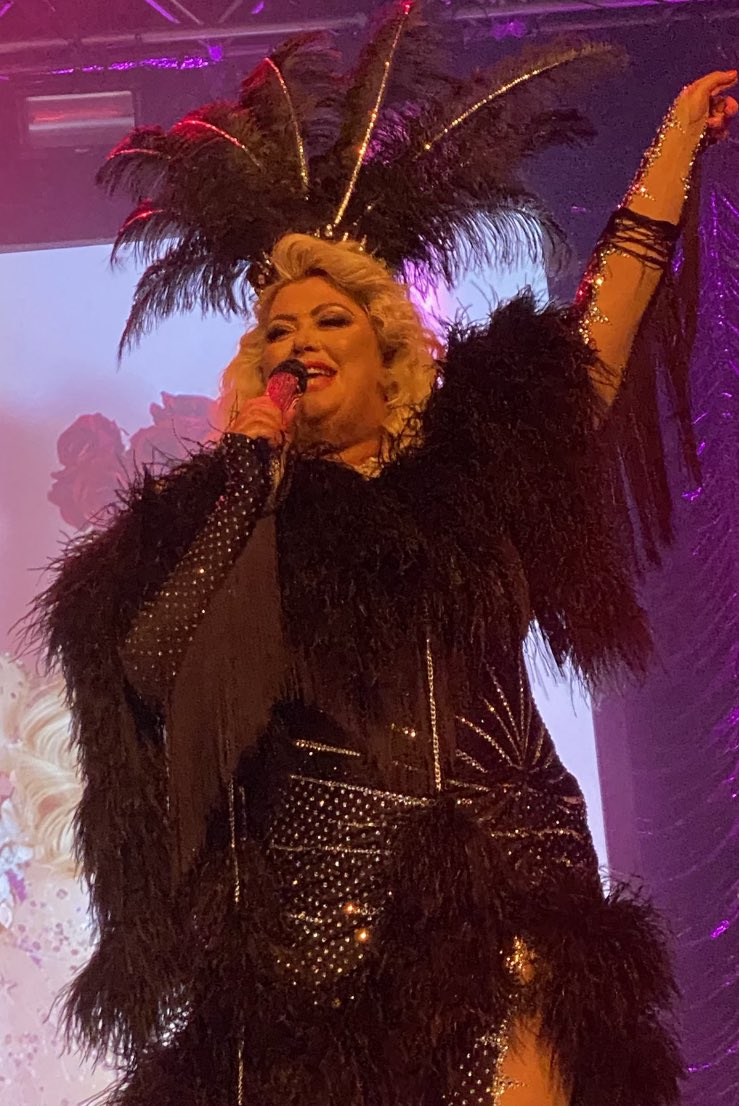
Collins performing during The GC's Big Night Out tour in April 2022

In April 2022, Collins embarked on her first live theatre tour, titled The GC's Big Night Out. Performing in venues across the UK, the seven-date tour was announced on 19 April 2021 and tickets went on sale on 23 April. The tour was originally scheduled to take place between 15–24 October 2021 but was postponed due to logistical issues surrounding the COVID-19 pandemic. The tour began in Manchester on 5 April 2022 and Collins was joined by Stephen Bailey who assumed the role of presenter. The show featured Collins singing, looking back at her life and career and being interviewed by Bailey before taking questions from the audience. She performed in Glasgow, Southampton, London, Birmingham and Cardiff before the tour concluded in Newcastle on 14 April.

In May 2022, Collins was set to take over the role of Matron "Mama" Morton in the UK tour of the musical Chicago. Following the announcement of her casting in March, producer David Ian said "[They] were completely stunned by [Collins'] audition for the role" describing her as "an undeniable force both on and off stage" and that "audiences across the country [were] in for a treat." Collins received criticism from several actors and theatre fans on social media who described her as a "stunt casting". Responding to critics, Collins said she "auditioned for the role and trained really hard" adding that she "didn't just get it because of [her alter ego] the GC". She was scheduled to make her debut in the musical at the Sunderland Empire Theatre on 31 May and was due to perform in Cardiff, Blackpool, Sheffield, Norwich and Oxford on selected dates throughout June and July. However a week before, it was announced that Collins had been forced to withdraw from the production due to a flare up of her knee injury that she sustained whilst competing on Dancing on Ice. She was replaced by singer and Loose Women panellist Brenda Edwards.

In June 2022, Collins appeared in an online segment for the BBC nature series Springwatch. She visited Wild Ken Hill in Norfolk and was accompanied by Chris Packham and Hannah Stitfall, where she discussed her love of plants and wildlife and was advised on how to improve her garden before being given a tour around the site. Collins said she was "honoured" to appear on the show and that she had been overwhelmed by the "beauty of nature". In August 2022, Collins appeared on The Big Breakfast, in a guest segment that featured her assuming the role of an agony aunt and answering viewers' questions. In September 2022, Collins appeared as a guest on the show and was interviewed by Judi Love in the bedroom about her self-confidence, upcoming nuptials as well as dispelling rumours she was set to present the next series of Love Island following an online campaign. Later that month, Collins appeared in marketing campaign for the Channel 4 series Make Me Prime Minister, in which she laid out a satire "GC manifesto" with a list of rules she planned to implement if she became Prime Minister. In October 2022, The Gemma Collins Podcast was relaunched, then produced by Acast, who reportedly offered Collins up to "five-times more" than her BBC salary and granted her more "editorial control". The final episode of her podcast aired in February 2024. In December 2022, Collins appeared on the Channel 4 snow-sculpting competition The Greatest Snowman alongside Gareth Malone, Joe Thomas, Melvin Odoom and Yinka Bokinni, in which she created three sculptures; a unicorn, a team built castle alongside Odoom and Thomas, and a sculpture of herself.

In March 2023, Collins appeared on the S4C series Mwy Na Daffs a Taffs, in which celebrities visited Wales and immersed themselves in Welsh culture, to disprove the preconceptions and prejudices they may have of the country. After meeting with presenter Miriam Isaac, she is accompanied by Ellis Lloyd Jones, known as drag queen Catrin Feelings, to Treorchy high street, where she visited a local café and sampled Welsh cakes and homemade trifle. She then visited family in Abertillery and discussed the fact that her grandfather used to work on building sites with Tom Jones. The following day she attended the 2022 Ceredigion National Eisteddfod in Tregaron where she was given a tour in a buggy, before observing Welsh folk dancing and the Chairing of the Bard ceremony, however decided to walk out of the latter due to the Gorsedd druids' attitude. Collins was forced to leave the remainder of the process due to illness, so Isaac visited her at her home in Essex where she explained that unbeknownst to them, the druids are not supposed to speak before the Chairing ceremony. They subsequently recreated the ceremony in Collins' garden and performed a rendition of the folk song "Yma o Hyd". Reflecting on the experience, Collins said people should be "proud to be Welsh" and encouraged them to "keep the heart of the country and the traditions going". The same month, she appeared on an episode of Would I Lie to You? and was a contestant on The Great Stand Up to Cancer Bake Off, in which she baked a sandwich cake and a treacle tart, prior to the "showstopper" challenge in which the contestants were asked to create a bake using choux pastry to represent an earlier memory. Collins opted to base hers on a memory of her mother taking her shopping to Woolworths to buy a pair of fluffy mules as a child, later changing the bake from a shoe to a handbag. It was criticised by the judges with Prue Leith noting that the pastry was undercooked, whilst Paul Hollywood described it as "appalling but a good effort" with Collins herself calling it a "disaster".

In November 2023, Collins appeared on an episode of Celebrity Antiques Road Trip alongside Odoom. She was paired with antiques expert James Braxton and they purchased six items; a teddy bear, a tea trolley, a 9 carat gold bracelet, a silver charm bracelet, a Georg Jensen A/S silver broach and earrings, and a Baccarat caviar bowl, the latter of which Collins purchased for £30 and sold for £240, ultimately winning her the episode and finishing with an overall amount of £524.86. In December 2023, she appeared on The Real Full Monty: Jingle Balls in which celebrities strip naked and perform to raise money for various cancer charities. Collins decided to take part in the show after her mother found a lump in her breast and said "the thought of my mum, my best friend, having cancer blew my world apart." [...] adding that she was "so lucky to sit here today with [her mother's] breast cancer in remission and that she was doing [The Real Full Monty] for her mum to show her what an absolute queen she was [during treatment]." The same month, she appeared on an episode of Blankety Blank.

=== 2024–present: I'm a Celebrity... South Africa and Everything. All At Once. ===
In April 2024, Collins made a guest appearance on the E4 reality series The Underdog: Josh Must Win, in which contestants believe they are competing on a reality show called The Favourite, however unbeknownst to them, the game is being controlled by Amber Gill, Nick Grimshaw, Pete Wicks and Vicky Pattison who must ensure that Josh, a non-typical reality show contestant, is declared the winner. Collins was enlisted to help with a photoshoot in which she assigned costumes to the contestants and advised them on various different poses. In May 2024, Collins appeared on the Daily Mail's podcast series Everything I Know About Me where she spoke about her life and career. In September 2024, Collins appeared on the BBC genealogy documentary series Who Do You Think You Are?. Collins was keen to learn more about her mother's side of the family, after she was fostered at birth and ultimately discovered that her grandmother was a diagnosed chronic schizophrenic who spent time in two psychiatric hospitals. Throughout the episode, she meets her distant cousins who reside in Dagenham near to where Collins grew up, and sees a photo of her grandmother for the first time. She also discovers that her ancestors lived on Dorset Street in Spitalfields, where Jack the Ripper is believed to have murdered his final victim Mary Jane Kelly in November 1888.

In January 2025, she appeared on an episode of Pointless Celebrities alongside Hayley Hasselhoff, filmed two years prior. Collins correctly identified a photo of Elton John, however Hasselhoff mistook a photo of Debbie Harry for Cyndi Lauper and they were eliminated in the first round with a score of 147. In April 2025, Collins attended the "24 Hour Piano-thon" at Liverpool Street Station which was in promotion of the third series of the Channel 4 music competition show The Piano. Collins played a rendition of Chopsticks on the piano, before performing I Wanna Dance with Somebody (Who Loves Me) by Whitney Houston alongside the Keynotes Choir. In March 2026, after attending the Cheltenham Festival the previous year and not winning anything, Collins returned to the event and ultimately won £20,000 throughout the day, which included £5,000 on one bet after she bet on a horse who won its race with odds of 9/1. In an interview during the ITV Racing coverage, Collins said attending the event had "ignited a fire in her" and encouraged other people, especially women to attend, describing it as "not just a man's sport" and added that she'd probably earn enough money at next year's event to "buy the Cheltenham Racecourse".

In April 2026, Collins returned to I'm a Celebrity, 11 years after her original appearance, to take part in the second series of the "All Stars" spin-off I'm a Celebrity... South Africa, which was filmed in September 2025 and featured campmates from previous series. Collins described her return to the show as "redemption" after withdrawing from her original series, comparing herself to Lara Croft and noted that although the series was tougher this time around, she felt she had "unfinished business" and ultimately "shut it down". She entered camp on the second day of the series alongside Craig Charles, who had also appeared on her original series. Collins completed a helicopter ride into camp, before she and Charles took part in an eating trial, which was won by the latter. She resided in the basic camp "Savannah Scrub" alongside Adam Thomas, Beverley Callard and Seann Walsh for several days, until they joined the main camp after completing a trial in which they were situated in water tanks and had to transport keys to one another. Following her arrival in main camp, Collins fell out of her hammock during one of the episodes. She completed her third trial alongside Scarlett Moffatt, during which time the camp was split into teams. She ultimately lost this trial; however her team the "Rhinos" were victorious and ultimately won a banquet and a trip on safari. Following a safety chain elimination in which Collins was saved by Jimmy Bullard and David Haye was eliminated, Haye then had to choose another campmate to leave alongside him. He chose Collins, who ultimately became the third campmate to be eliminated from the series after spending nine days in camp. The same month, Collins began uploading videos to her own YouTube channel, which included behind the scenes videos of her preparing for events, including the I'm a Celebrity... South Africa final and her visit to the Department of Education, as well as a tour of her shoe closet.

In September 2026, Collins began starring in a Sky One reality series, Gemma Collins: Everything. All At Once., which documented Collins alongside her family as she embarked on IVF treatment and planned her wedding following her engagement to Rami Hawash. The series differed to how it was initially planned, becoming a more personal documentary series which covered Collins' fertility struggles and Hawash's alcohol dependence, as well as their family life. On the commissioning of the show, Collins described the upcoming year as the "most important in her life", and said that "for the first time [in the series] people will get to see the Gemma behind the GC." [...] Collins added that she felt "ready to truly open up, not just about the present, but about [her] past and everything [she'd] been through to become the woman [she is] today. The same month, Collins appeared on an episode of Prue Leith's Cotswold Kitchen, during which she cooked some lamb cutlets with a Parmesan crumb. In October 2026, Collins re-entered the Big Brother house for the twenty-third civilian series as a celebrity house guest, as part of the "House of Power" theme. She entered following the fourth eviction, and resided in the house for two days.

== Business ventures ==
=== Clothing and cosmetics ===
In July 2012, Collins launched her debut plus-size clothing collection online, ranging from sizes 16 to 22. Collins drew on her own experiences of struggling to find flattering and fashionable clothing in larger sizes and said she was "so happy to be able to offer bigger girls a clothing range that they can show their curves off in." In December 2012, Collins attended the Clothes Show Live at the National Exhibition Centre in Birmingham where she had her own stall featuring pieces from her collection that consumers could purchase. She returned to the exhibition the following year and won the award for "Best Designer" at the British Plus Size Awards in 2013. She also teamed up with fashion brand Simply Be to launch her own collection which included a range of bright prints, dresses and jackets, and opened the branches of the store at Highcross Leicester and MetroCentre in Gateshead, cutting the ribbon at the respective launch parties. A year later, Collins opened her own clothing boutique in Brentwood, Essex. She subsequently moved the Gemma Collins Boutique to a different area of Brentwood in November 2014, before returning to the previous location, albeit in a different building, in June 2017. In April 2015, Collins launched her fashion range with women's clothing retailer Evans.

In November 2017, Collins collaborated with fashion website Boohoo.com to release a clothing range aimed at plus-sized women. The following year, she went on to release a collection of swimwear with the retailer. In September 2019, Collins released her debut perfume, Diva Pink. The unisex fragrance has a guaiac wood, saffron, rose and sandalwood scent, and is described as a "sensual fragrance with luxury oud and diva day undertones". Collins has also launched two lipsticks, "Candy" and "Diva" as well as her own range of false eyelashes.

In March 2020, Collins announced her collaboration with fashion company InTheStyle, to release a collection of T-shirts, sweaters, hoodies and pyjamas featuring her viral quotes and memes. Following the success of the range, Collins collaborated with the company again in September, debuting her first plus-size collection with the brand which featured dresses, blouses and a selection of loungewear. During the COVID-19 pandemic, Collins released her own range of hand sanitizers and face masks. Following her weight loss, Collins began selling her old clothes on the online marketplace apps Depop and Vinted.

In March 2021, Collins teamed up with The London Aesthetics Company to release GemmaCollagen, her own anti-ageing collagen supplement and skincare regime. Collins, who is regularly complimented on her skin, worked alongside the company's director Amrit Bhandal to create an ultimate skincare collection which included a cleanser, a toner, a day cream and a facial mask, as well as an eye serum and an amino acid night repair serum. The company also created a marine collagen supplement that included 90 capsules and was said to positively benefit the skin, hair, joints and muscles. The capsules were included in Grazia magazine's Top 10 "Best Collagen Supplements.

In May 2022, fashion retailer New Look posted a short clip on social media of a blonde woman walking down a corridor, with the caption "Our New Look family just gained a new member! Can you guess who it is?". Two days later, it was revealed to be Collins, who signed a deal worth over £1 million to collaborate with the company on a range of clothing. The exclusive collection designed by Collins herself, included bikinis, tops, dresses and jumpsuits available in sizes 8 to 28 that were inspired by "glamorous locations around the world" and also featured a range of jewellery, shoes and accessories. The collection launched online on 16 May, with Collins hosting a launch party in London that evening. It became available in stores three days later and Collins visited the Liverpool One branch where she held auditions for the public to show off their "modelling moves" in hope of being part of the company's autumn/winter campaign. Following her collaboration with the company, Collins made the decision to close down her clothing boutique after nine years, and at the time of its closure, was the longest-standing of her The Only Way Is Essex co-stars businesses. In June 2022, she collaborated with the hair care brand Aussie to promote their "Deeep Moisture" range. Collins, a consumer of the product herself said that the conditioner had "come to the rescue" after her previous desire to be the "blondest person on the earth" had left her with "dry, damaged locks". In March 2023, Collins collaborated with Seventy Hyal 2000 to promote their skin boosting product, in which she appeared in a series of online advertisement campaigns as well as on a billboard alongside a phone number, encouraging consumers to call "The Hydration Hotline".

In April 2024, Collins collaborated with the cosmetics brand e.l.f., during which she rode a rollercoaster whilst applying the brand's SKIN Bronzing Drops in a video promoting the product. In October 2024, Collins partnered with Superdrug and was appointed "The Beauty Boss" in a campaign promoting the store's seasonal offering and in-store beauty services. Of the collaboration, Collins said she was "so excited about the partnership [...] because since [she was] a young girl [Superdrug] was her go-to place". As part of her role, Collins also fronted a YouTube mini-series in which she explored the companies' products and was joined by special guests including Chloe Sims, whom she had a conversation with whilst receiving beauty treatments.

In February 2025, Collins collaborated with the sportswear brand TLC Sport to front their "Find Your Supermodel" campaign and launch a new collection of activewear. The brand subsequently put out a casting call for thirty women to join her for a photoshoot as part of the launch, in which they used no editing or airbrushing on the photos. Collins praised the brand as "inclusive" and encouraged consumers to "empower each other to be [their] best selves".

=== Products and endorsements ===
In April 2018, Collins collaborated with the hair care brand Coco & Eve, for which she appeared in a campaign that recreated Kim Kardashian's front cover of Paper magazine. Whilst Kardashian appears with a champagne glass on her bottom, Collins instead poses with one of the companies hair masks on hers. In November 2018, Collins collaborated with Mark Hill Hair, in which she attended Boots as a beauty brand consultant and dressed in the company uniform to promote their "5 for £50 Pick 'n' Mix" offer on hair curlers for Black Friday. In May 2019, Collins teamed up with Just Eat to appear in an online advert where she tried the new chicken fries from Burger King to promote the latest addition to their menu, that were available on the food delivery service.

In April 2020, Collins collaborated with the company Cocoa Plus to release her own range of chocolate bars. She has since released other confectionery including luxury truffles, an advent calendar, and an Easter egg. In July 2020, Collins became the face of low-cost airline Wizz Air. Upon being appointed brand ambassador, Collins said "Anyone who knows me knows I am all about holidays, so Wizz have come to the right person for some travel inspo! Whether it's siestas and fiestas in Marbs or sunbathing and dancing through the night on a Greek Island, I have got a tip or two up my sleeve. Now we can all fly like the GC!". In October, Collins collaborated with Zymurgorium, a distillery in Manchester, to launch her own premium gin liqueur as part of the company's "FlaGINgo" range. In November 2020, Collins partnered with the online casino PlayOJO to launch a faux fragrance, in order to raise awareness that problem gambling is the "addiction with no smell". She admitted that the campaign was close to her heart having previously been around addicts in her life. In December 2020, Collins assisted with the launch of the free-to-play lottery app Bravospeed, for which she appeared in an online advertisement in academic dress explaining the app's rules.

In July 2021, Collins teamed up with Durex alongside Ollie Locke and Alix Fox to create the Roadmap to Sexual Satisfaction, a guide in which she provided her tips and advice for getting physical, saying that "Confidence [was] the key to positive, satisfying, intimacy" and that "sexiness comes from within". In May 2022, Collins announced she was working with the brand again to support the launch of their new range of sex toys. She promoted three different vibrators and expressed the importance of "self-love" adding that the use of sex toys was "empowering" and that she wanted to help break the taboo around talking about them. In August 2021, Collins was announced as the new face of the laundry detergent brand Surf and released her own limited edition detergent and capsules as part of the company's "Diva Divine" range, exclusive to Asda supermarkets. In October 2021, Collins became a speaker at Big Business Events, a business development service in which she offered her tips for business growth and shared her own experiences during a 3-day live event. In November 2021, Collins announced her collaboration with Amazon Handmade, in which she worked with interior designers Paul Moneypenny and Siobhan Murphy to create a bespoke 33-piece collection featuring homeware, skincare and other gift items, titled the Gemma Collins & Friends Christmas Collection. In December 2021, Collins took part in a debate at the Oxford Union which was part of an advertising campaign for Sainsbury's. She argued that modern and alternative dishes should be served on Christmas Day as opposed to traditional Christmas food and stated that younger generations such as Gen Z would prefer unconventional dishes, endorsing the supermarket's festive food selection. Collins won the debate and said she "had a brilliant time debating at the Oxford Union, it was an absolute dream come true for me", adding that "We should embrace the newness, new taste, new traditions." On 8 and 9 December, Collins took part in "On Trend", a shopping experience broadcast live on TikTok. As part of the two-day event, Collins featured alongside influencers and content creators to promote products that viewers could purchase.

In May 2022, Collins announced her collaboration with snack food manufacturer Walkers as part of their "Crisp In or Crisp Out" campaign. Collins featured in an advert alongside Ed Balls, Nigella Lawson, Gordon Ramsay and Fred Sirieix with Collins and Lawson arguing to "keep crisps in" sandwiches. On 19 June, Collins visited the town of Sandwich in Kent where she debated against Sirieix, who was canvassing to "keep crisps out". The residents of Sandwich then cast their votes on whether crisps should be kept in or out, with the majority choosing the former, resulting in Collins winning the debate and being crowned "President of Sandwich". In July 2022, Collins collaborated with the freemium online board and card game Bingo Blitz. As part of the collaboration, she was set a week of challenges to promote the game which consisted of Collins explaining her morning routine, performing a jazzercise dance to Meghan Trainor's "All About That Game", visiting Leicester Square to distribute Bingo Blitz merchandise, answering trivia questions and delivering a motivational closing speech to her fans, who had the opportunity to win £1,000 towards a night out by entering a giveaway. In December 2022, after attending the Malibu Courtside Confessions event earlier in the year, Collins collaborated with the liqueur brand Malibu, in which she appeared in a range of videos on social media, encouraging consumers to submit their Christmas wishes to her. Of the collaboration, Collins said: "I'm all about mixing up Christmas traditions – it's a time of year that should be all about you and that's why I'm teaming up with Malibu to grant people's Christmas wishes this year". Collins described Malibu as her "absolute favourite drink" and subsequently relayed her own wish, "a "GC" version of Santa's sleigh, in bright pink, with unicorns instead of reindeer, filled with disco goodies, that could fly around the world in one night". She added "Could you imagine how many Christmas parties I could then go to?! So, this year, if you'd like a little bit of Malibu fairy dust to make your Christmas season sparkle – don't ask Santa, ask me (the GC)!"

In April 2023, Collins began fronting a campaign for the menstrual hygiene brand Always, in which she promoted their "Always Discreet" sanitary products. Collins, who has suffered with urinary incontinence herself, said of the collaboration that she wanted to "help break down the stigma around the subject for women", describing it as "a taboo subject" and said that "it's really sad to know that women are stopping doing their activities because of leaks." Collins said she was "so surprised to find out how many women, just like [her], [were] also experiencing bladder leaks" adding that she had previously "held back on doing things [she enjoyed], like trampolining, riding a bike or working out, and dancing the night away with friends, because [she] was worried about bladder leaks" and that "since learning that pelvic floor exercises can help to manage them, and using pads for those moments when [she needed] more protection, [she] no longer [had] to hold back." Collins continued to collaborate with the brand over the following year to "get women talking and empower those experiencing bladder leaks to live life without compromise" and subsequently discussed her own experience on This Morning.

In July 2023, she collaborated with the internet service provider Plusnet, for which she assumed the role of an agony aunt and answered queries from the public in an online video segment titled "Gemma's Dilemmas". Collins said of her role: "From technology mishaps to fashion disasters, I know what it's like to deal with daily frustrations and so this is why I am launching my new campaign, Gemma's Dilemmas, to give my advice to the nation and solve their problems – one step at a time. Keeping things simple is the key to a happy life babes, so let's hope the nation takes a leaf out of my book." In August 2023, Collins partnered with the pizza chain Papa John's in which she was appointed "Head of Cheese" and attended a branch of the restaurant dressed in the company uniform to oversee the staff and promote their "Crispy Cheese Base" flavour pizza. In the online promotion video, Collins told a series of "cheese related" jokes and assisted a staff member in making a pizza before handing them out to the public on the street. In September 2023, Collins collaborated with TK Maxx to promote their "quiet luxury" clothing trend, which consisted of "sophisticated, low key, and timeless clothing often associated with neutral tones, soft and tactile materials, and a polished aesthetic." Collins visited the Watford branch of the company as part of their "There's No Deal Like a TK Deal" campaign, where she browsed the store and was subsequently photographed in two outfits. Of the collaboration, Collins said: "Everyone knows I'm a big personality with a bold personal style to match, but I wanted to shake things up in the most unexpected way and show everyone the GC can tone down her look, without toning down her character." She added, "Neutral colours and simpler pieces are obviously worlds apart from my usual look, but I've genuinely loved seeing how I could do quiet luxury – who knew I could ever do anything "quiet" eh?" Later that month, Collins began broadcasting live on TikTok in colloboration with TikTok Shop and over the next year, engaged in live videos with various companies on the app to promote a variety of products including clothing, cosmetics, jewellery, homewares and confectionary, as well as items from her own fashion and beauty ranges. In November 2023, Collins collaborated with Dr Pepper as part of their "Try More Weird" campaign to promote "Dr Pepper Zero" in which she engaged in a social media video alongside Jedward where they pretended to dye her hair the brand's dark pink colour. Collins took part in a promotional photoshoot wearing a red wig whilst holding a can of the drink and said "Dr Pepper Zero are encouraging people to get out of their comfort zone and Try More Weird [...] So, this is me doing something that I never thought I'd do and turning my iconic blonde locks the colour of the new Dr Pepper Zero can! You guys know how much I love Dr Pepper Zero so I'm so excited to be part of this campaign and encourage you all to try something you never thought you would! Starting with an ice cold can of Dr P!". She collaborated with the company again in February 2025, to promote the "Cherry Crush Zero Sugar" flavour, in which she and Jedward attempted a Guinness World Record to see how many post-it notes they could attach to her within a minute. The attempt, which was overseen by an adjudicator, saw them attach 30, failing to break the record of 70.

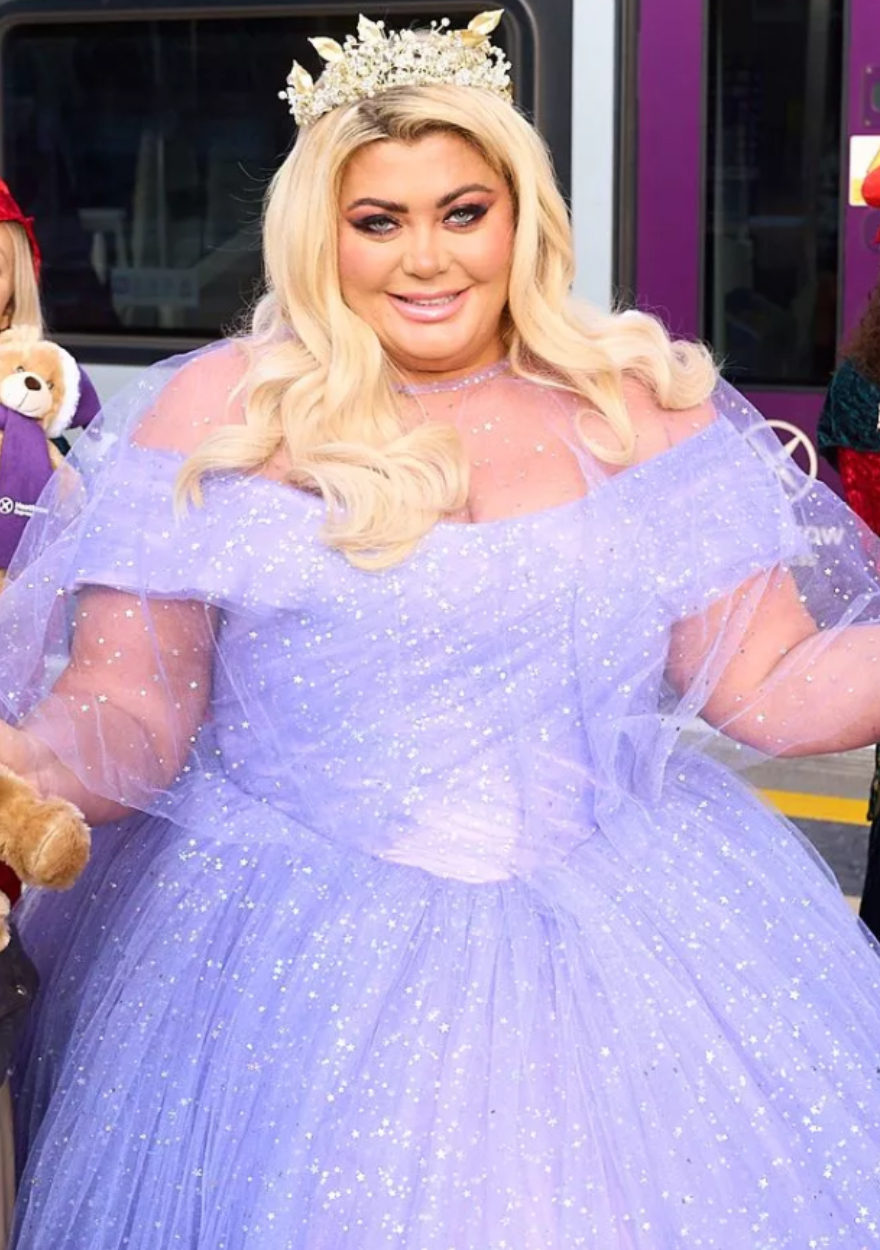
Collins opening the new Elf Concierge Service at Heathrow Express in December 2023

In December 2023, Collins visited Heathrow Express at London Paddington station where she dressed as a fairy godmother to help promote their "Elf Concierge Service", alongside staff dressed elves who were there to assist passengers with their luggage and offer travel advice. Collins cut the ribbon to open the service and handed out teddy bears to the public. Speaking of the experience, Collins said: "It's been great to help Heathrow Express launch their Christmas Elf Concierge service. I love this time of year and getting to spend it with family and friends. Hopping on board your train, safe in the knowledge that you've got a very cute teddy to gift a loved one at the other end is a really fun and lovely thing to do". In March 2024, following her engagement the previous month, Collins collaborated with the online wedding planning company Hitched, in which she a compiled a "wedding wishlist" using vendors from the companies marketplace to decide her ideal venue, transportation, catering, entertainment, flowers, photographer, wedding planner and decorations. In June 2024, as part of National Bingo Week, Collins appeared at a bingo club in Stratford, London and served as their bingo caller for the day. She encouraged people to "support their local bingo clubs", describing it as a "fun and cheap night out". In September 2024, Collins fronted a campaign for Pension Attention in which she appeared in an advert for a parody face cream, encouraging the public to "pay their pension some attention". Collins also appeared on Sky News alongside Iona Bain, the founder of Young Money Blog, to discuss the campaign, which ultimately won The PRWeek Corporate Affairs Award for "Best Use of Social Media and/or Influencers" in the "Corporate and/or City" category. The same month, she partnered with Models of Diversity to appear in a billboard campaign alongside a group of other women, raising awareness about the lack of diversity within fashion weeks. Collins said of the campaign that she was "Getting a bit sick of the fashion industry still not letting plus-size women walk the runways" adding that she felt "plus-size fashion was at an all time low" and that she was "shocked by how bad the regular sites had become". In November 2024, Collins attended the Swansea Christmas Parade as part of a collaboration with McDonald's for their "Gift Drop" campaign. For the event, she dressed in a red ball gown and offered the public the chance to try items from the companies' Festive Menu ahead of its launch, serving from a food van. In December 2024, after collaborating with Baileys Irish Cream and appearing at one of their events earlier in the year, she hosted The Baileys Christmas Sip and Sing event where she performed alongside The Gold Collective choir. Of the event, Collins said: "Tis the season to Baileys, honey! Christmas is all about bringing people together for a bit of festive joy, a Christmas singalong, and of course, some Baileys".

In June 2025, Collins collaborated with the motorised kitchen appliances company Ninja to promote their slushy machine Ninja SLUSHi. In a social media video promoting the product, Collins was appointed the "GCEO" and expresses her distaste in the employees slushy ideas at a board meeting, before introducing her own that are based on her, named the "Gemma Tom Collins" and "Brentwood Bellini" respectively. The same month, she collaborated with Trainline and attended King's Cross Station to promote their "Slaystation" service, a pop-up experience where commuters were able to get their hair and make-up done. In July 2025, Collins appeared in an online advertisement campaign for Sky Mobile, for which she fronted a satire video apologising about accidentally "oversharing" details about her wedding, before revealing she was "not sorry" and subsequently endorsed them for allowing users of the network to share their mobile data. As part of the partnership, Collins said "Oversharing is caring huns, don't stress about it – I've overshared all my life and I love it. Now with Sky Mobile, we can share even more – by gifting data so that those you love can keep the group chats going strong!" In October 2025, Collins starred in an advertisement for the gambling company Paddy Power alongside Danny Dyer and Coleen Rooney, in which Collins makes her way through a casino calling after Dyer, referencing her famous meme exclaiming "I'm claustrophobic Danny" before telling Rooney to "have a day off hun". In November 2025, Collins collaborated with the online retail service AliExpress as part of their "See the Signs 11.11" campaign, which saw her attend a pop-up event in Soho where she partook in a live stream and assisted with the promotion of their products, as well as selecting a random winner to receive a giant Labubu. In February 2026, Collins collaborated with the proprietary software company Canva. She appeared in a mockumentary-style video as part of their brand campaign, in which Collins is appointed the creative director of the company and is seen at the headquarters testing out several of their design tools and features, as well as a limited-edition version of their Magic Write tool based on her, "ChatGC", which allowed users to change their text to mirror something Collins would say.

== Public image ==
=== Alter ego ===
During her time on The Only Way Is Essex, Collins earned a reputation for being a diva. Her alter-ego was first created during the show's third series when her co-star Sam Faiers referred to Collins using her initials "The GC". Collins describes her alter-ego as an "intervention" and says she and The GC are "very different people". Speaking in 2020, she said "Although I'm Gemma Collins, I've got my brand the GC. Gemma Collins is a homely girl who loves watering hanging baskets. The GC, which is my brand, is basically a character that's over the top that people either love her or hate her, but on the back of her I've managed to launch perfumes and lipsticks." Collins embraces the term "diva" and says the word "empowers her". Her influences include Marilyn Monroe, Lucille Ball, Judy Garland, Madonna, Beyoncé, Mariah Carey and Dolly Parton.

=== Humanitarian work ===
Collins is a supporter of animal rights. She has appeared in numerous campaigns for the animal rights organisation PETA. In 2013, she posed naked for the "I'd Rather Go Naked Than Wear Fur" campaign. In 2020, Collins was photographed in a bathtub to highlight the fact that marine animals are separated from their families and confined to concrete tanks. In 2021, she posed with a skinned fox as she backed the campaign to end the fur trade in the United Kingdom. Addressing then prime minister Boris Johnson, Collins said "Take it from an icon, Boris – no one needs fur in their wardrobe. Do the right thing – ban fur imports and sales. Let's wear our skin and let the animals keep theirs." Speaking on her podcast, Collins expressed her interest in becoming a humanitarian and said she wishes to promote conservation and animal welfare to the next generation. In November 2022, Collins opened a newly refurbished Cats Protection adoption centre in Chelmsford, during which she was given a tour and the opportunity to name one of the cats, which she named after Mr. Mistoffelees from Cats. Following the re-opening, Collins said she was "putting out a plea to help these amazing people give cats a home". In March 2023, Collins assisted with the launch of the Be A Cat Cafe in Soho, a pop-up experience from cat food brand Felix. Attending the event, Collins said "I'm here for cattitude and think that if people tried being more like a cat, they'd be a lot more chilled out and relaxed".

In June 2023, Collins attended the Animal Ball at Lancaster House in support of Elephant Family, a charity dedicated to protecting the Asian elephant from extinction. During the event, she met Charles III and Queen Camilla, with whom she discussed her elephant sculptures she purchased in support of the organisation, before inviting them to go on a safari with her. Collins has been a long-time supporter of Camp Beagle, a protest camp set up by animal rights activists who campaign for the closure of MBR Acres, a breeding facility for beagles used in laboratory research. In February 2024, she gave a speech at the rally outside of the Houses of Parliament where she encouraged people to "keep making noise" about MBR Acres and vowed to "Save the Beagles" by ensuring its closure, prior to attending the parliamentary debate to ban toxicology tests on animals. In April 2024, Collins became an ambassador for "Bark for Our Parks", a campaign for the charity Fields in Trust which protects parks and green spaces. The campaign encouraged owners and their dogs to embark on walking 50km or 100km as part of a fundraiser. Speaking of the campaign, Collins said she was "so excited to be welcomed into the Fields in Trust family as a Bark For Our Parks ambassador", and added that "the highlight of [her dog] Blue's day, and often her own was exploring their local parks and green spaces, so [she was] really happy that [she got] to be a part of this wonderful initiative helping to make sure our walkies will be here forever. Bring on the challenge." In October 2024, Collins endorsed the National Fostering Group, supporting their campaign for more foster carers in the United Kingdom. Speaking alongside her mother, who was fostered as a child, Collins said she was considering becoming a foster carer, and urged others to do so. In November 2024, Collins attended the Southport Festive Fun Day, where she performed "Rockin' Around the Christmas Tree".

In May 2026, Collins visited the Department for Education, and appeared in a series of social media videos as part of a campaign, in the first of which she is seen arriving at the department accompanied by music from The Devil Wears Prada. After heading upstairs in the lift, Collins enters the offices and says "Right, what are we doing to help the children?" to which Bridget Phillipson, the Secretary of State for Education opens the door to her office and invites her in for a chat. During their conversation, Collins tells Phillipson how she failed her GCSE Maths exam due to not believing in herself and finding it stressful, however discussed her love for subjects including English, Art and History, specifically learning about Richard III of England. Having left school with minimal qualifications herself, she quizzed Phillipson on how they would ensure children in a similar position were not left behind. Phillipson explained how the government's aim was to ensure that children were able to develop vocational skills for their future careers as well as academic ones, with the introduction of V Levels. Collins went on to speak about her life and career, discussing her early jobs and how they helped with independence, as well as her love of reading books by Enid Blyton as a child. She also spoke about the changes and how times had moved on since she was at school, endorsing a ban on mobile phones for under-16's, as well as encouraging children to "get a craft behind them and a skill set" and to follow a career path they were passionate about. Collins also suggested that they be taught life and money management skills, before concluding by stating that if she was Secretary of State for Education, she'd deliver a morning motivational message via the television. Collins was not paid for the campaign. The Department for Education received criticism for using Collins in the social media campaign, with some suggesting that the videos "trivialised issues in care for children with Special educational needs (SEN)". Phillipson defended Collins however, stating that some of the criticism had been "outright snobbery and just downright unpleasant", arguing that Collins had a reach "politicians [couldn't] reach". Collins subsequently visited Focus 1st Academy in London, a school specialising in pupils with SEN, with whom she met and delivered a speech to. The school's headteacher Marina Savva described Collins as "one of the most uplifting inspirational speakers we've ever had". Speaking of the campaign and her visit, Collins said that although she was "not an expert", the subject was "close to her heart" as she had had her own experiences dealing with SEN and said she would continue to spread encouragement and positivity, stating that she was "creating a lot of noise about the subject. That is what [she was] there to do.

=== Media presence ===
Collins has been a subject of press and tabloid attention since she first began appearing on The Only Way Is Essex in 2011. Her battle with her weight is something that has been widely documented throughout her career, however she has been consistently praised for her confidence, and has promoted body positivity and encouraged women to love themselves no matter what their size.

Collins has a large following on social media, having amassed over 2 million followers on Instagram and over 1 million on Twitter. Such is her popularity, she is often paid to promote products and businesses on her pages and can earn up to £75,000 in one day from social media posts. Collins has stated that she only endorses products that she believes in.

Collins is widely known for her diva meltdowns and recognisable catchphrases during her appearances on television and in the media, and as a result became the subject of numerous internet memes. She was branded the "meme queen" by the BBC whilst Peter Robinson of The Guardian described her as a "social media powerhouse who has literally made a meme out of mispronouncing the word meme".

Collins is a staple of the "hun subculture" and has been regarded as the "Queen of Huns". Her popularity within the LGBT community has seen her make various appearances at nightclubs and events including G-A-Y and Glitterbomb. In June 2023, she performed at the Mighty Hoopla event in Brockwell Park. In July 2024, Collins attended a Belfast Pride event as part of BPerfect Cosmetics Rave 4 Pride, in which she judged a talent competition and attempted DJing. She is the most frequently impersonated celebrity on the Snatch Game on RuPaul's Drag Race UK, having been portrayed by Cheryl Hole and Kitty Scott-Claus in the first and third series respectively.

Collins has gone viral on social media several times. On one such occasion in July 2017, she attended the ITV Summer Party wearing an outfit designed by Gerda Truubon. The orange ruched dress with gold chain detailing gained attention due to the distinctive large shoulder pads. Several memes and comparisons were made, with comedian Alan Carr later dressing up as Collins for Jonathan Ross' Halloween party. She also gained notoriety for her falls at the BBC Radio 1 Teen Awards and on Dancing on Ice, the former of which was included in the "Fall of Shame" segment on The Wendy Williams Show in America. In August 2020, Collins was referenced in the Sky Atlantic series I Hate Suzie, featuring in the Instagram feed of the title character Suzie Pickles (Billie Piper)'s stalker. In September 2020, Collins was nominated for the Nobel Peace Prize by online pranksters Josh Pieters and Archie Manners. In a letter to the Norwegian Nobel Institute, they cited Collins falling through the stage as an "act of unification" for the nation, and claimed that the "GC effect" could bring peace to North Korea. Following the successful nomination, Collins said she was "surprised and overwhelmed", and although she "couldn't see why someone would want to nominate [her]", she added that she was "all about world peace [...] love conquers all. Peace is everything".

In late 2022, during her travel to Israel with fiancé Rami Hawash, Collins shared media from her visit to the Church of the Nativity in Bethlehem, describing herself as "overcome with emotion" at the biblical birthplace of Jesus. She has also spoken about her beliefs in spiritualism on multiple podcasts.

== Personal life ==
Collins lives in Roxwell, Chelmsford in a barn conversion which she bought for £1.35 million in 2021. She has described the house as her "dream home" and has had multiple renovations including a swimming pool and a summer house. Collins enjoys gardening and has expressed her love of plants, as well as her passion for animals and nature. She has two dogs and two cats, as well as chickens. Collins has several life-size animal sculptures inside her home and in her garden, including a horse with a disco ball and a giraffe lamp, as well as a wooden Asian mother elephant and its calf, the former of which she donated £22,000 to CoExistence, an environmental art campaign conceptualised by the Elephant Family.

=== Relationships ===
In 2012, Collins dated fellow The Only Way Is Essex cast member Charlie King. During their relationship, she had suspicions that King was gay. He later came out in 2014. Following their split, Collins began a relationship with Rami Hawash, whom she had previously dated in 2011, and the pair became engaged on 25 December 2013; however, the engagement was called off a few weeks later. In November 2014, Collins was assaulted by her then boyfriend, Alexander Moss, at her former home in Warley. Reflecting on the incident in 2017, she said her biggest regret was not pressing charges because she was "too scared to see it through". Collins briefly dated James Argent in 2012, before reuniting with ex-boyfriend, Rami. The pair reconciled in December 2017 when Argent professed his love for Collins during The Only Way Is Essexmas and they were in an on-and-off relationship until July 2020. Argent struggled with cocaine addiction which resulted in the breakdown of their relationship. Collins said Argent's addiction made her feel "suicidal" and caused her to suffer from post-traumatic stress disorder as a result.

In December 2020, Collins rekindled her relationship with ex-fiancé, Rami Hawash, a British-Israeli businessman. They reconnected again after attending a Madonna concert together. In July 2021, Collins confirmed their reunion after she was spotted wearing her engagement ring several months prior. During an interview with The Times in December 2021, Collins announced that the pair were planning to get re-engaged however were waiting for the completion of Hawash's divorce to his previous wife, whom Collins has a good relationship with and acts as stepmother to their son. Collins also discussed her plans to have a baby with Hawash as well as a television show to document the pregnancy and baby's birth. In February 2024, Collins and Hawash became engaged for the second time after he proposed to her on a beach during their holiday in the Maldives.

=== Health ===
The first time I cut myself, my mum and dad were in the kitchen, I did it in front of them. I just got a knife and cut my hand. I felt really pressured and really stressed. There's nothing I can pinpoint, I was just depressed. To be honest, this is going to sound really strange but it was just this release. I didn't understand what I was doing I just knew it was wrong and something I didn't want to talk about.

— Collins on her first experience with self-harm in her documentary Gemma Collins: Self-Harm & Me.

Collins began self-harming as a teenager and did so until her early thirties. The first time she engaged in self-harm was at the age of 13 when she picked up a knife and cut her hand in front of her parents. In 2004, Collins had an abortion when she was around three months pregnant after doctors told her that her baby would most likely be born intersex and was therefore advised to terminate the pregnancy. Following this, she discovered that her then boyfriend, a stockbroker, with whom she had been together with for several years, was having an affair, resulting in the break down of their relationship. Collins recalled an incident where she slashed her hand open with a kitchen knife to deal with the pain of "grieving for [her] baby and [her] relationship". She also suffered from anxiety attacks and began binge-eating.

Collins suffers from polycystic ovary syndrome and in January 2012, she suffered a miscarriage and gave birth to a four and a half month old foetus on her landing the day before she attended the 17th National Television Awards. In July 2020, Collins suffered a third miscarriage, which she initially suspected to be a heavy period, after which she wrote an open letter to Meghan, Duchess of Sussex detailing her struggles with infertility and thanking her for her "bravery and honesty" for opening up about her own miscarriage. Collins previously admitted her fear about never becoming a mother but has said she "won't give up hope" and hopes to conceive naturally one day.

Collins has battled with her weight since her early twenties, and also suffers from an underactive thyroid. In 2015, Collins underwent surgery to have a designer vagina which cost £2,000. During her appearance on Dancing on Ice in 2019, Collins lost over two stone and continued to lose weight after adapting a more balanced diet and exercise regime. She regularly posted workout videos and shared her fitness journey on social media. In 2020, she announced that she was planning to have a breast reduction. In 2021, Collins had her botox and fillers removed, stating that she "didn't look like herself" and wanted to instead opt for a more natural look.

== Filmography ==
As herself
Year	Title	Notes	Ref.
2011–2019	The Only Way Is Essex	Series regular; 2–25	
2014	Splash!	Contestant; series 2	
2014	I'm a Celebrity...Get Me Out of Here!	Contestant; series 14	
2016	Celebrity Big Brother	Housemate; series 17	
2017	Sugar Free Farm	Participant; series 2	
2017	Big Brother	Guest housemate; series 18	
2018	Celebs Go Dating	Main cast; series 4	
2018	Celebrity MasterChef	Contestant; series 13	
2018	All Together Now, Celebrities	Finalist	
2018–2020	Gemma Collins: Diva	Lead role	
2019	Dancing on Ice	Contestant; series 11	
2022	Gemma Collins: Self-Harm & Me	Documentary	
2023	The Real Full Monty: Jingle Balls	Participant	
2026	I'm a Celebrity... South Africa	Contestant; series 2	
2026	Gemma Collins: Everything. All At Once.	Lead role	
2026	Big Brother	Guest housemate; series 23	

=== Guest appearances ===
- Snobs (13 January 2000) – 1 episode
- Loose Women (16 September 2011, 1 March 2012, 26 April 2013, 3 October 2013, 24 February 2014, 4 February 2016, 4 March 2016, 3 March 2017, 6 April 2017, 7 September 2017, 2 March 2018, 27 June 2018, 11 February 2019, 20 February 2019, 19 March 2019, 6 August 2020) – 16 episodes
- I'm a Celebrity...Get Me Out of Here! NOW! (23–25 November 2011, 16 November 2015) – 4 episodes
- Peter Andre: My Life (14 December 2011) – 1 episode
- That Sunday Night Show (8 January 2012) – 1 episode
- Celebrity Juice (15 March 2012, 9 May 2013, 11 April 2019, 24 October 2019, 12 November 2020) – 5 episodes
- This Morning (30 March 2012, 2 April 2012, 4 April 2012, 31 August 2012, 19 September 2012, 18 January 2013, 5 April 2013, 19 April 2013, 24 April 2013, 28 November 2014, 3 December 2014, 4 December 2014, 13 May 2015, 5 February 2016, 4 July 2016, 2 August 2016, 30 April 2018, 1 October 2018, 7 January 2019, 23 January 2019, 4 February 2019, 11 February 2019, 14 August 2019, 18 December 2019, 28 June 2024) – 25 episodes
- The Big Quiz (15 April 2012) – 1 episode
- 8 Out of 10 Cats (15 June 2012, 25 January 2013, 28 January 2020) – 3 episodes
- Big Brother's Bit on the Side (4 July 2012, 28 July 2013, 13 May 2015, 16 June 2017) – 4 episodes
- Let's Do Lunch with Gino & Mel (29 August 2012) – 1 episode
- Celebrity Big Brother's Bit on the Side (6 September 2012, 9 January 2013, 1 September 2013, 19 August 2014, 29 January 2015, 2 February 2016, 4–5 February 2016, 1 August 2017) – 9 episodes
- Fake Reaction (3 January 2013) – 1 episode
- 8 Out of 10 Cats Does Deal or No Deal (4 January 2013) – 1 episode
- Food Glorious Food (24 April 2013) – 1 episode
- Sunday Side Up (29 December 2013) – 1 episode
- Who's Doing the Dishes? (3 October 2014) – 1 episode
- Phillip's Live 24-Hour TV Marathon (1 December 2014) – 1 episode
- Mel & Sue (14 January 2015) – 1 episode
- If Katie Hopkins Ruled the World (6 August 2015) – 1 episode
- Kendra on Top (21 August 2015) – 1 episode
- Keep It in the Family (22 August 2015) – 1 episode
- Safeword (27 August 2015) – 1 episode
- Tina Malone: My New Body (1 October 2015) – 1 episode
- Tricked (27 October 2015) – 1 episode
- The Wright Stuff (4 February 2016) – 1 episode
- Virtually Famous (8 March 2016) – 1 episode
- In Therapy (5 July 2016) – 1 episode
- It's Not Me, It's You (29 July 2016) – 1 episode
- Sky News (25 October 2016, 6 September 2024) – 2 episodes
- Alan Carr's Specstacular (31 December 2016) – 1 episode
- Through the Keyhole (4 February 2017) – 1 episode
- BBC Radio 1 Teen Awards (22 October 2017, 21 October 2018)
- Celebrity 100% Hotter (25 January 2018) – 1 episode
- The Generation Game (1 April 2018) – 1 episode
- Livin' with Lucy (10 September 2018) – 1 episode
- ReFreshers Week Presented By Strongbow (1 October 2018) – 1 episode
- Your Face or Mine? (3 October 2018) – 1 episode
- Good Morning Britain (30 October 2018, 19 December 2018, 4 February 2019, 1 April 2019, 24 June 2019, 7 August 2019, 13 November 2019, 25 November 2019, 8 December 2020) – 9 episodes
- I'll Get This (4 December 2018) – 1 episode
- Lorraine (4 January 2019, 18 January 2019, 23 January 2019, 8 March 2019, 9 September 2019, 30 September 2019, 15 November 2019, 11 December 2023) – 8 episodes
- The Jonathan Ross Show (9 March 2019) – 1 episode
- The Real Housewives of Cheshire (22 April 2019, 11 November 2019) – 2 episodes
- The Crystal Maze (21 June 2019) – 1 episode
- Celebrity Catchphrase (31 August 2019) – 1 episode
- MTV Cribs UK (16 September 2019, 7 December 2020) – 2 episodes
- Dancing on Ice at Christmas (22 December 2019) – 1 episode
- The Big Narstie Show (7 February 2020) – 1 episode
- Inside Missguided: Made in Manchester (12 August 2020) – 1 episode
- Rolling In It (15 August 2020) – 1 episode
- Shopping with Keith Lemon (25 October 2020) – 1 episode
- Celebrity Supply Teacher (17 November 2020) – 1 episode
- The Wheel (19 December 2020, 18 December 2021) – 2 episodes
- Dancing on Ice (24 January 2021) – 1 episode
- Piers Morgan's Life Stories (11 February 2021) – 1 episode
- RuPaul's Drag Race UK (18 February 2021) – 1 episode
- Mel Giedroyc: Unforgivable (23 February 2021) – 1 episode
- Sophie Ellis-Bextor's Kitchen Disco Danceathon (16 November 2021) – 1 episode
- Angela Scanlon's Ask Me Anything (27 November 2021) – 1 episode
- The Weakest Link (23 December 2021) – 1 episode
- Celebrity MasterChef: Christmas Cook-Off (23 December 2021) – 1 episode
- The Travel Show (4 February 2022) – 1 episode
- Springwatch (8 June 2022) – 1 episode
- The Big Breakfast (20 August 2022, 27 August 2022, 3 September 2022) – 3 episodes
- The Great Scott TreadMills Challenge (16 November 2022) – 1 episode
- The Greatest Snowman (26 December 2022) – 1 episode
- Mwy Na Daffs a Taffs (2 March 2023) – 1 episode
- Would I Lie to You? (24 March 2023) – 1 episode
- The Great Stand Up to Cancer Bake Off (26 March 2023) – 1 episode
- Late Night Lycett (14 April 2023) – 1 episode
- Steph's Packed Lunch (16 May 2023) – 1 episode
- The Comedy Roast for SU2C (3 November 2023) – 1 episode
- Celebrity Antiques Road Trip (28 November 2023) – 1 episode
- Blankety Blank (23 December 2023) – 1 episode
- The Underdog: Josh Must Win (3 April 2024) – 1 episode
- Drama Queens (1 May 2024) – 1 episode
- Who Do You Think You Are? (26 September 2024) – 1 episode
- Katy Perry: Night of a Lifetime (21 December 2024) – 1 episode
- Pointless Celebrities (25 January 2025) – 1 episode
- ITV Racing: Cheltenham Festival Live (13 March 2025, 12 March 2026) – 2 episodes
- I'm a Celebrity: Unpacked (17 April 2026, 20 April 2026) – 2 episodes
- 31st National Television Awards (8 September 2026) – 1 episode
- Prue Leith's Cotswold Kitchen (19 September 2026) – 1 episode
- Big Brother: The Group Chat (12 October 2026) – 1 episode

== Discography ==
=== Singles ===
Single	Year	Peak chart positions	Album
Single	Year	UK	Album
"Last Christmas" (with cast of The Only Way Is Essex series 3)	2011	33	Non-album singles
"Baby, It's Cold Outside" (with Darren Day)	2020	— (Note: "Baby It's Cold Outside" did not enter the UK Singles Chart Top 100, but debuted at number 40 on the UK Singles Downloads Chart and number 43 on the UK Singles Sales Chart.)	Non-album singles
"—" denotes a recording that did not chart or was not released in that territory.

=== Music videos ===
Year	Song	Artist	Ref.
2019	"Sweet Sounds of Summer"	The Tearaways feat. Ron Dante	

== Podcasts ==
- The Gemma Collins Podcast (BBC Sounds, 2019–2021; Acast, 2022–2024)
- The Gemma Collins Love Lounge (BBC Sounds, 2020–2021)

== Bibliography ==
- Basically...: My Life as a Real Essex Girl (2013)
- The GC: How to Be a Diva (2018)

== Awards and nominations ==
=== National Reality Television Awards ===
Year	Category	Work	Result	Ref.
2012	Reality Personality of the Year	The Only Way Is Essex	Nominated	
2015	Reality Personality of the Year	The Only Way Is Essex	Nominated	
2018	Best Female Personality	The Only Way Is Essex	Nominated	
2021	Best Female Personality	Gemma Collins: Diva on Lockdown	Won	
2022	Best Female Personality	Gemma Collins: Self-Harm & Me	Nominated	

=== British Plus Size Awards ===
Year	Category	Work	Result	Ref.
2013	Best Designer	Gemma Collins Collection	Won	
2014	Best Designer	Gemma Collins Collection	Nominated	
2014	Best Celebrity Female	—N/a	Nominated	
2015	Best Celebrity Female	—N/a	Nominated	
2015	Best Online Retailer	Gemma Collins Collection	Nominated	
2015	Best Person in Business	Gemma Collins Collection	Nominated	
2016	Best Person in Business	Gemma Collins Collection	Nominated	

=== Reveal Online Fashion Awards ===
Year	Category	Work	Result	Ref.
2015	Body Confidence	—N/a	Won	

=== National Television Awards ===
Year	Category	Work	Result	Ref.
2022	Authored Documentary	Gemma Collins: Self-Harm & Me	Longlisted	
