= Diva =

Celebrated female singer or actress

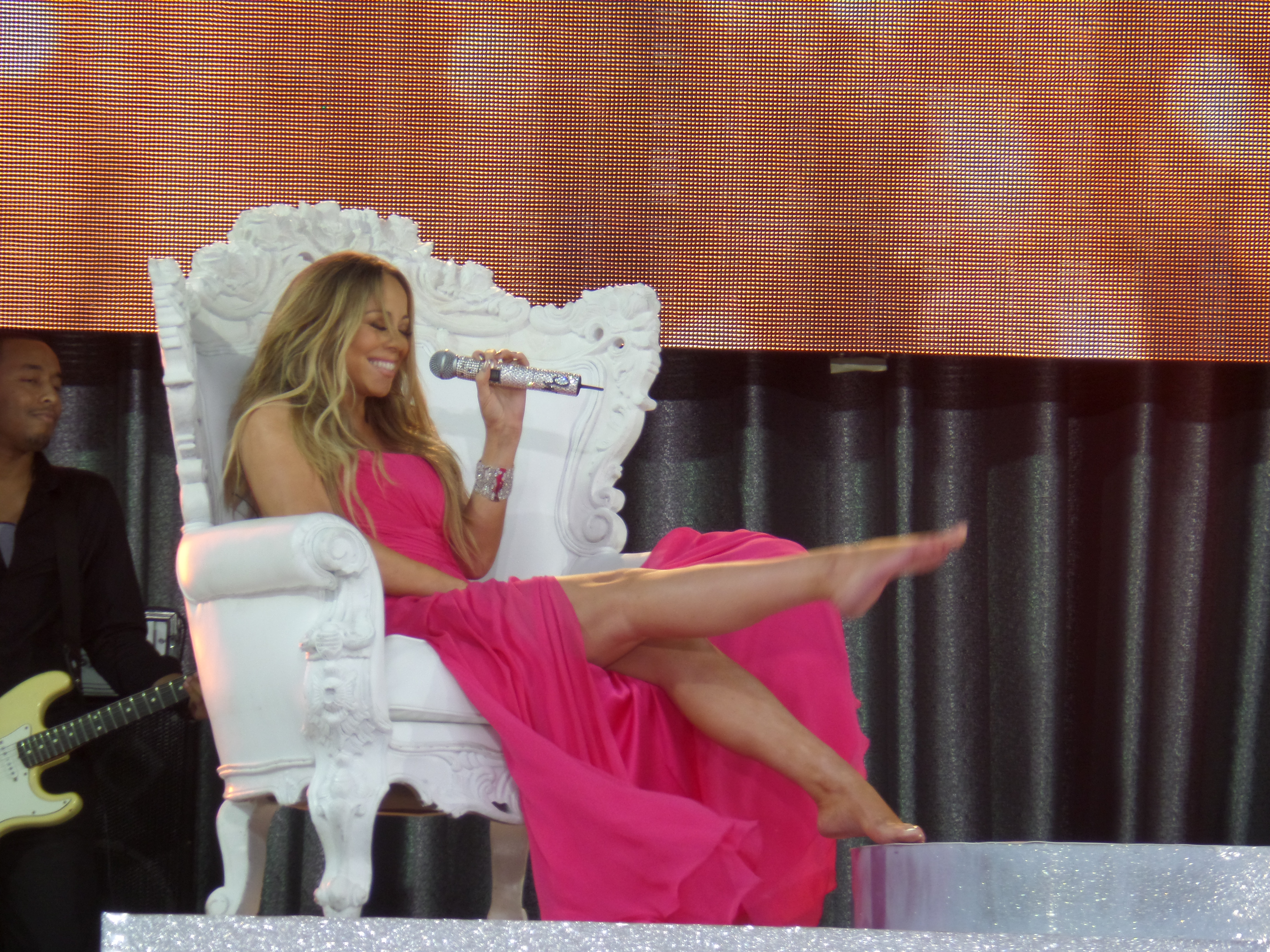
American R&B singer Mariah Carey is often described as an "ultimate diva" by the media for her musical ability as well as her demanding persona.

Diva (/ˈdiːvə/, Italian: [ˈdiːva]), the Latin word for a goddess, used as an honorific to refer to a celebrated woman of outstanding talent in the world of opera, theatre, cinema, fashion and popular music. If referring to an actress, the meaning of diva is closely related to that of prima donna.

Diva can also refer to a person, especially one in performance or show business, with a reputation for being temperamental or demanding. The application of the term has broadened beyond the performing arts to refer to any woman perceived to be difficult and full of drama.

== Derivation and terminology ==
Diva is a name from Roman mythology, and is associated with the nouns divus, diva, which means god, goddess, and the adjective divinius, which means divine or heavenly. The word entered the English language in the late 19th century. It is derived from the Italian noun diva, a female deity. The plural of the word in English is "divas"; in Italian, dive [ˈdiːve]. The basic sense of the term is goddess, the feminine of the Latin word divus (Italian divo), someone deified after death, or Latin deus, a god.

The male form divo exists in Italian and is usually reserved for the most prominent leading tenors, like Enrico Caruso and Beniamino Gigli. The Italian term divismo describes the star-making system in the film industry. In contemporary Italian, diva and divo simply denote much-admired celebrities, especially film actresses and actors, and can be translated as "(film) star". The Italian actress Lyda Borelli is considered the first cinematic diva, following her breakthrough role in Love Everlasting (1913).

An extravagant admiration for divas is a common element of camp culture.

== Modern usage ==
Women are often referred to as divas if they are "difficult, temperamental and demanding". Welsh National Opera note that the title emerged in the early 19th century after an increase of female leading sopranos who "almost became goddess-like in the eyes of their adoring public". They also note that the word has been used by the media to name many female politicians and entertainers rather than "just ambitious and assertive like their male counterparts".

Many pop stars have been labelled as divas in the media, including Aretha Franklin, Ariana Grande, Beyoncé, Cher, Christina Aguilera, Diana Ross, Tina Turner, Sabrina Carpenter, and Whitney Houston. Additionally, Madonna and Mariah Carey have been called an "ultimate diva" in the press and have often embraced the title as their media persona. Carey herself noted on a podcast with Meghan Markle, Duchess of Sussex that today's media "mean you're a successful woman" but also a "bitch" and that "it's not okay for you to be a boss". Musicologist Lily E. Hirsch argues that the phrase may be used in a sexist and racist manner when discussing a woman of color.

Multiple female artists and bands have also released albums and songs either titled or containing the word "diva". These include Annie Lennox, En Vogue, Beyoncé and Sarah Brightman. English media personality and businesswoman Gemma Collins is well known for her "diva persona". In 2018, she released a book titled The GC: How to Be a Diva and began starring in her own reality television series Gemma Collins: Diva.

In 1998, VH1 debuted its first annual VH1 Divas concert with Carey, Franklin, Celine Dion, Gloria Estefan and Shania Twain. Some other artists who performed at later concerts were Whitney Houston, Cher, Tina Turner, Diana Ross and Destiny's Child. From April 1999 to April 2016 WWE used the term "diva" to refer to their female performers. They would retire this term at WrestleMania 32, becoming Women in WWE.

== See also ==
- Queen bee (sociology)

== Bibliography ==
- Doane, Mary Anne (1991). Femmes Fatales: Feminism, Film Theory, Psychoanalysis, Routledge, New York. ISBN 978-0-415-90320-2.
