= In Therapy (British TV series) =

British television reality series

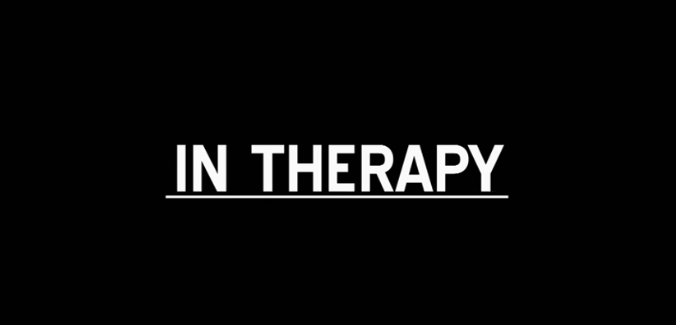
- Also known as: Celebrities in Therapy
- Genre: Reality
- Created by: Channel 5
- Directed by: James Callum; Max Langton
- Presented by: Claudia Bernat (pilot); Mandy Saligari
- Narrated by: Benjamin O'Mahony
- Country of origin: United Kingdom
- Original language: English
- No. of series: 3
- No. of episodes: 17

Production
- Executive producers: Natalie von Hurter; Jonathan Stadlen
- Producers: James Callum; Viki Kolar
- Production locations: London, England
- Editor: Ben Gates
- Running time: 60 minutes

Original release
- Network: Channel 5
- Release: 21 August 2015 – 29 September 2020

In Therapy is a British television reality series broadcast on Channel 5, in which therapist Mandy Saligari talks with various celebrities. The programme ran for three series from 2015 to 2020.

== Episodes ==
Series	Episodes	Originally released	
Series	Episodes	First released	Last released
1	5	21 August 2015	4 January 2017
2	5	18 January 2017	21 August 2017
3	7	29 September 2017	29 September 2020

=== Series 1 (2015–17) ===
Episode number	Original air date	Celebrity	Ratings (millions)
Pilot	21 August 2015	Katie Price	1.33
Episode 1	10 July 2016	Danniella Westbrook	0.96
Episode 2	29 July 2016	Gemma Collins	0.57
Episode 3	3 November 2016	Kerry Katona	0.75
Episode 4	4 January 2017	Coleen Nolan	1.00

=== Series 2 (2017) ===
Episode number	Original air date	Celebrity	Ratings (millions)
Episode 1	18 January 2017	Lauren Goodger	1.04
Episode 2	25 January 2017	Danielle Lloyd	0.89
Episode 3	1 February 2017	Calum Best	1.20
Episode 4	3 August 2017	Nikki Grahame	0.98
Episode 5	21 August 2017	Paul Burrell	0.90

=== Series 3 (2017–20) ===
Episode number	Original air date	Celebrity	Ratings (millions)
Episode 1	29 September 2017	Anthea Turner	0.67
Episode 2	6 October 2017	Bobby Davro	< 0.60
Episode 3	13 October 2017	Claire King	< 0.58
Episode 4	3 January 2018	Marnie Simpson	< 0.63
Episode 5	6 September 2018	Christopher Maloney	< 0.56
Episode 6	22 September 2020	Linda Nolan	TBA
Episode 7	29 September 2020	Saira Khan	TBA
