= Gemma Collins: Diva =

British television franchise

- Genre: Reality television
- Starring: Gemma Collins
- Original language: English

Production
- Executive producer: Kevin O'Brien
- Producer: Sam Rees-Jones
- Running time: 60 minutes (inc adverts)
- Production company: Lime Pictures

Original release
- Network: ITVBe
- Release: 29 August 2018 – 9 December 2020

Gemma Collins: Diva is a British television franchise fronted by television personality and businesswoman Gemma Collins. The franchise began in August 2018, when a one-off special titled Gemma Collins: Diva España was commissioned by ITVBe. Following the successful viewing figures of the special, a full series, Diva Forever, was ordered, and ITVBe has since aired various versions of the series including Diva on Lockdown and Diva for Xmas.

== Series overview ==
Series	Episodes	Originally released	
Series	Episodes	First released	Last released
Diva España	1	29 August 2018	
Diva Forever	5	7 August 2019	4 September 2019
Diva on Lockdown	3	25 April 2020	10 May 2020
Diva Forever & Ever	4	13 October 2020	3 November 2020
Diva for Xmas	1	9 December 2020	

== Diva España ==
Gemma Collins: Diva España is a one-off 90-minute television special that premiered on ITVBe on 29 August 2018. The special centred on Collins' family life, business decisions and her on-off relationship with James Argent, and was narrated by comedian Joel Dommett. The special received 377,183 viewers in 7-day viewing figures. Following the premiere, OK! magazine reported that viewers wanted the special to be developed into a series, stating that one episode was "not enough".

== Diva Forever ==
Gemma Collins: Diva Forever is a British reality television series that was broadcast from 7 August to 4 September 2019 on ITVBe. Filming for Gemma Collins: Diva Forever began in April 2019. The series was filmed across England and the United States, following Collins' business ventures in locations such as her boutique in Brentwood, Essex.

No.	Title	Original release date	UK viewers (millions)
1	"Episode 1"	7 August 2019	0.80
The series is opened with Gemma appearing as a guest presenter on Good Morning Britain, where she announces her record deal with Universal Music. She later goes on a date night with boyfriend James Argent. The next day, she has an argument with James, and contemplates ending their relationship. Gemma then performed "Big Spender" at the Jog On To Cancer charity event in London.
2	"Episode 2"	14 August 2019	0.64
While on the way to her brother's house, Gemma interacts with the paparazzi. She has an off-screen argument with James, and ends their relationship. She stays the night at Dawn Ward's house and gets botox and cheek fillers, which leads her to be over three hours late for a photoshoot. Afterwards, she leaves her leftover meal from the shoot with a homeless person.
3	"Episode 3"	21 August 2019	0.62
Following her breakup with James, Gemma visits a storage unit with her belongings in, and later looks at houses to buy. She then calls her agent and enquires about getting a waxwork figurine at Madame Tussauds. She then attends a meeting with BBC to discuss hosting her own podcast. After taking photos with fans, she meets with Naughty Boy in a music studio. After arriving at Los Angeles, she heads to In-N-Out Burger and treats the crew to a meal.
4	"Episode 4"	28 August 2019	0.68
After arriving in Los Angeles, California, Matt Evers visits Gemma at her hotel. Jonathan Cheban then picks her up in a Rolls-Royce car, and gives her a tour of the city. With Jonathan, she visited Dr. Simon Ourian in his office, and discussed having a fat removal procedure. Afterwards, they walk around the city, and Gemma gets asked for photos and autographs from fans.
5	"Episode 5"	4 September 2019	0.60
Gemma and Jonathan visit a facial specialist, but due to Gemma arriving late, they argue. They later make up over a meal with Matt and Galina Cheban, Jonathan's mother. Gemma then attended a business meeting regarding the launch of a perfume. The next day, she walked the red carpet of the Godzilla: King of the Monsters premiere.

== Diva on Lockdown ==
Gemma Collins: Diva on Lockdown title card

Gemma Collins: Diva on Lockdown premiered on ITVBe on 26 April 2020, and was broadcast until 10 May 2020. Filmed primarily within Collins' home, the series was created as a result of the COVID-19 pandemic since Diva Forever & Ever could not be filmed. Collins took to Instagram and said: "We were in the middle of filming my new series of Diva [Forever] with loads of exciting stuff planned. But as you know, we’ve found ourselves in the middle of a pandemic. So here we are now... I'm standing in my living room, with fixed rig cameras all over my house to bring you Diva on Lockdown." Collins continued: "I'm being filmed and I've also got the producers speaking in my ear so if it sounds as if I’m talking to myself... well maybe sometimes I am. I can guarantee though, what you see will definitely be 100% authentic GC. I hope it cheers you up in these difficult times." Commissioner Paul Mortimer commented: "Gemma has proven in all her previous outings across ITV that she is a star who thrives on audience and public interaction. Both generous and warm, the GC is one of the most gregarious personalities in the UK. ITVBe is therefore very grateful to her for finishing production on her new series whilst on lockdown." Diva on Lockdown was filmed at Collins' home in Brentwood, Essex, with fixed rig cameras set in most rooms. The series was filmed at the beginning of April 2020, and aired across three 60-minute episodes. Kate Amarnani and Huw Slipper act as executive producers for the series, while Sophie Bush produces.

During filming, Diva on Lockdown faced criticism from local residents due to crew members travelling to and from Collins' house. Rebecca Carter of Entertainment Daily reported that "neighbours and locals have raised eyebrows about people traipsing to sit outside Gemma's house to film a reality show when people are dying from this crisis". Representatives of ITV responded: "Safeguarding the well-being of everyone involved in our shows is our priority. Careful new ways have been established to allow new programmes to be created to help keep viewers entertained at this difficult time, whilst following government guidelines. With the appropriate guidance, new measures have been put in place covering production practice for all crew and Gemma." Reviewing the programme, Sarah Carson of i newspaper wrote: "No other factual television is churned out as quickly, yet already this feels like a relic. It is jarring, familiar, revelatory and damning to watch – these stars display the same naivety we shared weeks ago. It’s often said that in future, we’ll look back on reality TV and despair at society. Who could have thought that Gemma Collins would narrate such a landmark moment – or that we’d be looking back quite so soon?", adding that the series "has captured the coronavirus apocalypse better than any documentary".

No.	Title	Original release date	UK viewers (millions)
1	"Episode 1"	26 April 2020	0.78
Gemma visits Lime Pictures to discuss the future of the Diva Forever series. She then attends the Prince's Trust Awards, but is embarrassed when her dress splits while walking the red carpet. Due to the effects of the coronavirus pandemic, she shuts down her clothing boutique, and heads to a bathroom showroom. On the way, she learns that the sale of her new house has fallen through, and breaks into tears in the car. Gemma watches Boris Johnson telling citizens of the UK to stay indoors, and decides that she will continue filming of the series from her brother's home.
2	"Episode 2"	3 May 2020	0.69
Gemma searches herself on YouTube, and is worried when no results appear, so she calls her manager. She then calls mother Joan, and gets upset at not being able to see her. She recites scenes from The Only Way Is Essex with nephew Hayden, and later partakes in Clap for our Carers with her family. On Easter Sunday, she organises an egg hunt for her family.
3	"Episode 3"	10 May 2020	0.53
While fishing with her brother, Gemma reflects on being famous, and says that she wants to make a film. She then sees Tom Moore's fundraising campaign, and donates £1000. Gemma shows the audience her collection of merchandise she has collated throughout her career, and expresses an interest in having a museum dedicated to her in the future. Upon hearing the news that lockdown has been extended for three weeks, Gemma expresses her upset, and states that it is enough to send her "over the edge". The next day, she travels to brother Russell's pub, and the family have a private party. While there, she calls John Barrowman to ask him if he would join her on a national tour.

== Diva Forever & Ever ==
Gemma Collins: Diva Forever & Ever is a reality television series broadcast on ITVBe from 13 October to 3 November 2020. Filming for the series commenced in February 2020, but in March 2020, Collins announced that filming had been paused due to the COVID-19 pandemic. As a result, ITVBe commissioned a spinoff series filmed in Collins' home, Diva on Lockdown. In August 2020, Collins confirmed on her Instagram page that the series had reentered production.

No.	Title	Original release date	UK viewers (millions)
1	"Episode 1"	13 October 2020	0.37
Gemma returns to work at her boutique, where she meets a friend, with whom she discusses her breakup with James, and her miscarriage over lockdown. She then prepares for an online video interview with Loose Women, with her phone stuck to a candle using gaffer tape; her phone falls several times during the interview, and she asks her sister-in-law to hold the phone. Gemma later visits Yorkshire Wildlife Park, where she chooses to adopt a polar bear. She then calls Ant, a bathroom salesman, and arranges a date with him. Afterwards, Gemma meets with Darren Day at a theatre to discuss her upcoming national tour.
2	"Episode 2"	20 October 2020	0.41
Gemma visits a cosmetic surgeon to discuss having a procedure on her breasts. Afterwards, she hires a van to go on a campsite with her brother and nephew. The van attracts attention from campsite residents, and a crowd amasses around them. Gemma refuses to stay there due to feeling overwhelmed, but is persuaded to stay. When she returns home, she invites Ant over to the house to get to know him, and to decide whether she prefers him or long-time friend Laurence. She calls Laurence, and tells him that she would be open to a romantic relationship with him.
3	"Episode 3"	27 October 2020	0.47
Gemma visits a boutique in Chelsea, where her stylist picks out outfits for her upcoming holiday. She flies out to Heraklion, Crete, in order to complete a photoshoot for online retailer InTheStyle. After discussing the benefits and drawbacks of dating Laurence, Gemma calls him and enquires about why he has not reached out since she opened up about her feelings, and asks him to be more proactive about their relationship.
4	"Episode 4"	3 November 2020	0.33
On her final day in Heraklion, Gemma visits a donkey sanctuary. She then returns to England, where she picks out chocolate for a forthcoming Christmas product range. Days later, she prepares for her first date with Laurence, where she encourages him to be open about his feelings for her, which leads to Laurence saying he wants to be with Gemma.

== Diva for Xmas ==
Gemma Collins: Diva for Xmas is the second one-off special in the Diva franchise, following Diva España in 2018. The special involves Collins visiting former The Only Way Is Essex co-star Chloe Sims, visiting a turkey sanctuary, attending a photoshoot for a range of Christmas cards and recording a cover of "Baby, It's Cold Outside" with former Celebrity Big Brother co-star Darren Day. At the end of the special, the music video for Collins' and Day's song was premiered. Filming for the episode occurred in November 2020, and it premiered on ITVBe on 9 December 2020 to 200,552 viewers.
