= Vinted =

Lithuanian online-marketplace company

Vinted Group UAB
- Trade name: Vinted
- Type: Private
- Industry: E-commerce; Recommerce
- Founded: 2008; 18 years ago
- Founders: Justas Janauskas; Milda Mitkutė
- Headquarters: Vilnius, Lithuania
- Area served: Europe (26+ markets)
- Key people: Thomas Plantenga (CEO)
- Products: Second-hand fashion
- Revenue: ▲€1.1 billion (2025)
- Net income: ▲€62 million (2025)
- Number of employees: 2,200+
- Website: www.vinted.com

Vinted Group UAB (formerly Mano Drabužiai, meaning "my clothing") is a Lithuanian technology company best known for its online marketplace Vinted. Vinted is the leading second-hand fashion marketplace in Europe. According to the company, its mission is to 'make second-hand first choice worldwide'.

The company operates the Vinted Marketplace (its peer-to-peer resale platform), Vinted Go (logistics and shipping services), Vinted Pay (in-app payment solutions), and Vinted Ventures (an investment arm supporting the circular economy). Headquartered in Vilnius, Lithuania, it also has offices in Germany and the Netherlands and employs more than 2,200 people.

== History ==
Vinted was co-founded in 2008 by Milda Mitkutė and Justas Janauskas in Vilnius, Lithuania. The idea originated when Mitkute was moving house and wanted a way to sell clothes she no longer needed. Janauskas helped her create a website where users could trade clothing items. In 2016, Dutch entrepreneur Thomas Plantenga joined Vinted as a strategy consultant and later became Chief Executive Officer, leading the company through a period of international growth.

In 2019, Vinted became Lithuania's first technology unicorn after raising €128 million at a €1 billion valuation in a funding round led by Lightspeed Venture Partners. In October 2020, it acquired United Wardrobe, a Dutch competitor, and in November 2020 German Kleiderkreisel and Mamikreisel were merged into the Vinted platform. In 2024, it acquired Trendsales, a Danish resale platform.

According to Vogue Business, Vinted's revenue grew 61% between 2022 and 2023 and the company posted a net profit of €17.8 million in 2023. Usage of Vinted in the UK has grown from 1.2 million users in 2021, to 8 million in 2023. In 2024, the group reported consolidated revenue of €813.4 million (up 36% from 2023) and a net profit of €76.7 million, up 330% from 2023. As of 2024, Vinted was valued at approximately €5 billion, operating in more than 26 markets worldwide and announcing plans to launch in Ireland, Greece, Latvia, Slovenia, and Estonia in 2025. As of 2025, the company employed more than 2,200 people.

In April 2026, Vinted completed a secondary share transaction of €880m, valuing the company at €8bn.

== Products and operations ==
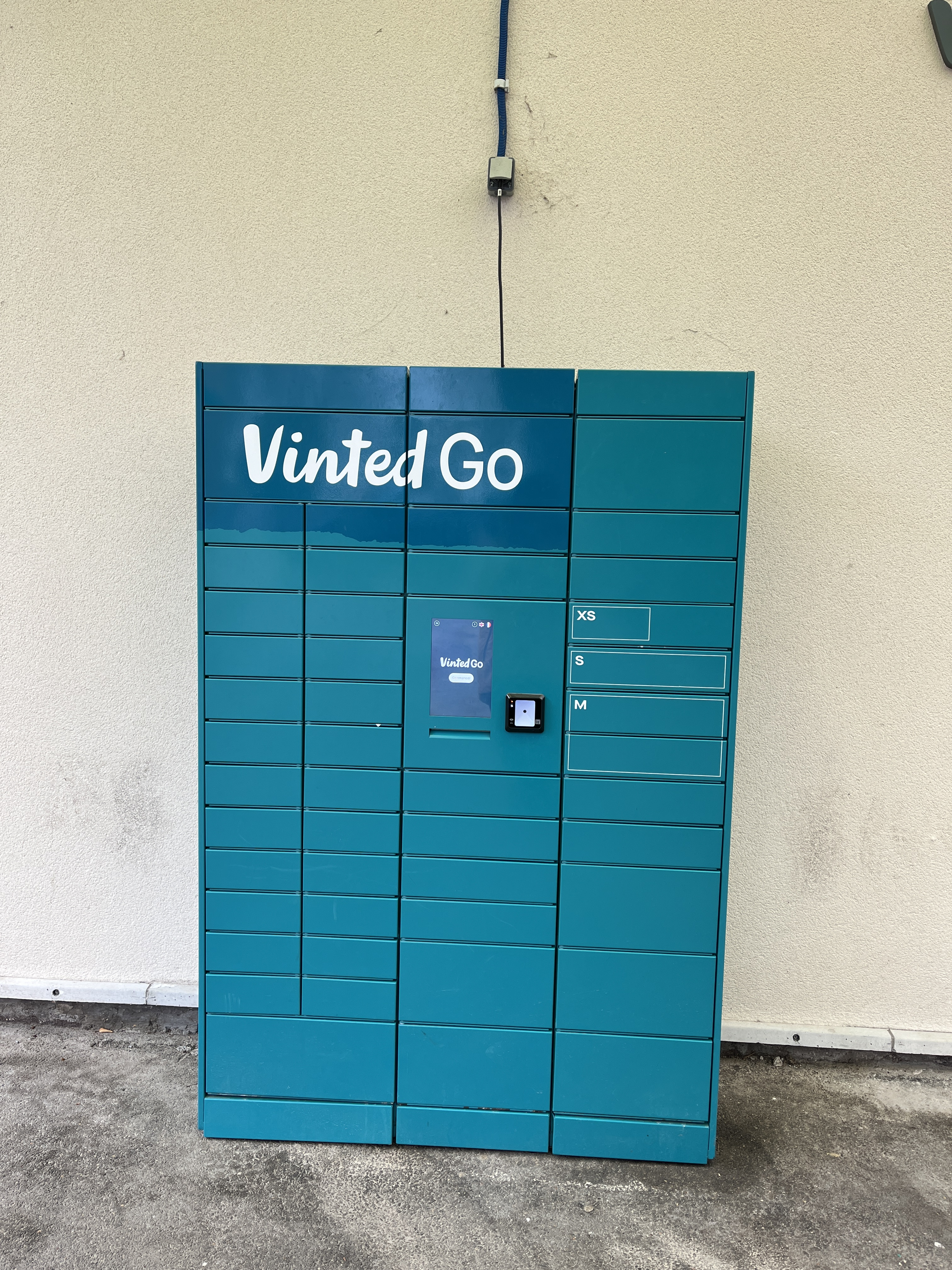
Vinted Go package lockers in Marly-le-Roi, France

Vinted primarily resells clothing but now supports multiple categories including homewares, toys, electronics, books, collectibles, and high-value fashion.

Vinted has worked with figures such as Paul Mescal and Alexa Chung on exclusive wardrobe sales and has also partnered with charities including Oxfam on initiatives which promote the social and environmental value of second-hand fashion, such as the "Style for Change" fashion show at London Fashion Week.

In 2025, Vinted produced a television show, the second-hand fashion competition series RE/Style, hosted by Emma Willis. The show features emerging fashion designers from across Europe creating runway-ready looks from second-hand garments and aired on Prime Video UK.

In 2025, Vinted was reported as France's top clothing retailer by sales volume.

== Criticism and controversies ==
Vinted has faced scrutiny from European data protection authorities in France, Lithuania, and Poland following complaints regarding GDPR compliance and account blocking practices. In July 2024, the Lithuanian authority fined the company €2,375,276. The case was coordinated by a dedicated Vinted Working Group under the European Data Protection Board.

In early 2024, Swedish police reported around 300 fraud cases linked to the platform, in which users' bank accounts were targeted by scammers.

In October 2024, Channel 4 in the United Kingdom aired a documentary examining safety and privacy concerns related to the platform, including the sexualisation of underage users' images and risks associated with second-hand baby products lacking safety certification.

In November 2025, BBC News reported that Vinted's update to its sizing system in the United Kingdom led to widespread user criticism. Vinted said the update was intended to standardise sizing across international brands.

In June 2026, TikTok videos emerged showing Vinted listings of children's toys, such as stuffed animals, accusing the listings of being a front for child trafficking, later nicknaming them "listings for kids". Vinted denied these claims, claiming "there is no credible evidence to support claims that listings on its platform are linked to child trafficking". French police have opened an investigation.
