= The Gemma Collins Podcast =

British podcast series (2019–2024)

- Genre: Comedy; talk; entertainment

Cast and voices
- Hosted by: Gemma Collins

Production
- Production: Wise Buddah Productions (2019–2021); Pineapple Audio Production (2022–2024)
- Length: ~30 minutes

Publication
- No. of episodes: 118
- Original release: 7 August 2019 – 26 February 2024
- Provider: BBC Sounds (2019–2021); BBC Radio 1 (2019–2021); Acast (2022–2024)

Related
- Related shows: The Gemma Collins Love Lounge

The Gemma Collins Podcast is a podcast series hosted by media personality and businesswoman Gemma Collins. It was originally produced for BBC Radio 1 between 2019 and 2021, before moving to Acast from 2022 to 2024. The podcast launched on 14 August 2019 on BBC Sounds with episodes seeing Collins discussing her life, opinions and experiences. It also featured a regular segment where she responded to listeners questions and dilemmas and provided her advice. A spin-off, The Gemma Collins Love Lounge launched in August 2020, with weekly episodes featuring Collins giving love and relationship advice to listeners who wrote in with their queries. Eight series of the podcast aired in total, with an additional four series of Love Lounge. The final episode was broadcast on 26 February 2024.

== Production ==
"Come and get in-depth with the meme queen and listen to my podcast on BBC Sounds!"

— Collins on the launch of The Gemma Collins Podcast on BBC Sounds

In August 2019, the BBC announced the commissioning of The Gemma Collins Podcast for BBC Radio 1 and BBC Sounds. Produced by Wise Buddah Productions and commissioned by executive Louise Kattenhorn, it was described as "an intimate, no-holds barred look inside the life of The GC, with plenty of candid chat, laughs and insider gossip direct from the Essex diva herself." Episodes were scheduled to air weekly on BBC Sounds every Wednesday, with the podcast "allowing fans to hear [Collins] as they've never heard her before." [...] and were invited to "share in the drama and excitement of her day-to-day life", as well as featuring guest appearances from those closest to her, who provide an honest insight into what [Collins'] life is like behind closed doors. The podcast also features Collins taking on the role of an agony aunt, answering listeners’ questions and tackling their life dilemmas each week, with episodes "ending on a high" as Collins shares her "very best nuggets of wisdom with the world." Following the commissioning, Collins said she was "so excited to finally be able to share [her podcast] with the world" and that she had been "absolutely loving working with Radio 1", adding that "If [the listeners] had ever wanted to sit down for a chat with [her]", that's what [the podcast] would be like, describing it as "fun, funny and honest". The podcast was originally commissioned for eight episodes, but was later doubled to sixteen following its success. During the agony aunt segment of the episodes, Collins regularly received emails asking for relationship advice, and thus amid the third series, a spin-off titled The Gemma Collins Love Lounge was commissioned, focusing primarily on Collins reciting her own experiences and offering advice on love, dating and relationships.

In June 2022, it was reported that Collins had decided to end her podcast on BBC Sounds after receiving a higher offer from another provider. This was later confirmed by the BBC, who reportedly "couldn't afford" to match the deal and confirmed in a statement that the podcast had ended on the broadcaster after "six wonderful series", however expressed their gratitude to Collins for her "infectious energy", and for giving the nation a "no-holds barred insight into her life." The final episode on BBC Sounds aired on 15 December 2021. The new broadcaster was later confirmed as Acast, who reportedly offered Collins up to "five-times more" than her BBC salary and granted her more "editorial control". Creator network director Sam Shetabi said: "It's official. We are bringing the GC to Acast. Acast helps podcasters find their valuable audience and make more money, on their own terms, so we can't wait to start working with Gemma on all her creative ideas for the podcast." The podcast was produced by Pineapple Audio Production following its relaunch on 21 October 2022, until the final episode on 26 February 2024.

== BBC Sounds (2019–2021) ==
=== Series 1 (2019) ===
No. overall	No. in series	Title	Original release date
1	1	"Welcome to The Gemma Collins Podcast"	14 August 2019
2	2	"Fake Tan Fails"	14 August 2019
3	3	"Body Confidence and Life Mottos"	21 August 2019
4	4	"A Bad Day"	29 August 2019
5	5	"Is St Tropez and Cannes the same place?"	4 September 2019
6	6	"I'm like GC day care..."	11 September 2019
7	7	"Paps and Trolls"	18 September 2019
8	8	"Be Kind, Guys"	25 September 2019
9	9	"Hard at Work"	2 October 2019
10	10	"I know I'll see an alien...."	9 October 2019
11	11	"Balls of Energy"	16 October 2019
12	12	"Fame!"	23 October 2019
13	13	"I'm being a bit of a diva today..."	30 October 2019
14	14	"WHO INVENTED TIME?"	6 November 2019
15	15	"Are Robots trying to replace Humans?"	13 November 2019
16	16	"Who do I need to call to become the Illuminati?"	20 November 2019
17	17	"What animal was I in a past life?"	27 November 2019
18	18	"Have Yourself a Very GC Xmas, Honey"	4 December 2019
19	19	"The GC's Fave New Podcast: The Reality Tea"	20 December 2019

=== Series 2 (2020) ===
No. overall	No. in series	Title	Original release date
20	1	"Nice smells and peace will resume..."	15 January 2020
21	2	"Is this an accolade to our vaginas?"	22 January 2020
22	3	"It's my birthday and I'll make cake if I want to."	29 January 2020
23	4	"Who is Big Brother?"	5 February 2020
24	5	"I could have washed 10 million towels with all the water in my body"	12 February 2020
25	6	"Gemma versus ghosts"	19 February 2020
26	7	"Get me to Stonehenge ASAP"	26 February 2020
27	8	"I hope I don't have to go through what I saw on I Am Legend"	4 March 2020
28	9	"Gemma Collins - Dream Machine"	11 March 2020
29	10	"There's a lot of people out there that have got pigeon issues"	18 March 2020
30	11	"Love don't cost a thing, J.Lo girl you was right"	25 March 2020
31	12	"Gemma v Self-Isolation"	1 April 2020
32	13	"Relaxing with the GC"	8 April 2020
33	14	"Where do the pigeons think we've gone?"	15 April 2020
34	15	"Some of my arguments with my friends are laughable.."	22 April 2020
35	16	"Please air your nether regions"	29 April 2020

=== Series 3 (2020) ===
No. overall	No. in series	Title	Original release date
36	1	"The GC is back, baby!"	3 June 2020
37	2	"I think it's an Essex thing.."	10 June 2020
38	3	"GC on the afterlife"	17 June 2020
39	4	"Do you remember the first time?"	24 June 2020
40	5	"The G.C. recommends: Have you listened to The Reality Tea?"	24 June 2020
41	6	"Alien Tea Party"	1 July 2020
42	7	"Do you want the good news or the bad news?"	8 July 2020
43	8	"What is money anyway?"	15 July 2020
44	9	"What if the robot says no thanks?"	22 July 2020
45	10	"You might find me in Cornwall this year"	29 July 2020
46	11	"Give the girl some fish!"	5 August 2020
47	12	"Manatees and mermaids"	12 August 2020
48	13	"GC the history teacher"	19 August 2020
49	14	"Gemma's Hollywood dream"	26 August 2020
50	15	"A horse with a disco ball and a baby grand piano..."	2 September 2020
51	16	"Zombie Apocalypse"	9 September 2020
52	17	"Smiling in Milan"	16 September 2020
53	18	"How can we prove aliens are real?"	23 September 2020

=== Series 4 (2020–2021) ===
No. overall	No. in series	Title	Original release date
54	1	"Can a robot rub my feet?"	14 October 2020
55	2	"GC on world peace"	21 October 2020
56	3	"Can we do apple bobbing this year?"	17 October 2020
57	4	"Where does stress come from?"	4 November 2020
58	5	"Some people might never wear a bra again..."	11 November 2020
59	6	"What is that smell...?"	18 November 2020
60	7	"What a week..."	25 November 2020
61	8	"Witchy December"	2 December 2020
62	9	"Aliens making contact"	8 December 2020
63	10	"KISS MY BUTT 2020"	16 December 2020
64	11	"New Year Goals"	6 January 2021
65	12	"Superheroes"	13 January 2021
66	13	"GC for President"	20 January 2021
67	14	"The Big 4-0"	
68	15	"Dream homes vs haunted houses"	3 February 2021
69	16	"Self-love for Valentine's Day."	10 February 2021

=== Series 5 (2021) ===
No. overall	No. in series	Title	Original release date
70	1	"Celebs ask for The GC's help!"	10 March 2021
71	2	"I want a job as a Panda Cuddler"	17 March 2021
72	3	"Through the keyhole of The GC's palace"	24 March 2021
73	4	"Gemma's fabulous fitness secrets"	31 March 2021
74	5	"Mind-blown Gemma"	7 April 2021
75	6	"The names Bond, Gemma Bond"	14 April 2021
76	7	"At home with The GC: a virtual tour"	21 April 2021
77	5	"Unleash the sequins!"	6 May 2021
78	6	"Joe Wicks gives The GC a boost"	12 May 2021
79	7	"The GC's BRITs backstage secrets"	19 May 2021
80	8	"A special message from Gemma"	28 May 2021
81	9	"The GC's Eurovision dreams"	2 June 2021
82	10	"Friend or fake?"	9 June 2021
83	11	"Big-up to the universe!"	16 June 2021
84	12	"Are flamingos pink dinosaurs?"	23 June 2021
85	13	"Costa del Essex"	30 June 2021
86	14	"Summer break"	7 July 2021

=== Series 6 (2021) ===
No. overall	No. in series	Title	Original release date
87	1	"Summer Forever"	25 August 2021
88	2	"Gemma is back - and in love!"	1 September 2021
89	3	"I'm a real-life Cinderella"	8 September 2021
90	4	"Gemma is Queen Bee"	15 September 2021
91	5	"Ask Gemma Anything!"	22 September 2021
92	6	"Gemma X Chelsea Flower Show"	29 September 2021
93	7	"Gemma's Lady Gaga and Bake Off plans"	6 October 2021
94	8	"Gemma reveals her chosen baby name"	13 October 2021
95	9	"Gemma has a surprise offer for Adele"	20 October 2021
96	10	"Gemma's dog dilemma"	27 October 2021
97	11	"It's just got so out of hand..."	3 November 2021
98	12	"Jedward visit The GC palace"	10 November 2021
99	13	"Lady Gaga's kindness expert joins Gemma"	17 November 2021
100	14	"Gemma surprises a fan with an amazing gift!"	24 November 2021
101	15	"Keith Lemon answers Gemma's questions about fairies"	1 December 2021
102	16	"Has Gemma met her match in Kitty Scott-Claus?"	8 December 2021
103	17	"The ultimate GC Christmas celebration"	15 December 2021

== Acast (2022–2024) ==
=== Series 7 (2022) ===
No. overall	No. in series	Title	Original release date
104	1	"The Gemma Collins Podcast Trailer"	21 October 2022
105	2	"Look After The Pennies And They'll Look After You": Cutbacks, Self-care and Cuffing Season"	26 October 2022
106	3	"Please Don't Put Your Bad Breath In My Face": Red Flags, Manifesting and Pumpkins"	1 November 2022
107	4	"I Haven't Got Time To Be Caking And Baking My Face, This Is Me!": Wim Hof, Being The GC and Paranormal Activity"	9 November 2022
108	5	"It's Their Loss, Ghost Them Back!": Intermittent Fasting, Confidence and Ghosting"	16 November 2022
109	6	"Go For It Baby!": Sexual liberation, Winter Solstice and Travel Tips"	23 November 2022
110	7	"Pour The Mulled Wine": Full Moons, Relationship Fixes and Festivities"	30 November 2022
111	8	"When In Poland, Let's Do It!": Christmas Kindness, Naked Spas and Girlbosses"	7 December 2022
112	9	"Remember, It's Good To Talk": Christmas Self-Care, Guardian Angels and"	14 December 2022
113	10	"It's All About Making Memories": Christmas Memories, Plans For 2023 and Success"	21 December 2022

=== Series 8 (2023) ===
No. overall	No. in series	Title	Original release date
114	1	"I Fell In Love With Him All Over Again": Breaking Toilet Seats, Tel Aviv and Resolutions"	11 January 2023
115	2	"A Reason, A Season Or A Lifetime": Friendship, Dry January and Winter Gardening"	18 January 2023
116	3	"Find A Man To Watch Countryfile With!" – Staying Fabulous, Dispelling Fear and Answering Your Questions"	25 January 2023
117	4	"Be In Love With Yourself": Valentine's Day, Self Love and The Perfect Wedding"	31 January 2023

=== Special (2024) ===
No. overall	No. in series	Title	Original release date
118	1	"It's Been A Whirlwind": 12,000 steps round Dubai mall, becoming a dog mother and escaping to the Maldives"	26 February 2024

== Reception ==
"Collins claims she doesn’t know what a podcast is, but that hasn’t stopped her from launching a surprisingly entertaining one"

— Hannah J Davies of The Guardian on The Gemma Collins Podcast

The podcast was described by Hannah J Davies of The Guardian as "rambling, inane and brilliant", adding that the meandering stories about [Collins'] diva antics and close bond with her nephew "could be right out of a Julia Davis imagining." One listener described Collins as "funny and thoughtful" and added that her presence on the podcast was a "ray of sunshine in all this lockdown worrying uncertainty". Whilst another stated that Collins' warmth "transcends through the airways" and said the podcast was "like listening to a good friend chattering away".
