= The Gemma Collins Love Lounge =

British podcast series (2020–2021)

- Genre: Dating; talk; entertainment

Cast and voices
- Hosted by: Gemma Collins

Production
- Production: Wise Buddah Productions
- Length: ~15 minutes

Publication
- No. of episodes: 57
- Original release: 5 August 2020 – 15 December 2021
- Provider: BBC Sounds; BBC Radio 1

Related
- Related shows: The Gemma Collins Podcast

The Gemma Collins Love Lounge is a podcast series hosted by media personality and businesswoman Gemma Collins. It was commissioned as a spin-off of The Gemma Collins Podcast and launched on 5 August 2020 on BBC Sounds with episodes seeing Collins providing her love, dating and relationship advice and recalling her own experiences to listeners who wrote in with their queries. Four series of the spin-off aired and the final episode was broadcast on 15 December 2021.

== Production ==
In August 2019, the BBC announced the commissioning of The Gemma Collins Podcast for BBC Radio 1 and BBC Sounds. During the agony aunt segment of the episodes in which Collins answered her listeners' dilemmas, she regularly received emails asking for relationship advice, and thus amid the third series in August 2020, a spin-off The Gemma Collins Love Lounge was commissioned, focusing primarily on Collins reciting her own experiences and offering advice on love, dating and relationships.

In June 2022, it was reported that Collins had decided to end her podcast on BBC Sounds after receiving a higher offer from another provider. The BBC later confirmed this, who reportedly "couldn't afford" to match the deal and confirmed in a statement that the podcast had ended on the broadcaster. The Gemma Collins Podcast subsequently moved to Acast and relaunched the following year, however the Love Lounge spin-off did not, with the final episode airing on BBC Sounds on 15 December 2021.

== Episodes ==
=== Series 1 (2020) ===
No. overall	No. in series	Title	Original release date
1	1	"Welcome to the Love Lounge"	5 August 2020
2	2	"In-Law Trouble"	12 August 2020
3	3	"Trust Issues"	19 August 2020
4	4	"A case of the "What Ifs""	25 August 2020
5	5	"Ghosting"	25 August 2020
6	6	"Honesty"	2 September 2020
7	7	"The friends' opinions"	9 September 2020
8	8	"Love in the workplace"	23 September 2020

=== Series 2 (2020–2021) ===
No. overall	No. in series	Title	Original release date
9	1	"It's the Love Lounge, baby!"	7 October 2020
10	2	"Cutting out an ex"	14 October 2020
11	3	"In the friend zone"	21 October 2020
12	4	"No more Mr Wrongs"	28 October 2020
13	5	"High Standards"	4 November 2020
14	6	"Lockdown Lovers"	11 November 2020
15	7	"Cheating"	18 November 2020
16	8	"Strange behaviour"	25 November 2020
17	9	"The Spark"	2 December 2020
18	10	"Crushes"	9 December 2020
19	11	"Ready for Love?"	16 December 2020
20	12	"Relationships Vs Personal Expectations"	6 January 2021
21	13	"Awkward Conversations"	13 January 2021
22	14	"Self-esteem in relationships"	20 January 2021
23	15	"Newly Single"	27 January 2021
24	16	"Confused in love"	3 February 2021
25	17	"Stale relationships"	10 February 2021

=== Series 3 (2021) ===
No. overall	No. in series	Title	Original release date
26	1	"Celebrity relationship advice"	10 March 2021
27	2	"Long-distance love"	17 March 2021
28	3	"Should I stay or should I go?"	24 March 2021
29	4	"My boyfriend's flirty friend"	31 March 2021
30	5	"Leaving toxic relationships"	7 April 2021
31	6	"Should I play hard to get?"	14 April 2021
32	6	"He makes me feel stupid"	21 April 2021
33	6	"Bad breath is a no"	5 May 2021
34	7	"Blurred lines"	12 May 2021
35	8	"I'm still a virgin"	19 May 2021
36	9	"The GC's celeb crush revealed"	2 June 2021
37	10	"I don't want to be a secret love!"	9 June 2021
38	11	"Don't give away the candy, honey..."	16 June 2021
39	12	"Call it a day?"	23 June 2021
40	13	"Stuck on my Crush"	30 June 2021
41	11	"The guy's a wrong'un..."	7 July 2021

=== Series 4 (2021) ===
No. overall	No. in series	Title	Original release date
42	1	"Wedding bells for The GC?"	1 September 2021
43	2	"Do I reveal my feelings?"	8 September 2021
44	3	"My bestie's fiancé dislikes me"	15 September 2021
45	4	"Want The GC to tell someone you love them?"	22 September 2021
46	5	"My partner texted another woman"	29 September 2021
47	6	"Gemma reveals her IVF plans"	6 October 2021
48	7	"Why Rami is a keeper"	13 October 2021
49	8	"The GC's top online dating tips"	20 October 2021
50	9	"Let's Be Friends"	27 October 2021
51	10	"Tilly Ramsay and self-love"	3 November 2021
52	11	"The GC and Jedward Love-In!"	10 November 2021
53	12	"Why love is kindness"	17 November 2021
54	13	"Can your friend become 'The One'?"	24 November 2021
55	14	"Don't mix friends with business!"	1 December 2021
56	15	"Romantic Spag Bol"	8 December 2021
57	16	"Gemma's special festive message of love"	15 December 2021
