= List of Celebrity Ex on the Beach cast members =

The following is a list of cast members who have appeared in the MTV reality series Celebrity Ex on the Beach.

== Cast ==
- **Bold** indicates original cast member; all other cast were brought into the series as an ex.

Key: = "Cast member" returns to the beach for the second time.
Key: = "Cast member" returns to the beach for the third time.

Name	Series	Age	Exes	Ref.
**Ashley McKenzie**	1	30	Danielle Kedward	
**Calum Best**	1	38	Ayesha Reid, Marissa Jade, Megan Rapley, Victoria Winterford	
**Georgia Harrison**	1	24	Miles Nazaire	
**Joey Essex**	1	29	Ellie Brown	
**Lateysha Grace**	1	26	—N/a	
**Lorena Medina**	1	27	Itay Ohayon, Patrick Hale	
**Marissa Jade**	1	34	Calum Best	
**Michael Griffiths**	1	27	—N/a	
Ellie Brown	1	21	Charlie Brake, Joey Essex	
David McIntosh	1	34	Tiffany Pollard	
Victoria Winterford	1	26	Calum Best, Lotan Carter	
Itay Ohayon	1	26	Lorena Medina	
Danielle Kedward	1	29	Ashley McKenzie	
Charlie Brake	1	24	Ellie Brown	
Sophie Kasaei	1	30	—N/a	
Tiffany Pollard	1	38	David McIntosh	
Lotan Carter	1	30	Victoria Winterford	
Patrick Hale	1	20	Lorena Medina	
Ayesha Reid	1	26	Calum Best	
Megan Rapley	1	23	Calum Best	
Miles Nazaire	1	24	Georgia Harrison	
Metisha Schaefer	1	35	David McIntosh	
Ashley Tyler	1	30	Georgia Harrison	
**A'Whora**	2	25	—N/a	
**James Lock**	2	35	Anya Carter	
**Kaz Crossley**	2	26	Theo Campbell	
**KC Osborne**	2	33	Michael Goonan	
**Kori Sampson**	2	25	Faye Mill	
**Megan Barton-Hanson**	2	27	—N/a	
**Michael Boateng**	2	26	Lisa Steele	
**Nathan Henry**	2	30	Declan Doyle, Tommy Baljet	
**Sofie Karlstad**	2	24	—N/a	
Theo Campbell	2	30	Kaz Crossley, Lexi Taylor	
Tommy Baljet	2	34	Nathan Henry	
Ella Rae Wise	2	21	Kris Boyson	
Michael Goonan	2	30	KC Osborne	
Kris Boyson	2	33	Ella Rae Wise	
Declan Doyle	2	31	Nathan Henry	
Lisa Steele	2	30	Michael Boateng	
Anya Carter	2	25	James Lock	
Faye Mill	2	25	Kori Sampson	
Lexi Taylor	2	31	Theo Campbell	
Rudi Hewitt	2	26	Anya Carter	
Emelle Smith	2	33	Megan Barton-Hanson	
Gemma Pell	2	28	Theo Campbell, James Lock	
**Ashley Resch**	3	27	Zay Wilson	
**Chloe Veitch**	3	24	Joel Motton, Callum Izzard, Meile Bishop	
**Finley Tapp**	3	23	Paige Turley	
**Ivorian Doll**	3	25	—N/a	
**James Pendergrass**	3	24	Parker Abbott	
**Jarred Evans**	3	31	—N/a	
**Joe Garratt**	3	27	—N/a	
**Tamara Joy**	3	34	Jake Ellis, Craig Shipley	
**Yazmin "Yaz" Oukhellou**	3	29	James "Lockie" Lock	
Jake Ellis	3	37	Tamara Joy	
Paige Turley	3	26	Finley Tapp	
Chloe Brockett	3	22	—N/a	
Parker Abbott	3	23	James Pendergrass	
Joel Motton	3	30	Chloe Veitch	
Craig Shipley	3	32	Tamara Joy	
James "Lockie" Lock	3	36	Yazmin Oukhellou	
Jessika Power	3	31	—N/a	
Callum Izzard	3	28	Chloe Veitch	
Zay Wilson	3	28	Ashley Resch	
Meile Bishop	3	28	Chloe Veitch	

- Ages at the time the cast member appeared in the series
