= Kaz Crossley =

English television personality (born 1995)

- Born: Kazimir Samita Crossley; 20 January 1995 (age 31); London, England
- Occupation: Television personality
- Years active: 2018–present
- Known for: Love Island; The Challenge UK; The Challenge: World Championship; Love Island: All Stars

Kazimir Samita Crossley (born 20 January 1995) is an English television personality. In 2018, she appeared as a contestant on the fourth series of the ITV2 dating show Love Island. She subsequently went on to appear on Celebrity Ex on the Beach in 2022, and went on to win both The Challenge UK and The Challenge: World Championship in 2023. In 2025, she appeared on the second series of Love Island: All Stars.

== Life and career ==
Kazimir Samita Crossley was born on 20 January 1995 in London, England. She is of Thai descent. Prior to appearing on television, she worked as a make-up artist. In 2018, she became a contestant on the fourth series of the ITV2 reality dating show Love Island. She entered the villa as a on Day 26, as part of the programme's "Casa Amor" twist. She subsequently coupled up with Josh Denzel, and the pair reached the final where they finished in third place. Crossley and Denzel entered a relationship, however announced their split in January 2019. In 2022, Crossley appeared on the second series of Celebrity Ex on the Beach.

In February 2023, Crossley was detained in the United Arab Emirates, after a leaked video showed her snorting a white substance in Dubai several years prior. Crossley spent several nights in a jail cell and said the video, that had been taken in secret and leaked had "completely destroyed my mental health". Crossley subsequently appeared on The Challenge UK, going on to the win the series and subsequently earned a place in The Challenge: World Championship, featuring winners of The Challenge franchises around the world, which Crossley also went on to win. In 2025, it was announced that Crossley would return to Love Island to appear as a contestant on the second series of Love Island: All Stars.

== Filmography ==
As herself
Year	Title	Notes	Ref.
2018	Love Island	Contestant; series 4	
2022	Celebrity Ex on the Beach	Participant; series 2	
2023	The Challenge UK	Contestant; winner	
2023	The Challenge: World Championship	Contestant; winner	
2023	The Challenge: Battle for a New Champion	Guest appearance; episode 6	
2025	Love Island: All Stars	Contestant; series 2	
