= Ella Rae Wise =

English television personality (born 2000)

- Born: Ella Rae Wise; 12 July 2000 (age 26); Havering, London, England
- Occupation: Television personality
- Television: The Only Way Is Essex; Celebrity Ex on the Beach; The Challenge UK; Celebrity Big Brother; Love Island (2015 TV series)

Ella Rae Wise (born 12 July 2000) is an English television personality, known for appearing as cast member on the ITVBe reality series The Only Way Is Essex since 2019. She has also appeared on Celebrity Ex on the Beach, The Challenge UK and Celebrity Big Brother.

== Life and career ==
Ella Rae Wise born on 12 July 2000 in Havering, London, where she attended Frances Bardsley Academy for Girls. In 2019, she joined the ITVBe reality series The Only Way Is Essex, and has appeared as a cast member since the show's twenty-fourth series. Wise said she was scouted to appear on the programme via Instagram. During her time on the show, she has dated several of her co-stars including Pete Wicks and Dan Edgar respectively. In 2022, Wise appeared on the second series of Celebrity Ex on the Beach. In 2023, Wise was a contestant on The Challenge UK. She was eliminated in episode 4. In April 2025, Wise entered the Celebrity Big Brother house to appear as a housemate on the twenty-fourth series. As of August 2026 she is in a relationship with Ricky Lawrence.

== Filmography ==
As herself
Year	Title	Role	Ref.
2019–present	The Only Way Is Essex	Regular role	
2022	Celebrity Ex on the Beach	Cast member; series 2	
2023	The Challenge UK	Contestant; series 1	
2025	Celebrity Big Brother	Housemate; series 24	
