= The Challenge: Battle for a New Champion =

39th season of the reality television series

Battle for a New Champion
- Season 39
- Presented by: T. J. Lavin
- No. of contestants: 24
- Winner: Emanuel Neagu
- Location: Pula, Croatia
- No. of episodes: 21 (including the two-part Reunion special)

Release
- Original network: MTV
- Original release: October 25, 2023 – March 6, 2024

Season chronology
- ← Previous; Ride or Dies Next → 40: Battle of the Eras

The Challenge: Battle for a New Champion is the 39th season of the MTV reality competition series The Challenge, featuring alumni from The Challenge, Are You the One? (U.S.), Big Brother (UK and U.S.), Ex on the Beach (UK and U.S.), Survivor (Romania, Turkey and U.S.), Love Island (U.S.), So You Think You Can Dance, The Mole Germany, Exatlón Estados Unidos, Ibiza Weekender, The Bachelor & The Bachelorette (Australia), 12 Dates of Christmas, The Circle (U.S.), The Only Way Is Essex, Shipwrecked, and The Royal World competing for a share at up to a $500,000 prize.

The season premiered on October 25, 2023 with a simulcast on MTV2, preceded by a launch special titled "Countdown Begins" which aired on October 18, 2023.

== Format ==
Battle for a New Champion features 24 contestants who have previously competed on The Challenge (including spin-offs) but have not won a season. The season's prize pot starts at $300,000, however, money can be added to or removed from the pot based on the outcomes of certain challenges and eliminations. The season has three formats (or "phases") called Control, Chaos, and Conquest.

- Control (episodes 1-4): Players all compete together as one group to complete a challenge; if they are successful, $50,000 is added to the prize pot. Afterward, the contestants vote for one player (of either gender for the first three episodes and male for the fourth episode due to uneven numbers) to compete in the elimination round (the "Arena"). The player who receives the most votes then calls out any player of the same gender as their opponent for the Arena. The winner remains in the game while the loser is eliminated.
- Chaos (episodes 5-14): Players compete in challenges as pairs or teams. The winners are immune and earn the power to nominate one player of the designated gender to potentially compete in the Arena. The house, besides the winners, then vote to nominate a second player of the same gender to potentially compete in the Arena. At the Arena, a former champion of The Challenge enters to compete against one of the nominated contestants, or a contestant of their choice, depending on the outcome of the Draw they partake in. If the selected contestant defeats the Champion, they remain in the competition, however, they are eliminated if they lose.
- Conquest (episodes 15-17): Players compete in challenges and eliminations individually. The winner of each daily challenge is immune while the last-place player (of either gender) is eliminated. The nominations are determined by a chain of safety where the challenge winner selects another contestant (regardless of gender) to save from elimination; the saved contestant then selects the next contestant to save, with this process continuing until three contestants are not saved. The three contestants who are not saved compete in a private elimination round. The winner(s) remain in the competition while the losers are eliminated.

After all three phases, the final seven contestants compete in the Final Challenge to determine the champion of the season.

Twists

- Champions: During the "Chaos" format, ten previous champions of The Challenge appear to compete against contestants in a one-off elimination round. If the champions win their elimination, they are awarded $10,000 from the season's prize pot.
  - The Draw: Each entering Champion partakes in the Draw by randomly choosing between three covered poles to determine their opponent for the elimination round: one pole with the name of each nominated player and a third "Chaos" pole which allows them to choose any non-immune contestant as their opponent.
- Purge Challenges: During the "Conquest" format, players who finish last in each challenge were immediately eliminated from the game.
- Double Elimination: Episode 16 and 17's Conquest Elimination were double eliminations where only one contestant remained in the game while the two losing contestants were eliminated.

== Contestants ==
Male contestants	Original season	Finish
Emanuel Neagu	Survivor România 1	Winner
Corey Lay	12 Dates of Christmas 1	Fourth place
Jay Starrett	Survivor: Millennials vs. Gen X	Seventh place
James Lock	The Only Way Is Essex 24	Episode 17
Horacio Gutiérrez	Exatlón Estados Unidos 5	Episode 16
Kyland Young	Big Brother 23	Episode 16
Ed Eason	The Circle US 1	Episode 16
Asaf Goren	So You Think You Can Dance 12	Episode 14
Callum Izzard	Ibiza Weekender 7	Episode 7
Ciarran Stott	The Bachelorette Australia 5	Episode 5
Hughie Maughan	Big Brother UK 17	Episode 4
Chauncey Palmer	The Challenge: Ride or Dies	Episode 2

Female contestants	Original season	Finish
Nurys Mateo	Are You the One? 6	Runner-up
Colleen Schneider	The Mole Germany	Third place
Berna Canbeldek	Survivor Turkey 8	Fifth place
Moriah Jadea	The Challenge: Ride or Dies	Sixth place
Olivia Kaiser	Love Island USA 3	Episode 17
Michele Fitzgerald	Survivor: Kaôh Rōng	Episode 17
Zara Zoffany	The Royal World	Episode 15
Ravyn Rochelle	The Challenge: Ride or Dies	Episode 15
Melissa Reeves	Ex on the Beach UK 2	Episode 9
Tula "Big T" Fazakerley	Shipwrecked: Battle of the Islands	Episode 8
Sofia "Jujuy" Jiménez	Dancing with the Stars Argentina 2018	Episode 3
Jessica Brody	The Bachelor Australia 7	Episode 1

=== Champions ===
Although not in contention to win the season, ten champions of The Challenge appeared during the season to compete in elimination rounds against contestants and win a cash prize.

Champions	Original season	Appearance
Jordan Wiseley (Note: Battle of the Exes II) (Note: XXX: Dirty 30) (Note: War of the Worlds 2) (Note: The Challenge: World Championship)	The Real World: Portland	Episode 5
Kaz Crossley (Note: The Challenge UK)	Love Island UK 4	Episode 6
Devin Walker-Molaghan (Note: Ride or Dies)	Are You the One? 3	Episode 7
Kaycee Clark (Note: Spies, Lies & Allies)	Big Brother 20	Episode 8
Tori Deal	Are You the One? 4	Episode 9
Darrell Taylor (Note: The Gauntlet) (Note: The Inferno) (Note: The Inferno II) (Note: Fresh Meat)	Road Rules: Campus Crawl	Episode 10
Laurel Stucky (Note: Free Agents)	The Challenge: Fresh Meat II	Episode 11
Cara Maria Sorbello (Note: Battle of the Bloodlines) (Note: Vendettas)	The Challenge: Fresh Meat II	Episode 12
Brad Fiorenza (Note: Cutthroat)	The Real World: San Diego (2004)	Episode 13
Chris "CT" Tamburello (Note: Rivals II) (Note: Invasion of the Champions) (Note: Double Agents)	The Real World: Paris	Episode 14

Champion of

== Gameplay ==
The contestants are first brought to the Arena where they must figure out that they must team up to complete a series of puzzles in order to unlock cots, food, and alcohol for an overnight stay in the Arena.

=== Challenge games ===
- Hole Control: The group must enter a deep mud pit, scale a wall to get out with 24 large poles and arrange them to depict a Challenge logo within 10 minutes. If they are successful, $50,000 is added to the prize pot.
  - Result: Failed
- Ball Control: The group has 23 minutes to collect 23 balls in the water, with the names of each remaining contestant on them, and drop them into a chute at the top of a tall platform. To reach the chute, they must climb and clip their life jackets to hanging ropes to form two human ladders. Additionally, each ball can only be placed in the chute by the player assigned to it. Each deposited ball is worth $2,000, and a bonus $4,000 awarded if all 23 balls are in the chute at the end of the challenge.
  - Result: Failed ($6,000 earned)
- Control Tower: Sixteen group members divide themselves among eight numbered buggies, each with one driver and one passenger. The remaining six group members must solve a math equation, then, from a control tower, direct the buggy drivers to their correct positions to replicate the equation. To fully replicate the equation, the passengers must also arrange large plus and minus signs into their correct position. The group then repeat this process, attempting to solve and replicate as many of the four equations as possible within 30 minutes. For each equation solved and replicated within 30 minutes, $10,000 is added to the pot, and a bonus $10,000 is awarded if all four equations are completed.
  - Result: Passed ($50,000 earned)
- Under Control: The group must swim to 25 buoys in the water, collect puzzle pieces submerged below, and use them to solve five puzzles located on floating pontoons. Each contestant must collect at least one puzzle piece, or wait for help from someone who has collected their first piece, before they can help solve the puzzles. They must then swim each completed puzzle to a final platform. For each puzzle brought to the platform within 15 minutes, $5,000 is added to the pot, and a bonus $25,000 is awarded if all five puzzles are at the final platform.
  - Result: Passed ($50,000 earned)
- Upside Down Whirled: Played in male-female teams of two. Teams begin strapped to a propeller which is mounted to the side of a truck. As the truck speeds down a runway, thereby spinning the propeller, team members attempt to collect rings at the top of the truck and land them on targets and poles along the runway. Landing a ring on a target is worth 5 points while landing one on a pole is worth 10 points. The team with the most points wins.
  - Winners: Corey & Ravyn
- Bingo Bango: Played in two teams of six and one team of seven. Each team begins with a five-by-five bingo board. One at a time, host T.J. Lavin drops numbered balls into a mud pit and one member of the assigned gender from each team enters the mud pit attempting to collect the balls and slot them in their board. The first team to line up five balls either vertically, horizontally or diagonally wins.
  - Winners: Berna, Colleen, Emanuel, Horacio, Kyland and Zara
- Working the Angles: Played in five teams of three and one team of four. Teams begin on a large pyramid suspended over water which has a puzzle key on one of the faces. They must work together to recreate the key using puzzle pieces at a second pyramid, swinging on a rope to get there. The team with the fastest time wins.
  - Winners: Big T, Horacio and Kyland
- Tower of Power: Played in two teams of nine. Each team has a tower surrounded by two gates, and have 30 minutes to use provided items to barricade the gates as much as they can. After the 30 minutes are up, teams switch positions and attempt to break into their opponent's tower. The first team to break into their opponent's tower and lower the flag at the top wins.
  - Winners: Berna, Corey, Emanuel, James, Jay, Moriah, Nurys, Ravyn and Zara
- Doom Sticks: Played in male-female pairs and one team of three, teams compete in up to three events. For the first two events, the last place team is eliminated from the challenge while the winners must then eliminate another two teams. Afterwards, the team that wins the third event wins the challenge.
  - Event 1 (Speed Sticks): Teams begin with five sticks which they must transfer to a rack at the other end of a field, one at a time. After depositing each stick, teams can bring another team's stick back to the start to slow them down.
  - Event 2 (Power Sticks): Teams must pull a sled between two ends of a field, loading one heavy stick onto the sled each time they reach an end, continuing until they collect five sticks and cross the finish line.
  - Event 3 (Pick Up Sticks): Teams must use a pole to hook and transfer seven three-dimensional puzzle pieces to the end of a field, one at a time, before using them to solve a puzzle.
  - Winners: Asaf, Ravyn and Zara
- Sky Ball: Played in two teams of eight. Four team members begin inside a suspended sphere filled with 130 balls, while the remaining four members remain on the ground. The team members on the ground solve a puzzle to reveal a code which the team members in the sphere use to unlock two small openings before dropping all the balls through the openings. The team members on the ground must then collect the dropped balls and place them in their team's pyramid structure. The first team to place all 130 balls in their pyramid wins.
  - Winners: Asaf, Colleen, Emanuel, Horacio, Jay, Moriah, Ravyn and Zara
- Banquet of Champions: Played in four teams of four. Teams must transfer three numbered boxes from a field to their team's table to form a code which unlocks four dishes: brain soup, skin and colon stew, boar snout and ear, and a "spicy surprise" drink. Before picking up a box, teams answer a trivia question; if they answer correctly, they can take the lighter box, however, if they answer incorrectly, they must carry a heavier box instead. Afterwards, the first team to consume their four dishes wins.
  - Winners: Colleen, Corey, James and Moriah
- We All Fall Down: Played in four teams of four in a tournament format where the two teams that win their first matchup compete against each other in a final round. For each matchup, two teams begin on a platform above water with a hanging wall between them, and attempt to push the wall into their opponents to make them fall into the water. The team that pushes all members of the opposing team into the water wins the matchup. The team that wins the final round wins the challenge.
  - Winners: Berna, Ed, Horacio and Zara
- Getting Tanked: Played in four teams of four. Three team members enter a water tank on the back of a tank truck, which is filled with dozens of floating letter tiles, while the fourth team member remains on top of the tank. As the truck swerves down a runway, the team members in the tank must search for letter tiles needed to spell the phrase "Challenge Champion" and hand them to the team member on top of the trailer, who slots the letters into a board to form the phrase. The team with the fastest time wins.
  - Winners: Berna, Corey, Ed and Olivia
- Off in the Distance: Played in four teams of four. Teams carry a pole and race down a trail to three checkpoints, and complete each checkpoint to obtain bags of puzzle pieces. After completing a checkpoint, teams must bring the puzzle pieces back to the starting point (using the pole) before continuing to the next checkpoint. The first team to complete all three checkpoints, collect all their puzzle pieces and solve the puzzle wins.
  - Checkpoint 1: Each team member must swing a rope against an overhead saw to cut the rope and release a bag of puzzle pieces.
  - Checkpoint 2: Each team member must maneuver one bag of puzzle pieces to the end of a rope to release it.
  - Checkpoint 3: Teams must count the number of squares in an image and multiply the total by 39 to form the combination required to unlock their bags of puzzle pieces.
  - Winners: James, Kyland, Michele and Moriah
- Dark Tide: Five players at a time begin strapped to a speeding boat and are dropped into the water once the boat reaches a certain point. Players must swim to a paddleboard and paddle to collect three floating rings and return them to shore. Once onshore, players must then throw one of their rings around a pole from behind a line. The player with the fastest time wins while the player with the slowest time is eliminated.
  - Winner: Ed
  - Eliminated: Ravyn
- End of the Line: Played in five heats, players begin on a platform above water and harnessed to a rope. They must descend down the rope and use the stopping device on their harness to stop as close to the bottom of the rope as possible. Players are disqualified from the challenge if they fall into the water after failing to stop in time. The player who stops closest to the end of the rope in the fastest time wins and also receives $15,000 worth of Under Armour aparrel. If multiple players are disqualified, the last-place player, who is eliminated, is determined by who fell into the water the slowest.
  - Winner: Jay
  - Eliminated: Ed
- Drum Roll: Players begin on a rolling drum above water, holding onto a rope, and attempt to stay on the drum as long as possible. The last five players standing then compete in a winner's round while the first five players to fall into the water compete in a loser's round. The last player standing in the winner's round wins the challenge while the first player to fall into the water in the loser's round is eliminated.
  - Winner: Berna
  - Eliminated: Michele

=== Arena games ===
- Fall Out: Players begin in suspended in a glass-based cube. They must remove tiles from the cube before pulling a rope to retrieve a hammer and using it to smash through the glass floor. The first player to finish wins.
  - Played by: Big T vs. Jessica
- Might Light: Each round, players collect illuminated cylinders from the boundary of the Arena and place them into slots of a wall in the center, attempting to line up as many rows of three as possible. The player with the most rows of three at the end of the three rounds wins.
  - Played by: Chauncey vs. James
- Dirty Deeds: Each round, players search through a pile of dirt containing three items, and attempt to bring them into their basket at the boundary of a circle. Physical contact is allowed within the circle to steal items, however items cannot be stolen once deposited. The first player to deposit two of the three items into their basket wins the round. The first player to win two rounds wins.
  - Played by: Jujuy vs. Ravyn
- How I Roll: Each player has a rotatable track and nine balls. They must align the track with nine baskets, and roll the balls down the track to have them land in each basket. The first player to land all nine balls wins.
  - Played by: Hughie vs. Kyland
- King of the Hills: Played in three rounds. In the Arena are two ramps, each with three lights on top. One at a time, a random light illuminates and the first player to press the button at that light wins a point. The player with the most points after one minute wins the round. The first player to win two rounds wins.
  - Played by: Ciarran vs. Jordan
- Loaded Barrel: Players begin inside a barrel and must roll themselves to collect five bags of puzzle pieces around the Arena before using them to solve a puzzle. The first player to solve the puzzle wins.
  - Played by: Big T vs. Kaz
- Totally Mental: Players must place ten crates of miscellaneous items in a line, then count the contents of each crate and arrange the crates in numerical order based on the counts. The first player to correctly order all ten crates wins.
  - Played by: Callum vs. Devin
- Pole in the Storm: Players begin in the center of the Arena with both hands on a pole. The first player to wrestle the pole out of their opponent's hands two out of three times wins.
  - Played by: Big T vs. Kaycee
- Going Under: Players must collect puzzle pieces submerged in a water tank and arrange them to match an answer key, which can only be accessed by pulling a rope to lower the board into the tank. The first player to finish wins.
  - Played by: Melissa vs. Tori
- Fire Walker: Players begin suspended on a hexagonal platform which has one fire bowl branching from each corner. They must rotate and maneuver the platform using their bodyweight to ignite each bowl at nearby flamethrower. The first player to light all six bowls wins.
  - Played by: Darrell vs. Kyland
- Chain Reaction: Players must pull a multicolored chain through a pyramid to retrieve a code at the end and use it to unlock a box of 100 colored pegs. They must then arrange the pegs on a board to recreate the ten color sequences on the chain they pulled. The first player to finish wins.
  - Played by: Laurel vs. Ravyn
- Block Head: Players must transfer nine large cubic puzzle pieces from the boundary of the Arena to their platform in the center and use the pieces to solve a puzzle. The first player to solve the puzzle wins.
  - Played by: Cara Maria vs. Michele
- What's Going Down: Each player begins at the top of a five-level tower with ten numbered balls at the bottom. They must slide out the planks that make up the floor of each level out so they can descend to the bottom of the tower, collect all ten balls and place them in a chute at the top in numerical order. The first player to finish wins.
  - Played by: Brad vs. Kyland
- Mind Grind: Players must push a 250-pound (110 kg) wheel around a circle and into a hole at the end to raise an incomplete math equation. They must then search a box of number tiles for the missing numbers and place them in their correct positions to solve the equation. The first player to finish wins.
  - Played by: Asaf vs. CT
- Conquest Elimination (Episode 15): Players race to complete three stations, in any order, to obtain a flag for each station and return them to the start. The first two players to complete all three stations win.
  - Station 1: Players must cross a balance beam then form six three-letter words on a word ring puzzle.
  - Station 2: Players must crawl under a net before solving a puzzle which requires them to rearrange stacks of colored discs so that each stack is the same color.
  - Station 3: Players must scale a wall before solving a Sudoku puzzle.
  - Played by: Horacio vs. Kyland vs. Zara
- Conquest Elimination (Episode 16): Players race to complete three stations, in any order, to obtain a flag for each station and return them to the start. The first player to complete all three stations wins.
  - Station 1: Players must climb over a wall then use geometric puzzle pieces to recreate a given image.
  - Station 2: Players must cross a balance beam then pair together chains so that the links in each pair add up to 39.
  - Station 3: Players must crawl under a net, use blocks to build three equal stacks on one end of a seesaw-like apparatus, then pull a rope to balance out the apparatus without toppling their stacks.
  - Played by: Horacio vs. Kyland vs. Nurys
- Conquest Elimination (Episode 17): Players race to complete three stations, in any order, to obtain a flag for each station and return them to the start. The first player to complete all three stations wins.
  - Station 1: Players must cross a balance beam then turn on or off a series of switches to replicate a display shown through a small hole.
  - Station 2: Players must scale a wall then solve a slide puzzle.
  - Station 3: Players must crawl under a net, enter a barrel of ice and search for 15 number tiles. After finding all 15 tiles, they must place them under the names of the 15 eliminated contestants from the season to match the order they were eliminated.
  - Played by: James vs. Nurys vs. Olivia

=== Final Challenge ===
The final seven contestants compete in the Final Challenge which has three phases – Control, Chaos and Conquest – mirroring the phases of the season.

Day one

For the Control phase, players work as a group to complete a challenge. If they are successful, the prize pot remains at the $356,000 accumulated so far; if not, the pot is reduced by $16,000. Afterwards, contestants vote for one player (regardless of gender) to compete in an elimination. The player who receives the most votes then calls out any player as their opponent.

- Control Challenge: Each group member must consume a drink made of tuna, beetroot, and mayonnaise. Then, with a time-limit of 60 minutes, the group are tethered together and race to a fortress where they must search for 19 chests containing colored ropes. After finding three ropes of the same color, or the nine matching ropes in a special golden chest, one player disconnects from the group and returns those ropes to the start. Once all players return to the start with their ropes, the group must connect the ropes to poles to form a symbol.
  - Result: Failed (prize pot reduced to $340,000)
- Control Elimination: Players must collect three bags of blocks before stacking the blocks on an unsteady table which must be balanced using their leg. The first player to finish wins while the loser is eliminated from the Final Challenge.
  - Played by: Corey vs. Jay
  - Eliminated: Jay (7th place)

For the Chaos Phase, players compete in a challenge where winner earns the power to select one contestant to compete in an elimination. The selected contestant then participates in the Draw by selecting between six covered poles to determine their opponent. Four of the poles contain the names of the non-immune finalists while two poles allow the selected player to choose any player as their opponent.

- Chaos Challenge: Players compete, in teams of two which alternate for each checkpoint, in five checkpoints along a trail. For the last four checkpoints, teams time out if they are unable to complete the checkpoint after an extended time. The player with the fastest overall time for all five checkpoints wins.
  - Checkpoint #1: Teams must untangle a rope wrapped in a spherical cage, bring the rope past a line then roll the cage past the line.
  - Checkpoint #2: Teams paddle a kayak around a buoy and return to shore before using geometric puzzle pieces to recreate a given image.
  - Checkpoint #3: Teams must answer a trivia question, swing a hanging chest with the correct answer on it against an overhead saw to release it, and transport the chest to a designated point. Teams then repeat this process for a second chest. If teams answer incorrectly and saw an incorrect chest, they must take that chest, which is heavier, to the designated point instead.
  - Checkpoint #4: Each team member must consume three jalapeño shots, a lamb brain and eyeball soup, and a "stomach lining surprise" dish.
  - Checkpoint #5: Each team member must consume a drink made of tuna, beetroot, and mayonnaise. Teams must then unravel and release two hanging bags of balls from an overhead structure. Afterwards, each team member must hold up one side of a bumpy track, align the track, and roll a ball down the track to have it land in a box at the end.
  - Winner: Emanuel
- Chaos Elimination: Players solve a puzzle which requires them to fit six blocks inside a square box. In an aspect unaired in the episode, players could also run to collect a clue for the puzzle at the risk of losing time. The first player to solve the puzzle wins while the loser is eliminated from the Final Challenge.
  - Played by: Moriah vs. Nurys
  - Eliminated: Moriah (6th place)
- Overnight Stage: Players must remove all dozens of tiles from a box behind a mesh screen with small holes. The first three players to finish can select, in the order they finish, an item to spend the night with - a blanket, a pillow or a chair. Additionally, the first two players to finish can each add more tiles to another finalist's box. Afterwards, players must spend the night awake on a beach.

Day two

For the Conquest Phase, players complete the Conquest Challenge which consists of three checkpoints. The first player to finish all three checkpoints and cross the finish line is declared the winner of Battle for a New Champion and receives $250,000 from the prize pot; second place receives $60,000; third place receives $30,000.

- Conquest Challenge: Players swim two kilometres (1.2 mi) to an island where they race to complete three checkpoints before crossing the finish line.
  - Checkpoint #1: Players race to the top of a 700-foot cliff before consuming a drink made of tuna, beetroot, and mayonnaise to have their time stopped. Afterwards, players must rappel down the side of the cliff (in the order they finished the drink) and solve a tangram puzzle at the bottom (or time out after 15 minutes) before proceeding to the next checkpoint.
  - Checkpoint #2: Players must consume a drink made of tuna, beetroot, and mayonnaise. Afterwards, they must dive under a cage to view an answer key with the names of former champions of The Challenge, and recreate the answer key onshore.
  - Checkpoint #3: Players race to complete five stations, in any order, to obtain a flag for each station and return them to the start. After completing all five stations, players proceed to the finish line.
    - Station 1: Players must climb over two barriers then solve a puzzle which requires them to rearrange colored discs so that each stack is the same color.
    - Station 2: Players must cross a balance beam and solve a Sudoku puzzle.
    - Station 3: Players must climb over three cubes then use a sledgehammer to flatten a barrel so that it fits in a shallow box.
    - Station 4: Players must maneuver through a cage covered with ropes. Afterwards, they must use blocks to build three equal stacks on one end of a seesaw-like apparatus, then pull a rope to balance out the apparatus for 10 seconds without toppling their stacks.
    - Station 5: Players must scale a wall, count the number of circles and dots in an image, then use the numbers to solve an equation.

Final results

- Winner: Emanuel ($250,000)
- Runner-up: Nurys ($60,000)
- Third place: Colleen ($30,000)
- Fourth place: Corey
- Fifth place: Berna

== Game summary ==
Control Phase
Episode		Gender	Challenge type	Result	Arena contestants				Arena game	Arena outcome		Prize Pot
#	Challenge	Gender	Challenge type	Result	Voted in	Called out	N/A		Arena game	Winner	Eliminated	Prize Pot
1	Hole Control	N/A	Collective	Failed	Jessica	Big T	N/A		Fall Out	Big T	Jessica	$300,000
2	Ball Control	N/A	Collective	Failed	Chauncey	James	N/A		Might Light	James	Chauncey	$306,000
3	Control Tower	N/A	Collective	Passed	Ravyn	Jujuy	N/A		Dirty Deeds	Ravyn	Jujuy	$356,000
4	Under Control	Male	Collective	Passed	Hughie	Kyland	N/A		How I Roll	Kyland	Hughie	$406,000
Chaos Phase
#	Challenge	Gender	Challenge type	Winners	Winners' pick	Voted in	Champion	Called out	Arena game	Winner	Loser	Prize Pot
5	Upside Down Whirled	Male	Male/Female pairs	Corey & Ravyn	Asaf	**Ciarran**	Jordan	N/A	King of the Hills	Jordan	Ciarran	$396,000
6	Bingo Bango	Female	2 teams of 6 & 1 team of 7	Red Team	Melissa	**Big T**	Kaz	N/A	Loaded Barrel	Big T	Kaz	$396,000
7	Working the Angles	Male	5 teams of 3 & 1 team of 4	Team 5	Emanuel	Corey	Devin	**Callum**	Totally Mental	Devin	Callum	$386,000
8	Tower of Power	Female	2 teams of 9	Orange Team	Melissa	**Big T**	Kaycee	N/A	Pole in the Storm	Kaycee	Big T	$376,000
9	Doom Sticks	Female	Male/Female pairs & 1 team of 3	Asaf, Ravyn & Zara	**Melissa**	Colleen	Tori	N/A	Going Under	Tori	Melissa	$366,000
10	Sky Ball	Male	2 teams of 8	Orange Team	**Kyland**	James	Darrell	N/A	Fire Walker	Kyland	Darrell	$366,000
11	Banquet of Champions	Female	4 teams of 4	Team 1	**Ravyn**	Zara	Laurel	N/A	Chain Reaction	Ravyn	Laurel	$366,000
12	We All Fall Down	Female	4 teams of 4	Team 4	Colleen	Ravyn	Cara Maria	**Michele**	Block Head	Michele	Cara Maria	$366,000
13	Getting Tanked	Male	4 teams of 4	Team 4	Horacio	**Kyland**	Brad	N/A	What's Going Down	Kyland	Brad	$366,000
14	Off in the Distance	Male	4 teams of 4	Orange Team	Horacio	—N/a (Note: The episode 14 house vote was tied between Ed and Emanuel. After a revote, the vote continued to stalemate. As a result, the Champion, CT, did not have to partake in The Draw and was automatically given the "Chaos" choice to select any non-immune contestant as his opponent for the elimination round.)	CT	**Asaf**	Mind Grind	CT	Asaf	$356,000
Conquest Phase and Final Challenge
#	Challenge	N/A	Challenge type	Winner	Not saved			Elimination game		Winner(s)	Eliminated	Prize Pot
15	Dark Tide	N/A	Individual	Ed	—N/a						Ravyn	$356,000
15	Dark Tide	N/A	Individual	Ed	Horacio	Kyland	Zara	Conquest Elimination		Horacio	Zara	$356,000
15	Dark Tide	N/A	Individual	Ed	Horacio	Kyland	Zara	Conquest Elimination		Kyland	Zara	$356,000
16	End of the Line	N/A	Individual	Jay	—N/a						Ed	$356,000
16	End of the Line	N/A	Individual	Jay	Horacio	Kyland	Nurys	Conquest Elimination		Nurys	Horacio	$356,000
16	End of the Line	N/A	Individual	Jay	Horacio	Kyland	Nurys	Conquest Elimination		Nurys	Kyland	$356,000
17	Drum Roll	N/A	Individual	Berna	—N/a						Michele	$356,000
17	Drum Roll	N/A	Individual	Berna	James	Nurys	Olivia	Conquest Elimination		Nurys	James	$356,000
17	Drum Roll	N/A	Individual	Berna	James	Nurys	Olivia	Conquest Elimination		Nurys	Olivia	$356,000
18/19	Final Challenge	N/A	Collective → Pairs → Individual	**Emanuel**	2nd: Nurys; 3rd: Colleen; 4th: Corey; 5th: Berna; 6th: Moriah; 7th: Jay							$340,000

Bold indicates the contestant was selected in the Draw to compete against a champion in the Arena.

=== Episode progress ===
Contestants	Episodes																	
Contestants	Control				Chaos										Conquest			Finale
Contestants	1	2	3	4	5	6	7	8	9	10	11	12	13	14	15	16	17	Finale
Emanuel	SAFE	SAFE	SAFE	SAFE	SAFE	WIN	NOM	WIN	SAFE	WIN	SAFE	SAFE	SAFE	SAFE	SAFE	SAFE	SAFE	WINNER
Nurys	SAFE	SAFE	SAFE	SAFE	SAFE	SAFE	SAFE	WIN	SAFE	SAFE	SAFE	SAFE	SAFE	SAFE	SAFE	ELIM	ELIM	SECOND
Colleen	SAFE	SAFE	SAFE	SAFE	SAFE	WIN	SAFE	SAFE	NOM	WIN	WIN	NOM	SAFE	SAFE	SAFE	SAFE	SAFE	THIRD
Corey	SAFE	SAFE	SAFE	SAFE	WIN	SAFE	NOM	WIN	SAFE	SAFE	WIN	SAFE	WIN	SAFE	SAFE	SAFE	SAFE	FOURTH
Berna	SAFE	SAFE	SAFE	SAFE	SAFE	WIN	SAFE	WIN	SAFE	SAFE	SAFE	WIN	WIN	SAFE	SAFE	SAFE	WIN	FIFTH
Moriah	SAFE	SAFE	SAFE	SAFE	SAFE	SAFE	SAFE	WIN	SAFE	WIN	WIN	SAFE	SAFE	WIN	SAFE	SAFE	SAFE	SIXTH
Jay	SAFE	SAFE	SAFE	SAFE	SAFE	SAFE	SAFE	WIN	SAFE	WIN	SAFE	SAFE	SAFE	SAFE	SAFE	WIN	SAFE	SEVENTH
James	SAFE	ELIM	SAFE	SAFE	SAFE	SAFE	SAFE	WIN	SAFE	NOM	WIN	SAFE	SAFE	WIN	SAFE	SAFE	OUT	
Olivia	SAFE	SAFE	SAFE	SAFE	SAFE	SAFE	SAFE	SAFE	SAFE	SAFE	SAFE	SAFE	WIN	SAFE	SAFE	SAFE	OUT	
Michele	SAFE	SAFE	SAFE	SAFE	SAFE	SAFE	SAFE	SAFE	SAFE	SAFE	SAFE	ELIM	SAFE	WIN	SAFE	SAFE	LAST	
Horacio	SAFE	SAFE	SAFE	SAFE	SAFE	WIN	WIN	SAFE	SAFE	WIN	SAFE	WIN	NOM	NOM	ELIM	OUT		
Kyland	SAFE	SAFE	SAFE	ELIM	SAFE	WIN	WIN	SAFE	SAFE	ELIM	SAFE	SAFE	ELIM	WIN	ELIM	OUT		
Ed	SAFE	SAFE	SAFE	SAFE	SAFE	SAFE	SAFE	SAFE	SAFE	SAFE	SAFE	WIN	WIN	SAFE	WIN	LAST		
Zara	SAFE	SAFE	SAFE	SAFE	SAFE	WIN	SAFE	WIN	WIN	WIN	NOM	WIN	SAFE	SAFE	OUT			
Ravyn	SAFE	SAFE	ELIM	SAFE	WIN	SAFE	SAFE	WIN	WIN	WIN	ELIM	NOM	SAFE	SAFE	LAST			
Asaf	SAFE	SAFE	SAFE	SAFE	NOM	SAFE	SAFE	SAFE	WIN	WIN	SAFE	SAFE	SAFE	OUT				
Melissa	SAFE	SAFE	SAFE	SAFE	SAFE	NOM	SAFE	NOM	OUT									
Big T	ELIM	SAFE	SAFE	SAFE	SAFE	ELIM	WIN	OUT										
Callum	SAFE	SAFE	SAFE	SAFE	SAFE	SAFE	OUT											
Ciarran	SAFE	SAFE	SAFE	SAFE	OUT													
Hughie	SAFE	SAFE	SAFE	OUT														
Jujuy	SAFE	SAFE	OUT															
Chauncey	SAFE	OUT																
Jessica	OUT																	

Color key:

The contestant completed the Final Challenge and won
The contestant completed the Final Challenge and lost
The contestant was eliminated during the Final Challenge
The contestant won the daily challenge and was immune from elimination
The contestant was nominated for the Arena and saved by not being chosen to compete
The contestant was not selected for the Arena
The contestant won the elimination in the Arena
The contestant lost in the Arena and was eliminated
The contestant placed last in the daily challenge and was eliminated

=== Team progress ===
Episodes 5-14: Chaos Phase
Each challenge is played in pairs or in teams, which are randomly selected or determined based on where contestants are standing.
Episodes 18-19: Final Challenge
Throughout the Chaos portion of the Final Challenge, players were required to play with a teammate throughout the five checkpoints. Teams were selected randomly.

Contestants	Episode																		
Contestants	5	6	7	8	9		10	11	12	13	14	15	16	17	Finale				
Emanuel	Berna	Red	Team 2	Orange	Berna		Orange	Team 2	Team 3	Team 1	Turquoise	Individual; Game			Colleen	Berna	Moriah	Nurys	Corey
Nurys	James	Blue	Team 4	Orange	Horacio		Blue	Team 4	Team 3	Team 3	Yellow	Individual; Game			Corey	Moriah	Colleen	Emanuel	Berna
Colleen	Callum	Red	Team 1	Blue	Ed		Orange	Team 1	Team 1	Team 2	Yellow	Individual; Game			Emanuel	Corey	Nurys	Berna	Moriah
Corey	Ravyn	Turquoise	Team 6	Orange	Olivia		Blue	Team 1	Team 3	Team 4	Turquoise	Individual; Game			Nurys	Colleen	Berna	Moriah	Emanuel
Berna	Emanuel	Red	Team 6	Orange	Emanuel		Blue	Team 2	Team 4	Team 4	Turquoise	Individual; Game			Moriah	Emanuel	Corey	Colleen	Nurys
Moriah	Kyland	Turquoise	Team 4	Orange	Jay		Orange	Team 1	Team 2	Team 1	Orange	Individual; Game			Berna	Nurys	Emanuel	Corey	Colleen
Jay	Melissa	Turquoise	Team 1	Orange	Moriah		Orange	Team 3	Team 1	Team 3	Yellow	Individual; Game							
James	Nurys	Turquoise	Team 2	Orange	Melissa		Blue	Team 1	Team 2	Team 3	Orange	Individual; Game							
Olivia	Ed	Turquoise	Team 1	Blue	Corey		Blue	Team 3	Team 3	Team 4	Blue	Individual; Game							
Michele	Asaf	Blue	Team 3	Blue	Kyland		Blue	Team 4	Team 2	Team 2	Orange	Individual; Game							
Horacio	Big T	Red	Team 5	Blue	Nurys		Orange	Team 2	Team 4	Team 2	Blue	Individual; Game							
Kyland	Moriah	Red	Team 5	Blue	Michele		Blue	Team 4	Team 2	Team 1	Orange	Individual; Game							
Ed	Olivia	Blue	Team 4	Blue	Colleen		Blue	Team 4	Team 4	Team 4	Yellow	Individual; Game							
Zara	Ciarran	Red	Team 3	Orange	Asaf	Ravyn	Orange	Team 2	Team 4	Team 1	Blue	Individual; Game							
Ravyn	Corey	Blue	Team 6	Orange	Asaf	Zara	Orange	Team 3	Team 1	Team 3	Turquoise	Individual; Game							
Asaf	Michele	Blue	Team 4	Blue	Ravyn	Zara	Orange	Team 3	Team 1	Team 2	Blue								
Melissa	Jay	Turquoise	Team 2	Blue	James														
Big T	Horacio	Turquoise	Team 5	Blue															
Callum	Colleen	Blue	Team 3																
Ciarran	Zara																		

== Voting progress ==
Winners' pick	—N/a				Asaf; 2 of 2 votes	Melissa; 5 of 6 votes	Emanuel; 3 of 3 votes	Melissa; 9 of 9 votes	Melissa; 3 of 3 votes	Kyland; 7 of 8 votes	Ravyn; 3 of 4 votes	Colleen; 3 of 4 votes	Horacio; 3 of 4 votes	Horacio; 3 of 4 votes		—N/a	Nurys; 1 of 1 vote
House vote	Jessica; 23 of 24 votes	Chauncey; 18 of 23 votes	Ravyn; 12 of 22 votes	Hughie; 15 of 21 votes	Ciarran; 10 of 18 votes	Big T 12 of 13 votes	Corey; 16 of 16 votes	Big T 9 of 9 votes	Colleen; 6 of 14 votes	James; 6 of 8 votes	Zara; 12 of 12 votes	Ravyn; 11 of 12 votes	Kyland; 7 of 12 votes	Stalemate		Corey; 5 of 7 votes	—N/a
Champion	—N/a				Jordan	Kaz	Devin	Kaycee	Tori	Darrell	Laurel	Cara Maria	Brad	CT		—N/a	
Called out	Big T Jessica's choice	James; Chauncey's choice	Jujuy; Ravyn's choice	Kyland; Hughie's choice	—N/a		Callum; Devin's choice	—N/a				Michele; Cara Maria's choice	—N/a	Asaf; CT's choice		Jay; Corey's choice	—N/a
Draw pick	—N/a				Ciarran	Big T	—N/a	Big T	Melissa	Kyland	Ravyn	—N/a	Kyland	—N/a			Moriah
Voter	Episodes																
Voter	1	2	3	4	5	6	7	8	9	10	11	12	13	14		Finale	
Emanuel	Jessica		Ravyn	Hughie		Melissa	Corey	Melissa	Moriah	Kyland	Zara	Ravyn	Kyland	Ed	Ed	Nurys	Nurys
Nurys	Jessica		Jay	Hughie	Ciarran	Big T	Corey	Melissa	Berna	James	Zara	Ravyn	Emanuel	Emanuel	Emanuel	Corey	
Colleen	Jessica	Chauncey	Emanuel	Hughie	Ciarran	Melissa	Corey	Big T		Kyland	Ravyn	Ravyn	Kyland	Ed	Ed	Nurys	
Corey	Jessica	Chauncey	Ravyn	Asaf	Asaf	Big T	Corey	Melissa	Colleen	James	Ravyn	Ravyn	Horacio	Ed	Corey	Corey	
Berna	Jessica	Chauncey	Asaf	Hughie	Ciarran	Melissa	Corey	Melissa	Colleen	James	Zara	Ravyn	Horacio	Ed	Ed	Corey	
Moriah	Jessica	Chauncey	James	Hughie	Emanuel	Big T	Corey	Melissa		Kyland	Berna	Ravyn	Kyland	Horacio		Corey	
Jay	Jessica	Chauncey	Ravyn	Hughie	Ciarran	Big T	Corey	Melissa	Colleen	Kyland	Zara	Ravyn	Kyland	Ed	Ed	Corey	
James	Jessica	Ciarran	Ravyn	Callum		Big T	Corey	Melissa	Colleen	Ed	Ravyn	Ravyn	Kyland	Horacio			
Olivia	Jessica	Chauncey	Ed	Hughie	Ciarran	Big T	Corey	Big T		James	Zara	Ravyn		Emanuel	Emanuel		
Michele	Jessica	Chauncey	Callum	Hughie		Big T	Corey	Big T	Colleen	James	Zara	Ravyn	Kyland	Horacio			
Horacio	Big T	Chauncey	Ravyn	Hughie	Ciarran	Melissa	Emanuel	Big T	Colleen		Zara	Colleen	Jay	Emanuel	Emanuel		
Kyland	Jessica	Hughie	Ravyn	Hughie	Ciarran	Ravyn	Emanuel	Big T		Ed	Zara	Moriah	Jay				
Ed	Jessica	Chauncey	Ravyn	Hughie	Ciarran	Big T	Corey	Big T		James	Zara	Colleen	Horacio	Emanuel	Jay		
Zara	Jessica	Chauncey	Ciarran	Corey	Emanuel	Melissa	Corey	Melissa	Melissa	Kyland	Zara	Colleen	Jay	Emanuel	Emanuel		
Ravyn	Jessica	Hughie	Ravyn	Hughie	Asaf	Big T	Corey	Melissa	Melissa	Kyland	Zara	Ravyn	Jay	Emanuel	Emanuel		
Asaf	Jessica		Ravyn	Hughie	Ciarran	Big T	Corey	Big T	Melissa	Kyland	Zara	Ravyn	Kyland	Ed	Ed		
Melissa	Jessica		Kyland	Emanuel	Emanuel	Big T	Corey	Big T									
Big T	Jessica		Corey	Horacio	Emanuel	Ravyn	Emanuel	Big T									
Callum	Jessica	Chauncey	Ravyn	Hughie		Big T	Corey										
Ciarran	Jessica	James	Ravyn	Hughie	Ciarran												
Hughie	Jessica		Ravyn	Kyland													
Jujuy	Jessica		Horacio														
Chauncey	Jessica	Chauncey															
Jessica	Jessica																

=== Selection progress ===
Episode	15	16	17
Challenge winner	Ed	Jay	Berna
1	Emanuel	Michele	Corey
2	Berna	Olivia	Colleen
3	Colleen	Moriah	Emanuel
4	Corey	James	Jay
5	Michele	Emanuel	Moriah
6	Jay	Berna	
7	Moriah	Colleen	
8	James	Corey	
9	Nurys		
10	Olivia		
Elimination nominees	Horacio; Kyland; Zara	Horacio; Kyland; Nurys	James; Nurys; Olivia

== Episodes ==
No. overall	No. in season	Title	Original release date	US viewers (millions)
527	1	"Teamwork Makes The Perfect Work"	October 25, 2023	0.34 (Note: MTV2 simulcast ratings not included.)
528	2	"Two Lungs, One Heart, Can't Lose"	November 1, 2023	0.31
529	3	"It's a Matter of Semantics"	November 8, 2023	0.29
530	4	"I'm Coming Out"	November 8, 2023	0.19
531	5	"Countdown to Chaos"	November 15, 2023	0.39
532	6	"The Big Mistake"	November 22, 2023	0.38
533	7	"So Flip Floppy"	November 29, 2023	0.41
534	8	"Struggling to Hold It Together"	December 6, 2023	0.42
535	9	"A Banana Split"	December 13, 2023	0.39
536	10	"Feeling Used"	December 20, 2023	0.36
537	11	"My Own Worst Frenemy"	December 27, 2023	0.45
538	12	"A Legend Returns"	January 3, 2024	0.50
539	13	"El Saboteur"	January 10, 2024	0.53
540	14	"Don't Let TJ Decide"	January 17, 2024	0.49
541	15	"Welcome to Conquest"	January 24, 2024	0.48
542	16	"Family Knows Best"	January 31, 2024	0.48
543	17	"Feel the Bern"	February 7, 2024	0.46
544	18	"The Beginning of the End"	February 14, 2024	0.52
545	19	"Only One Gets the Crown"	February 21, 2024	0.51

=== Reunion special ===
The two-part reunion special aired on February 28 and March 6, 2024 and was hosted by entertainment personality Maria Menounos. Cast members attended in Amsterdam, Netherlands.

== Reception ==
The season received a nomination for GLAAD Media Award in the "Outstanding Reality Competition Program" category at the 35th GLAAD Media Awards.
