= The Challenge Argentina: El Desafío =

Argentine Reality TV show

- Genre: Reality competition
- Created by: Mary-Ellis Bunim; Jonathan Murray
- Based on: The Challenge
- Presented by: Marley
- Country of origin: Argentina
- Original language: Spanish
- No. of seasons: 1
- No. of episodes: 15 (including special)

Production
- Production locations: Buenos Aires & Pilar, Argentina
- Production company: Boxfish TV

Original release
- Network: Telefe
- Release: 13 February – 7 March 2023

Related
- The Challenge: World Championship

The Challenge Argentina: El Desafío (lit. 'The Challenge Argentina: The Challenge') is an Argentine spin-off of the American reality competition series The Challenge, featuring Argentinian reality television contestants and celebrities competing against one another in various challenges to avoid elimination.

The series, hosted by TV presenter Marley, premiered on Telefe on February 13, 2023.

== Background ==
In February 2022, a new series of international seasons of The Challenge was announced to air later in the year. The series comprises four new editions of The Challenge, which includes The Challenge: USA, The Challenge: Australia, The Challenge Argentina: El Desafío and The Challenge UK. These local renditions were followed by a fifth series in which winners and select contestants of each series will compete again on another season titled The Challenge: World Championship, which aired on Paramount+.

In addition to the opportunity to represent the Argentine series in The Challenge: World Championship, cast members also competed to win an ARG$15,000,000 prize pool. Unlike other spin-off versions, there was only one winner.

== Format ==
Argentina: El Desafío consists of a daily challenge, winner's selection and an elimination round. For the first ten episodes, players compete in male-female pairs which change for each cycle of the game.

- Daily Challenge: Players compete in the main challenge in male/female teams of two. The last-place team is automatically sent to the elimination round. The winners earn the power to select a second team to compete in the elimination against the last-place team.
- Eliminations ("The Arena"): The last-place team from the daily challenge compete in an elimination round against the team selected by the winners of the daily challenge. The winners remain in the game while the losers are eliminated.

For episode 11/12, the game changed to an individual format. Players compete in daily challenges individually, where the last-place players of the each gender are automatically sent to Arena to compete individually against a same-gender recently eliminated opponent (see twists below) later selected by the winners.

Twists

- The Algorithm: From episodes 1 to 10, an algorithm assigns players a new partner of the opposite gender for each cycle of the game. Players must be assigned a new partner they haven't previously been paired with, and cannot have the same partner twice in a row if they have already partnered with each eligible remaining player. The Algorithm also selected pairs during the Final Challenge.
- Re-entry Twist: Rather than selecting between contestants still in the game, the winners of the "Te Cayó la Ficha" challenge had to select one eliminated player of each gender (from the six most-recently eliminated contestants) to return and compete in the Arena against the last-place players of the challenge. The winners continue in the game while the losers are eliminated.

== Contestants ==
Male contestants	Known for	Finish
Oky Appo	YouTuber	Runner-up
Yeyo de Gregorio	Actor	Third place
Rodrigo "Rodri" Cascón	Celebrity chef	Fourth place
Lio Ferro	Influencer	Seventh place
Adrián "Adro" Cormillot (Note: In a twist, the winners of the "Te Cayó la Ficha" challenge - Eva & Rodri - had to select one eliminated player of each gender to return and compete in the Arena against the last-place players, instead of choosing between players still in the game. They selected Adro and Fernanda.)	Celebrity physician	Episode 12
Benjamín "Benja" Alfonso	Actor	Episode 8
Rodrigo "Morita" Mora	Former football player	Episode 6
Lizardo Ponce	Influencer	Episode 4
Fernando Burlando	Celebrity lawyer	Episode 2

Female contestants	Known for	Finish
Sol Pérez	Model and presenter	Winner
Eva Bargiela	Model	Fifth place
Claudia Albertario	Model and actress	Sixth place
Julieta "Juli" de la Puente	Influencer	Eighth place
María Fernanda Callejón	Actress	Episode 12
Virginia "Virgie" Elizalde	Former model	Episode 10
Sofia "Jujuy" Jiménez	Model	Episode 6
Florencia "Floppy" Tesouro	Model and vedette	Episode 4
Carolina Duer	Professional boxer	Episode 2

=== Future appearances ===
Albertario, Jiménez, Alfonso and Cascón competed on The Challenge: World Championship.

Jiménez competed on The Challenge: Battle for a New Champion.

== Gameplay ==
=== Challenge games ===
- El Patrón Letal: Teams race 800 metres down a path to a pattern covered by blinds. There, one team member must balance one-footed on a narrow pole to open the blinds and reveal the pattern for their partner to memorise. After the team member balancing falls off, teams must return to their board at the start and attempt to replicate their pattern, repeating this process until they correctly recreate the entire pattern. The first team to finish wins while the last team to finish is automatically sent to the Arena.
  - Winners: Juli & Oky
- Remo y Corona: Played in two heats. Team members alternate turns paddling a surfboard to collect four crown pieces floating in a lake, then use them to assemble a crown. The team with the fastest time wins while the team with the slowest time is automatically sent to the Arena.
  - Winners: Juli & Rodri
- Respuesta Boleadora: Teams must solve three numerical questions, search a mud pit for six balls to form the answers and clip them onto strings to form three bolas. Teams must then throw their bolas into their post from behind a line. The first team to land all three bolas wins while the last team to finish is automatically sent to the Arena.
  - Winners: Rodri & Virgie
- Habemus Barril: Teams must transfer four 50-kilogram barrels across a field, stacking them to reach and set off flares atop three stations along the way. The team that sets off all three flares and transfers all four barrels to the finish line first wins while the last team to finish is automatically sent to the Arena.
  - Winners: Eva & Rodri
- La Guerra Fría: One team member must feel through a covered box at one end of a course for three cubes with shapes on each face. They must then meet their partner describe the pattern to them so they can assemble the cubes using puzzle pieces at the other end of the course. However, teams must immerse themselves in an ice bath at the middle of the course while communicating the descriptions. The first team to correctly assemble their cubes wins while the last team is automatically sent to the Arena.
  - Winners: Oky & Sol
- Te Cayó la Ficha: Each player begins with a six-by-five board. Throughout the challenge, they must search the Estadio Tomás Adolfo Ducó for their colored tokens, and can either place the tokens on their board to try and line up four tokens in a row or flip the tokens over and place them on an opponent's board to block them. The first male and female player to line up four tokens on their board wins while the last male and female player to do so are automatically sent to the Arena.
  - Winners: Eva & Rodri

=== Arena games ===
- Enredo Piramidal: Teams have 15 minutes to create as many knots as they can using a 35-metre rope within a pyramid structure. After those 15 minutes are up, teams switch positions and must untie their opponent's knots. The first team to untie their opponent's knots and drag the rope across a marked line wins.
  - Played by: Adro & Eva vs. Burlando & Carolina
- Hacete la Rata: Teams begin inside a giant steel wheel connected to a 120-metre rope with a ball at the end. They must spin the wheel to unravel the rope and pull the ball towards them. The first team to pull the ball towards their wheel twice wins.
  - Played by: Adro & Fernanda vs. Floppy & Lizardo
- Me Muevo Te Muevas: Teams must stand on and tilt two platforms to maneuver five balls through a table maze. The first team to move all five balls to the end of the maze wins.
  - Played by: Claudia & Oky vs. Jujuy & Morita
- En Tu Cara: Teams must stack cinder blocks on a box to release a set of balls. One team member must then throw the balls at ten targets of their opponent's faces while their partner tries to block their opponent's shots. The first team to hit all ten targets wins.
  - Played by: Benja & Fernanda vs. Juli & Lio Ferro
- Rotas Cadenas: Teams open six panels at the top of a tall wall to reveal six trivia questions. They must search among several medicine balls wrapped in chains for six with the answers on them, and hang them on hooks below their respective question. The first team to correctly answer all six questions wins.
  - Played by: Adro & Virgie vs. Claudia & Rodri
- Tire y Empuje: Each round, players begin tethered to their opponent at the center of the Arena. They must knock over their three stacks of blocks at the boundary of the Arena while their opponent tries to do the same. The first player to knock over all three stacks wins the round. The first player to win two rounds wins the elimination.
  - Played by: Adro vs. Oky, Claudia vs. Fernanda

=== Final Challenge ===
The remaining eight players competed in the Final Challenge. The first part of the Final Challenge consisted of four timed stages (or etapas) which players complete in male-female pairs; the Algorithm decided new pairs for each stage. At the end of Stage 4, the two individuals with the slowest overall times were eliminated.

- Stage 1: Teams must collectively cycle 30 km on stationary bikes before proceeding to the end of the stage.
- Stage 2: Teams must cycle bicycles to a river. There, each team member must swim to different sides of the river to collect bags of puzzle pieces from a platform. After returning the puzzle pieces to their station, teams must then run down a path to view and memorize an answer key before recreating the key at their station using the puzzle pieces and proceeding to the end of the stage.
- Stage 3: Teams must use a plank and three barrels to cross a field without touching the ground before proceeding to the end of the stage.
- Stage 4: Teams must push a car across a field before proceeding to the end of the stage where each individual's time from the four stages are calculated. The two players with the slowest overall times are eliminated from the Final Challenge.
  - Eliminated: Juli (8th place - 3 hours, 3 minutes, 18 seconds)
  - Eliminated: Lio Ferro (7th place - 2 hours 58 minutes, 33 seconds)

In the second part of the Final Challenge, the remaining six contestants complete three continuous stages individually. At the end of the third stage, each contestant's overall time from the entire Final Challenge is totalled to determine the winner of Argentina: El Desafío, who also receives ARG$15,000,000.

- Stage 5: Players must pull a sled across a field then arrange four cubes so that each side shows four unique symbols before proceeding to the next stage.
- Stage 6: Players must throw golf balls from behind a marked line to hit a hanging target before cycling to the next checkpoint.
- Stage 7: Players must transfer seven tyres labelled with the names of Argentinian cities down a track and arrange them on a pole by latitude before proceeding to the finish line. After each player finishes, the results are announced.

Final results

- Winner: Sol (3 hours, 2 minutes, 0 seconds)
- Runner-up: Oky (3 hours, 23 minutes, 0 seconds)
- Third place: Yeyo (3 hours, 34 minutes, 7 seconds)
- Fourth place: Rodri (3 hours, 38 minutes, 58 seconds)
- Fifth place: Eva (4 hours, 13 minutes, 26 seconds)
- Sixth place: Claudia (4 hours, 14 minutes, 20 seconds)

== Game summary ==
Episode		Winner(s)	Arena contestants		Arena game	Arena outcome	
#	Challenge	Winner(s)	Last place	Winners' pick	Arena game	Winners	Eliminated
1/2	El Patrón Letal	Juli & Oky	Burlando & Carolina	Adro & Eva	Enredo Piramidal	Adro & Eva	Burlando & Carolina
3/4	Remo y Corona	Juli & Rodri	Floppy & Lizardo	Adro & Fernanda	Hacete la Rata	Adro & Fernanda	Floppy & Lizardo
5/6	Respuesta Boleadora	Rodri & Virgie	Jujuy & Morita	Claudia & Oky	Me Muevo Te Muevas	Claudia & Oky	Jujuy & Morita
7/8	Habemus Barril	Eva & Rodri	Benja & Fernanda	Juli & Lio Ferro	En Tu Cara	Juli & Lio Ferro	Benja & Fernanda
9/10	La Guerra Fría	Oky & Sol	Adro & Virgie	Claudia & Rodri	Rotas Cadenas	Claudia & Rodri	Adro & Virgie
11/12	Te Cayó la Ficha	Eva	Claudia	Fernanda	Tire y Empuje	Claudia	Fernanda
11/12	Te Cayó la Ficha	Rodri	Oky	Adro	Tire y Empuje	Oky	Adro
13/14	Final Challenge	Sol	2nd: Oky; 3rd: Yeyo; 4th: Rodri; 5th: Eva; 6th: Claudia; 7th: Lio Ferro; 8th: Juli				

=== Episode progress ===
Contestants	Episodes						
Contestants	1/2	3/4	5/6	7/8	9/10	11/12	Finale
Sol	SAFE	SAFE	SAFE	SAFE	WIN	SAFE	WINNER
Oky	WIN	SAFE	ELIM	SAFE	WIN	ELIM	SECOND
Yeyo	SAFE	SAFE	SAFE	SAFE	SAFE	SAFE	THIRD
Rodri	SAFE	WIN	WIN	WIN	ELIM	WIN	FOURTH
Eva	ELIM	SAFE	SAFE	WIN	SAFE	WIN	FIFTH
Claudia	SAFE	SAFE	ELIM	SAFE	ELIM	ELIM	SIXTH
Lio Ferro	SAFE	SAFE	SAFE	ELIM	SAFE	SAFE	SEVENTH
Juli	WIN	WIN	SAFE	ELIM	SAFE	SAFE	EIGHTH
Adro	ELIM	ELIM	SAFE	SAFE	OUT	OUT	
Fernanda	SAFE	ELIM	SAFE	OUT		OUT	
Virgie	SAFE	SAFE	WIN	SAFE	OUT		
Benja	SAFE	SAFE	SAFE	OUT			
Jujuy	SAFE	SAFE	OUT				
Morita	SAFE	SAFE	OUT				
Floppy	SAFE	OUT					
Lizardo	SAFE	OUT					
Burlando	OUT						
Carolina	OUT						

Competition key
The contestant won the Final Challenge
The contestant lost the Final Challenge
The contestant was eliminated during the Final Challenge
The contestant won the daily challenge
The contestant was not selected for the Arena
The contestant won the elimination in the Arena
The contestant lost in the Arena and was eliminated

== Team progress ==
From episodes 1 to 10, and the Final Challenge, the Algorithm randomly determined pairs for each cycle of the game.

Contestants	Episodes									
Contestants	1/2	3/4	5/6	7/8	9/10	11/12	Finale			
Sol	Morita	Benja	Lio Ferro	Yeyo	Oky	Individual	Lio	Oky	Rodri	Yeyo
Oky	Juli	Jujuy	Claudia	Virgie	Sol	Individual	Claudia	Sol	Eva	Juli
Yeyo	Jujuy	Eva	Fernanda	Sol	Juli	Individual	Eva	Claudia	Juli	Sol
Rodri	Floppy	Juli	Virgie	Eva	Claudia	Individual	Juli	Eva	Sol	Claudia
Eva	Adro	Yeyo	Benja	Rodri	Lio Ferro	Individual	Yeyo	Rodri	Oky	Lio
Claudia	Lizardo	Morita	Oky	Adro	Rodri	Individual	Oky	Yeyo	Lio	Rodri
Lio Ferro	Fernanda	Virgie	Sol	Juli	Eva	Individual	Sol	Juli	Claudia	Eva
Juli	Oky	Rodri	Adro	Lio Ferro	Yeyo	Individual	Rodri	Lio	Yeyo	Oky
Adro	Eva	Fernanda	Juli	Claudia	Virgie	Individual				
Fernanda	Lio Ferro	Adro	Yeyo	Benja		Individual				
Virgie	Benja	Lio Ferro	Rodri	Oky	Adro					
Benja	Virgie	Sol	Eva	Fernanda						
Jujuy	Yeyo	Oky	Morita							
Morita	Sol	Claudia	Jujuy							
Floppy	Rodri	Lizardo								
Lizardo	Claudia	Floppy								
Burlando	Carolina									
Carolina	Burlando									

== Reception ==
=== Viewing figures ===
No.	Air date	Timeslot (ART)	HH rating (Note: Audience averages are measured only in the Greater Buenos Aires area, according to data from Kantar Ibope Media.)
1	13 February 2023	Monday 9:15 p.m.	20.1
2	14 February 2023	Tuesday 9:15 p.m.	14.7
3	15 February 2023	Wednesday 9:15 p.m.	15.6
4	16 February 2023	Thursday 9:15 p.m.	15.7
5	20 February 2023	Monday 9:15 p.m.	11.5
6	21 February 2023	Tuesday 9:15 p.m.	13.5
7	22 February 2023	Wednesday 9:15 p.m.	12.1
8	23 February 2023	Thursday 9:15 p.m.	14.9
9	27 February 2023	Monday 9:15 p.m.	13.4
10	28 February 2023	Tuesday 9:15 p.m.	13.6
11	1 March 2023	Wednesday 9:15 p.m.	10.6
12	2 March 2023	Thursday 9:15 p.m.	13.1
13	6 March 2023	Monday 9:15 p.m.	12.7
14	7 March 2023	Tuesday 9:15 p.m.	14.5

==== Special episode ====
The season also featured a special episode which was uploaded to Paramount+ but did not air on Telefe. The special involved host Marley interviewing the eight finalists and having their family members visit them ahead of the Final Challenge.
