= Celebrity Ex on the Beach series 4 =

Celebrity Ex on the Beach
- Series 4
- No. of episodes: 10

Release
- Original network: Paramount+
- Original release: 31 March – 2 June 2026

Series chronology
- ← Previous; Series 3

The fourth series of Celebrity Ex on the Beach began airing on 31 March 2026 on Paramount+. The series was filmed in Tenerife. The cast for the series was announced on 4 March 2026.

== Cast ==
The cast members appearing in the series were announced on 4 March 2026.

- **Bold** indicates original cast member; all other cast were brought into the series as an ex.

Episodes	Name	Age	Notability	Exes
10	**Amy Kenyon**	28	Married at First Sight star	—N/a
10	**Chase DeMoor**	29	Professional boxer and Too Hot to Handle star	Joena Steilen
10	**Dani Imbert**	27	The Only Way Is Essex cast member	Kane Taylor, Reiss Boyce, Liam Blackwell
10	**Freddie Powell**	32	Love Is Blind: UK star	Chloe Hamilton
5	**Helen Flanagan**	35	Former Coronation Street actress	—N/a
10	**Izzy Fairthorne**	26	Too Hot to Handle star	Rogan O'Connor
10	**John Grimes**	34	Jedward singer and The X Factor contestant	Sarah Carragher
10	**Toby Aromolaran**	26	Love Island contestant and footballer	Hannah Kenyon
5	Rogan O'Connor	36	Ex on the Beach star	Izzy Fairthorne
9	Hannah Kenyon	28	Model	Toby Aromolaran, Ronnie Vint
6	Kane Taylor	25	—N/a	Dani Imbert
8	Curtis Pritchard	29	Love Island contestant	Sophie Sheridan, Danielle Sellers
8	Joena Steilen	25	Love Island Germany VIP contestant	Chase DeMoor
6	Sophie Sheridan	25	—N/a	Curtis Pritchard
3	Reiss Boyce	34	Married at First Sight star	Dani Imbert
5	Ronnie Vint	29	Love Island contestant	Hannah Kenyon
5	Sarah Carragher	32	—N/a	John Grimes
3	Danielle Sellers	30	Love Island contestant	Curtis Pritchard
2	Chloe Hamilton		—N/a	Freddie Powell

=== Duration of cast ===
Cast members	Episodes									
Cast members	1	2	3	4	5	6	7	8	9	10
Amy										
Chase										
Dani										
Freddie										
Helen										
Izzy										
John										
Toby										
Rogan										
Hannah										
Kane										
Curtis										
Joena										
Sophie										
Reiss										
Ronnie										
Sarah										
Danielle										
Chloe										

Table Key
Key: = "Cast member" is featured in this episode
Key: = "Cast member" arrives on the beach
Key: = "Cast member" has an ex arrive on the beach
Key: = "Cast member" has two exes arrive on the beach
Key: = "Cast member" arrives on the beach and has an ex arrive during the same episode
Key: = "Cast member" leaves the beach
Key: = "Cast member" has an ex arrive on the beach and leaves during the same episode
Key: = "Cast member" arrives on the beach and leaves during the same episode
Key: = "Cast member" features in this episode as a guest
Key: = "Cast member" does not feature in this episode

== Episodes ==
No. overall	No. in season	Title	Original release date
38	1	"This Could Be Trouble"	31 March 2026
39	2	"Truth Or Dare?"	7 April 2026
40	3	"Takes Two To Tango"	14 April 2026
41	4	"Storm Sophie"	21 April 2026
42	5	"In A Pickles"	28 April 2026
43	6	"Ex-Tra Terrestials Incoming"	5 May 2026
44	7	"Just In Chase"	12 May 2026
45	8	"Dani-Hell!"	19 May 2026
46	9	"Three's a Crowd"	26 May 2026
47	10	"Episode 10"	2 June 2026
