= The Challenge: USA =

Reality competition show

- Genre: Reality competition
- Created by: Mary-Ellis Bunim; Jonathan Murray
- Inspired by: The Challenge
- Presented by: T. J. Lavin
- Country of origin: United States
- Original language: English
- No. of seasons: 2
- No. of episodes: 26

Production
- Executive producers: Julie Pizzi; Justin Booth
- Production companies: Bunim/Murray Productions; MTV Entertainment Studios

Original release
- Network: CBS
- Release: July 6, 2022 – October 19, 2023

Related
- Big Brother; Love Island; Survivor; The Amazing Race; The Challenge; The Challenge: World Championship

The Challenge: USA is a spin-off of the long running reality television series The Challenge that aired on CBS from July 6, 2022, to October 19, 2023.

== Background ==
The Challenge: USA features cast members from CBS' reality shows: Big Brother, Love Island, Survivor, and The Amazing Race.

In February 2022, a new series of international seasons was announced to air later in the year. The series is comprised four new editions of The Challenge which included The Challenge: USA followed by The Challenge: Australia, The Challenge Argentina: El Desafío and The Challenge UK. These local renditions were followed by a fifth series in which available winners and select contestants of each series would compete again in Cape Town, South Africa on another season titled The Challenge: World Championship, which aired on Paramount+.

The show's second season expanded casting to include contestants from the MTV series competing against CBS cast members, and premiered on August 10, 2023. Unlike the first season, the second installment did not feature any cast member from Love Island.

== Seasons ==
=== Series overview ===
Season	Episodes	Originally released		Contestants
Season	Episodes	First released	Last released	Contestants
1	12	July 6, 2022	September 14, 2022	28
2	14	August 10, 2023	October 19, 2023	24

=== Season 1 (2022) ===
No. overall	No. in season	Title	Original release date	Prod. code	U.S. viewers (millions)
1	1	"The United States of Challenge"	July 6, 2022	101	2.33
2	2	"Oh Say Can You See Tiffany"	July 13, 2022	102	2.20
3	3	"Declarations of Independence"	July 20, 2022	103	2.13
4	4	"Liberty and Justice For All"	July 27, 2022	104	2.18
5	5	"In Tyson We Trust"	August 3, 2022	105	2.08
6	6	"A Civil War"	August 10, 2022	106	2.19
7	7	"State of the Unions"	August 17, 2022	107	2.19
8	8	"Independence Day"	August 24, 2022	108	2.10
9	9	"Nevertheless She Persisted"	August 31, 2022	109	1.94
10	10	"Pledges of Allegiance"	September 7, 2022	110	2.11
11	11	"Home of the Brave"	September 14, 2022	111	1.76
12	12	"Home of the Brave"	September 14, 2022	112	1.76

=== Season 2 (2023) ===
No. overall	No. in season	Title	Original release date	Prod. code	U.S. viewers (millions)
13	1	"The Riskiest Season Yet"	August 10, 2023	201	1.74
14	2	"Blurred Battle Lines"	August 13, 2023	202	1.76
15	3	"Civil War"	August 17, 2023	203	1.42
16	4	"Double Crossed and Sideswiped"	August 20, 2023	204	1.62
17	5	"Operation Hat Trick"	August 24, 2023	205	1.46
18	6	"A Really Good Looking Underdog"	August 27, 2023	206	1.69
19	7	"Give Me Liberty, or Give Me Love"	August 31, 2023	207	1.54
20	8	"Independence Day"	September 7, 2023	208	1.49
21	9	"Enemy of the State"	September 14, 2023	209	1.45
22	10	"A Less Perfect Union"	September 21, 2023	210	1.50
23	11	"Slippery Business"	September 28, 2023	211	1.44
24	12	"Revenge Amongst the Ruins"	October 5, 2023	212	1.41
25	13	"The Treason for the Season"	October 12, 2023	213	1.49
26	14	"The Pursuit of Glory"	October 19, 2023	214	1.75
