= Celebrity Ex on the Beach series 3 =

Celebrity Ex on the Beach
- Series 3
- No. of episodes: 10

Release
- Original network: MTV; Paramount+
- Original release: 19 March – 13 May 2024

Series chronology
- ← Previous; Series 2 Next → Series 4

The third series of Celebrity Ex on the Beach began airing on 18 March 2024 on Paramount+ and 19 March 2024 on MTV UK and Ireland. The series was confirmed in February 2024 when the premiere date and the list of participants were announced, who, like its two predecessors, are celebrities. It was filmed again in Gran Canaria.

== Cast ==
The list of famous cast members was released on 12 February 2024, for the first time not only the singles but also a group of former celebrities were announced.

- **Bold** indicates original cast member; all other cast were brought into the series as an ex.

Episodes	Name	Age	Notability	Exes
10	**Ashley Resch**	27	Playboy model	Zay Wilson
10	**Chloe Veitch**	24	Reality television star	Joel Motton, Callum Izzard, Meile Bishop
10	**Finley Tapp**	23	TV personality	Paige Turley
4	**Ivorian Doll**	25	Rapper singer	—N/a
8	**James Pendergrass**	24	Too Hot To Handle star	Parker Abbott
10	**Jarred Evans**	31	FBOY Island	—N/a
10	**Joe Garratt**	27	Love Island UK star	—N/a
10	**Tamara Joy**	34	MAFS Australia star	Jake Ellis, Craig Shipley
7	**Yazmin "Yaz" Oukhellou**	29	The Only Way Is Essex star	James "Lockie" Lock
7	Jake Ellis	37	The Bachelorette Australia star	Tamara Joy
10	Paige Turley	26	Love Island UK star	Finley Tapp
4	Chloe Brockett	22	The Only Way Is Essex star	
5	Parker Abbott	23	The Circle US star	James Pendergrass
7	Joel Motton	30	—N/a	Chloe Veitch
4	Craig Shipley	32	—N/a	Tamara Joy
5	James "Lockie" Lock	36	The Only Way Is Essex star	Yazmin Oukhellou
5	Jessika Power	31	MAFS Australia star	—N/a
4	Callum Izzard	28	Ibiza Weekender star	Chloe Veitch
2	Zay Wilson	28	The Ultimatum: Marry or Move On	Ashley Resch
1	Meile Bishop	28	—N/a	Chloe Veitch

=== Duration of cast ===
Cast members	Episodes									
Cast members	1	2	3	4	5	6	7	8	9	10
Ashley										
Chloe V										
Finn										
Ivorian										
James										
Jarred										
Joe										
Tamara										
Yaz										
Jake										
Paige										
Chloe B										
Parker										
Joel										
Craig										
Lockie										
Jessika										
Callum										
Zay										
Meile										

Table Key
Key: = "Cast member" is featured in this episode
Key: = "Cast member" arrives on the beach
Key: = "Cast member" has an ex arrive on the beach
Key: = "Cast member" has two exes arrive on the beach
Key: = "Cast member" arrives on the beach and has an ex arrive during the same episode
Key: = "Cast member" leaves the beach
Key: = "Cast member" has an ex arrive on the beach and leaves during the same episode
Key: = "Cast member" arrives on the beach and leaves during the same episode
Key: = "Cast member" features in this episode as a guest
Key: = "Cast member" does not feature in this episode

== Episodes ==
No. overall	No. in season	Title	Original release date	MTV air date
28	1	"Dinner dates with a side of ex"	18 March 2024	19 March 2024
29	2	"Blindsided"	18 March 2024	19 March 2024
30	3	"I'm Gone"	25 March 2024	26 March 2024
31	4	"Love's A Bumpy Road"	1 April 2024	2 April 2024
32	5	"The Lion Ex"	8 April 2024	9 April 2024
33	6	"The Night Beach"	15 April 2024	16 April 2024
34	7	"The Only Way Is Ex"	22 April 2024	23 April 2024
35	8	"History Repeating Itself"	29 April 2024	30 April 2024
36	9	"Hanging On By A Thread"	6 May 2024	14 May 2024
37	10	"Burning Ceremony"	14 May 2024	21 May 2024
