= Celebrity Ex on the Beach series 2 =

Second series of Celebrity Ex on the Beach

Celebrity Ex on the Beach
- Series 2
- No. of episodes: 12

Release
- Original network: MTV
- Original release: 15 February – 3 May 2022

Series chronology
- ← Previous; Series 1 Next → Series 3

The second series of Celebrity Ex on the Beach began airing on 15 February 2022. The series was confirmed in September 2021 when it was announced that filming had begun and would feature another full cast of celebrities rather than civilians. This series was filmed in Gran Canaria.

== Cast ==
The list of celebrity cast members was released on 25 January 2022. They include five men; RuPaul's Drag Race UK contestant A'Whora, The Only Way Is Essex cast member James "Lockie" Lock, star of Too Hot To Handle Kori Sampson, Love Island UK contestant Mike Boateng, and Geordie Shore's Nathan Henry, as well as four women; stars of Love Island UK Kaz Crossley and Megan Barton-Hanson, Married at First Sight Australia cast member KC Osborne, and Paradise Hotel Norway islander Sofie Karlstad.

- **Bold** indicates original cast member; all other cast were brought into the series as an ex.

Episodes	Name	Age	Notability	Exes
12	**James "Lockie" Lock**	35	The Only Way Is Essex star	Anya Carter, Gemma Pell
9	**Kaz Crossley**	26	Love Island UK star	Theo Campbell
12	**KC Osborne**	33	Married at First Sight Australia star	Michael Goonan
12	**Kori Sampson**	25	Too Hot To Handle star	Faye Mill (Sofie Karlstad)
12	**Megan Barton-Hanson**	27	Love Island UK star	Emelle Smith
12	**Michael "Mike" Boateng**	26	Love Island UK star	Lisa Steele
12	**Nathan Henry**	30	Geordie Shore star	Declan Doyle, Tommy Baljet
12	**Sofie Karlstad**	24	Paradise Hotel Norway star	(Kori Sampson)
9	**A'Whora**	25	RuPaul's Drag Race UK queen	—N/a
12	Theo Campbell	30	Love Island UK star	Kaz Crossley, Lexi Taylor, Gemma Pell
5	Tommy Baljet	34	Prince Charming Netherlands star	Nathan Henry
10	Ella Rae Wise	21	The Only Way Is Essex star	Kris Boyson
4	Michael Goonan	30	Married at First Sight Australia star	KC Osborne
8	Kris Boyson	33	Reality TV personality & fitness instructor	Ella Rae Wise
7	Declan Doyle	31	Model & barber	Nathan Henry
5	Lisa Steele	30	—N/a	Mike Boateng
4	Anya Carter	25	—N/a	James Lock
3	Faye Mill	25	—N/a	Kori Sampson
2	Lexi Taylor	31	—N/a	Theo Campbell
2	Rudi Hewitt	26	Absolutely Ascot star	(Anya Carter)
2	Emelle Smith	33	The Circle star	Megan Barton-Hanson
1	Gemma Pell	28	Actress & presenter	Theo Campbell, James Lock

=== Duration of cast ===
Cast members	Episodes											
Cast members	1	2	3	4	5	6	7	8	9	10	11	12
Lockie												
Kaz												
KC												
Kori												
Megan												
Mike												
Nathan												
Sofie												
A'Whora												
Theo												
Tommy												
Ella												
Michael												
Kris												
Declan												
Lisa												
Anya												
Faye												
Lexi												
Rudi												
Emelle												
Gemma												

Table Key
Key: = "Cast member" is featured in this episode
Key: = "Cast member" arrives on the beach
Key: = "Cast member" has an ex arrive on the beach
Key: = "Cast member" has two exes arrive on the beach
Key: = "Cast member" arrives on the beach and has an ex arrive during the same episode
Key: = "Cast member" leaves the beach
Key: = "Cast member" has an ex arrive on the beach and leaves during the same episode
Key: = "Cast member" arrives on the beach and leaves during the same episode
Key: = "Cast member" features in this episode as a guest
Key: = "Cast member" does not feature in this episode

== Episodes ==
No. overall	No. in season	Title	Original release date	Duration
16	1	"Celeb Surprises"	15 February 2022	60 minutes
17	2	"Love Triangle"	22 February 2022	60 minutes
18	3	"SOS"	1 March 2022	60 minutes
19	4	"Secret Kisses"	8 March 2022	60 minutes
20	5	"Loose Lips"	15 March 2022	60 minutes
21	6	"True Colours"	22 March 2022	60 minutes
22	7	"Kori Gets the Hump"	29 March 2022	60 minutes
23	8	"Double Whammy"	5 April 2022	60 minutes
24	9	"Theo's 'Down Under' Dilemma"	12 April 2022	60 minutes
25	10	"The Cherry On The Cake"	19 April 2022	60 minutes
26	11	"Going Going Gone!"	26 April 2022	60 minutes
27	12	"Episode 12"	3 May 2022	60 minutes
