= The Challenge: World Championship =

Reality competition series

- Genre: Reality competition
- Created by: Mary-Ellis Bunim; Jonathan Murray
- Based on: The Challenge
- Presented by: Brihony Dawson; Mark Wright; Marley; T. J. Lavin
- Original language: English
- No. of seasons: 1
- No. of episodes: 12

Production
- Executive producers: Julie Pizzi; Justin Booth
- Production locations: Cape Town, South Africa
- Production company: Bunim/Murray Productions

Original release
- Network: Paramount+
- Release: 8 March – 17 May 2023

Related
- The Challenge; The Challenge: All Stars; The Challenge: USA; The Challenge: Australia; The Challenge Argentina: El Desafío; The Challenge UK

The Challenge: World Championship is a spin-off of the reality competition series The Challenge. The series features notable veterans from the MTV flagship series competing alongside the winners and select contestants from four spin-off seasons: The Challenge Argentina: El Desafío, The Challenge: Australia, The Challenge: USA (season 1) and The Challenge UK.

The series is hosted by T. J. Lavin with the hosts of the three international adaptations of the series: Brihony Dawson, Mark Wright and Marley making a guest appearance in the premiere episode. Additionally, Dawson guest-hosted an episode while Lavin was inducted in the BMX Hall of Fame. The series premiered on Paramount+ on 8 March 2023.

== Background ==
In February 2022, a four international adaptations of The Challenge were announced to air later in the year: The Challenge: USA, The Challenge: Australia, The Challenge Argentina: El Desafío and The Challenge UK. The Challenge: World Championship is a special miniseries in which winners and select contestants of each series (known as "Global MVPs") compete alongside cast members from the MTV series (known as "Challenge legends").

In addition to the title of The Challenge: World Championship champions, the winners also receive US$500,000 (also displayed as ARG$89,475,607, A$726,638 and GBP£413,390).

Sol Pérez, the sole winner of The Challenge Argentina: El Desafío, intended to compete on the season but was unable to receive the required yellow fever vaccination in time.

== Format ==
The Challenge: World Championship consists of a daily challenge, nomination process, winners' selection and an elimination round. The first episode had only the "MVPs" (contestants from the spin-off seasons) competing individually. After the first elimination, each MVP picked their "Legend" partner (players from the flagship series) based on the order they completed the "Qualifier" challenge. Afterwards, the format of the game is as follows:

- Daily Challenge: Teams compete in a daily challenge where the last-place team is automatically sent to the elimination round. The winning team is immune and earns the ability to select a second team to compete in the elimination round between the two teams later selected at nominations.
- Nominations: Teams, besides the winners and last-place team of the daily challenge, vote for two teams to compete in the elimination round. The two teams that receive the most votes are nominated for elimination. For episode 11, teams only vote for one team instead of two.
- Eliminations ("The Arena"): At the Arena, the winners from the daily challenge vote between the two nominated teams to select the second team to compete in the elimination round against the last-place team. The winners of the elimination round remain in the competition while the defeated team is eliminated.

== Contestants ==
Male contestants	Known for	Finish
Jordan Wiseley	The Real World: Portland	Winner
Danny McCray	Survivor 41	Runner-up
Troy Cullen	Australian Ninja Warrior 4	Third place
Theo Campbell	Love Island UK 3	Fourth place (Note: Theo was medically disqualified from the Final Challenge after sustaining an ankle injury during the "Loops of Hell" stage. Sarah was disqualified as a result of being Theo's partner)
Yes Duffy	Road Rules: Semester at Sea	Episode 11
Darrell Taylor	Road Rules: Campus Crawl	Episode 10
Tristan Phipps	Made in Chelsea 16	Episode 9
Benjamín "Benja" Alfonso	Actor	Episode 8
Ben Driebergen	Survivor: Heroes vs. Healers vs. Hustlers	Episode 8 (Note: In episode 8, Ben was medically removed from the competition due to illness. Kaycee was initially disqualified as a result of being Ben's partner. However, after this announcement, Amber withdrew from the competition due to illness (later learning that she was pregnant) and offered her place in the game to Kaycee. Therefore, Kaycee and Troy (Amber's partner) formed a new team ahead of the "Ripcord Roulette" challenge.)
Johnny "Bananas" Devenanzio	The Real World: Key West	Episode 7
Grant Crapp	Love Island Australia 1	Episode 6 (Note: Grant was medically disqualified from the competition after suffering a knee injury during the "Rocketman" challenge; Jonna was disqualified as a result of being Grant's partner.)
Wes Bergmann	The Real World: Austin	Episode 6
Rodrigo "Rodri" Cascón	Celebrity chef	Episode 4
Nelson Thomas	Are You the One? 3	Episode 3
Nathan Henry	Geordie Shore 10	Episode 1 (Note: At the episode 1 nominations, it was announced Nathan was medically disqualified from the competition; his departure was not shown on screen. As a result of uneven numbers, the "Pole Wrestle" elimination was played as a female elimination round.)

Female contestants	Known for	Finish
Kaz Crossley	Love Island UK 4	Winner
Tori Deal	Are You the One? 4	Runner-up
Kaycee Clark	Big Brother 20	Third place
Sarah Lacina	Survivor: Cagayan	Fourth place
Emily Seebohm	Olympian	Episode 11
Kiki Morris	The Bachelor Australia 4	Episode 10
KellyAnne Judd	The Real World: Sydney	Episode 9
Jodi Weatherton	Road Rules: X-Treme	Episode 8
Amber Borzotra	Big Brother 16	Episode 8
Justine Ndiba	Love Island USA 2	Episode 7
Jonna Mannion	The Real World: Cancun	Episode 6
Zara Zoffany	The Royal World	Episode 6
Nia Moore	The Real World: Portland	Episode 4
Sofia "Jujuy" Jiménez	Dancing with the Stars Argentina 2018	Episode 3
Claudia Albertario	Model and actress	Episode 1

=== Draft selections ===
After the first elimination, each Global MVP drafted their partner for the season from the Challenge Legends in the order they finished the "Qualifier" challenge.

Pick #	Global MVP	Challenge Legend	Team
1	Grant Crapp	Jonna Stephens	Grant & Jonna
2	Zara Zoffany	Wes Bergmann	Wes & Zara
3	Ben Driebergen	Kaycee Clark	Ben & Kaycee
4	Kaz Crossley	Jordan Wiseley	Jordan & Kaz
5	Danny McCray	Tori Deal	Danny & Tori
6	Justine Ndiba	Johnny "Bananas" Devenanzio	Bananas & Justine
7	Benjamin "Benja" Alfonso	Jodi Weatherton	Benja & Jodi
8	Kiki Morris	Darrell Taylor	Darrell & Kiki
9	Rodrigo "Rodri" Cascón	Nia Moore	Nia & Rodrigo
10	Emily Seebohm	Yes Duffy	Emily & Yes
11	Troy Cullen	Amber Borzotra	Amber & Troy
12	Sarah Lacina	Theo Campbell	Sarah & Theo
13	Tristan Phipps	KellyAnne Judd	KellyAnne & Tristan
14	Sofia "Jujuy" Jiménez	Nelson Thomas	Jujuy & Nelson

Each pair was also given team names of Team Argentina, Team Australia, Team UK or Team USA based on the nationality/spin-off season of the Global MVP:

Team Argentina
Team Australia
Team UK
Team USA

== Gameplay ==
=== Challenge games ===
- Qualifier: In a special challenge, each MVP individually undergoes a race around the Cape Town Stadium, completing five checkpoints along the way. The first male and female MVPs to finish wins while the last-place male and female MVPs are automatically sent to the Arena. Additionally, the order MVPs finish determine the order they draft their partner for the season after the first elimination.
  - Checkpoint 1 (Eat Your Heart Out): Players must consume a foul-tasting meal and two vegan shakes.
  - Checkpoint 2 (Hammer It Home): Players must use a sledgehammer to hit a tyre proportional to their bodyweight to the end of a lane.
  - Checkpoint 3 (On a Roll): Players must use a large cement cylinder to roll across a track without touching the ground.
  - Checkpoint 4 (Weight for It): Players must arrange several weighted cylinders from lightest to heaviest, where the characters printed on the cylinders form an alphanumeric code. They must then recreate the code using tiles at a nearby solving station.
  - Checkpoint 5 (Plant Your Flag): Players must roll a heavy flagpole with their national flag across a field and plant it at the end to finish.
  - Winners: Grant & Zara
- Chain Game: Teams race across several sand dunes to a shipwreck. From the shipwreck, teams must drag a 700-pound (320 kg) chain to one of several puzzles, which they must solve by looping the chain around poles to match the diagram. The further the puzzle is from the shipwreck, the easier it is to solve. After solving a puzzle, teams race back to the shipwreck to ring a bell. The first team to finish wins while the last-place team is automatically sent to the Arena.
  - Winners: Grant & Jonna
- Gates of Hell: Each round, teams race to the end of a 50-yard (46 m) corridor before a gate closes to progress to the next round, and are eliminated from the challenge if one or both team members do not reach the end in time. The last team standing wins. In the event of a stalemate after multiple rounds, a tiebreaker round is held where the first team member to reach the gate wins the challenge for their team. To determine last-place if multiple teams are eliminated in the same round, the last contestant to reach the gate loses the challenge and their team is automatically sent to the Arena.
  - Winners: Wes & Zara
- Flying Around: To begin, each team member must drink a foul-tasting smoothie in two minutes; teams receive a five-point penalty for the challenge if they cannot finish the smoothie in time and/or a two-point penalty if they regurgitate any of the smoothie. Afterwards, one team member is harnessed on the arm of a spinning excavator. They must catch rings their partner throws to them and attempt to land them in a container in the middle of the field. The team with the most rings scored wins while the last-place team is automatically sent to the Arena.
  - Winners: Darrell & Kiki
- Rocketman: One team member begins on one end of a giant inflatable airbag. Their partner must jump from a platform onto the other side of the airbag, attempting to launch them over three crossbars at varying heights. The more crossbars teams clear, the more seconds are deducted from their overall time. After landing in the water, each team member swims to collect one puzzle piece at separate platforms before combining them to solve a puzzle onshore and stop their time. The team with the fastest overall time wins while the twhile the last-place team is automatically sent to the Arena.
  - Winners: KellyAnne & Tristan
- Tunnel Time: Each Challenge Legend begins chained to a pole. Their Global MVP partner must grab a glowstick, enter a dark tunnel under the Castle of Good Hope and count the flags of Argentina, Australia, the UK and the United States on the walls. Afterwards, they must return to their board, multiply each flag's count by the provided number, then sum the four products to determine the code to unlock their partner. Teams then ring a nearby bell to stop their time, and there is a 45-minute time limit before teams time out. The team with the fastest time wins while the last-place team is automatically sent to the Arena. If multiple teams time out, last place is determined by how many correct numbers they have on their board.
  - Winners: Emily & Yes
- Ripcord Roulette: Played in three heats, teams begin suspended off the side of a building with five ripcords in front of them, and are asked trivia questions one at a time. If they answer correctly, they can a force another team to pull one of their ripcords. However, teams must pull one of their own ripcords if they answer incorrectly. Four of the ripcords are "dummies" while the fifth one drops teams if pulled, eliminating them from the heat. The last team standing in each heat advance to the winner's round while the first team to drop in each heat must participate in an additional loser's round. The last team standing in the winner's round wins while the first team dropped in the loser's round is automatically sent to the Arena.
  - Winners: KellyAnne & Tristan
- Highway Hijacking: Inspired by the upcoming film Transformers: Rise of the Beasts. One team member begins harnessed on top of a speeding truck while their partner begins in a super buggy inside the truck's trailer. The team member harnessed on the truck must jump onto an adjacent truck, collect a key and use it to unlock a detonator which opens the back of the truck's trailer when hit. After the detonator is hit, the team member in the super buggy must drive through the back of the trailer and to the finish line. The team with the fastest time wins while the last-place team is automatically sent to the Arena. Additionally, the winners also receive tickets to the world premiere of Transformers: Rise of the Beasts.
  - Winners: Jordan & Kaz
- Points Break: While tethered together, teams swim to six platforms in a lake to collect six of their puzzle pieces and return them to shore, one at a time. After collecting all six pieces, teams use them to solve a triangular puzzle, and must then correctly answer a question about the puzzle asking how many triangles it contains. Teams have three attempts to answer before they are disqualified from the challenge. The first team to finish wins while the last-place team is automatically sent to the Arena.
  - Winners: Emily & Yes
- Downfall: Teams must swim to a pair of rope ladders in the middle of a lake, climb to the middle and untie a large Challenge symbol tied to the rungs. After untying the symbol, teams can select another team to have their ladder dropped, eliminating them from the challenge. After all teams finish untying their symbol or are eliminated, surviving teams can continue climbing to the top of the ladder and solve a math puzzle. The first team to solve the puzzle wins while the first team eliminated from the challenge is automatically sent to the Arena.
  - Winners: Sarah & Theo

=== Arena games ===
- Pole Wrestle: Players begin at the center of the Arena with both hands on a metal pole. The first player to wrestle the pole out of their opponent's hands three times wins.
  - Played by: Claudia vs. Kiki
- Tether Brawl: One team member begins lying on a sling suspended over the Arena. From the ground, their partner must swing them back and forth so they can collect eight hanging blocks and drop them at their end of the Arena. If a block falls in the center of the Arena, both teams may attempt to claim it. After collecting eight blocks, the team member on the ground must stack the blocks to form a tower. The first team to assemble their tower wins.
  - Played by: Jujuy & Nelson vs. KellyAnne & Tristan
- Oiled Up: Teams must take buckets of oil up a steep ramp to fill a container at the top so that a ball rises to a marked line. The first team to finish wins.
  - Played by: Benja & Jodi vs. Nia & Rodrigo
- Herculean Strength: One team member must hold up two weighted bars for as long as possible. Their partner can solve math equations to add weight to their opponent's bars, making it more difficult for them to hold on. Easier equations add 11 pounds (5.0 kg) while harder equations add 22 pounds (10.0 kg). The last player holding up their bars wins the elimination for their team.
  - Played by: Ben & Kaycee vs. Wes & Zara
- Lock, Stack & Barrel: Each team has a stack of barrels with symbols printed on them. They must study a 16-symbol answer key (depicting the flags of Argentina, Australia, the UK and the United States), find the 16 matching barrels and arrange them in a four-by-four grid to replicate the answer key. The first team to finish wins.
  - Played by: Bananas & Justine vs. Jordan & Kaz
- Spin Me Round: One team member begins strapped to a rotatable platform. Their partner must spin and hold the platform upright so they can see and describe an answer key behind a wall. The team member holding the platform must then recreate the answer key their partner described using tiles on a board. The first team to correctly recreate the answer key wins.
  - Played by: Benja & Jodi vs. Kaycee & Troy
- Hands Off: Teams must use giant chopsticks to transfer nine geometric puzzle pieces over a balance beam, one at a time. Each time they drop a puzzle piece, they must restart that piece. After transferring all nine puzzle pieces, the first team to solve the puzzle wins.
  - Played by: Darrell & Kiki vs. KellyAnne & Tristan
- Breakthrough: Teams must use a rope to swing through a brick wall, reassemble the wall to reveal a math equation, and solve it to reveal the code to unlock a second rope. Teams then use the second rope to swing through a thick drywall to reach a puzzle. The first team to solve the puzzle wins.
  - Played by: Darrell & Kiki vs. Kaycee & Troy
- Hall Brawl: Played in a male and female round. Each round, players of the designated gender must run through a narrow hallway, past their opponent and ring a bell at the opposite end. The first player to ring the bell wins the round for their team. The first team to win two rounds wins. If the score is tied after both rounds, a coin flip is held to determine which gender participates in the tiebreaker round.
  - Played by: Emily & Yes vs. Kaycee & Troy

=== Final Challenge ===
After the "Hall Brawl" elimination, teams boarded a train called The Fear Express to the start of the Final Challenge.

Day one

- Loops of Hell: Teams must run a four-mile (6.4 km) loop four times, completing one of four checkpoints after each loop. Only one team may complete a checkpoint at a time. During this stage, each team is also given a canister with their team's flag which they require later in the Final Challenge.
  - Crack the Code: Teams must solve several hints to determine a three-digit code.
  - Sick Smoothie: Each team member must drink a foul-tasting smoothie.
  - Throwing Shade: Teams must throw bolts into a container from behind a line, and land three in a row.
  - Weight for It: Teams must arrange ten weighted cylinders from lightest to heaviest, where the characters printed on the cylinders form a code which teams must arrange on an answer board.
- Eliminated: Sarah & Theo (4th place) (Note: Theo was medically disqualified from the Final Challenge after sustaining an ankle injury during the "Loops of Hell" stage. Sarah was disqualified as a result of being Theo's partner.)

Afterwards, teams return to The Fear Express and each team can select one member to receive an IV drip. Teams are then treated to a banquet and given a key (which they require later in the Final Challenge) before the Overnight Stage is announced.

- Overnight Stage ("Insomnia"): Teams must spend the night awake on The Fear Express, and contestants are shocked by a shock collar if they fall asleep. The following morning, the first team to complete the "Loops of Hell" stage receive one hour of sleep, second place receives 30 minutes and third place receives 15 minutes before the Final Challenge continues.

Day two

- Race to the Finish: Teams must cycle to the end of a trail, then follow several arrows on foot to the next checkpoint.
- Misery Mountain: Teams must use the canister and key they received during the previous day to solve a slide puzzle and unlock a message instructing them to race to the top of a mountain. Upon reaching the top of the mountain, teams find a sign instructing them to collect a key and return down to the finish line. The first team to reach the finish line are declared the winners of World Championship and receive US$500,000.
  - Winners: Jordan & Kaz ($500,000 - $250,000 each)
  - Runners-up: Danny & Tori
  - Third place: Kaycee & Troy

== Game summary ==
Episode		Winners	Arena contestants			Arena game	Arena outcome	
No.	Challenge	Winners	Last place	Nominated		Arena game	Winner(s)	Eliminated
1	Qualifier	Grant	Tristan	—N/a		Pole Wrestle	—N/a	
1	Qualifier	Zara	Claudia	Kaz	Kiki (Note: The contestant/team was voted in by the winners.)	Pole Wrestle	Kiki	Claudia
2/3	Chain Game	Grant & Jonna	Jujuy & Nelson	Benja & Jodi	KellyAnne & Tristan	Tether Brawl	KellyAnne & Tristan	Jujuy & Nelson
4	Gates of Hell	Wes & Zara	Nia & Rodrigo	Benja & Jodi	KellyAnne & Tristan	Oiled Up	Benja & Jodi	Nia & Rodrigo
5/6	Flying Around	Darrell & Kiki	Wes & Zara	Ben & Kaycee (Note: The episode 5 nominations ended in a stalemate after two teams tied for the second-most votes. Therefore, the "stalemate rule" was invoked where winners Darrell & Kiki could select any non-immune team to compete in the Arena.)		Herculean Strength	Ben & Kaycee	Wes & Zara
6	Rocketman	KellyAnne & Tristan	Grant & Jonna	Benja & Jodi	Emily & Yes	—N/a (Note: Due to Grant's medical disqualification from the competition, the elimination round in episode 6 was cancelled.)		
7	Tunnel Time	Emily & Yes	Jordan & Kaz	Bananas & Justine	Sarah & Theo	Lock, Stack & Barrel	Jordan & Kaz	Bananas & Justine
8	Ripcord Roulette	KellyAnne & Tristan	Benja & Jodi	Darrell & Kiki	Kaycee & Troy	Spin Me Round	Kaycee & Troy	Benja & Jodi
9	Highway Hijacking	Jordan & Kaz	Darrell & Kiki	Danny & Tori	KellyAnne & Tristan	Hands Off	Darrell & Kiki	KellyAnne & Tristan
10	Points Break	Emily & Yes	Darrell & Kiki	Kaycee & Troy (Note: The episode 10 nominations ended in a stalemate. Therefore, the "stalemate rule" was invoked where winners Emily & Yes could select any non-immune team to compete in the Arena.)		Breakthrough	Kaycee & Troy	Darrell & Kiki
11	Downfall	Sarah & Theo	Kaycee & Troy	Emily & Yes (Note: The episode 11 nominations ended in a stalemate. As the challenge winners Sarah & Theo already qualified for the Final Challenge, they were deemed ineligible to vote. Therefore, the losing team, Kaycee & Troy, were given the chance to vote any non-immune team as their opponents for the elimination.)		Hall Brawl	Kaycee & Troy	Emily & Yes
12	Final Challenge	Jordan & Kaz	2nd: Danny & Tori; 3rd: Kaycee & Troy; 4th: Sarah & Theo					

== Episode progress ==
Contestants	Episodes										
Contestants	1	2/3	4	5/6	6	7	8	9	10	11	Finale
Kaz	RISK	SAFE	SAFE	SAFE	SAFE	ELIM	SAFE	WIN	SAFE	SAFE	WINNER
Jordan	N/A	SAFE	SAFE	SAFE	SAFE	ELIM	SAFE	WIN	SAFE	SAFE	WINNER
Tori	N/A	SAFE	SAFE	SAFE	SAFE	SAFE	SAFE	RISK	SAFE	SAFE	SECOND
Danny	SAFE	SAFE	SAFE	SAFE	SAFE	SAFE	SAFE	RISK	SAFE	SAFE	SECOND
Kaycee	N/A	SAFE	SAFE	ELIM	SAFE	SAFE	ELIM	SAFE	ELIM	ELIM	THIRD
Troy	SAFE	SAFE	SAFE	SAFE	SAFE	SAFE	ELIM	SAFE	ELIM	ELIM	THIRD
Sarah	SAFE	SAFE	SAFE	SAFE	SAFE	RISK	SAFE	SAFE	SAFE	WIN	DQ
Theo	N/A	SAFE	SAFE	SAFE	SAFE	RISK	SAFE	SAFE	SAFE	WIN	MED
Emily	SAFE	SAFE	SAFE	SAFE	RISK	WIN	SAFE	SAFE	WIN	OUT	
Yes	N/A	SAFE	SAFE	SAFE	RISK	WIN	SAFE	SAFE	WIN	OUT	
Kiki	ELIM	SAFE	SAFE	WIN	SAFE	SAFE	RISK	ELIM	OUT		
Darrell	N/A	SAFE	SAFE	WIN	SAFE	SAFE	RISK	ELIM	OUT		
KellyAnne	N/A	ELIM	RISK	SAFE	WIN	SAFE	WIN	OUT			
Tristan	SAFE	ELIM	RISK	SAFE	WIN	SAFE	WIN	OUT			
Jodi	N/A	RISK	ELIM	SAFE	RISK	SAFE	OUT				
Benja	SAFE	RISK	ELIM	SAFE	RISK	SAFE	OUT				
Amber	N/A	SAFE	SAFE	SAFE	SAFE	SAFE	QUIT				
Ben	SAFE	SAFE	SAFE	ELIM	SAFE	SAFE	MED				
Justine	SAFE	SAFE	SAFE	SAFE	SAFE	OUT					
Bananas	N/A	SAFE	SAFE	SAFE	SAFE	OUT					
Jonna	N/A	WIN	SAFE	SAFE	DQ						
Grant	WIN	WIN	SAFE	SAFE	MED						
Zara	WIN	SAFE	WIN	OUT							
Wes	N/A	SAFE	WIN	OUT							
Nia	N/A	SAFE	OUT								
Rodrigo	SAFE	SAFE	OUT								
Jujuy	SAFE	OUT									
Nelson	N/A	OUT									
Claudia	OUT										
Nathan	MED										

Competition key
The contestant won the Final Challenge
The contestant lost the Final Challenge
The contestant won the daily challenge and was immune from elimination
The contestant was not selected for the Arena
The contestant was nominated for the Arena, but was not selected to compete
The contestant won the elimination round
The contestant lost the elimination round and was eliminated
The contestant was medically removed from the competition
The contestant was disqualified from the competition due to their partner being removed
The contestant withdrew from the competition

== Voting history ==
In episode 1, each MVP voted individually. Starting with episode 2, teams voted collectively.

	Episode
1
Nominated	Kaz; 9 of 12 votes
Nominated	Kiki; 7 of 12 votes
Winner's Pick	Kiki; 1 of 2 votes (Note: The episode 1 winner's decision ended in a tie vote after Grant and Zara voted differently. As the forthcoming elimination round was a female elimination round, Zara's vote for Kiki counted as the tiebreaker.)
Voter	Vote
Kaz	Justine, Sarah
Danny	Kaz, Kiki
Troy	Jujuy, Kaz
Sarah	Kaz, Kiki
Emily	Jujuy, Kaz
Kiki	Jujuy, Justine
Tristan	Jujuy, Justine
Benja	Kaz, Kiki
Ben	Kaz, Kiki
Justine	Kaz, Kiki
Grant	Kaz (Note: Winner's vote)
Zara	Kiki
Rodrigo	Kaz, Kiki
Jujuy	Kaz, Kiki

The Challenge: World Championship voting history
	Episode									
	2/3	4	5/6	6	7	8		9	10	11
Nominated	Benja & Jodi; 10 of 12 votes	Benja & Jodi; 8 of 11 votes	Stalemate (Note: The episode 5 nominations ended in a stalemate after Emily & Yes and Jordan & Kaz tied for the second-most votes. Therefore, the "stalemate rule" was invoked where winners Darrell & Kiki could select any non-immune team to compete in the Arena.)	Benja & Jodi; 6 of 9 votes	Sarah & Theo; 5 of 8 votes	Darrell & Kiki; 4 of 6 votes	Kaycee & Troy; 3 of 6 votes	Danny & Tori; 4 of 5 votes	Stalemate (Note: The episode 10 nominations ended in a stalemate when all four teams agreed to stalemate the vote. Therefore, the "stalemate rule" was invoked where winners Emily & Yes could select any non-immune team to compete in the Arena)	Stalemate (Note: The episode 11 nominations ended in a stalemate when all three teams agreed to vote themselves. As challenge winners Sarah & Theo already qualified to the Final Challenge, they were deemed ineligible to vote. Therefore, the last-place team from the challenge, Kaycee & Troy, were given the choice to vote for any non-immune team as their opponents for the elimination.)
Nominated	KellyAnne & Tristan; 10 of 12 votes	KellyAnne & Tristan; 8 of 11 votes	Stalemate	Emily & Yes; 5 of 9 votes	Bananas & Justine; 4 of 8 votes	Tie (Note: Danny & Tori and Kaycee & Troy tied for the second-most votes during the episode 8 nominations. Therefore, a revote was held to determine the second nominated team.)	Kaycee & Troy; 3 of 6 votes	KellyAnne & Tristan; 3 of 5 votes	Stalemate	Stalemate
Winner's Pick	KellyAnne & Tristan; Grant & Jonna's choice	Benja & Jodi; Wes & Zara's choice	Ben & Kaycee; Darrell & Kiki's choice		Bananas & Justine; Emily & Yes' choice	Kaycee & Troy; KellyAnne & Tristan's choice		KellyAnne & Tristan; Kaz & Jordan's choice	Kaycee & Troy; Emily & Yes' choice	
Teams	Vote									
Jordan & Kaz	Benja & Jodi, Wes & Zara	Benja & Jodi, Sarah & Theo	Emily & Yes, Grant & Jonna	Benja & Jodi, Emily & Yes		Darrell & Kiki, Kaycee & Troy	Kaycee & Troy	KellyAnne & Tristan		Jordan & Kaz
Danny & Tori	Benja & Jodi, KellyAnne & Tristan	Benja & Jodi, KellyAnne & Tristan	Benja & Jodi, KellyAnne & Tristan	Benja & Jodi, Jordan & Kaz	Benja & Jodi, Darrell & Kiki	Danny & Tori, Darrell & Kiki	Danny & Tori	Danny & Tori, KellyAnne & Tristan		Danny & Tori
Kaycee & Troy						Danny & Tori, Emily & Yes	Jordan & Kaz	Emily & Yes; Sarah & Theo		Emily & Yes
Sarah & Theo	Benja & Jodi, KellyAnne & Tristan	Benja & Jodi, KellyAnne & Tristan	Amber & Troy, Grant & Jonna	Amber & Troy, Benja & Jodi	Benja & Jodi, Darrell & Kiki	Darrell & Kiki, Kaycee & Troy	Kaycee & Troy	Danny & Tori, KellyAnne & Tristan		
Emily & Yes	Benja & Jodi, KellyAnne & Tristan	Benja & Jodi, KellyAnne & Tristan	Ben & Kaycee, Jordan & Kaz	Amber & Troy, Jordan & Kaz	Bananas & Justine	Darrell & Kiki, Kaycee & Troy	Kaycee & Troy	Danny & Tori, KellyAnne & Tristan	Kaycee & Troy	Emily & Yes
Darrell & Kiki	Benja & Jodi, KellyAnne & Tristan	Benja & Jodi, KellyAnne & Tristan	Ben & Kaycee	Benja & Jodi, Danny & Tori	Bananas & Justine, Sarah & Theo	Danny & Tori, Emily & Yes	Danny & Tori			
KellyAnne & Tristan	Benja & Jodi, Danny & Tori	Ben & Kaycee, Grant & Jonna	Emily & Yes, Grant & Jonna		Bananas & Justine, Sarah & Theo	Kaycee & Troy		Danny & Tori, Sarah & Theo		
Benja & Jodi	KellyAnne & Tristan, Wes & Zara	Ben & Kaycee, Jordan & Kaz	Grant & Jonna, Jordan & Kaz	Emily & Yes, Sarah & Theo	Bananas & Justine, Sarah & Theo					
Amber & Troy	Benja & Jodi, KellyAnne & Tristan	Benja & Jodi, KellyAnne & Tristan	Grant & Jonna, Jordan & Kaz	Emily & Yes, Sarah & Theo	Bananas & Justine, Sarah & Theo					
Ben & Kaycee	Benja & Jodi, KellyAnne & Tristan	Benja & Jodi, KellyAnne & Tristan	Emily & Yes, Grant & Jonna	Benja & Jodi, Emily & Yes	KellyAnne & Tristan, Sarah & Theo					
Bananas & Justine	Benja & Jodi, KellyAnne & Tristan	Benja & Jodi, KellyAnne & Tristan	Emily & Yes, Grant & Jonna	Benja & Jodi, Emily & Yes	Benja & Jodi, Darrell & Kiki					
Grant & Jonna	KellyAnne & Tristan	Benja & Jodi, KellyAnne & Tristan	Jordan & Kaz, Sarah & Theo							
Wes & Zara	Benja & Jodi, KellyAnne & Tristan	Benja & Jodi								
Nia & Rodrigo	KellyAnne & Tristan, Sarah & Theo									

== Episodes ==
Season 1
No.	Title	Original release date
1	"Run the World"	March 8, 2023
2	"When Worlds Collide"	March 8, 2023
3	"Us Against the World"	March 15, 2023
4	"World on Fire"	March 22, 2023
5	"Everybody Wants to Rule the World"	March 29, 2023
6	"Brave New World"	April 5, 2023
7	"The New World Order"	April 12, 2023
8	"What in the World?"	April 19, 2023
9	"Transform the World"	April 26, 2023
10	"Cruel World"	May 3, 2023
11	"Weight of the World"	May 10, 2023
12	"World Domination"	May 17, 2023
