= Callum Izzard =

English television personality

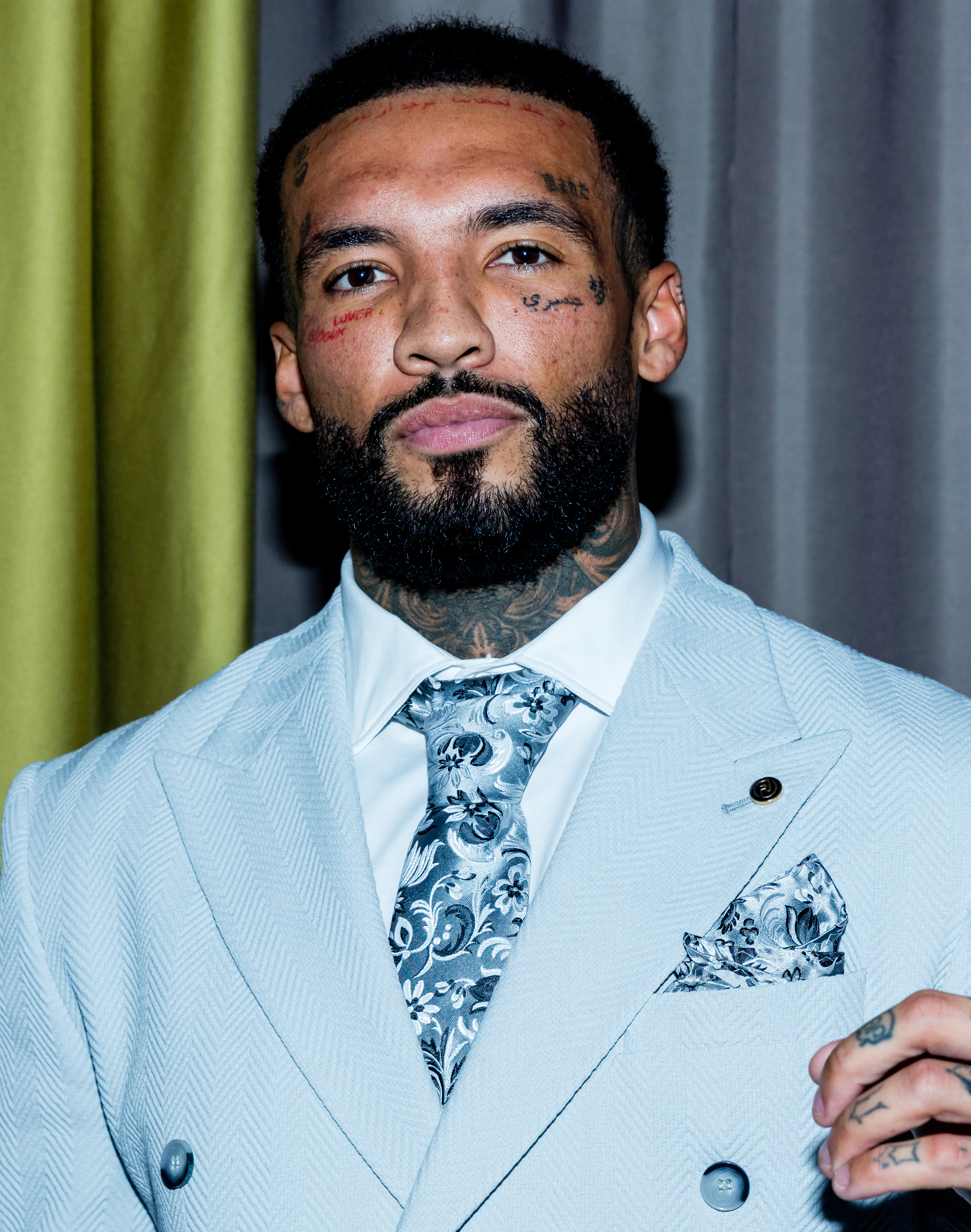
- Izzard in 2025
- Born: Callum Alexandré Izzard; 23 February 1995 (age 31); Rotherham, Yorkshire, England
- Occupation: Television personality
- Years active: 2018–present
- Television: Ibiza Weekender; Celebs Go Dating; Ex on the Beach: Peak of Love; Celebrity Ghost Trip; Celebrity Karaoke Club

Callum Alexandré Izzard (born 23 February 1995) is an English television personality. In 2018, he began appearing as a holiday rep on the ITV2 reality series Ibiza Weekender and has since appeared on several other series including Celebs Go Dating, Ex on the Beach: Peak of Love, Celebrity Ghost Trip, Celebrity Karaoke Club and The Challenge.

== Early life ==
Izzard was born on 23 February 1995 in Rotherham. He demonstrated at an early age that he had the credentials for fame after winning Disney's version of America's Got Talent singing contest in Florida in 2009 and Doncaster's Got Talent in 2010.

== Television career ==
In 2018, Izzard joined the cast of the ITV2 reality television series Ibiza Weekender as assistant head rep. He later returned for the ninth and tenth series in 2019 and 2020 respectively. In October 2018, Izzard appeared on the fifth series of the E4 dating series Celebs Go Dating.

In December 2019, Izzard was a cast member on Ex on the Beach: Peak of Love, the spin-off of the MTV series Ex on the Beach that was filmed earlier in the year, where he was joined by two of his former girlfriends, Megan Nash and Paris Decaro. During the show, he began a relationship with fellow cast member Georgia Steel, whom he later proposed to on the set of the show. They split in April 2020, after seven months together.

In October 2021, Izzard was a contestant on Celebrity Ghost Trip, the Halloween spin-off of Celebrity Coach Trip, alongside his Ibiza Weekender co-star, David Potts. They reached the final day and were runners-up of the series, losing out to Kerry Katona and her daughter Lilly.

In February 2022, Izzard appeared on an episode of Eating with My Ex, on the newly relaunched BBC Three channel, where he went on a date with ex-girlfriend Lauren Warren in an attempt to rekindle their relationship. In June 2022, he was a contestant on Celebrity Karaoke Club and was the first contestant to be eliminated.

In February 2023, Izzard competed on the reality-competition series The Challenge UK.

In October 2023, Izzard started competing on the thirty-ninth season of The Challenge titled The Challenge: Battle for a New Champion.

== Boxing career ==
On 26 November 2022, Izzard fought English reality television personality James Tinsdale and defeated him via unanimous decision.

On 20 February 2023, it was announced Izzard had signed a multi-fight deal with Misfits Boxing.

=== Izzard vs Rosé ===
On 30 August, it was announced that Izzard would face American influencer OJ Rosé on the undercard of MF & DAZN: X Series 009 at the Vertu Motors Arena in Newcastle upon Tyne, England on 23 September. OJ Rosé won the bout via third-round KO.

== Filmography ==
Year	Title	Note
2018–2020	Ibiza Weekender	Holiday rep
2018	Celebs Go Dating	Cast member
2019–2020	Ex on the Beach: Peak of Love	Cast member
2021	Celebrity Ghost Trip	Contestant; runner-up
2021	Celeb Ex in the City	Cast member; season 2
2022	Eating with My Ex	1 episode
2022	Celebrity Karaoke Club	Contestant; 12th place
2023	The Challenge UK	Contestant; 3rd place
2023	Celebrity Dinner Date	1 episode
2023	The Challenge: Battle for a New Champion	Contestant; 19th place
2024	Celebrity Ex on the beach	Cast member

== Boxing record ==
=== MF–Professional ===
1 fight	0 wins	1 loss
By knockout	0	1

No.	Result	Record	Opponent	Type	Round, time	Date	Location	Notes
1	Loss	0–1	OJ Rosé	TKO	3 (4), 2:14	23 Sep 2023	Vertu Motors Arena, Newcastle upon tyne, England	

=== Exhibition ===
1 fight	1 win	0 losses
By decision	1	0

No.	Result	Record	Opponent	Type	Round, time	Date	Location	Notes
1	Win	1–0	James Tindale	UD	4	26 Nov 2022	The Willows, London, England	
