= The Challenge UK =

Reality competition series

- Genre: Reality competition
- Created by: Mary-Ellis Bunim; Jonathan Murray
- Based on: The Challenge
- Presented by: Mark Wright
- Country of origin: United Kingdom
- Original language: English
- No. of seasons: 1
- No. of episodes: 5

Production
- Production locations: Buenos Aires, Argentina
- Running time: 60 minutes
- Production company: Bunim/Murray Productions

Original release
- Network: Channel 5
- Release: 20 February – 24 February 2023

Related
- The Challenge: World Championship

The Challenge UK is the British adaptation of the American reality competition series The Challenge. The series is a reality competition show, which premiered on 20 February 2023 on Channel 5 and is presented by Mark Wright.

== Background ==
In February 2022, a new series of international seasons of The Challenge was announced to air later in the year. The series comprises four new editions of The Challenge, which includes The Challenge: USA, The Challenge: Australia, The Challenge Argentina: El Desafío and The Challenge: UK. These local renditions were followed by a fifth series in which winners and select contestants of each series will compete again on another season titled The Challenge: World Championship, which aired on Paramount+.

In August 2022, it was reported that a British version of The Challenge was in development and that various reality television stars had signed up to appear on the series. The series features sixteen stars of sport and entertainment take on a series of athletic battles, while also trying to avoid elimination rounds and deal with the gameplay of other contestants in a bid to win £100,000. It was later confirmed that former The Only Way Is Essex cast member Mark Wright would be set to present the series.

== Format ==
The Challenge UK consists of a main challenge, a winners' selection and an elimination round.

- Daily Challenge: Players compete in the main challenge in male/female teams of two. The last-place team is automatically sent to the elimination round. The winners earn the power to select a second team to compete in the elimination against the last-place team.
- Eliminations ("The Arena"): The last-place team from the daily challenge compete in an elimination round against the team selected by the winners of the daily challenge. The winners remain in the game while the losers are eliminated.

Twists

- The Algorithm: Introduced after the first elimination, an algorithm assigns players a new partner of the opposite gender for the next game cycle. Players must be assigned a new partner they haven't been paired with, or cannot have the same partner twice in a row if they have already partnered with each eligible remaining player.

== Contestants ==
Male contestants	Original series	Finish
Tristan Phipps	Made in Chelsea 16	Winner
Nathan Henry	Geordie Shore 10	Runner-up
Callum Izzard	Ibiza Weekender 7	Third place
AJ Pritchard	Strictly Come Dancing 14	Fourth place
Ashley McKenzie	Celebrity Big Brother 10	Episode 4
Marcel Somerville	Love Island 3	Episode 3
Curtis Pritchard	Love Island 5	Episode 2
James Lock	The Only Way Is Essex 24	Episode 1

Female contestants	Original series	Finish
Kaz Crossley	Love Island 4	Winner
Zara Zoffany	The Royal World	Runner-up
Courtney Veale	Below Deck Mediterranean 6	Third place
Arabella Chi	Love Island 5	Fourth place
Ella Wise	The Only Way Is Essex 24	Episode 4
Danni Menzies	A Place in the Sun	Episode 3
Kaz Kamwi	Love Island 7	Episode 2
Aisleyne Horgan-Wallace	Big Brother 7	Episode 1

== Gameplay ==
=== Challenge games ===
- Meet Me Halfway: Each team member faces off on a beam against a same-gender opponent from another team and attempts to push their opponent into the water below as fast as possible. The four teams that win the most matchups advance to the final round and repeat this process. The team from the final round with the most matchup wins, in the fastest time in the case of a tie, wins. The team that loses both their matchups in the fastest time is automatically sent to the Arena.
  - Winners: Ashley & Kaz C.
- Peaking Blinders: Teams race down a path to a pattern covered by blinds. There, one team member must balance one-footed on a narrow pole to open the blinds and reveal the pattern for their partner to memorise. After the team member balancing falls off, teams must return to their board at the start and attempt to replicate their pattern, repeating this process until they correctly recreate the entire pattern. The first team to finish wins while the last team to finish is automatically sent to the Arena.
  - Winners: Ella & Nathan
- Getting Tyred: Teams race to an abandoned town where they can collect tyres or tokens and bring them to their station to earn points. Tokens are worth 1 point while tyres are worth 5, 10, 15 or 20 points. However, teams must complete various tasks to obtain tyres; the more points a tyre is worth, the harder the task is. Teams continue this process for two hours. The team with the most points at the end of two hours wins while the team fewest points is automatically sent to the Arena.
  - Winners: Arabella & Ashley
- Frozen Senseless: One team member must feel through a covered box at one end of a course for three cubes with shapes on each face. They must then meet their partner describe the pattern to them so they can assemble the cubes using puzzle pieces at the other end of the course. However, teams must immerse themselves in an ice bath at the middle of the course while communicating the descriptions. The first team to correctly assemble their cubes wins while the last team is automatically sent to the Arena.
  - Winners: AJ & Kaz C.

=== Arena games ===
- Knot So Fast: Teams have 20 minutes to create as many knots as they can using a 50-metre rope within a pyramid structure. After those 20 minutes are up, teams switch positions and must untie their opponent's knots. The first team to untie their opponent's knots and drag the rope across a marked line wins.
  - Played by: Aisleyne & James vs. Courtney & Curtis
- Pato Brawl: Played in male and female rounds. Each round, team members of the designated gender begin at the center of the Arena with both hands on a pato ball. The first player to wrestle the ball out of their opponent's hands two out of three times wins the round for their team. The first team to win two rounds wins.
  - Played by: AJ & Arabella vs. Curtis & Kaz K.
- Ball and Chain: Teams open six panels at the top of a tall wall to reveal six trivia questions. They must search among several 15-kilogram medicine balls wrapped in chains for six with the answers on them, and hang them on hooks below their respective question. The first team to correctly answer all six questions wins.
  - Played by: AJ & Courtney vs. Danni & Marcel
- Balls In: Played in male and female rounds. Each round, team members of the designated gender play both offense and defense. The offense player has three attempts to deposit a ball into a goal at the center of a ring while the defense player attempts to stop them by blocking them and knocking the ball out of bounds. Players then switch roles and repeat the process. The player who scores the most goals wins the round for their team. The first team to win two rounds wins.
  - Played by: Arabella & Nathan vs. Ashley & Ella

=== Final Challenge ===
The final eight contestants competed in the Final Challenge, where they completed timed checkpoints in male-female pairs. For the first two checkpoints, players competed in teams determined by the Algorithm at the end of the "Balls In" elimination; the last team to complete the first two checkpoints were eliminated. Afterwards, the remaining six players completed the final two checkpoints — in which the Algorithm selected new teams for each checkpoint.

At the end of the Final Challenge, each individual's time from the four checkpoints were accumulated to determine the male and female winners of UK, who receive £50,000 each.

- Checkpoint #1: Teams must collectively cycle 100 km on a stationary bike before proceeding to the next checkpoint.
- Checkpoint #2: Teams swim through a swamp to collect bags of puzzle pieces at two platforms. After returning the puzzle pieces to their station, teams must then run down a path to view and memorize an answer key before recreating the key at their station using the puzzle pieces. Once complete, teams then proceed to the next Algorithm — the last team to reach the Algorithm is eliminated from the Final Challenge.
  - Eliminated: AJ & Arabella (4th place)
- Checkpoint #3: Teams must untangle a chain, pull a sled across a field and arrange four cubes on the sled so each side shows four unique symbols.
- Checkpoint #4: Teams must transfer tyres labelled with the names of eliminated contestants and elimination games, including several decoy names, down a track. There, they must arrange the tyres on a pole to show the correct order the contestants were eliminated and the elimination they lost in. Once complete, teams must push a car across a field before proceeding to the finish line where the results are announced.

Final results

- Male
  - Winner: Tristan (5 hours, 15 minutes, 55 seconds)
  - Runner-up: Nathan (6 hours, 17 minutes, 52 seconds)
  - Third place: Callum (6 hours, 29 minutes, 9 seconds)
- Female
  - Winner: Kaz C. (5 hours, 55 minutes, 18 seconds)
  - Runner-up: Zara (5 hours, 56 minutes, 17 seconds)
  - Third place: Courtney (6 hours, 11 minutes, 21 seconds)

== Game summary ==
Episode		Winners	Arena contestants		Arena game	Arena outcome	
#	Challenge	Winners	Last place	Winners' pick	Arena game	Winners	Eliminated
1	Meet Me Halfway	Ashley & Kaz C.	Aisleyne & James	Courtney & Curtis	Knot So Fast	Courtney & Curtis	Aisleyne & James
2	Peaking Blinders	Ella & Nathan	Curtis & Kaz K.	AJ & Arabella	Pato Brawl	AJ & Arabella	Curtis & Kaz K.
3	Getting Tyred	Arabella & Ashley	Danni & Marcel	AJ & Courtney	Ball and Chain	AJ & Courtney	Danni & Marcel
4	Frozen Senseless	AJ & Kaz C.	Ashley & Ella	Arabella & Nathan	Balls In	Arabella & Nathan	Ashley & Ella
5	Final Challenge	Kaz C.	2nd: Zara; 3rd: Courtney; 4th: Arabella				
5	Final Challenge	Tristan	2nd: Nathan; 3rd: Callum; 4th: AJ				

=== Episode progress ===
Contestants	Episodes				
Contestants	1	2	3	4	Finale
Kaz C.	WIN	SAFE	SAFE	WIN	WINNER
Tristan	SAFE	SAFE	SAFE	SAFE	WINNER
Nathan	SAFE	WIN	SAFE	ELIM	SECOND
Zara	SAFE	SAFE	SAFE	SAFE	SECOND
Callum	SAFE	SAFE	SAFE	SAFE	THIRD
Courtney	ELIM	SAFE	ELIM	SAFE	THIRD
AJ	SAFE	ELIM	ELIM	WIN	FOURTH
Arabella	SAFE	ELIM	WIN	ELIM	FOURTH
Ashley	WIN	SAFE	WIN	OUT	
Ella	SAFE	WIN	SAFE	OUT	
Danni	SAFE	SAFE	OUT		
Marcel	SAFE	SAFE	OUT		
Curtis	ELIM	OUT			
Kaz K.	SAFE	OUT			
Aisleyne	OUT				
James	OUT				

Competition key
The contestant won the Final Challenge
The contestant did not win the Final Challenge
The contestant was eliminated during the Final Challenge
The contestant won the daily challenge
The contestant was not selected for the Arena
The contestant won the elimination in the Arena
The contestant lost in the Arena and was eliminated

== Team progress ==
For the first episode, players chose their own teams prior to the "Meet Me Halfway" challenge. From episode two, teams were decided by the Algorithm.

Contestants	Episodes						
Contestants	1	2	3	4	Finale		
Kaz C.	Ashley	Marcel	Callum	AJ	Tristan	Callum	Nathan
Tristan	Arabella	Courtney	Ella	Zara	Kaz C.	Courtney	Zara
Nathan	Danni	Ella	Zara	Arabella	Courtney	Zara	Kaz C.
Zara	AJ	Ashley	Nathan	Tristan	Callum	Nathan	Tristan
Callum	Kaz K.	Danni	Kaz C.	Courtney	Zara	Kaz C.	Courtney
Courtney	Curtis	Tristan	AJ	Callum	Nathan	Tristan	Callum
AJ	Zara	Arabella	Courtney	Kaz C.	Arabella		
Arabella	Tristan	AJ	Ashley	Nathan	AJ		
Ashley	Kaz C.	Zara	Arabella	Ella			
Ella	Marcel	Nathan	Tristan	Ashley			
Danni	Nathan	Callum	Marcel				
Marcel	Ella	Kaz C.	Danni				
Curtis	Courtney	Kaz K.					
Kaz K.	Callum	Curtis					
Aisleyne	James						
James	Aisleyne						

== Episodes ==
No.	Title	Original release date
1	"Welcome to The Challenge"	20 February 2023
2	"Work Smarter Not Harder"	21 February 2023
3	"The Long Kiss, Goodnight"	22 February 2023
4	"An Eye for an Eye"	23 February 2023
5	"The End of The Challenge as we Know It"	24 February 2023
