= Megan Barton-Hanson =

British television personality and model (born 1994)

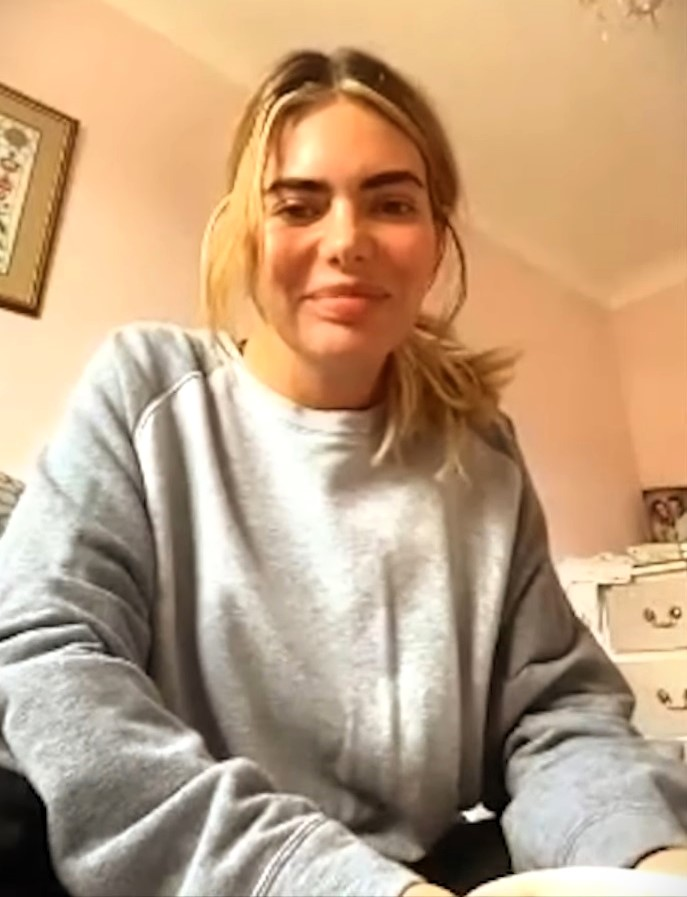
- Barton-Hanson in 2020
- Born: Megan Leah Barton-Hanson; 6 March 1994 (age 32); Southend-on-Sea, Essex, England
- Occupations: Television personality; model
- Years active: 2018–present
- Website: meganbarton-hanson.com

Megan Leah Barton-Hanson (born 6 March 1994) is a British reality TV star, model, and social media personality. Born in Southend-on-Sea in Essex, she first attracted attention after appearing on the fourth series of Love Island in 2018 with Wes Nelson, with whom she placed joint-fourth, and whom she dated until January 2019.

In 2023, Barton-Hanson spent a short period on Love Island Games, on which she and Kyra Green formed the franchise's second same-sex pairing. Vice had described her in December 2020 as one of the "very few openly bisexual women in mainstream reality TV". In March 2020, Barton-Hanson reactivated her OnlyFans account, which she uses to upload intimate photographs and collaborations with photographers and makeup artists. For a tip, she also replies to subscribers. She admits that this costs her work opportunities, however her account was the ninth highest-earning account on the platform that year.

== Life and career ==
=== Early life ===
Megan Leah Barton-Hanson was born on 6 March 1994 in Southend-on-Sea in Essex and has a brother. Her father is an insurance broker. In secondary school, she suffered from bullying for her appearance and underwent otoplasty in an attempt to stem the abuse, only for her to be bullied for that instead. She also suffered from slut-shaming from the age of sixteen, first by prospective dates, and then by her friends after admitting to having previously masturbated. Around this time, she underwent six sessions of therapy on the National Health Service.

After leaving school, she trained as a personal assistant before working for a fashion designer and as a social media manager. Aged nineteen, she underwent rhinoplasty, followed by breast augmentation and lip and cheek fillers, and later had veneers installed. She also spent about a year as a lap dancer, as well as a period as a webcam model, and had an OnlyFans account around this time. In January 2018, having suffered depression since she was thirteen and adopted an internet persona and used retail therapy to make herself feel better, she began suffering from suicidal ideation, and asked her mother for permission to end her life. She later underwent therapy and has credited it with teaching her coping mechanisms that worked.

=== Love Island ===
"Straight after the show, every question I was asked was: "Are you embarrassed about having sex on TV?" Why should I be embarrassed? The boys never got asked that question. I know that for a fact because I was always next to Wes. He wasn't asked that once."

— Barton-Hanson talking to Cosmopolitan in January 2023

On 10 June 2018, after deleting her OnlyFans account at the producers' behest, Barton-Hanson appeared on the fourth series of Love Island alongside Eyal Booker, Wes Nelson, Alex Miller, Dean Overson, and 33 other contestants. She applied for the show thinking it would make her famous and that the money she would earn on the program would make her happy. In a March 2024 interview with Sarah-Jane Honeywell, Barton-Hanson stated that she was scouted for Olivia Attwood's series (the previous year) but declined as she wanted to appear from the start. Over the 50 days Barton-Hanson was on Love Island, she entered into relationships with Booker and Nelson, sleeping with both, coupled up with Miller, slept in his bed, and kissed Overson, before coupling back up with Nelson, with whom she finished in joint-fourth place.

The speed at which she coupled up with Nelson after dumping Booker and the fact that Nelson was coupled up with Laura Anderson at the time earned her the sobriquet "Muggy Megan", a term derived from the previous series' Muggy Mike. The online store Getting Personal responded by selling "Muggy Megan" mugs. Additionally, whilst on the programme, pre-surgery pictures of Barton-Hanson from when she was a teenager resurfaced, causing her to experience online abuse. Furthermore, negative coverage of her in the press prompted an ITV press officer to take her into a room after she left to describe every negative story that had come out about her. However, in January 2022, Closer rated her subsequent refusal to be shamed as one of five times she had been a "sex positive icon".

Barton-Hanson and Nelson remained together after the series ended, with Barton-Hanson moving into Nelson's flat and both later moving into a flat in Camden. In January 2019, shortly after Nelson's first live show on that year's series of Dancing on Ice, the pair announced that they had broken up and would be co-parenting their hamster, citing differences in priorities as the reason for their split. A flare-up of depression caused by the pressures of Love Island fame, a burglary, and her break-up with Nelson prompted Barton-Hanson to undergo cognitive behavioural therapy.

Barton-Hanson returned to the Love Island world in November 2023 for day two of Love Island Games. While on the programme, she formed the franchise's second same-sex pairing with Kyra Green of Love Island USA 1, the first being Katie Salmon and Sophie Gradon in 2016. On 12 November, the show's narrator Iain Stirling announced that Barton-Hanson had left the programme on medical grounds. She declined to enter the following year's Love Island: All Stars, with her fellow UK stars, stating that the series's men were not attractive enough.

=== Later ventures ===
In May 2019, she stripped naked for The All New Monty: Who Bares Wins. She came out as bisexual the month after, having delayed doing so due to having worked in the sex industry and to avoid feeding into the LGBT stereotype of bisexual promiscuity. In July 2019, she appeared on Joel Dommett's ITV2 game show Hey Tracey!; while on the programme, she was asked out by Stephen Bear, whom she declined. She then appeared on that year's series of Celebs Go Dating, later dating that series's Demi Sims, the sister of fellow The Only Way Is Essex co-star Chloe Sims. The pair later appeared on Eating With My Ex, a BBC Three show where ex-partners debrief their relationships, and were described in December 2020 by Vice as two of the "very few openly bisexual women in mainstream reality TV" alongside Chloe Ferry and the cast of The Bi Life. Barton-Hanson then appeared in the music video for "Time to Talk" by Chelcee Grimes, whom she later also dated.

"I enjoy getting glammed up, my hair and makeup gets done. I get to create the concept myself. It's not this seedy, ropey world that the sex industry used to be. Even Love Island, we had to parade around in bikinis the whole time, no-one has an issue with that. As soon as I take the power into my own hands and set a fee to do that: 'Oh my God, she's such a slut.' Not really, I'm smart because I'm doing what everyone else is doing except I'm getting paid on top."

— Barton-Hanson on Kathy Burke: Money Talks

In March 2020, after experiencing boredom during lockdown, she revived her OnlyFans account, charging $24.99 per month. She uses her account to upload intimate photographs and collaborations with photographers and makeup artists. For a tip, she also replies to subscribers. By November 2020, she had made No. 9 on the OnlyFans Rich List, a ranking of highest-rating earners on the platform, and later used the proceeds to buy and furnish a three-bedroom house in London. Explaining herself on Kathy Burke: Money Talks in July 2021, she stated that she made between £20,000 and £70,000 each month and had between two and three thousand followers on the platform. However, in 2023, she stated that her presence on the platform had caused her to lose out on "countless jobs" as companies and agencies were disinclined to work with her.

In mid-November 2020, she launched a podcast, You Come First, where she discussed aspects of her life such as stripping, bisexuality, and OnlyFans. One episode in December 2020 featured Sims, and Barton-Hanson stated during the episode that she had received abuse for restarting her OnlyFans account. She later dated James Lock, with whom she later broke up, appeared on the second series of Celebrity Ex on the Beach with in 2022, and broke up with again. In May 2023, she appeared on The Big Celebrity Detox but left after one episode. In December 2024, the BBC reported that Barton-Hanson had divulged on an episode of the We Need to Talk podcast presented by Paul C. Brunson that she had been stealthed up to six times, one of which had led to her having an abortion.

== Social media ==
Barton-Hanson maintains an Instagram account, which as of December 2020 had 1,700,000 followers, most of whom were women. She uses her account to dispense advice on sexual stimulation, worthwhile sex toy purchases, coming out, how to approach women, and repairing troubled relationships. In September 2023, she used an Instagram story to note that she was suffering symptoms of pelvic inflammatory disease. In December 2020, Emma Garland of Vice wrote that she had "carve[d] out her own lane somewhere between an influencer, a celebrity and a Cock Destroyer". A spike of abuse while she was on Love Island season 4 led her delegate to disable comments due to the death threats and slut-shaming she was receiving. In October 2022, her account was suspended for sixteen hours for violating the site's terms of service.
