= Geordie Shore series 10 =

Geordie Shore
- Series 10
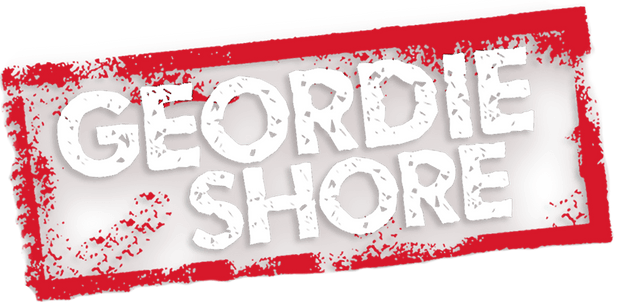
- No. of episodes: 8

Release
- Original network: MTV
- Original release: 7 April – 26 May 2015

Series chronology
- ← Previous; Series 9 Next → Series 11

The tenth series of Geordie Shore, a British television programme based in Newcastle upon Tyne was confirmed on 1 November 2014, and began airing on 7 April 2015. This will be the first series not to include original cast member Vicky Pattison after she departed at the end of the previous series. Ahead of the series it was confirmed that new cast members Chloe Ferry and Nathan Henry had joined the show.

== Cast ==
- Aaron Chalmers
- Charlotte-Letitia Crosby
- Chloe Ferry
- Gary Beadle
- Holly Hagan
- James Tindale
- Kyle Christie
- Marnie Simpson
- Nathan Henry
- Scott Timlin

=== Duration of cast ===
Cast members
Cast members	1	2	3	4	5	6	7	8
Aaron								
Charlotte								
Chloe								
Gaz								
Holly								
James								
Kyle								
Marnie								
Nathan								
Scott								

= Cast member is featured in this episode.
= Cast member arrives in the house.
= Cast member voluntarily leaves the house.
= Cast member leaves and returns to the house in the same episode.
= Cast member returns to the house.
= Cast member leaves the series.
= Cast member does not feature in this episode.
= Cast member is not officially a cast member in this episode.

== Episodes ==
No. overall	No. in season	Title	Original release date	Viewers (millions)
69	1	"Episode 1"	7 April 2015	0.839
Buzzin'! Our favourite party animals are back! When Charlotte finds out about a pact between Gary and Aaron she hatches a plan - but will she end up with egg on her face? Meanwhile James is having doubts about his future in the house.
70	2	"Episode 2"	14 April 2015	0.861
It's all change in the house as James makes a shock announcement and two new housemates come through the door. But the newbies' first night out is ruined when a huge fight breaks out between Charlotte, Marnie and Holly.
71	3	"Episode 3"	21 April 2015	0.946
It's the Newbies first morning in the house but with Holly, Kyle and Charlotte gone how will the family get back together? Holly opens her heart to Kyle but does he feel the same? And a shock revelation from Gary leaves Charlotte heartbroken.
72	4	"Episode 4"	28 April 2015	0.858
It's the day that Charlotte's been dreading, Gary introdices his new girlfriend to the family but will Psycho Charlotte put in an appearance? Meanwhile Marnie and Aaron get very flirty!
73	5	"Episode 5"	5 May 2015	0.845
Anna tells the Geordies she's got a job for them in another Country they're all buzzing! That is until they turn up to a Caravan site in Wales Marnie decides to give Aaron some home truths
74	6	"Episode 6"	12 May 2015	0.857
Hamburg is about to feel the full force of Tash on Tours, but are they ready for Marnie kicking off at Aaron?
75	7	"Episode 7"	19 May 2015	1.004
Newbie Chloe meets 'psycho Charlotte' after a night out goes sour, and Holly's return to the house is ruined when she's confronted with the true reason Kyle doesn't want to make their relationship official ... is it all over for them?!
76	8	"Episode 8"	26 May 2015	0.986
Scotty T is back to 'jump start' the final episode with a dare-devil activity for his Geordie crew. Meanwhile, tensions run high as Holly waits to hear Kyle's decision.

== Ratings ==
Episode	Date	Official MTV rating	MTV weekly rank	Official MTV+1 rating	Total MTV viewers
Episode 1	7 April 2015	750,000	1	89,000	839,000
Episode 2	14 April 2015	783,000	1	78,000	861,000
Episode 3	21 April 2015	880,000	1	66,000	946,000
Episode 4	28 April 2015	813,000	1	45,000	858,000
Episode 5	5 May 2015	779,000	1	66,000	845,000
Episode 6	12 May 2015	773,000	1	84,000	857,000
Episode 7	19 May 2015	907,000	1	97,000	1,004,000
Episode 8	26 May 2015	893,000	1	93,000	986,000
