= James Lock (TV personality) =

English television personality (born 1986)

- Born: James Stephen Lock; 6 December 1986 (age 39); Tower Hamlets, London, England
- Occupation: Television personality
- Television: The Only Way Is Essex; Celebs Go Dating; Celebrity Ex on the Beach

James Stephen Lock (born 6 December 1986) is an English television personality, who is best known for being a cast member on the ITVBe reality series The Only Way Is Essex since 2013.

== Career ==
In 2013, Lock joined the cast of The Only Way Is Essex for its eighth series and has been a member of the cast ever since.

In 2020, Lock appeared on the eighth series of Celebs Go Dating.

In 2022, Lock was a cast member on the second series of Celebrity Ex on the Beach. He also appeared on Celebrity Dinner Date and an episode of the BBC Three show Eating with My Ex. He also appeared on an episode of CelebAbility.

In 2023, Lock was eliminated first as a contestant on the first series The Challenge UK, the British version of MTV's reality-competition series The Challenge. Later the same year, he competed on the thirty-ninth of the main series, titled The Challenge: Battle for a New Champion. In November 2023, Lock joined OnlyFans.

== Filmography ==
Year	Title	Notes
2013–2023	The Only Way Is Essex	Main cast (series 8–30)
2020	Celebs Go Dating	Main cast (series 8)
2022, 2024	Celebrity Ex on the Beach	Main cast (series 2), (series 3)
2022	Celebrity Dinner Date	
2023	The Challenge UK	Contestant (1st eliminated)
2023–24	The Challenge: Battle for a New Champion	Contestant (13th eliminated)
