= Celebrity Ex on the Beach =

British reality television series

- Genre: Reality
- Created by: MTV UK
- Country of origin: United Kingdom
- Original language: English
- No. of series: 4
- No. of episodes: 47 (list of episodes)

Production
- Production company: Whizz Kid Entertainment (eOne)

Original release
- Network: MTV UK
- Release: 21 January 2020 – 13 May 2024
- Network: Paramount+
- Release: 19 March 2024 – present

Related
- Ex on the Beach

Celebrity Ex on the Beach is a British reality television series that is broadcast on MTV UK. The series was first announced in December 2019, and premiered on 21 January 2020. The series is narrated by Andrew Maxwell. Celebrity Ex on the Beach follows the format of celebrity cast members staying abroad and beginning relationships, which are typically interrupted by their exes arriving at various points throughout the series.

== Series overview ==
| Series | Cast | Location | Episodes | Originally released | | Average viewers (millions) |
| Series | Cast | Location | Episodes | First released | Last released | Average viewers (millions) |
|---|---|---|---|---|---|---|
| 1 | 23 | Marbella, Spain | 15 | 21 January 2020 | 28 April 2020 | 327,000 |
| 2 | 22 | Gran Canaria | 12 | 15 February 2022 | 3 May 2022 | - |
| 3 | 20 | Gran Canaria | 10 | 19 March 2024 | 13 May 2024 | - |
| 4 | 19 | Tenerife | 10 | 31 March 2026 | 2 June 2026 | TBA |

== Episodes ==
=== Series 1 (2020) ===
The first series of Celebrity Ex on the Beach began airing on 21 January 2020 and concluded on 28 April 2020. The cast includes Olympic athlete Ashley McKenzie, television personality Calum Best, The Only Way Is Essex star Joey Essex, and Love Island stars Michael Griffiths and Georgia Harrison, The Valleys star Lateysha Grace, playboy model Lorena Medina and Mob Wives star Marissa Jade.

=== Series 2 (2022) ===
The second series of Celebrity Ex on the Beach began airing 15 February 2022. The cast includes RuPaul's Drag Race UK queen A'Whora, The Only Way Is Essex cast member James "Lockie" Lock, star of Too Hot To Handle Kori Sampson, Love Island UK islanders Kaz Crossley, Megan Barton-Hanson and Michael Boateng, Married at First Sight Australia cast member KC Osborne, Geordie Shore's Nathan Henry and Love Island Sweden islander Sofie Karlstad. This series was filmed in Gran Canaria.

=== Series 3 (2024) ===
The third series of Celebrity Ex on the Beach began airing on 19 March 2024. The cast includes rapper Ivorian Doll, Love Island UK stars Finley Tapp and Joe Garratt, The Only Way Is Essex cast member Yazmin Oukhellou, FBoy Island's Jarred Evans, Married At First Sight Australia's Jessika Power, Too Hot To Handle stars Chloe Veitch and James Pendergrass and playboy model Ashley Resch.

=== Series 4 (2026) ===
The fourth series of Celebrity Ex on the Beach is set to begin airing on 31 March 2026. The cast includes Married at First Sight star Amy Kenyon, professional boxer and Too Hot to Handle star Chase DeMoor, The Only Way Is Essex cast member Dani Imbert, Love Is Blind: UK star Freddie Powell, former Coronation Street actress Helen Flanagan, Too Hot to Handle star Izzy Fairthorne, Jedward singer and The X Factor contestant John Grimes and Love Island contestant and footballer Toby Aromolaran.
