= Geordie Shore: The Reunion Series =

- Series 23
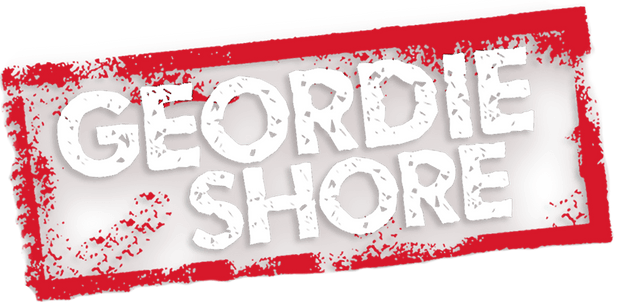
- No. of episodes: 10

Release
- Original network: MTV
- Original release: 20 September – 22 November 2022

Season chronology
- ← Previous; Series 22 Next → Series 24

The twenty-third series of Geordie Shore, a British television programme based in Newcastle upon Tyne was confirmed on 15 February 2022, when Paramount+ introduced their new lineup of unscripted series and renewals for MTV Entertainment Studios, including the show's new spin-off, although they were scheduled to start in late 2020 and 2021 but have been postponed several times due to UK COVID-19 restrictions. Filming locations include a trip to the Algarve in Portugal, Ibiza and Newcastle upon Tyne. The first trailer for the season was released in late August 2022 and premiered later that year on September 20. This was the final series to feature Marty McKenna after he was suspended from MTV. This series appears as "Geordie Shore: The Reunion Series" and not as a spin off of the show. This series brings together the cast members to celebrate Geordie Shore's 10th anniversary.

== Cast ==
MTV reunited original cast members Charlotte Crosby, Holly Hagan, Sophie Kasaei, James Tindale, and Jay Gardner nearly 11 years after filming the first series.

This ten year reunion special also featured veterans Ricci Guarnaccio, Marnie Simpson, Kyle Christie and Aaron Chalmers, also Zahida Allen and Chantelle Connelly, making their return, while Scott Timlin and original cast member Greg Lake made a brief return.

Former cast members Faith Mullen, Tahlia Chung, Natalie Phillips anda Stephanie Snowdon made appearances during the series, joining Devon Nathaniel Reid, Jade Affleck, Harrison Campbell, Ruby Torre, Jay Baker and Roxy Johnson from Geordie Shore: Hot Single Summer. It also recurringly features Casey Johnson and Jacob Blyth, the husbands of Marnie and Holly from Geordie Shore OGs.

=== Duration of cast ===
Cast members
Cast members	1	2	3	4	5	6	7	8	9	10
Aaron										
Abbie										
Amelia										
Ant										
Bethan										
Chantelle										
Charlotte										
Chloe										
Greg										
Holly										
James										
Jay G										
Kyle										
Louis										
Marty										
Marnie										
Nathan										
Ricci										
Scott										
Sophie										
Zahida										
Special Guest
Devon										
Faith										
Harrison										
Jade										
Jay B										
Nat										
Roxy										
Ruby										
Stephanie										
Tahlia										

= Cast member is featured in this episode
= Cast member leaves the series
= Cast member returns to the series
= Cast member does not feature in this episode
= Cast member features in this episode despite not being an official cast member at the time
= Cast member is not officially a cast member in this episode

== Episodes ==
No. overall	No. in season	Title	Original release date
196	1	"Let's Get Together!"	20 September 2022
To celebrate over 10 years of Geordie Shore, Charlotte, Holly and Sophie hold a baby shower for Marnie, where they plan a reunion party. But is arranging a party really a good idea?.
197	2	"The Reunion Begins"	27 September 2022
Charlotte, Holly, Sophie and Marnie's plan of a big Geordie Reunion comes together! Cast past and present descend on the Toon for the big night but, does everyone turn up?.
198	3	"The Reunion Continues"	4 October 2022
The Geordie Shore Reunion continues with more shock arrivals bouncing through the door. Some Geordies will meet for the first time in years, some will make up, some will be able to move on and some will never speak again.
199	4	"The Geordies Invade Portugal!"	11 October 2022
The Reunion and Chloe and Bethan's argument reaches a climactic end. The gang land in Portugal for a family holiday! What blasts from the past are jumping on the next flight to the Algarve?.
200	5	"Trouble On The Horizon!"	18 October 2022
Chloe Ferrys shock arrival causes a massive ripple affect across the whole group! Nathan tries to smooth over tensions by taking the girls off to a spiritual retreat.
201	6	"Holly's Hen Do"	25 October 2022
Louis' arrival causes drama for the Geordies. Charlotte and Sophie throw Holly a surprise Hen Do on a boat! Someone else unexpectedly turns up at the villa, which will cause shockwaves throughout the Algarve!.
202	7	"The Answer to the Big Question"	1 November 2022
As the trip to the Algarve comes to an end. Louis action’s continue to cause drama amongst the Geordie’s and Holly finally gets some answers to the question everyone has been wondering!.
203	8	"The Pitter Patter Of Wedding Bells!"	8 November 2022
Marnie and Casey welcome a new arrival to their family! Elsewhere, another monumental day looms and the Geordies are in Ibiza gearing up for Holly's wedding day!.
204	9	"Back on the Toon"	15 November 2022
The Geordies are back in Newcastle for a night on the Toon! Who will show up and after all the recent drama will it be a Night to remember for all the right or wrong reasons?
205	10	"The Reunion Finale"	22 November 2022
It's time for one final house party at the Geordie Shore House to bring the Reunion to a close. As the group prepare to say goodbye, will it all be on good terms or is there still issues from the past that need to be faced?
