= Geordie Shore series 25 =

English television programme

Geordie Shore
- Series 25
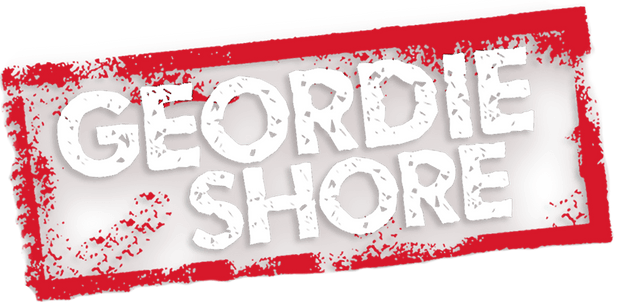
- No. of episodes: 10

Release
- Original network: MTV; Paramount+
- Original release: 7 January – 4 March 2025

Series chronology
- ← Previous; Series 24 Next → Series 26

The twenty-fifth series of Geordie Shore, an English television programme based in Newcastle upon Tyne was confirmed in May 2024, and began airing on 7 January 2025. The cast gathers at a resort on the island of Ko Samui, although some scenes also include Bangkok. Charlotte Crosby did not return after the previous season, while Scott Timlin returns for a third time on the show. In March 2025, Timlin dismissal was announced for the second time after 2018.

== Cast ==
Unlike the previous two seasons, only the main cast reunited for a vacation at a resort in Thailand for Kyle's bachelor party, while his romantic partners joined them later. It includes original cast members Holly Hagan, Sophie Kasaei, James Tindale and Jay Gardner, and veterans Ricci Guarnaccio, Scott Timlin, Marnie Simpson, Kyle Christie, Chantelle Connelly, Chloe Ferry, Nathan Henry and Abbie Holborn. Also recurring are TOWIE star Jordan Brook, Leah Bowley, Casey Johnson and Vicky Turner, the romantic partners of Sophie, James, Marnie and Kyle respectively.

=== Duration of cast ===
Cast members	1	2	3	4	5	6	7	8	9	10
Abbie										
Chantelle										
Chloe										
Holly										
James										
Jay										
Kyle										
Marnie										
Nathan										
Ricci										
Scott										
Sophie										

= Cast member is featured in this episode
= Cast member leaves the series
= Cast member returns to the series
= Cast member voluntarily leaves the house
= Cast member returns to the house
= Cast member leaves and returns to the house in the same episode
= Cast member does not feature in this episode

== Episodes ==
No. overall	No. in season	Title	Original release date
216	1	"Geordie Shore, Thai-Aye!"	7 January 2025
217	2	"Sun, Sea & Scotty-T!"	7 January 2025
218	3	"Trouble in Paradise!"	14 January 2025
219	4	"It's a Family Affair"	21 January 2025
220	5	"Full Moon Carnage"	28 January 2025
221	6	"A Decent Proposal"	4 February 2025
222	7	"Will She, Won't She?"	11 February 2025
223	8	"Ko Samui Kick Off"	18 February 2025
224	9	"What Did You Call Me?!"	25 February 2025
225	10	"Never Say Never!"	4 March 2025
