= Geordie Shore series 26 =

English television programme

Geordie Shore
- Series 26
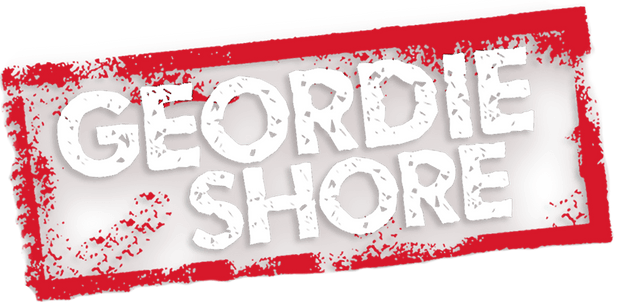
- No. of episodes: 10

Release
- Original network: Paramount+
- Original release: 13 January – 17 March 2026

Season chronology
- ← Previous; Series 25 Next → Series 27

The twenty-sixth series of Geordie Shore, an English television programme based in Newcastle upon Tyne was announced in December 2025, and began airing on 13 January 2026. The cast gathers at a resort in Lisbon and in the Alentejo region of Portugal for their third trip to the country. The final episode was filmed in various cities, including Bedfordshire and Newcastle, while Kyle's wedding took place in Rome, Italy. Before filming began, Scott Timlin's departure was confirmed for the fourth time. This season marks the return of Gaz Beadle and Aaron Chalmers.

This was the last season in which James Tindale, an original cast member, participated, as well as Chloe Ferry, Chantelle Connelly, and Marnie Simpson.

== Cast ==
Before traveling to Portugal, some cast members met up in different cities in the UK. Afterward, they traveled to a resort in Lisbon for Kyle's wedding and Chloe's 30th birthday party. The cast includes original cast members Gaz Beadle, Holly Hagan, Sophie Kasaei, James Tindale, and Jay Gardner, as well as veterans Ricci Guarnaccio, Marnie Simpson, Aaron Chalmers, Kyle Christie, Chantelle Connelly, Chloe Ferry, Nathan Henry, and Abbie Holborn. Also appearing in recurring roles are TOWIE star Jordan Brook, Leah Bowley and Vicky Turner, who are Sophie, James and Kyle's partners, respectively.

=== Duration of cast ===
Cast members	1	2	3	4	5	6	7	8	9	10
Aaron										
Abbie										
Chantelle										
Chloe										
Gaz										
Holly										
James										
Jay										
Kyle										
Marnie										
Nathan										
Ricci										
Sophie										

= Cast member is featured in this episode
= Cast member leaves the series
= Cast member returns to the series
= Cast member voluntarily leaves the house
= Cast member returns to the house
= Cast member leaves and returns to the house in the same episode
= Cast member features in this episode, but is outside of the house.
= Cast member does not feature in this episode
= Cast member is not officially a cast member in this episode

== Episodes ==
No. overall	No. in season	Title	Original release date
226	1	"Lisbon Baby!"	13 January 2026
227	2	"Geordie Tour Why Aye"	20 January 2026
228	3	"Did Someone Order Gary Beadle?"	27 January 2026
229	4	"Beadle's Back!"	3 February 2026
230	5	"Chloes Dirty Thirtieth"	10 February 2026
231	6	"Spill the Tea!"	17 February 2026
232	7	"Back to Nature!"	24 February 2026
233	8	"Gary The Second Coming"	3 March 2026
234	9	"Peace At Last!"	10 March 2026
235	10	"Births, Brides and Bye-byes!"	17 March 2026
