= Geordie Shore: Hot Single Summer =

- Series 22
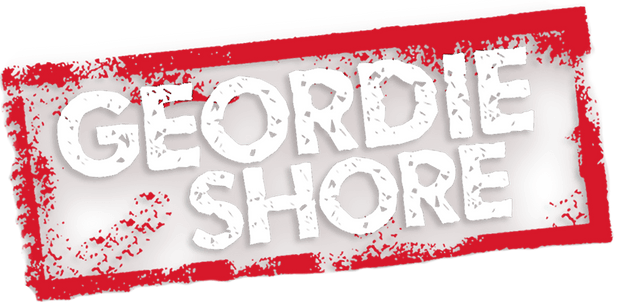
- No. of episodes: 10

Release
- Original network: MTV
- Original release: 5 October – 7 December 2021

Season chronology
- ← Previous; Series 21 Next → Series 23

The twenty-second series of Geordie Shore, a British television show based in Newcastle upon Tyne, began airing on 5 October 2021. The announcement of this series replaced the show's tenth anniversary reunion series that was due to be set in Colombia, but was delayed in November 2020, and again in January 2021, before being postponed entirely due to travel restrictions thanks to the COVID-19 pandemic and continued UK restrictions. Before filming began in June 2021, the cast had to be quarantined for ten days. This series features a dating show format, where the current cast were joined by a number of new single cast members and sent on dates with them, with an added twist of eliminations for those who fail to make romantic connections. It also includes the return of Marty McKenna, who made his last appearance in the fifteenth series.

== Cast ==
- Chloe Ferry
- Nathan Henry
- Abbie Holborn
- Anthony Kennedy
- Bethan Kershaw
- Amelia Lily
- Marty McKenna
- Louis Shaw
- James Tindale

=== Dates ===
- Aaron Fare
- Anya Brokman
- Brandon Henderson
- Charlie Wheeler
- Chloe Adams
- Darcy Philip
- Devon Nathaniel Reid
- Harrison Campbell
- India-Jane Wilkinson
- Jack Roberts
- Jade Affleck
- Jay Baker
- Josh Mather
- Kelsey Wright
- Kyle Tyler Lunn
- Molly Godfrey
- Nathanial Valentino
- Niko Kaim
- Robbie McMahon
- Robyn Mukoyi
- Roxy Johnson
- Ruby Torry
- Ryan Taylor

=== Duration of cast ===
Cast members
Cast members	1	2	3	4	5	6	7	8	9	10
Abbie										
Amelia										
Ant										
Bethan										
Chloe										
James										
Louis										
Marty										
Nathan										
Dates
Aaron										
Anya										
Brandon										
Charlie										
Chloe A										
Darcy										
Devon										
Harrison										
India										
Jack										
Jade										
Jay										
Josh										
Kelsey										
Kyle										
Molly										
Nathanial										
Niko										
Robbie										
Robyn										
Roxy										
Ruby										
Ryan										

= Cast member is featured in this episode
= Cast member arrives in the house
= Cast member returns to the series
= Cast member returns to the house
= Cast member does not feature in this episode
= Cast member leaves the series
= Cast member is not officially a cast member in this episode

== Episodes ==
No. overall	No. in season	Title	Original release date	Viewers (millions)
186	1	"The Single Have Landed"	5 October 2021	134,000
The Geordies are out of lockdown and back in the house but this time they’re all looking for love. Heads are turned when a new group of single lads and lasses move in with the OGs and Nathan is overwhelmed with both Devon and Niko fighting for his affection. Bethan believes it’s love at first sight for her and Jay, meanwhile Abbie cracks on with Charlie. Elsewhere Roxy agrees to go on a date with Louis before necking on with James, Ant thinks he’s found a connection with India, and Chloe F sets her sights on Jack. Nathan gives into temptation and spends the night with Niko.
187	2	"Someone's Getting Dumped"	12 October 2021	155,000
The first sets of dates commence and Louis is determined to make a good impression on Roxy. As sparks fly between Jay and Bethan, she struggles with the concept of catching feelings again. Elsewhere Nathan chooses Niko for a date despite admitting to having a deeper connection with Devon, and Amelia’s arrival pleases Ryan. Just as the new single housemates begin to settle in a further three bombshells arrive, and the OGs are forced to decide whose dating journey to cut short in order to make space for them.
188	3	"Chloe Shoots Her Hot"	19 October 2021	166,000
Jack, Niko and Robyn’s time in the house comes to an abrupt end following a shock twist, whilst Louis wastes no time in getting to know newbie Jade. Nathanial calls Nathan out for playing both him and Devon, meanwhile Charlie pulls out all the stops to impress Abbie when he realises he may have competition in Brandon. Bethan’s not impressed to be used as a pawn in Nathanial’s scheme to make Nathan jealous, and Charlie loses out to Brandon in the race for Abbie. A further three new singles join the party, meaning another brutal decision must be made.
189	4	"Return of the Mac"	26 October 2021	183,000
The game is over for Charlie, India and Ryan as they’re sent packing. Chloe F and Jade compete for Louis, and a spanner is thrown in the works when James is sent on a date with Molly. Jay fears he’s lost his connection with Bethan, just as Abbie’s grows with Brandon. Elsewhere, Darcy’s misunderstanding causes Nathanial to explode. With Chloe F admitting she’s smitten with Louis, she’s rocked by the arrival of her ex-boyfriend Marty. Roxy marks her territory with James, Jade feels disrespected, and Marty successfully drives a wedge between Chloe F and Louis.
190	5	"Kiss Louis Goodbye"	2 November 2021	119,000
Nathanial and Darcy clear the air, whilst Chloe F is drawn to Marty once again. The original boys are given the power in sending two people home, and their decision to choose Brandon and Darcy leaves Abbie fuming. Two more singles set pulses racing, Louis pours his heart out to Chloe F unaware her heart lies with Marty instead, and Ant is racked with guilt after pursuing Molly but kissing Jade. James and Roxy take their relationship to the next step, meanwhile Jade confesses to Molly about her kiss with Ant, and Chloe F has a moment of weakness with Marty.
191	6	"Just A Kiss?"	9 November 2021	146,000
It’s the morning after the night before and Chloe F wakes up full of regret following her kiss with Marty. Amelia is disappointed to hear that Robbie hasn’t been entirely honest with her, Devon is unfazed by Nathan and Nathanial’s close bond, and Molly is envious of Ant’s date with Ruby. Louis hits the roof when he discovers Chloe F’s betrayal, and Bethan is stuck in the middle of the warring pair. Elsewhere Kelsey and Harrison’s arrival means another tough decision has to be made as the girls must elect three people to send home.
192	7	"Unfinished Business"	16 November 2021	103,000
It’s curtains for Jay, Nathanial and Robbie as their time in the house is cut short. Kelsey admits she’s attracted to Louis but is wary of his past with Chloe F. Molly’s not impressed to hear that Ant has attempted to kiss Kelsey on their date, and Chloe F is finally honest with Louis about her feelings towards Marty. Nathan is spoilt for choice following Devon and Harrison’s intention to win his heart, and Louis and Marty fail to see eye to eye. Elsewhere the gang are sent for a night on the town, but not before another savage eviction.
193	8	"Out Out"	23 November 2021	103,000
Aaron and Jade’s quest for love comes to end as the OGs decide their fate. Marty wastes no time in letting Kelsey know about Louis’s comment towards Chloe F about their unfinished business, meanwhile another set of singles arrive meaning business. Tempers flare as Louis and Marty go head to head, and Kelsey realises she may have a love rival in Anya. Roxy celebrates her birthday in style with a Geordie house party, Chloe A catches the eye of Ant, Louis and Bethan, whilst Marty risks his relationship with Chloe F by kissing Kelsey.
194	9	"Make Or Break"	30 November 2021	137,000
Molly packs her bags after being rejected one too many times by Ant, meanwhile Amelia is stunned by Josh’s cold behaviour towards her. Chloe F considers getting back together with Marty unaware he’s racked with guilt following his kiss with Kelsey. Nathan realises it’s time for an honest conversation with Devon regarding his feelings for Harrison, and Chloe F understands she’s had a lucky escape in the wake of Marty’s confession. As the power lies in their hands, Bethan and Louis clash over who they feel should be sent home next.
195	10	"End of the Road"	7 December 2021	68,000
Devon is sent home by Bethan, who believed him being in the house could be a hindrance to Nathan progressing with Harrison. Abbie refuses to let Josh put a wedge between her and Amelia, and Ant believes he can be happy with Chloe A on the outside. The group celebrate their last night together by hosting a white party, where Louis makes a move on Kelsey, and Nathan and Harrison finally get cosy. Believing he was successful in finding love, James asks Roxy to be his girlfriend, whilst Chloe F leaves with Marty but not before clearing the air with Louis.

== Ratings ==
Episode	Date	MTV weekly rank	Total MTV viewers
Episode 1	5 October 2021	134,000	2
Episode 2	12 October 2021	155,000	1
Episode 3	19 October 2021	166,000	2
Episode 4	26 October 2021	183,000	1
Episode 5	2 November 2021	119,000	3
Episode 6	9 November 2021	146,000	1
Episode 7	16 November 2021	103,000	4
Episode 8	23 November 2021	103,000	2
Episode 9	30 November 2021	137,000	1
Episode 10	7 December 2021	68,000	2
Average viewers		131,000	2
