= Geordie Shore: Big Birthday Battle =

- Series Spin-off
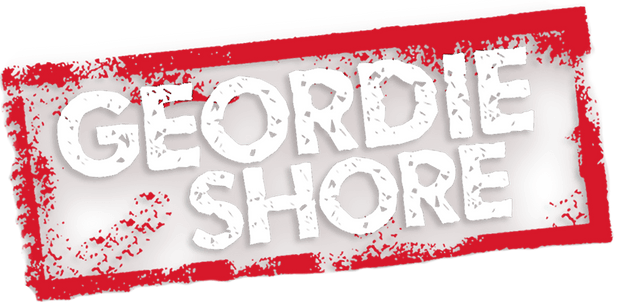
- No. of episodes: 6

Release
- Original network: MTV
- Original release: 10 May – 14 June 2016

Season chronology
- ← Previous; Series 12 Next → Series 13

Geordie Shore: Big Birthday Battle, a spin-off series of Geordie Shore, a British television programme based in Newcastle upon Tyne was confirmed on 6 February 2016 following cast member Scott's win on Celebrity Big Brother it was announced that he'd be filming for the next series of Geordie Shore the next day. However, on 12 February 2016 it was confirmed that the cast past and present would be reuniting for a mini-series to celebrate five years of the show. The series began airing on 10 May 2016. It features all of the current cast members and the return of former cast members Daniel Thomas-Tuck, James Tindale, Jay Gardner, Kyle Christie, Ricci Guarnaccio and Sophie Kasaei. The only past cast members that did not return for this series were Greg Lake, Rebecca Walker and Vicky Pattison. This series is classified as "Geordie Shore: Big Birthday Battle" and not billed as the thirteenth series. The series also features a new twist with Gaz and Charlotte going head-to-head as team captains planning the best nights out for their team. This series includes a special episode airing on the fifth birthday, on 24 May 2016 featuring the Geordie's reactions of previous episodes. The series also includes the show's 100th episode, airing on 31 May 2016. On 1 June 2016 it was announced that original cast member Charlotte Crosby had quit the show and that this would be her final series.

== Cast ==
Team Charlotte:

- Aaron Chalmers
- Charlotte-Letitia Crosby
- Daniel Thomas-Tuck
- Holly Hagan
- James Tindale
- Marty McKenna
- Nathan Henry
- Scott Timlin

Team Gary:

- Chantelle Connelly
- Chloe Ferry
- Gaz Beadle
- Jay Gardner
- Marnie Simpson
- Ricci Guarnaccio
- Sophie Kasaei
- Kyle Christie

=== Duration of cast ===
Cast members
Cast members	1	2	3	4	5	6
Aaron						
Chantelle						
Charlotte						
Chloe						
Dan						
Gaz						
Holly						
James						
Jay						
Kyle						
Marnie						
Marty						
Nathan						
Ricci						
Scott						
Sophie						

= Cast member is featured in this episode.
= Cast member voluntarily leaves the house.
= Cast member returns to the house.
= Cast member leaves the series.
= Cast member returns to the series.
= Cast member does not feature in this episode.
= Cast member is not officially a cast member in this episode.

== Episodes ==
No. overall	No. in season	Title	Original release date	Viewers (millions)
–	1	"Episode 1"	10 May 2016	1.186
The group arrive back at the house following Anna's instructions as Holly announces she's now single, and Charlotte and Gaz agree not to pull anybody else. Anna reveals that Charlotte and Gaz will be going head-to-head as team captains hosting party nights. As the captains choose their teams, the groups begin to plan their themed nights out but they receive another huge surprise when Sophie returns to the house joining Team Gaz. Charlotte is delighted to hear that Gaz turned down the chance to kiss another girl, and Holly refuses to make an effort for her team. After the first night out, Anna announces that Team Charlotte have scored the first point with their royal themed party.
–	2	"Episode 2"	17 May 2016	1.196
2 more faces walk through the door! There's a race to the shag pad but who will win? Gary shows Charlotte commitment she's never seen before, but is everyone happy for them?
–	3	"Episode 3"	24 May 2016	1.158
Boss Anna is livid after viewing some embarrassing footage. The house has been trashed! Two more old housemates arrive. Marty kicks off over Chloe, and Gary goes on a date with Charlotte.
–	4	"Episode 4"	31 May 2016	1.303
Holly's dream turns into reality as a blast from the past walks through the door! Charlotte's team vow to sabotage Gary as payback, but will they pull it off or will it backfire?!
–	5	"Episode 5"	7 June 2016	1.175
Scotty T is back! A night of partying at work leaves Charlotte's team buzzing and a huge mistake is made that forces Gary to leave the house. Is it all over for him and Charlotte?!
–	6	"Episode 6"	14 June 2016	1.150
It's the final, but with NO Gaz and Charlotte upset both teams need new leaders. Anna has a surprise after the final parties...but who has won the competition?!

== Ratings ==
Episode	Date	Official MTV rating	MTV weekly rank	Official MTV+1 rating	Total MTV viewers
Episode 1	10 May 2016	1,136,000	1	50,000	1,186,000
Episode 2	17 May 2016	1,129,000	1	67,000	1,196,000
The Geordies React	24 May 2016	443,000	2	20,000	463,000
Episode 3	24 May 2016	1,115,000	1	43,000	1,158,000
Episode 4	31 May 2016	1,256,000	1	47,000	1,303,000
Episode 5	7 June 2016	1,112,000	1	63,000	1,175,000
Episode 6	14 June 2016	1,100,000	1	50,000	1,150,000
