= Geordie Shore series 19 =

Geordie Shore
- Series 19
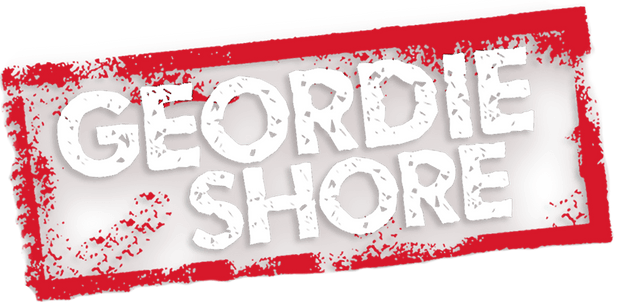
- No. of episodes: 10

Release
- Original network: MTV
- Original release: 9 April – 11 June 2019

Series chronology
- ← Previous; Series 18 Next → Series 20

The nineteenth series of Geordie Shore, a British television programme based in Newcastle Upon Tyne began airing on 9 April 2019. It concluded after ten episodes on 11 June 2019. Ahead of the series it was confirmed that four new cast had joined; Beau Brennan, Tahlia Chung, Bethan Kershaw and Natalie Phillips. They replaced former cast member Faith Mullen who did not return to the show. This series also marks the end for Scott Timlin and Alex MacPherson, and original cast members Sophie Kasaei and Holly Hagan. Chloe Ferry also announced her departure from the show, but later returned for the next series. Despite not being official cast members, Abbie Holborn and Adam Guthrie continued to make appearances throughout the series.

== Cast ==
- Alex MacPherson
- Beau Brennan
- Tahlia Chung
- Chloe Ferry
- Holly Hagan
- Sam Gowland
- Nathan Henry
- Sophie Kasaei
- Bethan Kershaw
- Natalie Phillips
- Scott Timlin

=== Duration of cast ===
Cast members
Cast members	1	2	3	4	5	6	7	8	9	10
Alex										
Beau										
Bethan										
Chloe										
Holly										
Nat										
Nathan										
Sam										
Scotty T										
Sophie										
Tahlia										

= Cast member is featured in this episode.
= Cast member arrives in the house.
= Cast member voluntarily leaves the house.
= Cast member leaves the series.
= Cast member returns to the series.
= Cast member features in this episode, but is outside of the house.
= Cast member does not feature in this episode.
= Cast member is not officially a cast member in this episode.

== Episodes ==
No. overall	No. in season	Title	Original release date	Viewers (millions)
158	1	"All Change in the House"	9 April 2019	0.412
Scotty T drags the group back to the house for more work, but they’re shocked by the amount of absences. However it’s not long before newbies Beau, Bethan, Nat and Tahlia make themselves at home. There’s an instant connection between Beau and Bethan, but he also has his sights on Tahlia. Elsewhere Chloe and Nathan have a heart-to-heart about the breakdown of the relationship with his boyfriend, Tahlia is determined to move on from her ex-boyfriend, and Scotty T takes the workers on a journey they’ll never forget. Nat is there to support a broken Nathan.
159	2	"Nathan Needs a House Party"	16 April 2019	0.413
Nathan decides to embrace being single rather than feeling sorry for himself, and the group plan a house party in order to lift everybody’s spirits. Chloe is jealous of the attention Sophie receives from her boyfriend, feeling that Sam doesn’t give her enough, whilst Bethan and Beau admit to liking each other. Chloe is far from impressed when Nathan dares Tahlia and Beau to kiss during a trip to work, Sophie finds it difficult to separate herself from her boyfriend, and Abbie re-joins the group for a night out. The night quickly descends into chaos when Bethan catches Beau giving Abbie a kiss.
160	3	"Beau & Bethan Get It On!"	23 April 2019	0.406
It’s the morning after the night before and Beau’s concerned that Bethan won’t accept his apology. Elsewhere Nathan is hurt when Chloe doesn’t invite him to a girls night back at home, and Sam meets with Adam for a catch-up. Nathan and Chloe agree to disagree for the sake of their friendship, Beau tells Bethan that he’s still keen on getting to know her, whilst Tahlia lets her hair down and goes on the pull. Beau admits to feeling pressured by the others and would rather things develop naturally with Bethan, as Nat worries how her girlfriend will react following a drunken snog with Nathan.
161	4	"Buckle Up! The Geordies Hit Belfast!"	30 April 2019	0.417
Chloe feels like a third wheel in her own relationship as Sam and Nathan begin to spend more time together, as Anna sends the group to Belfast in their new bus. Beau admits to genuinely liking Bethan but wants to take things slowly, Sophie feels lost in the house without her boyfriend, and Tahlia finally begins to come out of her shell. After a few too many, Chloe loses her temper with Sam leaving him shocked by her accusations. Elsewhere Bethan can’t resist Beau’s charm any longer, and a distraught Chloe tells Sam that they need to go on a break.
162	5	"The Family Is Rocked!"	7 May 2019	0.302
Sophie is fed up of the drama in the house and contemplates leaving it all behind, whilst Nathan tries to fix the rift between Chloe and Sam. Sam learns that Chloe’s insecurities from her past relationships have been causing her lack of trust, and the pair decide to work around it. Sophie is knocked for six when Alex returns to the house leaving her with a huge decision to make about her future, and the group try out “Disco Dodgeball” for Anna. Tahlia enjoys the attention received from Alex, meanwhile Sophie sneaks off during a night out to pack her bags and leave the house for good.
163	6	"Trouble In Paradise!"	14 May 2019	0.330
Nathan meets up with Sophie to hear that she has no regrets to leaving the house, but would consider returning part time. Bethan is wary of Beau around Abbie when Scotty T sends the group on a singles night, whilst Nathan gets the man of his dreams. Beau faces Bethan’s wrath after his conversation with Abbie comes to light, Sam plans a gesture for Chloe in order to boost her self-esteem, and Tahlia and Adam share a kiss. Bethan bites the bullet to try and salvage what she and Beau have, but things go from bad to worse when he tells her their romance can’t continue.
164	7	"Beau & Bethan Back On!"	21 May 2019	0.269
Alex has some explaining to do when Beau notices him and Bethan flirting with each other on a night out. Tahlia confronts Nat over her patronising behaviour, whilst Sam surprises Chloe with a shopping trip. Bethan and Alex come to blows when neither take responsibility for flirting, leaving Scotty T to pick up the pieces during another day at work. Elsewhere Beau has a heart to heart with Chloe about his past relationships, and the only singles in the group Tahlia, Nathan and Alex get close in the hot tub. Bethan is over the moon when Beau agrees to giving her another chance.
165	8	"Cardiff Carnage"	28 May 2019	0.293
Scotty T sends the group to Cardiff for work, and Beau is delighted that he’ll get to see his brother who lives there. Bethan tells the girls that she’s happy with how her relationship with Beau is going; however he tells the boys that he’s not ready for a relationship with her yet. Elsewhere Alex has an accident during a water sports session, and Scotty T calls an end to the trip. The Geordies defy Scotty T by staying another night in Cardiff where Tahlia necks on with Beau’s brother. Beau is forced to let Bethan down gently when he realises that they aren’t on the same page.
166	9	"Dizzy Heights!"	4 June 2019	0.324
Anna dishes out punishments when she finds out the group stayed an extra night in Cardiff. Nathan suggests throwing a house party instead of going out, where Alex feels home sick as he’s surrounded by everybody else’s family and friends. Chloe jumps to the wrong conclusion when she spots Beau speaking to Abbie, and Bethan introduces herself to Beau’s sister. Elsewhere Tahlia is spoilt for choice when she has Adam and Beau’s brother competing for her attention, and Alex decides to head back to Australia. Bethan pulls out all the stops to ensure Chloe and Sam have a romantic night.
167	10	"Fight Night!"	11 June 2019	0.346
Nathan surprises Tahlia by arranging for Beau’s brother to join them on another night out. Chloe worries about the lack of sex she’s having with Sam, whilst Bethan heard from Beau’s brother what he’s really like outside of the house. The group show their support for former family member Aaron during his MMA fight, Bethan is overjoyed when Beau tells her he’s ready to finally commit to her, and Nathan admits to being ready to move on from his ex-boyfriend. The family say an emotional farewell to each other before all going their separate ways.

== Ratings ==
Episode	Date	MTV weekly rank	Total MTV viewers
Episode 1	9 April 2019	1	412,000
Episode 2	16 April 2019	1	413,000
Episode 3	23 April 2019	1	406,000
Episode 4	30 April 2019	1	417,000
Episode 5	7 May 2019	1	302,000
Episode 6	14 May 2019	1	330,000
Episode 7	21 May 2019	1	269,000
Episode 8	28 May 2019	1	293,000
Episode 9	4 June 2019	1	324,000
Episode 10	11 June 2019	1	346,000
Average viewers		1	351,000
