= Geordie Shore series 12 =

Geordie Shore
- Series 12
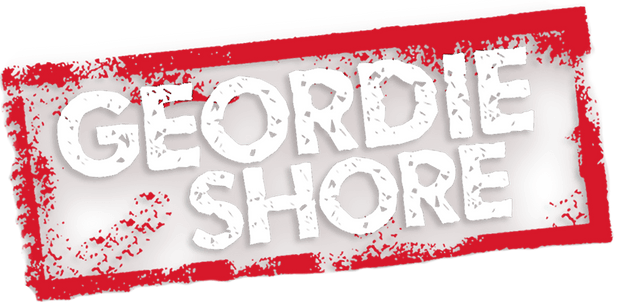
- No. of episodes: 8

Release
- Original network: MTV
- Original release: 15 March – 3 May 2016

Series chronology
- ← Previous; Series 11 Next → Big Birthday Battle

The twelfth series of Geordie Shore, a British television programme based in Newcastle upon Tyne was confirmed on 23 May 2015 when it was confirmed that MTV had renewed the series for a further three series taking it up to the thirteenth series. The series was filmed in October and November 2015 and began airing on 15 March 2016. This was the first series not to include Kyle Christie since he made his exit during the previous series, and was the first to feature new cast members Chantelle Connelly and Marty McKenna, who had previously appeared during the third series of Ex on the Beach.

== Cast ==
- Aaron Chalmers
- Chantelle Connelly
- Charlotte-Letitia Crosby
- Chloe Ferry
- Gary Beadle
- Holly Hagan
- Marnie Simpson
- Marty McKenna
- Nathan Henry
- Scott Timlin

=== Duration of cast ===
Cast members
Cast members	1	2	3	4	5	6	7	8
Aaron								
Chantelle								
Charlotte								
Chloe								
Gaz								
Holly								
Marnie								
Marty								
Nathan								
Scott								

= Cast member is featured in this episode.
= Cast member arrives in the house.
= Cast member voluntarily leaves the house.
= Cast member leaves and returns to the house in the same episode.
= Cast member returns to the house.
= Cast member returns to the series.
= Cast member does not feature in this episode.
= Cast member is not officially a cast member in this episode.

== Episodes ==
No. overall	No. in season	Title	Original release date	Viewers (millions)
87	1	"Episode 1"	15 March 2016	1.202
The Geordies are back! Chloe turns on her charm to try to get with Scott. Holly has a huge secret but will she tell anyone? A shock new arrival sees the lads buzzin' and Chloe stressing.
88	2	"Episode 2"	22 March 2016	1.158
Charlotte finally turns up with some bunnies and some bigger news for Gaz. Will Holly share her secret? Aaron and Scott's dates with Chantelle end badly as the lads and Chloe all kick off.
89	3	"Episode 3"	29 March 2016	1.250
Charlotte gets the girls to go hard on Gaz, Scott drops the girlfriend bomb on Chantelle and Holly has a big bust up with Charlotte when she sees her kissing Chloe.
90	4	"Episode 4"	5 April 2016	1.303
With Holly away, Chloe and Charlotte's friendship goes next level. Chantelle's plan to test Scott goes badly wrong and Chloe is quick to take advantage.
91	5	"Episode 5"	12 April 2016	1.217
Boss Anna treats the Geordies with a trip to Hull.Gaz and Charlotte spend the night together, Chloe finally comes clean to Chantelle over what she gave Scott and it all Kicks off.
92	6	"Episode 6"	19 April 2016	1.367
Chloe is buzzin' when a new lad arrives. Marnie goes mental when a girl of Aaron's turns up and it kicks off again when the newbie drops Scott right in it with Chantelle
93	7	"Episode 7"	26 April 2016	1.220
Marnie necks on with new lad Marty to teach Aaron a lesson. Charlotte's got Chloe's back when it all kicks off between the girls. Gary and Charlotte end up in bed causing ripples.
94	8	"Episode 8"	3 May 2016	1.183
It's the final episode. Gary returns and drops a bombshell. New boy Marty can't get a stiffy with Chloe. Holly needs to make an all important decision and there's a shock exit!

== Ratings ==
Episode	Date	Official MTV rating	MTV weekly rank	Official MTV+1 rating	Total MTV viewers
Episode 1	15 March 2016	1,172,000	1	30,000	1,202,000
Episode 2	22 March 2016	1,112,000	1	46,000	1,158,000
Episode 3	29 March 2016	1,209,000	1	41,000	1,250,000
Episode 4	5 April 2016	1,286,000	1	17,000	1,303,000
Episode 5	12 April 2016	1,173,000	1	44,000	1,217,000
Episode 6	19 April 2016	1,339,000	1	28,000	1,367,000
Episode 7	26 April 2016	1,201,000	1	19,000	1,220,000
Episode 8	3 May 2016	1,139,000	1	44,000	1,183,000
