= Geordie Shore series 11 =

Geordie Shore
- Series 11
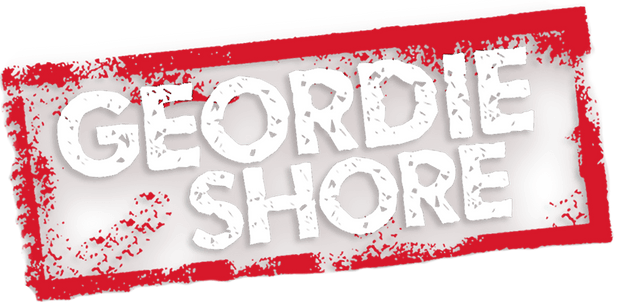
- No. of episodes: 10

Release
- Original network: MTV
- Original release: 20 October – 22 December 2015

Series chronology
- ← Previous; Series 10 Next → Series 12

The eleventh series of Geordie Shore, a British television programme based in Newcastle upon Tyne was confirmed on 23 May 2015 when it was confirmed that MTV had renewed the series for a further three series. The show began on 20 October 2015. This is the first series not to include original cast member James Tindale after he departed at the beginning of the previous series. Ahead of the series it was confirmed that the series would be filmed in Greece. In September 2015 when the series premiere was announced, it was confirmed that the cast members would air for 10 episodes, making it the longest series to date. It was also confirmed that the cast had travelled to Zante, Malia, Mykonos, Ios as well as Athens for the series.

== Cast ==
- Aaron Chalmers
- Charlotte-Letitia Crosby
- Chloe Ferry
- Gary Beadle
- Holly Hagan
- Kyle Christie
- Marnie Simpson
- Nathan Henry
- Scott Timlin

=== Duration of cast ===
Cast members
Cast members	1	2	3	4	5	6	7	8	9	10
Aaron										
Charlotte										
Chloe										
Gaz										
Holly										
Kyle										
Marnie										
Nathan										
Scott										

= Cast member is featured in this episode.
= Cast member leaves the series.
= Cast member does not feature in this episode.

== Episodes ==
No. overall	No. in season	Title	Original release date	Viewers (millions)
77	1	"Episode 1"	20 October 2015	1.003
The Geordies are back and buzzin' as big boss Anna sends them off to the home of kebab...Greece. Holly and Kyle kick off while Gaz and Charlotte find themselves in a very awkward situation
78	2	"Episode 2"	27 October 2015	0.945
Big boss Anna sends the guys to their new home in Crete. Chloe wants to know where she stands with Scott. Charlotte and Marnie have some explaining to do after their first night in Malia.
79	3	"Episode 3"	3 November 2015	1.246
Gaz's pulling competition causes a bust up for Aaron and Scott. Charlotte tells Holly some home truths about Kyle while the toga party sees Chloe and Scott get closer than ever.
80	4	"Episode 4"	10 November 2015	1.150
Chloe causes carnage at the boat party while Kyle comes to a big decision over Holly. Marnie sees Kyle at the club and the simmering tensions boil over and it all kicks off.
81	5	"Episode 5"	17 November 2015	1.250
Gaz gives newly dumped Holly some tough love. Kyle enjoys his first lads' night until the girls turn up unannounced. Charlotte kicks off leaving the boys and girls torn apart.
82	6	"Episode 6"	24 November 2015	1.158
Kyle and Holly's split continues to divide the boys and girls. Scott upsets Chloe, Holly confronts Kyle while Charlotte goes to extraordinary lengths in search of a kebab.
83	7	"Episode 7"	1 December 2015	1.182
Chloe's attempt to get Scott's attention goes badly while the Holly and Kyle situation comes to a head as the boys come to blows with huge consequences for Holly and Kyle.
84	8	"Episode 8"	8 December 2015	1.162
After his dramatic exit, the Geordies come to terms with life after Kyle. Chloe's plan to make Scott jealous backfires and Charlotte gives Holly some very tough love.
85	9	"Episode 9"	15 December 2015	1.250
Chloe and Holly kick off before Chloe confronts Scott and lets slip how she truly feels. Meanwhile, Marnie gets an unexpected call while Nathan has some big news for the family.
86	10	"Episode 10"	22 December 2015	1.148
The Geordie Squad's big Greek adventure comes to a dramatic end. There's a surprise arrival for one of the family and Marnie has some massive news.

== Ratings ==
Episode	Date	Official MTV rating	MTV weekly rank	Official MTV+1 rating	Total MTV viewers
Episode 1	20 October 2015	957,000	1	46,000	1,003,000
Episode 2	27 October 2015	916,000	1	29,000	945,000
Episode 3	3 November 2015	1,169,000	1	77,000	1,246,000
Episode 4	10 November 2015	1,090,000	1	60,000	1,150,000
Episode 5	17 November 2015	1,217,000	1	33,000	1,250,000
Episode 6	24 November 2015	1,083,000	1	75,000	1,158,000
Episode 7	1 December 2015	1,119,000	1	63,000	1,182,000
Episode 8	8 December 2015	1,084,000	1	78,000	1,162,000
Episode 9	15 December 2015	1,181,000	1	69,000	1,250,000
Episode 10	22 December 2015	1,073,000	1	75,000	1,148,000
