= Geordie Shore series 18 =

Geordie Shore
- Series 18
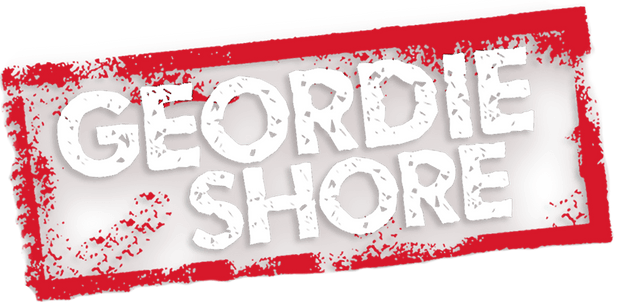
- No. of episodes: 10

Release
- Original network: MTV
- Original release: 16 October – 18 December 2018

Series chronology
- ← Previous; Series 17 Next → Series 19

The eighteenth series of Geordie Shore, a British television programme based in Newcastle Upon Tyne was filmed in July 2018 and began airing on 16 October 2018. It concluded after ten episodes on 18 December 2018. This was the first series to include new cast member Faith Mullen. Ahead of the series it was announced that former cast member Scott Timlin would be making a return to the show. It was also announced that former cast members James Tindale, Kyle Christie and Alex MacPherson would all be making guest appearances throughout the series.

== Cast ==
- Chloe Ferry
- Holly Hagan
- Sam Gowland
- Adam Guthrie
- Nathan Henry
- Abbie Holborn
- Sophie Kasaei
- Alex MacPherson
- Faith Mullen
- Scott Timlin

=== Duration of cast ===
Cast members
Cast members	1	2	3	4	5	6	7	8	9	10
Abbie										
Adam										
Alex										
Chloe										
Faith										
Holly										
Nathan										
Sam										
Scott										
Sophie										

= Cast member is featured in this episode.
= Cast member arrives in the house.
= Cast member leaves and returns to the house in the same episode.
= Cast member returns to the house.
= Cast member leaves the series.
= Cast member returns to the series.
= Cast member features in this episode, but is outside of the house.
= Cast member does not feature in this episode.
= Cast member is not officially a cast member in this episode.

== Episodes ==
No. overall	No. in season	Title	Original release date	Viewers (millions)
148	1	"Gotta Have Faith"	16 October 2018	0.583
Anna sends the Geordies back to the house where she reveals that Scotty T will be returning as her new business partner. Faith arrives as the new family member and instantly gels with the girls, but has a secret she’s scared of sharing. Elsewhere Adam makes a move on Abbie unaware that she doesn’t feel the same way, and Chloe and Sam decide to make more of an effort with the rest of the group in order to keep the peace. Faith’s confession raises questions from Chloe, and Nathan gets up to no good when fuelled with alcohol.
149	2	"Geordie Dinner Party"	23 October 2018	0.454
Sam and Chloe host a house warming party to show off their new home, whilst Sophie meets up with a newly single James. Chloe is determined to learn more about Faith’s beliefs unaware that she may be causing offence. Adam finally gives up on Abbie when she rejects one of his kisses, Scotty T gives the Geordies their first mission, and Faith feels rejected during a night out with the group. Abbie and Adam’s competition to pull other people takes a surprise twist, and the tension between Chloe and Faith increases.
150	3	"Girls Trip"	30 October 2018	0.390
Sophie plans a trip to Blackpool for the girls while Scotty T sends the boys to work. Chloe and Faith’s feud continues following a failed attempt at an apology. Elsewhere, back in Newcastle Nathan kicks off with Sam after being humiliated by him in a club, and Adam ends up in bed with one of Abbie’s closest friends. The girls receive a shock when the boys arrive in Blackpool to surprise them, whilst Chloe and Faith finally call a truce. Adam and Sam begin to feel sorry for Faith after noticing her dancing on her own, meanwhile Nathan has an accident in a B&B.
151	4	"Sophie and Sam Fall Out"	6 November 2018	0.416
Sophie defends Faith when Chloe fears that she still isn’t being herself around the girls. The group return home but are faced with more drama when a passing comment from Sam makes Chloe question their relationship, and Sophie is quick to stand by her friend. Nathan confronts Faith when he feels that she’s isolating herself from the rest of the group, whilst Chloe and Sam take a break from the house in order to focus on themselves. Elsewhere Adam continues to try his luck with Abbie but is unfortunate to get nowhere.
152	5	"It's Snowing in Newcastle"	13 November 2018	0.474
Despite originally clearing the air, Sam still feels Sophie needs to stay out of his and Chloe’s business. Nathan makes it his mission to make Faith feel more involved in the group, whilst Abbie begins to feel awkward around Adam. Nathan is delighted when Chloe promises to spend the night with him rather than Sam, but is left disappointed again when her attention is drawn back to her boyfriend. Elsewhere Adam and Abbie come to blows when he makes another move on her, and Sophie and Sam call a truce for the sake of their housemates.
153	6	"Benidorm Bound"	20 November 2018	0.460
With the tension between Abbie and Adam increasing and Sophie feeling that Chloe keeps abandoning the girls, the group plan a games night in order to lighten the mood. Abbie confronts her friend for kissing Adam before throwing a drink over him instead, and then clashes with Faith for making insulting comments. Anna sends the Geordies to Benidorm to house sit, where Abbie has some making up to do. Elsewhere Sam has no choice but to defend his girlfriend during an argument with Sophie causing her to lash out and punch him.
154	7	"Nana Joins The Gang"	27 November 2018	0.401
It’s the morning after the night before in Benidorm and Sam demands an apology from Sophie. Elsewhere Nathan suggests a trip to the water park where Sophie and Chloe make amends. Nathan still feels there’s an atmosphere between him and Chloe but neither are willing to make the first move to resolve their differences. Abbie’s Nana joins the gang on a night out where she brings everyone together, and Chloe and Nathan finally clear the air. Sophie reveals that she’s really enjoying her single lifestyle, and Faith puts her pulling skills to the test.
155	8	"A Double Return"	4 December 2018	0.320
When the gang arrive back on home turf, they’re shocked by the arrival of Alex who has come to win back Sophie’s heart. However Alex instantly causes friction by flirting with Abbie and making her feel uncomfortable. Holly returns to the house to give Sophie some much needed advice, and Nathan is in his element as he visits Newcastle Pride. There are further fireworks when Sophie catches Alex in a compromising position with Abbie, causing an almighty row when they all arrive back at the house following a night out.
156	9	"Holly Gets a Shock"	11 December 2018	0.364
Chloe takes Sam on a date to the ice rink to show off her skills. Alex desperately tries to make amends with Sophie, but things take a turn for the worse when she spots another moment between him and Abbie. Elsewhere Faith lets her hair down, and Holly tells Sophie that Alex is just holiday romance material. Holly is horrified when Scotty T brings a blast from her past to work in the form of Kyle, and Alex finally makes it back into Sophie’s good books. A clearly shaken Holly has some choice words for Kyle, and it only makes Sam realise that his relationship with Chloe is stronger than ever.
157	10	"Geordie Fest"	18 December 2018	0.294
Abbie celebrates her 21st birthday in style as the group plan her a festival themed house party with her Nana as a special guest. Sophie and Alex take their relationship to the next step by going on an official date, whilst Nathan organises a colonic irrigation session for Abbie. On the last night, Sophie finally gives into temptation and has sex with Alex for the first time in Newcastle. The Geordies face another emotional goodbye to each other as Faith reflects on her turbulent stay.

== Ratings ==
Episode	Date	MTV weekly rank	Total MTV viewers
Episode 1	16 October 2018	1	583,000
Episode 2	23 October 2018	1	454,000
Episode 3	30 October 2018	1	390,000
Episode 4	6 November 2018	1	416,000
Episode 5	13 November 2018	1	474,000
Episode 6	20 November 2018	1	460,000
Episode 7	27 November 2018	1	401,000
Episode 8	4 December 2018	1	320,000
Episode 9	11 December 2018	1	364,000
Episode 10	18 December 2018	1	294,000
Average viewers		1	416,000
