= Geordie Shore series 14 =

Geordie Shore
- Series 14
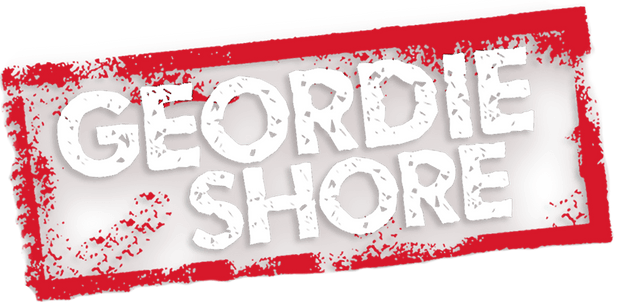
- No. of episodes: 12

Release
- Original network: MTV
- Original release: 28 March – 13 June 2017

Series chronology
- ← Previous; Series 13 Next → Series 15

The fourteenth series of Geordie Shore, a British television programme based in Newcastle upon Tyne, was confirmed on 31 October 2016 when cast member Scotty T announced that he would be taking a break from the series to focus on other commitments. The series was filmed in November 2016, and began airing on 28 March 2017. Ahead of the series, it was also confirmed that original cast member Holly Hagan had quit the show, following her exit in the previous series. On 28 February 2017, it was announced that eight new cast members had joined for this series. Zahida Allen, Chelsea Barber, Sam Bentham, Sarah Goodhart, Abbie Holborn, Elettra Lamborghini, Billy Phillips and Eve Shannon all appeared throughout the series hoping to become permanent members of the cast, and in the series finale, Holborn was chosen. Goodhart and Allen both previously appeared on Ex on the Beach, with the former appearing on the third series of the show as the ex-girlfriend of current Geordie Shore cast member Marty McKenna (before he joined the cast). Lamborghini has also appeared on Super Shore and participated in the fifth season of Gran Hermano VIP, the Spanish version of Celebrity Big Brother. It was also confirmed that Scotty T would return later in the series.

== Cast ==
- Zahida Allen
- Chelsea Barber
- Gaz Beadle
- Sam Bentham (aka Sam Rascals)
- Aaron Chalmers
- Chloe Ferry
- Sarah Goodhart
- Nathan Henry
- Abbie Holborn
- Sophie Kasaei
- Elettra Lamborghini
- Marty McKenna
- Billy Phillips
- Eve Shannon
- Marnie Simpson
- Scotty T

=== Duration of cast ===
Cast members
Cast members	1	2	3	4	5	6	7	8	9	10	11	12
Aaron												
Abbie												
Billy												
Chelsea												
Chloe												
Elettra												
Eve												
Gaz												
Marnie												
Marty												
Nathan												
Sam												
Sarah												
Scott												
Sophie												
Zahida												

= Cast member is featured in this episode.
= Cast member arrives in the house.
= Cast member voluntarily leaves the house.
= Cast member is removed from the house.
= Cast member returns to the house.
= Cast member leaves the series.
= Cast member returns to the series.
= Cast member does not feature in this episode.
= Cast member is not officially a cast member in this episode.

== Episodes ==
No. overall	No. in season	Title	Original release date	Viewers (millions)
105	1	"Episode 1"	28 March 2017	0.976
Anna invites the Geordies back to the house but promises big changes for them, whilst Marnie is delighted to have Sophie in the family again. Marty makes a promise to Chloe that he won’t get with anybody in the house, just as three new female workers arrive as part of Anna’s big new plans for her business. Aaron takes an instant liking to Abbie, whilst Sarah rubs Chloe up the wrong way. After hearing a rumour about Marty and Zahida getting close in the taxi, Chloe’s eruption causes a huge brawl in the house.
106	2	"Episode 2"	4 April 2017	0.963
Chloe is forced to face the consequences of her actions as Anna removes her from the house, and Sophie apologises to the new girls for the drama she caused for them. Aaron and Marty try their luck with Abbie and Sarah, but are left red faced when both refuse to give them anything more than a kiss. A further two new workers are sent into the house as Anna reveals that the originals have the power to decide who stays and who goes. Elsewhere Billy’s left in a spin after getting worse for wear, and Sarah fears she may lose her place in the house.
107	3	"Episode 3"	11 April 2017	0.850
Chloe returns to the house with a lot of apologising to do. Nathan comes up with some plans to test the newbies to see who is the most radge, but a further new worker Elettra arrives to stir things up. After seeing Marnie and Aaron share a moment, Marty accuses her of playing with his friend’s emotions. Chloe finally stands up to Marty after realising he hasn’t been entirely honest with her, and Billy is left with a lot to prove when the originals name him as the weakest newbie.
108	4	"Episode 4"	18 April 2017	1.036
As Chloe promises to move on from Marty, she can’t believe her luck when a further new worker arrives and instantly catches her eye. Aaron is confused when he continues to grow closer to Marnie despite her having a boyfriend, and Chloe and Marty compete for the affections of the newbies in a bid to prove they’re over each other. Meanwhile Sam tries to prove why he deserves his place in the house, and Elettra fails to give Marty anything more than a kiss.
109	5	"Episode 5"	25 April 2017	0.879
Marnie is delighted when her old friend Chelsea arrives as the final new worker, but it’s not long before she’s got her claws stuck into Aaron much to Marnie’s annoyance. After meeting to discuss which of the newbies have impressed the most, the originals assign the new workers the task of hosting a house party. Marnie gives Chelsea the green light to go with Aaron, but is thrown into a spin when she witnesses them both getting intimate leaving her no choice but to leave the house to clear her head.
110	6	"Episode 6"	2 May 2017	0.810
The group wake up to find that Marnie has gone home, leaving Chelsea overcome with guilt. Sophie confronts Chelsea over the reasons for Marnie’s departure causing fallouts in the house eventually leading to another head-to-head between Chloe and Marty. Anna delivers a shock blow to the newbies as she sends Billy, Chelsea and Eve packing – but tells those remaining that they’re not safe just yet. Elsewhere Marnie returns to pour her heart out to Aaron, and Elettra and Chloe team up against Marty.
111	7	"Episode 7"	9 May 2017	0.869
Anna sends all the originals to Tignes but makes it clear that not all of the newbies will be joining them. The group are delighted by the return of Scott, who is desperate to meet the new females. Abbie and Sarah compete for Scott’s attention but it’s Sarah who ends up in his bed causing Marty to get rowdy. Just as Sarah tells Marty that she has growing feelings for Scott, she’s unaware of his sudden U-turn as he tries to graft Abbie instead. Chloe is there to pick up the pieces for an upset Sarah, and Anna announced that Elettra will not be returning to the house.
112	8	"Episode 8"	16 May 2017	0.846
Things get increasingly awkward for Abbie and Sarah when both are too stubborn to speak to each other, whilst Marnie arrives in France to catch-up on the latest drama. Seeing her friend getting emotional over Marty, Zahida unleashes her anger out on the boys. Sarah’s torn over her feelings for both Marty and Scott, and the girls fear her behaviour in the house will cost her a place in the house. Elsewhere Scott continues to graft Abbie, and Aaron and Marnie clash.
113	9	"Episode 9"	23 May 2017	0.882
Determined to get his friend over his ex, Gaz takes Aaron under his wing and tries to get him to pull a girl. Sarah and Abbie finally confront each other over the Scott situation, and Abbie agrees to end things for the sake of their friendship. After being pied by both Abbie and Sarah, Scott turns his attentions towards Zahida. Aaron spots an intimate moment between Scott and Zahida before reminding her that she has a boyfriend outside of the house. Elsewhere Sarah is left picking up the pieces when Zahida vows to leave the house after further rumours spread.
114	10	"Episode 10"	30 May 2017	0.811
Zahida is still in denial over kissing Scott as the group return home, but further rumours circulate when the pair leave the club early together. After getting with Scott for a second time, Zahida faces the wrath of Marnie who calls her out for cheating on her boyfriend. Elsewhere Anna sends Sam home when she chooses her top three workers. Scott makes a confession to Gaz, who immediately confronts Zahida with the truth. But her guilt leads her to go AWOL, leaving Gaz no choice but to expose the truth to the others.
115	11	"Episode 11"	6 June 2017	0.830
As Zahida returns to the house, Sarah and Abbie join forces and team up against her. Anna has a final twist in store for the newbies when she announces that she will only be keeping one of them on full-time. The rivalry between Marnie and Zahida reaches new heights following yet another argument, and Sarah and Zahida finally come face-to-face. Just as Chloe thinks she’s in a good place with Marty, her anger boils over when she catches him getting cosy with Sarah again.
116	12	"Episode 12"	13 June 2017	0.645
Chloe tries to hide the fact that she cares about Marty and Sarah’s night together. Anna has one final test for Abbie, Sarah and Zahida to see which one of them is right for the job, as the originals eagerly wait for the result. Abbie arrives at Nathan’s 80s themed house party announcing that she is the chosen one, whilst Scott has a crushing confession to make to Abbie. Chloe finally confronts Marty with the way she feels about him.

== Ratings ==
Episode	Date	Official MTV rating	MTV weekly rank	Official MTV+1 rating	Total MTV viewers
Episode 1	28 March 2017	946,000	1	30,000	976,000
Episode 2	4 April 2017	938,000	1	25,000	963,000
Episode 3	11 April 2017	827,000	1	23,000	850,000
Episode 4	18 April 2017	1,025,000	1	11,000	1,036,000
Episode 5	25 April 2017	857,000	1	22,000	879,000
Episode 6	2 May 2017	790,000	1	20,000	810,000
Episode 7	9 May 2017	848,000	1	21,000	869,000
Episode 8	16 May 2017	814,000	1	32,000	846,000
Episode 9	23 May 2017	876,000	1	6,000	882,000
Episode 10	30 May 2017	808,000	1	2,000	811,000
Episode 11	6 June 2017	802,000	1	28,000	830,000
Episode 12	13 June 2017	630,000	1	15,000	645,000
