= Geordie Shore series 17 =

Geordie Shore
- Series 17
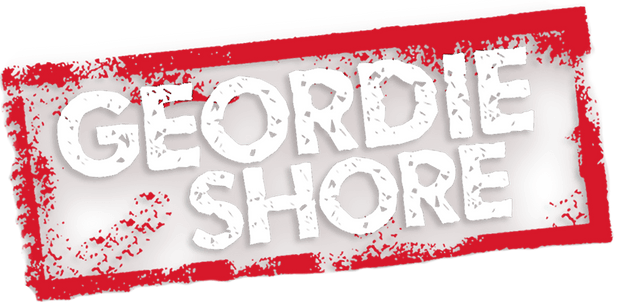
- No. of episodes: 12

Release
- Original network: MTV
- Original release: 15 May – 31 July 2018

Series chronology
- ← Previous; Series 16 Next → Series 18

The seventeenth series of Geordie Shore, a British television programme based in Newcastle Upon Tyne was filmed in February 2018, and began airing from 15 May 2018. It concluded following twelve episodes on 31 July 2018 making this the joint longest series to date. The series was filmed in Australia rather than Newcastle, making this the second series to be filmed here following the sixth series in 2013. Ahead of the series it was announced that former cast member Holly Hagan would be making a return to the show. Six new cast members joined the series, including Grant Molloy, Adam Guthrie and four Australians, Alex MacPherson, Nick Murdoch, Dee Nguyen, and Chrysten Zenoni. Zenoni had previously appeared in the fifth series of Ex on the Beach. The new cast members were to replace Aaron Chalmers and Marnie Simpson, who both announced that they'd quit the show, and Steph Snowdon who was fired after the sixteenth series.

== Cast ==
- Chloe Ferry
- Sam Gowland
- Adam Guthrie
- Holly Hagan
- Nathan Henry
- Abbie Holborn
- Sophie Kasaei
- Alex MacPherson
- Dee Nguyen
- Nick Murdoch
- Grant Molloy
- Chrysten Zenoni

=== Duration of cast ===
Cast members
Cast members	1	2	3	4	5	6	7	8	9	10	11	12
Abbie												
Adam												
Alex												
Chloe												
Chrysten												
Dee												
Grant												
Holly												
Nathan												
Nick												
Sam												
Sophie												

= Cast member is featured in this episode.
= Cast member arrives in the house.
= Cast member voluntarily leaves the house.
= Cast member leaves and returns to the house in the same episode.
= Cast member returns to the house.
= Cast member leaves the series.
= Cast member returns to the series.
= Cast member is not officially a cast member in this episode.

== Episodes ==
No. overall	No. in season	Title	Original release date	Viewers (millions)
136	1	"Australian Additions"	15 May 2018	0.446
The Geordie’s are delighted when Anna sends them to Australia on business. New boy Grant catches Abbie’s eyes but she’s left concerned over unanswered questions over his sexuality. The group are far from impressed to receive a visit from their new boss, whilst four new Australian locals descend on the house causing chaos for the originals. Alex hits a nerve with Sam when he gets close to Chloe, and the girls compete for Grant’s attention. After flirting with Abbie, it’s Dee who ends up getting cosy with Grant causing her to erupt.
137	2	"On the Pull"	22 May 2018	0.479
Abbie clears the air with Dee following their previous altercation, whilst Sophie is feeling left out. The boys compete for Abbie’s attention but she’s less than impressed by Nick’s efforts. Nathan airs his fears that he’s drifting away from Chloe since her relationship with Sam, causing upset within the group. Grant finally apologises to Abbie for his behaviour. Elsewhere Sophie’s confidence is knocked when Dee snatches her man whilst on the pull, and the Geordies struggle with the Australian wildlife.
138	3	"Sneaking Off to Byron Bay"	29 May 2018	0.468
Grant tries to play the long game with Abbie before making his move. Nathan, Sam and Abbie face their fears during a skydiving trip, and Chloe takes offence to a comment made by Nathan about her relationship with Sam. With some of the group at work, the others decide to head to Byron Bay for the weekend. Chloe rages to hear that Sam has gone away, but takes the opportunity to make amends with Nathan. Elsewhere Dee and Nick clash, Chrysten enjoys time spent with the group without Chloe, and Abbie and Grant get closer.
139	4	"Family Reunion"	5 June 2018	0.540
The group in the Gold Coast get increasingly angry that there’s still no sign of the others, who are partying hard in Byron Bay. Sam and Sophie visit a fortune teller, and Nathan and Chloe come up with a revenge plan. When the gang are reunited, there’s fireworks as Chloe blows her fuse at Sam. Elsewhere Chrysten and Dee come to blows over a misunderstanding, and Abbie faces fresh upset after catching Grant seeking other girls. As Nick tries to take his girl back to an already engaged shag pad, Sam is livid with the disruption.
140	5	"The Next Step"	12 June 2018	0.489
Abbie fears that she’s turning into a psycho following yet another argument with Grant. Elsewhere, following a rough day at work Chrysten decides she’s had enough before leaving the villa for good. Chloe gives Sam a night he’ll never forget, and Dee is victim of a Geordie prank. Nathan gets emotional after receiving constant reminders of how much he’s missing his boyfriend, whilst Sophie and Alex share a shock kiss. Chloe decides to play cupid by seeking men for the single girls in the group, and Nick makes an embarrassing confession.
141	6	"The Shag Pad Invasion"	19 June 2018	0.450
The Geordie’s are far from impressed by their next job, whilst Nathan apologises for kicking off the night before. Abbie is left red faced when she sees Grant getting with somebody else at their first Australian house party. The next morning, news spreads of Grant’s shock decision to leave the house, but Alex is more concerned about Nathan’s feelings. Sam and Chloe rage with Alex when he misinterprets information, and Sophie seeks advice on Dee on how to pull an Aussie lad. Sam destroys the house after jumping to the wrong conclusion with Chloe.
142	7	"Look Who's Back"	26 June 2018	0.463
It’s the morning after the night before and Sam is left regretting his actions. In a bid to cheer everybody up, Nathan suggests go-karting but Abbie isn’t impressed. Sophie and Alex get increasingly closer following another boozy night, whilst Abbie fears she may be leading Nick on. Holly returns to the house to whip the workers back into shape. Sam loses his patience with Chloe once again when she says she wants to spend the night with the girls, which causes more drama for the couple. Elsewhere Holly is overcome with emotion after seeing Sam’s treatment of Chloe, reminding her of her past problems with Kyle.
143	8	"Queen Nathan's Birthday"	3 July 2018	0.517
Sam wakes up knowing he has a lot of apologising to do to Chloe once again. Sophie fears her feelings may be growing for Alex, whilst Sam and Chloe patch things up. Nathan plans a trip to the Outback for his birthday, but has one more request for the boys. Despite Nathan’s fear of horses, Chloe arranges a horse riding session for his birthday as a surprise. Elsewhere, when the group arrive at the Outback they’re far from impressed with the conditions they’re staying in – as Nathan announced that it’s his worst birthday ever. Making the most of a bad situation, Alex and Sophie take things to the next step.
144	9	"The New Geordie"	10 July 2018	0.433
It’s Dee’s birthday and to celebrate, the girls head to a strip club to learn some moves, however the boys gate-crashing leads to another bicker between Chloe and Sam. Sophie finally admits her feelings towards Alex, but he fears she’s only interested in him when she’s had a drink. The group return to the Gold Coast to find new Geordie Adam has moved in, who is an instant hit with the ladies. Dee wastes no time getting to grips with Adam, which leaves Abbie furious. Sophie and Alex give into temptation once more, whilst Dee and Abbie’s new found friendship hits the rocks as the pair have a violent showdown over Adam.
145	10	"Sam Busts His Hand"	17 July 2018	0.426
Abbie is full of regrets as she wakes up realising life’s too short to be arguing with her friends, whilst Sophie is happy about being in a good place with Alex. Dee and Abbie rekindle their friendship. Chloe is down in the dumps when Sam is forced to leave the house with an injury, whilst the house turns against Alex when he rejects Sophie after fearing he’s caught feelings for her. Dee confronts Adam when she hears he’s been bad mouthing her, Alex worms his way back into Sophie’s good books, and Chloe is depressed when she gets a taste of what life is like without Sam.
146	11	"Pride Party"	24 July 2018	0.467
Adam wants to apologise for the comments he made about Dee, but his attention is swaying towards Abbie instead. Nathan plans to host a Gay Pride house party, and Abbie’s Nana arrives as a special guest. Alex decides to play Sophie at her own game when he catches her receiving a lapdance from somebody else, but it has huge consequences when “Psycho Chloe” erupts as she defends her friend. Devastated by the events, Sophie takes her frustrations out on the villa instead. Elsewhere Sam returns from hospital, Sophie and Alex make peace, and Abbie receives a smooth from Adam.
147	12	"The Ultimate Food Fight"	31 July 2018	0.445
The Aussies take the Geordies to a boat party as a parting gift, where Sophie meets Alex’s friends for the first time. Adam continues to graft Abbie but she’s unsure on her feelings towards him. Elsewhere Chloe and Sam get each other’s names tattooed on them, and Alex and Sophie reminisce over their time spent together. Abbie begins to feel awkward as she tries to let Adam down gently, whilst Sophie is forced into an emotional goodbye with Alex as the Geordies head back home to Newcastle.

== Ratings ==
Episode	Date	Official MTV rating	MTV weekly rank	Official MTV+1 rating	Total MTV viewers
Episode 1	15 May 2018	433,000	1	13,000	446,000
Episode 2	22 May 2018	466,000	1	13,000	479,000
Episode 3	29 May 2018	462,000	1	6,000	468,000
Episode 4	5 June 2018	528,000	1	12,000	540,000
Episode 5	12 June 2018	476,000	1	13,000	489,000
Episode 6	19 June 2018	430,000	1	20,000	450,000
Episode 7	26 June 2018	442,000	1	21,000	463,000
Episode 8	3 July 2018	497,000	1	20,000	517,000
Episode 9	10 July 2018	427,000	1	6,000	433,000
Episode 10	17 July 2018	416,000	1	10,000	426,000
Episode 11	24 July 2018	456,000	1	11,000	467,000
Episode 12	31 July 2018	427,000	1	18,000	445,000
