= Geordie Shore series 9 =

Geordie Shore
- Series 9
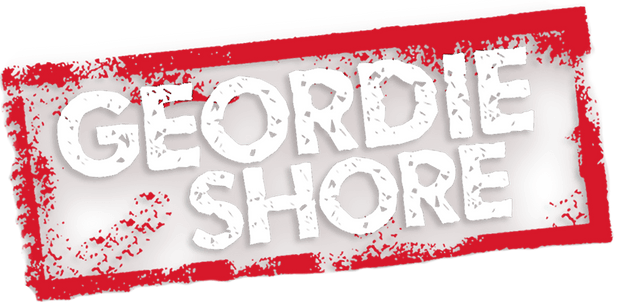
- No. of episodes: 8

Release
- Original network: MTV
- Original release: 28 October – 16 December 2014

Series chronology
- ← Previous; Series 8 Next → Series 10

The ninth series of Geordie Shore, a British television programme based in Newcastle upon Tyne, was confirmed on 12 July 2014, and began on 28 October 2014. It was also announced that the cast would travel to Paris and Somerset. All cast members from the previous series returned. Before the series launch, cast member Vicky Pattison announced that this would be her final series. She had appeared in the show since the first series.

== Cast ==
- Aaron Chalmers
- Charlotte-Letitia Crosby
- Gary Beadle
- Holly Hagan
- James Tindale
- Kyle Christie
- Marnie Simpson
- Scott Timlin
- Vicky Pattison

=== Duration of cast ===
Cast members
Cast members	1	2	3	4	5	6	7	8
Aaron								
Charlotte								
Gaz								
Holly								
James								
Kyle								
Marnie								
Scott								
Vicky								

= Cast member is featured in this episode.
= Cast member voluntarily leaves the house.
= Cast member leaves and returns to the house in the same episode.
= Cast member returns to the house.
= Cast member leaves the series.

== Episodes ==
No. overall	No. in season	Title	Original release date	Viewers (millions)
61	1	"Episode 1"	28 October 2014	0.991
There is a shock for the others when Vicky is promoted to team leader, or "Boss Vicky" as she soon becomes known. She chooses who goes to work, but will she be able to keep everyone in check, and will she punish anyone who steps out of line?
62	2	"Episode 2"	4 November 2014	0.889
Boss Vicky takes the team to run their first gay "Tash-on Tours" job, with great success. But everyone is concerned about Charlotte when she reveals she is not happy and that all is not well in her relationship with Mitch.
63	3	"Episode 3"	11 November 2014	0.907
They all go to France without Marnie who has not returned to the house after kissing Kyle at Holly's house party. Kyle is left to bear the brunt of the anger from the lads in Paris.
64	4	"Episode 4"	18 November 2014	0.925
Vicky is in trouble with Boss Anna after making a mess of the Tash on Tours job in Paris. As a punishment, Anna asks Vicky to make 200 origami swans for a Japanese-themed event. It is up to Vicky to make everyone work together to make them, but Marnie decides she cannot be bothered and sets herself on a collision course with Vicky.
65	5	"Episode 5"	25 November 2014	1.118
Marnie and Vicky's reconciliation is short lived when Vicky discovers Marnie has been lying to her all along. A Tash on Tours night in Charlotte's home town of Sunderland ends in disaster when Aaron sees Marnie and Scott being too close for his liking.
66	6	"Episode 6"	2 December 2014	0.798
The Geordies are going out of the Toon and into the country to host a Tash on Tours night at Lakefest in Gloucestershire. Charlotte and Gaz have their first real test when Charlotte spots Gaz flirting with a girl at the hoedown. Will she be able to hold back from turning into "Psycho Charlotte" and will Gaz be able to prove to her that he really has changed?
67	7	"Episode 7"	9 December 2014	0.912
The "boyfriend club" is well and truly up and running with Charlotte, Holly and Marnie all waking up in the boys' bedroom. Vicky is feeling left out and missing her boyfriend James so the gang arranges a surprise visit for her. Will this make Vicky feel happier in the house or remind her of what she is missing even more?
68	8	"Episode 8"	16 December 2014	0.947
Tis' the season to get Mortal! It is Christmas time in the Geordie Shore house and, like every other family Christmas, it is not without its festive finger-blasting, tantrums round the tree and mayhem under the mistletoe.

== Ratings ==
Episode	Date	Official MTV rating	MTV weekly rank	Official MTV+1 rating	Total MTV viewers
Episode 1	28 October 2014	892,000	1	99,000	991,000
Episode 2	4 November 2014	849,000	1	40,000	889,000
Episode 3	11 November 2014	853,000	1	54,000	907,000
Episode 4	18 November 2014	858,000	1	67,000	925,000
Episode 5	25 November 2014	1,015,000	1	103,000	1,118,000
Episode 6	2 December 2014	735,000	1	63,000	798,000
Episode 7	9 December 2014	841,000	1	71,000	912,000
Episode 8	16 December 2014	862,000	1	85,000	947,000
