= Geordie Shore series 16 =

Geordie Shore
- Series 16
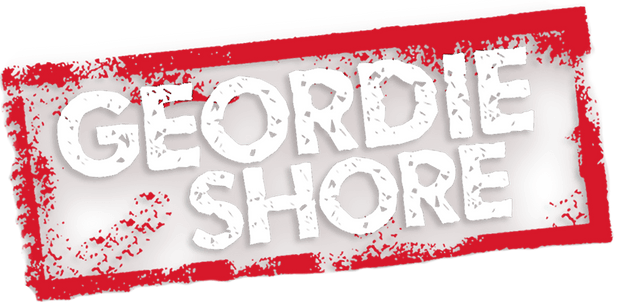
- No. of episodes: 10

Release
- Original network: MTV
- Original release: 9 January – 13 March 2018

Series chronology
- ← Previous; Series 15 Next → Series 17

The sixteenth series of Geordie Shore, a British television programme based in Newcastle Upon Tyne was filmed in September 2017 and began on 9 January 2018, and concluded after ten episodes on 13 March 2018. This is the first series not to include original cast member Gaz Beadle after he quit the show for personal reasons. New cast members for this series include Sam Gowland, who had previously appeared on the third series of Love Island, as well as Steph Snowdon. However it was later revealed that Steph had been axed from the show and would therefore not return for the seventeenth series.

During this series, cast members Aaron Chalmers and Marnie Simpson both announced that they'd quit the show – therefore this was their final series. The series focused heavily on the love triangle between Abbie, Chloe and Sam, before Chloe and Sam finally make their relationship official. It also included former flames Aaron and Marnie coming to terms with living in the house together whilst both in relationships outside of the house, as well as Sophie and Nathan's struggles without their other halves.

== Cast ==
- Aaron Chalmers
- Chloe Ferry
- Sam Gowland
- Nathan Henry
- Abbie Holborn
- Sophie Kasaei
- Marnie Simpson
- Steph Snowdon

=== Duration of cast ===
Cast members
Cast members	1	2	3	4	5	6	7	8	9	10
Aaron										
Abbie										
Chloe										
Marnie										
Nathan										
Sam										
Sophie										
Steph										

= Cast member is featured in this episode.
= Cast member arrives in the house.
= Cast member voluntarily leaves the house.
= Cast member is removed from the house.
= Cast member returns to the house.
= Cast member leaves the series.
= Cast member does not feature in this episode.

== Episodes ==
No. overall	No. in season	Title	Original release date	Viewers (millions)
126	1	"Parsnip Party"	9 January 2018	0.669
Anna recruits the Geordies back to the house where new boy Sam catches the eyes of both Chloe and Abbie. Marnie is left infuriated when Steph declares that she has unfinished business with Aaron, and Chloe and Abbie both compete for Sam’s affection. Aaron returns to the house with the announcement that Gaz won’t be returning, so the group decorate the house with parsnips in his honour. Things get awkward between Aaron and Marnie, and it’s Chloe who ends up in Sam’s bed.
127	2	"Chloe Confronts Abbie"	16 January 2018	0.715
The tension increases between Abbie and Chloe as the competition for Sam steps up a gear, whilst Aaron and Marnie are forced to explain themselves to Nathan after spending the night in bed together. Sam can’t believe his luck following a smooth with Abbie, leaving an angry Chloe lashing out. Chloe seeks advice from a loved one, whilst Nathan is annoyed by Aaron and Marnie isolating themselves. Elsewhere, Abbie is knocked for six when Chloe lays into her over her loyalties in the house.
128	3	"The Mams Come to Party"	23 January 2018	0.591
Abbie and Chloe both agree to take a step back from Sam, and Marnie plans to celebrate her birthday in style. Aaron becomes fed up of Nathan overanalysing his friendship with Marnie as she struggles to reassure her boyfriend Casey that nothing is going on between her and Aaron. As Nathan hits a nerve, Aaron is quick to bite. Elsewhere Anna sends the group to Tenerife but forbids Aaron from travelling with them, leaving Marnie with a difficult decision to make. Despite promising to stay away from Sam, Chloe ends up locking lips with him away from prying eyes.
129	4	"Chloe's First Date"	30 January 2018	0.605
Chloe feels bad for betraying Abbie so plans on telling her everything about her secret smooch with Sam, however someone else gets there first. Sam causes further ructions in the house after giving Abbie a proposition, leading to an alcohol fuelled confrontation. Elsewhere Sophie and Nathan give Sam some brutally honest home truths, and the group head to the water park to clear the tension. Despite agreeing to give Sam the cold shoulder, Chloe finds herself back in his bed.
130	5	"Tenerife Was a 10"	6 February 2018	0.660
Chloe is delighted when Sam agrees to take her on their first date but is left unimpressed by his chosen venue – up in the air. Abbie desperately tries to prove to herself that she’s over Sam by moving on with somebody else, whilst Sophie feels left out of the group. Back in Newcastle, Steph confesses to Nathan that she may have feelings for Aaron, and Sam asks Chloe out on a second date. Elsewhere Sophie misses having her cousin Marnie in the house, and a drunk Nathan starts a house food fight.
131	6	"Chicken Shop Date"	13 February 2018	0.605
Chloe is underwhelmed by her second date with Sam at a chicken shop. Sophie and Nathan both feel the strain as they confide in each other about missing their other halves, whilst Abbie tears up after feeling rejected by boys. Chloe upsets Sam following a misunderstanding with Abbie leaving Nathan to pick up the pieces, whilst Abbie goes on the pull in a bid to prove that she’s over Sam. Chloe vows to leave the house after an argument with Sam, meanwhile Nathan is left to look after Sophie after an eventful night out.
132	7	"The Girls Get Spiritual"	20 February 2018	0.666
Chloe decides to focus all of her energy on Sam and let nothing get in the way of them making a go of things, and Joel arrival puts a smile on Sophie’s face. Abbie enjoys the new positive vibes in the house, whilst Nathan gets in the way of Joel and Sophie’s night of passion. Steph is delighted when Aaron returns to the house. Chloe is left red faced when she catches Sam chatting up another girl, leading to a violent confrontation back at the house when she lashes out at him. Elsewhere, Aaron makes it clear to Steph that he’s not interested.
133	8	"The L Bomb"	27 February 2018	0.560
Marnie returns as Anna sends the group to Edinburgh, but puts Chloe on a drinking ban as punishment for her behaviour. Things get increasingly awkward between Chloe and Sam as both refuse to make the first move in sorting their differences out. Marnie questions Steph on her intentions with Aaron, whilst Chloe and Sam finally reach a good place in their relationship. Aaron and Marnie’s attempt to push Nathan’s buttons go too far when a personal comment leaves Nathan seething.
134	9	"Chloe's Barbers"	6 March 2018	TBA
Nathan is still annoyed with Marnie and demands an apology, but it takes Sophie to bring the bickering pair back together. Elsewhere Chloe’s insecurities prove a bump in the road for her and Sam, and Abbie relayed her fears to Steph. Sophie leaves the house to help out a family member in need, whilst Steph tells Chloe about Abbie’s private thoughts. Nathan takes the group golfing, and Steph and Abbie come to blows in Middlesbrough. Meanwhile, Sam and Chloe make their relationship official.
135	10	"The Toilet Trip"	13 March 2018	0.514
Abbie and Steph agree to put their argument behind them, whilst Anna splits the group up on their last day together. Sam treats Chloe to a date where he has an important question to ask her, and Aaron is honest with his feelings towards Marnie. The group participate in a huge food fight, where Chloe and Sam sneak off to have some fun of their own, meanwhile Nathan is concerned when Marnie and Aaron disappear in the toilet for a while. Aaron and Marnie are unimpressed by Nathan’s questions, and everyone leaves the house.

== Ratings ==
Episode	Date	Official MTV rating	MTV weekly rank	Official MTV+1 rating	Total MTV viewers
Episode 1	9 January 2018	632,000	1	37,000	669,000
Episode 2	16 January 2018	705,000	1	10,000	715,000
Episode 3	23 January 2018	550,000	1	41,000	591,000
Episode 4	30 January 2018	595,000	1	10,000	605,000
Episode 5	6 February 2018	630,000	1	30,000	660,000
Episode 6	13 February 2018	575,000	1	30,000	605,000
Episode 7	20 February 2018	635,000	1	31,000	666,000
Episode 8	27 February 2018	535,000	1	25,000	560,000
Episode 9	6 March 2018	437,000	1		
Episode 10	13 March 2018	477,000	1	37,000	514,000
