= Geordie Shore series 21 =

Geordie Shore
- Series 21
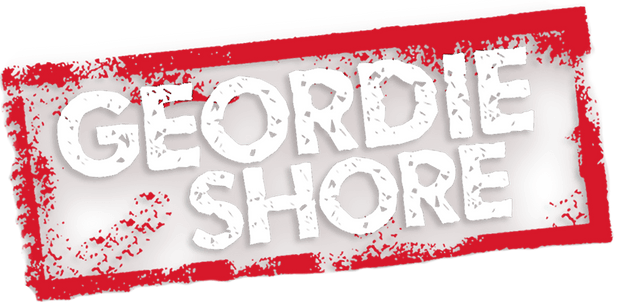
- No. of episodes: 8

Release
- Original network: MTV
- Original release: 28 July – 15 September 2020

Series chronology
- ← Previous; Series 20 Next → Series 22

The twenty-first series of Geordie Shore, a British television program based in Newcastle upon Tyne, began airing on 28 July 2020 and concluded following eight episodes on 15 September 2020. The series was due to begin earlier in the year, but due to the COVID-19 pandemic, production on the series was put on hiatus. Ahead of the series it was confirmed that three new cast members had joined the show, Ant Kennedy, Louis Shaw, and former The X Factor and Celebrity Big Brother contestant Amelia Lily. These replace former cast Sam Gowland and Tahlia Chung. During the series Nat Phillips and Beau Brennan made their final appearance.

== Cast ==
- Beau Brennan
- Chloe Ferry
- Nathan Henry
- Abbie Holborn
- Anthony Kennedy
- Bethan Kershaw
- Amelia Lily
- Natalie Phillips
- Louis Shaw
- James Tindale

=== Duration of cast ===
Cast members
Cast members	1	2	3	4	5	6	7	8
Abbie								
Amelia								
Ant								
Beau								
Bethan								
Chloe								
James								
Louis								
Nat								
Nathan								

= Cast member is featured in this episode.
= Cast member arrives in the house.
= Cast member voluntarily leaves the house.
= Cast member returns to the house.
= Cast member leaves the series.
= Cast member is not officially a cast member in this episode.

== Episodes ==
No. overall	No. in season	Title	Original release date	Viewers (millions)
178	1	"Get This Party Started!"	28 July 2020	0.262
The Geordies return to work where Abbie notices an instant spark between newbies Ant and Amelia. Bethan feels like Beau is prioritising his friendship with Nathan over her, whilst Abbie still feels tension around Chloe. Amelia considers making a move on Ant but soon realises she has competition when she spots him flirting with Chloe. Anna helps boost team morale by sending everybody Rage Buggying, Nat and Chloe enjoy the newly single life, and Bethan lashes out when Beau chooses to spend time with Nathan rather than go to bed with her.
179	2	"Family Friction!"	4 August 2020	0.202
Nathan receives déjà vu as he realises Chloe may be getting too attached to Ant. Abbie plays Cupid by encouraging Amelia and James to share a kiss, and Bethan is concerned by the lack of time Beau is spending with her. James admits he’s enjoying the single life and doesn’t want anything serious with Amelia, and Nathan takes Chloe out for a long overdue catch-up about her love life. Ant goes on the pull after seeing a different side of Chloe on a night out, and Nathan has no choice but to intervene when he feels her feelings of jealousy are ruining the group vibe.
180	3	"It's Fright Night!"	11 August 2020	0.260
Anna attempts to transform the Geordies into a classy and sophisticated bunch to entertain her friends. Beau begins to feel guilty about not spending much time with Bethan so organises the ultimate gesture to put a smile back on her face. Elsewhere Ant confides in James about fancying Chloe, but Nathan has already encouraged her to stay away from boys. There’s finally unity amongst the girls when Abbie and Chloe clear the air, meanwhile Amelia hopes for another kiss with James. It’s tit for tat as the boys go head-to-head against the girls in a series of drunken pranks.
181	4	"Hello New Lad!"	18 August 2020	0.238
Nathan returns to the house following a short break, leaving Bethan fearful that she will become second best to Beau once again. Anna shocks the group by bringing new arrival Louis into the mix, who has an instant connection with Chloe. Amelia is left red faced after being encouraged by the girls to make a move on James - only to catch him talking to other girls. Elsewhere, Ant relays his feelings to Chloe when he feels replaced by Louis, and Amelia steals a kiss at the house party. Beau fails to understand the support an emotional Bethan needs when she opens up to him.
182	5	"Big Mistake!"	25 August 2020	0.232
Ant takes on Louis as he feels mugged off regarding the Chloe situation. Bethan feels more neglected than ever by Beau and seeks advice from the girls. Louis flips when he catches Chloe apologising to Ant for the way she’s treated him, and forces her to make a choice. Elsewhere Nat struggles with being newly single, and Nathan senses Chloe is playing the boys off each other after she ditches Louis to spend the night with Ant. Chloe admits to the girls that she wants to give things another go with Louis – but she has no idea what awaits her at the club.
183	6	"See Ya, Nat!"	1 September 2020	0.299
Nathan tries to make Chloe understand that her actions towards Louis and Ant have consequences. Elsewhere Nat take a bold step by covering up a tattoo of her ex-girlfriend’s name in order to finally give herself some closure. Bethan is in a better mood for spending time away from Beau, whilst Louis continues to play hard to get with Chloe. The group reel when Nat tells them she’s leaving the house for good, Louis gives into temptation by sharing a kiss with Chloe, and Bethan and Beau reach the end of the line following a heart-to-heart.
184	7	"Chloe Changes Her Ways!"	8 September 2020	0.209
Bethan decides to take some time away from the house for the sake of her relationship with Beau, whilst Ant wastes no time in getting one over Louis by telling Chloe exactly what he’s been saying behind her back. Amelia sets her sights on James once again and gets the kiss she desires, and Ant apologises to Louis for throwing him under the bus. The boys worry that Louis is playing with fire after he kisses a girl at a strip class, leaving Nathan fearful of how Chloe might react when she finds out. Amelia confronts James for blanking her after their kiss, and Chloe puts on a brave front around Louis.
185	8	"Geordie-licious!"	15 September 2020	0.210
Before the Geordies head back home to their normal lives, Anna has one last job for everybody to go out with a bang. Chloe decides not to dwell on the past and continues to pursue Louis instead. Nathan has a surprise for the group as he unveils his alter ego Aphrodite, whilst Amelia performs her best-selling single, and Beau reflects on his time apart from Bethan. Chloe thanks Louis for making her feel wanted again, Amelia is grateful to the family for making her feel welcomed, and Bethan returns to take back her man.

== Ratings ==
Episode	Date	MTV weekly rank	Total MTV viewers
Episode 1	28 July 2020	1	262,000
Episode 2	4 August 2020	1	202,000
Episode 3	11 August 2020	1	260,000
Episode 4	18 August 2020	1	238,000
Episode 5	25 August 2020	1	232,000
Episode 6	1 September 2020	1	299,000
Episode 7	8 September 2020	1	209,000
Episode 8	15 September 2020	1	210,000
Average viewers		1	239,000
