= Geordie Shore series 20 =

Geordie Shore
- Series 20
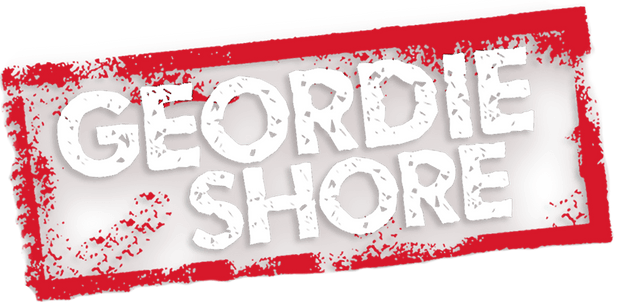
- No. of episodes: 10

Release
- Original network: MTV
- Original release: 29 October – 24 December 2019

Series chronology
- ← Previous; Series 19 Next → Series 21

The twentieth series of Geordie Shore, a British television programme based in Newcastle upon Tyne began airing on 29 October 2019 and concluded on 24 December 2019 following ten episodes. After the departures of Holly Hagan, Scott Timlin, Sophie Kasaei from the previous series, it was confirmed that former cast members Abbie Holborn and James Tindale would be returning to the show as their replacements. Filming locations include a trip to the Algarve in Portugal. As well as this, former cast member Adam Guthrie made regular appearances throughout. This series was also the last to feature Sam Gowland and Tahlia Chung.

== Cast ==
- Beau Brennan
- Tahlia Chung
- Chloe Ferry
- Abbie Holborn
- Sam Gowland
- Nathan Henry
- Bethan Kershaw
- Natalie Phillips
- James Tindale

=== Duration of cast ===
Cast members
Cast members	1	2	3	4	5	6	7	8	9	10
Abbie										
Beau										
Bethan										
Chloe										
James										
Nat										
Nathan										
Sam										
Tahlia										

= Cast member is featured in this episode.
= Cast member voluntarily leaves the house.
= Cast member leaves and returns to the house in the same episode.
= Cast member returns to the house.
= Cast member leaves the series.
= Cast member returns to the series.
= Cast member features in this episode, but is outside of the house.
= Cast member does not feature in this episode.

== Episodes ==
No. overall	No. in season	Title	Original release date	Viewers (millions)
168	1	"Shake Ups & Break Ups!"	29 October 2019	0.239
The Geordies return to the house with a different dynamic following Sam and Chloe’s split, and the rest worry how it’ll effect group situations. James is delighted to be back where he belongs, and Bethan is nervous when Abbie returns. Beau jumps to the wrong conclusion when he accuses Bethan of flirting with James, whilst Sam and Chloe feel awkward around each other. Beau soon realises he was in the wrong as he apologises to Bethan, but she tells him she needs space. Elsewhere Tahlia and James share a kiss, and Sam dreads an imminent conversation with Chloe.
169	2	"Give It Another Go!"	5 November 2019	0.311
Chloe wonders whether coming back to the house with Sam was the right thing to do, whilst Beau fixes his problems with Bethan. The group host another wild house party where Tahlia and James grow closer, and Chloe breaks down due to the on-going tension between her and Sam. Elsewhere, Abbie admits to feeling awkward around Bethan due to their shady past. Chloe and Sam leave the house to discuss their future, and return to announce they’re going to give their relationship another go. Chloe sees red when she doesn’t get the support she expected from the other girls.
170	3	"Tensions Keep Rising"	12 November 2019	0.330
Following the drama from the night before, Chloe refuses to speak to any of the girls for not having her back, whilst Sam asks the boys to respect his relationship. Bethan worries that Chloe has made the wrong decision by getting back with Sam, and she begins to see it for herself when he gives her no attention on a night out. Nathan gives Chloe and Sam an ultimatum for one of them to leave the house in order for the situation to be resolved but neither are willing to move out. Meanwhile Tahlia feels awkward when James brings a girl back, and Abbie confesses a secret to James about her time with Chloe in Ibiza.
171	4	"Party in Portugal"	19 November 2019	0.369
As Anna sends the group off to Portugal, Sam stays at home after realising it’s the perfect opportunity to give Chloe the space she needs. Bethan tries to squash the issue with Abbie but it’s a case of keeping her enemies closer when she admits she still doesn’t trust her around Beau. Chloe drowns her sorrows in the Algarve as she attempts to move on from Sam, whilst Tahlia and James end up in bed together again. Bethan unleashes her fury at Abbie when she catches her having an innocent conversation with Beau, and a distressed Chloe cries herself to sleep thinking about Sam.
172	5	"Agg on the Algarve"	26 November 2019	0.344
Tahlia wastes no time friendzoning James when she realises there’s no chemistry between them. Bethan and Abbie’s fallout causes an unfriendly atmosphere within the group leaving Nathan no choice but to intervene. Elsewhere Nat causes ructions by accusing Abbie of flirting with her, and labels Bethan’s relationship with Beau toxic. When Anna orders the gang to pack their bags and return home Abbie and Bethan finally call a truce for the sake of the family, Nat considers leaving after seeing the upset caused from the night before, and Beau is let in on Chloe’s secret betrayal.
173	6	"Fun at the Fair!"	3 December 2019	0.257
The Geordies head back to Newcastle where Chloe dreads a reunion with Sam. Nat decides to spend time with her girlfriend when the pressure of living in the house gets too much for her, and Beau asks Bethan to be his girlfriend. Bethan becomes increasingly jealous of Nat as Chloe sings her praises in a taxi home – and it all explodes when she decides to get things off her chest. Tahlia is spoilt for choice when James and Adam go head-to-head for her attention, Nathan visits Sam to see where his head’s at, and James contemplates exposing the truth about Ibiza.
174	7	"Geordies Do the Great Outdoors!"	10 December 2019	0.205
Chloe leaves the house to spend the night back at home with Sam in another attempt at mending their broken relationship. Nathan begins an online relationship but is nervous about meeting him for the first time, and Tahlia and James realise they’re much happier as friends. Chloe and Sam return after patching things up, Nathan plans a camping trip for the boys whilst Bethan plans a sophisticated day out for the girls. Chloe’s Mum questions Bethan on what she thinks of Chloe and Sam’s situation, and James tells Abbie that Sam needs to know the truth about Chloe.
175	8	"Breaking Point"	17 December 2019	0.238
James finally takes matters into his own hands and tells Sam the truth about Ibiza. Chloe is devastated when Sam puts her on the spot by questioning her about the kiss, but she’s quick to point the finger at Abbie for ruining her relationship. Abbie is racked with guilt when Sam demands the whole truth from her, whilst Bethan plans a birthday surprise for Beau. Following a night of intense drama, Sam calls it a day on his relationship with Chloe and leaves the house for good. Elsewhere, the group prepare for Beau’s birthday party, and Chloe follows her heart.
176	9	"Beau's Birthday!"	24 December 2019	0.250
James and Beau arrange a surprise for Nathan by inviting the boy he’s been speaking to online to the house party. Bethan gives Beau a birthday he won’t forget, whilst Abbie is shocked by her Nana’s behaviour at the party. Nathan is over the moon by how his night with Tommy went, and Anna sends James and Beau on a “Butlers in the Buff” job for a very special client – Abbie’s Nana. James admits the group dynamics are better without Chloe and Sam’s turbulent relationship in the house, but Abbie is scared it’s all going to go downhill when Chloe makes her imminent return.
177	10	"Serious Send Off!"	24 December 2019	0.248
Abbie is far from impressed by Chloe’s return to the house, but Bethan is over the moon to see her friend. As the group begin planning their final night on the town, Nathan decides to invite Tommy, whilst Sam decides to give it a miss for the sake of the family. Chloe heads home early after coming to a realisation regarding her relationship with Sam, and Nathan is disappointed when Tommy goes back to Amsterdam. Following one last crazy night, Beau, James and Nathan release their inner child and built a fort to sleep in. Nathan suggests they all set goals for next time.

== Ratings ==
Episode	Date	MTV weekly rank	Total MTV viewers
Episode 1	29 October 2019	2	239,000
Episode 2	5 November 2019	2	311,000
Episode 3	12 November 2019	1	330,000
Episode 4	19 November 2019	1	369,000
Episode 5	26 November 2019	1	344,000
Episode 6	3 December 2019	1	257,000
Episode 7	10 December 2019	2	205,000
Episode 8	17 December 2019	1	238,000
Episode 9	24 December 2019	1	250,000
Episode 10	24 December 2019	2	246,000
Average viewers		1	279,000
