= Geordie Shore series 15 =

Geordie Shore
- Series 15
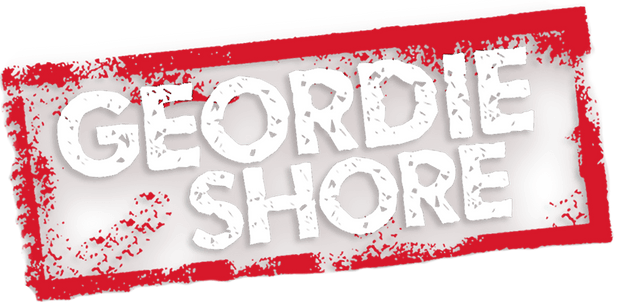
- No. of episodes: 9

Release
- Original network: MTV
- Original release: 29 August – 17 October 2017

Season chronology
- ← Previous; Series 14 Next → Series 16

The fifteenth series of Geordie Shore, a British television programme based in Newcastle upon Tyne, was confirmed on 8 August 2017 when a teaser video was released. The series began on 29 August 2017, and concluded after nine episodes on 17 October 2017. This was the final series to include Scotty T and Marty McKenna after they were both axed from the show, as well as original cast member Gaz Beadle following his decision to quit. The series also featured the brief return of Elettra Lamborghini, when the cast jetted off to Rome. The series included further twists in Aaron and Marnie's turbulent relationship, a newly single Gaz getting cosy with Abbie, as well as Chloe and Nathan's friendship facing its biggest strain to date. It also features the group visiting Rome, and Aaron taking part in his debut MMA fight in Birmingham.

== Cast ==
- Gaz Beadle
- Aaron Chalmers
- Elettra Lamborghini
- Chloe Ferry
- Nathan Henry
- Abbie Holborn
- Sophie Kasaei
- Marty McKenna
- Marnie Simpson
- Scotty T

=== Duration of cast ===
Cast members
Cast members	1	2	3	4	5	6	7	8	9
Aaron									
Abbie									
Chloe									
Elettra									
Gaz									
Marnie									
Marty									
Nathan									
Scott									
Sophie									

= Cast member is featured in this episode.
= Cast member voluntarily leaves the house.
= Cast member returns to the house.
= Cast member returns to the series.
= Cast member leaves the series.
= Cast member is removed from the series.
= Cast member features in this episode, but is outside of the house.
= Cast member does not feature in this episode.
= Cast member is not officially a cast member in this episode.

=== Off screen exits ===
- During the fifth episode, Anna announced that Marty and Scotty T had been removed from the house, and would not be returning for the remainder of the series. This led to the eventual departure of Marty and Scotty T from the show.

== Episodes ==
No. overall	No. in season	Title	Original release date	Viewers (millions)
117	1	"A Wasted Night In"	29 August 2017	0.716
The group return to the house, but Chloe is hiding a big secret from Marty. After noticing a connection between Abbie and Marty, Chloe gives them the green light to get with each other. Nathan is shocked to learn that Chloe has tried it on with Marty, and feels he can no longer defend his best friend. Elsewhere Abbie puts herself on a plate for Scott but gets nowhere, and Aaron leaves the house to focus on his MMA fight. Witnessing first hand Chloe’s treatment of Marty, Nathan loses his temper but ends up making matters worse.
118	2	"Dropping Like Flies"	5 September 2017	0.604
The atmosphere between Chloe and Nathan increases as Marty tries to bring the pair back together. Scott is forced to leave the house as his back pain becomes too much, whilst Abbie proves she doesn’t need him to have a good time by kissing another boy. Nathan sees a side to Marty he doesn’t like and is quick to jump to Chloe’s defence again, but when the group become fed up of the on-going arguing in the house, they feel it’s best to confront the situation head on. Chloe packs her bags and leaves after feeling that nobody is supporting her.
119	3	"Gary's News"	12 September 2017	0.687
Marty apologises to Chloe before bringing her back to the house, whilst Marnie visits Aaron to show her support to him before his big fight. Abbie is frustrated when Scott returns to the house and doesn’t even acknowledge her, so seeks comfort in the girls. Gaz is back with news that he’s now single and already has his sights set on Abbie, meanwhile Marty notices a connection between Marnie and Scott. As Marty gives Scott a warning about overstepping the boundaries, a fight erupts in the club, and Chloe proves she has got will power.
120	4	"Fight Night"	19 September 2017	0.567
The group head to Birmingham for Aaron’s fight but Marnie gets emotional, but after seeing him in action she realises she likes him a lot more than she thought she did. Abbie is jealous when Scott brings a girl back to the hotel. Back in Newcastle with Scott and Marty nowhere to be seen, Aaron is delighted by the welcome home party he’s received. Gaz makes it his mission to get with Abbie, whilst Marnie and Aaron finally give into temptation, and the gang have a naked food fight.
121	5	"Arrivederci Newcastle"	26 September 2017	0.544
Anna shocks the group by announcing that Scott and Marty won’t be returning to the house, before sending them all to Rome. Marnie and Aaron go on a date as the pair reveal that they’re happy with the way things are between them, whilst Abbie is delighted when Gaz continues to flirt with her. Elettra returns to the house and instantly catches Gaz’s eye, leaving the girls no choice but to interfere to make sure it’s Abbie who ends up in Gaz’s bed and not Elettra.
122	6	"Chloe's Challenge"	3 October 2017	0.487
Gaz plans a day trip out, where he decides he wants to focus his energy on Abbie rather than random girls. Realising that Chloe’s kick offs are ruining the group dynamics, Gaz nominates Nathan to speak to her about her attitude, however it all ends in disaster when their private chat turns into an argument. Elettra waves goodbye as the group return home to Newcastle, where Abbie gives into temptation once again and ends up in bed with Gaz. Marnie and Aaron’s flirting doesn’t go unnoticed by Sophie, whilst Nathan and Chloe fail to clear the air.
123	7	"The Triple Date"	10 October 2017	0.541
Aaron makes it clear to Gaz that he wants things to progress into a relationship with Marnie, but he’s unaware that she just wants to keep things casual. Nathan and Chloe finally fix the rift in their friendship, and Abbie plays Gaz at his own game. After worrying where her relationship with Joel is going, she receives a shock when he arrives in Newcastle with a surprise for her. Aaron is upset to hear the truth from Marnie, and the pair’s latest clash leaves Aaron in A&E.
124	8	"Has Gary Met His Match?"	17 October 2017	0.464
Aaron gives Marnie a heartfelt apology before preparing for their baby themed house party, and James makes a surprise return for the occasion. Gaz and Abbie compete to make each other jealous when their attention turns to other people, whilst Marnie gives Aaron a birthday present he’ll never forget. Abbie gives Gaz the green light to get with somebody else, before jumping into bed with his best friend. Elsewhere Marnie puts a drunk Aaron to bed, where he tells her three little words.
125	9	"Couples Counselling"	17 October 2017	0.371
A furious Anna punishes Aaron, Gaz and Marnie for skipping work. Gaz forces Marnie to be honest with Aaron about her feelings, but their conversation ends in disaster as the pair clash once again. Abbie admits she’s happy with where things are between her and Gaz, whilst Sophie gives Marnie some tough love. Elsewhere Marnie and Aaron have a heart-to-heart, and the group get emotional as they leave the house.

== Ratings ==
Episode	Date	Official MTV rating	MTV weekly rank	Official MTV+1 rating	Total MTV viewers
Episode 1	29 August 2017	710,000	1	6,000	716,000
Episode 2	5 September 2017	594,000	1	10,000	604,000
Episode 3	12 September 2017	659,000	1	28,000	687,000
Episode 4	19 September 2017	547,000	1	20,000	567,000
Episode 5	26 September 2017	509,000	1	35,000	544,000
Episode 6	3 October 2017	471,000	1	16,000	487,000
Episode 7	10 October 2017	506,000	1	35,000	541,000
Episode 8	17 October 2017	410,000	1	54,000	464,000
Episode 9	17 October 2017	357,000	2	14,000	371,000
