= Geordie Shore =

English television series

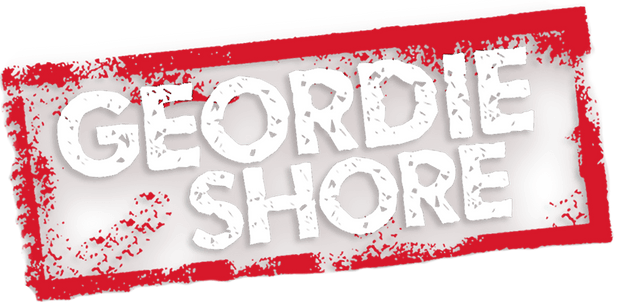
- Genre: Documentary
- Created by: MTV UK
- Starring: List of cast members
- Country of origin: England
- Original language: English / Geordie
- No. of series: 26 (plus 2 mini-series)
- No. of episodes: 235 (list of episodes)

Production
- Executive producers: Suzanne Readwin; Steven Regan; Carolyn Reynolds; Kerry Taylor; Tony Wood; Michael James Dunleavy
- Running time: 42 minutes
- Production companies: Lime Pictures; Objective Entertainment

Original release
- Network: MTV UK
- Release: 24 May 2011 – 4 March 2025
- Network: Paramount+
- Release: 9 January 2024 – present

Related
- Geordie Shore OGs

Geordie Shore is a British documentary television series broadcast on MTV. It debuted on 24 May 2011, and is the British spin-off of the American series Jersey Shore. Set in Newcastle upon Tyne, the show follows the daily lives of a group of young participants. As of 2026, Geordie Shore has aired 26 series, making it one of MTV’s longest-running reality formats. Episodes have also been released on Paramount+ in the United Kingdom alongside MTV UK.

== Broadcast ==
The series originally aired on MTV UK and is also available through MTV’s digital platforms. Since 2022, episodes have been distributed via Paramount+ in the United Kingdom.

== Reception ==
Geordie Shore has attracted both popularity and criticism. A 2011 review in The Metro described the programme as "car crash television" but noted its entertainment value. In 2013, a group of local councillors in Newcastle criticised the programme for its portrayal of the city’s nightlife. Academic analysis has also discussed the show’s role in shaping perceptions of regional identity and youth culture.

== Series ==
Year	Series	Predominant location	Episodes	Average MTV viewers
2011	Series 1	Newcastle, England	6	631,000
2011	Magaluf Madness	Magaluf, Spain	2	477,000
2012	Series 2	Newcastle, England	8	617,000
2012	Series 3	Cancún, Mexico	8	882,000
2012	Series 4	Newcastle, England	8	994,000
2013	Series 5	Newcastle, England and Europe	8	908,000
2013	Series 6	Sydney, Australia	8	1,038,000
2013	Series 7	Newcastle, England	6	1,040,000
2014	Series 8	Newcastle, England	8	1,075,000
2014	Series 9	Newcastle, England	8	936,000
2015	Series 10	Newcastle, England	8	900,000
2015	Series 11	Zante, Greece	10	1,149,000
2016	Series 12	Newcastle, England	8	1,237,000
2016	Big Birthday Battle	Newcastle, England	6	1,195,000
2016	Series 13	Various	10	952,000
2017	Series 14	Newcastle, England	12	867,000
2017	Series 15	Newcastle, England	9	553,000
2018	Series 16	Newcastle, England	10	602,000
2018	Series 17	Gold Coast, Australia	12	469,000
2018	Series 18	Newcastle, England	10	416,000
2019	Series 19	Newcastle, England	10	355,200
2019	Series 20	Newcastle, England	10	278,920
2020	Series 21	Newcastle, England	8	239,000
2021	Series 22	Newcastle, England	10	131,000
2022	The Reunion	Various	10	—N/a
2024	Series 24	Various	10	—N/a
2025	Series 25	Ko Samui, Thailand	10	—N/a
2026	Series 26	Various	10	—N/a

=== Series 1 (2011) ===
The first series of the show began airing on 24 May 2011 and concluded on 28 June 2011, consisting of six episodes. It was then followed by a reunion show hosted by Russell Kane where the cast discussed the series in front of an audience. This episode aired on 5 July 2011, and was followed by a Best Bits special which counted down the best moments from the first series in an episode airing 12 July 2011. The series included the turbulent relationship of Holly (who entered the house three days late) and Dan coming to an end, the beginning of Gaz and Charlotte's ongoing love/hate relationship, and Jay and Vicky's rocky relationship. In June 2011, two summer specials based in Magaluf were announced. These episodes aired from 23 August 2011 to 30 August 2011. This was the only series to feature Greg Lake.

=== Series 2 (2012) ===
The second series of the show began airing on 31 January 2012 and concluded on 20 March 2012, consisting of eight episodes. Like the first series, this series included a reunion special and a Best Bits special episode. The series was confirmed on 15 August 2011 when Geordie Shore was recommissioned for a second series with an extended eight-episode run. After the Magaluf specials, Greg Lake announced he was leaving the show. Rebecca Walker and Ricci Guarnaccio were cast as replacements. The series featured Sophie and Joel's rocky relationship coming to an end, Vicky being torn between her boyfriend Dan and new cast member Ricci, Charlotte admitting she'd finally had enough of seeing Gaz with other girls, and the beginning of Holly and James. For series two the cast moved from their home in Jesmond to a new house in a converted warehouse on the outskirts of the city.

=== Series 3 (2012) ===
The third series of the show began airing on 26 June 2012 and concluded on 14 August 2012, consisting of eight episodes. After the run of episodes, two Best Bits episodes aired counting down the series' top 10 moments. Series 3 began filming in early March and aired on MTV in June, it was later confirmed by cast member Gary Beadle via Twitter. The series is therefore also known as Chaos in Cancun. This is the last series to include cast members Rebecca Walker and Jay Gardner, who both departed during the final episode. This series included Holly and James growing closer when James broke his leg, and more bickering and flirting between Gaz and Charlotte.

=== Series 4 (2012) ===
The fourth series of the show began airing on 6 November 2012 and concluded on 18 December 2012, consisting of eight episodes. For the first time this series there was no special episodes counting down the best bits. This was the first series to feature new cast members Daniel Thomas-Tuck and Scott Timlin. The series included Vicky and Ricci's ongoing arguments continuing to the point of the engagement being temporarily called off, James leaving Holly distraught by the announcement of him having a girlfriend, and a huge bust-up between Vicky and Sophie which had the whole house divided. During the series, on 11 November 2012, the cast made guest appearances during the 2012 MTV Europe Music Awards where they presented the award for Best Male, which Justin Bieber won.

=== Series 5 (2013) ===
The fifth series of the show began airing on 19 February 2013 and concluded on 16 April 2013, consisting of eight episodes. The series was followed by another Best Bits episode airing 16 April 2013. The series was confirmed on 10 January 2013 when MTV announced that the fifth series of Geordie Shore would follow the cast in several locations across Europe including Amsterdam, Barcelona, Prague and Tignes. Filming for Series 5 began on 14 November 2012, as confirmed by several cast members on Twitter, and concluded in December. This was the final series to include cast members Daniel Thomas-Tuck and Ricci.

=== Series 6 (2013) ===
The sixth series of the show began airing on 9 July 2013 and concluded on 27 August 2013, consisting of eight episodes. The series was officially announced on 25 February 2013 when it was revealed the series would be located in Sydney and would air in summer 2013. Filming for this series began on 2 April as confirmed by cast member Gaz on Twitter. However, Charlotte was absent from the beginning of filming and joined the remaining cast on 7 April. The series featured a one-off return of former cast member Jay Gardner. During the series, Charlotte entered the Celebrity Big Brother house to compete in the twelfth series of the show and eventually won on 14 September 2013.

=== Series 7 (2013) ===
The seventh series of the show began airing on 17 September 2013 and concluded on 22 October 2013, consisting of six episodes. Shooting was suspended when Holly and Vicky were both arrested on a night out for assault during filming. On 12 July 2013, Sophie was axed from the show after exhibiting offensive behaviour on the night when Holly and Vicky were arrested. Holly Hagan was cleared on 21 August 2013. Marnie Simpson, the cousin of Sophie, joined the show for this season. Jay Gardner also made another one-off return during this series. After the series, on 15 December 2013, in a bid to reach Christmas number one, Gaz released his debut single which features vocals from The Risk, who previously featured in the eighth series of The X Factor.

=== Series 8 (2014) ===
The eighth series of the show began airing on 22 July 2014 and concluded on 9 September 2014, consisting of eight episodes. The series was confirmed on 22 October 2013 when Holly indicated that Series 7 was not the last and that another series would be filmed. Filming began for the series on 25 March 2014, and featured two new cast members, Aaron Chalmers and Kyle Christie. During the series, Ricci entered the Celebrity Big Brother house to participate in the fourteenth series. He followed in the footsteps of fellow cast member Charlotte who won the series in 2013. However he was evicted in a double eviction just two days before the final on 10 September. Ahead of the series, in 2014, Charlotte landed her own TV series, which aired on TLC. It was also revealed that had Vicky joined the cast of Ex on the Beach. She was later joined by fellow Geordie Shore cast member Ricci as well as Australian fling Dan Conn who briefly appeared in the sixth series of the show.

=== Series 9 (2014) ===
The ninth series of the show began airing on 28 October 2014 and concluded on 16 December 2014, consisting of eight episodes. On 15 May 2014, Gaz confirmed that the ninth series would be filmed in July/August 2014 and hinted at it being abroad. However the series remained in Newcastle. A new trailer confirmed that Vicky would be in charge, taking the role of 'Queen V' upon its return. On 28 October 2014, ahead of the Series 9 premiere, Vicky announced that this series would be her last.

=== Series 10 (2015) ===
The tenth series of the show began airing on 7 April 2015 and concluded on 26 May 2015, consisting of eight episodes. The series of the show was also confirmed on 1 November 2014 when it was revealed by Gary Beadle that filming had commenced. On 17 November 2014, MTV announced the tenth series would be James' last series. The tenth series added two new cast members, Chloe Ferry and Nathan Henry.

=== Series 11 (2015) ===
The eleventh series was announced on 23 May 2015 when MTV renewed the series for a further three series. The show began on 20 October 2015 and concluded on 22 December 2015. This was the first series not to include original cast member James Tindale after he departed at the start of the previous series.

Series 11 was shot in Greece. At 10 episodes, it was the longest season to date. Cast member Kyle Christie departed the series after four seasons. The cast had traveled to Zante, Malia, Ios, Santorini, Mykonos, and Athens for the series.

=== Series 12 (2016) ===
Series 12 was filmed in October and November 2015 and began airing on 15 March 2016. It was the first series to include new cast members Chantelle Connelly and Marty McKenna, who had previously appeared on the third series of Ex on the Beach. Marnie Simpson would also rejoin for the twelfth series having left at the end of the previous series.

=== Big Birthday Battle (2016) ===
On 12 February 2016, MTV announced that cast members, past and present, would be reuniting for a mini-series to celebrate five years of the show. The series would be a six-part special and would begin on 10 May 2016. All of the current cast members would return, as well as former cast members Daniel Thomas-Tuck, James Tindale, Jay Gardner, Kyle Christie, Ricci Guarnaccio, and Sophie Kasaei. The series also featured the show's 100th episode.

On 1 June 2016, original cast member Charlotte Crosby quit the show, making the Birthday Battle her final series.

=== Series 13 (2016) ===
Series 13 was shot in June and July 2016 and began on 25 October 2016. This series featured the return of former cast members Sophie Kasaei and Kyle Christie, who previously made a brief return during the Big Birthday Battle anniversary series. This series was filmed on various party islands including Kavos, Ibiza and Magaluf. On 24 June 2016, it was reported that Chantelle Connelly had quit the show halfway through filming, resulting in this series being her final one. On 27 September 2016, the previous reports were confirmed with the announcement that Chantelle Connelly had quit the show mid-series. It was also later announced that this would be Holly Hagan's last series after she quit in the series finale, along with Kyle Christie.

=== Series 14 (2017) ===
The fourteenth series was confirmed on 31 October 2016 when Scotty T announced that he would be taking a break from the series to focus on other commitments. The series was filmed in November 2016, and began airing on 28 March 2017. Ahead of the series, it was also confirmed that original cast member Holly had quit the show, following her exit in the previous series.

Eight new cast members joined for this series: Zahida Allen, Chelsea Barber, Sam Bentham, Sarah Goodhart, Abbie Holborn, Elettra Lamborghini, Billy Phillips and Eve Shannon. Goodhart and Allen both previously appeared on Ex on the Beach, with the former appearing on the third series of the show as the ex-girlfriend of current cast member Marty (before he joined the cast). Lamborghini has also appeared on Super Shore and participated in the fifth season of Gran Hermano VIP, the Spanish version of Celebrity Big Brother.

=== Series 15 (2017) ===
The fifteenth series was confirmed on 8 August 2017 when a teaser video was released. The series began on 29 August 2017, and concluded after nine episodes on 17 October 2017. This was the final series to include Scotty T and Marty McKenna after they were both axed from the show, as well as original cast member Gaz Beadle following his decision to quit. The series also featured the brief return of Elettra Lamborghini, when the cast jetted off to Rome. It also features Aaron taking part in his debut MMA fight in Birmingham. Former cast member James Tindale made a one-off return during the eighth episode of the series.

=== Series 16 (2018) ===
The sixteenth series was filmed in September 2017 and began on 9 January 2018, and concluded after ten episodes on 13 March 2018. New cast members for this series include Sam Gowland, who had previously appeared on the third series of Love Island, as well as Steph Snowdon. However it was later revealed that Steph had been axed from the show and would therefore not return for the seventeenth series. During this series, cast members Aaron Chalmers and Marnie Simpson both announced that they'd quit the show – therefore this was their final series.

=== Series 17 (2018) ===
The seventeenth series of the show was filmed in February 2018 and began on 15 May 2018. The series was filmed in Australia rather than Newcastle, making this the second series to be filmed here following the sixth series in 2013. Former cast member Holly Hagan returned to the show in this series.

Six new cast members joined the series: Grant Molloy, Adam Guthrie, and four Australians: Alexander MacPherson, Nick Murdoch, Dee Nguyen, and Chrysten Zenoni.

=== Series 18 (2018) ===
The eighteenth series of the show was filmed in July 2018 and began airing on 16 October 2018. This was the first series to include new cast member Faith Mullen. Original cast members Holly Hagan and James Tindale returned to the series along with Kyle Christie as part-time cast members, Scotty T also returned as Anna's deputy.

=== Series 19 (2019) ===
The nineteenth series of the show was confirmed in January 2019 when it was announced that filming had already begun. It began airing in March 2019. Abbie Holborn and Adam Guthrie returned to the show on a part – time basis. It also included four new cast members; Beau Brennan, Tahlia Chung, Bethan Kershaw, and Natalie Phillips. They replaced former cast member Faith Mullen who did not return to the show.

=== Series 20 (2019) ===
The twentieth series of the show began airing on 29 October 2019. Former cast members James Tindale and Abbie Holburn returned to the series as full-time cast members, while mainstays of the show Holly Hagan, Sophie Kasaei and Scotty T departed the show as series regulars.

=== Series 21 (2020) ===
The twenty-first series of the show began filming in October 2019, it was slated to premiere in April 2020, but due to the COVID-19 pandemic, production on the series was put on hiatus due to restrictions put in place by the UK government, the country where filming is taking place. The X Factor singer and former Celebrity Big Brother housemate Amelia Lily is confirmed to have joined the cast alongside fellow newcomers Anthony Kennedy and Louis Shaw. Sam Gowland and Tahlia Chung are the cast members from series twentieth not to return to the show.

=== Series 22 (2021) ===
The twenty second series of the show entitled Geordie Shore: Hot Single Summer, began filming in Newcastle in June 2021, and ended in the same month. The announcement of this series replaced the planned tenth anniversary reunion series to be set in Colombia after it was delayed from November 2020 to January 2021 before being axed altogether due to travel restrictions. Due to the COVID-19 and continued UK restrictions, the cast had to quarantine for ten days before filming began. The series marks the return of former cast-member Marty McKenna who was axed during fifteenth series as part of the shows new format which sees current cast members attempt to find love from a group of singletons and choose matches to join them in the house.

=== Series 23 (2022) ===
On 23 August 2022 MTV first announced Geordie Shore: The Reunion Series, which premiered on 20 September. The ten year reunion special of the show began filming in April 2022 after being delayed several times since 2020 due to COVID-19. All of the current cast members would return, as well as former cast members Aaron Chalmers, Chantelle Connelly, Charlotte Crosby, Holly Hagan, James Tindale, Jay Gardner, Kyle Christie, Marnie Simpson, Ricci Guarnaccio, Scott Timlin, Sophie Kasaei and Zahida Allen. The series also featured the show's 200th episode.

=== Series 24 (2024) ===
The twenty-fourth season was officially announced on 6 December 2023, and was filmed between February and July at a mansion in Cyprus. Features most of the cast members who returned during the reunion series. The show premiered on 9 January 2024.

=== Series 25 (2025) ===
The twenty-fifth season of Geordie Shore premiered on 7 January 2025. In May 2024, filming for a new season began at the W Koh Samui resort on the island of Ko Samui, Thailand. Charlotte Crosby announced her departure from the show last season. Before the premiere, the return of Scott Timlin was confirmed.

=== Series 26 (2026) ===
The twenty-sixth season of Geordie Shore premiered on 13 January 2026. The cast took a trip to Lisbon, where the return of original cast member Gaz Beadle, as well as Aaron Chalmers, was announced.

=== Series 27 ===
The twenty-seventh season of Geordie Shore was confirmed in May 2026 by Paramount+. Filming took place in Paris and Bourgogne, France, and included several locations in different cities across the UK. In May 2026, before production began, Chantelle Connelly announced her departure from the show. For the twenty-seventh season, the rest of the cast reunited in France to celebrate Jay Gardner's 40th birthday, while documenting the pregnancies of Holly Hagan, Sophie Kasei, and Kyle Christie's wife, as well as the subsequent birth of their babies.

== Cast ==
= Cast member features in this series as part of the main cast
= Cast member features in this series as recurring
= Cast member features in this series as a guest
= Cast member does not feature in this series

Name	Series																										
Name	1	2	3	4	5	6	7	8	9	10	11	12	BB	13	14	15	16	17	18	19	20	21	22	23	24	25	26
Name	Current cast members																										
Gaz Beadle																											
Jay Gardner																											
Holly Hagan																											
Sophie Kasaei																											
Ricci Guarnaccio																											
Aaron Chalmers																											
Kyle Christie																											
Nathan Henry																											
Abbie Holborn																											
Former cast members
Charlotte Crosby																											
Greg Lake																											
Vicky Pattison																											
James Tindale																											
Rebecca Walker																											
Dan Thomas-Tuck																											
Scotty T																											
Marnie Simpson																											
Chloe Ferry																											
Chantelle Connelly																											
Marty McKenna																											
Zahida Allen																											
Chelsea Barber																											
Sam Bentham																											
Sarah Goodhart																											
Elettra Lamborghini																											
Billy Phillips																											
Eve Shannon																											
Sam Gowland																											
Stephanie Snowdon																											
Adam Guthrie																											
Alex MacPherson																											
Grant Molloy																											
Nick Murdoch																											
Dee Nguyen																											
Chrysten Zenoni																											
Faith Mullen																											
Beau Brennan																											
Tahlia Chung																											
Bethan Kershaw																											
Natalie Phillips																											
Anthony Kennedy																											
Amelia Lily																											
Louis Shaw																											

== Reception ==
In a column for Metro, Christopher Hooton described the show as "a gaudy kaleidoscope of six packs, shots, fights, simulated fellatio and exposed breasts," but said that criticism of the show was futile given its intent, noting that "being shocked by the lasciviousness of Geordie Shore is like being shocked by the lack of nutrition in a Pot Noodle." Newcastle Central MP Chi Onwurah has described the show as "bordering on pornographic", and announced she will be raising questions in Parliament about the issues raised by the programme. Newcastle has also benefited from the show by increased tourism. Hotels and travel agents have attributed increased bookings, up by as much as three or four times in 2012 from 2011, due to the popularity of the program.

Series 12, episode 6 features the most-watched episode to date, watched by 1,367,000, the show's peak viewership. Series 12 was the most-watched series on average with 1,237,000 viewers per week.

Series 22 currently has the lowest average viewers to date, averaging at 131,000.

== Music & radio ==
In December 2013, Gaz released his debut single "Party Like a Rockstar (Up Your Game)" in a bid to reach Christmas number one. Vocals from the track come from Australian recording artist Emily Williams and The X Factor series eight finalists The Risk. Vicky also appears in the music video.

In August 2014, Holly released her debut single, a cover version of Milkshake, which was previously released in 2003 by Kelis and charted at number 2 in the UK.

In February 2018, Elettra Lamborghini who was featured in series 14 & 15, released her debut single "Pem Pem".

In August 2024, Abbie Holborn launched her radio show, Out with Abbie on North East dance music station, Frisk Radio

== Singles ==
Single	Year	Peak chart positions				Album
Single	Year	UK	IRE	ITA	NED	Album
"Party Like A RockStar (Up Your Game)" (Gaz & Olabean featuring The Risk and Emily Williams)	2013	–	–	–	–	Non-album singles
"Milkshake" (Holly Hagan)	2014	–	—	—	—	Non-album singles
"Pem Pem" (Elettra Lamborghini)	2018	–	–	6	–	Twerking Queen
"Mala" (Elettra Lamborghini)	2018	–	–	13	–	Twerking Queen
"Tócame" (Elettra Lamborghini featuring Pitbull)	2019	–	–	–	–	Twerking Queen
"Fanfare" (Elettra Lamborghini featuring Gué Pequeno)	2019	–	–	–	–	Twerking Queen
"Musica (e il resto scompare)" (Elettra Lamborghini)	2020	–	–	–	–	Twerking Queen

== Internet distribution ==
The uncensored episodes are available to buy on the UK iTunes Store the day after episodes are aired.

It is available to stream on Paramount+.

== Broadcast ==
Geordie Shore premiered in Canada in 2011 on MTV Canada. In Australia the programme began airing in 2011 on MTV Australia. In September 2011, the show was bought by Network Ten and now broadcasts the series on its digital channel Eleven also in Australia, this concluded in 2013. In 2012 it began airing in New Zealand on MTV (New Zealand). The United States premiere was in 2012 on MTV.

== Spin-offs ==
- Judge Geordie
- Goldie Shore: Radgies To Riches
- The Charlotte Show
- Geordie Shore OGs
- Geordie Stories: Sophie's Fertility Journey (Originally released titled Every Woman)
- Geordie Stories: Charlotte Mam of Two (Series 1 titled Geordie Stories: Charlotte's New Baby)
- Geordie Stories: Nathan and Dad
