= Sam Gowland =

British television personality

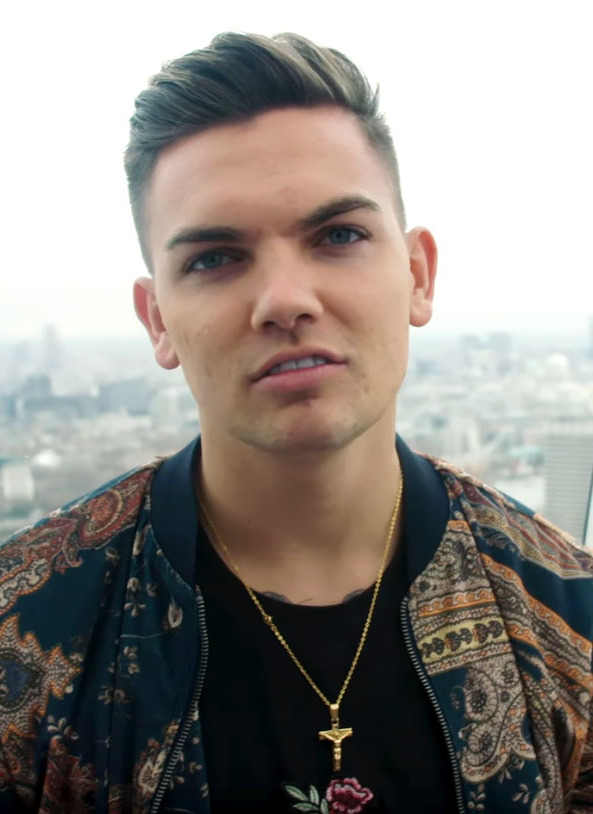
- Gowland in 2018
- Born: 2 August 1995 (age 31); Middlesbrough, North Yorkshire, England
- Occupations: Television and social media personality
- Years active: 2017–present
- Television: Love Island; Geordie Shore
- Partner: Chloe Ferry (2017–2020)

Sam Gowland (born 2 August 1995) is an English television and social media personality. He rose to fame when he participated in the third series of the ITV2 dating reality competition Love Island in 2017. After his stint on the programme, he began appearing in the MTV reality show Geordie Shore, debuting in the sixteenth series in 2018 before leaving in 2019 at the conclusion of the twentieth series.

== Early life ==
Gowland was born on 2 August 1995 in Middlesbrough and was raised in Thornaby-on-Tees. After leaving school, he became an oil rig worker.

Gowland is the cousin of footballer Jonathan Grounds.

== Career ==
On 29 May 2017, Gowland was unveiled as one of the eleven original contestants for the third series of the ITV2 dating reality competition Love Island. During his first stint on the series, he was "coupled up" with four different women, originally with Camilla Thurlow. On Day 23, he was "dumped" from the programme, alongside Chloë Crowhurst; Gowland had been coupled up with her and Crowhurst had also been an original contestant. However, Gowland and fellow "dumpee" Mike Thalassitis returned to the programme on Day 39, in which they became the first Islanders to return to the villa having been dumped from the island, after being voted back in a recent public vote. Gowland then coupled up with Georgia Harrison, before they were dumped together on Day 46, just a week after his return and days prior to the live final.

Five months after Love Island concluded, in December 2017, it was confirmed that Gowland would join the cast of the sixteenth series of MTV reality show Geordie Shore, which commenced on 9 January 2018. Gowland was notable for his row with fellow cast member Alex MacPherson in the seventeenth series after the latter made unintentional sexual advances towards Gowland's girlfriend Chloe Ferry and voluntarily leaving the house in the tenth episode after sustaining a minor injury before returning in the following episode. In October 2019, it was confirmed that Gowland, as well as his co-star Tahlia Chung, would not be returning for the twenty-first series, ending long-running speculation over his future as a result of the breakdown of his and Ferry's relationship.

== Filmography ==
Year	Title	Role	Notes
2017	Love Island	Himself	Contestant; series 3
2018–2019; 2024	Geordie Shore	Himself	Main cast member; series 16–20; Special guest, series 24
2018	Celebrity Ghost Hunt	Himself	Contestant, guest appearances
2019	Geordie Shore OGs	Himself	Guest appearance (series 1)
2020	Eating With My Ex	Himself	Guest appearance in celebrity special with Georgia Harrison

== List of MMA fights ==
1 wins – 0 losses – 0 draws

Score	Record	Opponent	Medhod	Round	Time	Event	Date	Location	Notes
Winner	1–0	ENG Marty McKenna	Submission (Rear-Naked Choke)	2	2:15	Fame MMA UK 1	14 December 2019	ENG Newcastle	MMA debut

== See also ==
- List of Love Island contestants
