= Jay Baker (rugby union) =

Welsh rugby union player

- Full name: Jay Baker
- Born: 6 October 1991 (age 35) Wales
- Height: 189 cm (6 ft 2 in)
- Weight: 94 kg (14 st 11 lb; 207 lb)

Rugby union career
- Position: Wing
- Current team: Ospreys
Senior career
Years	Team	Apps	(Points)
2013-16	Aberavon RFC	37	(115)
2016-17	Ospreys	6	(5)

Jay Baker (born 6 October 1991) is a Welsh rugby union player who plays for Ospreys as a winger.

Baker made his debut for the Ospreys in 2016 against Harlequins having previously played for the Ospreys academy and Aberavon RFC.
