= Marty McKenna =

British reality television personality

Martin McKenna (born 27 July 1994) from Walker, Newcastle upon Tyne, is a British reality television personality known for appearing on the television shows Geordie Shore, Ex on the Beach and Celebs Go Dating.

== Career ==
In September 2010, Mckenna joined the British Army at Army Foundation College - Harrogate, aspiring to be in the Royal Regiment of Fusiliers. In March 2011, Mckenna applied for a Discharge as of Right (DAOR) and ended his career in the British Army. In August 2015, he was brought into the third series of Ex on the Beach as the ex of Jemma Lucy. He was joined by his ex-girlfriend, Sarah Goodhart, before leaving the show due to dehydration.

In October 2015, soon after his role in Ex on The Beach, he joined the twelfth series of Geordie Shore and he left the show in fifteenth series. On the show, he had an on and off relationship with Ex Chloe Ferry. In 2022, he appeared in the tenth series of Celebs Go Dating.

== Filmography ==
As himself
Year	Title	Note
2015; 2017	Ex on the Beach	Ex of Jemma Lucy (Series 3); Main cast (Series 7)
2016–2017, 2021–2022	Geordie Shore	Cast member
2022	Celebs Go Dating	Main cast; Series 10

== List of MMA fights ==
0 winners – 1 loss – 0 draws

Score	Record	Opponent	Medhod	Round	Time	Event	Date	Location	Notes
Loss	0-1	ENG Sam Gowland	Submission (Rear-Naked Choke)	2	2:15	Fame MMA UK 1	14.12.2019	ENG Newcastle	MMA debut
