= Ricci Guarnaccio =

English reality television personality

Ricci James Guarnaccio (born 20 September 1986) is an English reality television personality, television presenter and DJ. He is best known for Geordie Shore, Celebrity Big Brother, Ex on the Beach and Dinner Date. In 2016, he began filming Ultimate Worldie, an Australian television programme.

== Personal life ==
Guarnaccio was born in Durham, England.

He was previously engaged to fellow Geordie Shore star Vicky Pattison and was linked to Sallie Axl, and Lauren Goodger.
