= Holly Hagan =

British reality television personality

Holly Hagan-Blyth
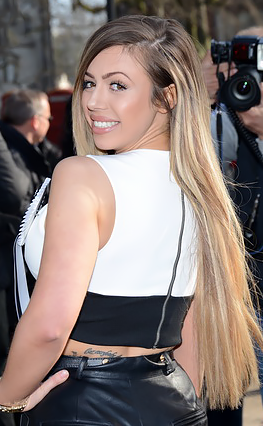
- Hagan in 2015
- Born: Holly Victoria Hagan; 7 July 1992 (age 34); Thornaby-on-Tees, North Yorkshire, England
- Occupations: Television personality; model; singer
- Television: Geordie Shore
- Spouse: Jacob Blyth (m. 2022)
- Children: 2

Holly Victoria Hagan-Blyth (née Hagan) is an English television personality from Thornaby-on-Tees. She starred on and is best known from the MTV series Geordie Shore.

== Early life ==
Hagan was born in the town of Thornaby-on-Tees in Northeast England, which is part of North Yorkshire county. For three years when Hagan was a small child, she and her parents lived in a council house in Grove Hill, a housing estate in Middlesbrough. She was enrolled by her mother in a private nursery. When Hagan was three years old, the council house in which she lived was burgled during the night. Sometime later, her mother witnessed three people inside a burning vehicle, and made plans to move elsewhere the following day. Ultimately, the family moved to Thornaby-on-Tees, and at the age of four, Hagan was enrolled at St Joseph's Catholic Primary School.

Before Geordie Shore, Hagan worked for HM Revenue and Customs and in sales at a Santander call centre, in hopes of launching a career as a glamour model. After applying for, and securing a place on the show she eventually quit her job.

== Career ==
Hagan has featured in many men's magazines including Nuts with a photoshoot with fellow castmate Vicky Pattison as well as by herself on several occasions. She has appeared on the cover of both the UK's FHM and Loaded. In July 2012, she posed topless for a photoshoot with the magazine.

Hagan is one of the original cast members of MTV hit reality TV show Geordie Shore, making her first appearance in the first episode of Series one. During her time on the show she embarked on relationships with other cast members including James Tindale, Scott Timlin and Kyle Christie. After making 111 appearances Hagan left the show in the Series 13 finale which aired on 20, December 2016.

In 2014, Hagan released a remixed cover version of "Milkshake". In April 2016, Hagan and her ex-boyfriend, co star Kyle Christie starred in MTV's new show Car Crash Couples. Hagan also released an autobiography titled "Holly Hagan: Not quite a Geordie book."

In October 2016, Hagan appeared on Celebrity Storage Hunters UK as a buyer in Season 1. In January 2017, Hagan appeared on Celebrity 100% Hotter. In early 2018, Hagan appeared on E4’s spin off series Five Star Hotel, alongside Joey Essex, Lydia Bright and Spencer Matthews.

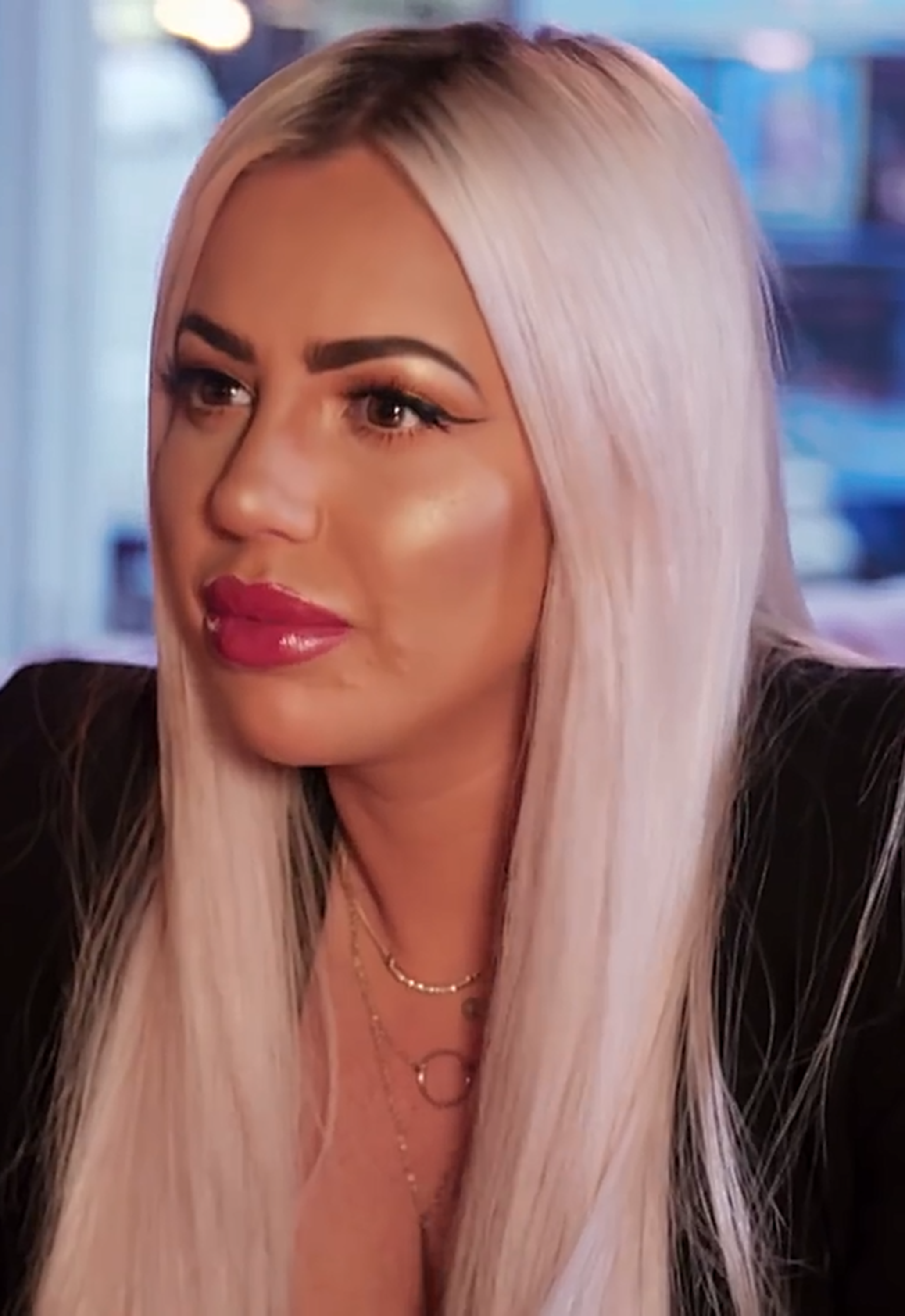
Holly Hagan in 2018

Holly returned to Geordie Shore mid-way through series 17 in Australia following a 2 year break She did the same in series 18 and became a part time cast member for series 19 and made various appearances on nights out throughout the series however did not live in the house. Following her short return, Holly made the decision not to return for anymore series. In 2019, Hagan began starring in the MTV series Geordie Shore OGs, a spinoff series of Geordie Shore until its cancellation in 2021. In October 2022 Hagan returned for the 23rd series of Geordie Shore which brought back the original cast members excluding Vicky Pattison and Gary Beadle who chose not to return.

== Personal life ==
Hagan grew up in Thornaby. In June 2019, Hagan announced her engagement to footballer boyfriend Jacob Blyth. They were married in Ibiza on 6 June 2022. In January 2023, announced they were expecting their first child. She gave birth to a son in June 2023. In November 2025, announced they were expecting their second child. In June 2026, she gave birth to their daughter.

== Filmography ==
As herself
Year	Title	Notes
2011–2016, 2018–2019, 2022–	Geordie Shore	Main cast; 146 Episodes
2016	Car Crash Couples	Contestant with Kyle Christie
2016	Celebrity Storage Hunters UK	Main buyer
2016	Drunk History UK	Storyteller
2017	Celebrity 100% Hotter	
2018	Five Star Hotel	Main cast (Series 1)
2019	Holly Hagan: Taking On The Trolls	Herself
2019–2021	Geordie Shore OGs	Main cast
2021	Celebs on the Farm	Contestant

=== Guest appearances ===
- Warsaw Shore (19 January 2014)
- Drunk History (23 February 2016)
- Just Tattoo of Us (10 April 2017, 8 May 2017)
- The Charlotte Show (2 July 2019)

== Discography ==
- 2012: "VIP, Who Cares!"
- 2014: "Milkshake"
