= Scotty T =

British television personality

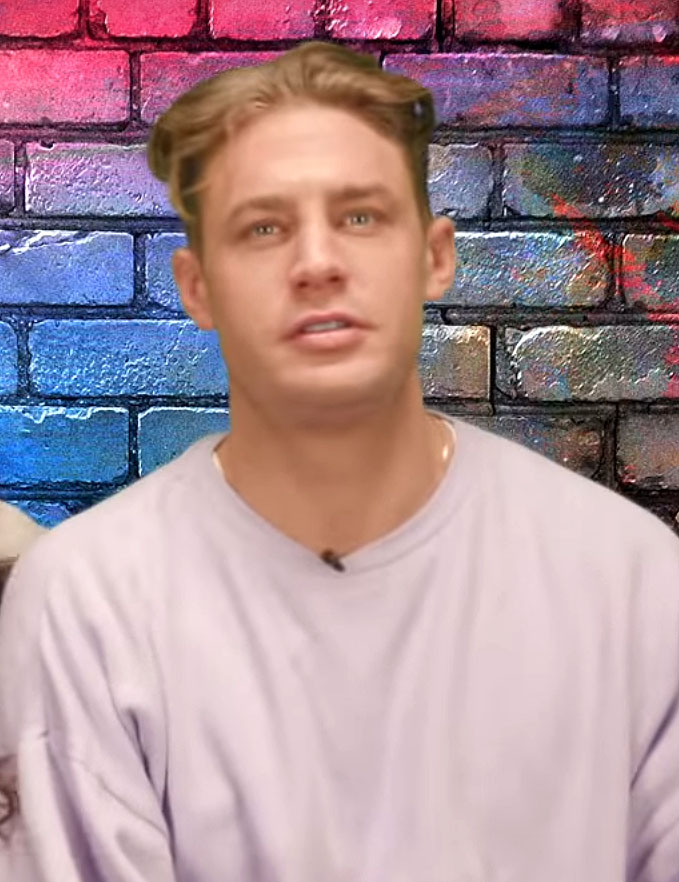
- Scotty T in 2018
- Born: Scott Robert Timlin; 26 April 1988 (age 38); Newcastle upon Tyne, England
- Occupations: Television personality, influencer
- Television: Geordie Shore (2012–2019, 2022–2025); Celebrity Big Brother (2016); Ex on the Beach (2016); Just Tattoo of Us (2018)

Scott Robert Timlin (born 26 April 1988), also known as Scotty T, is an English reality TV personality and influencer who is best known for appearing on Geordie Shore from 2012 to 2019 and winning Celebrity Big Brother in 2016.

== Career ==
Timlin rose to fame as a cast member in the MTV reality series Geordie Shore, before being axed as a cast member in 2018 after being pictured snorting a suspicious substance. He also appeared on the fourth series of Ex on the Beach and won the seventeenth series of Celebrity Big Brother. He is the second Geordie Shore cast member to win the series, after Charlotte Crosby in 2013. In 2015, Timlin performed with the male stripping troupe Dreamboys, doing guest appearances alongside fellow Geordie Shore cast member Gaz Beadle. In March 2016, he was announced as the face of boohooMAN.com. In 2018, Timlin received a pig tattoo with the phrase "raid my village", a reference to the game Coin Master. He said he got the tattoo when he lost a bet with Charlotte Crosby, and had to get the tattoo as a result. In November 2020, he joined OnlyFans and began uploading X-rated content.

Timlin's current role includes advertising products on social media as an influencer.

== Legal issues ==
In 2019, Timlin was declared bankrupt with debt of £147,000.

In December 2021, the Advertising Standards Agency publicly reprimanded him for not disclosing financial connections with advertisers and he remains (at time of writing) on their list of "Non-compliant social media influencers".

In 2024, Timlin was charged by the Financial Conduct Authority, alongside other influencers, in relation to promotions of unauthorised investments.

== Filmography ==
Year	Title	Role	Notes
2009	Basshunter: "Every Morning"	Himself	Music video; directed by Alex Herron
2012–2019; 2022, 2025	Geordie Shore	Himself	Main cast, 114 episodes
2013	Backchat	Himself	Episode: "Gary Lineker, Holly Hagan, Marnie Simpson, and Scott Timlin"
2014	Warsaw Shore	Himself	Special Guest
2015	The Gadget Show	Himself	Episode dated 9 March 2015
2016	Big Brother's Bit on the Side	Himself	Episode dated 5 February 2016
2016	Celebrity Big Brother	Himself	Series 17 winner; 36 episodes
2016	Ex on the Beach	Himself	7 episodes; Series 4
2016	Geordie Shore: Big Birthday Battle	Himself	2 episodes
2016	Neighbours	Himself	Episode dated 12 May 2016; Cameo appearance
2016	The Saturday Show	Himself	Episode dates 6 February 2016
2017	When Celebrity Goes Horribly Wrong	Himself	TV documentary
2018	Just Tattoo of Us	Himself (presenter)	10 episodes; Series 3
2019	Your Face or Mine?	Himself (presenter)	Episode: "Billy and Nikita"
2023	Farage	Himself	GB News chat show; Episode dated 23 March 2023

Preceded by James Hill	Celebrity Big Brother UK winner Series 17 (2016)	Succeeded by Stephen Bear
