= Chloe Ferry =

English television personality

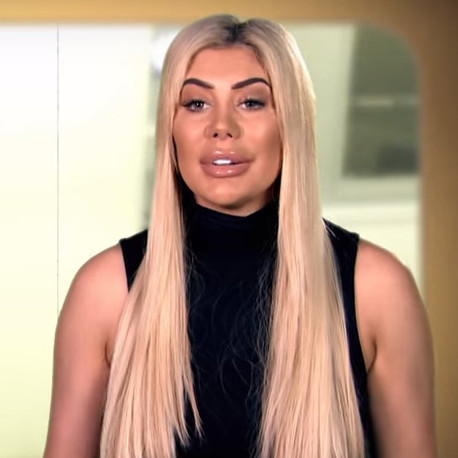
- Ferry in 2018
- Born: Chloe West Etherington; 31 August 1995 (age 31); Newcastle upon Tyne, England
- Occupation: Television personality
- Years active: 2015–present
- Television: Geordie Shore; Celebrity Big Brother; Ex on the Beach; Just Tattoo of Us; Celebs Go Virtual Dating; Sun, Sex and Suspicious Parents
- Partner: Sam Gowland (2017-2020)

Chloe Ferry (born Chloe West Etherington; 31 August 1995) is an English television personality from Newcastle, known for being a cast member in the MTV reality series Geordie Shore. She also took part in the nineteenth series of Celebrity Big Brother in 2017.

== Career ==
On 17 February 2015, it was announced that Chloe Ferry had joined the cast of Geordie Shore making her debut in the tenth series. On 30 June 2015, Ferry appeared in an episode of Sun, Sex and Suspicious Parents where her family followed her to Sunny Beach, Bulgaria. On 13 January 2017, Ferry entered the Celebrity Big Brother house taking part in the nineteenth series. She was evicted a week later. Ferry also appeared in the second series of Super Shore in 2016 for one episode with another Geordie Shore cast member, Kyle Christie.

== Personal life ==
Ferry was in a relationship with Geordie Shore co-star Sam Gowland from 2017 to 2019. In July 2020, Ferry announced that she is bisexual.

== Filmography ==
As herself
| Year | Title | Note |
|---|---|---|
| 2015–2026 | Geordie Shore | Cast member (series 10–26) |
| 2017 | Celebrity Big Brother 19 | 5th eliminated |
| 2017 | Ex on the Beach | Ex of Marty McKenna |
| 2018 | Celebrity 100% Hotter | Client |
| 2018–2020 | Just Tattoo of Us | Guest presenter |
| 2019 | Geordie Shore: The Geordies React | Cast member |
| 2019 | Geordie Cribs | Web series |
| 2019 | Chloe Ferry Is A Grown Up | Web series |
| 2019 | Celebs Vs Pets | Web series |
| 2019 | Geordie Shore OGs | Guest appearance (series 1) |
| 2020 | Celebs Go Virtual Dating | Main cast |
| 2020 | Geordie Shore: Their History | Cast member |
| 2021 | Celebs Go Dating: The Mansion | Main cast |
| 2021 | Geordie Shore: Ten Years On The Toon | Cast member |
| 2021–2024 | Geordie React | Cast member (series 1–3) |
| 2022 | All Star Shore | Withdrew |
| 2026 | Sidemen Inside | 5th place |

Guest appearances

As herself
| Year | Title |
|---|---|
| 2015 | Sun, Sex and Suspicious Parents |
| 2016 | Super Shore |
| 2017 | Sex Pod |
| 2017 | Release the Hounds |
| 2017 | Your Face or Mine? |
| 2019 | Celebs Go Dating |
