= List of Ex on the Beach cast members =

The following is a list of cast members who have appeared in the British MTV reality series Ex on the Beach. Each season, a group of single women and men become housemates at a luxury villa. Over time, their ex-boyfriends and ex-girlfriends are introduced to the show to introduce dramatic tension. The show was first broadcast in the UK in 2014. In 2020, celebrity cast members were introduced in a new spin-off, Celebrity Ex on the Beach.

== Cast ==
- **Bold** indicates original cast member; all other cast were brought into the series as an ex.

Series	Name	Age	Hometown	Exes	Ref.
1	**Ashley Cain**	23	Nuneaton	Talitha Minnis	
1	**Chloe Goodman**	20	Brighton	Ross Worswick	
1	**Emily Gillard**	18	Cheshire	—N/a	
1	**Farah Sattaur**	28	London	—N/a	
1	**Jack Lomax**	22	Nottingham	—N/a	
1	**Liam Lewis**	25	Hartlepool	—N/a	
1	**Marco Alexandre**	22	Sheffield	Frankie Thorpe	
1	**Vicky Pattison**	25	Newcastle	Dan Conn, Ricci Guarnaccio, Ross Worswick	
1	Ross Worswick	23	Manchester	Chloe Goodman, Emma Jane Lang, Shelby Billingham, Vicky Pattison	
1	Frankie Thorpe	18	Kettering	Marco Alexandre	
1	Talitha Minnis	21	Norwich	Ashley Cain, Joss Mooney	
1	Emma Jane Lang	23	Manchester	Joss Mooney, Ross Worswick	
1	Dan Conn	27	Sydney, Australia	Vicky Pattison	
1	Joss Mooney	24	Manchester/Norwich	Emma Jane Lang, Shelby Billingham, Talitha Minnis	
1	Shelby Billingham	19	Birmingham	Joss Mooney, Ross Worswick	
1	Ricci Guarnaccio	27	Newcastle	Vicky Pattison	
2	**Anita Kaushik**	22	London	Joe Chandler, Rogan O'Connor	
2	**Connor Hunter**	18	Essex	Megan Clark	
2	**Kayleigh Morris**	26	Wales/London	Adam Gabriel	
2	**Loren Green**	23	Walsall	—N/a	
2	**Luke Goodfellow**	22	Cardiff	Danielle Abbott	
2	**Melissa Reeves**	22	Liverpool	Gary Beadle	
2	**Morgan Evans**	26	Birmingham	Emily Colley	
2	**Rogan O'Connor**	25	Stratford-upon-Avon	Anita Kaushik, Emily Colley, Jess Impiazzi	
2	Adam Gabriel	23	London	Kayleigh Morris	
2	Megan Clark	19	Essex	Connor Hunter	
2	Jess Impiazzi	25	Surrey	Rogan O'Connor	
2	Gary Beadle	26	Newcastle	Charlotte Crosby, Emily Colley, Melissa Reeves	
2	Emily Colley	24	Worcestershire	Ashley Cain, Gary Beadle, Morgan Evans, Rogan O'Connor	
2	Joe Chandler	22	Surrey	Anita Kaushik	
2	Charlotte Crosby	24	Sunderland	Gary Beadle	
2	Danielle Abbott	22	Reading	Luke Goodfellow	
2	Ashley Cain	23	Nuneaton	Emily Colley	
3	**Amy Cooke**	21	Cardiff	Jordan Davies	
3	**Graham Griffiths**	26	Wiltshire	Holly Rickwood	
3	**Jayden Robins**	30	London	—N/a	
3	**Laura Summers**	30	Manchester	Jemma Lucy	
3	**Kirk Norcross**	26	Essex	Cami-Li, Jemma Lucy, Vicky Pattison	
3	**Megan McKenna**	22	Essex	Jordan Davies	
3	**Megan Rees**	20	Carmarthen	Stephen Cochrane	
3	**Stephen Bear**	25	East London	Connie Wiltshire	
3	Jemma Lucy	27	Manchester	Kirk Norcross, Laura Summers, Marty Mack, Rogan O'Connor	
3	Jordan Davies	22	Cardiff	Ali Drew, Amy Cooke, Megan McKenna	
3	Marty McKenna	20	Newcastle	Jemma Lucy, Sarah Goodhart	
3	Sarah Goodhart	21	Newcastle	Marty McKenna	
3	Cami-Li	28	Miami	Kirk Norcross	
3	Ali Drew	25	Cardiff	Jordan Davies	
3	Holly Rickwood	23	Portsmouth	Graham Griffiths	
3	Vicky Pattison	26	Newcastle	Kirk Norcross	
3	Stephen Cochrane	25	Cornwall	Megan Rees	
3	Rogan O'Connor	25	Stratford-upon-Avon	Jemma Lucy	
3	Connie Wiltshire	20	Essex	Stephen Bear	
4	**Helen Briggs**	20	Manchester	Chet Johnson, Kieran Lee	
4	**Joe Delaney**	22	Runcorn	Gina Barrett	
4	**Lewis Good**	25	London	—N/a	
4	**Nancy-May Turner**	21	Kent	—N/a	
4	**Naomi Hedman**	22	London	—N/a	
4	**Olivia Walsh**	24	Manchester	James Moore	
4	**Scotty T**	27	Newcastle	Ashleigh Defty	
4	**Youssef Hassane**	20	Kent	Lacey Fuller	
4	James Moore	24	Blackpool	Kristina Metcalf, Olivia Walsh	
4	Kieran Lee	23	Burnley	Helen Briggs	
4	Gina Barrett	22	Liverpool	Alex Kippen, Joe Delaney	
4	Ashleigh Defty	20	Newcastle	Scotty T	
4	Lacey Fuller	19	Kent	Brandon Myers, Jordan Davies, Youssef Hassane	
4	Jordan Davies	23	Cardiff	Lacey Fuller, Megan McKenna	
4	Megan McKenna	23	Essex	Jordan Davies	
4	Chet Johnson	25	London	Helen Briggs	
4	Kristina Metcalf	22	Liverpool	James Moore	
4	Alex Kippen	22	Liverpool	Gina Barrett	
4	Brandon Myers	19	Kent	Lacey Fuller	
5	**Chloe Goodman**	22	Brighton	—N/a	
5	**Gary Beadle**	28	Newcastle	Charlotte Dawson, Chrysten Zenoni, Lillie Lexie Gregg, Melissa Reeves	
5	**Jemma Lucy**	28	Manchester	David Hawley	
5	**Jess Impiazzi**	27	Surrey	—N/a	
5	**Jordan Davies**	23	Cardiff	—N/a	
5	**Liam Lewis**	27	Hartlepool	—N/a	
5	**Olivia Walsh**	24	Manchester	Joss Mooney	
5	**Stephen Bear**	26	East London	Holly Rickwood, Kayleigh Morris	
5	Kayleigh Morris	27	Port Talbot	Ashley Cain, Joss Mooney, Stephen Bear	
5	David Hawley	25	Newcastle	Jemma Lucy	
5	Charlotte Dawson	23	Blackpool	Alex Stewart, Gaz Beadle	
5	Holly Rickwood	24	Portsmouth	Conor Scurlock, Stephen Bear	
5	Ashley Cain	25	Nuneaton	Kayleigh Morris, Melissa Reeves	
5	Lillie Lexie Gregg	25	Birmingham	Gary Beadle	
5	Conor Scurlock	22	London	Aimee Kimber, Holly Rickwood	
5	Chrysten Zenoni	19	Gold Coast, Australia	Gary Beadle	
5	Alex Stewart	23	Blackpool	Charlotte Dawson	
5	Aimee Kimber	22	Essex	Conor Scurlock	
5	Melissa Reeves	24	Liverpool	Ashley Cain, Gary Beadle	
5	Joss Mooney	26	Manchester/Norwich	Kayleigh Morris, Olivia Walsh	
6	**Alex Leslie**	25	London	Alice Downer	
6	**Harriette Harper**	25	Essex	Jack Devlin	
6	**Josh Ritchie**	22	Bolton	Chanelle McCleary, Jenny Thompson, Nicole Bass	
6	**Maisie Gillespie**	20	Cardiff	Aaron Chalmers, Sam Stoddart	
6	**Ross Worswick**	27	Manchester	—N/a	
6	**Sean Pratt**	26	Coventry	Taylor Morgan	
6	**Zahida Allen**	22	Newcastle	Joe McLean	
6	**ZaraLena Jackson**	24	Preston	—N/a	
6	Joe McLean	23	Newcastle	Zahida Allen	
6	Nicole Bass	25	Essex	Adam Oukhellou, Jack Devlin, Jacques Fraser, Josh Ritchie	
6	Jack Devlin	24	Essex	Frankie Isabella, Harriette Harper, Nicole Bass	
6	Alice Downer	22	London	Alex Leslie	
6	Aaron Chalmers	29	Newcastle	Becca Edwards, Maisie Gillespie	
6	Adam Oukhellou	27	London	Frankie Isabella, Nicole Bass	
6	Becca Edwards	24	Newcastle	Aaron Chalmers	
6	Jack Fraser	26	Essex	Frankie Isabella, Nicole Bass	
6	Frankie Isabella	24	Walthamstow	Adam Oukhellou, Jack Devlin, Jacques Fraser	
6	Chanelle McCleary	25	Manchester	Josh Ritchie	
6	Jenny Thompson	26	Bolton	Josh Ritchie	
6	Sam Stoddart	21	Wales	Maisie Gillespie	
6	Taylor Morgan	21	Nuneaton	Sean Pratt	
7	**Che McSorley**	19	Aberdeen	Josh Ritchie, Lee Moran	
7	**Dean Ralph**	28	London	Stevie Coiley	
7	**Fatima Rull**	25	Manchester	David Hawley	
7	**Jordan Wright**	24	Essex	Sydney Longmuir	
7	**Marty McKenna**	22	Newcastle	Chloe Ferry	
7	**Max Morley**	24	Huddersfield	Georgia Crone	
7	**Nicole Dutt**	21	Birmingham	Brad Hayward	
7	**Savannah Kemplay**	23	Leeds	—N/a	
7	Lee Moran	24	Dublin	Che McSorley	
7	Chloe Ferry	21	Newcastle	Marty McKenna, Sam Scott	
7	Brad Hayward	25	Birmingham	Nicole Dutt	
7	Georgia Crone	21	Liverpool	John Speed, Josh Ritchie, Max Morley, Sam Reece	
7	Stevie Coiley	23	Brighton	Dean Ralph	
7	Sam Scott	22	Northampton	Chloe Ferry	
7	Leonie McSorley	19	Aberdeen	—N/a	
7	Sydney Longmuir	20	Essex	Jordan Wright	
7	John Speed	25	Liverpool	Georgia Crone	
7	David Hawley	26	Newcastle	Fatima Rull	
7	Josh Ritchie	22	Bolton	Georgia Crone	
7	Sam Reece	24	Sheffield	Che McSorley, Georgia Crone	
8	**Charlotte Hughes**	24	Essex	Gino Antonio	
8	**Katie Champ**	24	South Wales	—N/a	
8	**Kurtis Hartman**	21	Essex	—N/a	
8	**Marcel Stevens**	25	Manchester	Bea Tetteh, Laura Louise	
8	**Marnie Simpson**	26	Newcastle	Casey Johnson, Kyle Walker	
8	**Sam Lonsdale**	20	Liverpool	—N/a	
8	**Sofia Filipe**	21	London	Joe Angus, Mikey Speakman	
8	**Tom Litten**	24	Somerset	Lorna Boswell	
8	**Zach Tull**	23	Reading	Becky Taylor	
8	Lorna Boswell	21	Sheffield	Bibi Machin, Tom Litten	
8	Joe Angus	22	Newcastle	Sofia Filipe	
8	Mikey Speakman	22	Blackpool	Sofia Filipe	
8	Becky Taylor	23	Reading	Aaron Mcleod, Zach Tull	
8	Casey Johnson	22	London	Marnie Simpson	
8	Kyle Walker	22	Newcastle	Emily Jane Wise, Marnie Simpson	
8	Bibi Machin	21	Sheffield	Lorna Boswell	
8	Laura Louise	28	Newcastle	Marcel Stevens	
8	Gino Antonio	26	Essex	Charlotte Hughes	
8	Bea Tetteh	25	Sheffield	Marcel Stevens	
8	Aaron McLeod	26	Reading	Becky Taylor	
8	Emily Jane Wise	22	Newcastle	Kyle Walker	
9	**Aaron Gill**	27	Manchester	Dominika Olejnik	
9	**Alicia Bradon**	21	Essex	Alex Harbrow	
9	**Bobby Ballard**	24	Essex	Bayley Jenkins	
9	**Daisy Robins**	25	London	Matty B, Sam Ellerington	
9	**Josiah Miller**	20	London	Angelica Fomia	
9	**Natalee Harris**	30	Newport	—N/a	
9	**Rhianne Saxby**	22	Grantham	—N/a	
9	**Zayn London**	25	London	Dominika Wrobel	
9	Bayley Jenkins	22	Essex	Bobby Ballard, George Keys, Rob Tommarello	
9	Dominika Wrobel	21	Poland	Zayn London	
9	Nicky Hardy	23	Manchester	Scarlett Harrison	
9	Scarlett Harrison	24	Manchester	Nicky Hardy	
9	George Keys	22	Essex	Bayley Jenkins, Katie Mann	
9	Matty B	26	Portsmouth	Beth Sedgley, Daisy Robins	
9	Angelica Fomia	24	Milan, Italy	Josiah Miller	
9	Katie Mann	24	Essex	George Keys, Jack Devlin	
9	Sam Ellerington		Derby	Daisy Robins	
9	Jack Devlin	25	Essex	Katie Mann	
9	Dominika Olejnik	21	Manchester	Aaron Gill	
9	Alex Harbrow	22	Essex	Alicia Bradon	
9	Rob Tommarello	27	London	Bayley Jenkins	
9	Beth Sedgley	21	Manchester	Matty B	
11	**Charlie Hannam**	23	Dorset	Jessie-May Begg, Natasha Daisy, Theadora Thompson	
11	**Charlotte Howden**	24	Plymouth	Terique Henry	
11	**Chloe Adams**	25	Wales	Abbey Myers	
11	**Deborah "Debs" Famodun**	25	London		
11	**Emily Hopkins**	27	Derby	Wendale De Jesus	
11	**George Bebbington**	21	Runcorn / Liverpool	Alessandro	
11	**Grant Urquhart**	28	York	Nadia Zarine	
11	**Junior Raji**	26	London	—N/a	
11	**Nadia "Nads" Pointing**	23	Manchester	Ozan Ozturk	
11	**Oliver "Ollie" Large**	30	Bexhill-On-Sea	Liam Redmond	
11	Alessandro			George Bebbington	
11	Wendale De Jesus	28	Derby	Emily Hopkins	
11	Nadia Zarine	28	York	Grant Urquhart	
11	Ozan "Ozzie" Ozturk	30	Chingford	Nadia Pointing	
11	Liam Redmond	30	London	Oliver Large	
11	Jay Munro	26	Glasgow	Alexis Bailey	
11	Natasha "Tasha" Daisy	22	Bristol	Charlie Hannam	
11	Theadora "Thea" Thompson	23	London	Charlie Hannam	
11	Abbey Myers	23	Limerick / Manchester	Chloe Adams	
11	Alexis Bailey	22	Preston	Jay Munro	
11	Terique "Tee" Henry	28	Plymouth	Charlotte Howden	
11	Jessie-May "Jess" Begg	20	London	Charlie Hannam	

- Ages at the time the cast member appeared in the series

Key: = "Cast member" returns to the beach for the second time.
Key: = "Cast member" returns to the beach for the third time.
