= Ex on the Beach (British TV series) series 5 =

Ex on the Beach
- Season 5
- No. of episodes: 10

Release
- Original network: MTV
- Original release: 16 August – 18 October 2016

Series chronology
- ← Previous; Series 4 Next → Series 6

The fifth series of Ex on the Beach, a British television programme, began on 16 August 2016 on MTV, and concluded on 18 October 2016 after ten episodes. The series was confirmed on 8 March 2016 after the final episode of the fourth series, where it was also announced that past contestants would return to the series with "unfinished business". On 5 July 2016, it was confirmed that this would be an "All stars" series with all eight cast members previously appearing in past series. They were eventually joined by exes which also included ex-cast members as well as new ones. The series was filmed in Koh Samui, Thailand.

While the series was airing, Stephen Bear took part in the eighteenth series of Celebrity Big Brother. He later went on to win the series. David Hawley later returned to the beach for the seventh series. Kayleigh also went on to appear in the eighteenth series of Big Brother, but was removed from the house on Day 13 due to threatening behaviour. Later in the year, in August 2017, both Jemma Lucy and Jordan Davies took part in the twentieth series of Celebrity Big Brother, who were both followed by Jess Impiazzi, who later went onto appear in the twenty-first series.

== Cast ==
After the series four finale, it was confirmed that a fifth series would feature old faces with "unfinished" business. The official list of cast members were released on 5 July 2016. It features four boys and four girls from previous series. From the first series it includes Chloe Goodman and Liam Lewis. Geordie Shore star Gaz Beadle and Jess Impiazzi return having previously appeared in the second series, while Jemma Lucy, Jordan Davies and Stephen Bear from the third series all return. Finally Olivia Walsh returns having previously appeared in series 4.

All original cast members arrived at the beach during the first episode and were immediately told to prepare for the arrival of their exes. Bear's ex-one night stand Kayleigh Morris made her return to the beach during the first episode having previously appeared in Series 2, and was later joined by the first new cast member of the series David Hawley who turned up to cause trouble for his ex-girlfriend Jemma. Charlotte Dawson made her debut during the second episode as a face from Gaz's past, while Bear was given the choice to send somebody home. He chose Chloe. Jess decides to follow Chloe during the third episode as she voluntarily leaves the villa. Bear's second ex and Series 3 star Holly Rickwood also arrives during this episode with a score to settle. This episode also features the return of Series 1 and 2 cast member Ashley Cain, who arrives as Kayleigh's ex. The fourth episode saw the debut of Gaz's next ex, Lillie Lexie Gregg who arrived wanting closure from their break-up, and the Tablet of Terror delivered another shock when Olivia was forced to choose send somebody home. She chose Liam. During the fifth episode, Holly's ex-boyfriend Conor Sculock showed up at the beach with an axe to grind. The sixth episode featured the arrival of Gaz's third ex Chrysten, who arrived with a big secret set to destroy his time in the villa. Alex Stewart made his debut during the seventh episode wanting to rekindle the romance between his ex-girlfriend Charlotte. This episode also featured the departure of Jordan following a twist from the Tablet of Terror, and Jemma after she chose to leave following another violent showdown. The eighth episode included the arrival of Aimee Kimber as she made it her mission to stir up trouble for her ex-boyfriend Conor. Melissa Reeves returned to the beach during the ninth episode as Ashley and Gaz's ex having previously appeared in Series 2. The final ex to arrive was Series 1 star Joss Mooney, who returned to the beach during the tenth episode as the ex of both Kayleigh and Olivia.

- **Bold** indicates original cast member; all other cast were brought into the series as an ex.

Episodes	Name	Age (at start of series)	Hometown	Exes
2	**Chloe Goodman**	22	Brighton	—N/a
10	**Gaz Beadle**	28	Newcastle	Charlotte Dawson, Chrysten Zenoni, Lillie Lexie Gregg, Melissa Reeves
7	**Jemma Lucy**	28	Manchester	David Hawley
3	**Jess Impiazzi**	27	Surrey	—N/a
7	**Jordan Davies**	23	Cardiff	—N/a
4	**Liam Lewis**	27	Hartlepool	—N/a
10	**Olivia Walsh**	24	Manchester	Joss Mooney
10	**Stephen Bear**	26	East London	Holly Rickwood, Kayleigh Morris
10	Kayleigh Morris	27	Port Talbot	Ashley Cain, Joss Mooney, Stephen Bear
10	David Hawley	25	Newcastle	Jemma Lucy
9	Charlotte Dawson	23	Blackpool	Alex Stewart, Gaz Beadle
8	Holly Rickwood	24	Portsmouth	Conor Scurlock, Stephen Bear
8	Ashley Cain	25	Nuneaton	Kayleigh Morris, Melissa Reeves
7	Lillie Lexie Gregg	25	Birmingham	Gaz Beadle
6	Conor Scurlock	22	London	Holly Rickwood, Aimee Kimber
5	Chrysten Zenoni	19	Gold Coast, Australia	Gaz Beadle
4	Alex Stewart	23	Blackpool	Charlotte Dawson
3	Aimee Kimber	22	Essex	Conor Scurlock
2	Melissa Reeves	24	Liverpool	Ashley Cain, Gaz Beadle
1	Joss Mooney	26	Manchester/Norwich	Kayleigh Morris, Olivia Walsh

=== Duration of cast ===
Cast members	Episodes									
Cast members	1	2	3	4	5	6	7	8	9	10
Chloe										
Gaz										
Jemma										
Jess										
Jordan										
Liam										
Olivia										
Bear										
Kayleigh										
Hawley										
Charlotte										
Holly										
Ashley										
Lillie										
Conor										
Chrysten										
Alex										
Aimee										
Melissa										
Joss										

Table Key
Key: = "Cast member" is featured in this episode
Key: = "Cast member" arrives on the beach
Key: = "Cast member" has an ex arrive on the beach
Key: = "Cast member" arrives on the beach and has an ex arrive during the same episode
Key: = "Cast member" leaves the beach
Key: = "Cast member" does not feature in this episode

== Episodes ==
No. overall	No. in season	Title	Original release date	Duration	UK viewers
35	1	"Episode 1"	16 August 2016	60 minutes	851,000
Eight faces from the past return to the beach looking for another shot at love, and there's an instant spark between Jemma and Gaz who spend the first night in the penthouse together. Bear and Jordan's rivalry is reignited as both compete for Chloe's attention but receive no luck. Bear's ex Kayleigh arrives in the villa with a lot of enemies waiting to give her a frosty reception, whilst Liam and Olivia get cosy on a date. Jemma and Kayleigh's violent showdown is interrupted by the producers, Jess fears she's made a mistake by coming back to the beach, and Jemma's ex-boyfriend Hawley turns up to cause trouble.
36	2	"Episode 2"	23 August 2016	60 minutes	839,000
Jemma and Hawley's clash at the beach is the talk of the villa, but her attention is elsewhere as she fears that Kayleigh is going to tell him the truth about her night with Gaz. Bear and Chloe continue to get on each other's nerves, and it all ends in tears for Hawley and Jemma when she confesses a long harboured secret to him. Gaz welcomes his ex Charlotte with open arms, Jemma flips when she realises Hawley wants revenge, and Bear is given the ultimate decision from the Tablet of Terror and sends Chloe home. Meanwhile Gaz ends up in the penthouse again, this time with Olivia and Charlotte.
37	3	"Episode 3"	30 August 2016	60 minutes	850,000
Jess packs her bags and leaves the villa having lost her best friend Chloe, whilst Olivia and Gaz continue to grow closer after going on another date. Holly returns to the beach as Bear's ex only to jump straight into a fist fight with arch rival Kayleigh. Jemma rages after discovering what Hawley has been up to with Holly on their date, meaning another violent confrontation is waiting for Holly back at the villa. Bear and Charlotte agree to pursue each other, and the arrival of Ashley has all of the girls weak at the knees. History repeats itself as Ashley snatches Olivia off Gaz and takes her to the penthouse, and Jemma inadvertently gives Hawley the green light.
38	4	"Episode 4"	6 September 2016	60 minutes	800,000
Jemma's anger increases when she discovers that Holly and Hawley have slept together but is adamant that he's using her as a pawn in his game. Gaz is left broken when his ex-girlfriend Lillie arrives on the beach looking for answers. Bear wastes no time in telling Lillie what her ex has been up to in the villa, and Jemma has a confession to make of her own. When Hawley warns Lillie about toxic Jemma, Holly demands to know why he's still bothered by her, and Olivia begins to feel guilty after hearing Lillie's side of the story over the Gaz breakup. Elsewhere, Charlotte is left devastated when she overhears Bear discussing his plans for Lillie, and Liam is sent packing.
39	5	"Episode 5"	13 September 2016	60 minutes	846,000
There's clear tension in the air between Gaz and Lillie as both finally sit down and have a heart-to-heart where Lillie gets the closure she's been waiting for. Jemma and Hawley bury the hatchet much to the annoyance of Holly. Olivia is left red faced when Lillie finally discovers she's slept with Gaz. As Holly's ex-boyfriend Conor turns up, Jemma is quick to throw her under the bus by revealing what she's been up to in the villa. Elsewhere, Lillie is pushed to the limit when Bear dares her to kiss Gaz during a game of truth or dare, and Holly and Conor take swipes at each other in acts of revenge.
40	6	"Episode 6"	20 September 2016	60 minutes	713,000
Bear and Hawley compete for Lillie's attentions as she's torn between both of them. Olivia and Gaz get closer but she's shocked at his sudden U-turn when his ex Chrysten turns up at the beach. After getting cosy with Charlotte, Jordan puts her to bed out of the way in order for him to try his luck with Chrysten. Lillie is distraught after Chrysten reveals she slept with Gaz while he was with her, and Hawley feels Jemma is manipulating Lillie when she begs her to stay away from him. In the wake of Chrysten's bombshell, Kayleigh and Gaz go head-to-head, and Gaz is forced to tell Lillie the truth.
41	7	"Episode 7"	27 September 2016	60 minutes	728,000
Charlotte is sent into a spin when her ex-boyfriend Alex arrives on the beach wanting to rekindle things, but will she tell him what she's been up to in the villa? Bear decides he's bored of Lillie as his eyes sway towards Chrysten, and Holly's clash with Conor draws her towards Hawley once again. Kayleigh sees red when she catches Jemma and Ashley in bed together, and another violent showdown between the girls is too much for Jemma as she decided to leave the villa. Elsewhere Chrysten plays a dangerous game with Lillie, and the Tablet of Terror delivers another nasty surprise as Jordan is sent back into the sea.
42	8	"Episode 8"	4 October 2016	60 minutes	772,000
History repeats itself for Lillie as Bear gets with Chrysten behind her back. Charlotte and Alex clash when she's finally honest with him over her fling with Bear and Jordan, whilst Holly is fuming when Conor finally confesses to cheating on her, and Chrysten feels guilty over her kiss with Bear. Aimee's arrival turns a knife in a sore wound for Holly, but Conor is determined to win her back. Kayleigh is delighted when her and Ashley move to a good place again, and following a fallout from Conor and Bear, he exposes the secret fling with Chrysten to the group leaving Lillie heartbroken again.
43	9	"Episode 9"	11 October 2016	60 minutes	843,000
After getting nowhere with Lillie or Chrysten, Bear tries his luck with Aimee. Gaz is panic struck when Melissa arrives on the beach as his ex, forcing him to make another confession to Lillie before Melissa does. An old feud between Kayleigh and Melissa is reignited when the competition for Ashley heats up, and Gaz and Lillie end up back in each other's arms. Olivia vows to have more fun and turns to Bear for support, but is left drawn back to Gaz. Elsewhere the group go paint balling, Conor and Holly continue to bicker, and a betrayed Lillie puts on a brave face in front of Melissa.
44	10	"Episode 10"	18 October 2016	60 minutes	753,000
Melissa and Kayleigh fail to settle their differences during a heated chat, whilst Aimee and Bear spend the night together. Melissa exacts revenge on Kayleigh by stealing Ashley off her, and Joss is the final ex to arrive, much to the delight of Lillie. Kayleigh breaks down when she learns of Ashley and Melissa's kiss. When Melissa considers taking Gaz to the penthouse, a furious Ashley publicly humiliates her turning the whole villa against her. Elsewhere Aimee confronts Bear after seeing him get cosy with Lillie again, and Ashley hosts an awards ceremony where Gaz and Conor clash.

== Ratings ==
Episode	Date	Official MTV rating	MTV weekly rank	Official MTV+1 rating	Total MTV viewers
Episode 1	16 August 2016	831,000	1	20,000	851,000
Episode 2	23 August 2016	770,000	1	69,000	839,000
Episode 3	30 August 2016	830,000	1	20,000	850,000
Episode 4	6 September 2016	763,000	1	37,000	800,000
Episode 5	13 September 2016	823,000	1	23,000	846,000
Episode 6	20 September 2016	694,000	1	19,000	713,000
Episode 7	27 September 2016	702,000	1	26,000	728,000
Episode 8	4 October 2016	742,000	1	30,000	772,000
Episode 9	11 October 2016	820,000	1	23,000	843,000
Episode 10	18 October 2016	716,000	1	37,000	753,000
Average viewers		769,000	1	30,000	800,000
