= Jemma Lucy =

British glamour model and reality TV show participant

- Born: Jemma Henley; 16 May 1988 (age 38); Oxford, England
- Occupations: Television personality, model
- Years active: 2005–present
- Television: Brat Camp (2005); Signed by Katie Price (2011); Ex on the Beach (2015-2016); Celebrity Big Brother (2017)
- Children: 1

Jemma Lucy (née Henley) is a British reality television contestant and OnlyFans creator. She is best known for her appearances on the MTV UK reality series; Ex on the Beach series 3 and series 5.

== Television career ==
In 2005, Lucy made her first television appearance on Channel 4's, Brat Camp. In 2011, she was a contestant on Signed by Katie Price, where she attempted to win a modeling contract, she placed sixth overall. Katie Price and Lucy were later involved in a public feud.

In 2015, she took part in MTV UK's Ex on the Beach series 3, arriving as the ex-girlfriend of Laura-Alicia Summers in episode 1. Lucy was the first female LGBTQ+ contestant in the shows history being the only LGBTQ+ contestant, until 2023, when George Bebbington was the first male LGBTQ+ contestant to appear on the show. During her time on the show she briefly began a relationship with The Only Way is Essex star, Kirk Norcross and feuded with his ex-girlfriend, alternative model Cami-Li.

In 2016, Lucy returned to Ex on the Beach, participating in the fifth series as an all star. She mutually agreed with the shows producers to leave the house in episode 7 after multiple physical altercations with cast members, Holly Rickwood and Kayleigh Morris. She was involved in a controversial moment in the show, which featured her having a threesome with Ashley Cain and Olivia Walsh, which received a lot of negative press in the tabloids.

In a 2023 interview, Lucy alleged the producers of Ex on the Beach, coerced her in to have non-consensual sex (that she was happy to do at the time to “boost” her appeal) on both series of the show she appeared on. She claimed the producers encouraged her by saying she'd receive more airtime if she slept with specific cast members and threatened to have her sent home from the show if she didn't comply.

In 2017, she entered the twentieth series of Celebrity Big Brother, on Day 1, she was evicted on the final night, placing sixth overall. During her time in the Big Brother house, she feuded with Girls Aloud member, Sarah Harding, which resulted in multiple heated confrontations. She also feuded with Hollyoaks actor, Paul Danan.

== Personal life ==
Lucy has an OnlyFans page, posting amateur pornography videos and nude photos.

In July 2019, an Instagram post by Lucy was banned by the Advertising Standards Authority after it was ruled that the image and text encouraged unsafe practices during pregnancy, made false claims about weight loss and was not properly identified as an advertisement.

Lucy has a child.

== Filmography ==
Television
Year	Title	Role	Notes
2005	Brat Camp	Self; feature	
2011	Signed by Katie Price	Self; contestant	6th place, 6 episodes
2015	Ex on the Beach UK series 3	Self; ex	10 episodes
2016	Ex on the Beach UK series 5	Self; original	7 episodes
2017	Botched	Self; botched	1 episode
2017	100% Hotter	Self; contestant	1 episode
2017	Celebrity Sex Pod	Self; feature	1 episode
2017	Celebrity Big Brother UK series 20	Self; housemate	6th place, 25 episodes
2017	Celebrity Big Brother's Bit on the Side	Self; ex-housemate	1 episode
2019	Eating with my Ex	Self; contestant	1 episode
