= Oukhellou =

Oukhellou is a surname. Notable people with the surname include:

- Adam Oukhellou, British television personality in Ex on the Beach
- Yazmin Oukhellou, British television personality in TOWIE
