= Ross Worswick =

British TV personality

- Born: 20 April 1989 (age 37); Clitheroe, England
- Occupation: Reality television star
- Years active: 2013-2017
- Known for: Ex on the Beach, Desi Rascals
- Television: Ex on the Beach, Desi Rascals
- Spouse: Danielle Fogarty (2022-present)
- Children: 2

Ross Worswick (born April 20, 1989), is a British reality television personality. He is best known for his appearances on MTV UK's Ex On The Beach series 1 and series 6.

== Television career ==
Worswick would first appear on MTV UK's Ex On The Beach series 1 as the ex of Chloe Goodman in 2014.

In 2015 he starred in the second series of Desi Rascals as the boyfriend of Yasmin Oukhellou.

In 2017 Worswick would return for the sixth series as an original cast member on MTV's Ex On The Beach.

== Personal life ==
Worswick began dating Danielle Fogarty, daughter of Carl Fogarty, in 2018. They married in 2022 and have 2 children.

== Filmography ==
Year	Title	Role	Notes
2013	Geeks	Self	
2014	Ex On The Beach UK series 1	Self; ex	8 episodes
2015	Desi Rascals series 2	Self; cast member	8 episodes
2017	Ex On The Beach UK series 6	Self; original cast	10 episodes
