= Ex on the Beach (British TV series) series 9 =

Ex on the Beach
- Season 9
- No. of episodes: 12

Release
- Original network: MTV
- Original release: 15 August – 31 October 2018

Series chronology
- ← Previous; Series 8 Next → Series 11

The ninth series of Ex on the Beach, a British television programme began on 15 August 2018, The series was confirmed at the end of the eighth series final episode in May 2018. The cast members for this series were confirmed on 23 July 2018, and features former Made in Chelsea cast member Daisy Robins, as well as The Valleys star Natalee Harris. The series was filmed in Tulum, Mexico at the luxury villa Playaakun. This series it was revealed that the exes would have more power than ever before, as the "Tablet of Terror" continued to throw twists at them.

== Cast ==
The official list of cast members were released on 23 July 2018. They include four boys; Aaron Gill, Bobby Ballard, Josiah Miller, and Zayn London, and four girls; Alicia Bradon, Daisy Robins, Natalee Harris, and Rhianne Saxby. Daisy has previously appeared as a cast member on Made in Chelsea, whilst Natalee featured in another MTV series The Valleys. Aaron also appeared on Spring Break with Grandad. Jack Devlin, an ex from the sixth series was also confirmed to be making his return to the show, this time as another ex.

All original cast members arrived at the beach during the first episode and were immediately told to prepare for the arrival of their exes. Bayley Jenkins was the first ex to turn up on the beach, as the ex-girlfriend of Bobby. The second episode featured the arrival of Zayn's ex-girlfriend Dominika Wrobel, who turned up desperate for revenge. The episode also included Nicky Hardy's first appearance, as he made a surprise entrance despite not having an ex in the villa. However she wasn't far behind as his ex-girlfriend Scarlett Harrison later arrived to cause carnage for him. The Tablet of Terror also gave Rhianne the power to send somebody home in this episode, who ultimately chose Zayn. George Keys made his debut during the third episode, as the ex-fling of Bayley. The fourth episode included Matty B arriving at the beach as Daisy's ex-boyfriend, and he's given the power to send one former couple home, where he chooses Nicky and Scarlett. During the fifth episode Angelica Fomia arrives at the beach as the former girlfriend of Josiah, and Katie Mann arrives during the sixth episode as a blast from the past for George. Daisy's second ex-boyfriend Sam Ellerington made his debut during the seventh episode, and star of the sixth series Jack Devlin turned up during the eighth as Katie's ex-boyfriend. Josiah was also sent home during this episode after Katie was given the ultimate extra power from the Tablet of Terror. Episode nine featured the arrival of Aaron's ex-girlfriend Dominika Olejnik as well as the departures of both Angelica and Sam following a further twist. Alex Harbrow arrived during the tenth episode hoping to rekindle a relationship with former flame Alicia, and Rob Tommarello caused maximum destruction for ex-girlfriend Bayley during his arrival in the eleventh episode. The final ex of the series was Beth Sedgley, who joined her ex-boyfriend Matty B in the villa.

- **Bold** indicates original cast member; all other cast were brought into the series as an ex.

Episodes	Name	Age (at start of series)	Hometown	Exes
12	**Aaron Gill**	27	Manchester	Dominika Olejnik
12	**Alicia Bradon**	21	Essex	Alex Harbrow
12	**Bobby Ballard**	24	Essex	Bayley Jenkins
12	**Daisy Robins**	25	London	Matty B, Sam Ellerington
8	**Josiah Miller**	20	London	Angelica Fomia
12	**Natalee Harris**	30	Newport	—N/a
12	**Rhianne Saxby**	22	Grantham	—N/a
2	**Zayn London**	25	London	Dominika Wrobel
12	Bayley Jenkins	22	Essex	Bobby Ballard, George Keys, Rob Tommarello
11	Dominika Wrobel	21	Poland	Zayn London
3	Nicky Hardy	23	Manchester	Scarlett Harrison
3	Scarlett Harrison	24	Manchester	Nicky Hardy
10	George Keys	22	Essex	Bayley Jenkins, Katie Mann
9	Matty B	26	Portsmouth	Beth Sedgley, Daisy Robins
6	Angelica Fomia	24	Milan, Italy	Josiah Miller
7	Katie Mann	24	Essex	George Keys, Jack Devlin
3	Sam Ellerington		Derby	Daisy Robins
3	Jack Devlin	25	Essex	Katie Mann
4	Dominika Olejnik	21	Manchester	Aaron Gill
3	Alex Harbrow	22	Essex	Alicia Bradon
2	Rob Tommarello	27	London	Bayley Jenkins
1	Beth Sedgley	21	Manchester	Matty B

=== Duration of cast ===
Cast members	Episodes											
Cast members	1	2	3	4	5	6	7	8	9	10	11	12
Aaron												
Alicia												
Bobby												
Daisy												
Josiah												
Natalee												
Rhianne												
Zayn												
Bayley												
Dominika W												
Nicky												
Scarlett												
George												
Matty B												
Angelica												
Katie												
Sam												
Jack												
Dominika O												
Alex												
Rob												
Beth												

Table Key
Key: = "Cast member" is featured in this episode
Key: = "Cast member" arrives on the beach
Key: = "Cast member" has an ex arrive on the beach
Key: = "Cast member" has two exes arrive on the beach
Key: = "Cast member" arrives on the beach and has an ex arrive during the same episode
Key: = "Cast member" leaves the beach
Key: = "Cast member" has an ex arrive on the beach and leaves during the same episode
Key: = "Cast member" arrives on the beach and leaves during the same episode
Key: = "Cast member" does not feature in this episode

== Episodes ==
No. overall	No. in season	Title	Original release date	Duration	UK viewers
73	1	"Episode 1"	15 August 2018	60 minutes	211,000
A fresh set of sexy singles arrive at the new villa. Bobby and Rhianne instantly click, whilst Daisy ponders what it would be like to get with Aaron. Elsewhere, Natalee and Josiah grow close, but he's left back peddling when he hears about her psychotic past. Daisy fears that the arrival of an ex could spell trouble for her and Aaron, but it's Bobby's ex-girlfriend Bayley who arrives at the beach. As Bayley and Aaron are sent on a date together, the Tablet of Terror delivers another shock surprise. The villa becomes a warzone as Bayley returns from a date with Aaron to a jealous Daisy, and Rhianne is dropped with no explanation when Bobby realises he still has feelings for his ex.
74	2	"Episode 2"	22 August 2018	60 minutes	180,000
Bobby and Bayley reminisce over their past, whilst Zayn continues to grind Natalee's gears. Dominika W arrives on the beach as Zayn's ex to expose his lies, and Daisy worries that Aaron's head will turn. Rhianne chooses to send Zayn home when the Tablet of Terror throws another twist into the mix, just as Nicky shows up at the villa as his replacement. As Nicky begins to settle in, he's knocked for six when his ex-girlfriend Scarlett turns up. Elsewhere Dominika W is warned about girl code, and Daisy is left broken after Scarlett picks Aaron to spend the night with her in the penthouse.
75	3	"Episode 3"	29 August 2018	60 minutes	206,200
Just as Bobby and Bayley's relationship reaches a new strength, he has his doubts as he fears her head may turn if another ex enters the villa. Aaron puts his cards on the table for Dominika W, but she receives a friendly warning from Daisy to stay away from him. Elsewhere Scarlett and Nicky's feud continues, and Aaron rages when he hears that Daisy has been meddling in his business. Bayley is in for a shock when her ex George arrives at the beach to win her round, and things go from bad to worse for Bobby when he finds out that Bayley and George have kissed on their date.
76	4	"Episode 4"	5 September 2018	60 minutes	238,100
George ensures there's no way back for Bayley and Bobby's relationship after twisting the knife one last time, whilst Daisy makes it her mission to pursue a newly single Bobby. Scarlett feels out of the loop after failing to find a common ground with any of the girls, and Rhianne rages with Daisy for breaking “girl code”. Daisy is overjoyed by the arrival of her ex-boyfriend Matty B, and is quick to drop Bobby in the process. Elsewhere Aaron and Dominika W share a night of passion, Bobby and Bayley finally get closure, and Matty B sends Nicky and Scarlett packing.
77	5	"Episode 5"	12 September 2018	60 minutes	262,100
As Daisy plans her future with Matty B, she's left reeling when he tells her he doesn't feel the same way and wants to remain friends instead. Josiah comes out of his shell thanks to the arrival of his ex-holiday romance Angelica, but she's more interested in causing a wedge between Aaron and Dominika W. Meanwhile Daisy causes frustration for the girls after they grow tired of defending her only for it to be thrown back in their faces, and Matty and Natalee are forced into an awkward situation when Daisy gives them both an ultimatum.
78	6	"Episode 6"	19 September 2018	60 minutes	315,100
Natalee and Matty B ignore warnings from Daisy and decide to jump into bed with each other anyway. Bobby decides to get the upper hand over George when his ex-girlfriend Katie turns up on the beach, but she's more concerned as to why George has been getting with her former friend Bayley. The rift between Natalee and Daisy grows as Matty continues to come between them, whilst Aaron tries his luck with Angelica in front of Dominika W. Elsewhere Katie and George go head-to-head, Dominika W lashes out and Josiah has some choice words for Aaron.
79	7	"Episode 7"	26 September 2018	60 minutes	253,000
Daisy is delighted when her ex-boyfriend Sam turns up on the beach, only to be once again let down when he tells her he'd rather just be friends. Dominika W uses Sam's arrival to her advantage as she takes revenge on Aaron. Bad blood between Matty B and Sam causes ructions in the villa, whilst Bobby and Rhianne gravitate towards each other once again. Josiah fails to impress Daisy when they're sent on a date, and the Tablet of Terror delivers another shock with some video messages from home, where George's Mum is far from impressed to see Bayley back in her son's life.
80	8	"Episode 8"	3 October 2018	60 minutes	326,100
Matty B realises that he's falling for Natalee but can't see their relationship working outside of the villa, and Katie gives Josiah the boot. The girls go head-to-head as they all compete for Jack's attention, but George is left red faced when it's Bayley who he takes on a date. Elsewhere Natalee reaches breaking point, Aaron is fuming when he discovers Dominika W is head over heels for Jack, and Bayley and George's romance faces some turbulence following a game of truth or dare. Bobby revels in George's misery, and Daisy receives a night of passion.
81	9	"Episode 9"	10 October 2018	60 minutes	290,400
Daisy becomes public enemy number one again after waking up in Bobby's bed, whilst George and Bayley make their relationship official. Natalee lashes out at Daisy when she accuses her of having double standards during a heated debate about girl code. Elsewhere Sam and Angelica are sent home as a result of a “battle of the sexes” game, and Aaron gets touchy feely with his ex-fling Dominika O as she arrives on the beach. When footage of their date is sent to the villa, Dominika W sees red leaving her no choice but to confront Aaron – with brutal consequences.
82	10	"Episode 10"	17 October 2018	60 minutes	261,100
Daisy and Natalee's bitter feud reaches a new height when Daisy catches Natalee doing a brutal impression of her. Elsewhere Alicia is overcome with emotion when her ex-boyfriend Alex shows up on the beach in an attempt to rekindle their relationship, and Jack is sent home in a shock twist. Bayley begins to doubt George's loyalty when he notices a spark between him and Katie, Aaron and Dominika W work through their recent problems, and Daisy and Natalee finally call a truce. Alicia and Alex exchange and emotional heart-to-heart as she faces the difficult task of telling him she doesn't want to get back together with him.
83	11	"Episode 11"	24 October 2018	60 minutes	285,500
Bayley and George are faced with their toughest test to date when her very recent ex-boyfriend Rob shows up determined to give their relationship another go. Bayley has some serious explaining to do when Rob has questions about her antics in the villa. Elsewhere Dominika O and Aaron clash, and Natalee and Matty B realise they're head over heels for each other. Back at the villa, Alex calls Bayley out for playing Rob and George off against each other, and the competition for Bayley heats up before she makes her ultimate decision by deciding to stick with George, breaking Rob's heart in the process.
84	12	"Episode 12"	31 October 2018	60 minutes	260,200
On the final day in the villa, Aaron eventually opens up to Dominika W about his feelings towards her, and Natalee is a nervous wreck when she hears that Matty B's ex-fling Beth has arrived at the beach. The girls reminisce over the happy times, meanwhile Natalee isn't convinced when Matty B reassures her that there are no feelings there between him and Beth. As the couples make things official at the last supper, Natalee and Matty B's holiday romance comes to an abrupt end, and Daisy receives one final crushing blow when she finds out Bobby has gone to bed with Beth.

== Ratings ==
Episode	Date	MTV weekly rank	Total MTV viewers
Episode 1	15 August 2018	2	211,000
Episode 2	22 August 2018	2	180,000
Episode 3	29 August 2018	2	206,200
Episode 4	5 September 2018	3	238,100
Episode 5	12 September 2018	2	262,100
Episode 6	19 September 2018	1	315,100
Episode 7	26 September 2018	2	253,000
Episode 8	3 October 2018	2	326,100
Episode 9	10 October 2018	2	290,400
Episode 10	17 October 2018	3	261,100
Episode 11	24 October 2018	3	286,500
Episode 12	31 October 2018	2	261,200
Average viewers		2	257,400
