= Ex on the Beach (British TV series) series 7 =

Ex on the Beach
- Season 7
- No. of episodes: 10

Release
- Original network: MTV
- Original release: 20 June – 22 August 2017

Series chronology
- ← Previous; Series 6 Next → Series 8

The seventh series of Ex on the Beach, a British television programme that aired on 20 June 2017 on MTV. The group of cast for this series include Geordie Shore stars Chloe Ferry and Marty McKenna, Love Island contestants Max Morley and Josh Ritchie, as well as Beauty School Cop Outs cast member Savannah Kemplay. Star of series five David Hawley also featured in this series. Marty and Josh had also previously appeared in the third and sixth series of the show respectively.

== Cast ==
The official list of cast members were released on 23 May 2017. They included four men; Dean Ralph, Jordan Wright, Marty McKenna and Max Morley, and four girls: Che McSorley, Fatima Rull, Nicole Dutt and Savannah Kemplay. Marty has previously appeared in the third series of the show as well as featuring as a cast member on Geordie Shore, whereas Max won the first series of Love Island. Savannah also previously appeared in Beauty School Cop Outs. With the announcement of the line-up it was also confirmed that Marty's fellow Geordie Shore star Chloe Ferry would be arriving on the beach as an ex as well as Josh Ritchie, who is returning from the sixth series of the show. He also appeared alongside Max on Love Island. Star of the fifth series David Hawley will also be returning to the series.

All original cast members arrived at the beach during the first episode and were immediately told to prepare for the arrival of their exes. LeNicole was removed from the villa during the second episode after a violent altercation with Fatima, just missing out on Brad's arrival, her ex-boyfriend who also arrived during this episode. The third episode featured the debut of Georgia Crone, the ex-girlfriend of Max. Stevie Colley was the fifth ex to arrive, making her debut in episode five. She was the ex-girlfriend of Dean, who arrived wanting to potentially rekindle things. The fifth episode included the arrival of Chloe's ex-boyfriend Sam Scott. Che's twin sister Leonie McSorley also debuted during this episode despite not having an ex in the villa. During the sixth episode, Sydney Longmuir became the next human wrecking ball to arrive on the beach. She arrived as Jordan's ex-girlfriend wanting painful revenge. Georgia's next ex-boyfriend John Speed turned up during the seventh episode in a bid to win her back, and Brad was sent home after the Tablet of Terror gave her the option to send one of the boys home. Star of series 5, David Hawley returned to the beach during the eighth episode as the ex-boyfriend of Fatima, whilst Marty was given the option to send one couple home. He chose Jordan and Sydney. Sam Reece made his debut during the ninth episode where he arrived determined to get revenge on his ex-one night stand Georgia. The final ex to enter the villa was Love Island contestant and star of series 6, Josh Ritchie, the ex of both Che and Georgia. The Tablet of Terror also delivered its final blow to the cast, forcing Georgia to send one boy back into the sea. She chose Sam Reece.

- **Bold** indicates original cast member; all other cast were brought into the series as an ex.

Episodes	Name	Age (at start of series)	Hometown	Exes
10	**Che McSorley**	19	Aberdeen	Josh Ritchie, Lee Moran
10	**Dean Ralph**	28	London	Stevie Coiley
10	**Fatima Rull**	25	Manchester	David Hawley
8	**Jordan Wright †**	24	Essex	Sydney Longmuir
10	**Marty McKenna**	22	Newcastle	Chloe Ferry
10	**Max Morley**	24	Huddersfield	Georgia Crone
2	**Nicole Dutt**	21	Birmingham	Brad Hayward
6	**Savannah Kemplay**	23	Leeds	—N/a
10	Lee Moran	24	Dublin	Che McSorley
10	Chloe Ferry	21	Newcastle	Marty McKenna, Sam Scott
6	Brad Hayward	25	Birmingham	Nicole Dutt
8	Georgia Crone	21	Liverpool	John Speed, Josh Ritchie, Max Morley, Sam Reece
7	Stevie Coiley	20	Brighton	Dean Ralph
6	Sam Scott	22	Northampton	Chloe Ferry
6	Leonie McSorley	19	Aberdeen	—N/a
3	Sydney Longmuir	20	Essex	Jordan Wright
4	John Speed	25	Liverpool	Georgia Crone
3	David Hawley	26	Newcastle	Fatima Rull
2	Sam Reece	24	Sheffield	Georgia Crone
1	Josh Ritchie	22	Bolton	Che McSorley, Georgia Crone

=== Duration of cast ===
Cast members	Episodes									
Cast members	1	2	3	4	5	6	7	8	9	10
Che										
Dean										
Fatima										
Jordan										
Marty										
Max										
Nicole										
Savannah										
Lee										
Chloe										
Brad										
Georgia										
Stevie										
Sam S										
Leonie										
Sydney										
John										
Hawley										
Sam R										
Josh										

Table Key
Key: = "Cast member" is featured in this episode
Key: = "Cast member" arrives on the beach
Key: = "Cast member" has an ex arrive on the beach
Key: = "Cast member" arrives on the beach and has an ex arrive during the same episode
Key: = "Cast member" leaves the beach
Key: = "Cast member" has an ex arrive on the beach and leaves during the same episode
Key: = "Cast member" arrives on the beach and leaves during the same episode
Key: = "Cast member" does not feature in this episode

== Episodes ==
No. overall	No. in season	Title	Original release date	Duration	UK viewers
55	1	"Episode 1"	20 June 2017	60 minutes	606,000
A new set of singles arrive on the beach but are instantly thrown into a spin when they discover that the arrival of one of their exes is imminent. Marty and Fatima fall head over heels for each other, whilst Dean and Savannah grow increasingly closer. Che is left broken when her ex-boyfriend Lee turns up for revenge, and her day goes from bad to worse when she clashes with Dean over her past. Nicole and Fatima come to blows, and Dean is torn over whether to pursue Savannah or Che. Elsewhere, Fatima is pushed aside when Marty's ex-girlfriend Chloe arrives on the beach.
56	2	"Episode 2"	27 June 2017	60 minutes	549,000
Chloe is devastated to learn that Marty has been getting with Fatima in the villa, but he soon puts an end to it. Nicole unleashes her anger out on Fatima, but one fight too many leaves security no choice but to remove her from the villa. Brad arrives as Nicole's ex shocked to hear about her behaviour, and Jordan stirs the pot between Dean, Che and Savannah. After being honest about her feelings towards Marty, Chloe is left in a state of shock when he catches him kissing Savannah – but she plays him at his own games by hopping into bed with Jordan.
57	3	"Episode 3"	4 July 2017	60 minutes	532,000
Chloe begins to regret using Jordan to make Marty jealous as it only draws him closer to Savannah. Max is overcome with emotions when his ex-girlfriend Georgia shows up on the beach with a score to settle. As Georgia's story falls apart, everybody except Dean turns against her. Savannah agrees to keep her brief fling with Marty a secret, but it's Chloe who he ends up running back to. Max is on edge when he fears Dean is going to snatch Georgia from his grasp, and tension boils once again between Chloe and Marty.
58	4	"Episode 4"	11 July 2017	60 minutes	584,000
Che finally makes up her mind and decides to pursue Dean, only to receive a further setback when his ex-girlfriend Stevie arrives potentially wanting to rekindle things. Georgia's insecurities put a spanner in the works for her and Max as she fears Stevie may be taking his attention, whilst Dean considers going back with his ex – but is left shocked when she kisses Jordan instead. Marty continues to kiss Savannah in secret knowing things will blow up if Chloe finds out. Elsewhere Dean and Che finally seal the deal.
59	5	"Episode 5"	18 July 2017	60 minutes	489,000
The love triangle between Dean, Che and Stevie continues but after it all ends in tears, the girls decide to team up against him. The arrival of Chloe's ex-boyfriend Sam S causes Marty to erupt when the pair come face-to-face for the first time. Not long after kissing Max, Georgia is caught kissing Lee causing the former couple to come to blows. Che is delighted when her twin sister turns up at the villa, whilst Marty unleashes further angry when he discovers Sam S and Chloe have had a fall-out. Elsewhere Savannah is left red faced when her secret passion with Marty is revealed.
60	6	"Episode 6"	25 July 2017	60 minutes	565,000
After agreeing to give things another go with Sam S, Chloe is forced into a difficult conversation with Marty. Jordan is delighted when his ex-girlfriend Sydney arrives on the beach, but she's only got revenge on her mind. Stevie is granted with the power to send somebody home and opts with Savannah. Chloe and Sam S's turbulent relationship hits the rocks again when she feels he's not giving her any attention, whilst Brad and Georgia grow closer. Elsewhere Sydney finally gives into temptation and agrees to give Jordan a second chance.
61	7	"Episode 7"	1 August 2017	60 minutes	516,000
Max is torn between Leonie and Stevie, but it's Leonie who he's sent on a date with. Georgia assures Brad that she will stick with him even if her ex arrives on the beach, but she's immediately tested when her ex-boyfriend John shows up. Stevie wastes no time in telling John what Georgia has been up to, and Leonie and Max grow even closer. Elsewhere Georgia drops Brad after deciding to get back with John, and she's forced to send one of them home after the Tablet of Terror dishes out another devilish twist. But just before Brad is sent packing, he unleashes his fury towards John.
62	8	"Episode 8"	8 August 2017	60 minutes	469,000
Georgia and John's turbulent relationship is the talk of the villa, whilst Fatima is thrilled to see her ex-boyfriend Hawley arrive on the villa. Hawley takes an instant liking to Stevie, which rubs Dean up the wrong way. After spending the night with Hawley, Stevie is left red faced when he kisses Fatima on a date. Sam S walks in on an intimate moment between Chloe and Marty, and the Tablet of Terror's latest twist spells bad news for Jordan and Sydney as the pair of them are sent packing. Elsewhere Hawley chooses Stevie, much to the annoyance of Fatima.
63	9	"Episode 9"	15 August 2017	60 minutes	Unknown
Leonie's feelings for Max grow but she's unaware that he's only in it for the fun. Marty and Sam S continue to bicker over Chloe, whilst Georgia is rocked by the arrival of the next ex. Sam R's shows up determined to get revenge on Georgia, but it's John who he clashes with as he sticks up for his girlfriend. Che and Leonie come to blows as they compete for the men in the villa, but despite being rejected twice by Max, Leonie still ends up in bed with him. Elsewhere Chloe loses her temper when Sam S refuses to have sex with her, and John and Georgia's relationship is tested.
64	10	"Episode 10"	22 August 2017	60 minutes	414,000
Already anxious of the amount of Georgia's exes living in the villa, John is hit with further disappointment when Josh arrives hoping to win her back. Sam R is sent packing when the Tablet of Terror delivers one final blow to the cast, Che wastes no time in stirring the pot between John and Georgia, whilst Chloe and Marty take a trip down memory lane. As Josh and Georgia enter the villa hand in hand, the villa explodes when they jump to John's defence. Sam S finally gives into temptation with Chloe, but is left red faced when he later catches her with Marty.

== Ratings ==
Episode	Date	Official MTV rating	MTV weekly rank	Official MTV+1 rating	Total MTV viewers
Episode 1	20 June 2017	576,000	1	30,000	606,000
Episode 2	27 June 2017	519,000	1	30,000	549,000
Episode 3	4 July 2017	518,000	1	14,000	532,000
Episode 4	11 July 2017	573,000	1	11,000	584,000
Episode 5	18 July 2017	468,000	1	21,000	489,000
Episode 6	25 July 2017	544,000	1	21,000	565,000
Episode 7	1 August 2017	495,000	1	21,000	516,000
Episode 8	8 August 2017	454,000	1	15,000	469,000
Episode 9	15 August 2017	—N/a	—N/a	—N/a	—N/a
Episode 10	22 August 2017	406,000	1	8,000	414,000
Average viewers		506,000	1	19,000	525,000
