= Ex on the Beach (British TV series) series 2 =

Ex on the Beach
- Season 2
- No. of episodes: 8

Release
- Original network: MTV
- Original release: 27 January – 17 March 2015

Series chronology
- ← Previous; Series 1 Next → Series 3

The second series of Ex on the Beach, a British television programme, began airing on 27 January 2015 on MTV. The series concluded on 17 March 2015 after 8 episodes. The series was confirmed in July 2014 when it was announced that filming would begin soon. Exes for this series included stars of Geordie Shore Charlotte Crosby and Gary Beadle.

Rogan O'Connor later returned to the beach during the third series, this time as an ex. Gary and Jess both returned to the fifth "All-Star" series as main cast, whilst Ashley, Kayleigh and Melissa also returned as exes. Kayleigh also went on to appear in the eighteenth series of Big Brother, but was removed from the house on Day 13 due to threatening behaviour. In 2018, Jess Impiazzi, an ex during this series went onto appear in the twenty-first series of Celebrity Big Brother. Kayleigh and Ashley went to become competitors in MTV’s The Challenge. Rogan later won season 34 of the show War of the Worlds 2 and Melissa was a finalist in the 35th season Total Madness but withdrew from the final as she was pregnant. Rogan O'Connor returned for the fourth season of Celebrity Ex on the Beach.

== Cast ==
The official list of cast members was released on 6 January 2015 and includes four single boys; Connor Hunter, Luke Goodfellow, Morgan Evans and Rogan O'Connor, as well as four single girls; Anita Kaushik, Kayleigh Morris, Loren Green and Melissa Reeves. It was also announced that Geordie Shore stars Charlotte Crosby and Gary Beadle would be taking part in the series as exes. Ahead of the launch of the new series, it was confirmed that Series 1 cast member Ashley Cain would be returning for the second series as an ex.

All of the official cast members arrived on the beach during the first episode, but were immediately told that they would be soon joined by their exes. During the first episode of the series, Kayleigh's ex-boyfriend Adam Gabriel arrived to stir things up, and Connor's ex-girlfriend Megan Clark was also introduced wanting to rekindle their romance. Rogan's ex-girlfriend model Jess Impiazzi arrived during the second episode. Jess had previously appeared briefly during an episode of the seventh series of The Only Way Is Essex. After getting together in the house, Anita and Rogan's brief fling ended and they were officially added to each other's ex-list. During the third episode, after a lot of anticipation, Gary Beadle arrived on the beach as Melissa's ex-fling. Anita's ex-boyfriend Joe Chandler turned up on the beach during the fourth episode in an attempt to win her back, whilst Geordie Shore's Charlotte Crosby arrived during the fifth coming face-to-face with her ex Gary. Danielle Abbott received a warm welcome from ex-boyfriend Luke when she made her first appearance in the sixth episode, and Ashley Cain returned to the beach during the seventh episode as the ex-Emily. Ashley had previously appeared in the first series.

- **Bold** indicates original cast member; all other cast were brought into the series as an ex.

Episodes	Name	Age (at start of series)	Hometown	Exes
8	**Anita Kaushik**	22	London	Joe Chandler, Rogan O'Connor
8	**Connor Hunter**	18	Essex	Megan Clark
8	**Kayleigh Morris**	26	Wales/London	Adam Gabriel
8	**Loren Green**	23	Walsall	—N/a
8	**Luke Goodfellow**	22	Cardiff	Danielle Abbott
8	**Melissa Reeves**	22	Liverpool	Gary Beadle
8	**Morgan Evans**	26	Birmingham	Emily Colley
8	**Rogan O'Connor**	25	Stratford-upon-Avon	Anita Kaushik, Emily Colley, Jess Impiazzi
8	Adam Gabriel	23	London	Kayleigh Morris
8	Megan Clark	19	Essex	Connor Hunter
7	Jess Impiazzi	25	Surrey	Rogan O'Connor
6	Gary Beadle	26	Newcastle	Charlotte Crosby, Emily Colley, Melissa Reeves
6	Emily Colley	24	Worcestershire	Ashley Cain, Gary Beadle, Morgan Evans, Rogan O'Connor
5	Joe Chandler	22	Surrey	Anita Kaushik
4	Charlotte Crosby	24	Sunderland	Gary Beadle
3	Danielle Abbott	22	Reading	Luke Goodfellow
2	Ashley Cain	23	Nuneaton	Emily Colley

=== Duration of cast ===
Cast members	Episodes							
Cast members	1	2	3	4	5	6	7	8
Anita								
Connor								
Kayleigh								
Loren								
Luke								
Melissa								
Morgan								
Rogan								
Adam								
Megan								
Jess								
Gary								
Emily								
Joe								
Charlotte								
Danielle								
Ashley								

Table Key
Key: = "Cast member" is featured in this episode
Key: = "Cast member" arrives on the beach
Key: = "Cast member" has an ex arrive on the beach
Key: = "Cast member" arrives on the beach and has an ex arrive during the same episode
Key: = "Cast member" does not feature in this episode

== Episodes ==
No. overall	No. in season	Title	Original release date	Duration	UK viewers
9	1	"Episode 1"	27 January 2015	60 minutes	451,000
As a new group of singles arrive on the beach and are instantly hit with the news that their exes are on their way. Anita and Kayleigh find themselves competing for Rogan's attention, and Kayleigh is delighted when she manages to get Rogan into the penthouse, but she's left reeling after the pair clash and he ends up getting with Anita. There's devastation in the villa as Kayleigh's ex-boyfriend Adam shows up at the beach to cause trouble, and just as Connor and Melissa begin to grow close, his ex-girlfriend Megan arrives with an axe to grind.
10	2	"Episode 2"	3 February 2015	60 minutes	570,000
Tensions rise between Megan and Melissa when Megan tries to win Connor back, unaware he wants nothing to do with her. Connor loses his cool when he spots Morgan trying to muscle in on his new romance with Melissa, whilst Anita and Rogan get passionate. The arrival of Rogan's ex-girlfriend Jess leaves a bad taste in Anita's mouth and she's confused by Rogan's sudden U-turn, and Adam deliberately causes trouble for Kayleigh before jumping into bed with Loren. Rogan and Jess share a heart-to-heart, and Loren is baffled by her feelings for Adam fearing how Kayleigh will react.
11	3	"Episode 3"	10 February 2015	60 minutes	661,000
Anita puts on a brave face after witnessing Jess and Rogan together again, whilst Lauren is petrified of telling Kayleigh the truth about her kiss with Adam. Jess quickly realises Rogan hasn't been entirely honest with her, and the tension between Connor and Morgan increases. The villa is turned upside down as Melissa's former flame Gary turns up to stir things, and they're instantly joined by Emily – who already has three exes residing in the villa. Melissa is quick to turn her back on Connor following Gary's arrival, and Jess is distraught when Rogan's attention turns to Emily.
12	4	"Episode 4"	17 February 2015	60 minutes	839,000
Kayleigh finds herself getting angry again when she catches Adam and Emily getting close. Despite being hurt by Rogan's recent behaviour, Jess ends up in his bed once again. Adam feels isolated when the girls gang up to force him out of the villa for Kayleigh's sake, and his day goes from bad to worse when he finds out that Connor has also kissed Emily. Just as she's starting to get closer to Gary, Anita is knocked for six when her ex-boyfriend Joe arrives on the beach. Adam makes a huge gesture to the group in an attempt to gain their forgiveness.
13	5	"Episode 5"	24 February 2015	60 minutes	747,000
Anita is in pieces following the arrival of her ex-boyfriend, and dreads telling him the truth about her and Gary, but Kayleigh revels in Anita's misery as she accidentally tells him the truth. Jess is disappointed for allowing herself to go back to Rogan, but when her back is turned he makes a move on Megan. Joe and Anita clash when the truth about Gary is out in the open – but there's further heartbreak when he discovers she's also slept with Rogan. Elsewhere, Kayleigh and Adam go on another awkward date, and Charlotte turns up on the beach.
14	6	"Episode 6"	3 March 2015	60 minutes	927,000
Jess is all out for revenge after discovering Rogan has kissed Megan, and uses his best friend Morgan as a pawn. Charlotte and Adam get close as they go on a romantic date together, whilst Rogan and Morgan fallout after the reveal of another secret kiss. Kayleigh rages when she catches Adam in bed with Charlotte, but there's further confrontation when Psycho Charlotte is unleashed. Luke is greeted by his ex-girlfriend Danielle who it out to rekindle their love, and Rogan is happy as Morgan puts their friendship before Jess.
15	7	"Episode 7"	10 March 2015	60 minutes	710,000
Kayleigh tells Charlotte that she's still in love with Adam whilst Rogan finally realises he has strong feelings for Jess. Ashley makes his return to the beach as Emily's ex, but immediately hits it off with Kayleigh. Despite Gary telling Ashley that Anita is out of bounds, it doesn't stop him from trying his luck with her causing huge friction in the villa. Kayleigh is smitten after spending the night with Ashley, but his attention turns to Melissa the following day. The girls scrap over their mutual feelings towards Ashley, and Rogan and Jess reconcile.
16	8	"Episode 8"	17 March 2015	60 minutes	791,000
Melissa and Kayleigh's on-going feud continues when the topic of Ashley is brought up for discussion. Charlotte and Gaz reminisce over old times, whilst Melissa apologises to Connor for the way she's been treating him. The group's final banquet descends into chaos when a drunk Anita clashes with Ashley, Joe and Gary. Connor finally gets Melissa into bed, and Anita and Gary have make up sex. The tablet of terror has one last surprise for the cast with one final trip to the beach, whose ex is next?

== Ratings ==
Episode	Date	Official MTV rating	MTV weekly rank	Official MTV+1 rating	Total MTV viewers
Episode 1	27 January 2015	426,000	1	25,000	451,000
Episode 2	3 February 2015	549,000	1	21,000	570,000
Episode 3	10 February 2015	623,000	1	38,000	661,000
Episode 4	17 February 2015	799,000	1	40,000	839,000
Episode 5	24 February 2015	721,000	1	26,000	747,000
Episode 6	3 March 2015	821,000	1	106,000	927,000
Episode 7	10 March 2015	641,000	1	69,000	710,000
Episode 8	17 March 2015	707,000	1	84,000	791,000
Average viewers		661,000	1	51,000	712,000
