= Josh Ritchie =

English television personality (born 1994)

Joshua Ritchie
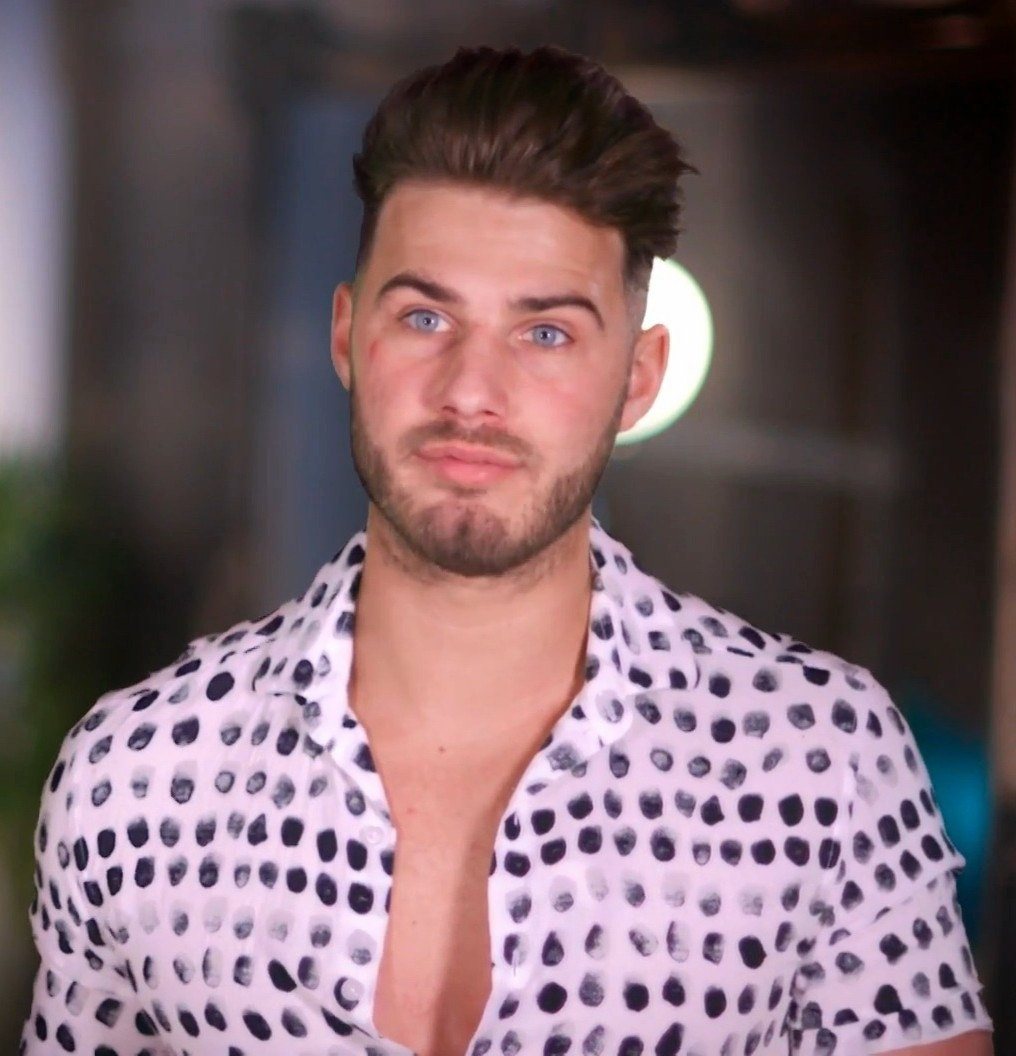
- Ritchie in 2019
- Born: Joshua Harry Ritchie; 21 May 1994 (age 32); Bolton, Greater Manchester, England
- Occupation: Television personality
- Years active: 2015–present
- Known for: Love Island; Ex on the Beach

Joshua Harry Ritchie (born 21 May 1994) is an English television personality. Since 2015, Ritchie has been a popular and well received personality with appearances on reality shows such as Love Island, Ex on the Beach, Celebrity Coach Trip, Celebs Go Dating, Just Tattoo of Us, The Charlotte Show and most recently Love Island: All Stars.

== Personal life ==
Ritchie is from Bolton. His sister is Michaela Wain, a candidate on the thirteenth series of The Apprentice. In 2018, Ritchie was in a relationship with Charlotte Crosby. According to media reports, they broke up on 17 November 2019.

Ritchie is currently dating Sophie Piper, half-sister of presenter, Rochelle Humes, whom he met on Love Island: All Stars.

== Career ==
Ritchie was on the 2015 series of Love Island and the sixth and seventh series of Ex On The Beach. In 2018, Ritchie presented two episodes of Just Tattoo of Us alongside girlfriend Charlotte Crosby. In 2019, they were contestants on the fourth series of Celebrity Coach Trip. The pair came second. In 2020, Ritchie joined OnlyFans to upload X-rated content, which he discussed on Getting Filthy Rich with Olivia Attwood. In 2024 Ritchie was a contestant on Love Island: All Stars in which he made the final and finished in third place with fellow Islander Sophie Piper having received 15% of the public votes.

== Filmography ==
As himself
Year	Title	Notes
2015	Love Island	Contestant, finished in third place
2016–2017	Ex on the Beach	Sixth and seventh series
2018–2019	The Charlotte Show	Main role
2018	Just Tattoo of Us	Guest presenter, 2 episodes
2019	Celebrity Coach Trip	Contestant
2019–2020	Celebs Go Dating	Seventh and eighth series
2021	Celeb Ex in the City	Main role; Series 2
2022	Getting Filthy Rich	OnlyFans creator
2024	Love Island: All Stars	Contestant, finished in third place
