= Ex on the Beach (British TV series) series 11 =

Ex on the Beach
- Series 11
- No. of episodes: 10

Release
- Original network: MTV
- Original release: 9 May – 11 July 2023

Series chronology
- ← Previous; Series 9

The eleventh and final series of Ex on the Beach, a British television programme began on 9 May 2023, The cast members for this series features First Dates waiter Grant Urquhart, Geordie Shore: Hot Single Summer star Chloe Adams, and Are You the One? UK stars Charlie Hannam, Natasha Daisy, and Theadora Thompson. This series introduced "The One That Got Away Getaway," in which cast members were tasked with deciding if they should give their ex-partner another chance. This was the first civilian series to heavily feature LGBTQ+ contestants. Featuring the first original LGBTQ+ male contestant to receive an ex arrival, George Bebbington and the first lesbian cast member of the civilian series Abbey Myers.

== Cast ==
The original cast members included five men; Charlie Hannam, George Bebbington, Grant Urquhart, Junior Raji, and Ollie Large, and five women; Charlotte Howden, Chloe Adams, Deborah Famodun, Emily Hopkins, and Nadia Pointing.

- **Bold** indicates original cast member; all other cast were brought into the series as an ex.

Episodes	Name	Age	Location	Exes
10	**Charlie Hannam**	23	Dorset	Jessie-Mae Begg, Natasha Daisy, Theadora Thompson
10	**Charlotte Howden**	24	Plymouth	Terique Henry
10	**Chloe Adams**	23	Wales	Abbey Myers
7	**Deborah 'Debs' Famodun**	25	London	
7	**Emily Hopkins**	27	Derby	Wendale De Jesus
5	**George Bebbington**	21	Runcorn / Liverpool	Alessandro
10	**Grant Urquhart**	28	York	Nadia Zarine
10	**Junior Raji**	26	London	
10	**Nadia 'Nads' Pointing**	23	Manchester	Ozan Ozturk
10	**Oliver 'Ollie' Large**	30	Bexhill-on-Sea	Liam Redmond
5	Alessandro			George Bebbington
7	Wendale De Jesus	28	Derby	Emily Hopkins
9	Nadia Zarine	28	York	Grant Urquhart
8	Ozan 'Ozzie' Ozturk	30	Chingford	Nadia Pointing
7	Liam Redmond	30	London	Oliver Large
5	Jay Munro	27	Glasgow	Alexis Bailey
6	Natasha 'Tasha' Daisy	22	Bristol	Charlie Hannam
3	Theadora 'Thea' Thompson	23	London	Charlie Hannam
2	Abbey Myers	23	Limerick / Manchester	Chloe Adams
3	Alexis Bailey	22	Preston	Jay Munro
3	Terique 'Tee' Henry	28	Plymouth	Charlotte Howden
2	Jessie-Mae 'Jess' Begg	20	London	Charlie Hannam

=== Duration of cast ===
Cast members	Episodes									
Cast members	1	2	3	4	5	6	7	8	9	10
Charlie										
Charlotte										
Chloe										
Deborah										
Emily										
George										
Grant										
Junior										
Nadia P.										
Ollie										
Alessandro										
Wendale										
Nadia Z.										
Ozzie										
Liam										
Jay										
Tasha										
Thea										
Abbey										
Alexis										
Tee										
Jess										

Table Key
Key: = "Cast member" is featured in this episode
Key: = "Cast member" arrives on the beach
Key: = "Cast member" has an ex arrive on the beach
Key: = "Cast member" has two exes arrive on the beach
Key: = "Cast member" arrives on the beach and has an ex arrive during the same episode
Key: = "Cast member" leaves the beach
Key: = "Cast member" has an ex arrive on the beach and leaves during the same episode
Key: = "Cast member" does not feature in this episode

== Episodes ==
No. overall	No. in season	Title	Original release date	Duration
85	1	"Episode 1"	9 May 2023	60 minutes
86	2	"Episode 2"	16 May 2023	60 minutes
87	3	"Episode 3"	23 May 2023	60 minutes
88	4	"Episode 4"	30 May 2023	60 minutes
89	5	"Episode 5"	6 June 2023	60 minutes
90	6	"Episode 6"	13 June 2023	60 minutes
91	7	"Episode 7"	20 June 2023	60 minutes
92	8	"Episode 8"	27 June 2023	60 minutes
93	9	"Episode 9"	4 July 2023	60 minutes
94	10	"Episode 10"	11 July 2023	60 minutes

== Reception ==
Despite his early exit from the show, George was recognized in Liverpool Echo's 2023 Rainbow List, celebrating LGBTQ+ figures from Liverpool. George was featured for not conforming to LGBTQ+ stereotypes and showcasing there is more than one way to be gay.
