= Ex on the Beach (British TV series) series 8 =

Ex on the Beach
- Season 8
- No. of episodes: 8

Release
- Original network: MTV
- Original release: 20 March – 8 May 2018

Series chronology
- ← Previous; Series 7 Next → Series 9

The eighth series of Ex on the Beach, a British television programme premiered on 20 March 2018. The series was confirmed in August 2017. The cast members for this series were confirmed on 20 February 2018, and includes Geordie Shore star Marnie Simpson as well as The X Factor contestant, and Stereo Kicks and Union J singer Casey Johnson.

== Cast ==
The official list of cast members was released on 20 February 2018. They include four boys; Marcel Stevens, Sam Lonsdale, Tom Litten and Zach Tull, and four girls: Charlotte Hughes, Katie Champ, Marnie Simpson and Sofia Filipe. Marnie has previously appeared as a cast member on Geordie Shore. With the announcement of the line-up it was also confirmed that Marnie's ex-boyfriend and former Stereo Kicks and Union J singer Casey Johnson would be arriving on the beach as an ex, as well as Kyle Walker. They had all previously appeared together on MTV's Single AF. Former Ibiza Weekender cast member Laura Louise will also feature as an ex.

All original cast members arrived at the beach during the first episode and were immediately told to prepare for the arrival of their exes. However, in a further twist, Kurtis Hartman turned up at the villa to join the cast. Lorna Boswell became the first ex to turn up on the beach desperate for revenge on her ex-boyfriend Tom. Sofia was delivered a double blow during the second episode when two of her exes, Joe Angus and Mikey Speakman both arrived on the beach. The Tablet of Terror later revealed that both were on borrowed time with Sofia having the ultimate decision of which one to send home. She chose Mikey. Becky Taylor, the ex-girlfriend of Zach also arrived during this episode. The third episode featured the arrival of Union J singer Casey Johnson, who turned up as the ex-boyfriend of Marnie. Another of her exes, Kyle Walker turned up on the beach during the fourth episode, as well as Lorna's ex-fling Bibi Machin. Marnie was also given the tough decision to send somebody home. She chose Sam. The next human wrecking ball to arrive at the beach was former Ibiza Weekender cast member Laura Louise, who is the ex-girlfriend of Marcel. She turned up during the fifth episode, as well as Gino Antonio, the ex-boyfriend of Charlotte. Tom was also sent packing during this episode after Bibi was given the power to send somebody home. Kurtis was the next cast member to leave the villa, this time during the sixth episode. This episode also featured the arrival of Marcel's second ex-girlfriend Bea Tetteh. The pair later decided to voluntarily leave the villa after reconciling. Becky's ex-boyfriend Aaron McLeod made his arrival during the seventh episode, which also featured Bibi deciding to pack her bags after one too many rejections. The eighth episode featured the arrival of the final ex, Emily Wise, who turned up hoping to get closure from her ex-boyfriend Kyle.

- **Bold** indicates original cast member; all other cast were brought into the series as an ex.

Episodes	Name	Age (at start of series)	Hometown	Exes
8	**Charlotte Hughes**	24	Essex	Gino Antonio
8	**Katie Champ**	24	South Wales	—N/a
6	**Kurtis Hartman**	21	Essex	—N/a
6	**Marcel Stevens**	25	Manchester	Bea Tetteh, Laura Louise
8	**Marnie Simpson**	26	Newcastle	Casey Johnson, Kyle Walker
4	**Sam Lonsdale**	20	Liverpool	—N/a
8	**Sofia Filipe**	21	London	Joe Angus, Mikey Speakman
5	**Tom Litten**	24	Somerset	Lorna Boswell
8	**Zach Tull**	23	Reading	Becky Taylor
8	Lorna Boswell	21	Sheffield	Bibi Machin, Tom Litten
7	Joe Angus	22	Newcastle	Sofia Filipe
1	Mikey Speakman	22	Blackpool	Sofia Filipe
7	Becky Taylor	23	Reading	Aaron Mcleod, Zach Tull
6	Casey Johnson	22	London	Marnie Simpson
5	Kyle Walker	22	Newcastle	Emily Wise, Marnie Simpson
4	Bibi Machin	21	Sheffield	Lorna Boswell
4	Laura Louise	28	Newcastle	Marcel Stevens
4	Gino Antonio	26	Essex	Charlotte Hughes
1	Bea Tetteh	25	Sheffield	Marcel Stevens
2	Aaron McLeod	26	Reading	Becky Taylor
1	Emily Wise	22	Newcastle	Kyle Walker

=== Duration of cast ===
Cast members	Episodes							
Cast members	1	2	3	4	5	6	7	8
Charlotte								
Katie								
Kurtis								
Marcel								
Marnie								
Sam								
Sofia								
Tom								
Zach								
Lorna								
Joe								
Mikey								
Becky								
Casey								
Kyle								
Bibi								
Laura								
Gino								
Bea								
Aaron								
Emily								

Table Key
Key: = "Cast member" is featured in this episode
Key: = "Cast member" arrives on the beach
Key: = "Cast member" has an ex arrive on the beach
Key: = "Cast member" has two exes arrive on the beach
Key: = "Cast member" arrives on the beach and has an ex arrive during the same episode
Key: = "Cast member" leaves the beach
Key: = "Cast member" has an ex arrive on the beach and leaves during the same episode
Key: = "Cast member" arrives on the beach and leaves during the same episode
Key: = "Cast member" does not feature in this episode

== Episodes ==
No. overall	No. in season	Title	Original release date	Duration	UK viewers
65	1	"Episode 1"	20 March 2018	60 minutes	525,000
A new bunch of sexy singles arrive on the beach of doom, and it doesn't take long for Charlotte to get tongues wagging. Following a kiss with Zach, Sofia rages with him for getting cocky in front of the boys when they get back to the villa. The group are shocked with the arrival of Kurtis, whilst Sam and Zach go head-to-head to get Charlotte's affection. Tom is knocked for six when his ex-girlfriend Lorna turns up wanting revenge. Katie is red faced when Kurtis chooses Marnie over her, and Sam and Zach come to blows.
66	2	"Episode 2"	27 March 2018	60 minutes	408,000
Charlotte decides to make Zach work for her affections, whilst Marnie drops a bomb on Kurtis by revealing she is still harbouring feelings for her ex. Sofia is delivered a double blow when two of her exes, Joe and Mikey arrive on the beach, but the Tablet of Terror adds further turmoil by revealing they're both on borrowed time. Lorna and Tom continue to bicker, and Zach and Charlotte's blossoming romance hits a bump in the road with the arrival of his ex-girlfriend Becky. Becky wastes no time in filling Charlotte in about Zach's past, and Sofia sends Mikey home.
67	3	"Episode 3"	3 April 2018	60 minutes	429,000
Marnie is on edge when her ex-boyfriend Casey shows up with unfinished business, and she's livid when Becky and Marcel can't resist telling him what she's been up to in the villa. After breaking things off with Charlotte, Zach sets his sights on an unsuspecting Katie. Lorna drops a bombshell on Tom, leaving a bleak future for the pair, meanwhile Katie is left publicly humiliated when Zach throws her in front of the bus. Casey and Marnie reach a good place, whilst the girls turn against Zach when his true colours are exposed.
68	4	"Episode 4"	10 April 2018	60 minutes	464,000
Marnie faces a tough decision when she's forced to send somebody home, and Sam is the one who has to pack his bags. Charlotte is delighted when Marnie's ex-fling Kyle rocks up looking for love, and the pair instantly hit it off much to the despair of Zach. Lorna's ex Bibi is the next human wrecking ball to show up at the villa and quickly causes trouble for her and Tom. Elsewhere Zach and Kyle clash, and Bibi and Tom desperately fight to win Lorna's affections. Kyle begins to have second thoughts about Charlotte after seeing her getting too drunk.
69	5	"Episode 5"	17 April 2018	60 minutes	488,000
The ongoing feud between Tom and Bibi continues with Lorna stuck in the middle. Elsewhere Katie and Kyle get close on a date, and Marcel's ex-girlfriend makes a dramatic entrance to the beach making a lot of enemies in the process. Tom is sent packing when Bibi is given the power to send somebody home, the drama escalates between Marcel and Laura after he takes Bibi on a date, and Zach makes it his mission to get into the penthouse with a girl. Charlotte is delighted with the arrival of her ex-boyfriend Gino, and Becky flips her lid after walking in on Laura and Zach getting cosy.
70	6	"Episode 6"	24 April 2018	60 minutes	504,000
Kurtis leaves the villa when Marnie is forced into another difficult decision. Marcel is exposed as a cheat when Laura throws him under the bus after his ex-girlfriend Bea turns up on the beach to reconcile with him. Gino tries his luck with both Lorna and Bibi behind each other's back. Finally seeing his true colours, Bibi and Laura team up against Marcel but are shocked when Bea is willing to take him back. Becky receives closure when she discovers Zach and Laura have slept together, but it's not long before Charlotte falls under his spell again. Elsewhere Marcel and Bea decide to pack their bags, and Lorna refuses Gino's advances.
71	7	"Episode 7"	1 May 2018	60 minutes	546,000
Bibi can't believe her luck when Gino tries to graft her, whilst Becky is knocked for six when her ex-boyfriend Aaron arrives at the beach to reconcile. Desperate for revenge, Marnie wastes no time in letting Aaron know what Becky has been up to in the villa, and Gino's head is turned when Laura offers him some attention. Bibi decides she's been dropped one too many times as she leaves the villa for good. Zach and Charlotte are drawn to each other once again, Gino scuppers his chances with Laura, and Aaron and Becky rekindle their relationship.
72	8	"Episode 8"	8 May 2018	60 minutes	505,000
As Kyle and Katie struggle to keep their hands off each other, his ex-girlfriend Emily shows up sending shockwaves round the villa. Charlotte and Zach face further woes when she lashes out after having one too many drinks, and Marnie comforts a heartbroken Emily. Kyle is forced to choose between a girl he once cared about, or the chance to pursue things with Katie, whilst Zach comes to a realisation surrounding Becky. Lorna fails to take Gino seriously when he tries to crack on with her. On the last night, an awards night descends into chaos.

== Ratings ==
Episode	Date	Official MTV rating	MTV weekly rank	Official MTV+1 rating	Total MTV viewers
Episode 1	20 March 2018	511,000	1	14,000	525,000
Episode 2	27 March 2018	407,000	1	1,000	408,000
Episode 3	3 April 2018	429,000	1		429,000
Episode 4	10 April 2018	464,000	1		464,000
Episode 5	17 April 2018	486,000	1	2,000	488,000
Episode 6	24 April 2018	503,000	1	1,000	504,000
Episode 7	1 May 2018	542,000	1	4,000	546,000
Episode 8	8 May 2018	502,000	1	3,000	505,000
Average viewers		480,000	1	4,000	484,000
