= Gaz Beadle =

British television personality

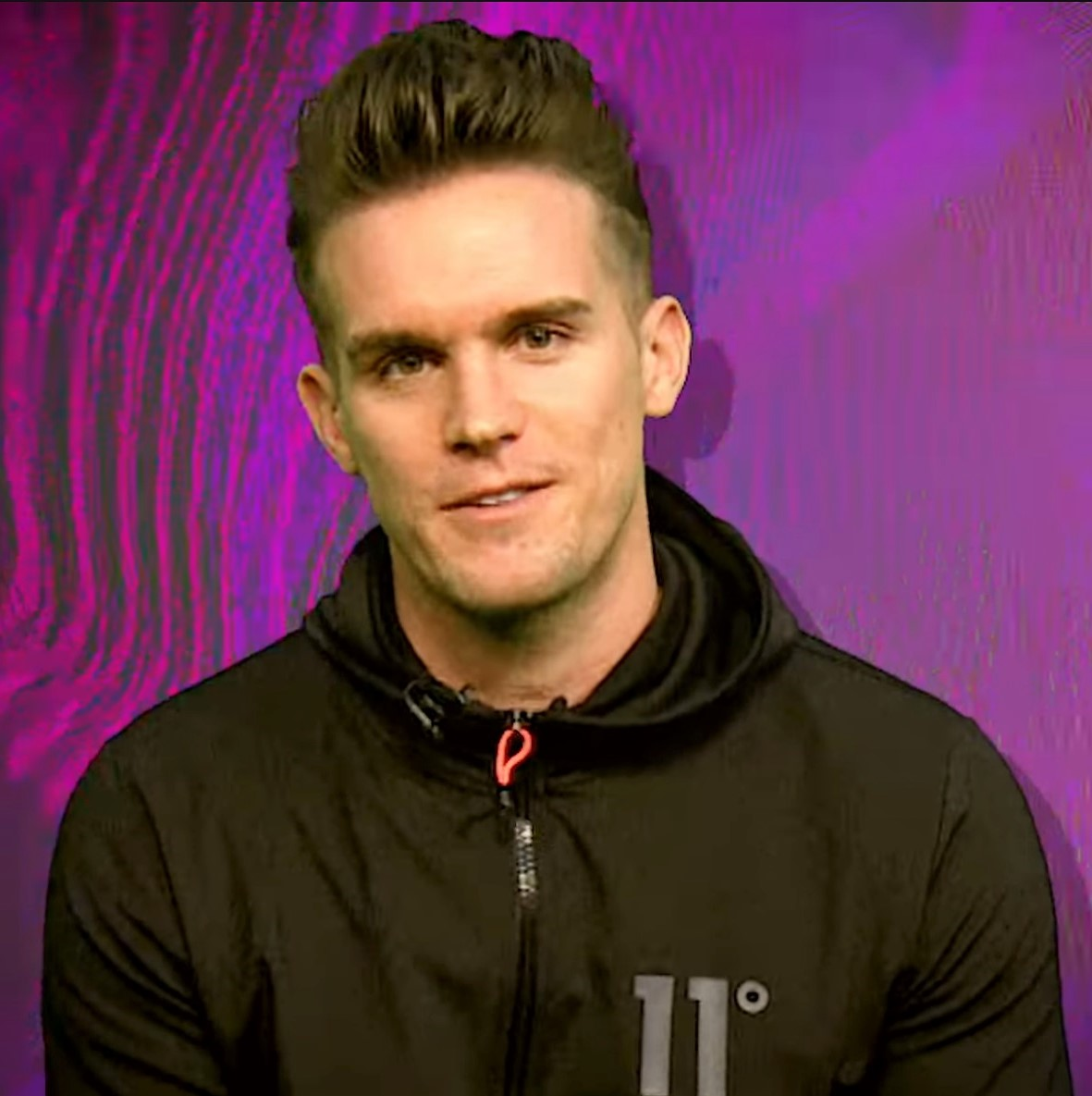
- Beadle in 2017
- Born: Gary Beadle; 22 March 1988 (age 38); Hexham, England
- Occupation: Television personality
- Years active: 2011–present
- Television: Geordie Shore; Ex on the Beach (2015, 2016); Spring Break with Grandad (2017)
- Children: 3

Gary "Gaz" Beadle (born 22 March 1988) is an English reality television personality from Prudhoe, Northumberland, known primarily for appearing in the MTV reality series Geordie Shore from 2011 to 2017. He made his long anticipated return to the series in 2026. In 2015, he appeared in the second series of Ex on the Beach, and later returned to take part in the All Stars fifth series in 2016. In 2019, Beadle began starring in the MTV series Geordie OGs, a spinoff series of Geordie Shore.

== Career ==
Gary Beadle first became known for being an original cast member of Geordie Shore in 2011. From December 2015 to April 2016, Beadle and Charlotte Crosby started a romantic relationship outside of filming Geordie Shore. This came to an end following Crosby's miscarriage of the pair's first child through an ectopic pregnancy. He last appeared in 2017 after announcing that he was to become a father. In 2014, Beadle appeared in the second series of Ex on the Beach with Tommy A Starz as the former flame of Melissa Reeves. He was later joined by fellow Geordie Shore cast member Charlotte Crosby and Emily Coller. In 2016, Beadle returned to Ex on the Beach for a second time during the fifth series, this time as main cast. Lillie Lexie Gregg and Melissa Reeves joined the series as his exes. It was also announced that Beadle would be taking part in the new MTV show Spring Break With Grandad which sees eight twenty somethings head to Cancun with their grandparents for spring break.

Beadle has also made guest appearances in TV programmes such as Drunk History, Safeword, Big Brother's Bit on the Side, Celebrity Wedding Planner, and Britain's Got More Talent. In 2015, Beadle performed with the male stripping troupe Dreamboys doing guest appearances alongside fellow Geordie Shore cast member Scotty T.

In 2017, Beadle appeared as a celebrity contestant on the Australian version of Hell's Kitchen. He revealed that his chosen charity is Australian Wounded Heroes as he was in the Royal Marines at 16 in Britain.

== Filmography ==
Year	Title	Role	Note
2011–2017; 2026–	Geordie Shore	Himself	Main cast (Series 1–15, 26–)
2015; 2016	Ex on the Beach	Himself	Ex of Melissa Reeves (Series 2); Main cast (Series 5)
2017	Spring Break With Grandad	Himself	Main cast
2017	Hell's Kitchen Australia	Himself	Contestant
2019–2020	Geordie Shore OGs	Himself	Main cast (series 1–2)
2020	Geordie Shore: Their History	Himself	Main cast

=== Guest appearances ===
- Big Brother's Bit on the Side (10 July 2012)
- Celebrity Wedding Planner (18 October 2013)
- Drunk History (23 February 2016)
- Britain's Got More Talent (28 May 2016)
- Safeword (9 June 2016)
- This Morning (1 September 2016)
