= Ex on the Beach (British TV series) series 4 =

Ex on the Beach
- Season 4
- No. of episodes: 8

Release
- Original network: MTV
- Original release: 19 January – 8 March 2016

Season chronology
- ← Previous; Series 3 Next → Series 5

The fourth series of Ex on the Beach, a British television programme, began airing on 19 January 2016 on MTV. The series concluded on 8 March 2016 after eight episodes. The group of cast members for this series include Geordie Shore star Scotty T, and Judge Geordie guest Lewis Good. Star of Magaluf Weekender Jordan Davies also made his return to the series having appeared during the third series, as well as Megan McKenna from the previous series. The series was filmed in Portugal.

Whilst this series was airing, both Scotty T and Megan were both appearing in the seventeenth series or Celebrity Big Brother. Scotty T later went on to win the series. Olivia Walsh later returned to the fifth "all-star" series, along with Jordan who returned to make his third appearance on the show. In 2017, Kieran Lee took part in the eighteenth series of Big Brother, but was evicted during the final week. Jordan Davies also took part in the twentieth series of Celebrity Big Brother in August 2017.

== Cast ==
The official list of cast members were released on 15 December 2015. They include four boys; Joe Delaney, Lewis Good, Scotty T and Youssef Hassane, and four girls; Helen Briggs, Nancy-May Turner, Naomi Hedman and Olivia Walsh. With the announcement of the line-up it was also confirmed that Megan McKenna and Jordan Davies would be making their return to the series as exes. Both previously appeared during Series 3 of the show, whilst Jordan was known for appearing on Magaluf Weekender. Scotty T, star of Geordie Shore was named amongst the cast members, as well as Lewis Good, who is known for appearing on Judge Geordie.

All original cast members arrived at the beach during the first episode and were immediately told to prepare for the arrival of their exes. Olivia's ex-boyfriend James Moore made his debut appearance during the first episode to stir up trouble in the villa, then Kieran Lee, the ex-boyfriend of Helen Briggs arrived looking for love. During the second episode, the group were shocked to discover that the exes could arrive anywhere, not just at the beach, as Gina Barrett arrived wanting to rekindle her romance with her ex-boyfriend Joe. Ashleigh Defty also turned up on the beach as an ex of Scotty T's. The third episode saw the debut of Youssef's one night stand Lacey Fuller, and the Tablet of Terror delivered another shock when Nancy-May was forced to ask one of her housemates to leave the villa. She chose Youssef. Jordan Davies arrived during the fourth episode as an ex one night stand of Lacey, however he was joined by his girlfriend Megan McKenna. Following a violent confrontation with Jordan, Lewis was removed from the villa and did not return. During the fifth episode, Helen's second ex Chet Johnson arrived on the beach, and both instantly rekindled their relationship. James Moore's ex, Kristina Metcalf debuted in the sixth episode arriving during his date with Ashleigh looking to stir things up. The seventh episode featured Gina's next ex, Alex Kippen who arrived to instantly cause trouble. The Tablet of Terror then sprung a surprise on Gina, ordering her to send one of her exes home; Alex or Joe. She chose Joe. Kristina also decided to leave the villa during this episode after feeling isolated. The final ex of the series, Brandon Myers arrived during the eighth episode as Lacey's ex-boyfriend.

- **Bold** indicates original cast member; all other cast were brought into the series as an ex.

Episodes	Name	Age (at start of series)	Hometown	Exes
8	**Helen Briggs**	20	Manchester	Chet Johnson, Kieran Lee
7	**Joe Delaney**	22	Runcorn	Gina Barrett
4	**Lewis Good**	25	London	—N/a
8	**Nancy-May Turner**	21	Kent	—N/a
8	**Naomi Hedman**	22	London	—N/a
8	**Olivia Walsh**	24	Manchester	James Moore
8	**Scotty T**	27	Newcastle	Ashleigh Defty
3	**Youssef Hassane**	20	Kent	Lacey Fuller
8	James Moore	24	Blackpool	Kristina Metcalf, Olivia Walsh
8	Kieran Lee	23	Burnley	Helen Briggs
7	Gina Barrett	22	Liverpool	Alex Kippen, Joe Delaney
7	Ashleigh Defty	20	Newcastle	Scotty T
6	Lacey Fuller	19	Kent	Brandon Myers, Jordan Davies, Youssef Hassane
5	Jordan Davies	23	Cardiff	Lacey Fuller, Megan McKenna
5	Megan McKenna	23	Essex	Jordan Davies
4	Chet Johnson	25	London	Helen Briggs
2	Kristina Metcalf	22	Liverpool	James Moore
2	Alex Kippen	22	Liverpool	Gina Barrett
1	Brandon Myers	19	Kent	Lacey Fuller

=== Duration of cast ===
Cast members	Episodes							
Cast members	1	2	3	4	5	6	7	8
Helen								
Joe								
Lewis								
Nancy-May								
Naomi								
Olivia								
Scotty T								
Youssef								
James								
Kieran								
Gina								
Ashleigh								
Lacey								
Jordan								
Megan								
Chet								
Kristina								
Alex								
Brandon								

Table Key
Key: = "Cast member" is featured in this episode
Key: = "Cast member" arrives on the beach
Key: = "Cast member" has an ex arrive on the beach
Key: = "Cast member" arrives on the beach and has an ex arrive during the same episode
Key: = "Cast member" leaves the beach
Key: = "Cast member" has an ex arrive on the beach and leaves during the same episode
Key: = "Cast member" does not feature in this episode

== Episodes ==
No. overall	No. in season	Title	Original release date	Duration	UK viewers
27	1	"Episode 1"	19 January 2016	60 minutes	822,000
Eight new singles arrive at the beach looking for love but are all fully aware that their ex could be ready to strike at any moment. Olivia takes an instant liking to Scotty T, and after a successful date the pair end up getting physical in the bedroom. The arrival of Olivia's ex James turns the vibe in the villa upside down as Lewis immediately clashes with him over his treatment of women. Elsewhere Youssef tries his luck with Nancy-May, Naomi and Joe go on a date, and Lewis smashes the villa up during a heated row with James. Just as the atmosphere begins to settle, Kieran turns up on the beach as Helen's ex.
28	2	"Episode 2"	26 January 2016	60 minutes	805,000
Scotty T turns his attention towards Nancy-May, and Helen is far from impressed at Kieran's attempt at an apology. As the group all head to a beach party they are unaware that another ex is waiting for them back at the villa. Naomi tries to mark her territory on Joe as she clashes with his ex-fling Gina which leads to an explosive confrontation, whilst James and Olivia call time on their relationship forever. Ashleigh's presence on the beach brings back memories for Scotty T, but there's chemistry between her and James. With Olivia's heart getting broken again, Helen and Lewis have no choice but to stand up to James.
29	3	"Episode 3"	2 February 2016	60 minutes	725,000
James continues to make enemies in the house as the anger towards him builds, this time from Ashleigh following a small disagreement. Scotty T and Nancy-May grow closer until Lacey arrives as Youssef's ex and catches his eyes causing Nancy-May to see red. James is left devastated after catching Ashleigh kiss Lewis during a game of spin the bottle then take Joe up to the penthouse. Elsewhere Nancy-May and Lacey compete for Scotty T's attention but it's Lacey who seals the deal, and Ashleigh and James rekindle their romance. The Tablet of Terror forces Nancy-May to make an impossible decision as she sends Youssef packing.
30	4	"Episode 4"	9 February 2016	60 minutes	819,000
Olivia is delighted when James agrees not to get with Ashleigh in front of her again but is quickly left humiliated when he goes back on his word. The love triangle between Scotty T, Lacey and Nancy-May continues but this time it's Nancy-May who ends up in bed with him. Lacey's ex-one night stand Jordan arrives at the villa with his girlfriend Megan in tow and the girls instantly go to war. Lewis tries his luck with Megan on their date who furiously reports back to Jordan. Elsewhere Scotty T makes amends with Lacey, and Lewis is forced to leave the villa following a violent confrontation between him and Jordan.
31	5	"Episode 5"	16 February 2016	60 minutes	979,000
Lacey and Nancy-May both give Scotty T separate ultimatums leaving him torn over which one of them to choose. Gina sets her sights on Kieran as the pair are forced to spend the night in the villa alone together whilst the others go clubbing. The girls unite against James as he continues to cause trouble, whilst Kieran finally gives into temptation. Helen is over the moon when her ex-boyfriend Chet arrives and rekindle their relationship. Jordan gives Scotty T some much needed advice, and Kieran realises he's made a big mistake when Gina becomes obsessed with him launching an attack on Olivia for just flirting with him.
32	6	"Episode 6"	23 February 2016	60 minutes	1,102,000
Gina and Olivia's feud escalates when Kieran makes his choice, whilst Jordan urges Scotty T and Nancy-May to work out their differences. James and Ashleigh's big date is ruined by the arrival of his ex-fling Kristina who he denies sleeping with. The group are divided as they're torn over whom to believe, James or Kristina, and Scotty T bed hops again as he tries to satisfy both Nancy-May and Lacey. The tension between Megan and Naomi reaches boiling point and leads to an explosive argument between the pair, and Megan vows to pack her bags and return home.
33	7	"Episode 7"	1 March 2016	60 minutes	995,000
Olivia decides to play with fire when she turns her attention back to Scotty T, meanwhile Gina welcomes her ex-boyfriend Alex with open arms. The Tablet of Terror forces Gina to send one of her exes home, so she chooses Joe – but instantly regrets it when Alex goes back on his word and stabs her in the back. After feeling isolated by her housemates, Kristina departs the villa, whilst Lacey and Nancy-May are forced to confront Scotty T over his treatment of them. Scotty T finally opens up to Nancy-May that he wants to be with her but is shocked when she rejects him.
34	8	"Episode 8"	8 March 2016	60 minutes	918,000
Ashleigh and Scotty T take a trip down memory lane where they realise that their feelings may not have gone away. Lacey's last trip to the beach ends in disaster when her ex-boyfriend Brandon arrives to stir up trouble. Jordan proposes to Megan on her birthday and she says yes, meanwhile Brandon tries to get back in Lacey's good books, and Chet and Helen make things official. Nancy makes an accusation as she believes Ashleigh and Scotty T still love each other, Olivia and James have a final fallout, and Jordan and Megan get engaged.

== Ratings ==
Episode	Date	Official MTV rating	MTV weekly rank	Official MTV+1 rating	Total MTV viewers
Episode 1	19 January 2016	804,000	1	18,000	822,000
Episode 2	26 January 2016	765,000	1	40,000	805,000
Episode 3	2 February 2016	680,000	1	45,000	725,000
Episode 4	9 February 2016	791,000	1	28,000	819,000
Episode 5	16 February 2016	949,000	1	30,000	979,000
Episode 6	23 February 2016	1,069,000	1	33,000	1,102,000
Episode 7	1 March 2016	982,000	1	13,000	995,000
Episode 8	8 March 2016	912,000	1	6,000	918,000
Average viewers		869,000	1	27,000	896,000
