= Chloe Goodman =

British model and television personality

- Born: 10 June 1993 (age 33)
- Occupations: Reality TV star, model
- Years active: 2014-
- Television: Ex on the Beach, Celebrity Big Brother
- Spouse: Grant Hall (m. 2024)
- Children: Isla Elizabeth Hall; Hudson Christopher Sean-Terry Hall
- Relatives: Lauryn Goodman (sister)

Chloe Goodman is a British reality television star and retired glamour model. She is best known for her appearances on MTV UK's reality series Ex on the Beach.

== Modelling career ==
Goodman began her career as a Page 3 model. She posed in numerous magazines including; Nuts, People and Zoo, among others. Goodman also worked as a body double for British pop singer, Cheryl Cole for her L'Oreal advertisements.

In 2015, in a Channel 4 News debate about The Sun's usage of topless models in their tabloid, she argued against Germaine Greer and Harriet Harman, stating; "Why should feminist women, then tell other women, how to live their lives? Women fought together to get to vote and so on and so forth - so why should women now be fighting each other and tell each other what job roles to now take within the industry?".

After her appearance in the fifteenth series of Celebrity Big Brother, she became the face of Lovehoney's lingerie line.

== Television career ==
In 2014, Goodman appeared as an original cast member on the first series of MTV UK's Ex on the Beach, featuring in all eight episodes. During her time on the show she feuded with Geordie Shore star, Vicky Pattison.

In 2015, she entered the fifteenth series of Celebrity Big Brother, on Day 1, was the first housemate to be evicted on Day 10, placing thirteenth overall. Goodman was involved in a controversial incident leading to the removal of American actor, Jeremy Jackson, after Jackson sexually assaulted Goodman by pulling her nightgown open, exposing her breast.

In 2016, Goodman returned to Ex on the Beach as an all star for its fifth series. She was the first cast member to be sent home from the show in episode 2, after a verbal confrontation with Stephen Bear and slapping Jordan Davies.

She has also made multiple other television appearances, including; Good Morning Britain, Lorraine, NHS in Crisis: The Live Debate, The Real Housewives of Cheshire, The Story of Reality TV and This Morning.

== Personal life ==
In June 2024, Goodman married footballer Grant Hall; they have two children together.

Her sister is media personality, Lauryn Goodman.

== Filmography ==
Television
Year	Title	Role	Notes
2014	Plastic	Zara	
2014	Ex on the Beach series 1	Self; cast member	8 episodes
2015	Channel 4 News	Self; page 3 model	1 episode
2015	Celebrity Big Brother series 15	Self; housemate	13th place, 12 episodes
2015	Celebrity Big Brother's Bit on the Side	Self; ex-housemate	6 episodes
2015	This Morning	Self; guest	1 episode
2015	Lorraine	Self; guest	1 episode
2015	NHS in Crisis: The Live Debate	Self; speaker	TV special
2015	Celebrity Big Brother: Heroes and Villains	Self; ex-housemate	TV special
2016	Ex on the Beach series 5	Self; cast member	2 episodes
2016	The Real Housewives of Cheshire	Self; guest	1 episode
2017	When Reality TV Goes Horribly Wrong	Self; feature	TV special
2018	The Story of Reality TV	Self; feature	Documentary, 1 episode
2019	Good Morning Britain	Self; guest	1 episode
2020	When Celebrity Goes Horribly Wrong 2	Self; commentator	TV special
