= Ex on the Beach (British TV series) series 6 =

Ex on the Beach
- Season 6
- No. of episodes: 10

Release
- Original network: MTV
- Original release: 17 January – 21 March 2017

Season chronology
- ← Previous; Series 5 Next → Series 7

The sixth series of Ex on the Beach, a British television programme, began on 17 January 2017 on MTV. The series was confirmed on 2 November 2016. The group of cast members for this series included Geordie Shore star Aaron Chalmers, former The Only Way Is Essex star Nicole Bass and Love Island series 1 contestant Josh Ritchie. It also featured the return of Ross Worswick following his appearance in the first series of the show.

Shortly after the series it was announced that Zahida Allen had joined the cast of Geordie Shore for the fourteenth series. Josh later returned for the seventh series, this time as an ex. Chanelle McCleary also went on to compete in the eighteenth series of Big Brother, but was evicted a week before the final.

== Cast ==
The official list of cast members were released on 13 December 2016. They included four boys; Alex Leslie, Josh Ritchie, Ross Worswick and Sean Pratt, and four girls: Harriette Harper, Maisie Gillespie, Zahida Allen and ZaraLena Jackson. Ross has previously appeared in the first series of the show whereas Josh featured in the first series of Love Island. With the announcement of the line-up it was also confirmed that Geordie Shore star Aaron Chalmers would be arriving on the beach as an ex as well as former The Only Way Is Essex cast member Nicole Bass.

All original cast members arrived at the beach during the first episode and were immediately told to prepare for the arrival of their exes. The first episode also included Zahida's ex-boyfriend Joe McLean arrive on the beach hell-bent on revenge against her, and The Only Way Is Essex star Nicole Bass show up as Josh's ex-fling. Jack Devlin made his debut during the second episode determined to rekindle the relationship with his ex-girlfriend Harriette. He is also Nicole's ex. This episode also featured the shock arrival of Alex's ex-girlfriend who showed up at the villa with no warning. The third episode featured the arrival of Geordie Shore cast member Aaron Chalmers, who arrived at the villa in a helicopter to surprise his ex-one night stand Maisie. The Tablet of Terror also gave Josh the power to send one of his housemates home during this episode, and he chose Alex. Another ex of Nicole's is unearthed during the fourth episode as Adam Oukhellou turns up with the clear intention to cause trouble. During the fifth episode Aaron's ex-girlfriend Becca Edwards arrived with unfinished business, whilst Alice made an unexplained departure from the villa. Jacques Fraser arrives during the sixth episode to patch things with his ex-girlfriend Nicole following rumours that he cheated on her, but he's left sick to his stomach during the seventh episode when the girl he cheated on her with Frankie Isabella arrives on the beach to reveal the whole truth. Zaralena also left the villa during this episode following one too many arguments. Trouble arises when Chanelle McLeary arrives as Josh's ex during the eighth episode, and she's quickly removed from the villa after a violent stand-off with Zahida. Jacques also leaves the villa during this episode when the Tablet of Terror forces Sean into sending somebody home. The penultimate episode featured the arrival of Jenny Thompson, the ex-girlfriend of Josh who turned up to see if he had matured. Maisie's ex-boyfriend Sam Stoddart who arrived on the island. The final episode included the arrival of Taylor Morgan declaring war on her ex-boyfriend Sean.

- **Bold** indicates original cast member; all other cast were brought into the series as an ex.

Episodes	Name	Age (at start of series)	Hometown	Exes
3	**Alex Leslie**	25	London	Alice Downer
10	**Harriette Harper**	25	Essex	Jack Devlin
10	**Josh Ritchie**	22	Bolton	Chanelle McCleary, Jenny Thompson, Nicole Bass
10	**Maisie Gillespie**	20	Cardiff	Aaron Chalmers, Sam Stoddart
10	**Ross Worswick**	27	Manchester	—N/a
10	**Sean Pratt**	26	Coventry	Taylor Morgan
10	**Zahida Allen**	22	Newcastle	Joe McLean
7	**ZaraLena Jackson**	24	Preston	—N/a
2	Joe McLean	23	Newcastle	Zahida Allen
10	Nicole Bass	25	Essex	Adam Oukhellou, Jack Devlin, Jacques Fraser, Josh Ritchie
9	Jack Devlin	24	Essex	Frankie Isabella, Harriette Harper, Nicole Bass
4	Alice Downer	22	London	Alex Leslie
8	Aaron Chalmers	29	Newcastle	Becca Edwards, Maisie Gillespie
7	Adam Oukhellou	27	London	Frankie Isabella, Nicole Bass
6	Becca Edwards	24	Newcastle	Aaron Chalmers
3	Jacques Fraser	26	Essex	Frankie Isabella, Nicole Bass
4	Frankie Isabella	24	Walthamstow	Adam Oukhellou, Jack Devlin, Jacques Fraser
1	Chanelle McCleary	25	Manchester	Josh Ritchie
2	Jenny Thompson	26	Bolton	Josh Ritchie
2	Sam Stoddart	21	Yorkshire	Maisie Gillespie
1	Taylor Morgan	21	Nuneaton	Sean Pratt

=== Duration of cast ===
Cast members	Episodes									
Cast members	1	2	3	4	5	6	7	8	9	10
Alex										
Harriette										
Josh										
Maisie										
Ross										
Sean										
Zahida										
ZaraLena										
Joe										
Nicole										
Jack										
Alice										
Aaron										
Adam										
Becca										
Jacques										
Frankie										
Chanelle										
Jenny										
Sam										
Taylor										

Table Key
Key: = "Cast member" is featured in this episode
Key: = "Cast member" arrives on the beach
Key: = "Cast member" has an ex arrive on the beach
Key: = "Cast member" arrives on the beach and has an ex arrive during the same episode
Key: = "Cast member" leaves the beach
Key: = "Cast member" has an ex arrive on the beach and leaves during the same episode
Key: = "Cast member" arrives on the beach and leaves during the same episode
Key: = "Cast member" does not feature in this episode

== Episodes ==
No. overall	No. in season	Title	Original release date	Duration	UK viewers
45	1	"Episode 1"	17 January 2017	60 minutes	730,000
A new batch of singles arrive on the beach and are instantly rocked by the news that their exes are on their way. Sean finds himself caught in the middle of Maisie and Zahida who both fight for his attention, but it's Zahida who gets him in the penthouse. Things are turned upside down when Zahida's ex-boyfriend Joe turns up on the beach and flips at the news of her night of passion with Sean. Desperate for revenge, Maisie and Joe head to the penthouse where Zahida attempts to sabotage their night together. Elsewhere Ross and Harriette grow close, Zaralena causes tension, and Nicole arrives on the beach as Josh's ex.
46	2	"Episode 2"	24 January 2017	60 minutes	758,000
Harriette panics when she fears that Ross's attention may sway towards Nicole. An out of control Joe loses his temper once again with Zahida causing him to smash up the villa, but following the destruction he finally confesses his true feelings towards her before packing his bags to get away. Harriette is sent into a spin when her ex-boyfriend Jack arrives at the beach determined to win her back, and she ditches Ross in order to rekindle their rocky relationship. Zahida and Sean continue to grow closer, and Alex is overcome with emotions when his ex-girlfriend Alice makes a shock arrival at the villa, and he pleads for her to take him back.
47	3	"Episode 3"	31 January 2017	60 minutes	765,000
Harriette begins to feel guilty for dropping Ross for Jack so decides to U-turn and give him another chance. Zahida becomes obsessive over Sean unaware that it's actually Zaralena that he likes. Alex and Alice fail to patch things up before the Tablet of Terror throws another devilish twist leading to Alex's departure. Zahida turns psycho with Maisie for kissing Sean during a game of spin the bottle, and rages again after Sean's feelings for Zaralena are revealed. The villa is rocked once more with the arrival of Maisie's ex-one night stand Aaron who is instantly attracted to Zaralena. Elsewhere Jack ups his game as he tries to wipe out the competition.
48	4	"Episode 4"	7 February 2017	60 minutes	804,000
Nicole panics when another one of her exes is unearthed and it's clear his intentions are to cause trouble for her. Zahida's jealousy towards Zaralena increases when she fears that she's about to steal Sean away from her, and Nicole is distraught to hear a shock truth about an ex. Jack and Adam drip poison in Josh's ear when they realise he's getting closer to Nicole again, and Aaron confronts Zahida for isolating Zaralena. Elsewhere Maisie offers herself on a plate to Aaron, and Jack and Harriette clash once more.
49	5	"Episode 5"	14 February 2017	60 minutes	820,000
The villa is rocked when the next ex arrives with unfinished business as Zaralena fears Aaron will push her aside for Becca. Aaron breaks down when him and Becca attempt to chat about their relationship. Elsewhere Nicole rejects both Adam and Josh, and Ross reaches breaking point when Harriette continues to obsess over Jack's actions. Aaron rages when he discovers Becca has kissed Jack before they've had a chance to settle their differences, and Nicole worries they're only arguing because they're still in love with each other.
50	6	"Episode 6"	21 February 2017	60 minutes	798,000
Zaralena decides to back off from Aaron when she realises that it's clear he and Becca has unfinished business. Nicole is sick to the stomach when her ex-boyfriend Jacques arrives at the beach and she's quick to confront him over the cheating rumours Adam has started. Jacques firmly denies the rumours before rekindling the romance with Nicole, only to be rocked when he discovers she's kissed Jack during a game of spin the bottle. After Becca has a heart-to-heart with Aaron about her feelings, she chooses Jack to go with the penthouse with her.
51	7	"Episode 7"	28 February 2017	60 minutes	799,000
Fed up of the drama, Zaralena decides to leave the villa. Jack is caught in the middle as Aaron and Becca are at each other's throats again. Jacques is in a state of shock when Frankie arrives at the beach determined to tell Nicole the truth about her cheating ex. Nicole is knocked for six when Jacques makes a big confession to her about Ibiza, and Frankie walks into a warzone as Nicole launches an attack on her. Jacques is public enemy number one when the girls wreak revenge on him for disrespecting Nicole, whilst Ross and Harriette put an end to their brief fling.
52	8	"Episode 8"	7 March 2017	60 minutes	916,000
The feud between Nicole and Frankie continues. Jacques has no choice but to pack his bags when the Tablet of Terror gives Sean the power to send somebody home. Chanelle arrives in the villa as the ex-girlfriend of Josh and she's desperate for revenge. Elsewhere Ross and Harriette rekindle their romance, and Chanelle sets her sights on Sean. Nicole is left in doubt whether to trust Adam or not, and Chanelle has a violent confrontation with Zahida before she announces that she's had enough. Becca is torn between Aaron and Ross, and the group are happy to see Chanelle go.
53	9	"Episode 9"	14 March 2017	60 minutes	890,000
The rift between Aaron and Becca widens. After seeing her fighting the night before, Sean's attempts at distancing himself from Zahida don't go to plan when he ends up in bed with her again. Josh is disappointed when his ex-girlfriend Jenny arrives and is more interested in Aaron, and Becca is livid to find out the pair have had a successful first date. Ross ends things with Harriette following another drama with Jack, and Becca and Aaron have another public heated discussion. Maisie's ex-boyfriend Sam arrives and Zahida is quick to throw her under the bus by revealing all her secrets from the villa.
54	10	"Episode 10"	21 March 2017	60 minutes	765,000
With Zahida and Sean closer than ever before, it's not long before the final ex throws a spanner in the works. Aaron and Becca finally give each other the closure they need during a trip down memory lane, and Nicole confesses her love for Adam. Zahida is left red faced when she discovers that Sean wants to get back with Taylor, but he's completely unaware that he's just a pawn in Taylor's game as she plots revenge. A huge confrontation on the final night sees Taylor expose Sean's true colours as the whole villa turn against him, and the Tablet of Terror drops a bombshell on Harriette and Ross.

== Ratings ==
Episode	Date	Official MTV rating	MTV weekly rank	Official MTV+1 rating	Total MTV viewers
Episode 1	17 January 2017	725,000	1	5,000	730,000
Episode 2	24 January 2017	751,000	1	7,000	758,000
Episode 3	31 January 2017	753,000	1	12,000	765,000
Episode 4	7 February 2017	794,000	1	10,000	804,000
Episode 5	14 February 2017	777,000	1	43,000	820,000
Episode 6	21 February 2017	776,000	1	22,000	798,000
Episode 7	28 February 2017	794,000	1	5,000	799,000
Episode 8	7 March 2017	911,000	1	5,000	916,000
Episode 9	14 March 2017	849,000	1	41,000	890,000
Episode 10	21 March 2017	739,000	1	26,000	765,000
Average viewers		787,000	1	18,000	805,000
