= Ex on the Beach (British TV series) series 3 =

Ex on the Beach
- Season 3
- No. of episodes: 10

Release
- Original network: MTV
- Original release: 11 August – 13 October 2015

Series chronology
- ← Previous; Series 2 Next → Series 4

The third series of Ex on the Beach, a British television programme, began airing on 11 August 2015 on MTV. The series concluded on 13 October 2015 after 10 episodes. The group of cast members for this series included former The Only Way Is Essex star Kirk Norcross, whilst exes featured star of Geordie Shore and series 1 returnee Vicky Pattison as well as Rogan O'Connor who was an original cast member from the second series. Jordan Davies also joined the series as an ex having already appeared in Magaluf Weekender as well as Cami-Li, who appeared in fifteenth series of Celebrity Big Brother earlier in the year. This was the first series where the "Tablet of Terror" gave the cast members the decision to evict one another in evil twists. As well as this, it was the first series to include a same-sex ex. The series was filmed in Cancún, Mexico.

Jordan Davies and Megan McKenna later returned during the fourth series entering as a couple. Jordan made a third appearance during the fifth "All-Star" series, this time as main cast along with Bear and Jemma, and Holly returning as an ex again. Shortly after this series, in 2016 it was announced that Marty McKenna had joined the cast of Geordie Shore for the twelfth series. Megan McKenna also went on to appear in the seventeenth series of Celebrity Big Brother before later joining the cast of The Only Way Is Essex, where as Stephen Bear also entered the house during the eighteenth series and went on to win. A year later in August 2017, both Jemma Lucy and Jordan Davies took part in the twentieth series.

== Cast ==
The official list of cast members were released on 14 July 2015. They include four boys; Graham Griffiths, Jayden Robins, Kirk Norcross, Stephen Bear, and four girls; Amy Cooke, Laura Summers and Megan McKenna, Megan Rees. With the announcement of the line-up it was confirmed that former Geordie Shore cast member, and star of the first series Vicky Pattison would be making her return as an ex, alongside Series 2 star Rogan O'Connor. The Only Way Is Essex cast member Kirk Norcross was also confirmed to be taking part in the series, with his ex-fiancée and Celebrity Big Brother star Cami-Li featuring as his ex. The Magaluf Weekender star Jordan Davies was also revealed to be taking part in the series, also featuring as an ex.

All original cast members arrived on the beach during the first episode where they were instantly told that they would soon be joined by their exes. Laura's ex-fling Jemma Lucy arrived at the villa during the first episode. This is the first time a same-sex ex has featured in the show. Also arriving in the first episode was Jordan Davies, an ex-boyfriend of Amy wanting to cause some trouble. Marty McKenna arrived during the next episode as the ex-romance of Jemma, then his ex-girlfriend Sarah Goodhart showed up during the third episode desperate to win back his affection. After much anticipation Cami-Li arrived at the beach during the fourth episode and instantly erupted at ex-fiancée Kirk. Soon after this, Kirk and Jemma's brief romance in the villa came to an end and they were added to each other's ex-list. The fifth episode featured the Tablet of Terrors new twist, which allowed Jordan to choose to send somebody home between Jayden and Megan M. He chose Jayden. As well as this, Jordan's ex-girlfriend Ali Drew made her first appearance at the beach, and Griff's ex Holly Rickwood arrived seeking his attention. Star of first series and Geordie Shore, Vicky Pattison arrived during the sixth episode as the ex-girlfriend of Kirk, but due to his ongoing arguments in the house, he voluntarily decided to leave the villa. Megan R's ex-boyfriend Stephen Cochrane made his debut during the seventh episode unsure of his intentions, and Marty was forced to leave the villa due to illness. The villa was left in shock during the eighth episode when the Tablet of Terror ordered Ali to send one of the exes home; she chose Vicky. Following this, Cami-Li decided to leave the beach having completed her mission to make Kirk's life a misery. Star of the second series, Rogan O'Connor also turned up on the beach as Jemma's ex. The ninth episode featured the arrival of Bear's ex-girlfriend and Megan M's ex-best friend Connie Wiltshire who intended to stir things up in the villa.

- **Bold** indicates original cast member; all other cast were brought into the series as an ex.

Episodes	Name	Age (at start of series)	Hometown	Exes
10	**Amy Cooke**	21	Cardiff	Jordan Davies
10	**Graham Griffiths**	26	Wiltshire	Holly Rickwood
5	**Jayden Robins**	30	London	—N/a
6	**Kirk Norcross**	26	Essex	Cami-Li, Jemma Lucy, Vicky Pattison
10	**Laura Summers**	30	Manchester	Jemma Lucy
10	**Megan McKenna**	22	Essex	—N/a
10	**Megan Rees**	20	Carmarthen	Stephen Cochrane
10	**Stephen Bear**	25	East London	Connie Wiltshire
10	Jemma Lucy	27	Manchester	Kirk Norcross, Laura Summers, Marty McKenna, Rogan O'Connor
10	Jordan Davies	22	Cardiff	Ali Drew, Amy Cooke
6	Marty McKenna	20	Newcastle	Jemma Lucy, Sarah Goodhart
8	Sarah Goodhart	21	Newcastle	Marty McKenna
5	Cami-Li	28	Miami	Kirk Norcross
6	Ali Drew	25	Cardiff	Jordan Davies
6	Holly Rickwood	23	Portsmouth	Graham Griffiths
3	Vicky Pattison	26	Newcastle	Kirk Norcross
4	Stephen Cochrane	25	Cornwall	Megan Rees
3	Rogan O'Connor	25	Stratford-upon-Avon	Jemma Lucy
2	Connie Wiltshire	20	Essex	Stephen Bear

=== Duration of cast ===
Cast members	Episodes									
Cast members	1	2	3	4	5	6	7	8	9	10
Amy										
Bear										
Griff										
Jayden										
Kirk										
Laura										
Megan M										
Megan R										
Jemma										
Jordan										
Marty										
Sarah										
Cami-Li										
Ali										
Holly										
Vicky										
Stephen										
Rogan										
Connie										

Table Key
Key: = "Cast member" is featured in this episode
Key: = "Cast member" arrives on the beach
Key: = "Cast member" has an ex arrive on the beach
Key: = "Cast member" arrives on the beach and has an ex arrive during the same episode
Key: = "Cast member" leaves the beach
Key: = "Cast member" has an ex arrive on the beach and leaves during the same episode
Key: = "Cast member" does not feature in this episode

== Episodes ==
No. overall	No. in season	Title	Original release date	Duration	UK viewers
17	1	"Episode 1"	11 August 2015	60 minutes	751,000
A brand new batch of singles arrive looking for love but are immediately regretting it after finding out their exes will be joining them. Bear and Megan M hit it off on their first date, but as he gets back to the villa it's Amy who he's smooching. Amy erupts when she hears that Bear has denied kissing her – but then ends up in his bed much to the annoyance of Megan M. As her attention draws to Kirk, Megan M is left instantly jealous when he takes a liking to Laura's ex-flame Jemma instead. Following the first night drama, Amy feels isolated from the group, but things get a whole lot worse when her ex-boyfriend Jordan arrives at the beach.
18	2	"Episode 2"	18 August 2015	60 minutes	861,000
Things get increasingly worse for Amy when she's forced to listen to Megan R describe her date with Jordan, whilst Bear feels the wrath of Megan M when things get personal during a game of “Would you rather?”, causing Bear and Amy to find solace in each other's arms. After making up the next day with Bear, Megan M rages with Amy when she discovers they've spent the night together and sets her sights on Jordan in an attempt to get back at her. Elsewhere Jemma and Kirk's perfect date is interrupted by the arrival of her ex Marty, and Jayden and Griff clash.
19	3	"Episode 3"	25 August 2015	60 minutes	719,000
The competition between Bear and Jordan intensifies as Megan M can't decide who she likes more. After getting with Amy, Marty reports back to Jordan with harsh words about her, but they soon spread round the villa causing an almighty confrontation. Marty's distraught following the arrival of his ex-girlfriend Sarah, who knows how to push his buttons when she goes on a date with Bear. Megan M finally makes up her mind and chooses to be with Jordan, whilst Bear returns to the villa to a warzone when the group discover that he's been telling lies about them.
20	4	"Episode 4"	1 September 2015	60 minutes	831,000
Bear wakes up to plenty of tension following the recent drama, but there's more awkwardness as Marty goes on a date with all of his exes. Cami-Li arrives on the beach and immediately explodes with ex-fiancée Kirk. The villa erupts when Cami-Li gets personal with both Jemma and Laura, whilst Marty and Sarah end up having sex again. Kirk and Cami-Li finally settle their differences for the first time since their break-up, and he agrees not to get with Jemma again out of respect – but when he lies to Jemma about his promise, there are more kick-offs back at the villa.
21	5	"Episode 5"	8 September 2015	60 minutes	821,000
Kirk isn't happy with Jemma and Cami-Li's new alliance. There's trouble in paradise when Jordan's ex-girlfriend arrives to stir things up between him and Megan M, and he plays right into her hands following a date together. Megan M releases her inner psycho once more with Ali on the receiving end, meanwhile Marty delivers some harsh home truths to Sarah after she suspects he's getting close to Amy again. Elsewhere Jordan chooses to stay with Megan M, and Kirk and Griff end up in an almighty clash over Ali. Bear tries his luck with Griff's ex Holly, and Kirk contemplates leaving.
22	6	"Episode 6"	15 September 2015	60 minutes	769,000
Kirk and Ali get increasingly closer until Vicky's arrival sparks trouble. Jemma and Cami-Li both predict that Kirk will return to his old habits and drop Ali for Vicky after spotting a connection. Megan M erupts once more with Ali accusing her of still having feelings for Jordan, whilst Bear leaves Holly devastated by ending their quick fling so he can concentrate on Vicky. After a hen night themed party, an emotional Kirk makes a move on Vicky but is left reeling after seeing her kissing Bear afterwards. Deciding he can't cope in the villa anymore, Kirk packs his bags and leaves.
23	7	"Episode 7"	22 September 2015	60 minutes	796,000
Holly struggles to believe Bear's excuses as to why he doesn't want to be with her anymore, whilst Megan M's growing hatred towards Ali continues. A huge kick off in the villa reignites Megan R's drama with Megan M. Laura takes a liking to new boy Stephen despite him being her best friend Megan R's ex, so the pair's instant connection causes a stir within the villa. Vicky decides to get closer with Bear believing he's the one for her, whilst animosity is caused in the villa when Laura betrays her friend and attempts to get with Stephen despite promising not to make a move.
24	8	"Episode 8"	29 September 2015	60 minutes	713,000
Cami-Li decides to leave the villa having accomplished her mission to ruin Kirk's life, and Vicky's temper is put to the test when Bear and Ali go on a date, but after hearing what the pair have been up to she's left with no choice but to erupt. Ali is given the chance to send an ex home and chooses Vicky, whilst Megan R and Laura desperately try and compete for Stephen's attention. Jemma's ex Rogan arrives on the beach and instantly connects with Megan M causing jealousy for Jordan. Back at the villa the tensions reach boiling point when Megan M and Jordan clash, then goes up to the penthouse with Rogan as an act of revenge.
25	9	"Episode 9"	6 October 2015	60 minutes	767,000
Deciding that getting with Megan M is too much drama, Rogan sets his sights on Ali instead. Megan R, Laura and Stephen are sent on an awkward date in the treetops where their issues don't get resolved. Elsewhere Jordan rages after Megan M and Rogan kiss during a game of truth or dare, and he decides to play her at her own game. Stephen picks Laura but is left instantly regretting it, and Bear's ex-girlfriend Connie arrives to reveal she used to be Megan M's best friend before a betrayal, and there are fireworks when the pair eventually come face-to-face.
26	10	"Episode 10"	13 October 2015	60 minutes	743,000
Megan M decides that she wants to win Jordan back but Griff is there to advise him against going back to her. As the group gather for the final banquet, Megan M and Connie finally put their differences aside, whilst a game of honesty explores some underlining issues. Laura is left red faced by Stephen, and Rogan is caught out winking at Megan M. With the tempers increasing, Rogan is put on the spot when Jordan demands an explanation for the wink, Griff stands up to Megan M, and Jordan confesses his feelings.

=== Ratings ===
Episode	Date	Official MTV rating	MTV weekly rank	Official MTV+1 rating	Total MTV viewers
Episode 1	11 August 2015	728,000	1	23,000	751,000
Episode 2	18 August 2015	797,000	1	64,000	861,000
Episode 3	25 August 2015	690,000	1	29,000	719,000
Episode 4	1 September 2015	808,000	1	23,000	831,000
Episode 5	8 September 2015	768,000	1	53,000	821,000
Episode 6	15 September 2015	732,000	1	37,000	769,000
Episode 7	22 September 2015	749,000	1	47,000	796,000
Episode 8	29 September 2015	645,000	1	68,000	713,000
Episode 9	6 October 2015	726,000	1	41,000	767,000
Episode 10	13 October 2015	728,000	1	15,000	743,000
Average viewers		737,000	1	40,000	777,000
