= Jordan Davies =

Welsh television personality

Jordan Davies (born 24 June 1992) is a Welsh television personality and DJ, best known for his role on The Magaluf Weekender, and its successors Ibiza Weekender and Kavos Weekender.

== Early life ==
Davies was born in Cardiff, Wales. he and his younger brother were raised by their mother. He attended St. David's School in Pembrokeshire.

== Career ==
Davies is known for his involvement in The Magaluf Weekender and its successors Ibiza Weekender and Kavos Weekender, as well as Ex on the Beach during the third, fourth and fifth series. In 2017, Davies appeared as a housemate on the twentieth series of Celebrity Big Brother, but became the third housemate to be evicted on Day 15. Davies lives in Abergavenny and works in the chain restaurants Lounge cafe bars.

== Filmography ==
As himself
Year	Title	Notes
2013–2023	Magaluf/Ibiza/Kavos Weekender	10 series
2015, 2017	Ex on the Beach	Series 3 and Series 4 ex, Series 5 main cast
2017	Celebrity Big Brother	CBB20 housemate
