= Kirk Norcross =

English television personality (born 1988

- Born: Kirk John Norcross; 21 April 1988 (age 38); Woodford, London, England
- Occupation: Television personality
- Television: The Only Way Is Essex; Celebrity Big Brother; Ex on the Beach
- Children: 2
- Father: Mick Norcross

Kirk John Norcross (born 21 April 1988) is an English television personality, best known for being a cast member on the ITV2 reality series The Only Way Is Essex from 2010 to 2013. He also participated in the ninth series of Celebrity Big Brother in 2012, and the third series of Ex on the Beach in 2015.

== Career ==
In 2010, he began appearing in the television series The Only Way Is Essex before leaving the show after the third series was aired. Norcross returned to the show in the seventh series, although he departed again in series eight in March 2013. Norcross was also on the front cover of the March 2011 issue of Attitude.

In 2012, Norcross was a housemate on the ninth series of Celebrity Big Brother. He was the fourth housemate to be evicted on Day 16 after receiving the fewest votes to save. In July 2012, Norcross featured in an advertising campaign with friend Jodie Marsh. On 30 September 2012, Norcross returned for the seventh series of The Only Way Is Essex, but just six months later, on 21 March 2013, he announced that he had left the show again. In April 2013, Norcross released his autobiography, Essex Boy.

In 2015, Norcross appeared on the third series of Ex on the Beach. In January 2023, Norcross joined OnlyFans and began uploading content.

== Personal life ==
In May 2013, photographs of Norcross naked and masturbating were leaked onto the internet. Norcross apologised for the images on Twitter. Norcross said in 2015: "I'm probably most famous for masturbating and smoking simultaneously on the internet."

In January 2021, Norcross' father Mick Norcross died by suicide at the age of 57. During a podcast interview with Daniel O'Reilly, he said that discovering his father's body resulted in a drug relapse.

Norcross has two children, a son and a daughter.

In November 2022, Norcross was involved in an incident where Alex Alam, his acquaintance, was attacked by her ex-partner David Richards after Richards saw Norcross kissing Alam. Alam suffered severe injuries, including three skull fractures and requiring 100 stitches. Norcross, who had kissed Ms. Alam on her doorstep minutes earlier, was contacted by Alam via FaceTime, where she told him she was dying from the attack. Norcross immediately returned to find her children crying and helped them. Richards was later arrested and convicted for the attack.

== Filmography ==
As himself
Year	Title	Notes	Ref.
2010–2013	The Only Way Is Essex	Cast member	
2012	Celebrity Big Brother	Housemate; series 9	
2015	Ex on the Beach	Cast member; series 3	
