= Ex on the Beach (British TV series) series 1 =

Ex on the Beach
- Season 1
- No. of episodes: 8

Release
- Original network: MTV
- Original release: 22 April – 10 June 2014

Series chronology
- Next → Series 2

The first series of Ex on the Beach, a British television programme, began airing on 22 April 2014 on MTV. The series concluded on 10 June 2014 after 8 episodes. The show was announced in February 2014. The group of cast members for this series included star of Geordie Shore Vicky Pattison, and she was joined by two of her exes, fellow Geordie Shore cast member Ricci Guarnaccio, and Dan Conn who had briefly appeared during the sixth series of the Newcastle based show.

Ashley Cain later returned to the beach during the second series, this time as an ex, whilst Vicky returned as an ex during the third series. Chloe Goodman went on to appear in Celebrity Big Brother in 2015. During the "All-Star" fifth series, both Chloe and Liam returned to the beach as main cast, whereas Ashley and Joss returned once again as exes. Ross also made a return to the beach for Series 6.

== Cast ==
The official list of cast members was released on 13 March 2014 and includes four single boys: Ashley Cain, Jack Lomax, Liam Lewis and Marco Alexandre; as well as four single girls; Chloe Goodman, Emily Gillard, Farah Sattaur and Geordie Shore cast member Vicky Pattison.

The official cast members all arrived in the first episode of the series, but would be joined by their exes one-by-one over the series. During the first episode Chloe's ex-fling Ross Worswick was introduced, and Marco's ex-girlfriend Frankie Thorpe arrived looking for revenge. Ashley's ex-girlfriend Talitha Minnis arrived during the second episode. During the third episode, despite being brought into the series as an ex, Ross received a shock when his ex-girlfriend Emma Jane Lang arrived on the island. After getting together in the house, Vicky and Ross' brief fling ended and they were officially added to each other's ex-list. Dann Conn, former love interest of Vicky during the sixth series of Geordie Shore, arrived during the fourth episode of the series. Meanwhile, Frankie was removed from the house after taking ill. It was announced she would not be returning. Joss Mooney arrived in the fifth episode, and despite being an ex-boyfriend of Talitha, he's also had a previous fling with Emma Jane and once shared a kiss with Chloe. During the sixth episode, Shelby Billingham made her first appearance. She is the ex-girlfriend of both Joss and Ross. After a lot of anticipation, Geordie Shore star Ricci Guarnaccio arrived on the beach during the seventh episode and immediately caused trouble for his ex-fiancée Vicky. Due to Ashley's aggressive behaviour, he was removed from the house during the final episode of the series. Despite being original cast members, none of Emily, Farah, Jack or Liam's exes arrived on the beach.

- **Bold** indicates original cast member; all other cast were brought into the series as an ex.

Episodes	Name	Age (at start of series)	Hometown	Exes
8	**Ashley Cain**	23	Nuneaton	Talitha Minnis
8	**Chloe Goodman**	20	Brighton	Ross Worswick
8	**Emily Gillard**	18	Cheshire	—N/a
8	**Farah Sattaur**	28	London	—N/a
8	**Jack Lomax**	22	Nottingham	—N/a
8	**Liam Lewis**	25	Hartlepool	—N/a
8	**Marco Alexandre**	22	Sheffield	Frankie Thorpe
8	**Vicky Pattison**	25	Newcastle	Dan Conn, Ricci Guarnaccio, Ross Worswick
8	Ross Worswick	23	Manchester	Chloe Goodman, Emma Jane Lang, Shelby Billingham, Vicky Pattison
4	Frankie Thorpe	18	Kettering	Marco Alexandre
7	Talitha Minnis	21	Norwich	Ashley Cain, Joss Mooney
6	Emma Jane Lang	23	Manchester	Joss Mooney, Ross Worswick
5	Dan Conn	27	Sydney, Australia	Vicky Pattison
4	Joss Mooney	24	Manchester/Norwich	Emma Jane Lang, Shelby Billingham, Talitha Minnis
3	Shelby Billingham	19	Birmingham	Joss Mooney, Ross Worswick
2	Ricci Guarnaccio	27	Newcastle	Vicky Pattison

=== Duration of cast ===
Cast members	Episodes							
Cast members	1	2	3	4	5	6	7	8
Ashley								
Chloe								
Emily								
Farrah								
Jack								
Liam								
Marco								
Vicky								
Ross								
Frankie								
Talitha								
Emma Jane								
Dan								
Joss								
Shelby								
Ricci								

Table Key
Key: = "Cast member" is featured in this episode
Key: = "Cast member" arrives on the beach
Key: = "Cast member" has an ex arrive on the beach
Key: = "Cast member" arrives on the beach and has an ex arrive during the same episode
Key: = "Cast member" leaves the beach
Key: = "Cast member" does not feature in this episode

== Episodes ==
No. overall	No. in season	Title	Original release date	Duration	UK viewers
1	1	"Episode 1"	22 April 2014	60 minutes	759,000
Eight singles arrive at the beach hoping to find love completely unaware of what's about to hit them. Chloe is torn between Ashley and Marco as both compete for her affections, whereas Farah feels isolated from the group. Ross, the new arrival causes shockwaves as it becomes clear he has a secret past with Chloe, but as Vicky grows closer to him she becomes determined to get to the truth. The penny finally drops when the gang realise that they will soon be joined by their exes – but it's too late for Marco when his ex-girlfriend Frankie arrives hell-bent for revenge.
2	2	"Episode 2"	29 April 2014	60 minutes	706,000
It doesn't take long for Marco and Frankie to clear the air before they end up in bed together, but Liam decides to stir the pot by telling her that he actually likes Emily instead. Ashley is rocked when he's caught in a compromising position by his ex-girlfriend Talitha, whilst Ross and Vicky continue with their blossoming romance despite worries of stepping on Chloe's toes. Frankie becomes convinced that Emily is trying to steal Marco so unleashes her frustration, and Liam's lies begin to surface. Following a huge argument with the girls, Frankie packs her bags and vows to leave.
3	3	"Episode 3"	6 May 2014	60 minutes	749,000
Frankie lashes out at Marco once again for not defending her, whilst Ashley angers Talitha by flirting with Chloe in front of her face. Vicky's world is torn apart when Ross's ex Emma Jane turns up at the beach, and she soon realises everything may not be as they seem. Talitha gives Ashley a taste of his own medicine by flirting with Jack, and it's the end of the road for Vicky and Ross. Elsewhere Emily and Frankie's feud is reignited when the Tablet of Terror sends Emily on a date with Marco, and Chloe is upset after discovering Ross has blown her secret.
4	4	"Episode 4"	13 May 2014	60 minutes	722,000
Ashley's continuous flirting with Chloe riles Talitha. A face from Vicky's past turns up on the beach wanting to rekindle what they had but she faces the difficult task of telling him what she's previously got up to with Ross. Frankie is forced to leave the villa due to an illness much to the delight of Marco, whilst Chloe isolates herself from the girls after going from boy to boy. Ashley is left raging after finding out that Liam has been dripping poison in Talitha's ear, and Vicky is smitten with Dan – unaware that another ex is waiting in the wings.
5	5	"Episode 5"	20 May 2014	60 minutes	745,000
The truth begins to unravel as Marco and Ashley realise that Liam has been telling lies about them, as the girls are sent to bootcamp to bond with each other. Talitha is left devastated when her ex-boyfriend Joss shows up on the beach with a vendetta against Ashley – but there's more than meets the eye. Emily and Liam's camping date descends into chaos as the pair fall out, and Talitha panics that her secrets are about to spill when she sees Ashley and Joss clearing the air. Following another argument with Ashley, Liam decides to spread another rumour about him.
6	6	"Episode 6"	27 May 2014	60 minutes	789,000
Things turn awkward for Joss when Talitha tells him that she and Ashley are back together. Farah is head over heels for Joss until the arrival of his ex-girlfriend shakes things up, but it's Ross who grabs her attention. Chloe is knocked for six when Ross tells her he still has feelings for her before jumping into bed with Shelby, meanwhile Vicky grills Dan on his real intentions with her. Knowing that it's only a matter of time before the truth comes out, Talitha is forced to tell Ashley about her past kiss with Joss causing serious ructions in the villa.
7	7	"Episode 7"	3 June 2014	60 minutes	841,000
Talitha's lie proves to be the final nail in the coffin for her relationship with Ashley, and he wastes no time in turning back to Chloe. There's carnage at the beach when Ricci turns up to greet his ex-fiancée Vicky, and she fears that he could spell trouble for her blossoming romance with Dan. Liam can't believe his luck when he discovers that Ashley and Chloe have spent the night together and revels in telling Talitha. Meanwhile Joss makes a discovery of his own, Ross and Shelby get closer, and Talitha unleashes her building fury on Ashley.
8	8	"Episode 8"	10 June 2014	60 minutes	802,000
Tension rises in the villa as a divide forms between those on Team Vicky and Team Ricci. Shelby is put in an awkward position when she's forced to tell Ross that she's spent the night with Liam. Chloe makes herself unpopular with the girls by defending Ricci, and Liam goes a step too far causing another fight in the group. Ashley is removed from the villa due to aggressive behaviour, whilst Farah and Joss hit the rocks. Vicky and Ricci finally attempt to put aside their differences, and the group head to the beach for the final time.

== Ratings ==
Episode	Date	Official MTV rating	MTV weekly rank	Official MTV+1 rating	Total MTV viewers
Episode 1	22 April 2014	678,000	1	81,000	759,000
Episode 2	29 April 2014	631,000	1	75,000	706,000
Episode 3	6 May 2014	670,000	1	79,000	749,000
Episode 4	13 May 2014	626,000	1	96,000	722,000
Episode 5	20 May 2014	685,000	1	60,000	745,000
Episode 6	27 May 2014	726,000	1	63,000	789,000
Episode 7	3 June 2014	775,000	1	66,000	841,000
Episode 8	10 June 2014	680,000	1	122,000	802,000
Average viewers		684,000	1	80,000	764,000
