= Ashley Cain (footballer) =

Former English footballer

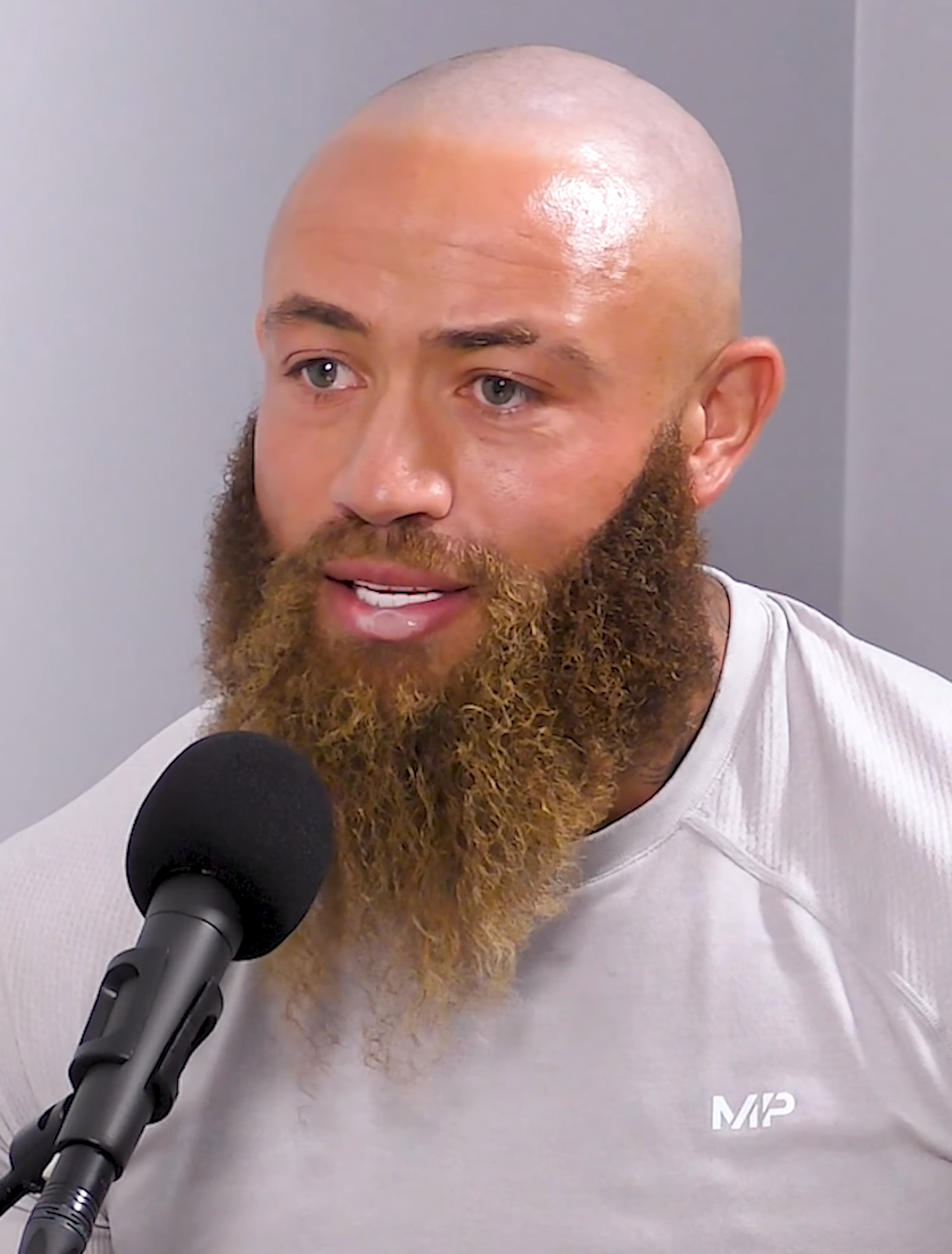
- Cain in 2023

Personal information
- Date of birth: 27 September 1990 (age 36)
- Place of birth: Nuneaton, England
- Position: Winger

Youth career
- Coventry City

Senior career*
Years	Team	Apps	(Gls)
2008–2010	Coventry City	7	(0)
2009	→ Luton Town (loan)	0	(0)
2010	→ Oxford United (loan)	1	(0)
2010–2011	Mansfield Town	20	(1)
2011–2012	Tamworth	16	(0)
2011–2012	→ AFC Telford United (loan)	7	(0)
2012	AFC Telford United	16	(0)
2012	CS Gaz Metan Mediaș	0	(0)
2013	Bedworth United	10	(1)
2013	Coventry Sphinx	18	(6)
2013–2014	Barwell		
2014	Coventry Sphinx	10	(3)
- * Club domestic league appearances and goals

Ashley Cain (born 27 September 1990) is an English reality TV personality and former footballer. He played as a winger for clubs including Coventry City, Luton Town, Oxford United and Mansfield Town.

== Career ==
Cain began his career with Coventry City. On 26 November 2009, he signed on a one-month loan with Conference Premier side Luton Town, making just one substitute appearance in a 0–0 draw at Chester City, although his only appearance for the club would later be wiped from the record books after Chester City folded later in the season and their record was expunged. On 19 February 2010, Cain joined Conference league leaders Oxford United on a one-month loan after scoring a hat-trick in the first 45 minutes against them in a mid season friendly match. He then had a trial with Port Vale in April 2010. In July 2010, he signed for Mansfield Town in the Conference Premier after a trial.

On 22 June 2011, Cain signed for Conference Premier side Tamworth. He was joined at the club the same day by former Coventry City teammate Liam Francis, who signed from Hednesford Town. On 18 November 2011, Cain was loaned to AFC Telford United until 5 January 2012. In January 2012 his contract was cancelled by Tamworth and he joined Telford on a permanent basis. He was released by the club in May 2012.

In June 2012, Cain signed for CS Gaz Metan Mediaș after a successful trial period. Cain was an MTV reality TV personality, starring in the series Ex on the Beach and competing on the 33rd season of the reality game show The Challenge.

== Personal life ==
Cain's daughter, Azaylia died on 24 April 2021, at eight months old. She was diagnosed with an aggressive form of leukaemia at eight weeks old. Before her death, Cain and his partner had raised more than £1.5 million to fund her specialist treatment in Singapore. In 2021, he and his partner announced that they were starting a charity in their daughter's name to fight childhood cancer.

His sons were born in January and November 2024.

=== Controversies ===
In December 2023, his ex Vorajee claimed in an interview with The Mirror: "I don't know why he would ask to have another baby with me knowing he's sleeping with someone else. When he asked me, it was the moment I'd been waiting for. I sighed with relief that we could reunite and have a family again. It was at Azaylia's garden, in front of our daughter, such a precious, safe space for us." In response Cain said "When there are intense emotions involved, be that from loss, breakups or my recent baby announcement, recollection of events may vary".

In June 2026, The Guardian reported that Cain had made abusive and misogynistic remarks about women on his public X (then known as Twitter) account between 2011 and 2015. The report also makes reference to an incident where Cain allegedly recorded videos of a sexual nature with a woman without consent which were subsequently shared on social media platform Snapchat. Cain deleted his X account following publication of the report.
