= List of Geordie Shore cast members =

This is a list of cast members who have appeared in Geordie Shore.

== Current cast ==
This is a list of the current cast members appearing in the show in order of their first appearance.

Cast member	Quote	Series	Episodes*	Year
Gaz Beadle	"I should have a degree in pulling women."	1–15, 26–	140	2011–17, 2026–
Holly Hagan	"I'm fake, I'm flirty and I've got double F's." (1–13, 18–19) "Guess who's back bitches." (17)	1–13, 17–19, 23–	154	2011–16, 2018–19, 2022–
Sophie Kasaei	"I could talk the back legs off a donkey!"	1–7, 13–19, 23–	158	2011–13, 2016–19, 2022–
Jay Gardner	"My biggest fear is getting wrinkles."	1–3, 6, 7, 23–	70	2011–13, 2016, 2022–
Ricci Guarnaccio	"Got the looks, got the charm; it just works."	2–5, 23–	70	2012–13, 2016, 2022–
Aaron Chalmers	"I'm cheeky, colourful, and full of mischief."	8–16, 23, 26–	98	2014–18, 2022, 2026–
Kyle Christie	"I'm gonna make sparks fly, and get everyone feisty."	8–11, 13, 23–	68	2014–16, 2022–
Nathan Henry	"I'm preened to perfection."	10–	165	2015–
Abbie Holborn	"I'm tanned, toned and ready to tash on."	14–18, 19, 20–	123	2017–

== Former cast ==
This is a list of the former cast members who have appeared in the show in order of their first appearance.

Cast member	Quote	Series	Episodes*	Year
James Tindale	"The hardest graft I've ever done is doing my hair."	1–10, 20–26	142	2011–16, 2019–26
Charlotte Crosby	"I would never kiss anyone without a six-pack"	1–12, 23–24	115	2011–16, 2022–24
Vicky Pattison	"I am a Geordie girl with a V.I.P. edge."	1–9	65	2011–14
Greg Lake	"Dress to impress - that's me."	1, 23	9	2011, 2022
Rebecca Walker	"I've got a bangin' body, and the banter to match."	2–3	16	2012
Scotty T	"Get me in this house 'cause I'm gonna tear the place up." (4–15) "I cannot believe anyone would put me in charge of this lot" (18–19)	4–15, 18–19, 23, 25	114	2012–19, 2022, 2025
Dan Thomas-Tuck	"If you look up 'pulling' in the dictionary, my name would be next to it."	4–5, BB	20	2012–13, 2016
Marnie Simpson	"I'm a natural beauty; real boobs, real hair."	7–16, 23–26	123	2013–18, 2022–26
Chloe Ferry	"I'm Totally crackers me like."	10–26	175	2015–26
Marty McKenna	"My quiff's pure lethal and my banter's pure naughty."	12–15, 22–23	47	2016–17, 2021–22
Chantelle Connelly	"I'm radge and I'm gonna wrap the lads around my little finger." "I'm real and I'm radge."	12–13, 23–26	56	2016, 2022–26
Zahida Allen	—N/a	14, 23	18	2017, 2022
Elettra Lamborghini	—N/a	14, 15	7	2017
Sam Gowland	"I'm a lad with as much cheek as a girl with fillers."	16–20, 23	55	2018–19, 2024
Stephanie Snowdon	"I might be a tiny bit bonkers, but all the best people are."	16	10	2018
Adam Guthrie	"I'm happy-go-lucky, bit of a Jack the Lad; that's me to a T."	17–18, 19, 20	20	2018–19
Alex MacPherson	"I don't go on the pull, the girls just love the guns."	17, 18, 19	20	2018–19
Dee Nguyen	"I'm a whole lotta sass with a whole lotta ass"	17	12	2018
Nick Murdoch	"I'm a bad boy with a good heart"	17	12	2018
Grant Molloy	"Sometimes good, sometimes bad, but never ugly"	17	6	2018
Chrysten Zenoni	"I'm an Aussie pocket rocket"	17	5	2018
Faith Mullen	"What you see is what you get, bags of fun."	18	10	2018
Bethan Kershaw	"Sometimes bubbly sometimes bitchy; I'm all over the place."	19–23	46	2019–22
Beau Brennan	"I'm that good looking I'd even neck on with myself."	19–21	28	2019–20
Natalie Phillips	"I might look rough and ready but I'm a massive softie."	19–21	26	2019–20
Tahlia Chung	"I might dance like a grandad but I'm proper radge."	19–20	20	2019
Amelia Lily	"I cannot wait to show my wild side."	21–23	24	2020–22
Anthony Kennedy	"I'm a lover not a fighter."	21–23	22	2020–22
Louis Shaw	"I'm a bit of a rascal, but that's why everyone loves me."	21–23	22	2020–22

- ^*: All episode counts are correct as of Series 26, episode 10.

== Duration of cast ==
Current cast members
Cast member	Series 1						MM		Series 2								Series 3								Series 4								Series 5								Series 6								Series 7						Series 8								Series 9								Series 10								Series 11										Series 12								BBB						Series 13										Series 14												Series 15									Series 16										Series 17												Series 18										Series 19										Series 20										Series 21								Series 22										Series 23										Series 24										Series 25										Series 26									
Cast member	1	2	3	4	5	6	1	2	1	2	3	4	5	6	7	8	1	2	3	4	5	6	7	8	1	2	3	4	5	6	7	8	1	2	3	4	5	6	7	8	1	2	3	4	5	6	7	8	1	2	3	4	5	6	1	2	3	4	5	6	7	8	1	2	3	4	5	6	7	8	1	2	3	4	5	6	7	8	1	2	3	4	5	6	7	8	9	10	1	2	3	4	5	6	7	8	1	2	3	4	5	6	1	2	3	4	5	6	7	8	9	10	1	2	3	4	5	6	7	8	9	10	11	12	1	2	3	4	5	6	7	8	9	1	2	3	4	5	6	7	8	9	10	1	2	3	4	5	6	7	8	9	10	11	12	1	2	3	4	5	6	7	8	9	10	1	2	3	4	5	6	7	8	9	10	1	2	3	4	5	6	7	8	9	10	1	2	3	4	5	6	7	8	1	2	3	4	5	6	7	8	9	10	1	2	3	4	5	6	7	8	9	10	1	2	3	4	5	6	7	8	9	10	1	2	3	4	5	6	7	8	9	10	1	2	3	4	5	6	7	8	9	10
Gary																																																																																																																																																																																																																																																			
Holly																																																																																																																																																																																																																																																			
Jason																																																																																																																																																																																																																																																			
Sophie																																																																																																																																																																																																																																																			
Ricci																																																																																																																																																																																																																																																			
Aaron C																																																																																																																																																																																																																																																			
Kyle C																																																																																																																																																																																																																																																			
Nathan																																																																																																																																																																																																																																																			
Abbie																																																																																																																																																																																																																																																			
Former cast members
Cast member	Series 1						MM		Series 2								Series 3								Series 4								Series 5								Series 6								Series 7						Series 8								Series 9								Series 10								Series 11										Series 12								BBB						Series 13										Series 14												Series 15									Series 16										Series 17												Series 18										Series 19										Series 20										Series 21								Series 22										Series 23										Series 24										Series 25										Series 26									
Cast member	1	2	3	4	5	6	1	2	1	2	3	4	5	6	7	8	1	2	3	4	5	6	7	8	1	2	3	4	5	6	7	8	1	2	3	4	5	6	7	8	1	2	3	4	5	6	7	8	1	2	3	4	5	6	1	2	3	4	5	6	7	8	1	2	3	4	5	6	7	8	1	2	3	4	5	6	7	8	1	2	3	4	5	6	7	8	9	10	1	2	3	4	5	6	7	8	1	2	3	4	5	6	1	2	3	4	5	6	7	8	9	10	1	2	3	4	5	6	7	8	9	10	11	12	1	2	3	4	5	6	7	8	9	1	2	3	4	5	6	7	8	9	10	1	2	3	4	5	6	7	8	9	10	11	12	1	2	3	4	5	6	7	8	9	10	1	2	3	4	5	6	7	8	9	10	1	2	3	4	5	6	7	8	9	10	1	2	3	4	5	6	7	8	1	2	3	4	5	6	7	8	9	10	1	2	3	4	5	6	7	8	9	10	1	2	3	4	5	6	7	8	9	10	1	2	3	4	5	6	7	8	9	10	1	2	3	4	5	6	7	8	9	10
James																																																																																																																																																																																																																																																			
Charlotte																																																																																																																																																																																																																																																			
Vicky																																																																																																																																																																																																																																																			
Greg																																																																																																																																																																																																																																																			
Rebecca																																																																																																																																																																																																																																																			
Scott																																																																																																																																																																																																																																																			
Daniel																																																																																																																																																																																																																																																			
Marnie																																																																																																																																																																																																																																																			
Chloe F																																																																																																																																																																																																																																																			
Chantelle																																																																																																																																																																																																																																																			
Marty																																																																																																																																																																																																																																																			
Zahida																																																																																																																																																																																																																																																			
Sarah																																																																																																																																																																																																																																																			
Billy																																																																																																																																																																																																																																																			
Eve																																																																																																																																																																																																																																																			
Elettra																																																																																																																																																																																																																																																			
Samuel																																																																																																																																																																																																																																																			
Chelsea																																																																																																																																																																																																																																																			
Sam																																																																																																																																																																																																																																																			
Stephanie																																																																																																																																																																																																																																																			
Alexander																																																																																																																																																																																																																																																			
Dee																																																																																																																																																																																																																																																			
Nick																																																																																																																																																																																																																																																			
Grant																																																																																																																																																																																																																																																			
Chrysten																																																																																																																																																																																																																																																			
Adam																																																																																																																																																																																																																																																			
Faith																																																																																																																																																																																																																																																			
Bethan																																																																																																																																																																																																																																																			
Beau																																																																																																																																																																																																																																																			
Nathalie																																																																																																																																																																																																																																																			
Tahlia																																																																																																																																																																																																																																																			
Amelia																																																																																																																																																																																																																																																			
Anthony																																																																																																																																																																																																																																																			
Louis																																																																																																																																																																																																																																																			

=== Notes ===
Key: = Cast member is featured in this episode.
Key: = Cast member arrives in the house.
Key: = Cast member voluntarily leaves the house.
Key: = Cast member leaves and returns to the house in the same episode.
Key: = Cast member joins the series, but leaves the same episode.
Key: = Cast member returns to the house.
Key: = Cast member features in this episode, but outside of the house.
Key: = Cast member does not feature in this episode.
Key: = Cast member leaves the series.
Key: = Cast member returns to the series.
Key: = Cast member is removed from the series.
Key: = Cast member features in this episode despite not being an official cast member at the time.
Key: = Cast member returns to the series, but leaves same episode.

== Cast changes ==
The original cast members were: Gary "Gaz" Beadle, Charlotte-Letitia Crosby, Jay Gardner, Holly Hagan, Greg Lake, Sophie Kasaei, Vicky Pattison and James Tindale. Lake made a guest appearance in the opening episode of series 2 where he announced his departure. He was replaced by Ricci Guarnaccio and Rebecca Walker. The third series saw no cast member changes.

After the third series, Gardner and Walker exited the show and auditions were held to find their replacements for the fourth series of Geordie Shore. Daniel Thomas-Tuck and Scott Timlin joined the cast. The fifth series saw no cast member changes.

On 2 April 2013, it was announced that Thomas-Tuck and Guarnaccio had left Geordie Shore and would not be returning for the sixth series. On 9 April 2013 it was confirmed that former cast member Jay Gardner, who featured from series 1–3, would be returning briefly for the sixth series. The sixth series began 9 July 2013. On 12 July 2013 it was announced that Sophie Kasaei had been sacked from the show following an incident which took place in a nightclub where she used a racist term off camera. Sophie will have appeared in the show from series 1–7. On 13 August 2013, it was confirmed that Sophie's cousin, Marnie Simpson had joined the cast for Series 7. On 24 September 2013, it was revealed that Jay Gardner would make another brief return to the series, this time in the seventh series.

On 4 April 2014, it was announced that 26-year-old Aaron Chalmers had joined the cast for the eighth series. He had previously appeared during the second series when he took Holly out for a date. It was then confirmed on 10 June 2014, that Kyle Christie had also joined the cast for the eighth series. He has previously hooked up with Charlotte and Vicky, and is a friend of Marnie's. On 28 October 2014, it was revealed that the upcoming ninth series of the show would be Vicky's last series. On 17 November 2014, despite a tenth series already being announced, it was confirmed that this would be James' last series after he would be axed from the show at the end of the series. On 29 November 2014, it was confirmed that Chloe Etherington had joined the cast for the tenth series. It was also confirmed that Nathan Henry had joined the cast for this series.

In 2015, during the eleventh series, Kyle Christie made his final appearance after his turbulent relationship with Holly broke down. In November 2015 it was confirmed that Chantelle Connelly and Marty McKenna had joined the cast for the twelfth series. Marty had previously appeared during the third series of Ex on the Beach. Marnie also left at the end of the eleventh series because of the engagement proposal to former The Only Way Is Essex star Ricky Rayment, however her circumstances changed and rejoined for the twelfth series. In the Big Birthday Battle, former cast mates returned. These were Dan, Jay, James, Ricci, Sophie and Kyle (not in a certain order).

On 1 June 2016, Charlotte Crosby announced that she had quit Geordie Shore meaning that the Big Birthday Battle would be her final series. It was later confirmed that Sophie would replace her as she had expressed her desire to return following the Big Birthday Battle. Chantelle departed the cast during the thirteenth series meaning the series would be her last. Also in the thirteenth series Kyle rejoined following making up with Holly during the Big Birthday Battle series.

It was announced that the thirteenth series trailer in October 2016, meant the cast would be in Magaluf, Ibiza, Kavos and Ayia Napa. During filming series 13, it was cited that Sophie Kasaei had made another comeback since Big Birthday Battle earlier in the year. In December 2016, it was announced that Holly and Kyle would be leaving Geordie Shore together in the thirteenth series finale.

In November 2016, the cast announced via Twitter that filming for the fourteenth series had commenced and Sophie Kasaei had made yet another comeback, however she had permanently rejoined the main cast since her departure in the seventh series. Abbie Holborn was selected to become permanent. Season fifteenth featured the departure of Marty McKenna and Scott Timlin after they were both fired from the show, it was also the last season to feature original cast member Gaz Beadle following his decision to resign. Elettra Lamborghini visits the cast while they were in Rome.

Series sixteenth featured new cast members Sam Gowland and Stephanie Snowdon. Aaron Chalmers and Marnie Simpson announced their departure, this being their final season. It was later announced that Snowdon was fired. Season seventeen introduced five new cast members: Alex MacPherson, Chrysten Zenoni, Dee Nguyen, Grant Molloy, and Nick Murdoch. Chrysten and Grant then left the season. The new cast member Adam Guthrie has also joined in to replace Grant. Holly Hagan returned as a main member after her last appearance during the thirteenth season. After the seventeenth season, Dee and Nick did not return to the show. Alex also left at the end of the seventeenth season, however, he rejoined the eighteenth season. Faith Mullen joined the cast in the eighteenth season. Scott Timlin returned to the show in the role of boss.

Faith Mullen, Abbie Holborn and Adam Guthrie did not return for the nineteenth season, however the last two appeared on a recurring basis throughout this season. Alex also left the show, however, he returned a second time. Before the series, four new cast members were confirmed, Beau Brennan, Bethan Kershaw, Natalie Phillips, and Tahlia Chung. That season featured the latest appearances from Scott Timlin and Alex MacPherson, and original cast members Sophie Kasaei and Holly Hagan.

In the twentieth season it was confirmed that former cast members Abbie Holborn and James Tindale returned. Sam Gowland and Tahlia Chung left the show after that season. For the twenty-first season, new cast members Amelia Lily, Anthony Kennedy, and Louis Shaw joined the cast. Nathalie Phillips left the program. Beau Brennan did not return to the show after the twenty-first season. The twenty-second season switched to a dating format and featured a group of rookies acting as dates for the cast members, Marty McKenna returned to the show after being fired in the fifteenth season.

The twenty-third reunion season saw the return of original cast members Charlotte Crosby, Holly Hagan, Sophie Kasaei, James Tindale, and Jay Gardner, and Greg Lake made a brief appearance. Veterans Ricci Guarnaccio, Scott Timlin, Marnie Simpson, Kyle Christie, and Aaron Chalmers also returned, in addition to Zahida Allen and Chantelle Connelly, this on the occasion of the majority of the show's overall cast meeting for the tenth anniversary of the program.

After the reunion series, Marty McKenna was fired from the show. Zahida Allen, Amelia Lily, Anthony Kennedy and Louis Shaw left the show after that season. In series twenty-four, the majority of the cast was largely made up of those who returned during the previous series. While Sam Gowland made a brief appearance.

Season twenty-five featured the same cast from the last two seasons. Charlotte Crosby announced her departure from the show last season. Scott Timlin returned to the show since his last appearance in season 23. Before the premiere of the twenty-sixth season, the departure of Scott Timlin was announced, as well as the return of veterans Gary Beadle and Aaron Chalmers. This was the last season to feature James Tindale, Chloe Ferry, Chantelle Connelly, and Marnie Simpson.

For the twenty-seventh season, the rest of the cast reunited in France to celebrate Jay Gardner's 40th birthday, while documenting the pregnancies of Holly Hagan, Sophie Kasei, and Kyle Christie's wife, as well as the subsequent birth of their babies.
