= Geordie Shore series 13 =

Geordie Shore
- Series 13
- No. of episodes: 10

Release
- Original network: MTV
- Original release: 25 October – 20 December 2016

Series chronology
- ← Previous; Big Birthday Battle Next → Series 14

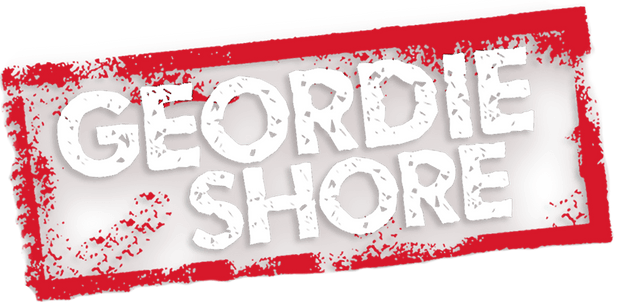
Logo for Geordie Shore

The thirteenth series of Geordie Shore, a British television programme based in Newcastle upon Tyne was confirmed on 23 May 2015 when it was confirmed that MTV had renewed the series for a further three series taking it up to the thirteenth series, and began on 25 October 2016. The series was filmed in June and July 2016 and concluded on 20 December 2016. This was the first series not to include Charlotte Crosby since she made her exit during the previous series. It also features the return of former cast members Sophie Kasaei and Kyle Christie who previously made a brief return during the Big Birthday Battle anniversary series, and is the last to feature Chantelle Connelly after it was revealed she quit the show mid-series. This series was filmed in various party resort towns in island destinations, including Ayia Napa, Corfu, Kavos, Ibiza and Magaluf. It was also later announced that this would be Holly Hagan's last series after she quit in the series finale, along with Kyle Christie.

== Cast ==
- Aaron Chalmers
- Chantelle Connelly
- Chloe Ferry
- Gaz Beadle
- Holly Hagan
- Kyle Christie
- Marnie Simpson
- Marty McKenna
- Nathan Henry
- Scott Timlin
- Sophie Kasaei

=== Duration of cast ===
Cast members
Cast members	1	2	3	4	5	6	7	8	9	10
Aaron										
Chantelle										
Chloe										
Gaz										
Holly										
Kyle										
Marnie										
Marty										
Nathan										
Scott										
Sophie										

= Cast member is featured in this episode.
= Cast member voluntarily leaves the house.
= Cast member returns to the house.
= Cast member leaves the series.
= Cast member returns to the series.
= Cast member does not feature in this episode.
= Cast member is not officially a cast member in this episode.

== Episodes ==
No. overall	No. in season	Title	Original release date	Viewers (millions)
95	1	"Episode 1"	25 October 2016	0.966
The Geordies are back! After jetting off to Magaluf, Marnie and Holly are having issues while Marty opens up to Chloe. Things are going well until Chloe gets jealous and it all kicks off.
96	2	"Episode 2"	2 November 2016	0.991
At a boat party in Ibiza, Aaron drop the G-bomb on Marnie, and single Gaz is back when he pulls Chantelle. But how will Holly react when she finds out?
97	3	"Episode 3"	8 November 2016	1.046
Big boss Anna is fuming when the squad finally return from Ibiza. Marnie's plan to get Aaron's attention backfires and the couple reach crisis point when Nathan gets involved.
98	4	"Episode 4"	15 November 2016	0.879
Chloe gets jealous of Holly and Marty and kicks off. Scott receives some big news and there's a shock arrival which has huge consequences for Gaz and Chantelle.
99	5	"Episode 5"	22 November 2016	0.979
It's seriously awks between Sophie, Gaz and Chantelle. Aaron finally returns but Marnie isn't happy. Chantelle and Marty clash over Chloe. Nathan takes getting mortal to the next level.
100	6	"Geordie Shore: 100th Episode"	29 November 2016	0.979
It's the morning after Chantelle's departure... Sophie gets some big news from boss Anna, Aaron ends up in an ambulance and Chloe goes all out to get over Marty at the pool party.
101	7	"Episode 7"	6 December 2016	0.997
Marty ends up in hospital after the beach party. Meanwhile Boss Anna has some big news for Sophie, Nathan has an unusual plan to help Chloe, and Gaz comes to a decision over Charlotte.
102	8	"Episode 8"	13 December 2016	0.989
It's Holly's birthday and she gets a massive surprise when Kyle shows up. Marty goes in on Chloe but takes it too far. Meanwhile, Aaron and Marnie's relationship reaches breaking point.
103	9	"Episode 9"	20 December 2016	0.889
The Geordies reach boiling point...Marty tries to make it up to Chloe, but will she forgive him? And is there any way back for Aaron and Marnie after the previous night's break up?
104	10	"Episode 10"	20 December 2016	0.805
In the series finale Chloe and Marty get flirty again, but can they really stay just good friends? Kyle gets some big news from Boss Anna, but the fallout will change the family forever.

== Ratings ==
Episode	Date	Official MTV rating	MTV weekly rank	Official MTV+1 rating	Total MTV viewers
Episode 1	25 October 2016	941,000	1	25,000	966,000
Episode 2	1 November 2016	971,000	1	20,000	991,000
Episode 3	8 November 2016	1,020,000	1	26,000	1,046,000
Episode 4	15 November 2016	858,000	1	21,000	879,000
Episode 5	22 November 2016	920,000	1	59,000	979,000
Episode 6	29 November 2016	926,000	1	53,000	979,000
Episode 7	6 December 2016	965,000	1	32,000	997,000
Episode 8	13 December 2016	969,000	1	20,000	989,000
Episode 9	20 December 2016	866,000	1	23,000	889,000
Episode 10	20 December 2016	765,000	1	40,000	805,000
