= Geordie Shore series 7 =

Geordie Shore
- Series 7
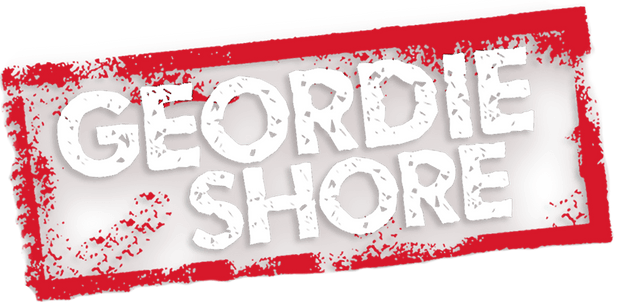
- No. of episodes: 6

Release
- Original network: MTV
- Original release: 17 September – 22 October 2013

Series chronology
- ← Previous; Series 6 Next → Series 8

The seventh series of Geordie Shore, a British television programme based in Newcastle upon Tyne, was announced on 5 July 2013 after cast members Holly Hagan and Vicky Pattison had been arrested for assault on a night out during filming. The series began on 17 September 2013, just three weeks after Series 6 had concluded, and finished airing on 22 October 2013 after six episodes. This series had a shorter run that usual due to filming being postponed after the night of the assault. It was reported that filming for the series began on 26 June 2013 as the cast members had all been absent from Twitter since then. This was the last series to feature Sophie Kasaei after she was axed from the series following a racial slur. It was also the first series to feature Sophie's cousin, Marnie Simpson and included the brief return of Jay Gardner, who had previously featured in series one to three, and again during the sixth series for two episodes. Following Vicky's arrest, she was absent from the final half of the series. This series included the cast members taking part in a number of activities on their bucket list, new cast member Marnie isolating herself after breaking up the friendship between Gaz and Scott, and Jay returning to fix the drift between the cast members.

== Cast ==
- Charlotte-Letitia Crosby
- Gary Beadle
- Holly Hagan
- James Tindale
- Jay Gardner
- Marnie Simpson
- Scott Timlin
- Sophie Kasaei
- Vicky Pattison

=== Duration of cast ===
Cast members
Cast members	1	2	3	4	5	6
Charlotte						
Gaz						
Holly						
James						
Jay						
Marnie						
Scotty T						
Sophie						
Vicky						

= Cast member is featured in this episode.
= Cast member arrives in the house.
= Cast member voluntarily leaves the house.
= Cast member leaves and returns to the house in the same episode.
= Cast member returns to the house.
= Cast member does not feature in this episode.
= Cast member is not officially a cast member in this episode.
= Cast member returns to the series.
= Cast member is removed from the house.

== Episodes ==
No. overall	No. in season	Title	Original release date	Viewers (millions)
47	1	"The Bucket List"	17 September 2013	1.010
The arrival of Sophie's cousin, Marnie causes tension in the house and Holly is far from impressed when she sees her flirting with Scott. Gaz is surprised when he gets close with Charlotte again despite her having a boyfriend, and determined to fix all the problems in the group, Vicky warns Charlotte and Marnie about their behaviour towards both boys. For their bucket list, Charlotte gets pet chickens for the house, whilst James and Vicky attempt to fly a plane. Sophie is torn between her cousin's feelings towards Scott and Holly's heartache.
48	2	"Double Dating"	24 September 2013	1.024
Marnie and Scott's continuous flirting angers the girls in the group and Gaz thinks he's losing his best friend. An argument with Marnie after a night out with causes Scott to wreck the house then leave before returning the next morning. Charlotte has relationship troubles at home so leaves the house to fix things with Mitch. Sophie loses patience with her cousin until Joel arrives to fix the family divide. Vicky isn't impressed when Marnie asks to go out with the boys after originally planning to stay in with the girls. Charlotte's upset after discovering that Egg is ill.
49	3	"Holly's Birthday"	1 October 2013	1.031
Charlotte is distraught after hearing that Egg has died, and the group go to a memorial at the beach to spread his ashes. Anna reveals that Sophie and Vicky have left the house. Holly's 21st birthday causes drama as she prepares for a huge house party, but following an argument with her about Kate, James leaves the house refusing to go to the party. Scott and Marnie clash as Marnie kisses one of Scott's friends after originally agreeing not to. Gaz is shocked at Marnie when she climbs into bed with him and her friend, but she then worries that Scott may find out.
50	4	"It All Kicks Off"	8 October 2013	1.052
When Anna asks Gaz and Marnie to go to work together, Charlotte and Holly are convinced they will get up to something behind Scott's back so hatch a plan to follow them. After seeing the pair flirting, Charlotte and Holly have no choice but confront them causing a huge fight in a club. With Marnie leaving the house following the events, Scott also decides to take a break. Jay returns to the house to fix all the problems. To clear the air, Scott rejoins the group as they all go on a trip to Scotland, but there's clear tension between Gaz and Scott.
51	5	"First Impressions Stick"	15 October 2013	1.054
Jay leaves the house having brought the family back together, but there’s still one thing on everybody’s mind; Marnie! The girls make a scene when she returns to patch things up with Scott, and Charlotte is left questioning the boy’s loyalties. Holly worries that Gaz and Charlotte are getting close again, and Marnie finally makes amends with the girls when they see her dancing on her own all night. The group head to London for their item on their bucket list, where Marnie gives Scott an ultimatum and Mitch turns up on a night out drunk and kicking off with Charlotte. Holly isn’t impressed when Charlotte chooses going home with Mitch over staying with the group.
52	6	"So Much for Family Night"	22 October 2013	1.068
Holly continues to wallow as it sinks in that Charlotte chose Mitch over the group, and she has a lot of apologising to do when she returns to the house. After overhearing a negative conversation about her boyfriend, Charlotte has no choice but to pack her bags and leave. Marnie considers having sex with Scott but is left red faced when she catches him attempting to pull girls on the last night. Holly gets emotional after realising nobody cares about family night anymore, and Gaz plans the last item on the bucket list. With Marnie and Scott still confused over their feeling for each other, everybody says goodbye before leaving the house.

== Ratings ==
Episode	Date	Official MTV rating	MTV weekly rank	Official MTV+1 rating	Total MTV viewers
Episode 1	17 September 2013	888,000	1	122,000	1,010,000
Episode 2	24 September 2013	934,000	1	90,000	1,024,000
Episode 3	1 October 2013	926,000	1	105,000	1,031,000
Episode 4	8 October 2013	993,000	1	59,000	1,052,000
Episode 5	15 October 2013	961,000	1	93,000	1,054,000
Episode 6	22 October 2013	933,000	1	135,000	1,068,000
