= Geordie Shore series 24 =

British television programme

Geordie Shore
- Series 24
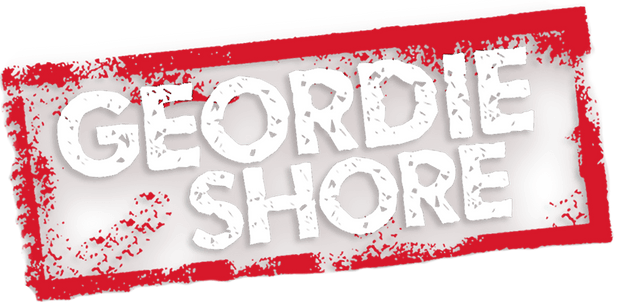
- No. of episodes: 10

Release
- Original network: MTV; Paramount+
- Original release: 9 January – 5 March 2024

Series chronology
- ← Previous; Series 23 Next → Series 25

The twenty-fourth series of Geordie Shore, a British television programme based in Newcastle upon Tyne was confirmed on 6 December 2023, and began airing on 9 January 2024. After last season the original cast reunited again in a mansion in Cyprus. Bethan Kershaw, Amelia Lily, Anthony Kennedy and Louis Shaw did not return to the show after the previous season. Before this season premiered, Charlotte Crosby announced her departure from the show.

== Cast ==
As in reunion season, the cast is shown with their husbands and children. Includes original cast members Charlotte Crosby, Holly Hagan, Sophie Kasaei, James Tindale and Jay Gardner. And to veterans Ricci Guarnaccio, Marnie Simpson, Kyle Christie, Chantelle Connelly, Chloe Ferry, Nathan Henry and Abbie Holborn. It also recurringly features Casey Johnson and Jacob Blyth from Geordie Shore OGs, Jake Ankers, Jordan Brook from TOWIE and Vicky Turner, the romantic partners of Marnie, Holly, Charlotte, Sophie and Kyle respectively. Sam Gowland made a brief appearance on the show.

=== Duration of cast ===
| Cast members | 1 | 2 | 3 | 4 | 5 | 6 | 7 | 8 | 9 | 10 |
| Abbie | | | | | | | | | | |
| Chantelle | | | | | | | | | | |
| Charlotte | | | | | | | | | | |
| Chloe | | | | | | | | | | |
| Holly | | | | | | | | | | |
| James | | | | | | | | | | |
| Jay | | | | | | | | | | |
| Kyle | | | | | | | | | | |
| Marnie | | | | | | | | | | |
| Nathan | | | | | | | | | | |
| Ricci | | | | | | | | | | |
| Sophie | | | | | | | | | | |
Special Guest
| Sam | | | | | | | | | | |

= Cast member is featured in this episode
= Cast member leaves the series
= Cast member returns to the series
= Cast member does not feature in this episode
= Cast member features in this episode despite not being an official cast member at the time
= Cast member is not officially a cast member in this episode

== Episodes ==
| No. overall | No. in season | Title | Original release date |
|---|---|---|---|
| 206 | 1 | "The Geordie's Are Back!" | 9 January 2024 |
| 207 | 2 | "The Big Day!" | 9 January 2024 |
| 208 | 3 | "Ground Rules" | 16 January 2024 |
| 209 | 4 | "Mams at War!" | 23 January 2024 |
| 210 | 5 | "Will She Stay or Will She Go?" | 30 January 2024 |
| 211 | 6 | "Mam's to the Rescue" | 6 February 2024 |
| 212 | 7 | "A Case of the Ex" | 13 February 2024 |
| 213 | 8 | "Carnage and Closure!" | 20 February 2024 |
| 214 | 9 | "Back to the Toon" | 27 February 2024 |
| 215 | 10 | "New Beginnings" | 5 March 2024 |
