= Geordie Shore series 8 =

Geordie Shore
- Series 8
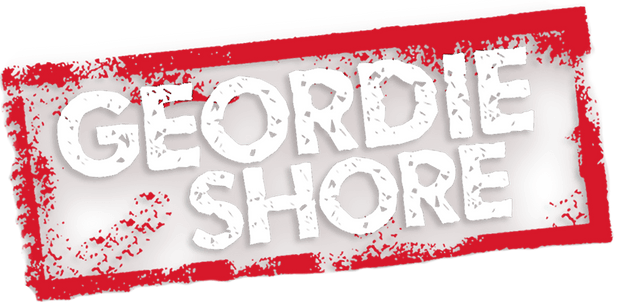
- No. of episodes: 8

Release
- Original network: MTV
- Original release: 22 July – 9 September 2014

Series chronology
- ← Previous; Series 7 Next → Series 9

The eighth series of Geordie Shore, a British television programme based in Newcastle upon Tyne was confirmed in October 2013 after cast member Holly Hagan announced it on Twitter and is expected to air 22 July 2014. Filming began for this series on 25 March 2014. This series will be the first not to feature former cast member Sophie Kasaei after she was axed during the seventh series. All other cast members from the previous series return with the addition of new cast member Aaron Chalmers who had briefly appeared during series two of the show as a one-night stand of Holly's. In May 2014, Gaz announced that the series would begin in July. An exclusive first trailer for the series was released during an episode of Ex On The Beach on 3 June 2014. It was revealed on 10 June 2014 that another new cast member had joined, 21-year-old Kyle Christie.

== Cast ==
- Aaron Chalmers
- Charlotte-Letitia Crosby
- Gary Beadle
- Holly Hagan
- James Tindale
- Kyle Christie
- Marnie Simpson
- Scott Timlin
- Vicky Pattison

=== Duration of cast ===
Cast members
| Cast members | 1 | 2 | 3 | 4 | 5 | 6 | 7 | 8 |
| Aaron | | | | | | | | |
| Charlotte | | | | | | | | |
| Gaz | | | | | | | | |
| Holly | | | | | | | | |
| James | | | | | | | | |
| Kyle | | | | | | | | |
| Marnie | | | | | | | | |
| Scott | | | | | | | | |
| Vicky | | | | | | | | |

= Cast member is featured in this episode.
= Cast member arrives in the house.
= Cast member voluntarily leaves the house.
= Cast member leaves and returns to the house in the same episode.
= Cast member returns to the house.
= Cast member does not feature in this episode.
= Cast member is not officially a cast member in this episode.

== Episodes ==
| No. overall | No. in season | Title | Original release date | Viewers (millions) |
|---|---|---|---|---|
| 53 | 1 | "Gaz's Birthday" | 22 July 2014 | 1.162 |
The Geordies are back, and during their first night on the Toon getting mortal Gaz arrives with a surprise: his name is Aaron, he's Gaz's mate, and he's the new lad in the Geordie Shore house.
| 54 | 2 | "Lad Code" | 29 July 2014 | 1.160 |
New boy Aaron has made it his mission to get with Holly but Holly wants to know if he's serious, so she gives him a task to complete.
| 55 | 3 | "The Family's Reunited" | 5 August 2014 | 1.175 |
Charlotte's back! And her arrival couldn't have come at a worse time, as she walks in on a double date and finds out all about Gaz getting with Marnie.
| 56 | 4 | "Tash On Tours" | 12 August 2014 | 1.031 |
With Charlotte back in the house, all eyes are on Gaz and Marnie and whether they'll decide to continue sleeping together.
| 57 | 5 | "The New Boy" | 19 August 2014 | 0.936 |
Things kick off in the house as Aaron hears Vicky and the girls slagging him off on the eve of his third date with Vicky.
| 58 | 6 | "A Trip to Iceland" | 26 August 2014 | 1.053 |
New boy Kyle gets properly settled into the house by spending the night with Holly!
| 59 | 7 | "Marnie Exposes Gary" | 2 September 2014 | 1.022 |
The group wake up in Iceland with mixed feelings. The girls are angry with the lads for 'pie-ing' them last night and pulling girls.
| 60 | 8 | "Aye Do" | 9 September 2014 | 1.063 |
Will Aaron and Marnie finally get together and will Gaz and Scott make up after Gaz broke his own Lad Code?

== Ratings ==
| Episode | Date | Official MTV rating | MTV weekly rank | Official MTV+1 rating | Total MTV viewers |
|---|---|---|---|---|---|
| Episode 1 | 22 July 2014 | 1,079,000 | 1 | 83,000 | 1,162,000 |
| Episode 2 | 29 July 2014 | 1,073,000 | 1 | 87,000 | 1,160,000 |
| Episode 3 | 5 August 2014 | 1,081,000 | 1 | 94,000 | 1,175,000 |
| Episode 4 | 12 August 2014 | 969,000 | 1 | 62,000 | 1,031,000 |
| Episode 5 | 19 August 2014 | 854,000 | 1 | 82,000 | 936,000 |
| Episode 6 | 26 August 2014 | 962,000 | 1 | 91,000 | 1,053,000 |
| Episode 7 | 2 September 2014 | 961,000 | 1 | 61,000 | 1,022,000 |
| Episode 8 | 9 September 2014 | 969,000 | 1 | 94,000 | 1,063,000 |
