= Geordie Shore series 4 =

Geordie Shore
- Series 4
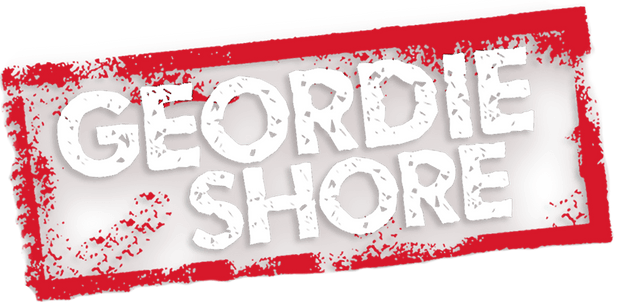
- No. of episodes: 8

Release
- Original network: MTV
- Original release: 6 November – 18 December 2012

Season chronology
- ← Previous; Series 3 Next → Series 5

The fourth series of Geordie Shore, a British television programme based in Newcastle upon Tyne, began airing on 6 November 2012 on MTV. The series concluded on 18 December 2012 with a double bill after 8 episodes, the series ended on a double bill to avoid the final episode airing on Christmas Day. This was the first series to feature Daniel Thomas-Tuck and Scott Timlin and is the highest rated series to date with 4 episodes receiving over 1,000,000 viewers. The series includes Vicky and Ricci's ongoing arguments continue to the point of the engagement being temporarily called off, James leaving Holly distraught by the announcement of him having a girlfriend, and a huge bust-up between Vicky and Sophie which has the whole house divided.

== Cast ==
- Charlotte-Letitia Crosby
- Daniel Thomas-Tuck
- Gary Beadle
- Holly Hagan
- James Tindale
- Ricci Guarnaccio
- Scott Timlin
- Sophie Kasaei
- Vicky Pattison

=== Duration of cast ===
Cast members
Cast members	1	2	3	4	5	6	7	8
Charlotte								
Dan								
Gaz								
Holly								
James								
Ricci								
Scott								
Sophie								
Vicky								

= Cast member is featured in this episode.
= Cast member arrives in the house.
= Cast member voluntarily leaves the house.
= Cast member is removed from the house.
= Cast member leaves and returns to the house in the same episode.
= Cast member returns to the house.
= Cast member does not feature in this episode.

== Episodes ==
No. overall	No. in season	Title	Original release date	Viewers (millions)
23	1	"Gary Meets His Match"	6 November 2012	0.975
As the cast arrive back in the Geordie Shore house, they're joined by Scott and Dan. Charlotte reveals she's got a boyfriend but Gaz gets overprotective over her when Dan gets too drunk and tries it on. Following the drama from the first night, Dan apologises to everyone. Anna announces that the group's new job is massaging, and Vicky asks the girls to be bridesmaids for the wedding. Holly and Scott get close and end up having sex in the toilet causing awkwardness for James, and the group are annoyed by Gaz's sudden bond with Scott.
24	2	"The Engagement Party"	13 November 2012	1.005
The group plan an engagement party for Vicky and Ricci but Charlotte is anxious at how her boyfriend will react to meeting everyone. Vicky arranges to set Holly up with a boy at the party but they don't seem to have much in common. After Charlotte's boyfriend gets too drunk, he trashes the place before he's kicked out. Further arguments escalate between Sophie, Vicky and Ricci causing a lot of violence and them being removed from the house the next day. With a few days thinking about everything, Vicky returns as the girls decide to get some fish, Scramble and Egg.
25	3	"Holly's First Date"	20 November 2012	1.069
James confesses to having a girlfriend but doesn't have the heart to tell Holly about it, and Dan is furious with Scott when he keeps taking his girls off him in clubs. Charlotte loses control by getting too drunk and climbs into bed with Gaz, but he climbs straight out knowing that they would both regret it in the morning. The group go on a road trip to Liverpool and Holly is distraught to find out the truth about James. Back in Newcastle, Sophie and Ricci return but there's a lot of tension as Vicky refuses to accept Sophie's apology, and Holly goes on her first date.
26	4	"Just Apologise Sophie"	27 November 2012	0.941
Charlotte meets with her boyfriend to tell him about Gaz but before she has a chance to fully explain herself, he ends the relationship and walks out. James goes all out to impress his new girlfriend Kate, whilst there's still a lot of tension between Sophie and Vicky. Holly sees her date on a night out and gets closer to him, meanwhile Gaz and Charlotte get along better than ever as they spend time together working. Vicky finally approaches Sophie and gives her a chance to fully apologise, and Holly's heartbroken when James introduces Kate to the group.
27	5	"It's All About the B's"	4 December 2012	1.049
Holly's far from impressed when she meets up with her date again and he's over keen, meanwhile Sophie tries to set Dan up with random girls. Ricci gets too drunk and accuses Vicky of flirting with a bouncer which causes a huge argument between the pair. Vicky decides she needs a break from Ricci and he asks for the engagement ring back before packing his bags and leaving the house. Sophie is delighted when Joel comes up to visit her but the group still find it hard to trust him. Charlotte's recent anger comes bubbling to the surface causing her to destroy the house.
28	6	"Hello Dublin"	11 December 2012	1.042
For James' birthday, the group plan a surprise trip to Dublin and secretly invite Kate along. Whilst away, Vicky gets emotional after seeing James and Kate together and realises how much she misses Ricci. Holly strikes an unexpected friendship with Kate, and Scott and Dan clash again over a girl on a night out. Returning home, Vicky is horrified as the other girls visit a sex shop but Gaz is happy to go along with them. Ricci arrives back in the house and announces he's leaving the house for good to save his relationship.
29	7	"The Girls Try Comedy"	18 December 2012	0.935
Vicky's feeling emotional without Ricci but knows him not being in the house is for the best. Gaz puts doubts in Sophie's mind about Joel so she follows him to a club where he's DJing to see if he flirts with girls. As the group go for a camping trip, there's a clear connection between Holly and Scott. Anna arranged for the boys to be auctioned for charity and Dan is bought by a cougar, whereas Holly wastes no time in bidding for Scott. Charlotte gets involved in a bidding war for Gaz and realises that the feelings for him are coming back.
30	8	"An Emotional Ending"	18 December 2012	0.937
After spending days away from Ricci, Vicky finally decides it's time to leave the house so returns home. With false rumours about Sophie cheating being spread, Joel confronts her about it causing a huge argument between the pair. Holly confesses her love for James putting him in an awkward situation, and Dan admits he's finally had enough of feeling left out of the group. As everyone packs their bags to return home, Gaz kisses Charlotte leaving her confused over both his and her own feelings towards each other.

== Ratings ==
Episode	Date	Official MTV rating	MTV weekly rank	Official MTV+1 rating	Total MTV viewers
Episode 1	6 November	932,000	1	43,000	975,000
Episode 2	13 November	941,000	1	64,000	1,005,000
Episode 3	20 November	998,000	1	71,000	1,069,000
Episode 4	27 November	892,000	1	49,000	941,000
Episode 5	4 December	1,012,000	1	37,000	1,049,000
Episode 6	11 December	962,000	1	80,000	1,042,000
Episode 7	18 December	908,000	1	27,000	935,000
Episode 8	18 December	895,000	2	42,000	937,000
