= Geordie Shore series 3 =

Geordie Shore
- Series 3
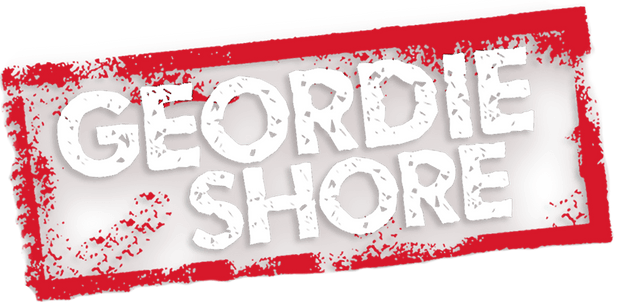
- No. of episodes: 8

Release
- Original network: MTV
- Original release: 26 June – 28 August 2012

Series chronology
- ← Previous; Series 2 Next → Series 4

The third series of Geordie Shore, a British television programme based in Newcastle upon Tyne, began airing on 26 June 2012 on MTV. The series concluded on 28 August 2012 after 8 episodes and 2 specials including a best bits episode and an episode counting down the top 10 moments from the series. This series is also known as Chaos in Cancun as it is the only series to be filmed in Cancún, Mexico, and it is the last series to feature Jay Gardner until his return in series 6 and Rebecca Walker. This series featured Vicky and Ricci's relationship on the rocks before they finally got engaged, Holly and James growing closer when James breaks his leg, and more bickering and flirting between Gaz and Charlotte.

== Cast ==
- Gaz Beadle
- Charlotte-Letitia Crosby
- Holly Hagan
- James Tindale
- Jay Gardner
- Rebecca Walker
- Ricci Guarnaccio
- Sophie Kasaei
- Vicky Pattison

=== Duration of cast ===
Cast members
| Cast members | 1 | 2 | 3 | 4 | 5 | 6 | 7 | 8 |
| Charlotte | | | | | | | | |
| Gaz | | | | | | | | |
| Holly | | | | | | | | |
| James | | | | | | | | |
| Jay | | | | | | | | |
| Rebecca | | | | | | | | |
| Ricci | | | | | | | | |
| Sophie | | | | | | | | |
| Vicky | | | | | | | | |

= Cast member is featured in this episode.
= Cast member voluntarily leaves the house.
= Cast member is removed from the house.
= Cast member returns to the house.
= Cast member leaves the series.
= Cast member features in this episode, but is outside of the house.
= Cast member does not feature in this episode.

== Episodes ==
| No. overall | No. in season | Title | Original release date | Viewers (millions) |
|---|---|---|---|---|
| 15 | 1 | "The Geordies Hit Cancun" | 26 June 2012 | 0.962 |
The cast arrive in Cancun, Mexico and Cancun Chris, their new boss tells them all to look after the house and not to touch his tequila. Jay announces he has a girlfriend, Holly admits she has feelings for James and gets jealous when he tries to pull on a night out, whilst Charlotte turns Gaz down when he tries it on with her. Sophie, who's back with Joel, gets a shock when she hears another girls on the other end of the phone when she phones him. As Charlotte and Rebecca fail to follow Cancun Chris' instructions, they're kicked out the house.
| 16 | 2 | "James' Drought" | 3 July 2012 | 0.875 |
Sophie's paranoia continues when Joel fails to answer his phone numerous times, and she seeks support with the rest of the group. Holly attempts to get James drunk and into bed but it backfires and she ends up getting too drunk herself and trashes the house. Charlotte and Rebecca return to the house, and Charlotte gets emotional of how well her and Gaz are getting on as friends instead of having sex. Vicky and Ricci clash again over an argument about a spilt drink, and their relationship is in turmoil over Vicky's confession.
| 17 | 3 | "Nurse Holly" | 10 July 2012 | 1.021 |
The boys go Mexican wrestling but it all ends in disaster when James breaks his leg, and Holly volunteers to look after him for the rest of the holiday, but she has an ulterior motive. Charlotte and Gaz continue to stay away from each other, but Gaz is the first one to give in and makes a move on her. Joel arrives to surprise Sophie but she isn't impressed when he flirts with other girls in front of her. Ricci and Vicky call a truce and make their feelings towards Joel perfectly clear.
| 18 | 4 | "Vicky and Holly's Task" | 17 July 2012 | 0.819 |
Gaz isn't impressed when Charlotte meets up with Andy on his birthday, and is even more upset when he doesn't pull and Charlotte comes back with Andy. Holly and Vicky go to collect a package for Cancun Chris but are stranded when Vicky drains the car battery. After getting drunk, Vicky leaves to calm down. Holly arrives back to the house alone and Ricci goes looking for a missing Vicky. Sophie still has trust issues with Joel when she sees him flirting again, and Holly finally gets what she wants by having sex with James again.
| 19 | 5 | "The Tequila Trip" | 24 July 2012 | 0.936 |
Ricci and Vicky return to the house and are shocked at Holly's confession. Sophie gets emotional as she says goodbye to Joel before he returns home, and she admits that she'd rather be back in England than in Mexico. Cancun Chris isn't happy when Gaz drinks his tequila, so as punishment he sends Charlotte and Gaz on a long trip to go and get another bottle, but after spending a day looking for the specific bottle, they end up losing it on the journey home. James realises that he's in too deep with Holly so ends their brief fling before feelings start to develop.
| 20 | 6 | "The Argument" | 31 July 2012 | 0.835 |
Jay reveals some home truths to Rebecca causing a rivalry between them, and Gaz and Charlotte clash again in a club. Ricci's not impressed when Vicky throws her bra on stage when Sophie and Holly are doing karaoke, and there's huge arguments between them. Sophie leaves everyone emotional when she reveals she's going home, whereas Ricci announces to Gaz that he'll be proposing to Vicky. On Sophie's last night, Ricci isn't happy when Vicky gets drunk and the pair immediately fall out again, and there's consequences. Sophie returns home to Newcastle.
| 21 | 7 | "Vicky's Having Doubts" | 7 August 2012 | 0.616 |
With Chloe on her way, Jay clears the air with Rebecca to avoid any awkwardness. The group find out that Ricci's still planning to propose to Vicky and Gaz helps him go ring shopping. Meanwhile, Vicky arrives at the house to collect her belongings and tells the girls she's having second thoughts about the relationship. Charlotte accidentally tells Gaz she loves him when they go on a day out together, and Holly and James continue to grow closer. Jay tells Chloe that he'll be leaving Geordie Shore forever but isn't sure how to tell everyone.
| 22 | 8 | "The Big Question" | 14 August 2012 | 0.991 |
Ricci finally proposes to Vicky and she says yes before the pair get a flight back home to Newcastle. Another argument between Gaz and Charlotte erupts and Gaz smashes up the house with anger. James fears that he and Holly will end up like Gaz and Charlotte so ends their brief fling. Jay drops a bombshell on his birthday and tells everyone he will be leaving Geordie Shore for good and everyone gets emotional. Gaz and Charlotte call a final truce and with emotions running high, everyone returns home to Newcastle.

== Ratings ==
| Episode | Date | Official MTV rating | MTV weekly rank | Official MTV+1 rating | Total MTV viewers |
|---|---|---|---|---|---|
| Episode 1 | 26 June 2012 | 840,000 | 1 | 122,000 | 962,000 |
| Episode 2 | 3 July 2012 | 791,000 | 1 | 84,000 | 875,000 |
| Episode 3 | 10 July 2012 | 916,000 | 1 | 105,000 | 1,021,000 |
| Episode 4 | 17 July 2012 | 748,000 | 1 | 71,000 | 819,000 |
| Episode 5 | 24 July 2012 | 834,000 | 1 | 102,000 | 936,000 |
| Episode 6 | 31 July 2012 | 741,000 | 1 | 94,000 | 835,000 |
| Episode 7 | 7 August 2012 | 577,000 | 1 | 90,000 | 616,000 |
| Episode 8 | 14 August 2012 | 878,000 | 1 | 113,000 | 991,000 |
| Best Bits | 21 August 2012 | 381,000 | 1 | 42,000 | 423,000 |
| Top 10 | 28 August 2012 | 135,000 | 1 | 48,000 | 135,000 |
