= Geordie Shore series 5 =

Geordie Shore
- Series 5
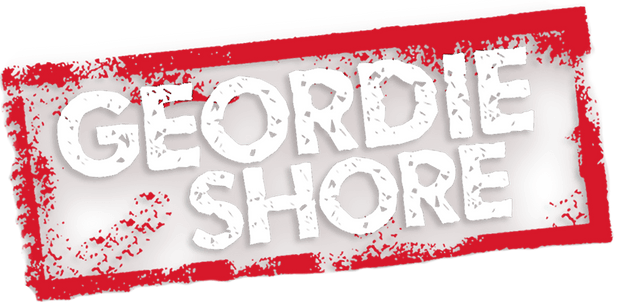
- No. of episodes: 8

Release
- Original network: MTV
- Original release: 19 February – 16 April 2013

Series chronology
- ← Previous; Series 4 Next → Series 6

The fifth series of Geordie Shore, a British television programme based in Newcastle upon Tyne, began airing on 19 February 2013 on MTV. The series concluded on 16 April 2013 after 8 episodes and a special episode counting down the best bits from the series. This series was filmed in Newcastle upon Tyne with the cast visiting various locations around Europe, including Amsterdam, Barcelona, Prague and Tignes. This was the final series to feature cast members Daniel Thomas-Tuck, and Ricci Guarnaccio, who departed the series following the breakdown of his relationship with Vicky Pattison. The series focused heavily on Charlotte finally being honest with Gaz about her feelings towards him, a rift growing between Holly and James following instructions from girlfriend Kate, and the end of Ricci and Vicky's turbulent relationship.

== Cast ==
- Charlotte-Letitia Crosby
- Daniel Thomas-Tuck
- Gary Beadle
- Holly Hagan
- James Tindale
- Ricci Guarnaccio
- Scott Timlin
- Sophie Kasaei
- Vicky Pattison

=== Duration of cast ===
Cast members
Cast members	1	2	3	4	5	6	7	8
Charlotte								
Dan								
Gaz								
Holly								
James								
Ricci								
Scott								
Sophie								
Vicky								

= Cast member is featured in this episode.
= Cast member voluntarily leaves the house.
= Cast member is removed from the house.
= Cast member leaves and returns to the house in the same episode.
= Cast member returns to the house.
= Cast member leaves the series.
= Cast member does not feature in this episode.

== Episodes ==
No. overall	No. in season	Title	Original release date	Viewers (millions)
31	1	"Amsterdam Welcomes the Geordies"	19 February 2013	0.875
As the Geordie Shore cast arrive in the Newcastle house, Anna announces her new Geordie Tours company and sends them all to Amsterdam to lead stag and hen parties. There's an atmosphere as James follows strict instructions from Kate to stay away from Holly. The new Europe boss Sam arrives and sends Gaz and Scott to work, but they love it when they realise they can work whilst getting drunk and pulling girls. The tables turn as Gaz is all over Charlotte but she keeps rejecting him, but after getting far too drunk, she can't resist getting into bed with him.
32	2	"You Will Get Punished Dan"	26 February 2013	0.797
The group return to Newcastle and Charlotte immediately regrets having sex with Gaz. Dan pulls a girl at work leaving Anna angry, and there's consequences for him as he has to clean a mini-bus whilst the others head off go-karting. Ricci and Vicky celebrate their one year anniversary and are delighted to break the Geordie Shore relationship curse. Vicky notices Holly's pain when Kate tells James not to speak to her. It's war between the boys and the girls over who pulls the most, and Charlotte's asked out on a date by Graeme.
33	3	"Here's How to Be a Lady"	5 March 2013	0.862
Charlotte and Holly go on a double date with Graeme and his brother but it doesn't go very successful. As Kate joins the group on a night out, Holly can't help but feel heartbroken and lets out all her emotions to Vicky. Ricci and Vicky clash again after he calls her a name when drunk, and an angry Scott gets into bed with Holly. Charlotte gives into temptation and has sex with Gaz again then tells the girls that she's taking a break from pulling, but promises it's not for Gaz' benefit. Holly and James are put in an awkward situation when they're asked to work together.
34	4	"Let's Take Over Prague"	12 March 2013	0.857
The group head to Prague for the next part of their Geordie Tour but there's clear tension between Charlotte and Gaz. With both Gaz and Charlotte stopping each other from pulling, the pair end up in a heated argument but they're brought back together again when Gaz gets too drunk and tells Charlotte he loves her. Scott and Charlotte decide to leave the group and explore Prague on their own but it turns into a disaster after they stop at an absinthe bar. On a night out, Charlotte's confused over the feelings she has for Gaz and the boys go to the strippers.
35	5	"Old Habits Return"	19 March 2013	0.877
The group return home, and Charlotte and Graeme go on a second date. Vicky and Ricci's turbulent relationship comes to an end after Ricci refuses to let Vicky have a spray tan. Sophie is shocked to hear Kate admitting she's responsible for James ignoring Holly, and encourages them to call a truce. Psycho Charlotte's back as her jealousy increases on a night out causing her to destroy the house and hit Gaz with a lamp. Holly and Scott get carried away in the hot tub and end up in bed again, whilst Dan brings home a cougar.
36	6	"The Boys Get Their International Wings"	26 March 2013	0.902
Charlotte returns to the house and instantly apologises to Gaz for her behaviour, admitting she’s getting increasingly jealous of him getting with other girls. Anna announces the next leg of the Geordie Tours before the group head to Barcelona. Whilst at work, the group see a new side to Vicky when she seems to be enjoying herself mingling with the stags, but Sophie fears that Holly may be falling for Scott. With an atmosphere building, Charlotte drops a bombshell on Gaz by confessing her love for him.
37	7	"House Party Disaster"	2 April 2013	1.017
Charlotte feels like there’s been a weight lifted off her shoulders following her confession to Gaz, but the group can sense a clear atmosphere between them. James’s plans to unite to group with a bootcamp session doesn’t end well as the girls runaway, and Vicky arranges to meet Ricci to end things completely with him. As Ricci enjoys his Geordie Shore send off with the boys, the girls buy another fish for Charlotte. The gang host an American themed house party, but when Charlotte catches Gaz going upstairs with a girl, a huge fight erupts leaving Charlotte injured and Gaz storming out of the house.
38	8	"Apres-Ski"	9 April 2013	1.073
Anna kicks Charlotte out of the house again following her recent behaviour, then sends the remaining housemates to Tignes for the final leg of Geordie Tours. The girls are unable to forgive Gaz for being the main reason for Charlotte’s absence, and Vicky is far from impressed when Joel turns up in France. The boys get even more competitive as they go skiing, but Holly and Dan realise physical activity isn’t good for hangovers. Back in Newcastle, the group head out for one final night out where Vicky is nervous about seeing Ricci, and Gaz makes one last attempt to make things up to Charlotte.

== Ratings ==
Episode	Date	Official MTV rating	MTV weekly rank	Official MTV+1 rating	Total MTV viewers
Episode 1	19 February	787,000	1	88,000	875,000
Episode 2	26 February	728,000	1	69,000	797,000
Episode 3	5 March	767,000	1	95,000	862,000
Episode 4	12 March	759,000	1	98,000	857,000
Episode 5	19 March	815,000	1	89,000	877,000
Episode 6	26 March	775,000	1	102,000	902,000
Episode 7	2 April	930,000	1	87,000	1,017,000
Episode 8	9 April	924,000	1	149,000	1,073,000
Best Bits	16 April	359,000	1	27,000	386,000
