= A Granny's Guide to the Modern World =

British television series

- Presented by: Barry Humphries
- Country of origin: United Kingdom
- No. of series: 1
- No. of episodes: 3

Original release
- Network: Channel 4
- Release: 3 August – 17 August 2016

A Granny's Guide to the Modern World is a three-episode British television series shown on Channel 4 in August 2016. It is presented by Barry Humphries. It follows several elderly male and female investigative reporters as they tackle issues regarding 21st century life in a lighthearted manner.

== Episode 1 ==
- Air date 3 August 2016

Bobby, who's 94, asks ethnic minority people which terms white people should use to refer to them. He discovers that nignog and Paki are not acceptable.

Laura June (82) learns vulgar slang. She tries out her new knowledge on passers-by, but tells a stranger that he looks shit, when she meant to say shit hot.

Helen (91) returns a shirt which has a large stain on it to a shop for a refund. She falsely claims it was like that when she bought it from them.

Margot (73), Trish (82) and Daphne (78) go to a coffee shop in Amsterdam to try cannabis. They also use the swings in a playground.

== Episode 2 ==
- Air date 10 August 2016

Bobby goes to Soho to find out about different types of gays, including bears and otters.

Helen has not had sex since 1971 and has only had sex with her husband. Nevertheless, she's still frisky and is on the hunt for a toyboy.

At a business meeting, a pitch is made for a phone app for casual sex for elderly people, called Greydar.

Margot, Trish and Daphne play shoot 'em up video games.

== Episode 3 ==
- Air date 17 August 2016

Laura June meets Charlotte Crosby.
