= Geordie Shore series 1 =

Geordie Shore
- Series 1
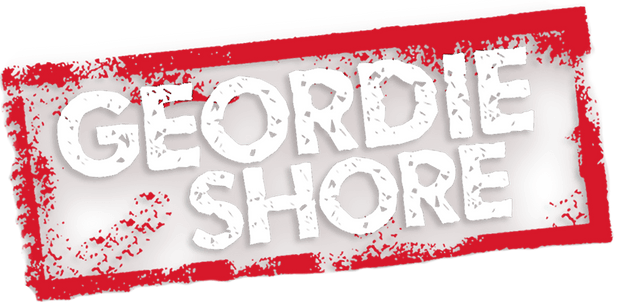
- No. of episodes: 6

Release
- Original network: MTV
- Original release: 24 May – 30 August 2011

Series chronology
- Next → Series 2

The first series of Geordie Shore, a British television programme based in Newcastle upon Tyne, began airing on 24 May 2011 on MTV. The series concluded on 12 July 2011 after 6 episodes and 2 specials including a reunion show hosted by Russell Kane and an episode counting down the best bits of the series. From 23 August 2011 until 30 August 2011, 2 Magaluf specials aired on MTV, however these episodes are featured on the series 2 DVD. The series included the turbulent relationship of Holly (who entered in the house three days late) with Dan coming to an end, the beginning of Gaz and Charlotte's ongoing love/hate relationship, and Jay and Vicky's rocky relationship. This was the only series to feature Greg Lake.

== Cast ==
- Charlotte Crosby
- Gaz Beadle
- Vicky Pattison
- Holly Hagan
- James Tindale
- Jay Gardner
- Sophie Kasaei
- Greg Lake

=== Duration of cast ===
Cast members	Series 1						MM	
Cast members	1	2	3	4	5	6	1	2
Charlotte								
Gaz								
Greg								
Holly								
James								
Jay								
Sophie								
Vicky								

= Cast member is featured in this episode.
= Cast member arrives in the house.
= Cast member voluntarily leaves the house.
= Cast member returns to the house.
= Cast member leaves the series.
= Cast member does not feature in this episode.

== Episodes ==
=== Main series ===
No. overall	No. in season	Title	Original release date	Viewers (millions)
1	1	"Warm Welcome Home"	24 May 2011	0.635
Everyone arrives in the house but Charlotte and Sophie immediately make a bad impression on the others after getting too drunk. Holly causes a stir in the group when she announces she's got a boyfriend, however she ends up in bed with Gaz. Greg considers leaving as he begins to feel left out when he realises he has nothing in common with the other boys. Gaz tries his luck with Charlotte on a night out and she eventually gives into temptation, going back to the house with him. Jay and Vicky get close, and Holly feels like an outsider.
2	2	"A Romantic Meal"	31 May 2011	0.578
Anna's not happy with Jay and James when they fail to turn up to work, and she considers throwing them out of the house. Holly claims she doesn't remember what happened between her and Gaz but confesses to her boyfriend that something may have happened. The boys go behind the girl's back and bring back girls from the previous night which causes a divide in the house. Charlotte begins to fall for Gaz after she sees him with another girl, and Jay and Vicky fall out after seeing each other flirt with other people.
3	3	"Hello Holly's Boyfriend"	7 June 2011	0.650
Charlotte finally gives into temptation and has sex with Gaz, and Vicky and Jay call a truce. Holly gets a shock when her boyfriend turns up, and Gaz is worried in case it causes arguments between them. Vicky accuses Jay of trying to get with another girl but gets the wrong idea, making him kick off in the middle of a club. As they call a truce again, Vicky admits she doesn't want to lead him on. Holly continues to feel left out in the group and makes the decision to leave the house without telling the others.
4	4	"Where Is Holly?"	14 June 2011	0.610
Charlotte gets emotional when she realises that Holly's gone. More arguments between Jay and Vicky give the group something to talk about, and Vicky tries to prove a point to the boys by arranging a treble blind date. After an unsuccessful date, Vicky bitches about the boys in the house to Charlotte and Sophie, but they go straight to Greg and repeat what was said. As Greg then tells the boys, it causes huge conflict and Vicky considers going home. She then turns to Jay for support.
5	5	"Vicky's Not Happy"	21 June 2011	0.691
Vicky considers leaving the house, but when Sophie resolves the current issues, she decides to stay. Greg isn't happy with Vicky's ongoing behaviour and confronts her about it causing them to clash. Charlotte promises to ignore Gaz but can't stay away, and even nurses him when he's ill and unable to go on a night out. Holly returns and doesn't get the response she was expecting, and after numerous arguments with her boyfriend, she confesses being in bed with Gaz on the first night then tells her boyfriend to end the relationship.
6	6	"It's Getting Complicated Vicky"	28 June 2011	0.634
The Jay and Vicky drama continues. An argument between Greg and Holly gets out of control and Holly begins to trash the house before announcing she's leaving again. With her bags packed and ready to go, Jay throws some home truths her way leaving Vicky shocked. Vicky then spits in Jay's face during another argument causing a girl/boy divide again. Charlotte confesses her feelings towards Gaz but is heartbroken when he brings a girl home and into the bed next to her. The group say an emotional goodbye to each other before heading home.

=== Magaluf Specials ===
No. overall	No. in season	Title	Original release date	Viewers (millions)
–	1	"Magaluf Madness: Part 1"	23 August 2011	0.464
As Geordie Shore arrives in Magaluf, they're hit with the news that one person must look after the villa at all times. Holly admits that she used to have feelings for James, whilst Charlotte refuses to admit that Gaz pulling other girls bothers her, and Vicky shocks everyone with her new calm attitude. The girls lie about house sitting and go for a night out, and the boys soon discover their deception causing a huge divide in the house. Charlotte's upset when Gaz calls her ugly during a heated argument.
–	2	"Magaluf Madness: Part 2"	30 August 2011	0.490
Charlotte ends up in bed with Gaz again and immediately realises her mistake and Vicky's there to pick up the pieces as she gets emotional over him. James is put in an awkward situation when he's forced to choose between two girls, but ends up getting neither of them. Charlotte finally stands up to Gaz as the pair get involved in another brutal argument, but then as everyone's packing their bags and get ready to return to Newcastle, he admits he has feelings for her.

== Ratings ==
Episode	Date	Official MTV rating	MTV weekly rank	Official MTV+1 rating	Total MTV viewers
Episode 1	24 May 2011	568,000	1	67,000	635,000
Episode 2	31 May 2011	545,000	1	33,000	578,000
Episode 3	7 June 2011	625,000	1	25,000	650,000
Episode 4	14 June 2011	534,000	1	76,000	610,000
Episode 5	21 June 2011	620,000	1	71,000	691,000
Episode 6	28 June 2011	592,000	1	42,000	634,000
The Reunion	5 July 2011	374,000	1	32,000	406,000
Best Bits	12 July 2011	149,000	1	27,000	176,000
Magaluf Madness: Part One	23 August 2011	346,000	1	118,000	464,000
Magaluf Madness: Part Two	30 August 2011	414,000	1	76,000	490,000
