= Geordie Shore series 6 =

Geordie Shore
- Series 6
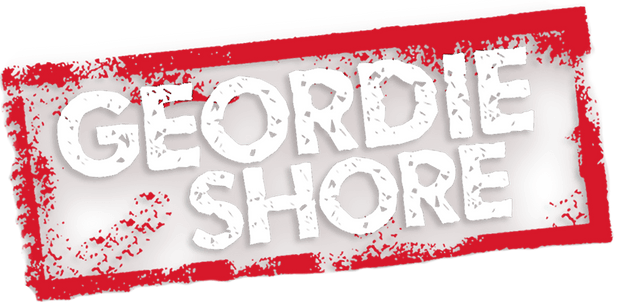
- No. of episodes: 8

Release
- Original network: MTV
- Original release: 9 July – 27 August 2013

Series chronology
- ← Previous; Series 5 Next → Series 7

The sixth series of Geordie Shore, a British television programme based in Newcastle upon Tyne, began airing on 9 July 2013, and concluded after 8 episodes concluding on 27 August 2013. Filming began for this series in April 2013 and concluded in May. This series was the first to be filmed in Australia. Former cast member Jay Gardner returned as a guest, who had originally appeared in the show from series one to three. This series focused heavily on Gaz and Scott being isolated from the group after putting getting with girls before the rest of the group, leading to a fight with James, Charlotte feeling homesick and considering leaving the series for her boyfriend Mitch, and a new blossoming romance between Vicky and Dan Conn.

== Cast ==
- Charlotte-Letitia Crosby
- Gary Beadle
- Holly Hagan
- James Tindale
- Jay Gardner
- Scott Timlin
- Sophie Kasaei
- Vicky Pattison

=== Duration of cast ===
Cast members
Cast members	1	2	3	4	5	6	7	8
Charlotte								
Gaz								
Holly								
James								
Jay								
Scott								
Sophie								
Vicky								

= Cast member is featured in this episode.
= Cast member voluntarily leaves the house.
= Cast member is removed from the house.
= Cast member leaves and returns to the house in the same episode.
= Cast member returns to the house.
= Cast member features in this episode, but is outside of the house.
= Cast member returns to the series.
= Cast member leaves the series.

== Episodes ==
No. overall	No. in season	Title	Original release date	Viewers (millions)
39	1	"The Gang Go Down Under"	9 July 2013	1.108
The group arrive in Sydney without Charlotte or Scott. James and Holly try to call a truce but end up fighting again. Scott arrives and everyone notices a sudden change in Gaz. An emotional James confides in Vicky about not fitting in with Gaz and Scott. Holly loses her temper with James, leading to her being thrown out the house, and Charlotte arrives but avoids Gaz. With James enjoying himself more on a night out without Holly, Charlotte stays in and is delighted when a familiar face returns to Geordie Shore, Jay!
40	2	"Family Means Family"	16 July 2013	1.133
Holly returns and clashes with Scott over the bed situation causing him to wreck the house. Steve the Shearer isn't impressed with his actions and decides to punish him. Jay spends his birthday in the house before returning home leaving James upset. Vicky goes on her first date since breaking up with Ricci, whilst Charlotte tries to prove that she's not boring despite respecting her boyfriend back at home and not pulling. The girls rage at Scott as he attempts to get a girl on family night, and James attempts to call a truce with Holly.
41	3	"House Divides"	23 July 2013	1.099
With Gaz and Scott continuing to cause annoyance in the house by going out pulling, James and the girls stand up to them and tell them they're not wanted. James is removed from the house for his behaviour, whilst Gaz and Scott decide to take a break. In an all girls house, Sophie tells Charlotte that Joel will be arriving soon leaving her jealous. When the boys return, James and Holly finally set aside their differences and make friends again. The singles decide to have a family night which leads to Holly and Scott having sex, and Gaz and Vicky getting flirty.
42	4	"Vicky Meets Dan"	30 July 2013	1.043
Joel arrives for Sophie, and there's clear jealousy between James and Charlotte. The boys arrange for Dan, an Australian personal trainer to put the girls through their paces but Vicky's overwhelmed with feelings for him. Scott and Gaz clash over how many girls each other have pulled causing another divide in the group. James arranges for Kate to come to Australia but away from the group. As James departs, Charlotte also considers leaving for good. On a day out with Dan, Vicky tries her best to impress him, and Steve sends some of the group to The Outback.
43	5	"Anger Management"	6 August 2013	1.013
Still in the Outback, Charlotte decides that's she'll be staying in the house rather than going home. Meanwhile, Sophie, Scott and Joel visit a nudist beach. An anger management session is arranged for the group, and Charlotte lets out all her negative feelings towards Gaz. Scott and Gaz go skydiving for Scott's birthday, then Gaz finds out he needs to go to work with Charlotte. James returns to the house after spending a week with Kate but is anxious of how Scott and Gaz will be around him. Sophie and Joel get too drunk and embarrass the group on a night out.
44	6	"The Haunted House"	13 August 2013	1.006
As Charlotte goes crazy and wrecks the house, Holly also finds herself getting angry with Scott causing all three of them to be kicked out of the house by Steve. As further punishment, Sophie, Gaz, Vicky and James are sent to the most haunted house in Australia. Returning to the house, it's clear that Vicky's making the most of her single life. Charlotte arrives back early but Steve sends Scott and Holly on an errand for him, but both end up drunk and get into bed with each other. Dan surprises Vicky by turning up to the house.
45	7	"The Pie Shop Argument"	20 August 2013	0.941
Holly and Scott return to the house and confess to their bedroom antics whilst Gaz secretly plans a trip away for the singles in the house. After a big night out, Vicky clashes with Gaz which angers James. When Gaz says he'll get Vicky kicked out of the house, James punches him. However it backfires and James is removed from the house by Steve. Not letting the recent events ruin their trip, the singles still go to Australian paradise where Gaz and Vicky call a truce. Scott's ongoing mission to pull random girls continues to anger Holly.
46	8	"Goodbye Australia"	27 August 2013	0.963
The singles return from their trip to find out that James has been removed from the house, and Steve isn't impressed with Gaz after the girls all lie about the fight and claim Gaz instigated it. Left with no choice, Steve kicks Gaz out the house and makes him stay with James. Vicky gets emotional at the thought of going home and meets up with Dan one last time. Gaz leaves Charlotte a note explaining his feelings towards her but she refuses to read it. One by one they all say goodbye to each other before returning to Newcastle but Gaz returns to give Charlotte a special send-off.

== Ratings ==
Episode	Date	Official MTV rating	MTV weekly rank	Official MTV+1 rating	Total MTV viewers
Episode 1	9 July	1,006,000	1	102,000	1,108,000
Episode 2	16 July	1,019,000	1	114,000	1,133,000
Episode 3	23 July	961,000	1	138,000	1,099,000
Episode 4	30 July	907,000	1	136,000	1,043,000
Episode 5	6 August	912,000	1	101,000	1,013,000
Episode 6	13 August	872,000	1	134,000	1,006,000
Episode 7	20 August	851,000	1	90,000	941,000
Episode 8	27 August	866,000	1	97,000	963,000
