= Ex on the Beach Sweden =

- Genre: Reality
- Country of origin: Sweden
- Original language: Swedish
- No. of series: 9; 1(spin-off)
- No. of episodes: 192

Original release
- Network: Kanal 5 Discovery+
- Release: 16 April 2015 – 11 January 2021

Ex on the Beach Sweden (Ex on the Beach Sverige) started airing on Kanal 11 on 6 April 2015 and is the Swedish version of the British show Ex on the Beach.

== Production ==
Season two started airing on Kanal 5 on 28 March 2016. Seven more seasons were broadcast, also via streaming on Discovery+.

On February 22, 2021, Celebrity Ex on the Beach: Peak of Love (a spin-off of the American version) premiered, featuring several notable contestants in the show's history. In this version, the singles leave their exes on the beach and head to Åre. They move to a winter wonderland while they wait for singles who want to meet them and ask them out. On May 5, all episodes were removed from the streaming page where they were posted after the show was cancelled.

=== Cancellation ===
On May 4, 2021, Discovery Networks announced that the next season was canceled. Recordings were scheduled for September and a casting process was underway to find participants. This after the production of Paradise Hotel Sweden chose to stop the season that was in development, due to complaints from two female participants of sexual abuse within the production of said program. The 16 episodes of Paradise Hotel were eliminated from the streaming page Viaplay. The planned recording of Ex on the Beach was later cancelled.
