= List of Ex on the Beach episodes =

The following is a list of episodes for the a British reality television series, Ex on the Beach that first aired on MTV on 22 April 2014.

== Series overview ==
Series	Episodes	Originally released		Location	Average viewership
Series	Episodes	First released	Last released	Location	Average viewership
1	8	22 April 2014	10 June 2014	Marbella, Spain	764,000
2	8	27 January 2015	17 March 2015	TBA	712,000
3	10	11 August 2015	13 October 2015	Cancun, Mexico	777,000
4	8	19 January 2016	8 March 2016	Algarve, Portugal	896,000
5	10	16 August 2016	18 October 2016	Koh Samui, Thailand	800,000
6	10	17 January 2017	21 March 2017	Crete, Greece	805,000
7	10	20 June 2017	22 August 2017	Bali, Indonesia	525,000
8	8	20 March 2018	8 May 2018	Marbella, Spain	484,000
9	12	15 August 2018	31 October 2018	Tulum, Mexico	257,000
10	—N/a	Unaired		—N/a	—N/a
11	10	9 May 2023	11 July 2023	Gran Canaria, Spain	—N/a

== Episodes ==
=== Series 1 (2014) ===
No. overall	No. in season	Title	Original release date	Duration	UK viewers
1	1	"Episode 1"	22 April 2014	60 minutes	759,000
2	2	"Episode 2"	29 April 2014	60 minutes	706,000
3	3	"Episode 3"	6 May 2014	60 minutes	749,000
4	4	"Episode 4"	13 May 2014	60 minutes	722,000
5	5	"Episode 5"	20 May 2014	60 minutes	745,000
6	6	"Episode 6"	27 May 2014	60 minutes	789,000
7	7	"Episode 7"	3 June 2014	60 minutes	841,000
8	8	"Episode 8"	10 June 2014	60 minutes	802,000

=== Series 2 (2015) ===
No. overall	No. in season	Title	Original release date	Duration	UK viewers
9	1	"Episode 1"	27 January 2015	60 minutes	451,000
10	2	"Episode 2"	3 February 2015	60 minutes	570,000
11	3	"Episode 3"	10 February 2015	60 minutes	661,000
12	4	"Episode 4"	17 February 2015	60 minutes	839,000
13	5	"Episode 5"	24 February 2015	60 minutes	747,000
14	6	"Episode 6"	3 March 2015	60 minutes	927,000
15	7	"Episode 7"	10 March 2015	60 minutes	710,000
16	8	"Episode 8"	17 March 2015	60 minutes	791,000

=== Series 3 (2015) ===
No. overall	No. in season	Title	Original release date	Duration	UK viewers
17	1	"Episode 1"	11 August 2015	60 minutes	751,000
18	2	"Episode 2"	18 August 2015	60 minutes	861,000
19	3	"Episode 3"	25 August 2015	60 minutes	719,000
20	4	"Episode 4"	1 September 2015	60 minutes	831,000
21	5	"Episode 5"	8 September 2015	60 minutes	821,000
22	6	"Episode 6"	15 September 2015	60 minutes	769,000
23	7	"Episode 7"	22 September 2015	60 minutes	796,000
24	8	"Episode 8"	29 September 2015	60 minutes	713,000
25	9	"Episode 9"	6 October 2015	60 minutes	767,000
26	10	"Episode 10"	13 October 2015	60 minutes	743,000

=== Series 4 (2016) ===
No. overall	No. in season	Title	Original release date	Duration	UK viewers
27	1	"Episode 1"	19 January 2016	60 minutes	822,000
28	2	"Episode 2"	26 January 2016	60 minutes	805,000
29	3	"Episode 3"	2 February 2016	60 minutes	725,000
30	4	"Episode 4"	9 February 2016	60 minutes	819,000
31	5	"Episode 5"	16 February 2016	60 minutes	979,000
32	6	"Episode 6"	23 February 2016	60 minutes	1,102,000
33	7	"Episode 7"	1 March 2016	60 minutes	995,000
34	8	"Episode 8"	8 March 2016	60 minutes	918,000

=== Series 5 (2016) ===
No. overall	No. in season	Title	Original release date	Duration	UK viewers
35	1	"Episode 1"	16 August 2016	60 minutes	851,000
36	2	"Episode 2"	23 August 2016	60 minutes	839,000
37	3	"Episode 3"	30 August 2016	60 minutes	850,000
38	4	"Episode 4"	6 September 2016	60 minutes	800,000
39	5	"Episode 5"	13 September 2016	60 minutes	846,000
40	6	"Episode 6"	20 September 2016	60 minutes	713,000
41	7	"Episode 7"	27 September 2016	60 minutes	728,000
42	8	"Episode 8"	4 October 2016	60 minutes	772,000
43	9	"Episode 9"	11 October 2016	60 minutes	843,000
44	10	"Episode 10"	18 October 2016	60 minutes	753,000

=== Series 6 (2017) ===
No. overall	No. in season	Title	Original release date	Duration	UK viewers
45	1	"Episode 1"	17 January 2017	60 minutes	730,000
46	2	"Episode 2"	24 January 2017	60 minutes	758,000
47	3	"Episode 3"	31 January 2017	60 minutes	765,000
48	4	"Episode 4"	7 February 2017	60 minutes	804,000
49	5	"Episode 5"	14 February 2017	60 minutes	820,000
50	6	"Episode 6"	21 February 2017	60 minutes	798,000
51	7	"Episode 7"	28 February 2017	60 minutes	799,000
52	8	"Episode 8"	7 March 2017	60 minutes	916,000
53	9	"Episode 9"	14 March 2017	60 minutes	890,000
54	10	"Episode 10"	21 March 2017	60 minutes	765,000

=== Series 7 (2017) ===
No. overall	No. in season	Title	Original release date	Duration	UK viewers
55	1	"Episode 1"	20 June 2017	60 minutes	606,000
56	2	"Episode 2"	27 June 2017	60 minutes	549,000
57	3	"Episode 3"	4 July 2017	60 minutes	532,000
58	4	"Episode 4"	11 July 2017	60 minutes	584,000
59	5	"Episode 5"	18 July 2017	60 minutes	489,000
60	6	"Episode 6"	25 July 2017	60 minutes	565,000
61	7	"Episode 7"	1 August 2017	60 minutes	516,000
62	8	"Episode 8"	8 August 2017	60 minutes	469,000
63	9	"Episode 9"	15 August 2017	60 minutes	Unknown
64	10	"Episode 10"	22 August 2017	60 minutes	414,000

=== Series 8 (2018) ===
No. overall	No. in season	Title	Original release date	Duration	UK viewers
65	1	"Episode 1"	20 March 2018	60 minutes	525,000
66	2	"Episode 2"	27 March 2018	60 minutes	408,000
67	3	"Episode 3"	3 April 2018	60 minutes	429,000
68	4	"Episode 4"	10 April 2018	60 minutes	464,000
69	5	"Episode 5"	17 April 2018	60 minutes	488,000
70	6	"Episode 6"	24 April 2018	60 minutes	504,000
71	7	"Episode 7"	1 May 2018	60 minutes	546,000
72	8	"Episode 8"	8 May 2018	60 minutes	505,000

=== Series 9 (2018) ===
No. overall	No. in season	Title	Original release date	Duration	UK viewers
73	1	"Episode 1"	15 August 2018	60 minutes	211,000
74	2	"Episode 2"	22 August 2018	60 minutes	180,000
75	3	"Episode 3"	29 August 2018	60 minutes	206,200
76	4	"Episode 4"	5 September 2018	60 minutes	238,100
77	5	"Episode 5"	12 September 2018	60 minutes	262,100
78	6	"Episode 6"	19 September 2018	60 minutes	315,100
79	7	"Episode 7"	26 September 2018	60 minutes	253,000
80	8	"Episode 8"	3 October 2018	60 minutes	326,100
81	9	"Episode 9"	10 October 2018	60 minutes	290,400
82	10	"Episode 10"	17 October 2018	60 minutes	261,100
83	11	"Episode 11"	24 October 2018	60 minutes	285,500
84	12	"Episode 12"	31 October 2018	60 minutes	260,200

=== Series 10 (unaired) ===
The tenth series of Ex on the Beach was set to air in early 2019, but the broadcast was cancelled after the death of Mike Thalassitis, a cast member featured on the series.

=== Series 11 (2023) ===
No. overall	No. in season	Title	Original release date	Duration
85	1	"Episode 1"	9 May 2023	60 minutes
86	2	"Episode 2"	16 May 2023	60 minutes
87	3	"Episode 3"	23 May 2023	60 minutes
88	4	"Episode 4"	30 May 2023	60 minutes
89	5	"Episode 5"	6 June 2023	60 minutes
90	6	"Episode 6"	13 June 2023	60 minutes
91	7	"Episode 7"	20 June 2023	60 minutes
92	8	"Episode 8"	27 June 2023	60 minutes
93	9	"Episode 9"	4 July 2023	60 minutes
94	10	"Episode 10"	11 July 2023	60 minutes
