= Geordie Shore series 2 =

Geordie Shore
- Series 2
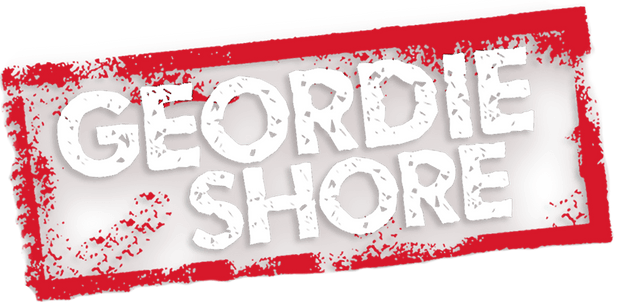
- No. of episodes: 8

Release
- Original network: MTV
- Original release: 31 January – 3 April 2012

Series chronology
- ← Previous; Series 1 Next → Series 3

The second series of Geordie Shore, a British television programme based in Newcastle upon Tyne, began airing on 31 January 2012 on MTV. The series concluded on 3 April 2012 after 8 episodes and 2 specials including a reunion show presented by Russell Kane and an episode counting down the best bits of the series. This was the first series to feature Rebecca Walker and Ricci Guarnaccio. The series featured Sophie and Joel's rocky relationship coming to an end, Vicky being torn between her boyfriend Dan and new cast member Ricci, Charlotte admitting she's finally had enough of seeing Gaz with other girls, and the beginning of Holly and James.

== Cast ==
- Gaz Beadle
- Charlotte-Letitia Crosby
- Holly Hagan
- James Tindale
- Jay Gardner
- Vicky Pattison
- Sophie Kasaei
- Ricci Guarnaccio
- Rebecca Walker

=== Duration of Cast ===
Cast members
Cast members	1	2	3	4	5	6	7	8
Charlotte								
Gaz								
Holly								
James								
Jay								
Rebecca								
Ricci								
Sophie								
Vicky								

= Cast member is featured in this episode.
= Cast member arrives in the house.
= Cast member voluntarily leaves the house.
= Cast member is removed from the house.
= Cast member returns to the house.
= Cast member does not feature in this episode.

== Episodes ==
No. overall	No. in season	Title	Original release date	Viewers (millions)
7	1	"New Additions"	31 January 2012	0.499
The cast return to the house again and Charlotte promises to stay away from Gaz for good, meanwhile Sophie and Vicky announce they have boyfriends outside of the house. The celebrations are soon interrupted as Rebecca and Ricci arrive in the house. Vicky and Rebecca immediately clash. Charlotte can't help herself and ends up with Gaz, then isn't surprised when he's with another girl the next night. Jay and Rebecca start to get close, Vicky feels guilty for cuddling with Ricci, and Holly tries her luck with James.
8	2	"You Can't Help Your Feelings"	7 February 2012	0.576
Vicky's still torn between Ricci and her boyfriend, Dan. Rebecca's jealous when Jay gets involved with his ex-girlfriend, Amanda. Charlotte admits she's had enough of being hurt by Gaz so packs her bags and leaves the house, and the girls don't take the news well. Holly's still on a mission to get James into bed but he's having none of it. Jay finds Rebecca on Gaz's bed and accuses them of getting together, the argument soon turns to a fight and Sophie's there to break it up.
9	3	"James Needs to Score"	14 February 2012	0.538
Following arguments with Gaz and Holly, Vicky finally realises that she's hurting Dan by getting close to Ricci. Things get worse however when Dan arrives at the house and gets pally with Ricci. Holly's depressed when Rebecca sets James up with one of her friends and they end up spending the night together. Jay loses his temper with Rebecca when she refuses to have sex with him, and a drunk Ricci angers her by calling her unnecessary names. Sophie's not impressed when her boyfriend doesn't make an effort.
10	4	"We Miss You Charlotte"	21 February 2012	0.596
Vicky attempts to end the relationship with Dan but is surprised when he fights for her, then returns to the house to tell Ricci that they're still together. Gaz brings Charlotte back to the house and even suggests starting a relationship. Charlotte gives into temptation again and ends up having sex with him 3 nights in a row. Holly finally gets what she wants and has sex with James, but is upset when he forces Rebecca to swap rooms with him the next day. Jay's not happy with Rebecca as she still refuses to have sex with him.
11	5	"The Party Is Ruined"	28 February 2012	0.652
Sophie's boyfriend, Joel arrives to see her but makes more of an effort to be around the boys and flirt with other girls than be with Sophie. Finally giving up, Sophie ends the relationship with Joel. Vicky plans to finish Dan but is heartbroken when he doesn't turn up. Ricci treats Vicky on her birthday making Charlotte jealous of Gaz not being as nice. With a house party in full swing, Ricci gets too drunk and announces on the DJ's tannoy that he's Vicky's new boyfriend and then has run-ins with James and Lucy, then fights with Gaz.
12	6	"The Girls Go to Far"	6 March 2012	0.686
Anna throws Gaz and Ricci out of the house. After agreeing to meet up with Joel, Sophie takes him back and they give their relationship another go. However Vicky starts an argument with Joel over the way he's been treating Sophie recently. The girls go to see a psychic and Charlotte's upset to hear that it's true love between her and Gaz. On a girls trip to Leeds, Rebecca feels left out and cries to Holly. Vicky stands her ground however and feels that Rebecca isn't being herself and is trying to impress everyone by being fake.
13	7	"The Truth Is Revealed"	13 March 2012	0.679
Gaz and Ricci return. Vicky tries to make Rebecca feel more involved in the group after finding out she spent the night crying. Returning home from Leeds to find flowers from Dan, Vicky admits she's had enough but then he ignores her when she spots him on a night out. When the boys go to the strippers, Vicky's not happy about the idea of Ricci going so he stays in the house. With the girls expecting the boys to bring the strippers back to the house, they sabotage the hot tub and their rooms. There's consequences though when they come back alone.
14	8	"We Are Family After All"	20 March 2012	0.711
The group are brought back together as they all decide to call a truce. Ricci and Vicky rekindle their relationship leaving the boys confused. Charlotte and Gaz discuss their friendship and think they'll be married in the next 10 years. For the last night, they all have a party and James finally gives into Holly and they have sex again. Rebecca decides to resolve her differences with Vicky but she doesn't want to know. Sophie spots Joel flirting with a girl in front of her so finishes him again and tells him to go. Everyone says an emotional goodbye before returning home.

== Ratings ==
Episode	Date	Official MTV rating	MTV weekly rank	Official MTV+1 rating	Total MTV viewers
Episode 1	31 January 2012	462,000	1	37,000	499,000
Episode 2	7 February 2012	529,000	1	47,000	576,000
Episode 3	14 February 2012	493,000	1	45,000	538,000
Episode 4	21 February 2012	536,000	1	60,000	596,000
Episode 5	28 February 2012	606,000	1	46,000	652,000
Episode 6	6 March 2012	640,000	1	46,000	686,000
Episode 7	13 March 2012	638,000	1	41,000	679,000
Episode 8	20 March 2012	653,000	1	58,000	711,000
The Reunion	27 March 2012	239,000	1	65,000	304,000
Best Bits	3 April 2012				
