= Geordie Shore OGs =

- Genre: Reality
- Created by: MTV
- Starring: Aaron Chalmers; Gaz Beadle; Holly Hagan; Marnie Simpson; Sophie Kasaei
- Country of origin: United Kingdom
- Original language: English
- No. of series: 4
- No. of episodes: 32

Production
- Running time: 42-43 minutes (excluding adverts)
- Production company: Lime Pictures

Original release
- Network: MTV
- Release: 14 August 2019 – 14 September 2021

Related
- Geordie Shore

Geordie Shore OGs is a British reality television series broadcast on MTV UK developed as a sequel to Geordie Shore. The series reunited the original cast members, alongside their children, friends, and new faces, and followed their personal and professional lives. It premiered on 14 August 2019. MTV renewed the series for a fourth and final season which premiered on 13 July 2021.

== Production ==
In May 2019, MTV confirmed a new Geordie Shore spin-off, featuring former cast members. Craig Orr, VP of commissioning and development at MTV International, said: "We're really excited to reunite viewers with some of the most influential and most loved cast members. We can't wait to show how life has changed for this lot since leaving the Geordie house and catch up with them as they continue to navigate their way into adulthood."

The first season premiered on 14 August 2019. It featured Aaron Chalmers, Gaz Beadle, Holly Hagan, and Marnie Simpson. Production took place in Bedfordshire, Leeds, London, Newcastle and Newport.

The second season premiered on 26 February 2020 and focused on Marnie's pregnancies, Gaz's girlfriend, and Aaron's professional career in MMA. Sophie Kasaei, who had a recurring role in the first season, then became a full-time cast member in 2020.

The third season premiered on 28 October 2020. Gaz Beadle and Sophie Kasaei did not return to the show after the previous season. Featured Aaron and Tahlia trying to save their relationship when they welcomed a new baby, Marnie's health issues, and Holly's wedding plans.

In June 2021, the fourth season was announced and premiered on 13 July 2021. It featured Marnie and Casey facilitating their on-off relationship. Sophie also returns to the show as she develops as an entrepreneur. Holly grapples with the ups and downs of her upcoming nuptials due to the coronavirus pandemic, while Aaron and his girlfriend Tahlia face challenges after the troubled birth of her second child.

=== Cast ===
Main Cast member	Seasons			
Main Cast member	1	2	3	4
Gaz Beadle	Main			
Aaron Chalmers	Main			
Holly Hagan	Main			
Marnie Simpson	Main			
Sophie Kasaei	Recurring	Main	Guest	Main
Recurrent cast member
Jacob Blyth	Recurring			
Casey Johnson	Recurring			
Craig Johnson-Pass	Recurring	Guest		
Sharon Kenney	Recurring	Guest		
Emma McVey	Recurring			
Tahlia Oatway	Recurring			
Tom Chanalled		Guest	Recurring	Guest
Nathan Henry	Guest		Recurring	Guest
Guest cast member
Charlotte Crosby	Guest			
Chloe Ferry	Guest			
Sam Gowland	Guest			
Zahida Allen			Guest	
Charlotte Dawson				Guest
Lateysha Grace				Guest

== Episodes ==
=== Series overview ===
Series	Episodes	Originally released	
Series	Episodes	First released	Last released
1	6	14 August 2019	18 September 2019
2	8	26 February 2020	15 April 2020
3	8	28 October 2020	16 December 2020
4	10	13 July 2021	14 September 2021

=== Season 1 (2019) ===
No. overall	No. in season	Title	Original release date
1	1	"Back - With a Bump"	14 August 2019
Aaron misses his train to a press conference announcing his big MMA fight, Holly gets an old tattoo removed, Marnie has her first scan, and Gary invites Aaron to meet baby Chester.
2	2	"From Radgie to Riches"	21 August 2019
Marnie and Casey do a photo shoot. Holly takes a class in public speaking and it's date night for Gary and Emma. The stress of Aaron's upcoming fight is beginning to show.
3	3	"It's a Family Affair..."	28 August 2019
Marnie gives Casey a sexy birthday present. Holly faces her fears at Sussex Uni. Aaron meets up with Nathan and Sam to talk about mental health. Emma has a big surprise for Gary.
4	4	"Strike a Pose"	4 September 2019
Marnie shows off her baby bump in a magazine shoot. Gary plays golf with Chris Hughes. Aaron's shocked to find out who his opponent is in his MMA fight and Holly says goodbye.
5	5	"for the Drama"	11 September 2019
Gary and Emma share some special news and Aaron gets stuck into training. Holly goes to the House of Lords and a photo of Casey is sent to a newspaper.
6	6	"Fight Night"	18 September 2019
Holly gives the low-down on Jacob's surprise proposal. Marnie and Casey reveal the gender of their baby. And, Aaron finally takes to the cage for his comeback MMA fight at Wembley

=== Season 2 (2020) ===
No. overall	No. in season	Title	Original release date
7	1	"Baby Ready"	25 February 2020
8	2	"Labour Party"	4 March 2020
9	3	"Gary Pops the Question"	11 March 2020
10	4	"Dad School"	18 March 2020
11	5	"Unicorn Drawn Carriage"	25 March 2020
12	6	"Date Night"	1 April 2020
13	7	"Troll Hunter"	1 April 2020
14	8	"Fight Night"	15 April 2020

=== Season 3 (2020) ===
No. overall	No. in season	Title	Original release date
15	1	"Wherefore Art Thou Romeo?"	28 October 2020
16	2	"I’m Sexy and I Know It"	4 November 2020
17	3	"Always the Bridesmaids"	11 November 2020
18	4	"Pickled Onion Proposal"	18 November 2020
19	5	"I Think I Wanna Marry You"	25 November 2020
20	6	"Hats Off to Holly"	2 December 2020
21	7	"How Many Holly’s?"	9 December 2020
22	8	"Back Where It All Began"	16 December 2020

=== Season 4 (2021) ===
No. overall	No. in season	Title	Original release date
23	1	"Geordie Drama"	13 July 2021
24	2	"Big Life Goals"	20 July 2021
25	3	"Self-Discovery"	27 July 2021
26	4	"Outside Influences"	3 August 2021
27	5	"This Is Me!"	10 August 2021
28	6	"Keeping It Real!"	17 August 2021
29	7	"Life in the Balance"	24 August 2021
30	8	"Welcome to the World"	31 August 2021
31	9	"Bouncing Back"	7 September 2021
32	10	"The Future’s Bright"	14 September 2021
