= Ex on the Beach (British TV series) =

British reality television series

- Genre: Reality
- Created by: MTV UK
- Starring: Full list
- Narrated by: Andrew Maxwell
- Country of origin: United Kingdom
- Original language: English
- No. of series: 10 (1 unaired)
- No. of episodes: 94 (list of episodes)

Production
- Production company: Whizz Kid Entertainment (eOne)

Original release
- Network: MTV UK
- Release: 22 April 2014 – 11 July 2023

Related
- Celebrity Ex on the Beach

Ex on the Beach is a British reality television series that was broadcast on MTV UK. The series was first announced in February 2014 and premiered on 22 April 2014. Ex on the Beach follows the format of cast members staying abroad and beginning relationships, which are typically interrupted by their exes arriving at various points throughout the series. The series is narrated by Andrew Maxwell. Since its origin in the United Kingdom, numerous international versions have aired. Since 2020, celebrity versions of the series have also aired.

== History ==
The first series of Ex on the Beach was announced in February 2014 and premiered on MTV on 22 April 2014. It was narrated by Andrew Maxwell, who has remained in the role since. Ex on the Beach follows the format of cast members staying abroad and beginning relationships, which are typically interrupted by their exes arriving at various points throughout the series.

Since its origin in the United Kingdom, various international versions, spin-offs and a celebrity version of the series have spawned. Numerous cast members have gone on to achieve varying degrees of success following their appearances on the series. Examples include Kayleigh Morris, who went on to appear in the eighteenth series of Big Brother in 2017, but was removed from the house on Day 13 due to threatening behaviour, Megan McKenna, who has appeared on numerous television series and has gone on to release original music and Stephen Bear, who won the eighteenth series of Celebrity Big Brother but went on to be jailed for voyeurism and disclosure of private sexual photographs.

On 20 March 2019, it was confirmed that transmission of the tenth series had been cancelled following the suicide of cast member Mike Thalassitis. Producers decided not to air any of the episodes from the series, and did not reveal the rest of the cast members involved in the series. One more series of Ex on the Beach aired following the incident, with celebrity versions of the series assuming their place.

== Series overview ==
Year	Series	Location	Number of episodes	Average viewers
2014	1	Marbella, Spain	8	764,000
2015	2	Marbella, Spain	8	712,000
2015	3	Cancun, Mexico	10	777,000
2016	4	Algarve, Portugal	8	896,000
2016	5	Koh Samui, Thailand	10	800,000
2017	6	Crete, Greece	10	805,000
2017	7	Bali, Indonesia	10	525,000
2018	8	Marbella, Spain	8	484,000
2018	9	Tulum, Mexico	12	257,000
2019	10	Unaired		
2023	11	Gran Canaria	10	–

=== Series 1 (2014) ===
The first series of the show was announced in February 2014 and premiered on MTV on 22 April 2014. The series ran for eight episodes and concluded on 10 June 2014. The list of cast members was released on 13 March 2014 and included four single men: Ashley Cain, Jack Lomax, Liam Lewis and Marco Alexandre; as well as four single women: Chloe Goodman, Emily Gillard, Farah Sattaur and Vicky Pattison. Geordie Shore star Vicky Pattison was joined by ex-fiancé and former Geordie Shore co-star Ricci Guarnaccio, as well as Australian fling Daniel Conn who featured briefly in series 6 of Geordie Shore.

=== Series 2 (2015) ===
The second series of the show began airing on 27 January 2015 and ran for eight episodes, concluding on 17 March 2015. This was confirmed on 23 July 2014 when it was announced that filming would begin shortly after, with the series airing in 2015. The list of cast members was released on 6 January 2015. It included four single men: Connor Hunter, Luke Goodfellow, Morgan Evans and Rogan O'Connor, as well as four single women: Anita Kaushik, Kayleigh Morris, Loren Green and Melissa Reeves. It was also announced that Geordie Shore stars Charlotte Crosby and Gary Beadle would also be taking part in the series.

Ahead of the launch of the new series, it was confirmed that series 1 cast member Ashley Cain would be returning for the second series as an ex.

=== Series 3 (2015) ===
The third series of the show began airing on 11 August 2015. This series was filmed in Cancun, Mexico. The list of cast members was released on 14 July 2015. It included four men: Graham Griffiths, Jayden Robins, Kirk Norcross and Stephen Bear, and four women: Amy Paige Cooke, Laura Alicia Summers, Megan McKenna and Megan Rees. With the announcement of the line-up, it was confirmed that series 1 cast member Vicky Pattison would be making her return as an ex alongside series 2 star Rogan O'Connor. The Only Way Is Essex cast member Kirk Norcross was also confirmed to be taking part in the series, with his ex-fiancée and Celebrity Big Brother star Cami-Li featuring as his ex. Star of Magaluf Weekender Jordan Davies was also announced to be taking part in the series, featuring as an ex.

=== Series 4 (2016) ===
The fourth series of the show began airing on 19 January 2016. This series was filmed in Portugal. The cast list was revealed on 15 December 2015 and included four women: Helen Briggs, Nancy-May Turner, Naomi Hedman and Olivia Walsh, as well as four men: Joe Delaney, Lewis Good, Youssef Hassane and Geordie Shore star Scotty T. Megan McKenna and Magaluf Weekender cast member Jordan Davies also returned to the series as exes, having previously appeared during the previous series.

=== Series 5 (2016) ===
The fifth series of the show began airing on 16 August 2016. This series took place in Koh Samui, Thailand. The series was confirmed on 8 March 2016 after the finale of the fourth series. It was also announced that faces from the past would return for this series with "unfinished business". The list of cast members was released on 5 July 2016. It featured four men and four women from previous series. From the first series, it included Chloe Goodman and Liam Lewis. Geordie Shore star Gary Beadle and Jess Impiazzi return, having previously appeared in the second series, while Jemma Lucy, Jordan Davies and Stephen Bear from the third series all returned. Finally, Olivia Walsh returned, having previously appeared in series 4. Over the course of the series, they were joined by their exes, which also included familiar faces. Series 1's Ashley Cain made his third appearance on the show, while Joss Mooney also returned. Kayleigh Morris and Melissa Reeves returned, having appeared in the second series. Holly Rickwood from series 3 also returned. New cast members included Lillie Lexie Gregg, Charlotte Dawson, David Hawley, Aimee Kimber, Conor Scurlock and Alex Stewart.

=== Series 6 (2017) ===
The sixth series of the show began airing on 17 January 2017. This series was filmed in Crete, Greece. The series was confirmed on 2 November 2016. The list of cast members included four men; Alex Leslie, Love Island star Josh Ritchie, series 1 cast returnee Ross Worsick and Sean Pratt, and four women; Harriette Harper, Maisie Gillespie, Zahida Allen and ZaraLena Jackson. With the announcement of the line-up, it was also confirmed that Geordie Shore star Aaron Chalmers would be arriving on the beach as an ex as well as former The Only Way Is Essex cast member Nicole Bass.

=== Series 7 (2017) ===
The seventh series of the show began airing on 20 June 2017. This series was filmed on the island of Bali in Indonesia. The cast members for the series were confirmed on 23 May 2017 and included Geordie Shore stars Chloe Ferry and Marty McKenna, Love Island contestants Max Morley and Josh Ritchie and Beauty School Cop Outs cast member Savannah Kemplay. McKenna and Ritchie had previously appeared in the third and sixth of the show, respectively.

=== Series 8 (2018) ===
The eighth series of the show began airing on 20 March 2018 and was filmed in Spain. The series was confirmed in August 2017. The cast for this series was revealed on 20 February 2018 and included Geordie Shore star Marnie Simpson, The X Factor contestant and Stereo Kicks and Union J singer Casey Johnson and former Ibiza Weekender star Laura Louise.

=== Series 9 (2018) ===
The ninth series began airing on 15 August 2018 and concluded on 31 October 2018 following twelve episodes, making this the longest series to date. The cast members for this series were confirmed on 23 July 2018 and featured Made in Chelsea cast member Daisy Robins, as well as The Valleys star Natalee Harris. Jack Delvin, who previously appeared in the sixth series, returned in this series, this time as another ex. The series was filmed in Tulum, Mexico.

=== Series 10 (unaired) ===
The tenth series of Ex on the Beach was set to premiere in spring 2019, but the broadcast was cancelled after the death of Mike Thalassitis, a cast member featured on the series. Series 2 and series 5 contestant, Kayleigh Morris was also set to return to the series for a third time, alongside her ex, The Challenge US star Nelson Thomas. None of the other cast members featured on the tenth series were announced.

=== Series 11 (2023) ===
The eleventh series of the show was confirmed in April 2023, and began airing on 9 May 2023, ending 11 July 2023. This was the first civilian series to heavily feature LGBTQ+ contestants, including George Bebbington and Abbey Myers. This series also featured Geordie Shore: Hot Single Summer star Chloe Adams and former First Dates waiter Grant Urquhart.

== Spin-offs ==
=== Ex on the Beach: Body SOS ===
On 12 December 2017, it was announced that Vicky Pattison would host a spin-off show, titled Ex on the Beach: Body SOS, where she would attempt to help members of the public to get into shape. The first and only series began airing in January 2018 and featured Joss Mooney, who appeared on the first series of Ex on the Beach.

=== Celeb Ex in the City ===
A second spin-off show was launched in late 2020 with an altered format. Each episode featured two celebrities going on a blind date in a London restaurant with their ex arriving halfway through. At the end of the date, the celebrity must decide between the two who to continue to date.

==== Series 1 (2020–2021) ====
The series was filmed according to social distancing guidelines as a result of the COVID-19 pandemic. The series premiered on 8 December 2020. The cast featured Love Island UK stars Megan Barton-Hanson, Michael Griffiths, Jon Clark, Amy Hart and Jess Gale, television personality Calum Best, The Only Way Is Essex stars Liam 'Gatsby' Blackwell and Charlie King, former Hollyoaks actor Malique Thompson-Dwyer, RuPaul's Drag Race UK star Gothy Kendoll, former Sugababes member Amelle Berrabah and Big Brother UK star Aisleyne Horgan-Wallace. Some notable exes included media personality Summer Monteys-Fulham, Love Island stars Charlie Brake, Nabila Badda and Ched Uzor, The X Factor UK contestant Bradley Hunt, fitness model Waz Ashayer and Tinder's most swiped right man Stefan-Pierre Tomlin.

==== Series 2 (2021) ====
The second series premiered on 20 October 2021. The cast featured Love Island UK stars Leanne Amaning, Eve Gale, Arabella Chi, Josh Ritchie and Jack Fincham, Big Brother UK 7 star Imogen Thomas, A Place in the Sun presenter Danni Menzies, The Only Way Is Essex stars Bobby Norris and Demi Sims, The Circle UK stars Manrika Khaira and Freddie Bentley, rugby union player Levi Davis, Ibiza Weekender stars Callum Izzard and Deano Bailey, RuPaul's Drag Race UK contestant Tia Kofi and Olympic gymnast Lisa Mason.

== Controversies ==
Since leaving the series, cast members Vicky Pattison and Megan McKenna have both gone on to express that their biggest regret in life was having sex on camera. In 2016, series 4 cast member Kristina Metcalf spoke with the Liverpool Echo, explaining that she left the show early after feeling uncomfortable due to fellow cast members quote; "bed-hopping" and "sleeping around". She alleged the shows producers attempted to persuade her to stay despite her wanting to leave.

In 2017, series 3 cast member Sarah Goodhart released a series of videos to her YouTube channel, alleging exploitation by the producers of the series. In her video, she claimed the negative image the show carried caused her to lose her job, landing her in debt. She also claimed she was denied her medication for anemia, causing her to fall unwell during filming. Series 6 cast members, Zahida Allen and ZaraLena Jackson showed their support on social media, backing up Goodhart's claims.

In 2019, the tenth series of the show was cancelled and unaired due to the suicide of Love Island contestant Mike Thalassitis, who had just finished filming the series.

In 2020, series 7 cast member Leonie McSorley posted a statement on her Instagram page stating appearing on the show was the worst decision of her life. She claimed they sold her a dream, calling it a manipulative and toxic environment. She alleged the producers told her appearing on the show was her one chance and if she did not comply with what was suggested by the shows producers, she would be sent home.

== International versions ==
Country	Local title	Original channel	Premiere date	Finale date	Season(s)	Ref.
Brazil	De Férias com o Ex Brasil	MTV	13 October 2016	24 June 2021	7	
Brazil	De Férias com o Ex Caribe	MTV/Paramount+	13 January 2022	present	4	
Brazil	De Férias com o Ex Diretoria	MTV/Paramount+	6 June 2024	present	2	
Denmark	Ex on the Beach Denmark	Kanal 4	20 August 2018	1 September 2024	9	
Finland	Exiä rannalla	Sub	7 September 2016	26 October 2016	1	
Finland	Ex on the Beach Suomi	Dplay	3 March 2020	present	5	
France	La Revanche des ex	NRJ 12	22 August 2016	21 October 2016	1	
France	Ex on the Beach France	MTV/Paramount+	25 January 2025	present	1	
Germany	Ex on the Beach	TVNOW/RTL+	1 September 2020	present	7	
Hungary	Exek az Édenben	Viasat 3	18 April 2017	25 May 2017	1	
Italy	Ex on the Beach Italia	MTV/Paramount+	26 September 2018	17 January 2024	5	
Mexico	La Venganza de los Ex	MTV	21 August 2018	30 October 2018	1	
Mexico	La Venganza de los Ex VIP	MTV/Paramount+	9 November 2021	present	5	
Netherlands and Belgium	Ex on the Beach: Double Dutch	MTV	28 August 2016	present	12	
Norway	Ex on the Beach	TVNorge	14 August 2018	5 November 2024	7	
Poland	Ex na plaży Polska	MTV	7 November 2016	5 November 2018	4	
Russia	Экс на пляже	Friday!	7 November 2016	15 December 2017	2	
Sweden	Ex on the Beach	Kanal 5	6 April 2016	11 January 2021	9	
United States	Ex on the Beach	MTV	19 April 2018	27 April 2023	6	
