= St Anthony's Girls' Catholic Academy =

Location
- Thornhill Terrace; Sunderland, Tyne and Wear, SR2 7JN; England; 54.90036°N 1.39126°W

Information
- Type: Academy
- Religious affiliation: Roman Catholic
- Established: 1902
- Founders: Sisters of Mercy
- Local authority: Sunderland City Council
- Department for Education URN: 138054 Tables
- Ofsted: Reports
- Gender: Girls
- Age: 11 to 18
- Website: st-anthonys-academy.com

St Anthony's Girls' Catholic Academy (formerly St Anthony's Girls' Catholic School) is a secondary school and sixth form located in Sunderland, Tyne and Wear, England.

It was established as a grammar school by the Sisters of Mercy in 1902 and relocated to the current site on Thornhill Terrace in 1939. The school became comprehensive in 1972 and became a voluntary aided school in 1976. The school achieved specialisms in technology in 1999 and languages in 2009, and converted to academy status in 2012.

St Anthony's Girls' Catholic Academy offers GCSEs and BTECs as programmes of study for pupils, while girls in the sixth form have the option to study from a range of A-levels and further BTECs.

The current head of school is Mrs Catherine Hammill, and the current executive head teacher is Mrs Francesca Craik.
