= Aaron Chalmers (television personality) =

English mixed martial arts fighter and reality star

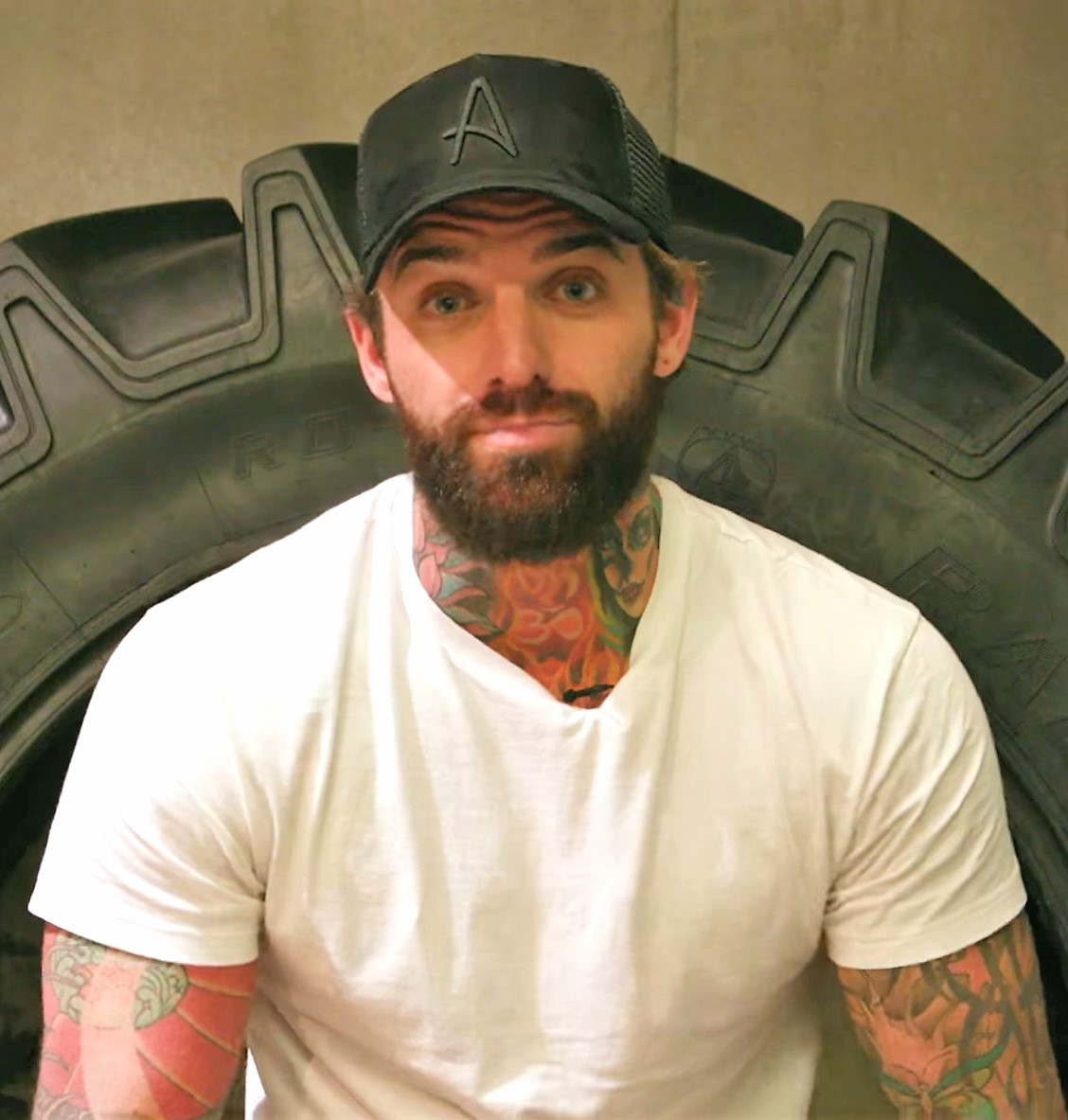
- Chalmers in 2018
- Born: 26 May 1987 (age 39); Newcastle upon Tyne, England
- Other names: The Joker, Squeaky, The Burger Dog!
- Height: 5 ft 10 in (1.78 m)
- Weight: 74 kg (163 lb; 11 st 9 lb)
- Division: Welterweight (2017-18) Lightweight (2019–2021)
- Stance: Orthodox
- Fighting out of: Newcastle upon Tyne, England
- Team: SBG UK, Renegade Jiu-Jitsu; Ultimate Training Center (formerly)
- Years active: 2017–2021 (MMA); 2022–present (Boxing)

Professional boxing record
- Total: 2
- Wins: 1
- Losses: 1

Mixed martial arts record
- Total: 7
- Wins: 5
- By knockout: 2
- By submission: 3
- Losses: 2
- By submission: 1
- By decision: 1

Exhibition boxing record
- Total: 3
- Wins: 1
- Losses: 1
- Draws: 1

Other information
- Children: Romeo A. J. Chalmers; Maddox Chalmers; Oakley Chalmers
- Mixed martial arts record from Sherdog

Aaron Chalmers (born 26 May 1987) is an English retired mixed martial artist, reality television personality and professional boxer. He appeared in the reality shows Geordie Shore and Ex on the Beach. He competed in Bellator MMA.

== Television career ==
On 4 April 2014, it was announced that Chalmers had joined the cast of Geordie Shore for the eighth series. He left the series after sixteenth series. In 2025, his return for twenty-sixth series was announced.

He appeared in the sixth series of Ex on the Beach as the ex of Maisie Gillespie. The series began airing on 17 January 2017. In 2019, Chalmers began starring in the MTV series Geordie Shore OGs, a spinoff series of Geordie Shore. Before becoming well-known, he worked as a scaffolder on an oil rig.

== Mixed martial arts career ==
=== BAMMA (2017) ===
Having previously practiced Muay Thai, he had his first MMA fight in May 2017, beating Greg Jenkins. He won his second professional fight at BAMMA 31 at the SSE Arena beating Alex Thompson by KO on 15 September 2017. His third and final fight for BAMMA was a win (by TKO) against Karl Donaldson on 15 December in his home town arena the Metro Radio Arena in Newcastle.

=== Bellator (2018–2021) ===
In March 2018, Chalmers announced he would be joining Bellator. He had his first fight against Ash Griffiths on 25 May 2018 for the Bellator 200 event at Wembley Arena. He won the fight via technical submission in the first round. In his second outing for the promotion, Chalmers suffered his first defeat as a professional fighter, as he was defeated by American Corey Browning by submission in the third round. In June 2019, Chalmers returned to the win column with a submission victory over Fred Freeman.

Chalmers next faced Austin Clem in a welterweight bout at Bellator 240 on February 22, 2020. He lost the bout via unanimous decision (30-27 x2, 30-26).

Chalmers announced his retirement from MMA competition in an IGTV video posted on 18 February 2021.

== Boxing career ==
=== Professional career ===
==== Chalmers vs Zeledon ====
Chalmers made his switch from MMA to Boxing in March 2022. Chalmers had his first professional fight against Alexander Zeledon on 17 June 2022. Chalmers won the bout by outpointing his opponent 39-37 on the judges cards.

==== Chalmers vs Virgo ====
On 30 August 2023, it was announced that Chalmers would face English professional boxer Idris Virgo (13-0-1) as the headliner to MF & DAZN: X Series 009 at the Vertu Motors Arena in Newcastle upon Tyne, England on 23 September 2023. Virgo defeated Chalmers via third round technical knockout.

=== Exhibition bouts ===
==== Mayweather Jr. vs Chalmers ====
In January 2023, it was announced that Chalmers would face former unified multiple division champion Floyd Mayweather Jr. in an exhibition bout, after his original opponent for the fight, Muay Thai fighter Liam Harrison, pulled out. The bout took place at the O2 Arena in London, England on 25 February 2023. The bout went the full 8 rounds, there was no scoring and it ended without an official verdict

==== Chalmers vs Crosbie ====
On 15 July 2023, Chalmers fought Irish mixed martial artist Kiefer Crosbie as a "wildcard" bout on the High Stakes Tournament Semi-Finals undercard at the 3Arena in Dublin, Ireland. Crosbie defeated Chalmers via unanimous decision with judges' scorecards of 50-45 (twice) and 48-45 in Crosbie's favour.

=== Bare-knuckle boxing ===
Chalmers made his Bare Knuckle Fighting Championship debut against Chas Symonds on 5 April 2025 at BKFC 72 Dubai: Day 2. He won the fight by technical knockout in the third round.

Chalmers faced Darren Till on 30 May 2026 at BKFC 90. He lost the fight by knockout in the second round.

== Filmography ==
Year	Title	Role	Note
2014–2018, 2022, 2026–	Geordie Shore	Himself	Cast member
2017	Ex on the Beach	Himself	Ex of Maisie Gillespie
2018–2019	Just Tattoo of Us	Himself	Guest Presenter
2019–2021	Geordie Shore OGs	Himself	Cast member
2020	Geordie Shore: Their History	Himself	Cast member

== Mixed martial arts record ==
Professional record breakdown
7 matches	5 wins	2 losses
By knockout	2	0
By submission	3	1
By decision	0	1

Res.	Record	Opponent	Method	Event	Date	Round	Time	Location	Notes
Loss	5–2	Austin Clem	Decision (unanimous)	Bellator 240	22 February 2020	3	5:00	Dublin, Ireland	Welterweight bout.
Win	5–1	Fred Freeman	Submission (triangle choke)	Bellator 223	22 June 2019	2	4:05	London, England	Catchweight (160 lbs) bout.
Loss	4–1	Corey Browning	Submission (heel hook)	Bellator Newcastle	9 February 2019	3	0:20	Utilita Arena, Newcastle, England, United Kingdom	Lightweight debut
Win	4–0	Ash Griffiths	Technical Submission (guillotine choke)	Bellator 200	25 May 2018	1	1:55	The SSE Arena, London, England, United Kingdom	Catchweight (163 lbs) bout.
Win	3–0	Karl Donaldson	TKO (punches)	BAMMA 33	15 December 2017	1	0:43	Metro Radio Arena, Newcastle, England, United Kingdom	
Win	2–0	Alex Thompson	KO (punch)	BAMMA 31	15 September 2017	1	0:30	The SSE Arena, London, England, United Kingdom	
Win	1–0	Greg Jenkins	Submission (Americana)	BAMMA 29	12 May 2017	1	2:12	Genting Arena, Birmingham, England, United Kingdom	

== Boxing record ==
=== Professional ===
1 fight	1 win	0 losses
By decision	1	0

No.	Result	Record	Opponent	Type	Round, time	Date	Location	Notes
1	Win	1–0	Alexander Zeledon	PTS	4	17 June 2022	Echo Arena, Liverpool, England	

=== MF–Professional ===
1 fight	0 wins	1 loss
By knockout	0	1

No.	Result	Record	Opponent	Type	Round, time	Date	Location	Notes
1	Loss	0–1	Idris Virgo	TKO	3 (5), 1:48	23 Sep 2023	Vertu Motors Arena, Newcastle upon tyne, England	

=== Exhibition ===
3 fights	1 win	1 loss
By decision	1	1
Non-scored	1	

No.	Result	Record	Opponent	Type	Round, time	Date	Location	Notes
3	Win	1–1 (1)	Warren Spencer	UD	5	24 Nov 2023	Yume Theatre, Dubai, UAE	
2	Loss	0–1 (1)	Kiefer Crosbie	UD	5	15 July 2023	3Arena, Dublin, Ireland	
1	—N/a	0–0 (1)	Floyd Mayweather Jr.	—N/a	8	25 Feb 2023	The O2 Arena, London, England	Non-scored bout

== Bare knuckle boxing record ==
Professional record breakdown
3 matches	2 wins	1 loss
By knockout	2	1

Res.	Record	Opponent	Method	Event	Date	Round	Time	Location	Notes
Loss	2–1	Darren Till	KO (punch)	BKFC 90	30 May 2026	2	0:22	Birmingham, England	
Win	2–0	Jack Fincham	TKO (straight right)	BKFC 81	27 September 2025	2	2:00	Manchester, England	
Win	1–0	Chas Symonds	TKO (left hook)	BKFC 72 Dubai: Day 2	5 April 2025	3	0:16	Dubai, United Arab Emirates	
