= Marnie Simpson =

English television personality

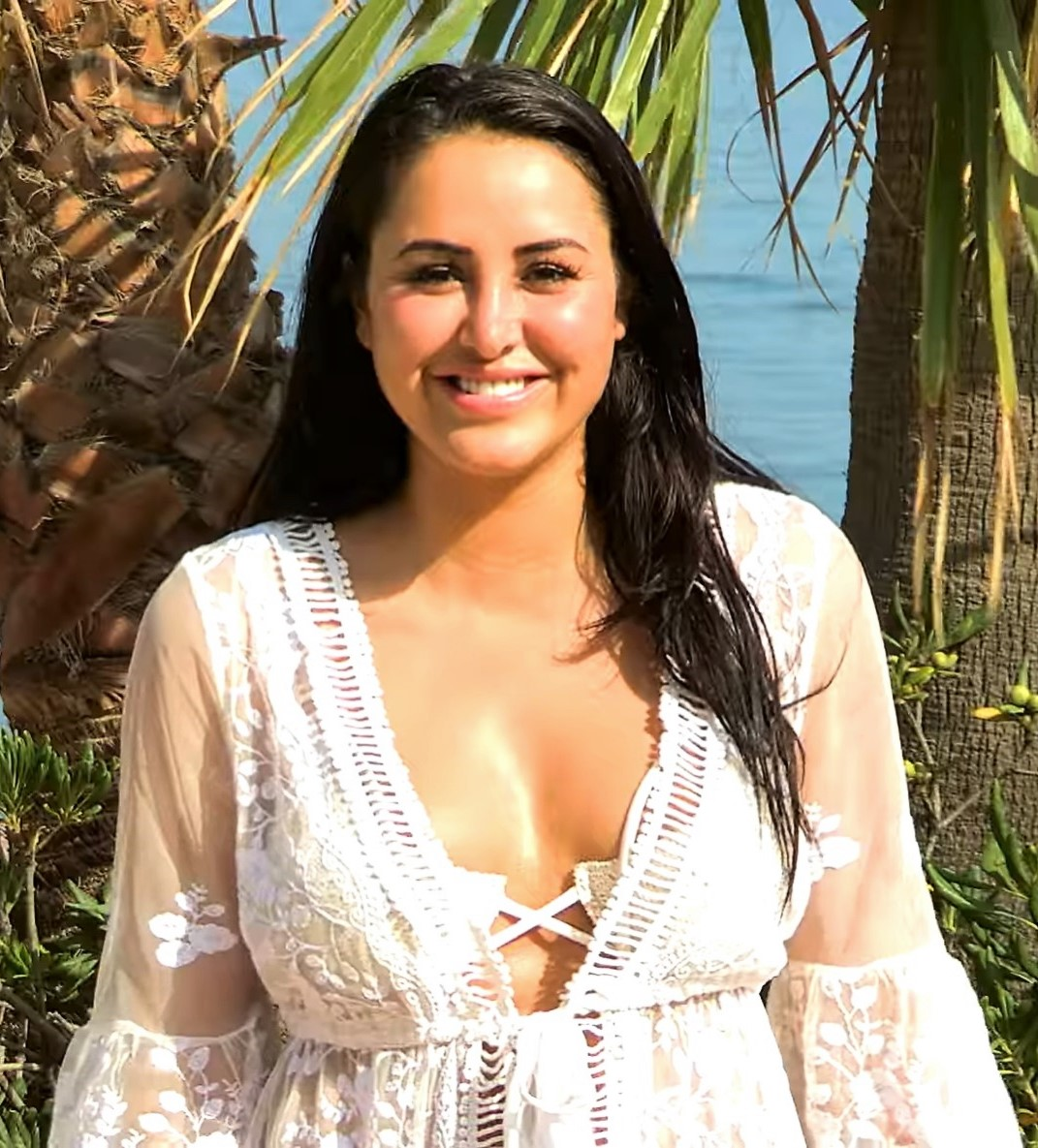
- Simpson in 2018
- Born: Marnie Hampton; 17 January 1992 (age 34); South Shields, England
- Occupation: Television personality
- Years active: 2011–present
- Television: Geordie Shore; Celebrity Big Brother
- Spouse: Casey Johnson (m. 2023)
- Children: 3
- Relatives: Sophie Kasaei (cousin)

Marnie Simpson (born 17 January 1992) is an English television personality from South Shields, South Tyneside. She appeared on the MTV reality series Geordie Shore. In 2016, she finished in fourth place on the eighteenth series of Celebrity Big Brother, and appeared on the eighth series of Ex on the Beach.

== Career ==
Simpson joined Geordie Shore in 2013, she had previously appeared in a club scene from series 1 in episode 4. Simpson left the series in 2015 at the end of the eleventh series, but returned in the twelfth series. In 2016, she took part in the eighteenth series of Celebrity Big Brother where she finished in fourth place. In 2017, she returned to Big Brother 18, as a special guest for a shopping task. Simpson also took part in series eight of Ex on the Beach. Later in 2017, she released her own range of contact lenses, under the brand 'I Spy Eyes'. In 2019, Simpson began starring in the MTV series Geordie Shore OGs, a spinoff series of Geordie Shore. Since April 2022, Simpson has been filming again with the cast of Geordie Shore.

== Personal life ==
Before appearing on Geordie Shore, Simpson was a runner-up in Miss Newcastle, and she worked as a waitress. She was previously engaged to then boyfriend Ricky Rayment from The Only Way Is Essex on Season 11 of Geordie Shore, but then broke it off & returned to the show in Season 12. Her cousin is a fellow Geordie Shore cast member, Sophie Kasaei. In April 2019, she announced that she was pregnant, and 29 October 2019, she gave birth to her son named Rox with partner Casey Johnson. They have a second son named Oax, born in May 2022. Marnie announced in February 2025 that she and Johnson were expecting their third child together. They welcomed a baby girl, Kixee in July 2025.

== Filmography ==
As herself
Year	Title	Note
2013–2018, 2022–2026	Geordie Shore	Cast member (123 Episodes)
2016	Celebrity Big Brother	Housemate; 18th series
2017	Big Brother	VIP houseguest; 18th series
2017	Single AF	Cast member
2018	In Therapy	Series 3, Episode 4
2018	Ex on the Beach	Main cast; 8th series
2019–2021	Geordie Shore OGs	Main cast
2020	Geordie Shore: Their History	Cast member
2021, 2023–	Geordie React	Cast member
2022	That’s What She Said	Co-host (season 6)
2023	All Star Shore	Contestant; Season 2
2024	Celebrity SAS Who Dares Wins	Contestant; Season 6
