= Sophie Kasaei =

English television personality

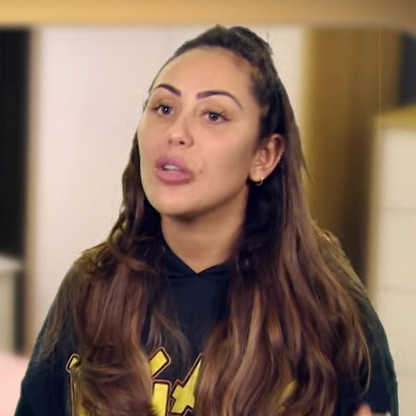
- Kasaei in 2018
- Born: Sophia Zarie Kasaei; South Shields, England
- Occupation: Television personality
- Years active: 2011–present
- Children: 1
- Relatives: Marnie Simpson (cousin)

Sophie Kasaei is an English television personality. She starred on the MTV reality series Geordie Shore from 2011 to 2013, returned from 2016 to 2019, and appeared in the spinoff series Geordie Shore OGs. Kasaei also appeared on Just Tattoo of Us in 2017 and starred in Celebrity Ex on the Beach in 2020. In 2023, she joined the cast of the ITV reality series The Only Way Is Essex.

== Career ==
Kasaei joined Geordie Shore in 2011 during its first series, but was axed from the series in 2013 after she used a racial slur off camera. She returned during the Geordie Shore: Big Birthday Battle series, then left again in 2019 following the nineteenth series. In 2020, Kasaei appeared on Celebrity Ex on the Beach. She joined the cast of The Only Way Is Essex in 2023.

== Personal life ==
Kasaei is of Persian heritage. She is a cousin of former Geordie Shore co-star Marnie Simpson. From 2011 to 2017, Kasaei was in a relationship with Joel Corry, a producer and record label owner. Since 2022, she has been in a relationship with fellow television personality Jordan Brook. In December 2025, they announced that they were expecting their first child. In June 2026, Kasaei announced on her instagram that she welcomed their son named Brody Jordan Daryll Brook.

== Filmography ==
Year	Title	Notes
2011–2013, 2016–2019, 2022–present	Geordie Shore	Main cast
2017	Just Tattoo of Us	Cameo
2018–2021	That's What She Said	Co-host (series 3–4)
2019	Geordie Cribs	Web series
2020	Geordie Shore OG's	Cast member
2020	Celebrity Ex on the Beach	Main cast
2023–present	The Only Way Is Essex	Main cast
2024	Geordie Stories: Sophie's Fertility Journey	Documentary; 4 episodes
