= Charlotte Crosby =

English television personality

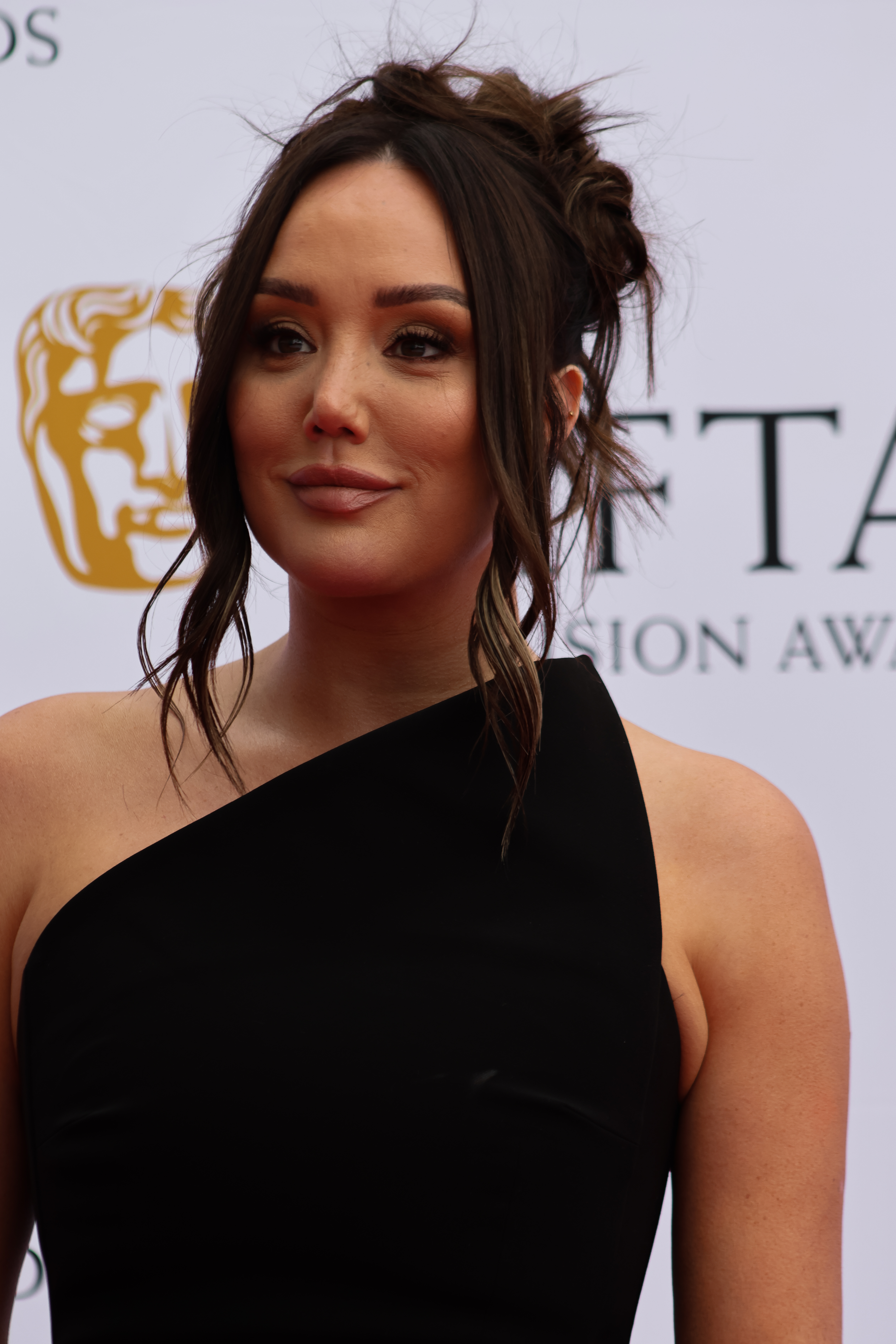
- Crosby at the 2026 British Academy Television Awards
- Born: Charlotte-Letitia Crosby; 17 May 1990 (age 36); Sunderland, England
- Occupation: Television personality
- Years active: 2011–present
- Television: Geordie Shore (2011–2016, 2022, 2024); Celebrity Big Brother (2013); Just Tattoo of Us (2017–2019); The Charlotte Show (2018–2019); I'm a Celebrity...Get Me Out of Here! (AU) (2020); The Masked Singer Australia (2023)
- Children: 2
- Website: Official website

Charlotte Letitia Crosby (born 17 May 1990) is an English television personality, known for appearing in the MTV reality series Geordie Shore (2011–2016, 2022–2024) and winning the twelfth series of Celebrity Big Brother in 2013. In 2017, she began presenting Just Tattoo of Us, and in 2018, Crosby began starring in her own reality series, The Charlotte Show.

== Early life ==
Charlotte-Letitia Crosby was born on 17 May 1990 in Sunderland and educated at St Anthony's Girls' Catholic Academy, where she completed her A-level exams. Originally considering studying criminology at university, she successfully auditioned and was cast to appear in the Tyne and Wear-based reality series Geordie Shore.

== Career ==
=== Geordie Shore ===
Crosby was an original cast member of MTV's reality series Geordie Shore, which she had starred in since 2011. She featured in 12 series of the show. She became known for an on/off relationship with fellow cast member Gaz Beadle. In June 2016, she announced her departure from the show via Twitter.

Crosby returned for two more seasons of Geordie Shore in 2022 and 2024.

=== Further television and media appearances ===
In November 2012, alongside her Geordie Shore cast members, Crosby guest appeared at the 2012 MTV Europe Music Awards where they presented the award for Best Male, which Justin Bieber won. In February 2013, Crosby appeared on The Sarah Millican Television Programme, alongside her Geordie Shore cast members Gary Beadle, James Tindale and Holly Hagan.

On 23 August 2013, Crosby participated in the twelfth series of Celebrity Big Brother. On 13 September, she was crowned winner of the series.

In 2013, Crosby hosted the BBC Radio 1 Teen Awards. Crosby was also a regular panellist on This Morning for the fashion strand 'Rate or Slate', and regularly appeared on panels for ITV series including Britain's Got More Talent, The Xtra Factor and Celebrity Juice. In January 2014, it was confirmed that Crosby would have her own reality series on TLC, where she would spend time in different cultures and live with some of the world's unique communities. "I am bursting with excitement about my new show with TLC. I literally want to run around shouting about it from the rooftops!" The series was titled The Charlotte Crosby Experience.

In January 2015, MTV UK announced that Crosby was set to star in the second series of reality series Ex on the Beach. The series premiered later that month. Crosby joined the cast in the villa in the series fifth episode, appearing as an ex of fellow Geordie Shore cast member Gary Beadle.

Crosby occasionally hosts MTV News and also had a regular column in Star Magazine. On 19 September 2015, Crosby and her home appeared on comedy panel game show Through the Keyhole. She has also made guest appearances on programmes such as Staying In, Fake Reaction, Most Shocking Celebrity Moments, 50 Funniest Moments and Utterly Outrageous Moments.

Crosby's autobiography, ME ME ME, was published in July 2015. The book topped the Sunday Times bestseller list. On 4 August 2015, Crosby appeared on BBC Radio 1's Innuendo Bingo.

In 2016, Crosby had her own special on Chart Show TV, titled Charlotte Crosby's Propa Mint Party, where she played a collection of her favourite music videos. In 2016, she was a contributor to the Channel 4 documentary series A Granny's Guide to the Modern World. She offered an insight on life as a celebrity to the older generation. In August 2016, Crosby narrated Channel 5 documentary-reality series Tattoo Disasters U.K. In August 2016, she announced that she was set to appear in E4 dating series Celebs Go Dating. The series ran from the end of August until the middle of September 2016. In October 2016, Crosby appeared on Celebrity Storage Hunters UK and later that month, she appeared on Tipping Point: Lucky Stars.

In December 2016, Crosby was the star of MTV Asks Charlotte Crosby, set in her house in the North East of England. Later that month, she made a guest appearance on the Christmas special of In Bed with Jamie on E4, which was also set in her home. On 25 December 2016, Crosby made her radio presenting debut on Heat Radio where she co-presented an afternoon show with Lucie Cave.

From 27 February to 3 March 2017, Crosby was a stand-in presenter on the Capital North East breakfast show whilst the regular hosts took a week off. She reprised this role in February 2018, June 2018 and September 2018. In June 2017, Crosby published her second autobiography, Brand New Me. In contrast to her first book, it was published in a diary format. The book became a Sunday Times bestseller, the second of Crosby's books to peak at number 1.

In January 2019, Crosby appeared on the fourth series of Celebrity Coach Trip, alongside boyfriend Josh Ritchie. The couple reached the final and finished as runner-ups. In August 2019, Crosby began appearing in the seventh series of Celebs Go Dating to undergo 'couples coaching' alongside Ritchie. She had previously starred in the first series.

On 2 January 2020, Crosby was revealed as the second contestant participating in the sixth series of the Australian version of I'm a Celebrity...Get Me Out of Here!.

During the COVID-19 pandemic, Crosby remotely presented MTV Games Night with Charlotte Crosby for MTV's digital strand for six weeks. Crosby undertook self-filming and production roles to facilitate airing the show. Crosby followed this project by remotely presenting the comedy clip show Charlotte Crosby’s Lockdown Laughs for MTV networks globally.

On 1 February 2023, Crosby began presenting her ten-part documentary series Charlotte in Sunderland on BBC Three, based on her personal life in her home city of Sunderland, with new double-bill episodes dropping weekly from then.

In October 2023, Crosby was revealed to be the "Space Fairy" on the fifth season of the Australian version of The Masked Singer. While on the show, the judges praised her singing abilities, saying that they thought that she was a Grammy Award winner. However, she was eliminated on episode 5 after three performances.

=== The Charlotte Show ===
In 2018, it was confirmed Crosby would star in her own MTV reality series. The series, titled The Charlotte Show, premiered on 28 March 2018.

The second series premiered on 30 January 2019. After the series finale, it was confirmed that The Charlotte Show would return for a third series, which premiered on 18 June 2019.

The series broadcasts on all major MTV networks globally. The show debuted on free-to-air television in Australia on 10 Shake in September 2020 alongside Just Tattoo of Us.

=== Clothing range ===
In 2014, Crosby launched a fashion line titled "Nostalgia", in association with British online fashion retailer In The Style. Since then, she has continued to launch regular collections; however, it is no longer marketed under the "Nostalgia" brand, simply being referred to by Crosby's name.

=== Fitness DVDs and books ===
On 26 December 2014, Crosby released her first fitness DVD, Charlotte's 3 Minute Belly Blitz. The workout DVD featured Richard Callendar and weight loss expert David Souter. It became the UK's fastest selling fitness DVD, selling 101,000 copies in its first four weeks on sale. Within a month, it became the sixth best-selling fitness DVD of the decade. At the end of 2015, it was the 31st biggest selling DVD of the year. Since the release of the DVD, it has continually remained at the top ends of the Sports & Fitness DVD charts.

In 2015, Crosby released her second fitness DVD, Charlotte's 3 Minute Bum Blitz. The object of the DVD is to get a 'more peachy bum'. It uses the same trainers as 3 Minute Belly Blitz.

In April 2016, Crosby published her first health and fitness book, Live Fast, Lose Weight: Fat to Fit. The book details her tips and tricks on keeping fit and 80 recipes for a healthy lifestyle.

In January 2018, Crosby published her second health and fitness book, 30 Day Blitz. She promoted the book with a series of signings throughout the UK.

== Personal life ==
From December 2015 to April 2016, Crosby and Gaz Beadle started a relationship outside of filming Geordie Shore. This came to an end following Crosby's ectopic pregnancy. (She is now an ambassador of The Ectopic Pregnancy Trust.) Crosby had surgery at St John and Elizabeth hospital, in London, which involved the removal of her left fallopian tube. At the same time, Beadle cheated on her, leading to the end of their relationship. From 2018 to 2019, Crosby was in a relationship with Josh Ritchie. In early 2020, she dated Liam Beaumont, a videographer and content creator she reportedly met in Dubai, but the two split in August 2021.

Since late 2021, Crosby has been dating businessman Jake Ankers. On 12 April 2022, Crosby announced on Instagram that she and Ankers were expecting their first child. On 20 June 2022, she revealed on her Instagram that she was expecting a girl. She gave birth to her daughter in October 2022. In November 2023, Crosby and Ankers announced their engagement. On 21 November 2024, her home was broken into while she was inside with her two-year-old and her partner; no one was hurt.

She supports Sunderland A.F.C.

== Controversies ==
In 2012, Crosby was convicted of drink-driving, she received an 18-month driving ban and a £250 fine.

In 2016, Crosby was arrested in Newcastle City Centre when police pulled her over in a Range Rover after witnesses reported seeing it being driven erratically. She was found to be almost three times over the legal drink drive limit and was subsequently convicted for driving under the influence for a second time and was banned from driving for three years and was fined £1,185.

In March 2022, Crosby was added to the UK's Advertising Standards Agency list of "non-compliant social media influencers" for improperly advertising products on her social media channels without disclosing her conflicts of interest or the fact that the products were part of an advertising campaign.

== Filmography ==
As herself
| Year | Title | Note |
|---|---|---|
| 2011–2016, 2022–2024 | Geordie Shore | Main cast; 115 episodes |
| 2013 | Celebrity Big Brother | Housemate; winner of series 12 |
| 2014 | The Charlotte Crosby Experience | Presenter |
| 2015 | Ex on the Beach | Gary Beadle's ex; series 2 |
| 2016 | Charlotte Crosby's Propa Mint Party | Presenter |
| 2016 | Tattoo Disasters UK | Narrator and presenter |
| 2016 | Celebrity Storage Hunters UK | Main buyer |
| 2016 | MTV Asks Charlotte Crosby | |
| 2016, 2019 | Celebs Go Dating | 2 series |
| 2017–2020 | Just Tattoo of Us | Presenter |
| 2017 | Celeb Ghost Hunt Live | One-off special |
| 2017 | Single AF | Narrator and presenter |
| 2018–2019 | The Charlotte Show | Main role |
| 2019 | Celebrity Coach Trip | Contestant; series 4 |
| 2019 | Impossible Celebrities | Contestant; series 2 |
| 2019–2021 | Geordie Shore OGs | Guest; series 1–4 |
| 2020 | I'm a Celebrity...Get Me Out of Here! (Australia) | Contestant; 5th place, series 6 |
| 2020 | Celebrity Come Dine with Me | Contestant; 3rd place |
| 2020 | MTV Games Night with Charlotte Crosby | Presenter |
| 2020 | Charlotte Crosby’s Lockdown Laughs | Presenter |
| 2020 | Geordie Shore: Their Story | Main role |
| 2021 | The Celebrity Circle | Contestant; series 1 (Catfishing as Peter Andre) |
| 2021 | Geordie React | Main role |
| 2021 | Geordie Shore: Ten Years On The Toon | Main role (2 episodes) |
| 2023–2024 | Charlotte In Sunderland | Main role (2 series) |
| 2023 | The Masked Singer Australia | Contestant; series 5 ("Space Fairy") |
| 2024 | Celebrity MasterChef | Contestant; series 19 |
| 2024–present | Aussie Shore | Boss |
| 2025–present | Geordie Stories: Charlotte's New Baby | Main role |

=== Guest appearances ===
- The Sarah Millican Television Programme (5 February 2013)
- Big Brother's Bit on the Side (22 August–13 September 2013; 3 January 17 June 11 September 2014; 23 January 2015, 8 January 28 July 2016)
- The Wright Stuff (17 September 2013, 8 January 2015)
- Celebrity Juice (19 September 2013; 8 May, 23 October 2014; 31 March 2016)
- This Morning (24 September 5 November 2013; 7 January 2014; 4 January 19 April 2016, 3 April 2017, 19–23 June 2017, (Note: Host of the week long competition segment.) 3 July 2017, 2 October 2017, 3 January 2018, 28 March 2018, 30 July 2018, 28 November 2023, 19 November 2025, 19 May 2026)
- Celebrity Wedding Planner (18 October 2013)
- The Xtra Factor (10 November 15 December 2013, December 2015, September 2016)
- Fake Reaction (9 January 2014)
- Viral Tap (4 May 2014)
- Britain's Got More Talent (29 May 2014, May 2015, 22 May 2016, 6 May 2017, 28 May 2018)
- Tricked (23 September 2014)
- Safeword (30 July 2015)
- Through the Keyhole (19 September 2015)
- Release the Hounds (28 October 2015)
- Up Late with Rylan (9–11, 31 May 2016)
- Loose Women (10 May 2016, 13 July 2017)
- A Granny's Guide to the Modern World (17 August 2016)
- My Dad Wrote a Porno (6 October 2016)
- Tipping Point: Lucky Stars (15 October 2016)
- In Bed with Jamie at Christmas (26 December 2016)
- Drunk History UK (as Isaac Newton's mother; 12 April 2017)
- Ireland AM (23 August 2017)
- Celebrity Psych Test (25 September 2017)
- The 6 O'Clock Show (27 October 2017)
- Pointless Celebrities (4 November 2017)
- The Reality TV Story (June 2018)
- The Crystal Maze (22 June 2018)
- CelebAbility (4 July 2018)
- MTV TOP 100 Germany (13 July 2018)
- Good Morning Britain (25 January 2019)
- MTV Hits Brazil (25 June 2019)
- The Big Fat Quiz of the Decade (2 January 2020)
- Studio 10 (29 January 2020, 20 February 2020, 1 April 2020, 29 September 2020)
- The Project (30 January 2020, 10 October 2023, 25 April 2024)
- Have You Been Paying Attention? NZ (26 February 2020)
- Have You Been Paying Attention? (28 September 2020)
- Celebrity Mastermind (19 December 2020)
- Celebrity Help! My House is Haunted (January 2022)
- Steph's Packed Lunch (2 March 2023)
- BBC Morning Live (15 November 2023)
- The Weakest Link (30 December 2023)
- Geordie Stories: Sophie's Fertility Journey (16 December 2024)
- Celebrity Big Brother: Late & Live (14 March 2024, 9 November 2025)
- The One Show (12 August 2024, September 2025, October 2026)
- Sara Davies’ Christmas Craft Off (5 December 2025)

| Preceded by Rylan Clark | Celebrity Big Brother UK winner Series 12 (2013) | Succeeded by Jim Davidson |
