= Celebrity Big Brother (British TV series) series 19 =

Celebrity Big Brother
- Series 19
- Series nineteen logo
- Presented by: Emma Willis
- No. of days: 32
- No. of housemates: 18
- Winner: Coleen Nolan
- Runner-up: Jedward
- Companion shows: Big Brother's Bit on the Side
- No. of episodes: 36

Release
- Original network: Channel 5
- Original release: 3 January – 3 February 2017

Series chronology
- ← Previous; Series 18 Next → Series 20

Celebrity Big Brother 19, also known as Celebrity Big Brother: All-Stars vs. New Stars, is the nineteenth series of the British reality television series Celebrity Big Brother, hosted by Emma Willis and narrated by Marcus Bentley. The series launched on 3 January 2017 and concluded after 32 days on 3 February 2017, making it the joint longest celebrity series to date along with Celebrity Big Brother 17. The series was shown on Channel 5 in the United Kingdom and 3e in Ireland. Rylan Clark-Neal continued to present the spin-off show Celebrity Big Brother's Bit on the Side. It was the twelfth celebrity series and eighteenth series of Big Brother overall to air on Channel 5.

With eighteen housemates, this series has the most housemates since the show began in 2001. It also marks the only celebrity series to have housemates returning to represent previous series and is the first to include two sets of late entrants. As well as this, it also included the voluntary exits of Brandon Block and Ray J.

On 3 February 2017, the series was won by Coleen Nolan having received 32.65% of the final vote, with Jedward finishing as the runners-up with 29.91% of the final vote. Kim Woodburn was the highest placed "New star" finishing in third place with 14.52% of the final vote.

== Format ==
Celebrity Big Brother is a game show in which a group of celebrity contestants, referred to as housemates, live in isolation from the outside world in a custom built "house", constantly under video surveillance. During their time in the House, the housemates are required to nominate two of their fellow contestants for potential eviction, and the two or more with the most votes would be nominated. This process is mandatory for all housemates, and failure to comply could result in expulsion from the House. The public then vote, with one of those celebrities evicted from the house. When the final week arrives, the viewers vote for which of the remaining celebrities should win the series, and the housemate with the most votes becomes the winner.

During their time in the House, housemates are given weekly tasks to perform. The housemates wager a portion of their weekly shopping budget on the task, and either win double their wagered fund or lose the wagered fund depending on their performance in the task. The housemates are required to work as a group to complete their tasks, with the format of the tasks varying based on the number of remaining housemates. Throughout the series, some housemates have been given secret tasks that must either be completed individually or with a small group; failure to do so can result in the housemate being nominated or punished in the House. Should the housemates run out of the food provided for them, an emergency ration was available to them. The housemates are forbidden from discussing nominations, and doing so could result in punishment. The format of the series is mainly seen as a social experiment, and requires housemates to interact with others who may have differing ideals, beliefs, and prejudices. Housemates are also required to make visits to the Diary Room during their stay in the House, where they are able to share their thoughts and feelings on their fellow housemates and the game.

== Housemates ==
Ahead of the series, it was announced that some ex-housemates would return to compete against some new celebrity housemates. Fourteen housemates entered the house on Day 1 including seven "All stars" and seven "New stars". A further All-Star, Jedward entered the house on Day 4. Then on Day 11, a further three "New stars" entered.

Celebrity	Previous status		Age on entry	Notability	Day entered	Day exited	Result
Celebrity	Series	Result	Age on entry	Notability	Day entered	Day exited	Result
Coleen Nolan	Celebrity Big Brother 10	Runner-up	51	Singer and TV presenter	1	32	Winner
Jedward (Note: "Jedward" is the collective name for the twins John and Edward Grimes who entered the House together on Day 4 and were treated as a single Housemate for the duration of the series.)	Celebrity Big Brother 8	3rd place	25	Singers	4	32	Runners-up
Kim Woodburn	—N/a		74	Television presenter and expert cleaner	11	32	3rd place
James Cosmo	—N/a		69	Actor	1	32	4th place
Nicola McLean	Celebrity Big Brother 9	Evicted	35	Model and media personality	1	32	5th place
Bianca Gascoigne	—N/a		30	Model and TV personality	1	32	6th place
Calum Best	Celebrity Big Brother 15	3rd place	35	Model and TV personality	1	29	Evicted
Jamie O'Hara	—N/a		30	Footballer	1	27	Evicted
Heidi Montag (Note: Heidi and Spencer entered the House together on Day 1 and were treated as a single Housemate under the collective name "Heidi and Spencer" for the duration of the series.)	Celebrity Big Brother 11	Runners-up	30	Reality TV stars	1	25	Evicted
Spencer Pratt	Celebrity Big Brother 11	Runners-up	33	Reality TV stars	1	25	Evicted
Jessica Cunningham	—N/a		29	Reality TV star	11	25	Evicted
Stacy Francis	—N/a		47	Singer and reality TV star	1	22	Evicted
Chloe Ferry	—N/a		21	Reality TV star	11	18	Evicted
James Jordan	Celebrity Big Brother 14	3rd place	38	Professional dancer	1	15	Evicted
Jasmine Waltz	Celebrity Big Brother 13	Evicted	34	US media personality	1	13	Evicted
Austin Armacost	Celebrity Big Brother 16	Runner-up	28	Reality TV star	1	11	Evicted
Angie Best	—N/a		64	Model and ex-wife of George Best	1	11	Evicted
Brandon Block	—N/a		49	DJ	1	9	Walked
Ray J	—N/a		35	Singer and TV personality	1	8	Walked

=== Angie Best ===
Angie Best is an English model and former Playboy Bunny, known as the first wife of footballer George Best. Together they had one son, Calum Best who is also a housemate. She fitness coached and trained celebrity clients, including pop star Cher and actresses Sharon Stone and Daryl Hannah and wrote her autobiography George and Me: My Autobiography in 2002. She entered the house on Day 1 as a "new star". She became the first housemate to be evicted on Day 11.

=== Austin Armacost ===
Austin Armacost is an American reality television personality and model, who is best known for his role in The A-List: New York, as well as dating fashion designer Marc Jacobs. He entered the house as an "All star" on Day 1 having previously competed in Celebrity Big Brother 16, finishing runner-up behind James Hill. He became the second housemate to be evicted on Day 11 following a twist. Austin made a brief return on Day 26 for a "Final Judgement" task.

=== Bianca Gascoigne ===
Bianca Gascoigne is a British glamour model and television personality. Gascoigne has appeared in Loaded, Nuts and FHM. In 2006, Gascoigne won ITV's reality TV show Love Island with fellow housemate Calum Best and in 2010, she took part in Celebrity Coach Trip with her friend and Big Brother 7 contestant Imogen Thomas. She is the daughter of Sheryl Gascoigne, and former stepdaughter of Paul Gascoigne, an ex-footballer. She entered the house as a "new star" on Day 1. She left on Day 32 finishing in sixth place.

=== Brandon Block ===
Brandon Block is a British DJ. He has held residencies at Up Yer Ronson in Leeds, FUBAR at the Milk Bar in London, Club For Life in London, and Scream in Plymouth. He has also played numerous other venues such as the Ministry of Sound. Muzik magazine awarded Block the "Caner of the Year" prize three times. He had three singles released under his Blockster alias – "Something Goin' On", "Grooveline" and "You Should Be.." –, all of which were released by Ministry of Sound. Block is also well known for appearing on stage heavily intoxicated at the 2000 Brit Awards, as well as starring on Trust Me – I'm A Holiday Rep, The Weakest Link and Come Dine with Me. He entered the house as a "new star" on Day 1. On Day 9, Brandon walked from the house.

=== Calum Best ===
Calum Best is a British-American former fashion model, television personality, and occasional actor. He is also known as the son of the late football icon, George Best and former Playboy model and fellow housemate Angie Best. He won the second series of Celebrity Love Island in 2006 and appeared in the ITV2 series Calum, Fran and Dangerous Danan, with Fran Cosgrave and Paul Danan. He was also featured in the MTV show Totally Calum Best, where it detailed Best's attempts to remain celibate for fifty days. He entered the house on Day 1 as an All-Star having previously competed in Celebrity Big Brother 15 finishing in third place behind Katie Price and Katie Hopkins. He was the tenth housemate to be evicted on Day 29.

=== Chloe Ferry ===
Chloe Ferry is a British reality television personality, best known as a cast member in the MTV reality series, Geordie Shore from series 10 onwards. She entered the house on Day 11 as a "New star" as part of the 'Weekend from Hell' twist. She became the fifth housemate to be evicted on Day 18.

=== Coleen Nolan ===
Coleen Nolan is an English television presenter, author, singer, and the youngest member of the girl group The Nolans. Nolan has since been a panellist on Loose Women and a contestant on Dancing on Ice. She entered the house on Day 1 as an All-Star after competing in Celebrity Big Brother 10 and coming runner-up to Julian Clary. She left the house on Day 32 as the winner.

=== Heidi Montag & Spencer Pratt ===
Heidi Montag and Spencer Pratt, know collectively as Speidi, are an American reality television couple best known for starring in the MTV reality series The Hills from 2006 to 2010. They participated on the second American series of I'm a Celebrity...Get Me Out of Here! (with former housemates Stephen Baldwin, Daniel Baldwin and Janice Dickinson). They entered the house as "All stars" on Day 1 having previously competed in Celebrity Big Brother 11, finishing as runners-up behind Rylan Clark. On Day 18, they were chosen to receive eternal nomination, meaning they were to face all evictions for the remainder of the series. They became the eighth housemates to be evicted on Day 25 in a double eviction.

=== James Cosmo ===
James Cosmo is a Scottish actor known for his appearances in films including Highlander, Braveheart, Trainspotting, Troy and The Chronicles of Narnia: The Lion, the Witch and the Wardrobe, as well as television series such as Game of Thrones. He entered the house on Day 1, competing as a "new star". On Day 18, he received the most votes from his fellow housemates to receive immunity for the remainder of the series. He left the house on Day 32 finishing fourth.

=== James Jordan ===
James Jordan is an English ballroom dancer and choreographer, who had competed as one of the male professional partners on Strictly Come Dancing, from 2006 to 2013. In 2019, he won the eleventh series of Dancing On Ice. He entered the house as an "All star" on Day 1 having previously competed in Celebrity Big Brother 14, finishing in third place behind Gary Busey and Audley Harrison. He became the fourth housemate to be evicted on Day 15.

=== Jamie O'Hara ===
Jamie O'Hara is an English professional footballer. O'Hara came through Arsenal F.C. Academy to then sign for Tottenham Hotspur to become a first-team player during the 2007–08 season. He has had several loan spells, including a stint at Portsmouth that saw them reach the 2010 FA Cup Final. He was formerly married to former Miss England model and Celebrity Big Brother 5 housemate Danielle Lloyd. He entered the house on Day 1 as a "new star". He became the ninth housemate to be evicted on Day 27 through the back door following a twist during "The Final Judgement".

=== Jasmine Waltz ===
Jasmine Waltz is an American model and actress, who had minor roles in films and television shows such as Femme Fatales and Secret Girlfriend. She entered the house on Day 1 as an "All star" having competed in Celebrity Big Brother 13 and becoming the second to be evicted. She became the third housemate to be evicted on Day 13 following a twist in the task 'Weekend of Hell'.

=== Jedward ===
John and Edward Grimes, known professionally as Jedward, are an Irish identical twin singing duo who rose to fame appearing as finalists on the sixth series on The X Factor. They also competed as Ireland's participation in the Eurovision Song Contest 2011 and 2012. They entered the house on Day 4 as "All stars" having previously competed in Celebrity Big Brother 8, finishing in third place behind Paddy Doherty and Kerry Katona. They left the house on Day 32 as the runners-up.

=== Jessica Cunningham ===
Jessica Cunningham is an English businesswoman, actress, model and media personality who appeared on the twelfth series of The Apprentice in 2016, making it to the semi-finals before being fired. She entered the house on Day 11 as a "New star" as part of the 'Weekend from Hell' twist. She became the seventh housemate to be evicted on Day 25.

=== Kim Woodburn ===
Kim Woodburn was a British television presenter and expert cleaner. She is best known for her television programme How Clean Is Your House? alongside Aggie MacKenzie. She finished as runner-up on the ninth series of I'm a Celebrity...Get Me Out of Here! (with former housemates Katie Price and Samantha Fox). Kim briefly entered the Big Brother 12 house in 2011 to take part in a cleaning task. She entered the house on Day 11 as a "New star" as part of the 'Weekend from Hell' twist. She left the house on Day 32 in third place. She died on 16 June 2025 following a short illness.

=== Nicola McLean ===
Nicola McLean is an English glamour model and media personality. She finished in sixth place on the eighth series of I'm a Celebrity...Get Me Out of Here!. She entered on Day 1 as an "All Star" having previously competed in Celebrity Big Brother 9 and becoming the sixth to be evicted. She left the house on Day 32 finishing in fifth place.

=== Ray J ===
William Ray Norwood Jr. known by his stage name Ray J, is an American singer, songwriter, television personality and actor, who has had two top 20 singles in the UK ("Another Day in Paradise" - a duet with his sister Brandy - and "One Wish"). He is the first cousin of rapper Snoop Dogg. In February 2007, a pornographic home video he made with his then-girlfriend Kim Kardashian in 2003 was made public. He entered the house as a "new star" on Day 1. On Day 8, Ray J walked from the house.

=== Stacy Francis ===
Stacy Francis is an American singer and actress, best known for being a part of the girl group Ex Girlfriend and as a contestant in the first season of The X Factor USA. Francis was also a cast member on reality series R&B Divas: Los Angeles and had a well publicised argument with singer Whitney Houston two days before her death over fellow housemate Ray J. On Day 1 she entered the house to compete as a "new star" where she became the first housemate to be "edited out" of the show during the launch night twist. She became the sixth housemate to be evicted on Day 22.

== Nominations table ==
	Day 6	Day 13	Day 14	Day 17	Day 20	Day 22	Day 25	Day 32 Final		Nominations received
Coleen	Ray J, Angie	No nominations	Jedward, Jamie	Chose not to nominate	Kim, Jedward	Jessica	Jedward, Kim	Winner (Day 32)		3
Jedward	Austin, Jasmine	No nominations	James J, Nicola	Failed to nominate	Stacy, Nicola	Bianca	Nicola, Calum	Runners-up (Day 32)		22
Kim	Not in House	No nominations	Nicola, Bianca	Chose not to nominate	Stacy, Nicola	Not eligible	Nicola, Jamie	Third place (Day 32)		15
James C	Not eligible	No nominations	Jedward, Heidi & Spencer	Chose not to nominate	Kim, Jedward	Not eligible	Jedward, Kim	Fourth place (Day 32)		6
Nicola	Ray J, Angie	No nominations	Jedward, James C	Jedward	Kim, Jedward	Jedward	Kim, Jedward	Fifth place (Day 32)		7
Bianca	Not eligible	No nominations	Jedward, James C	Chose not to nominate	Kim, Jedward	Not eligible	Jedward, Kim	Sixth place (Day 32)		3
Calum	Stacy, Heidi & Spencer	No nominations	James J, Jedward	Kim	Kim, Jedward	Not eligible	Kim, Jedward	Evicted (Day 29)		2
Jamie	James J, Stacy	No nominations	Jedward, James J	Coleen	Kim, Jessica	Not eligible	Kim, Jedward	Evicted (Day 27)		4
Heidi & Spencer	Austin, Bianca	No nominations	James C, Jamie	Chose not to nominate	Coleen, Nicola	Kim	Evicted (Day 25)			4
Jessica	Not in House	No nominations	Coleen, James C	Chose not to nominate	Stacy, Jamie	Not eligible	Evicted (Day 25)			3
Stacy	Not eligible	No nominations	Jedward, James C	Chloe	Jessica, Kim	Evicted (Day 22)				8
Chloe	Not in House	No nominations	Jedward, James C	Chose not to nominate	Evicted (Day 18)					1
James J	Stacy, Austin	No nominations	Jedward, Calum	Evicted (Day 15)						4
Jasmine	Stacy, Brandon	No nominations	Evicted (Day 13)							1
Austin	Stacy, Heidi & Spencer	Evicted (Day 11)								4
Angie	Heidi & Spencer, Austin	Evicted (Day 11)								2
Brandon	Not eligible	Walked (Day 9)								1
Ray J	Not eligible	Walked (Day 8)								2
Notes	1, 2	3	4, 5	6	7, 8	7, 9	4, 8	10		
Against public vote	Angie, Austin, Heidi & Spencer, James C, ~~Ray J~~, Stacy	none	James C, James J, Jedward	Chloe, Coleen, Jedward, Kim	Coleen, Heidi & Spencer, Jamie, Jedward, Jessica, Kim, Nicola, Stacy	Bianca, Heidi & Spencer, Jedward, Jessica, Kim	Calum, Jamie, Jedward, Kim, Nicola	Bianca, Calum, Coleen, James C, Jedward, Kim, Nicola		
Walked	Ray J, Brandon	none								
Evicted	Angie; Fewest votes to save	Jasmine; Housemates' choice (out of 3) to evict	James J Fewest votes to save	Chloe; Fewest votes to save	Stacy; Fewest votes to save	Jessica; Fewest votes to save	Jamie; Fewest votes to save	Calum; 1.3% (out of 7)	Bianca; 4.36% (out of 6)	
Evicted	Angie; Fewest votes to save	Jasmine; Housemates' choice (out of 3) to evict	James J Fewest votes to save	Chloe; Fewest votes to save	Stacy; Fewest votes to save	Jessica; Fewest votes to save	Jamie; Fewest votes to save	Nicola; 6.94% (out of 5)	James C 10.33% (out of 4)	
Evicted	Austin; Housemates' choice as most dull	Jasmine; Housemates' choice (out of 3) to evict	James J Fewest votes to save	Chloe; Fewest votes to save	Stacy; Fewest votes to save	Heidi & Spencer; Fewest votes to save	Jamie; Fewest votes to save	Kim; 14.52% (out of 3)	Jedward; 29.91% (out of 2)	
Evicted	Austin; Housemates' choice as most dull	Jasmine; Housemates' choice (out of 3) to evict	James J Fewest votes to save	Chloe; Fewest votes to save	Stacy; Fewest votes to save	Heidi & Spencer; Fewest votes to save	Jamie; Fewest votes to save	Coleen; 32.65% to win		

Notes

- ^Note 1: On Day 1, the All Stars became producers and had to choose the New Stars that they found to be the least entertaining to become "edited out". They chose Stacy, James C, Brandon, Bianca and Ray J. On Day 4, it was revealed that these housemates would not be eligible to nominate during the first round of nominations but could still be nominated. As well as this, Angie and Jamie were tasked to save four of "edited out" housemates from eviction leaving one remaining. As James C remained, he automatically faces the first eviction. As late arrivals into the house Jedward were immune from being nominated this week.
- ^Note 2: Shortly after Angie's eviction and arrival of Chloe, Jessica and Kim on Day 11, the housemates voted for who they thought was the most "dull", unaware of the fact that whoever receives the most votes will be evicted. Austin received the most votes, and was immediately evicted from the house.
- ^Note 3: After Austin's eviction, there was a flash vote on the Big Brother app and website for six housemates that would be sent to Hell. Coleen, Heidi & Spencer, James J, Jasmine, Jedward and Stacy received the most votes and were sent to Hell. On Day 12 and 13 the Hell housemates competed to return to the Main House with Jedward and James J winning back their place, however they had to choose a housemate to replace them (Chloe, Jessica and Kim were exempt as new housemates). They chose James C and Calum respectively. Calum, Coleen and Stacy won their place back in their house and the housemates had to choose to evict Heidi & Spencer, James C or Jasmine. They chose Jasmine.
- ^Note 4: These nominations were face-to-face.
- ^Note 5: As new arrivals, Chloe, Jessica and Kim were immune from being nominated.
- ^Note 6: As part of this week's shopping task, Superheroes were paired up with Sidekicks. Nicola was paired with Jedward, Bianca with Heidi & Spencer, Jamie was with Coleen, Calum with Kim, Chloe with Stacy and James C was paired with Jessica. For end of task nominations the pairs were given a buzzer and thirty seconds to press it. If the sidekick pushed their button and their hero did not, the sidekick would receive immunity and their hero would face eviction, and vice versa. If both pushed their buttons, the first press would count – and if neither pressed, both would be safe from eviction.
- ^Note 7: Housemates voted for a housemate of their choice to be awarded eternal immunity from being nominated. James C received the most votes and therefore was awarded eternal immunity, with this he had to choose a housemate to face the public vote each eviction. He chose Heidi and Spencer.
- ^Note 8: Every housemate who received a nomination faced eviction.
- ^Note 9: Shortly after Stacy's eviction, the housemates took part in face-to-face nominations with a twist. Each housemate had to pick a card at random. If they picked the "Joker" card then they received no power, if they picked "Nominate" then they would have to nominate a housemate who was not already saved. If they picked "Save" they would have to give immunity to a housemate who had not already been nominated. The two housemates with the fewest votes were evicted in a surprise double eviction.
- ^Note 10: The public were voting to win rather than to save. The vote was frozen on Day 29, and Calum was evicted with the fewest votes. The voting percentages reflect the overall share of the final vote, and do not account for voting freezes. Coleen won with 52.19% of the vote over Jedward.

== Summary ==
Day 1	Entrances	Heidi & Spencer, James J, Jasmine, Ray J, Bianca, Austin, Coleen, James C, Stacy, Brandon, Nicola, Jamie, Calum and Angie entered the house.
Day 1	Twists	The All star housemates were given the task of becoming the producers of the show where they were able to "edit out" certain New stars and exclude them from key moments in the show, make them wear beige and isolate them from the other housemates. Their first choice was Stacy, and their second choice was James C.
Day 2	Twists	The All stars were tasked to choose another New star to edit out of the show. After interviewing them one by one to decide who was the least entertaining, they decided to edit out Brandon.
Day 3	Twists	After an improvisation task, the All stars were told to choose two more New stars to edit out of the show. They chose Bianca and Ray J leaving Angie and Jamie as "Stars of the Show".
Day 4	Twists	It was revealed that the edited out housemates would not be able to nominate during the first round of nominations but could still be nominated. It was also up to Angie and Jamie to decide which of the "edited out" housemates would face the first eviction. After saving Bianca, Brandon, Ray J and Stacy this left James C meaning he would automatically face the first public vote.
Day 4	Entrances	Jedward entered the house.
Day 4	Exits	Edward temporarily left the house to receive medical attention after taking a fall on the way into the house.
Day 5	Tasks	All housemates except Bianca were told that a series of unusual events would occur throughout the day - all the housemates had to do was ensure that Bianca was oblivious to all the goings-on.
Day 6	Nominations	Everyone except the edited out housemates nominated for the first time. As new housemates, Jedward were immune. As Angie, Austin, Heidi & Spencer, Ray J and Stacy received the most nominations, they join James C up for eviction.
Day 7	Tasks	Angie was tasked to run a detox programme for five housemates: Brandon, Calum, Coleen, James C and Ray J. These housemates were told to eat healthy as well as complete yoga and exercise routines. Cigarettes and alcohol were also confiscated.
Day 8	Tasks	The housemates received their first shopping task, "Land of Nod". Apart from James J and Nicola who were part of the "Dream Team", the housemates were not allowed to sleep or lie down during the day, yawn or make references to being tired, or use any hot water or beauty products. The housemates also had to complete a number of time or sleep related mini-tasks.
Day 8	Exits	Ray J walked from the house on medical grounds.
Day 9	Exits	Brandon walked from the house.
Day 11	Exits	Angie became the first housemate to be evicted.; Austin became the second housemate to be evicted. (See twists)
Day 11	Entrances	Chloe, Jessica and Kim entered the house.
Day 11	Twists	Housemates were told that their "Weekend From Hell" had begun and their first task was to vote for who they believed was the most dull. Austin received the most votes, and in a twist became the next housemate to be evicted. Coleen, Heidi & Spencer, James J, Jasmine, Jedward and Stacy were then sent to "Hell".
Day 12	Tasks	After winning a task to guess what the other housemates thought of them, Jedward freed themselves from Hell and had to choose a housemate from the main house to replace them. They chose James C. James J then freed himself from Hell, and chose Calum to be his replacement.
Day 13	Exits	Jasmine became the third housemate to be evicted. (See twists)
Day 13	Twists	Calum, Coleen and Stacy freed themselves from Hell, leaving Heidi & Spencer, James C and Jasmine. The housemates in the Main House had to decide which of the three housemates remaining in Hell to evict. They chose Jasmine.
Day 14	Nominations	Housemates nominated face-to-face. As new housemates, Chloe, Jessica and Kim were immune. James C, James J and Jedward received the most nominations, they faced the next eviction.
Day 15	Exits	James J became the fourth housemate to be evicted.
Day 16	Tasks	For this week's shopping task, the housemates were split into Superheroes; Coleen, Heidi & Spencer, Jedward, Jessica, Kim and Stacy, and Sidekicks; Bianca, Calum, Chloe, James C, Jamie and Nicola. The Sidekicks had to serve and compliment their Superheroes as well as taking part in mini-tasks were they learnt how to fly through tough conditions and developed a truth serum by being honest.
Day 16	Punishments	James C refused to wear the costume that was provided for the task so the hot water was turned off until further notice.
Day 17	Nominations	The shopping task continued, but with a nominations twist. The pairs were given a buzzer and thirty seconds to press it. If the sidekick pushed their button and their hero did not, the sidekick would receive immunity and their hero would face eviction, and vice versa. If both pushed their buttons, only the first press would count – and if neither pressed, both would be safe from eviction. Following this twist, Chloe, Coleen, Jedward and Kim faced eviction.
Day 18	Exits	Chloe became the fifth housemate to be evicted.
Day 18	Twists	Housemates had to choose face-to-face who they thought deserved eternal immunity. James C received the most votes. However, James C had to decide which housemate should be eternally nominated, and as a result would face every eviction until they leave or reach the final. He chose Heidi & Spencer.
Day 19	Tasks	Housemates took part in "Housemate Bingo". Leaving the board would mean entering the Ballroom Party. Housemates in the Ballroom Party were provided with entertainment and could choose which housemates joined them by picking their number. However, the party ended when the last housemates left the board.
Day 20	Nominations	Before nominating housemates were unaware that receiving just one nomination would result in their facing eviction. As Coleen, Jamie, Jedward, Jessica, Kim, Nicola and Stacy all received a nomination, they joined Heidi & Spencer in facing the next eviction.
Day 21	Tasks	In a public poll, the viewers rated Kim and Stacy the "most judgemental". The other housemates were told to line up from 'Most' to 'Least' in a particular trait with Kim and Stacy deciding what that trait was. An incorrect answer would result in an electric shock.
Day 22	Exits	Stacy became the sixth housemate to be evicted.
Day 22	Nominations	Shortly after Stacy's eviction, the housemates took part in face-to-face nominations with a twist. Each housemate had to pick a card at random. If they picked the "Joker" card then they received no power, if they picked "Nominate" then they would have to nominate a housemate who was not already saved. If they picked "Save" they would have to give immunity to a housemate who had not already been nominated.
Day 23	Tasks	For this week's shopping task housemates had to leave the task room without disturbing any of the provided items, which were temptations from family and friends. These included Jedward's friend and Celebrity Big Brother 8 housemate Tara Reid, and Spencer's sister and Celebrity Big Brother 14 housemate Stephanie Pratt.
Day 24	Tasks	Housemates were split into two teams, where one by one each team had to answer a question about their fellow housemates. The answer was on a loaf of bread, which they had to search for in a room full of bread rolls.
Day 25	Tasks	Following the housemate's decision that Heidi & Spencer were the weakest housemates, they were given a letter from home and were chosen to begin today's task by deciding which housemate would not receive their letter from home. That housemate would then choose another housemate to receive their letter. This pattern followed until all housemates had taken part.
Day 25	Exits	Jessica became the seventh housemate to be evicted.; Heidi & Spencer became the eighth housemates to be evicted.
Day 25	Nominations	Shortly after the double eviction, housemates nominated face-to-face. As Calum, Jamie, Jedward, Kim and Nicola received at least one nomination they all faced the next eviction.
Day 26	Tasks	The "Final Judgement" began with Celebrity Big Brother 1 and Ultimate Big Brother housemate Vanessa Feltz entering the house to lead a task where other guests would enter to judge the housemates. These included Celebrity Big Brother 3 and Ultimate Big Brother housemate John McCririck, Celebrity Big Brother 13 housemate Luisa Zissman, Celebrity Big Brother 18 housemate Saira Khan and ex-housemate Austin.
Day 27	Exits	Jamie became the ninth housemate to be evicted.
Day 28	Tasks	James C and Kim were given a secret task to cause as much disruption as possible. They were unaware that they had been set the same task.
Day 29	Tasks	Jedward and Nicola were made part of a rock band with the other housemates becoming their roadies. After the roadies auditioned, they chose Coleen to join the band.; Shortly after Calum's eviction, housemates voted in the awards ceremony in a number of categories. The Housemates watched a number of videos of themselves before deciding who should win each award. One award "Lifetime Underachievement Award", voted for by the public, was won by James C.
Day 29	Exits	Calum became the tenth housemate to be evicted.
Day 30	Tasks	Housemates took part in mini tasks to make up "CBB TV" including Jedward and Bianca's shopping channel, a quiz show with the housemates answering questions about each other, and James C's story time.
Day 32	Exits	Bianca left the house in sixth place, followed by Nicola in fifth, James C in fourth then Kim in third. Coleen was then announced as the winner, meaning Jedward had finished as the runners-up.

== Production ==
=== Eye logo ===
On 5 December 2016, Willis released the new official eye logo for the series featuring a pop-art themed, comic style teaser with "Pop goes January" as the slogan.

=== Teasers ===
On 17 December 2016, the official 30 second trailer was released with Willis and Clark-Neal. From 20 December, the new housemates were teased on the official Facebook page, the official Twitter and on the Big Brother app.

=== House ===
Pictures of the new house were revealed on 29 December 2016 by Clark-Neal and the official app. It is heavily inspired by pop art.

== Ratings ==
Official ratings are taken from BARB.

	Official viewers (millions)				
	Week 1	Week 2	Week 3	Week 4	Week 5
Saturday		1.85	2.12	2.08	2.10
Sunday		2.14	2.39	2.60	2.66
Monday		2.25	2.46	2.69	2.52
Tuesday	2.77	2.20	2.44	2.53	2.30
Wednesday	2.48	2.25	2.79	2.32	2.40
Thursday	2.55	2.41	2.74	2.63	2.59
Friday	2.00	2.32	2.43	2.18	2.56
Friday	2.09	2.15	2.29	2.03	2.56
Weekly average	2.38	2.20	2.46	2.38	2.45
Running average	2.38	2.29	2.35	2.36	2.37
Series average	2.4				
blue-coloured boxes denote live shows.
