= St Wilfrid's Church of England Academy =

Location
- Duckworth Street; Blackburn; Lancashire, BB2 2JR; England
- Coordinates: 53.74264°N 2.49406°W

Information
- Type: Academy
- Religious affiliation: Church of England
- Local authority: Blackburn with Darwen
- Department for Education URN: 136900 Tables
- Ofsted: Reports
- Principal: Vicki Michael
- Gender: Mixed
- Age: 11 to 18
- Colours: Blue and yellow
- Website: http://www.saintwilfrids.co.uk/

St Wilfrid's Church of England Academy (formerly St Wilfrid's Church of England High School) is a mixed secondary school and sixth form located in Blackburn in the English county of Lancashire. It is named after Saint Wilfrid, a former archbishop of Canterbury. Originally located over two sites on Duckworth and Byrom Streets, construction of a new combined campus on Duckworth Street began in December 2001 and was completed in January 2004.

Previously a voluntary aided school administered by Blackburn with Darwen Borough Council and the Church of England Diocese of Blackburn, St Wilfrid's Church of England High School achieved academy status in July 2011, and was renamed St Wilfrid's Church of England Academy.

The school is now independent of local authority, but still administered by the diocese. It continues to coordinate with Blackburn with Darwen Borough Council for admissions.

The Apprentice UK contender and Celebrity Big Brother 19 housemate Jessica Cunningham attended St Wilfrid's after switching from private School Westholme School, also in Blackburn.

Vicki Michael replaced Catherine Huddleston as principal in Summer 2022.

The school offers GCSE and BTEC programmes, while students in the sixth form may study from a range of A-levels and further BTECs.

== Notable former alumni ==
- Amy Leach (1992-1999), Olivier Award nominee theatre director
- Max Balegde (2010-2015), social media star
- Ollie Rathbone (2009-2015), a Wrexham A.F.C. footballer
