= Celebrity Big Brother (British TV series) series 15 =

2015 season of television series

Celebrity Big Brother
- Series 15
- Series fifteen logo
- Presented by: Emma Willis
- No. of days: 31
- No. of housemates: 15
- Winner: Katie Price
- Runner-up: Katie Hopkins
- Companion shows: Big Brother's on the Side
- No. of episodes: 32

Release
- Original network: Channel 5
- Original release: 7 January – 6 February 2015

Series chronology
- ← Previous; Series 14 Next → Series 16

Celebrity Big Brother 15 is the fifteenth series of the British reality television series Celebrity Big Brother. The series launched on 7 January 2015 on Channel 5 and ended after 31 days on 6 February 2015; at the time it was the longest ever celebrity series. The seventeenth series in 2016 lasted a day longer with 32 days. It was the eighth celebrity series and the twelfth series of Big Brother overall to air on the channel. Emma Willis returned to host the series, whilst Rylan Clark continued to present the spin-off show Celebrity Big Brother's Bit on the Side alongside Willis. Repeats of the series aired on MTV, the first to do so. Willis decided to leave Big Brother's Bit on the Side after the end of this series, hosting her final show on 2 February 2015.

On 6 February 2015, Katie Price won the series, with Katie Hopkins finishing as the runner-up. This was the first series of Celebrity Big Brother (and second overall after Ashleigh Coyle and Helen Wood in Big Brother 15) where both the runner-up and the winner were women. Price also became the first female Housemate (and second overall after Brian Belo in Big Brother 8) on any series of Big Brother or Celebrity Big Brother to win the series after entering late. Price entered the House nine days after the original fourteen Housemates, and left 21 days later as the winner.

This series was the focus of much controversy after housemates Jeremy Jackson and Ken Morley were ejected within the first week. With an average audience of 3.09 million, it was the highest-rated series of Big Brother or Celebrity Big Brother on Channel 5.

Calum Best returned to the house for Celebrity Big Brother 19 as an All-Star, representing this series. He was the tenth housemate to be evicted.

== Format ==
Celebrity Big Brother is a game show in which a group of celebrity contestants, referred to as housemates, live in isolation from the outside world in a custom built "house", constantly under video surveillance. During their time in the House, the housemates are required to nominate two of their fellow contestants for potential eviction, and the two or more with the most votes would be nominated. This process is mandatory for all housemates, and failure to comply could result in expulsion from the House. The public then vote, with one of those celebrities evicted from the house. When the final week arrives, the viewers vote for which of the remaining celebrities should win the series, and the housemate with the most votes becomes the winner.

During their time in the House, housemates are given weekly tasks to perform. The housemates wager a portion of their weekly shopping budget on the task, and either win double their wagered fund or lose the wagered fund depending on their performance in the task. The housemates are required to work as a group to complete their tasks, with the format of the tasks varying based on the number of remaining housemates. Throughout the series, some housemates have been given secret tasks that must either be completed individually or with a small group; failure to do so can result in the housemate being nominated or punished in the House. Should the housemates run out of the food provided for them, an emergency ration was available to them. The housemates are forbidden from discussing nominations, and doing so could result in punishment. The format of the series is mainly seen as a social experiment, and requires housemates to interact with others who may have differing ideals, beliefs, and prejudices. Housemates are also required to make visits to the Diary Room during their stay in the House, where they are able to share their thoughts and feelings on their fellow housemates and the game.

== Housemates ==
Celebrity	Age on entry	Notability	Day entered	Day exited	Status
Katie Price	36	TV personality and glamour model	10	31	Winner
Katie Hopkins	39	TV personality and columnist	1	31	Runner-up
Calum Best	33	Model and TV personality	1	31	3rd place
Keith Chegwin †	57	Actor and presenter	1	31	4th place
Michelle Visage	46	Singer and presenter	1	31	5th place
Perez Hilton	36	Blogger and TV personality	1	29	Evicted
Kavana	37	Singer	1	29	Evicted
Cami-Li	28	Model	1	27	Evicted
Nadia Sawalha	50	Actress and presenter	1	24	Evicted
Patsy Kensit	46	Actress	1	21	Evicted
Alicia Douvall	35	Media personality	1	17	Evicted
Alexander O'Neal	61	Singer	1	11	Walked
Chloe Goodman	21	Reality TV star	1	10	Evicted
Ken Morley	71	Actor	1	6	Ejected
Jeremy Jackson	34	Actor	1	4	Ejected

=== Alexander O'Neal ===
Alexander O'Neal is an American singer, best known for his internationally chart-topping singles such as "If You Were Here Tonight", "Fake" and "Criticize". He is also known for his duets with Cherelle on "Saturday Love" and "Never Knew Love Like This". In the United Kingdom, he appeared on a number of reality television shows including The Weakest Link, Just the Two of Us and Celebrity Wife Swap. He entered the House on Day 1, but as part of the launch night twist, he was automatically nominated for the first eviction. On Day 11, Alexander decided to walk from the Big Brother house, following an argument with Perez Hilton.

=== Alicia Douvall ===
Alicia Douvall (born Sarah Howes) is a British glamour model, businesswoman, actress, and television personality. She is the founder and owner of Douvall's skincare company. She entered the House on Day 1. On Day 17, Alicia became the second housemate to be evicted.

=== Calum Best ===
Calum Best is a British-American former fashion model, television personality, and occasional actor. He is also known as the son of the late football icon, George Best and former Playboy model, Angie Best. He won the second series of Celebrity Love Island in 2006, and appeared in the ITV2 series Calum, Fran and Dangerous Danan, with Fran Cosgrave and Paul Danan. He was also featured in the MTV show Totally Calum Best, where it detailed Best's attempts to remain celibate for fifty days. Best has been romantically involved with Lindsay Lohan, Celebrity Big Brother 9 housemate Georgia Salpa and Alicia Douvall. On Day 1, Calum entered the House. On Day 31, Calum left the house in third place. He later returned to compete in Celebrity Big Brother 19 as an "All star" housemate.

=== Cami-Li ===
Cami-Li (born Camila Figueras) is a Puerto Rican-born American alternative model and television host, best known in the UK for her previous relationship with former The Only Way Is Essex star and Celebrity Big Brother 9 housemate Kirk Norcross. On Day 1, she entered the House. On Day 27, she was evicted during a live twist.

=== Chloe Goodman ===
Chloe Goodman is a British reality television star and model, who was featured as a cast member on the first series of MTV's Ex on the Beach. Goodman is also most notable for being a body double for Cheryl Fernandez-Versini in her L'Oreal adverts. She entered the House on Day 1, but was automatically nominated for the first eviction during the launch night twist. On Day 10, she became the first person to be evicted from the House.

=== Jeremy Jackson ===
Jeremy Jackson is an American actor and singer, who is most known for his role as Hobie Buchannon on the television show Baywatch. He appeared on the VH1 reality series Confessions of a Teen Idol, which chronicled the current careers of seven former teen idols (including Jackson), and their attempts to get back in front of the spotlight. On Day 1, Jeremy entered the House. He was ejected from the House on Day 4, due to an incident with Chloe Goodman in the toilet, the night before.

=== Katie Hopkins ===
Katie Hopkins is an English television personality and columnist, who first appeared on the third series of The Apprentice. On the show, she made herself memorable to viewers for her controversial and personal remarks towards the other candidates, despite turning down a place in the series final. She later took part in I'm a Celebrity...Get Me Out of Here!, as a replacement for Malcolm McLaren, and has since made various other media appearances. Her controversy spread further in the media with her opinions on classism, obesity, the unemployed, celebrities, and the Ebola virus. Hopkins currently writes a weekly column for The Sun newspaper. She was reportedly offered a record fee to appear on the show. On Day 1, Katie became the first to enter the House and was the subject of the launch night twist, selecting two of her fellow Housemates as the least entertaining. She chose Alexander and Chloe, who were therefore nominated for the first eviction. Due to her epilepsy, she also had her own bedroom in the house with ensuite bathroom. On Day 31, Hopkins was announced as the runner up of the series, behind Katie Price.

=== Katie Price ===
Katie Price, previously known by the pseudonym Jordan, is an English singer, television personality, novelist, businesswoman, and former glamour model. Her time as a topless glamour model in a pictorial Page 3 in the tabloid newspaper The Sun instantly shot Price into the limelight. From this, it allowed her to expand into a variety of different industries including television, books, fashion and music. She has had highly publicised relationships and has been married three times: to singer Peter Andre, to professional fighter and previous Celebrity Big Brother winner Alex Reid, and to builder and part-time stripper Kieran Hayler. She entered the House on Day 10, to a ball thrown in her honour. On Day 31, Price was announced as the winner of the series.

=== Kavana ===
Kavana (born Anthony Kavanagh) is a British singer and actor, who enjoyed a number of chart singles including "I Can Make You Feel Good", "MFEO" and "Will You Wait for Me?". He was the runner-up on the first series of Grease Is the Word, and auditioned for The Voice UK in 2013. In 2014, Kavana took part in series 2 of The Big Reunion with Gareth Gates, Adam Rickitt and previous Celebrity Big Brother contestants Kenzie and Dane Bowers, where they formed the supergroup 5th Story. He entered the House on Day 1. Kavana was evicted in a double eviction on Day 29, two days from the final.

=== Keith Chegwin ===
Keith Chegwin was an English television presenter and actor, who had become a household name by presenting programmes such as Multicoloured Swap Shop, Cheggers Plays Pop and Saturday Superstore. Chegwin is known for his off the cuff ad-lib style of broadcasting. His career regained speed in 1993, when he presented the "Down Your Doorstep" outside broadcast segment for The Big Breakfast, in which he cried: "Wake up you beggars, it's Cheggars!". He also worked for seven years on GMTV, and took part in Dancing on Ice. Keith entered the House on Day 1. On Day 31, he left the house in fourth place. He died on 11 December 2017.

=== Ken Morley ===
Ken Morley is an English actor and comedian, best known for playing the roles of Reg Holdsworth in the ITV soap opera Coronation Street from 1989 to 1995, and as General Leopold von Flockenstuffen in the BBC sitcom 'Allo 'Allo! from 1988 to 1991. Ken entered the House on Day 1. On Day 4, Ken received a formal warning for using unacceptable and offensive language and on Day 6, he was removed from the House for repeatedly using this language.

=== Michelle Visage ===
Michelle Visage (born Michelle Lynn Shupack) is an American singer, television host, radio DJ, and television personality, best known for being one of the judges on Logo TV's RuPaul's Drag Race, where she replaced Merle Ginsberg from its third season. She is also known as a member of U.S. female R&B and dance vocal trio Seduction, who spanned several hit songs including "Two to Make It Right". Visage provided vocals for The S.O.U.L. S.Y.S.T.E.M.'s "It's Gonna Be a Lovely Day", which was included on The Bodyguard soundtrack. She entered the House on Day 1. On Day 31, she left the house in fifth place.

=== Nadia Sawalha ===
Nadia Sawalha is an English actress and television presenter, best known for her role as businesswoman Annie Palmer in the BBC One soap opera, EastEnders from 1997 to 1999. She became a regular panellist on the ITV lunchtime chat show Loose Women from 1999 to 2002; before returning in 2013. After winning the second series of Celebrity MasterChef, Sawalha has continued to make appearances on cookery shows, not only as a presenter, but also as a chef. On Day 1, Nadia entered the House. On Day 24, she became the fourth housemate to be evicted.

=== Patsy Kensit ===
Patsy Kensit is an English actress, singer, and model, who is best known for portraying the roles of Sadie King in Emmerdale from 2004 to 2006, and Faye Byrne in the BBC medical drama series Holby City from 2007 until 2010. She also played Rika van den Hass in Lethal Weapon 2. Aside from her acting career, Kensit has been notable for her marriages to musicians Dan Donovan, Jim Kerr, Liam Gallagher and Jeremy Healy, but also as the front vocalist in the band, Eighth Wonder. She entered the House on Day 1. She became the third housemate to be evicted from the house on Day 21.

=== Perez Hilton ===
Mario Lavandeira, Jr., known professionally as Perez Hilton (a play on "Paris Hilton"), is an American blogger, social media influencer, columnist, and television personality. His blog, Perezhilton.com (formerly PageSixSixSix.com), is known for its posts covering celebrity gossip and showcasing tabloid photographs, over which he adds his own captions or "doodles". The website has garnered negative attention for its attitude, its former outing of alleged closeted celebrities, and its role in the increasing coverage of celebrities in all forms of media. From this, he has had celebrity feuds with Lady Gaga, Lily Allen and will.i.am. On Day 1, Perez entered the House. His time in the house had garnered much media attention, due to his controversial behaviour towards fellow housemates and his provocative antics. On Day 29, he was evicted in a double eviction.

== Nominations table ==
	Day 3	Day 8	Day 11	Day 19	Day 22	Day 26	Day 31 Final		Nominations received
Katie P	Not in House		Calum	Patsy, Cami-Li	Katie H, Calum	Katie H, Kavana	Winner (Day 31)		6
Katie H	Perez	Not eligible	Perez, Nadia	Patsy, Katie P	Katie P, Keith	Keith, Katie P	Runner-up (Day 31)		12
Calum	Ken	Not eligible	Perez, Alicia	Nadia, Patsy	Nadia, Keith	Katie P, Keith	Third place (Day 31)		4
Keith	Perez	Not eligible	~~Alexander~~; Perez, Kavana	Patsy, Kavana	Katie H, Kavana	Cami-Li, Kavana	Fourth place (Day 31)		10
Michelle	Ken	Not eligible	Perez, Alicia	Patsy, Nadia	Nadia, Keith	Keith, Katie P	Fifth place (Day 31)		2
Perez	Ken	Chloe, Michelle	Katie H, Cami-Li	Cami-Li	Katie H, Cami-Li	Cami-Li, Katie H	Evicted (Day 29)		10
Kavana	Ken	Not eligible	Perez, Nadia	Patsy, Nadia	Nadia, Keith	Keith, Cami-Li	Evicted (Day 29)		5
Cami-Li	Ken	Alexander, Alicia	Alicia, Perez	Patsy, Nadia	Nadia, Keith	Keith, Katie P	Evicted (Day 27)		9
Nadia	Katie H	Not eligible	Katie H, ~~Alexander~~, Michelle	Katie H, Patsy	Katie H, Calum	Evicted (Day 24)			12
Patsy	Ken	Not eligible	Perez, Nadia	Katie H, Nadia	Evicted (Day 21)				9
Alicia	Calum	Not eligible	Cami-Li, Katie H	Evicted (Day 17)					4
Alexander	Perez	Not eligible	Walked (Day 11)						3
Chloe	Ken	Not eligible	Evicted (Day 10)						1
Ken	Cami-Li	Ejected (Day 6)							7
Jeremy	Patsy	Ejected (Day 4)							0
Notes	1	2	3	4	5	6	7		
Against public vote	Alexander, Chloe, Ken	Alexander, Alicia, Chloe, Michelle	Alicia, Calum, Nadia, Perez	Cami-Li, Katie H, Nadia, Patsy	Katie H, Keith, Nadia, Perez	Cami-Li, Katie P, Keith, Perez	Calum, Katie H, Katie P, Kavana, Keith, Michelle, Perez		
Walked	none		Alexander	none					
Ejected	Jeremy, Ken	none							
Evicted	Eviction cancelled	Chloe; Fewest votes (out of 2) to save	Alicia; Fewest votes to save	Patsy; Fewest votes to save	Nadia; Fewest votes to save	Cami-Li; Fewest votes to save	Kavana; Fewest votes (out of 7)	Perez; Fewest votes (out of 7)	
Evicted	Eviction cancelled	Chloe; Fewest votes (out of 2) to save	Alicia; Fewest votes to save	Patsy; Fewest votes to save	Nadia; Fewest votes to save	Cami-Li; Fewest votes to save	Michelle; Fewest votes (out of 5)	Keith; Fewest votes (out of 4)	
Evicted	Eviction cancelled	Chloe; Fewest votes (out of 2) to save	Alicia; Fewest votes to save	Patsy; Fewest votes to save	Nadia; Fewest votes to save	Cami-Li; Fewest votes to save	Calum; Fewest votes (out of 3)	Katie H Fewest votes (out of 2)	
Evicted	Eviction cancelled	Chloe; Fewest votes (out of 2) to save	Alicia; Fewest votes to save	Patsy; Fewest votes to save	Nadia; Fewest votes to save	Cami-Li; Fewest votes to save	Katie P Most votes to win		

Notes

- ^Note 1: On Day 1, shortly after entering the House, Katie H was given a secret mission by "The Enchanted Mirror". She had to select two of her fellow Housemates who she thought was the least entertaining. Unbeknownst to her, they would then automatically face the first eviction. She chose Alexander and Chloe. On Day 3, Housemates nominated face to face, with each Housemate nominating only one person as opposed to the usual two. Following Ken's ejection on Day 6, the live eviction scheduled to take place on Day 7 was cancelled.
- ^Note 2: On Day 7, following a twist, Cami-Li was made Queen of the Fairies and was told she was immune from the next eviction and that she'd be able to give immunity to other housemates. That night, she selected Perez as King of the Fairies, granting him immunity. On Day 8, they chose to give immunity to Keith and Nadia through a task. The same day, Cami-Li and Perez were asked to cast a nomination curse on four of the remaining housemates. These four Housemates would face eviction on Day 10. Perez chose Chloe and Michelle, while Cami-Li chose Alexander and Alicia.
- ^Note 3: Alicia, Katie H, Nadia, and Perez were initially nominated for an eviction due to take place on Day 14, but it was postponed to Day 17, due to Alexander's voluntary departure. As Alexander walked during the nomination process, all nominations for him became invalid and any housemates who nominated him had to later choose a replacement nominee. Keith and Nadia originally nominated Alexander but replaced their nominations with Kavana and Michelle, respectively. While Katie P was not able to be nominated as she was a new housemate, as part of the live twist that replaced Day 14's planned eviction, she had to save one nominated housemate and replace them with another who she thought was the least entertaining. She saved Katie H and replaced her with Calum, claiming that she assumed he would be saved by the public.
- ^Note 4: Shortly before nominations took place Perez staged a fake walk out and moved into a secret room. As Perez was living in the secret room he was not able to be nominated, however, he was able to cast one tie-breaker nomination vote to either Cami-Li, Katie P and Kavana as they had received one vote each. He chose Cami-Li.
- ^Note 5: Shortly after Patsy's eviction on Day 21, Perez returned to the house and viewers had been voting via the official app since Day 20 on whether he should "be blessed with a pass to the final" or "cursed with eternal nomination". It was revealed that he would be eternally nominated for every eviction for the rest of the series. On Day 22, Housemates nominated face-to-face.
- ^Note 6: On Day 27, the voting lines were open for approximately an hour during the live show for a surprise instant eviction. As Perez had received "eternal nomination" he was automatically nominated.
- ^Note 7: This was a to win rather than to save, and the two Housemate with the fewest votes were evicted on Day 29. The voting lines then reopened for the remaining Housemates until the final.

== Summary ==
Day 1	Entrances	Katie H, Patsy, Perez, Ken, Cami-Li, Calum, Alicia, Alexander, Nadia, Jeremy, Kavana, Michelle, Chloe and Keith entered the House.
Day 1	Twists	Katie H entered the House first, but was instructed by "The Enchanted Mirror" to hide inside it and give her opinions on all of her other Housemates as they enter. She then chose who she thought were the two least entertaining Housemates; Alexander and Chloe, then re-entered the House as the last Housemate. The Enchanted Mirror soon announced that Chloe and Alexander would face the first public vote.
Day 1	Tasks	Katie H was given a secret mission to adopt a positive, happy attitude only delivering positive comments to her fellow Housemates until further notice.
Day 2	Tasks	Katie H continued her secret mission. Big Brother asked her to name the three Housemates she found the least attractive. She chose Patsy, Perez, and Ken. Big Brother then asked Katie H to do a good deed and convince one of those three Housemates to give a foot massage to. She chose Perez and passed her task. Her curse of kindness was then lifted.
Day 3	Twists	Housemates nominated face to face, nominating only one other Housemate as opposed to the usual two.
Day 3	Nominations	Ken received the most nominations and therefore faced the first eviction along with Alexander and Chloe, who were previously nominated during the launch night twist.
Day 4	Tasks	Housemates participated in the Once upon a Headline task. Ken and Michelle were given the task of matching up fairy tale themed headlines with the appropriate Housemates. If they correctly matched every Housemate, they would pass the task. Ken and Michelle passed the task and won cocktails for the entire House.
Day 4	Punishments	Ken was given a formal warning by Big Brother for using racist and inappropriate language in conversations the night before.; Jeremy was removed from the House following an incident from the previous night.
Day 4	Exits	Jeremy was ejected from the House by Big Brother following an incident with Chloe from the night before. During the incident, Jeremy grabbed Chloe's robe, revealing her breast in the process.
Day 5	Tasks	Housemates participated in their first shopping task, Shopping Aid. Housemates had to complete various tasks in order to raise money for a fictional Big Brother telethon. In order to earn money for their cause, Housemates were required to continuously ride on an exercise bike. Later, they produced a music video for a charity single, led by Alexander and Kavana. Housemates were later informed that they had raised enough money during their telethon, passed the task, and would receive a luxury shopping budget.
Day 5	Punishments	Perez was given a warning for using what could be deemed as threatening behaviour towards Ken.
Day 6	Punishments	For continuing to use racist and offensive language, Ken was removed from the House.
Day 6	Exits	Ken was ejected from the House by Big Brother following a conversation he had with Keith in which he once again said negro. Following Ken's ejection, the live eviction planned for Day 7 was cancelled.
Day 7	Twists	Housemates were given a challenge to decide which one of them would automatically face the next eviction. Nadia was randomly selected to go first, and therefore would not face the next eviction. She was presented with a board with all of the Housemate's faces on it and had to choose one other Housemate to save. She chose Patsy, who then had to save the next Housemate. This process continued until only Cami-Li remained on the board. Big Brother called Cami-Li into the Diary Room to reveal the whole game was a lie. Big Brother told the Housemates that Cami-Li was named the "Queen of the Fairies". This meant that she had received immunity from the next eviction and that all other Housemates would be nominated. She was then informed that she would be able to save other Housemates in the coming days with her power.; Later that night, Cami-Li made Perez "King of the Fairies" meaning he was immune and would aid her in deciding who would be safe from the next eviction.
Day 8	Tasks	Queen Cami-Li and King Perez were tasked with choosing which two of their fellow Housemates were the most entertaining. Housemates had five minutes each to perform their talents in front of the House. After all Housemates had performed, Cami-Li and Perez chose Keith and Nadia as the most entertaining. Due to this, Keith and Nadia were appointed the Court Jesters of the house and received immunity from the next eviction.
Day 8	Nominations	Perez and Cami-Li's role of "King and Queen of the Fairies" came to end, but not before they cast a nomination curse on four of the other Housemates. Since Keith and Nadia already had immunity they were unable to choose them. Perez chose to nominate Chloe and Michelle, while Cami-Li nominated Alexander and Alicia, who all face eviction on Day 10.
Day 10	Entrances	Following Chloe's eviction, Katie P entered the House.
Day 10	Twists	Immediately after Katie P entered the House, Big Brother informed her that she had to send three other Housemates to the gilded cage for the night. She chose Perez, Cami-Li, and Nadia.
Day 10	Punishments	Alexander was given a formal warning by Big Brother for his use of offensive language towards Perez.
Day 10	Exits	Chloe became the first Housemate to be evicted after receiving the fewest votes to save.
Day 11	Nominations	Housemates nominated for the second time, this time in the Diary Room. As Alexander decided to leave the house during the nominations process, all nominations he had received were voided and the Housemates who nominated him had to choose another. Alicia, Katie H, Nadia, and Perez received the most nominations.
Day 11	Exits	Alexander voluntarily left the House following an ongoing rivalry with Perez. The eviction scheduled for Day 14 was then cancelled, with nominations rolling over to the Day 17 eviction.
Day 12	Tasks	Housemates were given their second shopping task where they all became Cadets. Katie H was appointed Cadet Leader, and had to aid the other Housemates into collecting badges. If they collected enough badges by the end of the task they'd receive a luxury shopping budget. Throughout the task the Cadets had to refer to Katie H as "Red Pigeon". Their challenges included Nadia cleaning the bath with a toothbrush, Perez sitting on the naughty step, and the Housemates being brutally honest with each other. Houseates passed the shopping task.
Day 13	Punishments	As a result of Alicia and Calum discussing nominations, Housemates were told that all electrical hair appliances would be switched off until further notice.
Day 14	Tasks	Patsy was asked to lead a meditation class to four of her fellow Housemates. She chose Alicia, Calum, Cami-Li and Keith.
Day 14	Twists	Due to the eviction being cancelled, a nominations twist took place instead. Out of all the Housemates currently nominated, Katie P was asked to save the most entertaining Housemate from eviction, and replace them with another Housemate who wasn't currently nominated who she thought was the least entertaining. She chose to save Katie H and replace her with Calum; meaning Alicia, Calum, Nadia and Perez face eviction on Day 17.
Day 15	Tasks	Katie H, Michelle, Nadia and Perez were asked to lead a debate. Big Brother gave them a number of topics to discuss between.
Day 17	Exits	Alicia became the second Housemate to be evicted from the House.
Day 18	Tasks	Housemates took part in their third shopping task where the House had been hacked, and it was the Housemate's responsibility to piece together and identify who said what about who. They also had to correctly match answers voted for by the public for most entertaining, most two faced etc. Next they were shown clips of the Housemates talking about each other and had to answer questions correctly on what they had just seen. As Housemates passed two out of three of these tasks they won a luxury shopping budget.
Day 19	Twists	Perez was given a secret mission to stage a walkout. After managing to convince his fellow Housemates then escape through the fire exit, he then moved into a secret room where he could watch the Housemates.
Day 19	Nominations	The Housemates nominated for the third time. With the Housemates assuming Perez has walked, he was unable to be nominated. As Katie H, Nadia and Patsy received the most nominations they faced eviction on Day 21, however as Cami-Li, Katie P and Kavana were all tied on one nomination each, it was up to Perez to decide which one of them should also be nominated. He chose Cami-Li.
Day 20	Tasks	Katie H was called to the Diary Room to answer questions asked by the viewers, however this was a lie and the questions were actually asked by Perez, who was watching from the secret room.
Day 21	Exits	Patsy became the third Housemate to be evicted from the house.
Day 21	Twists	Perez re-entered the house and discovered that the public had been voting to decide his fate; either be rewarded with a pass to the final or be cursed with eternal nomination. He was given eternal nomination meaning he will face eviction until he goes for the rest of the series.
Day 21	Punishments	Perez was given a warning for licking Katie H's face after she had told him not to.
Day 22	Nominations	Housemates nominated face-to-face for the second time. As Perez had already received eternal nomination he was unable to be nominated. Katie H, Keith and Nadia received the most nominations from their fellow Housemates and therefore face eviction with Perez.
Day 24	Punishments	Perez received a final formal warning for using offensive and threatening language during an argument with Calum.
Day 24	Tasks	Whilst the public rated the Housemates in a number of categories, the Housemates had to correctly guess the order they had been placed in. On Calum's team was Keith, Michelle and Nadia, and on Kavana's team was Cami-Li, Katie H, Katie P and Perez. Each team took it in turns to place the gym balls with the Housemate's faces on in the correct order from most to least from the category given. As Calum's team completed it the fastest, they won the task.
Day 24	Exits	Nadia became the fourth Housemate to be evicted from the House.
Day 25	Tasks	Housemates took part in their next shopping task, Big Brother's Freak Show. Katie H and Katie P became the two-headed Katie and had to correctly guess what the other Housemate's had answered from questions asked to them earlier. Michelle became Mystic Michelle and had to give the Housemate's honest advice from their time in the house. Kavana became the singing dummy and had to sing negative tweets about him whilst smiling, and Calum, Cami-Li and Perez became the three little pigs and had to eat three disgusting dishes. Housemates passed the overall task winning a luxury shopping budget.
Day 26	Tasks	Housemates were given the chance to win letters from home. Michelle and Katie H went up against Perez and Katie P in separate rooms and were given a button each. If they pushed the button, their opponents letters would be destroyed and they would receive their own, however if neither of them pushed the button or both of them did, all of the letters would be destroyed. As neither pair hit the button, the letters were drenched with acid. Next was Cami-Li and Calum against Kavana and Keith, with the same rules applying, Cami-Li hit her button ensuring she and Calum would receive her letter and Kavana and Keith would not.
Day 26	Nominations	Housemates nominated once again, and as Perez was already cursed with eternal nomination he could not be nominated. Cami-Li, Katie P and Keith received the most votes to face eviction with Perez.
Day 27	Tasks	Kavana was given a secret mission to get emotional in front of three other Housemates so that they console him, giving him a hug.
Day 27	Twists	As the nomination results were announced live, the nominated Housemates were shown who nominated them. After these were announced the phone lines opened ready for a surprise eviction.; Emma entered the House to announce the eviction results. (See Exits)
Day 27	Exits	Cami-Li became the fifth Housemate to be evicted from the House.
Day 29	Exits	Kavana became the sixth Housemate to be evicted from the House.; Perez became the seventh Housemate to be evicted from the House.
Day 31	Exits	Michelle left in 5th place, Keith finished 4th and Calum was 3rd. Katie P was then announced as the winner, meaning Katie H finished second.

== Production ==
=== Logo ===
The official eye logo was revealed on 8 December 2014. The logo fits in with the series' 'twisted fairy tale' theme, with entangled branches and leaves making up the eye's shape. Unlike other celebrity series', it doesn't feature the iconic "star" in the centre of the pupil to differentiate it from its civilian series.

=== Sponsorship ===
This series was sponsored by classified ad website Gumtree, with the company offering users of the site the chance to sell their items to furnish the House. Furniture from the house was later sold on the website to raise money for charity.

=== Bit on the Side scheduling ===
Big Brother's Bit on the Side will only air five days a week for the first time since it launched in 2011. Channel 5 opted not to renew the Saturday edition of Bit on the Psych and as a consequence Iain Lee will not be returning to the show in any capacity.

=== House ===
As you enter the House, the upper stair area is mirrored with flashes of trees. The stairs remain unchanged from the previous series. In the living area, grey sofas are in a square pattern, and a red mirror, significant to the series, is in the centre of the living area wall. The dining table is lipstick red, with fairy tale style props gracing the top. The kitchen is in a square corner with white marble counters and the latest appliances. The bedroom is dark and forest like, with a large owl watching over the Housemates. The garden is largely unchanged, except for the redecorated pod and new hot tub with seating area. No pool is present. Back inside, the bathroom is very chic with a large black bathtub. The diary room is in the style of a spooky purple/blue forest. The chair itself is faux wolf fur, blending into the background.

== Ratings ==
Official ratings are taken from BARB.

	Official viewers (millions)				
	Week 1		Week 2	Week 3	Week 4
Saturday		2.6	2.61	2.32	2.29
Sunday		2.86	3.21	2.84	2.68
Monday		2.57	2.46	2.67	2.35
Tuesday		2.47	3.11	2.74	2.67
Wednesday	3.44	2.16	2.28	2.92	2.69
Thursday	2.82	2.79	2.83	3.13	2.82
Friday	2.59	3.04	2.64	2.91	2.81
Weekly average	2.73		2.73	2.79	2.62
Running average	2.73		2.73	2.75	2.72
Series average	2.72				
blue-coloured boxes denote live shows.
