= Jessica Cunningham =

Actor

- Born: 3 March 1987 (age 39); Dronfield, Derbyshire, England
- Occupations: Businesswoman; actress; TV personality; model
- Children: 6

Jessica Cunningham (born 3 March 1987) is a businesswoman, actress, model, and television personality best known for competing in the 2016 series of The Apprentice, coming fourth. She is also known for her appearance as a contestant on Celebrity Big Brother 19. She is the owner of the online fashion company ProdigalFox and the operations director for a PR and marketing agency.

== Early life ==
Jessica Cunningham was born in Dronfield, Derbyshire, England in March 1987. However, she was raised in Burnley, where her parents ran a second-hand store. They sent Cunningham to the private independent Westholme School in Blackburn, although she later switched to a state school, St Wilfrid's Church of England Academy, also in Blackburn.

Cunningham has also worked as a stripper and pole dancer in clubs across Northern England, under the name Roxanne Fox. Earning £40 and £300 a night, and sometimes up to £1,000 a day, she has stated that her parents are embarrassed but she has no regrets over her past career.

== Career ==
=== Business ===
Cunningham ran a fashion business, Famous Frocks, with her ex-partner and father of her three children, Alistair Eccles, which failed and shut down in 2015 after Eccles' conviction for money laundering. She posed for Loaded as a model when she was 21. She left her role as director at a marketing firm to focus on her fashion business ProdigalFox, and appear as a contestant on The Apprentice.

=== The Apprentice ===
Cunningham came to public attention when she participated in the twelfth series of Alan Sugar's The Apprentice. She stated she intended to participate with her "positive, helpful attitude", and described herself as a "dreamer" and a "female Jim Carrey." She was described as one of the "key entertainers" of the series. She was noted for becoming emotional and breaking down in tears on the show, and at one point had to be comforted by Alan Sugar's assistant Karren Brady. On this, she said "Everyone is capable of having a little cry under stressful and frustrating situations, and that is just how some people including myself deal with emotion."

Cunningham was knocked out of the competition in the interview round, in the second last week of the show, after her business plan was deemed unsatisfactory.

=== Acting ===
Cunningham made her acting debut in the negatively received horror film Lock In, later renamed Clown Kill, which was released in January 2014 and re-released under its new name in early 2017 due to the recent fame garnered by Cunningham after her appearance on The Apprentice. Filmed on a £148,000 budget, Cunningham plays the main protagonist, Jenny, an advertising executive who is kidnapped and sexually assaulted by a clown. After taking six months off work, she spends the night in an office block and is joined by the same clown who raped her.

=== Celebrity Big Brother 19 ===
Cunningham entered the reality TV show Celebrity Big Brother as a "late entrant" on 14 January 2017. Cunningham became the seventh housemate to be evicted on 27 January 2017, after receiving the fewest public votes against Irish pop duo Jedward, TV cleaner Kim Woodburn, model Bianca Gascoigne and reality TV stars Heidi Montag and Spencer Pratt.

== Personal life ==
Cunningham has three daughters with her former partner, Alistair Eccles, who committed suicide aged 35 in August 2017. She lives in Dronfield, Derbyshire. She has a sister, Emma Deeks, who is the co-founder of her fashion business ProdigalFox. Deeks also has a degree in fashion. Cunningham, on 5 July 2018, gave birth to her fourth child, with her boyfriend Alex Daw, after suffering a miscarriage.
