= Alicia Douvall =

English glamour model and television personality (born 1979)

- Born: Sarah Howes; 24 July 1979 (age 47); West Sussex, England
- Occupations: Model; television personality; entrepreneur
- Spouse: David Anstiss (m. 2026)
- Children: 2

Alicia Yasmin Douvall (/əˈliːsiə/ ə-LEE-see-ə; born Sarah Howes on 24 July 1979) is an English former glamour model, television personality, and entrepreneur. Douvall began glamour modelling in the 90s, appearing in publications such as Page 3; she went on to receive subsequent notability in British tabloids for her kiss-and-tell pieces, appearances on British reality television, such as Celebrity Love Island (2006), and Celebrity Big Brother (2015), as well as undergoing numerous cosmetic surgeries.

She is the founder of the vegan skincare brand The Douvall's, which is sold across the United Kingdom and some select stores in America.

== Early life ==
Alicia Douvall was born Sarah Howes on 24 July 1979, and raised in Horsham, West Sussex. At the age of 12, Douvall developed anorexia nervosa as a coping mechanism for the emotional distress caused by her father who often called her "ugly" and "stupid," resorting to extreme dieting, consuming minimal food, and often went days without eating. After she became pregnant with her first daughter at 15, she was pulled from school and thrown out by her parents.

== Career ==
=== Glamour modelling, tabloid coverage, and cosmetic surgery ===
In the late 1990s, she changed her name to Alicia Yasmin Douvall, and began her modelling career, posing for Page 3 and presenting on Playboy TV, earning £5000 a month. She went on to receive extensive tabloid coverage for her kiss-and-tell stories on Mick Hucknall, P Diddy, Mickey Rourke, and Dean Gaffney. Douvall underwent her first breast augmentation at just 17, which she viewed as a way to "enhance" her features and feel more feminine. According to Douvall, she has undergone more than 350 procedures; including at least 18 breast augmentations, 11 rhinoplasties, a chin implant, liposuction, rib contouring, butt implants, facelifts, and even had her toes shortened equaling out to over £1 million.

After birth of her youngest daughter in 2011, Douvall pledged to never have cosmetic surgery again after being diagnosed with sepsis, having a swollen lymph node and lump. In 2015, Douvall said she regretted getting plastic surgery, saying: "I would have not had surgery at all. I can't believe I was so gullible and believed what that they told me," she later said that cosmetic procedures should not be accessible to anyone under 21.

=== Reality television ===
In 2006, Douvall appeared on ITV's Celebrity Love Island for its second series, where she was the first evictee. In 2009, Douvall took part in the Sky Living reality series, Rehab, which documented her, along with other celebrities, being treated at a rehabilitation centre in Malibu, California, trying to overcome her addiction to plastic surgery.

In 2010, Douvall and her eldest daughter, Georgia, were the subject of the BBC Three documentary, Glamour Models, Mum and Me, which showed Douvall and Georgia, travelling to Nashville, Tennessee, in hopes to getting Georgia a modelling contract in Los Angeles, the programme documented Douvall often encouraging Georgia to seek plastic surgery. In 2012, there was a follow up documentary entitled, Glamour Model Mum, Baby and Me, this time, focusing on the pregnancy, and later delivery of Douvall's second child, Papaya Coco Piri.

On 7 January 2015, Douvall joined the fifteenth series of Celebrity Big Brother, which premiered on Channel 5. She became the second housemate to be evicted on Day 17, placing eleventh overall.

=== Other ventures ===
In 2011, Douvall and her eldest daughter, Georgia, founded the organic skincare brand, The Douvall's, which is vegan and cruelty free. The line has expanded to argan, body, and hair oils, makeup, candles and room spray, shampoo and conditioner, body wash, and children sleep spray. Douvall's is sold at Sephora, Debenhams, Superdrug, Walmart, Amazon, and many online boutiques.

In 2016, she published her autobiography, Don't Call Me Ugly. The memoir recounts her childhood struggles, and experiences with fame, plastic surgery, as well as her six month affair with Simon Cowell in 2011, with whom she claimed to have sex eleven times in one night.

== Personal life ==
Douvall is dyslexic. In an interview with The Sun, she said, "Because I'm dyslexic I left school at 14 without learning to read or write, so I don't have any of the basics other people have, like the alphabet."

In 2009, Douvall entered the Passages Addiction Treatment Centre in Malibu, California, claiming to be addicted to plastic surgery, stemming from body dysmorphic disorder (BDD), which she had been diagnosed with years prior.

Douvall has 2 children. In 2026, she married businessman David Anstiss.

== Television appearances ==
Year	Title	Notes
2002	Diners	Episode: 3 June 2002
2003	The Pilot Show	Episode: 12 December 2003
2005	VH1 News Presents	Episode: "Plastic Surgery Obsession"
2006	Celebrity Love Island	Contestant; Evicted Week 1
2007	The Real Extras	Episode: "Casualty and Cuba"
2008	WAG's World	Episode: "Alicia Douvall"
2008	Balls of Steel	Series 3, Episode 1
2009	Rehab	Episode: "Alicia Douvall"
2009–2010	Live from Studio Five	Series 1, Episodes 59 & 94
2010	The Podge and Rodge Show	Series 5, Episode 10
2010	Glamour Models, Mum and Me	BBC Three documentary
2012	Glamour Model Mum, Baby & Me	BBC Three documentary
2015	Celebrity Big Brother	Series 15 Housemate; Evicted Day 17
2015	Big Brother's Bit On The Side	Panelist; 4 episodes
2015	Celebrity Botched Up Bodies	Series 1, Episode 3

== Bibliography ==
- (31 August 2008) – Storm in a G Cup. Orana Publishing Limited. ISBN 9780955075162
- (30 September 2008) – Corruption and Candy. MPRO Limited. ISBN 9780956035202
- (29 July 2016) – Don't Call Me Ugly. Austin Macauley Publishers. ISBN 9781849634052
