= Celebrity Big Brother 2015 =

Celebrity Big Brother 2015 may refer to:

- Celebrity Big Brother 15
- Celebrity Big Brother 16
