= Calum Best =

British-American television personality (born 1981)

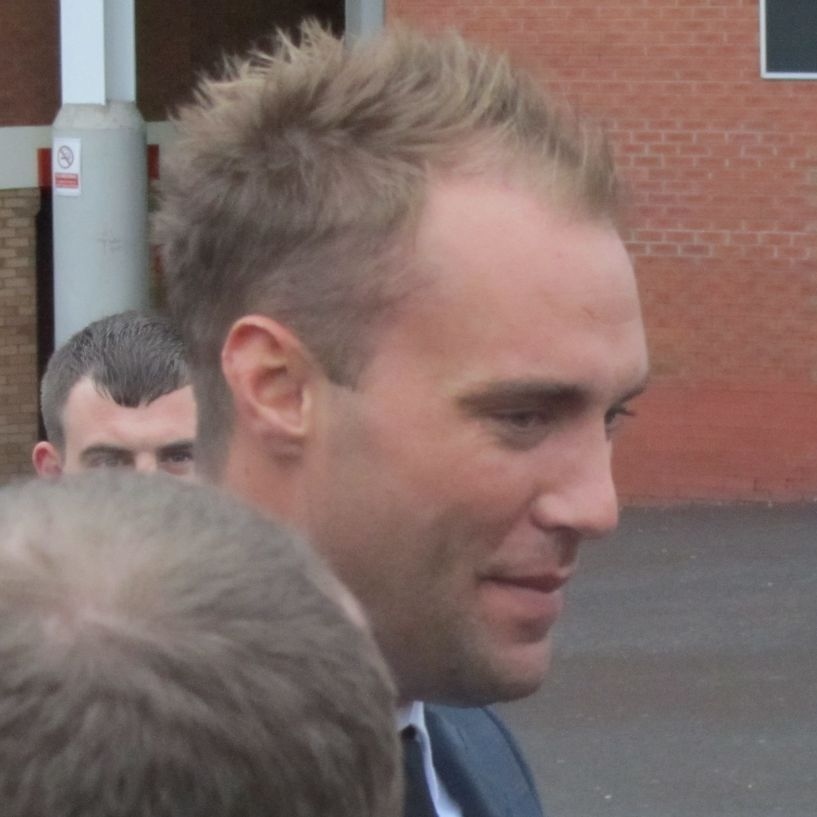
- Calum Best in 2010
- Born: Calum Milan Best; February 6, 1981 (age 45); San Jose, California, U.S.
- Citizenship: United States; United Kingdom; Ireland
- Occupation: Television personality
- Years active: 1996–present
- Parents: George Best (father); Angie Best (mother)
- Relatives: Samantha Womack (cousin)

Calum Milan Best (born February 6, 1981) is a British-American television personality, entrepreneur, and former model. He is the only child of footballer George Best. He is also the chairman of the Dorking Wanderers women's team.

== Early life and upbringing ==
Calum Milan Best was born on February 6, 1981, in San Jose, California, the son of British parents: Angie Best (born MacDonald-Janes), an English model, and the Northern Irish footballer George Best. Through his mother, Best is a cousin of British actress and singer Samantha Womack (nee. Janus): Angie's brother Noel is Womack's father. He was raised in Los Angeles, where he became a model in his mid-teens.

== Career ==
While working as a pizza boy in Malibu, California, Best began his career in modelling at 15 in Los Angeles, working with Kraft Ketchup, Calvin Klein, Tommy Hilfiger, and Guess jeans, before relocating to London, where he modelled for Burberry.

Best has taken part in the reality TV shows Fool Around With on E4 and The Match on Sky One. In 2005 and 2006, he was featured in both series of ITV's Celebrity Love Island, winning the second series on August 28, 2006. Around this time he played himself in the final episode of ITV's Footballers' Wives. In September 2006, Best appeared in the ITV2 series Calum, Fran and Dangerous Danan, in which he was seen traveling with Paul Danan and Fran Cosgrave from Texas to Los Angeles on America's U.S. Route 66.

In late 2006, Best launched a men's fragrance called "Calum", made by Jigsaw ESL.

In 2008, Best appeared in the fifth episode of presenter Lucy Kennedy's RTÉ series Livin' with Lucy. Later that year, he featured in MTV UK's Totally stand, Totally Calum Best, detailed Best's attempts to remain celibate for fifty days. In 2009, he appeared as a guest judge in the reality television show Paris Hilton's British Best Friend, in which he tested the contestants' flirting abilities. In November 2009, he presented the BBC TV Documentary Brought up By Booze: A Children in Need Special, which highlighted the plight of children brought up by alcoholic parents. Best drew upon his relationship with his own father in the making of the program, which the BBC described as a 'raw and often distressing journey'.

In 2010, Best appeared in Channel 4's Come Dine with Me, where he dined with Janice Dickinson, Samantha Fox and presenter Jeff Brazier. In 2012, Best hosted via webcam an Online bingo session at Bingocams UK on April 20, 2012. The same year, he won Ireland's Celebrity Bainisteoir, managing Moy Davitts of County Mayo.

In January 2015, he took part in the fifteenth series of Channel 5's reality series Celebrity Big Brother. He made it to the finale, coming third overall. In 2016, Best was a member of the cast of the E! series Famously Single, which follows eight single celebrities in their search for love. He also returned for the second season of Famously Single which premiered June 25, 2017. On January 3, 2017, he returned to compete on the nineteenth series of Celebrity Big Brother, in which he finished in seventh place. Also in 2017, he presented the documentary My Best. and appeared in third series of Celebs Go Dating.

In 2020, Best appeared on the first series of Celebrity Ex on the Beach. In 2022, Best appeared in and jointly won the fourth series of Celebrity SAS: Who Dares Wins. Described as a "brutal" final, 3 other surviving celebrity contestants also won the show’s final tasks.

== Charity work ==
Since 2016, Best has been a patron of the UK charity National Association for Children of Alcoholics (NACOA), and has spoken out about his own struggles dealing with an alcoholic parent.

In 2022, Best organized the My Tribute football charity event at Vitality Stadium, which raised funds for the Cherries Community Fund and NACOA. The event was attended and supported by Ant Middleton, Jeremy Lynch, James Arthur, Dwain Chambers, and Harry Redknapp. In 2023, he donated 100 items of his own clothing to a NACOA auction, which all proceeds would go to support.

== Personal life ==
Best dated actress Lindsay Lohan from 2006 to 2007; according to him, the relationship ended due to his infidelity, though they remained friendly.

=== Relationship with father ===
Since his father's death in 2005, Best has spoke about their tumultuous relationship, caused by his father's alcoholism. In his 2015 memoir, Second Best: My Dad and Me, Best recounts when his father disowned him at 14 after George accused Calum of having an affair with his second wife, Alex.

During his stint on Celebrity Big Brother in 2015, Best revealed he was left no inheritance from his father, as his father's estate of over £500,000 went to his sister and Calum's aunt, Barbara.

== Filmography ==
Year	Title	Role	Notes
2004	The Match	Contestant	
2005	Fool Around With	Contestant	
2006	Calum, Fran and Dangerous Danan	Himself	
2005-2006	Celebrity Love Island	Contestant	Series 2 winner
2008	Livin' with Lucy	Himself	Series 1
2008	Totally Calum Best: The Best Is Yet to Come	Himself	
2009	Paris Hilton's British Best Friend	Guest Judge	
2010	Come Dine with Me	Himself	
2011	Celebrity Salon	Contestant	Series 2
2012	Celebrity Bainisteoir	Contestant	Series 5 winner
2015	Celebrity Big Brother 15	Contestant	Series 15 - 3rd place
2015	Autopsy: The Last Hours of...George Best	Himself	Channel 5 documentary
2016-2017	Famously Single	Himself	Series 1 and 2
2017	Celebrity Big Brother 19	Contestant	Series 19
2017	In Therapy	Himself	Series 2
2017	Celebs Go Dating	Contestant	Series 3
2017	My Best	Himself	
2017	Retribution	Demeteri	Direct-to-DVD film
2017	Dangerous Game	Chris Rose	Direct-to-DVD film
2018	Just Tattoo of Us	Himself	Series 3
2020	Celebrity Ex on the Beach	Contestant	Series 1
2020	Celeb Ex in the City	Himself	Series 1
2021	George Best: True Genius	Narrator	
2022	SAS: Who Dares Wins	Contestant	Celebrity Series 4 Joint Winner
2022	Squad Goals: Dorking 'Til I Die	Himself	BBC Three Documentary
