= The Apprentice (British TV series) series 11 =

Eleventh season of UK television series

The Apprentice
- Series 11
- Promo group shot of Alan Sugar, Karren Brady, Claude Littner and the series 11 candidates
- Starring: Alan Sugar; Karren Brady; Claude Littner
- No. of episodes: 14

Release
- Original network: BBC One
- Original release: 14 October – 20 December 2015

Series chronology
- ← Previous; Series 10 Next → Series 12

The eleventh series of British reality television series The Apprentice was broadcast in the UK on BBC One, from 14 October to 20 December 2015. Due to the 2015 General Election being held in spring, which Alan Sugar had ties to through his role in the House of Lords, the BBC postponed the series' broadcast until the middle of autumn. This series saw Claude Littner replace Nick Hewer as Lord Sugar's aide. Alongside the standard twelve episodes, with the first two airing on consecutive days, the series was preceded by the online mini-episode "Meet the Candidates" on 6 October, with two specials aired alongside the series – The Final Five on 9 December, and Why I Fired Them on 16 December.

== Series overview ==
As Alan Sugar had political ties to the 2015 United Kingdom general election due to his appointment within the House of Lords, the airing schedule for series 11 was postponed until the autumn in order to adhere to the BBC's political impartiality rules. With Nick Hewer departing the programme following its tenth series, Claude Littner took over his role as Lord Sugar's aide, alongside series regular Karren Brady. Littner also served as an interviewer in the competition's penultimate episode. In addition, Linda Plant made her first appearance as an interviewer.

Filming on the series took place from mid-spring to early summer 2015. The team names for this series were "Versatile" and "Connexus". This is the only series to date in which a fired candidate Selina Waterman-Smith refused to appear on sister show The Apprentice: You're Fired. Meanwhile, fellow candidate Scott Saunders drew media attention for quitting the show, despite progressing to the next round.

The series saw Joseph Valente win Lord Sugar's investment, using his prize to start up and expand a plumbing business called Impra-Gas. He worked for two years, together with Sugar, to develop the company's business model, before assuming full control of the company in early 2017. While both men parted on good terms, the business collapsed just months later.

=== Candidates ===
Candidate	Background	Age	Result
Joseph Valente	Plumbing business owner	25	Winner
Vana Koutsomitis	Social media entrepreneur	27	Runner-up
Richard Woods	Marketing agency director	31	Fired after Interviews stage
Gary Poulton	Programme manager	34	Fired after Interviews stage
Charleine Wain	Hair and beauty salon owner	31	Fired after Interviews stage
Brett Butler-Smythe	Builder	28	Fired after tenth task
Selina Waterman-Smith	Events agency owner	31	Fired after ninth task
Scott Saunders	Senior account manager	27	Quit after ninth task
David Stevenson	Sports marketing company owner	25	Fired after eighth task
Sam Curry	Private tutor	23	Fired after seventh task
April Jackson	Boutique owner	26	Fired after sixth task
Mergim Butaja	Sales account manager	23	Fired after sixth task
Elle Stevenson	Operations executive	21	Fired after sixth task
Natalie Dean	Corporate account manager	25	Fired after fifth task
Ruth Whiteley	Training consultancy owner	47	Fired after fourth task
Jenny Garbis	Business management student	23	Fired after third task
Aisha Kasim	Inventor and hair extensions specialist	30	Fired after second task
Dan Callaghan	Fragrance retailer director	23	Fired after first task

=== Performance chart ===
Candidate	Task Number											
Candidate	1	2	3	4	5	6	7	8	9	10	11	12
Joseph	LOSS	IN	WIN	IN	IN	LOSS	IN	BR	LOSE	LOSS	IN	HIRED
Vana	LOSS	BR	LOSE	IN	IN	IN	LOSS	IN	IN	LOSS	IN	RUNNER-UP
Richard	IN	WIN	IN	IN	IN	LOSS	IN	IN	WIN	BR	FIRED	
Gary	IN	IN	IN	LOSS	LOSS	IN	WIN	LOSE	BR	BR	FIRED	
Charleine	IN	LOSS	LOSS	IN	WIN	LOSS	IN	BR	LOSS	LOSE	FIRED	
Brett	BR	IN	IN	LOSS	BR	WIN	BR	IN	IN	FIRED		
Selina	WIN	LOSS	LOSS	BR	LOSS	IN	LOSS	WIN	FIRED			
Scott	IN	IN	IN	LOSE	LOSS	IN	LOSE	IN	LEFT			
David	IN	IN	IN	WIN	IN	BR	IN	FIRED				
Sam	IN	IN	IN	IN	LOSE	IN	FIRED					
April	LOSE	LOSS	LOSS	IN	IN	FIRED						
Mergim	IN	IN	IN	IN	IN	FIRED						
Elle	LOSS	LOSS	BR	LOSS	LOSS	FIRED						
Natalie	IN	BR	LOSS	LOSS	FIRED							
Ruth	LOSS	LOSS	LOSS	FIRED								
Jenny	LOSS	LOSS	FIRED									
Aisha	LOSS	FIRED										
Dan	FIRED											

Key:

HIRED The candidate won this series of The Apprentice.
RUNNER-UP The candidate was the runner-up.
WIN The candidate won as project manager on his/her team, for this task.
LOSE The candidate lost as project manager on his/her team, for this task.
IN The candidate was on the winning team for this task / they passed the Interviews stage.
LOSS The candidate was on the losing team for this task.
BR The candidate was brought to the final boardroom for this task.
FIRED The candidate was fired in this task.
FIRED The candidate lost as project manager for this task and was fired.
LEFT The candidate left the competition after this task.

== Episodes ==
No. overall	No. in series	Title	Original release date	UK viewers (millions)
141	1	"Fish Food"	14 October 2015	8.03
Lord Sugar searches for a new business partner from a pool of eighteen new candidates. For their inaugural task, each team must purchase a range of fish to create lunchtime meals with to sell around London. Versatile opt for selling coley fish fingers and calamari and, while the former makes good sales, the latter is criticised for being low quality, with the team losing some stock due to a freezer malfunction. Connexus focus on selling salads and fishcakes and, while they make reasonable sales, the team face manufacturing issues and miss out on lunchtime trade. They also lack an effective pricing strategy. Versatile win the task, after Connexus barely break even. Of the final three, Dan Callaghan becomes the first to be fired for contributing to the production issues and for failing to make any sales.
142	2	"Advertising – Cactus Shampoo"	15 October 2015	7.41
This week's task is to create a new shampoo brand, complete with promotional campaign, before pitching their concept to industry experts. Versatile's target market is men, receiving praise for their TV advert and bottle design, despite poor pitching and facing criticism for their digital billboard. Connexus' target market is women over 50, but experts dislike their presentation, TV advert and brand logo, despite praising their digital billboard. Versatile win the task, leaving Connexus to face questions over their performance. Of the final three, Aisha Kasim is fired for her dictatorial leadership.
143	3	"Cross-Channel Discount Buying"	21 October 2015	7.86
Lord Sugar gives each team a list of nine items to procure. One half of each team go bargain hunting in Kent, while the other half are despatched to France. Versatile's England sub-team negotiate well, while their France sub-team fail to do so. They also struggle to source one of the required items. Connexus fail to source two items, with the England sub-team overspending on one purchase, while their France sub-team waste significant tasking time by bickering. Versatile secure victory thanks to strong negotiators, leaving Connexus to face scrutiny over their performance and lack of strategy. Of the final three, Jenny Garbis is fired for her lack of involvement in purchases, alongside her poor contributions to previous tasks.
144	4	"Pet Show"	28 October 2015	7.39
The teams head to the London Pet Show, each taking with them a selection of accessories and high-ticket items to sell to event attendees. Connexus opt for selling electronic cat toys, cat seat warmers, and large customisable cat beds. While they manage good sales on accessories, their efforts are hampered by poor sales of the cat beds. Versatile opt for selling animal-themed balloons, T-shirts and dog bed sofas, receiving favourable custom. Versatile achieve high sale figures, leaving Connexus to face an in-depth review of their failures. Of the losing team, Ruth Whiteley is fired for her lack of sales.
145	5	"Children's Book"	4 November 2015	7.40
Each team is tasked with creating their own children's book, including a written and audio version, and selling the finished product to retailers around London. Connexus create a story about a dragon, but rush production on the audiobook, as well as face concerns that the literature is too complex for their target age group. Versatile create a story about a bee, receiving good feedback and sales from retailers, despite friction between some members of the team. In the boardroom, Versatile secure victory thanks to a last-minute sale, leaving Connexus to come under fire. Of the final three, Natalie Dean is dismissed for demonstrating a lack of maturity, poor pitching skills, and a weak track record in the process.
146	6	"Handy Man"	11 November 2015	7.67
Each team is tasked with running their own DIY business, securing work around London on their own initiative, as well as fulfilling contracts arranged by Lord Sugar. Versatile deliver poor quality work on jobs, and arrange a last-minute contract that pays little. Connexus make a good income and deliver good-quality work, despite wasting time on creating flyers, renegotiating the terms of one job, and doing unnecessary work for one contract. Connexus win the task, leaving Versatile to face criticism over their performance. Of the losing team, Elle Stevenson is fired for her non-existent leadership and dismal track record. Mergim Butaja is also fired, for his lack of maturity and experience. A third candidate, April Jackson, is fired for her poor pricing strategy and lack of notable business skills.
147	7	"Discount Store"	18 November 2015	7.12
The teams are tasked with running their own discount shop in a Manchester shopping centre. Versatile focus on selling a mixed range of products, achieving good sales and investing in high-value products, despite lacking a strategy and proper direction on the second day. Connexus focus on selling a variety of electronic items, achieving good sales on the first day, yet struggle to make more on the second day due to in-fighting. Versatile are praised for their strategy, securing them victory, while Connexus face questions around their performance. Of the final three, Sam Curry is fired for his lack of sales, his lack of presence in tasks, and demonstrating poor mathematical skills.
148	8	"Party Planning"	25 November 2015	6.92
Both teams become party planners, creating a fun-filled children's party on a £2,000 budget. Versatile create an outdoor activity party, but their performance is hindered by miscommunication within the team and poor negotiations when securing their chosen venues; they also offer both a poor service and poor-quality gifts to their clients' guests. Connexus create a mini-Olympian party, negotiating well on venues and providing a quality service, but face catering issues and are taken aback when their client refuses their bespoke party bags. Versatile face criticism over their performance in the boardroom, and Connexus are praised for their well-received party. Of the losing team, David Stevenson is fired over his poor contributions on the task, alongside his lack of business tenacity and passion.
149	9	"Property Agents"	2 December 2015	6.98
Teams become property agents, earning commission on the sales of mid- and high-end properties around London. Versatile achieve sales of their mid-range properties in Stratford and Lewisham, but come undone owing to their uninformed approach to the sales of their high-end properties. Connexus sell properties in Canary Wharf and Clapham, achieving good sales of their high-end stock, but face issues selling the mid-range properties due to stumbling sales pitches and also demonstrating a lack of property knowledge. Although Connexus earn a higher commission and win the task, the team are surprised when Scott Saunders chooses to leave over the heavy criticism of his overall performance. Of Versatile, Selina Waterman-Smith is fired for her lack of sales, her immature attitude and her poor track record in tasks.
150	10	"Health Snack"	9 December 2015	7.07
The teams create a brand-new range of healthy snacks to pitch to retailers. Versatile create a range of snack bars, but face poor feedback from consumer focus groups and retailers over the branding, the lack of nutritional information on the packaging, and the taste and texture of their snack. Connexus create a range of dehydrated vegetable crisps and, despite good feedback on the flavour, the retailers criticise the packaging and the overuse of olive oil in the crisps' production. Lord Sugar expresses disappointment in the boardroom when neither team secures orders, leaving them all to face scrutiny over their performance on the task. Ultimately, Brett Butler-Smythe is fired for his poor leadership of his team, his poor pitching, and demonstrating limited business skills.
151	SP–1	"The Final Five"	9 December 2015	N/A
As the series finale draws closer, this special episode profiles the five remaining candidates.
152	11	"Interviews"	16 December 2015	7.47
The candidates are interviewed by four of Lord Sugar's most trusted associates, facing scrutiny over their backgrounds, work experience, track record, and business proposals. Charleine Wain is fired for her inexperience and concerns about her proposal; Gary Poulton is fired for his flawed proposal and failure to amend his corporate image; and Richard Woods is fired for his evasive answers in interviews and questionable proposal. Vana Koutsomitis and Joseph Valente proceed to the finale.
153	SP–2	"Why I Fired Them"	16 December 2015	N/A
As the final looms, Lord Sugar takes a look back on the series so far, reliving all of the mistakes, doomed decisions, and other notable events that occurred during the process, and provides his reasons behind each firing.
154	12	"The Final"	20 December 2015	6.61
The two finalists, aided by the fired candidates, launch their business proposals to an audience of business and industry experts. Joseph presents his plan for a new gas plumbing service, receiving good feedback from experts on his video advert, despite raising concerns over its name and logo design. Vana presents her plan for a new dating app with gaming features: its advertising and logo design are well-received during her pitch, but she faces serious concerns over its target market and its financial strength. Joseph Valente is crowned the series' winner.

== Controversy ==
=== Selina Waterman-Smith ===
Selina accused two other female candidates of bullying during series' filming, while also criticising the conditions candidates were kept in. She accused producers on Twitter during the series' broadcast of treating her as a "pantomime villain", and refused to take part in the sister show You're Fired after her dismissal.

=== Richard Woods' health ===
As a rule for those applying to take part in The Apprentice, all medical information must be made available to production staff to assess if they can take part in the series without disruption. Following his involvement in the eleventh series, Richard Woods revealed in an interview that he had not disclosed certain information, despite having suffered three mini-strokes and delaying a procedure to preserve the sight in his left eye. It was later stated that, despite his non-disclosure, production staff ensured all candidates nevertheless had access to good healthcare, and that the show's doctor had seen no issues with Woods taking part in the series.

== Ratings ==
Official episode viewing figures are from BARB.

Episode no.	Airdate	7-day viewers (millions)	28-day viewers (millions)	BBC One weekly ranking
1	14 October 2015	7.93	8.03	3
2	15 October 2015	7.22	7.41	7
3	21 October 2015	7.70	7.86	3
4	28 October 2015	7.25	7.39	3
5	4 November 2015	7.23	7.40	5
6	11 November 2015	7.57	7.67	4
7	18 November 2015	6.97	7.12	6
8	25 November 2015	6.65	6.92	6
9	2 December 2015	6.77	6.98	6
10	9 December 2015	6.91	7.07	5
11	16 December 2015	7.39	7.47	3
12	20 December 2015	6.52	6.61	10
