= Alana Spencer =

British entrepreneur

- Born: Alana Spencer; 11 February 1992 (age 34); Aberystwyth, Wales
- Education: Aberystwyth University
- Known for: Winner of The Apprentice

Alana Spencer (born 11 February 1992) is a Welsh businesswoman and entrepreneur from Aberystwyth. She is notable for winning the twelfth series of BBC One's The Apprentice in 2016. The programme's first Welsh winner, Spencer received a £250,000 investment from Lord Sugar for her luxury cake and chocolate business, Ridiculously Rich by Alana.

== Early life ==
She grew up in Loughborough and Llanrhystud, Ceredigion and attended Ysgol Gyfun Aberaeron for her education where, aged 16, she took her first chocolate order for one of her teachers.
