= Cami-Li =

Puerto Rican television personality

Cami Li
- Born: Camila Figueras; 30 December 1987 (age 38); San Juan, Puerto Rico
- Occupations: Alternative model and television personality
- Years active: 2011–2019
- Television: Celebrity Big Brother (2015); Ex on the Beach (2015)
- Spouse: Brent Lincowski (m. 2018)
- Partner: Kirk Norcross (2013)
- Children: 2

Cami Lincowski (born Camila Figueras; 30 December 1987) is a Puerto Rican-American realtor and former alternative model and reality television personality. She is best known for her appearances on Channel 5's Celebrity Big Brother and MTV UK's Ex On The Beach.

== Early life ==
Li was born in Puerto Rico and is of Cuban ancestry. She was raised in Miami, Florida. When Li was a child, her 21 year old sister, was murdered by a criminal on the run from the police. Li has since stated this tragedy inspired her to become a lawyer saying; "because the injustice of the trial was just ridiculous."

== Career ==
Li first gained recognition modeling as an alternative and tattoo model in 2011. Li has been on the covers of Bella Morte Magazine (April & May 2011), Tattoo Envy (January/February, November/December 2012), Goomah (December 2012) and Petite Alternative (January & October 2014). In 2015, she was featured in Zoo Magazine's 561 issue.

In April 2014, Li began regularly hosting CodeBabes. In January 2015, Li would take part in the fifteenth series of Channel 5's Celebrity Big Brother UK. She was the fifth housemate to be evicted after being evicted via the public vote, placing eighth overall. In August, Li appeared on MTV UK's Ex on the Beach for its third series. Li would enter as her ex-fiancée's, Kirk Norcross, ex in episode four. Li voluntarily left the house in episode eight alongside Vicky Pattison.

In 2018, she appeared on the sixteenth season of TLC's Say Yes to the Dress. In January 2019, she and her husband, Brent, would appear in the first episode of the seventeenth series, entitled "Hell Yes to the Dress", as well an episode of HGTV's Say Yes to the Nest.

Li currently works in Las Vegas, Nevada as a realtor.

== Personal life ==
In July 2013, Li got engaged to television personality Kirk Norcross; they later broke up in December of the same year.

In 2017, Li announced her engagement to Brent Lincowski. They would wed in Miami, Florida in 2018.

== Filmography ==
Year	Title	Role	Notes
2015	Celebrity Big Brother UK	Herself	Series 15 Housemate; evicted Day 27
2015	Celebrity Big Brother's Bit on the Side	Herself	Panelist; 8 episodes
2015	Lorraine	Herself	Guest; 1 episode
2015	CodeBabes	Herself	Host
2015	Ex On The Beach	Herself	Series 3; arrived episode 4; left episode 8
2018-2019	Say Yes to the Dress	Herself	2 episodes
2019	Say Yes to the Nest	Herself	1 episode
