= Paris Hilton's British Best Friend =

- Created by: Paris Hilton
- Starring: Paris Hilton
- Opening theme: "My BFF" by Paris Hilton
- Ending theme: "My BFF" (instrumental)
- Country of origin: United Kingdom
- No. of seasons: 1
- No. of episodes: 8

Production
- Executive producers: Michael Hirschorn; Stella Stolper; Jason Moore; Rachel Ashdown; Natalka Znak
- Running time: 45 minutes
- Production companies: Lionsgate Television; Ish Entertainment; ITV Productions

Original release
- Network: ITV2
- Release: 29 January – 19 March 2009

Paris Hilton's British Best Friend is a British reality television series in which Paris Hilton searches for her new best friend in London. The first spin-off of My New BFF (2008–2009), the ITV2 series was filmed around Christmas 2008 and premiered on 29 January 2009, consisting of eight episodes.

== Series overview ==
Partial cast of the series' British version

The British version of the series, Paris Hilton's British Best Friend, premiered on 29 January 2009 on ITV2. Hilton shot the majority of the series in London, with portions of the first and last episodes shot in the U.S. Twelve women and one man competed in challenges in an attempt to become Paris' British Best Friend.

Guest stars included Charlie Sheen, Martin Sheen, Rick Hilton, Kathy Hilton, Akin Konizi, Chris Leger, Scott Henshall, Boyd Hilton, Will Geddes, Mark Durden-Smith, Jade Jagger, Kate Michelson, Jackie Collins, Tamara Beckwith, Olivia Lee, Scott Mills, Vanessa Lloyd-Platt, Callum Best, Steve Shaw, Julian Bennett, Benji Madden, Allison Melnick, Nicky Hilton and Barron Hilton. Scenes featuring Hilton partying with Katie Price as well as a performance at the BBF mansion by Good Charlotte are believed to have been shot but did not make the final cut in any episodes.

The first episode featured cameos from American BFF contestants Brittany, Onch, Vanessa, Kiki, Sinsu and Lauren while showing Paris' going away party before departing for London. In the finale, Vanessa, Onch and Lauren are seen again when Paris introduces the British finalists to some of her American friends. They are also seen with Brittany at Barron Hilton's birthday party in the same episode. Contestant Laura Meakin was added to the competition in episode two to replace Kat McKenzie, albeit temporarily, due to illness. For this reason, she does not appear in promotional material for the series. McKenzie later died, on 3 July 2009.

On 19 March 2009 it was revealed in the finale that Sam Hextall became Paris' British Best Friend.

== Contestants ==
| Name | Age | From | Episode eliminated |
|---|---|---|---|
| Samuel "Sam" Hextall | 19 | Burgess Hill | Winner |
| Kat McKenzie | 25 | Guildford | 8 |
| Emma Soraya Beard | 25 | Northampton | 8 |
| Carrie Amor | 23 | Yeovil | 8 |
| Felicia "Flic" Field | 24 | London | 7 |
| Chrissie Wunna | 27 | Pontefract | 7 |
| Meddy Ford | 19 | Caerphilly | 6 |
| Laura Meakin | 27 | London | 5 |
| Ola Ademola | 21 | Nuneaton | 5 |
| Layla Ward | 25 | Reading | 4 |
| Lydia Cottrell | 19 | York | 3 |
| Laura Perry | 27 | Essex | 2 |
| Jade Morgan | 19 | Liverpool | 1 |

== Episode process ==
| Contestant | Episode | | | | | | | | |
| Contestant | Rank | 1 | 2 | 3 | 4 | 5 | 6 | 7 | 8 |
|---|---|---|---|---|---|---|---|---|---|
| Samuel | 1st | SAFE | SAFE | WIN | WIN | SAFE | WIN | LOW | BBF |
| Kat | 2nd | SAFE | LEFT | | | PET | LOW | WIN | TTYS |
| Emma | 3rd | SAFE | SAFE | SAFE | SAFE | SAFE | PET | SAFE | TTYS |
| Carrie | 4th | SAFE | PET | SAFE | LOW | SAFE | WIN | SAFE | TTYS |
| Flic | 5th | SAFE | SAFE | WIN | PET | SAFE | WIN | TTYS | |
| Chrissie | 6th | SAFE | LOW | SAFE | WIN | WIN | SAFE | TTYS | |
| Meddy | 7th | SAFE | SAFE | SAFE | SAFE | LOW | TTYN | | |
| Laura M. | 8th | | SAFE | SAFE | SAFE | TTYN | | | |
| Ola | 9th | SAFE | SAFE | LOW | WIN | TTYS | | | |
| Layla | 10th | LOW | SAFE | SAFE | TTYN | | | | |
| Lydia | 11th | SAFE | LOW | TTYN | | | | | |
| Laura P. | 12th | WIN | QUIT | | | | | | |
| Jade | 13th | TTYN | | | | | | | |

The contestant is a female
The contestant is a male
The contestant became Paris' new BBF
The contestant won the challenge
The contestant was captain of the winning team in a challenge
The contestant was up for discussion/elimination and was saved (was in the bottom).
The contestant could not be present at elimination due to illness
The contestant was eliminated
The contestant wasn't in the competition at that point
The contestant was put up for discussion/elimination at panel and won the challenge.
The contestant was made the Pet.
The contestant willingly left the competition.
The contestant was asked to leave for medical reasons.
The contestant was eliminated outside panel.
The contestant was chosen by the Pet to be eliminated.
TTYN Talk to you never. Paris will most likely never associate with the contestant.
TTYS Talk to you soon. Paris will most likely speak with the contestant in the future.

Notes

- In Episode 2 the Pet, Carrie, had the power to place one contestant up for discussion, she chose Chrissie.
- During the discussion in Episode 2, Laura P. walked out and quit the show (because of Carrie's "fakeness") after she said people were being fake (Carrie and Emma) and said that if they stayed she would go, because she left no one was eliminated.
- In Episode 2 Laura M. replaced Kat due to Kat's appendectomy.
- In Episode 3 the contestants themselves decided who should be up for discussion.
- Kat was eliminated in Episode 2 on medical grounds, but after recovering, Paris invited her back in Episode 4 and made her the Pet.
- In Episode 5 the Pet, Kat, decided on one person that should be eliminated, this person was Ola.
- In Episode 6 the contestants suggested who they thought should be up for discussion, they chose Kat.
- In Episode 7 Chrissie was eliminated outside of panel.
- In Episode 8 Carrie was eliminated before going to L.A.
- In Episode 8 Samuel could not enter some clubs because he was not over 21.

== Episodes ==
=== Episode 1 ===
First aired 29 January 2009

Socialite Paris Hilton is in search of a British best friend. The 12 hopefuls will need ambition and determination to pass her tests. Who will be Paris's new party pal?

— ITV2 episode summary

- Challenge Winner: Laura P.
- Bottom 2: Jade, Layla
- Eliminated: Jade

=== Episode 2 ===
First aired 5 February 2009

Paris Hilton's search for a British Best Friend goes on. It is truth time for the wannabes, and then they must face an all-night party mission. But things are about to turn sour.

— ITV2 episode summary

- Challenge Winner: Chrissie
- Bottom 2: Chrissie, Lydia
- Withdrew: Laura P.
- Eliminated: Kat (asked to leave)

=== Episode 3 ===
First aired 12 February 2009

Ten wannabes remain in the quest to become heiress Paris Hilton's new British best friend. Today they must prove they know Paris's taste and style by designing a dress for her.

— ITV2 Episode Summary

- Challenge Winner: Team Sam, Team Flic
- Bottom 2: Ola, Lydia
- Eliminated: Lydia

=== Episode 4 ===
First aired 19 February 2009

Paris Hilton continues her search for a British best friend. The hopefuls are sent to a farm to see if they share Paris's love of animals. Plus there are some shocks in the house.

— ITV2 episode summary

- Challenge Winner: Sam
- Bottom 2: Carrie, Layla
- Eliminated: Layla

=== Episode 5 ===
First aired 26 February 2009

Paris Hilton's search for a British best friend goes on. The wannabes must perform in a talent show for Paris and Scott Mills. Then she will hear from the hopefuls' own best pals.

— ITV2 episode summary

- Challenge Winner: Chrissie
- Bottom 3: Meddy, Laura M., and Ola
- Eliminated: Ola and Laura M.

=== Episode 6 ===
First aired 5 March 2009

- Challenge Winner: Carrie, Flic & Sam
- Bottom 2: Meddy, Kat
- Eliminated: Meddy

=== Episode 7 ===
First aired 12 March 2009

- Challenge Winners: Flic, Kat & Sam
- Bottom 2: Flic, Samuel
- Eliminated: Chrissie, Flic

=== Episode 8 ===
First aired 19 March 2009

- 4th Place Carrie
- 3rd Place Emma
- 2nd Place Kat
- Winner Samuel

== Broadcast ==
=== United Kingdom ===
The series aired on ITV2 from 29 January to 19 March 2009. The first episode reportedly received 428,000 viewers with 2% share.

=== Other territories ===
This version aired on MuchMusic in Canada in 2009, before debuting in the United States on 6 April 2010 through the TV Guide Network.
