= Clown Kill =

- Film poster
- Directed by: Mark J. Howard
- Screenplay by: Mark J. Howard
- Produced by: Stephen Greenhalgh; Mark J. Howard
- Starring: Jessica Cunningham; Roy Basnett; Stephen Greenhalgh
- Edited by: Mark J. Howard
- Music by: Dead Kestrels; Kevin MacLeod; James Thompson
- Release date: 2014
- Running time: 80 minutes
- Country: United Kingdom
- Language: English
- Budget: £148,000

Clown Kill (originally released as Lock In), is a 2014 British slasher film written and directed by Mark J. Howard, produced by Howard and Stephen Greenhalgh, and starring Jessica Cunningham.

== Plot ==
Jenny, an ambitious, feisty advertising executive was kidnapped by a clown after having her drink spiked in a bar, and is raped by a clown. After taking six months off work, she comes back to work again when she decides to spend the night in the office block due to a deadline to meet when she is terrorised by the same clown who raped her six months ago.

== Production ==
The film received mainstream attention after its star Jessica Cunningham participated in The Apprentice in late 2016. The media expressed incredulity that Cunningham had been involved in the film.

Cunningham was six months pregnant when she filmed scenes of being raped, as well as a shower scene in which she appears nude. She additionally had to perform scenes in which she is tied up and has her mouth gagged.

== Reception ==
The film has received mixed reviews.
