= The Apprentice (British TV series) series 12 =

Twelfth season of UK television series

The Apprentice
- Series 12
- Promo group shot of Alan Sugar standing before the candidates for series 12
- Starring: Alan Sugar; Karren Brady; Claude Littner
- No. of episodes: 14

Release
- Original network: BBC One
- Original release: 6 October – 18 December 2016

Series chronology
- ← Previous; Series 11 Next → Series 13

The twelfth series of British reality television series The Apprentice was broadcast in the UK on BBC One, from 6 October to 18 December 2016. Due to live coverage of the UK EU membership referendum in late spring, alongside live coverage of Euro 2016 and the 2016 Summer Olympics, the BBC postponed the series' broadcast until the middle of autumn to avoid schedule clashes.

It is the first series to date to air on Thursdays rather than on Wednesdays, as had been the norm until then. It is so far the only series to feature a candidate quitting the programme while a task is in progress. Alongside the standard twelve episodes, the series was preceded by the online mini-episode "Meet the Candidates" on 27 September, with two specials airing alongside the series – The Final Five on 13 December, and Why I Fired Them on 16 December.

Eighteen candidates took part, with Alana Spencer winning the series. Excluding the specials, the series averaged around 7.12 million viewers during its broadcast.

== Series overview ==
Applications for the twelfth series opened in December 2015, and filming took place from late spring to early summer 2016.

This series' team names were Titan and Nebula. For the second time in the programme's history, one task saw neither team win. This series also set the record for the highest number of candidates to be summoned back to the boardroom for the usual "bottom three" debrief. It also marks the first time in the show's history that a candidate left the process while a task was underway. Of those who took part, Alana Spencer is crowned winner, going on to use her prize money to start up the bakery business, Ridiculously Rich.

=== Candidates ===
| Candidate | Background | Age | Result |
|---|---|---|---|
| Alana Spencer | Cake company owner | 24 | Winner |
| Courtney Wood | Novelty gift company owner | 29 | Runner-up |
| Frances Bishop | Children's clothing company owner | 25 | Fired after Interviews stage |
| Jessica Cunningham | Online fashion entrepreneur | 29 | Fired after Interviews stage |
| Grainne McCoy | Make-up studio owner | 31 | Fired after Interviews stage |
| Trishna Thakrar | Recruitment agent | 28 | Fired after tenth task |
| Sofiane Khelfa | Senior sales executive | 32 | Fired after ninth task |
| Dillon St. Paul | Art director | 37 | Fired after ninth task |
| Paul Sullivan | Marketing agency owner | 38 | Fired after eighth task |
| Samuel Boateng | Sales manager | 27 | Fired after seventh task |
| Karthik Nagesan | IT consultancy owner | 33 | Fired after seventh task |
| Rebecca Jeffery | Design & marketing agency owner | 31 | Fired after sixth task |
| JD O'Brien | Beachwear company owner | 37 | Fired after fifth task |
| Mukai Noiri | Digital marketing manager | 36 | Fired after fourth task |
| Aleksandra King | Business consultancy owner | 38 | Quit during fourth task |
| Oliver Nohl-Oser | Food distribution business owner | 33 | Fired after third task |
| Natalie Hughes | Hair and beauty salon owner | 30 | Fired after second task |
| Michelle Niziol | Property consultancy owner | 35 | Fired after first task |

=== Performance chart ===
| Candidate | Task Number | | | | | | | | | | | |
| Candidate | 1 | 2 | 3 | 4 | 5 | 6 | 7 | 8 | 9 | 10 | 11 | 12 |
|---|---|---|---|---|---|---|---|---|---|---|---|---|
| Alana | BR | BR | WIN | IN | IN | IN | BR | IN | LOSS | IN | IN | HIRED |
| Courtney | IN | LOSS | IN | IN | IN | WIN | LOSS | IN | IN | WIN | IN | RUNNER-UP |
| Frances | LOSS | LOSS | LOSS | LOSS | LOSS | LOSS | WIN | BR | IN | BR | FIRED | |
| Jessica | LOSS | LOSE | IN | IN | LOSS | LOSS | IN | BR | IN | IN | FIRED | |
| Grainne | LOSS | LOSS | LOSS | LOSE | IN | IN | LOSS | IN | BR | LOSE | FIRED | |
| Trishna | LOSS | LOSS | IN | IN | IN | LOSE | IN | LOSS | WIN | FIRED | | |
| Sofiane | IN | LOSS | IN | WIN | LOSS | BR | IN | LOSS | FIRED | | | |
| Dillon | IN | LOSS | IN | IN | IN | IN | BR | WIN | FIRED | | | |
| Paul | WIN | LOSS | BR | LOSS | BR | LOSS | IN | FIRED | | | | |
| Samuel | IN | LOSS | IN | IN | WIN | IN | FIRED | | | | | |
| Karthik | IN | BR | LOSS | BR | IN | IN | FIRED | | | | | |
| Rebecca | BR | LOSS | LOSS | LOSS | BR | FIRED | | | | | | |
| JD | IN | BR | IN | IN | FIRED | | | | | | | |
| Mukai | IN | LOSE | BR | FIRED | | | | | | | | |
| Aleksandra | LOSS | LOSS | LOSS | LEFT | | | | | | | | |
| Oliver | IN | LOSS | FIRED | | | | | | | | | |
| Natalie | LOSS | FIRED | | | | | | | | | | |
| Michelle | FIRED | | | | | | | | | | | |

Key:

HIRED The candidate won this series of The Apprentice.
RUNNER-UP The candidate was the runner-up.
WIN The candidate won as project manager on their team, for this task.
LOSE The candidate lost as project manager on their team, for this task.
IN The candidate was on the winning team for this task / they passed the Interviews stage.
LOSS The candidate was on the losing team for this task.
BR The candidate was brought to the final boardroom for this task.
FIRED The candidate was fired in this task.
FIRED The candidate lost as project manager for this task and was fired.
LEFT The candidate left the process.

== Episodes ==
| No. overall | No. in series | Title | Original release date | UK viewers (millions) |
|---|---|---|---|---|
| 155 | 1 | "Collectables" | 6 October 2016 | 7.60 |
For their first task, each team is given a collection of antiques which they must value and then sell. The men achieve good sales of their antiques, despite choosing a poor market location late in the task. The women manage reasonable sales but lack strategy - they spend too long valuing their pieces and often don't have their items to hand when trying to secure deals. Titan achieve victory, while Nebula face questions. Of the final three, Michelle Niziol becomes the first candidate to be fired for her poor management skills and lack of strategy.
| 156 | 2 | "Advertising – Jeans" | 13 October 2016 | 7.59 |
The teams are tasked with branding and advertising a new range of Japanese jeans, before pitching their concept to industry experts. Titan focus their campaign towards both men and women, but face poor communication within the team and in-fighting, while their overall concept is panned by the experts; however, they receive praise for their clear marketing message. Nebula design women's jeans, but face issues from a weak leader, with the experts criticising their concept for having an unclear marketing message and a poorly-designed TV advert. In the boardroom, Lord Sugar deems neither team the winner, leaving three members from each to face scrutiny over their performance. Of the final six, Natalie Hughes is fired due to her self-confessed lack of drive to continue in the process, her lack of contributions, and lack of business initiative.
| 157 | 3 | "Corporate Candy" | 20 October 2016 | 7.49 |
The teams manufacture their own range of sweets to sell in Brighton to both passing trade and a corporate client. Titan make a range of luxury toffees and pillow sweets and achieve decent sales, despite a manufacturing mishap and aggressive sales tactics. Nebula create a range of traditional seaside treats, including rock and fudge, but face serious issues due to a lack of pricing strategy and no fudge sales. Titan achieve victory, while Nebula face questions. Oliver Nohl-Oser is fired for weak and indecisive leadership, under-utilising his expertise, and choosing an unappealing fudge flavour.
| 158 | 4 | "Department Store" | 27 October 2016 | 7.83 |
The teams sell products and run their own personal shopping service in Liberty of London. Owing to their inviting window display Titan achieve good sales on their line of scarves, but secure little footfall for their personal shopping service. Nebula fail to properly utilise their window display, leading them to secure disappointing sales on their range of handbags. Titan win the task. Aleksandra King resigns from the process, citing personal reasons. Mukai Noiri is fired for poor choice of products, his lack of sales, and his overall poor track record.
| 159 | 5 | "Cycling Crowdfunding" | 3 November 2016 | 7.51 |
The teams are tasked with crowdfunding for a new cycling product, creating a PR stunt and campaign video to help secure pledges from cycling retailers. Nebula promote safety-conscious headphones, managing to secure a reasonable number of pledges. However, they're let down by their poor pitch, lack of proper pricing information, lacklustre PR video, and a mistake on their crowdfunding site that delays pledging. Titan opt for promoting a gilet with built-in LED lights and while the promo video for the product is poorly conceived, they secure a decent number of pledges off the back of their strong pitch. Titan win the task. Of the final three, JD O'Brien is fired for his mistakes as team leader and his lack of contributions in tasks.
| 160 | 6 | "Overnight Discount Buying" | 10 November 2016 | 7.41 |
The teams are tasked with fulfilling a list of nine required purchases, seeking out bargains around London. Titan opt to source items on the move and manage to secure eight of the required items. Nebula secure seven of the required items and despite getting a good bargain on one purchase, half the team fail to return on time and face a penalty fine as a result. Titan win the task, leaving Nebula to face scrutiny over their performance. Of the final three, Rebecca Jeffery is fired for failing to make any purchases, her poor presence in tasks, and her overall track record.
| 161 | 7 | "Boat Show" | 17 November 2016 | 6.80 |
Each team heads to the Poole Harbour Boat Show, selling a selection of boating and leisure industry products to visitors. Nebula focus on selling motorboats, themed backpacks, full face snorkels and paddleboards, achieving decent sales. Titan focus on selling jet skis and cushions, but secure few sales due to a lacklustre pricing and sales strategy. Nebula win the task, while Titan face the boardroom over their dismal sale figures. Karthik Nagesan is fired for his poor leadership, his lack of sales and his questionable personality, while Samuel Boateng is dismissed for his stubborn personality and his lack of presence in tasks.
| 162 | 8 | "London Landmarks" | 24 November 2016 | 6.59 |
Lord Sugar instructs each team to organise an exclusive late-night themed event, offering attendees a guided VIP tour of their venue, along with food and entertainment. Titan host a "fantasy island"-themed event at the London Sea Life Centre and achieve good ticket sales. They receive favourable feedback on their entertainment and canapes, despite selling few hot meals and providing a poor VIP tour. Nebula host a casino-themed event at Madame Tussauds and while their VIP tour is well received, they lack a clear ticket pricing strategy, provide poor canapes, and make a mistake with hot food sales that see many guests receive these for free. Titan secure victory, leaving Nebula to face questions over the mistakes they made. Of the final three, Paul Sullivan is fired for his poor leadership and decisions in the task, and for his aggressive attitude towards the other candidates.
| 163 | 9 | "Virtual Reality Game" | 1 December 2016 | 6.57 |
The teams must create a brand-new virtual reality video game and pitch their concept to gaming experts at London Comic Con. Nebula create a space-themed adventure game in which players seek out a lost space pet. Despite issues with the branding and game design, their concept is well received. Titan focus on an underwater-themed puzzle game in which players find and piece together various shells, but present a disorganised pitch and their audience ultimately dislike their concept's overall design. Voting by the experts soon reveals Nebula to be the winner, leaving Titan to face questions over their flawed design. In the losing team, Dillon St. Paul is dismissed for his unsuitable personality and limited skill set, while Sofiane Khelfa is fired for his poor pitching and management skills, and his overall track record.
| 164 | 10 | "Gin" | 8 December 2016 | 7.02 |
The teams create their own brand of gin, which they must pitch to major drink retailers. Titan create a spicy gin with an orange hue, but this leaves a bad impression on retailers who are puzzled by the colour, the lack of information on the bottle's label and the negative connotations of the branding. Nebula create a fruity gin, which is well-received, and they win the task overall. Of the final three, Trishna Thakrar is fired for solely contributing to the colouring of the team's gin, refusing to accept responsibility for her mistakes, undermining the team leader's authority, and her negative attitude in the task.
| 165 | SP–1 | "The Final Five" | 13 December 2016 | N/A |
As this year's series draws closer to its finale, this special episode profiles the five remaining candidates.
| 166 | 11 | "Interviews" | 15 December 2016 | N/A |
After facing ten tasks as teams, the five remaining candidates now compete as individuals in their next task – a series of tough, gruelling interviews with four of Lord Sugar's most trusted associates. Grainne McCoy is fired for a questionable proposal and lack of business experience. Jessica Cunningham is fired for her poor track record and a serious flaw in her proposal, and Frances Bishop is fired for her lack of appropriate business skills and the limited scaleability of her proposal. Of the remaining two, Alana Spencer is praised for improving over the course of the process, while Courtney Wood is noted for having good business potential.
| 167 | SP–2 | "Why I Fired Them" | 16 December 2016 | N/A |
As the final looms, Lord Sugar takes a look back on the process so far. He relives all of the mistakes, doomed decisions, and other notable events that occurred during the process, and provides his reasons behind each firing.
| 168 | 12 | "The Final" | 18 December 2016 | 7.62 |
The final two candidates present their business proposals to an audience of business and industry experts. Alana presents her plan for a nationwide bakery brand, receiving positive feedback on her packaging and the USP of her branding but faces concerns over her ability to run a large business. Courtney presents his idea for a new brand of novelty goods, receiving praise for his ability to produce new products at a quick pace. However, he faces questions over his proposal's costs and copyright concerns. Based on feedback from these presentations, Lord Sugar crowns Alana Spencer his new business partner.

== Ratings ==
Official episode viewing figures are from BARB.

| Episode no. | Air date | 7-day viewers (millions) | 28-day viewers (millions) | BBC One weekly ranking |
|---|---|---|---|---|
| 1 | 6 October 2016 | 7.37 | 7.60 | 4 |
| 2 | 13 October 2016 | 7.40 | 7.59 | 5 |
| 3 | 20 October 2016 | 7.37 | 7.49 | 4 |
| 4 | 27 October 2016 | 7.65 | 7.83 | 4 |
| 5 | 3 November 2016 | 7.37 | 7.51 | 4 |
| 6 | 10 November 2016 | 7.26 | 7.41 | 6 |
| 7 | 17 November 2016 | 6.60 | 6.80 | 8 |
| 8 | 24 November 2016 | 6.40 | 6.59 | 10 |
| 9 | 1 December 2016 | 6.38 | 6.57 | 10 |
| 10 | 8 December 2016 | 6.89 | 7.02 | 4 |
| 11 | 15 December 2016 | 7.24 | 7.37 | 4 |
| 12 | 18 December 2016 | 7.45 | 7.62 | 3 |
