= Passages Malibu =

For-profit addiction treatment facility

Coordinates: 34°1′37″N 118°46′4″W

Passages Malibu Addiction Treatment Center
- Type: Private
- Industry: Rehabilitation
- Founded: 2001
- Headquarters: Malibu, California, United States
- Key people: Chris Prentiss; Pax Prentiss
- Number of employees: 100+
- Website: Passages Malibu Addiction Treatment Center

Passages Malibu Addiction Treatment Center, known as Passages Malibu, is a for-profit addiction treatment facility located in Malibu, California and founded by Pax and Chris Prentiss in 2001. Passages Ventura opened in 2009 in Port Hueneme, California.

== History and founders ==
The center was founded by a father and son, Chris and Pax Prentiss. Chris Prentiss is a former real estate developer with no formal training in rehabilitation or medicine.

Passages operates on the principle that people become addicted to drugs and alcohol due to underlying and unresolved problems in their lives. Passages relies on one-to-one therapy sessions.

A second, less expensive facility called Passages Ventura opened in 2009 in Port Hueneme, California.

In 2012, the center had 29 beds and approximately 25% of its clients were Californians.

== Controversy ==
Passages, and the treatment method it employs, have been the subject of controversy. According to a September 2013 New York Times report, it is "the largest and most expensive" of the many rehab facilities in Malibu. Passages keeps any money that has been deposited, even if a patient exits the center before completing treatment similar to other addiction treatment facilities.

In addition, Passages' treatment philosophy is controversial both because it disputes the efficacy of multi-step treatment programs and also because the founders do not believe that addiction is a disease. Passages claims that its method produces above an 80% rehabilitation rate. However, the accuracy of these statistics has been questioned by other rehabilitation professionals, particularly because they include people who have been out of treatment for only 30 days.

In September 2015, a former director and whistleblower at the facility sued for wrongful termination after claiming that she was fired for alerting management that some staff weren't being appropriately compensated or receiving proper breaks and refusing to falsify documents relating to a patient's death in March of that same year. The plaintiff was awarded $1.8 million by a jury in August 2017.
