= Angie Best =

English model

- Born: Angela MacDonald-Janes; 26 July 1952 (age 74); Westminster, London, England
- Other name: Angie Best
- Occupations: Model; former Playboy Bunny
- Spouse: George Best (m. 1978; div. 1986)
- Children: Calum Best
- Relatives: Samantha Womack (niece)

Angela Best (née MacDonald-Janes; born 26 July 1952) is an English model and former Playboy Bunny, known as the first wife of Northern Irish professional footballer George Best.

== Biography ==
Born in Westminster, London and raised in Southend-on-Sea, Essex, Angela MacDonald-Janes was the elder daughter of Marion (née MacDonald) and Robert William Brough Janes. She has a younger sister Lynne and two half-brothers: Michael, from her father's first marriage, and Noel Robert Janus (born Janes) (1949–2009), from a previous relationship of her father. Noel's daughter is actress Samantha Womack. She became a model, and then a "Bunnygirl" at the Playboy Club in London. She was invited to New York City to model and then went to Los Angeles as a model and physical fitness trainer.

She met George Best at a dinner party in Los Angeles in 1975 when he was signing to play for the Los Angeles Aztecs, and it was "love at first sight". They moved to London in 1976. When she returned to Los Angeles, George followed and persuaded her to marry him; she did on 24 January 1978. The marriage produced son Calum in 1981, but they separated the following year and divorced in 1986 due to Best's continual alcoholism and domestic violence.

After moving to Los Angeles, Best went back to her fitness career, producing and starring in her own workout videos, and starring on television in shows and series for Sky TV and others. She coached and trained celebrity clients, including Cher, Sharon Stone and Daryl Hannah. She has written a series of books for women over 40, including one regarding menopause called A Change for the Best.

In 2000, a poorly reviewed biopic about George Best titled Best featured Patsy Kensit as Angie Best. Angie Best said of the film: "I haven't been consulted at all, even though it shows my life." In response, in 2002, Best wrote her autobiography George and Me: My Autobiography, the hook line for which was: "I didn't realise that six years of marriage would last a lifetime." She detailed the marriage and life afterwards where she claimed to have tried to remain in contact with George, offering support and advice to help him conquer his alcoholism. Despite everything George put her through, she claimed in the book: "I remain good friends with George. He is the only man I ever loved."

== Television ==
On 3 January 2017, Angie joined her son Calum Best on the 19th series of Celebrity Big Brother.
