= Bianca Gascoigne =

British model and television personality (born 1986)

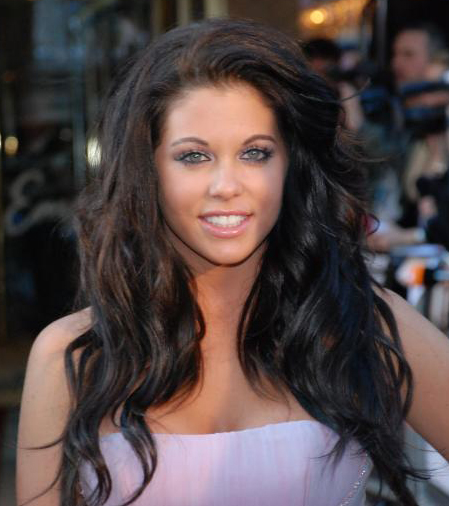
- Gascoigne at the London premiere of the film State of Play in April 2009
- Born: Bianca Jade Kyle; 28 October 1986 (age 40); Hertfordshire, England
- Occupations: Glamour model; television personality
- Modelling information
- Height: 5 ft 5 in (1.65 m)
- Eye colour: Blue

Bianca Jade Gascoigne (born 28 October 1986) is a British glamour model and television personality.

== Early life ==
Born Bianca Jade Kyle on 28 October 1986, Gascoigne is the daughter of television personality Sheryl Gascoigne (née Failes) and Colin Kyle, and the adopted daughter of former footballer Paul Gascoigne.

== Career ==
In September 2006, she was featured on the front cover of Loaded, and in January of the following year, she graced the cover of Nuts. Gascoigne also appeared on the cover of Zoo Weekly in August 2008. Additionally, she has been featured in Maxim, FHM, and various tabloid newspapers. Gascoigne posed for two calendars, one in 2020 and another in 2021.

In 2006, Gascoigne won ITV's reality TV show Love Island which was set in Fiji. In July 2008, she competed against glamour model Danielle Lloyd in the TV show Gladiators in a celebrity special, which she went on to win, supporting a charity for domestic violence. She also presented Big Brother's Big Mouth from 15 to 18 July 2008, and appeared in an episode of the BBC Three reality programme Snog Marry Avoid? during which she performed a rap to POD. In 2010, Gascoigne took part in Celebrity Coach Trip with her friend Imogen Thomas. In 2012, Gascoigne auditioned for the ninth series of The X Factor and in this programme she sang the Mary J. Blige song I'm Goin' Down, but failed to make it to bootcamp, as the judges claimed that there were already some "excellent" performers in her category and described her voice as being "mediocre". Gascoigne appeared in the nineteenth series of Channel 5 reality show Celebrity Big Brother, making it to the final vote on Day 32 and placing sixth. She participated, with Simone Di Pasquale, in the sixteenth edition of Ballando con le stelle, the Italian version of Dancing with the Stars aired by Rai 1, obtaining the second place in the final episode.
