= Westholme School =

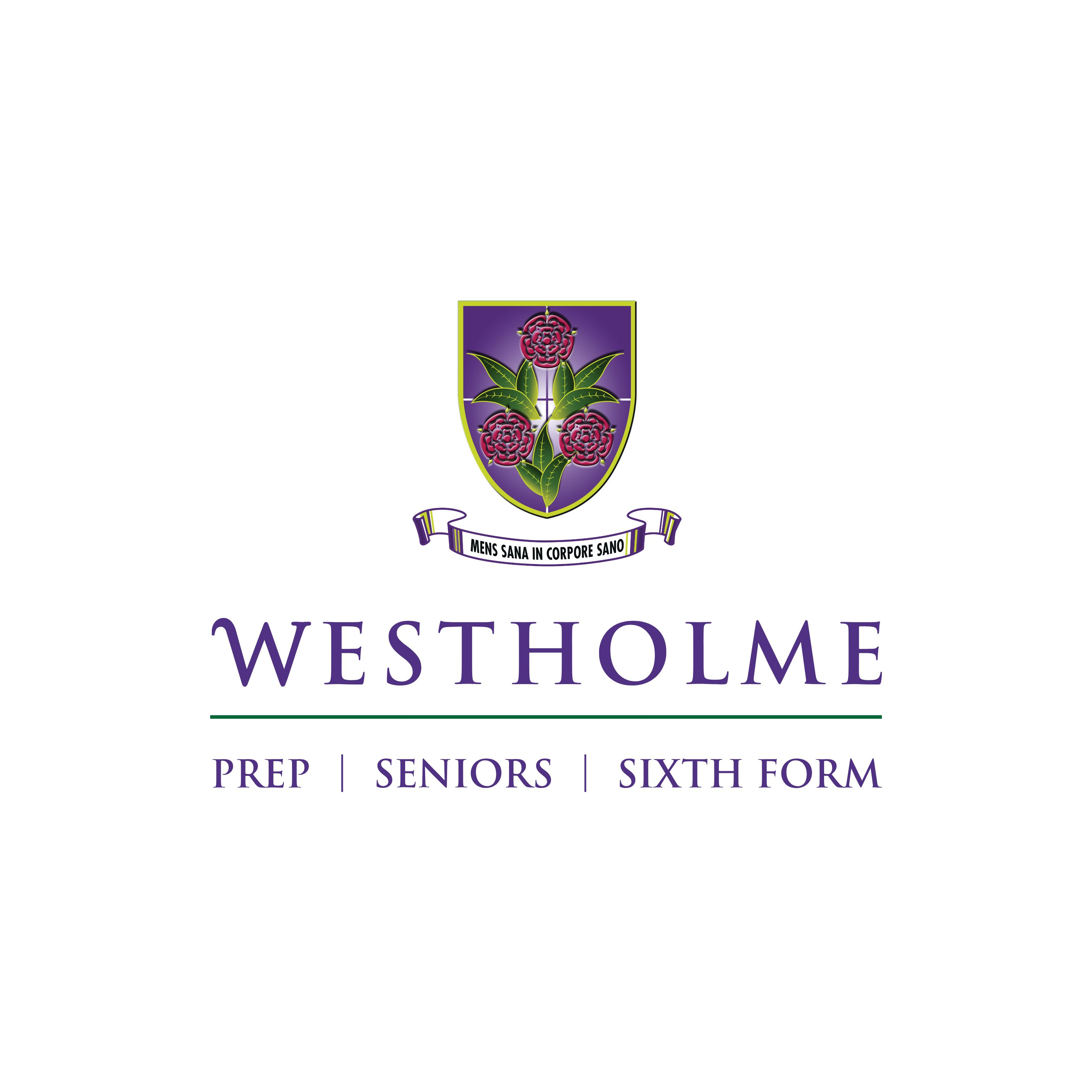

Location
- Wilmar Lodge; Meins Road; Blackburn, Lancashire, BB2 6QU; England; 53.75295°N 2.53108°W

Information
- Type: Independent school
- Motto: Mens sana in corpore sano (A healthy mind in a healthy body)
- Religious affiliation: Christian
- Established: 1923
- Founder: Emily Singleton
- Department for Education URN: 119826 Tables
- Principal: Paul Taylor
- Gender: Co-education
- Age: 3 to 18 years
- Enrolment: 767
- Houses: Calder, Longridge, Bowland, Pendle
- Colours: Purple and green
- Website: http://www.westholmeschool.com

Westholme School is an independent, coeducational school in Blackburn, Lancashire, England, founded in 1923.

== History ==
Westholme was established in 1923 by Emily Singleton as a primary school based in her parents' home (which was already named Westholme) on Preston New Road in Blackburn, Lancashire. The stated aim was to create an educational space to provide lessons for children during the Depression, given limited alternatives in the local area. The school was recognised by the British government as a formal place of education in 1940.

By 1948, Westholme had an enrolment of around 135 pupils; the growing student population led to the formation of a secondary school and a move to larger premises. As Singleton approached retirement age, she chose Arthur Rouse from the University of Salford to become the school principal.

In 1968, the Westholme School became a registered charity administered by a board of governors. The school consisted of a primary school, secondary school, and a newly-established sixth form, based at separate locations. An assembly hall, laboratories, swimming pool, sports hall, playing fields, music centre, and art studios were built on a 10-acre plot.

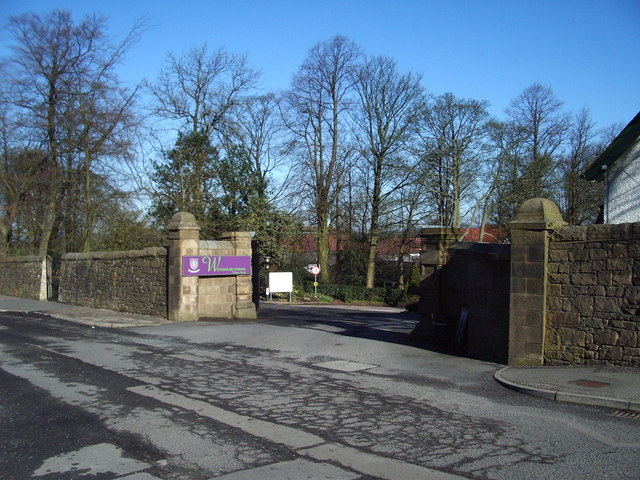
Entrance to the school premises at Wilmar Lodge

Westholme underwent significant expansion and modernisation throughout the 1990s under Principal Lillian Croston. Croston led the school for 25 years before retiring in 2013 and was succeeded by Lynne Horner later that year. Horner was succeeded by Dr. Richard Robson in January 2021. As of July 2024, Paul Taylor is the current principal.

Westholme became fully coeducational in September 2018 and currently accepts children between the ages of 3 and 18. As of 2025, around 750 girls and boys attend the school from areas throughout Lancashire. The school is subject to periodic inspections by the Independent Schools Council (ISC), most recently performed in 2024. Westholme won the Independent School of the Year Award in 2023 for its Student Careers Programme and was also shortlisted for Independent School of the Year in both 2024 and 2025 for its Performing Arts. The school was additionally shortlisted by Independent School Parent magazine for Independent School of the Year 2025.

The infant and junior schools, previously located in Billinge House and Beardwood Bank, were combined and relocated to a new modern preparatory school that opened in September 2022, which is now located on the same site as the Senior School and Sixth Form campus at Wilmar Lodge.

The school is independent and charges tuition fees. Scholarships are available to pupils who satisfy various criteria for entry into Year 7, and Year 12. Applications for bursaries may be made before entry into Year 7 and Year 12, in line with the school's charitable status. The value of each bursary depends on the financial resources of the student's family, and the school's available funds.

== Sports and extracurricular activities ==
Westholme School offers sports including football, cricket, hockey, netball, cross-country, and swimming. Students use on-site facilities and local amenities such as the athletics track at Witton Park and cricket grounds at Cherry Tree Cricket Club.

Indoor facilities include a sports hall, a 20-metre swimming pool and baby pool and a fitness suite; outdoor facilities include football and hockey pitches, tennis and netball hard courts, a grass athletics track and a cross-country course.

The school promotes inter-house competitions where students compete against each other throughout the year at events such as sports days, swimming galas, and music and reading competitions. Music and drama programs are also offered, with teaching and productions in multipurpose facilities on the school campus. Theatrical productions take place every year at the school, and often involve the cooperation of the school orchestra. Past productions include Beauty & the Beast, Miss Saigon, and Phantom of the Opera. Members of the school choir have often undertaken a performing tour during the summer holidays and have performed in international locations such as Salzburg, New York City, Monte Carlo, and Paris.

Westholme partners with several sports clubs and local organisations including Accrington Stanley FC, Blackburn Rovers FC, Preston Grasshoppers RFC, Blackburn Rugby Club, and Blackburn Cathedral, where the school's carol services are held annually.

== Notable alumni ==
- Jessica Cunningham, businesswoman and actress
- Helen Flanagan, actress
- Seema Kennedy, former head girl and Conservative politician
- Charlotte OC, singer–songwriter
- Anne Savage, DJ
- Sophie Scott, neuroscientist and deputy director of UCL's Institute of Cognitive Neuroscience
- Diana Vickers, singer-songwriter and actress
