= Love Island (2005 TV series) =

Former British reality dating series

- Also known as: Celebrity Love Island (2005)
- Genre: Reality
- Created by: ITV Studios
- Presented by: Patrick Kielty; Kelly Brook; Fearne Cotton
- Opening theme: "Wish I" by Jem (2005) "From Fiji with Love" by Daniel Pemberton (2006)
- Country of origin: United Kingdom
- Original language: English
- No. of series: 2
- No. of episodes: 85

Production
- Executive producers: Rachel Arnold; Natalka Znak
- Producer: Toby Gorman
- Production locations: Armstrong Island, Fiji
- Editors: Alistair Knapp; Rebecca De Young
- Running time: 30–60 minutes (inc. adverts)
- Production company: ITV Productions

Original release
- Network: ITV
- Release: 16 May 2005 – 28 August 2006

Related
- Love Island (2015)

Love Island (originally Celebrity Love Island) is a British reality television programme that was aired on ITV in 2005 and 2006. In the show, twelve single celebrities spend five weeks on an island in Fiji. The final couple remaining wins a combined £100,000.

== History ==
It was originally presented by Patrick Kielty and Kelly Brook, with Fearne Cotton taking over as female host in the second series. The first series aired in the summer of 2005, and it was won by Jayne Middlemiss and Fran Cosgrave. The second series began in July 2006, dropping Celebrity from its name. It was won by Bianca Gascoigne and series one finalist Calum Best.

The theme tune for the first series was "Wish I", performed by Jem. A specially-composed summer theme by Daniel Pemberton (later released under the title "From Fiji with Love") was used for the second series.

=== Cancellation ===
Following disappointing ratings over the two spring-summer periods, the show was cancelled by ITV's director of television, Simon Shaps, in November 2006.

=== Revival series ===
On 13 February 2015, it was announced that the show would return on ITV2 in 2015 simply called Love Island. ITV's Director of Digital and Acquisitions Angela Jain confirmed the revived show would be revamped and would see non-celebrity contestants compete to survive a public vote each week.

It was later announced that Caroline Flack would host the reboot, starting on 7 June 2015. The reboot has been a ratings success for ITV2 and the show's format has spawned into an international franchise of the same name.

== Format ==
Viewers would vote for the couple they would like to see in the "love shack" where the two would get to know one another better. In the first series, each week viewers voted celebrities off the island, but in the second, the inhabitants had the final say. The identities of those being kicked out were revealed in the elimination episodes. The prize for the final couple left standing was £50,000 each. The second series also featured the inhabitants having to cook and clean up after themselves to dispute the suggestion that they were just there for a free holiday.

== Series overview ==
| Series | Islanders | Location | Episodes | Originally released | | Winners | Average viewers (millions) |
| Series | Islanders | Location | Episodes | First released | Last released | Winners | Average viewers (millions) |
|---|---|---|---|---|---|---|---|
| 1 | 13 | Fiji | 35 | 16 May 2005 | 20 June 2005 | Jayne Middlemiss and Fran Cosgrave | 3.6 |
| 2 | 16 | Fiji | 50 | 10 July 2006 | 28 August 2006 | Bianca Gascoigne and Calum Best | 2.1 |

== Series 1 (2005) ==
The first series was broadcast during the summer of 2005 and was, along with Celebrity Love Island Live and Celebrity Love Island: Aftersun, sponsored by the new Chevrolet Matiz.

| Contestant | Occupation/Known for | Notes |
|---|---|---|
| Jayne Middlemiss | Television & radio presenter | Winner |
| Fran Cosgrave | Nightclub manager & former Westlife bodyguard | Winner |
| Calum Best | Model | |
| Paul Danan | Former Hollyoaks actor | |
| Michael Greco | Former EastEnders actor | |
| Lady Isabella Hervey | Model & socialite | |
| Du'aine Ladejo | Olympic sprinter | |
| Rebecca Loos | Glamour model | |
| Liz McClarnon | Atomic Kitten singer | |
| Lee Sharpe | Former England footballer | |
| Judi Shekoni | Model & actress | First to be evicted |
| Abi Titmuss | Former glamour model | |
| Nikki Ziering | Model & actress | (Late arrival) |

The show was marketed as a rival for Channel 4's popular reality show, Big Brother, which returned for a sixth series soon after the show's launch. Following the launch of the show, the celebrities were criticised by some viewers for being boring, and the celebrity status of some of the participants was questioned. There was some suspicion that the contestants were simply using the programme as a free holiday, and the tabloids claimed that producers held crisis meetings to figure out how to keep things interesting.

Soon afterwards, tabloid reports claimed that the show's presenters, Kelly Brook and Patrick Kielty, were engaged in a bitter feud. The problems between the pair allegedly started after Kielty told viewers on the live show that Brook had previously been involved in a relationship with one of the contestants, Paul Danan. One episode of the show attracted fewer than 2 million viewers. Producers later hired model Nikki Ziering to spice up the show.

The show was also resented by fans of long-running ITV soap Coronation Street. ITV decided to move its flagship programme from 19:30 to 20:30 on Monday nights, to provide a successful lead-in for Celebrity Love Island, in the hope of increasing ratings. Writers John Fay and Daran Little complained to the press about the treatment of the show. ITV argued that it took the decision to move the soap very seriously and only did so when absolutely necessary. A meeting was requested with ITV programming director Nigel Pickard to discuss the issue.

On 10 June 2005, although ratings were beginning to pick up, with the show close to overtaking Big Brother in popularity, a strong storm over the islands of Fiji disrupted the programme. A live eviction show had to be cancelled as six-foot waves made it impossible for crewmembers to cross over to where the celebrities were staying. Instead, ITV was forced to repeat the episode from the previous night with unseen footage.

Shekoni was the first celebrity to be voted off the show by the public. "For the short period I was there I got on with everybody and didn't have any negative experiences. But when I watch it now I just think, oh God, I had a lucky escape that I didn't end up crying in front of the cameras, or getting rejected by any of the guys, or involved in any of the arguments. I know my family are just pleased that I got out and didn't do anything to ruin my integrity and morals and didn't do anything embarrassing in there. I knew almost instantly that I didn't fancy any of them, and I think that's why I got voted out. That's fair enough because it is supposed to be the love island and I obviously hadn't found love. I'm still looking, though, and I've been out searching ever since."

== Series 2 (2006) ==
The second and final series first aired on 10 July, and ran for seven weeks, a little longer than the previous year's series. It was announced in late May 2006 that Fearne Cotton would be Kielty's new co-host with Series 1 winner Jayne Middlemiss presenting Aftersun with Matt Brown on ITV2. It also has a new sponsor, popular chocolate bar Bounty.

The show follows a format closer to that of the revival series in 2015 with new features islanders coming in each week. The first vote off also trialled the concept of islanders making the final decision who went however due to lack of full participation producers reverted to a public vote to save to determine eviction outcomes.

On 6 July the list of contestants was announced, with the news that the word "Celebrity" would be dropped from the show title, due to the inclusion of non-celebrities. Previous islanders Paul Danan and Calum Best joined as late arrivals. Both later made cameos in the first series of the revived show in 2015.

10 July–28 August, seven weeks, 17 contestants and 3 house guests:

| Contestant | Known for | Status |
|---|---|---|
| Bianca Gascoigne | Model | Winner |
| Calum Best (late arrival week 4) | Model | Winner |
| Kéllé Bryan | Former Eternal singer | Runner-up |
| Brendan Cole | Strictly Come Dancing professional | Runner-up |
| Kate Lawler | Television & radio broadcaster | Evicted: At the Final (late arrival week 6) |
| Chris Brosnan | Film director & writer | Evicted: Final Day |
| Sophie Anderton | Glamour model | Evicted: Week 7 |
| Lee Otway | Hollyoaks actor | Evicted: Week 7 |
| Colleen Shannon | Playboy model & DJ | Evicted: Week 7 |
| Shane Lynch | Former Boyzone singer | Walked: Week 5 |
| Paul Danan | Former Hollyoaks actor | Evicted: Week 5 (late arrival day 6) |
| Emma and Eve Ryan | Glamour models | Ejected: Week 4 (late arrivals week 4; ejected after 5 days in the resort) |
| Leo Ihenacho | Singer & actor | Evicted: Week 4 |
| Emily Scott | Swimwear model | Evicted: Week 3 (late arrival week 3) |
| Lady Victoria Hervey | Model & socialite | Evicted: Week 2 |
| Alicia Douvall | Glamour model | Evicted: Week 1 |

=== House guests ===
On Love Island, three house guests entered the resort for set periods of time, which was usually a contract of a week. House guests were not eligible for evictions or winning the prize fund of £50,000 at the end of the series, but were allowed to be voted into the Love Shack. As with the actual contestants they received an appearance salary.

| Contestant | Occupation/Known for | Status |
|---|---|---|
| Abs Breen | Former Five singer | Week 4 (Stayed 5 days) |
| Dennis Rodman | Former NBA Power forward | Week 3 (Stayed 4 days before quitting) |
| Steve-O | Jackass star | Week 2 (Stayed 2 days because he was not allowed the beer and chocolate which he requested) |

=== Returns ===
- In week two, in a bid to boost the ratings, the producers decided series one contestant Paul Danan would be put on Love Island as a regular contestant hoping he would provide the rating winning actions of the previous year. Danan was known by most on the island especially Lee Otway and Lady Victoria Hervey whose sister Isabella was involved with him in the first series and for a short period afterwards.
- On 7 August series one finalist Calum Best entered Love Island for the second time, where he attracted a lot of female attention, especially from Bianca Gascoigne, with whom he struck up a romance.
- After Sophie Anderton and Chris Brosnan were seen getting closer, evicted Lady Victoria Hervey returned to the Island for a day and hid in the secret suite where she confronted her friend Sophie and poured a bottle of wine over her head for moving in on her man.
- On 20 August Leo Ihenacho made a surprise return by jumping out of a pop out cake, to the resort for one night only to confront Calum and Bianca over their relationship. He left the next day. This resulted in Calum ending things with Bianca.

=== Notes ===
On 18 July, Steve-O was added to the show in an effort to boost ratings. Despite stating that he had stopped drinking, he asked for beer while on the show. On 19 July, he abruptly left Love Island because he was not allowed enough alcohol or chocolate.

Lady Victoria Hervey was voted off the show on Friday 21 July although her chosen man Chris Brosnan had been the favourite to leave. Hervey told hosts Patrick Kielty and Fearne Cotton that she hoped the relationship would continue in the real world but then had second thoughts when she was shown footage of Brosnan saying that he also liked Colleen.

Former basketball player Dennis Rodman entered the show on the third week on 27 July as a Houseguest to boost the ratings after being popular on Celebrity Big Brother 2006 in January. He flirted with Colleen Shannon and created friction with Lee Otway (who was coupled with Shannon at the time) before walking on his fourth day on 30 July out of the seven contracted until 3 August 2006. Otway, who was coupled with Shannon developed strong feelings for her, but was devastated when she revealed via a video link that she didn’t see it going anywhere and instead just wanted to be friends. Both remained on the show, but Shannon was evicted two weeks later. Otway left later in the competition in the final week.

Identical twins Emma and Eve Ryan joined the Love Island on 31 July, but were ejected from the show by producers on 4 August. No explanation was given to the public.

It was announced on 6 August that Calum Best would enter Love Island next day. Also on 6 August, it was confirmed on the Love Island website that Shane Lynch had left the island to make up with a woman back home.

On 14 August, Big Brother 3 winner Kate Lawler entered Celebrity Love Island. On final night, 28 August 2006, Kate Lawler was the last girl to be evicted before the final showdown.

The winners were Bianca Gascoigne and Calum Best, with Kéllé Bryan and Brendan Cole runners-up.

An average of 3.8 million people tuned in to watch the final, peaking at 4.4m, down from the previous year's peak figure of 5.9 million.

== Big Brother competition ==
The show did not always go head to head with Channel 4's Big Brother, as Big Brother aired at 9pm on Tuesdays, Saturdays and Sundays and only clashed on Mondays, Wednesdays, Thursdays and Fridays with Celebrity Love Island at 10pm. However, many terrestrial viewers in Wales could only watch Big Brother at a fixed 10.00pm slot every night on S4C which also broadcast the show due to many Welsh terrestrial televisions failing to receive Channel 4. Celebrity Love Island's audience was about half the size of that for Big Brother.

Calum, Bianca, Shane, Sophie, Paul, Abs and Alicia went on to star in various seasons of Celebrity Big Brother, as with Love Island, Calum appeared twice. Calum and Bianca appeared in one season together in 2017 as did Sophie and Abs in 2013. Dennis and Kate appeared on CBB/BB prior to Love Island.

When Love Island returned in 2015 on ITV2, it consistently beat Big Brother, which at this point had moved to Channel 5, in the ratings resulting in its axe in 2018, before being revived by ITV2 in 2023.

== Reception ==
In a negative review of the first series for The Guardian, Charlie Brooker writes that the show is "just a rehash of I'm A Celebrity, minus the elements that made that show successful". Brooker criticises that the show "openly sneers" at Abi Titmuss' weight, calls Paul Danan a "bell end of considerable magnitude", jokes that the Fran Cosgrave is so little well known that "he doesn't actually exist outside shows like this" and insults the presenting of Patrick Kielty and Kelly Brook, described respectively as "a man you wish would shut up before he even starts speaking, and a woman who can scarcely talk in the first place".

== See also ==
- Temptation Island
- Paradise Hotel
- Forever Eden
- Love in the Wild
