= List of Celebrity Big Brother (British TV series) housemates =

Celebrity Big Brother is a spin-off of the British reality television series Big Brother, broadcast in the UK and Ireland. Originally broadcast on Channel 4 and E4, and later on Channel 5 and 5Star, and ITV1 and ITV2 respectively, it involves a group of celebrities, called housemates, living in isolation from the outside world in a custom-built "house". The actions of the participants are recorded constantly by microphones and cameras situated in each room. Regularly, the housemates nominate two other members of the group each to face eviction; those with the most nominations face a public telephone vote, and the housemate who receives the most public votes is evicted. This procedure continues until the final day, when the viewers vote for who of the remaining participants they want to win the programme. Profits from premium-rate telephone votes are donated to charities such as Comic Relief, Centrepoint and Samaritans.

== Programme ==
Twenty-four editions of Celebrity Big Brother have been made, involving a total of 301 housemates, 8 of whom have entered twice. The programme has been the centre of controversies over the actions and inclusion of some of its housemates. For instance, viewer and People for the Ethical Treatment of Animals (PETA) complaints prompted Hertfordshire Police to remove a coat from the 2006 edition after Pete Burns claimed that it was made from gorilla fur and therefore against the Convention on International Trade in Endangered Species agreement of 1975. However, after an analysis at the Natural History Museum, it was later discovered that the coat was made from the fur of Colobus monkeys. Fellow members of parliament criticised George Galloway's participation in the same series, stating that Galloway had missed important debates regarding his constituency, Bethnal Green and Bow, and rejecting claims that Galloway took part to raise political awareness amongst the British youth. The family of Stuart Lubbock, a man who died in Michael Barrymore's swimming pool, criticised the programme makers for paying the entertainer £150,000 to participate on the programme. Germaine Greer voluntarily left the 2005 series after accusing the producers of using "superior bullying" tactics against contestants; commentators such as Graham Norton have argued that the housemates are not "actual celebrities". During the 2009 series, 527 viewers complained to Ofcom, the majority concerned about Coolio's conduct towards female contestants, but it was decided that the broadcaster's code was not breached. Comments made by Heidi Fleiss also proved controversial during the final series to air on Channel 4 of the programme in 2010; she accused Ivana Trump of smuggling drugs onto the programme, a claim that Trump's spokesperson denied, and made comments about abortion that attracted criticism.

During the 2007 series, comments directed to and made about Shilpa Shetty from Jade Goody, Danielle Lloyd, Jo O'Meara and Jack Tweed caused an international racism controversy. The British and Indian governments commented on the issue, while Ofcom decreed that Channel 4 had been guilty of "serious editorial misjudgements" after 54,000 viewers claimed that Shetty had been the victim of racial discrimination. The broadcaster was made to air a series of on-air apologies, and the programme was not included in Channel 4's 2008 schedule; it was replaced by Big Brother: Celebrity Hijack. In 2009, Channel 4's director of television Kevin Lygo announced that Big Brother "had reached a natural end point" and the 2010 edition was the final celebrity series to air on the channel. However, Channel 5 stated in April 2011 that it has signed a two-year deal with Endemol, the show's creators, to air both version of the programme for a reported £220m. The series started on 18 August 2011 and former Big Brother winner Brian Dowling replaced Davina McCall as the programme's presenter. Dowling presented the programme until January 2013, his final series being Celebrity Big Brother 11. Emma Willis presented from the twelfth series to the twenty-second series of the show. The show relaunched on ITV in March 2024, with AJ Odudu and Will Best presenting the show from its twenty-third series.

== Housemates ==
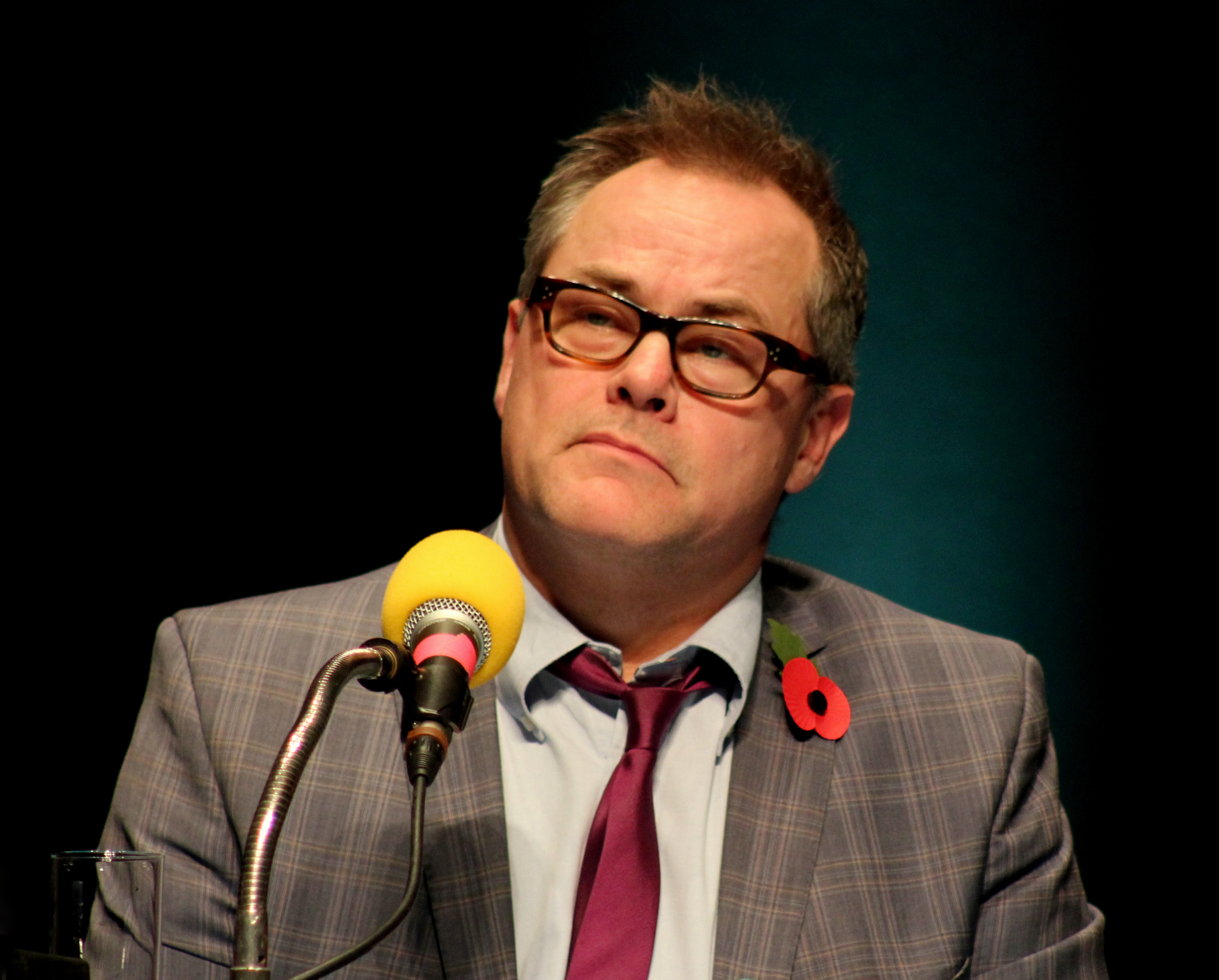
Jack Dee won the first edition of the programme.

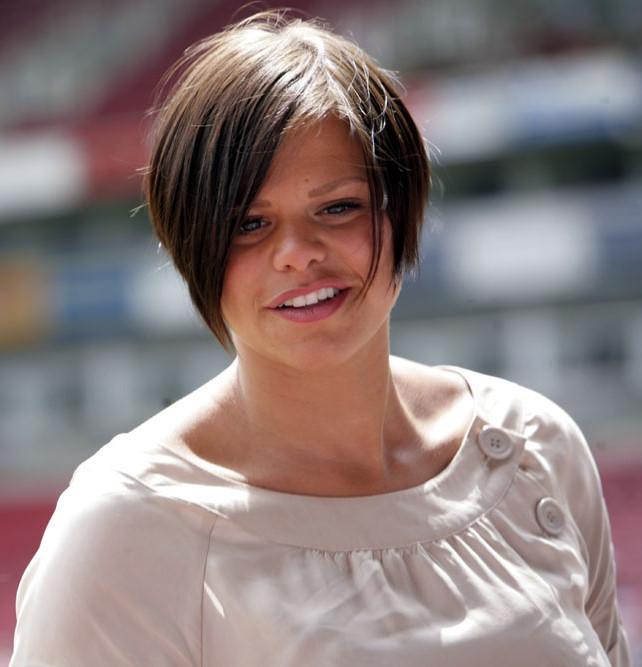
Jade Goody's involvement in a racism controversy sparked an international debate in the 2007 edition.

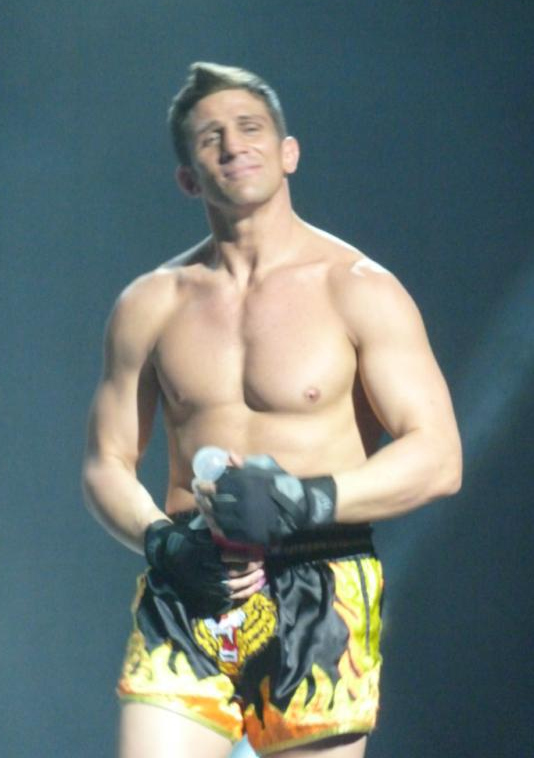
Alex Reid was the winner of the seventh and final Celebrity Big Brother to air on Channel 4.

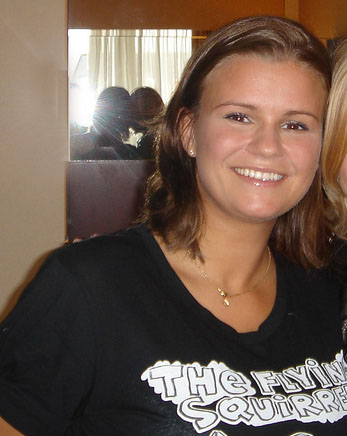
Atomic Kitten singer and reality television star Kerry Katona was the runner-up of the eighth series which was the first to air on Channel 5.

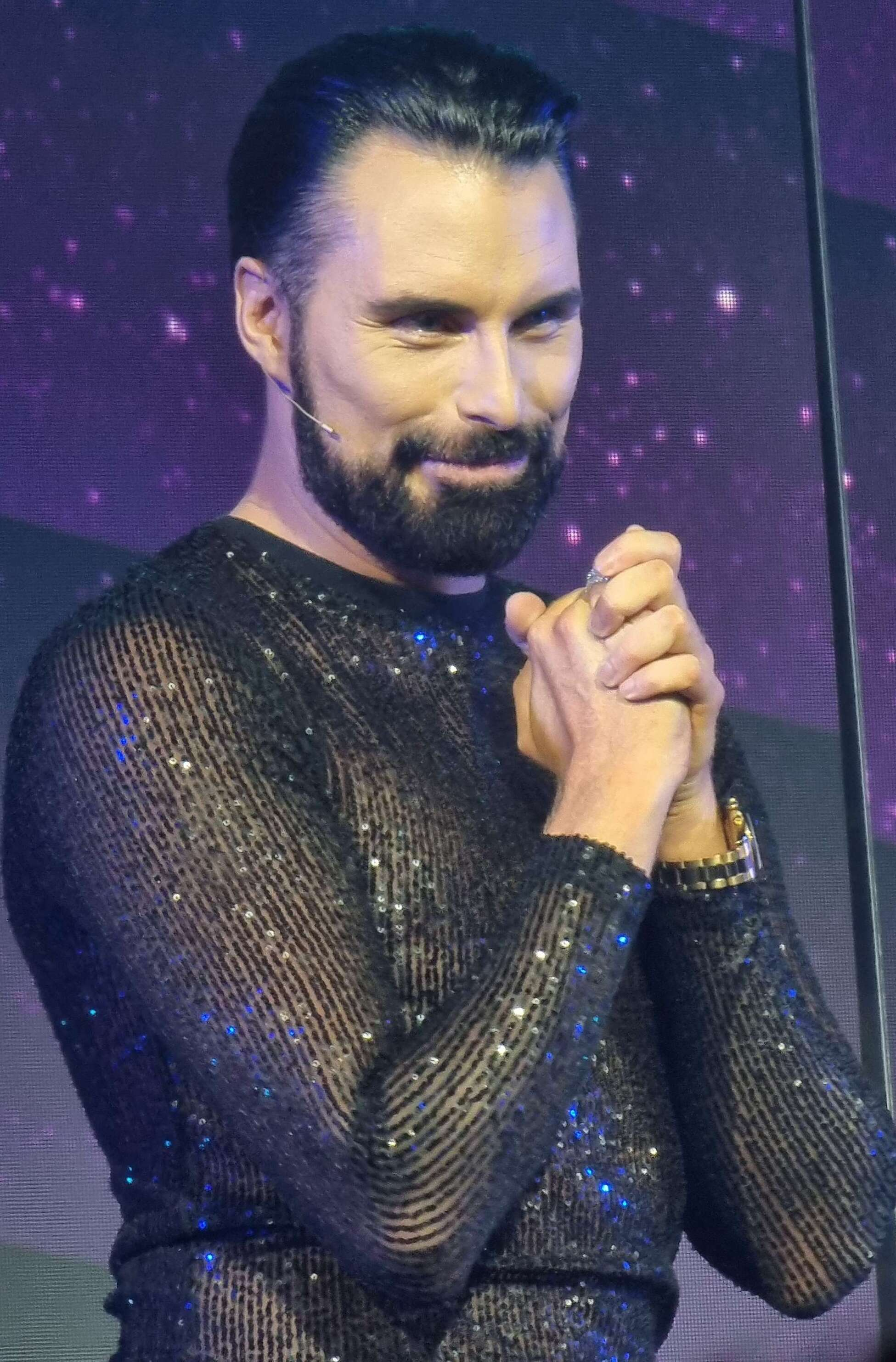
Rylan Clark, who won the eleventh series, later presented the Channel 5 after show Big Brother's Bit on the Side, and has gone on to have a successful television and radio career.

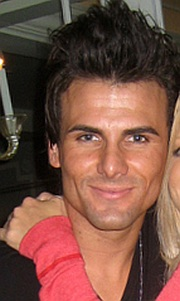
Jeremy Jackson was one of two contestants to be removed from the programme after breaching the rules in the fifteenth series. This was the first edition of Celebrity Big Brother to feature a housemate leaving the show in this manner.

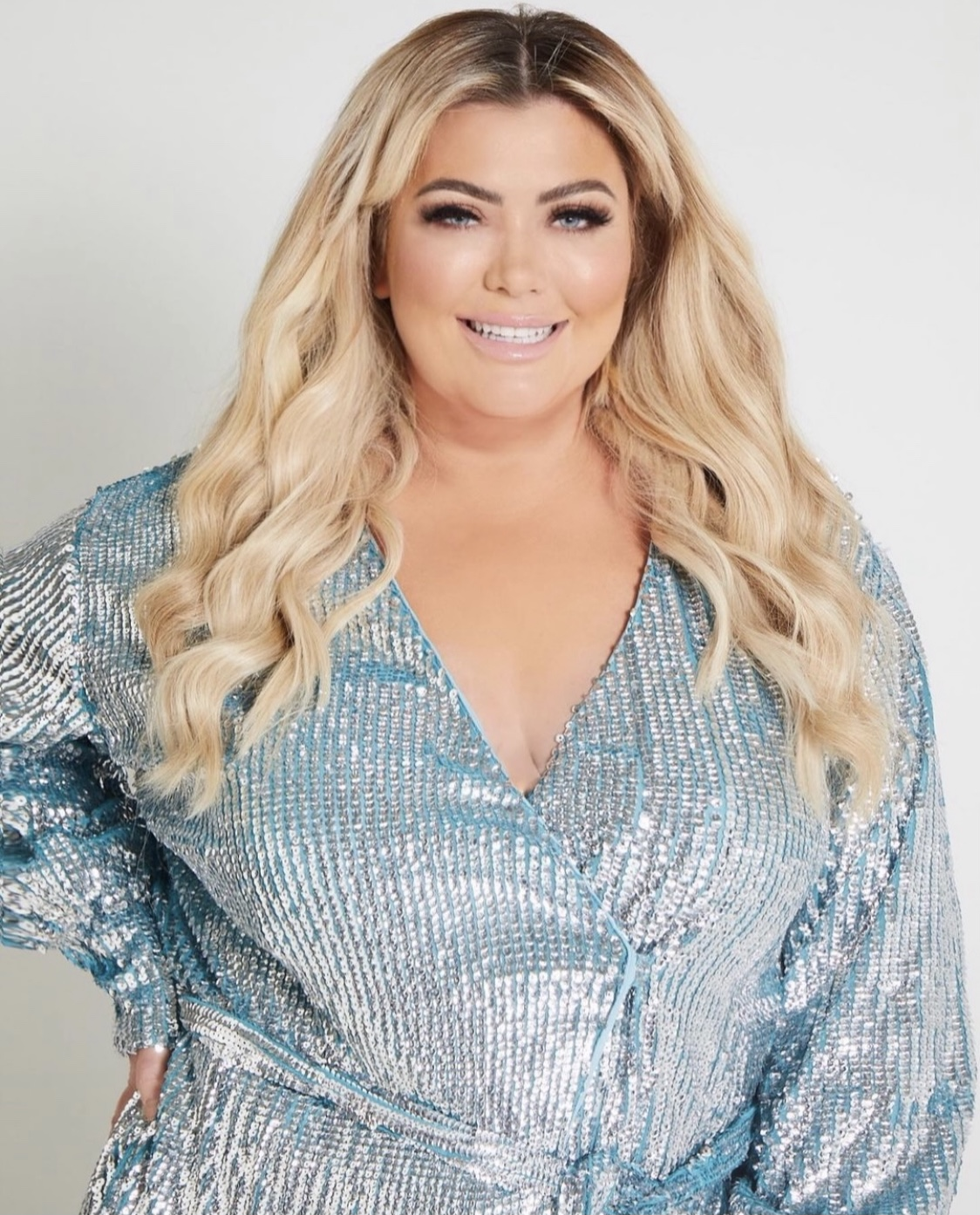
Media personality Gemma Collins was a housemate on the seventeenth series and became known for her diva outbursts, which later went viral and became the subject of numerous internet memes.

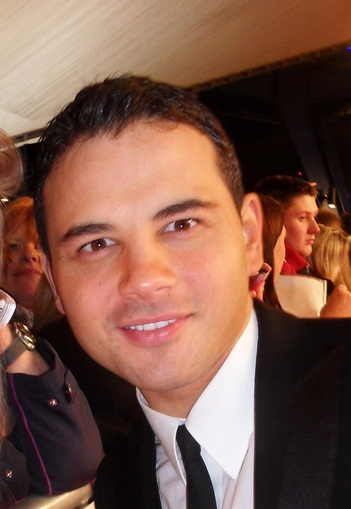
Former Coronation Street actor Ryan Thomas was the last ever Channel 5 winner after winning the twenty-second series on 10 September 2018. Celebrity Big Brother returned on ITV1 in 2024.

Winner
Runner-up
Third place
Walked
Ejected
Housemate entered for the second time

Series	Celebrity	Age	Notability	Status
1	Jack Dee	38	Comedian	1st – Winner
1	Claire Sweeney	29	Actress	2nd – Runner-up
1	Keith Duffy	26	Singer and actor	3rd – Third place
1	Anthea Turner	40	Presenter	4th – Evicted
1	Vanessa Feltz	39	Broadcaster and journalist	5th – Evicted
1	Chris Eubank	35	Boxer	6th – Evicted
2	Mark Owen	30	Singer	1st – Winner
2	Les Dennis	49	Presenter and comedian	2nd – Runner-up
2	Melinda Messenger	31	Glamour model and presenter	3rd – Third place
2	Sue Perkins	33	Comedian and presenter	4th – Evicted
2	Anne Diamond	48	Journalist and presenter	5th – Evicted
2	Goldie	37	Musician, DJ and actor	6th – Evicted
3	Bez	40	Dancer and percussionist	1st – Winner
3	Kenzie	19	Rapper	2nd – Runner-up
3	Brigitte Nielsen	41	Actress and model	3rd – Third place
3	Jeremy Edwards	33	Actor	4th – Evicted
3	Caprice	33	Model and actress	5th – Evicted
3	Lisa I'Anson	39	Presenter	6th – Evicted
3	John McCririck	64	Horse racing pundit	7th – Evicted
3	Jackie Stallone	83	Mother of Sylvester Stallone	8th – Evicted
3	Germaine Greer	65	Feminist, academic and journalist	9th – Walked
4	Chantelle Houghton	22	Non-celebrity	1st – Winner
4	Michael Barrymore	53	Comedian and presenter	2nd – Runner-up
4	Maggot	24	Rapper	3rd – Third place
4	Preston	23	Singer	4th – Evicted
4	Pete Burns	46	Singer	5th – Evicted
4	Traci Bingham	37	Actress and model	6th – Evicted
4	Dennis Rodman	44	Basketball player	7th – Evicted
4	George Galloway	51	Politician and journalist	8th – Evicted
4	Rula Lenska	57	Actress	9th – Evicted
4	Faria Alam	39	Affair with Sven-Goran Eriksson	10th – Evicted
4	Jodie Marsh	27	Glamour model	11th – Evicted
5	Shilpa Shetty	31	Actress	1st – Winner
5	Jermaine Jackson	52	Jackson family member and singer	2nd – Runner-up
5	Dirk Benedict	61	Actor	3rd – Third place
5	Ian "H" Watkins	30	Singer	4th – Evicted
5	Danielle Lloyd	23	Glamour model and Miss Great Britain	5th – Evicted
5	Jack Tweed	19	Boyfriend of Jade Goody	6th – Evicted
5	Cleo Rocos	44	Actress	7th – Evicted
5	Jo O'Meara	27	Singer	8th – Evicted
5	Jade Goody	25	Reality TV star	9th – Evicted
5	Carole Malone	52	Journalist and broadcaster	10th – Evicted
5	Leo Sayer	58	Singer	11th – Walked
5	Jackiey Budden	49	Mother of Jade Goody	12th – Evicted
5	Ken Russell	79	Director	13th – Walked
5	Donny Tourette	25	Singer	14th – Walked
6	Ulrika Jonsson	41	Presenter	1st – Winner
6	Terry Christian	45	Presenter	2nd – Runner-up
6	Coolio	45	Musician	3rd – Third place
6	Verne Troyer	40	Actor	4th – Evicted
6	Ben Adams	27	Singer	5th – Evicted
6	Tommy Sheridan	44	Politician	6th – Evicted
6	La Toya Jackson	52	Jackson family member and singer	7th – Evicted
6	Michelle Heaton	28	Singer	8th – Evicted
6	Mutya Buena	23	Singer	9th – Walked
6	Tina Malone	45	Actress	10th – Evicted
6	Lucy Pinder	25	Glamour model	11th – Evicted
7	Alex Reid	34	Mixed martial artist	1st – Winner
7	Dane Bowers	30	Singer	2nd – Runner-up
7	Vinnie Jones	44	Actor and ex-footballer	3rd – Third place
7	Jonas Altberg	25	Singer, record producer and DJ	4th – Evicted
7	Stephanie Beacham	62	Actress	5th – Evicted
7	Nicola Tappenden	27	Glamour model	6th – Evicted
7	Ivana Trump	60	Model and socialite	7th – Evicted
7	Sisqó	31	Singer	8th – Evicted
7	Stephen Baldwin	43	Actor	9th – Evicted
7	Lady Sovereign	24	Rapper	10th – Evicted
7	Heidi Fleiss	44	Former pimp and TV personality	11th – Evicted
7	Katia Ivanova	21	Ex-girlfriend of Ronnie Wood	12th – Evicted
8	Paddy Doherty	52	Reality TV star	1st – Winner
8	Kerry Katona	30	Media personality and singer	2nd – Runner-up
8	Jedward	19	Singers	3rd – Third place
8	Amy Childs	21	Reality TV star	4th – Evicted
8	Lucien Laviscount	19	Actor	5th – Evicted
8	Darryn Lyons	45	Paparazzo	6th – Evicted
8	Bobby Sabel	25	Model	7th – Evicted
8	Tara Reid	35	Actress and model	8th – Evicted
8	Pamela Bach Hasselhoff	47	Actress, ex-wife of David Hasselhoff	9th – Evicted
8	Sally Bercow	41	Wife of John Bercow	10th – Evicted
9	Denise Welch	53	Actress and TV panellist	1st – Winner
9	Frankie Cocozza	18	Singer	2nd – Runner-up
9	Gareth Thomas	37	Rugby player	3rd – Third place
9	Michael Madsen	54	Actor, poet and photographer	4th – Evicted
9	Karissa and Kristina Shannon	22	Playboy playmates and glamour models	5th – Evicted
9	Romeo	31	Rapper	6th – Evicted
9	Nicola McLean	30	Glamour model and media personality	7th – Evicted
9	Natalie Cassidy	28	Actress and TV personality	8th – Evicted
9	Kirk Norcross	23	Reality TV star	9th – Evicted
9	Georgia Salpa	26	Model	10th – Evicted
9	Natasha Giggs	29	Affair with Ryan Giggs	11th – Evicted
9	Andrew Stone	39	Reality TV star	12th – Evicted
10	Julian Clary	53	Comedian	1st – Winner
10	Coleen Nolan	47	Singer and TV presenter	2nd – Runner-up
10	Martin Kemp	50	Singer and actor	3rd – Third place
10	The Situation	30	Reality TV star	4th – Evicted
10	Ashley McKenzie	21	Judoka	5th – Evicted
10	MC Harvey	33	Rapper	6th – Evicted
10	Julie Goodyear	70	Actress	7th – Evicted
10	Prince Lorenzo	40	Italian prince and entrepreneur	8th – Evicted
10	Danica Thrall	24	Glamour model and TV personality	9th – Evicted
10	Samantha Brick	41	Journalist and writer	10th – Evicted
10	Rhian Sugden	25	Glamour model	11th – Evicted
10	Cheryl Fergison	46	Actress	12th – Evicted
10	Jasmine Lennard	27	Fashion model	13th – Evicted
11	Rylan Clark	24	Singer	1st – Winner
11	Heidi Montag	26	Reality TV stars	2nd – Runner-up
11	Spencer Pratt	29	Reality TV stars	2nd – Runner-up
11	Ryan Moloney	33	Actor	3rd – Third place
11	Claire Richards	35	Singer	4th – Evicted
11	Razor Ruddock	44	Ex-footballer and TV personality	5th – Evicted
11	Tricia Penrose	42	Actress and singer	6th – Evicted
11	Frankie Dettori	42	Jockey	7th – Evicted
11	Gillian Taylforth	57	Actress	8th – Evicted
11	Lacey Banghard	20	Glamour model	9th – Evicted
11	Sam Robertson	27	Actor	10th – Evicted
11	Paula Hamilton	51	Supermodel	11th – Evicted
12	Charlotte Crosby	23	Reality TV star	1st – Winner
12	Abz Love	34	Singer	2nd – Runner-up
12	Lauren Harries	35	Media personality	3rd – Third place
12	Carol McGiffin	53	TV presenter and journalist	4th – Evicted
12	Mario Falcone	25	Reality TV star	5th – Evicted
12	Vicky Entwistle	44	Actress	6th – Evicted
12	Louie Spence	44	Dancer and TV personality	7th – Evicted
12	Courtney Stodden	18	TV and media personality	8th – Evicted
12	Bruce Jones	60	Actor	9th – Evicted
12	Dustin Diamond	36	Actor	10th – Evicted
12	Sophie Anderton	36	Model and reality TV star	11th – Evicted
12	Ron Atkinson	74	Former football manager and pundit	12th – Evicted
12	Danielle Marr	33	Reality TV star	13th – Evicted
13	Jim Davidson	60	Comedian and TV presenter	1st – Winner
13	Dappy	26	Rapper	2nd – Runner-up
13	Ollie Locke	26	Reality TV star	3rd – Third place
13	Luisa Zissman	26	Reality TV star	4th – Evicted
13	Sam Faiers	23	Reality TV star	5th – Evicted
13	Casey Batchelor	29	Glamour model	6th – Evicted
13	Lee Ryan	30	Singer	7th – Evicted
13	Linda Nolan	54	Singer	8th – Evicted
13	Liz Jones	55	Journalist and columnist	9th – Evicted
13	Lionel Blair	85	Actor	10th – Evicted
13	Jasmine Waltz	31	Media personality	11th – Evicted
13	Evander Holyfield	51	Boxer	12th – Evicted
14	Gary Busey	70	Actor	1st – Winner
14	Audley Harrison	42	Heavyweight boxer	2nd – Runner-up
14	James Jordan	36	Professional dancer	3rd – Third place
14	George Gilbey	30	Reality TV star	4th – Evicted
14	Dee Kelly	43	Reality TV star	5th – Evicted
14	Edele Lynch	35	Singer	6th – Evicted
14	Lauren Goodger	27	Reality TV star	7th – Evicted
14	Ricci Guarnaccio	27	Reality TV star	8th – Evicted
14	Kellie Maloney	61	Boxing manager and former UKIP politician	9th – Evicted
14	Stephanie Pratt	28	Reality TV star	10th – Evicted
14	Frenchy Morgan	38	Model, actress and TV personality	11th – Evicted
14	Claire King	52	Actress	12th – Walked
14	Leslie Jordan	59	Actor	13th – Evicted
14	David McIntosh	28	Model and Kelly Brook's fiancé	14th – Evicted
15	Katie Price	36	TV personality and glamour model	1st – Winner
15	Katie Hopkins	39	TV personality and columnist	2nd – Runner-up
15	Calum Best	33	Model and TV personality	3rd – Third place
15	Keith Chegwin	57	Actor and presenter	4th – Evicted
15	Michelle Visage	46	Singer and presenter	5th – Evicted
15	Perez Hilton	36	Blogger and TV personality	6th – Evicted
15	Kavana	37	Singer	7th – Evicted
15	Cami-Li	26	Model	8th – Evicted
15	Nadia Sawalha	50	Actress and presenter	9th – Evicted
15	Patsy Kensit	46	Actress	10th – Evicted
15	Alicia Douvall	35	Media personality	11th – Evicted
15	Alexander O'Neal	61	Singer	12th – Walked
15	Chloe Goodman	21	Reality TV star	13th – Evicted
15	Ken Morley	71	Actor	14th – Ejected
15	Jeremy Jackson	34	Actor	15th – Ejected
16	James Hill	28	Reality TV star	1st – Winner
16	Austin Armacost	27	Reality TV star	2nd – Runner-up
16	Natasha Hamilton	33	Singer	3rd – Third place
16	Bobby Davro	56	Comedian	4th – Evicted
16	Stevi Ritchie	34	Singers & Reality TV stars	5th – Evicted
16	Chloe-Jasmine Whichello	26	Singers & Reality TV stars	5th – Evicted
16	Sherrie Hewson	64	Actress	6th – Evicted
16	Janice Dickinson	60	Model	7th – Evicted
16	Jenna Jameson	41	Porn star	8th – Evicted
16	Farrah Abraham	24	Reality TV star	9th – Evicted
16	Gail Porter	44	TV presenter	10th – Evicted
16	Fatman Scoop	46	Rapper	11th – Evicted
16	Chris Ellison	68	Actor	12th – Evicted
16	Daniel Baldwin	54	Actor	13th – Evicted
16	Tila Tequila	33	Internet personality and reality TV star	14th – Ejected
17	Scotty T	27	Reality TV star	1st – Winner
17	Stephanie Davis	22	Actress	2nd – Runner-up
17	Darren Day	47	Actor and singer	3rd – Third place
17	Tiffany Pollard	33	Reality TV star	4th – Evicted
17	Danniella Westbrook	42	Actress	5th – Evicted
17	John Partridge	44	Actor	6th – Evicted
17	Gemma Collins	34	Reality TV star	7th – Evicted
17	Jeremy McConnell	25	Reality TV star and model	8th – Evicted
17	Christopher Maloney	38	Singer	9th – Evicted
17	Megan McKenna	23	Reality TV star	10th – Evicted
17	Kristina Rihanoff	38	Professional dancer	11th – Evicted
17	Angie Bowie	66	Ex-wife of David Bowie	12th – Walked
17	David Gest	62	Producer and TV personality	13th – Walked
17	Nancy Dell'Olio	54	Ex-girlfriend of Sven-Göran Eriksson	14th – Evicted
17	Jonathan Cheban	42	Reality TV star	15th – Walked
17	Winston McKenzie	59	Former boxer and UKIP candidate	16th – Evicted
18	Stephen Bear	26	Reality TV star	1st – Winner
18	Ricky Norwood	28	Actor	2nd – Runner-up
18	Renee Graziano	47	Reality TV star	3rd – Third place
18	Marnie Simpson	24	Reality TV star	4th – Evicted
18	Aubrey O'Day	32	Singer and reality TV star	5th – Evicted
18	Frankie Grande	33	Internet personality and half-brother of Ariana Grande	6th – Evicted
18	Samantha Fox	50	Model and singer	7th – Evicted
18	Katie Waissel	30	Singer	8th – Evicted
18	James Whale	65	Radio broadcaster	9th – Evicted
18	Lewis Bloor	26	Reality TV star	10th – Evicted
18	Heavy D	43	Reality TV star	11th – Evicted
18	Chloe Khan	25	Media personality	12th – Evicted
18	Saira Khan	46	TV presenter	13th – Evicted
18	Grant Bovey	55	Media personality and ex-husband of Anthea Turner	14th – Evicted
18	Christopher Biggins	67	Actor and TV presenter	15th – Ejected
19	Coleen Nolan	51	Singer, TV presenter and CBB10 housemate	1st – Winner
19	Jedward	25	Singers and CBB8 housemates	2nd – Runner-up
19	Kim Woodburn	74	Television presenter and expert cleaner	3rd – Third place
19	James Cosmo	68	Actor	4th – Evicted
19	Nicola McLean	35	Model, media personality and CBB9 housemate	5th – Evicted
19	Bianca Gascoigne	30	Model and TV personality	6th – Evicted
19	Calum Best	35	Model, TV personality and CBB15 housemate	7th – Evicted
19	Jamie O'Hara	30	Footballer	8th – Evicted
19	Heidi Montag	30	Reality TV stars and CBB11 housemates	9th – Evicted
19	Spencer Pratt	33	Reality TV stars and CBB11 housemates	9th – Evicted
19	Jessica Cunningham	29	Reality TV star	10th – Evicted
19	Stacy Francis	47	Singer and reality TV star	11th – Evicted
19	Chloe Ferry	21	Reality TV star	12th – Evicted
19	James Jordan	38	Professional dancer and CBB14 housemate	13th – Evicted
19	Jasmine Waltz	34	Media personality and CBB13 housemate	14th – Evicted
19	Austin Armacost	28	Reality TV star and CBB16 housemate	15th – Evicted
19	Angie Best	64	Model and ex-wife of George Best	16th – Evicted
19	Brandon Block	49	DJ	17th – Walked
19	Ray J	35	Singer and TV personality	18th – Walked
20	Sarah Harding	35	Singer and actress	1st – Winner
20	Amelia Lily	22	Singer and actress	2nd – Runner-up
20	Sam Thompson	24	Reality TV star	3rd – Third place
20	Derek Acorah	67	Spiritual medium	4th – Evicted
20	Chad Johnson	29	Reality TV star	5th – Evicted
20	Jemma Lucy	29	Reality TV star	6th – Evicted
20	Shaun Williamson	51	Actor	7th – Evicted
20	Helen Lederer	62	Comedian and actress	8th – Evicted
20	Sandi Bogle	52	Reality TV star	9th – Evicted
20	Paul Danan	39	Actor	10th – Evicted
20	Brandi Glanville	44	Reality TV star	11th – Evicted
20	Jordan Davies	25	Reality TV star	12th – Evicted
20	Trisha Paytas	29	Internet personality	13th – Walked
20	Karthik Nagesan	34	Reality TV star	14th – Evicted
20	Marissa Jade	32	Reality TV star	15th – Evicted
21	Shane Jenek/Courtney Act	35	Reality TV star, drag queen and singer	1st – Winner
21	Ann Widdecombe	70	Politician	2nd – Runner-up
21	Shane Lynch	41	Singer	3rd – Third place
21	Jess Impiazzi	28	Reality TV star	4th – Evicted
21	Wayne Sleep	69	Dancer	5th – Evicted
21	Amanda Barrie	82	Actress	6th – Evicted
21	Malika Haqq	34	Reality TV star	7th – Evicted
21	Ashley James	30	Reality TV star	8th – Evicted
21	Daniel O'Reilly	33	Comedian	9th – Evicted
21	Jonny Mitchell	26	Reality TV star	10th – Evicted
21	Andrew Brady	27	Reality TV star	11th – Evicted
21	Ginuwine	47	Singer	12th – Evicted
21	John Barnes	54	Footballer	13th – Evicted
21	Maggie Oliver	62	Detective constable	14th – Evicted
21	Rachel Johnson	52	Journalist and presenter	15th – Evicted
21	India Willoughby	52	Newsreader	16th – Evicted
22	Ryan Thomas	34	Actor	1st – Winner
22	Kirstie Alley	67	Actress	2nd – Runner-up
22	Dan Osborne	27	Reality TV star	3rd – Third place
22	Nick Leeson	51	Rogue trader	4th – Evicted
22	Sally Morgan	66	Psychic	5th – Evicted
22	Gabby Allen	26	Reality TV star	6th – Evicted
22	Hardeep Singh Kohli	49	Comedian and presenter	7th – Evicted
22	Jermaine Pennant	35	Footballer	8th – Evicted
22	Roxanne Pallett	35	Actress	9th – Walked
22	Ben Jardine	37	Reality TV star	10th – Evicted
22	Chloe Ayling	21	Model	11th – Evicted
22	Rodrigo Alves	35	Media personality	12th – Ejected
22	Natalie Nunn	33	Reality TV star	13th – Evicted
23	David Potts	30	Reality TV star	1st – Winner
23	Nikita Kuzmin	26	Professional dancer	2nd – Runner-up
23	Colson Smith	25	Actor	3rd – Third place
23	Louis Walsh	71	Music manager and TV personality	4th – Evicted
23	Fern Britton	66	TV presenter and author	5th – Evicted
23	Bradley Riches	22	Actor	6th – Evicted
23	Zeze Millz	34	Presenter	7th – Evicted
23	Marisha Wallace	38	Actress and singer	8th – Evicted
23	Ekin-Su Cülcüloğlu	29	Reality TV star and actress	9th – Evicted
23	Levi Roots	65	Musician and businessman	10th – Evicted
23	Lauren Simon	51	Reality TV star	11th – Evicted
23	Gary Goldsmith	58	Uncle of Catherine, Princess of Wales	12th – Evicted
24	Jack P. Shepherd	37	Actor	1st – Winner
24	Danny Beard	32	Drag queen	2nd – Runner-up
24	JoJo Siwa	21	Singer, dancer and actress	3rd – Third place
24	Donna Preston	38	Actress and comedian	4th – Evicted
24	Chesney Hawkes	53	Actor and singer	5th – Evicted
24	Chris Hughes	32	Reality TV star and presenter	6th – Evicted
24	Patsy Palmer	52	Actress and DJ	7th – Evicted
24	Ella Rae Wise	24	Reality TV star	8th – Evicted
24	Angellica Bell	49	TV and radio presenter	9th – Evicted
24	Daley Thompson	66	Former decathlete	10th – Evicted
24	Trisha Goddard	67	TV presenter	11th – Evicted
24	Mickey Rourke	72	Actor and former boxer	12th – Ejected
24	Michael Fabricant	74	Politician	13th – Evicted

=== Notes ===
- Ages at the time the celebrity entered the house

== Guests ==
On some occasions, celebrities entered the house for a short period of time as guests.

Series	Celebrity	Notability	Ref(s)
4	Jimmy Savile	Television presenter	
5	John and Sylvia Caddock	Parents of Jackiey Budden, grandparents of Jade Goody	
6	Michelle Marsh	Glamour model	
6	Michael Barrymore	TV presenter, comedian and CBB4 housemate	
6	Chesney Hawkes	Singer and actor	
6	Alice Barry	Shameless actress	
6	Rebecca Ryan	Shameless actress	
6	Nikki Grahame	BB7 housemate	
7	Barry Fry	Football manager	
7	Edward	Lionel Richie impersonator	
7	Davina McCall	TV presenter (Big Brother and Celebrity Big Brother)	
8	Mohamed Al-Fayed	Businessman	
8	Marco Pierre White	Chef	
8	Christopher Mintz-Plasse	Actor	
8	Anton Yelchin	Actor	
9	Jodie Marsh	Glamour model and CBB4 housemate	
9	Jedward	Singers and CBB8 housemates	
9	Aldo Zilli	Chef	
10	Marilyn Galsworthy	Actress and Jasmine Lennard's mother	
11	Paula Hamilton	Supermodel and ex-housemate	
11	Jamie East	TV presenter	
12	Doug Hutchison	Actor and Courtney Stodden's husband	
12	Vanessa Feltz	Broadcaster, journalist and CBB1 and Ultimate Big Brother housemate	
12	Rylan Clark	TV personality, CBB11 housemate and Bit on the Side host	
12	Danielle Marr	Reality TV star and ex-housemate	
12	Sophie Anderton	Model, reality TV star and ex-housemate	
13	Antony Costa	Members of Blue	
13	Duncan James	Members of Blue	
13	Simon Webbe	Members of Blue	
13	Jasmine Waltz	American media personality, ex-housemate	
13	Emma Willis	TV presenter (Big Brother and Celebrity Big Brother)	
15	Emma Willis	TV presenter (Big Brother and Celebrity Big Brother)	
15	Eamonn Holmes	TV presenter	
15	James Jordan	Professional dancer and CBB14 housemate	
16	Paul Burrell	Former British Royal Household servant	
16	Jennie Bond	Journalist and TV presenter	
16	Emma Willis	TV presenter (Big Brother and Celebrity Big Brother)	
16	Eamonn Holmes	Television presenter	
17	Gillian McKeith	Nutritionist, author and television presenter	
17	Vanessa Feltz	Broadcaster, Journalist and CBB1 and Ultimate Big Brother housemate	
17	Luisa Zissman	Reality TV star and CBB13 housemate	
17	Megan McKenna	Reality TV star and ex-housemate	
17	Rylan Clark	TV personality, CBB11 housemate and Bit on the Side host	
17	Vicky Pattison	Reality TV star	
17	Joe Swash	Actor	
18	Emma Willis	TV presenter (Big Brother and Celebrity Big Brother)	
18	Sophie Kasaei	Reality TV star	
18	Lillie Lexie Gregg	Media personality and Reality TV star	
19	Austin Armacost	Reality TV star and ex-housemate	
19	John McCririck	Horse racing pundit and CBB3 and Ultimate Big Brother housemate	
19	Luisa Zissman	Reality TV star and CBB13 housemate	
19	Saira Khan	TV presenter and CBB18 housemate	
19	Vanessa Feltz	Broadcaster, journalist and CBB1 and Ultimate Big Brother housemate	
23	Sharon Osbourne	Television personality and music manager	
23	Sinitta	Singer and television personality	

== Gallery of winners ==
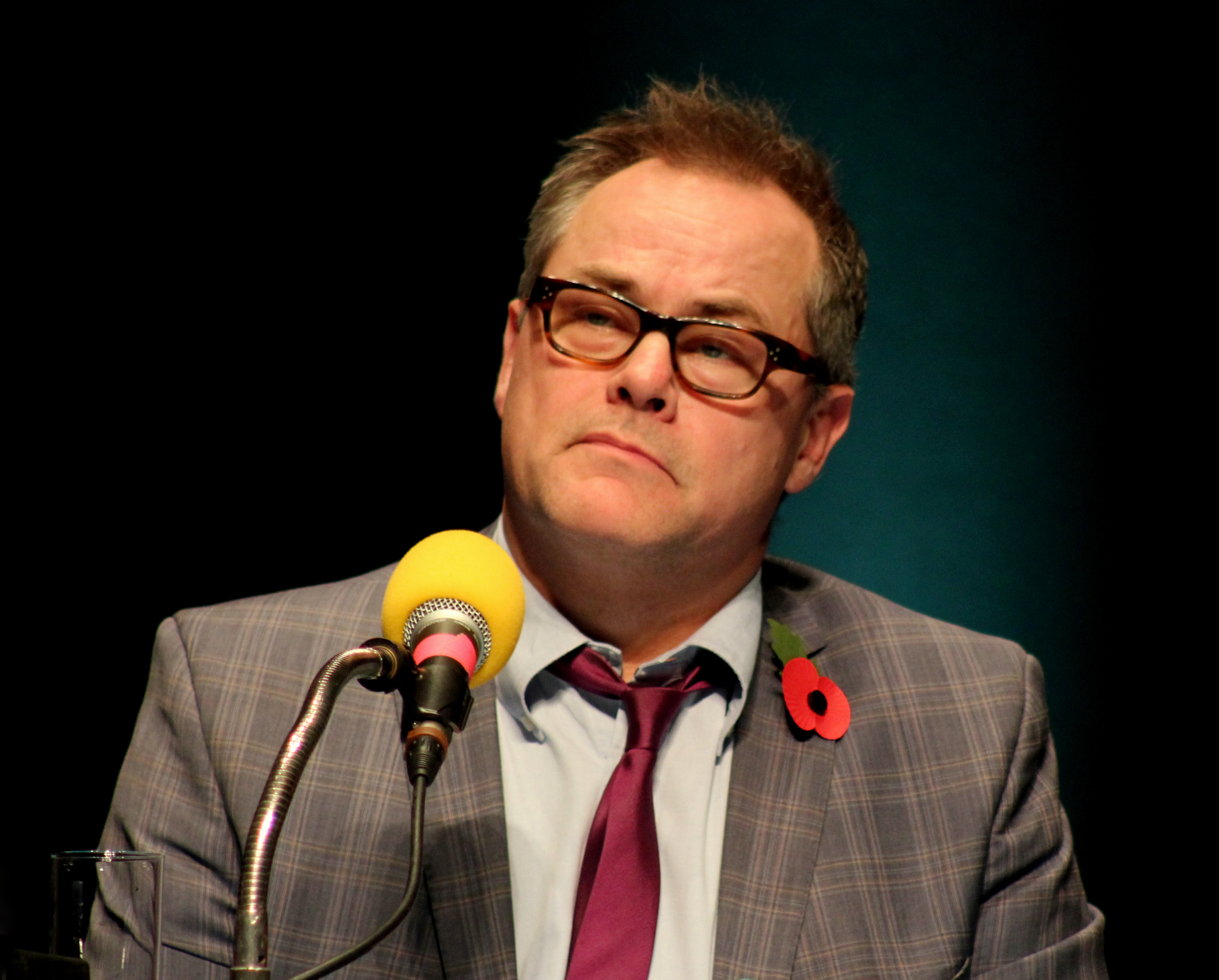
Jack Dee, winner of series 1 (2001)

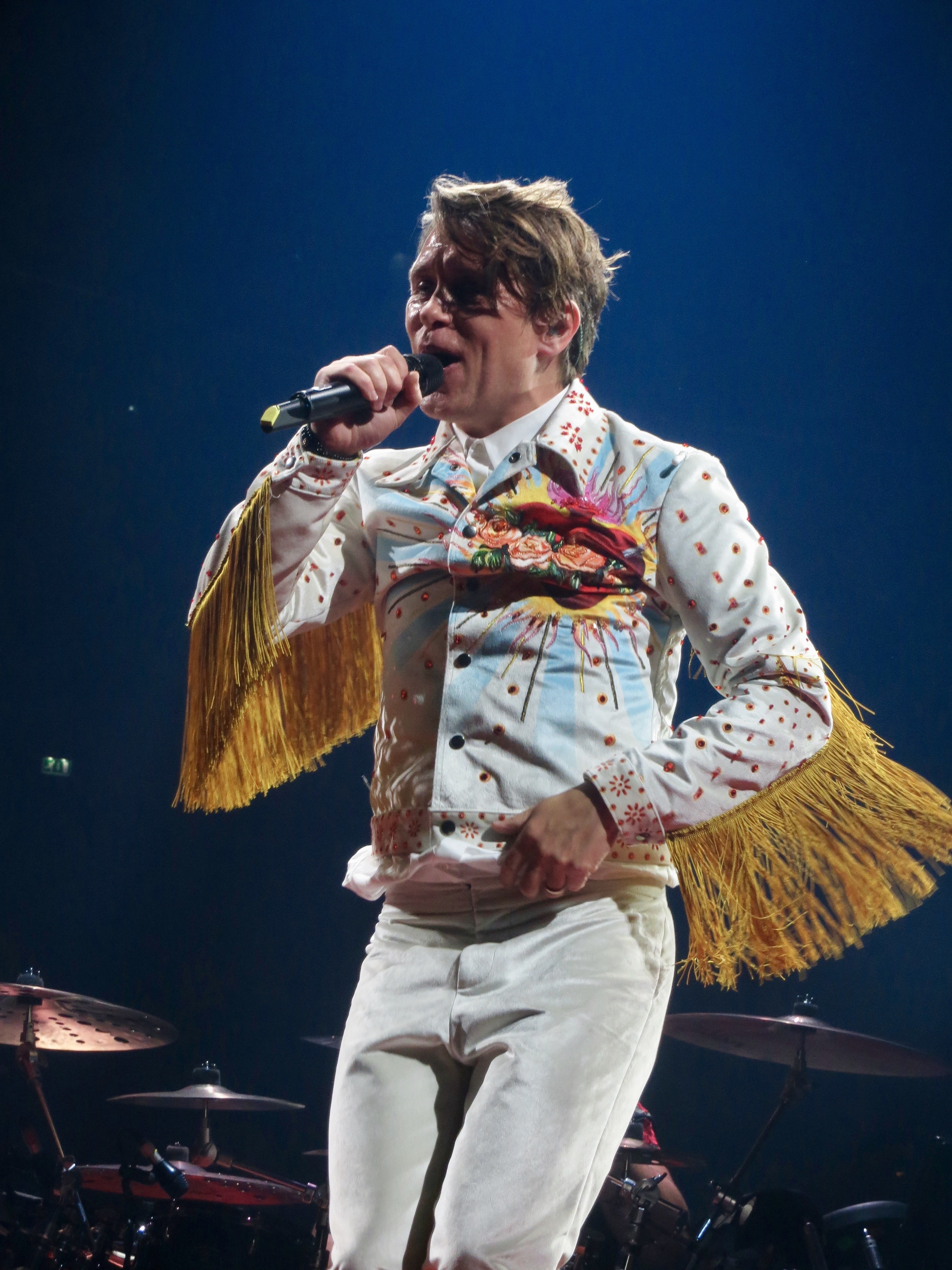
Mark Owen, winner of series 2 (2002)

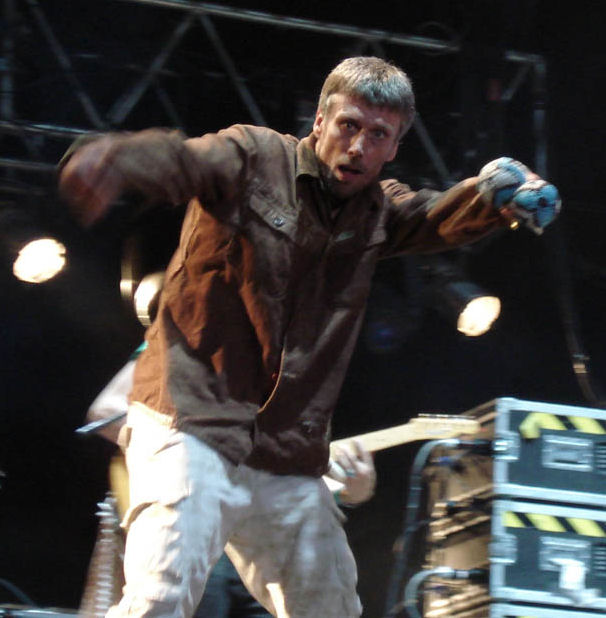
Bez, winner of series 3 (2005)

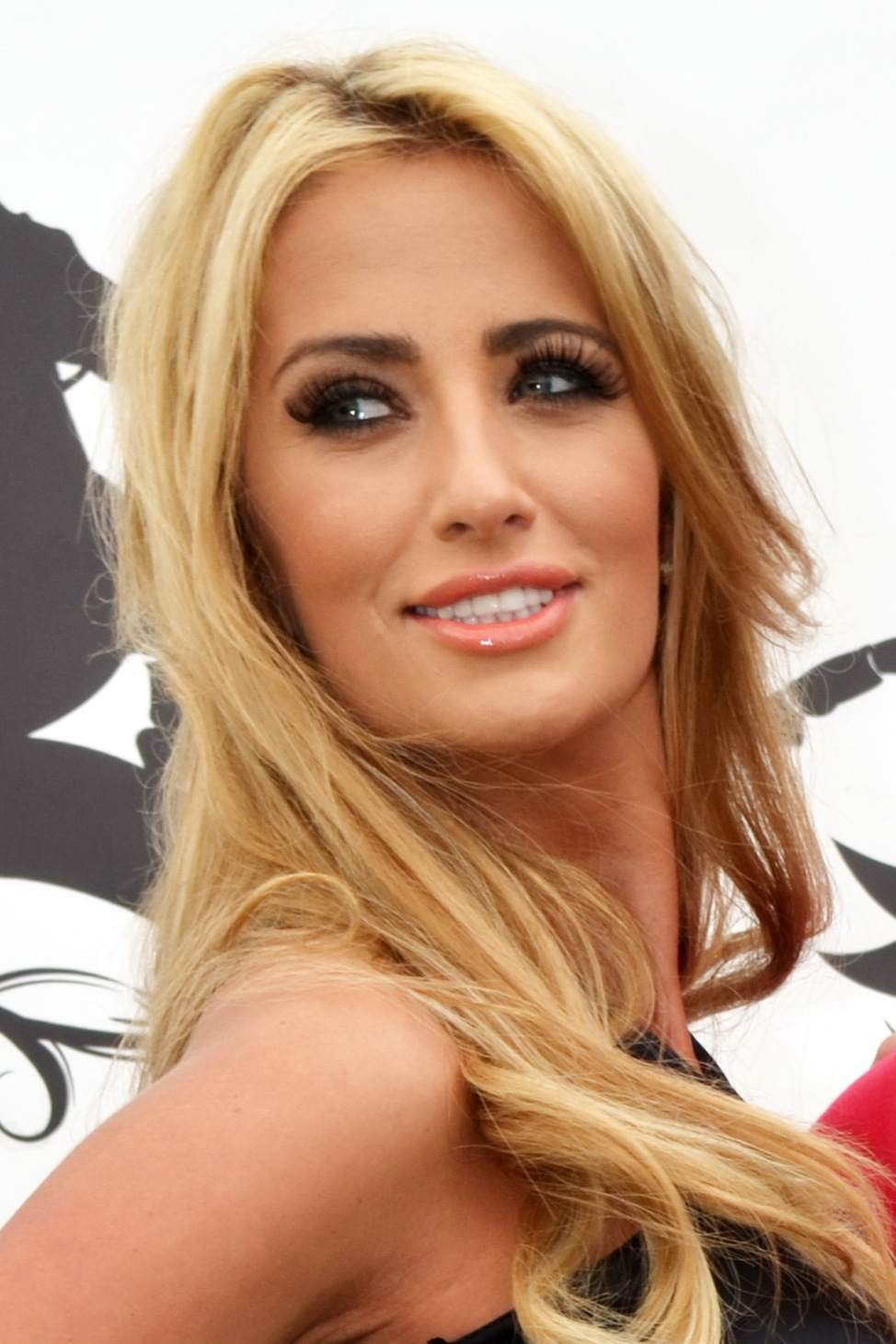
Chantelle Houghton, winner of series 4 (2006)

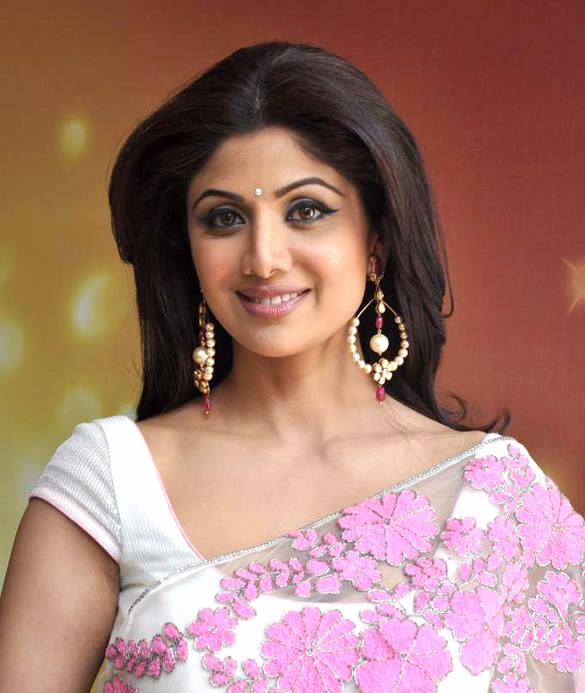
Shilpa Shetty, winner of series 5 (2007)

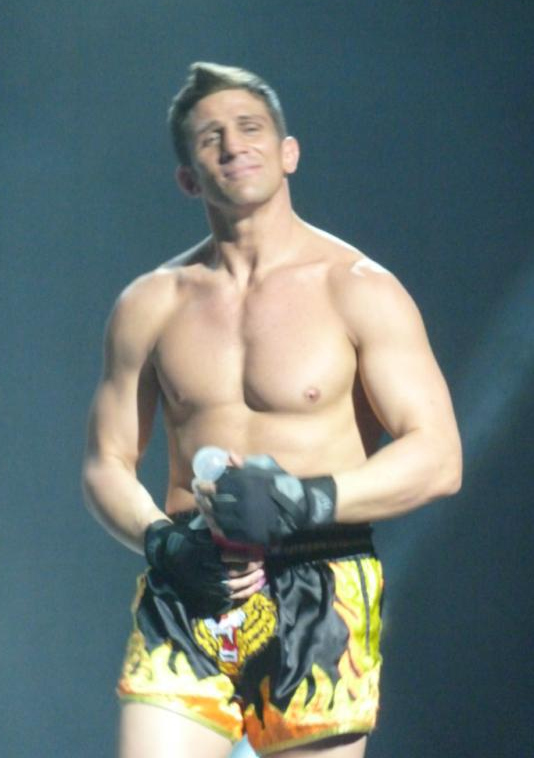
Alex Reid, winner of series 7 (2010)

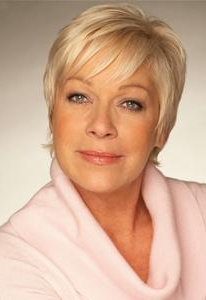
Denise Welch, winner of series 9 (January 2012)

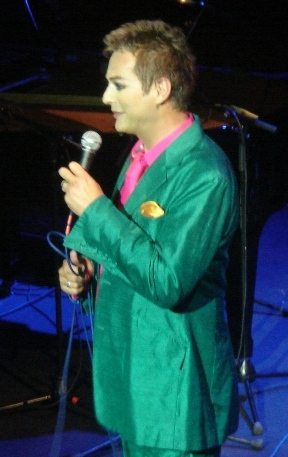
Julian Clary, winner of series 10 (August-September 2012)

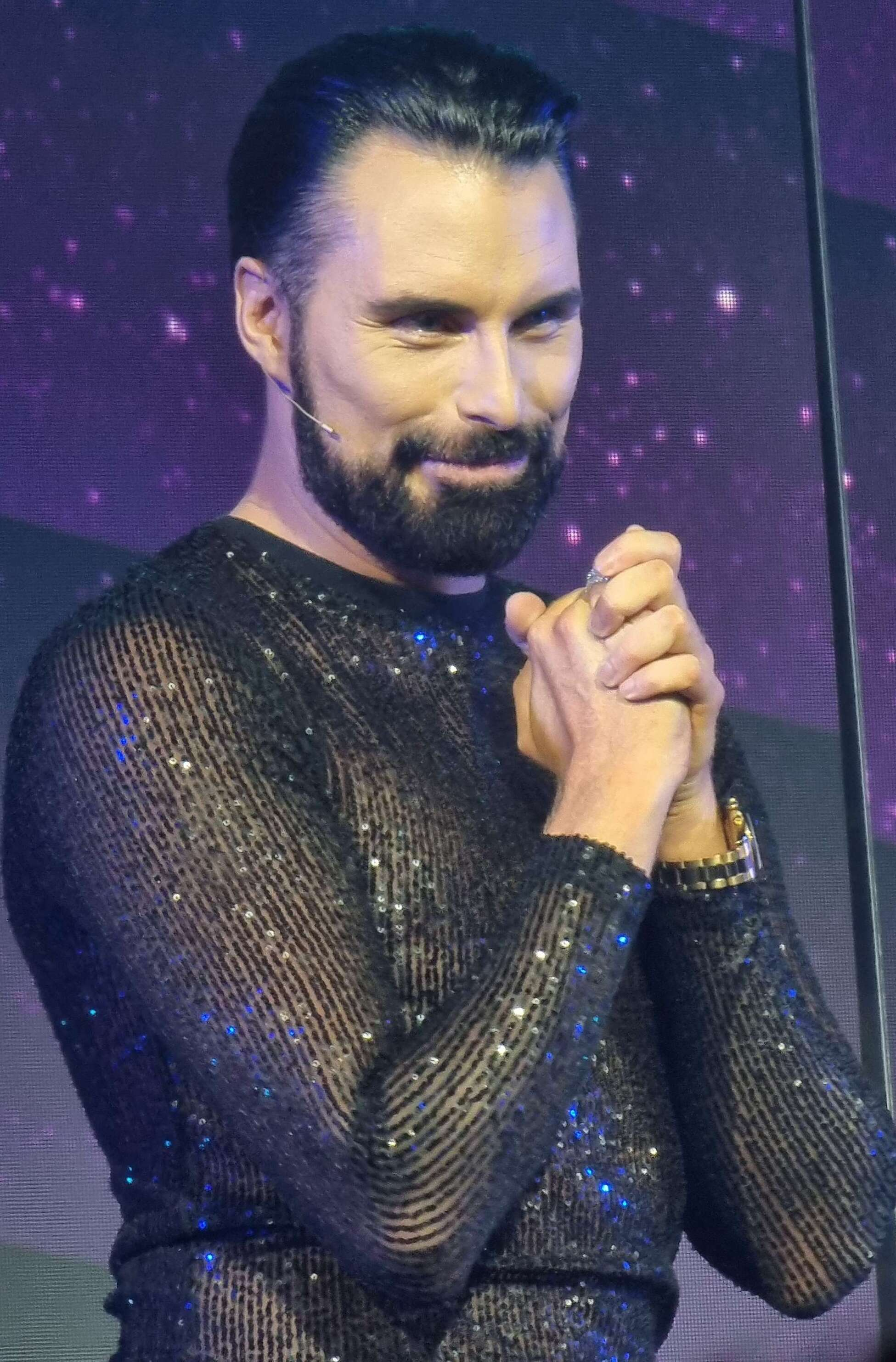
Rylan Clark, winner of series 11 (January 2013)

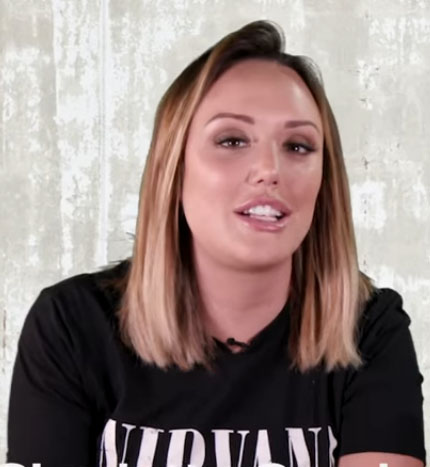
Charlotte Crosby, winner of series 12 (August-September 2013)

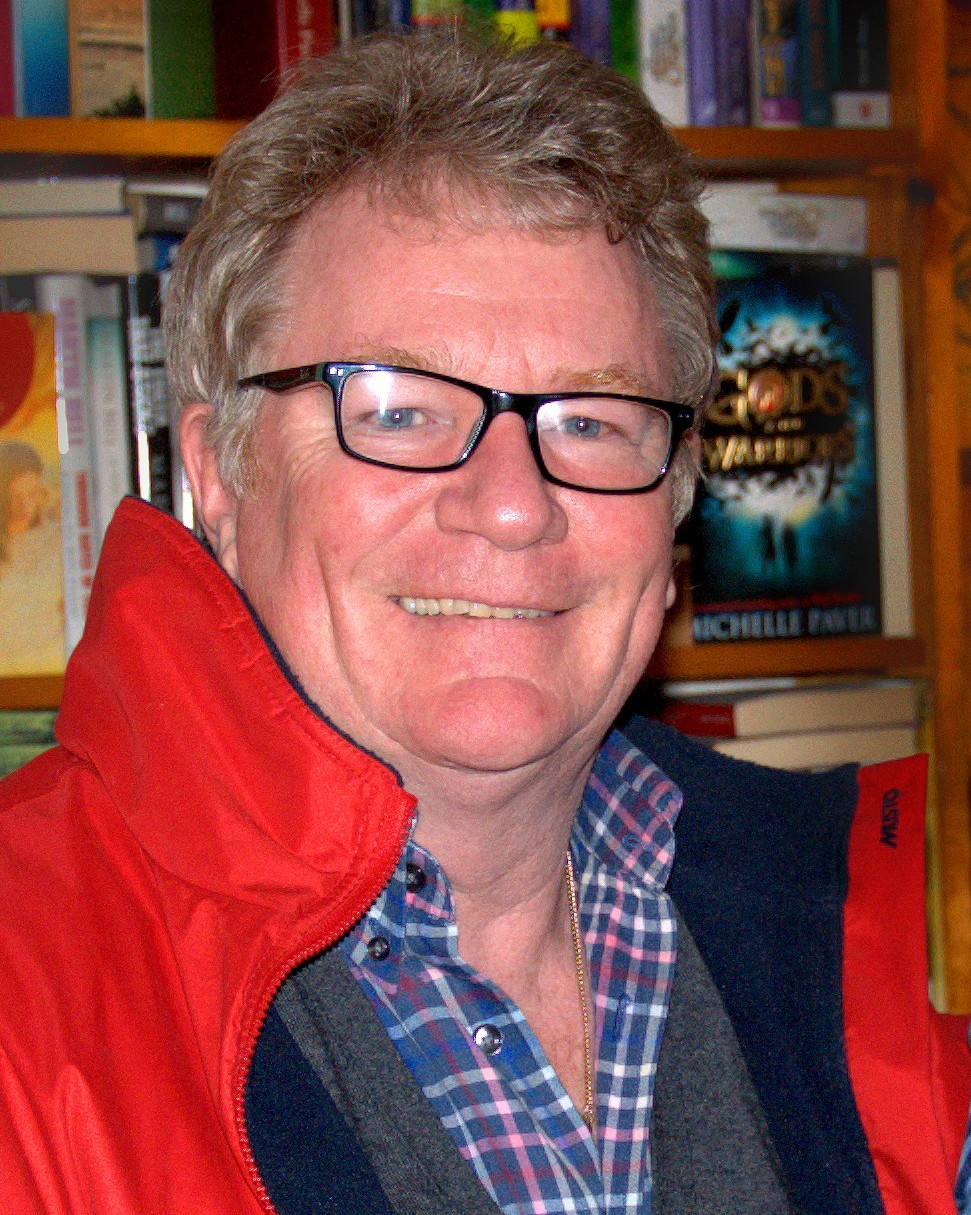
Jim Davidson, winner of series 13 (January 2014)

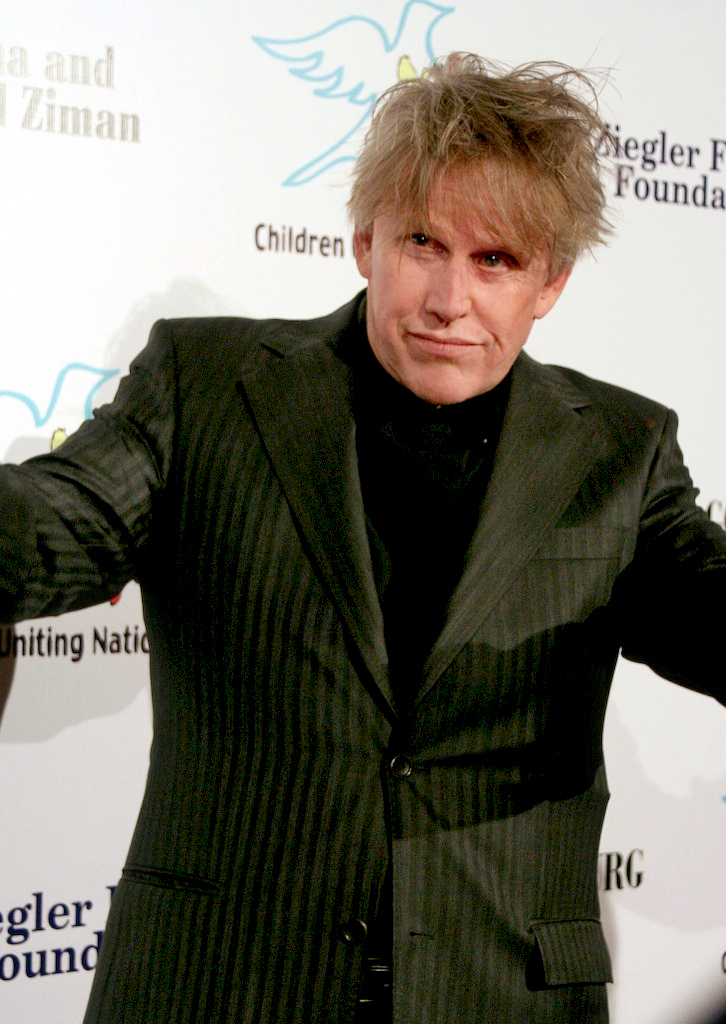
Gary Busey, winner of series 14 (August-September 2014)

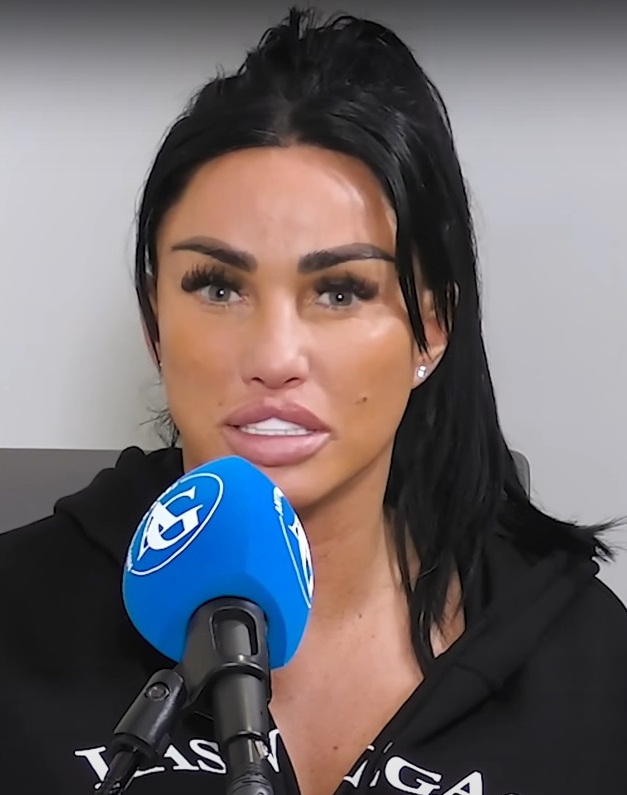
Katie Price, winner of series 15 (January-February 2015)

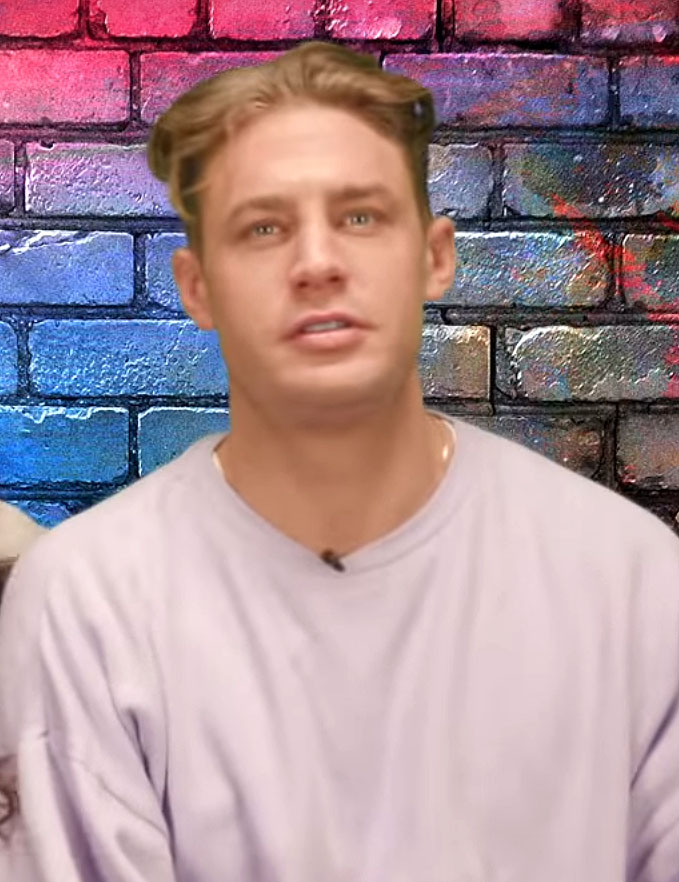
Scotty T, winner of series 17 (January-February 2016)

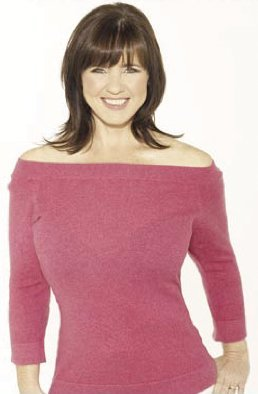
Coleen Nolan, winner of series 19 (January-February 2017)

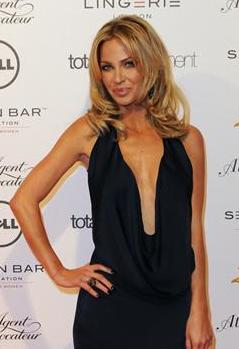
Sarah Harding †, winner of series 20 (August 2017)

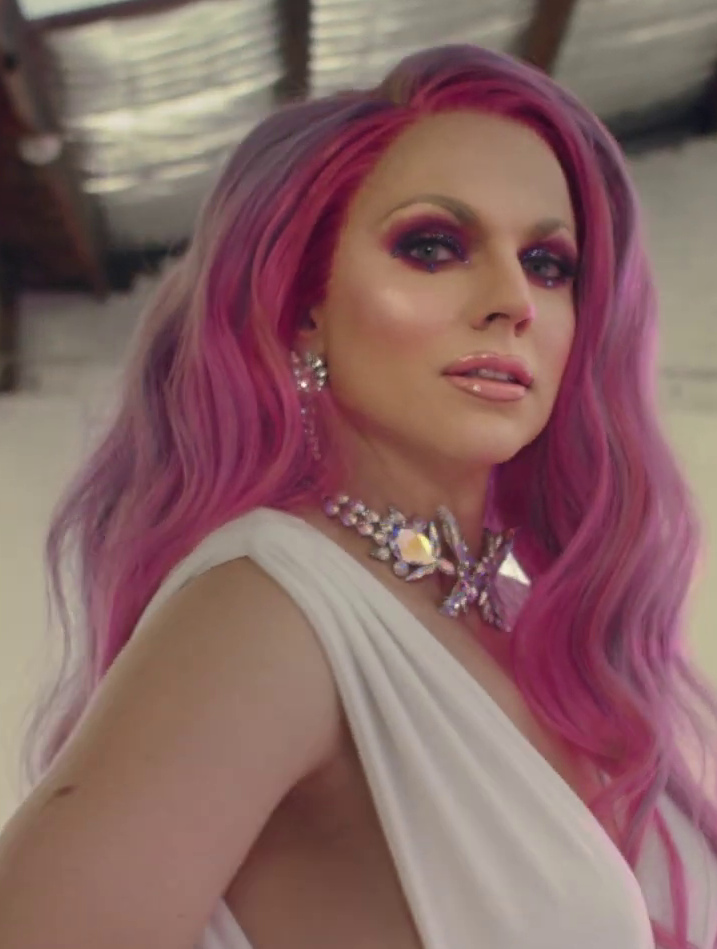
Courtney Act, winner of series 21 (January-February 2018)

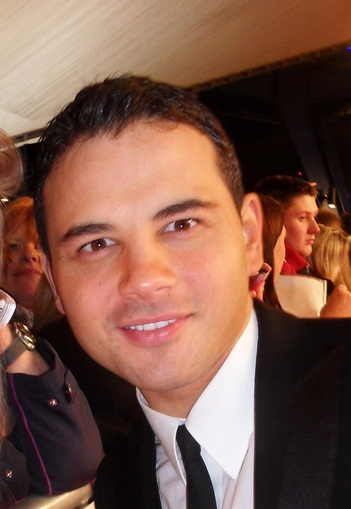
Ryan Thomas, winner of series 22 (August-September 2018)

== International versions ==
Name	Celebrity Big Brother UK history		Big Brother International history			
Name	Series	Status	Country	Series	Season(s)	Status
Brigitte Nielsen	Celebrity Big Brother 3	3rd place	Denmark	Big Brother	Big Brother V.I.P	Evicted – 8th place
Jade Goody	Celebrity Big Brother 5	Evicted – 9th place	India	Bigg Boss	Bigg Boss 2	Walked – 15th place
Frankie Grande	Celebrity Big Brother 18	Evicted - 6th place	United States	Big Brother	Big Brother 16	Evicted – 5th place
Brandi Glanville	Celebrity Big Brother 20	Evicted – 11th place	United States	Celebrity Big Brother	Celebrity Big Brother 1	Evicted – 7th place
