= Gossard =

Lingerie brand

- Formerly: H. W. Gossard Co.
- Industry: lingerie manufacturer
- Founded: 1901
- Founder: Henry Williamson Gossard
- Headquarters: Nottingham
- Key people: R. C. Stirton
- Products: women's undergarments lingerie
- Website: www.gossard.com

Gossard is a Nottingham-based brand and manufacturer of women's undergarments and hosiery. Founded in the early 20th century in Chicago as H. W. Gossard Co., it expanded quickly, flourishing in the 1920s. As Associated Apparel Industries, Inc. it held a central position in its market in the 1930s. Amalgamated eventually succumbed to the poor economy in the United States during the Great Depression, but Gossard continued as a division of Courtaulds in Great Britain until it was announced on the Gossard website that " Gossard has officially ceased trading and entered liquidation effective 14th May 2026. We would like to thank our customers, partners, and employees for their support over the years".

== History ==
Gossard was established as H. W. Gossard Co. in Chicago in 1901, per company history, after its founder Henry Williamson Gossard was inspired by a corset worn at a Paris performance by the actress Sarah Bernhardt. In this performance of the play L'Aiglon, she played the role of a boy, and wore a made to measure corset. H. W. Gossard decided to import the concept to America and market it. In the 1920s it introduced the idea of putting corset ties on the front, allowing the wearer to untie them herself. The company advertised extensively under the slogan "The Gossard Line of Beauty." In 1928 the company was reorganized as a division of Associated Apparel Industries, Inc. The manufacturer became a conglomerate after acquiring Venus Company and Lamode Garment Company, adding $3,000,000 in annual revenue. Associated Apparel, Inc., planned to build a plant in Germany, and its president, R. C. Stirton, sailed for Europe in May 1929 to facilitate this.

Stockholders of Nature's Rival Company, a firm previously acquired by Associated Apparel, Inc., brought a bankruptcy petition against Amalgamated in September 1933. The suit was filed in the United States District Court in Chicago. It asked for a sum of $1,232,500.

After the bankruptcy, the company reformed as H. W. Gossard but became a British company. It continued to manufacture women's underwear and hosiery, and R. C. Stirton continued as its president until his death in 1945. During the Second World War, Gossard produced parachutes, sails, and bras for women of the English navy.

Gossard was acquired by Courtaulds Textile Group in 1959. At some point it became a property of the French DBApparel, but was reacquired by Courtaulds in 2007.

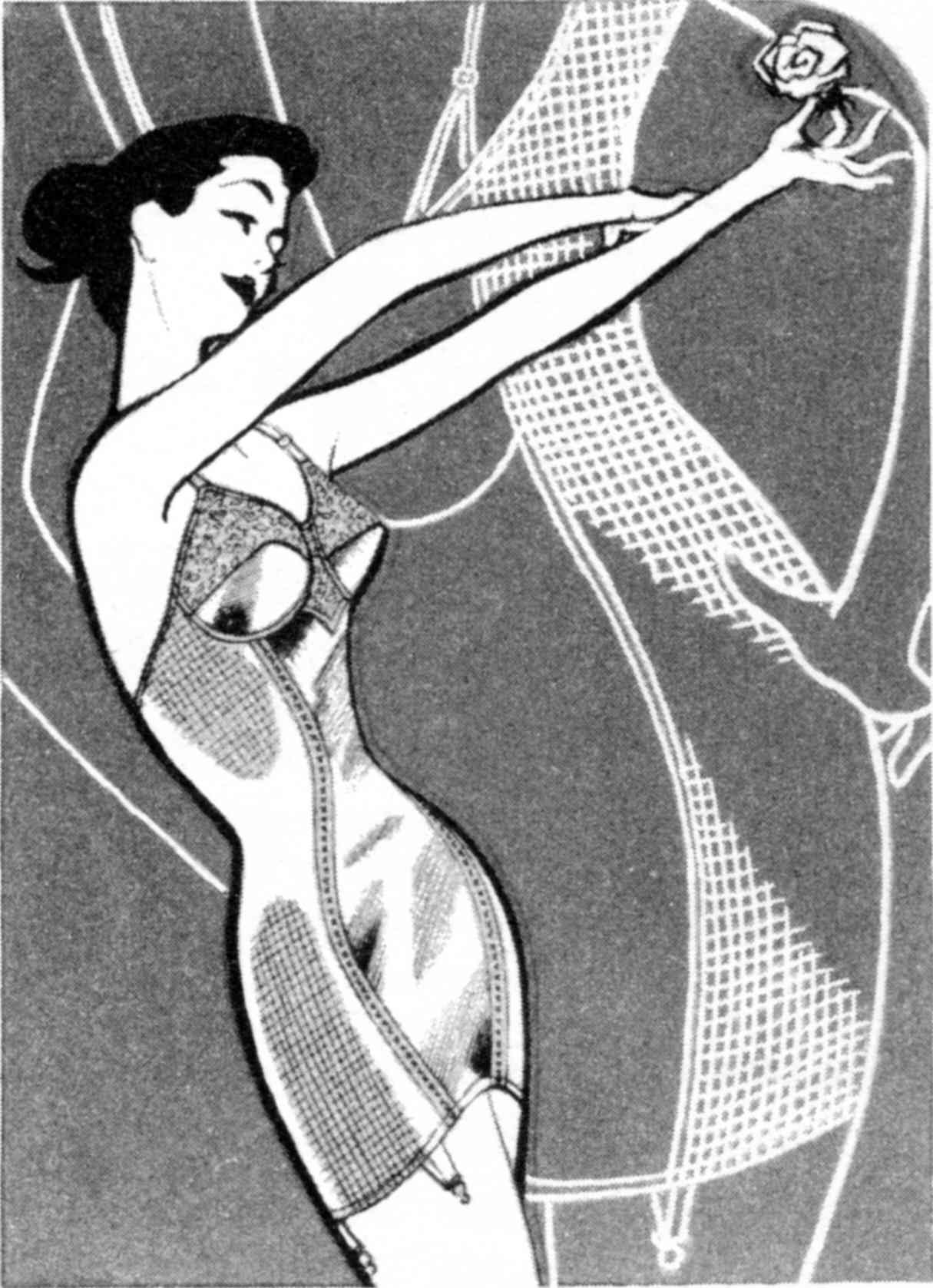
Gossard Corselette Advertisement in 1953

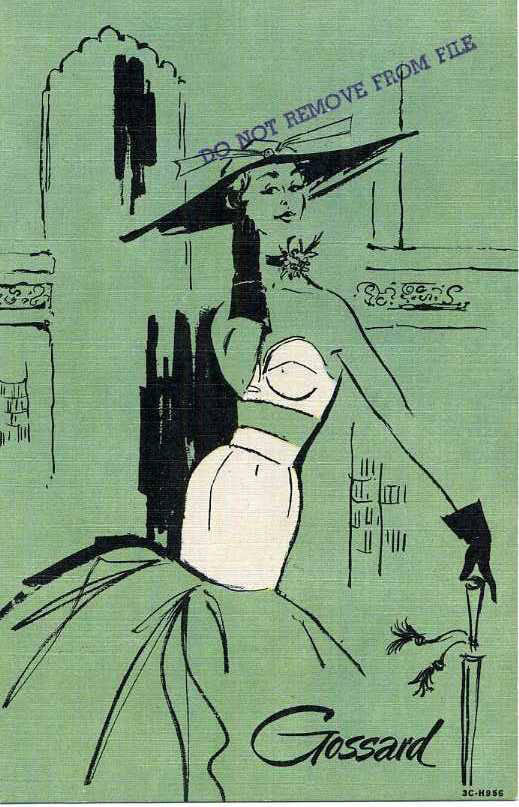
Gossard Advertisement 1953

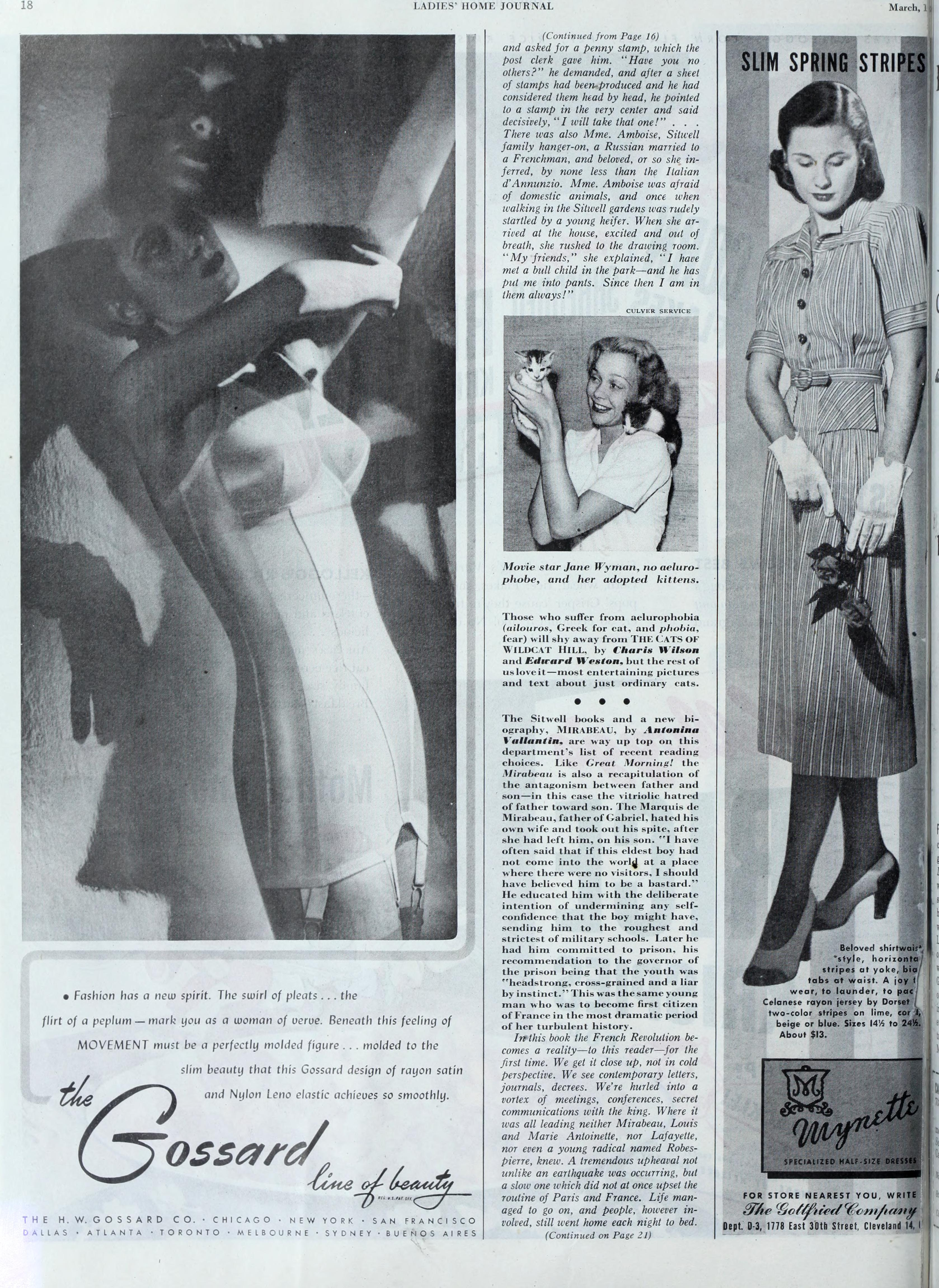
Gossard Line of Beauty 1948 Advertisement

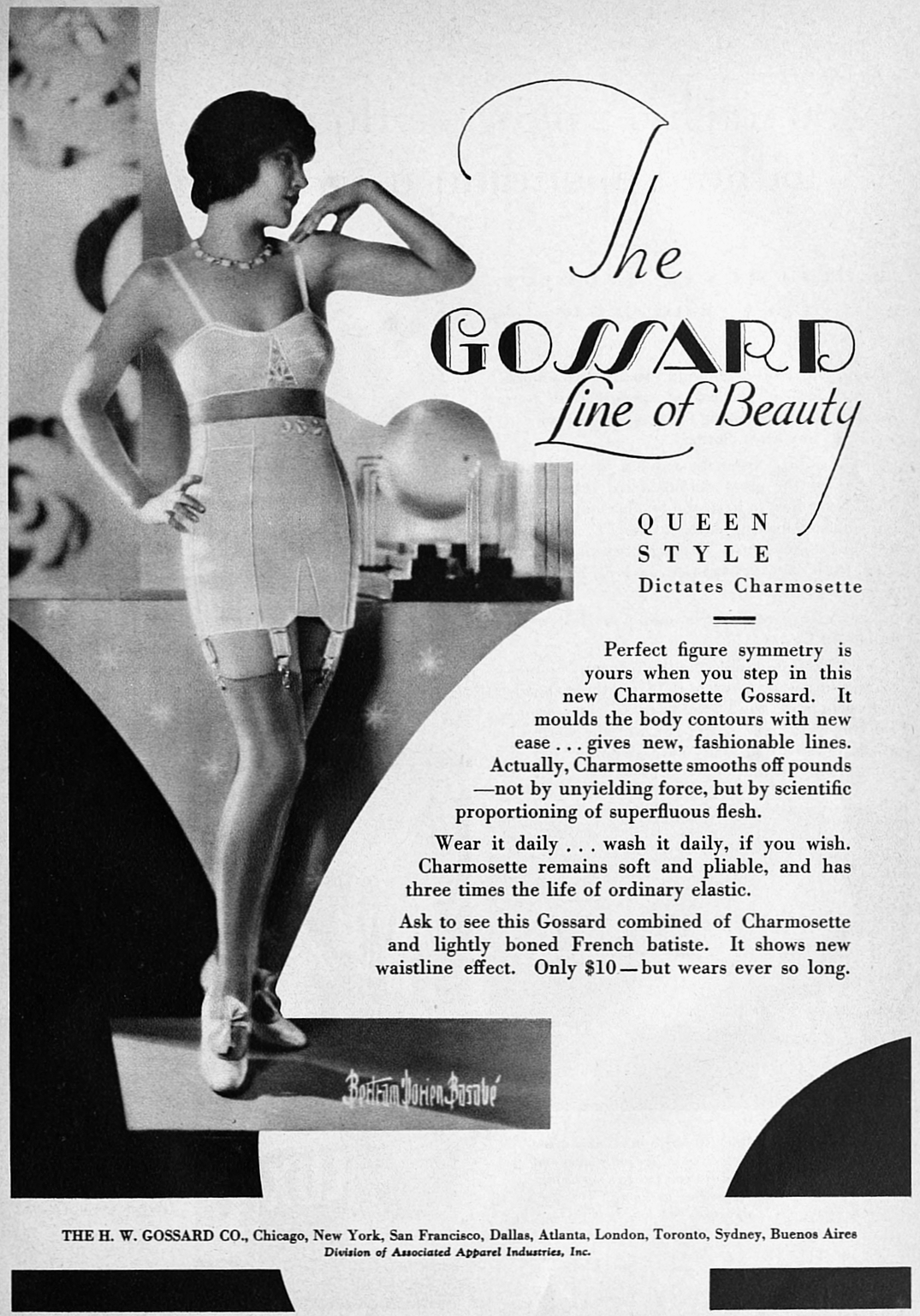
Gossard Line of Beauty 1929 Advertisement

Gossard's Gypsy corset 1995

The book Gossard Girls was written by Phyllis Michael Wong about Gossard factory life in the Upper Peninsula of Michigan in 1920–1970s. The Gossard plant in Ishpeming, Michigan continued to operate until 1976.

In the 1960s Gossard produced a wide range of bras and corsets and pioneered the panty-girdle. In the 1970s Gossard introduced Glossies, a brand designed for a transparent and iridescent appearance. Gossard developed larger sizes of Glossies in DD. In the 1980s, Gossard introduced the Ritz collection with matched colours.

== Advertising campaigns ==
In 1994 the Hello Boys advertising campaign for Gossards Wonderbra featuring model Eva Herzigová was voted "the greatest poster of all time" in 2011.

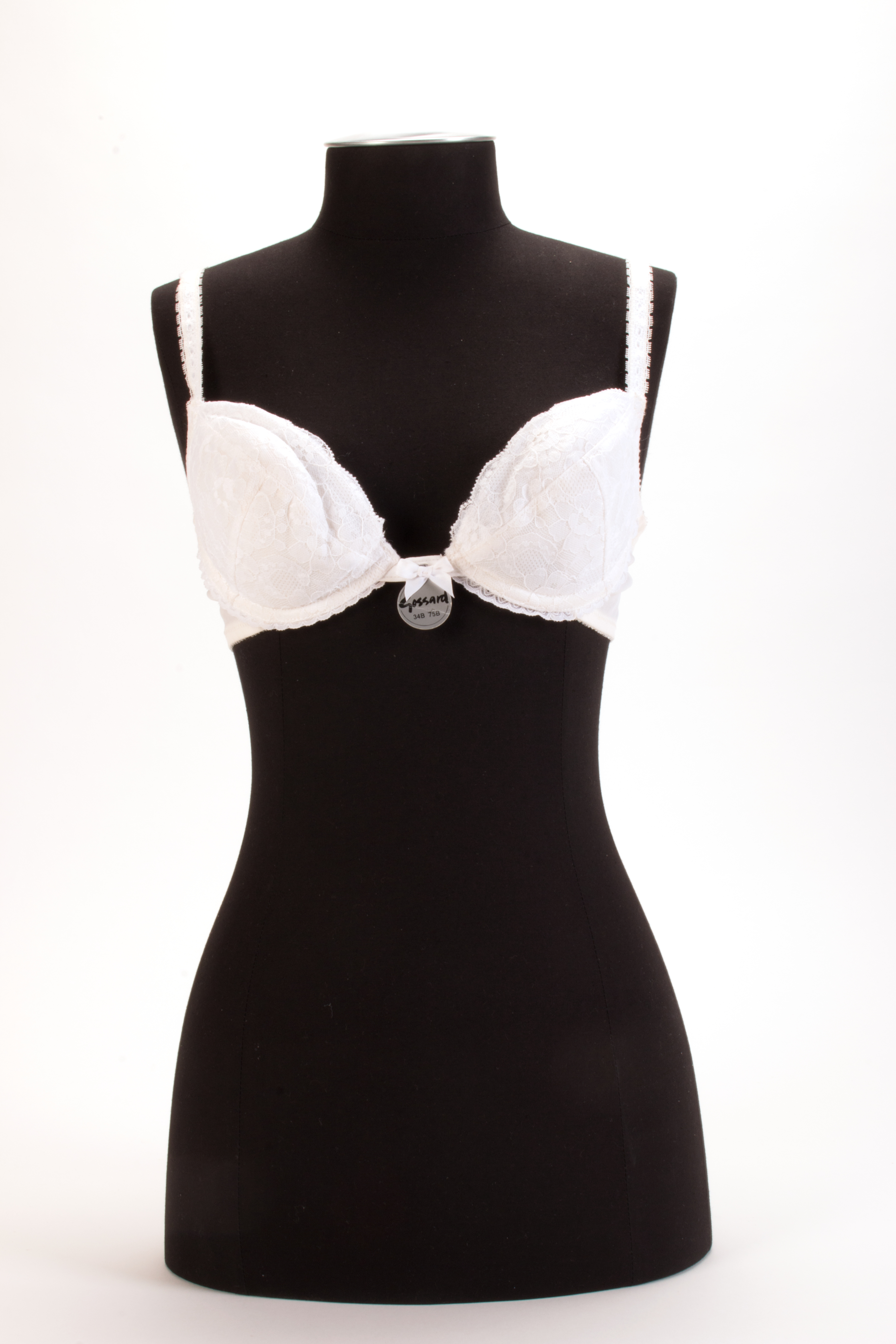
Gossard Wonderbra

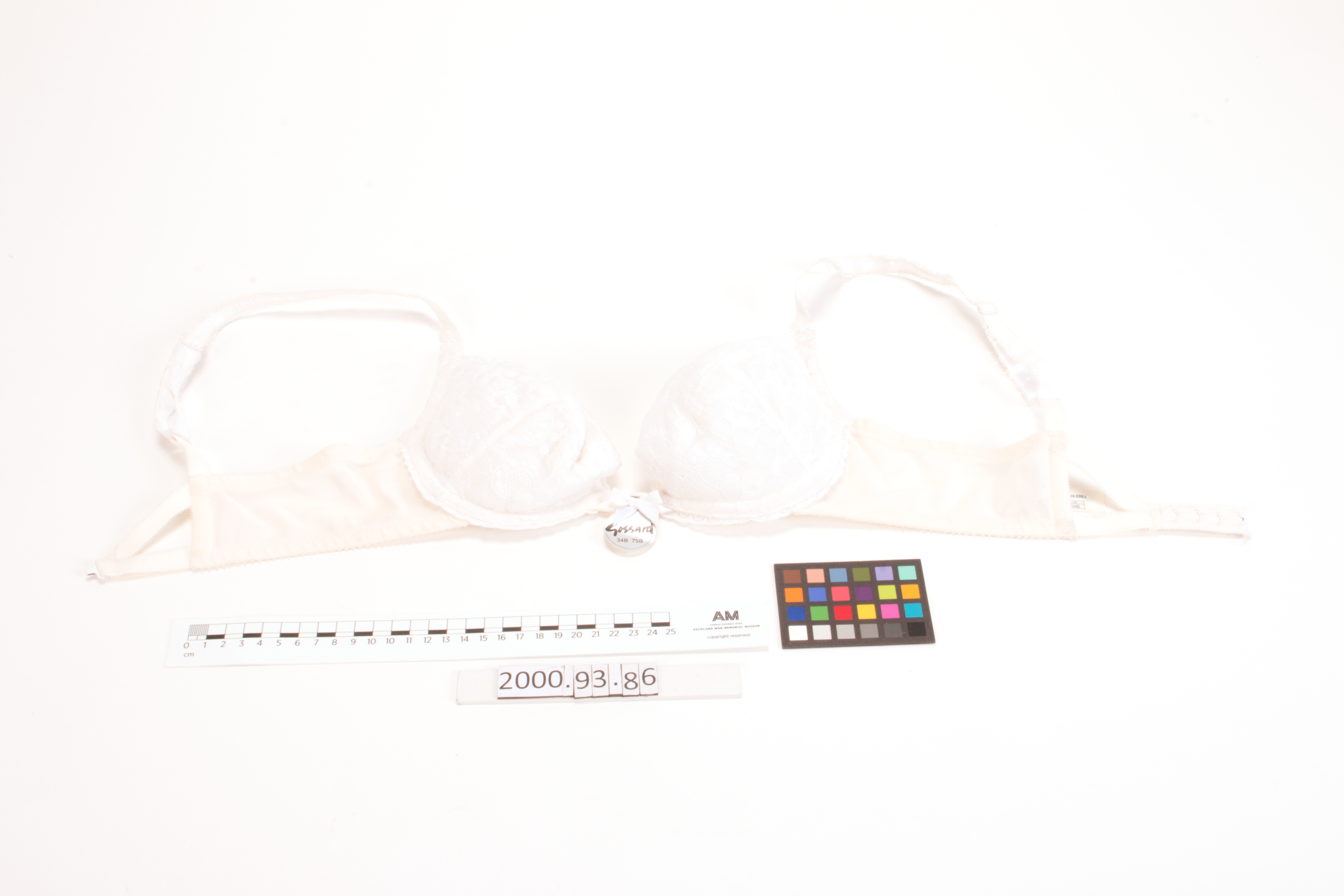
Gossard Wonderbra II

In 1996 Sophie Anderton appeared in the Gossard Glossies "Girl in the grass" national advertising campaign shot by Herb Ritts, which included the tag line "Who said a woman couldn't get pleasure from something soft?" The campaign attracted a record number of complaints (321) to the Advertising Standards Authority, none of which were upheld.

In 2002 Gossard introduced their G-String models, which immediately sold out. The G-Strings with diamantes and the "G" logo became popular in the 2000s. Emma Willis was announced as the face of Gossard.

Following an appearance on Celebrity Big Brother 2013, Gossard girl Sophie Anderton recreated her "bed of hay" Glossies campaign 17 years after the original. "I'm now a woman not a young girl. So I feel I embrace my body more and I am definitely more confident than I was at 19. I couldn't believe when Gossard booked me the first time, it was very surreal. But this time it was like returning home," Anderton said.

In December 2014, Olympia Valance became the new face and body of Gossard. Of her role, she said "The last year has been a whirlwind and to work with such an established name as Gossard is a dream come true. I absolutely love working on Neighbours and the fact that I am able to come over to England and do an incredible campaign like this is a credit to the show's following, both here and down under." Valance has appeared in photo shoots for the brand's swimwear and lingerie collections, including their 2015 spring/summer campaign.

In 2022 Gossard released the "I am Enough" campaign, celebrating body positivity. Gossard developed the size range further to G.
