= Celebrity Big Brother 2013 =

Celebrity Big Brother 2013 may refer to one of two series of Celebrity Big Brother UK which aired in 2013:

- Celebrity Big Brother (British TV series) series 11, January series
- Celebrity Big Brother (British TV series) series 12, August–September series
