= Dublin Wives =

Irish television series (2012–2013)

- The first season's logo.
- Country of origin: Ireland
- Original language: English
- No. of series: 2
- No. of episodes: 8

Original release
- Network: TV3
- Release: 28 May 2012 – 10 January 2013

Dublin Wives (previously Dublin Housewives) was an Irish reality television programme broadcast on TV3. The series followed the lives of five housewives living in the city: Danielle Meagher, Jo Jordan, Lisa Murphy, Roz Flanagan, and Virginia Macari. It introduced viewers to their lifestyles, families, and homes.

The first series followed a format similar to the US franchise The Real Housewives, though it has no connection to that franchise, and was required to make changes amid concerns from NBC. According to the series premise, the women are portrayed as "living the dream with handsome husbands, beautiful children, stylish homes, and a fabulous wardrobe."

== The Wives ==
=== Danielle Meagher ===
Danielle Meagher (born 1980), also known as "Danielle Marr", is an Irish television personality, best known for appearing in Dublin Wives and the twelfth series of Celebrity Big Brother. She runs a Botox clinic in Dublin.

=== Jo Jordan ===
Jo Jordan is an entrepreneur. Jordan lives in Castleknock, although she spent her childhood living on the streets, and later in Ballymun. Jordan has two sons, Gavin and Josh, having first given birth at the age of 16. She met her husband, James, 10 years prior to broadcast and together they have built a successful business. Jordan planned to start a makeup line with fellow Dublin Wife, Lisa Murphy.

=== Lisa Murphy ===
Lisa Murphy is the former fiancé of dancer Michael Flatley, owns a beauty salon "A New Lisa Life," and has also appeared in magazines. Murphy describes herself as being "a bit of a square" and surprisingly shy. After an interview on Ireland AM, Gerald Kean announced that he and Lisa were planning to get married. That relationship has since ended.

=== Roz Flanagan ===
Roz Flanagan is from County Monaghan. Flanagan and her husband Vincent manage a family food business and have four daughters. Flanagan met her husband at the age of sixteen and married him when she was twenty. Flanagan donates much of her free time to supporting The Cari Foundation.

=== Virginia Macari ===
Virginia Macari is a fashion designer, actress, and model. Macari is a member of the "Macari Fish and Chip dynasty." She was born in Italy but raised in Cork.
Macari has a son named Thor. She is attempting to launch her own bikini line.

== Name change ==
In late 2012, NBC took notice of Dublin Housewives (which is not part of the Real Housewives franchise) and found similarities between it and their franchise. After viewing an episode of the show, NBC requested changes be made.

It was agreed between NBC and TV3 that the 'Housewives' title of the series would be replaced by 'Wives' and that Dublin's Spire be removed from the programme's logo, which appeared similar to promotional material for The Real Housewives of New York City which features the iconic Empire State Building.

According to a report in the Irish Independent, the change came after direct contact from NBC, which owns The Real Housewives franchise, recently valued by The Hollywood Reporter as being worth upwards of half a billion dollars.

A TV3 source stressed that all contact with NBC had been amicable, and that NBC was impressed by Dublin Wives.

== Cancellation ==
Jeff Ford replaced Ben Frow as the director of content at TV3, and he said major shows would be axed, as he brings in fresh content to lead the channel upmarket, more highbrow and away from the "trashy" reality shows favored by his predecessor. By mid-2013, the stars and production company of Dublin Wives have not been contacted by TV3 about a new series, "No one has heard one way or the other about its re-commissioning. It's the silence on the matter that would prompt me to believe that it won't be coming back," said a source.

It has been revealed that shows like Tallafornia and Dublin Wives will be axed as Ford believes these are "too trashy" - with industry insiders saying UTV may consider bidding for the company. A source said: "Jeff did hint that he might move them to 3e but it looks like he’s not keen to make them again as he doesn’t feel the money involved in making them justifies the figures.

== Spin-offs ==
Jo Jordan and Lisa Murphy have been filming their own fly-on-the-wall documentary series, they are calling: Jo And Lisa ... Keeping Up Appearances. The pair are in talks with RTÉ and TV3 about getting it commissioned. "It's not like Dublin Wives showing us in fancy hotels, but it is very much fly-on-the-wall, where you can see us on our good days, our bad days, without make-up and taking in our washing – stuff like that".

Danielle Meagher has also been filming her own spin-off show of Dublin Wives, 'Dr Danielle's Diaries'.
