= Sophie Anderton =

English model and reality TV personality

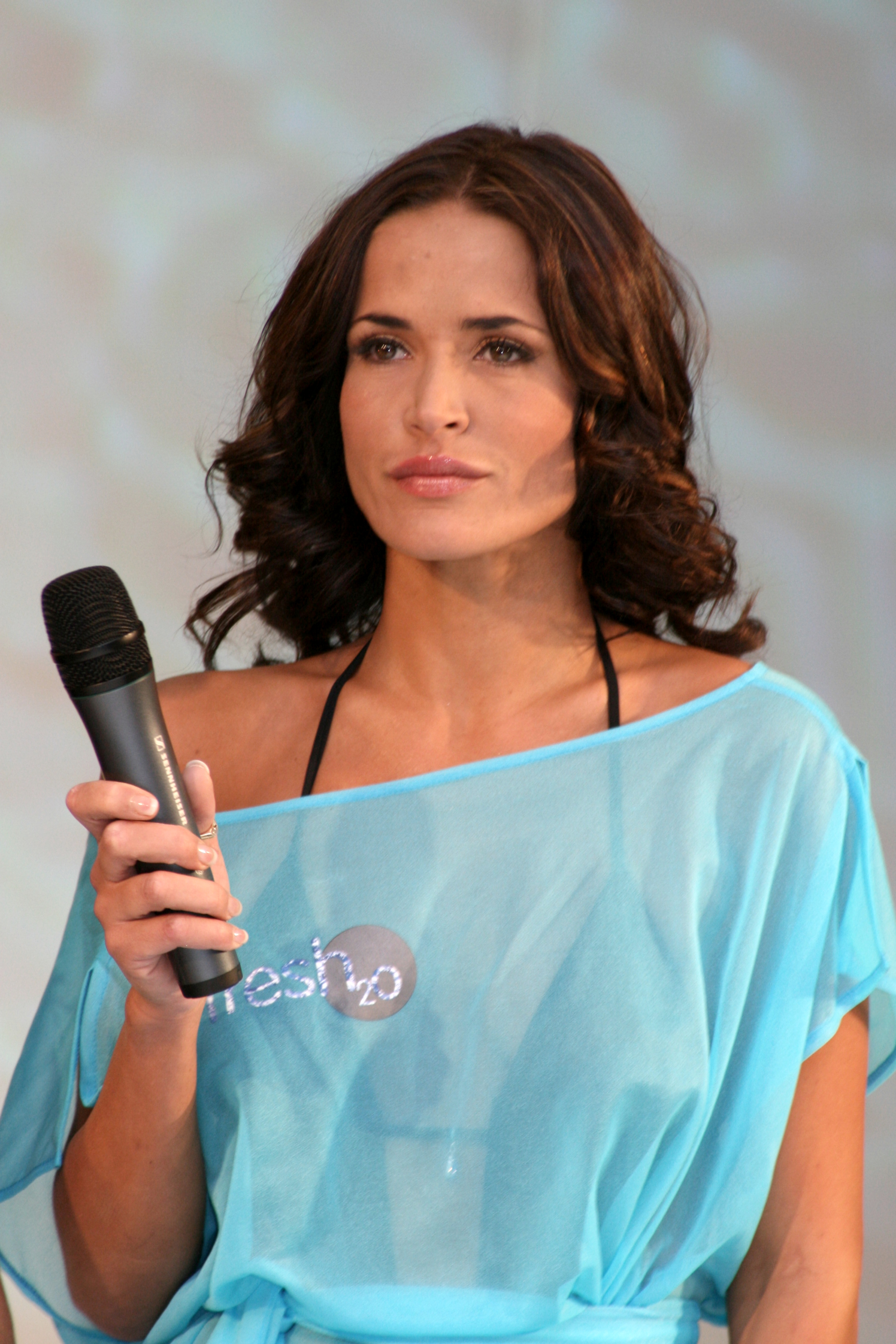
- Anderton in 2007, at the Intimate Body and Beach fashion show in London.
- Born: Sophie Louise Anderton; 14 May 1977 (age 49); Bristol, England
- Occupations: Model; reality television personality
- Years active: 1996–present
- Spouse: Kazimierz Balinski-Jundzill (m. 2021)
- Relatives: Ella Balinska (stepdaughter)
- Modelling information
- Height: 5 ft 9 in (1.75 m)
- Hair colour: Brown
- Eye colour: Green
- Website: sophieanderton.com

Sophie Louise Anderton (born 14 May 1977) is an English model and reality television personality.

Her modelling career included a campaign for Gossard bras in 1996, and later included appearances for a range of other brands. Since 2000, she has also appeared in television programmes including I'm a Celebrity...Get Me Out of Here! and Celebrity Big Brother.

== Career ==
Anderton was born in Bristol, England. In 1996, she appeared in the Gossard Glossies and Gossard Wonderbra "Girl in the grass" national advertising campaign shot by Herb Ritts, which included the strapline "Who said a woman couldn't get pleasure from something soft?" The campaign attracted a record number of complaints (321) to the Advertising Standards Authority, none of which were upheld.

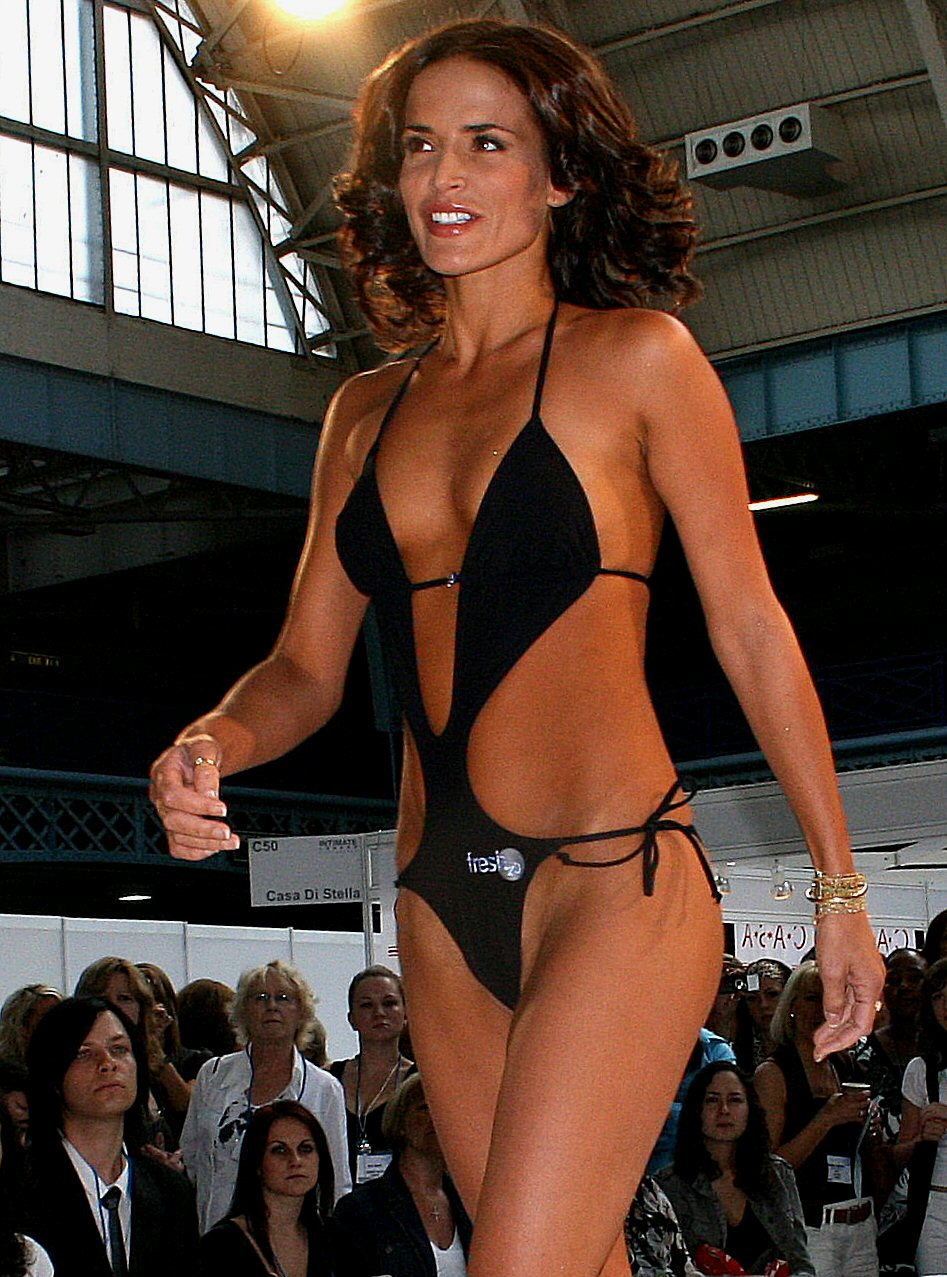
Anderton on the fashion runway for the Intimate Body and Beach fashion show in 2007.

Anderton has modeled for Gossard (1998), the Flora London Marathon, British Berries summer fruits (2006), Maxim, Peacocks and La Senza and graced the cover of British GQ.

In 2004, Anderton was a contestant on the fourth series of ITV's I'm a Celebrity...Get Me Out of Here!. She appeared in the TV series Simply the Best and a celebrity edition of the UK version of Fear Factor. In 2005, she appeared on the programme Cold Turkey, which documented her attempts to quit smoking cigarettes; she later became a representative for a smoking cessation program called QS7D (Quit Smoking in 7 Days).

In 2006, Anderton was a contestant on ITV's Love Island. In the same year, she appeared on Sky1's Cirque de Celebrité but withdrew after sustaining ligament damage.

In August 2013, Anderton became a housemate on the twelfth series of Celebrity Big Brother. She was eliminated from competition in an episode that aired on 3 September 2013.

== Personal life ==
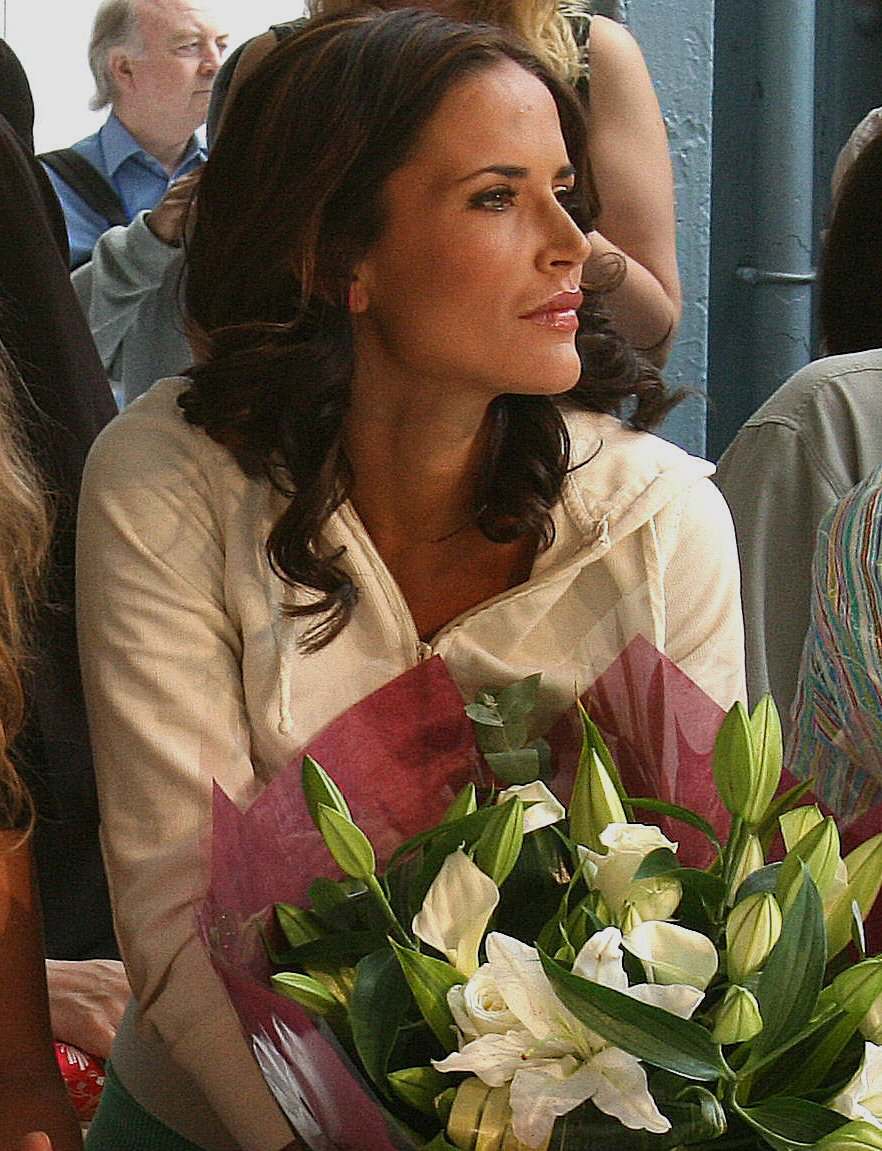
Anderton in 2007, after runway performance at the Intimate Body and Beach fashion show.

In 2004, Anderton spoke of a six-year period of drug addiction. From 2004 until 2007, she was a patron of Action on Addiction in London, a charity and addiction research centre investigating drug and alcohol dependence.

She was misdiagnosed and treated for bipolar disorder in 2006. She said, "I had depression. They wrongly diagnosed me and put me on a bucket load of blood pills. It was absolutely bonkers."

In 2009, Anderton complained to the police about dozens of text messages sent to her mobile phone. A man was eventually charged with harassment and convicted.

In 2013, just before she participated in Celebrity Big Brother 12, Anderton acknowledged past difficulties with substance abuse.

In 2021, Anderton married Kazimierz Balinski-Jundzill, the father of Ella Balinska.

== Film and television ==
=== Film ===
- Popcorn (2007) as "Female Killer"

=== Television appearances ===
- The Late Late Show (2004)
- Hell's Kitchen (2004)
- Celebrity Fear Factor UK (2004)
- Simply the Best (2004)
- I'm a Celebrity... Get Me Out of Here! (2004)
- GMTV (2004)
- Big Brother's Efourum (2004, 2005)
- This Morning (2004, 2006)
- Taste (2005)
- 1 Leicester Square (2006)
- Celebrity Love Island (2006)
- Friday Night with Jonathan Ross (2006)
- Tubridy Tonight (2006)
- Loose Women (2007)
- Alan Carr's Celebrity Ding Dong (2008)
- The Jeremy Kyle Show (2009)
- Total Wipeout (2012)
- Celebrity Big Brother 12 (2013)
