= Celebrity Big Brother (British TV series) series 12 =

Coordinates: 51°39′23″N 0°16′02″W

Celebrity Big Brother
- Series 12
- Series twelve logo
- Presented by: Emma Willis
- No. of days: 23
- No. of housemates: 13
- Winner: Charlotte Crosby
- Runner-up: Abz Love
- Companion shows: Big Brother's Bit on the Side
- No. of episodes: 26

Release
- Original network: Channel 5
- Original release: 22 August – 13 September 2013

Series chronology
- ← Previous; Series 11 Next → Series 13

Celebrity Big Brother 12 is the twelfth series of the British reality television series Celebrity Big Brother. It launched on 22 August 2013, three days after the fourteenth regular series final, in two parts. The series ended after 23 days on 13 September 2013, with Charlotte Crosby being voted the winner of the series by the public. It continued to air on Channel 5 as part of a two-year contract with Endemol, which secured the show until 2014. It was the fifth celebrity series to air on Channel 5 and the eighth series of Big Brother to air on the broadcaster overall since they acquired the show.

This was the first celebrity edition to be hosted by Emma Willis. Willis continued to host ...Bit on the Side, alongside Rylan Clark and AJ Odudu.

== Format ==
Celebrity Big Brother is a game show in which a group of celebrity contestants, referred to as housemates, live in isolation from the outside world in a custom built "house", constantly under video surveillance. During their time in the House, the housemates are required to nominate two of their fellow contestants for potential eviction, and the two or more with the most votes would be nominated. This process is mandatory for all housemates, and failure to comply could result in expulsion from the House. The public then vote, with one of those celebrities evicted from the house. When the final week arrives, the viewers vote for which of the remaining celebrities should win the series, and the housemate with the most votes becomes the winner.

During their time in the House, housemates are given weekly tasks to perform. The housemates wager a portion of their weekly shopping budget on the task, and either win double their wagered fund or lose the wagered fund depending on their performance in the task. The housemates are required to work as a group to complete their tasks, with the format of the tasks varying based on the number of remaining housemates. Throughout the series, some housemates have been given secret tasks that must either be completed individually or with a small group; failure to do so can result in the housemate being nominated or punished in the House. Should the housemates run out of the food provided for them, an emergency ration was available to them. The housemates are forbidden from discussing nominations, and doing so could result in punishment. The format of the series is mainly seen as a social experiment, and requires housemates to interact with others who may have differing ideals, beliefs, and prejudices. Housemates are also required to make visits to the Diary Room during their stay in the House, where they are able to share their thoughts and feelings on their fellow housemates and the game.

== Housemates ==
Celebrity	Age on entry	Notability	Day entered	Day exited	Status
Charlotte Crosby	23	Reality TV star	1	23	Winner
Abz Love	34	Singer and rapper	1	23	Runner-up
Lauren Harries	35	Media personality	1	23	3rd place
Carol McGiffin	53	TV presenter and journalist	1	23	4th place
Mario Falcone	25	Reality TV star	1	23	5th place
Vicky Entwistle	44	Actress	1	23	6th place
Louie Spence	44	Dancer and TV personality	1	21	Evicted
Courtney Stodden	18	TV and media personality	1	21	Evicted
Bruce Jones	60	Actor	1	16	Evicted
Dustin Diamond †	36	Actor	1	16	Evicted
Sophie Anderton	36	Model and reality TV star	1	14	Evicted
Ron Atkinson	74	Former football manager and pundit	1	9	Evicted
Danielle Marr	33	Reality TV star	1	7	Evicted

=== Abz Love ===
Richard Abidin Breen, better known as Abz Love or simply Abz, is an English singer, rapper, dancer, record producer and DJ. He has sold over 20 million records as a member and lead singer of boy band Five. He also released his debut studio album, Abstract Theory in 2003, which earned him a further three top ten hits. Abz entered the house on Day 1. Whilst in the house, he spoke in the Diary Room of his difficulty in social situations, and revealed that he has Asperger syndrome. On Day 23, Abz left in second place, losing to Charlotte Crosby.

=== Bruce Jones ===
Bruce Jones (born Ian Roy Jones) is an English actor who is known best for playing Les Battersby in Coronation Street. He entered the house on Day 1. Bruce was evicted on Day 16.

=== Carol McGiffin ===
Carol McGiffin is an English television and radio broadcaster, best known for her regular appearances on daytime talk show Loose Women. Her style then and characterized today is based on comedic observation on men. She entered the House on Day 1. On Day 23, Carol finished in fourth place. After appearing on the series, she was a regular panelist on the spin-off show Celebrity Big Brother... Bit on the Psych during the future thirteenth series.

=== Charlotte Crosby ===
Charlotte Crosby is an English reality television personality, who rose to fame as a cast member in the MTV reality series, Geordie Shore from series 1 onwards. She is also known for her on-again off-again relationship with co-star Gaz Beadle. She entered the House on Day 1. On Day 23, Crosby was crowned the winner of the series, beating Abz Love.

=== Courtney Stodden ===
Courtney Alexis Stodden, (born 29 August 1994), is an American tabloid personality. They made headlines with their marriage to Green Mile actor Doug Hutchison in 2011, when he was 51 and they were just 16. They entered the house on Day 1 and left on Day 21, two days before the final night.

=== Danielle Marr ===
Danielle Marr, also known as Danielle Meagher, (born 1979/80) is an Irish celebrity botox doctor and television personality, who rose to fame through being one of the main cast members on the former reality series Dublin Wives on TV3. She was described as being the 'alpha-female' amongst the other housewives in the show, with her strong wills, opinions and one-liners. Qualified as a graduate dentist, she became the clinical director for DermaFACE, a botox clinic based in Dublin. On Day 1, she entered the house. On Day 7, she was the first celebrity to be evicted, having received the fewest public votes to save.

=== Dustin Diamond ===
Dustin Neil Diamond, (born 7 January 1977, died 1 February 2021), was an American actor, musician, director, and stand-up comedian best known for his role as Samuel "Screech" Powers in the television show Saved by the Bell. He entered the house on Day 1 and was evicted on Day 16.

=== Lauren Harries ===
Lauren Harries is a British media personality and a purported "child prodigy" in the field of antiques who made appearances on television programmes including Wogan.

On Day 1, Lauren entered the House, and was selected out of the first three housemates to join the Temple. On Day 23, Lauren exited into third place.

=== Louie Spence ===
Louie Spence, (born 6 April 1969), is an English dance expert, choreographer and television personality best known as the artistic director at the Pineapple Dance Studios. He entered the house and then The Temple on Day 1. Louie was evicted on Day 21, following fellow housemate Courtney.

=== Mario Falcone ===
Mario Falcone is a British reality television personality, best known for starring in the ITV2 semi-reality programme The Only Way Is Essex from the third series onwards. Since then, he has become known for his on-again off-again relationship with cast member Lucy Mecklenburgh. He entered the House on Day 1. Mario was evicted in fifth place, and left the house with Vicky Entwistle.

=== Ron Atkinson ===
Ronald Frederick "Ron" Atkinson, (born 18 March 1939), is an English former football player and manager. He became manager to a series of successful football teams such as Sheffield Wednesday, Nottingham Forest, Aston Villa and Manchester United over the course of his career. Atkinson has become one of Britain's best-known football pundits, and his idiosyncratic turn of phrase has led to his utterances becoming known as "Big-Ronisms" or "Ronglish". He entered the house on Day 1 but was evicted on Day 9 after receiving the fewest votes to save from the public.

=== Sophie Anderton ===
Sophie Louise Anderton is an English model and reality television personality. She entered the house and then The Temple on Day 1. She was evicted on Day 14 having received the fewest votes to save.

=== Vicky Entwistle ===
Victoria "Vicky" Entwistle (born 15 September 1968) is an English actress who is famous for playing Janice Battersby in Coronation Street. She entered the house on Day 1 and left in sixth place on Day 23.

== Nominations table ==
	Day 4	Day 7	Day 11	Day 14	Day 18	Day 23 Final		Nominations received
Charlotte	Not eligible	Dustin, Lauren	Bruce, Abz	Dustin, Abz	Courtney, Carol	Winner (Day 23)		6
Abz	Not eligible	Carol, Courtney	Courtney, Sophie	Charlotte, Bruce	Courtney, Carol	Runner-up (Day 23)		3
Lauren	Ron, Danielle, Vicky	Ron, Sophie	Louie, Mario	Louie, Bruce	Louie, Mario	Third place (Day 23)		10
Carol	Not eligible	Lauren, Ron	Sophie, Bruce	Courtney	Louie, Mario	Fourth place (Day 23)		8
Mario	Not eligible	Courtney, Lauren	Bruce, Lauren	Dustin, Lauren	Vicky, Carol	Fifth place (Day 23)		3
Vicky	Not eligible	Louie	Courtney, Charlotte	Dustin, Louie	Courtney, Carol	Sixth place (Day 23)		5
Louie	Ron, Danielle, Vicky	Vicky, Ron	Bruce, Sophie	Dustin, Vicky	Courtney, Carol	Evicted (Day 21)		8
Courtney	Not eligible	Charlotte, Sophie	Carol, Charlotte	Mario, Abz	Vicky, Carol	Evicted (Day 21)		10
Bruce	Not eligible	Charlotte, Lauren	Lauren, Louie	Dustin, Lauren	Evicted (Day 16)			7
Dustin	Not eligible	Courtney, Charlotte	Louie, Lauren	Louie, Vicky	Evicted (Day 16)			6
Sophie	Ron, Danielle, Vicky	Courtney, Lauren	Courtney, Bruce	Evicted (Day 14)				5
Ron	Not eligible	Louie	Evicted (Day 9)					4
Danielle	Not eligible	Evicted (Day 7)						1
Notes	1	2	3	4	5	6		
Against public vote	Danielle, Ron, Vicky	Charlotte, Courtney, Lauren, Louie, Ron	Bruce, Courtney, Lauren, Louie, Sophie	Abz, Bruce, Courtney, Dustin, Lauren, Louie, Vicky	Carol, Courtney, Louie, Mario, Vicky	Abz, Carol, Charlotte, Lauren, Mario, Vicky		
Evicted	Danielle; Fewest votes to save	Ron; Fewest votes (out of 3) to save	Sophie; Fewest votes to save	Dustin; Fewest votes to save	Courtney; Fewest votes to save	Vicky; Fewest votes (out of 6)	Lauren; Fewest votes (out of 3)	
Evicted	Danielle; Fewest votes to save	Ron; Fewest votes (out of 3) to save	Sophie; Fewest votes to save	Dustin; Fewest votes to save	Courtney; Fewest votes to save	Mario; Fewest votes (out of 6)	Lauren; Fewest votes (out of 3)	
Evicted	Danielle; Fewest votes to save	Ron; Fewest votes (out of 3) to save	Sophie; Fewest votes to save	Dustin; Fewest votes to save	Courtney; Fewest votes to save	Mario; Fewest votes (out of 6)	Abz; Fewest votes (out of 2)	
Evicted	Danielle; Fewest votes to save	Ron; Fewest votes (out of 3) to save	Sophie; Fewest votes to save	Bruce; Fewest votes to save	Louie; Fewest votes to save	Carol; Fewest votes (out of 4)	Abz; Fewest votes (out of 2)	
Evicted	Danielle; Fewest votes to save	Ron; Fewest votes (out of 3) to save	Sophie; Fewest votes to save	Bruce; Fewest votes to save	Louie; Fewest votes to save	Charlotte; Most votes to win		

Notes

- ^Note 1: As the first three housemates to enter the house, Lauren, Louie and Sophie became the ‘Cult of Celebrity‘, and had to unanimously decide who would face the first eviction. They nominated Ron on Day 2, Danielle on Day 3 and Vicky on Day 4.
- ^Note 2: After the first eviction on Day 7, survivors Ron and Vicky were told they could jointly choose one housemate to automatically face the next public vote. They opted for Louie. All housemates except Ron and Vicky then nominated as normal, but could not nominate Louie.
- ^Note 3: As well as finding out they were nominated, Bruce, Courtney, Lauren, Louie and Sophie were shown who nominated them.
- ^Note 4: Upon her return to the house following her fake exit, Carol was given the opportunity to choose one housemate to automatically face the fourth eviction. She chose Courtney. All other housemates except Carol then nominated face-to-face, but could not nominate Courtney. The fourth eviction was a double eviction.
- ^Note 5: For the final round of nominations housemates had to nominate in pairs, each pair chose two housemates to face the public vote. The pairs were Abz & Charlotte, Carol & Lauren, Courtney & Mario and Louie & Vicky. The eviction was a double.
- ^Note 6: For the final two days the public were voting to win rather than to save.

== Cult of Celebrity ==
On launch night, it was revealed that there was a place adjacent to the Diary Room known as 'The Temple.' Later, Lauren, Louie and Sophie were chosen by Big Brother to become cult celebrities who would live in The Temple in secret, away from the rest of the housemates. It was then announced that they would have the power to nominate three housemates of their choice to face the first public vote.

Note: The cult celebrities, after putting forward their recommendations as to which housemate should be nominated, decided to nominate this housemate to face the first public vote.

	Day 2	Day 3	Day 4
Lauren	Carol	Courtney	Vicky
Louie	Ron	Abz	Bruce
Sophie	Courtney	Danielle	Courtney

== Summary ==
Day 1	Entrances	Bruce, Vicky, Courtney, Abz, Danielle, Dustin, Charlotte, Mario, Carol and Ron entered the house.; Louie, Lauren and Sophie entered The Temple.
Day 1	Tasks	Shortly after introductions, Big Brother tasked the housemates with picking the two people inside the house that they thought were the most famous; Bruce and Vicky were the two chosen. These two housemates were later told that as they were the two picked they would be awarded with special sleeping arrangements, which turned out to be a double bed located in the middle of the garden.
Day 1	Twists	It was explained that Lauren, Louie and Sophie would become the first three 'cult celebrities.' As cult celebrities, Lauren, Louie and Sophie entered The Temple, a place adjacent to the main house. Inside The Temple, the cult celebrities had the chance to watch the rest of their fellow housemates enter the main house. Lauren, Louie and Sophie were then given the power to decide upon three housemates of their choice to face the first public vote.
Day 2	Entrances	Lauren, Sophie and Louie entered the house.
Day 2	Tasks	The three cult celebrities entered one-by-one into the house for a special party on Day 2. They were not allowed to reveal any information on where they had been staying and that they had been living together elsewhere. The party was used as a ploy for the cult celebrities to reveal who they had chosen to nominate first. The nominee was revealed as the celebrity Louie gave his bottle of champagne to when he entered the party (Ron). Later, Big Brother told the housemates that it was the public who had chosen Ron to become the first nominee and that the public would continue to vote for who they wanted to nominate this week up until the fourth day.
Day 2	Nominations	Ron was nominated to face the first eviction by cult celebrities, Lauren, Louie and Sophie.
Day 2	Punishments	As punishment for using inappropriate language, Carol received her first formal warning.
Day 3	Tasks	Housemates participated in the task; 'Guess What?'. For this task, housemates had to reveal three stories about themselves to the rest of the group. Once a housemate had revealed their three stories, the rest of the group had to pick what they thought the viewers would select as the 'most interesting'. The more stories they guessed correctly as the 'most interesting', the more prizes the housemates won.
Day 3	Nominations	The cult celebrities nominated Danielle to join Ron in facing the first public vote.
Day 3	Punishments	Ron was issued with a formal warning after using language that Big Brother deemed potentially offensive.
Day 4	Tasks	For the task 'Busk Brother', each celebrity had to showcase their talent in the garden. Big Brother provided housemates with a money bag containing three gold coins. Before their respective performances, every celebrity had to place down their money bag in front of them, allowing any of their fellow housemates to place any number of their gold coins inside. Charlotte, as the housemate with the most gold coins in their money bag after everyone had performed, was the winner and won a plate of burger and chips as a reward.
Day 4	Nominations	The cult celebrities nominated Vicky to join Ron and Danielle in facing the first public vote.
Day 4	Twists	The cult celebrities were revealed and the housemates learnt that they, not the public as Big Brother had previously said, had nominated Ron, Danielle and Vicky for eviction.
Day 5	Tasks	Housemates began their first weekly shopping task: 'Time is Money.' To pass the task, the celebrities had to accumulate as much 'time' as possible by completing various tasks set for them by Big Brother. Failure to complete said tasks would result in any time earned previous being deducted. During the task, two celebrities had to become 'Clock Watchers' and watch the rest of the house at all times until told otherwise by Big Brother, whilst Louie was designated the role of 'Big Brother Cuckoo.'
Day 6	Tasks	Housemates passed the 'Time Is Money' shopping task today, thereby earning a luxury food budget for the impending week.
Day 7	Twists	Shortly after Danielle was evicted, as the first two housemates to survive eviction, Ron and Vicky were given the power to nominate one housemate who would automatically be up for the next eviction. They chose Louie to face eviction on Friday.
Day 7	Exits	Danielle was the first housemate to be evicted.
Day 7	Nominations	Shortly after Danielle's eviction, Ron and Vicky were given the power to nominate one housemate automatically to face the next public vote. They chose to nominate Louie. Louie, as a result of this, could still nominate but could not be nominated. Later that night, housemates nominated Charlotte, Courtney, Lauren and Ron for eviction. They joined Louie in facing the public vote.
Day 8	Tasks	Today, a 'Random Task Generator Machine' was placed in the house. Housemates spun the wheel at random to be given a task of any kind to complete. Tasks included: Bruce having to slap himself with a fish whilst telling his life story in one minute or less, and Mario having to slowdance with the housemate he thought was the most attractive whilst wearing a mankini. As all housemates completed their tasks to the satisfaction of Big Brother, Courtney won a slumber party for her 19th birthday. Big Brother told her she could share her slumber party reward with one other housemate; she chose Dustin.
Day 8	Punishments	As punishment for discussing nominations, the housemates lost their luxury shopping budget won earlier in the week, in addition to all hot water and electrical appliances being switched off until further notice.
Day 9	Exits	Ron became the second housemate to be evicted.
Day 10	Tasks	Housemates had to get into pairs and participate in a dance-off against their partner, with each pair's dance-off based on a specific theme. Each dance-off was judged by Louie, who had to pick the winner that would then be eligible to go to a party that night with him. Later that day, respective dance-off winners Abz, Courtney, Mario, Bruce and Carol joined Louie for the party.
Day 10	Punishments	As punishment for discussing nominations, Courtney and Sophie were sent to the jail in the garden and, once again, all hot water and electrical appliances were switched off.; Charlotte and Mario spent most of the day drawing over some of the housemates' faces on the memory wall and, as a punishment for doing so, they were required to draw over each other's faces and stay like this until further notice.
Day 11	Nominations	Bruce, Courtney, Lauren, Louie and Sophie faced eviction, having received the most votes during the second round of nominations. Courtney, Lauren and Louie therefore faced the public vote for the second consecutive round.
Day 11	Twists	Shortly after the nominees were revealed, Big Brother played into the house footage of who nominated them.
Day 12	Tasks	For the next shopping task, Carol, Lauren and Mario were kept as 'prisoners' by Mr. Big - or, so the other housemates thought. Instead, their mission was to pretend to be prisoners while actually living in luxury while getting the other celebrities to perform a series of demands that would enable their 'release.' For each demand, one of the prisoners had to become the non-existent Mr. Big and record a message using a voice-changer effect to be broadcast to those living in the house. Demands included: making the whole house live off of prisoner food (for example: chicken feet); getting Charlotte to drink three non-alcoholic lagers and eat three kebabs in just three minutes; offering Courtney the chance to meet her husband, who 'Mr. Big' had also trapped, in exchange for all of her personal possessions - as she accepted, she had to wear dirty overalls only; forcing Dustin to become his character Screech from Saved by the Bell by getting the rest of the housemates to shave some of his beard off and supply him with a curly wig; making Louie perform a dance on top of 'glass' which was not harmful and, finally, getting the house to pick the three laziest housemates who all had their beds removed in exchange for new uncomfortable straw bedding.
Day 13	Tasks	The weekly shopping task continued with more demands made to the house by the fictional character, Mr. Big. Demands included: making Abz perform his band Five's song "If Ya Gettin' Down" five times and giving Bruce and Vicky a script to follow that required them to fill in the names of the housemates that they thought most appropriate for the lines. Later that day, Mr. Big revealed the 'prison' twist to the rest of the house and the results of the task. The housemates not only received an economy food budget for failing but as a further punishment for housemates' failure to comply with demands successfully during the task, they had to evict one of the prisoners. Housemates almost unanimously chose to sacrifice Carol.
Day 13	Twists	Carol was fake evicted as part of a twist after the failure of this week's shopping task (see Tasks) and moved to the 'prison' where she stayed for the next twenty-four hours in secret.
Day 14	Tasks	Big Brother challenged the celebrities in a battle of the sexes task that involved the men going up against the women in a series of challenges in Big Brother's Muscle Arena. For the first challenge, entitled 'Milkshake Shaky Shake', Bruce and Vicky were handed protein shakes whilst on a balance-board until they could not support themselves or the drinks any longer. The first to drop all of their drinks would lose the game; Vicky was the winner. In the next challenge, 'Punch Your Way Out Of A Paper Bag', Lauren and Mario went head-to-head for their respective teams to find out which one of them could successfully punch their way out of a paper bag first. Mario won and received one point. In the final challenge, 'Gunge Dip', Dustin and Charlotte were required to hold onto a triceps bar for as long as they could, with Dustin as the first person to let go being gunged. Overall, the girls team, who won the majority of the challenges, were revealed as the winners. They won a selection of sweet treats to eat later that day.
Day 14	Exits	Sophie was the third housemate to be evicted this series.
Day 14	Twists	Carol re-entered the house following Sophie's exit, and was given the power to automatically nominate one housemate for eviction by Big Brother. She chose to nominate Courtney.
Day 14	Nominations	Before the next round of nominations began, Carol was given the power to automatically nominate one housemate for eviction, in which she chose to nominate Courtney. Courtney, although automatically against the public vote, was still eligible to nominate but could not be nominated.; The next round of nominations took place face-to-face, with Abz, Bruce, Courtney, Dustin, Lauren, Louie and Vicky receiving the most votes from their fellow housemates.
Day 16	Tasks	Charlotte and Mario, being reality television stars, were tasked with making up fellow housemates Courtney and Dustin to look and act like they would in their reality shows. First, they gave each of them a makeover. Next, Courtney and Dustin were required to act like a couple during a scene in the treehouse, renamed 'Lauren's Bar' as part of the task, before having an argument devised by Charlotte and Mario. As they passed the task, Courtney and Dustin were awarded with some sweet American style treats.
Day 16	Exits	In a double eviction, Dustin and Bruce were the fourth and fifth celebrities to leave the show respectively.
Day 17	Entrances	Vanessa Feltz entered the house for the day's task. She had previously appeared in the first series of Celebrity Big Brother and most recently in Ultimate Big Brother.
Day 17	Tasks	During Vanessa's brief stay, she had to deliver the viewers thoughts and opinions from the show's official Facebook page to the housemates via 'BBFM.' Housemates were awarded with a special lunch for taking part in the task.
Day 18	Tasks	The celebrities were told to partner up with a pre-selected housemate, whom they had to remain tethered to via wrist straps until the end of the day. This subsequently meant that the celebrities nominated in their pairs (see Nominations). The pairs were: Abz and Charlotte, Carol and Lauren, Courtney and Mario, and Louie and Vicky. The pairs were tasked with shredding one of two housemates' letters each. This subsequently meant Charlotte, Courtney, Lauren and Louie did not receive their letters.
Day 18	Nominations	In the fifth and final round, housemates nominated in their pre-selected pairs that were determined earlier for the day's task (see Tasks). In each pair, both housemates collectively decided which two of their fellow housemates they wanted to nominate. Those who they chose could be from different pairs to one another. Carol, Courtney, Louie, Mario and Vicky received the most nomination votes and faced the last eviction before the final. Abz, Charlotte and Lauren were therefore finalists.
Day 19	Entrances	Bit on the Side presenter Rylan Clark and ex-housemates Danielle and Sophie entered the house for the day's task (see Tasks).
Day 19	Tasks	Rylan Clark and ex-housemates Danielle and Sophie entered the house for the day's task; 'Big Brother's Bitchfest.' They debated issues inside and outside of the house whilst the celebrity housemates acted as the 'studio audience'. Issues of interest included Courtney's apparent flirting with Mario, what constitutes a celebrity and if your age means you should act it. The task was passed later that day and, as a reward, the celebrities won a party.; Mario was set a secret task to recover the letters of the four housemates (Charlotte, Courtney, Lauren and Louie) who did not receive their letters in the previous task. He had to write the name of one housemate within a sentence on four tennis balls and hide every tennis ball around the house. He had to make sure they were found. Mario successfully did so and as a result Charlotte, Courtney, Lauren and Louie received their letters.
Day 20	Punishments	As punishment for discussing nominations, despite doing so in her sleep, Carol was sent to the jail in the garden.
Day 21	Tasks	Celebrities competed in the 'Battle of the Bands' competition, which saw Carol, Charlotte, Courtney and Louie form 'The Jumbles' band and Abz, Lauren, Mario, and Vicky form 'Malv4.' Each band was required to write their own original song about their journey in the house and had to also choreograph a dance routine, choose a band name and restyle themselves using clothes provided by Big Brother. The Jumbles were deemed the winners and won a luxury rider as a reward.; Later that night, housemates had to attend a special awards ceremony, where they could receive rewards voted for by the viewers: Housemate / Award(s); Abz / None; Carol / Biggest Villain; Charlotte / Funniest Housemate, Most Entertaining Housemate, Most Dramatic Moment (joint); Courtney / None; Lauren / Biggest Game Player; Louie / None; Mario / Biggest Flirt, Sexiest Housemate; Vicky / Most Dramatic Moment (joint)
Day 21	Exits	Courtney and Louie were the sixth and seventh celebrities respectively to be evicted from the house.
Day 23	Exits	Vicky was the eighth housemate to leave the house. She was shortly followed by Mario, whom was then followed by Carol and Lauren. Charlotte was announced as the winner of the series, meaning Abz was this year's runner-up.

== Production ==
=== Logo ===
The official new eye logo for the series was released on 1 August 2013. The new logo design followed the same pattern as for Big Brother 14, but with a new golden theme. The new icon featured the doors, drawers and wooden frame of the fourteenth civilian series' eye – but it was recoloured in gold and navy blue to give it a VIP feel to tie in with the 'posh' theme of the series. Unlike most Celebrity Big Brother eyes, this logo did not feature the "star" in the centre.

=== Presenters ===
On 2 April 2013, Emma Willis was officially announced as the host of Celebrity Big Brother, after previous host Brian Dowling was removed. Willis also presented Celebrity Big Brother's Bit on the Side alongside Rylan Clark and AJ Odudu, who replaced Alice Levine and Jamie East from the fourteenth regular series.

=== Sponsorship ===
The series sponsor was casino website and television programme (that airs nightly on Channel 5) SuperCasino.

=== Teasers ===
From 16 August 2013, Channel 5 began screening a ten-second trailer celebrating the return of the series. The trailer featured the obligatory voiceover of Marcus Bentley, and showcased the newest Celebrity Big Brother logo.

=== House ===
Pictures of the house were released on 22 August 2013. The house contained a 'posh' theme, with luxurious fittings in and outside of the Celebrity Big Brother compound. This was in stark contrast to the eco-style house that was in use just three days before in the fourteenth regular series.

== Ratings ==
Official ratings are taken from BARB and include Channel 5 +1.

	Official viewers (millions)			
	Week 1		Week 2	Week 3
Saturday		2.25	1.69	1.73
Sunday		1.87	2.23	2.17
Monday		2.22	2.38	2.15
Tuesday		2.32	2.44	2.19
Wednesday		2.05	2.32	2.3
Wednesday		2.05	1.92	2.3
Thursday	2.98	2.22	1.88	1.78
Friday	2.49	2.28	2.18	1.15
Friday	2.49	2.28	2.18	2.43
Friday	2.49	2.28	2.18	2.09
Weekly average	2.3		2.13	2
Running average	2.28		2.22	2.14
Series average	2.14			
blue-coloured boxes denote live shows.

== Controversy ==
On Day 2, Carol McGiffin received a formal warning from Big Brother after using the word "nigger" in a conversation with Louie Spence. The warning attracted some criticism from viewers as Carol was quoting what Ron Atkinson had said during his time as a football pundit. Viewers were also critical of the fact that "nigger" was censored when Carol used it in said conversation with Louie, but when Big Brother referenced it when speaking to her, it was left uncensored.

On Day 3, Ron was given a formal warning by Big Brother after he commented to Danielle Marr, "You're not carrying a bomb with you, are you?" while she had her jumper over her head in similar fashion to a headscarf, which is commonly worn by Muslim women. Ron was then called to the Diary Room where Big Brother told him that his comments could be deemed "potentially offensive".

On Day 5, Mario Falcone was called to the Diary Room and given an official warning by Big Brother after "slapping" Sophie Anderton while playfighting in the garden.

On Day 8, Lauren Harries was given a formal warning by Big Brother after she attempted to share some of her medication with Courtney Stodden. Lauren put some of her tablets in Courtney's mouth and told her to have a drink after Courtney complained about feeling unwell.
