= Celebrity Big Brother (British TV series) series 16 =

Celebrity Big Brother
- Series 16
- Series sixteen logo
- Presented by: Emma Willis
- No. of days: 29
- No. of housemates: 14
- Winner: James Hill
- Runner-up: Austin Armacost
- Companion shows: Big Brother's Bit on the Side
- No. of episodes: 29

Release
- Original network: Channel 5
- Original release: 27 August – 24 September 2015

Series chronology
- ← Previous; Series 15 Next → Series 17

Celebrity Big Brother 16, also known as Celebrity Big Brother: UK vs USA, is the sixteenth series of the British reality television series Celebrity Big Brother, hosted by Emma Willis and narrated by Marcus Bentley. The series launched on 27 August 2015 on Channel 5 in the United Kingdom and TV3 in Ireland, and ended after 29 days on 24 September 2015. It is the ninth celebrity series and the fourteenth series of Big Brother overall to air on Channel 5. It was the only celebrity series to credit Denis O'Connor as creative director.

James Hill was named as the winner on 24 September.

== Format ==
Celebrity Big Brother is a game show in which a group of celebrity contestants, referred to as housemates, live in isolation from the outside world in a custom built "house", constantly under video surveillance. During their time in the House, the housemates are required to nominate two of their fellow contestants for potential eviction, and the two or more with the most votes would be nominated. This process is mandatory for all housemates, and failure to comply could result in expulsion from the House. The public then vote, with one of those celebrities evicted from the house. When the final week arrives, the viewers vote for which of the remaining celebrities should win the series, and the housemate with the most votes becomes the winner.

During their time in the House, housemates are given weekly tasks to perform. The housemates wager a portion of their weekly shopping budget on the task, and either win double their wagered fund or lose the wagered fund depending on their performance in the task. The housemates are required to work as a group to complete their tasks, with the format of the tasks varying based on the number of remaining housemates. Throughout the series, some housemates have been given secret tasks that must either be completed individually or with a small group; failure to do so can result in the housemate being nominated or punished in the House. Should the housemates run out of the food provided for them, an emergency ration was available to them. The housemates are forbidden from discussing nominations, and doing so could result in punishment. The format of the series is mainly seen as a social experiment, and requires housemates to interact with others who may have differing ideals, beliefs, and prejudices. Housemates are also required to make visits to the Diary Room during their stay in the House, where they are able to share their thoughts and feelings on their fellow housemates and the game.

== Housemates ==
Celebrity	Age on entry	Notability	Day entered	Day exited	Status
James Hill	28	Reality TV star	1	29	Winner
Austin Armacost	27	Reality TV star	1	29	Runner-up
Natasha Hamilton	33	Singer	1	29	3rd place
Bobby Davro	56	Comedian	2	29	4th place
Stevi Ritchie (Note: Stevi and Chloe-Jasmine entered the House together on Day 1 and were treated as a single Housemate under the collective name "Stevi & Chloe-Jasmine" for the duration of the series.)	34	Singers and Reality TV stars	1	29	5th place
Chloe-Jasmine Whichello	26	Singers and Reality TV stars	1	29	5th place
Sherrie Hewson	64	Actress	1	29	6th place
Janice Dickinson	60	Model	2	27	Evicted
Jenna Jameson	41	Porn star	1	27	Evicted
Farrah Abraham	24	Reality TV star	1	23	Evicted
Gail Porter	44	TV presenter	1	20	Evicted
Fatman Scoop †	47	Rapper	1	20	Evicted
Chris Ellison	68	Actor	1	13	Evicted
Daniel Baldwin	54	Actor	1	9	Evicted
Tila Tequila	33	Internet personality and reality TV star	1	2	Ejected

Future Appearances

Austin Armacost returned to the house for Celebrity Big Brother 19 as an All-Star, representing this series.

=== Austin Armacost ===
Austin Armacost is an American reality television personality, who is best known for his role in The A-List: New York, as well as dating fashion designer Marc Jacobs. He entered the House on Day 1. He left the House on Day 29 as the runner-up. He later returned to compete in Celebrity Big Brother 19 as an "All star" housemate.

=== Bobby Davro ===
Bobby Davro is an English actor and comedian best known for his work as an impressionist. He made his television debut in 1981, but it wasn't until 1983 that he made his television breakthrough at Live from Her Majesty's, followed by appearances on the television show, Who Do You Do?. He entered the House on Day 2, competing against Janice Dickinson in order to win the title of "Prime Minister". He finished in fourth place on Day 29.

=== Chris Ellison ===
Chris Ellison is an English actor. He is best known for his role as DCI Frank Burnside in the popular ITV police series The Bill and short-lived spin-off series Burnside. He entered the House on Day 1 representing Team UK. On Day 13 he became the second Housemate to be evicted.

=== Daniel Baldwin ===
Daniel Baldwin is an American actor, film director and film producer. He is the second eldest of the four Baldwin brothers, all of whom are actors (one of whom Stephen Baldwin, appeared in Celebrity Big Brother 7) as well as part of the Baldwin family. Baldwin is known for his role as Detective Beau Felton in the popular NBC TV series Homicide: Life on the Street. He entered the House on Day 1 representing Team USA, but became the first Housemate to be evicted on Day 9.

=== Farrah Abraham ===
Farrah Abraham is an American television personality. She came to prominence after being cast in the reality television series 16 and Pregnant, which documented the pregnancies and first months of motherhood for several young women. She then became part of the spin-off series, Teen Mom until it was axed in 2012. The show was revived for the fifth season in 2015 as Teen Mom: Original Girls. She entered the House on Day 1. On Day 16 she was fake evicted along with Jenna and moved into Big Brother's Luxury Suite where they spied on the other Housemates until their return on Day 18. Unbeknownst to them, the other Housemates were in on the secret. She became the fifth Housemate to be evicted following an eviction showdown on Day 23.

=== Gail Porter ===
Gail Porter is a Scottish television presenter and personality, and former model. In the 1990s she became known for photos in men's magazines such as FHM, including one nude which was projected on to the Houses of Parliament. She moved into television, becoming a presenter. Her career was affected by alopecia, which in her case resulted in a total loss of her hair. She entered the House on Day 1. On Day 20 she became the fourth Housemate to be evicted.

=== James Hill ===
James Hill is an English reality television personality, who rose to fame following his appearance during the tenth series of The Apprentice. He entered the House on Day 1. On Day 29 he was announced as the winner of the series.

=== Janice Dickinson ===
Janice Dickinson is an American model, photographer, author and talent agent. Initially notable as a model, she has been described by herself and others as the first supermodel. She finished as runner-up on the seventh series of I'm a Celebrity...Get Me Out of Here!. She entered the House on Day 2, competing against Bobby Davro in order to win the title of "President". Janice became the seventh Housemate to be evicted on Day 27.

=== Jenna Jameson ===
Jenna Jameson is an American entrepreneur, webcam model and former pornographic film actress, who has been called the world's most famous adult-entertainment performer and "The Queen of Porn". She entered the House on Day 1. On Day 16 she was fake evicted along with Farrah and moved into Big Brother's Luxury Suite where they spied on the other Housemates until their return on Day 18. Unbeknownst to them, the other Housemates were in on the secret. She became the sixth Housemate to be evicted on Day 27.

=== Natasha Hamilton ===
Natasha Hamilton is an English singer-songwriter, dancer and occasional stage actress. She is a member of girl group Atomic Kitten. She entered the House on Day 1. She finished in third place on Day 29.

=== Fatman Scoop ===
Isaac Freeman III, better known by his stage name Fatman Scoop (or simply Scoop), was an American hype man, hip hop promoter and radio personality famed for his on-stage rough, raw, loud voice. He is known for the song "Be Faithful" which went to number one in the UK and Ireland in late 2003 and top 5 in Australia. He entered the House on Day 1. On Day 10, Scoop was voted as President of the House. He became the third Housemate to be evicted from the House on Day 20.

=== Sherrie Hewson ===
Sherrie Hewson is an English actress, presenter, broadcaster, television personality and novelist. She is best known for her roles in Coronation Street, Crossroads, Emmerdale and Benidorm. Since 2003, she has also been a regular panellist on lunchtime chat show Loose Women. She entered the House on Day 1. She finished in sixth place on Day 29.

=== Stevi Ritchie and Chloe-Jasmine Whichello ===
Stevi Ritchie and Chloe-Jasmine Whichello, the latter of whom is better known by her stage name Chloe Jasmine, are a couple who appeared (separately) in the eleventh series of The X Factor. They entered the House on Day 1 competing as one Housemate. They finished in fifth place on Day 29.

=== Tila Tequila ===
Thien Nguyen, better known by her stage names Tila Tequila and Miss Tila (or simply Tila), is an American model, television personality, singer, songwriter, actress, writer and blogger. She entered the House on Day 1 as an American contestant. However, she was ejected on her second day in the House after it was discovered that she had posted items on social media proclaiming her support for Adolf Hitler, Nazism and white supremacism, along with photos of herself in Nazi outfits.

== House guests ==
=== Paul Burrell ===
On Day 6, Paul Burrell, a former British Royal Household servant, footman and butler, entered the House to accommodate the "Big Brother Royal Family" task. He left the House on Day 9.

=== Jennie Bond ===
On Day 7, Jennie Bond, a British journalist and television presenter, briefly entered the House as part of the "Big Brother Royal Family" task where she interviewed Lord James and Lady Natasha. Both were unaware that the American servants were watching from the potato-peeling tower.

=== Emma Willis ===
On Day 23, presenter Emma Willis briefly entered the House as part of an eviction showdown leading to Farrah's departure. Willis then immediately left the House to prepare for her interview.

=== Eamonn Holmes ===
On Day 27, Eamonn Holmes briefly entered the House as part of the "Battle of the Nations" task, in which he would ask questions to the Housemates about the public's perception of them. He later returned that day as a guest on Big Brother's Bit on the Side, which was presented from inside the House.

== Nominations table ==
Key:

Team UK
Team USA

		Day 6	Day 11	Day 13	Day 18	Day 20	Day 25	Day 29 Final		Nominations received
(United Kingdom)	James	Janice, Farrah	Not eligible	Stevi & Chloe-Jasmine, Farrah	Not eligible	No nominations	Jenna, Austin	Winner (Day 29)		3
(United States)	Austin	Farrah, Janice	Bobby, Stevi & Chloe-Jasmine, Gail	Farrah, Stevi & Chloe-Jasmine	Not eligible	No nominations	Janice, Bobby	Runner-up (Day 29)		6
(United Kingdom)	Natasha	Farrah, Janice	Not eligible	Farrah, Jenna	Not eligible	No nominations	Jenna, Austin	Third Place (Day 29)		2
(United Kingdom)	Bobby	Jenna, Farrah	Not eligible	Farrah, Gail	Not eligible	No nominations	Janice, Austin	Fourth Place (Day 29)		8
(United Kingdom)	Stevi & Chloe-Jasmine	Farrah, Daniel	Not eligible	Farrah, Austin	Not eligible	No nominations	Jenna, Austin	Fifth Place (Day 29)		9
(United Kingdom)	Sherrie	Jenna, Farrah	Not eligible	Farrah, Jenna	Not eligible	No nominations	Janice, Bobby	Sixth Place (Day 29)		3
(United States)	Janice	Farrah, Daniel	Bobby, Stevi & Chloe-Jasmine, Gail	Gail, Scoop	Not eligible	No nominations	Jenna, Bobby	Evicted (Day 27)		8
(United States)	Jenna	Stevi & Chloe-Jasmine, Chris	Bobby, Stevi & Chloe-Jasmine, Gail	Bobby, Stevi & Chloe-Jasmine	Austin, Natasha, Bobby, James, Sherrie	No nominations	Janice, Bobby	Evicted (Day 27)		9
(United States)	Farrah	James, Stevi & Chloe-Jasmine	Bobby, Stevi & Chloe-Jasmine, Gail	Natasha, James	Austin, Natasha, Bobby, James, Sherrie	No nominations	Evicted (Day 23)			14
(United Kingdom)	Gail	Farrah, Daniel	Not eligible	Stevi & Chloe-Jasmine, Bobby	Not eligible	Evicted (Day 20)				3
(United States)	Scoop	Sherrie, Chris	Chris, Bobby, Stevi & Chloe-Jasmine, Gail	Stevi & Chloe-Jasmine, Sherrie	Not eligible	Evicted (Day 20)				1
(United Kingdom)	Chris	Jenna, Daniel	Not eligible	Evicted (Day 13)						3
(United States)	Daniel	Janice, Stevi & Chloe-Jasmine	Evicted (Day 9)							4
(United States)	Tila	Ejected (Day 2)								N/A
Notes		none	1	2	3	4	5	6		
Against public vote		Chris, Daniel, Farrah, Janice, Jenna, Stevi & Chloe-Jasmine	Bobby, Chris, Gail, Stevi & Chloe-Jasmine	Bobby, Farrah, Gail, Jenna, Stevi & Chloe-Jasmine	Gail, Janice, Scoop, Stevi & Chloe-Jasmine	Austin, Bobby, Farrah, James, Janice, Jenna, Natasha, Sherrie, Stevi & Chloe-Jasmine	Austin, Bobby, Janice, Jenna	Austin, Bobby, James, Natasha, Sherrie, Stevi & Chloe-Jasmine		
Ejected		Tila	none							
Evicted		Daniel; Fewest votes to save	Chris; Fewest votes to save	Farrah; Most votes to fake evict	Scoop; Fewest votes to save	Farrah; Austin's choice (out of 2) to evict	Jenna; Fewest votes to save	Sherrie; 1.54% (out of 6)	Natasha; 12.57% (out of 3)	
Evicted		Daniel; Fewest votes to save	Chris; Fewest votes to save	Farrah; Most votes to fake evict	Scoop; Fewest votes to save	Farrah; Austin's choice (out of 2) to evict	Jenna; Fewest votes to save	Stevi & Chloe-Jasmine; 1.82% (out of 5)	Natasha; 12.57% (out of 3)	
Evicted		Daniel; Fewest votes to save	Chris; Fewest votes to save	Farrah; Most votes to fake evict	Scoop; Fewest votes to save	Farrah; Austin's choice (out of 2) to evict	Jenna; Fewest votes to save	Stevi & Chloe-Jasmine; 1.82% (out of 5)	Austin; 33.83% (out of 2)	
Evicted		Daniel; Fewest votes to save	Chris; Fewest votes to save	Jenna; Most votes to fake evict	Gail; Fewest votes to save	Farrah; Austin's choice (out of 2) to evict	Janice; Fewest votes to save	Bobby; 5.09% (out of 4)	Austin; 33.83% (out of 2)	
Evicted		Daniel; Fewest votes to save	Chris; Fewest votes to save	Jenna; Most votes to fake evict	Gail; Fewest votes to save	Farrah; Austin's choice (out of 2) to evict	Janice; Fewest votes to save	James; 45.16% to win		

Notes

- ^Note 1: As Team USA won a task on Day 10, they were granted the right to nominate as Scoop became President of the House. In addition, as Team USA won, Team UK will not be allowed to nominate and will be the only ones able to be nominated. Later that day, President Scoop was forced to make a killer nomination against one Housemate, meaning they would automatically face the public vote. On Day 11, Team USA then collectively decided three more Housemates who would also face the public vote with Chris. They chose Bobby, Gail, and Stevi & Chloe-Jasmine.
- ^Note 2: This week, the Housemates nominated face-to-face. However, in a twist, the public were voting to fake evict rather than to save, with the two Housemates receiving the most votes fake evicted and moved into a secret Luxury Suite. In a further twist, the other Housemates will be made aware of this, unbeknownst to the residents of the Suite.
- ^Note 3: As residents of the Luxury Suite, Farrah and Jenna are immune from nominations, and will be in control of who will face the public vote. However, unbeknownst to them, whoever they believe to have nominated for eviction will be immune from the public vote. The Housemates in the main house will be made aware of this and will have to try to get nominated in order to be immune from the next eviction, and whoever is not chosen will face the public vote.
- ^Note 4: This week all Housemates automatically faced the public vote. The four Housemates with the most votes will be saved, while the five remaining Housemates will be subject to an eviction twist. The four saved housemates (Austin, James, Natasha and Stevi & Chloe-Jasmine) had to pick one of the five remaining housemates (Bobby, Farrah, Janice, Jenna and Sherrie) to save from eviction. Natasha saved Sherrie, James saved Janice, Stevi & Chloe-Jasmine saved Bobby and ultimately Austin chose to evict Farrah thus saving Jenna from eviction.
- ^Note 5: In addition to finding out who was nominated on Day 25, Housemates were also shown who nominated them.
- ^Note 6: For the final two days, the public were voting to win rather than to save. The voting percentages reflect the overall share of the final vote and do not take into account the vote freezes between each position. James won with 57.17% of the vote over Austin.

== Summary ==
Day 1	Entrances	Sherrie, Scoop, Natasha, Austin, Gail, Chris, Jenna, Stevi & Chloe-Jasmine, Farrah, James, Tila and Daniel entered the house.
Day 1	Tasks	Housemates were split into two teams consisting of the UK Housemates (Gail, Natasha, Chris, Stevi & Chloe-Jasmine, James and Sherrie) and the USA Housemates (Austin, Farrah, Jenna, Scoop, Tila and Daniel). One by one, each Housemate from both teams would take turns to try and aim for the six Housemate targets from their opposing teams, whilst firing footballs out of a glitter cannon. The UK team ultimately won the task with three out of six targets hit, and were awarded with a special party. However, they had to select three USA Housemates who wouldn't be invited to the party and would instead spend time in the tower until further notice. They chose Daniel, Scoop and Farrah.
Day 2	Entrances	Bobby and Janice entered the house.
Day 2	Tasks	Bobby and Janice were selected as team captains for the UK and USA respectively, and competed against each other in a series of challenges in order to become "Prime Minister" or "President" of the House. These challenges included answering questions which related to British and American culture, correctly spelling famous colloquialisms, drinking liquefied substances and putting as many clothing items on in one minute. At the end of the task, Bobby was announced as the winner, thus becoming "Prime Minister" of the House.
Day 2	Exits	Tila was ejected from the House, following awareness of social media comments that she made prior to entering the house, where she expressed her support for Adolf Hitler, Nazism and white supremacism.
Day 3	Tasks	Dizzy Dash: The Housemates, in their respective teams, were spun around in a cart whilst being asked a question about one of their fellow Housemates. When the cart stopped spinning, they had to run down a small track and cross the finish line, with the first Housemate to cross the finish line being able to answer the question to win a point for their team.
Day 4	Punishments	Janice was given a formal warning for appearing to spit at Austin.
Day 5	Exits	Janice left the House temporarily to receive emergency medical attention after having an allergic reaction to a wasp sting.
Day 6	Nominations	Housemates nominated for the first time. Chris, Daniel, Farrah, Janice, Jenna, and Stevi & Chloe-Jasmine received the most nominations and faced the public vote.
Day 6	Tasks	Big Brother's Royal Family: For the Housemates' first shopping task, the House was transformed into a Royal Palace with the UK Housemates becoming the monarchy, and the USA Housemates being their servants. The servants were joined by House guest Paul Burrell, who assigned roles for the servants and, throughout the course of the week, will teach them how to reach Royal standards in order to help them pass the task.
Day 6	Entrances	Paul Burrell entered the House to participate in this week's shopping task.
Day 7	Tasks	Housemates continued with their first shopping task. It was revealed to the American Housemates that the real goal of the task was to disgrace the royal family and expose them in situations where they lack etiquette and decorum. Today, the American Housemates were instructed to write up questions for a royal interview with Natasha and James. Later that day, Big Brother tasked the servants with taking photos of the Royal Family in compromising shots.
Day 8	Tasks	Housemates continued with their first shopping tasks. The American Housemates were tasked with choosing two of their own (Austin and Farrah) to sit in on afternoon tea with four members of the Royal Family (Chloe-Jasmine, Gail, James, and Natasha). Austin and Farrah had the task of making the members of the Royal Family angry, ruining afternoon tea. Later that day, it was revealed to the British Housemates the true nature of the shopping task. Big Brother then informed all Housemates that they had passed the task and would be rewarded with a luxury shopping budget for the week.
Day 8	Punishments	Farrah was given a formal warning for using offensive language during the last part of the shopping task.
Day 9	Tasks	The Newlywed Game: Stevi & Chloe-Jasmine were tasked with answering questions about each other in the same style as The Newlywed Game. Stevi & Chloe-Jasmine answered enough questions correctly and passed the task. For passing the task, they were rewarded with a romantic picnic later that day.
Day 9	Exits	Paul left the House.; Daniel was evicted from the house, receiving the fewest votes to save.
Day 10	Tasks	And the Weiner is...: Team UK and Team USA competed in a giant hot dog making competition. Housemates were to dress up as hotdogs and slid into a hotdog bun. Bobby and Janice would then measure how close each person was to the centre of the target. The team with the lowest collective distance would win the task. Team USA won the task and were then given the power to vote for a President of the House. They chose Scoop.
Day 10	Twists	Due to Team USA winning the task earlier in the day, they were all granted immunity from the next eviction and were the only Housemates able to nominate. Also, as President of the House, Scoop was forced to nominate one of the UK Housemates with a killer nomination. He chose Chris, meaning Chris automatically faced the next public vote.
Day 10	Nominations	Team USA were the only housemates to nominate this week. They all had to agree on three of the UK housemates to nominate. They nominated Bobby, Stevi & Chloe-Jasmine and Gail. As President, Scoop was able to give a killer nomination. He nominated Chris, meaning Bobby, Chris, Gail and Stevi & Chloe-Jasmine faced the public vote.
Day 10	Punishments	As punishment for Chloe-Jasmine, James, and Janice discussing nominations, the hot water in the House was turned off until further notice.
Day 13	Exits	Chris was evicted from the house, receiving the fewest votes to save.
Day 13	Nominations	The housemates all nominated for the second time. Bobby, Farrah, Gail, Jenna and Stevi & Chloe-Jasmine received the most nominations and faced the public vote.
Day 18	Exits	Farrah and Jenna were fake evicted and sent to the Luxury Suite.
Day 18	Twists	As residents of the Luxury Suite, Farrah and Jenna were immune from nominations, and were in control of who will face the public vote. However, unbeknownst to them, whoever they believed they nominated for eviction, will actually be immune from the public vote. The housemates in the main house were made aware of this and tried to get nominated in order to be immune from the next eviction.
Day 18	Nominations	Farrah and Jenna nominated Austin, Bobby, James, Natasha and Sherrie for eviction. They instead became immune, meaning Gail, Janice, Scoop and Stevi & Chloe-Jasmine faced the public vote.
Day 20	Exits	Scoop and Gail were evicted from the house, respectively, receiving the fewest votes to save.
Day 23	Exits	Emma Willis entered the House as part of an eviction showdown. As all nine remaining Housemates faced the public vote, the four with the most votes to save; Austin, James, Natasha and Stevi & Chloe-Jasmine were asked to randomly stand behind another podium which unknown to them had a hidden number on them. This would be the order in which they would save their fellow Housemates. Natasha went first and saved Sherrie, followed by James who saved Janice, then Stevi & Chloe-Jasmine who saved Bobby. This then left Austin with the decisive vote. He chose to save Jenna meaning Farrah was evicted.
Day 25	Nominations	The housemates all nominated for the third and final time. Austin, Bobby, Janice and Jenna received the most nominations and faced the public vote.
Day 27	Exits	Jenna and Janice were evicted from the house, respectively, receiving the fewest votes to save.
Day 29	Exits	Sherrie left the house in sixth place, Stevi & Chloe-Jasmine left the house in fifth place, Bobby left the house in fourth place and Natasha left the house in third place. It was revealed that James was the winner, leaving Austin as the runner-up.

== Production ==
=== Live streaming ===
On 14 August 2015, it was revealed that Channel 5 had partially reinstated live streaming from the House. For the first time since 2013, live streaming would air every weekday between midnight and 1am on 5*. Thirty minutes of live streaming will also air on Channel 5 after the live eviction show on Friday, meaning 90 minutes of live streaming will air every Friday.

=== Best bits series ===
On 20 August 2015, it was revealed that a special six-part best bits series would be airing every Saturday night on 5*. The series will look back at some of the best moments from Celebrity Big Brother history and will feature a range of special guests. Each episode would have its own topic, the first being "Heroes vs Villains", with the second being "Flirty Friendships and more". The series began on 29 August 2015.

=== Bit on the Side ===
Channel 5 confirmed on 31 July 2015 that Big Brother's Bit on the Side would be airing seven nights a week for the first time since 2014. The weekday episodes will air on Channel 5, with the weekend episodes airing on 5*.

=== Teasers ===
The first five-second teaser for Celebrity Big Brother aired on 31 July 2015 confirming the theme UK v USA. Channel 5 later revealed the full length advert on 7 August 2015. The advert featured hosts Emma Willis and Rylan Clark.

=== Sponsorship ===
Lucozade returns to sponsor Celebrity Big Brother after previously sponsoring Big Brother 16 earlier in the year.

=== House ===
The house was redecorated following the sixteenth civilian series. The house was decorated with British and American iconography to suit the UK v USA theme. House pictures were officially revealed on 23 August 2015.

== Ratings ==
Official ratings are taken from BARB.

	Official viewers (millions)				
	Week 1		Week 2	Week 3	Week 4
Saturday		1.34^{1}	1.49	1.40^{1}	1.24^{1}
Sunday		1.71	1.72	2.02	1.68
Monday		2.10	1.99	2.28	1.85
Tuesday		2.09	1.76	1.99	2.08
Wednesday		1.88	1.94	2.02	1.73
Thursday	2.66	2.01	2.09	2.02	2.05
Friday	2.03	1.96	1.84	1.77	
Weekly average	1.97		1.83	1.93	1.77
Running average	1.97		1.90	1.91	1.88
Series average	1.9				
blue-coloured boxes denote live shows.

^{1}Ratings for these episodes do not include Channel 5 +1.
