= Garment Quarter =

Coordinates: 51.45801°N 2.586578°W

- Industry: fashion clothing retailer
- Founded: 2010
- Founder: John Reid; Christopher Atkinson; Michael Barker
- Headquarters: Bristol, England

Garment Quarter is an independent designer fashion boutique that was founded in Bristol, England in 2010 by John Reid, Christopher Atkinson and Michael Barker. The shop was recently acquired by Teesside entrepreneur Howard Eggleston. The acquisition brought a relocation of the store and head offices to Merchant Street, Bristol.

The name Garment Quarter stems from New York's Garment District and the founders roots in Manchester's Northern Quarter.

Designed in Manchester, the contemporary architecture of the store was based on a cocoon with monochrome shards framed by contrasting pine wood with products 'floating' on a unique wiring system.

In 2011, Garment Quarter won 'Best New Business' at the Drapers's Fashion Awards and has been included in the top shopping destination guides for The Daily Telegraph, The Times and British Airways Executive Club.

Garment Quarter continues to have strong relationships with designers Vivienne Westwood, Alexander McQueen, Victoria Beckham and Comme des Garcons. In 2014 Garment Quarter supported London Collections: MEN designers KTZ and Sibling London.

In 2015 the Bristol store was ram raided for a second time.

In 2016, Garment Quarter won 'Bristol's Best Fashion Retailer' at the Bristol Lifestyle Awards thanks to a public vote. The award was presented by model Chloe-Jasmine.
