= The Face (British TV series) season 1 =

The Face
- Season 1
- Promotional poster
- No. of episodes: 8

Release
- Original network: Sky Living
- Original release: 30 September – 18 November 2013

The Face Season 1 is the first season of a British reality television modeling competition series, based upon the American version with the same format. This series follows three supermodel coaches, Caroline Winberg, Erin O'Connor, and Naomi Campbell as they compete with each other to find 'the face' of Max Factor, one of the leading cosmetics brands in the United Kingdom. The series premiered on 30 September 2013, on Sky Living.

== Casting ==
Aspiring contestants for the show had to pre-register themselves online and were encouraged to attend open casting calls or send in a video and application. The show required all contestants to be 18 years old and over at the time of auditioning in order to be eligible for the program. Contestants from any country around the world could apply, as long as they had all the required documentation in order to remain in the United Kingdom for the duration of the series. Those with experience as a model must not have been in any national campaign within the last five years.

== Contestants ==
(ages stated are at start of filming)

Contestant	Age	Height	Hometown	Model coach	Finish	Rank
Jessica Martin	24	1.70 m (5 ft 7 in)	London	Naomi	Episode 2	12
Natalie Ward	18	1.74 m (5 ft 8 1/2 in)	Bournemouth	Erin	Episode 3	11
Chloe-Jasmine Whichello	23	1.74 m (5 ft 8 1/2 in)	London	Naomi	Episode 4	10
Brooke Theis	19	1.80 m (5 ft 11 in)	Haslemere	Caroline	Episode 5	9
Nina Strauss	20	1.75 m (5 ft 9 in)	Stockholm, Sweden	Caroline	Episode 6	8
Nina Sethi	23	1.84 m (6 ft 1/2 in)	Lytham St Annes	Erin	Episode 7	7
Sienna King	19	1.79 m (5 ft 10 1/2 in)	London	Erin	Episode 7	6–5
Racquel Smith	22	1.80 m (5 ft 11 in)	Kingston, Jamaica	Naomi	Episode 7	6–5
Nadine Mendes	20	1.80 m (5 ft 11 in)	London	Caroline	Episode 8	4
Eleanor Corcoran	20	1.74 m (5 ft 8 1/2 in)	Brentwood	Caroline	Episode 8	3–2
Elaine Nturo	20	1.76 m (5 ft 9 1/2 in)	Bolton	Erin	Episode 8	3–2
Emma Holmes	18	1.80 m (5 ft 11 in)	Canterbury	Naomi	Episode 8	1

== Episodes ==
=== Episode 1: Week One ===
First aired 30 September 2013

Model mentors Caroline Winberg, Erin O'Connor, and Naomi Campbell size up the competition. After a series of challenges, the supermodels select the teams that they believe will lead them to victory. The winner of the competition will become the newest face of Max Factor.

=== Episode 2: Week Two ===
First aired 7 October 2013

The final twelve models move into their new loft, and the girls are later tested in a posing challenge overseen by Naomi Campbell. For the final hurdle, they must pose with their teammates in a shoot photographed by Ellen von Unwerth for i-D magazine. The losing teams must each send one of their members up for elimination, and after one of her models is eliminated from the competition, one of the coaches promises that she will get even.

- Challenge winner: Natalie Ward
- Winning coach and team: Caroline Winberg
- Bottom two: Jessica Martin & Elaine Nturo
- Eliminated: Jessica Martin

=== Episode 3: Week Three ===
First aired 14 October 2013

The mentors put their models to the test with a catwalk challenge in which they must wear strange and outlandish headpieces. One model is reprimanded due to her overly theatrical performance. Later that week, each team battles to win the campaign that will keep them out of the elimination room: a runway show for TheOutnet.com. The mentors of the losing teams must once again nominate one of their members to be eliminated, and another hopeful is axed from the competition.

- Challenge winner: Nadine Mendes
- Winning coach and team: Caroline Winberg
- Bottom two: Chloe Jasmine & Natalie Ward
- Eliminated: Natalie Ward

=== Episode 4: Week Four ===
First aired 21 October 2013

For the master class, the models are challenged to deliver dynamic poses whilst jumping in the air. Each team must once again fight to ensure safety for all of their members in a Marks & Spencer shoot in lingerie. Guest judge Rosie Huntington-Whiteley decides who the winner of the campaign will be. After elimination, one of the mentors lashes out at her models for having allowed their bickering to cost them a team member.

- Challenge winner: Chloe Jasmine
- Winning coach and team: Caroline Winberg
- Bottom two: Chloe Jasmine & Nina Sethi
- Eliminated: Chloe Jasmine

=== Episode 5: Week Five ===
First aired 28 October 2013

Erin O'Connor puts each girl's acting skills to the test during the master class. For the campaign, each mentor must style the girls in an advert for luxury car brand Maserati. Team Caroline's winning streak is finally broken by team Naomi after Emma and Racquel manage to set aside their differences to regain their team morale. During elimination, Caroline and Erin must leave the fate of one of their models in the hands of Naomi Campbell.

- Winning coach and team: Naomi Campbell
- Bottom two: Brooke Theis & Elaine Nturo
- Eliminated: Brooke Theis

=== Episode 6: Week Six ===
First aired 4 November 2013

The remaining models are challenged to put together an outfit in four minutes. The campaign requires them to take part in an interview conducted by Gordon Smart, journalist and editor of The Sun's celebrity column Bizarre. They are later sent to Harvey Nichols in London where they must choose outfits to wear at a red carpet event. The winner of the task is chosen by the interviewers based on their ability to answer tricky questions.

- Challenge winner: Elaine Nturo
- Winning coach and team: Naomi Campbell
- Bottom two: Nina Strauss & Nina Sethi
- Eliminated: Nina Strauss

=== Episode 7: Week Seven ===
First aired 11 November 2013

It's off to France as the competition makes its way to Paris for a Longchamp campaign, where one of the hopefuls is sent home sooner than expected. After the campaign, one of the models secures her safety for another week. Back in Britain, all three of the mentors must each choose one girl who will move on to the finale.

- Winning campaign: Nadine Mendes
- Winning coach and team: Caroline Winberg
- Bottom four: Emma Holmes, Elaine Nturo, Racquel Smith & Sienna King
- Eliminated: Racquel Smith & Sienna King
- Eliminated outside of the elimination room: Nina Sethi

=== Episode 8: Week Eight ===
First aired 18 November 2013

- Winning coach and team: Naomi Campbell
- Runner-up: Eleanor Corcoran & Elaine Nturo
- Eliminated: Nadine Mendes
- The Face UK: Emma Holmes

== Summaries ==
=== Elimination table ===
Team Caroline	Team Erin	Team Naomi

Place	Contestant	Episodes								
Place	Contestant	1	2	3	4	5	6	7	8	
1	Emma	IN	IN	IN	IN	WIN	WIN	LOW	IN	WINNER
2-3	Eleanor	IN	WIN	WIN	WIN	IN	IN	LOW	IN	RUNNER-UP
2-3	Elaine	IN	LOW	IN	IN	LOW	IN	LOW	IN	RUNNER-UP
4	Nadine	IN	WIN	WIN	WIN	IN	IN	WIN	OUT	
5-6	Racquel	IN	IN	IN	IN	WIN	WIN	OUT		
5-6	Sienna	IN	IN	IN	IN	IN	IN	OUT		
7	Nina Se.	IN	IN	IN	LOW	IN	LOW	OUT		
8	Nina St.	IN	WIN	WIN	WIN	IN	OUT			
9	Brooke	IN	WIN	WIN	WIN	OUT				
10	Chloe	IN	IN	LOW	OUT					
11	Natalie	IN	IN	OUT						
12	Jessica	IN	OUT							

The contestant was part of the winning team for the episode.
The contestant was at risk of elimination.
The contestant was eliminated from the competition.
The contestant was eliminated outside of the elimination room.
The contestant won the campaign individually.
The contestant was a Runner-Up.
The contestant won The Face.

- Episode 1 was the casting episode. The final twelve were divided into individual teams of four as they were selected.
- In episode 7, Nina Sethi was eliminated outside of the elimination room after having performed the worst in a challenge. The other six models all remained safe.
  - Nadine won the campaign individually, automatically advancing into the finale. Caroline, Erin, and Naomi were allowed to choose any one contestant to advance into the finale from the remaining five models. Caroline chose Eleanor, Erin chose Elaine, and Naomi chose Emma.
- In episode 8, Emma, Eleanor, and Elaine were put through to the final runway show while Nadine was eliminated.

=== Campaigns ===
- Episode 1: Natural Beauty Shots; Self Administered 'Transformations' (Casting)
- Episode 2: i-D Magazine Party Girls In Groups
- Episode 3: Revolving Runway Show for TheOutnet.com
- Episode 4: Marks & Spencer Lingerie in Teams
- Episode 5: Futuristic Maserati Adverts
- Episode 6: Glamour Women of the Year Awards on the Red Carpet
- Episode 7: Longchamp Campaign in Paris
- Episode 8: Max Factor Beauty Shots & Commercials
