= Andrea Faustini =

Italian singer

- Born: 17 June 1994 (age 32); Rome, Italy
- Genres: Pop; gospel; soul; R&B
- Occupation: Singer
- Years active: 2009–present
- Label: RCA Records

Andrea Faustini (born 17 June 1994) is an Italian singer. He is best known for his role as a contestant on the eleventh series of The X Factor in 2014 been the last contestant eliminated. In 2015, Faustini released his debut studio album, Kelly, which peaked at number 14 on the UK Albums Chart.

== Career ==
=== 2008: Ti lascio una canzone ===
In 2008, at the age of 13, Faustini appeared on the Italian show Ti Lascio Una Canzone (Leaving You a Song).

=== 2012: First single ===
On January that year, Andrea published "Per me e per te" written by Mariella Nava. Produced by Cantieri Sonori. The song and music videoclip are released in Italian.

=== 2014: The X Factor ===
Faustini, who sang The Jackson 5's "Who's Lovin' You" for his first audition was well received by the four judges present that day. Simon Cowell even commented that Faustini "could be really special" in the competition, before receiving a "yes" from all four of the judges. Faustini was part of the 114 other acts who successfully got through the Arena Auditions at the SSE Arena in London that year. Together with other male contestants up to the ages of 25, he was later placed into the "Boys" category, mentored by Mel B. Faustini got through the "six-chair challenge" during bootcamp, replacing Hayden Leeman, who had initially been given a seat for his rendition of Joan Jett's "I Love Rock 'n' Roll". Faustini's performance of Whitney Houston's "I Didn't Know My Own Strength" during bootcamp moved judges Mel B and Cheryl Fernandez-Versini to tears as well as earned him praises from Louis Walsh and Cowell. For judges' houses, Mel B brought the "Boys" category to Cancún where Faustini performed Jennifer Hudson's "And I Am Telling You I'm Not Going" for her and fellow Spice Girls member Emma Bunton. Faustini was one of the four finalists selected to perform at the live shows which began on 11 October 2014.

Faustini performed Michael Jackson's "Earth Song" for the first live show, and quickly became the bookies' favourite to win the show. He was in the bottom two in week 7 with Stevi Ritchie and was saved after Mel B, Fernandez-Versini and Walsh voted to send Faustini through to the quarter-final and Cowell voted to send Ritchie through to the quarter-final. However voting statistics revealed that Ritchie received more votes than Faustini meaning if Walsh sent the result to deadlock, Ritchie would've advanced to the quarter-final. Faustini was once again in the Final Showdown in the semi-final with Lauren Platt, but was saved again when Mel B, Walsh and Cowell voted to send Faustini through to the final with only Fernandez-Versini voting to send Platt through to the final. However, once again, voting statistics revealed that Faustini received the fewest public votes meaning if there was not a Final Showdown, or if Cowell had sent the result to deadlock, Platt would've advanced to the final. Faustini ended up being the last contestant eliminated, behind runner-up Fleur East and winner Ben Haenow.

The X Factor performances and results (2014)
Stage	Song	Theme	Result
Room audition	"Who's Lovin' You"	Free choice	Through to arena
Arena audition	"Try a Little Tenderness"	Free choice	Through to bootcamp
Six Chair Challenge (Bootcamp)	"I Didn't Know My Own Strength"	Free choice	Through to Judges' houses
Judges' houses	"And I Am Telling You"	Free choice	Through to Live Shows
Live week 1	"Earth Song"	Number ones	Safe (1st)
Live week 2	"One Moment in Time"	80's Night	Safe (1st)
Live week 3	"Listen"	Saturday Night at the Movies	Safe (1st)
Live week 4	"Relight My Fire"	Fright Night (Halloween)	Safe (2nd)
Live week 5	"Somebody to Love"	Michael Jackson vs. Queen	Safe (2nd)
Live week 6	"Summertime"	Big Band	Safe (4th)
Live week 7	"I Have Nothing"	Whitney Houston vs. Elton John	Bottom two (6th)
Live week 7	"Stop!"	Free choice	Safe (3/4 majority vote)
Quarter-Final	"Chandelier"	Song chosen by Sam Smith	Safe (2nd)
Quarter-Final	"Hero"	Song chosen by the public	Safe (2nd)
Semi-Final	"O Holy Night"	Christmas Songs	Bottom two (4th)
Semi-Final	"Wrecking Ball"	Song to take you to the final	Bottom two (4th)
Semi-Final	"Who You Are"	Free choice	Safe (3/4 majority vote)
Final	"Feeling Good"	Free choice	Third Place (22.2%)
Final	"Ghost"	Celebrity Duet (with Ella Henderson)	Third Place (22.2%)

=== 2015: Kelly ===
22 February 2015 it was announced that Faustini had signed a record deal with RCA Records and would be going to Los Angeles and Tamworth to record his debut album at Ventura Park Matatlan, due for release later in 2015 His debut album Kelly was released on 17 July 2015.

==== Mister Felicitá ====
Andrea takes part in the original soundtrack written by Umberto Gary Scipione (music and lyrics), singing the two original songs, "Our nights" and "Rhapsody", for the Italian film "Mister Felicità".

== Discography ==
=== Albums ===
Title	Album details	Peak chart positions		
Title	Album details	UK	SCO	IRE
Kelly	Released: 17 July 2015; Labels: RCA Records; Formats: Digital download, CD	14	29	89

=== Singles ===
Title	Year	Peak chart positions				Album
Title	Year	IT	UK	SCO	IRE	Album
"Per Me e Per Te"	2012	—	—	—	—	Non-album single
"Give a Little Love"	2015	—	—	—	—	Kelly

=== Soundtracks ===
- "Our nights" for Mister Felicità (2017)
- "Rhapsody" for the film Mister Felicità (2017)

=== Music videoclips ===
- Per me e per te
- Give a little love
