= James Hill (TV personality) =

English television personality (born 1987)

- Born: Anthony James Hill; 14 May 1987 (age 39); Chesterfield, Derbyshire, England
- Years active: 2014–2019
- Television: The Apprentice (2014); Celebrity Big Brother 16 (2015) Celebrity Dinner Date (2017) Celebrity Coach Trip (2019)
- Partner(s): Naomi Hibbert (2016–present; engaged)
- Children: 2

James Hill (born 14 May 1987) is an English entrepreneur and former television personality. Hill made his first television appearance in 2014 after taking part in the tenth series of The Apprentice in 2014. The following year, he took part in the sixteenth series of Celebrity Big Brother, which he won.

== Life and career ==
Anthony James Hill was born 14 May 1987, in Chesterfield, Derbyshire, England. According to Hill, his first entrepreneurial venture was when he was 13 years old, selling chocolate bars to his school classmates to make extra money for dinner.

In October 2014, Hill competed as a candidate on the tenth series of BBC One's The Apprentice, getting eliminated in ninth task. Shortly after the series premiered, it was reported that in 2009, Hill was arrested for two different assaults in 2008; one for attacking a man who talked to his then-girlfriend, and the other for biting a man's ear on Christmas Eve. He received a six month jail sentence suspended for 18 months, and also ordered to pay £500 to victims and £755 in costs. After the series, it was revealed that he had been in a relationship with fellow candidate Lauren Riley during the filming of the programme.

On 27 August 2015, Hill entered the Celebrity Big Brother house for its sixteenth series. After 29 days, on 24 September, Hill was announced as the winner, receiving 45.16% of the public vote to win. James has also starred in Celebrity Dinner Dates in 2017. In 2018 he starred in Five Star Hotel.

== Filmography ==
Year	Show	Note
2014	The Apprentice	Contestant (series 10)
2015	Celebrity Big Brother	Housemate (series 16)
2017	Celebrity Dinner Date	Series 7, Episode 1
2018	Five Star Hotel	2 episodes
2018	Pointless Celebrities	Series 11, Episode 19
2019	Celebrity Coach Trip	Series 5 Contestant; Runner-up

Preceded by Katie Price	Celebrity Big Brother UK winner Series 16 (2015)	Succeeded by Scotty T
