= Stevi Ritchie =

English singer and television personality (born 1980)

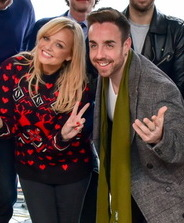
- Ritchie with Emma Bunton in 2014

Background information
- Born: Steven Andrew Ritchie; 17 September 1980 (age 46); Colchester, Essex, England
- Occupations: Singer, Actor
- Years active: 2014–present

Steven Andrew Ritchie (born 17 September 1980) is an English singer, reality television star and actor known for his appearances on The X Factor and Celebrity Big Brother.

== Career ==
=== 2014: The X Factor ===
In 2014, Ritchie auditioned for eleventh series of The X Factor, singing "Dance with Me Tonight". Mentored by Simon Cowell, he was not initially selected for the live shows, but Cheryl Fernandez-Versini chose him to be the Over 26s wildcard. After the eliminations of Overload Generation in week 1 and Jack Walton and Lola Saunders in week 4, Ritchie was the last wildcard contestant left in the competition. In week 6, Ritchie was in the bottom two with fellow Over 26s contestant Jay James. Cowell and Louis Walsh voted to save James, but Mel B and Fernandez-Versini who chose him as a wildcard contestant and had the casting vote, voted to save Ritchie. This meant Fernandez-Versini sent the vote to deadlock and James was sent home. The following week, he was in the bottom two again with Andrea Faustini and was eliminated by the judges with only Cowell voting to send Ritchie through to the quarter-final, and Mel B, Fernandez-Versini and Walsh voting to send Faustini through to the quarter-final, and he was eliminated. However, voting statistics revealed that Ritchie received more votes than Faustini which meant that if Walsh sent the result to deadlock, Ritchie would have advanced to the quarter-final and Faustini would have been eliminated.

He was however brought back for multiple guest star performances

==== Performances during the show ====
The X Factor performances and results (2014)
Stage	Song	Theme	Result
Room audition	"Dance with Me Tonight - Olly Murs"	Free choice	Through to arena
Arena audition	"Don't Stop Me Now - Queen"	Free choice	Through to bootcamp
Six-chair challenge (bootcamp)	"The Time of My Life"	Free choice	Through to judges' houses
Judges'houses	"I'm a Believer - The Monkees"	Free choice	Eliminated but brought back as a wildcard by Cheryl Fernandez-Versini
Live week 1	"Livin' la Vida Loca"	Number ones	Safe (10th)
Live week 2	"Never Gonna Give You Up"	80's night	Safe (8th)
Live week 3	"Footloose"	Saturday night at the movies	Safe (7th)
Live week 4	"The Music of the Night"	Fright night (Halloween)	Safe (3rd)
Live week 5	"Bohemian Rhapsody"	Michael Jackson vs. Queen	Safe (6th)
Live week 6	"She Bangs" / "Mambo No. 5"	Big band	Bottom two (7th)
Live week 6	"Somebody to Love"	Free choice	Safe (Deadlock)
Live week 7	"I'm Still Standing"	Whitney Houston vs. Elton John	Bottom two (5th)
Live week 7	"This Is the Moment"	Free choice	Eliminated (sixth place)

=== 2015: Celebrity Big Brother ===
Ritchie participated in the sixteenth series of Celebrity Big Brother with fiancé, Chloe Jasmine Whichello. On 24 September, they reached the final on Day 29 and placed 5th.

=== Other appearances ===
In August 2015, Ritchie and Whichello appeared in an episode of Keep It in the Family. He also appeared in a celebrity edition of Channel 4 game show Benchmark in October 2015. He has made appearances on Good Morning Britain, Lorraine, This Morning and Loose Women. He has also taken part in the CBBC game show Ultimate Brain. On 15 August 2016 Essex County Standard reported that Essex TV had commissioned a show hosted by Ritchie dubbed 'Stevi Ritchie Takes On Essex.'

On Saturday 4 November 2017 Stevi performed alongside Britain's Got Talent star Paul Manners at Bridgwater Carnival.

In 2023 he became a calling host at Mecca Bingo Luton

== Personal life ==
Ritchie and fellow contestant Chloe Jasmine Whichello began dating during their participation on The X Factor, Ritchie has a daughter, Summer, from a previous relationship.

In 2007, Ritchie trained as professional wrestler, having a few professional matches using the name "Steve Straight".
