= Kelly (Andrea Faustini album) =

Studio album by Andrea Faustini
- Released: 17 July 2015
- Recorded: 2015; Los Angeles
- Label: Syco Music, RCA, Sony Music
- Producer: Graham Stack, Matt Furmidge

Kelly is the debut studio album by Italian singer Andrea Faustini. It was preceded by release of the single "Give a Little Love", the video for which premiered on 17 July 2015. Kelly debuted and peaked at number 14 on the UK Albums Chart.

== Background ==
Regarding the album, Faustini said: "I'm such a positive person, and I like to smile even in tough times. This is what life is about for me - be kind to the people you love (and the people you don't), and always smile... In other words, give a little love!"

Lead single "Give a Little Love" received its debut airplay on BBC Radio 2 on 2 June 2015.

One of the songs on the album, "What Would Dusty Do", was co-written by The Voice UK finalist Vince Kidd.

== Track listing ==
Note: All tracks produced by Graham Stack and Matt Furmidge.

Kelly
No.	Title	Writer(s)	Length
1.	"It'll All End in Tears"	Jonathan Green; Phil Thornalley; Rebecca Hill	3:03
2.	"Evaporate"	George Tizzard; Karl Michael; Rick Parkhouse; Robbie McDade	3:30
3.	"The River"	Emma Rohan; Jez Ashurst; Martin Sjølie	3:26
4.	"Kelly"	Bryn Christopher; Matt Prime; Tim Woodcock	3:28
5.	"You Pulled Me Through"	Diane Warren	3:50
6.	"Back to the Sea"	David Gibson; Tre Jean-Marie	3:29
7.	"Give a Little Love"	Andrea Faustini; Camille Purcell; Lee McCutcheon	3:13
8.	"What Would Dusty Do"	Jonny Wright; Matthew Protheroe	3:46
9.	"Lascia Tutto Cosi"	Elisa Toffoli	3:53
10.	"I Didn't Know My Own Strength"	Warren	3:21

== Charts ==
Chart (2015)	Peak position
Scottish Albums (OCC)	29
UK Albums (OCC)	14
