= Austin Armacost =

American reality television personality

- Born: March 28, 1988 (age 37); Muncie, Indiana, U.S.
- Citizenship: United States; United Kingdom
- Occupations: Television personality; model
- Years active: 2010–2017
- Television: The A-List: New York; Celebrity Big Brother
- Spouse: Jake Lees (m. 2010; div. 2016)
- Partner(s): Marc Jacobs (2008); Darren Banks (2016–present)

Austin C. Armacost (born March 28, 1988) is a former American television personality and model known for his appearances on the American Logo reality television series The A-List: New York (2010–11), and the British Channel 5 reality series Celebrity Big Brother (2015; 2017).

== Early life ==
Armacost was born on March 28, 1988, in Muncie, Indiana, and raised in Franklin, Indiana, a suburb of Indianapolis. In his youth, Armacost discovered he was homosexual: "I knew very young I was gay, but I didn't really face any type of negativity or discrimination growing up." He officially came out at 14. He had one older brother, Tyler Armacost (1985–2013), who he described as 'supportive'. Armacost would attend Lawrence Central High School in Indianapolis, where he competed in track and pole vaulting.

== Career ==
At age 16, Armacost sought a career as a model in high school, traveling to Chicago from Indianapolis two to three times a month. He eventually moved to Chicago a day after graduating high school to pursue his career.

In 2010, Armacost was cast on the Logo LGBT reality series, The A-List: New York, after seeing a casting for a show. The series followed Armacost, as well as five other gay and bisexual men living in New York City. He would appear in the shows' two seasons before its cancellation in June 2012.

On 27 August 2015, Armacost entered the Celebrity Big Brother house as a housemate in the sixteenth series competing for "Team USA". On 24 September, Armacost was deemed the runner up, losing out to James Hill. Following their appearance in the series, both Armacost and Hill were awarded the "TV Moment of the Year" at the 2015 Attitude Awards. In 2017, Armacost returned to Celebrity Big Brother for the All-Star nineteenth series. He was evicted in a series twist where fellow housemates voted him as the "dullest housemate"; finishing fifteenth overall.

== Personal life ==
Armacost briefly dated fashion designer Marc Jacobs in March 2008. In the fall of 2008, Armacost met Jake Lees, who was on an international internship originally from London. While filming The A-List: New York in July 2010, Armacost traveled to England to get legally married. Armacost announced their separation in July 2016; the divorce was finalized later that year.

Armacost has been dating business architect, Darren Banks, since October 2016. They primarily reside in the United Kingdom.

== Television appearances ==
Year	Title	Role	Notes
2010–11	The A-List: New York	Himself	Main cast
2015, 2017	Celebrity Big Brother	Himself	Series 16: Runner-up; Series 19: 15th place
2015	Big Brother's Bit on the Side	Himself	Panelist; 3 episodes

== See also ==
- LGBT culture in New York City
