= The Face (British TV series) =

- Genre: Reality
- Judges: Caroline Winberg; Erin O'Connor; Naomi Campbell
- Narrated by: Simon Lenagan
- Country of origin: United Kingdom
- Original language: English
- No. of series: 1
- No. of episodes: 8

Production
- Executive producer: Alf Lawrie
- Running time: 60 minutes (inc. adverts)
- Production companies: Princess Productions and Shine TV

Original release
- Network: Sky Living
- Release: 30 September – 18 November 2013

Related
- The Face

The Face is a British reality television series based on the American series of the same name. It aired on Sky Living from September to November 2013. The series saw three supermodels – Caroline Winberg, Erin O'Connor and Naomi Campbell - compete with each other to find the newest face of Max Factor.

The premiere of The Face drew poor ratings of only 132,000 viewers, a market share of 0.6% of British households watching TV at the time, and below the audience Sky Living averaged in the same time slot - 239,000 viewers (1% share) - during the year before the show aired. In July 2014, it was confirmed that due to poor ratings, the show was axed and would not return for a second series.

== Seasons ==
Seasons	Premiere date	Winner	Runners-up	Other contestants in order of elimination	Number of contestants	International destination
1	30 September 2013	Emma Holmes	Eleanor Corcoran; Elaine Nturo	Jessica Martin, Natalie Ward, Chloe-Jasmine Whichello, Brooke Theis, Nina Strauss, Nina Sethi, Sienna King, Racquel Smith, Nadine Mendes	12	Paris; France

Mentor's color symbols

Team Caroline
Team Erin
Team Naomi
