= The Apprentice (British TV series) series 10 =

Tenth season of UK television series

The Apprentice
- Series 10
- Promo group shot of Alan Sugar, Nick Hewer and Karren Brady standing before the candidates for series 10
- Starring: Alan Sugar; Nick Hewer; Karren Brady
- No. of episodes: 14

Release
- Original network: BBC One
- Original release: 14 October – 21 December 2014

Series chronology
- ← Previous; Series 9 Next → Series 11

The tenth series of British reality television series The Apprentice was broadcast in the UK on BBC One from 14 October to 21 December 2014. Due to live coverage in summer of that year for both the FIFA World Cup and the Commonwealth Games in Glasgow, the BBC postponed the series' broadcast until autumn to avoid schedule clashing. It is the last series to feature Nick Hewer as Alan Sugar's aide, who left the programme following the series finale. Ricky Martin, winner of the eighth series, appears as an interviewer in the Interviews Stage.

Alongside the standard twelve episodes, with the first two airing on consecutive days, the series featured two specials before its premiere – "Meet the Candidates", made available online only on 7 October; and "Ten Years of The Apprentice" on 13 October. Later in the series, two further specials also aired – "The Final Five" on 16 December; and "Why I Fired Them" on 18 December.

This series featured twenty candidates, the highest number of any variation of The Apprentice globally, with Mark Wright becoming the overall winner. Excluding specials, the series averaged around 7.40 million viewers during its broadcast.

== Series overview ==
Applications for the tenth series opened in Spring 2013, towards the end of the ninth series' broadcast, with the selection process of auditions, assessments and interviews held during the summer of that year. As The Apprentice was now entering its tenth year, the anniversary was commemorated in subtle ways throughout the programme - the first sales task and the subsequent bargain-hunting task featured items from previous series' challenges. The decision to increase the number of candidates allowed Sugar to perform more multiple firings than before, allowing for the series to include a triple firing outside of the Interviews stage, for the first time in the series' history.

During filming, Nick Hewer began to contemplate his future on the programme, after finding the filming schedule tiring and intense. After considering his other commitments, including his new role as host of Channel 4's Countdown, he eventually decided that the tenth series would be his last on The Apprentice, revealing his decision towards the end of the tenth series' broadcast, with it fully confirmed by Sugar on social media and the series finale of You're Fired. Apart from Hewer, Margaret Mountford also decided not to return in her role as an interviewer, a post she had held for the previous four series; she was replaced by series eight winner, Ricky Martin.

Owing to the live coverage of two major sporting events in 2014 – the FIFA World Cup and the Commonwealth Games in Glasgow, the BBC was forced to broadcast the series in the autumn, to avoid schedule clashes. The series premiere was preceded by a special, entitled "Ten Years of The Apprentice", a retrospective on the past nine series. In addition, this series featured the online exclusive mini episode, "Meet the Candidates", which introduced the series' candidates and even showed their audition tapes; it was hosted by comedian Matt Edmondson.

The team names for this series were Summit and Tenacity. Of those who took part, Mark Wright would become the eventual winner, going on to use his prize to start up an SEO business called Climb Online.

=== Candidates ===
Candidate	Background	Age	Result
Mark Wright	Sales Manager – Digital Marketing	24	Winner
Bianca Miller	Owner – Personal Branding Company	25	Runner-up
Daniel Lassman	Director – Pub Quiz Company	27	Fired after Interviews stage
Roisin Hogan	Accountant	32	Fired after Interviews stage
Solomon Akhtar	Technology Entrepreneur	22	Fired after Interviews stage
Sanjay Sood-Smith	Senior Manager – Banking	27	Fired after tenth task
Katie Bulmer-Cooke	Fitness Entrepreneur	27	Fired after tenth task
Felipe Alviar-Baquero	Lawyer	33	Fired after ninth task
James Hill	Multiple Business Owner	26	Fired after eighth task
Lauren Riley	Solicitor	28	Fired after seventh task
Pamela Uddin	Assistant Brand Manager	23	Fired after sixth task
Jemma Bird	Operations Manager	26	Fired after fifth task
Ella Jade Bitton	Business Management Graduate	23	Fired after fourth task
Sarah Dales	Former PA and Hypnotherapist	32	Fired after fourth task
Steven Ugoalah	Social Worker	29	Fired after fourth task
Nurun Ahmed	Marketing Officer and Fashion Retailer	36	Fired after third task
Lindsay Booth	Owner – Swimming Academy	29	Fired after third task
Scott McCulloch	Clinical Development Strategist	24	Fired after second task
Robert Goodwin	Marketing Manager	25	Fired after second task
Chiles Cartwright	Company Director	35	Fired after first task

=== Performance chart ===
Candidate	Task Number											
Candidate	1	2	3	4	5	6	7	8	9	10	11	12
Mark	LOSS	LOSS	LOSS	IN	IN	LOSS	LOSE	IN	LOSS	BR	IN	HIRED
Bianca	IN	IN	LOSS	IN	BR	IN	WIN	LOSS	IN	IN	IN	RUNNER-UP
Daniel	LOSS	BR	IN	LOSS	WIN	BR	BR	IN	LOSE	IN	FIRED	
Roisin	IN	IN	LOSE	IN	LOSS	IN	IN	BR	IN	WIN	FIRED	
Solomon	LOSS	BR	LOSS	WIN	LOSS	IN	IN	LOSS	IN	IN	FIRED	
Sanjay	LOSS	LOSS	LOSS	IN	LOSE	IN	IN	BR	WIN	FIRED		
Katie	IN	IN	WIN	LOSS	IN	LOSS	LOSS	IN	BR	FIRED		
Felipe	LOSE	LOSS	IN	LOSS	IN	LOSS	LOSS	WIN	FIRED			
James	LOSS	LOSS	BR	IN	LOSS	WIN	IN	FIRED				
Lauren	IN	IN	IN	LOSS	IN	BR	FIRED					
Pamela	IN	IN	IN	LOSS	IN	FIRED						
Jemma	IN	IN	IN	IN	FIRED							
Ella Jade	IN	IN	IN	FIRED								
Sarah	WIN	IN	IN	FIRED								
Steven	LOSS	LOSS	IN	FIRED								
Nurun	IN	WIN	FIRED									
Lindsay	IN	IN	FIRED									
Scott	LOSS	FIRED										
Robert	BR	FIRED										
Chiles	FIRED											

Key:

HIRED The candidate won this series of The Apprentice.
RUNNER-UP The candidate was the runner-up.
WIN The candidate won as project manager on his/her team, for this task.
LOSE The candidate lost as project manager on his/her team, for this task.
IN The candidate was on the winning team for this task / they passed the Interviews stage.
LOSS The candidate was on the losing team for this task.
BR The candidate was brought to the final boardroom for this task.
FIRED The candidate was fired in this task.
FIRED The candidate lost as project manager for this task and was fired.

== Episodes ==
No. overall	No. in series	Title	Original release date	UK viewers (millions)
127	1	"Ten Years of Selling"	14 October 2014	8.22
Lord Sugar begins his search for a business partner from a pool of twenty new candidates. For their first task, candidates must sell a selection of items handpicked from nine years of opening challenges. Both teams opt for the same strategy of branding the same item with a novel design, as well as making hot snacks. The women manage good sales, despite selling their branded product for less than potential value and dealing with a frustrating team leader. The men deliver a strong performance, but are hampered by time-wasting and poor sales tactics. The women secure victory, leaving the men to face the boardroom over their mistakes. Of the final three, Chiles Cartwright becomes the first to be fired for his lack of sales, mismanaging his sub-team, and for focusing on low-value items rather than more valuable commodities.
128	2	"Wearable Technology"	15 October 2014	7.50
Fashion with in-built technology is the basis of the next task, as each team must come up with a brand-new piece of wearable tech and pitch their concept to retailers. The men design a jumper with a built-in camera and LEDs, but secure no orders due to poor pitching, alongside negative feedback on their product's design. The women design a solar-powered jacket with a built-in phone charger and heat pads, managing to secure orders from one retailer, despite concerns over their design. Tenacity win, while Summit are criticised over their flawed product. On the losing team, Robert Goodwin is fired for refusing Lord Sugar's instructions to be the team's project manager, while Scott McCulloch, who actually did become the project manager, is also fired for his lack of leadership and presence.
129	3	"Home Fragrance"	22 October 2014	7.79
This week's task is to manufacture a brand-new range of fragrances to sell to passing trade and retailers around London. Summit create a range made with high-end ingredients and a beach-themed branding. Tenacity create a range made with cheap ingredients and British-themed branding, managing lucrative sales and controlling their costs, despite some customers being put off by the high price tag. Tenacity win, leaving Summit to face an in-depth review of their poor performance. On the losing team, Lindsay Booth leaves the process voluntarily after admitting to being out of her depth, while Lord Sugar fires Nurun Ahmed for her lack of assertiveness and sales.
130	4	"Online Video Channel"	29 October 2014	7.63
The teams are tasked with creating their own YouTube channel showcasing unique content, with the ability to secure additional views through the support of both a prominent Youtuber and a major website. Tenacity focus on fitness videos, but problematic members cause production errors, while their videos are deemed offensive, and their pitch to the website is poorly received. Summit focus on creating culinary comedy videos, securing good views through using a popular Youtuber's promotions, but fail to secure the website over concerns that their content is aimed at the wrong target audience. Summit secure victory, leaving Tenacity to face questions over the flaws in their performance. From the losing team, Lord Sugar fires three members for contributing to their loss – Steven Ugoalah, for presenting a poor pitch to the website and his volatile personality; Sarah Dales, for her weak performance in tasks; and Ella-Jade Bitton, for directing the videos poorly.
131	5	"Coach Tours"	5 November 2014	7.72
Teams are tasked with running their own luxury coach tour, complete with refreshments, with each team choosing two London attractions. Tenacity take their guests to Blenheim Palace and Oxford, managing their costs efficiently and receiving good customer feedback, despite criticism over the refreshments on offer and a weak tour of Oxford. Summit take their guests to Hever Castle and Canterbury, receiving good customer feedback on their refreshments, but were criticised for a poor tour of the first site, a group singalong on the coach, and for getting lost and thus having less time to tour Canterbury. Tenacity win the task, leaving Summit to face criticism. Of the final three, Jemma Bird is fired for her poorly-planned guided tour of the first venue, alongside her lack of contributions and presence in tasks.
132	6	"Board Game"	12 November 2014	7.80
Teams are tasked with creating their own board games, with each selling their creation to retailers around London. Summit create an educational geography board game, managing positive sales and receiving praise from retailers and their focus group on their concept. Tenacity create a dating board game and, despite making modest sales, their concept is criticised by their focus group and retailers over the sexist and offensive nature of its design. Summit win the task, leaving Tenacity to face questions over the flaws of their game. Of the final three, Pamela Uddin is fired for ignoring market research and for not bringing the team member responsible for their concept back into the boardroom.
133	7	"Advertising – New York"	19 November 2014	6.77
The teams are tasked with designing a brand new soft drink, heading to New York to create a promotional campaign, before pitching it to American industry experts. Summit create a fizzy drink that is praised for its taste and promotional campaign, despite the experts having issues with the brand's logo and their TV advert. Tenacity create a new health drink, but face criticism over a dull presentation, the drink's poor taste, and both the advertising and branding, despite receiving good feedback on their concept. Summit win the task, leaving Tenacity to face criticism over the flaws of their creation. On the losing team, Lauren Riley is fired for contributing to the team's poor pitch.
134	8	"Country Show"	26 November 2014	7.04
Heading to the Royal Bath and West Show, each team must select two new products and one surefire seller to sell at the event. Summit choose hanging chairs, folding Wellington boots and lawnmowers, but make poor sales due inefficient salesmanship. Tenacity sell hot tubs, bike trailers and handbags, achieving significant sales with the hot tubs, yet in-fighting between those selling the trailers and handbags impacts sales. Tenacity secure victory and, in the losing team, James Hill is fired for his poor leadership, as well as his immature and arrogant attitude.
135	9	"Ten Years of Discount Buying"	3 December 2014	6.66
Lord Sugar gives the teams a list of ten items to procure, each handpicked from previous series' bargain-hunting tasks. Summit's strategy is to source all the items before seeking out bargains and demonstrate good negotiations on some purchases, but are hampered by problematic members. Tenacity spend little time on sourcing items and use their best negotiators to secure good bargains, but two purchases are disallowed for not matching specifications. Summit achieve victory, as Tenacity face serious questions on their performance after their total spend is impacted by the fines they receive. Of the final three, Felipe Alviar-Baquero is fired for making the critical purchase that was disallowed, alongside demonstrating a lack of business skills and his overall track record.
136	10	"Premium Pudding"	10 December 2014	7.31
The teams are tasked with creating a brand-new premium pudding, complete with packaging, and pitch their creations to retailers. Tenacity create exotic trifles, but receive few orders from retailers due to criticism of their packaging, pitching and their product's unappetising taste. Summit create a line of tea-based cheesecakes, earning favourable orders thanks to good feedback on their creation and its flavour. Summit win and, in the losing team, Lord Sugar fires Katie Bulmer-Cooke for creating an unpopular flavour, while Sanjay Sood-Smith is fired over his poor contributions.
137	SP–1	"The Final Five"	16 December 2014	N/A
As the series finale draws closer, this special episode profiles the five remaining candidates. Discussing their backgrounds, experiences, personalities, and strengths and weaknesses, are candidates' friends, family and colleagues, as well as Lord Sugar's aides, Nick Hewer and Karren Brady.
138	11	"Interviews"	17 December 2014	7.17
After facing ten tasks as teams, the five remaining candidates now compete as individuals in their next task – a series of tough, gruelling interviews with four of Lord Sugar's most trusted associates, facing scrutiny over their backgrounds, work experience, track record, and business proposals. In the boardroom, Solomon Akhtar is fired for his vague and poor business proposal; Roisin Hogan is fired for concerns over the costs of her proposal; and Daniel Lassman is fired for questions over his business proposal and failure to demonstrate sales skills. Bianca Miller and Mark Wright receive praise from interviewers, and Lord Sugar deems their proposals very appealing.
139	SP–2	"Why I Fired Them"	18 December 2014	N/A
As the final looms, Lord Sugar takes a look back on the series so far. From making board games and selling soft drinks in New York, to operating coach tours and bargain hunting, he relives all of the mistakes, doomed decisions, and other notable events that occurred during the process, providing his reasons behind each firing.
140	12	"The Final"	21 December 2014	7.22
After facing a multitude of business tasks and a tough interview, the two finalists, aided by the fired candidates, present their business proposals to an audience of business and industry experts. Bianca pitches her plans for a tights and hosiery business, but faces questions over her lack of manufacturing experience and the product pricing and branding. Mark pitches his plans for a SEO business supporting small companies, receiving praise for his strong industry expertise and brand name, yet faces questions over his proposal's target market and staff costs. Based on feedback from these presentations, Lord Sugar crowns Mark Wright winner, for his strong business proposal, leaving Bianca Miller to finish as runner-up due to concerns raised about her proposal, as well as her leadership skills (despite having beaten Mark when they were opposing project managers in Week 7). Notes: This episode was originally broadcast as part of a two-hour crossover special with the programme's sister show, You're Fired. After the crossover special, this episode was broadcast separately in subsequent repeats.

== Ratings ==
Official episode viewing figures are from BARB.

Episode no.	Airdate	Viewers (millions)	BBC One weekly ranking
1	14 October 2014	8.22	3
2	15 October 2014	7.50	6
3	22 October 2014	7.79	5
4	29 October 2014	7.63	5
5	5 November 2014	7.72	4
6	12 November 2014	7.80	6
7	19 November 2014	6.77	8
8	26 November 2014	7.04	7
9	3 December 2014	6.66	9
10	10 December 2014	7.31	4
11	17 December 2014	7.17	7
12	21 December 2014	7.22	6

Note: During the 2-hour final, the show was shared with The Apprentice: You're Hired, and as a result the figures are lower than expected. The first hour was the main show whereas the second hour was You're Hired. Original overnights for the final put the first hour at one million viewers more than the 2-hour average.

Specials

Episode	Airdate	Viewers (millions)	BBC One weekly ranking
Ten Years of The Apprentice	13 October 2014	—N/a	—N/a
The Final Five	16 December 2014	—N/a	—N/a
Why I Fired Them	18 December 2014	—N/a	—N/a
