= The X Factor (British TV series) series 11 =

British TV competition

The X Factor
- Series 11
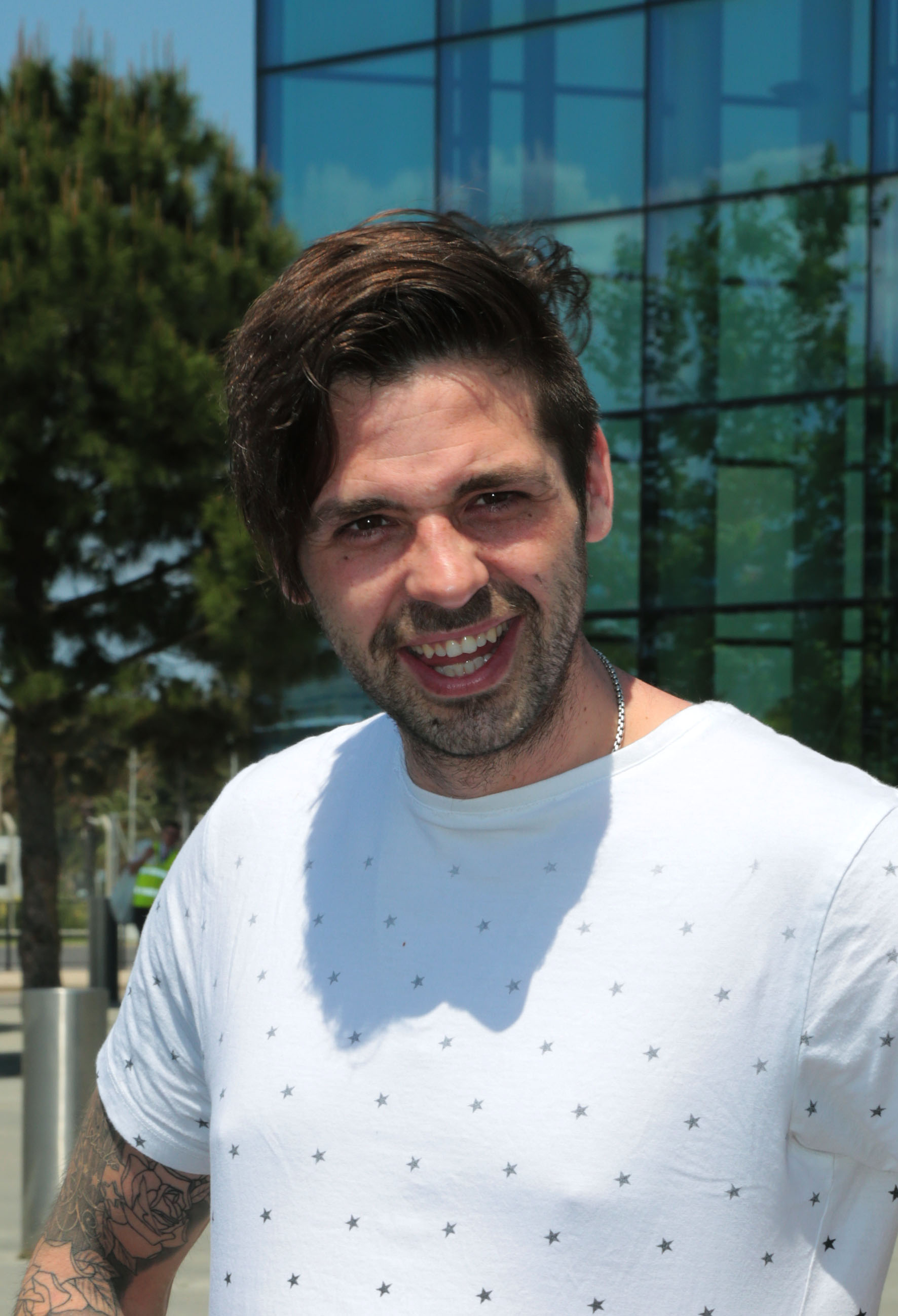
- Ben Haenow at a press conference in Gibraltar in 2016.
- Hosted by: Dermot O'Leary (ITV); Sarah-Jane Crawford (ITV2)
- Judges: Simon Cowell; Cheryl Fernandez-Versini; Mel B; Louis Walsh; Tulisa (guest)
- Winner: Ben Haenow
- Winning mentor: Simon Cowell
- Runner-up: Fleur East
- Finals venue: Fountain Studios (Live Shows) The SSE Arena, Wembley (Final)

Release
- Original network: ITV; ITV2 (The Xtra Factor)
- Original release: 30 August – 14 December 2014

Series chronology
- ← Previous; Series 10 Next → Series 12

The X Factor is a British television music competition to find new singing talent. The eleventh series began airing on ITV on 30 August 2014 and finished on 14 December 2014. Dermot O'Leary presented his eighth series of the main show on ITV and Sarah-Jane Crawford presented spin-off show The Xtra Factor on ITV2, replacing Caroline Flack and Matt Richardson. Louis Walsh was the only judge from series 10 to return and was joined by former judges Cheryl Fernandez-Versini, Simon Cowell, and new judge Mel B, who replaced Sharon Osbourne, Gary Barlow and Nicole Scherzinger. Former judge Tulisa returned as a guest judge for the final on 13 December due to Mel B being ill. The series also saw the lower age limit decreased from 16 to 14, as it was in series 4 and 5. This was Walsh's final series as a judge before returning in series 13. It was O'Leary's final series as presenter on the main show, as he announced on 27 March 2015 that he was leaving to pursue other projects, before returning in series 13. On 11 May, Crawford also confirmed via Twitter that she would leave her position as The Xtra Factor presenter.

Room auditions took place in Manchester, London, Newcastle and Edinburgh from 16 June to 1 July, followed by arena auditions in London, that were held between 1 and 4 August. Bootcamp was held in London in August and judges' houses around Nice, Los Angeles, Bermuda and Cancún in September. The live shows began on 11 October. Fernandez-Versini mentored the Girls, Mel B mentored the Boys, Walsh mentored the Groups and Cowell mentored the Over 26s. Ben Haenow won the series against Fleur East on 14 December 2014 with 57.2% of the votes.

== Judges, Presenters and Other Personnel ==
Judges and Presenter(s) for The X Factor Series 11

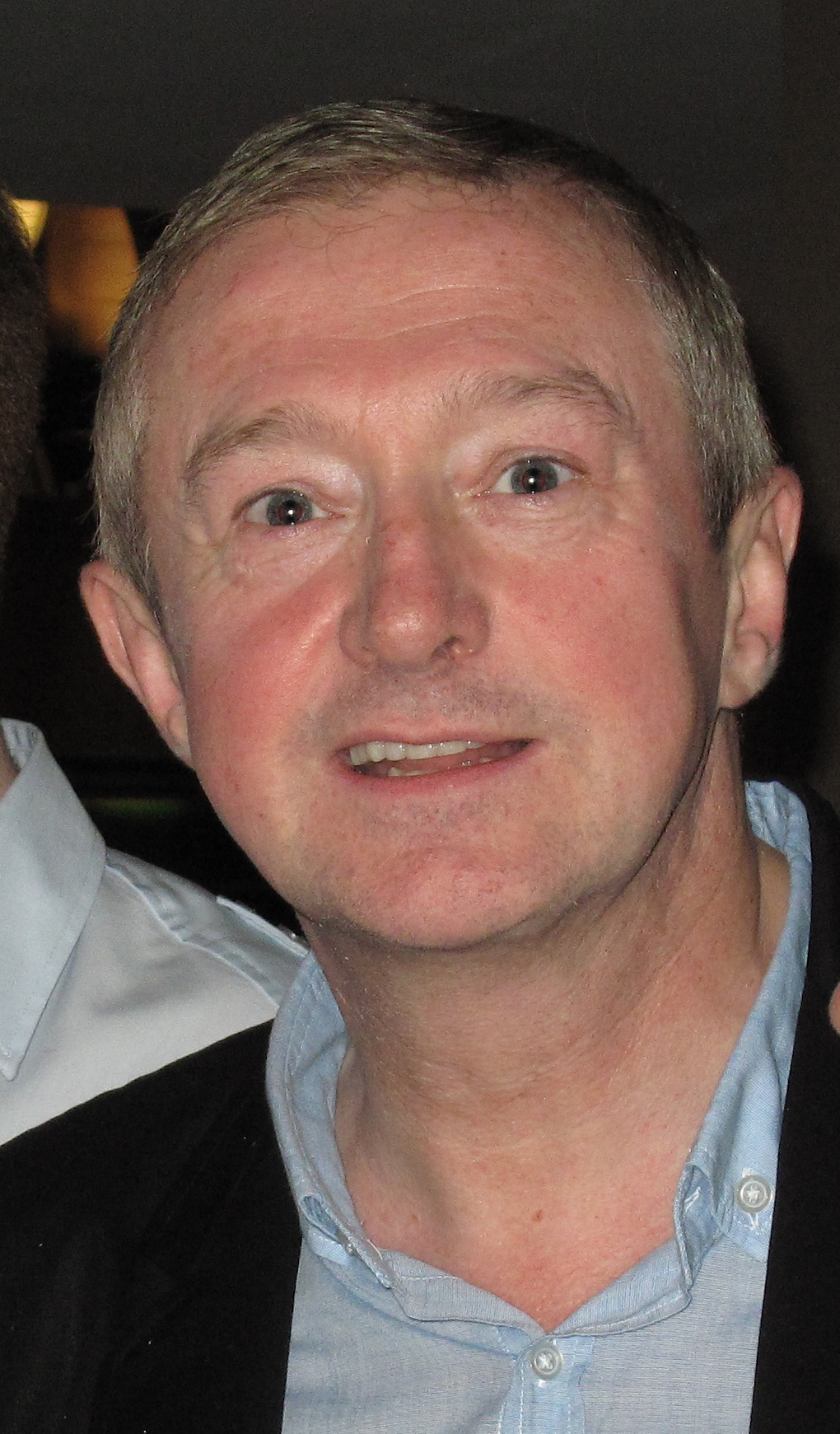
Louis Walsh

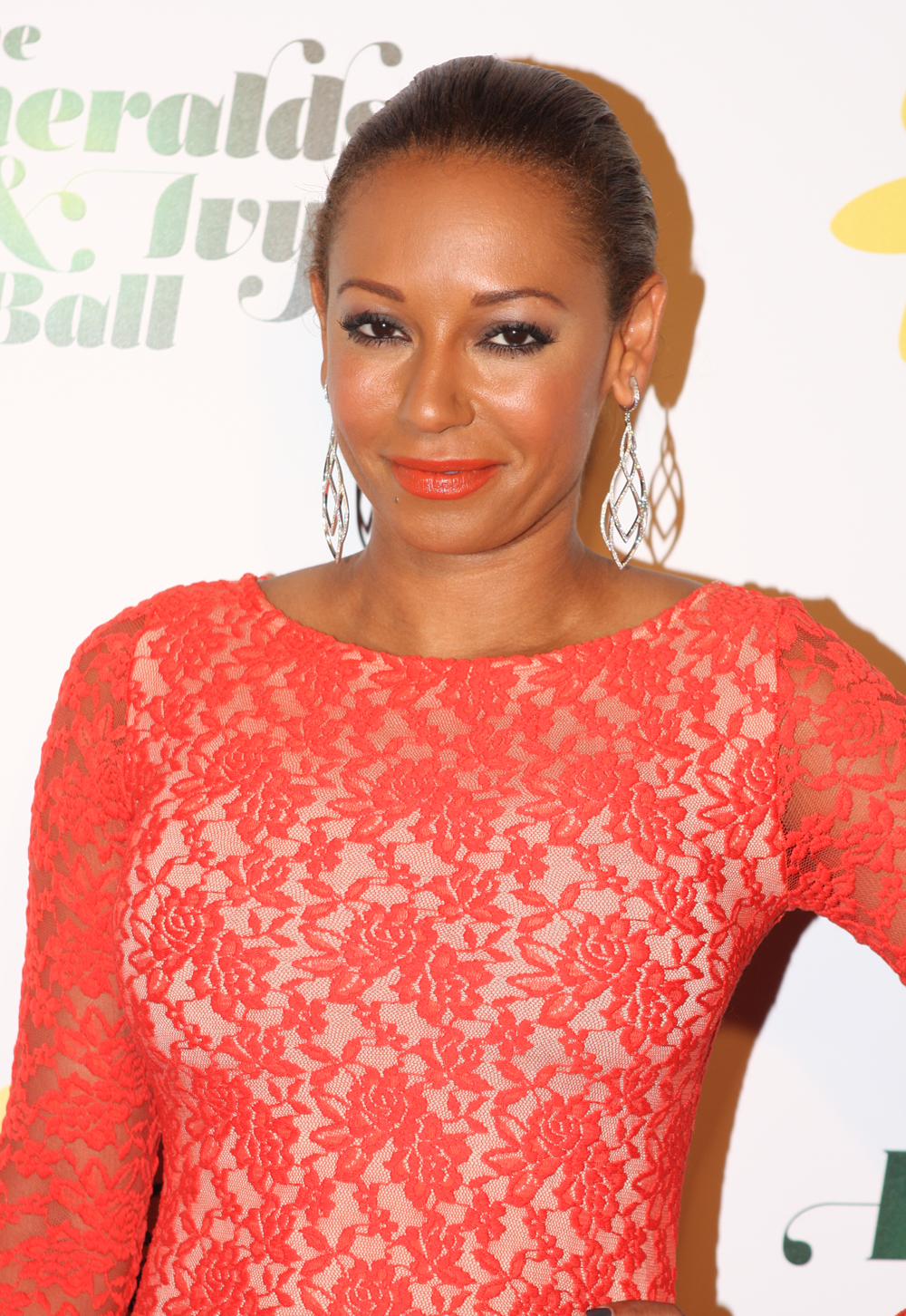
Mel B

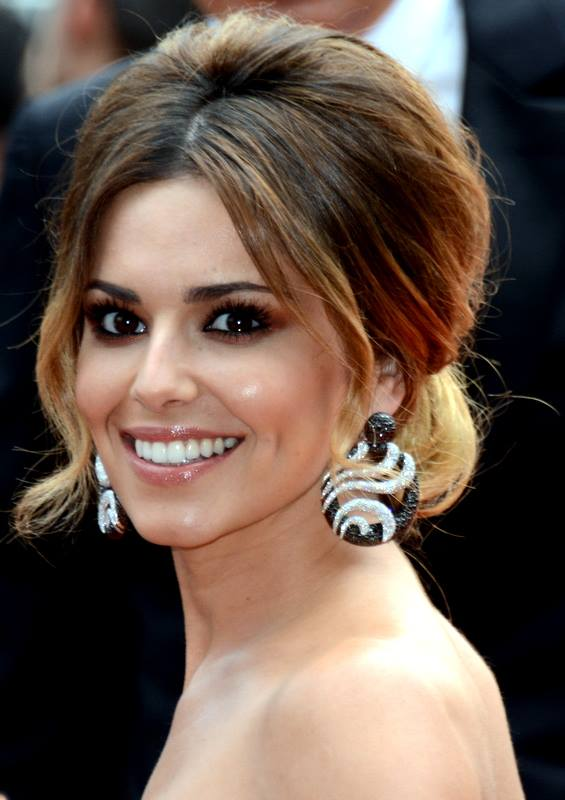
Cheryl Fernandez-Versini

Simon Cowell

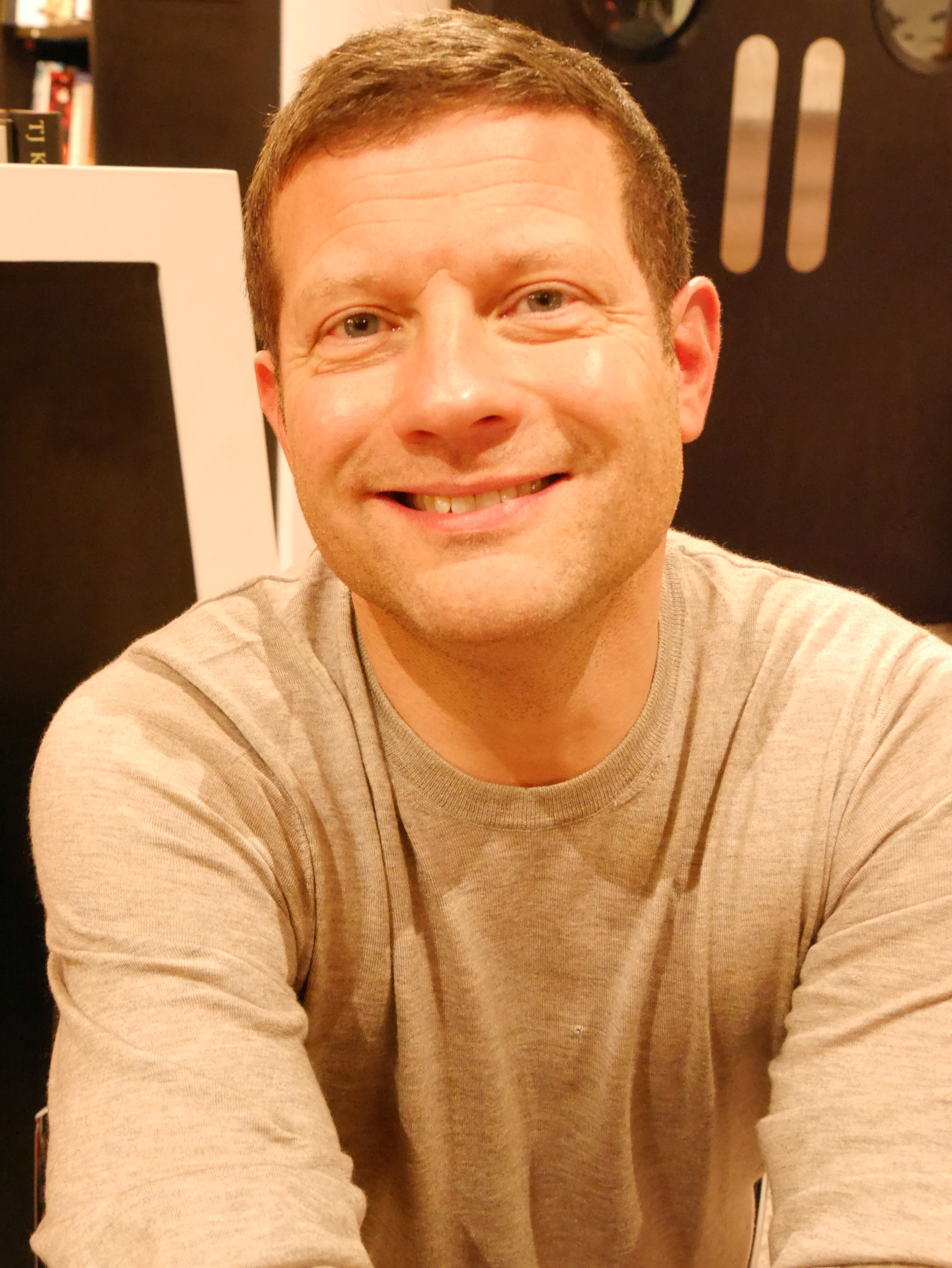
Dermot O'Leary (ITV1)

During the tenth series, Sharon Osbourne stated that she was only back for one series, to "go out on a high". Also, during the first live show of series 10, Gary Barlow revealed that it would be his last series on the show. Louis Walsh, who had also been on the show from its first series, announced his intention to quit as well, although he later backtracked and said that he "might come back" if Simon Cowell returned. Midway throughout the live shows, Walsh said "I'm having so much fun this year, I might stay".

On 7 February 2014, Cowell, who left the UK show after series 7 to launch and judge the USA show, announced his return for Gary Barlow's replacement. He said, "I'm absolutely thrilled to be returning to The X Factor UK. It's been three years since I last judged the competition and I'm excited to find a global superstar again. On 13 February, it was reported that Nicole Scherzinger had departed the show, On 14 February, Cowell announced that Scherzinger would not be returning by tweeting, "Nicole will always be a part of [T]he X factor family. Now signed to Sony as an artist. Thank you Nicole for everything.". On 24 February, former judge, Dannii Minogue confirmed that she would remain on The X Factor Australia judging panel for the 2014 Australian series, rather than return as a judge for the UK show to replace Scherzinger, after Minogue joined the Australia show the year before, despite popular demand in the UK for her to return for the 2014 UK series. On 10 March, former judge Cheryl Cole announced on her Instagram that she will be returning for the eleventh series to replace Osbourne, posting an image of herself and Cowell, accompanied by the caption: "GUESS WHAT!!.. I'm baaaacccckkkkk!!!!" On 30 May, Walsh confirmed he would be returning as a judge for his eleventh series. On 11 June, it was confirmed that series 9 guest judge Mel B, who has also previously judged the Australian show, would join the panel as the fourth permanent judge for Scherzinger's replacement. Radio 2 DJ Sara Cox was contracted on reserve to be a permanent fourth judge for the series if Mel B wasn’t available. Cole's wedding to Jean-Bernard Fernandez-Versini on 7 July, it was announced by producers that she would be known throughout the series as her new married name, Cheryl Fernandez-Versini. On 13 December 2014, it was announced that former judge Tulisa would return as a guest judge for the final due to Mel B being ill.

Dermot O'Leary confirmed his return for his eighth series as presenter of the main show on ITV. On 3 February 2014, it was reported that Matt Richardson would not return as co-presenter on The Xtra Factor on ITV2. This was later denied, but it was confirmed on 4 June that Richardson would not return. On 11 June, Caroline Flack confirmed on Twitter that she will not be returning as presenter of The Xtra Factor. The next day, it was confirmed that Sarah-Jane Crawford will be the new presenter. Following her departure, Flack began competing as a contestant in the twelfth series of Strictly Come Dancing on BBC One. Brian Friedman, who served as creative director from series 4-7 before returning to work on the first three live shows of series 9, returned to replace Jerry Reeve and Mark "Swany" Swanhart.

Series 11 was originally O'Leary's final series hosting The X Factor, as he announced in March 2015 his decision to exit the series to pursue other projects. He was later replaced by Caroline Flack and Olly Murs, the latter of whom was a contestant during the competition's sixth series. This was also originally the last series to feature Louis Walsh as a judge after 11 years, as he quit in May 2015 to return to full-time management. It was also the only series to feature new judge Spice Girls star Mel B. They were replaced by BBC Radio 1 presenter Nick Grimshaw and The Voice UK coach, Rita Ora. Osbourne, Walsh, Scherzinger (who collectively replaced Cheryl, Grimshaw and Ora) and O'Leary returned to the show alongside Cowell for the 13th and 14th series, with O'Leary remaining for series 15.

== Promotion ==
On 12 March 2014, Cowell and Cole, the only confirmed judges at the time, appeared in a Daybreak interview together to promote the eleventh series for the first time. They discussed the upcoming series, their individual returns, Cole's departure from The X Factor USA and their subsequent feud; with Cowell admitting, "I made a mistake" (in relation to Cole's sudden departure). Two advertisements subsequently began to air on ITV featuring Cole and Cowell separately, to encourage potential contestants to audition. Previous contestants Olly Murs, Shayne Ward, One Direction, Jahméne Douglas and Little Mix also appeared in videos encouraging potential applicants to audition.

Rumored judges for the series included Ellie Goulding, Paloma Faith, Rita Ora, Kesha, and Murs.

On 12 June, during ITV's coverage of the opening match of the 2014 FIFA World Cup, a teaser trailer with the caption "Things Are About to Get Loud" first aired. The full trailer, featuring all four of the judges, was unveiled on ITV's YouTube channel on 1 August, and received its first TV airing the following evening.

== Selection process ==
=== Eligibility ===
On 11 March 2014, Cowell confirmed at a press conference in London that closed room auditions would return for series 11, as well as the six-seat challenge at bootcamp. It was also revealed that the minimum age was being lowered from 16 to 14, as it was in series 4 and 5.

=== Auditions ===
==== Mobile auditions ====
In addition to the producers' auditions, the "Mobile Audition Tour" took place up and down the UK and Ireland throughout March and April. Auditions began to open on 24 March, and visited Cork, Belfast, Newquay, Exeter, Bournemouth, Southampton, Bristol, Newport, Barry, Swansea, Romford, Leicester, Brighton, Norwich, Sunderland, Middlesbrough, South Shields, Durham, Glasgow, Dundee, Aberdeen, Ayr, Solihull, Dudley, Coventry, Wolverhampton, Warrington, Leeds, Hull, Sheffield, Birkenhead, Blackpool, Bolton and Widnes by 28 April.

==== Open auditions ====
Cities where auditions were held.

Producers auditions commenced on 5 April in Dublin and ended on 5 May in Liverpool. For the first time, nine open auditions were held, instead of the usual six, and the five in series 6 and 10. This series marked the first time that auditions had visited Ireland since series 7. It was also the first time open auditions were held in Plymouth and Edinburgh.

Audition city	Open audition date	Open audition venue
Dublin	5 April 2014	Convention Centre Dublin
Plymouth	8 April 2014	Holiday Inn Plymouth
Cardiff	10 April 2014	Mercure Cardiff Holland House Hotel and Spa
London	13 April 2014	Emirates Stadium
Birmingham	23 April 2014	St. Andrew's
Edinburgh	27 April 2014	Murrayfield Stadium
Gateshead	30 April 2014	Sage Gateshead
Manchester	3 May 2014	Old Trafford Cricket Ground
Liverpool	5 May 2014	Liverpool Convention Centre

==== Judges auditions ====
Continuing from the format from the last series, both room auditions and arena auditions were held for the judges. In this series four locations were used for the judges auditions, the fewest used in a series at the time (series 12 used two). The auditions started in Manchester (Old Trafford Cricket Ground) on 16 and 17 June. The London auditions (Emirates Stadium) took place on 20 June and from 22–24 June, and were followed by Newcastle (St. James' Park) on 26 June, before concluding in Edinburgh (Assembly Rooms) on 1 July. The only judge missing from an audition day was Mel B, whose absence occurred during one of the arena audition days, due to commitments with America's Got Talent.

The first room audition episode aired on 30 August, and featured Manchester, London and Edinburgh. More room auditions from London, Edinburgh and Manchester, along with those from Newcastle, were shown in 31 August episode.

Notable returning auditionees included Fleur East who reached the live shows in series 2 in the girl group Addictiv Ladies; Chloe Jasmine, who was rejected by the judges at her audition in series 3; Amy Connelly, who reached judges' houses in series 5; Jake Quickenden, who reached judges' houses in series 9; Lydia Lucy, who reached bootcamp in series 10; Tom Mann, who reached bootcamp in series 10; Barclay Beales, who reached bootcamp in series 10; and Paul Akister, who reached judges houses in series 10. Mann and Beales were both eventually put into the eight-piece boy band Stereo Kicks.

City	Room auditions		Arena auditions	
City	Date(s)	Venue	Date(s)	Venue
Manchester	16–17 June 2014	Old Trafford Cricket Ground	—N/a	
London	20 June 2014	Emirates Stadium	1–4 August 2014	The SSE Arena, Wembley
London	22–24 June 2014	Emirates Stadium	1–4 August 2014	The SSE Arena, Wembley
Newcastle	26 June 2014	St James' Park	—N/a	
Edinburgh	1 July 2014	Assembly Rooms	—N/a	

=== Bootcamp/Six Chair Challenge ===
It was reported in March 2014 that Cowell was considering axing the bootcamp stage in favour of the "six chair challenge" from series 10, whereby judges were assigned their categories at the start of bootcamp and contestants took it in turns to perform for their judge. The six-seat challenge involves successful contestants being offered one of "six seats", representing places at the judges' houses stage of the competition. However, if a judge had already chosen six acts for their category, they could replace them if they preferred a later act. This was a controversial input to the series as many were disappointed to see acts sent home in such a harsh way.

Despite the reports, both bootcamp and the six chair challenge took place. A total of 114 acts successfully reached bootcamp this year. They were put into groups within their own categories and took part in a sing-off, which took place on 8 August, where the judges cut half of the acts, leaving only 55 acts. Mel B's commitments to America's Got Talent delayed her re-entry to the UK until the end of the bootcamp stage, after Cowell, Fernandez-Versini and Walsh had finished deliberating on the remaining contestants earlier that day. The judges then called back some rejected soloists to form an unnamed eight-piece boyband (later named Stereo Kicks after judges' houses) and an unnamed five-piece girl group, resulting in 57 acts competing for the "six chair challenge". It was only then that all four judges learned their categories: Mel B was given the Boys, Cowell was given the Over 26s, Fernandez-Versini was given the Girls and Walsh was given the Groups category. The six-seat challenge took place at The SSE Arena, Wembley on 9 and 10 August. Any contestant under 16 could not be swapped out if they were given a seat.

=== Judges' houses ===
For judges' houses, Mel B took the Boys to Cancún, with assistance from fellow Spice Girls member Emma Bunton; Cowell took the Over 26s to Los Angeles, where he was assisted by Sinitta;Fernandez-Versini took the Girls to Nice and was assisted by Tinie Tempah; and Walsh took the Groups to Bermuda and was assisted by former judge Tulisa.

Girls:

- Kerrianne: "Hurt"
- Lauren: "Beneath Your Beautiful"
- Emily: "Story of My Life"
- Chloe: "Somewhere Over the Rainbow"
- Stephanie: "Careless Whisper"
- Lola: "All of Me"

Boys:

- Danny: "Beautiful Disaster"
- Jordan: "Apologize"
- Paul: "Bridge over Troubled Water"
- Andrea: "And I Am Telling You I'm Not Going"
- Jack: "Halo"
- Jake: "Every Little Thing She Does Is Magic"

Groups:

- Only The Young: "Ghost"
- Stereo Kicks: "Mirrors"
- Blonde Electra: "Gold Digger"
- Concept: "XO"
- New Girl Group: "Say Something"
- The Brooks: "Jar of Hearts"

Over 26s

- Ben: "With a Little Help from My Friends"
- Fleur: "Bang Bang"
- Lizzy: "Don't Make Me"
- Helen: "I'd Rather Go Blind"
- Jay: "Everybody Hurts"
- Stevie: "I'm a Believer"

Summary of judges' houses
Judge	Category	Location	Guest Mentor(s)	Acts Eliminated	Wildcard
Cowell	Over 26s	Los Angeles	Sinitta	Helen Fulthorpe, Lizzy Pattinson	Stevi Ritchie
Fernandez-Versini	Girls	Nice	Tinie Tempah	Kerrianne Covell, Emily Middlemas	Lola Saunders
Mel B	Boys	Cancún	Emma Bunton	Danny Dearden, Jordan Morris	Jack Walton
Walsh	Groups	Bermuda	Tulisa	Concept, New Girl Group, The Brooks	Overload Generation*

Overload Generation were originally eliminated during Boot Camp after being switched out in the six chair challenge. Despite this, Mel B chose them as Walsh's Wildcard act over the three groups that had been eliminated during the Judges Houses round.

== Acts ==
Key:

– Winner
– Runner-up
– Wildcard (Live Shows)

Act	Age(s)	Hometown	Category (mentor)	Result
Ben Haenow	29	Croydon	Over 26s (Cowell)	Winner
Fleur East	27	Walthamstow	Over 26s (Cowell)	Runner-Up
Andrea Faustini	20	Rome, Italy	Boys (Mel B)	3rd Place
Lauren Platt	17	Billericay	Girls (Fernandez-Versini)	4th Place
Stereo Kicks	15–21	Various	Groups (Walsh)	5th Place
Stevi Ritchie	34	Colchester	Over 26s (Cowell)	6th Place
Only the Young	17–21	Various	Groups (Walsh)	7th Place
Jay James	31	Saundersfoot	Over 26s (Cowell)	8th Place
Paul Akister	25	Lancaster	Boys (Mel B)	9th Place
Lola Saunders	20	East Boldon	Girls (Fernandez-Versini)	10th Place
Jack Walton	18	Castleford	Boys (Mel B)	11th Place
Jake Quickenden	25	Scunthorpe	Boys (Mel B)	12th Place
Chloe Jasmine	24	Eastbourne	Girls (Fernandez-Versini)	13th Place
Stephanie Nala	20	Cheshunt	Girls (Fernandez-Versini)	14th Place
Overload Generation	18–20	Various	Groups (Walsh)	15th Place
Blonde Electra	22 & 24	Düsseldorf, Germany / London	Groups (Walsh)	16th Place

== Live shows ==
On September 24, 2014, a wildcard twist was announced for the live shows. However, in a change to previous years, the judges selected the wildcard acts for each other's categories. Fernandez-Versini chose Stevi Ritchie for the Over 26s; Mel B chose Overload Generation for the Groups; Cowell chose Jack Walton for the Boys; and Walsh chose Lola Saunders for the Girls. This meant that there would be 16 contestants, and there would be double eliminations like in series 7 and 8.

For the first time in the show's history, all votes via the official app will be free of charge. Mark Brittain, Global Head of Commercial at Syco Entertainment, announced, "We are constantly looking to innovate around the show. Giving the viewers the ability to vote free through the app will allow viewers, we believe, an even greater opportunity to interact with their favourite show and, of course, play the hugely important role in deciding the ultimate winner of the series."

The live shows began on 11 October 2014. Pharrell Williams and Taylor Swift performed on the first live results show, whilst Jessie J and Maroon 5 performed on the second live results show. The third live results show featured performances from OneRepublic and Ed Sheeran. The Script performed on the fourth live show, whilst John Legend and The X Factor judge Cheryl Fernandez-Versini performed on the following results show. The fifth live results show featured performances from Sam Smith and 2010 contestants One Direction, and the sixth live results show featured performances from former judge Nicole Scherzinger and 2009 runner-up Olly Murs. In addition, this results show had the world premiere of the official music video for Band Aid 30. The seventh live show included a performance from David Guetta featuring Emeli Sandé, while Labrinth and Take That performed on the following results show. Queen + Adam Lambert, series 9 contestants Union J and series 9 contestant Ella Henderson performed on the quarter-final results show on 30 November. The X Factor USA 2012 contestants, Fifth Harmony, The X Factor UK 2013 Sam Bailey, and Idina Menzel and Michael Bublé performed on the semi-final live results show on 7 December 2014. Take That, Meghan Trainor and Ed Sheeran performed on the live final on Saturday 13 December 2014, while Olly Murs featuring Demi Lovato, One Direction featuring Ronnie Wood and Sam Smith performed on the live final results show on Sunday 14 December 2014.

=== Results summary ===
Colour key

Act in Boys

Act in Girls

Act in Over 26s

Act in Groups

–	Act was in the bottom two/three and had to perform again in the sing-off
–	Act was in the bottom three but received the fewest votes and was immediately eliminated
–	Act received the fewest public votes and was immediately eliminated (no sing-off)
–	Act received the most public votes

Weekly results per act
Act	Week 1	Week 2	Week 3	Week 4	Week 5	Week 6	Week 7	Quarter-Final	Semi-Final	Final	
Act	Week 1	Week 2	Week 3	Week 4	Week 5	Week 6	Week 7	Quarter-Final	Semi-Final	Saturday Vote	Sunday Vote
Ben Haenow	4th 8.7%	4th 9.1%	3rd 10.1%	1st 12.2%	1st 14.8%	1st 16.4%	1st 19.4%	1st 26.4%	1st 36.5%	1st 45.1%	Winner; 57.2%^{1}
Fleur East	5th 6.0%	7th 6.0%	5th 9.3%	6th 9.4%	5th 10.8%	2nd 14.0%	2nd 16.1%	3rd 17.9%	2nd 24.3%	2nd 32.7%	Runner-Up; 34.3%^{1}
Andrea Faustini	1st 19.2%	1st 14.5%	1st 14.4%	2nd 11.9%	2nd 14.0%	4th 12.7%	6th 13.2%	2nd 21.0%	4th 19.1%	3rd 22.2%	Eliminated (final)
Lauren Platt	2nd 10.4%	2nd 12.7%	2nd 11.8%	4th 11.0%	3rd 13.1%	3rd 13.2%	3rd 16.0%	4th 17.8%	3rd 20.1%	Eliminated (semi-final)	
Stereo Kicks	11th 4.6%	12th 4.4%	6th 8.9%	9th 8.3%	4th 12.4%	5th 12.2%	4th 15.3%	5th 16.9%	Eliminated (quarter-final)		
Stevi Ritchie	10th 4.9%	8th 5.9%	7th 7.4%	3rd 11.5%	6th 10.3%	7th 10.8%	5th 14.7%	Eliminated (week 7)			
Only The Young	13th 4.0%	9th 5.6%	11th 5.2%	7th 9.0%	7th 8.5%	6th 12.2%	7th 5.3%	Eliminated (week 7)			
Jay James	7th 5.5%	5th 7.6%	8th 7.1%	8th 8.3%	8th 8.1%	8th 8.5%	Eliminated (week 6)				
Paul Akister	3rd 10.0%	3rd 9.9%	4th 9.4%	5th 9.5%	9th 8.0%	Eliminated (week 5)					
Lola Saunders	6th 5.7%	6th 7.6%	9th 6.9%	10th 6.3%	Eliminated (week 4)						
Jack Walton	9th 5.0%	10th 5.3%	10th 5.3%	11th 2.6%	Eliminated (week 4)						
Jake Quickenden	8th 5.1%	11th 4.8%	12th 4.2%	Eliminated (week 3)							
Chloe Jasmine	12th 4.3%	13th 4.0%	Eliminated (week 2)								
Stephanie Nala	14th 2.9%	14th 2.6%	Eliminated (week 2)								
Overload Generation	15th 2.7%	Eliminated (week 1)									
Blonde Electra	16th 1.0%	Eliminated (week 1)									
Sing-off	Nala, Overload Generation	Jasmine, Stereo Kicks	Only The Young, Quickenden	Saunders, Stereo Kicks	Akister, James	James, Ritchie	Faustini, Ritchie	Platt, Stereo Kicks	Faustini, Platt	No sing-off or judges' votes: results were based on public votes alone	
Walsh's vote to eliminate (Groups)	Nala	Jasmine	Quickenden	Saunders	Akister	Ritchie	Ritchie	Platt	Platt	No sing-off or judges' votes: results were based on public votes alone	
Mel B's vote to eliminate (Boys)	Nala	Jasmine	Only The Young	Saunders	James	James	Ritchie	Platt	Platt	No sing-off or judges' votes: results were based on public votes alone	
Fernandez-Versini's vote to eliminate (Girls)	Overload Generation	Stereo Kicks	Quickenden	Stereo Kicks	James	James	Ritchie	Stereo Kicks	Faustini	No sing-off or judges' votes: results were based on public votes alone	
Cowell's vote to eliminate (Over 26s)	Overload Generation	Jasmine	Quickenden	Stereo Kicks	Akister	Ritchie	Faustini	Stereo Kicks	Platt	No sing-off or judges' votes: results were based on public votes alone	
Eliminated	Blonde Electra; 1.0% to save	Stephanie Nala; 2.6% to save	Jake Quickenden; 3 of 4 votes Majority	Jack Walton; 2.6% to save	Paul Akister; 2 of 4 votes Deadlock	Jay James; 2 of 4 votes Deadlock	Only The Young; 5.3% to save	Stereo Kicks; 2 of 4 votes Deadlock	Lauren Platt; 3 of 4 votes Majority	Andrea Faustini; 22.2% to save	Fleur East; 34.3% to win
Eliminated	Overload Generation; 2 of 4 votes Deadlock	Chloe Jasmine; 3 of 4 votes Majority	Jake Quickenden; 3 of 4 votes Majority	Lola Saunders; 2 of 4 votes Deadlock	Paul Akister; 2 of 4 votes Deadlock	Jay James; 2 of 4 votes Deadlock	Stevi Ritchie; 3 of 4 votes Majority	Stereo Kicks; 2 of 4 votes Deadlock	Lauren Platt; 3 of 4 votes Majority	Andrea Faustini; 22.2% to save	Fleur East; 34.3% to win
Reference(s)											

- ^1 The voting percentages in the Final for the Sunday Vote do not add up to 100%, owing to the freezing of votes. Andrea Faustini received 8.5% of the final vote.

=== Live show details ===
==== Week 1 (11/12 October) ====
- Theme: Number ones
- Group performance: "Anything Could Happen"
- Musical guests: Pharrell Williams ("Gust of Wind") and Taylor Swift ("Shake It Off")

The wildcard acts were announced at the beginning of the show with Jack Walton chosen by Cowell for the Boys, Lola Saunders was chosen by Walsh for the Girls, Stevi Ritchie was chosen by Fernandez-Versini for the Over 26s, and Overload Generation were chosen by Mel B for the Groups.

Acts' performances on the first live show
Act	Category (mentor)	Order	Song	Result
Paul Akister	Boys (Mel B)	1	"Ghost"	Safe
Lola Saunders (Wildcard Girls)	Girls (Fernandez-Versini)	2	"Stay with Me"	Safe
Overload Generation (Wildcard Groups)	Groups (Walsh)	3	"I Kissed a Girl"	Bottom Three
Jay James	Over 26s (Cowell)	4	"Changing"	Safe
Stephanie Nala	Girls (Fernandez-Versini)	5	"Everything I Own"	Bottom Three
Jack Walton (Wildcard Boys)	Boys (Mel B)	6	"Only Girl (In the World)"	Safe
Chloe Jasmine	Girls (Fernandez-Versini)	7	"Toxic"	Safe
Stereo Kicks	Groups (Walsh)	8	"Roar"	Safe
Stevi Ritchie (Wildcard Over 26s)	Over 26s (Cowell)	9	"Livin' la Vida Loca"	Safe
Lauren Platt	Girls (Fernandez-Versini)	10	"Happy"	Safe
Blonde Electra	Groups (Walsh)	11	"Kids in America"	Eliminated
Ben Haenow	Over 26s (Cowell)	12	"Bridge over Troubled Water"	Safe
Jake Quickenden	Boys (Mel B)	13	"She's the One"	Safe
Fleur East	Over 26s (Cowell)	14	"All About That Bass"	Safe
Only The Young	Groups (Walsh)	15	"Jailhouse Rock"/"Twist and Shout"	Safe
Andrea Faustini	Boys (Mel B)	16	"Earth Song"	Safe (Highest Votes)
Sing-off details
Overload Generation	Groups (Walsh)	1	"A Thousand Years"	Eliminated
Stephanie Nala	Girls (Fernandez-Versini)	2	"Have You Ever?"	Safe

- Owing to the addition of four wildcard acts, two acts were eliminated from the series' first results show. The three acts with the fewest public votes were announced as the bottom three and then the act with the fewest votes was automatically eliminated. The remaining two acts then performed in the sing-off for the judges' votes.

Judges' vote to eliminate

- Cowell: Overload Generation – stated that he thought Nala's sing-off performance was better than Overload Generation's "shockingly bad" performance and said that he "absolutely cannot support an act [he has] no belief in at all", and Nala is someone he could work with; he reiterated his statement on The Xtra Factor, saying he was not surprised about Overload Generation ending up in the bottom three and that Nala's saving was a "lucky escape" on his doing.
- Fernandez-Versini: Overload Generation – backed her own act, Stephanie Nala, whom she said sang better in the sing off.
- Mel B: Stephanie Nala – stated that she had to support Overload Generation, whom she reinstated as Walsh's wildcard.
- Walsh: Stephanie Nala – backed his own act, Overload Generation.

With the acts in the sing-off receiving two votes each, the result went to deadlock and reverted to the earlier public vote. Overload Generation were eliminated as the act with the fewest public votes.

==== Week 2 (18/19 October) ====
- Theme: 1980s music
- Group performance: "Love Runs Out"
- Musical guests: Jessie J ("Bang Bang") and Maroon 5 ("Animals")

Acts' performances on the second live show
Act	Category (mentor)	Order	Year	Song	Result
Jack Walton	Boys (Mel B)	1	1988	"Straight Up"	Safe
Stephanie Nala	Girls (Fernandez-Versini)	2	1980	"Call Me"	Eliminated
Andrea Faustini	Boys (Mel B)	3	1988	"One Moment in Time"	Safe (Highest Votes)
Lauren Platt	Girls (Fernandez-Versini)	4	1983	"Flashdance... What a Feeling"	Safe
Ben Haenow	Over 26s (Cowell)	5	1985	"Jealous Guy"	Safe
Fleur East	Over 26s (Cowell)	6	1990	"It's a Shame (My Sister)"	Safe
Stereo Kicks	Groups (Walsh)	7	1984	"The Boys of Summer"	Bottom Three
Lola Saunders	Girls (Fernandez-Versini)	8	1980	"Imagine"	Safe
Jake Quickenden	Boys (Mel B)	9	1983	"Total Eclipse of the Heart"	Safe
Chloe Jasmine	Girls (Fernandez-Versini)	10	1980	"Fame"	Bottom Three
Paul Akister	Boys (Mel B)	11	1980	"If You Don't Know Me by Now"	Safe
Stevi Ritchie	Over 26s (Cowell)	12	1987	"Never Gonna Give You Up"	Safe
Only The Young	Groups (Walsh)	13	1982	"Come On Eileen"	Safe
Jay James	Over 26s (Cowell)	14	1988	"I'm Gonna Be (500 Miles)"	Safe
Sing-off details
Chloe Jasmine	Girls (Fernandez-Versini)	1	"Will You Love Me Tomorrow"		Eliminated
Stereo Kicks	Groups (Walsh)	2	"I'll Stand by You"		Safe

- Owing to the addition of four wildcard acts, two acts were eliminated from the series' second results show. The three acts with the fewest public votes were announced as the bottom three and then the act with the fewest votes was automatically eliminated. The remaining two acts then performed in the sing-off for the judges' votes.

Judges' vote to eliminate

- Fernandez-Versini: Stereo Kicks – gave no reason but effectively backed her own act, Chloe Jasmine.
- Walsh: Chloe Jasmine – gave no reason but effectively backed his own act, Stereo Kicks.
- Mel B: Chloe Jasmine – based on the sing-off performances.
- Cowell: Chloe Jasmine – stated that he thought Walsh did not know "what to do with" Stereo Kicks, but that they had more potential; he stated on The Xtra Factor that he felt they wanted their place in the competition more.

==== Week 3 (25/26 October) ====
- Theme: "Movies" (songs from films)
- Group performance: "Rather Be"
- Musical guests: OneRepublic ("I Lived") and Ed Sheeran ("Thinking Out Loud")

Acts' performances on the third live show
Act	Category (mentor)	Order	Song	Film	Result
Jake Quickenden	Boys (Mel B)	1	"She's Like the Wind"	Dirty Dancing	Bottom Two
Only The Young	Groups (Walsh)	2	"Boom Clap"	The Fault in Our Stars	Bottom Two
Jay James	Over 26s (Cowell)	3	"Skyfall"	Skyfall	Safe
Andrea Faustini	Boys (Mel B)	4	"Listen"	Dreamgirls	Safe (Highest Votes)
Lola Saunders	Girls (Fernandez-Versini)	5	"When You Believe"	The Prince of Egypt	Safe
Paul Akister	Boys (Mel B)	6	"Try a Little Tenderness"	The Commitments	Safe
Lauren Platt	Girls (Fernandez-Versini)	7	"Let It Go"	Frozen	Safe
Jack Walton	Boys (Mel B)	8	"Eye of the Tiger"	Rocky III	Safe
Fleur East	Over 26s (Cowell)	9	"Lady Marmalade"	Moulin Rouge!	Safe
Stevi Ritchie	Over 26s (Cowell)	10	"Footloose"	Footloose	Safe
Stereo Kicks	Groups (Walsh)	11	"Let It Be"/"Hey Jude"	Across the Universe	Safe
Ben Haenow	Over 26s (Cowell)	12	"I Don't Want to Miss a Thing"	Armageddon	Safe
Sing-off details
Jake Quickenden	Boys (Mel B)	1	"Red"		Eliminated
Only The Young	Groups (Walsh)	2	"The Winner Takes It All"		Safe

Judges' vote to eliminate

- Mel B: Only The Young – gave no reason but effectively backed her own act, Jake Quickenden.
- Walsh: Jake Quickenden – backed his own act, Only The Young.
- Cowell: Jake Quickenden – criticised both acts' sing-off performances but felt that Only The Young had more potential.
- Fernandez-Versini: Jake Quickenden – felt that Only The Young had not identified their "comfort zone yet" and had "the most potential to go forward in the competition".

==== Week 4 (1/2 November) ====
- Theme: Halloween
- Group performance: "Firework"
- Musical guests:
  - Saturday: The Script ("No Good in Goodbye")
  - Sunday: John Legend ("Ordinary People"/"All of Me") and Cheryl ("I Don't Care")

Acts' performances on the fourth live show
Act	Category (mentor)	Order	Song	Result
Ben Haenow	Over 26s (Cowell)	1	"Highway to Hell"	Safe (Highest Votes)
Lola Saunders	Girls (Fernandez-Versini)	2	"Crazy"	Bottom Two
Fleur East	Over 26s (Cowell)	3	"Thriller"	Safe
Jack Walton	Boys (Mel B)	4	"Bleeding Love"	Eliminated
Jay James	Over 26s (Cowell)	5	"Mad World"	Safe
Andrea Faustini	Boys (Mel B)	6	"Relight My Fire"	Safe
Lauren Platt	Girls (Fernandez-Versini)	7	"Dark Horse"	Safe
Paul Akister	Boys (Mel B)	8	"Bat Out of Hell"	Safe
Only The Young	Groups (Walsh)	9	"Monster Mash"	Safe
Stereo Kicks	Groups (Walsh)	10	"Everybody (Backstreet's Back)"	Bottom Two
Stevi Ritchie	Over 26s (Cowell)	11	"The Music of the Night"	Safe
Sing-off details
Lola Saunders	Girls (Fernandez-Versini)	1	"(You Make Me Feel Like) A Natural Woman"	Eliminated
Stereo Kicks	Groups (Walsh)	2	"Perfect"	Safe

Notes

- On 31 October, it was revealed that, after warnings by Cowell to the contestants, the act with the fewest votes on Saturday's live show would be eliminated immediately. Walton was eliminated after receiving the fewest votes. The two acts with the next fewest votes on Sunday's results show then performed in the sing-off for the judges' votes.

Judges' vote to eliminate

- Walsh: Lola Saunders – backed his own act, Stereo Kicks, although he later stated on The Xtra Factor that he did not want to send Saunders home as he reinstated her as Fernandez-Versini's wildcard.
- Fernandez-Versini: Stereo Kicks – backed her own act, Lola Saunders.
- Mel B: Lola Saunders – based on the sing-off performances, but complained about Stereo Kicks' lack of consistency.
- Cowell: Stereo Kicks – said that Saunders performed better in the sing-off.

With the acts in the sing-off receiving two votes each, the result went to deadlock and reverted to the earlier public vote. Saunders was eliminated as the act with the fewest public votes.

==== Week 5 (8/9 November) ====
- Theme: Songs by Queen or Michael Jackson (billed as Queen vs. Michael Jackson; original theme was Disco)
- Group performance: "Never Forget"
- Musical guests: Sam Smith ("Like I Can") and One Direction ("Steal My Girl")

Acts' performances on the fifth live show
Act	Category (mentor)	Order	Song	Artist	Result
Paul Akister	Boys (Mel B)	1	"Don't Stop Me Now"	Queen	Bottom Two
Jay James	Over 26s (Cowell)	2	"The Show Must Go On"	Queen	Bottom Two
Lauren Platt	Girls (Fernandez-Versini)	3	"I'll Be There"	Michael Jackson	Safe
Only The Young	Groups (Walsh)	4	"Blame It on the Boogie"	Michael Jackson	Safe
Ben Haenow	Over 26s (Cowell)	5	"Man in the Mirror"	Michael Jackson	Safe (Highest Votes)
Stevi Ritchie	Over 26s (Cowell)	6	"Bohemian Rhapsody"	Queen	Safe
Stereo Kicks	Groups (Walsh)	7	"You Are Not Alone"	Michael Jackson	Safe
Fleur East	Over 26s (Cowell)	8	"Will You Be There"	Michael Jackson	Safe
Andrea Faustini	Boys (Mel B)	9	"Somebody to Love"	Queen	Safe
Sing-off details
Paul Akister	Boys (Mel B)	1	"Clown"		Eliminated
Jay James	Over 26s (Cowell)	2	"Tears in Heaven"		Safe

Judges vote to eliminate

- Cowell: Paul Akister – backed his own act, Jay James, stating that he needed the opportunity the show has given him.
- Mel B: Jay James – gave no reason but effectively backed her own act, Paul Akister.
- Fernandez-Versini: Jay James – based on the sing-off performances.
- Walsh: Paul Akister – could not decide and sent the result to deadlock; he was hesitant to say who he wanted to eliminate, as he had previously eliminated Akister at judges' houses in series 10.

With the acts in the sing-off receiving two votes each, the result went to deadlock and reverted to the earlier public vote. Akister was eliminated as the act with the fewest public votes.

==== Week 6 (15/16 November) ====
- Theme: Big band
- Group performance: "Shake It Off"

Musical guests: Nicole Scherzinger ("Run") and Olly Murs ("Wrapped Up") The world premiere play and official video of the Band Aid 30 track "Do They Know It's Christmas?" were aired during the results show. Bob Geldof appeared on the results show to talk about the recording and promote the single.

Acts' performances on the sixth live show
Act	Category (mentor)	Order	Song	Big Band Artist	Result
Andrea Faustini	Boys (Mel B)	1	"Summertime"	Ella Fitzgerald	Safe
Lauren Platt	Girls (Fernandez-Versini)	2	"Smile"	Charlie Chaplin	Safe
Jay James	Over 26s (Cowell)	3	"Empire State of Mind"/"Theme from New York, New York"	Alicia Keys/Frank Sinatra	Bottom Two
Stereo Kicks	Groups (Walsh)	4	"Mack the Knife"	Bobby Darin	Safe
Ben Haenow	Over 26s (Cowell)	5	"Cry Me a River"	Michael Bublé	Safe (Highest Votes)
Only The Young	Groups (Walsh)	6	"I Wan'na Be Like You"	Louis Prima	Safe
Stevi Ritchie	Over 26s (Cowell)	7	"Mambo No. 5"/"She Bangs"	Lou Bega / Ricky Martin	Bottom Two
Fleur East	Over 26s (Cowell)	8	"Bang Bang"	Jessie J, Ariana Grande & Nicki Minaj	Safe
Sing-off details
Jay James	Over 26s (Cowell)	1	"Somewhere Only We Know"		Eliminated
Stevi Ritchie	Over 26s (Cowell)	2	"Somebody to Love"		Safe

Judges vote to eliminate

- Cowell: Stevi Ritchie – conflicted about both his acts in the bottom two; said although Ritchie was the better performer, James was the better singer.
- Walsh: Stevi Ritchie – said James was the better singer.
- Mel B: Jay James – said James did amazing in the sing off but Ritchie surprised her by singing.
- Fernandez-Versini: Jay James – stated she would miss Ritchie's presence if she sent Ritchie home as she reinstated him as Cowell's wildcard.

With the acts in the sing-off receiving two votes each, the result went to deadlock and reverted to the earlier public vote. James was eliminated as the act with the fewest public votes.

==== Week 7 (22/23 November) ====
- Theme: Songs by Whitney Houston or Elton John (billed as Whitney Houston vs. Elton John)
- Group performance: "Saturday Night's Alright for Fighting"
- Musical guests:
  - Saturday: David Guetta featuring Emeli Sandé ("What I Did for Love")
  - Sunday: Labrinth ("Jealous") and Take That ("These Days")

Acts' performances on the seventh live show
Act	Category (mentor)	Order	Song	Artist	Result
Lauren Platt	Girls (Fernandez-Versini)	1	"How Will I Know"	Whitney Houston	Safe
Ben Haenow	Over 26s (Cowell)	2	"I Will Always Love You"	Whitney Houston	Safe (Highest Votes)
Only The Young	Groups (Walsh)	3	"Something About the Way You Look Tonight"	Elton John	Eliminated
Andrea Faustini	Boys (Mel B)	4	"I Have Nothing"	Whitney Houston	Bottom Two
Fleur East	Over 26s (Cowell)	5	"I'm Every Woman"	Whitney Houston	Safe
Stevi Ritchie	Over 26s (Cowell)	6	"I'm Still Standing"	Elton John	Bottom Two
Stereo Kicks	Groups (Walsh)	7	"Don't Let the Sun Go Down on Me"	Elton John	Safe
Sing-off details
Andrea Faustini	Boys (Mel B)	1	"Stop!"		Safe
Stevi Ritchie	Over 26s (Cowell)	2	"This Is the Moment"		Eliminated

Notes

- This week featured a double elimination. The first of the eliminations happened on Saturday night after the special guest performance from David Guetta and Emeli Sande. Only The Young were eliminated after receiving the fewest votes. The two acts with the next fewest votes on Sunday's results show then performed in the sing-off for the judges' votes.

Judges' votes to eliminate

- Mel B: Stevi Ritchie – based on the sing-off performances, effectively backing her own act, Andrea Faustini.
- Fernandez-Versini: Stevi Ritchie – based on the sing-off performances and the fact that she saved Ritchie the previous week.
- Cowell: Andrea Faustini – backed his own act, Stevi Ritchie.
- Walsh: Stevi Ritchie – stated that he admired Faustini from the beginning.

However, voting statistics revealed that Ritchie received more votes than Faustini which meant that if Walsh sent the result to deadlock, Ritchie would have advanced to the quarter-final and Faustini would have been eliminated.

==== Week 8: Quarter-Final (29/30 November) ====
- Themes: Songs chosen by other artists; Jukebox
- Group performance: "Somebody to Love" (with Queen + Adam Lambert)
- Musical guests: Queen + Adam Lambert ("Somebody to Love", with finalists), Union J ("You Got It All") and Ella Henderson ("Yours")

For the first time this series, the acts performed two songs each. One song was chosen by a public vote via the official The X Factor app. The second song was chosen by various music artists.

List of song choices for the jukebox themes
Act	Category (mentor)	Song choices	Result
Fleur East	Over 26s (Cowell)		
Fleur East	Over 26s (Cowell)	"If I Ain't Got You"	Chosen
Fleur East	Over 26s (Cowell)	"Family Portrait"	Not Chosen
Fleur East	Over 26s (Cowell)	"If You Love Me"	Not Chosen
Andrea Faustini	Boys (Mel B)	"Respect"	Not Chosen
Andrea Faustini	Boys (Mel B)	"Heartless"	Not Chosen
Andrea Faustini	Boys (Mel B)	"Hero"	Chosen
Ben Haenow	Over 26s (Cowell)		Chosen
Ben Haenow	Over 26s (Cowell)	"Thinking Out Loud"	Chosen
Ben Haenow	Over 26s (Cowell)	"You Are So Beautiful"	Not Chosen
Ben Haenow	Over 26s (Cowell)	"With a Little Help from My Friends"	Not Chosen
Lauren Platt	Girls (Fernandez-Versini)	"Ain't Nobody"	Not Chosen
Lauren Platt	Girls (Fernandez-Versini)	"Don't You Worry Child"	Chosen
Lauren Platt	Girls (Fernandez-Versini)	"Story of My Life"	Not Chosen
Stereo Kicks	Groups (Walsh)		
Stereo Kicks	Groups (Walsh)	"Run"	Chosen
Stereo Kicks	Groups (Walsh)	"Fix You"	Not Chosen
Stereo Kicks	Groups (Walsh)	"Against All Odds (Take a Look at Me Now)"	Not Chosen

Acts' performances in the quarter-final
Act	Category (mentor)	Order	First song	Chosen by	Order	Second song	Chosen by	Result
Ben Haenow	Over 26s (Cowell)	1	"Come Together"	One Direction	7	"Thinking Out Loud"	Public Vote	Safe (Highest Votes)
Lauren Platt	Girls (Fernandez-Versini)	2	"Clarity"	Little Mix	6	"Don't You Worry Child"	Public Vote	Bottom Two
Stereo Kicks	Groups (Walsh)	3	"Just the Way You Are"	Tulisa	8	"Run"	Public Vote	Bottom Two
Fleur East	Over 26s (Cowell)	4	"A Fool in Love"	Emeli Sandé	9	"If I Ain't Got You"	Public Vote	Safe
Andrea Faustini	Boys (Mel B)	5	"Chandelier"	Sam Smith	10	"Hero"	Public Vote	Safe
Sing-off details
Lauren Platt	Girls (Fernandez-Versini)	1	"I Know Where I've Been"					Safe
Stereo Kicks	Groups (Walsh)	2	"I Won't Give Up"					Eliminated

Judges' vote to eliminate

- Walsh: Lauren Platt – backed his own act, Stereo Kicks.
- Mel B: Lauren Platt – based on the sing-off performances, although she expressed her reluctance to vote before Fernandez-Versini.
- Fernandez-Versini: Stereo Kicks – backed her own act, Lauren Platt.
- Cowell: Stereo Kicks – based on the sing-off performances stating that Platt sang the best in the sing-off.

With the acts in the sing-off receiving two votes each, the result went to deadlock and reverted to the earlier public vote. Stereo Kicks were eliminated as the act with the fewest public votes.

==== Week 9: Semi-Final (6/7 December) ====
- Themes: Christmas; song to get you to the final (no theme)
- Musical guests: Fifth Harmony ("BO$$"), Sam Bailey ("With You") and Idina Menzel & Michael Bublé ("Baby, It's Cold Outside")

Acts' performances in the semi-final
Act	Category (mentor)	Order	First song	Order	Second song	Result
Fleur East	Over 26s (Cowell)	1	"All I Want for Christmas Is You"	6	"Uptown Funk"	Safe
Lauren Platt	Girls (Fernandez-Versini)	2	"Stay Another Day"	5	"Story of My Life"	Bottom Two
Ben Haenow	Over 26s (Cowell)	3	"Please Come Home for Christmas"	8	"Hallelujah"	Safe (Highest Votes)
Andrea Faustini	Boys (Mel B)	4	"O Holy Night"	7	"Wrecking Ball"	Bottom Two
Sing-off details
Lauren Platt	Girls (Fernandez-Versini)	1	"There You'll Be"			Eliminated
Andrea Faustini	Boys (Mel B)	2	"Who You Are"			Safe

Judges vote to eliminate

- Fernandez-Versini: Andrea Faustini – gave no reason but effectively backed her own act, Lauren Platt.
- Mel B: Lauren Platt – backed her own act, Andrea Faustini, but called Platt's vocals one of her best.
- Walsh: Lauren Platt – gave no reason.
- Cowell: Lauren Platt – noted that this was both contestants' second time in the bottom two, and despite supporting his decision to send Platt through to the semi-final and criticising Faustini's oversinging, decided that Faustini had earned his overall place in the final throughout the series more.

However, voting statistics revealed that Platt received more votes than Faustini which meant that if Cowell sent the result to deadlock, Platt would have advanced to the final and Faustini would have been eliminated.

==== Week 10: Final (13/14 December) ====
Mel B did not appear on the judging panel on Saturday's show due to illness and was replaced by former judge Tulisa. Mel B returned to the panel for Sunday's show, but was too unwell to appear later during The Xtra Factor.

13 December

- Themes: No theme; celebrity duets
- Group performance: "Rule the World" (with Take That); "All About That Bass" (with Meghan Trainor)
- Musical guests: Take That ("Rule the World", with contestants); Meghan Trainor ("All About That Bass", with contestants); Stevi Ritchie, Chloe Jasmine, Wagner, Diva Fever, Chico Slimani & Katie Waissel ("(I've Had) The Time of My Life " / "The Time (Dirty Bit)"); and Ed Sheeran ("Photograph")

Acts' performances on the Saturday Final
Act	Category (mentor)	Order	New song	Order	Duet song	Partner	Result
Ben Haenow	Over 26s (Cowell)	1	"Demons"	4	"Thinking Out Loud"	Ed Sheeran	Safe (Highest Votes)
Andrea Faustini	Boys (Mel B)	2	"Feeling Good"	5	"Ghost"	Ella Henderson	Eliminated
Fleur East	Over 26s (Cowell)	3	"Can't Hold Us"	6	"Beneath Your Beautiful"	Labrinth	Safe

Andrea Faustini received the fewest public votes and was automatically eliminated.

14 December

- Themes: Favourite performance (billed as "song of the series"); winner's single
- Group performance: "Flashdance... What a Feeling" (all contestants)
- Musical guests: Olly Murs featuring Demi Lovato ("Up"), One Direction featuring Ronnie Wood ("Where Do Broken Hearts Go") and Sam Smith ("Stay with Me")

Acts' performances on the Sunday Final
Act	Category (mentor)	Order	Favourite Song	Originally Performed In	Order	Winner's Song	Result
Ben Haenow	Over 26s (Cowell)	1	"Man in the Mirror"	The Fifth Week	3	"Something I Need"	Winner
Fleur East	Over 26s (Cowell)	2	"Uptown Funk"	The Semi-Final	4	"Something I Need"	Runner-Up

== Ratings ==
Episode	Air date	Duration (minutes)^{1}	Share (%)	Official ITV rating (millions)^{2}	Official ITV HD rating (millions)	Official ITV+1 rating (millions)	Total viewers (millions)	Weekly rank^{3}
Auditions 1	30 August	85	40.9	8.33	1.76	0.56	10.65	1
Auditions 2	31 August	60	32.2	7.48	1.36	0.69	9.53	3
Auditions 3	6 September	80	39.4	8.08	1.52	0.53	10.13	1
Auditions 4	7 September	65	28.4	7.03	1.46	0.74	9.23	3
Auditions 5	13 September	80	38.9	8.09	1.62	0.50	10.21	1
Auditions 6	14 September	60	32.9	7.61	1.47	0.71	9.79	3
Auditions 7	20 September	80	39.2	8.13	1.57	0.25	9.95	3
Auditions 8	21 September	60	35.2	7.72	1.63	0.41	9.76	4
Bootcamp 1	26 September	60	23.3	5.62	1.19	0.64	7.45	13
Bootcamp 2	27 September	80	32.3	7.16	1.31	0.55	9.02	4
Bootcamp 3	28 September	60	35.4	8.16	1.42	0.52	10.10	2
Judges' houses 1	3 October	60	27.7	6.08	1.20	0.36	7.64	16
Judges' houses 2	4 October	80	30.4	6.76	1.40	0.47	8.63	6
Judges' houses 3	5 October	60	33.9	7.78	1.80	0.40	9.98	3
Live show 1	11 October	150	31.3	6.74	1.57	0.49	8.80	6
Live results 1	12 October	60	33.7	7.58	1.75	0.31	9.64	4
Live show 2	18 October	140	33.2	6.74	1.65	0.35	8.74	4
Live results 2	19 October	60	33.6	7.45	1.52	0.29	9.26	3
Live show 3	25 October	130	31.6	6.49	1.53	0.32	8.34	8
Live results 3	26 October	60	31.1	6.82	1.39	0.27	8.48	7
Live show 4	1 November	135	31.7	6.83	1.34	—N/a^{2}	8.17	10
Live results 4	2 November	60	28.9	6.70	1.42	0.29	8.41	9
Live show 5	8 November	105	33.2	7.01	1.57	0.31	8.89	7
Live results 5	9 November	60	27.6	6.54	1.31	0.33	8.18	9
Live show 6	15 November	100	32.6	6.74	1.54	0.32	8.60	8
Live results 6	16 November	60	31.9	7.22	1.64	0.35	9.21	5
Live show 7	22 November	100	32.4	6.84	1.39	—N/a^{2}	8.23	12
Live results 7	23 November	60	30.4	6.84	1.43	—N/a^{2}	8.27	11
Live show 8	29 November	105	33.1	6.96	1.42	—N/a^{2}	8.38	10
Live results 8	30 November	60	30.4	6.84	1.46	—N/a^{2}	8.30	11
Live show 9	6 December	90	31.0	6.25	1.48	—N/a^{2}	7.73	12
Live results 9	7 December	60	31.4	7.12	1.53	—N/a^{2}	8.65	11
Live final	13 December	125	35.8	7.34	1.59	—N/a^{2}	8.93	4
Live final results	14 December	125	35.2	8.03	1.85	—N/a^{2}	9.88	3
Series average		—N/a	32.7	7.15	1.50	0.44^{4}	8.98	—N/a

^{1} Includes advert breaks
^{2} The ITV+1 figure for this episode is unavailable as it was outside the top 10 programmes of the week on BARB.
^{3} The rank for the ITV broadcast, compared with all channels for that week, from Monday to Sunday.
^{4} The average figure for ITV+1 includes only the episodes with figures available.

== Controversies ==
=== Adam Miller ===
In July 2014, it was reported that auditionee Adam Miller was suing producers of the show for "cruel" treatment, claiming that they urged him to audition and persuaded him that he "wouldn't be embarrassing" himself, but he was then laughed at by Cowell during his audition which caused much controversy. Miller reportedly required counselling, and said, "I've been lied to, manipulated and used by the show and I can't be the only one. It might be Simon Cowell and it might be The X Factor, but that's wrong and I'm not going to let them get away with it. They approached me. They gave me a bit of self-confidence, then cruelly and deliberately stripped it away to make good TV." A spokesperson confirmed that Miller's audition would not be broadcast.

=== Chloe Jasmine ===
There were allegations of favouritism after Chloe Jasmine was allowed to audition twice. She apparently fluffed her arena audition by forgetting her words and bursting into tears, but none of this was shown on television. Instead, viewers saw Jasmine sail through to bootcamp after wowing the judges on a different night and singing the song "Why Don't You Do Right", tricking them into thinking that that had been her only audition. However, a show insider claimed that Chloe was given a second chance because she was going through a rough time: "Chloe was given a second chance as she was upset during her first performance. She had recently split up with her boyfriend so she wasn't in a fit state to perform. We gave her the chance to go away and compose herself. This does happen and the only reason it wasn't seen on the show was that there wasn't enough time to fit all of this into one episode."

=== Stereo Kicks ===
During The Xtra Factor after the second results show, in which Stereo Kicks took part in the sing-off, Crawford asked Walsh, their mentor, about them. He said, live on television, that he "never wanted eight boys in the band", claimed that Cowell was the one who had put them together, and generally insinuated that he wanted to cut several members from the band. During several interviews between the week 2 results and the week 3 performance, Stereo Kicks mentioned how disappointed they were that their mentor did not seem to want them, and there were rumours that the band would be split up during the week 3 live performances. These rumours turned out to be false, and Cowell made Walsh apologise to the band after their week 3 performance. Cowell also jokingly offered Stereo Kicks the opportunity to be mentored by him instead of Walsh.

Following Stereo Kicks' elimination in the quarter-final on 30 November, Walsh told Digital Spy on 3 December that he had believed they would last "two more weeks" in the competition. He stated that he would not be able to manage the group following The X Factor even if he had wanted to, since all the X Factor contestants had already signed to a management company, James Grant Management, prior to the live shows.

Stereo Kicks announced they had split up on 18 July 2015. Stereo Kicks member Reece Bibby joined a new band, New Hope Club, that November.

=== Fleur East ===
After Fleur East completed her performance in week 2, Mel B commented that East had allowed the backing vocals of the track to drown out her own, and accused her of "cheating." This caused a massive uproar backstage after the live show had ended, especially between Mel B and Cowell, East's mentor.

Also, as the semi-finals approached, the other semi-finalists, Andrea Faustini, Ben Haenow and Lauren Platt, were reported to have complained about the judges apparently setting East up to win, with a source saying "It's beginning to look obvious the judges want her to win. It may as well be called The F Factor – it's very unfair." Haenow later stated in an interview that the rumours were false, and that their mentor Cowell is not biased towards any of his acts.

=== Halloween dancers ===
During the fourth live show, Fernandez-Versini said that her act, Lola Saunders, kept to the theme of Halloween by having dancers dressed in straitjackets behind her, while performing the Gnarls Barkley song "Crazy". This caused problems to charities that help mental health suffers that felt that the performance and comments helped to normalise the stereotype that mental health sufferers are dangerous. No public apology was issued.

=== Idina Menzel and Michael Buble performance ===
During the results show of the semi-final, Idina Menzel and Michael Buble were invited to perform Baby, It's Cold Outside from Menzel's latest album. After the performance had finished Cowell and Walsh gave the duo a standing ovation while Mel B and Fernandez-Versini remained seated without applauding. Many viewers or the show and fans of the artists critiqued the judges as being "disrespectful" of the guests and ignoring common decency. The day after, Fernandez-Versini issued a statement saying that her and Mel B were too focused on their acts being in the bottom two to applaud and her dress made it difficult to stand.

=== Louis Walsh groping Mel B on live television ===
During The Xtra Factor after the semi-final results show, Mel B scolded Walsh for accidentally grabbing her bum during an interview. Visibly irritated she moved away from Walsh, who said he was only looking after her. Crawford and the other judges, Cowell and Fernandez-Versini, tried to reassure her that she was "safe" while laughing off the gesture. After resurfacing on social media in July 2018, the clip sparked outrage around the normalcy of sexual harassment. The video caused a debate among users with some defending Walsh based on his alleged homosexuality and the justification that he was unaware of what he was doing. Others pointed out if it can happen so openly in a public setting there is a correlation to how frequently it may happen behind closed doors. Walsh stated on 21 July that he grabbed Mel B's bottom as a joke, but conceded that the gesture was no longer politically correct due to social media reaction.
