= Chloe Jasmine =

English singer

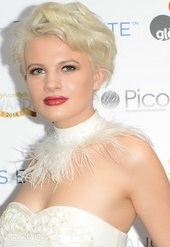
- Chloe-Jasmine at the MyFaceMyBody Awards.
- Born: Chloe-Jasmine Whichello; 1990 or 1991 (age 35–36); Eastbourne, East Sussex, England
- Occupation: Singer
- Years active: 2006–present
- Known for: The X Factor; The Face; Celebrity Big Brother

Chloe-Jasmine Whichello (born 1990 or 1991) also known as Chloe Jasmine, is an English singer best known for participating in the Sky Living modelling show The Face in 2013 where she was mentored by Naomi Campbell, and the eleventh series of The X Factor in 2014. Chloe Jasmine made it to the live shows, where she worked with Cheryl, but was eliminated in week 2 and was the fourth contestant eliminated after suffering from a broken leg. She later competed in Celebrity Big Brother in 2015.

== Career ==
=== 2014: The X Factor ===
In 2014, she advanced to the next round. For her arena audition, she performed "Why Don't You Do Right?". She progressed to bootcamp and was mentored by Cheryl. She was one of the six girls chosen for judges' houses. After her performance at judges' houses, Jasmine was put through to the live shows. In week 1, she performed Britney Spears' song "Toxic" and was saved by the public. In week 2, she performed "Fame" by Irene Cara, but this time received the fewest viewer votes and was in the bottom two against boy band Stereo Kicks. Only Cheryl opted to save Jasmine, with the other three judges saving Stereo Kicks, meaning she was the fourth contestant eliminated.

The X Factor performances and results (2014)
Stage	Song	Theme	Result
Room audition	"Black Coffee"	Free choice	Through to arena
Arena audition	"Why Don't You Do Right?"	Free choice	Through to bootcamp
Six-chair challenge (bootcamp)	"I Want It That Way"	Free choice	Through to judges' houses
Judges' houses	"Somewhere Over the Rainbow"	Free choice	Through to live shows
Live week 1	"Toxic"	Number ones	Safe (12th)
Live week 2	"Fame"	80's night	Bottom two (13th)
Live week 2	"Will You Love Me Tomorrow"	Free choice	Eliminated

=== Other appearances ===
On 29 January 2006 Jasmine appeared on Big Brother's Little Brother as part of Chantelle Houghton's fake band Kandy Floss, in a reunion special for the fourth series. After the performance, she introduced herself as "CJ from Bournemouth".

Jasmine began modelling full-time aged 17 alongside a degree and has enjoyed a limited international career, appearing on some front covers and working for companies such as Marc Jacobs, James Lakeland, Michael Spiers, Wella and L'Oréal. She continues to perform internationally.

In 2013 she placed tenth in the UK TV series The Face. On 23 October 2014, she appeared on an episode of Celebrity Juice. Jasmine has appeared on Celebrity Big Brother's Bit on the Side five times as a panellist. On 8 August 2015, Jasmine and her ex-fiancé Stevi Ritchie appeared on an episode of Keep It in the Family. Jasmine and Ritchie also appeared on an episode of Who's Doing the Dishes?.

On 27 August 2015, she and Ritchie entered the Celebrity Big Brother house to participate jointly in the sixteenth series. They finished in fifth place.

In 2018, Jasmine gigged with Ben Volpeliere-Pierrot from Curiosity Killed the Cat.

She has walked at London Fashion Week for various designers including James Clarke, Prophetik, Luna, Emre Tamer, Ilyes Ouali, Yevjac, Hellavagirl, Vin and Omi, Kolchakov Barba and Vivienne Westwood closing NK fashion week with Madeline Stuart and Norish.

She collaborated with Mattel and Chavez for a PPE demonstration.

CJ is a contributing editor for VUE-USA.

== Television ==
Year	Title	Role
2006, 2014	The X Factor	Herself/Contestant
2013	The Face	Herself/Contestant
2015	Celebrity Big Brother	Herself/Housemate
