= Starman (band) =

British band

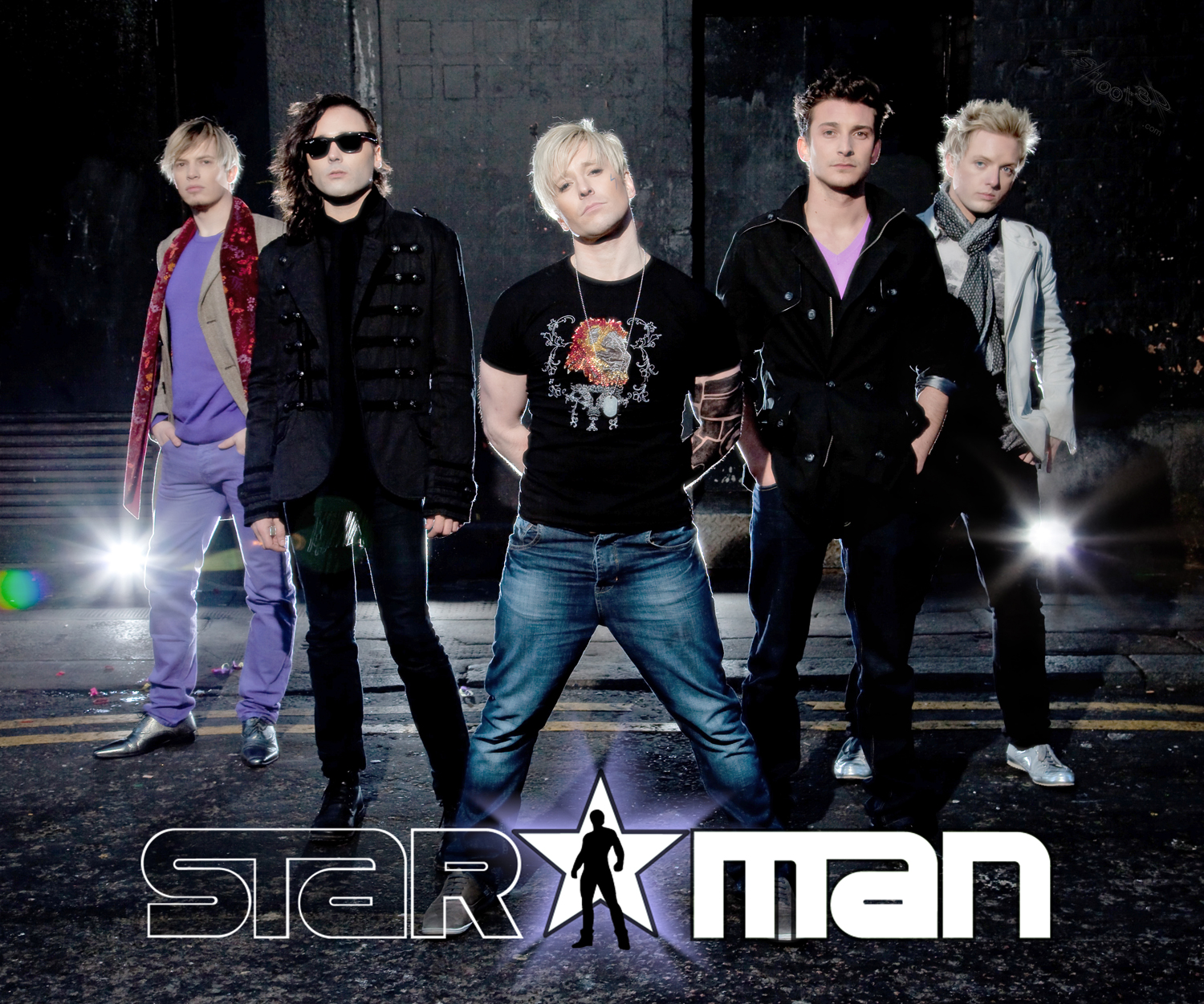

Background information
- Origin: London, England
- Genre: Pop
- Years active: 2009-2011
- Label: Unsigned
- Past members: Andrew Stone; Jesus Ruiz; Craig Custance (2009-2011); Mickey Cowdroy (2009-2011); Luka Cadez (2009-2011)
- Website: starman-music.com

Starman was a British pop band formed in 2009 by Andrew Stone, a dance teacher at London-based Pineapple Dance Studios.

== Formation and history ==
The band line-up initially consisted of Andrew Stone, Jesus Ruiz, Craig Custance, Mickey Cowdroy, Rosalee O'Connell and Luka Cadez. Starman described their music as a high-energy mix of pop and 1980s electro, with a broad range of beats, melodies and riffs.

They performed several gigs across the UK in summer 2010, including T4 on the Beach and Party in the Park.

The band featured in the Pineapple Dance Studios UK TV show, which had approximately 9.4 million viewers, and the follow-up, Louie Spence's Showbusiness, which aired in 2011. Their début single, "I Don’t Wanna Dance", was released on 26 April 2010. After being ignored by a succession of record companies and independent record labels, the second single "My Christmas Wish" (released 20 December 2010) was funded by Sky to support Louie Spence's Showbusiness.

Starman have also been made part of The Sims games franchise.

=== Departure of members ===
On 28 January 2011, after performing at the finale of Louie Spence's Showbusiness at the Wimbledon Theatre, three members of the band announced they would be leaving Starman. Luka Cadez (drums), Craig Custance (keyboards) and Michael Cowdroy (bass) have formed a new band called The Daylight Theory.

== Discography ==
=== Singles ===
==== I Don’t Wanna Dance (EP) ====
- "I Don’t Wanna Dance (Radio Edit)"
- "I Don’t Wanna Dance (Jason UFO Radio Edit)"
- "I Don’t Wanna Dance (Album Version)"
- "I Don’t Wanna Dance (Instrumental)"

==== I Don’t Wanna Dance (The Remixes) ====
- "I Don’t Wanna Dance (Album Version)"
- "I Don’t Wanna Dance (Jason UFO Club Mix)"
- "I Don’t Wanna Dance (Mark Zomerset Club Mix)"
- "I Don’t Wanna Dance (Dave Watkins Remix)"
- "I Don’t Wanna Dance (Audio Phonics Vs Sliding Doors)"
- "I Don’t Wanna Dance (Fred Portelli Vocal Mix)"

==== My Christmas Wish (EP) ====
- "My Christmas Wish (Radio Edit)"
- "My Christmas Wish (Album Version)"
- "My Christmas Wish (Instrumental)"
- "My Christmas Wish (Acapella)"
