= Big Brother (British TV series) series 18 =

Big Brother
- Series 18
- Series eighteen logo
- Presented by: Emma Willis
- No. of days: 54
- No. of housemates: 22
- Winner: Isabelle Warburton
- Runner-up: Raph Korine
- Second chance winner: Andrew Cruickshanks
- Companion shows: Big Brother's Bit on the Side
- No. of episodes: 54

Release
- Original network: Channel 5
- Original release: 5 June – 28 July 2017

Series chronology
- ← Previous; Series 17 Next → Series 19

Big Brother 2017, also known as Big Brother 18 and The United Kingdom of Big Brother, is the eighteenth series of the British reality television series Big Brother, hosted by Emma Willis and narrated by Marcus Bentley. The series launched on 5 June 2017 on Channel 5, and ended after 54 days on 28 July 2017. Rylan Clark-Neal continues to present the spin-off show Big Brother's Bit on the Side. The series, along with its spin-off, continues to air on 3e in Ireland, as part of a three-year deal between the Irish broadcaster and Endemol Shine Group. It is the seventh regular series and the nineteenth series of Big Brother in total to air on Channel 5 to date. The series received a 1.24 million average.

On Day 7, Arthur Fulford left the house for unexplained reasons. Sukhvinder Javeed also became the first housemate to voluntarily walk from the house through the front door during her husband Imran's eviction on Day 12. Kayleigh Morris and Lotan Carter were also removed from the house on Day 13 and Day 21 respectively for aggressive behaviour.

On 28 July 2017, Isabelle Warburton was announced as the winner of the series, having received 52.71% of the final vote, with Raph Korine as the runner-up after receiving 22.02%.

== Housemates ==
On 2 June 2017, Channel 5 released the identities of the first six housemates. The remaining 10 housemates were confirmed as they entered the house on 5 June 2017. Some housemates had pre-existing relationships, but their relationship had no impact on the format of the game and those with such relationships were still individual housemates - the pre-existing relationship include sisters Deborah and Hannah, husband and wife Imran and Sukhvinder, mother and daughter Mandy and Charlotte, and colleagues Kieran and Rebecca.

On 19 June 2017, it was confirmed that three potentially new housemates will enter for a task, and that the housemates would get to choose two of them to become official housemates. The three hopefuls were Isabelle Warburton, Sam Chaloner and Savannah O'Reilly. Isabelle and Savannah were ultimately chosen by Chanelle, Kieran and Lotan to join the housemates.

On 28 June 2017, it was announced that four new housemates would be entering the Big Brother house. These included the three hopefuls Andrew, Simone and Sue from the "People's Housemate" twist from launch night, as well as Sam, who entered during a dating task on Day 16. These four entered the house on Day 25 as "Second Chance" housemates, but were not eligible to win. Instead they were given £15,000 from the prize fund, which will only be given to the "Second Chance" housemate who goes the furthest in the series.

With 22 housemates, this series had the largest number of housemates since the show's move to Channel 5.

Name	Age on entry	Hometown	Day entered	Day exited	Result
Isabelle Warburton	21	Warrington	16	54	Winner
Raphael "Raph" Korine	22	Exeter (originally from the United States)	1	54	Runner-up
Deborah Agboola	25	London	1	54	3rd place
Thomas "Tom" Barber	21	Swansea	1	54	4th place
Kieran Lee	25	Lancashire	1	52	Evicted
Hannah Agboola	23	London	1	52	Evicted
Charlotte Keys	24	Doncaster	1	50	Evicted
Ellie Young	23	Castleford	1	47	Evicted
Chanelle McCleary	24	Manchester	1	47	Evicted
Joseph "Joe" Quaranta	56	London	1	33	Evicted
Savannah O'Reilly	26	Dublin	16	25	Evicted
Lotan Carter	28	Essex	1	21	Ejected
Rebecca Jane Sutton	32	Clitheroe	1	18	Evicted
Kayleigh Morris	28	Port Talbot	1	13	Ejected
Sukhvinder Javeed	38	Leeds	1	12	Walked
Imran Javeed	39	Leeds	1	12	Evicted
Arthur Fulford	24	Exeter	1	7	Walked
Amanda "Mandy" Longworth	51	Doncaster	1	5	Evicted

=== Second-chance housemates ===
On launch night, Andrew, Simone and Sue failed to win the public vote to become the People's Housemate. On Day 16, Sam was not selected to become a housemate during Blind Date task. On Day 25, Andrew, Sam, Simone and Sue entered the house as Second-Chance Housemates, they competed for a different prize of £15,000.

Name	Age on entry	Hometown	Day entered	Day exited	Result
Andrew Cruickshanks	25	Glasgow	25	54	Second Chance Winner
Sam Chaloner	24	Derbyshire	25	47	Evicted
Susan "Sue" Evans	48	Bedfordshire	25	40	Evicted
Simone Reed	28	Teesside	25	40	Evicted

== House guests ==
On 12 June 2017, it was confirmed that celebrities would be entering the house for the next shopping task. It was revealed that these would be VIP guests, and for the housemates to win a luxury shopping budget they would have to cater to the VIP's every needs.

Name	Big Brother history		Day entered	Day exited	Reason
Name	Series	Status	Day entered	Day exited	Reason
Gemma Collins	Celebrity Big Brother 17	Evicted	9	12	VIP guests during a shopping task
Marnie Simpson	Celebrity Big Brother 18	Fourth place	9	12	VIP guests during a shopping task
Nicola McLean	Celebrity Big Brother 9	Evicted	9	12	VIP guests during a shopping task
Nicola McLean	Celebrity Big Brother 19	Fifth place	9	12	VIP guests during a shopping task
Josie Gibson	Big Brother 11	Winner	43		Briefly entered to give Raph advice after he took £150 from "The Steal"
Josie Gibson	Ultimate Big Brother	Walked	43		Briefly entered to give Raph advice after he took £150 from "The Steal"
Chanelle McCleary	Big Brother 18	Evicted	51		Briefly returned for Deborah and Kieran's "wedding".
Daniel Larson	Big Brother 18	Evicted	51		Briefly returned for Deborah and Kieran's "wedding".
Rebecca Jane	Big Brother 18	Evicted	51		Briefly returned for Deborah and Kieran's "wedding".
Sue Evans	Big Brother 18	Evicted	51		Briefly returned for Deborah and Kieran's "wedding".
Sukhvinder Javeed	Big Brother 18	Walked	51		Briefly returned for Deborah and Kieran's "wedding".

== Nominations table ==
	Week 1	Week 2	Week 3	Week 4	Week 5	Week 6	Week 7			Week 8			Nominations received
	Week 1	Week 2	Week 3	Week 4	Week 5	Week 6	Day 44	Day 45	Day 47	Day 48	Final Day 54		Nominations received
Main Housemates
Isabelle	Not in House			~~Lotan,~~; ~~Tom~~	Not eligible	No nominations	Not eligible	Tom, Kieran	Tom	Not eligible	Winner (Day 54)		11
Raph	Exile; Housemate	Joe, Kayleigh	Tom, Joe	~~Tom,~~; ~~Joe~~	Joe, Ellie	No nominations	Not eligible	Ellie, Kieran	Kieran	Not eligible	Runner-up (Day 54)		5
Deborah	Citizen; Housemate	Rebecca, Kayleigh	Joe, Tom	~~Lotan,~~; ~~Tom~~	Tom, Joe	No nominations	Not eligible	Ellie, Tom	Tom	Not eligible	Third place (Day 54)		2
Tom	People's; Housemate	Sukhvinder, Imran	Rebecca, Hannah	~~Isabelle,~~; ~~Unknown~~	Not eligible	No nominations	Not eligible	Chanelle, Isabelle	Hannah	Isabelle	Fourth place (Day 54)		14
Kieran	Citizen; Housemate	Sukhvinder, Charlotte	Joe, Chanelle	~~Hannah,~~; ~~Isabelle~~	Not eligible	No nominations	Not eligible	Chanelle, Raph	Isabelle	Not eligible	Evicted (Day 52)		5
Hannah	Citizen; Housemate	Rebecca, Kayleigh	Joe, Rebecca	~~Lotan,~~; ~~Unknown~~	Tom, Charlotte	No nominations	Not eligible	Ellie, Tom	Kieran	Charlotte	Evicted (Day 52)		16
Charlotte	Citizen; Housemate	Joe, Imran	Joe, Chanelle	~~Hannah,~~; ~~Isabelle~~	Not eligible	No nominations	Not eligible	Chanelle, Raph	Hannah	Not eligible	Evicted (Day 50)		9
Ellie	Citizen; Housemate	Charlotte, Sukhvinder	Joe, Rebecca	~~Isabelle,~~; ~~Unknown~~	Raph, Hannah	No nominations	Not eligible	Hannah, Chanelle	Evicted (Day 47)				5
Chanelle	Exile; Housemate	Rebecca, Sukhvinder	Joe, Rebecca	~~Lotan,~~; ~~Joe~~	Not eligible	No nominations	Not eligible	Charlotte, Kieran	Evicted (Day 47)				9
Joe	Citizen; Housemate	Raph, Rebecca, Charlotte	Rebecca, Charlotte	~~Isabelle,~~; ~~Unknown~~	Not eligible	Evicted (Day 33)							15
Savannah	Not in House			~~Hannah,~~; ~~Isabelle~~	Evicted (Day 25)								0
Lotan	Exile; Housemate	Hannah, Sukhvinder	Hannah, Chanelle	~~Hannah,~~; ~~Isabelle~~	Ejected (Day 21)								4
Rebecca	Exile; Housemate	Sukhvinder, Imran	Joe, Hannah	Evicted (Day 18)									11
Kayleigh	Citizen; Housemate	Imran, Deborah	Ejected (Day 13)										4
Sukhvinder	Exile; Housemate	Kayleigh, Rebecca	Walked (Day 12)										6
Imran	Exile; Housemate	Rebecca, Ellie	Evicted (Day 12)										4
Arthur	Exile; Housemate	Walked (Day 7)											N/A
Mandy	Exile; Housemate	Evicted (Day 5)											N/A
Second Chance Housemates
Andrew	Not in House				Joe, Tom	No nominations	Sam	Hannah, Chanelle	Hannah	Not eligible	Second Chance Winner (Day 54)		N/A
Sam	Not in House				Charlotte, Deborah	No nominations	Not eligible	Chanelle, Hannah	Evicted (Day 47)				N/A
Sue	Not in House				Charlotte, Tom	No nominations	Evicted (Day 40)						N/A
Simone	Not in House				Hannah, Raph	No nominations	Evicted (Day 40)						N/A
Notes	1, 2	3	4	5, 6, 7	8	9, 10	11	none	12		13		
Against public vote	Arthur, Chanelle, Imran, Lotan, Mandy, Raph, Rebecca, Sukhvinder	Charlotte, Imran, Kayleigh, Raph, Rebecca, Sukhvinder	Chanelle, Hannah, Joe, Rebecca	Chanelle, Charlotte, Deborah, Ellie, Hannah, Isabelle, Joe, Kieran, Raph, Savannah, Tom	Charlotte, Joe, Tom	Chanelle, Isabelle, Simone, Sue	none	Chanelle, Ellie, Hannah, Kieran, Tom	none	Charlotte, Isabelle	Deborah, Hannah, Isabelle, Kieran, Raph, Tom		
Walked	none	Arthur, Sukhvinder	none										
Ejected	none		Kayleigh	Lotan	none								
Evicted	Mandy; Tom's choice (out of 2) to evict	Imran; Fewest votes to save	Rebecca; Fewest votes to save	Savannah; 36.32% to evict	Joe; Most votes to evict	Simone; Most votes to evict	Sam; Andrew's choice to evict	Chanelle; Most votes to evict	Hannah; 3 of 8 votes to evict	Charlotte; Most votes to evict	Hannah; 0.59% (out of 6)	Deborah; 14.02% (out of 3)	
Evicted	Mandy; Tom's choice (out of 2) to evict	Imran; Fewest votes to save	Rebecca; Fewest votes to save	Savannah; 36.32% to evict	Joe; Most votes to evict	Simone; Most votes to evict	Sam; Andrew's choice to evict	Chanelle; Most votes to evict	Hannah; 3 of 8 votes to evict	Charlotte; Most votes to evict	Kieran; 1.32% (out of 6)	Deborah; 14.02% (out of 3)	
Evicted	Mandy; Tom's choice (out of 2) to evict	Imran; Fewest votes to save	Rebecca; Fewest votes to save	Savannah; 36.32% to evict	Joe; Most votes to evict	Simone; Most votes to evict	Sam; Andrew's choice to evict	Chanelle; Most votes to evict	Hannah; 3 of 8 votes to evict	Charlotte; Most votes to evict	Kieran; 1.32% (out of 6)	Raph; 22.02% (out of 2)	
Evicted	Mandy; Tom's choice (out of 2) to evict	Imran; Fewest votes to save	Rebecca; Fewest votes to save	Savannah; 36.32% to evict	Joe; Most votes to evict	Sue; 1 of 10 votes (out of 2) to save	Sam; Andrew's choice to evict	Ellie; Second most votes to evict	Tom; 2 of 8 votes to evict	Charlotte; Most votes to evict	Tom; 9.34% (out of 4)	Raph; 22.02% (out of 2)	
Evicted	Mandy; Tom's choice (out of 2) to evict	Imran; Fewest votes to save	Rebecca; Fewest votes to save	Savannah; 36.32% to evict	Joe; Most votes to evict	Sue; 1 of 10 votes (out of 2) to save	Sam; Andrew's choice to evict	Ellie; Second most votes to evict	Tom; 2 of 8 votes to evict	Charlotte; Most votes to evict	Isabelle; 52.71% to win		

Notes

- ^Note 1: On Day 1, shortly after entering the house "People's Housemate" Tom was asked to reward citizenship to half of his housemates, therefore exiling the remaining. He chose to exile Arthur, Chanelle, Charlotte, Hannah, Lotan, Raph, Rebecca and Sukhvinder. The housemates with exile status were told that their place in the house was at risk. On Day 3, Tom was given the chance to finalise his decision - and therefore swapped Charlotte with Mandy, and Hannah with Imran. The housemates left exiled faced the viewer vote for the first eviction.
- ^Note 2: On Day 5, it was revealed that Imran and Mandy received the fewest votes to save. Tom then got to decide which one got evicted. He chose Mandy.
- ^Note 3: On Day 7, during a task, Joe was given the punishment of giving a killer nomination. He chose Raph, therefore automatically putting him up for eviction.
- ^Note 4: On Day 12, the VIP house guests were each allowed to grant one housemate immunity. They chose Lotan, Kieran and Raph.
- ^Note 5: Although every housemate gave two nominations, as usual, Chanelle's, Ellie's, Hannah's, Joe's, Raph's, and Tom's second nominations were not revealed.
- ^Note 6: Hannah, Isabelle, Lotan and Tom received the most nominations this week. However, on Day 21, as a punishment for the housemate's behaviour, Big Brother voided all nominations and put them all up for eviction.
- ^Note 7: Throughout the week of this week's eviction, the voting figures were released on Big Brother's Bit on the Side allowing the public to know which housemates were, at the time in danger of being evicted. After the eviction, the final voting figures were released too, showing that Savannah was evicted with 36.32% with the most votes, followed by Isabelle with 26.95%, and Hannah with 11.9%. Behind her was Tom with 6.99%, Chanelle on 4.71%, Ellie with 3.26% and Joe not far behind on 3.22%. Charlotte also received just 2.35%, Deborah got 1.92%, Kieran had 1.57%, whilst Raph received the fewest with just 0.8%.
- ^Note 8: On Day 25, it was revealed that the "Second Chance" housemates were immune and were automatically given the power to nominate. The other housemates had to earn the right to nominate via tasks. Hannah and Deborah earned this on Day 26. On Day 27, Raph and Ellie also earned the right to nominate.
- ^Note 9: There were no nominations this week. Instead, starting on Day 37, the housemates took part in "The Hunt" - a series of challenges where the losers risked facing eviction. Chanelle became the first nominated housemate after being randomly targeted in the first challenge. Simone became the second nominated after being targeted by her fellow housemates in the second challenge. The third challenge claimed Isabelle as its victim after choosing herself to face eviction between her and Sam. Sue fell victim to the fourth challenge after being targeted by Chanelle, Isabelle and Simone.
- ^Note 10: As Simone had the most votes to evict, she was evicted out of the backdoor in the early hours of Day 40. Later that day, Emma entered the house announcing that Isabelle had the fewest votes and was safe, whilst housemates had to choose to save either Chanelle or Sue. With only one out of ten housemates saving Sue, she was evicted.
- ^Note 11: From Day 41, housemates competed in teams in "The Steal", stealing money from the prize fund. Members of the winning team will be faced with a dilemma to steal all of the stolen money for themselves, but in doing this would have to evict a housemate. As Andrew pressed the buzzer the fastest, he won the £18,900 and the eviction of a housemate of his choice. He chose to evict Sam on Day 44 however he will not leave the house until Day 47. Even though Sam lost his housemates status on Day 44 he was still eligible to nominate on Day 45. Owing to Sam's eviction, Andrew also became the highest placing Second Chance Housemate and won £15,000 and could stay until the final, even though he is not eligible to win.
- ^Note 12: On Day 47, housemates nominated face to face for what they thought was an immediate backdoor eviction. They chose Hannah and Tom. As Tom and Kieran were tied with two votes each, the result went down to the previous public vote, where Tom was ultimately chosen. The two housemates were then told they had been fake evicted and moved to The Attic, where they were able to spy on their fellow housemates and ultimately decide which two would face the final eviction. They chose Charlotte and Isabelle. Charlotte received the most public votes and was evicted through the backdoor on Day 50.
- ^Note 13: For the final week the public were voting for who they wanted to win, rather than to evict. On Day 52, the voting lines froze, and the two housemates with the fewest votes to win - Hannah and Kieran - were evicted through the backdoor. The voting percentages reflect the overall share of the final vote, and do not account for vote freezes; Isabelle won with 70.53% of the vote over Raph.

== Weekly summary ==
The main events in the Big Brother 18 house are summarised in the table below. A typical week begins with nominations, followed by the shopping task, and then the eviction of a Housemate during the live Friday or Thursday episode. Evictions, tasks, and other events for a particular week are noted in order of sequence.

Week 1	Entrances	On Day 1, Arthur, Ellie, Lotan, Imran, Sukhvinder, Charlotte, Mandy, Deborah, Hannah, Joe, Kieran, Rebecca, Kayleigh, Raph, Chanelle and Tom entered the house.
Week 1	Twists	On Day 1, the public voted for their "People's Housemate" out of Andrew, Simone, Sue and Tom. They chose Tom, who entered the house as the final housemate. As the People's Housemate, the viewers can control Tom's decisions in the house. Tom's first mission was to exile some of his housemates. To help him make this decision, he took part in a live Facebook web chat with the public. He then chose to exile Arthur, Chanelle, Charlotte, Hannah, Lotan, Raph, Rebecca and Sukhvinder., and therefore granted the remaining housemates with citizenship.; On Day 3, Tom was allowed to swap some citizen housemates with exile housemates. He swapped Charlotte with Mandy, and Hannah with Imran. At the end of this, all exile housemates faced the first eviction.; On Day 5, after it was revealed that Imran and Mandy received the fewest votes during the eviction, Tom was forced to choose one of them to evict. He chose Mandy.
Week 1	Tasks	On Day 2, Tom was given a choice of rules suggested by the public to set the exiled housemates. He had to pick three of these rules for them to follow.; On Day 2, housemates guessed which headlines about each other were real and which were fake news.; On Day 3, Tom put the exile housemates on the spot with a personality trait and asked them to prove themselves.; On Day 4, housemates participated in several debates, with the Exiles and Citizens going head-to-head. Housemates then participated in a mock version of the simultaneous general election.
Week 1	Exits	On Day 5, Mandy became the first housemate to be evicted after being evicted by Tom. (See twists)
Week 2	Tasks	On Day 6, Tom entered the "Intelligence Centre" for the final time believing he was still the "People's Housemate" and that he was interacting with the public and answering their questions. In fact he was answering questions set by his fellow housemates who were watching from the main house.; On Day 7, the housemates took part in a quiz with a twist. They each selected a gift at random without knowing that the gift actually contained a punishment. If they answered their question correctly they would get to choose a housemate to give the punishment to, however if they answered incorrectly they would receive the punishment themselves.; On Day 9, the housemates took part in their first shopping task where Sukhvinder became mayor of the village with Kayleigh as deputy. They then assigned job roles to the other housemates, but left some unemployed. Gemma Collins, Marnie Simpson and Nicola McLean entered as guests in the village, and the employed housemates had to cater to their every needs. Sukhvinder was able to fire or replace any employees who she didn't feel was up to the job. Any housemate left unemployed at the end of the task would miss out on the luxury shopping budget.; On Day 12, the VIP guests each led a team of housemates in a series of summer party games
Week 2	Nominations	On Day 7, during a task, Joe was given the punishment of giving a killer nomination. He chose Raph, therefore automatically putting him up for eviction.; On Day 8, housemates nominated for the first time. Charlotte, Imran, Kayleigh, Rebecca, and Sukhvinder received the most nominations and joined Raph in facing eviction.
Week 2	Exits	On Day 7, Arthur left the house for unexplained reasons.; On Day 12, Imran became the second housemate to be evicted.; On Day 12, Sukhvinder walked from the house during her husband Imran's eviction.
Week 2	Punishments	On Day 8, Chanelle received a formal warning for her provocative behaviour towards Kieran.
Week 3	Exits	On Day 13, Kayleigh was removed from the house due to multiple threats of violence and threatening behaviour.; On Day 18, Rebecca became the third housemate to be evicted.
Week 3	Punishments	On Day 13, Chanelle received a formal and final warning for her aggressive behaviour towards Kayleigh.; On Day 13, as punishment for discussing nominations, Ellie and Tom were sent to jail.
Week 3	Tasks	On Day 13, Raph took part in many challenges to win himself a birthday party.; On Day 14, Chanelle and Kieran were given a secret task to hide several gnomes around the house, that one by one increased in size over the duration of the task. Unbeknownst to them, the other housemates, led by Rebecca, had a secret task to return the gnomes to the Diary Room.; On Day 16, Chanelle, Lotan and Kieran took part in a Blind Date themed task where they asked questions to anonymous potential housemates Isabelle, Sam and Savannah. At the end of the task they chose Isabelle and Savannah to become housemates.; On Day 17, housemates began their second shopping task, where they each had to enter the "Den of Dilemma" where they were given a difficult choice that could have affected themselves or the other housemates.
Week 3	Nominations	On Day 15, housemates nominated for the second time. As Kieran, Lotan and Raph had been granted immunity by the VIP guests, they could not be nominated. Chanelle, Hannah, Joe and Rebecca received the most nominations and therefore face the third eviction.
Week 3	Entrances	On Day 16, Isabelle and Savannah entered the house. (see tasks)
Week 4	Tasks	On Day 19, housemates went head-to-head in a task to prove who was the best at a particular skill.; On Day 21, the housemates began their next shopping task in which all housemates had to act like hippies and promote peace and love in the house. They had to ensure that they chanted when the gong sounded and at least two housemates needed to touch the "Tree of Love" at all times. The task continued on Day 22 and 23. However, due to some housemates failing to stick to the rules of the task, they failed.
Week 4	Nominations	On Day 20, housemates nominated for the third time. Hannah, Isabelle, Lotan and Tom received the most nominations and therefore face eviction this week. However these were then void on Day 21. (see punishments)
Week 4	Punishments	On Day 20, Tom was given a formal and final warning for his behaviour.; On Day 21, due to Lotan's removal from the house and the housemates unacceptable behaviour, nominations were void and all housemates face eviction this week.; On Day 21, Deborah was given a formal warning for her aggressive behaviour the night before.
Week 4	Exits	On Day 21, Lotan was removed from the house for aggressive behaviour.; On Day 25, Savannah became the fourth housemate to be evicted.
Week 4	Entrances	On Day 25, Andrew, Sam, Simone and Sue entered the house as "Second Chance Housemates". This meant that they were not eligible to win, however, the one out of these four who goes the furthest in the series will take £15,000 from the prize fund.
Week 5
Week 5	Nominations	On Day 25, as new housemates, Andrew, Sam, Simone and Sue were told they were immune from nominations, but would still be nominating. The other housemates were told they would have to earn their right to nominate. Over Day 26 and Day 27, Hannah, Deborah, Raph and Ellie earned this right and time in "The Void" where they could discuss nominations.; On Day 28, the housemates that were eligible to, nominated. Later that day, the nominations were broadcast to the house. Charlotte, Joe and Tom received the most nominations and therefore face the fifth eviction.
Week 5	Punishments	On Day 29, as punishment for Ellie discussing nominations and Tom refusing to listen to Big Brother's instructions, electrical appliances and hot water were turned off, and the fake tan was taken away.; On Day 32, Tom was sent to jail for drunkenly kicking in a door the previous night.
Week 5	Tasks	On Day 29, the housemates began their next shopping task. They each had to enter the "Survival Room" and endure a challenge. To pass, they just had to remain in the room during each challenge. They passed the task on Day 31.
Week 5	Exits	On Day 33, Joe became the fifth housemate to be evicted.
Week 6
Week 6	Tasks	On Day 34, Chanelle, Deborah and Ellie competed in a beauty pageant. Deborah won the "BBUK Queen" title.; On Day 35, the housemates began their next shopping task. Each housemate had to enter "The Light", where they were given the choice of remaining loyal to their housemates in an attempt to pass the task, or to occur a fail by having contact with a loved one. To pass, they had to keep the lightbulb lit. It lost power as long as housemates had contact with loved ones, but gained power when housemates danced on the dance floor. As all of the power drained, the housemates failed the task.; On Day 37, housemates began "The Hunt". (see nominations); On Day 40, housemates made "How to..." videos based on the character trait that was voted as most suitable to them.
Week 6	Nominations	On Day 37, the housemates began "The Hunt" - a series of games instead of nominations where the losers faced the next eviction. That day, Chanelle became the first victim, and Simone became the second. This continued on Day 38, where Isabelle and Sue became the third and fourth victims respectively.
Week 6	Twist	On Day 40, in the early hours, the nominated housemates entered the woods for the next part of "The Hunt". Here it was revealed that Simone had received the most votes to evict and was evicted via the backdoor.; On Day 40, it was announced that Sue and Chanelle had received the second and third highest votes in the eviction, but it was down to the remaining housemates to decide which of them should be saved, and therefore which should be evicted. With the fewest votes to save, Sue was evicted.
Week 6	Exits	On Day 40, in the early hours, Simone became the sixth housemate to be evicted via the backdoor.; On Day 40, Sue became the seventh housemate to be evicted.
Week 7
Week 7	Tasks	On Day 42, housemates began "The Steal", where they competed in two teams to steal £20,000 from the winner's prize fund. The teams competed in challenges for money towards their team's jackpot. This continued into Day 43, where both Raph and Kieran were banned from competing by the opposing team. The Gold team eventually won on Day 44 and were given an opportunity to steal the £18,900 accumulated. Andrew pressed his buzzer first and won the money as well as evicting Sam.; On Day 46, in order to get a surprise birthday party for Chanelle, all housemates had to ignore that it was her birthday during the day. They passed this task.
Week 7	Exits	On Day 44, Sam became the eighth housemate to be evicted but remained in the house and participated in tasks and nominations until Day 47.; On Day 47, Chanelle and Ellie became the ninth housemate and tenth housemates to be evicted.
Week 7	Nominations	On Day 45, housemates nominated for the final time. Chanelle, Ellie, Hannah, Kieran and Tom received the most nominations and face this week's double eviction. After nominations, they were forced to wear a T-shirt with the reasons for the other housemates nominating them written on them.
Week 7	Twists	On Day 47, Hannah and Tom were evicted by their fellow housemates. However unbeknownst to them, this eviction was fake and they were actually sent to The Attic where they were able to spy on their fellow housemates.
Week 8
Week 8	Tasks	On Day 48, from The Attic, Hannah and Tom had to choose who they believed to be the four most boring housemates to star in a talent show. They chose Charlotte, Isabelle, Kieran and Raph, who then had to perform.; On Day 50, the housemates took part in many tasks surrounding the stages of life. The task continued into Day 51, where Chanelle, Imran, Rebecca, Sue and Sukhvinder all made brief returns to the house for Deborah and Kieran's fake wedding and eventual divorce.; On Day 52, for the final part of the stages of life task, housemates faced their destiny; Heaven or Hell. As Hannah and Kieran received the fewest votes to win, they were sent to hell and were therefore evicted through the backdoor. All the remaining housemates were sent to heaven and earned a place in the final.
Week 8	Nominations	On Day 48, from inside The Attic, Hannah and Tom chose Charlotte and Isabelle to face the final eviction.
Week 8	Exits	On Day 50, Charlotte became the eleventh housemate to be evicted, leaving through the backdoor.; On Day 52, Hannah and Kieran became the twelfth and thirteenth housemates to be evicted, leaving through the backdoor.; On Day 54, Andrew left the house with £33,900 as the winning second chance housemate. Tom left in fourth place whilst Deborah finished in third. Isabelle was then announced as the winner, leaving Raph in second place.

=== The People's Housemate ===
As part of the launch night twist, the viewers were able to vote a final housemate into the house. This housemate would become the People's Housemate and would have great power over the house, including regular contact with the outside world. Tom was chosen over Andrew, Sue and Simone to become the People's Housemate.

- On Day 1, Tom was told he would have to exile some of the housemates. To help him make this decision he took part in a live Facebook web chat. He chose to exile Arthur, Chanelle, Charlotte, Hannah, Lotan, Raph, Rebecca and Sukhvinder, and therefore made the remaining housemates Citizens. Exiled housemates were forced to live in the grotty Thorn Cottage, had to abide by Citizens rules and all faced the first eviction.
- On Day 2, the public voted for rules for the exiled housemates to follow. Out of a selection, Tom then narrowed these down to three. These included making the Exiled housemates bow every time a Citizen entered the room, for Exiles to make Citizens food and drinks when requested and for Exiles to disclose all private conversations.
- On Day 3, after a live link-up on Big Brother's Bit on the Side listening to viewers opinions, Tom made his final decisions on whom to grant citizenship to and whom to exile. He swapped Charlotte with Mandy, and Hannah with Imran. The remaining exile housemates then faced the first eviction.
- On Day 5, after it was revealed that Imran and Mandy received the fewest votes during the eviction, Tom had to choose one of them to evict. He chose Mandy. This was his final decision as "People's Housemate" as afterwards he received regular housemate status.

== Production ==
=== Eye logo ===
The eye was released on 11 May 2017 and is formed with a multi-coloured Union Jack flag and features a patchwork of eclectic images representing modern Britain.

=== Teasers ===
On 12 May 2017, a short 5-second teaser trailer was released on Channel 5. On 20 May 2017 the first full trailer for the series was released. The trailer depicts various locations around Britain and is narrated by several different voices, as well as featuring distorted Union Jack-style graphics first used in the earlier 5-second teaser. It also includes clues on the identity of the housemates. On 27 May 2017, a third trailer was released, this time with blurred snippets of possible housemates, and teasing that this year Big Brother will be getting "extremely revealing." On 2 June, Channel 5 released images of 6 of the new housemates via Instagram and Snapchat.

=== House ===
House pictures were released on 31 May 2017; the House followed the theme of a "Big Brother Village". For the first time since Big Brother 11, the living room and the kitchen-dining room were separate. The kitchen was modelled after a bakery accompanied by four dining tables, each with four chairs. For part of the season, the chair at the centre of the Kenny/Shiells altercation was used as the diary room chair. Also, for the first time since Celebrity Big Brother 6, there were two bedrooms. The first bedroom, known as Rose Cottage, was luxurious while the second bedroom, referred to as Thorn Cottage, was grotty and rundown in comparison. The bathroom was mostly pink and featured the decor of a salon, with windows looking out towards the garden.

== Ratings ==
Official ratings are taken from BARB.

	Viewers (millions)							
	Week 1	Week 2	Week 3	Week 4	Week 5	Week 6	Week 7	Week 8
Saturday		1.30	1.16	1.15	1.18	1.09	1.05	1.29
Sunday		1.45	1.27	1.30	1.10	1.17	1.04	1.08
Monday	1.60	1.46	1.32	1.23	1.21	1.17	1.12	1.03
Tuesday	1.53	1.27	1.19	1.14	1.20	1.20	1.28	1.05
Wednesday	1.56	1.42	1.28	1.22	1.13	1.22	1.27	1.10
Thursday	1.60	1.33	1.15	1.20	1.20	1.24	1.23	1.02
Friday	1.43	1.27	1.15	1.08	1.12	1.17	1.24	1.11
Weekly average	1.54	1.36	1.21	1.19	1.18	1.18	1.18	1.10
Running average	1.54	1.45	1.37	1.32	1.30	1.28	1.26	1.24
Series average	1.24							

== Controversy ==
On Day 12, during a hostile discussion between Chanelle and Kayleigh, Chanelle knocked Kayleigh’s drink off the table in her direction, which enraged Kayleigh to the point where she made threats of physical violence, which continued after being called to the Diary Room to calm down. The following day she was removed from the house because of her threatening behaviour. Chanelle was also given a formal warning for her behaviour.

On Day 20, housemates were given a task in which they had to put different labels with personality traits on the housemate which they thought suited them best. During the task, Lotan started bullying Isabelle and she said that he was a bad role model to his son, in a response to Lotan's insults towards her. This caused Lotan to get angry and throw his drink across the room, covering a few housemates which enraged Chanelle and Hannah. He then walked upstairs to the Diary Room with Tom to calm down, with many arguments taking place in the house. Lotan then broke out of the Diary Room and returned to the house and was called back in several times, but refused. When returning to the Diary Room, Hannah and Deborah attempted to confront Lotan, as Ellie and Charlotte tried to intervene, which at this point security was sent into the house to defuse the situation. Ellie deliberately tried to provoke Hannah and Deborah into hitting her, all whilst being held back by Charlotte. She carried on this behaviour at the top of the stairs, screaming wildly. Deborah proceeded to run up the stairs to confront Ellie, as Ellie continued to provoke her by telling Hannah and Deborah repeatedly 'hit me'. Despite this Ellie received no formal warnings. Deborah then threatened to leave, but after a discussion with her sister Hannah, decided to stay. The next day it was revealed that Lotan had been removed from the house due to his threatening behaviour and comments made about housemate Isabelle.
