= Celebrity Big Brother (British TV series) series 9 =

Coordinates: 51°39′23″N 0°16′02″W

Celebrity Big Brother
- Series 9
- Series nine logo
- Presented by: Brian Dowling
- No. of days: 23
- No. of housemates: 12
- Winner: Denise Welch
- Runner-up: Frankie Cocozza
- Companion shows: Big Brother's Bit on the Side
- No. of episodes: 25

Release
- Original network: Channel 5
- Original release: 5 January – 27 January 2012

Series chronology
- ← Previous; Series 8 Next → Series 10

Celebrity Big Brother 2012, also known as Celebrity Big Brother 9, is the ninth series of the British reality television series Celebrity Big Brother. It began on 5 January 2012 and ended on 27 January 2012. It was the second Celebrity series to air on Channel 5 as part of the channel's then two-year contract with the show and the ninth series of the show to air overall. The series was sponsored by Plusnet. This was the first of two series of Celebrity Big Brother to air in 2012.

The series was won by actress and television presenter Denise Welch.

Nicola McLean returned to the house for Celebrity Big Brother 19 as an All-Star, representing this series. She left the house in fifth place.

== Format ==
Celebrity Big Brother is a game show in which a group of celebrity contestants, referred to as housemates, live in isolation from the outside world in a custom built "house", constantly under video surveillance. During their time in the House, the housemates are required to nominate two of their fellow contestants for potential eviction, and the two or more with the most votes would be nominated. This process is mandatory for all housemates, and failure to comply could result in expulsion from the House. The public then vote, with one of those celebrities evicted from the house. When the final week arrives, the viewers vote for which of the remaining celebrities should win the series, and the housemate with the most votes becomes the winner.

During their time in the House, housemates are given weekly tasks to perform. The housemates wager a portion of their weekly shopping budget on the task, and either win double their wagered fund or lose the wagered fund depending on their performance in the task. The housemates are required to work as a group to complete their tasks, with the format of the tasks varying based on the number of remaining housemates. Throughout the series, some housemates have been given secret tasks that must either be completed individually or with a small group; failure to do so can result in the housemate being nominated or punished in the House. Should the housemates run out of the food provided for them, an emergency ration was available to them. The housemates are forbidden from discussing nominations, and doing so could result in punishment. The format of the series is mainly seen as a social experiment, and requires housemates to interact with others who may have differing ideals, beliefs, and prejudices. Housemates are also required to make visits to the Diary Room during their stay in the House, where they are able to share their thoughts and feelings on their fellow housemates and the game.

== Housemates ==
| Celebrity | Age on entry | Notability | Day entered | Day exited | Status |
|---|---|---|---|---|---|
| Denise Welch | 53 | Actress and TV panellist | 1 | 23 | Winner |
| Frankie Cocozza | 18 | The X Factor 2011 finalist | 1 | 23 | Runner-up |
| Gareth Thomas | 37 | Rugby player | 1 | 23 | 3rd place |
| Michael Madsen | 53 | Actor | 1 | 23 | 4th place |
| Karissa and Kristina Shannon (Note: Karissa and Kristina entered the house together on Day 1 and were treated as a single housemate for the duration of the series.) | 22 | Playboy playmates and glamour models | 1 | 23 | 5th place |
| Romeo | 31 | Rapper | 1 | 21 | Evicted |
| Nicola McLean | 30 | Glamour model and media personality | 1 | 21 | Evicted |
| Natalie Cassidy | 28 | Actress and TV personality | 1 | 16 | Evicted |
| Kirk Norcross | 23 | Reality TV star | 1 | 16 | Evicted |
| Georgia Salpa | 26 | Model | 1 | 14 | Evicted |
| Natasha Giggs | 29 | Affair with Ryan Giggs | 1 | 9 | Evicted |
| Andrew Stone | 39 | Reality TV star | 1 | 7 | Evicted |

=== Andrew Stone ===
Andrew Stone (born 15 December 1972) was the lead singer and songwriter for the group Starman, who is known for appearing on the Sky1 TV series Pineapple Dance Studios. He was nominated for eviction on Day 4 and was first person to be evicted on Day 7. In keeping with the "Fairy Tale" task he left via the Big Brother garden in a horse and carriage.

=== Denise Welch ===
Denise Welch (born 22 May 1958) is an English actress, dancer and television presenter, best known for her appearances on Coronation Street, Waterloo Road and Loose Women. She won the show as the contestant with the highest number of public votes. Denise has now split from her husband Tim Healy and is a regular panelist on Loose Women.

=== Frankie Cocozza ===
Frankie Cocozza (born 17 January 1993) is a former contestant in the eighth series of The X Factor; from which he was disqualified after evidence of cocaine use surfaced. He was runner-up, coming second to celebrity Denise Welch.

=== Gareth Thomas ===
Gareth "Alfie" Thomas (born 25 July 1974), is a Welsh retired professional rugby union and rugby league player, and in December 2009, he became the first openly gay rugby player in Britain. He is the ambassador for the 2013 Rugby League World Cup. He finished the series in 3rd Place, being the third housemate eliminated in the final.

=== Georgia Salpa ===
Georgia Salpa (born 14 May 1985, Athens, Greece) is a Greek-Irish model known for appearances on Irish television in The Podge and Rodge Show, Republic of Telly, Celebrity Salon and Catwalk to Kilimanjaro. She was nominated for eviction on Day 4. She survived the vote, was not eligible to be nominated during the next round, when she was the only housemate to nominate. She was nominated on Day 11 and became the third housemate evicted on Day 14.

=== Karissa and Kristina Shannon ===
Karissa and Kristina Shannon (born 2 October 1989) are American glamour models, Playboy Playmates and twin sisters. They first appeared in the Playboy Mansion in 2008 before leaving in 2010. They finished the series in 5th Place, becoming the first housemates eliminated in the final.

=== Kirk Norcross ===
Kirk Norcross (born 21 April 1988) is a British television personality and a club promoter for Sugar Hut, a nightclub in Brentwood, Essex. He became known to the public in 2010 after appearing on The Only Way Is Essex. Norcross was nominated for eviction on Day 14 against all housemates other than Gareth, he was evicted from the house after receiving the fewest votes to save on Day 16.

=== Michael Madsen ===
Michael Madsen (born 25 September 1957- died 3 July 2025) was an American actor, poet, and photographer. He has appeared in more than 150 films, most of them small independent films, though he has starred in central roles in such films as Reservoir Dogs, Die Another Day, Thelma and Louise, Free Willy, Donnie Brasco, and Kill Bill, in addition to a supporting role in Sin City. Madsen is also credited with voice work in several video games, including Grand Theft Auto III, True Crime: Streets of L.A. and DRIV3R. He was nominated for eviction on Day 11. He finished the series in 4th Place, being the second housemate eliminated in final.

=== Natalie Cassidy ===
Natalie Cassidy (born 13 May 1983) is a British actress, most commonly known for appearing in the television soap EastEnders as Sonia Fowler. She has also appeared in the BBC Two sitcom Psychoville and was a contestant on the seventh series of Strictly Come Dancing. Natalie was evicted from the house after Kirk, in a double eviction on Day 16.

=== Natasha Giggs ===
Natasha Giggs (born 11 October 1982) is a former estate agent known for having an extramarital affair with the footballer Ryan Giggs, her brother-in-law; the affair was publicised by the media in 2011. She was nominated for eviction by Georgia on Day 7 and became the second housemate to be evicted from the house on Day 9.

=== Nicola McLean ===
Nicola McLean is an English glamour model and media personality. She finished in sixth place on the eighth series of I'm a Celebrity...Get Me Out of Here!. She was nominated for eviction by Georgia on Day 7 but survived the public vote against Natasha Giggs. McLean was a pick to win the entire series, however she began to have several meltdowns in the house. A famous line from one of her meltdowns was "Shred, Shred, Shred" when she shredded her housemates letters from home. In the final week, Nicola polled the fewest votes of the remaining housemates and was consequently evicted on Day 21, two days before the final. She later returned to compete in Celebrity Big Brother 19 as an "All Star" housemate.

=== Romeo ===
MC Romeo (born 23 October 1980; real name Marvin Dawkins) is an English rapper/MC, who found fame in the UK garage group So Solid Crew. Romeo previously appeared on reality TV in The Games (Channel 4) and Don't Tell the Bride (BBC Three). Romeo made it to the final week, but polled the fewest votes in the six-way vote after Nicola was evicted, and was evicted on Day 21, two days before the final.

== Nominations table ==
| | Day 4 | Day 7 | Day 11 | Day 14 | Day 23 Final | | Nominations received |
|---|---|---|---|---|---|---|---|
| Denise | Georgia, Michael | Not eligible | Michael, Georgia | Michael, Karissa & Kristina | Winner (Day 23) | | 2 |
| Frankie | Andrew, Karissa & Kristina | Not eligible | Georgia, Karissa & Kristina | Karissa & Kristina, Romeo | Runner-up (Day 23) | | 3 |
| Gareth | Georgia, Andrew | Not eligible | Georgia, Karissa & Kristina | Karissa & Kristina, Michael | Third place (Day 23) | | 1 |
| Michael | Andrew, Gareth | Not eligible | Denise, Georgia | Denise, Nicola | Fourth place (Day 23) | | 13 |
| Karissa & Kristina | Nicola, Frankie | Not eligible | Michael, Kirk | Kirk, Natalie | Fifth place (Day 23) | | 13 |
| Romeo | Georgia, Natasha | Not eligible | Georgia, Michael | Frankie, Michael | Evicted (Day 21) | | 1 |
| Nicola | Georgia, Karissa & Kristina | Not eligible | Georgia, Michael | Michael, Karissa & Kristina | Evicted (Day 21) | | 4 |
| Natalie | Georgia, Andrew | Not eligible | Georgia, Michael | Michael, Karissa & Kristina | Evicted (Day 16) | | 1 |
| Kirk | Karissa & Kristina, Andrew | Not eligible | Karissa & Kristina, Georgia | Michael, Karissa & Kristina | Evicted (Day 16) | | 3 |
| Georgia | Nicola, Andrew | Nicola, Natasha | Michael, Kirk | Evicted (Day 14) | | | 13 |
| Natasha | Karissa & Kristina, Andrew | Not eligible | Evicted (Day 9) | | | | 3 |
| Andrew | Natasha, Frankie | Evicted (Day 7) | | | | | 7 |
| Notes | none | 1 | 2 | 3 | 4 | | |
| Against public vote | Andrew, Georgia | Natasha, Nicola | Georgia, Michael | Denise, Frankie, Karissa & Kristina, Kirk, Michael, Natalie, Nicola, Romeo | Denise, Frankie, Gareth, Karissa & Kristina, Michael, Nicola, Romeo | | |
| Evicted | Andrew; Fewest votes to save | Natasha; Fewest votes to save | Georgia; Fewest votes to save | Kirk; Fewest votes (out of 8) to save | Nicola; Fewest votes (out of 7) | Romeo; Fewest votes (out of 6) | |
| Evicted | Andrew; Fewest votes to save | Natasha; Fewest votes to save | Georgia; Fewest votes to save | Kirk; Fewest votes (out of 8) to save | Karissa & Kristina; Fewest votes (out of 5) | Michael; Fewest votes (out of 4) | |
| Evicted | Andrew; Fewest votes to save | Natasha; Fewest votes to save | Georgia; Fewest votes to save | Natalie; Fewest votes (out of 7) to save | Gareth; Fewest votes (out of 3) | Frankie; Fewest votes (out of 2) | |
| Evicted | Andrew; Fewest votes to save | Natasha; Fewest votes to save | Georgia; Fewest votes to save | Natalie; Fewest votes (out of 7) to save | Denise; Most votes to win | | |

Notes

- ^Note 1: As part of an eviction twist, Georgia, the housemate to survive eviction on Day 7 had to nominate two housemates to face eviction on Day 9. She chose Nicola and Natasha.
- ^Note 2: Frankie and Nicola won immunity from the third eviction after winning a task.
- ^Note 3: Immediately following Georgia's eviction, the housemates were forced to nominate in quickfire face-to-face nominations, still giving full and frank reasons as usual. As there was a double eviction, the three or more housemates with the most nominations faced the public vote instead of two. The two housemates with the fewest votes were evicted in a double eviction on Day 16.
- ^Note 4: For the final week the public were voting for who they wanted to win rather than to save. The two housemates with the fewest votes were evicted in a surprise double eviction on Day 21.

== Summary ==
| Day 1 | Entrances | Natalie, Michael, Andrew, Karissa and Kristina, Frankie, Gareth, Nicola, Kirk, Georgia, Natasha, Romeo and Denise entered the house. |
| Day 1 | Tasks | Natalie Cassidy, the first housemate to enter the house, was called to the Diary Room and set a secret task by Big Brother; she had to follow Big Brothers instructions via a hidden earpiece. Each time she completed a mini task she won a fellow housemates suitcase, failure to complete each mini task meant a housemate would lose their suitcase each time. She passed the task, although she did not kiss fellow housemate, Frankie Cocozza, on the lips as instructed to do so. As a result, she had to choose one housemate (except herself and the twins counted as one person) to forfeit their suitcase. She chose Romeo. |
| Day 2 | Tasks | Housemates participated in a Celebrity Circuits challenge; various podiums were placed in the garden stating things that certain housemates have done in their past. Each housemate had to connect themselves to certain podiums to complete the circuit. The housemates successfully passed their task and earned Romeo his suitcase. |
| Day 3 | Tasks | Former Celebrity Big Brother housemate, Jodie Marsh, entered the house to judge a fitness task. Housemates had to take part in tasks such as bodybuilding, bleep tests and climbing a 60-foot (18 m) wire ladder in the garden. |
| Day 4 | Nominations | The housemates nominated for the first time. Andrew and Georgia received the most nominations and faced the public vote. |
| Day 5 | Tasks | Denise and Natalie were sent a secret task to collect various items from their fellow housemates by The Cheeky Cherubs(Jedward); they were asked to collect Michael's hat, half of Karissa's sandwich and a lock of Frankie's hair. They successfully passed their task and were awarded each with their favourite meal in the Diary Room. |
| Day 6 | Tasks | All the housemates were set their first shopping task, each housemate portrayed different fairy tale characters; Andrew was The Beast, Denise was The Three Bears, Frankie, Kirk and Romeo were The Three Little Pigs, Gareth was Prince Charming, Georgia was Rapunzel, Karissa was Goldilocks, Kristina was Belle, Michael was Geppetto, Natalie was Red Riding Hood, Natasha was Pinocchio and Nicola was The Big Bad Wolf. |
| Day 7 | Tasks | All housemates continued their fairy tale themed shopping task. They finished their shopping tasks with only £300 left. |
| Day 7 | Exits | Andrew was evicted from the house, receiving the fewest votes to save. |
| Day 7 | Nominations | Due to Georgia surviving the eviction, she was asked by Big Brother to choose the two housemates who will automatically face the public vote. She chose Nicola and Natasha. |
| Day 8 | Tasks | Karissa and Kristina were sent various secret tasks by The Cheeky Cherubs (Jedward); they were asked to hide and lie about who hid Michael's hat, and they were asked to throw some of Frankie's clothes in the swimming pool. On the following evening, Kirk, Georgia, Frankie, Denise and Natasha played a game of spin the bottle in which whoever the bottle pointed at had to kiss the person that the other end was pointing at. Kirk was hoping that he'd get to kiss Georgia but when Georgia shared many kisses with Frankie instead of him, Kirk became a little bit envious of Frankie despite being his friend. |
| Day 9 | Exits | Natasha was evicted from the house, receiving the fewest votes to save. |
| Day 9 | Tasks | Frankie and Romeo were set a secret task in which Frankie will go on separate dates with Karissa and Kristina whilst Romeo gives him tips on how to charm the girls through an earpiece. At the end of the task, the twins must give Frankie a rating out of 10 for his flirting skills. Despite Romeo trying to give Frankie tips on how to win Karissa over, Frankie deliberately messes up the first date in order to get back at Karissa for throwing his clothes in the pool. But Frankie decides to finally listen to Romeo's advice during his date with Kristina, he gives her various complements. But to both Romeo and Frankie's amazement, it's Kristina who impresses Frankie more than anything such as commenting on the fact that she has forgotten to wear a bra and stretching her breasts out towards him. Karissa rates Frankie 0/10 and Kristina rates him 10/10 much to Frankie's delight. |
| Day 10 | Tasks | Housemates divided themselves into five teams for the "Bed Race" task. Each team consisted of a pair of housemates: Red (Kirk, Michael), Pink (Frankie, Nicola), Blue (Gareth, Natalie), Green (Denise, Romeo), Yellow (Georgia, Karissa and Kristina). Housemates raced through a vat of syrup to find teddy bears hidden in pillows on a giant bed. Each team has four bears to retrieve. The winning team was awarded with immunity from the next public vote and the losing team received punishment. The finishing order for the task was: Pink, Red, Yellow, Blue, Green. The punishment for Denise and Romeo consisted of sleeping in a single bed together with the amplified sound of Michael snoring. |
| Day 10 | Events | Frankie and Nicola were granted immunity from nominations. |
| Day 11 | Nominations | The housemates nominated for the second time. Georgia and Michael received the most nominations and faced the public vote. |
| Day 12 | Tasks | For their second shopping task, Big Brother sent housemates ridiculous and random tasks, each of which they must complete in a minute using items scattered around the Big Brother House (similar to the game show Minute to Win It. Big Brother would instruct housemates regarding each task at random through audio, written, and hidden cues. Televised tasks included (and performed by): Get in the wheelie bin in the Garden (Kirk and Frankie, Michael), Get in the treasure chest in the Living Room (Romeo), Get in the red handcuffs hanging from the mannequin in the Garden with the housemate you'd most like to sleep with (Kirk, Georgia), Get in a bath filled with blue dye for at least 30 seconds (Natalie), Get into tomorrow's newspaper by creating drama (Karissa and Kristina), Get in the fat suit and the Portaloo (Gareth), Get into the giant shoe in the Garden (Denise), Get into the music and dance on the circular stage in the Living Room to "Baby" (Frankie), Get into Michael's bed (all housemates). |
| Day 13 | Tasks | The housemates continued with the second day of the "Minute to Get in It" shopping task. Televised tasks included (and performed by): Get in the candle suit and in the cake in the Garden (Frankie), Get in the dog costume and in the character of a dog (Denise), Get into the boat in the Bathroom area with the housemates you nominated on Sunday (Kirk, Georgia and Karissa and Kristina), Get in the gift-wrapped box to find out how many tasks housemates needed to complete to pass (Gareth). Housemates successfully passed the shopping task and only accrued a total of 5 failures. |
| Day 13 | Events | Big Brother celebrated Frankie's 19th birthday with birthday-themed tasks and a rock star-themed reward party. Due to being very drunk, Denise cavorts topless in the hot tub with Frankie who doesn't appear to have a problem with it. But some of the other housemates are not so enthusiastic about Denise's strange behaviour and a seemingly over-protective Nicola puts a black top on Denise to cover up her breasts then demands her to get out the hot tub and go to bed. The other housemates discuss her disgraceful antics and assume that she has secret soft spot for Frankie as well as being drunk |
| Day 14 | Tasks | In "Playing for a Saying" housemates were divided into three groups: the Red Team (Kirk, Michael, Romeo), the Blue Team (Frankie, Gareth, Georgia, Nicola), and the Actors (Denise, Karissa and Kristina, Natalie). The Actors mimed well known sayings using bizarre props. The teams watching the silent actions via a television had to buzz-in first to provide an answer. The Blue Team won the task with a final score of 7–4. |
| Day 14 | Exits | Georgia was evicted from the house, receiving the fewest votes to save. |
| Day 14 | Nominations | The housemates nominated for the third and final time. Denise, Frankie, Karissa & Kristina, Kirk, Michael, Natalie, Nicola and Romeo received the most nominations and faced the public vote. |
| Day 15 | Tasks | Big Brother divided housemates into two teams. Each team has red button and a shredder, the team that pressed their button first would receive letters from home but as a consequence would shred the other team's letters. If neither team had pressed their button after 15 minutes, all letters would be shredded. The teams were placed in two different rooms and could not communicate with members of the other team. The team consisting of Denise, Frankie, Gareth, and Karissa and Kristina planned to not press their button while the team consisting of Kirk, Michael, Natalie, and Kirk came to the consensus to shred the other team's letters. After one second, Nicola pressed the button shredding the other team's letters. |
| Day 16 | Tasks | Big Brother sent Gareth on a secret mission to use his sporting experience to motivate each housemate one-on-one with a pep talk using as many sporting phrases to ready themselves for the upcoming eviction and inspire them for their remaining time in the Big Brother House. Once Gareth completed talking to all housemates, he had to get all housemates into a huddle and sing Bread of Heaven. Gareth successfully completed the task and as a reward, received his letter from home. |
| Day 16 | Exits | Kirk and Natalie were evicted from the house, respectively, receiving the fewest votes to save. |
| Day 17 | Tasks | Big Brother decided to play an elaborate hoax on three housemates, fooling them into thinking that they were all now superstars in Japan because of the show and that the fictional Japanese show Super Chat wanted to conduct a live interview, to be broadcast in Japan. Big Brother instructed Denise to select the three housemates (Gareth, Karissa and Kristina, and Romeo) who would be the most gullible to believe in their newly found international fame. Denise and the remaining housemates had to convince the selected housemates that the interview was real. The gullible housemates endured strange and unusual tasks such as dancing in a sushi costume, getting sprayed with aerosol string by a ninja, eating an entire bowl fish head ramen, and applying beauty products made from animals and animal excrements. As a reward, housemates received a Japanese and karaoke themed party. |
| Day 18 | Tasks | As part of a spelling bee task, housemates were provided with bee costumes. Frankie was selected as the queen bee and had to correctly spell bee-related words such as "sting," "pansy," and "chrysanthemum". For each word that Frankie spelled incorrectly, housemates would be sent an electrical shock. Depending on the amount of words that Frankie spelled correctly, housemates could win alcohol for the night or a full party. Frankie correctly spelled five words resulting in a reward of alcohol for the entire house. |
| Day 18 | Events | A huge argument erupted in the house after a drunken Denise pulled down Karissa's trousers. During this argument, Karissa and Nicola both stated that they wanted to leave the house, whilst Denise reprimanded Nicola on shredding her letter from home from the task on Day 15. The argument soon spiralled out of control which led to Frankie trying to calm the girls down. He also stood up for Denise and comforted her when she was crying, much to Nicola's annoyance. |
| Day 19 | Tasks | In order to raise the house morale following the argument on Day 18, Big Brother asked Michael to lead the house in a spoken word recital. Housemates were provided with props and instruments for inspiration in writing poetry reflecting on the housemates' experiences in the Big Brother House. |
| Day 20 | Tasks | Housemates were called intro the Diary Room individually for a chance to win a private movie night. Housemates had to retrieve a hidden cinema ticket in a pile of flour while wearing a blindfold and only using their mouth. The housemate with the shortest time would win a movie night for two to share with a housemate of his or her choice. The times for the "Flour Mountain" task were: Denise (68 seconds), Frankie (37 seconds), Michael (20 seconds), Karissa (16 seconds), Kristina (12 seconds), Gareth (4.75 seconds), Nicola (4.5 seconds), Romeo (4 seconds). As a reward, Romeo chose Frankie to watch The Hangover in the Small Task Room. |
| Day 21 | Tasks | Housemates took part in a game titled "Say it or Spray It." Two designated housemates (Nicola, Gareth) had to describe food items traveling on a belt conveyor to the remaining housemates before it reached the end of the belt conveyor. Nicola and Gareth were shown words on a screen commonly associated with each item; they could not specifically use these words in their descriptions. If the remaining housemates could not correctly guess the described item in the allotted time, all guessing housemates would be sprayed with the item. The order of the guessing housemates and their respective items was: Michael (Cappuccino), Romeo (Chocolate), Karissa (Bananas), Frankie (Beer), Kristina (Peas), and Denise (Trout). Michael, Karissa, Kristina, and Denise all answered incorrectly and consequently housemates did not win coffee, bananas, peas, or trout for the final shopping task. |
| Day 21 | Events | Big Brother called Frankie to the Diary Room multiple times, but failed to comply thus breaking house rules. As punishment, Frankie had to do lines. Frankie was instructed to write, "I must come to Diary Room promptly when called by Big Brother" a total of 25 times. After initially refusing to accept the punishment, Big Brother threatened that if Frankie did not comply, all housemates would be punished and after more delays, he eventually followed Big Brother's instructions. |
| Day 21 | Exits | Nicola and Romeo were evicted from the house, respectively, receiving the fewest votes to win, thus far. |
| Day 22 | Events | With no tasks remaining for the series, housemates voted for their favourite celebrity housemates in a variety of categories in the Celebrity Big Brother House Awards. The awards and their recipients were: Best Hair (Frankie), Sexiest Housemate (Romeo), Most Irritating Housemate (Frankie), Best Housemate (Gareth and Natalie). After the awards ceremony, Big Brother treated housemates to an afterparty. |
| Day 23 | Exits | Karissa & Kristina left the house in fifth place, Michael left the house in fourth place, and Gareth left the house in third place. It was then revealed that Denise was the winner, leaving Frankie as the runner-up. |

== Production ==
=== Adverts ===
Adverts for the new series began being shown from 10 December, one featuring Shaun Williamson which began airing on 12 December. An advert aired on 20 December 2011, featuring former celebrity housemates Amy Childs, Jedward and Kerry Katona and presenter Brian Dowling on Channel 5.

=== Sponsor ===
The previous sponsor, Freederm did not return to sponsor the new series. According to their Facebook fanpage, this was because, as a company, they disagreed with actor Michael Madsen's recent direct-to-DVD films and as he was to become a housemate they decided not to renew their contract with Channel 5. Therefore, this series was sponsored by Sheffield-based ISP Plusnet.

=== Live streaming ===
Due to a large outcry from fans in the 2011 series for there being no live streaming, this series introduced a new show named Big Brother: Live from the House, which was scheduled to air after every eviction for one hour on Channel 5's sister channel 5*. On Day 15, Big Brother: Live from the House won 5* its highest ever rating since its launch in 2006, with 994,000 viewers tuning in to watch the live streaming. This has called for Channel 5 to re-introduce the 24-hour live feed.

=== House ===
Channel 5 released images of the updated house two days prior to the launch on 3 January 2012. The physical layout of the house remains mostly unchanged from the previous series, however the house theme was changed to an Alpine chalet, with much wood, fur and leather furnishings. The sauna was removed and a hot tub was installed to replace it. Unlike previous versions of Celebrity Big Brother aired in the winter, the pool still remained in the garden.

=== The Diary Room ===
An image of the diary chair was released on 4 January 2012 on the official Facebook page. The chair is made from wood with leather cushioning, and contributes to the Alpine chalet theme for the house.

== Ratings ==
Official ratings are taken from BARB. +1 ratings are also taken from the Broadcast Audience Research Board.

| | Official viewers (millions) | | | |
| | Week 1 | | Week 2 | Week 3 |
|---|---|---|---|---|
| Monday | | 2.47 | 2.16 | 2.99 |
| Tuesday | | 2.6 | 2.67 | 2.82 |
| Wednesday | | 2.29 | 2.44 | 2.26 |
| Wednesday | | 2.29 | 2.44 | 2.23 |
| Thursday | 3.5 | 2.67 | 2.59 | 2.85 |
| Friday | 2.66 | 2.36 | 2.86 | 3.6 |
| Friday | 2.66 | 2.36 | 2.24 | 3.6 |
| Saturday | 2.29 | 1.95 | 1.99 | |
| Sunday | 2.52 | 1.95 | 2.32 | |
| Weekly average | 2.48 | | 2.41 | 2.79 |
| Running average | 2.48 | | 2.45 | 2.53 |
| Series average | 2.53 | | | |
