= Celebrity Big Brother 2012 =

Celebrity Big Brother 2012 may refer to:

- Either one of two editions of Celebrity Big Brother which both occurred in 2012
  - Celebrity Big Brother 9
  - Celebrity Big Brother 10
