= Carly Cole =

British reality television contestant

- Born: Carly Calder Zucker; 11 May 1984 (age 42); Leytonstone, London, England
- Spouse: Joe Cole (2009–present)

Carly Calder Cole (née Zucker; born 11 May 1984) is a British reality television contestant, fitness trainer and model. She is married to former professional footballer Joe Cole.

== Media career ==
As the partner of footballer Joe Cole, Carly Cole became the subject of media attention during the 2006 FIFA World Cup when the manager of the England national football team, Sven-Göran Eriksson, allowed the footballers' wives and girlfriends ("WAGs") to accompany them during the World Cup.

Cole has modelled for fitness and fashion magazines. She was a contestant on the reality TV show I'm a Celebrity... Get Me out of Here! in 2008, and on 28 November, she became the third person voted out of competition. In 2009, she was the face of a Lynx campaign.

== Personal life ==
Cole is of German and English heritage. She grew up in Leytonstone, East London, and attended Wanstead High School. She has always had an interest in sport, having played football at school and worked as a personal trainer. She is also an avid runner and a yoga enthusiast.

Carly married Joe Cole on 20 June 2009 in Chelsea, London, wearing a £10,000 wedding dress by designer Oscar de la Renta. The couple have a daughter born in March 2010 in London and a son born in October 2012. They had a third child in October 2015.

Cole and her husband founded the 11 Foundation, which works with charities on community projects. In 2020, during the COVID-19 pandemic, the organization supported the opening of a garden at the Queen's Medical Centre in Nottingham.
