= Nicola McLean =

British glamour model, television, and media personality

- Born: Nicola Mary McLean; 18 September 1981 (age 45); London, England
- Occupations: Glamour model; television personality; media personality
- Years active: 1996–present
- Television: I'm a Celebrity...Get Me Out of Here! (2008); Celebrity Big Brother (2012, 2017)
- Height: 5 ft 6 in (1.68 m)
- Spouse: Tom Williams (m. 2009)
- Children: 2

Nicola Mary McLean (born 18 September 1981) is an English glamour model, and television and media personality. She was a contestant in I'm a Celebrity...Get Me Out of Here! in 2008, and Celebrity Big Brother in 2012 and again in the show’s 19th series in 2017, which was an All-Star vs. New Star season. McLean returned as an All-Star and left the house on the final night in fifth place, beating her original season's position of seventh place.

== Early life ==
McLean's parents are Scottish: her father is from Keith and her mother is from Port Glasgow. She was born in London and has one sister. Before becoming a model, McLean was an Army cadet.

== Modelling ==
McLean modelled for Page 3 of The Sun between September 1999 and July 2004; and Page 3 of the Daily Star from 2000 until 2006. One of the UK's most successful glamour models, she appeared on Page 3 in The Sun and Daily Star almost every week for around five years - notching up almost 300 appearances in total.

After having breast implant surgery to increase the size of her bust from 32C to 32E in 2004, McLean left The Sun and continued doing Page 3 for Daily Star, until she became pregnant in 2006. In November 2007, she underwent her second breast enlargement, which took her up to a 32G.

In addition to Page 3, McLean also appeared on the covers of lads' mags including Zoo, Nuts, Front, loaded and Ice.

== Television ==
During her time as a glamour model, McLean often featured on tabloid showbiz gossip pages and latterly as a guest on television shows including The Weakest Link (Page 3 special), Richard & Judy, The Big Breakfast, Test The Nation (WAGs Special) and The Sexiest Girls In Britain.

McLean retired from modelling in 2006 after giving birth. She decided to return to modelling, TV work and acting in early 2008, after being asked to feature as a main subject in the Channel Five TV documentary Help! I've Got a High Maintenance Wife. Since then, she starred in the TV show WAGS' World… With Nicola McLean on Wedding TV and Channel Five's Generation Sex. She returned to glamour modelling assignments in February 2008 with the Daily Star, and she has also appeared on more lads' mags covers. McLean was a contestant in the November 2008 edition of ITV reality TV show I'm A Celebrity, Get Me Out Of Here!. She clashed with fellow camp mate David Van Day during the series. On Day 18 McLean become the seventh celebrity to be eliminated and finished in sixth place.

On 22 November 2008, McLean was chosen by lingerie brand Ultimo to model.

On 5 January 2012, McLean became a housemate on Channel 5's Celebrity Big Brother. She clashed with cast member Denise Welch in a now-infamous row dubbed Pantsgate by the press and viewers and controversially shredded her fellow housemates' letters from home in order to gain her own, shouting "Shred Shred Shred!" as she did so. She was nominated on Day 7 of the series, but survived this eviction on Day 9. She was nominated again on Day 14, but survived this eviction on Day 16. McLean was the sixth housemate to be evicted, on Day 21 of the series, finishing in seventh place overall.

After her popular and controversial stint in Celebrity Big Brother, McLean become a regular fixture on the side show Big Brother's Bit on the Side and in the episode aired on 18 September 2015, had a significant row with reality television star Farrah Abraham.

McLean entered the Celebrity Big Brother house for the second time in January 2017 as an All Star housemate. She was nominated for eviction on Day 20 of the series, but survived this eviction on Day 22. On Day 25, she was nominated for eviction but survived this eviction once again on Day 27. On Day 29, after surviving the final public vote of the series, McLean become one of the show's finalists. During the final on Day 32, McLean finished in fifth place. She returned for Big Brother 18 as a special guest during a shopping task, along with fellow ex-celebrity housemates Marnie Simpson and Gemma Collins. The trio stayed for three days before departing during a live show, during which Nicola gave immunity to Raph Korine. McLean stayed in the Big Brother house for a total of 56 days, one of the longest tenures of any celebrity in the show's history.

Since 2018 she has been a regular panelist on Jeremy Vine on Channel 5.

== Charity work ==
McLean is a supporter of People for the Ethical Treatment of Animals. In May 2009, she was spotted at a protest in London holding a sign that read "Unhappy Birthday Selfridges! Drop Cruel Foie Gras".

== Personal life ==
McLean married footballer Tom Williams on 13 June 2009. The couple have two sons, Rocky and Striker Williams.
