= Louie Spence's Showbusiness =

- Presented by: Louie Spence
- Starring: Andrew Stone; Tricia Walsh-Smith; Mark Battershall; Laura Pye/ Bari Bacco (Manager/ Creator Dreamboys)
- Narrated by: Michael Buerk
- Country of origin: United Kingdom
- Original language: English
- No. of series: 1
- No. of episodes: 10

Production
- Production locations: Pineapple Dance Studios and other locations
- Running time: 60 minutes (inc. commercials)

Original release
- Network: Sky1
- Release: 5 January – 9 March 2011

Related
- Pineapple Dance Studios

Louie Spence's Showbusiness is a docusoap follow-up series to the hit show Pineapple Dance Studios. After initially indicating that a second series of Pineapple Dance Studios would be produced, Sky1 reverted this decision due to failing to come to terms with studio owner Debbie Moore. Louie Spence's Showbusiness had the same format as its predecessor Pineapple Dance Studios and continued, among other things, to follow Pineapple Studios and its characters such as Louie Spence, Andrew Stone and Tricia Walsh-Smith, although Walsh-Smith did not return until episode eight, despite being featured in the opening titles. The show ended after one series.
