= Georgia Salpa =

Greek-Irish glamour model (born 1985)

Georgia Salpa Penna
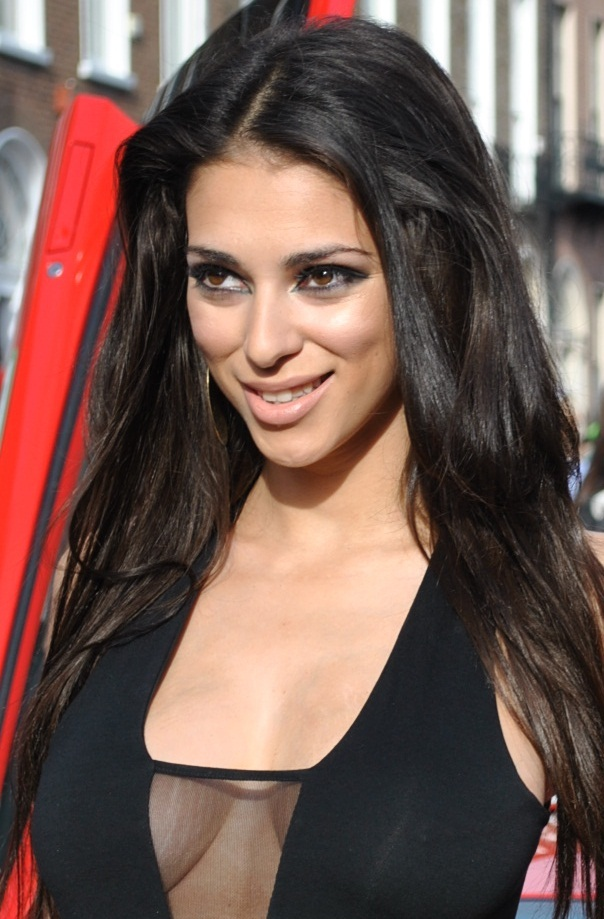
- Salpa in 2010
- Born: 14 May 1985 (age 40); Athens, Greece
- Occupation: Model
- Known for: Celebrity Big Brother (2012)
- Height: 1.73 m (5 ft 8 in)
- Spouse: Joe Penna (m. 2015)
- Children: 3

Georgia Salpa Penna (Greek: Γεωργία Σάλπα; born 14 May 1985) is a Greek-Irish glamour model.

== Personal life ==
Georgia Salpa was born in Athens to an Irish mother and Greek father. When Salpa was five years old, her family moved to Dublin, where she was raised in the suburb of Killiney. In March 2014, Salpa became engaged to millionaire British hedge-fund manager Joe Penna, and was married in Portofino, Italy, in May 2015. They have three children.

== Career ==
Salpa began modelling before leaving secondary school, and has undertaken modelling assignments for various publications. She has made TV appearances on such programmes as The Podge and Rodge Show, Republic of Telly (as herself), Celebrity Salon, and Catwalk to Kilimanjaro. In August 2009, after posing in a bikini for a controversial photoshoot for Food & Wine magazine, the magazine apologised after complaints on Liveline.

Salpa later moved to Great Britain, and participated in the 2012 season of Celebrity Big Brother where she was the third housemate evicted. Also in 2012, Salpa was listed 5th in FHM's "100 sexiest women" poll, and increasingly featured in the magazine including on covers of the French, Czech and Indonesian editions, and as "cover girl" for FHM's 2013 "100 sexiest women" publication.

== See also ==
- List of Celebrity Big Brother housemates
