= Louie Spence =

British dancer and television personality

- Born: 6 April 1969 (age 57); Enfield, London, England
- Education: Italia Conti Performing Arts School
- Occupations: Dancer; choreographer; television presenter
- Years active: 1985–present
- Employer: Pineapple Dance Studios
- Website: louiespence.com

Louie Spence (born 6 April 1969) is an English dancer, choreographer and television presenter, best known for the TV show Pineapple Dance Studios. He was a professional dancer in his youth, performing in West End musicals including Miss Saigon, Cats, and Closer to Heaven. Pineapple Dance Studios was sold around the world and has aired on the US network Ovation since 28 September 2014.

== Early life and education ==
Spence was born in Ponders End, Enfield in the north of Greater London and grew up in Braintree, Essex. He attended Notley High School before moving on to the Italia Conti Academy of Theatre Arts.

== Career ==
=== Dance ===
Spence performed in the West End as part of the award-winning original cast of Miss Saigon. He went on to perform in Cats and Closer to Heaven, and performed with a number of pop acts including the Spice Girls, Take That and Björk.

=== Television ===
From 2004 to 2006, Spence was a judge and mentor on Trouble TV's Bump'n'Grind. Shortly after, Spence became a judge on the television series Cirque de Celebrité on Sky1 from 2006 to 2007 and the American version Celebrity Circus for NBC in 2008. In 2009, Spence was artistic director of the Covent Garden Pineapple Dance Studios when he appeared on a docu-soap Pineapple Dance Studios beginning 14 February 2010 which was a huge hit. However, after initially indicating that a second series would be produced, Sky1 reverted this decision, due to failing to come to terms with studio owner Debbie Moore. Spence was then given his own Sky1 series, Louie Spence's Showbusiness in 2011; however, with the loss of the brand name, the show failed to take off and was cancelled after one series.

In 2011, Spence shot his own TV show in New York City for the OWN network owned by Oprah Winfrey. On 3 December 2011, it was announced Spence would become a new judge on the ITV show Dancing on Ice with Robin Cousins, Katarina Witt and Karen Barber.

On 22 August 2013, Spence entered the Celebrity Big Brother house to participate in the twelfth series. On the first day, he was chosen to be a 'Cult celebrity' meaning he had the power to nominate housemates for the first eviction. Throughout his time in the house, Spence survived three evictions, however he was evicted two days before the final.

Beginning on 1 February 2015, Spence took part in the second series of reality programme The Jump and was eliminated on Day 2.

In August 2018, Spence took part in Celebs on the Farm, and was eliminated on day 9.

Spence was named in the line-up of the 2025 series of Celebrity SAS: Who Dares Wins.

== Autobiography ==
On 29 September 2011, Spence released his autobiography, Still Got It, Never Lost It!, which was published by HarperCollins.

== Filmography ==
Television

Year	Title	Role
2004–2006	Bump'n'Grind	Judge
2006–2007	Cirque de Celebrité	Judge
2010	Pineapple Dance Studios	Himself
2011	Louie Spence's Showbusiness	Presenter
2012	Dancing on Ice	Judge
2013	Celebrity Big Brother	Contestant
2015	The Jump	Contestant
2016	Tour de Celeb	Contestant
2018	Celebs on the Farm	Contestant
2024	Celeb Cooking School	Contestant
2025	Celebrity SAS Who Dares Wins	Contestant; Series 7

Guest appearances

- Harry Hill's TV Burp (13 March 2010) – Guest
- Celebrity Juice (18 March 2010, 25 March 2010, 21 April 2011, 19 April 2012) – Panelist
- Friday Night with Jonathan Ross (23 April 2010) – Guest
- Justin Lee Collins Good Times (14 June 2010) – Guest
- Top Gear (27 June 2010) – Guest
- Alan Carr: Chatty Man (4 July 2010) – Guest
- Shooting Stars (17 August 2010) – Guest
- 8 Out of 10 Cats (24 September 2010, 28 October 2011, 22 June 2012, 29 October 2012) – Panelist
- Chris Moyles' Quiz Night (8 November 2010, 26 December 2011) – Panelist
- The Alan Titchmarsh Show (25 November 2010, 15 March 2011, 24 October 2011, 29 February 2012, 4 March 2013) – Guest
- Benidorm (26 December 2010) – Marvin
- Big Fat Quiz of the Year (3 January 2011) – Guest
- That Sunday Night Show (6 February 2011, 30 October 2011) – Panelist
- Let's Dance for Comic Relief (12 March 2011, 10 March 2012) – Panelist and guest
- Loose Women (28 March 2011, 29 September 2011, 16 January 2012, 2 July 2012, 23 October 2012) – Guest
- Would I Lie to You? (23 September 2011) – Panelist
- The Jonathan Ross Show (24 September 2011) – Guest
- Never Mind the Buzzcocks (3 October 2011) – Panelist
- The Sarah Millican Television Programme (5 April 2012) – Guest
- Mad Mad World (11 August 2012) – Panelist
- Celebrity Wedding Planner (20 August 2012)
- Russell Howard's Good News (11 October 2012) – Guest/Cameo
- All Star Family Fortunes (13 January 2013) – Contestant
- Tipping Point: Lucky Stars (14 July 2013) – Contestant
- Backchat (11 December 2013) – Guest
- Britain's Got More Talent – Multiple guest appearances
- Celebrity Come Dine with Me (27 December 2013) – Contestant
- Fake Reaction (9 January 2014) – Panelist
- Draw It! (19–26 May 2014) – Contestant
- A Question of Sport: Super Saturday (21 June 2014) – Guest
- The Chase: Celebrity Special (1 November 2014) – Contestant
- Pointless Celebrities (15 & 29 November 2014) – Contestant
- Through the Keyhole (26 December 2014 & 2015) – Celebrity homeowner/panelist
- The Big Fat Anniversary Quiz (2 January 2015) – Guest
- Mel and Sue (13 February 2015) – Guest
- Safeword (6 August 2015) – Guest
- Celebrity Fifteen to One (28 August 2015) – Contestant
- Who's Doing the Dishes? (10 September 2015) – Celebrity cook
- A Place in the Sun: Winter Sun (16 January 2017)
- The Crystal Maze (23 January 2017) Stand up to Cancer Special – Contestant
- Celebrity Money for Nothing (September 2017) –
- Tenable All Stars Christmas Special (26 December 2019) - Contestant
