= Tricia Walsh-Smith =

English playwright and actress

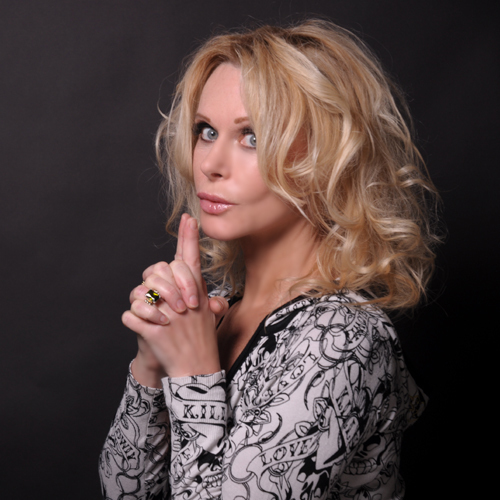
- Born: 24 March 1956 (age 70); Gütersloh, North Rhine-Westphalia, West Germany
- Education: Italia Conti Performing Arts School
- Occupations: Actress, writer, lyricist, singer
- Spouse(s): John Obertelli (m. 1981; div. 1989) Jerrold Arnold (m. 1992–1992) Philip Smith (m. 1999; div. 2008)
- Children: Jamie Obertelli (b. 1982)
- Website: triciawalshsmith.com

Tricia Walsh-Smith (born 24 March 1956) is an English playwright and actress. Her plays include Bonkers, Addictions, The Last Journey and musical Change The Day.

== Early life ==
Born in RAF Gütersloh, Germany, Walsh-Smith was part of a military family which travelled the world until her RAF father's death when she was twelve. She then settled briefly in her mother's hometown of Beverley in the East Riding of Yorkshire, England. Walsh-Smith attended the Italia Conti Academy from the age of fifteen.

== Career ==
Walsh-Smith appeared in over five hundred commercials on British and European television, including as a schoolgirl in the commercial for Hellmann's Mayonnaise. Her television and film roles include the British horror film, Terror (1978), Kenny Everett Video Show, Constant Hot Water, Dick Emery and the children's television drama, Grange Hill.

She has written the play Bonkers which premiered in London in 1987.

In 2007, Walsh-Smith cancelled one production of the play Addictions after learning that Smirnoff Vodka had become a sponsor.https://pagesix.com/2007/01/30/booze-backers-doom-benefit She said: "I was absolutely stunned. I couldn't believe it. The idea of having Smirnoff sponsoring this play, which is about addiction – what were they thinking? ... If we had gone ahead, I would have been looked at as a total hypocrite."

In December 2008, Walsh-Smith released the song "I'm Going Bonkers" on iTunes Its video featured her dancing around London. The video went viral and quickly became YouTube's number one entertainment video.

Walsh-Smith has previewed many of her comedy songs at nightclubs in London and at the O2 Arena and some of the songs were featured in the 12-part television series Pineapple Dance Studios, which aired in 2010 on Sky1 in the UK. In 2011 the series was BAFTA nominated and winner of the Royal Television Society Features and Lifestyle Award. After initially indicating that a second series would be produced, Sky1 reverted this decision due to failing to come to terms with studio owner Debbie Moore.

In 2011, Walsh Smith appeared in Louie Spence's Showbusiness, also on Sky1. For this series, she made two music videos: "Stuff Ding Dong Merrily On High!" for the Christmas Special; and "Should I Go In The Jungle?", which was reportedly a lampooning of the ITV1 series, "I'm a Celebrity...Get Me Out of Here!". Episode Ten featured a workshop of her musical, Change The Day. Pineapple Dance Studios was sold around the world and aired on the US network Ovation in 2014.

Walsh-Smith has appeared as a guest on The Insider (CBS), Good Morning America, (ABC), Inside Edition, (CBS), Geraldo, (Fox), Extra, (NBC), The Jeff Probst Show, (CBS), Sunrise (Channel 7), Access Hollywood, (NBC), Harry Hill's TV Burp, (ITV), The Noughties, (BBC Three), and On the Record with Greta Van Susteren.

== Personal life ==
She met her first husband John Obertelli in 1975 and married him in 1981. They had a son, Jamie. They divorced in 1989. She then had a brief second marriage to American businessman Jerald Arnold. She met her third husband, Philip J. Smith (CEO of The Shubert Organization), at a Park Avenue wedding reception in 1995. The two married in New York City in 1999 and divorced in 2008.

== Internet Pioneer ==
In April 2008, Walsh-Smith made history and attracted international attention for posting a YouTube video of herself discussing her divorce from her husband, CEO and then president of the Shubert Organization, Philip J. Smith. In the video she stated that she was going to be unfairly evicted from her house and called her husband's secretary on speakerphone. Some legal experts consider this the first known case where a spouse has used YouTube in an attempt to gain leverage over the other in a divorce case. Fox News named the initial video one of "The Top 5 Viral Videos of 2008." Walsh Smith's ground breaking divorce video turned her into a historic figure in digital activism. Garnering almost 4 million views, equivalent to billions today, and sparking global feminist conversations. Hailed by New York Magazine as a “standard-bearer for wronged wives,” she has been recognized by MIT’s WGS.111 Gender and Media Studies course (Dr. K.J. Surkan) as an internet pioneer and cyber activist, with her video listed as a required text 2008/contents/readings/index.htm

== Defrauded by Giovanni Di Stefano ==
Four of the fraud counts against bogus lawyer Giovanni Di Stefano related to Walsh-Smith. Di Stefano claimed that he could overturn the Walsh-Smith pre-nuptial agreement, and persuaded Walsh-Smith to invest in News of the World online as Walsh-Smith had been a contributor with a weekly column, "Livin' an' Lovin' with Tricia Walsh-Smith". On 23 March 2012, News International, the paper's former publisher, sued Di Stefano for violating its trademark.

On learning that she had been conned, Walsh-Smith set up a fake TV interview with Di Stefano outside the Royal Courts of Justice, to challenge him on his fraudulent behavior, and uploaded the video on YouTube. The Scottish Sunday Mail ran a piece headlined; "The Devil's Advocate Took me for a Mug." In the article Walsh-Smith said that Di Stefano duped her into handing over more than 100,000 pounds; "He got me to invest in an online version of the News of the World after the paper was shut down. He told me Rupert Murdoch was involved but the cash disappeared." Subsequently, Di Stefano complained to the Press Complaints Commission about the article. The Sunday Mail then agreed to print a statement stating, "Giovanni Di Stefano has denied ripping off Tricia Walsh-Smith."

On 27 March 2013, Di Stefano was found guilty on all four counts relating to Walsh-Smith; nine counts of obtaining a money transfer by deception, eight counts of fraud, three counts of acquiring criminal property, two counts of using a false instrument, one count of attempting to obtain a money transfer by deception, one count of obtaining property by deception and one count of using criminal property. He subsequently pleaded guilty to two additional counts: defrauding a couple out of £160,000, including a woman's life savings of £75,000, and stealing £150,000 from a man who had been in a car accident and lost a limb. He was sentenced to fourteen years in prison.

On 4 April 2014, eight and a half years were added to Di Stefano's fourteen-year sentence, unless he compensated his victims immediately. The judge who jailed him in March 2013 at Southwark Crown Court, Alistair McCreath, told him to "pay back £1.4million forthwith or serve the extra time." He said Di Stefano had no intention of paying and had "stuck up two fingers to the court".
