= Debbie Moore =

English retired model and businesswoman (born 1946)

Debbie Moore OBE
- Born: Dorothy Moore; 31 May 1946 (age 80); Urmston, Lancashire, England
- Occupations: Model; businesswoman
- Years active: 1961–present
- Website: pineapple.uk.com

Debbie Moore OBE (born Dorothy Moore, 31 May 1946) is an English retired model and businesswoman who founded the Pineapple Dance Studios and its associated clothing brand. She was the first woman to float a company on the London Stock Exchange (LSE) and in 1984 was an early winner of the prestigious Veuve Clicquot Business Woman of the Year Award.

== Early life ==
Debbie Moore was born and raised in Urmston, near Manchester, the daughter of Hazel, a clerk, and Ron Moore, a plumber. She has one brother.

Aged 14 she suffered from whooping cough, which kept her out of school for several months, and after her recovery she joined a local commercial college. She returned to commercial college to complete her studies. In the opening line of her book, When a Woman Means Business, she wrote, "I have lost count of the number of times I've been asked how someone like me who left school at fifteen without an O' level to my name, and no business background, could start up and develop a successful business".

== Modelling career ==
At age 15 she won a competition in Honey magazine's search for a model. The competition entry was made on her behalf by her college friends. The first prize was a modelling course at the Sheelah Wilson Model Agency, a cover shoot with Honey, and a visit to the USA which was organised by the magazine. She also did early shoots with British Vogue. The award was presented by Jane Reed of Honey, who later became Managing Editor of Today in the UK.

After the end of her first marriage in 1968, she moved to London to work with agencies Laraine Ashton, and JCJ for TV commercials. Notable campaigns included Revlon, and a billboard in Times Square in New York plus Silvikrin shampoo, Rolo, Timex, and The Guardian. She was a favourite model of the photographer John Swannell, who featured her in a series of images with the American model Lindy Christensen, photographed in 1978.

== Personal life ==
She married the photographer David Grant in March 1966 but they divorced two years later in March 1968. The couple were a fixture on the northern social scene, and they were the focus of a Granada TV documentary, Model Couple, which documented their creative life and included footage of Debbie and David at their respective work.

Moore married accountant Norris Masters (d. 1988) in June 1976, and they had a daughter, Lara, who suffered two spinal haemorrhages during her teenage years, leaving her paralysed. Lara is a champion for disabled rights in the UK and a writer for Marie Claire and Disability now magazine.

== Life after modelling ==
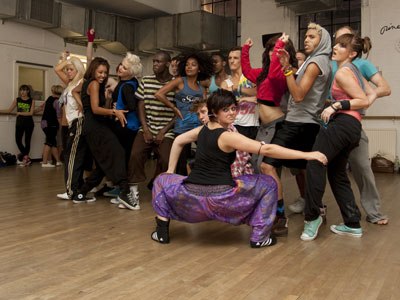
Dance students in class at Pineapple Dance Studios.

Moore started dancing in the Covent Garden Dance Centre in Floral Street on the advice of her doctor after a sudden weight gain later diagnosed due to an under active thyroid complaint. After the sudden closure of the dance centre, she petitioned students and teachers to support her idea of starting another dance centre nearby in an old pineapple warehouse in the then-undeveloped market area of Covent Garden, close to the Royal Opera House. In 1981 she opened a second Pineapple Dance Studio called Pineapple West in Paddington Street, London, near Baker Street.

From the dance studios she developed a line of dance wear using the then non-commercial Lycra fabric. She developed a reputation for colourful designs with a body-conscious aesthetic which was favoured by pop stars and actresses in the 1980s.

With the success of the developing Pineapple brand, she took the company public on the London Stock Exchange on 5 November 1982. She wrote in When a Woman Means Business, "I think it is astounding that I was the first woman to take a company public. The fact that it took until 1982 and that it took an ex-model is bizarre."

Following a rights issue in 1983, when Pineapple shares increased to £3.6m, she opened Pineapple Dance Studios on Broadway in New York and another London studio in South Kensington.

In 1983 she published The Pineapple Dance Book, an insider's guide to the world of fitness and dance including an exercise guide and diet tips. The book features three parts: Inside Pineapple, The Fitness Facts and The Classes. It presents a comprehensive list of exercises for each dance style as well as technical tips and advocate a healthy dance based lifestyle. The following year, she received the Veuve Clicquot Business Woman of the Year Award, along with the Variety Club of Great Britain Woman of the Year Award, presented by the Duke of Edinburgh. Three years later, she opened a Pineapple flagship store in London's King's Road, and opened a total of twelve stores in succeeding years in shopping centres across the UK including Trafford Centre in her native Manchester, Bluewater in Kent, and Churchill Square in Brighton.

In 1988 Pineapple PLC was re-privatised by Debbie Moore in a management buy-out. In 1989 she published When a Woman Means Business, a book offering business and lifestyle advice based on her own experiences and those of other pioneering female entrepreneurs. Ten years later, When A Woman Means Business was reprinted in Chinese as an inspiration to Chinese business women. In the same year, she and Pineapple were nominated for Contemporary Designer of the Year at the British Fashion Awards. In 2000 she signed a licensing deal with the department store Debenhams to sell Pineapple branded products in its stores.

In 2010 Sky One aired the documentary series Pineapple Dance Studios, which was filmed at the studios and followed the lives of staff and students at the London studios of the same name. The documentary featured events celebrating the thirtieth anniversary of Pineapple Dance Studios, as well as personal insights into the life of Debbie Moore.

Moore was appointed Officer of the Order of the British Empire (OBE) in the 2010 New Year Honours for services to business.

In 2011, Moore was awarded an Honorary Master of Arts degree from the University for the Creative Arts.
