= Frankie Cocozza =

British singer

- Born: 17 January 1993 (age 33)
- Origin: Brighton, East Sussex, England
- Genre: Pop
- Occupation: Singer
- Years active: 2011–2014
- Spouse: Bianca Murphy (m. 2018)

Frankie Cocozza (born 17 January 1993) is a British singer from Brighton who was a former contestant on The X Factor (UK).

== Life and career ==
Cocozza auditioned for and appeared on the eighth series of The X Factor in 2011. He was put through to the live shows by Gary Barlow in his Boys category (solo males aged 16–24) alongside Marcus Collins, Craig Colton and James Michael. However, on 8 November 2011, Cocozza left the show after breaking competition rules, admitting his life had "gone out of control" while taking part in the show. He later said he was ejected for boasting to production staff about abusing cocaine. He was replaced by Amelia Lily, who was eliminated in the first live show by her mentor Kelly Rowland.

In January 2012, months after leaving The X Factor, Cocozza became a housemate on the ninth series of Celebrity Big Brother. He finished in second place losing out to actress and television presenter Denise Welch.

On 5 November 2012, Cocozza released his debut EP online, which reached No. 19 on iTunes. "She's Got a Motorcycle" was released as a single, with an accompanying video posted to YouTube. The music video shows Cocozza riding a motorcycle towards a wall of fire. The single reached number 89 in the UK chart.

On 21 April 2013, Cocozza released his second EP to iTunes, titled Embrace which failed to chart Five months later, on 13 September 2013, Cocozza and his band The Telescreen announced through their official PledgeMusic site that they were planning to release a debut studio album set to launch early 2014 if funding succeeded. On 26 February 2014, Cocozza released his band's debut single "Kids" online.

== Personal life ==
Cocozza married Bianca Murphy in 2018. The couple live in Sydney, Australia. They have a son, born in 2019.

== Discography ==
=== Extended plays/EPs ===
Title	Album details
The Motorcycle	Released: 5 November 2012 (iTunes); Formats: Digital download
Embrace	Released: 21 April 2013 (iTunes); Formats: Digital download

=== Singles ===
Year	Title	Peak chart positions		Album
Year	Title	UK	UK Indie Breakers	Album
2012	"She's Got a Motorcycle"	89	17	The Motorcycle
2013	"Catastrophic Casanova"	—	—	The Motorcycle
2013	"Embrace"	—	—	Embrace
