= I'm a Celebrity...Get Me Out of Here! (British TV series) series 8 =

I'm a Celebrity...Get Me Out of Here!
- Series 8
- Presented by: Anthony McPartlin; Declan Donnelly
- No. of days: 21
- No. of castaways: 12
- Winner: Joe Swash
- Runner-up: Martina Navratilova
- Companion show: I'm a Celebrity...Get Me Out of Here! NOW!
- No. of episodes: 20

Release
- Original network: ITV
- Original release: 16 November – 5 December 2008

Series chronology
- ← Previous; Series 7 Next → Series 9

I'm a Celebrity... Get Me Out of Here! returned to ITV1 for an eighth series from 16 November to 5 December 2008. Ant & Dec returned to present the main show on ITV, whilst Matt Willis, Emma Willis and Mark Durden-Smith returned to host spin-off show I'm a Celebrity...Get Me Out of Here! NOW! on ITV2. It was the first series to use a redesigned logo, which imitates the Hollywood Sign. The winner of this series was Joe Swash.

Swash would return to the series fourteen years later to participate in I'm a Celebrity... South Africa alongside other former contestants to try to become the first I'm a Celebrity legend. Swash was the seventh celebrity to be eliminated, finishing ninth overall.

== Contestants ==
The show began with 10 celebrity contestants. On 19 November, they were joined by two new contestants – David Van Day and Timmy Mallett – who were 'kidnapped' on their way into camp, making a total of 12 contestants.

| Celebrity | Known for | Status |
|---|---|---|
| Joe Swash | EastEnders actor | Winner on 5 December 2008 |
| Martina Navratilova | Former tennis player | Runner-up on 5 December 2008 |
| George Takei | Actor | Third place on 5 December 2008 |
| David Van Day | Dollar singer | Eliminated 9th on 4 December 2008 |
| Simon Webbe | Blue singer | Eliminated 8th on 3 December 2008 |
| Nicola McLean | Glamour model | Eliminated 7th on 2 December 2008 |
| Brian Paddick | Former senior police officer & politician | Eliminated 6th on 1 December 2008 |
| Esther Rantzen | Journalist & television presenter | Eliminated 5th on 30 November 2008 |
| Timmy Mallett | Children's television presenter | Eliminated 4th on 29 November 2008 |
| Carly Zucker | Model & personal trainer | Eliminated 3rd on 28 November 2008 |
| Dani Behr | Television presenter, model, & singer | Eliminated 2nd on 27 November 2008 |
| Robert Kilroy-Silk | Former politician & television presenter | Eliminated 1st on 26 November 2008 |

== Results and elimination ==
| Indicates that the celebrity was immune from the public vote |
| Indicates that the celebrity received the most votes |
| Indicates that the celebrity received the fewest votes and was immediately eliminated (no bottom two/three) |
| Indicates that the celebrity was in the bottom two/three in the public vote |

| | Day 12 | Day 13 | Day 14 | Day 15 | Day 16 | Day 17 | Day 18 | Day 19 | Day 20 | Day 21 Final | Number of trials |
|---|---|---|---|---|---|---|---|---|---|---|---|
| Joe | Immune | 1st 27.0% | 2nd 18.6% | 1st 21.0% | 2nd 19.0% | 1st 35.3% | 1st 39.4% | 1st 37.3% | 1st 50.4% | Winner; 68.7% | 7 |
| Martina | 2nd 21.6% | 2nd 14.9% | 1st 21.6% | 4th 16.8% | 3rd 15.3% | 2nd 15.4% | 3rd 13.1% | 2nd 27.5% | 2nd 26.9% | Runner-up; 23.8% | 4 |
| George | 3rd 21.4% | 4th 11.9% | 5th 9.6% | 5th 9.0% | 5th 7.2% | 6th 8.3% | 4th 12.4% | 4th 11.4% | 3rd 13.9% | 3rd 7.5% | 3 |
| David | 1st 26.5% | 3rd 12.5% | 3rd 18.3% | 3rd 19.2% | 1st 35.7% | 4th 12.4% | 2nd 17.0% | 3rd 13.0% | 4th 8.6% | Eliminated (Day 20) | 3 |
| Simon | Immune | 8th 4.0% | 7th 4.2% | Immune | 6th 4.1% | 3rd 13.3% | 5th 10.0% | 5th 10.6% | Eliminated (Day 19) | | 3 |
| Nicola | 4th 16.9% | 5th 8.7% | 4th 12.6% | 2nd 20.1% | 4th 14.3% | 5th 11.8% | 6th 7.8% | Eliminated (Day 18) | | | 3 |
| Brian | 5th 6.9% | 7th 6.8% | 9th 3.6% | 7th 4.4% | Immune | 7th 3.3% | Eliminated (Day 17) | | | | 2 |
| Esther | Immune | 6th 6.9% | 6th 4.9% | 6th 4.8% | 7th 4.0% | Eliminated (Day 16) | | | | | 0 |
| Timmy | Immune | 9th 3.7% | 8th 3.7% | 8th 4.3% | Eliminated (Day 15) | | | | | | 2 |
| Carly | Immune | 10th 2.1% | 10th 2.3% | Eliminated (Day 14) | | | | | | | 1 |
| Dani | Immune | 11th 1.1% | Eliminated (Day 13) | | | | | | | | 1 |
| Robert | 6th 6.4% | Eliminated (Day 12) | | | | | | | | | 3 |
| Bottom two/three | Brian, Robert | Carly, Dani | Brian, Carly | Brian, Timmy | Esther, Simon | Brian, George | George, Nicola, Simon | George, Simon | George, David | None | |
| Eliminated | Robert; 6.4% to save | Dani; 1.1% to save | Carly; 2.3% to save | Timmy; Lost trial | Esther; 4.0% to save | Brian; 3.3% to save | Nicola; 7.8% to save | Simon; 10.6% to save | David; 8.6% to save | George; 7.5% to win | |
| Eliminated | Robert; 6.4% to save | Dani; 1.1% to save | Carly; 2.3% to save | Timmy; Lost trial | Esther; 4.0% to save | Brian; 3.3% to save | Nicola; 7.8% to save | Simon; 10.6% to save | David; 8.6% to save | Martina; 23.8% to win | |
| Eliminated | Robert; 6.4% to save | Dani; 1.1% to save | Carly; 2.3% to save | Timmy; Lost trial | Esther; 4.0% to save | Brian; 3.3% to save | Nicola; 7.8% to save | Simon; 10.6% to save | David; 8.6% to save | Joe; 68.7% to win | |

== The Camps ==
For the first four days of the show, the group of celebrities were split between two camps: "Home", and "Away". The celebrities in each group were:

- Home Camp: Brian, Dani, George, Joe, Martina
- Away Camp: Carly, Esther, Nicola, Robert, Simon

Which group lived in which camp was decided by the first Bushtucker Trial. As Joe won, his group moved in to Home Camp, whilst Simon's group moved into Away Camp. The two camps competed in Bushtucker Trials, with the winning camp receiving better food.

Home was the better of the two camps, featuring a London Bus for the celebrities to sleep in. Contestants in Home camp received British food if they won head-to-head Bushtucker Trials. Meanwhile, the celebrities in Away Camp were forced to sleep on the jungle floor, and received Australian food if they won trials. There was also a jail in away camp for 'naughty' celebs.

On 18 November 2008, the two camps merged. The celebrities in the Away Camp moved into the Home Camp. The merger was due to take place on the morning of 19 November 2008, however it was brought forward after a storm left the Away Camp flooded.

== Bushtucker Trials ==
The contestants take part in daily trials to earn food.

The public voted for who they wanted to face the trial
The contestants decided who did which trial
The trial was compulsory and neither the public or celebrities decided who took part

| Trial number | Air date | Name of trial | Celebrity participation | Public vote | Winner/Number of stars | Notes |
|---|---|---|---|---|---|---|
| 1 | 16 November | Trauma Tank | Joe; Simon | —N/a | Joe | ^{1} |
| 2 | 16 November | Long Drop | Dani; Carly | —N/a | Dani | None |
| 3 | 17 November | I Scream Van | Joe; Nicola | 32.20% 41.79% | Nicola | None |
| 4 | 18 November | Chambers of Horror | Joe; Robert | 28.32% 66.65% | Joe | None |
| 5 | 19 November | John Trevolting | Robert | 48.64% | 10/10 stars | None |
| 6 (Live) | 20 November | Jungle Gym | Robert | 16.53% | 12/12 stars | ^{2} |
| 7 | 22 November | Holey Moley | David | 41.65% | 5/12 stars | ^{3} |
| 8 | 23 November | Critter Chaos | Timmy | 33.26% | 12/12 stars | ^{4} |
| 9 | 24 November | Cavern of Calamity | Nicola | 60.59% | 3/12 stars | None |
| 10 | 25 November | Hell-o-Phone | David | 38.18% | 9/12 stars | None |
| 11 | 27 November | Pluck 'n' Roll | Brian; George | —N/a | 8/11 stars | None |
| 12 | 28 November | Car-nage | Martina | —N/a | 10/10 stars | None |
| 13 | 29 November | Dread Over Heels | Joe; Nicola; Simon | —N/a | 8/9 stars | None |
| 14 | 30 November | Last Chance Saloon | Brian; Timmy | 4.46% 4.30% | Brian | ^{5} |
| 15 | 1 December | Last Gasp | Simon | —N/a | 6/7 stars | None |
| 16 | 2 December | The Tower of Terror | Joe | —N/a | 6/6 stars | None |
| 17 | 3 December | Wash N' Cry | Martina | —N/a | 2/5 stars | None |
| 18 | 4 December | Celebrity Cyclone | David; George; Joe; Martina | —N/a | 4/4 stars | None |
| 19 | 5 December | Danger Down Under | Joe | —N/a | 5/5 stars | None |
| 20 | 5 December | Bushtucker Bonanza | George | —N/a | 4/5 stars | None |
| 21 | 5 December | Fill Your Face | Martina | —N/a | 5/5 stars | None |

=== Notes ===
^1 Owing to Joe's win, his Team went to the best camp (Home Camp) as the prize
^2 It was a live trial for the first time this series. Also for the first time the other celebrities got to watch
^3 Esther was ruled out of this trial for medical reasons
^4 Simon was ruled out due to an injury to his back received in the Bush Battle, Hog Roast
^5 The two bottom place celebrities in the vote-off went head-to-head in the trial. The loser would go home and the winner would return to camp and be immune from the next vote-off

== Star count ==
| Celebrity | Number of Stars Earned | Percentage |
|---|---|---|
| Brian Paddick | 8/11 stars | 73% |
| Carly Zucker | —N/a | —N/a |
| Dani Behr | —N/a | —N/a |
| David Van Day | 18/28 stars | 64% |
| Esther Rantzen | —N/a | —N/a |
| George Takei | 16/20 stars | 80% |
| Joe Swash | 23/24 stars | 96% |
| Martina Navratilova | 21/24 stars | 88% |
| Nicola McLean | 11/21 stars | 52% |
| Robert Kilroy-Silk | 22/22 stars | 100% |
| Simon Webbe | 14/16 stars | 88% |
| Timmy Mallett | 12/12 stars | 100% |

== Bush Battles ==
Just like Series 7, some celebrities will be granted immunity from the first vote-off. The five winners of this prize will be decided by five 'bush battles' (one winner in each.) Each of the 12 celebrities will compete in one of four battles, each containing three campmates. The winners will automatically gain immunity while the second-placed contestants will compete for a final place in the fifth and final bout. In the end, there were six winners due to a problem in the second battle. This feature replaced the 'Celebrity Chests' for five episodes.

| Battle No. | Broadcast Date | Name of Battle | Theme | Celebrities Taking Part | Winner | Runner-up | Notes |
|---|---|---|---|---|---|---|---|
| 1 | 21 November | The Big Drip | Tactics | Martina, Joe & David | Joe | Martina | None |
| 2 | 22 November | Hog Roast | Stamina | Simon, Brian & Carly | Carly & Simon | Brian | See below |
| 3 | 23 November | Down to the Wire | Concentration | Esther, George & Dani | Dani | Esther | None |
| 4 | 24 November | Up To Your Neck in It | Patience | Robert, Nicola & Timmy | Timmy | Nicola | None |
| 5 | 25 November | Night of the Living Bed | Endurance | Nicola, Martina, Brian, Esther | Esther | Brian | None |

- Simon injured himself during the Hog Roast Bush Battle. Because of this, the battle was forced to end early, and both Carly and Simon won immunity.

== Ratings ==
All ratings are taken from the UK Programme Ratings website, BARB.

| Episode | Air date | Official rating (millions) | ITV weekly rank |
|---|---|---|---|
| 1 | 16 November | 9.38 | 11 |
| 2 | 17 November | 8.76 | 11 |
| 3 | 18 November | 8.30 | 17 |
| 4 | 20 November | 8.61 | 14 |
| 5 | 21 November | 8.36 | 15 |
| 6 | 22 November | 9.40 | 8 |
| 7 | 23 November | 8.13 | 18 |
| 8 | 24 November | 9.10 | 13 |
| 9 | 26 November | 9.11 | 12 |
| 10 | 27 November | 7.99 | 19 |
| 11 | 28 November | 8.42 | 17 |
| 12 | 29 November | 10.19 | 4 |
| 13 | 30 November | 8.46 | 16 |
| 14 | 1 December | 8.58 | 12 |
| 15 | 2 December | 7.91 | 17 |
| 16 | 3 December | 9.12 | 11 |
| 17 | 4 December | 8.41 | 14 |
| 18 | 5 December | 9.80 | 5 |
| Series average | 2008 | 8.78 | —N/a |
| Coming Out | 7 December | 6.36 | 17 |
