= Pineapple Dance Studios (TV series) =

Television series

- Title
- Presented by: Louie Spence
- Starring: Andrew Stone; Tricia Walsh-Smith; Debbie Moore; Mark Battershall; Laura Pye
- Narrated by: Michael Buerk
- Country of origin: United Kingdom
- Original language: English
- No. of series: 1
- No. of episodes: 15

Production
- Production locations: Pineapple Dance Studios and other locations
- Running time: 60 minutes (inc. commercials)

Original release
- Network: Sky1
- Release: 14 February – 20 December 2010

Related
- Louie Spence's Showbusiness

Pineapple Dance Studios is a docusoap which aired on Sky1 during 2010. The show gave viewers an insight into the world of Pineapple Dance Studios, a London dance complex, and introduced several employees including Louie Spence and Andrew Stone plus Pineapple Dance Studio regular Tricia Walsh-Smith. The show was first broadcast on 14 February 2010 on Sky1, with narration by ex-BBC newsreader Michael Buerk, it was presented in a documentary style that included impromptu dancing and the promotional tag-line: "Pineapple Dance Studios: bitching is fabulous!". It was sponsored by Just Dance. It was sold around the world and is currently showing on the US network Ovation. The first episode was broadcast on 28 September 2014.

== Name change and ending ==
After initially indicating that a second series would be produced, Sky1 reversed this decision due to failing to come to terms with studio owner Debbie Moore.

Sky Magazine announced in its December 2010 issue that there would be a 2010 Christmas special on 20 December at 9.30pm on Sky1. Andrew Stone would also get his own one-off TV programme called Andrew Stone's Meaning of Christmas on Sky1. It was also announced that Louie Spence would make an "Alternative Queen's speech". Louie dressed in royal robes and spoke on how his year had been while introducing some of the people who had made it special. Tricia Walsh-Smith shot a Christmas music video and there was a final national anthem with some dance included. The second series of Pineapple Dance Studios was renamed Louie Spence's Showbusiness because of Sky's inability to come to an agreement with company CEO Debbie Moore.

== The Pineapple Dance crew ==
The crew includes Louie Spence, Tricia Walsh-Smith, Debbie Moore, choreographer Mark Battershall and dance teacher Andrew Stone.

== Series 1 (2010) ==
- Louie Spence, and Debbie Moore appeared in all episodes.
- Tricia Walsh-Smith missed four episodes (episodes 3, 5, 7 and 8)
- Laura Pye missed six episodes (episodes 2, 4, 6, 7, 10 and 12)
1. Episode 1: Pilot (Aired on 14 February 2010)
2. Episode 2 (Aired on 21 February 2010)
3. Episode 3 (Aired on 28 February 2010)
4. Episode 4: Slayer (Aired on 7 March 2010)
5. Episode 5 (Aired on 14 March 2010)
6. Episode 6 (Aired on 21 March 2010)
7. Episode 7: PDG (Aired on 28 March 2010)
8. Episode 8: Fe-Nix (Aired on 4 April 2010)
9. Episode 9 (Aired on 11 April 2010)
10. Episode 10 (Aired on 18 April 2010)
11. Episode 11: Burlesque (Aired on 25 April 2010)
12. Episode 12: Remember the Days (Aired on 2 May 2010)
13. Episode 13: Finale (Aired on 9 May 2010)
14. Episode 14: Clip Show (Aired on 12 June 2010)
15. Episode 15: Christmas Special (Aired on 20 December 2010)
