= Pineapple Dance Studios =

Dance studio complex in London, England

Coordinates: 51.5133°N 0.1254°W

- Logo of Pineapple Dance Studios
- Trade name: Pineapple
- Founded: London, England, 1979
- Founder: Debbie Moore
- Headquarters: London, England
- Parent: Pineapple Holdings Limited
- Website: pineapple.uk.com

Pineapple Dance Studios is a dance studio complex, performing arts school, and associated dancewear, clothing, and eyewear brand, based in London, England.

== Origin ==
Pineapple Studios was founded by former model Debbie Moore, who had started dance lessons to alleviate weight gain caused by hypothyroidism. Following the closure of her local dance studio in Covent Garden, she failed to find a suitable alternative, so decided to open her own studio in the area. Pineapple Dance Studios opened in 1979, based in a former pineapple warehouse from which the company gets its name. The site continues to house the dance studios, as well as being the headquarters of the Pineapple Performing Arts School and the studios' associated dancewear and clothing brand.

== Pineapple Studios ==
Originally intended as a drop-in dance centre, Pineapple Studios is a complex of 12 dance studios that are used for various purposes. The studios host over 200 scheduled dance classes each week, open to studio members and the public, however the studios have become most notable for their extensive use by the entertainments industry as a venue for rehearsals, castings and recordings. Clients who use the studios include notable dance companies, record labels, television networks, film studios, West End shows, cruise lines, talent, and model agencies. It is also well known as a rehearsal studio used by celebrities, which have included Madonna, Beyoncé, Girls Aloud, and Kylie Minogue. According to BBC London, it is "one of the world's premier dance studios" and Ballet.co.uk called it a "mecca for dancers". Class Teachers are similarly renowned and include international choreographers such as Rose Alice Larkings. The location, in London's West End "Theatre Land" was a key factor of its success. In her book, When a Woman Means Business, Debbie Moore wrote: "In my case, I knew Covent Garden was the right area".

The studios were the setting for the 2010 Sky1 docusoap Pineapple Dance Studios.

=== Clothing brand ===
Having been regularly employed by the clothing and textiles company Courtaulds, Debbie Moore was also experienced in clothing design and manufacture. During the early 1980s, she began developing her own line of dance-wear, including using Lycra, which at that time was not a widely used fabric. She sold her designs through a shop at the dance studios and this ultimately led to the formation of the Pineapple clothing brand. Louie Spence and Debbie Moore launched the Pineapple Eye-wear range of glasses on 4 August 2010 at Pineapple Dance Studios.

== Documentary ==
A docusoap following Pineapple Studios and its employees such as Louie Spence and Andrew Stone were first shown on 14 February 2010 on Sky1. With narration by ex-BBC newsreader Michael Buerk, it was a documentary that included impromptu dancing and the promotional tag-line: "Pineapple Dance Studios: Where careers are made, dreams are broken, bitching is an Olympic sport and everyone is fabulous!".
