= List of The Real Housewives of Cheshire episodes =

The Real Housewives of Cheshire is a British reality television series that premiered on 12 January 2015 on ITVBe. It chronicles the lives of 5 women — Ampika Pickston, Lauren Simon, Rachel Lugo, Sheena Lynch and Paige Chohan — in Cheshire as they socialise, work on their careers and spend time with their families.

Former cast members featured over the previous seasons are: Tanya Bardsley (1-14), Leanne Brown (1-6), Magali Gorré (1-2), Dawn Ward (1-12), Seema Malhotra (3-19) Stacey Forsey (3-7), Missé Beqiri (3-4), Ester Dohnalová (5-12), Nermina Pieters-Mekic (6-7), Hanna Kinsella (8-16), Perla Navia (8-10), Leilani Dowding (10), Nicole Sealey (11-17), Lystra Adams (12-18), Deborah Davies (13-14), Katie Alex (15), Natasha Hamilton (16) and Ellie Egar (17-18).

As of 26 May 2026, 210 episodes of The Real Housewives of Cheshire have aired over 19 series.

== Series overview ==
| Series | Episodes | | Originally released | |
| Series | Episodes | | First released | Last released |
|---|---|---|---|---|
| 1 | 10 | | 12 January 2015 | 16 March 2015 |
| 2 | 10 | | 7 September 2015 | 9 November 2015 |
| 3 | 11 | | 4 April 2016 | 13 June 2016 |
| 4 | 11 | | 5 September 2016 | 8 November 2016 |
| 5 | 11 | | 27 March 2017 | 30 May 2017 |
| 6 | 11 | | 11 September 2017 | 14 November 2017 |
| 7 | 11 | | 26 March 2018 | 29 May 2018 |
| 8 | 11 | | 10 September 2018 | 13 November 2018 |
| 9 | 11 | | 25 March 2019 | 28 May 2019 |
| 10 | 11 | | 9 September 2019 | 12 November 2019 |
| 11 | 8 | | 20 April 2020 | 8 June 2020 |
| 12 | 11 | | 12 October 2020 | 21 December 2020 |
| 13 | 10 | | 10 May 2021 | 12 July 2021 |
| 14 | 14 | 12 | 11 October 2021 | 21 December 2021 |
| 14 | 14 | 2 (Note: Real Housewives and the Menopause) | 8 August 2022 | 9 August 2022 |
| 15 | 14 | 11 | 22 August 2022 | 31 October 2022 |
| 15 | 14 | 3 (Note: The Real Housewives of Cheshire: Christmas Cruising) | 5 December 2022 | 19 December 2022 |
| 16 | 13 | 11 | 20 March 2023 | 29 May 2023 |
| 16 | 13 | 2 (Note: The Real Housewives of Cheshire: Pride) | 8 January 2024 | 9 January 2024 |
| 17 | 13 | | 25 March 2024 | 17 June 2024 |
| 18 | 13 | | 3 March 2025 | 26 May 2025 |
| 19 | 6 | | 21 April 2026 | 26 May 2026 |

== Episodes ==
=== Series 1 (2015) ===
Tanya Bardsley, Leanne Brown, Magali Gorré, Ampika Pickston, Lauren Simon, and Dawn Ward are introduced as housewives.

| No. overall | No. in series | Title | Original release date |
|---|---|---|---|
| 1 | 1 | "Welcome to Cheshire" | 12 January 2015 |
| 2 | 2 | "This is Ladies Night" | 19 January 2015 |
| 3 | 3 | "The Girl Who Got it All" | 26 January 2015 |
| 4 | 4 | "Dressed for Success" | 2 February 2015 |
| 5 | 5 | "Spa-ing Partners" | 9 February 2015 |
| 6 | 6 | "Going Quackers" | 16 February 2015 |
| 7 | 7 | "Big Night Out" | 23 February 2015 |
| 8 | 8 | "Happy Birthday Sweetie" | 2 March 2015 |
| 9 | 9 | "Lady Luck" | 9 March 2015 |
| 10 | 10 | "Who's Coming to Dinner?" | 16 March 2015 |

=== Series 2 (2015) ===
Chantelle Heskey served as a friend of the housewives in select episodes.

| No. overall | No. in series | Title | Original release date |
|---|---|---|---|
| 11 | 1 | "Off the Rails" | 7 September 2015 |
Tanya throws a birthday party, but has Ampika been badmouthing her? Reports of an incident on a train have Dawn and Magali at loggerheads.
| 12 | 2 | "Girls on Film" | 14 September 2015 |
Tanya tries to get to the bottom of recent cheating rumors. There is drama when Lauren hears that Leanne filmed Magali's outburst on the train.
| 13 | 3 | "You'll Never Be Me" | 21 September 2015 |
Magali confronts Leanne about the train video, while Ampika gets an unexpected visitor. There is a showdown at the Cheshire Polo Match when Dawn and Magali confront each other.
| 14 | 4 | "20 Years and Counting" | 28 September 2015 |
Tanya attempts to heal the rift in the group by inviting the girls on a night out. Dawn celebrates her twentieth wedding anniversary.
| 15 | 5 | "Karma Is a B..." | 5 October 2015 |
Leanne and Tanya jet off to Portugal, Magali and Ampika star in a photo shoot, and Dawn and Magali come face-to-face, but will they clear the air?
| 16 | 6 | "Ladies Who Lunch" | 12 October 2015 |
Tanya plans a charity calendar, Dawn hosts a glamorous lunch, Dean has a romantic proposal for Magali and Lauren plays matchmaker for Ampika.
| 17 | 7 | "Calendar Girls" | 19 October 2015 |
Magali seeks out the wedding dress of her dreams, while Ampika clashes with Dawn on the set of Tanya's charity calendar photo shoot.
| 18 | 8 | "Uninvited" | 26 October 2015 |
The Housewives attend Leanne's teen fashion launch. Lauren sets Ampika up on a blind date. Who will be invited to Magali's big day?
| 19 | 9 | "I Do, I Do, I Do" | 2 November 2015 |
The big day arrives as Magali prepares to renew her wedding vows with Dean, but will any of the Housewives turn up to the event?
| 20 | 10 | "The Masks Are Off" | 9 November 2015 |
Ampika hosts a glamorous masquerade ball to celebrate her birthday, but the night does not go according to plan as plenty of drama soon kicks off. The ongoing feud between Magali and Dawn comes to a dramatic conclusion.

=== Series 3 (2016) ===
Magali Gorré departed as a housewife. Seema Malhotra, Stacey Forsey and Missé Beqiri are introduced as housewives.

| No. overall | No. in series | Title | Original release date |
|---|---|---|---|
| 21 | 1 | "All Change in Cheshire" | 4 April 2016 |
Tanya has exciting news to tell the girls, and Leanne and Dawn's friendship feels the strain after too many champagnes - but things soon hot up when three new housewives join the group. New housewife Seema hosts a fashion event and Dawn, after too many drinks, makes a comment about Missé.
| 22 | 2 | "A Currant Affair" | 11 April 2016 |
Missé is shocked to hear the comments Dawn made about her, Lauren opens up to Ampika about her marriage and Stacey hosts a glamorous dinner party for all the housewives, where there is a rift in the group. Tanya and Missé come to blows over Missé's opinions on the ladies' accents, resulting in Tanya storming out.
| 23 | 3 | "Divas Dancing" | 18 April 2016 |
Lauren heads off on holiday without Paul, while Ampika's feelings for her ex grow stronger. Tanya turns to pregnancy yoga as the other girls get their groove on at a diva dance class. A furious Dawn finds out that it was Stacey who told Missé about her drunken comment. Dawn attempts to clear the air with Missé, but later comes to blows with best friend Leanne on a night out with the girls.
| 24 | 4 | "Shaken and Stirred" | 25 April 2016 |
The fallout from Dawn and Leanne's row continues, with Dawn and Tanya questioning Leanne's motives. Missé throws a glamorous cocktail party, where Seema has a surprise for some of the girls but not others. Dawn and Stacey clash when Dawn confronts Stacey over her telling Missé about the comments she made.
| 25 | 5 | "Fabulous at 40" | 2 May 2016 |
Leanne hosts a glamorous Studio 54 birthday party where Ampika's outfit - or lack thereof - turns heads and gets tongues wagging. Later, Leanne confronts Seema about her not being invited to Paris fashion week, leaving Leanne feeling left out. Lauren kick starts her career and newly found independence, but drops a huge bombshell at the end of the night.
| 26 | 6 | "A Cheshire Girl in Paris" | 9 May 2016 |
Seema takes her latest collection to Paris Fashion Week with Tanya, Missé and Stacey, who are surprised when a couple of unexpected guests crash the fashion show. Lauren seeks guidance from her psychic about her marriage and Dawn thinks Ampika is plotting to turn Leanne against her. Later in Paris, Stacey questions Ampika's financial sources, and Ampika and Missé get into an argument when Missé confronts Ampika about her flirtatious behavior with Dawn's husband.
| 27 | 7 | "Going In-Seine" | 16 May 2016 |
The girls take Paris by storm, with Missé and Ampika attempting to move on after their clash at Seema's Paris fashion show. Back in Cheshire, Lauren poses nude for a portrait painting session. Stacey owns up to having a wild past, Missé and Ampika clash once again when Ampika's brashness offends her, and Ampika expresses her true feelings for ex-husband Mark during a very emotional dinner in the Seine.
| 28 | 8 | "Five Month Scan" | 23 May 2016 |
Tanya has a scan to find out the sex of her baby and reveals the news to the women in typical Bardsley style, while Dawn clashes with Leanne for going away without her. Stacey hosts a social fashion event, where Missé gives Ampika a makeover, but later clashes with Stacey and Seema. The tension between Ampika and Dawn reaches boiling point.
| 29 | 9 | "Ready for Battle" | 30 May 2016 |
Ampika drives a wedge between Dawn and Leanne, Stacey is furious with Missé after a makeover disaster and Tanya storms out of a shampoo launch event.
| 30 | 10 | "Point of No Return" | 6 June 2016 |
There is trouble brewing on the eve of Taylor Ward's 18th birthday party and Dawn and Ampika come face to face for a dramatic final showdown.
| 31 | 11 | "The Reunion" | 13 June 2016 |
Brian Dowling brings the women together to look back at all the drama of the third series, hearing their opinions on one another's behavior as they thrash out their differences.

=== Series 4 (2016) ===
| No. overall | No. in series | Title | Original release date |
|---|---|---|---|
| 32 | 1 | "A Fair to Remember" | 5 September 2016 |
As Tanya enters the final stages of her pregnancy, friendships are at breaking point from gossip and postings on social media. Dawn is fuming that Stacey thinks she's manipulative but plays the doting mother-in-law, as Taylor brings her boyfriend Sam home much to Ashley's horror. Seema prepares her Autumn/Winter fashion collection while Missé gets back into modelling as a runway bride.
| 33 | 2 | "Welcome to The Jungle" | 12 September 2016 |
Ampika offers an olive branch to Tanya but will she be forgiven? Stacey hosts a graduation garden party for her daughter, but things take a turn for the worse with a chaotic and disastrous arrival. Leanne throws a jungle-themed baby shower for Tanya - will all put their differences aside for one day or will the arrival of Ampika cause a big rumble in the jungle?
| 34 | 3 | "Whining and Dining" | 19 September 2016 |
The drama continues at Tanya's baby shower, with Missé in tears and Stacey standing up to Dawn. Lauren gives Ampika her own dose of 'bad energy', while Leanne and Dawn give each other the cold-shoulder. Seema organises a glam dinner for the girls. Ampika drops a bombshell causing a drama with Dawn, and Seema puts Ampika and Lauren in their place.
| 35 | 4 | "Bust-ups and Bombshells" | 26 September 2016 |
Tanya prepares for the imminent arrival of Baby Bardsley with a visit from the Baby Whisperer. Lauren is fuming with Seema after their dinner party bust up. Ampika launches her latest business venture, but will all the girls be there to support her? Missé drops a bombshell about her marriage, and the drama comes to a head as Leanne has words with Dawn.
| 36 | 5 | "Ooh Baby Baby" | 3 October 2016 |
Tanya's baby arrival is here and she'll do whatever it takes to get him out. Ampika enjoys a day golfing with Mark, while Dawn and Leanne continue to argue. Dawn plans an overseas trip for Missé's birthday. Seema launches her latest fashion collection.
| 37 | 6 | "Secrets and Lies..?" | 10 October 2016 |
Godmothers-to-be, Dawn and Leanne, visit Tanya and her newborn Ralphi. The ladies head off to Barcelona for Missé's 30th Birthday. In Barcelona, Missé confides in Dawn about her ongoing marriage issues. Ampika struggles with Missé's intentions for inviting her and later opens up to Leanne about troubles in her love life.
| 38 | 7 | "Heartbreak Hotel" | 17 October 2016 |
Tensions and tears arise while the ladies continue their trip in Barcelona. Missé learns of Ampika's doubts on inviting her, leaving Missé hurt. Later, Ampika opens up to Lauren and Leanne about her love life and Missé opens up to everyone about her troubled marriage. After recently having a child, Tanya who is back in Cheshire makes some plans for her placenta.
| 39 | 8 | "The Smell of Success" | 24 October 2016 |
After the news of Missé's separation is announced in the newspapers, Missé is left feeling devastated. After a spiritual day with Leanne and Ampika, Stacey is in awe after learning what Dawn said about her in Barcelona. Missé and Ampika attempt to clear the air and reconcile at Lauren's perfume launch party.
| 40 | 9 | "Plastic Fantastic" | 31 October 2016 |
It's the day of Dawn's grand opening and Ashley jets off to Monaco – will the clinic be ready in time? Taylor reveals her split with Sam Reece to mum Dawn. Lauren hears what Seema and Stacey said about her perfume launch and isn't happy. Ampika signs up to find love with a megabucks dating agency and makes a very special surprise entrance at Dawn's party.
| 41 | 10 | "Bollywood or Bust" | 7 November 2016 |
Bollywood comes to Cheshire as Seema hosts a 45th birthday extravaganza. Post-birth Tanya has an extreme beauty treatment, vaginal tightening. Lauren is fuming that Seema criticized her perfume launch and wants to have it out with her face to face. Tanya gets her sari in a twist over Stacey, resulting in an explosive argument at Seema's party.
| 42 | 11 | "The Reunion" | 8 November 2016 |
Brian Dowling hosts The Real Housewives of Cheshire – The Reunion, as our eight Housewives come face to face to relive some of the best, funniest, awkward and most tense moments of the series, plus say what they really think of each other.

=== Series 5 (2017) ===
Missé Beqiri departed as a housewife, but served as a friend throughout the series. Ester Dohnalová is introduced as a housewife.

| No. overall | No. in series | Title | Original release date |
|---|---|---|---|
| 43 | 1 | "Czech Her Out" | 27 March 2017 |
The new series kicks off with new business ventures, new friendships and a brand new girl in town. How will she cope entering the lion's den? The manicured nails are sharpened and ready as old feuds and bitter rivalries are reignited.
| 44 | 2 | "Social Friends" | 3 April 2017 |
Seema and Stacey invite the women to celebrate their new business, but the night ends in high drama, tears and smashed champagne glasses.
| 45 | 3 | "The Elephant in the Room" | 10 April 2017 |
Dawn is shocked at Leanne's recent outburst. Lauren shoots a glamorous commercial for her perfume and Stacey reveals her latest art exhibit. Meanwhile there's major drama as the Housewives gather for dinner, with tension brewing around the table and insults flying between Missé and Ampika.
| 46 | 4 | "Read All About It" | 17 April 2017 |
The dinner party drama continues. Dawn and Leanne's feud hits the headlines, but who leaked the story to the papers? Tanya is summoned to a meeting with Dawn, and there's a surprise in store for the girls and talk of wedding bells at Warford Hall.
| 47 | 5 | "Every Dog Has Its Day" | 24 April 2017 |
Lauren has some friendly advice for Dawn. Ampika takes Ester for a very awkward spa day. Sam Reece makes a surprise appearance at Seema's work. Leanne hosts a four-legged charity event – but will everyone be welcome?
| 48 | 6 | "Dubai Bound" | 1 May 2017 |
The housewives jet off to Dubai, but will they have a relaxing break away from all the dramas in Cheshire or will there be tears, tantrums and big surprises in the sunshine?
| 49 | 7 | "There's Something About Ester" | 8 May 2017 |
The ladies' glamorous trip to Dubai continues. Stacey celebrates her birthday in style, and tongues start wagging about Ester's strange behaviour.
| 50 | 8 | "Nice Day for a Gay Wedding" | 15 May 2017 |
Nick and Royston prepare for their big day as they renew their vows at Warford Hall, but will everyone attend? Ester comes clean about her secret double life and shares some big revelations with the ladies.
| 51 | 9 | "The Smiling Assassins" | 22 May 2017 |
The women gather for the launch of Leanne's swimwear range, there is fallout from Ester's big revelation and Dawn is on the warpath with Lauren.
| 52 | 10 | "A Midsummer Night's Mare" | 29 May 2017 |
In the series finale, Tanya celebrates the launch of her new boutique, but showdowns and dramas between the ladies ruin the evening.
| 53 | 11 | "At Home with the Real Housewives of Cheshire" | 30 May 2017 |
Brian Dowling goes behind the scenes to meet women in their homes to find out what really goes on behind the closed doors of the reality show.

=== Series 6 (2017) ===
Ampika Pickston departed as a housewife. Rachel Lugo and Nermina Pieters-Mekic are introduced as housewives. Katie Kane served as a friend of the housewives in select episodes.

| No. overall | No. in series | Title | Original release date |
|---|---|---|---|
| 54 | 1 | "All White on the Night" | 11 September 2017 |
Tanya faces a dilemma, Dawn's family have a big decision to make and Ester bounces back with a revelation.
| 55 | 2 | "Into the Deep" | 18 September 2017 |
The ladies make a splash as they attend a pool party in Cheshire. Stacey's confession forces Tanya to face her fears. Ester's loyalties are tested, leaving her to question her friendship with Dawn.
| 56 | 3 | "Pretty in Pink" | 25 September 2017 |
The guest list for Dawn's blessing is confirmed, but who is invited? Ester attempts to heal old wounds. Nermina hosts a party to remember.
| 57 | 4 | "A Blessing in Disguise" | 2 October 2017 |
As Cheshire prepares for Dawn's blessing, Ester starts to feel her fury, while Tanya struggles to make Seema see sense. It is chukkas away as Lauren hosts a fabulous polo event.
| 58 | 5 | "Queen for a Day" | 9 October 2017 |
Ester attempts to reinvent herself as the new Queen of Cheshire. The Wards have some big decisions to make. Seema goes searching for answers. Leanne goes looking for love. Rachel has a surprise for everyone.
| 59 | 6 | "On the Rocks" | 16 October 2017 |
Can a glamorous trip to Gibraltar help the ladies build some bridges or will it all end in tears? Tanya is shocked by an unexpected revelation.
| 60 | 7 | "Best Frenemies Forever" | 23 October 2017 |
The ladies' trip to Gibraltar descends into chaos thanks to some mischievous monkeys. Relationships reach breaking point as insults fly.
| 61 | 8 | "Reach for the Stars" | 30 October 2017 |
In the aftermath of their Gibraltar trip, the women are keeping busy, but can a surprising invitation help mend old friendships?
| 62 | 9 | "Count Your Blessings" | 6 November 2017 |
Tanya finally hosts the big Bardsley Christening, where Ester and Nermina come to blows.
| 63 | 10 | "Czech Mate" | 13 November 2017 |
With the aftermath of the Christening dividing the wives into two separate camps, Seema attempts to bring everyone together for a glamorous fashion show.
| 64 | 11 | "The Reunion" | 14 November 2017 |
After the events of the series, the housewives reunite to air their concerns with each other. Nermina confronts Ester about how she insulted her husband, Stacey confronts Tanya about how she felt she never liked her and Leanne and Dawn almost come to blows over their ongoing dispute off camera.

=== Series 7 (2018) ===
Leanne Brown departed as a housewife. Christine McGuinness served as a friend of the housewives from episode 5.

| No. overall | No. in series | Title | Original release date |
|---|---|---|---|
| 65 | 1 | "Surprise Surprise" | 26 March 2018 |
A surprise birthday party brings all the girls together again. Will Stacey and Tanya resolve their differences elegantly? Have Ester and Nermina truly moved on after their moment of madness? Meanwhile Tanya considers the implications of having another baby whilst Rachel contemplates Cheshire's latest fashion accessory – a mid-life crisis.
| 66 | 2 | "Please Speak Clearly After the Tone" | 2 April 2018 |
An unexpected phone call from Stacey and Seema turns Ester's world upside down. Meanwhile Lauren's facelift breaks the 'no strings attached' rule, Tanya goes to war at an explosive dinner party and Rachel's twin sister Katie arrives with some devastating news.
| 67 | 3 | "Don't Play It Again, Sister" | 9 April 2018 |
After the explosive discovery of Seema and Stacey's voicemail, battle lines are being drawn. Tanya and Ester try to build bridges, whilst Rachel risks blowing them up when she takes Dawn to task. Tanya takes Project Baby Girl to the next level, but can she convince Phil to get on board? And, as the ladies experience hot Latin dancing and gay bars, Stacey and Tanya try to put their disagreements to bed.
| 68 | 4 | "Close Encounters" | 16 April 2018 |
While Dawn calls on Nermina for some catwalk tips, Lauren uses her perfume range to reveal her new face and Rachel has an uncomfortable surprise in store for John. And at a spooky psychic night Ester hears a shocking secret which spells trouble for all the girls.
| 69 | 5 | "Days of Decadence" | 23 April 2018 |
It's time for the Ward girls to strut their stuff at London Fashion Week under the proud eyes of Nermina and Dawn. Rachel holds her twin Katie's hand as she faces her toughest day yet. There's a new face around Cheshire which gets Ester very excited, and Nick and Royston throw one of the most opulent parties Cheshire has ever seen.
| 70 | 6 | "Cheerio, Cheerio" | 30 April 2018 |
Tanya celebrates a department store launch, while Seema plans a celebration of her own. Rachel tries to heal the group's differences, leading to a confrontation with an emboldened Nermina.
| 71 | 7 | "Seven Brides and a Groom" | 7 May 2018 |
It's a hen party for Seema to remember as she takes the girls to Marrakech. Nermina ruffles feathers at Lauren's birthday party.
| 72 | 8 | "The Bride's Bouquet" | 14 May 2018 |
Seema and Sandeep celebrate 25 years of marriage, but the day doesn't go without a hitch.
| 73 | 9 | "Recipe for Disaster" | 21 May 2018 |
Seema is still reeling from Lauren and Dawn's walk out from her wedding party.
| 74 | 10 | "Bride, Pride, and Prejudice" | 28 May 2018 |
It's all systems GAY for Dawn as she hosts Warford Hall's very own Pride Festival. There are feathers, rainbows and high drama as Stacey and Seema accuse Ester of stirring the social media trolls up. Rachel and Lauren battle confrontations and cake in between bouncy castle rides; and Tanya takes a leaf out of Gwyneth Paltrow's book with a steam clean where the sun doesn't shine.
| 75 | 11 | "The Reunion" | 29 May 2018 |
The Housewives are back for their most explosive Reunion yet. Get ready for fireworks as Brian Dowling bravely gets all the gossip from the glamorous ladies. From wedding tears to memorial giggles and the most awkward voicemail ever caught on camera – how did the Housewives cope?

=== Series 8 (2018) ===
Stacey Forsey and Nermina Pieters-Mekic departed as housewives, but both served as friends in select episodes. Hanna Kinsella and Perla Navia are introduced as housewives. Christine McGuinness served as a friend of the housewives throughout the series.

| No. overall | No. in series | Title | Original release date | UK viewers (millions) (Note: 28 day figures) |
|---|---|---|---|---|
| 76 | 1 | "The Downward Dog" | 10 September 2018 | 0.710 |
The Housewives are back and Cheshire is on fire, literally! Rachel's trust in husband John is dented when she discovers he's been living a secret life. Tanya's on the move after disaster strikes, whilst Dawn struggles with some difficult family news and new housewife Perla finds herself in a sticky situation.
| 77 | 2 | "Forty Five on the Inside" | 17 September 2018 | 0.817 |
It's Dawn's 45th birthday and Cheshire is in full on party mode. Rachel is reeling from the shock of John's secret yoga classes with Perla. Ester finds herself in the firing line for some typically outrageous behavior. After the fire, Tanya moves into a new house, and the fireworks go off in style at Warford Hall.
| 78 | 3 | "Dinner, Dancing...and a disastrous rectum" | 24 September 2018 | 0.821 |
The fallout from Dawn's explosive birthday celebrations causes ruptures in Cheshire. Rachel questions her friendship with Ester. Dawn and Perla face off during a feisty lunchtime encounter. Rachel finally seeks advice about her wonky boobs. And Hanna invites the Housewives out for a spot of getting to know you...but will she regret it?
| 79 | 4 | "Breast of Enemies" | 1 October 2018 | 0.771 |
Whilst Rachel and Perla finally bury the hatchet, Hanna realises that an uneasy truce could be coming to an end. Could there be trouble for dawn and Tanya once more?
| 80 | 5 | "Too Hot to Trot" | 8 October 2018 | 0.702 |
The division between Dawn, Rachel and Tanya grows wider as Hanna's intentions are questioned more and more, while Ester and Zdenka go in search of the perfect face
| 81 | 6 | "Dog Date Afternoon" | 15 October 2018 | 0.852 |
Hanna's well voiced observations have blown the fissures in Cheshire society wide open. Rachel and Dawn's friendship is on the rocks, and the future for Dawn and Tanya looks even more bleak. Meanwhile Seema continues preparations for her dancing competition, Ashley's mum and dad move into Warford Hall, and could romance finally be on the cards for Lauren?
| 82 | 7 | "Any Karma in Palma?" | 22 October 2018 | 0.734 |
Dawn remains unrepentant about her outburst, but the women begin to wonder if her behavior is symptomatic of deeper problems. Ester invites the gang on a city break to Palma.
| 83 | 8 | "Cold Turkey and Chicken Limbo" | 29 October 2018 | 0.670 |
Ester's last attempt to unite the girls in Palma is scuppered by a surprise visit from Christine that threatens to cause even deeper divisions, while Tanya's struggles continue.
| 84 | 9 | "The Best of Intentions" | 5 November 2018 | 0.751 |
Rachel recovers from her operation, Ester's best intentions raise eyebrows, while Seema's revelations spell trouble for Tanya and Perla.
| 85 | 10 | "Frenemies and Foxtrots" | 12 November 2018 | 0.764 |
Seema's charity dance competition gets under way, but tensions between Dawn and Rachel run high once more, while Tanya finds herself torn between Perla and Seema.
| 86 | 11 | "The Reunion" | 13 November 2018 | 0.563 |
Brian Dowling is joined by the show's affluent stars as they dig deep into the highs and lows of the latest dramatic series.

=== Series 9 (2019) ===
Lauren Simon departed as a housewife.

| No. overall | No. in series | Title | Original release date | UK viewers (millions) |
|---|---|---|---|---|
| 87 | 1 | "Here Comes Trouble" | 25 March 2019 | 0.773 |
Dawn throws open the doors to Warford Hall and welcomes a VIP lodger.
| 88 | 2 | "Flirting with Disaster" | 1 April 2019 | 0.786 |
Ester's journey to independence takes another leap forward as she embraces her new career, while Rachel puts her issues at home on the back burner to focus on charity work.
| 89 | 3 | "Grandma's Last Supper" | 8 April 2019 | 0.836 |
After the shock of seeing Hanna and Dawn fall out, Seema is on a mission to bring the women back together - with a dinner party.
| 90 | 4 | "Sex Tips for Housewives" | 15 April 2019 | 0.806 |
As the disastrous dinner party continues, Dawn opens her heart to Tanya, but questions Hanna's behaviour, while Rachel and Ester struggle to move on.
| 91 | 5 | "Leaping Off the Fence" | 22 April 2019 | 0.632 |
Dawn returns to Cheshire with devastating news and also has the stress of a business launch, while Perla has a shocking revelation about Hanna.
| 92 | 6 | "Calling Gloria Seema" | 29 April 2019 | 0.617 |
Ester's newest friend causes a stir at Warford Hall, Dawn releases her inner diva, Perla reveals some unexpected news to Jonny and Tanya questions Seema's intentions.
| 93 | 7 | "Dubai Be Good to Me" | 6 May 2019 | 0.620 |
The women head off on a trip to Dubai, where Rachel's questions about Ester's behavior are finally answered, while Dawn's relationship with Seema is tested.
| 94 | 8 | "Why, Why, Why, Dubai?" | 13 May 2019 | 0.634 |
The trip to Dubai draws to a close. Dawn does not understand Seema's decision to keep Perla's story to herself, and a late-night disagreement gets out of hand.
| 95 | 9 | "P for Positivity" | 20 May 2019 | 0.674 |
Hanna struggles to understand why everyone is questioning her version of events, while Tanya hosts a Positivity Party to try to bring everyone back together.
| 96 | 10 | "Faultless and Fancy Free" | 27 May 2019 | 0.812 |
Seema launches her new collection with a high fashion runaway show, and Hanna turns to Dawn for emotional support after the events of Tanya's party.
| 97 | 11 | "The Reunion" | 28 May 2019 | 0.638 |
As another roller coaster series comes to a close, the Housewives are back to chew the fat and swallow home truths with host Brian Dowling.

=== Series 10 (2019) ===
Leilani Dowding is introduced as a housewife. A 100th episode special was aired between episodes 3 and 4 and featured interview segments from previous housewives Magali Gorré, Lauren Simon, Leanne Brown, Stacey Forsey and Nermina Pieters-Mekic, along with current cast members. The special was narrated by Brian Dowling.

| No. overall | No. in series | Title | Original release date | UK viewers (millions) |
|---|---|---|---|---|
| 98 | 1 | "The Cult of Cheshire" | 9 September 2019 | 0.686 |
As summer breaks over Cheshire, the Housewives attempt to repair the rifts. Tanya harnesses all the positivity she can muster and Hanna counts down the days to her dream wedding.
| 99 | 2 | "Fighting the First Hurdle" | 16 September 2019 | 0.676 |
As Leilani gets to know the inner workings of the Golden Triangle, the ladies react to Ester's big news, and Dawn's world is rocked by an unexpected revelation.
| 100 | 3 | "Diamonds Are for Darby" | 23 September 2019 | 0.629 |
After Seema's tumultuous dinner party, Leilani has a revelation for the girls, Dawn struggles to keep a secret and Rachel faces her fears.
| — | — | "The Real Housewives of Cheshire: 100 Episodes Young" | 23 September 2019 | 0.415 |
The ladies of the glamorous Golden Triangle of Cheshire gather for a very special show celebrating 100 episodes since the series began.
| 101 | 4 | "The Sweet Soul Sisters" | 30 September 2019 | 0.621 |
After battle lines were drawn at the polo, Dawn's furious with Leilani, Ester prepares for her dream photo-shoot and Rachel makes a life changing decision.
| 102 | 5 | "Leather, Feather, Flesh and Whiplash" | 7 October 2019 | 0.692 |
The Housewives are abuzz as they all prepare for the party of the summer, fetish themed event in celebration of Nick's 60th birthday. Not everyone is excited though, as Hanna struggles with the sauciness.
| 103 | 6 | "Playmates of the Month" | 14 October 2019 | 0.669 |
The ladies head to the Czech Republic to celebrate Ester's appearance in Playboy, but will it help or hinder after Leilani's spat with Dawn and Rachel?
| 104 | 7 | "R.S.V.Peed Off" | 21 October 2019 | 0.629 |
As copies of Playboy hit the Czech newsstands, Ester turns her attention to hosting Hanna's Hen do. Tanya is surprised to see a blast from the past.
| 105 | 8 | "Engaged, Enraged and Waiting for an Invite" | 28 October 2019 | 0.724 |
The women react to news of Michael and Darby's engagement, while Rachel and Ester struggle to accept the reasons why they have not been invited to Hanna's wedding.
| 106 | 9 | "Wedding Belles and Bitches" | 4 November 2019 | 0.768 |
Hanna's wedding day arrives and there is excitement for the bride, but the women wonder when their invites will turn up.
| 107 | 10 | "Never, Ever Break Friends" | 11 November 2019 | 0.722 |
Hanna reels when she hears about what happened in Liverpool, while Ester wonders whether she went a step too far. Tanya prepares for the businesswomen of the year awards.
| 108 | 11 | "The Reunion" | 12 November 2019 | 0.598 |
The show's participants join Brian Dowling in a studio setting to debate the highs and the lows of their landmark tenth season.

=== Series 11 (2020) ===
Perla Navia and Leilani Dowding departed as housewives. Lauren Simon rejoined as a housewife. Nicole Sealey was introduced as a housewife. Christine McGuinness served as a friend of the housewives throughout the series.

This series was shortened to eight episodes due to the COVID-19 pandemic.

| No. overall | No. in series | Title | Original release date | UK viewers (millions) |
|---|---|---|---|---|
| 109 | 1 | "Flutter Back Butterfly" | 20 April 2020 | 0.604 |
With Dawn and Hanna's relationship back on collision course and Tanya getting ready to welcome a new addition to the family.
| 110 | 2 | "Excuses, Apologies, Excuses, Apologies" | 27 April 2020 | 0.524 |
As Rachel prepares for her 1970s-themed birthday party, the women begin to question the whereabouts of the cheeky Ester.
| 111 | 3 | "Stilettos on Fire" | 4 May 2020 | 0.618 |
As dog psychics and flirting coaches attempt to solve the women's problems, peace is shattered by a fight between Ester and Dawn.
| 112 | 4 | "Guts for Garters" | 11 May 2020 | 0.574 |
The chaos of Nicole's dinner party continues, leaving old friendships on the brink of implosion. Ester is accused of suggesting Dawn wanted her to have Ashley's baby.
| 113 | 5 | "Whatever Happens In Athens..." | 18 May 2020 | 0.686 |
The women head to Athens for a week, but tension hangs in the air following Nicole's dinner party, while Seema worries about the loyalty of one of her closest friends.
| 114 | 6 | "A Storm in an E-Cup" | 25 May 2020 | 0.509 |
Dawn arrives in Athens, and the housewives brace for trouble as her argument with Tanya resumes. Lauren continues her love-struck pursuit of a Greek Adonis, while Hanna and Nicole discover the joys of motherhood while taking care of some sheep.
| 115 | 7 | "A Greek Tragedy" | 1 June 2020 | 0.608 |
After Tanya's early departure from Athens, a trip to a local vineyard soon lifts everyone's spirits. A huge row between Dawn and Rachel pushes their relationship to breaking point.
| 116 | 8 | "The Reunion" | 8 June 2020 | 0.443 |
Brian Dowling hosts a lock-down reunion as the women look back over the season from the comfort of their own homes.

=== Series 12 (2020) ===
Ester Dohnalová departed as a housewife after episode 2. Lystra Adams was introduced as a housewife from episode 3.

| No. overall | No. in series | Title | Original release date | UK viewers (millions) |
|---|---|---|---|---|
| 117 | 1 | "A Pregnant Applause" | 12 October 2020 | 0.583 |
Everyone celebrating the renewal of Nicole and Joe's wedding vows after the lifting of lock-down.
| 118 | 2 | "Kith & Kinsella" | 19 October 2020 | 0.507 |
Nicole and Ester have some unfinished business to deal with, while Rachel's ready to party, but all the women are rocked by Lauren's devastating news.
| 119 | 3 | "A Diva for Dinner" | 26 October 2020 | 0.561 |
As Ester makes the decision to spend more time in Spain with her partner, the housewives welcome a new face to Cheshire, Lystra. However, a well-meaning dinner party intended to introduce Lystra to all of the ladies ends in disaster with both new and old tensions rising to the surface.
| 120 | 4 | "Anything with a Pulse" | 2 November 2020 | 0.513 |
As Hanna reels from her row with Lystra at Nick and Royston's dinner party, Rachel is particularly annoyed by the way that the couple spoke to her, and as Dawn copes with a frightening diagnosis, Seema and Sandeep pay her a socially distanced visit.
| 121 | 5 | "Naked...With a Horse?" | 9 November 2020 | 0.494 |
Rachel lives her Lady Godiva fantasy when she does a photo shoot naked...with a horse.
| 122 | 6 | "London or Bust" | 16 November 2020 | 0.529 |
The women head to London for a long weekend, but the trip is immediately plunged in to disaster due to the COVID-19 pandemic and some of the group head back home.
| 123 | 7 | "Sliding in DMs" | 23 November 2020 | 0.482 |
A dinner party descends into chaos when Seema, Nicole, Lauren, and Rachel bring up some messages they found that seemingly shows Lystra badmouthing them.
| 124 | 8 | "We Know Who You Are" | 30 November 2020 | N/A |
Hanna hosts a gender reveal party for her baby after attempting to clear the air with Lystra. Rachel is excited when Nick has a question to ask her. The ladies realize that Lystra was telling the truth about the social media account pretending to be her.
| 125 | 9 | "Courting and Cavorting" | 7 December 2020 | 0.598 |
Lauren agrees to see a stylist to shake up her wardrobe, while Rachel plans a surprise for her: a date with a man. Meanwhile, the ladies wonder what's going on with Nicole. Tanya and Lystra are forced to self-isolate while Hanna shoots the commercial for her new product launch.
| 126 | 10 | "The Ice Queen Cometh" | 14 December 2020 | 0.585 |
Hanna launches her new business with a diamond-encrusted celebration, while Lystra returns after isolation, and Dawn prepares for Ashley's birthday bash.
| 127 | 11 | "The Last Supper" | 21 December 2020 | 0.527 |
With a new lock-down imminent, Seema decides to host a dinner party in the hope that any tensions can be resolved so that the women can part ways on better terms. Elsewhere, Dawn puts her family first as they celebrate Ashley's 50th birthday and Tanya makes a surprise appearance - with unexpected results.

=== Series 13 (2021) ===
Dawn Ward departed as a housewife. Deborah Davies was introduced as a housewife. Ester Dohnalová served as a friend from episode 4.

| No. overall | No. in series | Title | Original release date |
|---|---|---|---|
| 128 | 1 | "My Demon Lover" | 10 May 2021 |
The housewives emerge from the lock-down just in time to celebrate the birth of Hanna's new baby boy, while Lauren starts to plan a party of her own. Rachel dives deeper into her new relationship with Nick, any Tanya's quest to be "fit at 40" takes an unexpected turn. Meanwhile Nicole's attempts to explore her psychic ability leads her to a brand new housewife who she predicts will have an impact on everyone's future.
| 129 | 2 | "Still Sorry, Not Sorry" | 17 May 2021 |
Nicole continues to explore her `psychic powers'. Seema's efforts to marry off at least one of her sons results in a surprise for Lystra and Jasmine, while Rachel gets the shock of a lifetime. Meanwhile, the Housewives decide Hannah needs a night off from motherhood, and whisk her away for a cocktail night at Menagerie.
| 130 | 3 | "The Stairway to Cheshire" | 24 May 2021 |
Fallout from Hanna's first night out pushes Tanya, Lystra and Nicole even further apart. Seema and Debbie face their fears, while Hanna makes progress with baby Max. Meanwhile, Rachel's attempts to reunite the group sees them travel to the Lake District for a weekend of birthday celebrations.
| 131 | 4 | "Pray for the Pillow" | 31 May 2021 |
The ladies head to the Lake District to celebrate Lauren, Lystra and Hanna's birthdays. While some disputes are laid to rest, Nicole soon finds herself in hot water for the most unexpected of reasons. Plus, there's surprises galore when the ladies indulge in a night of burlesque fun. Note: Ester Dee makes an appearance in this episode.
| 132 | 5 | "Don't Break the Lakes" | 7 June 2021 |
As the Housewives' trip to the Lake District continues, the birthday celebrations are interrupted by the ongoing fall-out between Debbie and Nicole. Rachel faces her fears as she tackles both bees and ghosts, Ester drops a bombshell and pushes her luck with Lystra whilst Lauren starts to question her friendship with one of the other ladies. Will Hanna's arrival result in high spirits or could their dinner party end in disaster?
| 133 | 6 | "Mourning Has Broken" | 14 June 2021 |
As the Housewives return to Cheshire, there's bad news for the Bardsleys as a death in the family causes heartbreak. It's business as usual with Lystra pulling out all the stops at her latest restaurant whilst Seema looks to the future as she prepares to open a cosmetic clinic. However, Lauren has some home truths to deliver and Hanna starts to question why Nicole keeps finding herself in hot water.
| 134 | 7 | "Posh Paws and Tall Tails" | 21 June 2021 |
Rachel achieves the impossible and brings Tanya and Nicole together in the hope that they'll rediscover their friendship as peace descends across Cheshire. Seema celebrates the opening of her new clinic, a doggy pamper day leaves Lystra and Debbie furious when they hear that they've been implicated in Hanna's conspiracy theory. Plus, the Housewives break out the Lycra to take part in a colour run over a floating assault course
| 135 | 8 | "Miss Chevious and Miss Understood" | 28 June 2021 |
Former Miss Stockport Debbie hopes to reunite the Housewives with a pageant contest, but hula hooping, tap dancing and ventriloquism might not be enough to take the crown. However, as Lauren and Lystra head off to meet their match and Tanya takes care of business, the fall-out over the brainwashing row hangs in the air.
| 136 | 9 | "Bring on the Clowns" | 5 July 2021 |
As Debbie's pageant draws to a close, the curse of the dinner party strikes again, reopening old wounds for all to see. Meanwhile, Lauren and Lystra prepare to meet their match whilst Joe has a big surprise for Nicole, and Rachel and Seema have a close encounter with the spirit world.
| 137 | 10 | "Forty for the First Time" | 12 July 2021 |
As the Housewives come together to celebrate Tanya's 40th birthday, peace finally starts to descend over Cheshire. Lauren decides that it could be time to start acting like an adult whilst Debbie has a close shave with Rachel and a furry friend. Meanwhile, Hanna and Tanya put their recent arguments behind them. And Seema receives devastating news that unexpectedly unites all of the Housewives.

=== Series 14 (2021) ===
Sheena Lynch was introduced as a housewife.

Due to health issues, Tanya Bardsley only appeared in select episodes in the series, but was credited as a main housewife throughout the series. She did not attend the reunion due to this, but a pre-recorded short interview segment was shown instead.

Tanya Bardsley, Hanna Kinsella and Deborah Davies did not appear in the Menopause specials.

| No. overall | No. in series | Title | Original release date |
|---|---|---|---|
| 138 | 1 | "The Girl Who Cried Brains" | 11 October 2021 |
A VIP day out at the Cheshire Horse Trials is on the horizon, while Tanya pleads with her mum Julie and daughter Gabriella not to go under the knife.
| 139 | 2 | "Tell Tales of the Unexpected" | 18 October 2021 |
Sheena feels the strain of trying to keep up with the ladies, and Debbie receives some bittersweet news from her daughter.
| 140 | 3 | "Dazed and Confused" | 25 October 2021 |
It's an emotional day in the Davies household as Debbie's daughter Tiffany flies the nest. The shocking news of Tanya's seizure spreads amongst the Housewives.
| 141 | 4 | "Forever Swimming with Sharks" | 1 November 2021 |
Seema and Nicole decide to face one of their biggest fears, and Tanya continues her recovery after the seizure with mum Julie at her side.
| 142 | 5 | "Episode 5" | 8 November 2021 |
Debbie, Lystra and Lauren tour Edinburgh's historic landmarks on a private open top bus, before the girls indulge in Scottish dancing, bagpipes and haggis at a Scot's Night.
| 143 | 6 | "Laying On The Kilt" | 15 November 2021 |
With two chairs left empty at Seema's dinner party, the question all of the Housewives are left asking is where Hanna and Rachel are in Edinburgh. As the pair come to terms with the shock news of Hanna's pregnancy, they have to decide whether to face their frenemies or take the easy option and avoid them at all costs, but will a no-show just make matters worse for the pair?
| 144 | 7 | "Secret Secrets, Don't Repeat It" | 22 November 2021 |
The Housewives prepare for Hanna's book launch and Rachel's long-awaited boxing match. Lauren raises a glass to Nicole's good health having recovered from Covid, Debbie has some exciting news to celebrate and Sheena unexpectedly gets caught in the crossfire.
| 145 | 8 | "Episode 8" | 29 November 2021 |
Fight night has arrived and after weeks of training, Rachel and Leanne finally go head to head in the `Battle of the Housewives". But as the dust settles, questions continue to be asked about who could have leaked the news of Hanna's pregnancy
| 146 | 9 | "Episode 9" | 6 December 2021 |
Fresh off the launch of her doggy pawfume, Lauren and Gigi are taking the product to the public – and their pooches.It's a family affair as Lystra's business empire looks to expand; Joe pays an emotional tribute to his Dad; Rachel hears some home truths; and Debbie opens up to Hanna and Martin.Meanwhile Sheena and Shane roll the dice on hosting a glitzy casino night. But when conversation turns to the pregnancy leak will Hanna lay her cards on the table.
| 147 | 10 | "The Curious Art of Forgiveness" | 13 December 2021 |
With tensions running high over 'who told who' and 'who text what', can an 'intervention' save Hanna's friendships with Nicole and Seema?Cheshire's most competitive couples take aim at clay pigeon shooting; Debbie receives some shock results at Martin's clinic and can Lystra face her inner demons with the help of a therapist?Meanwhile, Nick and Royston host a clubbing party for all the girls to finally let their hair down. But who will go and who will no-show?
| 148 | 11 | "Hark, The Cheshire Angels Sing" | 20 December 2021 |
A Merry Christmas to one and all! At least that's what The Real Housewives of Cheshire will be hoping gets delivered this festive season.Nicole and Hanna's recent reconciliation was nothing short of a Christmas miracle, but will Hanna and Seema be singing from the same hymn sheet before Santa's sleigh takes flight? Lauren says goodbye to her family home, Debbie reconnects with the group and the gender of Cheshire's newest baby is finally revealed. Meanwhile, Joe and Nicole host Cheshire's most glamorous Christmas party.
| 149 | 12 | "The Reunion" | 21 December 2021 |
The legendary Real Housewives of Cheshire reunion is back... and better than ever! To celebrate this highly-anticipated 150th episode Brian Dowling is on hand to find out whether it's Seasons Greetings...or a case of frost-bitten friendships for our glamorous girls. From boxing to babygate, motherhood to menopause and facelifts to 50ths...nothing is off limits. So, grab yourself a mince pie, pour some eggnog and hold onto your crackers as we unwrap it all.
Specials: Real Housewives and the Menopause
| 150 | 13 | "Episode 1" | 8 August 2022 |
Seema and Nicole are on a mission to get the other Housewives talking all things menopause! But are the other Housewives ready to embark on this journey too?
| 151 | 14 | "Episode 2" | 9 August 2022 |
With plans for Seema's HotMess menopause event underway, the Housewives are feeling inspired to get behind the campaign and spread the message.

=== Series 15 (2022) ===
Tanya Bardsley and Deborah Davies departed as housewives. Katie Alex was introduced as a housewife. Ashley Stobart and Karen Loderick-Peace served as friends of the housewives in select episodes.

Tanya Bardsley and Ester Dohnalová appeared as guests in the Christmas Cruising specials. Katie Alex did not appear in the Christmas Cruising specials.

| No. overall | No. in series | Title | Original release date |
|---|---|---|---|
| 152 | 1 | "Another Year Older, Another Year Wiser?" | 22 August 2022 |
Seema throws Lauren a surprise 50th birthday party bringing the Housewives back together. Meanwhile, Hanna prepares for her second baby with a photoshoot, Nicole dares Lauren to go on a zip wire, and Sheena and Shane celebrate a year of their super car business and invite a new friend along.
| 153 | 2 | "Vagina Monologues" | 29 August 2022 |
Lauren and Rachel treat Hanna to a relaxing spa as she prepares for the birth of her baby, Lystra hosts a glamorous lunch at her country house for Nicole, Sheena, and her new friend Katie, and Nicole organises a couples night.
| 154 | 3 | "The Greater The Obstacle, The Higher The Heels" | 5 September 2022 |
Hanna introduces her beautiful new baby to Rachel, Nicole and Lauren, Seema's back from Dubai and Lystra fills her in on all the gossip at the polo, Katie and Sheena catch up over trapeze yoga, Rachel organises a team-building activity day for all the housewives, and Lauren tells Katie how she really feels.
| 155 | 4 | "Keep Your Friends Close" | 12 September 2022 |
Lauren launches her new dog products and Nicole and Joe help her out, but will sparks fly? Meanwhile, Lystra gives Katie and Sheena a tour of her new restaurant, and Hanna hosts a sip-and-see for her new baby with an unexpected appearance.
| 156 | 5 | "To Move Forward You've Got To Look Back" | 20 September 2022 |
Rachel has some very big news, Katie introduces Hanna to her friend Ashley, Lauren is struggling to adjust to the new dynamics in the group, and Sheena hosts a '70s-themed birthday party.
| 157 | 6 | "Teeing Up A Storm" | 26 September 2022 |
As a game of golf results in high drama between Lystra and Nicole, Rachel takes Nick to his hair transplant and her twin sister gives her some relationship advice. Meanwhile, Katie hosts a drinks night for a select few.
| 158 | 7 | "Mayhem in Malta" | 3 October 2022 |
The Housewives arrive in Valletta for Nicole's glamorous drinks launch - as Rachel lets her hair down and enjoys a break from her responsibilities in Cheshire, Lystra arrives in style by private jet with an old friend.
| 159 | 8 | "High Drama on the High Sea" | 10 October 2022 |
It's sun, sea and stand-offs as the Housewives continue their holiday in Malta - Rachel and Lystra continue to bond, but Karen and Sheena struggle to get along with Lystra caught in the middle. Nicole hires a superyacht for a glamorous photoshoot and drinks reception, but who will rock the boat?
| 160 | 9 | "Back to Reality" | 17 October 2022 |
After an eventful time in Malta, the Housewives arrive back in Cheshire and Katie and Hanna catch up on all the gossip - as Rachel faces up to her responsibilities.
| 161 | 10 | "Fashion Fever" | 24 October 2022 |
The Housewives are reeling after Jasmine's 21st birthday party, Nicole is upset with the way she's been treated, but Seema's fashion showcase brings all the Housewives together.
| 162 | 11 | "The Reunion" | 31 October 2022 |
All the Housewives join Brian Dowling to catch up on the highlights of Series 15.
Specials: Christmas Cruising
| 163 | 1 | "Adios Cheshire, Hola Mexico!" | 5 December 2022 |
The Housewives set sail for the Mexican Riviera to enjoy some last-minute sun, sea and tequila just before Christmas - there's a surprise guest onboard, Rachel has big news to celebrate, and a storm is brewing between Hanna and Seema.
| 164 | 2 | "Trouble at Sea" | 12 December 2022 |
The Housewives arrive at their first stop in Mexico, but they might not still be in the holiday mood after Hanna and Seema's argument. There's also another guest arrival as Tanya Bardsley surprises the girls.
| 165 | 3 | "Tears, Tantrums and Tequila" | 19 December 2022 |
There are tears, tantrums and tequila as the Housewives make their final stops of the cruise in Loretto and Cabo - the girls get fully immersed in Mexican culture, and after it all kicks off at Nicole's wine-tasting evening, Ester hosts a festive dinner party with a difference.

=== Series 16 (2023–2024) ===
Katie Alex departed as a housewife. Natasha Hamilton was introduced as a housewife. Paige Chohan served as a friend of the housewives from episode 2. Tanya Bardsley also served as a friend in select episodes.

Tanya Bardsley, Ampika Pickston and Ester Dohnalová appeared as guests in the Pride specials. Hanna Kinsella and Seema Malhotra did not appear in the Pride specials, it is unknown why they did not appear. Sheena Lynch and Natasha Hamilton only appeared in the Pride specials for one separate scene together and did not partake in the events of the special. This was due to Sheena's religious views and Natasha's recent birth of her daughter.

| No. overall | No. in series | Title | Original release date |
|---|---|---|---|
| 166 | 1 | "Gallivanting at the Gala" | 20 March 2023 |
The Housewives are ready for a glamorous night out at the annual Cheshire Gala, but will a new famous face be the belle of the ball?
| 167 | 2 | "It's Ladies Night and the Feeling's... Frosty!" | 27 March 2023 |
Rachel questions if Hanna interfered in her relationship, whilst Lauren and Nicole continue to drift. Seema organises a night out to bring the girls together, but will a new addition to the group create a stir?
| 168 | 3 | "You've Been Served" | 3 April 2023 |
Natasha reveals some exciting news while Hanna and Rachel deny Seema's frosty accusations... will a dinner party thaw out the problem, or will it blow it up in flames?
| 169 | 4 | "Big V Energy" | 10 April 2023 |
A dramatic dinner party leads to arguments, so Lauren hatches a plan to rekindle frosty friendships. Natasha's secret may be revealed.
| 170 | 5 | "Throwing Down the Gauntlet" | 17 April 2023 |
Lauren sets plans in motion for Lolly's Hollies as Sheena waves the American flag for her big charity event - the Housewives then team up for dodgeball at the fundraiser, but when strong rivalries come head-to-head, could the Housewives' fighting spirit take over more than just the game?
| 171 | 6 | "All Aboard Lolly's Hollies!" | 24 April 2023 |
The ladies land in Lisbon in Portugal with Tanya, but tensions build when one Housewife cancels at the last minute.
| 172 | 7 | "Sun, Sea and Sass" | 1 May 2023 |
The Housewives' holiday in the Lisbon sun continues, but the sunny spell is short-lived when Rachel makes a thunderous exit!
| 173 | 8 | "Wonder Women" | 8 May 2023 |
Rachel is out with the old and Lauren is embracing the new - elsewhere, sparks fly between Nicole and Sheena, Natasha is officially crowned pop royalty, and Seema's charity event brings the house down thanks to a group of strong inspirational women with an important message for us all.
| 174 | 9 | "Jokers, Kings and Warring Queens" | 15 May 2023 |
When Joe reveals a touching surprise, Nicole can't believe her eyes! Lauren introduces the girls to more than just her new homeware line and things go from bad to worse when Sheena and Nicole fail to call a truce at Joe's emotional medieval party.
| 175 | 10 | "Dial Up the Diva" | 22 May 2023 |
Excitement is high as the Housewives finally watch Natasha perform her brand-new music, but building tensions between the group mean that the final number could end with a much bigger bang than expected.
| 176 | 11 | "The Reunion" | 29 May 2023 |
The Housewives join Brian Dowling to discuss the highlights of Series 16.
Specials: Pride
| 177 | 12 | "Full of Pride" | 8 January 2024 |
The Housewives turn up and turn out for Lystra and Ashley's first Pride, Julie has a weekend to remember, and Ampika returns.
| 178 | 13 | "Pride: Strike a Pose" | 9 January 2024 |
The Pride party continues with the Housewives competing in a sporting event with a difference, drama unfolding with Ester and Ampika stuck in the middle, Lauren organising a fabulous closing party and Lystra, Nick and Royston attending a meaningful vigil.

=== Series 17 (2024) ===
Hanna Kinsella and Natasha Hamilton departed as housewives. Paige Chohan was upgraded to a housewife after serving as a friend in series 16. Ellie Egar was introduced as a housewife from episode 2. Tanya Bardsley and Ampika Pickston served as friends from episodes 1 and 3 respectively.

| No. overall | No. in series | Title | Original release date |
|---|---|---|---|
| 179 | 1 | "The Perfect Storm" | 25 March 2024 |
A storm is brewing as the Housewives head to the Lake District - their catch-up reveals that big changes are occurring as Rachel struggles to move forward with her next chapter and Seema drops a surprise that sends shockwaves through the group.
| 180 | 2 | "Under the Influence" | 1 April 2024 |
After an explosive end to the Lakes trip, Rachel and Nicole are left questioning where they stand with Seema while a pregnant Paige happily settles into Cheshire life and welcomes new hot fashionista Ell to the group.
| 181 | 3 | "High Spirits and Low Blows" | 8 April 2024 |
Ampika rejoins the housewives to restore peace and harmony to the group, but Lystra still has a score to settle with Rachel.
| 182 | 4 | "Divide and Conquer" | 15 April 2024 |
After their dramatic showdown at the psychic night, Lystra is left hurting and Rachel is completely confused.
| 183 | 5 | "A Night of Intrigue and... Aubergines?!" | 22 April 2024 |
Lauren and Ell put the ladies through their paces as things get rather colourful thanks to Nick and Royston.
| 184 | 6 | "All Will Be Revealed..." | 29 April 2024 |
Lauren gets some new housemates, Ampika drops a big surprise, and Rachel and Lystra finally meet up and try to make up.
| 185 | 7 | "Good Vibes Only" | 6 May 2024 |
Ampika whisks the Housewives away for a five-star Spanish adventure, but a fractious message sends ripples through the group.
| 186 | 8 | "Sunshine and Shockwaves" | 13 May 2024 |
Nicole has some shocking news, Ampika and Rachel try making amends, and the girls' trip ends with a lavish dinner party.
| 187 | 9 | "The Diva Returns" | 20 May 2024 |
Cheshire sees the return of its favourite redhead as Lauren tries to deal with being a local icon now that she's back in reality again.
| 188 | 10 | "The Final Push" | 27 May 2024 |
Paige finally meets her beautiful baby girl, Lauren continues to cling on to the spotlight, and Joe launches a new cupcake venture.
| 189 | 11 | "The Toys Are Out of the Pram!" | 3 June 2024 |
A frosty feud builds between Lauren and Paige as they work on their issues at a motherhood party to avoid a confrontation.
| 190 | 12 | "Hoedown to Showdown" | 10 June 2024 |
Joe and Seema plan a surprise hoedown for Nicole, but Lauren and Paige's bust-up could make for a wild western evening.
| 191 | 13 | "The Reunion" | 17 June 2024 |
The Housewives join Brian Dowling on the sofa to discuss the highlights of Series 17.

=== Series 18 (2025) ===
Nicole Sealey departed as a housewife but appeared in episodes 1 and 2 (credited as a guest). As this series celebrated the 10th anniversary of the show, several past cast members made guest appearances throughout.

| No. overall | No. in series | Title | Original release date |
|---|---|---|---|
| 192 | 1 | "Healing and Reeling" | 3 March 2025 |
With a divide amongst the Housewives, Seema and Sheena organise a friendship retreat, but with so many bonds broken there's a lot at stake! Can Thailand create peace in paradise?
| 193 | 2 | "No Woman Is An Island" | 10 March 2025 |
The friendship retreat is in full swing with safaris, cooking and island hopping, but things don't stay harmonious for long.
| 194 | 3 | "Till Death Do Us Bark" | 17 March 2025 |
An unexpected face shows up to support a brokenhearted Lystra as she says an emotional goodbye to Louis in the ultimate send-off.
| 195 | 4 | "Never Have I Ever..." | 24 March 2025 |
A rumoured voice note creates an iconic showdown between Paige and Seema as things continue to go from bad to worse.
| 196 | 5 | "Demolition Woman" | 31 March 2025 |
The Housewives are divided over Paige's dramatic exit that left Ell caught in the middle, and Rachel and Seema pay Nermina a visit.
| 197 | 6 | "It's Written in the Stars" | 7 April 2025 |
Lauren, Rachel and Lystra head to Chinatown to celebrate Chinese New Year, while Paige discusses the drama of the previous week as tensions rise with Seema.
| 198 | 7 | "A Night of a Thousand Esters" | 14 April 2025 |
The group hosts Ester's hen weekend with the 'night of a thousand Ester's,' plus the girls discuss Lauren's astrology party and the drama with Paige.
| 199 | 8 | "Cooking Up a Storm" | 21 April 2025 |
The women reflect over bubbles and shopping, plus Lauren opens up about her past trauma and upcoming surgery. Paige is also challenged about her issues with Rachel.
| 200 | 9 | "The Green-Eyed Monster" | 28 April 2025 |
Paige delivers some controversial invitations with a bang, Ell sets the record straight with Rachel, and Ampika surprises Seema.
| 201 | 10 | "Cheshire Queens" | 5 May 2025 |
Miss Cheshire is in full swing with Lauren judging the competition. Plus, Ell's emotional charity auction event with her mum gets under way.
| 202 | 11 | "The Intervention" | 12 May 2025 |
Dawn Ward is back in Cheshire and jumping out of a plane, and Sheena hosts a perfume launch that gets fiery when Lystra confronts Rachel.
| 203 | 12 | "All Bark and Plenty of Bite" | 19 May 2025 |
Ampika hosts a charity event & instructs the ladies to be on their best behaviour - with Lystra still reeling, Rachel exasperated, & Paige keen to get answers, the masks are slipping.
| 204 | 13 | "The Reunion" | 26 May 2025 |
The Housewives join Brian Dowling on the sofa, ready to debate the twists & triumphs of the milestone 10th anniversary series as he asks the tough questions we all want answers to.

=== Series 19 (2026) ===
Following the closure of ITVBe, it was announced that the show would move to ITV2. The broadcast of the series was moved to Tuesdays, a change from Mondays which has been the standard since the start of the show.

Lystra Adams and Ellie Egar departed as housewives. Ampika Pickston rejoined as a housewife. Tanya Bardsley and Nermina Pieters-Mekic served as friends throughout the series.

Rather than broadcasting the 12 episodes in one series, from Series 19, the episodes were split into two batches of 6 episodes, broadcast as two series.

| No. overall | No. in series | Title | Original release date |
|---|---|---|---|
| 205 | 1 | "The 7 Year Itch" | 21 April 2026 |
Ampika is back with all the glitz and glam, including a 7 year vendetta! Paige's life is turned upside down and Seema hides a secret.
| 206 | 2 | "Death by Diva" | 28 April 2026 |
Sheena is reeling after Seema's unexpected speech, Paige's house renovations cause cracks in her marriage, a meteor is heading towards Cheshire while Rachel hosts an 80's Diva Murder Mystery.
| 207 | 3 | "I 'Beg' Your Pardon!?" | 5 May 2026 |
Ampika whisks the Housewives away for a country escape, but a suitcase full of gossip leads to tears, tantrums and tension between one pair.
| 208 | 4 | "Love, Lilos and Lies" | 12 May 2026 |
Paige fights for her marriage, and a rift continues between Sheena and Seema. Lauren brings holiday vibes at her lilo launch, but she unveils more than a new business!
| 209 | 5 | "Diamonds are a Girl's Best Fiend!" | 19 May 2026 |
Paige's cheeky invite to her diamond event sparks upset, Ampika's joke offends Lauren, and Sheena and Seema's showdown hits new heights!
| 210 | 6 | "The Final Farewell" | 26 May 2026 |
The Housewives gather for Seema's final farewell, but it's not just emotional goodbyes. Nermina confronts Paige and Sheena, and Ampika leaves Rachel speechless.
