= The Real Housewives of Cheshire series 1 =

The Real Housewives of Cheshire
- Series 1
- Starring: Tanya Bardsley; Leanne Brown; Magali Gorré; Ampika Pickston; Lauren Simon; Dawn Ward
- No. of episodes: 10

Release
- Original network: ITVBe
- Original release: 12 January – 16 March 2015

Season chronology
- Next → Series 2

The first series of The Real Housewives of Cheshire, a British reality television series, was broadcast on ITVBe. It aired from 12 January 2015 until 16 March 2015, and was primarily filmed in Cheshire and Greater Manchester, England. Its executive producers are Daran Little, Sean Murphy, Sarah Dillistone and David Granger.

The Real Housewives of Cheshire focuses on the lives of Ampika Pickston, Dawn Ward, Lauren Simon, Leanne Brown, Magali Gorré and Tanya Bardsley. It consisted of ten episodes.

== Production and crew ==
The Real Housewives of Cheshire was announced on 22 September 2014. ITV had planned to profile the glamorous denizens of London's Knightsbridge in the series, but ITV bosses said "their homes weren't quite big enough..", and so Cheshire was chosen. The show was announced by ITVBe as Britain's first Real Housewives instalment. "From "The Real Housewives" franchise comes the first British spin-off, featuring wealthy residents of Cheshire, including Dawn Ward, Lauren Simon, Leanne Brown, Magali Gorré, Tanya Bardsley and Ampika Pickston."

The series premiered with "Welcome to Cheshire" on 12 January 2015, while the tenth episode "Who's Coming To Dinner...?" served as the season finale, and was aired on 16 March 2015. Daran Little, Sean Murphy, Sarah Dillistone and David Granger are the series' executive producers; it is produced and distributed by Monkey Kingdom, one of Britain's leading independent production companies.

== Cast and synopsis ==
Six housewives were featured during the first season of The Real Housewives of Cheshire. "The Real Housewives Of Cheshire documents the lives and dramas of a group of strong determined women each cast for their envious lifestyles, loveable families and compelling narratives. The Housewives love extremes, drink free flowing champagne, live in beautiful homes and wear the most fashionable and outrageous outfits, shoes and jewellery. Throughout the series the Housewives are put through a rollercoaster of emotions including love, hurt, hate, betrayal, good and poor fortune but are bound together by a shared humanity and group experiences.

== Taglines ==
- Ampika Pickston: "I'm always gonna get interest of the opposite sex, I'm like a snake and when I'm done with you, I'll discard you."
- Dawn Ward: "I've got a wonderful life, I'm gobby, I'm full on. I'll always say what I think, you're not gonna change a leopard's spots."
- Lauren Simon: "I am a domestic goddess. I don't listen to anything anyone tells me, it's all about me."
- Leanne Brown: "I married a footballer, I live in a fairly big house. I'd say it's worked out well."
- Magali Gorre: "When you cross me, you better don't cross me. Don't mess with Magali."
- Tanya Bardsley: "I have my dream body, dream man, career. I've got it all."

== Episodes ==
No. overall	No. in series	Title	Original release date
1	1	"Welcome to Cheshire"	12 January 2015
As one of the biggest nights in the social calendar approaches, it is a whirlwind of cryotherapy treatments and last-minute dress fittings.
2	2	"This is Ladies Night"	19 January 2015
Following Dawn's epic charity ball, Ampika, Tanya and Leanne pay a visit to the gym for a high energy boxing workout. Ampika hosts a dinner party and drops a bombshell at the end of the night.
3	3	"The Girl Who Got it All"	26 January 2015
Ampika's dinner party revelations are the talk of the town. Dawn has to deal with some real life issues, while Tanya and Leanne enjoy some crystal healing therapy.
4	4	"Dressed for Success"	2 February 2015
Leanne confides in Tanya over Magali's allegations. Will Magali snub Leanne's charity event? Ampika and Lauren visit the local animal sanctuary.
5	5	"Spa-ing Partners"	9 February 2015
Tanya organizes a lunch for Leanne and Magali to clear the air. Lauren's straight talking causes a huge rift between the ladies.
6	6	"Going Quackers"	16 February 2015
Lauren jets off to Arizona with husband Paul and tongues wag in her absence. Trouble brews between close friends during another dramatic dinner.
7	7	"Big Night Out"	23 February 2015
It is the one year anniversary of Ampika's salon opening, but not all the housewives are invited to the celebrations, and some of the girls attend a private art launch and head off for a big night out on the town.
8	8	"Happy Birthday Sweetie"	2 March 2015
Leanne hosts a party for her eldest daughter Halle, while Lauren throws a bash for the newest addition to her family - Sweetie the rabbit.
9	9	"Lady Luck"	9 March 2015
Dawn breaks her news to the rest of the family. On a night out at the casino there are pre-nups, bust-ups and a clash between Ampika and Leanne.
10	10	"Who's Coming to Dinner?"	16 March 2015
Dawn hosts a dinner party at Warford Hall, but as usual not everything goes to plan and by the end of the night not everyone is welcome.
