= National Reality Television Awards =

Annual television awards ceremony

National Reality TV Awards
- Current: 12th National Reality TV Awards
- Awarded for: The best in Reality TV
- Country: United Kingdom
- First award: 2011
- Website: www.nationalrealitytvawards.org

The National Reality TV Awards also known as Reality TV Awards or NRTA is an annual award show produced by the IEG Global and National Media Group . The awards show became the first ever awards ceremony to launch in both the UK and US to celebrate the cast and crew from the reality TV industry.

== History ==
NRTA was founded in 2011 as an annual awards ceremony celebrating the achievements of established cast and crew from the reality television industry . The NRTA was the first of its kind to re-define the categories that make up Reality Television into specific genres. The National Reality TV Awards UK launched at the O2 Arena in London in 2011 whilst the US version of the awards show National Reality TV Awards USA launched in Los Angeles at the Crescent Hotel, Beverley Hills in 2012.

== Annual ceremony ==
The ceremony takes place annually in September. The awards are voted for by television fans nationwide.

=== Sponsorship ===
2016, NBC Universal sponsored the awards

== Winners ==
Best Business Show
Year	Winner	Ref.
2011	The Apprentice	
2012	Dragons' Den	
2013	The Apprentice	
2014	Four Rooms	
2015	Storage Hunters UK	
2017	Salvage Hunters	
2018	Dragons' Den	
2019	The Apprentice	
2021	The Apprentice	
2022	The Apprentice	
2023	The Apprentice	
2024	Dubai Hustle	
2025	The Apprentice	
Best Dating Show
Year	Winner	Ref.
2012	Take Me Out	
2013	Girlfri3nds	
2014	Girlfri3nds	
2015	Married at First Sight	
2017	First Dates	
2018	Love Island	
2019	First Dates	
2021	Love Island	
2022	First Dates	
2023	Love Island	
2024	My Mum, Your Dad	
2025	Married at First Sight	
Best Docu-Series
Year	Winner	Ref.
2011	The People’s Supermarket	
2013	The Big Reunion	
2014	The Big Reunion	
2015	Reggie Yates' Extreme Russia	
2017	Katie Price: My Crazy Life	
2018	The Secret Life of the Zoo	
2019	Dynasties	
2021	Me & My 10 Kids	
2022	Jay Blades Home Fix	
2023	90 Day Fiancé UK	
2024	The Jury: Murder Trial	
2025	Louis Theroux: The Settlers	
Best Entertainment Show
Year	Winner	Ref.
2011	The Only Way Is Essex	
2012	The X Factor	
2013	The Only Way Is Essex	
2014	Gogglebox	
2015	Strictly Come Dancing	
2017	Love Island	
2018	The Big Narstie Show	
2019	Love Island	
2021	The Masked Singer	
2022	Britain’s Got Talent	
2023	Celebrity SAS: Who Dares Wins	
2024	Love Island	
2025	Love Island	
Best Fashion & Make Up Show
Year	Winner	Ref.
2011	Snog Marry Avoid?	
2012	Supersize vs. Superskinny	
2013	Hollywood Me	
2018	The Posh Frock Shop	
2019	Say Yes to the Dress: UK	
2021	10 Years Younger in 10 Days	
2022	Glow Up: Britain's Next Make-Up Star	
2023	Glow Up: Britain's Next Make-Up Star	
2024	Glow Up: Britain's Next Make-Up Star	
2025	Glow Up: Britain's Next Make-Up Star	
Best Food Show
Year	Winner	Ref.
2017	Nadiya's British Food Adventure	
2018	Great British Bake Off	
2019	Great British Menu	
2021	Great British Menu	
2022	Bake Off: The Professionals	
2023	Dinner Date	
2024	MasterChef	
2025	Great British Menu	
Best Game Show
Year	Winner	Ref.
2011	Deal or No Deal	
2013	Deal or No Deal	
2014	Deal or No Deal	
2015	The Chase	
2017	The Chase	
2018	Ninja Warrior UK	
2019	Don’t Hate the Playaz	
2021	Beat the Chasers	
2022	The Chase	
2023	The Chase	
2024	The Chase	
2025	The Chase	
Best Health Service TV Show
Year	Winner	Ref.
2021	Stacey Dooley: On the Psych Ward	
Best International TV Show
Year	Winner	Ref.
2011	Keeping up with the Kardashians	
2012	The X Factor	
2013	The X Factor	
2014	Shark Tank	
2015	Pawn Stars	
2017	Shark Tank	
2018	Catfish: The TV Show	
2019	Shark Tank	
2021	Too Hot to Handle	
2022	Too Hot to Handle	
2023	Love & Hip Hop: South Africa	
2024	Dubai Bling	
2025	Tempting Fortune	

Best New Show
Year	Winner	Ref.
2023	Project Icon	
2024	The Fortune Hotel	
2025	Reel Rivals	
Best Podcast
Year	Winner	Ref.
2024	Brown Girls Do It Too with Poppy and Rubina	
2025	Shxts N Gigs with James Duncan and Fuhad Dawodu	
Best Reality Competition Show
Year	Winner	Ref.
2011	The Apprentice	
2012	Strictly Come Dancing	
2013	The Apprentice	
2014	Britain’s Got Talent	
2015	The Apprentice	
2017	Love Island	
2018	You Vs. Chris & Kem	
2019	Love Island	
2021	Love Island	
2022	Strictly Come Dancing	
2023	Britain’s Got Talent	
2024	The Apprentice	
2025	The Traitors UK	
Best Reality Non-Competition Show
Year	Winner	Ref.
2011	The Only Way is Essex	
2012	Made in Chelsea	
2013	The Call Centre	
2014	Gogglebox	
2015	Killer Magic	
2017	The Only Way is Essex	
2018	Ibiza Weekender	
2019	Ibiza Weekender	
2021	Made in Chelsea	
2022	Made in Chelsea	
2023	The Only Way is Essex	
2024	Made in Chelsea and The Real Housewives of Cheshire	
2025	The Real Housewives of Cheshire	
Best News Programme
Year	Winner	Ref.
2014	The Wright Stuff	
2023	ITV News at Six	
2024	Good Morning Britain	
2025	GB News - Breakfast with Eamonn & Ellie / Stephen	
Best Social Experiment Show
Year	Winner	Ref.
2011	Jamie's Dream School	
2012	Supersize vs. Superskinny	
2013	Magaluf Weekender	
2014	Big Brother	
2015	Love Island	
2017	Just Tattoo of Us	
2018	Love Island	
2021	Geordie Shore	
2022	The Cabins	
2023	Rise and Fall	
2024	Race Across the World	
2025	Virgin Island	
Best Streamed Series
Year	Winner	Ref.
2025	Smash City	
Best Streamer
Year	Winner	Ref.
2025	Kai Cenat	
Best Talk Show
Year	Winner	Ref.
2011	The Wright Stuff	
2012	The Graham Norton Show	
2013	The Wright Stuff	
2014	The Wright Stuff	
2015	The Wright Stuff	
2017	Good Morning Britain	
2018	Good Morning Britain	
2019	Good Morning Britain	
2021	Good Morning Britain	
2022	Loose Women	
2023	The Big Narstie Show	
2024	Loose Women	
2025	This Morning with Vanessa Feltz	
Most Inspiring TV Show
Year	Winner	Ref.
2011	The Model Agency	
2012	The Apprentice	
2013	The Big Reunion	
2014	The Big Reunion	
2015	The Apprentice	
2017	First Dates	
2018	Car SOS	
2019	Puppy School	
2021	Stacey Dooley: On the Psych Ward	
2022	Good Morning Britain	
2023	Loose Women	
2024	House of Sims	
2025	Geordie Stories: Nathan and Dad	
Best Performance (on a Reality TV Show)
Year	Winner	Ref.
2012	Military Wives (The Choir: Military Wives)	
2013	5ive (The Big Reunion)	
2014	Jermaine Jackman (The Voice UK)	
2015	Andrea Faustini (Xfactor)	
2017	JB Gill & Chloe Gill (Dance Dance Dance)	
2018	Debbie McGee and Giovanni Pernice (Strictly Come Dancing)	
2019	James Jordan and Alexandra Schauman (Dancing on Ice)	
2021	Jon Courtney (Britain's Got Talent)	
2022	Dane Bates Collective (The Greatest Dancer)	
2023	Nnenna King (Project Icon)	
2024	Bianca White (The Voice UK)	
2025	Stacey Leadbetter (Britain's Got Talent)	

Best Production Company
Year	Winner	Ref.
2012	RDF Television	
2013	Endemol	
2014	Wall to Wall Media	
2015	Objective Productions	
2017	Hat Trick Productions	
2018	Elephant House Studios	
2019	Elephant House Studios	
2021	Viacom International Studios UK	
2022	Viacom International Studios UK	
2023	CPL Productions	
2024	CPL Productions	
2025	CPL Productions	
Best Reality TV Judge
Year	Winner	Ref.
2011	Karren Brady (The Apprentice)	
2012	Karren Brady (The Apprentice)	
2013	Peter Jones (Dragon’s Den)	
2014	Peter Jones (Dragon’s Den)	
2015	Karren Brady (The Apprentice)	
2017	Peter Jones (Dragon’s Den)	
2018	David Walliams (Britain’s Got Talent)	
2019	Val Garland (Glow Up: Britain's Next Make-Up Star)	
2021	Touker Suleyman (Dragons' Den)	
2022	Val Garland (Glow Up: Britain's Next Make-Up Star)	
2023	Touker Suleyman (Dragons' Den)	
2024	Lord Alan Sugar (The Apprentice)	
2025	Amanda Holden (Britain's Got Talent)	
Best TV Chef
Year	Winner	Ref.
2017	Jamie Oliver	
2018	Gordon Ramsay	
2019	Gordon Ramsay	
Best TV Personality - Female
Year	Winner	Ref.
2012	Millie Mackintosh (Made in Chelsea)	
2013	Luisa Zissman (The Apprentice)	
2014	Ashleigh Coyle (Big Brother)	
2015	Karren Brady (The Apprentice)	
2017	Ampika Pickston (The Real Housewives of Cheshire)	
2018	Dani Dyer (Love Island)	
2019	Molly Mae Hague (Love Island)	
2021	Gemma Collins (Gemma Collins: Diva)	
2022	Harpreet Kaur (The Apprentice)	
2023	Nella Rose (Catfish UK)	
2024	Dianne Buswell (Strictly Come Dancing)	
Best TV Personality - Male
Year	Winner	Ref.
2012	Gareth Malone (Military Wives)	
2013	Rylan Clarke (The X Factor )	
2014	Rylan Clarke (Celebrity Big Brother)	
2015	Matthew Wright (The Wright Stuff)	
2017	Stephen Bear (Just Tattoo of Us)	
2018	David Potts (Ibiza Weekender)	
2019	Jordan Davies (Ibiza Weekender)	
2021	Thomas Skinner (The Apprentice	
2022	Abz Love (Celebs Go Dating)	
2023	Oobah Butler (Catfish UK)	
2024	Lochan Nowacki (Love Island)	
Best TV Presenter
Year	Winner	Ref.
2011	Mark Dolan (Balls of Steel)	
2012	Rick Edwards (Tool Academy)	
2013	Rick Edwards (Tool Academy)	
2014	Rick Edwards (Tool Academy)	
2015	Rylan Clark (Big Brother’s Bit On The Side)	
2017	Susanna Reid (Good Morning Britain)	
2018	Susanna Reid (Good Morning Britain)	
2019	Susanna Reid (Good Morning Britain)	
2021	Cherry Healey (10 Years Younger in 10 Days)	
2022	David Dickinson (Dickinson's Real Deal)	
2023	Anne Hegerty (Britain's Brightest Family)	
2024	Maya Jama (Love Island)	
2025	Ant & Dec	
Celebrity Personality of the Year
Year	Winner	Ref.
2011	Peter Jones	
2012	Russell Howard (ITV2)	
2013	Denise Welch (Celebrity Big Brother)	
2014	Ashley Roberts (Ant & Dec's Saturday Night Takeaway)	
2015	Alesha Dixon (Britain’s Got Talent)	
2017	Susanna Reid (Good Morning Britain)	
2018	Susanna Reid (Good Morning Britain)	
2019	Susanna Reid (Good Morning Britain)	
2021	Susanna Reid (Good Morning Britain)	
2022	Susanna Reid (Good Morning Britain)	
2023	Tim Campbell (The Apprentice)	
2024	Gemma Atkinson (Gemma and Gorka: Life Behind the Lens)	
2025	Angellica Bell (Celebrity Big Brother)	
Outstanding Contribution Award
Year	Winner	Ref.
2012	Team GB	
2012	Keith Chegwin	
2018	Simon Cowell	
2022	David Dickinson	
2025	Linda Robson	
Reality Personality of the Year
Year	Winner	Ref.
2011	Amy Childs (The Only Way is Essex)	
2012	Spencer Matthews (Made in Chelsea)	
2015	Charlotte Crosby (Geordie Shore)	
2017	Charlotte Crosby (Geordie Shore)	
2018	Bobby Norris (The Only Way Is Essex)	
2019	CiCi Coleman	
2021	Luke Mabbott (Love Island)	
2022	Katherine Louise Burn (The Apprentice)	
2023	Paris Smith (Made in Chelsea)	
2024	Kris Fade (Dubai Bling)	
2025	Ampika Pickston (The Real Housewives of Cheshire)	

== See also ==
- List of American television awards

== Official Websites ==
- Official website
