= Hey Tracey! =

British game show

- Genre: Game show
- Presented by: Joel Dommett
- Starring: Donna Preston
- Narrated by: Justin Wilkes
- Country of origin: United Kingdom
- Original language: English
- No. of series: 2
- No. of episodes: 14

Production
- Running time: 45 minutes (series 1, with adverts); 60 minutes (series 2, with adverts)

Original release
- Network: ITV2
- Release: 17 June 2019 – 16 December 2020

Hey Tracey! is a British comedy panel show that aired on ITV2 between 17 June 2019 and 16 December 2020. It is presented by Joel Dommett, and features Donna Preston as "Tracey". The show was created by format developers James Abadi and Sam Pollard, and saw celebrities phoning private businesses to ask general knowledge questions on behalf of civilians, who play the last question.

== Background and conception ==
In Spring 2016, James Abadi and Sam Pollard, who had previously co-created the format Release the Hounds, collaborated with Fremantle to co-found Dr. Pluto, an independent production company. One day, Pollard was listening to his children playing with Siri, a software-based personal assistant with a nondescript California English accent, and mooted the idea of an assistant answering back with a coarse Northern England English accent. He took the idea to Abadi, who had spent years irritating people with humorous phone calls, who responded by spending a morning calling private businesses to ask general knowledge questions.

The pair then booked a meeting with Paul Mortimer, who in 2016 was appointed ITV's head of digital channels and acquisitions, and had previously been complimentary of Release the Hounds. While there, they showed him four show formats, with Hey Tracey! his favourite. ITV announced the show in February 2019, and described Tracey as having been "thrown together by some sixth formers in the late 90's as part of their technology coursework" and "can usually be found tucking into a pie or painting her nails"; Joel Dommett was announced as host, who would later describe Tracey as "a shit Siri from Wigan". Six episodes were filmed in three days, with Dommett using a 6 April Facebook post to state that he had just finished filming.

== Format and release ==
The first episode aired on 17 June 2019. For this first series, teams of three celebrities playing on behalf of civilians attempted to find answers to questions; if they did not know, they could call Tracey, a Wigan-made personal assistant played by Donna Preston, who would give them a choice of three firms who they could ask. A wrong answer throws play over to the other team, while a correct answer won the celebrities the next question and the civilian a small prize; Dommett used a June 2019 interview with the Irish News to note that they had given a trailer to a contestant who did not own a car, a kayak to a contestant who "lived nowhere near water", and a contestant who "lived on the second floor" three "massive" bags of gravel. After four questions, the civilian whose teams' turn it is is asked the fifth question for £2,500. The show was successful enough to be commissioned for a second series in January 2020; in March 2020, the United Kingdom went into lockdown due to COVID-19, which meant that most studio recordings paused, with Hey Tracey! one of the first shows to return after lockdown.

For the second series, players sat in separate chairs two metres away, instead of at a desk, and programmes were lengthened to an hour, with play passing back and forth regardless of answer; questions were worth £250, £250, £750, £750, £1,500 and £1,500 respectively, and the team with the most money played the final question. Prizes for this series included a pet food dispenser, vegan condoms, a night in a haunted pub, and snail and garlic flavour crisps. Preston would later play "The Mistress" in the station's Apocalypse Wow, while Dommett would later present The Masked Singer for ITV1. In late 2021, after Christine McGuinness published her autobiography, Hey Tracey! made headlines after it became apparent that she was talking about the show and Preston when describing her mortification from comments made during a game show appearance; Preston later apologised to her via social media. Preston's comments later resurfaced after it was announced that she would appear on Scared of the Dark and then again shortly after she appeared on the 2025 run of Celebrity Big Brother.

== Transmissions ==
Series	Start date	End date	Episodes
1	17 June 2019	22 July 2019	6
2	5 October 2020	16 December 2020	8

== Episodes ==
=== Series 1 (2019) ===
Episode	First broadcast	Guests
1x01	17 June 2019	Georgia Steel, Chris Ramsey, Charlotte Crosby, Joe Swash, Luisa Zissman, and Luke Kempner
1x02	24 June 2019	Dane Baptiste, Nina Nesbitt, Jack Fincham, Melvin Odoom, Charlotte Dawson, and Tom Read Wilson
1x03	1 July 2019	Stephen Bailey, Eyal Booker, Ferne McCann, Tanya Bardsley, Jordan Davies, and London Hughes
1x04	8 July 2019	Matt Edmondson, Sair Khan, Sam Thompson, Kem Cetinay, Desiree Burch, and Scarlett Moffatt
1x05	15 July 2019	Megan Barton-Hanson, Roman Kemp, Lady Leshurr, Stephen Bear, Naughty Boy, and Melody Thornton
1x06	22 July 2019	Joey Essex, Amber Davies, Arron Crascall, Frankie Bridge, AJ Odudu, and Russell Kane

=== Series 2 (2020) ===
Episode	First broadcast	Guests
2x01	5 October 2020	Megan McKenna, Roman Kemp, Mark-Francis Vandelli, Melvin Odoom, Verona Rose, and Christine McGuinness
2x02	12 October 2020	Russell Kane, Paige Turley, Radzi Chinyanganya, Jorgie Porter, David Potts, and Suzi Ruffell
2x03	19 October 2020	Dane Baptiste, Judi Love, Max and Harvey, Chris Taylor, and Dawn Ward
2x04	26 October 2020	Bobby Norris, Rita Simons, Ellie Taylor, Darren Harriott, Jordan North, and Tallia Storm
2x05	2 November 2020	Frankie Bridge, Matt Richardson, Vick Hope, Amy Hart, Tom Green, and Myles Stephenson
2x06	9 November 2020	Bobby Mair, Harriet Kemsley, Hannah Cooper, AJ Odudu, Jordan Davies, and Wes Nelson
2x07	16 November 2020	Max George, Nigel Ng, Amelia Lily, Georgia Steel, Helen Bauer, and Will Manning
2x08	16 December 2020	Seann Walsh, Baga Chipz, Curtis Pritchard, Tom Lucy, Samira Mighty, and AJ Pritchard
