= Joel Dommett =

English actor and comedian (born 1985)

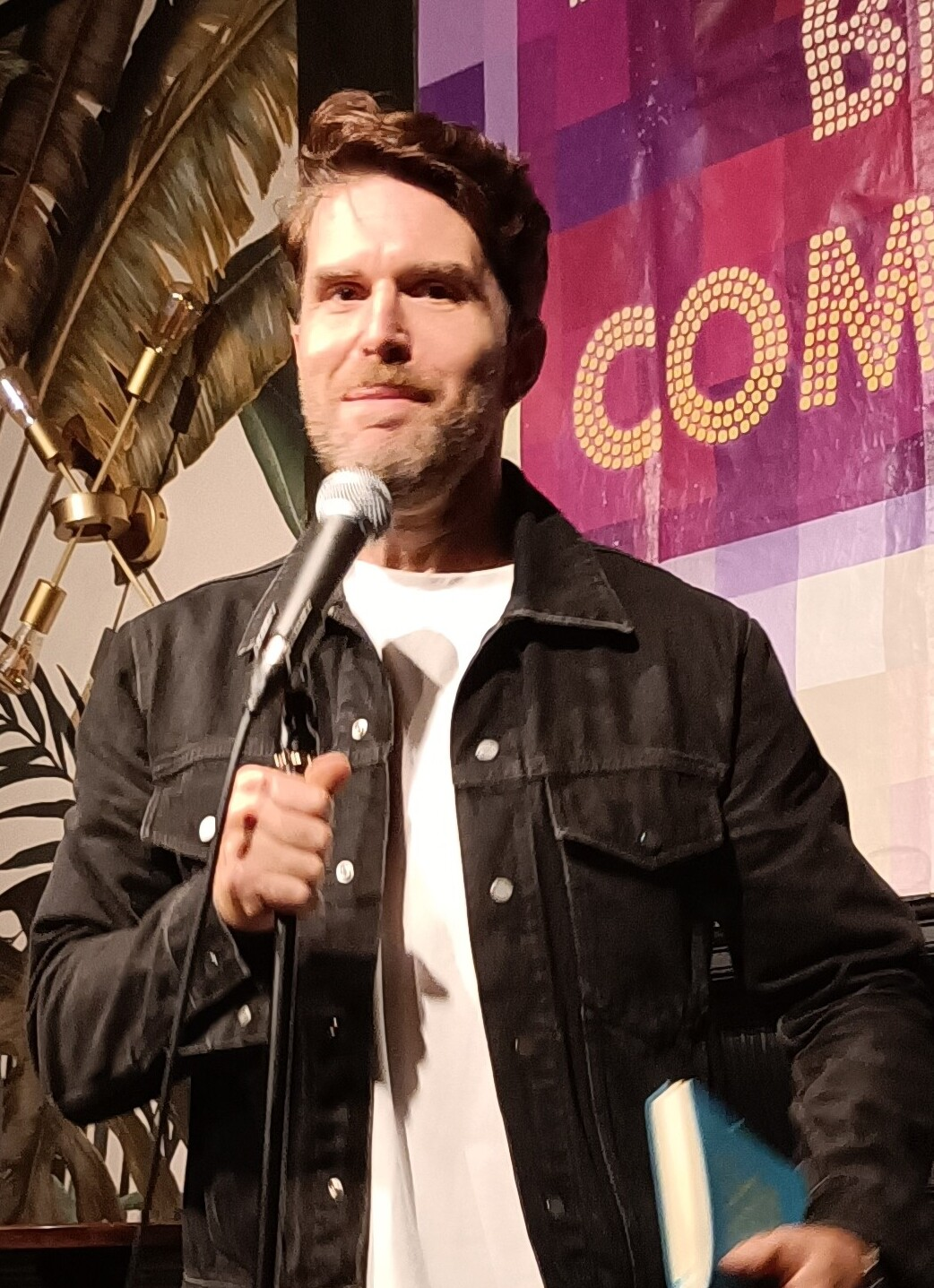
- Dommett in 2022
- Born: Joel Patrick Dommett; 8 June 1985 (age 41); Rockhampton, Gloucestershire, England
- Occupations: Comedian; television presenter; actor
- Years active: 2004–present
- Spouse: Hannah Cooper (m. 2019)
- Children: 2
- Website: Official website

Joel Patrick Dommett (born 8 June 1985) is an English comedian, television presenter and actor. After beginning his career as an actor, and appearing in various television shows including Casualty and Skins, he embarked on stand-up comedy and television presenting and became known for his television roles in Live in Chelsea (2011–2012) and Impractical Jokers (2012–2014).

Dommett was a contestant on I'm a Celebrity...Get Me Out of Here! in 2016 and went on to present the spin-off show I'm a Celebrity: Extra Camp (2017–2019) and I'm a Celebrity: Unpacked (2024–2025) as well as an array of other shows including Hey Tracey! (2019–2020), The Masked Singer (2020–present), The Masked Dancer (2021–2022), the National Television Awards (2021–present), In With a Shout (2023–2024) and Survivor (2023).

== Early life ==
Joel Patrick Dommett was born on 8 June 1985 in Rockhampton, Gloucestershire, and attended The Castle School in Thornbury. As a teenager he was a member of a nu metal band called Psirus, which played five shows. He moved to London at the age of 19.

== Career ==
Before stand-up comedy, Dommett did some minor acting roles such as the roles of Josh in Teenage Kicks (2008), Jonathon Hansel in Casualty (2004) and Dale in The Golden Hour (2005). In 2005 and in 2007, respectively, Dommett acted in the Rikki Beadle-Blair plays Bashment and Stonewall.

His first stand-up gig was at a bar in Los Angeles, and he has since performed in locations including Reykjavík, Gravesend and The Netherlands. In 2008, he won Best Newcomer award and was a finalist in Stand Up Comedian of the year. His breakthrough performance was on the comedy current affairs show Russell Howard's Good News in April 2011. In his appearance, Dommett performed towards the end of the show in the stand-up section.

In 2008, he had a role as 'Train Soldier' in the feature film The Edge of Love but later discovered his scene had been cut.

In 2009, he was a co-host on Paul Foot's podcast from episode 1–20. Dommett was a member of the National Youth Theatre.

In 2010, Dommett appeared in a recurring role in E4's Skins as D.C. Sweeney and appeared in all six episodes of Popatron, a sitcom produced by Charlie Brooker's Zeppotron that appeared on BBC Two as part of its BBC Switch brand. Beginning in 2011, Dommett hosted Live in Chelsea, a live discussion show revolving around the events of the popular reality show Made in Chelsea. Dommett appeared in the first two series of Impractical Jokers UK from 2012 until 2014 on BBC Three.

In 2015, Dommett was a team captain on ITV2's comedy show Reality Bites. He was also a regular panellist on Nicole Scherzinger's team on the Sky 1 panel show Bring the Noise. In November 2015, Dommett appeared on a celebrity edition of The Chase.

In 2016, Dommett was cast in the Fulwell 73 film White Island, based on Colin Butts' third and final novel, A Bus Could Run You Over. He played the character of Dexter Ward, a DJ and friend of the protagonist, who is arrested for drug possession in Ibiza. The film was not a commercial success.

In November 2016, Dommett took part in the sixteenth series of I'm a Celebrity...Get Me Out of Here! and finished in second place, losing out to Gogglebox's Scarlett Moffatt.

In 2018, Dommett released his first book of memoirs, It's Not Me It's Them: Confessions of a hopeless modern romantic. The book details his romantic encounters with 40 women before meeting his now wife, Hannah Cooper, and has the running narrative that he is on his first date with her and is recalling the women that he had relationships with. Towards the final page of the book, Dommett asks Cooper whether she would want to marry him.

From November 2017 until December 2019, Dommett co-presented I'm a Celebrity: Extra Camp on ITV2. The aftershow was axed in January 2020 due to it becoming too expensive to film.

In 2019, Dommett began presenting the quiz show Hey Tracey! alongside Donna Preston, who plays the computer-generated Tracey, and the reality dating show Singletown alongside Emily Atack, both on ITV2. Singletown only lasted one series, while Hey Tracey! was cancelled following its second series filmed during the COVID-19 pandemic.

On 9 September 2019, Dommett was announced as the presenter for ITV's The Masked Singer, the British version of the international music game show Masked Singer, which began airing on 4 January 2020. Dommett also hosted the sister show The Masked Dancer from 2021-2022.

In 2020, Dommett was scheduled to go on tour across the UK in his Unapologetic: (If That Is Ok?) stand-up comedy tour, although that was postponed to 2021 and 2022. Only a few shows in February and early March were performed before a nationwide March lockdown was imposed; the show was themed around Dommett's new marriage and his newfound primetime television presenting roles.

On 9 September 2021, Dommett hosted the 2021 National Television Awards ceremony. He was on the long list for the best presenter award but failed to make the final shortlist.

In February 2023, it was confirmed that he would present the BBC's revival of Survivor. In May 2023, he began presenting the Telly Addicts–styled ITV game show In With a Shout.

In May 2025, Dommett joined BBC Radio 2 covering The Saturday Show for Romesh Ranganathan. He also covers for other presenters including Vernon Kays weekday mid-morning show, Saturday Breakfast with Dermot O'Leary and Rylan Clark-Neil. In August 2026, Dommett presented Drivetime for two weeks following former host Sara Cox moving to present The Sara Cox Breakfast Show on the station.

In 2025, it was announced that Dommett would host the 2025 National Television Awards on 10 September 2025 at The O2 in London. The event was broadcast live on ITV1, ITVX, STV and STV Player.

In January 2026, Dommett was announced as a contestant on the twenty-first series of Taskmaster.

== Personal life ==
Dommett married Hannah Cooper in 2019. The couple began their relationship in 2016 after she sent him a "cat with the heart eye emoji" (😻) in an Instagram direct message. They have two sons, born in 2023 and 2026.

In April 2022, Dommett and Cooper launched their podcast Never Have I Ever on Global Player.

In September 2023, Dommett became an official patron for Shooting Star Children's Hospice.

== Filmography ==
=== Film and theatre ===
Year	Title	Role	Notes
2005	Totally Practically Naked...	Dylan	
2007	Stonewall	Matty Dean	
2008	Brendan At The Chelsea	Don	Original cast
2008	The Edge of Love	Train Soldier	Feature film
2010	Bashment	J.J.	Feature film
2016	White Island	Dexter Ward	Feature film

=== Television ===
Year	Title	Role	Network
2004	Casualty	Jonathon Hansell	BBC One
2005	The Golden Hour	Dale Harper	ITV
2005	Totally Frank	Cory	Channel 4
2006	Brick It		Digital media
2007	Inspector Lynley	Josh Tyler	BBC One
2007	Signs of Life	Joe	BBC One
2007	Up Close and Personal		ITV2; Non-broadcast pilot
2008	Teenage Kicks	Josh	ITV
2010	Popatron	Toby Wood	BBC Two
2010	Skins	DC Sweeney	E4
2011	Russell Howard's Good News Extra	Guest	BBC Three
2011	Pop's Greatest Dance Crazes	Contributor	BBC Three
2011	EMA Voices 2011	Presenter	MTV
2011–2012	Live in Chelsea	Presenter	4oD
2012	How to Survive a Disaster Movie	Co-presenter	Channel 5
2012	MTV News	Newsreader	MTV
2012	World's Greatest Body Shockers	Contributor	E4
2012–2014	Impractical Jokers UK	"Joker"	BBC Three
2013	Sweat the Small Stuff	Guest	BBC Three
2014	The Dog Ate My Homework	Guest	CBBC
2015	Reality Bites	Team captain	ITV2
2015	Bring the Noise	Regular panellist	Sky One
2015–2017	Drunk History	Storyteller	Comedy Central
2016	World of Weird	Co-presenter	Channel 4
2016	The Chase Celebrity Special	Contestant	ITV
2016	I'm a Celebrity...Get Me Out of Here!	Contestant, 2nd place	ITV
2017	Loose Women	Guest panellist, 1 episode	ITV
2017	8 Out of 10 Cats	Panellist	Channel 4
2017–2018	Joel & Nish vs the World	Co-presenter	Comedy Central
2017–2019	I'm a Celebrity: Extra Camp	Co-presenter	ITV2
2017–2025	The Great British Bake Off: An Extra Slice	Panellist	Channel 4
2018	Gemma Collins: Diva España	Narrator	ITVBe
2018	Celebrity Lego Masters at Christmas	Contestant	Channel 4
2018	Celebrity Call Centre - Stand Up to Cancer	Call Centre Agent	Channel 4
2018–2019	Roast Battle	Contestant episode 5	Comedy Central
2018–2022	Celebrity Juice	Guest	ITV2
2019	Comedians of the World	Comedian	Netflix
2019	Pointless Celebrities	Contestant with James Acaster	BBC One
2019	The Stand-Up Sketch Show	Comedian	ITV2
2019	Through the Keyhole	Panellist	ITV
2019	Thronecast: Gameshow of Thrones	Panellist	Sky Atlantic
2019	Comedy Bus	Co-presenter	Comedy Central
2019	Singletown	Co-presenter	ITV2
2019–2020	Hey Tracey!	Presenter	ITV2
2020	Home alone with Joel Dommett	Presenter	ITV2
2020	The Chase Celebrity Special	Contestant	ITV
2020	Celebrity Crystal Maze	Contestant	Channel 4
2020–present	The Masked Singer	Presenter	ITV
2021–2022	The Masked Dancer	Presenter	ITV
2021–present	National Television Awards	Presenter	ITV
2021	The Love Trap	Presenter	Channel 4
2021, 2023	The Wheel	Celebrity Expert	BBC One
2022	DNA Journey	Himself with Tom Allen	ITV
2022	Celebrity I Literally Just Told You	Contestant	Channel 4
2023	Celebrity Catchphrase	Contestant	ITV
2023	This Morning	Guest presenter	ITV
2023	RuPaul's Drag Race UK	Guest judge (Series 5)	BBC Three
2023	Survivor	Presenter	BBC One
2023	Strictly Come Dancing	Terms & Conditions reader	BBC One
2023–present	Comic Relief	Presenter	BBC One
2023–2024	In with a Shout	Presenter	ITV
2024	Lorraine	Guest presenter	ITV
2024–2025	I'm a Celebrity: Unpacked	Co-presenter	ITV2
2025	Gladiators Celebrity Special	Contestant	BBC One
2025	Doctor Who	Himself (Episode: "Lucky Day")	BBC One
2025	Who Wants to Be a Millionaire?	Contestant	ITV
2025	RuPaul's Drag Race UK	Guest judge (Series 7)	BBC Three
2026	Taskmaster	Contestant (Series 21)	Channel 4
2026	Celebrity Sabotage	Presenter/Celebrity Saboteur	ITV
2026	Summer Unboxed with Maisie and Joel	Co-presenter with Maisie Adam	Channel 4
