= Impractical Jokers UK =

- Series 2 title card (BBC Three)
- Also known as: Impractical Jokers
- Genre: Reality
- Based on: Impractical Jokers
- Starring: Paul McCaffrey; Joel Dommett; Marek Larwood; Roisin Conaty; Lee Griffiths; Matt Ralph; Paul Biggin; David Moon
- Narrated by: Laura Jackson; Vikki Stone; Matt Edmondson
- Country of origin: United Kingdom
- Original language: English
- No. of series: 3
- No. of episodes: 21 (list of episodes)

Production
- Camera setup: Hidden camera
- Running time: 30 minutes (inc. adverts)
- Production company: Yalli Productions

Original release
- Network: BBC Three (2012–2014); Comedy Central (2016); Channel 5 (2016)
- Release: 15 November 2012 – 17 December 2016

Impractical Jokers UK is a British reality television series that first aired in the United Kingdom in 2012 on BBC Three. The series is based on the American hidden camera-practical joke reality television series Impractical Jokers. Throughout the show they challenge their friends to do and to say embarrassing things to an unsuspecting public.

The first two series of the show aired on BBC Three in 2012 and 2014, featuring Paul McCaffrey, Joel Dommett, Marek Larwood, and Roisin Conaty.

In April 2015, Channel 5 and Comedy Central announced a new series starring Lee Griffiths, Matt Ralph, Paul Biggin, and David Moon, replacing the previous four comedians. Matt Edmondson is the narrator.

== Format ==
Before every challenge, the guys explain where they are, what the challenge is, and what will happen if they fail. There is a mic placed on the cast member performing the prank. There are also hidden cameras near the area to capture the action. The location in which the challenge takes place is usually a public area such as a park, shopping centre, or store. The criteria of each challenge are the same for each of the jokers competing in the round. If the joker cannot complete their task, they get a Thumbs-Down. At the end of the episode, the joker(s) with the most thumbs down is punished, and the punishments are usually more embarrassing, humiliating, disgusting, painful or scary than any of the challenges. Punishments cannot be refused, or the joker will be kicked off the show.

== Episodes ==
Series	Episodes	Originally released	
Series	Episodes	First released	Last released
1	6	15 November 2012	20 December 2012
2	6	24 February 2014	2 April 2014
3	9	2 August 2016	17 December 2016

Before every challenge, there is a hidden camera and mic placed on the cast-member performing the prank. The location in which the challenge takes place is usually a public area such as a high street or store. Although the criteria of each challenge is the same for each of the four comedians.

=== BBC Three (2012–2014) ===
Two series of Impractical Jokers UK aired on BBC Three in 2012 and 2014, featuring comedians Paul McCaffrey, Joel Dommett, Marek Larwood, and Roisin Conaty.

=== Channel 5/Comedy Central (2016) ===
For the third and final series, the show starred Lee Griffiths, Matt Ralph, Paul Biggin, and David Moon with Matt Edmondson providing the voiceover.

Robert Gray, director of Yalli Productions said: "We were thrilled to be making Impractical Jokers UK with Comedy Central UK. Lee, Matt, David and Paul have known each other for 12 years."

== Reception ==
Unlike its American counterpart, Impractical Jokers UK received generally negative reviews from both critics and audiences, with the main criticism being its failure to recapture the spirit and charisma of the original series. VultureHound's Laura Zoe Fleming gave it a 1/5, saying that while it is very similar to its American counterpart, the show seems too forced and the jokes are not funny at all. She added, "The four jokers, although, funny at times, just don't have the chemistry that is needed to make something like this work, it just makes watching it very cringey and leaves you finding yourself staring at the wall for the rest of the show because it's less painful to watch."
