= List of Impractical Jokers UK episodes =

Impractical Jokers UK is a British hidden camera-practical joke reality television series that premiered on BBC Three on 15 November 2012. It follows the four members of the comedy troupe as they coerce one another into doing public pranks while being filmed by hidden cameras.

== Series overview ==
Series	Episodes	Originally released	
Series	Episodes	First released	Last released
1	6	15 November 2012	20 December 2012
2	6	24 February 2014	2 April 2014
3	9	2 August 2016	17 December 2016

== Episodes ==
=== Series 1 (2012) ===
No. overall	No. in season	Title	Losing Joker(s)	Original release date
1	1	"Episode 1"	Marek	15 November 2012
The jokers work in a Citroën showroom, and invade people's space when working as hairdressers.
2	2	"Episode 2"	Joel	22 November 2012
The jokers offer free massages to the public, and attempt to join conversations with random strangers.
3	3	"Episode 3"	TBA	29 November 2012
The jokers are forced to use unusual words in a library, and attempt to work as nightclub bouncers.
4	4	"Episode 4"	TBA	6 December 2012
The jokers are in Scotland, and they attempt to convince random strangers to taking a ridiculous amount of photos of them.
5	5	"Episode 5"	TBA	13 December 2012
The jokers run a focus group, presenting a slideshow created by the other jokers about their autobiography.
6	6	"Episode 6"	TBA	20 December 2012
The jokers are in a shopping centre and analyse shoppers handwriting, and become unhelpful tourist guides.

=== Series 2 (2014) ===
No. overall	No. in season	Title	Losing Joker(s)	Original release date
7	1	"Episode 1"	Joel	24 February 2014
The jokers cause mayhem when working at a bakery, and even have to resent to licking customers' toes at a foot spa.
8	2	"Episode 2"	Marek	3 March 2014
The jokers roam a local park where they attempt to trade embarrassing secrets to passers by.
9	3	"Episode 3"	TBA	10 March 2014
The jokers spend the day as opticians who offer very unusual eye tests.
10	4	"Episode 4"	TBA	19 March 2014
The jokers have to follow embarrassing instructions when working at a cinema snack bar.
11	5	"Episode 5"	TBA	26 March 2014
The jokers take turns to work behind the counter and serve food at a fast food chicken restaurant.
12	6	"Episode 6"	TBA	2 April 2014
The jokers try to convince random strangers that they've met them before, at the most bizarre events.

=== Series 3 (2016) ===
No. overall	No. in season	Title	Losing Joker(s)	Original release date
13	1	"Episode 1"	Paul	2 August 2016
14	2	"Episode 2"	David	9 August 2016
15	3	"Episode 3"	Matt	16 August 2016
16	4	"Episode 4"	David	23 August 2016
17	5	"Episode 5"	Lee	27 August 2016
18	6	"Episode 6"	Paul	10 September 2016
19	7	"Episode 7"	Lee	19 November 2016
20	8	"Episode 8"	Matt	10 December 2016
21	9	"Episode 9"	Lee	17 December 2016
