= Virgin Island (TV series) =

British television series

- Genre: Reality
- Presented by: Danielle Harel and Celeste Hirschman
- Narrated by: Lucy Beaumont
- Country of origin: United Kingdom
- Original language: English
- No. of series: 2
- No. of episodes: 14

Production
- Running time: 47 minutes (inc. adverts)
- Production company: Double Act Productions

Original release
- Network: Channel 4
- Release: 12 May 2025 – present

Virgin Island is a British reality television series that premiered on Channel 4 on 12 May 2025.

Series 1 contained six episodes, following twelve adult virgins as they explore intimacy, relationships, and personal growth while living together on an island retreat. "Obonjan Island", a private island in Croatia, was used as the filming location for both series. It is produced by Double Act Productions for Channel 4.

On 13 June 2025, Channel 4 announced a second series. It aired between April 27, 2026 and May 18, 2026, and contained 8 episodes. Channel 4 is currently casting for a possible 3rd series.

A distinctive element of the series is its integration of relationship coaching and somatic therapy, led by sexologists Danielle Harel and Celeste Hirschman, co-founders of the Somatica Institute. Their therapeutic approach introduces structured exercises that address emotional intimacy, attachment patterns, sexual authenticity, and communication skills.

Rebecca Nicholson, writing for the Guardian, called it "surprisingly empathetic." As of November 2026, the series has won three industry awards, and has been nominated for a BAFTA Award for Best Reality Show.

== Format ==
Virgin Island combines reality television elements with professional intimacy coaching, allowing participants to work through personal challenges, emotional blocks, and intimacy issues in real-time. The series prioritises authentic personal development over traditional competition-based eliminations.

Participants undergo guided exercises based on the Somatica Method, a modality co-developed by Harel and Hirschman that integrates somatic awareness, emotional intelligence, and sexuality coaching. These sessions include:

- Emotional vulnerability training
- Communication and consent exercises
- Relational trauma exploration
- Erotic authenticity development
- Touch and embodied intimacy work

Participants are continually evaluated for personal growth opportunities and emotional readiness.

== Presenters ==
Danielle Harel (PhD, Clinical Sexology) and Celeste Hirschman (MA, Human Sexuality) are the programme's lead intimacy experts. Their presence introduces a therapeutic element uncommon in reality television formats. Throughout the series, Harel and Hirschman facilitate emotionally charged coaching sessions with cast members, addressing topics such as:

- Overcoming shame around sexuality
- Identifying attachment wounds
- Increasing comfort with emotional intimacy
- Developing embodied awareness and touch comfort
- Reframing relational dynamics for healthier partnerships

Comedian Lucy Beaumont narrates both series

Their work has been widely covered by media outlets including Washington Post, Sunday Times, GQ, the Telegraph, and the Guardian.

== Episodes ==
=== Series 1 (2025) ===
No. overall	No. in series	Title	Running time	Original release date
1	1	"Desire"	47 minutes	12 May 2025
The group of 12 participants arrive at the Croatian retreat, meet the experts and learn about hands-on therapy.
2	2	"Touch"	47 minutes	12 May 2025
Touch therapy begins. Can the 'animal game' ignite the group's sexual impulses? Ben faces rejection when he develops feelings for a fellow participant, Taylor struggles with her feelings towards men and women, and Jason attempts to overcome his fear of hugging.
3	3	"Confidence"	47 minutes	19 May 2025
The group dives into confidence work. After suffering rejection in a group workshop, Ben feels lower than ever. Can intimacy expert Joy help him get out of his head and back in the dating game? Taylor discovers her true self. Emma reveals a buried secret, and unburdened, enjoys a date with Viraj. Tom goes on his own voyage of self-discovery.
4	4	"The Body"	47 minutes	19 May 2025
In a workshop, the participants are asked to strip off and face themselves in the mirror. The experience encourages Charlotte to drop her confident exterior. Zac tries to impress the girls by dishing out compliments. And Dave takes on a series of sexual firsts with surrogate partner Kat.
5	5	"Orgasm"	47 minutes	26 May 2025
The group learns about masturbation and orgasms. Emma confronts shame, Pia reclaims her body, and Zac finds out the hard way that sex can be complicated.
6	6	"Escalation"	47 minutes	26 May 2025
On their final day, the participants reflect on their transformations. Charlotte explores dominance, Ben faces his nudity phobia and Dave celebrates his growth.

=== Series 2 (2026) ===
No. overall	No. in series	Title	Running time	Original release date
7	1	"Shame"	47 minutes	27 April 2026
The group meet for the first time and begin to unpack their deepest fears and anxieties. Can any of them really open up?
8	2	"Core Desires"	47 minutes	28 April 2026
The course content escalates. The group explore turn-ons and surrogate partner therapy. Alex gets to grips with his erection issues. And Marianne works on her trust issues.
9	3	"Dating"	47 minutes	4 May 2026
It's the Dating Phase of the course. As some of the virgins work to overcome their anxieties, Tegan struggles for self-acceptance. But for two members sparks really start to fly.
10	4	"Nudity"	47 minutes	5 May 2026
It's the Nudity Phase as the virgins get familiar with genital anatomy. And Tegan takes a big step forwards with Risdon, experiencing connection through touch like never before.
11	5	"Play Time"	47 minutes	11 May 2026
It's time for the Playtime phase. The virgins are encouraged to explore their sexual fantasies and embrace their kinky side - from submission and dominance to bondage and impact play.
12	6	"Technique"	47 minutes	12 May 2026
The group explore basics and intimacy. They practice kissing. Ellen gets naked. A kink session unlocks Millie's desires. An islander comes out. And another loses their virginity.
13	7	"Seduction"	47 minutes	18 May 2026
As the group learn the art of seduction in the penultimate phase, Jason lowers his guard, Ellen continues to flourish, and the number of ex-virgins is set to increase.
14	8	"Climax"	47 minutes	18 May 2026
As the retreat concludes, Bertie heads for the bedroom with Kat for the lesson of a lifetime. Katie and Callum get together. And has Marianne finally overcome her mistrust of men?

== Production ==
Virgin Island was commissioned as part of Channel 4's initiative to explore the intersection of reality television, intimacy, and personal development. It was based on a University College London study that showed that one in eight 26-year-olds are still virgins, compared to one in 20 in previous generations.

The series is produced by Double Act Productions, in collaboration with the Somatica Institute, which assisted in casting and filming to ensure participants were prepared for the emotional depth of the programme.

The first series premiered in May 2025, with all episodes airing on Channel 4 and streaming on the Channel 4 digital platform.

== Reception ==
Since its release, Virgin Island has generated significant media attention, balancing both praise and controversy. Critics have commended the series for breaking new ground in reality television, being de-shaming, highlighting societal pressures around sex, and forcing the subject of intimacy into the spotlight. Others have raised ethical discussions regarding the use of therapeutic interventions within an entertainment format.

The series has also made headlines for its depiction of surrogate partner therapy - a type of therapy wherein a trained surrogate partner assists a client in addressing their intimacy issues with a talk therapist on hand to help guide both the client and surrogate through the process.

The series has also been described as "emotionally naked" and "deeply authentic," with strong audience engagement among viewers.

The programme is Channel 4's biggest new unscripted series launch for 16-34 year-olds since modern records began, and has been streamed almost 11 million times.

=== Awards ===
Virgin Island has received the following industry awards:

- Broadcast Awards 2026 – Best Factual Entertainment Programme
- National Reality Television Awards 2025 – Best Social Experiment Show 2025
- Grierson Award 2026 - Best Constructed and Formatted Documentary Series
