= Christine McGuinness =

English model and television personality (born 1988)

- McGuinness at the 2026 British Academy Television Awards in London, England
- Born: Christine Martin; 20 March 1988 (age 38); Blackpool, Lancashire, England
- Occupations: Model; novelist; television personality
- Television: The Real Housewives of Cheshire (2018–2020)
- Spouse: Paddy McGuinness (m. 2011; div. 2024)
- Children: 3

Christine McGuinness (née Martin; born 20 March 1988) is an English model, television personality and former beauty queen. She appeared on the ITVBe reality series The Real Housewives of Cheshire between 2018 and 2020 and has appeared on other television series such as The Real Full Monty and The Games. In 2021, she took part in a BBC documentary alongside her then-husband Paddy to raise awareness about autism.

== Early life and career ==
McGuinness was born in Blackpool on 20 March 1988 and suffered sexual abuse at the hands of a family member, while her father was a heroin addict. She began her career as a "beauty queen", entered various pageants and was named Miss Liverpool in 2007. Alongside her husband, McGuinness appeared on Who Wants to Be a Millionaire? and All Star Mr & Mrs in 2012. From 2018 to 2020, she appeared as a cast member on The Real Housewives of Cheshire. McGuinness has since appeared on a number of television shows including Loose Women, Steph's Packed Lunch, Hey Tracey!, This Morning and Good Morning Britain. In November 2021, she released her autobiography A Beautiful Nightmare: My Story. In December 2021, she appeared on Strictly The Real Full Monty and in 2022 she was a contestant on the sports television competition The Games. In 2022, McGuinness started a podcast with her then-husband, Table Talk with Paddy and Christine McGuinness.

== Personal life ==
Christine married actor, comedian and presenter Paddy McGuinness in June 2011. The couple have a twin girl and boy and a younger daughter. Christine is autistic, as are her three children. They took part in a documentary, Paddy and Christine McGuinness: Our Family and Autism. The couple announced their separation in July 2022.

== Selected works ==
McGuinness, Christine (2021). A beautiful nightmare: my story. London. ISBN 9781913406714.

== Television ==
Television work by year
Year	Title	Role	Notes
2012	Who Wants to Be a Millionaire?	Herself	with Paddy McGuinness
2012	All Star Mr & Mrs	Herself	with Paddy McGuinness
2017–2021	Loose Women	Herself	Guest appearances
2018–2020	The Real Housewives of Cheshire	Herself	Cast member, 25 episodes
2020	Hey Tracey!	Herself	Guest
2021	Steph's Packed Lunch	Herself	Guest
2021	Paddy and Christine McGuinness: Our Family and Autism	Herself	Documentary
2021	The Real Full Monty	Herself	Contestant, 2 episodes
2022	The Games	Herself	Contestant, 5 episodes
2023	Christine McGuinness: Unmasking My Autism	Herself	Documentary
2024	Pilgrimage: the Road through North Wales	Herself	Participant, 3 episodes
2024	Celebrity MasterChef	Herself	Participant, 1 episode
2025	Celebrity Hunted	Herself	Participant

== Awards and nominations ==
Awards and nominations
Year	Award	Category	Work	Result	Ref.
2022	27th National Television Awards	Authored Documentary	Paddy and Christine McGuinness: Our Family and Autism	Nominated	
2023	28th National Television Awards	Authored Documentary	Christine McGuinness: Unmasking My Autism	Nominated	
2023	National Diversity Awards	Celebrity of the Year	Christine McGuinness: Unmasking My Autism	Won	
