= The Real Housewives of Cheshire =

British reality television programme

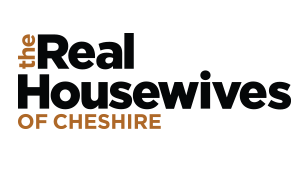
- Genre: Reality
- Based on: The Real Housewives
- Presented by: Brian Dowling (s. 3–11, 14–)
- Starring: Current: Ampika Pickston; Lauren Simon; Seema Malhotra; Rachel Lugo; Sheena Lynch; Paige Chohan
- Country of origin: United Kingdom
- Original language: English
- No. of series: 19
- No. of episodes: 210 (list of episodes)

Production
- Executive producers: Sarah Dillistone; David Granger; Daran Little; Will Macdonald; Sean Murphy; Mike Swindells
- Production locations: Cheshire; Greater Manchester
- Running time: 42–45 minutes
- Production company: Monkey Kingdom

Original release
- Network: ITVBe (2015–2025); ITV2 (2026–)
- Release: 12 January 2015 – present

Related
- The Real Housewives of Jersey; The Real Housewives of London

The Real Housewives of Cheshire (abbreviated RHOCheshire) is a British reality television programme that premiered on ITVBe on 12 January 2015. Developed as the first British instalment in The Real Housewives franchise, it has aired 19 series and focuses on the personal and professional lives of several women living in or around Cheshire, England.

The current cast for Series 19 consists of Ampika Pickston, Lauren Simon, Seema Malhotra, Rachel Lugo, Sheena Lynch and Paige Chohan.

== Overview and production ==
=== Series 1–4 ===
On 22 September 2014, ITV announced the cast for Britain's first Real Housewives instalment, The Real Housewives of Cheshire. Starring Ampika Pickston, Dawn Ward, Lauren Simon, Leanne Brown, Magali Gorré and Tanya Bardsley, the series follows the cast's intertwining and fast lives in the rich communities of Cheshire and Greater Manchester. ITV had planned to profile the glamorous denizens of London's Knightsbridge in the series, but ITV bosses said "their homes weren't quite big enough..", and so Cheshire was chosen.

After the success of the first series, with the premiere becoming ITVBe's second highest rated programme ever behind The Only Way Is Essex, on 27 April 2015, it was announced that a second series had been commissioned, with filming to begin in May 2015. The second series aired from 7 September 2015 to 9 November 2015, with the cast from the first series all returning.

On 1 March 2016, it was announced that Gorré would be departing the series, although a return in future was not ruled out. Three days later, the network announced that Ward, Simon, Pickston, Brown and Bardsley would all be returning for a third series along with three new wives, Missé Beqiri, Seema Malhotra and Stacey Forsey. The third series premiered on 4 April 2016. Three weeks later, Bardsley confirmed that the third series would have a reunion show, a first since the show's inception. On 19 May 2016, it was announced that Irish television presenter, Brian Dowling, would be hosting the reunion show. The reunion was filmed at Peckforton Castle in Cheshire in late May and aired on 13 June 2016, concluding the third series.

On 8 June 2016, a week before the airing of the reunion for the third series, it was announced that the show would be returning for a fourth series. It was also revealed that all the housewives from the third series would be returning. Filming for the fourth series commenced on 1 July 2016 and the following month, a small teaser was broadcast on ITVBe that revealed the fourth series would premiere on 5 September 2016. The fourth series' reunion was filmed at the same location as the third series' reunion, at Peckforton Castle in Cheshire. The reunion aired on 8 November 2016.

=== Series 5–8 ===
On 3 January 2017, it was announced that the show had been renewed for both a fifth and sixth series, with both airing in 2017. Filming for the fifth series began in late January. On 13 February 2017, it was revealed that the fifth series would premiere on 27 March 2017. It was also announced that Beqiri would not be returning in a main housewife role, in order to allow her to take a step back and focus on her relationship but would appear in a smaller capacity. Former housewife, Gorré commented on the upcoming series, stating "I have heard there is a new cast member and she is more Geordie Shore than Golden Triangle." On 21 March 2017, Ester Dohnalová was announced to be the new housewife for the fifth series. Subsequently, on 28 April 2017, Beqiri announced the fifth series would be her last. The fifth series did not have a reunion show, and instead featured host Dowling visiting the housewives' homes in a special, titled "At Home with the Real Housewives of Cheshire".

On 9 July 2017, Simon exclusively revealed that filming for the sixth series had begun. Later that month, original housewife, Pickston, announced her departure from the series after six seasons. It was exclusively announced on an ITVBe advert that two new housewives would be joining the show, alongside the returning seven housewives. The sixth series premiered on 11 September 2017, with Rachel Lugo and Nermina Pieters-Mekic joining the cast. Lugo's identical twin sister, Katie Kane appeared in a recurring capacity, whilst the cast filmed in Gibraltar.

On 10 February 2018, Brown confirmed her exit from the show, ahead of the seventh season, due to her ongoing legal battle with former friend and co-star, Ward. She stated her intention to never appear on the show again, something she later retracted and ended up going back on, as she appeared in fourteenth season of the show, in a guest appearance. Brown's departure marked the third of six housewives to leave the show from the original line-up, leaving Bardsley, Simon and Ward remaining. The first clip for the seventh series was revealed on ITV stating that the show will be back in March, confirming the return of the remaining housewives as well as a guest appearance from Kane. On 28 February 2018, it was revealed that Christine McGuinness, the wife of Paddy McGuinness would be joining the show for the seventh series. Upon the series premiere, it was announced that her appearance would be in a recurring capacity. The seventh series concluded with a reunion show which took place at Manchester Hall, the first to be filmed in a new location in the show's history.

At the end of the seventh seasons' reunion, host Dowling confirmed that the show would return for an eighth series. On 27 July 2018, it was revealed that both Forsey and Pieters-Mekic would not be returning as main housewives for the eighth season but would feature as guests. On 1 August 2018, the cast of the eighth series was revealed, introducing new housewives Hanna Kinsella and Perla Navia.

=== Series 9–12 ===
On 19 March 2019, a ninth series was confirmed to be premiering the following week, with all the housewives returning from the previous series, with the exception of original housewife, Simon, citing her intention to focus on her two girls amid her ongoing divorce, from husband, Paul Simon.

On 2 August 2019, the cast of the tenth series was confirmed, with all housewives returning from the previous series, with the addition of Leilani Dowding while McGuiness and Pieters-Mekic would return as guests. The tenth series also moved from the regular ten o'clock timeslot, to the peak time position of nine o'clock. There was a special episode to mark a milestone one hundredth episode, which included all current housewives as well as features from former housewives Brown, Gorré, Simon, and Forsey. On 13 January 2020, Dowding confirmed she would not be returning to the series after one season on Instagram.

On 26 January 2020, it was announced that Simon would be returning to the series, following a two-season break. On 4 March 2020, it was announced that the eleventh series would premiere in March, with Navia announcing her departure from the series after three seasons. The eleventh series was postponed due to the COVID-19 pandemic but on 7 April 2020, it was announced that the upcoming series would premiere on 20 April 2020 with Nicole Sealey joining the cast but that the series would feature only eight episodes, rather than the traditional eleven. A virtual reunion was held to review the season.

In August 2020, Dohnalová announced her departure from the series after filming the first two episodes of the twelfth season. That same month, longtime friend of the housewives Christine McGuinness also announced that she had quit the series. On 30 September 2020, it was announced that twelfth season would begin airing on the 12 October with new housewife, Lystra Adams, joining the group, during the third episode of the series.

On 11 December 2020, original housewife, Ward, announced her departure from the series and confirming the series will continue with another season. She cited that she wished to spend more time with her family and said that the pandemic had offered her time to reflect on this decision.

=== Series 13–16 ===
Filming for thirteenth season commenced on 1 March 2021. On 28 April 2021, it was announced that all of the wives from the twelfth season, with the exception of Ward, would be returning, alongside new housewife and psychic, Deborah Davies. Dohnalova was announced to make guest appearances during this season. Season 13 premiered on 10 May 2021.

Filming for the fourteenth instalment commenced on 4 August 2021. Two weeks later, it was announced that original cast member, Brown, would be returning as a friend of for the first time since leaving the show following the sixth season. On 27 September 2021, it was confirmed that all the housewives would be returning for the fourteenth season, along with the addition of Sheena Lynch and the series premiered on 11 October 2021. On 11 November 2021, following little appearance on the fourteenth season, Bardsley announced she had quit the show after almost seven years. In January 2022, Davies announced on her Instagram, that she was to leave the show to pursue upcoming projects.

The fifteenth season premiered in August 2022, on a delayed schedule, in comparison to previous years. Katie Alex was introduced as a series regular with Karen Loderick of The Real Housewives of Jersey and Ashley Stobart joining as “friends of the housewives”. Pieters-Mekic and Kane made guest appearances throughout the season. During the reunion special, the sixteenth season was confirmed to have been ordered. Following the reunion, a spin-off special was announced titled Christmas Cruising. Alex was absent from the special, whilst Bardsley and Dohnalová made a guest appearance.

The sixteenth series premiered on 20 March 2023, with Natasha Hamilton joining the cast alongside new friend of the housewives Paige Chohan. Bardsley returned, alongside Chohan in a recurring capacity, whilst Alex made a guest appearance. Later that year the two episode "Pride Special" was filmed, airing in January 2024, it featured guest appearances from Bardsley, Pickston & Dohnalova, after this it was announced that Kinsella and Hamilton had left the show.

=== Series 17–present ===
Filming for Season 17 resumed early 2024 and the series begun airing on the 25th March 2024, it was revealed that Chohan had been promoted to a full time housewife and was joined by Elle Egar, a fashion influencer. The series also featured Bardsley and Pickston in a recurring capacity whilst Kinsella and Kane made guest Appearances.

Filming for the 10 year anniversary commenced in December 2024, with the girls being flown out for a special trip in Thailand.

As of January 2025 only Bardsley and Simon have confirmed so far that their returning for series 18, Filming for the eighteenth edition will also begin in January 2025. On 26 January 2025 Simon posted on Instagram confirming Malhotra, Lugo and Lynch returning as well as OG Leanne Brown is also returning, later on 8 February 2025 Simon posted on Instagram again this time confirming, Adams, and Egar are returning also that Kinsella is also coming back however like Brown unknown what their roles will be.

On 19 February 2025 ITV confirmed the cast of the eighteenth edition with Egar, Simon, Adams, Chohan, Lugo, Malhotra and Lynch being the cast and that Sealey was not returning with the premiere date of 3 March 2025. The series featured returns from many Cheshire alums and all OG's with Dawn Ward, Magali Gorré, Leanne Brown, Ampika Pickston, Tanya Bardsley, Ester Dee, Nermina Piters-Mekic, Hanna Kinsella & Debbie Davis all making guest appearances throughout the season to mark the 10 Year Anniversary.

Filming for Series 19 commenced in mid-January 2026. On the 1st April 2026, the cast was confirmed - Lauren Simon, Seema Malhotra, Rachel Lugo, Sheena Lynch and Paige Chohan would all be returning, along with Ampika Pickston rejoining as a housewife. Lystra Adams and Ellie Egar did not return but will appear as 'guests'. On the 14th April 2026, the premier date was announced as Tuesday 21 April 2026 (the first time in the history of the show the episodes were aired on Tuesdays). In episode 1 of Series 19, it was announced that Seema Malhotra would be moving to Dubai, and therefore Series 19 would be her last on the show.

== Cast ==
=== Timeline of housewives ===
Main cast members
Cast member	Series																		
Cast member	1	2	3	4	5	6	7	8	9	10	11	12	13	14	15	16	17	18	19
Tanya Bardsley	Main	Main	Main	Main	Main	Main	Main	Main	Main	Main	Main	Main	Main	Main	Guest (Note: Appears in The Real Housewives of Cheshire: Christmas Cruising special only.)	Friend	Friend	Guest	Friend
Leanne Brown	Main	Main	Main	Main	Main	Main				Guest				Friend				Friend	Guest
Magali Gorré	Main	Main								Guest								Guest	
Ampika Pickston	Main	Main	Main	Main	Main											Guest	Friend	Guest	Main
Lauren Simon	Main	Main	Main	Main	Main	Main	Main	Main			Main	Main	Main	Main	Main	Main	Main	Main	Main
Dawn Ward	Main	Main	Main	Main	Main	Main	Main	Main	Main	Main	Main	Main						Guest	Guest
Missé Beqiri			Main	Main	Friend														
Stacey Forsey	Guest		Main	Main	Main	Main	Main	Friend											
Seema Malhotra	Guest		Main	Main	Main	Main	Main	Main	Main	Main	Main	Main	Main	Main	Main	Main	Main	Main	Main
Ester Dohnalová				Guest	Main	Main	Main	Main	Main	Main	Main	Main	Friend		Guest	Guest		Guest	Guest
Rachel Lugo						Main	Main	Main	Main	Main	Main	Main	Main	Main	Main	Main	Main	Main	Main
Nermina Pieters-Mekic			Guest			Main	Main	Friend	Guest	Guest				Guest	Guest			Friend	Friend
Hanna Kinsella							Guest	Main	Main	Main	Main	Main	Main	Main	Main	Main	Guest	Guest	
Perla Navia								Main	Main	Main									
Leilani Dowding										Main									
Nicole Sealey											Main	Main	Main	Main	Main	Main	Main	Guest	
Lystra Adams						Guest	Guest			Guest		Main	Main	Main	Main	Main	Main	Main	Guest
Deborah Davies													Main	Main				Guest	
Sheena Lynch														Main	Main	Main	Main	Main	Main
Katie Alex															Main	Guest			
Natasha Hamilton																Main			
Paige Chohan															Guest	Friend	Main	Main	Main
Ellie Egar																	Main	Main	Guest
Friends of the housewives
Chantelle Heskey		Friend	Guest	Guest															
Katie Kane						Friend	Guest	Guest	Guest	Guest		Guest			Guest		Guest	Guest	Guest
Christine McGuinness							Friend	Friend	Guest	Guest	Friend								
Karen Loderick															Friend				
Ashley Stobart															Friend				

== Episodes ==
Series	Episodes		Originally released	
Series	Episodes		First released	Last released
1	10		12 January 2015	16 March 2015
2	10		7 September 2015	9 November 2015
3	11		4 April 2016	13 June 2016
4	11		5 September 2016	8 November 2016
5	11		27 March 2017	30 May 2017
6	11		11 September 2017	14 November 2017
7	11		26 March 2018	29 May 2018
8	11		10 September 2018	13 November 2018
9	11		25 March 2019	28 May 2019
10	11		9 September 2019	12 November 2019
11	8		20 April 2020	8 June 2020
12	11		12 October 2020	21 December 2020
13	10		10 May 2021	12 July 2021
14	14	12	11 October 2021	21 December 2021
14	14	2 (Note: Real Housewives and the Menopause)	8 August 2022	9 August 2022
15	14	11	22 August 2022	31 October 2022
15	14	3 (Note: The Real Housewives of Cheshire: Christmas Cruising)	5 December 2022	19 December 2022
16	13	11	20 March 2023	29 May 2023
16	13	2 (Note: The Real Housewives of Cheshire: Pride)	8 January 2024	9 January 2024
17	13		25 March 2024	17 June 2024
18	13		3 March 2025	26 May 2025
19	6		21 April 2026	26 May 2026

== International broadcast ==
In Australia, the series premiered on Arena on 24 May 2015. In the United States, the series debuted on 14 November 2015, on Bravo, the same network that initiated The Real Housewives franchise. In Spain the series airs on Ten.
