= Lauren Simon =

English television personality (born 1972)

- Born: Lauren Belinda Goldstone; 22 March 1972 (age 54); Manchester, England
- Occupation: Television personality
- Years active: 2015–present
- Television: The Real Housewives of Cheshire; Celebrity Big Brother
- Spouse: Paul Simon (m. 2003; div. 2018)
- Children: 2

Lauren Belinda Simon (née Goldstone; born 22 March 1972) is an English television personality, known for appearing as a cast member on the ITVBe reality television series The Real Housewives of Cheshire. In 2024, she appeared as a housemate on the twenty-third series of Celebrity Big Brother.

== Early life ==
Simon was born Lauren Belinda Goldstone on 22 March 1972 in Manchester, England. Prior to appearing on television, she worked in public relations, as well as marketing for nightclubs and VIP events.

== Media career ==
In September 2014, Simon was announced as one of the original cast members of the ITVBe reality series The Real Housewives of Cheshire, based on the global The Real Housewives franchise. The show began airing in January 2015. In 2018, Simon separated from her husband after 15 years of marriage and subsequently did not appear in the ninth or tenth series of the show. In 2020, she returned for the eleventh series and has appeared regularly ever since.

Simon has made various guest appearances on several television shows including Release the Hounds, CelebAbility and Your Face or Mine?. In February 2022, she appeared on an episode of Celebrity Dinner Date. In April 2022, Simon joined Happy Radio, a local station for Cheshire and South Manchester, as one of the presenters. She presented a weekday show from 3–4pm titled Lauren's Happy Hour. In January 2024, Simon appeared in an episode of the Channel 4 series First Dates.

In March 2024, Simon appeared as a housemate on the twenty-third series of Celebrity Big Brother. She was the second housemate to be evicted on Day 9.

== Personal life ==
She married property developer Paul Simon in 2003, and they have two daughters together. In 2018, she separated from her husband after 15 years of marriage.

== Filmography ==
As herself
Year	Title	Role	Ref.
2015–2018, 2020–present	The Real Housewives of Cheshire	Cast member	
2015	This Morning	Guest	
2015	Lorraine	Guest; 2 episodes	
2018	Release the Hounds	Guest	
2018	CelebAbility	Guest	
2018	Your Face or Mine?	Guest	
2022	Celebrity Dinner Date	Guest	
2024	First Dates	Guest	
2024	Celebrity Big Brother	Housemate; series 23	
