= Dawn Ward (TV personality) =

English television personality (born 1973)

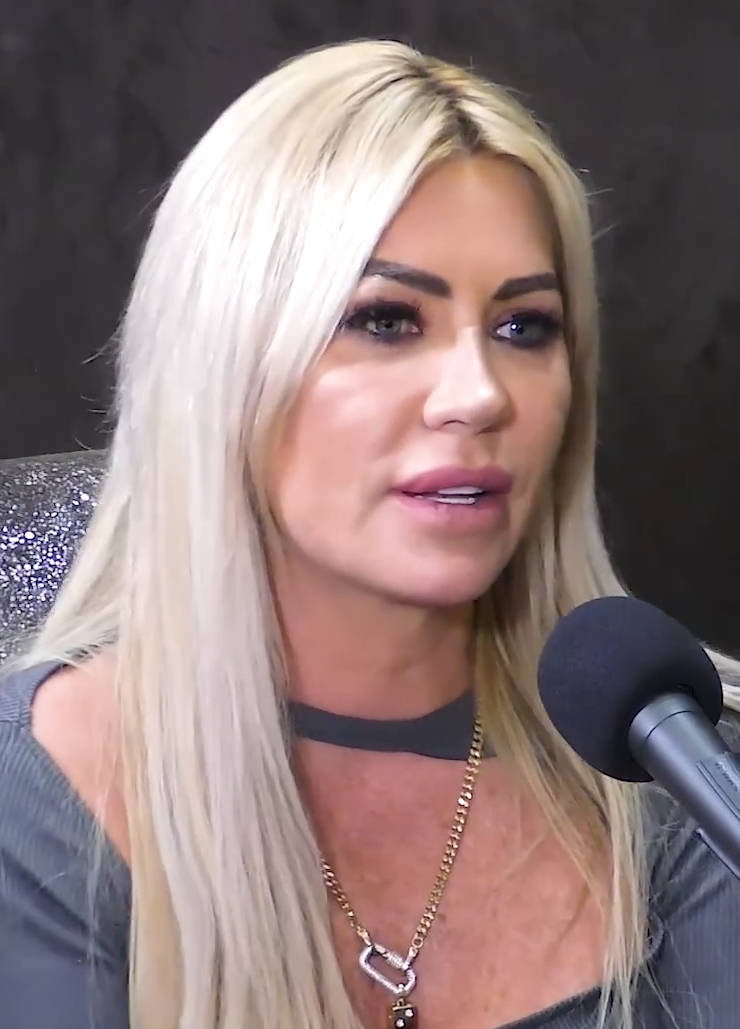
- Ward in 2023
- Born: Dawn Louise Burke; 16 July 1973 (age 53); Salford, Manchester, England
- Occupation: Television personality
- Years active: 2015–present
- Television: The Real Housewives of Cheshire
- Spouse: Ashley Ward (m. 1995)
- Children: 4

Dawn Louise Ward (née Burke; born 16 July 1973) is an English interior designer and television personality, known for appearing as a cast member on the ITVBe reality television series The Real Housewives of Cheshire between 2015 and 2020.

== Early life ==
Ward was born Dawn Louise Burke on 16 July 1973 in Salford, Manchester. Her father came from a large Irish family of twenty siblings in Kilkenny. Her family moved to Hunger Hill, an area of Bolton, where she attended Deane High School. She left school at the age of 16 with no qualifications. Ward went on to run a care home in the Bolton area.

== Career ==
In September 2014, Ward was announced as one of the original cast members of the ITVBe reality series The Real Housewives of Cheshire, based on the global The Real Housewives franchise. The show began airing in January 2015. Ward appeared in twelve series of the show, regularly appearing alongside her husband and daughters. In December 2020, Ward announced her departure from the show after five years. In a statement explaining her decision Ward said, "Having been on [The Real Housewives of Cheshire] for twelve series, she was leaving the show in order to spend more time with her family adding that it had been "the most incredible journey, not just for [her], but for [her] whole family [...] and that it had "really has been amazing for [them]."

Ward has made various guest appearances on several television shows including Loose Women, This Morning, Gemma Collins: Diva Forever and Hey Tracey!. In January 2020, she appeared on an episode of Celebrity Come Dine with Me alongside Charlotte Crosby, Ewen MacIntosh and Jay Hutton.

== Personal life ==
Ward married professional footballer Ashley Ward on 2 June 1995, and they have four daughters together. Ward and her husband run several businesses together, including a commercial property business, operating Abafields, a nursing home in Bolton bought for development but now operating under a manager. They also manage a £15million luxury property development company Bilton Ward Developments. The family have since relocated to Dubai.

In June 2016, Ward was found guilty of assaulting singer Sinitta after punching her at a restaurant the previous year. In March 2022, Ward was cleared after appearing in court facing two counts of racially aggravated harassment against two Jewish men and one count of cocaine possession.

== Filmography ==
As herself
| Year | Title | Role | Ref. |
|---|---|---|---|
| 2015–2020; 2025 | The Real Housewives of Cheshire | Cast member | |
| 2017 | Loose Women | Guest; 1 episode | |
| 2018–2020 | This Morning | Guest; 5 episodes | |
| 2019 | Gemma Collins: Diva Forever | Guest; 1 episode | |
| 2020 | Celebrity Come Dine with Me | Guest; 1 episode | |
| 2020 | Hey Tracey! | Guest; 1 episode | |
| 2024 | The Real Housewives of Dubai | Guest; 2 episodes | |
