= Tanya Bardsley =

British television personality (born 1981)

- Born: Tanya Louise Robinson; 29 April 1981 (age 45); Higher End, Wigan, England
- Occupations: Model; reality television personality
- Spouse: Phil Bardsley
- Children: 4
- Modelling information
- Height: 5 ft 3 in (1.60 m)
- Hair colour: Brown
- Eye colour: Brown
- Agency: United Agents

Tanya Louise Bardsley (née Robinson; born 29 April 1981) is an English model and reality television personality. She is best known for starring in the ITVBe reality television series The Real Housewives of Cheshire since 2015, of which she is the longest serving cast member. She is married to Macclesfield Town F.C. assistant manager Phil Bardsley.

== Early life ==
Robinson was born in Wigan, Greater Manchester, and grew up in Richmond, North Yorkshire. Her father, Steve, worked for the British Army throughout Robinson's childhood.

== Modelling career ==
Robinson has appeared on the cover of Zoo Weekly, Ice, and several times in FHM magazine, as being the winner of their inaugural "High Street Honeys" competition in 2002, and being named to their "100 Sexiest Women in the World" list in 2003 (38), 2004 (32), 2005 (41), 2006 (29) and 2007 (63).

In 2003, Robinson appeared in a Lynx advert where she appeared as a pizza delivery girl in pink underwear.

Robinson had breast enlargement surgery going from a B cup to a 32D. In 2007, she appeared topless for the first time since getting her breasts enlarged in Zoo, having previously only been photographed topless on holiday before her breast enlargement. Robinson subsequently posed topless in shoots for FHM and Zoo, including a shoot for Zoo with fellow High Street Honey Kayleigh Pearson.

== The Real Housewives of Cheshire ==
In January 2015, the British reality TV series The Real Housewives of Cheshire debuted with Tanya Bardsley as one of the original cast members, along with Leanne Brown, Magali Gorré, Ampika Pickston, Lauren Simon and Dawn Ward. A British adaptation of the long-running American series The Real Housewives of Orange County, the series follows the lives of a selection of wealthy women in Cheshire. Bardsley left the show at the end of 2021 after almost seven years as a main cast member, however has continued to make semi-regular and guest appearances.

== Wellness Hub ==
In February 2020, Bardsley created the wellness hub at shop Tanya Bardo Boutique in Wilmslow, Cheshire with John Junior who is a British mental health activist from Wilmslow.

== Personal life ==
Bardsley is married to footballer Phil Bardsley and has four children: Rocco, Renz, Ralphi and Gabriella.

Bardsley has spoken about being diagnosed with dyslexia as an adult. In May 2021, Bardsley revealed that she had been diagnosed with ADHD after years of being treated for anxiety.

Bardsley, on 24 March 2022 closed her shop (Tanya Bardo Boutique) in Wilmslow, after it had been running for 5 years.
