= Ampika Pickston =

British reality TV star (born 1981)

- Born: Ampika Fawcett; 23 July 1981 (age 45); Oldham, England
- Occupations: Television personality; businesswoman
- Spouse: Mark Pickston
- Partner: David Sullivan
- Children: 1

Ampika Pickston (born 23 July 1981) is an English model, reality TV star and business owner. She starred in The Real Housewives of Cheshire from 2015 to 2017. Pickston is the CEO of Ampika's Aesthetics, a training school based in Hale, Greater Manchester, which teaches aesthetic procedures.

== Early life ==
Pickston was born on 23 July 1981 in Oldham, Lancashire, and grew up in Shaw, Lancashire, where she was raised by her grandfather, William Fawcett. Her father, Paul Fawcett, worked for British Telecom during her early years. Pickston attended Rishworth School. Her mother, whose surname is Yachan, is Thai.

== The Real Housewives of Cheshire ==
In January 2015, the British reality TV series The Real Housewives of Cheshire debuted with Pickston, Leanne Brown, Magali Gorré, Tanya Bardsley, Lauren Simon and Dawn Ward. A British adaptation of the long-running American franchise The Real Housewives, the series follows the lives of a group of wealthy women in Cheshire. Pickston left the show at the end of fifth series, in 2017, after appearing in 55 episodes and three reunions. Pickston returned to the show in a guest capacity in the sixteenth series (2023) and featured in a recurring capacity for the seventeenth series (2024). The eighteenth series (2025) celebrated ten years of the show, which Pickston appeared in. Pickston returned to the show in a full-time role from the nineteenth series, in 2026.

Pickston won the Best Female Personality Award at the Sixth Annual National Reality TV Awards.

== Other television appearances ==
Pickston has appeared on Celebrity Ghost Hunt Live, broadcast on Channel 5 in 2017 alongside Love Island contestant Chris Hughes. She also took part in a cooking mini series for ITVBe, and an episode of Rich House Poor House for Channel 5.

== Modelling ==
In 2020, Pickston joined OnlyFans as a content creator.

== Business career ==
=== Ampika's Aesthetics ===
Pickston is the founder and CEO of Ampika's Aesthetics, a cosmetic training business with schools in Hale, Edinburgh, Bristol, Newcastle and London's Harley Street. It was founded in 2019. The training academy offers aesthetic and cosmetic training for beginners and medical professionals to gain experience and CPD accreditation. It is regulated by OFQUAL through Qualifi.

=== AP Care Homes ===
Pickston is the Director of AP Care Homes, a company based in the North West of England which provided residential care for children. The home catered for the needs of children aged 12-16 with emotional and behavioural difficulties. It was a long term solution for vulnerable children. It employed a registered manager, deputy manager and seven full time key workers. Following an inspection on 16 and 17 November 2023, Ofsted concluded AP Care Homes Limited had "serious and/or widespread failures that mean children and young people are not protected or their welfare is not promoted or safeguarded and the care and experiences of children and young people are poor and they are not making progress". Ofsted inspectors said that Pickston had overseen the management of the home but "did not have the skills and experience" to run it in line with children's home regulations. It was also found that Pickston took one child to her home and, after an internal investigation found that “professional boundaries had been blurred”, she allegedly offered to do it again three weeks later. The home closed in December 2023 after Ofsted issued a notice suspending the registration of the home.

=== Skinny Revolution ===
Pickston founded Skinny Revolution to help people to lose weight after she gained 7 stone in 14 months, partly whilst pregnant, using a Wegovy (semaglutide) injection, which is a 2.4 mg injectable prescription medicine used as an appetite suppressant.

== Personal life ==
Pickston is engaged to former West Ham United co-chairman David Sullivan. She has a son, Jake, with her former husband Mark Pickston.

She lives in Hale Barns, in the house which was filmed for the Real Housewives of Cheshire episodes that she appeared in.
