= Celebrity Big Brother (British TV series) series 24 =

Celebrity Big Brother
- Series 24
- Series twenty-four logo
- Hosted by: AJ Odudu; Will Best
- No. of days: 19
- No. of housemates: 13
- Winner: Jack P. Shepherd
- Runner-up: Danny Beard
- Companion show: Celebrity Big Brother: Late & Live
- No. of episodes: 17

Release
- Original network: ITV1
- Original release: 7 April – 25 April 2025

Series chronology
- ← Previous; Series 23

Celebrity Big Brother 2025, also known as Celebrity Big Brother 24, is the twenty-fourth series of Celebrity Big Brother. It is the second celebrity series and fourth series of Big Brother overall to air on ITV since ITV plc. gained the rights to the format. The series began on 7 April 2025 on ITV1 and was co-presented by AJ Odudu and Will Best, who also returned to host the companion show, Celebrity Big Brother: Late & Live on ITV2.

The series concluded on 25 April 2025, with Coronation Street actor Jack P. Shepherd being announced as the winner, with drag queen Danny Beard finishing as the runner-up.

== Format ==
Celebrity Big Brother is a game show in which a group of celebrity contestants, referred to as housemates, live in isolation from the outside world in a custom built "house", constantly under video surveillance. During their time in the House, the housemates are required to nominate two of their fellow contestants for potential eviction, and the two or more with the most votes would be nominated. This process is mandatory for all housemates, and failure to comply could result in expulsion from the House. The public then vote, with one of those celebrities evicted from the house. When the final week arrives, the viewers vote for which of the remaining celebrities should win the series, and the housemate with the most votes becomes the winner.

During their time in the House, housemates are given weekly tasks to perform. The housemates wager a portion of their weekly shopping budget on the task, and either win double their wagered fund or lose the wagered fund depending on their performance in the task. The housemates are required to work as a group to complete their tasks, with the format of the tasks varying based on the number of remaining housemates. Throughout the series, some housemates have been given secret tasks that must either be completed individually or with a small group; failure to do so can result in the housemate being nominated or punished in the House. Should the housemates run out of the food provided for them, an emergency ration was available to them. The housemates are forbidden from discussing nominations, and doing so could result in punishment. The format of the series is mainly seen as a social experiment, and requires housemates to interact with others who may have differing ideals, beliefs, and prejudices. Housemates are also required to make visits to the Diary Room during their stay in the House, where they are able to share their thoughts and feelings on their fellow housemates and the game.

== Housemates ==
On Day 1, thirteen housemates entered the house during the launch show.

Celebrity	Age on entry	Notability	Day entered	Day exited	Result	Ref.
Jack P. Shepherd	37	Coronation Street actor	1	19	Winner	
Danny Beard	32	Drag queen & television personality	1	19	Runner-up	
JoJo Siwa	21	Singer, dancer & actress	1	19	3rd place	
Donna Preston	38	Actress & comedian	1	19	4th place	
Chesney Hawkes	53	Singer & actor	1	19	5th place	
Chris Hughes	32	Television personality & sports presenter	1	19	6th place	
Patsy Palmer	52	Former EastEnders actress & DJ	1	16	Evicted	
Ella Rae Wise	24	The Only Way Is Essex cast member	1	16	Evicted	
Angellica Bell	49	Television & radio presenter	1	16	Evicted	
Daley Thompson	66	Former Olympic decathlete	1	12	Evicted	
Trisha Goddard	67	Television presenter	1	9	Evicted	
Mickey Rourke	72	Actor & former professional boxer	1	6	Ejected	
Michael Fabricant	74	Former Conservative Party politician	1	5	Evicted	

=== Angellica Bell ===
Angellica Bell is an English television and radio presenter. She began her career presenting on CBBC between 2000 and 2006, and fronted several programmes for the broadcaster including That's Genius!, Xchange, 50/50, Short Change and The Saturday Show. She subsequently went on to co-present The Martin Lewis Money Show between 2017 and 2023 and has served as a guest presenter on The One Show. She has also presented on the radio stations Magic, Hits Radio and BBC Radio 2, as well as winning the twelfth series of Celebrity MasterChef in 2017. She entered the house on Day 1 and became the fourth housemate to be evicted on Day 16, in a triple eviction.

=== Chesney Hawkes ===
Chesney Hawkes is an English singer and actor. He began his career in 1991, when he starred in the comedy-drama film Buddy's Song. The film featured his best-known single "The One and Only", which topped the UK Singles Chart for five weeks and reached the top 10 in the United States. His follow up singles included "I'm a Man Not a Boy", "What's Wrong with This Picture?" and "Secrets of the Heart". Outside of music, Hawkes appeared as a contestant on Channel 4's The Games in 2005 and Celebrity Coach Trip in 2022. His other television appearances include Hit Me Baby One More Time, Let's Dance for Comic Relief and Sing If You Can. In 2009, Hawkes made a cameo on Celebrity Big Brother 6, appearing on a cherry picker during a paparazzi task. Housemates Mutya and Terry also worshipped a shrine dedicated to him as part of a celebrity cult challenge. He returned to the show in 2025 as a full housemate, entering on Day 1 and finishing in fifth place on Day 19.

=== Chris Hughes ===
Chris Hughes is an English television personality, model and sports presenter. In 2017, he appeared on the third series of the ITV2 reality series Love Island, finishing in third place alongside Olivia Attwood. The pair appeared in their own reality series Chris & Olivia: Crackin' On, and he embarked on a music career alongside his Love Island co-star Kem Cetinay in the duo Chris & Kem. They released the song "Little Bit Leave It" which peaked at number 15 on the UK Singles Chart. Since then, he has worked as a sports presenter for ITV Racing and provided commentary for the BBC Sport coverage of The Hundred. He entered the house on Day 1 and finished in sixth place on Day 19.

=== Daley Thompson ===
Daley Thompson is an English former decathlete. He won the decathlon gold medal at the Olympic Games in 1980 and 1984, and broke the world record for the event four times. He was unbeaten in competition for nine years. With four world records, two Olympic gold medals, three Commonwealth titles and wins in the World and European Championships, Thompson is considered by many to be one of the greatest decathletes of all time. He won the BBC Sports Personality of the Year award in 1982, was appointed an MBE in the 1983 New Year Honours His autobiography, Daley: Olympic Superstar, was published in 2024. He entered the house on Day 1 and became the third housemate to be evicted on Day 12.

=== Danny Beard ===
Danny Beard is an English drag queen, television personality and singer. In 2016, they appeared on the tenth series of Britain's Got Talent and reached the semi-finals. They subsequently appeared on Karaoke Club: Drag Edition in 2021 and reached the finals, before going on to win the fourth series of RuPaul's Drag Race UK in 2022. They have since presented a spin-off of the latter, The After Shave with Danny Beard, had a cameo role in the Channel 4 soap opera Hollyoaks and appeared as a panellist on Big Brother: Late & Live, as well as presenting on the radio station Gaydio and fronting a podcast titled The Gossip Gays. They entered the house on Day 1 and finished as the runner-up on Day 19.

=== Donna Preston ===
Donna Preston is an English actress, comedian and writer. She began her career with various minor roles in television and film, before going on to appear in the ITV2 series Apocalypse Wow and Hey Tracey!, as well as fronting the E4 series Pants on Fire and appearing in various skits on Michael McIntyre's Big Show. In 2022, she appeared as Despair in the Netflix series The Sandman and was runner-up on the reality competition Celebrity Karaoke Club. She has also appeared in Coronation Street, Hard Cell and Pickle Storm and took part in the Channel 4 reality series Scared of the Dark in 2023. She entered the house on Day 1 and finished in fourth place on Day 19.

=== Ella Rae Wise ===
Ella Rae Wise is an English television personality, known for appearing as a cast member on the ITVBe reality series The Only Way Is Essex since 2019. During her tenure, the show has documented her relationships with her co-stars including Pete Wicks and Dan Edgar respectively. She also appeared on the second series of Celebrity Ex on the Beach in 2022. In 2023, she was a contestant on The Challenge UK and was eliminated in episode 4. She entered the house on Day 1 and became the fifth housemate to be evicted on Day 16, in a triple eviction.

=== Jack P. Shepherd ===
Jack P. Shepherd is an English actor, who is best known for portraying the role of David Platt on the ITV soap opera Coronation Street since 2000. For his portrayal of the character, he has won various awards, including the British Soap Award for Villain of the Year in 2008 and Best Actor in 2018. He has also served as a team captain on The Big Quiz and co-hosts a podcast, On The Sofa with his Coronation Street co-stars Ben Price and Colson Smith. He entered the house on Day 1 and was announced as the winner on Day 19.

=== JoJo Siwa ===
JoJo Siwa is an American singer, dancer, actress, and media personality. She came to prominence whilst appearing on the reality television show Dance Moms between 2015 and 2016, before being signed to Nickelodeon, where she appeared in various television shows and films. Siwa released her debut single "Boomerang" in 2016 and went on to release several other songs, as well as appearing as a contestant on the third season of The Masked Singer and the thirtieth season of Dancing with the Stars in the U.S. In 2024, she released an extended play Guilty Pleasure, which featured the single "Karma". She entered the house on Day 1 and finished in third place on Day 19.

=== Michael Fabricant ===
Sir Michael Fabricant is an English politician. A member of the Conservative Party, he served as the Member of Parliament (MP) for Lichfield in Staffordshire, formerly Mid Staffordshire, from 1992 until his defeat in 2024. Fabricant was also the vice-chairman of the Conservative Party for parliamentary campaigning, until his dismissal from this position in April 2014, over comments he had made about his colleague Maria Miller's resignation. He appeared on Celebrity First Dates in 2017, during which he came out as bisexual. He entered the house on Day 1 and became the first housemate to be evicted on Day 5.

=== Mickey Rourke ===
Mickey Rourke is an American actor and former professional boxer, who has appeared primarily as a leading man in drama, action, and thriller films. His early roles included Rumble Fish (1983), The Pope of Greenwich Village (1984), Year of the Dragon (1985), 9½ Weeks (1986), Angel Heart (1987), Francesco (1989), and Johnny Handsome (1989). After training as a boxer, Rourke turned professional and was undefeated in eight fights, until retiring in 1994. He subsequently returned to acting and had supporting roles in numerous films over the next decade, before portraying lead roles in Sin City (2005) and The Wrestler (2008), the latter of which won him the Golden Globe Award and BAFTA Award for Best Actor. He entered the house on Day 1. He was given a formal warning for use of homophobic language on Day 2, and was subsequently removed from the house on Day 6, following further use of inappropriate language and unacceptable behaviour.

=== Patsy Palmer ===
Patsy Palmer is an English actress. After appearing as Natasha in the BBC children's drama Grange Hill between 1985 and 1987, she became best known for her portrayal of Bianca Jackson in the BBC soap opera EastEnders. She initially played the role between 1993 and 1999, and again from 2008 to 2014, prior to a guest return in 2019 and a further stint between 2024 and 2025. For her portrayal of the character, she won the award for Best Actress at the British Soap Awards in 2000. She also appeared as a contestant on the third series of Strictly Come Dancing in 2005, the first series of The Masked Singer in 2020, and the fifteenth series of Dancing on Ice in 2023. She entered the house on Day 1 and became the sixth housemate to be evicted on Day 16, in a triple eviction.

=== Trisha Goddard ===
Trisha Goddard is an English television presenter, best known for fronting her television talk show Trisha between 1998 and 2010. She also hosted the Australian children's show Play School from 1987 to 1998. Goddard has been based in the U.S. since 2010, when she started working on Maury as a conflict resolution expert and subsequently hosted a U.S. version of her talk show titled The Trisha Goddard Show between 2012 and 2014. She was a contestant on the twelfth series of Dancing on Ice in 2020. Since 2021, Goddard has presented on talkRADIO, as well as the television equivalent TalkTV which launched the following year. She also fronted a revival series of You Are What You Eat. She entered the house on Day 1 and became the second housemate to be evicted on Day 9.

== Nominations table ==
	Day 3	Day 7	Day 10	Day 14	Day 19 Final		Nominations received
Jack	Danny, Donna	Angellica, Ella	Ella, Angellica	Ella, Angellica	Winner (Day 19)		16
Danny	Jack, Chesney	Patsy, Jack	Jack, Patsy	Chris, JoJo	Runner-up (Day 19)		5
JoJo	Mickey, Michael, Jack	Patsy, Ella	Patsy, Danny	Patsy, Ella	Third place (Day 19)		5
Donna	Jack, Angellica	Chris, Jack	Daley, Jack	Angellica, JoJo	Fourth place (Day 19)		2
Chesney	Jack, Donna	Trisha, Patsy	Chris, JoJo	Ella, Patsy	Fifth place (Day 19)		3
Chris	Michael, Angellica	Patsy, Trisha	Patsy, Daley	Ella, Danny	Sixth place (Day 19)		7
Patsy	Jack, Michael	Danny, Trisha	Daley, Angellica	Angellica, Ella	Evicted (Day 16)		16
Ella	Jack, Chesney	Chris, Trisha	Patsy, Jack	Chesney, Chris	Evicted (Day 16)		9
Angellica	Michael, Jack	Jack, Patsy	Patsy, Daley	Patsy, Jack	Evicted (Day 16)		8
Daley	Michael, JoJo	Danny, Chris	JoJo, Chris	Evicted (Day 12)			4
Trisha	Michael, Jack	Patsy, Jack	Evicted (Day 9)				4
Mickey	Patsy, Michael	Ejected (Day 6)					1
Michael	Patsy, Ella	Evicted (Day 5)					7
Notes	1	none		2, 3	4		
Against public vote	Jack, Michael, Mickey	Jack, Patsy, Trisha	Daley, Patsy	Angellica, Chris, Danny, Ella, ~~JoJo,~~; Patsy	Chesney, Chris, Danny, Donna, Jack, JoJo		
Ejected	none	Mickey	none				
Evicted	Michael; Fewest votes to save	Trisha; Fewest votes to save	Daley; Fewest votes to save	Angellica; Fewest votes to save	Chris; 2.52% (out of 6)	JoJo; 13.17% (out of 3)	
Evicted	Michael; Fewest votes to save	Trisha; Fewest votes to save	Daley; Fewest votes to save	Angellica; Fewest votes to save	Chesney; 3.04% (out of 5)	Danny; 35.72% (out of 2)	
Evicted	Michael; Fewest votes to save	Trisha; Fewest votes to save	Daley; Fewest votes to save	Ella; Fewest votes to save	Donna; 8.18% (out of 4)	Danny; 35.72% (out of 2)	
Evicted	Michael; Fewest votes to save	Trisha; Fewest votes to save	Daley; Fewest votes to save	Patsy; Fewest votes to save	Jack; 37.37% to win		

Notes

- ^Note 1: On Day 1, Mickey entered "Big Brother's Top Secret Power Prize Room" where he was given the option the choose between three powers; "Immunity", "Guardian Angel" and "Killer Nomination". He chose "Guardian Angel", allowing him to give immunity to a fellow housemate: he chose Daley. After being selected by Mickey to enter next, JoJo opted for the "Killer Nomination" power, allowing her to automatically nominate a fellow housemate for eviction: she chose Mickey. Chris was selected by JoJo to enter the room last, ultimately leaving him with the final power of Immunity, granting him safety from the first eviction.
- ^Note 2: Housemates nominated face-to-face.
- ^Note 3: On Day 14, the nominated housemates were given the opportunity to save themselves from eviction by finding the "golden egg", and in doing so had to choose another housemate to replace them and face the public vote. JoJo found the "golden egg" and chose Danny to face eviction in her place.
- ^Note 4: The public were voting for who they wanted to win, not who to save. The percentages account for the proportion of all votes the finalists received when the lines closed for good, and do not reflect the voting freezes that occurred during the final. Jack won with 51.13% of the vote between him and Danny.

== Summary ==
The main events in the Celebrity Big Brother 24 house are summarised in the table below.

Day 1	Entrances	Chesney, JoJo, Trisha, Chris, Patsy, Michael, Jack, Ella, Daley, Donna, Angellica, Danny and Mickey entered the house.
Day 1	Twists	Housemates took part in "Big Brother's Super Secret Very Hush Hush Gameshow", where they were set various tasks upon their entrance, and subsequently accumulated points for each task completed. Chesney was told he had to introduce himself as "The One and Only Chesney Hawkes" to the next four housemates to enter. He was successful and won 400 points. Michael had to give the next three housemates to enter as many "high fives" as possible whilst saying "Groovy, baby!". He handed out 10 high fives and therefore added 1000 points to the total. For the final challenge, housemates had to convince the final housemate Mickey to join their conga line. They were successful in doing so, and as he joined the conga line for 10 seconds, housemates earned a further 1000 points, therefore bringing the total score to 2400 points. Big Brother subsequently revealed that the points were for housemates to spend in the "Big Brother's Big Prize Room", which contained luxuries and advantages for housemates. One housemate was able to enter the prize room, which was ultimately Mickey. Upon his entrance, he was able to choose to spend the points on various prizes; opting to buy a blender for 250 points, which he gave to Daley, and a takeaway voucher for 500 points, which he gave to Chris. He was then given access to "Big Brother's Top Secret Power Prize Room" where he was able to choose from three powers, "Immunity", which grants a housemate immunity from eviction, "Guardian Angel" which allows a housemate to save another housemate from eviction, or "Killer Nomination", in which a housemate has to choose another housemate to face eviction. He chose the "Guardian Angel" power. Mickey then had to choose another housemate to enter the prize room; He chose JoJo, who opted to spend the points on a "personalised butler service" for Trisha for 400 points, novelty slippers for Mickey for 100 points, unlimited "Pick 'n' Mix" for Ella for 300 points, and a teddy bear for herself for 50 points, before choosing the "Killer Nomination" power. She then chose Chris as the final housemate to enter, who spent the remainder of the points on a VIP Beautician Treatment for Danny for 500 points and a "guided meditation session" for Patsy for 300 points, before automatically receiving the "Immunity" power as the only prize remaining.
Day 2	Punishments	Mickey was given a formal warning for using homophobic language in conversation with, and towards JoJo.
Day 2	Nominations	Mickey decided to use his "Guardian Angel" power on Daley, therefore making him immune from nominations, whilst JoJo used her "Killer Nomination" on Mickey, meaning he automatically faced the public vote.
Day 3	Nominations	Housemates nominated for the first time. As they were immune, Chris and Daley were not eligible to be nominated. Jack and Michael received the most nominations and therefore faced the public vote alongside Mickey, who received the "Killer Nomination" from JoJo.
Day 4	Tasks	For this task, the house had a "power outage" in which all electrical appliances were switched off. In order to recharge the back-up battery and ultimately restore power to the house, housemates had to showcase their "celebrity star power" by delivering performances on the "star power stage" at various points throughout the day. Chesney had to perform his song "The One and Only" on repeat in order for the hot water to be switched back on, whilst Michael had to deliver a "powerful speech" in order for the electrical appliances to be turned on, and the fridge to become available. Meanwhile, Donna, Jack, Patsy and Mickey had to do some acting improvisation to recharge the battery, before JoJo had to perform a dance routine continuously; and after doing so, earned a party for the house.
Day 5	Exits	Michael became the first housemate to be evicted, after receiving the fewest votes to save.
Day 6	Tasks	For the first shopping task, the house was transformed into a pirate ship. JoJo was appointed captain of the ship, with Angellica and Donna serving as the first mates. The remaining housemates were the ship's crew and had to wait on the captain and first mates, answering the "shell phone" and serving them food and drink upon request. Throughout the task, housemates had to accumulate as many gold coins as possible and guard their vessel from enemy ships by keeping lookout, avoiding failures in order to pass the task and receive a luxury shopping budget. Patsy and Danny were appointed as the chefs, whilst Chris and Jack were given task of lookout on the Crow's Nest. For the next part of the task, Danny and Trisha visited Smuggler's Cove, in a task where they were they faced with treasure chests that each bared different traits relating to their fellow housemates; "Bad Habits", "Noise", "Manners", "Differences" and "Behaviour" respectively. In order for a chest to open, they had to give honest truths and choose which housemate best matched the word written on the chest, and explain their reasons why. They successfully opened all 5 chests and accumulated 900 gold coins. The housemates then had to work together to scare off a sea monster; whilst the crew mates were later faced with a temptation by Lauren Simon who was dressed as a mermaid; and offered the housemates a treat, however in order to accept it, a curse would be placed on the captain and first mates; resulting in them having to "sleep with the fishes". The crew mates accepted the temptation. At the end of the task, housemates incurred several fails; including the crow's nest being left unattended, housemates not wearing their pirate uniforms, crew putting the phone down on the captain and first mates as well as them accepting the temptation. Housemates therefore failed the shopping task and received an economy shopping budget.
Day 6	Exits	Mickey was removed from the house, after using inappropriate sexual language towards Ella, as well as a further altercation with Chris in which he displayed aggressive behaviour.
Day 7	Nominations	Housemates nominated for the second time. Jack, Patsy and Trisha received the most nominations and therefore faced the public vote.
Day 7	Punishments	As a result of Chris discussing nominations with Donna, he was placed in the "Celebrity Wheelie Bin of Shame" and had to write an apology rap for his fellow housemates.
Day 8	Tasks	Housemates took part in the "Big Fame Board Game" in which they were separated into teams; The Red Team made up of Angellica, Chesney and Jack; The Purple Team consisting of JoJo, Patsy and Trisha; The Green Team which featured Daley, Donna and Ella; and the Blue Team which was composed of Chris and Danny. For the task, one member of the team had to roll the dice, whilst another team member acting as the "human playing piece" would have to move the number of squares thrown on the dice. After landing on certain squares, housemates had to complete challenges to advance further along the board. These included JoJo landing on "Terrifying Tax Bill!" and having to create a jingle to promote a toilet for a company brand deal in order to move forward five spaces, Daley landing on "It's Awards Night" and having to allocate awards to the "Biggest Diva", "Biggest Name Dropper" and "Biggest Flirt", which he awarded to Danny, Angellica and Trisha respectively in order to move three spaces. Donna landed on "Hot Take!" in which she had to eat an chilli and give her "spicy opinion" on who she thought would be evicted next to advance three spaces, whilst Jack landed on "Celebrity Spat!" in which he had to select another player to take on in a "celebrity roasting". He chose Patsy, who ultimately won the roast and advanced three spaces. Trisha landed on "Talk Show Tales!" and was tasked to tell the funniest tale of her career, however she failed to impress Big Brother and therefore did not advance five spaces. Chesney landed on "Silence the Stories! and in order to move forward five spaces, had to "tell an even better story" than one a journalist was "threatening to release". He succeeded and therefore The Red Team were the first to finish and won a "VIP Party" for that evening.
Day 8	Punishments	As punishment for Chris and JoJo communicating in code, they could only speak through a megaphone until further notice.
Day 9	Exits	Trisha became the second housemate to be evicted, after receiving the fewest votes to save.
Day 10	Nominations	Housemates nominated for the second time. Daley and Patsy received the most nominations and therefore faced the public vote.
Day 11	Tasks	Housemates took part in a task in which the house was turned into a "cattery" with them dressing up as cats for the day. They were given nine lives, and throughout the task, were set various challenges in which they had to complete in order to keep at least one life intact. The housemates also had to consume their food and drink from cat bowls. Patsy had to chase a laser at various points throughout the day whenever a noise would play into the house, of which she succeeded. Ella was set a secret mission to make "catty comments" to her fellow housemates. Despite doing so, the housemates guessed it was a secret mission and she therefore lost a life. Danny, Donna, and Jack were each called to the diary room throughout the task and were presented with a box. Donna refused to open it, however Danny and Jack did and were faced with a "curiosity killed the cat" message meaning they each lost a life. Chris had to wear a "cone of shame" for the remainder of the task which he did so successfully. Angellica was called to the diary room and was told she had to become a "cat burglar" and could enlist the help of one housemate to steal all the milk from the fridge without her fellow housemates knowing; she chose Jack, and they ultimately completed the mission. Housemates were successful in keeping at least one life remaining, and therefore won a karaoke party for that evening.
Day 12	Exits	Daley became the third housemate to be evicted, after receiving the fewest votes to save.
Day 13	Tasks	For the next shopping task, the house was transformed into a family home, which the housemates assuming different roles. Danny and Jack were appointed the roles of mother and father, whilst Donna and JoJo became the grandmother and grandfather respectively. Angellica, Chesney and Patsy became teenagers, whilst Chris and Ella were the toddlers. In order to pass the task, the housemates would have to complete various challenges in order to turn themselves from a "dysfunctional family" into a "perfect family". For the first part of the task Chris and Ella attended "nursery" where they had to learn a memory sequence consisting of different moves. They failed to do so correctly and therefore failed this part of the task. Angellica, Chesney and Patsy had to learn a viral social media dance craze and perform it, which was then uploaded to the Big Brother social media page in which the public would decide whether they passed or failed. They chose the former and they therefore passed this part of the task. For the next part of the task, Donna and JoJo visited the "bingo hall" in which balls would roll down from the machine and they would be given a question about their fellow housemates and had to correctly guess the same answer as they did. If they matched an answer correctly, they could mark off a square with a dabber and once they had completed a line, they could shout bingo and finish the game. They passed this part of the task. Big Brother was also satisfied that Danny and Jack fulfilled their parental duties and subsequently announced that housemates had successfully transformed themselves into a "perfect family". They therefore passed the shopping task and received a luxury shopping budget.
Day 14	Nominations	Housemates nominated for the final time, this time they were required to nominate face-to-face by placing easter eggs in the baskets of the housemates they wished to nominate. Angellica, Chris, Ella and Patsy received the most nominations, along with JoJo, however as JoJo selected the "golden egg", she was granted safety from eviction and replaced herself with Danny, who ultimately faced the public vote.
Day 14	Twists	Following the face-to-face nominations, Big Brother announced that one housemate would have the opportunity to save themselves from eviction and choose another housemate to face the public vote in their place. Each of the nominated housemates selected an egg from the basket in the middle of the room, and whichever housemate selected the "golden egg" would be able to save and replace. JoJo received the "golden egg" and chose to save herself, before choosing Danny to replace her and therefore face eviction.
Day 14	Tasks	For "Easter Egg-stravaganza", housemates took part in an easter egg hunt where they were tasked with solving clues in order to find the eggs hidden around the house by former housemate Michael, who made a secret returned to the house earlier in the day dressed an "easter bunny", unbeknownst to the housemates. The clues were related to an event or comment made by a housemate in an area of the house, and they had to correctly identify the location in order to find the eggs.
Day 14	Punishments	As a result of discussing nominations, Angellica and Ella were sent to jail in the garden and had to remain there until further notice.
Day 15	Tasks	JoJo was called to the diary room and was set a secret mission by Big Brother in which she had to learn about British traditions, laws and the Royal Family from her other housemates in order to pass "Big Brother's British Citizenship Test". However unbeknownst to her, the other housemates were informed of JoJo's secret mission and were told that in order for them to pass, they would have to ensure she failed the test by giving her misinformation. They were successful in doing so and won a British themed party for that evening.
Day 16	Tasks	Big Brother called Patsy to the diary room and informed her that she would be holding a rejuvenation retreat in the garden. As part of the retreat, housemates took part in a cacao ceremony and laughter therapy, before embarking on a "talking stick" ceremony, the aim of which was for housemates to talk about any resentments they held against each other. The retreat concluded with the housemates taking part in ecstatic dancing.
Day 16	Exits	Angellica, Ella and Patsy became the fourth, fifth and sixth housemates to be evicted respectively, after receiving the fewest votes to save.
Day 17	Tasks	Big Brother appointed Donna as a delivery driver, and at various points throughout the day she would have to collect a parcel from the diary room, and deliver it to a housemate of her choice. She opted to give Chris the "chain mail" parcel, in which he would have to be chained to another housemate of Donna's choice until further notice. She chose Danny. As they failed to remain chained together on several occasions, they failed this part of the task. The next parcel was a "fragile" box containing a wine bottle inside, and the housemate Donna chose would have keep the box with them at all times, ensuring that the bottle did not break. She chose Jack, who successfully passed this part of the task. JoJo received the "spam mail" parcel and had five minutes to eat a tin of spam. She did so successfully. At the end of the task, Big Brother was satisfied with Donna's professionalism as a delivery and received a "five star rating". Housemates were subsequently rewarded with their letters from home.
Day 19	Exits	Chris and Chesney left the house in sixth and fifth place respectively. Donna left the house in fourth place and JoJo left the house in third place. Jack was then announced as the winner, leaving Danny as the runner-up.

== Production ==
In November 2024, prior to the final of the twenty-first civilian series, it was announced that Celebrity Big Brother would return on ITV in 2025, as well as another civilian series, in celebration of Big Brother's 25th anniversary, with Odudu and Best returning as presenters. As in the previous series, the series aired exclusively on the main ITV network whilst the spin off series Celebrity Big Brother: Late & Live again aired on ITV2, with the Celebrity Big Brother: Live Stream airing daily on ITVX.

=== House ===
In December 2024, it was reported that ITV would move from the house located at Garden Studios to a new location in London ahead of the upcoming twenty-fourth celebrity series. The following month, it was announced that the house would be built at Titan Studios, rendering it the fourth house to be used for the series since the show's inception. The spin-off show Celebrity Big Brother: Late & Live was filmed in the neighbouring Versa Studios, who also acquired Titan Studios as a part of their expansion prior to the launch. Speaking on the new location, Jody Collins, director of Initial, the production company behind the show, said "The most iconic house on television has found a new home, and we couldn’t be more delighted. The needs of the production are substantial and Versa [Studios] is uniquely equipped to meet these demands. Expect a season filled with exceptional and unforgettable reality moments—we cannot wait!". Meanwhile, Charlie Ingall, the executive director of the studios said: "Versa’s expansion in London has been part of our ambitious growth strategy, and it further elevates our business as a first choice for large scale, high profile productions such as Big Brother. The significant investment we have made in this expansion gives us the ability to create long term homes for our clients, and in turn support the television and film community."

House photos were revealed on 4 April 2025, three days before the show's launch. Despite moving to a new location, the house maintained a similar structure to the previous series, but with updated colour schemes, primarily red and gold. The "paint dripping" theme used for the twenty-first civilian series is also replicated throughout the house, whilst the diary room chair is similar to that of the civilian series, with the chair's frame resembling "dripping paint", however instead has gold cushioning, as well as gold stars added to the frame. A red curtain backdrop was also added to the diary room. For this series, the mezzanine floor, which has featured since the show's revival on ITV, was removed, with the house becoming single storey again. The kitchen follows a blue and gold colour scheme, whilst the bathroom retains a similar colour scheme to the civilian series, consisting of mostly teal, pinks and purples, but with added spots of gold and a star in centre of the floor. In a further change for this series, the bedroom and garden are visible from the living area, with the former becoming directly accessible from a transparent glass door in the living area rather than via the corridor. The bedroom also follows the red and gold theme, with both single and double beds available and a vanity station. The garden follows a multi-coloured theme, also primarily red. It includes a red carpet with gold stars on which runs down from the upper area of the garden; which features a seating area, down onto the artificial grass. The grass features a larger gold star inside bigger green star shapes. The garden also features a hot tub and various sun loungers, as well as the "snug", a new separate room.

=== Trailer and eye logo ===
In February 2025, during the final of the second series of Love Island: All Stars, the first trailer for the series aired which featured Love Island narrator Iain Stirling seemingly introducing "the return" of the former, however the screen subsequently changes and Marcus Bentley interrupts to announce the return of Celebrity Big Brother. The trailer also featured the new eye logo, which retains the same "paint dripping" design as the twenty-first civilian series, but instead features a "star" in the centre. In March 2025, a further trailer began airing which featured a guinea pig stood on a red carpet whilst camera's from the paparazzi flash around it. The star from the eye eye logo subsequently flashes in the guinea pig's eye, whilst Bentley narrates with the tagline, "The original celebrity experiment returns". A full length trailer began airing later that month, which featured various guinea pigs, one of which crawls through a tube before they all step out of cars and onto a red carpet. They are subsequently seen walking along a smaller model of the outdoor Big Brother set and into the house, with cardboard figures as the audience. Voice snippets are added from the hosts with Best stating "This is Celebrity Big Brother, whilst Odudu can be heard saying the "Please do not swear" catchphrase, prior to Bentley repeating the same tagline from the initial trailer.

== Release ==
=== Broadcast ===
The series began with a 90-minute live launch show airing on ITV1. It aired on 7 April 2025 and ran for 19 days, and covered over 17 episodes, airing six nights a week from Sunday to Friday on ITV1, with six of these episodes being 90-minute shows, this includes the launch, live evictions and the finale. The Monday to Friday episodes aired at 9pm, whilst Sunday episodes aired at 10pm due to the broadcast of the ITV drama Grace in the former slot. Celebrity Big Brother: Late & Live follows afterwards on ITV2, airing from 10pm until 11pm from Monday to Friday, and from 11pm until 12am on Sundays. The "celebrity house guest" panelists for this series consisted of David Potts, who won the previous series of the show, Tiffany Pollard who was a housemate on the seventeenth series, and Oti Mabuse respectively, who each appear in a week's worth of episodes. Following this, the Celebrity Big Brother: Live Stream will cover live feed from the house "into the small hours every night" on ITVX, which aired seven nights a week from 11pm until 2am from Monday to Friday, from 9pm until 2am on Saturdays and from 12am until 2am on Sundays. For the first time in the show's history, the Live Stream also aired simultaneously on YouTube. The series concluded with a 90-minute finale episode.

== Ratings ==
	Official viewers (millions)		
	Week 1	Week 2	Week 3
Sunday		2.21	N/A
Monday	2.71	2.53	2.43
Tuesday	2.60	2.59	N/A
Wednesday	2.58	N/A	N/A
Thursday	2.36	2.31	N/A
Friday	2.37	N/A	2.24
Series average	N/A		
Blue-coloured boxes denote live shows. Episodes with N/A in the box were outside the weekly Top 50 and were not reported on the BARB website
