= Elliot Balchin =

British actor (b. 1990)

- Born: 30 June 1990 (age 35)
- Occupation: Actor
- Years active: 1999–present

Elliot Balchin (born 30 June 1990) is a British actor who has had roles in various British television series.

== Early life and career ==
In 1999, Balchin joined a Nottingham drama workshop run by ITV and remained for ten years. From 2006 until 2009 he also participated in the National Theatre Connections scheme. In 2009 he began a three-year acting course at LAMDA.

In 2002, he secured a stage role in Ethel and Ernest at the Nottingham Playhouse. Balchin has had roles in the BBC medical shows Doctors and Casualty plus the ITV dramas Bernard's Watch and Peak Practice. In 2008, he appeared in the short film titled Lamb playing Johnny.

In January 2013, Balchin tweeted that he had joined the cast of Channel 4 soap opera Hollyoaks. It was later confirmed that he would play the role of Kevin Foster. On 20 August 2013, Balchin revealed that he would be returning to Hollyoaks for a guest appearance. In 2017, Balchin played Private Peters in the film Journey's End. In 2018, Balchin appeared in Holby City the episode "Family Ties" as Dan Chambers. In 2020, Balchin appeared as Leather Jacket in the British film Solitary. In 2021, Balchin appeared in the film Off Your Head. Balchin also played Frank Sprague in an episode of The Engineering That Built The World.

== Filmography ==
| Title | Role |
|---|---|
| Peak Practice | Owen |
| Doctors | Jamie |
| Bernard's Watch | Sam |
| Casualty | Luke |
| The Tulse Luper Suitcase | Eric |
| Lamb | Johnny |
| Timelarks | Bilic Pertrovsky |
| Private | Jake |
| Strange Meetings | Private Austin |
| A Funny Thing Happened on the Way to the Forum | Hero |
| Hollyoaks | Kevin Foster |
| Journey's End | Private Peters |
| Holby City | Dan Chambers |
| Solitary | Leather Jacket |
| Off Your Head | N/A |
| The Engineering That Built The World | Frank Sprague |
