= Gabby Allen =

English television personality (born 1992)

- Born: Gabrielle Dawn Allen; 6 February 1992 (age 34); Knowsley, Merseyside, England
- Occupation: Television personality
- Years active: 2017–present
- Known for: Love Island; Celebrity Big Brother; The Challenge; Love Island: All Stars; Love Island Games

Gabrielle Dawn Allen (born 6 February 1992) is an English television personality. In 2017, she appeared as a contestant on the third series of the ITV2 dating show Love Island. She subsequently went on to appear in Celebrity Big Brother (2018) and The Challenge: Double Agents (2020–2021). In 2025, she won the second series of Love Island: All Stars.

== Life and career ==
Gabrielle Dawn Allen was born on 6 February 1992 in Knowsley, Merseyside, and was raised in Allerton, Liverpool. Prior to appearing on television, she worked as a dancer and fitness instructor. In 2017, she became a contestant on the third series of the ITV2 reality dating show Love Island. She entered the villa as a "bombshell" on Day 7, alongside Tyne-Lexy Clarson. She coupled up with Marcel Somerville and the pair subsequently reached the final, finishing in fourth place. They entered a relationship, however they split up the following year due to Somerville's infidelity.

In 2018, Allen entered the Celebrity Big Brother house to compete as a housemate on the twenty-second series. She reached the final on Day 26, and finished in sixth place. She subsequently went on to appear in an episode of Celebrity Ghost Hunt. In 2020, Allen appeared on The Challenge: Double Agents. The series concluded in 2021, with Allen being eliminated in episode 13. In 2025, it was announced that Allen would return to Love Island to appear as a contestant on the second series of Love Island: All Stars.

In 2026 Allen took part in the celebrity version of the Channel 4 show SAS: Who Dares Wins, finishing as joint winner alongside Dani Dyer and Emily Seebohm.

== Filmography ==
As herself
Year	Title	Notes	Ref.
2017	Love Island	Contestant; series 3	
2018	Celebrity Big Brother	Housemate; series 22	
2018	Celebrity Ghost Hunt	Guest; 1 episode	
2020–2021	The Challenge	Contestant; The Challenge: Double Agents	
2025	Love Island: All Stars	Contestant; series 2	
2025	Love Island Games	Contestant; season 2	
2026	Celebrity SAS Who Dares Wins	Contestant; series 8	
2026	Celebs Go Dating	Participant; Series 15	
