= Chris Hughes (TV personality) =

English TV personality (born 1992)

- Born: 22 December 1992 (age 33); Gloucestershire, England
- Occupations: Television personality; model
- Years active: 2017–present
- Partner: JoJo Siwa (2025-present)

Christopher Hughes (born 22 December 1992) is an English television personality and sports presenter. In 2017, he appeared on the third series of the ITV2 reality series Love Island, after which he briefly embarked on a music career alongside co-star Kem Cetinay in the duo Chris & Kem.

== Early life ==
Hughes was born on 22 December 1992 in Gloucestershire to Paul, a farmer, and Valerie Hughes. He has one brother, Ben Hughes, as well as three half-brothers.

== Career ==
In 2017, he was announced as one of the contestants for the third series of the ITV2 reality programme Love Island. He reached the finale, finishing in third place alongside Olivia Attwood. Later that year, he starred alongside Kem Cetinay in the ITV2 spin-off series Chris & Kem: Straight Outta Love Island. Following the series, he played football for the Gloucestershire club Bourton Rovers F.C. making 13 appearances, and also played for his local cricket side Bourton Vale CC, and the celebrity Tailenders cricket team against a Test Match Special XI.

That same year, he became an ambassador for Campaign Against Living Miserably and launched the L'Eau de Chris campaign with Topman to raise awareness of men's mental health and the stigma around bottling up emotions

As part of Chris & Kem, he charted at number 15 on the UK Singles Chart with the song "Little Bit Leave It".

In 2018, he starred alongside Attwood in the reality series Chris and Olivia: Crackin' On. In the same year, he co-starred in the game show, You Vs. Chris & Kem. The series ran for two seasons until 2019. His debut book, My Life Story: You Bantering Me, was also published. He was also named as the brand ambassador for Coral's Champions Club.

In November 2018, Hughes took a live testicular exam on This Morning, to raise awareness of testicular cancer, during which he revealed that he had undergone several operations after discovering a varicocele at age 14. In January 2019, his brother Ben was diagnosed with testicular cancer after checking himself following Hughes's television appearance. Later that year, Hughes starred alongside his brother in the BBC Three documentary Me, My Brother And Our Balls, which explored male fertility and testicular cancer.

From 2019 to 2025, he presented live horse racing coverage with ITV Racing.

From 2021 to 2025, he presented BBC Sport coverage of The Hundred cricket tournament.

In September 2023, Channel 4 announced Hughes as a participant on "Don't Look Down" in aid of Stand Up to Cancer (UK)

In April 2025, Hughes entered the Celebrity Big Brother house to appear as a housemate on the twenty-fourth series.

In February 2026, Hughes contributed to the BBC's coverage of the 2026 Winter Olympics, providing behind-the-scenes content.

== Personal life ==
From January 2019 to April 2020, he dated former Little Mix member Jesy Nelson.

In August 2021, Hughes confirmed he was in a relationship with professional golfer Annabel Dimmock, which later ended in June 2022.

Since May 2025, Hughes has been in a relationship with American dancer and media personality JoJo Siwa, whom he met earlier that year while appearing on Celebrity Big Brother.

He is a supporter of Sunderland A.F.C.

== Filmography ==
As himself
Year	Title	Role	Notes
2017	Love Island	Contestant	Finished in 3rd place, series 3
2017	Chris & Kem Straight Outta Love Island	Himself	Reality series
2018	Chris and Olivia: Crackin' On	Himself	3 episodes
2018	Celebrity Hunted	Contestant	Runner up
2018–2019	You Vs. Chris & Kem	Himself	6 episodes
2019	Tipping Point: Lucky Stars	Contestant	Game show
2019	Love Island: Aftersun	Guest	1 episode
2019	Cheltenham Festival	Presenter	Horse racing
2019	Royal Ascot	Presenter	Horse racing
2019	Me, My Brother And Our Balls	Himself	BBC Three documentary
2021	Rise of the Footsoldier: Origins	Football fan	Bit part
2022	Queens for the Night	Orla Feelz	Contestant; finished in 3rd place.
2023	Don't Look Down	Participant	Channel 4 series In aid of Stand Up to Cancer
2024	Pointless Celebrities	Contestant	BBC One
2025	Celebrity Big Brother	Housemate; series 24	ITV1
2025	Celebrity Masterchef	Contestant	BBC One
2026	The Hit List	Contestant	BBC One
2026	The Celebrity Inner Circle	Himself	BBC One
2026	NFL on 5	Himself	
