= Robert McGladdery =

Convicted murderer; executed in 1961

Robert Andrew McGladdery
- Born: 18 October 1935
- Died: 20 December 1961 (aged 26); Crumlin Road Gaol, Belfast, Northern Ireland
- Status: Executed by hanging
- Conviction: Murder (16 October 1961)
- Penalty: Death

Details
- Victims: Pearl Gamble, 19
- Date: 28 January 1961

Robert Andrew McGladdery (18 October 1935 – 20 December 1961) was the last person to be executed in Northern Ireland and the island of Ireland.

He was convicted of the murder of Pearl Gamble, aged 19, whom he had battered, strangled and stabbed to death on 28 January 1961 and whose body was discovered at Upper Damolly, near Newry, County Down. It transpired the murderer and victim were distant cousins. Gamble had gone to a dance at the Henry Thomson Memorial Orange Hall (located on a site that would become a Maxol petrol station beside the telephone exchange) in Newry with three girlfriends. She had been seen dancing with her boyfriend and Robert McGladdery.

The murder investigations led to McGladdery. When interviewed, he stated to have worn a dark blue suit but other people at the dance said he wore a light-coloured one. He was put under surveillance and was discreetly seen to go to some undergrowth on 10 February 1961. The following day, the police discovered, inside a pillow case in a septic tank, an overcoat, a waistcoat and a handkerchief, all of which were heavily bloodstained. McGladdery was arrested on the same day.

At his trial in Downpatrick, McGladdery pleaded his innocence but was found guilty and sentenced to death on 16 October 1961. The evening before his execution he allegedly made a full confession to the murder. He was hanged, aged 26, at Crumlin Road Gaol in Belfast on 20 December 1961, by executioner Harry Allen.

A BBC Northern Ireland dramatisation of the case, Last Man Hanging, was broadcast on 8 September 2008. McGladdery was portrayed by Michael Condron.

The murder and subsequent execution is the theme of Eoin McNamee's 2010 novel, Orchid Blue.
