= Love Island (2015 TV series) series 3 =

2017 series of Love Island

Love Island
- Series 3
- Presented by: Caroline Flack
- No. of days: 52
- No. of contestants: 32
- Winners: Kem Cetinay; Amber Davies
- Runners-up: Jamie Jewitt; Camilla Thurlow
- Companion show: Love Island: Aftersun
- No. of episodes: 43

Release
- Original network: ITV2
- Original release: 5 June – 24 July 2017

Series chronology
- ← Previous; Series 2 Next → Series 4

The third series of Love Island began on 5 June 2017 hosted by Caroline Flack on ITV2. The series concluded on 24 July 2017. It is the third from the current revived series, but fifth overall. The series was narrated by Iain Stirling. As well as the series airing every night of the week with the Saturday episode being used as a weekly catch-up entitled Love Island: The Weekly Hot List, a new spin-off was confirmed, Love Island: Aftersun hosted by Flack with a studio audience and celebrity guests on Sunday nights after the main show. During the final Aftersun episode of the series, which was presented live from outside the villa, it was announced that there would be a one-off reunion special airing on 30 July 2017 which included all of the Islanders from the series.

On 28 June 2017, it was confirmed that a second villa would be introduced to the show for the first time ever in a twist designed to put the couples to the ultimate test. Eleven new Islanders were introduced during this twist. Mike Thalassitis and Sam Gowland became the first Islanders to return to the villa having been dumped from the island, after being voted back in by the public.

On 24 July 2017, the series was won by Amber Davies and Kem Cetinay, with Camilla Thurlow and Jamie Jewitt as runners-up. The average viewers for this series was 2.52 million, up 1.05 million on the previous series.

Shortly after the final, Cetinay and Chris Hughes released their debut single "Little Bit Leave It" as Chris & Kem. In 2018, Cetinay went onto participate in the tenth series of Dancing on Ice, whilst Jonny Mitchell took part in the twenty-first series of Celebrity Big Brother. It was also announced that Thalassitis would be joining the cast of Celebs Go Dating, and that Chyna Ellis had signed up for Ibiza Weekender. Gowland also joined Geordie Shore from the sixteenth series. In August 2018, Gabby Allen took part in the twenty-second series of Celebrity Big Brother, Montana Brown joins Celebrity Island with Bear Grylls, Olivia Attwood heads around Celebs Go Dating. In 2019, Georgia Harrison and Theo Campbell competed on the 33rd and 34th seasons of MTV's The Challenge whilst Thurlow joined the first series of Celebrity SAS: Who Dares Wins. In 2020, Allen competed on the 36th season of MTV's The Challenge.

== Production ==
On Valentine's Day, 14 February 2017, it was confirmed that Love Island would return for a third series due to air later in the year, The first trailer for the new series began airing on 28 April 2017. On 24 May 2017 it was confirmed that the series would begin on 5 June 2017. Pictures of the brand new villa were unveiled on 2 June 2017. The villa is located in Mallorca.

== Islanders ==
The Islanders for the third series were revealed on 29 May 2017, just a week before the launch. However, throughout the series, more Islanders entered the villa to find love. Some Islanders were dumped from the island for either failing to couple up, some were voted off by their fellow Islanders, and others for receiving the fewest votes in public eliminations. The series was won by Amber Davies and Kem Cetinay on 24 July 2017.

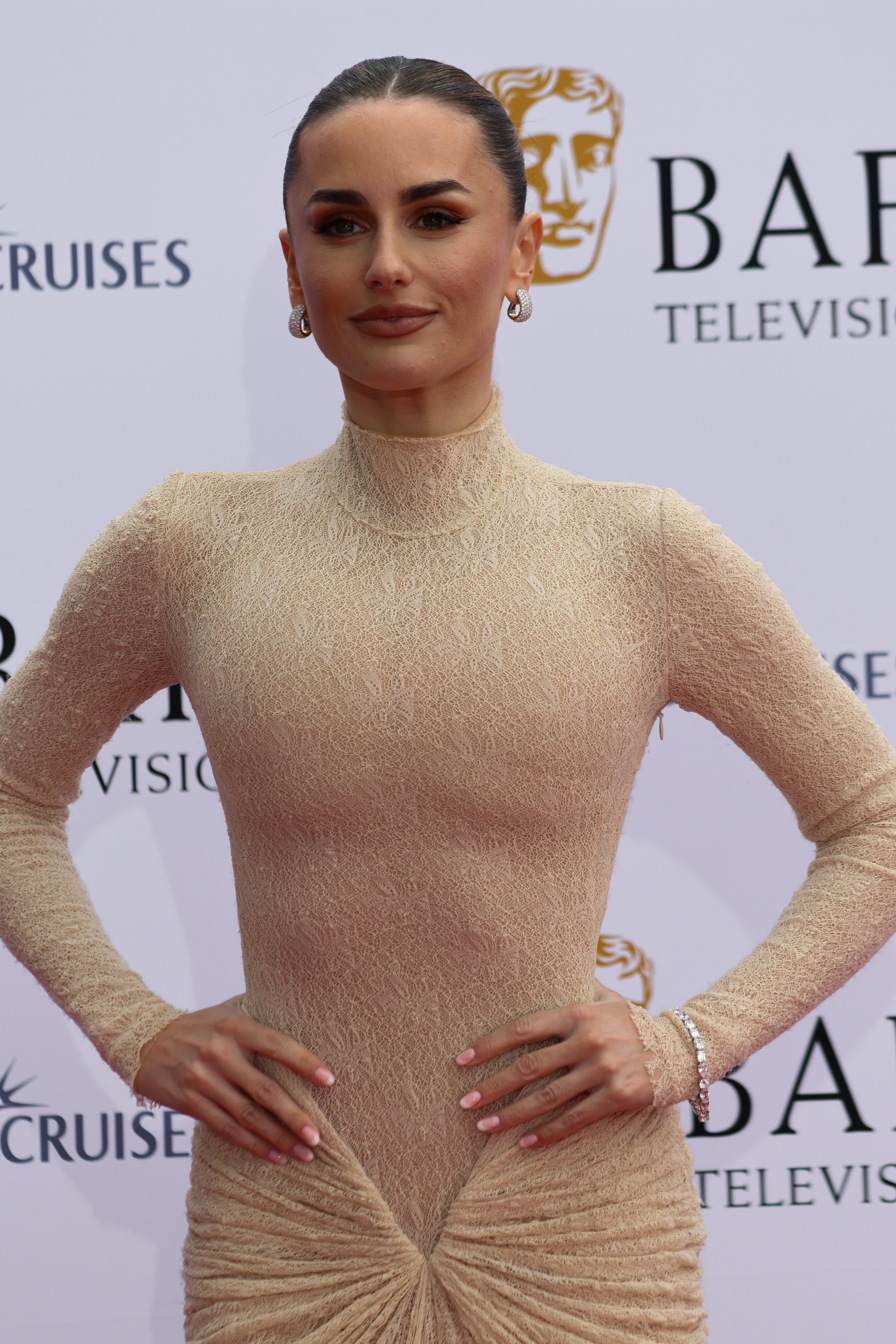
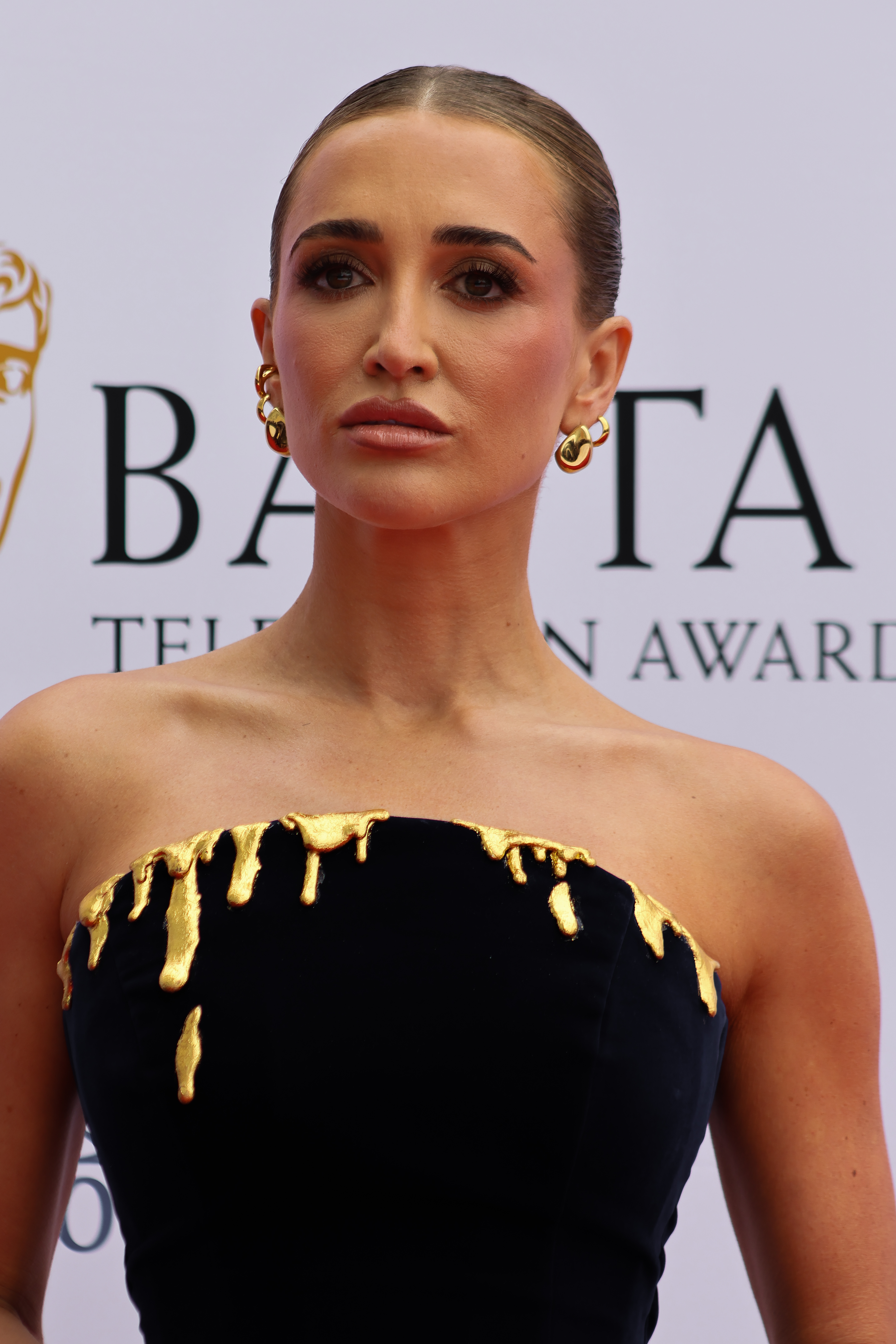
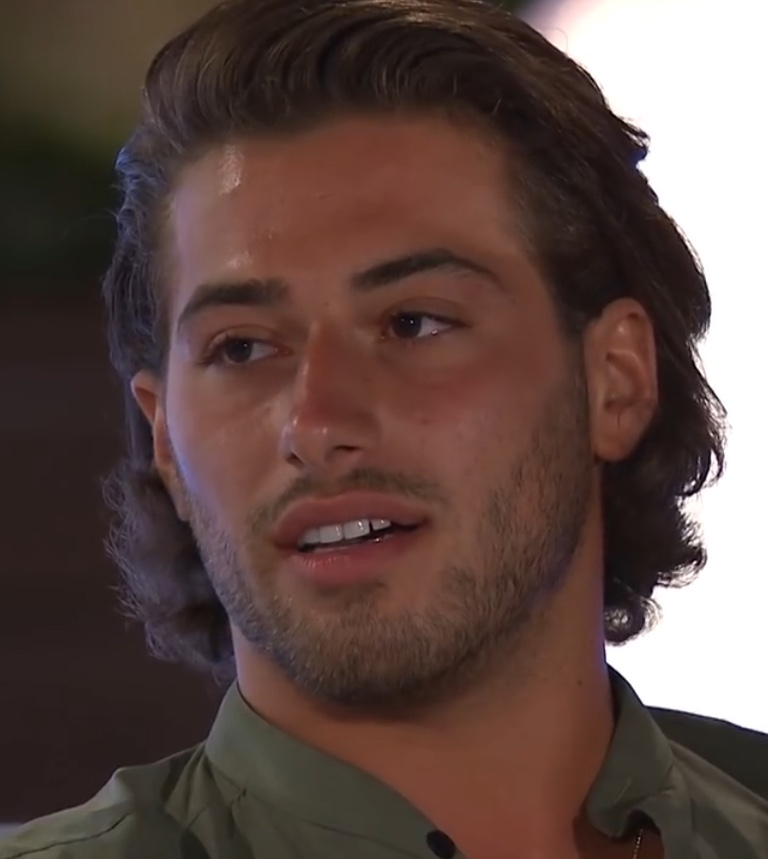
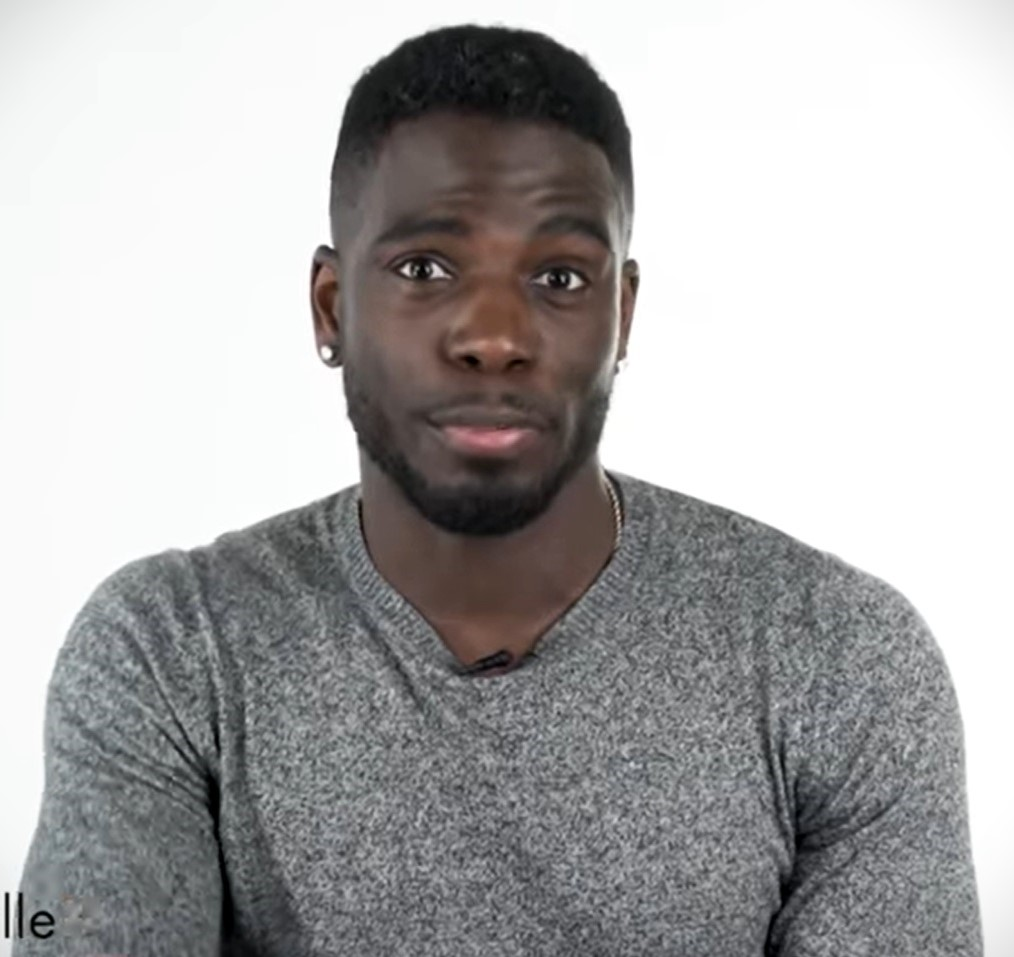
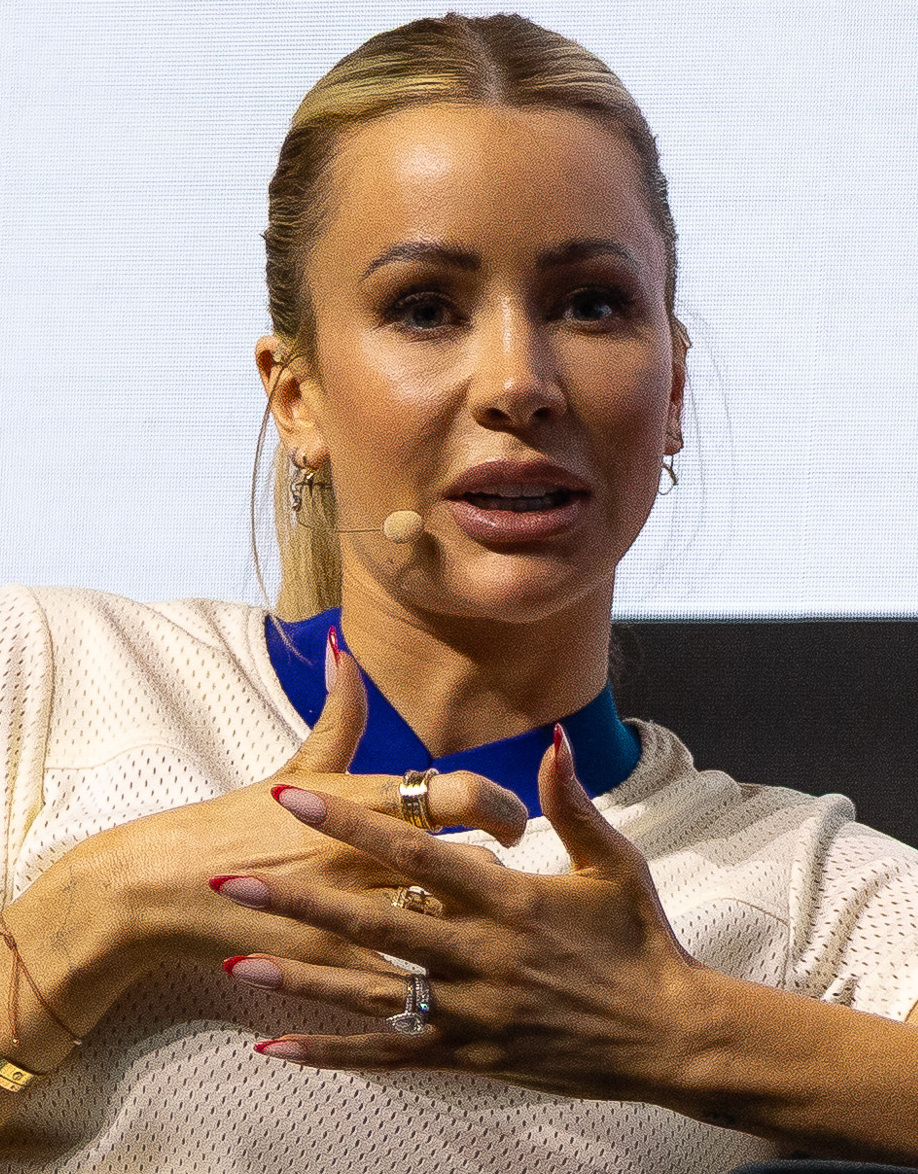
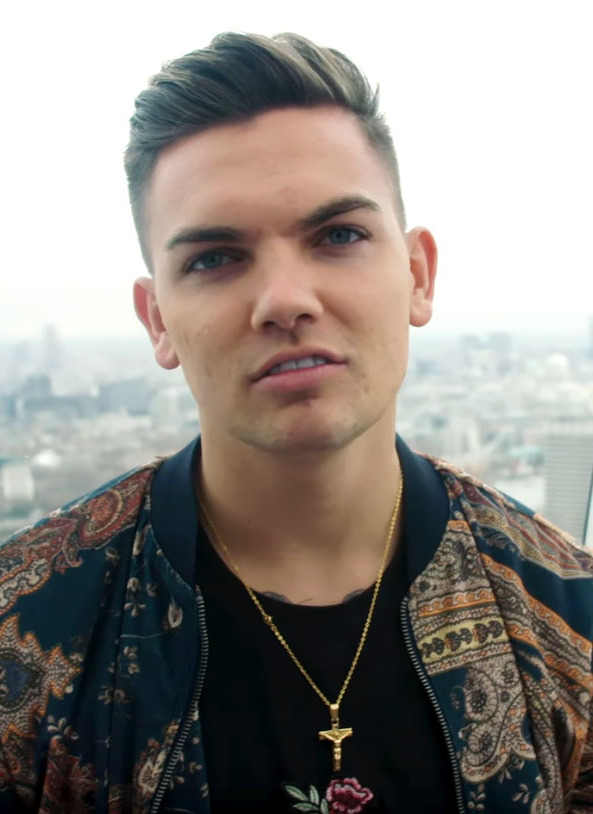
From left to right: Amber Davies, Georgia Harrison, Kem Cetinay, Marcel Somerville, Mike Thalassitis, Olivia Attwood and Sam Gowland

Islander	Age	Hometown	Entered	Exited	Status	Ref
Amber Davies	20	North Wales	Day 1	Day 52	Winner	
Kem Cetinay	21	Essex	Day 1	Day 52	Winner	
Camilla Thurlow	27	Dumfries	Day 1	Day 52	Runner-up	
Jamie Jewitt	27	Essex	Day 32	Day 52	Runner-up	
Chris Hughes	24	Cheltenham	Day 4	Day 52	Third place	
Olivia Attwood	26	Guildford	Day 1	Day 52	Third place	
Gabby Allen	25	Liverpool	Day 7	Day 52	Fourth place	
Marcel Somerville	31	London	Day 1	Day 52	Fourth place	
Alex Beattie	22	Newcastle	Day 26	Day 50	Dumped	
Montana Brown	21	Hertfordshire	Day 1	Day 50	Dumped	
Georgia Harrison	22	Essex	Day 34	Day 46	Dumped	
Sam Gowland	21	Middlesbrough	Day 39 (Note: Dumped Islanders Mike and Sam both re-entered the villa after being voted back in by the public.)	Day 46	Re-dumped	
Sam Gowland	21	Middlesbrough	Day 1	Day 23	Dumped	
Mike Thalassitis	24	North London	Day 39	Day 44	Re-dumped	
Mike Thalassitis	24	North London	Day 12	Day 17	Dumped	
Tyla Carr	23	Surrey	Day 19	Day 44	Dumped	
Theo Campbell	25	Bath	Day 32	Day 41	Dumped	
Jonny Mitchell	26	Essex	Day 4	Day 38	Dumped	
Craig Lawson	27	London	Day 26	Day 31	Dumped	
Nathan Joseph	25	Essex	Day 26	Day 31	Dumped	
Danielle Sellers	22	Hastings	Day 26	Day 31	Dumped	
Chyna Ellis	22	Essex	Day 26	Day 31	Dumped	
Amelia Peters	18	London	Day 26	Day 28	Dumped	
Dom Lever	26	Manchester	Day 1	Day 28	Dumped	
Ellisha-Jade White	22	Southampton	Day 26	Day 28	Dumped	
Marino Katsouris	22	Brighton	Day 26	Day 28	Dumped	
Rob Lipsett	25	Dublin	Day 26	Day 28	Dumped	
Shannen McGrath	23	Dublin	Day 26	Day 28	Dumped	
Steve Ball	25	Wiltshire	Day 26	Day 28	Dumped	
Simon Searles	28	Leeds	Day 19	Day 25	Dumped	
Chloë Crowhurst	22	Essex	Day 1	Day 23	Dumped	
Jessica Shears	23	Devon	Day 1	Day 17	Dumped	
Tyne-Lexy Clarson	20	Birmingham	Day 7	Day 14	Dumped	
Harley Judge	22	Norwich	Day 1	Day 6	Dumped	

=== Future appearances ===
In 2024, Georgia Harrison appeared on series one of Love Island: All Stars.

In 2025, Gabby Allen, Danielle Sellers, and Marcel Somerville all returned for series two of Love Island: All Stars. Allen also competed on season two of Love Island Games.

In 2026, Sellers competed on the fourth series of Celebrity Ex on the Beach.

Jonny Mitchell appeared on series 21 of Celebrity Big Brother in 2018. Allen appeared on series 22 later that year. Chris Hughes appeared on series 24 in 2025.

== Coupling and elimination history ==
The couples were chosen shortly after the contestants entered the villa. After all of the girls entered, the boys were asked to choose a girl to pair up with. Marcel was paired with Olivia, Dom with Montana, Sam and Camilla paired up, Amber and Harley coupled up, whilst Chloë paired up with Kem, and Jessica remained single and was told she would be stealing one of the boys the following day. However, throughout the series the couples swapped and changed.

	Week 1			Week 2	Week 3		Week 4				Week 5		Week 6		Week 7		Week 8		Final	
	Day 1	Day 2	Day 6	Day 14	Day 17	Day 20	Day 23	Day 24	Day 25	Day 28	Day 31	Day 34	Day 38	Day 41	Day 44	Day 46	Day 48	Day 50	Final	
Kem	Chloë		Amber	Amber	Safe	Amber	Chloë & Sam; Least compatible	Amber	Safe	Chyna	Safe	Georgia	Safe	Amber	Safe	Safe	Camilla & Jamie to dump	Finalist	Split the £50k	Winner (Day 52)
Amber	Harley		Kem	Kem	Safe	Kem	Chloë & Sam; Least compatible	Kem	Safe	Nathan	Safe	Jonny	Safe	Kem	Safe	Safe	Camilla & Jamie to dump	Finalist	Winner (Day 52)	
Camilla	Sam		Jonny	Jonny	Safe	Jonny	Chris & Olivia; Least compatible	Jonny	Safe	Craig	Safe	Jamie	Safe	Jamie	Safe	Safe	Alex & Montana to dump	Finalist	Runner-up (Day 52)	
Jamie	Not in Villa											Camilla	Safe	Camilla	Safe	Safe	Alex & Montana to dump	Finalist	Runner-up (Day 52)	
Chris	Not in Villa		Chloë	Chloë	Vulnerable	Olivia	Chloë & Sam; Least compatible	Olivia	Safe	Olivia	Safe	Olivia	Safe	Olivia	Safe	Safe	Alex & Montana to dump	Finalist	Third place (Day 52)	
Olivia	Marcel		Sam	Mike	Vulnerable	Chris	Chloë & Sam; Least compatible	Chris	Safe	Chris	Safe	Chris	Safe	Chris	Safe	Safe	Alex & Montana to dump	Finalist	Third place (Day 52)	
Gabby	Not in Villa			Marcel	Safe	Marcel	Chloë & Sam; Least compatible	Marcel	Safe	Marcel	Safe	Marcel	Safe	Marcel	Safe	Vulnerable	Alex & Montana to dump	Finalist	Fourth place (Day 52)	
Marcel	Olivia		Montana	Gabby	Safe	Gabby	Chloë & Sam; Least compatible	Gabby	Safe	Gabby	Danielle to dump	Gabby	Safe	Gabby	Safe	Vulnerable	Alex & Montana to dump	Finalist	Fourth place (Day 52)	
Alex	Not in Villa									Montana	Safe	Montana	Safe	Montana	Safe	Vulnerable	Gabby & Marcel to dump	Eliminated	Dumped (Day 50)	
Montana	Dom	Single	Marcel	Sam	Safe	Simon	Chloë & Sam; Least compatible	Dom	Safe	Alex	Craig to dump	Alex	Safe	Alex	Safe	Vulnerable	Gabby & Marcel to dump	Eliminated	Dumped (Day 50)	
Georgia	Not in Villa											Kem	Safe	Sam	Safe	Eliminated	Dumped (Day 46)			
Sam	Camilla		Olivia	Montana	Safe	Chloë	Camilla & Jonny; Least compatible	Dumped (Day 23)						Georgia	Safe	Eliminated	Re-dumped (Day 46)			
Mike	Not in Villa			Olivia	Vulnerable	Dumped (Day 17)								Tyla	Eliminated	Re-dumped (Day 44)				
Tyla	Not in Villa					Dom	Camilla & Jonny; Least compatible	Simon	Vulnerable	Single	Vulnerable	Theo	Jonny to dump	Mike	Eliminated	Dumped (Day 44)				
Theo	Not in Villa											Tyla	Safe	Single	Dumped (Day 41)					
Jonny	Not in Villa		Camilla	Camilla	Safe	Camilla	Chris & Olivia; Least compatible	Camilla	Safe	Danielle	Vulnerable	Amber	Jonny to dump	Dumped (Day 38)						
Craig	Not in Villa									Camilla	Vulnerable	Dumped (Day 31)								
Danielle	Not in Villa									Jonny	Vulnerable	Dumped (Day 31)								
Chyna	Not in Villa									Kem	Eliminated	Dumped (Day 31)								
Nathan	Not in Villa									Amber	Eliminated	Dumped (Day 31)								
Amelia	Not in Villa									Single	Dumped (Day 28)									
Dom	Montana	Jessica	Jessica	Jessica	Vulnerable	Tyla	Camilla & Jonny; Least compatible	Montana	Safe	Single	Dumped (Day 28)									
Ellisha-Jade	Not in Villa									Single	Dumped (Day 28)									
Marino	Not in Villa									Single	Dumped (Day 28)									
Rob	Not in Villa									Single	Dumped (Day 28)									
Shannen	Not in Villa									Single	Dumped (Day 28)									
Steve	Not in Villa									Single	Dumped (Day 28)									
Simon	Not in Villa					Montana	Chloë & Sam; Least compatible	Tyla	Vulnerable	Dumped (Day 25)										
Chloë	Kem		Chris	Chris	Vulnerable	Sam	Camilla & Jonny; Least compatible	Dumped (Day 23)												
Jessica	Not in Villa	Dom	Dom	Dom	Vulnerable	Dumped (Day 17)														
Tyne-Lexy	Not in Villa			Single	Dumped (Day 14)															
Harley	Amber		Single	Dumped (Day 6)																
Notes	none	1	none		2	none	3	none	4	5	6	none	7	none	8		9	10	11	
Dumped	No; Dumping		Harley; Failed to couple up	Tyne-Lexy; Failed to couple up	Mike; Boys’ choice to dump	No; Dumping	Chloë & Sam; 4 of 7 votes to dump	No; Dumping	Simon; Islander's choice to dump	Amelia, Dom, Ellisha-Jade, Marino, Rob, Shannen, Steve; Failed to couple up	Chyna, Nathan; Public's choice to dump	No; Dumping	Jonny; Jonny and Tyla's choice to dump	Theo; Failed to couple up	Mike & Tyla; Public's choice to dump	Georgia & Sam; Public's choice to dump	No; Dumping	Alex & Montana; Public's choice to dump	Gabby & Marcel; Fewest votes to win	
Dumped	No; Dumping		Harley; Failed to couple up	Tyne-Lexy; Failed to couple up	Mike; Boys’ choice to dump	No; Dumping	Chloë & Sam; 4 of 7 votes to dump	No; Dumping	Simon; Islander's choice to dump	Amelia, Dom, Ellisha-Jade, Marino, Rob, Shannen, Steve; Failed to couple up	Chyna, Nathan; Public's choice to dump	No; Dumping	Jonny; Jonny and Tyla's choice to dump	Theo; Failed to couple up	Mike & Tyla; Public's choice to dump	Georgia & Sam; Public's choice to dump	No; Dumping	Alex & Montana; Public's choice to dump	Chris & Olivia; Third–most votes to win	
Dumped	No; Dumping		Harley; Failed to couple up	Tyne-Lexy; Failed to couple up	Jessica; Girls' choice to dump	No; Dumping	Chloë & Sam; 4 of 7 votes to dump	No; Dumping	Simon; Islander's choice to dump	Amelia, Dom, Ellisha-Jade, Marino, Rob, Shannen, Steve; Failed to couple up	Craig; Montana's choice to dump	No; Dumping	Jonny; Jonny and Tyla's choice to dump	Theo; Failed to couple up	Mike & Tyla; Public's choice to dump	Georgia & Sam; Public's choice to dump	No; Dumping	Alex & Montana; Public's choice to dump	Jamie & Camilla; Second–most votes to win	
Dumped	No; Dumping		Harley; Failed to couple up	Tyne-Lexy; Failed to couple up	Jessica; Girls' choice to dump	No; Dumping	Chloë & Sam; 4 of 7 votes to dump	No; Dumping	Simon; Islander's choice to dump	Amelia, Dom, Ellisha-Jade, Marino, Rob, Shannen, Steve; Failed to couple up	Danielle; Marcel's choice to dump	No; Dumping	Jonny; Jonny and Tyla's choice to dump	Theo; Failed to couple up	Mike & Tyla; Public's choice to dump	Georgia & Sam; Public's choice to dump	No; Dumping	Alex & Montana; Public's choice to dump	Amber & Kem; Most votes to win	

=== Notes ===
- ^Note 1: Jessica arrived after the coupling on Day 1, but was told she would be able to steal a boy for herself on Day 2. She chose Dom, leaving Montana single and vulnerable.
- ^Note 2: On Day 17, the public voted for their favourite couples. after receiving the fewest public votes, Chloë and Chris, Dom and Jessica, and Mike and Olivia were in danger of leaving. The remaining islanders had to choose one boy and one girl to dump from the island. The boys chose Jessica, whilst the girls chose Mike.
- ^Note 3: On Day 23, the islanders voted anonymously in their couple for who they thought was the least compatible. The couple with the most votes would be dumped from the island.
- ^Note 4: On Day 25, the public voted for who they thought were the most compatible couple. The couple with the fewest votes would be vulnerable. The safe islanders then had to vote for one of the vulnerable couple to dump from the island.
- ^Note 5: As the final part for the Casa Amor twist in week 4, Casa Amor and the villa held two separate re-coupling ceremonies for the original islanders to choose whether to return to their previous partner or pick any new partner. Any islanders that remained single by the end of either ceremony was dumped from the island.
- ^Note 6: On Day 31, the public voted for their favourite boy and girl islanders. The islanders with the fewest votes were immediately eliminated. Following this, Marcel was told that he was the boy who received the most votes, and therefore had to choose to dump one more of the girls who received the second and third least. Montana was then told she was the girl who received the most votes, and was told to dump one more of the boys who received the second and third least.
- ^Note 7: On Day 38, the public voted for their favourite Islanders. The couple who received the fewest votes was therefore in danger of being dumped. It was then up to those two to decide which of them should leave.
- ^Note 8: The public voted for their favorite couples. The top couples who received the most votes were granted safety. The couple who received the fewest votes were dumped from the villa.
- ^Note 9: On Day 48, the couple voted for the couple they wanted to dump from the island. The couples who received the most votes were vulnerable of being dumped from the island. The couple who did receive any votes were safe and became finalist.
- ^Note 10: The public voted for their favorite couples. The couple with the fewest votes was dumped from the island.
- ^Note 11: The public voted for which couple they think should win Love Island. The couple with the most votes were declared the winners of Love Island and received the grand prize money.

== Casa Amor ==
On 28 June 2017, it was confirmed that a second villa would be introduced to the show for the first time ever in a twist designed to put the couples to the ultimate test. Eleven new Islanders were introduced during this twist. The villa was called "Casa Amor" which translates to Love House, and is located not far from the main villa. The new Islanders for the twist included five girls; Amelia, Chyna, Danielle, Ellisha-Jade and Shannen, as well as six boys; Alex, Craig, Marino, Nathan, Rob and Steve.

- On Day 26, the boys in the villa (Chris, Dom, Jonny, Kem and Marcel) were told that they would be briefly leaving the villa for a day out. They were then sent to Casa Amor where they discovered they would be staying there for the next few days. Back in the main villa, the girls (Amber, Camilla, Gabby, Montana, Olivia and Tyla) had to pack the boy's belongings before they were joined by Caroline Flack who revealed the twist to them. Shortly afterwards the girls were joined by the new male Islanders, and the boys in Casa Amor were welcomed by the new female Islanders. That night the Islanders from each villa went head-to-head with each other in a game of sexy charades.
- On Day 27, the Islanders in the main villa and Casa Amor once again went head-to-head with each other once again in another challenge. This time each team had to complete and number of challenges in the fastest time possible. The team who completed it the quickest earned a point, and at the end of the round the villa with the most points were rewarded with a party.
- On Day 28, the original Islanders were told that they would be re-coupling. They were only given the option to remain in their current couple or to choose one of the new Islanders. However, as the boys and the girls were living in separate villas, they weren't aware of what the other one chose. If one decided to re-couple and the other did not, then the one that did not would be dumped from the island. If both re-coupled then they would both remain in the villa with their new partner, or if they both remained then any remaining single Islanders would be eliminated. Olivia and Chris, and Gabby and Marcel both stayed loyal, whereas Amber and Kem both decided to re-couple with Nathan and Chyna respectively. Camilla and Jonny also decided to re-couple, choosing Craig and Danielle. Elsewhere Montana decided to re-couple with Alex, but Dom stayed loyal and therefore was dumped from the Island. As new Islanders Amelia, Ellisha-Jade, Marino, Rob, Shannen and Steve stayed single, they were eliminated.

== Weekly summary ==
The main events in the Love Island villa are summarised in the table below.

Week 1	Entrances	On Day 1, Amber, Camilla, Chloë, Dom, Harley, Jessica, Kem, Marcel, Montana, Olivia and Sam entered the villa.; On Day 4, Chris and Jonny entered the villa.
Week 1	Coupling	On Day 1, the Islanders coupled up for the first time. After all of the girls entered, the boys were asked to choose a girl to pair up with. Marcel was paired with Olivia, Dom with Montana, Sam and Camilla paired up, Amber and Harley coupled up, whilst Chloë paired up with Kem, and Jessica remained single, however was told she would be stealing one of the boys the following day.; On Day 2, Jessica chose to couple up with Dom, leaving Montana single.; On Day 6, the Islanders re-coupled. This time it was the girls who had to pick a boy to pair up with. As Jessica already coupled up with Dom, they were automatically coupled up during this re-coupling. Montana chose to be with Marcel, Chloë picked Chris, Olivia coupled up with Sam, whilst Amber went with Kem. Camilla also decided to be with Jonny leaving Harley single, and therefore dumping him from the island.
Week 1	Challenges	On Day 2, the Islanders took part in "A Lot Of Bottle", where the girls were selected at random to answer a question, with one of the boys being the answer. To answer the question the girls had to kiss the chosen boy. The roles then reversed with the boys answering questions about the girls.; On Day 4, the girls hosted a welcome party to introduce the new boys Chris and Jonny.; On Day 5, through touch alone, the girls had to decide which of the boys had the best body. However, as there was a wall between the girls and the boys, they did not know which body belonged to who. In the end Chris was chosen as the winner.And Sam was the loser with 0 points; On Day 6, the Islanders took part in a relay lilo race. The winning team received ice lollies.
Week 1	Dates	On Day 2, as the newest couple, Dom and Jessica left the villa to go on a date.; On Day 4, the public voted for which girls to send on a date with new Islanders Chris and Jonny. Camilla was sent on a date with Jonny, whilst Montana was chosen to date Chris.; On Day 5, as a reward for winning the challenge, Chris was given the opportunity to date a girl of his choice. He chose Chloë.; On Day 5, despite losing the challenge, Sam was given the opportunity to make up for it by going on a date. He chose to date Olivia.
Week 1	Exits	On Day 6, Harley was eliminated after failing to couple up.
Week 2	Entrances	On Day 7, Gabby and Tyne-Lexy entered the villa.; On Day 12, Mike entered the villa.
Week 2	Challenges	On Day 7, the Islanders had to do dares that they randomly picked from a cup.; On Day 9, the Islanders took part in a "Kissing Contest" where the girls had to individually kiss each of the boys, then wait for them to rate it. Gabby, Montana and Tyne-Lexy all won the contest in joint first.; On Day 10, the Islanders took part in "Love Island Sports Day".; On Day 12, the girls were given the option to take part in "Battle of the Bootie", with the reward for the winner being a date with a new Islander. The Islanders that decided to take part were Camilla, Chloë, Gabby, Montana and Tyne-Lexy. Tyne-Lexy was the winner of the challenge.
Week 2	Dates	On Day 8, as a new Islanders, Gabby and Tyne-Lexy were given the opportunity to date two boys. Gabby chose Chris and Marcel, whilst Tyne-Lexy dated Chris and Dom.; On Day 9, Amber and Kem left the villa to go on a date.; On Day 9, Dom and Jessica were chosen by the other Islanders to spend the night in the Hideaway.; On Day 12, after winning a challenge, Tyne-Lexy was rewarded with a date with new Islander Mike.; On Day 13, new Islander Mike was asked to choose three girls to take on a date. He chose Jessica, Montana and Olivia.
Week 3	Entrances	On Day 19, Simon and Tyla entered the villa.
Week 3	Coupling	On Day 14, the Islanders re-coupled once again. This time it was the boys who had to pick a girl to pair up with. Amber and Kem, Camilla and Jonny, Chloë and Chris, and Jessica and Dom remained together, whilst Sam chose to couple up with Montana, Mike picked Olivia, and Gabby paired with Marcel. As Tyne-Lexy remained single, she was dumped from the island.; On Day 20, the Islanders re-coupled again. As new Islanders, Simon and Tyla were able to pick first. Simon chose Montana, whilst Tyla picked Dom. This time it was the girls who had to pick a boy to pair up with. Amber and Kem, Camilla and Jonny, and Gabby and Marcel remained together, whilst Chloe chose to couple up with Sam, and Olivia went with Chris.
Week 3	Challenges	On Day 15, the Islanders took part in a quiz about their other half. The Islanders wrote down the answers to the questions, and if it matched their partner's then they would score a point. Gabby and Marcel won the challenge with the most points.; On Day 16, the couples made smoothies with a twist. One half of the pair had to pass pieces of fruit to the other pair using their mouth alone, who then blended the fruit to make a smoothie. They then had to pass the smoothie back to their partner using their mouth who then deposited it into a glass. Chris and Chloë won this challenge.; On Day 16, Camilla and Jonny hosted a sex positions quiz for the Islanders, where they read out a number of sex positions, and the first couple who acted them out correctly earned a point.
Week 3	Dates	On Day 15, after winning a challenge, Gabby and Marcel were rewarded with a hot tub date.; On Day 19, Jonny and Camilla left the villa to go on a date.; On Day 20, new Islanders Simon and Tyla were asked to choose three other Islanders to take on dates. Tyla chose Jonny, Dom and Chris, whilst Simon chose Amber, Montana and Camilla.
Week 3	Exits	On Day 14, Tyne-Lexy was eliminated after failing to couple up.; On Day 18, after receiving the fewest public votes, Chloë and Chris, Dom and Jessica, and Mike and Olivia were in danger of leaving. The remaining Islanders had to choose one boy and one girl to dump from the island. The boys chose Jessica, whilst the girls chose Mike.
Week 4	Entrances	On Day 26, Alex, Craig, Marino, Nathan, Rob and Steve entered the villa.; On Day 26, Amelia, Chyna, Danielle, Ellisha-Jade and Shannen entered Casa Amor.
Week 4	Coupling	On Day 24, the Islanders re-coupled once again. This time it was the boys who had to pick a girl to pair up with. Amber and Kem, Camilla and Jonny, Gabby and Marcel, and Olivia and Chris remained together, whilst Simon coupled up with Tyla, and Dom was paired with Montana again.
Week 4	Challenges	On Day 21, the couples took part in the "Sexiest Pub Quiz" where all the questions were about sex. Marcel and Gabby were the winners of the challenge and were rewarded with video messages from home.; On Day 23, Amber and Kem hosted as the couples took part in "Brits Abroad" where they played a number of British themed games. Simon and Montana were the overall winners.; On Day 25, the Islanders were given quotes which had been said about them in the villa. The Islanders had to throw a drink over the Islander they thought said the quote.; On Day 26, the Islanders in the main villa took on the Islanders in Casa Amor in a game of sexy charades.; On Day 27, the Islanders in the main villa went head-to-head again with the Islanders in Casa Amor, where they took part in a number of challenges. For every challenge won they would earn a point, where the villa with the most points at the end would receive a party.
Week 4	Dates	On Day 24, Olivia and Chris left the villa to go on a shopping date to buy ingredients which they later cooked for the fellow Islanders.
Week 4	Exits	On Day 23, the couples voted anonymously for who they thought was the least compatible couple. As Chloë and Sam received the most votes, they were dumped from the island and eliminated.; On Day 25, the public voted for who they thought were the most compatible couple. As Simon and Tyla received the fewest votes, their time in the villa was put at risk. The couples then had to vote for either Simon or Tyla to dump from the island. They chose to eliminate Simon.; On Day 26, Chris, Dom, Jonny, Kem and Marcel moved out of the villa and moved into Casa Amor. They returned to the main villa on Day 28.
Week 5	Entrances	On Day 32, Jamie and Theo entered the villa.; On Day 34, Georgia entered the villa.
Week 5	Coupling	On Day 28, the original Islanders were told that they would be re-coupling. They were only given the option to remain in their current couple or to choose one of the new Islanders. However, as the boys and the girls were living in separate villas, they were not aware of what the other one chose. If one decided to re-couple and the other did not, then the one that did not would be dumped from the island. If both re-coupled then they would both remain in the villa with their new partner, or if they both remained then any remaining single Islanders would be eliminated. Olivia and Chris, and Gabby and Marcel both stayed loyal, whereas Amber and Kem both decided to re-couple with Nathan and Chyna respectively. Camilla and Jonny also decided to re-couple, choosing Craig and Danielle. Elsewhere Montana decided to re-couple with Alex, but Dom stayed loyal and therefore was dumped from the Island. As new Islanders Amelia, Ellisha-Jade, Marino, Rob, Shannen and Steve stayed single, they were eliminated.; On Day 34, the Islanders re-coupled once again, this time it was the boys choosing which girl they wanted to couple up with. However new Islander Georgia was given the first choice. She chose to couple up with Kem. Alex and Montana, Chris and Olivia, Gabby and Marcel all decided to remain together, whilst Jamie picked Camilla, Theo chose Tyla, and Jonny was left blinking severely as he called Theo a "gigantic bellend" with Amber.
Week 5	Challenges	On Day 30, the Islanders were split into two teams and were each asked questions based on what the public voted in an online poll. The Islanders had to do a poll dance before revealing their answer.; On Day 32, the Islanders took part in a game of "Sexy Beer pong", where as well as drinking a drink, the Islander also had to perform a dare written on the bottom of the cup.; On Day 33, the boys took part in an assault course, however they had to go through trying to look as sexy as possible. During their performances the girls were distracting them by spraying them with paint. The girls then chose Jamie as the winner.
Week 5	Dates	On Day 29, Alex and Montana were sent to the Hideaway to go on a date.; On Day 32, Amber, Olivia and Tyla were sent on a date with new Islander Theo, whilst Amber, Camilla and Tyla were sent on a date to meet Jamie, another new Islander.; On Day 33, after winning a challenge, Jamie was rewarded with a date with Camilla.
Week 5	Exits	On Day 28, Amelia, Dom, Ellisha-Jade, Marino, Rob, Shannen and Steve were eliminated after failing to couple up.; On Day 31, the public voted for their favourite boy and girl. As Nathan and Chyna received the fewest votes, they were eliminated. Following this, Marcel was told that he was the boy who received the most votes, and therefore had to choose to dump one more out of Danielle and Tyla, the girls who received the second and third least. He chose Danielle. Montana was then told she was the girl who received the most votes, and was told to choose one of Craig and Jonny to dump, as they also received the second and third least. She chose to dump Craig.
Week 6	Entrances	On Day 39, Mike and Sam re-entered the villa.
Week 6	Coupling	On Day 41, the Islanders re-coupled once again. This time it was the girls who chose which boy they wanted to re-couple with. Alex and Montana, Camilla and Jamie, Gabby and Marcel, and Olivia and Chris all remained together, whilst Amber got back together with Kem, Tyla picked Mike, and Georgia chose Sam. As Theo remained single he was dumped from the island.
Week 6	Challenges	On Day 38, the couples took part in a number of sausage themed games. Camilla and Jamie were the overall winners.; On Day 40, the boys had to compete to get the girl's heart racing the most in any way possible. Kem was the winner of this challenge.
Week 6	Dates	On Day 37, Camilla and Jamie spent the night in the Hideaway.; On Day 39, Alex and Montana left the villa to go on a date.
Week 6	Exits	On Day 38, the public voted for their favourite Islanders. Jonny and Tyla received the fewest votes and were therefore in danger of being dumped. It was then up to those two to decide which of them should leave. Jonny decided to sacrifice himself.; On Day 41, after failing to couple up, Theo was dumped from the island.
Week 7
Week 7	Challenges	On Day 42, the couples took part in a quiz about each other, where their answers simply had to match each other's. If the answers did not match, the boys would get dunked. Alex and Montana, and Mike and Tyla were joint winners of this challenge.; On Day 44, the Islanders were split into two teams and were given some tweets from viewers about the Islanders but with the names removed. In order to score points, the teams had to burst a balloon and then correctly identify the name of the Islander on the tweet.; On Day 45, the girls took a lie detector test with the boys asking the questions.; On Day 46, the couples had their parenting skills tested by looking after dolls.; On Day 47, the Islanders took part in a talent contest.; On Day 48, the girls each had to complete an undercover assignment without the boys knowing.
Week 7	Dates	On Day 47, Chris and Olivia, Kem and Amber, and Camilla and Jamie all left the villa to go on their final Love Island date.; On Day 48, Gabby and Marcel, and Alex and Montana left the villa to go on their final Love Island date.
Week 7	Exits	On Day 44, after receiving the fewest public votes, Mike and Tyla were dumped from the island.; On Day 46, after receiving the fewest public votes, Georgia and Sam were dumped from the island.
Week 8
Week 8	Challenges	On Day 49, the couples took part in a number of Love Island themed challenges based on popular quotes from the series such as "100% my type on paper" and "Putting all my eggs in one basket".
Week 8	Exits	On Day 50, having received the most votes to be dumped from their fellow Islanders, Alex and Montana, Camilla and Jamie, and Gabby and Marcel were at risk of being eliminated. The decision then went down to the public, who chose not to save Alex and Montana – and therefore dumped them from the island.

== Ratings ==
Official ratings are taken from BARB and include ITV2 +1. Because the Saturday episodes are weekly catch-up episodes rather than nightly highlights, these are not included in the overall averages.

	Viewers (millions)							
	Week 1	Week 2	Week 3	Week 4	Week 5	Week 6	Week 7	Week 8
Sunday		2.08	2.21	2.41	2.76	2.83	2.84	2.88
Monday	1.94	2.04	2.18	2.44	2.65	2.85	2.89	3.06
Tuesday	1.78	2.28	2.18	2.34	2.75	2.77	3.00	
Wednesday	1.97	2.33	2.09	2.39	2.65	2.73	2.81	
Thursday	2.07	2.24	2.11	2.57	2.80	2.80	2.87	
Friday	2.03	2.13	2.21	2.73	2.92	2.74	2.84	
Weekly average	1.96	2.18	2.16	2.48	2.76	2.79	2.88	2.97
Running average	1.96	2.07	2.10	2.20	2.31	2.39	2.46	2.52
Series average	2.52							
Weekly Hotlist		—N/a	0.64	0.69	0.77	0.64	—N/a	—N/a
Aftersun		0.66	0.75	1.14	1.04	1.17	1.26	1.09

- The reunion episode that aired on 30 July 2017 had 2.12m viewers.
