= Election (TV series) =

- Genre: Reality
- Directed by: Richard Nash; Tina Gortmans
- Presented by: Angellica Bell
- Starring: Angellica Bell; Jonathan Dimbleby
- Theme music composer: Dobs Vye
- Country of origin: United Kingdom
- Original language: English
- No. of seasons: 1
- No. of episodes: 10

Production
- Executive producer: Matt Paice
- Producer: Carolyn Payne
- Production location: United Kingdom
- Camera setup: Ian Watts; Luke Sewell
- Running time: 29 minutes
- Production company: Diverse Productions

Original release
- Network: BBC One
- Release: 16 October – 18 December 2008

Related
- The Apprentice; The Speaker

Election is a British children's TV series presented by Angellica Bell and judged by Jonathan Dimbleby first broadcast in 2008 on BBC One. It was subsequently repeated on CBBC.

== Format ==
Election challenges ten contestants to take part in political challenges in two teams (Purple and Green) – similar to The Apprentice. Each week a celebrity guest mentors both teams and examines them in a skills test, where the winning team will gain an advantage for the main challenge. The winning team will go on a treat and the losing team face Jonathan Dimbleby where one will be told "Your Campaign is Over", where one will be evicted. The ten-part series culminates in the last two contestants (Hazel and Quincy) battling out at Parliament. In the end Quincy Washington from Buckinghamshire wins a personal meeting with Prime Minister Gordon Brown at 10 Downing Street. The TV series won a BAFTA Award for Entertainment.

== Episodes ==
No.	Title	Original release date (Note: Episodes aired weekly on BBC One.)	Mentor
1	"Auditions"	16 October 2008	N/A
In this first episode, 16 hopefuls enter Leadership Camp to be tested on their skills of decision making, teamwork and persuasiveness. Only ten will make it through to live in the Leadership House.
2	"Making an Impression"	23 October 2008	Michelle Dewberry
Both teams are tested on their Unique Selling Points by first-ever female winner of The Apprentice, Michelle Dewberry. The boys team (Purple) and the girls team (Green) have to host a launch party on an important cause. The green team has to bring awareness to chewing gum and the purple team has to bring awareness to the vast amount of dog poo.
3	"Recruiting People"	30 October 2008	Vince Cable
Vince Cable mentors the contestants about recruiting people to a cause. Both teams have to persuade people in Oxford Street to buy fruit in order to win an advantage for the main challenge. Both teams have to persuade IT office workers to dance. The green team persuade workers to dance the haka; the purple team persuade workers to dance the hula.
4	"Public Speaking"	6 November 2008	Dominic O'Brien
Memory champion, Dominic O'Brien mentors the new mixed teams on their memory. Both teams have to perform a professional, inventive and factual tour on the River Thames.
5	"Diplomacy"	13 November 2008	Elizabeth Brewer
The remaining seven candidates are taken to a posh restaurant in London where they have to learn the finest etiquette and manners from Ladette to Lady judge Elizabeth Brewer. One person from each team has to learn the culture, language and traditions of four countries where they have to formally discuss the culture of each country with ambassadors.
6	"Debating"	20 November 2008	Ann Widdecombe
The remaining 6 candidates are put in the hot seat by Ann Widdecombe on embarrassing questions provided by their parents. The candidates have to debate about mosquito alarms on the popular BBC NEWS show Newsnight, presented by Emily Maitlis and Jeremy Paxman.
7	"Campaigning"	27 November 2008	Ken Livingstone
The contestants have to persuade people of the public to sign petitions so that they only flush the toilet after a 'Number 2'. Ex-Mayor Ken Livingstone is the mentor for this task. "If it's yellow, let it mellow. If it's brown, flush it down." was the slogan coined by the purple team. The contestants have to do a Dragon's Den style pitch where they have to make their own fairtrade chocolate bar with ideas from the Dubble chocolate bar.
8	"Publicity Stunts"	4 December 2008	Peter Tatchell
Human rights activist, Peter Tatchell, mentors the contestants on getting attention and publicity stunts. Both teams have to persuade members of the public to give them their extra shopping bags to raise awareness of how much unnecessary plastic is being wasted. The remaining four contestants are split into boys versus girls. Each team must campaign in the heart of Oxford Street about animal rights.
9	"Inspiration"	11 December 2008	John Loughton
The final three candidates travel to Edinburgh, Scotland to be tested on their ability to get attention by Big Brother: Celebrity Hijack winner and leader of Scottish Youth Parliament John Loughton. The contestants each learn about different scientific issues and have to present a lesson in a secondary school in Edinburgh.
10	"The Final"	18 December 2008	N/A
All ten candidates reunite; the final two present their policies in front of an assembly of young people at the House of Commons in the hope of winning the title of 'Winner of Election' and the personal meeting with Prime Minister Gordon Brown.
