= Jack P. Shepherd =

British actor (born 1988)

- Born: Jack Peter Shepherd; 14 January 1988 (age 38); Pudsey, West Yorkshire, England
- Occupation: Actor
- Years active: 1997–present
- Spouse: Hanni Treweek (m. 2025)
- Partner: Lauren Shippey (2002–2017)
- Children: 4

Jack Peter Shepherd (born 14 January 1988) is an English actor. He is best known for playing David Platt on the ITV soap opera Coronation Street since 2000. For his portrayal of David, he has won various awards, including the British Soap Award for Villain of the Year in 2008 and Best Actor in 2018. In 2025, he won the twenty-fourth series of Celebrity Big Brother.

== Career ==
Before taking on the role of David, Shepherd had appeared in episodes of ITV's Where the Heart Is and BBC show Clocking Off, in which he starred with his future Coronation Street screen sister Tina O'Brien.

Shepherd has taken time out of Coronation Street to do theatre work, including the role of Riff in a production of West Side Story as part of Stage 84 The Yorkshire School of Performing Arts. He has also appeared in Oliver! at Bradford's Alhambra theatre.

In 2008, Shepherd appeared in Ghosthunting with Coronation Street on the Isle of Man.

Shepherd uses his middle initial in his stage name as there is already a well-known British actor named Jack Shepherd.

He is also a contributor to the topical show Grouchy Young Men, a spin-off of the show Grumpy Old Men, on the British version of Comedy Central.

He was the winner of the 2025 series of Celebrity Big Brother.

== Personal life ==
Shepherd was in a relationship with Lauren Shippey for fifteen years from 2002 to 2017 and the couple have two children together: a daughter, born in 2009, and a son, born in 2013.

During his relationship with Shippey, Shepherd fathered a son with Sammy Milewski following a one-night stand. He initially denied paternity of the child; however, after DNA test proved he was the father, Shepherd began paying child support for his son (born 2011), who has alternating hemiplegia of childhood (AHC).

Since 2017, Shepherd has been in a relationship with Hanni Treweek, a script writer whom he met whilst working at Coronation Street. On 23 June 2024, Treweek and Shepherd announced their engagement, having become engaged on 5 June 2024. The couple were married at Manchester Cathedral on 26 July 2025. Their first child together, a daughter, was born on 26 June 2026.

== Filmography ==
| Year | Title | Role | Notes |
|---|---|---|---|
| 1999 | Where the Heart Is | Carl Smith | Episode: "Learning the Game" |
| 2000 | Clocking Off | Charlie Kolakowski | Episode: "Yvonne's Story" |
| 2000–present | Coronation Street | David Platt | Series regular; 2,600+ episodes |
| 2010 | The Jeremy Kyle Show | David Platt | 1 episode |
| 2011, 2016–present | The Big Quiz | Team Captain | 7 episodes |
| 2025 | Celebrity Big Brother | Himself | Housemate – series 24 Winner |

=== Guest appearances ===
- This Morning (2003, 2006, 2007, 2008, 2010, 2018, 2019, 2023, 2025)
- Loose Women (2006, 2007, 2020, 2022)
- Celebrity Juice (2010, 2012, 2013, 2014)
- Xposé (2011)
- Lorraine (2011, 2016, 2019)
- All Star Mr & Mrs (2012)
- Daybreak (2012, 2013)
- Tipping Point (2013)
- The Chase (2012, 2019)
- All Star Family Fortunes (2014)
- Keep It in the Family (2015)
- You're Back in the Room (2015)
- Ant and Dec's Saturday Night Takeaway (2016)
- Good Morning Britain (2016)
- Saturday Mash-Up! (2017)

== Awards and nominations ==
| Year | Award | Category | Nominated work | Result | Refs |
|---|---|---|---|---|---|
| 2001 | Inside Soap Awards | Best Young Actor | Coronation Street | Won | |
| 2007 | Inside Soap Awards | Best Bad Boy | Coronation Street | Won | |
| 2008 | TV Quick Awards | Best Soap Actor | Coronation Street | Nominated | |
| 2008 | Inside Soap Awards | Best Bad Boy | Coronation Street | Won | |
| 2008 | The British Soap Awards | Best Actor | Coronation Street | Nominated | |
| 2008 | The British Soap Awards | Best Male Dramatic Performance | Coronation Street | Nominated | |
| 2008 | The British Soap Awards | Villain of the Year | Coronation Street | Won | |
| 2016 | The British Soap Awards | Best Actor | Coronation Street | Nominated | |
| 2016 | The British Soap Awards | Best Male Dramatic Performance | Coronation Street | Nominated | |
| 2017 | National Television Awards | Most Popular Serial Drama Performance | Coronation Street | Nominated | |
| 2018 | The British Soap Awards | Best Actor | Coronation Street | Won | |
| 2019 | The British Soap Awards | Best Male Dramatic Performance | Coronation Street | Nominated | |
| 2020 | TV Choice Awards | Best Soap Actor | Coronation Street | Won | |

| Preceded by David Potts | Celebrity Big Brother UK winner Series 24 (2025) | Succeeded by Incumbent |
