= Angellica Bell =

British television presenter

- Born: 24 March 1976 (age 50); London, England
- Education: Notting Hill & Ealing High School; University of the West of England
- Occupation: Television presenter
- Years active: 2000–present
- Employer(s): BBC, ITV, Magic
- Spouses: Stuart Amory (m. 2007; div. 2008) Michael Underwood (m. 2010)
- Children: 2
- Website: www.officialangellicabell.com

Angellica Bell (born 24 March 1976) is a British television and radio presenter, best known for her presenting on CBBC between 2000 and 2006. She is also known for providing occasional cover on The One Show and for co-presenting The Martin Lewis Money Show. Bell won the 2017 series of Celebrity MasterChef.

== Early life ==
Bell is of St. Lucian heritage. Born in 1976, Bell was raised a Mormon and educated in Ealing, West London at Notting Hill & Ealing High School. She also studied at the University of the West of England, gaining a BA Honours degree in Politics in 1996.

== Career ==
Bell began her career as a roving reporter on Channel 4's The Big Breakfast in the late 1990s. She then had a spell presenting on Carlton Kids's live afternoon programme The Max, with Paul Leyshon, before joining CBBC in May 2000 mainly working as a presenter between shows. She became the main anchor of shows, including That's Genius!, Xchange, 50/50 and Short Change. She has also presented EastEnders Xtra and Dance Xtra.

From 2004 to 2005, she presented CBBC's The Saturday Show. On 1 December 2006, Bell announced she was leaving CBBC.

She presented Holiday Hitsquad, the BBC travel programme formerly known as Departure Lounge.

Bell's break into adult-mainstream programming appeared on BBC One where she presented The Great British Village Show, with Alan Titchmarsh and James Martin, which was broadcast in the spring of 2007. In March 2007, Bell appeared on Comic Relief Does Fame Academy.

Also in 2007, she presented Dance Xtra for BBC Three and Children in Need, and was one of the reporters on The One Show.

In Autumn 2008, she hosted the CBBC show Election, and the ITV2 reality show CelebAir. In 2009, she appeared on All Star Mr & Mrs with her then-fiancé Michael Underwood.

In 2010, Bell presented the ITV programme The Zone with Michael Underwood. That same year, she also presented CBBC's Project Parent.

On 17 July 2011, she appeared as a contestant on Born to Shine. Bell learnt tap dancing but did not make it to the final. On 23 October 2011, Bell co-hosted Something for the Weekend with Tim Lovejoy standing in for Louise Redknapp.

On 1 November 2011, she was runner-up to Rav Wilding on reality series 71 Degrees North. On 21 June 2014, Bell guest-hosted an episode of Weekend Kitchen with Waitrose with Steve Jones and guest hosted on other occasions.

On 31 March 2014, 31 March 2015 and 23 November 2015, Bell was a guest co-presenter on The One Show. She also co-presented four days of shows from 26 October 2015. She regularly is asked to stand in to host the show. On 5 January 2016, Bell appeared on BBC Two in Celebrity Antiques Road Trip.

Bell stood-in for Barney Harwood on the CBBC show Blue Peter for three months. In 2016, she took part in episodes of Tipping Point: Lucky Stars and The Chase: Celebrity Special on ITV.

From 7–11 March 2016, Bell took part in a challenge for Sport Relief, called "Hell on High Seas", in which she, along with five other celebrities - Suzi Perry, Doon Mackichan, Alex Jones, Hal Cruttenden and Ore Oduba - sailed 1,000 miles from Belfast to London. Coverage of this challenge was shown on The One Show and a special programme aired called Hell on High Seas in March 2016.

In 2016, she narrated the daytime BBC series Family Finders and co-presented Ill Gotten Gains alongside Rav Wilding. She took part in the 2016 series of Tour De Celeb on Channel 5.

In September 2017, Bell won the twelfth series of BBC's Celebrity MasterChef, beating Dev Griffin and Ulrika Jonsson.

In October 2019, Bell was a panellist on BBC celebrity quiz show Richard Osman's House of Games Series 3, Week 2.

Between 2020 and 2023, Bell presented The Martin Lewis Money Show until a conflict of interest arose when she started to present Shop Smart, Save Money (2023 TV series).

In April 2025, Bell entered the Celebrity Big Brother house to appear as a housemate on the twenty-fourth series.

== Personal life ==
Bell married personal trainer Stuart Amory in January 2007. The marriage ended in July 2008.

Bell began a relationship with her former BBC co-star Michael Underwood and they married in New York in December 2010. They have two children.

== Filmography ==
Year	Title	Role	Notes
2000–2002	Xchange	Presenter	
2000–2006	CBBC	Presenter	
2000–2004	Short Change	Presenter	
2003	That's Genius!	Presenter	
2003–2004	50/50	Presenter	
2005, 2014—	EastEnders Xtra	Presenter	
2005, 2014—	Holiday Hitsquad	Co-presenter	
2007	The Great British Village Show	Co-presenter	
2007	Comic Relief Does Fame Academy	Contestant	
2007	Dance Xtra	Main presenter	
2007	Children in Need	Backstage presenter	
2007—	The One Show	Reporter/Guest presenter	
2008	CelebAir	Presenter	
2008–2009	Election	Presenter	
2009	All Star Mr & Mrs	Contestant	With Michael Underwood
2010	The British Soap Awards	Awards co-presenter	
2010	The Zone	Co-presenter	
2010	Project Parent	Presenter	
2011	Born to Shine	Contestant	
2011	71 Degrees North	Contestant	
2011	Something for the Weekend	Guest presenter	
2014	Weekend Kitchen with Waitrose	Guest presenter	1 episode
2014	A Question of Faith	Presenter	
2015	Hacker's Birthday Bash: 30 Years of Children's BBC	Herself	One-off special
2015	Police Interceptors	Presenter	Series 9, Ep 11
2016	Blue Peter	Co-presenter	1 episode
2016	Hell on High Seas	Participant	One-off TV special
2016	Ill Gotten Gains	Co-presenter	1 series
2016	Family Finders	Narrator	Series 2
2016	Tour De Celeb	Participant	
2017	Let's Sing and Dance for Comic Relief	Participant	As part of The One Show
2017	Celebrity MasterChef	Winner	Series 12
2017–2023	The Martin Lewis Money Show	Co-presenter	Series 7–12
2018	The Big Family Cooking Showdown	Co-presenter	Series 2
2019	Richard Osman's House of Games	Participant	Series 3, Week 2
2020	A Very Country Christmas	Co-presenter	With Ellie Harrison
2023	The Apprentice	Herself	Series 17. Episode 3 “Cartoons”
2023	RHS Chelsea Flower Show	Co-presenter	Episode 10
2023	Shop Smart, Save Money	Co-presenter	Alongside Ortis Deley
2023	Cutting the Cost of Christmas	Presenter	7 December 2023 episode of Tonight
2025	Celebrity Big Brother	Herself	Housemate; series 24
