= You Vs. Chris & Kem =

British game show

- Genre: Game show; Reality
- Presented by: Chris Hughes; Kem Cetinay
- Country of origin: United Kingdom
- Original language: English
- No. of seasons: 2
- No. of episodes: 9

Production
- Production location: Various
- Running time: 45 minutes
- Production companies: ITV Studios; Twenty Six 03 Entertainment

Original release
- Network: ITV2
- Release: 16 July 2018 – present

You Vs. Chris & Kem is a British game show that puts members of the public up against former Love Island contestants Chris Hughes and Kem Cetinay in a series of challenges. It has aired on ITV2 since July 2018. The series sees the loveable duo embrace their competitive spirits as they team up to take on the viewers in a series of outlandish, impulsive and no holds barred challenges that put their teamwork to the test. Traveling up and down the country in their specially designed ‘Bro Mobile’, the Love Island double act will be assigned each challenge via their social media channels, in real time. With only clues to guide them, Chris and Kem must decide whether to take on the challenge, knowing little about what exactly it will entail and who they will be competing against.

== Challenges ==
Pilot: Gravy wrestling, doughnut eating, camel racing, waxing, and water jumping.

Season 1:

Episode 1: Football tennis, quiet, naked boules, and rollercoaster spillage.

Episode 2: Hold critters, 100m race, blind pottery making, and extreme parking.

Episode 3: Horse skateboarding, dildo darts, pub quiz, and food twister.

== Transmissions ==
Series	Start date	End date	Episodes
1	16 July 2018	30 July 2018	3
2	21 February 2019	28 March 2019	6
