= Michael Condron =

Irish-Canadian actor

Michael Condron is a Canadian born actor from Northern Ireland.

== Career ==
Condron was born in Toronto, Canada, and raised in Belfast, Northern Ireland.

He has been active in several stage productions, mainly at the Lyric Theatre, Belfast. He portrayed Robert McGladdery in the BBC docu-film Last Man Hanging in 2008, and he played the role of Ricky in the BBC One series Number 2s in 2015. He appeared in minor roles in feature films such as Keith Lemon: The Film and High-Rise.

He notably portrayed Bowen Marsh in season 5 and season 6 of the HBO series Game of Thrones. As a part of the cast, he was nominated for a Screen Actors Guild Award for Outstanding Performance by an Ensemble in a Drama Series.

Condron played Ben McGregor in the TV comedy series Soft Border Patrol (2018-2020). Since 2022, he has portrayed Griff Reynolds in Coronation Street.

== Filmography ==
=== Film ===
Year	Title	Role	Notes
2008	Last Man Hanging	Robert McGladdery	TV film
2012	Keith Lemon: The Film	Hoff Film Director	
2015	High-Rise	Delivery Man	
2020	Solitary	Ken Bradley	
2021	Doineann	Aidan	
2026	No Ordinary Heist	Dink	

=== Television ===
Year	Title	Role	Notes
2004	Pulling Moves	Ambush Man	1 episode ("The Grandfather Clock")
2007	The Tudors	Sailor	1 episode ("Look to God First")
2008	Fairy Tales	Police Constable	1 episode ("Billy Goat")
2015	Number 2s	Ricky	6 episodes
2015–2016	Game of Thrones	Bowen Marsh	10 episodes
2018–2020	Soft Border Patrol	Ben McGregor	7 episodes
2022–2024	Coronation Street	Griff Reynolds	Regular role
2024	Say Nothing	Deckie	3 episodes
2024–2025	Pickle Storm	Derek	Regular role
2025	Art Detectives	DI Hollis	1 episode ("Pictures at an Exhibition")

== Theatre (selection) ==
- Mojo-Mickybo, directed by Karl Wallace (Lyric Theatre Studio, Hammersmith, 2003)
- A Very Weird Manor, directed by Ian McElhinney (Lyric Theatre, Belfast, 2005)
- Mirandolina, directed by Jonathan Munby (Royal Exchange, Manchester, 2006)
- Much Ado About Nothing, directed by Rachel O'Riordan (Lyric Theatre, Belfast, 2007)
- To Be Sure, directed by Tim Loane (Lyric Theatre, Belfast, 2007)
- Macbeth, directed by Lynne Parker (Lyric Theatre, Belfast, 2012)
- The Boat Factory, regia di Philip Crawford (59E59 Theaters, New York City, 2013)
- Lally the Scut, directed by Michael Duke (The MAC, Belfast, 2015)
- Love or Money, directed by Stephen Kelly (Lyric Theatre, Belfast, 2016)
- The 39 Steps, directed by Lisa May (Lyric Theatre, Belfast, 2016)
- Smiley, directed by Conall Morrison (Lyric Theatre, Belfast, 2016)
- Sinners, directed by Mick Gordon (Lyric Theatre, Belfast, 2017)
