= Donna Preston =

English actress and comedian (born 1986)

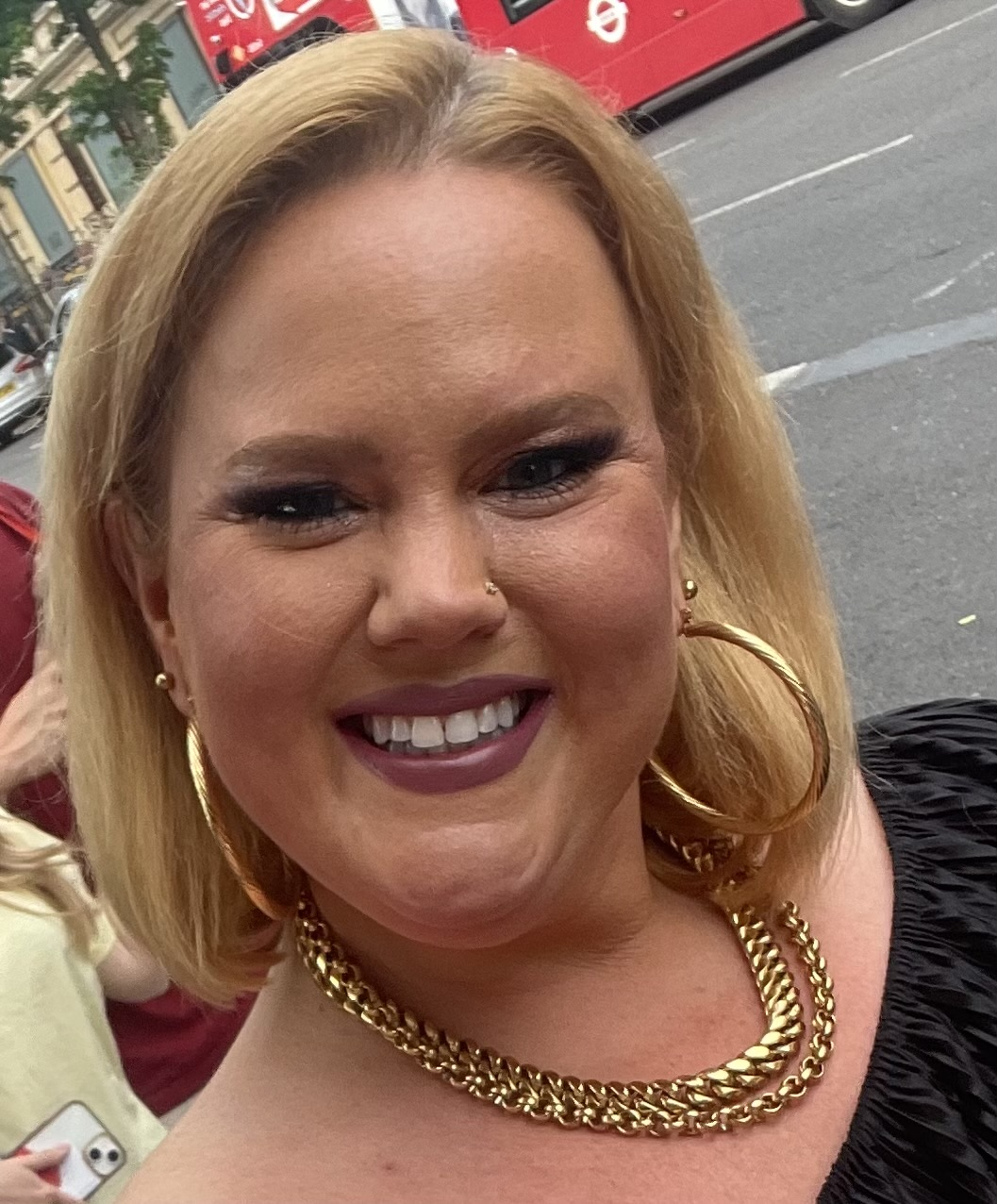
- Preston in 2025
- Born: Donna Marie Preston; 6 June 1986 (age 40); York, England
- Occupations: Actress; comedian; writer
- Years active: 2013–present

Donna Preston (born 6 June 1986) is an English actress, comedian and writer, notable for appearances in Apocalypse Wow, Hey Tracey! and Scared of the Dark. She appears as Despair in Neil Gaiman's The Sandman released on Netflix in 2022.

== Early life and education ==
Preston was born on 6 June 1986 in York, North Yorkshire and went to Fulford School in York. She attended York College and went on to train at Rose Bruford in London.

== Career ==
Preston has appeared in a number of films and television series. Film work includes Set the Thames on Fire (starring Noel Fielding), Grimsby (starring Sacha Baron Cohen), The Hitman's Bodyguard (starring Ryan Reynolds and Samuel L. Jackson) and Holmes & Watson (starring Will Ferrell and John C. Reilly). She has also regularly lent her voice to the Discovery Channel, BBC, ITV, E4, Amazon and Channel 4.

In 2018, she appeared in Coronation Street, Fantastic Beasts: The Crimes of Grindelwald, and took a lead role in Michael McIntyre's Big Show executing pranks involving improvisation on the general public.

In 2019, she appeared on Pants on Fire on E4. Preston wrote and co-produced the series Fully Blown for BBC Three's Comedy Threesomes, transmitted in 2019, which was nominated for a Broadcast Digital Award 2020. From 2019 to 2020, Preston starred as Tracey in Hey Tracey! on ITV2, alongside Joel Dommett, and appeared in episodes of The Mash Report on BBC Two. She has appeared in a number of online comedy sketches for Channel 4.

In 2020, she appeared in episodes of BBC Three's Famalam and the feature film Loves Spell. That year she was also shortlisted for the Funny Women Awards 2020, and was a guest on 8 Out of 10 Cats on Channel 4.

In 2021, she guest starred on Inside No. 9, and co-hosted ITV's Apocalypse Wow!. She appeared as herself on Sky One's Dating NoFilter, CelebAbility, and Strictly Come Dancing: It Takes Two. During the same year, she was nominated for two Channel 4 National Comedy Awards, for Outstanding Female Comedy Entertainment Performance and the Comedy Breakthrough Award.

In 2022, she appeared as Despair in The Sandman and as Pat in Catherine Tate's six-part mockumentary sitcom Hard Cell, both released on Netflix.

In 2023, she played Mrs Sandwich in Good Omens, alongside fellow The Sandman cast member Crystal Yu.

In 2024, she reprised her role as Despair in Dead Boy Detectives, and appeared in Pickle Storm a new children's comedy drama on CBBC.

In April 2025, Preston entered the Celebrity Big Brother house to appear as a housemate on the twenty-fourth series. She placed fourth behind Jojo Siwa, Danny Beard and Jack P. Shepherd.

== Filmography ==
=== Film ===
Year	Title	Role	Notes
2013	Dirtymoney	Andrea	
2013	Who Needs Enemies	Betty	
2015	Set the Thames on Fire	Pop Pop's Fan	
2015	Rough and Ready	Sarah	
2015	Act/Or	Casting Director	
2016	Grimsby	Fat Grimsby Lass	Uncredited; a.k.a. The Brothers Grimsby
2017	Guest iin London	Police Woman	
2017	The Hitman's Bodyguard	Sonia's Cell Mate	
2017	Judwaa 2	Nancy	
2018	Fantastic Beasts: The Crimes of Grindelwald	Circus Compère	Uncredited
2020	Loves Spell	Claire	
2021	The Unfathomable Mr. Jones	Mayor's Wife	
2024	Bad Tidings	Sue	

=== Television ===
Year	Title	Role	Notes
2018	Coronation Street	Den	Episode #1.9488
2019	Relationshop		
2019-2020	Hey Tracey!	Tracey	
2020	The Mash Report	Alison Person	Episode #5.4
2020	Famalam		
2021–2022	Nasty Neighbours	Various	9 episodes
2021–2022	Apocalypse Wow	The Mistress	12 episodes
2021	Inside No. 9	Bev	Episode: "Hurry Up and Wait"
2022	Hard Cell	Fat Pat	6 episodes
2022	Celebrity Karaoke Club	Herself	Contestant; series 3
2022	The Sandman	Despair	Episode: "The Doll's House"
2023	Good Omens	Mrs. Sandwich	3 episodes
2023	Big Brother: Late & Live	Herself	Celebrity Houseguest (Week 4)
2023	Brassic	Julie	Episode: "Sweet Sixteen"
2024	Dead Boy Detectives	Despair	Episode: "The Case of the Very Long Stairway"
2024	Pickle Storm	Lystra Storm	10 episodes
2025	Celebrity Big Brother	Herself	Housemate; series 24
2025	The Sandman	Despair	TBA
2025	Celebs Go Dating	Herself	Participant; series 14
