= Marcel Somerville =

British rapper, DJ and record producer (born 1986)

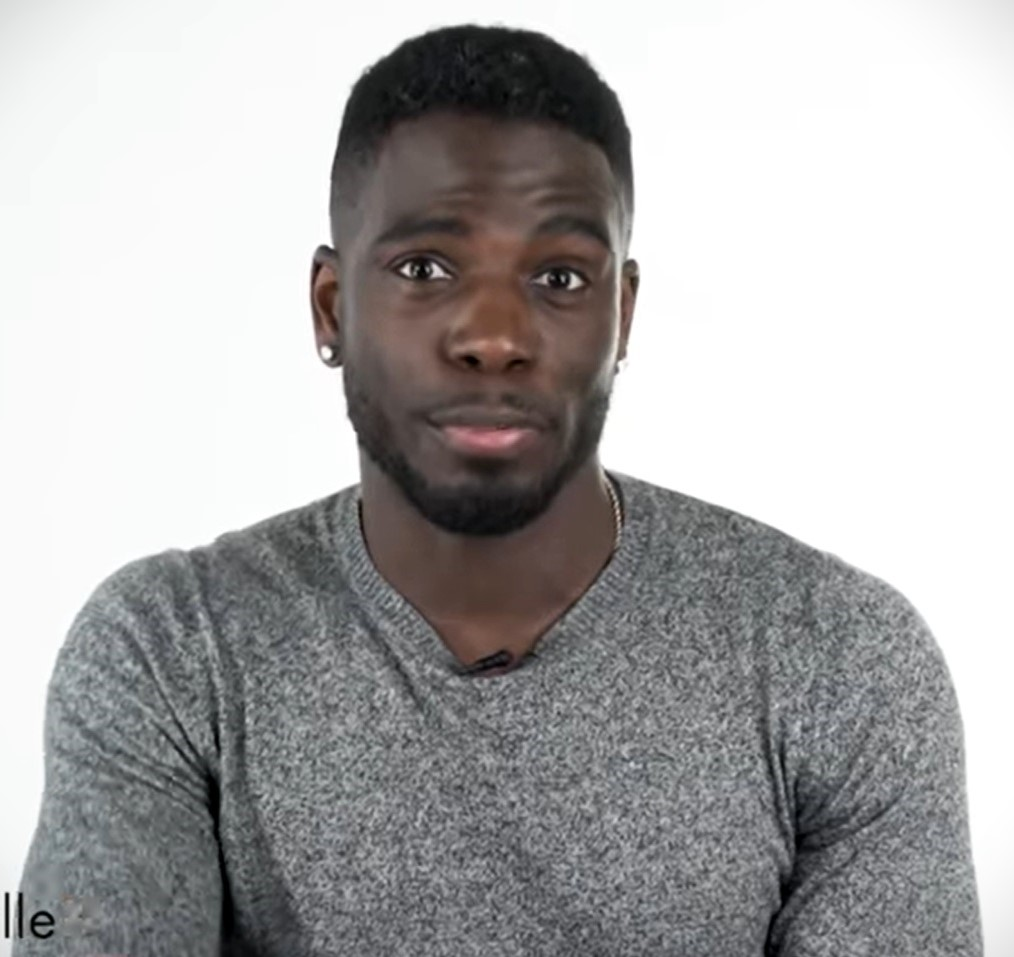
- Somerville in 2019
- Born: 7 January 1986 (age 40); London, England
- Occupation: Rapper • television personality
- Years active: 2002–present
- Spouse: Rebecca Vieira (m. 2022; div. 2024)
- Children: 1

Marcel Somerville (born 7 January 1986), also known as Rocky B, Plat'num B or Bezzle, is a British rapper, DJ, and record producer and former member of 10-piece UK hip hop group Blazin' Squad. He is the founder and producer of Dmode and has appeared in reality TV shows The Games and as a finalist on the third series of Love Island.

Following his spell on Love Island, it was announced that Somerville would release a book titled Dr Marcel's Little Book of Big Love: Your Guide to Finding Love, the Island Way.

Somerville presented numerous episodes of Trending Live! between January and February 2018 and he co-presented an episode of The Calum McSwiggan Show on Fubar Radio. Marcel also starred on Come Dine with Me in January 2020.

He presents the podcast It's Not All Dad with Jamie Jewitt and Jake Quickenden.
