= Kem Cetinay =

English television personality

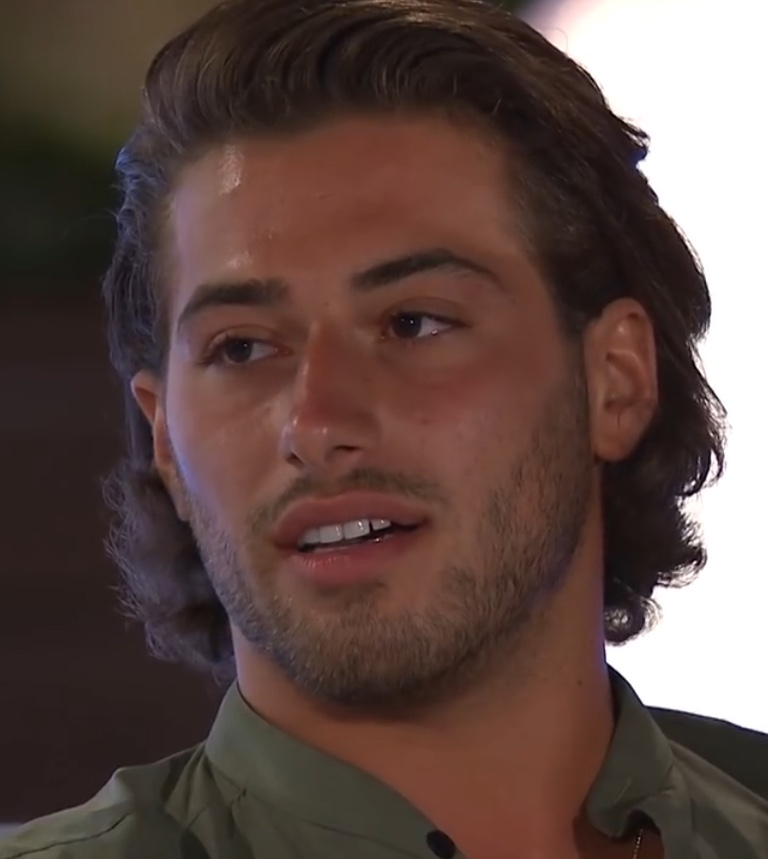
- Born: Kemal Cetinay; 25 April 1996 (age 30); Essex, England
- Occupation: Media personality
- Years active: 2017–present

Kemal Cetinay (born 25 April 1996) is an English media personality. He currently hosts The Capital Weekender on Capital and appeared on the ITV2 reality series Love Island, winning the show's third series in 2017.

== Early life ==
Kemal Cetinay was born on 25 April 1996 in Essex, the son of fashion lecturer Figen and pharmaceutical engineer Niyazi Cetinay. His parents are Turkish-Cypriot immigrants, with his mother hailing from Famagusta and his father being a native of Kyrenia. He has a brother named Izzy, who works in finance.

== Career ==
Cetinay began his career in the third series of the ITV2 reality series Love Island. He won the 2017 series and hosted the official Love Island: The Morning After podcast with Arielle Free from 2018 until 2022. During his time in the Love Island villa, Cetinay developed a bromance with fellow Islander Chris Hughes and the pair have starred in multiple formats together, including the ITV2 spin off show Straight Outta Love Island and Channel 4's Celebrity Hunted for Stand Up to Cancer plus two series of ITV2's challenge based entertainment game show You Vs. Chris & Kem.

Cetinay works with ITV's This Morning as their entertainment presenter and after appearing on ITV1's Dancing on Ice in 2018, he became their backstage presenter throughout the 2019 and 2020 series.

In October 2017, he and Hughes released a grime single "Little Bit Leave It" under the name Chris & Kem, which reached number 15 on the UK Singles Chart.

Ahead of the fourth series in 2018, it was revealed that Cetinay would be returning alongside Arielle Free to present Love Island: The Morning After, a new daily podcast show delivering the freshest gossip to fans.

In January 2018, Cetinay became a contestant on the 10th series of reality TV show, Dancing on Ice. He and his partner Alex Murphy finished in 4th place. In 2019, he returned to the show as the digital host. He has since gone on to be a guest on several television series, including Love Island: Aftersun, I'm a Celebrity: Extra Camp and Happy Hour with Olly Murs, a one-off special.

In June 2019, Cetinay played in the annual Soccer Aid match which was held at Stamford Bridge. With seven minutes remaining Cetinay scored the Rest of the World's second goal and after the match ended 2–2 he scored his team's third and final penalty in the shoot out, which the Rest of the World won 3–1. He followed this by scoring the winning penalty in 2020; two goals in 2021; a goal and a penalty in another victorious shoot out in 2022; and a goal in 2023. He is the top scorer in Soccer Aid matches with five goals.

Cetinay is the co-founder of the restaurant Array in East London.

In 2023, Cetinay joined Capital, as a guest presenter, generally covering shows on bank holidays. In July 2024, he was announced as the new host of The Capital Weekender on the Capital Network. He presents the show on Friday & Saturday evenings between 7pm and 10pm.

== Personal life ==
During 2017, Cetinay dated fellow Love Island contestant, Amber Davies, splitting in December 2017.

In August 2022, Cetinay was involved in a car crash with 28-year-old Tommy Griggs in Hornchurch, after which Griggs was pronounced dead at the scene; a coroner's inquest found that there was "absolutely nothing" Cetinay could have done to stop the accident.

== Filmography ==
Television
Year	Title	Role	Notes
2017	Love Island	Contestant	Winner series 3
2017	Good Morning Britain	Guest Entertainment Editor	
2017	Chris & Kem: Straight Outta Love Island	Co-presenter	2 episodes
2017	The Weakest Link	Contestant	Children In Need Celebrity Special
2018	Dancing on Ice	Contestant	Finished in 4th place
2018	Celebrity Hunted	Participant	Finished in 3rd place
2018–2019	You Vs. Chris & Kem	Co-presenter	6 episodes
2018–2019	Kem Cuts	Presenter	Web series
2019–2020	Dancing on Ice	Backstage host	Series 11–12
2019–present	This Morning	Showbiz presenter	Regular role
2019–present	Soccer Aid	Participant	Annually
2021	Celebrity MasterChef	Contestant	Finished in 5th place
2021	The Full Treatment	Co-presenter	

Podcast
Year	Title	Role	Note
2018–2022	Love Island: The Morning After	Co-presenter	

Radio
Year	Title	Role	Slot	Station	Notes
2019	Kem Monday	Presenter	19:00–21:00 Monday	Kiss	Guest presenter
2023–2024	Kem Cetinay	Presenter	16:00–19:00 Monday	Capital	Guest presenter
2024–present	The Capital Weekender	Presenter	19:00–22:00 Friday & Saturday	Capital	

=== Guest appearances ===
- Celebrity Juice (2017)
- I'm a Celebrity: Extra Camp (2017, 2018)
- How to Spend It Well at Christmas with Phillip Schofield (2017)
- Loose Women (2017, 2018)
- Lorraine (2018, 2019, 2021)
- Love Island: Aftersun (2018, 2019)
- Hey Tracey (2019)
- Pants on Fire (2019)
- Home Alone with Joel Dommett (2020)

== Discography ==
=== Singles ===
==== As Chris & Kem ====
Title	Year	Peak chart positions	Album
Title	Year	UK	Album
"Little Bit Leave It"	2017	15	Non-album single
