= Pickle Storm =

British television series

- Genre: Sitcom
- Created by: Dan Gaster; Will Ing; Paul Powell
- Directed by: Dez McCarthy; Louise Ní Fhiannachta; Eoin Cleland
- Starring: Kassidi Roberts; Donna Preston; Inel Tomlinson; Cadence Williams; Philip Green; Rachel Murray; Mitra Djalili; Michael Condron; Toby Barnett-Jones; Chris Barlow; Justin Fletcher
- Country of origin: Britain
- Original language: English
- No. of seasons: 2
- No. of episodes: 20

Production
- Producer: Raymond Lau
- Production company: Black Dog Television

Original release
- Network: CBBC
- Release: 9 September 2024 – 2 December 2025

Pickle Storm is a British children's sitcom created by Dan Gaster, Will Ing, and Paul Powell for CBBC. Produced by Black Dog Television, it premiered on 9 September 2024. The series centers on the eponymous Pickle Storm, a 9-year-old girl who fled Kleftania, her magic-filled fantasy home world, to seek refuge in the fictitious town of Middlington in the United Kingdom.

The series is filmed in Northern Ireland. A second series was broadcast in 2025.

== Premise ==
The series is a 'fish out of water' comedy that places an apparently alien family into suburban British school and neighbourhood life with humour and plotlines revolving around the culture clash between Kleftanian and Earth customs.

== Cast ==
- Kassidi Roberts as Pickle
- Donna Preston as Lystra
- Inel Tomlinson as Hendrick
- Cadence Williams as Mia
- Philip Green as Mr Ludcomb
- Rachel Murray as Mrs Patterson
- Mitra Djalili as Yasmin
- Michael Condron as Derek
- Toby Barnett-Jones as Roland
- Chris Barlow as Swumpy (puppeteer) Justin Fletcher voices Swumpy the Warthoffle (Voice)

== Episodes ==
=== Season 1 (2024) ===
| No. in season | Title | Directed by | Written by | Original release date | United Kingdom viewers (millions) |
|---|---|---|---|---|---|
| 1 | "Welcome to Ee'arth" | Dez McCarthy | Will Ing | September 9, 2024 | N/A |
Pickle Storm and her parents flee the magical land of Kleftania and end up on Earth, where everything is strange and confusing.
| 2 | "What's School" | Louise Ni Fhiannachta | Will Ing | September 10, 2024 | N/A |
Pickle faces her first day at school. Despite Mia’s help, Pickle struggles to fit in, and soon her magic is causing chaos and a monster is loose in the classroom!
| 3 | "Mouse" | Dez McCarthy | Will Ing | September 11, 2024 | N/A |
When Miss Hill’s pet mouse escapes and the head teacher shrinks to the size of a mouse, Roland makes sure Pickle is blamed. Can Pickle find him before the mouse does?!
| 4 | "Level Whoops" | Eoin Cleland | Tasha Dhanraj | September 12, 2024 | N/A |
When Pickle and Mia argue over what to play, Pickle’s magic causes the video game characters to come to life. Pickle and Mia must work together to get the characters back onscreen!
| 5 | "Swapperooni" | Louise Ni Fhiannachta | Dan Gaster | September 13, 2024 | N/A |
After being told off by Mr Ludcomb, Pickle's magic causes them to swap bodies. With Pickle looking like the head teacher, she is free to run the school – but her new rules cause chaos.
| 6 | "Babysitting" | Dez McCarthy | Paul Powell | September 16, 2024 | N/A |
Pickle’s parents go to their first Earth party, leaving Mia’s annoying sister Tina to babysit her. However, nothing is keeping Pickle from joining the fun.
| 7 | "The Great Sale Fail" | Dez McCarthy | Tasha Dhanraj | September 17, 2024 | N/A |
At the school table sale. Lystra decides to sell her old shields, Hendrick rides a bicycle, and Pickle wants to buy something amazing.
| 8 | "Mother's Day" | Eoin Cleland | Hannah George | September 18, 2024 | N/A |
For Mother’s Day, Pickle decides to get Lystra some flowers. Unfortunately, she helps herself to next door’s prizewinning sunflowers.
| 9 | "Dog Show" | Louise Ni Fhiannachta | Lucy Guy | September 19, 2024 | N/A |
Pickle enters the local dog show with her pet, Swumpy the warthoffle. When Roland cheats, Pickle’s magic makes Mr Ludcomb behave like a dog. In the chaos, someone steals the trophy.
| 10 | "Hairy Egg" | Louise Ni Fhiannachta | Paul Powell | September 20, 2024 | N/A |
The Hairy Egg is ready to hatch and Pickle is keeping it safe. There is widespread panic when it disappears and Pickle's parents forget who they are.

=== Season 2 (2025) ===
| No. in season | Title | Directed by | Written by | Original release date | United Kingdom viewers (millions) |
|---|---|---|---|---|---|
| 1 | "School is Rubbish" | Cein Mcgillicuddy | Hannah George | April 28, 2025 | N/A |
Mr Ludcomb is trying to win the Best Headteacher Award, but when Pickle’s magic accidentally turns the school rubbish bins into monsters, his plans go awry.
| 2 | "House Trap" | Cein Mcgillicuddy | Tasha Dhanraj | April 29, 2025 | N/A |
Lystra and Hendrick have their first experience of a school parents’ evening, while Pickle, Mia and Roland get trapped in Pickle’s house, and find themselves playing the floor is lava - for real.
| 3 | "Valentine's Day" | Louise Ni Fhiannachta | Lucy Guy | April 30, 2025 | N/A |
Pickle’s magic causes Mr Ludcomb to fall in love with Miss Hill, and his efforts to woo her escalate.
| 4 | "Worst Sports Day Ever" | Cein Mcgillicuddy | Dan Gaster | May 1, 2025 | N/A |
Pickle gets competitive at school's sports day, but she's paired with Roland and he doesn't want to take part.
| 5 | "Swumpy the Genius" | Louise Ni Fhiannachta | Will Ing | May 2, 2025 | N/A |
Swumpy gets into the school, and another magical accident makes him super clever. Swumpy helps Pickle come first in a test but the glory backfires when she has to compete in a maths competition.
| 6 | "Pickle’s Birthday" | Louise Ni Fhiannachta | Lucy Guy | May 3, 2025 | N/A |
Pickle accidentally opens a magical portal to Kleftania, causing evil Lord Clunkett to arrive on Earth seeking revenge.: Note: Pickle turns 10 in this episode.
| 7 | "The Slide" | Louise Ni Fhiannachta and Sarah Gordon | Sarah Gordon | May 6, 2025 | N/A |
A brand new slide at school brings excitement, but things get complicated when a magical mishap causes Mia and Mr Ludcomb’s hair to grow uncontrollably.
| 8 | "Double Trouble" | Cein Mcgillicuddy | Will Ing | May 7, 2025 | N/A |
Pickle is keen to become school ambassador. An accidental clone of herself inspires a plan, but the two Pickles don't get on.
| 9 | "Splatoween" | Eoin Cleland | Paul Powell | October 1, 2025 | N/A |
Halloween special. Pickle and Mia want to win the school fancy dress competition, but Pickle’s magic accidentally summons two mischievous ghosts.
| 10 | "A Very Stormy Christmas" | Louise Ni Fhiannachta | Tasha Dhanraj and Hannah George | December 2, 2025 | N/A |
Pickle’s magic turns Mr Ludcomb into an evil pixie who starts stealing all the Christmas presents. Then Pickle has to get back all the presents and save Christmas.
