= Solitary (2020 film) =

2020 film by Luke Armstrong

- Film poster
- Directed by: Luke Armstrong
- Written by: Luke Armstrong
- Produced by: Luke Armstrong; Sarah-Anne Grill; Johnny Sachon
- Starring: Johnny Sachon; Lottie Tolhurst
- Cinematography: Jack Booth
- Music by: Vince Cox
- Production company: Inspired Pictures
- Distributed by: High Fliers Films
- Release date: 31 August 2020
- Country: United Kingdom
- Language: English

Solitary is a 2020 British sci-fi thriller film written, directed, and produced by Luke Armstrong.

== Cast ==
- Johnny Sachon as Issac
- Lottie Tolhurst as Alana Skill
- Michael Condron as Ken Bradley
- Brian Bovell as Harry
- Ben Valentine as Pundit Chris
- Lydia Cherry as Clara
