= That's Genius! =

- That's Genius! Logo
- Presented by: Angellica Bell; Steve Wilson; Kursty Groves
- Country of origin: United Kingdom
- No. of episodes: 6

Production
- Producer: Andra Heritage
- Running time: 24 Minutes

Original release
- Network: BBC One
- Release: 12 November – 17 December 2003

That's Genius! was a BBC children's television series originally shown on BBC One between 12 November 2003 and 17 December 2003. The program ran for one series. Earlier in 2003 CBBC announced a competition for children to send in their ideas for inventions. The competition attracted nearly 3000 entries of which a panel of judges chose the top five. These five inventions were then made into prototypes by experts. On 17 December 2003 viewers were invited to vote for their favourite invention and then the winner was announced live on BBC One. The winner won a behind-the-scenes tour at the Epcot Center. The show was presented by Angellica Bell, Kursty Groves and Steve Wilson.

== Episode Format ==
Each episode, except from the final, included one invention which was made in front of the inventor. There was also an activity, related to that episodes invention, for viewers to do at home. Each episode was made up of studio filmed footage and location filmed footage.

Kursty Groves, inventor of the Techno Bra and innovation consultant, co-presented the series with Angellica and Steve.

== Finalists ==
In total there were five finalists whose ideas were made. They were:

- Gavin Calder – Power Lilo, A lilo with a solar powered propeller
- Joseph O'Neill – Choc Attack Cubicle, An arcade game which uses floor sensors to control the game
- Sophia Dollery – Hologram Radio, A projector with a projector screen, designed for music videos
- Robert Newcombe – Spy Bird (Spybird), A remote-controlled plane disguised as a bird with a built-in digital camera
- Charlie Watts – Laser Speed, A device to be placed in cars which lets the car know if it is speeding

== The Final ==
The final took place on 17 December 2003. The winner was decided by a phone-in vote and the result was announced live from the CBBC studio. The winner was Sophia Dollery and the Hologram Radio.
