= Chris & Kem =

British musical duo

- Genres: Pop-rap
- Years active: 2017
- Past members: Chris Hughes; Kem Cetinay

Chris & Kem were a British musical duo who charted at number fifteen on the UK Singles Chart in 2017 with their song "Little Bit Leave It". They were composed of friends Kem Cetinay and Chris Hughes, who met on the third series of Love Island in 2017.

== Discography ==
=== Single ===
Title	Year	Peak chart positions	Album
Title	Year	UK	Album
"Little Bit Leave It"	2017	15	Non-album single
