= Celebrity Big Brother (British TV series) series 23 =

Celebrity Big Brother
- Series 23
- Series twenty-three logo
- Hosted by: AJ Odudu; Will Best
- No. of days: 18
- No. of housemates: 13
- Winner: David Potts
- Runner-up: Nikita Kuzmin
- Companion show: Celebrity Big Brother: Late & Live
- No. of episodes: 17

Release
- Original network: ITV
- Original release: 4 March – 22 March 2024

Series chronology
- ← Previous; Series 22 Next → Series 24

Celebrity Big Brother 2024, also known as Celebrity Big Brother 23, is the twenty-third series of Celebrity Big Brother. It is the first celebrity series and second series of Big Brother overall to air on ITV after ITV plc gained the rights to the format. The series began on 4 March 2024, almost six years since it last aired on Channel 5. It was co-presented by AJ Odudu and Will Best.

The series featured Sharon Osbourne as the first ever "Celebrity Lodger". On 22 March 2024, David Potts was announced as the winner of the series, with Nikita Kuzmin finishing as the runner-up.

With a series average of 2.51m, this series of Celebrity Big Brother had the highest viewership since the seventeenth series in 2016.

== Format ==
Celebrity Big Brother is a game show in which a group of celebrity contestants, referred to as housemates, live in isolation from the outside world in a custom built "house", constantly under video surveillance. During their time in the House, the housemates are required to nominate two of their fellow contestants for potential eviction, and the two or more with the most votes would be nominated. This process is mandatory for all housemates, and failure to comply could result in expulsion from the House. The public then vote, with one of those celebrities evicted from the house. When the final week arrives, the viewers vote for which of the remaining celebrities should win the series, and the housemate with the most votes becomes the winner.

During their time in the House, housemates are given weekly tasks to perform. The housemates wager a portion of their weekly shopping budget on the task, and either win double their wagered fund or lose the wagered fund depending on their performance in the task. The housemates are required to work as a group to complete their tasks, with the format of the tasks varying based on the number of remaining housemates. Throughout the series, some housemates have been given secret tasks that must either be completed individually or with a small group; failure to do so can result in the housemate being nominated or punished in the House. Should the housemates run out of the food provided for them, an emergency ration was available to them. The housemates are forbidden from discussing nominations, and doing so could result in punishment. The format of the series is mainly seen as a social experiment, and requires housemates to interact with others who may have differing ideals, beliefs, and prejudices. Housemates are also required to make visits to the Diary Room during their stay in the House, where they are able to share their thoughts and feelings on their fellow housemates and the game.

== Housemates ==
On Day 1, twelve housemates entered the house during the launch show. Sharon Osbourne entered the house as a "Celebrity Lodger".

Celebrity	Age on entry	Notability	Day entered	Day exited	Result	Ref.
David Potts	30	Reality TV star	1	19	Winner	
Nikita Kuzmin	26	Strictly Come Dancing professional	1	19	Runner-up	
Colson Smith	25	Coronation Street actor	1	19	3rd place	
Louis Walsh	71	Music manager and TV personality	1	19	4th place	
Fern Britton	66	TV presenter and author	1	19	5th place	
Bradley Riches	22	Actor	1	17	Evicted	
Zeze Millz	34	Social media personality and TV presenter	1	16	Evicted	
Marisha Wallace	38	Actress and singer	1	16	Evicted	
Ekin-Su Cülcüloğlu	29	Love Island winner and actress	1	12	Evicted	
Levi Roots	65	Musician and businessman	1	12	Evicted	
Lauren Simon	51	Reality TV star	1	9	Evicted	
Gary Goldsmith	58	Uncle of Catherine, Princess of Wales	1	5	Evicted	

=== Bradley Riches ===
Bradley Riches is an English actor, known for portraying the role of James McEwan in the Netflix teen series Heartstopper since 2022. He has also appeared in various stage productions including Footloose, Monstersongs, and Disaster!. He entered the house on Day 1. He became the seventh housemate to be evicted on Day 17, in a back-door eviction.

=== Colson Smith ===
Colson Smith is an English actor, who is best known for portraying the role of Craig Tinker on the ITV soap opera Coronation Street since 2011. He also competed on the ITV reality series The Games in 2022. He entered the house on Day 1. He left the house on Day 19, finishing in third place.

=== David Potts ===
David Potts is an English television personality, who is best known for appearing as head rep on the ITV2 reality series Ibiza Weekender and its successor Kavos Weekender from 2016 to 2023. He has also appeared on various other shows including Celebs Go Dating, Celebs on the Farm, Celebrity Karaoke Club and Celebrity Ghost Trip. He entered the house on Day 1. He won the show on Day 19, leaving the house in first place.

=== Ekin-Su Cülcüloğlu ===
Ekin-Su Cülcüloğlu is a British-Turkish actress, model, and television personality. She portrayed the role of Isil in the Turkish soap opera Kuzey Yıldızı İlk Aşk, before going on to win the eighth series of Love Island in 2022. She subsequently appeared on the fifteenth series of Dancing on Ice and the second season of The Traitors US. She entered the house on Day 1. She became the fourth housemate to be evicted on Day 12, in a double eviction.

=== Fern Britton ===
Fern Britton is an English television presenter and author. After co-presenting shows such as Breakfast Time and Ready Steady Cook, she went on to co-present ITV's This Morning between 1999 and 2009. She also co-presented All Star Mr & Mrs and went on to front her own talk shows, Fern Britton Meets... and Fern. She has also participated in Strictly Come Dancing and has gone on to publish various novels and books consisting of short stories and non-fiction. She entered the house on Day 1. She left the house on Day 19, in fifth place.

=== Gary Goldsmith ===
Gary Goldsmith is an English businessman and entrepreneur who is the maternal uncle of Catherine, Princess of Wales. Regarded as the "black sheep" of the family, Goldsmith is a self-made millionaire as a result of his IT recruitment companies. He entered the house on Day 1. He became the first housemate to be evicted on Day 5.

=== Lauren Simon ===
Lauren Simon is an English television personality, known for appearing as a cast member on the ITVBe reality television series The Real Housewives of Cheshire since 2015. She has also appeared on Release the Hounds, CelebAbility, Celebrity Dinner Date and First Dates. She entered the house on Day 1. She became the second housemate to be evicted on Day 9.

=== Levi Roots ===
Levi Roots is a British-Jamaican reggae musician, television personality, celebrity chef, author and businessman. Roots has performed with James Brown and Maxi Priest and was nominated for a Best Reggae Act MOBO award in 1998. He gained further notability after appearing on Dragons' Den in 2007, where he gained £50,000 funding for his Reggae Reggae Sauce. He entered the house on Day 1. He became the third housemate to be evicted on Day 12, in a double eviction.

=== Louis Walsh ===
Louis Walsh is an Irish music manager and television personality. Throughout his career, he has managed bands such as Boyzone, Westlife and Girls Aloud. He has also served as a talent show judge on television shows such as Popstars, You're a Star, Ireland's Got Talent and most notably The X Factor. He entered the house on Day 1. He left the house on Day 19, in fourth place.

=== Marisha Wallace ===
Marisha Wallace is an American actress and singer, who is known for her work in musical theatre. She has appeared in the West End production of Dreamgirls, as well as Waitress and Hairspray. She garnered an Olivier Award nomination for Best Actress in a Supporting Role in a Musical for her portrayal of Ado Annie in Oklahoma!, and whilst in the house received another for Best Actress in a Musical for her role as Adelaide in Guys and Dolls. She also released albums titled Soul Holiday and Tomorrow. She entered the house on Day 1. She became the fifth housemate to be evicted on Day 16, in a double eviction.

=== Nikita Kuzmin ===
Nikita Kuzmin is a Ukrainian-Italian dancer and choreographer. He appeared as a professional dancer on the RTL series Let's Dance in 2020, before becoming a professional on the British version Strictly Come Dancing the following year. Kuzmin is also the holder of six Italian Championship titles. He entered the house on Day 1. He left the house on Day 19, as the runner-up.

=== Zeze Millz ===
Zeze Millz is an English social media personality and television presenter. She fronted her own YouTube series The Zeze Millz Show in which she interviewed a variety of guests most notably members of the Black British music industry. She has also co-presented the Channel 4 chat show Unapologetic and appeared on Celeb Cooking School. She entered the house on Day 1. She became the sixth housemate to be evicted on Day 16, in a double eviction.

== House guests ==
=== Sharon Osbourne ===
Sharon Osbourne is a British-American television personality, music manager, and author. She was married to the late heavy metal singer Ozzy Osbourne and came to prominence while appearing on the families' reality television show The Osbournes, before becoming a judge on the television talent competition shows The X Factor and America's Got Talent. She entered the house on Day 1 as the first ever "Celebrity Lodger". Following her entrance, she had to decide which three housemates made the worst first impressions before choosing one housemate to face the first eviction of the series. She ultimately chose Gary. On Day 7, she got to secretly watch the housemates' nominations, before having to save one of the nominated housemates from eviction, and replace them with another. She chose to save Zeze, and nominated Fern in her place. She left the house on Day 9.

== Nominations table ==
	Day 3	Day 7	Day 10	Day 14	Day 19 Final		Nominations received
Main Housemates
David	Louis, Levi	Lauren, Levi	Levi, Louis	Marisha, Fern	Winner (Day 19)		8
Nikita	Fern, Lauren	Lauren, Fern	Louis, Fern	Fern, Zeze	Runner-up (Day 19)		1
Colson	Lauren, Ekin-Su	Lauren, Louis	Louis, Levi	Marisha, Fern	Third place (Day 19)		3
Louis	Bradley, Zeze	Zeze, Fern	Zeze, David	Bradley, Zeze	Fourth place (Day 19)		14
Fern	Levi, Ekin-Su	Ekin-Su, Lauren	Louis, Ekin-Su	Marisha, Colson	Fifth place (Day 19)		10
Bradley	Louis, Lauren	Louis, Lauren	Louis, Ekin-Su	Marisha, Zeze	Evicted (Day 17)		3
Zeze	Ekin-Su, Lauren	Lauren, Louis	Louis, Ekin-Su	Colson, Bradley	Evicted (Day 16)		13
Marisha	Lauren, David	Lauren, Louis	Louis, Ekin-Su	Fern, David	Evicted (Day 16)		4
Ekin-Su	Zeze, Fern	David, Zeze	Louis, Fern	Evicted (Day 12)			8
Levi	Zeze, David	Zeze, Lauren	Colson, David	Evicted (Day 12)			5
Lauren	Zeze, David	Zeze, David	Evicted (Day 9)				14
Gary	Lauren, Zeze	Evicted (Day 5)					1
Celebrity Lodger
Sharon	~~David,~~; Gary, ~~Zeze~~	Zeze (to save); Fern (to nominate)	Left (Day 9)				N/A
Notes	1	2	3	4, 5	6		
Against public vote	Gary, Lauren	Fern, Lauren, Louis, ~~Zeze~~	David, Ekin-Su, Fern, Levi, Louis	Fern, Marisha, Nikita, Zeze	Bradley, Colson, David, Fern, Louis, Nikita		
Evicted	Gary; Fewest votes to save	Lauren; Fewest votes to save	Levi; Fewest votes to save	Marisha; Fewest votes to save	Bradley; 1.61% (out of 6)	Colson; 18.63% (out of 3)	
Evicted	Gary; Fewest votes to save	Lauren; Fewest votes to save	Levi; Fewest votes to save	Marisha; Fewest votes to save	Fern; 6.03% (out of 5)	Nikita; 29.76% (out of 2)	
Evicted	Gary; Fewest votes to save	Lauren; Fewest votes to save	Ekin-Su; Fewest votes to save	Zeze; Fewest votes to save	Louis; 10.07% (out of 4)	Nikita; 29.76% (out of 2)	
Evicted	Gary; Fewest votes to save	Lauren; Fewest votes to save	Ekin-Su; Fewest votes to save	Zeze; Fewest votes to save	David; 33.89% to win		

Notes

- ^Note 1: On Day 1, Sharon entered the house as a "Celebrity Lodger". Following her entrance, she had to place three housemates in the "Danger Zone" based on first impressions, before ultimately choosing one of them to nominate for eviction. She chose David, Gary and Zeze. On Day 2, she nominated Gary.
- ^Note 2: On Day 7, Lauren, Louis and Zeze were nominated for eviction, however celebrity lodger Sharon had the power to save one of them, but in doing so had to name a replacement nominee. She chose Fern.
- ^Note 3: Housemates nominated in a face-to-face vote.
- ^Note 4: Prior to nominations, during the final part of the shopping task on Day 13, housemates had to collectively decide which of them would receive a "killer nomination" and therefore automatically face the public vote. They chose Nikita.
- ^Note 5: On Day 14, as the first housemate to enter the diary room when instructed by Big Brother, Fern discovered a pot of gold and a snake, and was told that she had the power to evict one housemate by placing the snake on their pillow. However, unbeknownst to Fern, the housemate she chose was instead awarded immunity from nominations. She chose Louis, who was ultimately granted immunity.
- ^Note 6: On Day 16, the voting lines opened for the public to vote for the winner. On Day 17, voting was frozen, and the housemate with the fewest votes, Bradley, was evicted via the back door. The voting percentages reflect the overall share of the vote when the lines closed for good, and do not account for the regular voting freezes that took place during the final. David won with 53.24% of the vote to win over Nikita's 46.76%.

== Summary ==
The main events in the Celebrity Big Brother 23 house are summarised in the table below.

Day 1	Entrances	Sharon entered the house as a "Celebrity Lodger".; Louis, Nikita, Ekin-Su, Colson, Gary, Marisha, David, Levi, Zeze, Lauren, Bradley and Fern entered the house.
Day 1	Twists	After entering the house, Sharon was told by Big Brother that she would be observing the housemates throughout the evening before deciding who to place in the "Danger Zone" based on first impressions, ultimately leaving them at risk of facing eviction. Louis was enlisted to help Sharon make her decision and she subsequently chose David, Gary and Zeze.
Day 2	Nominations	After being placed in the "Danger Zone", David, Gary and Zeze each had to plead their case to celebrity lodger Sharon, who had to decide which housemate to face the first eviction of the series. She chose Gary, who ultimately faced the public vote.
Day 2	Tasks	For "BB Races", housemates were separated into four teams, each of which consisted of an "owner", a "jockey" and a "horse", whilst celebrity lodger Sharon served as the "race steward". The teams were as follows; Lauren, Levi and Nikita; Colson, Fern and David; Gary, Marisha and Ekin-Su; and Bradley, Louis and Zeze. The winners of the race would ultimately win a party for that evening. Lauren, Levi and Nikita won, and each got to choose another housemate to join them at the party. They chose Louis, Ekin-Su and David respectively. Sharon, as "race steward" was able to attend the party also.
Day 3	Nominations	Housemates nominated for the first time. Lauren received the most nominations and therefore faced the public vote alongside Gary.
Day 4	Tasks	The house was transformed into Big Brother's Celestial Retreat. Levi was appointed as the "guiding eye" by his fellow housemates. Housemates had to take perform a "spiritually cleansing dance" before taking part in a healing circle in which each housemate had to choose a flower petal from the bowl, read out a question and choose another housemate to answer it. At the end of the healing circle, guiding eye Levi had to choose which two housemates he felt came closest to enlightenment. He chose Bradley and Gary respectively.
Day 4	Punishments	As punishment for discussing nominations, Lauren and Louis were sent to the "Celebrity Wheelie Bin of Shame" in the garden, and had to remain there until further notice whilst writing a letter of apology to their fellow housemates.
Day 5	Exits	Gary became the first housemate to be evicted, after receiving the fewest votes to save.
Day 6	Tasks	For this week's shopping task, housemates had to run "Big Brother's Police Department". Lauren was appointed captain, whilst Marisha was given the role of deputy. Housemates had to investigate the crime scene of a dead clown and gather evidence. However David was given a secret mission to sabotage the shopping task, and had to recruit another housemate to join him. He chose Zeze. Together they were "Bad Cops" and had to undertake several instructions by Big Brother in order to pass the task, including stealing the clown's body and fingers from the evidence cage and taking them to the secret diner. David also had to distract Bradley whilst they were on lookout for sightings of "Top Hat Tommy". At the end of the task, captain Lauren had to choose which two housemates she thought were the "Bad Cops"; she chose Bradley and Fern, who were subsequently sent to jail. As David and Zeze remained undetected, housemates passed the shopping task and received a luxury shopping budget.
Day 7	Nominations	Housemates nominated for the second time. Lauren, Louis and Zeze received the most nominations.
Day 7	Twists	As a celebrity lodger, Sharon was able to watch each of the housemates' nominations live, from her secret bedroom. After the housemates had finished nominating, Sharon was asked by Big Brother to save a nominated housemate from eviction, but in doing so, she had to choose another housemate to take their place. She chose to save Zeze from eviction, and put Fern up in her place; who ultimately faced the public vote alongside Lauren and Louis.
Day 8	Tasks	Housemates took part in Big Brother's talent show "You're Gonna Be a Star", in which Louis, Marisha, Nikita and "celebrity lodger" Sharon served as judges, whilst the remaining housemates were separated into two groups; a girl band and a boy band named the Flavour Ladies and Sexy Slayers respectively. Each group had to undertake vocal coaching with Marisha and had to learn choreography with Nikita, before performing in front of the judges who ultimately had to decide which group were the winners. They chose the Sexy Slayers.
Day 9	Tasks	Housemates took part in a game of "Jelly Bean Roulette" in which they had to pick a jelly bean from the bowl, and if it was sweet; they had to ask another housemate a positive question, however if it was sour; they had to ask a negative question.
Day 9	Exits	Lauren became the second housemate to be evicted, after receiving the fewest votes to save.; Sharon left the house, following her stay as a "Celebrity Lodger".
Day 10	Nominations	Housemates nominated for the third time, this time they were required to nominate face-to-face in Big Brother's "Kissing Booth". David, Ekin-Su, Fern, Levi and Louis received the most nominations and therefore faced the public vote.
Day 10	Punishments	As punishment for discussing nominations on two occasions, Louis had to wash-up, make cups of tea and set the dining table, whilst Marisha; who had also broke the rules, had to become his helper.
Day 11	Tasks	Housemates had to produce a series of podcasts in "Shed Talks". David and Bradley presented "The Daily Show" in which they discussed topics surrounding dating and relationships. Colson, Louis, Levi and Nikita fronted "Boomers vs. Zoomers" and spoke about which generation had it better based on different questions. The final podcast featured Ekin-Su, Fern, Marisha and Zeze who discussed what makes women powerful. The housemate later had to vote for the two best podcasters, who were ultimately rewarded with a slumber party. They chose David and Zeze respectively.
Day 12	Exits	Levi and Ekin-Su became the third and fourth housemates to be evicted respectively, after receiving the fewest votes to save.
Day 13	Tasks	For this week's shopping task, the house was transformed into a "Twisted Fairy Tale Kingdom. Housemates first had to rank themselves from Good to Evil. As Louis and Zeze were ranked the "most evil" by their fellow housemates, they were appointed the "Evil Rulers" and reigned over the kingdom from the tower upstairs, leaving only to address their subjects. Meanwhile the other housemates were dressed as fairy tale characters and had to undertake various chores. For the first part of the task the "Evil Rulers" had to choose the three "most brainless subjects". They chose Bradley, David and Nikita, who had to take part in the "Twisted Tea Party" in which they had to answer questions based on the series before eating a disgusting food item from the spread in front of them. The housemates failed to answer the majority of questions correctly and therefore failed this part of the task. For the second part of the task, the "Evil Rulers" had to choose the three "most heartless subjects". They chose Colson, David and Fern who had to "show they had a heart" by making themselves cry and filling up a vial with their tears. At the end of the challenge, they each had to pour their tears into a large vial and had to have produced enough tears to surpass the red line; They failed to do so however, and failed this part of the task. For the final part of the shopping task, housemates had to "show courage" by deciding amongst themselves which of them would receive a "killer nomination" and therefore automatically face the public vote. As "Evil Rulers", Louis and Zeze could not be chosen. They ultimately chose Nikita. As housemates were unsuccessful in completing the majority of challenges, they failed this week's shopping task and therefore received an economy shopping budget.
Day 13	Twists	During the final part of the shopping task, housemates had to decide which of them would receive a "killer nomination" and therefore automatically face eviction. As "Evil Rulers", Louis and Zeze could not be chosen. They ultimately chose Nikita to face the public vote.
Day 14	Nominations	Housemates nominated for the final time. Fern, Marisha and Zeze received the most nominations therefore joined Nikita in facing the public vote.
Day 14	Twists	As the first housemate to enter the diary room when instructed by Big Brother, Fern discovered a pot of gold and a snake, and was told that she had the power to evict one housemate by placing the snake on the pillow of the housemate she wanted to evict. However, unbeknownst to her; the housemate she chose would instead be awarded immunity from nominations. She chose Louis, who was subsequently granted immunity.
Day 15	Tasks	Several housemates were put on trial in "Big Brother's Courtroom", whilst the others had to prepare a prosecution and a defence. Any housemate found guilty would be sent to jail. Lauren also returned to the house as the "judge". During the trials, Marisha was charged with being a "gameplayer", and was prosecuted by David and defended by Zeze. She was found guilty. David was charged with "inconsiderate noise pollution". He was prosecuted by Louis, and was defended by Fern before ultimately being found guilty. Finally, Bradley was put on trial for "cowardice". After being prosecuted by Colson, and defended by Marisha, he was found not guilty. As guilty housemates, Marisha and David were sent to jail, along with Fern, Zeze and Colson who all lost their cases.
Day 16	Tasks	David was set a secret mission by Big Brother to start an argument within the house, however unbeknownst to him; the other housemates were in on it and were set a further mission to sabotage David's mission by resisting his attempts to start an argument, instead having to de-escalate the situation and avoid conflict, which they ultimately did.; Housemates competed against each other in "Big Brother's Big Balls". They were separated into two teams led by Nikita and Zeze, who chose their players. The red team consisted of Colson, David, Louis and Nikita; whilst the yellow team was made up of Bradley, Fern, Marisha and Zeze. Each team had to protect a set of balloons, whilst attempting to pop the other team's balloons. The winning team would be rewarded with a takeaway of their choice. Fern was injured during the task and was forced to sit out, whilst Louis opted out to even up the teams. The red team were declared the winners and were awarded a Chinese takeaway.
Day 16	Exits	Marisha and Zeze became the fifth and sixth housemates to be evicted respectively, after receiving the fewest votes to save.
Day 17	Tasks	Fern was asked by Big Brother to practice her interviewing skills by holding one-on-one chats with each housemate.
Day 17	Events	One by one, each housemate visited the rendezvous, a room in which they were greeted by a friend or relative. David was visited by his friend, Louis was visited by Sinitta, Fern was visited by her daughter, Colson was visited by his mum and Nikita was visited by his girlfriend. Bradley, who was the final housemate to enter, was instead met by host AJ Odudu, who entered and ultimately told him he was the seventh housemate to be evicted.
Day 17	Exits	Bradley became the seventh housemate to be evicted, via the back door, after receiving the fewest votes to save.
Day 19	Exits	Fern left the house in fifth place, Louis left the house in fourth place and Colson left the house in third place. David was then announced as the winner, leaving Nikita as the runner-up.

== Production ==
In August 2022, ITV plc. announced that they were reviving Big Brother in 2023. However, it was not initially confirmed as to whether they were planning to revive Celebrity Big Brother alongside it. In October 2023, the twentieth civilian series launched on ITV2 presented by AJ Odudu and Will Best, and several reports of a revival of Celebrity Big Brother began circulating. In November 2023, during the fifth live eviction episode of the civilian series, it was announced that Celebrity Big Brother would return on ITV in 2024, presented by Odudu and Best. An ITV press release confirmed the decision to recommission the celebrity version was reached "following the success of the civilian series", and that "a star-studded celebrity edition would air on ITV1 and STV following year". Unlike the civilian series, which is broadcast on ITV2, the celebrity series aired exclusively on the main ITV network. The show's spin off series Celebrity Big Brother: Late & Live is planned to air on ITV2, with the Celebrity Big Brother: Live Stream airing daily on ITVX.

=== House ===
The series was filmed at the same house built for the twentieth civilian series, located at Garden Studios in North London. The house followed the same design as the twentieth civilian series, however the colour schemes were changed slightly as well as other elements of decor. Another addition was the gold stars featured on the walls and furniture in rooms throughout the house. The Diary Room chair was revealed on 29 February 2024, and is the same chair used for the twentieth civilian series, but features a gold star in the centre and one of the light panels behind the chair features pink lightbulbs. The "Big Brother eye" at the foot of the garden that was previously a seating area has instead been filled with plants.

=== Eye logo ===
During the 20-second teaser aired in November 2023, it depicted the basic eye logo template similar to the one used for the civilian series teaser, however featured a star in the centre instead. The show's narrator Marcus Bentley teased the series with the tagline "Celebrities... Big Brother is coming to get you." On 9 February 2024, the official eye logo for the series was revealed during that evening's episode of Love Island: All Stars on ITV2. The logo uses the same design as the twentieth civilian series, but instead features a "star" in the centre and several of the emojis have been replaced with a trophy, champagne glasses and a camera respectively.

=== Trailer ===
The trailer for the series was released on 15 February 2024, featuring "celebrities" in various scenarios covering their faces with different objects as they attempt to evade the paparazzi. It concludes with hosts Odudu and Best stood outside the Big Brother house during which they state the tagline "They [the celebrities] can run... but there is one place they can't hide".

== Release ==
=== Broadcast ===
The series began on 4 March 2024 and ran for 19 days, the shortest duration of a celebrity version since the third series in 2005, which was covered over 17 episodes, airing six nights a week from Sunday to Friday at 9pm. Six episodes of which are 90-minute shows, this includes the launch show, the live evictions which are set to air twice a week, and the final. Celebrity Big Brother: Late & Live follows at 10pm on ITV2. Following this, the Celebrity Big Brother: Live Stream covered live feed from the house "into the small hours every night" on ITVX, which aired seven nights a week from 11pm until 2am from Sunday from Friday, and from 9pm until 2am on Saturdays. The series concluded with a 90-minute finale episode.

== Ratings ==
Official ratings are taken from the Broadcasters' Audience Research Board. The live launch on 4 March was watched by 3.8 million across all devices, making it the most watched launch since Celebrity Big Brother 8 in 2011.

	Official viewers (millions)		
	Week 1	Week 2	Week 3
Sunday	No broadcast	2.26	2.10
Monday	3.77	2.75	2.15
Tuesday	3.05	2.35	2.10
Wednesday	2.83	2.29	2.32
Thursday	2.92	2.12	2.15
Friday	2.77	2.10	2.21
Weekly average	3.07	2.31	2.17
Running average	3.07	2.66	2.51
Series average	2.51		
Blue-coloured boxes denote live shows.

=== Late & Live ===
	Official viewers (millions)		
	Week 1	Week 2	Week 3
Sunday	No broadcast	0.37	0.41
Monday	0.49	0.36	0.39
Tuesday	0.35	0.62	0.49
Wednesday	0.40	0.41	0.43
Thursday	0.42	0.34	0.45
Friday	0.41	0.61	0.54
