= Nikita Kuzmin =

Ukrainian dancer and choreographer

- Нікіта Кузьмін
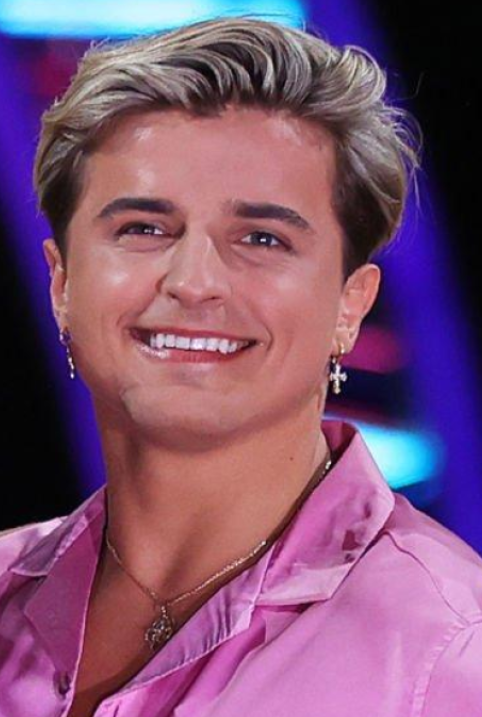
- Kuzmin in 2023
- Born: 23 December 1997 (age 28); Kyiv, Ukraine
- Occupations: Dancer; Choreographer; Presenter
- Known for: Let's Dance; Strictly Come Dancing; Celebrity Big Brother
- Height: 5'11
- Relatives: Anastasia Kuzmina (sister)

Nikita Kuzmin (Ukrainian: Нікіта Кузьмін; born 23 December 1997) is a Ukrainian dancer and choreographer. He is best known for being a professional dancer on the RTL and BBC One dance competitions Let's Dance and Strictly Come Dancing. Kuzmin is also the holder of six Italian Championship titles. In 2024 he was the runner-up on the 23rd series of Celebrity Big Brother.

== Early life ==
Kuzmin was born on 23 December 1997 in Kyiv, Ukraine. His family moved to Italy when Kuzmin was nine. At 13 years of age he was diagnosed with type 1 diabetes. He has an older sister, Anastasia Kuzmina, who has appeared as a professional dancer on Ballando con le Stelle. He has lived in Frankfurt, Germany since the age of 18.

== Career ==
=== Let's Dance ===
In 2020, Kuzmin became a professional dancer on the RTL dance competition Let's Dance for the 13th season, where he was partnered with rapper Sabrina Setlur. They were the second couple to be eliminated. Kuzmin did not return for the 14th season.

Season	Partner	Place
13	Sabrina Setlur	13th

==== Season 13 ====
Celebrity partner: Sabrina Setlur

Week	Dance	Music	Judges' scores (Note: Individual judges' scores are listed in the following order: Jorge González, Motsi Mabuse, Joachim Llambi.)			Total score	Result
LS	Group Tango	"Hey Sexy Lady"	5	5	5	15	No Elimination
1	Viennese Waltz	"Dangerous Woman"	4	4	1	9	Bottom two
2	Cha-Cha-Cha	"On the Floor"	5	5	2	12	Eliminated

=== Strictly Come Dancing ===
On 26 July 2021, Kuzmin was announced as one of four new professional dancers joining the nineteenth series of Strictly Come Dancing. Upon joining the show, Kuzmin said "I've always been amazed by the magic Strictly Come Dancing brings and that no matter what country I have found myself living in, I've never missed a chance to watch it. Joining it as a professional dancer is my big chance to make some magic on the most famous dance floor. I can't wait to give it my all." Kuzmin has also previously worked for judge Motsi Mabuse's dance company in Germany. In his first season, Kuzmin was paired with Tilly Ramsay; they were eliminated from the competition in week 10. In his second season, Kuzmin was paired with Ellie Simmonds; they were eliminated from the competition in week 7. In his third season, Kuzmin was paired with Layton Williams. They made it to the final where they finished as joint runners-up, alongside Bobby Brazier and Dianne Buswell, and behind series champions Ellie Leach and Vito Coppola. In his fourth season, Kuzmin was paired with Sam Quek; they were eliminated in week 7. In his fifth season, Kuzmin was initially paired with Dani Dyer, however following the launch show, Dyer sustained a fractured ankle during rehearsal and had to withdraw from the competition. He was subsequently re-partnered with Dyer's replacement Amber Davies, prior to the first live show. In 2026, he was paired with Dyer again the following series.

Series	Partner	Place	Average score
19	Tilly Ramsay	6th	31.5
20	Ellie Simmonds	10th	29.2
21	Layton Williams	2nd	36.8
22	Sam Quek	10th	27.0
23	Amber Davies	2nd	36.2
24	Dani Dyer		24.0

Dance	Partner	Highest	Partner	Lowest
American Smooth	Dani Dyer	36	Sam Quek	29
Argentine Tango	Layton Williams	40	Amber Davies	33
Cha-cha-cha	Layton Williams	37	Ellie Simmonds	26
Charleston	Layton Williams; Amber Davies	40	Sam Quek	22
Couple's Choice	Tilly Ramsay; Amber Davies	40	Layton Williams	39
Foxtrot	Tilly Ramsay	36	Sam Quek; Dani Dyer	23
Instant Dance	Amber Davies	4		
Jive	Amber Davies	40	Tilly Ramsay	27
Paso Doble	Layton Williams	40	Sam Quek; Ellie Simmonds Dani Dyer	30
Quickstep	Layton Williams	40	Sam Quek	26
Rumba	Layton Williams	36	Dani Dyer	25
Salsa	Layton Williams	39	Ellie Simmonds	30
Samba	Tilly Ramsay	30	Dani Dyer	22
Showdance	Layton Williams; Amber Davies	39		
Tango	Amber Davies	37	Dani Dyer	27
Viennese Waltz	Amber Davies	35	Layton Williams	28
Waltz	Ellie Simmonds	30	Tilly Ramsay	21

Color key:

Winners
Runners-up
Withdrew
- Green number indicates when Nikita and his partner were at the top of the leaderboard.
- Red number indicates when Nikita and his partner were at the bottom of the leaderboard.

==== Series 19 ====
Celebrity partner: Tilly Ramsay

Week	Dance	Music	Judges' scores (Note: Individual judges' scores are listed in the following order: Craig Revel Horwood, Motsi Mabuse, Shirley Ballas, Anton Du Beke.)				Total score	Result
1	Waltz	"Consequences"	5	5	6	5	21	No Elimination
2	Charleston	"Yes Sir, That's My Baby"	8	9	9	8	34	Safe
3	Jive	"The Nicest Kids in Town"	6	7	7	7	27	Safe
4	Paso Doble	"Diablo Rojo"	6	8	9	9	32	Safe
5	Foxtrot	"Little Things"	9	9	9	9	36	Safe
6	Cha-Cha-Cha	"Spooky Movies"	8	9	9	9	35	Safe
7	Tango	"Kings & Queens"	8	8	7	8	31	Bottom two
8	Quickstep	"I Won't Dance"	7	7	7	8	29	Bottom two
9	Couple's Choice	"Revolting Children"	10 (Note: Cynthia Erivo filled in for Craig Revel Horwood in Week 9.)	10	10	10	40	Safe
10	Samba	"Levitating"	7	7 (Note: Cynthia Erivo also filled in for Motsi Mabuse in Week 10.)	8	8	30	Eliminated

==== Series 20 ====
Celebrity partner: Ellie Simmonds

Week	Dance	Music	Judges' scores (Note: Individual judges' scores are listed in the following order: Craig Revel Horwood, Motsi Mabuse, Shirley Ballas, Anton Du Beke.)				Total score	Result
1	Cha-Cha-Cha	"Dance"	6	7	7	6	26	No Elimination
2	Waltz	"Can't Help Falling in Love"	7	8	7	8	30	Safe
3	Quickstep	"Peppy and George"	6	7	7	7	27	Safe
4	Salsa	"I Love Your Smile"	7	8	7	8	30	Safe
5	Paso Doble	"Montagues and Capulets"	6	8	8	8	30	Safe
6	Foxtrot	"Scooby-Doo, Where Are You!"	6	8	7	8	29	Safe
7	Charleston	"Too Darn Hot"	7	9	8	9	33	Eliminated

==== Series 21 ====
Celebrity partner: Layton Williams

Week	Dance	Music	Judges' scores (Note: Individual judges' scores are listed in the following order: Craig Revel Horwood, Motsi Mabuse, Shirley Ballas, Anton Du Beke.)				Total score	Result
1	Samba	"Touch"	7	8	7	7	29	No Elimination
2	Quickstep	"Puttin' On The Ritz"	9	9	9	9	36	Safe
3	Viennese waltz	"There Are Worse Things I Could Do"	7	7	7	7	28	Safe
4	Cha-cha-cha	"Million Dollar Bill"	9	10	9	9	37	Safe
5	Salsa	"Quimbara"	9	10	10	10	39	Safe
6	Tango	"Vampire"	9	9	9	9	36	Safe
7	Jive	"Shake Ur Body"	8	10	10	8	36	Safe
8	Argentine tango	"Tattoo"	9	10	10	10	39	Safe
9	Couple's Choice	"Ain't No Other Man"	9	10	10	10	39	Safe
10	American Smooth	"It's Oh So Quiet"	8	9	8	9	34	Bottom two
11	Paso doble	"Backstage Romance"	10	10	10	10	40	No Elimination
12	Rumba	"Lift Me Up"	9	9	9	9	36	Safe
12	Charleston	"Fit as a Fiddle"	10	10	10	10	40	Safe
13	Quickstep	"Puttin' On The Ritz"	10	10	10	10	40	Runner-up
13	Showdance	"Friend Like Me"	9	10	10	10	39	Runner-up
13	Argentine tango	"Tattoo"	10	10	10	10	40	Runner-up

==== Series 22 ====
Celebrity partner: Sam Quek

Week	Dance	Music	Judges' scores (Note: Individual judges' scores are listed in the following order: Craig Revel Horwood, Motsi Mabuse, Shirley Ballas, Anton Du Beke.)				Total score	Result
1	Foxtrot	"Where Did Our Love Go"	6	6	6	5	23	No Elimination
2	Charleston	"The Charleston"	4	6	6	6	22	Safe
3	Paso Doble	"Elevation (Tomb Raider Mix)"	7	8	7	8	30	Safe
4	Samba	"Hips Don't Lie"	7	7	7	7	28	Safe
5	Quickstep	"Unwritten"	6	7	6	7	26	Safe
6	Jive	"Time Warp"	7	8	8	8	31	Safe
7	American Smooth	"Love Story"	6	8	7	8	29	Eliminated

==== Series 23 ====
Celebrity partner: Amber Davies

Week	Dance	Music	Judges' scores (Note: Individual judges' scores are listed in the following order: Craig Revel Horwood, Motsi Mabuse, Shirley Ballas, Anton Du Beke.)				Total score	Result
1	Waltz	"When We Were Young"	7	7	7	6	27	No Elimination
2	Samba	"Bam Bam"	8	7	7	7	29	Safe
3	American Smooth	"Sixteen Going on Seventeen"	8	9	9	9	35	Safe
4	Argentine tango	"Angel of My Dreams"	8	9	8	8	33	Safe
5	Cha-cha-cha	"Break Free"	8	8	8	9	33	Bottom two
6	Viennese waltz	"I See Red"	9	9	8	9	35	Safe
7	Salsa	"You Make Me Feel (Mighty Real)"	9	10	9	10	38	Safe
8	Paso doble	"Dream On"	9	10	9	10	38	Safe
9	Quickstep	"Reach"	9	9	9	9	36	No Elimination
10	Jive	"Proud Mary"	10	10	10	10	40 (Note: The couple also received four extra points for their Samba to "Whenever, Wherever" by Shakira in the Instant Dance.)	Safe
11	Charleston	"Sit Down, You're Rockin' the Boat"	10	10	10	10	40	Bottom two
12	Tango	"Higher	9	10	9	9	37	Bottom two
12	Couple's choice	"Fly Me to the Moon"	10	10	10	10	40	Bottom two
13	Paso doble	"Dream On"	9	10	10	10	39	Runner-up
13	Showdance	"Rain on Me"	9	10	10	10	39	Runner-up
13	Jive	"Proud Mary"	10	10	10	10	40	Runner-up

==== Series 24 ====
Celebrity partner: Dani Dyer

Week	Dance	Music	Judges' scores (Note: Individual judges' scores are listed in the following order: Craig Revel Horwood, Motsi Mabuse, Shirley Ballas, Anton Du Beke.)				Total score	Result
1	Samba	"Lush Life"	6	5	5	6	22	No Elimination
2	Foxtrot	"Beauty and the Beast"	6	6	5	6	23	Safe
3	Tango	"Show Me Love"	7	7	6	7	27	Safe
4	Rumba	"Hero"	6	6	6	7	25	Safe
5	Salsa	"Despechá"	7	8	8	8	31	Safe
6	Viennese waltz	"My Favourite Things"	8	8	8	8	32	Safe
7	American Smooth	"It Had to Be You"	8	10	9	9	36	Safe

==== Christmas Specials ====
Celebrity partners: Tamzin Outhwaite (2024)

Year	Dance	Music	Judges' scores (Note: Individual judges' scores are listed in the following order: Craig Revel Horwood, Motsi Mabuse, Shirley Ballas, Anton Du Beke.)				Total score	Result
2024	Viennese Waltz	"Hallelujah"	9	9	9	10	37	Participant

== Other work ==
In March 2024 Kuzmin entered the Celebrity Big Brother house as a housemate on the 23rd series. He finished the series in second place behind David Potts of Ibiza Weekender fame.

In September 2024 Kuzmin announced he would appear with Jowita Przystał at "Dancing with the Stars Weekends" 2025.

== Personal life ==
In March 2022, Kuzmin appeared on Lorraine to discuss his fears for his grandmother living in Ukraine following the Russian invasion of Ukraine. They were later reunited.

In October 2023, Kuzmin was reported to be dating a model called Lauren Jaine.

He is a Type 1 diabetic, having been diagnosed at the age of 13. His CGM sensor is often visible in his Strictly Come Dancing costumes.

== Filmography ==
=== Television ===
Year	Title	Channel	Role
2020	Let's Dance	RTL	Professional dancer (Season 13)
2021–present	Strictly Come Dancing	BBC One	Professional dancer (Seasons 19-24)
2024	The Weakest Link	BBC One	Contestant; 1 episode.
2024	Celebrity Big Brother	ITV1	Runner-up; series 23
2025	Celebrity Mastermind	BBC Two	Contestant; 1 episode.

=== Stage ===
Year	Title	Role
2022–present	Strictly Come Dancing Live!	Professional dancer
2025	Nikita Kuzmin: Midnight Dancer	Himself
2026	Burn the Floor: Supernova	Himself
