= Zeze Millz =

English television personality and presenter (born 1989)

- Born: Zalika Kamilah Miller; 30 July 1989 (age 36); Hackney, London, England
- Occupations: Television personality and presenter
- Years active: 2018–present

Zalika Kamilah Miller (born 30 July 1989), known professionally as Zeze Millz, is a British television personality. She hosted her own show, The Zeze Millz Show, on YouTube and she has since gone on to front projects for Channel 4 including Unapologetic and Young, Black and Right-Wing. She has also appeared on Celeb Cooking School and was a housemate on the twenty-third series of Celebrity Big Brother.

== Life and career ==
=== The Zeze Millz Show and #headscarfdiaries ===
Millz was born Zalika Kamilah Miller on 30 July 1989 in Hackney, London. Since 2018, she has hosted her own YouTube series The Zeze Millz Show in which she interviews a variety of guests, primarily members of the Black British music industry including Fireboy DML, Wiley, Big Narstie, Beenie Man and Ambush Buzzworl, as well as Black police officers from the Metropolitan Police. During the COVID-19 pandemic, Millz was made redundant from her marketing job. She began her career in the media after she and her friends were prevented from entering a West End nightclub because they were dark-skin Black women and "too big", which lead her to start an Instagram series, #headscarfdiaries. She concentrates on issues that affect Black women, and has talked about being opinionated, getting into social commentary, and colourism in the music industry. Millz said during an interview on BBC Radio 1Xtra that she was "tired of being the strong black woman".

=== Television and media work ===
Since 2021, Millz has begun co-hosting the +44 Podcast alongside Sideman. In September 2021, she co-presented a one-off late night chat show Unapologetic with Yinka Bokinni as part of Channel 4's "Black to Front" special. The show was commissioned for a full series and began airing in November 2021. The series focuses on "black guests talking freely about the big issues of the day and what's new on social media." It's been described as a "late-night discussion programme that doesn't hold back". Her interview with White Yardie where she and Bokinni discussed what defines Black culture was criticised because Yardie was asked when he "decided to be Jamaican". Millz has frequently been involved with the MOBO Awards, working behind the scenes, as a nominee and was a guest host for 2021 ceremony. She appeared with Harry Pinero in a four-part series Drama vs. Reality in December 2021 for Complex UK and ITV in which she represented Reality TV. Millz also appeared in Aml Ameen's film Boxing Day as herself and featured in the music video for Stormzy's song "Mel Made Me Do It".

She was interviewed on the Wunmi Bello show in April 2022. In July 2022, she appeared in Dine Hard With Rosie Jones. In September 2022, Millz was a contestant on the first series of Celeb Cooking School. She was fifth to be eliminated. Millz was one of the presenters at the GRM Daily Rated Awards in October 2022 and was also nominated for Personality of the Year. In November 2022, Millz produced a feature for Channel 4 titled Young, Black and Right-Wing.

In October 2023, Millz presented a one-off ITVX series Breaking Through with Zeze Millz in which she interviewed Black actresses, Adjoa Andoh, Ruby Barker and Channique Sterling-Brown as they discussed their personal experiences and shared insights about the industry. In March 2024, Millz appeared as a housemate on the twenty-third series of Celebrity Big Brother.

== Filmography ==
As herself
Year	Title	Role	Ref.
2018–present	The Zeze Millz Show	Presenter; YouTube series	
2019–2020	Good Morning Britain	Guest; 3 episodes	
2021	Unapologetic	Presenter	
2023	Culture Caspule	Guest; 1 episode	
2021	The Big Narstie Show	Guest; 1 episode	
2021	Boxing Day	Film	
2022	Celeb Cooking School	Contestant; series 1	
2022	Young, Black and Right-Wing	Presenter	
2022	Don't Hate the Playaz	Guest; 1 episode	
2023	Rhod Gilbert's Growing Pains	Guest; 1 episode	
2023	Breaking Through with Zeze Millz	Presenter	
2024	Celebrity Big Brother	Housemate; series 23	

== Podcasts ==
- +44 Podcast (2021–present)
