= Poppy O'Toole =

English chef and social media personality (born 1994)

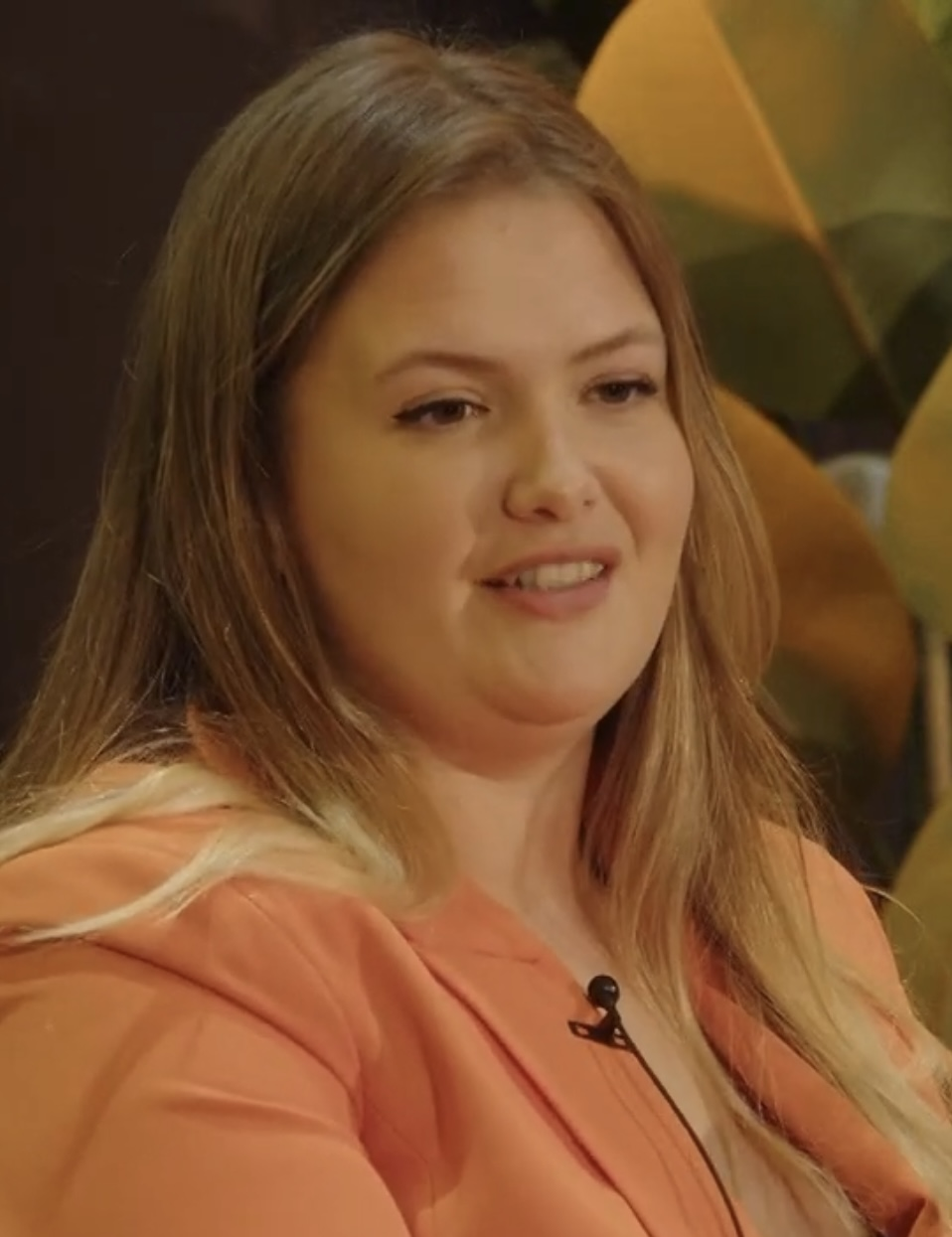
- O'Toole in 2023
- Born: 17 January 1994 (age 32); Bromsgrove, England
- Occupations: Chef; social media personality
- Years active: 2020–present

Poppy O'Toole (born 17 January 1994) is an English chef and social media personality. She spent several years working in restaurants before losing her job due to the COVID-19 pandemic. She subsequently turned to TikTok, where she became known as the "Potato Queen". Since 2021, she has published five cookbooks, four of which have topped The Sunday Times Bestseller List. She has also made regular appearances on Saturday Kitchen, Celeb Cooking School, Young MasterChef, and Cooking with the Stars.

== Life and career ==
Poppy O'Toole was born in Bromsgrove on 17 January 1994 and has a younger brother and sister; all three are of Irish descent. She attended South Bromsgrove High School, during which time she worked in the kitchens of a local pub and a care home. After leaving school, O'Toole undertook an apprenticeship under Glynn Purnell at his Birmingham restaurant Purnell's, where she worked her way up to chef de partie before moving on to Alex Claridge's Birmingham restaurant The Wilderness. She then worked as a sous chef for JPMorgan Chase and later for AllBright, a women's private members club in Mayfair. She has stated that she experienced sexism from colleagues during this period including sexual assault, an owner announcing the contents of a sex dream he had enjoyed in front of her and her appreciative co-workers, and being told that she was only promoted because the head chef fancied her and that employers not wanting to pay maternity pay would preclude her from a fine dining career after 25.

O'Toole was furloughed in March 2020 due to the COVID-19 pandemic and made redundant in August. Following the former, she and her partner moved back in with her mother and O'Toole began producing TikTok content under the name "Poppy Cooks" after being shown the platform by her younger siblings; her first video was published on 1 April. Her content, which she began making with the intention of making her viewers' lives brighter, primarily comprises recipes and posts calling out sexism. She was subsequently dubbed the "Potato Queen" on the platform and the "High Priestess of Potato" by Nigella Lawson. O'Toole released the cookbook The Food You Need in September 2021.

In April 2022, O'Toole began appearing regularly on Saturday Kitchen. An appearance in December 2023 attracted press attention after she accidentally mispronounced the word "whim" as "quim", an archaic name for a vulva, prompting apologies from the host. The word subsequently trended on social media. She co-presented Celeb Cooking School with Melvin Odoom and Giorgio Locatelli in September 2022 and appeared as a contestant on The Weakest Link in December 2022. She then co-presented a series of Young MasterChef with Kerth Gumbs in 2023 and then a second series the following year with television personality Big Has. By the time of the second series, she had also appeared on Big Zuu's Big Eats.

O'Toole released The Actually Delicious Air Fryer Cookbook in 2023; similarly titled books with "Slow Cooker" and "One Pot" recipes followed in 2024 and 2025. She then judged an episode of CBBC's Style It Out and appeared as a guest chef on Jamie Oliver's Air Fryer Meals on Channel 4 before mentoring Linford Christie and Ekin-Su Cülcüloğlu in the 2024 and 2025 series of Cooking with the Stars. By the time of the last of these, she had judged an episode of Food Network's Last Bite Hotel and been a contestant on that network's House of Knives. In February 2025, she published the cookbook The Potato Book, signed an open letter denouncing sexism in kitchens following comments by Jason Atherton underestimating its prevalence, and criticised a commenter for criticising her weight.

By August, four of her books had topped The Sunday Times Bestseller List. O'Toole married her partner that month at Redditch registry office and then at a restaurant near Tenbury Wells in August 2025 and announced that she had given birth to a daughter in December 2025. She judged an episode of Celebrity Masterchef in November 2025 and partnered with Walkers in January 2026 to help judge submissions for a competition to create new crisp flavours.

== Filmography ==
- Saturday Kitchen (2022–present, guest chef)
- Celeb Cooking School (2022, co-host)
- The Weakest Link (2022, contestant)
- Young MasterChef (2023–2024, co-presenter)
- Big Zuu's Big Eats (2023, guest)
- Style It Out (2024, guest judge)
- Celebrity Mastermind (2024, contestant)
- Air Fryer Meals (2024, guest chef)
- Cooking with the Stars (2024–2026, mentor)
- Last Bite Hotel (2024, guest judge)
- House of Knives (2025, contestant)
- Worst Cooks in America (season 29, guest judge)
- Celebrity Masterchef (2025, guest judge)

== Bibliography ==
- O'Toole, Poppy (2021). The Food You Need. Bloomsbury.
- O'Toole, Poppy (2023). The Actually Delicious Air Fryer Cookbook. Bloomsbury.
- O'Toole, Poppy (2024). The Actually Delicious Slow Cooker Coobook. Bloomsbury.
- O'Toole, Poppy (2025). The Potato Book. Bloomsbury.
- O'Toole, Poppy (2025). The Actually Delicious One Pot Cookbook. Bloomsbury.
