= Stephen Bailey =

English comedian and presenter

- Born: 20 June 1986 (age 40); Denton, Greater Manchester, England
- Occupations: Comedian; television presenter
- Television: Celebs on the Farm (2018–present); Celebs on the Ranch; Celebrity Coach Trip (2020)
- Website: www.stephenbaileycomedy.co.uk

Stephen Bailey (born 20 June 1986) is an English stand-up comedian, television presenter and actor. He was the presenter of Celebs on the Farm.

== Life and career ==
Bailey was born on 20 June 1986 in Denton, Greater Manchester, where he was raised. As well as being a comedian, Bailey has presented television shows including Celebs on the Farm on 5Star and later MTV and its spin-off Celebs on the Ranch. In 2020, Bailey took over as presenter of Takeshi's Castle on Comedy Central. Bailey is also the narrator of ITVBe's Ferne McCann: First Time Mum. He has appeared on several television shows including Roast Battle, CelebAbility, Love Island: Aftersun, Celebrity Mastermind, The Stand Up Sketch Show, Hey Tracey!, Good Morning Britain, Zoe Ball on Saturday/Sunday, Celebrity 5 Go... Camping and Richard Osman's House of Games as well as being a regular comedian on Big Brother's Bit on the Side. In 2018, Bailey appeared in two episodes of Coronation Street as M.C, a hairdresser. In 2019, Bailey made his debut on BBC's Live at the Apollo and his first 30-minute comedy special was released on Comedy Central. In 2020, he appeared on E4's Celebrity Coach Trip alongside Brennan Reece. In 2022, he joined Gemma Collins on her theatre tour to present. He appears as John Marsden in the Channel 5 series The Madame Blanc Mysteries. In 2026 Bailey appeared in Russell T Davies’s Channel 4 drama Tip Toe.

== Personal life ==
Bailey is gay. He is a black belt in taekwondo, which he often speaks about in his comedy when talking about breaking down stereotypes. In 2017, Bailey was named one of Attitude magazine's Top 100 Bachelors.
