= Celebs on the Farm =

British reality series

- Genre: Reality television
- Presented by: Stephen Bailey
- Country of origin: United Kingdom
- Original language: English
- No. of series: 3
- No. of episodes: 30

Production
- Executive producer: Richard Woolfe
- Producers: Simon Proctor; Dominic Pissani
- Running time: 60 minutes (including adverts)
- Production company: GooWoo Media

Original release
- Network: 5Star (2018–2019); MTV (2021)
- Release: 20 August 2018 – 19 February 2021

Related
- Celebs on the Ranch

Celebs on the Farm is a British television series that began broadcasting on 5Star from 20 August 2018, presented by Stephen Bailey. The first series consisted of 10 episodes, and was won by Gleb Savchenko. Celebs on the Farm returned for a second series on 26 August 2019. In April 2019, Bailey presented a spin-off version of the series, titled Celebs on the Ranch shot on a remote ranch in Arizona with a new lineup of celebrities. The series was moved to MTV for its third series.

== Series overview ==
This show is a modernised version of the 2004 series The Farm. In it, the show puts a group of celebrities on a farm where they live together for a short period of time. On the farm, the contestants must do typical farmer work involving agriculture and animal rearing. At regular intervals, one of the contestants is evicted from the farm by way of a public telephone vote. This process is continued until only one contestant remains, and then they gain the title of "Top Farmer".

No.	Episodes	Premiere date	Finale date	Contestants	Winner	Runners-up
1	10	20 August 2018	31 August 2018	8	Gleb Savchenko	Ashley McKenzie & Bobby Cole Norris
COTR	10	1 April 2019	12 April 2019	10	Louie Spence	Courtney Green, Jenny Powell, & Siva Kaneswaran
2	10	26 August 2019	6 September 2019	10	Paul Merson	Artem Chigvintsev, Caprice, & David Potts
3	10	8 February 2021	19 February 2021	10	Kerry Katona	Cheryl Hole, Duncan James, & Harry Aikines-Aryeetey

== Series 1 (2018) ==
Celebrity	Known for	Status
Sandi Bogle	Gogglebox regular & television personality	Eliminated 1st on 24 August 2018
Megan McKenna	Country singer & television personality	Eliminated 2nd on 27 August 2018
Lorraine Chase	Actress & former model	Eliminated 3rd on 28 August 2018
Louie Spence	Dancer & TV personality	Eliminated 4th on 30 August 2018
Charlotte Dawson	Former Ex on the Beach contestant	Eliminated 5th on 30 August 2018
Ashley McKenzie	Judoka & olympian	Runners-up on 31 August 2018
Bobby Cole Norris	The Only Way Is Essex personality	Runners-up on 31 August 2018
Gleb Savchenko	Former Strictly Come Dancing & Dancing with the Stars professional	Winner on 31 August 2018

=== Results and elimination ===
Celebrity
Celebrity	Day									
Celebrity	1	2	3	4	5	6	7	8	9	10
Gleb	SAFE	SAFE	SAFE	SAFE	SAFE	SAFE	SAFE	SAFE	SAFE	WINNER
Ashley	SAFE	SAFE	SAFE	SAFE	SAFE	SAFE	SAFE	SAFE	SAFE	RUNNER-UP
Bobby	SAFE	SAFE	SAFE	SAFE	SAFE	SAFE	SAFE	SAFE	SAFE	RUNNER-UP
Charlotte	SAFE	SAFE	SAFE	SAFE	SAFE	SAFE	SAFE	SAFE	ELIM	
Louie	SAFE	SAFE	SAFE	SAFE	SAFE	SAFE	SAFE	SAFE	ELIM	
Lorraine	SAFE	SAFE	SAFE	SAFE	SAFE	SAFE	ELIM			
Megan	SAFE	SAFE	SAFE	SAFE	SAFE	ELIM				
Sandi	SAFE	SAFE	SAFE	SAFE	ELIM					

Keywords

- SAFE = The celebrity advanced to the next day.
- ELIM = The celebrity was eliminated.
- RUNNER-UP = The celebrity was the runner-up.
- WINNER = The celebrity was the winner.

Colour key
The celebrity was eliminated.
The celebrity was awarded best in show.
The celebrity was the runner-up.
The celebrity was the winner.

== Celebs on the Ranch (2019) ==
Celebrity	Known for	Status
Victoria Baker-Harber	Made in Chelsea personality	Eliminated 1st on 4 April 2019
Mark-Francis Vandelli	Made in Chelsea personality	Eliminated 2nd on 8 April 2019
Tanya Bardsley	The Real Housewives of Cheshire personality	Withdrew on 9 April 2019
Georgia Steel	Love Island contestant	Eliminated 3rd on 9 April 2019
Eyal Booker	Love Island contestant	Eliminated 4th on 10 April 2019
Bobby-Cole Norris	The Only Way Is Essex personality	Eliminated 5th on 11 April 2019
Courtney Green	The Only Way Is Essex personality	Runners-up on 12 April 2019
Jenny Powell	Television presenter	Runners-up on 12 April 2019
Siva Kaneswaran	The Wanted singer	Runners-up on 12 April 2019
Louie Spence	Dancer & television personality	Winner on 12 April 2019

=== Results and elimination ===
Celebrity
Celebrity	Day									
Celebrity	1	2	3	4	5	6	7	8	9	10
Louie	SAFE	SAFE	SAFE	SAFE	SAFE	SAFE	SAFE	SAFE	SAFE	WINNER
Courtney	SAFE	SAFE	SAFE	SAFE	SAFE	SAFE	SAFE	SAFE	SAFE	RUNNER-UP
Jenny	SAFE	SAFE	SAFE	SAFE	SAFE	SAFE	SAFE	SAFE	SAFE	RUNNER-UP
Siva	SAFE	SAFE	SAFE	SAFE	SAFE	SAFE	SAFE	SAFE	SAFE	RUNNER-UP
Bobby	SAFE	SAFE	SAFE	SAFE	SAFE	SAFE	SAFE	SAFE	ELIM	
Eyal	SAFE	SAFE	SAFE	SAFE	SAFE	SAFE	SAFE	ELIM		
Georgia	SAFE	SAFE	SAFE	SAFE	SAFE	SAFE	ELIM			
Tanya	SAFE	SAFE	SAFE	SAFE	SAFE	SAFE	QUIT			
Mark-Francis	—N/a	SAFE	SAFE	SAFE	SAFE	ELIM				
Victoria	SAFE	SAFE	SAFE	ELIM						

Keywords

- SAFE = The celebrity advanced to the next day.
- ELIM = The celebrity was eliminated.
- WD = The celebrity withdrew.
- RUNNER-UP = The celebrity was the runner-up.
- WINNER = The celebrity was the winner.

Colour key
The celebrity was eliminated.
The celebrity withdrew.
The celebrity was awarded a horse shoe.
The celebrity was awarded a golden horse shoe and immunity until the finale.
The celebrity was immune from elimination as a result of being awarded a golden horse shoe.
The celebrity was the runner-up.
The celebrity was the winner.

== Series 2 (2019) ==
Celebrity	Known for	Status
Tina Malone	Actress	Eliminated 1st on 29 August 2019
James "Arg" Argent	The Only Way Is Essex star	Eliminated 2nd on 2 September 2019
Kadeena Cox	Paralympian	Eliminated 3rd on 3 September 2019
Charlie Edwards	Boxer	Eliminated 4th on 3 September 2019
Crissy Rock	Former Benidorm actress & comedian	Eliminated 5th on 5 September 2019
Hayley Hughes	Love Island star	Eliminated 6th on 6 September 2019
Artem Chigvintsev	Former Strictly Come Dancing & Dancing with the Stars professional	Runners-up on 6 September 2019
Caprice Bourret	Model & actress	Runners-up on 6 September 2019
David Potts	Ibiza Weekender star	Runners-up on 6 September 2019
Paul Merson	Former footballer & manager	Winner on 6 September 2019

=== Results and elimination ===
Celebrity
Celebrity	Day									
Celebrity	1	2	3	4	5	6	7	8	9	10
Paul	SAFE	SAFE	SAFE	SAFE	SAFE	SAFE	SAFE	SAFE	SAFE	WINNER
Artem	SAFE	SAFE	SAFE	SAFE	SAFE	SAFE	SAFE	SAFE	SAFE	RUNNER-UP
Caprice	—N/a	SAFE	SAFE	SAFE	SAFE	SAFE	SAFE	SAFE	SAFE	RUNNER-UP
David	SAFE	SAFE	SAFE	SAFE	SAFE	SAFE	SAFE	SAFE	SAFE	RUNNER-UP
Hayley	SAFE	SAFE	SAFE	SAFE	SAFE	SAFE	SAFE	SAFE	SAFE	ELIM
Crissy	SAFE	SAFE	SAFE	SAFE	SAFE	SAFE	SAFE	SAFE	ELIM	
Charlie	SAFE	SAFE	SAFE	SAFE	SAFE	SAFE	ELIM			
Kadeena	SAFE	SAFE	SAFE	SAFE	SAFE	SAFE	ELIM			
Arg	SAFE	SAFE	SAFE	SAFE	SAFE	ELIM				
Tina	SAFE	SAFE	SAFE	ELIM						

Keywords

- SAFE = The celebrity advanced to the next day.
- ELIM = The celebrity was eliminated.
- RUNNER-UP = The celebrity was the runner-up.
- WINNER = The celebrity was the winner.

Colour key
The celebrity was eliminated.
The celebrity was awarded best in show.
The celebrity was awarded a golden rosette and immunity from the next elimination.
The celebrity was immune from elimination as a result of being awarded a golden rosette.
The celebrity was the runner-up.
The celebrity was the winner.

== Series 3 (2021) ==
Celebrity	Known for	Status
Linda Robson	Birds of a Feather actress & Loose Women panellist	Eliminated 1st on 11 February 2021
Malique Thompson-Dwyer	Former Hollyoaks actor	Eliminated 2nd on 12 February 2021
Montana Brown	Love Island star	Eliminated 3rd on 15 February 2021
Holly Hagan	Former Geordie Shore star	Eliminated 4th on 17 February 2021
Lady Colin Campbell	Royal biographer & socialite	Eliminated 5th on 17 February 2021
Shaun Williamson	Former EastEnders actor	Eliminated 6th on 19 February 2021
Cheryl Hole	Drag queen & RuPaul's Drag Race UK contestant	Runners-up on 19 February 2021
Harry Aikines-Aryeetey	Olympic sprinter & Gladiators star	Runners-up on 19 February 2021
Duncan James	Blue singer & actor	Runners-up on 19 February 2021
Kerry Katona	Media personality	Winner on 19 February 2021

=== Results and elimination ===
Celebrity
Celebrity	Day									
Celebrity	1	2	3	4	5	6	7	8	9	10
Kerry	SAFE	SAFE	SAFE	SAFE	SAFE	SAFE	SAFE	SAFE	SAFE	WINNER
Cheryl	SAFE	SAFE	SAFE	SAFE	SAFE	SAFE	SAFE	SAFE	SAFE	RUNNER UP
Duncan	SAFE	SAFE	SAFE	SAFE	SAFE	SAFE	SAFE	SAFE	SAFE	RUNNER UP
Harry	SAFE	SAFE	SAFE	SAFE	SAFE	SAFE	SAFE	SAFE	SAFE	RUNNER UP
Shaun	SAFE	SAFE	SAFE	SAFE	SAFE	SAFE	SAFE	SAFE	SAFE	ELIM
Lady C	SAFE	SAFE	SAFE	SAFE	SAFE	SAFE	SAFE	ELIM		
Holly	SAFE	SAFE	SAFE	SAFE	SAFE	SAFE	SAFE	ELIM		
Montana	SAFE	SAFE	SAFE	SAFE	SAFE	ELIM				
Malique	SAFE	SAFE	SAFE	SAFE	ELIM					
Linda	SAFE	SAFE	SAFE	ELIM						

Keywords

- SAFE = The celebrity advanced to the next day.
- ELIM = The celebrity was eliminated.
- RUNNER-UP = The celebrity was the runner-up.
- WINNER = The celebrity was the winner.

Colour key
The celebrity was eliminated.
The celebrity was awarded a best in show.
The celebrity found the prize on the island and was immune from being eliminated
The celebrity was awarded a golden rosette and immunity from the next elimination.
The celebrity was immune from elimination as a result of being awarded a golden rosette.
The celebrity was the runner-up.
The celebrity was the winner.
