= Colson Smith =

English actor (born 1998)

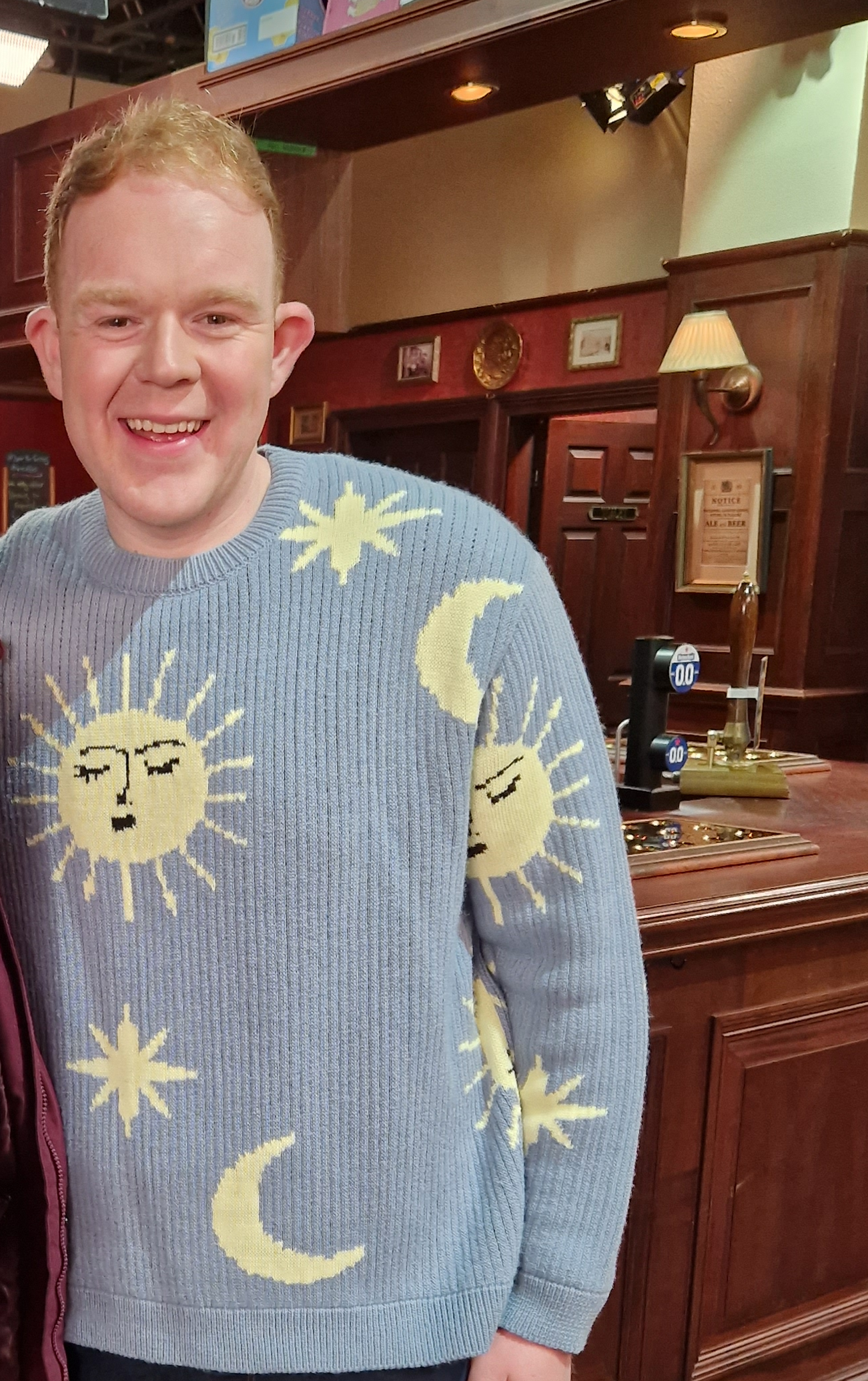
- Smith in 2023
- Born: Colson John Smith; 13 August 1998 (age 27); Dorchester, Dorset, England
- Occupation: Actor
- Years active: 2011–present
- Known for: Role of Craig Tinker in Coronation Street

Colson John Smith (born 13 August 1998) is an English actor, known for portraying the role of Craig Tinker on the ITV soap opera Coronation Street between 2011 and 2025. He has also appeared as a contestant on the ITV reality series The Games (2022) and Celebrity Big Brother (2024).

== Life and career ==
Smith was born on 13 August 1998 in Dorchester, Dorset, and later moved to Castleford, West Yorkshire, where he attended Castleford High School. In 2009, Smith began attending acting classes run by Northern Film and Drama.

In 2011, he was cast as Craig Tinker in the ITV soap opera Coronation Street, the son of Beth Tinker (Lisa George). His character's storylines have included a battle with OCD and becoming a police officer.

For his role of Craig, he was nominated for Best Young Actor at the 2015 Inside Soap Awards.

Outside of Coronation Street, Smith has appeared as Adam Concus in several short films, the first being Platform2C in 2011, followed by Hollows Wood and Jailhouse Dog in 2014. He also appeared as Jack in Reverie.

In 2019 he launched the Sofa Cinema Club podcast alongside his Coronation Street co-stars Ben Price and Jack P. Shepherd. The podcast later rebranded as On The Sofa.

In 2020, Smith took up running to lose weight and released his own YouTube documentary Bored of Being the Fat Kid.

In 2021, he appeared on a celebrity special of Sitting on a Fortune.

In May 2022, he was a contestant on the sporting reality series The Games.

In March 2024, Smith entered the Celebrity Big Brother house to compete in the twenty-third series, and reached the final and came in third

He is a supporter of Leeds United Football Club.

In 2024, Smith featured in the first four episodes of the spin off series I'm a Celebrity: Unpacked, following his fellow Corrie star Alan Halsall featuring in the main show.

In January 2025, Smith announced that he had been axed from Coronation Street after 14 years, with his final scenes airing on 23 May 2025.

After being a cover presenter for BBC Local Radio in Yorkshire on BBC Radio Leeds, BBC Radio Sheffield and BBC Radio York, Smith became the presenter of the Saturday mid-morning show across the three stations in September 2025.

== Filmography ==
Year	Title	Role	Notes
2011	Platform 2C	Adam Concus	Short film
2011–2025	Coronation Street	Craig Tinker	Series regular
2012	Reverie	Jack	Short film
2014	Hollow Wood	Adam Concus	Short film
2014	Jailhouse Dog	Adam Concus	Short film
2021	Sitting on a Fortune	Himself	Contestant
2022	The Games	Himself	Contestant
2024	Celebrity Big Brother	Himself	Finalist 3rd; series 23
2024	I'm a Celebrity: Unpacked	Himself	Guest

== Awards and nominations ==
Year	Award	Category	Work	Result	Ref(s)
2015	Inside Soap Awards	Best Young Actor	Coronation Street	Nominated	
