= Spuddz =

English comedian and internet personality (born 1994)

- Born: Kieran Jasper Weir; 9 March 1994 (age 32); Lambeth, London, England
- Occupations: Comedian; internet personality
- Years active: 2015–present
- Television: Get in the Van; Celebs Go Dating; Celeb Cooking School

Kieran Jasper Weir (born 9 March 1994), known professionally as Spuddz, is an English comedian and internet personality. He began his career in stand-up comedy and became known for his social media videos and online pranks, before co-presenting the Channel 4.0 digital series Get in the Van (2022–present) and appearing on the E4 reality series' Celebs Go Dating and Celeb Cooking School (2023).

== Life and career ==
Spuddz was born Kieran Jasper Weir in Lambeth, London on 9 March 1994. He embarked on a career in comedy when comedian and actor Richard Blackwood overheard him telling a joke in a barber shop and subsequently took him to his first stand-up gig. In 2015, he began uploading videos of his stand-up comedy performances to social media, as well as posting several prank videos on YouTube. During the COVID-19 pandemic, one of videos in which he posed as a Sainsbury's employee and told the public to stop panic buying went viral. In 2020, he won the award for "Best Entertainer" at the Urban Music Awards. He also appeared in an episode of Footasylum's YouTube series Truth Asylum.

In December 2022, Spuddz began co-presenting the online series Get in the Van, alongside America Foster on Channel 4's newly launched online digital channel, Channel 4.0. The series follows teams of influencers using social media to scout the most suitable person to "get in the van" in an array of categories. In August 2023, Spuddz was announced as a cast member on the twelfth series of the E4 dating reality series Celebs Go Dating. He is also set to take part in the second series of the E4 cooking reality series Celeb Cooking School.

== Filmography ==
As himself
Year	Title	Notes	Ref.
2022–present	Get in the Van	Online series	
2023	Celebs Go Dating	Cast member; series 12	
2023	Celeb Cooking School	Contestant; series 2	

== Awards and nominations ==
Year	Award	Category	Result	Ref.
2020	Urban Music Awards	Best Entertainer	Won	
