= I See Red (Everybody Loves an Outlaw song) =

2018 single by Everybody Loves an Outlaw

Single by Everybody Loves An Outlaw
- Released: October 31, 2018
- Length: 3:51
- Label: Columbia Records
- Songwriter: Robbie Nevil
- Producer: Robbie Nevil

Everybody Loves An Outlaw singles chronology
"I See Red" (2018)	"Blood On a Rose" (2020)

"I See Red" is a song by American alt-country duo Everybody Loves an Outlaw, consisting of Bonnie and Taylor Sims. Originally released in 2018, the song gained global prominence in 2020 after its inclusion in the Polish erotic drama film 365 Days. The track's bluesy rock sound and themes of betrayal led to it becoming a viral hit on platforms like TikTok and Spotify, garnering over 400M streams.

== Background and composition ==
The song was written by Bonnie and Taylor Sims alongside producer Robbie Nevil. It was first released on October 31, 2018 as part of their debut EP, also titled I See Red, under Extreme Music. Following its viral success in 2020, the duo signed a record deal with Columbia Records, which re-released the single on July 31, 2020.

"I See Red" is a mid-tempo blues-rock and pop-rock song featuring gritty vocals and heavy guitar instrumentation. Lyrically, the song explores themes of infidelity and vengeful anger, with the narrator describing catching their partner cheating and subsequently "seeing red". The track incorporates a beat inspired by Cher's 1966 song "Bang Bang (My Baby Shot Me Down)".

== Live performances and covers ==
The duo recorded a live version of the song at The Village Studios in Los Angeles in 2023. The song has been widely covered, most notably by Tampa singer Villa in 2020 and Kristen Cruz during her audition on America's Got Talent in 2022. Amber Davies and Nikita Kuzmin performed a Viennese waltz to "I See Red" as part of Strictly Come Dancing's Halloween-themed competition.

== Charts ==
Weekly chart performance
Chart (2020)	Peak position
Scottish Singles Sales (Official Charts)	84
UK Singles (Official Charts)	92
UK Rock & Metal (Official Charts)	4
US Hot Rock & Alternative Songs (Billboard)	14

== Certifications ==
Region	Certification	Certified units/sales
Denmark (IFPI Danmark)	Gold	45,000^{‡}
France (SNEP)	Platinum	200,000^{‡}
New Zealand (RMNZ)	Platinum	30,000^{‡}
United Kingdom (BPI)	Silver	200,000^{‡}
United States (RIAA)	Platinum	1,000,000^{‡}
^{‡} Sales+streaming figures based on certification alone.
