= Cooking with the Stars (British TV series) =

British competitive cooking reality series (2021-present)

- Created by: Jonny Coller; Ed Phillips
- Presented by: Emma Willis; Tom Allen
- Country of origin: United Kingdom
- Original language: English
- No. of series: 6
- No. of episodes: 30

Production
- Executive producers: Caroline Davies; Melanie Leach; Andrew Mackenzie
- Production location: Pinewood Studios
- Running time: 60 minutes (series 1–5); 30 minutes (series 6)
- Production company: South Shore Productions

Original release
- Network: ITV
- Release: 13 July 2021 – present

Cooking with the Stars is a British competitive cooking reality television series. It began airing on 13 July 2021 on ITV and is presented by Emma Willis and Tom Allen.

== Format ==
Eight celebrities are paired with a professional chef who becomes their mentor. The celebrities then compete against each other in a number of cooking battles where they prepare a range of different dishes. During cooking, they have the option to bang the gong (golden frying pan) which allows their mentor to step in and help for two minutes. The mentor chefs also act as the judges, and rate the other celebrity cooks, deciding the winner(s) who will be advancing to the next round, and the losers who are forced to compete in the cook-off. In the cook-off, the bottom two prepare the same dish, with no help from their mentor, in a bid to remain in the competition. The cook-off is judged by a blind taste test, meaning the chefs do not know which celebrity has cooked each dish and therefore potentially allowing them to send their own celebrity home.

== Production ==
The six-episode series was first announced by ITV in April 2021 for a premiere over the summer; it was commissioned from South Shore Productions with funding from British department store chain Marks & Spencer (M&S). It marked the first time that ITV had broadcast a programme co-commissioned with an advertiser in prime time. The series is filmed at Pinewood Studios.

M&S marketing director Sharry Cramond considered the programme to be part of an effort by the chain to emphasize its wider product ranges, and to "accelerate" trends since the COVID-19 pandemic of customers buying its individual products for home cooking as opposed to ready-made meals. As part of this sponsorship, the programme features product placement for M&S, while adverts and other surrounding promotions (including a weekly companion show hosted by YouTubers Woody & Kleiny) highlight the M&S product ranges featured during each episode. M&S had previously been involved with ITV as a sponsor for Britain's Got Talent.

== Series 1 (2021) ==
The celebrities competing in the first series, along with their professional chef mentors were announced on 17 May 2021. The series was won by Harry Judd, who was mentored by Nisha Katona.

Celebrity	Known for	Professional chef	Status
Naughty Boy	DJ, record producer & musician	Judy Joo	Eliminated 1st on 13 July 2021
Catherine Tyldesley	Former Coronation Street actress	Tristan Welch	Eliminated 2nd on 20 July 2021
Griff Rhys Jones	Comedian, actor & presenter	Ronnie Murray	Eliminated 3rd on 27 July 2021
Shirley Ballas	Strictly Come Dancing judge	Joseph Denison Carey	Eliminated 4th on 3 August 2021
Johnny Vegas	Comedian & actor	Rosemary Shrager	Eliminated 5th on 10 August 2021
AJ Odudu	Television presenter	Jack Stein	Third place on 17 August 2021
Denise van Outen	Actress, singer & presenter	Francesco Mazzei	Runner-up on 17 August 2021
Harry Judd	McFly drummer	Nisha Katona	Winner on 17 August 2021

=== Episodes ===
Celebrity was eliminated
Celebrity won the cooking battle
Celebrity finished in third place
Celebrity was the runner-up
Celebrity was the winner

==== Episode 1: British ====
In the first episode, the first four celebrities competed against each other in two separate heats, with the theme being traditional British dishes. The winner of each heat advanced to the next week, whilst the losers competed in the cook-off and one celebrity was eliminated.

Heat	Celebrity	Dish	Result
1	Johnny Vegas	Fillet Steak and Parsley Mash with Savoy Cabbage and Smoky Bacon	Safe
1	Harry Judd	Gingerbread Lamb Chops with Roast Potatoes, Cabbage and Marsala Gravy	In cook-off
2	Shirley Ballas	Butter-Poached Chicken with Braised Leeks, Creamy Mash and Mustard Mayo	Safe
2	Naughty Boy	Pan Fried Scallops with Spring Pea Purée	In cook-off

Cook-off

Celebrity	Dish	Result
Harry Judd	Baked Alaska	Safe
Naughty Boy	Baked Alaska	Eliminated

==== Episode 2: Italian ====
In the second episode, the remaining four celebrities competed in two separate heats. The week's theme was Italian dishes. The winner of each heat advanced to the next week, whilst the losers competed in the cook-off and one celebrity was eliminated.

Heat	Celebrity	Dish	Result
1	Griff Rhys Jones	Pan Fried Salmon with Borlotti Bean and Cavolo Nero Stew and Walnut Pesto	Safe
1	Catherine Tyldesley	Extra-Rich Spaghetti Carbonara with a Pancetta Crumb and Parmesan Tuiles	In cook-off
2	AJ Odudu	Open Ravioli with Lingoustine, Tomato and Basil	Safe
2	Denise van Outen	Tortelli with Burrata, 'Nduja and Balsamic Vinegar	In cook-off

Cook-off

Celebrity	Dish	Result
Catherine Tyldesley	Panna Cotta	Eliminated
Denise van Outen	Panna Cotta	Safe

==== Episode 3: Indian ====
In the third episode, the remaining celebrities prepared Indian dishes in the cooking competitions that consisted of two heats featuring three celebrities. The judges then decided which celebrity to send to the cook-off, whilst the other two celebrities were advanced to the next week.

Heat	Celebrity	Dish	Result
1	Shirley Ballas	Keralan Spiced Chicken Thighs with Pickled Onions, Cabbage Slaw and a Coriander Chutney in a Roti Wrap	Safe
1	Johnny Vegas	Goan Chicken Xacuti with Fragrant Basmati Rice and Chapatis	In cook-off
1	Denise van Outen	Lamb Meatball Curry with Saffron Mashed Potato and Spiced Tenderstem Broccoli	Safe
2	Griff Rhys Jones	Chicken Saag with Lemon Pilau, Coriander Naan and a Cucumber Raita	In cook-off
2	Harry Judd	'Bridal Thali'; Butter Chicken, Tandoori Lamb Chops, South Indian Coconut Meatballs with Fragrant Cardamom Rice	Safe
2	AJ Odudu	Kati Rolls with Pickled Onions, Kachumber Salad, Raita and All Butter Paratha	Safe

Cook-off

Celebrity	Dish	Result
Griff Rhys Jones	Samosas	Eliminated
Johnny Vegas	Samosas	Safe

==== Episode 4: French ====
In the fourth episode, the theme was French dishes. The contestants competed in two heats, and due to the odd number of contestants, the first featured two celebrities and the second featured three celebrities, with the loser of each heat competing in the cook-off as normal and one celebrity was eliminated.

Heat	Celebrity	Dish	Result
1	Shirley Ballas	Sole Meunière with French Fries and Garlic Aioli	In cook-off
1	Johnny Vegas	Duck À L'Orange with Fondant Potato and Chiffonade of Cavalo Nero	Safe
2	Harry Judd	Chicken À La Moutarde; Pasta with Hazelnut Butter and a Peach and Pine Nut Salad	In cook-off
2	AJ Odudu	Bourride of Seabass, Sole and Langoustines	Safe
2	Denise van Outen	Coq Au Vin with Polenta	Safe

Cook-off

Celebrity	Dish	Result
Shirley Ballas	Chocolate Soufflé	Eliminated
Harry Judd	Chocolate Soufflé	Safe

==== Episode 5: Semi-final: South East Asian ====
In semi-final, the celebrities again competed in two heats, cooking South Asian dishes, with the winner advancing to the final, whilst the losing celebrities had to battle it out in the cook off for the remaining spot in the final.

Heat	Celebrity	Dish	Result
1	Johnny Vegas	Surf & Turf Laksa Noodle Soup and Roti Prata	In cook-off
1	Denise van Outen	Thai Green Curry with Langoustines, Scallops & Spring Vegetables	Safe
2	Harry Judd	Malaysian Roti Babi with a Pineapple Salsa and Tamarind Dipping Sauce	Safe
2	AJ Odudu	Northern Thai Chicken Larb, Pork Shoulder Skewers; Sticky Rice and Chargrilled Sweetheart Cabbage	In cook-off

Cook-off

Celebrity	Dish	Result
Johnny Vegas	Pork Dumplings with a Chilli Dipping Sauce	Eliminated
AJ Odudu	Pork Dumplings with a Chilli Dipping Sauce	Safe

==== Episode 6: Final: Signature ====
In the grand final, the final three celebrities are tasked with cooking their mentor chef's signature dish, before the chefs decide which one of them will advance to the final cooking competition, and the two losers go head to head in a cook-off to win the second spot. In the final cooking battle, the remaining two celebrities prepare a dish they'd cooked previously in a bid to be crowned champion.

Celebrity	Dish	Result
Denise van Outen	Potato Gnocchi with Langoustines, Cherry Tomatoes & Asparagus	Safe
AJ Odudu	Rack of Lamb with Braised Peas, New Potatoes, Picked Cucumber and Lamb Sauce	In third place cook-off
Harry Judd	'Chat Bombs'; Puffed Parcels with Red Onion, Chickpeas and Tamarind Chutney	In third place cook-off

Third place cook-off

Celebrity	Dish	Result
Harry Judd	Seared Tuna Steak with Crushed New Potatoes and Peppery Greens	Safe
AJ Odudu	Seared Tuna Steak with Crushed New Potatoes and Peppery Greens	Third place

Final cooking battle

Celebrity	Dish	Result
Denise van Outen	Tortelli with Burrata, 'Nduja and Balsamic Vinegar	Runner-up
Harry Judd	'Bridal Thali'; Butter Chicken, Tandoori Lamb Chops, South Indian Coconut Meatballs with Fragrant Cardamom Rice	Winner

== Series 2 (2022) ==
The celebrities competing in the second series were announced on 11 April 2022. The series was won by Dr. Ranj Singh, who was mentored by Clodagh McKenna.

Celebrity	Known for	Professional chef	Status
Woody Cook	The Circle contestant	Mike Reid	Eliminated 1st on 7 June 2022
Kelly Holmes	Former Olympic middle-distance runner	Ronnie Murray	Eliminated 2nd on 14 June 2022
Anne Hegerty	The Chase quizzer	Jean-Christophe Novelli	Eliminated 3rd on 21 June 2022
Anton Du Beke	Strictly Come Dancing judge & former professional	Rosemary Shrager	Eliminated 4th on 28 June 2022
Maura Higgins	Love Island finalist & television personality	Jack Stein	Eliminated 5th on 5 July 2022
Joe Wilkinson	Comedian & actor	Judy Joo	Third place on 12 July 2022
Josie Gibson	Television personality & presenter	Tony Singh	Runner-up on 12 July 2022
Dr. Ranj Singh	This Morning doctor & presenter	Clodagh McKenna	Winner on 12 July 2022

=== Episodes ===
Celebrity was eliminated
Celebrity won the cooking battle
Celebrity finished in third place
Celebrity was the runner-up
Celebrity was the winner

==== Episode 1: British ====
In the first episode, the first four celebrities competed against each other in two separate heats, with the theme being dishes from Great Britain. The winner of each heat advanced to the next week, whilst the losers competed in the cook-off and one celebrity was eliminated.

Heat	Celebrity	Dish	Result
1	Joe Wilkinson	Fish & Chips with Kimchi Tartare Sauce	In cook-off
1	Anton Du Beke	Pork Chop with Apple Sauce, Crackling and a Sherry & Mustard Jus	Safe
2	Josie Gibson	Duck with Stovies and Brown Sauce Jus	Safe
2	Woody Cook	Rib Eye Steak; Potato & Celeriac Gratin with a Peppercorn Sauce	In cook-off

Cook-off

Celebrity	Dish	Result
Joe Wilkinson	Lemon Meringue Pie	Safe
Woody Cook	Lemon Meringue Pie	Eliminated

==== Episode 2: Spanish ====
In episode two, the remaining four celebrities competed against each other in two separate heats, with the theme being dishes from Spain. The winner of each heat advanced to the next week, whilst the losers competed in the cook-off and one celebrity was eliminated.

Heat	Celebrity	Dish	Result
1	Anne Hegerty	Lamb Rack with Chickpea, Aubergine & Chorizo Stew	Safe
1	Kelly Holmes	Spanish Tapas; Pan-Fried Prawns with Padron Peppers, Anchovy Croquetas & Patatas Bravas with Romesco Sauce	In cook-off
2	Dr. Ranj Singh	Seafood Paella; Smoked Paprika Aioli and Padron Peppers	In cook-off
2	Maura Higgins	Tapas with Tortilla, Basque Crab Gratin and Fried Padron Peppers	Safe

Cook-off

Celebrity	Dish	Result
Kelly Holmes	Churros; Salted Caramel Filling with Chocolate Sauce	Eliminated
Dr. Ranj Singh	Churros; Salted Caramel Filling with Chocolate Sauce	Safe

==== Episode 3: Indian ====
In the third episode, the remaining celebrities prepared Indian dishes in the cooking battles that consisted of two heats featuring three celebrities. The judges then decided which celebrity to send to the cook-off, whilst the other two celebrities were advanced to the next week. The two celebrities in the cook-off then competed against each other with one of them being eliminated.

Heat	Celebrity	Dish	Result
1	Anne Hegerty	Chicken Pilau Pie with Raita and Pineapple Salsa	In cook-off
1	Maura Higgins	Goan Vegetable Curry with Tempura, Raita, Salad and Puri	Safe
1	Anton Du Beke	Lamb Stuffed Paratha with Vegetable Pakora, Mint Yogurt and Spicy Tomato Sauce	Safe
2	Joe Wilkinson	Classic Chicken Tikka Masala with Paratha	Safe
2	Josie Gibson	Wild Mushroom Biryani with Raita	In cook-off
2	Dr. Ranj Singh	Chickpea & Coconut Dahl with Onion Bhajis, Raita & Coriander Naan	Safe

Cook-off

Celebrity	Dish	Result
Anne Hegerty	Dosa with Coriander Chutney	Eliminated
Josie Gibson	Dosa with Coriander Chutney	Safe

==== Episode 4: French ====
In the episode four, the theme was French dishes. The contestants competed in two heats, and due to the odd number of contestants, the first featured two celebrities and the second featured three celebrities, with the loser of each heat competing in the cook-off as normal and one celebrity was eliminated.

Heat	Celebrity	Dish	Result
1	Dr. Ranj Singh	Salmon en Croute with Asparagus & Beurre Blanc and a Watercress Salad	Safe
1	Josie Gibson	Coquilles St Jacques À La Pondicherry	Safe
1	Anton Du Beke	Chicken wrapped in Pancetta, with Bramble Liqueur, Shallots and Mushrooms	In cook-off
2	Joe Wilkinson	Tarte Flambée with Side Salad and Cocktail	In cook-off
2	Maura Higgins	Bouillabaisse with Garlic Croutons and Spicy Mayo	Safe

Cook-off

Celebrity	Dish	Result
Anton Du Beke	Crème Caramel; Housed in a Sugar Cage	Eliminated
Joe Wilkinson	Crème Caramel; Housed in a Sugar Cage	Safe

==== Episode 5: Semi-final: Thai ====
In the semi-final, the celebrities again competed in two heats, cooking dishes from Thailand, with the winner advancing to the final, whilst the losing celebrities had to battle it out in the cook off for the remaining spot in the final.

Heat	Celebrity	Dish	Result
1	Josie Gibson	Aromatic Salt Baked Sea Bass; Accompanied by a Sticky Aubergine Curry, Jasmine Rice and a Dipping Sauce	Safe
1	Joe Wilkinson	Spicy Grilled Pork Salad with a Fragrant Dressing, Coconut Rice and Coriander Crisps	In cook-off
2	Maura Higgins	Chang Mai Curried Noodle Soup	In cook-off
2	Dr. Ranj Singh	Authentic Thai Green Curry; Coconut Rice and Thai Cucumber Salad	Safe

Cook-off

Celebrity	Dish	Result
Joe Wilkinson	Thai Spring Rolls with a Sweet Chilli Sauce	Safe
Maura Higgins	Thai Spring Rolls with a Sweet Chilli Sauce	Eliminated

==== Episode 6: Final: Signature ====
In the grand final, the final three celebrities are tasked with cooking their mentor chef's signature dish, before the chefs decide which one of them will advance to the final cooking competition, and the two losers go head to head in a cook-off to win the second spot. In the final cooking battle, the remaining two celebrities prepare their own signature dish in a bid to be crowned champion.

Celebrity	Dish	Result
Dr. Ranj Singh	Sea Bass in Sicilian Broth with Gnocchi	In third place cook-off
Josie Gibson	Punjabi Prawns with Paratha	Safe
Joe Wilkinson	Korean Fried Chicken	In third place cook-off

Third place cook-off

Celebrity	Dish	Result
Dr. Ranj Singh	Beef Wellington	Safe
Joe Wilkinson	Beef Wellington	Third place

Final cooking battle

Celebrity	Dish	Result
Josie Gibson	Roast Chicken with Roast Potatoes, Cauliflower Cheese and Gravy	Runner-up
Dr. Ranj Singh	Butter Chicken with Vegetable Samosas, Mint and Mango Yoghurt and a Tamarind Chutney	Winner

== Series 3 (2023) ==
The celebrities competing in the third series were announced on 17 April 2023.

Celebrity	Known for	Professional chef	Status
Matt Willis	Busted singer & actor	Shelina Permalloo	Eliminated 1st on 4 July 2023
Chris Eubank	Former professional boxer	Jack Stein	Eliminated 2nd on 11 July 2023
Indiyah Polack	Love Island finalist	Ellis Barrie	Eliminated 3rd on 18 July 2023
Claire Richards	Steps singer	Tony Singh	Eliminated 4th on 25 July 2023
Jason Watkins	Stage & screen actor	April Jackson	Elimated 5th on 1 August 2023
Joanna Page	Gavin & Stacey actress & television presenter	Michael Caines	Third place on 8 August 2023
Peter Andre	Singer & television personality	Rosemary Shrager	Runner up on 8 August 2023
Samia Longchambon	Coronation Street actress	Jean-Christophe Novelli	Winner on 8 August 2023

== Series 4 (2024) ==
The celebrities competing in the fourth series were announced on 2 April 2024.

Celebrity	Known for	Professional chef	Status
Harry Pinero	YouTube personality	Michael O'Hare	Eliminated 1st on 30 July 2024
Christopher Biggins	Stage & screen actor	Rosemary Shrager	Eliminated 2nd on 6 August 2024
Abbey Clancy	Model & television presenter	Michael Caines	Eliminated 3rd on 13 August 2024
Linford Christie	Former Olympic sprinter	Poppy O'Toole	Eliminated 4th on 20 August 2024
Katherine Ryan	Comedian & actress	Jack Stein	Eliminated 5th on 27 August 2024
Pasha Kovalev	Former Strictly Come Dancing professional	April Jackson	Third place on 3 September 2024
Carol Vorderman	Former Countdown presenter	Tony Singh	Runner up on 3 September 2024
Ellie Simmonds	Former Paralympic swimmer	Shelina Permalloo	Winner on 3 September 2024

== Series 5 (2025) ==
The celebrities competing in the fifth series were announced on 17 June 2025.

Celebrity	Known for	Professional chef	Status
Jess Wright	Former The Only Way Is Essex star	Jack Stein	Eliminated 1st on 3 August 2025
Ekin-Su Cülcüloğlu	Love Island winner & actress	Poppy O'Toole	Eliminated 2nd on 10 August 2025
Hugh Dennis	Actor & comedian	April Jackson; Jack Stein (Week 3)	Eliminated 3rd on 17 August 2025
Jordan North	Radio & television presenter	Rosemary Shrager	Eliminated 4th on 24 August 2025
Shaun Wright-Phillips	Former England footballer	Shelina Permalloo	Eliminated 5th on 31 August 2025
Kelly Hoppen	Interior designer & Dragon's Den investor	Michael Caines	Third place on 7 September 2025
Jack Osbourne	Media personality	Elliott Grover	Runner up on 7 September 2025
Natalie Cassidy	Former EastEnders actress	Tony Singh	Winner on 7 September 2025

== Series 6 (2026) ==
The celebrities competing in the sixth series were announced on 28 September 2026. The series began broadcasting on 5 October 2026, and had the biggest cast of celebrities in the show's history, with twelve celebrities participating, instead of the usual eight. In a further change, it was aired in an early evening half-hour timeslot vacated by soap operas, and ran for ten weeks.

Celebrity	Known for	Professional chef	Status
Mark Charnock	Emmerdale actor	Shelina Permalloo	Eliminated 1st on 5 October 2026
Bez	Happy Mondays dancer & musician	Kate Austen	Eliminated 2nd on 12 October 2026
Lesley Joseph	Stage & screen actress	Jean-Philippe Blondet	Eliminated 3rd on 19 October 2026
Seann Walsh	Stand-up comedian	Sam Holland	Eliminated 4th on 26 October 2026
JB Gill	JLS singer & television presenter	Poppy O'Toole	Eliminated 5th on 2 November 2026
Laura Kenny	Olympic cyclist	Tony Singh	Eliminated 6th on 9 November 2026
Caroline Quentin	Actress & television presenter	Michael Caines	Eliminated 7th on 16 November 2026
Harry Aikines-Aryeetey	Olympic sprinter & Gladiators star	Rosemary Shrager	Participating
Joey Essex	Television personality	Nokx Majozi	Participating
Karen Hauer	Former Strictly Come Dancing professional	Angelo Sato	Participating
Scarlett Moffatt	Television personality & presenter	Jack Stein	Participating
Zara McDermott	Television personality & presenter	Elliot Grover	Participating

== Reception ==
The series received positive reviews from critics, with Ben Dowell of The Times describing the show as "exciting, charming and fun with accomplished editing helping to strain every drop of tension."
