= Young MasterChef =

- Genre: Reality show
- Created by: Franc Roddam
- Judges: Poppy O'Toole; Kerth Gumbs; Big Has
- Narrated by: Callie Cooke; Aimée Kelly
- Country of origin: United Kingdom
- Original language: English
- No. of series: 2
- No. of episodes: 15

Production
- Production location: Digbeth Loc Studios
- Running time: 30 minutes (2023); 60 minutes (2024)
- Production companies: Shine TV; Ziji Productions

Original release
- Network: BBC Three
- Release: 2 January 2023 – 5 February 2024

Related
- MasterChef; Junior MasterChef; Celebrity MasterChef; MasterChef: The Professionals

Young MasterChef is a cooking competition broadcast between 2 January 2023 and 5 February 2024 on BBC Three. A derivative of the revived version of MasterChef (1990–2001, 2005–), the series was open for young adults between 18 and 25.

The BBC announced the show in February 2022 and Poppy O'Toole and Kerth Gumbs as hosts in July 2022. O'Toole started uploading videos as Poppy Cooks on TikTok after losing her job to the COVID-19 pandemic in the United Kingdom, while Great British Menu finalist Kerth Gumbs was head chef of The Sky Garden at 20 Fenchurch Street. The show was co-produced by Banijay derivative Shine TV and by Ziji Productions.

== Series overview ==
Five chefs started each of three heats, with three advancing to the final. Over the course of ten episodes, challenges included cooking a meal within a budget of £30, cooking pizza, and replicating a fine dining recipe by Great British Menu champion James Cochran. Of the finalists, the Knebworth entrepreneur Jordan Pomerance was described by V-land UK as the first vegan chef to appear in a UK MasterChef final and the Nottingham law student Keziah Whittaker won the series. Their final challenge was to cook a starter and a showstopper. Gumbs left the show in August 2023 and was replaced by Big Has, another social media chef.

Series two lasted for five episodes and featured nine contestants including TikToker Rima Aishah Begum. The third episode featured as guest judge Danny Malin of the YouTube channel Rate My Takeaway, who challenged the contestants to create fakeaways. The final episode saw finalists recreate a recipe from Tom Booton, who had been head chef at The Grill at The Dorchester in London, and then cook a two-course meal for their families and the judges. The series was won by Famara Kurang, an intern from Brixton Hill.

== Transmissions ==
Series	Start date	End date	Episodes
1	2 January 2023	23 January 2023	10
2	8 January 2024	5 February 2024	5
