= David Potts (TV personality) =

English television personality (born 1993)

- Born: David James Potts; 5 May 1993 (age 33); Bolton, Greater Manchester, England
- Occupation: Television personality
- Years active: 2016–present
- Television: Ibiza Weekender; Celebs Go Dating; Celebs on the Farm; Celebrity Ghost Trip; Celebrity Karaoke Club; The Big Celebrity Detox; Big Brother: Late & Live; Celebrity Big Brother

David James Potts (born 5 May 1993) is an English television personality. From 2016 to 2023, he appeared as head rep on the ITV2 reality series Ibiza Weekender and its successor Kavos Weekender. He has also appeared on the E4 dating series Celebs Go Dating and has finished as runner-up on Celebs on the Farm and Celebrity Karaoke Club. In 2024, he won the twenty-third series of Celebrity Big Brother.

== Life and career ==
Potts was born on 5 May 1993 in Bolton, Greater Manchester. In 2016, Potts joined the cast of the ITV2 reality television series Ibiza Weekender. He joined during the show's fifth series as assistant head rep, alongside Ellie Young. He later returned and became head rep from the sixth series onwards. In February 2019, Potts appeared in a celebrity episode of Dinner Date, where he went on dates with three different men. The following week he began appearing on the sixth series of the E4 dating series Celebs Go Dating.

In September 2019, Potts was a contestant on the second series of the 5Star farming reality series, Celebs on the Farm in which he finished as the runner-up. In July 2020, Potts competed in the first series of Celebrity Karaoke Club on ITV2. He finished as the runner-up, losing out to Scarlett Moffatt. In October 2021, Potts was a contestant on Celebrity Ghost Trip, the Halloween spin-off of Celebrity Coach Trip, alongside his Ibiza Weekender co-star, Callum Izzard. They reached the final day and finished in fourth place. In 2022, he appeared as a contestant on the ITV2 reality series Apocalypse Wow.

Potts has also made several guest appearances on shows such as CelebAbility, Hey Tracey!, Home Alone with Joel Dommett and also hosted the spin-off episode of The Cabins on ITV2. In March 2024, Potts was a housemate on the twenty-third series of Celebrity Big Brother. After 19 days, he was voted as the winner of the series. In September 2025, Potts was announced to appear in the seventh series of RuPaul's Drag Race UK as a special celebrity guest during a makeover challenge (episode "The Hun Makeover").

== Filmography ==
Year	Title	Note	Ref(s)
2016–2020	Ibiza Weekender	Head rep	
2019	Celebrity Dinner Date	1 episode	
2019	Celebs Go Dating	Cast member	
2019, 2021	CelebAbility	2 episodes	
2019	Celebs on the Farm	Contestant; runner-up	
2020	Home Alone with Joel Dommett	Guest appearance	
2020	Celebrity Karaoke Club	Contestant; runner-up	
2020	Hey Tracey!	Contestant	
2021	Celebrity Ghost Trip	Contestant	
2021–2022	The Cabins	Spin-off presenter	
2022	Apocalypse Wow	Contestant	
2023	Kavos Weekender	Head rep	
2023–2025	Big Brother: Late & Live	Guest	
2024	Celebrity Big Brother	Winner; Series 23	
2024	Pointless Celebrities	Contestant	
2025	Olivia Attwood's Bad Boyfriends	Himself	
2025	RuPaul's Drag Race UK	Special guest; Series 7, episode "The Hun Makeover"	
2026	Celebs Go Dating	Cast member; Series 15	

Preceded by Ryan Thomas	Celebrity Big Brother UK winner Series 23 (2024)	Succeeded by Jack P. Shepherd
