= Celeb Cooking School =

British television series

- Genre: Reality
- Presented by: Melvin Odoom
- Judges: Giorgio Locatelli (series 1–2); Poppy O'Toole (series 1)
- Country of origin: United Kingdom
- Original language: English
- No. of series: 2
- No. of episodes: 16

Production
- Executive producers: Meredith Chambers; Martin Oxley
- Running time: 60 minutes (inc. adverts)
- Production companies: Electric Ray (series 1); Sony Pictures Television (series 2); RDF Television (series 2); GroupM Motion Entertainment

Original release
- Network: E4
- Release: 5 September 2022 – 18 January 2024

Celeb Cooking School is a British cooking reality show that aired on E4 from 5 September 2022 to 18 January 2024. The series features a line-up of celebrities who are self-proclaimed "horrendous" home cooks. It is presented by Melvin Odoom and judged by Giorgio Locatelli and was developed by Jack Foster.

== Production ==
In November 2021, Channel 4 announced the commissioning of Celeb Cooking School, and described the series as a group of "self-confessed, oven-shy celebs [being dropped] into the dining deep end" as they "embark on a culinary course like no other". In May 2022, Melvin Odoom was confirmed to be presenting the series, with chef Giorgio Locatelli and his aide Poppy O'Toole announced as judges. In October 2024, it was announced that Celeb Cooking School would not be returning.

== Format ==
The celebrities take on an intensive cookery crash course, which sees them cook solo and subsequently in pairs. They are tasked with mastering crucial cookery techniques, and are judged by chef Giorgio Locatelli and his aide Poppy O'Toole, who decide with celebrity is eliminated each week and has to leave the school for good, before ultimately deciding who is crowned "Best in Class" at the end of the series.

== Series overview ==
No.	Episodes	Premiere date	Finale date	Contestants	Winner	Runner-up
1	8	5 September 2022	27 September 2022	10	Laura Tott	Toby Aromolaran
2	8	8 January 2024	18 January 2024	10	Blu Hydrangea	James "Arg" Argent

=== Series 1 (2022) ===
The line-up of celebrities competing in the first series were announced on 15 February 2022.

Celebrity	Known for	Status
Kim Woodburn	Television personality & expert cleaner	Eliminated 1st on 5 September 2022
Shaun Ryder	Happy Mondays singer	Eliminated 2nd on 6 September 2022
Paul Chowdhry	Comedian & actor	Eliminated 3rd on 12 September 2022
Stevo the Madman	Internet personality & former footballer	Eliminated 4th on 13 September 2022
Zeze Millz	Television presenter	Eliminated 5th on 19 September 2022
Sam Thompson	Made in Chelsea cast member	Eliminated 6th on 20 September 2022
Maeva D'Ascanio	Made in Chelsea cast member	Eliminated 7th on 26 September 2022
Kerry Katona	Atomic Kitten singer & television personality	Third place on 27 September 2022
Toby Aromolaran	Love Island contestant	Runner-up on 27 September 2022
Laura Tott	First Dates waitress	Winner on 27 September 2022

=== Series 2 (2024) ===
In February 2023, it was announced that the show would return for a second series. Danniella Westbrook was approached but turned it down, whilst Katie Price signed up to appear on the show but quit prior to filming. Poppy O'Toole does not appear in this series.

Celebrity	Known for	Status
Ann Widdecombe	Conservative Party politician	Eliminated 1st on 8 January 2024
Olivia Bentley	Made in Chelsea cast member	Eliminated 2nd on 9 January 2024
Nancy Dell'Olio	Lawyer & media personality	Eliminated 3rd on 11 January 2024
Scotty T	Geordie Shore cast member	Eliminated 4th on 11 January 2024
Spuddz	Comedian & internet personality	Eliminated 5th on 15 January 2024
Louie Spence	Dancer & television personality	Eliminated 6th on 16 January 2024
Nadia Rose	Rapper	Eliminated 7th on 17 January 2024
Ruth Codd	Actress	Third place on 18 January 2024
James "Arg" Argent	The Only Way Is Essex cast member	Runner-up on 18 January 2024
Blu Hydrangea	RuPaul's Drag Race UK contestant	Winner on 18 January 2024
