= Kavos Weekender =

British television series

- Also known as: The Magaluf Weekender (2013–2014); Ibiza Weekender (2015–2020)
- Genre: Reality television
- Created by: Andrew MacKenzie; David Clews; Matt Pritchard; Jonny Coller; Tom O'Brien; Hamish Fergusson; Gemma Kirby Davies
- Written by: Dom English
- Starring: Full cast list
- Narrated by: Joe Lycett (2013–19); Tom Rosenthal (2020, 2023)
- Country of origin: Spain
- Original language: English
- No. of series: 10
- No. of episodes: 83

Production
- Producers: Simon Cooper; Rob Lewis; Tom O'Brien; Gyles Neville; Melanie Darlaston
- Running time: 60 mins (inc. adverts)
- Production companies: Twofour and Motion Content Group

Original release
- Network: ITV2
- Release: 6 January 2013 – 7 March 2023

Kavos Weekender is a British reality television series that premiered on ITV2 on 6 January 2013. The series follows a group of 18–24 year olds spending a weekend at a hotel resort. From series 1–3, it was titled The Magaluf Weekender, and was located at Lively Hotel in Magaluf. In 2015, for the fourth series, production was relocated to Ryans Ibiza Apartments, on the island of Ibiza, Spain, and the series was renamed Ibiza Weekender. In 2022, production was relocated to the Morfeas Hotel, Kavos for the tenth series, and the series was renamed Kavos Weekender.

== Overview ==
Each week, the show follows two different sets of young friends. For some, this is their first holiday without their parents. In The Magaluf Weekender, guests checked into Lively Hotel, a holiday resort on the island of Mallorca, with their friends for three days. The hotel rigged cameras to film every aspect of their holiday in a Big Brother-style of filming. In Series 2, cameras were installed in the bedrooms. The final reps of The Magaluf Weekender were Imogen, Jordan, Ali and Tobi.

In 2015, the show relocated to Ibiza for Series 4 and became Ibiza Weekender, despite following a similar format to the previous version of the programme. Imogen returned in Episode 1, with Jordan returning in Episode 3. The remaining rep positions were covered by new reps.

== Cast ==
Key
Head rep
Assistant head rep
Rep
Intern
Guest or Guest Starred
Did not appear

| | Series | | | | | | | | | | |
| | Series 1 | Series 2 | Series 3 | Series 4 | Series 5 | Series 6 | Series 7 | Boat Party | Series 8 | Series 9 | Series 10 |
|---|---|---|---|---|---|---|---|---|---|---|---|
| David Potts | | | | | | | | | | | |
| Jordan Davies | | | | | | | | | | | |
| Tasha Kiran | | | | | | | | | | | |
| Ethan Aveiro | | | | | | | | | | | |
| Jaegia Magro | | | | | | | | | | | |
| Lucy Appleton | | | | | | | | | | | |
| Joel Frimpong | | | | | | | | | | | |
| Tyler D'cruz | | | | | | | | | | | |
| Imogen Townley | | | | | | | | | | | |
| Jaime-Leigh Paley | | | | | | | | | | | |
| Brett Hamilton | | | | | | | | | | | |
| Tobi Jasicki | | | | | | | | | | | |
| Ali Crowley | | | | | | | | | | | |
| Deano Baily | | | | | | | | | | | |
| Rachael Rhodes | | | | | | | | | | | |
| Kris Skinner | | | | | | | | | | | |
| Ben Smith | | | | | | | | | | | |
| Sophie Newton | | | | | | | | | | | |
| Ellie Young | | | | | | | | | | | |
| Amelia Bath | | | | | | | | | | | |
| Craig Dalton | | | | | | | | | | | |
| Hayley Fanshaw | | | | | | | | | | | |
| Laura Louise | | | | | | | | | | | |
| Rykard Jenkins | | | | | | | | | | | |
| Bethan Kershaw | | | | | | | | | | | |
| Callum Izzard | | | | | | | | | | | |
| Marlie Lewis | | | | | | | | | | | |
| Chyna Ellis | | | | | | | | | | | |
| Molly Davies | | | | | | | | | | | |
| Austin Eary | | | | | | | | | | | |
| Jackson Kneeshaw | | | | | | | | | | | |
| Charlotte Hughes | | | | | | | | | | | |
| Isobel Mills | | | | | | | | | | | |
| Savvas Georgiou | | | | | | | | | | | |
| Chloe Chaloner | | | | | | | | | | | |
| Nicola Jane | | | | | | | | | | | |
| Riva Vatzaloo | | | | | | | | | | | |
| Jaden Richards | | | | | | | | | | | |

=== Other appearances ===
As well as appearing in Ibiza Weekender, some of the cast members have competed in other reality TV shows including Big Brother. Charlotte Hughes and Bethan Kershaw also appeared on Ex on the Beach and Geordie Shore respectively. David Potts and Callum Izzard both made appearances on dating show Celebs Go Dating.

- Big Brother
  - Ellie Young – Series 18 (2017) – Evicted
  - Tom Bryant - Series 20 (2023) - Evicted
- Celebrity Big Brother
  - Jordan Davies – Series 20 (2017) – Evicted
  - David Potts – Series 23 (2024) – Winner

== Episodes ==
| Series | Episodes | Originally released | | Average viewers |
| Series | Episodes | First released | Last released | Average viewers |
|---|---|---|---|---|
| 1 | 6 | 6 January 2013 | 10 February 2013 | 652,000 |
| 2 | 6 | 17 September 2013 | 22 October 2013 | 884,000 |
| 3 | 6 | 5 January 2014 | 9 February 2014 | 635,000 |
| 4 | 8 | 8 February 2015 | 29 March 2015 | 502,000 |
| 5 | 8 | 7 February 2016 | 27 March 2016 | 565,000 |
| 6 | 9 | 5 February 2017 | 2 April 2017 | 602,000 |
| 7 | 10 | 7 January 2018 | 18 March 2018 | 849,000 |
| 8 | 10 | 6 January 2019 | 10 March 2019 | 814,000 |
| 9 | 10 | 19 January 2020 | 29 March 2020 | 463,557 |
| 10 | 10 | 3 January 2023 | 7 March 2023 | TBA |

=== Series 1 (2013) ===
Series 1 began airing on ITV2 on 6 January 2013. Series 1 was filmed in the summer of 2012. Brett was Head Rep. Imogen, Jaime-Leigh and Jordan served as reps.

| No. overall | No. in series | Title | Original release date | Viewing figures |
|---|---|---|---|---|
| 1 | 1 | "Episode 1" | 6 January 2013 | 632,000 |
| 2 | 2 | "Episode 2" | 13 January 2013 | 614,000 |
| 3 | 3 | "Episode 3" | 20 January 2013 | 648,000 |
| 4 | 4 | "Episode 4" | 27 January 2013 | 607,000 |
| 5 | 5 | "Episode 5" | 3 February 2013 | 802,000 |
| 6 | 6 | "Episode 6" | 10 February 2013 | 611,000 |

=== Series 2 (2013) ===
On 4 September 2013, it was announced that The Magaluf Weekender would return for its second series on 17 September. Series 2 was filmed in the summer of 2013. Imogen, Jaime-Leigh and Jordan returned as reps. They were joined by new rep Tobi following the departure of Brett.

| No. overall | No. in series | Title | Original release date | Viewing figures |
|---|---|---|---|---|
| 7 | 1 | "Episode 7" | 17 September 2013 | 916,000 |
| 8 | 2 | "Episode 8" | 24 September 2013 | 840,000 |
| 9 | 3 | "Episode 9" | 1 October 2013 | 820,000 |
| 10 | 4 | "Episode 10" | 8 October 2013 | 875,000 |
| 11 | 5 | "Episode 11" | 15 October 2013 | 900,000 |
| 12 | 6 | "Episode 12" | 22 October 2013 | 955,000 |

=== Series 3 (2014) ===
Series 3 began on 5 January 2014. It was the third and final edition of The Magaluf Weekender. Series 3 was filmed in the summer of 2013 after the completion of Series 2. Imogen, Jordan and Tobi returned as reps. Jaime-Leigh departed in the Series 2 finale and was replaced by Ali.

| No. overall | No. in series | Title | Original release date | Viewing figures |
|---|---|---|---|---|
| 13 | 1 | "Episode 13" | 5 January 2014 | 681,000 |
| 14 | 2 | "Episode 14" | 12 January 2014 | 481,000 |
| 15 | 3 | "Episode 15" | 19 January 2014 | 426,000 |
| 16 | 4 | "Episode 16" | 26 January 2014 | 742,000 |
| 17 | 5 | "Episode 17" | 2 February 2014 | 844,000 |
| 18 | 6 | "Episode 18" | 9 February 2014 | 634,000 |

=== Series 4 (2015) ===
Series 4, transmitted from 8 February 2015, relocated to Ibiza, and was hence renamed Ibiza Weekender. Imogen became Head Rep in the new series and was joined by new reps Deano, Ben, Kris, Rachael and Sophie. Jordan, now also taking part in the show Ex on the Beach, returned as a rep in Episode 3. Rachael replaced Imogen as Head Rep when she stood down from the role. The lowest viewing figure that the show has ever had was recorded on Episode 1, most likely due to the renaming of the show and lack of public awareness.

| No. overall | No. in series | Title | Original release date | Viewing figures |
|---|---|---|---|---|
| 19 | 1 | "Episode 19" | 8 February 2015 | 370,000 |
| 20 | 2 | "Episode 20" | 15 February 2015 | 447,000 |
| 21 | 3 | "Episode 21" | 22 February 2015 | 675,000 |
| 22 | 4 | "Episode 22" | 1 March 2015 | 584,000 |
| 23 | 5 | "Episode 23" | 8 March 2015 | 455,000 |
| 24 | 6 | "Episode 24" | 15 March 2015 | 542,000 |
| 25 | 7 | "Episode 25" | 22 March 2015 | 496,000 |
| 26 | 8 | "Episode 26" | 29 March 2015 | 445,000 |

=== Series 5 (2016) ===
Series 5 began airing on 7 February 2016. It is the second edition of Ibiza Weekender. Deano and Jordan returned in Episode 1, with Imogen making a full return in Episode 2. New reps Amelia, David and Ellie joined the show. This series, Jordan replaced Rachael as Head Rep. Deano replaced Jordan as Head Rep after his departure and David was given Assistant Head Rep. Craig joined to replace Jordan in Episode 6.

| No. overall | No. in series | Title | Original release date | Viewing figures |
|---|---|---|---|---|
| 27 | 1 | "Episode 27" | 7 February 2016 | 508,000 |
| 28 | 2 | "Episode 28" | 14 February 2016 | 544,000 |
| 29 | 3 | "Episode 29" | 21 February 2016 | 578,000 |
| 30 | 4 | "Episode 30" | 28 February 2016 | 545,000 |
| 31 | 5 | "Episode 31" | 6 March 2016 | 640,000 |
| 32 | 6 | "Episode 32" | 13 March 2016 | 631,000 |
| 33 | 7 | "Episode 33" | 20 March 2016 | 584,000 |
| 34 | 8 | "Episode 34" | 27 March 2016 | 487,000 |

=== Series 6 (2017) ===
Series 6 began airing on 5 February 2017. It is the third edition of Ibiza Weekender. David returned and became Head Rep, replacing Deano who was the existing Head Rep from Series 5. Imogen and Deano also returned to the show in Episode 1, and were joined by new reps Laura and Hayley. Jordan returned later on in Episode 1 and was chosen by David to take on the role of Assistant Head Rep. Rykard, a contestant on ITV2's Love Island, joined the show as the seventh rep. Jordan became Acting Head Rep throughout Episodes 2 and 3 after David fell ill until he recovered and returned to his role in Episode 4. Following ongoing friction within the team, David demoted Jordan from Assistant Head Rep in Episode 4. Also, Laura was removed from the team in Episode 4 for failing to acknowledge the consequences of her actions. Episode 5 saw the return of Ellie Young, a rep who left the show in Series 5, who David chose to replace Laura and become the new Assistant Head Rep. However, Rykard decided to leave in Episode 5 after he didn't feel comfortable working as a rep. In Episode 7, Bethan joined the show as a rep to replace Rykard after starring as a guest in Episode 1 of the series – whilst Ellie was made Acting Head Rep after the other reps failed to respect her authority. David chose Imogen to replace Ellie as Assistant Head Rep in Episode 8 after her irresponsible behaviour. During the series finale, Imogen and Deano both announced that they were stepping down from the show to go travelling together, however, Deano returned to the show in Series 7.

| No. overall | No. in series | Title | Original release date | Viewing figures |
|---|---|---|---|---|
| 35 | 1 | "Ibiza Weekender XXL^{3}" | 5 February 2017 | 468,000 |
| 36 | 2 | "Episode 36" | 12 February 2017 | 503,000 |
| 37 | 3 | "Episode 37" | 19 February 2017 | 559,000 |
| 38 | 4 | "Episode 38" | 26 February 2017 | 622,000 |
| 39 | 5 | "Episode 39" | 5 March 2017 | 655,000 |
| 40 | 6 | "Episode 40" | 12 March 2017 | 604,000 |
| 41 | 7 | "Episode 41" | 19 March 2017 | 705,000 |
| 42 | 8 | "Episode 42" | 26 March 2017 | 670,000 |
| 43 | 9 | "Episode 43" | 2 April 2017 | 628,000 |

=== Series 7 (2018) ===
On 24 July 2017, it was confirmed that the Weekender brand will return for a seventh series that will air in 2018. It is the fourth edition of Ibiza Weekender. The series is the first to front the new logo. David, Jordan and Deano returned and the first episode aired on 7 January 2018 on ITV2. Love Island's Chyna Ellis joined as a new rep alongside Marlie and Molly. During the series premiere, Head Rep David outlined the new points system which grades the reps based on the quality of their work. Once all of the points have been reviewed, David chooses a 'Rep of the Week'. In Episode 2, new rep Callum joined the series, whilst Deano made his last appearance. In Episode 6, the reps voted which rep they believed did not deserve to stay on the team. Marlie received the most votes and was removed. In Episode 7, Marlie was replaced by Austin. Hayley returned in Episode 8 after starring as a rep in Series 6. David made Callum his Assistant Head Rep in Episode 8. After an eventful weekend, Jordan was removed from the show in Episode 9 but made a guest appearance in the series finale. Also, Chyna decided to leave with Jordan in final episode of the series.

| No. overall | No. in series | Title | Original release date | Viewing figures |
|---|---|---|---|---|
| 44 | 1 | "Episode 44" | 7 January 2018 | 845,000 |
| 45 | 2 | "Episode 45" | 14 January 2018 | 791,000 |
| 46 | 3 | "Episode 46" | 21 January 2018 | 672,000 |
| 47 | 4 | "Episode 47" | 28 January 2018 | 803,000 |
| 48 | 5 | "Episode 48" | 4 February 2018 | 876,000 |
| 49 | 6 | "Episode 49" | 18 February 2018 | 904,000 |
| 50 | 7 | "Episode 50" | 25 February 2018 | 905,000 |
| 51 | 8 | "Episode 51" | 4 March 2018 | 939,000 |
| 52 | 9 | "Episode 52" | 11 March 2018 | 811,000 |
| 53 | 10 | "Episode 53" | 18 March 2018 | 947,000 |

=== Series 8 (2019) ===
In April 2018, ITV2 confirmed that Ibiza Weekender would return for two more series. The eighth series began on 6 January 2019 and concluded on 10 March.

| No. overall | No. in series | Title | Original release date | Viewing figures |
|---|---|---|---|---|
| 54 | 1 | "Episode 54" | 6 January 2019 | 794,000 |
| 55 | 2 | "Episode 55" | 13 January 2019 | 956,000 |
| 56 | 3 | "Episode 56" | 20 January 2019 | 793,000 |
| 57 | 4 | "Episode 57" | 27 January 2019 | 737,000 |
| 58 | 5 | "Episode 58" | 3 February 2019 | 782,000 |
| 59 | 6 | "Episode 59" | 10 February 2019 | 775,000 |
| 60 | 7 | "Episode 60" | 17 February 2019 | 814,000 |
| 61 | 8 | "Episode 61" | 24 February 2019 | 877,000 |
| 62 | 9 | "Episode 62" | 3 March 2019 | 800,000 |
| 63 | 10 | "Episode 63" | 10 March 2019 | 813,000 |

=== Series 9 (2020) ===
Head Rep David returns alongside newly promoted Guest Satisfaction Manager Jordan, Callum, Chloe and Tash. Joining them are new Reps Riva and Jaden. This series also seen the introduction of new Narrator, Tom Rosenthal who took over from Joe Lycett. During the course of the series, Jordan once more became Acting Head Rep after David Potts was incapacitated in a freak waterslide accident. The final episode of the series sees the departure of the only remaining original rep from Series 1, Jordan.

| No. overall | No. in series | Title | Original release date | Viewing figures |
|---|---|---|---|---|
| 64 | 1 | "Episode 64" | 19 January 2020 | 366,658 |
| 65 | 2 | "Episode 65" | 26 January 2020 | N/A |
| 66 | 3 | "Episode 66" | 2 February 2020 | 655,536 |
| 67 | 5 | "Episode 67" | 9 February 2020 | 266,664 |
| 68 | 6 | "Episode 68" | 16 February 2020 | N/A |
| 69 | 6 | "Episode 69" | 1 March 2020 | N/A |
| 70 | 7 | "Episode 70" | 8 March 2020 | N/A |
| 71 | 8 | "Episode 71" | 15 March 2020 | 429,000 |
| 72 | 9 | "Episode 72" | 22 March 2020 | N/A |
| 73 | 10 | "Episode 73" | 29 March 2020 | N/A |

== Reception ==
On 13 January 2013, The Magaluf Weekender was the second most tweeted about show of the day, inspiring over 29,000 tweets.

Reveal magazine rated the show positively, saying: "Unlike the semi-scripted formats of shows such as TOWIE, Geordie Shore and Made in Chelsea, this unique series captures the true, unguarded moments of these young adults by using rigged cameras to film every aspect of their holiday in a Big Brother style of filming."

The show never held first place for the most viewed programme on ITV2 for any week as The Magaluf Weekender. However, on 26 February 2017, Ibiza Weekender became the most viewed programme of the week on ITV2 and ITV2 +1 for the first time in the show's history with 622,000 viewers, although this isn't the highest number of viewers that the show has attracted. The show has also held the top position for ITV2 for two other episodes in its history.

== Awards and nominations ==
| Year | Show | Award | Category | Result | Ref. |
|---|---|---|---|---|---|
| 2013 | The Magaluf Weekender | National Reality Television Awards | Best Docu-Soap | Nominated | |
| 2013 | The Magaluf Weekender | National Reality Television Awards | Best Social Experiment Show | Won | |
| 2018 | Ibiza Weekender | National Reality Television Awards | Best Reality non competition show | Won | |
| 2018 | Ibiza Weekender | National Reality Television Awards | Best Male Personality - David Potts | Won | |
| 2019 | Ibiza Weekender | National Reality Television Awards | Best Reality non competition show | Won | |
| 2019 | Ibiza Weekender | National Reality Television Awards | Best Entertainment show | Nominated | |
| 2019 | Ibiza Weekender | National Reality Television Awards | Best Male Personality - Jordan Davies | Won | |
| 2019 | Ibiza Weekender | National Reality Television Awards | Best Male Personality - Callum Izzard | Nominated | |
| 2019 | Ibiza Weekender | National Reality Television Awards | Best Female Personality - Isobel Mills | Nominated | |

== Notes ==
- ^Note 1: They have served as a former/current Head Rep.
- ^Note 2: Series 5, Episode 3: Former rep Rachael Rhodes starred as a guest on this episode as she attempted to reconcile with Jordan.
- ^Note 3: Series 6, Episode 1: On 5 February 2017, the series premiere had a running time of 90 minutes, including advertisements, instead of 60 minutes. This episode was titled Ibiza Weekender XXL.
- ^Note 4: Series 6, Episode 7: Bethan made her first appearance as a rep, but has returned to the show after starring as a guest on Episode 1 of the series.
- ^Note 5: Series 7, Episode 10: Jordan made a guest appearance to visit Chyna after being removed as a rep in the previous episode.
