= Dinner Date =

British dating game show

- Genre: Dating game show
- Created by: Joseph Varley & Jimmy Baker
- Narrated by: Charlotte Hudson (2010–12); Natalie Casey (2014–2023)
- Country of origin: United Kingdom
- Original language: English
- No. of series: 12
- No. of episodes: 302

Production
- Running time: 60 minutes (inc. adverts)
- Production company: Hat Trick Productions

Original release
- Network: ITV (2010–12); ITVBe (2014–2023)
- Release: 9 August 2010 – 4 June 2023

Dinner Date is a British dating game show, which first aired on ITV from 9 August 2010 to 28 December 2012, with subsequent new series airing on sister channel ITVBe from 8 October 2014 to 4 June 2023. The programme format was created by Jimmy Baker and Joseph Varley. The programme makes up a significant proportion of ITVBe's output, with several repeats airing daily. New-to-air episodes are generally scheduled on a weekly basis, although some episodes from the fifth series were stripped daily across weeknights.

== Premise ==
The show involves a man or woman guest going for dinner at three different people's houses on consecutive nights. The dates are chosen at the start of the episode, when the dater chooses their three blind dates by going through five different three-course menus or a replacement date if he or she falls ill. The hosts are shown preparing a meal, usually some kind of interesting dish, and then the guest arrives. Afterward each host gives ratings of the guest, but then it is up to the guest to subsequently choose which of them they would like to go on a date to a restaurant with. The two losing contestants are given ready meals to be eaten at home. At the end of the show, the viewers are told whether they are still dating or not. Sometimes updates of the romantic lives of the two unpicked hosts are given as well.

== International versions ==
The UK version of Dinner Date broadcasts in over 20 countries, including; Australia, Belgium, Bosnia, Denmark, Finland, Germany, Hong Kong and Taiwan, Hungary, Iceland, India, Ireland, Israel, Italy, Macedonia, Montenegro, Netherlands, New Zealand, Norway, Poland, South Africa, Serbia and Sweden.

There was also an Australian version of Dinner Date which aired on the Seven Network in 2011 hosted by Manu Feildel and a South African version of the show. Since 2020 there is also a German version of the show aired on ZDF Neo.

== Transmissions ==
Series	Start date	End date	Episodes
1	9 August 2010	26 November 2010	30
2	20 June 2011	29 July 2011	30
3	15 April 2012	28 December 2012	40
4	8 October 2014	29 April 2015	31
5	12 August 2015	25 March 2016	26
6	11 May 2016	14 December 2016	26
7	1 February 2017	13 December 2017	26
8	28 February 2018	12 December 2018	26
9	24 October 2018	11 December 2019	29
10	8 April 2020	9 December 2020	26
11	13 December 2021	6 April 2022	26
12	14 December 2022	4 June 2023	26
