= Queen MoJo =

English television personality and dancer

- Born: Josephine Hanu D Morondiya; 4 November 1992 (age 33); Southwark, London, England
- Occupations: Television personality; dancer
- Years active: 2021–present
- Television: Peckham's Finest; Celebrity Karaoke Club; Celebrity MasterChef

Josephine Hanu D Morondiya (born 4 November 1992), known professionally as Queen MoJo, is an English television personality and dancer. In 2021, she appeared in the ITV2 reality series Peckham's Finest. In 2022, she appeared as a contestant on Celebrity Karaoke Club and Celebrity MasterChef.

== Life and career ==
Queen MoJo was born Josephine Hanu D Morondiya on 4 November 1992 in Southwark, London. She is of Nigerian descent. MoJo is a dancer, and she has performed on stage at Glastonbury Festival with Lizzo, and has appeared in music videos for John Legend and Wiley. In 2021, she starred in The Body Fights Back, a documentary that investigated diet culture, body image and eating disorders with MoJo sharing her own experiences. The same year, she appeared in the ITV2 reality series Peckham's Finest, which follows the lives of a group of people who live in Peckham. At the time of appearing on the show, she worked as a shop assistant and as a body confidence coach on social media. She also appeared on Good Morning Britain, debating with Miss Great Britain winner Jen Atkin on whether it was acceptable for someone to be "dumped for gaining weight".

In June 2022, MoJo appeared as a contestant on the third series of Celebrity Karaoke Club. She entered the club on the fifth day alongside internet personality Arron Crascall. After singing Nicki Minaj's "Anaconda", she was voted karaoke champion of the night, advancing to the final day. In the final, she sang "Never Too Much" by Luther Vandross and a duet of "Umbrella" with Kaz Kamwi. MoJo was then eliminated from the competition, finishing in joint third place with Bobby Norris. In August 2022, MoJo began competing in the seventeenth series of Celebrity MasterChef. She competed in the second heat alongside Melanie Blatt, Chris Eubank, Gareth Malone and Cliff Parisi. She was the first to be eliminated from the competition after her food was criticised for being undercooked.

== Filmography ==
As herself
Year	Title	Notes	Ref.
2021	The Body Fights Back	Documentary	
2021	Peckham's Finest	Main role	
2021	Good Morning Britain	Guest	
2022	Celebrity Karaoke Club	Contestant; series 3	
2022	Celebrity MasterChef	Contestant; series 17	
