= Verona Rose =

English actress, comedian and television presenter

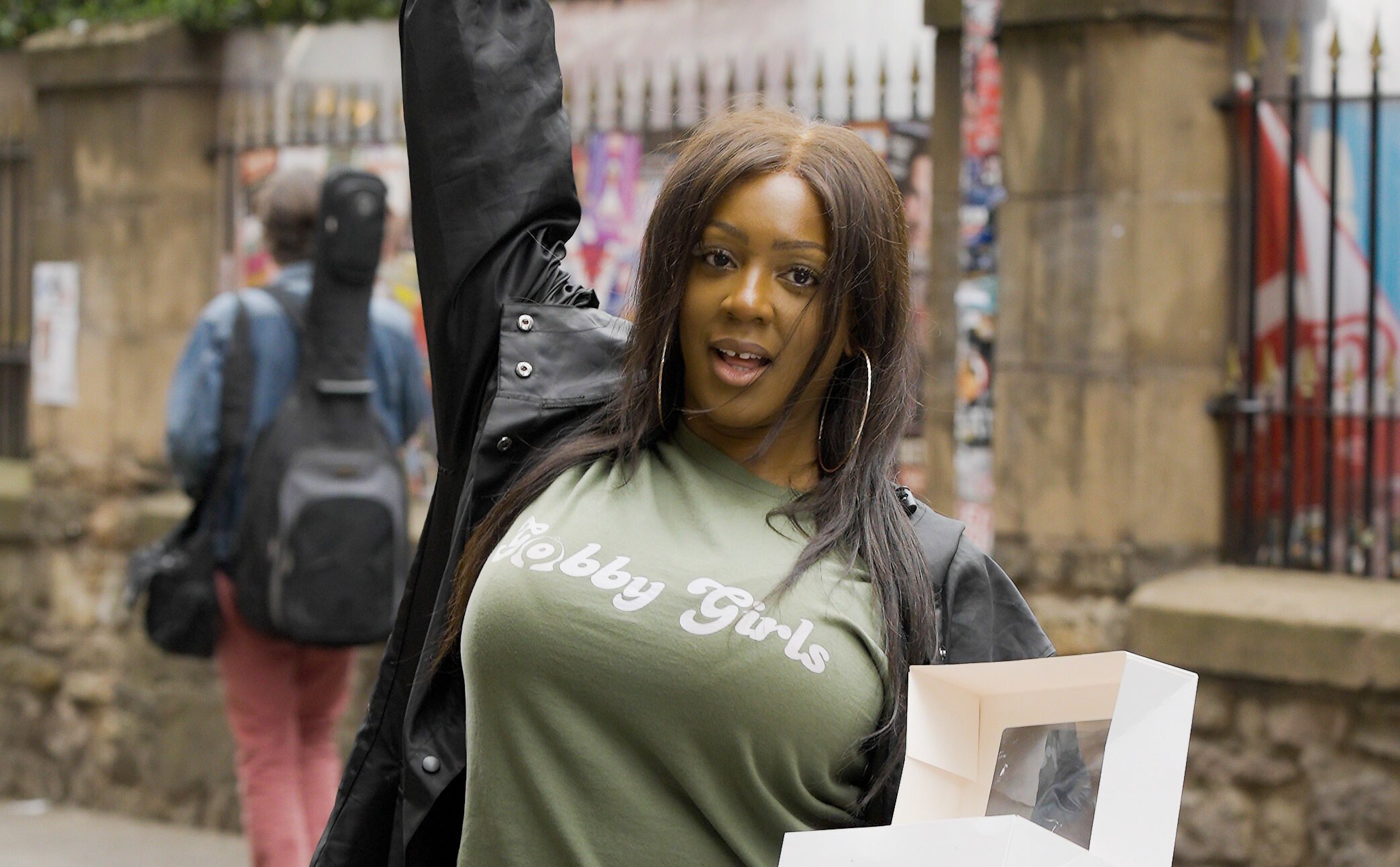
- Born: Catherine Verona Gordon; 21 November 1984 (age 41); Southampton, Hampshire, England
- Occupations: Actress; comedian; television presenter; writer
- Years active: 2010–present

Catherine Verona Gordon (born 21 November 1984), known professionally as Verona Rose, is an English actress, comedian, television presenter and writer. She is known for writing and starring in various comedy series and for presenting the dating series Secret Crush on ITV2. She is also a regular fixture on British panel shows and was a contestant on the E4 series The Real Dirty Dancing in 2022.

== Life and career ==
Rose was born Catherine Verona Gordon on 21 November 1984 in Southampton, Hampshire. She is the sister of Tyrone Gordon, a rapper from Southampton. She studied theatre at the BRIT School and then at Brunel University before returning to her old secondary school in Southampton to cover drama. She made her acting debut in the 2010 online web series Pini as Olive, and the following year, Rose appeared in an episode of Doctors as Alexandria. Over the next few years of her career, Rose portrayed minor roles and appeared as an extra in various television series and short films including Hustle and EastEnders. In 2019, she co-wrote and starred in the web series Dick in Ibiza and Fully Blown alongside Donna Preston, and the pair also appeared on the Channel 4 series Pants on Fire together. She also starred in the series Infatuation - Island of Love. In 2020, Rose played various characters in sketch scenes for The Emily Atack Show and also appeared as a guest on Hey Tracey!.

In 2021, Rose began presenting the dating series Secret Crush on ITV2. The same year, Rose joined the Celebs to record a cover of the Beatles classic "Let It Be", a song produced by Grahame and Jack Corbyn assisted by Stephen Large. The song was recorded at Metropolis Studios, in support of Mind, and released on 3 December 2021 by Saga Entertainment. Rose was part of a choir of celebrities including Georgia Hirst, Ivan Kaye, Anne Hegerty and Eunice Olumide who were backing EastEnders star Shona McGarty. She also appeared as various characters in the CBBC series Horrible Histories. In 2022, Rose competed as a contestant on the E4 reality series The Real Dirty Dancing and began appearing regularly on the comedy series Dating No Filter. She also portrayed Mogs in the Dave series Sneakerhead and appeared as Naomi in the fourth series of Netflix crime drama Top Boy. Rose also made guest appearances on Celebrity Juice and CelebAbility and is also appeared in the film Finding Forever. In June 2022, Rose appeared on an episode of Pointless Celebrities alongside Bobby Seagull. They won the jackpot and Rose donated her money to the British Thyroid Foundation. In September 2022, Rose rejoined The Celebs alongside Jo O'Meara and Anne Hegerty to mark the 40th anniversary of the Michael Jackson classic album Thriller and raise money for Great Ormond Street Hospital, with a new rendition of the title track, which was released on the independent record label Saga Entertainment and produced by Grahame and Jack Corbyn.

== Filmography ==
Key
†	Denotes works that have not yet been released

Year	Title	Role	Notes	Ref.
2010	Pini	Olive	Web series; 2 episodes	
2011	Doctors	Alexandria	Episode: "Gotcha!"	
2012	Hustle	Girl at bar	Episode: "Ding Dong That's My Song"	
2014	The Method of Love	Club extra	Film	
2014	Wasteman Diaries	Keisha	Short film	
2014	Clap!	Amy	Short film	
2014	EastEnders	Vee	2 episodes	
2016	More Strange than True	Moth	Film	
2016–2017	Forbidden Truth	Andrea	Television mini-series	
2017	Our Little Haven	Vivian	Film	
2018	Baby Shower	Verona	Film	
2019	Dick in Ibiza	Keisha	Web series; also writer	
2019	Fully Blown	Gap C	3 episodes; also writer	
2019	Pants on Fire	Herself	Contestant	
2019	The Joy of Missing Out	Doctor	Episode: "Sam and the Case of Mistaken Identity"	
2020	Infatuation - Island of Love	Jaade	Series regular	
2020	Tuesday Afternoon Kitchen	Herself	Guest	
2020	The Emily Atack Show	Various	2 episodes	
2020	Tinder Date Chronicles	Herself	Guest; 1 episode	
2020	Loves Spell	Charmaine	Film	
2020	Hey Tracey!	Herself	Guest; 1 episode	
2020	Toys That Made Christmas Great	Herself	Documentary	
2020	8 Out of 10 Cats	Herself	Guest panellist; 1 episode	
2021	The B@it	Unknown	Episode: "This Man Pays to be Treated like a Kebab"	
2021–present	Secret Crush	Herself	Presenter	
2021	Horrible Histories	Various	2 episodes	
2021	Sorry, I Didn't Know	Herself	Guest panellist	
2021	Britain's Favourite Toys	Herself	Documentary	
2021–present	Dating No Filter	Herself	Regular guest	
2022	Top Boy	Naomi	Recurring cast	
2022	Sneakerhead	Mogs	1 episode	
2022	The Real Dirty Dancing	Herself	Contestant	
2022	Celebrity Juice	Herself	Guest panellist; 1 episode	
2022	CelebAbility	Herself	Guest panellist; 1 episode	
2022	Pointless Celebrities	Herself	Contestant	
2022	Married at First Sight: Unveiled	Herself	Guest	
2022	Finding Forever	Leonie	Film	
2023	Murder Ballads: How to Make It in Rock 'n' Roll	Dionne	Film	
2023	Office Royale	Jo	Short film	
2024	Frenemies	Verona	Short film	
2025	Fairchecks	Amie	Short film	
2025	The Re-Education of Brianca Brixton	Brianca Brixton	Film	
