= Lizzie Cundy =

English television presenter (born 1963)

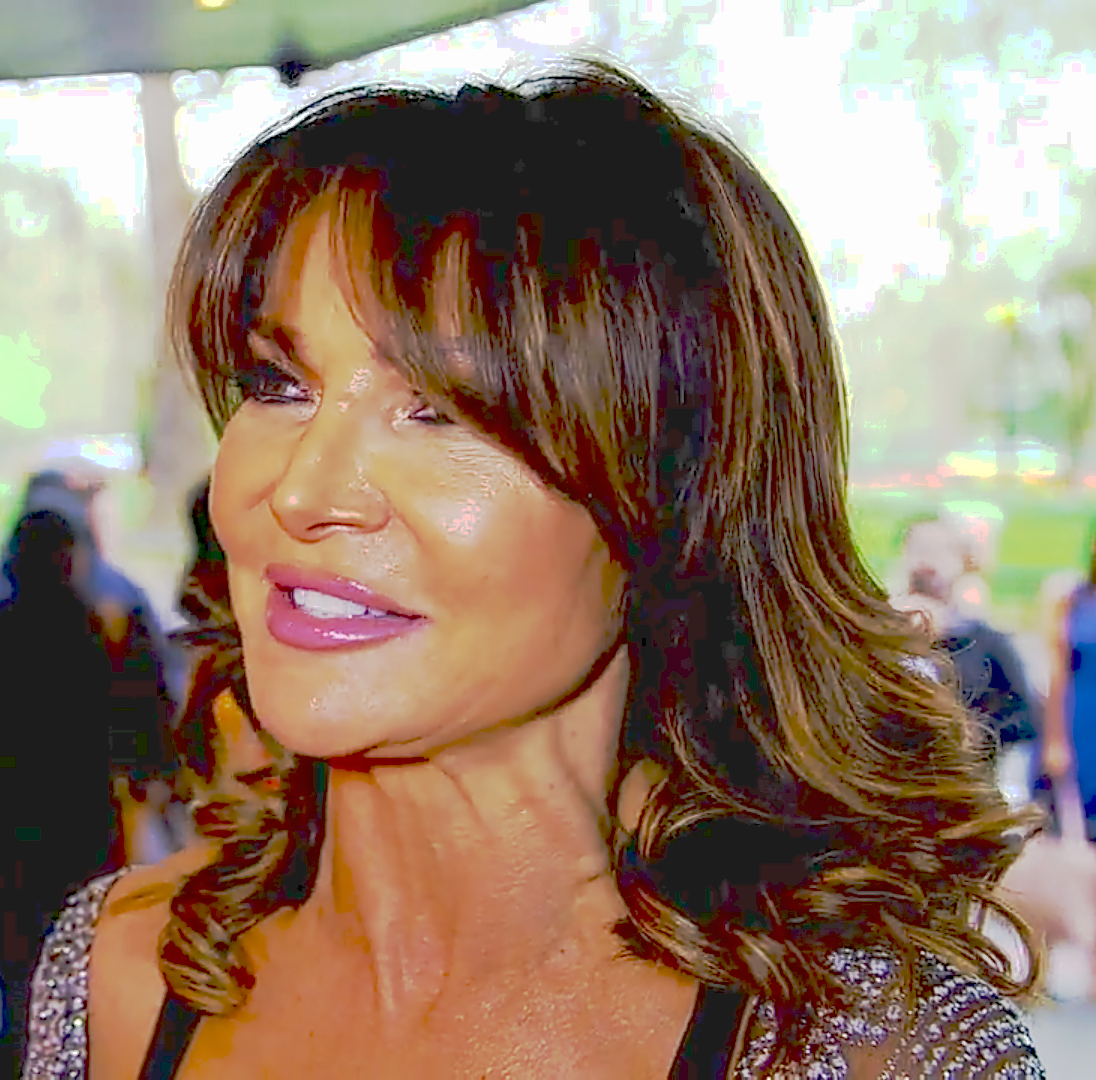
- Cundy at the 9th Asian Awards in 2019
- Born: Elizabeth Jane Miller; 2 May 1968 (age 58); Richmond, London, England
- Education: Central School of Speech and Drama
- Occupation: Television presenter
- Years active: 2008–present
- Spouse: Jason Cundy (m. 1994; div. 2012)
- Children: 2

Elizabeth Jane Cundy (née Miller; born 2 May 1968) is an English socialite, TV personality and former wife of footballer Jason Cundy.

== Career ==
Cundy appeared on ITV's This Morning in their A Day with a Designer series and has since regularly participated in debates and features. She covered the FIFA World Cup for GMTV and became one of their main debate specialists. In 2010, Cundy and her husband Jason both won Celebrity Four Weddings, where Lizzie faced David Van Day, Katie Hopkins and Francine Lewis. In 2012, Cundy became the red carpet reporter for ITV2's film review show ITV at the Movies alongside David Bass and James King. She had a beauty and style column in Town and Country House and a show business column for OK! Magazine and the Daily Express. Cundy starred as the lead in the West End musical 'WAGS' 2014.

Cundy hosted her own football show called Wags World, and was the main Showbiz reporter for OKTV. She was also a "Grid Girl" for Formula 1 racing, and criticised the end of the use of "Grid Girls". She works and features on This Morning, Good Morning Britain, The Alan Titchmarsh Show and Sky News.

Cundy previously hosted a show called WAGS World on Wedding TV. Additionally, she co-hosts the reality makeover programme called So Would You Dump Me Now? with Sue Moxley also for Sky Wedding TV. She is currently filming Sporting Icon WAGS and appears as a guest on This Morning, with more than fifty appearances since 2008 on ITV, as well as on Celebrity Big Brother's Bit on the Side from 2012 to 2018.

Cundy is a radio presenter for FUBAR Radio, hosting a weekly showbiz chat show called Access All Areas with journalist Stephen Leng.

Since 2026 Cundy has appeared as a regular on GB News's Saturday 5

== Personal life ==
Cundy married Chelsea footballer Jason Cundy in 1994; they separated in 2010 and divorced in December 2012. They have two children together.

She is a supporter of Reform UK.
