= Celebrity Karaoke Club =

- Genre: Reality competition
- Voices of: Grace Shush
- Narrated by: Lynsey Murrell
- Country of origin: United Kingdom
- Original language: English
- No. of series: 4
- No. of episodes: 24

Production
- Executive producer: Will MacDonald
- Running time: 60 minutes
- Production company: Monkey Kingdom

Original release
- Network: ITV2
- Release: 23 September 2020 – 11 June 2022

Celebrity Karaoke Club is a British reality television singing show in which celebrities sing karaoke in hope of being crowned champion. It began on 23 September 2020 on ITV2.

The first series was won by Scarlett Moffatt. The show was renewed for a second series and a special edition featuring drag queens and kings in 2021, and the show began airing nightly instead of weekly. The second series began on 5 July 2021 and was won by AJ Odudu, whilst the Drag edition was won by Trinity The Tuck. The show was renewed for a third series which began airing on 6 June 2022, after the premiere of Love Island and was won by Kaz Kamwi. On 27 April 2023, ITV axed the show after four series.

== Format ==
A group of celebrities are brought together in a karaoke bar in London. Seven celebrities enter on the first night. They first compete in a solo round where they select a song from the playlist which has a different theme each week. Following this, they sing a duet with another celebrity. When there is an odd number of celebrities left in the club, a special guest usually accompanies the celebrity on stage to duet one of their own songs. At the end of the evening each celebrity votes for who they think was the best and worst performer, the two worst performers compete in a Karaoke Clash and the remaining celebrities choose who is eliminated. The following week, the eliminated celebrity is replaced by one or more new celebrities who are also eligible to be crowned karaoke champion.

== Series overview ==
| No. | Episodes | Premiere date | Finale date | Contestants | Winner | Runners-up |
|---|---|---|---|---|---|---|
| 1 | 6 | 23 September 2020 | 28 October 2020 | 13 | Scarlett Moffatt | David Potts |
| 2 | 6 | 5 July 2021 | 10 July 2021 | 13 | AJ Odudu | Amelia Lily |
| Drag | 6 | 26 September 2021 | 1 October 2021 | 12 | Trinity the Tuck | The Vivienne |
| 3 | 6 | 6 June 2022 | 11 June 2022 | 12 | Kaz Kamwi | Donna Preston |

== Series 1 (2020) ==
| Celebrity | Known for | Entered | Status |
|---|---|---|---|
| Tallia Storm | Singer | Week 1 | Eliminated 1st on 23 September 2020 |
| Melvin Odoom | Television & radio presenter | Week 1 | Eliminated 2nd on 30 September 2020 |
| Judi Love | Comedian & Loose Women panellist | Week 2 | Eliminated 3rd on 7 October 2020 |
| Diana Vickers | Singer & The X Factor contestant | Week 3 | Eliminated 4th on 14 October 2020 |
| Baga Chipz | Drag queen & RuPaul's Drag Race UK contestant | Week 4 | Eliminated 5th on 21 October 2020 |
| Samira Mighty | Love Island star | Week 5 | Eliminated 6th on 21 October 2020 |
| Roman Kemp | Capital FM presenter | Week 6 | Eliminated 7th on 28 October 2020 |
| Courtney Act | Drag queen, singer, & entertainer | Week 1 | Eliminated 8th on 28 October 2020 |
| Joel Dommett | Comedian & television presenter | Week 5 | Eliminated 9th on 28 October 2020 |
| Jess Wright | Former The Only Way Is Essex star | Week 1 | Eliminated 10th on 28 October 2020 |
| Luke Kempner | Comedian & impressionist | Week 1 | Third place on 28 October 2020 |
| David Potts | Ibiza Weekender star | Week 1 | Runner-up on 28 October 2020 |
| Scarlett Moffatt | Television personality & presenter | Week 1 | Winner on 28 October 2020 |

=== Results and elimination ===
Celebrity
| Celebrity | Episode | | | | | | | | |
| Celebrity | 1 | 2 | 3 | 4 | 5 | Final | | | |
| Celebrity | 1 | 2 | 3 | 4 | 5 | Round 1 | Round 2 | Round 3 | Round 4 |
|---|---|---|---|---|---|---|---|---|---|
| Scarlett | WIN | SAFE | WIN | SAFE | SAFE | SAFE | SAFE | SAFE | WINNER |
| David | BTM2 | SAFE | SAFE | SAFE | BTM3 | SAFE | SAFE | SAFE | RUNNER-UP |
| Luke | SAFE | SAFE | BTM2 | SAFE | WIN | SAFE | SAFE | ELIM | Stayed |
| Jess | SAFE | BTM2 | SAFE | SAFE | SAFE | SAFE | ELIM | Stayed | |
| Joel | —N/a | | | | SAFE | SAFE | ELIM | Stayed | |
| Courtney | SAFE | SAFE | SAFE | BTM2 | SAFE | ELIM | Stayed | | |
| Roman | —N/a | | | | | ELIM | Stayed | | |
| Baga | —N/a | | | WIN | ELIM | | | | |
| Samira | —N/a | | | | ELIM | | | | |
| Diana | —N/a | | SAFE | ELIM | | | | | |
| Judi | —N/a | WIN | ELIM | | | | | | |
| Melvin | SAFE | ELIM | | | | | | | |
| Tallia | ELIM | | | | | | | | |

Keywords

- SAFE = The celebrity advanced to the following week
- ELIM = The celebrity was eliminated.
- BTM2 = The celebrity was in the bottom two but was saved by their fellow celebrities
- RUNNER-UP = The celebrity was the runner-up.
- WINNER = The celebrity was the winner.
- Stayed = The celebrity was eliminated but remained in the club for the rest of the night.

Colour key
The celebrity was eliminated.
The celebrity was voted the best performance.
The celebrity was in the bottom two but was saved by their fellow celebrities
The celebrity was the runner-up.
The celebrity was the winner.

=== Episodes ===
==== Week 1 ====
- Opening number: "Shut Up and Dance"
- Solo Round: Squad Goals
- Closing number: "Bye, Bye, Baby (Baby Goodbye)"

| Order | Celebrity | Song | Order | Duet | Result |
|---|---|---|---|---|---|
| 1 | Tallia | "No Scrubs" | 10 | "Walk This Way" (with Jess) | Bottom two |
| 2 | David | "Don't Cha" | 11 | "Too Many Broken Hearts" (with Jason Donovan) | Bottom two |
| 3 | Luke | "I Want It That Way" | 9 | "Let's Get Ready to Rhumble" (with Melvin) | Safe |
| 4 | Courtney | "Wannabe" | 8 | "Summer Nights" (with Scarlett) | Safe |
| 5 | Melvin | "End of the Road" | 9 | "Let's Get Ready to Rhumble" (with Luke) | Safe |
| 6 | Jess | "Relight My Fire" | 10 | "Walk This Way" (with Tallia) | Safe |
| 7 | Scarlett | "Gold" | 8 | "Summer Nights" (with Courtney) | Karaoke Champion |

Karaoke Clash;

| Celebrity | Song | Result |
|---|---|---|
| David | "Born This Way" | Safe |
| Tallia | "Born This Way" | Eliminated |

Votes to eliminate

- Scarlett: Tallia
- Courtney: Tallia
- Luke: David
- Melvin: David
- Jess: Tallia

==== Week 2 ====
- Opening number: "Wake Me Up Before You Go-Go"
- Solo Round: Slide into the DMs
- Closing number: "Goodbye"

| Order | Celebrity | Song | Order | Duet | Result |
|---|---|---|---|---|---|
| 1 | David | "S&M" | 10 | "Black Widow" (with Luke) | Safe |
| 2 | Judi | "Pony" | 9 | "Sisters Are Doin' It for Themselves" (with Scarlett) | Karaoke Champion |
| 3 | Luke | "Sex on Fire" | 10 | "Black Widow" (with David) | Safe |
| 4 | Scarlett | "I Kissed a Girl" | 9 | "Sisters Are Doin' It for Themselves" (with Judi) | Safe |
| 5 | Jess | "I'll Make Love to You" | 11 | "The Boy Is Mine" (with Courtney) | Bottom two |
| 6 | Melvin | "Señorita" | 8 | "Lady Marmalade" (with Courtney) | Bottom two |
| 7 | Courtney | "I Touch Myself" | 8 | "Lady Marmalade" (with Melvin) | Safe |
| 7 | Courtney | "I Touch Myself" | 11 | "The Boy Is Mine" (with Jess) | Safe |

Karaoke Clash;

| Celebrity | Song | Result |
|---|---|---|
| Jess | "Call Me Maybe" | Safe |
| Melvin | "Call Me Maybe" | Eliminated |

Votes to eliminate

- Luke: Jess
- Courtney: Melvin
- Judi: Jess
- David: Melvin
- Scarlett: Melvin

==== Week 3 ====
- Opening number: "I Predict a Riot"
- Solo Round: Lyrically Blessed
- Closing number: "Bye Bye Bye"

| Order | Celebrity | Song | Order | Duet | Result |
|---|---|---|---|---|---|
| 1 | Luke | "The Fresh Prince of Bel-Air" | 9 | "A Whole New World" (with Courtney) | Bottom two |
| 2 | Diana | "It's Raining Men" | 10 | "You're the One That I Want" (with Jess) | Safe |
| 3 | Jess | "Gangsta's Paradise" | 10 | "You're the One That I Want" (with Diana) | Safe |
| 4 | Scarlett | "Oops! I Did It Again" | 11 | "Bring It All Back" (with Rachel Stevens) | Karaoke Champion |
| 5 | David | "Pound the Alarm" | 8 | "Barbie Girl" (with Judi) | Safe |
| 6 | Judi | "Push It" | 8 | "Barbie Girl" (with David) | Bottom two |
| 7 | Courtney | "Can't Get You Out of My Head" | 9 | "A Whole New World" (with Luke) | Safe |

Karaoke Clash;

| Celebrity | Song | Result |
|---|---|---|
| Judi | "Livin' on a Prayer" | Eliminated |
| Luke | "Livin' on a Prayer" | Safe |

Votes to eliminate

- Scarlett: Judi
- Courtney: Luke
- Diana: Luke
- Jess: Judi
- David: Judi

==== Week 4 ====
- Opening number: "Best Song Ever"
- Solo Round: Teenage Dirtbag
- Closing number: "Leaving on a Jet Plane"

| Order | Celebrity | Song | Order | Duet | Result |
|---|---|---|---|---|---|
| 1 | Scarlett | "Genie in a Bottle" | 8 | "Don't Go Breaking My Heart" (with Baga) | Safe |
| 2 | Courtney | "Don't Speak" | 10 | "Islands in the Stream" (with David) | Bottom two |
| 3 | Diana | "Smells Like Teen Spirit" | 11 | "Everybody Get Up" (with Abz Love) | Bottom two |
| 4 | Luke | "7 Days" | 9 | "Nothing's Gonna Stop Us Now" (with Jess) | Safe |
| 5 | Jess | "Ironic" | 9 | "Nothing's Gonna Stop Us Now" (with Luke) | Safe |
| 6 | Baga | "...Baby One More Time" | 8 | "Don't Go Breaking My Heart" (with Scarlett) | Karaoke Champion |
| 7 | David | "She's So Lovely" | 10 | "Islands in the Stream" (with Courtney) | Safe |

Karaoke Clash;

| Celebrity | Song | Result |
|---|---|---|
| Courtney | "I Don't Want to Miss a Thing" | Safe |
| Diana | "I Don't Want to Miss a Thing" | Eliminated |

Votes to eliminate

- David: Courtney
- Jess: Diana
- Scarlett: Diana
- Baga: Diana
- Luke: Voting intention not revealed

==== Week 5 ====
- Opening number: "I Bet You Look Good on the Dancefloor"
- Solo Round: Sing as Your Mum Would Fancy
- Closing number: "Don't You (Forget About Me)"

| Order | Celebrity | Song | Order | Duet | Result |
|---|---|---|---|---|---|
| 1 | Joel | "Gettin' Jiggy wit It" | 9 | "Endless Love" (with Baga) | Safe |
| 2 | Courtney | "Dancing On My Own" | 10 | "5,6,7,8" (with Scarlett) | Safe |
| 3 | Baga | "It's Not Unusual" | 9 | "Endless Love" (with Joel) | Bottom three |
| 4 | Samira | "Happy" | 11 | "Hate That I Love You" (with David) | Bottom three |
| 5 | Scarlett | "Livin' la Vida Loca" | 10 | "5,6,7,8" (with Courtney) | Safe |
| 6 | Jess | "Da Ya Think I'm Sexy?" | 12 | "Ain't No Mountain High Enough" (with Luke) | Safe |
| 7 | Luke | "Hero" | 12 | "Ain't No Mountain High Enough" (with Jess) | Karaoke Champion |
| 8 | David | "Glad You Came" (with Max George) | 11 | "Hate That I Love You" (with Samira) | Bottom three |

Karaoke Clash;

| Celebrity | Song | Result |
|---|---|---|
| Baga | "I Will Survive" | Eliminated |
| David | "I Will Survive" | Safe |
| Samira | "I Will Survive" | Eliminated |

Votes to Eliminate

- Luke: Baga & Samira
- Courtney: Baga & David
- Jess: Baga & Samira
- Luke: Baga & Samira
- Scarlett: Baga & Samira

==== Week 6: Final ====
- Opening number: "Good as Hell"
- Closing number: "Raise Your Glass"

| Order | Celebrity | Song | Order | Shuffle | Order | Song | Result |
|---|---|---|---|---|---|---|---|
| 1 | Scarlett | "Bohemian Rhapsody" | 9 | "Shake It Off" | 15 | "Mr. Brightside" | Safe |
| 2 | Joel | "Cry Me a River" | 12 | "Crazy" | N/A (already eliminated) | | Eliminated |
| 3 | David | "Someone like You" | 8 | "Sweet Dreams (Are Made of This)" | 14 | "Believe" | Safe |
| 4 | Roman | "Burn" | N/A (already eliminated) | | | | Eliminated |
| 5 | Luke | "I Believe in a Thing Called Love" | 10 | "Let's Dance" | 13 | "Build Me Up Buttercup" | Third place |
| 6 | Courtney | "Ain't Nobody" | N/A (already eliminated) | | | | Eliminated |
| 7 | Jess | "And I Am Telling You I'm Not Going" | 11 | "Bad Romance" | N/A (already eliminated) | | Eliminated |

Karaoke Clash;

| Celebrity | Song | Result |
|---|---|---|
| David | "Flashdance... What a Feeling" | Runner-up |
| Scarlett | "Flashdance... What a Feeling" | Winner |

== Series 2 (2021) ==
| Celebrity | Known for | Entered | Status |
|---|---|---|---|
| Max and Harvey | Singers & YouTube personalities | Day 1 | Eliminated 1st on 5 July 2021 |
| Sonny Jay | Capital FM presenter | Day 1 | Eliminated 2nd on 6 July 2021 |
| Marcel Somerville | Blazin' Squad singer & Love Island star | Day 3 | Eliminated 3rd on 7 July 2021 |
| Olivia Attwood | Television personality | Day 1 | Eliminated 4th on 8 July 2021 |
| Darren Harriott | Stand-up comedian | Day 4 | Eliminated 5th on 8 July 2021 |
| Suzi Ruffell | Stand-up comedian | Day 3 | Eliminated 6th on 9 July 2021 |
| Yasmin Evans | Television & radio presenter | Day 5 | Eliminated 7th on 10 July 2021 |
| Tanya Bardsley | The Real Housewives of Cheshire star | Day 1 | Eliminated 8th on 10 July 2021 |
| Mark-Francis Vandelli | Made in Chelsea star | Day 2 | Eliminated 9th on 10 July 2021 |
| Brian Dowling | Big Brother 2 winner & television presenter | Day 1 | Eliminated 10th & 11th on 10 July 2021 |
| Jordan Davies | Ibiza Weekender star | Day 5 | Eliminated 10th & 11th on 10 July 2021 |
| Amelia Lily | Singer & television personality | Day 1 | Runner-up on 10 July 2021 |
| AJ Odudu | Television presenter | Day 1 | Winner on 10 July 2021 |

=== Results and elimination ===
Celebrity
| Celebrity | Episode | | | | | | | |
| Celebrity | 1 | 2 | 3 | 4 | 5 | Final | | |
| Celebrity | 1 | 2 | 3 | 4 | 5 | Round 1 | Round 2 | Round 3 |
|---|---|---|---|---|---|---|---|---|
| AJ | SAFE | SAFE | WIN | SAFE | SAFE | SAFE | SAFE | WINNER |
| Amelia | SAFE | BTM3 | SAFE | BTM3 | SAFE | SAFE | SAFE | RUNNER-UP |
| Brian | WIN | SAFE | SAFE | SAFE | SAFE | SAFE | ELIM | Stayed |
| Jordan | —N/a | | | | WIN | SAFE | ELIM | Stayed |
| Mark-Francis | —N/a | WIN | BTM2 | SAFE | SAFE | ELIM | Stayed | |
| Tanya | SAFE | SAFE | SAFE | WIN | BTM2 | ELIM | Stayed | |
| Yasmin | —N/a | | | | SAFE | ELIM | Stayed | |
| Suzi | —N/a | | SAFE | SAFE | ELIM | | | |
| Darren | —N/a | | | ELIM | | | | |
| Olivia | SAFE | BTM3 | SAFE | ELIM | | | | |
| Marcel | —N/a | | ELIM | | | | | |
| Sonny | BTM2 | ELIM | | | | | | |
| Max & Harvey | ELIM | | | | | | | |

Keywords

- SAFE = The celebrity advanced to the following week
- ELIM = The celebrity was eliminated.
- BTM2 = The celebrity was in the bottom two but was saved by their fellow celebrities
- RUNNER-UP = The celebrity was the runner-up.
- WINNER = The celebrity was the winner.
- Stayed = The celebrity was eliminated but remained in the club for the rest of the night.

Colour key
The celebrity was eliminated.
The celebrity was voted the best performance.
The celebrity was in the bottom two but was saved by their fellow celebrities
The celebrity was the runner-up.
The celebrity was the winner.

=== Episodes ===
==== Day 1 ====
- Opening number: "Can't Stop the Feeling!"
- Solo Round: In with a Bang
- Duet Round: Shower Serenades
- Closing number: "When You're Gone"

| Order | Celebrity | Song | Order | Duet | Result |
|---|---|---|---|---|---|
| 1 | Sonny | "Blinding Lights" | 8 | "This Love" (with Tanya) | Bottom two |
| 2 | AJ | "Deeper Shade of Blue" | 9 | "Teenage Dirtbag" (with Max & Harvey) | Safe |
| 3 | Olivia | "Stronger" | 10 | "Left Outside Alone" (with Amelia) | Safe |
| 4 | Max & Harvey | "Touch" | 9 | "Teenage Dirtbag" (with AJ) | Bottom two |
| 5 | Brian | "Something Kinda Ooooh" | 11 | "Just a Little" (with Liberty X) | Karaoke Champion |
| 6 | Tanya | "Million Dollar Bill" | 8 | "This Love" (with Sonny) | Safe |
| 7 | Amelia | "Midnight Sky" | 10 | "Left Outside Alone" (with Olivia) | Safe |

Karaoke Clash;

| Celebrity | Song | Result |
|---|---|---|
| Max & Harvey | "Rain on Me" | Eliminated |
| Sonny | "Rain on Me" | Safe |

Votes to eliminate

- AJ: Max & Harvey
- Amelia: Max & Harvey
- Tanya: Max & Harvey
- Brian: Voting intention not revealed
- Olivia: Voting intention not revealed

==== Day 2 ====
- Opening number: "Black Magic"
- Solo Round: Feeling Sexy
- Duet Round: Vegas Heavy Hitters
- Closing number: "Don't Leave Me This Way"

| Order | Celebrity | Song | Order | Duet | Result |
|---|---|---|---|---|---|
| 1 | Amelia | "Hot Stuff" | 9 | "Let Me Entertain You" (with Amelia) | Bottom three |
| 2 | AJ | "Sexual Healing" | 11 | "C'est la Vie" (with B*Witched) | Safe |
| 3 | Brian | "Eternal Flame" | 8 | "Toxic" (with Tanya) | Safe |
| 4 | Olivia | "Mysterious Girl" | 10 | "That Don't Impress Me Much" (with Mark-Francis) | Bottom three |
| 5 | Mark-Francis | "I Will Survive" | 10 | "That Don't Impress Me Much" (with Olivia) | Karaoke Champion |
| 6 | Sonny | "2 Become 1" | 9 | "Let Me Entertain You" (with Amelia) | Bottom three |
| 7 | Tanya | "Rude Boy" | 8 | "Toxic" (with Brian) | Safe |

Karaoke Clash;

| Celebrity | Song | Result |
|---|---|---|
| Amelia | "Firework" | Safe |
| Olivia | "Firework" | Safe |
| Sonny | "Firework" | Eliminated |

Votes to eliminate

- Tanya: Amelia
- AJ: Sonny
- Mark-Francis: Olivia
- Brian: Sonny

==== Day 3 ====
- Opening number: "What Makes You Beautiful"
- Solo Round: Teenage Fantasy
- Duet Round: Everybody Dance
- Closing number: "Survivor"

| Order | Celebrity | Song | Order | Duet | Result |
|---|---|---|---|---|---|
| 1 | Marcel | "Tha Crossroads" | 11 | "I Wanna Dance with Somebody (Who Loves Me)" (with Mark-Francis) | Bottom two |
| 2 | Brian | "Spinning Around" | 12 | "Stop" (with Olivia) | Safe |
| 3 | Suzi | "Ironic" | 9 | "Single Ladies (Put a Ring on It)" (with AJ) | Safe |
| 4 | Tanya | "Umbrella" | 10 | "Pure and Simple" (with Amelia & Suzanne Shaw) | Safe |
| 5 | AJ | "Uptown Girl" | 9 | "Single Ladies (Put a Ring on It)" (with Suzi) | Karaoke Champion |
| 6 | Mark-Francis | "Fly Me to the Moon" | 11 | "I Wanna Dance with Somebody (Who Loves Me)" (with Marcel) | Bottom two |
| 7 | Amelia | "Hot n Cold" | 10 | "Pure and Simple" (with Tanya & Suzanne Shaw) | Safe |
| 8 | Olivia | "Sk8er Boi" | 12 | "Stop" (with Brian) | Safe |

Karaoke Clash;

| Celebrity | Song | Result |
|---|---|---|
| Marcel | "Let It Go" | Eliminated |
| Mark-Francis | "Let It Go" | Safe |

Votes to eliminate

- Tanya: Marcel
- Olivia: Mark-Francis
- Brian: Marcel
- AJ: Marcel
- Amelia: Voting intention not revealed
- Suzi: Voting intention not revealed

==== Day 4 ====
- Opening number: "I Kissed a Girl"
- Solo Round: Feeling Myself
- Duet Round: A Night at the Movies
- Closing number: "Stay Another Day"

| Order | Celebrity | Song | Order | Duet | Result |
|---|---|---|---|---|---|
| 1 | AJ | "Reach" | 11 | "Tragedy" (with Darren & Steps) | Safe |
| 2 | Darren | "Everybody (Backstreet's Back)" | 11 | "Tragedy" (with AJ & Steps) | Bottom three |
| 3 | Olivia | "Don't Stop Me Now" | 10 | "Can't Fight the Moonlight" (with Suzi) | Bottom three |
| 4 | Mark-Francis | "Respect" | 12 | "(I've Had) The Time of My Life" (with Amelia) | Safe |
| 5 | Brian | "Milkshake" | 9 | "Part of Your World" (with Tanya) | Safe |
| 6 | Amelia | "What's Up?" | 12 | "(I've Had) The Time of My Life" (with Mark-Francis) | Bottom three |
| 7 | Tanya | "Ice Ice Baby" | 9 | "Part of Your World" (with Brian) | Karaoke Champion |
| 8 | Suzi | "So What" | 10 | "Can't Fight the Moonlight" (with Olivia) | Safe |

Karaoke Clash;

| Celebrity | Song | Result |
|---|---|---|
| Amelia | "Mr. Brightside" | Safe |
| Darren | "Mr. Brightside" | Eliminated |
| Olivia | "Mr. Brightside" | Eliminated |

Votes to eliminate

- Mark-Francis: Darren & Olivia
- Brian: Darren & Amelia
- Suzi: Amelia & Olivia
- AJ: Amelia & Olivia
- Tanya: Darren & Olivia

Since there was a tie between Darren and Amelia, Karaoke Champion Tanya had the deciding vote.

==== Day 5 ====
- Opening number: "Uptown Funk"
- Solo Round: Last Orders
- Duet Round: Flashback Friday
- Closing number: "Since U Been Gone"

| Order | Celebrity | Song | Order | Duet | Result |
|---|---|---|---|---|---|
| 1 | AJ | "She Bangs" | 11 | "Jump (For My Love)" (with Mark-Francis) | Safe |
| 2 | Jordan | "Year 3000" | 12 | "All Rise" (with Yasmin & Blue) | Karaoke Champion |
| 3 | Suzi | "9 to 5" | 9 | "No Scrubs" (with Brian) | Bottom two |
| 4 | Yasmin | "Young Hearts Run Free" | 12 | "All Rise" (with Jordan & Blue) | Safe |
| 5 | Tanya | "Valerie" | 10 | "Faith" (with Amelia) | Bottom two |
| 6 | Mark-Francis | "Big Spender" | 11 | "Jump (For My Love)" (with AJ) | Safe |
| 7 | Brian | "Dancing Queen" | 9 | "No Scrubs" (with Suzi) | Safe |
| 8 | Amelia | "Walking on Sunshine" | 10 | "Faith" (with Tanya) | Safe |

Karaoke Clash;

| Celebrity | Song | Result |
|---|---|---|
| Suzi | "Sex on Fire" | Eliminated |
| Tanya | "Sex on Fire" | Safe |

Votes to eliminate

- Brian: Suzi
- Jordan: Suzi
- Yasmin: Tanya
- Amelia: Suzi
- AJ: Suzi
- Mark-Francis: Voting intention not revealed

==== Day 6: Final ====
- Opening number: "Spice Up Your Life"
- Solo Round: All Time Anthems
- Duet Round: On the Edge of Glory
- Closing number: "Never Forget"

| Order | Celebrity | Song | Order | Duet | Result |
|---|---|---|---|---|---|
| 1 | Yasmin | "Push It" | N/A (already eliminated) | | Eliminated |
| 2 | Mark-Francis | "I'm So Excited" | N/A (already eliminated) | | Eliminated |
| 3 | Brian | "I Should Be So Lucky" | 9 | "Telephone" (with AJ) | Eliminated |
| 4 | Amelia | "This Is Me" | 10 | "You're the One That I Want" (with Jordan) | Safe |
| 5 | Jordan | "It's Raining Men" | 10 | "You're the One That I Want" (with Amelia) | Eliminated |
| 6 | Tanya | "Everybody Get Up" | N/A (already eliminated) | | Eliminated |
| 7 | AJ | "Somebody Told Me" | 9 | "Telephone" (with Brian) | Safe |

Karaoke Clash;

| Celebrity | Song | Result |
|---|---|---|
| AJ | "I Don't Want to Miss a Thing" | Winner |
| Amelia | "I Don't Want to Miss a Thing" | Runner-up |

== Drag Edition (2021) ==
| Drag Queen/King | Entered | Status |
|---|---|---|
| Freida Slaves | Day 1 | Eliminated 1st on 26 September 2021 |
| Crystal | Day 1 | Eliminated 2nd on 27 September 2021 |
| Vinegar Strokes | Day 3 | Eliminated 3rd on 28 September 2021 |
| Tete Bang | Day 1 | Eliminated 4th on 29 September 2021 |
| Cara Melle | Day 1 | Withdrew on 30 September 2021 |
| Mahatma Khandi | Day 5 | Eliminated 5th on 30 September 2021 |
| Gingzilla | Day 2 | Eliminated 6th on 1 October 2021 |
| Lil' Test Ease | Day 4 | Eliminated 7th on 1 October 2021 |
| Danny Beard | Day 5 | Eliminated 8th on 1 October 2021 |
| Manila Luzon | Day 1 | Third place on 1 October 2021 |
| The Vivienne | Day 1 | Runner-up on 1 October 2021 |
| Trinity The Tuck | Day 1 | Winner on 1 October 2021 |

=== Results and elimination ===
Drag Queen/King
| Drag Queen/King | Episode | | | | | | | |
| Drag Queen/King | 1 | 2 | 3 | 4 | 5 | Final | | |
| Drag Queen/King | 1 | 2 | 3 | 4 | 5 | Round 1 | Round 2 | Round 3 |
|---|---|---|---|---|---|---|---|---|
| Trinity The Tuck | WIN | WIN | SAFE | SAFE | SAFE | SAFE | SAFE | WINNER |
| The Vivienne | SAFE | SAFE | WIN | SAFE | SAFE | SAFE | SAFE | RUNNER-UP |
| Manila Luzon | SAFE | SAFE | SAFE | WIN | SAFE | SAFE | ELIM | Stayed |
| Danny Beard | —N/a | | | | WIN | SAFE | ELIM | Stayed |
| Lil' Test Ease | —N/a | | | SAFE | SAFE | ELIM | Stayed | |
| Gingzilla | —N/a | SAFE | SAFE | BTM2 | BTM2 | ELIM | Stayed | |
| Mahatma Khandi | —N/a | | | | ELIM | | | |
| Cara Melle | SAFE | BTM2 | SAFE | SAFE | WD | | | |
| Tete Bang | SAFE | SAFE | BTM2 | ELIM | | | | |
| Vinegar Strokes | —N/a | | ELIM | | | | | |
| Crystal | BTM2 | ELIM | | | | | | |
| Freida Slaves | ELIM | | | | | | | |

Keywords

- SAFE = The drag queen/king advanced to the following week
- ELIM = The drag queen/king was eliminated.
- BTM2 = The drag queen/king was in the bottom two but was saved by their fellow celebrities
- RUNNER-UP = The drag queen/king was the runner-up.
- WINNER = The drag queen/king was the winner.
- WD = The drag queen/king withdrew from the competition.
- Stayed = The drag queen/king was eliminated but remained in the club for the rest of the night.

Colour key
The drag queen/king was eliminated.
The drag queen/king was voted the best performance.
The drag queen/king was in the bottom two but was saved by their fellow celebrities
The drag queen/king withdrew from the competition.
The drag queen/king was the runner-up.
The drag queen/king was the winner.

=== Episodes ===
==== Day 1 ====
- Opening number: "Stupid Love"
- Solo Round: Gay
- Duet Round: Body-ody-ody
- Closing number: "I Will Always Love You"

| Order | Drag Queen/King | Song | Order | Duet | Result |
|---|---|---|---|---|---|
| 1 | Manila Luzon | "Finally" | 8 | "S&M" (with Crystal) | Safe |
| 2 | The Vivienne | "If I Could Turn Back Time" | 10 | "Bootylicious" (with Freida Slaves) | Safe |
| 3 | Trinity The Tuck | "Man! I Feel Like a Woman!" | 9 | "Like a Virgin" (with Cara Melle) | Karaoke Champion |
| 4 | Crystal | "Beautiful" | 8 | "S&M" (with Manila Luzon) | Bottom two |
| 5 | Freida Slaves | "Say You'll Be There" | 10 | "Bootylicious" (with The Vivienne) | Bottom two |
| 6 | Tete Bang | "Hard out Here" | 11 | "Murder on the Dancefloor" (with Sophie Ellis-Bextor) | Safe |
| 7 | Cara Melle | "Truth Hurts" | 9 | "Like a Virgin" (with Trinity The Tuck) | Safe |

Karaoke Clash;

| Celebrity | Song | Result |
|---|---|---|
| Crystal | "Wrecking Ball" | Safe |
| Freida Slaves | "Wrecking Ball" | Eliminated |

Votes to eliminate

- Trinity The Tuck: Freida Slaves
- Cara Melle: Freida Slaves
- Tete Bang: Crystal
- The Vivienne: Freida Slaves
- Manila Luzon: Voting intention not revealed

==== Day 2 ====
- Opening number: "Timber"
- Solo Round: Basic Bottomless Brunch
- Duet Round: Butch Queen
- Closing number: "How Do I Live"

| Order | Drag Queen/King | Song | Order | Duet | Result |
|---|---|---|---|---|---|
| 1 | Trinity The Tuck | "Work Bitch" | 10 | "Livin' la Vida Loca" (with Manila Luzon) | Karaoke Champion |
| 2 | The Vivienne | "The Best" | 8 | "Y.M.C.A." (with Gingzilla) | Safe |
| 3 | Gingzilla | "Chandelier" | 8 | "Y.M.C.A." (with The Vivienne) | Safe |
| 4 | Manila Luzon | "I'm Every Woman" | 10 | "Livin' la Vida Loca" (with Trinity The Tuck) | Safe |
| 5 | Cara Melle | "Buttons" | 11 | "Freak Like Me" (with Mutya Buena) | Bottom two |
| 6 | Crystal | "Call Me" | 9 | "Maneater" (with Tete Bang) | Bottom two |
| 7 | Tete Bang | "Barbie Girl" | 9 | "Maneater" (with Crystal) | Safe |

Karaoke Clash;

| Celebrity | Song | Result |
|---|---|---|
| Cara Melle | "Strong Enough" | Safe |
| Crystal | "Strong Enough" | Eliminated |

Votes to eliminate

- The Vivienne: Crystal
- Trinity The Tuck: Crystal
- Tete Bang: Cara Melle
- Manila Luzon: Crystal
- Gingzilla: Crystal

==== Day 3 ====
- Opening number: "Crazy in Love"
- Solo Round: Lights, Camera, Action
- Duet Round: Sisters Are Doin' It for Themselves
- Closing number: "Leave (Get Out)"

| Order | Drag Queen/King | Song | Order | Duet | Result |
|---|---|---|---|---|---|
| 1 | Gingzilla | "My Heart Will Go On" | 9 | "No More Tears (Enough Is Enough)" (with Trinity The Tuck) | Safe |
| 2 | Manila Luzon | "Footloose" | 10 | "Don't Let Go (Love)" (with Cara Melle) | Safe |
| 3 | Vinegar Strokes | "Juice" | 8 | "Wannabe" (with Tete Bang) | Bottom two |
| 4 | Trinity The Tuck | "I Love Rock 'n' Roll" | 9 | "No More Tears (Enough Is Enough)" (with Gingzilla) | Safe |
| 5 | Tete Bang | "Lady Marmalade" | 8 | "Wannabe" (with Vinegar Strokes) | Bottom two |
| 6 | The Vivienne | "Ghostbusters" | 11 | "Sound of the Underground" (with Nadine Coyle) | Karaoke Champion |
| 7 | Cara Melle | "Purple Rain" | 10 | "Don't Let Go (Love)" (with Manila Luzon) | Safe |

Karaoke Clash;

| Celebrity | Song | Result |
|---|---|---|
| Tete Bang | "Heaven Is a Place on Earth" | Safe |
| Vinegar Strokes | "Heaven Is a Place on Earth" | Eliminated |

Votes to eliminate

- Gingzilla: Vinegar Strokes
- Trinity The Tuck: Vinegar Strokes
- Manila Luzon: Tete Bang
- Cara Melle: Vinegar Strokes
- The Vivienne: Voting intention not revealed

==== Day 4 ====
- Opening number: "Who Do You Think You Are"
- Solo Round: Salty Songs
- Duet Round: Huns Only
- Closing number: "We Are Never Ever Getting Back Together"

| Order | Drag Queen/King | Song | Order | Duet | Result |
|---|---|---|---|---|---|
| 1 | Manila Luzon | "Dancing On My Own" | 8 | "Shut Up and Drive" (with Lil' Test Ease) | Karaoke Champion |
| 2 | The Vivienne | "I'm Outta Love" | 10 | "Superstar" (with Tete Bang) | Safe |
| 3 | Lil' Test Ease | "Hey Ya!" | 8 | "Shut Up and Drive" (with Manila Luzon) | Safe |
| 4 | Tete Bang | "You Oughta Know" | 10 | "Superstar" (with The Vivienne) | Bottom two |
| 5 | Cara Melle | "And I Am Telling You I'm Not Going" | 9 | "Genie in a Bottle" (with Gingzilla) | Safe |
| 6 | Trinity The Tuck | "Bitch" | 11 | "Don't Cha" (with Ashley Roberts) | Safe |
| 7 | Gingzilla | "Bad Romance" | 9 | "Genie in a Bottle" (with Cara Melle) | Bottom two |

Karaoke Clash;

| Celebrity | Song | Result |
|---|---|---|
| Gingzilla | "It's All Coming Back to Me Now" | Safe |
| Tete Bang | "It's All Coming Back to Me Now" | Eliminated |

Votes to eliminate

- Manila Luzon: Tete Bang
- Cara Melle: Tete Bang
- Lil' Test Ease: Gingzilla
- The Vivienne: Tete Bang
- Trinity The Tuck: Voting intention not revealed

==== Day 5 ====
- Opening number: "Call Me Maybe"
- Solo Round: Money Talks
- Duet Round: Stars and Stripes
- Closing number: "Sorry Not Sorry"

Cara Melle withdrew from the competition due to illness.

| Order | Drag Queen/King | Song | Order | Duet | Result |
|---|---|---|---|---|---|
| 1 | Danny Beard | "Freed from Desire" | 11 | "Whole Again" (with Kerry Katona) | Karaoke Champion |
| 2 | Trinity The Tuck | "It's Not Right but It's Okay" | 9 | "Get the Party Started" (with Manila Luzon) | Safe |
| 3 | Manila Luzon | "Material Girl" | 9 | "Get the Party Started" (with Trinity The Tuck) | Safe |
| 4 | Mahatma Khandi | "Independent Women Part I" | 10 | "Sweet Child o' Mine" (with The Vivienne) | Bottom two |
| 5 | Gingzilla | "Black and Gold" | 8 | "Marry You" (with Lil' Test Ease) | Bottom two |
| 6 | The Vivienne | "Money, Money, Money" | 10 | "Sweet Child o' Mine" (with Mahatma Khandi) | Safe |
| 7 | Lil' Test Ease | "Thrift Shop" | 8 | "Marry You" (with Gingzilla) | Safe |
| N/A | Cara Melle | N/A | N/A | N/A | Withdrew |

Karaoke Clash;

| Celebrity | Song | Result |
|---|---|---|
| Gingzilla | "Roar" | Safe |
| Mahatma Khandi | "Roar" | Eliminated |

Votes to eliminate

- Lil' Test Ease: Mahatma Khandi
- Manila Luzon: Mahatma Khandi
- Trinity The Tuck: Mahatma Khandi
- Danny Beard: Voting intention not revealed
- The Vivienne: Voting intention not revealed

==== Day 6: Final ====
- Opening number: "Believe"
- Solo Round: Killer Karaoke
- Duet Round: 2 Gays 1 Bop
- Closing number: "I Wanna Dance with Somebody (Who Loves Me)"

| Order | Celebrity | Song | Order | Duet | Result |
|---|---|---|---|---|---|
| 1 | The Vivienne | "I'd Do Anything for Love (But I Won't Do That)" | 7 | "Sisters Are Doin' It for Themselves" (with Manila Luzon) | Safe |
| 2 | Gingzilla | "California Gurls" | N/A (already eliminated) | | Eliminated |
| 3 | Danny Beard | "Rolling in the Deep" | 8 | "A Little Respect" (with Trinity The Tuck) | Eliminated |
| 4 | Lil' Test Ease | "I Bet You Look Good on the Dancefloor" | N/A (already eliminated) | | Eliminated |
| 5 | Manila Luzon | "It's Oh So Quiet" | 7 | "Sisters Are Doin' It for Themselves" (with The Vivienne) | Third place |
| 6 | Trinity The Tuck | "Proud Mary" | 8 | "A Little Respect" (with Danny Beard) | Safe |

Karaoke Clash;

| Celebrity | Song | Result |
|---|---|---|
| Trinity The Tuck | "The Edge of Glory" | Winner |
| The Vivienne | "The Edge of Glory" | Runner-up |

== Series 3 (2022) ==
| Celebrity | Known for | Entered | Status |
|---|---|---|---|
| Callum Izzard | Ibiza Weekender star | Day 1 | Eliminated 1st on 6 June 2022 |
| Matt Evers | Dancing on Ice professional | Day 2 | Eliminated 2nd on 7 June 2022 |
| Karim Zeroual | Former CBBC presenter | Day 1 | Eliminated 3rd on 8 June 2022 |
| A'Whora | Drag queen & RuPaul's Drag Race UK contestant | Day 1 | Eliminated 4th on 9 June 2022 |
| Chrishell Stause | Actress & Selling Sunset star | Day 1 | Eliminated 5th on 10 June 2022 |
| Arron Crascall | Internet personality & comedian | Day 5 | Eliminated 6th, 7th & 8th on 11 June 2022 |
| Chloe Sims | The Only Way Is Essex star | Day 4 | Eliminated 6th, 7th & 8th on 11 June 2022 |
| Laura Anderson | Love Island finalist | Day 1 | Eliminated 6th, 7th & 8th on 11 June 2022 |
| Queen MoJo | Dancer & Peckham's Finest star | Day 5 | Eliminated 9th & 10th on 11 June 2022 |
| Bobby Cole Norris | Former The Only Way Is Essex star | Day 1 | Eliminated 9th & 10th on 11 June 2022 |
| Donna Preston | Actress, comedian & writer | Day 1 | Runner-up on 11 June 2022 |
| Kaz Kamwi | Love Island finalist | Day 3 | Winner on 11 June 2022 |

=== Results and elimination ===
Celebrity
| Celebrity | Episode | | | | | | | |
| Celebrity | 1 | 2 | 3 | 4 | 5 | Final | | |
| Celebrity | 1 | 2 | 3 | 4 | 5 | Round 1 | Round 2 | Round 3 |
|---|---|---|---|---|---|---|---|---|
| Kaz | —N/a | | SAFE | WIN | SAFE | SAFE | SAFE | WINNER |
| Donna | WIN | SAFE | SAFE | SAFE | SAFE | SAFE | SAFE | RUNNER-UP |
| Bobby | BTM2 | SAFE | WIN | SAFE | SAFE | SAFE | ELIM | Stayed |
| Queen MoJo | —N/a | | | | WIN | SAFE | ELIM | Stayed |
| Laura | SAFE | SAFE | SAFE | BTM2 | BTM2 | ELIM | Stayed | |
| Chloe | —N/a | | | SAFE | SAFE | ELIM | Stayed | |
| Arron | —N/a | | | | SAFE | ELIM | Stayed | |
| Chrishell | SAFE | SAFE | SAFE | SAFE | ELIM | | | |
| A'Whora | SAFE | BTM2 | BTM2 | ELIM | | | | |
| Karim | SAFE | WIN | ELIM | | | | | |
| Matt | —N/a | ELIM | | | | | | |
| Callum | ELIM | | | | | | | |

Keywords

- SAFE = The celebrity advanced to the following week
- ELIM = The celebrity was eliminated.
- BTM2 = The celebrity was in the bottom two but was saved by their fellow celebrities
- RUNNER-UP = The celebrity was the runner-up.
- WINNER = The celebrity was the winner.
- Stayed = The celebrity was eliminated but remained in the club for the rest of the night.

Colour key
The celebrity was eliminated.
The celebrity was voted the best performance.
The celebrity was in the bottom two but was saved by their fellow celebrities
The celebrity was the runner-up.
The celebrity was the winner.

=== Episodes ===
==== Day 1 ====
- Opening number: "We Found Love"
- Closing number: "Sorry"

| Order | Celebrity | Song | Order | Duet | Result |
|---|---|---|---|---|---|
| 1 | Chrishell | "We Are Never Ever Getting Back Together" | 9 | "Bad Romance" (with Callum) | Safe |
| 2 | Laura | "I Love Rock 'n' Roll" | 8 | "(I've Had) The Time of My Life" (with Donna) | Safe |
| 3 | Bobby | "Shout Out to My Ex" | 10 | "Finally" (with A'Whora) | Bottom two |
| 4 | Donna | "Can't Get You Out of My Head" | 8 | "(I've Had) The Time of My Life" (with Laura) | Karaoke Champion |
| 5 | Karim | "American Boy" | 11 | "Don't Stop Movin'" (with Bradley McIntosh & Tina Barrett of S Club 7) | Safe |
| 6 | A'Whora | "Fancy" | 10 | "Finally" (with Bobby) | Safe |
| 7 | Callum | "All of Me" | 9 | "Bad Romance" (with Chrishell) | Bottom two |

Karaoke Clash;

| Celebrity | Song | Result |
|---|---|---|
| Bobby | "Wrecking Ball" | Safe |
| Callum | "Wrecking Ball" | Eliminated |

Votes to eliminate

- A'Whora: Callum
- Karim: Callum
- Chrishell: Callum
- Donna: Voting intention not revealed
- Laura: Voting intention not revealed

==== Day 2 ====
- Opening number: "Domino"
- Closing number: "I Knew You Were Trouble"

| Order | Celebrity | Song | Order | Duet | Result |
|---|---|---|---|---|---|
| 1 | Matt | "Shut Up and Dance" | 9 | "When I Grow Up" (with Bobby) | Bottom two |
| 2 | Chrishell | "Mr. Brightside" | 8 | "Firework" (with Donna) | Safe |
| 3 | Donna | "Strong Enough" (with The Vivienne) | 8 | "Firework" (with Chrishell) | Safe |
| 4 | Laura | "I Wanna Dance with Somebody (Who Loves Me)" | 11 | "Freak Me" (with Dane Bowers) | Safe |
| 5 | Karim | "Dancing on the Ceiling" | 10 | "Pony" (with A'Whora) | Karaoke Champion |
| 6 | A'Whora | "You Raise Me Up" | 10 | "Pony" (with Karim) | Bottom two |
| 7 | Bobby | "Call Me Maybe" | 9 | "When I Grow Up" (with Matt) | Safe |

Karaoke Clash;

| Celebrity | Song | Result |
|---|---|---|
| A'Whora | "Chandelier" | Safe |
| Matt | "Chandelier" | Eliminated |

Votes to eliminate

- Donna: Matt
- Karim: A'Whora
- Chrishell: Matt
- Laura: Matt
- Bobby: Voting intention not revealed

==== Day 3 ====
- Opening number: "Just Dance"
- Closing number: "Tears Dry on Their Own"

Fleur East appeared as a special guest.

| Order | Celebrity | Song | Order | Duet | Result |
|---|---|---|---|---|---|
| 1 | A'Whora | "Party in the U.S.A." | 8 | "Summer Nights" (with Karim) | Bottom two |
| 2 | Kaz | "Take a Bow" | 10 | "Baby" (with Chrishell) | Safe |
| 3 | Karim | "One Kiss" | 8 | "Summer Nights" (with A'Whora) | Bottom two |
| 4 | Donna | "Never Ever" | 9 | "Wannabe" (with Laura) | Safe |
| 5 | Laura | "Ooh Aah... Just a Little Bit" | 9 | "Wannabe" (with Donna) | Safe |
| 6 | Bobby | "Something Kinda Ooooh" | 11 | "Sax" (with Fleur East) | Karaoke Champion |
| 7 | Chrishell | "Milkshake" | 10 | "Baby" (with Kaz) | Safe |

Karaoke Clash;

| Celebrity | Song | Result |
|---|---|---|
| A'Whora | "Stronger (What Doesn't Kill You)" | Safe |
| Karim | "Stronger (What Doesn't Kill You)" | Eliminated |

Votes to eliminate

- Fleur East: Karim
- Laura: A'Whora
- Kaz: Karim
- Bobby: Karim
- Chrishell: Karim
- Donna: Voting intention not revealed

==== Day 4 ====
- Opening number: "Raise Your Glass"
- Closing number: "I'll Be There for You"

Antony Costa and Simon Webbe appeared as special guests.

| Order | Celebrity | Song | Order | Duet | Result |
|---|---|---|---|---|---|
| 1 | Kaz | "7 Rings" | 9 | "Rolling in the Deep" (with Bobby) | Karaoke Champion |
| 2 | Donna | "I Wanna Be the Only One" | 8 | "I Say a Little Prayer" (with A'Whora) | Safe |
| 3 | Chloe | "You've Got the Love" | 11 | "One Love" (with Antony Costa & Simon Webbe of Blue) | Safe |
| 4 | Chrishell | "Valerie" | 10 | "Genie in a Bottle" (with Laura) | Safe |
| 5 | Laura | "Dancing in the Moonlight" | 10 | "Genie in a Bottle" (with Chrishell) | Bottom two |
| 6 | A'Whora | "Hallelujah" | 8 | "I Say a Little Prayer" (with Donna) | Bottom two |
| 7 | Bobby | "Womanizer" | 9 | "Rolling in the Deep" (with Kaz) | Safe |

Karaoke Clash;

| Celebrity | Song | Result |
|---|---|---|
| A'Whora | "Holding Out for a Hero" | Eliminated |
| Laura | "Holding Out for a Hero" | Safe |

Votes to eliminate

- Chloe: A'Whora
- Donna: Laura
- Bobby: A'Whora
- Chrishell: Laura
- Kaz: A'Whora

==== Day 5 ====
- Opening number: "Hot n Cold"
- Closing number: "Back for Good"

| Order | Celebrity | Song | Order | Duet | Result |
|---|---|---|---|---|---|
| 1 | Laura | "Jump (For My Love)" | 11 | "I Think We're Alone Now" (with Kaz) | Bottom two |
| 2 | Chrishell | "Man! I Feel Like a Woman!" | 10 | "Like a Virgin" (with Chloe) | Bottom two |
| 3 | Queen MoJo | "Anaconda" | 12 | "Everybody Get Up" (with Arron & Five) | Karaoke Champion |
| 4 | Kaz | "Irreplaceable" | 11 | "I Think We're Alone Now" (with Laura) | Safe |
| 5 | Donna | "Left Outside Alone" | 9 | "I Will Survive" (with Bobby) | Safe |
| 6 | Bobby | "Faith" | 9 | "I Will Survive" (with Donna) | Safe |
| 7 | Arron | "Naïve" | 12 | "Everybody Get Up" (with Queen MoJo & Five) | Safe |
| 8 | Chloe | "Ain't Nobody" | 10 | "Like a Virgin" (with Chrishell) | Safe |

Karaoke Clash;

| Celebrity | Song | Result |
|---|---|---|
| Chrishell | "Only Girl (In the World)" | Eliminated |
| Laura | "Only Girl (In the World)" | Safe |

Votes to eliminate

- Arron: Chrishell
- Donna: Laura
- Chloe: Chrishell
- Bobby: Laura
- Kaz: Chrishell
- Queen MoJo: Voting intention not revealed

==== Day 6 ====
- Opening number: "I Gotta Feeling"
- Closing number: "Remember"

| Order | Celebrity | Song | Order | Duet | Result |
|---|---|---|---|---|---|
| 1 | Queen MoJo | "Never Too Much" | 9 | "Umbrella" (with Kaz) | Eliminated |
| 2 | Kaz | "Sweet Melody" | 9 | "Umbrella" (with Queen MoJo) | Safe |
| 3 | Laura | "Ain't No Mountain High Enough" | N/A (already eliminated) | | Eliminated |
| 4 | Donna | "Eternal Flame" | 8 | "...Baby One More Time" (with Bobby) | Safe |
| 5 | Bobby | "Teenage Dream" | 8 | "...Baby One More Time" (with Donna) | Eliminated |
| 6 | Arron | "Shotgun" | N/A (already eliminated) | | Eliminated |
| 7 | Chloe | "It Must Have Been Love" | N/A (already eliminated) | | Eliminated |

Karaoke Clash;

| Celebrity | Song | Result |
|---|---|---|
| Donna | "Livin' on a Prayer" | Runner-up |
| Kaz | "Livin' on a Prayer" | Winner |
