= Homegrown =

Homegrown may refer to any plants grown in a domestic setting. It may also refer to:

== Music ==
- Home Grown, an American rock band formed in 1994
- Home Grown (Geri Allen album), 1985
- Homegrown (Herbs album), 1990
- Homegrown (Dodgy album), 1994
- Home Grown (Blue Mountain album), 1998
- Homegrown (XTC album), 2001
- Homegrown (UB40 album), 2003
- Homegrown (New Zealand Idol album), 2004
- Homegrown (Neil Young album), 2020
- Homegrown (EP), a 2013 EP by rapper Chris Webby
- Homegrown, a 1999 album by Michelle Malone
- Home Grown, a 1972 album by Johnny Rivers
- Home Grown! The Beginners Guide to Understanding The Roots, Vol. 1 & 2, a 2005 compilation albums by the Roots
- Home Grown, aka KKUA Home Grown, a series of records produced by Hawaii's Ron Jacobs from 1976 to 1997
- "Homegrown" (Zac Brown Band song), 2015
- "Homegrown", a song by Neil Young from the 1977 album American Stars 'n Bars
- Homegrown (drum and bass event), Cape Town based drum and bass event
- Homegrown Music Festival (Duluth), a local music showcase in Duluth, Minnesota, US
- Homegrown Music Festival (New Zealand), a festival of Kiwi music in Wellington, New Zealand

== Other ==
- Homegrown (1998 film), a movie starring Billy Bob Thornton
- Homegrown F.C., a football club in Naivasha, Kenya
- Homegrown (play), a 2010 Canadian play about visiting a "homegrown" terrorist suspect
- Homegrown, an American gardening television show hosted by Jamila Norman
- Homegrown (2024 film), American documentary film by Michael Premo

== See also ==
- Homegrown Cafe, a radio program in Ottawa, Ontario, Canada, during the 1980s and 1990s
- Homegrown Cup, a collegiate basketball tournament in the Philippines
- Homegrown Hollywood, a late-night UK TV show from 2005
