= Wedding TV =

Women's television channel

Ownership
- Owner: Creamdove Limited

History
- Launched: 4 December 2006
- Closed: 21 May 2013

Wedding TV was a woman's lifestyle television channel broadcast in the United Kingdom. Separate versions of the channel were available in Poland and Italy. The channel claims to be the first TV channel of its kind, concentrating on love, life, relationships and weddings. The focus of the channel is primarily weddings and brides though there are programmes on fashion, beauty, celebrities and travel.

== History ==
Wedding TV was co-founded by Mirek Grabiec, Ben Watts, Marc Conneely and Tony Prince, a former DJ for Radio Luxembourg.

In August 2007, Wedding TV became the UK's first channel to eliminate tape entirely from delivery to play-out, significantly reducing the cost of production.

In 2008 Wedding TV won the Broadcast Digital Channel Award for the Best Specialist Channel.

On 25 November 2011, Wedding TV Limited entered administration. In December 2011, Wedding TV was purchased by Creamdove Limited.

On 9 May 2012, the channel was removed from Freesat channel 400, where it had been broadcasting since the launch of the service on 6 May 2008. On 21 May 2013, the channel was removed from Sky channel 266.

== Programming ==
- The Wedding Show – a magazine show featuring wedding advice, beautiful venues around the world and viewer competitions hosted by Sam Mann.
- Celebrity Brides Unveiled – a gossip show about celebrity brides and weddings.
- Celebrity Hens and Stags – an in house produced documentary series about Celebrities hosting Hen and Stag weekends with Redseven and thereafter StagWeb and GoHen (aired in 2012).
- Marrying Elvis – a documentary following three couples who share an Elvis Presley obsession and their plans for an 'Elvis Wedding'.
- For Better or For Worse – a program following an engaged couple who give up control of their wedding to their friends and family. With the help of a wedding planner and assistant they have $5000 to make their dream wedding come true in one week.
- So Would You Dump Me Now? – a reality program giving beauty makeovers to people who have been dumped by their partners, hosted by Lizzie Cundy and Sue Moxley.
- Brides On A Bus – David Van Day hosts an eleven-part reality series where ten brides-to-be travel from Lands End to Gretna Green on a traditional double-decker bus, along the way competing to win a wedding in Gretna Green.
- Three Grand Weddings – Ten-part series in which three couples compete to have the best budget wedding. Presented by Lucy Elliott of The Chief Bridesmaid who gives advice to the three teams and their respective wedding planners on how to have a great wedding on just three thousand pounds.

== Wedding TV Asia ==
On 21 May 2009, it was announced that Wedding TV +1 would be replaced with Wedding TV Asia on 1 July 2009. Wedding TV Asia would become the first channel in the UK to be dedicated to Asian weddings. The channel ceased broadcasting on 14 December 2010.
