= ITV at the Movies =

British television film review show

- Created by: Richard Leyland
- Starring: Giles Vickers-Jones (Series 1 to 6), Lizzie Cundy (Series 5-7), James King(Series 6-7), David Bass(Series 7)
- Country of origin: United Kingdom
- Original language: English
- No. of series: 7
- No. of episodes: 74 and 2 specials

Production
- Running time: 30 minutes

Original release
- Network: ITV2
- Release: 2005 – 18 December 2010

Related
- The Movie Show on ITV2; Jonathan Ross' Must-Watch Films

ITV at the Movies is a weekly British television film review show broadcast on ITV2, originally presented by Giles Vickers-Jones. The final series was presented by James King and was produced and directed by Richard Leyland. The show was replaced in 2011 by The Movie Show on ITV2.

The show looked at the weeks movie releases, featured the latest movie news and reviews plus looked at the UK Box Office top 5 and previewed the latest DVD releases.

In March 2010 a ITV at the Movies special aired on ITV2, presented by James King, featuring a look at the Oscar nominations.

In December 2009 a ITV at the Movies special aired on ITV2, presented by James King, featuring an interview with Avatar director James Cameron.

== Broadcast history ==
- Series 2 was broadcast Friday nights at 8:30pm on ITV2, with a repeat on the main ITV Network the next day (September to December 2005).
- Series 3 aired on Friday afternoons on ITV2 at 5:15pm with no repeat showing (September to October 2006).
- Series 4 moved back to a slightly later slot on Friday nights at 8:00pm, with a late night repeat on ITV4 (January to April 2007).
- Series 5 was broadcast Friday afternoons at 12:30pm on ITV2 (some weeks 1:00pm), with a repeat the next day on the same channel (5 September to 21 November 2008).
- In November 2008, The Daily Telegraph reported that ITV at the Movies hosted by Lizzie Cundy was outperforming Film 2008 hosted by Jonathan Ross.
- A Christmas special of ITV at the Movies was broadcast on ITV2 on Saturday 20 December 2008 at 2:25pm, with a repeat Wednesday 23 December 2008 at 10:30am.
- Series 6 was broadcast on Saturday afternoons between 1:35pm and 2:00pm on ITV2, with a repeat the next day around 8:30am and on Wednesday afternoons at 12:30pm or 1pm on ITV2 (21 November 2009 to 16 January 2010).
- ITV at the Movies special: Enter the World of James Cameron, aired Wednesday 16 December 2009 at 1pm ITV2.
- ITV at the Movies special: Oscars 2010, aired Saturday 6 March 2010 at 1:30pm ITV2.
- Series 7 (the final series) was broadcast Saturday afternoons around 1:30pm on ITV2, with a repeat the same day around 4am and the next lunchtime (25 September 2010 to 18 December 2010).
