= List of television programmes broadcast by ITV2 =

This is a list of television programmes broadcast by British television channel ITV2.

== Current programming ==
=== Original programming ===
==== Reality ====
- Big Brother (civilian series) (2023–present)
- Dress To Impress (2017–2022)
- Emergency Nurses (2022–2023)
- Love Island (civilian series) (2015–present)
- Peckham's Finest (2021–present)
- The Real Housewives of Cheshire (2026–present) (aired on ITVBe from 2015 to 2025)
- Secret Crush (2021–2022)
- The Only Way is Essex (2010–present) (shown on ITVBe from 2014–2025)

==== Comedy ====
- Don't Hate the Playaz (2018–present)
- Extraordinary (2024–present)
- G'wed (2024–present)
- The Stand Up Sketch Show (2019–present)

==== News ====
- FYI Daily (2010–present)

==== Companion programmes ====
- Big Brother: Late & Live (2023–present)
- I'm a Celebrity: Unpacked (2024-present)
- Love Island: Aftersun (2017–present)
- Love Island: Unseen Bits (2021–present)

==== ITVX originals ====
- Count Abdulla (2024–present)
- Loaded in Paradise (2023–2024)
- Ruby Speaking (2024–present)
- The Social Media Murders (2021–present)
- Tell Me Everything (2023–present)
- You & Me (2023–present)

=== Programming from other ITV channels ===
- Brit Awards (1999–present)
- Britain's Got Talent (2007–present)
- Catchphrase (2013–present)
- Deal or No Deal (2023–present)
- I'm a Celebrity...Get Me Out of Here! (2002–present)
- National Television Awards (1998–present)
- The Masked Singer (2020–present)
- The Voice UK (2017–present)

=== CITV programming ===
- Batwheels (2024–2026)
- Be Cool Scooby-Doo! (2023–2026)
- Bugs Bunny Builders (2024–2026)
- DC Super Hero Girls (2023–2026)
- Dodo (2023–2026)
- Jurassic World Camp Cretaceous (2023–2026)
- Looney Tunes Cartoons (2023–2026)
- Mr. Bean: The Animated Series (2023–2026)
- Scooby-Doo and Guess Who? (2023–2026)
- Scooby-Doo! Mystery Incorporated (2023–2026)
- The Epic Tales of Captain Underpants (2023–2026)
- Teen Titans Go! (2023–2026)
CITV programming on ITV2 stopped on Friday 10 April 2026.

=== Acquired programming ===
==== Drama ====
- All American (2022–present)
- Charmed (2024–present)
- Dawson's Creek (2023–present)
- Gilmore Girls (2024–present)
- The O.C. (2022–present)
- One Tree Hill (2022–present)
- Veronica Mars (2022–present) (Note: Seasons 1–3 only.)

==== Comedy ====
- American Dad! (2016–present)
- Bob's Burgers (2021–present)
- Chuck (2022–present)
- Crossing Swords (2020–present)
- Family Guy (2016–present)
- The Sex Lives of College Girls (2022–present)
- Superstore (2018–present)
- Two and a Half Men (2014–present, earlier seasons on ITV4) (Note: Seasons 9–12 only.)

==== Reality ====
- American Ninja Warrior (2024–present)
- Australian Ninja Warrior (2021–present)
- Dinner Date
- Gordon Ramsay's Food Stars (2024–present)
- Hell's Kitchen USA (2005–present)
- The Masked Singer US (2021–present) (Note: Also broadcast on ITV1.)
- The Real Housewives of Atlanta
- The Real Housewives of Beverly Hills
- The Real Housewives of D.C.
- The Real Housewives of Orange County
- The Real Housewives of New Jersey
- The Real Housewives of New York City
- The Real Housewives of Vancouver

== Former programming ==
=== Original programming ===
- @elevenish (2016)
- The Almost Impossible Gameshow (2015–2016)
- Apocalypse Wow (2021–2022)
- Beat TV (2012)
- Bedrock (1998-2000)
- The Big Reunion (2013–2014)
- Blind Date: Kiss and Tell (2002–2003)
- Britain's Got More Talent (2007–2019)
- Bromans (2017)
- Buffering (2021–2023)
- The Cabins (2021–2022)
- CelebAbility (2017–2023)
- CelebAir (2008)
- Celebrity Juice (2008–2022)
- Celebrity Wrestling: Bring it On (2005)
- Cockroaches (2015)
- Coleen's Real Women (2008)
- Comedy Cuts (2007–2008)
- Crazy Beaches
- Dancing on Ice Defrosted (2006–2007)
- Deadline (2007)
- Educating Joey Essex (2014–2016)
- The Emily Atack Show (2020-2022)
- The Exclusives (2012)
- Fake Reaction (2013–2014)
- The Fashion Show (2008)
- Fearne and... (2009–2010)
- FM (2009)
- Footballers' Wives: Extra Time (2005–2006)
- Freshers
- Ghosthunting With... (2006–2011)
- Girlfriends (2012–2013)
- Glitchy (2015)
- Greased Lightning (2007)
- Hell's Kitchen UK: Extra Portions (2004–2009)
- The Hot Desk (2007–2017)
- Ibiza Weekender (2013–2020)
- I'm a Celebrity...The Daily Drop (2020)
- I'm a Celebrity: Extra Camp (2016–2019)
- I'm a Celebrity...Get Me Out of Here! NOW! (2002–2015)
- Jack Osbourne: Adrenaline Junkie (2005–2009)
- Jedward: Let Loose (2010)
- The Job Lot (Note: First series aired on ITV in 2013.) (2014–2015)
- The Justin Lee Collins Show (2009)
- Katie & Peter (2004–2009)
- Katy Brand Versus
- Katy Brand's Big Ass Show (2007–2009)
- The Keith Lemon Sketch Show (2015–2016)
- Keith Lemon: Coming in America (2018)
- Keith Lemon's Very Brilliant World Tour (2008)
- Kerry Katona: The Next Chapter (2010–2011)
- Killer Camp (2019–2021)
- Laura, Ben and Him
- Lemon La Vida Loca (2012–2013)
- Lip Service (2006)
- Love Island: Aftersun (2005–2006)
- The Magaluf Weekender (2013–2014)
- Mark Wright's Hollywood Nights (2012)
- No Heroics (2008)
- Office Monkey
- Olly: Life on Murs (2012)
- Paris Hilton's British Best Friend (2009)
- Party Wright Around the World
- The Passions of Girls Aloud (2008)
- Peter Andre: My Life
- Peter Andre's Bad Boyfriend Club
- Plebs (2013–2023)
- The Princes Trust 30th Birthday Concert: Access All Areas (2006)
- Reality Bites (2015)
- Release the Hounds (2013–2018)
- The Record of the Year: Celebrity Choice (2003–2004)
- The Record of the Year: Downloaded (2005)
- Safeword (2015–2016)
- The Saturdays: 24/7 (2010)
- Secret Diary of a Call Girl (2007–2011)
- Singletown (2019)
- Soap Fever (1998–2002)
- Soapstar Superstar: Bonus Tracks (2006–2007)
- Survival of the Fittest (2018)
- Survivor Raw (2002)
- Switch (2012)
- Take Me Out: The Gossip (2012–2019)
- Tom Daley Goes Global (2014)
- Totally Bonkers Guinness World Records (2012–2015)
- Trevor McDonald Meets (1998–2001)
- Tricked (2013–2016)
- Trinity (2009)
- TV OD (2014)
- UK Radio Aid (2005)
- Viral Tap (2014)
- Who, What, Why
- Wide Angle
- What Katie Did Next (2009–2010) (moved to Sky Witness as Katie)
- The Xtra Factor (2004–2016)
- The Xtra Factor: Battle of the Stars (2006)
- Zomboat! (2019)

=== Programming from other ITV channels ===
- 2DTV (2001–2004)
- 60 Minute Makeover (2004–2005)
- 71 Degrees North (2010–2011)
- 1000 Heartbeats (2015–2016)
- A Touch of Frost (1998–2004)
- Agatha Christie's Poirot (1998–2004)
- Airline UK
- Alan Carr's Epic Gameshow (2020–2022)
- All-Star Cup (2006)
- All Star Family Fortunes (2006–2015)
- All Star Mr & Mrs (2008–2016)
- An Audience with... (1998–2006)
- Animals Do the Funniest Things (1999–2011)
- Ant & Dec's Push the Button (2010–2011)
- Ant & Dec's Saturday Night Takeaway (2002–2024)
- Bad Girls (1999–2006)
- BAFTA TV Awards (2000–2006)
- Beat the Star (2008–2009)
- Beauty and the Geek
- Benidorm (2007–2018)
- The Big Fight Live (1998–2005)
- The Biggest Loser (2009–2012)
- The Bill (1998–2000)
- Blind Date (1998–2003)
- Britain's Sexiest (2002)
- Bognor or Bust (2004)
- Born to Shine (2011)
- CD:UK (1998–2006)
- Celebrities Exposed (2003–2005)
- The Celebrity Awards
- Celebrity Fit Club (2002–2006)
- Celebrity Wrestling (2005)
- The Club (2003)
- The Cleveland Show (2016–2021)
- Club Reps (2001–2004)
- The Colour of Money (2009)
- Coronation Street (Note: Repeats and omnibus editions.) (1998–2022)
- The Crocodile Hunter Diaries (2002–2009)
- Creature Comforts (2003–2009)
- Crossroads (2001–2003)
- The Cube (2009–2015)
- Demons (2009)
- Dinner Date (ITV: 2010–2014, ITVBe: 2014–2023)
- Don't Try This at Home (1998–2001)
- Duel (2008)
- ElimiDate (2002)
- Emmerdale (1998–2022)
- Family Fortunes (1999–2000)
- Felicity
- Fool Britannia (2012–2013)
- Formula One (1999–2005)
- Gameshow Marathon (2005–2007)
- Generation Excess
- Give Your Mate a Break (1999)
- Gladiators (1999–2000)
- Gladiators: Train 2 Win (1999)
- Grease Is The Word (2007)
- Grimefighters
- The Grimleys (1999–2001)
- Grudge Match (2000)
- Haunted Homes
- Harry Hill's Alien Fun Capsule (2017–2019)
- Harry Hill's TV Burp (2001–2012)
- Headcases (2008)
- Heartbeat (1998–2000)
- Hell's Kitchen UK (2004–2009)
- Help! I Caught It Abroad†
- Henry VIII (2003)
- Hit Me Baby One More Time (2005)
- Holiday Airport
- Holiday Showdown (2003–2009)
- Homes from Hell
- I Wanna Marry "Harry" (now airing on ITVBe)
- In for a Penny (2019–2024)
- In the Studio
- The Impressionable Jon Culshaw (2004)
- Inspector Morse (1998–2004) (Repeats on ITV3)
- ITV at the Movies (2005–2010)
- ITV Play (2006–2007)
- The Jeremy Kyle Show (2005–2019)
- Junior Eurovision Song Contest (2003–2005) (moved to BBC One and CBBC)
- Junior Eurovision Song Contest: The British Final (2004–2005)
- Keep it in the Family (2014–2015)
- The Keith & Paddy Picture Show (2017–2018)
- Keith Lemon's LemonAid (2012)
- Kids Say the Funniest Things (1999–2001)
- Ladette to Lady
- Life's Funniest Moments
- Liverpool 1 (1998–2000)
- Love Island (celebrity series)(2005–2006)
- The Luvvies (2003–2004)
- Man'O'Man (1998–1999)
- ...Mania (1999–2006)
- The Marriage Ref (2011)
- Midsomer Murders (1999–2004) (Repeats on ITV3)
- Million Dollar Babes
- Mr. Bean (1990–1995) (repeats shown on ITV4)
- Mr Right (2002)
- Models, Misfits & Mayhem (2011)
- The Movie Show on ITV2 (2011)
- National Movie Awards (2007–2011)
- National Music Awards (2002–2003)
- National Television Awards
- Night and Day (2001–2003)
- Odd One In (2010–2011)
- Orange Playlist (2004–2007)
- Party in the Park (1999–2001)
- Penn & Teller: Fool Us
- The Planet's Funniest Animals
- Planet Rock Profiles (2002–2005)
- PokerFace (2006–2007)
- Pop Idol (2001–2003)
- Popstars (2001)
- Popstars: The Rivals (2002)
- Primeval (2007–2011)
- The Princes Trust 30th Birthday Concert Live (2006)
- The Reading Festival (2004–2005)
- Rebus (1998–2000)
- The Record of the Year (1998–2005)
- Ricki Lake
- Royal Pains (2013–2014)
- Sally
- Scorpion (2014–2016)
- Slap Bang with Ant & Dec (2001)
- Soapstar Superstar (2006–2007)
- The South Bank Show (now shown on Sky Arts)
- Space Precinct (2004–2009)
- Stars in Their Eyes (1999–2006)
- Supermarket Sweep (2019–2020)
- Survivor (2001-2002) (now on BBC One)
- Taggart (1998–2000) (Repeats on Drama & Alibi)
- Take Me Out (2010–2019)
- Text Santa (2011–2015)
- Thank God You're Here (2008)
- That's What I Call Television (2007)
- This Morning, This Afternoon (1999–2001)
- Through the Keyhole (2013–2019)
- Tickled Pink (2005)
- Top Dog Model (2012)
- Trisha (1998–2004)
- UEFA Champions League (1999–2005) (now shown on TNT Sports)
- Unlikely Lovers
- The Voice Kids (2017–2023)
- Wish You Were Here...? (1998–2001)
- With a Little Help from My Friends (2004-2005)
- Who's Doing the Dishes? (2014-2018)
- The Whole 19 Yards (2010)
- Winners & Losers
- World of Chat
- The X Factor (2004–2018)
- The X Factor: Battle of the Stars (2006)
- The X Factor: Celebrity (2019)
- The X Factor: The Band (2019)
- You've Been Framed! (1998–2022) (Jeremy Beadle era - 1998–1999, Lisa Riley era - 1998–2003, Jonathan Wilkes era 2003–2004, Harry Hill era - 2004–2022)

=== Acquired programming ===
- 666 Park Avenue (2013)
- Airline USA
- American Idol (2002–2012)
- America's Got Talent (2007–2014)
- Animal Practice (2013)
- Australian Princess (2006–2007)
- Aussie Ladette to Lady
- Baywatch (1999–2000)
- Ben and Kate (2013)
- Big Rich Texas (now airing on ITVBe)
- Bionic Woman (2008)
- Bordertown (2016)
- Dads (2014)
- Dinner Date (Australia) (2012–2014)
- Ellen's Game of Games (2020-2021)
- Entourage
- Gossip Girl (2007–2012)
- Grammy Awards (until 2011)
- Hart of Dixie (2022)
- Home and Away (1998–2000) (now on Channel 5)
- The Incredible Hulk (2000–2002)
- I'm a Celebrity...Get Me Out of Here! USA (2003, 2009)
- Late Show with David Letterman
- Lois & Clark: The New Adventures of Superman
- Maggie Winters (1998-1999)
- Married... with Children
- MC Hammer's Big Shot Academy
- Miss World 2001
- Mom (2014–2017) (now on Amazon Prime Video for the last four seasons)
- The Montel Williams Show
- Nanny 911 (2004–2012)
- National Basketball Association
- Psych (2013–2014)
- The Real Housewives of Atlanta (now airing on ITVBe)
- The Real Housewives of Beverly Hills (now airing on ITVBe)
- The Real Housewives of D.C. (now airing on ITVBe)
- The Real Housewives of Orange County (now airing on ITVBe)
- The Real Housewives of New Jersey (now shown on ITVBe)
- The Real Housewives of New York City (now airing on ITVBe)
- The Real Housewives of Vancouver (now airing on ITVBe)
- Roswell, New Mexico (2020)
- Santa Inc. (2021)
- Smallville (Seasons 1-4 repeats)
- Spin City (2004–2005)
- Sunset Beach (1999–2000)
- Supernatural (2005–2009) (moved to Sky Witness, then E4) (now on ITVX (seasons 1–13 only) and Amazon Prime Video)
- Surface (2006)
- Up All Night (2013)
- The Vampire Diaries (2010–2017)
- The X Factor USA (2011–2013)

=== CITV programming ===
- Animal Stories (1999)
- Are You Afraid of The Dark? (1999)
- Children's Ward (1999)
- Craig of the Creek (2023–2024)
- What's New, Scooby-Doo? (2023–2025)
- Crazy Cottage (1999)
- Dream Street (1999)
- Extreme Dinosaurs (1999)
- Extreme Ghostbusters (1999)
- Gladiators: Train 2 Win (1999)
- Lavender Castle (1999)
- Life Force (2000)
- Mad for It (1999)
- Mopatop's Shop (1999)
- Potamus Park (1999)
- Rosie and Jim (1999)
- SMTV Gold (2003)
- The Story Store (1999)
- Tom and Vicky (1999)
- Tots TV (1999)
- Whizziwig (1999)
- Wizadora (1999)
- ZZZap! (1999)

== See also ==
- ITV (TV network)
- ITV2
- List of television programmes broadcast by ITV
