= Wedding TV Asia =

- Country: United Kingdom; Ireland

Programming
- Picture format: 4:3, 576i (SDTV)

Ownership
- Owner: Wedding TV Limited
- Sister channels: Wedding TV

History
- Launched: 1 July 2009
- Replaced: Wedding TV +1
- Closed: 14 December 2010

Wedding TV Asia was a woman's lifestyle television channel broadcast in the United Kingdom, on the Sky platform. It launched on 1 July 2009, replacing Wedding TV +1. Wedding TV Asia was the first channel in the UK to be dedicated to Asian weddings.

On 6 December 2010, Wedding TV Asia was removed from Freesat channel 401. The channel ceased broadcasting completely on 14 December.
