= The Movie Show on ITV2 =

2011 British TV series

- Created by: Richard Leyland; James King
- Starring: James King
- Country of origin: United Kingdom
- No. of series: 1
- No. of episodes: 13

Production
- Running time: 30 minutes

Original release
- Network: ITV2
- Release: 24 February – 19 May 2011

Related
- ITV at the Movies; Jonathan Ross' Must-Watch Films

The Movie Show on ITV2 is a weekly British television film review show on ITV2, presented by James King. The show is a new format produced by R 'n' R Limited and commissioned by ITV2.

The series looks at the latest weekly film releases in the UK and each programme includes a film premiere and red carpet interviews from the west end of London, movie features and movie previews including interviews with all the stars and directors of the latest releases.

Also included in the programmes are the latest DVD, Download and Blu-ray releases, UK top 5 box office chart and James King's review of the big film releases, movie gossip and news.

== Episodes ==
No.	Title	Original release date
1	"1.1"	24 February 2011
Ahead of this year's Oscars, James King takes a look at the major nominations for the awards, including Best Film, Best Actor, Best Actress, Best Director and Best Animated Film.
2	"1.2"	3 March 2011
Including a look at the new release of The Adjustment Bureau, Helen Mirren talks about The Tempest plus James Purefoy on Iron clad. Amber Heard talks about Drive Angry, plus the Top Five films and latest DVD releases.
3	"1.3"	10 March 2011
A look at the latest movie releases, including Battle: Los Angeles, Fair Game starring Sean Penn, Ben Affleck's new film The Company Men, and The Resident, which stars Hilary Swank.
4	"1.4"	17 March 2011
James King takes a look at the latest movie releases, including The Lincoln Lawyer', which stars Matthew McConaughey. Gossip Girl actor Ed Westwick talks about Chalet Girl and there are interviews with the cast of Anuvahood. Plus movie reviews, film news and the newest DVD releases.
5	"1.5"	24 March 2011
James King takes a look at the latest movies, including a peek at the premiere of The Eagle, which stars Channing Tatum and Jamie Bell. Plus Bradley Cooper talks about Limitless and Dominic Cooper discusses A Turtle's Tale. There are also film reviews, movie news and the newest DVD releases, including Unstoppable, starring Denzel Washington.
6	"1.6"	31 March 2011
James King presents a look at the latest movie releases, including Sucker Punch, Killing Bono, Oranges and Sunshine, and the animated film Hop, which stars Russell Brand. Plus film reviews, movie news and the newest DVD releases, including Megamind and The American.
7	"1.7"	7 April 2011
James King takes a look at the latest movie releases, including 3D animation Rio, Disney film Mars Needs Moms, chiller The Roommate and teen action movie Tomorrow, When the War Began. Plus, movie news and DVD releases, including State of Play and The Man Who Fell to Earth.
8	"1.8"	14 April 2011
James King takes a look at the latest movie releases, including Red Riding Hood, Your Highness and Scream 4. Plus, reviews of DVD releases, including Harry Potter and the Deathly Hallows: Part 1 and Burlesque.
9	"1.9"	21 April 2011
James King takes a look at the latest movie releases, including Fast Five, the newest instalment in the Fast and the Furious franchise. There are also looks at the remake of Arthur, which stars Russell Brand and Helen Mirren, and Vanessa Hudgens's new movie Beastly. Plus there are film reviews, movie news and a rundown of the latest DVD releases, including The Chronicles of Narnia: The Voyage of the Dawn Treader, TRON: Legacy and Little Fockers.
10	"1.10"	28 April 2011
James King takes a look at the latest movie releases, including comic book blockbuster Thor, The Veteran and Cedar Rapids, which stars Ed Helms. Plus film reviews, movie news and the newest DVD releases, including The Tourist and Burlesque.
11	"1.11"	5 May 2011
James King presents a look at the latest movie releases, including Water For Elephants starring Reese Witherspoon and Robert Pattinson, Hanna starring Saoirse Ronan and Cate Blanchett, and Priest 3D starring Paul Bettany. Plus there are film reviews, movie news and a rundown of the latest DVD releases, including The Green Hornet and multi-Oscar-winning drama The King's Speech.
12	"1.12"	12 May 2011
James King takes a look at the latest cinema releases, including Joe Cornish's sci-fi comedy Attack the Block, comedy Take Me Home Tonight, starring Anna Faris and Topher Grace, and drama The Way, which Emilio Estevez directs and stars in with his father Martin Sheen . Plus, film news and a rundown of the newest DVD releases, including The Way Back and Blue Valentine.
13	"1.13"	19 May 2011
James King takes a look at the latest cinema releases, including Pirates of the Caribbean: On Stranger Tides and Paul Giamatti's new comedy Win Win. Plus film reviews, movie news, a look at the Cannes Film Festival and a rundown of the newest DVD releases, including Gulliver's Travels and the Oscar-winning Black Swan.
