= Homegrown Hollywood =

Homegrown Hollywood was a late-night television show aired by BBC2 in the United Kingdom in July 2005. Presented by James King, the show consisted of a series of short films or productions made by amateur, independent film-makers, ranging from students to independent studios, thus offering these people a showcase for their productions. The short films varied in duration from 1 to 30 minutes. In total, there were 12 hours of short films, split into three separate broadcasts of 4 hours each, and broadcast over consecutive nights between 2am and 6am. All three broadcasts were repeated at the same times on the same days for several consecutive weeks. It was produced by the BBC, with two BBC staff (the producer, Kuldip Dhadda and a production co-ordinator) as well as BBC intern, Joan Brogan and three others.
