= Pini (web series) =

- Written by: Tomer Barzide; Udi Shadmi
- Directed by: Tomer Barzide
- Starring: Tomer Barzide; Tom Jones; Charlotte Beckett; Catherine Gordon; Vauxhall Jermaine
- Music by: Sass Hoory
- Country of origin: Israel
- Original languages: English, Hebrew, French

Production
- Producer: Market Master
- Editor: Tom Jones
- Camera setup: Tom Bradley
- Running time: 5-12 minutes

Original release
- Release: 21 November 2010

Pini is a 2010 comedy web series which was broadcast on Ynet. It was shot in London, Cambridge and Paris and was produced by Market Master. The Series was created and written by the star, Tomer Barzide. It is currently in its third season. It is widely regarded as a "pioneering project" in Israel.

== Plot ==
The series follows Pini (Tomer Barzide) after he leaves military service as a cook in Israel and travels to London to become a successful chef (like Gordon Ramsay). He finds a flat share with Tom Jones (Tom Jones) as he struggles to adjust to life in London.

== Production ==
The series was produced by Market Master. Production was carried out by Pini Productions over two months in London, Cambridge and Paris. It was shot in high density on Canon 550D DSLR cameras. The dialogue is a mixture of English, Hebrew and French.

== Cast ==
- Pini played by Tomer Barzide
- Tom Jones played by Tom Jones
- Carla played by Charlotte Beckett
- Olive played by Catherine Gordon
- Boss played by Daniel Moore
- Mark played by Oliver Browne
- Joseph played by Vauxhall Jermaine
- Audrey played by Sara Ginac
- Kasano played by Luca Pusceddu
- Barman played by David Keenan
- Michael played by Edward Eales-White
- Checkout Guy played by Marcus Kai
- Doctors Receptionist played by Kasha Bajor

== Crew ==
- Executive Producers - Udi Shadmi and Assaf Vidavsky
- Writer and Director - Tomer Barzide
- Director - Gille Klabin (first two episodes)
- Line Producer - Sean Keane
- Editor - Tom Jones
- Camera Operator - Tom Bradley
- Sound Recordist - Mario Percori (first two episodes) Stuart Gilfedder, Sean Keane
- Sound Post - Motti Benny, Mario Pecori (first two episodes)
- Casting - Rachael David
- Original Music composed by Sass Hoory

== Critical reception ==
The series was well received and gained much credit for its production value. Pini is the first web series in Israel which is considered to have TV production value. The show had wide interest from TV and print media, a substantial number of hits on Ynet, and a large following on its Facebook fan page.

== Episodes ==
No. overall	No. in series	Title	Directed by	Written by	Original release date	Season code
1	1	"Nice to meet you"	Gille Klabin	Tomer Barzide	November 21, 2010	S01E01
Pini arrives in London after finishing military service to become a famous chef (like Gordon Ramsey). He finds a flat share with Tom Jones and a gets a job in a café. Whilst here he meets Carla, a writer for a French magazine. Pini later finds out that Carla is Tom's cousin.
2	2	"Would you?"	Gille Klabin	Tomer Barzide	November 24, 2010	S01E02
Pini trying to impress Carla makes a mess. Pini later teaches Tom Jones some Hebrew.
3	3	"Houmus"	Tomer Barzide	Tomer Barzide	November 28, 2010	S01E03
Olive tries to get Pini to go on a date with him, but Pini is busy going to see a cooking school. Tom goes with Pini to see the cooking school, but has no luck in getting enrolled. Later Pini and Tom grab some lunch in a supermarket, when the cashier tells Pini how to eat his Houmus.
4	4	"One Testicle"	Tomer Barzide	Tomer Barzide	December 1, 2010	S01E04
Pini wakes up from to find Tom coming in the door early. When confronted, Tom tells Pini about his boomerang training which he has been doing for almost 10 years. Tom then reveals the fountain of his youth - he has only one testicle. Pini and Tom go to play matkot (beach tennis) in the park, and Pini finds himself invited to go to an art gallery with Tom and Carla.
5	5	"Teddy Bear"	Tomer Barzide	Tomer Barzide	December 5, 2010	S01E05
After a trip to the art gallery, Tom finds himself making a video of Pini tearing a teddy bear, to prove his point to Carla. Despite Carla's initial reaction, the video becomes very popular.
6	6	"Going out Part 1"	Tomer Barzide	Tomer Barzide	December 8, 2010	S01E06
Pini finds himself on a date with Olive, so he decides to drag Tom with him in case things go wrong. Whilst waiting, Pini gets a call from Mark to go to the café, which Pini thinks he has to cook something. Tom alone, finds company in Olive.
7	7	"Night Out Part 2"	Tomer Barzide	Tomer Barzide	December 12, 2010	S01E07
After drunkenly stumbling to café, Pini meets Joseph "who is going to beat your ass and beat Marks ass". After discovering that Pini has gone to the Cafe, Olive believes Pini may be in trouble. Mark arrives and clears up the situation. We see Tom and Olive kissing on the back of a bus.
8	8	"On the Fire"	Tomer Barzide	Tomer Barzide	December 15, 2010	S01E08
Pini decides to do On the Fire (BBQ) to try and impress Carla. Tom is trying to tell Pini about Olive, and Olive is trying to hurry Tom up.
9	9	"The Right Side"	Tomer Barzide	Tomer Barzide	December 19, 2010	S01E09
Pini and Tom take a road trip up to Cambridge to see a cooking school. When they arrive Tom finds out the class was full, but Pini thought he could convince them to let him in. Running late for the car, they have a run in with a traffic warden.
10	10	"International"	Tomer Barzide	Tomer Barzide & Udi Shadmi	December 22, 2010	S01E10
Pini finds himself "invited" to Carla's stepsister, Audrey's, birthday. Whilst in Paris, Pini finds himself the centre of interest of the two French girls.
