= Celebrities Exposed =

- Genre: Documentary
- Country of origin: United Kingdom

Production
- Running time: 60 minutes (including adverts)
- Production companies: Isis Films; Scream Films; Granada Entertainment

Original release
- Network: ITV2
- Release: 2003 – 2005

Celebrities Exposed is a British television celebrity talking head documentary series that aired on ITV2 between 2003 and 2005. Repeats still occasionally air on ITV2 despite no new episodes having been made since 2005.

== Episodes ==
- "Love on the Rocks"
- "Lies, Lies, Lies"
- "Cradle Snatchers"
- "Celebrity Entourage: Inside The Locker Room"
- "Celebrity Entourage: The Powder Room "
- "Posh and Becks: For Better, For Worse?"
- "Footy, Bling and Babes"
- "Dolce and Kabbalah"
- "50 Ways to Leave Your Lover"
- "Love Machine"
- "Viva La Diva"
- "The Kids"
- "Coming Out"

== Celebrity contributors ==
- Uri Geller
- Nina Nannar
- Linda Papadopoulos
- Ben Todd
- Nick Farrari
- Polly Hudson
- Vanessa Lloyd Platt
- Angela Buttolph
- Richard Mackney
- Jo Bunting
- Louise Glover
- Lisa Jaynes
- Terry Christian
- Tony Wilson
- Karen Krizanovitch
- Shaun Keaveny
