= Kaz Kamwi =

English television personality (born 1994)

- Born: Nkazana Kamwi; 27 October 1994 (age 31); Essex, England
- Education: Birmingham City University
- Occupations: Fashion blogger; television personality
- Television: Love Island; Celebrity Karaoke Club; Love Island: All-Stars

Nkazana "Kaz" Kamwi (born 27 October 1994) is an English fashion blogger and television personality. In 2021, she was a finalist on the seventh series of Love Island and in 2022, she won the third series of Celebrity Karaoke Club. She later returned for Love Island: All-Stars in 2024.

== Life and career ==
Kamwi was born on 27 October 1994 in Essex, England. She studied sociology at Birmingham City University before becoming a full time fashion influencer and blogger. She set up a YouTube channel in May 2017 where she began posting various different videos including make-up tutorials and vlogs.

In June 2021, Kamwi became a contestant on the seventh series of Love Island. Throughout the series, Kamwi was coupled up with Toby Aromolaran, Aaron Francis and Matthew MacNabb, however it was with Tyler Cruickshank, with whom she reached the final and finished in fourth place. They began a relationship during the series, but announced their split three months after the series had ended. Kamwi later opened up about the racist abuse she received online throughout and after appearing on the show. Kamwi and her Love Island co-stars Liberty Poole, Millie Court and Liam Reardon presented the award for Newcomer at the 26th National Television Awards. In October 2021, Kamwi appeared as a guest on the +44 Podcast with Zeze Millz and Sideman and in December, was a contestant on The Weakest Link. She also appeared as a guest on the podcast Pressed in March 2022. In June 2022, Kamwi appeared on the third series of Celebrity Karaoke Club, entering the club on Day 3. Kamwi reached the final and was voted winner of the series by her fellow contestants, making her the first late entrant to win the show. In February 2023, she competed in The Challenge UK. In 2024, Kamwi returned as a contestant on the spin-off Love Island: All-Stars.

== Filmography ==
As herself
Year	Title	Notes	Ref.
2021	Love Island	Contestant	
2021	Love Island: Aftersun	Guest	
2021	26th National Television Awards	Award presenter	
2021	The Weakest Link	Contestant	
2022	Celebrity Karaoke Club	Contestant; winner	
2023	The Challenge UK	Contestant	
2024	Love Island: All-Stars	Contestant	
