= James King (film critic) =

British film critic

James King is a British film critic who presents a weekly film review show The Movie Show on ITV2 (previously known as ITV at the Movies) and also appears regularly on ITV London Tonight on Friday evenings and on Sky News as the channel's movie critic. He also appeared as the resident entertainment expert on Sky One's Angela and Friends, presented by Angela Griffin. and until March 2011 was the resident movie critic for BBC Radio 1, where he worked with Greg James on his Friday afternoon show and with Edith Bowman on her weekend breakfast shows.

Whilst with Radio 1 he became the face of the BBC's teen film-making strand, BBC Blast.

He presented the BBC Radio 1 show OneClick/Film from 2004 to 2006. In 2004, the BBC Radio 1 show James King's Movie News was nominated for a Sony Radio Academy Award in the Information Award category. In the past at BBC Radio 1 he has worked alongside Jo Whiley, has presented the Early Breakfast show, numerous Christmas Film Specials and one-off documentary programmes and has also stood-in for fellow film critic and friend Mark Kermode on Kermode and Mayo's Film Review on BBC Radio 5 Live. He also presented a weekly DVD review slot for BBC Radio 7. In 2005 he presented Homegrown Hollywood, a late-night television show on BBC2.

King made contributions to Film4's 50 Films to See Before You Die on the launch night of a free-to-air channel on 23 July 2006, as well as many other 'talking head' shows. He presented on the Eat Cinema channel and BBC Two's Learning Zone and for several years presented with Vernon Kay and Josie D'Arby on a digital TV spin-off of Top Of The Pops.

King began his broadcasting career at Radio Warwick whilst an undergraduate studying Film & Literature at the University of Warwick. He presented a radio show called "Jingus' Smash Hits" (Jingus is his nickname) and also featured in a programme created by fellow Warwick student and friend Stephen Merchant. During university vacations, King spent time as a volunteer presenter at BBC Radio Suffolk, where along with others, he presented the 'Suffolk Action Helpline' for Community Service Volunteers.

After obtaining his BA at Warwick, King went on to obtain a Post Graduate Diploma in Broadcast Journalism from University College Falmouth and an MA in Film & Television studies from the University Of Westminster. He was educated at Ipswich School, where he excelled in English Literature, is known to be a supporter of Ipswich Town and is a vegetarian. He married in 2008.

In 2004 King featured in a cameo role in the horror-comedy feature film Freak Out.
