= Schepisi =

Schepisi is a surname. Notable people with the surname include:

- Alexandra Schepisi, Australian actress
- Fred Schepisi (born 1939), Australian film director, producer, and screenwriter
- Holly Schepisi (born 1971), American lawyer, businesswoman, and politician
- Mary Schepisi (born 1949), American artist
