= Jimmy Governor =

Indigenous Australian outlaw

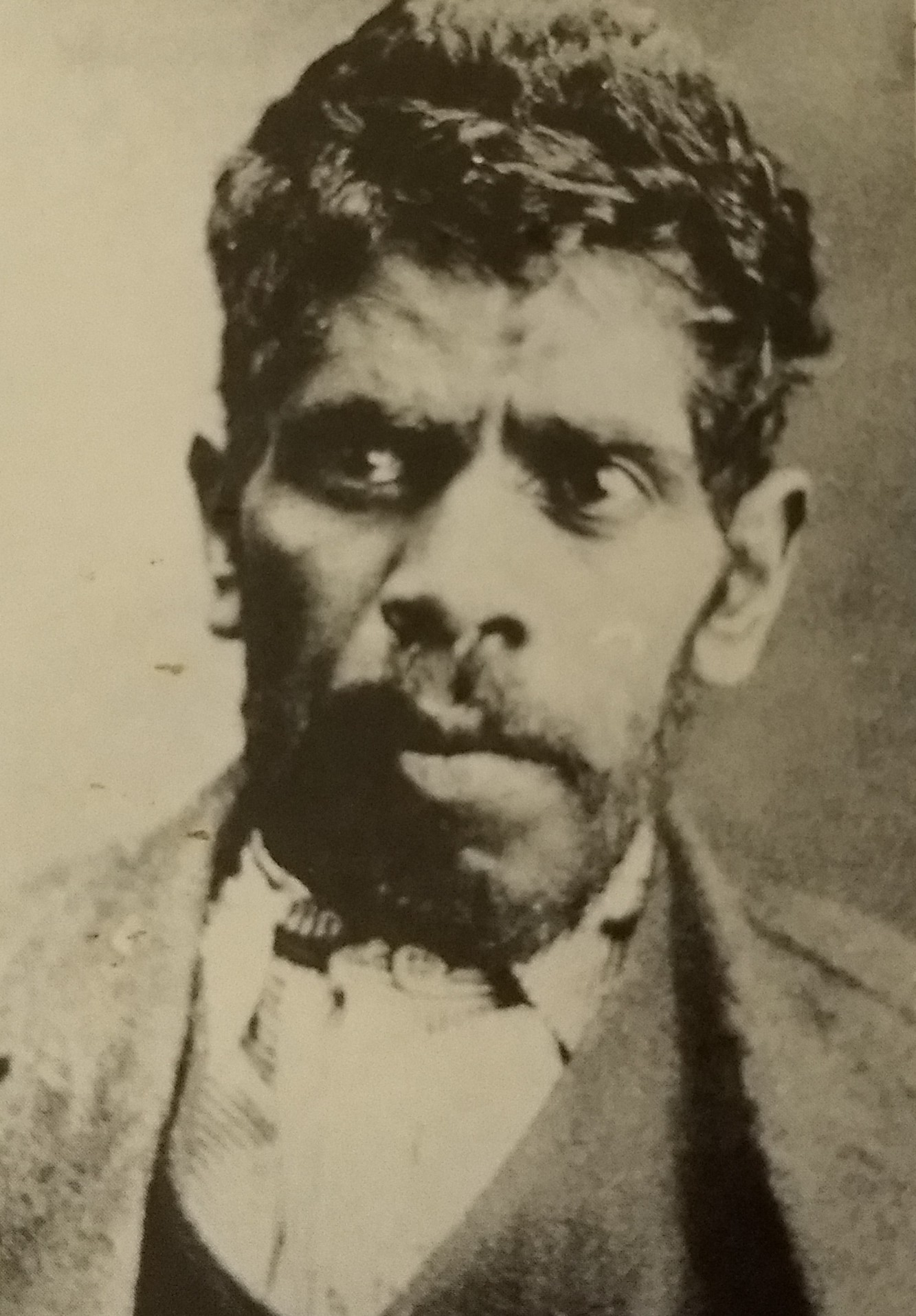
- Governor in 1900
- Born: 1875; Talbragar River, Colony of New South Wales
- Died: 18 January 1901 (aged 25–26); Darlinghurst Gaol, Sydney, New South Wales, Australia
- Cause of death: Execution by hanging
- Occupation: Fencing contractor
- Spouse: Ethel Page
- Children: Sidney Golding Louis, Thelma Violet
- Status: Outlaw
- Conviction: Murder
- Penalty: Death

Jimmy Governor (c. 1875 – 18 January 1901) was an Indigenous Australian who committed a series of murders in 1900. A total of nine people were killed by Governor or his accomplices. Governor and his brother Joe evaded police for fourteen weeks before the former was captured and the latter killed by authorities.

In July 1900, Governor and his accomplice Jack Underwood murdered four members of the Mawbey family and a schoolteacher at Breelong in what was then the Colony of New South Wales. Underwood was captured soon afterwards, but the Governor brothers took to the bush. During the period that they were at large, ranging over a large area of north-central New South Wales, the brothers committed further murders and multiple robberies. A manhunt involving hundreds of police and volunteers was initiated, with the Governors occasionally taunting their pursuers and deriding the police.

In October 1900, Governor was wounded and, a fortnight later, captured near Wingham. Four days after his brother's capture, Joe was shot and killed north of Singleton. Governor was tried for murder and hanged at Darlinghurst Gaol in January 1901.

Governor's life and crimes formed the basis for Thomas Keneally's 1972 novel The Chant of Jimmie Blacksmith, which explored themes of Aboriginal dispossession and racism. Fred Schepisi's 1978 movie of the same name was an adaptation of Keneally's novel.

== Early life ==
=== Family background ===
Jimmy Governor was born in about 1875 on the Talbragar River near Denison Town, Colony of New South Wales, the son of Tommy Governor (or Grosvenor), an Aboriginal man, and Annie Fitzgerald. Jimmy was the eldest of eight children, with four brothers and three sisters. The children attended a number of different schools as they moved from place to place contingent on Tommy being employed in various bush work.

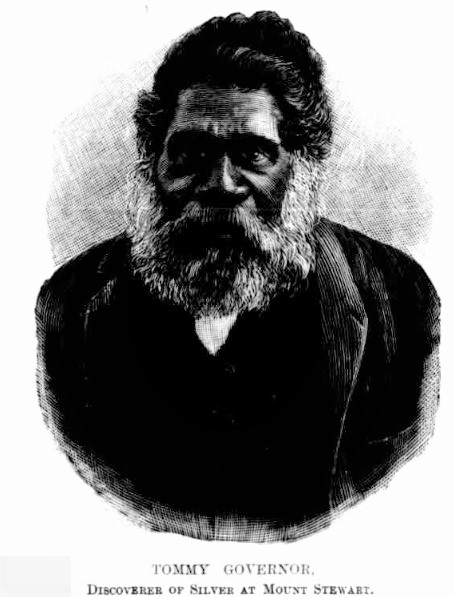
Tommy Governor

Governor's father, originally from the Namoi River region, was a hard-working and intelligent man who had arrived in the Mudgee region in the 1850s. His mother had been raised northeast of Mendooran and was the daughter of Jack Fitzgerald, a white Irish stockman, and an Aboriginal mother named Polly, who worked as a house servant. Annie's father died before her birth and she was raised by Polly and her Aboriginal stepfather, a man named Henry. Annie was described as "a half-caste, but had all the manners and customs of the pure black".

In 1887, while mending a dam east of Dunedoo, Tommy found "samples of metal-bearing ore" which he showed to George Stewart, manager of 'Pine Ridge' station. Stewart had them assayed, revealing that they contained silver, after which he took up mineral leases of 70 acres and formed a company of Mudgee businessmen to work what became known as the Mount Stewart mine. In 1888, "the original promoters of the Mount Stewart and Grosvenor leases" presented Tommy, on his departure with his family to the Paterson River district, "with a purse of sovereigns to help the old fellow on his journey". The fact that he had "received no substantial benefit" for his discovery of the "silver field" remained a source of resentment for Tommy.

Following the Governor family's 1888 relocation, Tommy and his sons worked on stations along the Paterson River, west of Dungog. They often received rations only as remuneration. Increasingly, the family were drawn into the Aboriginal reserve system which sought to confine and control indigenous people by separating them from the white population. In January 1890, family members participated in a community event at Gresford, but by the following July they were living under canvas on the St Clair reserve north of Singleton.

In August 1890, Tommy stabbed another Aboriginal man during an altercation at the Singleton "blacks' camp". He was subsequently tried and convicted on a charge of malicious wounding in the Singleton Quarter Sessions, and was sentenced to three months' imprisonment with hard labour in Maitland Gaol. Following his release, Tommy moved his family westwards back to the Gulgong district, where they set up camp on the Aboriginal reserve in the police paddock, across the creek from Wollar township.

=== Education and work ===
Schooling for the eight Governor children was irregular owing to the family's circumstances. Jimmy, the eldest, attended school at Denison Town and Wollar, and possibly also at Gulgong, Coonabarabran and Allynbrook (in the Paterson River district). A former pupil of the Wollar school recalled that Jimmy and his younger brothers Joe and Jackie "could read and write tolerably well". Jimmy was described as a "smart, athletic and cheerful native" and Joe as "rather sullen and morose".

In 1883, when white parents in Yass objected to "aboriginal and half-caste" pupils attending the public school, the local school board decreed that the indigenous children were forbidden to attend. The Minister of Public Instruction, George Reid, upheld this decision after being requested to rule on the case by the teacher at the school. This precedent determined subsequent public education policy in New South Wales whereby local objections were sufficient to preclude Aboriginal children attending a specific school.

In 1890, at age 15, Jimmy was lopping trees on properties in the Dunedoo district. Later he and his brother Joe worked along the Allyn River and in the Singleton district, doing a variety of jobs including fencing, mustering stock and breaking horses. His father's example had given Jimmy a strong work ethic and a sense of independence, and he resolved to work for wages instead of rations or handouts. At his trial Jimmy later stated, "I was never a loafer like some blackfellows", before adding: "I always worked, and paid for what I got, and I reckon I am as good as a white man".

During this period of his life, Jimmy had his first significant adverse encounter with the justice system. In February 1893 he was convicted of "stealing" at Denison Town and received a sentence of one month imprisonment. Other sources describe the offence as "horse sweating" (riding a horse without the owner's permission), a less serious offence than the actual theft of a horse.

By the mid-1890s, with his family living on the Aboriginal reserve at Wollar, Jimmy worked on stations and farms in the district. In July 1896 he enlisted as a tracker with the New South Wales Mounted Police and was stationed at Cassilis. This occupation lasted only seventeen months, with a police officer who claimed to know Jimmy stating he had left after seducing the daughter of a selector. Whatever the reason, soon after his departure a formal inspection of Cassilis police station by Superintendent Atkins revealed "everything in a fairly satisfactory condition except the conduct of the Senior Constable and Constable", which Atkins intended to bring "under the notice of the Inspector General of Police".

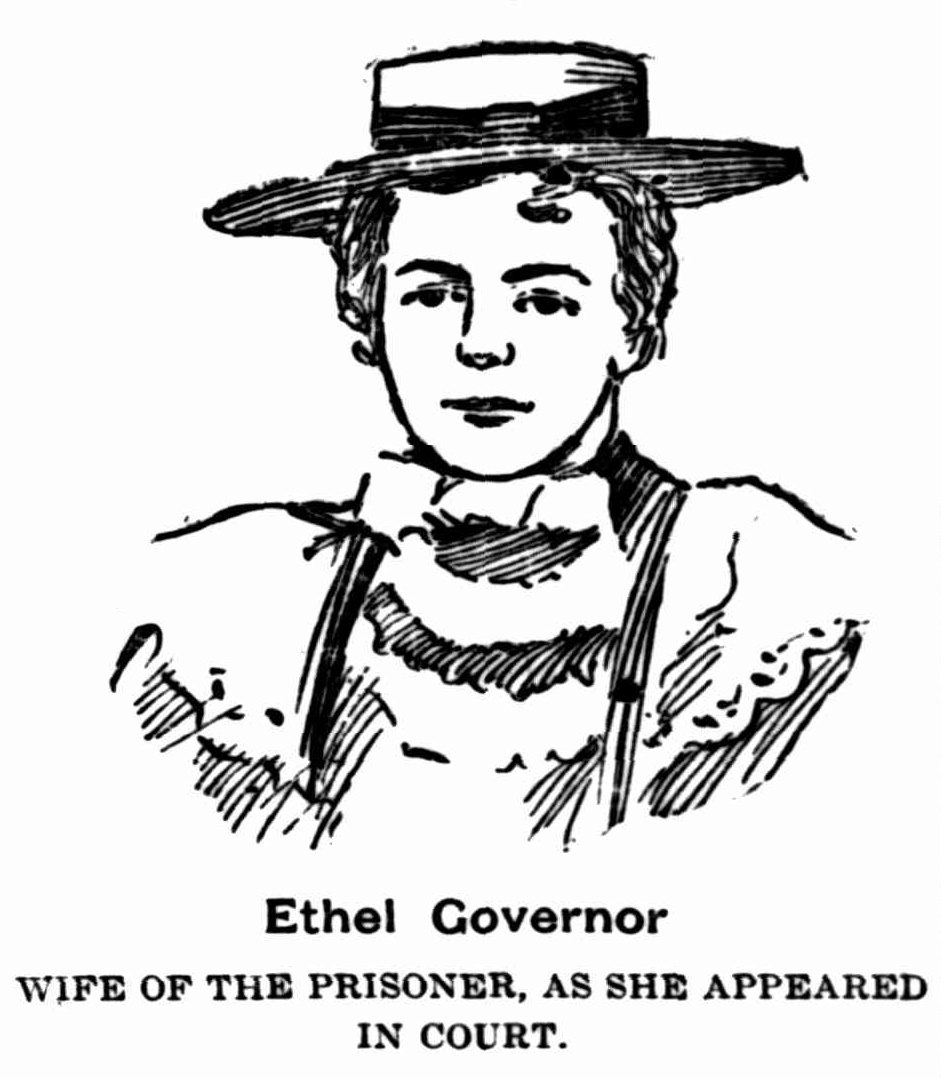
Ethel Governor, illustration published in Evening News (Sydney), 23 November 1900.

After leaving the police, Jimmy returned to Wollar and was engaged in cutting wood near Gulgong by Jonathon Starr. Then he worked as a shed-hand on 'Digilbar' station north of Dunedoo, before returning to Gulgong.

=== Marriage ===
While Jimmy was cutting wood for Starr, he met fifteen-year-old Ethel Page, who was working at Ryan's bakery in Gulgong township. Ethel had been born in 1882 in the Macleay River district near Kempsey, the eldest daughter of Charles Page and Julia (née Moore). The Page family arrived in the Gulgong district in about 1890, and by 1898 Ethel's parents were living northwest of Gulgong on the Dunedoo-Dubbo road.

In August 1898, Ethel became pregnant by Jimmy. The pair married in December in the rectory of St Luke's Anglican church at Gulgong, with Jimmy wearing a borrowed white cricket suit for the occasion. A later report claimed that the celebrant, Rev. Haviland, had only consented to perform the ceremony "at the earnest solicitation of the girl's mother, who, for reasons which may be understood, wished to save her daughter's reputation". The writer added a further comment: "One naturally wonders what manner of woman the mother was who insisted on uniting her daughter for life to a low-bred savage aboriginal". When Ethel was later asked "if she did not think it would have been better to have remained single rather than marry an aboriginal", she replied: "You might think so, but I was very fond of Jimmy".

Jimmy and Ethel lived in a house in the Gulgong district next to Ethel's parents, where she gave birth to a son named Sidney in early April 1899. Ethel's father didn't approve of the marriage and after the birth he relocated to Dubbo, where his wife and family later joined him. By the end of 1899, after a difficult year of opprobrium and disapproval of his marriage from Ethel's family as well as Gulgong locals, Jimmy determined to move his family away from the district.

== The Breelong murders ==
=== Fencing contract ===
Jimmy had met John Mawbey of 'Breelong West' when he was breaking horses in the Gilgandra district. He made contact with Mawbey, who offered him a fencing contract to commence in January 1900.

Mawbey owned a property known as 'Old Breelong' or 'Breelong West' on the Wallumburrawang Creek at its junction with the Castlereagh River, ten miles southeast of Gilgandra. The locality was once a coaching change-station on the Mendooran-Gilgandra road, and the family's first home was in the old Breelong Inn. By 1900, Mawbey's original selection had expanded to 1,500 acres and a new house had been built north of the old inn. By this stage Mawbey and his wife, Sarah, had nine children. Sarah's younger sister Elsie Clarke also lived with the family. In late January 1900, a 21-year-old teacher, Ellen Kerz (also known as Helen or Helena), joined the household. 'West Breelong' had been declared a provisional school, so Kerz boarded at the new house and taught the Mawbey siblings, as well as other children from the district, at this location. The Mawbey men slept in the inn while the women and children occupied the new house.

Jimmy and Ethel arrived at Mawbey's property in January 1900, after leaving their young baby with Ethel's parents in Dubbo. Jimmy was contracted to construct three miles of fencing, a job that would take about a year. The Governors made their camp further up the creek, about three miles from the Mawbey home and near where Jimmy would be working. The couple constructed a gunyah at the camp from bark sheets propped against a large log, and laid bark and leaves on the floor for bedding. Mawbey had agreed to supply rations of flour, meat and sugar, but any extras would be charged. The arrangement also involved Ethel working in the house several times a week as a domestic servant.

=== Grievances ===
From the outset, Ethel was subjected to ridicule and sarcasm from the women of the household, particularly Kerz, Mrs. Mawbey and her 16-year-old daughter Grace. The comments were directed at Ethel's lowly position as a domestic servant and the fact she was married to an Indigenous man. The manner in which she was treated during the day was an issue that festered and became magnified in the ensuing months.

After they had settled at Breelong, Jimmy and Ethel decided to fetch their baby and a subsequent incident seems indicative of the tensions that had developed. Ethel rode to Dubbo on a borrowed horse to collect her child; when she returned to the Mawbey homestead with the baby, it had been raining. The women took the baby to warm it by the fire. While Ethel was unsaddling the horse she watched through the window as the women ridiculed and laughed at the child. Ethel then went into the house, grabbed her baby and walked the three miles to the camp seething with anger.

In late June the Governors received a visit from Jimmy's brother Joe and a friend named Jack Underwood. Underwood was aged about 38 years; he walked with a limp and was blind in one eye. The two traveled to the Redbank Mission near Coonamble to visit family members, then returned nine days later with 80-year-old Jack Porter and the Governor brothers' young nephew, Peter. Joe and Underwood set up their camp about a hundred metres from the Governors' campsite, while Porter and Peter camped another hundred metres further away.

Bitterness towards the Mawbeys increased in Jimmy's mind as the weather turned colder at Breelong. He had complained that Mrs. Mawbey had overcharged him for rations when she compiled the bill. Another grievance arose in early July when Mr. Mawbey rejected about a hundred of the posts that had been split; after negotiation he agreed to pay half-price as "they will do for a cross fence". As the grievances began to pile up and his resentment increased, Jimmy began to fantasise about bushranging. In a statement made after his capture, he said that he, Ethel, Joe and Underwood "were talking about bushranging at night after our work was done", with the discussions taking the form of boastful talk and bravado among the men.

=== The murders ===
On the evening of Friday 20 July 1900, Jimmy and Ethel were quarrelling at their camp. Jimmy was extremely agitated, accusing Ethel and his brother Joe of being "sweet on each other". When the conversation turned to the subject of the Mawbeys, Jimmy later claimed (in evidence at his trial) that Ethel had goaded him by saying: "They rub it in; they do as they like with you", to which he replied: "You come down and I will see about it". Then, in Jimmy's words: "So we got ready and made off – me and my wife, Joe, and Jacky Underwood". By this stage it was late in the evening, between ten and eleven o'clock. At least two of the men carried weapons: Underwood carried a Winchester rifle and a tomahawk and Jimmy carried a boondi (a hardwood club). They had no bullets or gunpowder, so taking the gun suggests that the weapons at this point were being carried for the purpose of intimidation.

The group went first to the old inn, where John Mawbey, his brother-in-law Fred Clarke, and the two eldest Mawbey sons were staying. Jimmy and another man (probably Underwood) approached the inn and called for Mawbey, who came outside. Jimmy asked him for a bag of flour and a bag of sugar, to which Mawbey replied that he would provide them some time the following day.

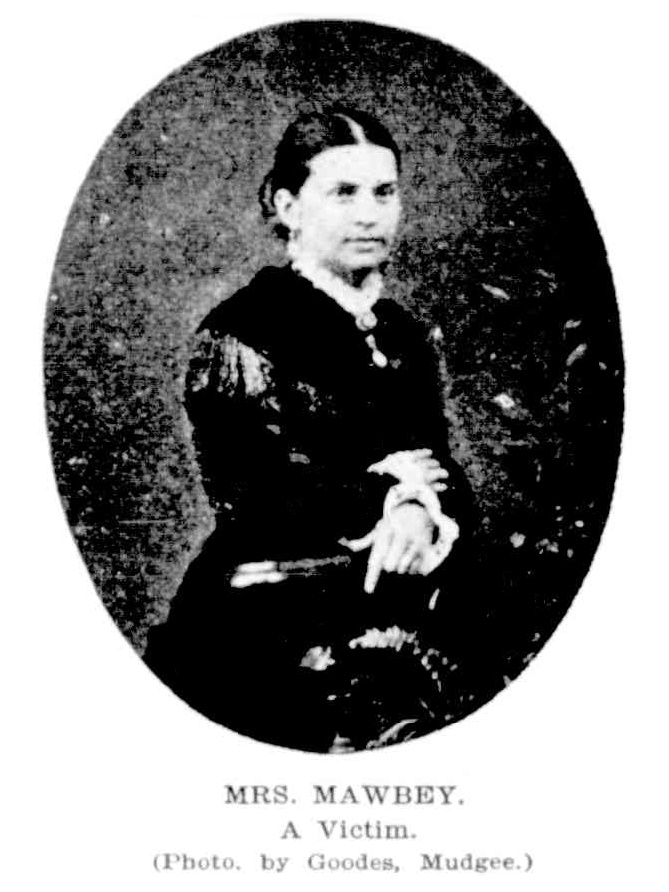
Mrs. Sarah Mawbey; published in Australian Town and Country Journal (Sydney), 4 August 1900.

By Jimmy's account he then returned to where the others were waiting and said to his wife: "I am going to see Mrs. Mawbey about those words she has been saying, I'll make her mind what she is talking about". The group then walked to the Mawbey house in order for Jimmy to confront Mrs. Mawbey. According to Jimmy's version of events, Mrs. Mawbey and Kerz came to the door, at which point Jimmy asked: "Did you tell my missus that any white woman who married a ---- blackfellow ought to be shot? Did you ask my wife about our private business? Did you ask her what sort of nature did I have – black or white?". The women (by Jimmy's account) responded "with a sneering laugh" and he then "struck Mrs. Mawbey in the mouth". Kerz is then quoted as saying: "Pooh, you black rubbish, you want shooting for marrying a white woman". Jimmy then hit Kerz on the jaw, knocking her down. In his own words he then "got out of temper and got hammering them, and lost control of myself."

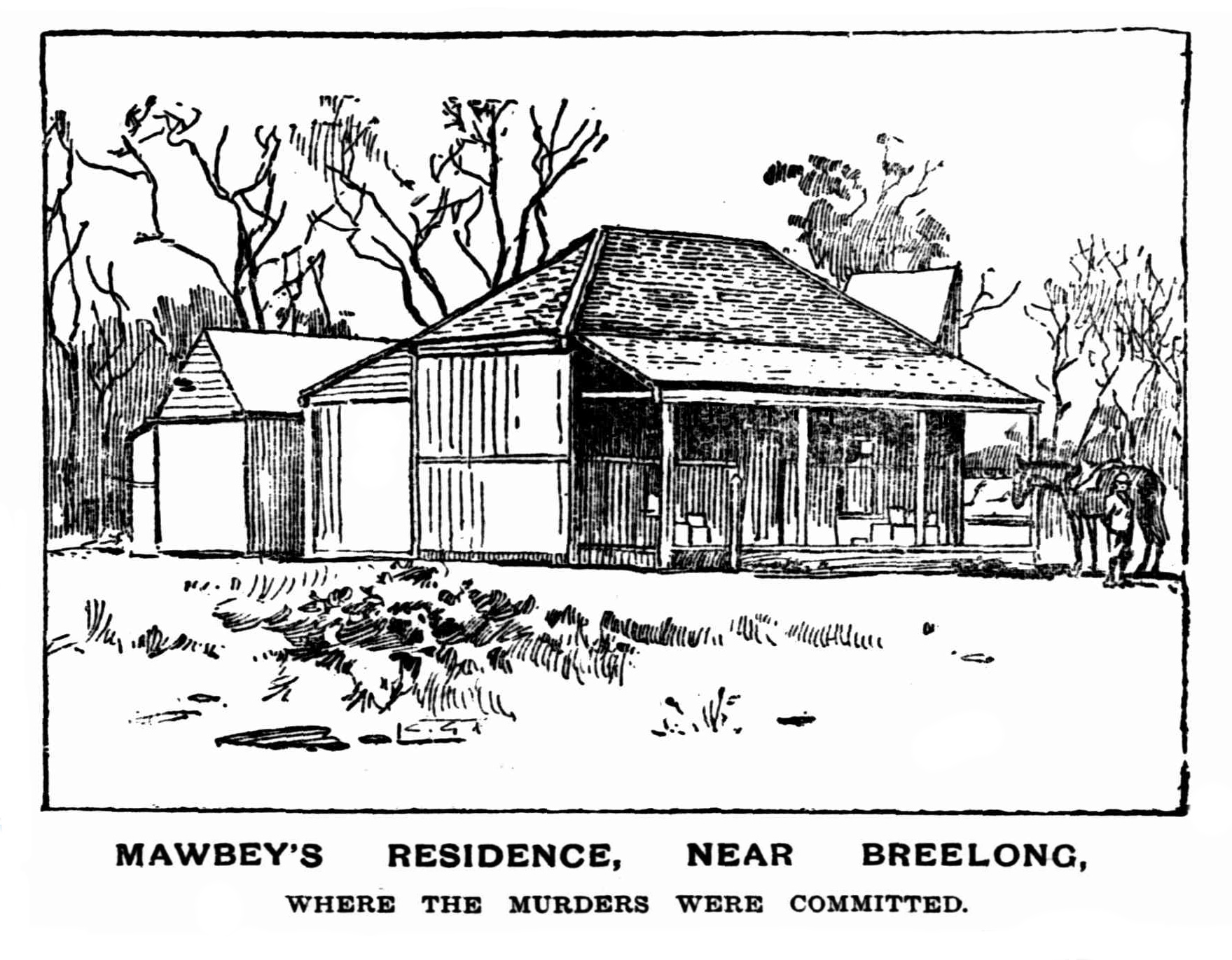
The Mawbey homestead at Breelong, the scene of the murders; illustration published in Evening News (Sydney), 26 July 1900.

Jimmy's attack set off a series of chaotic and murderous events. A panel of the front door was shattered by a tomahawk, indicating it had been closed against the assailants. Mrs. Mawbey was mortally wounded by five gashes to her neck and head inflicted by Jimmy. Kerz and 16-year-old Grace Mawbey retreated to an adjoining bedroom where Hilda Mawbey (aged 11) and Elsie Clarke were in bed. Three boys – 'Percy' Mawbey (aged 14), 'Bert' Mawbey (aged 9) and their cousin George (aged 13) – were sleeping in an enclosed verandah and woke to the noise. Jack hid under a bed and Percy went to confront the attackers but was "chopped down" by Underwood as he entered the front sitting room where his mother lay. The door to the bedroom where the women had retreated was smashed in, but Kerz and the two Mawbey girls managed to escape by climbing out a window. However, 19-year-old Elsie Clarke was caught and attacked with a boondi, receiving severe wounds to her face and head.

After they had climbed out the window, Kerz and the two girls started running towards the inn. Jimmy set off in pursuit; he caught up with Kerz and Grace, killing the former and mortally wounding the latter with blows from the tomahawk and the boondi. Hilda was ahead of the other two but stumbled and fell down the steep bank of the creek. Jimmy caught up with her and hit her with repeated blows from his boondi, leaving her head "completely crushed in".

Amidst the chaos and slaughter, young Bert Mawbey managed to slip out of the house. The terrified boy hid in the bushes near the creek for some time before running to the old inn to tell his father what had happened. Mr. Mawbey grabbed his gun and hastened to the house, closely followed by his son Reggie and Fred Clarke. They arrived barely ten minutes after the murders had begun, but the assailants had left the scene. The only family members who remained unscathed were Bert, his cousin George (who had hidden under the bed) and the two youngest children (who had been sleeping in a separate kitchen behind the house). Percy, Hilda and Kerz were dead. Grace lingered for two days before succumbing to her wounds. The children's mother, Sarah Mawbey, had suffered multiple tomahawk wounds and died on July 24. Elsie Clarke survived her injuries but was made permanently deaf from the blows she had received.

== On the run ==
=== A desperate flight ===
Jimmy and his party gathered back at their campsite before leaving as a group in "a general and desperate flight" (including Porter and the boy Peter, caught up in the panicked situation). Near sunrise Jimmy killed Porter's dog with a boondi to stop its barking and the group stopped and made a fire. Knowing his wife "could not keep up with them", Jimmy told Ethel to make her way with the baby to Dubbo. Ethel walked through the bush until she found the Dubbo road and was intercepted soon afterwards by a group of armed men riding to Gilgandra to join the hunt for the Breelong murderers. She was taken back to the Mawbey property and locked in a room in the old inn. Porter and young Peter also separated from Jimmy and the other men. They were found "cowering in the bush" on 23 July in the Boyben area, twelve miles southeast of Breelong, and taken initially to the Mendooran lock-up.

A hastily convened inquest was held over two days (July 23 and 24) at the Mawbey homestead. Surviving members of the Mawbey family, as well as Ethel and Porter, gave evidence at the hearing. Depositions were also taken from Mrs. Mawbey, who died from her wounds on the second day of the inquest. The jury returned a verdict of wilful murder against Jimmy Governor, Joe Governor, Jack Underwood, Jacky Porter and Ethel Governor. Ethel and Porter were then placed under arrest and locked up at Gilgandra police station.

During the day following the murders, the Governor brothers and Underwood, travelling southeast, reached 'Gramby' station and narrowly avoided discovery by a party of armed men. That evening near Mendooran they met a selector named Ison, who was an acquaintance of Jimmy. Ison had not heard of the murders and when Jimmy "asked for some tucker" he obliged. The next day the three fugitives were sighted by William Davidson, a sleeper-cutter, on ‘Digilah’ station, north of Dunedoo. Davidson fired several shots at the men and they escaped into the surrounding bush. A swag that was left at the scene, when unrolled, was found to contain a tomahawk and boondi, both bloodstained. In making their escape, the Governor brothers either headed in a different direction to Underwood or the older man, partially lame, had failed to keep up with the other two. In any case Underwood found himself alone.

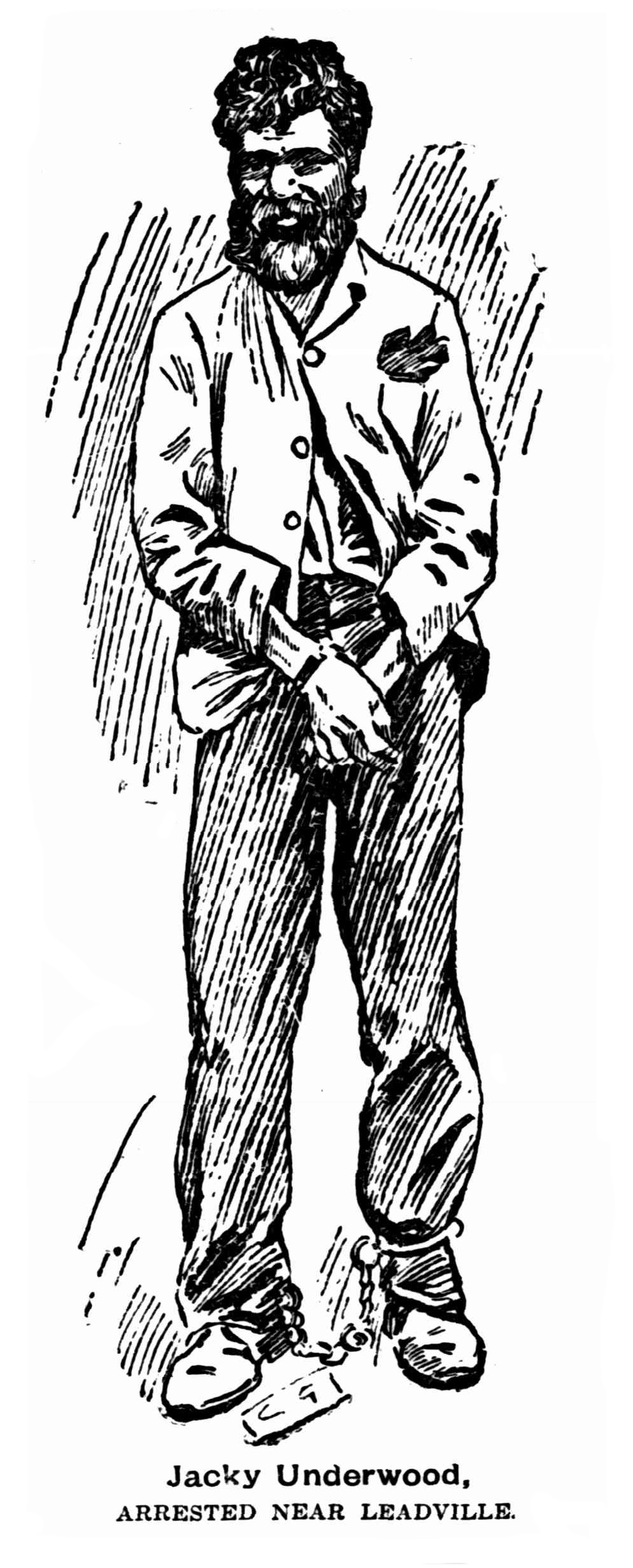
Jack Underwood in chains after being apprehended near Leadville; illustration published in Evening News (Sydney), 30 July 1900.

=== Underwood's capture and fate ===
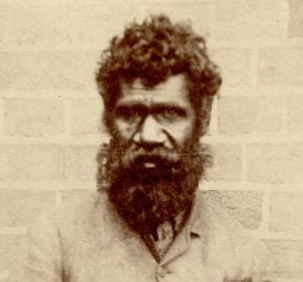
Jack Underwood, photographed after his capture in July 1900.

On Tuesday 24 July, Underwood, walking without food or blankets, called at William Shaw's selection near Leadville. Claiming his name was 'Charlie Brown', he said he had come from Wellington and hadn't eaten in three days. Shaw suspected his guest was one of the Breelong murderers and provided food and conversation while his wife proceeded to a neighbouring selection to seek assistance. Contact was made with a group searching for the fugitives, who proceeded to Shaw's selection and captured Underwood without resistance. He was taken to the lock-up at Leadville and guarded by civilians (as no police were present at the time). Two days later Underwood, under guard, was taken by coach to the gaol at Mudgee.

Underwood was initially held in custody at Mudgee with the expectation that the Governor brothers would soon be apprehended and a single trial held, but when that did not eventuate legal proceedings were initiated against him. On 18 August 1900 he was taken by train to Dubbo and thence to Gilgandra "in which district the principal witnesses reside". He appeared before the Gilgandra Police Court on August 22, charged with murdering members of the Mawbey family and Kerz at Breelong. Witnesses were examined and evidence presented, and he was committed to stand trial for murder.

Underwood was tried for the murder of Percy Mawbey at Dubbo on 2 October 1900 before Judge G. B. Simpson. The prisoner pleaded not guilty. Ethel and Porter had been held in custody until the day before the trial, but the Attorney-General dropped the charges against them as their evidence was required for Underwood's trial. Ethel gave evidence but Porter and Peter Governor were withdrawn as witnesses, as it was decided they did not understand the concept of an oath. The cousins Jack and Bert Mawbey, who survived the massacre, each gave evidence and stated they had not seen Underwood among the assailants. After an hour the jury returned a verdict of guilty but advised the court that "they could not come to a decision as to who struck the fatal blows on Percy Mawbey". Judge Simpson then passed a sentence of death on Underwood.

Underwood waited months in the cell at Dubbo Gaol before he was hanged on 14 January 1901.

=== Retribution ===
On the evening of Sunday 22 July, after the Governor brothers had separated from Underwood, they were spotted at Slapdash Creek, both riding bareback on a grey horse. That night they were given food by Charlie Wade and spent the night in a hut near Wade's house on Tallawang Creek. In the morning they headed east towards the village of Ulan, thirteen miles northeast of Gulgong.

In the early afternoon of 23 July, the brothers arrived at the farm of Alexander McKay at Sportsman's Hollow, two miles from Ulan. McKay, aged 70, was pruning a fig tree near his fence when the two men approached carrying a rifle and a tomahawk. The farmer was mortally wounded by a vicious blow from the tomahawk on the top of his head. The brothers then approached the house, calling out, "We are going to kill the lot of you!" McKay's wife Mary was on the verandah and "made a rush for the door" as Jimmy struck at her with a stick, fracturing her left temple. She managed to get inside, but the Governors broke several windows and eventually gained entry to the house. An 18-year-old woman, Louisa Jonson, was also residing with the McKays. The Governors took money and some clothes before leaving on a stolen horse and saddle. The two women discovered McKay by the fig tree "groaning pitifully". They carried him to the house, where he died soon afterwards.

The murder of McKay was the first instance of Jimmy seeking vengeance for a perceived past grievance. He had spoken of his intentions to Ethel, who later gave police a list of fifteen potential victims for Jimmy's retribution. Now, as a notorious murderer on the run, with the initial police response in relative disarray, Jimmy systematically sought out victims to settle old scores. McKay's wife was in no doubt "the motive of the crime was revenge", stating that “some years ago” her husband had reproached Jimmy "for obtaining food by false representations, when he was eluding arrest on a charge of horse stealing" (probably a reference to when Governor was charged with that offence in 1893).

After leaving the McKay farm, the Governor brothers were sighted by two boys at Byer's house near Ulan, where they took a horse (so now both brothers had mounts). Near the junction of the roads to Wollar and Cassilis, the brothers spoke to two Indian hawkers and asked them "to obtain a supply of ammunition" and leave it at a location near Wollar, adding that they intended to murder Harry Neville. That night the brothers went to Neville's 'Crowie' run north of Wollar, but he had already left having suspected he might receive a visit. The brothers broke into the empty house and stole a saddle and a gun.

The following day, Tuesday 24 July, instead of going to the proposed ammunition drop-off location (where the police were waiting) the Governor brothers headed further east. At mid-morning they arrived at Michael O'Brien's selection at Poggy, about eighteen miles southwest of Merriwa. O'Brien's wife Elizabeth, her teenaged son James and a nurse, Catherine Bennett, were sitting in the detached kitchen behind the house. Elizabeth was heavily pregnant and Mrs. Bennett was staying with her to assist with the birth. The brothers suddenly appeared at the kitchen door; Mrs. O'Brien said, "What do you want?" and Jimmy replied: "You speak civil. Surrender, or I will shoot you". With these words, Jimmy fired his gun at the women. Elizabeth and Bennett were shot several times, the former also struck by Joe's tomahawk, inflicting a fatal blow. Jimmy broke the rifle stock by using it to beat James to death. The Governors then ransacked the house, taking money, clothes and boots. On a blank cheque form they wrote: "You dog, I shoot you also". Bennett was still alive, shot with a bullet that entered her collarbone and passed through her chest. She staggered from the kitchen after her assailants had left and found Michael O'Brien, who walked to a neighbouring selection to send a rider to alert police in Merriwa. By the time the troopers had arrived, the Governor brothers Jimmy and Joe Governor had long departed, but Bennett had been laying for six hours in the bush suffering from exposure.

The supposed motive behind the attack at the O'Brien selection was a longstanding grudge held by Jimmy. Years beforehand, during a cricket match being played at Wollar, "Jimmy made a pest of himself" and O'Brien "gave him a ducking in the creek to quieten him down a bit".

On 25 July a notification was published offering a reward of two hundred pounds "for the apprehension" of each of the offenders, Jimmy Governor and Joe Governor. The notice referred to the murders "by aboriginals" at Breelong and the subsequent inquest which returned a verdict of "wilful murder" against Jimmy Governor, Joe Governor, Jack Underwood, Jack Porter and Ethel Governor.

The following day, the Governor brothers broke into an empty house belonging to Thomas Hughes, stealing a Winchester rifle and ammunition. Now in the vicinity of Wollar, they headed to Kieran Fitzpatrick's farm. Jimmy believed Fitzpatrick had poisoned his dogs years beforehand, so his was another score to settle. Fitzpatrick, aged 74, lived with his 23-year-old nephew Bernard. At mid-morning, after Bernard went to his brother's nearby, the Governors took their opportunity. Jimmy approached the house and called for Fitzpatrick, who came out with his rifle ready. Joe fired from a hiding place, hitting the old man in the shoulder. Jimmy rushed at him with an axe and struck him twice on the head. Bernard heard the shot that had been fired and returned to see the Governors still there and his uncle dead. He fired a shot at the murderers and then ran to Wollar for help.

=== Atmosphere of terror ===
A week after the murders at Breelong it was reported that "considerably over 100 police, together with twelve black trackers" were searching for the Governor brothers. It was proposed to swear in a number of special constables, with "bushmen who knew the country well" being preferred. The Colonial Secretary stated that the law authorising the colonial government to declare the murderers to be outlaws had expired, "otherwise they would have been immediately 'outlawed'" A broad region of New South Wales, lying between the Northern and Western railway systems "within the boundary of lines drawn between Gilgandra and Muswellbrook on the north and Mudgee and Newcastle on the south", was now on high alert. The resources of every police station within that area were being called upon. It was reported that business "on the farms or in the shops is practically at a standstill, and those who are not engaged in the active work of search and pursuit spend their time in speculation and discussion of the tragedies and their perpetrators". Settlers moved out of their homesteads in fear of the Governors, with women and children brought together in towns for safety while many of the men joined the pursuit.

After the Fitzpatrick killing outside Wollar, and the fact that the Governors' mother and younger siblings were living on the Aboriginal reserve at Wollar, the township became a focus of attention by the police and the colonial press. A visitor in late July noted: "When we rode into the town we met men armed to the teeth, riding round looking out sharply for any sign of the blacks". The police had brought all the local aborigines into the township in order to keep them under surveillance. At night they were locked up in a hall which had been "appropriated for their accommodation". Such was the fear and panic in the Wollar district that "families from up and down the Wollar Creek have flocked into town, and every available place is crammed with humanity".

A visitor to the Merriwa and Cassilis district in late July recounted that "the people are terror-stricken for miles around, and nearly every person is carrying firearms in fear of meeting the blacks". It was stated that every hut and house in the Wollar Ranges district "has been vacated" and it was "next to impossible to obtain a bed" at any of the hotels in Merriwa or Cassilis. Outlying settlers in the Coolah district were reported to have "deserted their houses, and are stopping in the town at hotels, and private houses are packed". It was observed that local stores had completely sold out of rifles. Jimmy had frequently been in Coolah and it was feared he would "visit persons with whom he has quarrelled".

=== Manhunt ===
On July 29, a Chinaman's hut was robbed near Gulgong. The following day, the Governors were seen at Two Mile Flat, twelve miles from Gulgong. Later they were camped near the village of Yamble when a party of pursuers surprised them while they were preparing a meal. The tracks of the fugitives were lost at the Cudgegong River near Goolma, and for about a week no information of their whereabouts was obtained. By this time large numbers of police and civilian volunteers had joined the search, including six black trackers from Queensland under the charge of Sub-inspector Galbraith of Ipswich.

Over the next three months the Governor brothers, styling themselves bushrangers, carried on a series of break-ins, robberies and assaults. They showed great skill, ingenuity and bush craft in eluding their pursuers. The manhunt that got underway to capture them was reputedly Australia's largest, estimated to have involved over 200 police and trackers and about 2,000 armed civilian volunteers.

The reward was increased on 25 September 1900 to £1,000 each. As the brothers outwitted and even taunted the police and trackers hunting them, public pressure grew for the police to capture them. The government instituted a process on 2 October 1900 to proclaim the brothers outlaws so that, when they failed to appear at a police station by the afternoon of 16 October 1900, they could legally be shot and killed on sight. They were proclaimed outlaws on 23 October 1900, the last persons to be so declared in New South Wales.

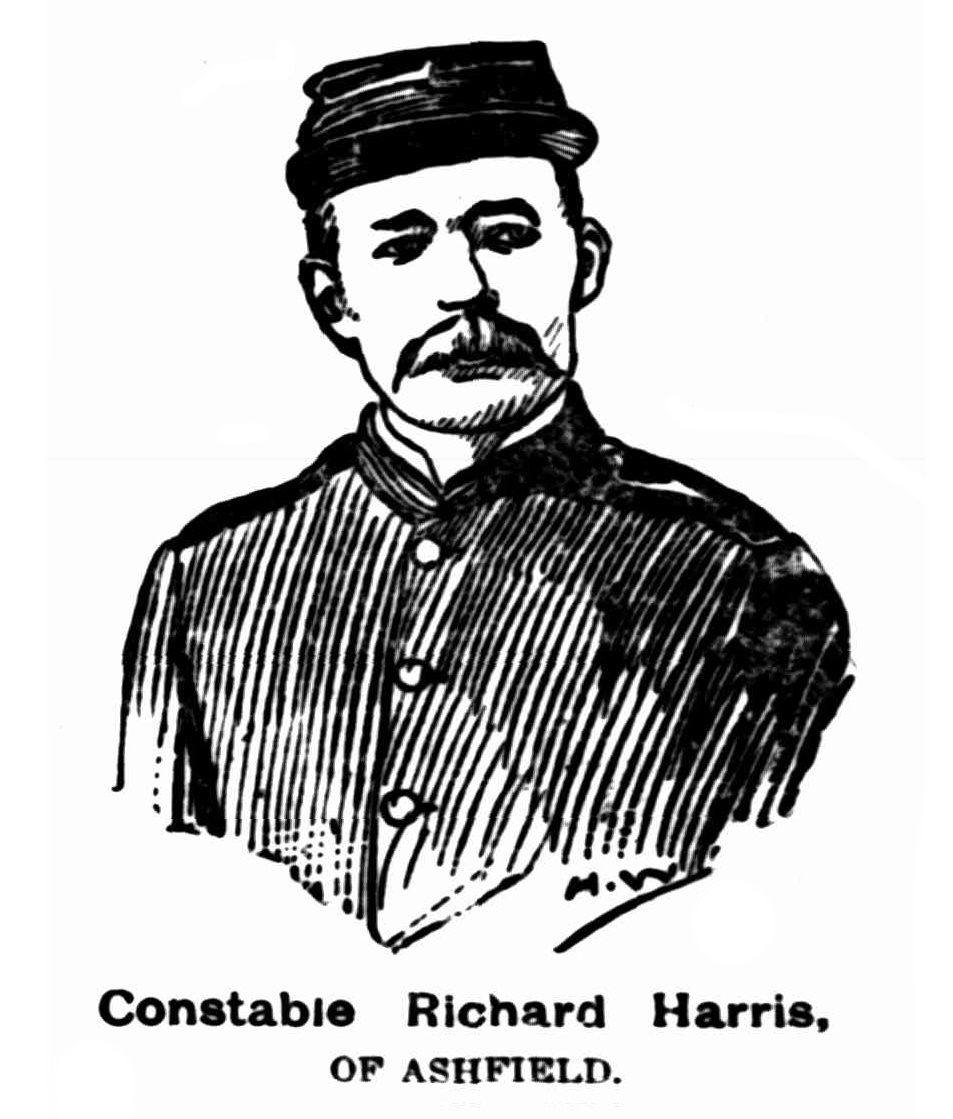
Constable Richard Harris of the Sydney police force, shot in the hip during the pursuit of the Governor brothers; illustration published in Evening News (Sydney), 15 October 1900.

On Friday 12 October, Constable Richard Harris, a Sydney police officer stationed at Ashfield, and a tracker named Landsborough were occupying the hut of a selector named O'Doherty, three miles from Yarras at the junction of the Hastings River and Lahey's Creek. At about four o'clock in the afternoon, they heard movements outside and then saw a rifle flash as Harris was hit in the hip by a bullet fired through an opening between the slabs. The bullet passed through his flesh and struck the wall of the hut. Harris and Landsborough rushed outside and saw the brothers running towards the creek "and dodging from tree to tree". Shots were exchanged and Harris claimed to have hit Jimmy. Harris bandaged his wound and walked to a nearby selection, from where he was taken to Port Macquarie for medical treatment.

On the following day, the Governor brothers were following the Forbes River. Three men were stationed in a house on Edward Coombe's selection at Big Flat, placed there by the police in anticipation of a visit by the fugitives. Two of the men were Herbert Byers, a kangaroo shooter from Ulan, and Robert Wood from Mudgee, both of whom had been involved in the hunt for the brothers since late-July. At mid-afternoon the brothers were sighted descending the ridge from the south and onto the flat where the house was located. They approached the house slowly, moving from cover to cover, until they were within 60 yards. Wood and Byers held their fire, expecting them to come even closer. Suddenly the two fugitives became alarmed and "made a bolt", running to the south. At about 140 yards from the house, as Jimmy stopped to look back, Byers took a shot through a crack in the wall. Jimmy fell and rolled over; the bullet had hit his mouth and passed through his cheek, knocking out four of his teeth. Wood also fired, the shot passing through the flesh of Jimmy's buttock. Byers and Wood ran from the house, exchanging fire with Joe. Jimmy raised himself, stumbled and fell again, but eventually he and his brother escaped into the surrounding forest. Byers and Wood followed for about half a mile but discontinued the chase as the light began to fade.

With Jimmy wounded, he and Joe camped in the bush for the next three days. On the evening of Tuesday 16 October, ten miles from where Jimmy had been wounded, the Governors stuck up 19-year-old William Coombes as he was chopping wood on his family's selection on the Forbes River. They took him at gunpoint to William's uncle's selection about a mile away and asked him to go to the house and "get some tucker", saying they would meet him "on the opposite side of the river". The house was being guarded by a Constable Dolman and others, and the policeman "prevented young Coombes returning to the murderers with food" and also made the decision not to search for the brothers in the dark. Coombes reported that Jimmy's condition was weak and he was not able to walk fast. His bottom lip was cut and hanging down, his tongue was swollen and his face and mouth were bandaged.

The following day, Wednesday 17 October, the Governors were sighted near George Branston's house on the Hastings River, two miles west of Yarras. Constable Young and a tracker were stationed in the house. Joe Governor was on the opposite bank and Jimmy was in the riverbed when Young and the tracker started firing at them. In the chaos of the shootout, the brothers became separated. In Jimmy's words: "Joe ran away down the other side of the river, and that was the last I saw of my brother". The police strategy of occupying houses and denying the outlaws opportunities for obtaining food had achieved some significant results.

=== Jimmy Governor's capture ===
After he was separated from his brother, Jimmy walked across the mountains further to the south. Joe was travelling in the same direction, but he kept moving whereas Jimmy remained in the district around Bobin. Jimmy was in a weakened state, barely able to eat due to the wound in his mouth; in his own words, after being shot he had "nothing to eat for 14 days but honey and water". He had a Winchester rifle, but only two bullets. For about a week he remained hidden near Bobin, dispirited and looking for food to scrounge.

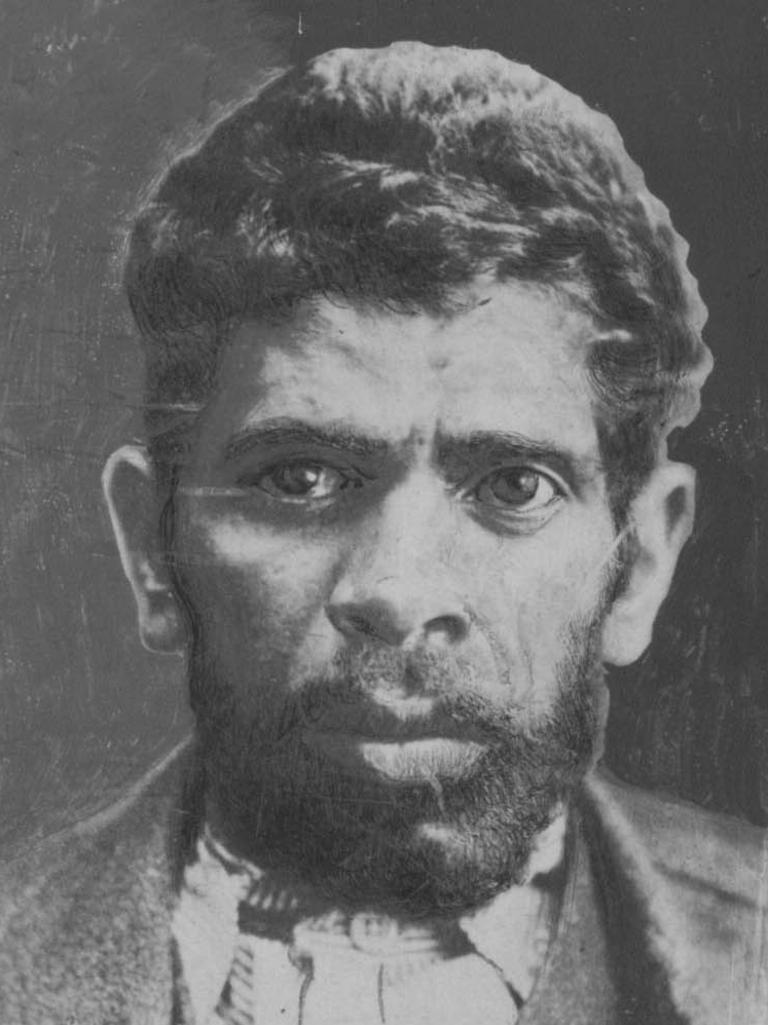
Jimmy Governor, photographed after his capture.

On Friday 27 October, John Wallace, the postmaster at Bobin, was camped on his selection on Bobin Creek, a mile and a half from the village. After returning from a visit to a neighbour at mid-afternoon, Wallace found that his tucker-bag and billy were gone. Suspecting he had been robbed by one of the Governors, Wallace caught his horse and returned to Bobin, after which he walked back through the scrub on the opposite bank of the creek and lay concealed, watching his campsite from a distance of about 60 yards. At dusk, in Wallace's words: "I saw a darkey come walking leisurely along to the fire". After ascertaining that the man intended "to make the fire his camping place for the night", Wallace returned to the village and gathered a party of seven other men. After planning their hiding-places so none could be hit by crossfire, the men took their positions by about 3:00 am Saturday morning and waited for daybreak.

Just on daylight Jimmy stood up, fifty yards higher up the creek than expected and only 20 yards from where one of the party, Tom Green, was stationed. When Green called out "surrender", Jimmy grabbed his rifle and started running up the creek, with Green and Wallace in pursuit and firing with breechloading shotguns. After a chase of about 200 yards, with the others in the party closing in and firing, the outlaw finally fell when Green shot him in the thigh. Two members of the party were sent to Wingham to report the capture to the police. Jimmy laid "as if insensible" for over an hour, after which he began to move. Leaning on his elbow, he said: "I give you fellows credit for catching me. The ----- police could not run down a poddy calf". Wallace returned to Bobin to get a spring-cart while the others carried their prisoner to the road, and Jimmy was taken by cart to Wingham. Jimmy's captors had fired at him with slugs and shot, so his wounds on this occasion were mainly superficial. In all forty pellets were extracted from his body.

On Tuesday 30 October, Jimmy was brought before the Police Magistrate at Wingham and charged with the murder of Ellen Josephine Kerz. Evidence at the hearing was mainly concerned with formal identification of the prisoner and accounts of admissions by Jimmy of having committed the crimes at Breelong. When asked if he wished to question the witnesses, "Jimmy replied in the negative by quietly shaking his head". The police superintendent then formally applied for the remand of the prisoner to Sydney, which was granted. On 2 November Jimmy Governor was conveyed to Sydney aboard the steamer Electra. During the voyage he "occupied the time in playing cards with his custodians". Electra arrived in Sydney on the following evening and Jimmy was taken to Darlinghurst Gaol.

=== Joe Governor's death ===
On the night of Tuesday 30 October, John Wilkinson of 'Glenrock' on Talbrook Creek was walking across his paddock towards his brother George's residence when he noticed a fire burning in a nearby gully. Later that night, Wilkinson and his brother, with just one rifle between them, went to investigate. The country near the fire was "very rough and precipitous, although not heavily timbered". When they got near, they could see a man asleep beside the fire. While his brother withdrew to the top of a hill to keep watch, Wilkinson, with the rifle, worked his way forward taking advantage of available cover as day began to break. Finding himself only about fifteen yards away, he decided that "hesitating might mean disaster" and so he ran towards the sleeper calling out "surrender". Joe Governor jumped up and Wilkinson fired, but "the cartridge hung fire" and the bullet missed. Joe grabbed for his rifle but was unable to reach it as Wilkinson charged forward, "so the fugitive darted away for dear life". Wilkinson chased Joe through the hills and ravines, firing several times but missing on each occasion. Eventually, with Joe about 120 yards distant, Wilkinson stopped and went down on one knee, took careful aim and fired. With that shot, Joe fell dead over the bank of the creek.

== Jimmy Governor's trial and execution ==
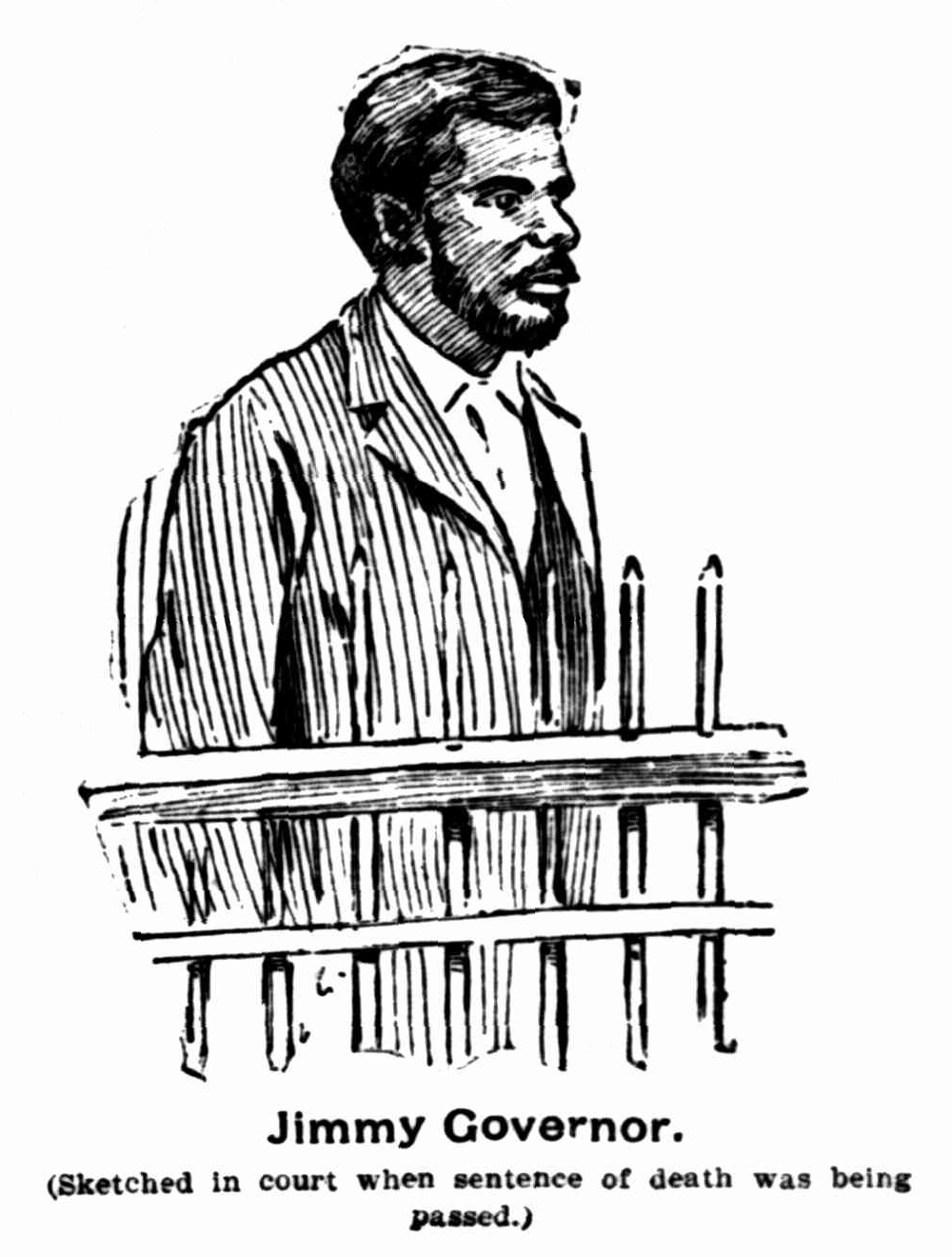
Jimmy Governor in the dock as the sentence of death was being passed; published in Evening News (Sydney), 18 January 1901.

Jimmy was arraigned before Judge Owen at the Sydney Central Criminal Court in Darlinghurst on 22 November 1900, charged with the murder of Ellen Josephine Kerz. He was defended by Francis S. Boyce, who immediately moved for the acquittal of the prisoner based on the fact that he was a declared outlaw and hence "the accused is not able to plead and defend himself against the indictment" (in effect, already guilty in the eyes of the law). The judge disagreed, holding that the object of the declaration of outlawry was to bring about the person's capture "for the purpose of putting him on trial". The jury returned a verdict in accordance with the judge's direction and was discharged. Another jury was then empanelled to try the case based on the evidence.

Testimony for the prosecution on the first day of the trial was given by John Mawbey, followed by Mawbey's nephew George and son Albert (who had been in the house during the murders). Ethel also gave evidence, together with a number of other witnesses. The case for the defence on the following day consisted of a written statement that Boyce requested be read on behalf of the accused as he "cannot read well". The prosecutor objected to this and the judge ruled that the statement "must be given orally" by the prisoner. Governor then read his statement to the court. After both counsels' closing addresses and a summing up by Judge Owen, the jury retired and returned after just ten minutes to return a verdict of guilty on the charge of murder. The prisoner was then asked if he had anything to say as to why the Court should not pass a sentence of death upon him. Jimmy "grasped the iron railings of the dock as he stood and shook his head"; after drinking water from a pannikin handed to him by an attendant constable, he "said in a weak voice, 'No, nothing'". Judge Owen then sentenced the prisoner to be hanged.

After almost three and a half months in his cell at Dubbo Gaol, Jack Underwood was hanged on 14 January 1901. After the execution the hangman, Robert ('Nosey Bob') Howard, travelled back to Sydney to supervise the hanging of Underwood's partner in the Breelong murders. Jimmy Governor was hanged on the morning of 18 January 1901 at Darlinghurst Gaol. The certifying doctor was Robert T. Paton.

== Aftermath ==
A little more than a month after Jimmy's execution, wax figures of "Joe and Jimmy Governor and their victims" were exhibited at The Waxworks at Kalgoorlie in Western Australia.

After she was released from gaol prior to Underwood's trial in October 1900, Ethel Governor and her child were admitted to a charitable institution in Sydney. She visited her husband in prison on a number of occasions prior to his execution. Ethel was pregnant and gave birth to a daughter in April 1901 at Wollongong. In November that year she married a part-Aboriginal man, Frank Brown, prompting racist comments in the press. One article declared: "The second marriage is just as repulsive as the first, for the bride groom is a half-caste, and in spite of all her faults the woman is white"; the article concluded that the "inevitable consequence" of the marriage "will be the completion of the damnation of her soul, and addition to the piebald of 'A White Australia'". Ethel and Frank had eleven children. Ethel outlived her second husband; she died in October 1945 and was buried in Rookwood cemetery.

== Murder victims ==
- Sarah Mawbey, wife of John Mawbey (Breelong, 24 July)
- Ellen (or Helen, Helena) Kerz, schoolteacher (Breelong, 20 July)
- Grace Mawbey, 16-year-old daughter of John and Sarah (Breelong, 22 July)
- Percival Mawbey, 14-year-old son of John and Sarah (Breelong, 20 July)
- Hilda Mawbey, 11-year-old daughter of John and Sarah (Breelong, 20 July)
- Alexander McKay, property-owner (near Ulan, 23 July)
- Elizabeth O'Brien (near Merriwa, 24 July)
- James O'Brien, baby son of Elizabeth O'Brien (near Merriwa, 24 July)
- Keiran Fitzpatrick, property-owner (near Wollar, 26 July)

== Cultural influence ==
The founding headmaster of The Southport School, the Rev (later Rt Rev) Horace Dixon, was nicknamed 'Jimmy' by the schoolboys in 1903 after Governor, and was known as 'Jimmy' for the rest of his life.

The story of the Governors was adapted for radio in 1934 as an episode of the series Outlawry Under the Gums but the episodes were cancelled out of fear of offending the Aboriginal community.

The life and crimes of Jimmy Governor was the basis for Frank Clune's book Jimmy Governor (1959) and Thomas Keneally's 1972 novel The Chant of Jimmie Blacksmith, which was filmed by Fred Schepisi in 1978.

Governor was also the subject of Australian poet Les Murray's poem "The Ballad of Jimmy Governor".

In September 2021, a 3-part Australian crime podcast called The Last Outlaws was released, detailing the brothers' story. It was produced by Impact Studios at the University of Technology Sydney. It was made in collaboration with descendants of the Governor family, the Jumbunna Institute for Indigenous Education and Research and the UTS Faculty of Law.

The Podcast series won numerous awards and preceded the publication of The Last Outlaws book written by Katherine Biber in 2025.

Jimmy Governor and his family feature in the 2022 book, Boundary Crossers: the hidden history of Australia's other bushrangers (NewSouth) by Dr Meg Foster. This book shines light on Australian bushrangers who were not white men, and shows how legacies of colonialism impacted bushranging history and its afterlife. Foster also wrote a book chapter about a bush ballad featuring Governor as well as an article highlighting the impact of Governor's crimes on his First Nations family in the rural town of Wollar. This piece was the first to show how white Australians feared an Indigenous uprising in 1900, and won the 2018 Aboriginal History award from the History Council of NSW.

== See also ==
- List of Indigenous Australian historical figures
