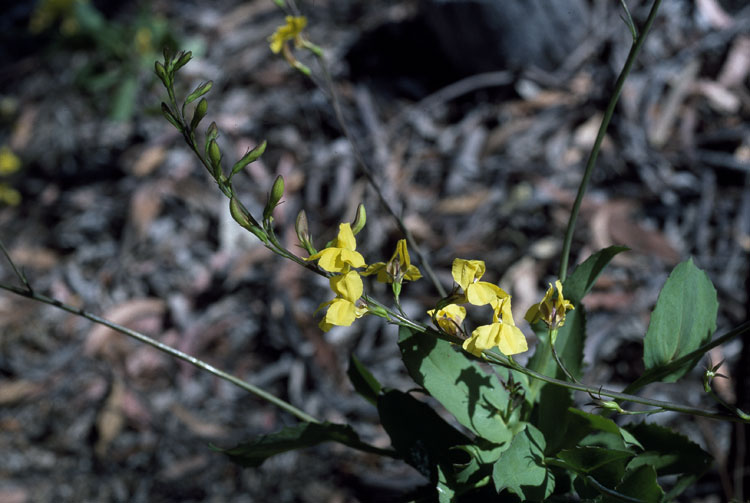
- In the ANBG

Scientific classification
- Kingdom: Plantae
- Clade: Tracheophytes
- Clade: Angiosperms
- Clade: Eudicots
- Clade: Asterids
- Order: Asterales
- Family: Goodeniaceae
- Genus: Goodenia
- Species: G. decurrens

Binomial name
- Goodenia decurrens R.Br.

= Goodenia decurrens =

Species of plant

Goodenia decurrens is a species of flowering plant in the family Goodeniaceae and is endemic to New South Wales. It is an erect, glabrous undershrub with lance-shaped to elliptic, toothed leaves, yellow flowers arranged in racemes or thyrses, and oval fruit.

== Description ==
Goodenia decurrens is an erect, glabrous undershrub that typically grows to a height of 80 cm (31 in). The leaves are decurrent, sessile, lance-shaped to elliptic, 50–100 mm (2.0–3.9 in) long, 10–25 mm (0.39–0.98 in) wide with toothed edges. The flowers are arranged in racemes or thyrses up to 450 mm (18 in) long with linear to lance-shaped bracts up to 10 mm (0.39 in) long at the base, each flower on a pedicel up to 10 mm (0.39 in) long. The sepals are narrow egg-shaped, 4–7 mm (0.16–0.28 in) long and the petals are yellow, 15–18 mm (0.59–0.71 in) long. The lower lobes of the corolla are 7–8 mm (0.28–0.31 in) long with wings 2–3 mm (0.079–0.118 in) wide. Flowering mainly occurs from October to March and the fruit is an oval capsule about 9 mm (0.35 in) long.

== Taxonomy and naming ==
Goodenia decurrens was first formally described in 1810 by Robert Brown in Prodromus Florae Novae Hollandiae et Insulae Van Diemen. The specific epithet (decurrens) refers to the decurrent leaves.

== Distribution and habitat ==
This goodenia grows on sandstone cliffs in forest between Blackheath and Wollar in New South Wales.
