= Alexandra Schepisi =

Australian actress (born c. 1977)

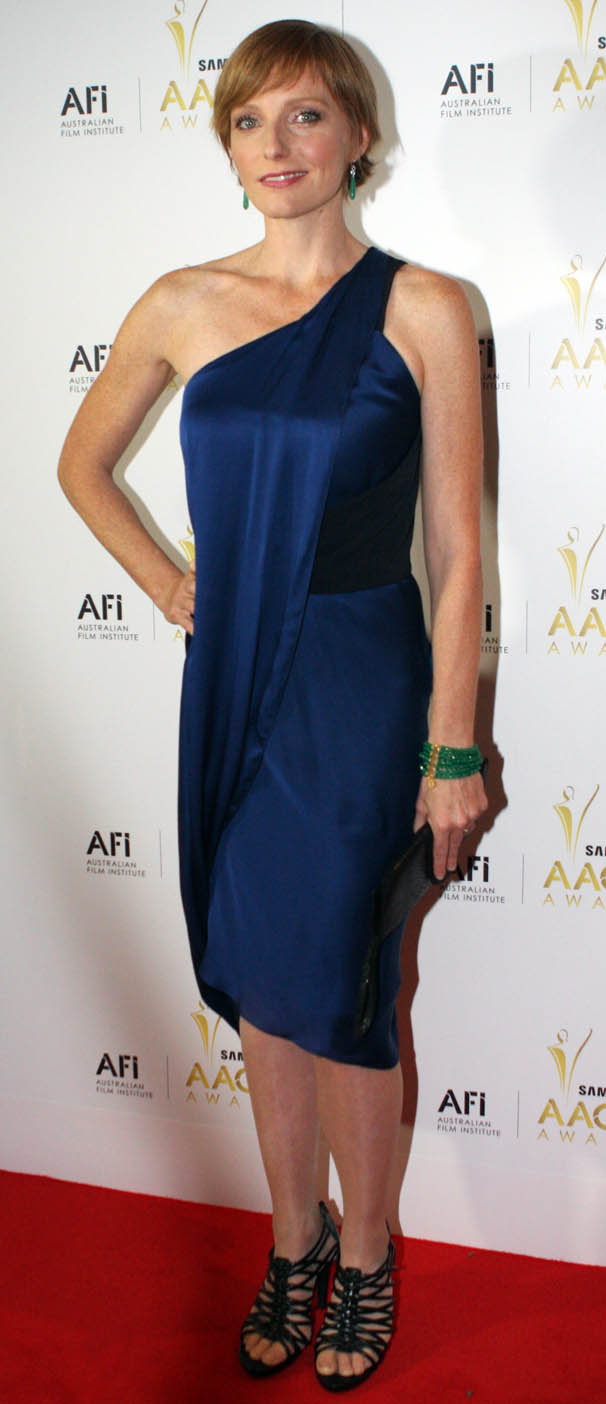
- Schepisi at the AACTA Awards in Sydney, Australia on January 15, 2012
- Born: c. 1977
- Education: Victorian College of the Arts
- Occupation: Actress
- Years active: 1978; 1994–present
- Father: Fred Schepisi
- Family: Mary Schepisi (stepmother); Jon Finlayson (uncle)

Alexandra Schepisi (/ˈskɛpsi/ SKEP-see) (born c. 1977) is an Australian actress.

== Early life ==
Schepisi was born and raised in Melbourne, Victoria, Australia. She is the daughter of filmmaker Fred Schepisi and casting director Rhonda (nee Finlayson) Schepisi; through her mother, she is the niece of actor, writer and director Jon Finlayson. She obtained her bachelor's degree in dramatic art from Victorian College of the Arts in 1997.

== Career ==
Schepisi made her acting debut as a baby, a cameo as the axe murdered Baby Hersey in the 1978 drama film The Chant of Jimmie Blacksmith, which her father scripted, directed and filmed in mid-1977. In 2011, as an adult, she appeared in another film of her father's, The Eye of the Storm (2011).

Schepisi has performed on stage, including the Melbourne Theatre Company production A Doll's House.

Schepisi has appeared in a number of Australian films and television shows. Her TV acting credits include The Secret Life of Us (2001), MDA (2002), Underbelly (2008), and Devil's Dust (2012). On the other hand, she starred in films The Boys Are Back (2009), Matching Jack (2010).

Schepisi has directed two short films.

== Filmography ==
=== Films ===
Year	Title	Role	Notes
1978	The Chant of Jimmie Blacksmith	Baby Healey	cameo, while a baby
2007	Little Deaths	Emma	
2009	The Boys Are Back	Birthday Party Mother	
2010	Matching Jack	Janice	
2011	The Eye of the Storm	Flora Manhood	

=== Television ===
Year	Title	Role	Notes
1994	Baby Bath Massacre	Amber	TV movie
1994, 1998, 2003	Blue Heelers	Melissa / Stephanie White / Pam Patterson	3 episodes (1994 as Alex Schepisi)
1995	Eat My Shorts	Lisa	Episode: "Smile a Ton"
1998	State Coroner	Dr. Ann Gerome	Episode: "The Gift of Life"
1998	SeaChange	Imogen Wilkes	Episode: "Looking Forward to the Past"
1999	Witch Hunt	Linda Thomas	TV movie
2002	MDA	Edwina 'Ed' Davis	Recurring role (season 1)
2004–2005	The Secret Life of Us	Lucy Beckwith	Main cast (season 4)
2005	Last Man Standing	Bonnie	2 episodes
2005	Heartbreak Tour	Carmen	TV movie
2008	Underbelly	Mishy Merceica	2 episodes
2009	City Homicide	Alexandra Misto	Episode: "The Forgotten"
2011	My Place	Granny Sarah / Sarah	Recurring role (season 2)
2012	Devil's Dust	Karen Banton	2 episodes
2012	Jack Irish: Black Tide	Meryl Canetti	TV movie
2014	House Husbands	Sienna	Episode: "3.12"
2017	The Leftovers	The Woman	Episode: "The Book of Kevin"
2020	Wentworth	Cynthia Rattray	Recurring role (season 8)
2021	The Newsreader	Caroline Gibson	Episode: "No More Lies"
2022	Lessons for LiveStream	Amanda	Episode: "Caller Feedback"
2023	Crazy Fun Park	Felicity	Recurring role (season 1)
2025	The Narrow Road to the Deep North	Helen Lansbury	1 episode

== Awards ==
Year	Award	Title	Category	Outcome	Source
2011	Australian Academy of Cinema and Television Arts	The Eye of the Storm	Best Actress in a Supporting Role	Nominated	
2012	Film Critics Circle of Australia	The Eye of the Storm	Best Supporting Actress	Won	
