= Acacia wollarensis =

Wollar wattle

Scientific classification
- Kingdom: Plantae
- Clade: Tracheophytes
- Clade: Angiosperms
- Clade: Eudicots
- Clade: Rosids
- Order: Fabales
- Family: Fabaceae
- Subfamily: Caesalpinioideae
- Clade: Mimosoid clade
- Genus: Acacia
- Species: A. wollarensis

Binomial name
- Acacia wollarensis S.A.J.Bell & Driscoll

Species of legume

Acacia wollarensis commonly known as Wollar wattle, is a flowering shrub in the family Fabaceae and is endemic to New South Wales. It is an upright, small to large tree with yellow ball flowers.

== Description ==
Acacia wollarensis is a small to large tree 12–20 m (39–66 ft) high with greyish, smooth bark when young but maturing to rough and creased with age. The smaller branches are terete with broad sometimes indistinct ridges and spreading, white hairs. Leaves mid-green when mature, evenly pinnate, more or less sessile, densely hairy, petiole 0.2–0.4 cm (0.079–0.157 in) long. Flowers are borne in leaf axils, yellow, globose, about 24-31 in terminal racemes and panicles. Flowering occurs from September to November and the fruit is a straight or curved pod.

== Taxonomy and naming ==
Acacia wollarensis was first formally described in 2017 by Stephen Bell and Colin Driscoll and the description was published in Telopea.The specific epithet 'wollarensis' is a reference to the parish of Wollar where it is found.

== Distribution and habitat ==
Wollar wattle has a restricted distribution it grows in sheltered gullies and lower slopes near Wollar in New South Wales.

== See also ==
- List of Acacia species
