= Breelong, New South Wales =

Breelong
- Coordinates: 31°26′20″S 148°54′40″E
- Country: Australia
- State: New South Wales
- LGA: Gilgandra Shire
- Location: 486 km (302 mi) NW of Sydney; 108 km (67 mi) N of Dubbo; 43 km (27 mi) NE of Gilgandra

Government
  - State electorate: Barwon
  - Federal division: Parkes

Population
  - Total: 85 (SAL 2021)
- Postcode: 2817

Breelong, New South Wales is a bounded rural locality of Gilgandra Shire and a civil parish of Gowen County, New South Wales.

== Geography ==
The Parish is on the junction of the Wallumburrawang Creek and the Castlereagh River, and the nearest settlement of the parish is Gilgandra, New South Wales to the west. The main economic activity of the parish is agriculture

== History ==
The parish is on the traditional lands of Weilwan Aboriginal peoples.

On 20 July 1900, an indigenous man, Jimmy Governor, murdered four members of the Mawbey family, and the children's governess, at their farming property in the area of Breelong. The story of the murders received great publicity at the time. and became the basis in 1972 of a fictional work by Thomas Keneally, The Chant of Jimmie Blacksmith.
