= The Chant of Jimmie Blacksmith (film) =

1978 film by Fred Schepisi

- US film poster
- Directed by: Fred Schepisi
- Screenplay by: Fred Schepisi
- Based on: The Chant of Jimmie Blacksmith by Thomas Keneally
- Produced by: Fred Schepisi
- Starring: Tommy Lewis; Freddy Reynolds; Ray Barrett; Jack Thompson; Angela Punch; Steve Dodd; Peter Carroll; Ruth Cracknell; Don Crosby; Elizabeth Alexander; Tim Robertson; Peter Sumner
- Cinematography: Ian Baker
- Edited by: Brian Kavanagh
- Music by: Bruce Smeaton
- Production companies: The Film House; The Australian Film Commission; The Victorian Film Corporation; Hoyts Theatres
- Distributed by: Hoyts Theatres
- Release date: 21 June 1978
- Running time: 122 minutes
- Country: Australia
- Language: English
- Budget: A$1.2 million
- Box office: A$1.021 million (Australia)

The Chant of Jimmie Blacksmith is a 1978 Australian drama film directed, written and produced by Fred Schepisi, and starring Tom E. Lewis (billed at the time as Tommy Lewis), Freddy Reynolds and Ray Barrett. The film also featured early appearances by Bryan Brown, Arthur Dignam, and John Jarratt. It is an adaptation of the 1972 novel The Chant of Jimmie Blacksmith by Thomas Keneally.

The story is about an exploited Aboriginal Australian who commits murder and goes into hiding. It is based on actual events surrounding Jimmy Governor.

The film was critically acclaimed, but lost A$179,000 at the box office. For Schepisi, the film's reception was a disillusioning experience and he left Australia soon after to work in Hollywood, returning to Australia ten years later to make Evil Angels.

While not prosecuted for obscenity, the film was seized and confiscated in the UK under Section 3 of the Obscene Publications Act 1959 during the video nasty panic.

== Plot ==
Jimmie Blacksmith, child of an Aboriginal mother and a white father, is raised to adulthood by the Reverend Neville and his wife Martha, hoping their influence will civilize him and provide him with greater opportunities in early twentieth century Australia. With a letter of recommendation from his foster family, he goes out in search of work to establish himself, but is taken advantage of by multiple parties. His first employer, Healey, repeatedly shortchanges his pay by nitpicking about his fencebuilding work, and refuses to write a job recommendation to avoid having to admit his illiteracy. Jimmie then works for a local constable, Farrell, who uses him as muscle against other Aboriginals, including having to capture a former friend who is later molested and murdered while in custody, and forced to cover up the death. Jimmie finds some stability working on the farm of the Newby family, although they treat him little better than other employers, and decides to summon and marry a white girlfriend, Gilda Marshall, who is already very pregnant when she arrives to move in with him. Gilda later gives birth to a white child, obviously not fathered by Jimmie; while upset at the public embarrassment, he eagerly embraces being a parent.

Shortly after the birth, Jimmie's full-caste half-brother Mort and uncle Tabidgi arrive, and Jimmie enlists their help in his fence-building work. However, Mr. Newby uses their presence as an excuse to deny Jimmie his pay and provisions, claiming the extra men were not part of their arrangement. Meanwhile, Mrs. Newby and a schoolteacher friend Miss Graf try to convince Gilda to take her baby and leave Jimmie for a teaching opportunity in another part of the country, which Gilda refuses. Furious at the mistreatment his family is facing, Jimmie enlists Tabidgi to help put a "scare" into the Newby women while the men are away, planning to threaten them with hatchets. The plan backfires and turns into a rampage that leaves Mrs. Newby, Miss Graf, and all the Newby daughters but one infant dead. Jimmie's family flee the compound, and shortly after Tabidgi, Gilda, and the child are left behind as Jimmie and Mort continue on the run. They soon murder Jimmie's previous employer Healey as well, with Jimmie announcing that he has declared war, in the manner he once heard the fighting against the Boers described. As press coverage about Jimmie's killings become nationwide news, a reporter makes regular probing inquiries to his butcher, who he is aware doubles as the city's hangman, about what may take place when Jimmie is captured. Tabidgi, captured and sentenced to death for accessory to murder, tells the court that the killings were not part of the plan and happened on an impulse.

Still uncaptured, Jimmie and Mort come upon a schoolteacher, McCready, whom they initially wound by gunfire; he convinces them not to kill him by showing them a newspaper article about their notoriety. They decide to take him as a hostage. As the brothers argue about the morality of their killing of women and children, McCready makes bitterly humorous observations about the influence of white people on the Aborigines. He convinces Jimmie to abandon Mort by indicating that Mort's soul has had none of Jimmie's detrimental white influences. Mort in turn takes McCready to a farm to recover, but is killed by a pursuing group led by the Newby males and Miss Graf's fiancee Dowie Steed. Jimmie himself is shot at in a lake, but manages to crudely tend to his wounds and hide out in a convent. He is found by police, who vainly try to prevent townspeople from beating him as they take him to jail. In the final scene, Jimmie is read the last rites by Rev. Neville in his cell, as the butcher/hangman observes them, and declares that despite the (perceived) unique physical characteristics of Jimmie, his hanging will likely go as normal as any other.

== Cast ==
The cast, a mix of professional actors (most of the white actors) and amateurs (most of the Aboriginal actors), was described by Pauline Kael as "a triumph of casting and coaching."

- Tom E. Lewis as Jimmie Blacksmith (credited as 'Tommy Lewis')
- Freddy Reynolds as Mort Blacksmith
- Ray Barrett as Farrell
- Jack Thompson as Rev. Neville
- Angela Punch McGregor as Gilda Marshall (credited as 'Angela Punch')
- Steve Dodd as Tabidgi
- Peter Carroll as McCready
- Ruth Cracknell as Mrs. Heather Newby
- Don Crosby as Jack Newby
- Elizabeth Alexander as Petra Graf
- Peter Sumner as Dowie Steed
- Tim Robertson as Healey
- Ray Meagher as Dud Edmonds
- Brian Anderson as Hyberry
- Jane Harders as Mrs. Healey
- Julie Dawson as Mrs Martha Neville
- Jack Charles as Harry Edwards
- Arthur Dignam as Knoller
- Robyn Nevin as Mrs McCready
- Liddy Clark as Kate
- Terry McDermott as M.P.
- Gregory Apps as Smith
- Ian Gilmour as Eddie

== Production ==
The film's budget was raised from a variety of sources; $350,000 plus a loan of $50,000 from the Australian Film Commission, $350,000 from the Victorian Film Corporation, $200,000 from Hoyts, $250,000 from Schepisi.

Tommy Lewis was spotted by Fred Schepisi's wife at Tullamarine just walking past. He was approached and was eventually cast.

Filming began on 8 August 1977 and went for fourteen weeks. It was shot in Panavision and is "one of the rare movies in which a wide screen is integral to the conception."

== Awards ==
The film won the Best Original Music Score (Bruce Smeaton), Best Actress in a Lead Role (Angela Punch McGregor) and Best Actor in a Supporting Role (Ray Barrett) and was nominated for 9 more awards at the Australian Film Institute (AFI) for 1978. It was also nominated for the Palme d'Or (Golden Palm) at the 1978 Cannes Film Festival.

== Box office ==
The Chant of Jimmie Blacksmith grossed $1,021,000 at the box office in Australia. Because of the promotional costs involved, only $50,000 was returned to the producers. Schepisi lost his entire investment.

== Home media ==
The Chant of Jimmie Blacksmith was released on DVD with a new print by Umbrella Entertainment in November 2008. The DVD is compatible with all region codes and includes special features such as the theatrical trailer and audio commentary with Fred Schepisi. The 30th Anniversary Edition also includes interviews with key cast and crew including Fred Schepisi and Tommy Lewis, a Q&A session with Fred Schepisi and Geoffrey Rush filmed at the Melbourne International Film Festival in 2008, a stills gallery and Making Us Blacksmiths, a documentary on the casting of Aboriginal lead actors Tommy Lewis and Freddy Reynolds. Many of the features of this disc were ported over for a U.S. DVD release from studio Industrial Entertainment, but is now out-of-print.

== Reception ==
The film holds a 100% approval rating on review aggregator website Rotten Tomatoes. Fred Schepisi said the Americans regarded the film as a Western and it led to him being offered the chance to direct one.

Roger Ebert gave the film 3.5 out of 4 stars and out praised the film's historical and ideological authenticity: "Its story is told entirely in the moral terms of the raw Australian outback of about 1900, and the racial attitudes in the movie are firmly drawn from that period... it is valuable because it deals with its materials in the terms of the period in which it is set. I found no message in the movie, and no contemporary political attitude reflected in the events of the past."

Pauline Kael for The New Yorker described the film as "large-scale and serenely shocking, with the principal characters shot against vast, rolling landscapes that are like wide, wide versions of the flat, layered backgrounds in Chinese ink wash paintings" and calls the film a "dreamlike Requiem Mass for a nation's lost honor."

The National Society of Film Critic's 100 Essential Films, an unranked list of the top 100 films required for "essential viewing", featured The Chant of Jimmie Blacksmith.

== See also ==
- Cinema of Australia
