= Wollar =

- Town
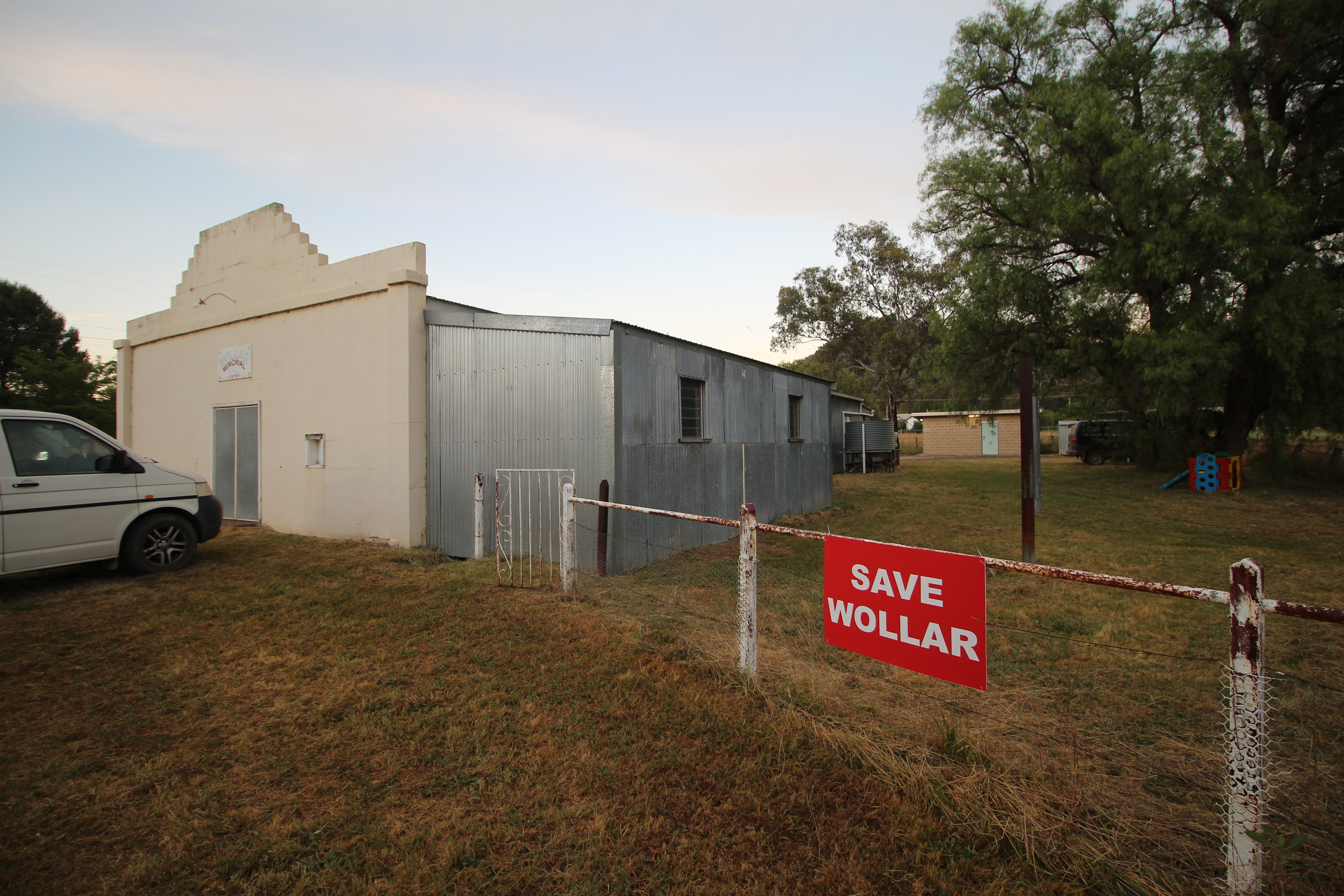
- The Wollar Memorial Hall, erected in 1955.

- Coordinates: 32°21′0″S 149°57′0″E
- Country: Australia
- State: New South Wales
- LGA: Mid-Western Regional Council
- Location: 316 km (196 mi) NW of Sydney; 48 km (30 mi) NE of Mudgee

Government
  - State electorate: Upper Hunter
  - Federal division: Parkes

Population
  - Total: 52 (2021 census)
- Postcode: 2850

Wollar is a village in New South Wales, Australia. The town is located 316 kilometres (196 mi) north west of the state capital Sydney and 48 kilometres (30 mi) north-east of the regional centre of Mudgee, near the Goulburn River National Park. At the 2006 census, Wollar and the surrounding region had a population of 304. By the 2016 census the village of Wollar and district was reduced to 69 persons living in 50 private dwellings.

== History ==
=== Aboriginal occupation ===
The area was originally occupied by the Wiradjuri people. The nearby Goulburn River (into which the Wollar Creek flows) was an important route for Aboriginal people between the inland region and the Hunter Valley. 'Wollar' is a Wiradjuri word meaning 'rock waterhole'.

=== 'Wandoona' pastoral run ===
In January 1830 Richard Fitzgerald commenced paying quit-rent (land tax) of £7 15s per annum on a grant of one thousand acres of land on Wollar Creek (in Phillip county). The grant of land had been promised to Fitzgerald by Sir Thomas Brisbane, Governor of New South Wales, in February 1824. A “Village Reserve” was surveyed north of Fitzgerald’s land grant. Richard Fitzgerald had arrived in the colony as a convict in 1791. Through his agricultural knowledge and steadfastness he was given increasing responsibilities in public farming. Under Macquarie he held the position of superintendent of agriculture at Emu Plains. By the early 1830s Fitzgerald was a wealthy private landholder, with land grants in the Gulgong and Cassilis districts (including his holding on Wollar Creek).

When Richard Fitzgerald died in 1840, his son Robert inherited the land on Wollar Creek. By this stage Robert Fitzgerald already had extensive pastoral holdings in the colony. He expanded the run at Wollar, named ‘Wandoona’, to encompass 5000 acres.

Wollar Creek in the vicinity of Fitzgerald’s property became a favoured camp-site for stockmen travelling to Mudgee and Gulgong.

=== The early township ===
In January 1868 George Willoughby, a storekeeper of Wollar Creek, was declared insolvent.

In March 1868 a government notification was published defining the portions of Crown Land beside Wollar Creek to be set apart as sites for the village of Wollar and adjoining suburban lands.

In February 1873 a site was dedicated for a Catholic church at Wollar on the western outskirts of the village at the corner of Phillip Street with Fitzgerald and Maitland streets. In 1875 a wooden church was erected on the site. At about the same time a wooden Anglican church was erected on Crown land on the opposite side of Wollar Creek to the township.

In November 1874 a publican’s license was granted to Margaret Willoughby for the Old Wollar Inn at Wollar. In April 1877 a notification was published for the upcoming sale by public auction, in the insolvent estate of George Willoughby, of four allotments in the village of Wollar on which was erected the "Wollar Inn", including a kitchen, stables and out-houses.

=== A panicked district ===
In July 1900 after two indigenous men, Jimmy Governor and Jack Underwood, murdered members of the Mawbrey family and a governess at Breelong near Gilgandra, Wollar suddenly became a focus of attention by police authorities and the colonial press. The reason for the attention was that Governor’s mother and younger siblings were living at the township. Underwood was captured soon afterwards, but Jimmy Governor and his younger brother Joe took to the bush and were still at large. A visitor to Wollar soon after the Breelong murders noted: “When we rode into the town we met men armed to the teeth, riding round looking out sharply for any sign of the blacks”. The police had brought all the local aborigines into the township in order to keep them under surveillance. At night they were locked up in a hall which had been “appropriated for their accommodation”. Such was the fear and panic in the Wollar district that “families from up and down the Wollar Creek have flocked into town, and every available place is crammed with humanity”.

With Jimmy and Joe Governor still at large the police were particularly wary of Jack Governor, the next oldest of five brothers. In the end five “able bodied” indigenous men, including Jack Governor, were locked up in the Wollar police station “for their own and the public safety”. In August 1900 the men, manacled and handcuffed, were bought into the Mudgee lockup. In September it was decided to send the Wollar Aborigines to the Mission Station near Brewarrina on the Barwon River. The women and children remaining at Wollar, including members of the Governor family, were conveyed to Mudgee in a “four horse conveyance”. One "old man" called Peter, "who was lawyer enough to know that the authorities could not shift him", opted to remain in Wollar. The men who had been detained in Mudgee gaol were released, and “that evening the whole party left by train for Brewarrina”. When they arrived at their destination they were taken to the Aborigines’ Mission Station on the river nine miles from Brewarrina.

=== Consolidation ===
In December 1903 a visitor to Wollar commented that Wollar “is not a city of much traffic, and even its streets, or rather where the streets ought to be, are heavily grassed, and grazed upon by sleek-coated cattle and horses”. The writer predicted that “from the very nature of its surroundings Wollar is destined to a career of stagnation, and will probably become smaller instead of bigger”.

In March 1905 a new Catholic church at Wollar was opened, replacing the old wooden church built in 1875. The St. Laurence O’Toole Catholic Church, in "restrained Gothic style of roughly-hewn stone", was designed by the architect Harold Hardwick of Mudgee. The walls were constructed of quarry-faced sandstone cut from nearby Willoughby’s Knob, the stone blocks loaded onto a dray and transported to the building site. The ceiling of the church was of Wunderlich tin-plate panels with an embossed pattern. The church is now de-consecrated and is owned by Peabody Energy, proprietors of the nearby Wilpinjong coal mine.

In 1914 the wooden Anglican church was replaced by a sandstone structure opened in September. The St. Luke’s Anglican church, with its distinctive crenellated parapets, was designed by Harold Hardwick (who had also designed the Wollar Catholic church). In 2009 the Anglican Church stripped St. Luke’s church of its fittings, pews and the stained-glass windows and put the building up for sale without consulting local parishioners. The church was purchased by Peabody Energy.

=== Shale oil ===
In May 1930 it was reported that the Australian Imperial Shale Oil Co. Ltd. had “taken up 400 acres of shale country, about three miles from Wollar”. The land that was acquired was described as having “millions of tons of shale, very rich in oil”, from which the company intended to extract petrol. A workshop, stores and a gantry was erected and a prospecting tunnel had been commenced.

In January 1935 the Australian Imperial Shale Oil company demonstrated to a group of visitors the process of retorting oil from shale using a system invented and erected by Ernest Schultz and his son. The machinery was installed at the site of the Wollar shale mine and the automated process featured "low temperature carbonisation" of the shale. The company claimed that “the cost of mining and retorting to the point of producing oil was approximately 3d per gallon”. No mining had been carried out at the Wollar mine “for some time” as the company was focussed on proving the “commercial possibilities of the retort”.

The prospects for a shale oil industry in Australia was the subject of government investigation in the mid-1930s and by 1937 the Federal Government had concluded that extracting oil from coal in Australia could only compete with the imported product if it were heavily subsidised. By June 1939 the Australian Imperial Shale Oil Company’s freehold land at Wollar, as well as buildings, machinery and equipment were advertised for sale by the receivers, Mackenzie Harris & Co. of Sydney.

== Wilpinjong coal mine ==
The majority of the Wollar townsite is surrounded by land approved for coal exploration by the State government. The United States mining company Peabody Energy operates the nearby Wilpinjong open-cut coal mine.

The Wilpinjong open-cut coal mine is located about six kilometres north-west of Wollar village. Thermal coal from the Wilpinjong coal mine provides fuel for the Liddell power station and also exports coal across the world through the Port of Newcastle.

The American parent company Peabody, self-described as “a leading coal producer, providing essential products to fuel baseload electricity”, has been an important contributor to organised climate change denial. The company had been “long known as an outlier even among fossil fuel companies for its public rejection of climate science and action”. When Peabody Energy filed for bankruptcy in April 2016 the company’s filings revealed extensive funding of a range of climate denial organisations and front groups, as well as scientists with contrarian opinions.

== Impacts of coal mining ==
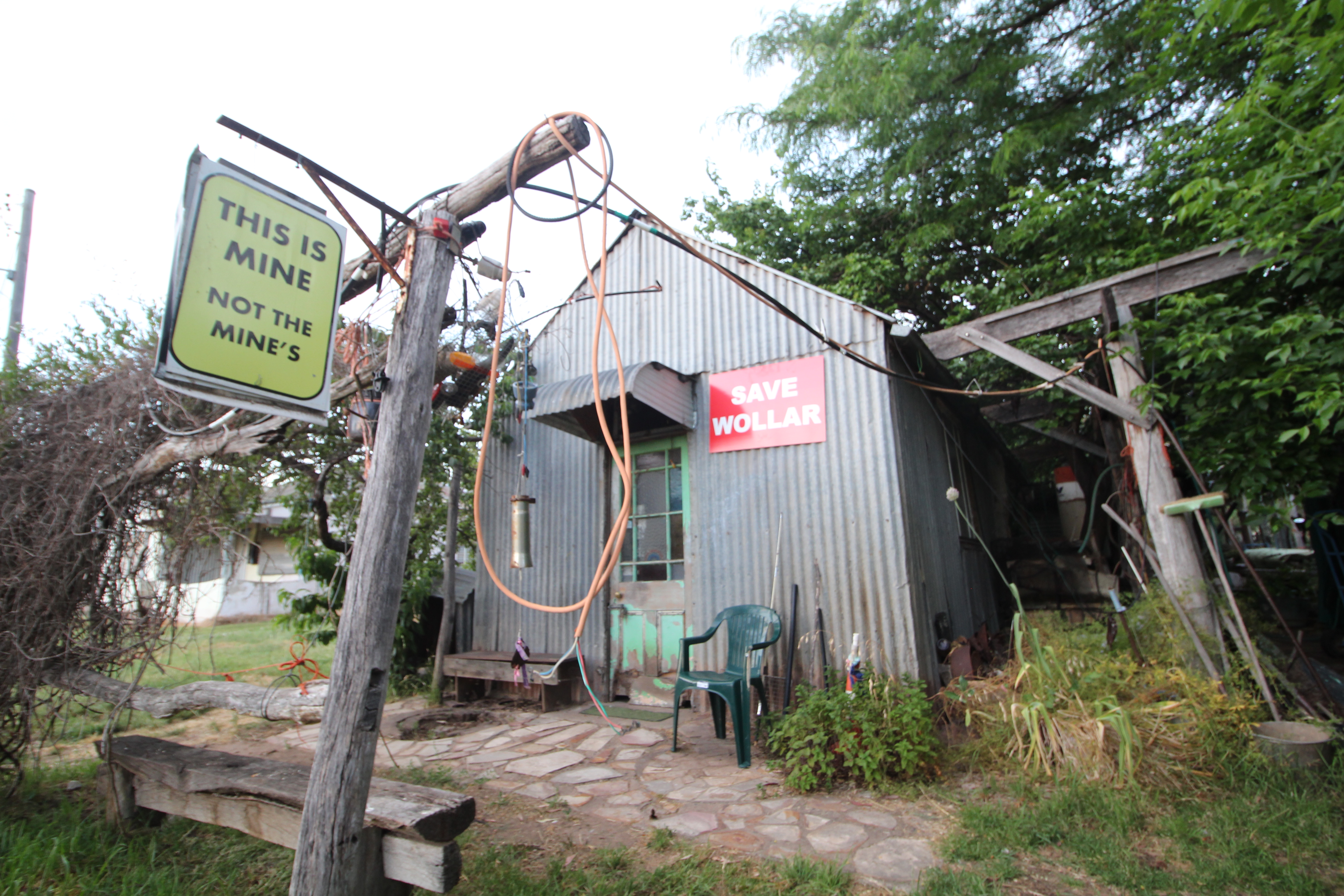
A privately-owned residence in Wollar, the last hold-out in an otherwise company-purchased village.

Peabody has purchased almost all the houses in Wollar. The planned purchasing of homes by Peabody has seen a decline in the population of Wollar.

Community members meet quarterly with Wilpinjong Mine leaders through the Community Consultative Committee (CCC). Community representatives requested an annual target of homes to be removed for safety and visual improvement reasons. Understandably not all residents agreed to sell their homes. The Wollar Public School was temporarily closed in 2019, the Rural Fire Service remains operational and the town's drop-in medical service is no longer offered due to low demand. Wilpinjong Mine looks after community facilities that includes public toilets and church buildings. Areas in the town, such as the Wollar Memorial Hall and the Wollar Recreation Ground which are maintained by the Wollar Progress Association, the school, the school residence, Wollar General Cemetery and Henry Harvey Memorial Park, are Crown land owned by the government.

In October 2013 Wilpinjong Coal was accused of repeatedly breaching its Environmental Pollution License by operating heavy machinery during adverse weather conditions. The Mudgee District Environmental Group cited photographic evidence provided by Wollar residents “showing high levels of dust pollution leaving the mine site and blowing through the village”. In November 2020 the NSW government published the ‘Wollar Initial Suitability Assessment’, which sought to justify a further release of land in the vicinity of Wollar for coal exploration. The potential release totalled approximately 80 square kilometres in an area encircling Wollar village. In April 2021 Deputy Premier Barilaro announced that the land surrounding Wollar village was released “for potential coal exploration”. Bev Smiles from the Wollar Progress Association accused the State government of failing to carry out an assessment of the social, environmental and economic impacts on the local community as required by the government’s own framework for issuing new coal mines.

Mining companies supported over 5,600 jobs and injected a $1.3 billion into the Central West region where Wollar is located in 2021/22 financial year. This spending included over $406 million on wages and $861 million on goods and services from 1,000 local suppliers.

In August 2024, Wilpinjong Mine was awarded the Environmental Excellence Award from the NSW Minerals Council for a biodiversity project at site.

== Renewable energy ==
The Wollar village is also situated near the Wollar Solar Farm and Central West-Orana REZ, a government-designated Renewable Energy Zone.

== Gallery ==
Wollar images

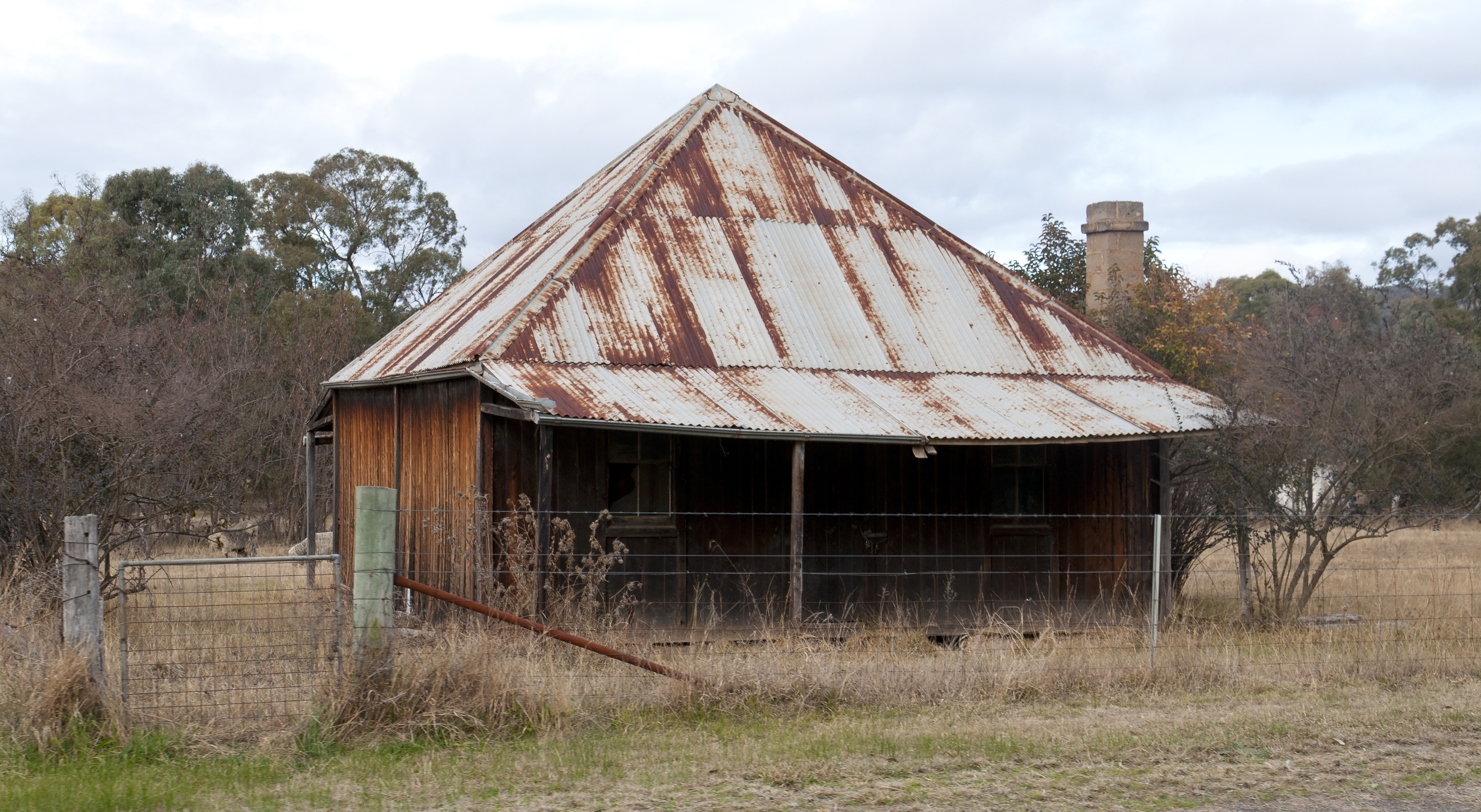
An old house at Wollar NSW.

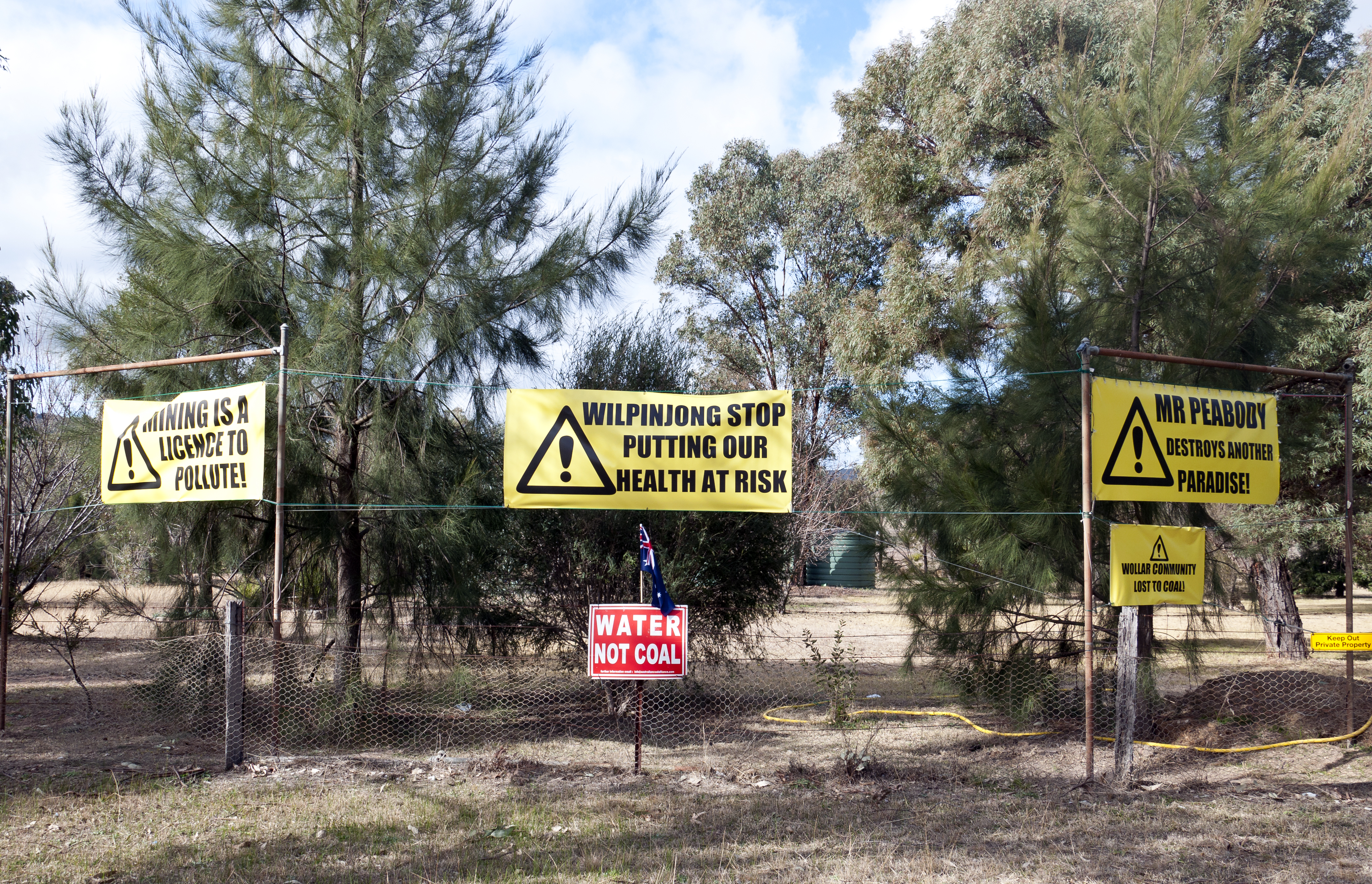
Protest signs at Wollar (photographed in 2011).

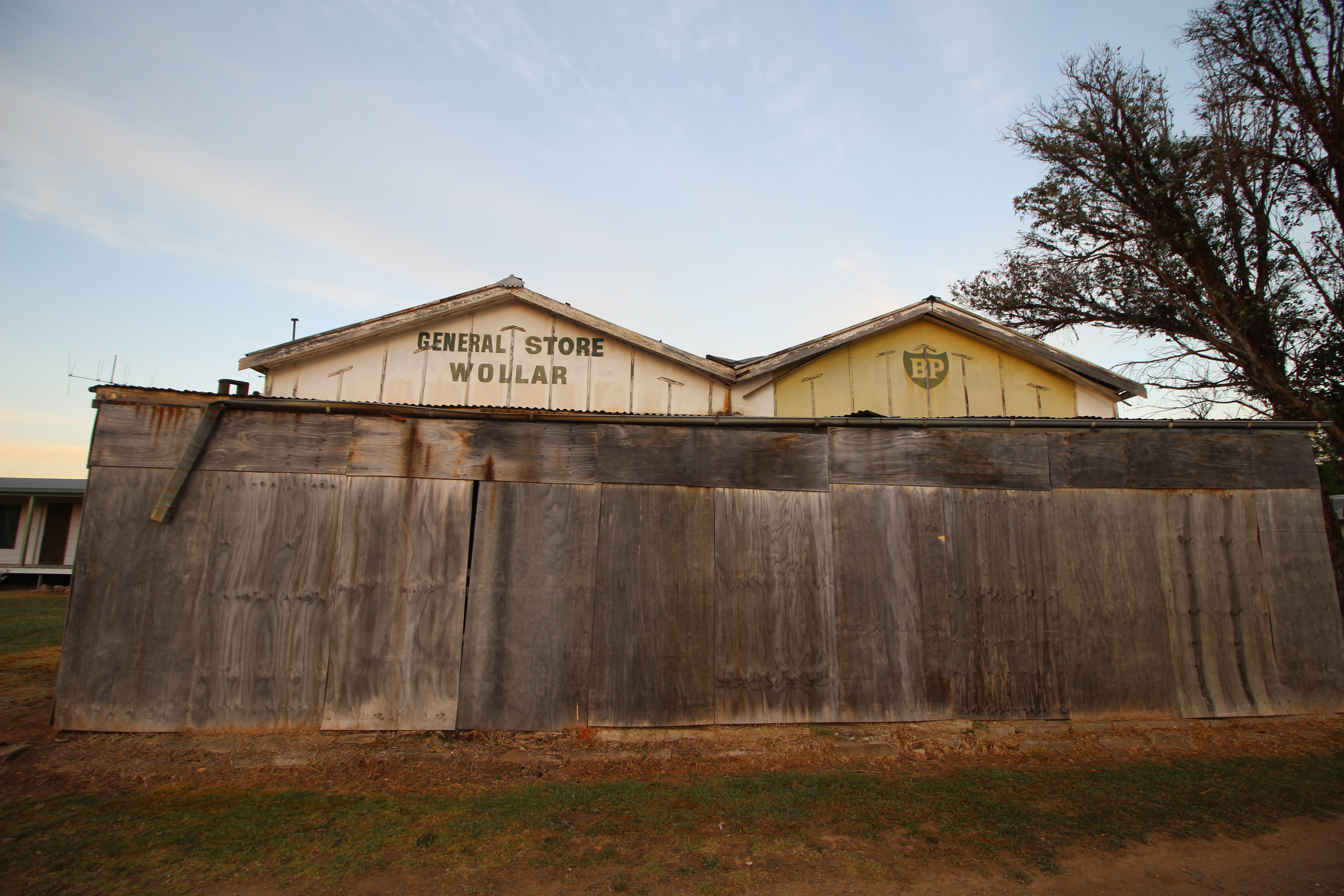
The Wollar General Store (closed and shuttered).

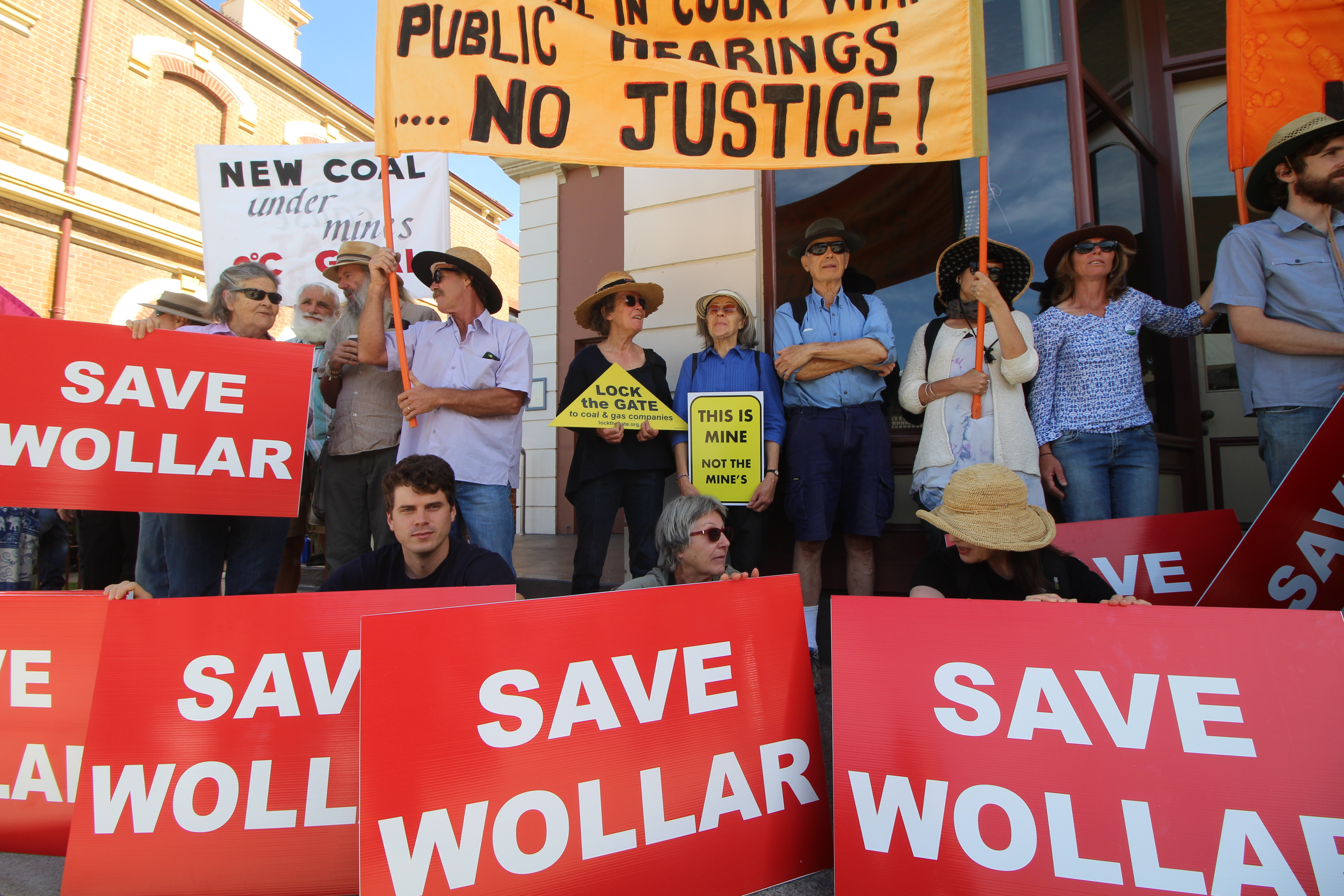
Wollar PAC Boycott 2016 Mudgee Town Hall.

== See also ==
- Mudgee-Wollar Important Bird Area
- Acland, Queensland
