= The Chant of Jimmie Blacksmith =

Novel by Thomas Keneally

The Chant of Jimmy Blacksmith
- First edition
- Author: Thomas Keneally
- Language: English
- Genre: Fiction
- Publisher: Angus and Robertson, Australia
- Publication date: 1972
- Publication place: Australia
- Media type: Print
- Pages: 178 pp
- ISBN: 0207123756

The Chant of Jimmie Blacksmith is a 1972 Booker Prize-nominated Australian novel by Thomas Keneally, and a 1978 Australian film of the same name directed by Fred Schepisi. The novel is based on the life of bushranger Jimmy Governor, the subject of an earlier book by Frank Clune.

== Story outline ==
The Chant of Jimmie Blacksmith is set in 19th century New South Wales and tells the ultimately tragic story of Jimmie, an Aboriginal man caught between his family and culture and white settler colonialism.

The story is written from the perspective of Jimmie Blacksmith, an Indigenous Australian man on a mission of revenge. The story is a fictionalised retelling of the life of the infamous Indigenous bushranger Jimmy Governor.

Keneally has said that were he to write the novel today he would not write 'from within a black consciousness'.

== See also ==
- 'The Chant of Jimmie Blacksmith' by Australian Roots-Rock band The Groovesmiths is also based on the story.
- 1972 in Australian literature

== Notes ==
- Dedication: To the Memory of Peter Cady [died] January, 1971.

== Awards ==
The novel was nominated for the Booker Prize in 1972, losing to John Berger's G..

The film won the Best Original Music Score (Bruce Smeaton), Best Actress in a Lead Role (Angela Punch McGregor) and Best Actor in a Supporting Role (Ray Barrett) and was nominated for 9 more awards at the Australian Film Institute (AFI) for 1978. It was also nominated for the Palme d'Or (Golden Palm) at the 1978 Cannes Film Festival.
