= Mary Schepisi =

American artist (born 1949)

- Schepisi in 2011
- Born: March 6, 1949 (age 77); New York, NY
- Education: Art Students League of New York, Boston University
- Known for: painting, drawing, needlework

Mary Rubin Schepisi (born March 6, 1949) is an American artist currently working in Melbourne, Australia, and New York City. She is married to the film director Fred Schepisi.

== Background ==
Schepisi was born Mary Rubin into a Jewish family in New York City. Her father, the son of Polish immigrants, operated a company supplying industrial uniforms. Her mother migrated to the United States from England. Always supportive of Schepisi's interest in the arts, her parents enrolled her in the Art Students League of New York at the age of 10, where she came to study with many leading figures in the formative art movements of the 1960s, including the painters Jean Liberte and Milton Glasier. She attended Birch Wathen School on the Upper East Side and Boston University's College of Fine Arts. Schepisi spent her early career in the fashion and modeling industries. She has one sister, Leslie Slatkin, a nephew, William Slatkin, one son, Nicholas Schepisi, who currently works in film in New York, and six step-children.

== Work ==
Schepisi's figurative-based works involve drawing, painting, collage, needlework and a range of mixed media applications. When signing her smaller works Schepisi on occasion uses the lower-case monogram "mrs". Her art practice is notable for the high level of engagement she pursues with her subject matter. From the political to the personal, covering topics from perestroika to domestic violence, Schepisi often develops a close working partnership with her subjects as each body of work takes shape.

Schepisi's early work comprised small-scale pieces undertaken in her travels to film locations with her director-husband Fred Schepisi. One notable exhibition from these years was Glasnost/Perestroika (1990) shown in different configurations in London, Los Angeles and Melbourne, which was executed in 1989 during the shooting of The Russia House in Moscow, the first American production granted permission to film in the Soviet Union. With access to many leading figures in Russian film circles, including Raisa Fomina, Masha Chugunova (assistant to Andrei Tarkovsky), the producer Leonid Vereschagin and the famed director Elem Klimov, the artist employed painting and collage—clipping reports in the morning newspaper and gathering ephemera from her daily travels in Moscow—to chronicle the rapidly changing cultural landscape under Mikhail Gorbachev's policy of perestroika.

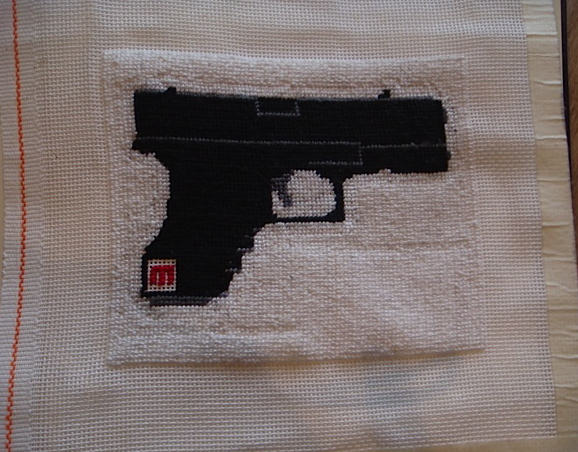
Mary Schepisi, Needlepoint 2010

Schepisi's most recent body of work, Beauty Interrupted (2011) involves photographs of models in New York, Paris and Milan fashion shows similarly over-painted with contemporary and topical imagery including burkhas and burkinis (Islam-approved swimwear).

Her more personal work is both intimate and confronting, delving into issues of domestic violence, mental illness and sexual assault, in some cases combining text with portraiture. In Speculations (2004), Schepisi asked a large number of women to write often highly personal biographical essays before painting their portraits. The essays and paintings were then hung unmatched, leaving it to the viewer to connect each woman's life story to her portrait.

In recent years Schepisi has turned to needlework to address both the personal and political from her strongly feminist perspective. The subject matter for these pieces varies widely, from images of handguns and household cleaning products to indigenous Australian iconography and text-based invectives. A current work-in-progress entails a body of needlepoint revealing an exchange of imagined love letters sent between her Polish grandmother and the fictive Leipzig artist Johann Dieter Wassmann (1841–1898). Of this use of text Schepisi writes:

Then there are the words, like sorry, which had a huge influence on me and a word which really should not have a full stop after it. Sorry is never the end, it is the beginning.

Schepisi has been an active supporter of arts philanthropy, in 2009 organizing an art auction that raised $84,000 for the Juvenile Diabetes Research Foundation. She and her husband own a winery on Victoria's Mornington Peninsula, where they live part of the year.

== Exhibitions ==
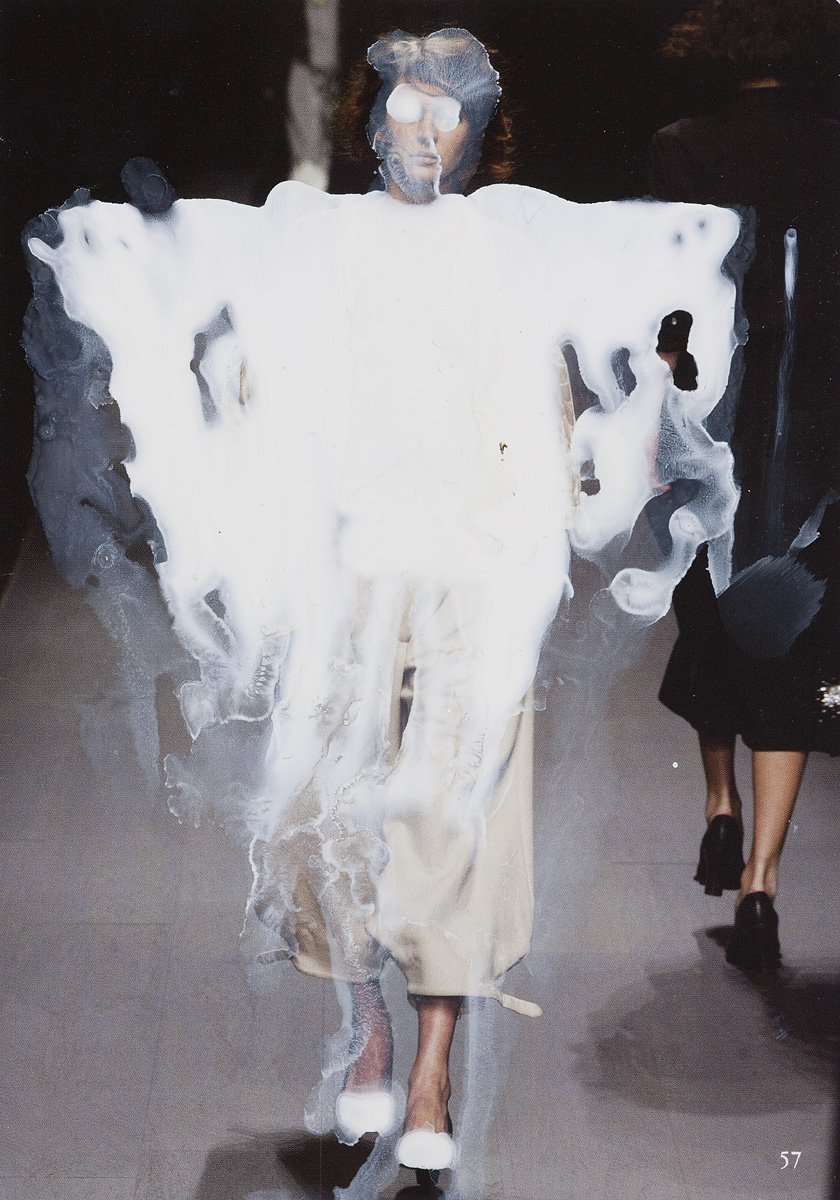
Mary Schepisi, Beauty Interrupted 2011

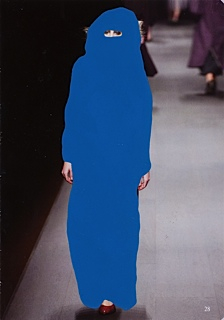
Mary Schepisi, Blue Burka 2011

=== Solo exhibitions ===
- 2018: Out of the Heat, In from the Cold, Artvisory Gallery, Melbourne
- 2011: Beauty Interrupted, L'Oreal Melbourne Fashion Festival
- 2011: It's Up To You, Mossgreen Gallery, Melbourne
- 2009: Guns, Birds & Words, Bowman/Bloom, New York
- 2009: Guns, Birds & Words, Chapman & Bailey, Melbourne
- 2007: Inferences ... a summer diary, Bowman/Bloom, New York
- 2004: The Collection, Span Galleries, Melbourne
- 2004: Speculations, Span Galleries, Melbourne
- 2002: Bodies of Evidence, Span Galleries, Melbourne
- 2002: Mary's Little Gems, 69 Smith Street, Melbourne
- 2000: Postcard Show, Royal College of Art, London
- 1998: Toys for Joy, Royal Children's Hospital, Melbourne
- 1997: George Gallery, Melbourne
- 1994: The Sofa Series, William Mora Gallery, Melbourne
- 1990: Glasnost/Perestroika, Jo Wilder Gallery, Los Angeles
- 1990: Glasnost/Perestroika, William Mora Gallery, Melbourne
- 1990: Glasnost/Perestroika, San Lorenzo, London
- 1988: Evil Angels, Peter Grant Fine Art, Melbourne

=== Group exhibitions ===
- 2010: Conflict/Interest, Second Street Gallery, Charlottesville, Virginia
- 2008: The Beast In Me, Bowman/Bloom, New York
- 2001: Art by Gum, School of Botany Foundation, University of Melbourne
- 2000: Secret, Royal College of Art Exhibition, London
- 1999: George Galley, Melbourne
- 1998: Exchanging Places, George Gallery in Residence, Ray Hughes Gallery, Sydney
- 1995: Sofa Series, at the River, Southgate, Melbourne
- 1991: Mr. Baseball, Diane Farris Gallery, Vancouver
