= Fred Schepisi =

Australian director, producer, and screenwriter (born 1939)

Fred Schepisi AO
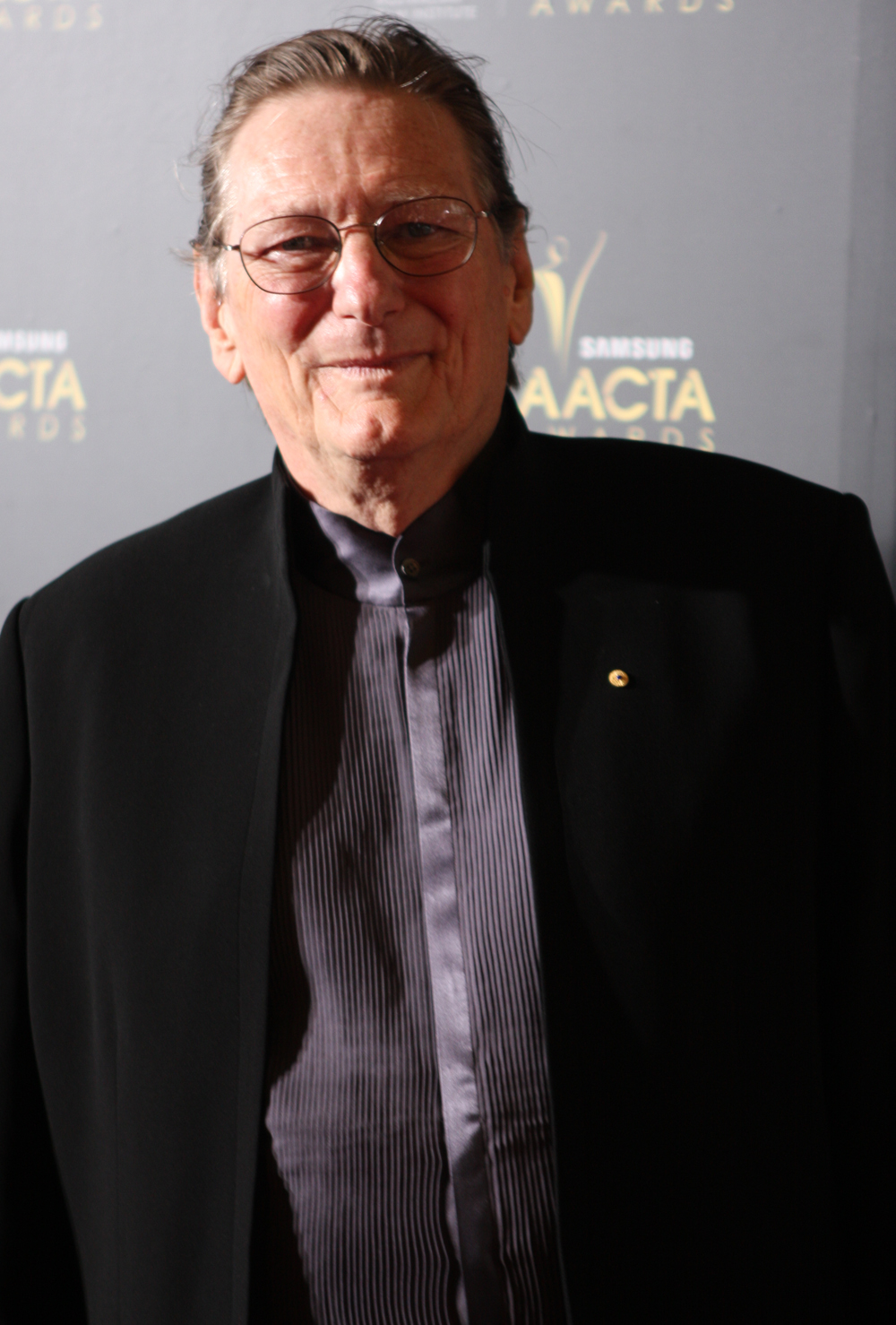
- Schepisi in 2012
- Born: Frederic Alan Schepisi; 26 December 1939 (age 86); Melbourne, Victoria, Australia
- Occupations: Film director; producer; screenwriter
- Years active: 1976–present
- Known for: The Chant of Jimmie Blacksmith; Plenty; Last Orders; Empire Falls; The Eye of the Storm
- Spouse: Mary Schepisi
- Children: Alexandra Schepisi

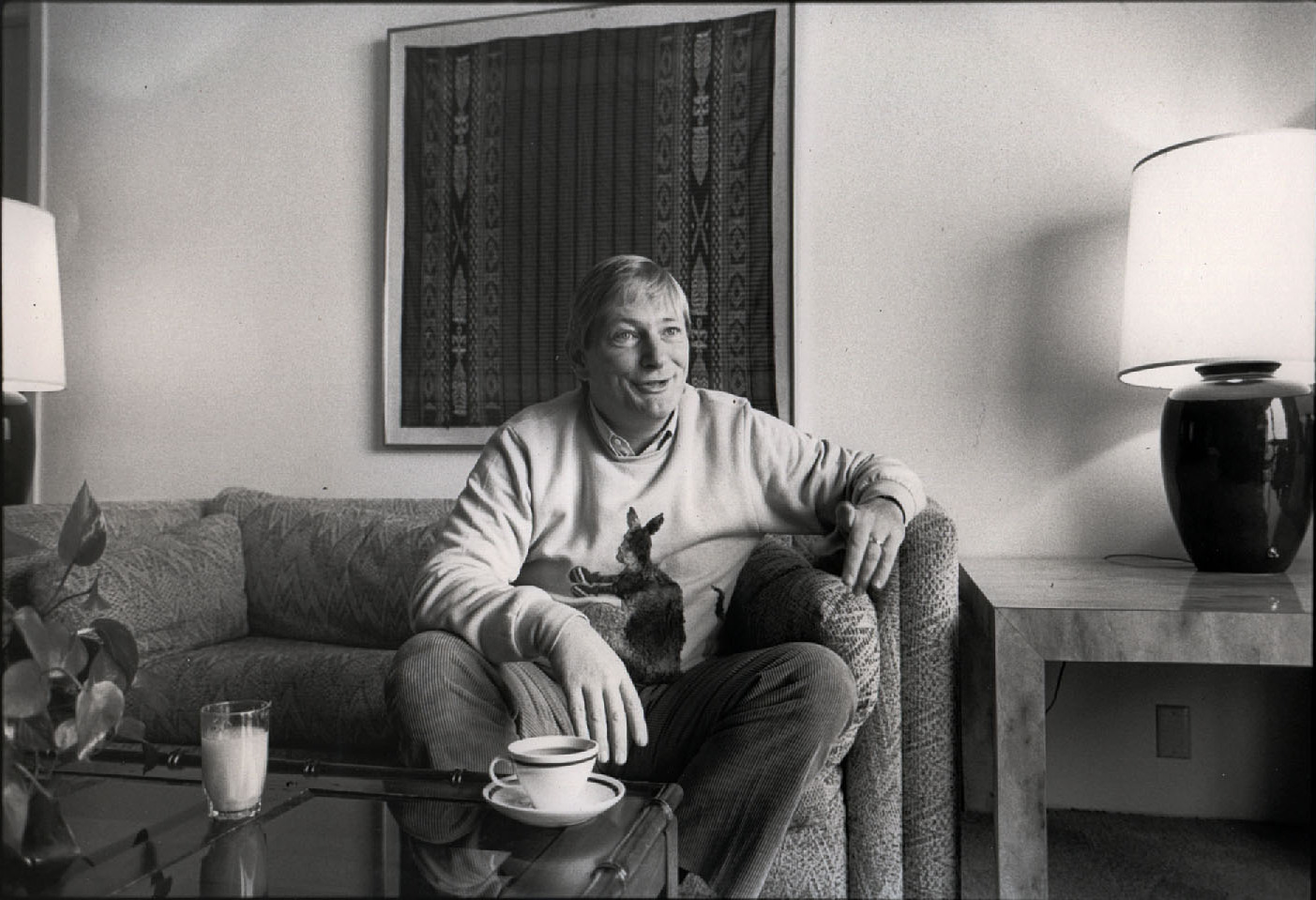
Schepisi in 1984

Frederic Alan Schepisi AO (/ˈskɛpsi/ SKEP-see; born 26 December 1939) is an Australian film director, producer, and screenwriter. His credits include The Chant of Jimmie Blacksmith, Plenty, Roxanne, A Cry in the Dark, Mr. Baseball, Six Degrees of Separation, and Last Orders.

== Early life and education ==
Frederic Alan Schepisi was born in the Melbourne suburb of Richmond on 26 December 1939, the son of Loretto Ellen (née Hare) and Frederic Thomas Schepisi, who was a fruit dealer and car salesman of Italian descent.

During his late teens, he began watching classic post-war European films such as The Wages of Fear, Rocco and His Brothers, and Bicycle Thieves at The Savoy, a theatre in Russell Street which specialised in showing such films.

As part of his high school education, he spent 18 months at the Marist Brothers juniorate in Macedon in regional Victoria. His experiences there were later depicted in his 1976 feature film The Devil's Playground.

After completing his school-leaving certificate at 14, for a short time he worked in one of his father's car yards as a motor mechanic but had no aptitude for the job, and was glad to discover the world of advertising.

== Career ==
Schepisi started work as a messenger at Carden Advertising (later Clemenger), where a number of journalists were also employed, including Phillip Adams. He joined local film clubs and experimented with filmmaking. He worked his way up in the advertising industry, becoming a copywriter, and eventually started directing commercials. He was appointed as Victorian manager for Cinesound Productions in 1964, at the age of 24, after lying about his age. There he met cinematographer Russell Boyd. At the time, Cinesound was only making newsreels and corporate films, but Schepisi changed its direction. He used the best film students from the newly established Swinburne film courses to work on the films, and produced avant-garde commercials for clients such as Volkswagen and Alcoa, which brought profits to the company. He was less interested in creating newsreels.

=== The Film House ===
In 1966, along with graphic designers Bruce Weatherhead and Alex Stitt, Schepisi bought out Cinesound Victoria in 1966, renaming it The Film House. The Film House founded became an important player in the "new wave" of Australian filmmaking, along with Gillian Armstrong, Bruce Beresford, and Peter Weir. Since Cinesound had stopped making films during World War II, there hadn't been many Australian films made. Schepisi invited editor Jill Bilcock to work for him soon after her graduation from Swinburne Film and Television School.

=== Films ===
His first fiction film was a 30-minute short film, part of the anthology feature film Libido in 1973. In collaboration with Australian author Thomas Keneally, he made the short film The Priest.

Schepisi's first feature film was The Devil's Playground, in 1976, but it was The Chant of Jimmie Blacksmith (1978), based on Keneally's novel of the same name, that brought him to international notice. This film was one of the first to feature an Aboriginal story on the big screen. This led to his first film produced in the US, Barbarosa (1982), a Western starring Willie Nelson.

The sci-fi parable Iceman (1984) came next, and in 1985 he adapted David Hare's stage drama, Plenty, for the film of the same name (1985), starring Meryl Streep. In 1987 Steve Martin starred in his next film, the comedy Roxanne (1987), based on the 1897 French play by Edmond Rostand, Cyrano de Bergerac. Streep, along with Sam Neill, starred again in his 1988 film Evil Angels, which was filmed in Australia (released as A Cry in the Dark outside of Australia and New Zealand).

The Russia House (1990), based on the spy thriller by John le Carré, starred Sean Connery and Michelle Pfeiffer. Six Degrees of Separation (1993) was another adaptation, this time of the 1990 play by John Guare, and in 1994 he made I.Q., based on a story about Albert Einstein and his niece. His next major film on the big screen was in 2001, Last Orders, starring Ray Winstone, Michael Caine, and Bob Hoskins.

In 2003, he made It Runs in the Family, with Kirk and Michael Douglas in the lead roles. In 2005, Schepisi directed and co-produced the HBO miniseries Empire Falls, starring Paul Newman, Ed Harris, Philip Seymour Hoffman, Joanne Woodward, Robin Wright Penn, and Helen Hunt.

In April 2008, it was announced that Film Finance Corporation Australia was providing funding for Schepisi's film The Last Man, about the final days of the Vietnam War. It was scheduled to begin filming in Queensland, with Guy Pearce and David Wenham in leading roles, towards the end of the year.

In 2011, Schepisi directed The Eye of the Storm. Filmed in Melbourne, Sydney, and Far North Queensland, and based on the novel by Patrick White, The Eye of the Storm stars Charlotte Rampling, Judy Davis, and Geoffrey Rush. The story is about "children finally understanding themselves through the context of family".

In 2013, he directed Words and Pictures, starring Juliette Binoche and Clive Owen.

=== Music videos ===
Schepisi has also directed a number of music videos, including for the 2008 song "Breathe" by Kaz James featuring Stu Stone.

== Other activities ==
In the mid-1960s, he campaigned strongly, along with MP Barry Jones, broadcaster and writer Phillip Adams, for the establishment of a film school in Melbourne. This led to the first course in filmmaking at Swinburne Technical College in 1966, leading to the establishment of the Swinburne Film and Television School a few years later. Schepisi became an examiner of its first film course, an unpaid role.

Schepisi was president of the 2006 Bangkok International Film Festival in Thailand.

In 2007, he chaired the jury at the 29th Moscow International Film Festival.

As of 2024, Schepisi is a patron of the National Film and Sound Archive.

== Recognition and awards ==
Schepisi has won a number of Australian Film Institute (AFI) and Australian Writers' Guild Awards for his work.

VicScreen presents an annual award called the Fred Schepisi Award, for achievement in direction.

A photographic portrait of him by Kate Gollings, taken in 2000, is held by the National Portrait Gallery in Canberra.

Other honours and awards include:

- 1973: Co-winner, with Thomas Keneally of a Silver AFI Award, for The Priest
- 1976: Winner, AFI Award for Best Film, for The Devil's Playground
- 1991: Nominated for Golden Bear at the 41st Berlin International Film Festival, The Russia House
- 1991: Winner, AFI's Raymond Longford Award
- 1994: Chauvel Award at the Brisbane International Film Festival
- 2003: Australian Screen Directors Association's Outstanding Achievement Award
- 2004: Officer of the Order of Australia in the Australia Day Honours, "For services to the Australian film industry as a director, producer and screenwriter, the development of creative talent as a mentor and to support for the preservation of Australia's film heritage" (Note: Per personal contact with the Honours Secretariat, Schepisi ticked a box on his form that said he did not want his name to appear electronically, so he does not appear in a search on the official honours list. See the discussion on his Wikipedia talk page.)
- 2005: Nominated, Emmy Award for Outstanding Directing for a Miniseries, Movie or Dramatic Special and the Directors Guild of America Award for Best Director of a TV Film, for Empire Falls
- 2006: Honorary Degree of Doctor of Visual and Performing Arts, University of Melbourne; – the first honorary doctorate to be awarded by the Victorian College of the Arts
- 2006: Golden Globe Award for Best Miniseries or TV Movie, for Empire Falls
- 2011: Special Jury Prize at Rome International Film Festival, for Eye of the Storm

== Personal life ==
Schepisi has been married three times and has seven children. He had four children with his first wife Joan.

He met his second wife Rhonda Finlayson (11 September 1940 – 30 October 1995), sister of actor Jon Finlayson, when she became a driver for his company, Film House. She had previously had an acting and singing career in the 1950s. She later become production manager and casting director. She cast his first film in 1973 (Libido), and they married in that year. She continued to do casting for his films, including casting Tom E. Lewis in his first film role in The Chant of Jimmy Blacksmith after spotting him at Melbourne Airport. They had two daughters together, but their marriage ended in 1983. Rhonda remarried and did casting in the UK and US. She went on to establish her own production company, Rhonda Schepisi Productions, in Melbourne. While working on the production of a screen adaptation of Tim Winton's short story "A Blow, a Kiss", she died of cancer on 30 October 1995. Filming had finished three days earlier, and production was completed by the film's director, Rey Carlson.

His third wife, Mary, whom he married in 1984 and with whom he had a seventh child, is American.

In 2011, asked about the "gypsy-like existence" of a filmmaker, Schepisi said: "It's the hardest thing. I think we're today's circus people. It's very hard on your family. [His wife] Mary travels with me and when everyone was younger and it was possible, I liked them to travel with me and be with me. Fortunately, Mary's an artist; she paints, and often finds inspiration from our locations."

He supports Australia becoming a republic and is a founding member of the Australian Republican Movement.

== Filmography ==
- The Devil's Playground (1976)
- The Chant of Jimmie Blacksmith (1978)
- Barbarosa (1982)
- Iceman (1984)
- Plenty (1985)
- Roxanne (1987)
- Evil Angels (A Cry in the Dark) (1988)
- The Russia House (1990)
- Mr. Baseball (1992)
- Six Degrees of Separation (1993)
- I.Q. (1994)
- Fierce Creatures (1997)
- Last Orders (2001)
- It Runs in the Family (2003)
- Empire Falls (2005)
- The Eye of the Storm (2011)
- Words and Pictures (2013)

=== Unmade films ===
- Bitter Sweet (1979) – romance drama for Avco Embassy
