= 'Nosey Bob' Howard =

Australian colonial executioner (c. 1832–1906)

Robert ('Nosey Bob') Howard
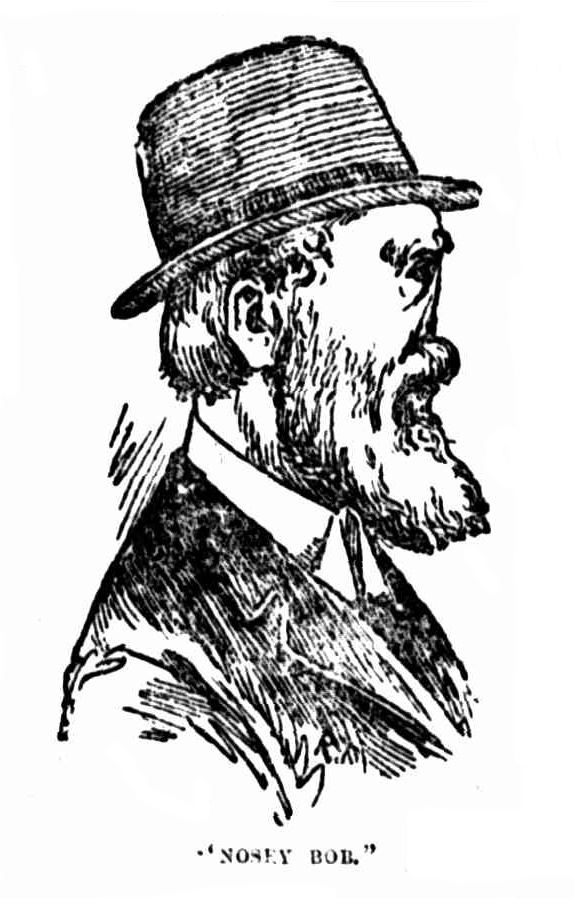
- 'Nosey Bob' Howard, New South Wales hangman.
- Born: Robert Rice Howard c. March 1832; Marham, Norfolk, England
- Died: 3 February 1906; North Bondi, New South Wales, Australia
- Occupation: Hangman
- Years active: 1873 – 1903
- Spouse: Jane Townsend (m. 1858)
- Parents: Henry Howard; Mary Ann Rice

Robert Rice Howard (known as "Nosey Bob" Howard) (c. March 1832 – 3 February 1906) was an Australian executioner. He was employed as a hangman for the colony of New South Wales from 1875, initially as an assistant hangman. Howard held the position of senior executioner from 1877 until he retired in 1904. Throughout a career spanning twenty-eight years, Robert Howard assisted or supervised the execution of sixty-two persons in New South Wales. Howard had a facial disfigurement, resulting in the loss of his nose, that occurred while working as a cabman in the mid-1870s. His missing nose and lengthy high-profile career as an executioner led to him being generally known, in newspapers and common parlance, as 'Nosey Bob'.

== Biography ==
=== Early life ===
Robert Rice Howard was born in about March 1832 in the village of Marham in Norfolk, England, to Henry Howard and Mary Ann (née Rice). His father worked as a coachman and Robert followed in his father's profession.

Howard later claimed to be related, "in a very distant way", to the Duke of Norfolk, and had "running in his veins 'all the blood of all the Howards'".

=== Emigration to Australia ===
Robert Howard and Jane Townsend were married in 1858 in Lewisham in south-east London. The couple's first three children were born in England. In the 1861 census Robert and Jane Howard and their first born, a daughter named Mary Ann, were living at Bermondsey and Robert's occupation was recorded as "Coachman - Domestic Servant". In 1862 the family was living at Tetbury, in county Gloucestershire.

In the mid-1860s Robert and Jane Howard and their three young children, Mary Ann (aged 5), Emily (aged 3) and an infant named Edward, emigrated to Australia. They departed from England in November 1865 aboard the Legion of Honour and arrived at Brisbane in the colony of Queensland in February 1866. Robert Howard was recorded as a butcher on the immigration records.

The couple's fourth child was born in Brisbane in 1867, after which the family relocated to the colony of New South Wales. In 1868, Howard was recorded as a cabman in Sydney. The couple's fifth child (a boy named Sidney) was born in 1869 at Parramatta. A sixth child, William, was born in Sydney in 1872.

=== A Sydney cabman ===
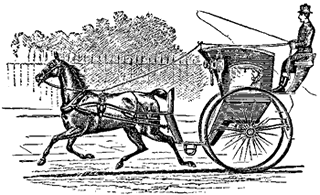
The hansom cab.

By the late 1860s, Howard was working as a cabman in Sydney, driving a horse-drawn vehicle for hire. He was a success at his job, becoming a cab proprietor as well as a driver. One reference states that he was the proprietor of a hansom cab, from which he "earned a respectable living" and had a reputation for being "clean, capable and punctual". Howard was considered to be polite and well-presented to his customers despite the "long hours and physical demands of keeping a cab and horse". Howard built up a profitable clientele amongst the wealthy residents of suburbs such as Darling Point and was often called upon as cabman for Government jobs.

In 1873 an incident occurred, involving a coach possibly being driven by Robert Howard, which was conveying the Governor of New South Wales and his family. On the evening of 14 July Sir Hercules Robinson was riding, with his wife and children, in a carriage drawn by two horses on their way to attend the theatre. As the carriage descended a hill in Elizabeth Street, the pole-chain gave way and startled the horses, causing them to bolt. One of the wheels hit a rut and the driver of the vehicle, named Howard, was thrown from his seat. The coach was eventually brought to a standstill without further incident. A newspaper report of the accident attributed "no blame" to Howard, who received injuries to his knees from the fall and "had to be conveyed home in a cab".

During the period that Howard worked as a cabman in Sydney, he had an accident involving a kick to his face by a horse, that left him disfigured without a nose. A typical account of the cause of his deformity states: "The facial disfigurement was the result of an accident – a kick from a vicious horse, which literally smashed the nose beyond the possibility of repair". One account states that Howard "lost his nose by a horse kick in a Bligh-street livery-stable". The accident had a profound effect on Howard's life, as thereafter his "business as a cab-owner fell off". It was said that ladies from upper-class Sydney suburbs "shrank from employing him" because of his facial deformity, and he began to suffer cruel jibes from fellow cabmen, leading to his determination to "change his mode of obtaining a livelihood". The historian Rachel Franks has proposed that the loss of Howard's nose may have come about from a condition known as saddle-nose caused by syphilis.

In May 1874 Howard was fined twenty shillings, plus costs, for "furious driving", in addition to a further penalty of ten shillings with costs on a charge of using obscene language. Three months later he was again charged with using obscene language and fined ten shillings. In May 1875 Howard was fined forty shillings in the Central Police Court in Sydney for "having by furious driving endangered public safety". Howard's court appearances during this period were possibly a result of him being under extreme financial pressure. By mid-year 1876 Howard had changed careers and taken up the role of assistant hangman.

=== Assistant hangman ===
The roles of hangman and assistant hangman were positions within the Sheriff's office of the New South Wales Department of Justice. In the mid-1870s the senior hangman in New South Wales was a man named John Franks, who had been a deserter from the United States Navy. He was also a violent drunkard. In April 1876 Franks was discovered in Hyde Park in a moribund condition; he was taken to the Sydney Infirmary where he died, aged 26 years, from "intermittent fever and debility" brought about by "habits of drunkenness and dissipation". After the death of Franks the assistant hangman, William Tucker, was promoted to senior executioner. With the position of assistant hangman vacant, Robert Howard was employed in that role in June 1876.

==== The hanging of George Pitt ====
Howard's first role as Tucker's assistant was in the execution of George Pitt, who was hanged within the precincts of Mudgee Gaol on 21 June 1876. Pitt had been convicted of the murder of the widow, Mary Ann Martin, who kept a public-house named the Travellers' Rest Hotel on the road between Gulgong and Mudgee (about five miles from Gulgong, near 'Guntawang' station). George Pitt was a young farm labourer who murdered Mrs. Martin on Christmas night in 1875, in the passage outside her bedroom, by cutting her throat with a knife. Pitt was tried in the Mudgee Circuit Court in April 1876 and sentenced to death.

The gallows erected within Mudgee Gaol were located at the north-west corner of the men's yard. The structure was about sixteen feet high (extending two feet above the gaol wall), with a pit dug underneath, five feet deep. A weight was attached to the trapdoor so that, when the bolt was drawn, "the door would be kept from swinging about". The trapdoor was padded with bags in order to cause as little noise as possible when it opened. The top of the gallows was enclosed with canvas, to conceal the execution from the general public outside of the gaol walls. On the morning of the execution Pitt was brought from his cell, accompanied by the Deputy Sheriff and the attending Anglican minister, and followed by the hangman, William Tucker, and his assistant, Robert Howard. The correspondent for the Australian Town and Country Journal commented that the assistant hangman was "a new hand", who "was recognised as having once been in good circumstances in Sydney". After the Deputy Sheriff gave the order to proceed, the principal hangman adjusted the rope, during which Pitt called out: "Tell me if I am standing straight". The prisoner then refused to give Howard his handkerchief, even though he had previously requested that it be handed to his mother. When the order was given, Turner drew the bolt, "launching the unhappy man into eternity". The body was cut down after twenty minutes and a formal inquest held.

==== Michael Connolly ====
After Pitt's execution, Tucker and Howard left Mudgee to travel to Tamworth, where they were to perform another hanging. The condemned man in Tamworth Gaol was Michael Connelly, who had been convicted for the "wilful murder" of his wife, Mary Connelly, at Carroll Gap (east of Gunnedah) on or about 24 December 1875. Michael Connelly and his wife lived on a selection of land at Carroll Gap (also referred to as Connolly's Gap). Connolly was described as "a plodding old man, morose, reticent and stupid", considered by his neighbours to be "somewhat demented". In late 1875 he was a patient in the Tamworth Hospital, suffering from a severe injury to his right eye. He was discharged on 23 December 1875 and returned to the house on his selection. His wife, who was residing with a neighbour, took him some food that evening and her body was discovered the following morning. Connolly was arrested and tried for his wife's murder in April 1876. He was found guilty and sentenced to death. Michael Connelly was executed at Tamworth on 28 June 1876, exactly a week after the hanging of George Pitt at Mudgee. Connelly's was the first execution to be carried out at Tamworth. The prisoner "walked steadily to the gallows"; he betrayed no emotion and refused to confess or repent, only repeating a number of times, "I have nothing to say, I have no business to be here". Tucker, as principal executioner, placed the white cap over Connelly's head and adjusted the noose. Howard stood on the south side of the scaffold as Tucker pushed the lever to release the trapdoor and Connelly dropped about seven feet. It was recorded that "death was instantaneous", although "the usual convulsive twitches followed some four or five minutes after the drop". Later, as the body was being placed in the coffin, the two hangmen lighted a fire in the yard and performed the customary task of burning the rope used in the hanging.

==== Daniel Boon ====
The next execution supervised by Tucker and Howard was that of Daniel Boon at Wagga Wagga, which was carried out 19 July 1876. Boon was a well-known publican of the Home Hotel in Wagga. On the afternoon of 10 January 1876 he went to the North Wagga yard of the blacksmith, Alexander McMullen, carrying a double-barrelled gun. After arguing with McMullen about unpaid rent, Boon raised his gun and shot the blacksmith in the neck and shoulder. McMullen was gravely wounded and died after eight days. At Boon's trial for "wilful murder" in April 1876, his defence counsel argued that the crime was manslaughter, inasmuch as the prisoner could not be held accountable as "on the verge of lunacy from drink" when he committed the crime. The jury returned a guilty verdict, but "with a recommendation to mercy", however the judge proceeded to pass a sentence of death upon Boon. A petition requesting a commutation of the sentence was submitted to the colonial government, but in June the Executive Council decided "the law shall take its course".

In mid-June 1876 Tucker and Howard travelled by mail coach from Sydney to carry out Boon's execution at Wagga Wagga. The coach arrived at Gundagai on Saturday, 15 July. As the coach was about to resume the journey, Tucker jumped from the vehicle and "assaulted a police officer". The principal executioner was described as "a person exquisitely dressed, with the appearance of a gentleman". The offender was arrested and, when his identity and profession was revealed, the police organised for a special court to be held before a justice of the peace so Tucker could be "summarily dealt with so as to enable him to proceed on his business". He was fined forty shillings for the offence, but was arrested again for his own protection when it was discovered he was suffering from delirium tremens. On the following morning Tucker continued his journey to Wagga Wagga. When Tucker arrived at Wagga he found accommodation at "one of the first-class hotels in town". Described as "an individual neatly dressed in black", the hangman socialised with others at the hotel, dining "with the gentlemen of the district" and family of the publican. After a drinking bout and further socialising, Tucker's "conduct came under the notice of the police, when it was discovered to the horror of those brought in contact with him that the obtrusive visitor was the public executioner of the colony".

Boon was executed within the walls of the Wagga Wagga Gaol on Wednesday, 19 July. The journalist for the Wagga Wagga Express provided descriptions of the principal executioner and his assistant. The chief hangman, Tucker (who the journalist named as "William Tuckett"), was dressed in black clothes, "the very minuitiæ of his toilette having received scrupulous care". It was noted that Tucker had "attracted attention elsewhere". In regard to the assistant hangman, Howard, the journalist wrote that his "naturally repulsive appearance was heightened by the absence of any nose", which proved "a very fitting foil" to Tucker's immaculate attire. It was reported that Boon's death was "nearly instantaneous... beyond a convulsive twitching of the body". His remains were conveyed to the cemetery in the afternoon, and interred in the Roman Catholic section. The convicted murderer's funeral was "largely attended", but was described as a "demoralizing exhibition" by the local journalist, who wrote that "anyone would have thought that the plumes and trappings, the string of vehicles and horsemen, were the marks of respect with which a worthy resident was being conveyed to an honoured grave, and not a murderer to a felon's grave".

Before returning to Sydney, Tucker stopped at Gundagai and appeared before the Police Magistrate to finalise the matter of his earlier assault on the police officer. He stated before the Police Magistrate that "it was the worry and anxiety attending his position that brought him into the row". The Common Hangman then added that "he was sure that his profession would drive him mad, as it takes a man with very strong nerves to execute a man, and he felt that he was not equal to it, and he intended to give it up". Tucker was then discharged "as he appeared all right".

Eventually, the Sydney cabmen became aware that one of their number had been engaged as an assistant executioner. When it was put to Howard, he "did not deny it". Soon afterwards he sold his cab and horses and took up a permanent position in the civil service.

=== Principal hangman ===
Howard was living with his family in Woolloomooloo when he began working as assistant hangman. By the late 1870s, after he had been appointed principal hangman, Howard lived with his family in a cottage in Paddington, which he owned freehold. The cottage was in Weden Lane, described as "a quiet part of Paddington". Howard received an annual salary of £150, payable monthly, for his services as the colonial executioner. As a salaried civil servant, Howard was employed as a "general utility" during the periods when his services as executioner were not required. His duties included garden maintenance on the grounds of the Darlinghurst Courthouse and attending to the sheriff's horse and buggy.

==== Thomas Newman ====
Thomas Newman was hanged on 29 May 1877 at Dubbo Gaol, the first judicial execution carried out at Dubbo. Although newspaper accounts of Newman's death do not name the executioner and his assistant, the author Rachel Franks describes this hanging as the first to be carried out by Howard as the principal executioner. Thomas Newman murdered a 12-year-old child, Mary Ann McGregor, on 18 February 1877 at 'Ulamambri' station near Coonabarabran. The child had been visiting a neighbour and was returning to her home in the late afternoon. Newman was a shepherd living in the woolshed near the neighbour's house; he followed the girl and raped and murdered her. The child's body was found the next day with a section of rope, tightly knotted, around her neck. Injuries to the victim's body, which included teeth-marks on her face and part of her nose missing, indicated a desperate struggle against her attacker. Newman was tried in the Dubbo Circuit Court in April. The jury returned a verdict of guilty and he was sentenced to death.

In the condemned cell, on the morning of the execution, as the hangman and his assistant were securing Newman's elbows with rope, the prisoner whispered to the clergymen who were present: "Don't let them hurt me". On the scaffold, as the hangman arranged the rope around the prisoner's neck, Newman said, "Don't put it on too tight". The white cap was drawn over Newman's face and the principal executioner stepped aside; his assistant then released the bolt. The body fell and "swung in the cold morning air a lifeless corpse".

==== Peter Murdick (alias Higgins) ====
In December 1877 Howard travelled to Wagga Wagga to carry out the execution of Robert Murdick (alias Higgins). Murdick had been tried and convicted in October 1877 for the murder of his companion, Henry Ford, eight months earlier. Murdick and Ford had worked together on 'Barmedman' station. In February 1877 the pair left to travel to Wagga Wagga in a spring cart. On the evening of Monday, 26 February, they arrived at Tewkesbury's public-house, 3 miles (4.8 km) from Wagga on the Junee road. Ford tried to cash a cheque for £31 10s in his possession, but the publican told him he was unable to provide the change. After drinking at the hotel the two men left in the early hours of Tuesday morning to camp on the nearby bank of the Murrumbidgee River. Murdick later arrived alone at Wagga, with Ford's cheque in his possession, which he used to purchase a saddle and bridle. After Murdick's return to Barmedman, when asked about Ford's whereabouts he said his companion had left for Melbourne. In mid-March Henry Ford's body was found in the Murrumbidgee River about two miles below the bridge at North Wagga Wagga. Five days later a detective from Wagga interviewed Murdick at Barmedman and arrested him for Ford's murder.

Howard arrived from Sydney on Saturday, 15 December 1877, to prepare for Murdick's execution. His arrival in the township caused consternation amongst the local hotel-keepers "as it was feared he would want board and accommodation, and none were inclined to give it to him". However, the hangman was put up in the gaol, "and did not show much about the town". On the morning of the execution, Tuesday 18 December, Howard attended the cell to pinion Murdick's elbows. On the platform, with the gaoler and two ministers of religion in attendance, Howard adjusted the rope, tightened the knot and drew the white cap over the prisoner's face. Murdick refused to make any statement from the gallows. As the hangman withdrew to pull the bolt, the prisoner "trembled violently". When the trapdoor opened he "made a clutch at the rope, but it passed through his hand and he dropped about eight feet with a telling thud". Death appeared to be instantaneous and after a few minutes "all muscular action had ceased". Howard probably carried out Murdick's execution by himself, as reports make no mention of an assistant hangman.

==== Ing Chee ====
In May 1878 Howard travelled to Goulburn for the execution of Ing Chee, a Chinese hawker who had been convicted of the murder of a boarding-house keeper named Li Hock, whose premises also served as a gambling-house. Li Hock had been found in his bedroom on Monday night, 17 December 1877, suffering from deep gash wounds to his face, possibly inflicted while he slept. The injured man died about half an hour after he was found. Soon afterwards Ing Chee was found nearby at Payten's Royal Hotel, "washing off blood which was copiously sprinkled on his coat, vest, and trousers". The police were informed and Ing Chee was arrested. Ing Chee was tried at a sitting of the Goulburn Assizes in April 1878, where he was found guilty and sentenced to death.

After the date of Ing Chee's execution had been decided, a Chinese Christian missionary was sent to Goulburn "to instruct the unfortunate man" and endeavour to bring the condemned man "to a perfect state of mind to meet his fate". Howard and his assistant travelled to Goulburn on the night train, which arrived a day before the scheduled execution. The next morning, 28 May 1878, Ing Chee was led from his cell. At the foot of the gallows the prisoner knelt down; the missionary also knelt and "prayed earnestly in the Chinese language for his unfortunate countryman", during which Ing Chee "wept loudly and most bitterly". Before ascending the steps he shook hands with "some half-dozen of his countrymen". On the floor of the scaffold Howard and his assistant "placed Ing Chee on the drop, pulled the cap over his head, and adjusted the rope". His death was "instantaneous", as there was "no movement of the body beyond that caused by the sway of the rope".

==== Death of wife ====
On 22 August 1878 Howard's wife Jane died at their home in Paddington, aged 42 years. The cause of her death was pulmonary congestion, recorded as "pleuritic effusion" of the lungs. After his wife's death Howard raised his children as a sole parent. By 1896 he was able to proudly state to a journalist: "I reared five of a family, brought them up without their mother, whom death removed... They have all turned out good and biddable children, and have not given me nor anyone else any trouble".

In May 1879, almost nine months after his wife's death, Howard's eldest daughter Mary married a carpenter named Edward Hawkins.

==== Alfred ====
In June 1879 Howard and his assistant travelled to Mudgee to carry out the execution of an Aboriginal stockman named 'Alfred', who had been convicted of the rape of Jane Dowd, a sixty-year-old widow living at Three Mile Flat near Maryvale, nine miles (14 km) north-west of Wellington. Alfred acknowledged his guilt after being apprehended by the police, a crime he had committed while intoxicated. He was tried at the Mudgee Circuit Court on 17 April 1879 and sentenced to death. Alfred's crime and subsequent death sentence became associated with another rape case, tried at Bathurst a week later. On 24 April Alexander Medcalf and Charles Gillespie (alias Wilkinson) were convicted in the Bathurst Circuit Court for the rape of 16 year-old Amelia Smith and both young men were sentenced to death. The death sentences of Medcalf and Wilkinson in particular led to a series of public meetings and petitions for clemency to the Executive Council of the New South Wales colonial government. The death sentence of the Aboriginal man Alfred was also invoked, but as an article in the Sydney Mail pointed out, "in the current agitation little is heard of the unfortunate Alfred; Medcalf and Wilkinson almost monopolise the compassionate oratory and petitions, and Alfred is apparently only dragged in for consistency's sake". The Executive Council met on two occasions in May 1879 to consider both the Mudgee and Bathurst cases of criminals condemned to death for rape, but in each instance decided "that the law shall take its course". The date of Alfred's execution was set for 10 June and for Medcalf and Wilkinson, 17 June.

As the dates of the executions drew nearer, political pressure in the form of public demonstrations and deputations increased. However the agitation failed to save Alfred's life. In a memorandum to the Executive Council dated 6 June 1879, the Acting Governor, Sir Alfred Stephen, concluded: "If, carrying out the deliberate determination of the Legislature, the Death penalty in gross and clear cases of Rape is ever to be enforced, it was in my opinion clearly a duty to inforce it in the case of this aboriginal". Howard and his assistant (identified as Risby) carried out the execution of Alfred on 10 June 1879 at Mudgee Gaol. An account of the hanging, published in Sydney's Evening News newspaper, was highly critical of the judicial execution of the Aborigine and the role of the Acting Governor. The article pointed out that mercy had been "uniformly extended for many years past to every criminal, whether black or white, convicted of rape unaccompanied by fatal violence". The article included an unflattering description of Robert Howard: "The hangman, 6ft 2in in height, broad shouldered, spider-legged, with arms like a gorilla, a flat face without a nose, and huge feet, presented a spectacle to be seen nowhere else out of Hades".

Three days after Alfred was hanged at Mudgee, the Executive Council met in Sydney and agreed to the commutation of the sentences of Medcalf and Wilkinson to imprisonment for life. When Robert Howard was informed that the two young men had been reprieved, he was reported to have responded: "I cannot tell you how glad I am", adding, "I dreaded carrying out the sentence on one so young, for I feared I should never be able to go through with it".

In early July 1879 Howard was charged at the Water Police Court with having been drunk and using obscene language in Paddington Street, for which he was fined ten shillings.

==== The Wantabadgery bushrangers ====
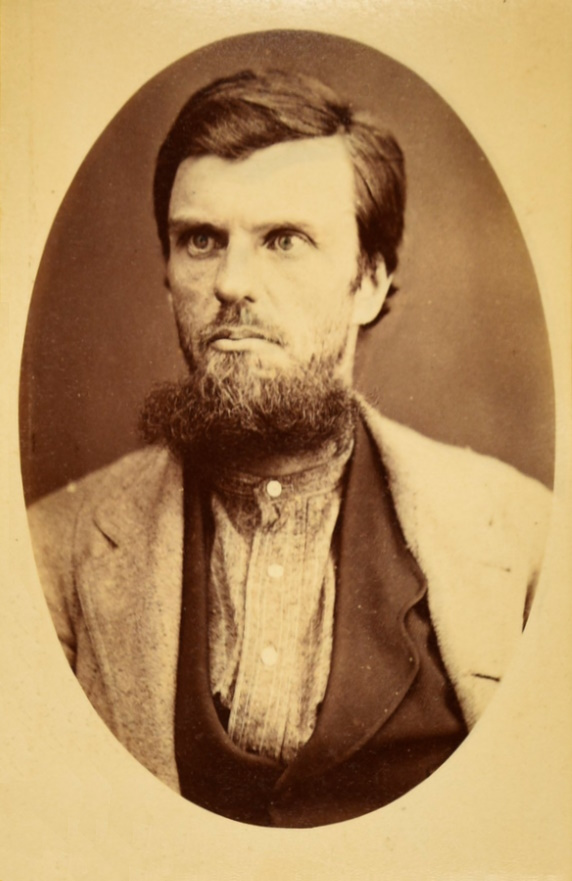
Andrew George Scott ('Captain Moonlite").

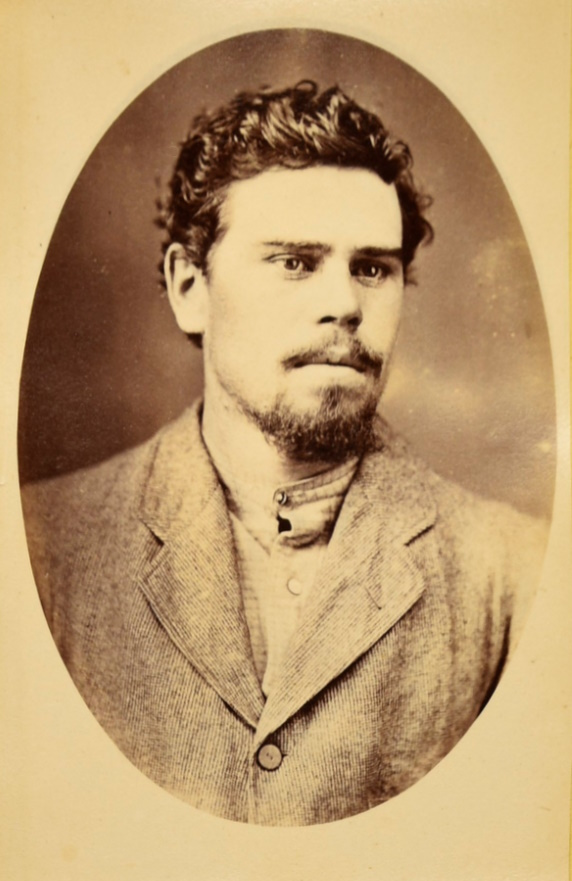
Thomas Rogan.

Prisoner photographs, taken on 26 November 1879 at Darlinghurst Gaol.

In January 1880 Howard supervised the execution of two bushrangers, Andrew George Scott (known as 'Captain Moonlite') and Thomas Rogan, for the murder of Senior-constable Edward Webb Bowen, who was mortally wounded during a confrontation with police in November 1879 at McGlede's farm near 'Wantabadgery' station, east of Wagga Wagga. The shoot-out between the police and Moonlite's gang resulted in the deaths of two of the bushrangers and the capture of four others, including the leader. Senior-constable Bowen was wounded in the neck during the encounter and died six days later. The four captured bushrangers were charged with Bowen's murder. They were tried in Sydney in December 1879; the jury found all four guilty, but recommended mercy for all except Scott. The four bushrangers were each sentenced to death, but after public agitation for mercy the Governor, Lord Loftus, granted a reprieve for two of the condemned men (both sentences commuted to imprisonment for life), leaving the law to take its course for Rogan and Scott.

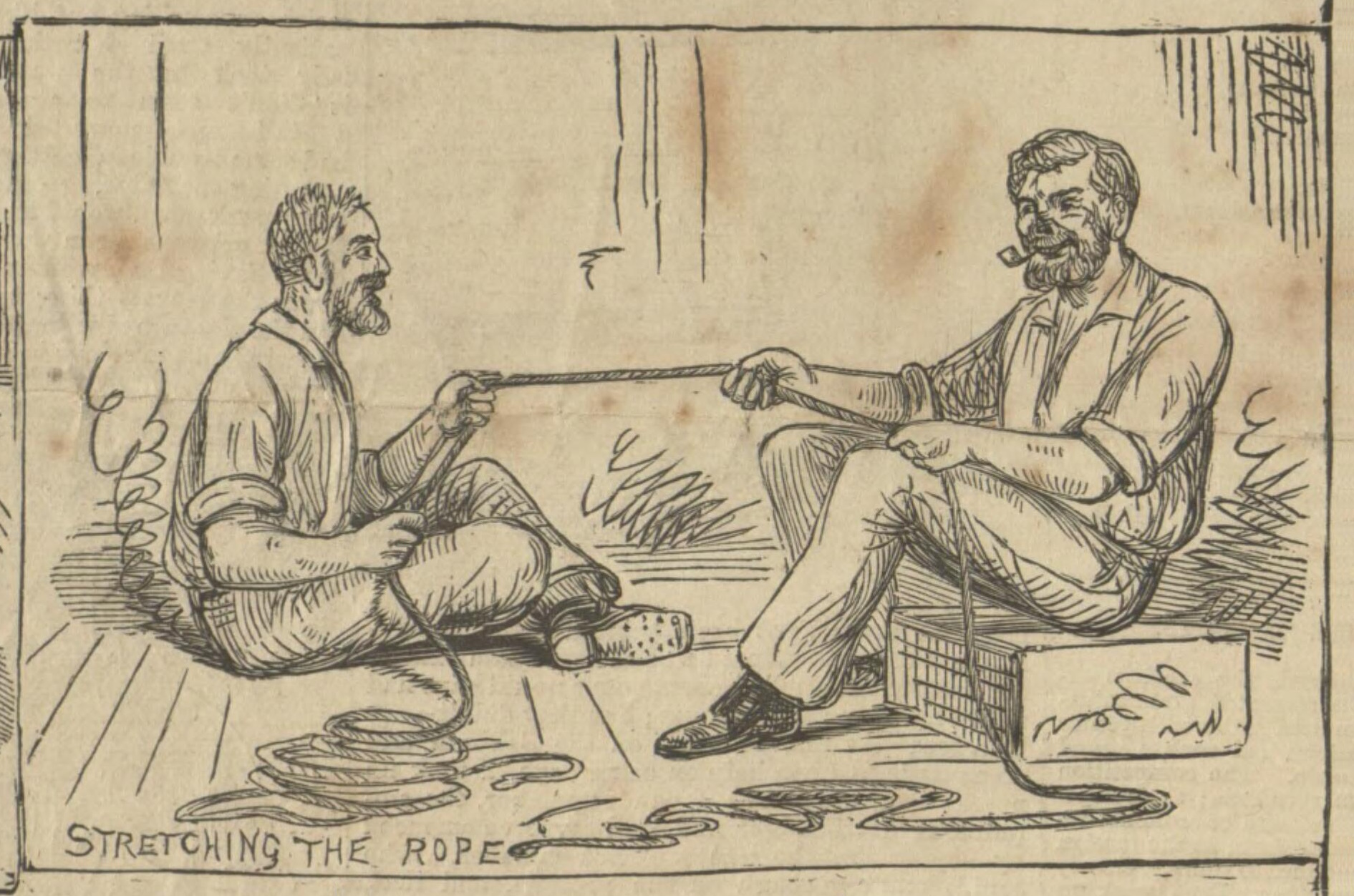
Howard and his assistant stretching the rope as part of the preparation for an execution (published in The Bulletin, 31 January 1880).

The two condemned men were executed side-by-side at Darlinghurst Gaol on the morning of 20 January 1880, the hangings conducted by Howard and his assistant, Risby. After the white caps were drawn over their faces, Scott extended his hand to Rogan and said: "Good-bye Tom; we have made a sad mistake". After the bolt was drawn, Scott died "almost instantaneously", but "Rogan quivered for about four minutes", his mouth twitching convulsively. The death register from Darlinghurst Gaol records that Scott's death was as a result of a neck fracture and Rogan died from asphyxiation. Prior to the executions an estimated crowd of four thousand had gathered outside the walls of Darlinghurst Gaol. Some in the crowd climbed nearby trees or ascended the roofs of houses in the vicinity, even though no view of the gallows was possible.

The execution of the Wantabadgery bushrangers was the basis of a feature article written by J. F. Archibald in the first issue of The Bulletin magazine, published on 31 January 1880. The article included a lengthy interview with the executioner, 'Nosey Bob' Howard, conducted by Archibald at Howard's cottage in Paddington prior to the execution on 20 January. The hangman expressed his satisfaction with his lot in life. The path to the door of his cottage was "over-arched by vines laden with ripening grapes", with Howard describing his garden as "the prettiest... in Paddington – the biggest cabbages and the finest flowers". Howard told the journalist: "I bring up my children well", proudly proclaiming that his children attend school and were the equal in neatness, cleanliness and good manners as any children in Paddington. During the interview Howard described his preparations for an execution: "The night before, I fixes all the things as I remember, and then I takes my pipe in my mouth and I walks up and down and says to myself – 'Is there anything more' – and if there's anything more I thinks of it". He added: "It doesn't do to get flurried, for the day you gets flurried that's the day as you makes the mistake". In regard to the condemned prisoners, Howard explained: "I always gets their height and weight, but I don't go near 'em till their time comes".

Reports of the executions of Scott and Rogan in January 1880 were the first occasions in which colonial newspapers began to refer to the principal hangman in New South Wales as 'Nosey Bob'. Archibald's description of Howard in his January 1880 article was particularly harsh: "The creature looked what he lives to be – a human ghoul, a fiend incarnate". The hangman's physical attributes were described as "ape-like... six feet high, broad-shouldered, long-armed, flat-footed, and sinewy".

==== Hangings at Dubbo and Tamworth ====
In May 1880 Howard and his assistant travelled to Dubbo to carry out the execution of 'Albert', a young Aboriginal police-tracker convicted of the murder of another Indigenous man named 'Nugle Jack'. On the night of 15 December 1879 'Albert' shot at 'Nugle Jack' and his partner named 'Sally', as they slept at their camp-site near Baradine. The bullet first struck the woman and glanced off her ribs, before fatally wounding 'Nugle Jack' as he lay beside her. 'Albert' was tried at the Dubbo Circuit Court and sentenced to death. The prisoner held out hope for a reprieve of the death sentence, saying he knew he would be hanged if he "killed a whitefellow, but not for killing a blackfellow". In early May 1880, however, the Executive Council met to decide his fate and "decided that the sentence of death should be carried out". The morning of his execution, 26 May 1880, was cold and bleak with a "keen frosty wind blowing". The prisoner was shivering violently as he stood on the scaffold erected within Dubbo Gaol; Howard had to support him as the rope was adjusted and the white cap drawn over his face. When the bolt was drawn the condemned man's death was instantaneous.

In early June, a fortnight after the hanging in Dubbo, Howard and his assistant travelled to Tamworth to supervise the execution of Dan King, a Chinese tin-miner, convicted of the murder of Elizabeth ('Lizzie') Hart. Dan King and Lizzie Hart had been living together on the tin mines near Inverell for several months prior to her death. Hart left him, coming to Tamworth and began living there with Charley Hung Yung. In the days before the murder, Dan King was observed making "murderous threats against Lizzie". On 27 December 1879 Lizzie Hart was found murdered at the rear of the Town and Country Hotel, with "several fatal wounds in her neck and on her body". In early April 1880 Dan King was convicted of her murder in the Tamworth Circuit Court and sentenced to death. The scaffold was erected within Tamworth Gaol. On the morning of the execution, 11 June 1880, Dan King's arms were pinioned in the usual manner. On the walk to the gallows the condemned man stopped and knelt; in a weak voice he sang "what was said to be a hymn in Chinese". He was assisted up the steps by Howard and his assistant. After being placed on the trap he "renewed his lugubrious chanting and continued for some four minutes, trembling a great deal in the legs". After a brief prayer by the gaol chaplain, "the finishers of the law" adjusted the white cap and the noose and, after a signal given by the Sheriff, drew the bolt. Dan King's death was reported to be instantaneous, though for seven minutes after the drop regular muscular contractions continued to occur. After the body was lowered into the coffin, the rope was taken down and, in the usual practice, burned in the gaol-yard. The report of Dan King's execution in the Tamworth News made the following observation: "The whole of the horrible business was conducted with the utmost decorum, and the fearful work of the executioners was done with all the satisfaction possible under the painful circumstances attendant on their duties".

=== 'Finisher of the law' ===
An 1880 newspaper article referred to executioners as "finishers of the law", and an 1897 biographical article about Howard in Sydney's Truth newspaper was titled "The Finisher of the Law".

Howard's 18-year-old daughter Emily died in December 1880 at Paddington. She had suffered from a heart disease for at least nine years and had developed dropsy prior to her death.

==== William Brown ====
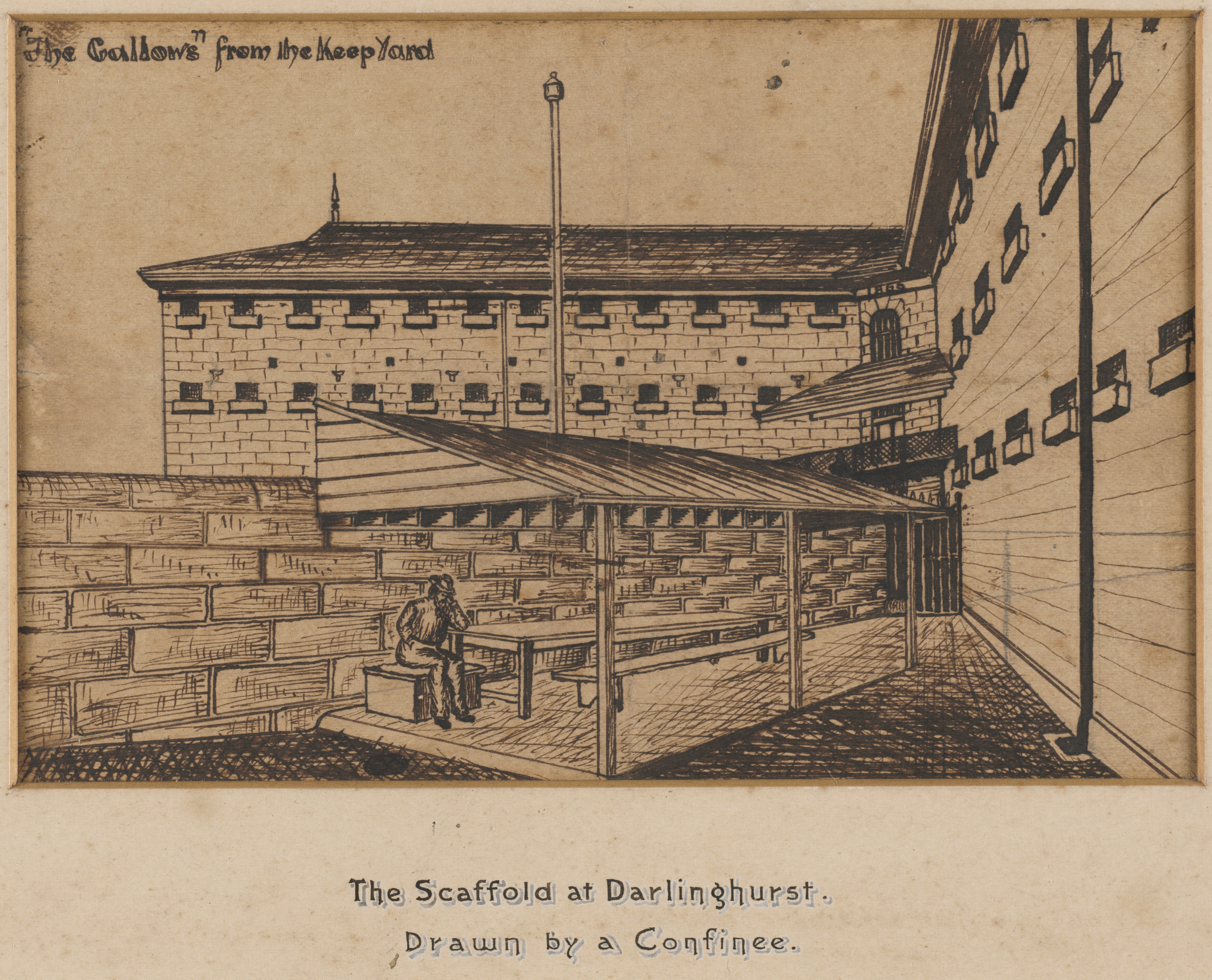
A view of the permanent gallows at Darlinghurst Gaol (drawn by an inmate from the yard below).

Robert Howard supervised the execution of William Brown, who was hanged at Darlinghurst Gaol on 29 March 1881. William Brown was a farmer at Yappa Brush within a wide bend of the Manning River called The Bight, opposite Wingham township on the mid-north coast of New South Wales. Brown had been separated from his wife for the past six years. He was tried in February 1881 in the Central Criminal Court in Sydney, charged with the rape of his daughter Ann, aged twelve years. The offence had occurred at his residence and had been witnessed by two of his other children, William and Bridget (who gave evidence at Brown's trial). The accused man protested his innocence, claiming "that his children had conspired together to take his life". After being found guilty and sentenced to death, Brown requested the judge to allow his four children "to be ranged alongside him when the rope was being put round his neck, and that the scene might be illustrated by the Press" (a request which was declined). Brown had "a pallid and death-like appearance" as he was led onto the scaffold in March 1881. He kissed the crucifix held by his attendant priest, and then kissed the priest's hand. Howard adjusted the white cap and rope and then signaled his assistant, who struck "the iron handle that works the drop". Brown's death appeared to have been immediate; "not a muscle moved, nor was there the slightest twitch" as he hung suspended, six feet below the scaffold.

==== Henry Wilkinson ====
On the evening of 27 May 1881 Howard and his assistant boarded the mail train for Goulburn, on their way to Albury to supervise the execution of a convicted murderer, Henry Wilkinson. The two men took their seats in a second-class carriage. Howard was described as a big man, presenting an unprepossessing appearance, noseless and "bearded like the pard". His assistant was described as one who, "not nearly so large in stature, was almost as uninviting in looks". By the time the train reached Parramatta, Howard had fallen asleep. His companion suddenly jumped up and declared he had been robbed of a purse containing three half-sovereigns by another passenger in the carriage, "and swore he would have it out of them". This roused Howard who, "saying that he always came prepared for emergencies of the kind, pulled out a six-barrel revolver, and threatened violence if the money was not immediately returned to his mate". When the train reached Marulan, the accused passengers called for the assistance of the police. A police officer boarded the train and rode in the carriage to Goulburn, where a sergeant and several constables were waiting at the station. When he was interviewed by the police, the hangman's assistant declined "to make a charge against the man he suspected... assigning as a reason that his business compelled him to go on by the train, and he could not stay". When the sergeant turned his lamp upon Howard, "with a sudden start" of recognition he exclaimed: "It's you is it; off you go!". The policeman then dismissed the complaint. The writer reporting the incident concluded: "If the hangman and his assistant must be carried by train from Sydney to the place where they are about to carry out their degrading business, they should certainly not be allowed to get into carriages in which there are respectable persons". Another account recommended to all overland travellers, "within a week or two of a provincial hanging, to count noses, well and carefully, before finally choosing their seats".

In April 1881 Henry Wilkinson was convicted in the Albury Circuit Court of the murder of Mary Pumpa. The victim's father, Martin Menz, had kept a wine-shop at Lyster's Gap, near Jindera, where his daughter also lived. At about three o'clock in the morning of 7 December 1880 Wilkinson entered the house. He went to Mary's room and, with a revolver, fired at her twice, inflicting wounds to her head and lungs. Wilkinson then shot Mentz and set fire to the building. Mary Pumpa managed to escape the flames and, drenched in blood, reached a neighbour's house. Wilkinson was arrested nearby later that morning. His victim died in hospital a week later, but was able to give a statement to police and identify Wilkinson as her attacker. Henry Wilkinson was executed within the confines of Albury Gaol on the morning of 1 June 1881. An account of the hanging in Beechworth's Ovens and Murray Advertiser named the hangman as Robert Howard and his assistant as a man named Reed. The journalist commented: "The expeditious manner in which they carried out the just sentence of the law shows that they are not novices at their calling".

==== Assault charge ====
In March 1882 Howard was charged with assaulting a man named Charles MacLean. The incident occurred late at night outside Howard's cottage in Paddington, resulting in MacLean received a fractured skull. MacLean's version was that he was passing by the house on his way home, when Howard's dog, which was lying on the doorstep, "rushed at him". As he attempted to "drive it away", Howard opened his door dressed in a nightshirt and, after abusing MacLean, struck him on the head "with some weapon". Howard's version of events was that MacLean was drunk; he threw stones at Howard's dog and shouted, "Come outside, you —— hangman". When he appeared at the door, Howard claimed that MacLean grabbed his leg and "tried to pull me down the steps", adding: "I then hit him with the leg of the chair to save myself". Howard was allowed bail and committed to stand trial in early April.

At the trial on 4 April at the Court of Quarter Sessions at Darlinghurst, evidence presented by Howard's defence counsel highlighted MacLean's "quarrelsome disposition" and his drunken state on the night of the incident. Howard's next-door neighbour, Margaret Toohey, stated in her evidence that MacLean "threatened to flatten the defendant's face as well as his nose", adding that she considered her neighbour to be "a quiet, inoffensive man". After a short deliberation the jury returned a verdict of not guilty and Howard was discharged.

==== Hangings at Armidale, Goulburn and Deniliquin ====
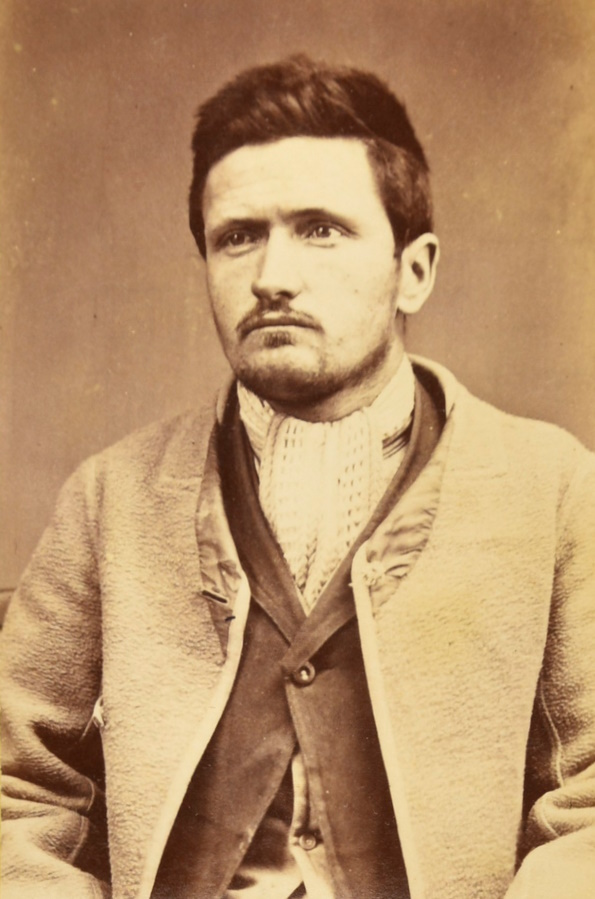
Charles Cunningham, executed at Goulburn Gaol in November 1882.

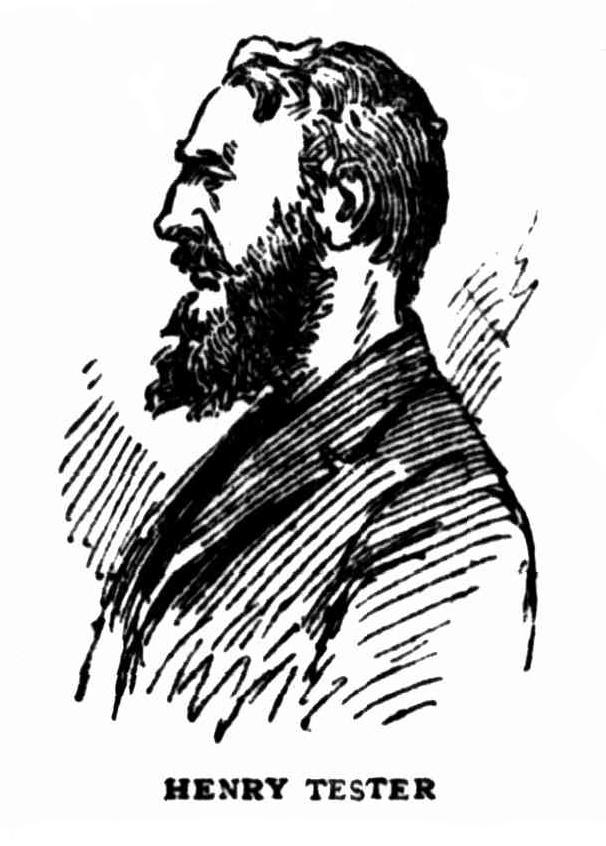
Henry Tester, executed at Deniliquin Gaol in December 1882.

During 1882 Robert Howard was called upon to carry out three executions, each of them in provincial regions of the colony:

- John McGuan was hanged inside the walls of Armidale Gaol on 22 November 1882. In May 1881 the body of an elderly bootmaker named Thomas Smith, considered to be "somewhat eccentric", was found in his hut near Inverell, with a blow to his head caused by a hammer and his throat cut. John McGuan was arrested for the murder. McGuan was tried on three occasions at the Armidale Assizes. On the first two occasions the jury was discharged after the jurists were unable to agree on a verdict, but at the third trial in October 1882, McGuan was convicted of Smith's murder and sentenced to death. After the execution at Armidale it was reported that Howard "had the coach to Uralla all to himself [as] the other passengers refused to travel with him".
- Charles Cunningham was executed within Goulburn Gaol on 29 November 1882. Cunningham was a man in his late-twenties who had spent much of his adult life in prison. He had been sentenced to periods of imprisonment for horse-stealing and bank-robbery. In prison Cunningham had his sentence extended on several occasions after stabbing another prisoner and assaulting a jailer. In September 1882 at Berrima Gaol, Cunningham struck a prison warder, John Izard, with an axe. He was charged with attempted murder, convicted and sentenced to death.
- After supervising the execution of Cunningham at Goulburn, Howard and his assistant travelled to Deniliquin, in the southern Riverina of New South Wales, to carry out the execution, eight days later, of Henry Tester. Tester had been convicted at the Deniliquin Circuit Court in October 1882 of the murder of seven-year-old Louisa Preston at Moira (between Deniliquin and Moama). Louisa, with her younger brother and older sister, were passing Tester's house on their way to school in July 1882, when one of the children threw a stick against the wall of the house "only in fun". Tester rushed from the house and struck the little girl on the head with an axe, and then proceeded to smash her skull with the back of the axe. The hanging of Henry Tester in the gaol-yard at Deniliquin did not go smoothly and was considered to be "a bungling piece of business". For several minutes after the drop, "Tester continued to struggle violently, and it was plain that the neck was not broken by the fall, but that he was suffering death by strangulation only". Bodily contortions continued for twenty minutes; his legs twitched, his arms and head moved and "he was observed to breath for nearly a quarter of an hour afterwards". A report of the execution remarked that "the horrors attending a judicial strangling took place before the eyes of thirty witnesses".

==== George Ruxbourne ====
Howard carried out only one execution in 1883, that of George Ruxbourne who was hanged at Armidale in May. The body of Jimmy Young, an elderly man of Chinese descent, was found on 17 March 1883 in the bed of the creek running through the centre of Armidale. The deceased man had been locally known as "the Chinese doctor". He had severe axe wounds to his head and body, including a wound at the back of the neck "nearly severing the head from the body". A woodcutter named George Ruxbourne was arrested several days later at Tamworth, where he was attempting to cash a bank deposit receipt that had been issued to Jimmy Young. Ruxbourne was tried at the Armidale Circuit Court in April 1883; the jury returned a guilty verdict and he was sentenced to death for the crime described by the judge as "a cold-blooded, deliberate, planned, mercenary murder". George Ruxbourne was hanged on gallows erected within Armidale Gaol on the morning of 23 May 1883.

==== William Rice and Joseph Cordini ====
Howard supervised two executions in 1884:

- William Rice was convicted of murder and hanged at Darlinghurst Gaol on 23 April 1884. The execution was carried out by Howard and his assistant, Charles Begg. Rice was the son of a Woolloomooloo butcher, living at 59 Phelps Street in Surry Hills with a woman named Sophia Holmes. On 28 February 1884, in a state of drunkenness and jealousy, Rice fatally shot James Griffin (or Byrnes), who had been lodging at the house. He was convicted of murder in the Central Criminal Court on 12 March and sentenced to death.
- In June 1884 Howard travelled to Deniliquin to carry out the execution of Joseph Cordini, convicted of the murder of a hawker named George Mizon near Pretty Pine, on the Hay road north of Deniliquin. On 11 October 1883 Mizon was found lying dead beneath his waggon, with gashes to his head which were probably inflicted by a tomahawk. Four days later Cordini, a French bush-worker born in Marseilles, was arrested at Mathoura for the murder. A cheque belonging to the hawker was found in Cordini's possession. He was tried at Deniliquin in April 1884, found guilty and sentenced to death. The evidence on which he was convicted was "purely circumstantial" and relied substantially on testimony given by Albert Stevenson and his wife, who kept "a sort of grog shanty a little off the main road" near where the murder occurred. After the verdict Cordini's defence team, convinced of their client's innocence, agitated for a reprieve "in order that the matter might be more thoroughly investigated". The French Consul-General in Sydney became involved and representations were made to the colonial government. The Executive Council granted a short reprieve while further investigations were carried out, but eventually the Attorney-General decided that allegations promulgated by the defence were unfounded. The execution of Joseph Cordini was carried out by Robert Howard on 13 June 1884 at Deniliquin Gaol. The prisoner maintained his innocence throughout; his last words were: "I did not hurt anyone in my life".

After Cordini's execution at Deniliquin, Howard and his assistant travelled by coach to Hay on their way back to Sydney. They arrived on 17 June and were unable to get beds at any of the hotels, so the local police had to accommodate them in the court-house. The two men had a meal in Tattersall's Hotel and it was reported that "no one would sit at the table with them". On the following day Howard walked "through the mud to the railway station" to catch the train to Sydney, but his assistant attempted to engage a cab. All the local cabmen refused to take him, so he too was compelled to walk to the station. The incidents at Hay were reported in a reproachful manner, describing the executioners' reception at Hay as "unkind" and "a slight", and making the claim that "a great deal of ill-feeling has been aroused in Sydney at the unfriendly treatment, by the Hay people, of the hangman and his assistant".

==== Hangings at Darlinghurst and Grafton ====
During 1885 Robert Howard carried out three executions:

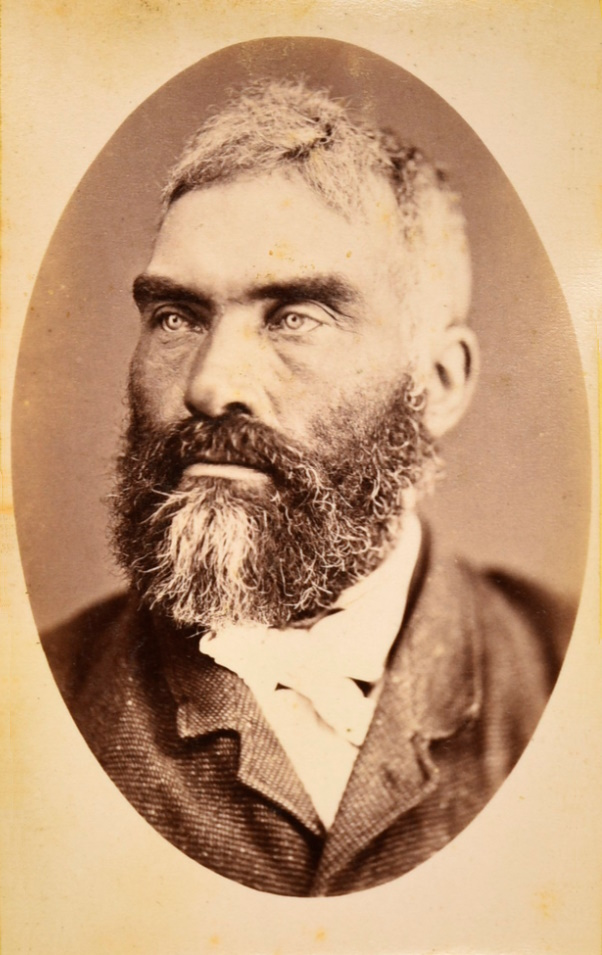
Charles Watson, executed at Darlinghurst Gaol in April 1885.

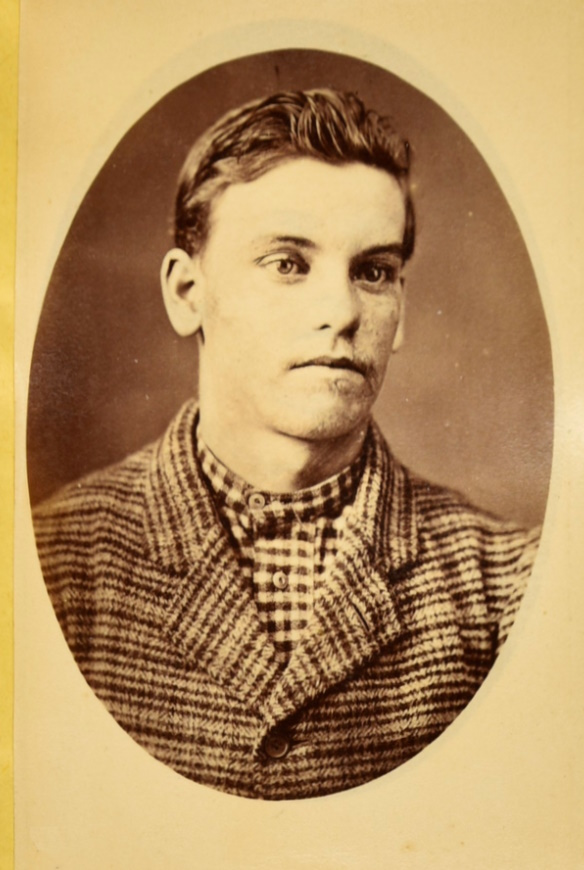
Thomas Williams (alias Johns), photographed in November 1879; executed in July 1885.

- In March 1885, in the Central Criminal Court in Sydney, an elderly man named Charles Watson was sentenced to death after he was convicted of the murder of William Matthews in the vicinity of 'Wyadra' and 'Cowl Cowl' stations near Hillston. In September 1884 Matthews' remains were found floating in the Lachlan River. The skull of the dead man was smashed in and his ankles had been fastened together with fencing wire. Watson was later arrested at Mount Hope. Watson and Matthews had been observed camping together at Gunbar and beside the Lachlan River in late July 1884, when it was believed Matthews was killed. After the murder Watson was in possession of a waggonette and horses belonging to Matthews. On the morning of 14 April 1885, Howard and his assistant carried out the execution of Charles Watson at Darlinghurst Gaol.
- In July 1885 Howard supervised the execution of Thomas Williams (alias Frank Johns), who had been a member of Moonlite's gang of bushrangers. The hangman had executed the leader and another gang member in January 1880 for the murder of Senior-constable Bowen. Williams was aged 19 years when he too was sentenced to death for the same murder, but his sentence was commuted to life imprisonment after the trial. In February 1885, while incarcerated at Parramatta Gaol, he rushed at another prisoner named William Roberts and stabbed him in the chest with a sharpened dinner knife, inflicting a wound which pierced the man's lung. He also attacked two other prisoners and tried to stab a prison-warder before he was subdued. Williams was tried in late May before Justice Windeyer, the same judge who had passed a sentence of death upon the prisoner in December 1879. Williams refused the aid of counsel and conducted his own defence, claiming "temoporary insanity". The jury returned a guilty verdict, with a recommendation to mercy, but Windeyer proceeded to sentence Williams to death. In his address to the court the judge alluded to the fact that he had previously passed the same sentence on the prisoner, saying "he was glad that he had not taken part in causing the commutation of it". Windeyer added: "There was an idea prevailing now that capital punishment would be done away with before long; but he considered that the committal of such crimes as that which the prisoner had been charged was a reason for retaining it". Thomas Williams was hanged from the permanent gallows at Darlinghurst Gaol on 14 July 1885.
- Later in the year Howard and his assistant travelled to Grafton to supervise the execution of Matthew Friske, convicted of the murder of "his mate and countryman" Matts Matteson. Friske and his victim were natives of Finland (then a part of the Russian Empire). Friske was aged 68 years and Matteson was a younger man, aged about 25. The pair worked a selection of land near Coffs Harbour when, during a quarrel which developed into a physical altercation, Friske struck his companion in the back with an axe, killing him. He tried to conceal his crime by burning the body. Friske was hanged at Grafton Gaol on 10 December 1885 by Howard and his assistant.

There were two judicial executions carried out in New South Wales in 1886:

- In June 1886 Howard returned to Grafton for the execution of William Liddiard. In May 1885 the body of Patrick Noonan was discovered in the Richmond River, tangled with the punt rope at East Wardell. The body was inside a bag, with another bag containing stones fastened to the left leg. Noonan had been working for William Liddiard, cutting cane on James' farm at Pimlico, to the north of Wardell. On 12 May Liddiard murdered Noonan with a tomahawk and later, with the assistance of a young man named William Hirlsford, pushed the body into the river from the nearby punt. Liddiard was arrested for the murder and tried in April 1886, found guilty and sentenced to death. Liddiard was executed on 8 June 1886 inside Grafton Gaol; the hanging proceeded in the usual manner, though it was reported that the prisoner's head "was almost severed from the body by the rope".
- In October 1886 at Darlinghurst Gaol Howard carried out the execution of Alfred Reynolds, who had murdered his wife Rhoda. Early evening on 13 August 1886 Reynolds had returned to the family home in Gowrie Street, Newtown, and forced his wife to drink a cup of opium mixed with cold water, while he stood over her with a knife. He had previously forced her to write a suicide letter expressing a wish to die for an unspecified "wrong", and absolving her husband of any blame. When Rhoda consumed the opium, Reynolds left the house. As she began feeling ill, Rhoda gathered her youngest child and went to her mother's house, two doors away. She told her mother what had happened and the police were called. Rhoda Reynolds lived long enough to give a statement detailing the circumstances of her poisoning. Alfred Reynolds pleaded guilty at his trial on 31 August in the Central Criminal Court, and was sentenced to death. He was executed on 8 October 1886. Howard allowed for a drop of six feet "to effect the necessary severing of the spinal cord in the case of a man of Reynold's weight". After the hanging the post-mortem revealed the prisoner's neck had been broken in two places.

==== The Mount Rennie rape executions ====
The gallows at Darlinghurst Gaol was "simply a small platform erected in an external angle" of the walls of a building located at the north-east corner of the gaol, near the corner of Burton Street and Darlinghurst Road. Above the platform was a "stout beam" from which a rope and noose could be hung. The scaffold was not obtrusive "and it might be passed without recognition by almost anyone". The structure was completed in 1869 and was considered to be an improved design which enabled the condemned prisoner to walk directly from his cell within the building to the gallows, without having to ascend steps. The names of those hanged from the gallows at Darlinghurst Gaol were recorded on a beam above the scaffold. At the end of 1886 fifteen names were recorded on the beam; of the fifteen, six of the hangings had been carried out under Robert Howard's supervision. By the first week of January 1887, however, Howard's tally increased by the addition of a further four names.

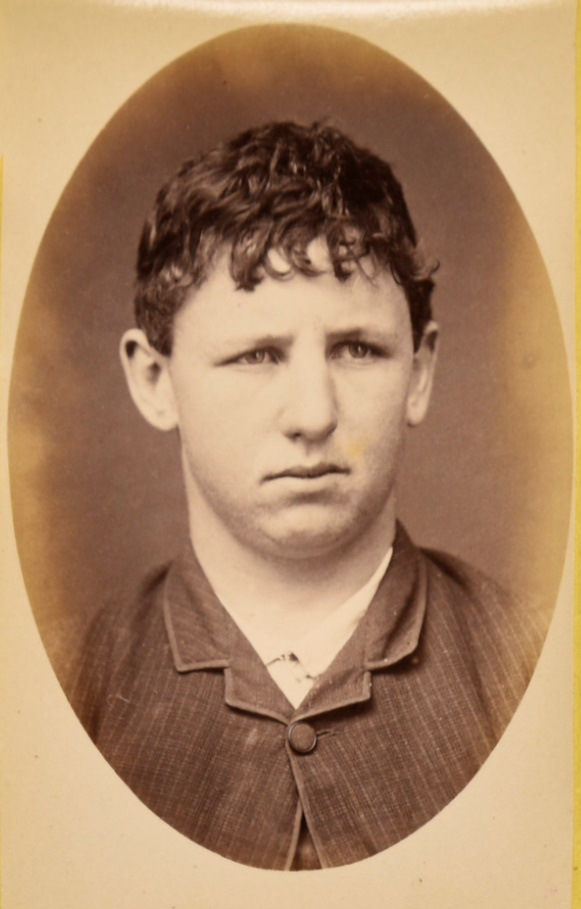
George Duffy, aged 18 years.

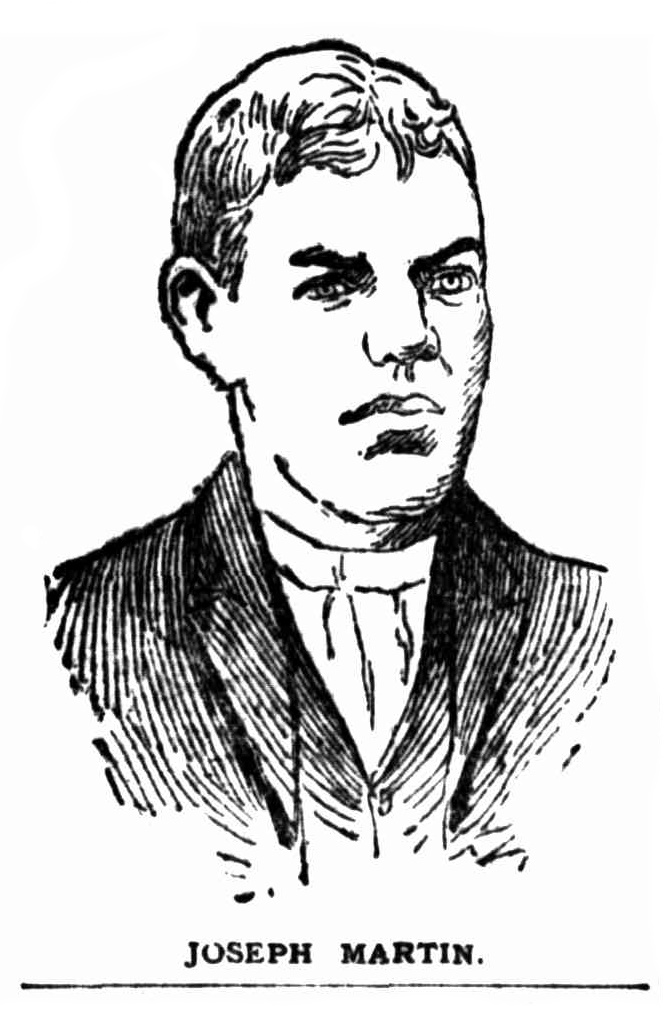
Joseph Martin, aged 17 years.

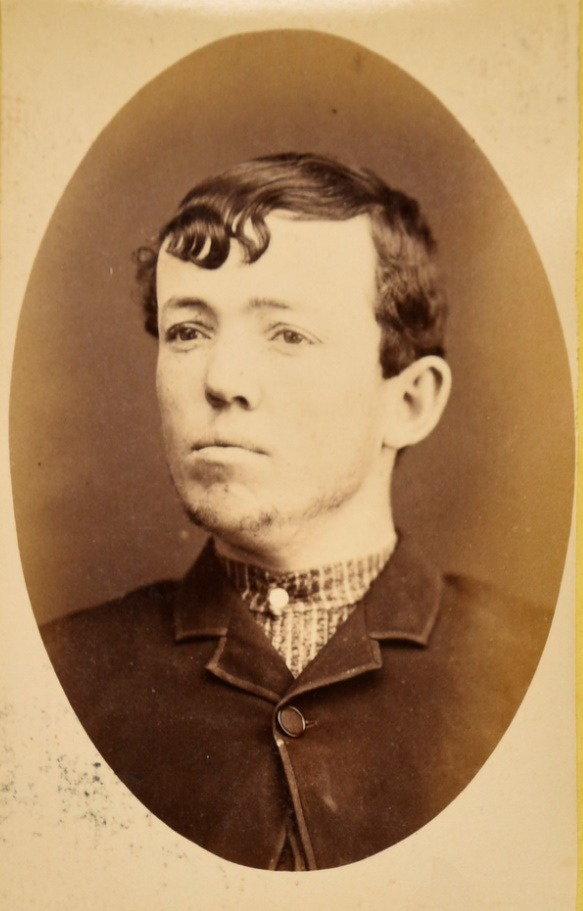
William Boyce, aged 20 years.

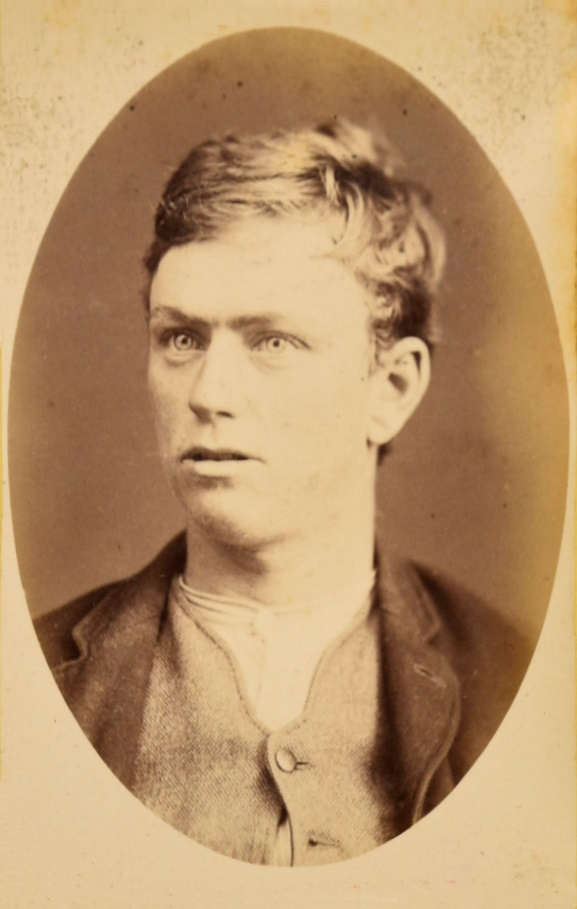
Robert George Read, aged 19 years.

The Mount Rennie rapists, executed at Darlinghurst Gaol on 7 January 1887.

In November 1886 eleven young men were tried for the gang-rape of sixteen year-old Mary Jane Hicks on 9 September 1886, in bushland near the suburb of Waterloo (a location known as Mount Rennie). The trial was conducted over six days in the Central Criminal Court before Justice Windeyer. Nine of the young men were convicted of the crime and two were acquitted. The nine convicted prisoners were sentenced to death by Justice Windeyer. Eight of the nine were aged from 17 to 19 years (with the other aged 22 years). An intense public campaign was waged, advocating that the death penalty was too harsh for the nine perpetrators. On 22 December the Executive Council granted a reprieve to three of the Mount Rennie rapists, commuting their sentences to imprisonment for life. The execution date for the remaining six was set for 7 January 1887. Several days before the executions the gallows at Darlinghurst Gaol were erected in a new position in E wing of the prison, "the construction of which was entrusted to Messrs. Hudson Brothers". The location of the gallows erected in 1869 had the disadvantage of being visible from elevated positions outside the prison walls and within the hearing of any "shouts and cries of a crowd" gathered outside the walls. The erection of the gallows in its new position sought to correct these factors. In addition, the scaffold was expanded in order to accommodate the expected simultaneous execution of the six convicted prisoners. On 6 January, the day before the impending executions, a further two of the condemned prisoners had their sentences commuted to life imprisonment. The four who remained under sentence of death – George Duffy, Joseph Martin, William Boyce and Robert Read – were executed the following morning.

The execution of the four convicted rapists took place on the morning of 7 January 1887 within the walls of Darlinghurst Gaol, in the presence "of an unusually large number of spectators" (such that one reporter described the execution as "being more of a public than a private nature"). Outside the gates a crowd of about two thousand had gathered, "composed of all classes, but chiefly of young men, some of unmistakable larrikin stamp". As the four "condemned youths" were led onto the scaffold, attended by gaol officials and the prisoners' spiritual advisors, "absolute silence fell upon" those witnessing the executions. Howard and his assistant placed the white caps, "the halters were quickly adjusted, and in a second the bolt was drawn". The hangings on this occasion were some of Howard's least successful executions, with one report stating that "the whole affair was sadly bungled". Of the four only Duffy had his spinal cord fractured, the others died from strangulation. It was estimated that Martin lived for ten minutes after the drop. In falling his arm was caught in a loop of the rope and for thirty seconds his pinioned elbow was bent up to his ear. Martin kicked violently and contorted his body, making frantic efforts to free his arms. Boyce "also suffered terribly, kicking and endeavouring to jerk his head from the rope". Duffy "shivered and kicked convulsively" after the drop. Read "struggled the least of all after the knot slipped from behind his right ear to almost under the chin". Howard later asserted that the number of people upon the scaffold had "so crowded him that he was unable to 'do justice to his work'".

==== Move to Bondi ====
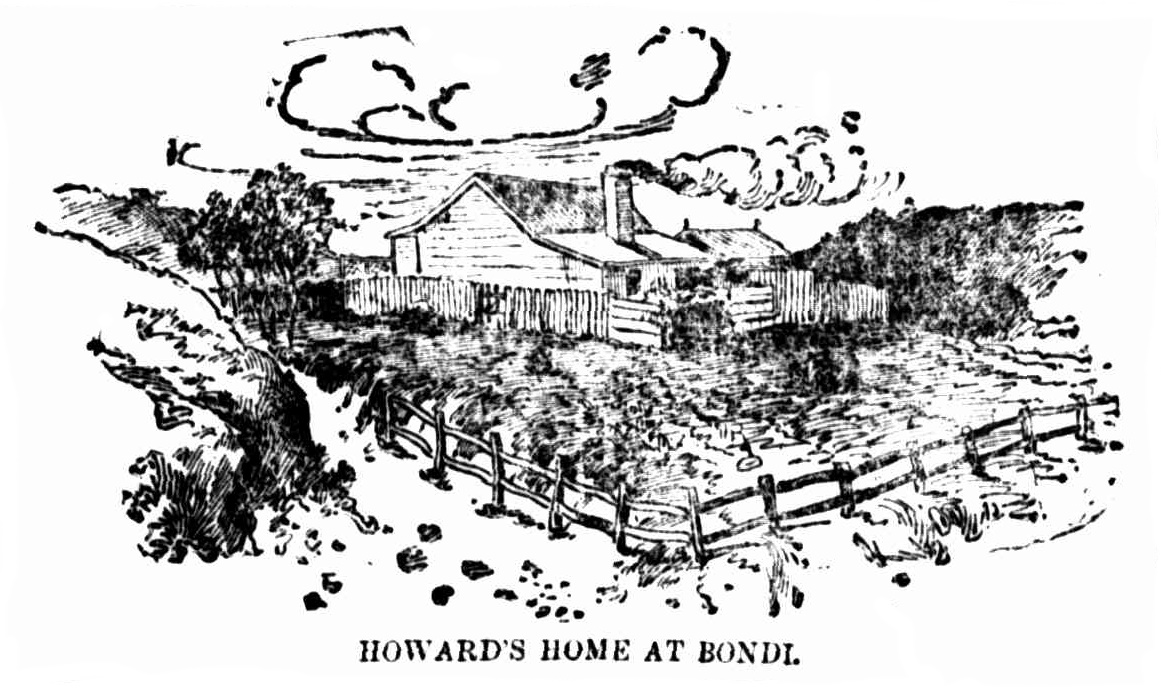
Howard's cottage at Bondi, an illustration published in the Truth newspaper, 20 January 1901.

In about 1887 Howard began living in a four-roomed weatherboard cottage at North Bondi, in close proximity to Bondi Beach, where he lived with or in close proximity to members of his family until his death in 1906. Howard's cottage was built in Brighton Boulevard on Ben Buckler Point, near the northern end of Bondi Beach, one of the first cottages built in that locality. His house was described as standing "in an isolated and somewhat lonely position". The cottage had a view of the ocean to the east and south-east. It was described as "a breezy, picturesque and healthy spot, the hill at the rear, with its scrub and wild flowers and rocks forming a dark green background". At that time the Bondi area was sparsely populated, described as a "quiet suburb", and serviced by a tram from the more populated inner city.

In November 1887 Robert Howard was assaulted and maltreated by a group of young men as he was returning to his home at North Bondi. The report of the incident in the Evening News cited the case as an example of the "larrikin nuisance" occurring at Bondi, carried out by young men "whose numbers and audacity seem to increase and grow in exact proportion to the laxity of the police supervision". In Howard's case his assailants appeared to "have a prejudice against" the hangman's profession and resented "his having exercised it on some of their friends" (a probable reference to the executions of the Mount Rennie rapists in January 1887).

The episode occurred at about four o'clock in the afternoon. After he had finished work for the day, Howard travelled from Darlinghurst by tram and called in at Brown's public-house at Bondi for a beer. After being served, the barman began an aggressive exchange with his customer, saying: "You are the one that put the rope on the neck of Moonlight and Rogan". The barman then took Howard's beer "and pitched it out into the sand". As he later described the incident, Howard was then set upon by the four young men at the hotel, who struck him about the head and kicked him, and "said they would hang me". He managed to escape and ran back towards the tram depot, but was unable to find anyone to assist him. After a while Howard ventured back past Brown's public-house, which he had to pass to reach his home. The four young men were on the verandah and assaulted him again; they tore his coat and attempted to throw him over the road embankment. As described by Howard: "They swore they would settle me some day, and burn my place down".

==== Executions in 1888 and 1889 ====
After the execution of the Mount Rennie rapists, more than one year elapsed before Howard was required to carry out another execution. In May 1888 he and his assistant travelled to Armidale to supervise the execution of John Grace (alias Creighan), convicted of the murder of John Stapleton near the mining township of Hillgrove, east of Armidale. Stapleton's body was discovered in January 1888 with a battered skull and his throat cut. Stapleton and John Grace were in each other's company in the days before the murder and so Grace was arrested on suspicion. He was tried at Armidale in April 1888 and, although the evidence was circumstantial, the jury delivered a guilty verdict and he was sentenced to death. Grace was executed at Armidale Gaol on 29 May 1888.

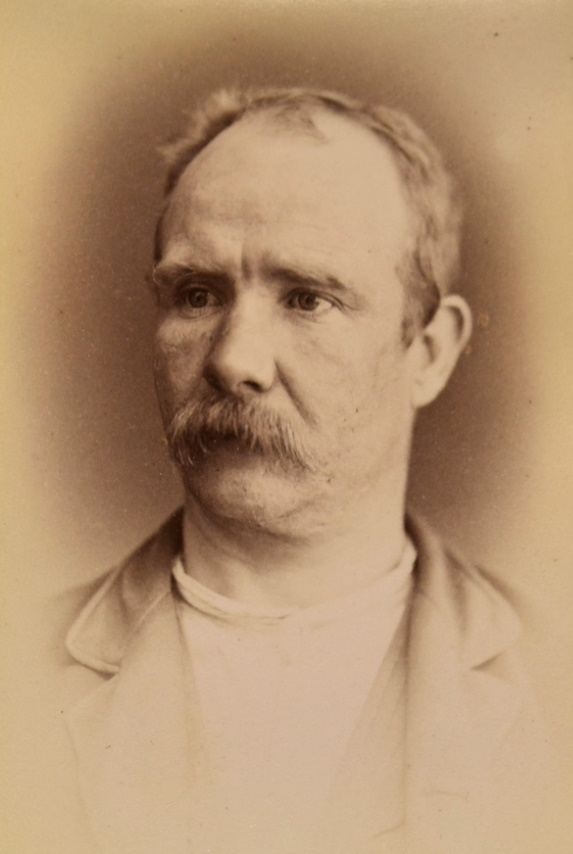
Robert Hewart, executed at Darlinghurst Gaol in September 1888.

On the evening of 25 May 1888 Robert Hewart, in a drunken state, was charged with property damage and placed in a cell at the Central Police Station in Sydney. The other occupant of the cell was a man named Thomas Park, who had been previously arrested in Hyde Park for drunkenness. Later in the evening, as the policeman on duty was about to place another man in the cell, Park was found unconscious and lying face downwards on the floor; his "lower garments were lying at his feet, and there were blood-stains in the region of his thighs". On investigation, Park was found to be "horribly mutilated", with "some flesh" found amongst the blood on the floor. The victim was taken to Sydney Hospital where medical examination revealed two wounds, each about two inches in length, which "presented the appearance of tears, not cuts". Police later found a pocket-knife in Hewart's possession. Park remained under treatment but died on 3 June from pyaemia. In early August 1888 Hewart was tried in the Central Criminal Court. His defence relied on medical evidence presented to show "that it was within the lines of possibility that the deceased mutilated himself". The jury returned a verdict of guilty, but recommended mercy on account of the prisoner's good character. The judge passed a sentence of death, with Hewart's ultimate fate to be decided by the Executive Council of the colonial government. The Executive Council met on 21 August and determined "that the sentence of the law should be taken into effect". After this decision a number of appeals for mercy were submitted to the government, including a petition from nine of the jurors from Hewart's trial. On 8 September the New South Wales Premier, Sir Henry Parkes, sent a telegram to the Governor, Lord Carington, on a visit to Broken Hill, asking whether he had any intention of exercising the Royal prerogative. Carington's response was: "The law must take its course".

Robert Hewart was executed at Darlinghurst Gaol on the morning of 11 September 1888. At about eleven minutes past nine o'clock, Howard pulled the white cap over the prisoner's head and neck and adjusted the rope. The executioner then motioned to his assistant, "who was a new hand", to release the trap-door. The assistant was "evidently nervous" and briefly hesitated. Howard, showing signs of impatience, "leaned forward to kick the lever with his foot" at the same moment that the assistant released the bolt. The prisoner dropped nine feet; "death was instantaneous" after his neck was broken.

In January 1889 Howard supervised the execution of Louisa Collins at Darlinghurst Gaol, the last woman to be judicially hanged in New South Wales. Collins was arrested in July 1888 after her second husband, Michael Collins, died in the Sydney suburb of Botany from what was later determined to be arsenic poisoning. Suspicion was aroused when doctors attending the patient realised that the man's symptoms and manner of death was similar to that of Louisa's first husband, Charles Andrews, who had died in February 1887. Two separate coronial inquests, into Michael Collins' death and the exhumed remains of Charles Andrews, revealed that both men had died from arsenic poisoning administered in small doses over a period prior to their deaths. Louisa Collins was arrested and faced four separate trials, three for the murder of Michael Collins and one for Andrews' murder. The juries in the first three trials were unable to agree upon a verdict, but at the fourth trial in December 1888, for her second husband's murder, the jury delivered a guilty verdict and Louisa was sentenced to death.

After extensive newspaper coverage of the case over a six-month period, there was widespread public debate regarding the death sentence imposed on Louisa Collins, with arguments both for and against a reprieve. A number of petitions calling for mercy were sent to the New South Wales Governor, but by the eve of the execution date both the colonial Government and the Governor had decided not to interfere with the sentence of the Court. Louisa Collins was executed on the morning of 8 January 1889, upon the gallows within Darlinghurst Gaol. After a short prayer from the chaplain, Howard placed the white cap over Collins' head and the rope was tightened around her neck. The executioner then signalled to his assistant to pull the lever to release the trapdoor, but the handle could not be moved. On investigation it was found that the pin holding the handle in place "was fast in its slot". Howard's assistant then tried to remove the pin but a number of blows with a mallet were required before it gave way. While this was happening, Collins stood on the scaffold "perfectly upright and motionless". When the pin was removed, the lever was pulled and the trapdoor opened. The condemned woman's body "fell through in a slightly curved position". After initially swinging to one side the body hung motionless, indicating that death had been instantaneous. Immediately afterwards, however, "a slight spurt of blood" was noticed by the witnesses below, followed by "a thin stream which ran down the dress and spotted the floor beneath". Later examination revealed that the force of the drop had opened the woman's neck and torn her windpipe, with "the head appearing to only hang by the vertebrae of the neck". After hanging for twenty minutes the corpse was lowered onto a wicker bier and conveyed to the inquest room. That afternoon Collins' remains were buried at Rookwood Cemetery under the supervision of police authorities.

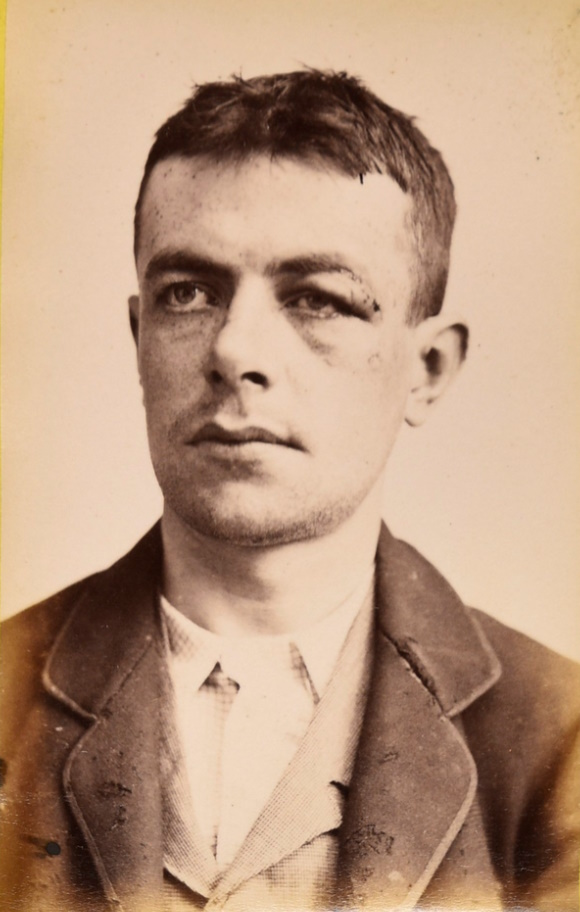
James Morrison, executed at Darlinghurst Gaol in August 1889.

On 20 August 1889 Howard supervised the execution of James Morrison, convicted of the murder of a young policeman, Constable David Sutherland. Morrison was a criminal who had served six separate prison sentences in Melbourne for larceny, receiving stolen goods and being in possession of housebreaking tools. Sutherland apprehended Morrison, who was acting in a suspicious manner in the early hours of 3 June 1889 in Potts Point. A struggle ensued and both men fell, with Sutherland uppermost. Morrison drew a revolver from his pocket and fired twice, with both shots striking the policeman's right groin. During the struggle Sutherland managed to hit his assailant on the forehead with his truncheon, after which Morrison ran off, leaving the policeman gravely wounded. Soon afterwards a blood-stained Morrison was apprehended by two police officers at the top of William Street. Constable Sutherland was taken to hospital where he was able to give a deposition and identify the prisoner before he died of his wounds. Morrison's execution was described by the Evening News journalist as being performed "with more speed than ceremony". Howard placed the noose around the condemned man's neck and tightened the hangman's knot under his left ear. With a motion from the hangman to his assistant "in an instant the trap fell with a whirr and a slight crash, and Morrison was dead".

In November 1889 Howard and his assistant (identified as James Goaler or Golder) travelled to Wagga Wagga for the execution of Thomas Reilly, sentenced to death for the murder of Christian Eppel, the overseer of a group of drovers who had brought a herd of cattle overland from Queensland to Albury on the Murray River. Reilly had joined the drovers at Bourke. After the cattle were sold the droving team returned to Wagga to rest the horses and prepare for the return trip. The drovers camped at Lentin Common near Wagga where Eppel paid off his men. On 15 September 1889 Reilly shot his overseer through the head as he lay in his tent, and stole a purse of money and a watch and chain. After the murder of Eppel, Reilly "became excited, remorseful and reckless"; he tried to escape on horseback but was apprehended soon afterwards. Reilly admitted to the killing and wrote out a full statement, confessing to the crime. At the trial he pleaded guilty, despite being solemnly warned by the judge of the consequences of his plea. Thomas Reilly was executed at Wagga on 6 November 1889. The prisoner's death was "almost instantaneous", with Reilly's neck being broken by the fall. The correspondent for Melbourne's The Argus commented that "Howard, the hangman, performed his work very well". After his execution it was disclosed that Reilly "was a cousin of Ned and Dan Kelly, the bushrangers". Reilly was buried in an unconsecrated section of the Catholic cemetery at Wagga. Howard once disclosed to an official that he preferred to hang Catholics in preference to prisoners of any other denomination, for the reason that "their religion taught them how to die with resignation, and they gave him the least trouble".

==== Executions during the 1890s ====
A year elapsed before Howard's services as colonial executioner were again required. In November 1890 the hangman returned to Wagga Wagga for the execution of Albert Smidt, convicted of the murder in April 1890 of his travelling companion, John Young Taylor. It was strongly believed that Smidt had also murdered Jacob Rick, a travelling companion of both he and Taylor, but the investigation of Rick's disappearance stalled after police failed to locate his body.

Howard and his assistant arrived from Sydney a week before Smidt's execution and were provided with quarters at the gaol, during which time the scaffold was erected within the gaol. In an effort to conceal the structure from the nearby houses, a wide canvas screen was placed around two sides of the gaol walls. Smidt was executed within the walls of the Wagga Gaol on the morning of 18 November 1890. A few minutes before the appointed hour the hangman and his deputy entered the cell, pinioned the prisoner's arms and led him to the scaffold. After the last religious rites were performed by the attending minister of religion, the white cap was pulled over Smidt's face, the rope was placed around his neck and the noose pulled tight. On a signal from the hangman, the bolt was sprung to release the trap. Death appeared to be instantaneous, "for hardly a muscle was seen to quiver after the body fell".

Howard was called upon to supervise three hangings in 1891:

- Lars Peter Hansen was hanged on 2 June 1891 at Dubbo Gaol for the murder of Charles Duncker on the Peak Hill road near Tomingley. The two men, both gold-miners, had camped together while travelling from Peak Hill to Dubbo; after a quarrel Hansen killed Duncker with a tomahawk and attempted to burn his body. After he was charged and found guilty of the murder, Hansen maintained throughout that he killed Duncker in self-defence.
- Maurice Dalton was hanged on 17 November 1891 at Darlinghurst Gaol, convicted of the murder of his wife Catherine. The elderly couple had lived in Foveaux Street, Surry Hills; on 14 April 1891, after a quarrel, Dalton murdered his wife by battering her head with a heavy branding iron. Dalton's execution went badly; after the drop the prisoner's head was "nearly severed from the body, the flesh being torn in a horrible manner". In accordance with the law, the body was left to hang for twenty minutes, with "blood from the broken flesh pouring into the pit beneath".
- Harold Dutton Mallalieu (alias Massey) was executed on 26 November 1891 at Dubbo Gaol for the murder of Jerome Carey. In March 1891 Carey's bones were found amongst the ashes of a smouldering fire beside the Bogan River near Nyngan. Mallalieu, a young man aged nineteen years, was arrested four days later and, while in prison, confessed to the murder.

Howard's services as colonial executioner were only required on one occasion in 1892, for the hanging of Jimmy Tong at Armidale in November of that year. Tong had emigrated from China in the 1850s. In early November 1891 he murdered and robbed his fellow countryman, Harry Hing, at Walcha. Tong was tried twice before the Armidale Circuit Court. The first jury was unable to agree on a verdict "owing to some of the jurymen having feelings averse to capital punishment". At his second trial in October 1892, Jimmy Tong was convicted of the murder and sentenced to death. Howard and his assistant, Jim Gaoler, arrived in Armidale on 25 November 1892 to prepare for the execution. The two men were accommodated in quarters within the Gaol Hospital. The gallows were erected on the western side of the gaol, with the platform only about eight feet above ground level so the structure could not be seen from outside the walls. A hole, eight feet deep, was dug under the trapdoor "to allow the body to fall the required distance". The execution on 29 November went according to plan, with the prisoner's death described as "instantaneous".

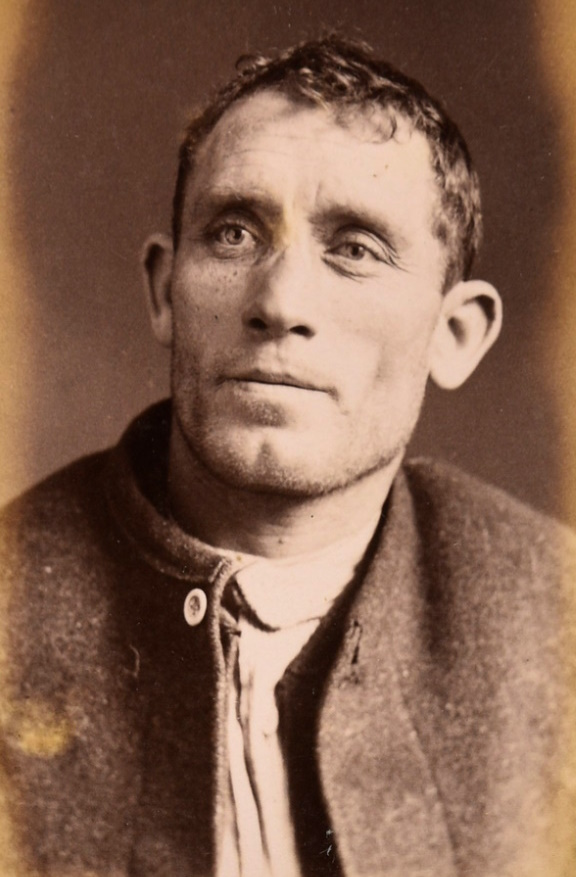
Edward Smedley, executed on 13 June 1893.

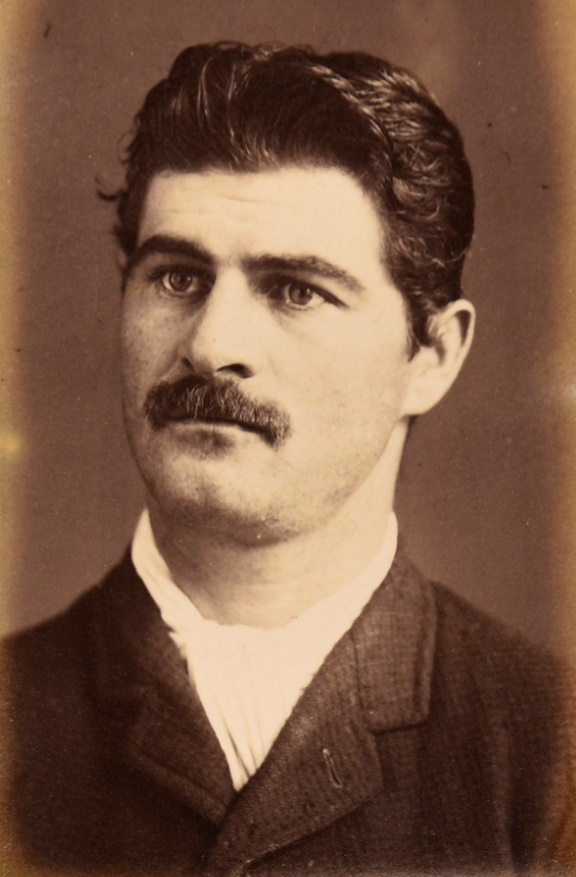
George Archer, executed on 11 July 1893.

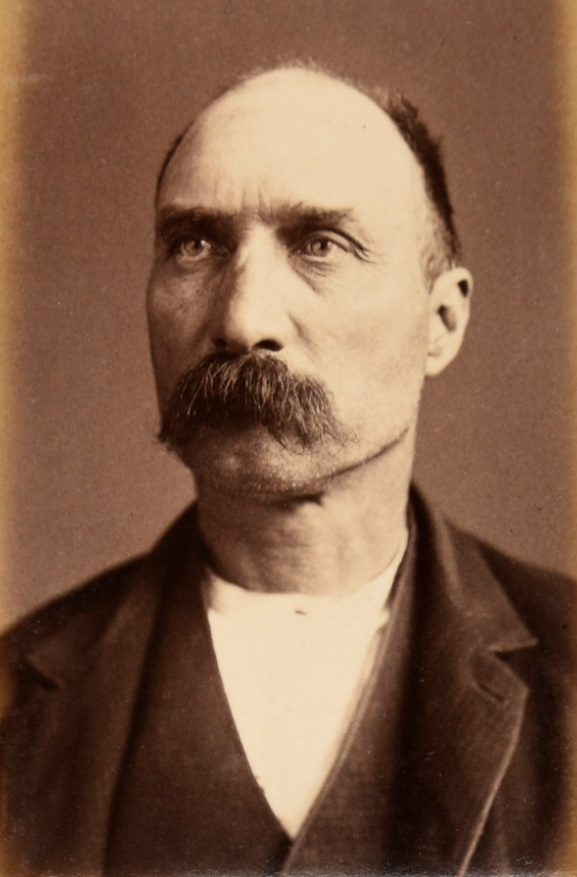
John Makin, executed on 15 August 1893.

Convicted murderers hanged at Darlinghurst Gaol during 1893.

Howard oversaw five executions during 1893, including three within the space of two months at Darlinghurst Gaol.

- Edward Smedley was hanged on 13 June 1893 at Darlinghurst Gaol for the murder of his wife Phoebe at Quirindi. The couple had been both employed at the Volunteer Arms Hotel; in the hotel's kitchen in the early afternoon of 19 February 1893, Smedley stabbed his wife several times in the back with a carving knife. As she ran into the adjoining dining room her husband followed her and fatally cut her throat. He was tried and convicted at Tamworth in April, after which he was sent to Sydney "to have the state of his mind inquired into". The medical examination determined that Smedley was sane and the date of his execution was set. His death did not go as planned; the knot of the rope failed to slip down as the prisoner dropped, and "instead of the neck being broken the windpipe was torn" and Smedley died by suffocation.
- George Archer was executed on 11 July 1893 at Darlinghurst Gaol for the rape and murder of Emma Harrison. The murder occurred in March 1893 at a house in Bourke Street, Darlinghurst, the residence of John Osborne and his wife Annie, with boarders occupying the two upstairs bedrooms, in one room was Archer and his wife and child, and in the other was Emma Harrison, a dressmaker. One evening, when only Archer and Miss Harrison were in the house, Archer went to the dressmaker's bedroom and raped and strangled her. The execution of George Archer did not go well, with the prisoner dying by strangulation. The journalist for The Australian Star described his death in the following terms: "How the wretched creature struggled for breath and freedom was shown in the heaving chest, the fighting limbs, and the smothered screech of agony that continued for fully seven minutes after the bolt had been drawn".
- On 15 August 1893 Howard supervised the execution of John Makin at Darlinghurst. Makin and his wife were notorious 'baby farmers' who had been convicted in March 1893 of the murder of the infant Horace Murray, but were probably responsible for the deaths of a total of fifteen infants. Sarah Makin's death sentence was commuted to a life sentence in April; after an unsuccessful appeal to the Privy Council in London, her husband's execution was carried out at Darlinghurst Goal in August.
- In November 1893 Howard travelled to Mudgee for the hanging of Jimmy Hoy, convicted of the murder of the local shopkeeper, Ah Fook. The two men "had lived together for a long time in a very amicable way", but one evening in July 1893 Hoy murdered Ah Fook with an axe. Jimmy Hoy was executed on 24 November within the walls of Mudgee Gaol.
- After the hanging at Mudgee Howard and his assistant travelled to Bathurst, where five days later they executed Edwin Hubert Glasson. In the days prior to the hanging the two executioners resided in quarters at Bathurst Gaol, during which alterations to the gallows were made as specified by the Under-Sheriff, Cecil Maybury. During the construction of the new gaol at Bathurst, completed in June 1888, gallows wide enough for two simultaneous hangings had been constructed adjacent to two condemned cells. The alterations to the structure, supervised by Howard, were: the cast-iron platform and trapdoor was replaced by a wooden scaffold, the ring to hold the rope was fixed to the centre of the beam, the railings were moved further away from the drop and the well below the trapdoor was deepened by a further three feet. The condemned prisoner, Edwin Glasson, had been convicted of the vicious murders of bank manager John Phillips and Frances Cavanagh, a visitor to the household, during Glasson's aborted attempt to rob the City Bank at Carcoar. He was hanged at Bathurst Gaol on 29 November 1893.

During 1894 Howard supervised executions at Darlinghurst, Tamworth and Bathurst, two of which were double hangings.

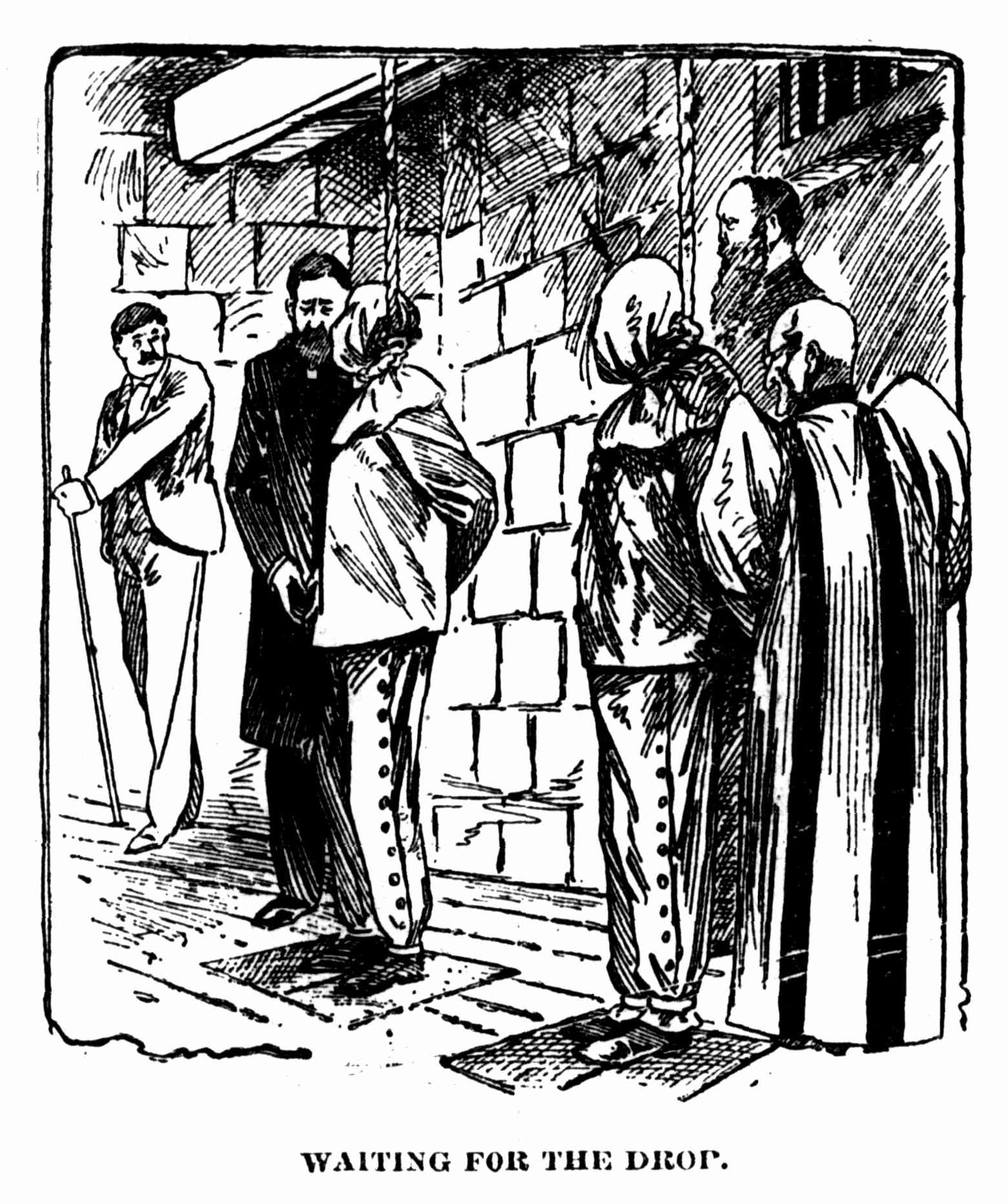
The execution of Williams and Montgomery, published in Bird O'Freedom, 2 June 1894.

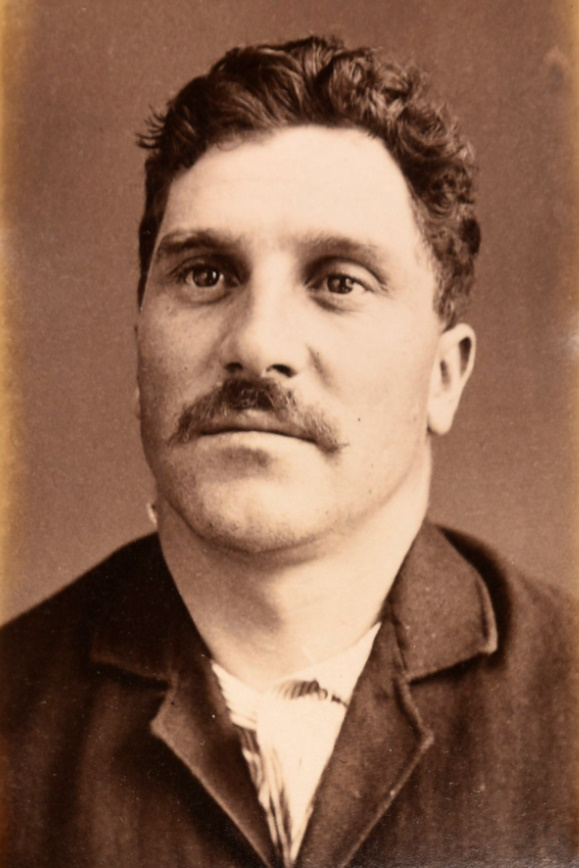
Thomas Williams (alias Thomas Carroll).

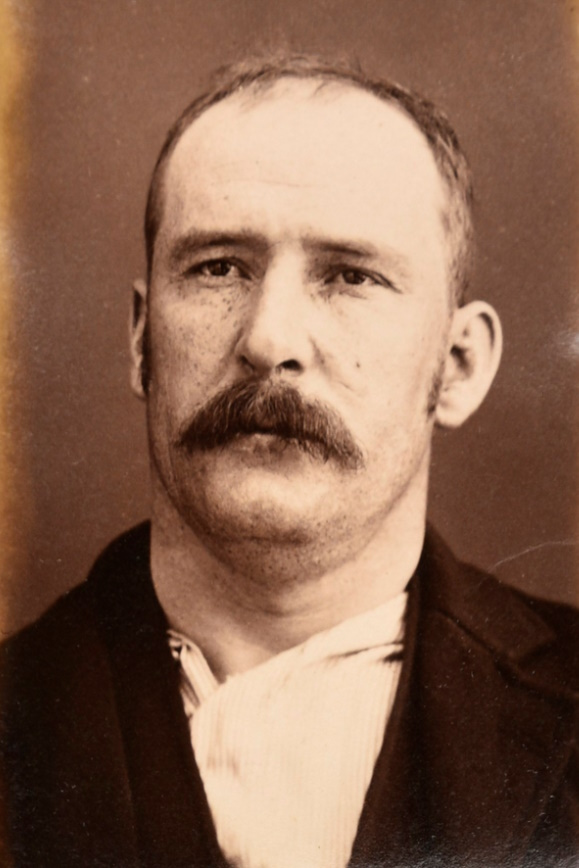
Charles Montgomery (alias Thomas Millidge).

The Bridge Street Burglars, executed at Darlinghurst Gaol on 31 May 1894.
- Two criminals from Melbourne, Charles Montgomery (alias Thomas Millidge) and Thomas Williams (alias Thomas Carroll), were apprehended by police officers after they and a third man had broken into the offices of the Union Steam-ship Company of New Zealand in Bridge Street, Sydney, in the early hours of 2 February 1894. Montgomery and Williams were armed with a revolver and jemmy-bars. During an affray with police in the streets near Circular Quay and ultimate capture of the two criminals, five policemen received serious injuries. Of the five, Constable Frederick Bowden was knocked unconscious from a blow with a jemmy-bar and suffered a fractured skull. In early April Montgomery and Williams were convicted of "feloniously wounding" Constable Bowden, "with intent to murder him", and both men were sentenced to death. Montgomery and Williams were executed side-by-side from the scaffold at Darlinghurst Gaol on 31 May 1894. Montgomery's death was instantaneous, but Williams died from suffocation after the rope was initially caught under his arm during the drop. The report of the hangings in The Daily Telegraph asserted that Howard had "misplaced the men". Montgomery was taller and heavier than Williams, so a drop of nine feet had been planned for Williams and a lesser drop of seven feet for Montgomery. It was claimed that "Howard had evidently forgotten the position he had previously assigned to the men, and in his desire to be expeditious, blundered". Howard's assistant on this occasion was a man named Goldrick.
- John Cummins and Alec Lee (alias Joseph Anderson) were convicted of the murder of William Mackay, the manager of the Commercial Bank at Barraba, during an attempt to rob the bank in April 1894. In early July 1894 the Executive Council met and determined that Lee and Cummins would be executed in Tamworth Gaol on 20 July. In the early hours before he was to hang, Cummins attempted to take his own life by opening an artery in his arm with a small blade, kept hidden since his trial. He was discovered by a warder and given medical attention. Cummins was in a weakened state by daybreak. He was supported by Howard and a prison-warder as he mounted the steps of the scaffold and was seated and strapped to a chair above the trap-door, with Lee standing beside him. After the drop "there was not the movement of a muscle, and a moment afterwards both bodies were hanging perfectly motionless", with one report stating: "The arrangements could not have been conducted more satisfactorily".
- At about midnight on 6 May 1894, Frederick Dennis (alias Frederick Paton) was discovered on the premises of Medcalf's store at Fifield, a mining community north of Condobolin. Dennis shot at John Hall with a revolver, one of a group of men who had entered the store to search for the intruder, before making his escape. Hall was fatally wounded in the chest from the encounter and died several days later, leaving a widow and seven children. Dennis was captured and convicted of murder at the Bathurst Circuit Court in October 1894. He was hanged at Bathurst Gaol on 11 December 1894. Howard's assistant on this occasion was Samuel Godkin, who continued in that role until Howard's retirement in 1904.

Howard's services as colonial executioner was only required on one occasion in 1895. In the early hours of 15 October 1894 a watchman named Thomas Heavey had tried to apprehend a suspected burglar named Alfred Grenon (alias Leporte and Michell) in Elizabeth Bay Road in Sydney's eastern suburbs. After a struggle Grenon shot Heavey in the chest and escaped, but was apprehended soon afterwards by a policeman. Grenon was charged with shooting Heavey "with intent to murder him". He was tried in December 1894, found guilty and sentenced to death. Grenon was executed on 7 February 1895 at Darlinghurst Gaol, supervised by Howard and his assistant. The condemned man was fitted with a "hobble strap... made fast to each ankle", an innovation introduced by Howard which allowed the prisoner to walk but would prevent the legs from swinging during the drop. This method of fastening the legs was introduced after the execution of Thomas Williams in May 1894, whose fall had been broken by the swinging of his legs, resulting in death by suffocation. Alfred Glenon's death in February 1895 was described as "instantaneous".

Eleven months elapsed before Howard's next execution, when he hanged Thomas Meredith Sheridan at Darlinghurst in January 1896 for a crime described as "technical murder", a killing "without premeditation or malice", the first person to be hanged in New South Wales for such a crime. On 1 September 1895 the mutilated body of 23-year-old Jessie Nicholls was found within a packing crate near the water's edge at Wooloomooloo Bay. An autopsy and subsequent investigations by detectives revealed that the young woman had died after an illegal abortion performed by Sheridan. He was tried in November 1895, found guilty of murder and sentenced to death. Sheridan had been convicted of performing illegal abortions on two previous occasions, in each case resulting in the deaths of the women. Despite prison sentences totalling fifteen years, he had been released in October 1894 after serving a little over seven years. Sheridan was executed on 7 January 1896 at Darlinghurst Gaol, in a hanging that went to plan. His death was reported to have been "instantaneous", with "no perceptible twitching movement of his body after the bolt was drawn".

Howard supervised three hangings in 1897, all performed within a two-month period:

- In late March 1897 the widower Charles Hines was tried on the charge of raping of his step-daughter, Mary Emily Hayne, at Ellerston (north-east of Scone in the Hunter Valley). The rapes had been perpetrated at various times between 1891 and 1896, beginning when Mary was aged thirteen years. Hines was convicted and sentenced to death. The sentence was carried out by Howard and his assistant at Maitland Gaol on 21 May 1897. Hines died "firmly and instantaneously", with the prisoner's neck broken in two places after the drop.

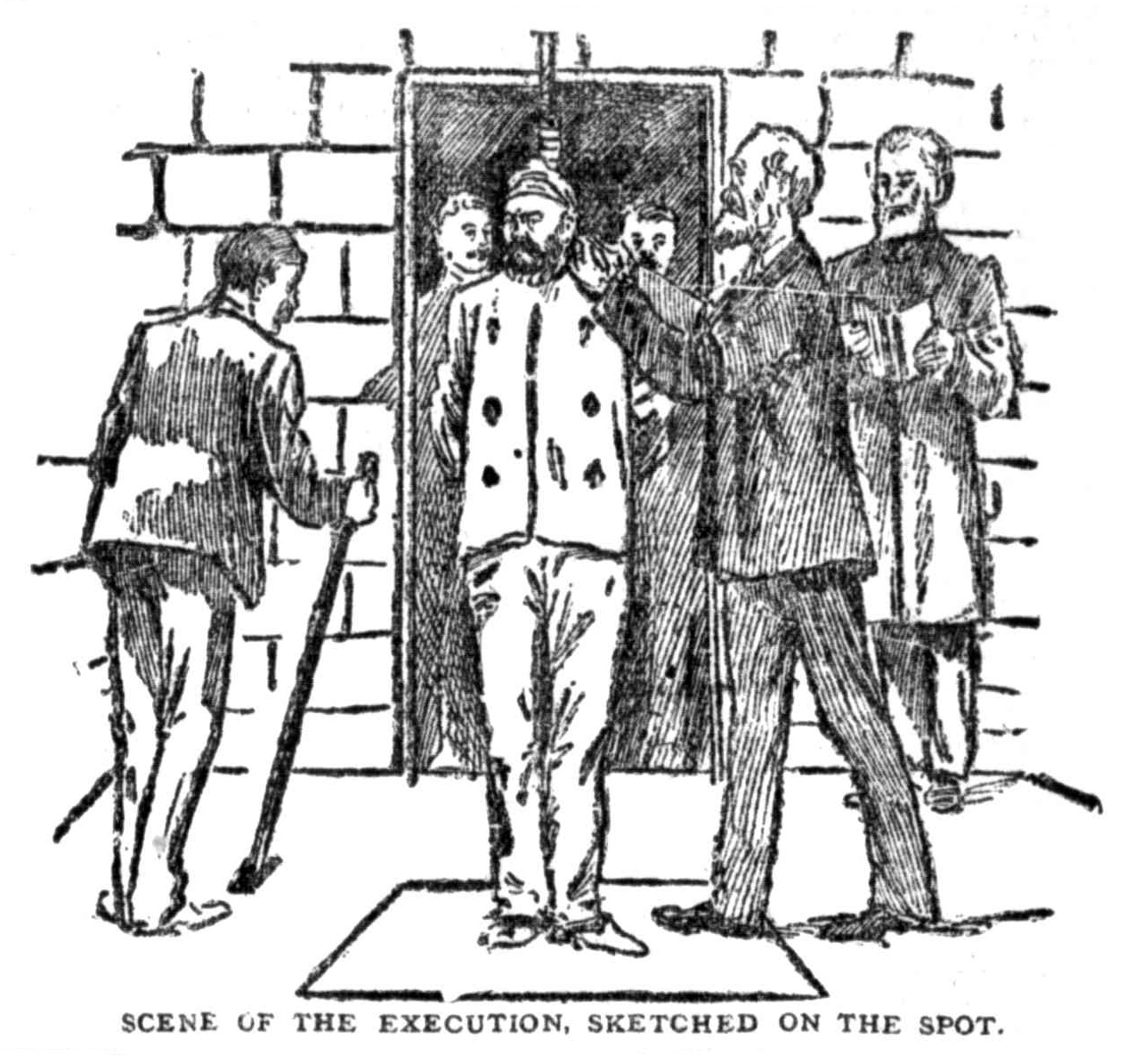
The execution of Frank Butler at Darlinghurst Gaol in July 1897.

- Thomas Moore was convicted at in the Dubbo Circuit Court in April 1897 of the murder of a fisherman named Edward Smith, at Brennan's Bend on the Darling River near Bourke, on 3 November 1896. The execution of Moore on 24 June 1897 at Dubbo Gaol did not go well, with the prisoner being decapitated by the fall. The report of the hanging in the local newspaper described the "sickening sight" in the pit below the trapdoor: "The trunk was all of a heap on one side, the head completely severed from the body, with the face visible a yard away, and the whitewashed sides splashed with the blood of Moore". The report added "no blame can be attached to any one"; the drop had been calculated in accordance with the prisoner's weight and height, "but evidently allowance was not made for the fact that the condemned man was fat and flabby, and the bones of his neck thin and brittle".
- On 16 July 1897 Howard executed the notorious serial-killer, Frank Butler (born Richard Ashe), at Darlinghurst Gaol. After he had been extradited from the United States, Butler was convicted in June 1897 of the murder of Captain Lee Weller at Glenbrook, in the Blue Mountains near Sydney. After he was sentenced to death, Butler confessed to Weller's murder, as well as the murders of Charles Burgess and Arthur Preston.

After Butler's hanging in July 1897, seventeen months elapsed before Howard's services as colonial executioner were again required in New South Wales. In December 1898 the hangman and his assistant travelled to Dubbo for the execution of Wong Ming. The condemned man had been tried at the Dubbo Circuit Court in October 1898 and convicted of the murder of Joe Mong Jong at the Chinese camp at Warren, New South Wales. The series of events that led to the murder in August 1898 began when Wong Ming stabbed Alice Spong about the breast and arm. Joe Mong Jong attempted to intervene during the assault when Wong Ming turned on him; he was chased down the street and fatally stabbed with a hunting knife. After Alice Spong escaped to a neighbouring house, Wong Ming attempted suicide by stabbing himself twice in the abdomen, but he was apprehended by the police and taken to the local hospital. Wong Ming was hanged at Dubbo Gaol on 13 December 1898.

In April 1899 Howard supervised the execution of Stuart Briggs at Darlinghurst Gaol. Briggs had been convicted of the murders of Margaret Dutt and her grandmother, Margaret Millar, at their home in Douglas Street in Petersham. Briggs had gone to the house in December 1898 armed with a revolver, in an attempt actuated by jealousy to secure Dutt's affection. After his efforts was rejected, Briggs fatally shot 'Maggie' Dutt and her grandmother. Briggs was tried in February 1899, pleading not guilty due to insanity, but he was convicted and sentenced to death. The condemned man was executed on 5 April 1899; his death was reported to have been "practically instantaneous".

==== Last years of a career ====
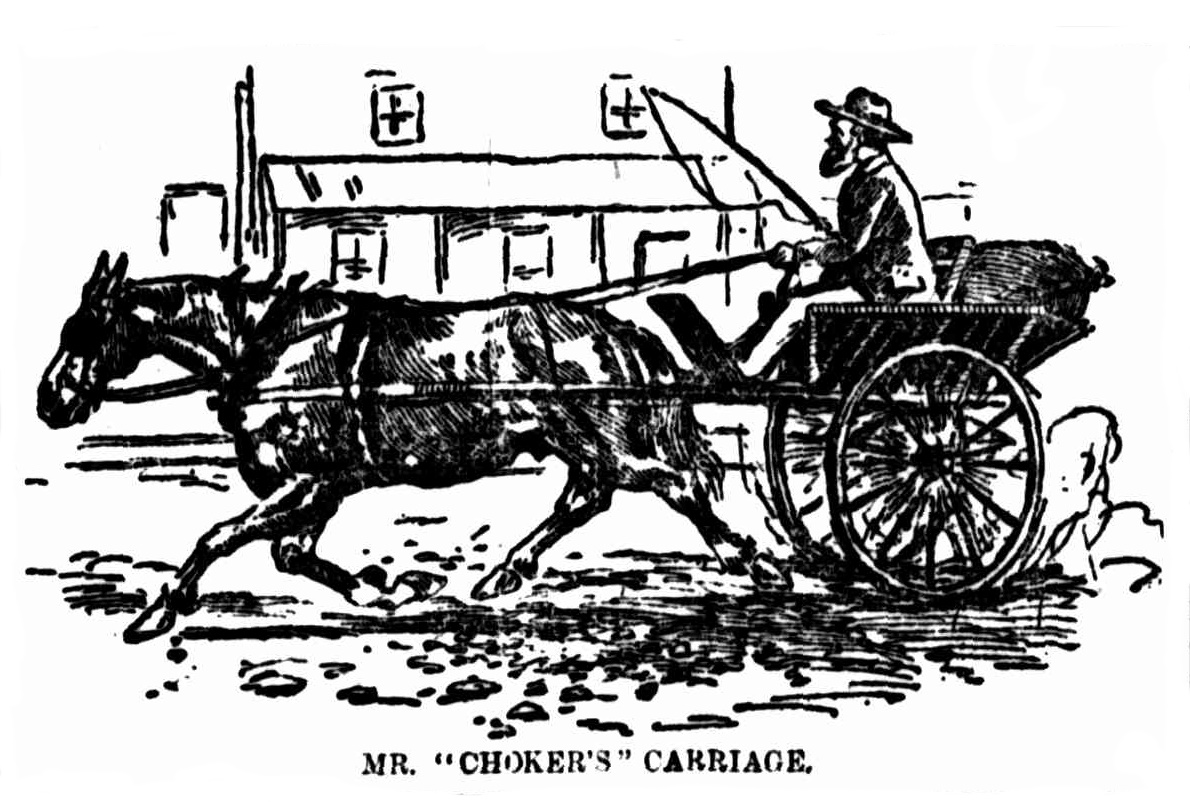
An illustration of Howard driving his horse-drawn cart, published in Truth newspaper, 20 January 1901.

Towards the end of his career as executioner, Howard was a well-known and easily recognised resident of Sydney. In his private life, Howard was "said to be a very decent fellow, an orderly citizen, and extremely charitable" and was reputed to "have a quite respectable bank balance". He kept a horse at his Bondi cottage, which was used for drawing a trap in which Howard routinely rode from his home "across the sandhills" to the tram stop, or "drives into town when occasion requires". After its owner dismounted at the tram stop the animal was trained to return home. Howard had purchased the horse from the Wollahra pound for five shillings, in a starving condition and "wild as a dingo". It was claimed that Howard trained his horse to fetch beer from the Cliff House Hotel at Bondi. The horse carried a pannikin strapped to the saddle, with money inside, and returned after the publican filled the container with beer. During his leisure hours Howard engaged in fishing for sharks, occasionally using his horse to assist in dragging a particularly large one from the water. He had a collection of shark skeletons, including jaws and teeth, adorning his garden at Bondi. Howard was particularly proud of his flower garden and kept bees at his cottage. During work-days Howard was seen to frequently drink in public-houses near the Court-house at Darlinghurst and others near the Supreme Court.

In December 1900 Howard and his assistant travelled to Goulburn to carry out the execution of the convicted murderer, John Sleigh. The condemned man had a long history of criminal activities and incarceration. Sleigh had been released from prison on probation in 1900 and went to live at the house of Michael Woolfe, a settler at Back Creek near Bombala. Sleigh was a nephew of Woolfe's wife. Another member of the household was Frank Curran (known as 'Bones'), who was Woolfe's step-brother. One day in August 1900 Sleigh arrived at the house in an agitated state and told Mrs. Woolfe he had shot Curran. With her husband away in Bombala, that night Mrs. Woolfe sent her son to inform him and the local police. Sleigh left the house the following morning. When the police arrived later that day they found Curran's partially burnt body in a paddock. Sleight was captured soon afterwards and was tried and convicted of the murder at the Goulburn Assizes in October. John Sleigh was executed at Goulburn Gaol on 5 December 1900. Howard brought all his experience and skill to the task, resulting in a hanging that prompted a local newspaper to make the following comment: "There can be no doubt that Howard carried out his unenviable task with great precision and success".

In January 1901 Howard and his assistant travelled to Dubbo to carry out the execution of Jacky Underwood, an Aboriginal man who had participated with Jimmy Governor in the murder of four members of the Mawbey family and a schoolteacher named Ellen Kerz at Breelong in the Gilgandra district in July 1900. Underwood was captured four days after the murders; he was tried at Dubbo and convicted of the murder of 14-year-old Percy Mawbey. The condemned man was held at Dubbo Gaol, under sentence of death, during the manhunt for his accomplice, Jimmy Governor. Underwood was hanged on 14 January 1901. His death was "instantaneous"; "from the official point of view, the execution was highly successful".

After Underwood's execution Howard and his assistant immediately returned to Sydney to supervise the hanging of Jimmy Governor, which was carried out four days later. After the murders at Breelong, Governor and his brother Joe were on the run from police for fourteen weeks, during which time the brothers committed further murders and multiple robberies. Jimmy Governor had been captured on 27 October 1900 near Bobin in the Mid North Coast region, after being wounded in the mouth two weeks earlier. Joe Governor was shot and killed on Talbrook Creek three days later. Jimmy Governor was brought to Sydney and tried in November 1900, charged with the murder of Ellen Kerz. He was convicted and sentenced to death. Governor was hanged on the morning of 18 January 1901 at Darlinghurst Gaol.

On 20 December 1901 Howard supervised the execution of Joseph Campbell at Darlinghurst Gaol. Campbell had been sentenced to death at the Central Criminal Court in Sydney in November 1901, convicted of the rape of a nine-year-old girl, Violet Oldfield, near Queanbeyan.

In 1903 Howard carried out his final hangings as executioner for New South Wales, three in number, one of which was a double hanging:

- On 23 December 1902 an itinerant Aborigine named 'Tommy' Moore assaulted ten-year-old Janey Smith in an area of "unoccupied scrubland" known as Ramsay's Bush in the Borough of Ashfield (modern Haberfield), leaving the young girl fatally injured with her head battered by a large stone. Moore was tried and convicted in February 1903. He was executed at Darlinghurst Gaol on 14 April 1903.
- Howard's final task as executioner was the double hanging of Digby Grand (alias Henry Newbold) and Henry Jones (alias James Maguire), convicted of the murder of a policeman. Constable Samuel Long was investigating a possible burglary in the early hours of 19 January 1903 when he was shot in the head at the Royal Hotel in Auburn. After a reward of £200 was offered for information about the murder, a tip-off led to the arrest of Grand and, at a later date, Jones. After a couple of delays the pair were put on trial for Constable Long's murder in April 1903, but after erratic testimony by the main witness for the prosecution, the trial was abandoned. A second trial commenced on 11 May, at which the jury returned a guilty verdict, with a recommendation to mercy because of the uncertainty as to who had fired the fatal shot. After an unsuccessful appeal, the Executive Council rejected the plea for mercy, determining that both convicted men were equally culpable. Grand and Jones were executed side-by-side on 7 July 1903 at Darlinghurst Gaol. Jones' death was "instantaneous", caused by "dislocation of the cervical vertebrae", but Grand was observed convulsively struggling for several minutes after the drop. The post-mortem revealed Grand died by strangulation.

=== Career record ===
In a career spanning twenty-eight years Robert Howard had been involved in the executions of sixty-two persons, fifty-nine of them under his direct supervision as the principal executioner. He was the longest-serving of any New South Wales executioner.

Throughout Howard's career journalists were allowed to attend executions in New South Wales, so newspaper accounts of hangings included descriptions of the manner in which the condemned person died. A successful execution, usually describing the death as "instantaneous", was considered to be one involving dislocation or fracturing of the vertebrae in which there was very little or no movement of the body after the drop. For the hangman, a successful execution culminated in the fracture of the second cervical vertebra, nowadays known as the 'hangman's fracture'. Rather than an instant death, such an execution resulted in a rapid loss of consciousness, with death occurring from the subsequent "compression of the vertebral and carotoid arteries leading to cerebral ischaemia". Any execution involving an open wound, such as a partial or complete decapitation, although distasteful for the witnesses, was still considered to have been a quick death. An unsuccessful or bungled hanging culminated in the condemned person dying from asphyxiation, being strangled with their arms pinioned at the end of the rope, a process that could be both painful and prolonged.

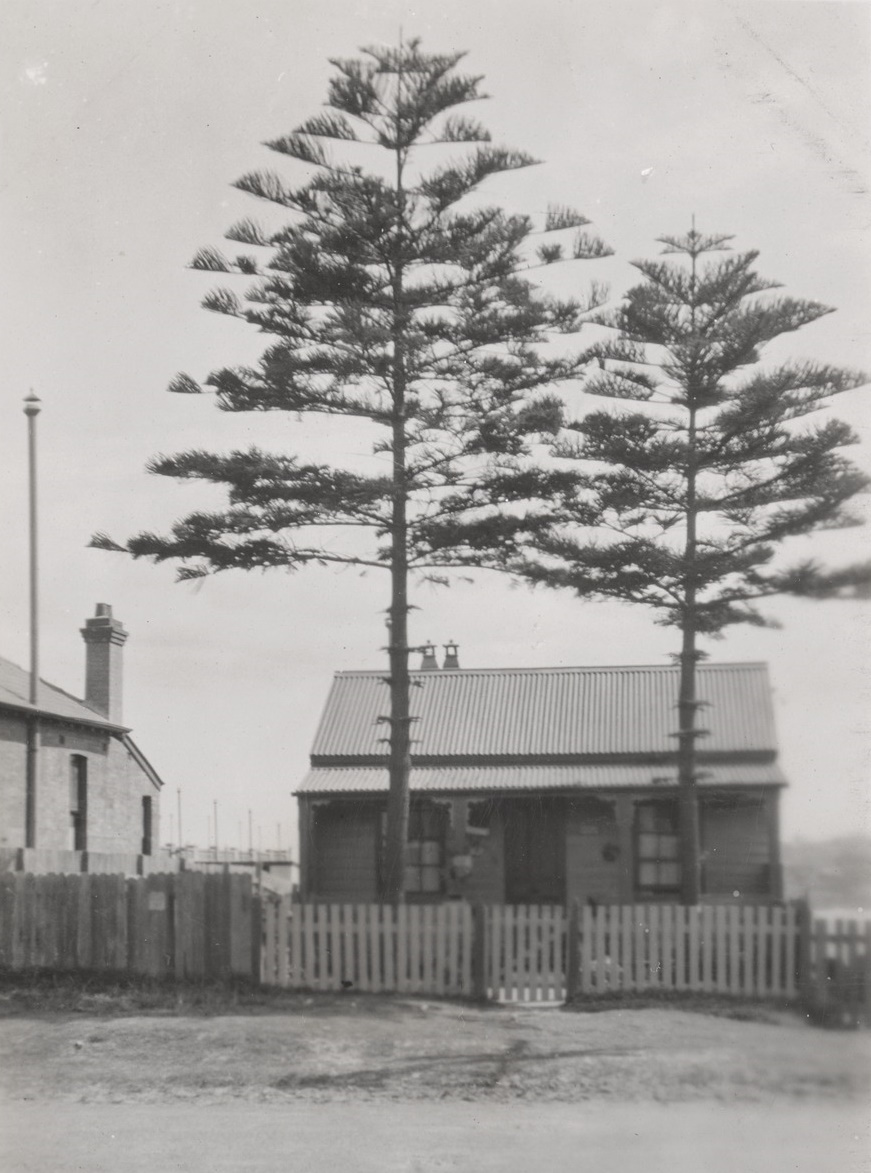
The cottage at North Bondi where Howard lived from about 1887 until his death in February 1906.

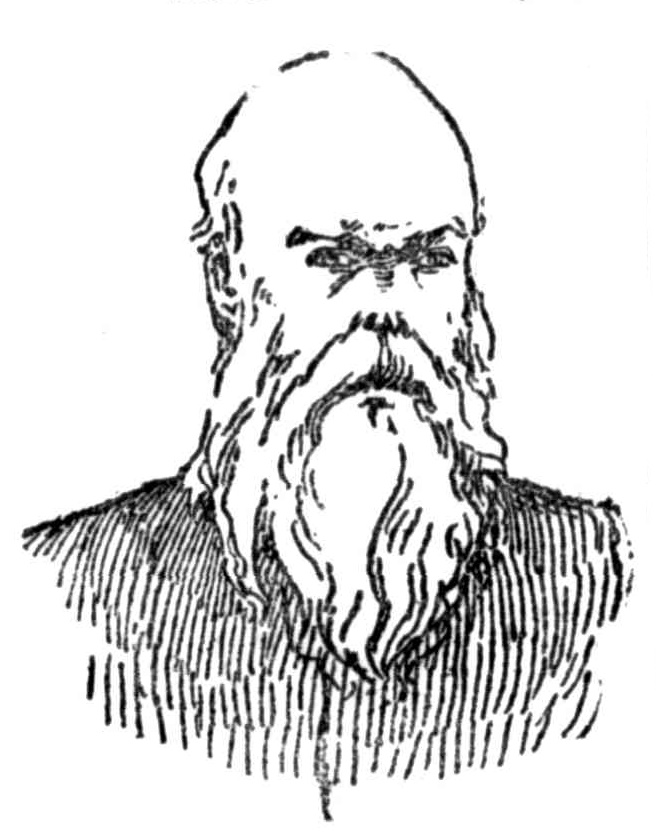
Robert 'Nosey Bob' Howard, illustration published in Truth newspaper, 18 July 1897.

Rachel Franks, in her biography of Howard, published a table of the sixty-two executions carried out by the hangman during his career (including three as assistant hangman). For each case the list includes the length of the drop (where known) and a short description of the manner of death. Of the sixty-two executions, twelve (or 19 percent) were considered to have been bungled, with the prisoner dying from strangulation. Of the remaining fifty executions (81 percent), forty-six resulted in an "instant" death, three involved a partial decapitation and in one case there was a complete decapitation.

=== Retirement ===
Howard retired on a pension in May 1904 when "his advancing years made it necessary for the Government to retire him". After his retirement, Howard's assistant, George Russell, was appointed as the executioner of the State of New South Wales in June 1904. Russell's first duty in this role was the execution of Ah Chick at Dubbo on 28 June 1904, who had been convicted of the murder of his employer, William Tregaskis.

Howard's son Sidney lived with his wife and family next door to his father at North Bondi.

Robert Howard died on 3 February 1906 in his home at North Bondi, aged about 74 years. Howard had been "ailing for some weeks" before his death. His death was attributed to endocarditis and "senile decay". He was buried with his wife Jane and daughter Emily in the Anglican section of Waverley Cemetery.

In his will Howard left to his three sons, Edward, Sidney and William, a block each of three adjoining blocks of land in Brighton Boulevard, North Bondi. To his two surviving daughters, Mary and Fanny, he left blocks of land in Florence Street at Richmond. Any monies held when he died were to be evenly distributed to his five children. To his son Sidney, who had been his primary carer, Howard bequeathed his personal effects, including "clothing, watch and chain and jewellery, furniture, horse or horses, harness or harnesses, vehicle or vehicles, dogs and poultry".
