= The Cobar Herald =

Broadsheet Newspaper

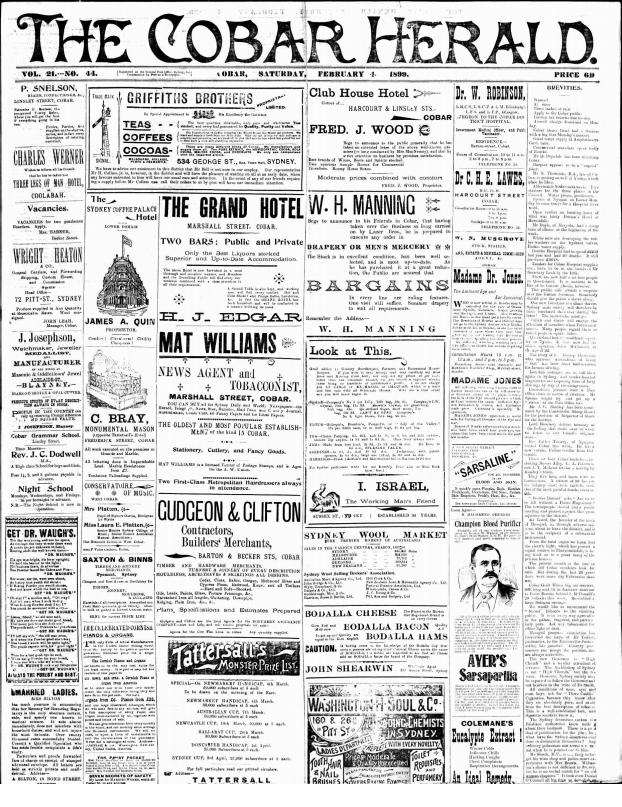
The Cobar Herald, 4 February 1899

The Cobar Herald was an English language, broadsheet newspaper published in Cobar, New South Wales from 1879 to 1914. It was later merged with the Western Age, which merged with Dubbo Dispatch & Wellington Independent to form the Dispatch, afterwards reverting to the Western Age and later the Cobar Age.

== History ==
The Cobar Herald was established in 1879 by T. A. Mathews (better known as the ‘King of Louth’). It is one of the earlier newspapers in the colony of New South Wales, commencing publication in 1879, twenty two years before the Federation of Australia. The Cobar Herald changed hands a number of times over the years, and was owned by Hannay and Munro in the 1890s, with both acting as the newspaper’s editors during that time. By the late 1920s the newspaper was known as the Western Age, and George Cornelius Maliphant and Sidney Frank Anderson owned and published the paper.

The Western Age continued until 1963 when the name was changed to The Cobar Age. The last edition of The Cobar Age was published on 7 November 2012.

== Digitisation ==
Some issues of the paper have been digitised as part of the Australian Newspapers Digitisation Program of the National Library of Australia.

== See also ==
- List of newspapers in Australia
- List of newspapers in New South Wales
