= Dubbo Dispatch =

The Dubbo Dispatch was a newspaper published in Dubbo, New South Wales, Australia from 1865 until 1971. It has also been published as the Dispatch and the Dubbo Dispatch and Wellington Independent.

== History ==
The Dubbo Dispatch and Wellington Independent was first published in 1865 by Thomas Martin Manning in the Furney building in Dubbo. The newspaper would remain in the Manning family until 1920.

In 1932, the newspaper briefly merged with the Western Age to form the Dispatch. However, in 1933 the two newspapers split into the Western Age and the Dubbo Dispatch. The Dubbo Dispatch would continue to be published until 1971 when it was acquired by The Daily Liberal.

== Digitisation ==
The paper has been digitised as part of the Australian Newspapers Digitisation Program project of the National Library of Australia.

== See also ==
- List of newspapers in Australia
- List of newspapers in New South Wales
