= List of Geordie Shore episodes =

The following is a list of episodes for the British television programme, Geordie Shore, which first aired on MTV on 24 May 2011.

== Series overview ==
Series	Episodes	Originally released	
Series	Episodes	First released	Last released
1	6	24 May 2011	28 June 2011
2	8	31 January 2012	20 March 2012
3	8	26 June 2012	14 August 2012
4	8	6 November 2012	18 December 2012
5	8	19 February 2013	9 April 2013
6	8	9 July 2013	27 August 2013
7	6	17 September 2013	22 October 2013
8	8	22 July 2014	9 September 2014
9	8	28 October 2014	16 December 2014
10	8	7 April 2015	26 May 2015
11	10	20 October 2015	22 December 2015
12	8	15 March 2016	3 May 2016
13	6	10 May 2016	14 June 2016
14	10	25 October 2016	20 December 2016
15	12	28 March 2017	13 June 2017
16	9	29 August 2017	17 October 2017
17	10	9 January 2018	13 March 2018
18	12	15 May 2018	31 July 2018
19	10	16 October 2018	18 December 2018
20	10	9 April 2019	11 June 2019
21	10	29 October 2019	24 December 2019
22	8	28 July 2020	15 September 2020
23	10	5 October 2021	7 December 2021
24	10	20 September 2022	22 November 2022
25	10	9 January 2024	5 March 2024
26	10	7 January 2025	4 March 2025
27	10	13 January 2026	17 March 2026

== Episodes ==
=== Series 1 (2011) ===
No. overall	No. in season	Title	Original release date	Viewers (millions)
1	1	"Warm Welcome Home"	24 May 2011	0.635
Everyone arrives in the house but Charlotte and Sophie immediately make a bad impression on the others after getting too drunk. Holly causes a stir in the group when she announces she's got a boyfriend, however she ends up in bed with Gaz. Greg considers leaving as he begins to feel left out when he realises he has nothing in common with the other boys. Gaz tries his luck with Charlotte on a night out and she eventually gives into temptation, going back to the house with him. Jay and Vicky get close, and Holly feels like an outsider.
2	2	"A Romantic Meal"	31 May 2011	0.578
Anna's not happy with Jay and James when they fail to turn up to work, and she considers throwing them out of the house. Holly claims she doesn't remember what happened between her and Gaz but confesses to her boyfriend that something may have happened. The boys go behind the girl's back and bring back girls from the previous night which causes a divide in the house. Charlotte begins to fall for Gaz after she sees him with another girl, and Jay and Vicky fall out after seeing each other flirt with other people.
3	3	"Hello Holly's Boyfriend"	7 June 2011	0.650
Charlotte finally gives into temptation and has sex with Gaz, and Vicky and Jay call a truce. Holly gets a shock when her boyfriend turns up, and Gaz is worried in case it causes arguments between them. Vicky accuses Jay of trying to get with another girl but gets the wrong idea, making him kick off in the middle of a club. As they call a truce again, Vicky admits she doesn't want to lead him on. Holly continues to feel left out in the group and makes the decision to leave the house without telling the others.
4	4	"Where Is Holly?"	14 June 2011	0.610
Charlotte gets emotional when she realises that Holly's gone. More arguments between Jay and Vicky give the group something to talk about, and Vicky tries to prove a point to the boys by arranging a treble blind date. After an unsuccessful date, Vicky bitches about the boys in the house to Charlotte and Sophie, but they go straight to Greg and repeat what was said. As Greg then tells the boys, it causes huge conflict and Vicky considers going home. She then turns to Jay for support.
5	5	"Vicky's Not Happy"	21 June 2011	0.691
Vicky considers leaving the house, but when Sophie resolves the current issues, she decides to stay. Greg isn't happy with Vicky's ongoing behaviour and confronts her about it causing them to clash. Charlotte promises to ignore Gaz but can't stay away, and even nurses him when he's ill and unable to go on a night out. Holly returns and doesn't get the response she was expecting, and after numerous arguments with her boyfriend, she confesses being in bed with Gaz on the first night then tells her boyfriend to end the relationship.
6	6	"It's Getting Complicated Vicky"	28 June 2011	0.634
The Jay and Vicky drama continues. An argument between Greg and Holly gets out of control and Holly begins to trash the house before announcing she's leaving again. With her bags packed and ready to go, Jay throws some home truths her way leaving Vicky shocked. Vicky then spits in Jay's face during another argument causing a girl/boy divide again. Charlotte confesses her feelings towards Gaz but is heartbroken when he brings a girl home and into the bed next to her. The group say an emotional goodbye to each other before heading home.

=== Magaluf Specials ===
No. overall	No. in season	Title	Original release date	Viewers (millions)
–	1	"Magaluf Madness: Part 1"	23 August 2011	0.464
As Geordie Shore arrives in Magaluf, they're hit with the news that one person must look after the villa at all times. Holly admits that she used to have feelings for James, whilst Charlotte refuses to admit that Gaz pulling other girls bothers her, and Vicky shocks everyone with her new calm attitude. The girls lie about house sitting and go for a night out, and the boys soon discover their deception causing a huge divide in the house. Charlotte's upset when Gaz calls her ugly during a heated argument.
–	2	"Magaluf Madness: Part 2"	30 August 2011	0.490
Charlotte ends up in bed with Gaz again and immediately realises her mistake and Vicky's there to pick up the pieces as she gets emotional over him. James is put in an awkward situation when he's forced to choose between two girls, but ends up getting neither of them. Charlotte finally stands up to Gaz as the pair get involved in another brutal argument, but then as everyone's packing their bags and get ready to return to Newcastle, he admits he has feelings for her.

=== Series 2 (2012) ===
No. overall	No. in season	Title	Original release date	Viewers (millions)
7	1	"New Additions"	31 January 2012	0.499
The cast return to the house again and Charlotte promises to stay away from Gaz for good, meanwhile Sophie and Vicky announce they have boyfriends outside of the house. The celebrations are soon interrupted as Rebecca and Ricci arrive in the house. Vicky and Rebecca immediately clash. Charlotte can't help herself and ends up with Gaz, then isn't surprised when he's with another girl the next night. Jay and Rebecca start to get close, Vicky feels guilty for cuddling with Ricci, and Holly tries her luck with James.
8	2	"You Can't Help Your Feelings"	7 February 2012	0.576
Vicky's still torn between Ricci and her boyfriend, Dan. Rebecca's jealous when Jay gets involved with his ex-girlfriend, Amanda. Charlotte admits she's had enough of being hurt by Gaz so packs her bags and leaves the house, and the girls don't take the news well. Holly's still on a mission to get James into bed but he's having none of it. Jay finds Rebecca on Gaz's bed and accuses them of getting together, the argument soon turns to a fight and Sophie's there to break it up.
9	3	"James Needs to Score"	14 February 2012	0.538
Following arguments with Gaz and Holly, Vicky finally realises that she's hurting Dan by getting close to Ricci. Things get worse however when Dan arrives at the house and gets pally with Ricci. Holly's depressed when Rebecca sets James up with one of her friends and they end up spending the night together. Jay loses his temper with Rebecca when she refuses to have sex with him, and a drunk Ricci angers her by calling her unnecessary names. Sophie's not impressed when her boyfriend doesn't make an effort.
10	4	"We Miss You Charlotte"	21 February 2012	0.596
Vicky attempts to end the relationship with Dan but is surprised when he fights for her, then returns to the house to tell Ricci that they're still together. Gaz brings Charlotte back to the house and even suggests starting a relationship. Charlotte gives into temptation again and ends up having sex with him 3 nights in a row. Holly finally gets what she wants and has sex with James, but is upset when he forces Rebecca to swap rooms with him the next day. Jay's not happy with Rebecca as she still refuses to have sex with him.
11	5	"The Party Is Ruined"	28 February 2012	0.652
Sophie's boyfriend, Joel arrives to see her but makes more of an effort to be around the boys and flirt with other girls than be with Sophie. Finally giving up, Sophie ends the relationship with Joel. Vicky plans to finish Dan but is heartbroken when he doesn't turn up. Ricci treats Vicky on her birthday making Charlotte jealous of Gaz not being as nice. With a house party in full swing, Ricci gets too drunk and announces on the DJ's tannoy that he's Vicky's new boyfriend and then has run-ins with James and Lucy, then fights with Gaz.
12	6	"The Girls Go to Far"	6 March 2012	0.686
Anna throws Gaz and Ricci out of the house. After agreeing to meet up with Joel, Sophie takes him back and they give their relationship another go. However Vicky starts an argument with Joel over the way he's been treating Sophie recently. The girls go to see a psychic and Charlotte's upset to hear that it's true love between her and Gaz. On a girls trip to Leeds, Rebecca feels left out and cries to Holly. Vicky stands her ground however and feels that Rebecca isn't being herself and is trying to impress everyone by being fake.
13	7	"The Truth Is Revealed"	13 March 2012	0.679
Gaz and Ricci return. Vicky tries to make Rebecca feel more involved in the group after finding out she spent the night crying. Returning home from Leeds to find flowers from Dan, Vicky admits she's had enough but then he ignores her when she spots him on a night out. When the boys go to the strippers, Vicky's not happy about the idea of Ricci going so he stays in the house. With the girls expecting the boys to bring the strippers back to the house, they sabotage the hot tub and their rooms. There's consequences though when they come back alone.
14	8	"We Are Family After All"	20 March 2012	0.711
The group are brought back together as they all decide to call a truce. Ricci and Vicky rekindle their relationship leaving the boys confused. Charlotte and Gaz discuss their friendship and think they'll be married in the next 10 years. For the last night, they all have a party and James finally gives into Holly and they have sex again. Rebecca decides to resolve her differences with Vicky but she doesn't want to know. Sophie spots Joel flirting with a girl in front of her so finishes him again and tells him to go. Everyone says an emotional goodbye before returning home.

=== Series 3 (2012) ===
No. overall	No. in season	Title	Original release date	Viewers (millions)
15	1	"The Geordies Hit Cancun"	26 June 2012	0.962
The cast arrive in Cancun, Mexico and Cancun Chris, their new boss tells them all to look after the house and not to touch his tequila. Jay announces he has a girlfriend, Holly admits she has feelings for James and gets jealous when he tries to pull on a night out, whilst Charlotte turns Gaz down when he tries it on with her. Sophie, who's back with Joel, gets a shock when she hears another girls on the other end of the phone when she phones him. As Charlotte and Rebecca fail to follow Cancun Chris' instructions, they're kicked out the house.
16	2	"James' Drought"	3 July 2012	0.875
Sophie's paranoia continues when Joel fails to answer his phone numerous times, and she seeks support with the rest of the group. Holly attempts to get James drunk and into bed but it backfires and she ends up getting too drunk herself and trashes the house. Charlotte and Rebecca return to the house, and Charlotte gets emotional of how well her and Gaz are getting on as friends instead of having sex. Vicky and Ricci clash again over an argument about a spilt drink, and their relationship is in turmoil over Vicky's confession.
17	3	"Nurse Holly"	10 July 2012	1.021
The boys go Mexican wrestling but it all ends in disaster when James breaks his leg, and Holly volunteers to look after him for the rest of the holiday, but she has an ulterior motive. Charlotte and Gaz continue to stay away from each other, but Gaz is the first one to give in and makes a move on her. Joel arrives to surprise Sophie but she isn't impressed when he flirts with other girls in front of her. Ricci and Vicky call a truce and make their feelings towards Joel perfectly clear.
18	4	"Vicky and Holly's Task"	17 July 2012	0.819
Gaz isn't impressed when Charlotte meets up with Andy on his birthday, and is even more upset when he doesn't pull and Charlotte comes back with Andy. Holly and Vicky go to collect a package for Cancun Chris but are stranded when Vicky drains the car battery. After getting drunk, Vicky leaves to calm down. Holly arrives back to the house alone and Ricci goes looking for a missing Vicky. Sophie still has trust issues with Joel when she sees him flirting again, and Holly finally gets what she wants by having sex with James again.
19	5	"The Tequila Trip"	24 July 2012	0.936
Ricci and Vicky return to the house and are shocked at Holly's confession. Sophie gets emotional as she says goodbye to Joel before he returns home, and she admits that she'd rather be back in England than in Mexico. Cancun Chris isn't happy when Gaz drinks his tequila, so as punishment he sends Charlotte and Gaz on a long trip to go and get another bottle, but after spending a day looking for the specific bottle, they end up losing it on the journey home. James realises that he's in too deep with Holly so ends their brief fling before feelings start to develop.
20	6	"The Argument"	31 July 2012	0.835
Jay reveals some home truths to Rebecca causing a rivalry between them, and Gaz and Charlotte clash again in a club. Ricci's not impressed when Vicky throws her bra on stage when Sophie and Holly are doing karaoke, and there's huge arguments between them. Sophie leaves everyone emotional when she reveals she's going home, whereas Ricci announces to Gaz that he'll be proposing to Vicky. On Sophie's last night, Ricci isn't happy when Vicky gets drunk and the pair immediately fall out again, and there's consequences. Sophie returns home to Newcastle.
21	7	"Vicky's Having Doubts"	7 August 2012	0.616
With Chloe on her way, Jay clears the air with Rebecca to avoid any awkwardness. The group find out that Ricci's still planning to propose to Vicky and Gaz helps him go ring shopping. Meanwhile, Vicky arrives at the house to collect her belongings and tells the girls she's having second thoughts about the relationship. Charlotte accidentally tells Gaz she loves him when they go on a day out together, and Holly and James continue to grow closer. Jay tells Chloe that he'll be leaving Geordie Shore forever but isn't sure how to tell everyone.
22	8	"The Big Question"	14 August 2012	0.991
Ricci finally proposes to Vicky and she says yes before the pair get a flight back home to Newcastle. Another argument between Gaz and Charlotte erupts and Gaz smashes up the house with anger. James fears that he and Holly will end up like Gaz and Charlotte so ends their brief fling. Jay drops a bombshell on his birthday and tells everyone he will be leaving Geordie Shore for good and everyone gets emotional. Gaz and Charlotte call a final truce and with emotions running high, everyone returns home to Newcastle.

=== Series 4 (2012) ===
No. overall	No. in season	Title	Original release date	Viewers (millions)
23	1	"Gary Meets His Match"	6 November 2012	0.975
As the cast arrive back in the Geordie Shore house, they're joined by Scott and Dan. Charlotte reveals she's got a boyfriend but Gaz gets overprotective over her when Dan gets too drunk and tries it on. Following the drama from the first night, Dan apologises to everyone. Anna announces that the group's new job is massaging, and Vicky asks the girls to be bridesmaids for the wedding. Holly and Scott get close and end up having sex in the toilet causing awkwardness for James, and the group are annoyed by Gaz's sudden bond with Scott.
24	2	"The Engagement Party"	13 November 2012	1.005
The group plan an engagement party for Vicky and Ricci but Charlotte is anxious at how her boyfriend will react to meeting everyone. Vicky arranges to set Holly up with a boy at the party but they don't seem to have much in common. After Charlotte's boyfriend gets too drunk, he trashes the place before he's kicked out. Further arguments escalate between Sophie, Vicky and Ricci causing a lot of violence and them being removed from the house the next day. With a few days thinking about everything, Vicky returns as the girls decide to get some fish, Scramble and Egg.
25	3	"Holly's First Date"	20 November 2012	1.069
James confesses to having a girlfriend but doesn't have the heart to tell Holly about it, and Dan is furious with Scott when he keeps taking his girls off him in clubs. Charlotte loses control by getting too drunk and climbs into bed with Gaz, but he climbs straight out knowing that they would both regret it in the morning. The group go on a road trip to Liverpool and Holly is distraught to find out the truth about James. Back in Newcastle, Sophie and Ricci return but there's a lot of tension as Vicky refuses to accept Sophie's apology, and Holly goes on her first date.
26	4	"Just Apologise Sophie"	27 November 2012	0.941
Charlotte meets with her boyfriend to tell him about Gaz but before she has a chance to fully explain herself, he ends the relationship and walks out. James goes all out to impress his new girlfriend Kate, whilst there's still a lot of tension between Sophie and Vicky. Holly sees her date on a night out and gets closer to him, meanwhile Gaz and Charlotte get along better than ever as they spend time together working. Vicky finally approaches Sophie and gives her a chance to fully apologise, and Holly's heartbroken when James introduces Kate to the group.
27	5	"It's All About the B's"	4 December 2012	1.049
Holly's far from impressed when she meets up with her date again and he's over keen, meanwhile Sophie tries to set Dan up with random girls. Ricci gets too drunk and accuses Vicky of flirting with a bouncer which causes a huge argument between the pair. Vicky decides she needs a break from Ricci and he asks for the engagement ring back before packing his bags and leaving the house. Sophie is delighted when Joel comes up to visit her but the group still find it hard to trust him. Charlotte's recent anger comes bubbling to the surface causing her to destroy the house.
28	6	"Hello Dublin"	11 December 2012	1.042
For James' birthday, the group plan a surprise trip to Dublin and secretly invite Kate along. Whilst away, Vicky gets emotional after seeing James and Kate together and realises how much she misses Ricci. Holly strikes an unexpected friendship with Kate, and Scott and Dan clash again over a girl on a night out. Returning home, Vicky is horrified as the other girls visit a sex shop but Gaz is happy to go along with them. Ricci arrives back in the house and announces he's leaving the house for good to save his relationship.
29	7	"The Girls Try Comedy"	18 December 2012	0.935
Vicky's feeling emotional without Ricci but knows him not being in the house is for the best. Gaz puts doubts in Sophie's mind about Joel so she follows him to a club where he's DJing to see if he flirts with girls. As the group go for a camping trip, there's a clear connection between Holly and Scott. Anna arranged for the boys to be auctioned for charity and Dan is bought by a cougar, whereas Holly wastes no time in bidding for Scott. Charlotte gets involved in a bidding war for Gaz and realises that the feelings for him are coming back.
30	8	"An Emotional Ending"	18 December 2012	0.937
After spending days away from Ricci, Vicky finally decides it's time to leave the house so returns home. With false rumours about Sophie cheating being spread, Joel confronts her about it causing a huge argument between the pair. Holly confesses her love for James putting him in an awkward situation, and Dan admits he's finally had enough of feeling left out of the group. As everyone packs their bags to return home, Gaz kisses Charlotte leaving her confused over both his and her own feelings towards each other.

=== Series 5 (2013) ===
No. overall	No. in season	Title	Original release date	Viewers (millions)
31	1	"Amsterdam Welcomes the Geordies"	19 February 2013	0.875
As the Geordie Shore cast arrive in the Newcastle house, Anna announces her new Geordie Tours company and sends them all to Amsterdam to lead stag and hen parties. There's an atmosphere as James follows strict instructions from Kate to stay away from Holly. The new Europe boss Sam arrives and sends Gaz and Scott to work, but they love it when they realise they can work whilst getting drunk and pulling girls. The tables turn as Gaz is all over Charlotte but she keeps rejecting him, but after getting far too drunk, she can't resist getting into bed with him.
32	2	"You Will Get Punished Dan"	26 February 2013	0.797
The group return to Newcastle and Charlotte immediately regrets having sex with Gaz. Dan pulls a girl at work leaving Anna angry, and there's consequences for him as he has to clean a mini-bus whilst the others head off go-karting. Ricci and Vicky celebrate their one year anniversary and are delighted to break the Geordie Shore relationship curse. Vicky notices Holly's pain when Kate tells James not to speak to her. It's war between the boys and the girls over who pulls the most, and Charlotte's asked out on a date by Graeme.
33	3	"Here's How to Be a Lady"	5 March 2013	0.862
Charlotte and Holly go on a double date with Graeme and his brother but it doesn't go very successful. As Kate joins the group on a night out, Holly can't help but feel heartbroken and lets out all her emotions to Vicky. Ricci and Vicky clash again after he calls her a name when drunk, and an angry Scott gets into bed with Holly. Charlotte gives into temptation and has sex with Gaz again then tells the girls that she's taking a break from pulling, but promises it's not for Gaz' benefit. Holly and James are put in an awkward situation when they're asked to work together.
34	4	"Let's Take Over Prague"	12 March 2013	0.857
The group head to Prague for the next part of their Geordie Tour but there's clear tension between Charlotte and Gaz. With both Gaz and Charlotte stopping each other from pulling, the pair end up in a heated argument but they're brought back together again when Gaz gets too drunk and tells Charlotte he loves her. Scott and Charlotte decide to leave the group and explore Prague on their own but it turns into a disaster after they stop at an absinthe bar. On a night out, Charlotte's confused over the feelings she has for Gaz and the boys go to the strippers.
35	5	"Old Habits Return"	19 March 2013	0.877
The group return home, and Charlotte and Graeme go on a second date. Vicky and Ricci's turbulent relationship comes to an end after Ricci refuses to let Vicky have a spray tan. Sophie is shocked to hear Kate admitting she's responsible for James ignoring Holly, and encourages them to call a truce. Psycho Charlotte's back as her jealousy increases on a night out causing her to destroy the house and hit Gaz with a lamp. Holly and Scott get carried away in the hot tub and end up in bed again, whilst Dan brings home a cougar.
36	6	"The Boys Get Their International Wings"	26 March 2013	0.902
Charlotte returns to the house and instantly apologises to Gaz for her behaviour, admitting she’s getting increasingly jealous of him getting with other girls. Anna announces the next leg of the Geordie Tours before the group head to Barcelona. Whilst at work, the group see a new side to Vicky when she seems to be enjoying herself mingling with the stags, but Sophie fears that Holly may be falling for Scott. With an atmosphere building, Charlotte drops a bombshell on Gaz by confessing her love for him.
37	7	"House Party Disaster"	2 April 2013	1.017
Charlotte feels like there’s been a weight lifted off her shoulders following her confession to Gaz, but the group can sense a clear atmosphere between them. James’s plans to unite to group with a bootcamp session doesn’t end well as the girls runaway, and Vicky arranges to meet Ricci to end things completely with him. As Ricci enjoys his Geordie Shore send off with the boys, the girls buy another fish for Charlotte. The gang host an American themed house party, but when Charlotte catches Gaz going upstairs with a girl, a huge fight erupts leaving Charlotte injured and Gaz storming out of the house.
38	8	"Apres-Ski"	9 April 2013	1.073
Anna kicks Charlotte out of the house again following her recent behaviour, then sends the remaining housemates to Tignes for the final leg of Geordie Tours. The girls are unable to forgive Gaz for being the main reason for Charlotte’s absence, and Vicky is far from impressed when Joel turns up in France. The boys get even more competitive as they go skiing, but Holly and Dan realise physical activity isn’t good for hangovers. Back in Newcastle, the group head out for one final night out where Vicky is nervous about seeing Ricci, and Gaz makes one last attempt to make things up to Charlotte.

=== Series 6 (2013) ===
No. overall	No. in season	Title	Original release date	Viewers (millions)
39	1	"The Gang Go Down Under"	9 July 2013	1.108
The group arrive in Sydney without Charlotte or Scott. James and Holly try to call a truce but end up fighting again. Scott arrives and everyone notices a sudden change in Gaz. An emotional James confides in Vicky about not fitting in with Gaz and Scott. Holly loses her temper with James, leading to her being thrown out the house, and Charlotte arrives but avoids Gaz. With James enjoying himself more on a night out without Holly, Charlotte stays in and is delighted when a familiar face returns to Geordie Shore, Jay!
40	2	"Family Means Family"	16 July 2013	1.133
Holly returns and clashes with Scott over the bed situation causing him to wreck the house. Steve the Shearer isn't impressed with his actions and decides to punish him. Jay spends his birthday in the house before returning home leaving James upset. Vicky goes on her first date since breaking up with Ricci, whilst Charlotte tries to prove that she's not boring despite respecting her boyfriend back at home and not pulling. The girls rage at Scott as he attempts to get a girl on family night, and James attempts to call a truce with Holly.
41	3	"House Divides"	23 July 2013	1.099
With Gaz and Scott continuing to cause annoyance in the house by going out pulling, James and the girls stand up to them and tell them they're not wanted. James is removed from the house for his behaviour, whilst Gaz and Scott decide to take a break. In an all girls house, Sophie tells Charlotte that Joel will be arriving soon leaving her jealous. When the boys return, James and Holly finally set aside their differences and make friends again. The singles decide to have a family night which leads to Holly and Scott having sex, and Gaz and Vicky getting flirty.
42	4	"Vicky Meets Dan"	30 July 2013	1.043
Joel arrives for Sophie, and there's clear jealousy between James and Charlotte. The boys arrange for Dan, an Australian personal trainer to put the girls through their paces but Vicky's overwhelmed with feelings for him. Scott and Gaz clash over how many girls each other have pulled causing another divide in the group. James arranges for Kate to come to Australia but away from the group. As James departs, Charlotte also considers leaving for good. On a day out with Dan, Vicky tries her best to impress him, and Steve sends some of the group to The Outback.
43	5	"Anger Management"	6 August 2013	1.013
Still in the Outback, Charlotte decides that's she'll be staying in the house rather than going home. Meanwhile, Sophie, Scott and Joel visit a nudist beach. An anger management session is arranged for the group, and Charlotte lets out all her negative feelings towards Gaz. Scott and Gaz go skydiving for Scott's birthday, then Gaz finds out he needs to go to work with Charlotte. James returns to the house after spending a week with Kate but is anxious of how Scott and Gaz will be around him. Sophie and Joel get too drunk and embarrass the group on a night out.
44	6	"The Haunted House"	13 August 2013	1.006
As Charlotte goes crazy and wrecks the house, Holly also finds herself getting angry with Scott causing all three of them to be kicked out of the house by Steve. As further punishment, Sophie, Gaz, Vicky and James are sent to the most haunted house in Australia. Returning to the house, it's clear that Vicky's making the most of her single life. Charlotte arrives back early but Steve sends Scott and Holly on an errand for him, but both end up drunk and get into bed with each other. Dan surprises Vicky by turning up to the house.
45	7	"The Pie Shop Argument"	20 August 2013	0.941
Holly and Scott return to the house and confess to their bedroom antics whilst Gaz secretly plans a trip away for the singles in the house. After a big night out, Vicky clashes with Gaz which angers James. When Gaz says he'll get Vicky kicked out of the house, James punches him. However it backfires and James is removed from the house by Steve. Not letting the recent events ruin their trip, the singles still go to Australian paradise where Gaz and Vicky call a truce. Scott's ongoing mission to pull random girls continues to anger Holly.
46	8	"Goodbye Australia"	27 August 2013	0.963
The singles return from their trip to find out that James has been removed from the house, and Steve isn't impressed with Gaz after the girls all lie about the fight and claim Gaz instigated it. Left with no choice, Steve kicks Gaz out the house and makes him stay with James. Vicky gets emotional at the thought of going home and meets up with Dan one last time. Gaz leaves Charlotte a note explaining his feelings towards her but she refuses to read it. One by one they all say goodbye to each other before returning to Newcastle but Gaz returns to give Charlotte a special send-off.

=== Series 7 (2013) ===
No. overall	No. in season	Title	Original release date	Viewers (millions)
47	1	"The Bucket List"	17 September 2013	1.010
The arrival of Sophie's cousin, Marnie causes tension in the house and Holly is far from impressed when she sees her flirting with Scott. Gaz is surprised when he gets close with Charlotte again despite her having a boyfriend, and determined to fix all the problems in the group, Vicky warns Charlotte and Marnie about their behaviour towards both boys. For their bucket list, Charlotte gets pet chickens for the house, whilst James and Vicky attempt to fly a plane. Sophie is torn between her cousin's feelings towards Scott and Holly's heartache.
48	2	"Double Dating"	24 September 2013	1.024
Marnie and Scott's continuous flirting angers the girls in the group and Gaz thinks he's losing his best friend. An argument with Marnie after a night out with causes Scott to wreck the house then leave before returning the next morning. Charlotte has relationship troubles at home so leaves the house to fix things with Mitch. Sophie loses patience with her cousin until Joel arrives to fix the family divide. Vicky isn't impressed when Marnie asks to go out with the boys after originally planning to stay in with the girls. Charlotte's upset after discovering that Egg is ill.
49	3	"Holly's Birthday"	1 October 2013	1.031
Charlotte is distraught after hearing that Egg has died, and the group go to a memorial at the beach to spread his ashes. Anna reveals that Sophie and Vicky have left the house. Holly's 21st birthday causes drama as she prepares for a huge house party, but following an argument with her about Kate, James leaves the house refusing to go to the party. Scott and Marnie clash as Marnie kisses one of Scott's friends after originally agreeing not to. Gaz is shocked at Marnie when she climbs into bed with him and her friend, but she then worries that Scott may find out.
50	4	"It All Kicks Off"	8 October 2013	1.052
When Anna asks Gaz and Marnie to go to work together, Charlotte and Holly are convinced they will get up to something behind Scott's back so hatch a plan to follow them. After seeing the pair flirting, Charlotte and Holly have no choice but confront them causing a huge fight in a club. With Marnie leaving the house following the events, Scott also decides to take a break. Jay returns to the house to fix all the problems. To clear the air, Scott rejoins the group as they all go on a trip to Scotland, but there's clear tension between Gaz and Scott.
51	5	"First Impressions Stick"	15 October 2013	1.054
Jay leaves the house having brought the family back together, but there’s still one thing on everybody’s mind; Marnie! The girls make a scene when she returns to patch things up with Scott, and Charlotte is left questioning the boy’s loyalties. Holly worries that Gaz and Charlotte are getting close again, and Marnie finally makes amends with the girls when they see her dancing on her own all night. The group head to London for their item on their bucket list, where Marnie gives Scott an ultimatum and Mitch turns up on a night out drunk and kicking off with Charlotte. Holly isn’t impressed when Charlotte chooses going home with Mitch over staying with the group.
52	6	"So Much for Family Night"	22 October 2013	1.068
Holly continues to wallow as it sinks in that Charlotte chose Mitch over the group, and she has a lot of apologising to do when she returns to the house. After overhearing a negative conversation about her boyfriend, Charlotte has no choice but to pack her bags and leave. Marnie considers having sex with Scott but is left red faced when she catches him attempting to pull girls on the last night. Holly gets emotional after realising nobody cares about family night anymore, and Gaz plans the last item on the bucket list. With Marnie and Scott still confused over their feeling for each other, everybody says goodbye before leaving the house.

=== Series 8 (2014) ===
No. overall	No. in season	Title	Original release date	Viewers (millions)
53	1	"Gaz's Birthday"	22 July 2014	1.162
The Geordies are back, and during their first night on the Toon getting mortal Gaz arrives with a surprise: his name is Aaron, he's Gaz's mate, and he's the new lad in the Geordie Shore house.
54	2	"Lad Code"	29 July 2014	1.160
New boy Aaron has made it his mission to get with Holly but Holly wants to know if he's serious, so she gives him a task to complete.
55	3	"The Family's Reunited"	5 August 2014	1.175
Charlotte's back! And her arrival couldn't have come at a worse time, as she walks in on a double date and finds out all about Gaz getting with Marnie.
56	4	"Tash On Tours"	12 August 2014	1.031
With Charlotte back in the house, all eyes are on Gaz and Marnie and whether they'll decide to continue sleeping together.
57	5	"The New Boy"	19 August 2014	0.936
Things kick off in the house as Aaron hears Vicky and the girls slagging him off on the eve of his third date with Vicky.
58	6	"A Trip to Iceland"	26 August 2014	1.053
New boy Kyle gets properly settled into the house by spending the night with Holly!
59	7	"Marnie Exposes Gary"	2 September 2014	1.022
The group wake up in Iceland with mixed feelings. The girls are angry with the lads for 'pie-ing' them last night and pulling girls.
60	8	"Aye Do"	9 September 2014	1.063
Will Aaron and Marnie finally get together and will Gaz and Scott make up after Gaz broke his own Lad Code?

=== Series 9 (2014) ===
No. overall	No. in season	Title	Original release date	Viewers (millions)
61	1	"Episode 1"	28 October 2014	0.991
There is a shock for the others when Vicky is promoted to team leader, or "Boss Vicky" as she soon becomes known. She chooses who goes to work, but will she be able to keep everyone in check, and will she punish anyone who steps out of line?
62	2	"Episode 2"	4 November 2014	0.889
Boss Vicky takes the team to run their first gay "Tash-on Tours" job, with great success. But everyone is concerned about Charlotte when she reveals she is not happy and that all is not well in her relationship with Mitch.
63	3	"Episode 3"	11 November 2014	0.907
They all go to France without Marnie who has not returned to the house after kissing Kyle at Holly's house party. Kyle is left to bear the brunt of the anger from the lads in Paris.
64	4	"Episode 4"	18 November 2014	0.925
Vicky is in trouble with Boss Anna after making a mess of the Tash on Tours job in Paris. As a punishment, Anna asks Vicky to make 200 origami swans for a Japanese-themed event. It is up to Vicky to make everyone work together to make them, but Marnie decides she cannot be bothered and sets herself on a collision course with Vicky.
65	5	"Episode 5"	25 November 2014	1.118
Marnie and Vicky's reconciliation is short lived when Vicky discovers Marnie has been lying to her all along. A Tash on Tours night in Charlotte's home town of Sunderland ends in disaster when Aaron sees Marnie and Scott being too close for his liking.
66	6	"Episode 6"	2 December 2014	0.798
The Geordies are going out of the Toon and into the country to host a Tash on Tours night at Lakefest in Gloucestershire. Charlotte and Gaz have their first real test when Charlotte spots Gaz flirting with a girl at the hoedown. Will she be able to hold back from turning into "Psycho Charlotte" and will Gaz be able to prove to her that he really has changed?
67	7	"Episode 7"	9 December 2014	0.912
The "boyfriend club" is well and truly up and running with Charlotte, Holly and Marnie all waking up in the boys' bedroom. Vicky is feeling left out and missing her boyfriend James so the gang arranges a surprise visit for her. Will this make Vicky feel happier in the house or remind her of what she is missing even more?
68	8	"Episode 8"	16 December 2014	0.947
Tis' the season to get Mortal! It is Christmas time in the Geordie Shore house and, like every other family Christmas, it is not without its festive finger-blasting, tantrums round the tree and mayhem under the mistletoe.

=== Series 10 (2015) ===
No. overall	No. in season	Title	Original release date	Viewers (millions)
69	1	"Episode 1"	7 April 2015	0.839
Buzzin'! Our favourite party animals are back! When Charlotte finds out about a pact between Gary and Aaron she hatches a plan - but will she end up with egg on her face? Meanwhile James is having doubts about his future in the house.
70	2	"Episode 2"	14 April 2015	0.861
It's all change in the house as James makes a shock announcement and two new housemates come through the door. But the newbies' first night out is ruined when a huge fight breaks out between Charlotte, Marnie and Holly.
71	3	"Episode 3"	21 April 2015	0.946
It's the Newbies first morning in the house but with Holly, Kyle and Charlotte gone how will the family get back together? Holly opens her heart to Kyle but does he feel the same? And a shock revelation from Gary leaves Charlotte heartbroken.
72	4	"Episode 4"	28 April 2015	0.858
It's the day that Charlotte's been dreading, Gary introdices his new girlfriend to the family but will Psycho Charlotte put in an appearance? Meanwhile Marnie and Aaron get very flirty!
73	5	"Episode 5"	5 May 2015	0.845
Anna tells the Geordies she's got a job for them in another Country they're all buzzing! That is until they turn up to a Caravan site in Wales Marnie decides to give Aaron some home truths
74	6	"Episode 6"	12 May 2015	0.857
Hamburg is about to feel the full force of Tash on Tours, but are they ready for Marnie kicking off at Aaron?
75	7	"Episode 7"	19 May 2015	1.004
Newbie Chloe meets 'psycho Charlotte' after a night out goes sour, and Holly's return to the house is ruined when she's confronted with the true reason Kyle doesn't want to make their relationship official ... is it all over for them?!
76	8	"Episode 8"	26 May 2015	0.986
Scotty T is back to 'jump start' the final episode with a dare-devil activity for his Geordie crew. Meanwhile, tensions run high as Holly waits to hear Kyle's decision.

=== Series 11 (2015) ===
No. overall	No. in season	Title	Original release date	Viewers (millions)
77	1	"Episode 1"	20 October 2015	1.003
The Geordies are back and buzzin' as big boss Anna sends them off to the home of kebab...Greece. Holly and Kyle kick off while Gaz and Charlotte find themselves in a very awkward situation
78	2	"Episode 2"	27 October 2015	0.945
Big boss Anna sends the guys to their new home in Crete. Chloe wants to know where she stands with Scott. Charlotte and Marnie have some explaining to do after their first night in Malia.
79	3	"Episode 3"	3 November 2015	1.246
Gaz's pulling competition causes a bust up for Aaron and Scott. Charlotte tells Holly some home truths about Kyle while the toga party sees Chloe and Scott get closer than ever.
80	4	"Episode 4"	10 November 2015	1.150
Chloe causes carnage at the boat party while Kyle comes to a big decision over Holly. Marnie sees Kyle at the club and the simmering tensions boil over and it all kicks off.
81	5	"Episode 5"	17 November 2015	1.250
Gaz gives newly dumped Holly some tough love. Kyle enjoys his first lads' night until the girls turn up unannounced. Charlotte kicks off leaving the boys and girls torn apart.
82	6	"Episode 6"	24 November 2015	1.158
Kyle and Holly's split continues to divide the boys and girls. Scott upsets Chloe, Holly confronts Kyle while Charlotte goes to extraordinary lengths in search of a kebab.
83	7	"Episode 7"	1 December 2015	1.182
Chloe's attempt to get Scott's attention goes badly while the Holly and Kyle situation comes to a head as the boys come to blows with huge consequences for Holly and Kyle.
84	8	"Episode 8"	8 December 2015	1.162
After his dramatic exit, the Geordies come to terms with life after Kyle. Chloe's plan to make Scott jealous backfires and Charlotte gives Holly some very tough love.
85	9	"Episode 9"	15 December 2015	1.250
Chloe and Holly kick off before Chloe confronts Scott and lets slip how she truly feels. Meanwhile, Marnie gets an unexpected call while Nathan has some big news for the family.
86	10	"Episode 10"	22 December 2015	1.148
The Geordie Squad's big Greek adventure comes to a dramatic end. There's a surprise arrival for one of the family and Marnie has some massive news.

=== Series 12 (2016) ===
No. overall	No. in season	Title	Original release date	Viewers (millions)
87	1	"Episode 1"	15 March 2016	1.202
The Geordies are back! Chloe turns on her charm to try to get with Scott. Holly has a huge secret but will she tell anyone? A shock new arrival sees the lads buzzin' and Chloe stressing.
88	2	"Episode 2"	22 March 2016	1.158
Charlotte finally turns up with some bunnies and some bigger news for Gaz. Will Holly share her secret? Aaron and Scott's dates with Chantelle end badly as the lads and Chloe all kick off.
89	3	"Episode 3"	29 March 2016	1.250
Charlotte gets the girls to go hard on Gaz, Scott drops the girlfriend bomb on Chantelle and Holly has a big bust up with Charlotte when she sees her kissing Chloe.
90	4	"Episode 4"	5 April 2016	1.303
With Holly away, Chloe and Charlotte's friendship goes next level. Chantelle's plan to test Scott goes badly wrong and Chloe is quick to take advantage.
91	5	"Episode 5"	12 April 2016	1.217
Boss Anna treats the Geordies with a trip to Hull.Gaz and Charlotte spend the night together, Chloe finally comes clean to Chantelle over what she gave Scott and it all Kicks off.
92	6	"Episode 6"	19 April 2016	1.367
Chloe is buzzin' when a new lad arrives. Marnie goes mental when a girl of Aaron's turns up and it kicks off again when the newbie drops Scott right in it with Chantelle
93	7	"Episode 7"	26 April 2016	1.220
Marnie necks on with new lad Marty to teach Aaron a lesson. Charlotte's got Chloe's back when it all kicks off between the girls. Gary and Charlotte end up in bed causing ripples.
94	8	"Episode 8"	3 May 2016	1.183
It's the final episode. Gary returns and drops a bombshell. New boy Marty can't get a stiffy with Chloe. Holly needs to make an all important decision and there's a shock exit!

=== Big Birthday Battle (2016) ===
No. overall	No. in season	Title	Original release date	Viewers (millions)
–	1	"Episode 1"	10 May 2016	1.186
The group arrive back at the house following Anna's instructions as Holly announces she's now single, and Charlotte and Gaz agree not to pull anybody else. Anna reveals that Charlotte and Gaz will be going head-to-head as team captains hosting party nights. As the captains choose their teams, the groups begin to plan their themed nights out but they receive another huge surprise when Sophie returns to the house joining Team Gaz. Charlotte is delighted to hear that Gaz turned down the chance to kiss another girl, and Holly refuses to make an effort for her team. After the first night out, Anna announces that Team Charlotte have scored the first point with their royal themed party.
–	2	"Episode 2"	17 May 2016	1.196
2 more faces walk through the door! There's a race to the shag pad but who will win? Gary shows Charlotte commitment she's never seen before, but is everyone happy for them?
–	3	"Episode 3"	24 May 2016	1.158
Boss Anna is livid after viewing some embarrassing footage. The house has been trashed! Two more old housemates arrive. Marty kicks off over Chloe, and Gary goes on a date with Charlotte.
–	4	"Episode 4"	31 May 2016	1.303
Holly's dream turns into reality as a blast from the past walks through the door! Charlotte's team vow to sabotage Gary as payback, but will they pull it off or will it backfire?!
–	5	"Episode 5"	7 June 2016	1.175
Scotty T is back! A night of partying at work leaves Charlotte's team buzzing and a huge mistake is made that forces Gary to leave the house. Is it all over for him and Charlotte?!
–	6	"Episode 6"	14 June 2016	1.150
It's the final, but with NO Gaz and Charlotte upset both teams need new leaders. Anna has a surprise after the final parties...but who has won the competition?!

=== Series 13 (2016) ===
No. overall	No. in season	Title	Original release date	Viewers (millions)
95	1	"Episode 1"	25 October 2016	0.966
The Geordies are back! After jetting off to Magaluf, Marnie and Holly are having issues while Marty opens up to Chloe. Things are going well until Chloe gets jealous and it all kicks off.
96	2	"Episode 2"	2 November 2016	0.991
At a boat party in Ibiza, Aaron drop the G-bomb on Marnie, and single Gaz is back when he pulls Chantelle. But how will Holly react when she finds out?
97	3	"Episode 3"	8 November 2016	1.046
Big boss Anna is fuming when the squad finally return from Ibiza. Marnie's plan to get Aaron's attention backfires and the couple reach crisis point when Nathan gets involved.
98	4	"Episode 4"	15 November 2016	0.879
Chloe gets jealous of Holly and Marty and kicks off. Scott receives some big news and there's a shock arrival which has huge consequences for Gaz and Chantelle.
99	5	"Episode 5"	22 November 2016	0.979
It's seriously awks between Sophie, Gaz and Chantelle. Aaron finally returns but Marnie isn't happy. Chantelle and Marty clash over Chloe. Nathan takes getting mortal to the next level.
100	6	"Geordie Shore: 100th Episode"	29 November 2016	0.979
It's the morning after Chantelle's departure... Sophie gets some big news from boss Anna, Aaron ends up in an ambulance and Chloe goes all out to get over Marty at the pool party.
101	7	"Episode 7"	6 December 2016	0.997
Marty ends up in hospital after the beach party. Meanwhile Boss Anna has some big news for Sophie, Nathan has an unusual plan to help Chloe, and Gaz comes to a decision over Charlotte.
102	8	"Episode 8"	13 December 2016	0.989
It's Holly's birthday and she gets a massive surprise when Kyle shows up. Marty goes in on Chloe but takes it too far. Meanwhile, Aaron and Marnie's relationship reaches breaking point.
103	9	"Episode 9"	20 December 2016	0.889
The Geordies reach boiling point...Marty tries to make it up to Chloe, but will she forgive him? And is there any way back for Aaron and Marnie after the previous night's break up?
104	10	"Episode 10"	20 December 2016	0.805
In the series finale Chloe and Marty get flirty again, but can they really stay just good friends? Kyle gets some big news from Boss Anna, but the fallout will change the family forever.

=== Series 14 (2017) ===
No. overall	No. in season	Title	Original release date	Viewers (millions)
105	1	"Episode 1"	28 March 2017	0.976
Anna invites the Geordies back to the house but promises big changes for them, whilst Marnie is delighted to have Sophie in the family again. Marty makes a promise to Chloe that he won’t get with anybody in the house, just as three new female workers arrive as part of Anna’s big new plans for her business. Aaron takes an instant liking to Abbie, whilst Sarah rubs Chloe up the wrong way. After hearing a rumour about Marty and Zahida getting close in the taxi, Chloe’s eruption causes a huge brawl in the house.
106	2	"Episode 2"	4 April 2017	0.963
Chloe is forced to face the consequences of her actions as Anna removes her from the house, and Sophie apologises to the new girls for the drama she caused for them. Aaron and Marty try their luck with Abbie and Sarah, but are left red faced when both refuse to give them anything more than a kiss. A further two new workers are sent into the house as Anna reveals that the originals have the power to decide who stays and who goes. Elsewhere Billy’s left in a spin after getting worse for wear, and Sarah fears she may lose her place in the house.
107	3	"Episode 3"	11 April 2017	0.850
Chloe returns to the house with a lot of apologising to do. Nathan comes up with some plans to test the newbies to see who is the most radge, but a further new worker Elettra arrives to stir things up. After seeing Marnie and Aaron share a moment, Marty accuses her of playing with his friend’s emotions. Chloe finally stands up to Marty after realising he hasn’t been entirely honest with her, and Billy is left with a lot to prove when the originals name him as the weakest newbie.
108	4	"Episode 4"	18 April 2017	1.036
As Chloe promises to move on from Marty, she can’t believe her luck when a further new worker arrives and instantly catches her eye. Aaron is confused when he continues to grow closer to Marnie despite her having a boyfriend, and Chloe and Marty compete for the affections of the newbies in a bid to prove they’re over each other. Meanwhile Sam tries to prove why he deserves his place in the house, and Elettra fails to give Marty anything more than a kiss.
109	5	"Episode 5"	25 April 2017	0.879
Marnie is delighted when her old friend Chelsea arrives as the final new worker, but it’s not long before she’s got her claws stuck into Aaron much to Marnie’s annoyance. After meeting to discuss which of the newbies have impressed the most, the originals assign the new workers the task of hosting a house party. Marnie gives Chelsea the green light to go with Aaron, but is thrown into a spin when she witnesses them both getting intimate leaving her no choice but to leave the house to clear her head.
110	6	"Episode 6"	2 May 2017	0.810
The group wake up to find that Marnie has gone home, leaving Chelsea overcome with guilt. Sophie confronts Chelsea over the reasons for Marnie’s departure causing fallouts in the house eventually leading to another head-to-head between Chloe and Marty. Anna delivers a shock blow to the newbies as she sends Billy, Chelsea and Eve packing – but tells those remaining that they’re not safe just yet. Elsewhere Marnie returns to pour her heart out to Aaron, and Elettra and Chloe team up against Marty.
111	7	"Episode 7"	9 May 2017	0.869
Anna sends all the originals to Tignes but makes it clear that not all of the newbies will be joining them. The group are delighted by the return of Scott, who is desperate to meet the new females. Abbie and Sarah compete for Scott’s attention but it’s Sarah who ends up in his bed causing Marty to get rowdy. Just as Sarah tells Marty that she has growing feelings for Scott, she’s unaware of his sudden U-turn as he tries to graft Abbie instead. Chloe is there to pick up the pieces for an upset Sarah, and Anna announced that Elettra will not be returning to the house.
112	8	"Episode 8"	16 May 2017	0.846
Things get increasingly awkward for Abbie and Sarah when both are too stubborn to speak to each other, whilst Marnie arrives in France to catch-up on the latest drama. Seeing her friend getting emotional over Marty, Zahida unleashes her anger out on the boys. Sarah’s torn over her feelings for both Marty and Scott, and the girls fear her behaviour in the house will cost her a place in the house. Elsewhere Scott continues to graft Abbie, and Aaron and Marnie clash.
113	9	"Episode 9"	23 May 2017	0.882
Determined to get his friend over his ex, Gaz takes Aaron under his wing and tries to get him to pull a girl. Sarah and Abbie finally confront each other over the Scott situation, and Abbie agrees to end things for the sake of their friendship. After being pied by both Abbie and Sarah, Scott turns his attentions towards Zahida. Aaron spots an intimate moment between Scott and Zahida before reminding her that she has a boyfriend outside of the house. Elsewhere Sarah is left picking up the pieces when Zahida vows to leave the house after further rumours spread.
114	10	"Episode 10"	30 May 2017	0.811
Zahida is still in denial over kissing Scott as the group return home, but further rumours circulate when the pair leave the club early together. After getting with Scott for a second time, Zahida faces the wrath of Marnie who calls her out for cheating on her boyfriend. Elsewhere Anna sends Sam home when she chooses her top three workers. Scott makes a confession to Gaz, who immediately confronts Zahida with the truth. But her guilt leads her to go AWOL, leaving Gaz no choice but to expose the truth to the others.
115	11	"Episode 11"	6 June 2017	0.830
As Zahida returns to the house, Sarah and Abbie join forces and team up against her. Anna has a final twist in store for the newbies when she announces that she will only be keeping one of them on full-time. The rivalry between Marnie and Zahida reaches new heights following yet another argument, and Sarah and Zahida finally come face-to-face. Just as Chloe thinks she’s in a good place with Marty, her anger boils over when she catches him getting cosy with Sarah again.
116	12	"Episode 12"	13 June 2017	0.645
Chloe tries to hide the fact that she cares about Marty and Sarah’s night together. Anna has one final test for Abbie, Sarah and Zahida to see which one of them is right for the job, as the originals eagerly wait for the result. Abbie arrives at Nathan’s 80s themed house party announcing that she is the chosen one, whilst Scott has a crushing confession to make to Abbie. Chloe finally confronts Marty with the way she feels about him.

=== Series 15 (2017) ===
No. overall	No. in season	Title	Original release date	Viewers (millions)
117	1	"A Wasted Night In"	29 August 2017	0.716
The group return to the house, but Chloe is hiding a big secret from Marty. After noticing a connection between Abbie and Marty, Chloe gives them the green light to get with each other. Nathan is shocked to learn that Chloe has tried it on with Marty, and feels he can no longer defend his best friend. Elsewhere Abbie puts herself on a plate for Scott but gets nowhere, and Aaron leaves the house to focus on his MMA fight. Witnessing first hand Chloe’s treatment of Marty, Nathan loses his temper but ends up making matters worse.
118	2	"Dropping Like Flies"	5 September 2017	0.604
The atmosphere between Chloe and Nathan increases as Marty tries to bring the pair back together. Scott is forced to leave the house as his back pain becomes too much, whilst Abbie proves she doesn’t need him to have a good time by kissing another boy. Nathan sees a side to Marty he doesn’t like and is quick to jump to Chloe’s defence again, but when the group become fed up of the on-going arguing in the house, they feel it’s best to confront the situation head on. Chloe packs her bags and leaves after feeling that nobody is supporting her.
119	3	"Gary's News"	12 September 2017	0.687
Marty apologises to Chloe before bringing her back to the house, whilst Marnie visits Aaron to show her support to him before his big fight. Abbie is frustrated when Scott returns to the house and doesn’t even acknowledge her, so seeks comfort in the girls. Gaz is back with news that he’s now single and already has his sights set on Abbie, meanwhile Marty notices a connection between Marnie and Scott. As Marty gives Scott a warning about overstepping the boundaries, a fight erupts in the club, and Chloe proves she has got will power.
120	4	"Fight Night"	19 September 2017	0.567
The group head to Birmingham for Aaron’s fight but Marnie gets emotional, but after seeing him in action she realises she likes him a lot more than she thought she did. Abbie is jealous when Scott brings a girl back to the hotel. Back in Newcastle with Scott and Marty nowhere to be seen, Aaron is delighted by the welcome home party he’s received. Gaz makes it his mission to get with Abbie, whilst Marnie and Aaron finally give into temptation, and the gang have a naked food fight.
121	5	"Arrivederci Newcastle"	26 September 2017	0.544
Anna shocks the group by announcing that Scott and Marty won’t be returning to the house, before sending them all to Rome. Marnie and Aaron go on a date as the pair reveal that they’re happy with the way things are between them, whilst Abbie is delighted when Gaz continues to flirt with her. Elettra returns to the house and instantly catches Gaz’s eye, leaving the girls no choice but to interfere to make sure it’s Abbie who ends up in Gaz’s bed and not Elettra.
122	6	"Chloe's Challenge"	3 October 2017	0.487
Gaz plans a day trip out, where he decides he wants to focus his energy on Abbie rather than random girls. Realising that Chloe’s kick offs are ruining the group dynamics, Gaz nominates Nathan to speak to her about her attitude, however it all ends in disaster when their private chat turns into an argument. Elettra waves goodbye as the group return home to Newcastle, where Abbie gives into temptation once again and ends up in bed with Gaz. Marnie and Aaron’s flirting doesn’t go unnoticed by Sophie, whilst Nathan and Chloe fail to clear the air.
123	7	"The Triple Date"	10 October 2017	0.541
Aaron makes it clear to Gaz that he wants things to progress into a relationship with Marnie, but he’s unaware that she just wants to keep things casual. Nathan and Chloe finally fix the rift in their friendship, and Abbie plays Gaz at his own game. After worrying where her relationship with Joel is going, she receives a shock when he arrives in Newcastle with a surprise for her. Aaron is upset to hear the truth from Marnie, and the pair’s latest clash leaves Aaron in A&E.
124	8	"Has Gary Met His Match?"	17 October 2017	0.464
Aaron gives Marnie a heartfelt apology before preparing for their baby themed house party, and James makes a surprise return for the occasion. Gaz and Abbie compete to make each other jealous when their attention turns to other people, whilst Marnie gives Aaron a birthday present he’ll never forget. Abbie gives Gaz the green light to get with somebody else, before jumping into bed with his best friend. Elsewhere Marnie puts a drunk Aaron to bed, where he tells her three little words.
125	9	"Couples Counselling"	17 October 2017	0.371
A furious Anna punishes Aaron, Gaz and Marnie for skipping work. Gaz forces Marnie to be honest with Aaron about her feelings, but their conversation ends in disaster as the pair clash once again. Abbie admits she’s happy with where things are between her and Gaz, whilst Sophie gives Marnie some tough love. Elsewhere Marnie and Aaron have a heart-to-heart, and the group get emotional as they leave the house.

=== Series 16 (2018) ===
No. overall	No. in season	Title	Original release date	Viewers (millions)
126	1	"Parsnip Party"	9 January 2018	0.669
Anna recruits the Geordies back to the house where new boy Sam catches the eyes of both Chloe and Abbie. Marnie is left infuriated when Steph declares that she has unfinished business with Aaron, and Chloe and Abbie both compete for Sam’s affection. Aaron returns to the house with the announcement that Gaz won’t be returning, so the group decorate the house with parsnips in his honour. Things get awkward between Aaron and Marnie, and it’s Chloe who ends up in Sam’s bed.
127	2	"Chloe Confronts Abbie"	16 January 2018	0.715
The tension increases between Abbie and Chloe as the competition for Sam steps up a gear, whilst Aaron and Marnie are forced to explain themselves to Nathan after spending the night in bed together. Sam can’t believe his luck following a smooth with Abbie, leaving an angry Chloe lashing out. Chloe seeks advice from a loved one, whilst Nathan is annoyed by Aaron and Marnie isolating themselves. Elsewhere, Abbie is knocked for six when Chloe lays into her over her loyalties in the house.
128	3	"The Mams Come to Party"	23 January 2018	0.591
Abbie and Chloe both agree to take a step back from Sam, and Marnie plans to celebrate her birthday in style. Aaron becomes fed up of Nathan overanalysing his friendship with Marnie as she struggles to reassure her boyfriend Casey that nothing is going on between her and Aaron. As Nathan hits a nerve, Aaron is quick to bite. Elsewhere Anna sends the group to Tenerife but forbids Aaron from travelling with them, leaving Marnie with a difficult decision to make. Despite promising to stay away from Sam, Chloe ends up locking lips with him away from prying eyes.
129	4	"Chloe's First Date"	30 January 2018	0.605
Chloe feels bad for betraying Abbie so plans on telling her everything about her secret smooch with Sam, however someone else gets there first. Sam causes further ructions in the house after giving Abbie a proposition, leading to an alcohol fuelled confrontation. Elsewhere Sophie and Nathan give Sam some brutally honest home truths, and the group head to the water park to clear the tension. Despite agreeing to give Sam the cold shoulder, Chloe finds herself back in his bed.
130	5	"Tenerife Was a 10"	6 February 2018	0.660
Chloe is delighted when Sam agrees to take her on their first date but is left unimpressed by his chosen venue – up in the air. Abbie desperately tries to prove to herself that she’s over Sam by moving on with somebody else, whilst Sophie feels left out of the group. Back in Newcastle, Steph confesses to Nathan that she may have feelings for Aaron, and Sam asks Chloe out on a second date. Elsewhere Sophie misses having her cousin Marnie in the house, and a drunk Nathan starts a house food fight.
131	6	"Chicken Shop Date"	13 February 2018	0.605
Chloe is underwhelmed by her second date with Sam at a chicken shop. Sophie and Nathan both feel the strain as they confide in each other about missing their other halves, whilst Abbie tears up after feeling rejected by boys. Chloe upsets Sam following a misunderstanding with Abbie leaving Nathan to pick up the pieces, whilst Abbie goes on the pull in a bid to prove that she’s over Sam. Chloe vows to leave the house after an argument with Sam, meanwhile Nathan is left to look after Sophie after an eventful night out.
132	7	"The Girls Get Spiritual"	20 February 2018	0.666
Chloe decides to focus all of her energy on Sam and let nothing get in the way of them making a go of things, and Joel arrival puts a smile on Sophie’s face. Abbie enjoys the new positive vibes in the house, whilst Nathan gets in the way of Joel and Sophie’s night of passion. Steph is delighted when Aaron returns to the house. Chloe is left red faced when she catches Sam chatting up another girl, leading to a violent confrontation back at the house when she lashes out at him. Elsewhere, Aaron makes it clear to Steph that he’s not interested.
133	8	"The L Bomb"	27 February 2018	0.560
Marnie returns as Anna sends the group to Edinburgh, but puts Chloe on a drinking ban as punishment for her behaviour. Things get increasingly awkward between Chloe and Sam as both refuse to make the first move in sorting their differences out. Marnie questions Steph on her intentions with Aaron, whilst Chloe and Sam finally reach a good place in their relationship. Aaron and Marnie’s attempt to push Nathan’s buttons go too far when a personal comment leaves Nathan seething.
134	9	"Chloe's Barbers"	6 March 2018	TBA
Nathan is still annoyed with Marnie and demands an apology, but it takes Sophie to bring the bickering pair back together. Elsewhere Chloe’s insecurities prove a bump in the road for her and Sam, and Abbie relayed her fears to Steph. Sophie leaves the house to help out a family member in need, whilst Steph tells Chloe about Abbie’s private thoughts. Nathan takes the group golfing, and Steph and Abbie come to blows in Middlesbrough. Meanwhile, Sam and Chloe make their relationship official.
135	10	"The Toilet Trip"	13 March 2018	0.514
Abbie and Steph agree to put their argument behind them, whilst Anna splits the group up on their last day together. Sam treats Chloe to a date where he has an important question to ask her, and Aaron is honest with his feelings towards Marnie. The group participate in a huge food fight, where Chloe and Sam sneak off to have some fun of their own, meanwhile Nathan is concerned when Marnie and Aaron disappear in the toilet for a while. Aaron and Marnie are unimpressed by Nathan’s questions, and everyone leaves the house.

=== Series 17 (2018) ===
No. overall	No. in season	Title	Original release date	Viewers (millions)
136	1	"Australian Additions"	15 May 2018	0.446
The Geordie’s are delighted when Anna sends them to Australia on business. New boy Grant catches Abbie’s eyes but she’s left concerned over unanswered questions over his sexuality. The group are far from impressed to receive a visit from their new boss, whilst four new Australian locals descend on the house causing chaos for the originals. Alex hits a nerve with Sam when he gets close to Chloe, and the girls compete for Grant’s attention. After flirting with Abbie, it’s Dee who ends up getting cosy with Grant causing her to erupt.
137	2	"On the Pull"	22 May 2018	0.479
Abbie clears the air with Dee following their previous altercation, whilst Sophie is feeling left out. The boys compete for Abbie’s attention but she’s less than impressed by Nick’s efforts. Nathan airs his fears that he’s drifting away from Chloe since her relationship with Sam, causing upset within the group. Grant finally apologises to Abbie for his behaviour. Elsewhere Sophie’s confidence is knocked when Dee snatches her man whilst on the pull, and the Geordies struggle with the Australian wildlife.
138	3	"Sneaking Off to Byron Bay"	29 May 2018	0.468
Grant tries to play the long game with Abbie before making his move. Nathan, Sam and Abbie face their fears during a skydiving trip, and Chloe takes offence to a comment made by Nathan about her relationship with Sam. With some of the group at work, the others decide to head to Byron Bay for the weekend. Chloe rages to hear that Sam has gone away, but takes the opportunity to make amends with Nathan. Elsewhere Dee and Nick clash, Chrysten enjoys time spent with the group without Chloe, and Abbie and Grant get closer.
139	4	"Family Reunion"	5 June 2018	0.540
The group in the Gold Coast get increasingly angry that there’s still no sign of the others, who are partying hard in Byron Bay. Sam and Sophie visit a fortune teller, and Nathan and Chloe come up with a revenge plan. When the gang are reunited, there’s fireworks as Chloe blows her fuse at Sam. Elsewhere Chrysten and Dee come to blows over a misunderstanding, and Abbie faces fresh upset after catching Grant seeking other girls. As Nick tries to take his girl back to an already engaged shag pad, Sam is livid with the disruption.
140	5	"The Next Step"	12 June 2018	0.489
Abbie fears that she’s turning into a psycho following yet another argument with Grant. Elsewhere, following a rough day at work Chrysten decides she’s had enough before leaving the villa for good. Chloe gives Sam a night he’ll never forget, and Dee is victim of a Geordie prank. Nathan gets emotional after receiving constant reminders of how much he’s missing his boyfriend, whilst Sophie and Alex share a shock kiss. Chloe decides to play cupid by seeking men for the single girls in the group, and Nick makes an embarrassing confession.
141	6	"The Shag Pad Invasion"	19 June 2018	0.450
The Geordie’s are far from impressed by their next job, whilst Nathan apologises for kicking off the night before. Abbie is left red faced when she sees Grant getting with somebody else at their first Australian house party. The next morning, news spreads of Grant’s shock decision to leave the house, but Alex is more concerned about Nathan’s feelings. Sam and Chloe rage with Alex when he misinterprets information, and Sophie seeks advice on Dee on how to pull an Aussie lad. Sam destroys the house after jumping to the wrong conclusion with Chloe.
142	7	"Look Who's Back"	26 June 2018	0.463
It’s the morning after the night before and Sam is left regretting his actions. In a bid to cheer everybody up, Nathan suggests go-karting but Abbie isn’t impressed. Sophie and Alex get increasingly closer following another boozy night, whilst Abbie fears she may be leading Nick on. Holly returns to the house to whip the workers back into shape. Sam loses his patience with Chloe once again when she says she wants to spend the night with the girls, which causes more drama for the couple. Elsewhere Holly is overcome with emotion after seeing Sam’s treatment of Chloe, reminding her of her past problems with Kyle.
143	8	"Queen Nathan's Birthday"	3 July 2018	0.517
Sam wakes up knowing he has a lot of apologising to do to Chloe once again. Sophie fears her feelings may be growing for Alex, whilst Sam and Chloe patch things up. Nathan plans a trip to the Outback for his birthday, but has one more request for the boys. Despite Nathan’s fear of horses, Chloe arranges a horse riding session for his birthday as a surprise. Elsewhere, when the group arrive at the Outback they’re far from impressed with the conditions they’re staying in – as Nathan announced that it’s his worst birthday ever. Making the most of a bad situation, Alex and Sophie take things to the next step.
144	9	"The New Geordie"	10 July 2018	0.433
It’s Dee’s birthday and to celebrate, the girls head to a strip club to learn some moves, however the boys gate-crashing leads to another bicker between Chloe and Sam. Sophie finally admits her feelings towards Alex, but he fears she’s only interested in him when she’s had a drink. The group return to the Gold Coast to find new Geordie Adam has moved in, who is an instant hit with the ladies. Dee wastes no time getting to grips with Adam, which leaves Abbie furious. Sophie and Alex give into temptation once more, whilst Dee and Abbie’s new found friendship hits the rocks as the pair have a violent showdown over Adam.
145	10	"Sam Busts His Hand"	17 July 2018	0.426
Abbie is full of regrets as she wakes up realising life’s too short to be arguing with her friends, whilst Sophie is happy about being in a good place with Alex. Dee and Abbie rekindle their friendship. Chloe is down in the dumps when Sam is forced to leave the house with an injury, whilst the house turns against Alex when he rejects Sophie after fearing he’s caught feelings for her. Dee confronts Adam when she hears he’s been bad mouthing her, Alex worms his way back into Sophie’s good books, and Chloe is depressed when she gets a taste of what life is like without Sam.
146	11	"Pride Party"	24 July 2018	0.467
Adam wants to apologise for the comments he made about Dee, but his attention is swaying towards Abbie instead. Nathan plans to host a Gay Pride house party, and Abbie’s Nana arrives as a special guest. Alex decides to play Sophie at her own game when he catches her receiving a lapdance from somebody else, but it has huge consequences when “Psycho Chloe” erupts as she defends her friend. Devastated by the events, Sophie takes her frustrations out on the villa instead. Elsewhere Sam returns from hospital, Sophie and Alex make peace, and Abbie receives a smooth from Adam.
147	12	"The Ultimate Food Fight"	31 July 2018	0.445
The Aussies take the Geordies to a boat party as a parting gift, where Sophie meets Alex’s friends for the first time. Adam continues to graft Abbie but she’s unsure on her feelings towards him. Elsewhere Chloe and Sam get each other’s names tattooed on them, and Alex and Sophie reminisce over their time spent together. Abbie begins to feel awkward as she tries to let Adam down gently, whilst Sophie is forced into an emotional goodbye with Alex as the Geordies head back home to Newcastle.

=== Series 18 (2018) ===
No. overall	No. in season	Title	Original release date	Viewers (millions)
148	1	"Gotta Have Faith"	16 October 2018	0.583
Anna sends the Geordies back to the house where she reveals that Scotty T will be returning as her new business partner. Faith arrives as the new family member and instantly gels with the girls, but has a secret she’s scared of sharing. Elsewhere Adam makes a move on Abbie unaware that she doesn’t feel the same way, and Chloe and Sam decide to make more of an effort with the rest of the group in order to keep the peace. Faith’s confession raises questions from Chloe, and Nathan gets up to no good when fuelled with alcohol.
149	2	"Geordie Dinner Party"	23 October 2018	0.454
Sam and Chloe host a house warming party to show off their new home, whilst Sophie meets up with a newly single James. Chloe is determined to learn more about Faith’s beliefs unaware that she may be causing offence. Adam finally gives up on Abbie when she rejects one of his kisses, Scotty T gives the Geordies their first mission, and Faith feels rejected during a night out with the group. Abbie and Adam’s competition to pull other people takes a surprise twist, and the tension between Chloe and Faith increases.
150	3	"Girls Trip"	30 October 2018	0.390
Sophie plans a trip to Blackpool for the girls while Scotty T sends the boys to work. Chloe and Faith’s feud continues following a failed attempt at an apology. Elsewhere, back in Newcastle Nathan kicks off with Sam after being humiliated by him in a club, and Adam ends up in bed with one of Abbie’s closest friends. The girls receive a shock when the boys arrive in Blackpool to surprise them, whilst Chloe and Faith finally call a truce. Adam and Sam begin to feel sorry for Faith after noticing her dancing on her own, meanwhile Nathan has an accident in a B&B.
151	4	"Sophie and Sam Fall Out"	6 November 2018	0.416
Sophie defends Faith when Chloe fears that she still isn’t being herself around the girls. The group return home but are faced with more drama when a passing comment from Sam makes Chloe question their relationship, and Sophie is quick to stand by her friend. Nathan confronts Faith when he feels that she’s isolating herself from the rest of the group, whilst Chloe and Sam take a break from the house in order to focus on themselves. Elsewhere Adam continues to try his luck with Abbie but is unfortunate to get nowhere.
152	5	"It's Snowing in Newcastle"	13 November 2018	0.474
Despite originally clearing the air, Sam still feels Sophie needs to stay out of his and Chloe’s business. Nathan makes it his mission to make Faith feel more involved in the group, whilst Abbie begins to feel awkward around Adam. Nathan is delighted when Chloe promises to spend the night with him rather than Sam, but is left disappointed again when her attention is drawn back to her boyfriend. Elsewhere Adam and Abbie come to blows when he makes another move on her, and Sophie and Sam call a truce for the sake of their housemates.
153	6	"Benidorm Bound"	20 November 2018	0.460
With the tension between Abbie and Adam increasing and Sophie feeling that Chloe keeps abandoning the girls, the group plan a games night in order to lighten the mood. Abbie confronts her friend for kissing Adam before throwing a drink over him instead, and then clashes with Faith for making insulting comments. Anna sends the Geordies to Benidorm to house sit, where Abbie has some making up to do. Elsewhere Sam has no choice but to defend his girlfriend during an argument with Sophie causing her to lash out and punch him.
154	7	"Nana Joins The Gang"	27 November 2018	0.401
It’s the morning after the night before in Benidorm and Sam demands an apology from Sophie. Elsewhere Nathan suggests a trip to the water park where Sophie and Chloe make amends. Nathan still feels there’s an atmosphere between him and Chloe but neither are willing to make the first move to resolve their differences. Abbie’s Nana joins the gang on a night out where she brings everyone together, and Chloe and Nathan finally clear the air. Sophie reveals that she’s really enjoying her single lifestyle, and Faith puts her pulling skills to the test.
155	8	"A Double Return"	4 December 2018	0.320
When the gang arrive back on home turf, they’re shocked by the arrival of Alex who has come to win back Sophie’s heart. However Alex instantly causes friction by flirting with Abbie and making her feel uncomfortable. Holly returns to the house to give Sophie some much needed advice, and Nathan is in his element as he visits Newcastle Pride. There are further fireworks when Sophie catches Alex in a compromising position with Abbie, causing an almighty row when they all arrive back at the house following a night out.
156	9	"Holly Gets a Shock"	11 December 2018	0.364
Chloe takes Sam on a date to the ice rink to show off her skills. Alex desperately tries to make amends with Sophie, but things take a turn for the worse when she spots another moment between him and Abbie. Elsewhere Faith lets her hair down, and Holly tells Sophie that Alex is just holiday romance material. Holly is horrified when Scotty T brings a blast from her past to work in the form of Kyle, and Alex finally makes it back into Sophie’s good books. A clearly shaken Holly has some choice words for Kyle, and it only makes Sam realise that his relationship with Chloe is stronger than ever.
157	10	"Geordie Fest"	18 December 2018	0.294
Abbie celebrates her 21st birthday in style as the group plan her a festival themed house party with her Nana as a special guest. Sophie and Alex take their relationship to the next step by going on an official date, whilst Nathan organises a colonic irrigation session for Abbie. On the last night, Sophie finally gives into temptation and has sex with Alex for the first time in Newcastle. The Geordies face another emotional goodbye to each other as Faith reflects on her turbulent stay.

=== Series 19 (2019) ===
No. overall	No. in season	Title	Original release date	Viewers (millions)
158	1	"All Change in the House"	9 April 2019	0.412
Scotty T drags the group back to the house for more work, but they’re shocked by the amount of absences. However it’s not long before newbies Beau, Bethan, Nat and Tahlia make themselves at home. There’s an instant connection between Beau and Bethan, but he also has his sights on Tahlia. Elsewhere Chloe and Nathan have a heart-to-heart about the breakdown of the relationship with his boyfriend, Tahlia is determined to move on from her ex-boyfriend, and Scotty T takes the workers on a journey they’ll never forget. Nat is there to support a broken Nathan.
159	2	"Nathan Needs a House Party"	16 April 2019	0.413
Nathan decides to embrace being single rather than feeling sorry for himself, and the group plan a house party in order to lift everybody’s spirits. Chloe is jealous of the attention Sophie receives from her boyfriend, feeling that Sam doesn’t give her enough, whilst Bethan and Beau admit to liking each other. Chloe is far from impressed when Nathan dares Tahlia and Beau to kiss during a trip to work, Sophie finds it difficult to separate herself from her boyfriend, and Abbie re-joins the group for a night out. The night quickly descends into chaos when Bethan catches Beau giving Abbie a kiss.
160	3	"Beau & Bethan Get It On!"	23 April 2019	0.406
It’s the morning after the night before and Beau’s concerned that Bethan won’t accept his apology. Elsewhere Nathan is hurt when Chloe doesn’t invite him to a girls night back at home, and Sam meets with Adam for a catch-up. Nathan and Chloe agree to disagree for the sake of their friendship, Beau tells Bethan that he’s still keen on getting to know her, whilst Tahlia lets her hair down and goes on the pull. Beau admits to feeling pressured by the others and would rather things develop naturally with Bethan, as Nat worries how her girlfriend will react following a drunken snog with Nathan.
161	4	"Buckle Up! The Geordies Hit Belfast!"	30 April 2019	0.417
Chloe feels like a third wheel in her own relationship as Sam and Nathan begin to spend more time together, as Anna sends the group to Belfast in their new bus. Beau admits to genuinely liking Bethan but wants to take things slowly, Sophie feels lost in the house without her boyfriend, and Tahlia finally begins to come out of her shell. After a few too many, Chloe loses her temper with Sam leaving him shocked by her accusations. Elsewhere Bethan can’t resist Beau’s charm any longer, and a distraught Chloe tells Sam that they need to go on a break.
162	5	"The Family Is Rocked!"	7 May 2019	0.302
Sophie is fed up of the drama in the house and contemplates leaving it all behind, whilst Nathan tries to fix the rift between Chloe and Sam. Sam learns that Chloe’s insecurities from her past relationships have been causing her lack of trust, and the pair decide to work around it. Sophie is knocked for six when Alex returns to the house leaving her with a huge decision to make about her future, and the group try out “Disco Dodgeball” for Anna. Tahlia enjoys the attention received from Alex, meanwhile Sophie sneaks off during a night out to pack her bags and leave the house for good.
163	6	"Trouble In Paradise!"	14 May 2019	0.330
Nathan meets up with Sophie to hear that she has no regrets to leaving the house, but would consider returning part time. Bethan is wary of Beau around Abbie when Scotty T sends the group on a singles night, whilst Nathan gets the man of his dreams. Beau faces Bethan’s wrath after his conversation with Abbie comes to light, Sam plans a gesture for Chloe in order to boost her self-esteem, and Tahlia and Adam share a kiss. Bethan bites the bullet to try and salvage what she and Beau have, but things go from bad to worse when he tells her their romance can’t continue.
164	7	"Beau & Bethan Back On!"	21 May 2019	0.269
Alex has some explaining to do when Beau notices him and Bethan flirting with each other on a night out. Tahlia confronts Nat over her patronising behaviour, whilst Sam surprises Chloe with a shopping trip. Bethan and Alex come to blows when neither take responsibility for flirting, leaving Scotty T to pick up the pieces during another day at work. Elsewhere Beau has a heart to heart with Chloe about his past relationships, and the only singles in the group Tahlia, Nathan and Alex get close in the hot tub. Bethan is over the moon when Beau agrees to giving her another chance.
165	8	"Cardiff Carnage"	28 May 2019	0.293
Scotty T sends the group to Cardiff for work, and Beau is delighted that he’ll get to see his brother who lives there. Bethan tells the girls that she’s happy with how her relationship with Beau is going; however he tells the boys that he’s not ready for a relationship with her yet. Elsewhere Alex has an accident during a water sports session, and Scotty T calls an end to the trip. The Geordies defy Scotty T by staying another night in Cardiff where Tahlia necks on with Beau’s brother. Beau is forced to let Bethan down gently when he realises that they aren’t on the same page.
166	9	"Dizzy Heights!"	4 June 2019	0.324
Anna dishes out punishments when she finds out the group stayed an extra night in Cardiff. Nathan suggests throwing a house party instead of going out, where Alex feels home sick as he’s surrounded by everybody else’s family and friends. Chloe jumps to the wrong conclusion when she spots Beau speaking to Abbie, and Bethan introduces herself to Beau’s sister. Elsewhere Tahlia is spoilt for choice when she has Adam and Beau’s brother competing for her attention, and Alex decides to head back to Australia. Bethan pulls out all the stops to ensure Chloe and Sam have a romantic night.
167	10	"Fight Night!"	11 June 2019	0.346
Nathan surprises Tahlia by arranging for Beau’s brother to join them on another night out. Chloe worries about the lack of sex she’s having with Sam, whilst Bethan heard from Beau’s brother what he’s really like outside of the house. The group show their support for former family member Aaron during his MMA fight, Bethan is overjoyed when Beau tells her he’s ready to finally commit to her, and Nathan admits to being ready to move on from his ex-boyfriend. The family say an emotional farewell to each other before all going their separate ways.

=== Series 20 (2019) ===
No. overall	No. in season	Title	Original release date	Viewers (millions)
168	1	"Shake Ups & Break Ups!"	29 October 2019	0.239
The Geordies return to the house with a different dynamic following Sam and Chloe’s split, and the rest worry how it’ll effect group situations. James is delighted to be back where he belongs, and Bethan is nervous when Abbie returns. Beau jumps to the wrong conclusion when he accuses Bethan of flirting with James, whilst Sam and Chloe feel awkward around each other. Beau soon realises he was in the wrong as he apologises to Bethan, but she tells him she needs space. Elsewhere Tahlia and James share a kiss, and Sam dreads an imminent conversation with Chloe.
169	2	"Give It Another Go!"	5 November 2019	0.311
Chloe wonders whether coming back to the house with Sam was the right thing to do, whilst Beau fixes his problems with Bethan. The group host another wild house party where Tahlia and James grow closer, and Chloe breaks down due to the on-going tension between her and Sam. Elsewhere, Abbie admits to feeling awkward around Bethan due to their shady past. Chloe and Sam leave the house to discuss their future, and return to announce they’re going to give their relationship another go. Chloe sees red when she doesn’t get the support she expected from the other girls.
170	3	"Tensions Keep Rising"	12 November 2019	0.330
Following the drama from the night before, Chloe refuses to speak to any of the girls for not having her back, whilst Sam asks the boys to respect his relationship. Bethan worries that Chloe has made the wrong decision by getting back with Sam, and she begins to see it for herself when he gives her no attention on a night out. Nathan gives Chloe and Sam an ultimatum for one of them to leave the house in order for the situation to be resolved but neither are willing to move out. Meanwhile Tahlia feels awkward when James brings a girl back, and Abbie confesses a secret to James about her time with Chloe in Ibiza.
171	4	"Party in Portugal"	19 November 2019	0.369
As Anna sends the group off to Portugal, Sam stays at home after realising it’s the perfect opportunity to give Chloe the space she needs. Bethan tries to squash the issue with Abbie but it’s a case of keeping her enemies closer when she admits she still doesn’t trust her around Beau. Chloe drowns her sorrows in the Algarve as she attempts to move on from Sam, whilst Tahlia and James end up in bed together again. Bethan unleashes her fury at Abbie when she catches her having an innocent conversation with Beau, and a distressed Chloe cries herself to sleep thinking about Sam.
172	5	"Agg on the Algarve"	26 November 2019	0.344
Tahlia wastes no time friendzoning James when she realises there’s no chemistry between them. Bethan and Abbie’s fallout causes an unfriendly atmosphere within the group leaving Nathan no choice but to intervene. Elsewhere Nat causes ructions by accusing Abbie of flirting with her, and labels Bethan’s relationship with Beau toxic. When Anna orders the gang to pack their bags and return home Abbie and Bethan finally call a truce for the sake of the family, Nat considers leaving after seeing the upset caused from the night before, and Beau is let in on Chloe’s secret betrayal.
173	6	"Fun at the Fair!"	3 December 2019	0.257
The Geordies head back to Newcastle where Chloe dreads a reunion with Sam. Nat decides to spend time with her girlfriend when the pressure of living in the house gets too much for her, and Beau asks Bethan to be his girlfriend. Bethan becomes increasingly jealous of Nat as Chloe sings her praises in a taxi home – and it all explodes when she decides to get things off her chest. Tahlia is spoilt for choice when James and Adam go head-to-head for her attention, Nathan visits Sam to see where his head’s at, and James contemplates exposing the truth about Ibiza.
174	7	"Geordies Do the Great Outdoors!"	10 December 2019	0.205
Chloe leaves the house to spend the night back at home with Sam in another attempt at mending their broken relationship. Nathan begins an online relationship but is nervous about meeting him for the first time, and Tahlia and James realise they’re much happier as friends. Chloe and Sam return after patching things up, Nathan plans a camping trip for the boys whilst Bethan plans a sophisticated day out for the girls. Chloe’s Mum questions Bethan on what she thinks of Chloe and Sam’s situation, and James tells Abbie that Sam needs to know the truth about Chloe.
175	8	"Breaking Point"	17 December 2019	0.238
James finally takes matters into his own hands and tells Sam the truth about Ibiza. Chloe is devastated when Sam puts her on the spot by questioning her about the kiss, but she’s quick to point the finger at Abbie for ruining her relationship. Abbie is racked with guilt when Sam demands the whole truth from her, whilst Bethan plans a birthday surprise for Beau. Following a night of intense drama, Sam calls it a day on his relationship with Chloe and leaves the house for good. Elsewhere, the group prepare for Beau’s birthday party, and Chloe follows her heart.
176	9	"Beau's Birthday!"	24 December 2019	0.250
James and Beau arrange a surprise for Nathan by inviting the boy he’s been speaking to online to the house party. Bethan gives Beau a birthday he won’t forget, whilst Abbie is shocked by her Nana’s behaviour at the party. Nathan is over the moon by how his night with Tommy went, and Anna sends James and Beau on a “Butlers in the Buff” job for a very special client – Abbie’s Nana. James admits the group dynamics are better without Chloe and Sam’s turbulent relationship in the house, but Abbie is scared it’s all going to go downhill when Chloe makes her imminent return.
177	10	"Serious Send Off!"	24 December 2019	0.248
Abbie is far from impressed by Chloe’s return to the house, but Bethan is over the moon to see her friend. As the group begin planning their final night on the town, Nathan decides to invite Tommy, whilst Sam decides to give it a miss for the sake of the family. Chloe heads home early after coming to a realisation regarding her relationship with Sam, and Nathan is disappointed when Tommy goes back to Amsterdam. Following one last crazy night, Beau, James and Nathan release their inner child and built a fort to sleep in. Nathan suggests they all set goals for next time.

=== Series 21 (2020) ===
No. overall	No. in season	Title	Original release date	Viewers (millions)
178	1	"Get This Party Started!"	28 July 2020	0.262
The Geordies return to work where Abbie notices an instant spark between newbies Ant and Amelia. Bethan feels like Beau is prioritising his friendship with Nathan over her, whilst Abbie still feels tension around Chloe. Amelia considers making a move on Ant but soon realises she has competition when she spots him flirting with Chloe. Anna helps boost team morale by sending everybody Rage Buggying, Nat and Chloe enjoy the newly single life, and Bethan lashes out when Beau chooses to spend time with Nathan rather than go to bed with her.
179	2	"Family Friction!"	4 August 2020	0.202
Nathan receives déjà vu as he realises Chloe may be getting too attached to Ant. Abbie plays Cupid by encouraging Amelia and James to share a kiss, and Bethan is concerned by the lack of time Beau is spending with her. James admits he’s enjoying the single life and doesn’t want anything serious with Amelia, and Nathan takes Chloe out for a long overdue catch-up about her love life. Ant goes on the pull after seeing a different side of Chloe on a night out, and Nathan has no choice but to intervene when he feels her feelings of jealousy are ruining the group vibe.
180	3	"It's Fright Night!"	11 August 2020	0.260
Anna attempts to transform the Geordies into a classy and sophisticated bunch to entertain her friends. Beau begins to feel guilty about not spending much time with Bethan so organises the ultimate gesture to put a smile back on her face. Elsewhere Ant confides in James about fancying Chloe, but Nathan has already encouraged her to stay away from boys. There’s finally unity amongst the girls when Abbie and Chloe clear the air, meanwhile Amelia hopes for another kiss with James. It’s tit for tat as the boys go head-to-head against the girls in a series of drunken pranks.
181	4	"Hello New Lad!"	18 August 2020	0.238
Nathan returns to the house following a short break, leaving Bethan fearful that she will become second best to Beau once again. Anna shocks the group by bringing new arrival Louis into the mix, who has an instant connection with Chloe. Amelia is left red faced after being encouraged by the girls to make a move on James - only to catch him talking to other girls. Elsewhere, Ant relays his feelings to Chloe when he feels replaced by Louis, and Amelia steals a kiss at the house party. Beau fails to understand the support an emotional Bethan needs when she opens up to him.
182	5	"Big Mistake!"	25 August 2020	0.232
Ant takes on Louis as he feels mugged off regarding the Chloe situation. Bethan feels more neglected than ever by Beau and seeks advice from the girls. Louis flips when he catches Chloe apologising to Ant for the way she’s treated him, and forces her to make a choice. Elsewhere Nat struggles with being newly single, and Nathan senses Chloe is playing the boys off each other after she ditches Louis to spend the night with Ant. Chloe admits to the girls that she wants to give things another go with Louis – but she has no idea what awaits her at the club.
183	6	"See Ya, Nat!"	1 September 2020	0.299
Nathan tries to make Chloe understand that her actions towards Louis and Ant have consequences. Elsewhere Nat take a bold step by covering up a tattoo of her ex-girlfriend’s name in order to finally give herself some closure. Bethan is in a better mood for spending time away from Beau, whilst Louis continues to play hard to get with Chloe. The group reel when Nat tells them she’s leaving the house for good, Louis gives into temptation by sharing a kiss with Chloe, and Bethan and Beau reach the end of the line following a heart-to-heart.
184	7	"Chloe Changes Her Ways!"	8 September 2020	0.209
Bethan decides to take some time away from the house for the sake of her relationship with Beau, whilst Ant wastes no time in getting one over Louis by telling Chloe exactly what he’s been saying behind her back. Amelia sets her sights on James once again and gets the kiss she desires, and Ant apologises to Louis for throwing him under the bus. The boys worry that Louis is playing with fire after he kisses a girl at a strip class, leaving Nathan fearful of how Chloe might react when she finds out. Amelia confronts James for blanking her after their kiss, and Chloe puts on a brave front around Louis.
185	8	"Geordie-licious!"	15 September 2020	0.210
Before the Geordies head back home to their normal lives, Anna has one last job for everybody to go out with a bang. Chloe decides not to dwell on the past and continues to pursue Louis instead. Nathan has a surprise for the group as he unveils his alter ego Aphrodite, whilst Amelia performs her best-selling single, and Beau reflects on his time apart from Bethan. Chloe thanks Louis for making her feel wanted again, Amelia is grateful to the family for making her feel welcomed, and Bethan returns to take back her man.

=== Series 22 (2021) ===
No. overall	No. in season	Title	Original release date	Viewers (millions)
186	1	"The Single Have Landed"	5 October 2021	134,000
The Geordies are out of lockdown and back in the house but this time they’re all looking for love. Heads are turned when a new group of single lads and lasses move in with the OGs and Nathan is overwhelmed with both Devon and Niko fighting for his affection. Bethan believes it’s love at first sight for her and Jay, meanwhile Abbie cracks on with Charlie. Elsewhere Roxy agrees to go on a date with Louis before necking on with James, Ant thinks he’s found a connection with India, and Chloe F sets her sights on Jack. Nathan gives into temptation and spends the night with Niko.
187	2	"Someone's Getting Dumped"	12 October 2021	155,000
The first sets of dates commence and Louis is determined to make a good impression on Roxy. As sparks fly between Jay and Bethan, she struggles with the concept of catching feelings again. Elsewhere Nathan chooses Niko for a date despite admitting to having a deeper connection with Devon, and Amelia’s arrival pleases Ryan. Just as the new single housemates begin to settle in a further three bombshells arrive, and the OGs are forced to decide whose dating journey to cut short in order to make space for them.
188	3	"Chloe Shoots Her Hot"	19 October 2021	166,000
Jack, Niko and Robyn’s time in the house comes to an abrupt end following a shock twist, whilst Louis wastes no time in getting to know newbie Jade. Nathanial calls Nathan out for playing both him and Devon, meanwhile Charlie pulls out all the stops to impress Abbie when he realises he may have competition in Brandon. Bethan’s not impressed to be used as a pawn in Nathanial’s scheme to make Nathan jealous, and Charlie loses out to Brandon in the race for Abbie. A further three new singles join the party, meaning another brutal decision must be made.
189	4	"Return of the Mac"	26 October 2021	183,000
The game is over for Charlie, India and Ryan as they’re sent packing. Chloe F and Jade compete for Louis, and a spanner is thrown in the works when James is sent on a date with Molly. Jay fears he’s lost his connection with Bethan, just as Abbie’s grows with Brandon. Elsewhere, Darcy’s misunderstanding causes Nathanial to explode. With Chloe F admitting she’s smitten with Louis, she’s rocked by the arrival of her ex-boyfriend Marty. Roxy marks her territory with James, Jade feels disrespected, and Marty successfully drives a wedge between Chloe F and Louis.
190	5	"Kiss Louis Goodbye"	2 November 2021	119,000
Nathanial and Darcy clear the air, whilst Chloe F is drawn to Marty once again. The original boys are given the power in sending two people home, and their decision to choose Brandon and Darcy leaves Abbie fuming. Two more singles set pulses racing, Louis pours his heart out to Chloe F unaware her heart lies with Marty instead, and Ant is racked with guilt after pursuing Molly but kissing Jade. James and Roxy take their relationship to the next step, meanwhile Jade confesses to Molly about her kiss with Ant, and Chloe F has a moment of weakness with Marty.
191	6	"Just A Kiss?"	9 November 2021	146,000
It’s the morning after the night before and Chloe F wakes up full of regret following her kiss with Marty. Amelia is disappointed to hear that Robbie hasn’t been entirely honest with her, Devon is unfazed by Nathan and Nathanial’s close bond, and Molly is envious of Ant’s date with Ruby. Louis hits the roof when he discovers Chloe F’s betrayal, and Bethan is stuck in the middle of the warring pair. Elsewhere Kelsey and Harrison’s arrival means another tough decision has to be made as the girls must elect three people to send home.
192	7	"Unfinished Business"	16 November 2021	103,000
It’s curtains for Jay, Nathanial and Robbie as their time in the house is cut short. Kelsey admits she’s attracted to Louis but is wary of his past with Chloe F. Molly’s not impressed to hear that Ant has attempted to kiss Kelsey on their date, and Chloe F is finally honest with Louis about her feelings towards Marty. Nathan is spoilt for choice following Devon and Harrison’s intention to win his heart, and Louis and Marty fail to see eye to eye. Elsewhere the gang are sent for a night on the town, but not before another savage eviction.
193	8	"Out Out"	23 November 2021	103,000
Aaron and Jade’s quest for love comes to end as the OGs decide their fate. Marty wastes no time in letting Kelsey know about Louis’s comment towards Chloe F about their unfinished business, meanwhile another set of singles arrive meaning business. Tempers flare as Louis and Marty go head to head, and Kelsey realises she may have a love rival in Anya. Roxy celebrates her birthday in style with a Geordie house party, Chloe A catches the eye of Ant, Louis and Bethan, whilst Marty risks his relationship with Chloe F by kissing Kelsey.
194	9	"Make Or Break"	30 November 2021	137,000
Molly packs her bags after being rejected one too many times by Ant, meanwhile Amelia is stunned by Josh’s cold behaviour towards her. Chloe F considers getting back together with Marty unaware he’s racked with guilt following his kiss with Kelsey. Nathan realises it’s time for an honest conversation with Devon regarding his feelings for Harrison, and Chloe F understands she’s had a lucky escape in the wake of Marty’s confession. As the power lies in their hands, Bethan and Louis clash over who they feel should be sent home next.
195	10	"End of the Road"	7 December 2021	68,000
Devon is sent home by Bethan, who believed him being in the house could be a hindrance to Nathan progressing with Harrison. Abbie refuses to let Josh put a wedge between her and Amelia, and Ant believes he can be happy with Chloe A on the outside. The group celebrate their last night together by hosting a white party, where Louis makes a move on Kelsey, and Nathan and Harrison finally get cosy. Believing he was successful in finding love, James asks Roxy to be his girlfriend, whilst Chloe F leaves with Marty but not before clearing the air with Louis.

=== Series 23 (2022) ===
No. overall	No. in season	Title	Original release date
196	1	"Let's Get Together!"	20 September 2022
To celebrate over 10 years of Geordie Shore, Charlotte, Holly and Sophie hold a baby shower for Marnie, where they plan a reunion party. But is arranging a party really a good idea?.
197	2	"The Reunion Begins"	27 September 2022
Charlotte, Holly, Sophie and Marnie's plan of a big Geordie Reunion comes together! Cast past and present descend on the Toon for the big night but, does everyone turn up?.
198	3	"The Reunion Continues"	4 October 2022
The Geordie Shore Reunion continues with more shock arrivals bouncing through the door. Some Geordies will meet for the first time in years, some will make up, some will be able to move on and some will never speak again.
199	4	"The Geordies Invade Portugal!"	11 October 2022
The Reunion and Chloe and Bethan's argument reaches a climactic end. The gang land in Portugal for a family holiday! What blasts from the past are jumping on the next flight to the Algarve?.
200	5	"Trouble On The Horizon!"	18 October 2022
Chloe Ferrys shock arrival causes a massive ripple affect across the whole group! Nathan tries to smooth over tensions by taking the girls off to a spiritual retreat.
201	6	"Holly's Hen Do"	25 October 2022
Louis' arrival causes drama for the Geordies. Charlotte and Sophie throw Holly a surprise Hen Do on a boat! Someone else unexpectedly turns up at the villa, which will cause shockwaves throughout the Algarve!.
202	7	"The Answer to the Big Question"	1 November 2022
As the trip to the Algarve comes to an end. Louis action’s continue to cause drama amongst the Geordie’s and Holly finally gets some answers to the question everyone has been wondering!.
203	8	"The Pitter Patter Of Wedding Bells!"	8 November 2022
Marnie and Casey welcome a new arrival to their family! Elsewhere, another monumental day looms and the Geordies are in Ibiza gearing up for Holly's wedding day!.
204	9	"Back on the Toon"	15 November 2022
The Geordies are back in Newcastle for a night on the Toon! Who will show up and after all the recent drama will it be a Night to remember for all the right or wrong reasons?
205	10	"The Reunion Finale"	22 November 2022
It's time for one final house party at the Geordie Shore House to bring the Reunion to a close. As the group prepare to say goodbye, will it all be on good terms or is there still issues from the past that need to be faced?

=== Series 24 (2024) ===
No. overall	No. in season	Title	Original release date
206	1	"The Geordie's Are Back!"	9 January 2024
207	2	"The Big Day!"	9 January 2024
208	3	"Ground Rules"	16 January 2024
209	4	"Mams at War!"	23 January 2024
210	5	"Will She Stay or Will She Go?"	30 January 2024
211	6	"Mam's to the Rescue"	6 February 2024
212	7	"A Case of the Ex"	13 February 2024
213	8	"Carnage and Closure!"	20 February 2024
214	9	"Back to the Toon"	27 February 2024
215	10	"New Beginnings"	5 March 2024

=== Series 25 (2025) ===
No. overall	No. in season	Title	Original release date
216	1	"Geordie Shore, Thai-Aye!"	7 January 2025
217	2	"Sun, Sea & Scotty-T!"	7 January 2025
218	3	"Trouble in Paradise!"	14 January 2025
219	4	"It's a Family Affair"	21 January 2025
220	5	"Full Moon Carnage"	28 January 2025
221	6	"A Decent Proposal"	4 February 2025
222	7	"Will She, Won't She?"	11 February 2025
223	8	"Ko Samui Kick Off"	18 February 2025
224	9	"What Did You Call Me?!"	25 February 2025
225	10	"Never Say Never!"	4 March 2025

=== Series 26 (2026) ===
No. overall	No. in season	Title	Original release date
226	1	"Lisbon Baby!"	13 January 2026
227	2	"Geordie Tour Why Aye"	20 January 2026
228	3	"Did Someone Order Gary Beadle?"	27 January 2026
229	4	"Beadle's Back!"	3 February 2026
230	5	"Chloes Dirty Thirtieth"	10 February 2026
231	6	"Spill the Tea!"	17 February 2026
232	7	"Back to Nature!"	24 February 2026
233	8	"Gary The Second Coming"	3 March 2026
234	9	"Peace At Last!"	10 March 2026
235	10	"Births, Brides and Bye-byes!"	17 March 2026

== Specials ==
Title	Original release date	Viewers (millions)
"The Reunion (Series 1)"	5 July 2011	0.406
Russell Kane presents as the cast reunite to discuss all the goings on. Charlotte and Gaz are put in an awkward situation when they're questioned about their relationship, Vicky and Jay face a grilling from the audience, and Holly's shocked when Dan appears as a special guest.
"Best Bits (Series 1)"	12 July 2011	0.176
A look back at the best bits from the first series.
"The Reunion (Series 2)"	27 March 2012	0.304
Russell Kane presents as the cast of Geordie Shore reunite to discuss the series. Charlotte and Gaz are faced with questions about their on/off relationship again, whilst Vicky's forced to discuss what really happened in the final stages of her relationship with Dan. Rebecca and Vicky also admit their differences, and James is embarrassed by questions about Holly.
"Best Bits (Series 2)"	3 April 2012	TBA
A look back at the best bits from the series.
"Best Bits (Series 3)"	21 August 2012	0.423
A look back at the best bits from the series.
"Top 10 Moments (Series 3)"	28 August 2012	0.135
A countdown of the top ten moments from the series.
"Best Bits (Series 5)"	16 April 2013	0.386
A look back at the best bits from the series.
