= Two Mile Flat =

Locality and ghost town, in New South Wales, Australia

- Town
- Coordinates: 32°24′38.0″S 149°22′39.0″E
- Country: Australia
- State: New South Wales
- Region: Central West
- LGA: Mid-Western Regional Council
- Location: 301 km (187 mi) NW of Sydney; 18.9 km (11.7 mi) SW of Gulgong; 37.1 km (23.1 mi) NW of Mudgee

Government
  - State electorate: Dubbo
  - Federal division: Calare
- Elevation: 422 m (1,385 ft)

Population
  - Total: 59 (2021 census)
- Postcode: 2852
- County: Wellington
- Parish: Biraganbil
Localities around Two Mile Flat
| Goolma | Mebul | Gulgong |
| Goolma | Two Mile Flat | Guntawang |
| Twelve Mile | Piambong | Cullenbone |

Two Mile Flat is a rural locality in the Central West region of New South Wales, Australia. It is part of the geographical region known as the Central Tablelands. There once was a mining village of the same name there, which also had the official name of Warburton.

The area now known as Two Mile Flat lies on the traditional lands of Wiradjuri people.

Gold and diamonds were mined from alluvial deposits at Two Mile Flat, from around 1867. A disastrous flood in 1870 wrecked most of the diamond mining equipment, bringing large scale mining to an end. It was reported that in the first five months of operation, around 2,500 diamonds were found, and later 'several thousand more'. A sample of 1,013 diamonds averaged 0.23 carats. The largest diamond recorded on the field was "a colourless perfect octahedron, weighing 5 5/8 carats".

A site for a village known as Warburton was reserved in 1869, but it became better known as Two Mile Flat. The small village was located close to the left bank of Two Mile Flat Creek, not far from its confluence with Cudgegong River, It was at a crossroads, on what is now Goolma Road. Although the diggings may have had a population of around 2,000, in 1868-1869, and there were several hotels, the permanent village never grew much; miners largely abandoned the area, once richer goldfields were found at Gulgong (April 1870) and Apple Tree Flat. Nothing of the village remains today.

On the right bank side of the Cudgegong, across the Yamble Bridge, in part of what is now the locality of Goolma, there was once another small settlement known as Yamble. Yamble had a post office, and it had a hotel, from around 1899 to around 1932. There is nothing remaining of the settlement now.

In 1900, butcher's shop at Two Mile Flat was destroyed in a storm. In 1901, there was renewed interest in recovering gold, diamonds and sapphires using a gold dredge, but this seems not to have occurred.

A school, initially known as Warburton, opened in 1882. It was renamed Two Mile Flat, in 1895, and closed in 1933. The school was located to the west of the village, along what is now Goolma Road; it probably also served neighbouring Yamble. There was once a post office (closed 1980), hotel, and police station there.

The land in the locality is mainly cleared and used for grazing and crop raising.
