= Goolma, New South Wales =

Village in New South Wales, Australia

Coordinates: 32°23′S 149°16′E

Goolma is a tiny Hamlet community in the Central West of New South Wales, Australia. It is located on the Goolma road, which links the towns of Mudgee, Gulgong and Wellington. The name is also used for the surrounding area, for postal and statistical purposes. At the 2021 census, the Goolma region had a population of 95 people.

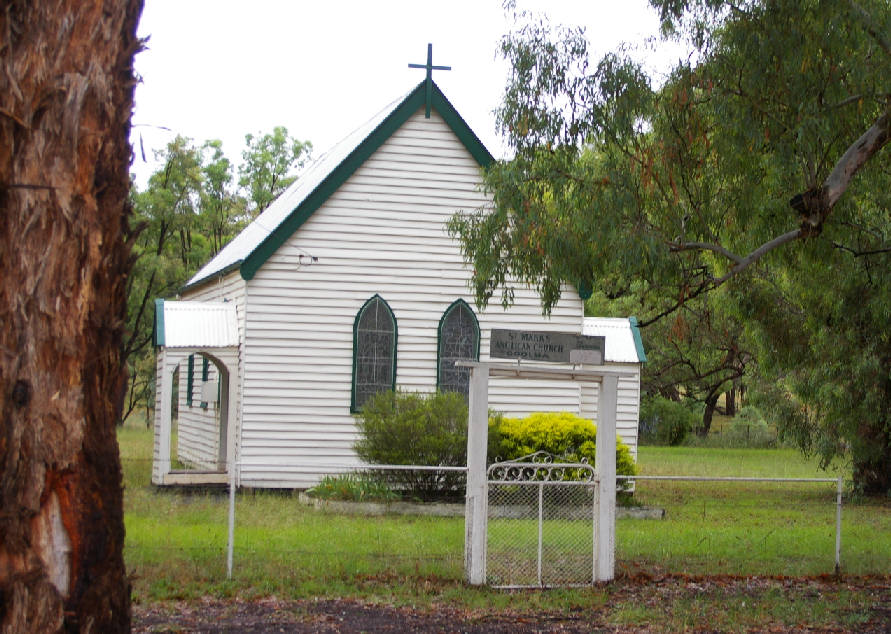
Anglican Church

Inside the Hamlet, there are a few tennis courts, a roadhouse (closed), a used car dealership (closed), former Anglican and Roman Catholic churches (closed) and the Goolma Hotel (closed).

Most of the surrounding area of Goolma is agricultural, with farmers producing cereals, wool, cattle and lambs.

Near Goolma was the Belara Copper Mine (closed), which operated from 1880 to at least 1908.

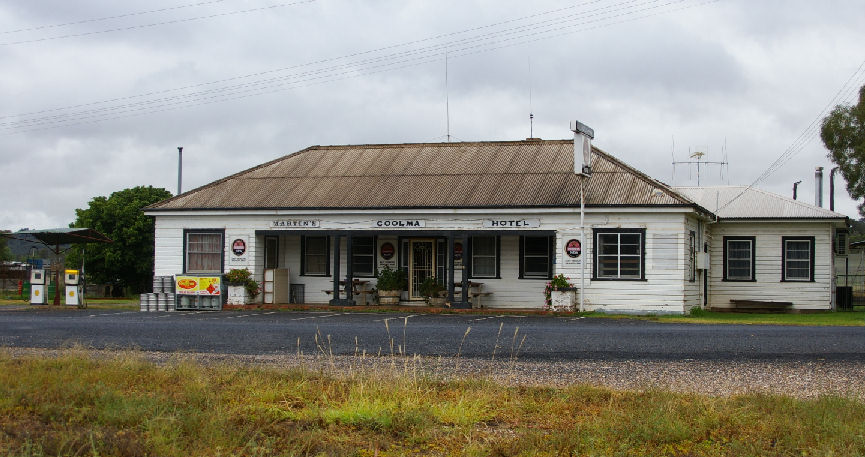
Goolma Hotel

Goolma was intended to be served by a cross-country railway line running from Sandy Hollow to Mary Vale, but work was stopped in 1950 and the line was never completed. An abandoned tunnel and unfinished bridges and embankments are landmarks to the abandoned line.

The small Goolma Public School which was founded in 1875 has nine (9) students and competes in the regional sports carnivals.

Goolma had a rugby union team (non existing) up until the 1990s called the "Polar Bears", but with most of the village either moving or aging, the team eventually atrophied and is no longer competing.

The Goolma Cricket Club has had a team since 1906 and currently competes in the Gulgong area.

The Tennis club holds a weekly night competition during the summer months and no longer holds monthly tournaments for the rest of the year.

Nine Network presenter, Tim Sheridan was raised outside Goolma, with his older brothers playing for the Polar Bears.

Also, former Sydney Roosters forward Daniel Conn was raised near Goolma. After receiving a sports scholarship to The King's School, Parramatta, Conn was contracted by the Canterbury Bulldogs until he was offered a new contract with the Gold Coast Titans. He finished his NRL playing career at the Sydney Roosters.
