= Daniel Conn =

Australian rugby league footballer

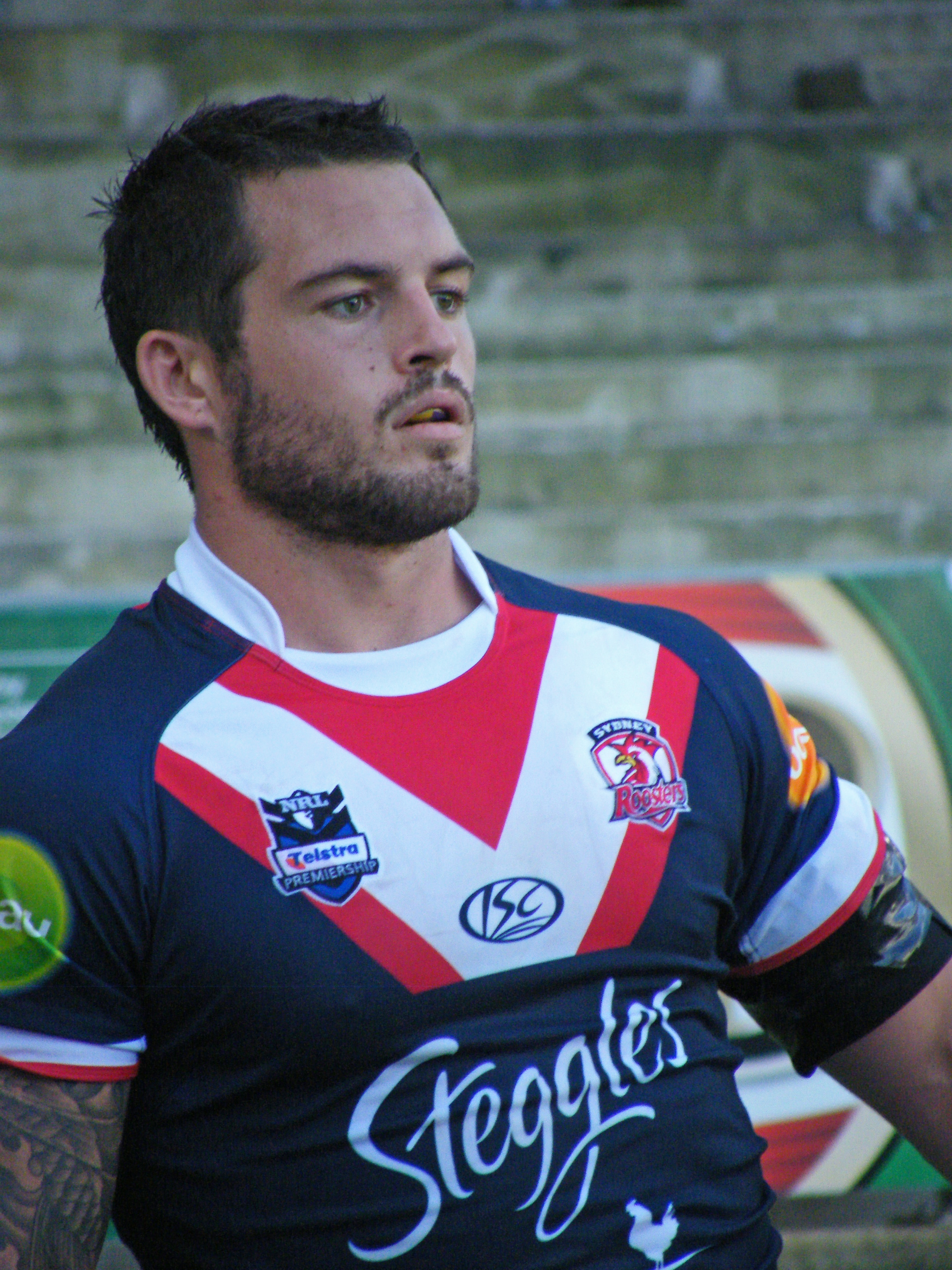

Personal information
- Full name: Daniel William Conn
- Born: 14 February 1986 (age 40) Goolma, New South Wales, Australia

Playing information
- Height: 185 cm (6 ft 1 in)
- Weight: 109 kg (17 st 2 lb)
- Position: Lock, Second-row
Club
Years	Team	Pld	T	G	FG	P
2005–06	Canterbury Bulldogs	3	0	0	0	0
2007–09	Gold Coast Titans	28	1	0	0	4
2010–11	Sydney Roosters	28	1	0	0	4
	Total	59	2	0	0	8

Daniel William Conn (born 14 February 1986) is an Australian model and former professional rugby league footballer. He played in the second-row for several clubs in the NRL.

== Playing career ==
Conn was a Wellington Cowboys & St Johns Dubbo junior. Conn made his first grade debut for Canterbury in round 11 of the 2005 NRL season against Melbourne. In 2007, Conn joined the Gold Coast and was an inaugural squad member in the clubs first year.

The Sydney Roosters signed Conn in 2010. Conn played in the Sydney Roosters 2010 NRL Grand Final loss against St. George Illawarra. In 2011 he was forced to retire at age 25 due to spinal cord injuries.

== Controversies ==
=== Michael Weyman incident ===
In round 4, 2008, while playing for the Gold Coast Titans Conn vigorously tackled then-Canberra Raiders forward Michael Weyman with a swinging arm. Weyman reacted poorly and threw punches after the play the ball, breaking Conn's nose. Conn was forced off the field through the blood rule, and Weyman was sent off and banned for six matches.

The two went head to head again in the 2010 NRL Grand Final when Conn, playing for the Sydney Roosters, was booked for a high shot on the then-St. George Illawarra forward.

=== Painkiller prescription fraud ===
In 2008 Conn was castigated by a magistrate, fined $5000 and ordered to do community service after admitting to faking painkiller prescriptions. The court was told he was charged after presenting a bogus prescription for the drugs Valium and Tramal at a Gold Coast pharmacy. Suspicious pharmacy staff contacted the doctor noted on the prescription who said the document was false. The pharmacist refused to fill the script and alerted police.

Police prosecutor Mark Williams said investigations revealed Conn, who refused to be interviewed by police, had presented another false prescription to the same pharmacy the previous year.

=== Gym incidents ===
On 19 September 2020, Conn was convicted in a Sydney court after pleading guilty to three charges relating to incidents involving a gym in Sydney's Eastern Suburbs. Conn pleaded guilty to destroying property, intimidation and breaching an apprehended violence order and was sentenced to an aggregate 14-month conditional release order. It was reported to the court that Conn threw a rock at the window of the Hustle Boxing gym in Potts Point in December in 2019. Conn used to work at the venue before quitting in 2019. Conn returned days later and, when told he was not welcome at the gym, reportedly told staff “you don’t know what will happen next”. This prompted a personal violence order to be taken out against him with Conn being banned from going within 100 metres of the gym.

== Retirement ==
In round 12 of the 2011 NRL season, Conn received a major neck injury which needed major surgery to have his spine fused. A week later he was told that there was a high possibility that if he continued with his career that he may not see the future. Even though he retired at the age of 25, he believed it was the best choice.

Conn starred in series 6 of Geordie Shore where the gang travelled to Australia, he was dating Geordie Shore housemate Vicky Pattison and was known as 'Fit Dan' on the show. He has also appeared on the reality TV show Ex On The Beach, where he is introduced as Vicky Pattison's ex.
