= The Challenge: Total Madness =

35th season of the reality television series

Total Madness
- Season 35
- Presented by: T. J. Lavin
- No. of contestants: 28
- Winners: Jenny West; Johnny "Bananas" Devenanzio
- Location: Prague, Czech Republic; Central Eastern Alps, Austria
- No. of episodes: 18 (including the Reunion and the Behind-the-scenes specials)

Release
- Original network: MTV
- Original release: April 1 – July 29, 2020

Season chronology
- ← Previous; War of the Worlds 2 Next → Double Agents

The Challenge: Total Madness is the thirty-fifth season of the MTV reality competition series The Challenge. This season features alumni from The Real World, Are You the One?, Big Brother, Celebrity Big Brother UK, The Amazing Race, Survivor, Geordie Shore, Ex on the Beach (US and UK), Shipwrecked, and Survival of the Fittest competing for a share at a $1 million prize. The season premiered on April 1, 2020, and concluded its run on July 29 of the same year with the Reunion and the Behind-the-scenes specials.

== Format ==
The cast of the thirty-fifth season of The Challenge, along with host T.J. Lavin

Total Madness features a main challenge, a nomination process, and an elimination round.

- Daily Challenge: Players compete in the main challenge either individually, in pairs, or in teams. For individual and paired challenges, the two winning players select one additional player to form the Tribunal. For team challenges, all members of the winning team form the Tribunal.
- Nominations: Players not in the Tribunal participate in nominations and must nominate one player of the designated gender to compete in the elimination round. They are given a chance to discuss the nominations before voting in an open vote. The player who receives the most votes will participate in the elimination round.
- Tribunal: Following nominations, the Tribunal selects three players of the designated gender to interrogate. One of these three chosen interrogated competitors will be selected for possible elimination. At the Purgatory, the tribunal individually votes for the second player to participate in the elimination. From Episode 2, a Tribunal member of the designated gender may volunteer for elimination, instead of voting for an interrogated competitor.
- Eliminations (Purgatory): The player selected by nomination participates in an elimination round against the player selected by the Tribunal, or the volunteer from the Tribunal. The loser is eliminated while the winner receives a Red Skull and remains in the game. The Red Skull is required to participate in the Final Challenge and can only be earned by winning in a Purgatory elimination round.

Twists

- Red Skull: Winning an elimination round earns a player a Red Skull, a requirement to compete in the Final Challenge. This twist was introduced after the first elimination.
- Double Elimination: Two slight variations of the Double Elimination occurred during this season.
  - Episodes 8 and 9 featured a male and female Double Elimination round respectively. Two players of the designated gender were eliminated. At nominations, the house voted two players of the designated gender into elimination. The tribunal then interrogated four nominees of the assigned gender, two of which they would vote into the Elimination Round should no tribunal member volunteer.
  - In episodes 14 and 15, one female and one male player were eliminated. The house voted one player of each gender into elimination. The tribunal then interrogated two nominees of each gender and would vote one male and one female into elimination, should no tribunal member volunteer.

== Contestants ==
| Male contestants | Original season | Finish |
|---|---|---|
| Johnny "Bananas" Devenanzio | The Real World: Key West | Winner |
| Kyle Christie | Geordie Shore 8 | Runner-up |
| Cory Wharton | Real World: Ex-Plosion | Third place |
| Faysal "Fessy" Shafaat | Big Brother 20 | Fourth place |
| Rogan O'Connor | Ex on the Beach UK 2 | Fifth place |
| Nelson Thomas | Are You the One? 3 | Episode 15 |
| Josh Martinez | Big Brother 19 | Episode 14 |
| Christopher "Swaggy C" Williams | Big Brother 20 | Episode 12 |
| Wes Bergmann | The Real World: Austin | Episode 10 |
| Stephen Bear | Celebrity Big Brother UK 18 | Episode 8 |
| Jordan Wiseley | The Real World: Portland | Episode 8 |
| Jay Starrett | Survivor: Millennials vs. Gen X | Episode 6 (Note: Jay suffered a concussion during the first round of the "Fire Ball" elimination and was deemed medically unable to continue. Rogan was declared the winner by default.) |
| Chris "CT" Tamburello | The Real World: Paris | Episode 3 |
| Asaf Goren | So You Think You Can Dance 12 | Episode 1 |

| Female contestants | Original season | Finish |
|---|---|---|
| Jenny West | Survival of the Fittest | Winner |
| Kaycee Clark | Big Brother 20 | Runner-up |
| Bayleigh Dayton | Big Brother 20 | Third place (Note: During the Final Challenge, Bayleigh injured her knee and deemed herself unable to continue. She withdrew from the Final Challenge during the Overnight Stage.) |
| Melissa Reeves | Ex on the Beach UK 2 | Fourth place (Note: Melissa volunteered to participate in the mid-final 'Knockout' elimination. However, prior to the beginning of the elimination, she withdrew after she felt that she was unable to finish the Final Challenge due to mental and physical exhaustion. Kaycee was declared the winner by default.) |
| Dee Nguyen | Geordie Shore 17 | Episode 15 |
| Aneesa Ferreira | The Real World: Chicago | Episode 14 |
| Nany Gonzalez | The Real World: Las Vegas (2011) | Episode 13 |
| Mattie Lynn Breaux | Party Down South | Episode 11 |
| Jenna Compono | Real World: Ex-Plosion | Episode 9 |
| Kailah Casillas | Real World: Go Big or Go Home | Episode 9 |
| Tula "Big T" Fazakerley | Shipwrecked: Battle of the Islands | Episode 9 (Note: Prior to the "Tunnel Rats" challenge in Episode 9, Big T was medically removed from the competition due to suffering a split toe in the previous episode.) |
| Tori Deal | Are You the One? 4 | Episode 7 |
| Ashley Mitchell | Real World: Ex-Plosion | Episode 4 |
| Jenn Lee | The Amazing Race 29 | Episode 2 |

== Gameplay ==
=== Challenge games ===
- Battle Lines: Played in male and female rounds, contestants must pull a barrel of medical supplies across a field, solving a math problem and puzzle along the way. At intervals, players who fall behind are eliminated from the challenge by having their barrel run over by a tank. The first player in each heat to reach the end of the field wins.
  - Winners: Jenny and Rogan
- Airdrop Extraction: Played in nine teams of three, teams must transfer 15 military crates from one missile launch platform to another, one mile apart. The first three teams to finish advance to Round Two. In Round Two, teams board a helicopter and must drop nine military crates from the helicopter, aiming to hit the missile launch platform. The team with the most hits wins.
  - Winners: Cory, Dee and Swaggy C
- Decode and Detonate: Each player begins at a puzzle board with a code. They must race to two separate puzzle keys to obtain the key to their code before returning to solve the code. Once the puzzle is solved, players race to a detonator and blow up a truck. The first two players to detonate a truck win.
  - Winners: Bayleigh and CT
- Cold War: Played in five teams of five, three players from each team must collect puzzle pieces from the bottom of a pool before solving the puzzle. Meanwhile, two players from an opposing team break an ice block to send ice into the pool, making the water colder for those collecting pieces. The team with the fastest time wins.
  - Winners: Aneesa, Bananas, Bear, Big T and Kaycee
- Bomb Squad: Played in six teams of four, each team member has a specific role. The first player must ride in a stunt car and look for hidden numbers to form a math equation, communicating this to a second player via radio. The second player solves the equation and runs the answer to the third player, who decodes the puzzle and selects three corresponding rods. The third player run the rods to the fourth player, who places the rods in a detonator. If the rods are correct, the bomb detonates. The team with the fastest time wins.
  - Winners: Jenny, Josh, Kaycee and Swaggy C
- Fast & Furious: Inspired by scenes from the film F9. Played in male/female pairs, each pair is hooked to a moving semi-truck and tethered together. Two pairs play at a time, on opposite sides of the truck. They must collect ten magnetic puzzle pieces from the side of the truck, before returning to their puzzle board at the top and solving the puzzle. The pair with the fastest time wins.
  - Winners: Jordan and Nany
- Decontamination: Each player races through a room of foam towards a window, while wearing PPE, where a series of flashing lights are shown. They must memorize the series before returning to the entrance and replicating the sequence by placing colored discs around a pole. The male and female player with the fastest times win.
  - Winners: Mattie and Wes
- Tunnel Rats: Played in three teams of five and one team of four, with two teams playing at once. One at a time, team members slide down a chute into a tunnel and swim to retrieve puzzle pieces. Once they collect all five puzzle pieces, teams must run back to the entrance and solve the puzzle. The team with the fastest time wins.
  - Winners: Bayleigh, Cory, Dee, Nany and Wes
- Throne Off: Played in male and female rounds, players begin holding onto a missile above water. One at a time, they are asked a multiple-choice trivia question. If they answer correctly, they can assign a strike to another player while answering incorrectly self-incurs a strike. Players are eliminated if they receive two strikes, or fall after letting go of the missile. The last male and female player standing win. Additionally, both winners received a $5,000 cash prize, announced at the conclusion of the challenge.
  - Winners: Dee and Wes
- Flag Down: Two players of the same gender begin strapped on each side of a tank, with four players competing at once. As the tank drives through a course, they must collect as many flags as possible. Red flags are worth one point and white flags are worth ten points. The male and female with the most points win. At the conclusion of the challenge, it was announced that players who had worked together during the challenge were disqualified.
  - Winners: Josh and Melissa
  - Disqualified: Fessy, Jenny, Kyle, Nany, Nelson and Rogan
- Tanks-A-Lot: Played in five teams of three, teams transfer junk from a junkyard across a field and deposit it into a bin. At the end of an unspecified time period, the two teams that transfer the most weight advance to Round Two. In Round Two, each team member must pull a heavy sled across the field. The first team to pull all three sleds to the finish line wins.
  - Winners: Bayleigh, Dee and Fessy
- Bloc'd In: Played in two teams of seven. Similar to a slide puzzle, teams push a series of black cars forwards or backwards in order to release a red car. Once released, teams must push the red car past the finish line. The team with the fastest time wins.
  - Winners: Aneesa, Bananas, Cory, Jenny, Josh, Nany and Rogan
- Running Out of Time: Players must run to collect heavy material before returning to place it into an opponent's drum. After an extended time, a horn sounds, indicating that players have five minutes to return and pick up their drum. Players who do not return in time are disqualified. Afterwards, the male and female player to hold their drum up the longest wins.
  - Winners: Fessy and Jenny
- Crash Course: Similar to bowling, one player begins in a stunt car and must crash the car into piles of barrels which other contestants are standing on. The male and female player who knock down the most barrels win. In the event of a tie, the winner is determined by how far their barrels travelled.
  - Winners: Bananas and Kaycee

=== Purgatory games ===
- Air Strike: Players begin hanging on to a bar above ground. Between them is a clear wall which they can kick to attempt to make their opponent drop from the bar. The first player to make their opponent release the bar twice wins.
  - Played by: Asaf vs. Jay
- Flip the Switch: Players begin on opposite sides of a hallway, each with ten barrels attached to poles. They must flip all ten barrels over the rail so that it lands on their opponent's side. The first player to flip all ten barrels and flip the switch at the end wins.
  - Played by: Jenn vs. Jenny
- Take Shelter: Players have 20 minutes to barricade the entrance to a bunker using provided materials. After those 20 minutes are up, players must attempt to break into their opponent's bunker, fully opening the door. The first player to break into the bunker and switch on the light wins.
  - Played by: Jay vs. CT
- Code Breaker: Players spin five wheels and must break hanging ceramic pots to find the corresponding tiles to the symbols that they spun, using a large die as a stepladder. After finding all five tiles, they flip the tiles over to reveal the names of five previous seasons of The Challenge. The first player to correctly place the seasons in chronological order wins.
  - Played by: Ashley vs. Dee
- Fire Ball: Each player is given three chances per round to deposit an ignited ball inside a barrel, located in the middle of a large circle. If a player is either knocked out of or steps out of the ring, or if the ball is knocked out of the ring, their ball is considered "dead." Players alternate between offense and defense in each round. The player who scores three points wins, with each ball being worth a point.
  - Played by: Jay vs. Rogan
- Dust to Dust: Players must take bricks up a ramp and smash them through a grate so that the debris falls into a wheelbarrow underneath. They then use the wheelbarrow to transfer the debris into a container and continue until enough debris is collected to reach a designated height level. The first player to reach the designated height wins.
  - Played by: Jenna vs. Tori
- Pole Wrestle: Players begin in the center of a circle and place both hands on a metal pole. The first contestant to wrestle the pole out of their opponent's hands twice wins.
  - Played by: Fessy vs. Jordan, Nelson vs. Bear
- Bombs Away: Players begin in a bin with one hundred "bombs." They must unload all one hundred bombs from the bin before detonating a smoke bomb. The first player to ignite their smoke bomb wins.
  - Played by: Kaycee vs. Kailah, Aneesa vs. Jenna
- Charge the Wall: Players must break through boxes of a wall to climb the wall and find batteries inside the boxes. The first player to find all three batteries wins.
  - Played by: Bananas vs. Wes
- Tunnel Vision: Players begin at one end of a locked tunnel filled with dirt. They must dig through the dirt to reach the other end to escape. The first player to escape their tunnel and ring the bell wins.
  - Played by: Dee vs. Mattie
- Launch Button: Players begin harnessed to opposite sides of a container. Each side has twenty buttons that correspond to a light. They must swing and press all twenty buttons to switch on every light. However, pressing a button twice turns the light off. The first player to light up all twenty lights wins.
  - Played by: Cory vs. Swaggy C
- Off With Your Heads: Players wear a jumpsuit with five mini red skulls placed on various parts of the body. The first player to pull off all five skulls from their opponent's jumpsuit and place them on their podium wins.
  - Played by: Melissa vs. Nany
- Knots of War: Players have 15 minutes to create as many knots as they can using rope within a car. After those 15 minutes are up, players switch places and must untie their opponent's knots. The first player to untie all of their opponent's knots and bring the rope outside of the circle wins.
  - Played by: Aneesa vs. Bayleigh, Josh vs. Kyle
- Hall Brawl: Players must run through a narrow hallway past their opponent and ring a bell. The player who rings the bell first twice wins.
  - Played by: Dee vs. Jenny, Nelson vs. Rogan

=== Final Challenge ===
Checkpoint One: Players must ski over towards a pile of logs. They can take up to three logs before skiing across a valley towards a skull monument to deposit the logs. Once a player has collected twelve logs, they must ignite a fuse and light up their monument before proceeding to the end of the checkpoint. Unbeknownst to the players, the first male and female player to finish the checkpoint form the final Tribunal of the season, ahead of an Instant Elimination.

- Tribunal: Cory and Jenny

The Journey: All nine players must traverse a via ferrata together to reach a compound at the top of a mountain, crossing a tightrope along the way. Once they reach the compound, players not in the Tribunal must select one male and one female to participate in an Instant Elimination. The Tribunal then select the second male and female contestant for the Instant Elimination.

Instant Elimination - Knockout: Players start at opposite ends of a ring and must race to ring a hanging bell in the middle before their opponent. The player to ring the bell first twice, wins.

- Played By: Bananas vs. Rogan
- Eliminated: Melissa (4th place - quit), Rogan (5th place)

Overnight Stage: Both Tribunal members and both winners of the Instant Elimination are rewarded with a warm room to sleep inside of the compound for the night. The remaining three players must spend six hours outside by a fire before being allowed inside of the compound.

- Eliminated: Bayleigh (3rd place - quit)

Final Push: Players follow a trail towards a glacier where the finish line is set up. Tribunal members have a two-minute headstart and the Instant Elimination winners have a one-minute headstart. Along the way, there are a series of math operations, the solution of which forms the combination to unlock a skull that they must smash before proceeding. The first male and female finalist to cross the finish line are declared the winners of Total Madness and receive $500,000 each.

- Winners: Bananas and Jenny
- Runners-up: Kaycee and Kyle
- Third place: Cory
- Fourth place: Fessy

== Game summary ==
| Episode | | Gender | Challenge type | Winners | Tribunal | Purgatory contestants | | | | | Purgatory game | Purgatory outcome | |
| # | Challenge | Gender | Challenge type | Winners | Tribunal | Voted In | Tribunal Picks | | | | Purgatory game | Winner | Eliminated |
|---|---|---|---|---|---|---|---|---|---|---|---|---|---|
| 1 | Battle Lines | Male | Individual | Rogan | Cory, Jenny, Rogan | Asaf | Jay | Kyle | Wes | —N/a | Air Strike | Jay | Asaf |
| 1 | Battle Lines | Male | Individual | Jenny | Cory, Jenny, Rogan | Asaf | Jay | Kyle | Wes | —N/a | Air Strike | Jay | Asaf |
| 2 | Airdrop Extraction | Female | 9 teams of 3 | Team 1 | Cory, Dee, Swaggy C | Jenn | Big T | Jenny | Tori | —N/a | Flip The Switch | Jenny | Jenn |
| 3 | Decode and Detonate | Male | Individual | CT | Bayleigh, CT, Swaggy C | Jay | Bear | Nelson | Rogan | —N/a | Take Shelter | Jay | CT |
| 3 | Decode and Detonate | Male | Individual | Bayleigh | Bayleigh, CT, Swaggy C | Jay | Bear | Nelson | Rogan | —N/a | Take Shelter | Jay | CT |
| 4 | Cold War | Female | 5 teams of 5 | Team 4 | Aneesa, Bananas, Bear, Big T, Kaycee | Ashley | Dee | Mattie | Tori | —N/a | Code Breaker | Dee | Ashley |
| 5/6 | Bomb Squad | Male | 6 teams of 4 | Team 4 | Jenny, Josh, Kaycee, Swaggy C | Jay | Nelson | Rogan | Wes | —N/a | Fire Ball | Rogan | Jay |
| 6/7 | Fast & Furious | Female | Male/Female pairs (Note: Due to an uneven number of male players, Jordan was randomly selected and competed twice in the "Fast & Furious" challenge.) | Jordan & Nany | Jenna, Jordan, Nany | Tori | Big T | Dee | Kailah | —N/a | Dust To Dust | Jenna | Tori |
| 8 | Decontamination | Male | Individual | Mattie | Bananas, Mattie, Wes | Fessy | Bear | Cory | Jordan | Kyle | Pole Wrestle | Fessy | Jordan |
| 8 | Decontamination | Male | Individual | Wes | Bananas, Mattie, Wes | Nelson | Bear | Cory | Jordan | Kyle | Pole Wrestle | Nelson | Bear |
| 9 | Tunnel Rats | Female | 3 teams of 5 & 1 team of 4 | Team 3 | Bayleigh, Cory, Dee, Nany, Wes | Kaycee | Jenna | Jenny | Kailah | Melissa | Bombs Away | Kaycee | Kailah |
| 9 | Tunnel Rats | Female | 3 teams of 5 & 1 team of 4 | Team 3 | Bayleigh, Cory, Dee, Nany, Wes | Aneesa | Jenna | Jenny | Kailah | Melissa | Bombs Away | Aneesa | Jenna |
| 10 | Throne Off | Male | Individual | Dee | Dee, Rogan, Wes | Bananas | Cory | Kyle | Swaggy C | —N/a | Charge the Wall | Bananas | Wes |
| 10 | Throne Off | Male | Individual | Wes | Dee, Rogan, Wes | Bananas | Cory | Kyle | Swaggy C | —N/a | Charge the Wall | Bananas | Wes |
| 11 | Flag Down | Female | Individual | Josh | Bananas, Josh, Melissa | Mattie | Bayleigh | Dee | Nany | —N/a | Tunnel Vision | Dee | Mattie |
| 11 | Flag Down | Female | Individual | Melissa | Bananas, Josh, Melissa | Mattie | Bayleigh | Dee | Nany | —N/a | Tunnel Vision | Dee | Mattie |
| 12 | Tanks-A Lot | Male | 5 teams of 3 | Team 5 | Bayleigh, Dee, Fessy | Cory | Josh | Kyle | Swaggy C | —N/a | Launch Button | Cory | Swaggy C |
| 13 | Bloc'd In | Female | 2 teams of 7 | Team 1 | Aneesa, Bananas, Cory, Jenny, Josh, Nany, Rogan | Melissa | Bayleigh | Dee | Kaycee | —N/a | Off With Your Heads | Melissa | Nany |
| 14 | Running Out of Time | Female | Individual | Jenny | Fessy, Jenny, Josh | Bayleigh | Aneesa | Melissa | —N/a | —N/a | Knots of War | Bayleigh | Aneesa |
| 14 | Running Out of Time | Male | Individual | Fessy | Fessy, Jenny, Josh | Kyle | Nelson | Rogan | —N/a | —N/a | Knots of War | Kyle | Josh |
| 15 | Crash Course | Female | Individual | Kaycee | Bananas, Kaycee, Kyle | Jenny | Bayleigh | Dee | —N/a | —N/a | Hall Brawl | Jenny | Dee |
| 15 | Crash Course | Male | Individual | Bananas | Bananas, Kaycee, Kyle | Rogan | Cory | Nelson | —N/a | —N/a | Hall Brawl | Rogan | Nelson |
| 16 | Final Challenge | —N/a | Individual | Bananas | 2nd place: Kyle; 3rd place: Cory; 4th place: Fessy; 5th place: Rogan | | | | | | | | |
| 16 | Final Challenge | —N/a | Individual | Jenny | 2nd place: Kaycee; 3rd place: Bayleigh; 4th place: Melissa | | | | | | | | |

=== Elimination progress ===
| Contestants | Episodes | | | | | | | | | | | | | | |
| Contestants | 1 | 2 | 3 | 4 | 5/6 | 6/7 | 8 | 9 | 10 | 11 | 12 | 13 | 14 | 15 | Finale |
|---|---|---|---|---|---|---|---|---|---|---|---|---|---|---|---|
| Jenny | WIN | ELIM | SAFE | SAFE | WIN | SAFE | SAFE | NOM | SAFE | SAFE | SAFE | WIN | WIN | ELIM | WINNER |
| Bananas | SAFE | SAFE | SAFE | WIN | SAFE | SAFE | HIGH | SAFE | ELIM | HIGH | SAFE | WIN | SAFE | WIN | WINNER |
| Kyle | NOM | SAFE | SAFE | SAFE | SAFE | SAFE | NOM | SAFE | NOM | SAFE | NOM | SAFE | ELIM | HIGH | SECOND |
| Kaycee | SAFE | SAFE | SAFE | WIN | WIN | SAFE | SAFE | ELIM | SAFE | SAFE | SAFE | NOM | SAFE | WIN | SECOND |
| Cory | HIGH | WIN | SAFE | SAFE | SAFE | SAFE | NOM | WIN | NOM | SAFE | ELIM | WIN | SAFE | NOM | THIRD |
| Bayleigh | SAFE | SAFE | WIN | SAFE | SAFE | SAFE | SAFE | WIN | SAFE | NOM | WIN | NOM | ELIM | NOM | THIRD |
| Fessy | SAFE | SAFE | SAFE | SAFE | SAFE | SAFE | ELIM | SAFE | SAFE | SAFE | WIN | SAFE | WIN | SAFE | FOURTH |
| Melissa | SAFE | SAFE | SAFE | SAFE | SAFE | SAFE | SAFE | NOM | SAFE | WIN | SAFE | ELIM | NOM | SAFE | FOURTH |
| Rogan | WIN | SAFE | NOM | SAFE | ELIM | SAFE | SAFE | SAFE | HIGH | SAFE | SAFE | WIN | NOM | ELIM | FIFTH |
| Nelson | SAFE | SAFE | NOM | SAFE | NOM | SAFE | ELIM | SAFE | SAFE | SAFE | SAFE | SAFE | NOM | OUT | |
| Dee | SAFE | WIN | SAFE | ELIM | SAFE | NOM | SAFE | WIN | WIN | ELIM | WIN | NOM | SAFE | OUT | |
| Josh | SAFE | SAFE | SAFE | SAFE | WIN | SAFE | SAFE | SAFE | SAFE | WIN | NOM | WIN | LOST | | |
| Aneesa | SAFE | SAFE | SAFE | WIN | SAFE | SAFE | SAFE | ELIM | SAFE | SAFE | SAFE | WIN | OUT | | |
| Nany | SAFE | SAFE | SAFE | SAFE | SAFE | WIN | SAFE | WIN | SAFE | NOM | SAFE | LOST | | | |
| Swaggy C | SAFE | WIN | HIGH | SAFE | WIN | SAFE | SAFE | SAFE | NOM | SAFE | OUT | | | | |
| Mattie | SAFE | SAFE | SAFE | NOM | SAFE | SAFE | WIN | SAFE | SAFE | OUT | | | | | |
| Wes | NOM | SAFE | SAFE | SAFE | NOM | SAFE | WIN | WIN | LOST | | | | | | |
| Jenna | SAFE | SAFE | SAFE | SAFE | SAFE | VOL | SAFE | OUT | | | | | | | |
| Kailah | SAFE | SAFE | SAFE | SAFE | SAFE | NOM | SAFE | OUT | | | | | | | |
| Big T | SAFE | NOM | SAFE | WIN | SAFE | NOM | SAFE | MED | | | | | | | |
| Bear | SAFE | SAFE | NOM | WIN | SAFE | SAFE | OUT | | | | | | | | |
| Jordan | SAFE | SAFE | SAFE | SAFE | SAFE | WIN | OUT | | | | | | | | |
| Tori | SAFE | NOM | SAFE | NOM | SAFE | OUT | | | | | | | | | |
| Jay | ELIM | SAFE | ELIM | SAFE | MED | | | | | | | | | | |
| Ashley | SAFE | SAFE | SAFE | OUT | | | | | | | | | | | |
| CT | SAFE | SAFE | LOST | | | | | | | | | | | | |
| Jenn | SAFE | OUT | | | | | | | | | | | | | |
| Asaf | OUT | | | | | | | | | | | | | | |

Competition
The contestant finished the final challenge and won
The contestant finished the final challenge and lost
The contestant was eliminated during the Final Challenge
The contestant won the challenge and was part of the tribunal
The contestant did not win the challenge, but was part of the tribunal
The contestant was not selected for the Purgatory
The contestant was nominated by the tribunal for interrogation, but was not selected for the Purgatory
The contestant won the Purgatory and earned a Red Skull
The contestant was part of the tribunal, volunteered for the Purgatory, won and earned a Red Skull
The contestant lost the Purgatory and was eliminated
The contestant was part of the tribunal, volunteered for the Purgatory, lost and was eliminated
The contestant was removed from the competition due to medical reasons
The contestant withdrew from the competition

== Voting progress ==
| House Vote | **Asaf**; 15 of 25 votes | **Jenn**; 20 of 24 votes | **Jay**; 8 of 23 votes | **Ashley**; 7 of 20 votes | **Jay**; 10 of 20 votes | **Tori**; 20 of 20 votes | **Fessy**; 6 of 19 votes | **Nelson**; 9 of 19 votes | **Kaycee**; 14 of 14 votes | **Aneesa**; 14 of 14 votes | **Bananas**; 14 of 14 votes | **Mattie**; 13 of 13 votes | **Cory**; 8 of 12 votes | **Melissa**; 4 of 7 votes | **Kyle**; 8 of 10 votes | **Bayleigh**; 8 of 10 votes | **Rogan**; 8 of 8 votes | **Jenny**; 4 of 8 votes | **Rogan** volunteered | **Melissa** volunteered |
| Tribunal's Vote | **Jay**; 3 of 3 votes | **Jenny**; 3 of 3 votes | **CT** volunteered | **Dee**; 5 of 5 votes | **Rogan**; 4 of 4 votes | **Jenna** volunteered | **Jordan**; 3 of 3 votes | **Bear**; 2 of 3 votes | **Kailah**; 4 of 5 votes | **Jenna**; 4 of 5 votes | **Wes** volunteered | **Dee**; 2 of 3 votes | **Swaggy C** 2 of 3 votes | **Nany** volunteered | **Josh** volunteered | **Aneesa**; 2 of 3 votes | **Nelson**; 3 of 3 votes | **Dee**; 3 of 3 votes | **Bananas**; 2 of 2 votes | **Kaycee**; 2 of 2 votes |
| Voter | Episodes | | | | | | | | | | | | | | | | | | | |
| Voter | 1 | 2 | 3 | 4 | 5 | 7 | 8 | | 9 | | 10 | 11 | 12 | 13 | 14 | | 15 | | Finale | |
| Bananas | Jay | Big T | Jay | **Dee** | Jay | Tori | **Jordan** | **Cory** | Kaycee | Aneesa | Bananas | **Dee** | Kyle | —N/a | Kyle | Bayleigh | **Nelson** | **Dee** | —N/a | —N/a |
| Jenny | **Jay** | Jenn | —N/a | Ashley | **Rogan** | Tori | —N/a | Nelson | Kaycee | Aneesa | Bananas | Mattie | Kyle | —N/a | —N/a | **Aneesa** | Rogan | Dee | **Bananas** | **Kaycee** |
| Kyle | Jay | Jenn | Jay | Ashley | Jay | Tori | Fessy | Nelson | Kaycee | Aneesa | Bananas | Mattie | Kyle | Melissa | Kyle | Bayleigh | **Nelson** | **Dee** | —N/a | —N/a |
| Kaycee | Asaf | Jenn | Nelson | **Dee** | **Rogan** | Tori | —N/a | —N/a | Kaycee | Aneesa | Bananas | Mattie | Cory | Melissa | Kyle | Bayleigh | **Nelson** | **Dee** | —N/a | —N/a |
| Cory | **Jay** | **Jenny** | Jay | —N/a | Bear | Tori | —N/a | Bear | **Kailah** | **Jenna** | Bananas | Mattie | Cory | —N/a | Kyle | Bayleigh | Rogan | Jenny | **Bananas** | **Kaycee** |
| Bayleigh | Asaf | Jenn | —N/a | —N/a | —N/a | Tori | —N/a | —N/a | **Kailah** | **Jenna** | Bananas | Mattie | **Swaggy C** | Bayleigh | Kyle | Bayleigh | Rogan | Melissa | —N/a | —N/a |
| Fessy | Asaf | Jenn | Bananas | —N/a | Bear | Tori | Bear | —N/a | Kaycee | Aneesa | Bananas | Mattie | **Swaggy C** | Bayleigh | —N/a | **Melissa** | Rogan | Dee | —N/a | —N/a |
| Melissa | Asaf | Jenn | Jay | Ashley | Jay | Tori | —N/a | Nelson | Kaycee | Aneesa | Bananas | **Bayleigh** | Kyle | Melissa | Kyle | Bayleigh | Rogan | Bayleigh | —N/a | Melissa |
| Rogan | **Jay** | Big T | Jay | —N/a | Jay | Tori | —N/a | —N/a | Kaycee | Aneesa | —N/a | Mattie | Cory | —N/a | —N/a | —N/a | Rogan | Jenny | Rogan | —N/a |
| Nelson | Asaf | Jenn | Bananas | —N/a | Bear | Tori | Bear | Bear | Kaycee | Aneesa | Bananas | Mattie | Cory | Bayleigh | Kyle | Bayleigh | Rogan | Jenny | | |
| Dee | Asaf | **Jenny** | Bananas | Ashley | Jay | Tori | —N/a | —N/a | **Kailah** | **Jenna** | —N/a | Mattie | **Kyle** | Melissa | —N/a | —N/a | Rogan | Jenny | | |
| Josh | Asaf | Jenn | Nelson | —N/a | **Rogan** | Tori | Nelson | Nelson | Kaycee | Aneesa | Bananas | **Dee** | Cory | —N/a | **Josh** | **Aneesa** | | | | |
| Aneesa | Asaf | Jenn | Jordan | **Dee** | —N/a | Tori | Nelson | Nelson | Kaycee | Aneesa | Bananas | Mattie | Cory | —N/a | Kyle | Bayleigh | | | | |
| Nany | Jay | Jenn | Nelson | Ashley | Jay | —N/a | Fessy | —N/a | **Jenny** | **Jenny** | Bananas | Mattie | Cory | **Nany** | | | | | | |
| Swaggy C | Asaf | **Jenny** | —N/a | —N/a | **Rogan** | Tori | —N/a | Nelson | Kaycee | Aneesa | Bananas | Mattie | Cory | | | | | | | |
| Mattie | Asaf | Jenn | —N/a | Ashley | Jay | Tori | **Jordan** | **Bear** | Kaycee | Aneesa | Bananas | Mattie | | | | | | | | |
| Wes | Asaf | Jenn | Jay | —N/a | Kyle | Tori | **Jordan** | **Bear** | **Kailah** | **Jenna** | **Wes** | | | | | | | | | |
| Jenna | Jay | Jenn | Nelson | —N/a | —N/a | **Jenna** | Fessy | —N/a | Kaycee | Aneesa | | | | | | | | | | |
| Kailah | Jay | Jenn | Nelson | —N/a | Jay | Tori | Fessy | Nelson | Kaycee | Aneesa | | | | | | | | | | |
| Big T | Asaf | Jenn | Bananas | **Dee** | —N/a | Tori | —N/a | Nelson | | | | | | | | | | | | |
| Bear | Asaf | Jenn | Jay | **Dee** | Jay | Tori | Fessy | Nelson | | | | | | | | | | | | |
| Jordan | Jay | Jenn | Jordan | —N/a | Jordan | —N/a | Fessy | Jordan | | | | | | | | | | | | |
| Tori | Jay | Jenn | Jay | Ashley | Jay | Tori | | | | | | | | | | | | | | |
| Jay | Asaf | Jenn | Bananas | —N/a | Bear | | | | | | | | | | | | | | | |
| Ashley | Asaf | Jenn | Bananas | —N/a | | | | | | | | | | | | | | | | |
| CT | Jay | Big T | **CT** | | | | | | | | | | | | | | | | | |
| Jenn | Jay | Big T | | | | | | | | | | | | | | | | | | |
| Asaf | Wes | | | | | | | | | | | | | | | | | | | |

- **Bold** indicates the contestant was in the Tribunal

== Team selections ==
Airdrop Extraction (Ep. 2)
| Team 1 | Team 2 | Team 3 |
|---|---|---|
| Cory | Jenny | Ashley |
| Dee | Jordan | Bear |
| Swaggy C | Wes | Jenna |
| Team 4 | Team 5 | Team 6 |
| Bayleigh | Big T | CT |
| Jenn | Mattie | Jay |
| Josh | Rogan | Kaycee |
| Team 7 | Team 8 | Team 9 |
| Aneesa | Kailah | Fessy |
| Bananas | Nelson | Kyle |
| Nany | Tori | Melissa |

Cold War (Ep. 4)
| Team 1 | Team 2 | Team 3 | Team 4 | Team 5 |
|---|---|---|---|---|
| Ashley | Dee | Jay | Aneesa | Bayleigh |
| Fessy | Jordan | Mattie | Bananas | Cory |
| Josh | Kailah | Melissa | Bear | Jenna |
| Nany | Nelson | Tori | Big T | Jenny |
| Rogan | Swaggy C | Wes | Kaycee | Kyle |

Bomb Squad (Ep. 5/6)
| Team 1 | Team 2 | Team 3 |
|---|---|---|
| Jay | Bananas | Big T |
| Kailah | Bear | Mattie |
| Nany | Dee | Nelson |
| Wes | Tori | Rogan |
| Team 4 | Team 5 | Team 6 |
| Jenny | Bayleigh | Aneesa |
| Josh | Cory | Fessy |
| Kaycee | Kyle | Jenna |
| Swaggy C | Melissa | Jordan |

Fast & Furious (Ep.6/7)
Jordan & Nany
Dee & Swaggy C
Big T & Kyle
Josh & Tori
Fessy & Jenna
Cory & Mattie
Aneesa & Nelson
Jenny & Rogan
Bananas & Melissa
Bear & Kaycee
Kailah & Wes
Bayleigh & Jordan

Tunnel Rats (Ep. 9)
| Team 1 | Team 2 | Team 3 | Team 4 |
|---|---|---|---|
| Fessy | Bananas | Bayleigh | Aneesa |
| Jenny | Jenna | Cory | Josh |
| Kaycee | Kyle | Dee | Kailah |
| Nelson | Melissa | Nany | Mattie |
| | Rogan | Wes | Swaggy C |

Tanks-A Lot (Ep. 12)
| Team 1 | Team 2 | Team 3 | Team 4 | Team 5 |
|---|---|---|---|---|
| Cory | Bananas | Aneesa | Nany | Bayleigh |
| Josh | Melissa | Jenny | Nelson | Dee |
| Kaycee | Rogan | Kyle | Swaggy C | Fessy |

Bloc'd In (Ep. 13)
| Team 1 | Team 2 |
|---|---|
| Aneesa | Bayleigh |
| Bananas | Dee |
| Cory | Fessy |
| Jenny | Kaycee |
| Josh | Kyle |
| Nany | Melissa |
| Rogan | Nelson |

== Episodes ==
| No. overall | No. in season | Title | Original release date | US viewers (millions) |
|---|---|---|---|---|
| 454 | 1 | "Mad World" | April 1, 2020 | 1.06 |
| 455 | 2 | "Sweet Dreams Are Made of Dee" | April 8, 2020 | 0.93 |
| 456 | 3 | "A Hard Jay's Night" | April 15, 2020 | 0.92 |
| 457 | 4 | "Karma Chameleon" | April 22, 2020 | 1.02 |
| 458 | 5 | "Break Up With Your BF, I'm Bored" | April 29, 2020 | 1.00 |
| 459 | 6 | "Love Will Tear Us Apart" | May 6, 2020 | 0.93 |
| 460 | 7 | "Should I Stay Or Should I Go?" | May 13, 2020 | 0.85 |
| 461 | 8 | "Live and Let Die" | May 20, 2020 | 1.02 |
| 462 | 9 | "Backstabber" | May 27, 2020 | 0.93 |
| 463 | 10 | "The Final Countdown" | June 3, 2020 | 0.91 |
| 464 | 11 | "You Ain't Right" | June 10, 2020 | 0.88 |
| 465 | 12 | "Pictures of You" | June 17, 2020 | 0.90 |
| 466 | 13 | "Victim of Love" | June 24, 2020 | 0.94 |
| 467 | 14 | "Your Time Is Gonna Come" | July 1, 2020 | 0.85 |
| 468 | 15 | "Crash Into Me" | July 8, 2020 | 0.94 |
| 469 | 16 | "It's the End of the World As We Know It" | July 15, 2020 | 0.98 |

=== Reunion special ===
The Reunion special aired on July 22, 2020, and was hosted by former NFL player Vernon Davis. Due to the COVID-19 pandemic, it was conducted by way of a Zoom chat. It was watched by 0.78 million viewers. A behind-the-scenes special, also hosted by Davis, aired on July 29, 2020, and was watched by 0.49 million viewers.

== Controversy ==
"As a result of Dee Nguyen's offensive comments about Black Lives Matter movement, MTV have severed ties with her. Out of respect for the competition and other Challengers, MTV will air the season as planned. Dee Nguyen will not appear in the reunion to be filmed at a later date. MTV strongly condemns systemic racism."

— Statement from MTV.

Following controversial comments about the Black Lives Matter movement on Twitter, during the airing of the season, MTV decided to cut ties with cast member Dee Nguyen on June 9, 2020. After the incident, Nguyen posted an apology on her social media, and was mostly edited out of the remaining episodes of the season.

On June 12, it was reported that Nguyen had hired a legal team and was considering taking legal action against MTV for firing her.
