= Celebrity Big Brother 2016 =

Celebrity Big Brother 2016 may refer to:

- Celebrity Big Brother 17
- Celebrity Big Brother 18
