= St Teresa's School Effingham =

St Teresa's Effingham
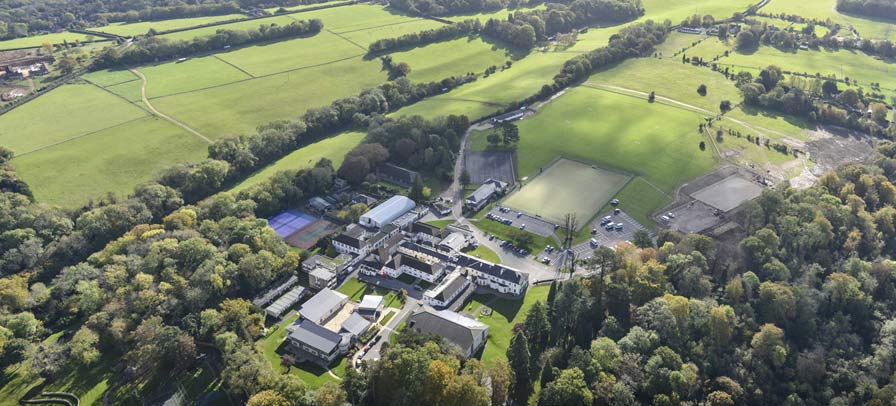
- St Teresa's Effingham MERGE Eastern entrance

Location
- Effingham, Surrey, RH5 6ST; England; 51°14′53″N 0°23′56″W

Information
- Type: Private day and boarding
- Motto: Gaudere et Bene Facere ("Rejoice and do well")
- Religious affiliation: Roman Catholic
- Established: 1928
- Founder: The Religious Order of Christian Instruction
- Department for Education URN: 125402 Tables
- Chair of Governors: Michael Bray
- Head: Mr Field
- Gender: Girls
- Houses: St. Benedict; St. Dominic; St. Ignatius; St. Francis
- Website: www.st-teresas.com

St Teresa's Effingham is a selective, independent boarding and day school for girls in Effingham, Surrey, England, established in 1928. It is a member of the Girls' Schools Association.

== History ==
In 1799, John Fuller built a mansion called Effingham Hill House on the site of another house which had been called Tibs, and this house now forms the centre of the senior school, and has been extended to provide modern facilities. In 1886 or somewhat later, Julius Caesar Czarnikow bought Effingham Hill House from Frederick Augustus Maxse, and owned it until he died in 1909. His daughter, Ada Louisa, sold it to Azalea Caroline Keyes, who in 1916 sold it to Robert Reitmeyer Calburn, who owned it until 1928. St Teresa's was founded in that house by the Religious Order of Christian Instruction (who also founded St Teresa's sister school Leweston School) in 1928 on what was originally part of a manor site recorded in the Domesday Book. The last headmistress nun retired in 1977. Since 2002, the school has been managed by a lay trust. Although there are no longer any religious sisters on staff (as of 2013–14 academic year), the school maintains its Catholic ethos and ties to the local parish, which is represented in the school's Board of Governors.

An all-weather pitch and swimming pool complex were completed in 2000 and 2003 respectively and, in September 2005 a performing arts theatre hall with music and drama suites was opened.

== Location ==
St Teresa's has 48 acres (0.19 km^{2}) of grounds in a designated area of outstanding natural beauty amid the Surrey Hills AONB, in a multi-crested section of the escarpment of the North Downs. In 1953 a separate preparatory school was established at Grove House, in the village centre of Effingham about a mile away and has since relocated to the main school site.

== Admissions ==
Entry to St. Teresa's is selective, and is based on an entrance examination with papers in English, Maths, Science and Verbal Reasoning. This does not preclude many students with special educational needs, who receive support in the school to help them through their studies, social interaction and exams.

== Cranmore School partnership ==
In May 2019, a prep school for boys, Cranmore, West Horsley, joined St Teresa's in the Effingham Schools Trust. The Trust plans to expand Cranmore into providing secondary education on its present site, with the two schools having a combined sixth form located at St Teresa's, from September 2025.

== Notable former pupils ==
Past pupils are known as STOGs (St Teresa's Old Girls)

- Lynne Reid Banks, former actress and author
- Lara Goodison, actress and Shipwrecked: Battle of the Islands 2008 contestant
- Ranjini Haridas, actress, model and Miss Kerala 2000 winner
- Natalie Coyle, classically trained soprano
