= Just Tattoo of Us =

- Genre: Reality; Entertainment
- Created by: MTV
- Directed by: Mickey Bishop; Greg Jones; Michael Leondis; Liana Stewarts; Bill Mohin; Josh Newman; Josh Blackmore; Becky Harrington; Sam Morton
- Presented by: Charlotte Crosby; Stephen Bear (2017); Scotty T (2018); Guest presenters (2018–20)
- Starring: See below
- Country of origin: United Kingdom
- Original language: English
- No. of series: 5
- No. of episodes: 41 (+1 Most Shocking Tattoos Special)

Production
- Executive producers: Ross McCarthy; Kate Bates; Jake Attwell; Craig Orr; Kerry Taylor
- Producers: Chloe Seddon; Mickey Bishop; Greg Jones; Michael Leondis; Liana Stewarts
- Editors: Nick Swingglehurst; James Morlarty; Owen Phillip
- Camera setup: Multi camera
- Running time: 60 minutes (includes adverts)
- Production company: Gobstopper

Original release
- Network: MTV UK
- Release: 3 April 2017 – 10 February 2020

Just Tattoo of Us is an MTV UK British reality tattoo programme that follows couples, friends, or family members as they go to the Just Tattoo of Us parlour to design a tattoo for one another. Announced in November 2016 by MTV UK, the series began airing on 3 April 2017 and has aired a total of five series up to March 2020. It was then confirmed that the show would be rested to make room for new upcoming shows.

== Summary ==
The show follows Charlotte Crosby and Stephen Bear as they open the doors to the 'Just Tattoo of Us' tattoo parlour in London. In each episode, pairs of friends, family members, or couples enter the parlour and explain to Bear and Crosby their relationship and the reasoning behind entering the show. They then individually visit the tattoo artist who has made a design for the other person based on a brief previously sent in. However, in this parlour, everyone who arrives will be getting a tattoo but will not have any say in what it is, as it will be designed by their friend, partner or family member who they came with, and the same will be done the other way round. After the designs are finished, everyone comes together for the reveal where the tattoos are finally seen. The participants then give their feedback on their tattoo, and Crosby and Bear also share their opinions.

== Cast ==
This is a list of current and former presenters and tattooists on MTV's Just Tattoo of Us.

Key
= Presenter
= Tattooist
= Guest presenter

Cast member	Seasons				
Cast member	1	2	3	4	5
Presenters
Stephen Bear	Presenter	Presenter			
Charlotte Crosby	Presenter	Presenter	Presenter	Presenter	Presenter
Scotty T			Presenter		
Matt Richardson	Guest presenter				
Danny Robinson	Guest presenter				
Charl Davies			Guest presenter	Guest presenter	
Aaron Chalmers				Guest presenter	
Joey Essex				Guest presenter	Guest presenter
Chloe Ferry				Guest presenter	Guest presenter
Lateysha Grace				Guest presenter	Guest presenter
Nathan Henry				Guest presenter	
Josh Ritchie				Guest presenter	Guest presenter
Olivia Attwood					Guest presenter
Charlotte Dawson					Guest presenter
Artists
Atom	Tattooist	Tattooist			
Charl Davies	Tattooist	Tattooist	Tattooist	Tattooist	Tattooist
Jodie Davies	Tattooist	Tattooist	Tattooist	Tattooist	
Cally-Jo	Tattooist	Tattooist	Tattooist	Tattooist	
Danny Robinson	Tattooist	Tattooist	Tattooist	Tattooist	
John Smith	Tattooist	Tattooist		Tattooist	
Jennafer Lee		Tattooist	Tattooist		
Jason Best			Tattooist	Tattooist	Tattooist
Hue Nguyen			Tattooist	Tattooist	Tattooist
Freddie Albrighton					Tattooist
Emma Callaghan					Tattooist
Jade Chanel P					Tattooist
Jamie Winters					Tattooist

Guest Presenters (episode they presented)

- Danny Robinson (Series 1 Episode 8)
- Matt Richardson (Series 1 Episode 9)
- Charl Davies (Series 3 Episode 2)

Guest Co-Presenters (episode(s) they co-presented with Charlotte Crosby)

- Josh Ritchie (Series 4 Episode 1, Series 4 Episode 5, Series 4 Episode 10)
- Charl Davies (Series 4 Episode 2)
- Chloe Ferry (Series 4 Episode 3, Series 4 Episode 7)
- Joey Essex (Series 4 Episode 4, Series 4 Episode 8)
- Aaron Chalmers (Series 4 Episode 6, Series 4 Episode 12)
- Lateysha Grace (Series 4 Episode 9, Series 5 Episode 1+2)
- Nathan Henry (Series 4 Episode 11)

== Development and production ==
In November 2016, MTV and Charlotte Crosby announced, via social media, a new reality tattoo series titled Just Tattoo of Us, presented by Stephen Bear and Crosby. The series was filmed in early 2017 for a 3 April broadcast. It was announced on This Morning that Crosby and Bear had decided to take part in the series as well by designing a tattoo for each other on the final episode of the series.

It was announced on 24 April 2017 that MTV had ordered a second series of Just Tattoo of Us. The second series began filming on 20 May 2017. It was also confirmed that Charlotte and Stephen would be returning as hosts. The second series began airing on 2 October 2017 and concluded on 4 December 2017.

It was confirmed that Just Tattoo of Us would return for a third series in 2018. It was announced that Stephen Bear would be replaced by Scotty T in series three. The third series began airing on 21 May 2018 and concluded on 23 July 2018. It also marked the first series to broadcast the episodes in non-chronological order.

It was confirmed that Just Tattoo of Us would return for a fourth series at the end of 2018. It was also confirmed that Charlotte Crosby would present alongside special guest presenters due to Scotty T quitting the show to rejoin Geordie Shore. The guest presenters included: Josh Ritchie, Aaron Chalmers, Chloe Ferry, Nathan Henry, Lateysha Grace, Joey Essex and Charl Davies. The fourth series began airing on 29 October 2018. For the first time in the shows history, this series was split in two. The final episode of part one aired on 3 December 2018, and the first episode of part two aired on 1 April 2019 and concluded on 6 May 2019.

== Episodes ==
=== Series overview ===
Series	Episodes	Originally released	
Series	Episodes	First released	Last released
1	9	3 April 2017	29 May 2017
2	10	2 October 2017	4 December 2017
3	10	21 May 2018	23 July 2018
4	12	29 October 2018	6 May 2019
Special		25 March 2019	
5	12	18 November 2019	10 February 2020

=== Series 1 (2017) ===
It was announced in November 2016 that MTV had announced that Geordie Shore star Charlotte Crosby and Ex on the Beach star Stephen Bear would present a new reality tattoo show to air in 2017, the first series began airing on MTV on 3 April and concluded on 29 May 2017.

No. overall	No. in series	Title	Client(s)	Guest presenter	Original release date	UK viewers (millions)
1	1	Episode 1	Lauren & Sophie (Cousins); Sophie & Joel (Couple); Amy & Luke (Friends)	-	3 April 2017	540,000
It's the first day of Charlotte and Stephen's tattoo parlour will the first day go down good or bad. Pairs of friends, family members and even the odd celebrity couples design tattoos for each other, however they won't get to see it till the big reveal. The first couple into the studio are Geordie Shore's Sophie and boyfriend Joel will the tattoos that they have designed for each other go down well or end badly?
2	2	Episode 2	Corey & Marc (Friends); Holly & Kyle (Couple); Dan & Sean (Friends)	-	10 April 2017	494,000
Today in the Just Tattoo parlour two Geordie Shore stars Holly and Kyle come to studio to design tattoos for each other but will it break their relationship. Also coming into the studio best friends Sean and Dan decide to prank each other with permanent reminders of girlfriends past.
3	3	Episode 3	Nathan & Liam (Friends); Ben & Lateysha (Couple)	-	17 April 2017	412,000
Coming into the Just Tattoo parlour today, Childhood friends Nathan and Liam plan to send a message to each other via their tattoo designs but will they like them when the final reveal comes, and Ben feels that his girlfriend Lateysha might not like the new ink when it's revealed.
4	4	Episode 4	Josh & Ricky (Friends); Abi & Scott (Couple); Amy May & Stevie (Father & Daughter)	-	24 April 2017	336,000
Abi is in for the surprise of her life when she sees the tattoo her boyfriend has designed for her. Plus, best mates Josh and Ricky reveal some of the series' most extreme tattoos yet.
5	5	Episode 5	Chloe & Ashley (Couple); Adam & Conrad (Friends); TJ & Jimmy (Friends)	-	1 May 2017	330,000
Coming into the tattoo studio today are ex-Celebrity Big Brother housemate and also ex to Stephen Bear, Chloe Khan and things become awkward very quickly between the two how will Bear cope. Chloe comes to the studio to get inked with new boyfriend Ashley Cain, while mates Adam and Conrad have got tattoo's that are shocking for Charlotte, will the designs go down well.
6	6	Episode 6	Jaymi & Aaron (Brothers); Holly & Kyle (Couple); Alicia & Louise (Friends)	-	8 May 2017	366,000
In the tattoo studio today, Union J star Jaymi Hensley comes to visits the studio with his brother Aaron, will they have the same brotherly love after they have both been inked up. Best Friends Alicia and Louise are also in the studio to deliver some extreme tattoos for each other will it end well, and Geordie Shore's Holly is back to get her revenge on her boyfriend Kyle who gave her a tattoo that she would never forget.
7	7	Episode 7	Beth & Anya (Friends); Jess & Denny (Couple); The Vivienne & Trashley (Friends)	-	15 May 2017	343,000
Newly engaged Jess Impiazzi and Denny Solomona put their relationship to the test, and drag queen pals The Vivienne and Trashley dish the dirt on each other with their tattoo designs. Charlotte and Bear also take the challenge and decide to design a tattoo for each other, will this end their relationship or will it make them stronger.
8	8	Episode 8	Stephen & Charlotte (Couple)	Danny Robinson	22 May 2017	355,000
In the series finale, the tables have been turned onto Charlotte and Stephen as they are about to design a tattoo for each other. However things don't go to plan when Bear finds the pain of having a tattoo too much to cope with, will he ditch the tattoo or will he go through with it? The big question is: will they stitch each other up or will they end up hating their tattoo?
9	9	Just Tattoo of Us: The Aftermath (Special)	TJ & Jimmy (Friends)	Matt Richardson	29 May 2017	268,000
In this special episode of Just Tattoo of Us, Charlotte and Bear look back at some of the highlights from the series with behind the scenes clips and interviews with the tattooist and clients from the first series. There will also be a live studio audience. Two clients from a previous episode return to give each other another tattoo, the tattoos were revealed live in the studio for the first time to the clients and audience and the viewers.

=== Ratings (series 1) ===
Episode	Date	Official MTV rating	MTV weekly rank	Official MTV+1 rating	Total MTV viewers
Episode 1	3 April 2017	523,000	2	17,000	540,000
Episode 2	10 April 2017	461,000	2	33,000	494,000
Episode 3	17 April 2017	382,000	2	30,000	412,000
Episode 4	24 April 2017	301,000	2	35,000	336,000
Episode 5	1 May 2017	330,000	2	36,000	366,000
Episode 6	7 May 2017	330,000	2	36,000	366,000
Episode 7	14 May 2017	315,000	2	28,000	343,000
Episode 8	22 May 2017	330,000	2	25,000	355,000
Episode 9	29 May 2017	264,000	2	4,000	268,000
Series average		360,000	2	27,000	387,000

=== Series 2 (2017) ===
It was announced on 24 April 2017 that MTV had ordered a series to air later in the year. It was also confirmed that Charlotte and Stephen would both return as host for the second series, filming began on 20 May 2017. It was confirmed that all the tattooists would be returning. The second series will begin on 2 October 2017. The second series will see a new Tattooist Jen join the show. Series two was the last series to have Stephen Bear as presenter due to him leaving the show at the end of filming for the second series.

No. overall	No. in series	Title	Client(s)	Original release date	UK viewers (millions)
10	1	Episode 1	Charlotte & Katie (Friends); Dan & Rich (Friends); Becky & Danny (Siblings)	2 October 2017	162,000
11	2	Episode 2	Imogen & Kyle (Couple); PJ & Harrison (Friends)	9 October 2017	235,000
12	3	Episode 3	Gareth & Declan (Couple); Dam & Jude (Friends); Connor & Jade (Couple)	16 October 2017	181,000
13	4	Episode 4	Chet & Casey (Brothers); Shae & Skye (Couple); Ellis & John-Paul (Friends)	23 October 2017	257,000
14	5	Episode 5	Hughie & Ryan (Couple); Brad & Bella (Couple); Lauren & Sophie (Cousins)	30 October 2017	193,000
15	6	Episode 6	Alicia & Troy (Siblings); Imogen & Krystal (Friends); Beth & George (Couple)	6 November 2017	214,000
16	7	Episode 7	Naomi & Terri (Friends); Billy & Joe (Friends); Ollie & Maisie (Couple)	13 November 2017	186,000
17	8	Episode 8	Jamie & Robert (Friends); Bridie & Trey (Friends)	20 November 2017	196,000
18	9	Episode 9	Will & Patrik (Friends); Abbie & Zoe (Mother & Daughter); Kirstie & Elise (Friends)	27 November 2017	181,000
19	10	Episode 10	Will Alex & Olivia (Couple); Chelsea & Brooke (Friends); Alicia & Louise (Friends)	4 December 2017	181,000

=== Ratings (series 2) ===
Episode	Date	Official MTV rating	MTV weekly rank	Official MTV+1 rating	Total MTV viewers
Episode 1	2 October 2017	162,000	3	5,000	167,000
Episode 2	9 October 2017	235,000	3	3,000	238,000
Episode 3	16 October 2017	181,000	4	5,000	186,000
Episode 4	23 October 2017	257,000	2	—N/a	257,000
Episode 5	30 October 2017	193,000	2	17,000	210,000
Episode 6	6 November 2017	214,000	2	13,000	227,000
Episode 7	13 November 2017	186,000	2	—N/a	186,000
Episode 8	20 November 2017	196,000	1	—N/a	196,000
Episode 9	27 November 2017	181,000	2	7,000	188,000
Episode 10	4 December 2017	181,000	2	17,000	198,000
Series average		198,600	—N/a	9,571	205,300

=== Series 3 (2018) ===
It was announced on 14 August 2017 that Just Tattoo of Us was renewed for a third series. The series will begin to air on 21 August 2018. Charlotte Crosby who will be returning for her third series. The third series will see Scotty T join the show as Charlotte's co-presenter due to Bear quitting the series in Series Two. The third series will also see a 2 new Tattooists Hue & Jason join the show, replacing Atom & John.

The episodes in this series were not broadcast in chronological order as seen in the table below.

No. overall	No. in series	Title	Client(s)	Guest presenter	Original release date	UK viewers (millions)
20	1	Episode 1	Bronte & Jack (Couple); Sam & Simon (Friends); Rhianna & Kierra (Friends)	-	21 May 2018	243,000
21	2	Episode 2	Scotty T (Presenter); Omar & Curf (Friends); Fran & Nic (Brothers)	Charl Davies	28 May 2018	200,000
22	3	Episode 3	Jess & Dom (Love Island Couple); Jordan and Faye (Friends); Harry & Karen (Mother & Son)	-	4 June 2018	174,000
23	4	Episode 4	Ashley & Jordan (Friends); Nicole and Dayna (Couple)	-	11 June 2018	248,000
25	6	Episode 6	Hue & Charl (Tattoo Artists); Chloe & Louis (Couple); Dijiana and Kyia (Friends)	-	18 June 2018	234,000
27	8	Episode 8	Ellie & Calvin (Couple); Hughie & Ryan (Big Brother Couple); Rishi & Courtney (Friends)	-	25 June 2018	285,000
28	9	Episode 9	Calum Best & Frankie Cocozza (Friends); Ryan & Natasha (Couple)	-	2 July 2018	259,000
24	5	Episode 5	Ant & Joe (Friends); Tian & Natalie (Friends); Crystal & Jack (Couple)	-	9 July 2018	130,000
26	7	Episode 7	Fraser and Sam (Friends); Mutya & Vas (Friends)	-	16 July 2018	122,000
29	10	Episode 10	Grant & Jon (Couple); Danny & Jodie (Tattoo Artists); Chloe & Misha (Friends)	-	23 July 2018	139,000

=== Series 4 (2018–2019) ===
Series four began airing on 29 October 2018, with Charlotte Crosby returning to present the show alongside special guest presenters as Scotty T quit the show (to rejoin Geordie Shore). The guest presenters will include Josh Ritchie, Aaron Chalmers, Chloe Ferry, Nathan Henry, Lateysha Grace, Joey Essex and Charl Davies. Stefan-Pierre Tomlin, also known as Mr Tinder for his most right-swiped status on the dating app, starred in the opening episode. The tattoo artist line-up will be similar to the third series however Jennafer Lee has quit the show and will be replaced by returning artist John Smith.

No. overall	No. in series	Title	Client(s)	Guest presenter	Original release date	UK viewers (millions)
30	1	My Mam and Dad!	Letitia & Gary (Charlotte Crosby’s Parents); Scott & Stefan (Friends); Michelle & Paula (Friends)	Josh Ritchie	29 October 2018	190,800
31	2	Indecent Proposal	Saffron & Sheniya (Friends); Mary & Lewis (Mother & Son); Emily & Chris (Couple)	Charl Davies	5 November 2018	220,900
32	3	Charlotte’s Revenge	Josh & Warren (Friends); Harriet & Jack (Friends/Ex Couple); John Smith (Tatooist)	Chloe Ferry	12 November 2018	161,800
In this episode Charlotte Crosby gets revenge on tattooist John Smith for Series 1 “Cheater” inking.
33	4	The Last Thing I Wanted	Chloe Ferry & Sam Gowland (Couple); Becky & Zoe (Frenemies); Brian & Victoria (Couple)	Joey Essex	19 November 2018	150,300
34	5	It’s Coming Home	Tom & Rykard (Friends); Natalee & Debs (Mother & Daughter); Josh & Wes (Friends)	Josh Ritchie	26 November 2018	150,900
35	6	Take Cover	Kieran Hayler (Katie Price's ex-husband); Connor & Matthew (Friends); Jess & Dan (Couple)	Aaron Chalmers	3 December 2018	138,800
Kieran Hayler leaves Hue to design and cover up the constant reminder of his relationship with Katie Price and to help him be able to finally move on. Note: Jess Hayes (along with Max Morley) was a winner of the first series of Love Island, although her appearance on Just Tattoo of Us is with her new boyfriend Dan.
Special	1	Most Shocking Tattoos	Best Bits of the series	-	25 March 2019	31,200
36	7	Forever Friends?	Benny & Scott (Friends); Bobby Norris & Charlie (Friends); Kobi & Macauley (Friends)	Chloe Ferry	1 April 2019	88,100
37	8	Broken Mirrors	Cameron & Shereece (Friends); Christian & Megan (Friends); Jordan & Zoe (Couple); Alex & Alfie (Friends)	Joey Essex	8 April 2019	82,500
38	9	Unfinished Business	Darren & Dean (Father & Son); Aisleyne & Amy (Friends); Jack & Crystal (Returning couple)	Lateysha Grace	15 April 2019	108,300
Note: Jack & Crystal where together on the show before as a couple in Episode 5 of Series 3. This time around Jack wants to proof he has changed and that he can be a nice guy.
39	10	Sibling Rivalries	Melissa & Lauren (Charlotte's Besties); Reece & Paige (Brother & Sister); Tom & Josh (Brothers)	Josh Ritchie	22 April 2019	73,100
40	11	You’ve Broken The Rules	Jack & Andrew (Housemates); Becky & Kodi (Cousins); Jimmy & Josh (Friends)	Nathan Henry	29 April 2019	58,400
Note: Jack & Andrew didn't get inked because they got caught cheating by Nathan, Charlotte & Danny. This happened after Jack refused to get the tattoo, designed for him by Andrew, in colour and spilling the colour and the subject of the tattoo itself.; Note: Becky confirmed she and tattoo artist Danny Robinson know each other and that they slept together before. They stopped seeing each other when Danny ghosted her after that.
41	12	True Feelings	Sam & Cheryl (Schoolmates); AJ & Monique (Friends)	Aaron Chalmers	6 May 2019	50,700

=== Series 5 (2019–2020) ===
Series five began on 18 November 2019, Charlotte Crosby returns to present the show alongside special guest presenters again, returning guest presenters from the fourth series are Josh Ritchie, Chloe Ferry, Lateysha Grace and Joey Essex. Charlotte Dawson and Olivia Attwood will join the cast as new guest presenters. The fifth series saw the biggest change in the tattoo artist line-up with Cally-Jo, Danny Robinson, Jodie Davies and John Smith all leaving the show, with the only returning artists from Series Four being Charl Davies, Hue Nguyen and Jason Best. They are joined by 4 new artists; Emma Callaghan, Freddie Albrighton, Jade Chanel and Jamie Winters.

Also the series added a twist titled "Stick or Twist" where the client could stick with their chosen tattoo or twist and have a completely random unknown tattoo designed by the artist, this could either be better or worse than the original design.

No. overall	No. in series	Title	Client(s)	Guest presenter	Original release date	UK viewers (millions)
42	1	Twist and Shout	Jade & Oli (Couple); Akeem & Tomasz (Friends); Georgia & Melissa (Friends)	Lateysha Grace	18 November 2019	79,400
In this episode Tomasz was given the option to stick or twist. He chose to twist, receiving the designer's mystery tattoo.
43	2	Not So Secret Secrets	Carlo & Darylle (Couple); Emily & Tom (Couple); Emma & Renee (Friends)	Lateysha Grace	25 November 2019	63,900
In this episode Tom was given the option to stick or twist. He chose to stick with the design Emily chose for him.
44	3	Mum, Mates and Mischief	Franchesca & Sandi (Family); Garry & Jake (Friends); Hattie & Leigh (Friends)	Josh Ritchie	2 December 2019	97,000
In this episode Jake was given the option to stick or twist. He chose to twist, receiving the designer's mystery tattoo.
45	4	Best of Frenemies	Millie & Jordan (Friends); Angel & Sonny (Couple); Connor & Liam (Brothers)	Charlotte Dawson	9 December 2019	61,200
In this episode Millie was given the option to stick or twist. She chose to twist, receiving the designer's mystery tattoo.
46	5	The Queen of Mean Meets Her Match	Henry & Karys (Friends); Charl & Jamie (Tattoo Artists); Adriana & Tanesha (Friends)	Joey Essex	16 December 2019	71,500
In this episode Henry was given the option to stick or twist. She chose to stick with the design Karys chose for her. A new male Tattoo Artist called Brandon appeared in this episode, but does not feature in the opening titles.
47	6	Til Death Tattoo Us Part	Marcel & Leon (Cousins); Ash & Josie (Friends); Jessica & Emily (Couple)	Joey Essex	23 December 2019	43,500
In this episode Ash was given the option to stick or twist. He chose to twist, receiving the designer's mystery tattoo.
48	7	Devin In the Detail	Grant & Jack (Friends); Beth & Merissa (Friends); Levi & Tasmin (Couple)	Charlotte Dawson	6 January 2020	N/A
49	8	TMI	TBA	TBA	13 January 2020	N/A
50	9	TMI	TBA	TBA	20 January 2020	N/A
51	10	TMI	TBA	TBA	27 January 2020	N/A
52	11	TMI	TBA	Chloe Ferry	3 February 2020	N/A
53	12	TMI	TBA	Lateysha Grace	10 March 2020	N/A

== International versions ==
Country	Local title	Host(s)	Network	Premiere / Air dates
Germany	Just Tattoo of Us	Elena Miras; Mike Heiter	TVNOW	3 August 2020 – present
Netherlands; Belgium	Just Tattoo of Us Benelux	Jaimie Vaes; Koen Kardashian	MTV	
United States	How Far Is Tattoo Far?	Nico Tortorella; Nicole "Snooki" Polizzi; Justina Valentine (season 2)	MTV	11 October 2018 – 3 October 2019
