= Shipwreck Island =

Shipwreck Island may refer to:

- Shipwreck Island, a water park in Jacksonville Beach, Florida
- Shipwreck Island, a fictional island from the Pirates of the Caribbean series

== See also ==
- Shipwrecked: The Island, a British reality television series
