= Lara Goodison =

English actress

Lara Goodison (born 1989 or 1990) is an English actress.

Goodison is from Oxshott, Surrey, and was educated at St Teresa's School Effingham and Hurtwood House. She first gained public attention when she became a contestant on Shipwrecked in 2008, aged 18. During this she was placed 18th by Nuts in their list of the 50 Sexiest Reality TV Babes in May 2008. Prior to Shipwrecked, she had worked part-time in an old people's home, but after returning she pursued a career in acting, despite having no professional training. She appeared in the Doctor Who episode "The Next Doctor", before being cast alongside Samuell Benta, Matt Kane, Connor Scarlett and Tosin Cole in a main role as 17-year-old Marla Mackinnon in the BBC series The Cut, a role she continued in for the second and third series as well. She is the only actor to have appeared in every single episode of the drama series.
