= Natalie Rushdie =

Musical artist (born 1986)

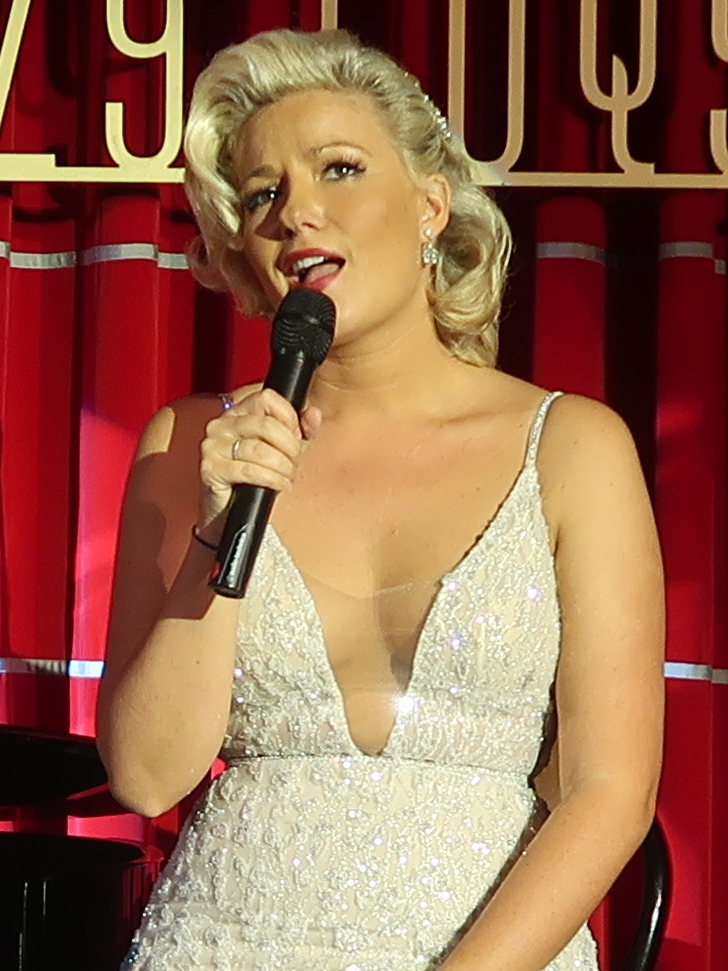
- Natalie Rushdie in 2017

Background information
- Born: Natalie Coyle; September 1986 (age 39); Falkirk, Scotland
- Genres: Classical, classical crossover
- Years active: 2011–present
- Spouse: Zafar Rushdie (m. 2016)
- Website: natalierushdie.com

Natalie Rushdie (née Coyle; born September 1986) is a Scottish singer. Classically trained, she has sung at the Royal Albert Hall, Wembley Stadium and the London Coliseum as well as for numerous charities and on television shows as well as being asked to sing at a number of sporting events.

== Early life and education ==
Rushdie was born Natalie Coyle in Falkirk, Scotland, and brought up in Linlithgow until moving to Surrey at the age of 10 where she attended St Teresa's School Effingham.

After graduating from Sheffield University with a degree in music, she was offered a place to train with Steven Maughan at the Amsterdam Opera House and later, with Jesús León in London. Her training led Rushdie to secure a place in the opera Don Giovanni, performed at Woodhouse.

== Music career ==
At the Classic BRIT Awards in June 2011, Rushdie supported Il Divo when they won the Artist of the Decade Award at the Royal Albert Hall. Soon after, Rushdie won a place with the Royal Choral Society with whom she has performed regularly, including her second performance of 2011 at the Royal Albert Hall, Carmina Burana. Additionally, Rushdie performed on the live final of Britain's Got Talent with Jackie Evancho (finalist in America's Got Talent), to an audience of over 15 million. Throughout 2011, Rushdie performed in numerous broadcast episodes of the BBC's Songs of Praise.

In 2012, Rushdie was selected to take part in the Associated Studios' four-month performance course, where she studied a broad range of musical genres which has helped to build on her classical roots and move into a classical-crossover style. The course ended with a performance at the Arts Theatre in London's West-End. At the end of 2012, Rushdie performed, for the second year running, in Duke of York Square for the Prince's Trust at their annual event to switch on the King's Road Christmas lights. Rushdie also performed at Attitude magazine's annual Christmas event at the Conran Shop, Chelsea. From the end of 2012 and into 2013, Rushdie has joined Classic BRIT Award winners Blake on their UK tour.

On 7 April 2013, Rushdie made her Wembley Stadium debut, singing the national anthem for the Football League Trophy Final (Southend United v Crewe Alexandra), in front of over 50,000 supporters and live on Sky Sports 1.

On 27 May 2013, Rushdie performed the national anthem at Wembley for the second time for the npower Championship play-off final (Crystal Palace v Watford). Rushdie's performance was to a sold-out crowd of 85,000.

On 24 August 2013, Rushdie was invited back to Wembley for the third time, to perform for the rugby league Tetley's Challenge Cup Final. Rushdie sang the national anthem and "Abide with Me" to a sold-out crowd of over 85,000 and live on the BBC.

Rushdie made her debut performance for England on 9 November 2013, where she performed the England and Fijian national anthems for the Rugby League World Cup England v Fiji match. Over two million people tuned in to watch the match. which was aired live on BBC One.

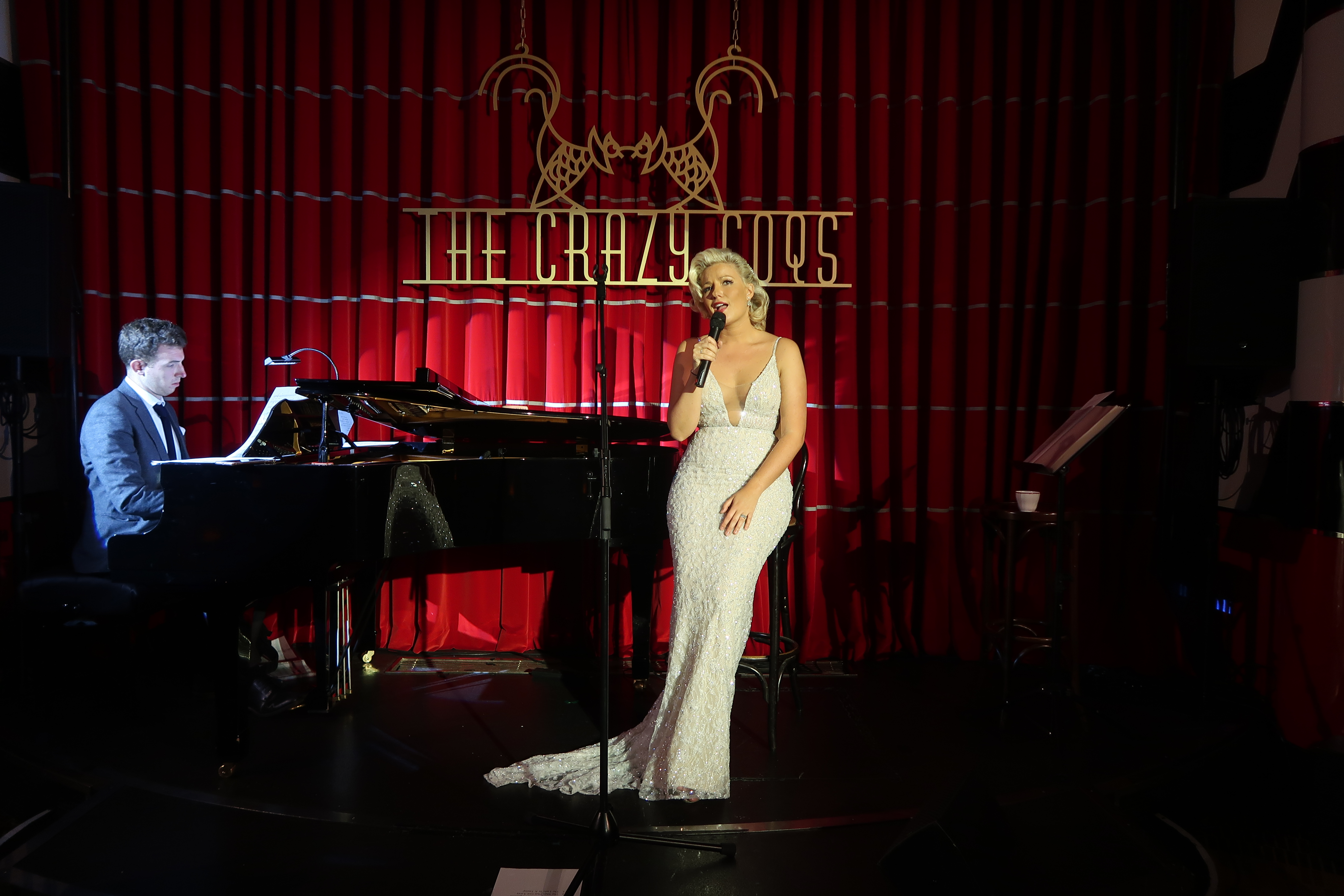
Rushdie performing in 2017

During the summer of 2017, Rushdie decided to change from performing classical music to Jazz. She sold out four dates at the West End venue Crazy Coqs at Brasserie Zedel and receive such positive response that the move was made permanent. Since this new beginning Rushdie has sold out subsequent concerts at Andrew Lloyd Webber's The Other Palace Theatre and performed at the London Coliseum alongside Pixie Lott, Bonnie Tyler, Una Healy and Tony Hadley, and in December 2018, she performed solo with the Royal Philharmonic Orchestra at The Royal Albert Hall for the Carols with Bloodwise Christmas concert.

In February 2019, Rushdie was invited to entertain guests at the BAFTA Gala event, where she performed an astonishing rendition of Oscar winning track "Shallow". This was followed on Sunday 24 February 2019 by Rushdie's 10th stadium performance and 6th at Wembley Stadium where she performed the national anthem ahead of the EFL Cup Final between Manchester City & Chelsea football clubs.

== Charities ==
Rushdie has performed in aid of a number of charities including the Duke of Edinburgh's Award Scheme, Cancer Research UK, Queen Elizabeth's Foundation for Disabled People, St Thomas' Hospital, St John's Hospice, London, and the Order of Malta Volunteers. Rushdie is also heavily involved with the Children's Trust and Marie Curie Cancer Care. She has recently been appointed Patron of Breathe, a partner of Guy's and St Thomas Charity, the largest NHS charity in the UK.

In May 2013, Rushdie performed for the Cystic Fibrosis Trust at the Nicky's Whisper Trophy Final at QPR's Loftus Road. MPs and celebrities including Alistair Campbell and Omid Djalili took part in the charity football match. Later that month, Rushdie also performed at Reading FC's Madejski Stadium for Celebrity Soccer Six in aid of the charity campaign 'Hearts and Goals', supported by Fabrice Muamba.

In February 2019, Rushdie performed at the Cancer Research UK "Dining With The Stars" gala raising funds for the Bobby Moore Foundation.

== Personal life ==
She has been married to Zafar Rushdie, son of novelist Salman Rushdie, since June 2016. The couple's first child, a daughter, was born in October 2020.
