= Connor Scarlett =

English actor

Connor Scarlett (born 1992) is an English actor from Crowborough, East Sussex. He is best known for his role in the teenage drama series The Cut from the BBC. He joined the series at the beginning of Series 2, alongside Lara Goodison, Matt Kane, Samuell Benta and Tosin Cole and has become one of the leading characters in the show. He portrayed Alex Fitzpatrick and resumed his role for Series 3. He also plays the recurring character Quinn in Wizards vs Aliens.
