= Shipwrecked: Battle of the Islands 2009 =

- Season 4
- Presented by: Craig Kelly (narrator)
- No. of days: 105
- No. of castaways: 31
- Winner: Gregory Jones
- Runner-up: Nadejah Williams
- Location: Moturakau and Rapota, Cook Islands, South Pacific
- No. of episodes: 15 episodes, each depicting one week

Release
- Original network: Channel 4
- Original release: 1 February – 10 May 2009

Additional information
- Filming dates: September 2008 – November 2008

Season chronology
- ← Previous; Battle of the Islands 2008 Next → Shipwrecked: The Island

Shipwrecked: Battle of the Islands 2009 is a United Kingdom reality television series, part of the Shipwrecked strand which aired on Channel 4's youth programming label T4 in different formats from 1999 until 2012. The 2009 series is the seventh series of Shipwrecked overall, and the fourth adopt the "Battle of the Islands" format. The series was recommissioned by Channel 4 on 26 June 2008.

Castaway auditions took place during the summer and filming for the series commenced in September 2008 and finished in early November 2008. It began airing on Sunday 1 February 2009 at 12:30pm on Channel 4.

This is the final original series of Shipwrecked: Battle of the Islands, and the penultimate series overall, following the axing of the T4 brand in December 2012. The series, using the "Battle of the Islands" format, returned in 2019 on E4.

== The Game ==
Shipwrecked is a reality television programme in which a number of people from the UK live on one of two islands (Shark Island and Tiger Island) for a period of sixteen weeks. Each week, one or two new arrivals come to the islands, spend equal time on each island as Tribe Leaders who will create their own island laws that the others must follow. At the weekly beach party, the new arrivals must decide on the tribe they wish to live on. At the end of the series, the island with the most castaways wins, with the winning islanders usually sharing a cash prize of £70,000, though in a surprising twist just one castaway will walk away with this year's prize money. It has not been determined if both islands will be eligible for the prize.

This year, T4 viewers selected a wildcard to be the final new arrival. Liran Nathan, a jeweller from North London, beat Maggie and Jarad in the T4 viewers' vote to join the Shipwrecked contestants and potentially choose the winner.

New arrivals spend an equal amount of time on each of the two islands. During this time the new arrivals act as island leaders and have the opportunity to make new rules which must be obeyed by existing tribe members. At the end of week beach party the new arrivals must make a joint decision as to which island they wish to stay on.

This year, island life is a lot more basic than previous series and resembles life on last year's third Hawk island with islanders having to go without luxuries such as mirrors and toilet papers and survive on only basic food rations. Live pigs and chickens reside on the islands as well, meaning the castaways have the opportunity to hunt for their food.

== Controversy ==
This year shipwrecked received a negative response from a section of its viewing audience and devoted fans. Complaints centered around the interference of the production/editing crew with the flow of the reality concept, corrupting the natural progression of the Shipwrecked series. Other complaints related to a lack of airtime due to the removal of supplementary shows for this year's series, missing hutcam diaries, and over editing.

Some of the contestants from this year's series also commented on production mishaps and editing failures.

One large online Shipwrecked community commenced a Shipwrecked Petition to report the above to the C4 executives. The closure of the official Channel 4 discussion forums only prompted further frustrations.

== Island nominations ==
The following is a list of nominations and the opposing tribe's response;

- Week 3: Mark to join Sharks - Accepted
- Week 5: Gregory to join Sharks - Accepted
- Week 6: Soodi to join Tigers - Accepted
- Week 11: Hollie to join Sharks - Accepted
- Week 12: Hollie to join Tigers - Accepted
- Week 12: Sonny to join Sharks - Rejected

== Pontoon race ==
Week 7: Silkie vs. Mackenzie - Mackenzie won for Sharks

== Tribes ==
| Sharks | | | Tigers | | |
| Member | Arrival Week | Original Tribe | Original Tribe | Arrival Week | Member |
| Rosie Meek; 19, St. Fagans | 1 | Sharks | Tigers | 1 | Sonny Henty; 19, London |
| Mackenzie Hunkin; 22, Eton | 1 | Sharks | Sharks | 1 | Soodi Asefi; 26, London |
| Xanthi Toupoyannis^{2} 22, Leeds | 1 | Sharks | Tigers | 3 | Silkie Carlo; 18, Brighton |
| Nadejah Williams^{1} 18, London | 1 | Tigers | Tigers | 3 | Tom Jaconelli; 22, Billingshurst |
| Andrew Darling; 22, Basingstoke | 2 | Sharks | Tigers | 4 | Franki Wilson; 21, Burnley |
| Mariel "Maz" Cunningham; 21, County Durham | 2 | Sharks | Tigers | 6 | Markus Hafner^{3} 19, Huddersfield |
| Mark Byron; 18, Liverpool | 1 | Tigers | Tigers | 7 | Della Thielamay; 23, London |
| Lois Gray^{3} 22, Scotland | 6 | Sharks | Tigers | 7 | Jack Taylor; 22, TBC |
| Kevin Ryan^{4} 18, Norfolk | 8 | Sharks | Tigers | 9 | Danny Balshaw^{5} 22, Liverpool |
| Gimli Jones^{5} ^{6} 22, Tunbridge Wells | 4 | Tigers | Tigers | 12 | Stacey Masey^{8} 21, TBC |
| Sasha Risner^{7} 18, London | 11 | Sharks | Sharks | 1 | Hollie Tu^{1} 20, London |
| Beneditta Enweremadu^{7} ^{8} 25, TBC | 8 | Sharks | Tigers | 13 | Matthew Agass^{9} 23, Manchester |
| Geri Masucci^{10} 22, Cheshunt | 14 | Sharks | Tigers | 1 | Hermione Russell^{10} 20, Henley-on-Thames |
| Liran Nathan; 19, London | 15 | Sharks | Tigers | 1 | Liam Byrne^{9} 22, Stockton on Tees |
| Doug Hogg^{10} 19, West Sussex | 5 | Sharks | | | |
| Dan Evered^{9} 24, London | 5 | Sharks | | | |
| Adam Ryan^{6} ^{8} 22, TBC | 10 | Sharks | | | |

^Note 1: Hollie and Nadejah had to swap islands at the end of week 1.
^Note 2: Xanthi was temporarily a member of Tigers for rule breaking in Week 2.
^Note 3: Lois and Markus chose Sharks, however the Sharks were only able to accept 1 of the two and so Markus had to join the Tigers.
^Note 4: Kevin originally did not want to even leave the Sharks to experience the Tigers and so Sonny, Hollie and Jack had to come and take him to Tigers.
^Note 5: After Danny chose the Tigers he, along with the other Tigers, had to choose a Shark to steal to the Tigers. Also, with this rule the taken Shark is not allowed to swap back to the Sharks. Danny chose Greg.
^Note 6: Adam chose the Sharks and then, due to the same rules as the previous week, chose to steal Greg back to the Sharks.
^Note 7: When Sasha chose the Sharks she had to replace someone on Shark island, because of this rule she and the rest of the Sharks had to choose a Shark to be sent to Tiger Island. Sasha chose Beneditta.
^Note 8: When Stacey chose the Tigers not only did she have to take a Shark with her, she also had to replace someone on Tiger island. with both of these rules she chose to take Adam from the Sharks and replace Beneditta which sent her back to the Sharks.
^Note 9: Following the same rules as the last two weeks when Matthew chose the Tigers not only did he have to banish a Shark to Tiger island, a Tiger had to be banished to Sharks. Dan went to the Tigers and Liam went to the Sharks.
^Note 10: Following the same rules as the previous 3 weeks when Geri chose the Sharks not only did she have to banish a Tiger to Shark island, a Shark had to be banished to Tigers. Hermione went to the Sharks and Doug went to the Tigers.

== Island status ==
| Contestant | Episode | | | | | | | | | | | | | | | |
| Contestant | 1 | 2 | 3 | 4 | 5 | 6 | 7 | 8 | 9 | 10 | 11 | 12 | 13 | 14 | Final Island | Vote |
|---|---|---|---|---|---|---|---|---|---|---|---|---|---|---|---|---|
| Hermione | Tigers | | | | | | | | | | | | | Sharks | Tigers | Greg |
| Hollie | Sharks | Tigers | | | | | | | | | Sharks | Tigers | | | | Greg |
| Liam | Tigers | | | | | | | | | | | | Sharks | | Tigers | Greg |
| Mackenzie | Sharks | | | | | | | | | | | | | | | N/A |
| Mark | Tigers | | Sharks | | | | | | | | | | | | | N/A |
| Nadejah | Tigers | Sharks | | | | | | | | | | | | | | N/A |
| Rosie | Sharks | | | | | | | | | | | | | | | N/A |
| Sonny | Tigers | | | | | | | | | | | | | | | Greg |
| Soodi | Sharks | | | | | Tigers | | | | | | | | | | Nadejah |
| Xanthi | Sharks | | Tigers | Sharks | | | | | | | | | | | | N/A |
| Andrew | N/A | Sharks | | | | | | | | | | | | | | N/A |
| Maz | N/A | Sharks | | | | | | | | | | | | | | N/A |
| Silkie | N/A | | Tigers | | | | | | | | | | | | | Nadejah |
| Tom | N/A | | Tigers | | | | | | | | | | | | | Greg |
| Frankie | N/A | | | Tigers | | | | | | | | | | | | Greg |
| Greg | N/A | | | Tigers | Sharks | | | | Tigers | Sharks | | | | | | Win |
| Dan | N/A | | | | Sharks | | | | | | | | Tigers | | Sharks | N/A |
| Doug | N/A | | | | Sharks | | | | | | | | | Tigers | Sharks | N/A |
| Lois | N/A | | | | | Sharks | | | | | | | | | | N/A |
| Markus | N/A | | | | | Tigers | | | | | | | | | | Nadejah |
| Della | N/A | | | | | | Tigers | | | | | | | | | Greg |
| Jack | N/A | | | | | | Tigers | | | | | | | | | Greg |
| Beneditta | N/A | | | | | | | Sharks | | | Tigers | Sharks | | | | N/A |
| Kevin | N/A | | | | | | | Sharks | | | | | | | | N/A |
| Danny | N/A | | | | | | | | Tigers | | | | | | | Greg |
| Adam | N/A | | | | | | | | | Sharks | | Tigers | | | Sharks | N/A |
| Sasha | N/A | | | | | | | | | | Sharks | | | | | N/A |
| Stacey | N/A | | | | | | | | | | | Tigers | | | | Greg |
| Matthew | N/A | | | | | | | | | | | | Tigers | | | Greg |
| Geri | N/A | | | | | | | | | | | | | Sharks | | N/A |
| Liran | N/A | | | | | | | | | | | | | | Sharks | N/A |
