= Colin Newell =

British television personality (1973–2020)

- Born: 13 July 1973; London, England
- Died: 25 November 2020 (aged 47); Enfield, London, England
- Other names: Heavy D; The Boominator
- Occupations: Actor; director; screenwriter
- Years active: 2013–2020
- Children: 1

Colin Newell (13 July 1973 – 25 November 2020), known as Heavy D or The Boominator, was a British TV personality.

== Life ==
He was best known for his roles in Storage Hunters and Celebrity Big Brother. Newell was a supporter of Arsenal Football Club and frequently took part in interviews for ArsenalFanTV. He took part in the 18th series of Celebrity Big Brother in August 2016.

Newell died on 25 November 2020 of a heart attack at the age of 47. He had a daughter born in 2019, with his ex-girlfriend, Bryony Harris.

== Filmography ==
=== Television ===
Year	Title	Role	Notes
2014–2016	Storage Hunters	Himself	Main buyer
2016	Celebrity Big Brother 18	Contestant	

=== Film ===
Year	Title	Role	Notes
2013	Seconds Out	Barney 'Rubble' Graham	Short film; also writer and director
2013	Parallel	Hal	Short film
2014	The London Firm	Pub Punter	
2016	Gangsters Gamblers Geezers	Dave Sanderson	
2021	Rise of the Footsoldier: Origins	Tommy Mac	Posthumous release
