= Cally-Jo =

British artist

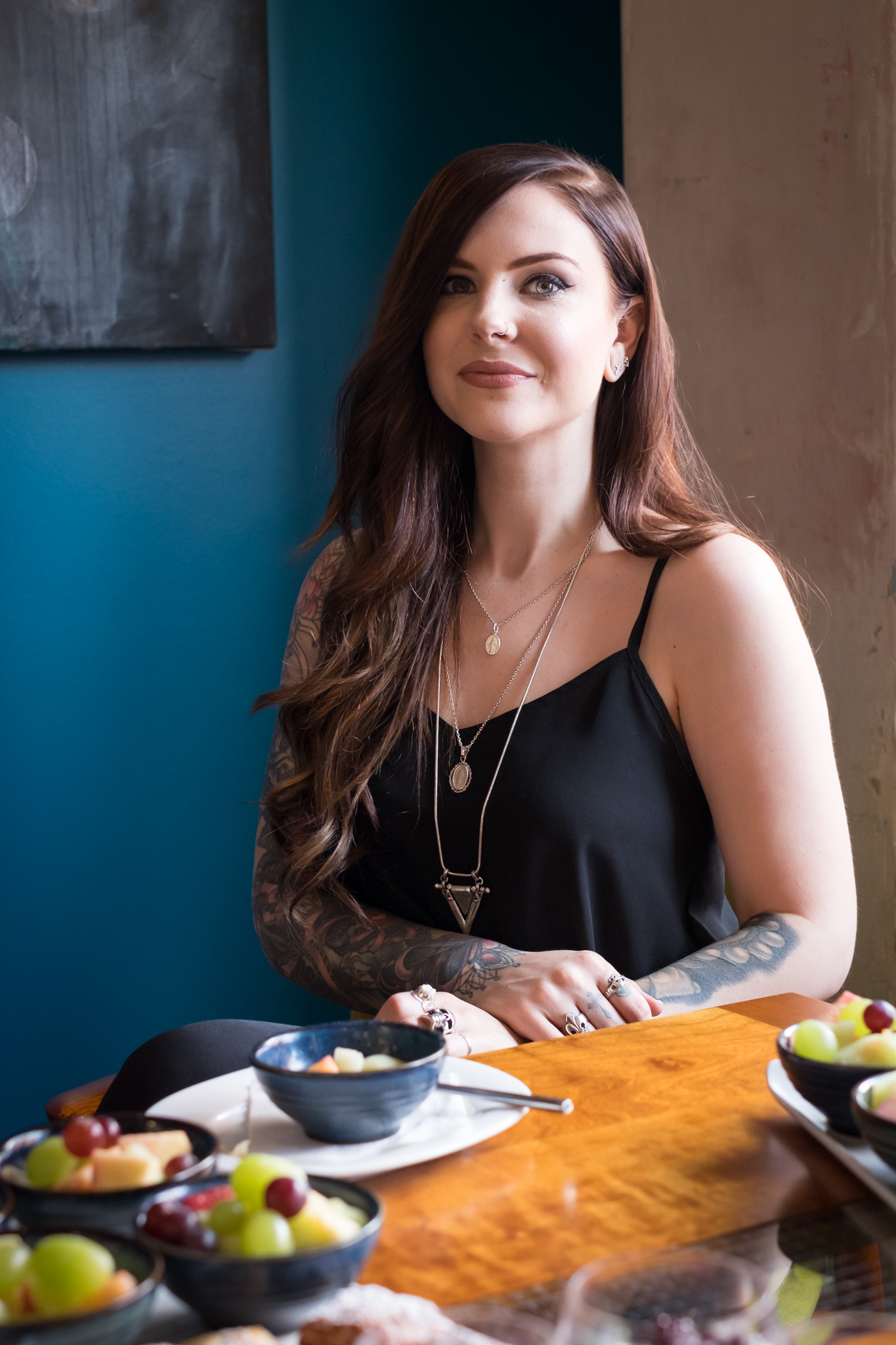
- Born: Cally-Jo Pothecary; 20 April 1989 (age 37); Southampton, United Kingdom
- Citizenship: British
- Occupations: Tattoo artist, fine artist, television personality
- Website: Official site

Cally-Jo Pothecary (born 20 April 1989) is a British fine artist and tattoo artist.

== Early life ==
Cally-Jo was born on 20 April 1989 in Southampton, the United Kingdom and grew up in Shirley, London. She studied fine art painting at Winchester School of Art, and graduated in 2011. Cally-Jo began to tattoo in 2012.

== Career ==
In 2012 Cally-Jo worked was hired as a tattoo artist at New Wave Tattoo Studio in North London. Whilst working at New Wave Tattoo, she designed a decal for the One (M8) phone, which was awarded to finalists at the British MOBO music awards.

In October 2013, Cally-Jo travelled to the Dominican Republic to tattoo Rihanna's hand.

Cally-Jo was a participant in the gallery, The 100 Hands Project, an exhibition presented at the National Maritime Museum in Cornwall, UK. The exhibit displayed 100 silicone hands tattooed by 100 tattoo artists who work in England.

In 2016 Cally-Jo collaborated with the Coffee vs. Gangs campaign which was founded by the coffee company Kenco. The campaign commissioned Cally-Jo to create art that would combine aspects of gang tattoos common in Honduras with coffee farming. This project attracted the attention of the press, as well as the visit of the Ambassador of Honduras.

Cally-Jo was a cast member in Season 1 and Season 2 of the MTV British entertainment reality show Just Tattoo of Us.
