= Stephen Bear =

English television personality (born 1990)

- Born: Stephen Henry Bear; 15 January 1990 (age 36); Walthamstow, London, England
- Occupation: Television personality
- Years active: 2011–2023
- Television: Shipwrecked; Ex on the Beach; Celebrity Big Brother; The Challenge
- Criminal charges: Voyeurism; disclosure of private sexual photographs
- Criminal penalty: 21 months imprisonment
- Criminal status: Jailed for 16 months in August 2026, for breaching restraining order

Stephen Henry Bear (born 15 January 1990) is an English former television personality and convicted sex offender. After appearing as a contestant on the E4 reality series Shipwrecked in 2011, he went on to appear on the MTV reality show Ex on the Beach, as a cast member in the third and fifth series respectively. He won the eighteenth series of Celebrity Big Brother in 2016, and subsequently went on to appear in various other shows including Celebs Go Dating, Just Tattoo of Us, and three series of The Challenge. In March 2023, Bear was jailed for disclosing private sexual photographs and films of his former girlfriend with intent to cause distress. In August 2026, Bear was imprisoned for 16 months, for breaching a restraining order imposed by the court.

== Early life ==
Stephen Henry Bear was born in Walthamstow, London, on 15 January 1990, the youngest of four children born to Stephen and Linda Bear (née Simons). He has two brothers Daniel and Robert, and a sister Hayley. According to his own testimony, he worked as a labourer and then a roofer before he began undertaking work in television.

== Career ==
Bear made his reality television debut in 2011, appearing as one of twelve contestants on the E4 reality series Shipwrecked: The Island. He subsequently went on to appear on the third series of the MTV reality show Ex on the Beach in 2015, and returned for the fifth series in 2016. In July 2016, Bear entered the Celebrity Big Brother house to compete in the eighteenth series. A controversial housemate, he became eternally nominated and faced every eviction from Day 9 onwards. Despite this, Bear went on to reach the final and ultimately won the series. In 2017, Bear appeared as a cast member on the second series of Celebs Go Dating. He was subsequently removed from the series during the eighteenth episode for breaking the rules by dating Charlotte Crosby outside of the agency. Bear went on to front the first two series of the MTV series Just Tattoo of Us alongside Crosby, before leaving the show following their split. In 2019, Bear competed in the MTV reality competition The Challenge: War of the Worlds, and was eliminated in the tenth episode. Later that year, he competed in the next series, The Challenge: War of the Worlds 2, in which he fared less well and was eliminated in the seventh episode. In 2020, he competed in The Challenge: Total Madness, which transpired to be his final television appearance prior to his arrest. He was eliminated in the eighth episode. Bear opened an OnlyFans account in October 2020, and began uploading X-rated content.

== Personal life ==
In July 2025, Bear married his 18-year-old Brazilian girlfriend, publicly known as Miami, in a ceremony held in Brazil, where he had relocated earlier that year. The wedding occurred approximately 18 months after his release from prison.

== Prosecution ==
Bear was arrested in January 2021, following an investigation into the alleged disclosure of sexual photographs without consent after he had uploaded CCTV footage of himself having sex with his then ex-girlfriend Georgia Harrison to his OnlyFans account. He was charged on 14 May 2021 with voyeurism, disclosing private, sexual photographs and films with intent to cause distress, and harassment without violence. Bear pleaded not guilty, but on 13 December 2022 he was found guilty. On 3 March 2023, Bear was sentenced to 21 months imprisonment and began serving his sentence at HM Prison Chelmsford, before being transferred to HM Prison Brixton in August 2023. He was released from prison early on 17 January 2024.

On 6 August 2026, Bear was sentenced to a further 16 months in prison, after admitting breaching a restraining order that banned him from posting online about Harrison. The judge additionally extended the restraining order, to prevent Bear from contacting Harrison's mother and her friend.

== Filmography ==
As himself
Year	Title	Notes	Ref.
2011–2012	Shipwrecked	Contestant	
2015	Ex on the Beach	Cast member; series 3	
2016	Celebrity Big Brother	Winner; series 18	
2016, 2017	Loose Women	Guest; 3 episodes	
2016	Ex on the Beach	Cast member; series 5	
2017	Celebs Go Dating	Cast member; series 2	
2017	Just Tattoo of Us	Presenter; series 1–2	
2019	Eating with My Ex	Guest; 1 episode	
2019	The Challenge: War of the Worlds	Contestant	
2019	Hey Tracey!	Guest; 1 episode	
2019	The Challenge: War of the Worlds 2	Contestant	
2020	The Challenge: Total Madness	Contestant	

== Bibliography ==
- Bear's Necessities (2017)

Preceded by Scotty T	Celebrity Big Brother UK winner Series 18 (2016)	Succeeded by Coleen Nolan
