= Shipwrecked: Battle of the Islands 2019 =

- Season 2019
- Presented by: Vick Hope (narrator)
- Winner: Tigers
- Runner-up: Sharks
- Location: Moturakau and Rapota, Cook Islands, South Pacific
- No. of episodes: 15

Release
- Original network: E4
- Original release: 28 January – 15 February 2019

Additional information
- Filming dates: Summer 2018

Season chronology
- ← Previous; Shipwrecked: The Island

Shipwrecked: Battle of the Islands 2019 is a United Kingdom reality television series, part of the Shipwrecked franchise which originally aired on Channel 4's youth programming label T4 in different formats from 1999 until 2012. The 2019 series is the ninth series of Shipwrecked overall, and the fifth to adopt the "Battle of the Islands" format.

The series was confirmed by Channel 4 on 22 May 2018 with castaway auditions and filming for the series commencing in Summer 2018. It began airing on 28 January 2019, at 9pm on E4, and aired every weeknight for 15 episodes, concluding on 15 February 2019. The series was narrated by Vick Hope.

The series was the first series of Shipwrecked to air since Shipwrecked: The Island concluded on 31 January 2012 and the first revived series of the "Battle of the Islands" format since 2009.

The Tigers won against the Sharks sharing the £50,000 prize. On 15 July 2019, it was announced that the revived show had been axed due to low ratings.

== The Game ==
Shipwrecked is a reality programme in which a number of people from the UK live on one of two islands (Shark Island and Tiger Island) for a period of several weeks. Each week, one or more new arrivals spend equal time on each island with the weekly beach party announcement where the new arrival will choose which island they wish to live on for the remainder of the competition.

At the end of the series, the island with the greater number of castaways wins, sharing the cash prize of £50,000.

== Tribes ==
Sharks			Tigers		
Member	Arrival Episode	Original Tribe	Original Tribe	Arrival Episode	Member
Tom Wotton; 20, Devon	1	Sharks	Tigers	1	Christian James; 24, London
Kush Khanna; 26, London	1	Sharks	Tigers	1	Hollie Hobin; 24, Bromley
Emma Fleming; 21, Rutland	1	Sharks	Tigers	1	Liv Lelaini; 19, Manchester
Kalia Lai; 20, Dunstable	1	Sharks	Tigers	4	Jamie Hodge; 23, Newquay
Tula "Big T" Fazakerley; 26, London	1	Sharks	Tigers	5	Danielle Collins; 24, Brighton
Freja Budd; 25, Northampton	3	Sharks	Tigers (Note: Troy was originally eliminated after losing his duel to Sam. However, as Josh left the Island, Troy was given his place on the Tiger tribe.)	6	Troy Cooke; 23, London
Daisy Bowles; 22, Elsenham	3	Tigers	Tigers	11	Leah Hollie; 25, Stoke-on-Trent
Sam Bhaumick; 24, London	6	Sharks	Tigers	8	Patrick Greenway; 29, Surrey
Stacey Freeman; 19, Brighton	11	Sharks	Sharks	10	Sean Lineker; 27, London
Beth Spiby; 22, Manchester	11	Sharks	Tigers	11	Jaden Richards; 19, Farsley
			Tigers	11	Brad Mattinson; 19, Brighton

=== Departed Castaways ===
Arrival Episode	Episode Departed	Member	Tribe	Reason
2	6	Josh Christie; 23, London	Tigers	Family Emergency
4	7	Sara Murphy; 22, Belfast	Sharks	Personal

=== Eliminated Castaways ===
For this series there were numerous twists introduced to determine how castaways are eliminated from the competition. These twists included a tribal vote used in the first few episodes whilst subsequent episodes have introduced "duels" where two castaways face off against one another in a competition to remain on the island, and newcomers tasked to eliminate one (or more) players from competition.

Episode	Member	Chosen Tribe
2	Casey Gore; 24, Cheltenham	Tigers
5	Simone Collins; 24, Brighton	Tigers
7	Emma Milton; 24, Manchester	(none)
8	Courtney Butcher; 20, Guernsey	(none)
9	Ailish Shaw; 23, Normanby	(none)
10	Harry Goodwins; 26, London	Tigers
13	Precious John; 25, Dublin	Sharks
13	Lottie Day; 24, London	Tigers

== Episodes ==
No.	Title	Original release date
1	"Episode One"	28 January 2019
2	"Episode Two"	29 January 2019
3	"Episode Three"	30 January 2019
4	"Episode Four"	31 January 2019
5	"Episode Five"	1 February 2019
6	"Episode Six"	4 February 2019
7	"Episode Seven"	5 February 2019
8	"Episode Eight"	6 February 2019
9	"Episode Nine"	7 February 2019
10	"Episode Ten"	8 February 2019
11	"Episode Eleven"	11 February 2019
12	"Episode Twelve"	12 February 2019
13	"Episode Thirteen"	13 February 2019
14	"Episode Fourteen"	14 February 2019
15	"Episode Fifteen"	15 February 2019

== Reception ==
Reviewing the first episode, The Telegraph described it as "fiendishly watchable" and "smartly edited", though concluding "this felt like a backwards step. A throwback to the early days of reality TV - the likes of Castaway and Survivor - not to mention a transparent bid to cash in on Love Island's success. In Shipwrecked’s favour, at least the casting was more diverse in terms of ethnicity, sexuality and social class. And this lot also possessed more brain cells than most of ITV2’s villa-dwellers."
