= Celebrity Big Brother (British TV series) series 18 =

Celebrity Big Brother
- Series 18
- Series eighteen logo
- Presented by: Emma Willis
- No. of days: 30
- No. of housemates: 15
- Winner: Stephen Bear
- Runner-up: Ricky Norwood
- Companion shows: Big Brother's Bit on the Side
- No. of episodes: 33

Release
- Original network: Channel 5
- Original release: 28 July – 26 August 2016

Series chronology
- ← Previous; Series 17 Next → Series 19

Celebrity Big Brother 18 is the eighteenth series of the British reality television series Celebrity Big Brother, hosted by Emma Willis and narrated by Marcus Bentley. The series launched on 28 July 2016, just two days after the conclusion of Big Brother 17 on Channel 5 in the United Kingdom and TV3 in Ireland. The series ended on 26 August 2016, making it the longest summer series to date and the third-longest series of Celebrity Big Brother in its history, behind series 15 and 17, respectively. Rylan Clark-Neal continued to present the spin-off show Celebrity Big Brother's Bit on the Side. It was the eleventh celebrity series and the seventeenth series of Big Brother overall to air on Channel 5.

On 26 August 2016, the series was won by Stephen Bear with Ricky Norwood finishing as runner-up.

== Format ==
Celebrity Big Brother is a game show in which a group of celebrity contestants, referred to as housemates, live in isolation from the outside world in a custom built "house", constantly under video surveillance. During their time in the House, the housemates are required to nominate two of their fellow contestants for potential eviction, and the two or more with the most votes would be nominated. This process is mandatory for all housemates, and failure to comply could result in expulsion from the House. The public then vote, with one of those celebrities evicted from the house. When the final week arrives, the viewers vote for which of the remaining celebrities should win the series, and the housemate with the most votes becomes the winner.

During their time in the House, housemates are given weekly tasks to perform. The housemates wager a portion of their weekly shopping budget on the task, and either win double their wagered fund or lose the wagered fund depending on their performance in the task. The housemates are required to work as a group to complete their tasks, with the format of the tasks varying based on the number of remaining housemates. Throughout the series, some housemates have been given secret tasks that must either be completed individually or with a small group; failure to do so can result in the housemate being nominated or punished in the House. Should the housemates run out of the food provided for them, an emergency ration was available to them. The housemates are forbidden from discussing nominations, and doing so could result in punishment. The format of the series is mainly seen as a social experiment, and requires housemates to interact with others who may have differing ideals, beliefs, and prejudices. Housemates are also required to make visits to the Diary Room during their stay in the House, where they are able to share their thoughts and feelings on their fellow housemates and the game.

== Housemates ==
On Day 1, fifteen housemates entered the house:

Celebrity	Age on entry	Notability	Day entered	Day exited	Status
Stephen Bear	26	Reality TV star	1	30	Winner
Ricky Norwood	33	Actor	1	30	Runner-up
Renee Graziano	48	Reality TV star	1	30	3rd place
Marnie Simpson	24	Reality TV star	1	30	4th place
Aubrey O'Day	32	Singer and reality TV star	1	30	5th place
Frankie Grande	33	Social Media Mogul and half-brother of Ariana Grande (Note: Frankie Grande previously participated on the sixteenth series of Big Brother in the United States, where he finished in 5th place.)	1	30	6th place
Samantha Fox	50	Model and singer	1	27	Evicted
Katie Waissel	30	Singer	1	27	Evicted
James Whale†	65	Radio broadcaster	1	23	Evicted
Lewis Bloor	26	Reality TV star	1	23	Evicted
Heavy D†	43	Reality TV star	1	20	Evicted
Chloe Khan	25	Media personality	1	16	Evicted
Saira Khan	46	TV presenter	1	13	Evicted
Grant Bovey	55	Media personality and ex-husband of Anthea Turner	1	9	Evicted
Christopher Biggins	67	Actor and TV presenter	1	9	Ejected

=== Aubrey O'Day ===
Aubrey O'Day is an American singer and reality television personality. She competed in the MTV series Making the Band, on which she won a place as a member of girl group Danity Kane. She also formed the musical duo Dumblonde, and has made appearances on television shows such as All About Aubrey and The Celebrity Apprentice. She entered the house on Day 1. On Day 6, she received a formal and final warning for unacceptable behaviour. On Day 30, she left the house in fifth place.

=== Stephen Bear ===
Stephen Bear, known as Bear, is a British reality television personality. He first appeared as a contestant on the Channel 4 series Shipwrecked, before appearing as a cast member on the third series of MTV's Ex on the Beach. He entered the house on Day 1. On Day 7 he was given a formal and final warning for unacceptable behaviour. On Day 9, he was cursed with eternal nomination for the duration of the series by his other housemates and faced every subsequent eviction. On Day 30, he left the house as the winner.

=== Christopher Biggins ===
Christopher Biggins, also known as Biggins, is an English actor and television presenter, most known for his roles in television and theatre. In 2007 he won the seventh series of I'm a Celebrity... Get Me Out of Here!. He entered the house on Day 1. He was removed from the house on Day 9 after making offensive comments. Forty-four people complained to Ofcom about comments Biggins made about bisexuals, but Ofcom ruled that although the comments could cause offence, they were likely to be within the audience's expectations, and his comments were therefore found not to be in breach of broadcasting rules.

=== Chloe Khan ===
Chloe Khan, formerly known as Chloe Mafia, is a British model and media personality. She is most known for her audition during the seventh series of The X Factor, and for appearing on Snog Marry Avoid?. She later became a Playboy model. She entered the house on Day 1. She became the third housemate to be evicted on Day 16, following an eviction showdown with Marnie.

=== Frankie Grande ===
Frankie Grande is an American dancer, singer, actor, and Social Media Mogul who is the half-brother of Ariana Grande. As an actor, he has appeared in Broadway musicals such as Mamma Mia! and Rock of Ages. In 2014, he competed in the sixteenth series of Big Brother USA where he finished fifth. He entered the house on Day 1. On Day 30, he left the house in sixth place.

=== Grant Bovey ===
Grant Bovey is a British businessman, most notable for his former marriage to television presenter Anthea Turner. He entered the house on Day 1. He became the first housemate to be evicted.

=== Heavy D ===
Colin Newell, better known as Heavy D, was a British television personality, best known for appearing as a main buyer on Storage Hunters UK. He also made appearances on the YouTube football fan channel ArsenalFanTV. He entered the house on Day 1. He became the fourth housemate to be evicted on Day 20.

=== James Whale ===
James Whale was an English television and radio broadcaster. He became the host of The James Whale Show on Radio Aire in Leeds in the 1980s, which was simulcast on national television. He also hosted a night time radio show on Talksport between 1995 and 2000. He entered the house on Day 1. He became the sixth to be evicted on Day 23.

=== Katie Waissel ===
Katie Waissel is an English singer-songwriter, who was a finalist on the seventh series of The X Factor and finished seventh. She entered the house on Day 1. She became the seventh housemate to be evicted on Day 27.

=== Lewis Bloor ===
Lewis Bloor is an English reality television personality, best known for starring as a cast member in the ITVBe semi-reality programme The Only Way Is Essex. He entered the House on Day 1. On Day 20, he was given a formal and final warning for unacceptable behaviour. He became the fifth housemate to be evicted on Day 23.

=== Marnie Simpson ===
Marnie Simpson is an English reality television personality, best known for appearing as a cast member in the MTV reality series Geordie Shore. She entered the house on Day 1. On Day 30, she left the house in fourth place.

=== Renee Graziano ===
Renee Graziano is an American reality television personality and author, most notable for appearing as a cast member on the VH1 reality series Mob Wives. She is the daughter of Anthony Graziano, a former consigliere of the Bonanno crime family. She entered the house on Day 1. On Day 30, she left the house in third place.

=== Ricky Norwood ===
Ricky Norwood is an English actor, most notable for playing Fatboy in the BBC soap opera EastEnders between 2010 and 2015. He entered the House on Day 1. On Day 30, he left the house as runner-up.

=== Saira Khan ===
Saira Khan is an English television personality. She is best known for being the runner-up on the first series of The Apprentice, and for appearing as a regular panellist on Loose Women. She entered the house on Day 1. She was the second housemate to be evicted on Day 13.

=== Samantha Fox ===
Samantha Fox is an English singer, songwriter, and former model, best known for appearing as a model on Page 3 of The Sun newspaper in the mid-1980s. She released her debut single "Touch Me (I Want Your Body)" in 1986, which reached number one in several countries. She also took part in the ninth series of I'm a Celebrity... Get Me Out of Here!, where she finished ninth. She entered the house on Day 1. She became the eighth housemate to be evicted on Day 27.

== Nominations table ==
	Day 3	Day 4	Day 9	Day 10	Day 13	Day 17	Day 20	Day 25	Day 30 Final		Nominations received
Bear	Not eligible	James, Ricky	Aubrey	Aubrey, Ricky	Renee	Renee, Ricky	Samantha, Ricky	Frankie	Winner (Day 30)		9
Ricky	Not eligible	Grant, James	Bear	Lewis, Chloe	Not eligible	Lewis, Heavy D	James, Lewis	Katie	Runner-up (Day 30)		8
Renee	Not eligible	James, Grant	Saira	Lewis, Marnie	Not eligible	Heavy D, Lewis	James, Ricky	Samantha, Marnie	Third place (Day 30)		5
Marnie	Not eligible	James, Frankie	Heavy D	Heavy D, Aubrey	Not eligible	Heavy D, James	James, Frankie	Ricky, Samantha	Fourth place (Day 30)		10
Aubrey	Not eligible	Grant, James	Bear	Lewis, Saira	Not eligible	Heavy D, Lewis	James, Lewis	Marnie, Samantha	Fifth place (Day 30)		6
Frankie	Not eligible	James, Grant	Bear	Lewis, Marnie	Not eligible	Lewis, Marnie	James, Lewis	Marnie, Katie	Sixth place (Day 30)		5
Samantha	Not eligible	Bear, Marnie	Heavy D	Heavy D, Chloe	Not eligible	Heavy D, Lewis	James, Lewis	Frankie	Evicted (Day 27)		6
Katie	Not eligible	Grant, James	Bear	Heavy D, Saira	Not eligible	Heavy D, James	James, Ricky	Frankie	Evicted (Day 27)		6
James	Not eligible	Grant, Bear	Bear	Saira, Heavy D	Not eligible	Aubrey, Heavy D	Lewis, Marnie	Evicted (Day 23)			22
Lewis	Not eligible	James, Ricky	Heavy D	Aubrey, Heavy D	James	Renee, Heavy D	Samantha, Aubrey	Evicted (Day 23)			16
Heavy D	Not eligible	James, Renee	Bear	Lewis, Saira	Marnie	Renee, Katie	Evicted (Day 20)				19
Chloe	Not eligible	Katie, James	James	Katie, Saira	Not eligible	Evicted (Day 16)					2
Saira	Not eligible	Bear, Grant	Heavy D	Heavy D, Katie	Evicted (Day 13)						7
Grant	Not eligible	Samantha, James	Evicted (Day 9)								8
Biggins	Saira, Lewis, Heavy D	Marnie, Grant	Ejected (Day 9)								N/A
Notes	1	1	2	2	2, 3	2	2, 4	2, 5	6		
Against public vote	none	Grant, James	none	Bear, Heavy D, Lewis, Saira	Bear, Chloe, James, Marnie	Bear, Heavy D, Lewis, Renee	Bear, James, Lewis, Ricky, Samantha	Bear, Frankie, Katie, Marnie, Ricky, Samantha	Aubrey, Bear, Frankie, Marnie, Renee, Ricky		
Ejected	none	Biggins	none								
Evicted	none	Grant; Fewest votes to save	none	Saira; Fewest votes to save	Chloe; Evicted by wheel (out of 2)	Heavy D Fewest votes to save	Lewis; Fewest votes (out of 4) to save	Katie; Fewest votes to save	Frankie; 3.54% (out of 6)	Renee; 14.66% (out of 3)	
Evicted	none	Grant; Fewest votes to save	none	Saira; Fewest votes to save	Chloe; Evicted by wheel (out of 2)	Heavy D Fewest votes to save	Lewis; Fewest votes (out of 4) to save	Katie; Fewest votes to save	Aubrey; 4.82% (out of 5)	Ricky; 34.57% (out of 2)	
Evicted	none	Grant; Fewest votes to save	none	Saira; Fewest votes to save	Chloe; Evicted by wheel (out of 2)	Heavy D Fewest votes to save	James; Fewest votes (out of 4) to save	Samantha; Fewest votes to save	Marnie; 6.51% (out of 4)	Ricky; 34.57% (out of 2)	
Evicted	none	Grant; Fewest votes to save	none	Saira; Fewest votes to save	Chloe; Evicted by wheel (out of 2)	Heavy D Fewest votes to save	James; Fewest votes (out of 4) to save	Samantha; Fewest votes to save	Bear; 35.90% to win		

Notes

- ^Note 1: On Day 1, the public voted for Biggins to become the "Secret Boss", and believed he had sole control over who was nominated in the first week. However, the housemates were aware of his position, and were told that the housemates he nominates will actually receive immunity. He chose Saira on Day 1, Lewis on Day 2 and Heavy D on Day 3. For completing the task, Biggins also received immunity.
- ^Note 2: On Day 9, the housemates each voted in a face-to-face vote for one housemate to receive 'eternal nomination'. Bear received the most votes and will face every eviction until he is either evicted or reaches the final.
- ^Note 3: Shortly after Saira's eviction, the three eviction survivors; Bear, Heavy D and Lewis were told they had to give a killer nomination each to decide who would face eviction. On Day 14, Renee was saved from eviction and had to replace herself with another housemate. She chose Chloe. After James and Bear were saved, the two housemates with the fewest votes: Chloe and Marnie, went head-to-head in a game of chance to determine who would be evicted. The housemates each voted for who they would like to leave, which would take up a proportion of a wheel. All housemates except Chloe and Bear voted to evict Chloe, with Chloe and Bear voting Marnie. James was revealed to have received the most public votes to save and given the task of spinning the wheel. Chloe was evicted after the wheel landed on one of her sections.
- ^Note 4: The nominations were face-to-face. This week was a double eviction.
- ^Note 5: The housemates were separated into two teams for the festive themed head-to-head challenges. The Elves (Aubrey, Frankie, Marnie and Renee) won two nominations to cast, whilst The Reindeers (Bear, Katie, Ricky and Samantha) only had one nomination to give each.
- ^Note 6: This week the public were voting for who they wanted to win. The voting figures reflect the overall share of the final vote, and do not take into account the vote freezes between each position; due to rounding, the figures do not perfectly add up to 100%. Bear won with 50.94% of the vote over Ricky.

== Summary ==
Day 1	Entrances	Biggins, Saira, Frankie, Ricky, Renee, Marnie, James, Aubrey, Bear, Katie, Lewis, Grant, Chloe, Heavy D and Samantha entered the house.
Day 1	Twists	The housemates were thrown a silent disco whilst the public voted for which housemate they wanted to be the "Secret Boss". During the disco Biggins's music was interrupted as Big Brother told him the public had given him the role of "Secret Boss" and he would have sole responsibility of nominations. However, the other housemates were let in on the secret and were told that this was a lie. In fact they had to receive a nomination from Biggins in order to receive immunity. Later that night, Biggins nominated Saira and she was granted immunity.
Day 2	Twists	Biggins nominated Lewis and granted him immunity.
Day 3	Twists	Biggins nominated Heavy D and granted him immunity. Biggins was then told the truth about the twist and for passing, he was also granted immunity.
Day 3	Tasks	The Housemates played Game of Phones, in which three Housemates had to stand in front of three phoneboxes whilst the others were given a fact about one of them. The housemates then had to get in the phonebox of the housemate they believe the fact is about. An incorrect answer meant they would be gunged.
Day 4	Nominations	The housemates nominated for the first time. Grant and James received the most nominations and faced the public vote.
Day 5	Tasks	Biggins hosted a talent show with Aubrey, Frankie and Renee as judges. Samantha won after receiving maximum points.
Day 5	Punishments	As punishment for Bear, Biggins, James, Renee and Saira discussing nominations, the hot water and electrical appliances were switched off.
Day 6	Tasks	For the first shopping task, Housemates separated into Humans; Bear, Biggins, Heavy D, James, Katie, Marnie, Renee and Samantha, and Artificials; Aubrey, Chloe, Frankie, Grant, Lewis, Ricky and Saira. Each Human had an Artificial to do everything they asked. This was a head-to-head task between the Humans and Artificials with the winners receiving a luxury shopping budget and the losers receiving basic. For the first round the teams were asked a series of trivia questions. The first team to answer 7 questions without breaking the circuit would win the round. The Artificials were declared the winners.
Day 6	Punishments	Aubrey was given a formal and final warning after spitting in Bear's food and drink then serving them to him during the Humans vs Artificials task.
Day 7	Tasks	For the second round of the Humans vs Artificials shopping task, the teams went head-to-head to see who could get the most emotion out of the other team. This round was declared a draw. Thus since the Artificials won the first round, they won the shopping task.
Day 7	Punishments	Bear was given a formal warning for throwing a bottle across the garden, smashing a mirror and invading Heavy D's personal space. He was then kept in a room separate from the other housemates for the night.
Day 8	Tasks	Frankie was given a secret task, to bring a little bit of Hollywood to Borehamwood. He had to pretend to be in a horror film, an action film and a musical. He successfully completed this task.
Day 9	Punishments	Lewis was told by Big Brother that the way he and fellow Housemates were acting in their dare games could be seen as bullying or out-casting other Housemates.; After James discussed nominations and Bear ate some of the luxury food won by the Artificials in the shopping task, both were sent to jail.
Day 9	Exits	Biggins was removed from the house for using offensive language.; Grant was evicted from the house, receiving the fewest votes to save.
Day 9	Twists	Following Grant's eviction, the Housemates had to vote for somebody to receive eternal nomination. Bear received the most votes and will therefore face every eviction in the series until he leaves.
Day 10	Nominations	The housemates nominated for the second time. Heavy D, Lewis and Saira received the most nominations and faced the public vote, along with Bear who is eternally nominated.
Day 11	Tasks	The housemates were given a large balloon to protect on their stomach and were told that if it was still intact at the end of the task they would attend a party. In fact, Marnie and Saira were on a secret mission to burst the balloons of the people they wanted at the party.
Day 12	Tasks	Big Brother gave Samantha a talent agency for a day. She had to choose four housemates to interview. Then she had to pick one she thought would benefit most from her wisdom and be her apprentice. She chose Katie.
Day 13	Exits	Saira was evicted from the house, receiving the fewest votes to save.
Day 13	Tasks	Housemates competed in a game of Nerve, where Big Brother tempted each housemate with a dare to complete. As 11 of 13 housemates were successful, they passed the task.
Day 13	Nominations	After surviving eviction, Bear, Heavy D and Lewis each had to make a killer nomination. They chose Renee, Marnie and James respectively; and they joined eternally nominated Bear in facing eviction.
Day 14	Nominations	During the "Big Risk" task, Renee won the right to save herself from nomination and replace herself with another housemate. She chose Chloe.
Day 14	Tasks	Aubrey and Frankie threw a party for all the housemates. The party items were won in a game of risk.
Day 15	Punishments	Aubrey was sent to jail for discussing nominations.
Day 16	Punishments	Lewis was sent to jail for discussing nominations.
Day 16	Tasks	For the final part of the shopping task, the housemates were given two money bags to hold for as long as possible, exceeding a mystery time chosen by Big Brother. However, for the real task, Samantha and Ricky had already secretly predicted that Lewis would be the strongest, and so the task rested in his hands. As Lewis held the bags for longer than the set time, the housemates won a luxury budget.
Day 16	Twists	The two housemates with the fewest votes; Chloe and Marnie, went head-to-head in a game of chance to determine who would be evicted. The housemates each voted for who they would like to leave, which would take up a proportion of a wheel. Chloe was evicted after the wheel landed on one of her sections.
Day 16	Exits	Chloe was evicted from the house.
Day 17	Nominations	The housemates nominated for the third time. Heavy D, Lewis and Renee received the most nominations and faced the public vote, along with Bear who is eternally nominated.
Day 17	Punishments	Heavy D and Bear were given a warning after making other housemates feel uncomfortable and pouring oil in the garden causing health and safety concerns.
Day 18	Tasks	The housemates were sent back to school with Big Brother as the headmaster, Ricky and Aubrey as head boy and head girl, and Samantha and Frankie as prefects. Over the course of the day the housemates attended lessons and followed rules set by Aubrey and Ricky. Failure to follow these rules would result in punishments set by Big Brother.
Day 20	Punishments	Lewis was given a formal and final warning for unacceptable behaviour the previous night.
Day 20	Exits	Heavy D was evicted from the house, receiving the fewest votes to save.
Day 20	Nominations	The housemates nominated for the fourth time. James, Lewis, Ricky and Samantha received the most nominations and faced the public vote, along with Bear who is eternally nominated.
Day 21	Tasks	As part of this week's shopping task, the housemates had to simply remain concentrated whilst Big Brother sent in distractions in the form of family, friends and pets.
Day 23	Tasks	The housemates competed against each other in a game of one-upping. Marnie was pronounced the greediest over Samantha, Katie most dramatic over Renee, Aubrey most real over James, Bear most brave over Lewis, and Frankie most outrageous over Ricky.
Day 23	Exits	Lewis and James were evicted from the house, receiving the fewest votes to save.
Day 24	Tasks	The housemates took part in a Christmas themed task with the Elves being Aubrey, Frankie, Marnie and Renee and the Reindeer being Bear, Katie, Ricky, and Samantha. The Elves and Reindeer went head-to-head in a series of festive challenges with the winners being able to nominate two housemates for eviction each, and the losers only being able to nominate one each.
Day 25	Nominations	The housemates nominated for the final time. Frankie, Katie, Marnie, Ricky and Samantha received the most nominations and faced the public vote, along with Bear who is eternally nominated.
Day 27	Punishments	As punishment for eating the pies won by the winners of the task, Katie and Bear were to be pied by the other housemates.
Day 27	Exits	Katie and Samantha were evicted from the house, receiving the fewest votes to save.
Day 28	Tasks	The housemates voted for each other in different award categories.
Day 30	Exits	Frankie left the house in sixth place, Aubrey left the house in fifth place, Marnie left the house in fourth place and Renee left the house in third place. It was then revealed that Bear was the winner, leaving Ricky as the runner-up.

== Production ==
=== Eye logo ===
The official eye logo for the series was released on 8 July 2016 when it was posted online by presenter Emma Willis. The eye is the same that was used in Big Brother 17 which was split, with black on one side and white on the other with shattered, coloured glass separating them down the middle, however the logo features a star in the middle to represent the celebrity series. On 15 July 2016 a revamped eye was revealed. The revamped eye is the same as the former eye, but now split into a gold half and a white half.

=== Teasers ===
On 19 July 2016, a brief 4-second "eye flash" aired on Channel 5 with the series eye logo emblazoned on a suitcase. On 21 July 2016, countdown adverts started airing with clues to the housemates identities, with the clues being "Beach bod", "Glamour puss", "National treasure", and "Iconic model".

=== Broadcasting ===
On 8 July 2016, it was confirmed that the spin-off show Bit on the Side would air an additional episode on Sunday nights on 5Star. Hour-long midnight live feed also returned for the series.

=== House ===
On 28 July 2016, Good Morning Britain toured the house and uploaded a 30-second video to their YouTube channel containing pictures of the kitchen area, stairs, bedroom and an empty living area. The sofa was confirmed to be Emerald Green.

The staircase was changed to gold along with the diary room door and walls. In the bedroom the gold theme continued and the carpet was changed to cream colour. The pod was also changed to a golden front with a red and orange theme inside. The bathroom was pretty much the same however all of the LED lighting was changed to a golden colour to complement the celebrity series.

== Ratings ==
	Official viewers (millions)				
	Week 1		Week 2	Week 3	Week 4
Saturday		2.00	1.87	1.83	1.62
Sunday		2.11	2.13	2.19	2.15
Monday		2.35	2.03	2.03	2.02
Tuesday		2.15	2.15	2.03	1.95
Wednesday		2.00	2.21	2.12	2.37
Thursday	2.71	2.31	2.29	2.30	2.21
Friday	2.13	2.23	2.05	1.97	2.14
Friday	2.13	1.87	2.05	1.64	2.14
Weekly average	2.19		2.10	2.01	2.07
Running average	2.19		2.15	2.10	2.09
Series average	2.1				
blue-coloured boxes denote live shows.
