= Storage Hunters =

Television series

- Starring: Sean Kelly
- Country of origin: United States
- Original language: English
- No. of seasons: US Series; 3 UK Series; 5 (Regular); 1 (Celebrity)
- No. of episodes: US Series; 73; UK Series; 50 (Regular); 6 (Celebrity)

Production
- Production locations: United States (2011–2013); United Kingdom (2014–2016)
- Running time: 21 minutes
- Production companies: T Group Productions & Hard Boiled Entertainment

Original release
- Network: TruTV
- Release: June 21, 2011 – December 17, 2013
- Network: Dave
- Release: October 28, 2014 – November 15, 2016

Storage Hunters is a reality television series presented by Sean Kelly (as the auctioneer). It originally ran in the United States from 2011 to 2013 on TruTV and has been shown in the UK on the digital channel Dave. A domestic UK version, also featuring Kelly, ran from 2014 to 2016.

The series has also been shown on New Zealand's TV3.

== Background ==
Sean Kelly grew up in Germany. After leaving school, he worked as a store detective before joining the Army, becoming a German interpreter, and then being stationed in Iraq. He then worked as an auctioneer, and compering comedy clubs at night. After a fight broke out at an auction, he came up with the idea for the show, describing it as "Antiques Roadshow meets WWF!"

The show was originally developed by S. Tobin Kirk, Kevin Lewis, Timothy Brown, and Juan Granja under their banner Hard Boiled Entertainment, which they founded while working together at a design and motion graphics company called Famer Brown in Venice, California. After shaping the concept and attending several storage auctions for research, Tobin connected with Sean Kelly, and together they entered into a production deal with The T-Group, who subsequently sold the series to TruTV.

== Format ==
For the US series, bidders Brandon and Lori Bernier. It continued with the Taylor Brothers, Jesse McClure, Tarrell "T-Money" Wright, Ron "Papa Bear" Kirkpatrick, Kashuna, Wade, FJ, Gary "Goal Machine" Madine, Scott and Chrissy Tassone, the Alvardo Brothers, "Desert Dan," Mone Smith, Will and Nick Eastwood, Soccer Mom and the lock cutters/security guards, Will C. (Season 1), Cameron "Green Mile" Rowe (Season 2-Season 3). The series was cancelled on TruTV after Season 3 ended.

In the UK and Ireland the show has been broadcast and repeated on the digital channel Dave. In 2014, Dave commissioned a spin-off series called Storage Hunters UK, featuring Kelly reprising his role as auctioneer with a series of UK bidders hunting for valuables across the UK. Dave renewed the UK version for two more series in 2015, with the second series beginning on 2 June and featuring US regulars Jesse and T-Money. Series 3 of the show premiered on 15 September 2015.

A fifth series was commissioned to air from April 2016, with Kelly returning alongside regular bidders from series 4.

A one-off UK celebrity special aired at Christmas 2015, with any money made being donated to the celebrity individual charities. This was followed by a series of 5 more celebrity episodes that aired at the end of 2016.

== Series overview ==
Series	Episodes	Originally released	
Series	Episodes	First released	Last released
US Series
Season 1	23	21 June 2011	September 2011
Season 2	24	June 2012	September 2012
Season 3	24	June 2013	17 December 2013
UK Series
Series 1	10	28 October 2014	30 December 2014
Series 2	10	2 June 2015	4 August 2015
Series 3	10	15 September 2015	17 November 2015
Series 4	10	24 November 2015	23 December 2015
Series 5	10	19 April 2016	21 June 2016
UK Celebrity Series
Christmas Special	1	20 December 2015	
Series 1	5	18 October 2016	15 November 2016

== Reception ==
The show has been well received in Britain, with the first episode of Storage Hunters UK being watched by over 1.1 million viewers, beating ratings for several prime time television shows broadcast that week.

The Guardian's Rhik Samadder described Kelly's auctioneering style "like someone has attached electrodes to a woodpecker". Tom Eames writing in Digital Spy described it as "one of the least authentic and most fake shows you will ever see, and comes under the umbrella of 'trashy reality' programmes that the US are very good at", but adding that "somehow, it is strangely addictive and enjoyable, and has clearly become a big guilty pleasure of many UK viewers."

Presenter Sean Kelly has attributed the success of the show to the participants' lack of social skills and compared it to "watching a carnival". In an interview for Digital Spy he speculated that the strong popularity of the show in the UK may lead to a revival of the US series.

== Buyers ==
=== Main Buyers US ===
Name	Nickname	Season		
Name	Nickname	1	2	3
Brandon Bernier and Lori Bernier	Team Brandori	Yes		
Jesse McClure	Jesse	Yes		
Tarrell Wright	T-Money	Yes		
Ronald Kirkpatrick	Papa Bear	Yes		
James and Dustin Taylor	The Taylor Brothers	Yes	Yes (Dustin only)	No
Scott and Chrissy Tassone	Scott and Chrissy	No	Yes	No
Mone Smith	FauxHawk	No		Yes

=== Main Buyers UK ===
Name	Nickname	Series				
Name	Nickname	1	2	3	4	5
John and Natalie Maddox	John and Natalie	Yes				
Colin Newell	Heavy D aka The Boominator	Yes				
Linda Lambert	Linda	Yes				
Daniel Hill	Dapper Dan	Yes				
Barry and Darren Elford	Barry and Darren	Yes				
George Johnson	George	Yes				

=== Main Celebrity Buyers UK ===
Name	Series
Name	1
Vic Reeves and Bob Mortimer	Yes
Charlotte Crosby and Holly Hagan	Yes
Theo Paphitis	Yes
Tim Vine	Yes
Nancy Dell'Olio	Yes
Bez & Shaun Ryder	Yes
Jenny Eclair and Lizzie Roper	Yes
Johnny Vegas	Yes
Katherine Ryan	Yes
Chris Kamara	Yes
Ainsley Harriott	Yes
Phil Tufnell	Yes
Janet Street-Porter	Yes
Ulrika Jonsson	Yes
Christopher Biggins	Yes

=== Minor Buyers US ===
Name	Season		
Name	1	2	3
Desert Dan	Yes		No
Wade Gallagher	Yes	No	
FJ	Yes	No	
Kashuna Perfected	Yes	No	
The Alvarado Brothers	No	Yes	No
Danarchy	No	No	Yes

=== Minor Buyers UK ===
Name	Series				
Name	1	2	3	4	5
Jesse McClure	No	Yes	No		
Tarrell Wright	No	Yes	No		
Samantha Bartlett	No	Yes			
Boudicca Scherazade	No	Yes			
Rupert	Yes		No		
Scotty	No	Yes			

== See also ==
- Auction Hunters, a similar show on Spike TV
- Storage Wars, a similar show on A&E TV
- Container Wars, a similar series on TruTV
