= Shipwrecked: Battle of the Islands 2008 =

- Season 3
- Presented by: Craig Kelly (narrator)
- No. of days: 105
- No. of castaways: 39
- Winner: Tigers
- Location: Moturakau and Rapota, Cook Islands, South Pacific
- No. of episodes: 30 (2 episodes per week)

Release
- Original network: Channel 4
- Original release: 13 April – 27 July 2008

Additional information
- Filming dates: September 2007 – January 2008

Season chronology
- ← Previous; Battle of the Islands 2007 Next → Battle of the Islands 2009

Shipwrecked: Battle Of The Islands 2008 is a United Kingdom reality television series which aired in 2008 on Channel 4's youth programming label T4. The 2008 series is the sixth series of Shipwrecked, and the third series to use the "Battle Of The Islands" format.

This series used a different process to determine the winning team. A third secret island known as Hawk Island was revealed to the other two islands in the final week when they returned to evaluate and vote for the team they felt had done a better job of welcoming them back. All the residents of Hawk (save for one) had been exiled from either the Sharks or the Tigers when they lost out to the other person in their new arrival pair.

== The Game ==
Shipwrecked is a reality programme in which a number of people from the UK live on one of two islands (Shark Island and Tiger Island) for a period of several months. Each week, new arrivals come to the islands, spend equal time on each island and must decide at the weekly beach party which island they wish to live on for the remainder of the competition. At the end of the series, the island with the most castaways wins, with the winning islanders sharing a cash prize of £100,000. The winning island with 21 members was the Tigers; the Sharks had 14 members.

For Shipwrecked 2008, a new twist was introduced. Each week two new arrivals to the competition spend an equal amount of time on each island and make their decision on which island they wish to permanently live on. However, the chosen island could only select one new arrival to keep and make an official Tiger or Shark, with the other new arrival "sent home". Contrary to what the islanders believe, the "rejected" new arrival is sent to a secret third island hidden away from Shark and Tiger islands. The third island acts as a survival island, whereby those who decide to stay must survive on basic conditions, with no luxuries, no protein (except for the island's wildlife), with no knowledge of the role they would later play in the competition.

== Television programmes ==
In addition to the main programme, two companion shows were broadcast for the 2008 series. Shipwrecked: The Third Island followed the week's events on Hawk Island, including the arrival of the newly rejected castaway from Tiger and Shark Islands, and the goings-on on "Hawk Island". Shipwrecked: The Hutcam Diaries supplemented the events of the main programme by focusing on the castaway's daily lives, and tribulations, from the point of view of the islands' hutcam.

== Main Islands ==
In Week One, six castaways (Danny, Faith, Barrie, Katie, James and Lara) set foot on Shark island, who, two days later, were joined by another six castaways (Tom, Carly, Jack, Char, Marvyn and Susan). Although initially confused by the arrival of more people onto their island, the original islanders and their guests quickly settled into island life. However, only a matter of days into the competition, Katie, one of the original six, decided to leave the competition to be later replaced by Keris, 26.

At the end of the first week, the inaugural beach party was held. The twelve castaways were instructed to split into two equal sized groups. The islanders decided to remain in their groups of six based on those whom they arrived with, despite the disapproval of Tom who had wished to remain on the same island as Danny, one of the first six on the island. The groups later decided which group would be Tigers and which group would become the Sharks, with the first islanders (Barrie, Danny, Faith, James, Keris, and Lara) becoming the Sharks, and the second group of islanders becoming the Tigers (Carly, Char, Jack, Marvyn, Susan and Tom). However, in a shocking twist, the newly formed tribes were provided with only five tribal necklaces each, revealing the twist that one of the original castaways in each tribe would have to leave the competition, and make the long journey back to the UK. After much deliberation, both tribes decided to make their decision on whom to send home by randomly picking sticks. As a result, James from the Sharks tribe and Char from the Tigers tribe were eliminated and left the island, believing they were returning to the United Kingdom. The remaining castaways were left uncertain about what would follow, as no further arrivals occurred after the beach party.

The next day two boats were spotted by Adam in the distance with the 13 inhabitants from the secret third island heading towards Tiger Island and Shark Island. The seven girls visited the Shark's first and the six boys go over to Tiger Island.

The Sharks entertained the girls to a game called donkey derby. Meanwhile, over on Tiger Island the six lads played football. When the new arrivals swap islands, the Tigers were excited to see fellow original Char, as were the Sharks with original James.

With the day of the final beach party looming, the new arrivals all discussed the difficulty of making a tough decision on which island they would choose at the final Shipwrecked Beach Party on 20 July.

| Sharks | | | Tigers | | |
| Member | Arrival Week | Original Tribe | Original Tribe | Arrival Week | Member |
| Barrie Ridley; 24, Isle of Sheppey | 1 | Shark | Tiger | 1 | Carly Stratton; 18, Cheshire |
| Danny Latimer; 23, Liverpool | 1 | Shark | Tiger | 1 | Jack Collins; 19, Essex |
| Lara Goodison; 18, Surrey | 1 | Shark | Tiger | 1 | Marvyn Williams; 26, Leeds |
| Adam Child; 23, London | 2 | Shark | Tiger | 1 | Susan Shaw; 20, Liverpool |
| Lauren Humphrey; 21, London | 3 | Shark | Tiger | 4 | Matt Iovane; 23, Hertfordshire; Graduate |
| Tom Turner; 18, Sussex | 1 | Tiger | Tiger | 5 | Vicky Boast; 24, Nottingham |
| Anna Morris-Ord; 20, Manchester | 6 | Shark | Tiger | 7 | Ricky Andrews; 22, Essex |
| Jamie Davison-Lungley; 18, London | 8 | Shark | Tiger | 9 | Josh Rivers; 21, London/Atlanta |
| Sarahmae Davison; 21, Hull | 10 | Shark | Tiger | 11 | Jonathan Hewston; 20, Leicester |
| Faith Oyegun; 18, Oxford | 1 | Shark | | | |
| Nathan Lawler; 21, Manchester | 13 | Shark | | | |
| Keris Hopkins; 26, Wales | 1 | Shark | | | |
| Rebecca Collings; 26, London | 12 | Tiger | | | |

== Third Island ==
On the conclusion of the weekly beach party, the person(s) not selected to stay on the main islands are sent to a third island unbeknownst to those in the game. The third island itself is very different from Tiger and Shark islands. The island is harsher, denser, and surrounded by a hostile reef.

The Third Island inhabitants (the self-proclaimed Hawk tribe) were stripped of luxuries and were given minimal rations, with any dietary protein provided by hunting after the island's wildlife, including three pigs and a number of chickens. To assist in their survival, Nick Weston, a survival expert, helped the new arrivals adjust to the tougher conditions.

Hawks
| Member | Week Arrived On Main Island | Week Sent To Third Island | Original Tribe | Tribe They Chose To Win |
| Nick Weston; 25, Sussex | Inaugural Member | | Hawk | Tiger |
| Char Counsell; 23, Somerset | 1 | 2 | Tiger | Tiger |
| James Ward; 23, Northampton | 1 | 2 | Shark | Tiger |
| Diva Morthor; 19, Essex | 3 | 4 | Shark | Tiger |
| Mike McHale; 23, London | 4 | 5 | Tiger | Tiger |
| Lottie Moore; 22, Cheshire | 6 | 7 | Shark | Tiger |
| Rowan Bailey; 26, Chichester | 7 | 8 | Tiger | Tiger |
| Adelina Ekechukwu; 22, Manchester | 8 | 9 | Shark | Tiger |
| Beau Devonish-Inua; 27, Essex | 9 | 10 | Tiger | Tiger |
| Brie Doffing; 19, Berkshire | 11 | 12 | Tiger | Tiger |
| Sarah Collings; 26, London | 12 | 13 | Tiger | Tiger |
| Sarah Sole; 23, Devon | 13 | 14 | Shark | Tiger |
| Joseph Cooper; 19, Shrewsbury | 13 | 14 | Shark | Shark |

== Departed Castaways ==
After just two days on the island, homesick Katie left the production, being replaced by 26-year-old Welsh girl, Keris. Michael also left after spending a day on the third island, after complaining of feeling homesick. Sarah later left Hawk island after complaining of headaches.

| Name | Arrival Week | Week Departed | Original Tribe | Tribe When Left | Reason for Leaving |
|---|---|---|---|---|---|
| Katie Bloomer; 19, Newcastle upon Tyne, Mortgage Advisor | 1 | 1 | Shark | | Homesick |
| Michael Cumberbatch; 26, Coventry, Shop Assistant | 5 | 5 | Tiger | Hawk | Homesick |
| Sarah Henderson; 19, London; Student | 2 | 6 | Shark | Hawk | Unwell |
| Dale Robertson; 21, Edinburgh; Student | 10 | 11 | Shark | Hawk | Homesick |
