= Shipwrecked: The Island =

British reality television series

- Presented by: Craig Kelly (narrator)
- No. of days: 65
- No. of castaways: 12
- Winner: Kate Davies
- Runners-up: Ashlie Robinson; Micah Gill ("Brimes")
- Location: Cook Islands, South Pacific
- No. of episodes: 15, each depicting one week

Release
- Original network: E4
- Original release: 23 October 2011 – 31 January 2012

Additional information
- Filming dates: August 2011 – October 2011

Season chronology
- ← Previous; Battle of the Islands 2009 Next → Battle of the Islands 2019

Shipwrecked: The Island is a British reality television series and is the second revival of the Shipwrecked format. The 2011–12 series is the eighth overall in the Shipwrecked series. The Island has a different format from the Battle of the Islands series, consisting of only one tribe of 10 people living together on one island.

The revival of the series was announced by Channel 4 on 19 May 2011 with a 15-episode run and a back-to-basics theme, instead of Battle of the Islands, confirmed. Casting took place over the following months; with filming taking place between August and October 2011.

The series began on 23 October 2011 and was aired at 8pm on Tuesdays on E4 until 31 January 2012, there was no episode broadcast on 20 December 2011.

== Contestants ==
Name	Age	Occupation	Hometown
Flora Bradley-Watson	22	Politics graduate	Dorset
Anna Watts	24	Underwear Model	London
Tristan "The Bruhmome" Tate	23	Kickboxer	Luton
Joseph “Tam Junior” Richardson	21	Student/Barman	Rotherham
Stephen Bear ("Bear")	21	Roofer	Walthamstow, London
Kitten	21	Filmmaker/Hairdresser	Wirral
Danni Mannix	22	Criminal Justice Graduate	Essex
Dominique James	23	Retail Assistant	London
Micah Gill ("Brimes")	20	MC and YouTube star	Croydon
Kate Davies	23	Events Manager	London
Ashlie Robinson	21	Media Graduate	Manchester
Salema Radford	21	Medical Student	Norwich

== Voting history ==
Key:

This contestant was the winner and won £5,000
This contestant was voted Island Leader

	Week 1		Week 2		Week 3	Week 4	Week 5		Week 6	Week 7	Week 8		Week 9	Week 10	Week 11	Week 12		
	Week 1		Week 2		Week 3	Week 4	Week 5		Week 6	Week 7	Week 8		Week 9	Week 10	Week 11	Week 12	Week 13	No. of Beads
Leader	Kate	Tristan	Tie	Kitten	Anna	Brimes	Tie	Dominique	Kate	Bear	Tie	Carl	Tristan	Dominique	Anna	Ashlie	None	
Kate	No Vote	Flora	Kitten	Kitten	Anna	Brimes	Dominique	Dominique	Ashlie	Bear	Anna	Carl	N/A	Anna	N/A	Ashlie	Kate	5
Ashlie	Not on Island					Kate	Danni	Danni	Kate	unknown	Carl	Carl	N/A	Kate	Kate	N/A	Ashlie	4
Brimes	No Vote	Tristan	Danni	Danni	Anna	Dominique	Tristan	Dominique	Kate	Anna	Bear	Dominique	Tristan	Dominique	Anna	Ashlie	Dominique	4
Anna	No Vote	Tristan	Kitten	Kitten	Brimes	Bear	Dominique	Dominique	Kate	Bear	Dominique	Dominique	Tristan	Dominique	Bear	Ashlie	Bear	3
Bear	No Vote	Tristan	Kitten	Kitten	Anna	Brimes	Dominique	Danni	Tristan	Anna	Dominique	Carl	Tristan	Dominique	Anna	Ashlie	Anna	2
Carl	Not on Island									unknown	Tristan	None	Kate	N/A	N/A	N/A	Ashlie	1
Dominique	No Vote	Tristan	Danni	Danni	Anna	Brimes	Danni	None	Kate	Bear	Tristan	None	Tristan	Anna	Anna	Ashlie	Brimes	1
Salema	Not on Island									Dominique	Dominique	N/A	Tristan	Dominique	Anna	N/A	Kate	0
Tristan	No Vote	Flora	Anna	Kitten	Brimes	Brimes	Bear	Dominique	Bear	Bear	Brimes	Dominique	N/A	Dominique	Anna	Salema	Brimes	1
Danni	No Vote	Brimes	Anna	None	Dominique	Tristan	Bear	None	N/A	unknown	Carl	Carl	N/A	Kate	N/A	Walked (Week 12)		1
Joseph	No Vote	Tristan	Danni	Danni	Danni	Danni	Lost right to vote		Bear	Danni	Carl	Carl	Walked (Week 9)					0
Kitten	No Vote	Flora	Bear	None	Danni	Joseph	Danni	N/A	Kate	Bear	Walked (Week 8)							0
Flora	No Vote	Kitten	Walked (Week 2)															0

=== Notes ===
- Danni was given a bead in Week 4 by new arrival Ashlie as part of her introductory task.
- In week 5, Joseph lost his right to vote for removing his necklace which was against island rules.
- In the week 5 re-vote, Kitten had no need to vote as a majority decision had already been made making Dominique the new Island Leader.
- In the week 6 vote, Danni was not required to vote as a majority decision had already been made making Kate the new Island Leader.
- In week 7 the new arrivals, Carl and Salema had the power to take someone's necklace, they took Kate's and Anna's respectively. Week 7 also saw the start of a new twist. The outgoing leader now has the power to take someone's bead, who they think is undeserving and give it to someone who they think is deserving. Kate took Kitten's bead and gave it to Ashlie.
- In week 8, Bear took Danni's bead and gave it to Anna. As the first act of his leadership, Carl had to pick three people to send to the "other island" on a raft the next morning for 48 hours where they would have a decision to make - take and allocate three red beads or take a box containing luxury items. He chose Anna, Brimes and Joe.
- In week 9, Ashlie, Danni, Kate and Tristan were not required to vote as there was already a majority. Carl took Tristan's bead and gave it to Ashlie, due to him not taking part in Carl's week. Also, due to a rule-break when Bear and Dominique swum to the "other island" to meet Anna and Brimes, Carl had the power to reallocate their beads, giving them to Kate and Danni respectively.
- In week 10, Carl was not required to vote as there was already a majority. Tristan took one of Carl's beads and gave it to Bear.
- In week 11, Carl, Danni and Kate were not required to vote as there was already a majority. Dominique took one of Carl's beads and gave it to Brimes.
- In week 12, Only three people - Ashlie, Danni and Salema were eligible to stand as only people who had not been leader already could stand. Ashlie, Carl and Salema were not required to vote as there was already a majority. Anna took one of Ashlie's beads and gave it to Bear.
- In week 13, Tristan found a lighter - an explicitly banned item on Shipwrecked - in Bear's bag, for which Bear was required to give up one of his beads. In the final vote, each person's beads corresponded to their number of initial shells. Only people who had been leader were eligible to win, which meant that Salema was the only person who could not win. Ashlie as outgoing leader was required to take a shell from someone and reallocate it - she chose Tristan to lose his shell and gave it to Kate. Salema was required to give her shell away as she was ineligible to win - she also gave it to Kate.
- After 13 weeks on the island Kate became the winner with 5 red beads.
