= 2014 in film =

The following is an overview of the events of 2014 in film, including the highest-grossing films, award ceremonies, festivals, and a list of films released and notable deaths.

== Evaluation of the year ==
In his article highlighting the best films of 2014, Richard Brody of The New Yorker stated,

The great surge in American filmmaking in the past ten years is due to independent financing at all levels. The American independent cinema is right now the flower of the world, but independence isn't in itself a merit badge. Artistically, the films in question range from the majestic to the meretricious. Independent financing has set truly imaginative directors into free flight. This is a moment of extraordinary cinematic invention—of filmmakers, working at a wide range of budget levels, coming up with original and personal ideas about movies and how to make them. On the other hand, this independent surge has also created a new class of culturally respectable directors and films, an ostensible art cinema that flows into the mainstream. True independent filmmaking has always been a tough proposition in the marketplace, let alone at the multiplex. Its commercial obstacles are an increasing problem even for established professionals, who now take their place alongside street-level independents. Filmmakers rightly worry that it's becoming more difficult than ever to make a salable movie, to make a living making movies. If films are becoming like books, where the artistically ambitious ones are only rarely big hits, then directors working outside Hollywood will become more and more like novelists, who often need to supplement their income with teaching or other outside jobs. As independent films become increasingly marginalized in the marketplace, this loss of status risks marginalizing critics as well—which is why the re-professionalization of the movie business has become a matter of critical advocacy.

== Highest-grossing films ==
The top 10 films released in 2014 by worldwide gross are as follows:

Highest-grossing films of 2014
| Rank | Title | Distributor | Worldwide gross |
|---|---|---|---|
| 1 | Transformers: Age of Extinction | Paramount | $1,104,054,072 |
| 2 | The Hobbit: The Battle of the Five Armies | Warner Bros. | $962,201,338 |
| 3 | Guardians of the Galaxy | Disney | $772,776,600 |
| 4 | Maleficent | Disney | $758,410,378 |
| 5 | The Hunger Games: Mockingjay – Part 1 | Lionsgate | $755,356,711 |
| 6 | X-Men: Days of Future Past | 20th Century Fox | $746,045,700 |
| 7 | Captain America: The Winter Soldier | Disney | $714,421,503 |
| 8 | Dawn of the Planet of the Apes | 20th Century Fox | $710,644,566 |
| 9 | The Amazing Spider-Man 2 | Sony | $708,982,323 |
| 10 | Interstellar | Paramount / Warner Bros. | $677,896,797 (Note: Excludes grosses from subsequent re-releases.) |

=== Box office records ===
- Transformers: Age of Extinction grossed more than $1.1 billion, becoming the 10th highest-grossing film of all time.
- PK became the first Indian movie to gross more than $100 million at the box office.
- 2014 was also the first year since 1997 in which there were no animated movies among the 10 highest-grossing films of the year. However, the 11th and 12th highest grossing films of this year, Big Hero 6 and How to Train Your Dragon 2 respectively, are both animated.

== Events ==
=== Award ceremonies ===
| Date | Event | Host | Location | Source |
|---|---|---|---|---|
| January 10 | 3rd AACTA International Awards | Australian Academy of Cinema and Television Arts | West Hollywood, California | |
| January 12 | 71st Golden Globe Awards | Hollywood Foreign Press Association | Beverly Hills, California | |
| January 16 | 19th Critics' Choice Awards | Broadcast Film Critics Association | Santa Monica, California | |
| January 18 | 20th Screen Actors Guild Awards | Screen Actors Guild-American Federation of Television and Radio Artists | Los Angeles, California | |
| January 19 | Producers Guild of America Awards 2013 | Producers Guild of America | Beverly Hills, California | |
| January 20 | 49th Guldbagge Awards | Swedish Film Institute | Stockholm, Sweden | |
| January 25 | 66th Directors Guild of America Awards | Directors Guild of America | Los Angeles, California | |
| February 1 | 4th Magritte Awards | Académie André Delvaux | Brussels, Belgium | |
| February 1 | Writers Guild of America Awards 2013 | Writers Guild of America | Los Angeles, California | |
| February 9 | 28th Goya Awards | Academy of Cinematographic Arts and Sciences of Spain | Madrid, Spain | |
| February 15 | 64th Golden Bear Awards | Berlin International Film Festival | Berlin, Germany | |
| February 16 | 67th British Academy Film Awards | British Academy of Film and Television Arts | London, England | |
| February 23 | 18th Satellite Awards | International Press Academy | Century City, California | |
| February 26 | 39th César Awards | Academy of Cinema Arts and Techniques | Paris, France | |
| March 1 | 29th Independent Spirit Awards | Independent Spirit Awards | Santa Monica, California | |
| March 1 | 34th Golden Raspberry Awards | The Golden Raspberry Award Foundation | Los Angeles, California | |
| March 2 | 86th Academy Awards | Academy of Motion Picture Arts and Sciences | Los Angeles, California | |
| March 24 | 8th Gopo Awards | Association for Romanian Film Promotion | Bucharest, Romania | |
| March 30 | 19th Empire Awards | Empire | London, England | |
| April 5 | 11th Irish Film & Television Awards | Irish Film and Television Academy | Dublin, Leinster, Republic of Ireland | |
| April 13 | 2014 MTV Movie Awards | MTV | Los Angeles, California | |
| April 19 | 44th Kerala State Film Awards | Kerala State Chalachitra Academy | Thiruvananthapuram, Kerala, India | |
| April 26 | 15th IIFA Awards | International Indian Film Academy Awards | Tampa Bay, Florida | |
| May 3 | 61st National Film Awards | Directorate of Film Festivals | India | |
| June 26 | 40th Saturn Awards | Academy of Science Fiction, Fantasy & Horror Films | Burbank, California | |
| July 13 | 2014 FAMAS Awards | Filipino Academy of Movie Arts and Sciences Awards | Parañaque, Philippines | |
| December 13 | 27th European Film Awards | European Film Academy | Riga, Latvia | |

=== Festivals ===
| Date | Event | Host | Location | Source |
|---|---|---|---|---|
| January 16–26 | 2014 Sundance Film Festival | Sundance Institute | Park City, Utah | |
| February 6–16 | 64th Berlin International Film Festival | Berlin International Film Festival | Berlin, Germany | |
| May 14–25 | 2014 Cannes Film Festival | Cannes Film Festival | Cannes, France | |
| August 15–23 | 2014 Sarajevo Film Festival | Sarajevo Film Festival | Sarajevo, Bosnia | |
| August 27 – September 6 | 71st Venice International Film Festival | Venice Biennale | Venice, Italy | |
| September 4–14 | 2014 Toronto International Film Festival | Toronto International Film Festival | Toronto, Ontario | |
| November 14–30 | 18th Tallinn Black Nights Film Festival | Tallinn Black Nights Film Festival | Tallinn, Estonia | |
| December 25 – January 8, 2015 | 2014 Metro Manila Film Festival | Metro Manila Film Festival | Metro Manila, Philippines | |

== Awards ==
| Category/Organization | 72nd Golden Globe Awards January 11, 2015 | | 20th Critics' Choice Awards January 15, 2015 | Producers, Directors, Screen Actors, and Writers Guild Awards | 68th BAFTA Awards February 8, 2015 | 87th Academy Awards February 22, 2015 |
| Category/Organization | Drama | Musical or Comedy | 20th Critics' Choice Awards January 15, 2015 | Producers, Directors, Screen Actors, and Writers Guild Awards | 68th BAFTA Awards February 8, 2015 | 87th Academy Awards February 22, 2015 |
|---|---|---|---|---|---|---|
| Best Film | Boyhood | The Grand Budapest Hotel | Boyhood | Birdman | Boyhood | Birdman |
| Best Director | Richard Linklater; Boyhood | | | Alejandro G. Iñárritu; Birdman | Richard Linklater; Boyhood | Alejandro G. Iñárritu; Birdman |
| Best Actor | Eddie Redmayne; The Theory of Everything | Michael Keaton; Birdman | | Eddie Redmayne; The Theory of Everything | | |
| Best Actress | Julianne Moore; Still Alice | Amy Adams; Big Eyes | Julianne Moore; Still Alice | | | |
| Best Supporting Actor | J. K. Simmons; Whiplash | | | | | |
| Best Supporting Actress | Patricia Arquette; Boyhood | | | | | |
| Best Screenplay, Adapted | Alejandro G. Iñárritu Nicolás Giacobone, Alexander Dinelaris Jr., and Armando Bo; Birdman | | Gillian Flynn; Gone Girl | Graham Moore; The Imitation Game | Anthony McCarten; The Theory of Everything | Graham Moore; The Imitation Game |
| Best Screenplay, Original | Alejandro G. Iñárritu Nicolás Giacobone, Alexander Dinelaris Jr., and Armando Bo; Birdman | | Alejandro G. Iñárritu and Armando Bo; Birdman | Wes Anderson; The Grand Budapest Hotel | | Alejandro G. Iñárritu, Nicolás Giacobone, Alexander Dinelaris Jr., and Armando Bo; Birdman |
| Best Animated Film | How to Train Your Dragon 2 | | The Lego Movie | | | Big Hero 6 |
| Best Original Score | The Theory of Everything; Jóhann Jóhannsson | | Birdman; Antonio Sánchez | —N/a | The Grand Budapest Hotel; Alexandre Desplat | |
| Best Original Song | "Glory"; Selma | | | —N/a | —N/a | "Glory"; Selma |
| Best Foreign Language Film | Leviathan | | Force Majeure | —N/a | Ida | |
| Best Documentary | —N/a | | Life Itself | | Citizenfour | |

Palme d'Or (67th Cannes Film Festival):

Winter Sleep (Kış Uykusu), directed by Nuri Bilge Ceylan, Turkey

Golden Lion (71st Venice International Film Festival):

A Pigeon Sat on a Branch Reflecting on Existence (En duva satt på en gren och funderade på tillvaron), directed by Roy Andersson, Sweden

Golden Bear (64th Berlin International Film Festival):

Black Coal, Thin Ice (白日焰火), directed by Diao Yinan, China

== 2014 films ==
=== By country/region ===
- List of American films of 2014
- List of Argentine films of 2014
- List of Australian films of 2014
- List of Bangladeshi films of 2014
- List of Brazilian films of 2014
- List of British films of 2014
- List of Canadian films of 2014
- List of Chinese films of 2014
- List of French films of 2014
- List of Hong Kong films of 2014
- List of Indian films of 2014
  - List of Assamese films of 2014
  - List of Bengali films of 2014
  - List of Bollywood films of 2014
  - List of Odia films of 2014
  - List of Punjabi films of 2014
  - List of Gujarati films
  - List of Kannada films of 2014
  - List of Malayalam films of 2014
  - List of Marathi films of 2014
  - List of Tamil films of 2014
  - List of Telugu films of 2014
  - List of Tulu films of 2014
- List of Indonesian films
- List of Iraqi films of 2014
- List of Italian films of 2014
- List of Japanese films of 2014
- List of Mexican films of 2014
- List of Pakistani films of 2014
- List of Russian films of 2014
- List of South Korean films of 2014
- List of Spanish films of 2014
- List of Turkish films of 2014

=== By genre/medium ===
- List of action films of 2014
- List of animated feature films of 2014
- List of avant-garde films of 2014
- List of comedy films of 2014
- List of drama films of 2014
- List of horror films of 2014
- List of science fiction films of 2014
- List of thriller films of 2014
- List of western films of 2014

== Deaths ==
| Month | Date | Name | Age | Country | Profession | Notable films |
|---|---|---|---|---|---|---|
| January | 1 | Juanita Moore | 99 | US | Actress | Imitation of Life; The Singing Nun |
| January | 2 | Bernard Glasser | 89 | US | Producer, Director | Return of the Fly; The Day of the Triffids |
| January | 3 | Saul Zaentz | 92 | US | Producer | One Flew Over the Cuckoo's Nest; Amadeus |
| January | 5 | Carmen Zapata | 86 | US | Actress | Sister Act; Point of No Return |
| January | 6 | Larry D. Mann | 91 | Canada | Actor | In the Heat of the Night; The Sting |
| January | 7 | Run Run Shaw | 106 | China | Producer | Blade Runner; The 36th Chamber of Shaolin |
| January | 11 | Jophery Brown | 68 | US | Stuntman | Predator; Jurassic Park |
| January | 11 | Arnoldo Foà | 97 | Italy | Actor | The Shoes of the Fisherman; The Trial |
| January | 12 | Alexandra Bastedo | 67 | UK | Actress | Batman Begins; Casino Royale |
| January | 12 | Frank Marth | 91 | US | Actor | Madigan; Telefon |
| January | 14 | Richard Shepherd | 86 | US | Producer | Breakfast at Tiffany's; The Hunger |
| January | 15 | Roger Lloyd-Pack | 69 | UK | Actor | Harry Potter and the Goblet of Fire; Tinker Tailor Soldier Spy |
| January | 16 | Harvey Bernhard | 89 | US | Producer | The Omen; The Goonies |
| January | 16 | Russell Johnson | 89 | US | Actor | MacArthur; This Island Earth |
| January | 16 | Hal Sutherland | 84 | US | Animator, Director | Pinocchio and the Emperor of the Night; Journey Back to Oz |
| January | 18 | Sarah Marshall | 80 | UK | Actress | The Long, Hot Summer; Wild and Wonderful |
| January | 19 | Gordon Hessler | 88 | Germany | Director | The Oblong Box; The Girl in a Swing |
| January | 19 | Ben Starr | 92 | US | Screenwriter | Our Man Flint; Texas Across the River |
| January | 20 | James Jacks | 66 | US | Producer | The Mummy; Dazed and Confused |
| January | 22 | Luis Ávalos | 67 | Cuba | Actor | Jungle 2 Jungle; The Ringer |
| January | 22 | Carlo Mazzacurati | 57 | Italy | Director, Screenwriter | Italian Night; The Right Distance |
| January | 23 | Riz Ortolani | 87 | Italy | Composer | The Yellow Rolls-Royce; Day of Anger |
| January | 24 | Lisa Daniely | 84 | UK | Actress | Lilli Marlene; The Man in the Road |
| January | 26 | Margery Mason | 100 | UK | Actress | The Princess Bride; Love Actually |
| January | 27 | Ann Carter | 77 | US | Actress | The Two Mrs. Carrolls; The Curse of the Cat People |
| January | 28 | John Cacavas | 83 | US | Composer | Airport 1975; The Satanic Rites of Dracula |
| January | 28 | Tom Sherak | 68 | US | Studio Executive | |
| January | 30 | Campbell Lane | 78 | Canada | Actor | Scary Movie 4; Needful Things |
| January | 30 | William Motzing | 76 | US | Composer | Cappuccino; A Case of Honor |
| January | 30 | Arthur Rankin Jr. | 89 | US | Director, Producer | The Last Unicorn; The King and I |
| January | 31 | Miklós Jancsó | 92 | Hungary | Director, Screenwriter | Hungarian Rhapsody; Private Vices, Public Pleasures |
| January | 31 | Christopher Jones | 72 | US | Actor | Ryan's Daughter; Wild in the Streets |
| February | 1 | Maximilian Schell | 83 | Austria | Actor | Judgment at Nuremberg; Deep Impact |
| February | 2 | Philip Seymour Hoffman | 46 | US | Actor | Capote; Doubt |
| February | 2 | Craig Lahiff | 66 | Australia | Director | Black and White; Heaven's Burning |
| February | 9 | Gabriel Axel | 95 | Denmark | Director, Screenwriter | Babette's Feast; Hagbard and Signe |
| February | 9 | Eric Bercovici | 80 | US | Screenwriter | Take a Hard Ride; Hell in the Pacific |
| February | 10 | Ronnie Masterson | 87 | Ireland | Actress | Angela's Ashes; Byzantium |
| February | 10 | Shirley Temple | 85 | US | Actress, Singer | Heidi; The Little Princess |
| February | 12 | Sid Caesar | 91 | US | Actor | Grease; It's a Mad, Mad, Mad, Mad World |
| February | 13 | Ralph Waite | 85 | US | Actor | The Bodyguard; Five Easy Pieces |
| February | 14 | Remo Capitani | 86 | Italy | Actor | The Grand Duel; Ace High |
| February | 14 | Robert M. Fresco | 83 | US | Screenwriter | The Monolith Monsters; Tarantula |
| February | 15 | Mary Grace Canfield | 89 | US | Actress | Pollyanna; Something Wicked This Way Comes |
| February | 15 | Christopher Malcolm | 67 | UK | Actor | The Empire Strikes Back; Highlander |
| February | 16 | Jimmy T. Murakami | 80 | US | Animator, Director | When the Wind Blows; Battle Beyond the Stars |
| February | 18 | Joy Todd | 78–79 | US | Casting Director | Rambo III; Gettysburg |
| February | 20 | Roger Hill | 65 | US | Actor | The Warriors; The Education of Sonny Carson |
| February | 24 | Harold Ramis | 69 | US | Actor, Director, Producer, Screenwriter | Ghostbusters; Groundhog Day |
| March | 1 | Alain Resnais | 91 | France | Director, Screenwriter | Hiroshima mon amour; Last Year at Marienbad |
| March | 2 | Gail Gilmore | 76 | Canada | Actress, Dancer | Girl Happy; Harum Scarum |
| March | 2 | Stanley Rubin | 96 | US | Producer, Screenwriter | Revenge; River of No Return |
| March | 3 | Curtis McClarin | 44 | US | Actor | The Happening; Private Parts |
| March | 5 | Scott Kalvert | 49 | US | Director | The Basketball Diaries; Deuces Wild |
| March | 6 | Sheila MacRae | 93 | UK | Actress | Caged; Backfire |
| March | 8 | Wendy Hughes | 61 | Australia | Actress | Paradise Road; My Brilliant Career |
| March | 10 | Patricia Laffan | 94 | UK | Actress | Quo Vadis; Devil Girl from Mars |
| March | 12 | Richard Coogan | 99 | US | Actor | The Revolt of Mamie Stover; Vice Raid |
| March | 12 | Raymond Wagner | 85 | US | Producer, Executive | Turner & Hooch; Code of Silence |
| March | 13 | Abby Singer | 96 | US | Production Manager | Out of Sight; Thunderbolt and Lightfoot |
| March | 17 | Oswald Morris | 98 | UK | Cinematographer | Fiddler on the Roof; The Wiz |
| March | 21 | James Rebhorn | 65 | US | Actor | Scent of a Woman; Independence Day |
| March | 22 | Patrice Wymore | 87 | US | Actress | Ocean's 11; Tea for Two |
| March | 28 | Lorenzo Semple Jr. | 91 | US | Screenwriter | Three Days of the Condor; Flash Gordon |
| March | 29 | Marc Platt | 100 | US | Actor, Dancer | Oklahoma!; Down to Earth |
| March | 30 | Kate O'Mara | 74 | UK | Actress | The Vampire Lovers; The Horror of Frankenstein |
| March | 31 | David Hannay | 75 | Australia | Producer | The Man from Hong Kong; Stone |
| April | 2 | Richard Brick | 68 | US | Producer | Sweet and Lowdown; Celebrity |
| April | 2 | Everett De Roche | 67 | Australia | Screenwriter | Patrick; Long Weekend |
| April | 5 | John Pinette | 50 | US | Actor | The Punisher; Junior |
| April | 5 | José Wilker | 69 | Brazil | Actor | Dona Flor and Her Two Husbands; Medicine Man |
| April | 6 | Mary Anderson | 96 | US | Actress | Gone with the Wind; Lifeboat |
| April | 6 | Mickey Rooney | 93 | US | Actor | The Black Stallion; Babes in Arms |
| April | 7 | Claudine Bouché | 88 | France | Film Editor | Jules and Jim; Shoot the Piano Player |
| April | 9 | Gil Askey | 89 | US | Composer | Lady Sings the Blues; Mahogany |
| April | 11 | Darrell Zwerling | 85 | US | Actor | Chinatown; Grease |
| April | 14 | Ingeborg von Kusserow | 95 | Germany | Actress | Captain Horatio Hornblower; Across the Bridge |
| April | 17 | Anthony Marriott | 83 | UK | Screenwriter | No Sex Please, We're British; The Deadly Bees |
| April | 17 | Gabriel García Márquez | 87 | Colombia | Screenwriter | El año de la peste; Eréndira |
| April | 21 | Craig Hill | 88 | US | Actor | The Black Shield of Falworth; All About Eve |
| April | 29 | Bob Hoskins | 71 | UK | Actor, Director | Who Framed Roger Rabbit; Mona Lisa |
| April | 30 | Judi Meredith | 77 | US | Actress | Jack the Giant Killer; Dark Intruder |
| May | 1 | Assi Dayan | 68 | Israel | Actor | A Walk with Love and Death; Promise at Dawn |
| May | 1 | Howard Smith | 77 | US | Documentarian | Gizmo!; Marjoe |
| May | 2 | Efrem Zimbalist, Jr. | 95 | US | Actor | Wait Until Dark; Batman: Mask of the Phantasm |
| May | 3 | Leslie Carlson | 81 | US | Actor | A Christmas Story; Videodrome |
| May | 5 | Jackie Lynn Taylor | 87 | US | Actress | Our Gang; Babes in Toyland |
| May | 6 | Virginia Belmont | 92 | US | Actress | Dangers of the Canadian Mounted; Johnny Angel |
| May | 6 | William Olvis | 56 | US | Composer | Steal Big Steal Little; Red Rock West |
| May | 7 | Tony Genaro | 72 | US | Actor | Tremors; The Mask of Zorro |
| May | 8 | Beverly Long | 81 | US | Actress | Rebel Without a Cause; The Green-Eyed Blonde |
| May | 11 | Barbara Knudson | 86 | US | Actress | Meet Danny Wilson; The Cry Baby Killer |
| May | 12 | Cornell Borchers | 89 | Lithuania | Actress | The Big Lift; Never Say Goodbye |
| May | 12 | H. R. Giger | 74 | Switzerland | Designer, Illustrator | Alien; Species |
| May | 12 | Ralph Peduto | 72 | US | Actor | Mrs. Doubtfire; Patch Adams |
| May | 13 | Malik Bendjelloul | 36 | Sweden | Documentarian | Searching for Sugar Man |
| May | 18 | Gordon Willis | 82 | US | Cinematographer | The Godfather; Annie Hall |
| May | 20 | Barbara Murray | 84 | UK | Actress | Passport to Pimlico; Operation Bullshine |
| May | 21 | Jane "Poni" Adams | 95 | US | Actress | House of Dracula; Batman and Robin |
| May | 22 | Matthew Cowles | 69 | US | Actor | Slap Shot; The Juror |
| May | 23 | Mona Freeman | 87 | US | Actress | Black Beauty; Jumping Jacks |
| May | 23 | Michael Gottlieb | 69 | US | Director, Screenwriter | Mannequin; Mr. Nanny |
| May | 25 | Lee Chamberlin | 76 | US | Actress | Uptown Saturday Night; Let's Do It Again |
| May | 25 | Herb Jeffries | 100 | US | Actor, Singer | The Bronze Buckaroo; Harlem on the Prairie |
| May | 26 | Anna Berger | 91 | US | Actress | Crimes and Misdemeanors; The Taking of Pelham One Two Three |
| May | 28 | Maya Angelou | 86 | US | Actress | Madea's Family Reunion; Poetic Justice |
| May | 29 | Karlheinz Böhm | 86 | Germany | Actor | The Wonderful World of the Brothers Grimm; Peeping Tom |
| May | 30 | Joan Lorring | 88 | US | Actress | The Corn Is Green; Three Strangers |
| May | 31 | Martha Hyer | 89 | US | Actress | Some Came Running; Sabrina |
| June | 1 | Joseph Olita | 70 | Kenya | Actor | Rise and Fall of Idi Amin; Sheena |
| June | 7 | Jacques Herlin | 86 | France | Actor | Shaft in Africa; The Messenger: The Story of Joan of Arc |
| June | 8 | Veronica Lazăr | 75 | Romania | Actress | Last Tango in Paris; La Luna |
| June | 9 | Rik Mayall | 56 | UK | Actor | An American Werewolf in London; Drop Dead Fred |
| June | 11 | Ruby Dee | 91 | US | Actress | American Gangster; Do the Right Thing |
| June | 11 | Gilles Ségal | 82 | France | Actor | Topkapi; The Madwoman of Chaillot |
| June | 12 | Carla Laemmle | 104 | US | Actress | The Phantom of the Opera; Dracula |
| June | 13 | Pennie DuPont | 75 | US | Casting Director | The Karate Kid; Peggy Sue Got Married |
| June | 14 | Sam Kelly | 70 | UK | Actor | Nanny McPhee and the Big Bang; Topsy-Turvy |
| June | 14 | Francis Matthews | 86 | UK | Actor | Dracula: Prince of Darkness; The Revenge of Frankenstein |
| June | 14 | Terry Richards | 81 | UK | Actor, Stuntman | Raiders of the Lost Ark; Total Recall |
| June | 15 | Jacques Bergerac | 87 | France | Actor | Gigi; Les Girls |
| June | 17 | Anthony Goldschmidt | 71 | US | Title Designer | Young Frankenstein; Batman Forever |
| June | 17 | Barry Moss | 74 | US | Casting Director | Friday the 13th; Blood Simple |
| June | 18 | James Nelson | 81 | US | Sound Engineer | The Exorcist; Beach Party |
| June | 24 | Eli Wallach | 98 | US | Actor | The Good, the Bad and the Ugly; The Magnificent Seven |
| June | 26 | Wolf Koenig | 86 | Canada | Documentarian | Lonely Boy; City of Gold |
| June | 26 | Mary Rodgers | 83 | US | Screenwriter | Freaky Friday; The Devil and Max Devlin |
| June | 27 | Bobby Womack | 70 | US | Actor, Composer | Sgt. Pepper's Lonely Hearts Club Band; Across 110th Street |
| June | 28 | Meshach Taylor | 67 | US | Actor | Mannequin; Damien: Omen II |
| June | 30 | Bob Hastings | 89 | US | Actor | McHale's Navy; The Poseidon Adventure |
| June | 30 | Paul Mazursky | 84 | US | Actor, Director, Screenwriter | An Unmarried Woman; Bob & Carol & Ted & Alice |
| July | 4 | Paul Apted | 47 | UK | Sound Engineer | Alice in Wonderland; The Book Thief |
| July | 5 | Noel Black | 77 | US | Director, Screenwriter | Private School; Mischief |
| July | 5 | Rosemary Murphy | 89 | Germany | Actress | To Kill a Mockingbird; Ben |
| July | 6 | Dave Bickers | 76 | UK | Stuntman | Octopussy; Indiana Jones and the Last Crusade |
| July | 6 | Dave Legeno | 50 | UK | Actor | Harry Potter; Snow White and the Huntsman |
| July | 7 | Dick Jones | 87 | US | Actor, Singer | Pinocchio; Nancy Drew... Reporter |
| July | 9 | Ken Thorne | 90 | UK | Composer | Superman II; Juggernaut |
| July | 10 | Zohra Sehgal | 102 | India | Actress, Dancer | Bend It Like Beckham; The Mistress of Spices |
| July | 14 | Tom Rolf | 82 | Sweden | Film Editor | Taxi Driver; The Right Stuff |
| July | 16 | Hans Funck | 61 | Germany | Film Editor | The Invasion; Diana |
| July | 17 | Elaine Stritch | 89 | US | Actress | September; Out to Sea |
| July | 18 | Dietmar Schönherr | 88 | Austria | Actor | Journey of Hope; Coast of Skeletons |
| July | 19 | John Fasano | 52 | US | Screenwriter, Director | Another 48 Hrs.; Darkness Falls |
| July | 19 | James Garner | 86 | US | Actor | The Great Escape; The Notebook |
| July | 19 | Skye McCole Bartusiak | 21 | US | Actress | The Patriot; Don't Say a Word |
| July | 20 | Álex Angulo | 61 | Spain | Actor | The Day of the Beast; Pan's Labyrinth |
| July | 23 | Dora Bryan | 91 | UK | Actress | Carry On Sergeant; A Taste of Honey |
| July | 24 | Walt Martin | 69 | US | Sound Engineer | American Sniper; Flags of Our Fathers |
| July | 28 | James Shigeta | 85 | US | Actor, Singer | Die Hard; The Crimson Kimono |
| July | 30 | Dennis Lipscomb | 72 | US | Actor | WarGames; Under Siege |
| July | 30 | Dick Smith | 92 | US | Makeup Artist | Amadeus; The Godfather |
| July | 31 | Kenny Ireland | 68 | UK | Actor | Local Hero; The Dogs of War |
| August | 5 | Marilyn Burns | 65 | US | Actress | The Texas Chainsaw Massacre; Eaten Alive |
| August | 8 | Menahem Golan | 85 | Israel | Director, Producer, Screenwriter | The Delta Force; Superman IV: The Quest for Peace |
| August | 8 | Charles Keating | 72 | UK | Actor | The Bodyguard; The Thomas Crown Affair |
| August | 8 | Danny Murphy | 58 | US | Actor | There's Something About Mary; Me, Myself & Irene |
| August | 8 | Peter Sculthorpe | 85 | Australia | Composer | Manganinnie; Age of Consent |
| August | 9 | J. E. Freeman | 68 | US | Actor | Wild at Heart; Miller's Crossing |
| August | 9 | Ed Nelson | 85 | US | Actor | Midway; Soldier in the Rain |
| August | 11 | Joe Viskocil | 61 | US | Visual Effects Artist | Star Wars; Independence Day |
| August | 11 | Robin Williams | 63 | US | Actor, Comedian | Dead Poets Society; Good Will Hunting |
| August | 12 | Lauren Bacall | 89 | US | Actress | To Have and Have Not; The Mirror Has Two Faces |
| August | 13 | Columba Domínguez | 85 | Mexico | Actress | Pueblerina; Maclovia |
| August | 14 | Stephen Lee | 58 | US | Actor | La Bamba; Burlesque |
| August | 18 | Tom Pevsner | 87 | UK | Producer | James Bond; Dracula |
| August | 19 | Brian G. Hutton | 79 | US | Director | Where Eagles Dare; Kelly's Heroes |
| August | 24 | Richard Attenborough | 90 | UK | Actor, Director | Jurassic Park; Gandhi |
| August | 25 | William Greaves | 87 | US | Documentarian | Symbiopsychotaxiplasm; Lost Boundaries |
| August | 28 | Bill Kerr | 92 | Australia | Actor | Gallipoli; The Pirate Movie |
| August | 29 | George L. Little | 63 | US | Costume Designer | The Hurt Locker; Zero Dark Thirty |
| August | 30 | Andrew V. McLaglen | 94 | US | Director | Fools' Parade; McLintock! |
| September | 1 | Gottfried John | 72 | Germany | Actor | GoldenEye; Proof of Life |
| September | 4 | Joan Rivers | 81 | US | Actress, Comedian, Director, Screenwriter | Spaceballs; Rabbit Test |
| September | 5 | Karel Černý | 92 | Czech Republic | Art Director | Amadeus; The Wolves of Willoughby Chase |
| September | 6 | Stefan Gierasch | 88 | US | Actor | Carrie; High Plains Drifter |
| September | 7 | Don Keefer | 98 | US | Actor | Liar Liar; Butch Cassidy and the Sundance Kid |
| September | 7 | Yoshiko Ōtaka | 94 | Japan | Actress, Singer | Japanese War Bride; House of Bamboo |
| September | 9 | Denny Miller | 80 | US | Actor | Tarzan, the Ape Man; The Party |
| September | 10 | Richard Kiel | 74 | US | Actor | The Spy Who Loved Me; Happy Gilmore |
| September | 11 | Joachim Fuchsberger | 87 | Germany | Actor | Mystery Submarine; The Face of Fu Manchu |
| September | 11 | Donald Sinden | 90 | UK | Actor | The Island at the Top of the World; The Cruel Sea |
| September | 12 | Theodore J. Flicker | 84 | US | Director, Screenwriter | The President's Analyst; Spinout |
| September | 14 | Assheton Gorton | 84 | UK | Production Designer | 101 Dalmatians; The French Lieutenant's Woman |
| September | 14 | Angus Lennie | 84 | UK | Actor | The Great Escape; Oh! What a Lovely War |
| September | 19 | Audrey Long | 92 | US | Actress | Tall in the Saddle; Born to Kill |
| September | 20 | Polly Bergen | 84 | US | Actress, Singer | Cape Fear; The Caretakers |
| September | 20 | John J. Lloyd | 92 | US | Production Designer | The Thing; The Blues Brothers |
| September | 20 | George Sluizer | 82 | France | Director, Producer, Screenwriter | The Vanishing; Dark Blood |
| September | 26 | Sam Hall | 93 | US | Screenwriter | House of Dark Shadows; Night of Dark Shadows |
| October | 2 | Carlos Lopez | 25 | US | Stuntman | The Hunger Games: Catching Fire; Olympus Has Fallen |
| October | 4 | Michael Goldberg | 55 | US | Screenwriter | Snow Dogs; Little Giants |
| October | 5 | Geoffrey Holder | 84 | Trinidad | Actor, Singer | Annie; Live and Let Die |
| October | 5 | Ike Jones | 84 | US | Producer, Actor | A Man Called Adam; The River Niger |
| October | 5 | Misty Upham | 32 | US | Actress | Frozen River; August: Osage County |
| October | 5 | Anna Przybylska | 35 | US | Actress | Career of Nikos Dyzma |
| October | 6 | Marian Seldes | 86 | US | Actress | Home Alone 3; August Rush |
| October | 7 | Federico Boido | 75 | Italy | Actor | Super Fly T.N.T.; Apache Woman |
| October | 9 | Jan Hooks | 57 | US | Actress | Batman Returns; Coneheads |
| October | 9 | Kim Koscki | 50 | US | Stuntman | Austin Powers; Buffy the Vampire Slayer |
| October | 10 | Pavel Landovský | 78 | Czech Republic | Actor | Ragtime; The Unbearable Lightness of Being |
| October | 11 | Gary McLarty | 73 | US | Stuntman | The Terminator; Animal House |
| October | 11 | Bob Orrison | 86 | US | Stuntman | Die Hard 2; Stargate |
| October | 14 | Elizabeth Peña | 55 | US | Actress | Jacob's Ladder; Rush Hour |
| October | 15 | Marie Dubois | 77 | France | Actress | Monte Carlo or Bust!; Hot Line |
| October | 19 | Edward Donno | 79 | US | Stuntman | The Fast and the Furious; Beverly Hills Cop |
| October | 19 | Gerard Parkes | 90 | Canada | Actor | The Boondock Saints; It Takes Two |
| October | 20 | Ox Baker | 80 | US | Actor | Escape from New York; The Big Brawl |
| October | 20 | L. M. Kit Carson | 73 | US | Actor, Producer, Screenwriter | The Texas Chainsaw Massacre 2; Paris, Texas |
| October | 24 | Ted Beniades | 91 | US | Actor | Scarface; Serpico |
| October | 24 | Marcia Strassman | 66 | US | Actress | Honey, I Shrunk the Kids; Another Stakeout |
| October | 30 | Renée Asherson | 99 | UK | Actress | The Others; Henry V |
| October | 31 | Ian Fraser | 81 | UK | Composer | Scrooge; Zorro, The Gay Blade |
| November | 1 | Donald Saddler | 94 | US | Choreographer | The Happy Hooker; By the Light of the Silvery Moon |
| November | 4 | Richard Schaal | 86 | US | Actor | Once Bitten; Slaughterhouse-Five |
| November | 6 | Carole Matthews | 94 | US | Actress | Swamp Women; Showdown at Boot Hill |
| November | 10 | Steve Dodd | 86 | Australia | Actor | The Matrix; Gallipoli |
| November | 10 | Ernest Kinoy | 89 | US | Screenwriter | Leadbelly; Buck and the Preacher |
| November | 10 | Ken Takakura | 83 | Japan | Actor | The Yakuza; Black Rain |
| November | 10 | Geula Nuni | 72 | Israel | Actress | Charlie Ve'hetzi; Sallah Shabati |
| November | 11 | Carol Ann Susi | 62 | US | Actress | The Secret of My Success; Death Becomes Her |
| November | 12 | Warren Clarke | 67 | UK | Actor | A Clockwork Orange; Top Secret! |
| November | 12 | Richard Pasco | 88 | UK | Actor | Yesterday's Enemy; Rasputin the Mad Monk |
| November | 19 | Mike Nichols | 83 | US | Director, Producer, Screenwriter | The Graduate; Who's Afraid of Virginia Woolf? |
| November | 22 | Derek Deadman | 74 | UK | Actor | Time Bandits; Brazil |
| November | 25 | Joanna Dunham | 78 | UK | Actress | The Greatest Story Ever Told; Scandal |
| November | 27 | Frank Yablans | 79 | US | Executive, Producer, Screenwriter | Mommie Dearest; North Dallas Forty |
| November | 28 | Danny Lee | 95 | US | Special Effects Artist | Bonnie and Clyde; Bedknobs and Broomsticks |
| December | 2 | Gerry Fisher | 88 | UK | Cinematographer | The Exorcist III; Aces High |
| December | 2 | Jeff Truman | 57 | Australia | Actor | Superman Returns; The Quiet American |
| December | 5 | Manuel De Sica | 65 | Italy | Composer | A Place for Lovers; Al lupo al lupo |
| December | 6 | Takao Saito | 85 | Japan | Cinematographer | Ran; Kagemusha |
| December | 7 | Eddie Rouse | 60 | US | Actor | American Gangster; Pineapple Express |
| December | 9 | Mary Ann Mobley | 75 | US | Actress | Girl Happy; Harum Scarum |
| December | 11 | Tom Adams | 76 | UK | Actor | The Great Escape; Licensed to Kill |
| December | 15 | Booth Colman | 91 | US | Actor | World Without End; Intolerable Cruelty |
| December | 18 | Virna Lisi | 78 | Italy | Actress | How to Murder Your Wife; La Reine Margot |
| December | 19 | Arthur Gardner | 104 | US | Producer | McQ; Brannigan |
| December | 21 | Stuart A. Reiss | 93 | US | Set Decorator | Fantastic Voyage; The Diary of Anne Frank |
| December | 21 | Billie Whitelaw | 82 | UK | Actress | The Omen; Hot Fuzz |
| December | 22 | Christine Cavanaugh | 51 | US | Voice Actress | Babe; The Rugrats Movie |
| December | 22 | Richard Graydon | 92 | UK | Stuntman | James Bond; Batman |
| December | 22 | Joseph Sargent | 89 | US | Director | The Taking of Pelham One Two Three; Jaws: The Revenge |
| December | 23 | Mike Elliott | 68 | UK | Actor | Billy Elliot; Goal! |
| December | 23 | Jeremy Lloyd | 84 | UK | Actor, Screenwriter | Are You Being Served?; Murder on the Orient Express |
| December | 25 | Dave Comer | 59 | New Zealand | Location Scout | The Lord of the Rings; The Hobbit |
| December | 25 | Bernard Kay | 86 | UK | Actor | Doctor Zhivago; Darling Lili |
| December | 25 | David Ryall | 79 | UK | Actor | Quartet; Around the World in 80 Days |
| December | 26 | Rhodes Reason | 84 | US | Actor | King Kong Escapes; A Fever in the Blood |
| December | 30 | Yolande Donlan | 94 | UK | Actress | Jigsaw; 80,000 Suspects |
| December | 30 | Patrick Gowers | 78 | UK | Composer | Hamlet; The Virgin and the Gypsy |
| December | 30 | Luise Rainer | 104 | Germany | Actress | The Great Ziegfeld; The Good Earth |
| December | 31 | Edward Herrmann | 71 | US | Actor | The Lost Boys; Annie |

== Film debuts ==
- Melissa Barrera – L for Leisure
- Danielle Brooks – Time Out of Mind
- Nicole Byer – A Better You
- Timothée Chalamet – Men, Women & Children
- Dean-Charles Chapman – Before I Go to Sleep
- Hong Chau – Inherent Vice
- Olivia Cooke – The Signal
- Carrie Coon – Gone Girl
- Hermione Corfield – 50 Kisses
- Lilla Crawford – Into the Woods
- Pete Davidson – School Dance
- Lily-Rose Depp – Tusk
- Taron Egerton – Testament of Youth
- Shira Haas – Princess
- Shelley Hennig – Ouija
- Anders Holm – Neighbors
- Zeno Koo – Enthralled
- Jake Lacy – Obvious Child
- Jaeden Martell – St. Vincent
- Ignacyo Matynia – The Grievance Group
- Janelle Monáe – Rio 2
- Artemis Pebdani – Sex Tape
- Larry Poole – Valley Inn
- Florence Pugh – The Falling
- Salva Reina – 321 Days in Michigan
- Kriti Sanon – 1: Nenokkadine
- Bianca Santos – Ouija
- Simona Tabasco – Perez.
- Karidja Touré – Girlhood
- Lulu Wilson – Deliver Us from Evil
