= Shipwrecked: Battle of the Islands 2006 =

- Season 1
- Presented by: Craig Kelly (narrator)
- No. of days: 140
- No. of castaways: 30
- Winner: Sharks
- Location: Moturakau and Rapota, Cook Islands, South Pacific
- No. of episodes: 20

Release
- Original network: Channel 4
- Original release: 8 January – 28 May 2006

Additional information
- Filming dates: September 2005 – January 2006

Season chronology
- ← Previous; Shipwrecked Next → Battle of the Islands 2007

Shipwrecked: Battle of the Islands 2006 is a British reality series that premiered on Channel 4 in 2006. It is the fourth series of the RDF Media programme, Shipwrecked, and featured a radically different format from the first three series, in that contestants were divided into tribes, with competitions, voting and a cash prize at stake.

== Tribes ==
Sharks			Tigers		
Member	Arrival Week	Original Tribe	Original Tribe	Arrival Week	Member
Laura Pratt; 21, Kent	1	Sharks	Tigers	1	Charlie Freeman; 18, Darlington
Niff Faulks; 23, Cornwall	1	Sharks	Tigers	1	Katie Rose; 18, Hampshire
Lou Gazeley; 19, Croydon	1	Sharks	Tigers	1	Chris Brain; 23, Isle of Man
Sam Bush; 19, Bournemouth	5	Sharks	Tigers	1	Crawford Anderson; 23, London
James George^{1} 22, Wiltshire	6	Tigers	Tigers	2	Alara Gee; 23, Leeds
Ishta Nyakoojo; 22, Manchester	8	Sharks	Tigers	4	Charlie Murray; 20, Winchester
James Mudie; 20, West Sussex	9	Sharks	Tigers	7	Lucy Roberts-Bakkioui; 20, London
Jo Armstrong^{2} 23, Warrington	10	Sharks	Tigers	7	Richard Biedul; 22, London
Annalisa Addison; 21, London	14	Sharks	Tigers	11	Leah Hibbert; 21, London
Gareth Saunders^{5} 22, Plymouth	13	Tigers	Tigers	1	Chris Baddoo^{3} 18, Newcastle upon Tyne
Courtney Hayles^{6} 23, London/Manchester	12	Tigers	Tigers	15	Rory Nugent; 23, Dublin
Anna Singleton; 23, London	15	Sharks	Sharks	1	John Melvin^{7} 22, London/Northern Ireland
Kevin Bratherton^{4} 23, Manchester	3	Sharks	Tigers	16	Ryan Lewis; 19, Cardiff
Zara Brocklesby; 22, London	17	Sharks	Tigers	18	Jonathan Ross; 23, London
Jenni Danns; 22, Liverpool	19	Sharks			

^Note 1: James George originally joined Tigers in Week 6, but nominated to Sharks in Week 8 after being found out as a Shark mole by the Tigers.
^Note 2: Jo Armstrong is the sister of departed castaway Geoff Armstrong. Jo originally introduced herself as "Lorna" in her week as new arrival to hide her relationship to Geoff.
^Note 3: Chris Baddoo made a shock nomination to Sharks in Week 11, but nominated back to Tigers in Week 13 using up his two island moves.
^Note 4: Kevin had nominated to Tigers in Week 13, but was rejected as the Tigers favoured the returning Chris Baddoo. Kevin successfully nominated to Tigers in Week 14. As a punishment for the kidnapping of Anna Singleton in Week 16, the Tigers nominated Kevin to go back to the Sharks as a "punishment", Kevin had always planned on nominating back to the Sharks anyway.
^Note 5: Gareth nominated to Sharks after an unhappy week on Tigers in Week 14.
^Note 6: Courtney nominated to Sharks in Week 15, after not settling on Tiger Island.
^Note 7: John volunteered to serve the Shark's punishment for setting foot on Tiger Island during the Anna Singleton fiasco.

=== Castaways that departed ===
Sharks
Name	Arrival Week	Week Departed	Reason for Leaving
Geoff Armstrong; 21, Warrington	1	5	Rejected move from Tigers.

== The Kidnapping of Anna Singleton ==
During the sixteenth week in the competition, both tribes were asked to select a member of the opposing side to stay for one night, in a game where numbers are vital this was an ideal opportunity to claim back former members who had switched. The Shark Tribe ask for Katie who is a founding member of the Tigers and is heavily inclined towards them. When the Tigers ask for Anna the Sharks are wary of their strategy and eagerly await the return of their tribe member.

After a night of enjoyment on Tigers Anna becomes close to Chris Brain, the Tigers agree to kidnap Anna for a bit of fun and send a ransom note to the Sharks. (though when they originally voice the idea you can hear Anna agree to it due.) Enraged by the demands, the Sharks endure the 1/2-mile swim and demand the return of their tribe mate who is hiding in the jungle with Chris Brain, Shipwrecked rules dictate that an opposing tribe cannot stand on the opposing island unless invited or if it is a Sunday (generally known as a Beach Party where the new castaway decide their tribe). The Sharks violate this rule by raiding the camp and in doing so taking Kevin with them, thus breaking another rule by unofficially joining an island without nomination. At the Beach Party in which Ryan chose his tribe (eventually, Tigers) they were informed that they would be punished for their actions, and that each tribe must sacrifice one of their own to move permanently. Tiger Island accepted Kevin's wish to return, meanwhile Shark Island's John Melvin volunteered to move.

When Kevin and John swapped necklaces – they were reminded that this was non-negotiable. And they would never bear their old tribes necklace, much to the dismay of Sharks.
