= Girls Up =

Single by Belle Amie
- Released: 28 August 2011
- Recorded: 2011
- Genre: Electropop
- Length: 3:14
- Label: Dodient Records
- Songwriters: Michaela Shiloh, Chad Dexter
- Producer: Chad Dexter

Belle Amie singles chronology
"Girls Up" (2011)	"Shine" (2012)

Music video
- "Girls Up" on YouTube

"Girls Up" is the debut single by British girl group Belle Amie. It was released to iTunes on 28 August 2011. The song was produced and written by Chad Dexter and Michaela Shiloh .

== Chart performance ==
The single charted at #25 on the UK Indie Singles Chart, but moved down to #39 the next week. The single failed to chart in Ireland and Scotland, or on the overall UK Top 200.

== Music video ==
The music video for "Girls Up" was directed by D. O. Fissoun and Mouktar Mohammed and premiered on 17 June 2011 via their official YouTube account. The video sees the girls portrays as dolls, reflecting on modern pressures of girls, and how pretty they feel they must look to impress people. As of June 2012 the video has been viewed 1,024,144 times on YouTube.

== Live performance ==
On 2 July 2011, they performed it at London Pride. On 19 August 2011, they performed the single live on Lorraine.

== Track listing ==
- Digital remix EP
1. "Girls Up" – 3:58
2. "Girls Up" (JME Grime Mix feat. JME) – 3:57
3. "Girls Up" (DJ Q Remix feat. JME) – 5:23
4. "Girls Up" (Skillzbeatz Urban Mix) – 4:16
5. "Girls Up" (The Squatters Remix) – 6:19
6. "Girls Up" (Crysta Healy Remix) – 3:34
7. "Girls Up" (Money Anderson Soulful House Mix) – 6:13

== Chart ==
Chart (2011)	Peak position
UK Indie (OCC)	25

== Release history ==
Region	Date	Format	Label
Ireland	28 August 2011	Digital download	Dodient Records
United Kingdom	28 August 2011	Digital download	Dodient Records
