= Shipwrecked: Battle of the Islands 2007 =

- Season 2
- Presented by: Craig Kelly (narrator)
- No. of days: 140 (Day 140 as of 3 June 2007)
- No. of castaways: 29
- Winner: Tigers
- Location: Moturakau and Rapota, Cook Islands, South Pacific
- No. of episodes: 20

Release
- Original network: Channel 4
- Original release: 21 January – 10 June 2007

Additional information
- Filming dates: September 2006 – January 2007

Season chronology
- ← Previous; Battle of the Islands 2006 Next → Battle of the Islands 2008

Shipwrecked: Battle of the Islands 2007 is a UK reality television series which aired on Channel 4's youth programming label T4. The fifth series of Shipwrecked was aired in 2007 and used the "Battle of the Islands" format, which was first seen in the previous year.

== The game ==
The basic premise of Shipwrecked works in a Survivor style situation in which a group of strangers are placed in the Cook Islands. However instead of voting off members of their island they must persuade new arrivals to the game to join their island in an attempt to outnumber their rivals and win a share of £70,000. There are two competing tribes, the Sharks and Tigers which start out with five castaways on each island, and at the end of each weekly beach party in which all the castaways meet a new person joins and spends three days with each island before making their decision and choosing which tribe to join making each episode a seven-day cycle.

There are also numerous ways to make your tribe bigger without initially winning new arrivals. If a member of a tribe wishes to defect to the rival team they must announce at the beach party then state a case to the island he/she wishes to join. Unless there is a unanimous decision the person requesting to move must remain on their island for another week.

Punishments are harsh and severe in Shipwrecked, such as a permanent banishment to the rival island and being told to stay on your respective island during the beach party which could mean a big loss for that particular island wishing to obtain the new arrival. If a team is larger in number the producers may decide to shipwreck two castaways who must join the same team in order for the tribe with the lower number to stand a chance in the final week.

The 2007 series is notable for having three new twists into the competition, starting with a men vs. women divide, then in the final weeks a No Man's Land in which two new arrivals lived on that island for six days and two previous castaways from Shipwrecked: Battle of the Islands joined the current islanders to decide the winners of the competition. The two previous castaways agreed to join the Tigers in a joint decision, meaning Tiger Island won overall with 15 tribe members to the Sharks' 14.

== Island nominations ==
At the conclusion of the weekly beach party the castaways can nominate themselves to swap to the opposing island. The tribe they request to join must make a unanimous decision as to whether or to accept or deny their nomination. Each castaway is permitted two moves during their stay.

Week	Nominee	Request to join	Result
3	Lucy	Sharks	Accepted
6	Lucy	Tigers	Accepted
8	Amy	Sharks	Accepted
10	Sophia	Sharks	Accepted
10	Allen	Sharks	Denied
12	Will	Sharks	Accepted
13	Jane	Tigers	Accepted

== Punishments ==
If one (or more) castaways disobey the rules of the game at any point, a punishment is given on the immediately following the weekly beach party.

Week	Castaway	Reason	Outcome
1	Lucy	Trespassing on Shark Island.	Barred from attending the following weeks Beach Party.
1	Lianne	Trespassing on Shark Island.	Barred from attending the following weeks Beach Party.
7	Lucy	Trespassing on Shark Island to steal.	The Sharks kidnapped Terri for one week.
7	Terri	Trespassing on Shark Island to steal.	The Sharks kidnapped Terri for one week.
9	Stevie	Trespassing on Tiger Island to invite Ben, Fiona and Terri to a birthday party.	Will and Terri moved to their opposing island for three weeks.
9	Will	Trespassing on Tiger Island to invite Ben, Fiona and Terri to a birthday party.	Will and Terri moved to their opposing island for three weeks.

== Tribes ==
As the tribes entered their final week on the islands, the Sharks led 14 castaways to the Tigers' 13. Two former castaways (John and Charlie) from the 2006 series joined the current castaways to choose their favourite island and hence decide the winners of Shipwrecked 2007. They both decided that the Tigers be crowned winners of the competition. Although Amy, Terri and Sophia nominated over to the Sharks it was concluded that the Tigers had won more new arrivals, 11 in total, compared to 8 for the Sharks.

Joe Stone was revealed as the winner of the "Shipwrecker of the Year" award during the T4 studio reunion show on 10 June. The other finalists included: Paul Harris, James Green, Lianne Dauban, Jane Barrie and Lucy Buchanan.

Sharks			Tigers		
Member	Arrival week	Original tribe	Original tribe	Arrival week	Member
Stevie Thomas; 21, London	1	Sharks	Tigers	1	Fiona Merry; 21, Brighton
Joe Stone; 19, Kidderminster	1	Sharks	Tigers	1	Lianne Dauban; 19, Bristol
Stuart Mann; 23, Stevenage	1	Sharks	Tigers	4	Ben Cochrane; 23, Edinburgh
Will Colin^{3} 24, Kent	1	Sharks	Tigers	6	Ben Lunt; 23, Liverpool
Paul Harris; 23, Dorset	2	Sharks	Tigers	1	Lucy Buchanan^{1} 18, Edinburgh
Jo Davis; 24, London	5	Sharks	Tigers	8	James Green; 22, Brentwood
Naomi Millbank-Smith; 21, Essex	7	Sharks	Tigers	12	Louis Rennocks; 19, Loughborough
Amy Blackburn; 23, Brighton	3	Tigers	Tigers	13	Ben Chesney; 22, Essex
Terri Jones^{2} 23, London	1	Tigers	Sharks	12	Jane Barrie ^{4} 26, Surrey
Elisa McNally; 24, Suffolk	10	Sharks	Tigers	14	Francesca Willi; 20, Surrey
Sophia Wardman; 19, Scarborough	1	Tigers	Tigers	17	Fliss Jaine; 23, Shropshire
Ella Bowman; 18, Oxford	11	Sharks	Tigers	18	James Goldthorpe; 23, Rutland
Kim Davidson; 22, Salisbury	15	Sharks	Tigers	18	Lucy Carr; 25, London
Jonno Burden; 20, Edinburgh	16	Sharks	Tigers	19	John Melvin ^{5} 23, London; Battle of the Islands 2006
			Tigers	19	Charlie Freeman ^{5} 19, Darlington; Battle of the Islands 2006

^Note 1: Lucy can no longer move tribes.
^Note 2: Terri was temporarily a member of Sharks for rule breaking in Week 7. She again went to Sharks for rule breaking a second time in Week 9.
^Note 3: Will was temporarily a member of the Tigers for rule breaking in Week 9.
^Note 4: Jane was a prize in the pontoon race in Week 12.
^Note 5: John Melvin and Charlie Freeman were previous castaways from Shipwrecked: Battle of the Islands 2006.

Contestant Terri Jones died of heart failure in May 2014, three months after the death of 2009 contestant Nadejah Williams.

=== Castaways who departed ===
Sharks
Name	Arrival week	Week departed	Reason for leaving
Lorenzo Preecha; 21, London	1	10	Homesick

Tigers
Name	Arrival week	Week departed	Reason for leaving
Allen Brandie; 20, Aberdeen	9	11	Failed to adapt to island life

== Controversy ==
To date, three contestants have been in the national press for acts of racism, theft and being accused of putting castaways under a bad light on purpose for the sake of ratings.

On the season premiere, contestant Lucy Buchanan got bad press when she stated that she backs slavery, claiming black people are "really bad" and saying she was open to many cultures but should not bring them to Britain. Ofcom received numerous complaints. This came just after Celebrity Big Brother contestants Jade Goody, Jo O'Meara and Danielle Lloyd were accused of racism towards Bollywood star Shilpa Shetty.

Shark Island contestant Lorenzo Preecha defended Lucy from claims that she was a racist saying she was "a pawn in their game" and "she is being used by the producers". Days later, it was revealed that Lorenzo decided to quit the contest after three weeks, but he actually left on Day 70.

Week 12 contestant Louis Rennocks was charged with theft of alcohol from a local Sainsbury's and may be fined his winnings if the tribe he joins (the Tigers) wins. He was later arrested at Heathrow Airport on 26 January 2007.
