= List of Iraqi films of 2014 =

The Iraqi film industry produced over five feature films in 2014. This article fully lists all non-pornographic films, including short films, that had a release date in that year and which were at least partly made by Iraq. It does not include films first released in previous years that had release dates in 2014.
Also included is an overview of the major events in Iraqi film, including film festivals and awards ceremonies, as well as lists of those films that have been particularly well received, both critically and financially.

== Major releases ==
Opening		Title	Cast and Crew	Studio	Genre(s)	Ref.
J U L Y	6	Memories on Stone	Director: Shawkat Amin Korki; Cast: Hussein Hassan		Drama	
S E P T E M B E R	6	Iraqi Odyssey	Director: Samir		Documentary	
S E P T E M B E R	6	Mardan	Director: Batin Ghobadi; Cast: Helan Abdulla		Drama	

== Minor releases ==
Title	Director	Release date	Genre
A Nation Without a Homeland	Warith Kwaish		Documentary
A serious comedy	Lander Camarero	September 2014 (Spain)	Documentary
Da Sean Caddy Show Documentary	S. Andrew Linzy		Documentary
Êk Momik, Du Momik...	Jano Rosebiani	21 February 2014 (USA)	Comedy
Gishru	Sargon Saadi		Documentary
HALABJA. VIDA DESPUES DE LA MUERTE	Julián Flordelís		Documentary
Marshland Dreams	John Antonelli		Documentary
Peace on the Tigris	Takeharu Watai	14 December 2014 (United Arab Emirates)	Documentary
Shahé	Shein Mezour		Documentary
Silence of the Shepherd	Raad Mushatat	October 2014 (United Arab Emirates)	Drama
Syria's Lost Generation	Julie Winokur		Documentary
The Dance of the horses	Sardar Khalil		Drama
The Face of the Ash	Shakhwan Idrees	3 October 2014 (South Korea)	Drama
The Last Plight	Sargon Saadi		Documentary
There and Back	Travis Barnes		Documentary
Two countries, one exile	Justin de Gonzague		Documentary
Water Bodouins	Yavuz Pullukcu	November 2014 (USA)	Documentary

== See also ==
- 2014 in film
- 2014 in Iraq
- Cinema of Iraq
- List of Iraqi submissions for the Academy Award for Best Foreign Language Film
