= Wardman =

Wardman is a surname. Notable people with the surname include:

- Chris Wardman, Canadian music producer, musician and songwriter
- Harry Wardman (1872–1938), American real estate developer
- Sophia Wardman, musician
