= Tastemaker Music =

Record production company

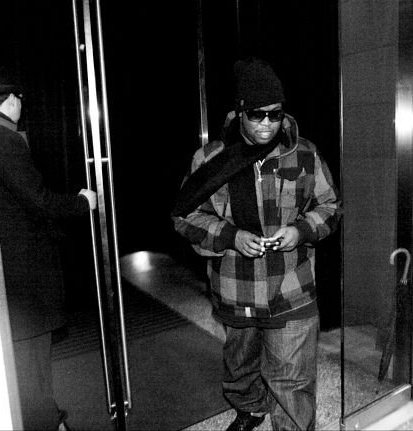

Background information
- Born: December 7, 1983 (age 42)
- Origin: Boston, Massachusetts, United States
- Genres: Alternative hip hop, R&B, electro, pop rock, power pop
- Occupations: Record producer, songwriter, rapper, musician,
- Years active: 2004–present
- Members: Nex Phaze (producer), Steve Morgan (producer)

Tastemaker Music LLC (a.k.a. The Tastemakers) is a record production company, owned and operated by songwriter & multi-platinum selling record producer, Chad Dexter, primarily known as Chad Beatz.

== Background ==
Chad Dexter was born Chad Dexter Burnette on December 7, 1983. At age 17, during his high school years, Chad Dexter was introduced to and then soon after mentored by the artist/producer Ryan Leslie for a few years under Leslie's NextSelection imprint where he honed half of his songwriting and vocal/record production skills. Burnette, along with his father, used to also DJ local parties in the Boston metropolitan area; Burnette constantly wrote and produced full records from his bedroom/basement studio, where he learned and acquired most of his production and musical skills. In October 2003, at age 20, he was discovered by Derick Prosper and the [then] VP of G-Unit, Sha Money XL during his junior year in college, where he was soon awarded the moniker, Chad Beatz due to his infectious and hard-hitting sound. As a part of the deal, Beatz began doing in-house production for 50 Cent, Young Buck, Lloyd Banks and more.

Chad graduated with a Baccalaureate degree in communications in Jan. 2005 from Mount Ida College in Newton, Massachusetts.

After a striving stint with G Unit Records, Beatz founded and formed the production company/imprint TasteMaker Music and started producing records under the label name.

Beatz has produced records, singles, demos and remixes for Jim Jones, Ashanti, Robin Thicke, Twista, Talib Kweli, Mobb Deep, Olivia, Cassie Ventura, Tiffany Evans, Teddy Riley, Fergie, Dawn Angeliqué Richard, and is currently producing for and collaborating with Travis McCoy of Gym Class Heroes, Colin Munroe, Priscilla Renea, Noreaga, Nelly, Lupe Fiasco, Tila Tequila, and Hannah Montana star, Shanica Knowles plus many more.

Chad Beatz (Chad Dexter) co-wrote and produced the hit single "Girls Up" for The X Factor (UK) super-group Belle Amie and also produced on the Cee-Lo Green and Goodie Mobb album We Sell Drugs Too with Nex Phaze.

Chad Beatz (Chad Dexter) was formerly part of the now defunct collaborative production group known as AudioDope that worked with rap artist Kal Duzay and Harlem rap collective Cheers Club – Vinny Chase and Kid Art.

== Production and songwriting ==
- Jesse Boykins III "I Need You", "Like Minded ft.Luke James, "Only Way Out" | Bartholomew Dec 8th, 2017
- Jesse Boykins III "Create Beauty" | Love Apparatus April 22, 2014 ( Co Produced by MachineDrum)
- Rico Love "They Dont Know" (Remix) | Oct 2013
- Vinny Chase | "Golden Army" Mixtape November 29, 2012 (mixing)
- 50 Cent 2011
  - Real Steel Soundtrack "Enforcer" (Co Produced by Chad Beatz | Produced by The Cataracs) *not credited*
- Belle Amie 2011 Album TBA
  - "Girls Up" (Single) (Co-Wrote and Produced | Co-wrote by Michaela Shiloh)
- Travie McCoy Lazarus June 8, 2010
  - "Dont Pretend" ft Colin Munroe
- NORE Part ll – Born Again 2010
  - "Club Is A Zoo" (Co-wrote and Produced)
- Twista Category F5 2009
  - "Jumpoff" (Co-Wrote & Produced)
  - "One Lucky Girl" (unreleased)
    - The album debuted at No. 8 on the Billboard 200, selling 45,000 copies.At its second week of release, the album dropped down to No. 19, selling 19,000 copies. The album has sold 147,220 copies as of December 12, 2009.
- Jim Jones Harlem's American Gangster & Byrdgang M.O.B. Album 2008
  - "Byrdgang Money"

Chart (2008)	Peak position
U.S. Billboard 200	19
U.S. Billboard Top R&B/Hip-Hop Albums	3
U.S. Billboard Top Rap Albums	1
U.S. Billboard Top Independent Albums	1

- Ashanti – The Declaration 2008
  - "Things You Make Me Do" ft Robin Thicke(Background Vocals, Co-Wrote and Co-Produced)
    - The album debuted at No. 6 on the Billboard charts, selling 86,000 units in its first week.

Chart	Providers	Peak position
U.S. Billboard 200	Billboard	6
U.S. Top R&B/Hip-Hop Albums	Billboard	2

- Talib Kweli Eardrum (iTunes) 2007
  - "Hush" ft. Jean Grae
    - Eardrum debuted at number 2 on the U.S. Billboard 200, selling about 60,000 copies in its first week, making it Kweli's highest debuting album to date. On its second week it fell to No. 20 with sales of 25,000 copies, selling a total of 85,500 units.

Chart positions
Year	Album	Chart positions	
Year	Album	Billboard 200	Top R&B/Hip Hop Albums
2007	Eardrum	2	1

- Mobb Deep Blood Money (Mobb Deep album)
  - "DayDreamin"
    - 875,000 copies sold in the U.S. Now Platinum
- Lloyd Banks
  - "If You So Gangsta" Hunger For More (6× Platinum)
    - It was released in 2004 and debuted at number 1 on the Billboard 200 charts with 433,000 copies sold in the first week. Banks for the feeling of having the number 1 album in America, with over 450,000 units sold in the first week of The Hunger For More. "That's the kind of debut that veteran artists have," says Banks. "That showed me that following 50's moves and studying the way that he played the game had put me in an incredible position." The album has since sold over 6 million copies worldwide and has been certified platinum by the RIAA.

Charts
Chart (2004)	Peak position
Dutch Albums Chart	83
French Albums Chart	37
German Albums Chart	45
Irish Albums Chart	36
Swiss Albums Chart	65
UK Albums Chart	15
Canadian Albums Chart	2
U.S. Billboard 200	1
U.S. Billboard Top R&B/Hip-Hop Albums	1

  - "Life" ft. Spider Loc Rotten Apple UK

Charts
Chart (2006)	Peak position
French Albums Chart	65
Irish Albums Chart	27
Swiss Albums Chart	36
UK Albums Chart	40
Canadian Albums Chart	6
U.S. Billboard 200	3
U.S. Billboard Top R&B/Hip-Hop Albums	1

- Young Buck
  - "Do It Like Me" Straight Outta Cashville (3× Platinum)
    - The album debuted at number three on the Billboard 200 with about 261,000 copies sold, in the first week, and has since been certified platinum by the RIAA.
  - "This Is How We Roll" (unreleased)
  - "Project Niggaz" (mixtape)
- Olivia Behind Closed Doors (album shelved)
  - "In My Bed" ft 50 Cent

== Remixes and leaks ==
- Michaela Shiloh 2008
  - Bitch I'm Special (produced and co-wrote)
- Beyoncé 2008
  - "Greenlight "
- Michelle Williams 2008
  - "We Break The Dawn"

== Video games ==
- 50 Cent: Bulletproof Soundtrack
  - "I Run Ny"
  - "I Warned You"
  - All thematic, intro and outro music
