= Michaela Shiloh =

American singer-songwriter

Mickey Shiloh
- Born: January 25, 1992 (age 34)
- Origin: San Mateo, California, U.S.
- Genres: Pop, hip-hop, R&B, urban
- Occupations: Singer-songwriter, entrepreneur
- Years active: 2007–present
- Labels: Darkchild; BDRM
- Website: mickeyshiloh.com

Michaela "Mickey" Shiloh (born January 25, 1992) is an American songwriter and singer. She was signed to Rodney Jerkins' Darkchild Records from 2009 to 2011, during and after which she co-wrote songs for Janet Jackson, Pitbull, Britney Spears, Cassie Ventura, Travis Garland, Jake Miller and Christina Milian.

== Artistry & Entrepreneurship ==
Since 2011, Mickey has released over 40 albums independently. One of her most popular songs, "Drunk On The Mic" was popularized by social media star Kylie Jenner in January 2016. She is the CEO and founder of artist development platform HRDRV.

=== Albums ===
- Dear Future (2011)
- In The Garden Of My Mind (2012)
- Chill Out (2013)
- 20fifteen (2015)
- Summer Wasted (2017)
- SadSongs (2017)
- Fears. (2017)
- Psych Ward Moves (2017)
- RNDM 1 – 666 (6 part EP series)
- Organix (2017)
- 2 Weeks Notice (2018)
- Been Awhile (2018)
- No Titles (2019)
- WARP (2019)
- Horror Stories (2019)
- VOSE ST. (2019)
- 20nineteen (2019)
- 20thirteen (2019)
- 11:11 (2020)
- 20seventeen (2020)
- Amnesia (2020)
- 1992 (2020)
- Enjoy The Heartache Part I (2020)
- Cash Over Love Part I (2020)
- I Don't Miss U (2020)
- Self Care (2020)
- Used To (2020)
- Before The World Ends Part I (2020)
- Before The World Ends Part II (2020)
- AQUA (2021)
- Cash Over Love Part I (2021)
- Enjoy The Heartache Part I (2021)
- It Was Never Love (2021)
- SIMP (2021)
- YOUNG MICK (2021)
- Fluid (2021)
- It Was Fun While It Lasted (2022)

=== Guest appearances ===
- "Jump Off" by Twista (produced by Chad Beatz of Tastemaker Music) (2009)
- "Yesterday" by Traxamillion (produced by Traxamillion) (2010)
- "Touch Yourself" by Kevin McCall (2011)
- "Save the World (On the Dance Floor)" by Sonny Fredie Pedersen (2011)
- "Between the Sheetz" by LL Cool J (produced by Soundz & Tricky Stewart) (2013)
- "Burn Slow" by King Los Feat. Wiz Khalifa (produced by Rob Holladay) (2013)
- "Postcards" by King Los (produced by JO A) (2013)
- "Windows" by Big Von Feat. Keak Da Sneak and The Jacka (produced by Traxamillion) (2013)
- "Reasons" by Abstract (produced by Drumma Battalion) (2016)
- "Y&I" by Sinplus (2017)
- "My Wings" by A Day in Venice (composed and produced by Andrej Kralj) (2017)
- "Getaway" by Keys N Krates
- "Repeat" by Panda Eyes (2021)
- "Negative Thoughts" by Panda Eyes

== Selected songwriting discography ==
=== 2008 ===
- "Instant Gratification" by Tracy Williams (produced by Chad Beatz of Tastemaker Music)
- "Diva" by Tracy Williams (produced by Chad Beatz of Tastemaker Music)

=== 2009 ===
- "Jump Off" by Twista (produced by Chad Beatz of Tastemaker Music)
- Make Me by Janet Jackson (produced by Rodney "Darkchild" Jerkins)

=== 2010 ===
- "Take Ova ft. Pitbull" by Shontelle (produced by Tommy Brown, Rodney "Darkchild" Jerkins)
- "Evacuate My Heart" by Shontelle (produced by Rodney "Darkchild" Jerkins)

=== 2011 ===
- "Don't Keep Me Waiting" by Britney Spears (produced by Rodney "Darkchild" Jerkins)
- "Mr. Worldwide" by Pitbull (rapper)
- "Girls Up" by Belle Amie
- "Girls Talkin Bout" by Mindless Behavior (produced by Ronald "Jukebox" Jackson)
- "Just A Friend" by Jasmine Villegas (produced by Tommy Brown)
- "Masquerade" by Jasmine Villegas (produced by Tommy Brown)
- "Glow in the Dark" by Carishma Bela

=== 2012 ===
- Songs for Nickelodeon film & musical, Rags (film) (starring Keke Palmer, Drake Bell, produced by Nick Cannon)
- "Down South" by Iggy Azalea (produced by Diplo & FKi)
- "1–800 Bone" by Iggy Azalea (produced by Diplo & FKi)
- Vocals on "Boing Clash Boom" by Dada Life (written by Jon Asher, Corneér, Engblom, Hård)

=== 2013 ===
- "RockAByeBaby" by Cassie Ventura (produced by Rob Holladay & The Magnificent)
- "Turn Up" by Cassie Ventura (produced by Yung Berg & Young Chop)
- "Between The Sheetz" by LL Cool J Feat. Mickey Shiloh (produced by Soundz & Tricky Stewart)
- "Burn Slow" by King Los Feat. Wiz Khalifa & Mickey Shiloh (produced by Rob Holladay)
- "Postcards" by King Los Feat. Mickey Shiloh (produced by JO A)
- Vocals on "Boing Clash Boom" by Dada Life (Major Lazer Remix)

=== 2014 ===
- "Risk It All" by Helly Luv (produced by G2)
- "Do It Again" by Eleve (produced by Tommy Brown)
- "Dancing with My Girls" by Katlynn Simone (produced by Yonni)

=== 2015 ===
- "I Still Think Of You" by Serayah McNeill (produced by Amir Swain & Trey Banks)
- "Revolution" by Helly Luv (produced by G2)
- "Whatever U Want" by Sade Serena (produced by Andrea Carax)
- "Night" by Janet Jackson (produced by Jimmy Jam, Terry Lewis, Thomas Lumpkins)

=== 2016 ===
- Shades of Blue by Vic Mensa

=== 2017 ===
- "Love You Right" by Averdeck
- "Back to the Start" by Jake Miller (singer)
- "Stay Up" by Anilyst

=== 2018 ===
- "Metaphysical" by Vic Mensa
- Miss World 2018 | Dances of The World

=== 2019 ===
- "We Need To Talk" by Tayla Parx
- Soundtrack for Sherwood (TV Series)
- "Teach Me" by Cassie Ventura

== Forbes 30 Under 30 ==
In November 2018, Shiloh was listed on Forbes 30 Under 30 in Music for the class of 2019, alongside artists like Camila Cabello and Post Malone. In 2020, Shiloh judged Forbes 30 Under 30 in Music (Class of 2020) alongside The Chainsmokers, 21 Savage and Adriana Arce.
