= Rob Kelly (rapper) =

Irish rapper, record producer and MC (born 1978)

- Born: Robert Kelly; 1978 (age 47–48)
- Origin: Wexford, Ireland
- Genre: Hip hop
- Occupations: MC, rapper, record producer
- Years active: 2003–present
- Labels: Commonwealth Records Soulspazm Records, Acquisition Records

Rob Kelly (born 1978, Wexford, Ireland) is an Irish rapper, record producer and MC.

== Career ==
Kelly became interested in Hip Hop in the late 1980s and early 1990s through a BBC 2 show called Dance Energy that was presented by Normski and was soon an avid collector of albums and magazines like The Source and Hip-Hop Connection Several of Rob's friends and relatives excelled in sports two of them earned professional contracts. He is a massive boxing fan and is known to perform ringwalks for Oisin Fagan and Andy Lee both of whom have appeared in his videos. In 2002 while becoming frustrated at hearing some Irish rappers on radio he called in to Wes D'Arcy's "The Big Smoke" on 2FM to complain and was subsequently invited on the show and he soon became a regular fixture.

He was discovered shortly by Irish producer Mike Donnelly, who would become a longtime collaborator. As a major player in Ireland's underground hip-hop scene, Kelly has a small following in the UK, that includes British rapper Tinchy Stryder and US in 2004, he issued his first mixtape, The Kellection, mixed and helmed by DJ Pudgee P, who is known in New York for his Riot Squad street releases, shortly after that he appeared as an "Unsigned Heat" on DJ Vlad website. However, it was his second mixed tape, Bragging Rights (2006), that established his credibility as an Irish rapper. In 2008 Kelly issued the underground hit single Dropkicked, which featured Boston underground rapper Slaine, and sampled I'm Shipping Up to Boston by the Dropkick Murphys. Officially released as an MP3, the hard jam mainly enjoyed airplay within the MySpace web community, and earned the Irish MC work with more American mixtape DJs, such as DJ Bizerkk and DJ Green Lantern. He has opened up live shows, for rappers such as the Game. Nas, Dilated Peoples, Kelis, Kanye West, Raekwon, d12, Akon, GZA, T-Pain, Mark Ronson & more.

Kelly is known for being one of the only Irish M.C's to achieve success outside Ireland on a reputable level. He has performed his own headline shows in Canada, UK & Boston, was signed to US TV Show 16 bars he has been featured in XXL had his records played on Sirius FM in US and even performed as in studio guest on BBC and KISS in London. He has collaborated with a number of artists from Slaine Reef the Lost Cauze Apathy and Memphis Bleek and most recently Rebecca Creighton (formerly of X-Factor band Belle Amie) on his single The Real Thing. His last 2 singles have been "Big Record of the Week" and "Record of the Weekend" on The Kiss Hip-Hop show and Nick Bright's Show on BBC 1Xtra respectively. He is currently working on projects with j57 from Brown Bag All-Stars Danny Diggs, Mathman and other albums.

In January 2013 DJ Eclipse listed Kelly's song "Georgie Burgess" in The Best 25 songs of 2012.

In March 2013 he dropped a visual for the Scimon Tist produced "Jack The Ripper" through the Noisey Music Blog.

In June 2013 he appeared to announce his retirement. and stated his performance at the Danny Brown show would be his last.

On 20 August 2013 "Kel Terrible" went to number 1 on the Irish iTunes hip-hop charts and number 10 on the iTunes album charts.

In September 2013 he announced via Twitter that his new album Black Irish Rogue would be released on Commonwealth Records, a US based independent label that previously released Slaine albums.

There has been speculation that he will return to rap as the "Jack The Ripper" character after the Black Irish Rogue album.

In April 2014, he guested on Memphis Bleek's "The Movement 2" on a song called "RNS" featuring Sean Price. The song was played by DJ Kay Slay on "The Drama Hour" Show on Hot 97, making him the first Irish rapper to play on Hot 97.

Commonwealth Records soon announced the release date and track for Black Irish Rogue and on July 15 it went #1 on Irish Hip-Hop iTunes chart. The lead single "4 Horsemen" became the 1st Irish hip-hop video to be played on US MTV2 and P Diddy's Revolt TV. The radio single "Jimmy Jump" featuring Da Villinz peaked at #3 on the US College radio charts. Soon afterwards it was announced that he had signed to New York Indie Hip-Hop label Soulspazm for another new album titled "Kel Jefe." "Kel Jefe" was released on June 10 and became his third straight album to reach #1 on the Irish Hip-Hop Tunes Charts as well as peaking at #5 on the overall iTunes chart

In December 2018 Rob released a collaborative album with Rim from NYC Group Da Villinz, predominantly produced by London Producer Tony Mahoney called "Lethal Hours" four of the songs on the album were played by DJ Muggs on Soul Assassins radio.

In Feb 2019, Rob appeared on the posthumous Sean Price album "86 Witness" on the song "Refrigerator P" released through Duckdown records it peaked at #8 on US iTunes Hip-Hop chart. The song was originally recorded when Sean Price was alive and came about after their previous work together. The song was featured as a pick of the week on episode 223 of The Joe Budden Podcast.

== Discography ==
=== Albums ===
- Kel Terrible (2013)
- Kel Perro (2014) EP Free Download
- Black Irish Rogue (2014)
- No Blacks No Dogs No Irish (2015) with S.A.S
- Kel Jefe (2016)
- Lethal Hours (2018) with Rim

=== Mixtapes ===
- The Kellection (2004)
- Bragging Rights (2006)
- St Patrick's Day Massacre (2009)

=== Singles ===
- Dropkicked [feat. Slaine] 2008
- Gameover (featuring Memphis Bleek & Selah) 2012
- The Real Thing (featuring Rebecca Creighton) 2012
