= Love Me No More =

Love Me No More may refer to:

- Love Me No More (film), a 2008 French film
- "Love Me No More" (Jim Jones song), a song from the album Harlem's American Gangster
