= Belle Amie =

English pop group

- Genres: Pop; electropop; hip hop; R&B
- Years active: 2010–14
- Label: Dodient
- Past members: Geneva Lane; Rebecca Creighton; Esther Campbell; Sophia Wardman
- Website: belleamie1.com

Belle Amie were an English pop girl group based in London. They were formed during the seventh series of The X Factor in 2010, where they were the sixth contestant eliminated. The band originally consisted of Esther Campbell, Sophia Wardman, Rebecca Creighton and Geneva Lane who all auditioned to the show as soloists. Their debut single, "Girls Up", was released in August 2011. Lane had left the group in early January 2011 and Creighton left in April 2012 in order to pursue a solo career. The group split up in 2014.

== History ==
=== 2010: Formation and The X Factor ===
Belle Amie consisted of singers Esther Campbell, Sophia Wardman Rebecca Creighton and Geneva Lane. The group was formed after all members applied as soloists for the seventh series of The X Factor in 2010, but each failed to qualify for the Girls category. The judges, after a suggestion by Cowell, put them together in a band, qualifying for the Groups category. Their qualifying song, as well as their first song ever as a group, was an acoustic version of "Faith". They reached the live shows and were mentored by Simon Cowell.

In the first week of live shows, they sang "Airplanes" by B.o.B and were safe. In week 2, they sang "You Really Got Me". As a result of the public vote, they were put in bottom three and had to sing in the final showdown on 17 October, after Storm Lee polled the fewest votes and was eliminated. They sang "Big Girls Don't Cry" and were saved by judges Louis Walsh, Dannii Minogue and Cheryl Cole voted to save them and eliminate Diva Fever instead, without having their mentor Cowell to vote. However, the voting statistics revealed that Diva Fever received more votes than Belle Amie which meant that if the result went to deadlock, Diva Fever would've been saved.

In the third week, they sang "I'll Stand by You", in which they progressed to the fourth week, where they performed "Venus". However, they were in the bottom two for the second time with Katie Waissel, and sang "Breakaway" in the final showdown. The result went to deadlock, and Belle Amie were eliminated. A week later, the group performed at G-A-Y, along with series 5 finalist Diana Vickers.

=== 2011–12: Lane's departure, debut album and Creighton's departure ===
In January 2011, it was reported Geneva Lane had left the group. Lane stated her short time with the band "was absolutely brilliant, but as time went on I realised that it wasn't what I wanted and I missed performing with a live band and songwriting."

Two months after Lane's departure, they released a snippet of their debut single "Girls Up" in March 2011. The band signed a record deal with Dodient Records and their debut single "Girls Up" was released on digital download and CD single on 28 August 2011. The music video premiered in early June 2011 and became 16th most watched video worldwide in two days on YouTube. On 29 June 2011 the group uploaded a Mash-up of songs from 2011 to their official YouTube channel. On 1 July 2011, Perez Hilton blogged about the remix, stating it as "an awesome mash-up of some of the hits of 2011…so far!".

On 11 August 2011, they appeared on The Crush and performed a cover of Tinchy Stryder and Dappy's "Spaceship". On 30 September 2011, they released a snippet of a new song titled, "Shine". On 2 October 2011, Esther and Rebecca revealed that the group plan to release their debut album sometime next year, after they release several new singles. In February 2012 they uploaded their second full song "Stand Up" On 13 April 2012, it was announced that Rebecca had left the group to pursue a solo career leaving original members, Esther and Sophia, with an undetermined future.

== Discography ==
=== Singles ===
Year	Song	Chart positions	Album
Year	Song	UK Indie	Album
2011	"Girls Up"	25	Non-album single

=== Featured singles ===
Year	Song	Chart positions		
Year	Song	UK	IRE	SCO
2010	"Heroes" (as part of The X Factor Finalists)	1	1	1

=== Music videos ===
Title	Year	Director
"Girls Up"	2011	D. O. Fissoun and Mouktar Mohammed

== Members ==
Member	2010	2011	2012	2013	2014
Geneva Lane (2010–2011)					
Rebecca Creighton (2010–2012)					
Esther Campbell (2010–2014)					
Sophia Wardman (2010–2014)					

=== Members ===
- Esther Campbell is from London, where she studied performing arts and musical theatre. For her first audition Campball sung "One Night Only", and was put through to bootcamp by all three judges. After being told she couldn't go through to judges' houses as a solo artist, she was put into Belle Amie.
- Sophia Wardman is from Scarborough, Yorkshire, where she studied music. Wardman received four yeses, and made it to bootcamp, but was eventually put into Belle Amie. Before Belle Amie, Wardman was a contestant on reality TV show Shipwrecked: Battle of the Islands 2007. On 30 January 2013, Wardman uploaded an acoustic session of an original song written by herself on her YouTube page titled, Standing Upside Down.
- Geneva Lane is from Guildford, where she studied musical theatre. Lane previously won 2008 Spanish singing contest The WOW Factor. In the X-factor auditions she received four yeses after singing "At Last", thus making it to bootcamp, but was put into Belle Amie before judges' houses. Geneva agreed to join Belle Amie, being a member of the group all the way through their X Factor journey. In January 2011, Lane left the group. Geneva stated it wasn't the direction she wanted to take musically, and that as a solo artist she has more freedom creatively, and can express herself. After leaving the band, Lane signed a record deal with Hillbilly Records, and her debut single "Karma" was released on 25 September 2011. Lane has recorded a new song, titled "Write It Down", which is due for release sometime in 2012.
- Rebecca Creighton, is from Tallaght, Ireland. She left her job as a hairdresser to pursuit her dreams of being a singer, and auditioned for X Factor. Creighton managed to get through to bootcamp, but was put into Belle Amie, being a member of the group all the way through their X Factor journey and remaining in the group 2 years after they were eliminated from the show. In 2012 Creighton left Belle Amie to concentrate on her own interests in R&B and rap music. She sang on Irish rapper Rob Kelly's single The Real Thing. Belle Amie released a statement in April 2012 saying "We're really sorry to announce that Rebecca has decided to leave the group to pursue a solo career.... We're really upset with the decision made as the future for Belle Amie was looking bright." Creighton expressed her frustration that there was little support for Belle Amie and they had struggled to get airplay for their music.
