= Kim Koscki =

American stuntman (1964–2014)

Kim Robert Koscki (November 23, 1964 – October 9, 2014) was an American stuntman whose career spanned 30 years of film and television.

The Chico, California-born Koscki's credits include The Lost Boys, Hook, The Mighty Ducks, Apollo 13, Star Trek: First Contact, Contact, Sonny with a Chance and True Blood.

Koscki died after an October 5, 2014 non work-related bicycle accident in California. He suffered cardiac arrest, was taken to hospital in a coma, and died on October 9, 2014, aged 49. He was married and had two children.

At the time of his death, Koscki had been stunt and fight coordinator for the science-fiction film Wizardream and Expelled.

The movie, "Expelled" directed by Alex Goyette was produced in memory of Koscki
