= Joy Todd =

Joy Todd (born Feb 1935, died February 18, 2014) was an American casting director.

She worked on several films with director Sidney Lumet, including Network, Prince of the City, The Verdict, Garbo Talks, Family Business, and Q&A. She also worked on several films starring Sylvester Stallone, including Rocky II, Rocky III, Cobra, Rambo III, Lock Up, and Demolition Man.

In addition, Todd was casting director for Paul Mazursky's Moscow on the Hudson (in which she also appeared) and Scenes from a Mall as well as the 1994 American Civil War drama Gettysburg and its 2003 prequel, Gods and Generals. She also did casting work on Ghostbusters, was one of the casting directors on Sergio Leone's acclaimed Once Upon a Time in America and helped cast extras in such films as Kramer vs. Kramer, Sea of Love and Hudson Hawk.

Todd died of natural causes in San Diego, California on February 18, 2014.
