= George L. Little =

American costume designer

George L. Little (March 6, 1951 – August 29, 2014) was an American costume designer. He was best known for his work on Kathryn Bigelow's acclaimed war films, The Hurt Locker and Zero Dark Thirty, the latter of which earned him a nomination from the Costume Designers Guild Awards in the Excellence in Contemporary Film category. He was also nominated for an Emmy Award for his work on the 1988 miniseries Lincoln.

Little got his start as a costumer on Francis Ford Coppola's Apocalypse Now and worked his way up to become a costume supervisor on such popular films as Airplane II: The Sequel, Red Dawn, About Last Night and No Way Out. He collaborated with Oscar-winning costume designer Albert Wolsky on numerous films, first as costume supervisor on Barry Levinson's Bugsy and Toys and Alan J. Pakula's The Pelican Brief and later as assistant costume designer on Striptease, Red Corner, Galaxy Quest, Lucky Numbers and Jarhead.

Little's first film as head costume designer was Tony Scott's 1995 thriller Crimson Tide, which was followed by the 1999 family comedy The Prince and the Surfer, Rodrigo García's 2000 drama Things You Can Tell Just by Looking at Her and the 2001 television movie Uprising. In 2000, director John Moore enlisted Little to be head costume designer on his first feature film, the 2001 release Behind Enemy Lines. Little went on to design the costumes for Moore's next three films: Flight of the Phoenix, The Omen and Max Payne. Other films for which Little was costume designer include The Crazies, Warm Bodies, Transcendence and his final film Fantastic Four.

In 1993, Little married fellow costume supervisor Carlane Passman, with whom he had worked on Bugsy, Toys, The Pelican Brief and Sliver. They continued working together during their marriage, with Passman serving as Little's assistant costume designer on The Prince and the Surfer, Things You Can Tell Just by Looking at Her, Behind Enemy Lines, Flight of the Phoenix and The Omen. Little and Passman divorced in 2014; later that year, on August 29, Little died at his home in Los Angeles at the age of 63. The details of his death were not disclosed.
