= Danny Murphy (American actor) =

American actor (1955–2014)

- Born: August 20, 1955; Boston, Massachusetts, US
- Died: August 8, 2014 (aged 58); Florida, US
- Occupation: Actor
- Years active: 1996–2014

Danny Murphy (August 20, 1955 – August 8, 2014) was an American actor. He was known for his roles in There's Something About Mary and in Me, Myself & Irene. His last movie role was in Hall Pass. Murphy was born in Boston, Massachusetts.

Murphy was a quadriplegic as the result of a diving accident that took place at Martha's Vineyard on August 8, 1974. His friend and director, Peter Farrelly, was with him at the accident.

Murphy criticized Farrelly for not including disabled people in his movie Dumb & Dumber. This led to Murphy's first movie role in Farrelly's comedy movie Kingpin.

Murphy died in Florida from cancer, aged 58, on August 8, 2014, exactly 40 years after his catastrophic accident.
