= Anthony Goldschmidt =

Anthony Goldschmidt (September 15, 1942 – June 17, 2014) was an American graphic, title and poster designer, as well as founder of the Intralink Film Graphic Design firm.

== Biography ==
Born in New York City, Goldschmidt attended private schools in Massachusetts and Switzerland before receiving a bachelor's of fine arts degree from the Sam Fox School of Design & Visual Arts at Washington University in St. Louis, as well as a master of fine arts from Yale School of Art.

Goldschmidt joined the Warner Bros. marketing department working on posters for the Mel Brooks comedies Blazing Saddles and Young Frankenstein, working alongside longtime collaborator John Alvin.

Goldschmidt founded his firm Intralink in the 1980s, and spearheaded the poster campaigns for major motion pictures, their biggest accomplishment was 1982's E.T. the Extra-Terrestrial, creating the iconic image of the alien and Elliot touching fingers. Goldschmidt and Alvin made this poster without the prior knowledge of what the design of the alien would look like.

Over the course of his 40-year career, Goldschmidt would frequently design film posters for several directors including Steven Spielberg, Christopher Nolan, Ridley Scott, Frank Darabont and Ron Howard. Apart from his poster career, Goldschmidt was credited with designing the titles of numerous pictures, including Batman Forever and Thelma & Louise

Goldschmidt closed his firm in 2011, his last project being the official poster for the 84th Academy Awards. He died of liver cancer on June 17, 2014, age 71.

== Selected filmography ==
=== Film ===
- Blazing Saddles (1974)
- Young Frankenstein (1974)
- Blade Runner (1982)
- E.T. the Extra-Terrestrial (1982)
- Cocoon (1985)
- The Color Purple (1985)
- Empire of the Sun (1987)
- The Lost Boys (1987)
- Rain Man (1988)
- Thelma & Louise (1991)
- A Few Good Men (1992)
- Chaplin (1992)
- The Crow (1994)
- The Shawshank Redemption (1994)
- Apollo 13 (1995)
- Twister (1996)
- Psycho (1998)
- The Green Mile (1999)
- The Perfect Storm (2000)
- A.I. Artificial Intelligence (2001)
- The Aviator (2004)
- Batman Begins (2005)
- Cinderella Man (2005)
- The Da Vinci Code (2006)
- The Dark Knight (2008)
- Angels & Demons (2009)

=== Television ===
- It's Always Sunny in Philadelphia
- Sex and the City
- The Shield
- The Sopranos
