= Mardan (film) =

2014 film

- Directed by: Batin Ghobadi
- Written by: Batin Ghobadi
- Starring: Helan Abdulla
- Release date: 6 September 2014 (TIFF)
- Running time: 110 minutes
- Country: Iraq
- Language: Kurdish

Mardan is a 2014 Iraqi drama film written and directed by Batin Ghobadi. It was selected as the Iraqi entry for the Best Foreign Language Film at the 87th Academy Awards, but was not nominated.

== Cast ==
- Helan Abdulla as Leila
- Mehdi Bayramlou as Shemal
- Feyyaz Duman as Morad
- Hossein Hasan as Mardan
- Beritan Yeldistan as Rozhan
- Ismail Zagros as Karzan

== See also ==
- List of submissions to the 87th Academy Awards for Best Foreign Language Film
- List of Iraqi submissions for the Academy Award for Best Foreign Language Film
