= Helly Luv =

Kurdish musical artist

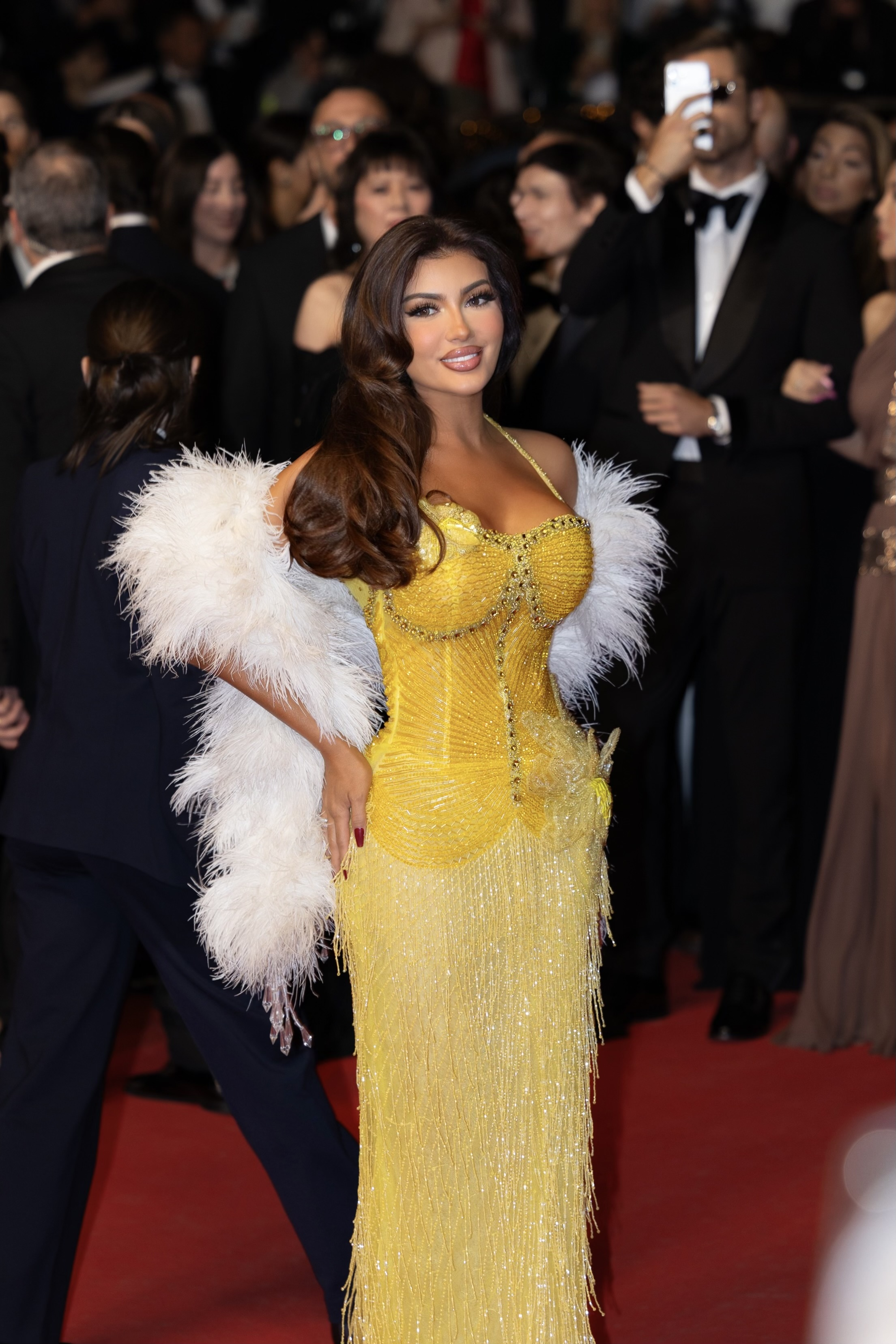
- Helly Luv in 2014
- Born: Helen Abdulla; 16 November 1988 (age 38); Urmia, West Azerbaijan, Iran
- Citizenship: Finnish
- Occupations: Recording artist; actress
- Years active: 2009–present
- Musical career
- Genres: R&B; Pop; World; Dance
- Instrument: Vocals
- Label: G2 Music Group
- Website: www.hellyluv.com

Helen Abdulla (Kurdish: هێلین عەبدوڵڵا; born 16 November 1988), better known by her stage name Helly Luv (ھێڵی لەڤ), is a Kurdish singer, dancer, choreographer, actress, model, She rose to fame after uploading cover videos on social media websites like Myspace and YouTube. Helly Luv has since starred in movies, music videos and has released her own material. Gaining popularity from her 2013 single "Risk It All", Helly Luv has recently signed to G2 Music Group. In 2014, she appeared in her first theatrical feature film, Mardan.

== Personal life ==
Helly Luv was born to an Iraqi Kurdish family during the Persian Gulf War in the city of Urmia, Iran, on November 16, 1988. Her family escaped the city of Dohuk in Iraqi Kurdistan by fleeing to Iran, where she was born, and suddenly to Turkey for safety. Eventually Helly Luv and her family's application was approved to become citizens of Finland, allowing her and her family to be one of the first Kurdish immigrants to live there. She took an interest in singing in a neighborhood choir and then expanded her interest by playing the piano, and taking drama classes. She began performing in school demonstrating her singing and dancing abilities. Dancing became her primary focus and afforded her an opportunity to compete in European dance championships and soon signed a contract with Finland's Nike Women.

== Career ==
In 2006, Helly Luv moved to Los Angeles, California, United States on her own to pursue her dream. Just before she started making arrangements to return to Finland, Helly Luv received a Myspace message from Grammy winning record producer Los Da Mystro to sign an artist deal with his production company. During this deal she had the opportunity to work with Grammy award-winning singer-songwriter The-Dream. In winter 2013, Helly Luv signed a music deal with Gawain "G2" Bracy II and G2 Music Group. G2 Music Group released "Risk It All," the lively and inspirational leadoff single from Helly Luv's debut album. Produced almost entirely by Gawain "G2" Bracy II, the song synthesized Latin and Middle Eastern rhythms with world-pop songwriting. "Risk It All" received attention almost immediately in Finland, peaking all the way to the top three iTunes singles the first week and competing with Rihanna's "Diamonds" single.

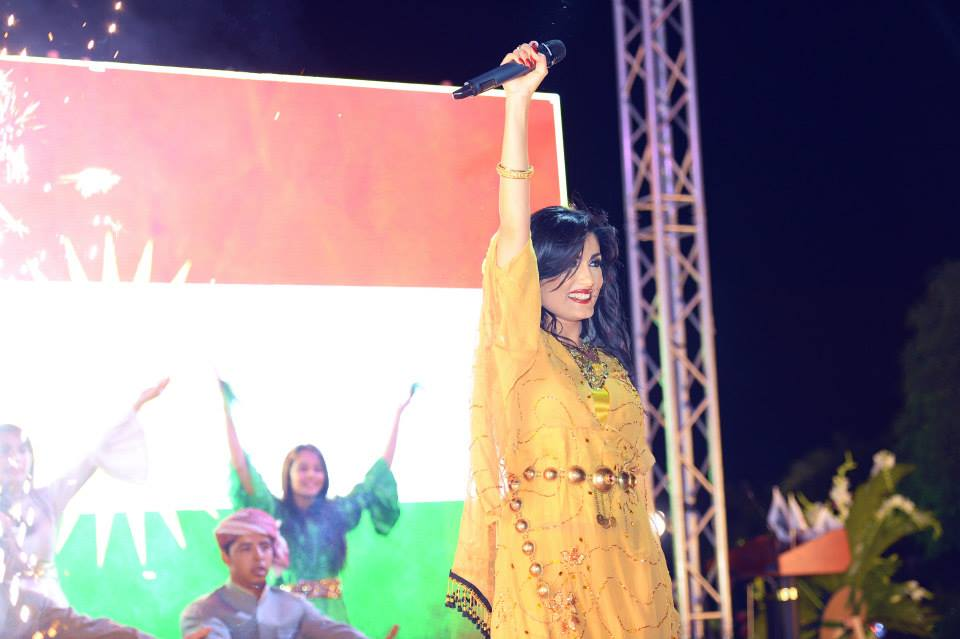
Helly Luv performing at Queen Elizabeth II birthday celebration in 2014

In 2014, Helly Luv starred in the international film Mardan directed by Batin Ghobadi and Bahman Ghobadi where she played the leading role of Leila. Later that year she attended the Toronto International Film Festival becoming the first Kurdish actress to attend the event.

In 2015, Helly Luv shot the video for her single "Revolution" in an abandoned village near Mosul, where the Kurdish forces were fighting the ISIL. In the video of the single, she is seen painting the word "Revolution" on a tank shell in red lipstick and then Attack on the ISIL front lines just a few kilometers away.

== Other ventures ==
=== Philanthropy ===
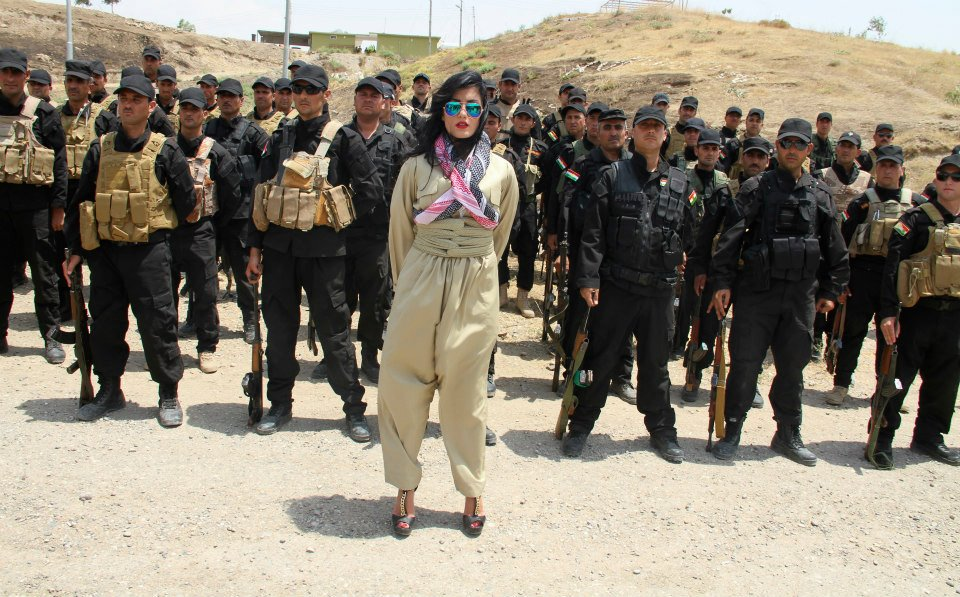
Kurdish pop star Helly Luv poses in front of Kurdish Peshmerga troops at a base in Dohuk on July 5, 2014

In 2014, she created her Luv House non-profit organization to help the people and animals in need throughout Kurdistan. On January 22, 2014, Helly Luv, A.R.K (Animal Rights Kurdistan), W.I.N.E (Women's International Network Erbil), Dr. Sulaiman Tameer, KOARP (Kurdistan Organization for Animal Rights Protection), Miss Kurdistan Fenik, and the owner of the Zoo helped close the doors to the Gelkand Park in Kurdistan (the second worst zoo in the world). Helly Luv and the other organizations moved the animals to a new and improved zoo in Erbil, the capital of the Kurdistan region.

On July 6, 2014, Helly Luv visited the peshmerga headquarters in the city of Duhok, Iraq near the border of Mosul, Iraq during the defense against ISIL; with a mission to deliver food and water to the peshmerga troops.

== Singles ==
- "Risk It All" (2013)
- "Revolution" (2015)
- "Bad Kitty (Down on the Floor)" (2012)
- "GUNS & ROSES" (2018) with Ardian Bujupi
- ”Boy-bye” (2019)
- "Min Tu Navey" (2020)
- "Mshtaglk" (2021) as featured artist
- ”Kurdish Barbie” (2022)
- ”Go Go Ale Ale (World Cup Song)” (2022)
- ”Yalla Habibi ” (2023)

== Filmography ==
- Mardan (2014)
- Flag Without A Country (2015)
