= Rapota =

Island of Aitutaki

Coordinates: 18.9286°S 159.7579°W

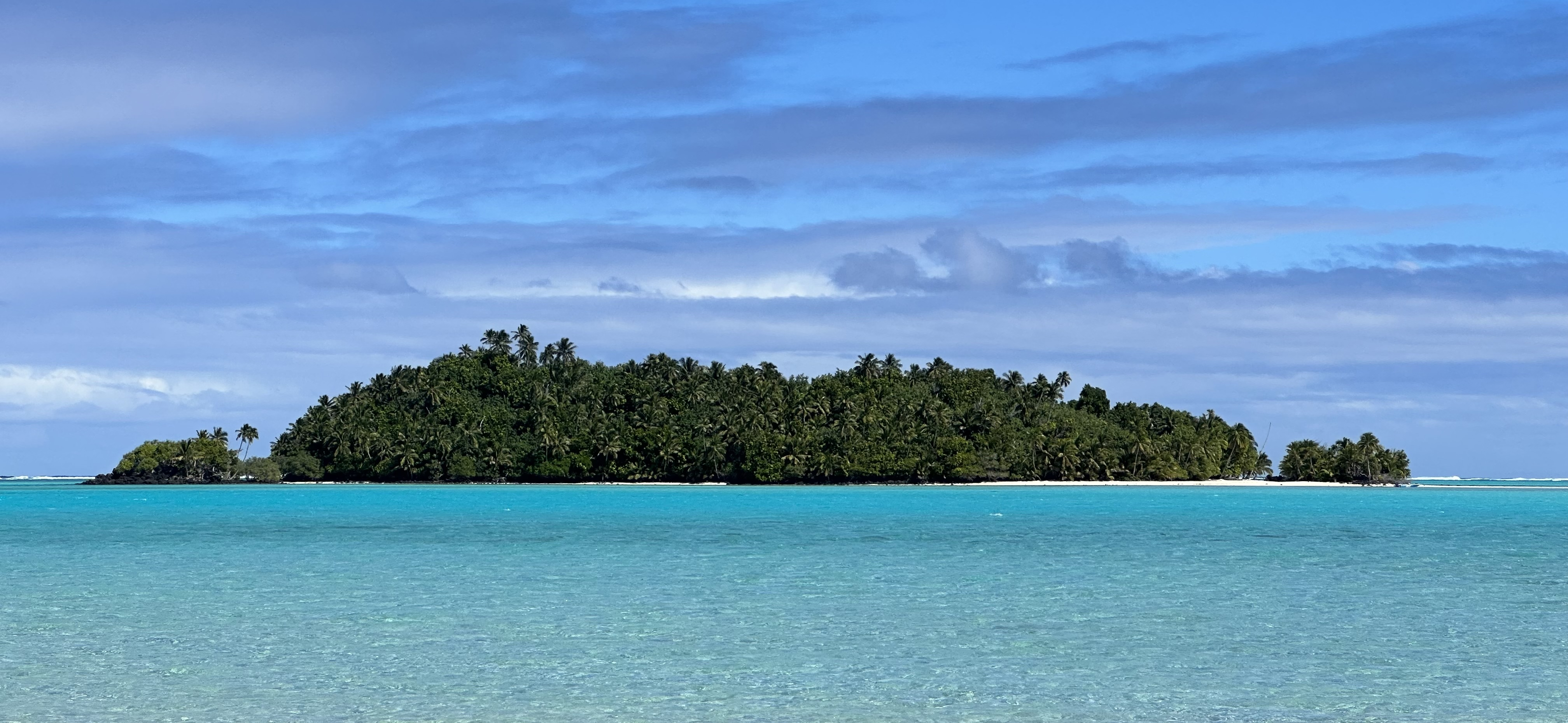
The island in 2023

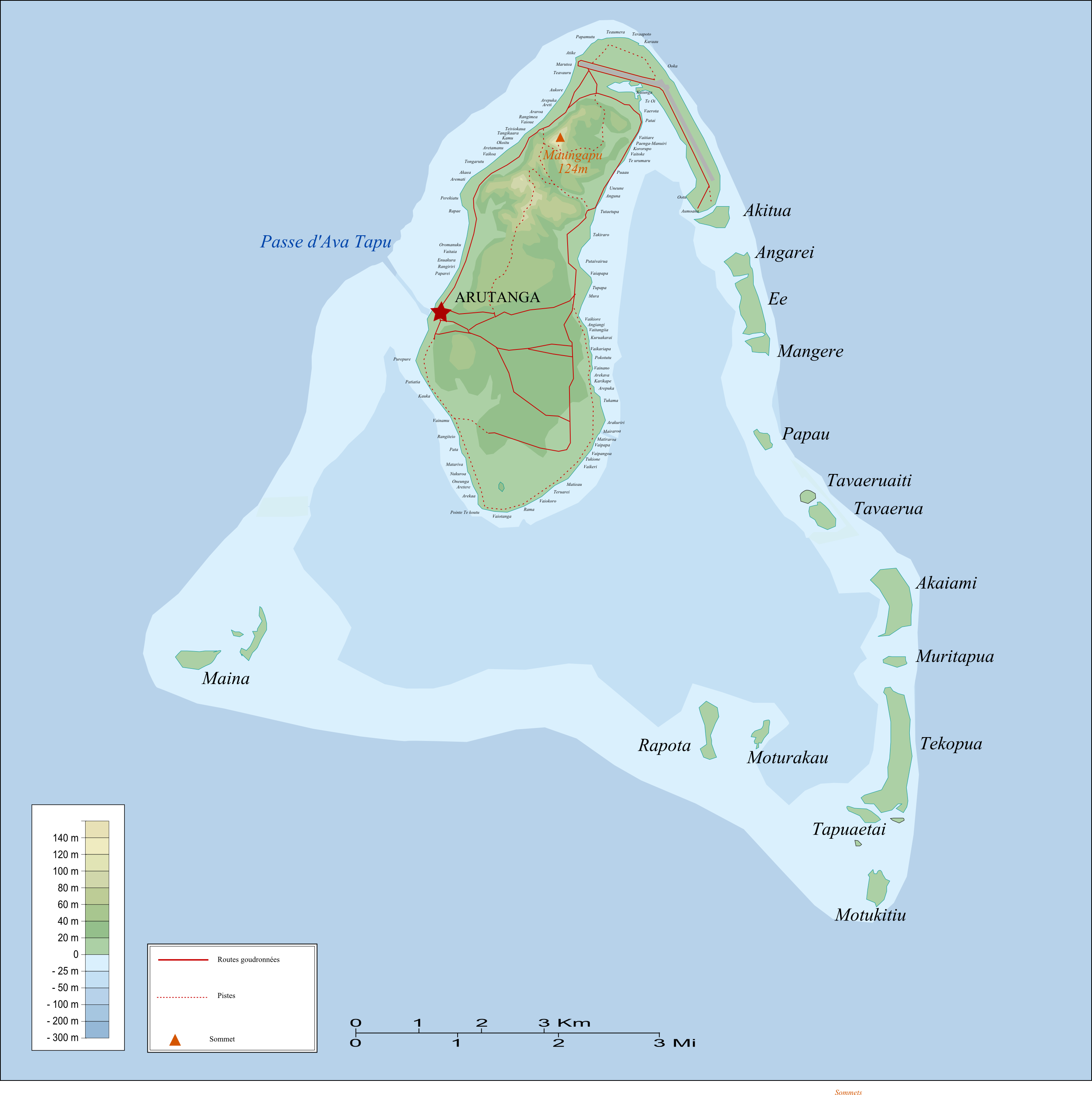
Topographic map of Aitutaki

Rapota is one of 22 islands in the Aitutaki atoll of the Cook Islands. It is located in the south of Aitutaki Lagoon to the west of the smaller island of Moturakau, six kilometres (3.7 mi) to the southeast of the main island of Aitutaki. The island is volcanic, with a core of basalt surrounded by basalt boulders.

Rapota was home to the 'Tigers' for four years of the UK reality TV programme Shipwrecked: Battle of the Islands.
