= Moturakau =

Coordinates: 18.9254°S 159.7499°W

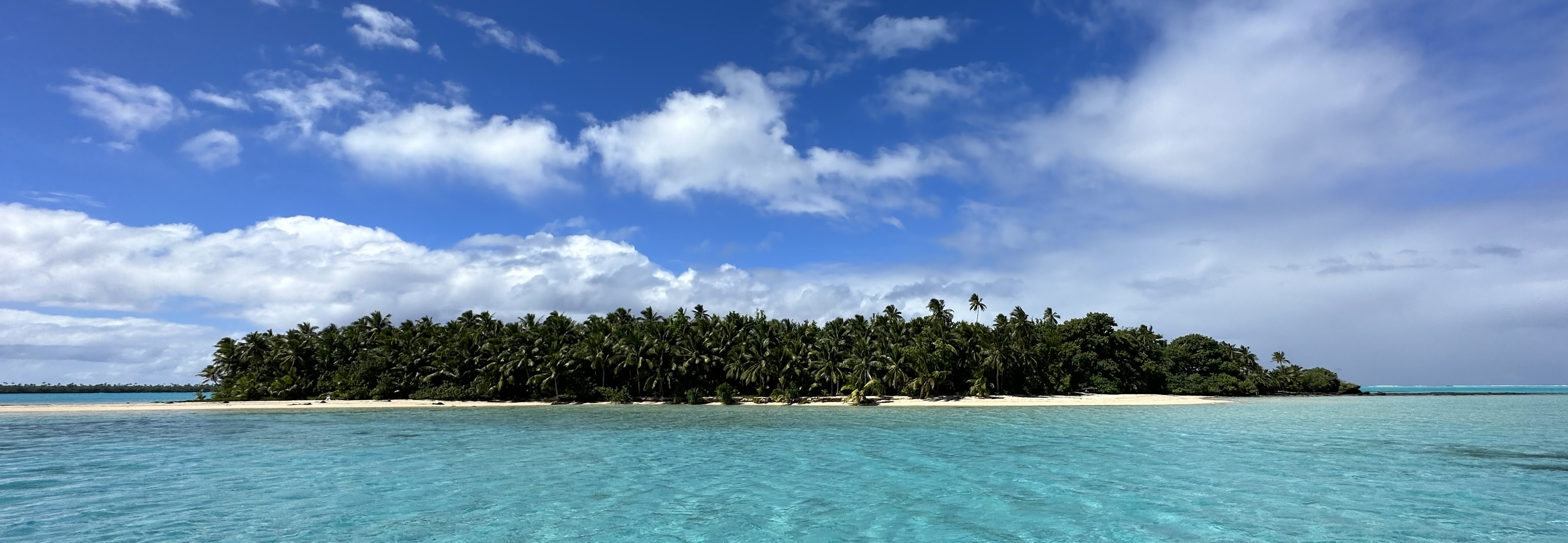
The island in 2023

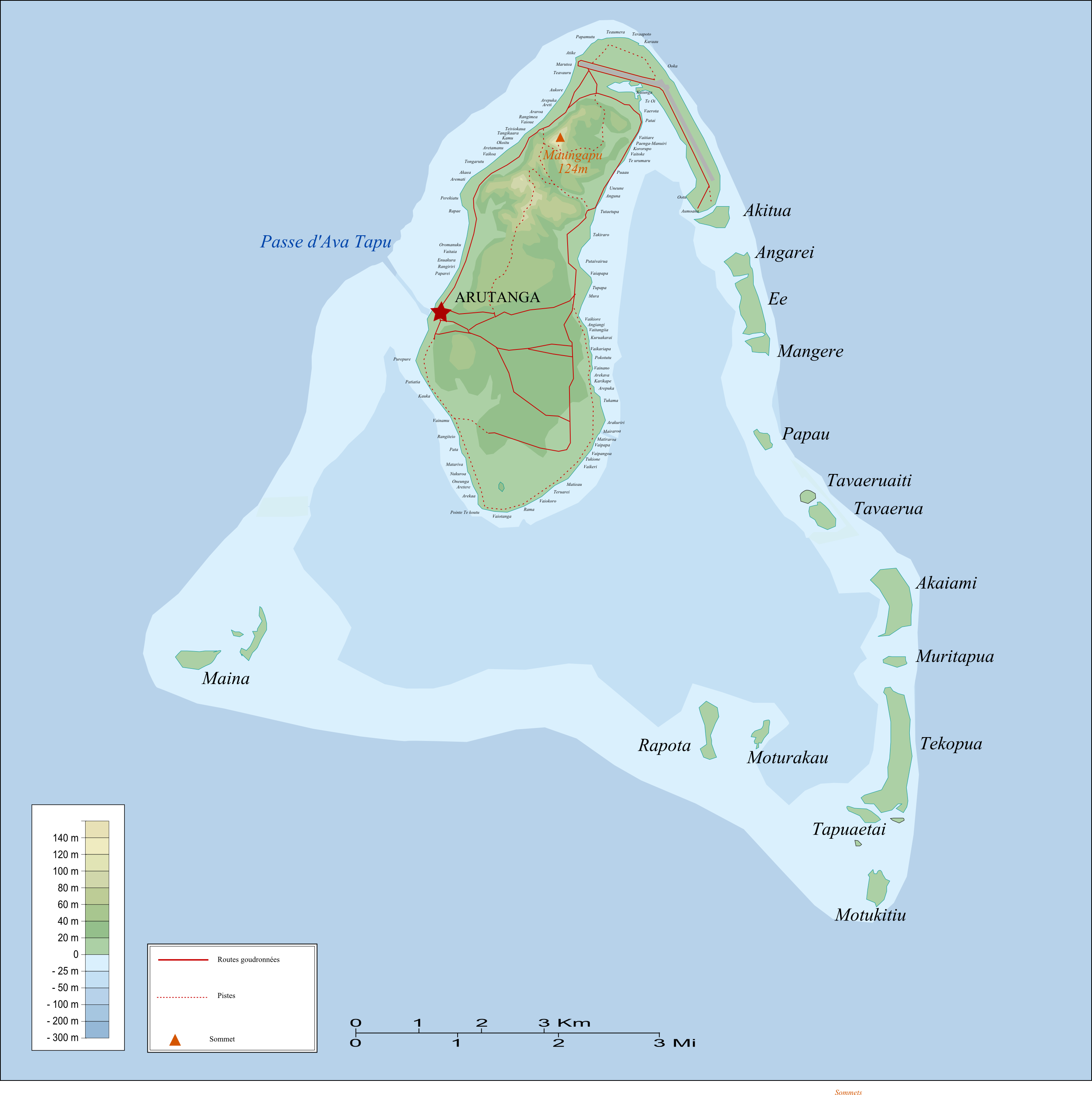
Topographic map of Aitutaki

Moturakau is one of 15 islands in the Aitutaki atoll of the Cook Islands. It is located in the southeast of Aitutaki Lagoon between the larger islands of Rapota and Tekopua, six kilometres (3.7 mi) to the southeast of the main island of Aitutaki. The island is 460 metres (1,510 ft) long and 120 metres (390 ft) wide.

Moturakau served as a leper colony from the 1930s to 1967. More recently, it was home to the 'Sharks' for four years of the UK reality TV programme Shipwrecked: Battle of the Islands and was also used for Survivor: Cook Islands, the 13th season of the American version of Survivor.
