= Shipwrecked (TV series) =

British reality tv show

- The Island logo (2011–2012)
- Also known as: Shipwrecked International (series 3, 2001); Shipwrecked: Battle of the Islands (2006–2009, 2019); Shipwrecked: The Island (2011–2012)
- Genre: Reality television
- Directed by: Tania Alexander Dee Koppang (2006–2009)
- Narrated by: Andrew Lincoln (2000–2001); Craig Kelly (2006–2009, 2011–2012); Vick Hope (2019)
- Country of origin: United Kingdom
- Original language: English
- No. of series: 8
- No. of episodes: 127

Production
- Production locations: Moturakau (series 1) and Rapota, Cook Islands (Battle of the Islands); Tonga (series 2); Fiji (series 3)
- Running time: 30–90 minutes
- Production companies: RDF Television; Fizz and Motion Content Group (2019)

Original release
- Network: Channel 4
- Release: 12 January 2000 – 19 December 2001
- Release: 8 January 2006 – 10 May 2009
- Network: E4
- Release: 23 October 2011 – 31 January 2012
- Release: 28 January – 15 February 2019

Related
- Castaway 2000; Survivor

Shipwrecked is a British reality television programme that aired on Channel 4's now defunct youth programming brand, T4 between 2000 and 2012. The original version ran for three series from 12 January 2000 to 19 December 2001 and was constructed as a social experiment, without a competitive format or prize.

The programme returned for four series from 8 January 2006 to 10 May 2009 in a new format, as Shipwrecked: Battle of the Islands. It featured two teams competing with each other for new members, with the larger team winning a cash prize at the end.

The series transferred to E4, beginning on 23 October 2011, retitled Shipwrecked: The Island.

On 22 May 2018 Channel 4 confirmed that the series would return on E4, in 2019, with fierce competition between two battling islands, the tigers and the sharks with filming taking place in the summer on two Motu in the lagoon at Aitutaki in the Cook Islands. The new series used the Battle of the Islands format and began airing on 28 January 2019, narrated by Vick Hope. The series ended on 15 February and on 15 July 2019, it was announced that the revived show had been axed due to low ratings.

In 2013, a Russian version of the show aired on NTV.

== Original series ==
=== Series 1 (2000) ===
The first series ran for 9 episodes from 12 January to 1 March 2000. In the series, a group of young British contestants were stranded in the Cook Islands. The format saw 16 18- to 24-year-olds stranded on Moturakau for 68 days and 67 nights, when they were eventually picked up by a sailing boat.

The 16 contestants were Elliot Dell, Dan Woodrow, Jack Krelle, Jessica Pearson, William, Rachel, Megane Quashie, Mandy Dassa, Star Hart, Lisa Norton, David, Jen, Ashna, Simon Babbage (Crusoe), Darrell (Paddy), Will Chapman, and Andy.

By the end there were only seven contestants left on the island; the others had departed to have fun on the mainland of Aitutaki and Jess left in week 5 to sail round the South Pacific. Unlike the recent series which have had game show formats, the original series (and to an extent series 2 and 3) relied on trial and error which gave it a very raw format. A pig was slaughtered in week 4, chickens were killed, and fish, snails, clams and octopus were caught by hand in the open sea. There were expeditions to the reef to fish, night fishing and in week 3–4 the island was flash-flooded by high tides. Also in approximately week 3-4 the cast began weekly canoe trips in pairs to the mainland to collect "supplies" (vegetables and fruit).

The series was narrated by actor Andrew Lincoln.

=== Series 2 (Early 2001) ===
The second series ran for 13 episodes from 18 January to 28 February 2001, and the contestants were this time sent to Tonga. Before going to the island, a panel of judges ran the applicants through a boot camp-style audition process before selecting the final participants. A notable incident occurred when some contestants stole food from the producers tent on the other side of the island, and a group of girls left the main tribe to form their own camp.

=== Series 3 (Late 2001) ===
The third series ran for 16 episodes from 5 November to 19 December 2001, and the contestants were sent this time to Fiji. One of the contestants who was unknown at the time but later became famous in other reality series was Jeff Brazier and Chloe Everton who is now a Sky Sports News presenter. Sarah-Jane Crawford is now a BBC Radio 1Xtra DJ and TV Presenter for MTV.

In this version, the cast was more international, with several of the contestants coming from Australia and the United States. As with the first two series, it was designed purely as a "social experiment" and was also referred to as Shipwrecked International.

The show was the third and final series to be narrated by actor Andrew Lincoln. An official paperback book about the series, written by author David Spedding, was published in October 2001 by Channel 4.

== Battle of the Islands ==
Shipwrecked: Battle of the Islands logo (2006–2009)

=== Series 1 (2006) ===
The fourth series ran from 8 January to 14 May 2006 as Shipwrecked: Battle of the Islands 2006. The new series, with all four series from 2006 to 2009 executive producer Tania Alexander directed by Dee Koppang, share little in common with the original version of Shipwrecked, but more in common with Survivor (the British version of which was made by ITV). While the earlier series were more of a The Real World-style documentary without prizes or competition, this fourth series divided the competitors into two islands, who would compete for a prize of £70,000.

The programme featured two teams, the "Sharks" and the "Tigers", who live on the previously uninhabited Pacific islands of Moturakau and Rapota respectively (both are part of Aitutaki in the Cook Islands). The show was narrated by actor and voice-over artist, Craig Kelly.

A new contestant arrives every week and spends half the week with one team and half the week with the other before deciding which team he or she would like to stay with. The team with the most members at the end of the show's five-month run share the prize money.

Contestants are free to leave at any time and can also nominate themselves to change teams at the weekly beach party (generally the only time during the week when the Sharks and Tigers meet). If the other team votes to accept them they can then swap islands, if not they have to stay with their original team.

If two or more people put themselves forward for nomination from one island, then the rival island are only permitted to accept one nominee per week. Each island must have a minimum of 5 people at all times - nominations are only allowed if an island has six or more people. Contestants are only allowed two island moves during the series.

During the final week, the islands were equal with 14 inhabitants each, leaving the final new arrival Jenni Danns the hard decision of choosing which island would win. She eventually chose Shark Island, and the Sharks won the £70,000 prize. The show's editors highlighted attempts by the Tigers to persuade a Shark named Jo (whose brother had earlier quit the Shark tribe) to nominate herself to switch at the death (despite their refusal to accept her brother when he had attempted to switch). She decided to stay on Shark Island after saying although she was tempted, she 'could never leave my [her] sharkies'.

=== Series 2 (2007) ===
The fifth series ran from 21 January to 10 June 2007 as Shipwrecked: Battle of the Islands 2007. There were the same groups, Tigers and Sharks, as last year as well as the same islands. This time the islands were initially split with all the males on Shark island and the females on Tiger island. The prize money still remains as £70,000, which the Tigers in turn won. A day before the first episode, T4 aired the show Shipwrecked: Meet the Islanders, which showed viewers the islanders' audition tapes.

On 3 June, the Tigers were declared winners (16–15 against the Sharks).

The "Shipwrecker Of The Year" was decided in the T4 studio reunion on 10 June. The finalists for the boys were: Ben Lunt, Paul Harris and James Green, and the finalists for the girls were: Lianne Dauban, Jane Barrie and Lucy Buchanan. Ben Lunt was the winner, also winning £15,000.

Tigers took the crown of Shipwrecked Champions 2007 after no nominations from either tribe.

The original Tiger girls were Fiona Merry, Lianne Dauban and Lucy Buchanan (other Tiger originals were Sophia Wardman and Terri Jones, who later joined the Sharks). They were later joined by Amy Blackburn (who later joined the Sharks), Ben "Macben" Cochrane, Ben "Scouse Ben" Lunt, James Green, Allen Brandie (who left the show after 2 weeks), Louis Rennocks, Gary Sullivan (who was won as a pontoon prize by the Sharks, but later joined the Tigers), Ben "Chez" Chesney, Francesca Willi, Andy Faulkner, Fliss Jaine, Jamie Goldthorpe and Lucy Carr.

The original Sharks were Stevie Thomas, Joe Stone, Jack Krelle, Will Colin (and Lorenzo Preecha who left the series). They were joined by Paul "Marine" Harris, Jo Davis, Naomi Millbank-Smith, Amy Blackburn, Terri Jones (defected Tiger), Sophia Wardman (defected Tiger), Elisa McNally, Ella Bowman, Andrew Sanders, Kim Davidson and Jonno Burden.

The final vote was cast by previous year's originals, Charlie Freeman and John Melvin, who chose the Tigers as the winners.

The show was narrated by actor and voice-over artist, Craig Kelly.

=== Series 3 (2008) ===
The sixth series ran from 12 April to 27 July 2008 as Shipwrecked: Battle of the Islands 2008. This year the islanders had various twists on their first week, also including a third island. Unlike the previous two series, series 3 had prize money of £100,000, £30,000 more than the 2007 series. This series is credited with launching the career of actress Lara Goodison.

This time the Tigers and Sharks received two new arrivals each week. They had to pick one to stay on their island and one they thought was sent home. In reality this rejected new arrival was sent to a secret third island a.k.a. Hawk Island.

In the second to last week, the tribes received three new arrivals instead of the usual two. As usual, only one got to stay, while the other two went to join the Hawks.

The Hawks came back to the original two islands in the final week, with the girls spending their first two days back on Shark Island, and the boys on Tiger Island. They then swapped over for the following two days. At the final beach party each of the final new arrivals (the former Hawk Islanders) individually picked between joining the Tigers and the Sharks. In the final week the Sharks were leading with 13, while the Tigers had only 9, however at the final beach party 12 of the 13 new arrivals picked Tiger Island, leaving Tigers with an amazing 21, compared to the Sharks' 14 (there were no nominations from either tribe). Original Shark James, and original Tiger Char (both rejected to the third ("Hawk") Island in the first week (14 weeks previously)), both picked Tiger Island, and were finally awarded their island necklaces. Original Hawk Islander, and survival expert Nick, also joined Tiger Island.

The series was won by the Tigers (21 to 14).

The series was the third to be narrated by actor and voice-over artist Craig Kelly.

=== Series 4 (2009) ===
The seventh series ran from 1 February to 10 May 2009 as Shipwrecked: Battle of the Islands 2009. The format changed significantly however to that of past series, in that instead of one tribe winning the £70,000 prize, one person would win the entire sum. There was a 'back to basics' theme to the series. Every week two new arrivals spent several days with each island (Shark Island and Tiger Island). During their stay they were appointed 'tribal leaders' and invented island rules. At the end of the week a 'beach party' was hosted where the new arrivals must choose to make either a joint or separate decision on which island they wish to stay on for the remainder of the competition. The Sharks won overall and the money went to Greg.

The series was the fourth to be narrated by actor and voice-over artist Craig Kelly.

=== Series 5 (2019) ===
On 22 May 2018 Channel 4 confirmed that the series would return on E4, with filming taking place in summer 2018, on two Motu in the lagoon at Aitutaki. Airing from 28 January 2019, this series used the Battle of the Islands format. The prize money for this series was £50,000. The series, the ninth overall, was the first to be narrated by Vick Hope, and in a change to previous seasons, episodes aired each weekday for three weeks on E4.

The Tigers won the season, sharing the £50,000 prize.

== The Island (2011–2012) ==
On 19 May 2011, Channel 4 confirmed the show's return in 2011 with a 15-episode run and a back-to-basics theme instead of Battle of the Islands.

A special look-back show was aired on Channel 4 on 23 October 2011. Shipwrecked: The Island was launched on 25 October 2011 on E4. Airing at 8pm every Tuesday until 31 January 2012, there was no episode broadcast on 20 December 2011.

The series was the fifth and final to be narrated by actor and voice-over artist Craig Kelly, as the T4 brand was axed in December 2012.
